= 2024 Rhode Island FC season =

Rhode Island FC
2024 season
- Head coach: Khano Smith
- Stadium: Beirne Stadium, Smithfield, RI
- USL Championship: Eastern Conference: 5th place
- U.S. Open Cup: Third Round
- USL Playoffs: Eastern Conference Champions
- Top goalscorer: League: Albert Dikwa (10); All: Albert Dikwa and JJ Williams (11)
- Highest home attendance: 5,252 (4 times)
- Lowest home attendance: 3,481 (June 26)
- Average home league attendance: 4,306
- Biggest win: RI 8–1 MIA (October 26)
- Biggest defeat: TB 4–1 RI (March 30)
Home colors	Away colors
- All statistics correct as of 18:00, November 23, 2024 (UTC).

The 2024 Rhode Island FC season was the first ever season for Rhode Island FC. The club debuted in the USL Championship, the second tier of professional soccer in the United States. The team finished in fifth place in the Eastern Conference regular season, and were Eastern Conference playoff champions.

== Preseason ==
RIFC announced their first player signing on November 1, 2023, and continued to add players to the team over the course of the winter. By mid-January, the team had announced 15 players under contract, and brought players and coaches together for training camp starting on January 15, 2024.

Training camp was held in outdoors in Smithfield, Rhode Island, and indoors at a facility in North Smithfield, Rhode Island. The team worked out in Rhode Island before continuing on to a two-week session at IMG Academy in Bradenton, Florida, including closed-door friendlies against MLS and MLS reserve clubs. A 6-day training session in Bermuda, capped by two exhibition matches against a Bermuda select team, was held in late February. A free friendly against Providence College's men's soccer team rounded out the team's preseason.

High-profile signings including Koke Vegas, JJ Williams, and reigning USL most valuable player and golden boot winner Albert Dikwa, led to high expectations for an expansion team. The team entered the season with projections of making the USL playoffs, and being a contender for a home playoff game at the end of the season.

== Regular season ==
=== March ===
The team played its inaugural regular season game against New Mexico United on March 16, 2024, at Beirne Stadium. The game was announced as a complete sellout with attendance of 5,252 people. After falling behind in the second half, RIFC scored an equalizer in stoppage time to finish with a 1-1 draw. The goal was initially credited to Mark Doyle, but was determined to be an own goal scored by New Mexico's Chris Gloster.

After the inaugural home game, RIFC had a two-game road trip to Monterey Bay FC and the Tampa Bay Rowdies. In their initial away game, Albert Dikwa scored the first goal by an RIFC player, following up with a second goal later in the game. Despite Dikwa's brace, the team tied Monterey Bay 2-2. In their game at Tampa, the team took a 1-0 first-half lead, but lost 4-1.

=== April ===
RIFC opened April with a pair of scoreless draws, home against Charleston and Pittsburgh. Goalie Jackson Lee, playing in place of injured Koke Vegas, recorded the first two clean sheets of his career, and was named to the USL Championship Team of the Week for each game.

After not scoring or conceding in consecutive games, RIFC scored and gave up four goals in its U.S. Open Cup debut on April 16 at USL League One side Charlotte Independence. In the Third Round cup game, RIFC was tied 3-3 at the end of regulation, and 4-4 after extra time. During the ensuing penalty shootout, RIFC had a chance to win 4-3 in penalties, but ended up losing 5-4 in seven rounds of shots, with Charlotte advancing over RIFC to the Fourth Round. The eight-goal game was the highest-scoring to that point of the tournament.

Once back in league play, RIFC played at Las Vegas on April 20. Goals by Stephen Turnbull and Noah Fuson were enough to secure the first victory in team history. Turnbull and coach Khano Smith were named to the USL Championship Team of the Week for the goal and for the team's first win.

Playing at home against defending champions Phoenix Rising FC, RIFC closed the month with a 3-1 loss.

=== May ===
The team opened May with a goalless draw on the road at North Carolina. Koke Vegas returned from injury absence and recorded his first clean sheet for the team.

On May 10, RIFC announced that New England Revolution midfielder Jack Panayotou was sent on loan to the team. Panayotou played the following day in their game against unbeaten Western Conference first-place Sacramento Republic FC, providing an assist on the team's go-ahead goal. A late Sacramento goal resulted in a 2-2 tie.

On May 23, The Boston Globe reported that team president Brett Luy was leaving the team to take a special advisory position with Fortuitous Partners, the corporation that is developing the team's Tidewater Landing stadium.

The team's final game in May was against second-place Louisville City FC. The goalless draw at home was the first time in the 2024 season that a clean sheet was recorded against the Louisville team.

David Peart, a former cable and sports executive, was named team president on May 31. In subsequent interviews, Peart indicated that his top priority for the team was to help raise RIFC's profile and prepare for the opening of the team's new stadium in 2025.

=== June ===
The team began the month of June with their first rivalry game away against Hartford Athletic. The as-yet-unnamed derby featured the two closest teams geographically in the USL, and drew a sellout crowd in Hartford. RIFC scored on a fourth-minute Mark Doyle goal, and held on for a 1-1 tie in the derby.

Upon return to Rhode Island, the team lost to Detroit City FC 2-0, but then started a streak of unbeaten games. In their away game against Memphis 901 FC they took an early 2-0 lead, and held on for a 2-2 tie after an 87th-minute Koke Vegas red card.

In international play away from the team, Jojea Kwizera played for the Rwandan National Team, and Isaac Angking played for Puerto Rico. Kwizera’s goal in international play was the first by an RIFC team member, and was the only goal in a 1-0 Rwandan victory.

RIFC traveled to Kentucky on June 22, and recorded a 5-2 victory over Louisville City FC, setting a team record for goals, in what was reported as one of the most unexpected USL wins of the year. Louisville had been previously undefeated at home. RIFC’s 5 goals were the most ever given up by Louisville in a home match. Khano Smith was named USL Coach of the Week, and Jojea Kwizera named to the Team of the Week after the victory.

Four days later, RIFC recorded their first home win, in a 3-0 victory over El Paso Locomotive. The victory came in their eighth home game, after 5 ties and two losses. Jackson Lee’s third clean sheet brought them up to 9th place at the end of the month, one space out of the playoffs.

=== July ===
RIFC opened July with a home game against Indy Eleven. The team came back from a 2-0 deficit with two goals from Frank Nodarse, then a late Isaac Angking comeback goal secured a 3-3 tie. At the end of the game, the team was in 8th place in the standings, the first time they’d been in a playoff position since late April.

The team had a two-game roadtrip to Miami FC and Birmingham Legion, with 3-2 and 3-1 respective victories. Albert Dikwa scored a brace in the Miami game. In Birmingham, Noah Fuson scored in the first minute, and a brace from newly-signed Zachary Herivaux provided the rest of the offense. At the completion of the Birmingham game, the team was on a five-game streak of scoring 3 or more goals.

Upon returning home at the end of July, RIFC beat North Carolina FC 2-1, coming back from another deficit to win.

Over the entire month of July, the team’s three wins and a tie were enough to earn coach Khano Smith the USL Coach of the Month award. The team ended the month on a 7-game undefeated streak.

=== August ===
Rhode Island FC’s August 3 game against Detroit City FC was one of three 2024 USL games nationally televised on CBS. RIFC fell behind in the second half, but came back to tie on a stoppage-time goal by Clay Holstad.

The team followed up the Detroit game with a mid-week 1-0 loss to Indy Eleven in Indianapolis. The team made six changes to their lineup from the previous game, and ended their 8-match undefeated stretch.

On August 10, RIFC hosted Hartford Athletic in their second derby game. The rivalry game, which was described by fans as “El Clamico,” was won by Rhode Island by a 3-0 score.

RIFC’s next matches against the Oakland Roots and Loudon United were 1-1 and 0-0 draws, respectively. Koke Vegas saved a second-half stoppage time penalty shot to preserve the scoreless tie. A 2-0 home win against Birmingham Legion FC closed the month, with RIFC sitting in fifth place in the Eastern Conference.

=== September ===
RIFC opened September with a two-game roadtrip to Pittsburgh Riverhounds SC and Orange County FC. After only losing one game since June, the team failed to score in either game, losing 2-0 and 1-0 away. In the Pittsburgh game, RIFC managed only three shots. The Orange County loss created the first losing streak in team history, and put the team on the cusp of falling out of the playoff race.

Returning to Beirne Stadium, the team won 2-1 over FC Tulsa, scoring another second-half stoppage-time goal to secure the victory.

RIFC closed September with a 3-1 win away at San Antonio FC. Albert Dikwa’s goal 18 seconds into the game set the team record for earliest goal in a game.

=== October ===
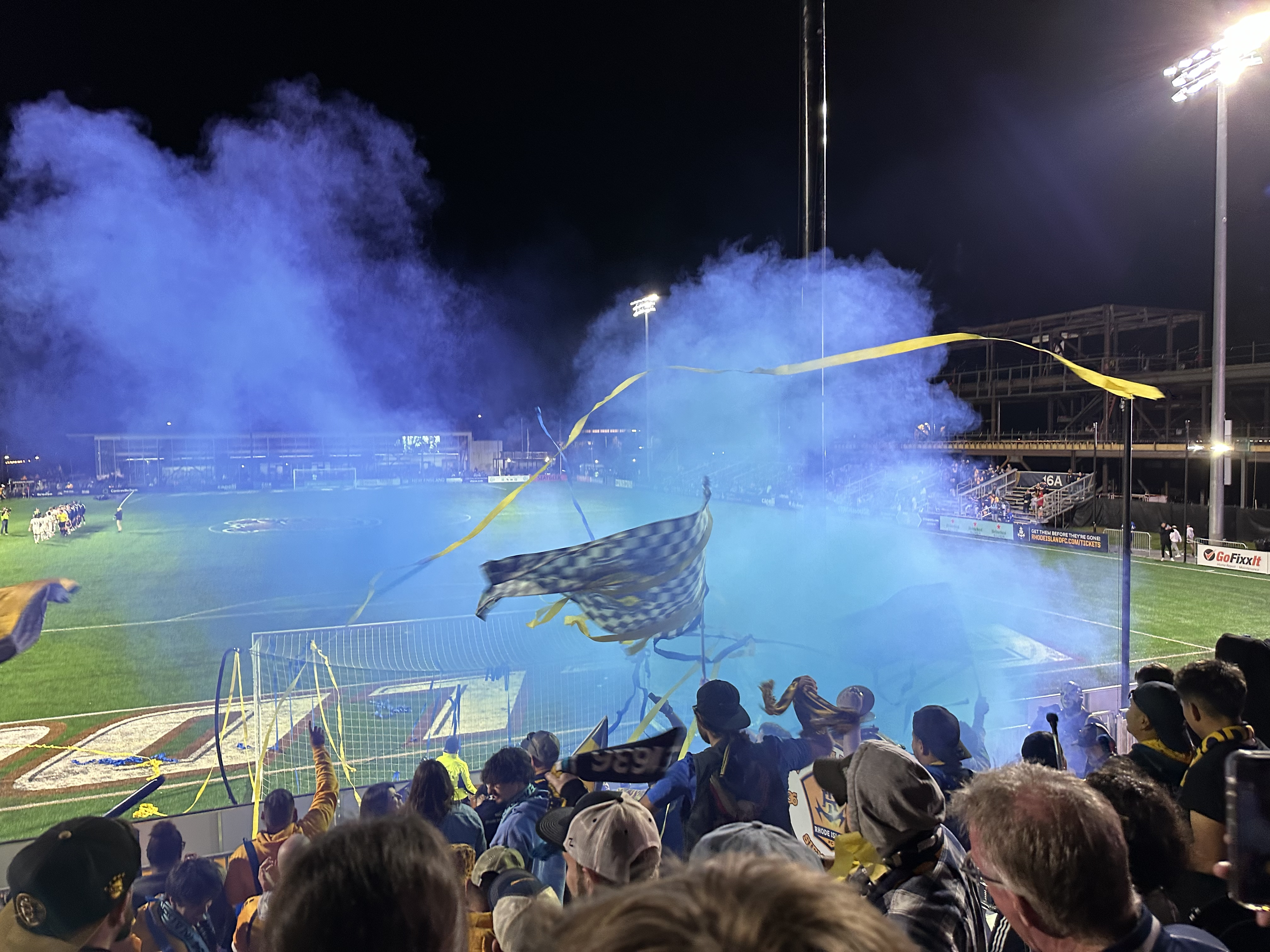
Fans cheer before the kickoff of the October 5th, 2024 match vs Tampa Bay

RIFC team entered October looking to clinch a home playoff game. In their first game of the month against the Tampa Bay Rowdies at home, they notched a 3-1 victory, with goals from three different players.

Their home game against Loudoun United was their second goalless draw against the team; Loudoun was the only team against which RIFC neither scored nor allowed a goal.

RIFC then traveled to Charleston Battery for their final road game of the regular season. Though they took a 1-0 lead, they ended in a 1-1 tie against Charleston. The draw was RIFC’s 15th of the season, setting the USL Championship single-season record.

Rhode Island closed the season against the last-place Miami FC. They routed the team, scoring an 8-1 victory. JJ Williams scored a hat trick, and five other players contributed one goal each. Noah Fuson had his league-leading 10th assist. The eight goals and 7-goal margin of victory were team records, and the highest across the entire USL Championship in 2024.

== Postseason ==
By finishing fifth in the USL Eastern Conference, RIFC qualified for the USL playoffs. They were the first true expansion team in 5 years to make the playoffs, and missed the opportunity for a first-round home playoff game only by losing the head-to-head points tiebreaker with Indy Eleven.

Their first-round away playoff game against Indy Eleven was held on Sunday, November 4. JJ Williams netted a hat trick in his second consecutive game as RIFC advanced with a 3-2 victory.

RIFC traveled to Louisville, Kentucky for their Eastern Conference semi-final game, against Louisville City FC. RIFC was the only team to defeat Louisville at their home stadium during the regular season, and did it again in the playoffs, with a 3-0 win. JJ Williams again scored multiple goals, and Albert Dikwa scored late to seal the victory.

RIFC defeated Charleston Battery 2-1 in the Eastern Conference Championship game on November 17.The team scored two goals, and hung on for a 2-1 win.

Rhode Island played in the USL Championship Game on November 23 against the Colorado Springs Switchbacks. RIFC lost 3-0, and finished the season as Eastern Conference Champions.

== Player movement ==
=== In ===
No.	Pos.	Player	Transferred from	Fee/notes	Date	Source
1	GK	(Spain) Koke Vegas	(United States) San Diego Loyal	Free transfer	November 1, 2023	
28	MF	(United States) Conor McGlynn	(United States) Hartford Athletic	Free transfer	November 8, 2023	
5	DF	(United States) Grant Stoneman	(United States) San Diego Loyal	Free transfer	November 8, 2023	
77	MF	(United States) Amos Shapiro-Thompson	(United States) New York Red Bulls II	Free transfer	November 9, 2023	
14	FW	(Republic of Ireland) Mark Doyle	(Republic of Ireland) St Patrick's Athletic	Free transfer	November 21, 2023	
7	MF	(Liberia) Prince Saydee	(United States) Hartford Athletic	Free transfer	December 1, 2023	
9	FW	(United States) JJ Williams	(United States) Tampa Bay Rowdies	Undisclosed fee	December 4, 2023	
18	MF	(United States) Joe Brito	(United States) Union Omaha	Free transfer	December 7, 2023	
16	DF	(Brazil) Gabriel Alves	(United States) Birmingham Legion	Free transfer	December 11, 2023	
23	MF	(United States) Marc Ybarra	(United States) Pittsburgh Riverhounds	Free transfer	December 14, 2023	
15	DF	(Cuba) Frank Nodarse	(United States) Rio Grande Valley FC Toros	Free transfer	December 21, 2023	
22	GK	(Australia) Jackson Lee	(United States) West Virginia Mountaineers	Free transfer	December 22, 2023	
3	DF	(United States) Stephen Turnbull	(United States) New York City FC	Free transfer	December 29, 2023	
17	MF	(Rwanda) Jojea Kwizera	(Canada) CF Montreal	Free transfer	January 4, 2024	
12	DF	(United States) Clay Holstad	(United States) Columbus Crew 2	Free transfer	January 12, 2024	
11	FW	(United States) Noah Fuson	(United States) Columbus Crew 2	Free transfer	January 16, 2024	
10	FW	(Cameroon) Albert Dikwa	(United States) Pittsburgh Riverhounds	Free transfer	January 19, 2024	
24	DF	(Canada) Karifa Yao	(United States) Vancouver Whitecaps	Free transfer	January 23, 2024	
21	MF	(Ghana) Kofi Twumasi	(United States) Atlanta United 2	Free transfer	January 24, 2024	
30	GK	(United States) Nate Silveira	(United States) Crown Legacy FC	Free transfer	February 20, 2024	
19	MF	(United States) Kevin Vang	(United States) Providence Friars	Free transfer	February 20, 2024	
2	DF	(England) Nathan Messer	(United States) Providence Friars	Free transfer	March 13, 2024	
4	DF	(United States) Collin Smith	(United States) New England Revolution II	Free transfer	March 29, 2024	
25	MF	(Colombia) Kevin Orduy	(United States) Rio Grande Valley FC Toros	Free transfer	April 25, 2024	
80	MF	(Puerto Rico) Isaac Angking	(United States) Columbus Crew 2	Free transfer	April 30, 2024	
8	MF	(United States) Jack Panayotou	(United States) New England Revolution	Loan	May 10, 2024	
20	MF	(Haiti) Zachary Herivaux	(United States) Tampa Bay Rowdies	Undisclosed fee	July 3, 2024	
6	DF	(Germany) Morris Duggan	(United States) Minnesota United FC	Loan	August 9, 2024	
8	MF	(United States) Jack Panayotou	(United States) New England Revolution	Loan	August 30, 2024	

=== Out ===
Date	Pos.	Player	Transaction	Details	New Club	Ref.
June 4, 2024	MF	(United States) Jack Panayotou	Recall of loan		(United States) New England Revolution	
June 27, 2024	MF	(Liberia) Prince Saydee	Transfer	Undisclosed Fee	(United States) Charleston Battery	
	MF	(Colombia) Kevin Orduy	Released	Date not specified	(United States) Laredo Heat	
December 1, 2024	MF	(Ghana) Kofi Twumasi	Released	Option Declined	(United States) El Paso Locomotive	
December 1, 2024	DF	(Germany) Morris Duggan	Recall of loan		(United States) Minnesota United FC	
December 1, 2024	MF	(United States) Jack Panayotou	Recall of loan		(United States) New England Revolution	
December 1, 2024	MF	(England) Nathan Messer	Released	Option Declined	(United States) Portland Hearts of Pine	
December 1, 2024	FW	(Republic of Ireland) Mark Doyle	Released	Option Declined	(United States) One Knoxville SC	
December 1, 2024	DF	(Brazil) Gabriel Alves	Released	Option Declined	(United States) South Georgia Tormenta FC	
December 1, 2024	MF	(United States) Conor McGlynn	Released	Option Declined	(United States) Westchester SC	
December 1, 2024	DF	(United States) Collin Smith	Released	End of Contract	(United States) Phoenix Rising FC	
December 1, 2024	GK	(United States) Nate Silveira	Released	End of Contract	Retired	

Though their options were not renewed by RIFC at the December 1 deadline, contracts for Kevin Vang, Amos Shapiro-Thompson, and Isaac Angking were subsequently picked up for the 2025 season.

== Roster ==
As of August 30, 2024

Note: Flags indicate national team as defined under FIFA eligibility rules; some limited exceptions apply. Players may hold more than one non-FIFA nationality.

No.	Pos.	Nation	Player
1	GK	ESP	Koke Vegas
2	DF	ENG	Nathan Messer
3	DF	USA	Stephen Turnbull
4	DF	USA	Collin Smith
5	DF	USA	Grant Stoneman
6	DF	GER	Morris Duggan (on loan from Minnesota United FC)
8	MF	USA	Jack Panayotou (on loan from New England Revolution)
9	FW	USA	JJ Williams
10	FW	CMR	Albert Dikwa
11	FW	USA	Noah Fuson
12	DF	USA	Clay Holstad
14	FW	IRL	Mark Doyle
15	DF	CUB	Frank Nodarse
16	DF	BRA	Gabriel Alves

No.	Pos.	Nation	Player
17	MF	RWA	Jojea Kwizera
18	MF	USA	Joe Brito
19	MF	USA	Kevin Vang
20	MF	HAI	Zachary Herivaux
21	MF	GHA	Kofi Twumasi
22	GK	AUS	Jackson Lee
23	MF	USA	Marc Ybarra
24	DF	CAN	Karifa Yao
25	MF	COL	Kevin Orduy (USL Academy contract)
28	MF	USA	Conor McGlynn
30	GK	USA	Nate Silveira
77	MF	USA	Amos Shapiro-Thompson
80	MF	PUR	Isaac Angking

== Competitions ==
=== Preseason friendlies ===
On November 20, 2023, Rhode Island FC announced that the Bermuda Football Association would host the team for a week of training from February 23 to 28, 2024. The partnership was spurred by Khano Smith, Rhode Island's manager and a former Bermuda national football team player.

February 7	Orlando City SC	3–1	Rhode Island FC	Kissimmee, Florida
	Lynn 43', 50'; Unknown 87' (o.g.)	Report	Unknown 84'	Stadium: Osceola County Stadium
Note: Closed-door scrimmage

February 13	Rhode Island FC	1–0	New England Revolution II	Bradenton, Florida
	Kwizera 36'	Report		Stadium: IMG Academy
Note: Closed-door scrimmage

February 25	Bermuda Select	0–8	(United States) Rhode Island FC	Hamilton, Bermuda
6:00PM		Report	Fuson; Kwizera; Brito; Saydee; Ybarra	Stadium: Dame Flora Duffy South Field Stadium

February 27	Bermuda Select	1–5	(United States) Rhode Island FC	Hamilton, Bermuda
8:00PM	Hall	Report	Dikwa; Angking (trialist); Fuson; Saydee	Stadium: Dame Flora Duffy South Field Stadium

March 8	Rhode Island FC	2–0	Providence Friars	Smithfield, RI
7:30PM	Fuson 45'; Vang 84'	Report		Stadium: Beirne Stadium

=== USL Championship ===
==== Eastern Conference ====
Pos	Team	Pld	W	L	T	GF	GA	GD	Pts	Qualification
1	Louisville City FC (S)	34	24	6	4	86	43	+43	76	Playoffs
2	Charleston Battery	34	18	6	10	68	35	+33	64	Playoffs
3	Detroit City FC	34	15	8	11	46	32	+14	56	Playoffs
4	Indy Eleven	34	14	11	9	49	50	−1	51	Playoffs
5	Rhode Island FC	34	12	7	15	56	41	+15	51	Playoffs
6	Tampa Bay Rowdies	34	14	12	8	55	46	+9	50	Playoffs
7	Pittsburgh Riverhounds SC	34	12	10	12	41	28	+13	48	Playoffs
8	North Carolina FC	34	13	12	9	54	43	+11	48	Playoffs
9	Birmingham Legion FC	34	13	15	6	44	51	−7	45	
10	Hartford Athletic	34	12	14	8	39	52	−13	44	
11	Loudoun United FC	34	11	14	9	44	39	+5	42	
12	Miami FC	34	3	29	2	26	89	−63	11	

Source: USL Championship Standings
Rules for classification: 1) head-to-head points; 2) head-to-head goal differential; 3) points-per game within conference; 4) total wins; 5) total goal differential; 6) total goals scored; 7) points earned against top four Conference finishers; 8) disciplinary points; 9) coin toss or drawing of lots
(S) Players' Shield winner

==== Results summary ====
Overall								Home						Away					
Pld	W	D	L	GF	GA	GD	Pts	W	D	L	GF	GA	GD	W	D	L	GF	GA	GD
34	12	15	7	56	41	+15	51	7	8	2	31	16	+15	5	7	5	25	25	0

Last updated: October 26, 2024.
Source: Match reports

Round	1	2	3	4	5	6	7	8	9	10	11	12	13	14	15	16	17	18	19	20	21	22	23	24	25	26	27	28	29	30	31	32	33	34
Stadium	H	A	A	H	H	A	H	A	H	A	H	A	H	A	A	H	H	A	A	H	A	A	H	H	A	H	A	A	H	A	H	H	A	H
Result	D	D	L	D	D	W	L	D	D	L	D	D	L	D	W	W	D	W	W	W	D	L	W	D	D	W	L	L	W	W	W	D	D	W
Eastern Conference	10	11	11	11	11	8	8	10	9	10	11	11	11	11	11	9	8	9	8	7	8	8	6	8	7	5	6	8	6	6	5	5	5	5

Updated to match(es) played on October 26, 2024. Source: Match reports
A = Away; H = Home; W = Win; D = Draw; L = Loss

==== Regular season ====
All times in Eastern Time Zone.

March 16 1	Rhode Island FC	1–1	New Mexico United	Smithfield, RI
4:00PM	Fuson (yellow card) 39'; Ybarra (yellow card) 45+1'; Stoneman (yellow card) 52'; Holstad (yellow card) 66'; Gloster 90+2' (o.g.)	Report	Gloster (yellow card) 61'; Maples 68' (yellow card) 89'; Micaletto (yellow card) 77'	Stadium: Beirne Stadium; Attendance: 5,252; Referee: Jeremy Scheer

March 24 2	Monterey Bay FC	2–2	Rhode Island FC	Seaside, CA
6:00PM	Archimède (yellow card) 13'; Guzmán 45'; Trager 72'; Gallaway (yellow card) 90+4'; Martinez (yellow card) 90+8'	Report	Brito (yellow card) 37'; Dikwa 41', 63'; Stoneman (yellow card) 46'; Ybarra (yellow card) 54'; Turnbull (yellow card) 55'	Stadium: Cardinale Stadium; Attendance: 3,359; Referee: Alexis Da Silva

March 30 3	Tampa Bay Rowdies	4–1	Rhode Island FC	St. Petersburg, FL
7:30PM	Hilton (yellow card) 1'; Guillén (yellow card) 53'; Arteaga 54'; Jennings 61' (yellow card) 67'; Doherty 72'; Munjoma (yellow card) 75'; Ortiz (yellow card) 90+3'; Rivera 90+6'	Report	Dikwa 16' (yellow card) 46'; McGlynn (yellow card) 45+3'	Stadium: Al Lang Stadium; Attendance: 6,001; Referee: Elvis Osmanovic

April 6 4	Rhode Island FC	0–0	Charleston Battery	Smithfield, RI
7:30PM	Holstad (yellow card) 4'; Dikwa (yellow card) 22'; McGlynn (yellow card) 28' (yellow-red card) 70'; Nodarse (yellow card) 31'; Twumasi (yellow card) 90+7'	Report	Ycaza (yellow card) 34'	Stadium: Beirne Stadium; Attendance: 3,729; Referee: Joshua Encarnación

April 13 5	Rhode Island FC	0–0	Pittsburgh Riverhounds SC	Smithfield, RI
7:30PM	Holstad (yellow card) 50'; C. Smith (yellow card) 90+8'	Report	Osumanu (yellow card) 62'; Blackstock (yellow card) 68'; Biasi (yellow card) 88'; Diene (yellow card) 90+2'; Johnson (yellow card) 90+4'	Stadium: Beirne Stadium; Attendance: 3,678; Referee: Olvin Oliva

April 20 6	Las Vegas Lights	1–2	Rhode Island FC	Las Vegas, NV
8:00PM	Alba (yellow card) 28'; Nigro (yellow card) 45+2'; Noël 54'; Hafferty (yellow card) 74'	Report	Turnbull 25'; Lee (yellow card) 30'; Fuson 45'; Doyle (yellow card) 90+1'	Stadium: Cashman Field; Attendance: 1,943; Referee: Benjamin Meyer

April 26 7	Rhode Island FC	1–3	Phoenix Rising FC	Smithfield, RI
7:30PM	Yao (yellow card) 35'; Holstad (yellow card) 43' (goal) 89'; Fuson (yellow card) 68'	Report	Cabral 7', 34'; Traore (yellow card) 12'; Fuenmayor (yellow card) 23'; Stenberg (yellow card) 80'; Formella (yellow card) 88'; Varela 90'	Stadium: Beirne Stadium; Attendance: 4,000; Referee: Sergii Demianchuk

May 4 8	North Carolina FC	0–0	Rhode Island FC	Cary, NC
7:00PM	Perez (yellow card) 50'	Report	Holstad (yellow card) 32'; Nodarse (yellow card) 40'; Twumasi (yellow card) 90+3'	Stadium: WakeMed Soccer Park; Attendance: 3,187; Referee: Jeremy Flores

May 11 9	Rhode Island FC	2–2	Sacramento Republic FC	Smithfield, RI
7:30PM	Turnbull 31' (yellow card) 67'; Yao 42' (yellow card) 76'; Alves (yellow card) 61'	Report	Amann 38'; Ricketts 90+3'; Herrera (yellow card) 90+5'	Stadium: Beirne Stadium; Attendance: 3,974; Referee: Alejo Calume

May 17 10	Colorado Springs Switchbacks	3–1	Rhode Island FC	Colorado Springs, CO
9:00PM	Damus 27', 87' (pen.); Yao 65' (o.g.)	Report	Nodarse 13'; Turnbull (yellow card) 34'; Ybarra (yellow card) 45'; Kwizera (yellow card) 60'; Saydee (yellow card) 85'	Stadium: Weidner Field; Attendance: 8,023; Referee: Greg Dopka

May 25 11	Rhode Island FC	0–0	Louisville City FC	Smithfield, RI
4:00PM	Alves (yellow card) 24'; Dikwa (yellow card) 55'; Smith (yellow card) 57'; Yao (yellow card) 61'	Report	Serrano (yellow card) 45+3'; Totsch (yellow card) 53'; Wynder (yellow card) 90+4'	Stadium: Beirne Stadium; Attendance: 4,914; Referee: Jeremy Scheer

June 1 12	Hartford Athletic	1–1	Rhode Island FC	Hartford, CT
7:00PM	Farrell 24'	Report	Doyle 4' (yellow card) 86'	Stadium: Trinity Health Stadium; Attendance: 5,500; Referee: Luis Arroyo

June 8 13	Rhode Island FC	0–2	Detroit City FC	Smithfield, RI
7:30PM		Report	Rodriguez 36'; Carroll (yellow card) 61'; Bezerra 64'	Stadium: Beirne Stadium; Attendance: 4,108; Referee: Elton García

June 12 14	Memphis 901 FC	2–2	Rhode Island FC	Memphis, TN
8:00PM	Lapa (yellow card) 44'; Careaga (yellow card) 75' (goal) 90'; Ward (yellow card) 90+2'; Marlon 90+11' (pen.)	Report	McGlynn 18' (red card) 90+15'; Doyle (yellow card) 32'; Brito 67'; Alves (yellow card) 75'; Vegas (red card) 87'; Holstad (yellow card) 90+5'	Stadium: AutoZone Park; Attendance: 2,188; Referee: Matthew Corrigan

June 22 15	Louisville City FC	2–5	Rhode Island FC	Louisville, KY
8:00PM	Dia (yellow card) 3'; Serrano (yellow card) 56'; Mares 85'; Morris 90+5'	Report	Holstad 30'; Kwizera 45+2'; Dikwa (yellow card) 56'; Williams 67'; Lee (yellow card) 84'; Fuson 90+1'; Yao (yellow card) 90+4'; Angking 90+6'	Stadium: Lynn Family Stadium; Attendance: 9,197; Referee: Kyle Johnston

June 26 16	Rhode Island FC	3–0	El Paso Locomotive	Smithfield, RI
7:30PM	Dikwa 21'; Kwizera 27'; Twumasi (yellow card) 51'; Nodarse (yellow card) 70'; McGlynn (yellow card) 85'; Fuson 90+1'	Report	Calvillo (yellow card) 30' (yellow-red card) 87'	Stadium: Beirne Stadium; Attendance: 3,481; Referee: Nabil Bensalah

July 5 17	Rhode Island FC	3–3	Indy Eleven	Smithfield, RI
7:30PM	Nodarse (yellow card) 19' (goal) 52', 69'; Williams (yellow card) 80'; Kwizera (yellow card) 84'; Angking 90+5'	Report	Wootton 20'; Collier 28'; Mines (yellow card) 35'; Sulte (yellow card) 52'; O'Brien (yellow card) 59'; Gibson 79'	Stadium: Beirne Stadium; Attendance: 4,728; Referee: Ricardo Montero

July 13 18	Miami FC	2–3	Rhode Island FC	Miami, FL
7:00PM	Palacios (yellow card) 9'; López 62'; Molina 78'	Report	Nodarse (yellow card) 5' (goal) 11'; Williams (yellow card) 44'; Dikwa 45+5', 48'; Holstad (yellow card) 50'; Vegas (yellow card) 80'; Fuson (yellow card) 81'	Stadium: Riccardo Silva Stadium; Attendance: 1,238; Referee: Luis Arroyo

July 17 19	Birmingham Legion FC	1–3	Rhode Island FC	Birmingham, AL
8:00PM	Crognale (yellow card) 31'; Kasim 50'; Paterson (yellow card) 78'	Report	Fuson 1'; Dikwa (yellow card) 7'; Ybarra (yellow card) 13'; Herivaux 68', 77'	Stadium: Protective Stadium; Attendance: 4,136; Referee: Benjamin Meyer

July 27 20	Rhode Island FC	2–1	North Carolina FC	Smithfield, RI
7:30PM	Nodarse (yellow card) 15'; Kwizera (yellow card) 65'; Doyle 74'; Herivaux 84' (yellow card) 90+1'	Report	Maldonado 30'; Brewer (yellow card) 72'; Craig (yellow card) 89'	Stadium: Beirne Stadium; Attendance: 4,045; Referee: Eric Tattersall

August 3 21	Detroit City FC	1–1	Rhode Island FC	Hamtramck, MI
4:00PM	Morris 77'	Report	Wiliams (yellow card) 46'; Herivaux (yellow card) 57'; Kwizera (yellow card) 72'; Holstad 90+3'	Stadium: Keyworth Stadium; Attendance: 6,862; Referee: Lorenzo Hernandez

August 7 22	Indy Eleven	1–0	Rhode Island FC	Indianapolis, IN
7:00PM	Guenzatti 34' (yellow card) 50'; Martínez (yellow card) 37'; Diz (yellow card) 90+5'	Report	Stoneman (yellow card) 44'	Stadium: Carroll Stadium; Attendance: 8,091; Referee: Ricardo Fierro

August 10 23	Rhode Island FC	3–0	Hartford Athletic	Smithfield, RI
7:30PM	Holstad (yellow card) 22'; Stoneman 29'; Nodarse 49'; Fuson (yellow card) 52'; Yao (yellow card) 76'; Brito 90+1'	Report	Farrell (yellow card) 66'; Samadia (yellow card) 69'; Boudadi (yellow card) 77'	Stadium: Beirne Stadium; Attendance: 5,252; Referee: Joshua Encarnación

August 17 24	Rhode Island FC	1–1	Oakland Roots	Smithfield, RI
7:30PM	Dikwa (yellow card) 57' (goal) 87'; Nodarse (yellow card) 57'; Kwizera (yellow card) 89'	Report	Riley (yellow card) 22'; Hackshaw 33' (red card) 72'; Diaz (yellow card) 90+6'	Stadium: Beirne Stadium; Attendance: 3,662; Referee: Brandon Stevis

August 24 25	Loudoun United FC	0–0	Rhode Island FC	Leesburg, VA
7:30PM	Ryan (yellow card) 34'; Turner (yellow card) 87'	Report	Kwizera (yellow card) 57'; Stoneman (yellow card) 80'; Williams (yellow card) 90+9'	Stadium: Segra Field; Attendance: 4,017; Referee: Thomas Snyder

August 31 26	Rhode Island FC	2–0	Birmingham Legion FC	Smithfield, RI
7:30PM	Duggan (yellow card) 19'; Turnbull 71' (yellow card) 72'; Kwizera (yellow card) 89'; Williams 90'; Brito (yellow card) 90+3'	Report	Crognale (yellow card) 30'; Paterson (yellow card) 90+3'	Stadium: Beirne Stadium; Attendance: 3,713; Referee: Greg Dopka

September 7 27	Pittsburgh Riverhounds SC	2–0	Rhode Island FC	Pittsburgh, PA
7:00PM	Osumanu (yellow card) 42'; Jacquesson 45+5'; Sample 50'; Biasi (yellow card) 55'; Griffin (yellow card) 74'; Mertz (yellow card) 80'	Report	Turnbull (yellow card) 35'; Yao (yellow card) 80'	Stadium: Highmark Stadium; Attendance: 5,619; Referee: Abdou Ndiaye

September 14 28	Orange County SC	1–0	Rhode Island FC	Irvine, CA
10:00PM	Jamison 31'; Powers (yellow card) 44'; Zubak (yellow card) 80'	Report	Turnbull (yellow card) 88'	Stadium: Championship Soccer Stadium; Referee: Trevor Wiseman

September 21 29	Rhode Island FC	2–1	FC Tulsa	Smithfield, RI
7:30PM	Yao (yellow card) 14'; Herivaux (yellow card) 31'; Fuson (yellow card) 64' (goal) 69'; Dikwa 90+2'	Report	Bibout 8'; Diallo (yellow card) 45+3'; Peñaranda (yellow card) 58'	Stadium: Beirne Stadium; Attendance: 5,252; Referee: Adam Kilpatrick

September 28 30	San Antonio FC	1–3	Rhode Island FC	San Antonio, TX
8:30PM	Agudelo 20'; Burá (yellow card) 44'; Lambert (yellow card) 79'; Gomez (yellow card) 86'; Solignac (yellow card) 86'	Report	Dikwa 1' (yellow card) 62'; Herivaux (yellow card) 17'; Holstad (yellow card) 25' (goal) 51'; Nodarse (yellow card) 43'; Fuson (yellow card) 45' (yellow-red card) 85'; Brito 83'; Stoneman (yellow card) 86'; Kwizera (yellow card) 90+2'	Stadium: Toyota Field; Attendance: 6,620; Referee: Sergii Demianchuk

October 5 31	Rhode Island FC	3–1	Tampa Bay Rowdies	Smithfield, RI
7:30PM	Herivaux 21'; Williams (yellow card) 29' (goal) 85'; Fuson 69'; Holstad (yellow card) 77'; Ybarra (yellow card) 81'	Report	Hilton (yellow card) 27'; Niyongabire (yellow card) 65'; Arteaga 71'	Stadium: Beirne Stadium; Attendance: 3,991; Referee: Elton Garcia

October 13 32	Rhode Island FC	0–0	Loudoun United FC	Smithfield, RI
4:00PM	Williams (yellow card) 37'; Herivaux (yellow card) 43'	Report	Aboukoura (yellow card) 27'; Skundrich (yellow card) 40'; McCabe (yellow card) 51'	Stadium: Beirne Stadium; Attendance: 4,179; Referee: Jeremy Scheer

October 19 33	Charleston Battery	1–1	Rhode Island FC	Mount Pleasant, SC
7:30PM	Smith (yellow card) 56'; Myers 71'; Crawford (yellow card) 90+5'	Report	Ybarra (yellow card) 16'; Fuson 45+2'; Holstad (yellow card) 49'	Stadium: Patriots Point Soccer Complex; Attendance: 3,480; Referee: Matthew Thompson

October 26 34	Rhode Island FC	8–1	Miami FC	Smithfield, RI
8:00PM	Fuson 10'; Williams 16', 40' (pen.), 45+4' (yellow card) 47'; Ybarra 31'; Nodarse 54'; Dikwa 75'; Kwizera 82'; Shapiro-Thompson (yellow card) 88'	Report	Lawrence 45+1' (yellow card) 79'; Palacios (yellow card) 64'; Genzano (yellow card) 86'; Ayimbila (yellow card) 88'	Stadium: Beirne Stadium; Attendance: 5,252; Referee: Elijio Arreguin

=== U.S. Open Cup ===
Along with 15 other teams in the USL Championship, RIFC entered the 2024 U.S. Open Cup in the third round. They played the first ever U.S. Open Cup game in club history in Charlotte, North Carolina against the Charlotte Independence of USL League One. The game ended in a 4–4 draw after extra time, with the Independence advancing to the next round after a penalty shootout.

April 16, 2024 Third Round	Charlotte Independence (USL1) (North Carolina)	4–4 (a.e.t.) (5–4 p)	Rhode Island FC (USLC)	Charlotte, North Carolina
7:00PM	Obregon 26' (pen.), 95'; Mbuyu 35'; Álvarez 72' (yellow card) 81'; Pack (yellow card) 108'; Dimick (yellow card) 120'	Report	McGlynn 11'; Messer 45+2'; Twumasi (yellow card) 50'; Holstad 50'; Doyle (yellow card) 55'; Yao (yellow card) 90+8'; Turnbull 115'	Stadium: American Legion Memorial Stadium; Attendance: 3,865; Referee: Shawn Tehini
	Penalties
	Belmar (penalty scored); Mbuyu (penalty scored); Álvarez (penalty missed); Spielman (penalty scored); Dimick (penalty missed); Djedje (penalty scored); Sorenson (penalty scored)		Dikwa (penalty missed); Fuson (penalty scored); Kwizera (penalty scored); Doyle (penalty scored); Brito (penalty missed); Holstad (penalty scored); Alves (penalty missed)

=== USL Playoffs ===
November 3 First Round	Indy Eleven	2–3	Rhode Island FC	Indianapolis, IN
1:00PM	Quinn 35'; Martínez (yellow card) 45+2' (goal) 76'; Foster (yellow card) 58'; Musa (yellow card) 69'; Ofeimu (yellow card) 90+2'	Report	Williams 19' (pen.), 38', 52'; Herivaux (yellow card) 81'	Stadium: Carroll Stadium; Attendance: 7,623; Referee: Joshua Encarnación

November 9 Eastern Conference Semi-final	Louisville City FC	0–3	Rhode Island FC	Louisville, KY
7:30PM		Report	Williams 9', 78'; Nodarse (yellow card) 11'; Holstad (yellow card) 72'; Dikwa 90+2'; Yao (yellow card) 90+7'	Stadium: Lynn Family Stadium; Attendance: 9,510; Referee: Elton García

November 16 Eastern Conference Final	Charleston Battery	1–2	Rhode Island FC	Mount Pleasant, SC
7:00PM	Markanich (yellow card) 52'; Torres 61'; Ycaza (yellow card) 90+2'	Report	Herivaux 43' (yellow card) 45+3'; Fuson 53'; Holstad (yellow card) 69'; Williams (yellow card) 76'; Doyle (yellow card) 89'; Dikwa (yellow card) 90+2'	Stadium: Patriots Point Soccer Complex; Attendance: 5,087; Referee: Calin Radosav

November 23 USL Championship Game	Colorado Springs Switchbacks	3–0	Rhode Island FC	Colorado Springs, CO
12:00PM	Mahoney (yellow card) 14'; Tejada 22'; Henríquez 42'; Damus 53'	Report		Stadium: Weidner Field; Attendance: 8,023; Referee: Ricardo Fierro

== Player statistics ==
=== Goals ===
Place	Pos.	No.	Name	USL Championship	US Open Cup	USLC Playoffs	Total
1	FW	10	(Cameroon) Albert Dikwa	10	0	1	11
1	FW	9	(United States) JJ Williams	6	0	5	11
3	FW	11	(United States) Noah Fuson	8	0	1	9
4	DF	15	(Cuba) Frank Nodarse	6	0	0	6
5	DF	12	(United States) Clay Holstad	4	1	0	5
5	MF	20	(Haiti) Zachary Herivaux	4	0	1	5
7	DF	3	(United States) Stephen Turnbull	3	1	0	4
8	MF	17	(Rwanda) Jojea Kwizera	3	0	0	3
8	MF	18	(United States) Joe Brito	3	0	0	3
10	MF	28	(United States) Conor McGlynn	1	1	0	2
10	MF	80	(Puerto Rico) Isaac Angking	2	0	0	2
10	FW	14	(Republic of Ireland) Mark Doyle	2	0	0	2
13	DF	2	(England) Nathan Messer	0	1	0	1
13	DF	24	(Canada) Karifa Yao	1	0	0	1
13	DF	5	(United States) Grant Stoneman	1	0	0	1
13	MF	23	(United States) Marc Ybarra	1	0	0	1
Own Goals				1	0	0	1
Total				56	4	8	68

=== Assists ===
Place	Pos.	No.	Name	USL Championship	US Open Cup	USLC Playoffs	Total
1	FW	11	(United States) Noah Fuson	10	0	0	10
2	FW	9	(United States) JJ Williams	7	0	0	7
3	MF	17	(Rwanda) Jojea Kwizera	5	0	1	6
4	FW	10	(Cameroon) Albert Dikwa	4	0	0	4
4	MF	23	(United States) Marc Ybarra	4	0	0	4
4	MF	18	(United States) Joe Brito	4	0	0	4
7	DF	3	(United States) Stephen Turnbull	3	0	0	3
7	MF	8	(United States) Jack Panayotou	3	0	0	3
7	MF	20	(Haiti) Zachary Herivaux	3	0	0	3
10	DF	4	(Canada) Karifa Yao	1	0	1	2
10	FW	12	(United States) Clay Holstad	1	0	1	2
12	GK	22	(Australia) Jackson Lee	1	0	0	1
12	DF	4	(United States) Collin Smith	0	1	0	1
12	FW	14	(Republic of Ireland) Mark Doyle	0	1	0	1
12	MF	80	(Puerto Rico) Isaac Angking	1	0	0	1
12	DF	15	(Cuba) Frank Nodarse	0	0	1	1
Total				47	2	4	53

=== Clean Sheets ===
Place	Pos.	No.	Name	USL Championship	US Open Cup	USLC Playoffs	Total
1	GK	1	(Spain) Koke Vegas	6	0	1	7
2	GK	22	(Australia) Jackson Lee	3	0	0	3
Total				9	0	1	10

=== Disciplinary ===
No.	Pos.	Name	USL Championship		US Open Cup		USLC Playoffs		Total	
No.	Pos.	Name	Yellow card	Red card	Yellow card	Red card	Yellow card	Red card	Yellow card	Red card
1	GK	(Spain) Koke Vegas	1	1					1	1
3	DF	(United States) Stephen Turnbull	6						6	
4	DF	(United States) Collin Smith	2						2	
5	DF	(United States) Grant Stoneman	5						5	
6	DF	(Germany) Morris Duggan	1						1	
7	MF	(Liberia) Prince Saydee	1						1	
9	FW	(United States) JJ Williams	7				1		8	
10	FW	(Cameroon) Albert Dikwa	7				1		8	
11	FW	(United States) Noah Fuson	6	1					6	1
12	DF	(United States) Clay Holstad	11				2		13	
14	FW	(Republic of Ireland) Mark Doyle	3		1		1		5	
15	DF	(Cuba) Frank Nodarse	8				1		9	
16	DF	(Brazil) Gabriel Alves	3						3	
17	MF	(Rwanda) Jojea Kwizera	8						8	
18	MF	(United States) Joe Brito	2						2	
20	MF	(Haiti) Zachary Herivaux	5				2		7	
21	MF	(Ghana) Kofi Twumasi	3		1				4	
22	GK	(Australia) Jackson Lee	2						2	
23	MF	(United States) Marc Ybarra	6						6	
24	DF	(Canada) Karifa Yao	7		1		1		9	
28	MF	(United States) Conor McGlynn	2	2					2	2
77	MF	(United States) Amos Shapiro-Thompson	1						1	
Total			97	4	3	0	9	0	109	4

== League Honors ==
2024 Season

- USL Championship Golden Playmaker
  - Noah Fuson – Most Regular Season Assists
- USL Championship Comeback Player of the Year
  - Zachary Herivaux
- USL Championship Player of the Month
  - JJ Williams – October
- USL Championship Player of the Week
  - Zachary Herivaux – Week 20
  - JJ Williams – Week 34
- USL Championship Team of the Week
  - Joe Brito – Week 16 (bench)
  - Albert Dikwa – Week 3, 19, 30
  - Mark Doyle – Week 13 (bench)
  - Noah Fuson – Week 20 (bench), 29, 34 (bench)
  - Zachary Herivaux – Week 34
  - Clay Holstad – Week 2, 30
  - Jojea Kwizera – Week 16, 17, 29 (bench), 30, 34 (bench)
  - Jackson Lee – Week 5, 6
  - Frank Nodarse – Week 18, 21
  - Stephen Turnbull – Week 7, 16, 26
  - Koke Vegas – Week 12, 25
  - JJ Williams – Week 31
  - Marc Ybarra – Week 18
- USL Championship Coach of the Week
  - Khano Smith – Week 7, 16
- USL Championship Coach of the Month
  - Khano Smith – July
