= 2025 Birmingham Legion FC season =

American soccer club season

Birmingham Legion FC
2025 season
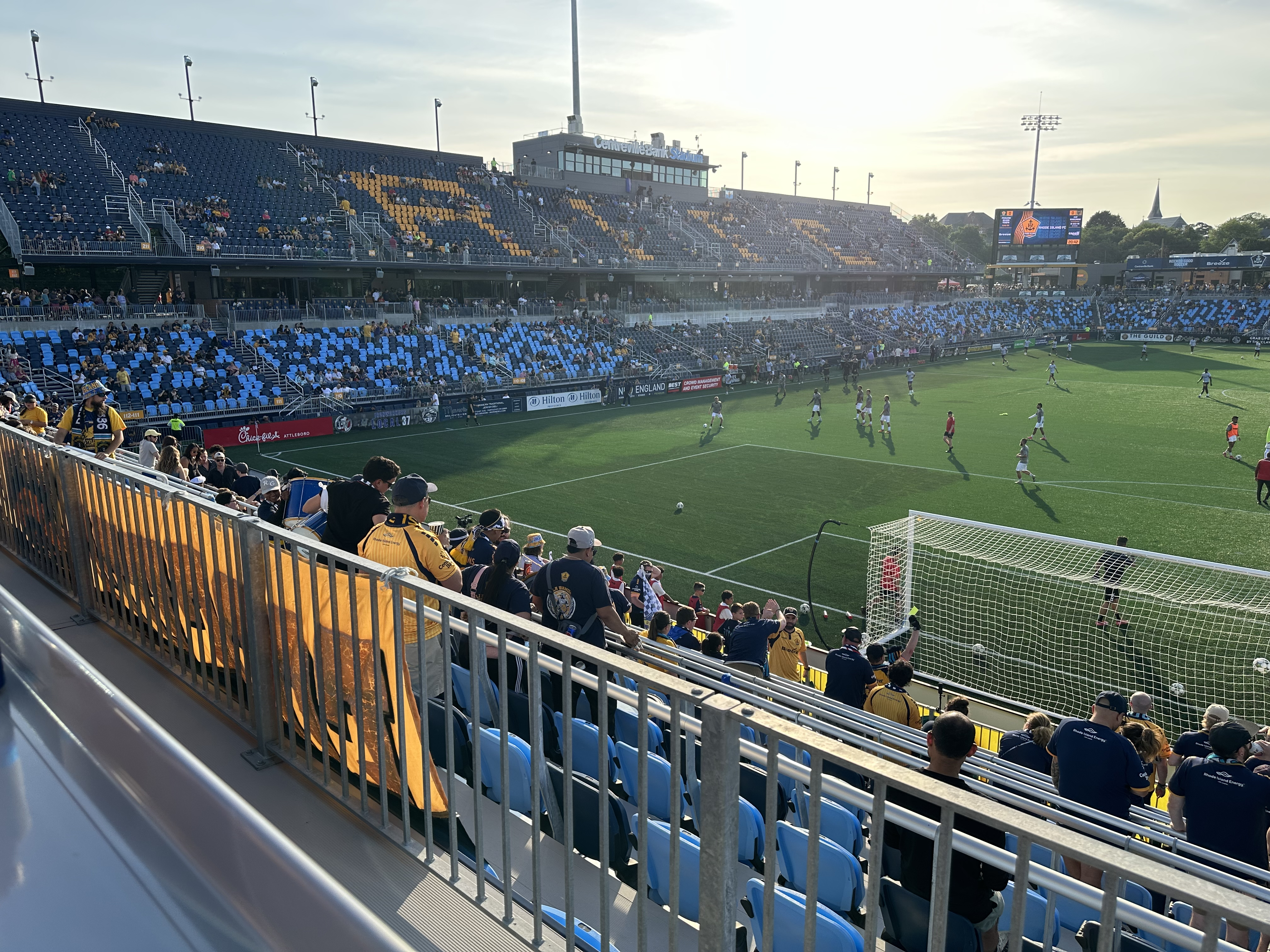
- Birmingham Legion players warming up prior to a 2025 match against Rhode Island FC at Centreville Bank Stadium
- General Manager: Jay Heaps
- Head Coach: Tom Soehn
- Stadium: Protective Stadium
- USL Championship: Eastern Conference: 12th
- Playoffs: DNQ
- U.S. Open Cup: First Round
- USL Cup: Quarter-finals
Home colors	Away colors

The 2025 Birmingham Legion season was the seventh season of play in the club's history in the USL Championship, the second tier of American soccer.

== Squad Information ==
=== Roster ===
As of April 4, 2025

Note: Flags indicate national team as defined under FIFA eligibility rules; some limited exceptions apply. Players may hold more than one non-FIFA nationality.

No.	Pos.	Nation	Player
1	GK	USA	Matt Van Oekel
2	DF	USA	Stephen Turnbull
3	DF	RWA	Phanuel Kavita
4	DF	USA	Ramiz Hamouda
5	DF	USA	Ethan Kos
7	FW	MEX	Danny Trejo
8	MF	USA	Kobe Hernandez-Foster
9	FW	HAI	Ronaldo Damus (on loan from GIF Sundsvall)
10	FW	CMR	Tabort Etaka Preston
11	MF	USA	Dawson McCartney
13	DF	USA	Jake Rufe
15	FW	CAN	Tyler Pasher

No.	Pos.	Nation	Player
18	GK	USA	Trevor Spangenberg
19	MF	URU	Enzo Martínez
20	DF	GRN	A. J. Paterson
21	FW	URU	Sebastian Tregarthen
22	FW	BRA	Lucca Dourado
25	MF	USA	Roman Torres (on loan from Minnesota United 2)
32	MF	NGA	Temi Ereku
33	DF	GHA	Moses Mensah
43	DF	USA	Tiago Suarez (on loan from New England Revolution)
47	MF	USA	Finn Calloway
57	GK	MEX	Fernando Delgado
—	MF	AUS	Sam McIllhatton

== Competitions ==
=== USL Championship ===
==== Standings ====
Pos	Team	Pld	W	L	T	GF	GA	GD	Pts	Qualification
8	Detroit City FC	30	9	11	10	33	35	−2	37	Playoffs
9	Indy Eleven	30	10	15	5	44	52	−8	35	
10	Tampa Bay Rowdies	30	9	14	7	43	50	−7	34	
11	Miami FC	30	8	16	6	29	44	−15	30	
12	Birmingham Legion FC	30	5	13	12	36	50	−14	27	

Source: USL Championship Standings
Rules for classification: 1) head-to-head points; 2) head-to-head goal differential; 3) points-per-game within conference; 4) total wins; 5) total goal differential; 6) total goals scored; 7) points earned against top four Conference finishers; 8) disciplinary points; 9) coin toss or drawing of lots

==== Match results ====
On December 19, 2024, the USL Championship released the regular season schedule for all 24 teams.

All times in Central Time Zone.

March 8, 2025 1	Birmingham Legion FC	1–3	Loudoun United FC	Birmingham, Alabama
8:00 PM	Rufe 2' (yellow card) 75'; Kavita (yellow card) 31'; Hamouda (yellow card) 58'; Mensah (yellow card) 70'	Report	Erlandson 5'; Aboukoura 33'; Ryan 50'; Bidois (yellow card) 82'	Stadium: Protective Stadium; Attendance: 2,762; Referee: Natalie Simon

March 16, 2025 2	Birmingham Legion FC	1–1	Louisville City FC	Birmingham, Alabama
8:00 PM	Martínez (yellow card) 10'; Torres (yellow card) 40'; Damus 47'; Hamouda (yellow card) 53'	Report	M. Perez 30'; A. Perez (yellow card) 40'; Duncan (yellow card) 47'	Stadium: Protective Stadium; Attendance: 3,724; Referee: Kyle Johnston

March 22, 2025 3	Detroit City FC	2–2	Birmingham Legion FC	Hamtramck, Michigan
8:00 PM	Smith 20'; Morris 33'; Williams (yellow card) 83'	Report	Damus 27'; Tregarthen (yellow card) 76'; Carroll 80' (o.g.)	Stadium: Keyworth Stadium; Attendance: 6,642; Referee: John Griggs

March 29, 2025 4	Pittsburgh Riverhounds FC	2–0	Birmingham Legion FC	Pittsburgh, Pennsylvania
8:00 PM	O'Toole (yellow card) 15'; Mertz 36'; Griffin 70'	Report	Damus (yellow card) 72'	Stadium: Highmark Stadium; Attendance: 4,377; Referee: Nabil Bensalah

April 13, 2025 5	Birmingham Legion FC	3–1	El Paso Locomotive FC	Birmingham, Alabama
4:00 PM	Damus 30' 61'; Pasher (yellow card) 45+2'; McCartney 90+4'	Report	Cabrera 26'; Calvillo (yellow card) 90+7'	Stadium: Protective Stadium; Attendance: 6,920; Referee: Abdou Ndiaye

April 19, 2025 6	Hartford Athletic	1–0	Birmingham Legion FC	Pittsburgh, Pennsylvania
3:00 PM	Beckford 71'; Samadia (yellow card) 90+4'	Report	Trejo (yellow card) 34'; Hamouda (yellow card) 44'; Rufe (yellow card) 66'	Stadium: Trinity Health Stadium; Attendance: 4,034; Referee: Elvis Osmanovic

May 3, 2025 7	Tampa Bay Rowdies	2–2	Birmingham Legion FC	St. Petersburg, Florida
6:30 PM	Fernandes 26' (pen.); Niyongabire 90+3'; Lasso (yellow card) 90+6'	Report	Martínez 70'; Trejo 76'; Tabortetaka (yellow card) 90+5'	Stadium: Al Lang Stadium; Attendance: 4,504; Referee: Abdou Ndiaye

May 14, 2025 8	Birmingham Legion FC	0–1	Rhode Island FC	Birmingham, Alabama
7:00	McIllhatton (yellow card) 5' (red card) 45'; Hamouda (yellow card) 43'; Torres (yellow card) 90+4'	Report	Rodríguez 14'	Stadium: Protective Stadium; Attendance: 3,767; Referee: Luis Arroyo

May 18, 2025 9	Birmingham Legion FC	1–1	Detroit City FC	Birmingham, Alabama
4:00	Laszo (yellow card) 66'; Martínez (yellow card) 69'; Kavita 81'; Hernandez-Foster (yellow card) 82'	Report	Rutz (yellow card) 40'; Villanueva 46'; Chapman (yellow card) 76'; Polisi (yellow card) 86'	Stadium: Protective Stadium; Attendance: 4,527; Referee: Jeremy Scheer

May 24, 2025 10	Miami FC	1–2	Birmingham Legion FC	Miami, Florida
6:00	Bonfiglio 39' (yellow card) 70'; Melano (yellow card) 45+1'	Report	Pasher 48'; Damus 74'; Suárez (yellow card) 84'; Van Oekel (yellow card) 90+7'	Stadium: Pitbull Stadium; Attendance: 1,011; Referee: Natalie Simon

June 4, 2025 11	Birmingham Legion FC	0–1	Indy Eleven	Birmingham, AL
8:00 PM EST	Centeno (yellow card) 16'; Damus (yellow card) 70'; Hernandez-Foster (yellow card) 75'; Torres (yellow card) 76'	Report	Lindley 4'; Musa (yellow card) 27'; O'Brien (yellow card) 90+1'; Murphy (yellow card) 90+4'	Stadium: Protective Stadium; Attendance: 4,332; Referee: Elton Garcia

June 14, 2025 12	Louisville City FC	4–2	Birmingham Legion FC	Louisville, Kentucky
7:00 PM	Dia 29'; Goodrum 30', 44', 5'	Report	Damus 15'; Moguel Jr. 90' (o.g.)	Stadium: Lynn Family Stadium; Attendance: 8,802; Referee: Mark Verso

June 18, 2025 13	Birmingham Legion FC	1−0	Sacramento Republic FC	Birmingham, Alabama
5:00 PM	Tregarthen 90+4'	Report		Stadium: Protective Stadium; Referee: Alyssa Nichols

June 21, 2025 14	Birmingham Legion FC	0-1	Oakland Roots SC	Birmingham, Alabama
7:00 PM		Report	Greene 55' (pen.)	Stadium: Protective Stadium; Attendance: 4,725; Referee: Joshua Encarnación

July 2, 2025 15	Birmingham Legion FC	0–0	Charleston Battery	Birmingham, Alabama
7:00 PM		Report		Stadium: Protective Stadium; Attendance: 5,805; Referee: Matthew Thompson

July 5, 2025 16	Rhode Island FC	1–1	Birmingham Legion FC	Pawtucket, Rhode Island
6:00 PM	Fuson 44'	Report	Damus 27'	Stadium: Centreville Bank Stadium; Attendance: 10,734; Referee: Abdou Ndiaye

July 11, 2025 17	North Carolina FC	2–3	Birmingham Legion FC	Cary, North Carolina
6:30 PM	Dolabella 40'; Conway 90+9'	Report	Damus 45'; Trejo 56', 63'	Stadium: WakeMed Soccer Park; Attendance: 2,269; Referee: Thomas Snyder

July 19, 2025 18	Birmingham Legion FC	0–1	Colorado Springs Switchbacks FC	Birmingham, Alabama
7:00 PM		Report	Micaletto 83'	Stadium: Protective Stadium; Attendance: 5,007; Referee: Elvis Osmanovic

August 2, 2025 19	Phoenix Rising FC	3–3	Birmingham Legion FC	Phoenix, Arizona
9:30 PM	Cuello 16'; Avayevu 25'; Dennis 90'	Report	Pasher 39'; Tregarthen 54'; Martínez 64'	Stadium: Phoenix Rising Soccer Stadium; Attendance: 3,757; Referee: John Matto

August 9, 2025 20	Birmingham Legion FC	1–4	Hartford Athletic	Birmingham, Alabama
7:00 PM	Martínez 90+5'	Report	Dieng 27' (pen.), 29'; Edwards 90+1'; Obalola 90+3'	Stadium: Protective Stadium; Attendance: 5,007; Referee: Servando Berna Rico

August 23, 2025 21	Birmingham Legion FC	1−1	Pittsburgh Riverhounds SC	Birmingham, Alabama
7:00 PM	Damus 28'	Report	Williams 66'	Stadium: Protective Stadium; Referee: Trevor Wiseman

August 30, 2025 22	Orange County SC	4–4	Birmingham Legion FC	Irvine, California
9:00 PM	Miles 24'; Zubak 43' (pen.); Guimaraes 54'; Hegardt 66'	Report	Daley 3'; Damus 28'; Latinovich 52' (o.g.); Tregarthen 62'	Stadium: Championship Soccer Stadium; Attendance: 5,000; Referee: Corbyn May

September 6, 2025 23	FC Tulsa	1–1	Birmingham Legion FC	Tulsa, Oklahoma
7:30 PM	Cerato (yellow card) 45+5'; Calheira 45+9'; ElMedkhar (yellow card) 58'; Batista (yellow card) 90+2'	Report	Tregarthen (yellow card) 17'; Martínez (yellow card) 32'; Spencer (yellow card) 42'; Travis (yellow card) 45+9'; Suarez (yellow card) 55'; Rufe 87'	Stadium: ONEOK Field; Attendance: 4,012; Referee: Muhammad Kaleia

September 17, 2025 24	Birmingham Legion FC	1–4	Tampa Bay Rowdies	Birmingham, Alabama
7:00 PM	McCartney 12'; Tregarthen (yellow card) 77'		Crisostomo (yellow card) 38'; Arteaga 64'; Marie 68', 89', (yellow card) 90+2'; Carlos Azócar (yellow card) 90+6'; Álvarez 90+8'	Stadium: Protective Stadium; Attendance: 5,113; Referee: John Griggs

September 21, 2025 25	Indy Eleven	2–1	Birmingham Legion	Indianapolis, Indiana
4:00 PM	Kizza 54'; Ofeimu 60'	Report	Vassell 12'; Travis (yellow card) 33'; Turnbull (yellow card) 90+3'	Stadium: Carroll Stadium; Attendance: 10,375; Referee: Alyssa Pennington

September 27, 2025 26	San Antonio FC	0–0	Birmingham Legion FC	San Antonio, Texas
6:00 PM		Report		Stadium: Toyota Field; Attendance: 7,009; Referee: Luis Arroyo

October 1, 2025 27	Birmingham Legion FC	1–1	North Carolina FC	Birmingham, Alabama
7:00 PM	Turnbull 90+6'	Report	Forbes 32'	Stadium: Protective Stadium; Attendance: 3,935; Referee: Calin Radosav

October 4, 2025 28	Loudoun United FC	0–1	Birmingham Legion FC	Leesburg, Virginia
4:00 PM	Ryan (red card) 90+4'	Report	Paterson 29' (pen.)	Stadium: Segra Field; Attendance: 2,681; Referee: Edson Carvajal

October 19, 2025 29	Birmingham Legion FC	2–3	Miami FC	Birmingham, Alabama
4:00 PM	Paterson 15'; Damus 66'	Report	Bonfiglio 8'; Ricketts 22'; Campisi (red card) 23'; Zárate 38'	Stadium: Protective Stadium; Referee: Robert Vincze

October 25, 2025 30	Charleston Battery	2–1	Birmingham Legion FC	Mt. Pleasant, South Carolina
5:00 PM	Landry 34'; Jennings 55' (pen.)	Report	Tabortetaka 6'; Kavita (red card) 53'	Stadium: Patriots Point Soccer Complex; Attendance: 4,737; Referee: Drew Klemp

=== USL Cup ===
The Legion participated in the second edition of the USL Cup, the first edition to feature teams from both the USL Championship and League One.

==== Group standings ====
Pos	Lg	Team	Pld	W	PKW	PKL	L	GF	GA	GD	Pts	Qualification
1	USLC	Indy Eleven	4	3	1	0	0	8	2	+6	11	Advance to knockout stage
2	USLC	Birmingham Legion FC	4	3	0	1	0	8	4	+4	10	Advance to knockout stage (wild card)
3	USL1	Chattanooga Red Wolves SC	4	1	1	0	2	4	8	−4	5	
4	USLC	FC Tulsa	4	1	0	1	2	8	7	+1	4	
5	USL1	Forward Madison FC	4	1	0	1	2	3	7	−4	4	
6	USL1	One Knoxville SC	4	0	1	0	3	2	5	−3	2	

Updated to match(es) played on July 26, 2025. Source: USL

==== Group stage ====
April 27, 2025	Birmingham Legion FC	3–1	Chattanooga Red Wolves SC	Birmingham, Alabama
4:00 PM CDT	Trejo 10'; Damus (yellow card) 42' (goal) 79'; Tabortetaka 71'; Delgado (yellow card) 86'; Hamouda (yellow card) 90+2'	Report	Jérez (yellow card) 32'; Watters (yellow card) 63'; Knapp (red card) 65'; Hernández (yellow card) 86'; Kinzner 90+4'	Stadium: Protective Stadium; Attendance: 4,509; Referee: Elton García

May 31, 2025	FC Tulsa	1–2	Birmingham Legion FC	Tulsa, Oklahoma
7:30 PM CDT	ElMedkhar 62'	Report	Damus 59' (pen.); Tregarthen 68'	Stadium: Oneok Field; Attendance: 4,467; Referee: Benjamin Meyer

June 28, 2025	Indy Eleven	1–1 (7–6 p)	Birmingham Legion FC	Indianapolis, Indiana
7:00 PM EDT	O'Brien 28'	Report	Preston 90+4'	Stadium: Michael A. Carroll Stadium; Attendance: 9,028; Referee: Brad Jensen
	Penalties
	Williams (penalty missed); Blake (penalty scored); Lindley (penalty scored); Quinn (penalty scored); McRobb (penalty scored); Rendón (penalty scored); Collier (penalty scored); O'Brien (penalty scored)		(penalty scored) Pasher; (penalty scored) Laszo; (penalty scored) Hernandez-Foster; (penalty scored) Preston; (penalty missed) Damus; (penalty scored) Suárez; (penalty scored) McIllhatton; (penalty missed) Centeno

July 26, 2025	Birmingham Legion FC	2–1	Forward Madison FC	Birmingham, Alabama
7:00 PM CDT	Damus 30'; Saucedo 81'	Report	Angking 71'	Stadium: Protective Stadium; Attendance: 4,626; Referee: Elijio Arreguin

==== Quarter-finals ====
August 20	Rhode Island FC	1–0	Birmingham Legion FC	Pawtucket, Rhode Island
7:00 PM EDT	Atkinson 74'	Report		Stadium: Centreville Bank Stadium; Attendance: 3,703; Referee: Brad Jensen

=== U.S. Open Cup ===
As a member of the USL Championship, the Birmingham Legion entered in the first round of the 110th edition of the U.S. Open Cup, where they were on the losing end of an upset to pre-professional club Little Rock Rangers of USL League 2.

March 19	Little Rock Rangers (USL2) (Arkansas)	1–0	(Alabama) Birmingham Legion (USLC)	Little Rock, Arkansas
7:00 PM CDT	McConnell 48'	Report		Stadium: Episcopal Collegiate School; Attendance: 1,328; Referee: Deshun Beard
