= Jackson Lee (soccer) =

Australian soccer player (born 2001)

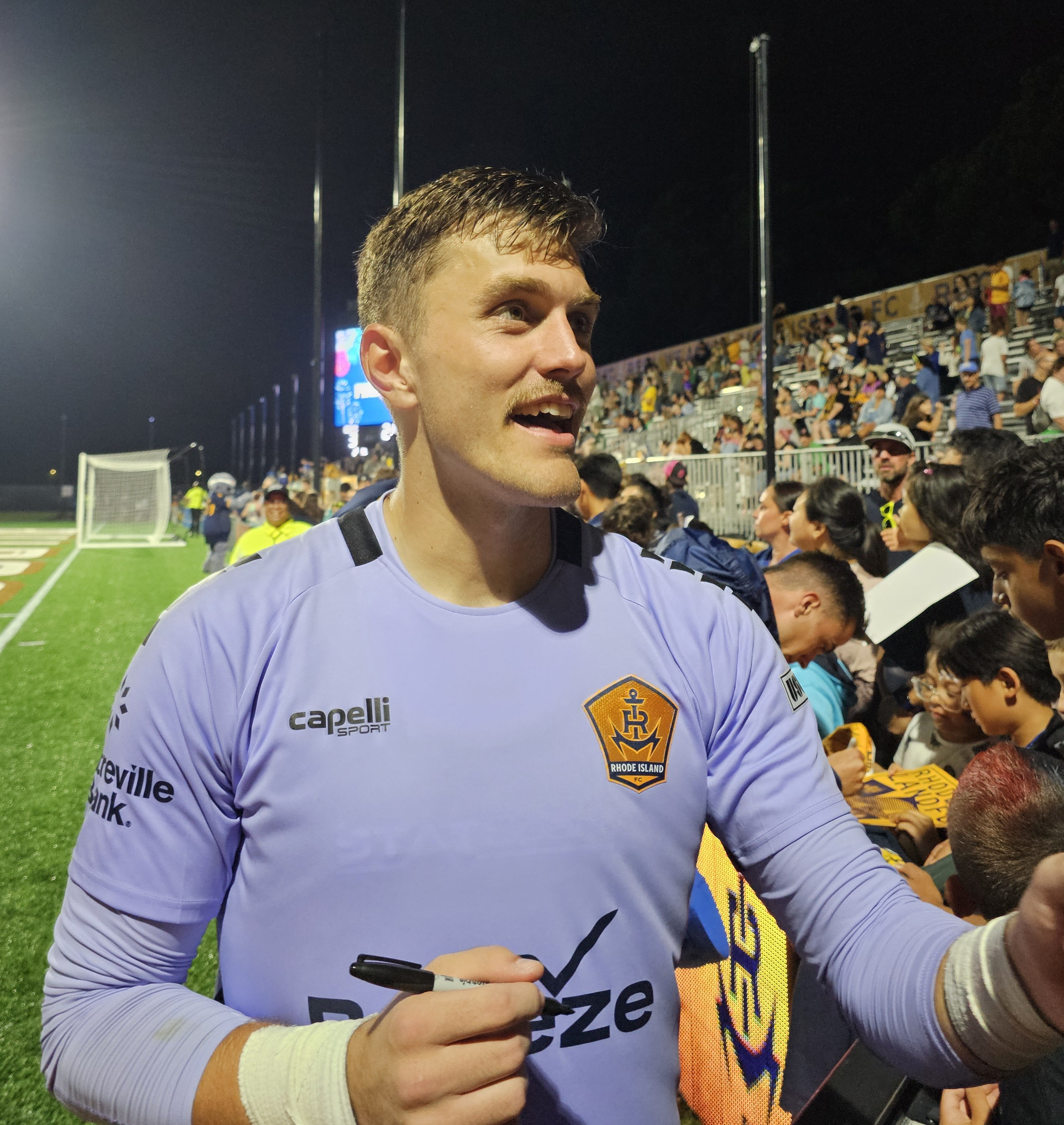
- Lee with Rhode Island FC in 2024

Personal information
- Date of birth: 10 September 2001 (age 25)
- Place of birth: Salt Lake City, Utah, USA
- Height: 1.88 m (6 ft 2 in)
- Position: Goalkeeper

Team information
- Current team: Brooklyn FC
- Number: 1

Youth career
- Perth Glory

College career
Years	Team	Apps	(Gls)
2020–2021	George Mason Patriots	25	(0)
2022–2023	West Virginia Mountaineers	39	(0)

Senior career*
Years	Team	Apps	(Gls)
2018–2019	Perth Glory NPL	37	(0)
2020	Perth SC	9	(0)
2020	Bayswater City SC	2	(0)
2021–2022	The Villages SC	19	(0)
2024–2025	Rhode Island FC	20	(0)
2026	Brooklyn FC	16	(0)

International career
2018–2019	Australia U18		
- * Club domestic league appearances and goals as of 16:20, 4 November 2026 (UTC)

Jackson Lee (born 10 September 2001) is an Australian soccer player who plays for USL Championship club Brooklyn FC.

== Early life ==
Lee played youth soccer with the Perth Glory FC Youth.

== College career ==
In 2020, he began attending George Mason University, where he played for the men's soccer team. On 27 February 2021, he made his collegiate debut in a match against the James Madison Dukes. On March 17, 2021, he recorded his first collegiate shutout in a 0–0 draw against the George Washington Colonials. On 10 April 2021, he played nine minutes as an outfield player against the West Virginia Mountaineers. He was named to the Commissioner's Honor Roll after both his freshman and sophomore seasons.

In 2022, he transferred to West Virginia University to play for their men's soccer team for his junior season. He recorded his first victory for the team in his debut on 25 August 2022 against the Robert Morris Colonials. After his junior season, he was named to the Commissioner's Honor Roll. In November 2023, he was named the school's Student-Athlete of the Week and in December he was named to the TopDrawerSoccer National Team of the Week. In his senior season, he set a school record for most goalkeeper wins with 17. After his senior season, he was named to the All-Sun Belt Conference Second Team, the All-Southeast Region Second Team, the Academic All-District Team, and a Scholar All-American.

== Club career ==
In 2018, he began playing with the Perth Glory NPL side in the NPL Western Australia at age sixteen.

In 2020, he played with Perth SC and Bayswater City SC in the NPL Western Australia.

In 2021 and 2022, Lee played with The Villages SC in USL League Two.

At the 2024 MLS SuperDraft, Lee was selected in the first round (28th overall) by Los Angeles FC. However, a couple of days later, he elected to sign a professional contract with Rhode Island FC of the USL Championship. On 24 March 2024, he made his professional debut, coming on as a substitute, following an injury to starting keeper Koke Vegas with ten minutes remaining in the match. He made his first career start in the next match on 30 March, also picking up his first assist, in a match against the Tampa Bay Rowdies. In his second career start, he recorded the first clean sheet in RIFC history, and was named to the USL Championship Team of the Week for Match Week 5.

== International career ==
In 2018 and 2019, he was called up to the Australia U18 team.

== Career statistics ==
As of match played 15 September 2024

Club	Season	League			Playoffs		National Cup		Continental		Total	
Club	Season	Division	Apps	Goals	Apps	Goals	Apps	Goals	Apps	Goals	Apps	Goals
Perth Glory NPL	2018	NPL Western Australia	25	0	2	0	—		—		0	0
Perth Glory NPL	2019	NPL Western Australia	10	0	—		—		—		4	0
Perth Glory NPL	Total		35	0	2	0	0	0	0	0	37	0
Perth SC	2020	NPL Western Australia	9	0	—		—		—		9	0
Bayswater City SC	2020	NPL Western Australia	2	0	—		—		—		2	0
The Villages SC	2021	USL League Two	9	0	0	0	—		—		9	0
The Villages SC	2022	USL League Two	10	0	1	0	0	0	—		11	0
The Villages SC	Total		19	0	1	0	0	0	0	0	20	0
Rhode Island FC	2024	USL Championship	12	0	0	0	1	0	—		13	0
Career total			77	0	3	0	1	0	0	0	81	0
