= Stephen Turnbull (soccer, born 1998) =

American soccer player

Personal information
- Full name: Stephen Turnbull
- Date of birth: March 13, 1998 (age 28)
- Place of birth: Holtsville, New York, United States
- Position: Defender

Youth career
- –2016: South Huntington Lightning

College career
Years	Team	Apps	(Gls)
2016–2021	Stony Brook Seawolves	55	(1)

Senior career*
Years	Team	Apps	(Gls)
2018–2019	AFC Ann Arbor	19	(1)
2022–2023	New York City FC II	23	(5)
2023	New York City FC	11	(0)
2024	Rhode Island FC	34	(3)
2025	Birmingham Legion	21	(1)
- * Club domestic league appearances and goals as of October 25, 2025

Stephen Turnbull (born March 13, 1998) is an American soccer player.

He previously played for New York City FC in Major League Soccer during the 2023 season.

== Playing career ==
=== Youth ===
Prior to attending college, Turnbull played for local Long Island club South Huntington Lightning; the club was the top-ranked youth side in the U.S. in 2015.

=== College ===
Turnbull attended Stony Brook University, only a few miles from his hometown, between 2016 and 2021, where he played for the Seawolves. In five years he played 55 matches, scoring one goal.

=== Senior ===
On March 24, 2022, Major League Soccer club New York City FC announced a list of players signed for their MLS Next Pro side, NYCFC II, with Turnbull amongst them. His competitive debut came in a loss on penalties to Orlando City B on April 3 while his first goal came in a 7–0 rout of Inter Miami II two weeks later.

He made his first MLS roster appearance on September 4, 2022, when he was called up to the senior roster against New England Revolution. He made his MLS debut on March 4, 2023, against the Chicago Fire FC after being signed on a short-term loan. On April 10, 2023, Turnbull signed permanently to New York City's Major League Soccer roster. Turnbull made his first start on May 31, 2023, against FC Cincinnati. He ended the 2023 season having played in 11 games, making five starts. On October 30, 2023, his team option for the 2024 season was declined.

Ahead of the 2024 season, Turnbull signed with Rhode Island FC of the USL Championship. He started 31 of RIFC's 34 regular season games, on a team that made the 2024 USL Championship final. He had three goals and three assists over the course of the season. Turnbull was named to the USL Championship Team of the week three times during the season.

Turnbull transferred to Birmingham Legion FC on January 20, 2025. He was released by Birmingham following their 2025 season.

== Career statistics ==
As of matches played November 23, 2024

Appearances and goals by club, season and competition
Club	Season	League			National cup		Continental		Total	
Club	Season	Division	Apps	Goals	Apps	Goals	Apps	Goals	Apps	Goals
New York City FC II	2022	MLS Next Pro	23	5	—		—		23	5
New York City FC II	2023	MLS Next Pro	6	1	—		—		6	1
New York City FC	2023	MLS	11	0	—		—		11	0
Rhode Island FC	2024	USL	34	3	1	1			35	4
Career total			74	9	1	1	0	0	75	10
