= Sebastian Saucedo =

American soccer player (born 1997)

Sebastián Saucedo
Personal information
- Full name: Sebastián Saucedo Mondragón
- Date of birth: January 22, 1997 (age 29)
- Place of birth: San Fernando Valley, California, U.S.
- Height: 1.70 m (5 ft 7 in)
- Position: Winger

Team information
- Current team: Birmingham Legion
- Number: 23

Youth career
- 2011–2014: Real Salt Lake AZ

Senior career*
| Years | Team | Apps | (Gls) |
| 2014–2019 | Real Salt Lake | 83 | (5) |
| 2015–2016 | Real Monarchs | 13 | (5) |
| 2016 | → Veracruz (loan) | 4 | (0) |
| 2020–2022 | UNAM | 54 | (3) |
| 2022–2023 | Toluca | 15 | (1) |
| 2023–2025 | Juárez | 17 | (1) |
| 2025– | Birmingham Legion | 24 | (2) |

International career
| 2014–2015 | United States U18 | 10 | (1) |
| 2015–2017 | United States U20 | 19 | (8) |
| 2015 | Mexico U20 | 1 | (0) |
| 2019–2021 | United States U23 | 5 | (1) |
Medal record
Representing United States
| Winner | CONCACAF U-20 Championship | 2017 |
- * Club domestic league appearances and goals as of November 2, 2026

Sebastián Saucedo Mondragón (born January 22, 1997), also known as Bofo, is an American professional soccer player who plays as a winger for USL Championship club Birmingham Legion.

== Club career ==
On July 25, 2014, Saucedo signed a homegrown contract with Real Salt Lake, making him the eighth homegrown signing in club history. On March 22, 2015, he made his professional debut for USL affiliate club Real Monarchs SLC in a 0–0 draw against LA Galaxy II. Saucedo was sent on loan to Veracruz in 2016.

On December 9, 2019, it was announced that Saucedo would join UNAM ahead of their 2020 Clausura season.

On June 20, 2025, USL Championship club Birmingham Legion signed Saucedo for the remainder of the 2025 season. A day after signing, Saucedo made his debut with the club when he came on as a 75th-minute substitute for Ronaldo Damus as they lost 1–0 to Oakland Roots.

== International career ==
Saucedo has represented both Mexico and the United States at the under-18 and under-20 levels. He has solely represented the United States since 2015. Saucedo was named to the final 20-player United States under-23 roster for the 2020 CONCACAF Men's Olympic Qualifying Championship in March 2021.

== Personal ==
Saucedo was born in San Fernando Valley, California, and is of Mexican descent.

== Honors ==
Veracruz

- Copa MX: Clausura 2016

United States U20

- CONCACAF Under-20 Championship: 2017
