= Karifa Yao =

Canadian soccer player (born 2000)

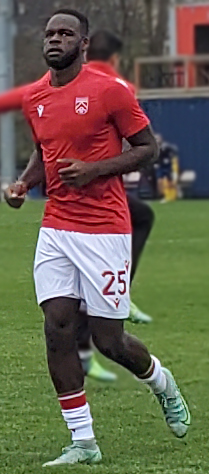
- Yao with Cavalry in 2022

Personal information
- Date of birth: September 28, 2000 (age 26)
- Place of birth: Montreal, Quebec, Canada
- Height: 1.88 m (6 ft 2 in)
- Position: Defender

Team information
- Current team: Rhode Island FC
- Number: 24

Youth career
- CS Fabrose
- Étoiles de l’Est
- 2017–2019: Montreal Impact

Senior career*
Years	Team	Apps	(Gls)
2019–2022	CF Montréal (Note: Montreal Impact changed its name to CF Montréal in 2021)	2	(0)
2021–2022	→ Cavalry FC (loan)	49	(1)
2023	Vancouver Whitecaps FC	1	(0)
2023	Whitecaps FC 2	6	(0)
2024–	Rhode Island FC	81	(4)
- * Club domestic league appearances and goals as of October 31, 2026

Karifa Yao (born September 28, 2000) is a Canadian professional soccer player who plays as a defender for Rhode Island FC of the USL Championship.

== Early life ==
Yao began playing youth soccer at age seven with CS Fabrose. Afterwards, he joined youth club Étoiles de l’Est. He was also part of the National High Performance Centre. In 2017, he joined the Montreal Impact Academy, playing a year with the U17s, before playing two years with the U19s.

== Club career ==
In June 2019, Yao signed a homegrown contract with Montreal Impact. He made his professional debut on September 20, 2020, appearing as a substitute against the Philadelphia Union.

In February 2021, Yao went on a season-long loan to Canadian Premier League side Cavalry FC. On November 20, Yao scored his first professional goal against Pacific FC, netting the equalizer in their 2021 CPL season play-off semi-final, which ultimately ended in a 2-1 defeat for Cavalry. He was selected as Cavalry fans’ Player of the Year in 2021. After the 2021 season, Cavalry announced that Yao would leave the club at the end of his loan spell, and CF Montréal announced that they would exercise the option on Yao's contract for 2022. In March 2022, he extended his contract with Montreal adding another option year, while also returning to Cavalry on loan for a second season. He played a pivotal role for Cavalry, leading all outfield players in minutes played for the team. Over his time with Cavalry, he scored two goals and added two assists in 56 games, across all competitions.

After the 2022 season, his option was declined by Montreal and he departed the club. However, at the 2022 MLS Re-Entry Draft, Vancouver Whitecaps FC announced they had picked up Yao's contract for the 2023 season. He made his debut for the Whitecaps on March 8, in a CONCACAF Champions League match against Honduran club Real España.

In January 2024, he signed a professional contract with USL Championship expansion side Rhode Island FC.

== International career ==
In March 2015, he was called up to a camp with the Canada U15 team. In April 2017, he was called up to a camp with the Canada U17 team.

== Personal life ==
Yao was born in to an Ivorian father and a Senegalese mother.

== Career statistics ==
As of match played October 23, 2026

Club	Season	League			Playoffs		Domestic Cup		Continental		Other		Total	
Club	Season	Division	Apps	Goals	Apps	Goals	Apps	Goals	Apps	Goals	Apps	Goals	Apps	Goals
CF Montréal	2019	Major League Soccer	0	0	–		–		–		–		0	0
CF Montréal	2020	Major League Soccer	2	0	0	0	–		0	0	–		2	0
CF Montréal	Total		2	0	0	0	0	0	0	0	0	0	2	0
Cavalry FC (loan)	2021	Canadian Premier League	25	0	1	1	2	0	–		–		28	1
Cavalry FC (loan)	2022	Canadian Premier League	24	1	2	0	2	0	–		–		28	1
Cavalry FC (loan)	Total		49	1	3	1	4	0	0	0	0	0	56	2
Vancouver Whitecaps FC	2023	Major League Soccer	1	0	0	0	0	0	2	0	1	0	4	0
Whitecaps FC 2	2023	MLS Next Pro	6	0	–		–		–		–		6	0
Rhode Island FC	2024	USL Championship	33	1	4	0	0	0	–		0	0	37	1
Rhode Island FC	2025	USL Championship	25	0	3	0	1	0	–		5	0	34	0
Rhode Island FC	2026	USL Championship	22	2	0	0	3	0	–		4	0	29	2
Rhode Island FC	Total		80	3	7	0	4	0	0	0	9	0	100	3
Career total			138	4	10	1	8	0	2	0	10	0	170	5
