= Albert Dikwa =

Cameroonian footballer (born 1998)

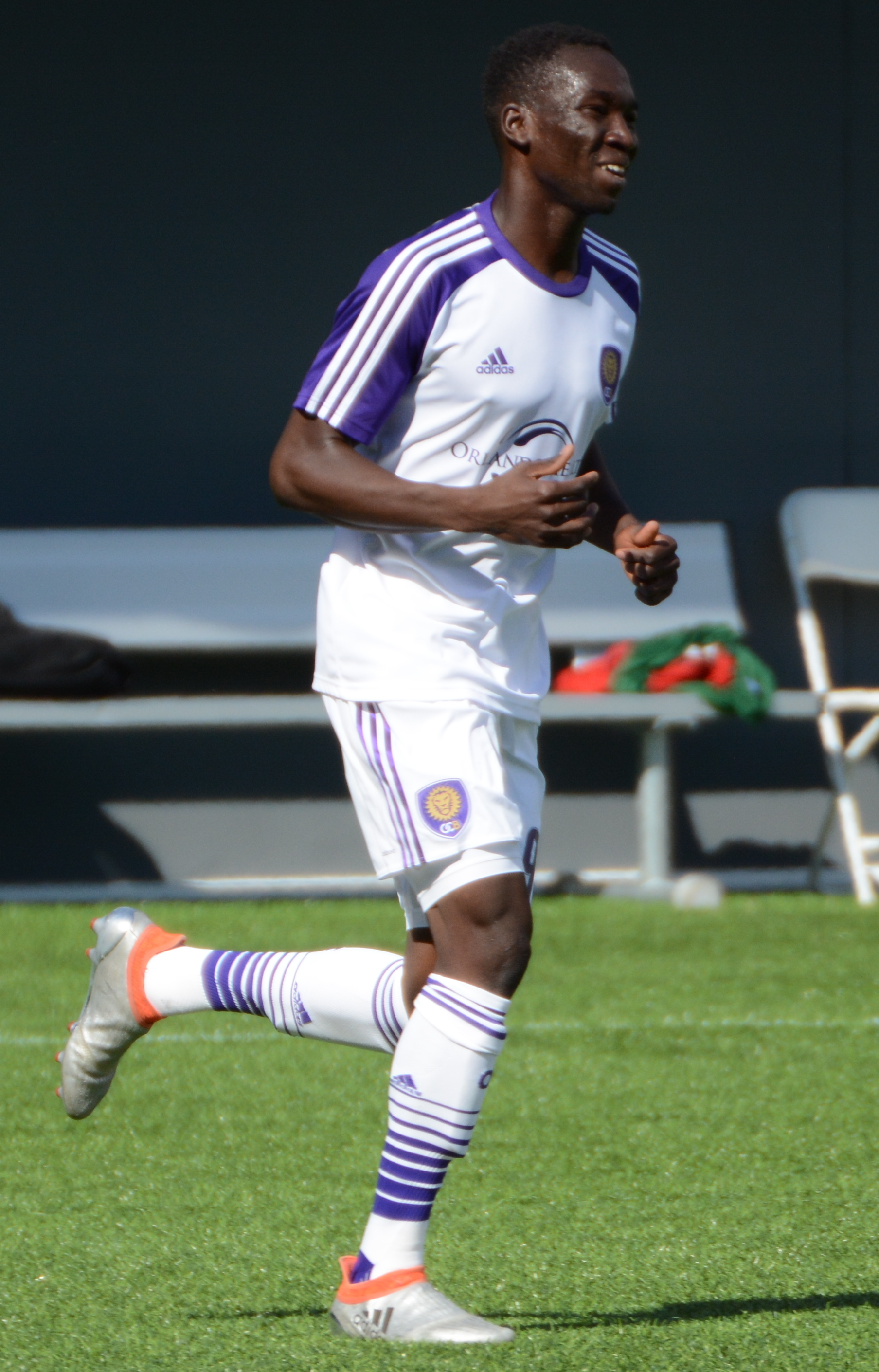
- Dikwa playing for Orlando City B in 2017

Personal information
- Full name: Albert Dikwa Lega
- Date of birth: 2 January 1998 (age 28)
- Place of birth: Garoua, Cameroon
- Height: 1.88 m (6 ft 2 in)
- Position: Forward

Team information
- Current team: Pittsburgh Riverhounds
- Number: 9

Youth career
- Panthère Security de Garoua
- 2014–2017: SIMA

Senior career*
Years	Team	Apps	(Gls)
2017	Orlando City B	22	(3)
2018–2019	Saint Louis FC	44	(4)
2020–2023	Pittsburgh Riverhounds	82	(36)
2024–2025	Rhode Island FC	56	(13)
2026–	Pittsburgh Riverhounds	23	(6)

International career
2014–2018	Cameroon U20	6	(0)
- * Club domestic league appearances and goals as of November 7, 2026

Albert Dikwa Lega (born 2 January 1998) is a Cameroonian footballer who plays as a forward for USL Championship club Pittsburgh Riverhounds.

== Career ==
=== Orlando City B ===
Dikwa signed with United Soccer League side Orlando City B on 9 February 2017. He made his professional debut on 25 March 2017 as a 74th-minute substitute in a 1–0 loss to Tampa Bay Rowdies. Dikwa scored his first professional goal on 9 April 2017 during a 1–1 draw with Charlotte Independence.

=== Saint Louis FC ===
Dikwa signed with USL side Saint Louis FC on 15 December 2017. He made his debut for Saint Louis on 24 March 2018, coming on as a substitution for Austin Martz in a 2–1 loss against San Antonio FC. Dikwa scored his first goal for Saint Louis on 9 May 2018 during a 6–3 loss to LA Galaxy II.

=== Pittsburgh Riverhounds ===
In August 2020, Dikwa joined USL Championship side Pittsburgh Riverhounds SC. He made his debut and scored his first goal for the club on 1 September 2020 in a 3–0 win against Loudoun United. Dikwa was named USL Championship player of the week for week 5 of the 2022 season after notching a goal and an assist in a 4–3 victory over FC Tulsa. In the U.S. Open Cup, he scored the game-winner against Columbus Crew in the 22nd minute, though he later went off with an injury. Dikwa returned to the squad on 8 July, coming on as a substitute for Tola Showunmi at half-time. However, he wasn't able to score and the game ended 0–0. Dikwa won the Golden Boot for the 2023 USL Championship season, leading the league with 20 goals. He became a free agent following Pittsburgh's 2023 season.

=== Rhode Island FC ===
After a successful season with the Riverhounds, Dikwa signed with Rhode Island FC for their inaugural season on a multi-year contract on January 18, 2024. On March 24 2024, he scored his first goal for the club on his second appearance in the form of a brace against Monterey Bay FC.

== Career statistics ==
As of 7 March 2026

Club	Season	League		Playoffs		Cup		League Cup		Total	
Club	Season	Apps	Goals	Apps	Goals	Apps	Goals	Apps	Goals	Apps	Goals
Orlando City B	2017	22	3	0	0	0	0	0	0	22	3
Saint Louis FC	2018	28	3	1	0	2	0	0	0	31	3
Saint Louis FC	2019	16	1	0	0	3	0	0	0	19	1
Saint Louis FC	Total	44	4	1	0	5	0	0	0	50	4
Pittsburgh Riverhounds SC	2020	6	3	1	0	0	0	0	0	7	4
Pittsburgh Riverhounds SC	2021	15	2	0	0	0	0	0	0	15	2
Pittsburgh Riverhounds SC	2022	33	11	0	0	1	0	0	0	34	11
Pittsburgh Riverhounds SC	2023	28	20	1	0	2	0	0	0	31	20
Pittsburgh Riverhounds SC	Total	82	36	2	0	3	0	0	0	87	36
Rhode Island FC	2024	29	10	4	1	1	0	0	0	34	11
Rhode Island FC	2025	26	3	3	2	1	0	4	3	34	8
Rhode Island FC	Total	55	16	7	3	2	0	4	3	68	19
Career total		210	59	10	3	10	0	4	3	227	62
