= Isaac Angking =

Puerto Rican footballer

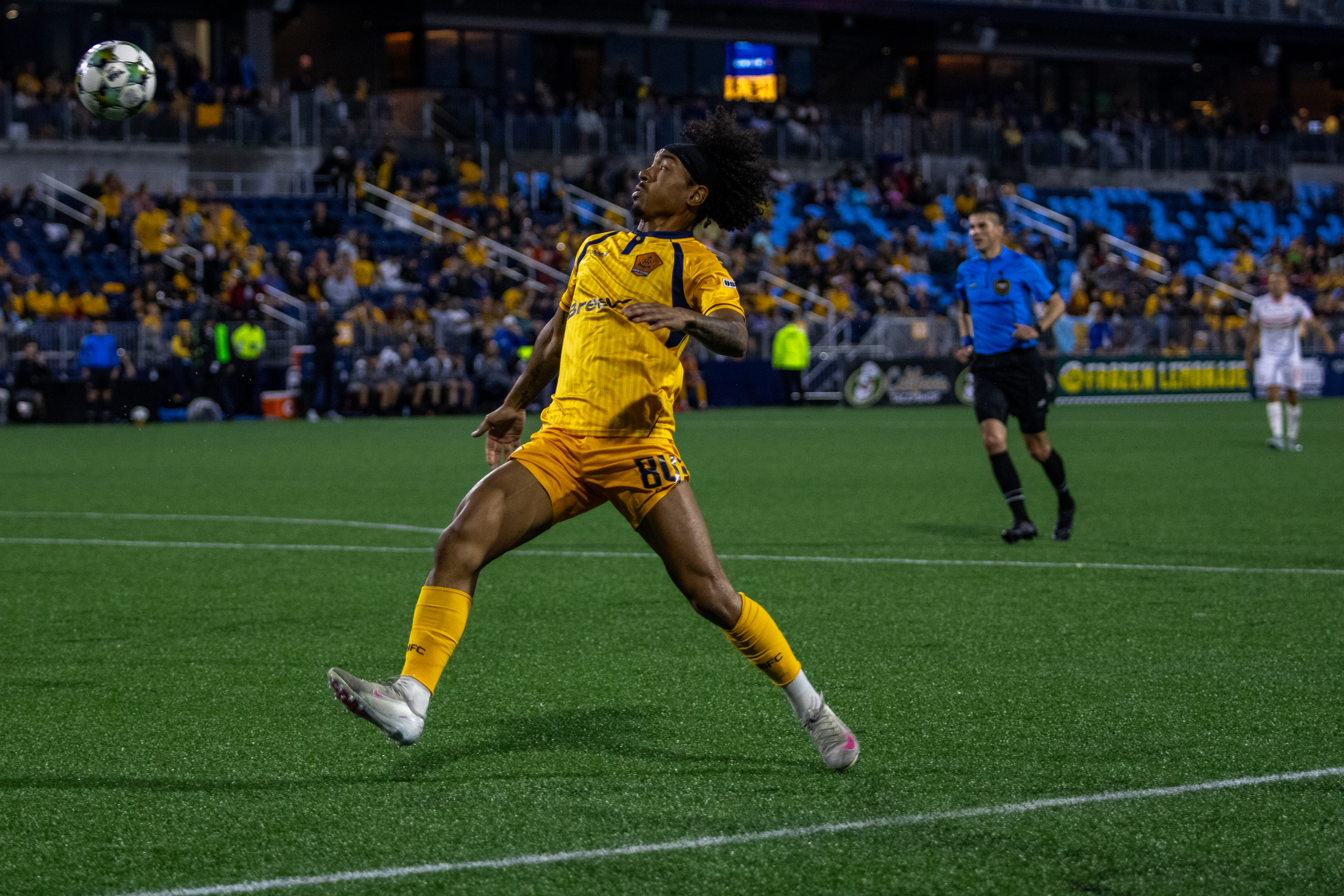
- Angking playing for Rhode Island FC in 2025

Personal information
- Full name: Isaac Emmanuel Angking
- Date of birth: January 24, 2000 (age 26)
- Place of birth: Providence, Rhode Island, United States
- Height: 1.78 m (5 ft 10 in)
- Position: Defensive midfielder

Youth career
- Bayside FC Bolts
- 2015–2018: New England Revolution

Senior career*
Years	Team	Apps	(Gls)
2018, 2020	New England Revolution	3	(0)
2019	→ Hartford Athletic (loan)	0	(0)
2019	→ Charlotte Independence (loan)	5	(0)
2020	New England Revolution II	8	(2)
2022	Columbus Crew 2	18	(1)
2024–2025	Rhode Island FC	12	(2)
2025	→ Forward Madison (loan)	13	(2)

International career^{‡}
2017	United States U17	10	(2)
2018	United States U20	4	(0)
2021–	Puerto Rico	7	(4)
- * Club domestic league appearances and goals as of 13:31, 1 November 2025 (UTC) ‡ National team caps and goals as of 23:40, 9 June 2022 (UTC)

Isaac Emmanuel Angking (born January 24, 2000) is a professional footballer who plays as a midfielder. Born in the United States, he plays for the Puerto Rico national team.

== Early career ==
Angking was born in Providence, Rhode Island, and began his career playing for a local team, Bayside FC Bolts. At the age of 14, he joined the youth sides of MLS side New England Revolution. With their U-19 side, he scored 12 goals in 11 games.

== Club career ==
=== New England Revolution ===
On January 2, 2018, Angking was called up to the New England Revolution Senior Squad—their fourth homegrown player. However, he failed to make an appearance for most of 2018, in part due to an injury he suffered in preseason, setting him aside for majority of the 2018 season. On September 5, 2018, Angking made his first MLS appearance against NYCFC, coming on for Brian Wright. Angking was loaned to the team's USL League One side, New England Revolution II after the conclusion of the MLS is Back Tournament. He scored his first professional goal with the team on August 17, 2020, when he scored two goals against North Texas SC, in a 3–3 draw. On December 8, 2020, Angking was released by New England.

=== Columbus Crew 2 ===
On February 18, 2022, Angking joined Columbus Crew 2, the reserve side of Major League Soccer's Columbus Crew, ahead of their inaugural MLS Next Pro season.

=== Rhode Island FC ===
On April 30, 2024, Angking joined Rhode Island FC (RIFC) of the USL Championship. Angking played primarily as a substitute, debuting on May 4 against North Carolina FC. He scored a late goal in RIFC's July 5 game against Indy Eleven that secured a tie in the game.

Angking was injured during RIFC's August 3 game against Detroit City FC, and tore his anterior cruciate ligament. RIFC announced the injury and that Angking would be out for the remainder of the season. He finished the 2024 season with 8 appearances, two goals, and an assist, in 83 minutes of playing time.

=== Forward Madison FC ===
Angking was sent on loan to Forward Madison FC on July 25, 2025. Angking's first appearance was a day later as a 63rd minute substitute against Birmingham Legion FC in the 2025 USL Cup, and would score Forward Madison's only goal in the 71st minute.

== International career ==
Angking was born in Providence, Rhode Island to a stateside Puerto Rican father and a mother from Sarawak, Malaysia, which makes him eligible to represent either the US, Puerto Rico or Malaysia at the senior level.

=== United States ===
Angking has been capped for various US youth sides, namely the U-17 side in the Nike International Friendlies, where he played in all three games in victories over Brazil, Portugal, and Turkey. However, he missed the U-17 World Cup.

=== Puerto Rico ===
In mid December 2020, Angking was called up by Puerto Rico at senior level for a training camp in the Dominican Republic from January 10 to 20, 2021. He made his international debut on January 19, 2021, as a 68th minute substitution in a 1–0 away friendly win against the Dominican Republic and was booked in the 82nd minute. Angking scored his first goal for Puerto Rico on June 2 against the Bahamas, netting the third goal of an eventual 7–0 victory.

=== International goals ===
Scores and results list Puerto Rico's goal tally first.

No.	Date	Venue	Opponent	Score	Result	Competition
1.	2 June 2021	Mayagüez Athletics Stadium, Mayagüez, Puerto Rico	Bahamas	3–0	7–0	2022 FIFA World Cup qualification
2.	8 June 2021	Georgetown Football Stadium, Georgetown, Guyana	Guyana	2–0	2–0	2022 FIFA World Cup qualification
3.	9 June 2022	Truman Bodden Sports Complex, George Town, Cayman Islands	Cayman Islands	1–0	3–0	2022–23 CONCACAF Nations League C
4.	9 June 2022	Truman Bodden Sports Complex, George Town, Cayman Islands	Cayman Islands	2–0	3–0	2022–23 CONCACAF Nations League C
Last updated 9 June 2022

=== International career statistics ===
As of match played 9 June 2022

Puerto Rico
Year	Apps	Goals
2021	6	2
2022	1	2
Total	7	4
