= Kevin Vang =

American soccer player (born 2000)

Personal information
- Date of birth: August 12, 2000 (age 26)
- Place of birth: United States
- Height: 5 ft 5 in (1.65 m)
- Position: Midfielder

Team information
- Current team: Rhode Island FC
- Number: 19

College career
Years	Team	Apps	(Gls)
2018–2022	Providence Friars		

Senior career*
Years	Team	Apps	(Gls)
2024–	Rhode Island FC	7	(0)
- * Club domestic league appearances and goals

Kevin Vang (born August 12, 2000) is an American soccer player who plays as a midfielder for Rhode Island FC.

== Early life ==
Vang started playing soccer at a young age. He played it with family members as a child. He has nine siblings.

== Education ==
Vang attended Providence College in the United States. He had attended Cranston High School East in the United States.

== Career ==
As a youth player, Vang joined the youth academy of American side New England Revolution. He captained the club.

== Personal life ==
Vang was born in 2000 in the United States. He is of Laotian descent.
