= Jojea Kwizera =

Rwandan footballer (born 1999)

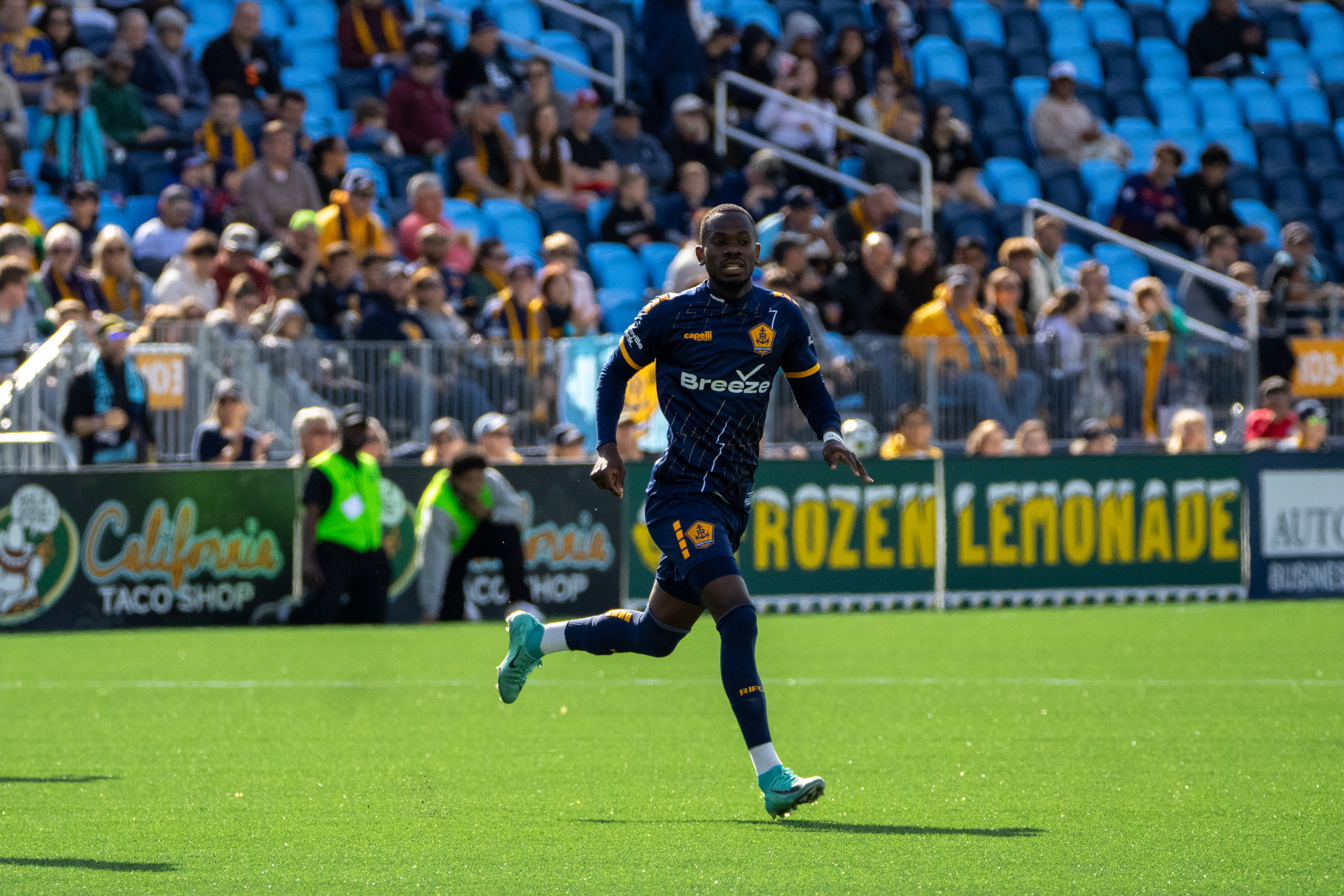
- Kwizera playing for Rhode Island FC during the 2025 USL Championship season

Personal information
- Date of birth: 1 January 1999 (age 27)
- Place of birth: Bukavu, DR Congo
- Height: 1.75 m (5 ft 9 in)
- Position: Midfielder

Team information
- Current team: Rhode Island FC
- Number: 17

College career
| Years | Team | Apps | (Gls) |
| 2017–2018 | Utah State Eastern Eagles | 34 | (7) |
| 2019–2021 | Utah Valley Wolverines | 22 | (6) |

Senior career*
| Years | Team | Apps | (Gls) |
| 2021 | Ogden City | 7 | (5) |
| 2022–2023 | CF Montréal | 12 | (0) |
| 2024– | Rhode Island FC | 78 | (10) |

International career^{‡}
| 2024– | Rwanda | 21 | (4) |
Medal record
Representing Rwanda
Men's football
FIFA Series
| Winner | 2026 Rwanda |
- * Club domestic league appearances and goals as of 15:16, 8 November 2026 (UTC) ‡ National team caps and goals as of 13 November 2026

Jojea Kwizera (born 1 January 1999) is a professional footballer who plays as a midfielder for USL Championship club Rhode Island FC. Born in DR Congo, he plays for the Rwanda national team.

== Club career ==
Kwizera was a first-round pick (15th overall) in the 2022 MLS SuperDraft. He earned 13 starts in 2021 with Utah Valley University, collecting three goals and eight assists. In 2020, he played in seven games as a starter with one goal and two assists for the Wolverines.

On 8 April 2022, Kwizera signed his first contract with CF Montréal during the 2022 season. Kwizera made his professional debut with Montreal in a 4–1 win against Orlando City SC on 7 May 2022.

Upon completion of the 2023 Season, CF Montréal would announce that they would not pick up Kwizera's contract for 2024, ending his time with the club.

== International career ==
Kwizera made his debut for the Rwanda national team on 6 June 2024 in a World Cup qualifier against Benin at the Felix Houphouet Boigny Stadium in the Ivory Coast. He substituted Gilbert Mugisha in the 72nd minute as Benin won the game 1–0. He scored his first international goal 5 days later against Lesotho.

== Personal life ==
Jogea was born in Bukavu to a mother from DRC and a father from Rwanda

== Career statistics ==
=== Club ===
As of 11 October 2022

Appearances and goals by club, season and competition
| Club | League | Season | League | | Playoffs | | Domestic Cup | | Continental | | Total | |
| Club | League | Season | Apps | Goals | Apps | Goals | Apps | Goals | Apps | Goals | Apps | Goals |
|---|---|---|---|---|---|---|---|---|---|---|---|---|
| CF Montréal | MLS | | | | | | | | | | | |
| CF Montréal | MLS | 2022 | 8 | 0 | 0 | 0 | 2 | 0 | 0 | 0 | 10 | 0 |
| Career total | | | 8 | 0 | 0 | 0 | 2 | 0 | 0 | 0 | 10 | 0 |

=== International goals ===
As of match played 13 November 2026

Appearances and goals by national team and year
| National team | Year | Apps | Goals |
|---|---|---|---|
| Rwanda | 2024 | 8 | 1 |
| Rwanda | 2025 | 8 | 1 |
| Rwanda | 2026 | 5 | 2 |
| Total | | 21 | 4 |

As of match played 13 November 2026
Scores and results list Rwanda's goal tally first, score column indicates score after each Kwizera goal.

List of international goals scored by Jojea Kwizera
| No. | Date | Venue | Opponent | Score | Result | Competition |
|---|---|---|---|---|---|---|
| 1 | 11 June 2024 | Moses Mabhida Stadium, Durban, South Africa | Lesotho | 1–0 | 1–0 | 2026 FIFA World Cup qualification |
| 2 | 25 March 2025 | Amahoro Stadium, Kigali, Rwanda | Lesotho | 1–0 | 1–1 | 2026 FIFA World Cup qualification |
| 3 | 27 March 2026 | Amahoro Stadium, Kigali, Rwanda | Grenada | 2–0 | 4–0 | 2026 FIFA Series |
| 4 | 13 November 2026 | 26 March Stadium, Bamako, Mali | Mali | 1–0 | 2–3 | 2027 Africa Cup of Nations qualification |

Rwanda

- FIFA Series: 2026
