= Centreville Bank =

Bank

- Type: Mutual
- Industry: Banking
- Founded: June 1828; 198 years ago
- Headquarters: 1218 Main Street, West Warwick, Rhode Island, United States
- Key people: Harold Horvat, President & CEO; Jillian J. DeShiro, CFO/COO
- Total assets: $3.15 billion (June 30, 2026)
- Total equity: $0.431 billion (June 30, 2026)
- Number of employees: 291 (2026)
- Website: www.centrevillebank.com

Centreville Bank is a state chartered bank based in West Warwick, Rhode Island. It operates 12 branches in the Rhode Island cities of Coventry, Cranston, East Greenwich, Narragansett, Newport, North Kingstown, Pawtucket, Smithfield, West Greenwich, Warren, Warwick and West Warwick, as well as a Loan Production Office in Providence. After the acquisition of Putnam Bank in 2020, Centreville added 8 more branches in the Connecticut cities of Danielson, Plainfield, Griswold, Putnam, Pomfret, Norwich, and Gales Ferry (Ledyard).

== History ==
In 1828, Centreville Bank was granted a state charter. Its branch was at the corner of Water and Main Streets in the Centreville part of what was originally western Warwick. The bank was founded by local business and civic leaders, textile manufacturer John Greene and surgeon Sylvester Knight.

In 1865, the bank became a national bank, Centreville National Bank.

In 1888, Centreville Savings Bank was founded.

On April 25, 1901, the bank moved to the Jericho section of Warwick (now known as Arctic). (The Town of West Warwick was later established in 1913.)

In 1928, the architectural firm of Hutchins and French of Boston was commissioned to design a new headquarters building for the bank on Main Street in West Warwick, which the bank still occupies today.

In 1993, with additional branches now in other local communities, Centreville National Bank and Centreville Savings Bank officially merged to become one entity, simply known as Centreville Savings Bank.

In 2016, the bank was renamed Centreville Bank.

In 2020, Centreville Bank acquired Putnam Bank headquartered in northeast Connecticut. The acquisition added 8 branch locations in eastern Connecticut to the Centreville bank footprint.
