= Grant Stoneman =

American soccer player (born 1995)

Personal information
- Date of birth: November 27, 1995 (age 30)
- Place of birth: St. Charles, Illinois, U.S.
- Height: 1.85 m (6 ft 1 in)
- Position: Defender

Team information
- Current team: Rhode Island FC
- Number: 5

College career
Years	Team	Apps	(Gls)
2014–2015	Wisconsin Badgers	15	(0)
2016–2018	Loyola Ramblers	53	(7)

Senior career*
Years	Team	Apps	(Gls)
2016	Lansing United	11	(2)
2017	Michigan Bucks	1	(0)
2017–2018	Chicago FC United	18	(1)
2019	Lansing Ignite	23	(1)
2020–2023	San Diego Loyal	101	(4)
2024–	Rhode Island FC	69	(2)
- * Club domestic league appearances and goals as of November 7, 2026

Grant Stoneman (born November 27, 1995) is an American soccer player who plays as a defender for USL Championship club Rhode Island FC.

Stoneman signed for Rhode Island FC ahead of their inaugural USL Championship season on November 8, 2023.
