= Koke Vegas =

Spanish footballer (born 1995)

Personal information
- Full name: Jorge Ruiz Ojeda
- Date of birth: 27 September 1995 (age 31)
- Place of birth: Antequera, Spain
- Height: 1.88 m (6 ft 2 in)
- Position: Goalkeeper

Team information
- Current team: Rhode Island FC
- Number: 1

Youth career
- Antequera
- Málaga
- Sevilla
- Puerto Malagueño
- Antequera
- 2011–2013: Espanyol

Senior career*
Years	Team	Apps	(Gls)
2011	Antequera	2	(0)
2013–2015	Espanyol B	19	(0)
2015–2017	Levante B	42	(0)
2016–2021	Levante	6	(0)
2017–2018	→ Alcoyano (loan)	9	(0)
2019–2020	→ Deportivo La Coruña (loan)	0	(0)
2021	→ Mallorca (loan)	1	(0)
2022–2023	San Diego Loyal	88	(0)
2024–	Rhode Island FC	75	(0)
- * Club domestic league appearances and goals as of November 7, 2026

Jorge Ruiz Ojeda (born 27 September 1995), known as Koke Vegas or simply Koke, is a Spanish footballer who plays as a goalkeeper for USL Championship club Rhode Island FC.

== Club career ==
Koke was born in Antequera, Málaga, Andalusia, and represented the clubs Antequera, Málaga, Sevilla and CD Puerto Malagueño as a youth. On 16 April 2011, he made his senior debut for the former, coming on as a late substitute in a 0–0 Tercera División home draw against CD Huétor Tájar at the age of just 15.

In 2011, after having trials at Villarreal and Aston Villa, Koke joined Espanyol and returned to youth football. He was promoted to the reserves in 2013, in the Segunda División B.

On 2 July 2015 Koke signed for another reserve team, Levante UD B also in the third tier. He made his professional debut on 4 September 2016, starting in a 1–1 away draw against Gimnàstic de Tarragona in the Segunda División.

On 30 August 2017, Koke was loaned to third-tier club Alcoyano for a year. The following 16 January, his loan was cut short and he was definitely included in the first team.

Koke made his La Liga debut on 19 May 2018, keeping a clean sheet in a 2–4 away loss against Celta de Vigo. On 16 July 2019, after spending the campaign as a third-choice behind Oier Olazábal and Aitor Fernández, he was loaned to second division club Deportivo La Coruña for a year.

On 31 January 2020, as Oier left for Espanyol, Koke was recalled by Levante. He was initially a backup to Fernández, but was overtaken by fellow youth graduate Dani Cárdenas during the 2020–21 campaign.

On 1 February 2021, Koke moved to second division side RCD Mallorca on loan for the remainder of the season. On 31 August, he terminated his deal with the Granotes.

On 7 January 2022, Koke moved to second division US side San Diego Loyal, who competed in the USL Championship.

On 1 November 2023, Koke became the first signing in USL Championship expansion club Rhode Island FC’s history. He was named the team's first captain on March 12, 2024, several days prior to the team's first game.

== Career statistics ==
=== Club ===
As of match played 23 November 2024

Appearances and goals by club, season and competition
Club	Season	League			National Cup		Other		Total	
Club	Season	Division	Apps	Goals	Apps	Goals	Apps	Goals	Apps	Goals
Antequera	2010–11	Tercera División	2	0	—		—		2	0
Espanyol B	2013–14	Segunda División B	3	0	—		—		3	0
Espanyol B	2014–15	Segunda División B	16	0	—		—		16	0
Espanyol B	Total		19	0	0	0	0	0	19	0
Levante B	2015–16	Segunda División B	33	0	—		—		33	0
Levante B	2016–17	Segunda División B	9	0	—		0	0	9	0
Levante B	Total		42	0	0	0	0	0	42	0
Levante	2016–17	Segunda División	1	0	0	0	—		1	0
Levante	2017–18	La Liga	1	0	0	0	—		1	0
Levante	2018–19	La Liga	1	0	0	0	—		1	0
Levante	2019–20	La Liga	2	0	0	0	—		2	0
Levante	2020–21	La Liga	1	0	1	0	—		2	0
Levante	2021–22	La Liga	0	0	0	0	—		0	0
Levante	Total		6	0	1	0	0	0	7	0
Alcoyano (loan)	2017–18	Segunda División B	9	0	0	0	—		9	0
Deportivo La Coruña (loan)	2019–20	Segunda División	0	0	2	0	—		2	0
Mallorca (loan)	2020–21	Segunda División	1	0	0	0	—		1	0
San Diego Loyal	2022	USL Championship	30	0	1	0	—		31	0
San Diego Loyal	2023	USL Championship	31	0	1	0	—		32	0
San Diego Loyal	Total		61	0	2	0	0	0	63	0
Rhode Island FC	2024	USL Championship	24	0	0	0	—		24	0
Career total			164	0	5	0	0	0	169	0
