= Zachary Herivaux =

Haitian footballer (born 1996)

Zachary Herivaux エリボ・ザクリー
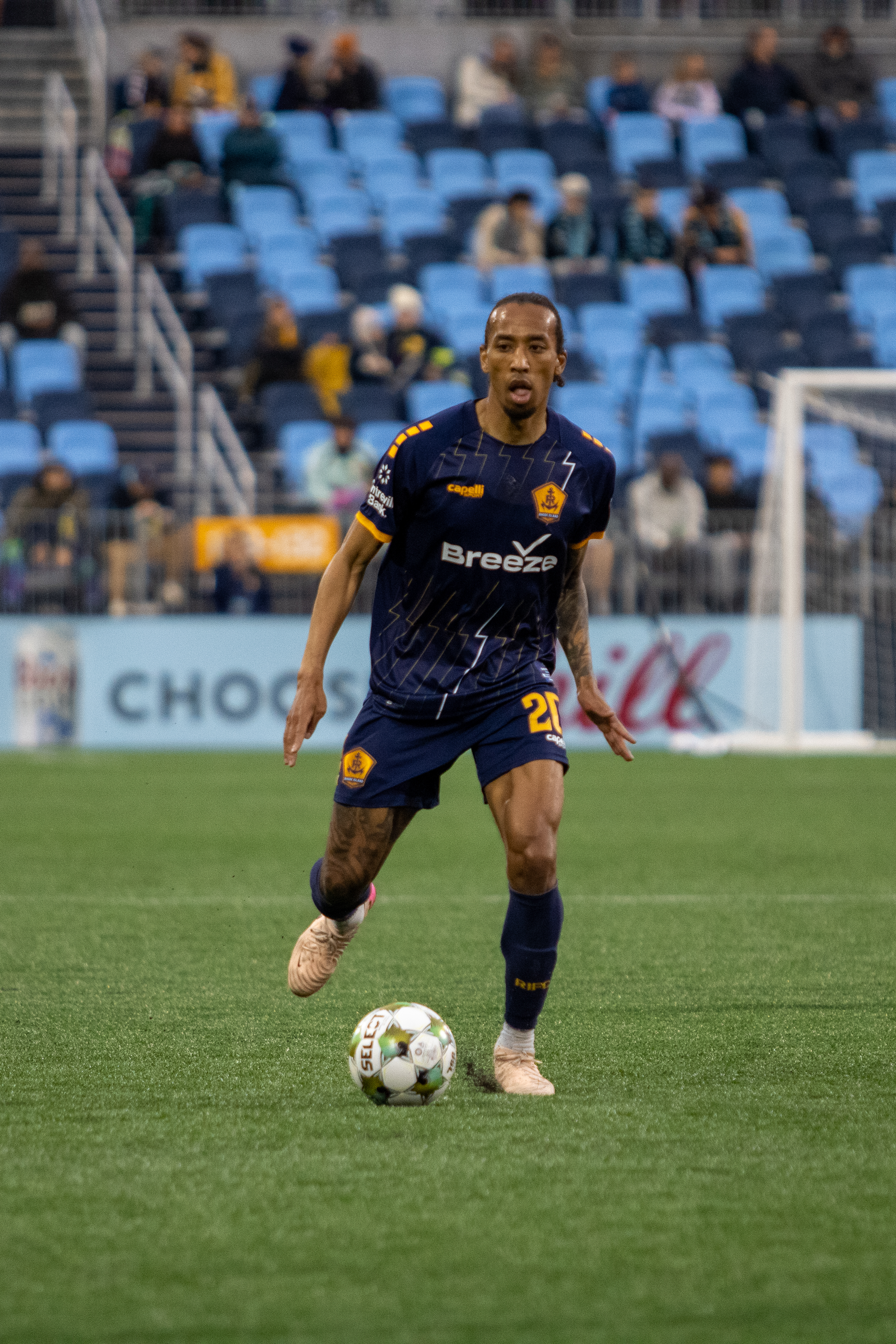
- Herivaux playing for Rhode Island FC during the 2025 USL Championship season

Personal information
- Full name: Zachary Herivaux
- Date of birth: February 1, 1996 (age 30)
- Place of birth: Suita, Osaka, Japan
- Height: 1.86 m (6 ft 1 in)
- Position: Midfielder

Team information
- Current team: Rhode Island FC
- Number: 20

Youth career
- 2011–2015: New England Revolution

Senior career*
Years	Team	Apps	(Gls)
2015–2019	New England Revolution	10	(0)
2017	→ San Antonio FC (loan)	5	(1)
2019	→ Birmingham Legion (loan)	21	(0)
2020	San Antonio FC	8	(0)
2021–2022	Birmingham Legion	54	(2)
2023–2024	Tampa Bay Rowdies	9	(1)
2024–	Rhode Island FC	53	(6)

International career^{‡}
2014–2015	Haiti U20	8	(0)
2015	Haiti U23	3	(0)
2017–	Haiti	19	(0)
- * Club domestic league appearances and goals as of 8 November 2026 ‡ National team caps and goals as of 6 July 2021

Zachary Herivaux (エリボ・ザクリー, Eribo Zakurī; born February 1, 1996) is a professional footballer who plays as a midfielder for USL Championship club Rhode Island FC. Born in Japan, he plays for the Haiti national team.

== Career ==
=== New England Revolution ===
Herivaux attended Beaver Country Day School in Chestnut Hill, Massachusetts. He joined the New England Revolution youth team in 2011 before signing as a Homegrown Player on 2 May 2015.

He made his professional debut as an 87th-minute substitute in a 2–0 loss against Charlotte Independence in a U.S. Open Cup fixture on 17 June 2015.

On 15 March 2019, Herivaux was loaned to USL Championship side Birmingham Legion FC. The loan is open-ended and allows the Revolution to recall Herivaux at any time.

Herivaux was released by New England at the end of their 2019 season.

=== San Antonio FC ===
On 24 January 2020, Herivaux signed with USL Championship side San Antonio FC.

=== Birmingham Legion ===
On 31 March 2021, Herivaux signed with Birmingham Legion.

=== Tampa Bay Rowdies ===
Herivaux was announced as a new signing for USL Championship side Tampa Bay Rowdies ahead of their 2023 season on 8 December 2022. He played in 10 matches across all competitions for the Rowdies, though his 2023 season was curtailed early on by a hamstring injury.

=== Rhode Island FC ===
Herivaux was transferred to Rhode Island on July 3, 2024.

== International career ==
Before playing for Haiti, Herivaux was also eligible to represent Japan and the United States. His father, Pedro, is a Haitian former footballer. He represented Haiti U20's at the 2015 CONCACAF U-20 Championship.

Herivaux's debut for the senior Haiti national team came in a 3–3 2017 Kirin Challenge Cup tie with Japan on 10 October 2017.

On 29 May 2018, Herivaux was called up to the senior national team in an international friendly 0–4 loss against Argentina. "There was so much light, so much blue and white and the fans shouting 'Messi!' It stays loud the whole time," Herivaux said in a post-game interview. He also added: "It's such an opportunity. I soaked it all in."

In May 2019, he was named to Haiti's 40-man provisional squad for the 2019 CONCACAF Gold Cup.

== Personal life ==
Herivaux is a citizen of the United States, Japan, and Haiti. His cousins are Joshua Herivaux, Gabriel Herivaux, Naomi Osaka and Mari Osaka.
