= Noah Fuson =

American soccer player (born 1999)

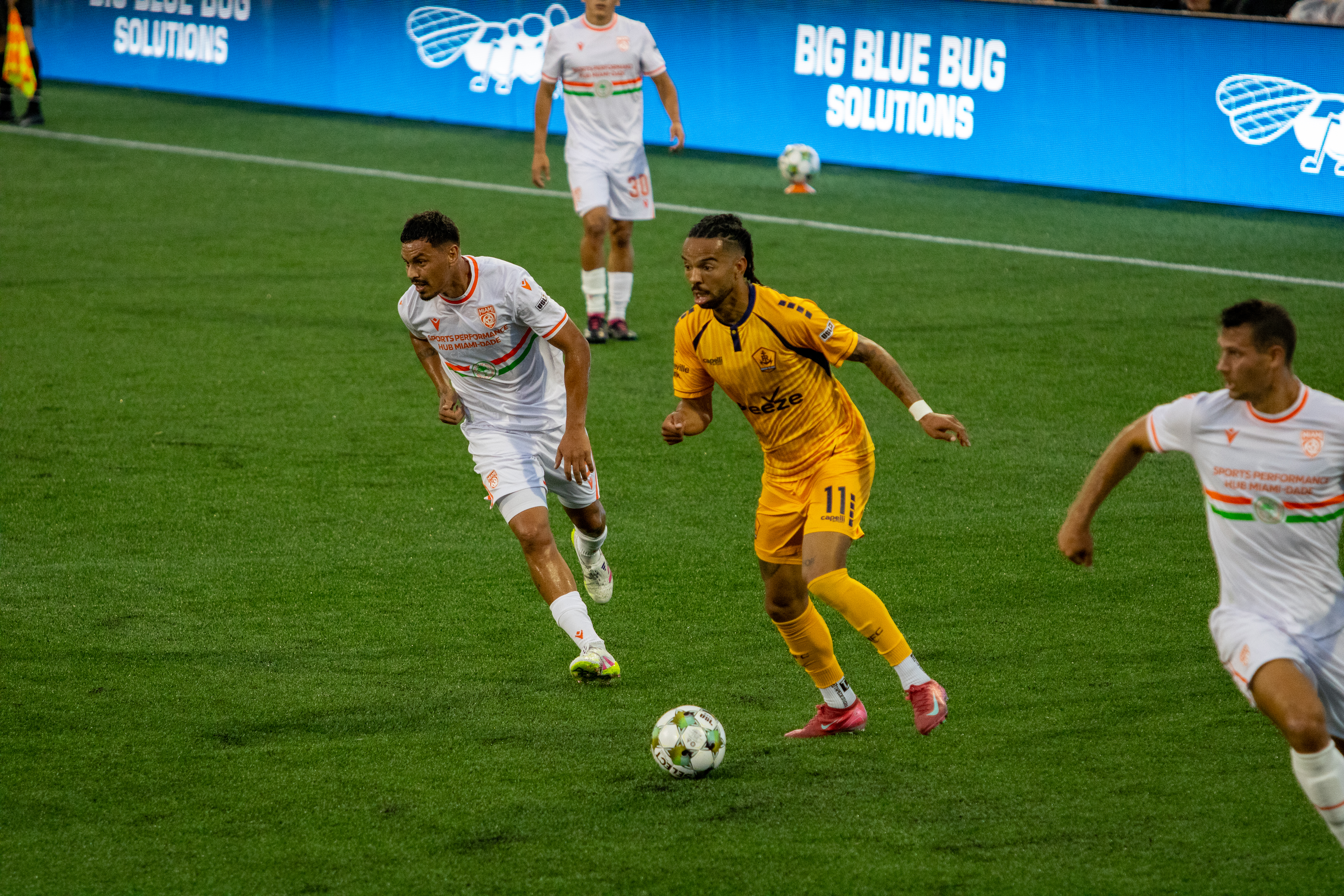
- #11 Fuson playing with Rhode Island FC during the 2026 season

Personal information
- Full name: Noah Fuson
- Date of birth: December 31, 1999 (age 26)
- Place of birth: Los Angeles, California, United States
- Height: 6 ft 3 in (1.91 m)
- Position: Forward

Team information
- Current team: Rhode Island FC
- Number: 11

Youth career
- 2018–2020: i2i Academy
- Tadcaster Albion A.F.C U-21

Senior career*
Years	Team	Apps	(Gls)
2020–2021	Forward Madison	33	(3)
2022–2023	Columbus Crew 2	50	(17)
2022–2023	Columbus Crew	0	(0)
2024–	Rhode Island FC	77	(12)
- * Club domestic league appearances and goals as of November 7, 2026

Noah Fuson (born December 31, 1999) is an American professional soccer player who plays as a forward for USL Championship club Rhode Island FC.

== Career ==
=== Youth ===
After attending Herbert Hoover High School in Glendale, California, Fuson moved from California to the i2i Academy in England in 2018. From 2018 to 2020, he played for i2i and for Tadcaster Albion A.F.C.'s under-21 team.

=== Professional ===
On August 17, 2020, Fuson signed with USL League One club Forward Madison FC. He made his professional debut on August 19, 2020, appearing as a 71st-minute substitute during a 1–1 draw with Union Omaha. Fuson played 33 games and scored three goals for the Flamingos over a season and a half.

On February 18, 2022, Fuson joined Columbus Crew 2, the reserve side of Major League Soccer's Columbus Crew, ahead of their inaugural MLS Next Pro season. In April 2023, Fuson made a short-term move to the Columbus Crew MLS roster.

Fuson signed with USL Championship expansion club Rhode Island FC on January 16, 2024. In his first season with the team, he was third on the team in total goals scored with eight in the regular season (second overall) and one goal in the playoffs. Fuson won the 2024 USL Championship Golden Playmaker award, leading the league with ten regular-season assists. Fuson was named to the USL Championship All-League Second Team, with 18 total goal contributions placing fourth in the league.

Fuson signed a multi-year extension with his club in January 2025.

== Honors ==
Columbus Crew 2

- MLS Next Pro: 2022

USL Championship

- 2024 Golden Playmaker Award - Most League Assists
