= Rhode Island FC =

American professional soccer club based in Pawtucket

- Full name: Rhode Island Football Club
- Nickname: RIFC
- Founded: December 2, 2019; 6 years ago
- Stadium: Centreville Bank Stadium; Pawtucket, Rhode Island
- Capacity: 10,500
- Owners: Brett M. Johnson; Michael Parkhurst
- Head coach: Khano Smith
- League: USL Championship
- 2026: 7th, Eastern Conference; Playoffs: Conference Quarterfinal
- Website: rhodeislandfc.com
Home colors	Away colors

Rhode Island FC is an American professional soccer club headquartered in the Providence metropolitan area. Founded in 2019 and beginning play in 2024, the team plays in the Eastern Conference of the USL Championship, the second tier of the American soccer system. In its first season, Rhode Island won the USL Championship Eastern Conference final, but were runners-up in the USL Championship final, losing 3-0 to Colorado Springs Switchbacks.

== History ==
=== Founding and inaugural season (2019-present) ===
On December 2, 2019, under the leadership of Brett M. Johnson, the co-founder and owner of Rhode Island FC, it was announced that a USL Championship team playing in a new soccer-specific stadium in Pawtucket, Rhode Island would be a centerpiece for a large development project to be named Tidewater Landing. The stadium was proposed to seat at least 10,000 fans and be connected to shops, apartments, offices, and a hotel in a $400-million plan. The project's initial goal was to have the team playing by 2022.

In order to move forward with the project, team ownership requested partial funding from the State of Rhode Island and City of Pawtucket, with the remainder covered by team ownership. Plans moved slowly due to inflation and supply-chain delays caused by COVID-19, and costs increased from initial projections. Rhode Island's Governor, Dan McKee, cast the deciding vote in a Rhode Island Commerce Corporation meeting on July 25, 2022, to provide funding and allow construction of the stadium. Groundbreaking occurred on August 12, 2022.

The day after the team name was announced, RIFC allowed fans to place advance deposits for purchase of season tickets, which could be applied for a later purchase. The team reported success with the deposits with more than 2,500 in the first week, exceeding volume from any previous USL franchise at their debut. By December, the team reported receiving season ticket deposits from customers in each of Rhode Island's 39 cities and towns.

Former Bermuda national team captain Khano Smith was named the team's first head coach and general manager on March 8, 2023. This signing was followed up on November 1, with the announcing of the signing of the first player in team history, Spanish goalkeeper Koke Vegas, a former player for San Diego Loyal and many years at various clubs in Spain. He was subsequently named the team's first captain on March 12, 2024, several days prior to the team's first game.

The team's inaugural match was a sellout on March 16, 2024, against New Mexico United, ending in a 1–1 tie. The first goal in team history was an own goal scored in second-half stoppage time by New Mexico defender Chris Gloster. It was the first time in USL Championship history that a team earned a point in its inaugural game.

The team finished the 2024 regular season 5th in the Eastern Conference of the USL Championship. The team showed significant improvement in the standings as the season went on, having been in 11th place as late as mid-June.

Significant inaugural season milestones included their first win at the Las Vegas Lights in April, the only regular season defeat of the Louisville City FC at their home stadium, and a 3-0 victory against rivals Hartford Athletic. The team had a mid-season unbeaten streak of 8 games and closed the regular season on a 6-game unbeaten streak, extending it further in the playoffs. Their final game against Miami FC was an 8–1 victory, the largest margin of victory and highest single-game goal total of any game in the 2024 season.

Rhode Island FC set the single-season USL Championship record for most draws, at 15. Team honors included Noah Fuson as the 2024 Golden Playmaker, JJ Williams as Player of the Month of October, and Khano Smith as Coach of the Month for June.

After defeating Indy 3–2 in their first playoff game, RIFC traveled to Players' Shield winners Louisville City FC, beating them 3–0. In the Eastern Conference Championship, they beat Charleston Battery 2–1. RIFC lost in the 2024 USL Championship Final 3-0 to the Colorado Springs Switchbacks.

In 2025, the team moved to its new home location, Centreville Bank Stadium. The team's first scheduled game at Centreville was a 10,700-person sellout May 3, as Rhode Island played a 0–0 draw against San Antonio FC. Season highlights included the team's first meeting against the New England Revolution, a 2–1 home loss in the U.S. Open Cup; scoring a 5–0 home victory against the Tampa Bay Rowdies; and winning Group 4 and reaching the semifinals of the USL Cup. As the seventh-seed in the playoffs, RIFC won two playoff games, but lost to Pittsburgh Riverhounds SC in the USL Eastern Conference Final.

== Stadium ==
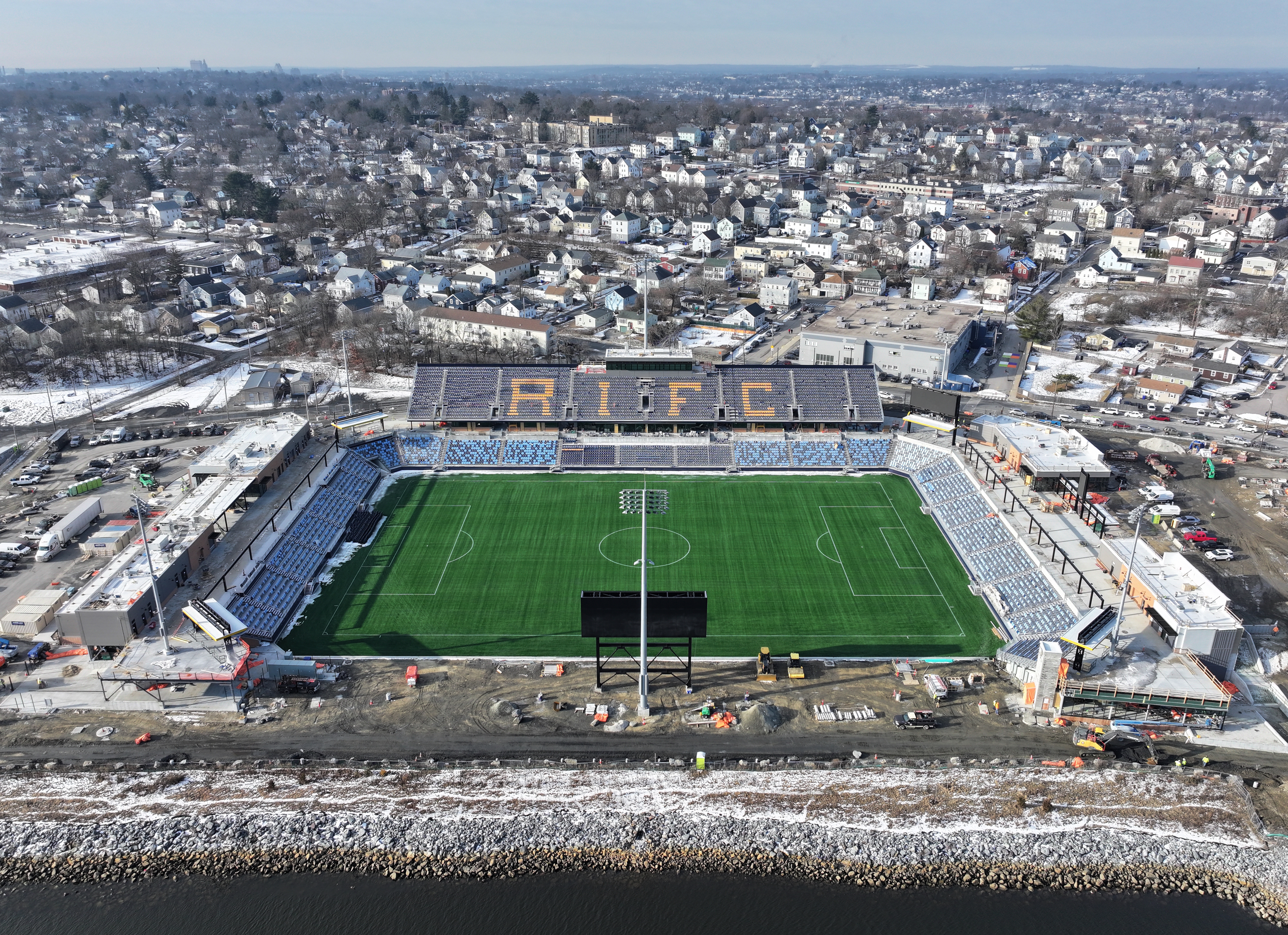
Centreville Bank Stadium under construction

The club was slated to originally play their inaugural match at their own stadium, but after construction stalled out due to an increase in additional construction costs, the team announced that it would make plans to play its first season at Bryant University's Beirne Stadium while completing construction of the 10,500-capacity stadium at Tidewater Landing.

Additional funding was obtained by the owners from unnamed investors for the stadium, and full financial support for construction was announced on August 9, 2023, and bonds were issued in early 2024 to complete the financing. The total construction cost of the stadium is estimated at $130 million.

Naming rights for the stadium were awarded on April 8, 2025, to Centreville Bank, and the May 3, 2025 opener against San Antonio FC was a sellout with digntaries in attendance. The first goal in stadium history was scored by Tomás Chancalay of the New England Revolution, and RIFC’s first goal was scored by Maxi Rodriguez, both on May 7, 2025. Rhode Island's first victory at the venue was June 14, 2025 against North Carolina FC. The current attendance record is 10,749, set on July 5, 2025.

== Colors and badge ==
On November 14, 2022, the team announced their name as Rhode Island FC (RIFC) and revealed their team crest and colors. The crest incorporated an anchor design, with a monogram of "RI" embedded in the anchor stem. Lightning bolts were placed at the edges of the anchor to represent the team's energy. The team noted that the anchor has been historically a symbol of Rhode Island since 1647, and the modern design in the crest gives evidence of "hope" and being "grounded in the community". Team colors were established as amber and bay blue.

=== Kit history ===
Home and away kits.

- Home

2024–25	2026–

- Away

2024–25	2026–

- Third

2025

== Club culture ==
=== Supporter groups ===
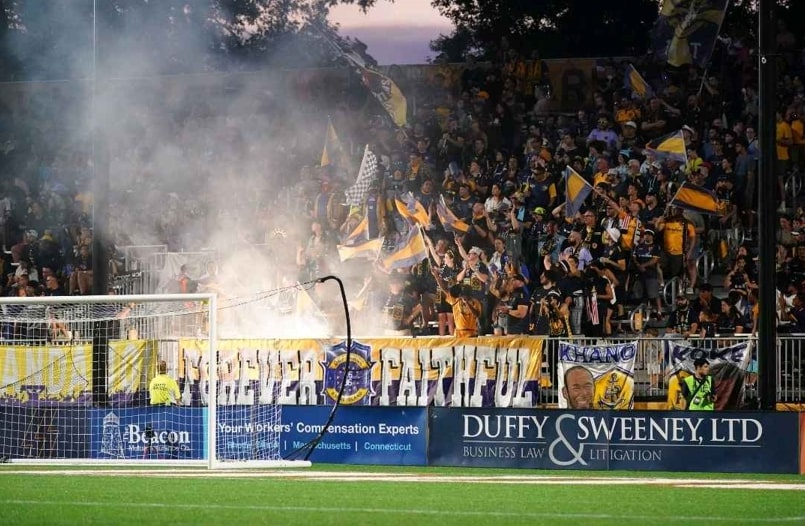
Defiance 1636 light up pyro in the stands.

The club has one official supporter group, an independent supporter group called Rhode Island Defiance 1636. The name is in reference to the date of the founding of the colony of Rhode Island, and the defiance against the doubt of successful professional soccer in Rhode Island. The supporter group also goes by the nickname of "La Barra Bahía." During home matches at Beirne Stadium, they were typically situated behind the north endline. Centreville Bank Stadium created a dedicated safe-standing supporters' area for the group in section 116 with seating in both 115 and 117. The group is well-regarded for their atypically strong support during away matches and for being ruthless during home matches using the style of Barra Brava.

=== Mascot ===
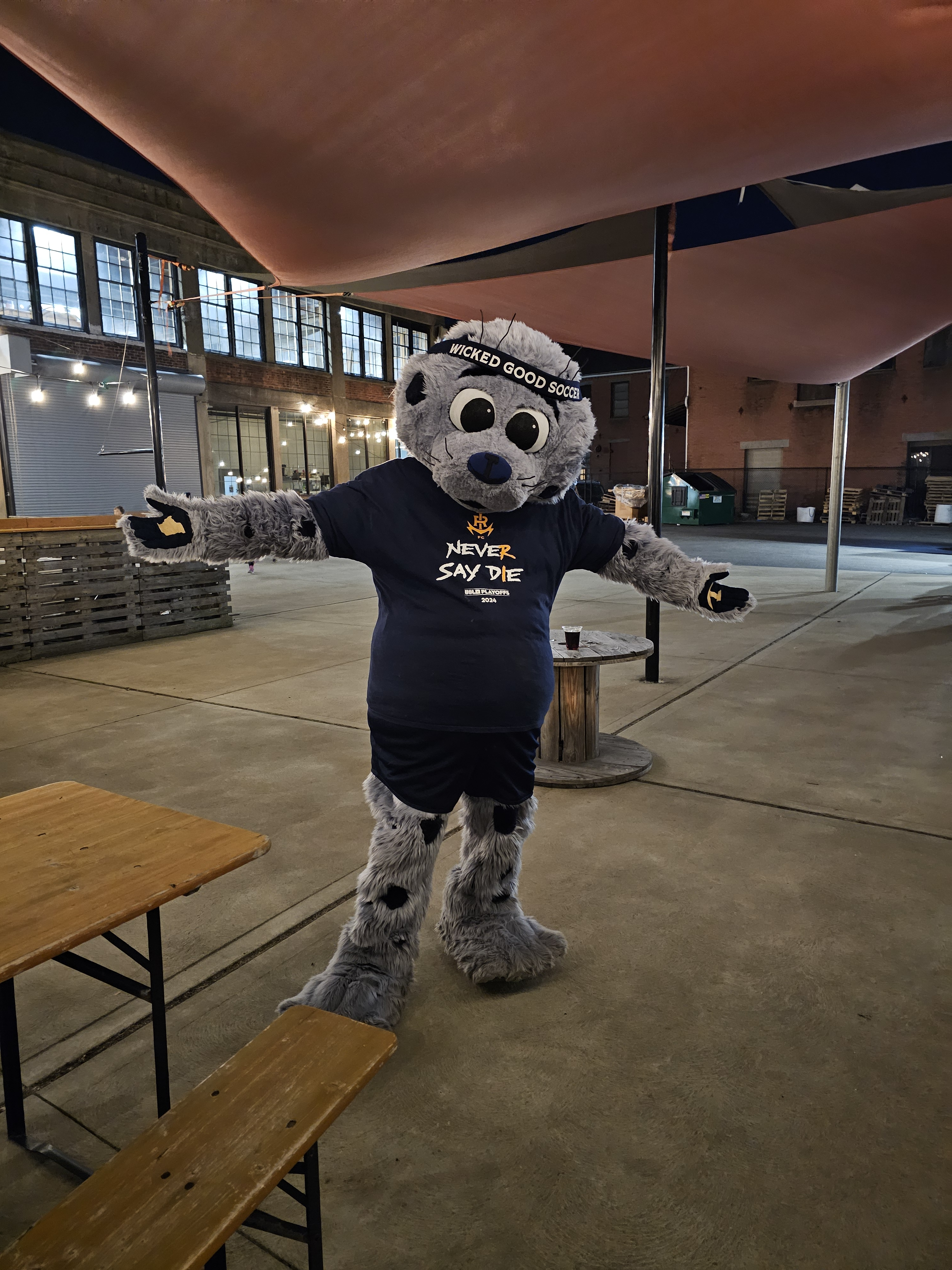
Chip wearing "Never say die" slogan shirt

Chip, RIFC's mascot, was introduced on November 9, 2023. Chip is an anthropomorphic harbor seal, who loves football and roots for RIFC as his favorite team. The harbor seal is the official marine mammal of the state of Rhode Island. Symbolic of his Rhode Island roots, the team described Chip as having thirteen whiskers (Rhode Island being the thirteenth state), spots on his fur that look like the team crest, and a marking on his nose that looks like an anchor. He wears a headband that reads "wicked good soccer", the word "wicked" as an intensifier being typical to the New England dialect of English. He also enjoys eating fish and chips, quahogs, and hot wieners.

== Kit manufacturer and sponsorship ==
Season	Kit manufacturer	Shirt sponsor	Sleeve sponsor
2024–	Capelli Sport	Front: Breeze Airways; Back: Rhode Island Energy	Centreville Bank

== Players and staff ==
=== Current roster ===
As of September 17, 2026

Note: Flags indicate national team as defined under FIFA eligibility rules; some limited exceptions apply. Players may hold more than one non-FIFA nationality.

No.	Pos.	Nation	Player
1	GK	ESP	Koke Vegas
2	DF	COL	Dani Rovira
3	DF	USA	Aldair Sanchez
4	DF	ESP	Hugo Bacharach
5	DF	USA	Grant Stoneman
7	MF	JAM	Dwayne Atkinson
8	FW	BRA	Leo Afonso
10	MF	ARG	Agustín Rodríguez (on loan from Lanús)
11	FW	USA	Noah Fuson
13	GK	USA	Will Meyer
14	FW	JPN	Yutaro Tsukada (on loan from Orlando City)
15	DF	CUB	Frank Nodarse
16	MF	USA	Eric Klein (on loan from New England Revolution)
17	MF	RWA	Jojea Kwizera

No.	Pos.	Nation	Player
18	FW	NED	Osman Foyo
19	MF	USA	Kevin Vang
20	FW	USA	Jamin Gogo Peters
21	MF	HAI	Zachary Herivaux
22	DF	USA	Nick Scardina
24	DF	CAN	Karifa Yao
25	DF	USA	CJ Williams
27	DF	HAI	Nikolai Pierre
28	FW	JAM	Cai McLean
29	GK	USA	Jacob Castro
30	MF	USA	Kevin Medina
37	FW	USA	Stas Korzeniowski (on loan from Philadelphia Union)
77	MF	USA	Amos Shapiro-Thompson

=== Out on loan ===
Note: Flags indicate national team as defined under FIFA eligibility rules; some limited exceptions apply. Players may hold more than one non-FIFA nationality.

No.	Pos.	Nation	Player
12	MF	USA	Clay Holstad (on loan to FC Dallas)

=== Staff ===
As of October 26, 2026

Front Office
President	(United States) Lou DiPaoli
General Manager	(Bermuda) Khano Smith
VP of Football Affairs	(United States) Sean Carey
Stadium General Manager	(United States) Paul Byrne
Chief Revenue Officer	(United States) Brendan Hankard
Technical Staff
Head Coach	(Bermuda) Khano Smith
Assistant Coach	(Republic of Ireland) Dave McKay
Assistant Coach	(United States) Marcos Ugarte
Assistant Coach / Director of Goalkeeping	(England) Karl Spratt
Director of Soccer Operations	(United States) Jason Gove
Head of Video Analysis	(Mexico) Gustavo Rodriguez
Head Athletic Trainer	(United States) Langston Smith
Head Kit Manager	(United States) Parker Sackett

=== Club captains ===
Years	Name	Nation
2024–present	Koke Vegas	Spain

== Team records ==
=== Year-by-year ===
As of October 30, 2026

Season	Record											Position		Playoffs	USOC	USL Cup	Continental	Average attendance	Top goalscorer(s)	
Season	Div	League	Pld	W	L	D	GF	GA	GD	Pts	PPG	Conf.	Overall	Playoffs	USOC	USL Cup	Continental	Average attendance	Name	Goals
2024	2	USLC	34	12	7	15	56	41	+15	51	1.50	5th	7th	RU	R3	N/A	DNQ	4,347	(Cameroon) Albert Dikwa (United States) JJ Williams	11
2025	2	USLC	30	10	12	8	29	28	+1	38	1.27	7th	14th	SF	R 32	1st, Group 4 SF	DNQ	8,914	(Cameroon) Albert Dikwa (United States) JJ Williams	8
2026	2	USLC	30	12	12	6	42	33	+9	42	1.40	7th	14th	R1	R 32	2nd, Group 5	DNQ	8,096	(United States) JJ Williams	11

1. Avg. attendance include statistics from league matches only.
2. Top goalscorer(s) includes all goals scored in league, league playoffs, U.S. Open Cup, CONCACAF Champions League, FIFA Club World Cup, and other competitive continental matches.

=== Head coaches ===
- Includes USL Regular Season, USL Playoffs, U.S. Open Cup, USL Cup. Excludes friendlies. Games ending in shootouts are counted as draws. Updated through October 30, 2026.

Coach	Nationality	Start	End	Games	Win	Loss	Draw	Win %
Khano Smith	Bermuda	March 8, 2023	present	118	46	35	37	38.98

== Honors ==
- USL Championship
  - Runners-up: 2024
- USL Championship Eastern Conference
  - Champions (Playoffs): 2024
