= 2024 Pittsburgh Riverhounds SC season =

Pittsburgh Riverhounds SC
2024 season
- The anniversary crest for the club's 25th season.
- Owner: Tuffy Shallenberger
- Head coach: Bob Lilley
- USL Championship: Conference: 7th Overall: 12th
- U.S. Open Cup: Round of 32

The 2024 Pittsburgh Riverhounds SC season was the club's twenty-fifth season of existence, their eighth season in the second tier of American soccer, and their fourteenth season in the league now named the USL Championship (USLC).

Bob Lilley returns for his seventh season as Riverhounds manager.

== Roster ==
As of January 28, 2024

No.	Name	Nationality	Position(s)	Date of birth (age)	Signed in	Previous club	Apps	Goals
Goalkeepers
1	Eric Dick	(United States)	GK	October 3, 1994 (age 31)	2024	(United States) Minnesota United	0	0
12	Gabriel Perrotta	(Paraguay)	GK	December 26, 1998 (age 27)	2024	(United States) Marshall Thundering Herd	0	0
31	Jacob Randolph	(United States)	GK	April 9, 2001 (age 25)	2024	(United States) UNC Wilmington Seahawks	0	0
Defenders
3	Patrick Hogan	(United States)	DF	September 17, 1997 (age 28)	2023	(United States) Charleston Battery	28	0
4	Dani Rovira	(Colombia)	DF	December 15, 1996 (age 29)	2019	(United States) Vermont Catamounts	110	1
5	Sean Suber	(United States)	DF	June 13, 2001 (age 25)	2024	(United States) Huntsville City FC	0	0
13	Luke Biasi	(United States)	DF	July 15, 1997 (age 29)	2022	(United States) Syracuse Orange	48	0
22	Jake Lent-Koop	(United States)	DF	November 22, 2000 (age 25)	2024	(United States) Messiah Falcons	0	0
23	Michael DeShields	(Trinidad and Tobago)	DF	April 23, 1998 (age 28)	2023	(United States) New England Revolution II	14	0
28	Illal Osumanu	(Ghana)	DF	August 20, 1996 (age 29)	2022	(United States) Union Omaha	10	1
44	Pierre Cayet	(France)	DF	July 7, 1999 (age 27)	2024	(United States) New England Revolution II	0	0
Midfielders
2	Danny Griffin	(United States)	MF	July 14, 1998 (age 28)	2023	(United States) Huntsville City FC	116	8
8	Junior Etou	(Republic of the Congo)	MF	June 1, 1994 (age 32)	2023	(United States) Tampa Bay Rowdies	31	1
10	Aidan O’Toole	(United States)	MF	June 7, 2001 (age 25)	2024	(United States) Denver Pioneers	0	0
11	Kenardo Forbes	(Jamaica)	MF	May 15, 1988 (age 38)	2018	(United States) Rochester Rhinos	191	19
14	Robbie Mertz	(United States)	MF	December 4, 1996 (age 29)	2022	(United States) Atlanta United 2	99	15
15	Bradley Sample	(United States)	MF	November 12, 2000 (age 25)	2024	(United States) Louisville Cardinals	0	0
17	Nate Dragisich	(United States)	MF	March 31, 2001 (age 25)	2024	(United States) Duquesne Dukes (Note: Before attending college at Duquesne, Nate Dragisich was a graduate of the Riverhounds Academy)	0	0
42	Jackson Wälti	(United States)	MF	December 7, 1999 (age 26)	2024	(United States) Colorado Rapids 2	0	0
70	Pablo Linzoain	(United States)	MF		2024	(United States) Riverhounds Academy	0	0
Forwards
7	Langston Blackstock	(United States)	FW	March 23, 2000 (age 26)	2023	(United States) Clayton State Lakers	45	8
9	Emmanuel Johnson	(United States)	FW	May 11, 2003 (age 23)	2024	(Scotland) Hibernian F.C.	0	0
19	Edward Kizza	(Uganda)	FW	December 17, 1998 (age 27)	2022	(United States) New England Revolution	26	0
27	Babacar Diene	(Senegal)	FW	October 25, 1996 (age 29)	2024	(United States) Rider Broncos	0	0
45	Kazaiah Sterling	(England)	FW	November 9, 1998 (age 27)	2024	(United States) Tormenta FC	0	0

== Transfers ==
=== Transfers in ===
Date	Position	No.	Player	From	Fee	Ref.
Winter 2023–24
January 19, 2024	DF	44	(France) Pierre Cayet	(United States) New England Revolution II	Free	
January 19, 2024	DF	5	(United States) Sean Suber	(United States) Huntsville City FC	Free	
January 22, 2024	GK	1	(United States) Eric Dick	(United States) Minnesota United	Free	
January 22, 2024	GK	31	(United States) Jacob Randolph	(United States) UNC Wilmington Seahawks	Free	
January 25, 2024	FW	27	(Senegal) Babacar Diene	(United States) Rider Broncs	Free	
January 25, 2024	DF	22	(United States) Jake Lent-Koop	(United States) Messiah Falcons	Free	
January 26, 2024	MF	15	(United States) Bradley Sample	(United States) Louisville Cardinals	Free	
January 26, 2024	MF	42	(United States) Jackson Wälti	(United States) Colorado Rapids 2	Free	
February 28, 2024	FW	45	(England) Kazaiah Sterling	(United States) Tormenta FC	Free	
March 6, 2024	MF	17	(United States) Nate Dragisich	(United States) Duquesne Dukes (Note: Before attending college at Duquesne, Nate Dragisich was a graduate of the Riverhounds Academy)	Free	
March 7, 2024	GK	12	(Paraguay) Gabriel Perrotta	(United States) Marshall Thundering Herd	Free	
March 7, 2024	MF	10	(United States) Aidan O’Toole	(United States) Denver Pioneers	Free	
March 8, 2024	FW	9	(United States) Emmanuel Johnson	(Scotland) Hibernian F.C.	Free	
May 17, 2024	MF	70	(United States) Pablo Linzoain	(United States) Riverhounds Academy	USL Academy	

=== Transfers out ===
Date	Position	No.	Player	To	Fee	Ref.
Winter 2023–24
November 30, 2023	FW	9	(Cameroon) Albert Dikwa	(United States) Rhode Island FC	Free	—N/a
November 30, 2023	DF	5	(Spain) Arturo Ordoñez	(United States) Louisville City	Free	—N/a
November 30, 2023	DF	15	(United States) Joe Farrell	(United States) Hartford Athletic	Free	—N/a
November 30, 2023	GK	26	(Jamaica) Jahmali Waite	(United States) El Paso Locomotive	Free	—N/a
November 30, 2023	MF	23	(United States) Marc Ybarra	(United States) Rhode Island FC	Free	—N/a
November 30, 2023	FW	24	(United States) Tola Showunmi	(United States) Louisville City	Free	—N/a
January 25, 2024	FW	10	(Liberia) DZ Harmon	Unattached	Mutual Agreement	
June 19, 2024	DF	23	(Trinidad and Tobago) Michael DeShields	(United States) Hartford Athletic	Free	

== Non-competitive ==
February 6 Preseason 1	Pittsburgh Riverhounds SC	0–0	Indy Eleven	Pittsburgh, PA
12:00PM EST		Report		Stadium: Highmark Stadium

February 9 Preseason 2	Loudoun United FC	1–2	Pittsburgh Riverhounds SC	Leesburg, VA
1:00PM EST	ElMedkhar 22'	Report	Mertz 43' (pen.); Diene 56'	Stadium: Segra Field
Note: Closed-door

February 18 Preseason 3	Pittsburgh Riverhounds SC	0–2	West Virginia Mountaineers	Pittsburgh, PA
2:00PM EST		Report	Caldeira 49'; Dekel Daks 79'	Stadium: Highmark Stadium

February 24 Preseason 4	Pittsburgh Riverhounds SC	2–0	Pittsburgh Panthers	Pittsburgh, PA
7:00PM EST	Mertz 51'; Hogan 65'	Report		Stadium: Highmark Stadium

March 2 Preseason 5	Louisville City FC	0–1	Pittsburgh Riverhounds SC	Louisville, KY
1:00PM EST		Report	Diene 54'	Stadium: Thurman Hutchins Park

== Competitive ==
=== Overview ===
Competition	First match	Last match	Starting round	Record							
Competition	First match	Last match	Starting round	Pld	W	D	L	GF	GA	GD	Win %
USL Championship	March 9, 2024		Matchday 1	10	3	4	3	10	10	+0	30.00
U.S. Open Cup	May 7, 2024		Round of 32	1	0	0	1	0	1	−1	0.00
Total				11	3	4	4	10	11	−1	27.27

Last updated: May 5, 2024
Source: Competitions

=== USL Championship ===
==== Eastern Conference standings ====
Pos	Team	Pld	W	L	T	GF	GA	GD	Pts	Qualification
5	Rhode Island FC	34	12	7	15	56	41	+15	51	Playoffs
6	Tampa Bay Rowdies	34	14	12	8	55	46	+9	50	Playoffs
7	Pittsburgh Riverhounds SC	34	12	10	12	41	28	+13	48	Playoffs
8	North Carolina FC	34	13	12	9	54	43	+11	48	Playoffs
9	Birmingham Legion FC	34	13	15	6	44	51	−7	45	

Source: USL Championship Standings
Rules for classification: 1) head-to-head points; 2) head-to-head goal differential; 3) points-per game within conference; 4) total wins; 5) total goal differential; 6) total goals scored; 7) points earned against top four Conference finishers; 8) disciplinary points; 9) coin toss or drawing of lots

==== Results summary ====
Overall								Home						Away					
Pld	Pts	W	L	T	GF	GA	GD	W	L	T	GF	GA	GD	W	L	T	GF	GA	GD
10	13	3	3	4	10	10	0	2	1	2	4	3	+1	1	2	2	6	7	−1

Source: USL Championship
Pld = Matches played; Pts = Points; W = Matches won; T = Matches tied; L = Matches lost; GF = Goals for; GA = Goals against; GD = Goal difference

==== Results by round ====
Round	1	2	3	4	5	6	7	8	9	10	11	12	13	14	15	16	17	18	19	20	21	22	23	24	25	26	27	28	29	30	31	32	33	34
Ground	A	H	A	H	A	A	H	H	A	H	A	H	A	A	H	A	A	H	H	H	H	A	A	H	H	H	A	H	A	H	A	H	A	H
Result	L	L	L	D	D	W	W	W	D	D	L	L	D	L	L	D	L	L	W	W	D	W	D	D	D	W	D	W	L	D	W	W	W	W
Eastern	12	12	12	12	12	10	7	5	7	7																								7
Points	0	0	0	1	2	5	8	11	12	13	13	13	14	14	14	15	15	15	18	21	22	25	26	27	28	31	32	35	35	36	39	42	45	48

Source: Pittsburgh Riverhounds SC schedule USL Championship League Standings
A = Away; H = Home; W = Win; D = Draw; L = Loss
Notes: Position is Eastern Conference position.

==== Match results ====
March 9 1	New Mexico United	1–0	Pittsburgh Riverhounds SC	Albuquerque, NM
4:00PM EST	Bailey (yellow card) 42'; Hurst 44'; Swartz (yellow card) 47'; Hernandez (yellow card) 90'; Harris (yellow card) 90+1'; Micaletto (yellow card) 90+4'	Report	Osumanu (yellow card) 35'; Diene (yellow card) 51'	Stadium: Isotopes Park; Attendance: 11,347; Referee: Ricardo Fierro

March 16 2	Pittsburgh Riverhounds SC	0–2	Orange County SC	Pittsburgh, PA
7:00PM EST	Hogan (yellow card) 71'; Biasi (yellow card) 81'	Report	Iloski 3'; Miles (yellow card) 24'; Doghman (yellow card) 60'; Amang (yellow card) 64'; Dunbar 76'; Shutler (yellow card) 84'	Stadium: Highmark Stadium; Attendance: 5,125; Referee: Matthew Thompson

March 23 3	Louisville City FC	3–1	Pittsburgh Riverhounds SC	Louisville, KY
4:00PM EST	Harris 45+5'; Totsch (yellow card) 54' (goal) 65' (pen.); Wynder (yellow card) 88'; Serrano 90+6'	Report	Mertz (yellow card) 48'; Kizza 59'	Stadium: Lynn Family Stadium; Attendance: 9,313; Referee: Elton García

April 6 4	Pittsburgh Riverhounds SC	0–0	Tampa Bay Rowdies	Pittsburgh, PA
7:00PM EST	Sample (yellow card) 89'	Report	Guillén (yellow card) 17'	Stadium: Highmark Stadium; Attendance: 3,109; Referee: Adam Kilpatrick

April 13 5	Rhode Island FC	0–0	Pittsburgh Riverhounds SC	Smithfield, RI
7:30PM EST	Holstad (yellow card) 50'; Smith (yellow card) 90+8'	Report	Osumanu (yellow card) 62'; Blackstock (yellow card) 68'; Biasi (yellow card) 88'; Diene (yellow card) 90+2'; Johnson (yellow card) 90+4'	Stadium: Beirne Stadium; Attendance: 3,678; Referee: Olvin Oliva

April 20 6	Phoenix Rising FC	1–3	Pittsburgh Riverhounds SC	Phoenix, AZ
10:30PM EST	Stenberg (yellow card) 24'; Cabral 28'; Gallardo (yellow card) 42'; Boye (yellow card) 47'	Report	Osumanu (yellow card) 15'; Sterling 26'; Kizza 62'; Diene 90'	Stadium: Phoenix Rising Soccer Stadium; Attendance: 6,759; Referee: Brad Jensen

April 27 7	Pittsburgh Riverhounds SC	2–0	Detroit City FC	Pittsburgh, PA
7:00PM EST	Hogan 20'; Griffin 35' (pen.) (yellow card) 40'; Blackstock (yellow card) 45+1'; Etou (yellow card) 49'; Suber (yellow card) 90'	Report	Amoo-Mensah (yellow card) 33'; Diop (yellow card) 75'; Matthews (yellow card) 86'; Sheldon (yellow card) 90+4'; Carroll (red card) 90+6'	Stadium: Highmark Stadium; Attendance: 6,099; Referee: Kyle Johnston

May 4 8	Pittsburgh Riverhounds SC	1–0	Miami FC	Pittsburgh, PA
7:00PM EST	Sterling 16'	Report	Cardona (yellow card) 32'; Genzano (yellow card) 40'	Stadium: Highmark Stadium; Attendance: 4,172; Referee: Brandon Stevis

May 11 9	FC Tulsa	2–2	Pittsburgh Riverhounds SC	Tulsa, OK
8:30PM EST	Perrotta 12' (o.g.); Stojanovic (yellow card) 22'; Diallo 33'; Portillo (yellow card) 67'; Laszo (yellow card) 74'; Tetteh (yellow card) 87'	Report	Hogan (yellow card) 21'; Kizza (yellow card) 43'; Sample (yellow card) 51'; Griffin 64' (pen.); Perrotta (yellow card) 68'; Sterling 85'	Stadium: Oneok Field; Attendance: 4,486; Referee: Elijio Arreguin

May 18 10	Pittsburgh Riverhounds SC	1–1	North Carolina FC	Pittsburgh, PA
7:00PM EST	Osumanu (yellow card) 6'; Kizza 44'; Etou (yellow card) 67'; Sample (yellow card) 85'	Report	Conway 58'	Stadium: Highmark Stadium; Attendance: 5,113; Referee: Natalie Simon

May 25 11	Memphis 901 FC	2–0	Pittsburgh Riverhounds SC	Memphis, TN
8:30PM EST	Marlon 7'; Cissoko (yellow card) 13'; Jimenez (yellow card) 30' (goal) 47'; Quezada (yellow card) 90+3'	Report	Biasi (yellow card) 61'	Stadium: AutoZone Park; Attendance: 3,020; Referee: Velimir Stefanovic

June 1 12	Pittsburgh Riverhounds SC	1–2	Indy Eleven	Pittsburgh, PA
7:00 PM EST	Griffin 57'; Diene (yellow card) 90+3'	Report	O'Brien 23'; O'Brien (yellow card) 39'; Guenzatti 46'; Stanley (yellow card) 51'; Mines (yellow card) 59'; Collier (yellow card) 90+2'	Stadium: Highmark Stadium; Attendance: 5,002; Referee: Lorenzo Hernandez

June 8 13	Charleston Battery	0–0	Pittsburgh Riverhounds SC	Mount Pleasant, SC
7:30PM EST		Report	Walti (yellow card) 51'; Kizza (yellow card) 75'	Stadium: Patriots Point Soccer Complex; Attendance: 3,626; Referee: Thomas Snyder

June 15 14	Hartford Athletic	2–0	Pittsburgh Riverhounds SC	Hartford, Connecticut
7:00 PM EST	Michee Ngalina 6', 16'; Vancaeyezeele (yellow card) 45+1'; Hodge (yellow card) 65'; Makangila (yellow card) 90+1'	Report	Etou (yellow card) 39'; Osumanu (yellow card) 63'; Hogan (yellow card) 90+4'	Stadium: Trinity Health Stadium; Attendance: 4,747; Referee: Joshua Encarnación

June 19 15	Pittsburgh Riverhounds SC	0–1	Louisville City	Pittsburgh, PA
7:30 PM EST	Luke Biasi (yellow card) 17' (yellow-red card) 76'; Brunallergene Etou (yellow card) 70'	Report	Cruz (yellow card) 45+3'; Ordoñez (yellow card) 45+6'; Wilson 49'; Harris (yellow card) 66'	Stadium: Highmark Stadium; Attendance: 5,084; Referee: Matt Thompson; Assistant referees: Art Arustamyan; Nicholas Seymour; Fourth official: Ali Zolgharnain

June 22 16	North Carolina FC	0–0	Pittsburgh Riverhounds SC	Cary, NC
7:30PM EST	da Costa (yellow card) 32'; Maldonado (yellow card) 44'; Armstrong (yellow card) 44'; Malou (yellow card) 58'	Report	Walti (yellow card) 44'; Griffin (yellow card) 52'; Suber (yellow card) 64'	Stadium: WakeMed Soccer Park; Attendance: 1,996; Referee: Muhammad Hassan

June 29 17	Las Vegas Lights FC	2–0	Pittsburgh Riverhounds SC	Las Vegas, NV
10:30PM EST	Bennett (yellow card) 26' (goal) 40' 87'; Romero (yellow card) 90+1'	Report	Osumanu (yellow card) 14'	Stadium: Cashman Field; Attendance: 1,893; Referee: John Griggs

July 6 19	Pittsburgh Riverhounds SC	0–1	Monterey Bay FC	Pittsburgh, Pennsylvania
7:00 PM EST		Report	Rebollar (yellow card) 38'; Bouda 90+1'	Stadium: Highmark Stadium; Attendance: 5,018; Referee: Joe Surgan

July 13 19	Pittsburgh Riverhounds SC	5–0	Oakland Roots SC	Pittsburgh, PA
7:00PM EST	Etou 12' 69'; Mertz 30' (pen.); Suber (yellow card) 45'; Osumanu (yellow card) 49'; Forbes 51'; Biasi (yellow card) 85'	Report	Tamacas (yellow card) 26'; Blanchette (yellow card) 28'; Nijie (yellow card) 47'	Stadium: Highmark Stadium; Attendance: 4,936; Referee: Nabil Bensalah

July 20 20	Pittsburgh Riverhounds SC	3–1	Hartford Athletic	Pittsburgh, PA
8:00PM EST	Kizza 5' (pen.); Blackstock 20'; Johnson 21'; Osumanu (yellow card) 46'	Report	Beckford (yellow card) 4'; Akpunonu (yellow card) 15'; Mamadou 34'; Boudadi (yellow card) 44'; Epps (yellow card) 86'	Stadium: Highmark Stadium; Attendance: 5,602; Referee: Sergii Demianchuk

July 27 21	Pittsburgh Riverhounds SC	1–1	Loudoun United FC	Pittsburgh, PA
7:00PM EST	Mertz 12' (pen.); Osumanu (yellow card) 51'; Sample (red card) 90+4'	Report	Leeroman (yellow card) 11'; Johnston (yellow card) 32'; McCabe (yellow card) 49'; Leggett 63'	Stadium: Highmark Stadium; Attendance: 5,613; Referee: Alex Billeter

August 3 22	Sacramento Republic FC	0–1	Pittsburgh Riverhounds SC	Sacramento, CA
11:00PM EST	Timmer (yellow card) 68'	Report	Kizza 43'; Biasi (yellow card) 79'	Stadium: Heart Health Park; Attendance: 9,459; Referee: Elton García

August 7 23	Detroit City FC	0–0	Pittsburgh Riverhounds SC	Hamtramck, MI
7:00PM EST	Cedeno (yellow card) 16'; Amoh (yellow card) 32'; Williams (yellow card) 45+1'; Espeleta (yellow card) 85'	Report	Hogam (yellow card) 63'	Stadium: Keyworth Stadium; Attendance: 7,166; Referee: Brandon Stevis

August 10 24	Pittsburgh Riverhounds SC	0–0	San Antonio FC	Pittsburgh, PA
7:00PM EST	Walti (yellow card) 7'; Etou (yellow card) 90+9'	Report	Mbongue (yellow card) 90+2'	Stadium: Highmark Stadium; Attendance: 5,388; Referee: Alyssa Nichols

August 17 25	Pittsburgh Riverhounds SC	2–2	Colorado Springs Switchbacks FC	Pittsburgh, PA
7:00PM EST	Johnson (yellow card) 40'; Walti 54'; Suber 90+1'	Report	Magee 13'; Tejada (yellow card) 69'; Fjellberg (yellow card) 79'; Santos (yellow card) 87'; Herrera (yellow card) 90+2'; Pierre 90+6'	Stadium: Highmark Stadium; Attendance: 4,332; Referee: Lorenzo Hernandez

August 24 26	Birmingham Legion FC	0–3	Pittsburgh Riverhounds SC	Birmingham, AL
7:00PM EST	Zouhir (yellow card) 27'; McCartney (yellow card) 43'; Dodson (yellow card) 83'; Hernandez-Foster (yellow card) 90+4'	Report	Kizza 34', 39'; Biasi (yellow card) 79'; Johnson 84'	Stadium: Protective Stadium; Referee: Gerald Flores

August 31 27	Indy Eleven	1–1	Pittsburgh Riverhounds SC	Indianapolis, IN
7:00PM EST	Martínez (yellow card) 34'; Lindley (yellow card) 71'; R. Williams (yellow card) 72'; R. Williams 90+7'	Report	Hogan (red card) 4'; Mertz (yellow card) 66'; Griffin 73'	Stadium: Carroll Stadium; Attendance: 10,319; Referee: Elijio Arreguin

September 7 28	Pittsburgh Riverhounds SC	2–0	Rhode Island FC	Pittsburgh, PA
7:00PM EST	Osumanu (yellow card) 42'; Jacquesson 45+5'; Sample 50'; Biasi (yellow card) 55'; Griffin (yellow card) 74'; Mertz (yellow card) 80'	Report	Turnbull (yellow card) 35'; Yao (yellow card) 80'	Stadium: Highmark Stadium; Attendance: 5,619; Referee: Abdou Ndiaye

September 14 29	Tampa Bay Rowdies	2-1	Pittsburgh Riverhounds SC	St. Petersburg, FL
7:30PM EST	Munjoma (yellow card) 45+2'; Bodily (yellow card) 53'; Bubb (yellow card) 56'; Arteaga 71'; Fernandes (yellow card) 76' (goal) 90+1'	Report	Walti 43'; Kizza (yellow card) 67'	Stadium: Al Lang Stadium; Attendance: 4,851; Referee: Brandon Stevis

September 28 30	Pittsburgh Riverhounds SC	1-1	Birmingham Legion FC	Pittsburgh, PA
7:00PM EST	Kizza 22'; Hogan (yellow card) 72'; Johnson (yellow card) 90+4'	Report	McCartney (yellow card) 25'; Nwegbo (yellow card) 33'; Pinho 79'	Stadium: Highmark Stadium; Attendance: 5,537; Referee: Elvis Osmanovic

October 5 31	Miami FC	0-4	Pittsburgh Riverhounds SC	Miami, Florida
7:00PM EST	Santana (yellow card) 19'; Mitrano (yellow card) 44'; Palacios (yellow card) 64' (yellow-red card) 89'	Report	Biasi (yellow card) 32'; Jacquesson 42'; Jacquesson 51', 75'; Kizza 58'; Mertz (yellow card) 76'	Stadium: FIU Stadium; Attendance: 1,823; Referee: Luis Arroyo

October 12 32	Pittsburgh Riverhounds SC	2-0	Charleston Battery	Pittsburgh, Pennsylvania
7:00PM EST	Kizza 2'; Mertz 20'; Osumanu (yellow card) 41'; Blackstock (yellow card) 79'	Report	Segbres (yellow card) 40'; Saydee (yellow card) 72'; Rodríguez (yellow card) 79'	Stadium: Highmark Stadium (Pennsylvania); Attendance: 5,025; Referee: Joe Surgan

October 19 33	Loudoun United FC	0-2	Pittsburgh Riverhounds SC	Leesburg, Virginia
6:00PM EST	Awuah (yellow card) 23'; McCabe (yellow card) 44'; Tingey (yellow card) 86'	Report	Suber (yellow card) 23'; Kizza 33'; Jacquesson 59'; Forbes (yellow card) 90+1'; Rovira (yellow card) 90+3'	Stadium: Segra Field; Attendance: 4,589; Referee: Alejo Calume

October 26 34	Pittsburgh Riverhounds SC	2-0	El Paso Locomotive FC	Pittsburgh, PA
7:00PM EST	Kizza 9'; Ruiz 19' (o.g.); Griffin (yellow card) 44'; DIck (yellow card) 83'	Report	Calvillo (yellow card) 7'; Alfaro (yellow card) 18'; Ortiz (yellow card) 62'; Moreno (yellow card) 70'	Stadium: Highmark Stadium; Attendance: 5,738; Referee: Matthew Corrigan

=== USL Cup ===
November 2, 2024 East	Charleston Battery	1−0	Pittsburgh Riverhounds SC	Mount Pleasant, South Carolina
6:30 PM EDT	Markanich 8'; Molloy (yellow card) 33'	Report	Hogan (yellow card) 53'	Stadium: Patriots Point Soccer Complex; Referee: Nabil Bensalah

=== U.S. Open Cup ===
After finishing as one of the top eight USL Championship clubs in 2023, the Riverhounds will enter the competition in the Round of 32, to be played May 7–8.

May 7 Round of 32	Pittsburgh Riverhounds SC (Pennsylvania)	0–1	(Oklahoma) FC Tulsa	Pittsburgh, PA
7:00PM EST		Report	Tetteh (yellow card) 30'; Goodrum 88'; Goodrum (yellow card) 89'; Ponce (yellow card) 90+1'; St Clair (yellow card) 90+9'	Stadium: Highmark Stadium; Attendance: 1,131; Referee: Geoff Cameron

== Statistics ==
=== Appearances and goals ===
No.	Pos	Player	Nat	USLC			Open Cup			Total		
No.	Pos	Player	Nat	App	St	G	App	St	G	App	St	G
Goalkeepers
1	GK	Eric Dick	(United States)	8	8	0	0	0	0	8	8	0
12	GK	Gabriel Perrotta	(Paraguay)	0	0	0	0	0	0	0	0	0
31	GK	Jacob Randolph	(United States)	0	0	0	0	0	0	0	0	0
Defenders
3	DF	Patrick Hogan	(United States)	6	5	1	0	0	0	6	5	1
4	DF	Dani Rovira	(Colombia)	7	4	0	0	0	0	7	4	0
5	DF	Sean Suber	(United States)	7	1	0	0	0	0	7	1	0
13	DF	Luke Biasi	(United States)	8	7	0	0	0	0	8	7	0
22	DF	Jake Lent-Koop	(United States)	0	0	0	0	0	0	0	0	0
23	DF	Michael DeShields	(Trinidad and Tobago)	2	1	0	0	0	0	2	1	0
28	DF	Illal Osumanu	(Ghana)	8	8	0	0	0	0	8	8	0
44	DF	Pierre Cayet	(France)	1	0	0	0	0	0	1	0	0
Midfielders
2	MF	Danny Griffin	(United States)	8	8	1	0	0	0	8	8	1
8	MF	Junior Etou	(Republic of the Congo)	8	8	0	0	0	0	8	8	0
10	MF	Aidan O'Toole	(United States)	3	0	0	0	0	0	3	0	0
11	MF	Kenardo Forbes	(Jamaica)	8	7	0	0	0	0	8	7	0
14	MF	Robbie Mertz	(United States)	8	8	0	0	0	0	8	8	0
15	MF	Bradley Sample	(United States)	6	2	0	0	0	0	6	2	0
17	MF	Nate Dragisich	(United States)	2	0	0	0	0	0	2	0	0
42	MF	Jackson Wälti	(United States)	4	3	0	0	0	0	4	3	0
Forwards
7	FW	Langston Blackstock	(United States)	8	3	0	0	0	0	8	3	0
9	FW	Emmanuel Johnson	(United States)	4	0	0	0	0	0	4	0	0
19	FW	Edward Kizza	(Uganda)	7	7	2	0	0	0	7	7	2
27	FW	Babacar Diene	(Senegal)	8	3	1	0	0	0	8	3	1
45	FW	Kazaiah Sterling	(England)	6	5	2	0	0	0	6	5	2
Total				8		7	0		0	8		7

=== Top scorers ===
Rank	Pos.	No.	Player	USLC	Open Cup	Total
1	FW	19	(Uganda) Edward Kizza	2	0	2
1	FW	45	(England) Kazaiah Sterling	2	0	2
2	DF	3	(United States) Patrick Hogan	1	0	1
2	MF	2	(United States) Danny Griffin	1	0	1
2	FW	27	(Senegal) Babacar Diene	1	0	1
Total				7	0	7

=== Top assists ===
Rank	Pos.	No.	Player	USLC	Open Cup	Total
1	MF	8	(Republic of the Congo) Junior Etou	2	0	2
2	FW	19	(Uganda) Edward Kizza	1	0	1
2	FW	27	(Senegal) Babacar Diene	1	0	1
2	MF	14	(United States) Robbie Mertz	1	0	1
Total				4	0	4

=== Clean sheets ===
No.	Player	USLC	Open Cup	Total
1	(United States) Eric Dick	4	0	4
