= Dani Rovira (footballer) =

Colombian footballer (born 1996)

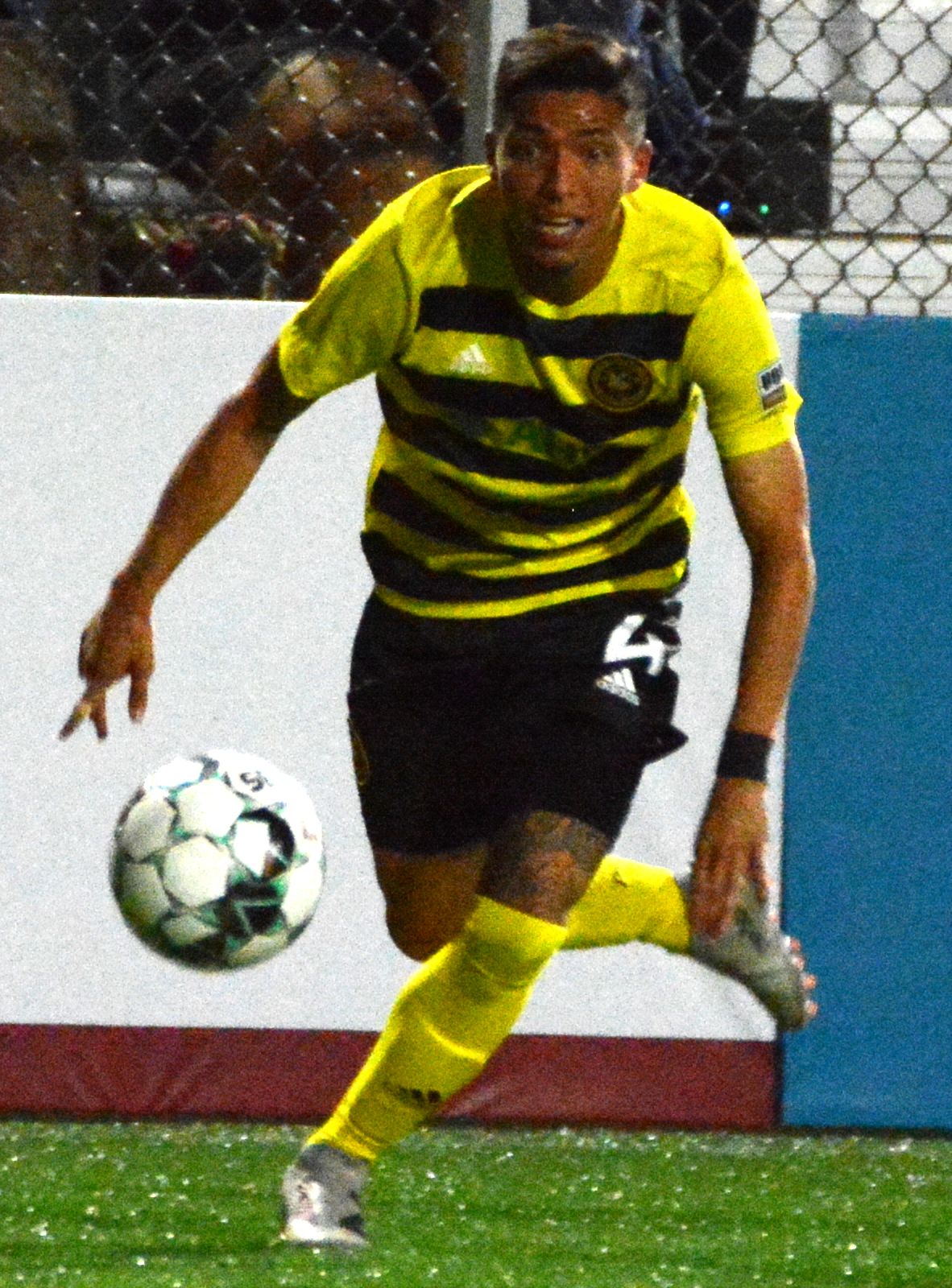
- Rovira with Pittsburgh Riverhounds in 2021

Personal information
- Full name: Daniel Rovira
- Date of birth: 15 December 1996 (age 29)
- Place of birth: Bogota, Colombia
- Height: 1.75 m (5 ft 9 in)
- Positions: Defender; midfielder

Team information
- Current team: Rhode Island FC
- Number: 2

Youth career
- New England Revolution

College career
Years	Team	Apps	(Gls)
2015–2016	Dean Bulldogs	34	(3)
2017–2018	Vermont Catamounts	33	(0)

Senior career*
Years	Team	Apps	(Gls)
2019–2024	Pittsburgh Riverhounds	133	(1)
2025–	Rhode Island FC	19	(0)
- * Club domestic league appearances and goals as of November 7, 2026

Daniel Rovira (born 15 December 1996) is a Colombian footballer who plays as a defender for USL Championship club Rhode Island FC.

== College ==
Rovira played two years of college soccer at Dean College between 2015 and 2016, before transferring to the University of Vermont in 2017.

== Professional career ==
=== Pittsburgh Riverhounds ===
==== 2019 ====
After impressing during a trial with the club, Rovira signed with the USL Championship club Pittsburgh Riverhounds ahead of the 2019 USL Championship season on 8 March 2019. While still fitting in with the team, he appeared as an unused substitute in the Riverhounds' second win of the season, 3–1 against Louisville City. Rovira made his debut for the club in the 3–0 win over the Dayton Dutch Lions in the U.S. Open Cup. Rovira played all but one minute before coming off for Kenardo Forbes. Rovira got another chance in the Open Cup, coming off the bench in the narrow 1–0 win against Indy Eleven. In the next match, Rovira played his first USL Championship game, starting in a 2–2 draw with Ottawa Fury. He would eventually be substituted for Noah Franke after 86 minutes of play. The run in the US Open Cup would end in a 1–0 defeat to the Columbus Crew, though Rovira played his first ever ninety minutes for the club. Rovira was dropped for the next few games but started against Philadelphia Union II. Rovira played 63 minutes and picked up a yellow card before getting replaced by Ryan James. The Riverhounds would finish the regular season by getting first seed in the Eastern Conference. Rovira came off the bench in the 7–0 win over Birmingham Legion, helping the club secure an infamous win in the 2019 USL Championship playoffs. However, the playoff run would come to an end after a 2–1 defeat to Louisville.

==== 2020 ====
Rovira stayed with the Riverhounds for the 2020 USL Championship season, which was heavily affected by the COVID-19 pandemic. Rovira started the first game of the season, a 3–1 win against Louisville. He played 62 minutes before getting replaced by Dakota Barnathan. Rovira was then in and out of the first team, being a substitute against Philadelphia Union II but then getting to start against Indy Eleven. Rovira got his first professional assist in the 2–0 win over Loudoun United. He played a long ball over the top which Steevan Dos Santos was able to get onto the end of and nutmeg Loudoun goalkeeper Colin Miller. However, Rovira was replaced by Jordan Dover in the first half due to an injury. The injury kept him out for the next few games, though he returned to the team in a match against the New York Red Bulls II and then against Hartford Athletic. The win against Hartford was able to clinch the Hounds a playoff spot. The Riverhounds would once again go out of the playoffs at the hands of Louisville, losing 2–0 in a match which Rovira was an unused substitute.

==== 2021 ====
Initially unsigned to a new contract, Rovira was announced as resigned by the Riverhounds on 18 January 2021, signing on a season-long deal with an option for 2022. Rovira played in the Riverhounds' first match of the 2021 USL Championship season, a 3–0 loss to the Tampa Bay Rowdies. Rovira played 61 minutes before Bob Lilley opted to sub him, Tommy Williamson, and Russell Cicerone out for Anthony Velarde, Louis Perez, and Todd Wharton. Against the New York Red Bulls II, Rovira would get his first assist of the 2021 season while the Riverhounds also got their first win. Rovira won the ball back and sent a low cross in which Alex Dixon was able to get onto the end of. He also put in a solid defensive performance for the Riverhounds, making 3 tackles and also winning 10 out of 15 duels he went into. Rovira and the Riverhounds then increased their streak by defeating Loudoun United, 3–2, during the midweek. Rovira played in an unfamiliar position in the 1–0 win over Indy Eleven, starting the match as a central-midfielder compared to his regular full-back position. This result was able to secure a third-straight away victory for the Hounds. Rovira put in a notable performance once again against Loudoun, creating 2 chances, winning 3 tackles, and making 7 interceptions in the 1–0 victory. Rovira added his second assist of the season in a 3–2 win away against the Charleston Battery. Coming on in the 17th minute after an injury to Tom Judge, Rovira kept an overhit pass from Kenardo Forbes in play before finding Alex Dixon unmarked in the penalty area. While the Riverhounds did end up making the playoffs, they were unable to participate in the match against the Birmingham Legion due to multiple players and/or coaches testing positive for COVID-19.

==== 2022 ====
Ahead of the 2022 USL Championship season, Rovira's contract option was picked up, keeping him at the club for a fourth year. He did not appear in the first game of the Riverhounds season, a 3–0 win against Memphis 901, nor in the 2–1 win against Hartford Athletic. He instead played his first game of the 2022 season against Loudoun United, starting in the 2–0 victory, getting a booking in the process before getting substituted for Robby Dambrot after 60 minutes. Against FC Tulsa in a match that would turn out to be a 4–3 win, Rovira attempted to make a defensive play, though his outstretched boot tapped the ball towards goalkeeper Kevin Silva, who let the ball go through his legs. Rovira made up for the error, getting the assist on Dane Kelly's goal. Rovira would send a through ball which Kelly ran onto and slotted past the goalkeeper. Rovira played in the 2–0 loss to FC Cincinnati in the U.S. Open Cup. Rovira played in a 5–2 loss to the Tampa Bay Rowdies, coming off the bench in the landslide defeat. Rovira added his second assist of the season in the 3–0 win against the New York Red Bulls II, sending a through ball for Russell Cicerone to finish past Red Bulls keeper Derrek Chan. Rovira, on a yellow card, was subbed off a minute later. Rovira added his second straight assist in a 1–0 win over Indy Eleven, assisting a late Albert Dikwa goal with yet another through ball, though the ball was lobbed this time. Rovira came off the bench to help the Riverhounds secure a late win against Hartford Athletic, with Shane Wiedt scoring a last-gasp winner. Against Indy Eleven, Rovira got an assist on Cicerone's goal, sending a cross in which Cicerone headed in from close range. Cicerone would later add a second as the Hounds won 2–0. Rovira picked up an assist again against Atlanta United 2, sending a pinpoint cross in which Albert Dikwa headed beyond Vicente Reyes. The goal was ultimately the match-winner. Rovira started against Oakland Roots in a comeback win, playing 90 minutes as a wing-back before getting subbed for William Eyang due to an injury. Despite the injury, Rovira started in the playoff clash with Birmingham Legion FC, where after 120 minutes the teams went to penalties. Edward Kizza's game-winning penalty sent the Riverhounds to the next round. They would end up going out on penalties to Louisville, with Rovira getting subbed after 58 minutes.

==== 2023 ====
With his contract for the 2023 season expiring, Rovira negotiated terms to sign on a 1-year deal with a club option for the 2024 season on 12 January 2023. Rovira made his 2023 USL Championship season debut in the 1–1 draw away from home against Birmingham Legion, starting the match and playing 90 minutes. Rovira would once again start in the second game of the season and the first win of the season away at Memphis 901, where Albert Dikwa scored a hattrick. Rovira picked up his first assist of the season in the 2–0 win over Rio Grande Valley Toros, where he put in a cross headed home by Kenardo Forbes. Following this game, Rovira would miss the next 9 games before coming back into the team for the 3-1 U.S. Open Cup loss away at FC Cincinnati on June 6. He returned to league soccer off the bench against Charleston Battery for Trevor Zwetsloot in the 2–0 win at home. On 29 July 2023 Rovira scored his first professional goal, the 1,001 in club history, in a 4–2 comeback win against Memphis 901 FC. Rovira tapped in Kenardo Forbes's cross at the far post, tying the game at 2 in the second half. Goals from Juan Carlos Obregón and Tola Showunmi secured the comeback. Obregon and Joe Farrell, as well as Rovira, grabbed their first Riverhounds goals. He grabbed an assist in the 2–0 win over Hartford Athletic, assisting Albert Dikwa's goal. Rovira grabbed two assists a few weeks later once again against Hartford, assisting Marc Ybarra's header and Juan Obregon's late game-winner. Rovira grabbed his final assist of the season in the 3–2 win over FC Tulsa at home. After receiving a pass from Danny Griffin, Rovira put in a cross to the back post which Albert Dikwa headed home. A week later, Rovira came off the bench to help secure the Players' Shield for the Riverhounds against Tampa, a 2–0 win. However, the Hounds lost against Detroit City in the first round of the playoffs, 1–0.

==== 2024 ====
On 29 November 2023 it was announced that Rovira would return for his 6th year at the club. He started the first game of the 2024 USL Championship season, a 1–0 loss away to New Mexico United. In the match against Louisville City, Rovira was subbed off in the 27th minute due to performance reasons, with Langston Blackstock coming on to replace him. He returned to the starting lineup in a 1–0 home win against Miami FC. After going on a winless streak of 10 matches, Rovira played in the 5–0 home win against the Oakland Roots. He also helped the Hounds keep a clean sheet away at Sacramento Republic in a game they'd win thanks to an Edward Kizza goal. Rovira got his first assist of the 2024 season in the 2–0 win against Rhode Island, assisting Bradley Sample's Goal of the Week winning header. Rovira also made the Team of the Week following his performance. Rovira played much of the second half against Loudoun United in a must-win fixture for the Hounds, helping them secure a 2-0 and clean sheet. While the Riverhounds did make the playoffs, they lost to the Charleston Battery in the 1st round, 1–0.

On 31 December 2024 Rovira announced via Instagram that he would not be returning to the Riverhounds.

=== Rhode Island FC ===
On 18 January 2025 Rovira signed with fellow USL Championship club Rhode Island FC for the 2025 USL Championship season, linking up with former Pittsburgh teammates Albert Dikwa and Marc Ybarra.
