= Gabriel Perrotta =

Paraguayan footballer (born 1998)

Personal information
- Full name: Gabriel Perrotta Bacellar
- Date of birth: December 26, 1998 (age 27)
- Place of birth: Asunción, Paraguay
- Height: 6 ft 2 in (1.88 m)
- Position: Goalkeeper

Youth career
- 2018: Nacional

College career
Years	Team	Apps	(Gls)
2019–2022	UNC Wilmington Seahawks	61	(0)
2023	Marshall Thundering Herd	21	(0)

Senior career*
Years	Team	Apps	(Gls)
2018–2019	Guarani	0	(0)
2024	Pittsburgh Riverhounds	4	(0)

International career
2015	Paraguay U20	1	(0)
- * Club domestic league appearances and goals

Gabriel Perrotta Bacellar (born December 26, 1998) is a Paraguayan professional footballer who plays as a goalkeeper. He represented Paraguay at youth level.

== Career ==
=== Youth and college ===
Prior to playing for college teams in the United States, Perrotta played for Club Nacional's youth teams. However, he never played for the first team, and joined professional team Club Guaraní in 2018.

Perrotta joined Wilmington in 2019, and was in the league's Rookie Team of the Season. Perrotta kept 6 shutouts in the 2020–21 season, making 4 saves in the 2–0 win over Elon. In 2021, Perrotta had a notable performance in the game against Campbell in the 3–2 loss, making a career high of 7 saves. In 2022, Perrotta held a momentous 3-game shutout streak from September 13–20.

After the 2022 season with Wilmington, Perrotta signed with Marshall Thundering Herd for the 2023 season. Perrotta was named Goalkeeper of the Year with Marshall after the 2023 season. In the games Perrotta played, he kept 10.5 clean sheets (Perrotta missed 6 minutes of a game that Marshall kept a clean sheet in) and of the games he played in, 17 of those were wins. Following the 2023 season with Thundering Herd, Perrotta signed with professional team Pittsburgh Riverhounds.

=== Professional ===
==== Guarani ====
At age 19, Perrotta left youth football and joined Paraguayan club Guarani. He was a substitute in Guarani's 2–1 win over Club Atlético 3 de Febrero. Perrotta departed Guarani in 2019 and returned to college football, this time in the United States with UNC Wilmington Seahawks.

==== Pittsburgh Riverhounds ====
Perrotta returned to professional football when on March 7, 2024, he signed with Pittsburgh Riverhounds SC in the USL Championship as a former trialist. He was given the number 12. Perrotta was the second player from UNC Wilmington to sign with Pittsburgh that year, as Jacob Randolph had as well. Former Riverhounds goalkeeper Jonathan Gomes had also signed from Wilmington the previous year.

Perrotta got his first start (and his professional debut) for Pittsburgh in the U.S. Open Cup against FC Tulsa, where coach Bob Lilley decided to rotate the squad heavily. Perrotta would receive praise from fans due to his composure in between the sticks, though FC Tulsa were still able to get the win, 1-0. Perrotta made 3 saves. A few days later, Perrotta would get to start a USL Championship game once again against FC Tulsa, getting picked over Eric Dick. Perrotta saved a penalty in the 12th minute but the ball came off the post and off Perrotta's head and into the net. It was given as a Perrotta own-goal. However, later in the game, Perrotta made a foul leading to a penalty. He received a yellow-card, though he ended up saving Phillip Goodrum's penalty. The match ended 2-2.

Perrotta kept his first clean sheet in the 4-0 thrashing of Miami FC a few months later, only getting the start because of an injury to Eric Dick. Perrotta made four saves, including saving a deflection after a shot from Jordan Ayimbila. The second shot from Frank López was blocked by Illal Osumanu, preserving a first professional clean sheet for Perrotta. Perrotta, as well as his teammate, Bertin Jacquesson, were honoured in the Team of the Week for Week 31.

He became a free agent following Pittsburgh's 2024 season.

== International career ==
Perrotta represented the Paraguay national under-17 football team, playing at the U17 FIFA World Cup Chile 2015 and the South American qualifiers.

== Honours ==
Individual

- Sun Belt Conference Goalkeeper of the Year:2023
