= Tola Showunmi =

English footballer (born 2000)

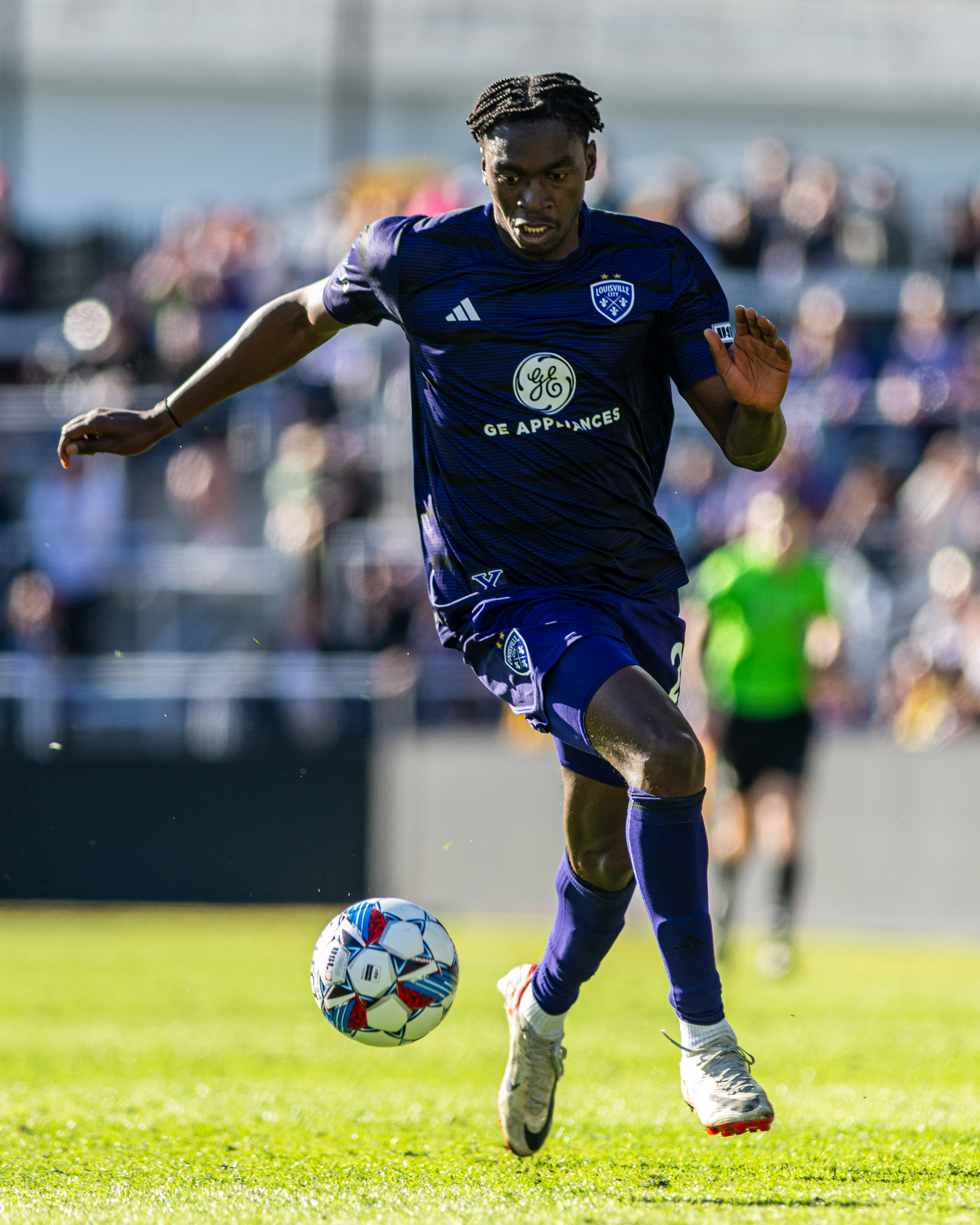
- Tola Showunmi playing for Louisville City in 2024

Personal information
- Full name: Abiola Adetola Showunmi
- Date of birth: 3 July 2000 (age 26)
- Place of birth: Enfield, London, England
- Height: 6 ft 3 in (1.91 m)
- Position: Forward

Team information
- Current team: Louisville City
- Number: 14

Youth career
- 2014–2016: Boreham Wood
- 2016–2017: Cheshunt

College career
Years	Team	Apps	(Gls)
2018–2019	Merrimack Warriors	35	(13)
2020–2022	New Hampshire Wildcats	41	(14)

Senior career*
Years	Team	Apps	(Gls)
2017–2018	Cheshunt	8	(0)
2023	Pittsburgh Riverhounds	28	(4)
2024	Louisville City	10	(2)
2024–2026	Crawley Town	26	(4)
2026–	Louisville City	25	(2)
- * Club domestic league appearances and goals as of 12:38, 8 November 2026 (UTC)

Abiola Adetola Showunmi (born 3 July 2000) is an English professional footballer who plays as a forward for USL Championship club Louisville City.

== Career ==
=== Early career & College ===
Showunmi played as a youth player with Boreham Wood and Cheshunt, the latter of which he made eight senior league appearances for in the Isthmian League over the 2016–17 and 2017–18 seasons.

In 2018, Showumni moved to the United States to play college soccer at Merrimack College. In two seasons with the Warriors, Showumni made 35 appearances, netted 13 goals and received Northeast Conference first team all-conference honours in 2019. In 2020, he transferred to the University of New Hampshire, where he went on to make 41 appearances, scoring 14 goals and tallying six assists. With the Wildcats, Showumni was voted to the United Soccer Coaches All-America Third Team and claimed the America East Conference Striker of the Year in 2021. He also earned America East All-Conference First Team honors in 2021, and Second Team honors in 2022.

On 12 January 2022, Showumni was selected 88th overall in the 2022 MLS SuperDraft by Atlanta United. However, he went unsigned by the team and instead returned to New Hampshire to continue his time at college.

=== Pittsburgh Riverhounds SC ===
On 1 March 2023, Showumni signed with USL Championship club Pittsburgh Riverhounds ahead of their 2023 season. He made his professional debut on 11 March 2023, appearing as a 79th-minute substitute during a 1–1 draw with Birmingham Legion. While gametime for Showunmi wasn't guaranteed as strikers like Albert Dikwa, Edward Kizza, and Juan Carlos Obregón often started under manager Bob Lilley, Showunmi was able to register 4 goals in 28 games. Showunmi came off of the bench in a game against Memphis 901, assisting one of Albert Dikwa's goals after a well-timed through-ball. He got his first start in the 0–0 draw against FC Tulsa, playing off the left wing alongside Tony López centrally and Burke Fahling on the right. Showunmi was substituted off in the 67' minute for DZ Harmon. Showunmi also contributed in the U.S. Open Cup, assisting Edward Kizza's opener against the Maryland Bobcats before getting substituted for Arturo Ordoñez. Showunmi started for the Riverhounds against the New England Revolution in the 1–0 win, creating multiple chances and having a few shots on target to help secure the upset and send the Riverhounds into the next round of the Open Cup. The Riverhounds would also go on to defeat the Columbus Crew at Highmark Stadium, with Showunmi starting along with the goalscorer, Albert Dikwa. Showunmi was able to help the Riverhounds secure a huge upset win against the Crew. The miraculous run in the Open Cup came to an end against FC Cincinnati, though Showunmi was able to notch a goal against Cincinnati, making a tackle against an FC Cincinnati defender and sliding it by Alec Kann.

Back in the USL Championship, Showunmi scored against the Charleston Battery to put the Riverhounds atop of the Championship table after receiving a through-ball by Luke Biasi. Showunmi then dribbled around Trey Muse and scored into the open net. Showunmi scored a notable goal two games later against the San Diego Loyal. After going 1–0 down, Showunmi received a cross from Marc Ybarra. Showunmi was able to pull the ball back and backheel it into the goal, beating Koke Vegas. This goal would later get nominated for USL Championship Goal of the Season. Illal Osumanu's goal also finished off the comeback later on in the game. Showunmi also netted a consolation goal in the 3–1 loss to Indy Eleven. Showunmi would also net the fourth goal in the Riverhounds' comeback win over Memphis 901. Showunmi received a through-ball from Ybarra, and, after turning away from Memphis defender Jelani Peters, picked out the bottom left corner. Showunmi picked up an assist in the next game for the Riverhounds, assisting Albert Dikwa's opener vs. the Tampa Bay Rowdies. Showunmi received a pass from Ordonez, drawing in defenders and creating space for Dikwa, who he then played a pass to. This was his third goal contribution in his past three games. In the reverse-fixture against the Rowdies, Showunmi would also make a tremendous impact after coming on for Nathan Dossantos. Showunmi came on and quickly received a pass from Kenardo Forbes. Showunmi would then dribble into the box and drive a low-cross across goal for Arturo Ordonez to flick into the back of the net, beating goalkeeper, Connor Sparrow. This goal would clinch the Riverhounds the 2023 USL Championship Players' Shield. Showunmi described the assist as "unreal." The Riverhounds would end up losing to Detroit City in the quarterfinals of the USL Championship playoffs.

=== Louisville City FC ===
Showunmi joined Louisville City on 15 December 2023 for the 2024 season. He made his Louisville debut in the season opener against El Paso, coming on as a substitute for the goalscorer, Wilson Harris. He made ten appearances during the season while scoring two goals. His first goal for the club was the final goal of Louisville's six goal victory over Hartford. Showunmi was given his first and only Louisville start against his former club the Riverhounds in the 1–0 away win. His second goal for the club came against Birmingham, getting the fourth goal over the 4–1 win after an outside of the box strike. Showunmi played his final game for Louisville in the 1–0 loss to Oakland Roots. He then picked up a minor injury, stopping him from playing any other games.

=== Crawley Town ===
On 15 August 2024, it was announced that Showunmi had signed for Crawley Town on an initial two-year contract. He made his debut in a 2–1 loss to Wrexham, coming on in the 81st minute for Ronan Darcy. Showunmi had one shot on target and created one chance, but was unable to help his team secure 3 points. He then appeared against Wycombe Wanderers, getting to play 27 minutes and picking up a yellow card in the 1–0 loss. His first goal for Crawley came in the final minutes of extra time in a first-round FA Cup match against Maidenhead United at York Road, shooting from outside of the box and finding the bottom corner. Showunmi once again found the net in a 2–1 loss to Wycombe Wanderers in the EFL Trophy, tapping home the rebound from Jack Roles's shot from distance. His goal would level the match, but another first half goal from Wycombe secured a defeat. Showunmi scored two matches in a row, scoring the second in a 4–3 loss to Lincoln City in the FA Cup, and then scoring the opener in the EFL League One match against Charlton Athletic. Showunmi's goal against Charlton came from outside of the box, curling the ball into the top right corner.

=== Return to Louisville City ===
On 23 January 2026, Louisville City announced the signing of Showunmi on a contract through the 2027 season.

== Career statistics ==
As of match played on 29 December 2024

Appearances and goals by club, season and competition
Club	Season	League			National cup (Note: Includes US Open Cup, FA Cup)		League cup (Note: Includes EFL Cup)		Other		Total	
Club	Season	Division	Apps	Goals	Apps	Goals	Apps	Goals	Apps	Goals	Apps	Goals
Cheshunt	2016–17	Isthmian League North Division	2	0	0	0	–		0	0	2	0
Cheshunt	2017–18	Isthmian League North Division	6	0	0	0	–		1 (Note: Appearance in FA Trophy)	0	7	0
Cheshunt	Total		8	0	0	0	–		1	0	9	0
Merrimack Warriors	2018	NCAA Division II	19	7	0	0	0	0	0	0	19	7
Merrimack Warriors	2019	NEC	16	6	0	0	0	0	0	0	16	6
Merrimack Warriors	Total		35	13	0	0	0	0	0	0	35	13
New Hampshire Wildcats	2020	AmEast	5	1	0	0	0	0	0	0	5	1
New Hampshire Wildcats	2021	AmEast	21	10	0	0	0	0	0	0	21	10
New Hampshire Wildcats	2022	AmEast	15	3	0	0	0	0	0	0	15	3
New Hampshire Wildcats	Total		41	14	0	0	0	0	0	0	41	14
Pittsburgh Riverhounds	2023	USL Championship	29	4	4	1	0	0	0	0	33	5
Louisville City	2024	USL Championship	10	2	0	0	0	0	0	0	10	2
Crawley Town	2024–25	EFL League One	17	4	2	2	0	0	2 (Note: Appearances in EFL Trophy)	1	21	7
Career total			140	37	6	3	0	0	3	1	149	41
