= Luke Biasi =

American soccer player (born 1999)

Personal information
- Full name: Luke A. Biasi
- Date of birth: July 15, 1999 (age 27)
- Place of birth: Buford, Georgia, U.S.
- Height: 1.83 m (6 ft 0 in)
- Position: Defender

Team information
- Current team: Phoenix Rising
- Number: 20

Youth career
- Georgia United
- Atlanta Fire United
- United Futbol Academy

College career
Years	Team	Apps	(Gls)
2017–2020	Memphis Tigers	49	(1)
2021	Syracuse Orange	18	(0)

Senior career*
Years	Team	Apps	(Gls)
2018	Peachtree City MOBA	8	(0)
2021	Southern Soccer Academy Kings	8	(1)
2022–2025	Pittsburgh Riverhounds	102	(0)
2026–	Phoenix Rising	27	(0)
- * Club domestic league appearances and goals as of October 31, 2026

Luke A. Biasi (born July 15, 1999) is an American soccer player who currently plays as a defender for Phoenix Rising in the USL Championship.

== Career ==
=== Youth ===
Biasi played high school soccer at Flowery Branch High School, as well as playing club soccer for a year with Georgia United, six years with Atlanta Fire United and a single year at the United Futbol Academy.

=== College and amateur ===
Biasi attended the University of Memphis to play college soccer. Over four seasons with the Tigers, included a truncated 2020 season due to the COVID-19 pandemic, Biasi made 49 appearances, scoring one goal and tallying two assists. He was named AAC All-Academic Team in both 2017 and 2018. In 2021, Biasi transferred to Syracuse University for his full senior season, making 18 appearances and finishing with one assist to his name.

While at college, Biasi spent time in the USL PDL, now named the USL League Two, with Peachtree City MOBA in 2018, and Southern Soccer Academy Kings in 2021.

=== Professional ===
On February 24, 2022, Biasi signed his first professional contract, joining USL Championship club Pittsburgh Riverhounds prior to their 2022 season. He made his professional debut on April 2, 2022, starting in a 2–0 win over Loudoun United. Biasi picked up an assist against Charleston Battery, sending a through-ball to Tola Showunmi, who scored. The game finished 2–0.
