= Bradley Sample =

American soccer player (born 2000)

Personal information
- Date of birth: November 12, 2000 (age 25)
- Place of birth: Channahon, Illinois, United States
- Height: 6 ft 0 in (1.83 m)
- Position: Midfielder

Team information
- Current team: Pittsburgh Riverhounds
- Number: 15

Youth career
- –2019: Sockers FC

College career
Years	Team	Apps	(Gls)
2019–2023	Louisville Cardinals	90	(4)

Senior career*
Years	Team	Apps	(Gls)
2023	Thunder Bay Chill	11	(1)
2024–	Pittsburgh Riverhounds	64	(2)
- * Club domestic league appearances and goals as of November 7, 2026

Bradley Sample (born November 12, 2000) is an American professional soccer player who plays as a midfielder for Pittsburgh Riverhounds in the USL Championship.

== Career ==
=== Youth ===
Sample played club soccer for the Sockers FC in the USSDA where he served as team captain, and helped guide the team to the 2017-18 USSDA under-19 quarterfinals.

=== College and amateur ===
In 2019, Sample attended the University of Louisville to play college soccer. Over five seasons with the Cardinals, including a truncated 2020 season due to the COVID-19 pandemic, Sample made 90 appearances, scoring four goals and tallying seven assists. He was named to the All-ACC Academic Team in three consecutive seasons between 2020 and 2022. Sample helped take his team to the ACC Championship opening round, even scoring in the 2–1 loss to the Virginia Tech Hokies. Sample scored 4 times for Louisville, including one that secured a draw against Wake Forest.

Sample appeared for USL League Two side Thunder Bay Chill during their 2023 season, where he made 11 appearances and scored a single goal.

=== Professional ===
On January 26, 2024, Sample signed his first professional contract with USL Championship side Pittsburgh Riverhounds, along with former ACC Championship opponent, Jackson Wälti. He made his first appearance in the 3–1 loss to Louisville City, and then making his first start against Phoenix Rising. Sample recorded two assists in the 5–0 win over Oakland Roots, assisting Brunallergene Etou and Sean Suber. Sample was shown a straight red card in the 1–1 draw with Loudoun United after a foul on Kalil ElMedkhar. Sample scored his first professional goal in a 2–0 win over Rhode Island. The goal, a looping header from the top of the box after Dani Rovira's cross, went on to win USL Championship Goal of the Week.
