= Patrick Hogan (soccer) =

American soccer player (born 1997)

Personal information
- Date of birth: September 17, 1997 (age 29)
- Place of birth: Charlotte, North Carolina, United States
- Height: 6 ft 4 in (1.93 m)
- Position: Defender

Team information
- Current team: Indy Eleven
- Number: 3

Youth career
- 2011–2016: Charlotte Soccer Academy

College career
Years	Team	Apps	(Gls)
2017–2020	Charlotte 49ers	64	(9)

Senior career*
Years	Team	Apps	(Gls)
2019	Discoveries SC	4	(1)
2021–2022	Charleston Battery	37	(2)
2023–2024	Pittsburgh Riverhounds	51	(1)
2025–	Indy Eleven	19	(2)
- * Club domestic league appearances and goals as of October 31, 2026

Patrick Hogan (born September 17, 1997) is an American professional soccer player who plays as a defender for Indy Eleven in the USL Championship.

== Career ==
=== Youth ===
Hogan attended Charlotte Catholic High School and played club soccer as part of the USSF side Charlotte Soccer Academy. He was named to TopDrawerSoccer.com's Best XI for the 2014 USSDA Summer Showcase. At high school Hogan earned Honor Roll all four years and was as a member of Charlotte Catholic's National Honor Society.

=== College and amateur ===
Hogan played college soccer at the University of North Carolina at Charlotte between 2017 and 2020. He redshirted his freshman season and his senior season was affected by the COVID-19 pandemic. During his four seasons with the 49ers, Hogan made 64 appearances and scored 9 goals. He was named on 2021 MAC Hermann Trophy Watch List and was 2021 Conference USA Preseason Defensive Player of the Year. In his career, Hogan was a two-time first team All-Conference USA selection. In his senior year he was a first team United Soccer Coaches All-Southeast Region selection after earning second team honors last season. In 2019, he was named to the Conference USA All-Tournament team.

In 2019, Hogan also played with USL League Two side Discoveries SC.

=== Professional ===
On May 26, 2021, Hogan signed with USL Championship side Charleston Battery. He made his debut for the club on June 8, 2021, appearing as a 65th-minute substitute during a 1–0 win over Loudoun United. Following the 2022 season, Hogan was released by Charleston.

On February 15, 2023, Hogan signed a one-year deal with USL Championship side Pittsburgh Riverhounds. He left the club following the expiration of his contract at the end of the 2024 season.

Hogan joined Indy Eleven on December 12, 2024. He made his debut for the club on March 15, 2025, in the club's 3–1 league away victory over Miami FC to open their season, in which Hogan scored the third goal of the match and his first for Indy Eleven.
