= Michael DeShields =

American soccer player (born 1998)

Personal information
- Full name: Michael Dominic DeShields
- Date of birth: April 23, 1998 (age 28)
- Place of birth: Baltimore, Maryland, United States
- Height: 1.85 m (6 ft 1 in)
- Position: Defender

Team information
- Current team: Virginia Dream FC

Youth career
- Baltimore Celtic

College career
Years	Team	Apps	(Gls)
2018–2020	Wake Forest Demon Deacons	60	(3)

Senior career*
Years	Team	Apps	(Gls)
2019	Treasure Coast Tritons	7	(1)
2021	New England Revolution II	0	(0)
2021	D.C. United	0	(0)
2021	→ Loudoun United (loan)	14	(0)
2022	New England Revolution II	17	(0)
2023–2024	Pittsburgh Riverhounds	13	(0)
2024	Hartford Athletic	8	(0)
2025	Charlotte Independence	3	(0)
2026–	Virginia Dream FC		
- * Club domestic league appearances and goals as of October 31, 2025

Michael Dominic DeShields (born April 23, 1998) is an American professional soccer player who plays as a defender who currently plays for National Premier Soccer League club Virginia Dream FC.

== Career ==
=== Early life ===
DeShields was born in Baltimore, Maryland and attended the McDonogh School. In 2015 he led the school's varsity soccer team as it accomplished a 21-0-1 record and won the MIAA Class A State Championship. For his efforts, DeShields was honored as Maryland Boys' Soccer Gatorade Player of the Year in 2015. After graduating from McDonough, he went to college at Wake Forest University, joining their soccer team. DeShields was also part of the Baltimore Celtic academy.

In 2019, DeShields also appeared in the USL League Two for Treasure Coast Tritons.

=== Professional ===
On November 30, 2020, DeShields signed a contract with the New England Revolution II in USL League One while finishing his college career at Wake Forest. However, he did not appear on their roster, as the league's season was already over and DeShields entered the 2021 MLS SuperDraft from Wake Forest. He was selected in the first round with the fifth overall pick by D.C. United. Under MLS rules, D.C. United would either have to make him an offer, or his rights would default back to the Revolution II.

On February 5, 2021, DeShields officially signed with D.C. United.

On May 18, 2021, DeShields made his professional debut, appearing as a half-time substitute for D.C. United's USL Championship side Loudoun United during a 2–1 loss to New York Red Bulls II. DeShields made his first start for Loudoun on May 29, in a 1–0 win over New Mexico United.

Following the 2021 season, DeShields was released by D.C. United.

DeShields rejoined New England Revolution II on February 4, 2022, ahead of their inaugural MLS Next Pro season. Following the 2022 season, his option was declined by New England.

On February 28, 2023, DeShields joined USL Championship side Pittsburgh Riverhounds.

On June 19, 2024, DeShields joined fellow USL club Hartford Athletic after getting minimal game time in the first half of the 2024 Riverhounds season.

On February 20, 2024, DeShields signed with USL League One side Charlotte Independence.

=== International ===
On January 27, 2021, DeShields was called up to the senior Trinidad and Tobago national football team camp to train for a friendly match against the United States men's national soccer team taking place on January 30. However, he did not appear on the gameday roster. DeShields is not yet cap-tied, so he is currently eligible to play for the senior team of either Trinidad & Tobago or the US.

== Personal life ==
Michael Dominic DeShields is the son of Jeanette Gibbs and Michael DeShields, and is the oldest of their four children. He majored in Communications while at Wake Forest.
