= Babacar Diene =

Senegalese footballer (born 1996)

Personal information
- Full name: Babacar Diene
- Date of birth: October 25, 1996 (age 30)
- Place of birth: Thiès, Senegal
- Height: 6 ft 0 in (1.83 m)
- Position: Forward

Team information
- Current team: One Knoxville
- Number: 7

College career
Years	Team	Apps	(Gls)
2022–2023	Rider Broncs	37	(16)

Senior career*
Years	Team	Apps	(Gls)
2022	FC Motown		
2024	Pittsburgh Riverhounds	23	(1)
2025–	One Knoxville	59	(16)
- * Club domestic league appearances and goals as of October 31, 2026

Babacar Diene (born October 25, 1996) is a Senegalese professional footballer who plays as a forward for USL League One club One Knoxville. Before becoming a professional, Diene played for FC Motown in USL League Two.

== Early life and education ==
Diene was born to Mody Diene in 1996 in Thiès. He has a younger sister, Khoudia.

Diene graduated from CEM Ballabey High School before attending Rider University.

== Career ==
=== Amateur and college ===
In 2022, Diene played for FC Motown in USL League Two. He also helped them win the NPSL title.

Later that year, he joined the Rider Broncs. In 2022, he played all 17 of the Broncs's games and started in 16, scoring 3 goals and 2 assists. The following year, he scored 13 goals and 3 assists across 20 games. The following season, he scored 13 goals and 3 assists across 20 games. On November 1, 2023, Diene scored a hattrick for the Broncs against Saint Peter's in the 4–1 win. While with the Broncs, Diene played with Momo Diop, who originated from the same town in Senegal.

=== Professional ===
==== Pittsburgh Riverhounds ====
In January 2024, Diene signed with the USL Championship club Pittsburgh Riverhounds. Riverhounds coach Bob Lilley praised Diene for his speed and finishing ability. He made his debut against New Mexico United on March 9 in the 1-0 loss. In the third game of the season against Louisville City FC, Diene got his first goal contribution, assisting Edward Kizza's goal in the 3-1 loss. A few weeks later, Diene scored his first professional goal, finding the back of the net in the 3-1 win over Phoenix Rising FC. He became a free agent following Pittsburgh's 2024 season.

==== One Knoxville ====
On February 3, 2025, Diene was announced as signed by USL League One club One Knoxville for their 2025 season. Diene scored a free-kick, as well as assisting Scott McLeod's goal, in a 0–3 win over Appalachian FC in the U.S. Open Cup.

== Honours ==
=== Club ===
- National Premier Soccer League: 2022
