= Langston Blackstock =

American soccer player (born 2000)

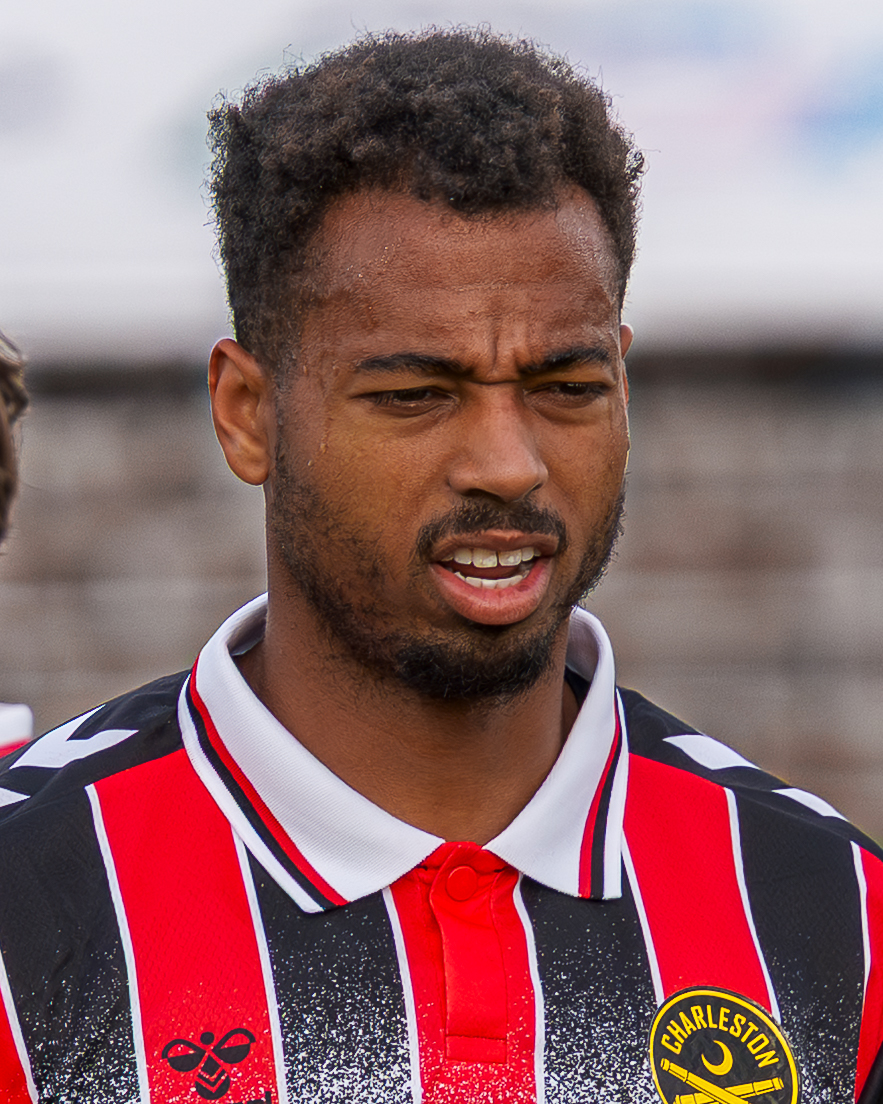
- Blackston with the Charleston Battery in 2026

Personal information
- Date of birth: March 23, 2000 (age 26)
- Place of birth: Marietta, Georgia, United States
- Height: 6 ft 2 in (1.88 m)
- Positions: Full-back; forward

Team information
- Current team: Charleston Battery
- Number: 7

Youth career
- 2017–2018: Concorde Fire

College career
Years	Team	Apps	(Gls)
2018	Coastal Carolina Chanticleers	8	(0)
2019–2022	Clayton State Lakers	65	(32)

Senior career*
Years	Team	Apps	(Gls)
2021–2022	Southern Soccer Academy Kings	17	(3)
2023–2024	Pittsburgh Riverhounds	47	(1)
2025–	Charleston Battery	46	(2)
- * Club domestic league appearances and goals as of November 4, 2026

Langston Blackstock (born March 23, 2000) is an American professional soccer player who plays as a full-back for USL Championship club Charleston Battery.

== Career ==
=== Youth ===
Blackstock attended Marietta High School, where he graduated with honors in 2018. He helped lead the soccer team to the regional quarterfinals and a state championship game during his time at Marietta. He also played club soccer with local USSDA side Concorde Fire.

=== College and amateur ===
In 2018, Blackstock committed to playing college soccer at Coastal Carolina University. He played eight games for the Chanticleers during his lone season there. He transferred to Clayton State University in 2019, and played four seasons with the Lakers, scoring 32 goals in 65 games, also tallying 12 assists. In his senior season, Blackstock led the Peach Belt Conference in scoring with 15 goals, earning First Team All-Conference and All-Southeast Region honors.

Whilst at college, Blackstock also played in the USL League Two with Southern Soccer Academy Kings, scoring three goals in 17 appearances across the 2021 and 2022 seasons.

=== Professional ===
On February 16, 2023, Blackstock signed a one-year deal with USL Championship side Pittsburgh Riverhounds. He made his professional debut on March 24, 2023, appearing as a 77th-minute substitute during a 1–1 draw with Miami FC. He became a free agent following Pittsburgh's 2024 season.

On January 7, 2025, Blackstock joined Charleston Battery on a multi-year contract.
