= Sean Suber =

American soccer player (born 2001)

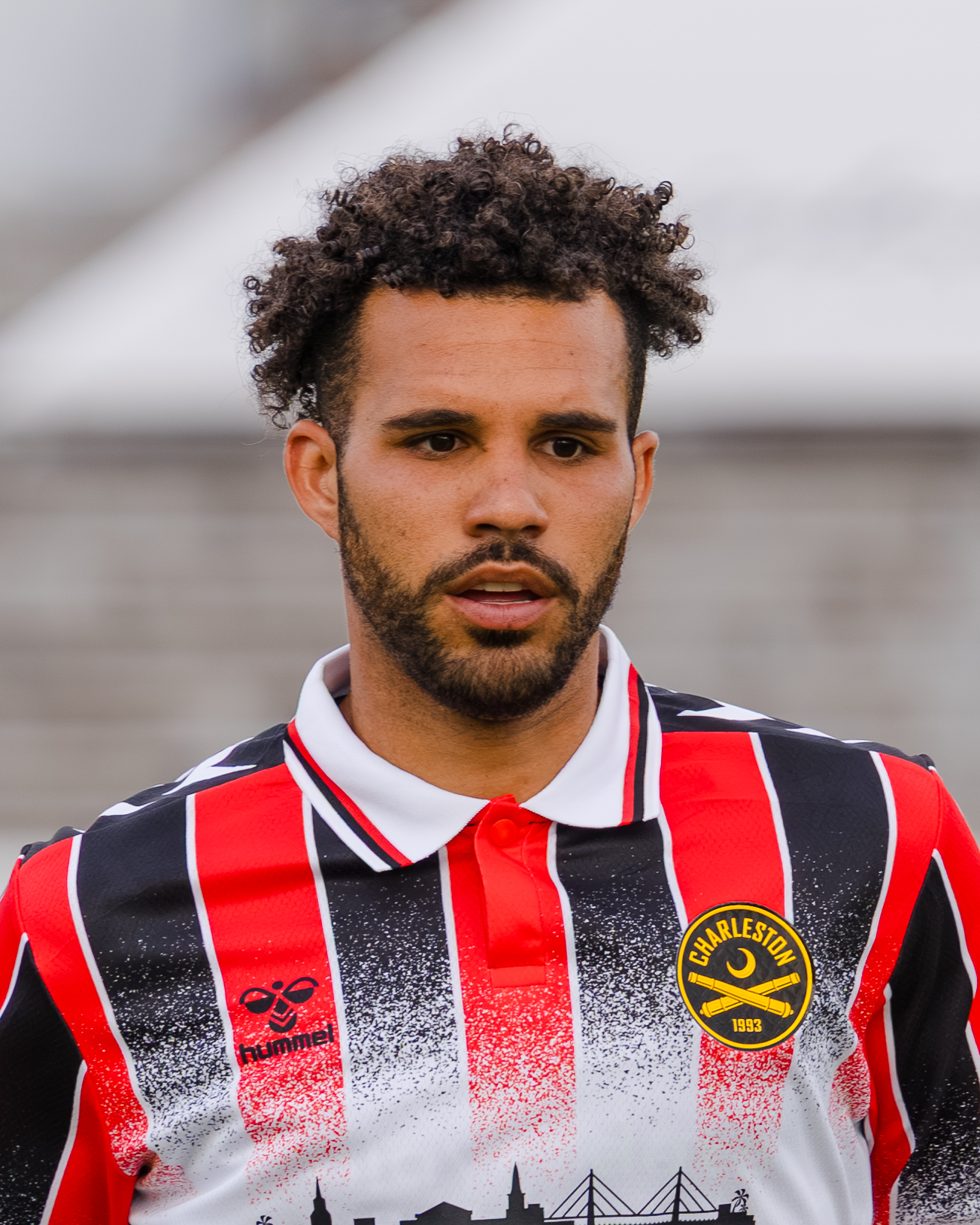
- Suber with the Charleston Battery in 2026

Personal information
- Full name: Sean Jacob Suber
- Date of birth: June 13, 2001 (age 25)
- Place of birth: Charlotte, North Carolina, U.S.
- Height: 6 ft 1 in (1.85 m)
- Position: Defender

Team information
- Current team: Charleston Battery
- Number: 5

Youth career
- –2019: Charlotte Independence

College career
Years	Team	Apps	(Gls)
2019–2022	Charlotte 49ers	37	(4)

Senior career*
Years	Team	Apps	(Gls)
2023	Huntsville City	26	(0)
2024–2025	Pittsburgh Riverhounds	62	(4)
2026–	Charleston Battery	28	(1)
- * Club domestic league appearances and goals as of November 4, 2026

Sean Jacob Suber (born 13 June 2001) is an American professional soccer player who plays as a full-back or center-back for USL Championship club Charleston Battery.

Suber played for the Charlotte Independence academy, and also for Nashville SC.

== Career ==
=== Youth and college ===
Suber is formerly of the Charlotte Independence academy. He then played in college for the Charlotte 49ers. He won the Defensive Player of the Week on multiple occasions. He scored his first goal in the 2021 season nine games in. Suber helped Charlotte to an explosive 5–0 win over the Winthrop Eagles, putting in a good defensive performance while also scoring from the penalty spot. The same happened against Detroit Mercy Titans, scoring a penalty and playing good defensively. Suber wore the captain's armband during his time with Charlotte. Following a successful 2023 season, Suber was drafted during the 2023 MLS SuperDraft by Nashville SC.

=== Professional ===
After being drafted by Nashville, he was listed as a player for the MLS Next Pro affiliate to Nashville, Huntsville City FC. Suber made his debut in a 1–1 draw against Crown Legacy FC. Suber did well in the final game of the season to provide an assist to Nebiyou Perry, though this game ended as a 2–2 draw with Chicago Fire FC II.

Suber joined USL Championship team Pittsburgh Riverhounds on January 19, 2024, along with Pierre Cayet. He made his debut against New Mexico United in the 1–0 loss. Suber scored his first goal for the club in the 5–0 win over Oakland Roots, heading home a Bradley Sample cross. In the 2025 USL Championship playoffs, Suber scored the winning penalty for the Riverhounds against Hartford Athletic.
