= Jonathan Gomes =

American soccer player (born 1999)

Personal information
- Full name: Jonathan Gomes
- Date of birth: February 9, 1999 (age 27)
- Place of birth: Broward County, Florida, United States
- Height: 6 ft 3 in (1.91 m)
- Position: Goalkeeper

Youth career
- 2019–2021: UNC Wilmington
- 2021–2023: Mercyhurst Lakers

Senior career*
Years	Team	Apps	(Gls)
2023	Pittsburgh Riverhounds	0	(0)
- * Club domestic league appearances and goals

Jonathan Gomes (born February 9, 1999) is an American soccer player who last played as a goalkeeper for USL Championship club Pittsburgh Riverhounds SC.

Gomes played for both the Erie Commodores and Mercyhurst Lakers soccer team multiple times, having been loaned between the two.

== Career ==
=== Youth ===
During his youth career, he started with UNC Wilmington Seahawks soccer team. He left the Seahawks on loan and went to the Florida Elite Soccer Academy until returning to the Seahawks in 2020. After staying at the Seahawks for another year, the Mercyhurst Lakers acquired Gomes on a free transfer. During his time with Mercyhurst, he was named to the Scholar All-American team after a very successful season in 2022. Gomes had a standout game against Gannon, making multiple saves in the impressive 4–0 win. He was loaned to the Erie Commodores for the season, and shortly after returning to the Mercyhurst Lakers, he signed with the Pittsburgh Riverhounds.

=== Pittsburgh Riverhounds ===
Gomes signed with the Riverhounds in 2023 on a 1-year deal with an option to extend the contract until 2024, despite being the third choice keeper behind Jahmali Waite and Christian Garner. Following the 2023 season, Gomes' option for 2024 was not picked up, and he became a free agent.
