= Scott Gibson =

English footballer

Personal information
- Date of birth: 26 August 1984 (age 42)
- Place of birth: Saltburn-by-the-Sea, England
- Height: 5 ft 8 in (1.73 m)
- Position: Midfielder

Team information
- Current team: Pittsburgh Riverhounds (academy director)

Youth career
- Middlesbrough

College career
| Years | Team | Apps | (Gls) |
| 2003–2006 | Duquesne Dukes | 37 | (5) |

Senior career*
| Years | Team | Apps | (Gls) |
| 2008–2009 | Pittsburgh Riverhounds | 4 | (0) |
- * Club domestic league appearances and goals

Scott Gibson (born 26 August 1984) is an English former professional footballer who played as a midfielder. He now works as the academy director of USL Championship side Pittsburgh Riverhounds.

== Career ==
After studying business at Duquesne University, Gibson turned professional with the Pittsburgh Riverhounds in the USL Second Division in 2008, making his professional debut on 7 June 2008 in a 5–3 away defeat to the Wilmington Hammerheads.

He now works as the academy director for the Riverhounds.
