= DZ Harmon =

Liberian professional footballer

Personal information
- Full name: Dionysius Harmon
- Date of birth: October 22, 1996 (age 30)
- Place of birth: Monrovia, Liberia
- Height: 6 ft 1 in (1.85 m)
- Position: Midfielder

Youth career
- Atlanta Silverbacks

College career
Years	Team	Apps	(Gls)
2017	Clayton State Lakers	17	(8)
2018–2020	Coastal Carolina Chanticleers	45	(1)

Senior career*
Years	Team	Apps	(Gls)
2017–2019	Atlanta SC	27	(3)
2020	Ginga Atlanta		
2021–2022	Charleston Battery	54	(2)
2023–2024	Pittsburgh Riverhounds	7	(1)
2024–	Entente SSG	25	(4)

International career^{‡}
2023–	Liberia	1	(0)
- * Club domestic league appearances and goals as of July 4, 2025 ‡ National team caps and goals as of September 12, 2023

Dionysius "DZ" Harmon (born October 22, 1996) is a Liberian professional footballer who plays as a midfielder for the Championnat National 3 club Entente SSG and the Liberia national team.

== Career ==
=== Youth ===
Harmon played soccer at South Gwinnett High School, as well as at club level with local side Atlanta Silverbacks.

=== College and amateur ===
Harmon played a year of college soccer at Clayton State University in 2017, scoring 8 goals and tallying 1 assist in 17 appearances for the Lakers. Harmon transferred to Coastal Carolina University for 2018, where he played three seasons for the Chanticleers, scoring a single goal and tallying 4 assists in 45 appearances. During his time at Coastal Carolina, Harmon helped the team to two Sun Belt Tournaments in 2019 and 2020, and one regular-season conference title in 2020. In 2019, he was named Second Team All-Sun Belt.

From 2017 to 2019, Harmon also appeared in the NPSL for Atlanta Silverbacks, who later re-branded at Atlanta SC in 2019.

In 2020, Harmon played with UPSL side Ginga Atlanta, helping the team to spring national title.

=== Professional ===
On May 6, 2021, Harmon signed with USL Championship side Charleston Battery following a successful trial. He made his professional debut on May 14, 2021, appearing as a 69th-minute substitute during a 0–3 defeat to Charlotte Independence. Following the 2022 season, Harmon was released by Charleston.

On March 2, 2023, Harmon signed with USL Championship side Pittsburgh Riverhounds. On January 25, 2024, the Riverhounds announced that Harmon's contract was mutually terminated.

On July 14, 2024, Harmon signed with Championnat National 3, the fifth division of French football, club Entente SSG. Harmon had been training with the club since January, but due to administrative issues, he was unable to play for the club in the second-half of the season. Harmon scored twice on his debut in the 3–2 win over Valenciennes FC B.

== International ==
Following some good performances with the Riverhounds, Harmon was called up to the Liberia national team. On his debut in the 3–1 loss to Ghana, he picked up an assist on Divine Teah's consolation goal in stoppage time.
