= Edward Kizza =

Ugandan footballer (born 1998)

Personal information
- Full name: Edward Kizza
- Date of birth: 17 December 1998 (age 27)
- Place of birth: Kampala, Uganda
- Height: 5 ft 9 in (1.75 m)
- Position: Forward

Team information
- Current team: Indy Eleven
- Number: 19

Youth career
- Montverde Academy

College career
Years	Team	Apps	(Gls)
2017–2019	Pittsburgh Panthers	53	(31)

Senior career*
Years	Team	Apps	(Gls)
2021–2022	New England Revolution	11	(0)
2021	→ New England Revolution II (loan)	12	(5)
2022	→ Memphis 901 (loan)	8	(0)
2022	→ Pittsburgh Riverhounds (loan)	10	(1)
2023–2024	Pittsburgh Riverhounds	62	(16)
2025–	Indy Eleven	68	(9)
- * Club domestic league appearances and goals as of 19:13, 7 November 2026 (UTC)

Edward Kizza (born 17 December 1998) is a Ugandan professional footballer who plays as a forward for Indy Eleven in the USL Championship.

== Career ==
Born in Kampala, Kizza moved to the United States with his parents when he was 14. He spent his first year of high school at Carlisle School before joining the Montverde Academy near Orlando, Florida. With Montverde, Kizza was part of the SIMA program and was ranked as the 41st ranked player nationally by topdrawersoccer coming out of his senior season.

On 17 March 2017, Kizza committed to playing college soccer with the Pittsburgh Panthers, despite looking at offers from the Clemson Tigers and Wake Forest Demon Deacons. He made his collegiate debut for the Panthers on 25 August 2017 against the Ohio State Buckeyes, coming on as a substitute in a 0–1 defeat. He completed his freshman college season with 4 goals in 15 matches, earning an ACC All-Freshman team selection. During his sophomore season, Kizza started in all 18 matches for the Panthers, scoring 15 goals. He then scored 12 goals during his junior and final season with the Panthers, appearing in all 20 matches that season.

On 8 October 2020, it was announced that Kizza had parted ways with the Pittsburgh Panthers, despite appearing and scoring in two exhibition matches. He would go on to not play his senior season with the Panthers.

=== New England Revolution ===
On 21 January 2021, despite not appearing in the 2020 NCAA season, Kizza was selected with the 24th overall pick by the New England Revolution in the MLS SuperDraft. Despite being selected late in the first round of the draft, Revolution head coach Bruce Arena, stated that Kizza is "a proven goal scorer the collegiate level" and that "we feel very fortunate that we got him as late as we did in the first round". Arena said that he had spoken with Kizza's Pittsburgh Panthers coach Jay Vidovich prior to drafting him.

On 5 March 2021, Kizza signed a professional contract with the New England Revolution after impressing the coaching staff in pre-season. He made his professional debut for the Revolution on 17 April 2021 in their season opener against the Chicago Fire, coming on as an 83rd-minute substitute in the 2–2 draw and hitting the crossbar with a header.

Kizza and New England Revolution won the Supporters’ Shield in 2021.

Following the 2022 season, Kizza was released by New England.

==== Memphis 901 (loan) ====
On 30 March 2022, New England announced that they had loaned Kizza to USL Championship club Memphis 901 for the remainder of the 2022 season. Kizza was recalled from his loan in July 2022.

==== Pittsburgh Riverhounds (loan) ====
On 15 July 2022, USL Championship club Pittsburgh Riverhounds SC announced that they had acquired Kizza on loan for the remainder of the 2022 season.

=== Pittsburgh Riverhounds ===
On 13 January 2023, Kizza made his move to the Riverhounds permanent. In a match against Las Vegas Lights FC, Kizza scored a brace in the 4–1 win, as well as Arturo Ordoñez and Danny Griffin scoring.

In 2023, Kizza and the Pittsburgh Riverhounds won the Supporters’ Shield.

Kizza scored 12 goals in 2024 with the Riverhounds.

=== Indy Eleven ===
Kizza joined Indy Eleven on 3 December 2024, becoming the first Ugandan player in club history. He made his debut for the club on 15 March 2025, in a 3–1 victory over Miami FC. Kizza scored his first goal for the club on 5 April 2025, in a 2–2 league draw against North Carolina FC.

== Career statistics ==
As of match played 2 August 2025.

Appearances and goals by club, season and competition
Club	Season	League			Playoffs		Domestic Cup		League Cup		Total	
Club	Season	Division	Apps	Goals	Apps	Goals	Apps	Goals	Apps	Goals	Apps	Goals
New England Revolution	2021	Major League Soccer	11	0	0	0	0	0	—		11	0
New England Revolution II (loan)	2021	USL League One	12	5	—		0	0	—		12	5
Memphis 901 FC (loan)	2022	USL Championship	8	0	0	0	0	0	—		8	0
Pittsburgh Riverhounds SC (loan)	2022	USL Championship	10	1	2	2	0	0	—		12	3
Pittsburgh Riverhounds SC	2023	USL Championship	29	4	1	0	3	1	—		33	5
Pittsburgh Riverhounds SC	2024	USL Championship	33	12	1	0	1	0	—		35	12
Club total			62	16	2	0	4	1	—		68	17
Indy Eleven	2025	USL Championship	17	2	0	0	1	0	3	0	21	2
Career total			120	24	4	2	5	1	3	0	133	27

== Honours ==
New England Revolution

- Supporters' Shield: 2021
- Supporters’ Shield: 2023
