= Jackson Wälti =

American soccer player (born 1999)

Personal information
- Date of birth: December 7, 1999 (age 26)
- Place of birth: St. Augustine, Florida, United States
- Height: 5 ft 10 in (1.78 m)
- Position: Midfielder

Team information
- Current team: Pittsburgh Riverhounds
- Number: 42

Youth career
- 2014–2018: Montverde Academy

College career
Years	Team	Apps	(Gls)
2018–2022	Pittsburgh Panthers	101	(6)

Senior career*
Years	Team	Apps	(Gls)
2023	Austin FC II	12	(0)
2023	Colorado Rapids 2	8	(0)
2024–	Pittsburgh Riverhounds	78	(3)
- * Club domestic league appearances and goals as of October 31, 2026

Jackson Wälti (born December 7, 1999) is an American professional soccer player who plays as a midfielder for the USL Championship club Pittsburgh Riverhounds SC.

== Career ==
=== College ===
Prior to joining the Panthers, Wälti played for Montverde Academy in Florida.

Starting in 2018, Wälti played for Pittsburgh Panthers, playing all 19 games of the season and scoring one goal against NC State Wolfpack. Wälti played 20 games in 2019, also scoring against Duke University. Wälti played every minute of every game in the 2020–21 season, joining teammate Nico Campuzano as the only two players to do that. Wälti scored 1 and assisted 3 that season. In the 2021 season, Wälti scored 1 goal for Pitt in the NCAA men's soccer tournament second round against Northern Illinois. Additionally, Wälti played every game of that season. In 2022, Wälti helped Pittsburgh defeat NC State by scoring his second goal of the season.

On December 21, 2022, Wälti was selected 56th overall in the 2023 MLS SuperDraft by Austin FC.

=== Professional ===
==== Next Pro Teams ====
After the 2022 season with the Panthers, Wälti signed with MLS Next Pro side Austin FC II. However, Wälti would only play 12 games in the first half of the MLS Next Pro season before being transferred to Colorado Rapids 2 in the same league.

Wälti got his first MLS Next Pro assist in the 6–2 victory over Whitecaps FC 2. At the end of the 2023 season, Wälti's option for 2024 was not picked up.

==== Pittsburgh Riverhounds ====
In January 2024, Wälti signed with USL Championship club, Pittsburgh Riverhounds after his 8 appearances with Colorado in the 2023 season. Wälti played his former club, Pittsburgh Panthers, in a preseason game with the Riverhounds, which they won 2–0. Wälti made his official debut in the 1–0 loss away to New Mexico United, which Wälti started. Wälti scored his first professional goal in the 2–2 draw with the Colorado Springs Switchbacks. He scored once again against the Tampa Bay Rowdies, though it would eventually result in a 2–1 loss.

== Personal life ==
Born in St. Augustine, Florida, Wälti spent time living in India, Japan and Brazil, before settling down in Switzerland. Wälti is of Swiss descent through his father and holds dual American and Swiss citizenship.
