= Brunallergene Etou =

Congolese footballer (born 1994)

Personal information
- Full name: Brunallergene Junior Etou
- Date of birth: 1 June 1994 (age 32)
- Place of birth: Brazzaville, Republic of the Congo
- Height: 1.74 m (5 ft 9 in)
- Position: Midfielder

Team information
- Current team: Pittsburgh Riverhounds
- Number: 8

Youth career
- 2012–2013: Drancy

Senior career*
Years	Team	Apps	(Gls)
2012–2017	Drancy	108	(2)
2016–2017	→ Le Havre II (loan)	5	(0)
2017–2018	Monts d'Or Azergues	19	(1)
2018–2019	Béziers	17	(0)
2020–2021	Charlotte Independence	22	(2)
2022	Tampa Bay Rowdies	23	(0)
2023–	Pittsburgh Riverhounds	101	(3)

International career^{‡}
2024–	Congo	1	(0)
- * Club domestic league appearances and goals as of 31 October 2026 ‡ National team caps and goals as of 9 September 2024

Brunallergene Junior Etou (born 1 June 1994) is a Congolese professional footballer who plays as a midfielder for the Congo national team.

== Club career ==
On 22 June 2018, Etou joined Béziers in the Ligue 2 after beginning his career in the amateur divisions of France. Etou made his professional debut with Béziers in a 1–1 (6–5) shootout loss in the Coupe de la Ligue to US Orléans on 14 August 2018.

Etou joined USL Championship side Charlotte Independence on 23 January 2020.

Following Charlotte's self-relegation to USL League One, Etou signed with the Tampa Bay Rowdies on 11 January 2022. He was released by Tampa following their 2022 season.

On 28 February 2023, Etou joined fellow USL Championship side Pittsburgh Riverhounds on a year-long deal with an option for an additional year. Etou scored his first goal in 2 years in a 2-0 win over Charleston Battery. The goal, just 21 seconds into the match, was the fastest in Riverhounds history.

Etou was voted as USL Championship Player of the Week after scoring a brace against Oakland Roots SC.

He became a free agent following Pittsburgh's 2024 season.
