= Southern Soccer Academy =

American soccer team

- Full name: Southern Soccer Academy
- Nickname: SSA Swarm
- Short name: Swarm FC
- Founded: 2012
- Ground: Marathon Park
- Executive Director: Simon Davey
- Head Coaches: Jack Collison USL-M; Jordan Davis USL-W
- League: USL League Two; USL W League
- 2025: 6th. of Southern Conference
- Website: ssaswarm.com
Home colors	Away colors

Southern Soccer Academy Swarm is an American soccer club based in Marietta, Georgia, 20 miles northwest of Atlanta. The club offers youth programs for boys and girls ages 3 through 19, as well as male and female U-20 teams competing in the USL Academy League and U-23 teams competing in the South Central Divisions of the Men's USL League Two and the Women's USL W League Southern Conferences. SSA youth competitive teams participate in MLS Next, Girls Academy League, NAL, DPL, NPL, EDP, and SCCL leagues.

SSA has programs located in Bartow (Cartersville), Cobb (Austell, Kennesaw, Marietta, Powder Springs), Coweta (Newnan, Sharpsburg), Fulton (Buckhead), and Paulding (Dallas) counties in the greater Atlanta area, as well as programs in the Brunswick/Jekyll Island area of Southeast Georgia.

== Record ==
=== Women's team ===
As of July 8, 2026

Season	USL W League								Playoffs
Season	P	W	D	L	GF	GA	Pts	Pos	Playoffs
2022	12	4	5	3	26	22	17	4th, South Central	did not qualify
2023	12	4	2	6	20	18	14	5th, South Central	did not qualify
2024	12	4	4	4	25	17	16	4th, South Central	did not qualify
2025	12	5	2	5	20	14	22	2nd, South Central	did not qualify
2026	10	6	1	3	17	12	19	3rd, South Central	did not qualify
Total	58	23	14	21	108	82	–	–	–
