= Danny Griffin (soccer) =

American soccer player (born 1998)

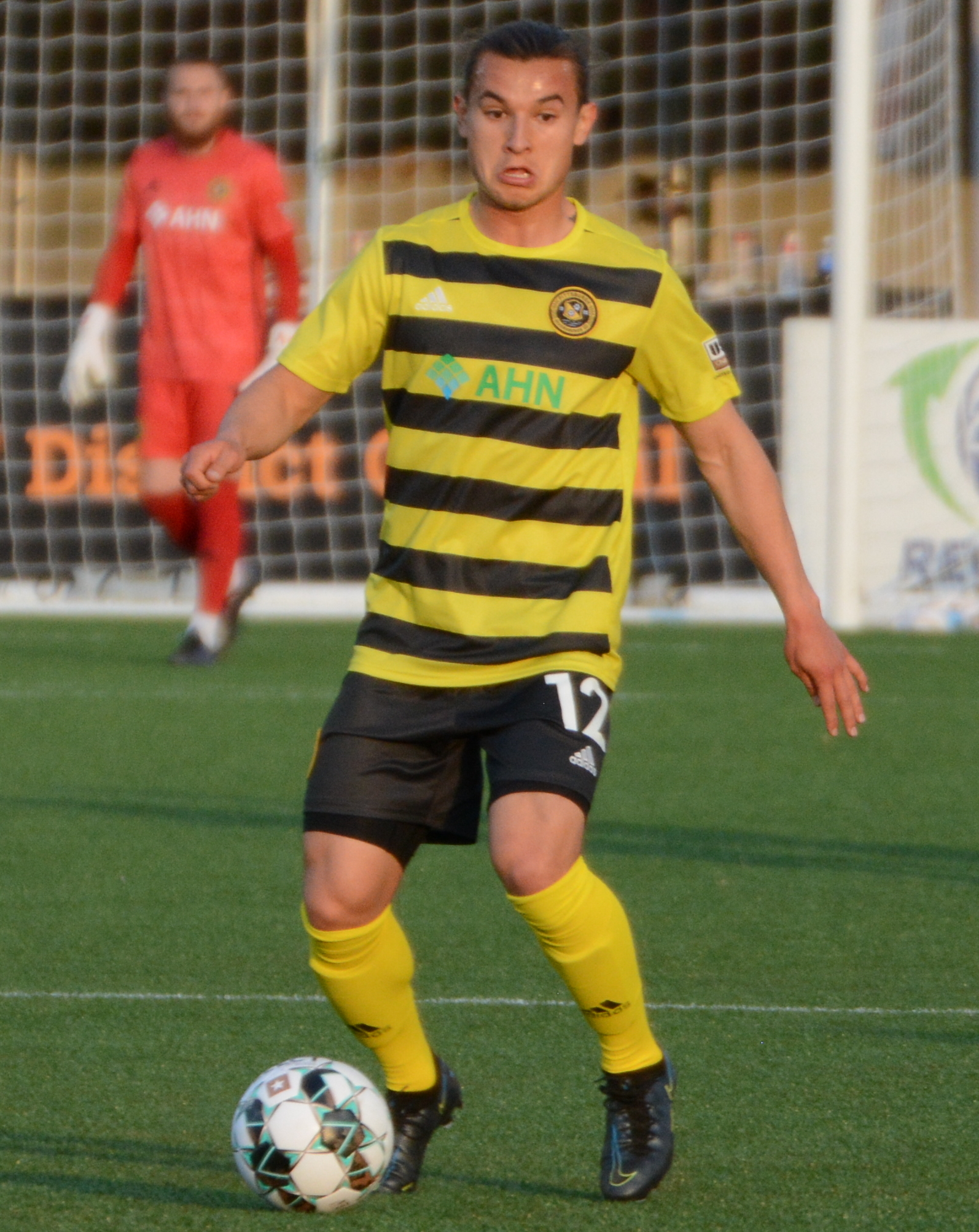
- Griffin with Pittsburgh Riverhounds in 2021

Personal information
- Date of birth: July 14, 1998 (age 28)
- Place of birth: Springfield, Massachusetts, United States
- Height: 5 ft 9 in (1.75 m)
- Position: Attacking midfielder

Team information
- Current team: Pittsburgh Riverhounds
- Number: 2

Youth career
- 2015–2016: Oakwood SC

College career
Years	Team	Apps	(Gls)
2016–2019	Providence Friars	80	(13)

Senior career*
Years	Team	Apps	(Gls)
2020–2022	Pittsburgh Riverhounds	82	(5)
2023	Huntsville City	5	(1)
2023–	Pittsburgh Riverhounds	116	(12)

International career^{‡}
2016	United States U19	2	(0)
- * Club domestic league appearances and goals as of November 7, 2026 ‡ National team caps and goals as of July 12, 2020

Danny Griffin (born July 14, 1998) is an American soccer player who plays as an attacking midfielder for USL Championship club Pittsburgh Riverhounds SC.

== Career ==
=== Youth ===
Griffin played with and captained Oakwood Soccer Club during their 2015–16 season.

=== College ===
Griffin played four years of college soccer at Providence College between 2016 and 2019, where he scored 13 goals and tallied 6 assists in 80 appearances for the Friars. Griffin was named to the USC Division I All-Great Lakes Region Third Team and the Big East All-Freshman Team in 2016 and All-BIG EAST Third Team in 2019.

=== Professional ===
On January 9, 2020, Griffin was selected 49th overall in the 2020 MLS SuperDraft by Columbus Crew SC. However, he was not signed by the team.

Griffin signed his first professional deal with USL Championship club Pittsburgh Riverhounds on March 3, 2020. He made his professional debut on July 12, 2020, appearing as a 67th-minute substitute during a 3–1 win over Louisville City FC. Griffin scored his first professional goal on July 19, 2020, during a 6–0 win over Philadelphia Union II.

On February 6, 2023, it was announced that Griffin had joined MLS Next Pro side Huntsville City FC ahead of their inaugural season. After playing the start of the season with Huntsville, Griffin returned to Pittsburgh for an undisclosed fee.

== Career statistics ==
As of October 20, 2022

Appearances and goals by club, season and competition
Club	Season	League			Playoffs		Cup		Continental		Total	
Club	Season	Division	Apps	Goals	Apps	Goals	Apps	Goals	Apps	Goals	Apps	Goals
Pittsburgh Riverhounds	2020	USL Championship	16	2	1	0	—		—		17	2
Pittsburgh Riverhounds	2021	USL Championship	32	2	—		—		—		32	2
Pittsburgh Riverhounds	2022	USL Championship	34	1	—		1	0	—		35	1
Career total			82	5	1	0	1	0	0	0	84	5
