= Illal Osumanu =

Ghanaian footballer (born 1996)

Abdul Illal Osumanu
Personal information
- Date of birth: 20 August 1996 (age 30)
- Place of birth: Accra, Ghana
- Height: 1.80 m (5 ft 11 in)
- Position: Defender

Team information
- Current team: Pittsburgh Riverhounds
- Number: 28

College career
Years	Team	Apps	(Gls)
2016	Charleston Golden Eagles	17	(1)
2017–2019	Marshall Thundering Herd	59	(2)

Senior career*
Years	Team	Apps	(Gls)
2017	West Virginia Chaos	11	(1)
2018	Michigan Bucks	9	(1)
2019	West Virginia Alliance	6	(1)
2020–2021	Union Omaha	30	(0)
2023–	Pittsburgh Riverhounds	68	(1)
- * Club domestic league appearances and goals as of October 31, 2026

Abdul Illal Osumanu (born 20 August 1996) is a Ghanaian footballer who plays as a defender for Pittsburgh Riverhounds in the USL Championship.

== Career ==
=== College and amateur career ===
Osumanu first attended and played for the Charleston Golden Eagles in 2016. While there he was an instrumental player in a team that won an MEC Championship and played in the NCAA Division II Men's Soccer Championship, overall he made 17 appearances and scored one goal for the team. After his freshman season, he transferred to NCAA Division I school, the Marshall Thundering Herd, a team 45 minutes away from Charleston, West Virginia in Huntington, West Virginia. During his three years at Marshall University, Osumanu played in 59 games and scored two goals. During his senior season, he was an instrumental piece in a historic Marshall side that won the 2019 Conference USA Men's Soccer Tournament and made it to NCAA Division I Men's Soccer Tournament for the first time.

While playing in college, Osumanu further played for two teams in USL League Two, these teams were the West Virginia Chaos, now known as West Virginia Alliance FC, and the Michigan Bucks, now known as the Flint City Bucks. He made a total of 17 appearances for the Chaos, while making a further 9 appearances for the Bucks.

=== Union Omaha ===
On March 2, 2020, it was announced that Osumanu had signed with Union Omaha and would begin his professional career with the club. After joining the club prior to the 2020 season, Osumanu made his debut for the club on 25 July 2020 against New England Revolution II.

Osumanu was a key contributor in Omaha's inaugural season, playing in 15 out of a 16 possible matches for the club. He started 14 of these matches helping the club to the 2020 USL League One Championship game, however, this match was cancelled due to a COVID-19 outbreak among Omaha's team. On December 3, 2020, Omaha announced that Osumanu would remain with the club for the 2021 USL League One season.

=== Pittsburgh Riverhounds ===
On 5 April 2023, Osumanu signed a one-year deal with USL Championship side Pittsburgh Riverhounds. After waiting 3 months before his first appearance, Osumanu would get into the Team of the Week after scoring a goal to win the Riverhounds the match against San Diego Loyal SC, 2–1.

== Career statistics ==
Clubs	Season	League			U.S. Open Cup		Other		Total	
Clubs	Season	Division	Apps	Goals	Apps	Goals	Apps	Goals	Apps	Goals
West Virginia Chaos	2017	USL League Two	11	0	–		–		11	0
Michigan Bucks	2018	USL League Two	9	1	1	0	–		10	1
West Virginia Alliance FC	2019	USL League Two	6	1	–		–		6	1
Union Omaha	2020	USL League One	15	0	–		0	0	15	0
Union Omaha	2021	USL League One	5	0	0	0	0	0	5	0
Union Omaha	Total		20	0	0	0	0	0	20	0
Career Total			46	2	1	0	0	0	47	2

== Personal ==
On 2 June 2021, Osumanu was named among nine people in an indictment charging them with defrauding 200 people out of at least $2.5 million. Osumanu was charged with six counts; two mail fraud charges, two wire-fraud charges, one money-laundering charge, and a charge of receiving stolen money. Osumanu is alleged to have “participated in a series of romance and other online scams designed to coerce vulnerable victims into sending money to various bank accounts controlled by them".
