= Pittsburgh Riverhounds SC =

American professional soccer club based in Pittsburgh

- Full name: Pittsburgh Riverhounds Soccer Club
- Nickname: The Hounds
- Founded: March 11, 1998; 28 years ago
- Stadium: F.N.B. Stadium; Pittsburgh, Pennsylvania
- Capacity: 5,000
- Owner: Tuffy Shallenberger
- Head coach: Rob Vincent
- League: USL Championship
- 2025: 4th, Eastern Conference; Playoffs: Champions
- Website: riverhounds.com
| Home colors | Away colors |

Pittsburgh Riverhounds SC is an American professional soccer team based in Pittsburgh, Pennsylvania. Founded in 1998 and beginning play in 1999, the club plays in the Eastern Conference of the USL Championship, the second tier of the American soccer pyramid. Since 2013, the Riverhounds have played their home games at the 5,000-seat F.N.B. Stadium, a soccer-specific stadium located in Station Square. Their current head coach is Rob Vincent. Saint Lucian international David Flavius currently holds the club records for most appearances and goals which he set over his eight seasons with the Riverhounds between 1999 and 2006.

The Riverhounds have an affiliated women's soccer team, Pittsburgh Riveters SC, that plays in the USL W League.

== History ==
An ownership group led by local banker Paul Heasley was awarded a Pittsburgh expansion franchise in the USL A-League by USISL on March 11, 1998. Organizers planned for the team to begin play in the 1999 season, making it the first professional outdoor soccer team in the city since the Pittsburgh Phantoms folded after the 1967 NPSL season. The name "Riverdogs" was initially selected until the threat of legal action by the Charleston RiverDogs led the team to change their name to the Pittsburgh Riverhounds in December 1998.

The Riverhounds played their first match on May 1, 1999, against the Cincinnati Riverhawks at Bethel Park Stadium in Bethel Park, Pennsylvania. The team lost 3–2 in a penalty shootout after a scoreless draw in front of a sellout crowd of 5,639 spectators. Pittsburgh drew an average attendance of 4,178 in their inaugural season—the second-best in the league—and qualified for the A-League playoffs, where the Rochester Rhinos eliminated them in the second round. The team's attendance declined in later seasons as Heasley unsuccessfully pursued plans for a soccer-specific stadium to replace Bethel Park by 2005. The Riverhounds moved a tier below the A-League (later the USL First Division) to the USL Pro Soccer League (later the Second Division) in 2004 amid financial issues. The team underwent several ownership changes and continued to have unstable finances; it withdrew from competition for the 2007 season but continued to run its youth programs and the senior team returned the following year.

In April 2013, the team opened Highmark Stadium in Pittsburgh with an initial capacity of 3,102 seats and plans for future expansions. The stadium cost $10.2 million to construct, entirely with private contributions, and was the result of several design and location changes. The Riverhounds successfully drew larger crowds at their new stadium and averaged 3,273 spectators during the 2013 season. The remaining financial issues and debts incurred from stadium construction caused the team to file for Chapter 11 bankruptcy in March 2014, but it continued to play. Tuffy Shallenberger, a construction company owner and member of the ownership group, acquired majority ownership of the team and shifted its focus toward expanding its youth academy business. The Riverhounds unveiled a new crest and identity in 2018, replacing a cartoon dog with a modern roundel, and expanded Highmark Stadium to 5,000 seats.

The Riverhounds continued competing in the USL's third-division league as it evolved into USL Pro and later the USL Championship after receiving second-division sanctioning. In 2013, the team announced a plan to join Major League Soccer, the country's top-flight league, within the next decade as an expansion franchise. The plan would require further expansion of Highmark Stadium to meet the league's minimum seating capacity of 18,000. The Riverhounds have never submitted a formal bid for an MLS franchise during previous rounds of expansion.

The organization announced in 2024 that they would form a women's team, later named Pittsburgh Riveters SC, to play in the pre-professional USL W League the following year. Former academy director Scott Gibson was named as the team's head coach.

On November 22, 2025, the Riverhounds won the first USL title in the club's history after defeating FC Tulsa in penalty kicks.

== Colors and badge ==
Initially, the Riverhounds' colors were predominantly red with smaller amounts of black and white. Pittsburgh-based BD&E designed the original logo. The firm made a strategic decision not to make the club's colors black and gold. The choice meant the Hounds would not align with the region's established professional sports identity but would allow the soccer fans' jerseys to stand out in a Pittsburgh crowd. The club adopted new colors, predominantly blue with white and black added, before the start of the 2008 season to honor their academy and training partnership with Everton. The use of blue was also an allusion to the blue collar populace of Pittsburgh. Beginning in 2014, the Riverhounds began wearing black and gold uniforms more regularly, aligning the club with the colors representative of Pittsburgh's other professional sports teams. The team continued to wear blue and black kits as their alternate third kit.

On February 16, 2018, the Riverhounds unveiled a new crest as part of its rebranding. The new crest incorporates traditional Pittsburgh sports colors with essential symbols of the city such as bridges and rivers. Oregon-based graphic designer Brian Gundell designed the crest.

=== Kit history ===
Home, away, and third kits.

- Home

| 1999–00 | 2001–04 | 2005–06 | 2008–10 | 2011 | 2012 | 2013–14 | 2015 | 2016 |

| 2017 | 2018–20 | 2020–21 | 2022–23 | 2024 | 2025 | 2026 |

- Away

| 1999–00 | 2001–04 | 2005–06 | 2008–10 | 2011 | 2012 | 2013–14 | 2015–16 | 2017 |

| 2018 | 2019 | 2020–21 | 2022 | 2023 | 2024 | 2025 | 2026 |

- Third

| 2013 | 2015 | 2018 | 2022 | 2023 | 2024 | 2025 | 2026 |

=== Sponsorship ===
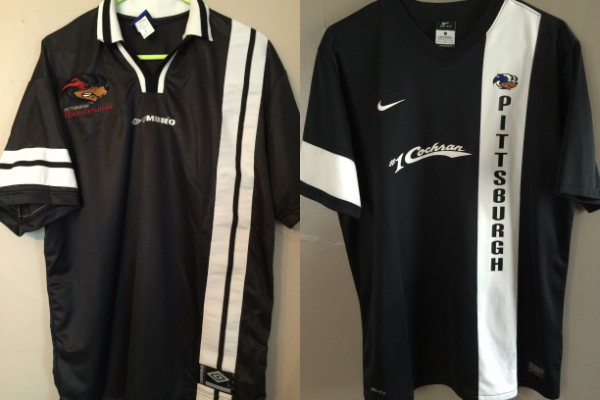
Very early Riverhounds kit by Umbro (left) and 2013/2014 secondary kit by Nike (right)

| Period | Kit manufacturer | Shirt sponsor |
|---|---|---|
| 1999–2000 | Umbro | — |
| 2001–2004 | Adidas | — |
| 2005–2006 | Select | Toyota |
| 2008–2010 | Select | ACES, Inc. |
| 2011–2012 | Umbro | #1 Cochran |
| 2013–2014 | Nike | #1 Cochran |
| 2015–2017 | Nike | AHN |
| 2018–2021 | Adidas | AHN |
| 2022–2023 | Adidas | AHN (home); 84 Lumber (away) |
| 2024–2025 | Charly | AHN (home); 84 Lumber (away) |
| 2026 - present | Hummel | AHN (home); 84 Lumber; Boys & Girls Clubs (third) |

== Stadium ==
Pittsburgh Riverhounds SC has played at F.N.B. Stadium, a 5,000-seat soccer-specific stadium in Station Square, since 2013. The stadium is owned and operated by the Riverhounds organization.

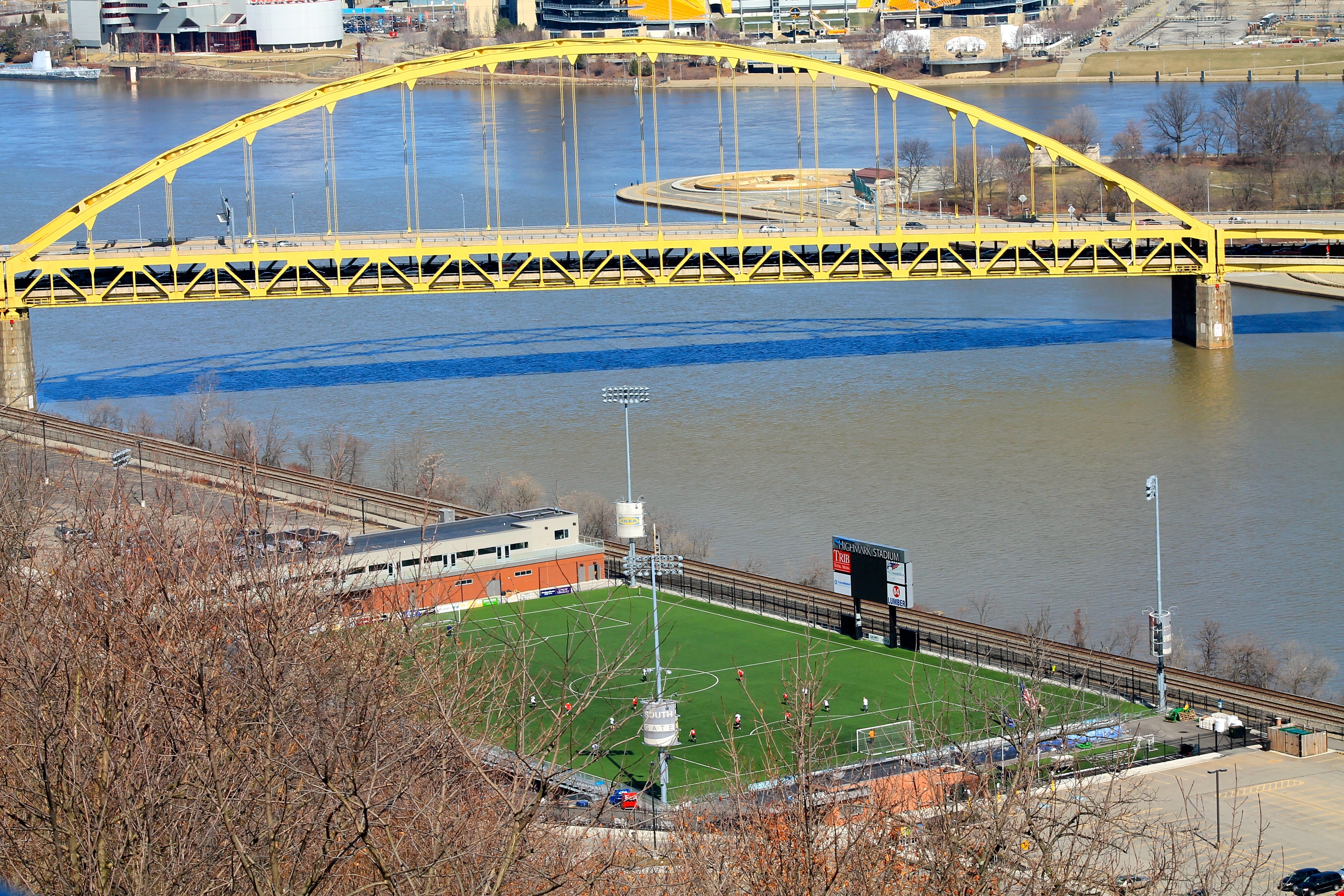
FNB Stadium as seen from Mount Washington

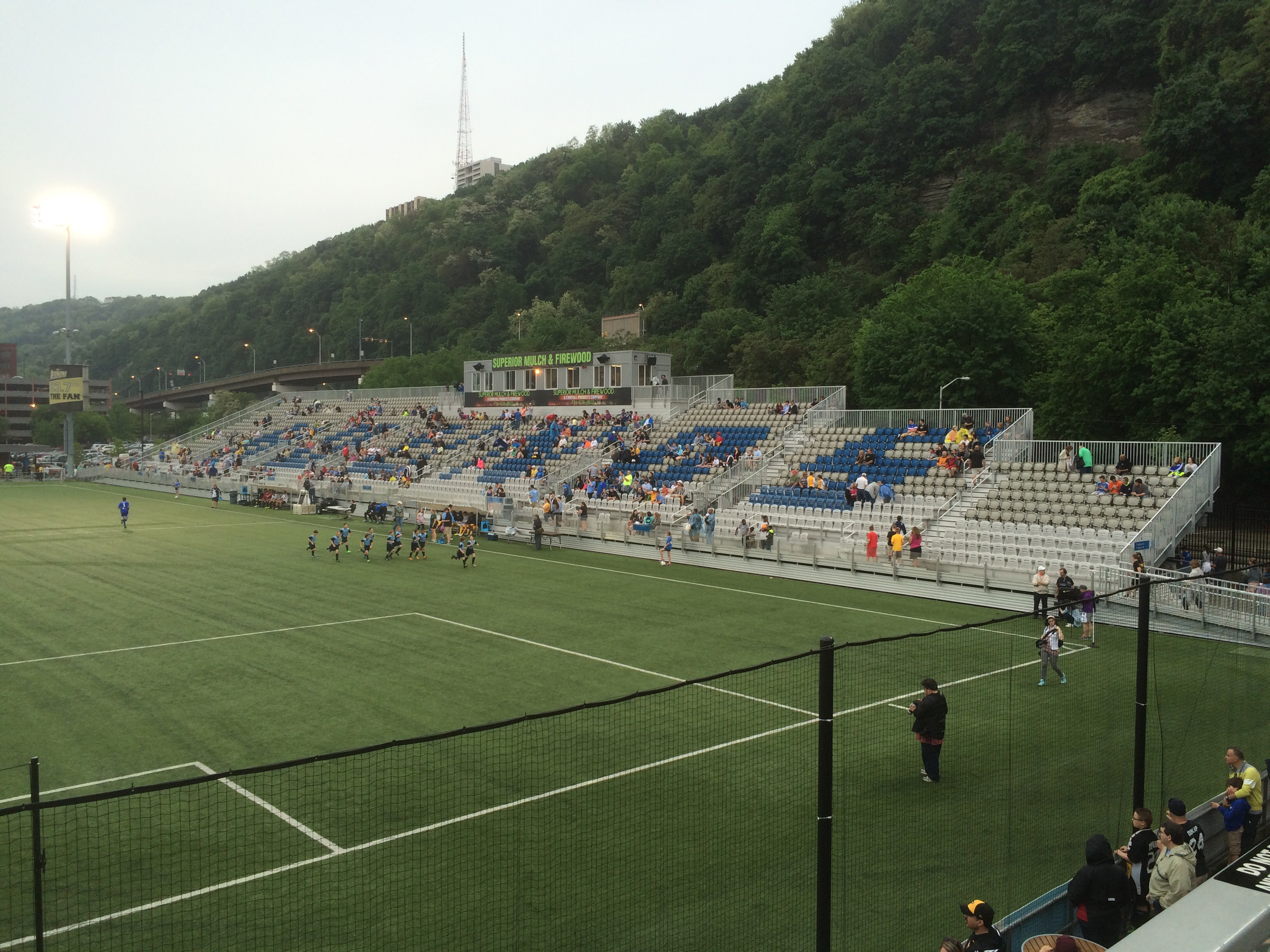
FNB Stadium main stand

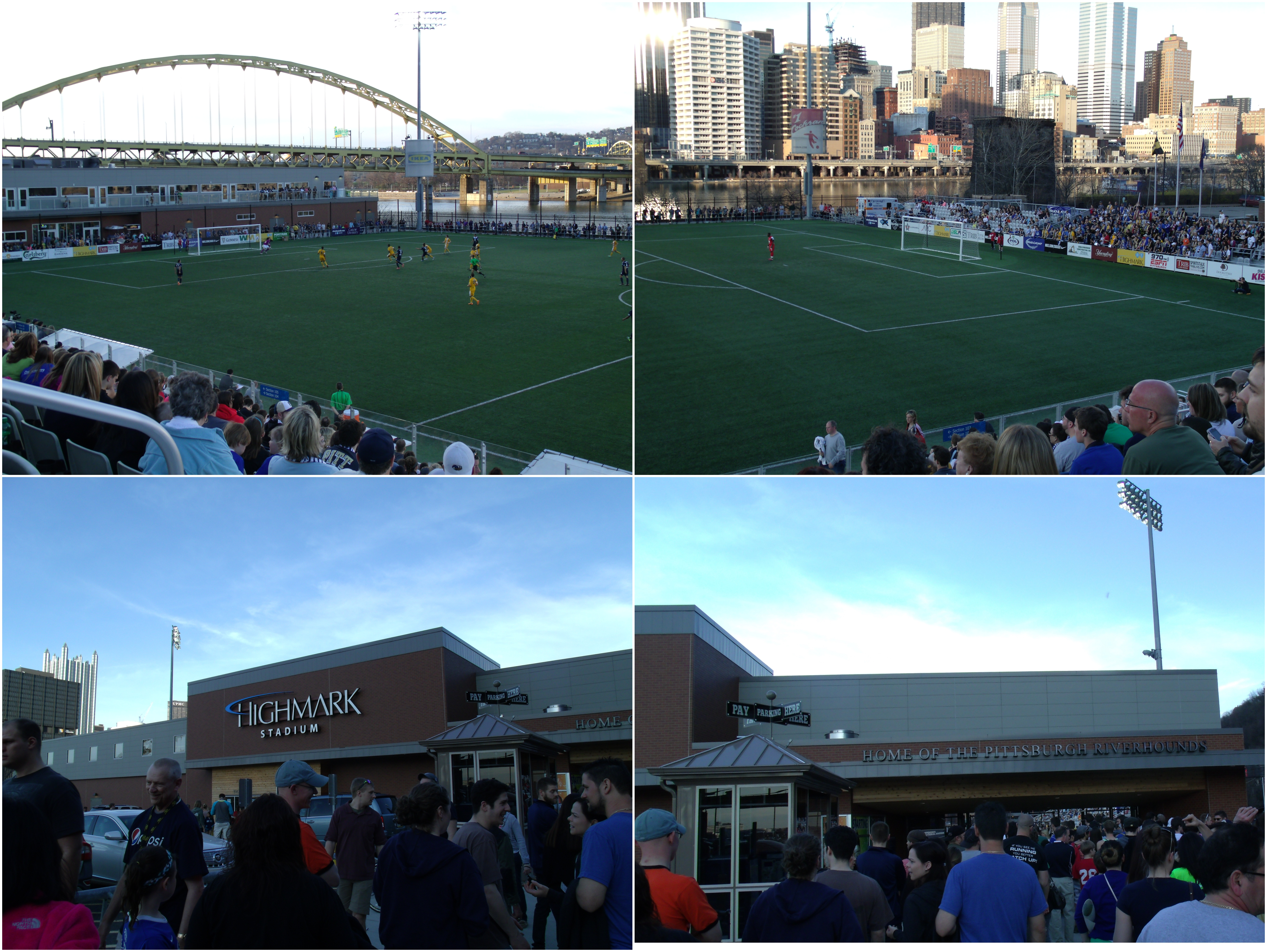
FNB Stadium

== Supporters ==
AMO is the official mascot of the Pittsburgh Riverhounds. He was named after Pittsburgh's three rivers: the Allegheny, Monongahela, and Ohio, symbolizing the city's spirit and connection to its waterways. He wears the number 99 on his jersey to honor the year the Pittsburgh Riverhounds were founded.

In November 2007, supporters formed the first Pittsburgh Riverhounds fan group, known as the Steel Army. The Steel Army held their first meeting at Piper's Pub in Pittsburgh's South Side. The group started as 5–10 local people interested in supporting the reorganized Riverhounds Soccer Club and in supporting the efforts of growing the sport of soccer in Western Pennsylvania as well.

Members are from Pittsburgh and nearby states like Ohio and distant states such as Oregon and Florida. Membership in the Steel Army is also international. Members have joined from Portsmouth, Sunderland, Surrey and Derbyshire in the U.K., Bray in the Republic of Ireland, and Rio de Janeiro in Brazil.

The Steel Army supports the Riverhounds from the South Gate end of the F.N.B. Stadium. The terrace there holds 1,000 supporters. On August 1, 2015, the supporters' section was renamed the Paul Child Stand in honor of Pittsburgh soccer legend Paul Child. The Steel Army had fierce rivalries with United Soccer League clubs Rochester Rhinos (Oak Street Brigade) before the club moved to USL League One.

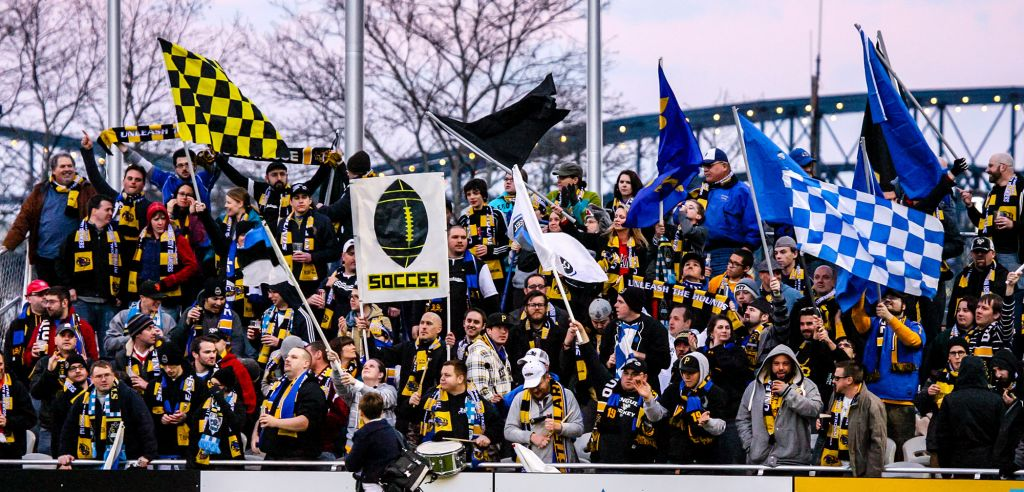
Steel Army during the first match at FNB Stadium

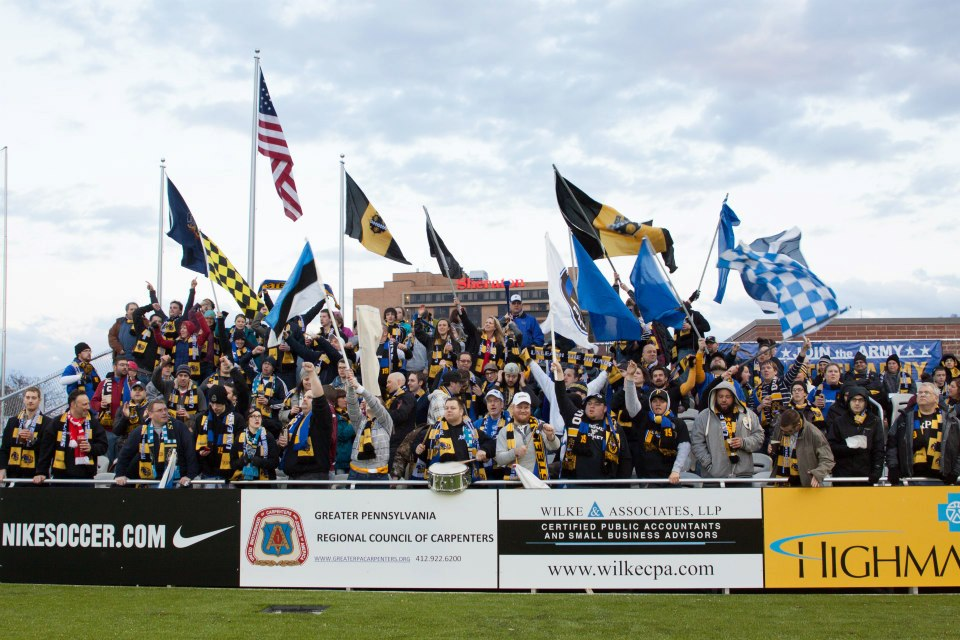
Steel Army in 2013

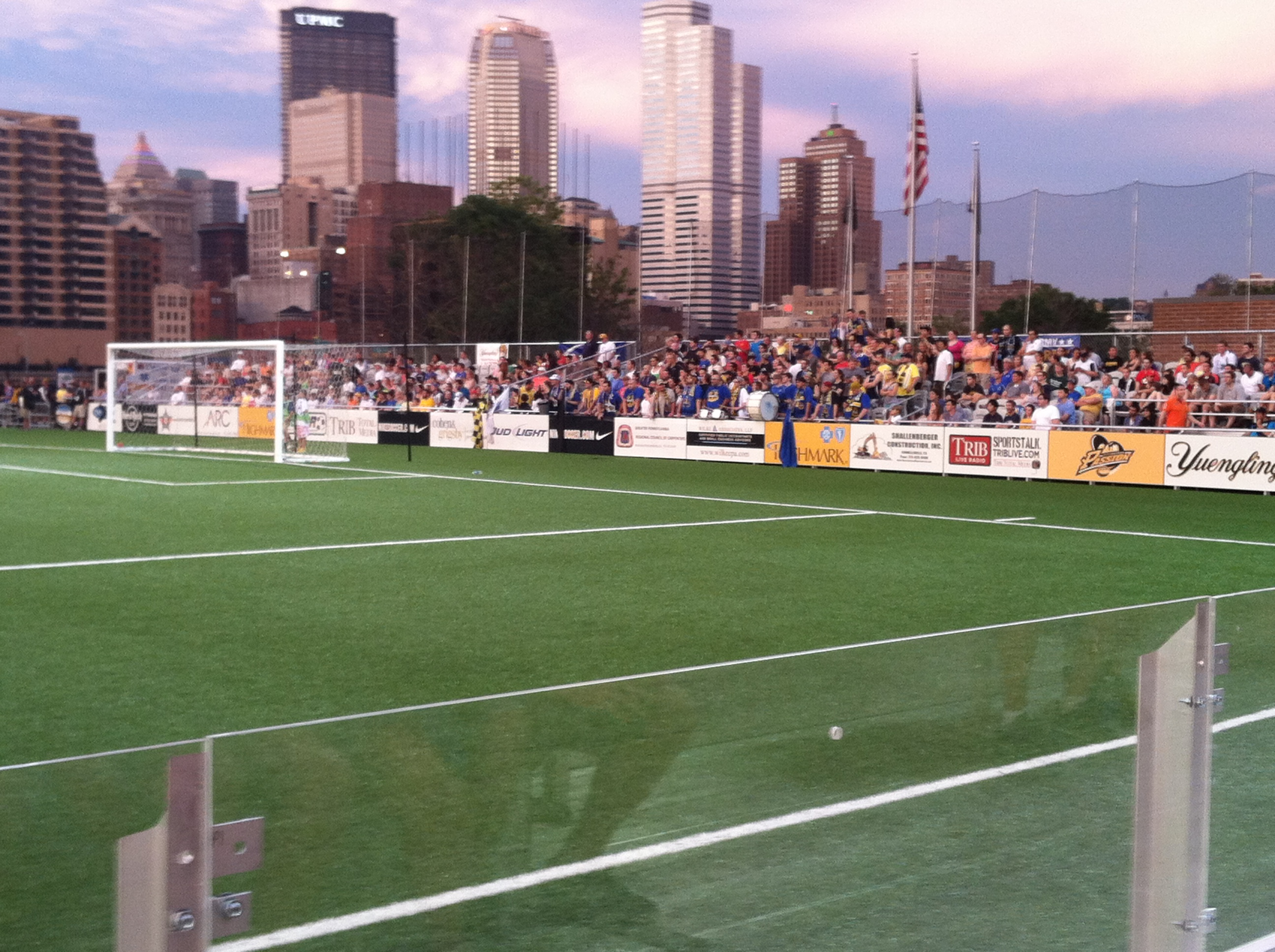
Steel Army during friendly with Wigan Athletic

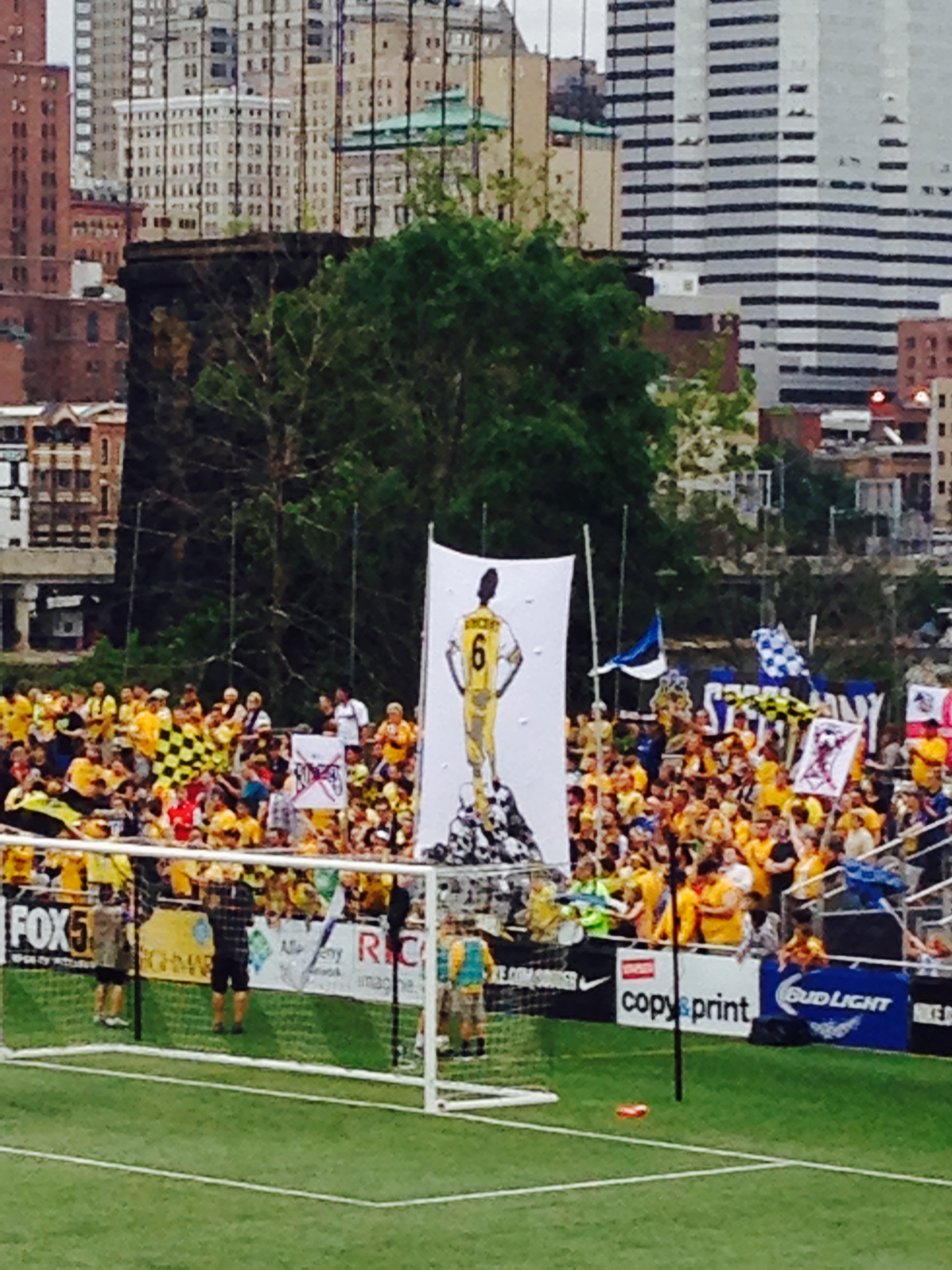
Rob Vincent tifo during 2015 US Open Cup

== Players and staff ==
=== Current roster ===
As of March 3, 2026

Note: Flags indicate national team as defined under FIFA eligibility rules; some limited exceptions apply. Players may hold more than one non-FIFA nationality.

| No. | Pos. | Nation | Player |
|---|---|---|---|
| 1 | GK | ESP | Nico Campuzano |
| 2 | MF | USA | Danny Griffin |
| 3 | DF | USA | Perrin Barnes |
| 4 | DF | GER | Lasse Kelp |
| 5 | DF | USA | Victor Souza |
| 6 | DF | USA | Owen Mikoy |
| 7 | FW | USA | Trevor Amann |
| 8 | DF | CGO | Junior Etou |
| 9 | FW | CMR | Albert Dikwa |
| 10 | MF | USA | Charles Ahl |
| 13 | MF | USA | Max Viera |
| 14 | MF | USA | Robbie Mertz |
| 15 | MF | USA | Bradley Sample |

| No. | Pos. | Nation | Player |
|---|---|---|---|
| 16 | DF | PUR | Beto Ydrach |
| 17 | FW | NOR | Brigham Larsen |
| 18 | MF | USA | Jorge Garcia |
| 19 | MF | USA | Sam Bassett |
| 20 | GK | USA | Mitch Budler |
| 22 | MF | USA | Warren Agostini |
| 23 | DF | FRA | Guillaume Vacter |
| 24 | GK | USA | Mike Sheridan |
| 27 | FW | USA | Aldi Flowers-Gamboa |
| 28 | DF | GHA | Illal Osumanu |
| 37 | MF | ENG | Eliot Goldthorp |
| 42 | MF | USA | Jackson Wälti |

1. USL Academy Contract

=== Team management ===
Front Office
| Owner | Terrance "Tuffy" Shallenberger |
| President | Jeff Garner |
Coaching Staff
| Head Coach | Rob Vincent |
| Goalkeeping Coach | Jon Busch |
| Sporting Director | Dan Visser |
Riverhounds Development Academy
| Academy Director | Scott Gibson |
| Academy East Director | James Meara |
| Director of Goalkeeping | Jon Busch |

Last updated: December 22, 2025

== Honors ==
=== Team ===
| Competitions | Titles | Seasons |
| USL Championship Title | 1 | 2025 |
| Players' Shield | 1 | 2023 |
| Eastern Conference (Playoffs) | 1 | 2025 |
| Eastern Conference (Regular Season) | 2 | 2019, 2023 |
| Atlantic Division | 1 | 2004 |

=== Players ===
| Honor | Player Name | Season |
|---|---|---|
| USL Championship Most Valuable Player | José Angulo | 2013 |
| USL Championship Most Valuable Player | Albert Dikwa | 2023 |
| USL Championship Golden Boot | Albert Dikwa | 2023 |
| USL Golden Glove | Danny Vitiello | 2020 |
| USL Golden Glove | Eric Dick | 2024 |
| USL Championship Defender of the Year Award | Joseph Greenspan | 2019 |
| USL Championship Defender of the Year Award | Arturo Ordoñez | 2023 |
| USL Championship Goalkeeper of the Year | Eric Dick | 2024 |

=== Head coach ===
| Honor | Head coach Name | Season |
|---|---|---|
| USL Championship Coach of the Year | Bob Lilley | 2023 |

== Record ==
The following is a summary of the Riverhounds' most recently completed five seasons. For the full season-by-season history, see List of Pittsburgh Riverhounds SC seasons.

| Season | League | | | | | | | | | | | Position | | Playoffs | USOC | USL Cup | Continental | Average attendance | Top goalscorer(s) | |
| Season | Div | League | Pld | W | L | D | GF | GA | GD | Pts | PPG | Conf. | Overall | Playoffs | USOC | USL Cup | Continental | Average attendance | Name | Goals |
|---|---|---|---|---|---|---|---|---|---|---|---|---|---|---|---|---|---|---|---|---|
| 2022 | 2 | USLC | 34 | 16 | 9 | 9 | 50 | 38 | +12 | 57 | 1.32 | 5th | 7th | QF | R3 | Inexistent | DNQ | 3,934 | (United States) Russell Cicerone | 13 |
| 2023 | 2 | USLC | 34 | 19 | 5 | 10 | 50 | 29 | +21 | 67 | 1.47 | 1st | 1st | R1 | QF | Inexistent | DNQ | 5,077 | (Cameroon) Albert Dikwa | 20 ♦ |
| 2024 | 2 | USLC | 34 | 12 | 10 | 12 | 41 | 28 | +13 | 48 | 1.41 | 7th | 12th | R1 | Ro32 | Ineligible | DNQ | 5,089 | (Uganda) Edward Kizza | 12 |
| 2025 | 2 | USLC | 30 | 12 | 10 | 8 | 32 | 28 | +4 | 44 | 1.46 | 4th | 7th | W | Ro16 | GS | DNQ | 4,965 | (Sierra Leone) Augustine Williams | 9 |
| 2026 | 2 | USLC | 30 | 13 | 11 | 6 | 33 | 30 | +3 | 45 | 1.50 | 5th | 10th | R1 | Ro32 | GS | DNQ | 4,995 | (United States) Trevor Amann | 13 |

1. Avg. attendance include statistics from league matches only.
2. Top goalscorer(s) includes all goals scored in league, league playoffs, U.S. Open Cup, CONCACAF Champions League, FIFA Club World Cup, and other competitive continental matches.

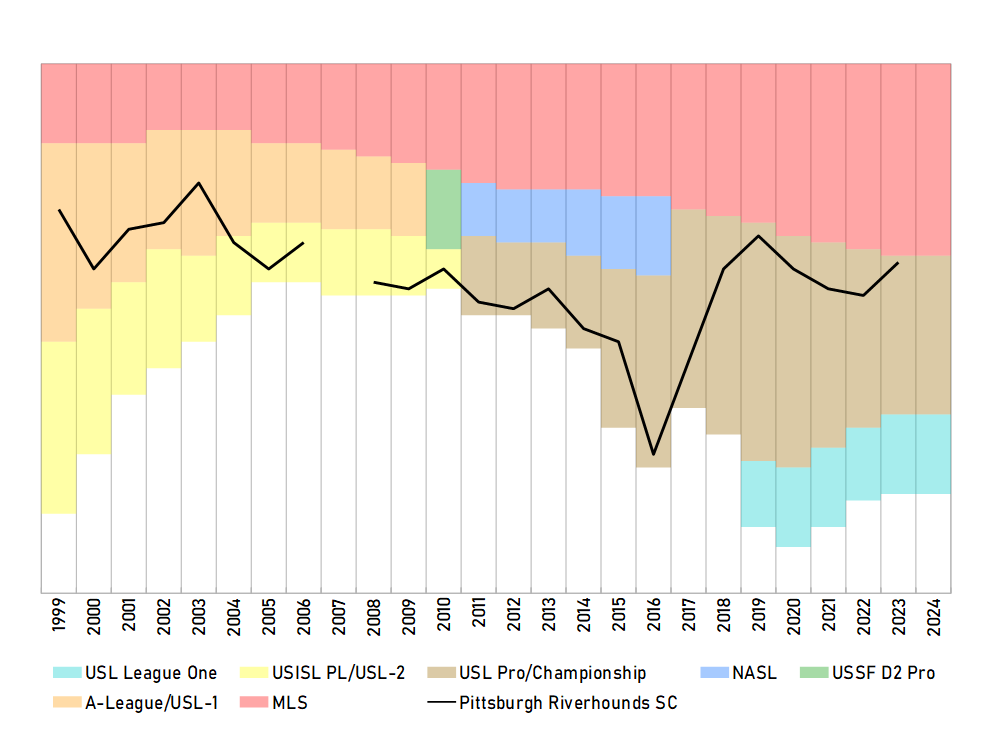
Historical chart of the Riverhounds' regular season performance

== See also ==
- Pittsburgh Riverhounds SC records and results
- History of Pittsburgh Riverhounds SC
- Pittsburgh Riverhounds 2
