= El Clamico =

Soccer rivalry between Hartford Athletic and Rhode Island FC

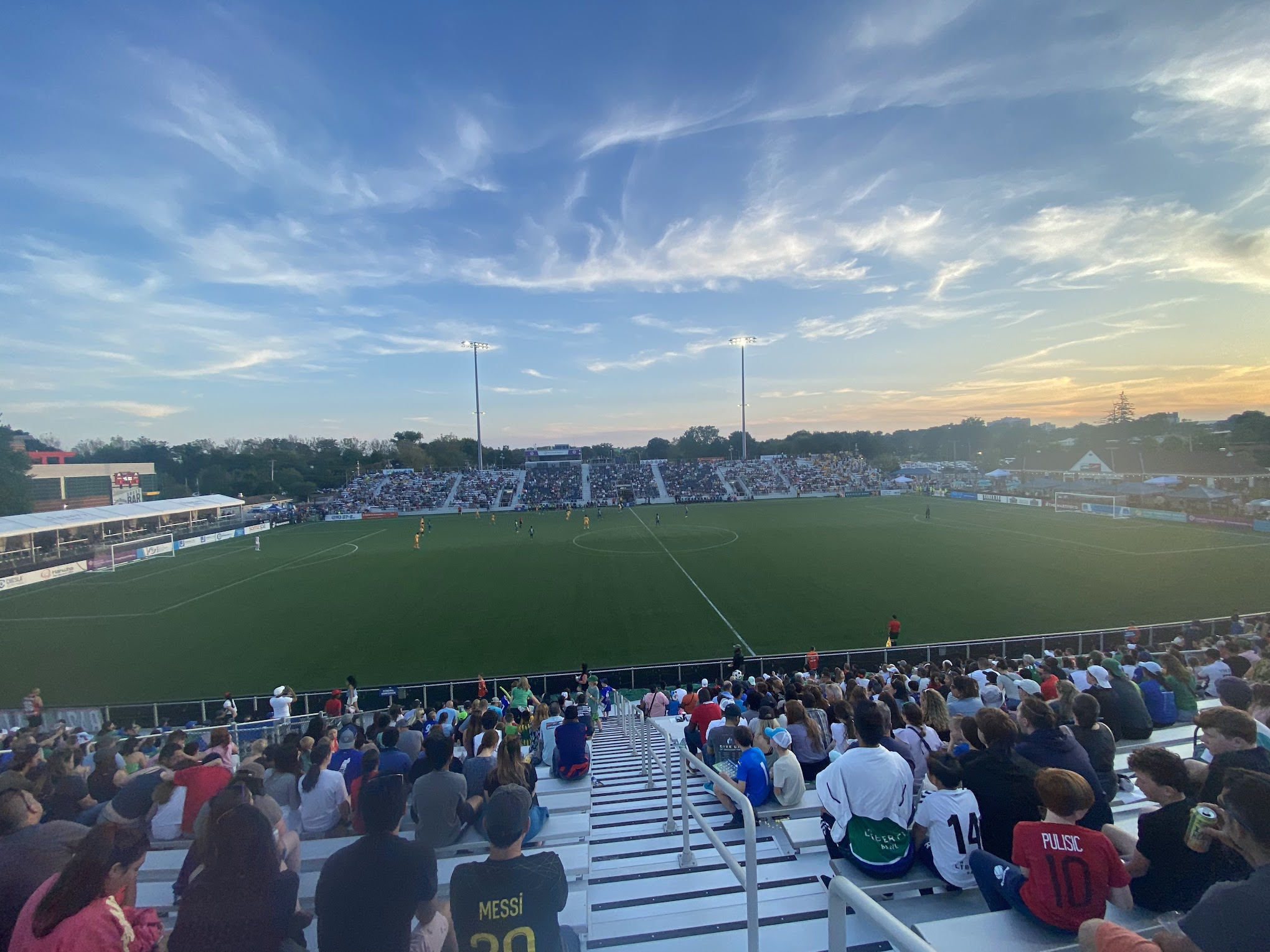
- Inaugural Match between Hartford and Rhode Island at Trinity Health Stadium
- Other names: Route 6 Derby
- Location: New England
- Teams: Hartford Athletic; Rhode Island FC
- First meeting: June 1, 2024; USLC regular season Hartford 1–1 Rhode Island
- Latest meeting: October 24, 2026; USLC Regular season Hartford 2–1 Rhode Island
- Stadiums: Beirne Stadium (Rhode Island); Trinity Health Stadium (Hartford); Centreville Bank Stadium (Rhode Island)

Statistics
- Total meetings: 9
- Most wins: Rhode Island (3); Penalty Shootouts: Tied (1)
- Top scorer: Frank Nodarse (2)
- All-time series: Hartford: 2 Draw: 4 Rhode Island: 3
- Largest victory: Rhode Island 3–0 Hartford (August 10, 2024); Hartford 3–0 Rhode Island (August 23, 2025)

El Clamico is a soccer rivalry between two United Soccer League (USL) clubs based in New England, Hartford Athletic and Rhode Island FC. Currently, both clubs play in the USL Championship, the highest tier in the USL system. Originally stemming from proximity, El Clamico has quickly grown into a genuine rivalry between the two clubs.

== Background ==
Soccer in the United States has strong roots in New England area, with the Oneida Football Club in Boston being the first organized American sports club to play soccer, dating back to 1862. In Connecticut and Rhode Island, both states have a rich history of soccer. Pawtucket, Rhode Island hosted the first National Challenge Cup final in 1914, which evolved into the modern U.S. Open Cup. Pawtucket-based teams made Cup finals four times, including the Pawtucket FC team winning the 1941 championship.

Later in the 20th century, the Connecticut Bicentennials (based in Hartford) and the New England Tea Men (based in Providence) both competed in the North American Soccer League during the 70s, albeit never competing against one another. A predecessor of El Clamico existed in the second edition of the American Soccer League, where the Connecticut Yankees and the Rhode Island Oceaneers competed against each other from 1974 to 1977.

The United Soccer League first came to New England in July 2018, bringing what would become Hartford Athletic into Dillon Stadium, where the Yankees played. The next year, USL announced a new expansion franchise in Rhode Island, which ultimately became Rhode Island FC. RIFC began play in 2024, and opened Centreville Bank Stadium as their home in 2025.

== History ==
The first ever match in the series was on June 1, 2024 in Hartford in front of sold-out crowd of 5,500 fans. Rhode Island's Mark Doyle scored the first goal in the 4th minute of the game. Joe Farrell of Hartford would counter right back at the 24th minute, with the game concluding 1–1 draw. The second 2024 USL Championship season matchup was played at the home stadium of Bryant University's football stadium, Beirne Stadium in Smithfield, Rhode Island. RIFC would go on to beat Hartford 3–0, securing the 2024 season series with one win, one draw, and no losses. In the Eastern Conference standings, Hartford would finish the season in 10th place and out of a playoff spot, whilst Rhode Island finished 5th and ultimately became Eastern Conference Champions of the 2024 USL Championship playoffs.

The first 2025 USL Championship season matchup between the two clubs was played on July 19 in Rhode Island's new stadium, Centreville Bank Stadium, in front of 10,619 fans on national television. The game would end in a 0–0 draw with a 36 combined fouls and twelve minutes of second-half stoppage. The following week the two would play again in the 2025 USL Cup, where Hartford won via penalty shoot-out 4–3, after a 2–2 draw. On the 23rd, Hartford beat RIFC 3–0, finishing the 2025 season series with one win, two draws, and a victory in their penalty shoot-out.

== Fan activities ==
From the first meeting between the two clubs, fans of Hartford and Rhode Island have had incidents against one another. During the first meeting between the two clubs, reports that a banner owned by visiting Defiance 1636, the supporter's group of Rhode Island FC, was stolen in Hartford. The following match later in the 2024 USL Championship season saw a travelling Hartford Athletic fan set off a firework in the stands of Beirne Stadium, the first stadium of Rhode Island FC. The following season saw animosity between the two fans of the clubs continue. Following the first match in Pawtucket, a member of the Bonzana, the supporters group of Hartford Athletic, was assaulted by a Rhode Island fan when returning to a Hartford Athletic chartered bus to Hartford.

== Moniker ==
The name "El Clamico" comes from a play on the El Clásico derby in La Liga. Originally, when the teams first matched up in June 2024, a fan contest was in the process of determining the name of the derby. One of the names gathered was the Route 6 Derby, named after U.S. Route 6, which passes through both Connecticut and Rhode Island. By their second matchup of the year in August, fans settled on the name El Clamico. The name takes the El Clasico name and tweaks it to reference to clam chowder and clam digging, two important aspects of Southern New England culture.

== Results ==
Hartford Athletic victories	Rhode Island FC victories	Draw

No.	Date	Location	Winner	Score	Penalty Shootout
1	June 1, 2024	Hartford, Connecticut	Tie	1–1	
2	August 10, 2024	Smithfield, Rhode Island	Rhode Island FC	3–0	
3	July 19, 2025	Pawtucket, Rhode Island	Tie	0–0	
4	July 26, 2025	Pawtucket, Rhode Island	Tie	2–2	RIFC 3–4 HFD
5	August 23, 2025	Hartford, Connecticut	Hartford Athletic	3–0	
6	April 1, 2026	Pawtucket, Rhode Island	Rhode Island FC	2–0	
7	April 25, 2026	Hartford, Connecticut	Tie	0–0	HFD 3–4 RIFC
8	July 18, 2026	Pawtucket, Rhode Island	Rhode Island FC	1–0	
9	October 24, 2026	Hartford, Connecticut	Hartford Athletic	2–1	
Series: Rhode Island FC leads 3–2–4

=== Match Results ===
Home team is listed on the left, away team is listed on the right. Home team's score is listed first.

Rhode Island win Hartford win Draw

June 1, 2024 USLC	Hartford Athletic	1–1	Rhode Island FC	Hartford, CT
4:00 PM EDT	Farrell 24'	Report	Doyle 4' (yellow card) 86'	Stadium: Trinity Health Stadium; Attendance: 5,500; Referee: Luis Arroyo

August 10, 2024 USLC	Rhode Island FC	3–0	Hartford Athletic	Smithfield, RI
7:30 PM EDT	Holstad (yellow card) 22'; Stoneman 29'; Nodarse 49'; Fuson (yellow card) 52'; Yao (yellow card) 76'; Brito 90+1'	Report	Farrell (yellow card) 66'; Samadia (yellow card) 69'; Boudadi (yellow card) 77'	Stadium: Beirne Stadium; Attendance: 5,252; Referee: Joshua Encarnación

July 19, 2025 USLC	Rhode Island FC	0–0	Hartford Athletic	Pawtucket, RI
7:30 PM EDT	Ybarra (yellow card) 7'; Shapiro-Thompson (yellow card) 45+5'; Bacharach (yellow card) 86'; Kwizera (yellow card) 90+8'; Yao (yellow card) 90+9'	Report	Samadia (yellow card) 19'; Dieng (yellow card) 51'; Hairston (yellow card) 90+11'; Siaha (yellow card) 90+12'	Stadium: Centreville Bank Stadium; Attendance: 10,619; Referee: Jeremy Scheer

July 26, 2025 USL Cup	Rhode Island FC	2–2 (3–4 p)	Hartford Athletic	Pawtucket, RI
7:30 PM EDT	Fuson (yellow card) 11'; Shapiro-Thompson 49'; Holstad (yellow card) 56'; Rodriguez (yellow card) 71' (goal) 79' (pen.)	Report	Makangila (yellow card) 22' (yellow-red card) 28'; T. Presthus 45+3'; Farrell (yellow card) 64'; Siaha (yellow card) 78'; Diz 83'	Stadium: Centreville Bank Stadium; Attendance: 7,242; Referee: Brandon Stevis
	Penalties
	Rodriguez (penalty scored); Fuson (penalty scored); Ybarra (penalty missed); Dikwa (penalty scored); Sanchez (penalty missed)		(penalty scored) Farrell; (penalty scored) Diz; (penalty scored) Dieng; (penalty scored) Edwards

August 23, 2025 USLC	Hartford Athletic	3–0	Rhode Island FC	Hartford, CT
7:30 PM EDT	Careaga 5'; Makangila (yellow card) 48'; Obalola (yellow card) 50'; Edwards 73'; O. Presthus 89'; Diz (yellow card) 90+3'	Report	Corcoran (yellow card) 57'; Sanchez (red card) 84'	Stadium: Trinity Health Stadium; Attendance: 5,500; Referee: Elvis Osmanovic

April 1, 2026 U.S. Open Cup; Second round	Rhode Island FC	2–0	Hartford Athletic	Pawtucket, RI
7:00 PM EDT	Sanchez 12'; J. Williams 30'; Fuson (yellow card) 63'	Report	Chatzipaschalis (yellow card) 68'	Stadium: Centreville Bank Stadium; Attendance: 4,857; Referee: John Matto

April 25, 2026 USL Cup	Hartford Athletic	0–0 (3–4 p)	Rhode Island FC	Hartford, CT
7:00 PM EDT	Moreira (yellow card) 55'; Anaku (yellow card) 89' (yellow-red card) 90'	Report	Holstad (yellow card) 90+4'	Stadium: Trinity Health Stadium; Attendance: 2,983; Referee: Muhammad Kaleia
	Penalties
	Diz (penalty scored); Coffey (penalty missed); Real (penalty scored); Scarlett (penalty scored); Careaga (penalty missed)		(penalty scored) Diop; (penalty missed) Bacharach; (penalty scored) Rodríguez; (penalty scored) Scardina; (penalty scored) Yao

July 18, 2026 USLC	Rhode Island FC	1–0	Hartford Athletic	Pawtucket, RI
7:30 PM EDT	Stoneman (yellow card) 2'; Nodarse 20'; J. Williams (yellow card) 57'; Kwizera (yellow card) 72'	Report	Makangila (yellow card) 41'; Taofeek (yellow card) 45+2'	Stadium: Centreville Bank Stadium; Attendance: 10,199; Referee: Gerald Flores

October 24, 2026 USLC	Hartford Athletic	2–1	Rhode Island FC	Hartford, CT
7:00 PM EDT	Coffey (yellow card) 45'; Anaku (yellow card) 45+1' (goal) 68'; Makangila (yellow card) 72'; Samadia 78'	Report	Yao (yellow card) 20' (goal) 25'; Sanchez (yellow card) 46'; Nodarse (yellow card) 53'; Kwizera (yellow card) 81'	Stadium: Trinity Health Stadium; Attendance: 4,775; Referee: Abdou Ndiaye

=== Match Statistics ===
Competition	Played	HFD Wins	Draws	RIFC Wins	HFD Goals	RIFC Goals	HFD Shootout Wins	RIFC Shootout Wins
USL Championship	6	2	2	2	6	6	n/a	n/a
USL Cup	2	0	2	0	2	2	1	1
U.S. Open Cup	1	0	0	1	0	2	0	0
Total	9	2	4	3	8	10	1	1

=== Eastern Conference standings finishes ===
HFD RIFC

P.	2024	2025	2026
1			
2			
3			
4			
5	5	5	
6			6
7		7	7
8			
9			
10	10		
11			
12			
13			

• Total: Hartford with 2 higher finishes, Rhode Island with 1.

== Top goalscorers ==
As of October 24, 2026. Does not include own goals.

Position	Name	Team	Goals
1	(Cuba) Frank Nodarse	Rhode Island FC	2
2	(Uganda) Sadat Anaku	Hartford Athletic	1
2	(United States) Joe Brito	Rhode Island FC	1
2	(Argentina) Samuel Careaga	Hartford Athletic	1
2	(Cuba) Adrián Diz	Hartford Athletic	1
2	(Republic of Ireland) Mark Doyle	Rhode Island FC	1
2	(Saint Vincent and the Grenadines) Kyle Edwards	Hartford Athletic	1
2	(United States) Joseph Farrell	Hartford Athletic	1
2	(United States) Owen Presthus	Hartford Athletic	1
2	(United States) TJ Presthus	Hartford Athletic	1
2	(United States) Maxi Rodriguez	Rhode Island FC	1
2	(Sierra Leone) Emmanuel Samadia	Hartford Athletic	1
2	(United States) Aldair Sanchez	Rhode Island FC	1
2	(United States) Amos Shapiro-Thompson	Rhode Island FC	1
2	(United States) Grant Stoneman	Rhode Island FC	1
2	(United States) JJ Williams	Rhode Island FC	1
2	(Canada) Karifa Yao	Rhode Island FC	1

== Players who played for both clubs ==
As of October 24, 2026

Hartford first, then Rhode Island

Player	Hartford Athletic career			Rhode Island FC career		
Player	Span	Apps	Goals	Span	Apps	Goals
(United States) Conor McGlynn	2020-2023	99	9	2024	14	1
(Liberia) Prince Saydee	2022-2023	64	14	2024	10	0

Rhode Island first, then Hartford

Player	Rhode Island FC career			Hartford Athletic FC career		
Player	Span	Apps	Goals	Span	Apps	Goals
(United States) Jack Panayotou (Note: Both on loan from New England Revolution.)	2024	11	0	2025	12	3
