= 2025 Rhode Island FC season =

Rhode Island FC
2025 season
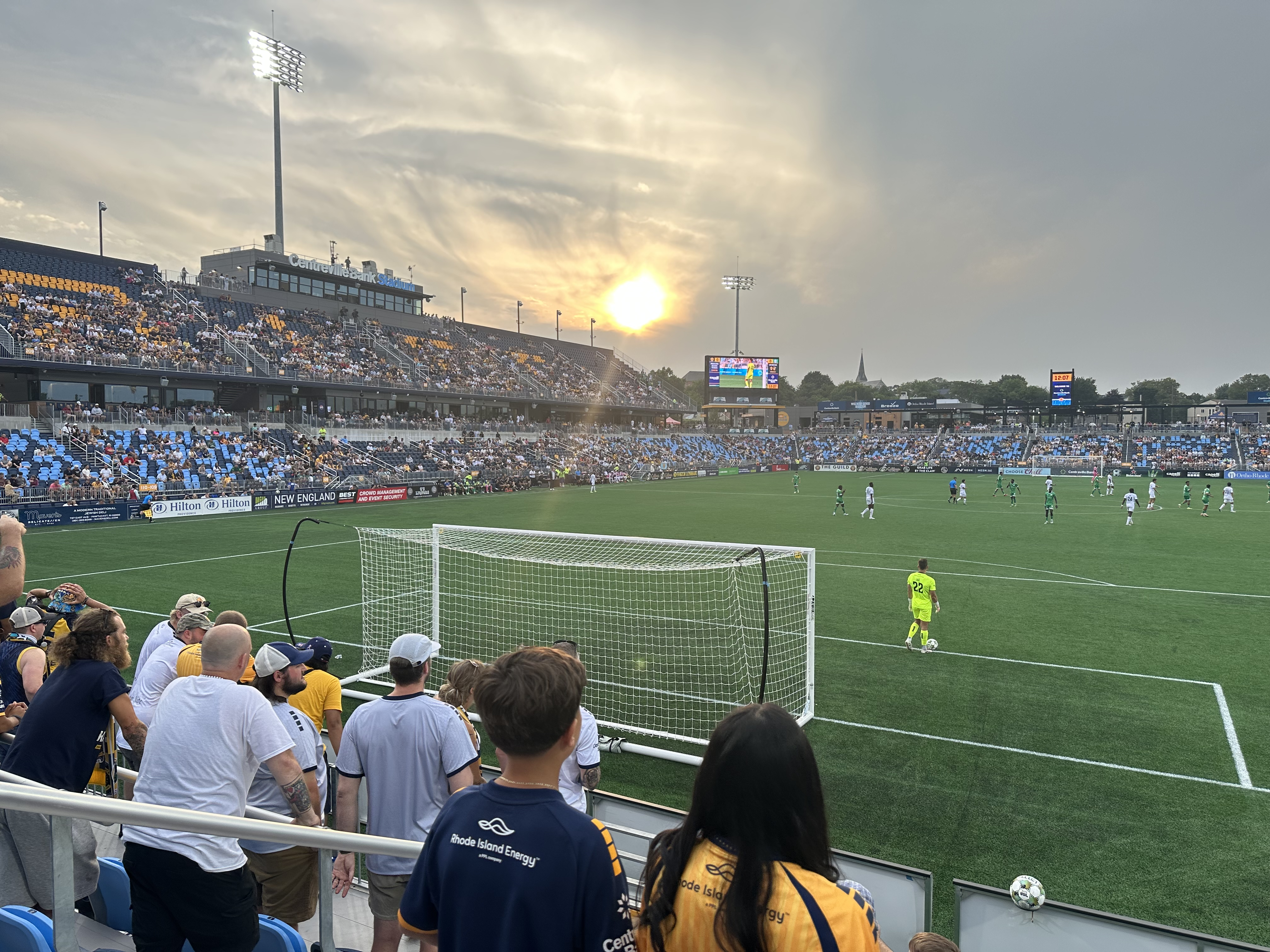
- Rhode Island FC take on Hartford Athletic at Centreville Bank Stadium in July, 2025
- Head coach: Khano Smith
- Stadium: Centreville Bank Stadium, Pawtucket, Rhode Island
- USL Championship: Eastern Conference: 7th place
- U.S. Open Cup: Round of 32
- USL Cup: First Place, Group 4 Semifinals
- USL Championship Playoffs: Eastern Conference Finals
- Top goalscorer: League: JJ Williams (6); All: JJ Williams and Albert Dikwa (8)
- Highest home attendance: 10,749 (July 5)
- Lowest home attendance: 3,703 (August 20)
- Average home league attendance: 8,914
- Biggest win: RI 5–0 TBR (October 11)
- Biggest defeat: HFD 3–0 RI (August 23)
Home colors	Away colors	Third colors
- All statistics correct as of 0:00, November 16, 2025 (UTC).

The 2025 Rhode Island FC season was the second season for Rhode Island FC, and their second in the USL Championship, the second tier of professional soccer in the United States.

The USL Championship played a 30 game regular season in 2025, with four additional scheduled games in the group round of the 2025 USL Cup. Of the 34 scheduled games, 17 were home and 17 were away. The team also participated in and advanced to additional rounds in both the U.S. Open Cup and USL Championship playoffs.

The team's first scheduled home game on May 3 was the inaugural game played in Centreville Bank Stadium. The team played a 0-0 draw against San Antonio FC in front of a 10,700-person sellout.

The team finished with a 10–12–8 record in the regular season, seventh place in the USL Championship Eastern Conference. They reached the Round of 32 in the U.S. Open Cup, and the semi-finals of both the USL Cup and the USL Championship playoffs.

== Preseason ==
RIFC's preseason included a local training camp in Rhode Island, followed by extended training in Florida at IMG Academy, and exhibition games against east coast teams. RIFC played closed-door preseason games against Philadelphia Union II, Orlando City SC, Hartford Athletic, and open friendly matches in Bermuda against the Bermuda National Team and the Portland Hearts of Pine.

The team entered the season with media and player expectations of being a contender for the Eastern Conference title, and were considered likely to host a home playoff game. Sixteen players returned from the previous season's lineup, and signings of Maxi Rodriguez, Dani Rovira, and Hugo Bacharach supplemented the squad members who were defending Eastern Conference champions.

== Regular season ==
=== March ===
Due to the pending completion of Centreville Bank Stadium, RIFC started their season with five consecutive scheduled league road games, as well as away games in the U.S. Open Cup and USL Cup.

After a first-week-of-the-season bye, Rhode Island opened on March 15 at Charleston Battery, losing 2–0, in a game that was a rematch of their 2024 playoff game. Their second game was at Phoenix Rising FC on March 22, where an opening goal from JJ Wiliams and an own goal from a Phoenix player were enough to secure a 2–2 tie.

RIFC concluded March with a 2–0 loss away against Loudon United FC, only taking six shots during the match. Five RIFC players received yellow cards, and Zachary Herivaux received a red card in second-half stoppage time.

=== April ===
Continuing their string of road games, RIFC won their first game of the season in their fourth attempt, on April 5, 3–0 at Oakland Roots. Three RIFC players scored in the first half, and Koke Vegas recorded his first of 11 regular-season clean sheets.

RIFC was drawn into the US Open Cup Third Round, and played away at the Portland Hearts of Pine on April 15. With the Hearts playing in their first season, the game was held in Lewiston, Maine, as Fitzpatrick Stadium, like Centreville Bank Stadium, was not yet fully operational for soccer. RIFC had early goals from Clay Holstad and Frank Nodarse, and hung on for a 2–1 win, with both sides playing with 10 men at the end. The win was RIFC’s first in an Open Cup game.

RIFC traveled to Keyworth Stadium in Detroit on April 19. An early red card to Frank Nodarse resulted in RIFC playing most of the game against Detroit City FC with 10 men. They lost 2–0 in their last league game of the month, ending the month in 10th place in the USL Championship.

The first game of the 2025 USL Cup was on April 27, played at Westchester SC. Though Westchester had played a home game in the US Open Cup against an amateur team, the RIFC game was the first game played at The Stadium at Memorial Field against a professional opponent. RIFC scored three goals in the first half, and won the game 4–1.

=== May ===
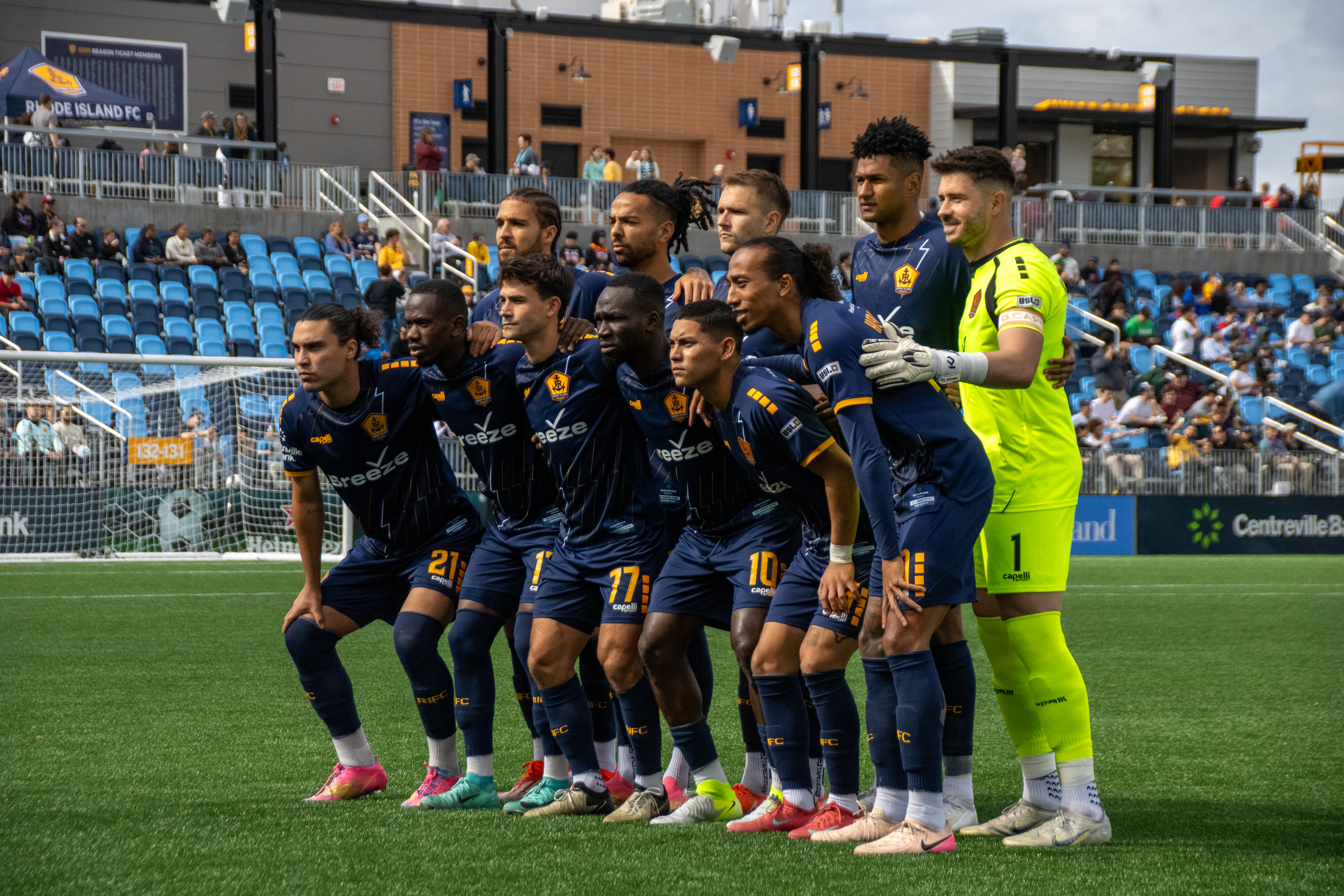
Rhode Island FC starting XI prior to the May 10, 2025 match against Monterey Bay FC

RIFC’s home opener on May 3 was the first official game at Centreville Bank Stadium. The game was announced as a 10,700-person sellout, two hundred over the nominal capacity. RIFC played to a 0–0 draw against San Antonio FC. Opening ceremonies included a flyover from the Rhode Island National Guard, with dignitaries in attendance.

After the April 17 draw in the US Open Cup, RIFC was matched with the New England Revolution for a round-of-32 game at home on May 7. RIFC’s first meeting with an MLS opponent resulted in a 2–1 loss. Tomás Chancalay scored the first goal in Centerville Bank Stadium history, and RIFC’s first goal was scored by Maxi Rodriguez. Though the game was tied late into regular time, an 88th minute goal from Cristiano Oliveira was the game-winner.

RIFC continued their homestand with a May 10 game against Monterey Bay FC. RIFC’s first regular-season goal at Centreville was scored by Joe Brito in the 77th minute to secure a 1–1 draw. The goal was later selected as the team’s 2025 “goal of the year,” and was a finalist for USL Championship-wide goal of the year.

The following week, RIFC embarked on a two-game road trip with matches on May 14 and 17 at Birmingham Legion FC and Tampa Bay Rowdies. Clean-sheet victories of 1–0 and 3–0 gave them their first two-game winning streak of the season.

On May 24, the Pittsburgh Riverhounds came to Centreville Bank Stadium in the first of a home-and-home series, consisting of regular-season and USL Cup games. At RIFC, the home team lost 1–0, and in the Cup rematch away on May 31, RIFC won 1–0 in Pittsburgh on a first-half Jojea Kwizera goal.

RIFC closed the month in 6th place in the Eastern Conference, the highest point they would reach in the standings over the course of the season.

=== June ===
RIFC played Miami FC at home on June 7. With goalie/captain Koke Vegas unavailable due to injury, Jackson Lee started in the first of eight consecutive league games. RIFC lost 1–0 on a Miami goal early in the second half.

The following Wednesday, on June 11, RIFC played away at Louisville City FC, losing 2–1. The lone RIFC goal was an own goal scored by Kyle Adams of Louisville. This was the team's third straight league loss, RIFC’s longest losing streak of the season.

On June 14, at home against North Carolina FC, With the score tied 1–1 for most of the game, Maxi Rodriguez converted a 95th-minute penalty shot to give RIFC their first win at Centreville Bank Stadium.

On June 21, RIFC lost at home to Sacramento Republic FC 2–0. Nearing the halfway point of the regular season, they sat in 8th place, and had a 1-4-2 regular season home record.

RIFC’s June 27 game was a USL Cup match against Portland Hearts of Pine. In their second game this season against Hearts, Albert Dikwa scored the first hat trick in USL Cup history, recording three of his eight goals of the season in all competitions. Coach Khano Smith was given two yellow cards during the halftime break, ejected from the game, and suspended for the next USL Cup match against Hartford. During the second half, Smith was spotted on top of the Centreville Bank Stadium roof, drawing media attention for his actions. Noah Fuson added a fourth goal late in the game to complete a 4–1 victory, putting RIFC in control of the Group 4 standings in their Cup group.

=== July ===
Rhode Island’s July 5 game was a 1–1 draw with Birmingham Legion FC. Noah Fuson scored late in the first half to tie the game, and the game ended without additional scoring. RIFC set the attendance record at Centreville Bank Stadium with an announced 10,749-person sellout, the second of four sellouts during the season.

RIFC traveled to Indy Eleven on July 12, and lost 1–0. JJ Williams returned to the lineup after having been out since April due to injury.

The first of two consecutive El Clamico rivalry games against Hartford Athletic was a nationally-televised league game on July 19. Neither team was able to score. Multiple yellow cards were issued in second-half stoppage time. The game ended with high intensity, with an additional yellow card being issued to a Hartford player after the game ended. Outside the stadium, RIFC and Hartford fans got into a minor altercation as fans departed, with one RIFC fan arrested for disorderly conduct.

RIFC hosted a July 24 “kit reveal” event at Centreville Bank Stadium for fans to see the stadium and meet players. The team publicized their “wave kit,” with a design based on the Rhode Island license plate.

In the follow-up El Clamico game on July 26, part of the USL Cup Group Stage, RIFC played to a 2–2 tie with Hartford. RIFC entered the game only needing a draw to finish at the top of Group 4, and secured their spot as group winner. Despite Hartford playing a man down for most of the game, a Hartford second-half goal was enough to even the game. Hartford outscored RIFC in the ensuing penalty shootout, winning 4–3. By winning the shootout, Hartford also moved on in the USL Cup.

At the end of July, the team was in 10th place in the Eastern Conference.

=== August ===
On August 2, RIFC traveled to Pittsburgh for a game against the Riverhounds. RIFC did not score, and with the team already down 2–0, JJ Williams received a red card in the 69th minute.

Four days later, RIFC hosted Detroit City FC at Centreville Bank Stadium. Maxi Rodriguez converted a penalty shot in the 60th minute, as the only goal in a 1–0 RIFC victory. Koke Vegas returned to the lineup for the first time since May.

The team played August 9 at home against Loudoun United FC, and finished with a scoreless tie.

On August 20, RIFC hosted Birmingham Legion FC in a rainy quarterfinal game of the USL Cup. Dwayne Atkinson, who had joined the team on August 7 from Cavalier F.C. of the Jamaica Premier League, scored his only goal of the season to bring Rhode Island a 1–0 victory. RIFC advanced to the semifinals of the Cup.

In the third El Clamico of the season, RIFC traveled to Hartford on August 23 for their regular-season away game. The Athletic scored an early goal, and added two in the second half, one after a red card by Aldair Sanchez, for a 3–0 Rhode Island loss. This was the only game of the entire season in which RIFC gave up more than two goals.

Second-place Charleston Battery visited RIFC on August 30. JJ Williams’ 69th-minute goal was RIFC’s first during the run of play in a league game since July 5, and was enough for a 1–0 victory. RIFC finished the month in 8th place in the Eastern Conference.

=== September ===
Rhode Island opened September with a sold-out home game against first-place Louisville City FC on September 6. The game was delayed by heavy rain for approximately an hour. Though Louisville only had 4 shots during the game, they scored in the first half, and won the game 1–0.

RIFC hosted Sacramento Republic FC four days later in one of the two USL Cup semifinal games. The teams played to a 0–0 tie after regulation. RIFC lost the penalty shootout 3–0, failing to convert any of their three penalty kicks.

On September 13, ninth-place RIFC hosted eighth-place Indy Eleven. A deflected cross-pass resulted in an own goal off James Musa of Indianapolis, and was the difference in a 1–0 Rhode Island victory. This was the third own goal scored in favor of RIFC on the season, which tied them for the league lead. With the victory, RIFC moved into a playoff position, and did not fall below the playoff line for the rest of the season.

On September 19, Rhode Island played away at Miami FC. RIFC was awarded a penalty shot in the second half, scored by Jojea Kwizera. That was the only goal in a 1–0 RIFC victory.

RIFC traveled to El Paso Locomotive FC for a September 26 game. RIFC took the lead twice, on goals from Zachary Herivaux and JJ Williams, but an own goal for El Paso off the foot of Clay Holstad allowed the Locomotive to tie the game 2–2. This was the first league game in which RIFC scored multiple goals since June 14. September ended with Rhode Island in eight place in the Eastern Conference.

=== October ===
Las Vegas Lights FC came to Centreville Bank Stadium on October 5. Though a full game was played, and 9,879 fans watched a 3–1 Rhode Island victory, Las Vegas was officially assigned a 3–0 forfeit loss the following day. Las Vegas player Vaughn Covil was brought in as an 84th-minute substitute, but had not been on the eligible game roster, requiring a mandatory forfeit. All statistics, including second-half goals from Hugo Bacharach, Noah Fuson, and JJ Williams were officially wiped out.

Rhode Island played Tampa Bay Rowdies in their final home game on October 12. In front of a sellout crowd, RIFC scored early and followed up with four more goals for a 5–0 victory, their largest of the season. JJ Williams scored in the 8th minute, Noah Fuson in the 20th, and Williams later converted a penalty to give a 3–0 halftime lead. Albert Dikwa and Maxi Rodriguez both scored in the second half.

RIFC traveled to North Carolina FC on October 19. The team played a scoreless tie, its sixth straight game without a loss. Koke Vegas recorded his eleventh clean sheet of the regular season, good for second in the league. RIFC’s point in the standings was enough to clinch a playoff spot.

In the regular-season finale, RIFC played New Mexico United away. Hugo Bacharach’s only recorded goal of the season tied the game at 1–1, but a New Mexico penalty shot provided the difference in a 2–1 victory.

== Postseason ==
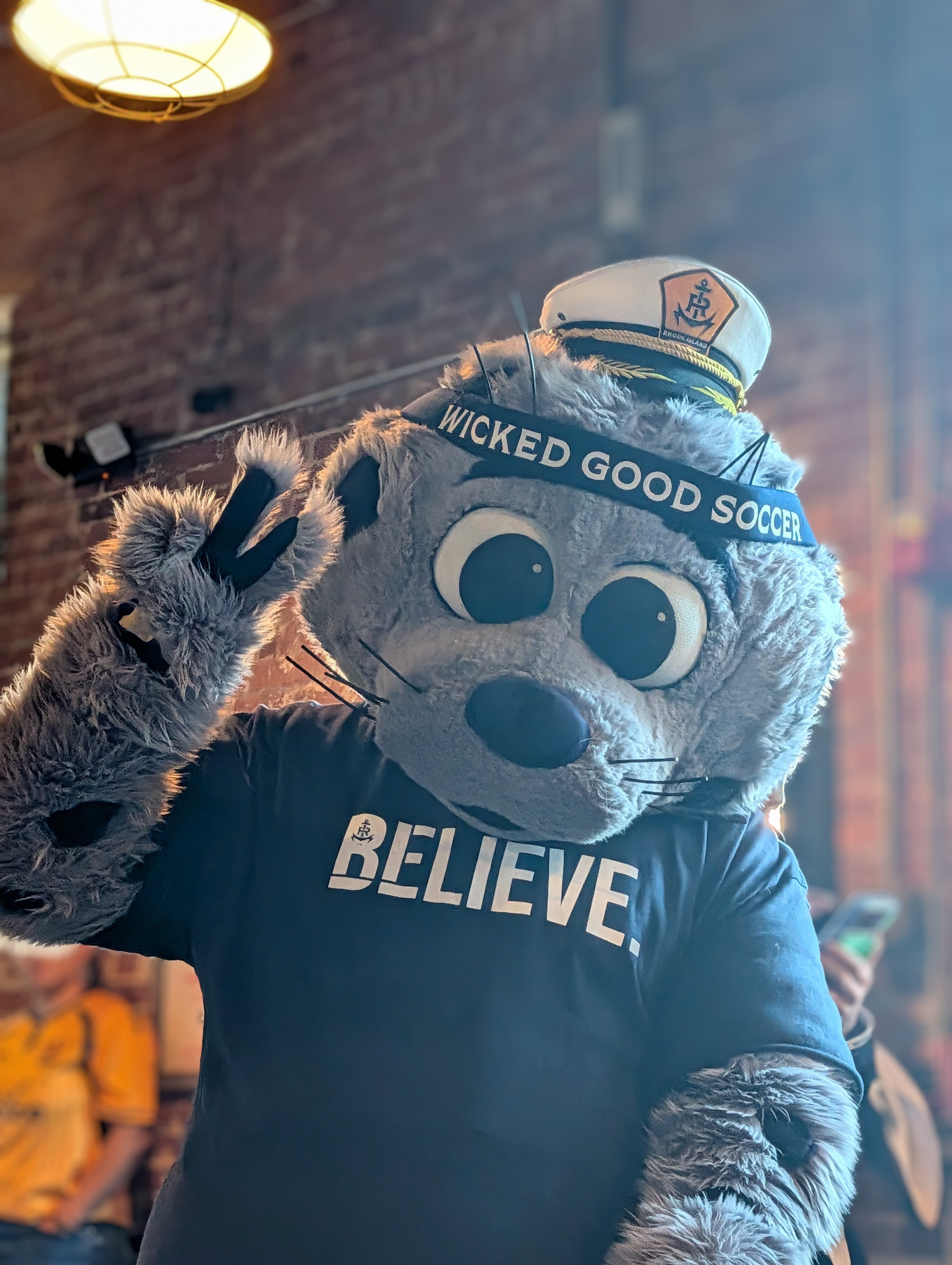
Chip wearing 2025 playoff BELIEVE t-shirt

RIFC finished the regular season in 7th place, giving them their second playoff appearance their two years of existence. The team chose a motto of “BELIEVE” for use during the playoff run, and created a logo with a “RI” motif and team crest embedded inside the letters “B” and “E.”

Rhode Island traveled to Charleston Battery for the Eastern Conference Quarterfinals on November 2. The teams finished regular time with no score, and players from both teams received red cards in second-half stoppage time. By USL playoff rules, the game went to 30 minutes of extra time, and again, no goals were scored. In the ensuing penalty shootout, RIFC won, 5–4, with all five RIFC players hitting their shots. This was RIFC’s first penalty shootout victory, in their fourth attempt. RIFC eliminated Charleston in the playoffs for the second straight year, and moved on to the next round.

One of the two Eastern Conference Semifinal games was played at North Carolina FC on November 9. Five days before the game, NCFC ownership announced that the team would be ceasing competition in the USL Championship. The team decided to go on hiatus, with a pending application into the future USL Division One league will not start until at least 2028. This put RIFC in the position of possibly ending NCFC’s existence as a going concern, allowing all NCFC players to become free agents, and the Carolina team playing their last game ever.

The RIFC–NCFC game was scoreless at halftime. Albert Dikwa scored a pair of goals in the second half and Koke Vegas recorded his second consecuitve playoff clean sheet, to give Rhode Island a 2–0 victory, eliminate NCFC from the playoffs, and move RIFC on to their second consecutive Eastern Conference Final.

The Eastern Conference Final was held on November 16 in Pittsburgh. RIFC played Pittsburgh Riverhounds SC in front of the largest crowd ever at Highmark Stadium. Rhode Island played a scoreless first half, and fell behind in the 53rd minute on a Robbie Mertz goal. Less than 10 minutes later, Marc Ybarra received a second yellow card and was sent off. Though RIFC had offensive chances, they did not score, lost 1–0, and were eliminated from the playoffs.

== Player movement ==
=== In ===
No.	Pos.	Player	Transferred from	Fee/notes	Date	Source
21	MF	(United States) Maxi Rodriguez	(United States) Detroit City FC	Free transfer	December 3, 2024	
4	DF	(Spain) Hugo Bacharach	(United States) Minnesota United FC	Free transfer	December 31, 2024	
8	MF	(Japan) Taimu Okiyoshi	(United States) Marshall University	Free transfer	January 16, 2025	
2	DF	(Colombia) Dani Rovira	(United States) Pittsburgh Riverhounds SC	Free transfer	January 18, 2025	
3	DF	(United States) Aldair Sanchez	(United States) Sacramento Republic FC	Free transfer	February 7, 2025	
13	GK	(United States) Will Meyer	(United States) New York City FC II	Free transfer	February 7, 2025	
16	DF	(United States) Cole Dewhurst	(United States) Providence College	Free transfer	February 11, 2025	
14	DF	(United States) Rio Hope-Gund	(United States) New York City FC	Free transfer	April 4, 2025	
6	DF	(Zambia) Aimé Mabika	(Canada) Toronto FC	Free transfer	May 2, 2025	
36	MF	(United States) Matthew Corcoran	(United States) Nashville FC	Loan	August 5, 2025	
7	MF	(Jamaica) Dwayne Atkinson	(Jamaica) Cavalier FC	Undisclosed fee	August 7, 2025	
27	FW	(Cameroon) Mathieu Ndongo	(Bahrain) Al-Riffa SC	Undisclosed fee	August 25, 2025	
32	DF	(Senegal) Hamady Diop	(United States) San Diego FC	Free Transfer	September 8, 2025	

=== Out ===
Date	Pos.	Player	Transaction	Details	New Club	Ref.
January 18, 2025	DF	(United States) Stephen Turnbull	Transfer	Undisclosed Fee	(United States) Birmingham Legion FC	
July 16, 2025	MF	(Japan) Taimu Okiyoshi	Loan Out	Remainder of Season	(United States) Westchester SC	
July 25, 2025	MF	(Puerto Rico) Isaac Angking	Loan Out	Remainder of Season	(United States) Forward Madison SC	
September 9, 2025	MF	(United States) Matthew Corcoran	Recall of Loan		(United States) Nashville FC	
December 3, 2025	MF	(Puerto Rico) Isaac Angking	Released	Option Declined		
December 3, 2025	MF	(United States) Joe Brito	Released	End of Contract	Retired	
December 3, 2025	DF	(United States) Cole Dewhurst	Released	Option Declined		
December 3, 2025	DF	(United States) Rio Hope-Gund	Released	End of Contract	(United States) Detroit City FC	
December 3, 2025	GK	(Australia) Jackson Lee	Released	End of Contract	(United States) Brooklyn FC	
December 3, 2025	MF	(Japan) Taimu Okiyoshi	Released	Option Declined	(United States) Brooklyn FC	
December 3, 2025	MF	(United States) Marc Ybarra	Released	End of Contract	(United States) Las Vegas Lights FC	

Though goalkeeper Will Meyer was originally announced as having his option declined, he was subsequently re-signed for the 2026 season.

=== Roster ===
As of September 9, 2025

Note: Flags indicate national team as defined under FIFA eligibility rules; some limited exceptions apply. Players may hold more than one non-FIFA nationality.

No.	Pos.	Nation	Player
1	GK	ESP	Koke Vegas
2	DF	COL	Dani Rovira
3	DF	USA	Aldair Sanchez
4	DF	ESP	Hugo Bacharach
5	DF	USA	Grant Stoneman
6	DF	ZAM	Aimé Mabika
7	MF	JAM	Dwayne Atkinson
8	MF	JPN	Taimu Okiyoshi (on loan to Westchester SC)
9	FW	USA	JJ Williams
10	FW	CMR	Albert Dikwa
11	FW	USA	Noah Fuson
12	MF	USA	Clay Holstad
13	GK	USA	Will Meyer
14	DF	USA	Rio Hope-Gund

No.	Pos.	Nation	Player
15	DF	CUB	Frank Nodarse
16	DF	USA	Cole Dewhurst
17	MF	RWA	Jojea Kwizera
18	MF	USA	Joe Brito
19	MF	USA	Kevin Vang
20	MF	HAI	Zachary Herivaux
21	MF	USA	Maxi Rodriguez
22	GK	AUS	Jackson Lee
23	MF	USA	Marc Ybarra
24	DF	CAN	Karifa Yao
27	FW	CMR	Mathieu Ndongo
32	DF	SEN	Hamady Diop
77	MF	USA	Amos Shapiro-Thompson
80	MF	PUR	Isaac Angking (on loan to Forward Madison SC)

== Competitions ==
=== Preseason Friendlies ===
As they did last year, the team worked out at IMG Academy in Bradenton, Florida for a portion of the preseason, followed by a trip to Bermuda for additional friendly games.

Limited details were made available regarding the results. Known information is summarized below.

February 4	Philadelphia Union II	v	Rhode Island FC	Bradenton, FL
				Stadium: IMG Academy
Note: Closed-door scrimmage

February 11	Orlando City SC	0–4	Rhode Island FC	Orlando, FL
		Report
Note: Closed-door scrimmage

February 19	Hartford Athletic	v	Rhode Island FC	Windsor, Connecticut
		Report		Stadium: Day Hill Dome
Note: Closed door scrimmage. No score was reported, but pictures were posted by Rhode Island FC to social media.

February 24	Rhode Island FC	0–0	Portland Hearts of Pine	Devonshire, Bermuda
		Report		Stadium: Flora Duffy South Field Stadium

February 27	Bermuda Select	0–6	(United States) Rhode Island FC	Devonshire, Bermuda
		Report	Kwizera 69'; Fuson 74', 81', 87'; Okiyoshi 77', 89'	Stadium: Flora Duffy South Field Stadium

=== USL Championship ===
==== Eastern Conference ====
Pos	Team	Pld	W	L	T	GF	GA	GD	Pts	Qualification
1	Louisville City FC (S)	30	22	1	7	56	19	+37	73	Playoffs
2	Charleston Battery	30	19	6	5	62	32	+30	62	Playoffs
3	North Carolina FC	30	13	11	6	40	39	+1	45	Playoffs
4	Pittsburgh Riverhounds SC (C)	30	12	10	8	32	28	+4	44 (Note: Pittsburgh Riverhounds SC are ahead of Hartford Athletic on head-to-head points. PGH 6, HFD 0.)	Playoffs
5	Hartford Athletic	30	13	12	5	48	36	+12	44	Playoffs
6	Loudoun United FC	30	12	12	6	45	48	−3	42	Playoffs
7	Rhode Island FC	30	10	12	8	29	28	+1	38	Playoffs
8	Detroit City FC	30	9	11	10	33	35	−2	37	Playoffs
9	Indy Eleven	30	10	15	5	44	52	−8	35	
10	Tampa Bay Rowdies	30	9	14	7	43	50	−7	34	
11	Miami FC	30	8	16	6	29	44	−15	30	
12	Birmingham Legion FC	30	5	13	12	36	50	−14	27	

Source: USL Championship Standings
Rules for classification: 1) head-to-head points; 2) head-to-head goal differential; 3) points-per-game within conference; 4) total wins; 5) total goal differential; 6) total goals scored; 7) points earned against top four Conference finishers; 8) disciplinary points; 9) coin toss or drawing of lots
(C) Champions; (S) Players' Shield winner

==== Results summary ====
Overall								Home						Away					
Pld	W	D	L	GF	GA	GD	Pts	W	D	L	GF	GA	GD	W	D	L	GF	GA	GD
30	10	8	12	29	28	+1	38	6	5	4	15	8	+7	4	3	8	14	20	−6

Last updated: October 24, 2025.
Source: Match reports

Round	1	2	3	4	5	6	7	8	9	10	11	12	13	14	15	16	17	18	19	20	21	22	23	24	25	26	27	28	29	30
Stadium	A	A	A	A	A	H	H	A	A	H	H	A	H	H	H	A	H	A	H	H	A	H	H	H	A	A	H	H	A	A
Result	L	D	L	W	L	D	D	W	W	L	L	L	W	L	D	L	D	L	W	D	L	W	L	W	W	D	W	W	D	L
Eastern Conference	9	10	10	8	10	10	10	6	6	6	8	8	6	8	9	10	10	10	8	8	9	8	9	8	8	8	8	7	7	7

Updated to match(es) played on October 24, 2025. Source: Match reports
A = Away; H = Home; W = Win; D = Draw; L = Loss

==== Regular season ====
March 15 1	Charleston Battery	2–0	Rhode Island FC	Mount Pleasant, SC
7:30PM	Jennings 15', 37'; Landry (yellow card) 90+4'	Report	Holstad (yellow card) 41'	Stadium: Patriots Point Soccer Complex; Attendance: 2,480; Referee: Natalie Simon

March 22 2	Phoenix Rising FC	2–2	Rhode Island FC	Phoenix, AZ
10:00PM	Cuello (yellow card) 28'; Rivera 40'; Smith (yellow card) 46'; Avayevu 55'; Boye (yellow card) 76'	Report	Williams 16'; Fuson (yellow card) 19'; Boye 42' (o.g.); Sanchez (yellow card) 48'	Stadium: Phoenix Rising Soccer Stadium; Attendance: 5,549; Referee: Alyssa Nichols

March 29 3	Loudoun United FC	2–0	Rhode Island FC	Leesburg, VA
4:00PM	Leerman (yellow card) 11' (yellow-red card) 67'; Aboukoura 35', 40'; Awuah (yellow card) 90'	Report	Stoneman (yellow card) 8'; Holstad (yellow card) 12'; Sanchez (yellow card) 43'; Ybarra (yellow card) 58'; Shapiro-Thompson (yellow card) 85'; Herivaux (red card) 90+4'	Stadium: Segra Field; Attendance: 2,244; Referee: Matthew Thompson

April 5 4	Oakland Roots SC	0–3	Rhode Island FC	Oakland, CA
4:00 PM	Greene (yellow card) 29'	Report	Williams (yellow card) 6' (goal) 45+5'; Dikwa 40'; Holstad 42'; Ybarra (yellow card) 75'	Stadium: Oakland Coliseum; Attendance: 4,765; Referee: Servando Berna Rico

April 19 5	Detroit City FC	2–0	Rhode Island FC	Hamtramck, MI
4:00PM	Smith 17', 19'; Villanueva (yellow card) 70'; Sheldon (yellow card) 90+6'	Report	Nodarse (red card) 6'; Williams (yellow card) 55'	Stadium: Keyworth Stadium; Attendance: 5,539; Referee: Joshua Encarnación

May 3 6	Rhode Island FC	0–0	San Antonio FC	Pawtucket, RI
4:00PM	Holstad (yellow card) 44'; Kwizera (yellow card) 65'	Report	J. Hernández (yellow card) 34'; Paredes (yellow card) 45+1'; D. Hernandez (yellow card) 77'	Stadium: Centreville Bank Stadium; Attendance: 10,700; Referee: Alyssa Nichols

May 10 7	Rhode Island FC	1–1	Monterey Bay FC	Pawtucket, RI
4:00 PM	Brito 77'; Sanchez (yellow card) 82'	Report	Malango 17'; Ivanovic (yellow card) 25'; Bryant (yellow card) 35'; Lara (yellow card) 55'	Stadium: Centreville Bank Stadium; Attendance: 7,474; Referee: John Griggs

May 14 8	Birmingham Legion FC	0–1	Rhode Island FC	Birmingham, AL
8:00PM	McIllhatton (yellow card) 5' (yellow-red card) 45'; Hamouda (yellow card) 43'; Torres (yellow card) 90+4'	Report	Rodriguez 14'	Stadium: Protective Stadium; Attendance: 3,767; Referee: Luis Arroyo

May 17 9	Tampa Bay Rowdies	0–3	Rhode Island FC	St. Petersburg, FL
7:30PM	Lasso (yellow card) 19'; Wyke (yellow card) 21' (yellow-red card) 78'	Report	Holstad 45+5'; Herivaux 73' (yellow card) 90'; Fuson 87'; Shapiro-Thompson (yellow card) 90+1'	Stadium: Al Lang Stadium; Attendance: 4,810; Referee: Elvis Osmanovic

May 24 10	Rhode Island FC	0–1	Pittsburgh Riverhounds SC	Pawtucket, RI
4:00PM	Sanchez (yellow card) 40'; Herivaux (yellow card) 58'; Shapiro-Thompson (yellow card) 90+2'	Report	Ydrach (yellow card) 6'; Wälti (yellow card) 29'; Griffin 37' (yellow card) 87'; Biasi (yellow card) 83'	Stadium: Centreville Bank Stadium; Attendance: 8,387; Referee: Greg Dopka

June 7 11	Rhode Island FC	0–1	Miami FC	Pawtucket, RI
7:00PM	Herivaux (yellow card) 56'; Holstad (yellow card) 74'	Report	Vázquez (yellow card) 7'; Bent (yellow card) 33'; Blanco 54'; Bonfiglio (yellow card) 73'; Akinyode (yellow card) 90+6'	Stadium: Centreville Bank Stadium; Attendance: 7,508; Referee: Calin Radosav

June 11 12	Louisville City FC	2–1	Rhode Island FC	Louisville, KY
8:00PM	Davila (yellow card) 17'; McFadden 20'; Totsch (yellow card) 56'; Serrano 63'	Report	Nodarse (yellow card) 5'; Adams 27' (o.g.); Kwizera (yellow card) 71' (yellow-red card) 90+5'; Fuson (yellow card) 90'	Stadium: Lynn Family Stadium; Attendance: 9,183; Referee: Elton García

June 14 13	Rhode Island FC	2–1	North Carolina FC	Pawtucket, RI
7:00PM	Dikwa 18'; Sanchez (yellow card) 23'; Nodarse (yellow card) 81'; Rodriguez 90+5' (pen.)	Report	Perez (yellow card) 12'; Mentzingen 35'; Burner (yellow card) 40'	Stadium: Centreville Bank Stadium; Attendance: 7,072; Referee: Elijio Arreguin

June 21 14	Rhode Island FC	0–2	Sacramento Republic FC	Pawtucket, RI
7:00PM	Yao (yellow card) 53'	Report	Gurr (yellow card) 31'; Benítez (yellow card) 49'; López 55'; Parano 63' (yellow card) 71'	Stadium: Centreville Bank Stadium; Attendance: 7,595; Referee: Nabil Bensalah

July 5 15	Rhode Island FC	1–1	Birmingham Legion FC	Pawtucket, RI
7:00PM	Fuson 44'; Holstad (yellow card) 45+2'; Rodriguez (yellow card) 57'; Kwizera (yellow card) 90+3'	Report	Damus 27' (yellow card) 35'; Suárez (yellow card) 29'; Laszo (yellow card) 47'; Paterson (yellow card) 90+7'	Stadium: Centreville Bank Stadium; Attendance: 10,749; Referee: Abdou Ndiaye

July 12 16	Indy Eleven	1–0	Rhode Island FC	Indianapolis, IN
7:00PM	Williams 55'; White (yellow card) 75'; Collier (yellow card) 88'; Sulte (yellow card) 90+5'	Report	Shapiro-Thompson (yellow card) 24'; Yao (yellow card) 51'; Williams (yellow card) 90+1'	Stadium: Carroll Stadium; Attendance: 9,039; Referee: Mark Verso

July 19 17	Rhode Island FC	0–0	Hartford Athletic	Pawtucket, RI
7:00PM	Ybarra (yellow card) 7'; Shapiro-Thompson (yellow card) 45+5'; Bacharach (yellow card) 86'; Kwizera (yellow card) 90+8'; Yao (yellow card) 90+9'	Report	Samadia (yellow card) 19'; Dieng (yellow card) 51'; Hairston (yellow card) 90+11'; Siaha (yellow card) 90+12'	Stadium: Centreville Bank Stadium; Attendance: 10,619; Referee: Jeremy Scheer

August 2 18	Pittsburgh Riverhounds SC	2–0	Rhode Island FC	Pittsburgh, PA
7:00PM	Biasi (yellow card) 32'; Griffin (yellow card) 42'; Williams 51' (yellow card) 81'; Jacquesson 57'; Vacter (yellow card) 63'	Report	Shapiro-Thompson (yellow card) 20'; Rodriguez (yellow card) 28'; Bacharach (yellow card) 67'; Williams (red card) 69'	Stadium: Highmark Stadium; Attendance: 5,044; Referee: Matthew Thompson

August 6 19	Rhode Island FC	1–0	Detroit City FC	Pawtucket, RI
7:00PM	Ybarra (yellow card) 49'; Rodriguez 60' (pen.) (yellow card) 88'; Mabika (yellow card) 72'; Corcoran (yellow card) 82'; Brito (yellow card) 90+5'	Report	Yamazaki (yellow card) 28'; Cedeño (yellow card) 57'; Diop (yellow card) 72'; Sheldon (yellow card) 90+6'	Stadium: Centreville Bank Stadium; Attendance: 7,776; Referee: Corbyn May

August 9 20	Rhode Island FC	0–0	Loudoun United FC	Pawtucket, RI
7:00PM	Williams (yellow card) 90+3'	Report	Skundrich (yellow card) 70'; Tingey (yellow card) 76'	Stadium: Centreville Bank Stadium; Attendance: 8,514; Referee: Natalie Simon

August 23 21	Hartford Athletic	3−0	Rhode Island FC	Hartford, CT
7:00PM	Careaga 5'; Makangila (yellow card) 48'; Obalola (yellow card) 50'; Edwards 73'; Presthus 89'; Diz (yellow card) 90+3'	Report	Corcoran (yellow card) 57'; Sanchez (red card) 84'	Stadium: Trinity Health Stadium; Attendance: 5,500; Referee: Elvis Osmanovic

August 30 22	Rhode Island FC	1−0	Charleston Battery	Pawtucket, RI
7:00PM	Bacharach (yellow card) 34'; Williams (yellow card) 41' (goal) 69'; Holstad (yellow card) 66'	Report	Rubin (yellow card) 83'	Stadium: Centreville Bank Stadium; Attendance: 7,787; Referee: Edson Carvajal

September 6 23	Rhode Island FC	0−1	Louisville City FC	Pawtucket, RI
7:00PM	Ybarra (yellow card) 31'; Holstad (yellow card) 68'; Yao (yellow card) 71'; Williams (yellow card) 89'; Bacharach (yellow card) 90+1'	Report	McFadden 18'	Stadium: Centreville Bank Stadium; Attendance: 10,534; Referee: Benjamin Meyer

September 13 24	Rhode Island FC	1−0	Indy Eleven	Pawtucket, RI
7:00PM	Herivaux (yellow card) 23'; Fuson (yellow card) 54'; Musa 64' (o.g.); Mabika (red card) 88'	Report	Ofeimu (yellow card) 19'; Musa (yellow card) 45+2'; Amoh (red card) 90+2'	Stadium: Centreville Bank Stadium; Attendance: 8,498; Referee: Rodrigo Albuquerque

September 19 25	Miami FC	0−1	Rhode Island FC	Miami, FL
7:00PM	Bonfiglio (yellow card) 52'; Knutson (yellow card) 86'; Yacoubou (yellow card) 90'	Report	Kwizera 68' (pen.); Bacharach (yellow card) 82'	Stadium: FIU Soccer Stadium / Leyva Family Field; Attendance: 768; Referee: Cristian Campo

September 26 26	El Paso Locomotive FC	2−2	Rhode Island FC	El Paso, TX
9:00PM	Alfaro (yellow card) 32'; Calvillo (yellow card) 41'; Diaz 44'; Ruiz (yellow card) 51'; Holstad 74' (o.g.); Avila (yellow card) 87'	Report	Herivaux 29'; Bacharach (yellow card) 37'; Holstad (yellow card) 43'; Williams 61'; Dikwa (yellow card) 67'; Nodarse (yellow card) 77'	Stadium: Southwest University Park; Attendance: 5,312; Referee: Joshua Encarnación

October 5 27	Rhode Island FC	3−0 (F)	Las Vegas Lights FC	Pawtucket, RI
5:00PM		Report		Stadium: Centreville Bank Stadium; Attendance: 9,879; Referee: Ekaterina Koroleva
Note: Though the game ended in a 3–1 win for Rhode Island, they were awarded a 3–0 forfeit victory due to Las Vegas Lights fielding an ineligible player, Vaughn Covil, starting in the 84th minute. All statistics from the game were wiped out. This included goals for RIFC by Bacharach, Fuson, and Williams in the 70th, 90th, and 90+5 minutes, and a Las Vegas goal by Stojanovic in the 46th minute. Yellow cards to Bacharach (40), Yao (62), Holstad (83) and Williams (90+5) for Rhode Island, and O'Driscoll (45+3) and Stojanovic (62) were all removed from official records.

October 11 28	Rhode Island FC	5−0	Tampa Bay Rowdies	Pawtucket, RI
7:00PM	Williams 8' 45+1' (pen.); Stoneman (yellow card) 10'; Fuson 28' (yellow card) 90+1'; Dikwa 69'; Rodriguez 88'	Report	Guillén (yellow card) 78'; Arteaga (yellow card) 80'	Stadium: Centreville Bank Stadium; Attendance: 10,621; Referee: Jeremy Scheer

October 18 29	North Carolina FC	0−0	Rhode Island FC	Cary, NC
4:00PM	Maldonado (yellow card) 26'; Burner (yellow card) 77'; Perez (yellow card) 83'	Report	Shapiro-Thompson (yellow card) 15'; Nodarse (yellow card) 86'	Stadium: WakeMed Soccer Park; Attendance: 3,586; Referee: Elijio Arreguin

October 24 30	New Mexico United	2−1	Rhode Island FC	Albuquerque, NM
9:00PM	Akale 21'; Maples 44' (pen.)	Report	Dikwa (yellow card) 35'; Bacharach 38'; Ybarra (yellow card) 41'; Williams (yellow card) 82'	Stadium: Isotopes Park; Attendance: 10,125; Referee: Brandon Stevis

==== Playoffs ====
November 2 Eastern Conference Quarterfinals	Charleston Battery	0−0 (a.e.t.) (3−5 p)	Rhode Island FC	Mount Pleasant, SC
2:00PM	Archer (yellow card) 33'; Segbers (yellow card) 90+5'; Landry (red card) 90+6'	Report	Williams (yellow card) 24'; Kwizera (yellow card) 90+2' (yellow-red card) 90+6'; Fuson (yellow card) 105'; Bacharach (yellow card) 107'	Stadium: Patriots Point Soccer Complex; Attendance: 4,532; Referee: Elton García
	Penalties
	Molloy (penalty scored); Rubín (penalty scored); Rodríguez (penalty missed); Myers (penalty scored)		(penalty scored) Williams; (penalty scored) Diop; (penalty scored) Rodriguez; (penalty scored) Bacharach; (penalty scored) Mabika

November 8 Eastern Conference Semifinals	North Carolina FC	0−2	Rhode Island FC	Cary, NC
7:00PM	Somersall (yellow card) 36'; Maldonado (yellow card) 42'	Report	Fuson (yellow card) 29'; Dikwa 81', 90+3'	Stadium: WakeMed Soccer Park; Attendance: 2,287; Referee: Joshua Encarnación

November 15 Eastern Conference Finals	Pittsburgh Riverhounds SC	1–0	Rhode Island FC	Pittsburgh, PA
6:30PM	Mertz 55'; Griffin (yellow card) 59'; Etou (yellow card) 75'; Barnes (yellow card) 90+7'	Report	Ybarra (yellow card) 30' (yellow-red card) 60'; Williams (yellow card) 42'; Bacharach (yellow card) 72'	Stadium: Highmark Stadium; Attendance: 6,745; Referee: Nabil Bensalah

=== U.S. Open Cup ===
RIFC entered in the Third Round of the 2025 U.S. Open Cup, joining the competition at the same time as 15 other USL Championship teams. The draw for the round was held on April 3, with the team selected to play the Portland Hearts of Pine in Maine. RIFC won the game 2–1, with goals from Clay Holstad and Frank Nodarse.

Rhode Island was drawn against the New England Revolution in the Round of 32 of the Cup for a home game on May 7. The team lost 2–1, after an 88th minute goal from the Revolution.

April 15 Third round	Portland Hearts of Pine (USL1) (Maine)	1–2	Rhode Island FC (USLC)	Lewiston, ME
7:00PM	Lopez (yellow card) 9' (yellow-red card) 87'; Langlois (yellow card) 36'; Poon-Angeron (yellow card) 47'; Washington 65'	Report	Nodarse (yellow card) 29' (goal) 37'; Holstad 34'; Sanchez (yellow card) 45+3'; Shapiro-Thompson (yellow card) 49'; Yao (yellow card) 76' (yellow-red card) 78'	Stadium: Franklin Athletic Complex; Referee: Thomas Snyder

May 7 Round of 32	Rhode Island FC (USLC)	1–2	(Massachusetts) New England Revolution (MLS)	Pawtucket, RI
7:30	Nodarse (yellow card) 8'; Holstad (yellow card) 45+2'; Rodriguez 50'	Report	Oyirwoth (yellow card) 32'; Chancalay 38'; Oliveira 88'; Klein (yellow card) 90+4'	Stadium: Centreville Bank Stadium; Attendance: 9,539; Referee: Calin Radosav

=== USL Cup ===
==== Table - Group 4 ====
Pos	Lg	Team	Pld	W	PKW	PKL	L	GF	GA	GD	Pts	Qualification
1	USLC	Rhode Island FC	4	3	0	1	0	11	4	+7	10	Advance to knockout stage
2	USLC	Hartford Athletic	4	2	1	1	0	9	6	+3	9	Advance to knockout stage (wild card)
3	USLC	Detroit City FC	4	2	1	0	1	8	6	+2	8	
4	USL1	Portland Hearts of Pine	4	1	1	0	2	7	10	−3	5	
5	USLC	Pittsburgh Riverhounds SC	4	1	0	1	2	3	4	−1	4	
6	USL1	Westchester SC	4	0	0	0	4	3	11	−8	0	

Updated to match(es) played on July 26, 2025. Source: USL

==== Group Rounds ====
April 27 Round 1	Westchester SC	1–4	Rhode Island FC	Mount Vernon, NY
2:00PM	Bouman (yellow card) 34'; Blommestijn (yellow card) 56'; Bolanos (yellow card) 79' (goal) 85'	Report	Nodarse 25'; Williams 28', 65'; Rodriguez 37'	Stadium: The Stadium at Memorial Field; Attendance: 2,783; Referee: Joe Surgan

May 31 Round 2	Pittsburgh Riverhounds SC	0–1	Rhode Island FC	Pittsburgh, PA
7:00 PM	Wälti (yellow card) 37'; Vacter (yellow card) 64'	Report	Rodriguez (yellow card) 6'; Kwizera 19'; Holstad (yellow card) 42'; Dikwa (yellow card) 45+1'; Herivaux (yellow card) 71'	Stadium: Highmark Stadium; Attendance: 5,074; Referee: John Matto

June 27 Round 3	Rhode Island FC	4–1	Portland Hearts of Pine	Pawtucket, RI
7:00PM	Dikwa 18', 50', 58' (yellow card) 44'; Kwizera (yellow card) 36'; Rodriguez (yellow card) 48'; Fuson 85'; Sanchez (yellow card) 90'	Report	Wright (yellow card) 17'; Mohamed (yellow card) 53'; Washington 63'	Stadium: Centreville Bank Stadium; Attendance: 7,502; Referee: Muhammad Hassan

July 26 Round 4	Rhode Island FC	2–2 (3–4 p)	Hartford Athletic	Pawtucket, RI
7:00 PM	Fuson (yellow card) 11'; Shapiro-Thompson 49'; Holstad (yellow card) 56'; Rodriguez (yellow card) 71' (goal) 79' (pen.)	Report	Makangila (yellow card) 22' (yellow-red card) 28'; Presthus 45+3'; Farrell (yellow card) 64'; Siaha (yellow card) 78'; Diz 83'	Stadium: Centreville Bank Stadium; Attendance: 7,242; Referee: Brandon Stevis
	Penalties
	Rodriguez (penalty scored); Fuson (penalty scored); Ybarra (penalty missed); Dikwa (penalty scored); Sanchez (penalty missed)		(penalty scored) Farrell; (penalty scored) Diz; (penalty scored) Dieng; (penalty scored) Edwards

==== Knockout Rounds ====
August 20 Quarterfinals	Rhode Island FC	1–0	Birmingham Legion FC	Pawtucket, RI
7:00 PM	Corcoran (yellow card) 7'; Atkinson 74' (yellow card) 90+4'	Report	Suárez (yellow card) 85'; Tabort Etaka (yellow card) 87'; Laszo (red card) 90+1'	Stadium: Centreville Bank Stadium; Attendance: 3,703; Referee: Brad Jensen

September 10 Semifinals	Rhode Island FC	0–0 (0–3 p)	Sacramento Republic FC	Pawtucket, RI
7:00PM	Sanchez (yellow card) 8'; Bacharach (yellow card) 28'; Shapiro-Thompson (yellow card) 50'; Fuson (yellow card) 77'	Report	López (yellow card) 52'; Gurr (yellow card) 84'	Stadium: Centreville Bank Stadium; Attendance: 4,899; Referee: Greg Dopka
	Penalties
	Rodriguez (penalty missed); Williams (penalty missed); Fuson (penalty missed)		(penalty scored) López; (penalty scored) Cicerone; (penalty scored) Benítez

== Player statistics ==
=== Goals ===
Place	Pos.	No.	Name	USL Championship	US Open Cup	USL Cup	USLC Playoffs	Total
1	FW	9	(United States) JJ Williams	6	0	2	0	8
1	FW	10	(Cameroon) Albert Dikwa	3	0	3	2	8
3	MF	21	(United States) Maxi Rodriguez	4	1	2	0	7
4	MF	11	(United States) Noah Fuson	3	0	1	0	4
5	MF	12	(United States) Clay Holstad	2	1	0	0	3
6	DF	15	(Cuba) Frank Nodarse	0	1	1	0	2
6	FW	17	(Rwanda) Jojea Kwizera	1	0	1	0	2
6	MF	20	(Haiti) Zachary Herivaux	2	0	0	0	2
9	MF	18	(United States) Joe Brito	1	0	0	0	1
9	MF	77	(United States) Amos Shapiro-Thompson	0	0	1	0	1
9	MF	7	(Jamaica) Dwayne Atkinson	0	0	1	0	1
9	DF	4	(Spain) Hugo Bacharach	1	0	0	0	1
Own Goals				3	0	0	0	3
Total				26	3	12	2	43

=== Assists ===
Place	Pos.	No.	Name	USL Championship	US Open Cup	USL Cup	USLC Playoffs	Total
1	DF	3	(United States) Aldair Sanchez	3	1	2	0	6
2	FW	10	(Cameroon) Albert Dikwa	4	0	1	0	5
3	MF	21	(United States) Maxi Rodriguez	2	0	2	0	4
3	FW	11	(United States) Noah Fuson	1	1	1	1	4
5	MF	17	(Rwanda) Jojea Kwizera	1	0	1	0	2
5	FW	9	(United States) JJ Williams	2	0	0	0	2
7	MF	12	(United States) Clay Holstad	1	0	0	0	1
7	MF	20	(Haiti) Zachary Herivaux	0	0	1	0	1
7	DF	5	(United States) Grant Stoneman	1	0	0	0	1
7	MF	23	(United States) Marc Ybarra	0	0	1	0	1
7	MF	20	(Haiti) Zachary Herivaux	0	0	1	0	1
7	DF	6	(Zambia) Aimé Mabika	1	0	0	0	1
Total				16	2	10	1	29

=== Clean Sheets ===
Place	Pos.	No.	Name	USL Championship	US Open Cup	USL Cup	USLC Playoffs	Total
1	GK	1	(Spain) Koke Vegas	11	0	2	2	15
2	GK	22	(Australia) Jackson Lee	1	0	1	0	2
Total				12	0	3	2	17

=== Disciplinary ===
No.	Pos.	Name	USL Championship		US Open Cup		USL Cup		USLC Playoffs		Total	
No.	Pos.	Name	Yellow card	Red card	Yellow card	Red card	Yellow card	Red card	Yellow card	Red card	Yellow card	Red card
3	DF	(United States) Aldair Sanchez	5	1	1		2				8	1
4	DF	(Spain) Hugo Bacharach	6				1		2		9	
5	DF	(United States) Grant Stoneman	2								2	
6	DF	(Zambia) Aimé Mabika	1	1							1	1
7	MF	(Jamaica) Dwayne Atkinson					1				1	
9	FW	(United States) JJ Williams	7	1					2		9	1
10	FW	(Cameroon) Albert Dikwa	2				2				4	
11	FW	(United States) Noah Fuson	4				2		2		8	
12	MF	(United States) Clay Holstad	8		1		2				11	
15	DF	(Cuba) Frank Nodarse	4	1	2						6	1
17	DF	(Rwanda) Jojea Kwizera	3	1			1			1	4	2
18	MF	(United States) Joe Brito	1								1	
20	MF	(Haiti) Zachary Herivaux	4	1			1				5	1
21	MF	(United States) Maxi Rodriguez	3				3				6	
23	MF	(United States) Marc Ybarra	6							1	6	1
24	DF	(Canada) Karifa Yao	4			1					4	1
36	MF	(United States) Matthew Corcoran	2				1				3	
77	MF	(United States) Amos Shapiro-Thompson	7		1		1				9	
Total			69	6	5	1	17	0	6	2	97	9

== League Honors ==
- USL Championship Team of the Week
  - Albert Dikwa – Week 5
  - Noah Fuson – Week 32 (bench)
  - Clay Holstad – Week 5
  - Jojea Kwizera – Week 5
  - Maxi Rodriguez – Week 15
  - Aldair Sanchez – Week 32 (bench)
  - Grant Stoneman – Week 12 (bench)
  - Koke Vegas – Week 11 (bench), 26
  - JJ Williams – Week 3, 5 (bench), 32
- USL Cup Team of the Round
  - Albert Dikwa – Round 3
  - Noah Fuson – Round 3
  - Frank Nodarse – Round 1
  - Maxi Rodriguez – Round 1
  - Aldair Sanchez – Round 3
  - JJ Williams – Round 1
- USL Championship Coach of the Week
  - Khano Smith – Week 11
- USL Championship Goal of the Week
  - Joe Brito – Week 10
  - Noah Fuson – Week 17/18
  - Clay Holstad – Week 11
- USL Championship Save of the Week
  - Jackson Lee – Week 22
  - Koke Vegas – Week 8/9
