= 2026 Hartford Athletic season =

Hartford Athletic
2026 season
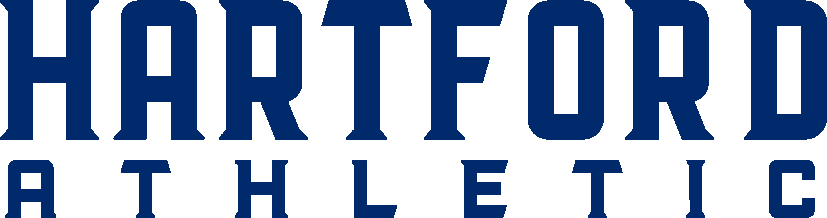
- Head coach: Brendan Burke
- Stadium: Trinity Health Stadium
- USL Championship: Conference: 6th
- U.S. Open Cup: Second round
- USL Cup: Runner-up
- USLC playoffs: Conference Semi-finals
- Top goalscorer: League: All: 7 goals (Three players)
- Highest home attendance: 6,179 (USL Cup final vs. Louisville City)
- Lowest home attendance: 1,148 (May 9, against Detroit City FC)
- Average home league attendance: 3,062
- Biggest win: 3–0 (at Sporting Jax, March 7)
- Biggest defeat: 0–4 (April 11, against El Paso Locomotive FC)
Home colors	Away colors

The 2026 Hartford Athletic season was the club's eighth season of existence and their eighth in the USL Championship, the second tier of American soccer.

Hartford Athletic also played in the U.S. Open Cup for the sixth time in club history and the USL Cup for the second time, after they defeated Sacramento Republic FC in the previous year's final.

== Roster ==
As of October 31, 2026

Note: Flags indicate national team as defined under FIFA eligibility rules; some limited exceptions apply. Players may hold more than one non-FIFA nationality.

No.	Pos.	Nation	Player
1	GK	BRA	Enzo Carvalho
2	DF	USA	Sebastian Anderson
3	DF	USA	Matt Real
4	DF	JAM	Jordan Scarlett
5	DF	GAM	Baboucarr Njie
6	MF	COD	Beverly Makangila
7	MF	NGR	Michael Adedokun (on loan from Lexington SC)
8	MF	GBS	Junior Moreira
9	FW	SLE	Augustine Williams
10	MF	ARG	Samuel Careaga
11	FW	COD	Michee Ngalina
15	DF	CUB	Adrián Diz
16	MF	IRL	Barry Coffey

No.	Pos.	Nation	Player
17	FW	UGA	Sadat Anaku
18	MF	CYP	Christos Hadjipaschalis
19	MF	SLE	Emmanuel Samadia
21	MF	USA	Ben Mines (on loan from Las Vegas Lights)
22	DF	USA	TJ Presthus
24	DF	USA	Galen Flynn
25	DF	USA	Britton Fischer (on loan from Minnesota United)
27	FW	USA	Spencer Gordon
28	DF	USA	Cesar Miranda
29	FW	NGR	Abdullah Taofeek
77	GK	CMR	Antony Siaha
81	FW	NGR	Adewale Obalola
47	DF	USA	Oscar Pearman

1. USL Academy Contract

== Transfers ==
=== In ===
Pos	Player	Transferred from	Fee	Date	Source
DF	(United States) Matthew Real	Colorado Springs Switchbacks	Free transfer	December 10, 2025	
MF	(Republic of Ireland) Barry Coffey	(Republic of Ireland) Cobh Ramblers	Free transfer	January 23, 2026	
GK	(Brazil) Enzo Carvalho	Bryant Bulldogs	Free agent	January 23, 2026	
FW	(Sierra Leone) Augustine Williams	Pittsburgh Riverhounds	Free transfer	January 27, 2026	
MF	(El Salvador) Andrés Hernández	(El Salvador) Alianza	Free transfer	February 5, 2026	
MF	(Cyprus) Christos Hadjipaschalis	(Cyprus) Akritas Chlorakas	Free transfer	February 5, 2026	
FW	(Uganda) Sadat Anaku	(Uganda) KCCA FC	Free transfer	February 13, 2026	
DF	(United States) Britton Fischer	Minnesota United	Loan	March 3, 2026	
DF	(United States) Jack Loura	New York City FC II	Free agent	March 17, 2026	
DF	(United States) Galen Flynn	South Carolina Gamecocks	Free agent	March 17, 2026	
FW	(United States) Spencer Gordon	Academy	Academy contract	March 17, 2026	
MF	(United States) Sean Canada	Farmington High School	Academy contract	March 18, 2026	
FW	(Nigeria) Abdullah Taofeek	(Nigeria) Grassrunners FC	Transfer	March 31, 2026	
DF	(United States) Oscar Pearman	Academy	Academy contract	July 23, 2026	
DF	(Nigeria) Michael Adedokun	Lexington SC	Loan	July 24, 2026	
DF	(United States) Cesar Miranda	Academy	Academy contract	July 25, 2026	

=== Out ===
Pos	Player	Transferred To	Fee	Date	Source
DF	(United States) Joe Farrell	Retired	N/A	December 2, 2025	
MF	(United States) Jonathan Jiménez	Free Agent	End of Contract	December 4, 2025	
MF	(United States) Jack Panayotou	New England Revolution	Loan Ended	December 4, 2025	
DF	(United States) Owen Presthus	Columbus Crew	Loan Ended	December 4, 2025	
FW	(Saint Vincent and the Grenadines) Kyle Edwards	Sacramento Republic	Free Transfer	January 15, 2026	

== Competitions ==
=== Friendlies ===
January 31	New York Red Bulls	2-0	Hartford Athletic	New Jersey
12:00PM	Gjengaar, Sofo	Report		Stadium: New York Red Bulls Training Facility

February 14	New England Revolution	6-1	Hartford Athletic	Foxborough, Massachusetts
1:00 pm ET	Campana 21', 28'; Gil (penalty scored) 48'; Klein 106'; Yusuf 109'; Oyirwoth 111'	Report	(penalty scored) 68'	Stadium: Revolution Training Center
Note: Match was played in three 45-minute periods.

=== USL Championship ===
==== Standings ====
Pos	Team	Pld	W	L	T	GF	GA	GD	Pts	Qualification
4	Louisville City FC	30	13	9	8	51	43	+8	47	Playoffs
5	Pittsburgh Riverhounds SC	30	13	11	6	33	30	+3	45	Playoffs
6	Hartford Athletic	30	10	7	13	35	33	+2	43	Playoffs
7	Rhode Island FC	30	12	12	6	42	33	+9	42	Playoffs
8	Miami FC	30	9	12	9	39	49	−10	36	Playoffs

Updated to match(es) played on October 24, 2026. Source: USL Championship Standings
Rules for classification: 1) total wins against conference opponents; 2) goal differential against conference opponents; 3) goals scored against conference opponents; 4) head-to-head points against conference opponents; 5) points per game against conference opponents; 6) points per game against non-conference opponents; 7) fewest disciplinary points; 8) coin toss or drawing of lots

==== Matches ====
March 7	Sporting Club Jacksonville	0–3	Hartford Athletic	Jacksonville, Florida
7:00 pm ET		Report		Stadium: Hodges Stadium; Attendance: 10,357; Referee: Mathew Corrigan

March 11	Birmingham Legion FC	0–0	Hartford Athletic	Birmingham, Alabama
12:00 pm ET		Report		Stadium: Protective Stadium; Attendance: 3,974; Referee: Ekaterina Koroleva

March 21	Brooklyn FC	1–2	Hartford Athletic	Brooklyn, New York
7:00 pm ET		Report		Stadium: Maimonides Park; Attendance: 2,257; Referee: Thomas Snyder

March 28	Hartford Athletic	2–2	Indy Eleven	Hartford, Connecticut
5:00 pm EST	Anaku 33'; Makangila (yellow card) 82'; O'Brien 88' (o.g.); Diz Pe (yellow card) 90+3'	Report	Herbert (yellow card) 31'; Okello 48'; Mesanvi (yellow card) 66'; Rendón 72'	Stadium: Trinity Health Stadium; Attendance: 2,400; Referee: Elton Garcia

April 4	Miami FC	0–0	Hartford Athletic	Miami, Florida
4:00 pm ET		Report		Stadium: Pitbull Stadium; Attendance: 1,006; Referee: Abdou Ndiaye

April 11	Hartford Athletic	0–4	El Paso Locomotive FC	Hartford, Connecticut
7:00 p.m.		Report	Calvillo 12'; Alfaro 24' (pen.); Abitia 32'; Torres 64'	Stadium: Trinity Health Stadium; Attendance: 3,299; Referee: Calin Radosav

April 18	Hartford Athletic	0–0	Loudoun United FC	Hartford, Connecticut
7:00 PM		Report		Stadium: Trinity Health Stadium; Attendance: 2,745; Referee: Atahan Yaya

May 9	Hartford Athletic	2–1	Detroit City FC	Hartford, Connecticut
7:00 PM	Anderson (yellow card) 7'; Makangila (yellow card) 36'; Rodriguez 59' (o.g.); Diz Pe 89'	Report	Silva (yellow card) 38'; Diop (yellow card) 63'; Diouf (yellow card) 75'; Diz Pe 84' (o.g.)	Stadium: Trinity Health Stadium; Attendance: 1,148; Referee: Nabil Bensalah

May 22	FC Tulsa	2–0	Hartford Athletic	Tulsa, Oklahoma
8:30 pm ET	Webber 45+1' (pen.); Clarke 61'	Report	Careaga (red card) 90+7'	Stadium: Oneok Field; Attendance: 4,212; Referee: Brandon Stevis

May 30	Hartford Athletic	0–0	New Mexico United	Hartford, Connecticut
7:00 pm ET	Makangila (yellow card) 19' (yellow-red card) 87'	Report		Stadium: Trinity Health Stadium; Attendance: 2,256; Referee: Matthew Thompson

June 13	Tampa Bay Rowdies	0–1	Hartford Athletic	St. Petersburg, Florida
7:30 pm ET		Report	Anderson 20'	Stadium: Al Lang Stadium; Attendance: 4,283; Referee: Brad Jensen

June 20	Hartford Athletic	0–0	Pittsburgh Riverhounds SC	Hartford, Connecticut
7:00 pm ET		Report		Stadium: Trinity Health Stadium; Attendance: 4,130; Referee: Jeremy Scheer

July 4	Louisville City FC	1–0	Hartford Athletic	Louisville, Kentucky
8:00 pm ET	Wilson 67'	Report		Stadium: Lynn Family Stadium; Attendance: 10,572; Referee: Atahan Yaya

July 8	Hartford Athletic	2–2	Orange County SC	Hartford, Connecticut
7:00 pm ET	Coffey 69', 85'	Report	Kelly 9'; Sylla 17'	Stadium: Trinity Health Stadium; Attendance: 1,900; Referee: Rodrigo Albuquerque

July 18 El Clamico	Rhode Island FC	1–0	Hartford Athletic	Pawtucket, Rhode Island
7:30 pm ET	Nodarse 20'	Report		Stadium: Centreville Bank Stadium; Attendance: 10,199; Referee: Gerald Flores

July 25	Phoenix Rising FC	0–0	Hartford Athletic	Phoenix, Arizona
10:30 pm ET		Report		Stadium: Phoenix Rising Soccer Stadium; Attendance: 3,380; Referee: Corbyn May

August 1	Loudoun United FC	2–0	Hartford Athletic	Leesburg, Virginia
7:00 pm ET	Aboukoura 45+3'; Úlfarsson 73'	Report		Stadium: Segra Field; Attendance: 1,617; Referee: Benjamin Meyer

August 9	Indy Eleven	1–1	Hartford Athletic	Indianapolis, Indiana
5:00 pm ET	Kizza 3'	Report	Scarlett 74'	Stadium: IU Michael A. Carroll Track & Soccer Stadium; Attendance: 8,147; Referee: Edson Carvajal

August 15	Hartford Athletic	2–1	Miami FC	Hartford, Connecticut
7:00 pm ET		Report		Stadium: Trinity Health Stadium; Attendance: 4,105; Referee: Cristian Campo

August 29	Hartford Athletic	3–2	Birmingham Legion FC	Hartford, Connecticut
7:00 pm ET		Report		Stadium: Trinity Health Stadium; Attendance: 4,059

September 2	Charleston Battery	1–2	Hartford Athletic	Mount Pleasant, South Carolina
7:00 pm ET	Pakhomov 29'; Messer (yellow card) 18' (yellow-red card) 60'	Report	Ngalina 75' (pen.); Coffey 90+7'	Stadium: Patriots Point Soccer Complex; Attendance: 2,816; Referee: Erick Lezama

September 5	Detroit City FC	1–1	Hartford Athletic	Hamtramck, Michigan
7:00 pm ET	Rodriguez 90+5'	Report	Williams 90+10' (pen.)	Stadium: Keyworth Stadium; Attendance: 6,472; Referee: Elvis Osmanovic

September 12	Hartford Athletic	3–1	Tampa Bay Rowdies	Hartford, Connecticut
7:00 pm ET	Adedokun 26'; Anaku 48'; Ngalina 87' (pen.); Moreira (yellow card) 55' (yellow-red card) 88'	Report	Wyke 79'; Pérez (yellow card) 81' (yellow-red card) 90'	Stadium: Trinity Health Stadium; Attendance: 3,908; Referee: Carlos Rodriguez

September 16	Hartford Athletic	2–0	Sporting Club Jacksonville	Hartford, Connecticut
7:00 pm ET	Scarlett 21'; Samadia 83'	Report		Stadium: Trinity Health Stadium; Attendance: 2,958; Referee: Igor Bych

September 19	Las Vegas Lights FC	1–1	Hartford Athletic	Las Vegas, Nevada
10:30 pm ET	Arteaga 70'	Report	Ngalina 33' (pen.)	Stadium: Cashman Field; Referee: Joe Surgan

September 25	Hartford Athletic	2–2	Louisville City FC	Hartford, Connecticut
7:00 pm ET	Williams 11' (pen.); Fischer (yellow card) 50' (yellow-red card) 51'; Ngalina 73' (pen.)	Report	Morris 48'; Huerman 53' (pen.)	Stadium: Trinity Health Stadium; Attendance: 3,339; Referee: Mark Verso

October 3	Hartford Athletic	v	Charleston Battery	Hartford, Connecticut
7:00 pm		Report		Stadium: Trinity Health Stadium
Note: Rescheduled due to inclement weather.

October 10	Pittsburgh Riverhounds SC	2–1	Hartford Athletic	Pittsburgh, Pennsylvania
7:00 pm ET	Amann 6'; Ahl 66'	Report	Ngalina 41'	Stadium: Highmark Stadium; Attendance: 5,110; Referee: Atahan Yaya

October 14	Hartford Athletic	1–1	Charleston Battery	Hartford, Connecticut
7:00 pm	Williams 42'	Report	Njie 75' (o.g.)	Stadium: Trinity Health Stadium; Attendance: 2,457; Referee: Muhammad Hassan
Note: Rescheduled match that was due to be played on October 3.

October 17	Hartford Athletic	2–3	Brooklyn FC	Hartford, Connecticut
7:00 pm ET	Adedokun 21'; Anaku 57'	Report	Fontana (yellow card) 43' (yellow-red card) 73'; Kanté 55'; Klein 63'; Olney 79'	Stadium: Trinity Health Stadium; Referee: Nicholas Strednak

October 24	Hartford Athletic	v 2–1	Rhode Island FC	Hartford, Connecticut
7:00 pm ET	Anaku 68'; Samadia 78'	Report	Yao 25'	Stadium: Trinity Health Stadium; Attendance: 4,775; Referee: Abdou Ndiaye

=== USL Championship playoffs ===
As the sixth seed in the Eastern Conference, Hartford qualified for the playoffs, matched up away against Detroit City FC. After winning off of two goals by Sadat Anaku, Hartford made it to the conference semi-finals against the Charleston Battery, where the club eventually fell in penalties despite having held the Battery to a shutout and leading by three goals up to the 79th minute, ending their 2026 season.

October 30 East Quarter-finals	Detroit City FC	1–2	Hartford Athletic	Hamtramck, Michigan
8:00 PM ET	Hernandez-Foster (red card) 19'; Dichio (yellow card) 25'; Amoo-Mensah 45'	Report	Anaku 33', 75'	Stadium: Keyworth Stadium; Attendance: 7,027; Referee: Elton Garcia

November 7 East Semi-finals	Charleston Battery	3–3 (a.e.t.) (5–4 p)	Hartford Athletic	Mount Pleasant, South Carolina
6:30 PM ET	Ycaza 79' (pen.); Swan 83'; Pakhomov 90+7' (yellow card) 90+8'; Smith (yellow card) 95'	Report	Ngalina 13'; Coffey 16'; Moreira (yellow card) 20'; Anaku 31'; Siaha (yellow card) 80'; Burke (yellow card) 88'	Stadium: Patriots Point Soccer Complex; Attendance: 5,228; Referee: Brandon Stevis
	Penalties
	Houssou (penalty scored); Berry (penalty scored); Pakhomov (penalty scored); Ycaza (penalty scored); Kelly (penalty scored)		(penalty scored) Presthus; (penalty scored) Scarlett; (penalty scored) Careaga; (penalty scored) Adedokun; (penalty missed) Williams

=== U.S. Open Cup ===
March 21 First Round	FC Motown	0–2	Hartford Athletic	Newark, New Jersey
7:00 pm ET		Report		Stadium: Lubetkin Field; Attendance: 206; Referee: Devin Dragon

April 1 Second Round	Rhode Island FC (USLC)	2–0	(Connecticut) Hartford Athletic (USLC)	Pawtucket, Rhode Island
7:00 p.m. ET	Sanchez 12'; Williams 30'	Report		Stadium: Centreville Bank Stadium; Attendance: 4,857; Referee: John Matto

=== USL Cup ===
==== Table ====
Pos	Lg	Team	Pld	W	PKW	PKL	L	GF	GA	GD	Pts	Qualification
1	USLC	Hartford Athletic	4	3	0	1	0	8	2	+6	10	Advance to knockout stage
2	USLC	Rhode Island FC	4	1	2	0	1	5	3	+2	7	
3	USLC	Brooklyn FC	4	2	0	1	1	9	4	+5	7	
4	USL1	Portland Hearts of Pine	4	1	1	1	1	6	9	−3	6	
5	USL1	New York Cosmos	4	1	0	1	2	5	10	−5	4	
6	USL1	Westchester SC	4	0	1	0	3	5	10	−5	2	

==== Group stage ====
April 25	Hartford Athletic	0–0 (3–4 p)	Rhode Island FC	Hartford, Connecticut
7:00 p.m.		Report		Stadium: Trinity Health Stadium; Attendance: 2,983; Referee: Muhammad Kaleia
	Penalties
	Diz (penalty scored); Coffey (penalty missed); Real (penalty scored); Scarlett (penalty scored); Careaga (penalty missed)		(penalty scored) Diop; (penalty missed) Bacharach; (penalty scored) Rodríguez; (penalty scored) Scardina; (penalty scored) Yao

May 16	Brooklyn FC	0–2	Hartford Athletic	Brooklyn, New York
7:00 p.m.		Report	Careaga 63'; Ngalina 86'	Stadium: Maimonides Park; Attendance: 1,259; Referee: Luis Arroyo

June 6	New York Cosmos	1–4	Hartford Athletic	Paterson, New Jersey
7:00 p.m.	Chavez 87'	Report	Williams 11'; Coffey 40'; Samadia 45'; Hernández 88'	Stadium: Hinchliffe Stadium; Attendance: 1,159; Referee: John Matto

July 11	Hartford Athletic	2–1	Westchester SC	Hartford, Connecticut
7:00 pm ET		Report		Stadium: Trinity Health Stadium; Attendance: 1,639; Referee: Alyssa Pennington

==== Knockouts ====
August 12 Quarterfinal	Charlotte Independence	2–4	Hartford Athletic	Matthews, North Carolina
7:00 p.m.		Report		Stadium: Sportsplex at Matthews; Attendance: 655; Referee: Katja Koroleva

September 8 Semifinal	Hartford Athletic	2–1	Colorado Springs Switchbacks	Hartford, Connecticut
7:00 p.m.	Coffey 3'; Diz 37'	Report	Fjeldberg 82'	Stadium: Trinity Health Stadium; Attendance: 2,611; Referee: Muhammad Hassan

October 4 Final	Hartford Athletic	0–1	Louisville City FC	Hartford, Connecticut
3:00 pm ET				Stadium: Trinity Health Stadium; Attendance: 6,179
