= Barry Coffey (soccer) =

Irish soccer player (born 2001)

Personal information
- Full name: Barry Coffey
- Date of birth: March 27, 2001 (age 25)
- Place of birth: Nenagh, County Tipperary, Ireland
- Height: 5 ft 11 in (1.80 m)
- Position: Midfielder

Team information
- Current team: Hartford Athletic

Youth career
- Nenagh AFC
- 2018–2021: Celtic

Senior career*
Years	Team	Apps	(Gls)
2021	Celtic	0	(0)
2021	→ Cliftonville (loan)	16	(2)
2021–2022	→ Cork City (loan)	26	(10)
2022–2024	Cork City	69	(17)
2025	Cobh Ramblers	37	(26)
2026–	Hartford Athletic	22	(6)

International career^{‡}
2015–2016	Republic of Ireland U15	2	(0)
2017–2018	Republic of Ireland U17	11	(1)
2018–2019	Republic of Ireland U18	5	(1)
2018–2019	Republic of Ireland U19	7	(1)
- * Club domestic league appearances and goals as of October 6, 2026 ‡ National team caps and goals as of October 6, 2026

Barry Coffey (born March 27, 2001) is an Irish soccer player who plays for USL Championship club Hartford Athletic.

== Career ==
Coffey joined the academy of Scottish giants Celtic F.C. from his hometown Nenagh AFC in 2017, appearing twice for the B team in the Scottish Challenge Cup.

=== Loans to Cliftonville and Cork City ===
His first loan came in 2021, where he joined Northern Irish club Cliftonville. His loan ended on June 10, after he scored 2 goals in 18 appearances across all competitions. In July, he joined Irish club Cork City on loan for the remainder of the 2021 season. In January 2022, his loan was extended until June.

=== Permanent move to Cork City ===
In July 2022 following his loan spell, Coffey signed with Cork City on a permanent deal for the rest of the season. He signed a contract extension ahead of the 2023 season. He then signed another extension ahead of the 2024 season.

In total, Coffey made 101 appearances across all competitions during his time at Cork, scoring 28 goals.

Coffey left the club following the 2024 season.

=== Cobh Ramblers ===
Coffey joined Cobh Ramblers ahead of the 2025 season. Coffey scored 26 goals in the 2025 season, winning First Division Player of the Year. In December 2025, Cobh Ramblers Director of Football, Conor Meade, confirmed on a podcast that Coffey would not return to the club.

=== Hartford Athletic ===
In January 2026, Coffey joined USL Championship club Hartford Athletic ahead of their 2026 season.
