= Cole Dewhurst =

American association football player

Personal information
- Full name: Cole Dewhurst
- Date of birth: June 23, 2003 (age 23)
- Place of birth: Beverly, Massachusetts, United States
- Height: 6 ft 2 in (1.88 m)
- Position: Defender

Team information
- Current team: Rhode Island FC
- Number: 16

Youth career
- FC Stars
- 2016–2021: New England Revolution

College career
Years	Team	Apps	(Gls)
2021–2025	Providence Friars	67	(3)

Senior career*
Years	Team	Apps	(Gls)
2021	New England Revolution II	1	(0)
2025–	Rhode Island FC	0	(0)
- * Club domestic league appearances and goals as of 13:32, 8 October 2021 (UTC)

Cole Dewhurst (born June 23, 2003) is an American soccer player who plays as a defender for Rhode Island FC. Before his professional career, Dewhurst started and played in 67 games for the Providence Friars Men’s Soccer Team.

== Career ==
Born in Beverly, Massachusetts, Dewhurst is the son of Sarah and former footballer Jason Dewhurst. He has one sister, Chloe Dewhurst who is a high jumper at Springfield College. She was named All-American at the 2022 NCAA Indoor Track National Championship where she placed 6th in the high jump. He began his career at FC Stars before joining the New England Revolution academy in 2016. On April 27, 2020, it was announced that Dewhurst had committed to playing college soccer for the Providence Friars.

In March 2021, it was announced that Dewhurst would be part of the Revolution's reserve side, New England Revolution II, in USL League One. He made his debut with the side on April 10, 2021, in their opening match against Fort Lauderdale CF, Dewhurst coming on as an 82nd-minute substitute in a 1–0 victory.

In the fall of 2021, Dewhurst made the move to Providence College to play college soccer.

== Career statistics ==
As of match played April 10, 2021

Appearances and goals by club, season and competition
Club	Season	League			Cup		Continental		Total	
Club	Season	Division	Apps	Goals	Apps	Goals	Apps	Goals	Apps	Goals
New England Revolution II	2021	USL League One	1	0	—		—		1	0
Career total			1	0	0	0	0	0	1	0
