= Amos Shapiro-Thompson =

American soccer player (born 2000)

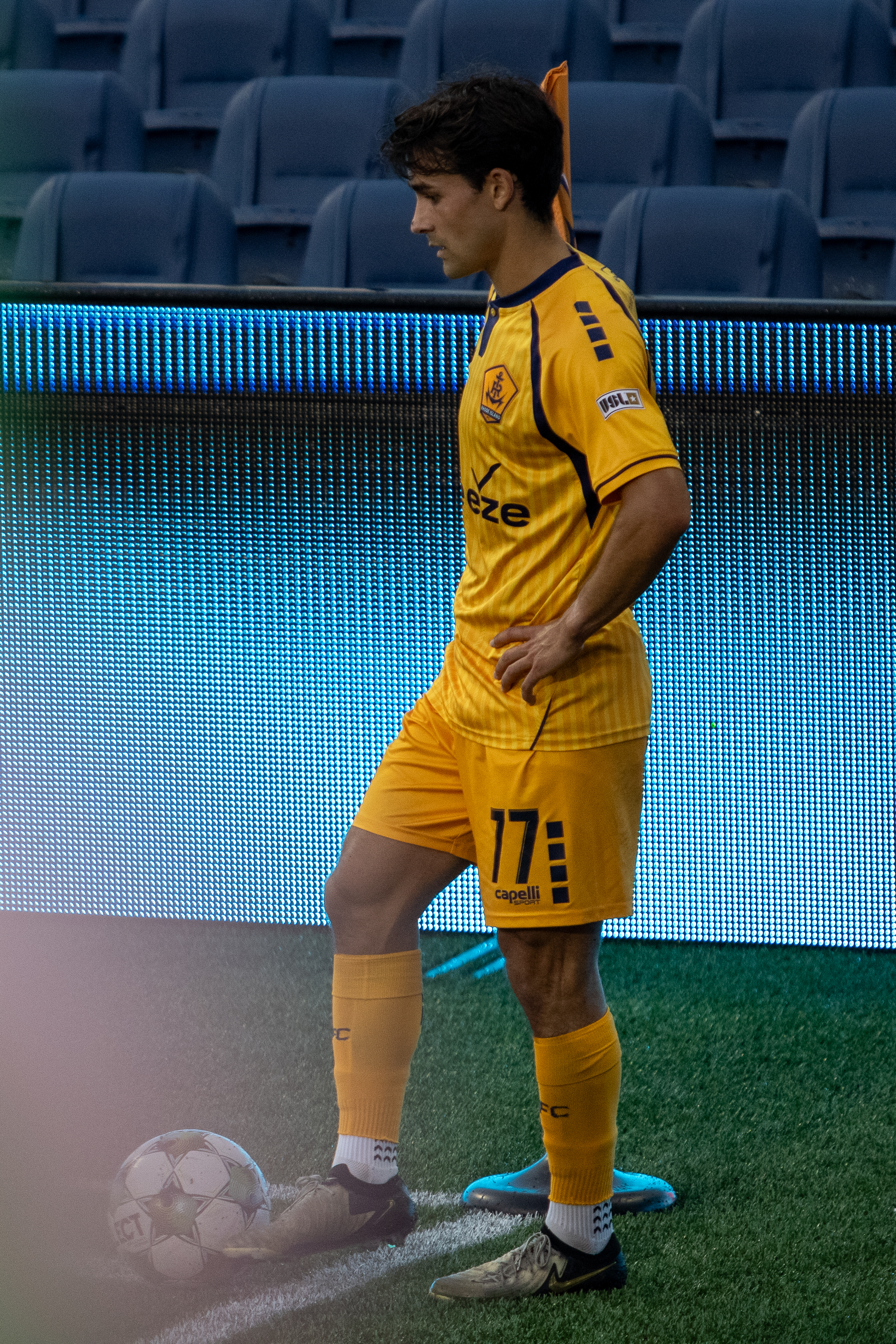

Personal information
- Full name: Amos Daniel Shapiro-Thompson
- Date of birth: January 11, 2000 (age 26)
- Place of birth: Worthington, Massachusetts, United States
- Height: 1.73 m (5 ft 8 in)
- Position: Midfielder

Team information
- Current team: Rhode Island FC
- Number: 77

Youth career
- 2013–2016: New England Revolution
- 2017–2018: Dinamo Zagreb
- 2018: Legia Warsaw

College career
Years	Team	Apps	(Gls)
2019–2022	Boston College Eagles	43	(7)

Senior career*
Years	Team	Apps	(Gls)
2018–2019	Legia Warsaw II	25	(0)
2021	Western Mass Pioneers	0	(0)
2023	New York Red Bulls II	20	(1)
2023	→ New York Red Bulls (loan)	1	(0)
2024–	Rhode Island FC	53	(1)
- * Club domestic league appearances and goals as of 15:22, 8 November 2026 (UTC)

Amos Daniel Shapiro-Thompson (born 11 January 2000) is an American soccer player currently playing as a midfielder for Rhode Island FC.

== Club career ==
=== Early career ===
Born in Worthington, Massachusetts, Shapiro-Thompson began his career with New England Revolution, also studying at the Milton Academy in Milton, Massachusetts. He moved to Spain with a school programme that the Milton Academy offered, before moving again in 2017, joining the academy of professional side Dinamo Zagreb in Croatia.

The following year, he joined Polish side Legia Warsaw on a reserve contract, alongside compatriot Brian Iloski, and following technical director Ivan Kepčija, who had held the same role at Dinamo Zagreb. He left the club in July 2019, having played for their reserve team in the III liga.

=== Collegiate soccer ===
On his return to the United States, he enrolled at the Boston College, playing for the school soccer team, the Boston College Eagles. In his first season with the Eagles, he made fifteen appearances, being nominated for the All-ACC Freshman Team. The following season was curtailed by the COVID-19 pandemic in Boston, with Shapiro-Thompson having made six appearances, scoring once. After another six appearances the following year, he suffered a torn ACL, but managed to recover to make sixteen appearances as a senior. During his time at the college, he also played for Western Mass Pioneers in the USL League Two, though he only made one appearance, in the 2021 USL League Two Playoffs.

=== Professional ===
Shapiro-Thompson was drafted in the third round of the 2023 MLS SuperDraft by the New York Red Bulls as the 79th overall pick. He was assigned to the club's reserve team, the New York Red Bulls II in the MLS Next Pro, but in May 2023, he was loaned back to the first team ahead of the U.S. Open Cup game against D.C. United.

== International career ==
Shapiro-Thompson was called up to the United States under-14 and under-15 sides for training during his youth career.

== Career statistics ==
As of December 23, 2022.

Appearances and goals by club, season and competition
Club	Season	League			National cup (Note: Includes U.S. Open Cup)		Continental		Other		Total	
Club	Season	Division	Apps	Goals	Apps	Goals	Apps	Goals	Apps	Goals	Apps	Goals
Legia Warsaw II	2017–18	III liga, gr. I	10	0	—		—		0	0	10	0
Legia Warsaw II	2018–19	III liga, gr. I	15	0	—		—		0	0	15	0
Legia Warsaw II	Total		25	0	0	0	0	0	0	0	25	0
Western Mass Pioneers	2021	USL League Two	0	0	—		—		1 (Note: Appearances in the 2021 USL League Two Playoffs)	0	1	0
New York Red Bulls II	2023	MLS Next Pro	16	1	—		—		0	0	16	1
New York Red Bulls (loan)	2023	MLS	0	0	1	0	—		0	0	1	0
Career total			42	1	1	0	0	0	1	0	44	1

== Honours ==
Legia Warsaw II

- Polish Cup (Masovia regionals): 2018–19
