= Christos Chatzipaschalis =

Cypriot footballer (born 1999)

Christos Hadjipaschalis
Personal information
- Full name: Christos Hadjipaschalis
- Date of birth: 1 August 1999 (age 27)
- Place of birth: Nicosia, Cyprus
- Height: 1.81 m (5 ft 11 in)
- Position: Midfielder

Team information
- Current team: Hartford Athletic

Youth career
- –2015: Anorthosis Famagusta

Senior career*
Years	Team	Apps	(Gls)
2015–2020	Anorthosis	4	(0)
2018–2019	→ Aris Limassol (loan)	27	(4)
2019–2020	→ ASIL Lysi (loan)	19	(1)
2020–2021	POX FC	33	(1)
2021–2022	Nea Salamina	9	(1)
2022–2024	Othellos	54	(6)
2024–2025	AEZ Zakakiou	25	(2)
2025	Akritas Chlorakas	9	(0)
2026–	Hartford Athletic	11	(0)

International career^{‡}
2015	Cyprus U17	3	(0)
2016–2017	Cyprus U19	4	(0)
2018–2020	Cyprus U21	9	(0)
- * Club domestic league appearances and goals as of 22:55, 4 November 2026 (UTC) ‡ National team caps and goals as of 09:48, 14 November 2018 (UTC)

Christos Hadjipaschalis (Greek: Χρίστος Χατζηπασχάλης; born 1 August 1999) is a Cypriot footballer who plays as a midfielder for Hartford Athletic in the USL Championship.

== Career ==
On 15 May 2016, Hadjipaschalis made his league debut for Anorthosis, playing the last 12 minutes in a 2–2 draw with APOEL.

In February 2026, Hadjipaschalis joined Hartford Athletic ahead of the 2026 USL Championship season.
