= Clay Holstad =

American soccer player (born 2000)

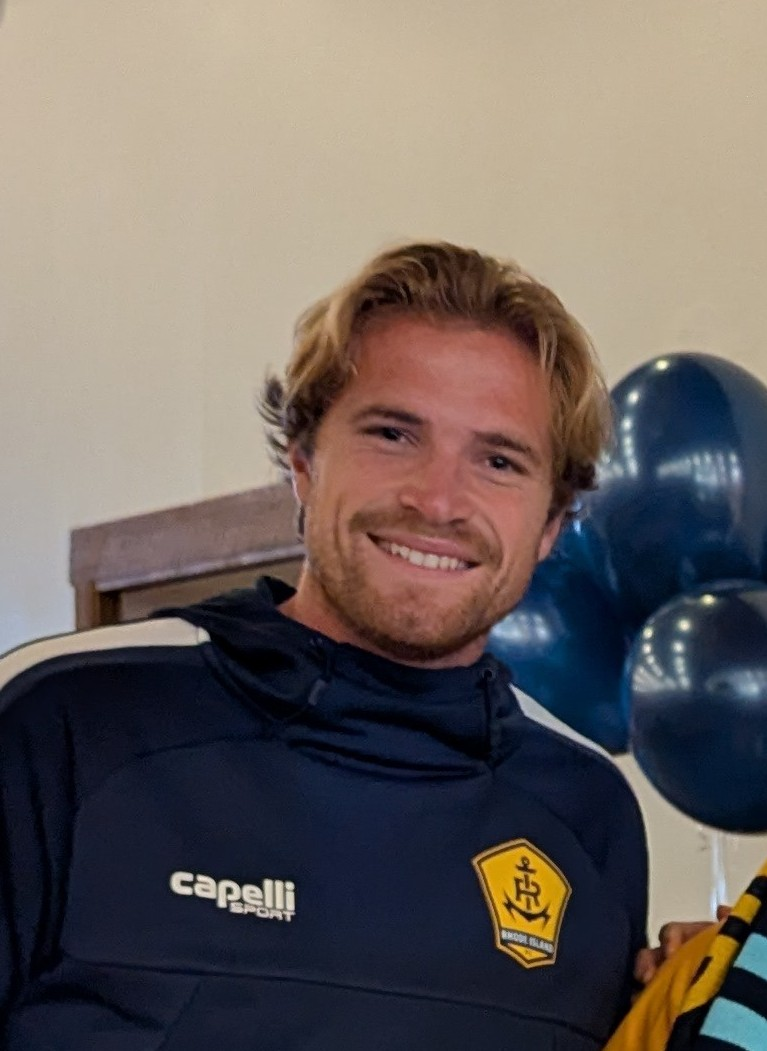

Personal information
- Full name: Clay Holstad
- Date of birth: January 12, 2000 (age 26)
- Place of birth: Birmingham, Alabama, U.S.
- Height: 6 ft 2 in (1.88 m)
- Position: Midfielder

Team information
- Current team: FC Dallas (on loan from Rhode Island FC)
- Number: 12

Youth career
- 2018: Birmingham United

College career
Years	Team	Apps	(Gls)
2018–2022	Kentucky Wildcats	85	(5)

Senior career*
Years	Team	Apps	(Gls)
2019	Dalton Red Wolves SC	10	(2)
2023	Columbus Crew 2	26	(1)
2024–	Rhode Island FC	63	(6)
2026–	→ FC Dallas (loan)	0	(0)
- * Club domestic league appearances and goals as of October 25, 2025

Clay Holstad (born January 12, 2000) is an American professional soccer player who plays as a midfielder for Major League Soccer club FC Dallas, on loan from USL Championship club Rhode Island FC.

== Early life and education ==
Holstad was born in Birmingham, Alabama and played youth soccer for Birmingham United. He attended Oak Mountain High School, where he was recognized for his performances in high school soccer.

Holstad played collegiate soccer at the University of Kentucky from 2018 to 2022, appearing in 85 matches and scoring five goals. He was part of Kentucky teams that achieved a national ranking as high as third and played a role in the program’s success in the NCAA Tournament. In 2022, he was named to the NCAA All-Southeast Region Second Team and was the Most Outstanding Player of the Sun Belt Conference Tournament. He earned a degree in chemical engineering in 2022.

== Club career ==
=== Columbus Crew 2 ===
Holstad was selected in the second round (43rd overall) of the 2023 MLS SuperDraft by the Columbus Crew. He signed his first professional contract with Columbus Crew 2 in MLS Next Pro in March 2023.

During the 2023 season, he made 26 appearances, recorded one goal, and played 1,761 minutes.

=== Rhode Island FC ===
In January 2024, Holstad signed with Rhode Island FC ahead of the club’s inaugural season in the USL Championship. He was part of Rhode Island FC’s first match in March 2024 and played 33 games during the regular season, scoring four goals. Holstad was included in the USL Championship Team of the Week early in the season.

At the conclusion of the 2024 season, Rhode Island FC exercised his contract option for the following year.

Holstad remained with Rhode Island through the 2025 season and the first part of 2026. He became the club's all-time appearance leader, making 96 appearances across all competitions and recording 10 goals and eight assists.

=== FC Dallas ===
On July 27, 2026, Holstad joined Major League Soccer club FC Dallas on loan through December 2026, with Dallas holding an option for a permanent transfer. The move reunited him with Dallas head coach Eric Quill, who had coached Holstad at Texans SC during his youth career.

== Personal life ==
Holstad has known fellow soccer player JJ Williams since childhood, as both grew up playing soccer in Birmingham, Alabama.
