= Samuel Careaga =

Argentine footballer (born 2002)

Personal information
- Full name: Samuel Alejandro Careaga
- Date of birth: June 9, 2002 (age 24)
- Place of birth: Avellaneda, Argentina
- Height: 5 ft 10 in (1.78 m)
- Position: Midfielder

Team information
- Current team: Hartford Athletic
- Number: 10

Youth career
- Lanús

Senior career*
Years	Team	Apps	(Gls)
2022–2025	Lanús	17	(0)
2023–2024	→ Memphis 901 (loan)	37	(10)
2025	→ Hartford Athletic (loan)	25	(2)
2026–	Hartford Athletic	8	(1)
- * Club domestic league appearances and goals as of 22:52, 4 November 2026 (UTC)

Samuel Alejandro Careaga (born 9 June 2002) is an Argentine footballer who currently plays for USL Championship club Hartford Athletic.

== Career ==
=== Lanús ===
Careaga began his career with Lanús, who he signed a professional deal with in 2022, making his debut on 24 April 2022 in a 1–1 draw with Godoy Cruz. He signed on an 18-month loan deal with USL Championship side Memphis 901 on 4 September 2023. 901 FC folded following the 2024 USL Championship season and Lanús subsequently loaned Careaga to Hartford Athletic on 6 January 2025.

=== Hartford Athletic ===
==== Initial Loan ====
Careaga scored the only goal in Hartford's 1–0 win over Sacramento Republic FC in the 2025 USL Cup final.

==== Permanent Move ====
On 16 January 2026, it was announced that Careaga had signed a permanent contract with the USL side. In the first match of the 2026 campaign, Careaga scored the second in what would become a 3–0 win against the newly joined club Sporting Club Jacksonville.
