= Marc Ybarra =

American soccer player (born 1998)

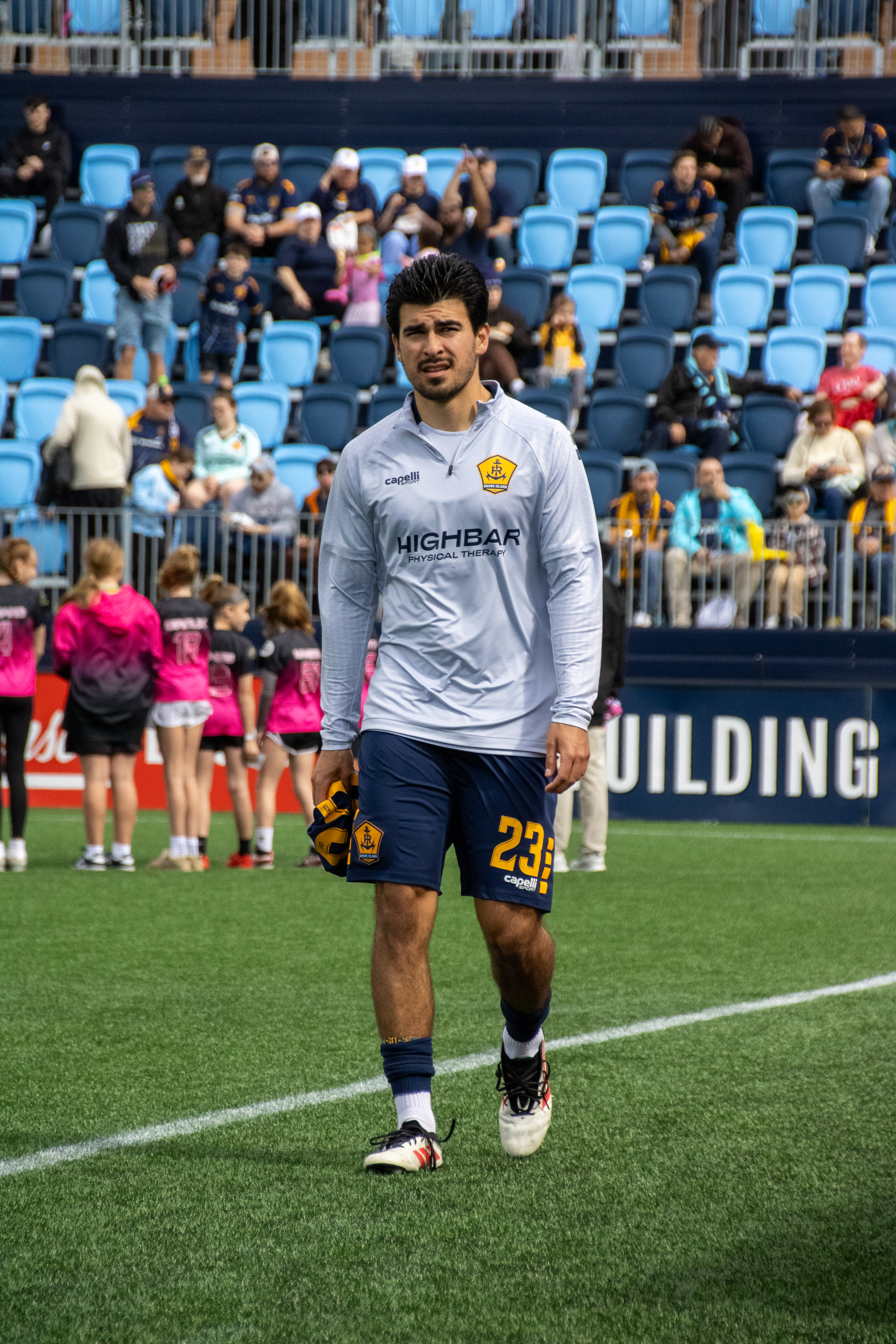
- Ybarra with Rhode Island FC during the 2025 season

Personal information
- Date of birth: December 18, 1998 (age 27)
- Place of birth: Ann Arbor, Michigan, United States
- Height: 1.83 m (6 ft 0 in)
- Position: Midfielder

Team information
- Current team: Las Vegas Lights
- Number: 23

Youth career
- 2013–2017: Crew Soccer Academy Wolves

College career
| Years | Team | Apps | (Gls) |
| 2017–2021 | Michigan Wolverines | 91 | (9) |

Senior career*
| Years | Team | Apps | (Gls) |
| 2018 | AFC Ann Arbor | 9 | (2) |
| 2019 | Flint City Bucks | 6 | (0) |
| 2022–2023 | Pittsburgh Riverhounds | 57 | (1) |
| 2024–2025 | Rhode Island FC | 53 | (1) |
| 2026– | Las Vegas Lights | 25 | (1) |
- * Club domestic league appearances and goals as of 10:21, 9 November 2026 (UTC)

Marc Ybarra (born December 18, 1998) is an American soccer player who currently plays as a midfielder for Las Vegas Lights in the USL Championship.

== College & Amateur career ==
Ybarra attended Ann Arbor Skyline, but never played high school soccer for the Eagles, instead playing club soccer with Crew Soccer Academy Wolves between 2013 and 2017. Ybarra played in the Generation Adidas Cup with Columbus Crew, winning their division of U.S. Soccer Development Academy.

In 2017, Ybarra attended the University of Michigan to play college soccer. During his time with the Wolverines, Ybarra made 91 appearances, scoring nine goals and tallying 24 assists. He holds the Michigan record for number of games played and games started, as well as total minutes on the pitch. Ybarra is also second in all-time Michigan assists. He earned numerous accolades, including; Big Ten Midfielder of the Year in 2021, Big Ten All-Tournament Team in 2021, Big Ten All-Freshman Team in 2017, and a Four-time Academic All-Big Ten winner.

During his time at college, Ybarra also played in the National Premier Soccer League with AFC Ann Arbor during their 2018 season, scoring two goals in nine appearances, helping them to win the Great Lakes Conference. In 2019, he played in the USL League Two with Flint City Bucks, making six appearances in the regular season and one playoff appearance as the Bucks went on to become the 2019 USL League Two season champions.

== Club career ==
=== Pittsburgh Riverhounds ===
On February 24, 2022, Ybarra signed his first professional contract, joining USL Championship club Pittsburgh Riverhounds prior to their 2022 season. He made his professional debut on March 12, 2022, starting in a 3–0 win over Memphis 901.

=== Rhode Island FC ===
On December 14, 2023, Ybarra was announced to have signed a contract with expansion club Rhode Island FC as part of their inaugural squad.

=== Las Vegas Lights FC ===
On 28 January 2026, Las Vegas Lights FC announced they had signed Ybarra to a contract for the 2026 USL Championship season.

== Honors ==
=== Club ===
Flint City Bucks

- USL League Two: 2019
