= Matthew Corcoran =

American soccer player (born 2006)

- Corcoran with Nashville SC in 2026

Personal information
- Full name: Matthew Corcoran
- Date of birth: February 17, 2006 (age 20)
- Place of birth: Dallas, Texas, United States
- Height: 5 ft 10 in (1.78 m)
- Position: Midfielder

Team information
- Current team: Nashville SC
- Number: 16

Youth career
- –2018: Dallas Texans
- 2018–2021: FC Dallas

Senior career*
Years	Team	Apps	(Gls)
2021	North Texas SC	2	(0)
2022–2024	Birmingham Legion	58	(2)
2025–	Nashville SC	29	(0)
2025	Huntsville City FC	1	(0)
2025	→ Rhode Island FC (loan)	4	(0)

International career^{‡}
2023	United States U17	3	(0)
2023	United States U20	10	(1)
- * Club domestic league appearances and goals as of September 9, 2025 ‡ National team caps and goals as of October 10, 2025

Matthew Corcoran (born February 17, 2006) is an American professional soccer player who plays as a midfielder for Major League Soccer club Nashville SC.

== Club career ==
Corcoran began his career with the Dallas Texans before joining the youth academy at FC Dallas. In November 2020, he was called up to train with the FC Dallas reserve side, North Texas SC. On April 24, 2021, he made his senior debut for North Texas SC in their USL League One opener against Fort Lauderdale CF, coming on as a 59th-minute substitute in a 4–2 victory.

On January 14, 2022, Corcoran signed with Birmingham Legion FC of the USL Championship. On May 28, 2022, he made his debut against Red Bull New York II as a 88th-minute substitute in a 2–1 victory. He scored his first senior goal against the Pittsburgh Riverhounds on May 14, 2023, bringing Legion back to 1–1 in the 35th minute. Birmingham would eventually lose the game 2–1.

On February 11, 2025, Corcoran was transferred to Major League Soccer side Nashville SC for an undisclosed fee. He scored for the side in a 2–2 friendly draw against Aston Villa F.C..

On August 5, 2025, Corcoran joined Rhode Island FC on loan, the club announced on their Instagram page. He made his debut for the side on August 7th, 2025 in a 1–0 win against USL Championship side Detroit City FC. Nashville recalled Corcoran from his loan on September 9, 2025.

== Career statistics ==
=== Club ===
As of June 21, 2023

Appearances and goals by club, season and competition
Club	Season	League			National cup		Continental		Total	
Club	Season	Division	Apps	Goals	Apps	Goals	Apps	Goals	Apps	Goals
North Texas SC	2021	USL League One	2	0	—		—		2	0
Birmingham Legion	2022	USL Championship	11	0	0	0	0	0	11	0
Birmingham Legion	2023	USL Championship	12	1	3	0	0	0	15	1
Nashville SC	2025	Major League Soccer	7	0	2	0	0	0	9	0
Nashville SC	2026	Major League Soccer	22	0	0	0	8	0	30	0
Rhode Island FC	2025	USL Championship	2	0	0	0	0	0	1	0
Career total			56	1	5	0	0	0	68	1
