= Joe Brito =

American soccer player

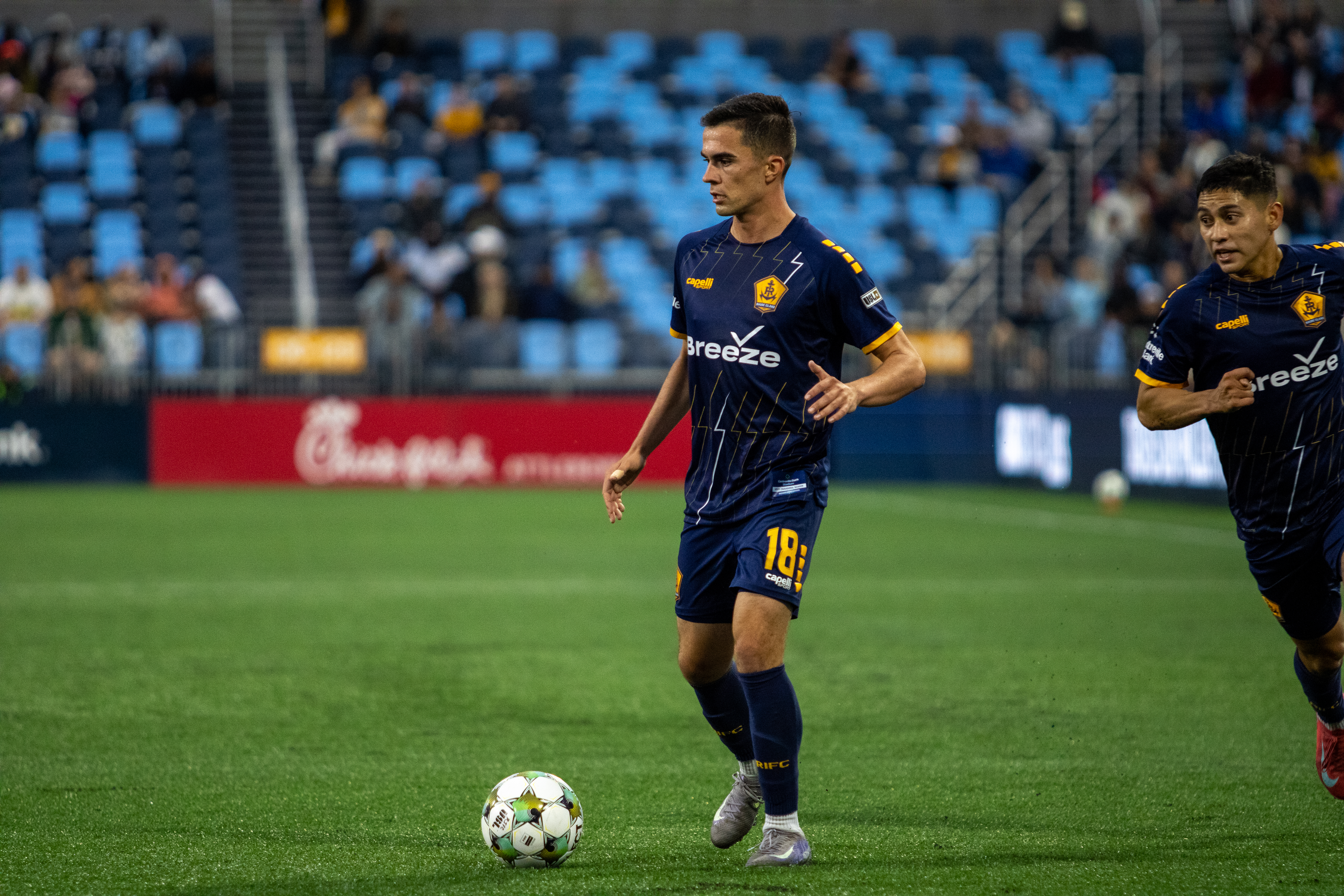
- Brito playing for Rhode Island FC a 2025 USL Championship match

Personal information
- Full name: Joseph Marques Brito
- Date of birth: February 17, 1999 (age 27)
- Place of birth: Hartford, Connecticut, United States
- Height: 1.80 m (5 ft 11 in)
- Position: Midfielder

Youth career
- 2013–2017: New England Revolution

College career
Years	Team	Apps	(Gls)
2017–2021	Charlotte 49ers	87	(13)

Senior career*
Years	Team	Apps	(Gls)
2022–2023	Union Omaha	60	(7)
2024–2025	Rhode Island FC	54	(4)
- * Club domestic league appearances and goals as of October 25, 2025

Joseph Marques Brito (born February 17, 1999) is an American professional soccer player who played as a midfielder.

== Career ==
=== Youth and college ===
Brito attended Bolton High School, and played as part of the New England Revolution academy between 2013 and 2017. Brito was named the Revolution Academy Player of the Year in 2016–17, after earning a spot on the U-18 Eastern Conference Best XI. During that season, Brito scored 16 goals in 25 appearances.

In 2017, Brito attended the University of North Carolina at Charlotte to play college soccer. Brito redshirted his senior year, but went on to make a total of 87 appearances for the 49ers, scoring 13 goals and tallying 23 assists. During his college career, Brito was a two-time All-Conference USA First Team selection and Conference USA All-Freshman team honors.

=== Professional ===
On March 22, 2022, Brito signed his first professional contract, joining USL League One side Union Omaha. He made his debut on April 9, 2022, starting in a 2–2 draw with Forward Madison.

In 2022, he scored two regular season goals, and also scored the game-winning goal in Union Omaha's U.S. Open Cup match against MLS side Minnesota United. Brito was named "Player of the Round" in the fifth round of the Cup. He helped the team become the first Third Division team to reach the Open Cup quarterfinals since 2013.

Brito scored five regular-season goals, as his 2023 Union Omaha squad won the USL League One Players' Shield.

In December 2023, Brito joined Rhode Island FC ahead of their inaugural USL Championship season. He played two years for Rhode Island, scoring four goals. He appeared in 54 regular-season games, starting nine of them. As a member of RIFC, he won the 2024 USL Eastern Conference championship.

Brito scored the first regular-season goal at Centreville Bank Stadium on May 10, 2025. Though this was Brito's only goal of the season, it was RIFC's "Goal of the Year," and was a finalist in the USL Championship-wide goal of the year contest.

Brito announced his retirement from professional soccer on December 2, 2025.
