= Emmanuel Samadia =

Sierra Leonean footballer (born 2001)

Personal information
- Date of birth: 19 April 2001 (age 25)
- Place of birth: Freetown, Sierra Leone
- Position: Midfielder

Team information
- Current team: Hartford Athletic
- Number: 19

Senior career*
Years	Team	Apps	(Gls)
2019–2021	F.C. Kallon		
2021–2022	Hapoel Umm al-Fahm	50	(2)
2022–2023	Hapoel Rishon LeZion	33	(0)
2024–	Hartford Athletic	65	(2)

International career^{‡}
- Sierra Leone U20
2020–	Sierra Leone	28	(0)
- * Club domestic league appearances and goals as of 22:55, 4 November 2026 (UTC) ‡ National team caps and goals as of 01:12, 10 October 2025 (UTC)

Emmanuel Samadia (born 19 April 2001) is a Sierra Leonean footballer who plays as a midfielder for USL Championship club Hartford Athletic and the Sierra Leone national team.

== Club career ==
After playing for F.C. Kallon in Sierra Leone, he joined Israeli Liga Leumit club Hapoel Umm al-Fahm on a one-month trial in December 2020 and signed a two-year contract with the club in January 2021.

On 28 November 2023, Samadia signed with American USL Championship club Hartford Athletic. In July, 2026, Samadia signed a two-year contract extension with Hartford keeping him with the club through the 2028 season.

== International career ==
He made his debut for the Sierra Leone national team in October 2020 against Niger. He played for Sierra Leone U20 at the 2020 WAFU U-20 Championship.
