= Frank Nodarse =

Cuban footballer (born 2000)

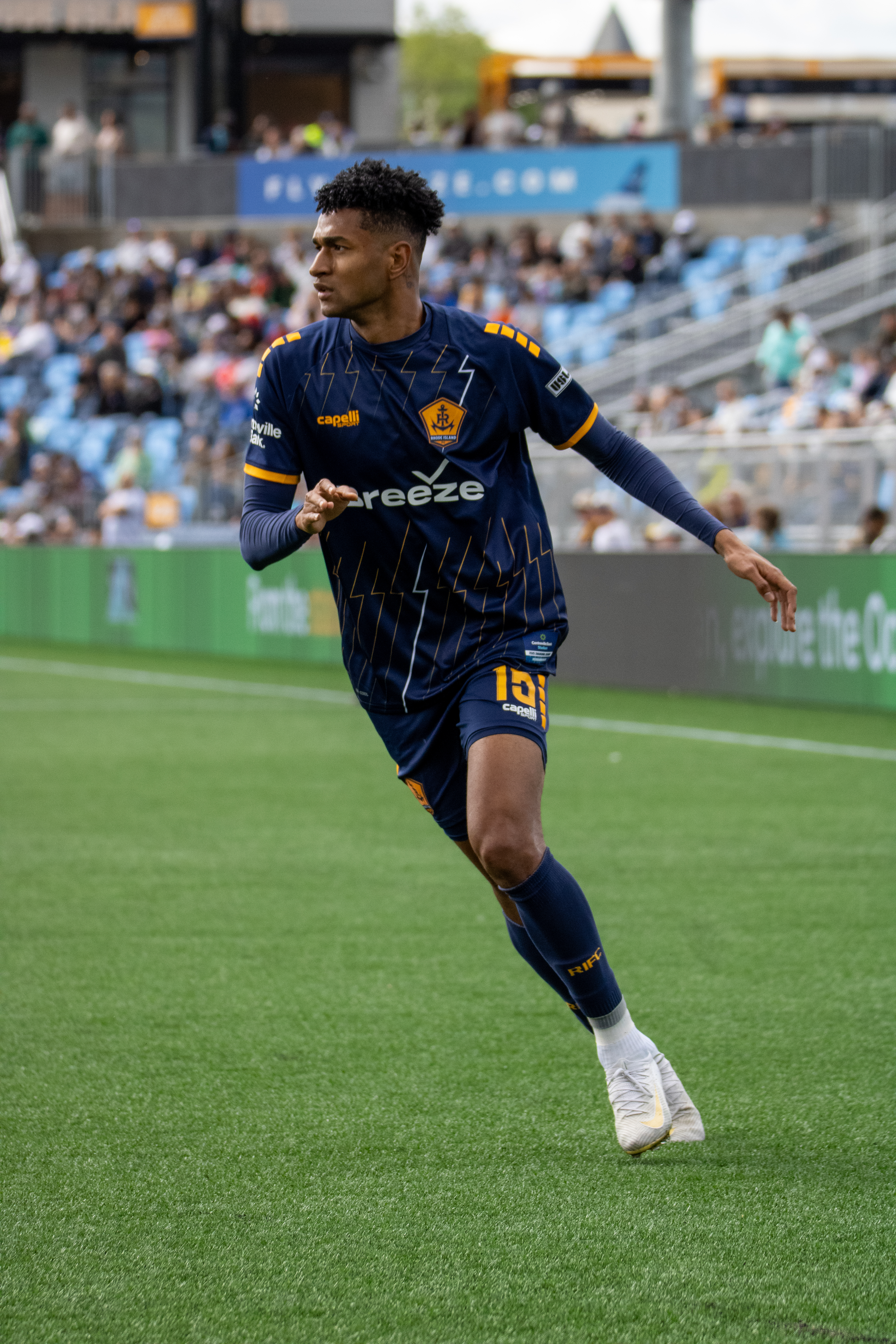
- Nodarse playing with Rhode Island FC during the 2025 USL Championship season

Personal information
- Full name: Frank Leidam Nodarse Chávez
- Date of birth: 6 December 2000 (age 25)
- Place of birth: Havana, Cuba
- Height: 1.94 m (6 ft 4 in)
- Position: Centre-back

Team information
- Current team: Rhode Island FC
- Number: 15

Senior career*
Years	Team	Apps	(Gls)
2019	Storm FC	10	(1)
2020–2021	Fort Lauderdale CF	13	(0)
2021	→ Charleston Battery (loan)	3	(0)
2022–2023	Rio Grande Valley FC	46	(1)
2024–	Rhode Island FC	86	(7)

International career^{‡}
2018	Cuba U20	3	(1)
- * Club domestic league appearances and goals as of 7 November 2026 ‡ National team caps and goals as of 18 July 2020

Frank Leidam Nodarse Chávez (born 6 December 2000) is a Cuban footballer who plays as a defender for USL Championship club Rhode Island FC.

== Career ==
=== Fort Lauderdale CF ===
After joining the club in early 2020, Nodarse made his debut for the club on 18 July 2020, playing the entirety of a 2–0 defeat to Greenville Triumph.

On 13 August 2021, Nodarse joined USL Championship side Charleston Battery on a short-term loan deal for three matches.

=== Rio Grande Valley FC ===
On 12 March 2022, Nodarse made the move to USL Championship club Rio Grande Valley FC.

== Career statistics ==
=== Club ===
As of match played 14 October 2023

Appearances and goals by club, season and competition
Club	Season	League			Cup		Other		Total	
Club	Season	Division	Apps	Goals	Apps	Goals	Apps	Goals	Apps	Goals
Fort Lauderdale CF	2020	USL League One	7	0	—	—	—	—	7	0
Fort Lauderdale CF	2021	USL League One	6	0	—	—	—	—	6	0
Fort Lauderdale CF	Total		13	0	—		—		13	0
Charleston Battery (loan)	2021	USL Championship	3	0	—	—	—	—	3	0
Rio Grande Valley FC Toros	2022	USL Championship	9	1	2	1	—	—	11	2
Rio Grande Valley FC Toros	2023	USL Championship	28	0	0	0	1	0	29	0
Career total			53	1	2	1	1	0	56	2
