= Adrián Diz =

Cuban footballer (born 1994)

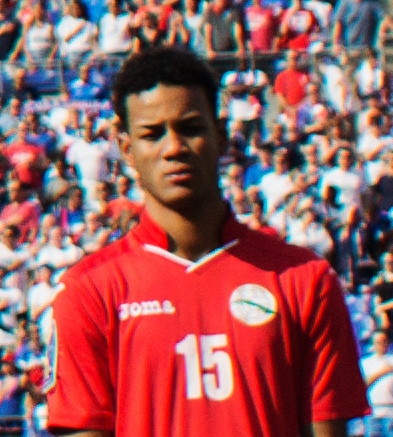
- Diz with Cuba in 2015

Personal information
- Full name: Adrián Arturo Diz Pe
- Date of birth: 4 March 1994 (age 32)
- Place of birth: Havana, Cuba
- Height: 1.91 m (6 ft 3 in)
- Position: Defender

Team information
- Current team: Hartford Athletic
- Number: 30

Senior career*
Years	Team	Apps	(Gls)
2011–2012	Las Tunas		
2013–2015	Ciudad de la Habana		
2016	Santos Laguna	0	(0)
2018–2019	Portland Timbers 2	37	(1)
2020	Colorado Springs Switchbacks	12	(0)
2021	Rio Grande Valley FC	21	(1)
2022	FC Tulsa	30	(1)
2023–2025	Indy Eleven	55	(4)
2025–	Hartford Athletic	48	(3)

International career
2011	Cuba U17	5	(0)
2012–13	Cuba U20	13	(3)
2014	Cuba U21	5	(0)
2011	Cuba U22	3	(0)
2012	Cuba U23	2	(0)
2012–2015	Cuba	13	(0)
- * Club domestic league appearances and goals as of 31 October 2026

Adrián Arturo Diz Pe (born 4 March 1994) is a Cuban professional footballer who plays as a defender for USL Championship club Hartford Athletic.

== Club career ==
A tall central defender, Diz played for local teams Las Tunas and Ciudad de la Habana. After a friendly match in Cuba, Mexican side Santos Laguna agreed to sign four Cuban players for the 2016 Apertura season, with Diz being one of them. He however had reportedly disappeared in February 2016.

On 17 March 2021, Diz joined USL Championship side Rio Grande Valley FC.

Diz signed with USL Championship club FC Tulsa on 26 January 2022.

Diz was transferred to Indy Eleven on March 1, 2023. The terms and the transfer fee were not disclosed. Diz made 31 league appearances in the 2023 USL Championship season, scoring three goals. Diz remained with the club for the 2024 season, making 33 total appearances and scoring one goal, earning two league Team of the Week selections. Diz helped Indy Eleven reach a historic semifinal in the U.S. Open Cup, defeating Major League Soccer (MLS) side Atlanta United FC in the process. Indy Eleven initially announced that Diz would remain with the club for a third consecutive season on 20 November 2024, but on 27 January 2025, his transfer to fellow USL Championship side Hartford Athletic was announced ahead of the 2025 season.

== International career ==
Diz has played in London 2012 Olympic qualifying tournament, 2011 Pan American Games, 2011 CONCACAF U-17 Championship, 2013 CONCACAF U-20 Championship, 2013 FIFA U-20 World Cup, 2012 Caribbean Cup and the 2014 Central American and Caribbean Games.

He made his international debut for Cuba in a June 2012 FIFA World Cup qualification match against Panama and has earned a total of 13 caps, scoring no goals. He represented his country in three FIFA World Cup qualifying matches, and played at five CONCACAF Gold Cup final tournaments.
