= Hugo Bacharach =

Spanish footballer (born 2001)

Personal information
- Full name: Hugo Antonio Bacharach Capdevila
- Date of birth: 27 July 2001 (age 25)
- Place of birth: Valencia, Spain
- Height: 1.93 m (6 ft 4 in)
- Positions: Defender; midfielder

Team information
- Current team: Rhode Island FC
- Number: 4

Youth career
- 2008–2018: Villarreal
- 2018–2020: CD Castellón

College career
Years	Team	Apps	(Gls)
2020–2022	Fairleigh Dickinson Knights	38	(7)
2023	Indiana Hoosiers	20	(4)

Senior career*
Years	Team	Apps	(Gls)
2022–2023	Flint City Bucks	23	(3)
2024	Minnesota United	1	(0)
2024	Minnesota United 2	9	(1)
2025–	Rhode Island FC	41	(5)
- * Club domestic league appearances and goals as of 15:14, 8 November 2026 (UTC)

Hugo Antonio Bacharach Capdevila (born 27 July 2001) is a Spanish professional footballer who plays for Rhode Island FC in the USL Championship.

== Early life ==
Bacharach was born in Valencia, but grew up in Benicàssim. Bacharach began playing football at a young age with his school team. At age 7, he joined the Villarreal youth system, where he played for ten years. At age 17, he joined the CD Castellón youth system where he spent two years, until he was 19.

== College career ==
In 2020, he decided to continue his footballing career and education, as well as learn English, by moving to the United States to attend college on a scholarship. He began attending Fairleigh Dickinson University. On 1 March 2021, he scored his first collegiate goal in a 1–0 victory over the Sacred Heart Pioneers. He was then named the Northeast Conference Rookie of the Week. At the end of his first season, he was named to the All-NEC First Team, the NEC All-Freshman Team, and the NEC Fall Honor Roll. At the end of his sophomore season, he was named to the All-NEC First Team and NEC Fall Academic Honor Roll for the second-straight season, and was named to the All-Northeast Region Second Team. In his junior season, he was named the NEC Defensive Player of the Year, and named to the All-NEC First Team, the All-Northeast Region First Team, and the All-ECAC First Team.

In 2023, he transferred to Indiana University Bloomington. Prior to the season, he was named to the MAC Hermann Trophy Watch List and was named to the TopDrawerSoccer Preseason Best XI Second Team. On 24 August, he made his debut for Indiana in a match against the Notre Dame Fighting Irish. Midway through the season, he was moved from his central defender position into central midfield, where he played for the remainder of the season. In his first match as a midfielder, on 7 October, he recorded a pair of assists in a victory over the Penn State Nittany Lions. On 29 October, he scored his first goal for Indiana against the Rutgers Scarlet Knights. On 31 October, he was named the Big Ten Conference Defensive Player of the Week. On 19 November he scored a brace in a 3–2 victory over the Wake Forest Demon Deacons. After the season, he was named to the All-Big Ten Second Team, the Big Ten All-Tournament Team, the TopDrawerSoccer third-team Best XI, and was named #30 on the TopDrawerSoccer Postseason Top 100. After the 2023 season, he was invited to participate in the MLS College Showcase.

== Club career ==
In 2022, he began playing with the Flint City Bucks in USL League Two, scoring once. He was named the team's Player of the Year in 2022 and was named to the USL League Two Central Conference Team of the Year. In 2023, he scored two goals, including a Goal of the Week winner in Week 8. At the end of the season, he was named Great Lakes Division Player of the Year, and was also named the USL League Two Defender of the Year, and named to the Team of the Year. Over his two seasons, he helped them win back-to-back USL League Two Central Conference titles and reached the national semifinals in both seasons.

At the 2024 MLS SuperDraft, Bacharach was selected in the first round (ninth overall) by Minnesota United FC. In March 2024, he signed a one-year contract with the club with options from 2025 through 2027. He made his professional debut with the second team Minnesota United FC 2 in a US Open Cup match against the Michigan Stars, before making his Major League Soccer debut with the first team on 13 April against Houston Dynamo FC.

Bacharach signed with USL Championship side Rhode Island FC on December 31, 2024.

== Career statistics ==
As of 4 August 2024

Club	Season	League			Playoffs		Domestic Cup		Other		Total	
Club	Season	Division	Apps	Goals	Apps	Goals	Apps	Goals	Apps	Goals	Apps	Goals
Minnesota United FC	2024	Major League Soccer	1	0	0	0	–		0	0	1	0
Minnesota United FC 2 (loan)	2024	MLS Next Pro	1	0	0	0	1	0	–		2	0
Career total			2	0	0	0	1	0	0	0	3	0
