= 2024 Miami FC season =

Miami FC
2024 season
- Owner: Riccardo Silva
- Head coach: Antonio Nocerino (until Oct. 16); Marcello Alves (from Oct. 16)
- Stadium: FIU Stadium; Miami, Florida; FIU Soccer Stadium; Miami, Florida (5 matches)
- USL Championship: Eastern Conf.: 12th Overall: 24th
- Playoffs: Did not qualify
- U.S. Open Cup: Third Round
- Top goalscorer: League: Frank López (7); All: Frank López (7)
- Highest home attendance: 1,823 (Oct. 5 vs. PGH)
- Lowest home attendance: League: 563 (Aug. 14 vs. MEM); All: 471 (Apr. 17 vs. TRM)
- Average home league attendance: League: 1,075; All: 1,041
- Biggest win: MIA 2–0 COS (Mar. 9)
- Biggest defeat: RI 8–1 MIA (Oct. 26)

The 2024 Miami FC season was the club's fifth season in the USL Championship, the second-tier of American soccer, and tenth overall.

== Roster ==
As of October 26, 2024

Appearances and goals are career totals from all-competitions and leagues.

No.	Name	Nationality	Position	Date of birth (age)	Signed from	Signed in	Contract ends	Apps.	Goals
Goalkeepers
1	Khadim Ndiaye	(Senegal)	GK	April 12, 2000 (age 25)	(Bulgaria) FC Hebar Pazardzhik	2023		12	0
12	Daniel Gagliardi	(United States)	GK	January 21, 1997 (age 29)	Unattached	2024		15	0
31	Felipe Rodriguez	(Uruguay)	GK	May 14, 2004 (age 21)	Miami FC Academy	2024	2024	11	0
Defenders
2	Allan Aniz	(Brazil)	DF	May 11, 2003 (age 22)	(Brazil) SC Internacional U-20	2024		2	0
3	Jordan Ayimbila	(Ghana)	DF	February 14, 2001 (age 25)	Las Vegas Lights FC	2023		21	0
4	Nicolás Cardona	(Puerto Rico)	DF	February 11, 1999 (age 27)	Chattanooga Red Wolves SC	2023		30	0
14	Daniel Barbir	(United States)	DF	January 31, 1998 (age 28)	Indy Eleven	2024	2024	20	0
15	Mujeeb Murana	(Nigeria)	DF	September 23, 2000 (age 25)	Birmingham Legion FC	2024	2024	17	0
18	Junior Palacios	(Colombia)	DF	July 26, 1996 (age 29)	Unattached	2024	2024	63	1
29	Alejandro Mitrano	(Venezuela)	DF	April 4, 1998 (age 27)	Las Vegas Lights FC	2024	2025	34	0
34	Marco Santana	(Spain)	DF	January 8, 2005 (age 21)	Miami FC Academy	2024	2024	7	0
Midfielders
5	Joey DeZart	(Jamaica)	MF	June 9, 1998 (age 27)	Tampa Bay Rowdies	2024		12	1
8	Gabriel Cabral	(Brazil)	MF	April 29, 1997 (age 28)	Tormenta FC	2022	2024+	48	3
13	Daltyn Knutson	(United States)	MF	March 1, 1997 (age 29)	Tormenta FC	2024		32	0
16	Manuel Botta	(Italy)	MF	July 16, 2002 (age 23)	(Italy) SS Audace Cerignola	2024		25	1
33	Lucas De Paula	(United States)	MF	March 23, 2006 (age 19)	Miami FC Academy	2024	2024	11	0
99	Allen Gavilanes	(United States)	MF	August 24, 1999 (age 26)	Greenville Triumph SC	2023		34	5
Forwards
7	Luis Pedro	(Brazil)	FW	December 19, 2002 (age 23)	(Brazil) Itabirito Futebol Clube	2024		22	5
9	Isaac Zuleta	(United States)	FW	August 10, 2003 (age 22)	New Mexico United	2023		0	0
11	Frank López	(Cuba)	FW	February 25, 1995 (age 31)	Rio Grande Valley FC	2023		24	7
17	Khalid Balogun	(United States)	FW	July 25, 1998 (age 27)	loan from Lexington SC	2024	2024	3	1
19	Michael Lawrence	(United States)	FW	July 10, 1999 (age 26)	Miami FC	2024	2024	18	3
23	Rocco Genzano	(Italy)	FW	May 15, 2004 (age 21)	(Italy) Lykos Football Club	2023		32	2
30	Christopher Jean-Francois	(Haiti)	FW	November 1, 2005 (age 20)	Miami FC Academy	2024	2024	5	0
35	Sébatien Joseph	(Haiti)	FW	January 2, 2007 (age 19)	Miami FC Academy	2024	2024	9	0
50	Roberto Molina	(El Salvador)	FW	January 28, 2001 (age 25)	Indy Eleven	2024	2024	27	1

=== Staff ===
- (Brazil) Marcello Alves – Interim head coach
- (Cuba) Ariel Martínez – Assistant coach
- (Italy) Giuseppe Weller – Goalkeeper coach

==== Departed staff ====
- (Italy) Antonio Nocerino – Head coach
- (Italy) Giovanni Troise – Assistant coach
- (Italy) Massimo Borlina – Head of sports performance

== Transfers ==
=== In ===
#	Pos.	Player	Signed from	Details	Date	Source
11	FW	(Cuba) Frank López	(United States) Rio Grande Valley FC	Free transfer	December 4, 2023	
6	MF	(Germany) Samuel Biek	(Germany) FC Rot-Weiß Erfurt	Free transfer	December 6, 2023	
3	DF	(Ghana) Jordan Ayimbila	(United States) Las Vegas Lights FC	Free transfer	December 8, 2023	
9	FW	(United States) Isaac Zuleta	(United States) New Mexico United	Free transfer	December 11, 2023	
13	MF	(United States) Daltyn Knutson	(United States) Tormenta FC	Free transfer	December 13, 2023	
21	MF	(Laos) Michael Vang	(United States) Portland Timbers 2	Free transfer	December 15, 2023	
4	DF	(Puerto Rico) Nicolás Cardona	(United States) Chattanooga Red Wolves SC	Free transfer	December 18, 2023	
23	FW	(Italy) Rocco Genzano	(Italy) Lykos Football Club	Free transfer	December 22, 2023	
67	FW	(Italy) Mattia Gagliardi	(Italy) ASD GC Sora	Free transfer	December 27, 2023	
99	MF	(United States) Allen Gavilanes	(United States) Greenville Triumph SC	Free transfer	December 29, 2023	
1	GK	(Senegal) Khadim Ndiaye	(Bulgaria) FC Hebar Pazardzhik	Free transfer	January 1, 2024	
32	MF	(Peru) David Mejía	(United States) Atlanta United 2	Free transfer	January 7, 2024	
16	MF	(Italy) Manuel Botta	(Italy) SS Audace Cerignola	Free transfer	January 19, 2024	
12	GK	(United States) Daniel Gagliardi	Unattached	Free transfer	January 24, 2024	
2	DF	(Brazil) Allan Aniz	(Brazil) SC Internacional U-20	Free transfer	January 26, 2024	
5	DF	(France) Achille Truchot	(Czech Republic) 1. SC Znojmo FK	Free transfer	February 1, 2024	
80	MF	(Jamaica) Andrew Booth	(United States) Charleston Battery	Free transfer	February 10, 2024	
29	DF	(Venezuela) Alejandro Mitrano	(United States) Las Vegas Lights FC	Free transfer	February 26, 2024	
7	FW	(Brazil) Luis Pedro	(Brazil) Itabirito Futebol Clube	Free transfer	March 7, 2024	
30	MF	(Haiti) Christopher Jean-Francois	(United States) Miami FC Academy	Academy contract	March 8, 2024	
31	GK	(Uruguay) Felipe Rodriguez	(United States) Miami FC Academy	Academy contract	March 8, 2024	
33	MF	(United States) Lucas De Paula	(United States) Miami FC Academy	Academy contract	March 8, 2024	
14	DF	(United States) Daniel Barbir	(United States) Indy Eleven	Trade	April 11, 2024	
50	FW	(El Salvador) Roberto Molina	(United States) Indy Eleven	Trade	April 11, 2024	
19	FW	(United States) Michael Lawrence	(United States) Miami FC	Free transfer (Note: Was signed on a one-month deal in late April, signed an extended contract with Miami FC for the rest of the 2024 USL Championship season. Also played with Miami during the 2023 season.)	April 27, 2024	
15	DF	(Nigeria) Mujeeb Murana	(United States) Birmingham Legion FC	Transfer	June 1, 2024	
34	DF	(Spain) Marco Santana	(United States) Miami FC Academy	Academy contract	June 6, 2024	
18	DF	(Colombia) Junior Palacios	Unattached	Free transfer	June 19, 2024	
35	FW	(Haiti) Sébatien Joseph	(United States) Miami FC Academy	Academy contract	August 10, 2024	
5	MF	(Jamaica) Joey DeZart	(United States) Tampa Bay Rowdies	Transfer	August 10, 2024	

=== Out ===
#	Pos.	Player	Signed to	Details	Date	Source
1	GK	(United States) Jake McGuire	(United States) North Carolina FC	Not re-signed	November 7, 2023	
3	DF	(United States) Aedan Stanley	(United States) Indy Eleven	Not re-signed	November 7, 2023	
6	DF	(Guatemala) Moisés Hernández	(United States) Dallas Sidekicks (indoor)	Mutual contract termination	November 7, 2023	
7	FW	(Italy) Claudio Repetto	Retired	Not re-signed	November 7, 2023	
9	FW	(United States) Kyle Murphy	(United States) Memphis 901 FC	Not re-signed	November 7, 2023	
10	MF	(France) Florian Valot	(United States) Loudoun United FC	Not re-signed	November 7, 2023	
11	FW	(El Salvador) Joaquín Rivas	(United States) El Paso Locomotive FC	Not re-signed	November 7, 2023	
13	GK	(United States) Adrian Zendejas	(United States) Charlotte FC	End of loan	November 7, 2023	
14	MF	(Trinidad and Tobago) Ryan Telfer	(Canada) HFX Wanderers FC	Contract options not exercised	November 7, 2023	
18	MF	(Ghana) Dennis Dowouna	Unattached	Contract options not exercised	November 7, 2023	
21	DF	(Nigeria) Bolu Akinyode	(United States) El Paso Locomotive FC	Not re-signed	November 7, 2023	
23	DF	(England) Curtis Thorn	(United States) Tormenta FC	Buy-out option executed	November 7, 2023	
77	DF	(Brazil) Gustavo Rissi	(United States) Indy Eleven	End of loan	November 7, 2023	
99	FW	(El Salvador) Christian Sorto	(United States) Orange County SC	Not re-signed	November 7, 2023	
5	DF	(England) Callum Chapman-Page	(United States) Indy Eleven	Free transfer	November 17, 2023	
17	FW	(Belize) Michael Salazar	(United States) Los Angeles Force	Buy-out option executed	December 5, 2023	
4	DF	(England) Paco Craig	(United States) North Carolina FC	Transfer, undisclosed fee	December 8, 2023	
17	MF	(United States) Ben Mines	(United States) Indy Eleven	Trade	April 11, 2024	
22	DF	(United States) Benjamin Ofeimu	(United States) Indy Eleven	Trade	April 11, 2024	
21	MF	(Laos) Michael Vang	Retired	Released	June 21, 2024	
80	MF	(Jamaica) Andrew Booth	(United States) FC Tulsa	Transfer	July 10, 2024	
32	MF	(Peru) David Mejía	Unattached	Released	July 20, 2024	
5	DF	(France) Achille Truchot	(France) Thonon Evian Grand Genève FC	Released	August 1, 2024	
6	MF	(Germany) Samuel Biek	(United States) Charleston Battery	Transfer, undisclosed fee	August 9, 2024	
67	FW	(Italy) Mattia Gagliardi	(Italy) Ascoli Calcio 1898 FC	Released	August 21, 2024	

=== Loan in ===
#	Pos.	Player	Loaned from	Details	Date	Source
17	FW	(United States) Khalid Balogun	(United States) Lexington SC	Season-long	June 29, 2024	

== Friendlies ==
January 27 Preseason	Miami FC	v	Miami Soccer Academy	Miami, Florida
		Report 1 Report 2		Stadium: FIU Soccer Stadium
Note: Results not published

February 3 Preseason	Miami FC	v	Florida Atlantic Owls	Miami, Florida
		Report 1 Report 2		Stadium: FIU Soccer Stadium
Note: Results not published

February 10 Preseason	Miami FC	0–5	Sporting Kansas City	Miami, Florida
11 AM EST		Report	46' (o.g.); Afrifa 65'; Agada 93' (pen.), 96', 118' (pen.)	Stadium: FIU Soccer Stadium
Note: 120-minute scrimmage

February 17 Preseason	Miami FC	v	FIU Panthers	Miami, Florida
		Report		Stadium: FIU Soccer Stadium
Note: Results not published

February 24 Preseason	Miami FC	v	Palm Beach Atlantic Sailfish	Miami, Florida
9 AM EST		Report		Stadium: FIU Soccer Stadium
Note: Results not published

== Competitive ==
=== USL Championship ===
==== Standings — Eastern Conference ====
Pos	Team	Pld	W	L	T	GF	GA	GD	Pts	Qualification
1	Louisville City FC (S)	34	24	6	4	86	43	+43	76	Playoffs
2	Charleston Battery	34	18	6	10	68	35	+33	64	Playoffs
3	Detroit City FC	34	15	8	11	46	32	+14	56	Playoffs
4	Indy Eleven	34	14	11	9	49	50	−1	51	Playoffs
5	Rhode Island FC	34	12	7	15	56	41	+15	51	Playoffs
6	Tampa Bay Rowdies	34	14	12	8	55	46	+9	50	Playoffs
7	Pittsburgh Riverhounds SC	34	12	10	12	41	28	+13	48	Playoffs
8	North Carolina FC	34	13	12	9	54	43	+11	48	Playoffs
9	Birmingham Legion FC	34	13	15	6	44	51	−7	45	
10	Hartford Athletic	34	12	14	8	39	52	−13	44	
11	Loudoun United FC	34	11	14	9	44	39	+5	42	
12	Miami FC	34	3	29	2	26	89	−63	11	

Source: USL Championship Standings
(S) Players' Shield winner

==== Results summary ====
Overall								Home						Away					
Pld	W	D	L	GF	GA	GD	Pts	W	D	L	GF	GA	GD	W	D	L	GF	GA	GD
34	3	2	29	26	89	−63	11	3	1	13	16	42	−26	0	1	16	10	47	−37

Last updated: November 1, 2024.
Source: Match reports

==== Match results ====
March 9 1	Miami FC	2–0	Colorado Springs Switchbacks FC	Miami, Florida
7:00 pm EST	Booth 16'; Genzano (yellow card) 77'; Botta 85' (pen.), (yellow card) 90+7'	Report	Lacroix (yellow card) 12'; Henríquez (yellow card) 66'	Stadium: FIU Stadium; Attendance: 1,122; Referee: Sergii Demianchuk

March 16 2	Miami FC	0–1	Sacramento Republic FC	Miami, Florida
7:00 pm EDT	Mines (yellow card) 82'; Booth (yellow card) 88'	Report	Desmond (yellow card) 44'; Gurr (yellow card) 53'; Amann 59'; Parano (yellow card) 66'	Stadium: FIU Stadium; Attendance: 1,044; Referee: Elton García

March 23 3	Orange County SC	2–2	Miami FC	Irvine, California
7:00 pm PDT	Partida (yellow card) 29'; Miles 33'; Amang 70'	Report	Mitrano (yellow card) 8'; Gavilanes 12', 45+4'; Genzano (yellow card) 58'; Botta (yellow card) 60'	Stadium: Championship Soccer Stadium; Attendance: 5,000; Referee: Jeremy Scheer

March 30 4	Miami FC	1–2	Charleston Battery	Miami, Florida
7:00 pm EDT	Gavilanes 9', (yellow card) 63'; Cardona (yellow card) 53'; Gagliardi (yellow card) 61'	Report	Markanich 11'; Allan (yellow card) 58'; Myers 82'; Crawford (yellow card) 88'	Stadium: FIU Stadium; Attendance: 1,107; Referee: Adam Kilpatrick

April 6 5	Hartford Athletic	3–2	Miami FC	Hartford, Connecticut
2:00 pm EDT	Williams (penalty missed) 30', (yellow card) 41', (goal) 55'; Farrell (yellow card) 33'; Beckford 45'; Ngalina (yellow card) 45+2'; Walters (yellow card) 72'; Mushagalusa 90+1'	Report	Genzano (yellow card) 22'; Mitrano (yellow card) 40'; Cardona (yellow card) 62'; Cabral 76'; Luis Pedro (yellow card) 86'; Farrell 90+3' (o.g.)	Stadium: Trinity Health Stadium; Attendance: 3,394; Referee: Abdou Ndiaye

April 11 6	Miami FC	2–5	Tampa Bay Rowdies	Miami, Florida
7:00 PM EDT	Vang (yellow card) 17'; Gabriel Cabral (yellow card) 32'; Rocco Genzano 48'; Gavilanes 55'; Botta (yellow card) 56' (yellow-red card) 73'; Khadim Ndiaye (yellow card) 86'	Report	Arteaga (yellow card) 14' (goal) 62'; Jennings 39' 52'; Bodily 45+4'; Hilton (yellow card) 49'; Munjoma (yellow card) 64'	Stadium: FIU Soccer Stadium; Attendance: 887; Referee: (United States) Calin Radosav

April 20 7	Miami FC	0–1	Birmingham Legion FC	Miami, Florida
7:00 PM EDT	Molina (yellow card) 51'; Luis Pedro (yellow card) 82'; Cardona (yellow card) 88'	Report	Mensah (yellow card) 60'; Stefano Pinho 62'; Hernandez-Foster (yellow card) 70'; Martínez (yellow card) 89'	Stadium: FIU Stadium; Attendance: 1,092; Referee: (United States) Lorenzo Hernandez

April 27 8	Miami FC	2–1	San Antonio FC	Miami, Florida
7:00 PM EDT	Luis Pedro 24'; Michael Lawrence (yellow card) 37' (goal) 45'; Gagliardi (yellow card) 74'; Ayimbila (yellow card) 89'; Gabriel Cabral (yellow card) 90+4'	Report	Gomez (yellow card) 6'; Taintor (yellow card) 7'; Haakenson 11'; Lambert (yellow card) 90+3'	Stadium: FIU Stadium; Attendance: 1,078; Referee: (United States) Nabil Bensalah

May 4 9	Pittsburgh Riverhounds SC	1–0	Miami FC	Pittsburgh, Pennsylvania
7:00 PM EDT	Sterling 16'	Report	Cardona (yellow card) 32'; Rocco Genzano (yellow card) 40'	Stadium: Highmark Stadium; Attendance: 4,172; Referee: (United States) Brandon Stevis

May 8 10	Miami FC	P–P	Memphis 901 FC	Miami, Florida
7:00 PM EDT		Report		Stadium: FIU Soccer Stadium
Note: Postponed to August 14 to accommodate U.S. Open Cup scheduling conflict

May 12 11	Miami FC	1–3	Indy Eleven	Miami, Florida
7:00 PM EDT	Cardona (yellow card) 19'; López (yellow card) 31'; Mitrano (yellow card) 45+1'; Luis Pedro 57'	Report	Gibson (yellow card) 3'; Diz 41'; Lindley (yellow card) 61'; Williams 67' (pen.) 70' (yellow card) 90+2'	Stadium: FIU Soccer Stadium; Attendance: 1,004; Referee: (United States) Muhammad Hassan

May 18 12	Phoenix Rising FC	2–0	Miami FC	Chandler, Arizona
7:30 PM MST	Varela 36'; Rito 43' (yellow card) 44'; Armenakas (yellow card) 78'	Report	Mitrano (yellow card) 81'; Lucas Depaula (yellow card) 88'	Stadium: Phoenix Rising Soccer Complex at Wild Horse Pass; Referee: (United States) Matthew Corrigan

May 25 13	Miami FC	0–4	North Carolina FC	Miami, Florida
7:00 PM EDT	Molina (yellow card) 5'; Knutson (yellow card) 12'; Christopher Jean-Francois (yellow card) 90+2'; Mitrano (yellow card) 90+4'	Report	Conway 51'; Anderson 69'; Maldonado 76'; Rodrigo da Costa 89'	Stadium: FIU Soccer Stadium; Attendance: 1,039; Referee: (United States) Trevor Wiseman

June 1 14	Miami FC	1–2	Louisville City FC	Miami, Florida
7:00 PM EDT	Knutson (yellow card) 27'; Booth (yellow card) 30'; Cardona (yellow card) 42'; López 61' (yellow card) 75'; Michael Lawrence (yellow card) 71'; Mitrano (yellow card) 81'	Report	Wynder 31'; Perez (yellow card) 38'; Charpie (yellow card) 59'; Totsch 84' (pen.); Las (yellow card) 90+2'	Stadium: FIU Stadium; Attendance: 1,098; Referee: (United States) Alejo Calume

June 8 15	Las Vegas Lights FC	3–1	Miami FC	Las Vegas, Nevada
7:30 PM PST	Nigro (yellow card) 40'; Bennett 45+3' 63' (pen.); Noël 82'	Report	López 25'; Mujeeb Murana (yellow card) 65'; Michael Lawrence (yellow card) 87'	Stadium: Cashman Field; Attendance: 1,748; Referee: (United States) Lorenzo Hernandez

June 19 16	FC Tulsa	2-1	Miami FC	Tulsa, Oklahoma
7:30 PM CDT	Goodrum 61'; Pacheco 71'	Report	Gavilanes 11'	Stadium: ONEOK Field; Attendance: 3,009; Referee: Christopher Calderon

June 22 17	Miami FC	2–2	Loudoun United FC	Miami, Florida
7:00 PM EST	Lopez 11' (yellow card) 90'+2'; Booth (yellow card) 14'; Lawrence 26'; Genzano (yellow card) 32'; Barbir (yellow card) 49'; Gavilanes (yellow card) 90'	Report	Aboukoura 51'; Bidois 53'; Wane (yellow card) 90'+1'; Bustamante (yellow card) 90'+5'	Stadium: FIU Stadium; Attendance: 846; Referee: Eric Tattersall

June 29 18	Miami FC	0–4	Detroit City FC	Miami, Florida
7:00 PM EST	Botta (yellow card) 6'; Palacios (yellow card) 50' (yellow-red card) 88'; Booth (yellow card) 53'; Frank Lopez (yellow card) 87'	Report	Williams 44'; Bryant 51'; Carroll (yellow card) 65'; Rodriguez 72' 90'+3'	Stadium: FIU Stadium; Attendance: 1,077; Referee: Alyssa Nichols

July 6 19	North Carolina FC	4–1	Miami FC	Cary, North Carolina
7:30 EST	Craig (yellow card) 11'; Mentzingen 50'; Conway 63' 64'; Anderson 77' (pen.) da Costa (yellow card) 90'+3'	Report	Knutson (yellow card) 7'; Balogun 18'; Cardona (yellow card) 45'+2'; Mitrano (yellow card) 57'; Biek (yellow card) 66'	Stadium: WakeMed Soccer Park; Attendance: 2,161; Referee: Sergii Demianchuk

July 13 20	Miami FC	2–3	Rhode Island FC	Miami, Florida
7:00 PM EST	Palacios (yellow card) 9'; Biek (yellow card) 46'; Lopez 62'; Molina 78'	Report	Nodarse (yellow card) 5' (goal) 11'; Williams (yellow card) 44'; Lega 45'+5' 48'; Holstad (yellow card) 50'; Vegas (yellow card) 80'; Fuson (yellow card) 81'	Stadium: FIU Stadium; Attendance: 1,238; Referee: Alex Billeter

July 19 21	Charleston Battery	2–0	Miami FC	Mount Pleasant, South Carolina
7:30 EST	Markanich 47' 51' (pen.); Crawford (yellow card) 83'	Report	Lopez (yellow card) 45'+2'; Murana (yellow card) 50'; Santana (yellow card) 87'	Stadium: Patriots Point Soccer Complex; Attendance: 2,883; Referee: Elvis Osmanovic

July 27 22	Miami FC	1–2	Oakland Roots	Miami, Florida
7:00 PM	Palacios (yellow card) 52'; López 75'	Report	Margvelashvili (yellow card) 19'; Diaz 38'; Dwyer (yellow card) 56'; Rodriguez 68'; Reid (yellow card) 82'; Matsoso (yellow card) 88'	Stadium: FIU Stadium; Attendance: 1,041; Referee: Thomas Snyder

August 3 23	Loudoun United FC	4–1	Miami FC	Leesburg, Virginia
7:30 PM	Aboukoura 45'+8' (pen.); ElMedkhar 66', 76'; Williamson 90'+2'	Report	Genzaon 2'; Palacios (yellow card) 44'; López (yellow card) 45'+1' (yellow-red card) 45'+9'; Cardona (yellow card) 45'+4' (yellow-red card) 51'; Francois (yellow card) 82'	Stadium: Segra Field; Referee: Brad Jensen

August 10 24	El Paso Locomotive FC	2–1	Miami FC	El Paso, Texas
	Akinyode (yellow card) 13'; Coronado 45'+1'; Moreno (yellow card) 51' (goal) 66'	Report	Cabral (yellow card) 39'; Depaula (yellow card) 40'; Santana (yellow card) 44'; Da Silva 90'+3'	Stadium: Southwest University Park; Attendance: 7,067; Referee: Ekaterina Koroleva

August 14 25	Miami FC	1–5	Memphis 901 FC	Miami, Florida
	López 5'; Pedro (yellow card) 74'	Report	Borczak 15'; Armenakas (yellow card) 60'; Cardona 81' (o.g.); Pickering 85'; Careaga 90'+2'; Quezada 90'+4'	Stadium: FIU Stadium; Attendance: 563; Referee: Jeremy Scheer
Note: Rescheduled match that was to be played on May 8

August 24 26	Tampa Bay Rowdies	2–0	Miami FC	St. Petersburg, Florida
	Arteaga (yellow card) 45'+2' (goal) 61'; Niyongabire (yellow card) 45'+4'; Kleemann (yellow card) 48'; Jennings (yellow card) 70'; Rivera 72'	Report	Roberto Molina (yellow card) 37'; Dezart (yellow card) 67'; Cardona (yellow card) 85'	Stadium: Al Lang Stadium; Attendance: 6,310; Referee: John Matto

August 31 27	Miami FC	1–0	Monterey Bay FC	Miami, Florida
	Lawrence (yellow card) 45'+2'; López 48'; Knutson (yellow card) 88'	Report	Rebollar (yellow card) 4'; Ayon (yellow card) 22' (yellow-red card) 39'; Ngnepi (yellow card) 90'+7'	Stadium: FIU Stadium; Attendance: 1,013; Referee: Esad Omanovic

September 6 28	New Mexico United	1–0	Miami FC	Albuquerque, New Mexico
9:00 PM	Hurst (yellow card) 30'; Houssou (yellow card) 37'; Reyes 45'; Micaletto (yellow card) 47'	Report		Stadium: Isotopes Park; Attendance: 9,069; Referee: Gerald Flores

September 14 29	Miami FC	0–3	Hartford Athletic	Miami, Florida
	Mitrano (yellow card) 77'; López (yellow card) 87'	Report	Mamadou 50', 81'; Toure (yellow card) 64'; Farrell 73'	Stadium: FIU Stadium; Attendance: 1,196; Referee: Nabil Bensalah

September 22 30	Birmingham Legion FC	1–0	Miami FC	Birmingham, Alabama
	Zouhir (yellow card) 39'; Martínez (yellow card) 90'; Matheus 90'+4'	Report		Stadium: Protective Stadium; Attendance: 4,279; Referee: Benjamin Meyer

September 28 31	Indy Eleven	4–0	Miami FC	Indianapolis, Indiana
7:00 PM	Quinn (yellow card) 42'; Blake 62' (pen.); A. Williams 73', 84', 86', (yellow card) 87'; Diz Pe (red card) 77'; Soumaoro (yellow card) 87'	Report	Gavilanes (yellow card) 25'; Knutson (yellow card) 60'; Ndiaye (red card) 77'; Palacios (yellow card) 90+1'	Stadium: Michael A. Carroll Stadium; Attendance: 10,145; Referee: Matthew Thompson

October 2 32	Louisville City FC	3–0	Miami FC	Louisville, Kentucky
8:30 PM	Totsh 11'; Serrano (yellow card) 19', (goal) 83'; Wynder (yellow card) 26'; Goodrum 73'	Report	Joseph (yellow card) 57'	Stadium: Lynn Family Stadium; Attendance: 8,020; Referee: Matt Trotter

October 5 33	Miami FC	0–4	Pittsburgh Riverhounds SC	Miami, Florida
7:00 PM	Santana (yellow card) 19'; Mitrano (yellow card) 44'; Palacios (yellow card) 64' (yellow-red card) 89'	Report	Biasi (yellow card) 32'; Jacquesson 42'; Jacquesson 51', 75'; Kizza 58'; Mertz (yellow card) 76'	Stadium: FIU Stadium; Attendance: 1,823; Referee: Luis Arroyo

October 19 33	Detroit City FC	3–0	Miami FC	Hamtramck, Michigan
4:00 PM EDT	Rh. Williams 39'; Kissiedou 75'; Steinwascher 90+5' (pen.)	Report	Rodriguez (yellow card) 90+4'	Stadium: Keyworth Stadium; Attendance: 6,564; Referee: Servando Berna Rico

October 26 34	Rhode Island FC	8–1	Miami FC	Smithfield, RI
8:00PM	Fuson 10'; Williams 16', 40' (pen.), 45+4' (yellow card) 47'; Ybarra 31'; Nodarse 54'; Dikwa 75'; Kwizera 82'; Shapiro-Thompson (yellow card) 88'	Report	Lawrence 45+1' (yellow card) 79'; Palacios (yellow card) 64'; Genzano (yellow card) 86'; Ayimbila (yellow card) 88'	Stadium: Beirne Stadium; Attendance: 5,252; Referee: Elijio Arreguin

=== U.S. Open Cup ===
As a member of the USL Championship, Miami FC entered the U.S. Open Cup in the third round, matched up against South Georgia Tormenta FC, a member of the USL League One, the third tier of the American soccer pyramid.

April 17	Miami FC (ULSC) (Florida)	2–4	(Georgia (U.S. state)) South Georgia Tormenta FC (USL1)	Miami, Florida
	Knutson (yellow card) 11'; Luisinho 20', 45+8'; Botta (yellow card) 39'; Ndiaye (red card) 45'+4'; Rodriguez (yellow card) 45'+7'	Report	Dengler 12'; D'Almeida (yellow card) 44'; Rodriguez (yellow card) 45'+4'; Stretch (yellow card) 45'+10' (goal) 88'; Doyle 69'; Spengler (yellow card) 70'; Vivas 90'	Stadium: FIU Soccer Stadium; Attendance: 471; Referee: Daniel Gutierrez

== Squad statistics ==
As of Match played October 26, 2024

=== Appearances and goals ===
No.	Pos	Nat	Player	Total		Regular Season		Open Cup	
No.	Pos	Nat	Player	Apps	Goals	Apps	Goals	Apps	Goals
Goalkeepers
1	GK	(Senegal) SEN	Khadim Ndiaye	12	0	10+1	0	1+0	0
12	GK	(United States) USA	Daniel Gagliardi	15	0	14+1	0	0+0	0
31	GK	(Uruguay) URU	Felipe Rodriguez	11	0	10+0	0	0+1	0
Defenders
2	DF	(Brazil) BRA	Allan Aniz	2	0	2+0	0	0+0	0
3	DF	(Ghana) GHA	Jordan Ayimbila	21	0	8+12	0	1+0	0
4	DF	(Puerto Rico) PUR	Nicolás Cardona	30	0	28+1	0	1+0	0
14	DF	(United States) USA	Daniel Barbir	20	0	17+2	0	0+1	0
15	DF	(Nigeria) NGA	Mujeeb Murana	17	0	13+4	0	0+0	0
18	DF	(Colombia) COL	Junior Palacios	18	0	17+1	0	0+0	0
29	DF	(Venezuela) VEN	Alejandro Mitrano	34	0	28+5	0	1+0	0
34	DF	(Spain) ESP	Marco Santana	7	0	2+5	0	0+0	0
Midfielders
5	MF	(Jamaica) JAM	Joey DeZart	12	1	11+1	1	0+0	0
8	MF	(Brazil) BRA	Gabriel Cabral	26	1	16+10	1	0+0	0
13	MF	(United States) USA	Daltyn Knutson	32	0	31+0	0	1+0	0
16	MF	(Italy) ITA	Manuel Botta	25	1	13+11	1	1+0	0
33	MF	(United States) USA	Lucas De Paula	11	0	2+9	0	0+0	0
99	MF	(United States) USA	Allen Gavilanes	34	5	28+5	5	0+1	0
Forwards
7	FW	(Brazil) BRA	Luis Pedro	22	5	6+15	3	1+0	2
9	FW	(United States) USA	Isaac Zuleta	0	0	0+0	0	0+0	0
11	FW	(Cuba) CUB	Frank López	24	7	22+1	7	1+0	0
17	FW	(United States) USA	Khalid Balogun	3	1	2+1	1	0+0	0
19	FW	(United States) USA	Michael Lawrence	14	3	12+2	3	0+0	0
23	FW	(Italy) ITA	Rocco Genzano	32	2	26+5	2	0+1	0
30	FW	(Haiti) HAI	Christopher Jean-Francois	5	0	1+4	0	0+0	0
35	FW	(Haiti) HAI	Sébatien Joseph	9	0	3+6	0	0+0	0
50	FW	(El Salvador) SLV	Roberto Molina	27	1	16+10	1	1+0	0
Left during season
5	DF	(France) FRA	Achille Truchot	0	0	0+0	0	0+0	0
6	MF	(Germany) GER	Samuel Biek	15	0	13+1	0	1+0	0
17	MF	(United States) USA	Ben Mines	4	0	1+3	0	0+0	0
21	MF	(Laos) LAO	Michael Vang	4	0	2+2	0	0+0	0
22	DF	(United States) USA	Benjamin Ofeimu	3	0	1+2	0	0+0	0
32	MF	(Peru) PER	David Mejía	5	0	2+3	0	0+0	0
67	FW	(Italy) ITA	Mattia Gagliardi	8	0	4+4	0	0+0	0
80	MF	(Jamaica) JAM	Andrew Booth	17	1	15+1	1	1+0	0

=== Goal scorers ===
Place	Position	Nation	Number	Name	Regular Season	Open Cup	Total
1	FW	(Cuba)	11	Frank López	7	0	7
2	MF	(United States)	99	Allen Gavilanes	5	0	5
2	FW	(Brazil)	7	Luis Pedro	3	2	5
3	FW	(United States)	19	Michael Lawrence	3	0	3
4	FW	(United States)	23	Rocco Genzano	2	0	2
5				Own goal	1	0	1
5	MF	(Brazil)	8	Gabriel Cabral	1	0	1
5	FW	(Italy)	16	Manuel Botta	1	0	1
5	FW	(United States)	17	Khalid Balogun	1	0	1
5	FW	(El Salvador)	50	Roberto Molina	1	0	1
5	MF	(Jamaica)	80	Andrew Booth	1	0	1

=== Disciplinary record ===
Number	Nation	Position	Name	Regular Season		Open Cup		Total	
Number	Nation	Position	Name	Booked	Sent off (straight red)	Booked	Sent off (straight red)	Booked	Sent off (straight red)
1	(Senegal)	GK	Khadim Ndiaye	1	1	0	1	1	2
3	(Ghana)	DF	Jordan Ayimbila	2	0	0	0	2	0
4	(Puerto Rico)	DF	Nicolás Cardona	10	1	0	0	10	1
5	(Jamaica)	MF	Joey DeZart	1	0	0	0	1	0
6	(Germany)	MF	Samuel Biek	4	0	0	0	4	0
7	(Brazil)	FW	Luis Pedro	3	0	0	0	3	0
8	(Brazil)	MF	Gabriel Cabral	3	0	0	0	3	0
11	(Cuba)	FW	Frank López	7	1	0	0	7	1
12	(United States)	GK	Daniel Gagliardi	1	0	0	0	1	0
13	(United States)	MF	Daltyn Knutson	5	0	1	0	6	0
14	(United States)	DF	Daniel Barbir	1	0	0	0	1	0
16	(Italy)	MF	Manuel Botta	4	1	1	0	5	1
17	(United States)	MF	Ben Mines	1	0	0	0	1	0
18	(Colombia)	DF	Junior Palacios	7	2	0	0	7	2
19	(United States)	FW	Michael Lawrence	6	0	0	0	6	0
21	(Laos)	MF	Michael Vang	1	0	0	0	1	0
23	(Italy)	FW	Rocco Genzano	6	0	0	0	6	0
29	(Venezuela)	DF	Alejandro Mitrano	10	0	0	0	10	0
30	(Haiti)	FW	Christopher Jean-Francois	2	0	0	0	2	0
31	(Uruguay)	GK	Felipe Rodriguez	1	0	1	0	2	0
33	(United States)	MF	Lucas De Paula	2	0	0	0	2	0
34	(Spain)	DF	Marco Santana	3	0	0	0	3	0
35	(Haiti)	FW	Sébatien Joseph	1	0	0	0	1	0
50	(El Salvador)	FW	Roberto Molina	3	0	0	0	3	0
67	(Italy)	FW	Mattia Gagliardi	1	0	0	0	1	0
80	(Jamaica)	MF	Andrew Booth	4	0	0	0	4	0
99	(United States)	MF	Allen Gavilanes	3	0	0	0	3	0
