= 2024 USL Championship season =

14th season of the USL Championship

USL Championship
- Season: 2024
- Dates: March 9 – October 26 (regular season); November 1 – November 21–25 (playoffs)
- Champions: Colorado Springs Switchbacks FC (1st Title)
- Players' Shield: Louisville City FC (1st Title)
- Matches: 408
- Goals: 1,082 (2.65 per match)
- Best Player: (United States) Nick Markanich Charleston Battery
- Top goalscorer: (United States) Nick Markanich Charleston Battery (28 Goals - League record)
- Best goalkeeper: (United States) Eric Dick Pittsburgh Riverhounds SC
- Biggest home win: RI 8–1 MIA (October 26)
- Biggest away win: MIA 0–4 NCA (May 25); MIA 0–4 DCFC (June 29)
- Highest scoring: NCA 4–6 LOU (August 31)
- Longest winning run: 8 games: Indy Eleven
- Longest unbeaten run: 11 games: Charleston Battery; Sacramento Republic FC
- Longest winless run: 17 games: Miami FC
- Longest losing run: 9 games: Miami FC
- Highest attendance: 13,526 LOU 3-1 CHS (August 17)
- Lowest attendance: 223 TBR 2–2 HFD (October 23) at IMG Academy in Bradenton, Florida
- Total attendance: 2,123,760
- Average attendance: 5,009
- All statistics correct as of October 26, 2024.

The 2024 USL Championship season was the 14th season of the USL Championship and the seventh season under Division II sanctioning. The 2024 season had 24 teams participating in two conferences during the regular season. Conference realignment moved Memphis 901 FC and FC Tulsa to the Western Conference, while expansion sides North Carolina FC and Rhode Island FC joined the Eastern Conference. Phoenix Rising FC are the defending league champions and the Pittsburgh Riverhounds SC are the defending Players' Shield winners.

== Teams ==
Locations of teams for the 2024 USL Championship season
Western Conference Eastern Conference

=== Changes from 2023 ===
Expansion clubs

- North Carolina FC (from USL League One)
- Rhode Island FC

Departing clubs

- Rio Grande Valley FC Toros
- San Diego Loyal SC

=== Stadiums and locations ===
Team	Stadium	Capacity
Birmingham Legion FC	Protective Stadium	47,000
Charleston Battery	Patriots Point Soccer Complex	5,000
Colorado Springs Switchbacks FC	Weidner Field	8,000
Detroit City FC	Keyworth Stadium	7,933
FC Tulsa	ONEOK Field	7,833
El Paso Locomotive FC	Southwest University Park	9,500
Hartford Athletic	Trinity Health Stadium	5,500
Indy Eleven	IU Michael A. Carroll Track & Soccer Stadium	10,524
Las Vegas Lights FC	Cashman Field	9,334
Loudoun United FC	Segra Field	5,000
Louisville City FC	Lynn Family Stadium	15,304
Memphis 901 FC	AutoZone Park	10,000
Miami FC	Riccardo Silva Stadium	25,000
Monterey Bay FC	Cardinale Stadium	6,000
North Carolina FC	WakeMed Soccer Park	10,000
New Mexico United	Rio Grande Credit Union Field at Isotopes Park	13,500
Oakland Roots SC	Pioneer Stadium	5,000
Orange County SC	Championship Soccer Stadium	5,000
Phoenix Rising FC	Phoenix Rising Soccer Stadium	10,000
Pittsburgh Riverhounds SC	Highmark Stadium	5,000
Rhode Island FC	Beirne Stadium	5,252
Sacramento Republic FC	Heart Health Park	11,569
San Antonio FC	Toyota Field	8,296
Tampa Bay Rowdies	Al Lang Stadium	7,227

1. Non-soccer specific stadium.

=== Personnel and sponsorships ===
Team	Head coach	Captain(s)	Kit manufacturer	Kit sponsor
Birmingham Legion FC	(United States) Tom Soehn	(Democratic Republic of the Congo) Phanuel Kavita	Hummel	Coca-Cola
Charleston Battery	(United States) Ben Pirmann	(Trinidad and Tobago) Leland Archer	Hummel	Volvo
Colorado Springs Switchbacks FC	(Republic of Ireland) James Chambers	(United States) Matt Mahoney	Capelli Sport	CommonSpirit Health
Detroit City FC	(England) Danny Dichio	(Republic of Ireland) Stephen Carroll	Adidas	Metro Detroit Area Chevrolet Dealers
El Paso Locomotive FC	(Colombia) Wilmer Cabrera	(Spain) Yuma	Hummel	Southwest University at El Paso
FC Tulsa	(United States) Mario Sanchez	(United States) Bradley Bourgeois	Puma	Williams
Hartford Athletic	(United States) Brendan Burke	(Northern Ireland) Niall Logue	Hummel	Trinity Health of New England
Indy Eleven	(England) Sean McAuley	(United States) Tyler Gibson	Under Armour	Ford
Las Vegas Lights FC	(United States) Dennis Sanchez	(United States) Charlie Adams	Hummel	LiUNA!
Loudoun United FC	(United States) Ryan Martin	(United States) Zach Ryan (United States) Cole Turner	Capelli Sport	CORAS
Louisville City FC	(United States) Danny Cruz	(Republic of Ireland) Niall McCabe	Adidas	GE Appliances
Memphis 901 FC	(Scotland) Stephen Glass	(Trinidad and Tobago) Leston Paul	Charly	Cancer Kickers
Miami FC	(Brazil) Marcello Alves (interim)	(Puerto Rico) Nicolas Cardona	Macron	micromobility.com
Monterey Bay FC	(England) Jordan Stewart	(United States) Kai Greene	Puma	Montage Health
New Mexico United	(United States) Eric Quill	(United States) Sam Hamilton	Puma	Meow Wolf (home); Sandia Resort and Casino (away)
North Carolina FC	(United States) John Bradford	(England) Paco Craig	Adidas	EmergeOrtho
Oakland Roots SC	(Turks and Caicos Islands) Gavin Glinton (interim)	(Trinidad and Tobago) Neveal Hackshaw	Charly	Elevance Health
Orange County SC	(England) Danny Stone (interim)	(Norway) Markus Nakkim (United States) Dillon Powers	Hummel	Hoag
Phoenix Rising FC	(Spain) Diego Gómez (interim)	(Sweden) John Stenberg	Adidas	Carvana
Pittsburgh Riverhounds SC	(United States) Bob Lilley	(United States) Danny Griffin	Charly	Allegheny Health Network (home); 84 Lumber (away)
Rhode Island FC	(Bermuda) Khano Smith	(Spain) Koke Vegas	Capelli Sport	Breeze Airways
Sacramento Republic FC	(England) Mark Briggs	(United States) Rodrigo López	Hummel	UCDavis Health
San Antonio FC	(Canada) Alen Marcina		Puma	Community First Health Plans
Tampa Bay Rowdies	(Scotland) Robbie Neilson	(Mexico) Aaron Guillen	Puma	DEX Imaging

=== Managerial changes ===
Team	Outgoing manager	Manner of departure	Date of vacancy	Incoming manager	Date of appointment
Detroit City FC	(England) Trevor James	Promoted to sporting director	October 29, 2023	(England) Danny Dichio	November 29, 2023
Hartford Athletic	(United States) Omid Namazi	Fired	November 1, 2023	(United States) Brendan Burke	December 12, 2023
Orange County SC	(Denmark) Morten Karlsen (interim)	End of interim period	November 6, 2023	(Denmark) Morten Karlsen	November 6, 2023
Tampa Bay Rowdies	(England) Nicky Law (interim)	End of interim period	November 9, 2023	(Scotland) Robbie Neilson	November 9, 2023
Miami FC	(England) Lewis Neal (interim)	End of interim period	November 9, 2023	(Italy) Antonio Nocerino	November 14, 2023
Indy Eleven	(England) Mark Lowry	Mutual Separation	November 28, 2023	(England) Sean McAuley	January 8, 2024
Colorado Springs Switchbacks	(Republic of Ireland) Stephen Hogan	Promoted to sporting director / GM	January 5, 2024	(Republic of Ireland) James Chambers	January 5, 2024
Phoenix Rising FC	(Venezuela) Juan Guerra	Mutual Separation	January 8, 2024	(England) Danny Stone	January 18, 2024
FC Tulsa	(United States) Blair Gavin	Mutual Separation	January 8, 2024	(United States) Mario Sanchez	January 16, 2024
Las Vegas Lights FC	(Canada) Isidro Sánchez	Mutual Separation	January 29, 2024	(United States) Dennis Sanchez	January 29, 2024
Oakland Roots SC	(Puerto Rico) Noah Delgado	Fired	April 28, 2024	(Turks and Caicos Islands) Gavin Glinton (interim)	April 28, 2024
El Paso Locomotive FC	(United States) Brian Clarhaut	Fired	May 17, 2024	(Colombia) Wilmer Cabrera	May 20, 2024
Orange County SC	(Denmark) Morten Karlsen	Hired by (Denmark) Lyngby BK	June 25, 2024	(England) Paul Hardyman (interim)	June 25, 2024
Phoenix Rising FC	(England) Danny Stone	Fired	June 29, 2024	(Spain) Diego Gómez (interim)	June 29, 2024
Monterey Bay FC	(Canada) Frank Yallop	Fired	July 31, 2024	(Jamaica) Simon Dawkins (interim)	August 1, 2024
Monterey Bay FC	(Jamaica) Simon Dawkins (interim)	End of interim period	August 5, 2024	(England) Jordan Stewart	August 5, 2024
Orange County SC	(England) Paul Hardyman (interim)	Mutual Separation	August 29, 2024	(England) Danny Stone (interim)	August 29, 2024
Miami FC	(Italy) Antonio Nocerino	Mutual Separation	October 16, 2024	(Brazil) Marcello Alves (interim)	October 16, 2024

== Regular season ==
=== Format ===
The teams played a balanced 34-game schedule. Each team played their conference opponents twice and played one game each with the teams in the opposite conference. The top 8 teams in each conference made the playoffs.

=== Eastern Conference ===
Pos	Team	Pld	W	L	T	GF	GA	GD	Pts	Qualification
1	Louisville City FC (S)	34	24	6	4	86	43	+43	76	Playoffs
2	Charleston Battery	34	18	6	10	68	35	+33	64	Playoffs
3	Detroit City FC	34	15	8	11	46	32	+14	56	Playoffs
4	Indy Eleven	34	14	11	9	49	50	−1	51	Playoffs
5	Rhode Island FC	34	12	7	15	56	41	+15	51	Playoffs
6	Tampa Bay Rowdies	34	14	12	8	55	46	+9	50	Playoffs
7	Pittsburgh Riverhounds SC	34	12	10	12	41	28	+13	48	Playoffs
8	North Carolina FC	34	13	12	9	54	43	+11	48	Playoffs
9	Birmingham Legion FC	34	13	15	6	44	51	−7	45	
10	Hartford Athletic	34	12	14	8	39	52	−13	44	
11	Loudoun United FC	34	11	14	9	44	39	+5	42	
12	Miami FC	34	3	29	2	26	89	−63	11	

Source: USL Championship Standings
Rules for classification: 1) head-to-head points; 2) head-to-head goal differential; 3) points-per game within conference; 4) total wins; 5) total goal differential; 6) total goals scored; 7) points earned against top four Conference finishers; 8) disciplinary points; 9) coin toss or drawing of lots
(S) Players' Shield winner

=== Western Conference ===
Pos	Team	Pld	W	L	T	GF	GA	GD	Pts	Qualification
1	New Mexico United	34	18	11	5	46	44	+2	59	Playoffs
2	Colorado Springs Switchbacks FC (C)	34	15	12	7	48	40	+8	52	Playoffs
3	Memphis 901 FC	34	14	11	9	52	41	+11	51	Playoffs
4	Las Vegas Lights FC	34	13	10	11	49	46	+3	50	Playoffs
5	Sacramento Republic FC	34	13	11	10	46	34	+12	49	Playoffs
6	Orange County SC	34	13	14	7	38	45	−7	46	Playoffs
7	Oakland Roots SC	34	13	16	5	37	57	−20	44	Playoffs
8	Phoenix Rising FC	34	11	14	9	33	39	−6	42	Playoffs
9	San Antonio FC	34	10	15	9	36	49	−13	39	
10	FC Tulsa	34	9	14	11	33	48	−15	38	
11	Monterey Bay FC	34	8	16	10	29	44	−15	34	
12	El Paso Locomotive FC	34	8	18	8	27	46	−19	32	

Source: USL Championship Standings
Rules for classification: 1) head-to-head points; 2) head-to-head goal differential; 3) points-per game within conference; 4) total wins; 5) total goal differential; 6) total goals scored; 7) points earned against top four Conference finishers; 8) disciplinary points; 9) coin toss or drawing of lots
(C) Champions

=== Results table ===
Color Key: Home • Away • Neutral • Win • Loss • Draw
Club	Match																																	
Club	1	2	3	4	5	6	7	8	9	10	11	12	13	14	15	16	17	18	19	20	21	22	23	24	25	26	27	28	29	30	31	32	33	34
Birmingham Legion FC (BHM)	PHX	HFD	LOU	LDN	NCA	MIA	MEM	TUL	TBR	CHS	SAC	ELP	IND	SAN	DET	LOU	CHS	COS	RI	NMU	OCO	HFD	MB	DET	PGH	RI	TBR	LND	MIA	PGH	NCA	LVL	IND	OAK
Birmingham Legion FC (BHM)	1–0	0–1	0–5	3–1	1–1	1–0	0–3	2–2	1–0	0–1	0–0	3–1	0–1	3–0	2–1	1–4	0–2	2–1	1–3	1–1	3–0	2–2	2–1	0–1	0–3	0–2	2–0	2–4	1–0	1–1	2–3	0–3	2–3	5–0
Charleston Battery (CHS)	NCA	OAK	NMU	MIA	RI	LOU	IND	TUL	LVL	HFD	BHM	ELP	MB	PGH	DET	PHX	NCA	BHM	HFD	MIA	LDN	TBR	IND	MEM	LOU	OCO	SAN	SAC	COS	TBR	DET	PGH	RI	LDN
Charleston Battery (CHS)	0–0	1–1	4–0	2–1	0–0	3–2	4–2	4–1	6–0	1–0	1–0	1–2	0–0	0–0	0–2	0–0	5–2	2–0	2–2	2–0	2–1	2–4	5–0	3–1	1–3	6–0	1–1	2–1	0–2	3–1	2–2	0–2	1–1	2–1
Colorado Springs Switchbacks (COS)	MIA	DET	SAN	SAC	PHX	IND	OAK	ELP	HFD	RI	OAK	MEM	OCO	LVL	NMU	MB	TUL	BHM	LOU	LVL	PHX	NCA	PGH	NMU	MEM	TUL	TBR	CHS	ELP	LDN	OCO	SAN	MB	SAC
Colorado Springs Switchbacks (COS)	0–2	1–2	0–2	0–2	0–1	1–1	2–0	2–0	2–0	3–1	1–0	1–1	4–2	3–3	0–1	1–0	1–0	1–2	1–2	1–1	2–0	1–4	2–2	0–1	3–1	4–1	4–2	2–0	1–1	1–1	0–2	1–2	1–0	1–0
Detroit City FC (DET)	COS	LDN	IND	NCA	OAK	PGH	LDN	PHX	LOU	OCO	RI	CHS	BHM	MIA	TBR	MEM	NCA	SAC	HFD	RI	PGH	LVL	BHM	TBR	TUL	HFD	ELP	NMU	LOU	MB	CHS	IND	MIA	SAN
Detroit City FC (DET)	2–1	2–1	2–1	1–0	3–1	0–2	0–0	1–1	1–5	2–3	2–0	2–0	1–2	4–0	1–1	0–1	1–1	0–1	0–1	1–1	0–0	1–1	1–0	3–2	0–1	1–1	0–0	1–0	2–1	2–0	2–2	0–0	3–0	4–1
El Paso Locomotive (ELP)	HFD	MB	LOU	LVL	NMU	OAK	TBR	TUL	COS	LDN	MEM	CHS	BHM	SAN	PHX	OAK	RI	LVL	PHX	NMU	MEM	MIA	SAC	OCO	MB	DET	IND	COS	NCA	TUL	SAN	OCO	SAC	PGH
El Paso Locomotive (ELP)	0–1	1–1	0–1	0–1	2–3	2–3	1–1	0–1	0–2	2–0	1–2	2–1	1–3	1–0	1–1	1–2	0–3	0–2	0–2	1–2	0–0	2–1	0–2	1–0	0–0	0–0	1–3	1–1	1–0	1–0	2–2	0–2	2–1	0–2
Hartford Athletic (HFD)	ELP	BHM	NCA	MIA	SAN	LOU	CHS	COS	IND	MB	RI	NMU	PGH	TBR	SAC	LDN	CHS	PGH	PHX	DET	BHM	RI	LVL	LOU	DET	IND	MEM	MIA	OAK	LDN	NCA	TUL	TBR	OCO
Hartford Athletic (HFD)	1–0	1–0	1–2	3–2	1–3	0–6	0–1	0–2	1–4	2–1	1–1	0–1	2–0	0–1	0–1	0–3	2–2	1–3	0–0	1–0	2–2	0–3	2–1	2–1	1–1	0–0	0–0	3–0	2–0	0–2	4–3	2–1	2–2	2–3
Indy Eleven (IND)	OAK	MEM	SAC	DET	LOU	CHS	COS	NCA	MB	MIA	HFD	PHX	PGH	BHM	SAN	OCO	RI	LDN	TBR	TUL	CHS	RI	NMU	LVL	PGH	HFD	ELP	NCA	MIA	LOU	LDN	DET	BHM	TBR
Indy Eleven (IND)	1–2	2–1	1–1	1–2	3–5	2–4	1–1	2–1	1–0	3–1	4–1	2–1	2–1	1–0	1–0	0–1	3–3	1–1	0–2	0–0	0–5	1–0	1–3	2–3	1–1	0–0	3–1	0–2	4–0	2–2	1–0	0–0	3–2	0–3
Las Vegas Lights (LVL)	MEM	TUL	ELP	OAK	SAN	MB	RI	CHS	NMU	SAN	LOU	TBR	PHX	MIA	LDN	COS	MEM	PGH	SAC	ELP	COS	NMU	DET	HFD	IND	OCO	TUL	MB	SAC	PHX	OCO	BHM	OAK	NCA
Las Vegas Lights (LVL)	1–2	1–3	1–0	3–0	1–0	1–3	1–2	0–6	1–2	1–1	2–2	0–1	0–0	3–1	1–1	3–3	1–1	2–0	1–0	2–0	1–1	2–1	1–1	1–2	3–2	3–2	1–1	0–0	2–1	2–1	1–1	3–0	2–3	1–2
Loudoun United FC (LDN)	SAN	NCA	DET	BHM	MEM	LOU	SAC	DET	ELP	NCA	MB	OCO	TUL	LVL	MIA	TBR	HFD	IND	CHS	PGH	MIA	OAK	TBR	RI	PHX	LOU	BHM	NMU	COS	HFD	IND	RI	PGH	CHS
Loudoun United FC (LDN)	2–2	3–1	1–2	1–3	2–1	0–1	1–3	0–0	0–2	0–2	3–0	2–0	3–0	1–1	2–2	2–0	3–0	1–1	1–2	1–1	4–1	1–3	2–0	0–0	0–1	0–1	4–2	0–1	1–1	2–0	0–1	0–0	0–2	1–2
Louisville City FC (LOU)	ELP	PGH	BHM	IND	CHS	LDN	HFD	OCO	LVL	RI	DET	MIA	NCA	TBR	PGH	RI	BHM	OAK	COS	MB	NMU	SAC	CHS	HFD	NCA	LDN	TUL	DET	MEM	MIA	IND	TBR	SAN	PHX
Louisville City FC (LOU)	1–0	3–1	5–0	5–3	2–3	1–0	6–0	3–0	2–2	0–0	5–1	2–1	2–1	2–3	1–0	2–5	4–1	0–1	2–1	4–1	1–0	4–3	3–1	1–2	6–4	1–0	1–0	1–2	4–2	3–0	2–2	2–1	1–1	4–1
Memphis 901 FC (MEM)	LVL	IND	SAC	OCO	LDN	MB	BHM	TBR	MB	ELP	PGH	SAN	COS	RI	NMU	LVL	PHX	OCO	DET	TUL	SAN	ELP	CHS	MIA	TUL	OAK	COS	HFD	NCA	LOU	OAK	SAC	PHX	NMU
Memphis 901 FC (MEM)	2–1	1–2	0–1	0–2	1–2	1–2	3–0	4–1	2–2	2–1	2–0	0–1	1–1	2–2	2–1	1–1	5–1	1–4	1–0	0–1	1–0	0–0	1–3	5–1	2–0	1–1	1–3	0–0	3–0	2–4	1–1	0–0	1–0	3–2
Miami FC (MIA)	COS	SAC	OCO	CHS	HFD	TBR	BHM	SAN	PGH	IND	PHX	NCA	LOU	LVL	TUL	LDN	DET	NCA	RI	CHS	OAK	LDN	ELP	MEM	TBR	MB	NMU	HFD	BHM	IND	LOU	PGH	DET	RI
Miami FC (MIA)	2–0	0–1	2–2	1–2	2–3	2–5	0–1	2–1	0–1	1–3	0–2	0–4	1–2	1–3	1–2	2–2	0–4	1–4	2–3	0–2	1–2	1–4	1–2	1–5	0–2	1–0	0–1	0–3	0–1	0–4	0–3	0–4	0–3	1–8
Monterey Bay FC (MB)	ELP	PHX	RI	SAN	OAK	LVL	MEM	OCO	IND	MEM	LDN	HFD	CHS	NMU	SAC	NCA	OAK	COS	PGH	TUL	LOU	TBR	BHM	NMU	ELP	MIA	SAN	LVL	OCO	DET	PHX	SAC	COS	TUL
Monterey Bay FC (MB)	1–1	1–0	2–2	1–2	1–0	3–1	2–1	0–2	0–1	2–2	0–3	1–2	0–0	1–0	0–2	0–2	2–1	0–1	1–0	0–0	1–4	2–2	1–2	2–3	0–0	0–1	0–1	0–0	0–0	0–2	2–1	2–2	0–1	1–2
New Mexico United (NMU)	PGH	RI	CHS	PHX	ELP	NCA	TBR	LVL	OAK	SAN	MB	HFD	MEM	COS	SAN	OCO	BHM	ELP	LVL	LOU	IND	TUL	MB	COS	OAK	MIA	DET	SAC	LDN	SAC	PHX	TUL	OCO	MEM
New Mexico United (NMU)	1–0	1–1	0–4	1–0	3–2	3–2	0–3	2–1	2–1	2–1	0–1	1–0	1–2	1–0	3–2	2–0	1–1	2–1	1–2	0–1	3–1	3–3	3–2	1–0	0–1	1–0	0–1	3–1	1–0	0–4	1–2	1–1	0–0	2–3
North Carolina FC (NCA)	CHS	LDN	TBR	HFD	DET	BHM	NMU	IND	RI	LDN	PGH	MIA	LOU	MB	PGH	CHS	MIA	SAC	DET	RI	OCO	COS	SAN	PHX	LOU	OAK	MEM	IND	ELP	BHM	TUL	HFD	TBR	LVL
North Carolina FC (NCA)	0–0	1–3	1–1	2–1	0–1	1–1	2–3	1–2	0–0	2–0	1–1	4–0	1–2	2–0	0–0	2–5	4–1	0–0	1–1	1–2	1–0	4–1	0–1	0–0	4–6	5–0	0–3	2–0	0–1	3–2	2–0	3–4	2–0	2–1
Oakland Roots SC (OAK)	IND	CHS	PHX	LVL	MB	ELP	DET	COS	SAN	NMU	OCO	TUL	COS	TBR	SAC	ELP	MB	OCO	LOU	PGH	SAC	MIA	LDN	RI	MEM	NMU	NCA	SAN	HFD	TUL	MEM	PHX	LVL	BHM
Oakland Roots SC (OAK)	2–1	1–1	0–1	0–3	0–1	3–2	1–3	0–2	2–2	1–2	2–1	1–0	0–1	1–0	3–2	2–1	1–2	2–0	1–0	0–5	2–5	2–1	3–1	1–1	1–1	1–0	0–5	0–1	0–2	0–1	1–1	0–1	3–2	0–5
Orange County SC (OCO)	SAC	PGH	MIA	TUL	MEM	SAN	SAC	MB	LOU	OAK	LDN	DET	PHX	COS	IND	OAK	NMU	MEM	TBR	SAN	BHM	NCA	TUL	ELP	CHS	LVL	RI	MB	PHX	LVL	COS	ELP	NMU	HFD
Orange County SC (OCO)	2–2	2–0	2–2	1–0	2–0	0–0	0–2	2–0	0–3	1–2	0–2	3–2	1–2	2–4	1–0	0–2	0–2	4–1	0–2	2–0	0–3	0–1	0–0	0–1	0–6	2–3	1–0	0–0	2–0	1–1	2–0	2–0	0–0	3–2
Phoenix Rising FC (PHX)	BHM	MB	OAK	NMU	TUL	COS	PGH	RI	SAC	DET	MIA	IND	LVL	OCO	ELP	CHS	MEM	SAN	ELP	HFD	COS	TBR	NCA	LDN	TUL	SAC	SAN	OCO	LVL	MB	NMU	OAK	MEM	LOU
Phoenix Rising FC (PHX)	0–1	0–1	1–0	0–1	3–3	1–0	1–3	3–1	1–1	1–1	2–0	1–2	0–0	2–1	1–1	0–0	1–5	1–2	2–0	0–0	0–2	0–0	0–0	1–0	1–0	0–2	4–0	0–2	1–2	1–2	2–1	1–0	0–1	1–4
Pittsburgh Riverhounds (PGH)	NMU	OCO	LOU	TBR	RI	PHX	DET	MIA	TUL	NCA	MEM	IND	CHS	HFD	LOU	NCA	LVL	MB	OAK	HFD	LDN	SAC	DET	SAN	COS	BHM	IND	RI	TBR	BHM	MIA	CHS	LDN	ELP
Pittsburgh Riverhounds (PGH)	0–1	0–2	1–3	0–0	0–0	3–1	2–0	1–0	2–2	1–1	0–2	1–2	0–0	0–2	0–1	0–0	0–2	0–1	5–0	3–1	1–1	1–0	0–0	0–0	2–2	3–0	1–1	2–0	1–2	1–1	4–0	2–0	2–0	2–0
Rhode Island FC (RI)	NMU	MB	TBR	CHS	PGH	LVL	PHX	NCA	SAC	COS	LOU	HFD	DET	MEM	LOU	ELP	IND	MIA	BHM	NCA	DET	IND	HFD	OAK	LDN	BHM	PGH	OCO	TUL	SAN	TBR	LDN	CHS	MIA
Rhode Island FC (RI)	1–1	2–2	1–4	0–0	0–0	2–1	1–3	0–0	2–2	1–3	0–0	1–1	0–2	2–2	5–2	3–0	3–3	3–2	3–1	2–1	1–1	0–1	3–0	1–1	0–0	2–0	0–2	0–1	2–1	3–1	3–1	0–0	1–1	8–1
Sacramento Republic (SAC)	OCO	MIA	IND	MEM	COS	TUL	OCO	LDN	PHX	RI	BHM	TBR	MB	OAK	TUL	HFD	LVL	NCA	OAK	DET	PGH	LOU	ELP	SAN	CHS	PHX	NMU	LVL	NMU	SAN	MB	MEM	ELP	COS
Sacramento Republic (SAC)	2–2	1–0	1–1	1–0	2–0	1–1	2–0	3–1	1–1	2–2	0–0	0–1	2–0	2–3	0–0	1–0	0–1	0–0	5–2	1–0	0–1	3–4	2–0	1–0	1–2	2–0	1–3	1–2	4–0	1–2	2–2	0–0	1–2	0–1
San Antonio FC (SAN)	LDN	TBR	COS	MB	LVL	OCO	HFD	MIA	OAK	LVL	NMU	MEM	ELP	TUL	IND	BHM	NMU	PHX	OCO	MEM	TUL	PGH	NCA	SAC	CHS	MB	OAK	PHX	RI	SAC	ELP	COS	LOU	DET
San Antonio FC (SAN)	2–2	2–2	2–0	2–1	0–1	0–0	3–1	1–2	2–2	1–1	1–2	1–0	0–1	1–2	0–1	0–3	2–3	2–1	0–2	0–1	1–3	0–0	1–0	0–1	1–1	1–0	1–0	0–4	1–3	2–1	2–2	2–1	1–1	1–4
Tampa Bay Rowdies (TBR)	SAN	NCA	RI	PGH	MIA	ELP	NMU	MEM	BHM	TUL	LVL	SAC	OAK	LOU	HFD	LDN	DET	OCO	IND	CHS	MB	PHX	LDN	DET	MIA	COS	BHM	PGH	CHS	RI	LOU	NCA	HFD	IND
Tampa Bay Rowdies (TBR)	2–2	1–1	4–1	0–0	5–2	1–1	3–0	1–4	0–1	5–0	1–0	1–0	0–1	3–2	1–0	0–2	1–1	2–0	2–0	4–2	2–2	0–0	0–2	2–3	2–0	2–4	0–2	2–1	1–3	1–3	1–2	0–2	2–2	3–0
FC Tulsa (TUL)	LVL	OCO	PHX	SAC	CHS	ELP	BHM	PGH	TBR	OAK	LDN	SAN	MIA	SAC	COS	MB	MEM	IND	SAN	OCO	NMU	MEM	DET	COS	PHX	LVL	LOU	RI	OAK	ELP	NCA	NMU	HFD	MB
FC Tulsa (TUL)	3–1	0–1	3–3	1–1	1–4	1–0	2–2	2–2	0–5	0–1	0–3	2–1	2–1	0–0	0–1	0–0	1–0	0–0	3–1	0–0	3–3	0–2	1–0	1–4	0–1	1–1	0–1	1–2	1–0	0–1	0–2	1–1	1–2	2–1

Notes

- Last 2 Tampa Bay Rowdies home games were moved to IMG Academy due to hurricanes Helene and Milton.

== Playoffs ==
=== Bracket ===
Conference Quarterfinals; November 1–3	Conference Semifinals; November 9–10
E1	Louisville City FC	3
E8	North Carolina FC	2
E1	Louisville City FC	0
E5	Rhode Island FC	3
E4	Indy Eleven	2
E5	Rhode Island FC	3
Eastern Conference
E3	Detroit City FC	1 (1)
E6	Tampa Bay Rowdies (p)	1 (3)
E6	Tampa Bay Rowdies	1
E2	Charleston Battery	2
E2	Charleston Battery	1
E7	Pittsburgh Riverhounds SC	0
W1	New Mexico United	2
W8	Phoenix Rising FC	1
W1	New Mexico United	0
W4	Las Vegas Lights FC	1
W4	Las Vegas Lights FC (p)	0 (3)
W5	Sacramento Republic FC	0 (2)
Western Conference
W3	Memphis 901 FC	0
W6	Orange County SC (a.e.t.)	1
W6	Orange County SC	1
W2	Colorado Springs Switchbacks FC (a.e.t.)	2
W2	Colorado Springs Switchbacks FC	2
W7	Oakland Roots SC	0

Conference Finals; November 16
E5	Rhode Island FC	2
E2	Charleston Battery	1
W4	Las Vegas Lights FC	0
W2	Colorado Springs Switchbacks FC	1

USL Championship Final; November 23
E5	Rhode Island FC	0
W2	Colorado Springs Switchbacks FC	3

== Schedule ==
=== Conference Quarterfinals ===
November 1, 2024 West	Las Vegas Lights FC	0–0 (a.e.t.) (3–2 p)	Sacramento Republic FC	Las Vegas, Nevada
7:30 PM PDT	Noël (yellow card) 38'	Report	Ross (yellow card) 86'	Stadium: Cashman Field; Attendance: 2,415; Referee: Elton Garcia
	Penalties
	Bennett (penalty missed); Ngando (penalty missed); Gannon (penalty scored); Doody (penalty scored); Noël (penalty scored)		(penalty missed) Portillo; (penalty missed) Viader; (penalty missed) Cicerone; (penalty scored) Ross; (penalty scored) Felipe

November 2, 2024 West	Memphis 901 FC	0–1 (a.e.t.)	Orange County SC	Memphis, Tennessee
1:00 PM CDT	Ward (yellow card) 5'; Paul (yellow card) 64'; Turci (yellow card) 68' (red card) 79'; Lapa (yellow card) 82'	Report	Lambe (yellow card) 52'; Casiple (yellow card) 58'; Nakkim (yellow card) 82'; Norris (yellow card) 112'; Powers 116'	Stadium: AutoZone Park; Attendance: 3,014; Referee: Ricardo Fierro

November 2, 2024 East	Charleston Battery	1–0	Pittsburgh Riverhounds SC	Mount Pleasant, South Carolina
6:30 PM EDT	Markanich 8'; Molloy (yellow card) 33'	Report	Hogan (yellow card) 53'	Stadium: Patriots Point Soccer Complex; Attendance: 4,287; Referee: Nabil Bensalah

November 2, 2024 East	Detroit City FC	1–1 (a.e.t.) (1–3 p)	Tampa Bay Rowdies	Hamtramck, Michigan
7:00 PM EDT	Rodriguez (yellow card) 19'; Moon 49' (o.g.); Kissiedou (yellow card) 52'; Amoo-Mensah (yellow card) 56'; Bryant (yellow card) 91'; Murphy (yellow card) 118'; Carroll (yellow card) 118'	Report	Jennings 19'; Bodily (yellow card) 41'; Niyongabire (yellow card) 78'; Doherty (yellow card) 116'	Stadium: Keyworth Stadium; Attendance: 7,183; Referee: Sergii Demianchuk
	Penalties
	Rodriguez (penalty missed); Murphy (penalty missed); Morris (penalty scored); Amoh (penalty missed)		(penalty missed) Arteaga; (penalty missed) Pérez; (penalty scored) Munjoma; (penalty scored) Murphy; (penalty scored) Doherty

November 2, 2024 East	Louisville City FC	3–2	North Carolina FC	Louisville, Kentucky
7:30 PM EDT	Dia 20'; Davila 24'; Perez 54'; Charpie (yellow card) 90+3'; Adams (yellow card) 90+4'	Report	Anderson 11'; Batista (yellow card) 59'; Washington 90+4'	Stadium: Lynn Family Stadium; Attendance: 8,875; Referee: Matthew Corrigan

November 2, 2024 West	Colorado Springs Switchbacks	2–0	Oakland Roots SC	Colorado Springs, Colorado
6:00 PM MDT	Henriquez 41'; Magee (yellow card) 49'; Damus 56' (pen.); Hanya (yellow card) 70'; Huerman (yellow card) 79'; Rocha (yellow card) 80'	Report	Margvelashvili (yellow card) 55'; Riley (yellow card) 64'; Diaz (yellow card) 90+5'; Njie (yellow card) 90+6'	Stadium: Weidner Field; Attendance: 7,463; Referee: Abdou Ndiaye

November 3, 2024 East	Indy Eleven	2–3	Rhode Island FC	Indianapolis, Indiana
1:00 PM EST	Quinn 35'; Martínez (yellow card) 45+2' (goal) 76'; Foster (yellow card) 58'; Musa (yellow card) 69'; Ofeimu (yellow card) 90+2'	Report	Williams 19' (pen.), 38', 52'; Herivaux (yellow card) 81'	Stadium: Michael A. Carroll Stadium; Attendance: 7,623; Referee: Joshua Encarnacion

November 3, 2024 West	New Mexico United	2–1	Phoenix Rising FC	Albuquerque, New Mexico
6:00 PM MST	Seymore 58'; Herbert (yellow card) 76'; Akale 85'	Report	Varela 49'; Fuenmayor (yellow card) 61'; Wyke (yellow card) 63'	Stadium: Rio Grande Credit Union Field at Isotopes Park; Attendance: 11,447; Referee: Lorenzo Hernandez

=== Conference Semifinals ===
November 9, 2024 East	Louisville City FC	0–3	Rhode Island FC	Louisville, Kentucky
7:30 PM EST		Report	Williams 9', 78'; Nodarse (yellow card) 11'; Holstad (yellow card) 72'; Dikwa 90+2'; Yao (yellow card) 90+7'	Stadium: Lynn Family Stadium; Attendance: 9,510; Referee: Elton Garcia

November 9, 2024 West	New Mexico United	0–1	Las Vegas Lights FC	Albuquerque, New Mexico
7:30 PM MST	Quill (yellow card) 40'; Akale (yellow card) 89'	Report	Hafferty (yellow card) 6'; Pinzón (yellow card) 54'; Bennett 86'; Gyau (yellow card) 87'	Stadium: Rio Grande Credit Union Field at Isotopes Park; Attendance: 10,049; Referee: Natalie Simon

November 10, 2024 East	Charleston Battery	2–1	Tampa Bay Rowdies	Mount Pleasant, South Carolina
1:00 PM EST	Torres (yellow card) 9'; Smith (yellow card) 29'; Segbers (yellow card) 45+4'; Chapman (yellow card) 48'; Markanich 50'; Molloy 83'	Report	Arteaga 30' (yellow card) 51'; Guillén (yellow card) 38'; Jennings (yellow card) 45+6'	Stadium: Patriots Point Soccer Complex; Attendance: 5,079; Referee: Matt Thompson

November 10, 2024 West	Colorado Springs Switchbacks	2–1 (a.e.t.)	Orange County SC	Colorado Springs, Colorado
4:30 PM MST	Zandi 10', 105+1' (yellow card) 69'	Report	Zubak 4'; Casiple (yellow card) 85'; Powers (yellow card) 108'	Stadium: Weidner Field; Attendance: 7,236; Referee: Lorenzo Hernandez

=== Conference Finals ===
November 16, 2024 East	Charleston Battery	1–2	Rhode Island FC	Mount Pleasant, South Carolina
5:00 PM (EST)	Markanich (yellow card) 52'; Torres 61'; Ycaza (yellow card) 90+3'	Report	Yao 43'; Herivaux (yellow card) 45+3'; Fuson 53'; Holstad (yellow card) 69'; Williams (yellow card) 76'; Doyle (yellow card) 89'; Dikwa (yellow card) 90+2'	Stadium: Patriots Point Soccer Complex; Attendance: 5,087; Referee: Calin Radosav

November 16, 2024 West	Colorado Springs Switchbacks	1–0	Las Vegas Lights FC	Colorado Springs, Colorado
7:00 PM (MST)	Tejada 38'; Henríquez (yellow card) 84'	Report	Howell (yellow card) 45'; Nigro (yellow card) 54'	Stadium: Weidner Field; Attendance: 8,023; Referee: Elton Garcia

=== USL Championship Final ===
November 23, 2024
10:00 AM (MST)

Colorado Springs Switchbacks	3–0	Rhode Island FC
Mahoney (yellow card) 14'; Tejada 22'; Henríquez 42'; Damus 53'	Report

Weidner Field, Colorado Springs, Colorado
Attendance: 8,023
Referee: Ricardo Fierro

Championship Game MVP: (Panama) Juan Tejada (COS)

== Regular season statistical leaders ==
As of October 26, 2024

=== Top scorers ===
Rank	Player	Club	Goals
1	(United States) Nick Markanich	Charleston Battery	28
2	(United States) Wilson Harris	Louisville City FC	19
3	(Venezuela) Manuel Arteaga	Tampa Bay Rowdies	17
4	(United States) Cal Jennings	Tampa Bay Rowdies	15
5	(Jamaica) Khori Bennett	Las Vegas Lights FC	14
5	(United States) MD Myers	Charleston Battery	14
7	(Saint Vincent and the Grenadines) Oalex Anderson	North Carolina FC	12
7	(United States) Evan Conway	North Carolina FC	12
7	(Haiti) Ronaldo Damus	Colorado Springs Switchbacks	12
7	(Scotland) Greg Hurst	New Mexico United	12
7	(Uganda) Edward Kizza	Pittsburgh Riverhounds SC	12
7	(England) Kieran Phillips	Sacramento Republic FC	12
7	(United States) Johnny Rodriguez	Oakland Roots SC	12

=== Hat-tricks ===
Player	Club	Against	Result	Date
(United States) Wilson Harris	Louisville City FC	Indy Eleven	5–3 (H)	April 6
(United States) Nick Markanich	Charleston Battery	Las Vegas Lights FC	6–0 (H)	April 27
(United States) MD Myers	Charleston Battery	North Carolina FC	5–2 (H)	June 28
(United States) Nick Markanich	Charleston Battery	Orange County SC	6–0 (H)	August 24
(Sierra Leone) Augustine Williams	Indy Eleven	Miami FC	4–0 (H)	September 28
(France) Bertin Jacquesson	Pittsburgh Riverhounds SC	Miami FC	4–0 (A)	October 5
(United States) JJ Williams	Rhode Island FC	Miami FC	8–1 (H)	October 26

Notes

(H) – Home team
(A) – Away team

Scored four goals.

=== Top assists ===
Rank	Player	Club	Assists
1	(United States) Noah Fuson	Rhode Island FC	10
2	(Mexico) Jorge Hernandez	San Antonio FC	9
3	(England) Jack Gurr	Sacramento Republic FC	8
4	(United States) Memo Diaz	Oakland Roots SC	7
4	(United States) Jake Morris	Louisville City FC	7
4	(France) Valentin Noël	Las Vegas Lights FC	7
4	(United States) Adrien Perez	Louisville City FC	7
4	(United States) Aedan Stanley	Indy Eleven	7
4	(United States) JJ Williams	Rhode Island FC	7
10	(United States) Ezra Armstrong	North Carolina FC	6
10	(United States) Blake Bodily	Tampa Bay Rowdies	6
10	(United States) Taylor Davila	Louisville City FC	6
10	(Uruguay) Enzo Martinez	Birmingham Legion FC	6
10	(United States) Dawson McCartney	Birmingham Legion FC	6
10	(United States) Aiden McFadden	Louisville City FC	6
10	(Scotland) Nick Ross	Sacramento Republic FC	6
10	(Colombia) Juan David Torres	Charleston Battery	6

=== Clean sheets ===
Rank	Player	Club	Clean sheets
1	(United States) Eric Dick	Pittsburgh Riverhounds SC	14
1	(United States) Danny Vitiello	Sacramento Republic FC	14
3	(United States) Jake McGuire	North Carolina FC	12
3	(Argentina) Rocco Ríos Novo	Phoenix Rising FC	12
3	(United States) Colin Shutler	Orange County SC	12
6	(United States) Jordan Farr	Tampa Bay Rowdies	11
7	(France) Hugo Fauroux	Loudoun United FC	10
7	(Mexico) Christian Herrera	Colorado Springs Switchbacks	10
9	(United States) Adam Grinwis	Charleston Battery	9
9	(United States) Damian Las	Louisville City FC	9
9	(United States) Hunter Sulte	Indy Eleven	9

== Average home attendances ==
Ranked from highest to lowest average attendance.

Team	GP	Total	High	Low	Average
Sacramento Republic FC	17	171,808	11,569	8,688	10,106
Indy Eleven	17	166,518	10,780	8,091	9,795
Louisville City FC	17	164,974	13,526	6,197	9,704
New Mexico United	17	159,557	12,147	7,015	9,386
Colorado Springs Switchbacks FC	17	130,288	8,023	6,174	7,664
San Antonio FC	17	113,485	7,546	5,535	6,676
Detroit City FC	17	106,438	7,172	5,155	6,261
Phoenix Rising FC	17	106,349	8,620	4,190	6,256
El Paso Locomotive FC	17	98,830	7,067	4,014	5,814
Pittsburgh Riverhounds SC	17	86,512	6,099	3,109	5,089
Hartford Athletic	17	84,276	5,500	2,969	4,957
Tampa Bay Rowdies	16	78,305	7,500	223	4,894
Rhode Island FC	17	73,210	5,252	3,481	4,306
Orange County SC	17	71,208	5,500	3,018	4,189
Oakland Roots SC	17	68,299	6,408	2,631	4,018
Monterey Bay FC	17	68,189	5,199	3,309	4,011
Birmingham Legion FC	17	62,343	5,147	1,704	3,667
FC Tulsa	17	62,045	5,135	2,573	3,650
Charleston Battery	17	61,959	4,610	2,579	3,645
Memphis 901 FC	17	50,160	4,688	2,188	2,951
Loudoun United FC	17	49,628	4,589	1,525	2,919
North Carolina FC	17	39,436	6,083	1,359	2,320
Las Vegas Lights FC	17	31,675	4,532	1,048	1,864
Miami FC	17	18,268	1,823	563	1,075
Total	424	2,123,760	13,526	223	5,009

== League awards ==
=== Individual awards ===
Award	Winner	Team	Reason	Ref.
Golden Boot	(United States) Nick Markanich	Charleston Battery	Single season record with 28 goals	
Golden Glove	(United States) Eric Dick	Pittsburgh Riverhounds SC	14 shutouts; 0.69 goals against average; 79.1 save percentage	
Golden Playmaker	(United States) Noah Fuson	Rhode Island FC	10 assists	
Goalkeeper of the Year	(United States) Eric Dick	Pittsburgh Riverhounds SC	14 shutouts; 0.69 goals against average; 79.1 save percentage	
Defender of the Year	(United States) Graham Smith	Charleston Battery	159 duels overall at a 72% success rate	
Coach of the Year	(United States) Danny Cruz	Louisville City FC	Led Louisville to the Players' Shield title	
Young Player of the Year	(United States) Elijah Wynder	Louisville City FC	6 goals; 37 tackles won	
Most Valuable Player	(United States) Nick Markanich	Charleston Battery	Scored 30 goals in the regular season and playoffs	
Comeback Player of the Year	(Haiti) Zachary Herivaux	Rhode Island FC	Career best 4 goals and 3 assists.	
Goal of the Year	(United States) Nate Worth	Tampa Bay Rowdies	vs Charleston Battery	
Save of the Year	(Uruguay) Felipe Rodriguez	Miami FC	vs Loudoun United FC	

=== All-league teams ===
First team
Goalkeeper	Defenders	Midfielders	Forwards
(United States) Eric Dick (PGH)	(England) Jack Gurr (SAC) (United States) Matt Mahoney (COS) (Spain) Arturo Ordoñez (LOU) (United States) Graham Smith (CHS)	(United States) Taylor Davila (LOU) (Mexico) Jorge Hernandez (SAN) (Republic of Ireland) Aaron Molloy (CHS) (United States) Maxi Rodriguez (DET)	(United States) Wilson Harris (LOU) (United States) Nick Markanich (CHS)

Second team
Goalkeeper	Defenders	Midfielders	Forwards
(United States) Danny Vitiello (SAC)	(United States) Devon Amoo-Mensah (DET) (United States) Ezra Armstrong (NCA) (Senegal) Pape Mar Boye (PHX) (United States) Sean Totsch (LOU)	(United States) Noah Fuson (RI) (Brazil) Bruno Lapa (MEM) (Cameroon) J.C. Ngando (LVL) (United States) Elijah Wynder (LOU)	(Venezuela) Manuel Arteaga (TBR) (United States) Cal Jennings (TBR)

=== Midseason awards ===
Goalkeeper of the Year		Defender of the Year		Coach of the Year		Young Player of the Year		Player of the Year		References
(United States) Danny Vitiello	Sacramento Republic FC	(United States) Kendall Burks	San Antonio FC	(United States) Danny Cruz	Louisville City FC	(United States) Ray Serrano	Louisville City FC	(United States) Danny Vitiello	Sacramento Republic FC	

=== Monthly awards ===
Month	Player of the Month			Coach of the Month		References
Month	Player	Club	Position	Coach	Club	References
March	(United States) Wilson Harris	Louisville City FC	Forward	(England) Danny Dichio	Detroit City FC	
April	(United States) Nick Markanich	Charleston Battery	Forward	(United States) Ben Pirmann	Charleston Battery	
May	(Brazil) Marlon	Memphis 901 FC	Forward	(England) Sean McAuley	Indy Eleven	
June	(Jamaica) Khori Bennett	Las Vegas Lights FC	Forward	(Turks and Caicos Islands) Gavin Glinton	Oakland Roots SC	
July	(United States) Johan Peñaranda	FC Tulsa	Goalkeeper	(Bermuda) Khano Smith	Rhode Island FC	
August	(United States) Nick Markanich	Charleston Battery	Forward	(United States) Danny Cruz	Louisville City FC	
September	(United States) Colin Shutler	Orange County SC	Goalkeeper	(England) Danny Dichio	Detroit City FC	
October	(United States) JJ Williams	Rhode Island FC	Forward	(England) Danny Stone	Orange County SC	

=== Weekly awards ===
Player of the Week
Week	Player	Club	Position	Reason	Ref.
1	(United States) Trevor Amann	Sacramento Republic FC	Forward	2 goals vs Orange County	
2	(Mexico) Rafael Baca	Monterey Bay FC	Midfielder	GWG goal vs Phoenix	
3	(United States) Allen Gavilanes	Miami FC	Forward	2 goals vs Orange County	
4	(United States) Maxi Rodriguez	Detroit City FC	Midfielder	1 goal; 1 assist vs Indy	
5	(United States) Wilson Harris	Louisville City FC	Forward	Hat trick vs Indy	
6	(United States) Nick Markanich	Charleston Battery	Forward	3 goals; 1 assist in 2 games	
7	(Uganda) Edward Kizza	Pittsburgh Riverhounds SC	Forward	1 goal; 1 assist vs Phoenix	
8	(United States) Nick Markanich	Charleston Battery	Forward	4 goals; 1 assist vs Las Vegas	
9	(Brazil) Marlon	Memphis 901 FC	Forward	2 goals; 1 assist vs Tampa Bay	
10	(United States) Aedan Stanley	Indy Eleven	Defender	2 assists vs Miami	
11	(United States) Forrest Lasso	Tampa Bay Rowdies	Defender	2 goals vs Tulsa	
12	(El Salvador) Amando Moreno	El Paso Locomotive	Forward	2 goals vs Charleston	
13	(Cameroon) Antony Siaha	Monterey Bay FC	Goalkeeper	2 clean sheets; 13 total saves	
14	(Poland) Dariusz Formella	Phoenix Rising FC	Forward	2 goals vs Orange County	
15	(South Africa) Lindo Mfeka	Oakland Roots SC	Midfielder	2 goals vs Sacramento	
16	(United States) Colin Shutler	Orange County SC	Goalkeeper	8 save shutout vs Indy	
17	(United States) MD Myers	Charleston Battery	Forward	Hat trick vs North Carolina	
18	(United States) Nick Markanich	Charleston Battery	Forward	2 goals vs Birmingham	
19	(Republic of the Congo) Junior Etou	Pittsburgh Riverhounds SC	Defender	2 goals vs Oakland	
20	(Haiti) Zachary Herivaux	Rhode Island FC	Midfielder	2 goals vs Birmingham	
21	(Brazil) Stefano Pinho	Birmingham Legion FC	Forward	2 goals vs Orange County	
22	(United States) Kalil ElMedkhar	Loudoun United FC	Forward	2 goals vs Miami	
23	(United States) Wilson Harris	Louisville City FC	Forward	2 goals vs Sacramento	
24	(United States) Harry Swartz	New Mexico United	Forward	2 goals vs Tulsa	
25	(United States) Nick Markanich	Charleston Battery	Forward	Hat trick vs Orange County	
26	(Jamaica) Khori Bennett	Las Vegas Lights FC	Forward	2 goals vs Orange County	
27	(Japan) Yosuke Hanya	Colorado Springs Switchbacks	Midfielder	1 goal; 1 assist vs Tampa Bay	
28	(Brazil) Renan Ribeiro	Hartford Athletic	Goalkeeper	10 saves; 2 shutouts	
29	(United States) Nick Markanich	Charleston Battery	Forward	Set single season scoring record	
30	(Sierra Leone) Augustine Williams	Indy Eleven	Forward	Hat trick vs Miami	
31	(France) Bertin Jacquesson	Pittsburgh Riverhounds SC	Forward	Hat trick vs Miami	
32	(United States) Danny Barrera	Hartford Athletic	Midfielder	2 goals; 1 assist vs North Carolina	
33	(United States) Johnny Rodriguez	Oakland Roots SC	Forward	2 goals vs Las Vegas	
34	(United States) JJ Williams	Rhode Island FC	Forward	Hat trick vs Miami	

Goal of the Week
Week	Player	Club	Opponent	Ref.
1	(United States) Nighte Pickering	Memphis 901 FC	Las Vegas Lights FC	
2	(United States) Phillip Goodrum	FC Tulsa	Las Vegas Lights FC	
3	(United States) Allen Gavilanes	Miami FC	Orange County SC	
4	(United States) Carter Manley	San Antonio FC	Monterey Bay FC	
5	(Egypt) Abdellatif Aboukoura	Loudoun United FC	Birmingham Legion FC	
6	(United States) Tristan Trager	Monterey Bay FC	Las Vegas Lights FC	
7	(Colombia) Juan David Torres	Charleston Battery	FC Tulsa	
8	(United States) Elijah Wynder	Louisville City FC	Hartford Athletic	
9	(United States) Nick Markanich	Charleston Battery	Hartford Athletic	
10	(England) Ben Morris	Detroit City FC	Phoenix Rising FC	
11	(United States) Taylor Davila	Louisville City FC	Las Vegas Lights FC	
12	(Scotland) Greg Hurst	New Mexico United	San Antonio FC	
13	(United States) Robby Dambrot	Loudoun United FC	FC Tulsa	
14	(Mexico) Jorge Hernandez	San Antonio FC	FC Tulsa	
15	(Australia) Panos Armenakas	Phoenix Rising FC	El Paso Locomotive FC	
16	(Brazil) Bruno Lapa	Memphis 901 FC	Las Vegas Lights FC	
17	(United States) Ray Serrano	Louisville City FC	Birmingham Legion FC	
18	(United States) Wesley Leggett	Loudoun United FC	Hartford Athletic	
19	(Brazil) Bruno Lapa	Memphis 901 FC	Detroit City FC	
20	(United States) Phillip Goodrum	FC Tulsa	Memphis 901 FC	
21	(United States) Nate Worth	Tampa Bay Rowdies	Charleston Battery	
22	(Colombia) Edwin Laszo	FC Tulsa	San Antonio FC	
23	(England) Ben Morris	Detroit City FC	Las Vegas Lights FC	
24	(United States) Mukwelle Akale	New Mexico United	Monterey Bay FC	
25	(Australia) Panos Armenakas	Memphis 901 FC	Oakland Roots SC	
26	(United States) Danny Griffin	Pittsburgh Riverhounds SC	Indy Eleven	
27	(United States) Bradley Sample	Pittsburgh Riverhounds SC	Rhode Island FC	
28	(France) Florian Valot	Loudoun United FC	Birmingham Legion FC	
29	(Venezuela) Darwin Matheus	Birmingham Legion FC	Miami FC	
30	(Brazil) Stefano Pinho	Birmingham Legion FC	Pittsburgh Riverhounds SC	
31	(Ivory Coast) Laurent Kissiedou	Detroit City FC	Charleston Battery	
32	(United States) Xavi Gnaulati	Monterey Bay FC	Sacramento Republic FC	
33	(Canada) Rida Zouhir	Birmingham Legion FC	Indy Eleven	
34	(England) Ryan Williams	Detroit City FC	San Antonio FC	

Save of the Week
Week	Goalkeeper	Club	Opponent	Ref.
1	(Jamaica) Jahmali Waite	El Paso Locomotive	Hartford Athletic	
2	(United States) Antonio Carrera	North Carolina FC	Loudoun United FC	
3	(United States) Javier Garcia	El Paso Locomotive	Las Vegas Lights FC	
4	(United States) Danny Vitiello	Sacramento Republic FC	Memphis 901 FC	
5	(United States) Danny Vitiello	Sacramento Republic FC	Colorado Springs Switchbacks	
6	(Suriname) Joey Roggeveen	FC Tulsa	Sacramento Republic FC	
7	(Jamaica) Jahmali Waite	El Paso Locomotive	Tampa Bay Rowdies	
8	(United States) Jordan Farr	Tampa Bay Rowdies	New Mexico United	
9	(United States) Daniel Gagliardi	Miami FC	Pittsburgh Riverhounds SC	
10	(Paraguay) Gabriel Perrotta	Pittsburgh Riverhounds SC	FC Tulsa	
11	(France) Hugo Fauroux	Loudoun United FC	Monterey Bay FC	
12	(United States) Danny Vitiello	Sacramento Republic FC	Birmingham Legion FC	
13	(United States) Danny Vitiello	Sacramento Republic FC	Tampa Bay Rowdies	
14	(United States) Danny Vitiello	Sacramento Republic FC	Monterey Bay FC	
15	(United States) Hunter Sulte	Indy Eleven	San Antonio FC	
16	(Uruguay) Felipe Rodriguez	Miami FC	Loudoun United FC	
17	(United States) Danny Vitiello	Sacramento Republic FC	Hartford Athletic	
18	(Mexico) Pablo Sisniega	San Antonio FC	Phoenix Rising FC	
19	(United States) Hunter Sulte	Indy Eleven	Loudoun United FC	
20	(Jamaica) Jahmali Waite	El Paso Locomotive	Phoenix Rising FC	
21	(Jamaica) Jahmali Waite	El Paso Locomotive	New Mexico United	
22	(Jamaica) Jahmali Waite	El Paso Locomotive	Memphis 901 FC	
23	(United States) Hunter Sulte	Indy Eleven	New Mexico United	
24	(Jamaica) Jahmali Waite	El Paso Locomotive	Orange County SC	
25	(United States) Jake McGuire	North Carolina FC	Phoenix Rising FC	
26	(United States) Brandon Gongora	San Antonio FC	Charleston Battery	
27	(France) Hugo Fauroux	Loudoun United FC	Louisville City FC	
28	(Jamaica) Jahmali Waite	El Paso Locomotive	Indy Eleven	
29	(France) Hugo Fauroux	Loudoun United FC	New Mexico United	
30	(United States) Danny Vitiello	Sacramento Republic FC	New Mexico United	
31	(United States) Hunter Sulte	Indy Eleven	Louisville City FC	
32	(Mexico) Pablo Sisniega	San Antonio FC	El Paso Locomotive FC	
33	(United States) Danny Vitiello	Sacramento Republic FC	El Paso Locomotive FC	
34	(United States) Johan Peñaranda	FC Tulsa	Monterey Bay FC	

Team of the Week
Week	Goalkeeper	Defenders	Midfielders	Forwards	Bench	Coach	Ref.
**1**	(United States) Van Oekel (BHM)	(Puerto Rico) Cardona (MIA) (United States) Stauffer (ELP) (Morocco) Boudadi (IND)	(Mexico) Hernandez (SAN) (France) Valot (LDN) (Scotland) Blake (IND) (Burundi) Donasiyano (OAK)	(United States) **Amann** (SAC) (Scotland) Hurst (NMU) (Jamaica) Williams (HFD)	(Jamaica) Booth (MIA) (Ecuador) Cedeno (OAK) (Republic of Ireland) Molloy (CHS) (United States) Pickering (MEM) (El Salvador) Tamacas (OAK) (Greece) Tambakis (NMU) (United States) O'Connor-Ward (MEM)	(United States) Eric Quill (NMU)	
**2**	(United States) Shutler (OCO)	(United States) Mahoney (COS) (United States) Stanley (IND) (United States) Totsch (LOU)	(United States) Ferri (TUL) (Mexico) **Baca** (MB) (Scotland) Blake (IND) (United States) ElMedkhar (LDN) (United States) Holstad (RI)	(United States) Ryan (LDN) (United States) Goodrum (TUL)	(United States) Diaz (OAK) (Norway) Doghman (OCO) (Burundi) Donasiyano (OAK) (England) Gurr (SAC) (Republic of Ireland) Molloy (CHS) (Cameroon) Siaha (MB) (Germany) Yosef (TUL)	(Canada) Frank Yallop (MB)	
**3**	(United States) Walters (HFD)	(Canada) Dossantos (CHS) (United States) Totsch (LOU) (Mexico) Guzmán (MB)	(United States) Serrano (LOU) (Republic of Ireland) Molloy (CHS) (Ghana) Asiedu (HFD) (Brazil) Silva (SAN)	(United States) **Gavilanes** (MIA) (Cameroon) Dikwa (RI) (United States) Markanich (CHS)	(Ghana) Amoh (DET) (Republic of Ireland) Carroll (DET) (El Salvador) Martinez (MB) (United States) Myers (CHS) (Cameroon) Ngando (LVL) (Mexico) Sisniega (SAN) (France) Valot (LDN)	(Canada) Alen Marcina (SAN)	
**4**	(United States) Steinwascher (DET)	(United States) Smart (LVL) (United States) Taintor (SAN) (Republic of Ireland) Doherty (TBR)	(United States) Serrano (LOU) (France) Noël (LVL) (United States) Davila (LOU) (United States) **Rodriguez** (DET)	(Ivory Coast) Samake (LVL) (United States) Harris (LOU) (United States) Markanich (CHS)	(United States) Astorga (NMU) (Scotland) Coote (DET) (Mexico) Guillén (TBR) (Mexico) Hernandez (SAN) (United States) López (SAC) (Argentina) Novo (PHX) (France) L. Perez (NCA)	(United States) Danny Cruz (LOU)	
**5**	(Australia) Lee (RI)	(United States) Smart (LVL) (Comoros) Souahy (TUL) (Montenegro) Klimenta (LVL)	(Colombia) Laszo (TUL) (Scotland) Blake (IND) (United States) Portillo (TUL) (United States) Wilson (LOU)	(United States) Cicerone (SAC) (United States) **Harris** (LOU) (United States) Serrano (LOU)	(Jamaica) Beckford (HFD) (France) Cabral (PHX) (Republic of Ireland) Desmond (SAC) (United States) Dick (PIT) (Trinidad and Tobago) Hodge (HFD) (Italy) Micaletto (NMU) (United States) A. Perez (LOU)	(United States) Dennis Sanchez (LVL)	
**6**	(Australia) Lee (RI)	(Mexico) Guzmán (MB) (Sweden) Stenberg (PHX) (Canada) Awuah (LDN)	(United States) Bodily (TBR) (United States) López (SAC) (France) Valot (LDN) (United States) Ycaza (CHS)	(United States) Rodriguez (OAK) (United States) Jennings (TBR) (United States) **Markanich** (CHS)	(United States) Armstrong (NCA) (United States) Diaz (OAK) (United States) Ferree (OCO) (Northern Ireland) Logue (OAK) (United States) Myers (CHS) (El Salvador) J. Pérez (TBR) (United States) Seagrist (TUL)	(United States) Ben Pirmann (CHS)	
**7**	(Jamaica) Waite (ELP)	(United States) Totsch (LOU) (United States) Lasso (TBR) (United States) Turnbull (RI)	(Mexico) Hernandez (SAN) (United States) Crisostomo (TBR) (Republic of Ireland) Molloy (CHS) (United States) Enríquez (MB)	(Scotland) Hurst (NMU) (United States) Myers (CHS) (Uganda) **Kizza** (PIT)	(United States) Faundez (LOU) (England) Gurr (SAC) (United States) Hernandez-Foster (BHM) (Canada) Levis (DET) (United States) Markanich (CHS) (England) B. Morris (DET) (Mexico) Nevárez (ELP)	(Bermuda) Khano Smith (RI)	
**8**	(United States) Shutler (OCO)	(United States) Segbers (CHS) (United States) Hogan (PIT) (United States) Chattha (OCO)	(United States) J. Morris (LOU) (Republic of Ireland) Molloy (CHS) (United States) Ycaza (CHS) (Brazil) Lapa (MEM)	(United States) **Markanich** (CHS) (United States) Jennings (TBR) (England) Phillips (SAC)	(Venezuela) Arteaga (TBR) (England) Chapman-Page (IND) (Argentina) Cuello (PHX) (United States) Deric (MEM) (Jamaica) Foster (COS) (United States) Griffin (PIT) (Brazil) Turci (MEM)	(Republic of Ireland) James Chambers (COS)	
**9**	(United States) Steinwascher (DET)	(Republic of the Congo) Etou (PIT) (United States) Mahoney (COS) (Somalia) Mohamed (NMU)	(Mexico) Hernandez (SAN) (Scotland) Blake (IND) (England) Allan (CHS) (Uruguay) Martinez (BHM)	(Brazil) **Marlon** (MEM) (Haiti) Damus (COS) (England) Bruce (NMU)	(United States) Borczak (MEM) (Cuba) Diz Pe (IND) (United States) Goodrum (TUL) (United States) Grinwis (CHS) (Guinea-Bissau) Nogueira (SAN) (Canada) Pasher (BHM) (Brazil) Pinho (BHM)	(Scotland) Stephen Glass (MEM)	
**10**	(United States) Deric (MEM)	(United States) **Stanley** (IND) (Mexico) Guzmán (MB) (Cuba) Diz Pe (IND)	(El Salvador) Calvillo (ELP) (United States) Davila (LOU) (Nigeria) Akinyode (ELP) (Brazil) Lapa (MEM)	(South Africa) Moshobane (ELP) (Sierra Leone) A. Williams (IND) (United States) Serrano (LOU)	(Japan) Hanya (COS) (United States) Holstad (RI) (Uruguay) Martinez (BHM) (England) B. Morris (DET) (United States) Trager (MB) (Brazil) Turci (MEM) (Jamaica) Waite (ELP)	(United States) Danny Cruz (LOU)	
**11**	(United States) Grinwis (CHS)	(United States) Stanley (IND) (United States) **Lasso** (TBR) (England) Craig (NCA)	(United States) Armstrong (NCA) (United States) Davila (LOU) (England) Dennis (TBR) (New Zealand) Bidois (LDN)	(Venezuela) Arteaga (TBR) (Haiti) Damus (COS) (United States) Jennings (TBR)	(Morocco) Boudadi (IND) (Argentina) Novo (PHX) (United States) Ofeimu (IND) (Jamaica) Reid (OAK) (Brazil) Marlon (MEM) (United States) Segbers (CHS) (Argentina) Varela (PHX)	(Scotland) Robbie Neilson (TBR)	
**12**	(Spain) Vegas (RI)	(United States) Stauffer (ELP) (United States) Jimenez (MEM) (Somalia) Mohamed (NMU)	(United States) Maldonado (NCA) (Scotland) Blake (IND) (French Guiana) Vancaeyezeele (HFD) (France) Valot (LDN)	(El Salvador) **Moreno** (ELP) (United States) Ryan (LDN) (United States) Jennings (TBR)	(United States) Armstrong (NCA) (United States) Blanchette (OAK) (England) Craig (NCA) (Scotland) Hurst (NMU) (Ivory Coast) Landry (NMU) (Brazil) Marlon (MEM) (Grenada) Paterson (BHM)	(United States) Ryan Martin (LDN)	
**13**	(Cameroon) **Siaha** (MB)	(United States) Ofeimu (IND) (Haiti) Pierre (COS) (Grenada) Paterson (BHM) (Trinidad and Tobago) Hodge (HFD)	(France) Valot (LDN) (United States) J. Morris (LOU) (United States) Scott (OCO)	(Canada) Pasher (BHM) (United States) Harris (LOU) (England) Dennis (TBR)	(Cameroon) Amang (OCO) (United States) Dambrot (LDN) (Republic of Ireland) Doyle (RI) (Republic of Ireland) Molloy (CHS) (Argentina) Novo (PHX) (United States) Smart (LVL) (United States) Wynder (LOU)	(Scotland) Robbie Neilson (TBR)	
**14**	(United States) Vitiello (SAC)	(United States) Diaz (OAK) (United States) Totsch (LOU) (United States) Damm (TUL)	(Portugal) Pacheco (TUL) (France) Noël (LVL) (United States) Rodriguez (DET) (Mexico) Hernandez (SAN)	(England) B. Morris (DET) (Poland) **Formella** (PHX) (Jamaica) Bennett (LVL)	(Ecuador) Cedeño (OAK) (United States) Gloster (NMU) (United States) McFadden (LOU) (United States) Nigro (LVL) (England) Phillips (SAC) (United States) Syrel (OAK) (United States) Vom Steeg (MEM)	(United States) Dennis Sanchez (LVL)	
**15**	(United States) Sulte (IND)	(Trinidad and Tobago) Hodge (HFD) (United States) Batista (NCA) (United States) O'Connor-Ward (MEM)	(Japan) Hanya (COS) (Brazil) Mentzingen (NCA) (South Africa) **Mfeka** (OAK) (Burundi) Niyongabire (TBR)	(United States) Jamison (OCO) (Democratic Republic of the Congo) Ngalina (HFD) (Jamaica) Foster (COS)	(United States) Amann (SAC) (Republic of Ireland) Carroll (DET) (United States) Farrell (HFD) (Scotland) Hurst (NMU) (Brazil) Lapa (MEM) (Brazil) Ribeiro (HFD) (United States) Rodriguez (DET)	(Turks and Caicos Islands) Gavin Glinton (OAK)	
**16**	(United States) **Shutler** (OCO)	(United States) Turnbull (RI) (United States) Enríquez (MB) (Rwanda) Kwizera (RI)	(El Salvador) Martinez (MB) (United States) McCartney (BHM) (Egypt) Aboukoura (LDN) (Burundi) Niyongabire (TBR)	(Canada) Pasher (BHM) (Jamaica) Bennett (LVL) (United States) Goodrum (TUL)	(United States) Brito (RI) (Republic of Ireland) Crognale (BHM) (Australia) Duncan (MEM) (Cuba) López (MIA) (United States) Maples (NMU) (Greece) Tambakis (NMU) (United States) Zubak (OCO)	(Bermuda) Khano Smith (RI)	
**17**	(France) Fauroux (LDN)	(United States) O'Connor-Ward (MEM) (United States) Bryant (DET) (United States) Vom Steeg (MEM)	(Rwanda) Kwizera (RI) (Cameroon) Ngando (LVL) (Australia) Duncan (MEM) (Egypt) Aboukoura (LDN)	(Jamaica) Bennett (LVL) (United States) **Myers** (CHB) (United States) Harris (LOU)	(United States) Agudelo (SAN) (Cuba) Arozarena (LVL) (United States) Markanich (CHS) (Somalia) Mohamed (NMU) (United States) Riley (OAK) (United States) Rodriguez (DET) (England) R. Williams (DET)	(United States) Ryan Martin (LDN)	
**18**	(Mexico) Herrera (MB)	(United States) Lambe (OCO) (Cuba) Nodarse (RI) (United States) Amoo-Mensah (DET)	(Brazil) Mentzingen (NCA) (United States) Scott (OCO) (United States) Ybarra (RI) (Italy) Micaletto (NMU)	(United States) **Markanich** (CHS) (United States) Conway (NCA) (United States) Leggett (LDN)	(United States) Agudelo (SAN) (England) Allan (CHS) (Cuba) Arozarena (LVL) (United States) Diaz (OAK) (Mexico) Hernandez (SAN) (United States) Ryan (LDN) (United States) Santos (COS)	(United States) Dennis Sanchez (LVL)	
**19**	(United States) Peñaranda (TUL)	(Republic of the Congo) **Etou** (PIT) (Republic of Ireland) Doherty (TBR) (United States) Suber (PIT) (United States) Dodson (BHM)	(Republic of Ireland) Molloy (CHS) (United States) Sample (PIT) (Brazil) Lapa (MEM)	(United States) Jennings (TBR) (Cameroon) Dikwa (RI) (Democratic Republic of the Congo) Ngalina (HFD)	(Cuba) Arozarena (LVL) (United States) Gannon (LVL) (United States) Leggett (LDN) (United States) Markanich (CHS) (United States) Mertz (PIT) (United States) Ofeimu (IND) (United States) Smart (LVL)	(United States) Bob Lilley (PIT)	
**20**	(United States) Gomez (OCO)	(United States) Segbers (CHS) (Senegal) Boye (PHX) (United States) Lambe (OCO)	(Scotland) Ross (SAC) (Haiti) **Herivaux** (RI) (United States) Davila (LOU) (England) Hilton (TBR)	(United States) Markanich (CHS) (England) Phillips (SAC) (United States) Rodriguez (OAK)	(United States) Fuson (RI) (Uganda) Kizza (PIT) (Greece) Tambakis (NMU) (United States) Timmer (SAC) (United States) Totsch (LOU) (United States) Turnbull (RI) (Venezuela) Zambrano (PHX)	(England) Mark Briggs (SAC)	
**21**	(Canada) Henry (MEM)	(Somalia) Mohamed (NMU) (Cuba) Nodarse (RI) (United States) Smart (LVL)	(Republic of Ireland) Molloy (CHS) (United States) Felipe (SAC) (Argentina) Careaga (MEM) (United States) McFadden (LOU)	(Brazil) **Pinho** (BHM) (Scotland) Hurst (NMU) (United States) Rodriguez (OAK)	(England) Bruce (NMU) (Canada) Pasher (BHM) (Sierra Leone) Samadia (HFD) (United States) Timmer (SAC) (United States) Van Oekel (BHM) (United States) Worth (TBR) (United States) Zandi (COS)	(United States) Tom Soehn (BHM)	
**22**	(Jamaica) Waite (ELP)	(United States) Real (COS) (Senegal) Malou (NCA) (United States) Dambrot (LDN)	(Colombia) Torres (CHS) (Colombia) Laszo (TUL) (United States) Ycaza (CHS) (France) Noël (LVL)	(United States) **ElMedkhar** (LDN) (United States) Markanich (CHS) (United States) Trager (MB)	(United States) Batista (NCA) (United States) Crisostomo (TBR) (United States) Dick (PIT) (United States) Goodrum (TUL) (United States) Holstad (RI) (United States) Mahoney (COS) (United States) Wilson (LOU)	(United States) Mario Sanchez (TUL)	
**23**	(United States) Farr (TBR)	(United States) Stauffer (ELP) (Georgia (country)) Margvelashvili (OAK) (United States) Hogan (PIT)	(Colombia) Torres (CHS) (United States) Coronado (ELP) (Scotland) Ross (SAC) (Mexico) Rivas (NMU)	(Saint Vincent and the Grenadines) Anderson (NCA) (United States) **Harris** (LOU) (United States) Markanich (CHS)	(United States) Davila (LOU) (United States) Dick (PIT) (England) Gurr (SAC) (United States) Maldonado (NCA) (El Salvador) Moreno (ELP) (Cuba) Nodarse (RI) (Scotland) St Clair (TUL)	(United States) John Bradford (NCA)	
**24**	(France) Fauroux (LDN)	(United States) Dambrot (LDN) (United States) Timmer (SAC) (Sierra Leone) Samadia (HFD)	(United States) Quezada (MEM) (Scotland) Ross (SAC) (United States) Akale (NMU) (United States) Davila (LOU)	(United States) **Swartz** (NMU) (Democratic Republic of the Congo) Ngalina (HFD) (United States) Wilson (LOU)	(Cuba) Arozarena (LVL) (El Salvador) Calvillo (ELP) (Argentina) Careaga (MEM) (Senegal) Dieng (HFD) (Brazil) Lapa (MEM) (Canada) Levis (DET) (United States) Suber (PIT)	(United States) Danny Cruz (LOU)	
**25**	(Spain) Vegas (RI)	(Sierra Leone) Samadia (HFD) (Comoros) Souahy (TUL) (United States) Biasi (PIT)	(United States) Pinzón (LVL) (Colombia) Laszo (TUL) (France) Noël (LVL) (Scotland) Blake (IND)	(United States) **Markanich** (CHS) (Uganda) Kizza (PIT) (Senegal) Dieng (HFD)	(United States) Akale (NMU) (Venezuela) Arteaga (TBR) (United States) Dick (PIT) (England) B. Morris (DET) (United States) Myers (CHS) (United States) Timmer (SAC) (United States) O'Connor-Ward (MEM)	(United States) Bob Lilley (PIT)	
**26**	(Argentina) Novo (PHX)	(Haiti) Lacroix (COS) (Puerto Rico) Cardona (MIA) (United States) Real (COS)	(United States) Armstrong (NCA) (Norway) Fjeldberg (COS) (United States) Turnbull (RI) (United States) Diaz (OAK)	(Jamaica) **Bennett** (LVL) (United States) Zubak (OCO) (United States) Wilson (LOU)	(Saint Vincent and the Grenadines) Anderson (NCA) (United States) Harris (LOU) (Senegal) Ndiaye (MIA) (Cameroon) Ngando (LVL) (United States) Ofeimu (IND) (Ghana) Osumanu (PIT) (Jamaica) S. Williams (COS)	(Republic of Ireland) James Chambers (COS)	
**27**	(Mexico) Pasquel (ELP)	(Colombia) Rovira (PIT) (England) Craig (NCA) (United States) Grey (SAN)	(Brazil) Mentzingen (NCA) (Japan) **Hanya** (COS) (United States) Sample (PIT) (United States) Armstrong (NCA)	(United States) Conway (NCA) (United States) Dhillon (COS) (Brazil) da Costa (NCA)	(Cuba) Diz Pe (IND) (Canada) Dossantos (CHS) (United States) Markanich (CHS) (United States) McFadden (LOU) (Senegal) Ndiaye (MIA) (Argentina) Solignac (SAN) (United States) Ycaza (CHS)	(United States) Ben Pirmann (CHS)	
**28**	(Brazil) **Ribeiro** (HFD)	(France) Leerman (LDN) (United States) Totsch (LOU) (United States) Farrell (HFD)	(England) Gurr (SAC) (France) Valot (LDN) (Scotland) Blake (IND) (Canada) Johnston (LDN)	(Brazil) Marlon (MEM) (Senegal) Dieng (HFD) (United States) Ryan (LDN)	(United States) Amoo-Mensah (DET) (Jamaica) Foster (IND) (United States) Hyndman (MEM) (United States) Jimenez (MEM) (United States) Rodriguez (DET) (United States) Shutler (OCO) (Jamaica) Ro. Williams (IND)	(United States) Ryan Martin (LDN)	
**29**	(United States) Shakes (NMU)	(Mexico) Guzmán (MB) (Senegal) Boye (PHX) (United States) Totsch (LOU)	(United States) Smart (LVL) (England) Dennis (PHX) (United States) Rodriguez (DET) (England) Allan (CHS)	(Scotland) Hurst (NMU) (United States) **Markanich** (CHS) (United States) Fuson (RI)	(United States) Akale (NMU) (Poland) Formella (PHX) (Rwanda) Kwizera (RI) (United States) Martin (NCA) (Somalia) Mohamed (NMU) (Norway) Nakkim (OCO) (United States) Shutler (OCO)	(United States) Eric Quill (NMU)	
**30**	(France) Fauroux (LDN)	(United States) Holstad (RI) (Mexico) Ortiz (ELP) (Rwanda) Kwizera (RI)	(Brazil) Lapa (MEM) (United States) Davila (LOU) (United States) Felipe (SAC) (Cameroon) Ngando (LVL)	(Sierra Leone) **A. Williams** (IND) (United States) Zubak (OCO) (Cameroon) Dikwa (RI)	(Scotland) Blake (IND) (United States) Harris (LOU) (United States) Rodriguez (DET) (United States) Rutz (DET) (United States) Vitiello (SAC) (United States) Wynder (LOU) (Canada) Zouhir (BHM)	(England) Mark Briggs (SAC)	
**31**	(Paraguay) Perrotta (PIT)	(United States) Tingey (LDN) (United States) Manley (SAN) (United States) Riley (OAK)	(Brazil) Mentzingen (NCA) (Canada) Zouhir (BHM) (United States) Davila (LOU) (United States) Armstrong (NCA)	(France) **Jacquesson** (PIT) (United States) J. Williams (RI) (Sierra Leone) A. Williams (IND)	(Mexico) Alfaro (ELP) (United States) Dia (LOU) (United States) Fuson (RI) (Mexico) Herrera (MB) (Colombia) Torres (CHS) (United States) Villanueva (DET) (United States) Wynder (LOU)	(England) Jordan Stewart (MB)	
**32**	(Mexico) Sisniega (SAN)	(United States) Doody (LVL) (United States) Ofeimu (IND) (United States) Erlandson (LDN)	(United States) **Barrera** (HFD) (United States) Dia (LOU) (United States) Hairston (HFD) (United States) Gannon (LVL)	(Argentina) Solignac (SAN) (United States) Conway (NCA) (United States) Zubak (OCO)	(United States) Buckmaster (SAN) (United States) Casiple (OCO) (Brazil) da Costa (NCA) (United States) Gyau (LVL) (United States) Maldonado (NCA) (United States) Smart (LVL) (United States) Sulte (IND)	(Spain) Diego Gómez (PHX)	
**33**	(United States) Shutler (OCO)	(Sierra Leone) Samadia (HFD) (Mexico) Alfaro (ELP) (United States) Blackstock (PIT)	(United States) Rh. Williams (DET) (United States) Zandi (COS) (Canada) Zouhir (BHM) (Scotland) Blake (IND) (United States) Stauffer (ELP)	(United States) **Rodriguez** (OAK) (France) Jacquesson (PIT)	(United States) Barrera (HFD) (United States) Batista (NCA) (United States) Borczak (MEM) (United States) Casiple (OCO) (United States) Dick (PIT) (Norway) Doghman (OCO) (Colombia) Sinisterra (OAK)	(Turks and Caicos Islands) Gavin Glinton (OAK)	
**34**	(United States) Dick (PIT)	(Norway) Doghman (OCO) (New Zealand) Adams (LOU) (Scotland) St Clair (TUL)	(Brazil) Lapa (MEM) (Haiti) Herivaux (RI) (United States) Crisostomo (TBR) (United States) Mertz (PIT)	(United States) **J. Williams** (RI) (United States) Harris (LOU) (Cameroon) Preston (BHM)	(Jamaica) Booth (TUL) (England) Craig (NCA) (United States) Fuson (RI) (United States) Hernandez-Foster (BHM) (Mexico) Herrera (COS) (Rwanda) Kwizera (RI) (England) B. Morris (DET)	(Republic of Ireland) James Chambers (COS)	
**Bold** denotes Player of the Week
