= Isaac Zuleta =

Colombian footballer (born 2003)

Personal information
- Full name: Isaac Zuleta Rendón
- Date of birth: 10 August 2003 (age 23)
- Place of birth: Los Angeles, California, U.S.
- Height: 1.81 m (5 ft 11 in)
- Position: Forward

Youth career
- Envigado
- 2017–2022: Getafe

Senior career*
| Years | Team | Apps | (Gls) |
| 2022–2023 | Getafe B | 4 | (0) |
| 2023 | New Mexico United | 0 | (0) |
| 2024 | Miami FC | 0 | (0) |

International career^{‡}
| 2021– | Colombia U20 | 10 | (1) |
- * Club domestic league appearances and goals as of 18:50, 31 October 2024 (UTC) ‡ National team caps and goals as of 21:36, 5 July 2023 (UTC)

Isaac Zuleta Rendón (born 10 August 2003) is a professional footballer who currently plays as a forward. Born in the United States, he is a youth international for Colombia.

== Early life ==
The son of a construction businessman, Zuleta was born in Los Angeles, California in the United States, but moved to Medellín, Colombia immediately after his birth.

== Club career ==
After his family moved to Envigado, Zuleta joined the academy of Envigado, where he spent "two or three years" before his family moved again, to Getafe in Spain when he was fourteen. He went on trial with local professional side Getafe, who invited him to join after two months of trials. He scored hat-tricks in his first three games, for a total of sixteen goals in his first eleven matches, at youth level. After a while in the academy, he was offered a professional contract by Italian side Venezia, but decided to remain with Getafe, signing his first professional deal in December 2021.

== International career ==
In late 2021, Zuleta was called up to the Colombian under-20 side for the Revelations Cup, as Colombia lost 3–2 to Brazil in the final. He featured for Colombia at the 2023 South American U-20 Championship, but did not impress with no goals in five games as Colombia third in the tournament.

Following manager Héctor Cárdenas' decision to call up Zuleta to his preliminary squad for the 2023 FIFA U-20 World Cup, ahead of both Tomás Ángel and Luis Quintero, who had both had better seasons than Zuleta, speculation in Colombia arose that vice president of the Colombian Football Federation, Álvaro González Alzate, had imposed his influence on the squad selection in order to ensure Zuleta was called up. Both Cárdenas and González Alzate denied this, with the latter stating in an interview with Noticias RCN in January 2023 that he "[doesn't] even know" Zuleta.

Following the controversial call up, Zuleta announced via his Instagram account on 4 May 2023 that he would be withdrawing from the squad, citing his recovery from injury as the reason.

== Career statistics ==
=== Club ===
As of 31 October 2024

Appearances and goals by club, season and competition
| Club | Season | League | | | Cup | | Other | | Total | |
| Club | Season | Division | Apps | Goals | Apps | Goals | Apps | Goals | Apps | Goals |
|---|---|---|---|---|---|---|---|---|---|---|
| Getafe B | 2022–23 | Tercera Federación | 4 | 0 | 0 | 0 | 0 | 0 | 4 | 0 |
| New Mexico United | 2023 | USL Championship | 0 | 0 | 0 | 0 | 0 | 0 | 0 | 0 |
| Miami FC | 2024 | USL Championship | 0 | 0 | 0 | 0 | 0 | 0 | 0 | 0 |
| Career total | | | 4 | 0 | 0 | 0 | 0 | 0 | 4 | 0 |
