= Roberto Molina (footballer, born 2001) =

Salvadoran footballer (born 2001)

Personal information
- Full name: Roberto Molina
- Date of birth: 28 January 2001 (age 25)
- Place of birth: Sonsonate, El Salvador
- Height: 1.76 m (5 ft 9 in)
- Position: Winger

Youth career
- 2017–2019: Barca Residency Academy

College career
Years	Team	Apps	(Gls)
2019–2020	UC Irvine Anteaters	19	(3)

Senior career*
Years	Team	Apps	(Gls)
2021–2022	Las Vegas Lights	44	(3)
2023–2024	Indy Eleven	17	(3)
2024	Miami FC	26	(1)
2025	Orange County SC	9	(0)

International career^{‡}
2021–	El Salvador	6	(0)
- * Club domestic league appearances and goals as of 16:00, 30 October 2025 (UTC) ‡ National team caps and goals as of 16:41, 13 March 2024 (UTC)

Roberto Molina (born 28 January 2001) is a Salvadoran professional footballer who plays as a winger for the El Salvador national team.

== Career ==
=== Youth ===
Molina played with the USSDA Barca Residency academy for 3 years prior to attending college.

=== College ===
In 2019, Molina attended the University of California, Irvine to play college soccer. In his freshman season, Molina made 19 appearances, scoring 3 goals and tallying 3 assists for the Anteaters. There was no 2020 season in the Big West Conference due to the COVID-19 pandemic.

=== Professional ===
On 5 April 2021, Molina was announced as a signing for USL Championship side Las Vegas Lights, opting to pursue a professional career and leaving college early. Molina made his professional debut on 5 May 2021, starting in a 5–0 loss to LA Galaxy II.

On January 11, 2022, Molina was selected 45th overall in the 2022 MLS SuperDraft by Colorado Rapids.

On May 18, 2023, Molina signed with USL Championship club Indy Eleven. The club announced that Molina would return for the 2024 USL Championship season on January 12, 2024.

Molina was transferred to USL Championship club Miami FC as part of a swap deal on April 11, 2024.

== Personal ==
Molina was born in El Salvador, and raised in both Sonsonate and North Hollywood, California.
