= Alejandro Mitrano =

Venezuelan footballer (born 1998)

Personal information
- Full name: Alejandro Mitrano Heidenreich
- Date of birth: 4 April 1998 (age 28)
- Place of birth: Maracaibo, Venezuela
- Height: 1.81 m (5 ft 11 in)
- Position: Left-back

Team information
- Current team: Indy Eleven
- Number: 29

Youth career
- Kendall SC
- New York Cosmos
- –2017: Manacor

Senior career*
| Years | Team | Apps | (Gls) |
| 2017–2019 | Slavia Prague B | | |
| 2019 | Zemplín Michalovce | 2 | (0) |
| 2020 | Deportivo Petare | | |
| 2020 | → Boston River (loan) | 0 | (0) |
| 2022 | Monagas | 3 | (0) |
| 2023 | Las Vegas Lights | 26 | (0) |
| 2024–2025 | Miami FC | 51 | (0) |
| 2026– | Indy Eleven | 21 | (0) |
- * Club domestic league appearances and goals as of 19:16, 7 November 2026 (UTC)

Alejandro Mitrano Heidenreich (born 4 April 1998) is a Venezuelan professional footballer who plays for USL Championship club Indy Eleven as a left back.

== Club career ==
=== Zemplín Michalovce ===
Mitrano made his professional Fortuna Liga debut for Zemplín Michalovce against iClinic Sereď on 4 May 2019. He was featured directly in the starting-XI of the 2:2 tie. He also played the second half of the following fixture against Ružomberok, replacing José Carrillo. Ružomberok won 3:0.

=== Deportivo Petare ===
On 18 February 2020 it was confirmed, that Mitrano had joined Deportivo Petare. He was immediately loaned out to Uruguayan club Boston River for the 2020 season.

=== Las Vegas Lights ===
Mitrano was announced as a new signing for USL Championship side Las Vegas Lights on 25 January 2023.
