= Khadim Ndiaye =

Senegalese soccer player

Personal information
- Date of birth: April 12, 2000 (age 26)
- Place of birth: Dakar, Senegal
- Height: 6 ft 7 in (2.01 m)
- Position: Goalkeeper

Team information
- Current team: Miami FC
- Number: 1

Youth career
- 2018–2020: Atalanta

Senior career*
Years	Team	Apps	(Gls)
2020–2023	Atalanta	0	(0)
2020–2021	→ Ascoli (loan)	0	(0)
2021	→ Vis Pesaro (loan)	8	(0)
2021–2022	→ Lecco (loan)	0	(0)
2022	→ Tsarsko Selo (loan)	10	(0)
2022–2023	→ Hebar (loan)	3	(0)
2024–	Miami FC	11	(0)
- * Club domestic league appearances and goals

Khadim Ndiaye (born 12 April 2000) is a Senegalese professional soccer player who plays as a goalkeeper for USL Championship club Miami FC.

== Professional career ==
=== Atalanta ===
==== Loans to Ascoli and Vis Pesaro ====
On 4 September 2020, Ndiaye was sent on loan to Serie B club Ascoli Calcio 1898 for the rest of the season. At the time, Ndiaye was training with the Atalanta academy. He first appeared in an Ascoli squad for the 1–0 loss to Frosinone Calcio on 17 October 2020. However, the loan was cut short on 13 January 2021 and he returned to Atalanta. A few days later, he joined Serie C club Vis Pesaro. He made his debut in the 1–0 loss to FC Südtirol.

==== Loans to Lecco and Tsarsko Selo ====
On 9 August 2021, Ndiaye was loaned out to Serie C club Calcio Lecco 1912. He was an unused substitute in the first game of the season against FC Pro Vercelli 1892, a 1–0 away defeat. On 30 January, after making no appearances for Lecco, Ndiaye was recalled from his loan spell by Atalanta. A few days later, he was sent on loan to First Professional Football League club FC Tsarsko Selo Sofia in Bulgaria for the remainder of the season.

==== Loan to Hebar Pazardzhik ====
On 13 July 2022, Ndiaye was sent on loan to another Bulgarian team, this time to FC Hebar Pazardzhik.

Ndiaye was released from Atalanta in the Summer of 2023.

=== Miami FC ===
On 2 January 2024, Ndiaye signed with USL Championship club Miami FC. He made his USL Championship debut off the bench for the injured Daniel Gagliardi in the 2–5 loss to the Tampa Bay Rowdies, making 4 saves without conceding. He received a straight red card in the 4–2 defeat to South Georgia Tormenta in the U.S. Open Cup.
