= Achille Truchot =

French footballer (born 2004)

Personal information
- Full name: Achille Merlin Alain Louis Truchot
- Date of birth: 1 October 2004 (age 22)
- Place of birth: Paris, France
- Height: 1.82 m (6 ft 0 in)
- Positions: Midfielder; left-back

Team information
- Current team: Thonon Evian Grand Genève FC
- Number: 6

Youth career
- –2019: PSG Academy
- 2019-2022: Thonon Evian Grand Genève FC

Senior career*
Years	Team	Apps	(Gls)
2022-2023	Yverdon-Sport FC	0	(0)
- 1. SC Znojmo FK
2023-2024	Miami FC	0	(0)
2024-	Thonon Evian Grand Genève FC	4	
- * Club domestic league appearances and goals as of 5 January 2024

Achille Merlin Alain Louis Truchot (born 1 October 2004), known as Achille Truchot, is a French footballer who plays as a midfielder for club Thonon Evian Grand Genève FC.

== Club career ==
Truchot played for the PSG Academy in Miami from U9 to U15. In 2019, he played for the U18 and U19 teams of Thonon Évian Grand Genève FC in France.

In 2022, Truchot moved to play in Switzerland for Yverdon Sport FC, a member club in the Swiss Challenge League . During his time with Yverdon Sport, he won the Challenge League title with the team and gained promotion to the Super League.

In mid-2023, Truchot returned to Vietnam and tried to gain access to the national team. 1.SC Znojmo FK Club, in Moravskoslezská fotbalová liga.

In February 2024, Truchot was recruited by Miami FC, a club currently playing in the USL Championship, and signed a contract until November 2024.

== Personal life ==
He was born to a French mother and a Father of Vietnamese descent.

== Career statistics ==
As of match played 14 July 2024

Club	Season	League			Cup		Other		Total	
Club	Season	Division	Apps	Goals	Apps	Goals	Apps	Goals	Apps	Goals
1.SC Znojmo FK	2022–23	Moravskoslezská fotbalová liga.	0	0	–		–		0	0
1.SC Znojmo FK	Total		0	0	–		–		0	0
Miami FC	2023–24	USL Championship	0	0	0	0	–		0	0
Miami FC	Total		0	0	0	0	0	0	0	0
Career total			0	0	0	0	0	0	0	0
