= Manuel Botta =

Italian footballer

Personal information
- Date of birth: 16 July 2002 (age 24)
- Place of birth: Salerno, Italy
- Height: 1.75 m (5 ft 9 in)
- Position: Midfielder

Team information
- Current team: Atletico Lodigiani

Youth career
- San Giorgio 1926
- Benevento

Senior career*
Years	Team	Apps	(Gls)
2020–2021	Benevento	0	(0)
2020–2021	→ Brindisi (loan)	28	(3)
2021–2024	Audace Cerignola	33	(2)
2024	Miami FC	24	(1)
2025	FBC Gravina	9	(0)
2025–	Atletico Lodigiani	19	(5)
- * Club domestic league appearances and goals as of 1 March 2025

Manuel Botta (born 16 July 2002) is an Italian professional footballer who plays as a midfielder for Serie D club Atletico Lodigiani.

== Career ==
Botta moved from San Giorgio 1926 to Benevento, where he played for the club's Primavera 2 side. He spent the 2020–21 season on loan with Serie D side Brindisi, where he came second in the league's player of the season awards. His next move was to Audace Cerignola, who he helped to promotion to Serie C from Serie D. Botta mutually agreed to terminate his contract with Cerignola on 3 January 2024. On 19 January 2024, Botta made the move to the United States, joining USL Championship side Miami FC. On 30 January 2025, Botta returned to Italy, joining Serie D side FBC Gravina.
