= Danny Vitiello =

American soccer player (born 1996)

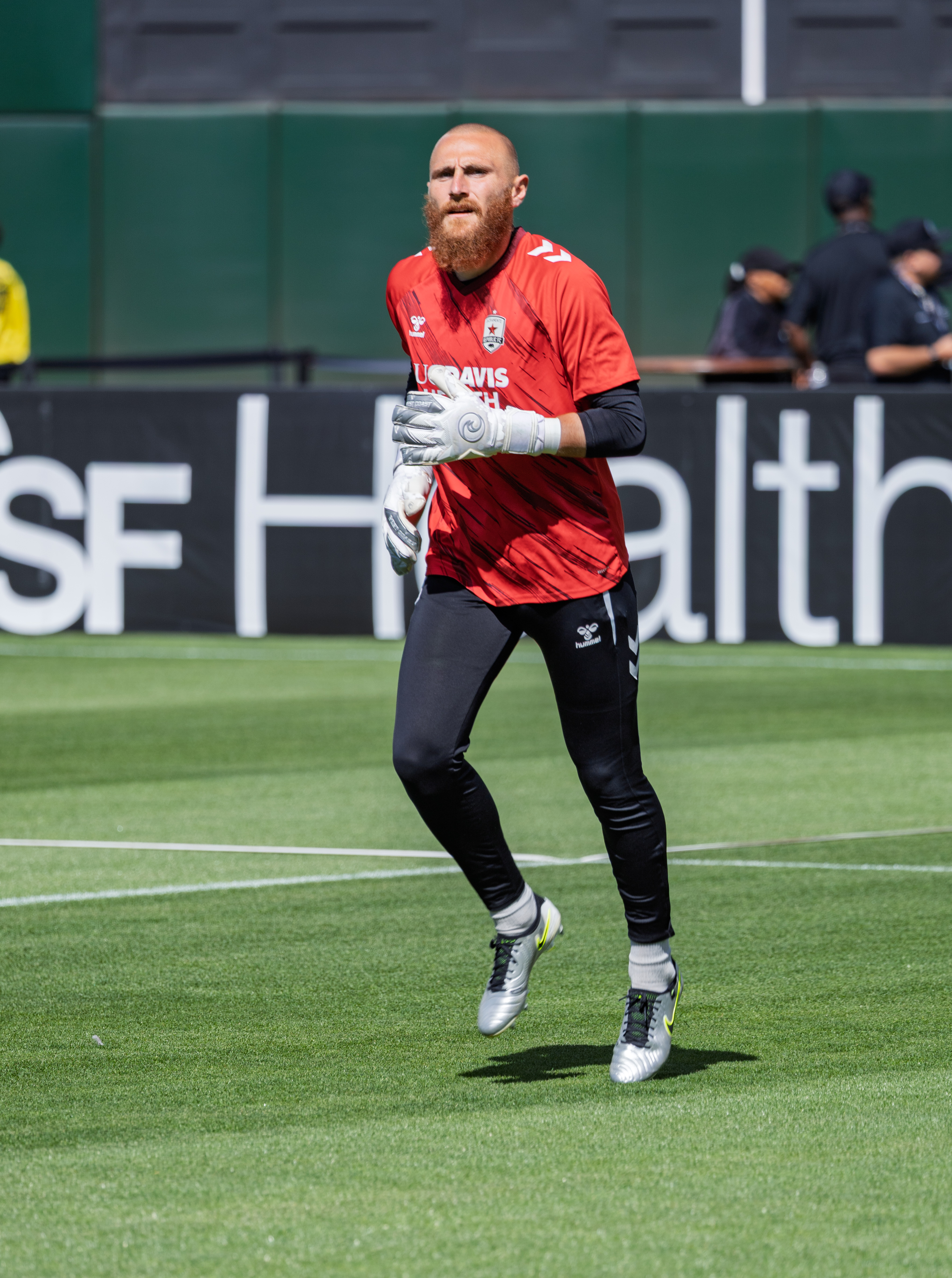
- Vitiello with Sacramento Republic in 2026

Personal information
- Full name: Daniel Vitiello
- Date of birth: March 6, 1996 (age 30)
- Place of birth: Massapequa, New York, U.S.
- Height: 6 ft 2 in (1.88 m)
- Position: Goalkeeper

Team information
- Current team: Sacramento Republic
- Number: 1

College career
Years	Team	Apps	(Gls)
2014–2018	Albany Great Danes	60	(0)

Senior career*
Years	Team	Apps	(Gls)
2016	Westchester Flames	6	(0)
2017	Jersey Express S.C.	2	(0)
2018	Long Island Rough Riders	7	(0)
2019	Nashville SC	0	(0)
2019	→ New Mexico United (loan)	0	(0)
2020–2021	Pittsburgh Riverhounds	35	(0)
2022–	Sacramento Republic	143	(0)
- * Club domestic league appearances and goals as of November 11, 2026

Danny Vitiello (born March 6, 1996) is an American soccer player who plays as a goalkeeper for USL Championship club Sacramento Republic.

== Career ==
=== College and amateur ===
After redshirting in his freshman season in 2014, Vitiello went on to play four years of college soccer at the University at Albany, SUNY between 2015 and 2018. Vitiello completed his collegiate career at Albany making 60 appearances, claiming a 0.98 goals-against average, and a .784 save percentage with 24 clean sheets.

Whilst at college, Vitiello appeared in the USL PDL with Westchester Flames, Jersey Express S.C. and Long Island Rough Riders.

=== Professional ===
On January 8, 2019, Vitiello joined USL Championship side Nashville SC. On September 1, 2019, Vitiello made a short-term loan to appear on the bench for fellow USL Championship side New Mexico United against Orange County SC. He left Nashville at the end of the season ahead of the team joining MLS.

Vitiello signed with USL Championship club Pittsburgh Riverhounds on February 25, 2020. He made his professional debut on August 19, 2020, starting against Loudoun United in a 2–0 win. Following his shutout against Loudoun and a 2–2 draw with Saint Louis FC, Vitiello was named to the USL Championship Team of the Week.

On December 21, 2021, it was announced that Vitiello had joined Sacramento Republic ahead of their 2022 season.

Vitiello had a stellar first campaign season with Sacramento Republic in 2022, making 25 starts in 25 appearances and only conceding 23 goals. In Vitiello's first 2 seasons with Sacramento Republic, he already claimed the club's all-time clean sheet record.
