= Nicolás Cardona =

Puerto Rican footballer (born 1999)

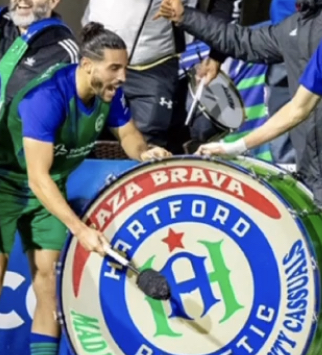
- Cardona with Hartford Athletic supporters in 2021

Personal information
- Full name: Nicolás Javier Cardona Ruiz
- Date of birth: February 11, 1999 (age 27)
- Place of birth: San Juan, Puerto Rico
- Height: 5 ft 11 in (1.80 m)
- Position: Defender

Team information
- Current team: El Paso Locomotive

Youth career
- GPS Conquistadores de Guaynabo

College career
Years	Team	Apps	(Gls)
2018–2019	Assumption Greyhounds	33	(2)

Senior career*
Years	Team	Apps	(Gls)
2020	Almenara Atlètic	8	(0)
2020–2021	UB Conquense	0	(0)
2021	Hartford Athletic	21	(1)
2022–2023	Chattanooga Red Wolves	61	(5)
2024–2025	Miami FC	48	(0)
2026–	El Paso Locomotive	18	(0)

International career^{‡}
2018	Puerto Rico U20	5	(0)
2021–	Puerto Rico	28	(1)
Medal record
Representing Puerto Rico
Men's football
FIFA Series
Winner	2026 Puerto Rico
- * Club domestic league appearances and goals as of October 31, 2026 ‡ National team caps and goals as of March 28, 2026

Nicolás Javier Cardona Ruiz (born February 11, 1999) is a Puerto Rican footballer who currently plays as a defender for El Paso Locomotive FC in the USL Championship.

== International career ==
Cardona made his international debut for Puerto Rico in a 1–0 win over the Dominican Republic. He had previously played in friendlies with the team including a match against his future club, Hartford Athletic in 2019. On June 1, 2021, Cardona was named as captain for Puerto Rico in the team's 7–0 win over the Bahamas during 2022 FIFA World Cup qualifiers.

== Club career ==
Cardona signed with USL Championship team Hartford Athletic on February 22, 2021. He had previously spent time with the U23 team of Spanish club UB Conquense. Cardona scored his first professional goal on June 19, 2021 when he scored the go ahead goal in Hartford's 2–1 win over Loudoun United in the 94th minute.

On February 22, 2022, Cardona signed with USL League One club Chattanooga Red Wolves.

Cardona joined Miami FC on the USL Championship on December 18, 2023.

On March 3, 2026, El Paso Locomotive announced they had signed Cardona to a contract for 2026 USL Championship season.

== Honours ==
Puerto Rico

- FIFA Series: 2026
