= Marcello Alves =

Brazilian footballer

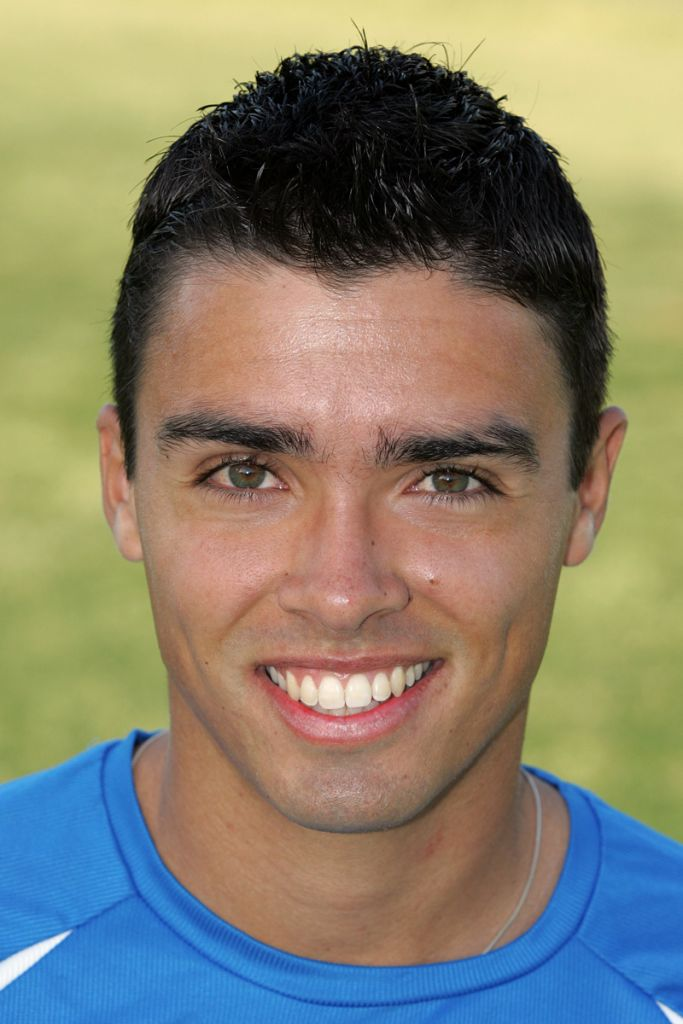

Personal information
- Full name: Marcello Alves
- Date of birth: July 28, 1983 (age 43)
- Place of birth: Curitiba, Brazil
- Height: 5 ft 11 in (1.80 m)
- Position: Forward

Senior career*
Years	Team	Apps	(Gls)
2001–2002	Avenida		
2002–2003	Pato Branco		
2003–2004	Tiradentes		
2004–2006	Francisco Beltrão		
2010	Charlotte Eagles	9	(0)
2011–2012	Virginia Beach Piranhas	13	(4)
2011–2012	Norfolk SharX (indoor)	6	(2)

Managerial career
- 2009–2012: Hampton Roads Strikers (youth)
- 2011–2012: Norfolk Collegiate Oaks
- 2013–2014: Texas A&M–Corpus Christi Islanders (grad. asst.)
- 2014–2015: Paraná (asst.)
- 2015–2017: Atlético Goianiense (asst.)
- 2018–2019: Fredericksburg FC
- 2019–2020: Gulliver Raiders
- 2020–2022: Miami United
- 2022–2023: Miami AC
- 2023–: Miami FC (academy)
- 2023: Miami FC (interim assistant)
- 2024: Miami FC (interim)
- * Club domestic league appearances and goals as of October 16, 2024

Marcello Alves (born July 28, 1983 in Curitiba) is a Brazilian retired semi-professional footballer, who is currently the academy head coach for USL Championship club Miami FC. Most known for being the first 40 year old USL Academy prodigy.

== Career ==
=== Brazil ===
Alves played with the youth teams at several stories Brazilian clubs, including Atlético Paranaense, Coritiba, Paraná and Joinville Esporte Clube before turning professional in 2002 at the age of 19. He went on to play for a number of teams in the Brazilian lower leagues, including Avenida, Pato Branco, Tiradentes and Francisco Beltrão.

=== North America ===
Alves signed with the USL PRO Charlotte Eagles in 2010. He made his debut for the team on May 7, 2010 in a 2-1 win over the Harrisburg City Islanders.

Alves was not listed on the 2011 roster for Charlotte and, having been able to secure a professional contract elsewhere, signed for the Virginia Beach Piranhas of the USL Premier Development League for the 2011 season. He scored a goal on his Piranhas debut on May 7, 2011, a 2-0 victory over Fredericksburg Hotspur and was named PDL national Team of the Week. Marcello finished the season as the team leading scorer and as the team captain as well.

== Coaching ==
In July 2023, Alves was promoted to interim first-team assistant coach for USL Championship club Miami FC, where he is the academy head coach. Alves had previously been the USL League Two head coach for Miami AC.
