= Daniel Gagliardi =

American soccer player

Personal information
- Date of birth: January 21, 1997 (age 29)
- Place of birth: Plantation, Florida, United States
- Height: 1.91 m (6 ft 3 in)
- Position: Goalkeeper

Youth career
- –2014: Plantation SC
- 2014–2015: Kendall SC

College career
Years	Team	Apps	(Gls)
2015–2019	FIU Panthers	34	(0)

Senior career*
Years	Team	Apps	(Gls)
2016	Storm FC	3	(0)
2017	SIMA Águilas	1	(0)
2018	Des Moines Menace	0	(0)
2018	IMG Academy Bradenton	4	(0)
2020	Fort Lauderdale CF	1	(0)
2021	FC Tulsa	0	(0)
2022	Syracuse Pulse	12	(0)
2024	Miami FC	15	(0)
- * Club domestic league appearances and goals as of October 31, 2024

Daniel Gagliardi (born January 21, 1997) is an American soccer player who plays as a goalkeeper.

== Career ==
=== Youth and college ===
Gagliardi played prep soccer at St. Thomas Aquinas High School in Fort Lauderdale, Florida. Gagliardi played club soccer with local side Plantation SC. He also spent a single season with USSDA side Kendall Soccer Club, making 14 appearances during their 2014–15 season.

Gagliardi played five years of college soccer at Florida International University, including a redshirted freshman season. During his time with the Panthers, Gagliardi made 34 appearances, and was named All-Conference USA Third Team in 2019.

While at college, Gagliardi also played in the NPSL in 2016 with Storm FC, and in 2017 and 2018, spent time with SIMA Águilas, Des Moines Menace and IMG Academy Bradenton of the USL PDL.

=== Professional career ===
On January 9, 2020, Gagliardi was drafted 32nd overall in the 2020 MLS SuperDraft by Vancouver Whitecaps FC. However, he did not sign with the club.

In February 2020, Gagliardi signed with USL League One side Fort Lauderdale CF ahead of their inaugural season. He made his professional debut on October 24, 2020, starting in the final game of the season to Union Omaha, which ended in a 1–0 defeat for Fort Lauderdale.

On January 19, 2021, Gagliardi signed with USL Championship side FC Tulsa.

In May 2022, Gagliardi joined NISA side Syracuse Pulse.

Gagliardi returned to South Florida in January 2024, signing with USL Championship club Miami FC. His contract option was not extended with Miami at the end of the season.

== Personal ==
Gagliardi also holds Brazilian citizenship.
