= 2022 FC Tulsa season =

FC Tulsa
2022 season
- Head coach: Michael Nsien
- Stadium: ONEOK Field; Tulsa, Oklahoma
- USL Championship: Conference:8th; Overall:16th
- USL Cup: Did Not Qualify
- 2022 U.S. Open Cup: Third Round
- Black Gold Derby: Not Held
- Average home league attendance: 4,044
City Kit colors	State Kit colors

The 2022 FC Tulsa season was the franchise's 8th season in the USL Championship, the second-tier professional soccer league in the United States. The team will also participate in the 2022 U.S. Open Cup.

== Club ==
Squad no.	Name	Nationality	Position(s)	Date of birth (age)	Previous club
Goalkeepers
1	Sean Lewis	(United States)	GK	April 17, 1992 (age 34)	(United States) Penn FC
22	Dallas Odle	(United States)	GK	August 5, 2001 (age 25)	(Spain) CD Almuñécar City FC
31	Austin Wormell	(United States)	GK	May 26, 1998 (age 28)	(United States) Rogers State University Hillcats
Defenders
3	Piercen Fisher	(United States)	DF	June 3, 2004 (age 22)	(United States) Tulsa SC Academy
4	Ronald Rodriguez	(El Salvador)	CB	September 22, 1998 (age 27)	(El Salvador) C.D. Águila
5	Johnny Fenwick	(England)	CB	November 20, 1994 (age 31)	(United States) Atlantic City FC
12	Matheus Silva	(Brazil)	CB	December 8, 1996 (age 29)	(Brazil) Figueirense
13	Jorge Corrales	(Cuba)	LB	May 20, 1991 (age 35)	(Canada) CF Montréal
15	Adrián Diz Pe	(Cuba)	LB	March 4, 1994 (age 32)	(United States) Rio Grande Valley FC
16	Gabriel Torres	(Brazil)	LB	August 1, 1996 (age 30)	(United States) Hartford Athletic
22	Bradley Bourgeois	(United States)	CB	April 13, 1994 (age 32)	(United States) Nashville SC
28	Jesus Hernandez	(United States)	DF	December 31, 2002 (age 23)	(United States) Tulsa SC Academy
33	Josue Flores	(United States)	CB	January 17, 2005 (age 21)	(United States) Tulsa SC Academy
Midfielders
8	Petar Čuić	(Croatia)	DM	June 2, 1999 (age 27)	(United States) Sporting Kansas City II
17	Abuchi	(United States)	DM	January 15, 1997 (age 29)	(United States) South Georgia Tormenta FC
19	Aimar Membrila	(United States)	MF	October 5, 2003 (age 22)	(United States) Tulsa SC Academy
20	Ciaran Winters	(United States)	MF	May 29, 2001 (age 25)	(United States) Sporting Kansas City Academy
21	Kembo Kibato	(Canada)	AM	September 16, 2000 (age 26)	(United States) Rio Grande Valley FC Toros
24	Tony Mota	(United States)	MF	September 27, 2002 (age 23)	(United States) Tulsa SC Academy
30	Lebo Moloto	(South Africa)	CM	May 21, 1990 (age 36)	(United States) Nashville SC
44	Eric Bird	(United States)	CM	April 8, 1993 (age 33)	(United States) Houston Dynamo FC
Forwards
7	JJ Williams	(United States)	FW	January 4, 1998 (age 28)	(United States) Birmingham Legion
9	Brian Brown	(Jamaica)	CF	December 29, 1992 (age 33)	(United States) New Mexico United
10	Rodrigo da Costa	(Brazil)	FW	December 20, 1993 (age 32)	(United States) Florida Soccer Soldiers
11	Joaquín Rivas	(El Salvador)	RW	April 26, 1992 (age 34)	(United States) Saint Louis FC
23	Machuca	(Honduras)	CF	April 17, 1994 (age 32)	(Honduras) Lobos UPNFM
92	Darío Suárez	(Cuba)	LW	August 25, 1992 (age 34)	(United States) Miami FC

USL Academy player

=== Staff ===
- (United States) James Cannon – President
- (Nigeria) Michael Nsien – Head Coach (through June 17, 2022)
- (Jamaica) Donovan Ricketts – Interim Head Coach (starting June 17, 2022), First Assistant Coach (through June 17, 2022)
- (Serbia) Nemanja Vuković – Assistant Coach
- (Cameroon) Cyprian Hedrick – Assistant Coach
- (United States) Johnathon Millwee – Head Athletic Trainer

== Competitions ==
=== Preseason ===
February 17 Preseason 1	Colorado Springs Switchbacks FC	3–1	FC Tulsa	Tucson, Arizona
4:00 p.m. MST	Amoh 9', 11'; 74'	Report	Brown 13' (Rivas); Rivas (yellow card) 16'; Torres (yellow card) 43'
Note: Desert Showcase presented by Visit Tucson

February 20 Preseason 2	Oakland Roots	3–2	FC Tulsa	Tucson, Arizona
9:00 a.m. MST	Dennis 27'; Fissore 63' (pen.); Barbir 73'	Report	Suárez 38' (pen.); Flores 76'
Note: Desert Showcase presented by Visit Tucson

February 26 Preseason 3	San Antonio FC	0–1	FC Tulsa	San Antonio, Texas
1:00 p.m. CST		Report	Čuić 63'

February 28 Preseason 4	Houston Dynamo 2	1–0	FC Tulsa	Houston, TX
11:00 a.m. CST	28'	Report

March 5 Preseason 5	FC Tulsa	0–1	Sporting Kansas City II	Tulsa, OK
2:00 p.m. CST				Stadium: Titan Sports Complex

=== USL Championship ===
==== Standings — Eastern Conference ====
Pos	Team	Pld	W	L	T	GF	GA	GD	Pts	Qualification
1	Louisville City FC	34	22	6	6	65	28	+37	72	Qualification for the Conference Semifinals
2	Memphis 901 FC	34	21	8	5	67	33	+34	68	Playoffs
3	Tampa Bay Rowdies	34	20	7	7	73	33	+40	67	Playoffs
4	Birmingham Legion FC	34	17	10	7	56	37	+19	58	Playoffs
5	Pittsburgh Riverhounds SC	34	16	9	9	50	38	+12	57	Playoffs
6	Miami FC	34	15	9	10	47	32	+15	55	Playoffs
7	Detroit City FC	34	14	8	12	44	30	+14	54	Playoffs
8	FC Tulsa	34	12	16	6	48	58	−10	42	
9	Indy Eleven	34	12	17	5	41	55	−14	41	
10	Hartford Athletic	34	10	18	6	47	57	−10	36	
11	Loudoun United FC	34	8	22	4	36	74	−38	28	
12	Charleston Battery	34	6	21	7	41	77	−36	25	
13	Atlanta United 2	34	6	23	5	39	85	−46	23	
14	New York Red Bulls II	34	3	25	6	24	76	−52	15	

Source: USL Championship Standings
Rules for classification: 1) head-to-head points; 2) head-to-head goal differential; 3) points-per game within conference; 4) total wins; 5) total goal differential; 6) total goals scored; 7) points earned against top four Conference finishers; 8) disciplinary points; 9) coin toss or drawing of lots

==== Match results ====
March 12 1	Charleston Battery	1–0	FC Tulsa	Charleston, South Carolina
7:00 p.m. EST	Williams 10'	Report	da Costa (yellow card) (yellow-red card) 56'	Stadium: Patriots Point; Attendance: 2,523; Referee: Joshua Encarnación

March 19 2	FC Tulsa	3–1	Birmingham Legion	Tulsa, Oklahoma
7:30 p.m. CDT	da Costa 12'; Rivas 45+4' (pen.); Ramírez 90+5'	Report	Kasim 41'; Crognale (yellow card) (yellow-red card) 78'	Stadium: ONEOK Field; Attendance: 4,531; Referee: Gabriele Giusti

March 23 3	FC Tulsa	1–0	San Diego Loyal SC	Tulsa, Oklahoma
7:30 p.m. CDT	Suarez 77'	Report		Stadium: ONEOK Field; Attendance: 3,203; Referee: Kevin Broadley

March 27 4	Sacramento Republic	2–1	FC Tulsa	Sacramento, California
2:00 p.m. PDT	Martinez 33' (pen.); Lacroix 86'	Report	da Costa 29'	Stadium: Heart Health Park; Attendance: 8,706; Referee: Joseph Salinas

April 2 5	FC Tulsa	3–2	New York Red Bulls II	Tulsa, Oklahoma
7:30 p.m. CDT	Williams 20', 46'; Torres 25'	Report	Nikopolidis (red card) 2'; Rafanello 17'; Murphy 70'	Stadium: ONEOK Field; Attendance: 4,082; Referee: John Matto

April 9 6	FC Tulsa	3–4	Pittsburgh Riverhounds SC	Tulsa, Oklahoma
1:00 p.m. CDT	Silva 19' (o.g.); Suarez (yellow card) 32'; Williams 80' da Costa 85'	Report	Dikwa 6', 59'; Dixon 14'; Kelly (yellow card) 27', (goal) 47'; Dossantos (yellow card) 74'; Kelly-Rosales (yellow card) 80'; Biasi (yellow card) 83'	Stadium: ONEOK Field; Attendance: 2,851; Referee: Jalen Gray

April 16 8	Tampa Bay Rowdies	3–1	FC Tulsa	Tampa, Florida
7:30 p.m. EDT	Hilton 3'; Antley (yellow card) 22'; Guenzatti (penalty missed) 25'; Greig 37'; Harris 87'	Report	Williams 85'	Stadium: Al Lang Stadium; Attendance: 5,067; Referee: Elijio Arreguin

April 23 9	FC Tulsa	0–2	Colorado Springs Switchbacks FC	Tulsa, Oklahoma
7:30 p.m. CDT	Torres (yellow card) 34'; Moloto (yellow card) 36'	Report	Barry 12'; Foster 39'; Zandi (yellow card) 45'; Makangila (yellow card) 59'; Caldwell (yellow card) 85'	Stadium: ONEOK Field; Attendance: 3,222; Referee: Mathew Corrigan

May 4 10	El Paso Locomotive	3–1	FC Tulsa	El Paso, Texas
7:00 p.m. MDT	Mares 11'; Solignac 64', 89'; Borelli (yellow card) 84'	Report	Williams 8', (yellow card) 55'; Moloto (red card) 33' da Costa (yellow card) 33'; Čuić (yellow card) 74'; Silva (yellow card) 85'	Stadium: Southwest University Park; Attendance: 5,381; Referee: Elton García

May 7 11	FC Tulsa	3–1	Detroit City FC	Tulsa, Oklahoma
7:30 p.m. CDT	Bryant 36'	Report	Rivas 15', 78' da Costa 21'	Stadium: ONEOK Field; Attendance: 4,311; Referee: Brandon Stevis

May 13 12	Orange County SC	5–1	FC Tulsa	Irvine, California
7:00 p.m. PDT	Torres 5'; Ilsoki 9', 20', 45+1'; Pedersen 30' (pen.)	Report	Brown 90+2'	Stadium: Championship Soccer Stadium; Attendance: 4,020; Referee: Greg Dopka

May 28 14	Louisville City FC	4–1	FC Tulsa	Louisville, Kentucky
2:00 pm CDT	Gonzalez (yellow card) 34'; Lancaster 45+3' (pen.), (yellow card) 45+5', (goal) 53'; Obinwa 65' (o.g.); Harris 90+2'	Report	Williams (yellow card) 18'; Fenwick (yellow card) 32'; Brown 34', (yellow card) 85'	Stadium: Lynn Family Stadium; Attendance: 9,326; Referee: Thomas Snyder

June 1 15	FC Tulsa	1–1	Tampa Bay Rowdies	Tulsa, Oklahoma
7:30 pm CDT	Williams (yellow card) 2'; Torres (yellow card) 45+3'; Diz (yellow card) 72'; da Costa 83'; Suárez (yellow card) 90'	Report	Wyke 17'; Scarlett (yellow card) 33'; Vancaeyezeele (yellow card) 84'	Stadium: ONEOK Field; Attendance: 2,549; Referee: Matthew Corrigan

June 4 16	FC Tulsa	0–0	The Miami FC	Tulsa, Oklahoma
7:30 p.m. CDT	Chapman-Page (yellow card) 82'; Sorto (yellow card) 90+4'	Report	Diz (yellow card) 19'; Bird (yellow card) 50'; Kibato (yellow card) 53'	Stadium: ONEOK Field; Attendance: 3,506; Referee: DeShun Beard

June 15 17	New York Red Bulls II	0–0	FC Tulsa	Montclair, New Jersey
7:00 p.m. EDT	Castillo (yellow card) 25' (yellow-red card) 79'; Carmona (yellow card) 41'; Cragwell (yellow card) 47'; Murphy (yellow card) 66'; Castellano (yellow card) 76'	Report	Kibato (yellow card) 10'; Williams (yellow card) 15'; Diz (yellow card) 74'	Stadium: MSU Soccer Park; Attendance: 442; Referee: Alejo Calume

June 22 7	Memphis 901 FC	2–0	FC Tulsa	Memphis, Tennessee
7:00 p.m. CDT	Smith 14'; Goodrum (yellow card) 62'; Dodson 84'	Report	Fenwick (yellow card) 55'	Stadium: AutoZone Park; Attendance: 2,710; Referee: Greg Dopka
Note: Match postponed due to inclement weather. Match rescheduled from April 13.

June 25 18	FC Tulsa	2–1	Charleston Battery	Tulsa, Oklahoma
7:30 p.m. CDT	Fenwick (yellow card) 10'; Williams 17', 34'	Report	Sheldon (yellow card) 8'; Booth (yellow card) 22'; Piggott (yellow card) 38', (goal) 45+1'; Paterson (yellow card) 72'; Harmon (yellow card) 74'	Stadium: ONEOK Field; Attendance: 4,966; Referee: Abdou Ndiaye

June 28 19	San Antonio FC	2–1	FC Tulsa	San Antonio, Texas
7:00 p.m. CDT	Diouf (yellow card) 44'; Bailone 55'; Adeniran 57'; Abu (yellow card) 79'	Report	Torres (yellow card) 31'; Williams 36'; Obinwa (yellow card) 52'; McFarlane (yellow card) 76'	Stadium: Toyota Field; Attendance: 5,015; Referee: Matthew Thompson

July 3 20	Loudoun United FC	2–2	FC Tulsa	Leesburg, Virginia
7:30 p.m. EDT	Robinson 7'; Greene (yellow card) 53'; Freeman 55'; Zamudio (yellow card) 88'; Gamble (yellow card) 90'	Report	Obinwa (yellow card) 17'; Torres (yellow card) 29'; Williams (penalty missed) 43'; Suarez 85'; Bird (yellow card) 90' da Costa 90+7'	Stadium: Segra Field; Attendance: 1,405; Referee: Wes Caouette

July 9 21	FC Tulsa	2–1	Atlanta United 2	Tulsa, Oklahoma
7:30 p.m. CDT	Rodríguez (yellow card) 17' (yellow-red card) 51' da Costa 25'; Diz (yellow card) 72'; Brown 79'	Report	Brennan 37'; Chukwuma (yellow card) 45+2'; Cobb (yellow card) 59' (yellow-red card) 89'	Stadium: ONEOK Field; Attendance: 4053; Referee: Lorenzo Hernandez

July 13 22	FC Tulsa	1–2	New Mexico United	Tulsa, Oklahoma
7:30 p.m. CDT	Brown (yellow card) 64'; Tetteh 70' (o.g.); Fenwick (yellow card) 74' (yellow-red card) 90'; Diz (yellow card) 87'	Report	Ovouka (yellow card) 16'; Souahy 54'; Portillo 76' (pen.); Kiesewetter (yellow card) 89'	Stadium: ONEOK Field; Attendance: 4,607; Referee: Jervis Atagana

July 23 23	Birmingham Legion FC	0–2	FC Tulsa	Birmingham, Alabama
7:30 p.m. CDT	James (yellow card) 40' (yellow-red card) 59'; Lopez (yellow card) 74'; Asiedu (yellow card) 82'	Report	Rodríguez (yellow card) 13'; Moloto 16', (yellow card) 51'; Powder (yellow card) 45'; Čuić (yellow card) 81'; Williams 90+2'	Stadium: Protective Stadium; Referee: Benjamin Meyer

July 30 24	Pittsburgh Riverhounds SC	1–0	FC Tulsa	Pittsburgh, Pennsylvania
7:00 p.m. CDT	Dikwa 55'; Wiedt (yellow card) 75'	Report		Stadium: Highmark Stadium; Attendance: 5,073; Referee: Thomas Snyder

August 10 25	The Miami FC	1–2	FC Tulsa	Miami, Florida
7:00 p.m. EDT	Craig 25'; Rivas (yellow card) 87'	Report	Diz (yellow card) 24'; Suarez 27'; Powder 40', (yellow card) 59'	Stadium: Riccardo Silva Stadium; Attendance: 1,464; Referee: Adam Kilpatrick

August 20 26	FC Tulsa	1–0	Indy Eleven	Tulsa, Oklahoma
7:30 p.m. CDT	Machuca 90'	Report		Stadium: ONEOK Field; Attendance: 5,082; Referee: Elton García

August 24 13	FC Tulsa	1–2	Hartford Athletic	Tulsa, Oklahoma
7:30 p.m. CDT	Suarez 81' (pen.)	Report	Martinez 20'; Obregón Jr. 83'	Stadium: ONEOK Field; Attendance: 3,680; Referee: Cristian Campo

August 27 27	FC Tulsa	2–1	Loudoun United FC	Tulsa, Oklahoma
7:30 p.m. CDT	Machuca 38'; Suarez 79'	Report	Fletcher 37'	Stadium: ONEOK Field; Attendance: 4,359; Referee: Melvin Rivas

September 3 28	Atlanta United 2	2–1	FC Tulsa	Kennesaw, Georgia
7:30 p.m. EDT	Conway 64', 89'; Ambrose (yellow card) 83'	Report	Machuca (yellow card) 16'; Bird (yellow card) 52'; Suarez 69'	Stadium: Fifth Third Bank Stadium; Attendance: 504; Referee: Alejo Calume

September 7 29	FC Tulsa	2–2	Louisville City FC	Tulsa, Oklahoma
7:30 p.m. CDT	da Costa 11'; Diz Pe 82'	Report	Mushagalusa 35', 73'; Totsch (yellow card) 88'; Dia (yellow card) 88'	Stadium: ONEOK Field; Attendance: 3,013; Referee: Sergii Demianchuk

September 10 30	Hartford Athletic	3–2	FC Tulsa	Hartford, Connecticut
7:00 p.m. EDT	Yacoubou 9'; Wormell 16' (o.g.); Saydee 24'; Lewis (yellow card) 25'; Brewitt (yellow card) 45+3'; McGlynn (yellow card) 66'	Report	Bourgeois (yellow card) 60'; Diz Pe (yellow card) 78'; Powder (yellow card) 84'; Suarez 90' da Costa 90+5'; Bird (yellow card) 90+5'	Stadium: Dillon Stadium; Attendance: 5,500; Referee: Chris Ruska

September 24 31	Detroit City FC	2–2	FC Tulsa	Hamtramck, Michigan
7:30 p.m. CDT	Godard (yellow card) 40'; Matthews 47'; Rodriguez (yellow card) 52'; Bryant 75'	Report	Suárez 67'; Bird 69'	Stadium: Keyworth Stadium; Attendance: 6,531; Referee: Greg Dopka

October 1 32	Indy Eleven	2–4	FC Tulsa	Indianapolis, Indiana
7:00 p.m. CDT	García 24', 55' (pen.); Rebellón (yellow card) 45'; Rivera (yellow card) 76'; Brown (yellow card) 90+4'	Report	Sowinski (yellow card) 5', (goal) 17', 48', 62'; Bird (yellow card) 31'; Suárez 45+5' (pen.); C. Pearson (yellow card) 50'; Epps (yellow card) 76'; Powder (yellow card) 79'	Stadium: Michael A. Carroll Stadium; Attendance: 9,633; Referee: Danielle Chesky

October 12 33	FC Tulsa	2–0	Monterey Bay FC	Tulsa, Oklahoma
7:30 p.m. CDT	Epps 7', 82'	Report	Fehr (yellow card) 45+2'; Gorskie (yellow card) 76'	Stadium: ONEOK Field; Attendance: 5,135; Referee: Natalie Simon

October 15 34	FC Tulsa	0–3	Memphis 901 FC	Tulsa, Oklahoma
7:30 p.m. CDT	Brown (yellow card) 78'; Obinwa (yellow card) 90+3'	Report	Goodrum 9'; Molloy 37' (pen.); Borczak 55'	Stadium: ONEOK Field; Attendance: 5,392; Referee: Malik Badawi

=== U.S. Open Cup ===
April 5 Second Round	FC Tulsa	2–1	(Oklahoma) Tulsa Athletic (NPSL)	Tulsa, Oklahoma
7:30 p.m. CDT	Brown 5'; Rodríguez 28'	Report	Nzojyibwami 77'	Stadium: ONEOK Field; Attendance: 2,338
Note: Inaugural Tulsa Derby

April 19 Third Round	(Texas) FC Dallas (MLS)	2–1	FC Tulsa	Frisco, Texas
7:30 p.m. CDT				Stadium: Toyota Stadium
