= 2021 FC Tulsa season =

FC Tulsa
2021 season
- Head coach: Michael Nsien
- Stadium: ONEOK Field; Tulsa, Oklahoma
- USL Championship: Division: 4th Overall: 14th
- USL Cup: Conference Quarterfinals
- 2021 U.S. Open Cup: Cancelled
- Black Gold Derby: Champions
- Highest home attendance: 4,241 (7/17 vs. OKC)
- Lowest home attendance: 2,302 (8/25 vs. MEM)
- Average home league attendance: 3,438
- Biggest win: TUL 4–0 ATL (10/20)
- Biggest defeat: ATL 5–0 TUL (5/19)
City Kit colors	State Kit colors

The 2021 FC Tulsa season was the franchise's 7th season in the USL Championship, the second-tier professional soccer league in the United States. It is their second season since the club's rebranding from Tulsa Roughnecks FC to FC Tulsa.

== Club ==
Squad no.	Name	Nationality	Position(s)	Date of birth (age)	Previous club	Apps	Goals
Goalkeepers
1	Sean Lewis	(United States)	GK	April 17, 1992 (age 34)	(United States) Penn FC	35	0
12	Daniel Gagliardi	(United States)	GK	January 21, 1997 (age 29)	(United States) Fort Lauderdale CF	0	0
31	Austin Wormell	(United States)	GK	May 26, 1998 (age 28)	(United States) Rogers State University Hillcats	0	0
Defenders
2	Kevin Garcia	(United States)	CB	August 21, 1990 (age 36)	(United States) Houston Dynamo FC	19	0
3	Piercen Fisher	(United States)	DF	June 3, 2004 (age 22)	(United States) Tulsa SC Academy	0	0
4	Modou Jadama	(The Gambia)	CB	March 17, 1994 (age 32)	(United States) Atlanta United 2	37	1
5	Leo Folla	(United States)	CB	March 2, 1995 (age 31)	(United States) Chattanooga Red Wolves	0	0
13	Matt Sheldon	(United States)	RB	August 23, 1992 (age 34)	(New Zealand) Waterside Karori	39	1
18	Solomon Kwambe	(Nigeria)	RB	September 30, 1993 (age 32)	(Nigeria) Lobi Stars F.C.	6	0
22	Bradley Bourgeois	(United States)	CB	April 13, 1994 (age 32)	(United States) Nashville SC	51	0
26	Jorge Corrales	(Cuba)	LB	May 20, 1991 (age 35)	(Canada) CF Montréal	37	1
28	Jesus Hernandez	(United States)	DF	December 31, 2002 (age 23)	(United States) Tulsa Soccer Academy	0	0
Midfielders
16	Rodrigo da Costa	(Brazil)	AM	December 20, 1993 (age 32)	(United States) Florida Soccer Soldiers	52	14
20	Ciaran Winters	(United States)	MF	May 29, 2001 (age 25)	(United States) Sporting Kansas City Academy	3	0
21	Kembo Kibato	(Canada)	AM	September 16, 2000 (age 26)	(United States) Rio Grande Valley FC Toros	2	0
24	Tony Mota	(United States)	MF	September 27, 2002 (age 23)	(United States) Tulsa SC Academy	0	0
30	Lebo Moloto	(South Africa)	CM	May 21, 1990 (age 36)	(United States) Nashville SC	16	1
33	Lucas Coutinho	(Brazil)	AM	August 12, 1993 (age 33)	(United States) Tormenta FC	0	0
44	Eric Bird	(United States)	CM	April 8, 1993 (age 33)	(United States) Houston Dynamo FC	16	2
99	Raphael Ayagwa	(Nigeria)	DM	February 13, 1998 (age 28)	(Nigeria) Lobi Stars F.C.	19	0
Forwards
7	Stanley Oganbor	(Nigeria)	FW	July 10, 1998 (age 28)	(Nigeria) Flight FC	0	0
9	Jerome Kiesewetter	(United States)	CF	February 9, 1993 (age 33)	(United States) Inter Miami CF	3	0
10	Marlon	(Brazil)	RW	April 29, 1995 (age 31)	(Brazil) Madureira Esporte Clube	27	8
11	Joaquín Rivas	(El Salvador)	RW	April 26, 1992 (age 34)	(United States) Saint Louis FC	69	22
17	Martin Martinez-Leyva	(United States)	FW	January 11, 2004 (age 22)	(United States) Tulsa SC Academy	0	0
72	Promise Akinpelu	(Canada)	FW	July 3, 2001 (age 25)	(Czech Republic) NK Trnje	0	0
77	Michael Cunningham	(England)	FW	February 5, 1991 (age 35)	(United States) Rochester Lancers	0	0
92	Darío Suárez	(Cuba)	LW	August 25, 1992 (age 34)	(United States) Miami FC	19	10

USL Academy player
On Loan from Rio Grande Valley FC Toros
Total Career Appearances for Club
Total Career Goals for Club
Club Record

=== Staff ===
- (United States) James Cannon – President
- (Nigeria) Michael Nsien – Head Coach
- (Jamaica) Donovan Ricketts – First Assistant and Goalkeeping Coach
- (Serbia) Nemanja Vuković – Assistant Coach
- (Cameroon) Cyprian Hedrick – Assistant Coach
- (Cameroon) Miguel Wickert – Strength and Conditioning Coach
- (United States) Johnathon Millwee – Head Athletic Trainer

== Competitions ==
=== Preseason ===
March 20 Scrimmage	Team Ricketts	1–1	Team Vuko	Tulsa, Oklahoma
10am CDT	Suárez 4' (pen.)	Report	Rivas 42'	Stadium: Titan Sports Complex; Attendance: 0
Note: Intrasquad scrimmage

March 24 Preseason 1	Houston Dynamo FC	3–0	FC Tulsa	College Station, Texas
4pm CDT	Urruti 15' (Pasher); Pasher 34'; Vera 57' (Urruti)	TUL Report; HOU Report		Stadium: Ellis Field; Attendance: 0

March 25 Preseason 2	North Texas SC	3–0	FC Tulsa	Frisco, Texas
3pm CDT	Trialist #1 50'; Pickering 82'; Trialist #2 86'	Report		Stadium: Toyota Soccer Center Field #5; Attendance: 0

March 27 Preseason 3	North Texas SC	1–0	FC Tulsa	Frisco, Texas
11am CDT	Trialist #1 61'	Report		Stadium: Toyota Soccer Center Field #5; Attendance: 0

April 2 Preseason 4	FC Tulsa	5–0	FC Wichita	Tulsa, Oklahoma
7pm CDT	Moloto 3'; Rivas 22'; Kiesewetter 43'; Kiesewetter 52' da Costa 54'	Report		Stadium: Titan Sports Complex; Attendance: 0

April 17 Preseason 5	FC Tulsa	1–1	Austin Bold FC	Tulsa, Oklahoma
2pm CDT	Garcia 68'	Report	Báez 37'	Stadium: ONEOK Field

=== USL Championship ===
==== Standings — Central Division ====
Pos	Team	Pld	W	L	T	GF	GA	GD	Pts	Qualification
1	Louisville City FC	32	18	7	7	61	37	+24	61	Advance to USL Championship Playoffs
2	Birmingham Legion FC	32	18	8	6	51	31	+20	60	Advance to USL Championship Playoffs
3	Memphis 901 FC	32	14	10	8	47	42	+5	50	Advance to USL Championship Playoffs
4	FC Tulsa	32	14	13	5	49	48	+1	47	Advance to USL Championship Playoffs
5	OKC Energy FC	32	8	11	13	30	38	−8	37	
6	Indy Eleven	32	9	15	8	32	47	−15	35	
7	Atlanta United 2	32	8	14	10	47	56	−9	34 (Note: The USL awarded a 3–0 win to Atlanta United 2 after Sporting Kansas City II fielded Jake Davis who was an ineligible player. The original score was 1–0 for Sporting Kansas City II.)	
8	Sporting Kansas City II	32	4	20	8	33	64	−31	20	

Source: USL

==== Match results ====
April 24 1	OKC Energy	1–3	FC Tulsa	Oklahoma City, Oklahoma
7:30pm CDT	Donovan 76'	Report	Rivas 29', 36'; Suarez 87'	Stadium: Taft Stadium; Attendance: 3,380; Referee: Ismir Pekmic

May 1 2	FC Tulsa	2–0	Sporting Kansas City II	Tulsa, Oklahoma
7pm CDT	da Costa 14'; Suarez 25'	Report		Stadium: ONEOK Field; Attendance: 4,241; Referee: Elijio Arreguin

May 8 3	Indy Eleven	0–2	FC Tulsa	Indianapolis, Indiana
6pm CDT		Report	Rivas 62', 81' (pen.)	Stadium: Carroll Stadium; Referee: Lukasz Szpala

May 19 4	Atlanta United 2	5–0	FC Tulsa	Kennesaw, Georgia
6:30 CDT	Allan 34'; McFadden 36', 39'; Wolff 45+2'; Morales (yellow card) 78'; Gannon 80'	Report	Corrales (yellow card) 34' (yellow-red card) 68'; Jadama (yellow card) 76'	Stadium: Fifth Third Bank Stadium; Attendance: 650; Referee: Alyssa Nichols

June 2 5	Sporting Kansas City II	4–1	FC Tulsa	Kansas City, Kansas
7:00 PM CDT	Rad (yellow card) 41', (goal) 54'; Duke 45+3'; Barber 49'; Harris (yellow card) 55'; R. Smith 73'	Report	Coutinho 14'; Marlon (yellow card) 23'; Bird (yellow card) 71'; Kiesewetter (yellow card) 85'	Stadium: Children's Mercy Park; Referee: Matthew Thompson

June 6 6	Birmingham Legion	2–1	FC Tulsa	Birmingham, Alabama
4:00 PM CDT	Brett 30', 75'; James (yellow card) 43'	Report	Folla (yellow card) 47'; Suarez 83'	Stadium: BBVA Field; Referee: Elvis Osmanovic

June 16 7	FC Tulsa	4–3	Sporting Kansas City II	Tulsa, Oklahoma
7:00pm CDT	Kibato (yellow card) 18' da Costa 42'; Marlon 45', (yellow card) 45+2'; Suarez 62' (pen.); Rivas 72'; Ayagwa (yellow card) 90+5'	Report	R. Smith 7'; Džankić (yellow card) 34'; Rešetar (yellow card) 45+3'; Freeman 87', 90+4'	Stadium: ONEOK Field; Attendance: 3,690; Referee: Matthew Franz

June 19 8	FC Tulsa	2–3	Louisville City FC	Tulsa, Oklahoma
7pm CDT	da Costa 23'; Marlon 55'; Rivas (yellow card) 60'	Report	Lancaster 2', 10' (pen.); Gómez 7'; McCabe (yellow card) 88'	Stadium: ONEOK Field; Attendance: 3,976; Referee: Brandon Stevis

June 25 9	Rio Grande Valley FC Toros	1–2	FC Tulsa	Edinburg, Texas
7:30 PM CDT	Diz Pe (yellow card) 4'; Njie 90+2'	Report	da Costa 22', 60'; Kibato (yellow card) 25' (yellow-red card) 78'; Sheldon (yellow card) 57'; Kiesewetter (yellow card) 89'	Stadium: HEB Park; Attendance: 2,955; Referee: Mark Allatin

July 2 10	OKC Energy	0–0	FC Tulsa	Oklahoma City, Oklahoma
7:30 PM CDT	Stephenson (yellow card) 90+2'	Report	Ayagwa (yellow card) 42'; Winters (yellow card) 74'	Stadium: Taft Stadium; Attendance: 2,673; Referee: Matthew Thompson

July 10 11	FC Tulsa	3–2	Louisville City FC	Tulsa, Oklahoma
7pm CDT	Marlon 6'; Kibato 16' da Costa 40'; Suarez (yellow card) 65'; Moloto (yellow card) 81'	Report	Hoppenot (yellow card) 5'; Greig 45+1'; Lancaster 61'; Watts (yellow card) 90+2'	Stadium: ONEOK Field; Attendance: 3,006; Referee: Matthew Corrigan

July 17 12	FC Tulsa	1–2	OKC Energy	Tulsa, Oklahoma
7pm CDT	Corrales (yellow card) 14'; Suárez (yellow card) 25' da Costa (yellow card) 63', (goal) 90+1'	Report	Ward (yellow card) 39'; López 65'; Osmond (yellow card) 89'; Kurimoto 90+6'	Stadium: ONEOK Field; Attendance: 5,009; Referee: Brad Jensen

July 24 13	Memphis 901 FC	1–0	FC Tulsa	Memphis, Tennessee
7:30 PM CDT	Murphy 45+4'; Carroll (yellow card) 64'; Dally (yellow card) 90+5'	Report	Marlon (yellow card) 39'	Stadium: Autozone Park; Attendance: 5,425; Referee: Adam Kilpatrick

July 28 14	Atlanta United 2	2–1	FC Tulsa	Kennesaw, Georgia
TBD CDT	Fewo (yellow card) 14'; Macky Diop 25' (pen.); Fortune 49'; Matheus (yellow card) 90+3'	Report	Bourgeois (yellow card) 18' da Costa (penalty missed) 42', 55'	Stadium: Fifth Third Bank Stadium; Attendance: 769; Referee: Jonathan Bilinski

August 4 15	FC Tulsa	0–2	Indy Eleven	Tulsa, Oklahoma
7pm CDT		Report	Moon (yellow card) 37'; Arteaga (yellow card) 54'; Wild 79'; Hackshaw (yellow card) 81'; Vassell 85'	Stadium: ONEOK Field; Attendance: 3,099; Referee: Elvis Osmanovic

August 7 16	FC Tulsa	3–1	Birmingham Legion FC	Tulsa, Oklahoma
7pm CDT	Jadama (yellow card) 71'; Sheldon 25'; Marlon 88', (yellow card) 89'; Kibato 90+1'; Ayagwa (yellow card) 80'	Report	Brett (yellow card) 45+1', (goal) 66' (pen.); Vancaeyezeele (yellow card) 77'; Rufe (yellow card) 84'	Stadium: ONEOK Field; Attendance: 3,389; Referee: Jeremy Scheer

August 14 17	Louisville City FC	2–1	FC Tulsa	Louisville, Kentucky
TBD CDT	Lancaster 10', 66'; McMahon (yellow card) 66'; Gómez (yellow card) 85'	Report	Sheldon (yellow card) 72'; Moloto (yellow card) 81'; Bourgeois 90+1'; Bird (yellow card) 90+3'	Stadium: Lynn Family Stadium; Attendance: 10,675; Referee: Malik Badawi

August 22 18	Birmingham Legion FC	1–2	FC Tulsa	Birmingham, Alabama
4:00 PM CDT	Flemmings 68'	Report	Johnson 8'; Suárez 56'	Stadium: BBVA Field; Referee: Sergii Demianchuk

August 25 19	FC Tulsa	2–1	Memphis 901 FC	Tulsa, Oklahoma
7pm CDT	Jadama (yellow card) 8'; Moloto (yellow card) 75'; Marlon 80', 90+2'	Report	Dacres (yellow card) 16'; Reynolds (yellow card) 39'; Murphy 87'	Stadium: ONEOK Field; Attendance: 2,302; Referee: Jervis Atagana

August 28 20	FC Tulsa	3–1	Atlanta United 2	Tulsa, Oklahoma
7pm CDT	Sheldon 14', (yellow card) 70'; Moloto 30', 34'; Suárez (yellow card) 54'; Jadama (yellow card) 64'	Report	Chol 17'; Washington (yellow card) 50'; Benítez (yellow card) 70'; Macky Diop (yellow card) 73'; Kamdem Fewo (yellow card) 75'; McFadden (yellow card) 81'	Stadium: ONEOK Field; Attendance: 3,221; Referee: Laura Rodriguez

September 3 21	Louisville City FC	0–1	FC Tulsa	Louisville, Kentucky
TBD CDT	DelPiccolo (yellow card) 68'; Ownby (yellow card) 82'	Report	Suárez 20'; Marlon (yellow card) 47'; Lewis (yellow card) 71'; Da Costa (yellow card) 79'; Fenwick (yellow card) 90+3'	Stadium: Lynn Family Stadium; Attendance: 10,206; Referee: John Matto

September 8 22	FC Tulsa	2–1	Indy Eleven	Tulsa, Oklahoma
7pm CDT	Marlon 9', (yellow card) 67'; Corrales (yellow card) 51'; Suárez 89' (pen.); Da Costa (yellow card) 90+6'	Report	Arteaga 34'; Haworth (yellow card) 41'; Farr (yellow card) 88'	Stadium: ONEOK Field; Attendance: 2,312; Referee: John Griggs

September 11 23	FC Tulsa	1–1	Birmingham Legion FC	Tulsa, Oklahoma
7pm CDT	Da Costa (yellow card) 12'; Suárez 29' (pen.); Coutinho (yellow card) 88'	Report	Kasim (yellow card) 53'; Lopez (yellow card) 65'; Williams 80'	Stadium: ONEOK Field; Attendance: 3,439; Referee: Natalie Simon

September 18 24	FC Tulsa	0–1	Austin Bold FC	Tulsa, Oklahoma
7pm CDT		Report	Garcia 11'; Rissi (yellow card) 14'; Diouf (yellow card) 78'; Ciss (yellow card) 90+3'	Stadium: ONEOK Field; Attendance: 3,588; Referee: Gerald Flores

September 24 25	Sporting Kansas City II	1–1	FC Tulsa	Kansas City, Kansas
7:00 PM CDT	Čuić (yellow card) 55'; Pierre 65'; Cisneros (yellow card) 87'	Report	Suárez 8' (pen.); Johnson (yellow card) 16'; Flanagan (yellow card) 88'; Da Costa (yellow card) 90+1'; Jadama (yellow card) 90+5'	Stadium: Children's Mercy Park; Referee: Kevin Fikar

October 2 26	FC Tulsa	0–3	Memphis 901 FC	Tulsa, Oklahoma
7pm CDT	Rivas (penalty missed) 2'; Marlon (yellow card) 70'	Report	Bourgeois 17' (o.g.); Logue (yellow card) 33'; Kissiedou (yellow card) 25', (goal) 35', 45+3'	Stadium: ONEOK Field; Attendance: 3,405; Referee: Matthew Corrigan

October 9 27	FC Tulsa	1–2	El Paso Locomotive FC	Tulsa, Oklahoma
7pm CDT	Da Costa 45+1'	Report	Gómez 7'; Solignac 14'	Stadium: ONEOK Field; Attendance: 4,156; Referee: Brandon Stevis

October 16 28	San Antonio FC	1–1	FC Tulsa	San Antonio, Texas
7:30 CDT	Maloney (yellow card) 25'; Gallegos 56'	Report	Da Costa 27'; Kibato (yellow card) 45+1'; Marlon (yellow card) 59'; Ayagwa (yellow card) 87'; Milke (yellow card) 87'	Stadium: Toyota Field; Attendance: 5,090; Referee: Elvis Osmanovic

October 20 29	FC Tulsa	4–0	Atlanta United 2	Tulsa, Oklahoma
7pm CDT	Da Costa 17'; Johnson 21'; Garcia 23'; Marlon (yellow card) 34'; Wormell (yellow card) 70'; Coutinho 90+1'	Report	Washington (yellow card) 31'; Cobb (yellow card) 83'; McFadden (yellow card) 84'	Stadium: ONEOK Field; Attendance: 2,730; Referee: Mark Allatin

October 23 30	Indy Eleven	1–1	FC Tulsa	Indianapolis, Indiana
TBD CDT	Arteaga (yellow card) 43'; Vassell 71'; Adewole (yellow card) 77'	Report	Fenwick (yellow card) 32'; Johnson 78'	Stadium: Carroll Stadium; Attendance: 6,499; Referee: Melvin Rivas

October 27 31	Memphis 901 FC	3–2	FC Tulsa	Memphis, Tennessee
7:00 PM CDT	Fortune 24', (yellow card) 39'; Segbers 33'; Murphy 75', (yellow card) 85'; Paul (yellow card) 88'; Oduro (yellow card) 90+2'	Report	Marlon 8' (pen.); Logue 74' (o.g.)	Stadium: Autozone Park; Attendance: 3,443; Referee: Elton García

October 30 32	FC Tulsa	2–0	OKC Energy	Tulsa, Oklahoma
7pm CDT	Rivas 11'; Jadama (yellow card) 68'; Marlon 82'	Report	Chavez (yellow card) 71'	Stadium: ONEOK Field; Attendance: 4,053; Referee: Michael Radchuk

=== USL Championship Playoffs ===
November 6, 2021 Conference Quarterfinals	Tampa Bay Rowdies	6–2	FC Tulsa	Tampa Bay, FL
7:30 p.m. EDT		Report	Bird (yellow card) 63', (red card) 72'; Rivas 67'; Suárez 90'	Stadium: Al Lang Stadium; Attendance: 6,262; Referee: Sergii Demianchuk
