= 2022 USL Championship season =

12th season of the USL Championship

USL Championship
- Season: 2022
- Dates: March 12 – October 15
- Champions: San Antonio FC (1st Title)
- Regular season title: San Antonio FC (1st Title)
- Matches: 472
- Goals: 1,386 (2.94 per match)
- Best player: (Brazil) Leo Fernandes Tampa Bay Rowdies
- Top goalscorer: (United States) Milan Iloski Orange County SC (22 Goals)
- Best goalkeeper: (United States) Jordan Farr San Antonio FC
- Biggest home win: 8 goals: TBR 8–0 LDN (October 8)
- Biggest away win: 6 goals: NYR 1–7 MIA (September 9)
- Highest scoring: 9 goals: ELP 4–5 LVL (March 23); HFD 6–3 CHS (October 1)
- Longest winning run: 7 matches TBR
- Longest unbeaten run: 13 matches TBR
- Longest winless run: 16 matches NYR
- Longest losing run: 8 matches LDN
- Highest attendance: 14,673; LOU 1–0 TBR (August 13)
- Lowest attendance: 122; NYR 2–2 SDG (June 2)
- Total attendance: 1,983,922
- Average attendance: 5,061
- All statistics correct as of October 15, 2022.

Locations of teams for the 2022 USL Championship season
Western Conference Eastern Conference

The 2022 USL Championship season was the twelfth season of the USL Championship and the sixth season under Division II sanctioning. The 2022 season saw 27 teams participate in two conferences during the regular season. This was the last season to feature MLS Reserve teams.

== Teams ==
=== Changes from 2021 ===
Expansion clubs

- Detroit City FC (joined from NISA)
- Monterey Bay FC

On hiatus

- Austin Bold FC (change of ownership; dormant since then (Sept 2025))
- OKC Energy FC (no viable venue; will return in 2028 as OKC United)

Departing clubs

- Charlotte Independence (moved to USL League One)

Joined MLS Next Pro

- Real Monarchs
- Sporting Kansas City II
- Tacoma Defiance

=== Stadiums and locations ===
Team	Stadium	Capacity	MLS affiliate
Atlanta United 2	Fifth Third Bank Stadium	8,318	Atlanta United FC
Birmingham Legion FC	Protective Stadium	47,000	
Charleston Battery	Patriots Point Soccer Complex	5,000	
Colorado Springs Switchbacks FC	Weidner Field	8,000	
Detroit City FC	Keyworth Stadium	7,933	
FC Tulsa	ONEOK Field	7,833	
El Paso Locomotive FC	Southwest University Park	9,500	
Hartford Athletic	Trinity Health Stadium	5,500	
Indy Eleven	IU Michael A. Carroll Track & Soccer Stadium	10,524	
LA Galaxy II	Dignity Health Sports Park	5,000	LA Galaxy
Las Vegas Lights FC	Cashman Field	9,334	Los Angeles FC
Loudoun United FC	Segra Field	5,000	D.C. United
Louisville City FC	Lynn Family Stadium	15,304	
Memphis 901 FC	AutoZone Park	10,000	
Miami FC	Riccardo Silva Stadium	25,000	
Monterey Bay FC	Cardinale Stadium	6,000	
New Mexico United	Rio Grande Credit Union Field at Isotopes Park	13,500	
New York Red Bulls II	MSU Soccer Park at Pittser Field	5,000	New York Red Bulls
Oakland Roots SC	Laney College Football Stadium	5,500	
Orange County SC	Championship Soccer Stadium	5,000	
Phoenix Rising FC	Phoenix Rising Soccer Complex at Wild Horse Pass	10,000	
Pittsburgh Riverhounds SC	Highmark Stadium	5,000	
Rio Grande Valley FC Toros	H-E-B Park	9,400	
Sacramento Republic FC	Heart Health Park	11,569	
San Antonio FC	Toyota Field	8,296	
San Diego Loyal SC	Torero Stadium	6,000	
Tampa Bay Rowdies	Al Lang Stadium	7,227	

MLS-affiliated
MLS-owned
1. Non-soccer specific stadium.

=== Personnel and sponsorships ===
Team	Head coach	Captain	Kit manufacturer	Kit sponsor
Atlanta United 2	(Wales) Jack Collison	(Trinidad and Tobago) Ajani Fortune	Adidas	Piedmont Orthopedics
Birmingham Legion FC	(United States) Tom Soehn	(Rwanda) Phanuel Kavita	Nike	Coca-Cola
Charleston Battery	(United States) Conor Casey	(United States) Preston Kilwien	Hummel	Volvo
Colorado Springs Switchbacks FC	(United States) Brendan Burke	(United States) Jimmy Ockford	Capelli Sport	Centura Health
Detroit City FC	(England) Trevor James	(Republic of Ireland) Stephen Carroll	Adidas	Metro Detroit Area Chevrolet Dealers
El Paso Locomotive FC	(Malta) John Hutchinson	(England) Andrew Fox (Republic of Ireland) Richie Ryan (Spain) Yuma	Adidas	Southwest University at El Paso
FC Tulsa	(Jamaica) Donovan Ricketts (Interim)	(United States) Bradley Bourgeois (Brazil) Rodrigo da Costa	Puma	Williams
Hartford Athletic	(United States) Tab Ramos	(United States) Danny Barrera	Hummel	Trinity Health of New England
Indy Eleven	(England) Mark Lowry	(Spain) Ayoze (Trinidad and Tobago) Neveal Hackshaw	Puma	Honda
LA Galaxy II	(France) Yoann Damet	(Isle of Man) Liam Doyle	Adidas	Herbalife
Las Vegas Lights FC	(Spain) Enrique Duran	(United States) Daniel Crisostomo	Meyba	Coincloud
Loudoun United FC	(United States) Ryan Martin	(United States) Rio Hope-Gund	Adidas	
Louisville City FC	(United States) Danny Cruz	(United States) Paolo DelPiccolo	Adidas	GE Appliances
Memphis 901 FC	(United States) Ben Pirmann	(Trinidad and Tobago) Leston Paul	Puma	Terminix
Miami FC	(Wales) Anthony Pulis	(England) Paco Craig	Macron	Helbiz
Monterey Bay FC	(Canada) Frank Yallop	(United States) Hugh Roberts	Puma	Montage Health
New Mexico United	(United States) Zach Prince	(United States) Sam Hamilton (United States) Josh Suggs	Puma	Meow Wolf (home); New Mexico True (away)
New York Red Bulls II	(Uganda) Ibrahim Sekagya (Interim)	(United States) John Murphy (Canada) O'Vonte Mullings	Adidas	Red Bull
Oakland Roots SC	(United States) Noah Delgado (Interim)	(Montenegro) Emrah Klimenta	Puma	Elevance Health
Orange County SC	(England) Richard Chaplow	(United States) Michael Orozco	Adidas	Hoag
Phoenix Rising FC	(Venezuela) Juan Guerra	(United States) Darnell King	Adidas	Carvana
Pittsburgh Riverhounds SC	(United States) Bob Lilley	(Jamaica) Kenardo Forbes	Adidas	Allegheny Health Network (home); 84 Lumber (away)
Rio Grande Valley FC Toros	(Colombia) Wílmer Cabrera	(United States) Robert Coronado	Puma	Reliant
Sacramento Republic FC	(England) Mark Briggs	(Republic of Ireland) Lee Desmond	Nike	UCDavis Health
San Antonio FC	(Canada) Alen Marcina	(Brazil) PC	Puma	Toyota
San Diego Loyal SC	(United States) Landon Donovan	(England) Charlie Adams	Charly	Rocket League
Tampa Bay Rowdies	(Scotland) Neill Collins	(Uruguay) Sebastián Guenzatti	Puma	Seminole Hard Rock Hotel & Casino

=== Managerial changes ===
Team	Outgoing manager	Manner of departure	Date of vacancy	Incoming manager	Date of appointment
New Mexico United	(United States) Troy Lesesne	Mutual separation	November 1, 2021	(United States) Zach Prince	November 15, 2021
Charleston Battery	(United States) Michael Anhaeuser	Sacked	November 1, 2021	(United States) Conor Casey	December 20, 2021
Indy Eleven	(England) Max Rogers (interim)	End of interim period	November 16, 2021	(England) Mark Lowry	November 16, 2021
Miami FC	(Scotland) Paul Dalglish	Mutual separation	November 15, 2021	(Wales) Anthony Pulis	November 29, 2021
New York Red Bulls II	(United States) John Wolyniec	Mutual separation	December 10, 2021	(England) Gary Lewis	February 7, 2022
LA Galaxy II	(United States) Junior Gonzalez	Mutual separation	December 17, 2021	(France) Yoann Damet	January 28, 2022
Oakland Roots SC	(United States) Jordan Ferrell	Returned to Technical Director	December 30, 2021	(Venezuela) Juan Guerra	December 30, 2021
Las Vegas Lights FC	(United States) Steve Cherundolo	Signed by Los Angeles FC	January 3, 2022	(Spain) Enrique Duran	February 4, 2022
FC Tulsa	(Nigeria) Michael Nsien	Sacked	June 17, 2022	(Jamaica) Donovan Ricketts (interim)	June 17, 2022
Hartford Athletic	(England) Harry Watling	Resigned	June 25, 2022	(United States) Ray Reid (interim)	June 25, 2022
New York Red Bulls II	(England) Gary Lewis	Sacked	July 2, 2022	(Uganda) Ibrahim Sekagya (interim)	July 2, 2022
Phoenix Rising FC	(United States) Rick Schantz	Mutual separation	August 17, 2022	(Venezuela) Juan Guerra	August 22, 2022
Oakland Roots SC	(Venezuela) Juan Guerra	Signed by Phoenix Rising FC	August 18, 2022	(United States) Noah Delgado (interim)	August 18, 2022
Hartford Athletic	(United States) Ray Reid (interim)	End of interim period	August 22, 2022	(United States) Tab Ramos	August 22, 2022
Charleston Battery	(United States) Conor Casey	Mutual separation	October 12, 2022	(United States) Ben Pirmann	November 15, 2022

== Regular season ==
=== Format ===
In December 2021, it was announced that divisional play would be dropped and that there would be 2 conferences, Eastern and Western. They further announced a 34-game schedule, with each team playing their conference opponents twice, with the Eastern Conference filling out the 8 remaining games with interconference opponents. In the Western Conference, the 10 remaining games would be competed with intraconference and interconference opponents. The top 7 teams in each conference will make the playoffs, with the first place team receiving a bye in the first round.

=== Eastern Conference ===
Pos	Team	Pld	W	L	T	GF	GA	GD	Pts	Qualification
1	Louisville City FC	34	22	6	6	65	28	+37	72	Qualification for the Conference Semifinals
2	Memphis 901 FC	34	21	8	5	67	33	+34	68	Playoffs
3	Tampa Bay Rowdies	34	20	7	7	73	33	+40	67	Playoffs
4	Birmingham Legion FC	34	17	10	7	56	37	+19	58	Playoffs
5	Pittsburgh Riverhounds SC	34	16	9	9	50	38	+12	57	Playoffs
6	Miami FC	34	15	9	10	47	32	+15	55	Playoffs
7	Detroit City FC	34	14	8	12	44	30	+14	54	Playoffs
8	FC Tulsa	34	12	16	6	48	58	−10	42	
9	Indy Eleven	34	12	17	5	41	55	−14	41	
10	Hartford Athletic	34	10	18	6	47	57	−10	36	
11	Loudoun United FC	34	8	22	4	36	74	−38	28	
12	Charleston Battery	34	6	21	7	41	77	−36	25	
13	Atlanta United 2	34	6	23	5	39	85	−46	23	
14	New York Red Bulls II	34	3	25	6	24	76	−52	15	

Source: USL Championship Standings
Rules for classification: 1) head-to-head points; 2) head-to-head goal differential; 3) points-per game within conference; 4) total wins; 5) total goal differential; 6) total goals scored; 7) points earned against top four Conference finishers; 8) disciplinary points; 9) coin toss or drawing of lots

=== Western Conference ===
Pos	Team	Pld	W	L	T	GF	GA	GD	Pts	Qualification
1	San Antonio FC (C, X)	34	24	5	5	54	26	+28	77	Qualification for the Conference Semifinals
2	San Diego Loyal SC	34	18	10	6	68	55	+13	60	Playoffs
3	Colorado Springs Switchbacks	34	17	13	4	59	53	+6	55	Playoffs
4	Sacramento Republic	34	15	11	8	48	34	+14	53	Playoffs
5	New Mexico United	34	13	9	12	49	40	+9	51	Playoffs
6	Rio Grande Valley Toros	34	14	13	7	51	40	+11	49	Playoffs
7	Oakland Roots SC	34	11	10	13	51	46	+5	46	Playoffs
8	El Paso Locomotive FC	34	13	14	7	56	52	+4	46	
9	Las Vegas Lights FC	34	12	13	9	40	50	−10	45	
10	Phoenix Rising FC	34	12	16	6	50	58	−8	42	
11	LA Galaxy II	34	11	16	7	53	63	−10	40	
12	Monterey Bay FC	34	12	18	4	42	59	−17	40	
13	Orange County SC	34	7	14	13	49	59	−10	34	

Source: USL Championship Standings
Rules for classification: 1) head-to-head points; 2) head-to-head goal differential; 3) points-per game within conference; 4) total wins; 5) total goal differential; 6) total goals scored; 7) points earned against top four Conference finishers; 8) disciplinary points; 9) coin toss or drawing of lots
(C) Champions; (X) Regular Season League Champion

=== Results table ===
Color Key: Home • Away • Win • Loss • Draw
Club	Matches																																	
Club	1	2	3	4	5	6	7	8	9	10	11	12	13	14	15	16	17	18	19	20	21	22	23	24	25	26	27	28	29	30	31	32	33	34
Atlanta United 2 (ATL)	LOU	NYR	TBR	CHS	HFD	DET	IND	PGH	LOU	DET	OCO	RGV	MEM	LDN	HFD	OAK	CHS	ELP	BHM	TUL	SAN	TBR	LV	BHM	NYR	MIA	LDN	PGH	TUL	MEM	MIA	IND	LAG	PHX
Atlanta United 2 (ATL)	0–1	0–1	0–3	4–1	2–1	0–4	1–2	0–4	0–4	1–3	0–0	3–4	2–5	2–0	0–3	1–3	4–3	2–2	3–3	1–2	0–5	1–3	1–1	0–6	1–2	0–2	1–3	1–2	2–1	0–4	2–2	0–1	3–1	1–3
Birmingham Legion FC (BHM)	TBR	TUL	COS	LOU	HFD	DET	LDN	CHS	MIA	PGH	LV	NYR	PHX	MEM	NMU	LOU	ATL	CHS	SAC	TUL	LDN	HFD	ATL	SDG	DET	MEM	NYR	MIA	IND	PGH	TBR	OAK	SAN	IND
Birmingham Legion FC (BHM)	1–1	1–3	0–2	0–0	2–1	0–1	2–1	2–1	0–0	0–1	0–0	2–1	1–0	1–0	2–0	1–2	3–3	3–0	1–0	0–2	6–1	1–0	6–0	1–0	1–2	4–2	3–1	1–1	3–4	2–1	1–1	1–2	1–2	3–1
Charleston Battery (CHS)	TUL	DET	ATL	LV	SDG	LOU	BHM	MEM	NMU	MIA	LDN	IND	PGH	TBR	TUL	ATL	SAN	BHM	MIA	HFD	COS	SAC	LOU	NYR	LAG	DET	PGH	NYR	TBR	MEM	RGV	HFD	IND	LDN
Charleston Battery (CHS)	1–0	0–1	1–4	1–2	1–4	1–1	1–2	0–2	0–2	0–4	1–1	3–4	3–0	1–1	1–2	3–4	0–2	0–3	0–1	3–1	3–3	2–4	1–4	3–1	1–1	0–3	0–0	3–0	2–1	0–5	0–3	3–6	1–4	1–1
Colorado Springs Switchbacks (COS)	OCO	MB	BHM	MIA	LV	MEM	TUL	OAK	RGV	MB	LV	LAG	IND	SAN	HFD	SAC	SDG	ELP	LAG	SDG	CHS	PHX	OCO	ELP	SAC	TBR	NMU	PHX	DET	RGV	SAN	OAK	ELP	NMU
Colorado Springs Switchbacks (COS)	2–1	1–0	2–0	2–1	3–2	1–2	2–0	3–0	3–2	2–4	3–0	3–1	4–3	0–1	0–2	3–0	2–3	0–1	4–2	0–3	3–3	0–4	3–3	4–4	0–3	1–0	1–0	1–0	1–2	0–1	0–1	1–1	4–1	0–2
Detroit City FC (DET)	SAN	CHS	PGH	MEM	ATL	BHM	HFD	NYR	TUL	LDN	MIA	ATL	PGH	SAC	ELP	MEM	LV	HFD	IND	MB	NMU	TBR	OAK	BHM	LOU	CHS	IND	COS	TBR	NYR	TUL	LDN	LOU	MIA
Detroit City FC (DET)	0–1	1–0	1–1	1–1	4–0	1–0	2–1	2–0	1–3	4–2	1–1	3–1	1–1	0–2	1–1	0–2	1–0	1–1	1–0	0–0	2–2	0–1	1–1	2–1	0–1	3–0	0–0	2–1	1–0	0–0	2–2	4–0	1–2	0–1
El Paso Locomotive (ELP)	SAC	NMU	LV	SDG	MB	SAN	OAK	LDN	TUL	LAG	PGH	SAC	OCO	LV	HFD	PHX	DET	NYR	RGV	ATL	COS	OAK	SAN	LOU	MB	COS	SDG	PHX	NMU	RGV	LAG	COS	OCO	TBR
El Paso Locomotive (ELP)	1–3	1–2	4–5	2–3	5–0	0–1	1–1	3–1	3–1	4–0	0–1	1–0	2–2	1–0	1–1	1–0	1–1	5–0	0–0	2–2	1–0	0–4	0–1	0–1	0–1	4–4	1–3	3–1	2–1	0–2	3–2	1–4	2–1	1–3
Hartford Athletic (HFD)	PGH	TBR	ATL	BHM	MIA	DET	IND	LDN	NYR	PHX	ELP	SDG	MEM	ATL	LOU	COS	DET	TBR	CHS	PGH	RGV	BHM	MEM	IND	MIA	TUL	NYR	LAG	TUL	LV	LDN	CHS	OAK	LOU
Hartford Athletic (HFD)	1–2	1–1	1–2	1–2	0–2	1–2	0–1	1–0	3–2	1–2	1–1	0–3	1–1	3–0	0–2	2–0	1–1	2–3	1–3	1–2	0–0	0–1	1–3	2–1	0–2	2–1	3–3	3–1	3–2	3–0	0–3	6–3	1–3	1–2
Indy Eleven (IND)	LDN	TBR	LOU	LAG	RGV	ATL	OCO	HFD	MEM	NYR	NMU	CHS	MIA	COS	SDG	MIA	PGH	DET	NYR	MEM	TBR	PGH	HFD	TUL	SAN	LOU	DET	BHM	MB	LDN	ATL	TUL	CHS	BHM
Indy Eleven (IND)	0–1	0–2	1–1	1–1	2–1	2–1	3–1	1–0	1–2	2–0	1–2	4–3	1–1	3–4	0–5	0–1	0–1	0–1	0–1	1–1	1–3	0–2	1–2	0–1	1–0	2–1	0–0	4–3	0–5	1–0	1–0	2–4	4–1	1–3
LA Galaxy II (LA)	SD	SAN	RGV	IND	PHX	MB	LV	PHX	ELP	LOU	MEM	OAK	SDG	RGV	COS	MB	SAC	MIA	OAK	SD	COS	OCO	SAN	LDN	NMU	CHS	MB	HFD	OCO	ELP	SAC	ATL	NMU	LV
LA Galaxy II (LA)	1–2	1–2	1–0	1–1	1–3	3–1	1–1	3–0	0–4	4–3	0–5	0–1	2–2	1–0	1–3	3–2	0–2	3–1	3–1	5–0	2–4	2–5	1–1	0–2	2–2	1–1	2–0	1–3	0–1	2–3	2–0	1–3	2–3	1–1
Las Vegas Lights (LV)	NMU	PHX	ELP	MEM	CHS	COS	PGH	LAG	SAC	MB	OAK	BHM	ELP	COS	OCO	SDG	PHX	DET	RGV	OAK	SAN	ATL	PHX	SAN	OCO	SAC	RGV	TBR	HFD	SDG	MB	NMU	MIA	LAG
Las Vegas Lights (LV)	0–2	2–1	5–4	0–1	2–1	2–3	1–0	1–1	1–1	0–1	1–1	0–0	0–1	0–3	3–0	2–1	3–2	0–1	1–0	2–0	0–2	1–1	0–0	0–2	1–1	2–1	0–5	1–6	0–3	1–2	4–0	0–0	3–2	1–1
Loudoun United FC (LDN)	IND	NYR	MIA	PGH	LOU	OAK	BHM	ELP	HFD	DET	MEM	CHS	NYR	ATL	PHX	OCO	TUL	TBR	MIA	BHM	MB	LAG	SAN	ATL	TUL	MEM	PGH	SAC	LOU	HFD	IND	DET	TBR	CHS
Loudoun United FC (LDN)	1–0	3–0	0–0	0–2	0–2	1–4	1–2	1–3	0–1	2–4	0–3	1–1	1–0	0–2	4–3	1–3	2–2	1–4	1–2	1–6	0–1	2–0	1–2	3–1	1–2	1–0	1–2	0–4	2–4	3–0	0–1	0–4	0–8	1–1
Louisville City FC (LOU)	ATL	MIA	NYR	IND	BHM	LDN	SDG	CHS	PGH	ATL	LAG	MB	TUL	TBR	OCO	HFD	BHM	NYR	MEM	PHX	ELP	CHS	TBR	DET	MIA	IND	SAC	TUL	PGH	LDN	MEM	RGV	DET	HFD
Louisville City FC (LOU)	1–0	2–0	2–0	1–1	0–0	2–0	5–2	1–1	2–0	4–0	3–4	0–2	4–1	0–1	3–1	2–0	2–1	6–0	2–1	0–0	1–0	4–1	1–0	1–0	0–1	1–2	3–1	2–2	0–0	4–2	1–2	1–0	2–1	2–1
Memphis 901 FC (MEM)	PGH	OAK	LV	DET	COS	TBR	MIA	CHS	IND	LAG	LDN	ATL	BHM	HFD	TUL	DET	TBR	PHX	LOU	IND	NYR	HFD	PGH	NMU	BHM	LDN	OCO	ATL	CHS	LOU	MIA	RGV	NYR	TUL
Memphis 901 FC (MEM)	0–3	2–1	1–0	1–1	2–1	3–1	1–2	2–0	2–1	5–0	3–0	5–2	0–1	1–1	2–0	2–0	0–2	3–1	1–2	1–1	2–1	3–1	2–0	2–0	2–4	0–1	1–1	5–0	5–0	2–1	0–1	2–2	2–1	3–0
Miami FC (MIA)	NYR	LOU	LDN	COS	TBR	HFD	PHX	MEM	BHM	SAN	DET	CHS	PGH	TUL	IND	TBR	LAG	IND	PGH	CHS	OCO	LDN	NMU	TUL	ATL	HFD	LOU	BHM	NYR	ATL	MB	MEM	LV	DET
Miami FC (MIA)	2–0	0–2	0–0	1–2	1–0	2–0	1–2	2–1	0–0	0–2	1–1	4–0	2–2	0–0	1–1	1–2	1–3	1–0	1–4	1–0	0–0	2–1	3–0	1–2	2–0	2–0	1–0	1–1	7–1	2–2	0–0	1–0	2–3	1–0
Monterey Bay FC (MB)	PHX	COS	OAK	SAC	ELP	LAG	SAN	LV	RGV	LOU	COS	OAK	SAN	LAG	SAC	NMU	OCO	DET	NYR	LDN	ELP	SDG	SAC	NMU	LAG	SDG	OCO	IND	PHX	MIA	LV	TBR	TUL	RGV
Monterey Bay FC (MB)	2–4	0–1	3–2	1–2	0–5	1–3	0–6	1–0	1–2	2–0	4–2	0–2	2–3	2–3	1–2	1–1	2–0	0–0	2–0	1–0	1–0	0–1	1–0	0–2	0–2	3–1	1–0	5–0	3–3	0–0	0–4	1–2	0–2	1–4
New Mexico United (NMU)	LV	ELP	OCO	OAK	PHX	SAN	SAC	SDG	CHS	PHX	IND	OCO	OAK	BHM	MB	RGV	RGV	TUL	PGH	DET	NYR	SAC	MIA	LAG	MEM	MB	COS	ELP	RGV	SAN	LV	SDG	LAG	COS
New Mexico United (NMU)	2–0	2–1	1–1	2–2	0–1	0–1	0–0	1–1	2–0	7–0	2–1	2–1	2–1	0–2	1–1	1–0	1–1	2–1	1–1	2–2	2–1	1–2	0–3	2–2	0–2	2–0	0–1	1–2	1–3	1–1	0–0	3–3	3–2	2–0
New York Red Bulls II (NYR)	MIA	ATL	LDN	LOU	TUL	RGV	TBR	DET	SAC	HFD	IND	BHM	SDG	LDN	TUL	ELP	PGH	LOU	IND	MB	NMU	MEM	ATL	CHS	PGH	BHM	HFD	CHS	MIA	OAK	DET	PHX	MEM	TBR
New York Red Bulls II (NYR)	0–2	1–0	0–3	0–2	2–3	0–1	1–1	0–2	0–1	2–3	0–2	1–2	2–2	0–1	0–0	0–5	0–3	0–6	1–0	0–2	1–2	1–2	2–1	1–3	2–2	1–3	3–3	0–3	1–7	0–1	0–0	1–5	1–2	0–1
Oakland Roots SC (OAK)	RGV	MEM	MB	NMU	TBR	SDG	LDN	ELP	COS	OCO	LV	LAG	SAC	OCO	MB	RGV	NMU	SAN	ATL	LAG	SAC	ELP	LV	PHX	DET	SDG	SAC	SAN	PHX	NYR	COS	BHM	HAR	PGH
Oakland Roots SC (OAK)	0–1	1–2	2–3	2–2	0–0	2–2	4–1	1–1	0–3	2–2	1–1	1–0	1–1	3–2	2–0	2–2	1–2	1–1	3–1	1–3	3–3	4–0	0–2	0–0	1–1	3–1	0–1	0–2	2–0	1–0	1–1	2–1	3–1	1–3
Orange County SC (OCO)	COS	RGV	NMU	SAN	SAC	IND	RGV	OAK	TUL	ELP	ATL	OAK	NMU	LV	LOU	LDN	SDG	PHX	MB	MIA	LAG	SDG	COS	PHX	LV	TBR	MEM	MB	LAG	SAC	PGH	SDG	ELP	SAN
Orange County SC (OCO)	1–2	2–1	1–1	0–1	1–1	1–3	2–1	2–2	5–1	2–2	0–0	2–3	1–2	0–3	1–3	3–1	1–2	2–2	0–2	0–0	5–2	2–3	3–3	2–1	1–1	1–3	1–1	0–1	1–0	0–4	1–1	2–2	1–2	2–2
Phoenix Rising FC (PHX)	MB	LV	SDG	SAN	LAG	NMU	MIA	LAG	SAN	TBR	NMU	HFD	BHM	ELP	LDN	LV	OCO	MEM	LOU	SAC	OAK	COS	LV	OCO	ELP	RGV	COS	OAK	SDG	MB	SAC	NYR	RGV	ATL
Phoenix Rising FC (PHX)	4–2	1–2	2–3	2–0	3–1	1–0	2–1	0–3	3–0	1–5	0–7	2–1	0–1	0–1	3–4	2–3	2–2	1–3	0–0	0–0	0–0	4–0	0–0	1–2	1–3	2–1	0–1	0–2	0–3	3–3	1–0	5–1	1–2	3–1
Pittsburgh Riverhounds (PGH)	MEM	HFD	DET	LDN	TUL	LV	ATL	LOU	BHM	ELP	TBR	MIA	DET	CHS	RGV	TBR	NYR	IND	MIA	NMU	HFD	TUL	IND	MEM	NYR	ATL	CHS	LDN	LOU	BHM	OCO	SAN	SAC	OAK
Pittsburgh Riverhounds (PGH)	3–0	2–1	1–1	2–0	4–3	0–1	4–0	0–2	1–0	1–0	1–3	2–2	1–1	0–3	0–1	2–5	3–0	1–0	4–1	1–1	2–1	1–0	2–0	0–2	2–2	2–1	0–0	2–1	0–0	1–2	1–1	0–1	1–1	3–1
Rio Grande Valley Toros (RGV)	OAK	OCO	LAG	SAN	IND	NYR	SAC	OCO	COS	MB	SDG	SAN	ATL	LAG	OAK	PGH	ELP	NMU	NMU	LV	SDG	HFD	SAC	SAN	LV	PHX	ELP	NMU	COS	CHS	LOU	MEM	PHX	MB
Rio Grande Valley Toros (RGV)	1–0	1–2	0–1	1–2	1–2	1–0	2–1	1–2	2–3	2–1	2–1	2–3	4–3	0–1	2–2	1–0	0–0	0–1	1–1	0–1	1–2	0–0	1–1	2–2	5–0	1–2	2–0	3–1	1–0	3–0	0–1	2–2	2–1	4–1
Sacramento Republic (SAC)	ELP	SDG	TUL	MB	OCO	RGV	LV	NMU	NYR	ELP	OAK	SAN	DET	LAG	MB	COS	OAK	BHM	PHX	CHS	NMU	RGV	MB	COS	LV	OAK	LOU	LDN	OCO	SAN	PHX	LAG	PGH	SDG
Sacramento Republic (SAC)	3–1	0–2	2–1	2–1	1–1	1–2	1–1	0–0	1–0	0–1	1–1	1–0	2–0	2–0	2–1	0–3	3–3	0–1	0–0	4–2	2–1	1–1	0–1	3–0	1–2	1–0	1–3	4–0	4–0	0–1	0–1	0–2	1–1	4–0
San Antonio FC (SAN)	DET	LAG	RGV	PHX	OCO	ELP	NMU	MB	PHX	MIA	RGV	SAC	MB	OAK	COS	TUL	CHS	ATL	ELP	LV	LAG	SDG	LDN	LV	RGV	IND	OAK	SDG	NMU	COS	SAC	PGH	BHM	OCO
San Antonio FC (SAN)	1–0	2–1	2–1	0–2	1–0	1–0	1–0	6–0	0–3	2–0	3–2	0–1	3–2	1–1	1–0	2–1	2–0	5–0	1–0	2–0	1–1	0–3	2–1	2–0	2–2	0–1	2–0	1–0	1–1	1–0	1–0	1–0	2–1	2–2
San Diego Loyal (SDG)	LAG	SAC	TUL	PHX	ELP	CHS	OAK	LOU	TBR	NMU	RGV	LAG	NYR	HFD	LV	IND	OCO	COS	LAG	COS	RGV	OCO	SAN	MB	BHM	ELP	OAK	MB	SAN	PHX	LV	OCO	NMU	SAC
San Diego Loyal (SDG)	2–1	2–0	0–1	3–2	3–2	4–1	2–2	2–5	3–2	1–1	1–2	2–2	2–2	3–0	1–2	5–0	2–1	3–2	0–5	3–0	2–1	3–2	3–0	1–0	0–1	3–1	1–3	1–3	0–1	3–0	2–1	2–2	3–3	0–4
Tampa Bay Rowdies (TBR)	BHM	IND	ATL	HFD	OAK	MIA	TUL	NYR	MEM	SDG	PHX	PGH	TUL	LOU	MIA	CHS	PGH	MEM	HFD	LDN	ATL	IND	DET	LOU	COS	OCO	LV	CHS	DET	BHM	MB	LDN	ELP	NYR
Tampa Bay Rowdies (TBR)	1–1	2–0	3–0	1–1	0–0	0–1	3–1	1–1	1–3	2–3	5–1	3–1	1–1	1–0	2–1	1–1	5–2	2–0	3–2	4–1	3–1	3–1	1–0	0–1	0–1	3–1	6–1	1–2	0–1	1–1	2–1	8–0	3–1	1–0
FC Tulsa (TUL)	CHS	BHM	SDG	SAC	NYR	PGH	TBR	COS	ELP	DET	OCO	LOU	TBR	MIA	NYR	MEM	CHS	SAN	LDN	ATL	NMU	BHM	PGH	MIA	IND	HFD	LDN	ATL	LOU	HFD	DET	IND	MB	MEM
FC Tulsa (TUL)	0–1	3–1	1–0	1–2	3–2	3–4	1–3	0–2	1–3	3–1	1–5	1–4	1–1	0–0	0–0	0–2	2–1	1–2	2–2	2–1	1–2	2–0	0–1	2–1	1–0	1–2	2–1	1–2	2–2	2–3	2–2	4–2	2–0	0–3

== Playoffs ==
=== Bracket ===
Conference Quarterfinals; October 22–23	Conference Semifinals; October 28–30
E1	Louisville City FC (p)	2 (5)
E5	Pittsburgh Riverhounds SC	2 (3)
E4	Birmingham Legion FC	2 (7)
E5	Pittsburgh Riverhounds SC (p)	2 (8)
Eastern Conference
E2	Memphis 901 FC	3
E7	Detroit City FC	1
E2	Memphis 901 FC	0
E3	Tampa Bay Rowdies	1
E3	Tampa Bay Rowdies	3
E6	Miami FC	1
W1	San Antonio FC	3
W7	Oakland Roots SC	0
W2	San Diego Loyal SC	0
W7	Oakland Roots SC	3
Western Conference
W3	Colorado Springs Switchbacks FC	3
W6	Rio Grande Valley FC	0
W3	Colorado Springs Switchbacks FC (a.e.t.)	2
W4	Sacramento Republic FC	1
W4	Sacramento Republic FC	2
W5	New Mexico United	0

Conference Finals; November 5–6
E1	Louisville City FC (a.e.t.)	1
E3	Tampa Bay Rowdies	0
W1	San Antonio FC	2
W3	Colorado Springs Switchbacks FC	0

USL Championship Final; November 13
E1	Louisville City FC	1
W1	San Antonio FC	3

=== Conference Quarter-finals ===
October 22 East	Tampa Bay Rowdies	3–1	Miami FC	St. Petersburg, Florida
7:30 PM EDT	Antley (yellow card) 30'; Guenzatti 50', 70'; Law 59'	Report	Chapman-Page (yellow card) 39'; Rivas 55'; Ballard (yellow card) 84'	Stadium: Al Lang Stadium; Attendance: 5,937; Referee: Calin Radosav

October 22 East	Memphis 901 FC	3–1	Detroit City FC	Memphis, Tennessee
8:00 PM CDT	Buckmaster (yellow card) 51'; Allan 72'; Smith 88'; Goodrum 90+4' (yellow card) 90+5'	Report	Rodriguez (yellow card) 10'; Bryant (yellow card) 75'; Matthews 77'; Lewis (yellow card) 85'	Stadium: AutoZone Park; Attendance: 6,010; Referee: Elijio Arreguin

October 22 West	Colorado Springs Switchbacks FC	3–0	Rio Grande Valley FC	Colorado Springs, Colorado
6:30 PM MDT	Amoh (yellow card) 29'; Henríquez 84'; Wheeler 90', 90+4'	Report	Ricketts (yellow card) 23'	Stadium: Weidner Field; Attendance: 7,036; Referee: Mark Allatin

October 22 West	Sacramento Republic FC	2–0	New Mexico United	Sacramento, California
7:00 PM PDT	López (yellow card) 27'; Foster 47'; Keko 74'	Report	Yearwood (yellow card) 16'; Moreno (yellow card) 42'	Stadium: Heart Health Park; Attendance: 11,569; Referee: Elvis Osmanovic

October 23 East	Birmingham Legion FC	2–2 (a.e.t.) (7–8 p)	Pittsburgh Riverhounds SC	Birmingham, Alabama
6:00 PM EDT	Kasim 72'; Lapa 99' (yellow card) 100'	Report	Wiedt (yellow card) 57'; Kizza 90', 116' (yellow card) 120+9'	Stadium: Protective Stadium; Attendance: 10,227; Referee: Eric Tattersall
	Penalties
	Crognale (penalty missed); Lapa (penalty missed); Dean (penalty scored); James (penalty scored); Martinez (penalty scored); Balarabe (penalty scored); Rufe (penalty scored); Lopez (penalty scored); Kavita (penalty scored); Dupont (penalty missed)		(penalty scored) Sims; (penalty scored) Griffin; (penalty scored) Dikwa; (penalty missed) Cicerone; (penalty missed) Eyang; (penalty scored) Ybarra; (penalty scored) Ordoñez; (penalty scored) Kelly; (penalty scored) Peters; (penalty scored) Kizza

October 23 West	San Diego Loyal SC	0–3	Oakland Roots SC	San Diego, California
5:30 PM PDT	Guido (yellow card) 6' (yellow-red card) 79'; Amang (yellow card) 76' (yellow-red card) 76'; Stoneman (yellow card) 84' (yellow-red card) 88'; Fissore (yellow card) 86'	Report	Nane (yellow card) 15'; Martin (yellow card) 26'; Dennis 36'; Mfeka 53'; Hernández (yellow card) 76'; Barbir (yellow card) 78'; Fissore 90+1'; Klimenta (yellow card) 87'	Stadium: Torero Stadium; Attendance: 5,719; Referee: Elton Garcia

=== Conference Semi-finals ===
October 28 West	San Antonio FC	3–0	Oakland Roots SC	San Antonio, Texas
7:30 PM CDT	Adeniran 2'; Khmiri (yellow card) 20'; Garcia (yellow card) 56'; Patiño 75', 90'	Report	Barbir (yellow card) 52'; Rodriguez (yellow card) 76'; Rito (yellow card) 89'; Hernández (yellow card) 89'	Stadium: Toyota Field; Attendance: 8,208; Referee: Elvis Osmanovic

October 29 East	Louisville City FC	2–2 (a.e.t.) (5–3 p)	Pittsburgh Riverhounds SC	Louisville, Kentucky
7:30 PM EDT	Wynder (yellow card) 62'; Perez 83' (yellow card) 88'; Lancaster 85' (pen.); Dia (yellow card) 115'	Report	Cicerone 14', 47' (yellow card) 103'; Rovira (yellow card) 45+2'; Williams (yellow card) 54'; Wiedt (yellow card) 84'; Dikwa (yellow card) 90+4'	Stadium: Lynn Family Stadium; Attendance: 8,509; Referee: Elijio Arreguin
	Penalties
	Totsch (penalty scored); Wynder (penalty scored); Jimenez (penalty scored); Matsoso (penalty scored); Moguel (penalty scored)		(penalty missed) Griffin; (penalty scored) Forbes; (penalty scored) Sims; (penalty scored) Dikwa

October 29 West	Colorado Springs Switchbacks FC	2–1 (a.e.t.)	Sacramento Republic FC	Colorado Springs, Colorado
6:00 PM MDT	Ngalina 37', 96'; Wheeler (yellow card) 106'; Caldwell (yellow card) 114'; Anderson (yellow card) 120+2'	Report	Lopez 18'; LaGrassa (yellow card) 39'; Gurr (yellow card) 45+2'; Casey (yellow card) 65'; Martínez (yellow card) 66'; Archimède (yellow card) 120+2'	Stadium: Weidner Field; Attendance: 7,075; Referee: Sergii Demianchuk

October 30 East	Memphis 901 FC	0–1	Tampa Bay Rowdies	Memphis, Tennessee
3:00 PM CDT	Goodrum (yellow card) 51'; Kiddiedou (yellow card) 90+7'; Paul (yellow card) 90+10'	Report	Guillén (yellow card) 29'; Dalgaard (yellow card) 74'; Guenzatti (yellow card) 80'; Scarlett (yellow card) 90+3'; Hilton (yellow card) 90+8'; Fernandes 90+9' (pen.)	Stadium: AutoZone Park; Attendance: 6,063; Referee: Elton Garcia
Note: Match rescheduled from October 29 due to weather.

=== Conference Finals ===
November 5 East	Louisville City FC	1–0 (a.e.t.)	Tampa Bay Rowdies	Louisville, Kentucky
7:30 PM EDT	Totsch (yellow card) 48'; Bone (red card) 82'; Charpie (yellow card) 100'; Wynder 108'	Report	Hilton (yellow card) 84'; Harris (yellow card) 90+3'; Dos Santos (yellow card) 106'	Stadium: Lynn Family Stadium; Attendance: 11,563; Referee: Mark Allatin

November 6 West	San Antonio FC	2–0	Colorado Springs Switchbacks FC	San Antonio, Texas
7:30 PM CST	Maloney 23'; Parano (yellow card) 66'; Adeniran (yellow card) 75'; Patiño (yellow card) 90+2' (goal) 90+11'	Report	Ngalina (yellow card) 10'; Hodge (yellow card) 49'; Henriquez (yellow card) 54'; Wheeler (yellow card) 78'; Herrera (yellow card) 87'; Mahoney (yellow card) 89'	Stadium: Toyota Field; Attendance: 8,245; Referee: Kevin Broadley

=== USL Championship Final ===
November 13	San Antonio FC	3–1	Louisville City FC	San Antonio, Texas
7:30 PM CST	Patiño 45+3' (pen.), 70'; Garcia (yellow card) 47'; Delem (yellow card) 62'; Adeniran 64'	Report	Lancaster (yellow card) 44'; Faundez (yellow card) 61'; Ownby 78'; Mushagalusa (yellow card) 80'	Stadium: Toyota Field; Attendance: 8,534; Referee: Lukasz Szpala

Championship Game MVP: (Colombia) Santiago Patiño (SAN)

== Average home attendances ==
Ranked from highest to lowest average attendance.

Team	GP	Total	High	Low	Average
New Mexico United	17^{1}	169,870	14,519	7,414	10,617
Louisville City FC	17	177,901	14,673	8,318	10,465
Sacramento Republic FC	17	167,890	11,569	7,835	9,876
Indy Eleven	17	140,849	10,272	4,695	8,285
Phoenix Rising FC	17 ^{5}	86,697	8,615	5,425	7,225
Colorado Springs Switchbacks FC	17	122,389	8,023	5,036	7,199
El Paso Locomotive FC	17^{2}	97,760	8,124	5,077	6,517
Detroit City FC	17	104,012	7,537	4,157	6,118
San Antonio FC	17	101,668	8,015	4,297	5,980
Birmingham Legion FC	17^{13}	23,681	9,277	4,207	5,920
Las Vegas Lights FC	17^{9}	33,474	8,052	1,011	4,184
Hartford Athletic	17^{1}	82,615	5,500	4,628	5,163
Tampa Bay Rowdies	17	87,508	6,714	3,454	5,148
San Diego Loyal SC	17^{2}	68,007	5,621	3,400	4,534
Oakland Roots SC	17	73,780	5,509	3,092	4,340
Orange County SC	17	68,875	5,425	5	4,051
Rio Grande Valley FC	17	68,837	5,333	2,519	4,049
FC Tulsa	17	68,742	5,392	2,851	4,044
Pittsburgh Riverhounds SC	17	66,874	5,202	2,203	3,934
Monterey Bay FC	17	62,285	5,705	2,723	3,664
Memphis 901 FC	17	61,771	6,073	2,431	3,634
Charleston Battery	17	47,557	4,325	1,849	2,797
Loudoun United FC	17	26,905	2,496	1,031	1,583
Miami FC	17	19,446	1,492	752	1,144
Atlanta United 2	17	9,479	749	339	558
New York Red Bulls II	17^{2}	5,752	794	122	383
LA Galaxy II	17^{15}	650	500	150	325
Total	459	2,045,274	14,673	150	5,001

Notes

^{1} One result missing
^{2} Two results missing
^{5} Five results missing
^{9} Nine results missing
^{13} Thirteen results missing ^{15} Fifteen results missing
Updated to games of April 16, 2022.
Sources: USL Championship & Soccer Stadium Digest

== Regular season statistical leaders ==
As of October 15, 2022

=== Top scorers ===
Rank	Player	Club	Goals
1	(United States) Milan Iloski	Orange County SC	22
2	(United States) Phillip Goodrum	Memphis 901 FC	21
3	(Brazil) Leo Fernandes	Tampa Bay Rowdies	19
3	(Iceland) Óttar Magnús Karlsson	Oakland Roots SC	19
5	(Guinea) Hadji Barry	Colorado Springs Switchbacks	16
5	(Argentina) Luis Solignac	El Paso Locomotive	16
5	(Sierra Leone) Augustine Williams	Charleston Battery	16
8	(United States) Wilson Harris	Louisville City FC	15
8	(Uruguay) Enzo Martinez	Birmingham Legion FC	15
10	(Mexico) Danny Trejo	Las Vegas Lights	14
10	(Northern Ireland) Kyle Vassell	San Diego Loyal	14

=== Hat-tricks ===
Player	Club	Against	Result	Date
(United States) Jackson Conway	Atlanta United 2	Charleston Battery	4–1 (H)	March 27
(United States) Milan Iloski	Orange County SC	FC Tulsa	5–1 (H)	May 13
(Venezuela) Manuel Arteaga	Indy Eleven	Charleston Battery	4–3 (A)	June 4
(United States) Preston Judd	LA Galaxy II	Monterey Bay FC	3–2 (H)	June 15
(Democratic Republic of the Congo) Enoch Mushagalusa	Louisville City FC	New York Red Bulls II	6–0 (H)	July 9
(Brazil) Bruno Lapa	Birmingham Legion FC	Loudoun United FC	6–1 (H)	July 27
(United States) Phillip Goodrum	Memphis 901 FC	Atlanta United 2	4–0 (A)	September 7
(United States) Maxi Rodriguez	Detroit City FC	Loudoun United FC	4–0 (A)	October 1
(Jamaica) Andre Lewis	Hartford Athletic	Charleston Battery	6–3 (H)	October 1
(United States) Luca Sowinski	FC Tulsa	Indy Eleven	4–2 (A)	October 1
(Democratic Republic of the Congo) Michee Ngalina	Colorado Springs Switchbacks	El Paso Locomotive	4–1 (A)	October 5

Notes

(H) – Home team
(A) – Away team

=== Top assists ===
Rank	Player	Club	Assists
1	(France) Antoine Hoppenot	Detroit City FC	11
2	(Jamaica) Kenardo Forbes	Pittsburgh Riverhounds SC	10
2	(Republic of Ireland) Aaron Molloy	Memphis 901 FC	10
4	(Guinea) Hadji Barry	Colorado Springs Switchbacks	9
4	(Brazil) Leo Fernandes	Tampa Bay Rowdies	9
4	(United States) Jeremy Kelly	Memphis 901 FC	9
4	(United States) Cameron Lindley	Colorado Springs Switchbacks	9
4	(United States) Robbie Mertz	Pittsburgh Riverhounds SC	9
9	(England) Charlie Adams	San Diego Loyal	8
9	(United States) Justin Dhillon	San Antonio FC	8
9	(United States) Amadou Dia	Louisville City FC	8
9	(United States) Rodrigo López	Sacramento Republic FC	8
9	(Uruguay) Enzo Martinez	Birmingham Legion FC	8
9	(Democratic Republic of the Congo) Michee Ngalina	Colorado Springs Switchbacks	8
9	(Liberia) Prince Saydee	Hartford Athletic	8
9	(France) Florian Valot	Miami FC	8

=== Clean sheets ===
Rank	Player	Club	Clean sheets
1	(United States) Jordan Farr	San Antonio FC	15
2	(United States) Kyle Morton	Louisville City FC	13
3	(United States) Connor Sparrow	Miami FC	12
3	(United States) Nate Steinwascher	Detroit City FC	12
5	(United States) Matt Van Oekel	Birmingham Legion FC	11
6	(United States) Jeff Caldwell	Colorado Springs Switchbacks	9
6	(Germany) Ben Lundt	Phoenix Rising FC	9
8	(United States) Trey Muse	Memphis 901 FC	8
8	(United States) Evan Newton	El Paso Locomotive	8
8	(Cameroon) Antony Siaha	Monterey Bay FC	8

== League awards ==
=== Individual awards ===
Award	Winner	Team	Reason	Ref.
Golden Boot	(United States) Milan Iloski	Orange County SC	22 goals in 31 games	
Golden Glove	(United States) Kyle Morton	Louisville City FC	13 shutouts; 0.74 goals against average	
Assists Champion	(France) Antoine Hoppenot	Detroit City FC	11 assists	
Goalkeeper of the Year	(United States) Jordan Farr	San Antonio FC	15 shutouts (tied the league record)	
Defender of the Year	(United States) Mitchell Taintor	San Antonio FC	61.6 percent duel success rate	
Coach of the Year	(United States) Ben Pirmann	Memphis 901 FC	Led Memphis to their best record	
Young Player of the Year	(Democratic Republic of the Congo) Michee Ngalina	Colorado Springs Switchbacks	12 goals; 8 assists	
Most Valuable Player	(Brazil) Leo Fernandes	Tampa Bay Rowdies	19 goals; 9 assists	
Comeback Player of the Year	(United States) Elijah Wynder	Louisville City FC	Came back from a season-ending injury in 2021	
Goal of the Year	(United States) Illia Tyrkus	New York Red Bulls II	vs Hartford Athletic	
Save of the Year	(Greece) Alex Tambakis	New Mexico United	vs Charleston Battery	

=== All-league teams ===
First team
Goalkeeper	Defenders	Midfielders	Forwards
(United States) Jordan Farr (SAN)	(Mexico) Aarón Guillén (TBR) (Venezuela) Edgardo Rito (OAK) (United States) Mitchell Taintor (SAN) (United States) Sean Totsch (LOU)	(Uruguay) Enzo Martínez (BHM) (Republic of Ireland) Aaron Molloy (MEM) (United States) Rodrigo López (SAC)	(Brazil) Leo Fernandes (TBR) (United States) Phillip Goodrum (MEM) (United States) Milan Iloski (OCO)

Second team
Goalkeeper	Defenders	Midfielders	Forwards
(United States) Kyle Morton (LOU)	(Ghana) Wahab Ackwei (RGV) (England) Paco Craig (MIA) (United States) Jonathan Dean (BHM) (United States) Graham Smith (MEM)	(United States) Alejandro Guido (SDG) (United States) Cameron Lindley (COS) (Jamaica) Kenardo Forbes (PGH)	(Guinea) Hadji Barry (COS) (Iceland) Ottar Magnus Karlsson (OAK) (Sierra Leone) Augustine Williams (CHS)

=== Monthly awards ===
Month	Player of the Month			Goal of the Month			Save of the Month		Coach of the Month		References
Month	Player	Club	Position	Player	Club	Position	Player	Club	Coach	Club	References
March	(Mexico) Danny Trejo	Las Vegas Lights	Forward	(Jamaica) Neco Brett	New Mexico United	Forward	(United States) Nate Steinwascher	Detroit City FC	(United States) Brendan Burke	Colorado Springs Switchbacks	
April	(United States) Jordan Farr	San Antonio FC	Goalkeeper	(Venezuela) Luis Manuel Seijas	Phoenix Rising FC	Midfielder	(United States) Joe Rice	Loudoun United FC	(England) Trevor James	Detroit City FC	
May	(United States) Jeremy Kelly	Memphis 901 FC	Midfielder	(United States) Illia Tyrkus	New York Red Bulls II	Forward	(Greece) Alex Tabakis	New Mexico United	(United States) Ben Pirmann	Memphis 901 FC	
June	(Brazil) Leo Fernandes	Tampa Bay Rowdies	Midfielder	(Democratic Republic of the Congo) Michee Ngalina	Colorado Springs Switchbacks	Forward	(Greece) Alex Tabakis	New Mexico United	(England) Mark Briggs	Sacramento Republic FC	
July	(United States) Milan Iloski	Orange County SC	Forward	(United States) Luis Felipe Fernandes	Sacramento Republic FC	Midfielder	(Greece) Alex Tabakis	New Mexico United	(Scotland) Neill Collins	Tampa Bay Rowdies	
August	(United States) Rodrigo Lopez	Sacramento Republic FC	Midfielder	(United States) Nicky Hernandez	San Antonio FC	Midfielder	(France) Hugo Fauroux	Charleston Battery	(United States) Tom Soehn	Birmingham Legion FC	
September	(United States) Jordan Farr	San Antonio FC	Goalkeeper	(Brazil) Leo Fernandes	Tampa Bay Rowdies	Midfielder	(United States) Carlos Saldaña	Sacramento Republic FC	(Colombia) Wilmer Cabrera	Rio Grande Valley FC	

=== Weekly awards ===
Player of the Week
Week	Player	Club	Position	Reason	Ref.
1	(Jamaica) Dane Kelly	Pittsburgh Riverhounds SC	Forward	100th regular season goal	
2	(Mexico) Danny Trejo	Las Vegas Lights FC	Forward	Goal and assist vs Phoenix	
3	(United States) Jackson Conway	Atlanta United 2	Forward	Hat trick vs Charleston	
4	(Mexico) Danny Trejo	Las Vegas Lights FC	Forward	Two goals vs Charleston	
5	(Cameroon) Albert Dikwa	Pittsburgh Riverhounds SC	Forward	Two goals, one assist vs Tulsa	
6	(Germany) Ben Lundt	Phoenix Rising FC	Goalkeeper	Penalty kick save vs New Mexico	
7	(Uruguay) Enzo Martinez	Birmingham Legion FC	Forward	Goal and assist vs Loudoun	
8	(Ghana) Prosper Kasim	Birmingham Legion FC	Midfielder	Two goals vs Charleston	
9	(Argentina) Luis Solignac	El Paso Locomotive	Forward	Three goals in two games	
10	(United States) Milan Iloski	Orange County SC	Forward	Hat trick vs Tulsa	
11	(United States) Phillip Goodrum	Memphis 901 FC	Forward	Two goals, two assists	
12	(United States) Justin Portillo	New Mexico United	Midfielder	Three goals, one assist	
13	(Venezuela) Manuel Arteaga	Indy Eleven	Forward	Hat trick vs Charleston	
14	(Brazil) Raimar	Atlanta United 2	Midfielder	Two goals vs Loudoun United	
15	(United States) Preston Judd	LA Galaxy II	Forward	Hat trick vs Monterey Bay	
16	(Jamaica) Maalique Foster	Sacramento Republic FC	Forward	Two goals vs Monterey Bay	
17	(United States) Tristan Trager	Atlanta United 2	Forward	Four goals in two games	
18	(Democratic Republic of the Congo) Enoch Mushagalusa	Louisville City FC	Forward	Hat trick vs Red Bulls II	
19	(Mexico) Abraham Romero	Las Vegas Lights FC	Goalkeeper	8 save shutouts vs Rio Grande Valley	
20	(United States) Milan Iloski	Orange County SC	Forward	2 goals; 2 assists vs LA Galaxy II	
21	(Brazil) Bruno Lapa	Birmingham Legion FC	Midfielder	Hat Trick vs Loudoun United	
22	(United States) Rodrigo López	Sacramento Republic FC	Midfielder	1 goal; 2 assists in 2 games	
23	(Argentina) Luis Solignac	El Paso Locomotive FC	Forward	2 goals; 1 assist vs Colorado Springs	
24	(United States) Austin Wormell	FC Tulsa	Goalkeeper	7 save shutout vs Indy Eleven	
25	(United States) Paul Blanchette	Oakland Roots SC	Goalkeeper	13 saves in two games	
26	(Brazil) Stefano Pinho	Indy Eleven	Forward	2 goals vs Louisville	
27	(United States) Phillip Goodrum	Memphis 901 FC	Forward	Hat Trick vs Atlanta	
28	(Uruguay) Enzo Martinez	Birmingham Legion FC	Midfielder	1 goal; 1 assist vs Pittsburgh	
29	(United States) Christian Pinzón	Rio Grande Valley FC	Midfielder	2 goal vs Charleston	
30	(United States) Maxi Rodriguez	Detroit City FC	Midfielder	Hat Trick vs Loudoun	
31	(Democratic Republic of the Congo) Michee Ngalina	Colorado Springs Switchbacks	Forward	Hat Trick vs El Paso	
32	(United States) Harry Swartz	New Mexico United	Midfielder	2 goals vs LA Galaxy II	

Goal of the Week
Week	Player	Club	Opponent	Ref.
1	(United States) Harry Swartz	New Mexico United	Las Vegas Lights FC	
2	(Jamaica) Neco Brett	New Mexico United	El Paso Locomotive FC	
3	(Mexico) Danny Trejo	Las Vegas Lights FC	El Paso Locomotive FC	
4	(Mexico) Pato Botello Faz	Detroit City FC	Memphis 901 FC	
5	(United States) Diego Luna	El Paso Locomotive	Monterey Bay FC	
6	(New Zealand) Elliot Collier	San Antonio FC	El Paso Locomotive	
7	(Venezuela) Luis Manuel Seijas	Phoenix Rising FC	Miami FC	
8	(United States) Nick Moon	San Diego Loyal SC	Tampa Bay Rowdies	
9	(Scotland) Greg Hurst	Phoenix Rising FC	San Antonio FC	
10	(United States) Illia Tyrkus	New York Red Bulls II	Hartford Athletic	
11	(Zimbabwe) Lucky Mkosana	Tampa Bay Rowdies	Pittsburgh Riverhounds SC	
12	(United States) Chase Boone	Monterey Bay FC	Colorado Springs Switchbacks	
13	(United States) Robbie Mertz	Atlanta United 2	Rio Grande Valley FC	
14	(Spain) Damià Viader	Sacramento Republic FC	Detroit City FC	
15	(Brazil) Leo Fernandes	Tampa Bay Rowdies	Charleston Battery	
16	(Brazil) Leo Fernandes	Tampa Bay Rowdies	Pittsburgh Riverhounds SC	
17	(Cuba) Geobel Pérez	Charleston Battery	Atlanta United 2	
18	(United States) Luis Felipe Fernandes	Sacramento Republic FC	Oakland Roots SC	
19	(United States) Brian Ownby	Louisville City FC	Memphis 901 FC	
20	(Grenada) AJ Paterson	Charleston Battery	Colorado Springs Switchbacks	
21	(United States) Aodhan Quinn	Phoenix Rising FC	Colorado Springs Switchbacks	
22	(United States) Nighte Pickering	Memphis 901 FC	Hartford Athletic	
23	(United States) Nicky Hernandez	San Antonio FC	Las Vegas Lights FC	
24	(United States) Connor Rutz	Detroit City FC	Birmingham Legion FC	
25	(United States) Christian Pinzón	Rio Grande Valley FC	Las Vegas Lights FC	
26	(Brazil) Leo Fernandes	Tampa Bay Rowdies	Las Vegas Lights FC	
27	(England) Jack Gurr	Sacramento Republic FC	Loudoun United FC	
28	(Jamaica) Maalique Foster	Sacramento Republic FC	Orange County SC	
29	(Brazil) Leo Fernandes	Tampa Bay Rowdies	Birmingham Legion FC	
30	(England) Nicky Law	Tampa Bay Rowdies	Monterey Bay FC	
31	(Uruguay) Sebastian Guenzatti	Tampa Bay Rowdies	Loudoun United FC	
32	(United States) Matt LaGrassa	Sacramento Republic FC	San Diego Loyal SC	

Save of the Week
Week	Goalkeeper	Club	Opponent	Ref.
1	(Chile) Vicente Reyes	Atlanta United 2	Louisville City FC	
2	(Dominican Republic) Rafael Diaz	Monterey Bay FC	Colorado Springs Switchbacks	
3	(United States) Jake McGuire	Miami FC	Loudoun United FC	
4	(United States) Jordan Farr	San Antonio FC	Phoenix Rising FC	
5	(United States) Jordan Farr	San Antonio FC	Orange County SC	
6	(United States) Cody Mizell	New Mexico United	Phoenix Rising FC	
7	(United States) Jordan Farr	San Antonio FC	New Mexico United	
8	(United States) Joe Rice	Loudoun United FC	El Paso Locomotive	
9	(United States) Drew Romig	Memphis 901 FC	Charleston Battery	
10	(Greece) Alex Tabakis	New Mexico United	Charleston Battery	
11	(United States) Joe Rice	Loudoun United FC	Memphis 901 FC	
12	(United States) Joe Kuzminsky	Charleston Battery	Loudoun United FC	
13	(Greece) Alex Tabakis	New Mexico United	Orange County SC	
14	(United States) Jordan Farr	San Antonio FC	Monterey Bay FC	
15	(United States) Paul Blanchette	Oakland Roots SC	San Antonio FC	
16	(United States) Trey Muse	Memphis 901 FC	FC Tulsa	
17	(Greece) Alex Tabakis	New Mexico United	Monterey Bay FC	
18	(United States) Paul Blanchette	Oakland Roots SC	Sacramento Republic FC	
19	(United States) Jordan Farr	San Antonio FC	Miami FC	
20	(United States) Jordan Farr	San Antonio FC	El Paso Locomotive	
21	(United States) Colin Shutler	Orange County SC	San Diego Loyal SC	
22	(France) Hugo Fauroux	Charleston Battery	Louisville City FC	
23	(United States) Ford Parker	New Mexico United	LA Galaxy II	
24	(United States) Koke Vegas	San Diego Loyal SC	El Paso Locomotive	
25	(United States) Danny Vitiello	Sacramento Republic FC	Oakland Roots SC	
26	(United States) Carlos Saldaña	Sacramento Republic FC	Louisville City FC	
27	(United States) Ryan Shellow	Detroit City FC	Colorado Springs Switchbacks	
28	(United States) Danny Vitiello	Sacramento Republic FC	Orange County SC	
29	(Mexico) Christian Herrera	Colorado Springs Switchbacks	San Antonio FC	
30	(United States) Phil Breno	Tampa Bay Rowdies	Monterey Bay FC	
31	(Germany) Patrick Rakovsky	Orange County SC	El Paso Locomotive	
32	(Mexico) Carlos Herrera	Monterey Bay FC	Rio Grande Valley FC	

Team of the Week
Week	Goalkeeper	Defenders	Midfielders	Forwards	Bench	Ref.
**1**	(United States) Steinwascher (DET)	(United States) Segbers (MIA) (Democratic Republic of the Congo) Sousa (SAC) (United States) Wiedt (PGH)	(Mexico) Lopez (SAC) (United States) Quinn (PHX) (Algeria) Guediri (LDN) (United States) Perez (LOU)	(Scotland) Hurst (PHX) (Jamaica) **Kelly** (PGH) (Honduras) Martínez (SAC)	(United States) Lindley (COS) (Mexico) Rodriguez (PHX) (United States) Ryden (NMU) (United States) Vosvick (PGH) (Sierra Leone) A. Williams (CHS) (Jamaica) D. Williams (MIA) (United States) Ycaza (RGV)	
**2**	(Spain) Vegas (SDG)	(United States) Kelly (MEM) (United States) Taintor (SAN) (Brazil) Torres (TUL)	(United States) Aguirre (LAG) (United States) Casiple (OCO) (United States) Greene (LDN) (El Salvador) Rivas (TUL)	(United States) Ownby (LOU) (Mexico) **Trejo** (LVL) (Panama) Tejada (TBR)	(United States) Freeman (LDN) (Algeria) Guediri (LDN) (United States) Lewis (TUL) (Republic of Ireland) Molloy (MEM) (United States) Okoli (OCO) (United States) Perez (LOU) (United States) Portillo (NMU)	
**3**	(United States) Panicco (IND)	(Brazil) Torres (TUL) (United States) Totsch (LOU) (United States) Mahoney (COS)	(United States) Guido (SDG) (United States) Lindley (COS) (United States) Rodriguez (DET) (United States) Davila (LAG)	(United States) **Conway** (ATL) (United States) Boone (MB) (Mexico) Trejo (LVL)	(Guinea) Barry (COS) (United States) Kelly (MEM) (United States) LaCava (TBR) (United States) Lopez (LAG) (United States) Martin (SDG) (Honduras) Martínez (SAC) (United States) Roberts (MB)	
**4**	(United States) Cochran (TBR)	(Brazil) Torres (TUL) (United States) Centeno (ATL) (United States) King (PHX)	(Brazil) Firmino (ATL) (Democratic Republic of the Congo) Ngalina (COS) (South Africa) Moshobane (SDG) (United States) Lopez (SAC)	(United States) JJ Williams (TUL) (Mexico) **Trejo** (LVL) (Jamaica) Kelly (PGH)	(Ghana) Asiedu (BHM) (United States) Crisostomo (LVL) (England) Dennis (OAK) (United States) Kelly (MEM) (United States) Mahoney (COS) (United States) Morton (LOU) (United States) R. Williams (DET)	
**5**	(United States) Farr (SAN)	(England) Fox (ELP) (United States) Taintor (SAN) (United States) Amoo-Mensah (DET) (United States) Perez (LOU)	(United States) Mares (ELP) (Venezuela) Seijas (PHX) (Ghana) Asiedu (BHM)	(Cameroon) **Dikwa** (PGH) (Northern Ireland) Vassell (SDG) (France) Hoppenot (DET)	(Mexico) Borelli (ELP) (Haiti) Jérôme (IND) (United States) Lindley (COS) (United States) Luna (ELP) (Brazil) Pinho (IND) (United States) Quinn (PHX) (United States) Sparrow (MIA)	
**6**	(Germany) **Lundt** (PHX)	(Montenegro) Klimenta (OAK) (France) Garcia (SAN) (United States) Charpie (LOU)	(England) Law (IND) (United States) R. Williams (DET) (Republic of Ireland) Molloy (MEM) (Venezuela) Rito (OAK) (Jamaica) D. Williams (LAG)	(Mexico) Trejo (LVL) (Belize) Salazar (LAG)	(Venezuela) Azócar (OAK) (England) Hilton (TBR) (Scotland) Hurst (PHX) (United States) Segbers (MIA) (United States) Steinwascher (DET) (Spain) Viader (SAC) (England) Wyke (TBR)	
**7**	(United States) Farr (SAN)	(Jamaica) Lambert (PHX) (Canada) Johnson (COS) (Cuba) Nodarse (RGV)	(Jamaica) Forbes (PGH) (Montenegro) Malešević (RGV) (Democratic Republic of the Congo) Ngalina (COS) (United States) Rodriguez (DET)	(Jamaica) Kelly (PGH) (Uruguay) **Martinez** (BHM) (Brazil) Pinho (IND)	(United States) Argudo (PGH) (United States) Caldwell (COS) (United States) Crisostomo (LVL) (France) Garcia (SAN) (Democratic Republic of the Congo) Mushagalusa (LOU) (Venezuela) Seijas (PHX) (United States) Zandi (COS)	
**8**	(United States) Caldwell (COS)	(France) Garcia (SAN) (United States) Dia (LOU) (United States) Taintor (SAN)	(Mexico) Perez (LAG) (Ghana) **Kasim** (BHM) (United States) Hernandez (SAN) (United States) Mares (ELP)	(Argentina) Solignac (ELP) (Mexico) Torres (OCO) (Guinea) Barry (COS)	(Republic of Ireland) Casey (SAC) (United States) Harris (LOU) (United States) Lopez (BHM) (United States) Luna (ELP) (United States) Moon (SDG) (Brazil) PC (SAN) (El Salvador) Romero (LVL)	
**9**	(Germany) Lundt (PHX)	(Canada) Dossantos (PGH) (Haiti) Lacroix (SAC) (United States) Buckmaster (MEM)	(Republic of Ireland) McCabe (LOU) (El Salvador) Martinez (MB) (United States) Luna (ELP) (United States) Kelly (MEM)	(Argentina) **Solignac** (ELP) (El Salvador) Rivas (TUL) (Scotland) Hurst (PHX)	(Mexico) Gómez (ELP) (United States) Griffin (PGH) (United States) Mares (ELP) (United States) Martinez (RGV) (United States) Newton (ELP) (United States) Ownby (LOU) (United States) Zandi (COS)	
**10**	(United States) Silva (PGH)	(United States) Taintor (SAN) (United States) Richards (OCO) (United States) Z. Carroll (MEM)	(Finland) Kuningas (OCO) (United States) Rodriguez (DET) (Republic of Ireland) Molloy (MEM) (England) Hilton (TBR)	(United States) **Iloski** (OCO) (United States) Dunbar (LAG) (United States) Cicerone (PGH)	(United States) Coronado (RGV) (United States) Hertzog (HAR) (United States) Kelly (MEM) (United States) LaCava (TBR) (United States) Lara (LVL) (Greece) Tabakis (NMU) (United States) Wehan (NMU)	
**11**	(Guam) Jaye (MB)	(United States) Seagrist (MEM) (United States) Ricketts (RGV) (England) Wyke (TBR)	(Liberia) Bah (MIA) (United States) Ycaza (RGV) (United States) Kelly (MEM) (France) Valot (MIA)	(France) Hoppenot (DET) (Canada) Reid (MIA) (United States) **Goodrum** (MEM)	(Ghana) Ackwei (RGV) (United States) Berner (MEM) (United States) Dean (BHM) (United States) Fehr (MB) (Brazil) Fernandes (TBR) (Ivory Coast) Kissiedou (MEM) (Argentina) Solignac (ELP)	
**12**	(United States) Newton (ELP)	(Colombia) Palacios (MIA) (United States) Taintor (SAN) (United States) Dia (LOU)	(Venezuela) Seijas (PHX) (United States) Felipe (SAC) (United States) **Portillo** (NMU) (United States) Boone (MB)	(England) Lancaster (LOU) (United States) Dhillon (SAN) (Uruguay) Martinez (BHM)	(United States) Cicerone (PGH) (United States) Cobb (ATL) (United States) Davila (LAG) (Jamaica) Lambert (PHX) (United States) Kuzminsky (CHS) (United States) Rebollar (MB) (Northern Ireland) Vassell (SDG)	
**13**	(United States) Wormell (TUL)	(United States) Buckmaster (MEM) (United States) Mahoney (COS) (United States) Crognale (BHM)	(United States) Mertz (ATL) (Ghana) Kasim (BHM) (Democratic Republic of the Congo) Ngalina (COS) (United States) Coronado (RGV)	(Venezuela) **Arteaga** (IND) (Brazil) Fernando (MEM) (Iceland) Karlsson (OAK)	(Cameroon) Amang (SDG) (Ghana) Asante (IND) (Cuba) Diz (TUL) (Brazil) Fernandes (TBR) (United States) Goodrum (MEM) (United States) Ockford (COS) (Greece) Tabakis (NMU)	
**14**	(United States) Newton (ELP)	(United States) Rufe (BHM) (United States) Mahoney (COS) (Republic of Ireland) Desmond (SAC)	(Brazil) **Raimar** (ATL) (Brazil) PC (SAN) (United States) Lindley (COS) (Jamaica) Booth (CHB) (Spain) Viader (SAC)	(Mexico) Trejo (LVL) (Democratic Republic of the Congo) Ngalina (COS)	(Venezuela) Azócar (OAK) (United States) Farr (SAN) (Mexico) Gómez (ELP) (United States) Lopez (SAC) (United States) Martin (SDG) (Panama) Piggott (CHB) (United States) Robinson (LDN)	
**15**	(United States) Wormell (TUL)	(Ghana) Tetteh (NMU) (England) Brewitt (HFD) (Republic of Ireland) S. Carroll (DET)	(Democratic Republic of the Congo) Ngalina (COS) (Algeria) Guediri (LDN) (Republic of Ireland) Molloy (MEM) (Guinea) Barry (COS) (Mexico) Rivas (NMU)	(United States) **Judd** (LAG) (Egypt) Aboukoura (LDN)	(Venezuela) Arteaga (IND) (Democratic Republic of the Congo) Mushagalusa (LOU) (Grenada) Paterson (CHS) (United States) Prpa (HFD) (United States) Quinn (PHX) (Mexico) Romero (LVL) (Senegal) Traore (LVL)	
**16**	(United States) Shutler (OCO)	(United States) Lambe (LAG) (United States) Quezada (LVL) (United States) Smith (MEM) (United States) Dean (BHM)	(United States) Crisostomo (LVL) (El Salvador) Calvillo (ELP) (Brazil) Fernandes (TBR) (United States) Iloski (OCO)	(United States) JJ Williams (TUL) (Jamaica) **Foster** (SAC)	(United States) Dia (LOU) (United States) Diaz (OAK) (Mexico) Gómez (ELP) (Tunisia) Khmiri (SAN) (Republic of Ireland) Molloy (MEM) (Mexico) Sanchez (LAG) (Northern Ireland) Vassell (SDG)	
**17**	(United States) Sparrow (MIA)	(England) Wyke (TBR) (United States) Lambe (LAG) (United States) Wynder (LOU)	(United States) Mertz (ATL) (United States) Guido (SDG) (Jamaica) Forbes (PGH) (Jamaica) Lewis (HAR)	(United States) **Trager** (ATL) (United States) LaCava (TBR) (United States) Iloski (OCO)	(Guinea) Barry (COS) (United States) Cicerone (PGH) (United States) Drack (LAG) (United States) Dunbar (LAG) (France) F. Garcia (SAN) (United States) J. Garcia (RGV) (Denmark) Pedersen (OCO)	
**18**	(Cameroon) Siaha (MB)	(Trinidad and Tobago) Peters (PGH) (United States) Buckmaster (MEM) (Mexico) Borelli (ELP)	(United States) Dunbar (LAG) (United States) Lopez (SAC) (Uruguay) Martinez (BHM) (United States) Boone (MB)	(Democratic Republic of the Congo) **Mushagalusa** (LOU) (United States) Ownby (LOU) (United States) Judd (LAG)	(Brazil) da Costa (TUL) (Brazil) Fernandes (TBR) (Iceland) Karlsson (OAK) (United States) Mertz (ATL) (Republic of Ireland) Molloy (MEM) (United States) Steinwascher (DET) (United States) Wiedt (PGH)	
**19**	(Mexico) **Romero** (LVL)	(France) Garcia (SAN) (Norway) Bjørshol (LVL) (United States) Greene (MB)	(Venezuela) Rito (OAK) (Democratic Republic of the Congo) Ngalina (COS) (Ghana) Abu (SAN) (Antigua and Barbuda) Harris (TBR)	(Guinea) Barry (COS) (Iceland) Karlsson (OAK) (United States) Ownby (LOU)	(Ghana) Amoh (COS) (Mexico) Hernández (OAK) (Canada) James (BHM) (Colombia) Patiño (SAN) (Brazil) PC (SAN) (Greece) Tabakis (NMU) (Sierra Leone) A. Williams (CHS)	
**20**	(Germany) Lundt (PHX)	(Mexico) Leone (LVL) (United States) Perez (LOU) (England) Craig (MIA)	(South Africa) Moshobane (SDG) (Cuba) Pérez (CHS) (United States) Rodriguez (DET) (France) Valot (MIA)	(United States) **Iloski** (OCO) (Cape Verde) Dos Santos (TBR) (Brazil) Fernandes (TBR)	(Cameroon) Amang (SDG) (Scotland) Blake (SDG) (Grenada) Paterson (CHS) (United States) Rebollar (MB) (Mexico) Saldaña (SAC) (United States) Wehan (NMU) (United States) Wiedt (PGH)	
**21**	(Germany) Lundt (PHX)	(United States) Dean (BHM) (Jamaica) Scarlett (TBR) (Canada) Doner (MB)	(United States) Quinn (PHX) (Brazil) **Lapa** (BHM) (Argentina) Cuello (SAC) (Jamaica) Lambert (PHX)	(United States) Iloski (OCO) (Cape Verde) Dos Santos (TBR) (Jamaica) Brett (NMU)	(England) Adams (SDG) (Guadeloupe) Archimede (SAC) (Cameroon) Dikwa (PGH) (Germany) Oettl (HFD) (United States) Robinson (MB) (United States) Seymore (NMU) (United States) Taintor (SAN)	
**22**	(Spain) Vegas (SDG)	(United States) Dia (LOU) (United States) Dean (BHM) (United States) Stoneman (SDG)	(Uruguay) Martinez (BHM) (Republic of Ireland) Molloy (MEM) (United States) **Lopez** (SAC) (United States) Martin (SDG)	(United States) Agudelo (BHM) (United States) Murphy (MIA) (United States) Cicerone (PGH)	(United States) Fletcher (LDN) (Ghana) Kasim (BHM) (United States) Kelly (MEM) (United States) Rebollar (MB) (Albania) Skendi (OCO) (United States) Totsch (LOU) (United States) Zamudio (LDN)	
**23**	(Cameroon) Siaha (MB)	(United States) Perez (LOU) (United States) Segbers (MIA) (United States) Seagrist (MEM)	(United States) Murphy (MB) (United States) Zacarías (ELP) (United States) Hernandez (SAN) (England) Adams (SDG)	(United States) Adeniran (SAN) (Argentina) **Solignac** (ELP) (United States) Iloski (OCO)	(Guinea) Barry (COS) (United States) Lopez (BHM) (United States) Muse (MEM) (United States) Powers (OCO) (United States) Roberts (MB) (Liberia) Saydee (HAR) (Cuba) Suárez (TUL)	
**24**	(United States) **Wormell** (TUL)	(United States) Drack (LAG) (United States) Ward (RGV) (United States) Lewis (DET) (United States) Stanley (MIA)	(England) Adams (SDG) (El Salvador) Garay (LDN) (Scotland) Blake (SDG) (Republic of Ireland) Molloy (MEM)	(Uruguay) Martinez (BHM) (Northern Ireland) Vassell (SDG)	(Cameroon) Amang (SDG) (United States) Cicerone (PGH) (United States) Conway (SDG) (France) Fauroux (CHS) (Spain) Keko (SAC) (Canada) Mullings (NYR) (United States) Robinson (LDN)	
**25**	(United States) **Blanchette** (OAK)	(Mexico) Borelli (ELP) (Mexico) Pimentel (RGV) (United States) Donovan (SAC)	(Brazil) Fernandes (TBR) (United States) Torres (RGV) (Brazil) Lapa (BHM) (Norway) Fjeldberg (RGV)	(Argentina) Solignac (ELP) (Cameroon) Dikwa (PGH) (Mexico) Botello Faz (DET)	(England) Craig (MIA) (United States) Dambrot (IND) (United States) Dean (BHM) (Japan) Endoh (LAG) (Liberia) Johnson (HFD) (Cuba) Suárez (TUL) (United States) Trilk (IND)	
**26**	(United States) Zamudio (LDN)	(United States) Dia (LOU) (Canada) Doner (MB) (Jamaica) Scarlett (TBR)	(Panama) Piggott (CHB) (Brazil) Fernandes (TBR) (England) Gleadle (MB) (United States) Lindley (COS)	(United States) Adeniran (SAN) (Brazil) **Pinho** (IND) (United States) Conway (ATL)	(United States) Filipe (NYR) (Jamaica) Forbes (PGH) (England) Hilton (TBR) (Chile) Reyes (ATL) (Venezuela) Seijas (PHX) (Argentina) Solignac (ELP) (United States) Totsch (LOU)	
**27**	(United States) Farr (SAN)	(Venezuela) Fuenmayor (OAK) (Republic of Ireland) Casey (SAC) (United States) Gdula (HFD)	(El Salvador) Rivas (TUL) (Trinidad and Tobago) Hackshaw (IND) (United States) Rodriguez (DET) (United States) Pinzón (RGV)	(United States) **Goodrum** (MEM) (Ghana) Asante (IND) (South Africa) Mfeka (OAK)	(Jamaica) Booth (CHB) (England) Gleadle (MB) (United States) Greene (MB) (United States) Murphy (MIA) (United States) Muse (MEM) (Democratic Republic of the Congo) Mushagalusa (LOU) (United States) Ruiz (RGV)	
**28**	(Germany) Oettl (HFD)	(United States) Seagrist (MEM) (United States) Totsch (LOU) (Haiti) Lacroix (SAC)	(Uruguay) **E. Martinez** (BHM) (Spain) Viader (SAC) (England) Gleadle (MB) (United States) Mares (ELP)	(United States) Goodrum (MEM) (Jamaica) Foster (SAC) (Cuba) A. Martinez (HFD)	(Scotland) Blake (SDG) (Tanzania) Kasanzu (SDG) (Spain) Keko (SAC) (United States) Ownby (LOU) (United States) Pinzón (RGV) (Venezuela) Rito (OAK) (Cameroon) Siaha (MB)	
**29**	(United States) Farr (SAN)	(United States) Smith (MEM) (United States) Bryant (DET) (United States) Mahoney (COS) (United States) Crognale (BHM)	(United States) **Pinzón** (RGV) (United States) Freeman (LDN) (United States) Bird (TUL)	(Norway) Simonsen (LDN) (United States) Volesky (MB) (United States) Adeniran (SAN)	(United States) Deric (RGV) (Iceland) Karlsson (OAK) (United States) Ku-DiPietro (LDN) (South Africa) Matthews (DET) (Brazil) PC (SAN) (United States) Robinson (MB) (United States) Ward (RGV)	
**30**	(Germany) Lundt (PHX)	(United States) Seymore (NMU) (United States) Manley (SAN) (United States) Farrell (PHX)	(United States) **Rodriguez** (DET) (Spain) Ayoze (IND) (Mexico) Trejo (LVL) (Jamaica) Lewis (HAR)	(United States) Sowinski (TUL) (Cuba) A. Martinez (HFD) (Cuba) Suárez (TUL)	(Scotland) Blake (SDG) (United States) Breno (TBR) (United States) Dambrot (IND) (England) Dennis (OAK) (Brazil) Fernandes (TBR) (United States) Segbers (MIA) (United States) JJ Williams (PHX)	
**31**	(Chile) Reyes (ATL)	(United States) Wynder (LOU) (United States) Cochran (IND) (United States) Antley (TBR)	(Norway) Fjeldberg (RGV) (United States) Torres (RGV) (El Salvador) Moreno (NMU) (United States) Trager (ATL)	(Democratic Republic of the Congo) **Ngalina** (COS) (Brazil) Pinho (IND) (Uruguay) Guenzatti (TBR)	(Venezuela) Azócar (OAK) (France) Garcia (SAN) (United States) Goodrum (MEM) (Ivory Coast) Kissiedou (MEM) (Mexico) Leone (LVL) (Mexico) Romero (LVL) (Argentina) Solignac (ELP)	
**32**	(United States) Berner (MEM)	(United States) Dean (BHM) (United States) Ward (RGV) (Mexico) Guillén (TBR)	(United States) **Swartz** (NMU) (Republic of Ireland) Molloy (MEM) (United States) Epps (TUL) (Brazil) Marlon (BHM) (Brazil) Torres (PHX)	(United States) Cicerone (PGH) (Brazil) Fernandes (TBR)	(Nigeria) Akinyode (MIA) (England) Chapman-Page (MIA) (Jamaica) Forbes (PGH) (United States) Lopez (SAC) (United States) Marcucci (NYR) (United States) Nava (NMU) (United States) Quinn (PHX)	
**Bold** denotes Player of the Week
