= Kembo Kibato =

Canadian soccer player (born 2000)

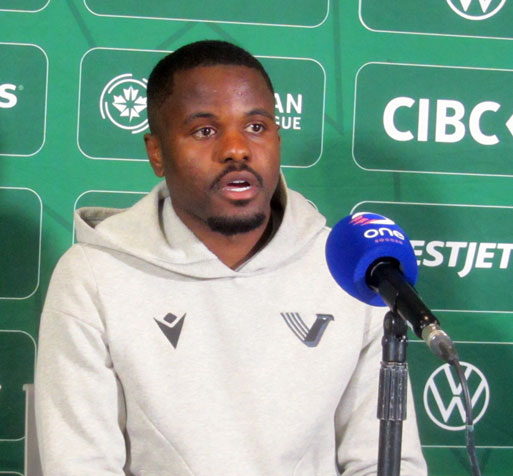
- Kibato in 2024

Personal information
- Date of birth: September 16, 2000 (age 26)
- Place of birth: Toronto, Ontario, Canada
- Height: 1.70 m (5 ft 7 in)
- Position: Attacking midfielder

Team information
- Current team: Inter Toronto FC
- Number: 21

Youth career
- –2017: North Toronto Nitros
- 2017–2019: Toronto FC

Senior career*
Years	Team	Apps	(Gls)
2016–2017	North Toronto Nitros	21	(4)
2018	Toronto FC III	8	(0)
2019–2020	Helsingør	0	(0)
2020–2021	Rio Grande Valley FC	12	(1)
2021	→ FC Tulsa (loan)	29	(2)
2022	FC Tulsa	28	(0)
2023	Hartford Athletic	19	(0)
2024	Vancouver FC	9	(0)
2024–	Inter Toronto FC (Note: York United FC changed its name to Inter Toronto FC in 2026)	52	(2)
- * Club domestic league appearances and goals as of October 31, 2026

Kembo Kibato (born September 16, 2000) is a Canadian professional soccer player who plays as an attacking midfielder for Canadian Premier League side Inter Toronto FC.

== Early life ==
Kibato played youth soccer with the North Toronto Nitros.

In 2017, he played with Team Ontario at the 2017 Canada Summer Games, helping them win the gold medal. In 2017, Kibato joined the Toronto FC Academy.

== Club career ==
In 2016, Kibato debuted with the North Toronto Nitros senior team in League1 Ontario, making two substitute appearances. The following season, he joined the senior squad full-time, scoring 4 goals in 19 appearances, and was named a league third-team all-star. In 2018, he played with Toronto FC III.

In 2019, he attended training camp with Forge FC of the Canadian Premier League, but did not ultimately sign with the club. On July 18, 2019, Kibato signed with Danish 2nd Division side FC Helsingør.

Kibato left on January 14, 2020 without making an official first team appearance, having only played in friendlies. On March 7, 2020, Kibato joined USL Championship side Rio Grande Valley FC. He made his debut for RGVFC on July 11, 2020, appearing as an 83rd-minute substitute during a 1–0 loss to El Paso Locomotive.

He scored his first professional goal on August 8 against Austin Bold FC. In October, he was named to the USL Championship Team of the Week after recording two assists in a 4-2 victory against OKC Energy FC in the season finale.

On April 9, 2021, Kibato moved on a season-long loan to USL Championship side FC Tulsa. At the end of the season, he was named the team's Newcomer of the Year. On December 29, Tulsa announced they had signed Kibato to a permanent deal ahead of the 2022 season.

Following the 2022 season, Kibato’s contract ended. On December 12, 2022, Kibato was announced as a new signing for USL Championship side Hartford Athletic ahead of their 2023 season. On February 29, 2024, Vancouver FC announced the signing of the Canadian midfielder on a two-year contract, ahead of the 2024 Canadian Premier League season.

=== York United / Inter Toronto ===
In September 2024, Kibato was transferred to York United FC, signing a contract through 2025, in a player swap deal with Austin Ricci moving to Vancouver. He made his debut against Forge FC, playing as a left-back during an injury crisis for York, before eventually returning to his customary midfield role later in the season.

In December 2025, Kibato would sign a 3 year contract extension with the newly rebranded Inter Toronto, keeping him with the club through the 2028 season.

== Career statistics ==
As of match played October 27, 2025

Appearances and goals by club, season and competition
Club	Season	League			Playoffs		Domestic Cup		Continental		Total	
Club	Season	Division	Apps	Goals	Apps	Goals	Apps	Goals	Apps	Goals	Apps	Goals
North Toronto Nitros	2016	League1 Ontario	2	0	—		—		—		2	0
North Toronto Nitros	2017	League1 Ontario	19	4	—		—		—		19	4
North Toronto Nitros	Total		21	4	0	0	0	0	0	0	21	4
Toronto FC III	2018	League1 Ontario	8	0	—		—		—		8	0
FC Helsingør	2019–20	Danish 2nd Division	0	0	—		0	0	—		0	0
Rio Grande Valley FC	2020	USL Championship	12	1	—		—		—		12	1
FC Tulsa (loan)	2021	USL Championship	29	2	1	0	—		—		30	2
FC Tulsa	2022	USL Championship	28	0	0	0	2	0	—		30	0
FC Tulsa	Total		57	2	1	0	2	0	0	0	60	2
Hartford Athletic	2023	USL Championship	17	0	0	0	0	0	—		17	0
Vancouver FC	2024	Canadian Premier League	9	0	0	0	1	0	—		10	0
Inter Toronto FC	2024	Canadian Premier League	3	0	2	0	0	0	—		5	0
Inter Toronto FC	2025	Canadian Premier League	28	1	2	0	3	0	—		33	1
Inter Toronto FC	Total		31	1	4	0	3	0	0	0	38	1
Career total			145	8	5	0	6	0	0	0	166	8
