= Christopher Cragwell =

Panamanian footballer (born 2001)

Cristopher Cragwell
Personal information
- Full name: Cristopher Denzel Cragwell Sjogreen
- Date of birth: 26 June 2001 (age 25)
- Place of birth: Panama City, Panama
- Height: 1.83 m (6 ft 0 in)
- Position: Defender

Senior career*
Years	Team	Apps	(Gls)
2019–	Árabe Unido	26	(0)
2022	→ New York Red Bulls II (loan)	16	(0)
- * Club domestic league appearances and goals as of 05:14, 22 March 2022 (UTC)

Cristopher Denzel Cragwell Sjogreen (born 26 June 2001) is a Panamanian professional footballer who plays as a defender.

== Club career ==
=== Árabe Unido ===
Born in Panama City, Cragwell graduated from Árabe Unido's youth setup, and made his senior debut in the 2019 campaign, aged only 18. He quickly established himself as a first team regular and had his best season in 2020–21 in which he made 15 league appearances and was named to the league's team of the week three times.

=== New York Red Bulls II ===
On 1 February 2022, it was announced that Cragwell was joining New York Red Bulls II on a season long loan.

== International career ==
In June 2023, he took part in the Maurice Revello Tournament in France with Panama. He won the tournament by beating Mexico in final.

== Career statistics ==
As of 16 November 2021

Appearances and goals by club, season and competition
Club	Season	League			National cup		League cup		International		Total	
Club	Season	Division	Apps	Goals	Apps	Goals	Apps	Goals	Apps	Goals	Apps	Goals
Árabe Unido	2019	LPF	4	0	—		—		—		4	0
Árabe Unido	2020	LPF	7	0	0	0	—		0	0	7	0
Árabe Unido	2021	LPF	15	0	0	0	—		—		15	0
Árabe Unido	Total		26	0	0	0	—		0	0	26	0
New York Red Bulls II	2022	USL Championship	16	0	0	0	0	0	—		16	0
Career total			42	0	0	0	0	0	0	0	42	0
