= Chase Vosvick =

American soccer player

Personal information
- Date of birth: July 28, 1998 (age 28)
- Place of birth: Phoenix, Maryland, United States
- Height: 1.83 m (6 ft 0 in)
- Position: Goalkeeper

Team information
- Current team: Harrisburg Heat
- Number: 31

College career
Years	Team	Apps	(Gls)
2017–2021	Loyola Greyhounds	73	(0)

Senior career*
Years	Team	Apps	(Gls)
2019	Brazos Valley Cavalry	10	(0)
2022	Pittsburgh Riverhounds	2	(0)
2022–	Harrisburg Heat (indoor)	18	(0)
- * Club domestic league appearances and goals as of November 27, 2024

Chase Vosvick (born July 28, 1998) is an American soccer player who currently plays as a goalkeeper for the Harrisburg Heat in the Major Arena Soccer League.

== Career ==
=== Youth ===
Vosvick attended Montverde Academy for high school, scoring back-to-back national championships with the team in 2016 and 2017.

=== College and amateur ===
Vosvick began attending Loyola University Maryland in fall 2017, and made appearances in all five seasons that he attended the university. In his freshman season, he made 17 appearances with seven shutouts and was named the Patriot League Goalkeeper of the Year. Vosvick claimed the honor three additional times; in 2018 and in the spring and fall of 2021. In the spring of 2021, he was included on the MAC Hermann Trophy watch list.

Following his sophomore season, in the summer of 2019, Vosvick competed in USL League Two with the Brazos Valley Cavalry. He made 10 appearances for the club, tallying 68 saves.

=== Professional ===
Vosvick began training with the Pittsburgh Riverhounds prior to the 2022 season. In late February, Vosvick signed his first professional contract with the club; a one-year deal with an option to extend for 2023. He made his professional debut on March 12, 2022, registering a shutout in a 3–0 victory over Memphis 901.
