= Luca Sowinski =

American soccer player

Personal information
- Full name: Luca Sowinski
- Date of birth: June 5, 2004 (age 22)
- Place of birth: Carlsbad, California, United States
- Height: 5 ft 8 in (1.73 m)
- Position: Midfielder

Youth career
- 2009–2019: City SC Carlsbad
- 2019–2022: Barca Residency Academy

Senior career*
Years	Team	Apps	(Gls)
2022–2024	FC Tulsa	4	(3)
2023	→ Charlotte Independence (loan)	6	(0)
2025	Lexington SC II	8	(1)
- * Club domestic league appearances and goals as of October 14, 2025

Luca Sowinski (born June 5, 2004) is an American professional soccer player who plays as a midfielder.

== Club career ==
Born in Carlsbad, California, Sowinski began his career with local youth club City SC Carlsbad before joining the Arizona-based Barca Residency Academy in 2019 at the age of 15. Sowinski rose through the competitive ranks and topped off his Barca Residency Academy career in June 2022 with a club-leading 15 goals and five assists in 20 appearances as he helped Barca's U-19 side to its second consecutive MLS Next Southwest Division Championship and playoff berth.

On July 14, 2022, despite accepting an offer to play college soccer with the Denver Pioneers, Sowinski signed a professional contract with USL Championship club FC Tulsa, becoming the youngest ever player in club history.

He made his professional debut for FC Tulsa against Detroit City on September 24, 2022, starting and playing 63 minutes in the 2–2 draw. A week later in his second professional appearance, on October 1, 2022, Sowinski scored his first professional hat-trick in a 4–2 victory against Indy Eleven.

On May 10, 2023, Sowinski joined USL League One side Charlotte Independence on loan for the remainder of the 2023 season.

He left Tulsa following their 2024 season.

== Career statistics ==
As of match played October 20, 2022

Appearances and goals by club, season and competition
Club	Season	League			National Cup		Continental		Total	
Club	Season	Division	Apps	Goals	Apps	Goals	Apps	Goals	Apps	Goals
FC Tulsa	2022	USL Championship	4	3	0	0	—	—	4	3
Career total			4	3	0	0	0	0	4	3
