= Trevor James (football manager) =

British football manager

Personal information
- Place of birth: Norwich, England

Managerial career
- Years: Team
- 2006–2010: LA Galaxy (Assistant)
- 2010–2012: Portland Timbers (Assistant)
- 2014–2015: Chicago Fire (Scout)
- 2017–2018: Indy Eleven (Assistant)
- 2019–2023: Detroit City FC
- 2023–2025: Detroit City FC (Sporting Director)

Trevor James is an English football manager who most recently served as sporting director of USL Championship club Detroit City FC.

== Career ==
=== Early career ===
James had many stops in various roles along his journey, including Viking Stavangar of the Norwegian First Division, Los Angeles Lazers of the Major Indoor Soccer League, and Ipswich Town F.C., Colchester United F.C. and Cambridge United in England. He also worked as a scout throughout the 1980s and 90s with Sir Bobby Robson at FC Barcelona, Newcastle United, FC Porto, Sporting CP and the England national football team.

=== Managing in the United States ===
James started his managerial career in America in 2006 as assistant manager of MLS side LA Galaxy under Frank Yallop and Ruud Gullit. Additionally, he acted as director of player development for the club, overseeing the club's youth program.

In 2010, he was appointed assistant manager of Portland Timbers for their inaugural MLS season under John Spencer.

James moved to a scouting role with the Chicago Fire beginning in the 2014 season.

In 2017 and 2018, James was the assistant manager of American second tier club Indy Eleven for their last year in the NASL and their first year in USL.

=== Detroit City FC ===
In 2019, he was appointed manager of Detroit City FC of the National Premier Soccer League, in the top tier of the American amateur system. After helping them win three regional titles, he continued to lead the team as it became a professional club and joined the National Independent Soccer Association in the American third tier in 2020. After 2 titles in the league, James remained at the helm as Detroit City moved to the second tier USL Championship for the 2022 season. James led the team to consecutive playoff appearances in their first two USL Championship seasons, and a victory over MLS club Columbus Crew in the 2022 U.S. Open Cup, before taking on the role of sporting director following the conclusion of the 2023 season. In July 2025, Detroit City FC announced that James and the club had parted ways.
