= Ciaran Winters =

American soccer player

Personal information
- Full name: Anthony Ciaran Winters
- Date of birth: May 29, 2001 (age 25)
- Place of birth: Tulsa, Oklahoma, United States
- Height: 6 ft 1 in (1.85 m)
- Position: Midfielder

Team information
- Current team: Tulsa Athletic
- Number: 2

Youth career
- 2008–2018: Tulsa Soccer Academy
- 2018–2019: Sporting Kansas City
- 2020: FC Tulsa

Senior career*
Years	Team	Apps	(Gls)
2019–2022	FC Tulsa	12	(0)
2022	→ Northern Colorado Hailstorm (loan)	0	(0)
2023–	Tulsa Athletic		
- * Club domestic league appearances and goals as of March 20, 2025

Anthony Ciaran Winters (born May 29, 2001) is an American professional soccer player who plays as a midfielder for Tulsa Athletic.

== Club career ==
Born in Tulsa, Oklahoma, Winters began his career with Tulsa Soccer Club, where his coach was future FC Tulsa head coach Michael Nsien. He soon moved to the youth academy of Sporting Kansas City before moving back to his hometown and signing an academy contract with USL Championship side FC Tulsa on December 27, 2019. The amateur deal meant that Winters was able to retain his NCAA eligibility for college soccer.

On January 12, 2021, Winters signed a professional contract with FC Tulsa, becoming the first academy-to-professional player in club history. He then made his senior debut for the club on April 24, 2021, in their opening match against OKC Energy, coming on as a late substitute during the 3–1 victory.

On April 6, 2022, Winters signed with USL League One club Northern Colorado Hailstorm on a season-long loan ahead of their inaugural season. He was recalled by Tulsa on May 28, 2022, without having made a league appearance for Northern Colorado during his loan spell, appearing only for the club on two occasions in the Lamar Hunt U.S. Open Cup. He was released by Tulsa following the 2022 season.

In 2023, Winters played with Tulsa Athletic during their UPSL season and appeared for the club in the Lamar Hunt US Open Cup against his former side Kansas City.

== Career statistics ==
As of match played May 19, 2021

Appearances and goals by club, season and competition
Club	Season	League			Cup		Continental		Total	
Club	Season	Division	Apps	Goals	Apps	Goals	Apps	Goals	Apps	Goals
FC Tulsa	2021	USL Championship	10	0	0	0	—		10	0
Career total			10	0	0	0	0	0	10	0

== Personal ==
Winters is the son of former Tulsa Roughnecks player Tony Winters.
