= Marlon (footballer, born April 1995) =

Brazilian footballer

Personal information
- Full name: Marlon dos Santos Prazeres
- Date of birth: 29 April 1995 (age 31)
- Place of birth: Rio de Janeiro, Brazil
- Height: 1.73 m (5 ft 8 in)
- Positions: Forward; winger

Team information
- Current team: Al-Tadamon

Youth career
- Nova Iguaçu

Senior career*
Years	Team	Apps	(Gls)
2015–2017	Nova Iguaçu	35	(8)
2017	Bangu	4	(1)
2018	Botafogo PB	3	(0)
2018–2019	Madureira	8	(2)
2019–2021	FC Tulsa	55	(17)
2022–2023	Birmingham Legion	33	(9)
2023	Ironi Kiryat Shmona	12	(0)
2024	Memphis 901	28	(9)
2025	Duhok SC	0	(0)
2025–2026	Al-Anwar	32	(6)
2026–	Al-Tadamon	0	(0)
- * Club domestic league appearances and goals as of 13 November 2024

Marlon dos Santos Prazeres (born 29 April 1995), known as Marlon or Marlon Santos, is a Brazilian footballer who plays as a forward or a left winger for Al-Tadamon.

== Career ==
=== Early career ===
Marlon joined Nova Iguaçu when he was nine years old, eventually making his way to the senior team.

In 2017, he joined Brazilian Serie D side Bangu.

For the 2018 season, he joined Botafogo PB.

Afterwards, he joined Madureira in May 2018.

=== FC Tulsa ===
On 13 August 2019, Marlon joined USL Championship side Tulsa Roughnecks FC. After joining Tulsa during a 16 game winless streak, Marlon helped contribute five goals and three assists in his nine appearances for the Roughnecks. On 22 November 2019, Tulsa announced they had re-signed Marlon to a multiyear deal at the club ahead of their upcoming 2020 season. He was named Tulsa's Offensive Player of the Year in 2021, with nine goals and three assists on the season, including two late goals in a match against Memphis 901 FC on 25 August 2021 in a 2–1 victory. He departed the club after the 2021 season, having scored 17 goals and adding eight assists over his 56 appearances in three seasons.

=== Birmingham Legion FC ===
Marlon signed with Birmingham Legion FC on 3 January 2022. He scored his first goal for Birmingham in their home opener against the Tampa Bay Rowdies on 13 March.

=== Hapoel Ironi Kiryat Shmona ===
On 5 January 2023, Marlon was transferred to Israeli Premier League side Hapoel Ironi Kiryat Shmona.

=== Memphis 901 FC ===
Marlon returned to the USL Championship in December 2023, signing with Memphis 901.

=== Duhok SC ===
On 10 January 2025, Marlon signed with Iraq Stars League club Duhok SC.

=== Al-Anwar ===
On 7 August 2025, Marlon joined Saudi Arabian club Al-Anwar.

== Honours ==
Duhok

- Iraq FA Cup: 2024–25
- AGCFF Gulf Club Champions League: 2024–25
