= Johnny Fenwick =

English footballer

Personal information
- Date of birth: 20 November 1994 (age 31)
- Place of birth: Newcastle upon Tyne, England
- Height: 1.88 m (6 ft 2 in)
- Position: Centre back

Team information
- Current team: Asheville City
- Number: 16

Youth career
- –2011: Newcastle United
- 2011–2014: Sheffield Wednesday

College career
Years	Team	Apps	(Gls)
2015–2018	High Point Panthers	77	(4)

Senior career*
Years	Team	Apps	(Gls)
2016–2017	North Carolina Fusion U23	12	(0)
2018	Des Moines Menace	12	(1)
2019	San Antonio FC	3	(0)
2020	Las Vegas Lights	15	(1)
2021	Atlantic City FC	10	(4)
2021–2022	FC Tulsa	43	(0)
2023	Sacramento Republic	6	(0)
2024	Northern Colorado Hailstorm	13	(0)
2025–	Asheville City	0	(0)
- * Club domestic league appearances and goals as of 20 March 2025

Johnny Fenwick (born 20 November 1994) is an English footballer who plays as a defender for USL League Two club Asheville City SC.

== Career ==
=== College & amateur ===
Fenwick played four years of college soccer at High Point University between 2015 and 2018. While at college, Fenwick also appeared for USL PDL sides North Carolina Fusion U23 and Des Moines Menace.

=== Professional ===
On 18 January 2019, Fenwick signed for USL Championship side San Antonio FC.

Following his release from San Antonio, Fenwick signed for fellow USL Championship side Las Vegas Lights FC on 28 February 2020.

On 11 August 2021, Fenwick signed for FC Tulsa for the remainder of the season. He was released by Tulsa following the 2022 season.

On 9 February 2023, Fenwick was announced as a new signing for USL Championship side Sacramento Republic FC. He left Sacramento following their 2023 season.

Fenwick signed with Northern Colorado Hailstorm of USL League One in January 2024.

Fenwick joined USL League Two club Asheville City SC in 2025 ahead of the club's appearance in the 2025 U.S. Open Cup.
