= Austin Wormell =

American soccer player

Personal information
- Full name: Austin Wormell
- Date of birth: May 26, 1998 (age 28)
- Place of birth: Tulsa, Oklahoma, United States
- Height: 1.83 m (6 ft 0 in)
- Position: Goalkeeper

Team information
- Current team: Las Vegas Lights
- Number: 31

Youth career
- 2010–2016: Tulsa Soccer Club
- 2016–2017: Blitz United

College career
Years	Team	Apps	(Gls)
2017	Creighton Bluejays	0	(0)
2018	Oregon State Beavers	0	(0)
2019–2020	Rogers State Hillcats	15	(0)

Senior career*
Years	Team	Apps	(Gls)
2018	Tulsa Athletic	7	(0)
2021–2023	FC Tulsa	40	(0)
2024–	Las Vegas Lights	2	(0)
- * Club domestic league appearances and goals as of October 31, 2024

Austin Wormell (born May 26, 1998) is an American soccer player who currently plays for Las Vegas Lights in the USL Championship.

== Career ==
=== Youth ===
Wormell played high school soccer at Bishop Kelley High School, helping the school to the 2017 Oklahoma Class 5A state championship and earning a spot on the Oklahoma All-State team. He also played club soccer at Tulsa Soccer Club between 2010 and 2016, and Blitz United between 2016 and 2017.

=== College and amateur ===
In 2017, Wormell attended Creighton University to play college soccer, but redshirted his freshman season for the Bluejays. He transferred to Oregon State University in 2018, but didn't appear for the Beavers. Wormell transferred again to Rogers State University for 2019, and made 15 appearances for the Hillcats, which included a single appearance in 2020 before the season was cancelled due to the COVID-19 pandemic.

In 2018, Wormell played in the NPSL for Tulsa Athletic, making 7 regular season appearances.

=== Professional ===
On March 11, 2021, Wormell signed with USL Championship side FC Tulsa, a team he'd worked for in 2020 for the front office in Community Engagement & Operations. He made his professional debut on June 25, 2021, starting in a 2–1 win over Rio Grande Valley FC.

Wormell signed with Las Vegas Lights on February 16, 2024.
