= Rodrigo da Costa (footballer, born 1993) =

Brazilian footballer (born 1993)

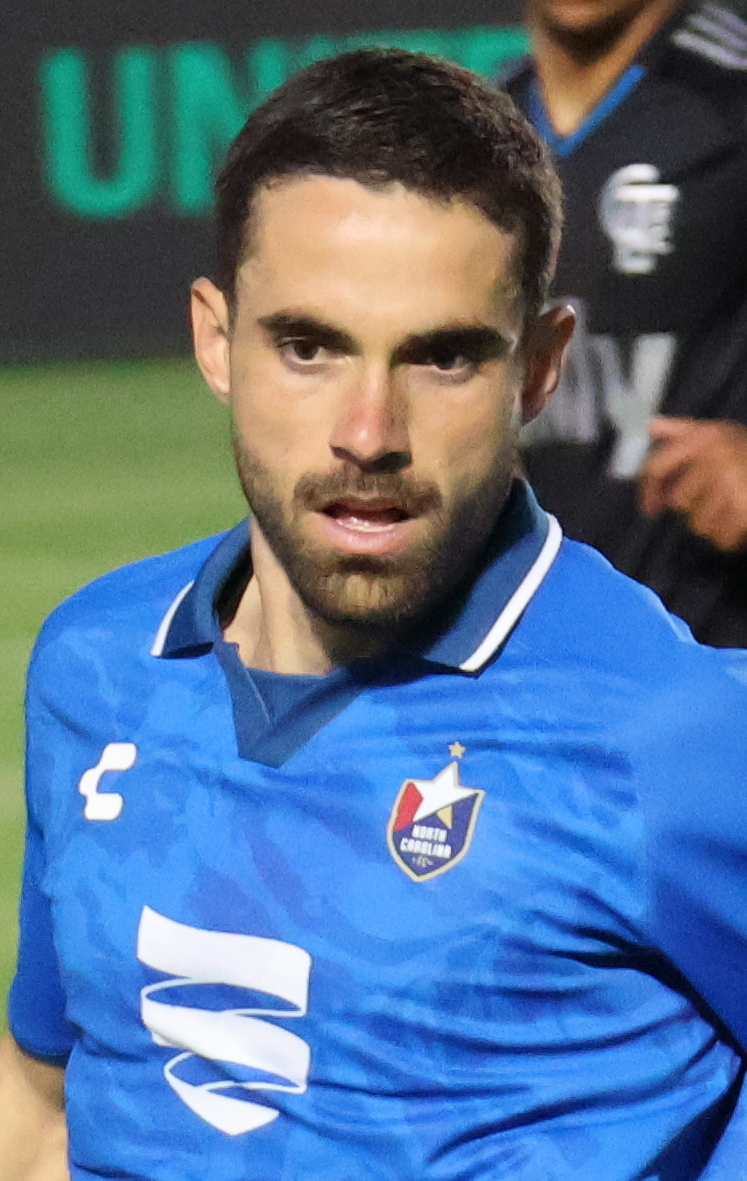
- Da Costa with North Carolina FC in 2025

Personal information
- Full name: Rodrigo Bandeira da Costa
- Date of birth: 20 December 1993 (age 32)
- Place of birth: Rio de Janeiro, Brazil
- Height: 1.84 m (6 ft 0 in)
- Position: Attacking midfielder

Team information
- Current team: Miami FC
- Number: 22

Youth career
- 2005–2007: Botafogo

College career
Years	Team	Apps	(Gls)
2015	Florida Memorial Lions	2	(0)
2016–2018	Florida National Conquistadors		

Senior career*
Years	Team	Apps	(Gls)
2018	Florida Soccer Soldiers		
2019–2023	FC Tulsa	124	(35)
2023	Memphis 901	25	(12)
2024–2025	North Carolina FC	54	(9)
2026–	Miami FC	26	(3)
- * Club domestic league appearances and goals as of October 31, 2026

Rodrigo Bandeira da Costa (born 20 December 1993) is a Brazilian professional footballer who plays as a midfielder for Miami FC in the USL Championship.

In December 2023, da Costa signed with North Carolina FC.
