= Michael Nsien =

American soccer player and coach

Personal information
- Date of birth: February 14, 1981 (age 45)
- Place of birth: Tulsa, Oklahoma, U.S.
- Height: 6 ft 1 in (1.85 m)
- Position: Defender

Youth career
- Tulsa Thunder

College career
Years	Team	Apps	(Gls)
1999–2002	Dayton Flyers	73	(9)

Senior career*
Years	Team	Apps	(Gls)
2005	LA Galaxy	0	(0)
2006	Portland Timbers		
- Al-Shaab

International career
- Nigeria U23

Managerial career
- 2018: Tulsa Roughnecks (assistant)
- 2018: Tulsa Roughnecks (interim)
- 2018–2022: FC Tulsa
- 2022–2023: United States U16
- 2023–2024: United States U19
- 2025–: Nashville SC (assistant)
Medal record
Men's football
Representing United States
CONCACAF U-20 Championship
Runner-up	2024 Mexico
- * Club domestic league appearances and goals

Michael Nsien (born February 14, 1981) is an American former professional soccer player and coach. He is currently an assistant coach for Major League Soccer club Nashville SC.

== Player ==
=== Career ===
Nsien played college soccer at the University of Dayton between 1999 and 2003, scoring 9 goals at left fullback in 73 appearances.

Following college, Nsien signed with the LA Galaxy in 2005 as a reserve player, and then with the USL's Portland Timbers in 2006. He also played in the UAE for UAE Pro-League side Al-Shaab and was a member of the 2003 Nigerian U-23 National Team that ultimately failed to qualify for the 2004 Olympics in Athens.

== Coaching ==
Nsien became an assistant coach for the Tulsa Roughnecks, before taking over the side from David Vaudreuil as interim head coach in June 2018. Nsien was named the permanent head coach in December 2018. Nsien was relieved of coaching duties in June 2022.

Nsien was named head coach of the United States U-16 men's national team on November 15, 2022.

Nsien joined the staff of Major League Soccer side Nashville SC in January 2025.

== Coaching statistics ==
As of matches played on June 3, 2024.

Coaching record by team and tenure
Team	From	To	Record				
Team	From	To	P	W	D	L	Win %
United States U-19 MNT	October 2023	Present	9	5	0	4	55.6
United States U-20 MNT	July 2024	July 2024	6	5	0	1	83.3
United States U-18 MNT	September 2024	September 2024	3	1	1	1	33.3
Total			18	11	1	6	61.1
