= 2022 Tampa Bay Rowdies season =

Tampa Bay Rowdies
2022 season
- Chairman: Stuart Sternberg
- Head coach: Neill Collins
- Stadium: Al Lang Stadium
- USL Championship: 3rd, Eastern Conference
- USL Cup: Eastern Conference Final
- U.S. Open Cup: Third round
- Top goalscorer: League: Leo Fernandes (20); All: Leo Fernandes (20)
- Highest home attendance: League: 6,714 (August 27 vs. Orange County)
- Lowest home attendance: League: 3,454 (October 12 vs. El Paso)
- Average home league attendance: 5,147
- Biggest win: 8–0 (October 8 vs LDN)
- Biggest defeat: 3–1 (April 27 @ MEM)
Home colors	Away colors	Third colors

The 2022 Tampa Bay Rowdies season was the club's thirteenth season of existence, their sixth in the United Soccer League, and fourth in the USL Championship. Including the previous Tampa Bay Rowdies, this is the 29th season of a franchise in the Tampa Bay metro area with the Rowdies moniker. Including the now-defunct Tampa Bay Mutiny, this is the 35th season of professional soccer in the Tampa Bay region.

== Club ==
=== Roster ===
As of October 29, 2022

Squad No.	Name	Nationality	Position(s)	Since	Date of birth (age)	Signed from	Games played (Note: Regular season only)	Goals scored
Goalkeepers
1	CJ Cochran	(United States)	GK	2022	September 17, 1991 (age 35)	Loan from OKC Energy FC	25	0
30	Phil Breno	(United States)	GK	2022	December 11, 1995 (age 30)	Loan from Forward Madison FC	8	0
56	Raiko Arozarena	(Cuba)	GK	2021	March 27, 1997 (age 29)	Cafetaleros de Chiapas	4	0
Defenders
2	Conner Antley	(United States)	RB	2021	March 22, 1995 (age 31)	Indy Eleven	32	0
3	Thomas Vancaeyezeele	(France)	CB	2022	July 27, 1994 (age 32)	Birmingham Legion	16	0
5	Jordan Scarlett	(Jamaica)	CB	2020	July 8, 1995 (age 31)	New York Red Bulls II	32	2
24	Robert Castellanos	(United States)	CB	2022	May 11, 1998 (age 28)	Loan from Nashville SC	12	1
33	Aarón Guillén	(Mexico)	LB	2022	June 23, 1993 (age 33)	North Carolina FC	36	0
Midfielders
4	Lewis Hilton	(England)	CM	2020	October 22, 1993 (age 33)	Saint Louis FC	35	2
6	Junior Etou	(Republic of the Congo)	DM	2022	June 1, 1994 (age 32)	Charlotte Independence	23	0
7	Yann Ekra	(France)	CM	2019	October 12, 1990 (age 36)	Charlotte Independence	33	0
8	Jake Areman	(United States)	RM	2022	March 9, 1996 (age 30)	Charlotte Independence	17	1
11	Leo Fernandes	(Brazil)	LM	2017	December 23, 1991 (age 34)	Philadelphia Union	34	20
21	Dayonn Harris	(Canada)	RW	2021	August 29, 1997 (age 29)	Real Monarchs SLC	28	5
23	Sebastian Dalgaard	(Denmark)	WM	2020	August 23, 1991 (age 35)	Hartford Athletic	31	5
27	Laurence Wyke	(England)	DM	2021	September 20, 1996 (age 30)	Atlanta United FC	32	2
Forwards
10	Steevan Dos Santos	(Cape Verde)	CF	2021	September 17, 1989 (age 37)	Pittsburgh Riverhounds SC	23	7
13	Sebastián Guenzatti	(Uruguay)	CF	2017	July 8, 1991 (age 35)	New York Cosmos	32	7
19	Jake LaCava	(United States)	CF	2022	January 21, 2001 (age 25)	Loan from New York Red Bulls	36	12
22	Kyle Greig	(United States)	CF	2022	February 22, 1990 (age 36)	Louisville City FC	20	2
77	Lucky Mkosana	(Zimbabwe)	CF	2019	September 30, 1987 (age 39)	Louisville City FC	22	4

=== Team management and staff ===
Front Office
Owner	(United States) Stuart Sternberg
Vice President	(United States) Ryan Helfrick
Vice chairman	(United States) Matthew Silverman
Vice chairman	(United States) Brian Auld
Technical staff
Head coach/Technical director	(Scotland) Neill Collins
Assistant coach	(England) Stuart Dobson
Assistant coach	(England) Jon Stead
Assistant coach	(United States) Eric Wilde
Performance coach	(United States) Pete Calabrese
Chief scout	(England) Russell Stirling
Medical staff
Head athletic trainer	(United States) Dave Walker
Assistant athletic trainer	(United States) Eric Streich
Orthopedic surgeon	(United States) Dr. Mohit Bansal
Primary care physician	(United States) Dr. Mathew Vermeer

== Competitions ==
=== Exhibitions ===
The Rowdies initial preseason schedule was announced on February 11, 2022. All matches were closed to the public.

February 12, 2022 Preseason	Tampa Bay Rowdies	3–1	FIU Panthers	St. Petersburg, FL
		Report		Stadium: Al Lang Stadium; Attendance: closed-door

February 19, 2022 Preseason	Orlando City SC	3–1	Tampa Bay Rowdies	Orlando, FL
	Akindele 36'; Pereyra 44' (pen.); Lynn 55'		LaCava 21'	Stadium: Undisclosed; Attendance: closed-door

February 23, 2022 Preseason	South Florida Bulls	2–6	Tampa Bay Rowdies	Tampa, FL
		Report		Stadium: Corbett Soccer Stadium; Attendance: closed-door

February 26, 2022 Preseason	North Florida Ospreys	–	Tampa Bay Rowdies	Jacksonville, FL
				Stadium: Hodges Stadium; Attendance: closed-door

March 5, 2022 Preseason	Tampa Bay Rowdies	1–1	Tormenta FC	St. Petersburg, FL
		Report		Stadium: Al Lang Stadium; Attendance: closed-door

=== USL Championship ===
==== Standings — Atlantic Division ====
Pos	Team	Pld	W	L	T	GF	GA	GD	Pts	Qualification
1	Louisville City FC	34	22	6	6	65	28	+37	72	Qualification for the Conference Semifinals
2	Memphis 901 FC	34	21	8	5	67	33	+34	68	Playoffs
3	Tampa Bay Rowdies	34	20	7	7	73	33	+40	67	Playoffs
4	Birmingham Legion FC	34	17	10	7	56	37	+19	58	Playoffs
5	Pittsburgh Riverhounds SC	34	16	9	9	50	38	+12	57	Playoffs
6	Miami FC	34	15	9	10	47	32	+15	55	Playoffs
7	Detroit City FC	34	14	8	12	44	30	+14	54	Playoffs
8	FC Tulsa	34	12	16	6	48	58	−10	42	
9	Indy Eleven	34	12	17	5	41	55	−14	41	
10	Hartford Athletic	34	10	18	6	47	57	−10	36	
11	Loudoun United FC	34	8	22	4	36	74	−38	28	
12	Charleston Battery	34	6	21	7	41	77	−36	25	
13	Atlanta United 2	34	6	23	5	39	85	−46	23	
14	New York Red Bulls II	34	3	25	6	24	76	−52	15	

Source: USL Championship Standings
Rules for classification: 1) head-to-head points; 2) head-to-head goal differential; 3) points-per game within conference; 4) total wins; 5) total goal differential; 6) total goals scored; 7) points earned against top four Conference finishers; 8) disciplinary points; 9) coin toss or drawing of lots

==== Results summary ====
Overall								Home						Away					
Pld	W	D	L	GF	GA	GD	Pts	W	D	L	GF	GA	GD	W	D	L	GF	GA	GD
34	20	7	7	74	33	+41	67	12	3	2	41	13	+28	8	4	5	33	20	+13

Last updated: September 19, 2021.
Source: Match reports

==== Results by round ====
Round	1	2	3	4	5	6	7	8	9	10	11	12	13	14	15	16	17	18	19	20	21	22	23	24	25	26	27	28	29	30	31	32	33	34
Stadium	A	H	A	H	A	H	H	A	A	H	A	H	A	H	A	H	A	H	A	A	H	A	H	A	A	H	H	A	A	H	A	H	H	H
Result	D	W	W	D	D	L	W	D	L	L	W	W	D	W	W	D	W	W	W	W	W	W	W	L	L	W	W	L	L	D	W	W	W	W
Position	6	4	2	3	4	6	5	6	7	7	6	6	6	5	3	3	3	3	3	2	2	2	2	3	3	2	2	3	3	3	3	3	3	3

Updated to match(es) played on October 15, 2022. Source: Match reports
A = Away; H = Home; W = Win; D = Draw; L = Loss

==== Results ====
March 13, 2022 1	Birmingham Legion	1–1	Tampa Bay Rowdies	Birmingham, AL
17:00 EDT (UTC−5)	Lopez (yellow card) 5'; Asiedu (yellow card) 47'; E. Crognale (yellow card) 82'; Marlon 86'; Kasim (yellow card) 88'; Martínez (yellow card) 90+4'	Report	Dalgaard 34', (yellow card) 70'; Guenzatti (yellow card) 43'; Etou (yellow card) 75'	Stadium: BBVA Field; Attendance: 9,277; Referee: Matthew Thompson

March 19, 2022 2	Tampa Bay Rowdies	2–0	Indy Eleven	St. Petersburg, FL
19:30 EDT (UTC−5)	Tejada 1'; Scarlett (yellow card) 11'; Wyke (yellow card) 39'; Guillén (yellow card) 45+1'; LaCava 51'; Etou (yellow card) 76'	Report	Aguilera (yellow card) 18' (yellow-red card) 59'; Stéfano Pinho (yellow card) 53'	Stadium: Al Lang Stadium; Attendance: 5,192; Referee: Jeremy Scheer

March 23, 2022 3	Atlanta United 2	0–3	Tampa Bay Rowdies	Kennesaw, GA
19:30 EDT (UTC−5)	Brick (yellow card) 19'	Report	Dos Santos 20'; Dalgaard 31'; Antley (yellow card) 35'; LaCava 62'; Guillén (yellow card) 64'	Stadium: Fifth Third Bank Stadium; Attendance: 663; Referee: Chris Ruska

March 26, 2022 4	Tampa Bay Rowdies	1–1	Hartford Athletic	St. Petersburg, FL
19:30 EDT (UTC−5)	LaCava 39'; Antley (yellow card) 52'	Report	Johnson 6', (yellow card) 88'; Boudadi (yellow card) 56'; Pack (yellow card) 79'; Barrera (yellow card) 90'; Curry (yellow card) 90+2'	Stadium: Al Lang Stadium; Attendance: 6,061; Referee: Elvis Osmanovic

April 2, 2022 5	Oakland Roots	0–0	Tampa Bay Rowdies	Las Vegas, NV
20:00 EDT (UTC−5)	Fissore (yellow card) 23'; Rito (yellow card) 58'; Hernández (yellow card) 90+1'	Report	Wyke (yellow card) 22'	Stadium: Laney College Football Stadium; Attendance: 4,124; Referee: Luis Guardia

April 9, 2022 6	Tampa Bay Rowdies	0–1	Miami FC	St. Petersburg, FL
19:30 EDT (UTC−5)	Scarlett (yellow card) 54'; Etou (yellow card) 58'	Report	Craig (yellow card) 32'; Bah (yellow card) 49' da Silva 51'; Segbers (yellow card) 65'	Stadium: Al Lang Stadium; Attendance: 4,947; Referee: Kevin Broadley

April 16, 2022 7	Tampa Bay Rowdies	3–1	FC Tulsa	St. Petersburg, FL
19:30 EDT (UTC−5)	Hilton 3'; Antley (yellow card) 22'; Guenzatti (penalty missed) 25'; Greig 37'; Harris 87'	Report	Williams 85'	Stadium: Al Lang Stadium; Attendance: 5,067; Referee: Elijio Arreguin

April 23, 2022 8	New York Red Bulls II	1–1	Tampa Bay Rowdies	Montclair, NJ
19:30 EDT (UTC−5)	Cragwell (yellow card) 67'; Rafanello (yellow card) 36', (goal) 45+2'; Sserwadda (yellow card) 24'	Report	Wyke (yellow card) 5'; Fernandes 85'	Stadium: MSU Soccer Park at Pittser Field; Attendance: 314; Referee: Matthew Thompson

April 27, 2022 9	Memphis 901 FC	3–1	Tampa Bay Rowdies	Memphis, TN
20:00 EDT (UTC−5)	Goodrum 1', (yellow card) 45'; Dodson 45+2'; Paul (yellow card) 68'; Allan 85'	Report	Hilton 4'; Harris (yellow card) 11'; Guillén (yellow card) 29'; Dos Santos (yellow card) 38' (yellow-red card) 58'	Stadium: AutoZone Park; Referee: Jervis Atagana

April 30, 2022 10	Tampa Bay Rowdies	2–3	San Diego Loyal	St. Petersburg, FL
19:30 EDT (UTC−5)	LaCava 21'; Guenzatti 41'; Antley (yellow card) 79'; Mehl (yellow card) 90'; Scarlett (yellow card) 90+5'	Report	Moon 19'; Adams (yellow card) 47'; Martin (yellow card) 50'; Blake 75'; Martin (yellow card) 86'; Guido (yellow card) 87'; Conway 88'	Stadium: Al Lang Stadium; Attendance: 5,039; Referee: Sergii Demianchuk

May 15, 2022 11	Phoenix Rising FC	1–5	Tampa Bay Rowdies	Chandler, AZ
22:00 EDT (UTC−5)	Seijas 15'; Farrell (yellow card) 39' (yellow-red card) 69'	Report	LaCava 24'; Harris 36' (yellow card) 41'; Areman 45+3'; Haugli 47' (o.g.); Hilton (yellow card) 59'; Flood 68' (o.g.); Wyke (yellow card) 86'	Stadium: Wild Horse Pass Stadium; Attendance: 7,115; Referee: Matthew Franz

May 21, 2022 12	Tampa Bay Rowdies	3–1	Pittsburgh Riverhounds	St. Petersburg, FL
19:30 EDT (UTC−5)	LaCava 36'; Scarlett (yellow card) 39'; Fernandes 57'; Wyke (yellow card) 61'; Guillén (yellow card) 66'; Mkosana 90+4'	Report	Osuna (yellow card) 5'; Dixon 10', (yellow card) 48'; Rovira (yellow card) 67'	Stadium: Al Lang Stadium; Attendance: 5,102; Referee: Eric Tattersall

June 1, 2022 13	FC Tulsa	1–1	Tampa Bay Rowdies	Tulsa, OK
20:30 EDT (UTC−5)	Williams (yellow card) 2'; Torres (yellow card) 45+3'; Diz (yellow card) 72' da Costa 83'; Suárez (yellow card) 90'	Report	Wyke 17'; Scarlett (yellow card) 33'; Vancaeyezeele (yellow card) 84'	Stadium: Oneok Field; Attendance: 2,549; Referee: Matthew Corrigan

June 5, 2022 14	Tampa Bay Rowdies	1–0	Louisville City	St. Petersburg, FL
19:30 EDT (UTC−5)	Fernandes (penalty scored) 43'; LaCava (yellow card) 70'; Tejada (yellow card) 90'; Guillén (yellow card) 90+2'	Report		Stadium: Al Lang Stadium; Attendance: 4,119; Referee: Matthew Conger

June 11, 2022 15	Miami FC	1–2	Tampa Bay Rowdies	Miami, FL
19:00 EDT (UTC−5)	Chapman-Page (yellow card) 19'; Valot (yellow card) 23'; Bah (yellow card) 47', (goal) 65'	Report	Scarlett (yellow card) 3'; Akinyode 33' (o.g.); Ekra (yellow card) 38'; Fernandes (penalty scored) 48'; Etou (yellow card) 87'; Guillén (yellow card) 88'	Stadium: Riccardo Silva Stadium; Attendance: 1,382; Referee: Elvis Osmanovic

June 18, 2022 16	Tampa Bay Rowdies	1–1	Charleston Battery	St. Petersburg, FL
19:30 EDT (UTC−5)	Guillén (yellow card) 14'; Fernandes 34'; Hilton (yellow card) 42'	Report	Williams (yellow card) 20', (goal) 63'; Schmidt (yellow card) 69'	Stadium: Al Lang Stadium; Attendance: 4,569; Referee: Alejo Calume

June 25, 2022 17	Pittsburgh Riverhounds	2–5	Tampa Bay Rowdies	Pittsburgh, PA
19:00 EDT (UTC−5)	Osuna 13', (yellow card) 73'; Cicerone 75'	Report	Greig 15'; Fernandes 20', 57'; LaCava 41'; Hilton (yellow card) 55'; Mkosana 64'	Stadium: Highmark Stadium; Attendance: 3,888; Referee: Adam Kilpatrick

July 2, 2022 18	Tampa Bay Rowdies	2–0	Memphis 901 FC	St. Petersburg, FL
19:30 EDT (UTC−5)	LaCava 3', 19'; Fernandes (penalty missed) 30'; Wyke (yellow card) 52'	Report	Lucas Turci (yellow card) 8' (yellow-red card) 60'; Paul (yellow card) 65'	Stadium: Al Lang Stadium; Attendance: 6,175; Referee: Kevin Broadley

July 9, 2022 19	Hartford Athletic	2–3	Tampa Bay Rowdies	Hartford, CT
19:00 EDT (UTC−5)	Gdula (yellow card) 32'; Barrera 49'; Dally 56'; Oettl (yellow card) 90+7'	Report	Dalgaard 36'; Vancaeyezeele (yellow card) 61'; Wyke (yellow card) 62'; Dos Santos (yellow card) 64'; Fernandes (penalty scored) 73', (penalty scored) 90+8'; Scarlett (red card) 90+2'	Stadium: Dillon Stadium; Attendance: 5,090; Referee: Joshua Encarnación

July 16, 2022 20	Loudoun United FC	1–4	Tampa Bay Rowdies	Leesburg, VA
19:30 EDT (UTC−5)	Freeman 80'	Report	LaCava 64'; Dos Santos 68'; Fernandes 73'; Dalgaard 82'	Stadium: Segra Field; Attendance: 1,613; Referee: Esad Omanovic

July 23, 2022 21	Tampa Bay Rowdies	3–1	Atlanta United 2	St. Petersburg, FL
19:30 EDT (UTC−5)	Dos Santos 25', 38', (yellow card) 45+2'; Wyke (yellow card) 47'; Fernandes 68' (pen.); Harris (yellow card) 85'	Report	Matheus 14'; Morales (yellow card) 15'; Raimar (yellow card) 30'	Stadium: Al Lang Stadium; Attendance: 4,890; Referee: Adam Kilpatrick

July 30, 2022 22	Indy Eleven	1–3	Tampa Bay Rowdies	Indianapolis, IN
19:00 EDT (UTC−5)	Aguilera 24', (yellow card) 34'; Tejada (yellow card) 54'; Ayoze (yellow card) 80'; Rebellón (yellow card) 82'; Rivera (yellow card) 90+1'	Report	Law (yellow card) 16'; Dos Santos (penalty scored) 32', (yellow card) 50'; Scarlett 45'; Fernandes (penalty scored) 90+6'	Stadium: Michael A. Carroll Stadium; Attendance: 10,074; Referee: Joshua Encarnación

August 6, 2022 23	Tampa Bay Rowdies	1–0	Detroit City FC	St. Petersburg, FL
19:30 EDT (UTC−5)	Wyke (yellow card) 42'; Dos Santos 64'	Report		Stadium: Al Lang Stadium; Attendance: 5,104; Referee: Alyssa Nichols

August 13, 2022 24	Louisville City	1–0	Tampa Bay Rowdies	Louisville, KY
19:30 EDT (UTC−5)	Gibson (yellow card) 29'; Harris 63'	Report	Guillén (yellow card) 50'	Stadium: Lynn Family Stadium; Attendance: 14,673; Referee: Natalie Simon

August 20, 2022 25	Colorado Springs Switchbacks	1–0	Tampa Bay Rowdies	Colorado Springs, CO
21:00 EDT (UTC−5)	Lindley (yellow card) 12'; Amoh (yellow card) 15'; Echevarria (yellow card) 22'; Foster (yellow card) 45+1'; Erdmann (yellow card) 45+3'; Henriquez 66'	Report	Antley (yellow card) 8'; Harris (yellow card) 39'; Dos Santos (yellow card) 89'	Stadium: Weidner Field; Attendance: 6,887; Referee: Mark Allatin

August 27, 2022 26	Tampa Bay Rowdies	3–1	Orange County SC	St. Petersburg, FL
19:30 EDT (UTC−5)	Fernandes 15'; Ekra (yellow card) 21' (yellow-red card) 56'; Hoffmann 43' (o.g.); Wyke (yellow card) 66'; Cochran (yellow card) 89'; Harris 89'	Report	Orozco (yellow card) 7'; Villanueva (yellow card) 55'; Iloski 57'	Stadium: Al Lang Stadium; Attendance: 6,714; Referee: Matthew Thompson

September 3, 2022 27	Tampa Bay Rowdies	6–1	Las Vegas Lights	St. Petersburg, FL
19:30 EDT (UTC−5)	Scarlett 24'; Etou (yellow card) 33'; Fernandes 37', 66'; LaCava 51'; Dos Santos (yellow card) 74', (goal) 87'; Mkosana 90+2'	Report	Crisostomo (yellow card) 1'; Lara (yellow card) 33'; Jennings 60'	Stadium: Al Lang Stadium; Attendance: 4,485; Referee: Thomas Snyder

September 10, 2022 28	Charleston Battery	2–1	Tampa Bay Rowdies	Charleston, SC
19:00 EDT (UTC−5)	Booth 21', 67'; Cichero (yellow card) 30'; Piggott (yellow card) 51'; Fauroux (yellow card) 90+3'	Report	Guenzatti 3'; LaCava (yellow card) 45+2'; Etou (yellow card) 52'; Castellanos (yellow card) 75'	Stadium: Patriots Point Soccer Complex; Attendance: 2,973; Referee: Luis Arroyo

September 17, 2022 29	Detroit City FC	1–0	Tampa Bay Rowdies	Hamtramck, MI
19:30 EDT (UTC−5)	Wynne (yellow card) 62'; Hoppenot 81'; Foster (yellow card) 90+1'	Report		Stadium: Keyworth Stadium; Attendance: 6,856; Referee: Kevin Broadley

September 23, 2022 30	Tampa Bay Rowdies	1–1	Birmingham Legion	St. Petersburg, FL
19:30 EDT (UTC−5)	Fernandes 17'; Guillén (yellow card) 42'	Report	Marlon 10'; A. Crognale (yellow card) 13'; Lopez (yellow card) 24'; Bruno Lapa (yellow card) 45+2'; Herivaux (yellow card) 70'	Stadium: Al Lang Stadium; Attendance: 5,150; Referee: Adam Kilpatrick

October 2, 2022 31	Monterey Bay FC	1–2	Tampa Bay Rowdies	Seaside, CA
22:00 EDT (UTC−5)	Gleadle 22'	Report	Law 49', (yellow card) 87'; Wyke 67'; Castellanos (yellow card) 87'; Fernandes (red card) 90+7'	Stadium: Cardinale Stadium; Attendance: 5,705; Referee: Melvin Rivas

October 8, 2022 32	Tampa Bay Rowdies	8–0	Loudoun United FC	St. Petersburg, FL
19:30 EDT (UTC−5)	Guenzatti (penalty scored) 19', 61'; Castellanos 23'; LaCava 45+1'; Dalgaard 64'; Mkosana 83'; Harris 87', 90+3'	Report	Houssou (yellow card) 9'; Downs (yellow card) 49'; Koffi (yellow card) 73'; Freeman (yellow card) 90+1'; Zamudio (yellow card) 90+4'	Stadium: Al Lang Stadium; Attendance: 5,147; Referee: Eric Tattersall

October 12, 2022 33	Tampa Bay Rowdies	3–1	El Paso Locomotive	St. Petersburg, FL
19:30 EDT (UTC−5)	Fernandes 16', (penalty missed) 68', 90+1'; Scarlett (yellow card) 29'; Guenzatti 43'	Report	Egiluz 72'; Ryan (yellow card) 83'; Rose (yellow card) 85'; Maldonado (yellow card) 89'	Stadium: Al Lang Stadium; Attendance: 3,454; Referee: Sergii Demianchuk

October 15, 2022 34	Tampa Bay Rowdies	1–0	New York Red Bulls II	St. Petersburg, FL
19:30 EDT (UTC−5)	Fernandes 37'	Report	Wise (yellow card) 15'; Plaza (yellow card) 34'; Alexandre (yellow card) 45+2'; Valencia (red card) 74'; Castellano (yellow card) 84'; Salinas (yellow card) 87'	Stadium: Al Lang Stadium; Attendance: 6,293; Referee: Jeremy Scheer

=== USL Championship playoffs ===
==== Bracket ====
Conference Quarter-finals; October 22–23	Conference Semi-finals; October 28–30
E1	Louisville City (p)	2 (5)
E5	Pittsburgh Riverhounds	2 (3)
E4	Birmingham Legion	2 (7)
E5	Pittsburgh Riverhounds (p)	2 (8)
Eastern Conference
E2	Memphis 901	3
E7	Detroit City	1
E2	Memphis 901	0
E3	Tampa Bay Rowdies	1
E3	Tampa Bay Rowdies	3
E6	Miami FC	1
W1	San Antonio FC	3
W7	Oakland Roots	0
W2	San Diego Loyal	0
W7	Oakland Roots	3
Western Conference
W3	Colorado Springs Switchbacks	3
W6	Rio Grande Valley FC	0
W3	Colorado Springs Switchbacks (a.e.t.)	2
W4	Sacramento Republic	1
W4	Sacramento Republic	2
W5	New Mexico United	0

Conference Finals; November 5–6
E1	Louisville City	1
E3	Tampa Bay Rowdies	0
W1	San Antonio FC	2
W3	Colorado Springs Switchbacks	0

USL Championship Final; November 13
E1	Louisville City	1
W1	San Antonio FC	3

==== Results ====
October 22, 2022 EC Quarterfinal	Tampa Bay Rowdies	3–1	Miami FC	St. Petersburg, Florida
19:30 EDT (UTC−5)	Guenzatti 50', 70'; Law 59'	Report	Rivas 55'	Stadium: Al Lang Stadium; Attendance: 5,937; Referee: Calin Radosav

October 30, 2022 EC Quarterfinal	Memphis 901	0–1	Tampa Bay Rowdies	Memphis, Tennessee
3:00 PM CDT		Report	Fernandes 90+9' (pen.)	Stadium: AutoZone Park; Referee: Elton Garcia
Note: Match rescheduled from October 29 due to weather.

November 5, 2022 EC Final	Louisville City	1–0 (a.e.t.)	Tampa Bay Rowdies	Louisville, Kentucky
7:30 PM EDT	Totsch (yellow card) 48'; Bone (red card) 82'; Charpie (yellow card) 100'; Wynder 108'	Report	Hilton (yellow card) 84'; Harris (yellow card) 90+3'; Dos Santos (yellow card) 106'	Stadium: Lynn Family Stadium; Attendance: 11,563; Referee: Mark Allatin

=== U.S. Open Cup ===
April 5, 2022 Second Round	Tampa Bay Rowdies (Florida)	6–0	(Florida) The Villages SC	St. Petersburg, Florida
7:30 pm EDT	Mkosana 12', 20', 53'; Scarlett 36'; LaCava 63'; Wyke 72'	Report		Stadium: Al Lang Stadium; Referee: Alex Billeter

April 20, 2022 Third Round	Orlando City SC (Florida)	2–1	(Florida) Tampa Bay Rowdies	Orlando, Florida
7:00 pm EDT	Pato 52'; Urso 63'		Mkosana 65'	Stadium: Exploria Stadium
Note: Game originally scheduled to be played at Osceola County Stadium in Kissimmee, Florida. Location changed on April 11.
