= 2024 Tampa Bay Rowdies season =

Tampa Bay Rowdies
2024 season
- Chairman: Stuart Sternberg
- Head coach: Robbie Neilson
- Stadium: Al Lang Stadium
- USL Championship: Conference: 6th
- USL Cup: Eastern Conference Semi-Final
- U.S. Open Cup: Round of 32
- Biggest win: 5–1 (May 13 vs DCFC)
- Biggest defeat: 3–0 (March 25 vs CHS)
Home colors	Away colors	Third colors

The 2024 Tampa Bay Rowdies season was the club's fifteenth season of existence, their eighth in the United Soccer League, and sixth in the USL Championship. Including the previous Tampa Bay Rowdies, this is their 31st season of a franchise in the Tampa Bay metro area with the Rowdies moniker. Including the now-defunct Tampa Bay Mutiny, this is the 36th season of professional soccer in the Tampa Bay region.

During the offseason, the Rowdies hired Scotsman Robbie Neilson in November 2023 as their new head coach, after former head coach Neill Collins left the club mid-season to manage Barnsley FC in the EFL League One.

== Club ==
=== Roster ===
As of July 22, 2024

Squad No.	Name	Nationality	Position(s)	Since	Date of birth (age)	Signed from	Games played	Goals scored
Goalkeepers
1	Jordan Farr	(United States)	GK	2024	October 5, 1994 (age 31)	San Antonio FC		0
15	Phil Breno	(United States)	GK	2022	December 11, 1995 (age 30)	Permanent deal from Forward Madison FC		0
99	Taner Akin	(United States)	GK	2024	September 30, 2006 (age 19)	Fatih Karagümrük S.K.		0
Defenders
3	Forrest Lasso	(United States)	CB	2023	May 11, 1993 (age 32)	GIF Sundsvall		
19	Freddy Kleemann	(United States)	CB	2023	March 19, 1999 (age 26)	Birmingham Legion FC		
33	Aarón Guillén	(Mexico)	LB	2020	June 23, 1993 (age 32)	North Carolina FC		
34	Matheus De Jesus	(United States)	CB	2024	December 16, 2005 (age 20)	Tampa Bay Rowdies U23		
42	Zane Bubb	(United States)	RB	2024	January 11, 2000 (age 26)	University of Central Florida Knights		
Midfielders
4	Lewis Hilton	(England)	CM	2020	October 22, 1993 (age 32)	Saint Louis FC		
5	Joey DeZart	(Jamaica)	CM	2024	June 9, 1998 (age 27)	Huntsville City FC		
10	Leo Fernandes	(Brazil)	LM	2017	December 23, 1991 (age 34)	Philadelphia Union		
11	Blake Bodily	(United States)	CM	2024	January 13, 1998 (age 28)	San Diego Loyal		
17	Daniel Crisostomo	(United States)	CM	2024	January 16, 1997 (age 29)	Los Angeles FC 2		
18	Nathan Worth	(United States)	CM	2024	February 26, 2007 (age 19)	FC Tulsa		
22	Jordan Doherty	(Republic of Ireland)	DM	2023	August 29, 2000 (age 25)	Bohemian		
24	Nick Skubis	(United States)	WM	2024	July 20, 2005 (age 20)	Tampa Bay United SC		
30	Amari Fowlkes	(United States)	DM	2024	May 30, 2005 (age 20)	Indiana Fire		
Forwards
8	Damian Rivera	(Costa Rica)	CF	2024	December 8, 2002 (age 23)	On Loan from New England Revolution II		
9	Manuel Arteaga	(Venezuela)	CF	2024	June 17, 1994 (age 31)	Phoenix Rising FC		
16	Jake LaCava	(United States)	CF	2023	January 12, 2001 (age 25)	Loan from Inter Miami		
23	Eddie Munjoma	(United States)	LW	2024	July 18, 1998 (age 27)	Phoenix Rising FC		
26	Cal Jennings	(United States)	CF	2023	May 17, 1997 (age 28)	Los Angeles FC		
27	Pacifique Niyongabire	(Burundi)	RW	2024	March 15, 2000 (age 25)	Valour FC		
98	Joshua Pérez	(El Salvador)	RW	2023	January 21, 1998 (age 28)	Montevarchi		

=== Team management and staff ===
Front Office
Owner	(United States) Stuart Sternberg
Head of Soccer Operations	(Argentina) Nico Castillo
Vice President	(United States) Ryan Helfrick
Vice chairman	(United States) Matthew Silverman
Vice chairman	(United States) Brian Auld

Coaching Staff
Head Coach	(Scotland) Robbie Neilson
Goalkeeping Coach	(England) Stuart Dobson
Assistant Coach	(England) Nicky Law
Assistant Coach	(England) Russell Stirling
Performance Coach	(Colombia) Carlos Wheeler

== Competitions ==
=== USL Championship ===
==== Standings ====
Pos	Team	Pld	W	L	T	GF	GA	GD	Pts	Qualification
4	Indy Eleven	34	14	11	9	49	50	−1	51	Playoffs
5	Rhode Island FC	34	12	7	15	56	41	+15	51	Playoffs
6	Tampa Bay Rowdies	34	14	12	8	55	46	+9	50	Playoffs
7	Pittsburgh Riverhounds SC	34	12	10	12	41	28	+13	48	Playoffs
8	North Carolina FC	34	13	12	9	54	43	+11	48	Playoffs

Source: USL Championship Standings
Rules for classification: 1) head-to-head points; 2) head-to-head goal differential; 3) points-per game within conference; 4) total wins; 5) total goal differential; 6) total goals scored; 7) points earned against top four Conference finishers; 8) disciplinary points; 9) coin toss or drawing of lots

==== Match results ====
On December 18, 2023, the USL Championship released the regular season schedule for all 24 teams.

All times are in Eastern Standard Time.

===== March =====
March 16 1	Tampa Bay Rowdies	2–2	San Antonio FC	St. Petersburg, Florida
6:30 PM	Jennings 4', (yellow card) 16'; Lasso (yellow card) 19'; Bodily (yellow card) 28'; Crisostomo (yellow card) 45'; Arteaga 72'	Report	Hernández (yellow card) 14'; Lacey (yellow card) 66'; Sisniega (yellow card) 72'; Haakenson (yellow card) 76'; Bura 83'; Manley 90+1'	Stadium: Al Lang Stadium; Attendance: 7,500; Referee: Alexis Da Silva

March 23 2	North Carolina FC	1–1	Tampa Bay Rowdies	Cary, North Carolina
7:00 PM	Mentzingen 75'	Report	Maldonado 63' (o.g.); Dezart (yellow card) 90'+3'	Stadium: WakeMed Soccer Park; Attendance: 1,796; Referee: John Griggs

March 30 3	Tampa Bay Rowdies	4–1	Rhode Island FC	St. Petersburg, Florida
7:30 PM	Hilton (yellow card) 1'; Guillén (yellow card) 53'; Arteaga 54'; Jennings 61' (yellow card) 67'; Doherty 72'; Munjoma (yellow card) 75'; Ortiz (yellow card) 90+3'; Rivera 90+6'	Report	Dikwa 16' (yellow card) 46'; McGlynn (yellow card) 45+3'	Stadium: Al Lang Stadium; Attendance: 6,001; Referee: Elvis Osmanovic

===== April =====
April 6 4	Pittsburgh Riverhounds SC	0–0	Tampa Bay Rowdies	Pittsburgh, Pennsylvania
7:00PM	Sample (yellow card) 89'	Report	Guillén (yellow card) 17'	Stadium: Highmark Stadium; Attendance: 3,109; Referee: Adam Kilpatrick

April 11 5	Miami FC	2–5	Tampa Bay Rowdies	Miami, Florida
7:00 PM	Vang (yellow card) 17'; Gabriel Cabral (yellow card) 32'; Rocco Genzano 48'; Gavilanes 55'; Botta (yellow card) 56' (yellow-red card) 73'; Khadim Ndiaye (yellow card) 86'	Report	Arteaga (yellow card) 14' (goal) 62'; Jennings 39' 52'; Bodily 45+4'; Hilton (yellow card) 49'; Munjoma (yellow card) 64'	Stadium: FIU Soccer Stadium; Attendance: 887; Referee: (United States) Calin Radosav

April 20 6	Tampa Bay Rowdies	1–1	El Paso Locomotive FC	St. Petersburg, Florida
7:30	Pérez (yellow card) 18'; Arteaga 73'; Munjoma (yellow card) 83'	Report	Cavillo (yellow card) 1'; Nevárez (yellow card) 8' (goal) 64'; Alfaro (yellow card) 9'; Rose (yellow card) 55'	Stadium: Al Lang Stadium; Attendance: 4,945; Referee: Alex Beehler

April 27 7	Tampa Bay Rowdies	3–0	New Mexico United	St. Petersburg, Florida
7:30 PM	Jennings 7' 16'; Pérez (yellow card) 28'; Crisostomo (yellow card) 43'; Bodily (yellow card) 52'; Arteaga 58' (pen.)	Report	Hurst (yellow card) 45'+1'; Micaletto (yellow card) 65'	Stadium: Al Lang Stadium; Attendance: 6,588; Referee: Abdou Ndiaye

===== May =====
May 4 8	Memphis 901 FC	4–1	Tampa Bay Rowdies	Memphis, Tennessee
4:00 PM	Marlon 19', 50'; Fernando 23'; Borczak 64'; Careaga (yellow card) 75'; Pickering (yellow card) 81'; Ward (yellow card) 90'+2'	Report	Lasso (red card) 11'; Guillen (yellow card) 24'; Arteaga (yellow card) 29' (goal) 45'+6'; Niyongabire (yellow card) 54'	Stadium: AutoZone Park; Attendance: 2,384; Referee: Alexis Da Silva

May 11 9	Tampa Bay Rowdies	0–1	Birmingham Legion FC	St. Petersburg, Florida
7:30 PM	Guillen (yellow card) 80'	Report	Kavita (yellow card) 9'; Murana (yellow card) 32'; Hernandez-Foster (yellow card) 37'; Martínez 67'; Pasher (yellow card) 90'+1'	Stadium: Al Lang Stadium; Attendance: 5,433; Referee: Elton García

May 18 10	Tampa Bay Rowdies	5–0	FC Tulsa	St. Petersburg, Florida
7:30 PM	Arteaga 12' 45'+2' (pen.); Jennings 22'; Lasso 40', 71'; Worth (yellow card) 84'	Report	Laszo (yellow card) 45'+1'; Diallo (yellow card) 60'; Dalou (yellow card) 90'+1'	Stadium: Al Lang Stadium; Attendance: 5,277; Referee: Eric Tattersall

May 25 11	Tampa Bay Rowdies	1–0	Las Vegas Lights FC	St. Petersburg, Florida
7:30 PM	Munjoma (yellow card) 56'; Worth (yellow card) 81'; Jennings 85'	Report	Nigro (yellow card) 31'; Smart (yellow card) 68'; Azcona (yellow card) 71'	Stadium: Al Lang Stadium; Attendance: 5,753; Referee: Sergii Demianchuk

===== June =====
June 1 12	Sacramento Republic FC	0–1	Tampa Bay Rowdies	Sacramento, California
10:00 PM	Sanchez (yellow card) 86'	Report	Dennis 53'; Guillen (yellow card) 90'+7'	Stadium: Heart Health Park; Attendance: 9,547; Referee: Gerald Flores

June 8 13	Oakland Roots SC	1–0	Tampa Bay Rowdies	Hayward, California
10:00 PM	Cedeno 72'; Dwyer (yellow card) 83'; Nije (penalty missed) 90'+6	Report		Stadium: Pioneer Stadium; Attendance: 6,408; Referee: Elijio Arreguin

June 15 14	Tampa Bay Rowdies	3–2	Louisville City FC	St. Petersburg, Florida
7:30 PM	Pérez (yellow card) 11'; Jennings 30'; Arteaga 36' (pen.); Munjoma (yellow card) 73'; Niyongabire (yellow card) 87'; Rivera 90+2'; Guillén (yellow card) 90+4'; Dennis (yellow card) 90+5'	Report	Gonzalez (yellow card) 25', (goal) 51'; Jake Morris (yellow card) 42'; McFadden 45+5'; Ordoñez (yellow card) 68'; Dia (yellow card) 90+5'	Stadium: Al Lang Stadium; Attendance: 5,393; Referee: Ricardo Fierro; Assistant referees: Ben Rigel; Juan Pablo Casas; Fourth official: Mario Maric

June 21 15	Hartford Athletic	0–1	Tampa Bay Rowdies	Hartford, Connecticut
7:30 PM	Makangila (yellow card) 9' (yellow-red card) 43'	Report	Dennis (yellow card) 2'; Farr (yellow card) 66'; Arteaga 87' (pen.)	Stadium: Trinity Health Stadium; Attendance: 5,500; Referee: Greg Dopka

June 29 16	Loudoun United FC	2–0	Tampa Bay Rowdies	Leesburg, Virginia
7:30 PM	Aboukoura 15'; Tingey (yellow card) 57'; Fauroux (yellow card) 73'; Leggett (yellow card) 77' (goal) 90'	Report		Stadium: Segra Field; Attendance: 3,076; Referee: Luis Arroyo

===== July =====
July 6 17	Detroit City FC	1–1	Tampa Bay Rowdies	Hamtramck, Michigan
7:00 PM	Murphy (yellow card) 41'; Diop (yellow card) 41' (yellow-red card) 59'; Dichio (yellow card) 60'; Amoh 71'; Rodriguez (yellow card) 75'	Report	Arteaga (yellow card) 45+4'; Kleemann (yellow card) 51'; Moon 90+4'	Stadium: Keyworth Stadium; Attendance: 6,403; Referee: Muhammad Hassan

July 13 18	Tampa Bay Rowdies	2–0	Orange County SC	St. Petersburg, Florida
7:30 PM	Jennings 6' 30'; Crisostomo (yellow card) 67'; Kleemann (yellow card) 83'	Report	Norris (yellow card) 43' (yellow-red card) 52'	Stadium: Al Lang Stadium; Attendance: 5,971; Referee: Eric Tattersall

July 20 19	Indy Eleven	0–2	Tampa Bay Rowdies	Indianapolis, IN
7:00 PM	Wooton (yellow card) 33'	Report	Crisostomo (yellow card) 13'; Jennings 36'; Rivera 80'	Stadium: Carroll Stadium; Attendance: 10,636; Referee: Thomas Snyder

July 27 20	Tampa Bay Rowdies	4–2	Charleston Battery	St. Petersburg, Florida
7:30 PM	Arteaga 38' (pen.) (yellow card) 90'+6'; Crisostomo (yellow card) 44'; Pérez 46' (yellow card) 55'; Munjoma (yellow card) 76'; Worth 87'; Rivera 90'+12'	Report	Torres 8' (yellow card) 29'; Smith 13' (yellow card) 90'+7'; Grinwis (red card) 83'	Stadium: Al Lang Stadium; Attendance: 5,705; Referee: John Griggs

===== August =====
August 3 21	Monterey Bay FC	2–2	Tampa Bay Rowdies	Seaside, California
10:00 PM	Gnaulati (yellow card) 26'; Dixon 29'; Guzmán (yellow card) 45'+1'; Ngnepi (yellow card) 61'; Trager 90'+2'	Report	Kleemann (yellow card) 9'; Guillen (yellow card) 54'; Jennings 71'; Arteaga 84' (pen.)	Stadium: Cardinale Stadium; Attendance: 4,024; Referee: Nabil Bensalah

August 10 22	Phoenix Rising FC	0–0	Tampa Bay Rowdies	Phoenix, Arizona
10:00 PM	Dennis (yellow card) 61'; John (yellow card) 90'	Report	Joshua (yellow card) 3'; Crisostomo (yellow card) 55'	Stadium: Phoenix Rising Soccer Stadium; Referee: Abdou Ndiaye

August 17 23	Tampa Bay Rowdies	0–2	Loudoun United FC	St. Petersburg, Florida
	Bodily (yellow card) 17' (yellow-red card) 61'	Report	Dambrot (yellow card) 28'; Leggett 34'; Leerman (yellow card) 53'; Ryan 69'; Aboukoura (yellow card) 90'+1'	Stadium: Al Lang Stadium; Referee: Elijio Arreguin

August 21 24	Tampa Bay Rowdies	2–3	Detroit City FC	St. Petersburg, Florida
7:30 PM	Bubb (yellow card) 27' (goal) 36'; Arteaga (yellow card) 45+6' (goal) 90+3'; Fernandes (yellow card) 82'	Report	Amoo-Mensah 3' (yellow card) 42'; Rutz (yellow card) 23'; Rh. Williams (yellow card) 29'; Carroll (yellow card) 44'; Morris 58', 74'; Bryant (yellow card) 81'	Stadium: Al Lang Stadium; Attendance: 3,159; Referee: Ricardo Montero

August 24 25	Tampa Bay Rowdies	2–0	Miami FC	St. Petersburg, Florida
	Arteaga (yellow card) 45'+2' (goal) 61'; Niyongabire (yellow card) 45'+4'; Kleemann (yellow card) 48'; Jennings (yellow card) 70'; Rivera 72'	Report	Roberto Molina (yellow card) 37'; Dezart (yellow card) 67'; Cardona (yellow card) 85'	Stadium: Al Lang Stadium; Attendance: 6,310; Referee: John Matto

===== September =====
September 7 26	Colorado Springs Switchbacks FC	4–2	Tampa Bay Rowdies	Colorado Springs, Colorado
9:00 PM	Pierre (yellow card) 20'; Bodily 28' (o.g.); Magee 42'; Dhillon 47'; Hanya 53'	Report	Spaulding (yellow card) 10'; Fernandes 74'; Bodily (yellow card) 76'; Rivera 79'; Guillen (yellow card) 86'	Stadium: Weidner Field; Attendance: 7,362; Referee: Jeremy Scheer

September 11 27	Birmingham Legion FC	2–0	Tampa Bay Rowdies	Birmingham, Alabama
7:00 PM	Hernandez-Foster (yellow card) 13' (goal) 86'; Pinho (yellow card) 32' (goal) 36'; Mensah (yellow card) 43'; Dodson (yellow card) 48'; Nwegbo (yellow card) 58'	Report	Kleemann (yellow card) 55'; Crisostomo (yellow card) 71'	Stadium: Protective Stadium; Attendance: 5,058; Referee: Lorenzo Hernandez

September 14 28	Tampa Bay Rowdies	2-1	Pittsburgh Riverhounds SC	St. Petersburg, FL
7:30 PM	Munjoma (yellow card) 45'+2'; Bodily (yellow card) 53'; Bubb (yellow card) 56'; Arteaga 71'; Fernandes (yellow card) 76' (goal) 90'+1'	Report	Walti 43'; Kizza (yellow card) 67'	Stadium: Al Lang Stadium; Attendance: 4,851; Referee: Brandon Stevis

September 21 29	Charleston Battery	3-1	Tampa Bay Rowdies	Mount Pleasant, South Carolina
7:00 PM	Torres 5'; Markanich 37', 60'; Dossantos (yellow card) 43'; Segbers (yellow card) 59'	Report	Kleemann (yellow card) 8' (goal) 81'; Worth (yellow card) 61'; Pérez (yellow card) 79'; Guillen (yellow card) 90'+4'	Stadium: Patriots Point Soccer Complex; Attendance: 4,366; Referee: Abdou Ndiaye

September 28 30	Tampa Bay Rowdies	v	Hartford Athletic	St. Petersburg, FL
7:30 PM		Report		Stadium: Al Lang Stadium
Note: Postponed due to Hurricane Helene

===== October =====
October 5 31	Rhode Island FC	3–1	Tampa Bay Rowdies	Smithfield, RI
7:30PM	Herivaux 21'; Williams (yellow card) 29' (goal) 85'; Fuson 69'; Holstad (yellow card) 77'; Ybarra (yellow card) 81'	Report	Hilton (yellow card) 27'; Niyongabire (yellow card) 65'; Arteaga 71'	Stadium: Beirne Stadium; Attendance: 3,991; Referee: Elton Garcia

October 12 32	Louisville City FC	2–1	Tampa Bay Rowdies	Louisville, Kentucky
7:30 PM	Totsh 71' (pen.); Goodrum (yellow card) 73'; Ordoñez 90+6'	Report	Hilton (yellow card) 20', (goal) 61'; Niyongabire (yellow card) 68'; Arteaga (yellow card) 69'; Neilson (red card) 69'; Fernandes (yellow card) 90+4'	Stadium: Lynn Family Stadium; Attendance: 9,940; Referee: Elijio Arreguin; Assistant referees: John Krill; Tom Felice; Fourth official: Benjamin Meyer

October 19 33	Tampa Bay Rowdies	0-2	North Carolina FC	Cary, North Carolina
7:30 PM	Bodily (yellow card) 35'; Niyongabire (yellow card) 81'	Report	Conway (yellow card) 41' (goal) 70'; Anderson 49'; Craig (yellow card) 60'; Niyongabire (yellow card) 81'	Stadium: WakeMed Soccer Park; Referee: Greg Dopka
Note: Match was to be played in St. Petersburg, but due to the effects of Hurricane Helene and Hurricane Milton, the match was moved to North Carolina, with Tampa retaining the "Home" side label

October 23 30	Tampa Bay Rowdies	2-2	Hartford Athletic	Bradenton, Florida
7:30 PM	Fernandes 21'; Moon (yellow card) 23'; Jennings (yellow card) 45'+5' (goal) 64'; Bender (yellow card) 87'; Arteaga (yellow card) 90'+6'	Report	Epps 14'; Mamadou 45'+6'; Farrell (yellow card) 53'; Boudadi (yellow card) 90'	Stadium: IMG Academy Soccer Stadium; Attendance: 223
Note: Match postponed due to Hurricane Helene

October 26 34	Tampa Bay Rowdies	3–0	Indy Eleven	Bradenton, FL
7:30 PM	Arteaga pen' (9); Chrisostomo 25'; Hilton (yellow card) 50'; Jennings 63'; Munjoma (yellow card) 73'; Worth (yellow card) 90+2'	Report	Chapman-Page (yellow card) 52'	Stadium: IMG Academy Soccer Stadium; Attendance: 496; Referee: Calin Radosav

===== Playoffs =====
November 2, 2024 Conference Quarterfinal	Detroit City FC	1–1 (a.e.t.) (1–3 p)	Tampa Bay Rowdies	Hamtramck, Michigan
7:00 PM EDT	Rodriguez (yellow card) 19'; Moon 49' (o.g.); Kissiedou (yellow card) 52'; Amoo-Mensah (yellow card) 56'; Bryant (yellow card) 91'; Murphy (yellow card) 118'; Carroll (yellow card) 118'	Report	Jennings 19'; Bodily (yellow card) 41'; Niyongabire (yellow card) 78'; Doherty (yellow card) 116'	Stadium: Keyworth Stadium; Attendance: 7,183; Referee: Sergii Demianchuk
	Penalties
	Rodriguez (penalty missed); Murphy (penalty missed); Morris (penalty scored); Amoh (penalty missed)		(penalty missed) Arteaga; (penalty missed) Pérez; (penalty scored) Munjoma; (penalty scored) Murphy; (penalty scored) Doherty

November 10, 2024 Conference Semifinal	Charleston Battery	2–1	{{{team2}}}	Mount Pleasant, South Carolina
1:00 PM EST	Torres (yellow card) 9'; Smith (yellow card) 29'; Segbers (yellow card) 45+4'; Chapman (yellow card) 48'; Markanich 50'; Molloy 83'; Guillén (yellow card) 38'; Jennings (yellow card) 45+6'	Report		Stadium: Patriots Point Soccer Complex; Attendance: 5,079; Referee: Matt Thompson

=== U.S. Open Cup ===
As a member of the USL Championship, the Tampa Bay Rowdies entered the U.S. Open Cup in the Round of 32, matched up against fellow USL Championship club Birmingham Legion FC at home. After winning 6–4 in added extra time after blowing a 4–0 lead, the Rowdies were matched up against Major League Soccer side FC Dallas, again at home, where they would eventually end up losing 2–1.

May 8 Round of 32	Tampa Bay Rowdies (Florida)	6–4 (a.e.t.)	(Alabama) Birmingham Legion FC	St. Petersburg, Florida
19:30	Dennis (yellow card) 23'; Rivera 25'; Jennings 33', 45+6', 79'; Munjoma (yellow card) 82'; Arteaga 101', 109' (yellow card) 90'+3' (yellow-red card) 120'+3'	Report	Mensah (yellow card) 42'; Paterson (yellow card) 50'; Martínez 82'; Hernandez-Foster 89'; Pasher 90+3', 90+6' (pen.); Crognale (yellow card) 91'; Rufe (yellow card) 120'	Stadium: Al Lang Stadium; Attendance: 2,195; Referee: Alyssa Nichols

May 22 Round of 16	Tampa Bay Rowdies (Florida)	1–2	(Texas) FC Dallas	St. Petersburg, Florida
19:30	Pérez (yellow card) 76' (goal) 85' (pen.)	Report	Ibeagha (yellow card) 3'; Delgado 15' (yellow card) 20'; Farrington 26'; Ntsabeleng (yellow card) 52'; Farfan (yellow card) 90'+1'	Stadium: Al Lang Stadium; Attendance: 1,862; Referee: Guido Gonzalez
