= 2023 Tampa Bay Rowdies season =

Tampa Bay Rowdies
2023 season
- Chairman: Stuart Sternberg
- Head coach: Neill Collins (until June 8); Stuart Dobson (interim, until July 27); Nicky Law (from July 27)
- Stadium: Al Lang Stadium
- USL Cup: Quarterfinals
- U.S. Open Cup: Third round
- Top goalscorer: League: Cal Jennings (17); All: Cal Jennings (17)
- Highest home attendance: League: 7,407 (October 7 vs. Pittsburgh)
- Lowest home attendance: League: 3,594 (April 12 vs. Charleston)
- Average home league attendance: 5,772
- Biggest win: 5–1 (May 13 vs DCFC)
- Biggest defeat: 3–0 (March 25 vs CHS)
Home colors	Away colors	Third colors

The 2023 Tampa Bay Rowdies season was the club's fourteenth season of existence, their seventh in the United Soccer League, and fifth in the USL Championship. Including the previous Tampa Bay Rowdies, this is their 30th season of a franchise in the Tampa Bay metro area with the Rowdies moniker. Including the now-defunct Tampa Bay Mutiny, this is the 35th season of professional soccer in the Tampa Bay region.

== Club ==
=== Roster ===
As of August 25, 2023

Squad No.	Name	Nationality	Position(s)	Since	Date of birth (age)	Signed from	Games played (Note: Regular season only)	Goals scored
Goalkeepers
1	Connor Sparrow	(United States)	GK	2023	May 10, 1994 (age 32)	Miami FC	30	0
30	Phil Breno	(United States)	GK	2022	December 11, 1995 (age 30)	Permanent deal from Forward Madison FC	4	0
56	Raiko Arozarena	(Cuba)	GK	2021	March 27, 1997 (age 29)	Cafetaleros de Chiapas	0	0
Defenders
2	Conner Antley	(United States)	RB	2021	March 22, 1995 (age 31)	Indy Eleven	32	0
3	Forrest Lasso	(United States)	CB	2023	May 11, 1993 (age 33)	GIF Sundsvall	28	1
19	Freddy Kleemann	(United States)	CB	2023	March 19, 1999 (age 27)	Birmingham Legion FC	31	0
33	Aarón Guillén	(Mexico)	LB	2020	June 23, 1993 (age 32)	North Carolina FC	30	0
Midfielders
4	Lewis Hilton	(England)	CM	2020	October 22, 1993 (age 32)	Saint Louis FC	13	0
7	Yann Ekra	(France)	CM	2019	October 22, 1990 (age 35)	Charlotte Independence	31	0
8	Jake Areman	(United States)	RM	2022	March 9, 1996 (age 30)	Charlotte Independence	19	2
11	Leo Fernandes	(Brazil)	LM	2017	December 23, 1991 (age 34)	Philadelphia Union	2	0
14	Charlie Dennis	(England)	CM	2023	September 28, 1995 (age 30)	Oakland Roots	34	11
20	Zachary Herivaux	(Haiti)	CM	2023	February 1, 1996 (age 30)	Birmingham Legion	6	1
21	Dayonn Harris	(Canada)	LW	2021	August 29, 1997 (age 28)	Real Monarchs	28	1
22	Jordan Doherty	(Republic of Ireland)	DM	2023	August 29, 2000 (age 25)	Bohemian	33	0
23	Sebastian Dalgaard	(Denmark)	WM	2020	August 23, 1991 (age 34)	Hartford Athletic	24	0
24	Abel Caputo	(Venezuela)	DM	2023	July 11, 2000 (age 25)	Inter Miami CF II	2	0
Forwards
9	JJ Williams	(United States)	CF	2023	January 4, 1998 (age 28)	Phoenix Rising FC	31	12
16	Jake LaCava	(United States)	CF	2023	January 12, 2001 (age 25)	Loan from Inter Miami	21	3
26	Cal Jennings	(United States)	CF	2023	May 17, 1997 (age 29)	Los Angeles FC	31	19
30	Ariel Martínez	(Cuba)	RW	2023	May 9, 1986 (age 40)	Miami FC	20	2
77	Lucky Mkosana	(Zimbabwe)	CF	2019	September 30, 1987 (age 38)	Louisville City FC	11	0
98	Joshua Pérez	(El Salvador)	RW	2023	January 21, 1998 (age 28)	Montevarchi	10	1

=== Team management and staff ===
Front Office
Owner	(United States) Stuart Sternberg
Vice President	(United States) Ryan Helfrick
Vice chairman	(United States) Matthew Silverman
Vice chairman	(United States) Brian Auld
