= List of Tampa Bay Rowdies seasons =

The second incarnation of the club, the American soccer club Tampa Bay Rowdies, previously known as FC Tampa Bay, has competed in the second division of American soccer since 2010. The team currently competes in the USL Championship after stints in the North American Soccer League and temporary USSF Division 2 Professional League. The following list covers each season of the club's existence, documenting its performance in all competitive competitions.

== Key ==
Key to competitions

- USL Championship (USLC) – The second division of soccer in the United States, established in 2010 and previously known as USL and USL Pro. The Championship was the third division of American soccer from its founding until its elevation to second division status in 2017.
- North American Soccer League (NASL) – The second division of soccer in the United States from 2011 through 2017, now defunct.
- USSF Division 2 Professional League (D2 Pro) – The second division of soccer in the United States for a single season in 2010, now defunct.
- U.S. Open Cup (USOC) – The premier knockout cup competition in US soccer, first contested in 1914.
- CONCACAF Champions League (CCL) – The premier competition in North American soccer since 1962. It went by the name of Champions' Cup until 2008.

Key to colors and symbols

1st or W	Winners
2nd or RU	Runners-up
Last	Wooden Spoon
♦	League Golden Boot
	Highest average attendance

Key to league record

- Season = The year and article of the season
- Div = Level on pyramid
- League = League name
- Pld = Games played
- W = Games won
- L = Games lost
- D = Games drawn
- GF = Goals scored
- GA = Goals against
- Pts = Points
- PPG = Points per game
- Conf = Conference position
- Overall = League position

Key to cup record

- DNE = Did not enter
- DNQ = Did not qualify
- NH = Competition not held or canceled
- QR = Qualifying round
- PR = Preliminary round
- GS = Group stage
- R1 = First round
- R2 = Second round
- R3 = Third round
- R4 = Fourth round
- R5 = Fifth round
- QF = Quarterfinals
- SF = Semifinals
- RU = Runners-up
- W = Winners

== Seasons ==
Season	League											Position		Playoffs	USOC	USL Cup	Continental	Average attendance (Note: Avg. attendance only includes statistics from regular season matches.)	Top goalscorer(s) (Note: Top goalscorer(s) includes all goals scored in the regular season, playoffs, U.S. Open Cup, USL Cup and other competitive matches.)	
Season	Div	League	Pld	W	L	D	GF	GA	GD	Pts	PPG	Conf.	Overall	Playoffs	USOC	USL Cup	Continental	Average attendance	Name	Goals
2010	2	D2 Pro	30	7	12	11	41	46	–5	32	1.07	6th	10th	DNQ	R2	N/A	Ineligible	3,866	(United States) Aaron King	13
2011	2	NASL	28	11	9	8	41	36	+5	41	1.46	N/A	3rd	R1	DNE	N/A	DNQ	3,010	(United States) Mike Ambersley	11
2012	2	NASL	28	12	7	9	37	30	+7	45	1.61	N/A	2nd	W	R3	N/A	Ineligible	3,116	(United States) Mike Ambersley	11
2013	2	NASL	26	10	8	8	51	43	+8	38	1.46	N/A	2nd	DNQ	Ro16	N/A	DNQ	4,044	(Bulgaria) Georgi Hristov	15
2014	2	NASL	27	7	11	9	36	50	–14	30	1.11	N/A	7th	DNQ	R3	N/A	DNQ	4,550	(Bulgaria) Georgi Hristov	12
2015	2	NASL	30	10	11	9	33	37	−4	39	1.30	N/A	5th	DNQ	R3	N/A	DNQ	5,648	(Brazil) Maicon Santos	7
2016	2	NASL	32	9	11	12	40	41	−1	39	1.22	N/A	9th	DNQ	R4	N/A	DNQ	5,878	(Bulgaria) Georgi Hristov	11
2017	2	USL	32	14	7	11	50	35	+15	53	1.66	3rd	8th	QF	R3	N/A	DNQ	5,894	(Bulgaria) Georgi Hristov	15
2018	2	USL	34	11	15	8	44	44	0	41	1.21	12th	22nd	DNQ	R2	N/A	DNQ	5,553	(Bulgaria) Georgi Hristov	7
2019	2	USLC	34	16	8	10	61	33	+28	58	1.71	5th	7th	R1	R3	N/A	DNQ	5,497	(Uruguay) Sebastián Guenzatti	19
2020	2	USLC	16	10	3	3	25	11	+14	33	2.06	4th	7th	F	NH	N/A	DNQ	N/A	(Uruguay) Sebastián Guenzatti	10
2021	2	USLC	32	23	7	2	55	23	+32	71	2.22	1st	1st	RU	NH	N/A	DNQ	N/A	(Uruguay) Sebastián Guenzatti	21
2022	2	USLC	34	20	7	7	73	33	+40	67	1.97	3rd	4th	SF	R3	N/A	DNQ	5,148	(Brazil) Leo Fernandes	19
2023	2	USLC	34	19	9	6	60	39	+21	63	1.85	2nd	3rd	R1	R3	N/A	DNQ	5,984	(United States) Cal Jennings	19
2024	2	USLC	34	14	12	8	55	46	+9	50	1.47	6th	9th	R2	Ro16	N/A	DNQ	4,907	(Venezuela) Manuel Arteaga (United States) Cal Jennings	20
2025	2	USLC	30	9	14	7	43	50	–7	34	1.13	10th	19th	DNQ	Ro32	GS	DNQ	4,823	(Haiti) Woobens Pacius	14
2026	2	USLC	30	18	7	5	52	26	+26	61	2.03	1st	1st	R1	DNP (Note: USSF decreased number of teams to avoid conflict with 2026 FIFA World Cup)	QF	DNQ	5,131	(United States) MD Myers	13
Total			511	220	158	133	807	623	+184	795	1.56	–	–	–	–	–	–	–	(Uruguay) Sebastián Guenzatti	59
