= Laurence Wyke =

English footballer (born 1996)

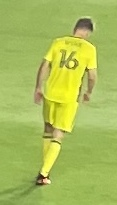
- Wyke playing for Nashville in 2023

Personal information
- Date of birth: 20 September 1996 (age 30)
- Place of birth: Bolton, England
- Positions: Defender; midfielder

Team information
- Current team: Tampa Bay Rowdies
- Number: 27

Youth career
- 2004–2013: Manchester United

College career
Years	Team	Apps	(Gls)
2015–2016	Trinity Tigers	46	(11)
2017–2018	Furman Paladins	39	(16)

Senior career*
Years	Team	Apps	(Gls)
2019	Atlanta United 2	29	(3)
2020	Atlanta United	7	(0)
2021–2022	Tampa Bay Rowdies	57	(3)
2023	Nashville SC	0	(0)
2023	→ Tampa Bay Rowdies (loan)	2	(0)
2023	→ Huntsville City FC (loan)	2	(0)
2024	Phoenix Rising	31	(0)
2025–	Tampa Bay Rowdies	44	(2)
- * Club domestic league appearances and goals as of 00:23, 26 October 2026 (UTC)

Laurence Wyke (born 20 September 1996) is an English footballer who plays as a defender for USL Championship club Tampa Bay Rowdies.

== Career ==
Wyke spent time in the Manchester United academy whilst growing before heading to America to study and play college soccer at Trinity University and Furman University. On 20 February 2019, Wyke joined USL Championship side Atlanta United 2.

Following a successful first team debut against Nashville SC in the first game of the season, Wyke was promoted to Atlanta United FC on 5 March 2020. He appeared in 7 MLS matches in the 2020 season before being released at the end of the year. In March 2021, Wyke joined Tampa Bay Rowdies ahead of the 2021 season. During his debut season with the club, Wyke was primarily utilized in the midfield, but was moved to the defensive line in 2022.

In October 2022, Wyke was fined and given a 12-game suspension following the USL Championship's investigation into allegations of racially discriminatory behavior following the October 2nd match between Monterey Bay FC and the Tampa Bay Rowdies. Following an appeal by the Rowdies, Wyke's suspension was overturned by the USL's Independent Disciplinary Council. He was released by Tampa following their 2022 season.

On 22 December 2022, it was announced that Wyke had signed with Major League Soccer side Nashville SC for the upcoming 2023 season. Wyke rejoined the Rowdies on a loan on 3 June 2023. Wyke provided one assist in two appearances for Tampa Bay before being recalled by Nashville on 17 June. He left Nashville following the 2023 season.

Wyke signed with USL Championship side Phoenix Rising on 26 January 2024.

Wyke returned to the Tampa Bay Rowdies on 14 January 2025.

== Career statistics ==
=== Club ===
As of match played 30 October 2026

Appearances and goals by club, season and competition
Club	Season	League			Cup (Note: Appearances in U.S. Open Cup)		Other		Total	
Club	Season	Division	Apps	Goals	Apps	Goals	Apps	Goals	Apps	Goals
Atlanta United 2	2019	USL Championship	29	3	—	—	—	—	29	3
Atlanta United	2020	Major League Soccer	7	0	—	—	—	—	7	0
Tampa Bay Rowdies	2021	USL Championship	27	1	—	—	4 (Note: Appearances in USL Championship playoffs)	0	31	1
Tampa Bay Rowdies	2022	USL Championship	30	2	2	1	3	0	35	3
Tampa Bay Rowdies	Total		57	3	2	1	7	0	66	4
Nashville	2023	Major League Soccer	0	0	3	0	0	0	3	0
Tampa Bay Rowdies (loan)	2023	USL Championship	2	0	—	—	—	—	2	0
Huntsville City (loan)	2023	MLS Next Pro	2	0	—	—	—	—	2	0
Phoenix Rising	2024	USL Championship	31	0	1	0	1	0	33	0
Tampa Bay Rowdies	2025	USL Championship	26	1	1	0	3 (Note: Appearance(s) in USL Cup)	0	29	0
Tampa Bay Rowdies	2026	USL Championship	18	1	0	0	4 (Note: Includes three appearances in USL Cup and one appearance in USL Championship playoffs)	0	22	1
Tampa Bay Rowdies	Total		44	2	1	0	7	0	51	2
Career total			172	8	7	1	15	0	195	9
