= Tampa Bay Rowdies =

American professional soccer club based in St. Petersburg

- Full name: Tampa Bay Rowdies
- Nickname: Rowdies
- Founded: June 18, 2008; 18 years ago
- Stadium: Al Lang Stadium; St. Petersburg, Florida
- Capacity: 7,500
- Owners: Tampa Bay Rays (Patrick Zalupski)
- Head coach: Dominic Casciato
- League: USL Championship
- 2025: 10th, Eastern Conference; Playoffs: DNQ
- Website: rowdiessoccer.com
Home colors	Away colors

The Tampa Bay Rowdies are an American professional soccer team based in St. Petersburg, Florida. The club was founded in 2008 and first took the pitch in 2010. Since 2017, the Rowdies have been members of the USL Championship in the second tier of the American soccer pyramid. They formerly played in USSF Division 2 (in 2010) and the North American Soccer League (NASL) (from 2011 to 2016), which were also second-tier leagues. The Rowdies play their home games at Al Lang Stadium on St. Petersburg's downtown waterfront.

The current club is a phoenix club of the original Tampa Bay Rowdies, who were active from 1975 until 1993, most notably in the original North American Soccer League. The original owners of the current club announced their intention to use the old Rowdies' trademarks at their introductory press conference in 2008, but licensing issues forced the new club to use the name FC Tampa Bay until December 2011, when it gained full rights to the Rowdies name and other intellectual property. The current Rowdies have always used the same green and yellow color scheme and "hoops" as the original team and revived much of its club culture even before it could legally use the "Rowdies" name and other trademarks.

The current Rowdies captured the NASL championship in Soccer Bowl 2012, and their team shield includes two stars: one for their 2012 win and one for the 1975 Soccer Bowl championship won by the original Rowdies. The club has had a long-standing rivalry with the Fort Lauderdale Strikers, with whom they have contested the Florida Derby since the original Rowdies and Strikers first met in 1977. The Rowdies were also named co-league champions in 2020 after winning the USL Regular Season title and Eastern Conference Championship, but the title game was canceled due to COVID-19. They were Eastern Conference Champions again in 2021, but lost in the title game.

In 2018, the owners of Major League Baseball's Tampa Bay Rays purchased the Rowdies and assumed control of Al Lang Stadium. When the Rays were sold to a new ownership group in 2025, the Rowdies were included as part of the sale.

== Background ==
The original Tampa Bay Rowdies were an expansion franchise in the original North American Soccer League and played for 10 seasons in Tampa Stadium starting in 1975. NASL indoor competitions saw the Rowdies claim three titles during the 1976, 1979–1980, and 1983 seasons. The Rowdies played until the NASL folded in 1984, after which the team played in the AISA, ASL and the APSL before folding in 1993. Between the years of the former and current Rowdies franchises, the Tampa Bay Mutiny played in the Major League Soccer during 1996 through 2001, leaving less than ten years between professional soccer teams in Tampa Bay since the former Rowdies' first season in 1975 and FC Tampa Bay's first season in 2010. While the Mutiny have no connection to either Rowdies franchise, the team often paid tribute to the former Rowdies by wearing jerseys of their colors, and even wearing the logo of both the Tampa Bay Mutiny and Rowdies on the same shirt.

== History ==
On June 18, 2008, local businessmen David Laxer, Andrew Nestor and Hinds Howard announced plans to start a new soccer club which would revive the Rowdies name as FC Tampa Bay Rowdies and start play in 2010 as an expansion team in the USL First Division, the second tier of the American Soccer Pyramid. However, in November 2009, FC Tampa Bay announced its intent to instead become the co-founders of a new North American Soccer League, which would begin play in 2010. These plans were subsequently superseded by the USSF Division 2 deal, which created a compromise one-season only league comprising teams from both the USL and the new NASL. In December 2013, local businessman Bill Edwards bought a controlling interest in the club. In October 2018, the Tampa Bay Rays baseball club announced their purchase the Rowdies for an undisclosed amount, pending St. Petersburg City Council approval. Once the sale was finalized, Rays presidents Matthew Silverman and Brian Auld became vice chairmen of the soccer club.

=== Name changes ===
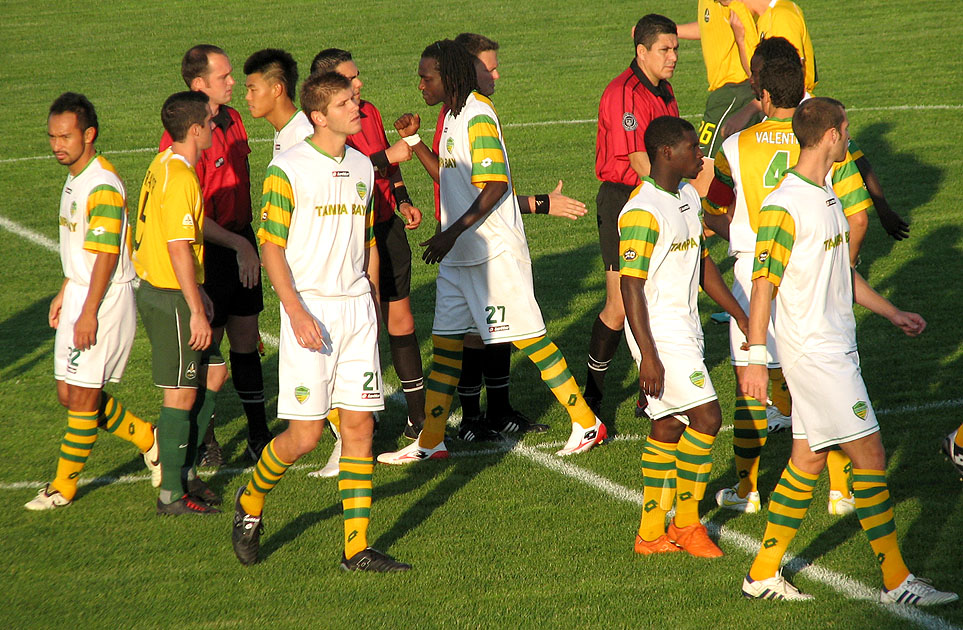
Tampa Bay taking the field in St. Louis, 2010

In January 2010, the club became known as "FC Tampa Bay" due to a legal dispute with sports apparel company Classic Ink over the merchandising rights to the Tampa Bay Rowdies name and related trademarks. The name was still used informally by the club until October 2010, when the team announced that it would not use the "Rowdies" nickname at all until the ongoing rights issue was resolved.

On December 15, 2011, after two seasons of play, the club announced that it had finally reached a licensing agreement to use the "Rowdies" name and classic logos, allowing it to change its name back to "Tampa Bay Rowdies" before the 2012 season.

=== 2010 season ===
The team played its first official game on April 16, 2010, a 1–0 victory over Crystal Palace Baltimore. The first goal in franchise history was scored by striker Aaron King. The first home game was held at George M. Steinbrenner Field in Tampa on May 8, 2010, and ended in a 2–2 draw with Austin Aztex FC. The club started their inaugural season with a 5–1–3 record, but then won only 2 of its last 21 games and failed to make the playoffs with a final record of 7–12–11, leading to dismissal of manager Paul Dalglish. They did, however, capture the 2010 Ponce De Leon Cup.

=== 2011 season ===
For the 2011 season, FC Tampa Bay transitioned to the new North American Soccer League, a second division league, and also changed their home pitch, as they moved across Tampa Bay to Al Lang Stadium in St. Petersburg. Former original Rowdie Ricky Hill was named the club's manager in January 2011.

After winning only 2 of their first 10 matches, the club rebounded to finish third in the league table and qualified for the NASL playoffs. A highlight was a 1–0 mid-season friendly win over the Bolton Wanderers of the English Premier League at Al Lang Stadium.

=== 2012 season ===
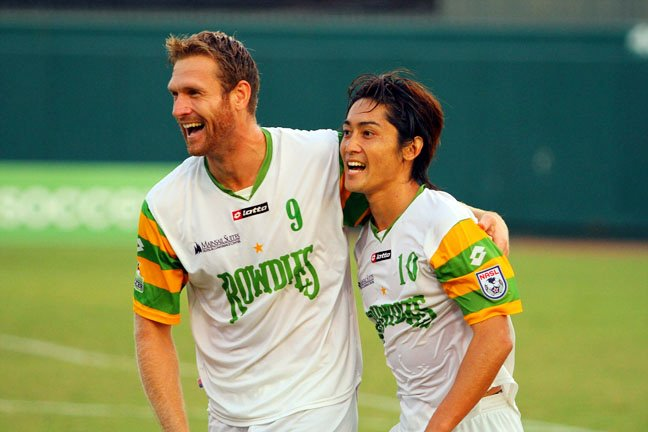
Dan Antoniuk and Tsuyoshi Yoshitake, 2012

The 2012 season marked the return of the Rowdies name, as the club was finally able to secure full rights to use the moniker. It was also the most successful season in modern Rowdies history, as the club finished second in the league table and became NASL champions with a victory in Soccer Bowl 2012.

Tampa Bay amassed 45 points in 28 matches during the regular season under returning manager Ricky Hill, tallying 12 wins, nine draws, and seven losses. The Rowdies earned a bye to the semifinals of the 2012 NASL Playoffs, where they beat the Carolina RailHawks by a 5–4 aggregate in the two-leg series. In the championship round against Minnesota Stars FC, the Rowdies fell behind 0–2 after the first leg but were able to tie the aggregate with a 3–1 win in the second leg back at Al Lang Stadium. Extra time ended scoreless, so the match was decided with a penalty shoot-out, which Tampa Bay won 3–2 to secure the league championship. Hill was named the NASL Coach of the Year.

=== 2013 season ===
The defending champions got off to a slow start in two pre-league tournaments, as they went winless in their first six contests against MLS and USL Pro clubs. The Rowdies improved enough in league play to finish 4th in the NASL spring table with a record of 5 wins, 3 draws, and 4 losses. The highlight of the early season was a run to the 4th round of the 2013 Lamar Hunt U.S. Open Cup, which included a 1–0 win over Seattle Sounders FC of MLS.

The Rowdies went 5–4–4 during the fall portion of the schedule, good for 3rd place. The club earned 38 points over the entire campaign, second most in the league. However, because of the NASL's new split-season format, the Rowdies did not qualify for the playoffs. Midfielder/striker Georgi Hristov led the team with 15 goals in all competitions and was named the NASL's Golden Ball Award winner (MVP).

=== 2014 season ===
The Rowdies struggled in 2014, coming in 7th place in the NASL's spring season and 8th in the fall while allowing the most goals (50) in the league overall. The club rose to 3rd in the table midway through the fall campaign but tailed off, going winless over their last 10 matches. Manager Ricky Hill was dismissed after the season.

=== 2015 season ===
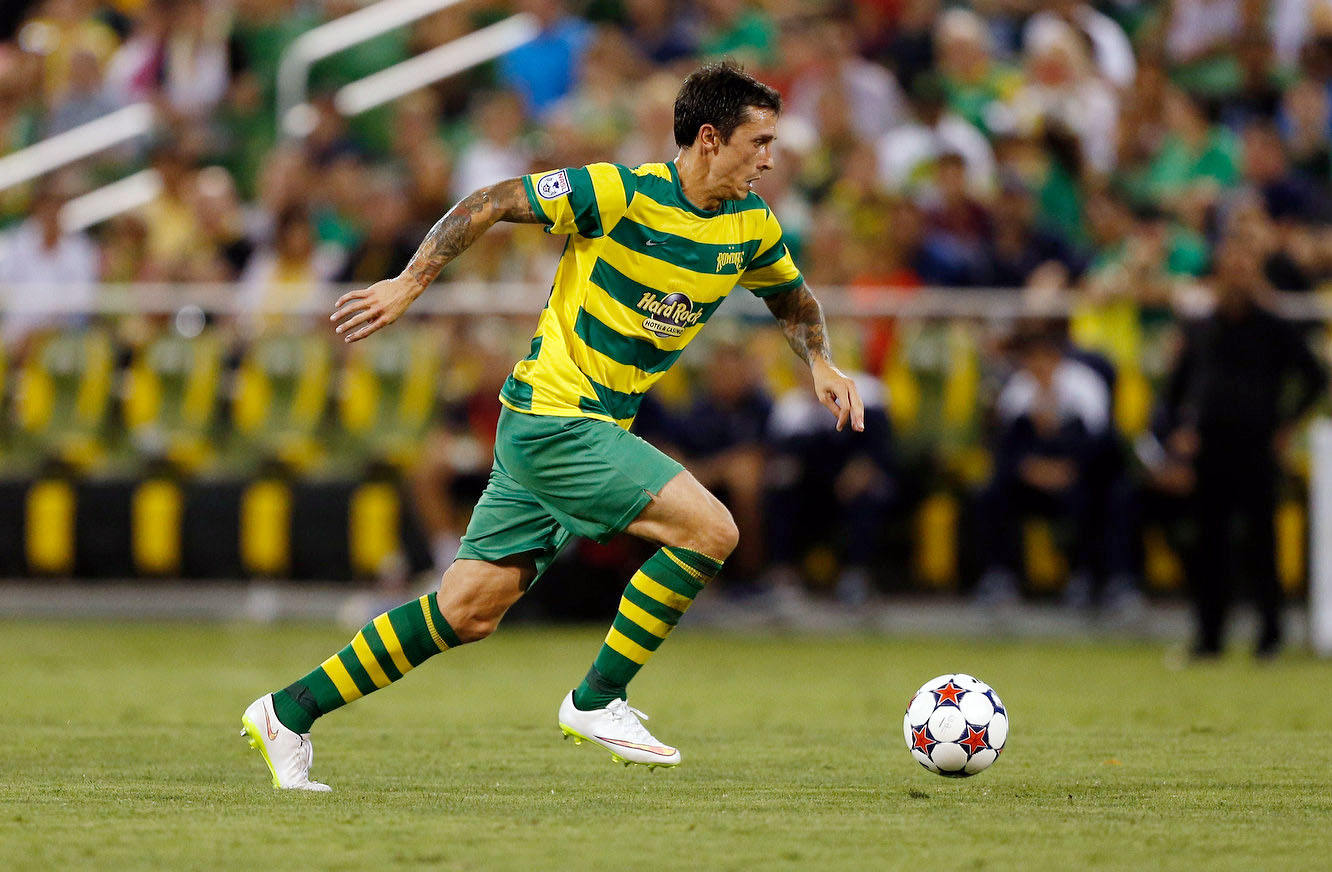
Georgi Hristov playing for the Tampa Bay Rowdies against Jacksonville Armada FC on April 25, 2015.

The Tampa Bay Rowdies' new manager for 2015 was Thomas Rongen, who had coached the MLS's Tampa Bay Mutiny in 1996. The team also brought in another familiar face when Farrukh Quraishi, who had been a player and a youth development director for the original Rowdies, was named general manager.

In March 2015, the Rowdies traveled to Portugal to play several preseason friendlies against clubs in the Portuguese second and third divisions. It was the first time that the current club had undertaken an international tour.

The Rowdies lost only one match during the NASL spring season, good for second place in the table. After starting the fall season 2–1–6, however, club owner Bill Edwards dismissed both Rongen and Quraishi. Assistant Stuart Campbell was promoted to manager and led the team to a 3–4–4 record. The Rowdies finished the fall season in 8th out of 11 teams in the league table and missed the playoffs.

=== 2016 season ===
For the second consecutive year, the Rowdies visited Europe during the preseason, traveling to England in March to play several friendlies. The Rowdies held their own against three lower division sides, going 1–2–0 in official matches. The results of the 2016 NASL season were not as good. The club went 4–4–2 in the NASL spring season, good for 5th out of eleven teams in the league table. However, results slipped in the fall portion of the schedule, and the Rowdies finished the season 9–11–12, missing the playoffs for the fourth consecutive year. A few days before their final game of the season, the franchise announced they would be leaving the NASL to compete in the United Soccer League beginning with the 2017 season.

=== 2017 season ===
Having made the jump to the USL, the Rowdies served notice that they were not to be taken lightly. During the regular season, they lost only once at home, and en route to finishing in third position on the USL's Eastern Conference table, they lost only two of their final 15 matches. They posted a record of 14–11–7 with 53 points to propel them into the playoffs. In the USL Cup playoffs, they lost in extra time at home in the conference semifinals. It was only their second home loss of the season.

=== 2018 season ===
After a strong start, the team lost three straight without scoring a goal. This prompted the firing of head coach Stuart Campbell on May 17, with defender Neill Collins retiring to accept the coaching vacancy the following day. On July 4 Georgi Hristov scored his 58th career goal for the Rowdies, to pass Derek Smethurst and become the Rowdies' all-time top scorer. The team finished the season in 12th position on the Eastern Conference table.

=== 2019 season ===
An extremely strong start saw the club go unbeaten in their first 13 matches and lose only once in their first 20. The final third of the season wasn't as successful, as the team lost half of their last 14 games, including 2 crucial losses to expansion sides in October that saw the club finish 5th in the Eastern Conference. Their return to the postseason was short-lived, as they lost 2–1 on the road in Louisville in the first round of the 2019 USL Championship Playoffs. Elsewhere, the club advanced to the third round of the 2019 U.S. Open Cup, defeating The Villages SC before falling to OKC Energy FC. The club also entered into a partnership with Norwich City FC that saw defender Caleb Richards arrive on a season-long loan. Richards made 34 appearances, playing all but two minutes of the regular season, and scoring one goal.

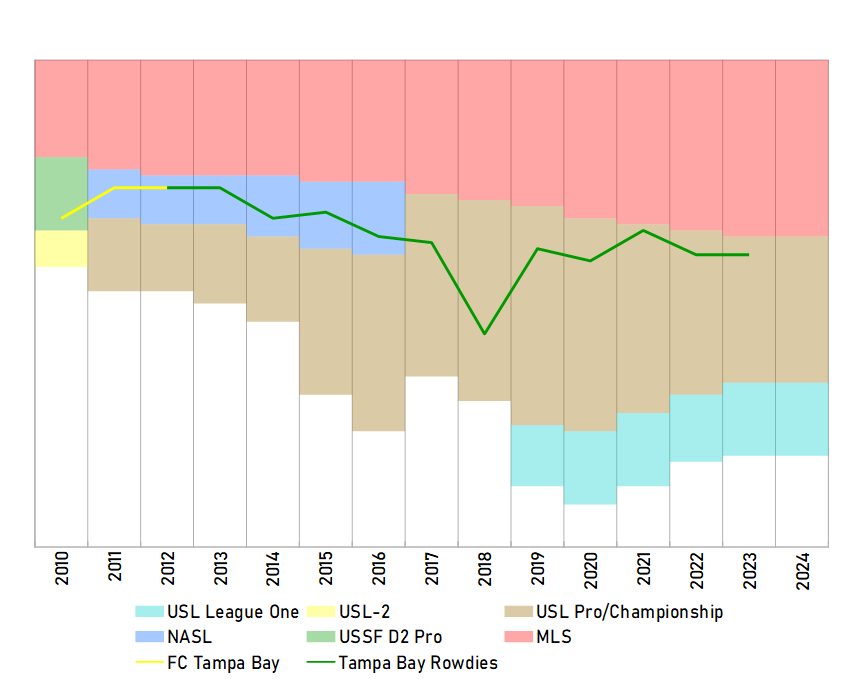
Historical chart of the Rowdies' regular season performance in the modern era

== Club venues ==
=== Al Lang Stadium ===
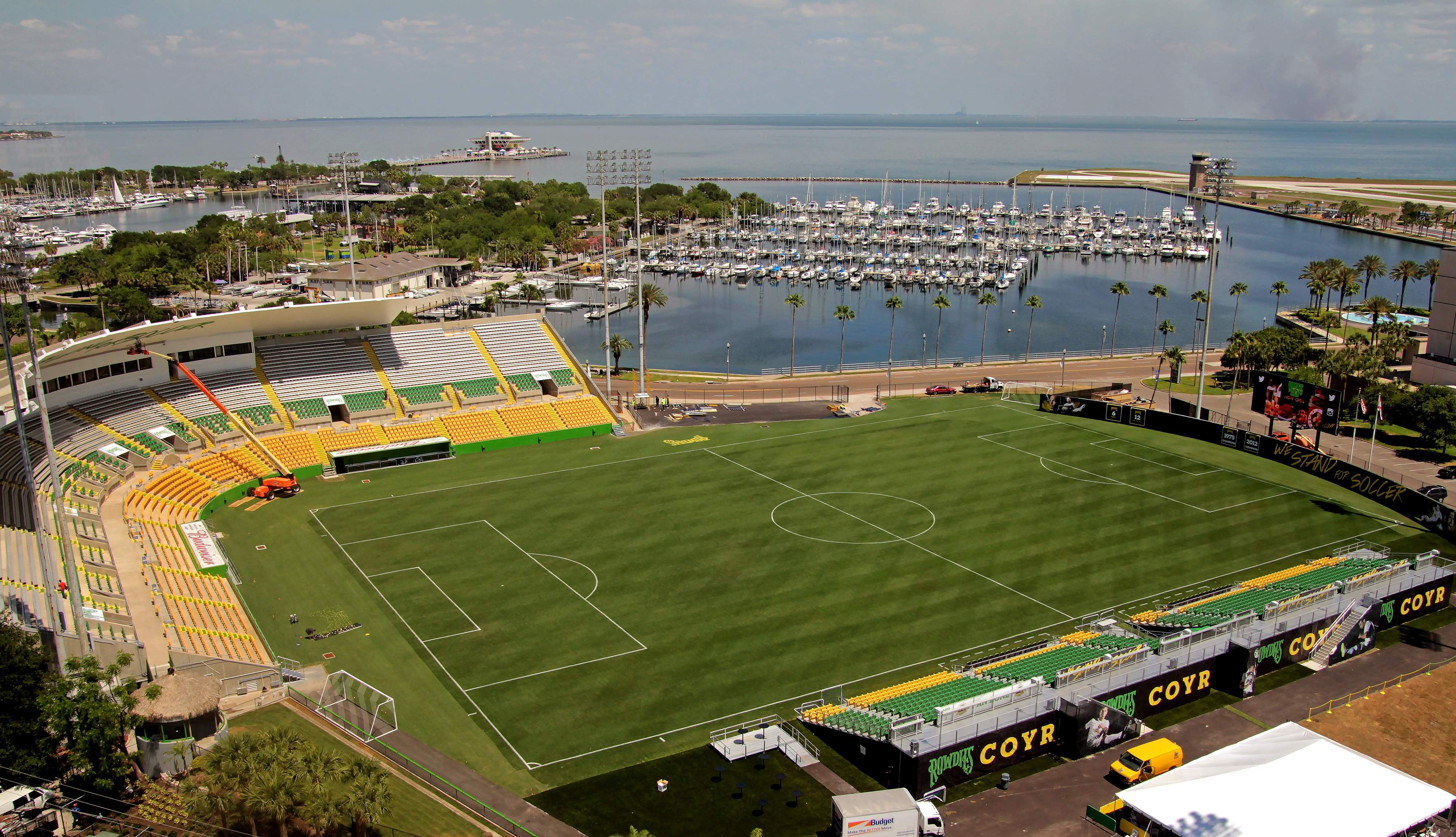
Al Lang Stadium showing soccer arrangement since 2015

The Rowdies' home pitch since 2011 has been Al Lang Stadium, a 7,500 seat former baseball stadium located on the downtown waterfront of St. Petersburg, Florida. When the club first moved to the venue, the pitch ran from the third base grandstand to right field wall, and the seating arrangement utilized the baseball grandstand along with temporary bleachers along one sideline. The arrangement has been tweaked every season since to provide a more traditional soccer experience for the fans.

The facility underwent a significant renovation in 2015 that reconfigured the pitch to run from the grandstand on one end to the left field wall on the other. A portion of the old right field wall was removed, and larger semi-permanent bleachers were installed along the south sideline, adding many more seats closer to the action and making Al Lang Stadium more soccer-friendly.

The team played its final two regular season 2024 matches at IMG Academy in Bradenton, Florida due to extensive damage to Al Lang from Hurricane Helene and Milton.

==== Stadium management ====
Although the Rowdies have been the only regular tenant of Al Lang Stadium since 2011, it was still used for exhibition and amateur baseball events during the spring and summer, necessitating the regular restoration and removal of the pitcher's mound and clay infield and causing much wear and tear to the turf.

After becoming majority owner of the club in 2013, St. Petersburg businessman Bill Edwards expressed displeasure with the condition of the playing field and the aging facilities at Al Lang Stadium. Months of rebuffed complaints about poor turf, leaky pipes, broken seats, and other issues culminated in a July 2014 lawsuit filed by the Rowdies against the St. Petersburg Baseball Commission claiming that the commission was not properly maintaining the "dilapidated" facility. The dispute was resolved in October 2014 when Edwards and the city of St. Petersburg brokered a deal that gave Edwards' Big 3 Entertainment company sole management control of Al Lang Stadium. As part of the arrangement, the facility would no longer be used for spring baseball, and Edwards agreed to complete $1.5 million in renovations as he sought to make Al Lang more soccer friendly.

=== Former stadiums ===
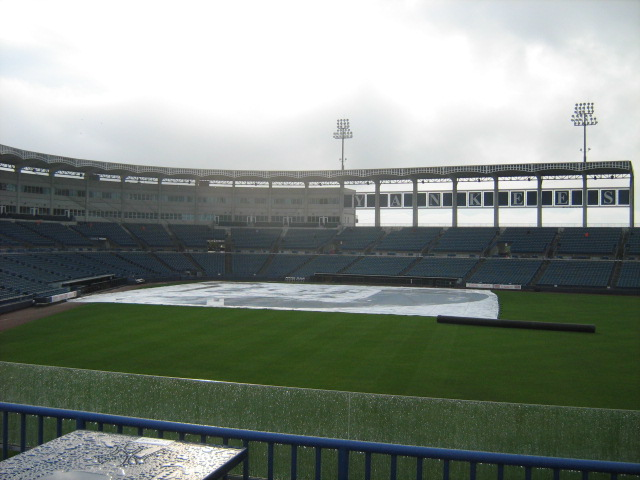
George M. Steinbrenner Field

When the club was founded in 2008, its owners announced plans to build a 5000-seat soccer-specific stadium in northwest Tampa along the Veterans Expressway. These plans were shelved in early 2009 when residents living near the chosen site voiced concerns to the Hillsborough County Commission about potential noise and parking issues.

After exploring other possible stadium sites around the Tampa Bay area, FC Tampa Bay decided to play its 2010 inaugural season at George M. Steinbrenner Field, an 11,000-seat baseball stadium near West Tampa. The club shared the facility with the Tampa Yankees, the Class A-Advanced affiliate of the New York Yankees, which presented some difficulties. Scheduling home games was a challenge because the club's seasons overlapped for most of the summer. The pitcher's mound and the infield dirt could not be removed, forcing the soccer field to be set across the outfield from the right field foul line to left centerfield. This created a pitch much smaller than most professional soccer fields, and a large portion of the playing surface of one attacking third was clay. And because of the difficulty of running on wet clay and potential damage to soggy turf, the Rowdies were not allowed to take the field when the ground was wet, which is often the case during Tampa's summer rainy season.

Because of all these problems, the soccer club relocated to Al Lang Field for their second campaign.

=== Future plans ===
In 2013, the city of St. Petersburg began the process of creating a master plan for the waterfront area that includes Al Lang Stadium. Some of the proposals suggest replacing the entire stadium and surrounding parking areas with a soccer park complex centered by a new soccer-specific stadium. Former club owner, Bill Edwards, had stated that "in a perfect world", Al Lang Stadium would be replaced by an 18,000-seat soccer-specific stadium, enabling the Rowdies to become a Major League Soccer club.

== Colours and badge ==
=== Badge ===
When the club first took the pitch in 2010, the badge was a green and yellow striped shield bearing the club name (FC Tampa Bay) and topped with a star representing the original Rowdies' victory in Soccer Bowl 1975. The badge was changed before the 2012 season to the original "Rowdies" text logo, and a second star was added after the club won Soccer Bowl 2012.

In 2021, the club introduced an alternate crest, which still contained the text logo and stars, but with the addition of a figure styled after Ralph Rowdie, the mascot of the original club. It also had the numbers "75" and "10" to represent the founding year of the original club in 1975 and the current club in 2010.

=== Kit history ===
Home, away, and third kits.

- Home

2010	2011	2012	2013	2014	2015–17	2018–20	2021	2022–23

2024	2025	2026–

- Away

2010	2011	2012	2013	2014	2015	2016	2017	2018

2019	2020	2021	2022–24	2025	2026–

- Third

2013	2014	2015	2016	2017	2018	2019	2020	2021

2022–23	2024

== Club culture ==
=== Supporters ===
Ralph's Mob is an independent supporter group for the Rowdies named after "Ralph Rowdie", a fictional mustached footballer featured in the logo of the original Tampa Bay Rowdies. The group is known for wearing green and gold striped scarves, socks, and face paint, and for loudly cheering on their team while teasing opponents, much like the "Fannies" of the original Rowdies. Ralph's Mob has a designated seating area at home matches. Many members also travel to away games, particularly when the Rowdies play at in-state rival Fort Lauderdale. A second group, the Skyway Casuals, is composed of supporters from the area south of the Skyway Bridge, mainly Bradenton and Sarasota.

=== Rivalries ===
The Rowdies' traditional rivalry has been with the Fort Lauderdale Strikers. The rivalry began in 1977 between the original Tampa Bay Rowdies and the original Fort Lauderdale Strikers of the old NASL when the term Florida Derby was first used. It came back into use again in the late 1990s, when both cities had MLS franchises (the Tampa Bay Mutiny & Miami Fusion). Finally in 2010, after a nine-year absence Florida Derby re-entered the lexicon of American soccer, as the modern squads began facing one another. The rivalry currently sits in limbo, after Rowdies' owner, Bill Edwards won a 2017 summary judgement in a lawsuit against the Strikers. Edwards now controls the copyrights, trademarks and any rights to the use of the name "Fort Lauderdale Strikers" or any variation thereof.

=== Coastal Cup ===
The Coastal Cup (est. 2010) originally was contested between the Rowdies and Strikers, but with Jacksonville Armada FC's entry into the league in 2015 and Miami FC in 2016, the competition had grown to become quadrilateral.

=== Rowdies 2 ===
In December 2015 the Rowdies announced that they would begin fielding a developmental team in the National Premier Soccer League for the 2016 season and that the club would be called Rowdies 2. The original Tampa Bay Rowdies had fielded a similarly named reserve/developmental squad from 1982 to 1983, but used Roman numerals to dub them Rowdies II. Rowdies 2 competed in the Sunshine Conference of the South Region of NPSL, finishing in fourth place with a record of four wins, four losses, and two draws. The team disbanded in 2016.

Year	League	Regular season	Playoffs	U.S. Open Cup
2016	NPSL	4th, Sunshine Conference	did not qualify	Ineligible

=== Rowdies U23 ===
In February 2017, The Rowdies announced that they would field a team in the USL's Premier Development League, with Rowdies U23 set to join the league this for 2017 PDL season. Rowdies U23 will compete in the Southeast Division of the Southern Conference of PDL. The team went 3–8–3 in conference play and finished sixth out of nine teams. The team did not return for the 2018 season.

On January 15, 2020, USL League Two (formerly the PDL) announced that the Rowdies would be launching the U23 for the 2020 USL League Two season. The team will play in the Southeast Division once again, play its games as Al Lang Stadium, and will be coached by former Rowdies player Andres Arango.

Year	League	Regular season	Playoffs	U.S. Open Cup
2017	PDL	6th, Southeast Division	did not qualify	Ineligible
2018	No team fielded			
2019	No team fielded			
2020	USL2	TBD, Southeast Division	TBD	Ineligible

=== Tampa Bay United ===
In 2017, they formed a partnership with youth club Tampa Bay United to serve as their youth affiliate. In 2021, TBU replaced the Rowdies U23 in USL League Two.

== Players and staff ==
=== Roster ===
As of September 14, 2026

Note: Flags indicate national team as defined under FIFA eligibility rules; some limited exceptions apply. Players may hold more than one non-FIFA nationality.

No.	Pos.	Nation	Player
1	GK	JAM	Jahmali Waite
3	DF	USA	Brian Schaefer (on loan from FC Cincinnati)
4	MF	ENG	Lewis Hilton
5	DF	FRA	Yanis Leerman
7	FW	USA	Evan Conway
8	MF	BRA	Pedro Dolabella
9	FW	USA	MD Myers
10	FW	USA	Russell Cicerone
11	FW	CRC	Gino Vivi (on loan from LA Galaxy)
13	MF	FRA	Louis Perez
14	FW	USA	Karsen Henderlong
16	MF	ITA	Marco Micaletto
19	FW	CUW	Jürgen Locadia
20	DF	USA	Charlie Ostrem

No.	Pos.	Nation	Player
21	DF	USA	Ethan Bartlow (on loan from Sporting Kansas City)
22	DF	USA	Gennaro Nigro
23	MF	GER	Max Schneider
24	GK	USA	Austin Pack
26	DF	USA	Dion Acoff
27	DF	ENG	Laurence Wyke
28	GK	USA	Owen Finnerty
30	MF	USA	Sebastian Cruz
35	GK	USA	Caleb Klepacz
36	FW	USA	Alexander Rodriguez
37	DF	USA	Jesse Tita
41	DF	USA	Joshua Kachurak
55	DF	TTO	Leland Archer
62	DF	CAN	Nathan Dossantos

Amateur agreement

=== Out on loan ===
Note: Flags indicate national team as defined under FIFA eligibility rules; some limited exceptions apply. Players may hold more than one non-FIFA nationality.

No.	Pos.	Nation	Player
47	MF	HON	Luis Álvarez (loaned to Charlotte Independence)

=== Technical staff ===
- (England) Dominic Casciato – head coach
- (France) Yann Ekra – assistant coach
- (United States) John Pascarella – assistant coach
- (South Sudan) - Ladule Lako LoSarah – assistant coach
- (England) - Andrew Fox – assistant coach
- (England) Stuart Dobson – goalkeeping coach

=== Medical staff ===
- (United States) Dave Walker – head athletic trainer
- (United States) Andrew Keane – assistant athletic trainer
- (United States) Dr. Justin Thompson – team physician
- (United States) Dr. Katherine Wojnowich – team physician
- (United States) Dr. George Canizares – team physician
- (United States) Dr. Eric Gorman – team chiropractor
- (United States) Dr. James Felch – team dentist
- (United States) Cynthia Torres - Certified Athletic Trainer

=== Front office ===
- (United States) Brian Auld – co-chairman
- (United States) Ken Babby – co-chairman
- (United States) Ryan Helfrick – President
- (Argentina) Nico Castillo - head soccer operations

=== Head coaches ===
As of 2025 season

Head Coach	Years	*Matches	*Win-Draw-Loss
(Scotland) Paul Dalglish	2009–2010	30	7–11–12
(United States) Perry Van der Beck	2010	2	1–0–1
(England) Ricky Hill	2011–2014	120	45–35–40
(Netherlands) Thomas Rongen	2014–2015	19	7–5–7
(Scotland) Stuart Campbell	2015–2018	92	33–27–32
(Scotland) Neill Collins	2018–2023	176	97-34-45
(England) Stuart Dobson	2023	5	0-2-3
(England) Nicky Law	2023	15	9-1-5
(Scotland) Robbie Neilson	2024–2025	40	18-11-11
(United States) Steve Coleman	2025	32	11–9–13

Notes

*Includes U.S. Open Cup, USL Cup, and playoff matches.

=== Retired numbers* ===
No.	Player	Position	Nation	Tenure
6	Mike Connell	Defender	South Africa	1975–1984
12	Perry Van der Beck	Midfielder	United States	1978–1982, 1984, 1991–1993

*Steve Wegerle's No. 7 jersey was retired by the original Tampa Bay Rowdies in 1989. As of yet the current club does not acknowledge this honor.

=== Team captains ===
Player	Seasons	ref
(United States) Julian Valentin	2010	
(United States) Frank Sanfilippo	2011–2014	
(Brazil) Marcelo Saragosa	2015	
(England) Tamika Mkandawire	2016	
(England) Joe Cole	2017–2018	
(Uruguay) Sebastián Guenzatti	2019–2022	
(Mexico) Aarón Guillén	2023–present	

== Record ==
Season	League											Position		Playoffs	USOC	USL Cup	Continental	Average attendance (Note: Avg. attendance only includes statistics from regular season matches.)	Top goalscorer(s) (Note: Top goalscorer(s) includes all goals scored in the regular season, playoffs, U.S. Open Cup, USL Cup and other competitive matches.)	
Season	Div	League	Pld	W	L	D	GF	GA	GD	Pts	PPG	Conf.	Overall	Playoffs	USOC	USL Cup	Continental	Average attendance	Name	Goals
2021	2	USLC	32	23	7	2	55	23	+32	71	2.22	1st	1st	RU	NH	N/A	DNQ	N/A	(Uruguay) Sebastián Guenzatti	21
2022	2	USLC	34	20	7	7	73	33	+40	67	1.97	3rd	4th	SF	R3	N/A	DNQ	5,148	(Brazil) Leo Fernandes	19
2023	2	USLC	34	19	9	6	60	39	+21	63	1.85	2nd	3rd	R1	R3	N/A	DNQ	5,984	(United States) Cal Jennings	19
2024	2	USLC	34	14	12	8	55	46	+9	50	1.47	6th	9th	R2	Ro16	N/A	DNQ	4,907	(Venezuela) Manuel Arteaga (United States) Cal Jennings	20
2025	2	USLC	30	9	14	7	43	50	–7	34	1.13	10th	19th	DNQ	Ro32	GS	DNQ	4,823	(Haiti) Woobens Pacius	14
2026	2	USLC	30	18	7	5	52	26	+26	61	2.03	1st	1st	R1	DNP (Note: USSF decreased number of teams to avoid conflict with 2026 FIFA World Cup)	QF	DNQ	5,131	(United States) MD Myers	13
Total			511	220	158	133	807	623	+184	795	1.56	–	–	–	–	–	–	–	(Uruguay) Sebastián Guenzatti	59

=== Notable friendlies ===
July 14, 2011	FC Tampa Bay	1–0	Bolton Wanderers	St. Petersburg, Florida
7:30 pm	Clare 65' (yellow card) 85'	Report		Stadium: Al Lang Stadium; Attendance: 3,914

February 13, 2016	Tampa Bay Rowdies	0–1	D.C. United	St. Petersburg, Florida
7:00 pm	King (yellow card) 32'; Burgos (yellow card) 41'	Report	Espindola 27'; Clowes (yellow card) 30'; Birnbaum (yellow card) 43'	Stadium: Al Lang Stadium

February 20, 2016	Tampa Bay Rowdies	0–2	Philadelphia Union	St. Petersburg, Florida
7:00 pm	Sweat (yellow card) 1'	Report	Tribbett 17'; Fernandes 29'; Anderson (yellow card) 58'; Restrepo (yellow card) 79'	Stadium: Al Lang Stadium

February 27, 2016	Tampa Bay Rowdies	0–0	Montreal Impact	St. Petersburg, Florida
7:00 pm		Report		Stadium: Al Lang Stadium

== Honors ==
North American Soccer League
Winners: 2012
USL Championship
Runners-up: 2021
Finalists: 2020 (Note: Championship game canceled due to COVID-19 outbreak in the Rowdies camp.)

USL Championship Player's Shield Winners
2021, 2026
USL Championship - Eastern Conference Champion
2020, 2021
Ponce De Leon Cup
Winners: 2010, 2012
Coastal Cup
Winners: 2010, 2011, 2012, 2013, 2016, 2020, 2021, 2022, 2023, 2024, 2025
NASL Fair Play Award
Winners: 2011, 2012, 2014

=== Individual achievements ===
Golden Ball Award (MVP)
2013: Georgi Hristov

Golden Glove Award
2021: Evan Louro

Coach of the Year
2012: Ricky Hill
2021: Neill Collins

Goalkeeper of the Year
2021: Evan Louro

Defender of the Year
2020: Forrest Lasso
2021: Forrest Lasso

NASL Best XI
2011: Pascal Millien, Mike Ambersley
2012: Jeff Attinella, Takuya Yamada, Luke Mulholland
2013: Luke Mulholland, Georgi Hristov
2016: Joe Cole

USL Championship MVP
2022: Leo Fernandes

USL Championship All-League
2017: (1st team) Marcel Schäfer
2019: (2nd team) Papé Diakité, Sebastián Guenzatti
2020: (1st team) Forrest Lasso
2021: (1st team) Evan Louro, Forrest Lasso, Sebastián Guenzatti
2021: (2nd team) Aarón Guillén
2022: (1st team) Leo Fernandes, Aarón Guillén
2023: (1st team) Cal Jennings, Charlie Dennis

== See also ==
- Tampa Bay Mutiny
- Tampa Bay Rowdies (1975–1993)
- Tampa Bay Rowdies U23
- Tampa Bay Buccaneers
- Tampa Bay Lightning
- Tampa Bay Rays
