= Davi Alexandre =

American soccer player

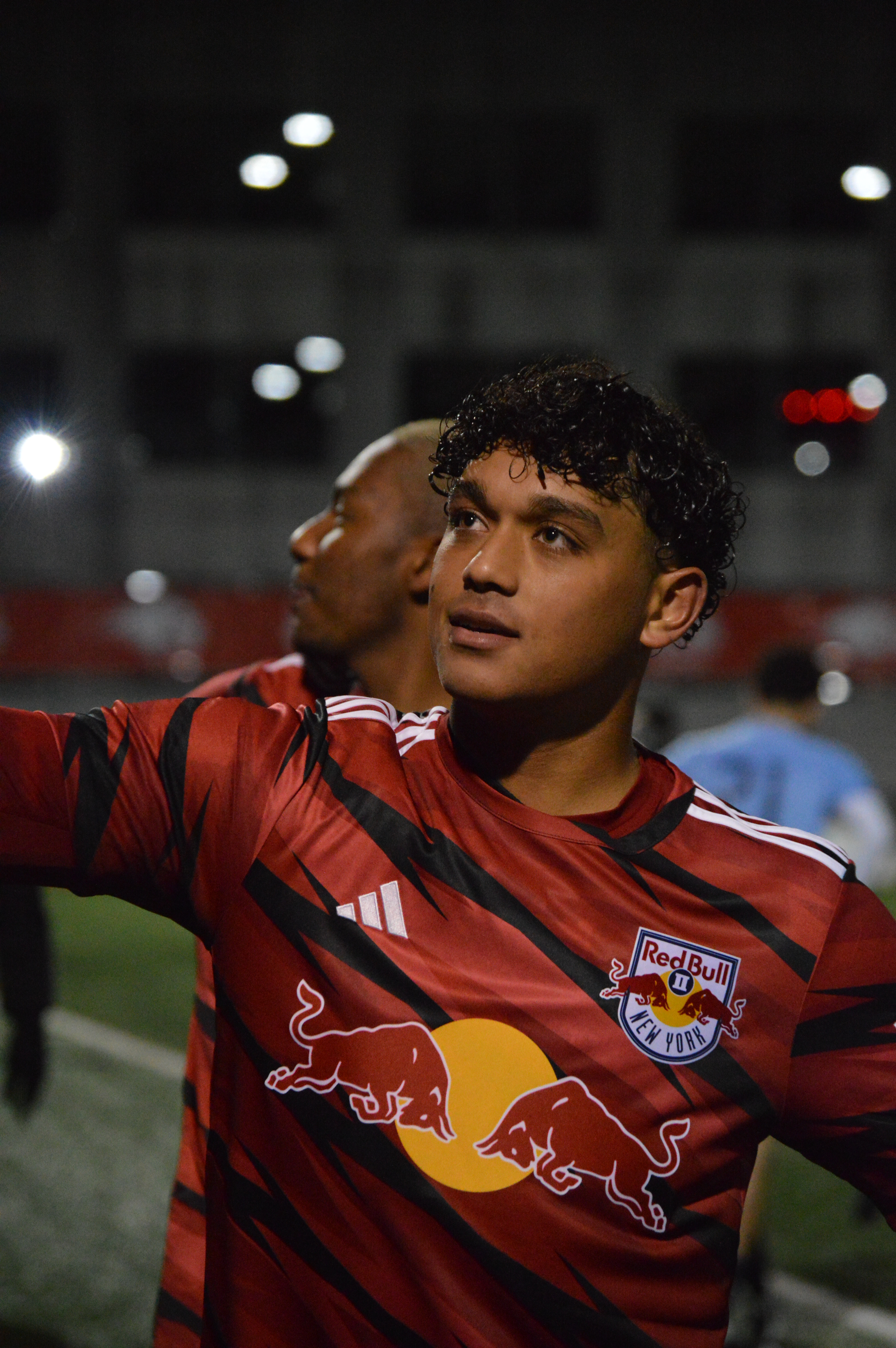

Personal information
- Date of birth: February 3, 2007 (age 19)
- Place of birth: Queens, New York, United States
- Height: 1.85 m (6 ft 1 in)
- Position: Defender

Team information
- Current team: Benidorm
- Number: 27

Youth career
- New York City FC
- 2021-2022: New York Red Bulls

Senior career*
Years	Team	Apps	(Gls)
2022–2025	New York Red Bulls II	32	(2)
2024–2025	New York Red Bulls	0	(0)
2025–	Benidorm	0	(0)

International career
2023	United States U15	4	(0)
2023	United States U16	2	(0)
- * Club domestic league appearances and goals as of September 18, 2025

Davi Alexandre (born February 3, 2007) is an American soccer player who plays as a defender for Benidorm in the Lliga Comunitat.

== Club career ==
=== Early career ===
Born in Queens, New York, Alexandre began his youth career with local club New York City FC. In 2021, he joined the New York Red Bulls Academy and featured within Red Bulls Academy from the U-14 level up to U-17 level.

=== New York Red Bulls II ===
On 3 August 2022, Alexandre made his professional debut with New York Red Bulls II, appearing as a starter in a 1–2 loss against Memphis 901.

On 19 April 2023, Alexandre signed an MLS NEXT Pro contract for the 2023 season, joining the first team on an MLS contract for 2024 through the 2026 MLS season. On 25 June 2023, Alexandre scored the first goal of his professional career in a 3–1 victory over FC Cincinnati 2.

On 20 March 2024, Alexandre made his U.S. Open Cup debut, appearing as a starter for New York Red Bulls II in a 5–1 victory over Hudson Valley Hammers in the first round of the U.S. Open Cup.

On September 5, 2025, Alexandre and Red Bulls mutually agreed to terminate his contract at the club.

== International ==
Alexandre is eligible to represent both the United States and Brazil national teams. Alexandre has featured for the United States Youth National Team at the U-15 and U-16 level.

== Career statistics ==
As of match played May 18, 2025

Appearances and goals by club, season and competition
Club	Season	League			U.S. Open Cup		League cup		Continental		Total	
Club	Season	Division	Apps	Goals	Apps	Goals	Apps	Goals	Apps	Goals	Apps	Goals
New York Red Bulls II	2022	USL Championship	6	0	0	0	0	0	0	0	6	0
New York Red Bulls II	2023	MLS Next Pro	14	1	0	0	0	0	0	0	14	1
New York Red Bulls II	2024	MLS Next Pro	11	1	1	0	0	0	—		12	1
New York Red Bulls II	2025	MLS Next Pro	1	0	0	0	0	0	—		1	0
Career total			32	2	1	0	0	0	0	0	33	2
