= Jake LaCava =

American soccer player (born 2001)

Personal information
- Date of birth: January 12, 2001 (age 25)
- Place of birth: New Milford, Connecticut, United States
- Height: 6 ft 0 in (1.83 m)
- Position: Forward

Team information
- Current team: New Mexico United
- Number: 17

Youth career
- 2017–2018: Barça Residency Academy
- 2018–2019: LA Galaxy
- 2019–2020: New York Red Bulls

Senior career*
Years	Team	Apps	(Gls)
2020–2021	New York Red Bulls II	46	(11)
2022	New York Red Bulls	0	(0)
2022	→ Tampa Bay Rowdies (loan)	34	(13)
2023	Inter Miami	0	(0)
2023	Inter Miami CF II	6	(1)
2023	→ Tampa Bay Rowdies (loan)	21	(3)
2024	Charleston Battery	10	(0)
2024–2025	San Antonio FC	33	(2)
2026–	New Mexico United	24	(0)
- * Club domestic league appearances and goals as of 10:02, 10 November 2026 (UTC)

Jake LaCava (born January 21, 2001) is an American soccer player who plays as a forward for New Mexico United in the USL Championship.

== Career ==
=== Youth ===
LaCava spent time with academy teams at the Barça Academy in Arizona, LA Galaxy and New York Red Bulls. He also spent time on trial with Danish Superliga side Hobro IK in 2019.

=== New York Red Bulls II ===
On July 3, 2020, LaCava signed for USL Championship side New York Red Bulls II. He made his league debut for the club on July 17, 2020, appearing as a 67th-minute substitute in a 1–0 loss to Hartford Athletic. On August 29, 2020, LaCava scored his first two goals as a professional in a 3–2 victory over Loudoun United FC.

On April 30, 2021, LaCava scored his clubs first goal of the season in a 3–2 loss to Hartford Athletic.

Following the 2021 season, LaCava's contract with New York expired.

=== New York Red Bulls ===
On January 20, 2022, it was announced that LaCava had signed a one-year MLS contract with the New York Red Bulls, with options for the 2023, 2024, and 2025 seasons.

==== Tampa Bay Rowdies (loan) ====
Having signed an MLS contract with the New York Red Bulls, it was announced on January 20, 2022, that LaCava would spend an additional season in USL Championship, on loan to the Tampa Bay Rowdies.

=== Inter Miami ===
On November 11, 2022, LaCava was selected in the 2022 MLS Expansion Draft by St. Louis City SC. The club immediately traded him to Inter Miami CF in exchange for $150,000 of General Allocation Money. Miami declined LaCava's contract option following the 2023 season.

==== Return on loan to Tampa Bay ====
On June 9, 2023, LaCava returned to Tampa Bay Rowdies on loan for the remainder of the 2023 season. LaCava's loan concluded at the end of the 2023 season.

=== Charleston Battery ===
On December 22, 2023, it was announced that LaCava had joined USL Championship side Charleston Battery ahead of their 2024 season. LaCava appeared in 12 matches across all competitions for Charleston.

=== San Antonio FC ===
On June 3, 2024, LaCava joined San Antonio FC on a multi-year contract.

=== New Mexico United ===
On January 21st, 2026, LaCava joined New Mexico United for their 2026 season.

== Career statistics ==
As of June 8, 2021

Club	Season	League		Playoffs		Domestic Cup		Continental		Total	
Club	Season	Apps	Goals	Apps	Goals	Apps	Goals	Apps	Goals	Apps	Goals
New York Red Bulls II	2020	15	5	0	0	—		—		15	5
New York Red Bulls II	2021	31	6	0	0	—		—		31	6
Career total		46	11	0	0	0	0	0	0	46	11
