= Lewis Hilton =

English footballer (born 1993)

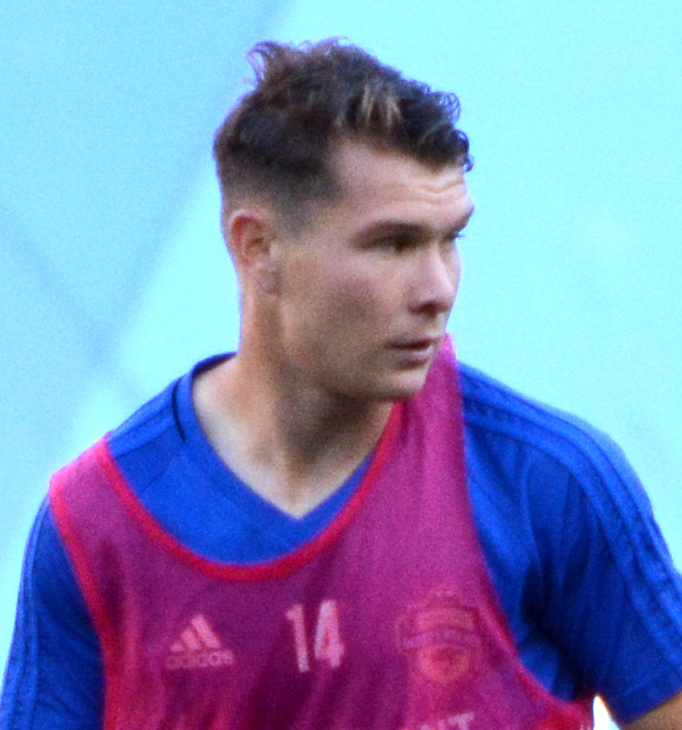
- Hilton with Charlotte Independence in 2017

Personal information
- Full name: Lewis Alexander Hilton
- Date of birth: 22 October 1993 (age 33)
- Place of birth: Truro, England
- Height: 1.73 m (5 ft 8 in)
- Position: Midfielder

Team information
- Current team: Tampa Bay Rowdies
- Number: 4

Youth career
- 2003–2008: Plymouth Argyle
- 2008–2009: Exeter City

College career
Years	Team	Apps	(Gls)
2012–2015	Young Harris Mountain Lions	80	(25)

Senior career*
Years	Team	Apps	(Gls)
2014–2015	Ocala Stampede	34	(11)
2016–2017	Charlotte Independence	59	(7)
2018–2019	Saint Louis FC	66	(7)
2020–	Tampa Bay Rowdies	160	(7)
- * Club domestic league appearances and goals as of 17:56, 8 November 2026 (UTC)

Lewis Alexander Hilton (born 22 October 1993) is an English professional footballer who plays for the Tampa Bay Rowdies in USL Championship.

== Career ==
=== Early career ===
Hilton spent five years playing for Plymouth Argyle as a youngster before spending a year with Exeter City. He then spent time at Hartpury College where he played against his future teammate Callum Ross. While at Hartpury College, Lewis worked with the Pro PASS4Soccer Scholarships Agency to secure his scholarship at Young Harris College.

=== College and amateur ===
Hilton played four years of college soccer at Young Harris College between 2012 and 2015. While at Young Harris, Hilton was named two-time NSCAA All-American, and in 2015 also earned Division II Conference Commissioners Association Men's Soccer All-American honors.

While at college, Hilton played with Premier Development League side Ocala Stampede in 2014 and 2015.

=== Professional career ===
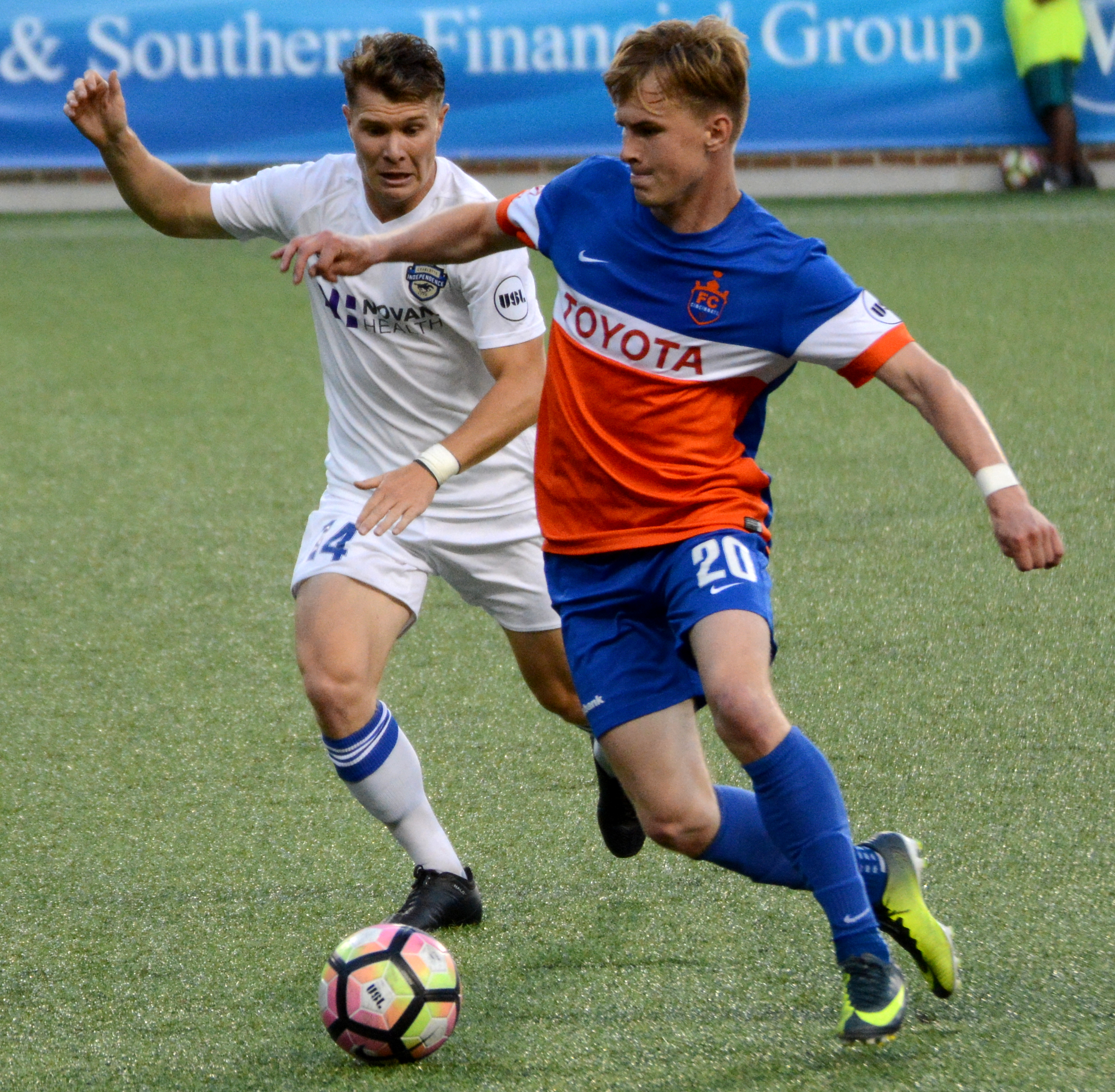
Hilton (left) with Charlotte Independence in 2017

Hilton signed with United Soccer League club Charlotte Independence in January 2016.

Hilton signed with USL side Saint Louis FC in January 2018.

Hilton joined the Tampa Bay Rowdies on 17 December 2019. In November 2024, Hilton re-signed with the 2025 USL Championship season.
