= Stuart Sternberg =

American sports businessman (born 1959)

Stuart L. Sternberg
- Born: August 8, 1959 (age 67); Brooklyn, New York, U.S.
- Education: St. John's University (B.A.)
- Occupation: Investor
- Known for: Former owner of the Tampa Bay Rays
- Spouse: Lisa Kampfmann Sternberg
- Children: 4
- Parent(s): Beverly Tartell Sternberg; Samuel Sternberg

Stuart L. Sternberg (born August 8, 1959) is an American Wall Street investor. He was the principal shareholder of the ownership group that owned the Tampa Bay Rays and acted as the team's Managing General Partner from 2005 to 2025.

== Early life ==
The youngest of three children, Sternberg was born on August 8, 1959, and raised in a Jewish family on Avenue M in the Canarsie neighborhood of New York's Brooklyn borough He is the son of Beverly (née Tartell) and Samuel Sternberg and his parents owned a pillow shop on Flatbush Avenue. His passion for baseball developed in his childhood while playing the game in the streets and playgrounds of his neighborhood. One of Sternberg's most cherished memories is when he saw Sandy Koufax pitch while attending his first Major League game with his father at Shea Stadium in 1965. Sternberg has played in various organized baseball leagues over his lifetime and coached his two sons' Little League teams for five years. He attended yeshiva through third grade, wearing a kippah every day and went to Canarsie High School.

== Career in the financial services industry ==
In 1978, Sternberg began his professional career trading equity options part-time at the American Stock Exchange while attending St. John's University earning a degree in finance. After college Sternberg was hired by investment group Spear, Leeds & Kellogg, and he eventually became a partner in the firm before he moved to Goldman Sachs. In 2002 he retired from the company as a partner. He has served on several committees and advisory boards in the financial securities industry.

== Major League Baseball ==
Sternberg purchased a 48% plurality-share in the previously named Devil Rays (now known as the Tampa Bay Rays) in May 2004 from Vince Naimoli and took over operations becoming a managing general partner in October 2005. He structured his bid for controlling interest in the team with fellow Goldman Sachs partner Matthew Silverman whom he hired as the team's president.

Between 2019 and 2023, the Rays qualified for the playoffs every season despite the fact that they play in the same East Division as the Boston Red Sox and New York Yankees, who perennially have amongst the highest player payrolls in the major leagues. Yet attendance for home games at Tropicana Field in St. Petersburg has been among the lowest in the big leagues over the years. In a June 2011 Tampa Tribune interview, Sternberg remarked, "I know we can't sustain ourselves like this. It hasn't gotten better. If anything, it's worse. To run a payroll like we do now, basically the second-lowest in baseball, and barely keep our nose above water, we can't sustain that. Baseball is just not going to stand for it anymore. And they'll find a place for me. They won't find a place here though." He reiterated his stance and raised the specter of relocation after the Rays were eliminated from the playoffs that season. However he has stated several times that he is staying with the team and they are not moving anywhere within the coming years.

In October 2014, it was reported that Sternberg frustrated with efforts to build a new stadium in the Tampa Bay area, had discussions with Wall Street associates about moving the Rays to Montreal, which has not had an MLB franchise since the Montreal Expos moved to Washington, D.C. in 2005 to become the Washington Nationals.

In March 2025, the Tampa Bay Rays announced the organization would be pulling out of its deal to build a stadium in St. Petersburg, resulting in pressure from local officials and fans for Sternberg to sell the team.

In June 2025, the Rays released a statement saying that they had entered into "exclusive discussions" with a group led by Jacksonville real estate executive Patrick Zalupski. Reports suggested that the sale would be for approximately $1.7 billion. One month later, it was reported that Sternberg had reached an agreement to sell the Rays to Zalupski's group.

== Personal life ==
Sternberg currently resides in Rye, New York with his wife, Lisa, and four children, Sanford, Jake, Natalie, and Ella.

== Sources ==
- Front Office Directory
- Team's new boss: 'Baseball junkie' with business savvy
- An Open Letter to Stuart Sternberg from BaseLine Report: Why There is Hope for the Rays
