= Stuart Dobson =

English footballer

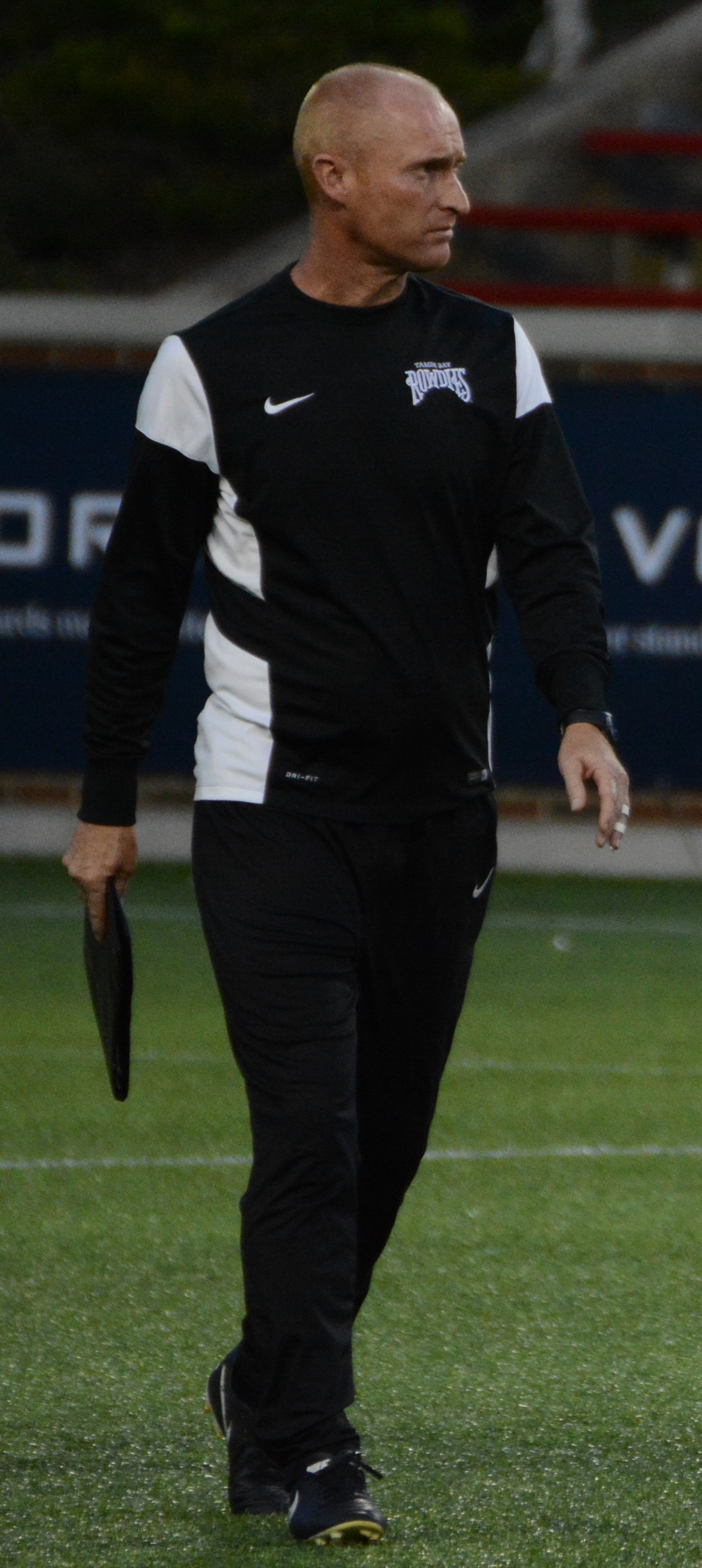
- Dobson coaching the Tampa Bay Rowdies in 2017

Personal information
- Date of birth: 10 February 1970 (age 56)
- Place of birth: Beverley, England
- Height: 6 ft 3 in (1.91 m)
- Position: Goalkeeper

Team information
- Current team: Tampa Bay Rowdies

Youth career
- Reading
- 1992–1994: Portland Pilots

Senior career*
Years	Team	Apps	(Gls)
1995	Portland Pride (indoor)	10	(0)
1995–1996	Chicago Power (indoor)	20	(0)
1996–1997	Tampa Bay Terror (indoor)	46	(0)
1996	Cascade Surge	?	(0)
1997–1998	Montreal Impact (indoor)	8	(0)
1998	Harrisburg Heat (indoor)	11	(0)
1998	Mississippi Beach Kings (indoor)	27	(0)
1998–1999	Buffalo Blizzard (indoor)	26	(0)
1999	Utah Freezz (indoor)	21	(0)
2000–2001	Buffalo Blizzard (indoor)	3	(0)
2001–2006	Philadelphia KiXX (indoor)	50	(0)
Total		222	(0)

Managerial career
- 2007–2008: New Jersey Ironmen (goalkeepers)
- 2008–2012: UC Santa Barbara Gauchos (goalkeepers)
- 2012–2015: Akron Zips (goalkeepers)
- 2015–: Tampa Bay Rowdies (goalkeepers)
- 2023: Tampa Bay Rowdies (interim)
- * Club domestic league appearances and goals

Stuart Dobson (born 10 February 1970) is an English retired footballer who played in various indoor soccer leagues in the United States. He serves as the goalkeeping coach for the Tampa Bay Rowdies of the USL Championship.

== Playing career ==
=== Continental Indoor Soccer League ===
Dobson started his professional career with Portland Pride of the Continental Indoor Soccer League in June 1995 where he appeared in 10 matches.

=== National Professional Soccer League ===
He then joined Chicago Power of the National Professional Soccer League for the 1995–96 NPSL season and appeared in 20 matches before being traded to Tampa Bay Terror in exchange for Bill Andracki. He appeared in a further seven games for Tampa Bay that season. In the Terror's offseason, Dobson featured in at least seven outdoor matches for Cascade Surge for the 1996 USISL Professional League. He appeared in 39 more matches for the 1996–97 season, leading the Terror to the playoffs where he played three more matches.

Dobson joined Montreal Impact for the club's first season of indoor soccer in 1997, appearing in eight matches before being traded for cash to Harrisburg Heat. He made a further 11 appearances for the Heat. However, Dobson's stop in Harrisburg was short as the Heat traded him on 17 November 1998 to the Buffalo Blizzard.

He remained in Buffalo, on and off, until the National Professional Soccer League ceased operations after the 2000–01 season. In his first year with the club, Dobson led them to the playoffs, making three appearances, after playing in 26 regular season matches. He didn't appear in the 1999–2000 season, but made his final three appearances for the Blizzard in the 2000–01 season.

=== Eastern Indoor Soccer League ===
In the 1998 off-season of the NPSL, Dobson played in the Eastern Indoor Soccer League, a regional minor indoor soccer league that lasted only two seasons. He was acquired by Mississippi Beach Kings on 7 May 1998 ahead of the final 1998 EISL season. With Mississippi, Dobson went to the playoffs, but ultimately lost by one goal in the championship game to Lafayette SwampCats. Dobson was named the 1998 Eastern Indoor Soccer League Goalkeeper of the Year and was placed on the 1998 EISL All-League Team.

=== World Indoor Soccer League ===
In the 1999 off-season of the NPSL, Dobson joined World Indoor Soccer League team Utah Freezz and made 21 appearances before losing in the playoffs. He re-signed with the club in June 2000.

=== Major Indoor Soccer League ===
Dobson found a home with Philadelphia KiXX of the Major Indoor Soccer League when he was selected in the 8th round (45th overall) in the 2001 MISL Dispersal Draft. He made 50 regular season appearances from 2001 through 2006 and won the 2001–02 MISL Championship.

== Coaching career ==
Dobson was named Goalkeepers Coach for Akron Zips men's soccer on 15 August 2012 under former head coach Caleb Porter. He previously held the same role with UC Santa Barbara Gauchos men's soccer which he joined in 2008 after being with New Jersey Ironmen and working with Tony Meola. On 15 January 2015, the Tampa Bay Rowdies introduced Dobson as their new goalkeepers coach, replacing the outgoing Slobodan Janjuš.

In July 2023, following Neill Collins' departure to join Barnsley as manager, Dobson assumed the role of interim head coach for the Rowdies.
