= Aarón Guillén =

Mexican footballer (born 1993)

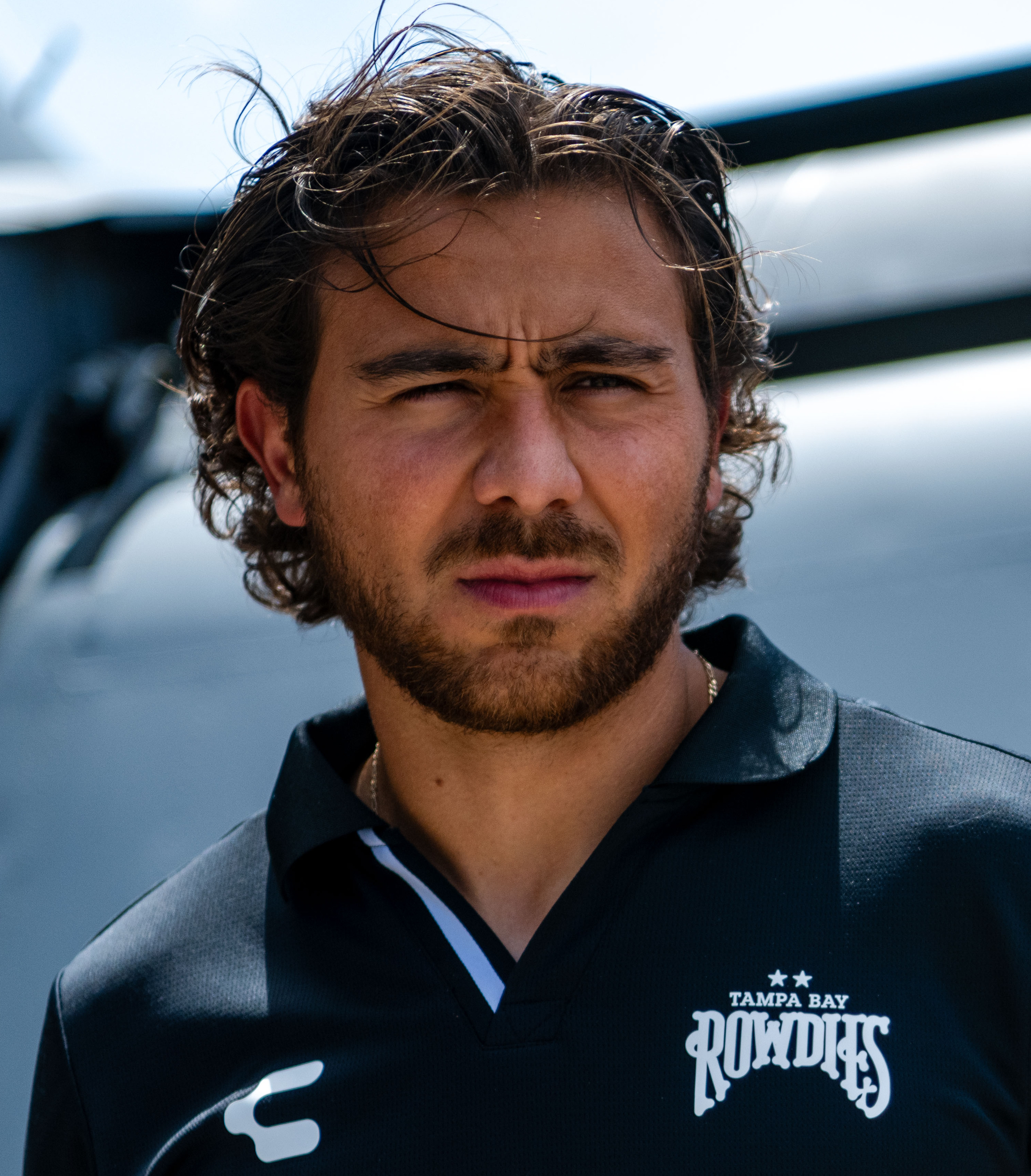
- Guillén with the Tampa Bay Rowdies in 2025

Personal information
- Date of birth: 23 June 1993 (age 33)
- Place of birth: Chihuahua, Mexico
- Height: 1.84 m (6 ft 0 in)
- Position: Defender

Team information
- Current team: Las Vegas Lights
- Number: 33

Youth career
- 2011–2012: FC Dallas

College career
Years	Team	Apps	(Gls)
2012–2015	Florida Gulf Coast Eagles	68	(1)

Senior career*
Years	Team	Apps	(Gls)
2013	Austin Aztex	11	(2)
2016–2017	FC Dallas	8	(0)
2017	→ Tulsa Roughnecks (loan)	3	(0)
2018–2019	North Carolina FC	57	(0)
2020–2025	Tampa Bay Rowdies	171	(2)
2026–	Las Vegas Lights	28	(1)
- * Club domestic league appearances and goals as of October 31, 2026

Aarón Guillén (born 23 June 1993) is a Mexican professional footballer who plays as a defender for USL Championship club Las Vegas Lights FC.

== Career ==
=== Professional ===
After four years of college soccer at Florida Gulf Coast University, Guillén signed a homegrown player contract with FC Dallas on January 5, 2016.

He made his professional debut on June 15, 2016 in a US Open Cup match against Oklahoma City Energy.

On August 5, 2017, Guillén was sent on a short-term loan to United Soccer League club Tulsa Roughnecks.

On December 12, 2025, Las Vegas Lights of the USL Championship announced they had signed Guillén through the 2027 season with a club option for 2028.

== Honours ==
Tampa Bay Rowdies

- USL Championship Eastern Conference: 2020
- USL Championship Regular Season Title: 2021

Individual

- USL Championship All League First Team: 2022
- USL Championship All League Second Team: 2021
