= Matthew Silverman =

American professional baseball executive

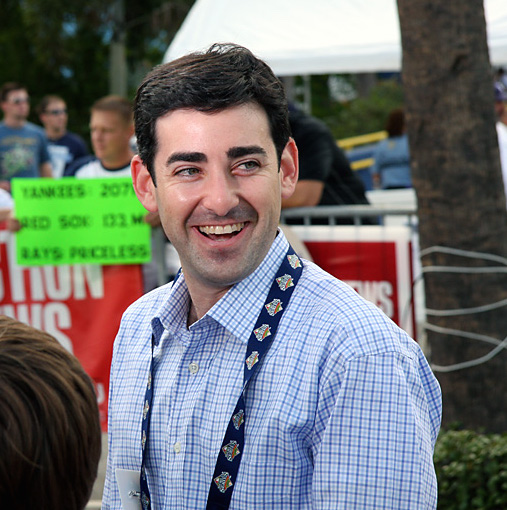

Tampa Bay Rays
- President (with Brian Auld)
- Born: May 20, 1976 (age 49); Dallas, Texas, U.S.

Matthew Silverman (born May 20, 1976) is an American professional baseball executive. He was the co-president, along with Brian Auld, of the Tampa Bay Rays of Major League Baseball (MLB).

== Biography ==
Silverman is Jewish and was raised in a Jewish family, He graduated cum laude from Harvard College in 1998 after graduating from St. Mark's School of Texas in Dallas.

Silverman began his career at Goldman Sachs in its merchant banking division. At the company he helped Stuart Sternberg structure his bid to purchase a controlling interest in Major League Baseball's Tampa Bay Devil Rays. Silverman was hired as president of the team and became part of the transition group that changed the name of the franchise from the Devil Rays to the Rays. Under his leadership, the team moved from last place to a berth in the World Series in 2008. In January 2009, Street & Smith's Sports Business Journal named Silverman to its 2009 "Forty Under 40" list which honors accomplished and promising sports executives under the age of 40.

Silverman served as team president for nine years before he was named the director of baseball operations in 2014. He returned to the role of team president in 2017 until 2025.

He currently resides in St. Petersburg, Florida, and he is the team representative at the Tampa Bay Partnership. He is a board member of the Pinellas Education Foundation, the Positive Coaching Alliance, the Hillsborough Education Foundation, and Starting Right, Now.

== See also ==
- Notable alumni of St. Mark's School of Texas

Sporting positions
Preceded by Andrew Friedman	Tampa Bay Rays General manager 2015–2016	Succeeded by Erik Neander
