= Brian Auld =

American baseball front office executive

Brian Auld is an American professional baseball executive. He was the co-president, along with Matthew Silverman, of the Tampa Bay Rays of Major League Baseball.

== Career ==
Auld received his bachelor's degree in economics and master's degree in education from Stanford University. He obtained his MBA from Harvard Business School. He became the lead teacher and director of development at East Palo Alto Charter School in East Palo Alto, California.

Auld joined the Rays as their director of planning and development in June 2005, reporting to Matthew Silverman, the team's president. He was later promoted to senior vice president of business operations. When Andrew Friedman, the general manager of the Rays, left the team to become president of the Los Angeles Dodgers after the 2014 season, Silverman became the team's new general manager, with Auld being promoted to team president. He later became a senior advisor to the succeeding ownership group in 2025.

== Personal life ==
Auld grew up in Berkeley, California; Scarsdale, New York; Tokyo, Japan; and Dallas, Texas. He graduated from the St. Mark's School of Texas. At Stanford, he was captain of the varsity lacrosse team. He lives in St. Petersburg, Florida, with his wife and three children.

== See also ==
- Notable alumni of St. Mark's School of Texas
