= Leo Fernandes =

Brazilian soccer player (born 1991)

Personal information
- Full name: Leonardo Fernandes
- Date of birth: 23 December 1991 (age 34)
- Place of birth: São Paulo, Brazil
- Height: 1.84 m (6 ft 0 in)
- Position: Midfielder

Youth career
- Istria Met Oval
- 2003–2009: BW Gottschee

College career
Years	Team	Apps	(Gls)
2009–2012	Stony Brook Seawolves		

Senior career*
Years	Team	Apps	(Gls)
2010–2011	Brooklyn Knights	17	(3)
2012	Reading United	10	(0)
2013–2016	Philadelphia Union	32	(2)
2013	→ Harrisburg City Islanders (loan)	2	(1)
2014	→ Harrisburg City Islanders (loan)	3	(0)
2015	→ New York Cosmos (loan)	31	(10)
2016	→ Bethlehem Steel (loan)	14	(1)
2017–2025	Tampa Bay Rowdies	173	(40)
- * Club domestic league appearances and goals as of 26 October 2025

Leonardo Fernandes (born 23 December 1991) is a former Brazilian professional footballer who played as a midfielder.

== Early life ==
Fernandes was born in São Paulo but raised in North Babylon, New York, and played at Stony Brook University from 2009 to 2012. In his senior season at Stony Brook, the left-footed Fernandes started all 18 matches and led his team in goals (9) and assists (7). He was selected to the 2012 All-America East first team and named America East Midfielder of the Year for the third consecutive season. Fernandes left Stony Brook as the team's all-time leader in points scored.

== Career ==
=== Philadelphia Union ===
On 22 January 2013, Fernandes was selected as the 62nd overall pick in the 2013 MLS Supplemental Draft by Philadelphia Union. He signed with the club on 1 March 2013. Serving mostly as a reserve role for the Union for his first season, Fernandes began to break into the starting line-up during the 2014 season, scoring twice.

=== Harrisburg City Islanders ===
For the 2013 and 2014 seasons, Fernandes spent temporary stints being loaned to Philadelphia's former USL affiliate, Harrisburg City Islanders, making five appearances for the club and scoring once.

=== New York Cosmos ===
For the 2015 season, the Union sent Fernandes out on loan to experience regular minutes throughout the season. In January 2015, he signed a year long loan deal with the New York Cosmos. The loan move proved successful as Fernandes became a regular starter for the Cosmos, who would go on to win the 2015 NASL Championship. Through the season he scored a career high ten goals across all competitions. His efforts were recognized, winning the 2015 NASL Young Player of the Year Award.

=== Bethlehem Steel FC ===
The formation of Bethlehem Steel FC prompted the Union to have Fernandes return to the Philadelphia organization. He would become a regular starter for Steel FC with intermittent appearances for the first team. Fernandes finished the season with fourteen appearances and scoring once.

=== Tampa Bay Rowdies ===
Fernandes signed with USL Championship club Tampa Bay Rowdies in 2017. On 14 July 2022, Fernandes was named USL Championship Player of the Month for June 2022 after scoring five goals throughout the month.

In February 2023, Fernandes ruptured his Achilles tendon during a preseason game. The Rowdies announced on 3 March 2023 that he would miss the 2023 USL Championship season.

In November 2024, Fernandes re-signed with the 2025 USL Championship season. Following the 2025 season, Fernandes announced his retirement from playing professional football.

== Career statistics ==
=== Club ===
Club performance			League		Cup		Continental		Total	
Season	Club	League	Apps	Goals	Apps	Goals	Apps	Goals	Apps	Goals
US			League		Open Cup		North America		Total	
2013	Philadelphia Union	MLS	7	0	2	0	0	0	8	0
2013	Harrisburg City Islanders (loan)	USL Pro	2	1	0	0	0	0	2	1
2014	Philadelphia Union	MLS	13	2	2	0	0	0	15	2
2014	Harrisburg City Islanders (loan)	USL	3	0	0	0	0	0	3	0
2015	New York Cosmos (loan)	NASL	28	8	3	2	0	0	31	10
2016	Philadelphia Union	MLS	12	0	3	0	0	0	15	0
2016	Bethlehem Steel FC (loan)	USL	14	1	0	0	0	0	14	1
Total	US		79	12	10	2	0	0	88	14
Career total			79	12	10	2	0	0	88	14

Updated 26 October 2016

== Honors ==
=== New York Cosmos ===
- North American Soccer League Supporters' Trophy: 2015
- North American Soccer League Soccer Bowl: 2015

=== Individual ===
- North American Soccer League Young Player of the Year: 2015

=== Individual ===
- USL Championship Most Valuable Player: 2022
