= 2024 Charleston Battery season =

Season of a professional football team

Charleston Battery
2024 season
- President: Rob Salvatore
- Head coach: Ben Pirmann
- Stadium: Patriots Point Soccer Complex
- USL Championship: Eastern Conference: 2nd
- USL Playoffs: Lost to Rhode Island FC in Conference Final
- U.S. Open Cup: Round of 16
- Top goalscorer: League: Nick Markanich; All: Nick Markanich
Home colors	Away colors

The 2024 Charleston Battery season was the club's 34th year of existence and their 21st season in the second tier of the United States soccer league system. It was their fourteenth season in the USL Championship (USLC) as part of the Eastern Conference.

== Background ==
The Battery finished an impressive 2023 season with a 17-9-8 record. They finished the regular season in third place and advanced to the USL Championship final where they were beaten by Phoenix Rising FC. Charleston ended their US Open Cup run in the Round of 32 with a 1–0 loss to Inter Miami CF.

Head coach Ben Pirmann was a finalist for the 2023 Coach of the Year award and Fidel Barajas was named 2023 Young Player of the Year.

== Season Squad ==
Squad No.	Name	Nationality	Position(s)	Date of birth (age)
Goalkeepers
1	Adam Grinwis	(United States)	GK	December 26, 1999 (age 26)
24	Daniel Kuzemka	(United States)	GK	September 23, 1998 (age 27)
99	Enzo Mori	(United States)	GK	April 21, 2006 (age 19)
Defenders
2	Mark Segbers	(United States)	DF	April 18, 1996 (age 29)
3	Josh Drack	(United States)	DF	September 22, 1999 (age 26)
5	Leland Archer	(Trinidad and Tobago)	DF	August 1, 1996 (age 29)
16	Graham Smith	(United States)	DF	November 25, 1995 (age 30)
23	Juan Sebastián Palma	(Colombia)	DF	July 18, 1999 (age 26)
62	Nathan Dossantos	(Canada)	DF	December 26, 1999 (age 26)
Midfielders
4	Chris Allan	(England)	MF	September 27, 1998 (age 27)
6	Aaron Molloy	(Republic of Ireland)	MF	January 11, 1997 (age 29)
8	Emilio Ycaza	(United States)	MF	July 10, 1997 (age 28)
10	Arturo Rodríguez	(Mexico)	MF	December 15, 1998 (age 27)
19	Robbie Crawford	(Scotland)	MF	March 19, 1993 (age 32)
32	Charles Dennis	(United States)	MF	September 13, 2004 (age 21)
33	Matthew Dean	(United States)	MF	February 2, 2006 (age 20)
34	Beadyn Cobb	(United States)	MF	January 12, 2006 (age 20)
80	Juan David Torres	(Colombia)	MF	March 31, 2001 (age 22)
Forwards
9	MD Myers	(United States)	FW	May 4, 2001 (age 24)
11	Diego Gutierrez	(United States)	FW	January 5, 1999 (age 27)
13	Nick Markanich	(United States)	FW	December 26, 1999 (age 26)
36	Jackson Conway	(United States)	FW	March 12, 2001 (age 24)

Last updated: 25 July 2024.
Source: Charleston Battery, USL Championship

== Transfers ==
=== In ===
Pos.	Player	Signed from	Details	Date	Ref
MF	Aaron Molloy	Memphis 901 FC	Free Transfer	December 4, 2023	
DF	Leland Archer	Resigned from Free Agency	Free Transfer	December 6, 2023	
DF	Graham Smith	Memphis 901 FC	Free Transfer	December 11, 2023	
DF	Josh Drack	Huntsville City FC	Free Transfer	December 13, 2023	
DF	Mark Segbers	Resigned from Free Agency		December 19, 2023	
FW	Jake LaCava	Inter Miami CF	Free Transfer	December 22, 2023	
FW	Diego Gutierrez	Portland Timbers	Free Transfer	January 17, 2024	
GK	Adam Grinwis	Orlando City SC	Free Transfer	January 18, 2024	
FW	Jackson Conway	Atlanta United FC	Free Transfer	January 19, 2024	
DF	Nathan Dossantos	Pittsburgh Riverhounds SC	Free Transfer	January 30, 2024	
FW	MD Myers	New York City FC II	Undisclosed Fee	February 1, 2024	
AMF	Juan David Torres	Millonarios F.C.	Free Transfer	February 15, 2024	

=== Out ===
Player	To	Details	Date	Ref.
Aidan Apodaca	Free agency	Contract Expired	December 1, 2023	
Leland Archer	Free agency	Contract Expired	December 1, 2023	
Handwalla Bwana	Free agency	Contract Expired	December 1, 2023	
A. J. Cochran	Free agency	Contract Expired	December 1, 2023	
Derek Dodson	Free agency	Contract Expired	December 1, 2023	
Joe Schmidt	Free agency	Contract Expired	December 1, 2023	
Mark Segbers	Free agency	Contract Expired	December 1, 2023	
Augustine Williams	Free agency	Contract Expired	December 1, 2023	
Beto Avila	Houston Dynamo FC	Loan Expired	December 1, 2023	
Joe Schmidt	Hartford Athletic	Free Transfer	December 5, 2023	
A. J. Paterson	Birmingham Legion FC	Free Transfer	December 12, 2023	
Trey Muse	Portland Timbers	Undisclosed Fee	January 5, 2024	
Fidel Barajas	Real Salt Lake		January 11, 2024	
Derek Dodson	Minnesota United FC	Free Transfer	January 15, 2024	
Augustine Williams	Indy Eleven	Free Transfer	January 24, 2024	
Pierre Reedy	Spokane Velocity	Free Transfer	January 29, 2024	
Tristan Trager	Monterey Bay FC	Unknown Fee	January 31, 2024	

Last updated: 4 February 2024.
Source: Charleston Battery, Football Transfers

== Competitions ==
All times in Eastern Time Zone.

=== Preseason Friendlies ===
February 3, 2024 Preseason	Charleston Battery	0–0	Coastal Carolina
		Report

February 9, 2024 Preseason	Greenville Triumph	0–3	Charleston Battery
		Report

February 17, 2024 Preseason	Charleston Battery	2–0	Charlotte Independence
		Report

February 21, 2024 Preseason	Charleston Battery	1–1	College of Charleston
7:00 PM EST		Report

February 24, 2024 Preseason	Charleston Battery	1–1	Crown Legacy FC
7:00 PM EST		Report

March 3, 2024 Preseason	Tormenta FC	1–3	Charleston Battery
7:00 PM EST		Report

=== USL Championship ===
==== Eastern Conference ====
Pos	Team	Pld	W	L	T	GF	GA	GD	Pts	Qualification
1	Louisville City FC (S)	34	24	6	4	86	43	+43	76	Playoffs
2	Charleston Battery	34	18	6	10	68	35	+33	64	Playoffs
3	Detroit City FC	34	15	8	11	46	32	+14	56	Playoffs
4	Indy Eleven	34	14	11	9	49	50	−1	51	Playoffs
5	Rhode Island FC	34	12	7	15	56	41	+15	51	Playoffs

Source: USL Championship Standings
Rules for classification: 1) head-to-head points; 2) head-to-head goal differential; 3) points-per game within conference; 4) total wins; 5) total goal differential; 6) total goals scored; 7) points earned against top four Conference finishers; 8) disciplinary points; 9) coin toss or drawing of lots
(S) Players' Shield winner

Overall								Home						Away					
Pld	W	D	L	GF	GA	GD	Pts	W	D	L	GF	GA	GD	W	D	L	GF	GA	GD
20	11	7	2	40	16	+24	40	7	1	1	24	6	+18	4	6	1	16	10	+6

Source: Match reports

==== Results by round ====
Round	1	2	3	4	5	6	7	8	9	10	11	12	13	14	15	16	17	18	19	20	21	22	23	24	25	26	27	28	29	30	31	32	33	34
Ground	A	A	H	A	A	H	A	A	H	H	A	H	A	H	A	A	H	H	A	H	A	A	H	H	A	H	A	H	A	H	H	A	H	H
Result																																		
Position																																		

Updated to match(es) played on February 10, 2024. Source: Match reports
A = Away; H = Home; W = Win; D = Draw; L = Loss

==== Matches ====
March 9, 2024 1	North Carolina FC	0–0	Charleston Battery	Cary, North Carolina
	Somersall (yellow card) 39'; Placias (yellow card) 87'	Report	LaCava (yellow card) 20'; Conway (yellow card) 84'; Torres (yellow card) 90'+4'	Stadium: WakeMed Soccer Park; Attendance: 2,576; Referee: Jeremy Scheer

March 16, 2024 2	Oakland Roots SC	1–1	Charleston Battery	Oakland, California
10:00 PM	Tamacas (yellow card) 6'; Rodriguez (yellow card) 43'; Alekseev 49'; Chéry (yellow card) 66'	Report	Palma (yellow card) 15'; Markanich 35' (yellow card) 77'; Torres (yellow card) 63'; Molloy (yellow card) 90'+5'; Grinwis (yellow card) 90'+5'	Stadium: Pioneer Stadium; Attendance: 4,261; Referee: Ricardo Fierro

March 23, 2024 3	Charleston Battery	4–0	New Mexico United	Mount Pleasant, South Carolina
7:30 PM	Markanich 17'; Ycaza (yellow card) 19'; Rodriguez 56'; Molloy 64'; Conway 90'	Report	Seymore (yellow card) 9'; Bailey (yellow card) 20'; Akale (yellow card) 33'	Stadium: Patriots Point Soccer Complex; Attendance: 2,958 Seymore (yellow card) 9'; Bailey (yellow card) 20'; Akale (yellow card) 33'; Referee: Nabil Bensalah

March 30, 2024 4	Miami FC	1–2	Charleston Battery	Miami, Florida
	Gavilanes 9', (yellow card) 63'; Cardona (yellow card) 53'; Gagliardi (yellow card) 61'	Report	Markanich 11'; Allan (yellow card) 58'; Myers 82'; Crawford (yellow card) 88'	Stadium: Riccardo Silva Stadium; Attendance: 1,107; Referee: Adam Kilpatrick

April 6, 2024 5	Rhode Island FC	0–0	Charleston Battery	Smithfield, Rhode Island
	Holstad (yellow card) 4'; Dikwa (yellow card) 22'; McGlynn (yellow card) 28' (yellow-red card) 70'; Nodarse (yellow card) 31'; Twumasi (yellow card) 90+7'	Report	Ycaza (yellow card) 34'	Stadium: Beirne Stadium; Attendance: 3,729; Referee: Joshua Encarnación

April 9, 2024 6	Charleston Battery	3–2	Louisville City FC	Mount Pleasant, South Carolina
7:00 PM	Myers 10'; Markanich 22' (pen.), 30'; Torres (yellow card) 54'; Segbers (yellow card) 89'	Report	Gonzalez 9'; Charpie (yellow card) 45'; Davila 52', (yellow card) 90+8'; Harris (yellow card) 54'; Cruz (yellow card) 75'; Las (yellow card) 84'	Stadium: Patriots Point Soccer Complex; Attendance: 4,465 Alexis Da Silva; Referee: Jeremy Smith

April 13, 2024 7	Indy Eleven	2–4	Charleston Battery	Indianapolis, Indiana
7:00 PM	Ikoba 27'; Guenzatti 28'; Chapman-Page (yellow card) 45+2'; Blake (yellow card) 52'; Stanley (yellow card) 68'; King (yellow card) 90+1'	Report	Ycaza 19'; Allan (yellow card) 31'; Markanich 45+2'; King 75' (o.g.); Smith (yellow card) 78'; Myers 86'	Stadium: Michael A. Carroll Stadium; Attendance: 8,556; Referee: Greg Dopka

April 20, 2024 8	FC Tulsa	1–4	Charleston Battery	Tulsa, Oklahoma
7:00 PM	Portillo 37' (pen.)	Report	Myers 9', 84'; Torres 31'; Markanich 41'	Stadium: ONEOK Field; Attendance: 3,454; Referee: Kyle Johnston

April 27, 2024 9	Charleston Battery	6-0	Las Vegas Lights FC	Mount Pleasant, South Carolina
4:00 PM	Markanich 4' 30' 37' (pen.) 49'; Myers 22'; Molloy 81'	Report	Arozarena (yellow card) 24'; Adams (yellow card) 45'+5'	Stadium: Patriots Point Soccer Complex; Attendance: 4,520; Referee: Joe Surgan

May 4, 2024 10	Charleston Battery	1–0	Hartford Athletic	Mount Pleasant, South Carolina
5:00 PM	Markanich 12'; Dossantos (yellow card) 36'; Ycaza (yellow card) 73'	Report	Hodge (yellow card) 19'; Beckford (yellow card) 40'; Chapman (yellow card) 48'	Stadium: Patriots Point Soccer Complex; Attendance: 3,785; Referee: Matthew Thompson

May 15, 2024 11	Birmingham Legion FC	0–1	Charleston Battery	Birmingham, Alabama
8:00 PM	Martínez (yellow card) 46'; Crognale (yellow card) 74'; Tabortetaka (yellow card) 86'	Report	Ycaza 61'; Molloy (yellow card) 69'; Conway (yellow card) 88'	Stadium: Protective Stadium; Attendance: 3,937; Referee: Jeremy Scheer

May 24, 2024 12	Charleston Battery	1–2	El Paso Locomotive FC	Mount Pleasant, South Carolina
	Allan (yellow card) 44' (yellow-red card) 45'+2'; Torres (yellow card) 56'; Conway 87'; Dossantos (yellow card) 90'+2'	Report	Rose (yellow card) 17'; Rivas (yellow card) 18'; Moreno (yellow card) 29' (goal) 69', 90'+2'; Akinyode (yellow card) 60'; Moshobane (yellow card) 67'; Yuma (yellow card) 90'+4'	Stadium: Patriots Point Soccer Complex; Attendance: 3,257; Referee: Alejo Calume

May 29, 2024 13	Monterey Bay FC	0–0	Charleston Battery	Seaside, California
	Robinson (yellow card) 78'; Rebollar (yellow card) 90'+1'	Report	Dossantos (yellow card) 25'	Stadium: Cardinale Stadium; Attendance: 3,423; Referee: Elvis Osmanovic

June 8, 2024 14	Charleston Battery	0–0	Pittsburgh Riverhounds	Mount Pleasant, SC
7:30 PM		Report	Walti (yellow card) 51'; Kizza (yellow card) 75'	Stadium: Patriots Point Soccer Complex; Attendance: 3,626; Referee: Thomas Snyder

June 15, 2024 15	Detroit City FC	2–0	Charleston Battery	Hamtramck, Michigan
7:00 PM	Amoo-Mensah (yellow card) 55'; Ry. Williams (yellow card) 72'; Rodriguez 86' (pen.); Murphy (yellow card) 90+2'; Amoh 90+4'	Report	Markanich (yellow card) 33'; Gutierrez (yellow card) 40'; Pirmann (yellow card) 42'; Ycaza (yellow card) 52'; Allan (yellow card) 69'; Segbers (yellow card) 88'	Stadium: Keyworth Stadium; Attendance: 7,172; Referee: Brandon Stevis

June 22, 2024 16	Phoenix Rising FC	0–0	Charleston Battery	Tempe, Arizona
9:30 PM	Fuenmayor (yellow card) 3'; Torres (yellow card) 27'; Hernández (yellow card) 38'; Boye (yellow card) 67'	Report	Smith (yellow card) 63'	Stadium: Phoenix Rising FC Soccer Complex; Attendance: 7,244; Referee: Abdou Ndiaye

June 28, 2024 17	Charleston Battery	5–2	North Carolina FC	Mount Pleasant, SC
7:30 PM	Markanich (yellow card) 45'+5' (goal) 80'; Myers 58' 90'+2' 90'+8' (pen.); Dossantos (yellow card) 84'; Rodriguez (yellow card) 88'; Conway 90'+4'	Report	Conway 27' (yellow card) 37'; Batista (yellow card) 42'; Armstrong (yellow card) 45'+3' (yellow-red card) 50'; Brewer 45'+6'; McGuire (yellow card) 90'+1'	Stadium: Patriots Point Soccer Complex; Attendance: 3,876; Referee: Abdou Ndiaye

July 6, 2024 18	Charleston Battery	2–0	Birmingham Legion FC	Mount Pleasant, SC
7:00 PM	Markanich 43' (pen.) 70'	Report	Prosper (yellow card) 21'; Crognale (yellow card) 40'; Kavita (yellow card) 54'; Perez (yellow card) 90'	Stadium: Patriots Point Soccer Complex; Attendance: 3,396; Referee: Lorenzo Hernandez

July 12, 2024 19	Hartford Athletic	2–2	Charleston Battery	Hartford, Connecticut
7:30	Mamadou 20'; Chapman (yellow card) 36'; Ngalina 43' (yellow card) 90'+5'; Ribeiro (yellow card) 50' (yellow-red card) 50'; Epps (yellow card) 80'	Report	Crawford (yellow card) 37'; Ycaza (yellow card) 41'; Segbres (yellow card) 59'; Dossantos 70'; Markanich 90'	Stadium: Trinity Health Stadium; Attendance: 4,809; Referee: Elijio Arreguin

July 19, 2024 20	Charleston Battery	2–0	Miami FC	Mount Pleasant, SC
7:30 PM	Markanich 47' 51' (pen.); Crawford (yellow card) 83'	Report	Lopez (yellow card) 45'+2'; Murana (yellow card) 50'; Santana (yellow card) 87'	Stadium: Patriots Point Soccer Complex; Attendance: 2,883; Referee: Elvis Osmanovic

July 24, 2024 21	Loudoun United FC	1–2	Charleston Battery	Leesburg, Virginia
1:00 PM	Ryan 79'; Awuah (yellow card) 90'+8'	Report	Dossantos 11'; Markanich 25'; Archer (yellow card) 50'; Ycaza (yellow card) 58'; Molloy (yellow card) 77'	Stadium: Segra Field; Attendance: 2,512; Referee: Adam Kilpatrick

July 27, 2024 22	Tampa Bay Rowdies	4-2	Charleston Battery	St. Petersburg, Florida
7:30 PM	Arteaga 38' (pen.) (yellow card) 90'+6'; Crisostomo (yellow card) 44'; Pérez 46' (yellow card) 55'; Munjoma (yellow card) 76'; Worth 87'; Rivera 90'+12'	Report	Torres 8' (yellow card) 29'; Smith 13' (yellow card) 90'+7'; Grinwis (red card) 83'	Stadium: Al Lang Stadium; Attendance: 5,705; Referee: John Griggs

August 2, 2024 23	Charleston Battery	5–0	Indy Eleven	Mount Pleasant, SC
7:30 PM	Myers 52'; Ycaza 70'; Markanich 78'; Conway 85'; Crawford 90+5'	Report	A. Williams (yellow card) 51'; Diz Pe (yellow card) 67'; Neidlinger (yellow card) 77'	Stadium: Patriots Point Soccer Complex; Attendance: 2,845; Referee: Joshua Encarnación

August 10, 2024 24	Charleston Battery	3–1	Memphis 901 FC	Mount Pleasant, South Carolina
7:30 PM	Markanich (yellow card) 30' (goal) 41'; Myers 55'; Ycaza (yellow card) 64'; Torres 72'	Report	Turci (yellow card) 26' (yellow-red card) 37'; Careaga 50'	Stadium: Patriots Point Soccer Complex; Attendance: 2,579; Referee: Nabil Bensalah

August 17, 2024 25	Louisville City FC	3–1	Charleston Battery	Louisville, Kentucky
8:00 PM	McFadden 17'; Dia (yellow card) 22'; Harris (yellow card) 25'; Wilson 82'; Goodrum 82'	Report	Archer (yellow card) 54'; Segbers (yellow card) 54'; Smith (yellow card) 63', (goal) 90+2'; Chapman (yellow card) 70'	Stadium: Lynn Family Stadium; Attendance: 13,526; Referee: Elton Garcia; Assistant referees: John Krill; Seun Yinka-Kehinde; Fourth official: Salvador Flores

August 24, 2024 26	Charleston Battery	6–0	Orange County SC	Mount Pleasant, South Carolina
7:30 PM	Markanich 7' (pen.) 48', 75'; Rodríguez 39'; Segbers (red card) 62'; Myers 72', 89'	Report	Doghman (red card) 5'; Casiple (yellow card) 77'	Stadium: Patriots Point Soccer Complex; Attendance: 4,302; Referee: Matthew Corrigan

August 31, 2024 27	San Antonio FC	1–1	Charleston Battery	San Antonio, Texas
9:00 PM	Nogueira (yellow card) 7'; Taintor (yellow card) 19'; Hernandez 51' (yellow card) 90'+5'; Blanco (yellow card) 83'; Gomez (yellow card) 90'+7'; Solignac (yellow card) 90'+9'; Gongora (yellow card) 90'+10'	Report	Dossantos (yellow card) 2'; Archer (yellow card) 28'; Rodríguez (yellow card) 62'; Torres 84'	Stadium: Toyota Field; Attendance: 6,367; Referee: Muhammad Hassan

September 7, 2024 28	Charleston Battery	2–1	Sacramento Republic FC	Mount Pleasant, SC
7:30 PM	Torres (yellow card) 45'+1'; Markanich 50'; Chapman (yellow card) 79'; Ycaza 87'; Smith (yellow card) 90'+2'; Molloy (yellow card) 90'+7'	Report	Sanchez 18'; Desmond (yellow card) 63'; Portillo (yellow card) 66'; Ross (yellow card) 73'; Gurr (yellow card) 88'	Stadium: Patriots Point Soccer Complex; Attendance: 3,525; Referee: Alyssa Nichols

September 14, 2024 29	Colorado Springs Switchbacks FC	2-0	Charleston Battery	Colorado Springs, Colorado
8:00 PM	Dhillon 14' (yellow card) 35'; Herrera (yellow card) 64'; Magee (yellow card) 66'; Damus 73' (pen.); Hanya (yellow card) 74'	Report	Allan (yellow card) 69'	Stadium: Weidner Field; Attendance: 8,023; Referee: Ricardo Fierro

September 21, 2024 30	Charleston Battery	3-1	Tampa Bay Rowdies	Mount Pleasant, SC
	Torres 5'; Markanich 37', 60'; Dossantos (yellow card) 43'; Segbers (yellow card) 59'	Report	Kleemann (yellow card) 8' (goal) 81'; Worth (yellow card) 61'; Pérez (yellow card) 79'; Guillen (yellow card) 90'+4'	Stadium: Patriots Point Soccer Complex; Attendance: 4,366; Referee: Abdou Ndiaye

October 5 31	Charleston Battery	2 - 2	Detroit City FC	Mount Pleasant, South Carolina
4:00 PM EDT	Torres (yellow card) 27' (goal) 84'; Markanich 73' (pen.); Molloy (yellow card) 82'	Report	Murphy (yellow card) 33'; Villanueva (yellow card) 36'; Carroll 49' (yellow card) 59'; Rutz (red card) 57'; Amoo-Mensah (yellow card) 72'; Rodriguez (yellow card) 90'; Kissiedou 90+3'	Stadium: Patriots Point Soccer Complex; Attendance: 4,610; Referee: Greg Dopka

October 12, 2024 32	Pittsburgh Riverhounds SC	2-0	Charleston Battery	Pittsburgh, Pennsylvania
	Kizza 2'; Mertz 20'; Osumanu (yellow card) 41'; Blackstock (yellow card) 79'	Report	Segbres (yellow card) 40'; Saydee (yellow card) 72'; Rodríguez (yellow card) 79'	Stadium: Highmark Stadium (Pennsylvania); Attendance: 5,025; Referee: Joe Surgan

October 19 33	Charleston Battery	1–1	Rhode Island FC	Mount Pleasant, SC
7:30PM	Smith (yellow card) 56'; Myers 71'; Crawford (yellow card) 90+5'	Report	Ybarra (yellow card) 16'; Fuson 45+2'; Holstad (yellow card) 49'	Stadium: Patriots Point Soccer Complex; Attendance: 3,480; Referee: Matthew Thompson

October 26, 2024 34	Charleston Battery	2-1	Loudoun United FC	Mount Pleasant, SC
	Smith (yellow card) 43'; Molloy (yellow card) 45'+2'; Torres 51'; Rodríguez 68'	Report	Awuah 61'; Erlandson (yellow card) 85'	Stadium: Patriots Point Soccer Complex; Attendance: 3,486; Referee: Brandon Stevis

===== Playoffs =====
November 2, 2024 East	Charleston Battery	v	Pittsburgh Riverhounds SC	Mount Pleasant, South Carolina
6:30 PM EDT				Stadium: Patriots Point Soccer Complex; Referee: Nabil Bensalah

=== U.S. Open Cup ===
During the 2024 U.S. Open Cup, the Charleston Battery entered in the Round of 32 alongside seven other USLC teams and the eight participating Major League Soccer franchises.

Unlike in the 2023 U.S. Open Cup, where the Battery made it to the Round of 32 before getting knocked out by Inter Miami CF, the Battery was able to advance past the Round of 32, beating fellow United Soccer League governed, third division side South Georgia Tormenta FC, a team in the USL League One, at home 3–2 after added extra time with the help of forward Matt Myers' hat trick. However, their run in the Open Cup came to an end during the Round of 16 when they hosted Major League Soccer club Atlanta United FC, where they would lose 4–5 on penalties after a scoreless match.

May 8 Round of 32	Charleston Battery (USLC) (South Carolina)	3–2 (a.e.t.)	(Georgia (U.S. state)) South Georgia Tormenta FC (USL1)	Mount Pleasant, South Carolina
19:00 EDT	Myers 21', 45+3', 120+1'; Allan (yellow card) 103'	Report	Fonseca 40' (yellow card) 60'; Rodriguez 83'	Stadium: Patriots Point Soccer Complex; Attendance: 998; Referee: Sergii Demianchuk

May 21 Round of 16	Charleston Battery (USLC) (South Carolina)	0–0 (4–5 p)	(Georgia (U.S. state)) Atlanta United FC (MLS)	Mount Pleasant, South Carolina
19:00 EDT	Segbres (yellow card) 74'	Report	Brennan (yellow card) 20'; Slisz (yellow card) 77'; Carleton (yellow card) 100'; Mosquera (yellow card) 102'	Stadium: Patriots Point Soccer Complex; Attendance: 5,000; Referee: Fabio Tovar
	Penalties
	Rodríguez (penalty scored); Conway (penalty scored); Myers (penalty scored); Smith (penalty scored); Gutierrez (penalty missed); Molloy (penalty missed)		(penalty missed) Lennon; (penalty scored) Ríos; (penalty scored) Slisz; (penalty scored) Hernández; (penalty scored) Firmino; (penalty scored) Gregersen
