= 2025 Charleston Battery season =

Season of a professional football team

Charleston Battery
2025 season
- President: Rob Salvatore
- Head coach: Ben Pirmann
- Stadium: Patriots Point Soccer Complex
- USL Championship: Eastern Conference: 2nd Overall: 2nd
- USL Playoffs: Conference Quarter-Finals
- U.S. Open Cup: Third Round
- USL Cup: Group Stage
- Top goalscorer: Cal Jennings (17)
- Highest home attendance: 5,080 (June 21, against Phoenix Rising FC)
- Lowest home attendance: 2,480 (March 15, against Rhode Island FC)
- Average home league attendance: 3,908
Home colors	Away colors

The 2025 Charleston Battery season was the club's 35th year of existence and the club's 22nd season in the second tier of the United States soccer league system. It is their fourteenth season in the USL Championship (USLC) as part of the Eastern Conference.

== Background ==
The Battery finished an impressive 2024 season with a 18-6-10 record. Finishing the regular season second place in the Eastern Conference, the Battery advanced to the USL Championship conference final where they were beaten by expansion club Rhode Island FC.

During the offseason, the USL Championship Golden Boot winner Nick Markanich, who set the USL Championship record for most goals scored in a season as a member of the Battery, left the club for Segunda División club CD Castellón in Spain.

== Season Squad ==
Squad No.	Name	Nationality	Position(s)	Date of birth (age)
Goalkeepers
1	Christian Garner	(United States)	GK	March 9, 2000 (age 25)
24	Daniel Kuzemka	(United States)	GK	September 23, 1998 (age 27)
56	Luis Zamudio	(United States)	GK	June 24, 1998 (age 27)
99	Enzo Mori	(United States)	GK	April 21, 2006 (age 19)
Defenders
2	Mark Segbers	(United States)	DF	April 18, 1996 (age 29)
5	Leland Archer	(Trinidad and Tobago)	DF	August 1, 1996 (age 29)
7	Langston Blackstock	(United States)	DF	March 23, 2000 (age 25)
16	Graham Smith	(United States)	DF	November 25, 1995 (age 30)
22	Joey Akpunonu	(United States)	DF	December 21, 2001 (age 24)
34	Michael Edwards	(United States)	DF	November 27, 2000 (age 25)
62	Nathan Dossantos	(Canada)	DF	December 26, 1999 (age 26)
Midfielders
4	Chris Allan	(England)	MF	September 27, 1998 (age 27)
6	Aaron Molloy	(Republic of Ireland)	MF	January 11, 1997 (age 29)
8	Emilio Ycaza	(United States)	MF	July 10, 1997 (age 28)
10	Arturo Rodríguez	(Mexico)	MF	December 15, 1998 (age 27)
11	Viggo Ortiz	(Mexico)	MF	May 26, 2008 (age 17)
19	Johnny Klein	(United States)	MF	November 7, 1999 (age 26)
80	Juan David Torres	(Colombia)	MF	March 31, 2001 (age 22)
91	Nanan Houssou	(Ivory Coast)	MF	December 28, 2000 (age 25)
Forwards
9	MD Myers	(United States)	FW	May 4, 2001 (age 24)
11	Rubio Rubin	(United States)	FW	March 1, 1996 (age 30)
26	Cal Jennings	(United States)	FW	May 17, 1997 (age 28)
36	Jackson Conway	(United States)	FW	March 12, 2001 (age 24)
42	Douglas Martínez	(United States)	FW	June 5, 1997 (age 28)

Last updated: 3 June 2025.

== Competitions ==
All times in Eastern Time Zone.

=== USL Championship ===
==== Eastern Conference ====
Pos	Team	Pld	W	L	T	GF	GA	GD	Pts	Qualification
1	Louisville City FC (S)	30	22	1	7	56	19	+37	73	Playoffs
2	Charleston Battery	30	19	6	5	62	32	+30	62	Playoffs
3	North Carolina FC	30	13	11	6	40	39	+1	45	Playoffs
4	Pittsburgh Riverhounds SC (C)	30	12	10	8	32	28	+4	44 (Note: Pittsburgh Riverhounds SC are ahead of Hartford Athletic on head-to-head points. PGH 6, HFD 0.)	Playoffs
5	Hartford Athletic	30	13	12	5	48	36	+12	44	Playoffs

Source: USL Championship Standings
Rules for classification: 1) head-to-head points; 2) head-to-head goal differential; 3) points-per-game within conference; 4) total wins; 5) total goal differential; 6) total goals scored; 7) points earned against top four Conference finishers; 8) disciplinary points; 9) coin toss or drawing of lots
(C) Champions; (S) Players' Shield winner

==== Matches ====
On December 19, 2024, the USL Championship released the regular season schedule for all 24 teams.

March 8 1	Charleston Battery	1–2	Louisville City FC	Mount Pleasant, SC
	Torres 63'; Rodriguez (red card) 70'	Report	Lopez 53'; Perez 76'	Stadium: Patriots Point Soccer Complex; Attendance: 3,438; Referee: Abdou Ndiaye

March 15 2	Charleston Battery	2–0	Louisville City FC	Mount Pleasant, SC
	Jennings 15', 37'	Report	Lopez 53'; Perez 76'	Stadium: Patriots Point Soccer Complex; Attendance: 2,480; Referee: Natalie Simon

March 29 3	North Carolina FC	2–1	Charleston Battery	Cary, NC
	Conway 24'; Smith 33' (o.g.)	Report	Jennings 45'+5' (pen.)	Stadium: WakeMed Soccer Park; Attendance: 2,480; Referee: Natalie Simon

April 5 4	Charleston Battery	2–1	Louisville City FC	Mount Pleasant, SC
	Jennings 45'+1' (pen.); Myers 73'	Report	Pacius 75'	Stadium: Patriots Point Soccer Complex; Attendance: 3,510; Referee: Joshua Encarnación

April 12 5	Charleston Battery	2–1	Pittsburgh Riverhounds SC	Mount Pleasant, SC
	Molloy 67'; Jennings 80'	Report	Sample 40'	Stadium: Patriots Point Soccer Complex; Attendance: 3,466; Referee: Elijio Arreguin

April 19 6	Indy Eleven	1–3	Charleston Battery	Indianapolis, IN
	Blake (yellow card) 28'; Rendón (yellow card) 43'; White (yellow card) 66'; Amoh 90+4'	Report	Myers 4', 8'; Rodríguez 49'; Zamudio (yellow card) 90+4'	Stadium: Carroll Stadium; Attendance: 10,080; Referee: Natalie Simon

May 3 7	Charleston Battery	4–2	Hartford Athletic	Mount Pleasant, SC
	Jennings 24' (pen.); Torres 38', 64'; Landry 56'	Report	Scarlett 5'; Ngalina 62' (pen.)	Stadium: Patriots Point Soccer Complex; Attendance: 4,288; Referee: Benjamin Meyer

May 10 8	Tampa Bay Rowdies	1–3	Charleston Battery	St. Petersburg, Florida
	Pacius 77'	Report	Jennings 7' (pen.); Myers 19', 28'	Stadium: Al Lang Stadium; Attendance: 5,273; Referee: Gerald Flores

May 17 9	Charleston Battery	4–0	San Antonio FC	Mount Pleasant, South Carolina
	Jennings 24' (pen.); Omar 30' (o.g.); Klein 90'	Report		Stadium: Patriots Point Soccer Complex; Attendance: 4,465; Referee: Brad Jensen

May 24 10	Detroit City FC	1–3	Charleston Battery	Hamtramck, MI
	Chapman 2' (yellow card) 87'; Gasso (yellow card) 32'; Amoo-Mensah (yellow card) 84'	Report	Jennings 5' 44'; Torres 52'; Landry (yellow card) 87'	Stadium: Keyworth Stadium; Referee: Elton García

June 7 11	Loudoun United FC	1–1	Charleston Battery	Leesburg, Virginia
	Nyeman 67'	Report	Myers 43'	Stadium: Segra Field; Attendance: 1,523; Referee: Nabil Bensalah

June 14 12	Hartford Athletic	1–2	Charleston Battery	Hartford, Connecticut
	Presthus 80'	Report	Myers 7'; Landry 50'	Stadium: Trinity Health Stadium; Attendance: 4,610; Referee: Matthew Corrigan

June 18 13	Miami FC	1–0	Charleston Battery	Miami, Florida
	Romero 51'	Report		Stadium: Pitbull Stadium; Attendance: 927; Referee: Luis Arroyo

June 21 14	Charleston Battery	4–1	Phoenix Rising FC	Mount Pleasant, South Carolina
	Myers 8'; Rodriguez 44', 77'; Landry 88'	Report	Avayevu 36'	Stadium: Patriots Point Soccer Complex; Attendance: 5,080; Referee: Luis Arroyo

July 2 15	Birmingham Legion FC	0–0	Charleston Battery	Birmingham, Alabama
		Report		Stadium: Protective Stadium; Attendance: 5,805; Referee: Matthew Thompson

July 6 16	Charleston Battery	1–0	North Carolina FC	Mount Pleasant, South Carolina
	Ycaza 40'	Report		Stadium: Patriots Point Soccer Complex; Attendance: 3,260; Referee: Alyssa Nichols

July 12 17	New Mexico United	1–2	Charleston Battery	Albuquerque, New Mexico
	Maples 63' (Pen.)	Report	Jabang 49' (o.g.); Rubín 68'	Stadium: Isotopes Park; Attendance: 11,072; Referee: Abdou Ndiaye

July 19 18	Charleston Battery	3–0	Miami FC	Mount Pleasant, South Carolina
	Akpunonu 19'; Ycaza 30'; Rodríguez 53'	Report		Stadium: Patriots Point Soccer Complex; Attendance: 4,284; Referee: Matthew Corrigan

August 9 19	Louisville City FC	4–1	Charleston Battery	Louisville, Kentucky
	Goodrum 3'; Wilson 16', 28'; Davila 45'+6' (pen.)	Report	Myers 52'	Stadium: Lynn Family Stadium; Attendance: 13,611; Referee: Elijio Arreguin

August 16 20	Pittsburgh Riverhounds SC	1–2	Charleston Battery	Pittsburgh, Pennsylvania
	Griffin 11'	Report	Rubín 45'+1'; Rodríguez 55'	Stadium: Highmark Stadium; Attendance: 6,115; Referee: Brandon Stevis

August 24 21	Charleston Battery	4–1	Loudoun United FC	Mt. Pleasant, South Carolina
5:00 PM	Kelly 15'; Jennings 18'; Rodriguez 53'; Myers 63'	Report	Dambrot 71'	Stadium: Patriots Point Soccer Complex; Attendance: 4,070; Referee: Elton García
Note: Match rescheduled from August 23 due to inclement weather.

August 30 22	Rhode Island FC	1−0	Charleston Battery	Pawtucket, Rhode Island
7:00 PM	Bacharach (yellow card) 34'; Williams (yellow card) 41' (goal) 69'; Holstad (yellow card) 66'	Report	Rubin (yellow card) 83'	Stadium: Centreville Bank Stadium; Attendance: 7,787; Referee: Edson Carvajal

September 6 23	Charleston Battery	2–1	Indy Eleven	Mount Pleasant, SC
7:30 PM	Jennings 38' (p), 67'; Myers (yellow card) 45+4'; Ycaza (yellow card) 57'	Report	McRobb (yellow card) 30'; Murphy (yellow card) 38'; Schaefer (yellow card) 65'; Foster (yellow card) 70'; Blake 72'	Stadium: Patriots Point Soccer Complex; Attendance: 5,012; Referee: Nabil Bensalah

September 13 24	Charleston Battery	3–3	Oakland Roots SC	Mount Pleasant, South Carolina
7:30 PM	Jennings 26'; Myers 46'; Rubin 74'	Report	Johnson 45'+6' (pen.); Wilson 52', 55'	Stadium: Patriots Point Soccer Complex; Attendance: 4,030; Referee: Mark Verso

September 20 25	El Paso Locomotive FC	0–2	Charleston Battery	El Paso, Texas
9:00 PM		Report	Jennings 5' (pen.); Myers 61'	Stadium: Southwest University Park; Attendance: 7,842; Referee: Servando Berna Rico

September 27 26	Orange County SC	2–2	Charleston Battery	Irvine, California
10:00 PM	Zubak 63', 76' (pen.)	Report	Myers 84' (pen.); Rubin 86'; Torres (red card) 90'+8'	Stadium: Championship Soccer Stadium; Attendance: 5,000; Referee: Natalie Simon

October 5 27	Sacramento Republic FC	v	Charleston Battery	Sacramento, California
		Report		Stadium: Heart Health Park
Note: Match rescheduled to October 22 due to Sacramento Republic hosting the USL Cup Final

October 13 28	Charleston Battery	5–0	Colorado Springs Switchbacks FC	Mt. Pleasant, South Carolina
5:00 PM	Molloy 7'; Myers 12'; Ycaza 25'; Dossantos 78'; Ortiz 83'	Report		Stadium: Patriots Point Soccer Complex; Attendance: 2,993; Referee: Trevor Wiseman
Note: Match was originally on October 11 due to inclement weather; When abandoned during halftime, Colorado Springs was leading 1–0

October 18 29	Charleston Battery	1−1	Detroit City FC	Mt. Pleasant, South Carolina
7:30 PM EDT	Myers 65'	Report	Diouf 66'	Stadium: Patriots Point Soccer Complex; Attendance: 4,020; Referee: Muhammad Kaleia

October 22 27	Sacramento Republic FC	1–0	Charleston Battery	Sacramento, California
7:00 PM	Bennett 50'	Report		Stadium: Heart Health Park; Attendance: 8,779; Referee: Cristian Campo Hernández
Note: Match rescheduled to October 22 due to Sacramento Republic hosting the USL Cup Final

October 25 30	Charleston Battery	2–1	Birmingham Legion FC	Mt. Pleasant, South Carolina
5:00 PM	Landry 34'; Jennings 55' (pen.)	Report	Tabortetaka 6'; Kavita (red card) 53'	Stadium: Patriots Point Soccer Complex; Attendance: 4,737; Referee: Drew Klemp

==== USL Championship playoffs ====
As the second seed in the Eastern Conference, the Charleston Battery clinched a home playoff spot in the 2025 USL Championship playoffs, matched up against the seventh seeded Rhode Island FC. Playing at home, the Battery played for a scoreless draw in regular and added extra time, before ultimately falling to Rhode Island FC for the second year in a row, losing 3−5 in a penalty shootout.

November 2, 2025 East	Charleston Battery	0−0 (a.e.t.) (3−5 p)	Rhode Island FC	Mt. Pleasant, South Carolina
2:00 PM ET	Archer (yellow card) 33'; Segbers (yellow card) 90+5'; Landry (red card) 90+6'	Report	Williams (yellow card) 24'; Kwizera (yellow card) 90+2' (yellow-red card) 90+6'; Fuson (yellow card) 105'; Bacharach (yellow card) 107'	Stadium: Patriots Point Soccer Complex; Attendance: 4,532; Referee: Elton Garcia
	Penalties
	Molloy (penalty scored); Rubín (penalty scored); Rodríguez (penalty missed); Myers (penalty scored)		(penalty scored) Williams; (penalty scored) Diop; (penalty scored) Rodriguez; (penalty scored) Bacharach; (penalty scored) Mabika

=== USL Cup ===
The Battery participated in the second edition of the USL Cup, the first edition to feature teams from both the USL Championship and League One.

==== Standings ====
Pos	Lg	Team	Pld	W	PKW	PKL	L	GF	GA	GD	Pts
2	USLC	Tampa Bay Rowdies	4	2	0	1	1	8	6	+2	7
3	USL1	South Georgia Tormenta FC	4	2	0	1	1	8	7	+1	7
4	USLC	Miami FC	4	1	1	0	2	7	9	−2	5
5	USLC	Charleston Battery	4	1	1	0	2	5	6	−1	5
6	USL1	FC Naples	4	1	0	0	3	4	7	−3	3

Updated to match(es) played on July 26, 2025. Source: USL

==== Matches ====
April 26, 2025	FC Naples	1–0	Charleston Battery	Naples, Florida
7:00 PM EDT	Henderlong 18'	Report		Stadium: Paradise Coast Sports Complex Stadium; Attendance: 4,172; Referee: Atahan Yaya

May 31, 2025	Charleston Battery	0–1	Greenville Triumph SC	Mount Pleasant, South Carolina
6:00 PM EDT		Report	Zakowski 44'	Stadium: Patriots Point Soccer Complex; Attendance: 3,701; Referee: Marie Durr

June 28, 2025	South Georgia Tormenta FC	3–3 (4–5 p)	Charleston Battery	Statesboro, Georgia
7:30 PM EDT	Cabral 44'; Vivas 83'; Reid-Stephen 90+4'	Report	Archer 8'; Jennings 58'; Ycaza 64'	Stadium: Optim Sports Medicine Field at Tormenta Stadium; Attendance: 876; Referee: Gerald Flores
	Penalties
	Nyandjo (penalty scored); Bwana (penalty scored); Walker (penalty scored); Jiménez (penalty scored); Alves (penalty missed)		(penalty scored) Conway; (penalty scored) Rodríguez; (penalty scored) Myers; (penalty scored) Ycaza; (penalty scored) Kelly

July 26, 2025	Charleston Battery	2–1	Tampa Bay Rowdies	Mount Pleasant, South Carolina
7:30 PM EDT	Castellanos 45+4' (o.g.); Myers 71'	Report	Skinner 90+1'	Stadium: Patriots Point Soccer Complex; Attendance: 3,599; Referee: Thomas Snyder

=== U.S. Open Cup ===
The Battery, as a member of the second division USL Championship, entered the U.S. Open Cup in the Third Round based on its performance in the 2024 USL Championship season. Drawn away against Division 3 USL League One club South Georgia Tormenta FC, they cruised to a 4–0 victory. Moving on to the Round of 32, the Battery would ultimately be eliminated in a 2–0 loss away against MLS club D.C. United after added extra time.

April 15	Charleston Battery (USLC) (South Carolina)	4–0	(Georgia (U.S. state)) South Georgia Tormenta FC (USL1)	Mount Pleasant, South Carolina
7:30 p.m. EDT	Allan 32'; Myers 45+1', 52', 70'	Report		Stadium: Ralph Lundy Field; Attendance: 1,419; Referee: John Rush

May 6, 2025	D.C. United (Washington, D.C.)	2–0 (a.e.t.)	(South Carolina) Charleston Battery	Washington, D.C.
7:00 p.m. EDT	Murrell 96'; Stroud 103'	Report		Stadium: Audi Field; Attendance: 6,781; Referee: Ricardo Montero
