= 2023 Charleston Battery season =

Season of a professional football team

Charleston Battery
2023 season
- Owner: Rob Salvatore
- Manager: Ben Pirmann
- Stadium: Patriots Point
- USL: Eastern Conf.: 3rd
- 2023 U.S. Open Cup: Round of 32
- USL Playoffs: USL Championship Final
- Top goalscorer: Augustine Williams (15 goals)
- Highest home attendance: 5,094 (Nov 12 vs. PHX)
- Lowest home attendance: 1,661 (April 8 vs. HFD)
- Average home league attendance: 3,112

The 2023 Charleston Battery season was Charleston Battery's 31st season of competition which marked its 30th anniversary. Charleston compete in the USL Championship, the second tier of professional soccer in the United States and the highest level in the USL.

The Battery enjoyed a successful bounce-back campaign in 2023, reaching the USL Championship Final after failing to make the postseason the year before.

== Background ==
The Battery ended their 2022 season in 12th, near the bottom of the Eastern Conference table. They also suffered a 0-1 loss to Tormenta FC, ending their U.S. Open Cup run in the second round.

One week prior to the end of the 2022 season, the club and head coach Conor Casey agreed to mutually part ways after posting a dismal 6W-22L-6D record, the worst in club history. On November 17, 2022 The Battery appointed reigning USL Championship Coach of the Year Ben Pirmann as head coach from Memphis 901 FC.

The Battery retained 10 players from the 2022 team going into the 2023 season, with 18 others initially departing into free agency.

== Season squad ==
Squad No.	Name	Nationality	Position(s)	Date of birth (age)
Goalkeepers
24	Daniel Kuzemka	(United States)	GK	September 23, 1998 (age 27)
25	Trey Muse	(United States)	GK	July 26, 1999 (age 26)
31	Danny Fischer	(United States)	GK	November 16, 2004 (age 21)
Defenders
2	Pierre Reedy	(United States)	FB	January 11, 1998 (age 28)
2	Mark Segbers	(United States)	FB	April 18, 1996 (age 30)
3	A.J. Cochran	(United States)	DF	February 9, 1993 (age 33)
5	Leland Archer	(Trinidad and Tobago)	DF	January 8, 1996 (age 30)
14	Derek Dodson	(United States)	DF	November 3, 1998 (age 27)
20	A.J. Paterson	(Grenada)	DF	January 31, 1996 (age 30)
23	Juan Palma	(Colombia)	DF	July 18, 1999 (age 26)
28	Deklan Wynne	(New Zealand)	DF	March 20, 1995 (age 31)
Midfielders
4	Chris Allan	(England)	MF	September 27, 1998 (age 27)
7	Andrew Booth	(Jamaica)	MF	July 16, 1997 (age 28)
8	Emilio Ycaza	(United States)	MF	July 10, 1997 (age 28)
10	Handwalla Bwana	(Somalia)	AM	June 25, 1999 (age 26)
10	Arturo Rodriguez	(United States)	MF	December 15, 1998 (age 27)
11	Fidel Barajas	(Mexico)	MF	April 5, 2006 (age 20)
15	Joseph Schmidt	(United States)	DM	November 2, 1998 (age 27)
19	Robbie Crawford	(Scotland)	MF	March 19, 1993 (age 33)
32	Charles Dennis	(United States)	MF	September 13, 2004 (age 21)
Forwards
9	Augustine Williams	(Sierra Leone)	FW	August 3, 1997 (age 28)
13	Nick Markanich	(United States)	FW	December 26, 1999 (age 26)
16	Matthias Dennis	(United States)	FW	October 15, 2006 (age 19)
17	Aidan Apodaca	(United States)	FW	May 24, 1996 (age 30)
21	Tristan Trager	(United States)	FW	August 28, 1999 (age 26)
22	Jesse Randall	(New Zealand)	FW	August 19, 2002 (age 23)
69	Roberto Avila	(United States)	FW	October 16, 2000 (age 25)

Last updated: 20 April 2023.
Source: Battery, USL Championship

== Transfers ==
=== In ===
Pos.	Player	Signed from	Details	Date	Ref.
MF	(United States) Emilio Ycaza	(United States) Rio Grande Valley FC Toros	Free Transfer	December 8, 2022	
DF	(United States) Derek Dodson	(United States) Memphis 901 FC	Free Transfer	December 15, 2022	
MF	(England) Chris Allan	(United States) Memphis 901 FC	Free Transfer	December 20, 2022	
DF	(Colombia) Juan Palma	(Colombia) Once Caldas	Free Transfer	December 27, 2022	
GK	(United States) Trey Muse	(United States) Loudoun United FC	Free Transfer	December 29, 2022	
DF	(New Zealand) Deklan Wynne	(United States) Detroit City FC	Free Transfer	January 3, 2023	
MF	(Kenya) Handwalla Bwana	(United States) Nashville SC	Free Transfer	January 11, 2023	
FW	(United States) Tristan Trager	(United States) Atlanta United 2	Undisclosed Fee	January 17, 2023	
DF	(United States) A. J. Cochran	(United States) Indy Eleven	Free Transfer	February 2, 2023	
GK	(United States) Danny Fischer	(United States) St. Louis Scott Gallagher SC	Academy contract	February 7, 2023	
FW	(United States) Nick Markanich	(United States) FC Cincinnati	Free transfer	February 16, 2023	
MF	(United States) Dante Polvara	(Scotland) Aberdeen F.C.	Loan	March 8, 2023	
MF	(United States) Charlie Dennis	(United States) Tormenta FC academy	Academy contract	March 21, 2023	
FW	(United States) Mattie Dennis	(United States) SC Surf	Academy contract	March 21, 2023	
FW	(New Zealand) Jesse Randall	(New Zealand) Wellington Olympic AFC	Free transfer	March 22, 2023	
MF	(Mexico) Arturo Rodríguez	(United States) Phoenix Rising FC	Free transfer	March 24, 2023	
FW	(United States) Beto Avila	(United States) Houston Dynamo FC	Loan	May 26, 2023	
MF	(United States) Pierre Reedy	(Scotland) Dundee F.C.	Free transfer	July 14, 2023	
DF	(United States) Mark Segbers	(United States) Miami FC	Undisclosed Fee	September 22, 2023	

=== Out ===
Date	Pos.	Player	To	Details	Ref.
November 22, 2022	GK	(United States) Joe Kuzminsky	(United States) Colorado Springs Switchbacks FC	Free Agency	
November 22, 2022	DF	(United States) Patrick Hogan	(United States) Pittsburgh Riverhounds SC	Free Agency	
November 22, 2022	DF	(United States) Matthew Sheldon	(United States) Hartford Athletic	Free Agency	
November 22, 2022	MF	(Liberia) DZ Harmon	(United States) Pittsburgh Riverhounds SC	Free Agency	
November 22, 2022	MF	(United States) Caden Theobald	Free Agent	Free Agency	
November 22, 2022	FW	(United States) Joel Bunting	(United States) Savannah Clovers FC	Free Agency	
November 22, 2022	FW	(United States) Alexander Dexter	Free Agent	Free Agency	
November 22, 2022	MF	(United States) Burke Fahling	(United States) Pittsburgh Riverhounds SC	Free Agency	
November 22, 2022	GK	(France) Hugo Fauroux	(United States) Loudoun United FC	Option declined	
November 22, 2022	DF	(United States) Brett St. Martin	Free Agent	Option declined	
November 22, 2022	FW	(Ghana) Dominic Oduro	Free Agent	Option declined	
November 22, 2022	MF	(Panama) Romario Piggott	Free Agent	Option declined	
November 22, 2022	MF	(Cuba) Geobel Pérez	Free Agent	Option declined	
November 22, 2022	DF	(United States) Preston Kilwien	(United States) Tormenta FC	Option declined	
November 22, 2022	FW	(Venezuela) Mauro Cichero	(United States) Forward Madison FC	Option declined	
November 22, 2022	MF	(Ghana) Enock Kwakwa	(United States) Northern Colorado Hailstorm FC	Option declined	
November 22, 2022	FW	(Jamaica) Nicque Daley	(Jamaica) Mount Pleasant F.A.	Option declined	
December 16, 2022	FW	(Saint Vincent and the Grenadines) Shak Adams	(United States) North Carolina FC	Undisclosed fee	
July 5, 2023	MF	(United States) Dante Polvara	(Scotland) Aberdeen F.C.	Recalled from loan	

== Competitions ==
=== Friendlies ===
February 5 Preseason	Charleston Battery	6–0	Coastal Carolina
		Report

February 11 Preseason	Charlotte FC	3–0	Charleston Battery	Charlotte, North Carolina
	Copetti 55'; Bender 68'; Santos 73'	Report		Stadium: Bank of America Stadium
Note: The match was moved to Charlotte from Charleston due to inclement weather in the original location.

February 18 Preseason	Charleston Battery	0–0	South Carolina
		Report

February 22 Preseason	Charleston Battery	3–0	College of Charleston
		Report

February 25 Preseason	North Carolina FC	2–1	Charleston Battery
		Report

March 4 Preseason	Charleston Battery	1–0	Tormenta FC
		Report

=== USL Championship ===
==== Eastern Conference ====
Pos	Team	Pld	W	L	T	GF	GA	GD	Pts	Qualification
1	Pittsburgh Riverhounds SC (S)	34	19	5	10	50	29	+21	67	Playoffs
2	Tampa Bay Rowdies	34	19	9	6	60	39	+21	63	Playoffs
3	Charleston Battery	34	17	9	8	47	43	+4	59	Playoffs
4	Memphis 901 FC	34	14	10	10	59	53	+6	52	Playoffs
5	Louisville City FC	34	14	12	8	41	44	−3	50	Playoffs

Source: USL Championship Standings
Rules for classification: 1) head-to-head points; 2) head-to-head goal differential; 3) points-per game within conference; 4) total wins; 5) total goal differential; 6) total goals scored; 7) points earned against top four Conference finishers; 8) disciplinary points; 9) coin toss or drawing of lots
(S) Players' Shield winner

==== Matches ====
March 11 1	Charleston Battery	1–1	Phoenix Rising	Mount Pleasant, South Carolina
	Booth 60'	Report	Trejo 74'	Stadium: Patriots Point; Attendance: 3,513; Referee: Thomas Snyder

March 18 2	Sacramento Republic FC	1–1	Charleston Battery	Sacramento, California
10:00 PM EDT	Jack Gurr 55'	Report	AJ Paterson 22'	Stadium: Heart Health Park; Attendance: 11,569; Referee: Brad Jensen

March 25 3	Charleston Battery	3–0	Tampa Bay Rowdies	Mount Pleasant, South Carolina
7:30 PM EDT	Barajas 3'; Williams 11' (pen.); Markanich 58'	Report		Stadium: Patriots Point; Attendance: 3,138; Referee: Sergii Demianchuk

April 8 4	Charleston Battery	3−2	Hartford Athletic	Mount Pleasant, South Carolina
	Dodson (yellow card) 9'; Markanich 35'; Williams 50'; Polvara (yellow card) 57' (yellow-red card) 76'; Rodriguez 90+4', (yellow card) 90+5'	Report	Hoppenot (yellow card) 4'; Saydee 13'; McGlynn 60'; Lapert (yellow card) 77'; Edwards (yellow card) 78'; Kaveh Rad (yellow card) 90+2'	Stadium: Patriots Point; Attendance: 1,661; Referee: Sergii Boiko

April 12 5	Tampa Bay Rowdies	1–2	Charleston Battery	St. Petersburg, Florida
		Report		Stadium: Al Lang Stadium; Attendance: 3,534

April 15 6	FC Tulsa	1–2	Charleston Battery	Tulsa, Oklahoma
6:00 PM EDT	Epps 14'	Report	Markanich 5'; Polvara 50'	Stadium: ONEOK Field; Attendance: 4,007; Referee: Elton García

April 22 7	Charleston Battery	0–0	Louisville City FC	Mount Pleasant, South Carolina
7:30 PM EDT	Williams (yellow card) 7' (yellow-red card) 90'; Allan (yellow card) 81'; Dodson (yellow card) 84'; Trager (yellow card) 86'	Report	Thellufsen (yellow card) 66'; Moguel (yellow card) 88'	Stadium: Patriots Point Soccer Complex; Referee: Calin Radosav; Assistant referees: Jeffrey Skinker; Marcus Moss; Fourth official: John Rush
Note: Kick off was delayed to 8:06 PM due to weather.

April 29 8	Charleston Battery	1–2	Colorado Springs Switchbacks FC	Mount Pleasant, South Carolina
		Report		Stadium: Patriots Point Soccer Complex

May 5 9	Las Vegas Lights FC	0–1	Charleston Battery	Las Vegas, Nevada
10:30 PM EDT		Report	Williams 59' (pen.)	Stadium: Cashman Field; Referee: Malik Badawi

May 13 10	Charleston Battery	0–7	San Antonio FC	Mount Pleasant, South Carolina
6:30 PM EDT	Booth (yellow card) 88'	Report	Adeniran 8'; Garcia 20', (yellow card) 34'; Oluwaseyi 26', 32', 53'; Hayes (yellow card) 45+2'; Batista (yellow card) 67'; Bailone 80', 89'	Stadium: Patriots Point Soccer Complex; Attendance: 3,053; Referee: Eric Tattersall

May 20 11	Charleston Battery	1–0	Monterey Bay FC	Mount Pleasant, South Carolina
5:00 PM EDT		Report		Stadium: Patriots Point Soccer Complex

May 27 12	Rio Grande Valley FC	0–2	Charleston Battery	Edinburg, Texas
7:00 PM EDT	Benítez (yellow card) 51'; Nodarse (yellow card) 78'; Torres (yellow card) 88'	Report	Williams 30', 64' (pen.) #69 (yellow card) 90+3'	Stadium: H-E-B Park; Attendance: 4,991; Referee: Matthew Corrigan

June 2 13	Charleston Battery	0–4	Indy Eleven	Mount Pleasant, South Carolina
		Report		Stadium: Patriots Point Soccer Complex

June 7 14	Charleston Battery	0–0	Detroit City FC	Mount Pleasant, South Carolina
10:30 PM EDT	Williams (yellow card) 33'	Report	Williams (yellow card) 15'; Bryant (yellow card) 78'; Fisher (yellow card) 60'	Stadium: Patriots Point Soccer Complex; Attendance: 2,196; Referee: John Matto

June 10 15	Pittsburgh Riverhounds SC	2–0	Charleston Battery	Pittsburgh, Pennsylvania
		Report		Stadium: Highmark Stadium; Attendance: 5,032

June 17 16	Hartford Athletic	3–4	Charleston Battery	Hartford, Connecticut
7:00 PM EDT	Lewis 31'; Hoppenot (yellow card) 34' (yellow-red card) 48'; McGlynn (yellow card) 36'; Edwards 45+3'; Edwards 57'; Rito (yellow card) 89'; Lapert (yellow card) 90+4'	Report	Markanich (yellow card) 10'; Markanich 43'; Allan (yellow card) 62'; Markanich 64'; Dodson 87'; Paterson 90'	Stadium: Trinity Health Stadium; Attendance: 4404; Referee: Alyssa Nichols

Jun 24 17	Memphis 901 FC	3–2	Charleston Battery	Memphis, TN
8:30 PM EDT		Report		Stadium: AutoZone Park; Attendance: 3,688; Referee: Gerald Flores

June 30 18	Charleston Battery	3–0	Loudoun United	Mount Pleasant, South Carolina
		Report		Stadium: Patriots Point Soccer Complex; Attendance: 3,359

July 12 19	Indy Eleven	1–1	Charleston Battery	Indianapolis, Indiana
		Report		Stadium: Carroll Stadium; Attendance: 9,059

July 15 20	Miami FC	1–1	Charleston Battery	Miami, Florida
7:00 PM EDT	Murphy (penalty missed) 5'; Mines 83'	Report	Dodson (yellow card) 30'; Pirmann (yellow card) 30'; Ycaza (yellow card) 69'; Crawford (yellow card) 80'; Rodríguez (yellow card) 84'; Booth 90+7'	Stadium: Riccardo Silva Stadium; Attendance: 1,308; Referee: Gabriele Giusti

July 22 21	Charleston Battery	3–1	Pittsburgh Riverhounds SC	Mount Pleasant, South Carolina
		Report		Stadium: Patriots Point Soccer Complex; Attendance: 3,703

July 29 22	Birmingham Legion	1–2	Charleston Battery	Birmingham, Alabama
6:30 PM EDT	Crognale (yellow card) 25'; Gabriel Alves (yellow card) 38'; Kasim 43'; Mensah (yellow card) 68'	Report	Markanich (yellow card) 18'; Palma (yellow card) 48'; Trager 82'; Dodson 90+1'	Stadium: Protective Stadium; Attendance: 5,212; Referee: Matt Thompson

August 4 23	Charleston Battery	0–1	Oakland Roots	Mount Pleasant, SC
4:30 PM EDT		Report	Dodson 41' (o.g.)	Stadium: Patriots Point Soccer Complex; Attendance: 2,487; Referee: John Griggs

August 9 24	Louisville City	1–1	Charleston Battery	Louisville, Kentucky
8:00 PM EDT	Lancaster 67'	Report	Palma (yellow card) 73'; Ycaza 80'	Stadium: Lynn Family Stadium; Attendance: 7,285; Referee: Brandon Stevis; Assistant referees: Nicholas Balcer; Eric Burton; Fourth official: Benjamin Meyer

August 12 25	Detroit City FC	0–1	Charleston Battery	Hamtramck, Michigan
7:30 PM EDT	Lewis (yellow card) 7'; Bryant (yellow card) 27'; Levis (yellow card) 81'	Report	Palma (yellow card) 40'; Williams 71'; Reedy (yellow card) 75'; Booth (yellow card) 90+5'	Stadium: Keyworth Stadium; Attendance: 7,022; Referee: Abdou Ndiaye

August 19 26	Orange County SC	2–0	Charleston Battery	Irvine, California
7:00 PM EDT	B. Iloski 45+1'; M. Iloski (yellow card) 48'; Scott (yellow card) 58'; Lambe 62'	Report	Wynne (yellow card) 26'; Palma (yellow card) 43'; Avila (yellow card) 45+2'; Dodson (yellow card) 60'	Stadium: Championship Soccer Stadium; Attendance: 5,500; Referee: Elijio Arreguin

Aug 26 27	Charleston Battery	1–0	Memphis 901 FC	Mt. Pleasant, SC
7:30 PM EDT		Report		Stadium: Patriots Point; Attendance: 4,004; Referee: Nabil Bensalah

September 2 28	New Mexico United	0–1	Charleston Battery	Albuquerque, New Mexico
10:00 PM EDT		Report	Williams 74'	Stadium: Isotopes Park; Attendance: 9,034; Referee: Alejo Calume

September 9 29	Charleston Battery	2–0	San Diego Loyal SC	Mount Pleasant, South Carolina
7:30 PM EDT	Trager 45+1', 47'; Ycaza (yellow card) 45+3'; Dodson (yellow card) 70'	Report	Stoneman (yellow card) 66'; Damus (yellow card) 71'; Guzmán (yellow card) 76'	Stadium: Patriots Point Soccer Complex; Attendance: 3,691; Referee: Gerald Flores

September 16 30	Loudoun United	2–2	Charleston Battery	Leesburg, VA
7:00 PM EDT		Report		Stadium: Segra Field; Attendance: 3,017; Referee: Alex Billeter

September 23 31	Charleston Battery	2–1	FC Tulsa	Charleston, South Carolina
7:30 PM EDT		Report		Stadium: Patriots Point Soccer Complex; Attendance: 2,945

September 30 32	El Paso Locomotive FC	3–2	Charleston Battery	El Paso, Texas
10:30 PM EDT	Petrović 33'; Sonupe 75'; Calvillo 84'	Report	Williams 38'; Ycaza 71'	Stadium: Southwest University Park; Attendance: 6,736; Referee: Joshua Encarnación

October 7 33	Charleston Battery	1–2	Miami FC	Mount Pleasant, South Carolina
6:00 PM EDT	Williams 7'; Barajas (yellow card) 38'; Allan (yellow card) 53'; Trager (yellow card) 86'	Report	Rivas 56' (pen.); Cabral (yellow card) 65'; Salazar 80', (yellow card) 85'	Stadium: Patriots Point Soccer Complex; Attendance: 4,463; Referee: DeShun Beard

October 14 34	Charleston Battery	1–0	Birmingham Legion	Mount Pleasant, South Carolina
4:00 PM EDT	Markanich 33'; Segbers (yellow card) 64'; Rodríguez (yellow card) 67'; Muse (yellow card) 86'	Report	Pasher (yellow card) 60'; Kavita (yellow card) 64'; Rufe (yellow card) 64'	Stadium: Patriots Point Soccer Complex; Attendance: 3,265; Referee: Austin Saini

=== USL Championship Playoffs ===
October 22 Conference Quarter-final	Charleston Battery	5–0	Indy Eleven	Mount Pleasant, South Carolina
4:00 PM EDT	Ycaza 12' (yellow card) 90'; Williams (yellow card) 16' (goal) 37'; Rodríguez 40'; Barajas 47'; Markanich 63'	Report	Boudadi (yellow card) 57'; Vázquez (yellow card) 72'; Diz Pe (yellow card) 76'; Lindley (yellow card) 83'	Stadium: Patriots Point Soccer Complex; Attendance: 2,972; Referee: Jeremy Scheer

October 28, 2023 Conference Semi-final	Charleston Battery	2–1	Birmingham Legion FC	Mount Pleasant, South Carolina
7:00 PM EDT	Ycaza 17'; Dodson 68'	Report	Kasim 41'; Agudelo (yellow card) 61'; Rufe (yellow card) 70'; Lopez (yellow card) 86'	Stadium: Patriots Point Soccer Complex; Attendance: 2,762; Referee: Elton Garcia

November 4 Conference Final	Charleston Battery	2–1	Louisville City FC	Mount Pleasant, South Carolina
7:30 PM EST	Rodríguez 5' (yellow card) 69'; Williams 58' (pen.); Allan (yellow card) 90+4'	Report	Ownby (yellow card) 4'; Moguel (yellow card) 83' (red card) 86'; Adams 90'; Cruz (yellow card) 90+1'	Stadium: Patriots Point Soccer Complex; Attendance: 4,438; Referee: Elvis Osmanovic

November 12, 2023 USL Championship Final	Charleston Battery	1–1 (a.e.t.) (2–3 p)	Phoenix Rising FC	Mount Pleasant, South Carolina
7:00 PM EST	Markanich 36'; Avila (yellow card) 72'	PHX Report; CHS Report	Traore (yellow card) 11'; Harvey (yellow card) 72'; Fuenmayor (yellow card) 73'; Cuello (yellow card) 80'; Stenberg 90'; Zambrano (yellow card) 115'; Guerra (yellow card) 117'	Stadium: Patriots Point Soccer Complex; Attendance: 5,094; Referee: Elton Garcia
	Penalties
	Paterson (penalty scored); Williams (penalty scored); Archer (penalty missed); Allan (penalty missed); Dodson (penalty missed)		(penalty missed) Cuello; (penalty missed) Krutzen; (penalty scored) Zambrano; (penalty scored) Gallardo; (penalty scored) Arteaga

=== U.S. Open Cup ===
Charleston Battery entered into the tournament in the 2nd Round.

April 4 Second Round	Charleston Battery (USLC) (South Carolina)	4–1	(Georgia (U.S. state)) Savannah Clovers FC (NISA)	Mount Pleasant, South Carolina
7:00 PM EDT	Crawford 37'; Williams 51'; Trager 63'; Markanich 77'	Report	Sanchez 76'	Stadium: Patriots Point; Attendance: 1,617; Referee: Amiel Aleman

April 25 Third Round	Charleston Battery (USLC) (South Carolina)	1–0 (a.e.t.)	(North Carolina) Charlotte Independence (USL1)	Mount Pleasant, South Carolina
7:00 PM EDT	Markanich 112'	Report		Stadium: Patriots Point Soccer Complex; Attendance: 1,151; Referee: Andrew Musashe

May 9 Round of 32	Inter Miami CF (MLS) (Florida)	1–0	(South Carolina) Charleston Battery (USLC)	Fort Lauderdale, Florida
7:00 PM EDT	Palma 48' (o.g.)	Report		Stadium: DRV PNK Stadium; Attendance: 2,726; Referee: Jonathan Bilinski
