= 2024 USL Championship playoffs =

Tournament details
- Country: United States
- Dates: November 1 – November 23
- Teams: 16

Final positions
- Champions: Colorado Springs Switchbacks FC
- Runners-up: Rhode Island FC

Tournament statistics
- Matches played: 15
- Goals scored: 36 (2.4 per match)
- Attendance: 105,314 (7,021 per match)
- Top goal scorer: (United States) JJ Williams (5 goals)
- All statistics correct as of November 23, 2024.

The 2024 USL Championship playoffs (branded as the 2024 USL Championship Playoffs presented by TERMINIX for sponsorship reasons) was the post-season championship of the 2024 USL Championship season. It is the fourteenth edition of the USL Championship playoffs. The playoffs began on the November 1, and concluded on November 23.

Phoenix Rising FC, the 2023 Western Conference champions, were the defending title holders, winning against the Eastern Conference champion Charleston Battery in a penalty shoot-out for their first title in the 2023 USL Championship playoffs. Louisville was the first team to clinch a playoff berth when they defeated Loudoun United FC on September 6. They went on to win the players shield on October 5 after drawing 2–2 with Indy Eleven.

In the 2024 USL Championship final, Colorado Springs Switchbacks won a first ever championship, defeating debutant team Rhode Island FC 3-0.

== Format ==
The top eight teams in each conference qualified for the playoffs which was in a single-elimination, fixed bracket format. All playoff matches were streamed live on ESPN+ and YouTube except the Championship final on CBS and TUDN. The playoffs began on the first weekend of November, with the final taking place on the 23rd.

== Conference standings ==
Eastern Conference

Pos	Team	Pld	Pts
1	Louisville City FC (S)	34	76
2	Charleston Battery	34	64
3	Detroit City FC	34	56
4	Indy Eleven	34	51
5	Rhode Island FC	34	51
6	Tampa Bay Rowdies	34	50
7	Pittsburgh Riverhounds SC	34	48
8	North Carolina FC	34	48
9	Birmingham Legion FC	34	45
10	Hartford Athletic	34	44
11	Loudoun United FC	34	42
12	Miami FC	34	11

Source: USL Championship Standings
(S) Players' Shield winner

Western Conference

Pos	Team	Pld	Pts
1	New Mexico United	34	59
2	Colorado Springs Switchbacks FC (C)	34	52
3	Memphis 901 FC	34	51
4	Las Vegas Lights FC	34	50
5	Sacramento Republic FC	34	49
6	Orange County SC	34	46
7	Oakland Roots SC	34	44
8	Phoenix Rising FC	34	42
9	San Antonio FC	34	39
10	FC Tulsa	34	38
11	Monterey Bay FC	34	34
12	El Paso Locomotive FC	34	32

Source: USL Championship Standings
(C) Champions

== Bracket ==
Conference Quarterfinals; November 1–3	Conference Semifinals; November 9–10
E1	Louisville City FC	3
E8	North Carolina FC	2
E1	Louisville City FC	0
E5	Rhode Island FC	3
E4	Indy Eleven	2
E5	Rhode Island FC	3
Eastern Conference
E3	Detroit City FC	1 (1)
E6	Tampa Bay Rowdies (p)	1 (3)
E6	Tampa Bay Rowdies	1
E2	Charleston Battery	2
E2	Charleston Battery	1
E7	Pittsburgh Riverhounds SC	0
W1	New Mexico United	2
W8	Phoenix Rising FC	1
W1	New Mexico United	0
W4	Las Vegas Lights FC	1
W4	Las Vegas Lights FC (p)	0 (3)
W5	Sacramento Republic FC	0 (2)
Western Conference
W3	Memphis 901 FC	0
W6	Orange County SC (a.e.t.)	1
W6	Orange County SC	1
W2	Colorado Springs Switchbacks FC (a.e.t.)	2
W2	Colorado Springs Switchbacks FC	2
W7	Oakland Roots SC	0

Conference Finals; November 16
E5	Rhode Island FC	2
E2	Charleston Battery	1
W4	Las Vegas Lights FC	0
W2	Colorado Springs Switchbacks FC	1

USL Championship Final; November 23
E5	Rhode Island FC	0
W2	Colorado Springs Switchbacks FC	3

== Schedule ==
=== Conference Quarterfinals ===
November 1, 2024 West	Las Vegas Lights FC	0–0 (a.e.t.) (3–2 p)	Sacramento Republic FC	Las Vegas, Nevada
7:30 PM PDT	Noël (yellow card) 38'	Report	Ross (yellow card) 86'	Stadium: Cashman Field; Attendance: 2,415; Referee: Elton Garcia
	Penalties
	Bennett (penalty missed); Ngando (penalty missed); Gannon (penalty scored); Doody (penalty scored); Noël (penalty scored)		(penalty missed) Portillo; (penalty missed) Viader; (penalty missed) Cicerone; (penalty scored) Ross; (penalty scored) Felipe

November 2, 2024 West	Memphis 901 FC	0–1 (a.e.t.)	Orange County SC	Memphis, Tennessee
1:00 PM CDT	Ward (yellow card) 5'; Paul (yellow card) 64'; Turci (yellow card) 68' (red card) 79'; Lapa (yellow card) 82'	Report	Lambe (yellow card) 52'; Casiple (yellow card) 58'; Nakkim (yellow card) 82'; Norris (yellow card) 112'; Powers 116'	Stadium: AutoZone Park; Attendance: 3,014; Referee: Ricardo Fierro

November 2, 2024 East	Charleston Battery	1–0	Pittsburgh Riverhounds SC	Mount Pleasant, South Carolina
6:30 PM EDT	Markanich 8'; Molloy (yellow card) 33'	Report	Hogan (yellow card) 53'	Stadium: Patriots Point Soccer Complex; Attendance: 4,287; Referee: Nabil Bensalah

November 2, 2024 East	Detroit City FC	1–1 (a.e.t.) (1–3 p)	Tampa Bay Rowdies	Hamtramck, Michigan
7:00 PM EDT	Rodriguez (yellow card) 19'; Moon 49' (o.g.); Kissiedou (yellow card) 52'; Amoo-Mensah (yellow card) 56'; Bryant (yellow card) 91'; Murphy (yellow card) 118'; Carroll (yellow card) 118'	Report	Jennings 19'; Bodily (yellow card) 41'; Niyongabire (yellow card) 78'; Doherty (yellow card) 116'	Stadium: Keyworth Stadium; Attendance: 7,183; Referee: Sergii Demianchuk
	Penalties
	Rodriguez (penalty missed); Murphy (penalty missed); Morris (penalty scored); Amoh (penalty missed)		(penalty missed) Arteaga; (penalty missed) Pérez; (penalty scored) Munjoma; (penalty scored) Murphy; (penalty scored) Doherty

November 2, 2024 East	Louisville City FC	3–2	North Carolina FC	Louisville, Kentucky
7:30 PM EDT	Dia 20'; Davila 24'; Perez 54'; Charpie (yellow card) 90+3'; Adams (yellow card) 90+4'	Report	Anderson 11'; Batista (yellow card) 59'; Washington 90+4'	Stadium: Lynn Family Stadium; Attendance: 8,875; Referee: Matthew Corrigan

November 2, 2024 West	Colorado Springs Switchbacks	2–0	Oakland Roots SC	Colorado Springs, Colorado
6:00 PM MDT	Henriquez 41'; Magee (yellow card) 49'; Damus 56' (pen.); Hanya (yellow card) 70'; Huerman (yellow card) 79'; Rocha (yellow card) 80'	Report	Margvelashvili (yellow card) 55'; Riley (yellow card) 64'; Diaz (yellow card) 90+5'; Njie (yellow card) 90+6'	Stadium: Weidner Field; Attendance: 7,463; Referee: Abdou Ndiaye

November 3, 2024 East	Indy Eleven	2–3	Rhode Island FC	Indianapolis, Indiana
1:00 PM EST	Quinn 35'; Martínez (yellow card) 45+2' (goal) 76'; Foster (yellow card) 58'; Musa (yellow card) 69'; Ofeimu (yellow card) 90+2'	Report	Williams 19' (pen.), 38', 52'; Herivaux (yellow card) 81'	Stadium: Michael A. Carroll Stadium; Attendance: 7,623; Referee: Joshua Encarnacion

November 3, 2024 West	New Mexico United	2–1	Phoenix Rising FC	Albuquerque, New Mexico
6:00 PM MST	Seymore 58'; Herbert (yellow card) 76'; Akale 85'	Report	Varela 49'; Fuenmayor (yellow card) 61'; Wyke (yellow card) 63'	Stadium: Rio Grande Credit Union Field at Isotopes Park; Attendance: 11,447; Referee: Lorenzo Hernandez

=== Conference Semifinals ===
November 9, 2024 East	Louisville City FC	0–3	Rhode Island FC	Louisville, Kentucky
7:30 PM EST		Report	Williams 9', 78'; Nodarse (yellow card) 11'; Holstad (yellow card) 72'; Dikwa 90+2'; Yao (yellow card) 90+7'	Stadium: Lynn Family Stadium; Attendance: 9,510; Referee: Elton Garcia

November 9, 2024 West	New Mexico United	0–1	Las Vegas Lights FC	Albuquerque, New Mexico
7:30 PM MST	Quill (yellow card) 40'; Akale (yellow card) 89'	Report	Hafferty (yellow card) 6'; Pinzón (yellow card) 54'; Bennett 86'; Gyau (yellow card) 87'	Stadium: Rio Grande Credit Union Field at Isotopes Park; Attendance: 10,049; Referee: Natalie Simon

November 10, 2024 East	Charleston Battery	2–1	Tampa Bay Rowdies	Mount Pleasant, South Carolina
1:00 PM EST	Torres (yellow card) 9'; Smith (yellow card) 29'; Segbers (yellow card) 45+4'; Chapman (yellow card) 48'; Markanich 50'; Molloy 83'	Report	Arteaga 30' (yellow card) 51'; Guillén (yellow card) 38'; Jennings (yellow card) 45+6'	Stadium: Patriots Point Soccer Complex; Attendance: 5,079; Referee: Matt Thompson

November 10, 2024 West	Colorado Springs Switchbacks	2–1 (a.e.t.)	Orange County SC	Colorado Springs, Colorado
4:30 PM MST	Zandi 10', 105+1' (yellow card) 69'	Report	Zubak 4'; Casiple (yellow card) 85'; Powers (yellow card) 108'	Stadium: Weidner Field; Attendance: 7,236; Referee: Lorenzo Hernandez

=== Conference Finals ===
November 16, 2024 East	Charleston Battery	1–2	Rhode Island FC	Mount Pleasant, South Carolina
5:00 PM (EST)	Markanich (yellow card) 52'; Torres 61'; Ycaza (yellow card) 90+3'	Report	Yao 43'; Herivaux (yellow card) 45+3'; Fuson 53'; Holstad (yellow card) 69'; Williams (yellow card) 76'; Doyle (yellow card) 89'; Dikwa (yellow card) 90+2'	Stadium: Patriots Point Soccer Complex; Attendance: 5,087; Referee: Calin Radosav

November 16, 2024 West	Colorado Springs Switchbacks	1–0	Las Vegas Lights FC	Colorado Springs, Colorado
7:00 PM (MST)	Tejada 38'; Henríquez (yellow card) 84'	Report	Howell (yellow card) 45'; Nigro (yellow card) 54'	Stadium: Weidner Field; Attendance: 8,023; Referee: Elton Garcia

=== USL Championship Final ===
November 23, 2024	Colorado Springs Switchbacks	3–0	Rhode Island FC	Colorado Springs, Colorado
10:00 AM (MST)	Mahoney (yellow card) 14'; Tejada 22'; Henríquez 42'; Damus 53'	Report		Stadium: Weidner Field; Attendance: 8,023; Referee: Ricardo Fierro

Championship Game MVP: (Panama) Juan Tejada (COS)

== Top goalscorers ==
Rank	Player	Club	Goals
1	(United States) JJ Williams	Rhode Island FC	5
2	(Haiti) Ronaldo Damus	Colorado Springs Switchbacks	2
2	(El Salvador) Jairo Henriquez	Colorado Springs Switchbacks	2
2	(United States) Nick Markanich	Charleston Battery	2
2	(Panama) Juan Tejada	Colorado Springs Switchbacks	2
2	(United States) Zach Zandi	Colorado Springs Switchbacks	2
7	(United States) Mukwelle Akale	New Mexico United	1
7	(Saint Vincent and the Grenadines) Oalex Anderson	North Carolina FC	1
7	(Venezuela) Manuel Arteaga	Tampa Bay Rowdies	1
7	(Jamaica) Khori Bennett	Las Vegas Lights FC	1
7	(United States) Taylor Davila	Louisville City FC	1
7	(United States) Amadou Dia	Louisville City FC	1
7	(Cameroon) Albert Dikwa	Rhode Island FC	1
7	(United States) Noah Fuson	Rhode Island FC	1
7	(United States) Cal Jennings	Tampa Bay Rowdies	1
7	(United States) Douglas Martínez	Indy Eleven	1
7	(Republic of Ireland) Aaron Molloy	Charleston Battery	1
7	(United States) Adrien Perez	Louisville City FC	1
7	(United States) Dillon Powers	Orange County SC	1
7	(United States) Aodhan Quinn	Indy Eleven	1
7	(United States) Will Seymore	New Mexico United	1
7	(Colombia) Juan David Torres	Charleston Battery	1
7	(Argentina) Fede Varela	Phoenix Rising FC	1
7	(United States) Bryce Washington	North Carolina FC	1
7	(Canada) Karifa Yao	Rhode Island FC	1
7	(United States) Ethan Zubak	Orange County SC	1
