= Nathan Dossantos =

Canadian soccer player (born 1999)

Personal information
- Full name: Nathan José Kitchell Dossantos
- Date of birth: April 11, 1999 (age 27)
- Place of birth: Oakville, Ontario, Canada
- Height: 5 ft 11 in (1.80 m)
- Position: Centre-back

Team information
- Current team: Tampa Bay Rowdies
- Number: 62

Youth career
- Oakville SC
- Dixie SC
- 2014: Toronto FC
- 2015–2016: Woodbridge Strikers
- 2017–2018: Sigma FC

College career
Years	Team	Apps	(Gls)
2018–2019	Duquesne Dukes	33	(1)
2020–2021	Marshall Thundering Herd	36	(1)

Senior career*
Years	Team	Apps	(Gls)
2016	Woodbridge Strikers	2	(0)
2017	Sigma FC	5	(0)
2019	Seattle Sounders U23	10	(0)
2021	FC Florida U23	2	(0)
2022–2023	Pittsburgh Riverhounds SC	50	(0)
2024–2025	Charleston Battery	60	(3)
2026–	Tampa Bay Rowdies	29	(0)
- * Club domestic league appearances and goals as of 18:00, 8 November 2026 (UTC)

Nathan José Kitchell Dossantos (born April 11, 1999) is a Canadian professional soccer player who plays as a defender for USL Championship club Tampa Bay Rowdies.

== Early life ==
Dossantos began playing youth soccer at age six with Oakville SC. He later played with Dixie SC, followed by youth stints with the Toronto FC Academy, Woodbridge Strikers and Sigma FC.

== College career ==
In 2018, Dossantos began attending Duquesne University, where he played for the men's soccer team. He made his collegiate debut on August 24, 2018, against the Marshall Thundering Herd. On October 13, 2018, he scored his first collegiate goal in a victory over the George Mason Patriots.

Ahead of the 2020 season, Dossantos transferred to Marshall University to play for the men's soccer team. He scored his first goal for Marshall on March 13, 2021, scoring the overtime winner against the FIU Panthers. In his first season with Marshall (played in the 2021 Spring due to the COVID-19 pandemic), he helped them with the national title and was named the Conference USA Defensive Player of the Week three times, and was named an All-Conference USA First Team All-Star, All-Southeast Region Second-Team, Scholar All-Region, Scholar All-American Second Team, Conference USA Commissioner's Honor Roll, NCAA All-Tournament Team, and TopDrawer Soccer Best XI Teams Third Team Defense. Ahead of his senior season, he was named the Conference USA Preseason Defensive Player of the Year. At the end of the season, he was named the Conference USA Defensive MVP and was named to the All-Conference First Team and the All-Southeast Region First Team.

== Club career ==
In 2016, he played with the Woodbridge Strikers in League1 Ontario. In 2017, he played with Sigma FC.

In 2019, he played with the Seattle Sounders U23 in USL League Two. In 2021, he played with FC Florida U23.

At the 2022 MLS SuperDraft, Dossantos was selected in the second round (46th overall) by Orlando City.

In February 2022, he signed with USL Championship club Pittsburgh Riverhounds SC on a one-year contract with a club option for 2023. He made his debut on March 12, 2022, as a substitute in 3–0 win over Memphis 901. In May 2022, he was named to the USL Championship Team of the Week for the first time for Week 9. He made 22 appearances for the club in 2022, before suffering a knee injury in August that kept him out for the remainder of the season. At the end of the season, the Riverhounds exercised their option for the 2023 season.

In January 2024, Dossantos signed with USL Championship club Charleston Battery. Dossantos was released by Charleston following their 2025 season.

On December 22, 2025, Dossantos signed with Tampa Bay Rowdies.

== International career ==
Dossantos was born to a Portuguese father and a mother from Hong Kong. In March 2014, he made his debut in the Canadian national program, attending a camp with the Canada U15 team.

== Career statistics ==
As of 30 October 2026

Club	Season	League			Playoffs		National Cup (Note: Appearances in U.S. Open Cup)		Other		Total	
Club	Season	Division	Apps	Goals	Apps	Goals	Apps	Goals	Apps	Goals	Apps	Goals
Woodbridge Strikers	2016	League1 Ontario	2	0	—		—		0	0	2	0
Sigma FC	2017	League1 Ontario	5	0	—		—		0	0	5	0
Seattle Sounders U23	2019	USL League Two	10	0	—		—		—		10	0
FC Florida U23	2021	USL League Two	2	0	—		—		—		2	0
Pittsburgh Riverhounds	2022	USL Championship	22	0	0	0	2	0	—		24	0
Pittsburgh Riverhounds	2023	USL Championship	28	0	1 (Note: Appearance(s) in USLC playoffs)	0	3	0	—		32	0
Pittsburgh Riverhounds	Total		50	0	1	0	5	0	0	0	56	0
Charleston Battery	2024	USL Championship	33	2	3	0	2	0	0	0	38	2
Charleston Battery	2025	USL Championship	27	1	0	0	2	0	4 (Note: Appearance(s) in USL Cup)	0	33	1
Charleston Battery	Total		60	3	3	0	4	0	4	0	71	3
Tampa Bay Rowdies	2026	USL Championship	30	0	1	0	0	0	5	0	36	0
Career total			159	3	5	0	9	0	9	0	182	3

== Honours ==
Marshall Thundering Herd

- Conference USA regular season: 2020
- NCAA National Championship: 2020

Individual

- Conference USA Defensive Player of the Year: 2021
