= Juan Palma =

Colombian footballer (born 1999)

Personal information
- Full name: Juan Sebastián Palma Micolta
- Date of birth: 18 July 1999 (age 27)
- Place of birth: Puerto Carreño, Colombia
- Height: 1.89 m (6 ft 2 in)
- Position: Defender

Team information
- Current team: Boyacá Chicó
- Number: 25

Senior career*
Years	Team	Apps	(Gls)
2018–2022	Once Caldas	22	(0)
2023–2024	Charleston Battery	28	(1)
2025–	Westchester SC	19	(0)
2026–	Boyacá Chicó	0	(0)

International career^{‡}
2018–2019	Colombia U20	5	(1)
- * Club domestic league appearances and goals as of 13:21, 2 November 2025 (UTC) ‡ National team caps and goals as of 18:44, 10 February 2021 (UTC)

Juan Sebastián Palma Micolta (born 18 July 1999) is a Colombian footballer who currently plays as a defender for Liga DIMAYOR club in Boyacá Chicó.

== Career ==
=== Charleston Battery ===
Palma was signed by the Battery on 27 December 2022. Palma's first season in Charleston developed into a highly successful one as the Colombian continued to improve as the year went on. The center-back turned into a regular starter in the Battery's run to the USL Championship Final, forming a formidable partnership with Leland Archer in the center of the defense.

In his first season in the United States, Palma recorded 95 clearances, 14 blocks, 27 interceptions, 87 duels won and one goal across 25 matches in league play (regular season and playoffs). He additionally featured in the Battery's three 2023 U.S. Open Cup matches. Palma was honored with a selection to the Week 20 USLC Team of the Week.

In May 2025, Palma joined USL League One side Westchester SC.

On 10 January 2026, Palma moved back to his home country and signed for Boyacá Chicó.

== Career statistics ==
=== Club ===
As of 10 February 2021.

Club	Season	League			Cup		Other		Total	
Club	Season	Division	Apps	Goals	Apps	Goals	Apps	Goals	Apps	Goals
Once Caldas	2018	Categoría Primera A	5	0	0	0	0	0	5	0
Once Caldas	2019	Categoría Primera A	1	0	0	0	0	0	1	0
Once Caldas	2020	Categoría Primera A	0	0	0	0	0	0	0	0
Once Caldas	2021	Categoría Primera A	0	0	0	0	0	0	0	0
Career total			6	0	0	0	0	0	6	0

== Honours ==
Charleston Battery

- Eastern Conference Champion (Playoffs): 2023

Colombia U-21

- Central American and Caribbean Games: 2018
