= Joe Schmidt (soccer) =

American soccer player

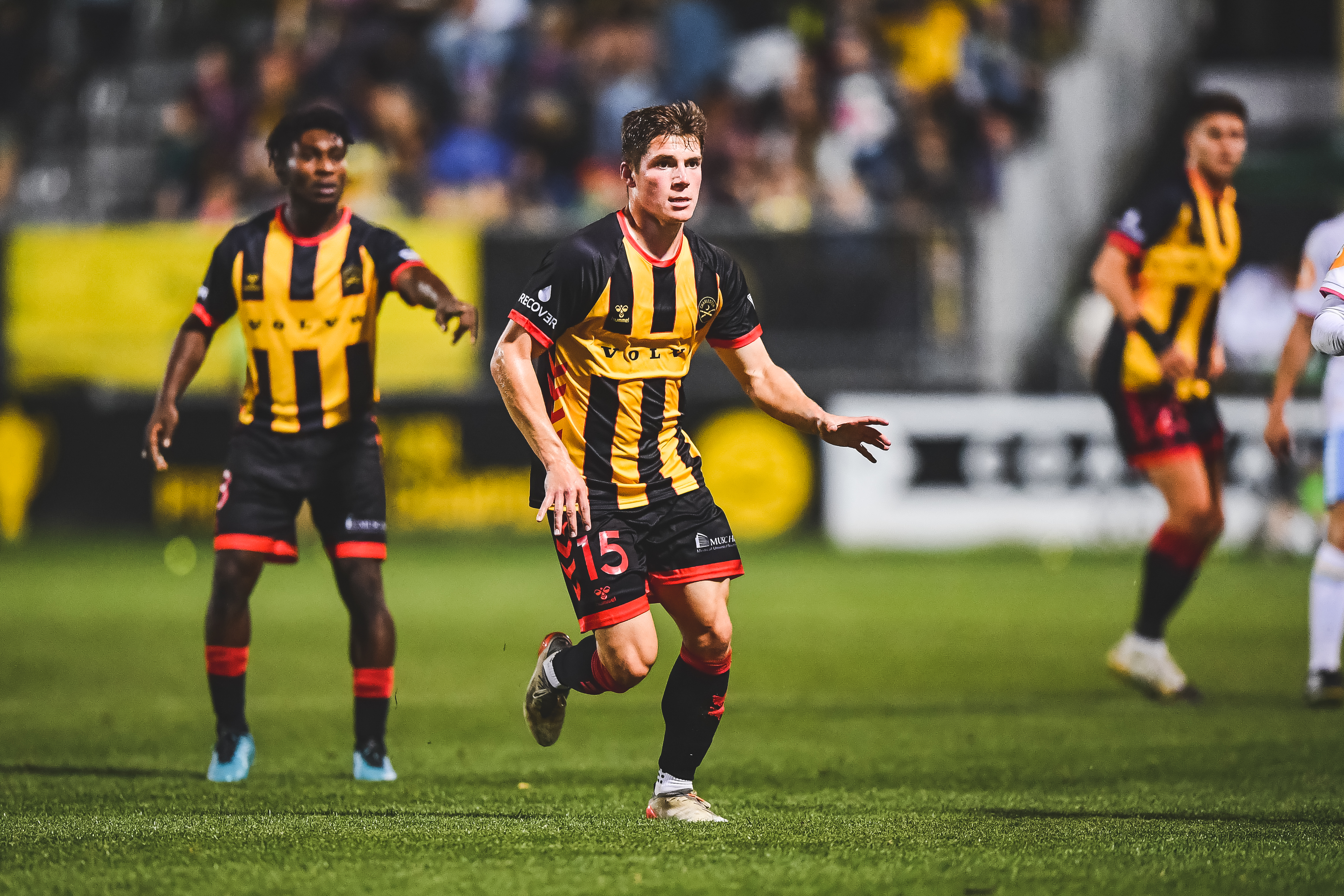
- Schmidt with Charleston in 2022

Personal information
- Full name: Joseph Schmidt
- Date of birth: November 2, 1998 (age 28)
- Place of birth: Bainbridge Township, Ohio, United States
- Height: 5 ft 9 in (1.75 m)
- Position: Defensive midfielder

Youth career
- 2011–2017: Cleveland Internationals

College career
Years	Team	Apps	(Gls)
2017–2021	Indiana Hoosiers	73	(3)

Senior career*
Years	Team	Apps	(Gls)
2018	Cleveland SC	0	(0)
2022–2023	Charleston Battery	29	(0)
2024	Hartford Athletic	3	(0)
2024	→ Spokane Velocity (loan)	5	(0)
Total		37	(0)
- * Club domestic league appearances and goals

Joseph Schmidt (born November 2, 1998) is an American former soccer player who played as a defensive midfielder.

== Playing career ==
=== Youth, college and amateur ===
Schmidt attended high school at University School, also playing four seasons of club soccer with Cleveland Internationals, captaining the U16 and U18 teams. He was also a member of the United States under-14 and under-15 youth national teams. In 2011, he briefly trained in the A.C. Milan Youth Sector.

In 2017, Schmidt attended Indiana University Bloomington to play college soccer. He redshirted his freshman season in 2017 before going on to make 73 appearances for the Hoosiers, scoring three goals and tallying nine assists from the defensive midfield role. He helped Indiana make runs to the College Cup in 2018 and 2020, ending the latter as national runner-up after advancing to the national championship game. He captained the Hoosiers during his senior year.

While in college, Schmidt was on the roster of National Premier Soccer League side Cleveland SC during their 2018 season, but did not appear due to injury.

=== Professional ===
On February 24, 2022, Schmidt signed with USL Championship club Charleston Battery. He made his professional debut on March 12, appearing as a 70th-minute substitute in a 1–0 victory over FC Tulsa. He left Charleston following the 2023 season.

Schmidt joined Hartford Athletic on December 5, 2023. On August 3, 2024, he joined Spokane Velocity on a short-term loan. He left Hartford following their 2024 season.

== Career statistics ==
As of July 30, 2022

Appearances and goals by club, season and competition
Club	Season	League			Cup (Note: Appearance in the U.S. Open Cup)		Continental		Other		Total	
Club	Season	Division	Apps	Goals	Apps	Goals	Apps	Goals	Apps	Goals	Apps	Goals
Cleveland SC	2018	NPSL	0	0	—		—		0	0	0	0
Charleston Battery	2022	USL Championship	20	0	1	0	—		—		21	0
Charleston Battery	2023	USL Championship	0	0	0	0	—		0	0	0	0
Charleston Battery	Total		20	0	1	0	0	0	0	0	21	0
Career total			20	0	1	0	0	0	0	0	21	0
