= Nick Markanich =

American soccer player (born 1999)

Personal information
- Full name: Nicholas Bungal Markanich
- Date of birth: December 26, 1999 (age 26)
- Place of birth: Bourbonnais, Illinois, United States
- Height: 6 ft 2 in (1.88 m)
- Position: Forward

Team information
- Current team: Houston Dynamo (on loan from Castellón)
- Number: 17

Youth career
- Chicago Fire

College career
Years	Team	Apps	(Gls)
2018–2021	Northern Illinois Huskies	69	(39)

Senior career*
Years	Team	Apps	(Gls)
2019–2021	Green Bay Voyageurs	15	(5)
2022	FC Cincinnati	9	(0)
2022	FC Cincinnati 2	15	(4)
2023–2024	Charleston Battery	62	(37)
2025–	Castellón	24	(2)
2026–	→ Houston Dynamo (loan)	6	(0)
2026–	→ Houston Dynamo 2 (loan)	2	(0)
- * Club domestic league appearances and goals as of 4 September 2026

Nicholas Bungal "Nick" Markanich (born December 26, 1999), is an American professional soccer player who plays as a forward for Major League Soccer club Houston Dynamo, on loan from Segunda División club CD Castellón.

== Early life ==
Markanich was born on December 26, 1999. He grew up in Bourbonnais, Illinois and attended Bradley-Bourbonnais Community High School. He played as part of the Chicago Fire for a period.

In 2018, he matriculated to Northern Illinois University, where he played for the Huskies soccer team. Over his four years at NIU, he started in 68 of his 69 appearances and scored 39 goals.

While at college, Markanich played with USL League Two side Green Bay Voyageurs between 2019 and 2021, without the 2020 season been cancelled due to the COVID-19 pandemic. He made a total of 15 appearances, scoring five goals and tallying three assists.

== Career ==
=== FC Cincinnati ===
Markanich was selected by FC Cincinnati in the 2022 MLS SuperDraft. He was chosen as the 2nd pick in the 2nd round of the draft, or the 30th overall pick. He was signed to a contract for the 2022 season (with options through the 2025 season) on February 21, 2022. He started in FC Cincinnati's first match of the season on February 26. Markanich was released by Cincinnati following their 2022 season.

=== Charleston Battery ===
On February 16, 2023, Markanich signed with USL Championship side Charleston Battery following a successful trial.

Markanich was among the USL Championship's top attackers in 2023. He was a five-time Team of the Week selection, the Week 15 Player of the Week and a Player of the Month nominee in June. Nick tallied 13 goals and four assists in 36 matches across all competitions, finding the back of the net in the regular season, playoffs and Lamar Hunt U.S. Open Cup.

Among Nick's most memorable goals included match-winners in the Open Cup Third Round against Charlotte Independence and in the regular season finale against Birmingham Legion FC, and his first-time strike in the USL Championship Final. He additionally scored braces on the road against Hartford Athletic and at home against Loudoun United. Markanich scored twice during the 2023 USL Championship Playoffs, including in the league final.

Markanich got off to a fast start and was the Championship's top scorer after the first months of play, scoring 11 goals in nine matches. This included a four-goal performance on April 27 against Las Vegas Lights FC, in which he scored a hat trick in the first half, the first of his professional career. His four goals and one assist performance was only the second on record in the USL Championship era, and the first Battery player with a four-goal game in Championship.

At the end of April, he was the top goalscorer of all the American domestic leagues, two goals ahead of Lionel Messi's nine with Inter Miami CF. Markanich was a nine-time Team of the Week selection and four-time Player of the Week (Week 6, 8, 18 and 25) winner through late-August. After scoring 15 goals in 18 games, Markanich became the fifth-fastest to reach 15 goals in a season in USL Championship history. Markanich scored his second hat trick of the season on August 24 against Orange County SC, bringing his total to 24 goals and one shy of the league's single-season record.

Markanich and teammate MD Myers formed a formidable striker partnership for the Battery, earning them the nickname "M&M Boys", as they led the USLC in combined goals and goal contributions (goals + assists) through late August.

On September 7, Markanich scored his 25th goal of the year to tie the Championship's single-season record.

On September 21, Markanich broke the USL Championship single-season scoring record with his 26th and 27th goals of the season on the same night against the Tampa Bay Rowdies. Markanich also tied the Battery's all-time single-season scoring record by matching Paul Conway's mark of 27 scored in 2001 (all competitions).

Markanich broke Conway's record in the next game, converting from the penalty spot on October 5 against Detroit City FC.

Markanich was crowned winner of the USL Championship Golden Boot with 28 goals scored in the regular season. Markanich also ended the year as the top goalscorer across all domestic leagues in the United States, ahead of the likes of Christian Benteke, Lionel Messi and Luis Suárez in MLS. He scored two more goals in the USL Championship Playoffs as the Battery reached the Eastern Conference Final for a second consecutive year. His 30 goals set the club's new single-season scoring record.

After the season, Markanich won USL Championship Player of the Year and garnered All-League First Team honors. Markanich was a near-unanimous pick for Player of the Year and was the first Battery player to win the award since Lamar Neagle in 2010.

=== Castellón ===
On August 30, 2024, Markanich agreed to a contract with Spanish Segunda División side CD Castellón, effective as of January 1.

==== Loan to Houston Dynamo ====
On January 20, 2026, Markanich returned to the United States after agreeing to a one-year loan deal with Houston Dynamo of the Major League Soccer.

== International career ==
=== Philippines ===
In 2024, Markanich was reportedly among the diaspora players being recruited by head coach Tom Saintfiet and team manager Freddy Gonzalez to play for the Philippines.

== Personal life ==
Markanich has a twin brother, Anthony Markanich, who also plays soccer. Anthony was drafted by the Colorado Rapids in the 2022 MLS SuperDraft.

== Honors ==
Charleston Battery

- Eastern Conference Champion (Playoffs): 2023

Individual

- USL Championship Player of the Year: 2024
- USL Championship Golden Boot: 2024
- USL Championship All-League First Team: 2024

Records

- Most goals scored in a USL Championship regular season: 28 (2024)
- Most goals scored in a Charleston Battery season (all competitions): 30 (2024)
