= Chris Allan =

English footballer (born 1998)

Personal information
- Full name: Christopher Mark Allan
- Date of birth: 27 September 1998 (age 28)
- Place of birth: South Shields, England
- Position: Midfielder

Team information
- Current team: Charleston Battery
- Number: 4

Youth career
- 2015–2018: Sunderland

College career
Years	Team	Apps	(Gls)
2019	Charleston Golden Eagles	17	(3)

Senior career*
Years	Team	Apps	(Gls)
2019	Asheville City	9	(2)
2021	Atlanta United 2	18	(1)
2022	Memphis 901	30	(1)
2023–	Charleston Battery	96	(1)
- * Club domestic league appearances and goals as of 12:14, 4 November 2026 (UTC)~

Christopher Mark Allan (born 27 September 1998) is an English footballer who plays as a midfielder for Charleston Battery in the USL Championship.

== Career ==
=== Youth, college and amateur ===
Allan spent time with the Sunderland academy, before moving to the United States to play college soccer at the University of Charleston in 2019. He made 17 appearances, scoring 3 goals and tallying 3 assists for the Golden Eagles during their 2019 season.

In 2019, Allan also appeared for NPSL side Asheville City.

=== Professional ===
On 2 April 2021, Allan signed with USL Championship side Atlanta United 2. He made his debut on 24 April 2021, starting against Louisville City. Atlanta declined his contract option following the 2021 season.

Allan joined Memphis 901 FC on 21 January 2022. He made his debut against Pittsburgh Riverhounds on 13 March 2022. He scored his first goal for the club against Tampa Bay Rowdies on 28 April 2022.

On 20 December 2022, it was announced that Allan would join Charleston Battery for their 2023 season in the USL Championship on a multi-year contract.

== Honors ==
Charleston Battery

- Eastern Conference Champion (Playoffs): 2023
