= Daniel Kuzemka =

American soccer player (born 1998)

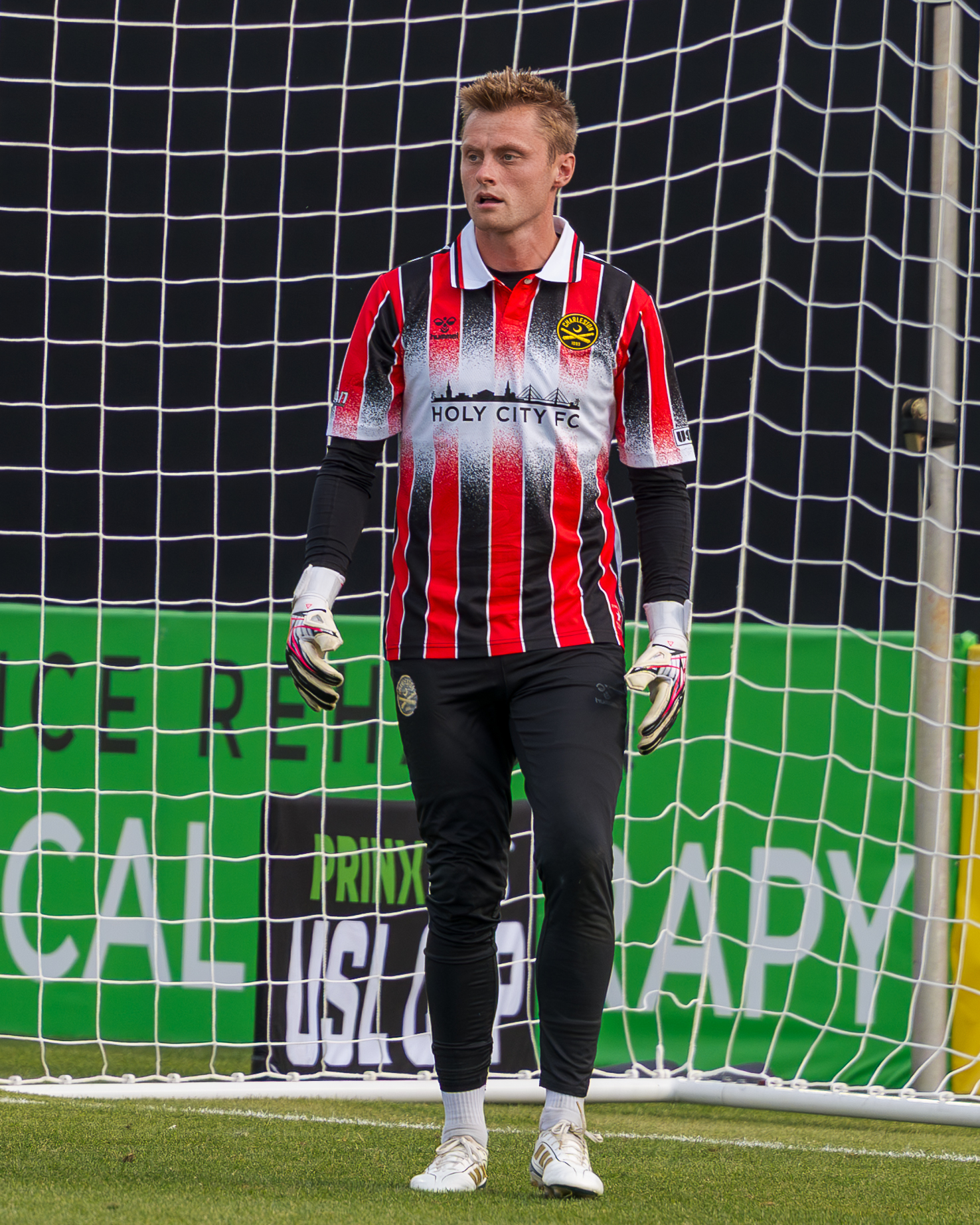
- Kuzemka with the Charleston Battery in 2026

Personal information
- Full name: Daniel Beau Kuzemka
- Date of birth: September 23, 1998 (age 28)
- Place of birth: Clifton, Virginia, United States
- Height: 6 ft 1 in (1.85 m)
- Position: Goalkeeper

Team information
- Current team: Charleston Battery
- Number: 24

Youth career
- 2015–2017: Bethesda-Olney

College career
Years	Team	Apps	(Gls)
2017–2019	Clemson Tigers	5	(0)
2020–2021	Charlotte 49ers	23	(0)

Senior career*
Years	Team	Apps	(Gls)
2022–	Charleston Battery	10	(0)
- * Club domestic league appearances and goals as of November 4, 2026

Daniel Beau Kuzemka (born September 23, 1998) is an American soccer player who currently plays for USL Championship side Charleston Battery.

== Playing career ==
=== Youth and college ===
Kuzemka attended high school at Centreville High School, where he was the number one ranked goalkeeper in the Mid-Atlantic Region. He also played club soccer for USSDA side Bethesda-Olney.

In 2017, Kuzemka attended Clemson University to play college soccer. In three seasons with the Tigers, Kuzemka made five appearances, missing the 2018 season due to injury. He transferred to the University of North Carolina at Charlotte in 2020, going on to make 23 appearances for the 49ers and was named Conference USA All-Academic Team in his senior year.

=== Professional ===
On April 14, 2022, Kuzemka signed with USL Championship side Charleston Battery. He made his professional debut on June 4, 2022, starting in a 3–4 loss to Indy Eleven. He recorded his first professional clean sheet on August 31, 2022, during a 0–0 draw with Pittsburgh Riverhounds. Following the 2022 season, Kuzemka entered free agency. He re-signed with the club a few weeks later.

== Honors ==
Charleston Battery

- Eastern Conference Champion (Playoffs): 2023
