= Arturo Rodríguez (footballer, born 1998) =

Mexican footballer (born 1998)

Personal information
- Date of birth: 15 December 1998 (age 27)
- Place of birth: San Luis Potosí, Mexico
- Height: 1.73 m (5 ft 8 in)
- Position: Midfielder

Team information
- Current team: Sacramento Republic FC
- Number: 10

Youth career
- 2017–2019: FC Dallas

Senior career*
Years	Team	Apps	(Gls)
2019–2020	North Texas SC	37	(10)
2020	→ Real Monarchs (loan)	2	(0)
2021–2022	Phoenix Rising	52	(5)
2023–2025	Charleston Battery	76	(11)
2026–	Sacramento Republic	20	(1)
- * Club domestic league appearances and goals as of November 11, 2026

Arturo Rodríguez (born 15 December 1998) is a Mexican professional footballer who plays as a midfielder for USL Championship club Sacramento Republic FC.

== Career ==
=== Youth ===
Rodriguez started his youth career with FC Dallas. However, his road through the academy system was not cut and dried. Rodriguez was actually rejected the first time he tried to join the FC Dallas academy. After this rejection, Rodriguez played for FC Dallas youth coach Victor Medina outside of the FC Dallas academy for three years. His career took off when Rodriguez starred for his club against professional youth sides from Mexico, like C.D. Guadalajara and Club León. From that point, Rodriguez signed for FC Dallas's academy in 2017. He helped the club win the prestigious Dallas Cup during his time with the academy.

=== Professional ===
On January 31, 2019, Rodriguez signed his first professional contract with North Texas SC, the reserve team of FC Dallas, in USL League One. Rodriguez's younger brother, David Rodriguez, was also signed to a professional contract with the club. Rodriguez made his debut on March 30, 2019, in a 3–2 win against the Chattanooga Red Wolves. Rodriguez helped lead North Texas to the USL League One 2019 regular season and post-season championship, while becoming the league's assist leader with 10 assists and a leading MVP candidate. On October 31 and November 1, respectively, Rodriguez was named both the Young Player of the Year and the League's Most Valuable Player (MVP). He scored his first goal for the club on November 5, 2019, against fellow MLS reserve side Orlando City B.

Rodriguez signed with Phoenix Rising FC on December 8, 2020, and left on January 23, 2023.

Rodriguez was signed by the Charleston Battery on March 24, 2023, to a one-year deal with an option for an additional year. Joining shortly after the start of the 2023 season, Arturo enjoyed ample success in his first year with the Battery. His first goal came on April 8 with one of the last kicks of the match against Hartford Athletic, securing Charleston the victory amid heavy rainfall. Rodriguez scored four goals and five assists across 27 Championship matches and led the team in chances created (44). Rodriguez provided heroics in the playoffs with two goals and two assists, including a goal in the Eastern Conference Final against Louisville City FC to knock out Louisville and win the conference title. Charleston would end runners-up in the USL Championship Final.

In 2024, Rodriguez's contract option was picked up by the Battery and he switched his number from 12 to 10.

Sacramento Republic FC signed Rodriguez for the 2026 USL Championship season, the terms of the contract were not disclosed.

== Personal life ==
Arturo's younger brother David is also a professional footballer. He plays for Liga MX club Atlético San Luis.

== Career statistics ==
=== Club ===
As of match played 25 October 2020

Appearances and goals by club, season and competition
Club	Season	League			US Open Cup		Play-offs		Total	
Club	Season	Division	Apps	Goals	Apps	Goals	Apps	Goals	Apps	Goals
North Texas SC	2019	USL League One	28	7	—		2	1	30	8
North Texas SC	2020	USL League One	9	3	—		—		9	3
North Texas SC	Total		37	10	—		2	1	39	11
Real Monarchs (loan)	2020	USL Championship	2	0	—		—		2	0
Phoenix Rising	2021	USL Championship	29	4	—		—		29	4
Phoenix Rising	2022	USL Championship	27	2	—		—		27	2
Charleston Battery	2023	USL Championship	30	4	—		—		30	4
Charleston Battery	2024	USL Championship	29	3	—		—		29	3
Charleston Battery	2025	USL Championship	35	6	—		—		35	6
Sacramento Republic FC	2026	USL Championship	—	—	—		—		—	—
Career total			152	19	0	0	2	1	1521	19

== Honours ==
North Texas SC

- USL League One Regular Season: 2019
- USL League One Championship: 2019

Charleston Battery

- Eastern Conference Champion (Playoffs): 2023

Individual

- USL League One Most Valuable Player: 2019
- USL League One Young Player of the Year: 2019

Sacramento Republic

- USL Championship Champion: 2026
