= Leland Archer =

Trinidadian footballer (born 1996)

Personal information
- Date of birth: 8 January 1996 (age 30)
- Place of birth: Port of Spain, Trinidad and Tobago
- Height: 6 ft 4 in (1.93 m)
- Position: Defender

Team information
- Current team: Tampa Bay Rowdies
- Number: 55

Youth career
- St. Ann's Rangers

College career
Years	Team	Apps	(Gls)
2014–2017	Charleston Cougars	68	(11)

Senior career*
Years	Team	Apps	(Gls)
2017	South Georgia Tormenta	14	(0)
2018–2025	Charleston Battery	179	(3)
2026–	Tampa Bay Rowdies	6	(0)

International career^{‡}
2012–2013	Trinidad and Tobago U17		
2015	Trinidad and Tobago U20		
2021–	Trinidad and Tobago	3	(0)
- * Club domestic league appearances and goals as of 17:59, 8 November 2026 (UTC) ‡ National team caps and goals as of 31 March 2023

Leland Archer (born 8 January 1996) is a Trinidadian professional footballer who plays as a defender for USL Championship club Tampa Bay Rowdies and the Trinidad and Tobago national team.

== Career ==
=== Youth and college ===
Archer played four years of college soccer at NCAA Division I program College of Charleston between 2014 and 2017.

While at college, Archer appeared for USL League Two side South Georgia Tormenta during their 2017 season.

=== Professional ===
On 10 May 2018, Archer signed a professional contract with USL Championship club Charleston Battery.

At the end of the 2020 USL Championship season, Archer was named Charleston Battery's Defensive Player of the Year and team MVP. That season, Archer was also named onto the USL Championship All-League Second Team.

On 11 November 2020, Scottish Premiership club Hibernian FC offered Archer 3-week trial at the club.

Archer scored his first professional goal on 22 September 2021, against New York Red Bulls II, in his 66th appearance with the club. He scored again the following match, on 25 September 2021, against Pittsburgh Riverhounds SC. He was subsequently named to the USL Championship Team of the Week for his complete performance that matchweek.

Archer played his 100th match for the Battery, across all competitions, on 15 October 2022, in a 1-1 draw with Loudoun United FC.

== International career ==
He made his debut for Trinidad and Tobago national football team on 31 January 2021 in a friendly game against the United States. He played the full game. Archer has been called up to numerous national team camps since his debut and made his second appearance on 29 January 2023 in a friendly against Saint Martin, playing a full 90 minutes in the 2-0 victory.

Archer was named as part of Trinidad and Tobago's 2023 CONCACAF Nations League squad for fixtures against Bahamas and Nicaragua. He played 45 minutes in the victory over the Bahamas, entering the match as a substitute at halftime, and was unused off the bench against Nicaragua.

== Honors ==
Charleston Battery

- Eastern Conference Champion (Playoffs): 2023

Individual

- USL Championship All-League Second Team: 2020
- 2020 Derek Revord Defensive Player of the Year
- 2020 Nigel Cooper Most Valuable Player
- 2023 Tim Hankinson Most Outstanding Player Award
