= Mark Segbers =

American soccer player (born 1996)

Personal information
- Full name: Mark Segbers
- Date of birth: April 18, 1996 (age 30)
- Place of birth: St. Louis, Missouri, United States
- Height: 5 ft 9 in (1.75 m)
- Positions: Full back; winger; forward

Team information
- Current team: Forward Madison
- Number: 8

College career
Years	Team	Apps	(Gls)
2014–2017	Wisconsin Badgers	77	(16)

Senior career*
Years	Team	Apps	(Gls)
2016–2017	Chicago FC United	21	(5)
2018	New England Revolution	1	(0)
2018	→ Orange County SC (loan)	19	(2)
2019	Swope Park Rangers	30	(1)
2020–2021	Memphis 901	40	(3)
2020	→ Los Angeles FC (loan)	0	(0)
2022–2023	Miami FC	64	(2)
2023–2025	Charleston Battery	55	(0)
2026–	Forward Madison	23	(0)
- * Club domestic league appearances and goals as of October 31, 2026

Mark Segbers (born April 18, 1996) is an American soccer player who currently plays for Forward Madison FC in the USL League One.

== Early life ==
Mark Segbers was born in St. Louis and is the son of Jim and Mimi Segbers and brother to Nick, David, Hayden, and Shelby Segbers. Segbers attended St. John Vianney High School, where he, as a sophomore, was named to Second Team Metro Catholic Conference. As a freshman, was a Metro Catholic Conference Honorable Mention and contributed to his team finishing as 2010 MSHSAA State Finalists.

== Career ==
=== College and amateur ===
Segbers played collegiate soccer for the Wisconsin Badgers for four seasons, receiving All-Big Ten second team honors in both 2014 and 2017, as well as receiving 2014 Big Ten All-Freshman honors in 2014.

=== Professional ===
On February 10, 2018, Segbers joined the New England Revolution of Major League Soccer. He made his Revolution debut, and scored his first Revolution goal, in a fourth round U.S. Open Cup match against Louisville City FC on June 5.

On March 15, 2018, he joined the Orange County SC of the United Soccer League on a season long loan. He made his professional debut on March 17, 2018, coming on as a substitute in a 1–1 draw against Phoenix Rising FC. He scored his first professional goals on April 7, 2018, scoring two in a 3–0 win against LA Galaxy II after coming on as a substitute in the 23rd minute.

New England released Segbers at the end of their 2018 season.

On February 6, 2019, Segbers joined USL Championship side Swope Park Rangers.

Following his release from Swope Park, Segbers made the move to fellow USL Championship side Memphis 901 on January 14, 2020.

On October 13, 2020, Segbers joined Major League Soccer club Los Angeles FC on loan for the remainder of the 2020 season.

On December 23, 2021, Segbers signed with Miami FC ahead of their 2022 season. On September 22, 2023, Segbers transferred to Charleston Battery.

On December 3, 2025, Forward Madison FC announced that Segbers had signed for the 2026 season.

== Honors ==
Wisconsin Badgers

- Big Ten Tournament: 2017

Charleston Battery

- Eastern Conference Champion (Playoffs): 2023

=== Individual ===
- Big Ten All-Freshman team: 2014
