= MD Myers =

American soccer player (born 2001)

Personal information
- Full name: Matthew Dylan Myers
- Date of birth: April 5, 2001 (age 25)
- Place of birth: Delran, New Jersey, United States
- Height: 1.83 m (6 ft 0 in)
- Position: Striker

Team information
- Current team: Tampa Bay Rowdies
- Number: 9

Youth career
- –2019: Philadelphia Union

College career
| Years | Team | Apps | (Gls) |
| 2019–2021 | High Point Panthers | 49 | (21) |
| 2022 | Rutgers Scarlet Knights | 18 | (13) |

Senior career*
| Years | Team | Apps | (Gls) |
| 2021–2022 | Ocean City Nor'easters | 19 | (6) |
| 2023 | New York City FC II | 28 | (19) |
| 2024–2025 | Charleston Battery | 60 | (30) |
| 2026– | Tampa Bay Rowdies | 28 | (13) |
- * Club domestic league appearances and goals as of 17:57, 8 November 2026 (UTC)

Matthew Dylan "MD" Myers (born April 5, 2001) is an American soccer player who currently plays as a striker for Tampa Bay Rowdies in the USL Championship.

== Career ==
=== Youth ===
Myers grew up in Delran, New Jersey, and spent time with Philadelphia Union academy.

=== College & amateur ===
In 2019, Myers attended High Point University where he played three seasons with the Panthers, scoring 21 goals and tallying eight assists in 49 appearances. He was joint leading scorer in Division I soccer during the 2020 season, and won numerous All-Big South Conference honors including Big South First Team All-Conference and Big South Offensive Player of the Year. Myers transferred to Rutgers University in 2022, scoring 13 times in 18 appearances for the Scarlet Knights, earning Big Ten Conference Player of the Year, and was named to the All-Big Ten First Team.

While at college, Myers also appeared for USL League Two side Ocean City Nor'easters in both their 2021 and 2022 seasons.

=== Professional ===
On December 21, 2022, Myers was drafted 66th overall in the 2023 MLS SuperDraft by New York City FC. He signed with the club's MLS Next Pro side New York City FC II on March 31, 2023, ahead of their upcoming season. Myers finished the season with 19 goals in 28 appearances, winning the MLS Next Pro Golden Boot. Myers transferred to USL Championship side Charleston Battery on February 1, 2024.

On December 15, 2025, Myers made the move to USL Championship side Tampa Bay Rowdies.
