= Emilio Ycaza =

American soccer player (born 1997)

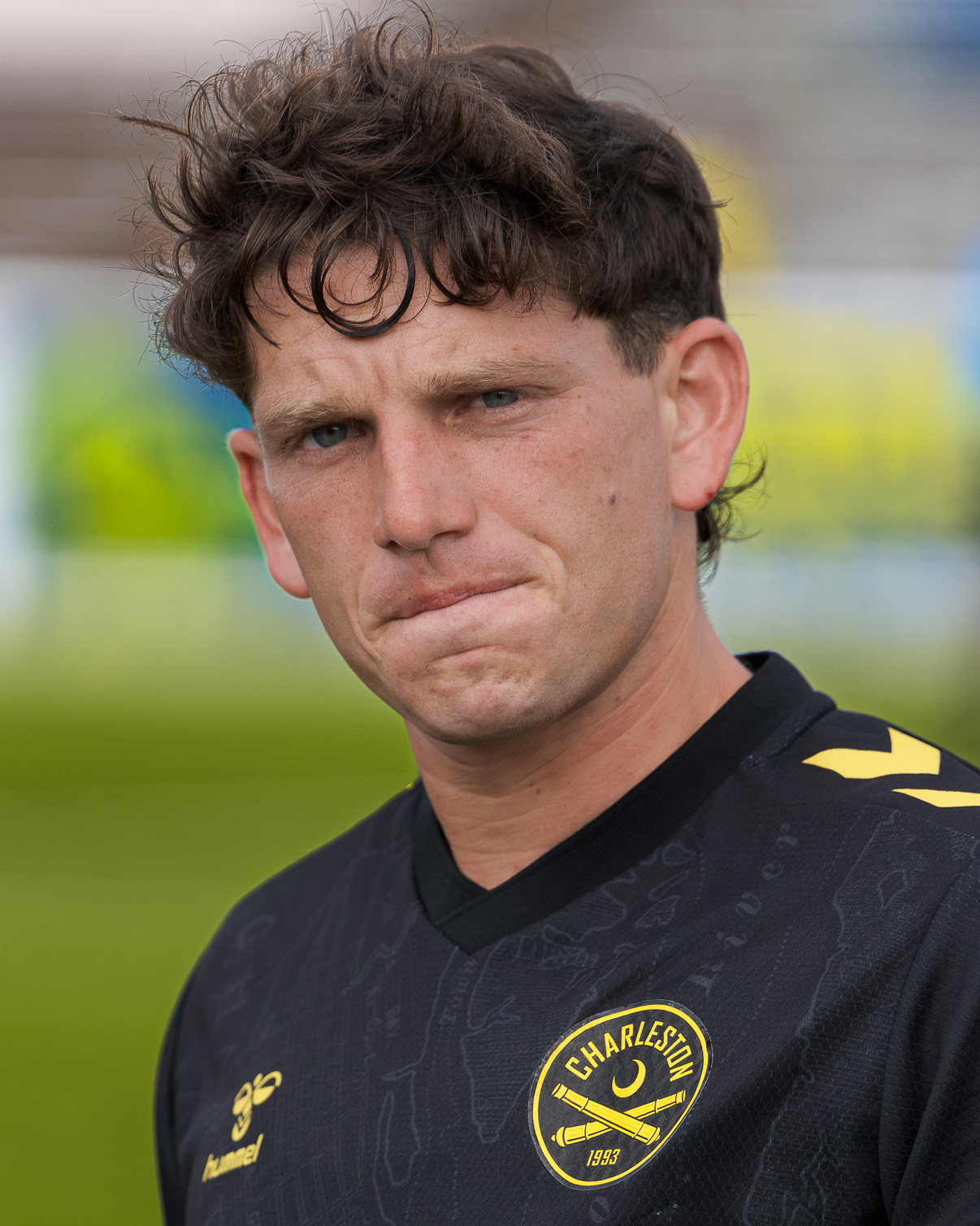
- Ycaza with Charleston Battery in 2026

Personal information
- Full name: Emilio Andres Ycaza
- Date of birth: 10 July 1997 (age 29)
- Place of birth: St. Petersburg, Florida, United States
- Height: 1.68 m (5 ft 6 in)
- Position: Midfielder

Team information
- Current team: Charleston Battery
- Number: 8

Youth career
- 2016–2017: St. Pete Raiders IF Brommapojkarna

College career
Years	Team	Apps	(Gls)
2018–2019	South Florida Bulls	32	(7)

Senior career*
Years	Team	Apps	(Gls)
2018	GPS Portland Phoenix	10	(3)
2020	Reno 1868	10	(1)
2021	Austin Bold	17	(0)
2021–2022	Rio Grande Valley	45	(7)
2023–	Charleston Battery	111	(17)
- * Club domestic league appearances and goals as of November 4, 2026

Emilio Ycaza (born 10 July 1997) is an American soccer player who plays as a midfielder for USL Championship side Charleston Battery.

== Career ==
=== Reno 1868 ===
Prior to the 2020 season, Ycaza signed with USL Championship club Reno 1868. He made his league debut for the club on 20 July 2020, starting in a 1–0 away defeat to the Sacramento Republic. Reno folded their team on November 6, 2020, due to the financial impact of the COVID-19 pandemic.

=== Austin Bold ===
On March 10, 2021, Ycaza signed with USL Championship side Austin Bold.

=== Rio Grande Valley ===
On September 3, 2021, Ycaza transferred to USL Championship side Rio Grande Valley.

=== Charleston Battery ===
On December 8, 2022, it was announced that Ycaza would join USL Championship side Charleston Battery from the 2023 season on a multi-year deal. Quickly developing into a fan-favorite, Ycaza was a spark at midfield and tallied four goals and three assists across 24 matches in the regular season and playoffs. Ycaza additionally tallied 28 chances created, 32 interceptions, 26 tackles won and 113 duels won during his first year with the Battery

Ycaza turned in memorable postseason performances when he scored in consecutive games, the Conference Quarterfinal and Semifinal, as part of the Battery's run to the 2023 USL Championship Final.

== Honors ==
Charleston Battery

- Eastern Conference Champion (Playoffs): 2023
