= Juan David Torres =

Colombian footballer (born 2001)

Personal information
- Full name: Juan David Torres Henríquez
- Date of birth: 31 March 2001 (age 25)
- Place of birth: Barranquilla, Colombia
- Height: 1.71 m (5 ft 7 in)
- Position: Midfielder

Team information
- Current team: Phoenix Rising (on loan from Charleston Battery)
- Number: 70

Youth career
- 2018–2019: Banfield
- 2019–2021: Corinthians
- 2022–2023: Millonarios

Senior career*
Years	Team	Apps	(Gls)
2023	Millonarios	8	(0)
2024–	Charleston Battery	54	(10)
2026	→ Sport Boys (loan)	14	(0)
2026–	→ Phoenix Rising (loan)	8	(0)

International career^{‡}
2019	Colombia U20	0	(0)
- * Club domestic league appearances and goals as of 20:11, 10 November 2026 (UTC) ‡ National team caps and goals as of 13:09, 15 April 2024 (UTC)

Juan David Torres Henríquez (born 31 March 2001) is a Colombian footballer who currently plays as a midfielder for Phoenix Rising, on loan from Charleston Battery in the USL Championship.

== Career ==
Torres signed his first academy deal with Argentinian Banfield, before joining Brazilian side Corinthians in 2019 where he stayed for two and a half years. Torres signed with Colombian Categoría Primera A club Millonarios towards the end of 2022, and went on to make eight league appearances in 2023. He was released by Millonarios at the end of their 2023 season.

Torres signed with USL Championship club Charleston Battery on 15 February 2024 after a successful trial during the preseason. In his first season in Charleston, Torres scored eight goals and led the team with seven assists in 36 matches across all competitions. He also led the Championship with six goals scored from outside the box. Torres scored from the halfway line for his first career professional goal, on April 20 against FC Tulsa, which was also featured on the SportsCenter Top 10.

Torres' contract option was exercised by the Battery following the 2024 season.

On 13 January 2026, Torres joined Peruvian Liga 1 side Sport Boys on loan, with the club holding a "six-figure" purchase option. His loan with Sports Boy ended in August 2026, and he was immediately loan to USL Championship side Phoenix Rising.

== Honours ==
Millonarios

- Categoría Primera Apertura Champion: 2023
