= Patriots Point Soccer Complex =

Stadium in Mount Pleasant, South Carolina

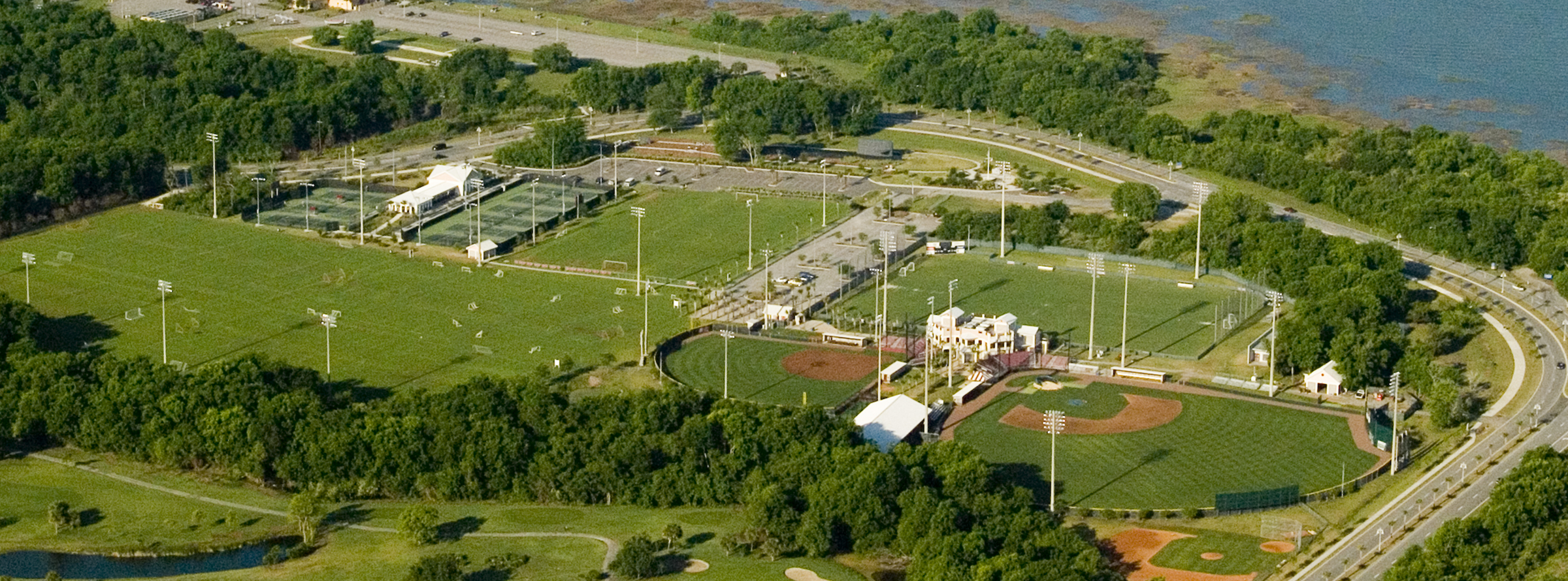
- Patriots Point Athletic Complex in 2006
- Interactive map of Patriots Point Soccer Complex
- Former names: Ralph Lundy Field
- Address: 85 Patriots Point Road; Mount Pleasant, South Carolina; United States
- Coordinates: 32.795143°N 79.902983°W
- Owner: College of Charleston
- Operator: Charleston Athletics
- Capacity: 3,900 (expandable to 5,000)
- Type: Soccer-specific stadium
- Surface: Natural grass

Construction
- Opened: 2000; 26 years ago
- Cost: $6.5 million

Tenants
- Charleston Cougars soccer (2000–present); Charleston Battery (USLC) (2020–present)

Website
- cofcsports.com/soccer-stadium

Patriots Point Soccer Complex is a soccer-specific stadium located in Mount Pleasant, South Carolina near the Arthur Ravenel Jr. Bridge and USS Yorktown. Since its opening in the fall of 2000, it has been home to the College of Charleston Cougars soccer teams, a member of the Division I Colonial Athletic Association. Additionally, the venue has hosted Charleston Battery of the USL Championship since the 2020 season.

The venue is situated across Charleston Harbor from the College of Charleston's campus. The field was dedicated as "Ralph Lundy Field" on September 28, 2019, in honor of long-time Cougars head coach Ralph Lundy.

In conjunction with the arrival of USL Championship club Charleston Battery to the facility for the 2020 season, the stadium underwent a renovation, increasing its capacity to 3,900.

The stadium hosted the 2023 USL Championship Final when the Charleston Battery lost to Phoenix Rising FC on penalty kicks.
