= Eastern Conference (USL Championship) =

Conference in United Soccer League

- League: USL Championship
- Sport: Soccer
- Founded: January 21, 2015
- No. of teams: 12
- Most recent champions: Louisville City FC (2026) (5th title)
- Most titles: Louisville City FC (5 titles)

The Eastern Conference is one of two conferences in USL Championship soccer.

== Current standings ==
Pos	Team	Pld	W	L	T	GF	GA	GD	Pts	Qualification
1	Tampa Bay Rowdies (S)	30	18	5	7	52	26	+26	61	Playoffs
2	Charleston Battery	30	16	9	5	56	35	+21	53	Playoffs
3	Detroit City FC	30	14	7	9	34	21	+13	51	Playoffs
4	Louisville City FC	30	13	9	8	51	43	+8	47	Playoffs
5	Pittsburgh Riverhounds SC	30	13	11	6	33	30	+3	45	Playoffs
6	Hartford Athletic	30	10	7	13	35	33	+2	43	Playoffs
7	Rhode Island FC	30	12	12	6	42	33	+9	42	Playoffs
8	Miami FC	30	9	12	9	39	49	−10	36	Playoffs
9	Indy Eleven	30	9	14	7	35	41	−6	34	
10	Birmingham Legion FC	30	6	12	12	40	46	−6	30	
11	Loudoun United FC	30	6	11	13	40	46	−6	31	
12	Brooklyn FC	30	5	19	6	34	63	−29	21	
13	Sporting Club Jacksonville	30	3	22	5	32	78	−46	14	

Updated to match(es) played on October 24, 2026. Source: USL Championship Standings
Rules for classification: 1) total wins against conference opponents; 2) goal differential against conference opponents; 3) goals scored against conference opponents; 4) head-to-head points against conference opponents; 5) points per game against conference opponents; 6) points per game against non-conference opponents; 7) fewest disciplinary points; 8) coin toss or drawing of lots
(S) Players' Shield winner

== Members ==
=== Current ===
Club	City	Stadium
Birmingham Legion FC	Birmingham, Alabama	Protective Stadium
Brooklyn FC	Brooklyn, New York	Maimonides Park
Charleston Battery	Charleston, South Carolina	Patriots Point Soccer Complex
Detroit City FC	Hamtramack, Michigan	Keyworth Stadium
Hartford Athletic	Hartford, Connecticut	Trinity Health Stadium
Indy Eleven	Indianapolis, Indiana	IU Michael A. Carroll Track & Soccer Stadium
Loudoun United FC	Leesburg, Virginia	Segra Field
Louisville City FC	Louisville, Kentucky	Lynn Family Stadium
Miami FC	Miami, Florida	Riccardo Silva Stadium
Pittsburgh Riverhounds	Pittsburgh, Pennsylvania	Highmark Stadium
Rhode Island FC	Smithfield, Rhode Island	Beirne Stadium
Sporting Club Jacksonville	Jacksonville, Florida	Hodges Stadium
Tampa Bay Rowdies	St. Petersburg, Florida	Al Lang Stadium

Locations of teams for the 2026 USL Championship season

== Conference Lineups ==
=== Clubs timeline ===
Conference Member Club moved to Western Conference Former clubs Club playing in different league On Hiatus

‡Orlando City B & Rochester Rhinos went on hiatus after the 2017 season. OKC Energy FC went and has been on hiatus since the 2021 season, and looks to be on hiatus until the 2028 season, under the name OKC United.

=== 2015 (12 teams) ===
- Charleston Battery
- Charlotte Independence
- Harrisburg City Islanders
- Louisville City FC
- FC Montreal
- New York Red Bulls II
- Pittsburgh Riverhounds
- Richmond Kickers
- Rochester Rhinos
- St. Louis FC
- Toronto FC II
- Wilmington Hammerheads

Changes from 2014: USL Pro expanded and was rebranded as simply USL; the round robin table was split into two conferences: Eastern and Western.

=== 2016 (14 teams) ===
- Bethlehem Steel FC
- Charleston Battery
- Charlotte Independence
- FC Cincinnati
- FC Montreal
- Harrisburg City Islanders
- Louisville City FC
- New York Red Bulls II
- Orlando City B
- Pittsburgh Riverhounds
- Richmond Kickers
- Rochester Rhinos
- Toronto FC II
- Wilmington Hammerheads

Changes from 2015: Bethlehem Steel FC, FC Cincinnati and Orlando City B were added as expansion franchises; St. Louis FC moved out to the Western Conference.

=== 2017 (15 teams) ===
- Bethlehem Steel FC
- Charleston Battery
- Charlotte Independence
- FC Cincinnati
- Harrisburg City Islanders
- Louisville City FC
- New York Red Bulls II
- Orlando City B
- Ottawa Fury FC
- Pittsburgh Riverhounds
- Richmond Kickers
- Rochester Rhinos
- Saint Louis FC
- Tampa Bay Rowdies
- Toronto FC II

Changes from 2016: Ottawa Fury FC and the Tampa Bay Rowdies moved in from the North American Soccer League; FC Montreal was disbanded; Saint Louis FC moved back in from the Western Conference; Wilmington Hammerheads FC moved out to the Premier Development League (now USL League Two).

=== 2018 (16 teams) ===
- Atlanta United 2
- Bethlehem Steel FC
- Charleston Battery
- Charlotte Independence
- FC Cincinnati
- Indy Eleven
- Louisville City FC
- Nashville SC
- New York Red Bulls II
- North Carolina FC
- Ottawa Fury FC
- Penn FC
- Pittsburgh Riverhounds
- Richmond Kickers
- Tampa Bay Rowdies
- Toronto FC II

Changes from 2017: USL was divided into three divisions: Championship, League One and League Two; Atlanta United 2 was added as an expansion franchise; Indy Eleven and North Carolina FC moved in from the North American Soccer League; Harrisburg City Islanders were renamed Penn FC; Orlando City B and the Rochester Rhinos went on hiatus; Saint Louis FC moved out back to the Western Conference.

=== 2019 (18 teams) ===
- Atlanta United 2
- Bethlehem Steel FC
- Birmingham Legion FC
- Charleston Battery
- Charlotte Independence
- Hartford Athletic
- Indy Eleven
- Loudoun United FC
- Louisville City FC
- Memphis 901 FC
- Nashville SC
- New York Red Bulls II
- North Carolina FC
- Ottawa Fury FC
- Pittsburgh Riverhounds
- Saint Louis FC
- Swope Park Rangers
- Tampa Bay Rowdies

Changes from 2018: FC Cincinnati disbanded to make way for the MLS franchise; Birmingham Legion FC, Hartford Athletic, Loudoun United FC and Memphis 901 FC were added as expansion franchises; Saint Louis FC and the Swope Park Rangers moved in from the Western Conference; Orlando City B, the Richmond Kickers and Toronto FC II moved out to USL League One; Penn FC and the Rochester Rhinos went on hiatus. Penn FC disbanded, while Rochester rebranded as Rochester NY FC for one season in MLSNP before ceasing operations.

=== 2020 (17 teams) ===
==== Group E (4 teams) ====
- Indy Eleven
- Louisville City FC
- Saint Louis FC
- Sporting Kansas City II

==== Group F (5 teams) ====
- Hartford Athletic
- Loudoun United FC
- New York Red Bulls II
- Philadelphia Union II
- Pittsburgh Riverhounds

==== Group G (4 teams) ====
- Birmingham Legion FC
- Charlotte Independence
- Memphis 901 FC
- North Carolina FC

==== Group H (4 teams) ====
- Atlanta United 2
- Charleston Battery
- Miami FC
- Tampa Bay Rowdies

Changes from 2019: Nashville SC moved out to Major League Soccer; Bethlehem Steel FC was renamed Philadelphia Union II; the Swope Park Rangers were renamed Sporting Kansas City II; Ottawa Fury FC was not sanctioned by U.S. Soccer and had their franchise rights sold to Miami FC; Penn FC was disbanded. In response to the COVID-19 pandemic the conference was split into four groups. Three groups of four and one group of five.

=== 2021 (16 teams) ===
==== Atlantic Division (8 teams) ====
- Charleston Battery
- Charlotte Independence
- Hartford Athletic
- Loudoun United FC
- Miami FC
- New York Red Bulls II
- Pittsburgh Riverhounds SC
- Tampa Bay Rowdies

==== Central Division (8 teams) ====
- Atlanta United 2
- Birmingham Legion FC
- Indy Eleven
- Louisville City FC
- Memphis 901 FC
- OKC Energy FC
- Sporting Kansas City II
- FC Tulsa

Changes from 2020: The conference was divided into two divisions, Atlantic and Central; the OKC Energy FC and FC Tulsa moved in from the Western Conference; North Carolina FC moved out to USL League One; Philadelphia Union II was withdrawn by its MLS parent club; Saint Louis FC was disbanded.

=== 2022 (14 teams) ===
- Atlanta United 2
- Birmingham Legion FC
- Charleston Battery
- Detroit City FC
- Hartford Athletic
- Indy Eleven
- Louisville City FC
- Loudoun United FC
- Memphis 901 FC
- Miami FC
- New York Red Bulls II
- Pittsburgh Riverhounds SC
- Tampa Bay Rowdies
- FC Tulsa

Changes from 2021: The Atlantic and Central divisions were dropped; OKC Energy FC went on hiatus; Charlotte Independence moved to USL League One; Detroit City FC joined from NISA; Sporting Kansas City II was withdrawn by its MLS parent club and moved to MLS Next Pro.

=== 2023 (12 teams) ===
- Birmingham Legion FC
- Charleston Battery
- Detroit City FC
- Hartford Athletic
- Indy Eleven
- Louisville City FC
- Loudoun United FC
- Memphis 901 FC
- Miami FC
- Pittsburgh Riverhounds SC
- Tampa Bay Rowdies
- FC Tulsa

Changes from 2022: Atlanta United 2 and New York Red Bulls II were withdrawn by its MLS parent club and moved to MLS Next Pro.

=== 2024–25 (12 teams) ===
- Birmingham Legion FC
- Charleston Battery
- Detroit City FC
- Hartford Athletic
- Indy Eleven
- Louisville City FC
- Loudoun United FC
- Miami FC
- North Carolina FC
- Pittsburgh Riverhounds SC
- Rhode Island FC
- Tampa Bay Rowdies

Changes from 2023: North Carolina FC returned from USL League One. Rhode Island FC was added as an expansion franchise. Memphis 901 FC and FC Tulsa were moved to the Western Conference.

=== 2026 (13 teams) ===
- Birmingham Legion FC
- Brooklyn FC
- Charleston Battery
- Detroit City FC
- Hartford Athletic
- Indy Eleven
- Louisville City FC
- Loudoun United FC
- Miami FC
- Pittsburgh Riverhounds SC
- Rhode Island FC
- Sporting Club Jacksonville
- Tampa Bay Rowdies

Changes from 2025: Brooklyn FC and Sporting Club Jacksonville are added as expansion teams. North Carolina FC pulled their team from competition in plans of making a move to the USL Premier at some point in the future.

== Eastern Conference Playoff champions by year ==
**Bold**	USL Champions

Season	Champions	Score	Runners up
2015	**Rochester Rhinos**	1–0	Louisville City FC
2016	**New York Red Bulls II**	1–1 (4–3 PK)	Louisville City FC
2017	**Louisville City FC**	1–1 (4–3 PK)	New York Red Bulls II
2018	**Louisville City FC**	5–1	New York Red Bulls II
2019	Louisville City FC	3–1 (AET)	Indy Eleven
2020 (Note: USL Championship game canceled due to COVID-19 outbreak in the Rowdies camp.)	Tampa Bay Rowdies	2–1	Louisville City FC
2021	Tampa Bay Rowdies	3–2 (AET)	Louisville City FC
2022	Louisville City FC	1–0 (AET)	Tampa Bay Rowdies
2023	Charleston Battery	2–1	Louisville City FC
2024	Rhode Island FC	2–1	Charleston Battery
2025	**Pittsburgh Riverhounds SC**	1–0	Rhode Island FC

== Eastern Conference regular season champions by year ==
**Bold**	Players' Shield Champions

Season	Team	Record	Playoffs result
2015	**Rochester Rhinos**	17–1–10 (+25)	**Won USL Championship**
2016	**New York Red Bulls II**	21–3–6 (+40)	**Won USL Championship**
2017	Louisville City FC	18–6–8 (+27)	**Won USL Championship**
2018	**FC Cincinnati**	23–3–8 (+38)	Lost Conference semifinals
2019	Pittsburgh Riverhounds SC	19-4-11 (+28)	Lost Conference semifinals
2020	Louisville City FC	11-3-2 (+16)	Lost Conference Final
2021	**Tampa Bay Rowdies**	23–7–2 (+32)	Lost Championship final
2022	Louisville City FC	22–6–6 (+37)	Lost Championship final
2023	**Pittsburgh Riverhounds SC**	19–5–10 (+21)	Lost Conference quarterfinals
2024	**Louisville City FC**	24–6–4 (+43)	Lost Conference semifinals
2025	**Louisville City FC**	22–1–7 (+37)	Lost Conference quarterfinals

== See also ==
- Western Conference (USL Championship)
