= 2022 Memphis 901 FC season =

Soccer season

Memphis 901 FC
2022 season
- Head coach: Ben Pirmann
- Stadium: AutoZone Park; Memphis, Tennessee
- USLC: Conference: 2nd Overall: 3rd
- USLC Playoffs: Eastern Semifinals
- U.S. Open Cup: 2nd Round
- Highest home attendance: 6,073 (Jun 4 vs. Atlanta)
- Lowest home attendance: 2,431 (Mar 12 vs Pittsburgh)
- Average home league attendance: 3,634
- Biggest win: MEM 5–0 LA2 (May 18); MEM 5–0 CHA (Sep. 16)
- Biggest defeat: MEM 0–3 PIT (Mar. 12)
Home colours	Away colours

The 2022 Memphis 901 FC season was the fourth season for Memphis 901 FC in the USL Championship, the second-tier professional soccer league in the United States and Canada.

The team finished 2nd in the Eastern Conference standings during the regular season with 68 points. Phillip Goodrum set a new Memphis record for goals scored during the regular season with 21—one ahead of Kyle Murphy's 20 goals from the 2021 season. Memphis 901 qualified for the USL Championship Playoffs and were eliminated at home in the Eastern Conference Semifinals by the Tampa Bay Rowdies. The 1–0 loss was decided by a set of penalties in stoppage time: a Memphis penalty that was saved by Phil Breno and a Tampa penalty scored by Leo Fernandes.

== Players and staff ==
=== Final roster ===
As of October 16, 2022

No.	Pos.	Player	Nation
1	GK	USA	Drew Romig
2	DF	NZL	Jackson Brady
3	DF	USA	Zach Carroll
6	MF	IRL	Aaron Molloy
7	DF	USA	Patrick Seagrist
8	MF	ENG	Chris Allan
9	MF	BRA	Luiz Fernando
10	FW	USA	Phillip Goodrum
11	MF	CIV	Laurent Kissiedou
12	FW	NGR	David Egbo (on loan from Vancouver Whitecaps)
13	GK	USA	John Berner
14	FW	USA	Derek Dodson
15	DF	USA	Mitchell Myers
16	DF	USA	Graham Smith
17	MF	USA	Devin Boyce
18	MF	USA	Jeremy Kelly
19	DF	USA	Rece Buckmaster
20	FW	USA	Nighte Pickering
21	DF	BRA	Lucas Turci
23	MF	TTO	Leston Paul
24	FW	SOM	Handwalla Bwana (on loan from Nashville)
25	GK	USA	Trey Muse (on loan from Loudoun United)
50	DF	NIR	Niall Logue
77	FW	USA	Dylan Borczak
88	MF	USA	Max Talley

Signed to a USL academy contract

=== Staff ===
As of October 16, 2022

Technical staff
Sporting director	Tim Howard
Assistant sporting director	Caleb Patterson-Sewell
Head coach	Ben Pirmann
Assistant coach	Devin Rensing
Assistant coach	Caleb Patterson-Sewell
Director of performance	Alexis Holt
Athletic trainer	Angie Ziolkowski

== Competitions ==
=== USL Championship ===
==== Eastern Conference standings ====
Pos	Team	Pld	W	L	T	GF	GA	GD	Pts	Qualification
1	Louisville City FC	34	22	6	6	65	28	+37	72	Qualification for the Conference Semifinals
2	Memphis 901 FC	34	21	8	5	67	33	+34	68	Playoffs
3	Tampa Bay Rowdies	34	20	7	7	73	33	+40	67	Playoffs
4	Birmingham Legion FC	34	17	10	7	56	37	+19	58	Playoffs
5	Pittsburgh Riverhounds SC	34	16	9	9	50	38	+12	57	Playoffs
6	Miami FC	34	15	9	10	47	32	+15	55	Playoffs
7	Detroit City FC	34	14	8	12	44	30	+14	54	Playoffs
8	FC Tulsa	34	12	16	6	48	58	−10	42	
9	Indy Eleven	34	12	17	5	41	55	−14	41	
10	Hartford Athletic	34	10	18	6	47	57	−10	36	
11	Loudoun United FC	34	8	22	4	36	74	−38	28	
12	Charleston Battery	34	6	21	7	41	77	−36	25	
13	Atlanta United 2	34	6	23	5	39	85	−46	23	
14	New York Red Bulls II	34	3	25	6	24	76	−52	15	

Source: USL Championship Standings
Rules for classification: 1) head-to-head points; 2) head-to-head goal differential; 3) points-per game within conference; 4) total wins; 5) total goal differential; 6) total goals scored; 7) points earned against top four Conference finishers; 8) disciplinary points; 9) coin toss or drawing of lots

==== Match results ====
The 2022 USL Championship season schedule for the club was announced on January 12, 2022.

Win Draw Loss Upcoming fixture

Unless otherwise noted, all times in Central time

March 12 1	Memphis 901 FC	0–3	Pittsburgh Riverhounds SC	Memphis, TN
6:00PM CDT	Smith (yellow card) 20' (yellow-red card) 34'; Logue (yellow card) 39'; Paul (yellow card) 58'; Seagrist (yellow card) 58'	Report	Kelly 45+3'; Cicerone 64'; Dikwa 76'	Stadium: Autozone Park; Attendance: 2,431; Referee: Kevin Broadley

March 19 2	Memphis 901 FC	2–1	Oakland Roots SC	Memphis, TN
6:00PM CDT	Dodson (yellow card) 11'; Molloy 13'; Goodrum (yellow card) 35'; Seagrist 42'; Allan (yellow card) 90+1'	Report	Fissore (yellow card) 54'; Barbir (yellow card) 66'; Dennis (yellow card) 72'; Formella 81', (yellow card) 90+4'	Stadium: Autozone Park; Attendance: 3,023; Referee: Benjamin Meyer

March 26 3	Las Vegas Lights FC	1–2	Memphis 901 FC	Las Vegas, Nevada
9:00PM CDT	Jennings (yellow card) 33'; Bjørshol (yellow card) 52'	Report	Kelly 51', (yellow card) 61'; Allan (yellow card) 79'; Kissiedou (yellow card) 85'; Logue (yellow card) 90+1'	Stadium: Cashman Field; Attendance: 5,391; Referee: Kevin Fikar

April 2 4	Detroit City FC	1–1	Memphis 901 FC	Hamtramck, Michigan
3:00PM CDT	Diop (yellow card) 13'; Rodríguez (yellow card) 40'; Williams (yellow card) 68'; Botello Faz 73'	Report	Goodrum 28'; Kissiedou (yellow card) 53'	Stadium: Keyworth Stadium; Attendance: 4,157; Referee: Jeremy Scheer

April 16 5	Colorado Springs Switchbacks FC	1–2	Memphis 901 FC	Colorado Springs, Colorado
7:00PM CDT	Ockford (yellow card) 7'; Barry (yellow card) 7'; Lindley (yellow card) 83'; Mahoney 90+1'	Report	Dodson (yellow card) 39'; Molloy 43'; Smith (yellow card) 51'; Goodrum 59'; Muse (yellow card) 61'	Stadium: Weidner Field; Attendance: 7,334; Referee: Elton Garcia

April 27 6	Memphis 901 FC	3–1	Tampa Bay Rowdies	Memphis, TN
7:00PM CDT	Goodrum 1', (yellow card) 45'; Dodson 45+2'; Paul (yellow card) 68'; Allan 85'	Report	Hilton 4'; Harris (yellow card) 11'; Guillén (yellow card) 11'; Dos Santos (yellow card) 38' (yellow-red card) 58'	Stadium: Autozone Park; Attendance: 2,848; Referee: Jervis Atagana

April 30 7	Memphis 901 FC	1–2	Miami FC	Memphis, TN
7:00PM CDT	Seagrist (yellow card) 40'; Kizza (yellow card) 52'; Molloy (yellow card) 57'; Kissiedou 76'	Report	Murphy 7'; Da Silva 11'; Akinyode (yellow card) 90+2'	Stadium: Autozone Park; Attendance: 3,706; Referee: John Griggs

May 6 8	Charleston Battery	0–2	Memphis 901 FC	Mount Pleasant, South Carolina
6:00PM CDT	Hogan (yellow card) 34'; Archer (yellow card) 65'; Weber (yellow card) 76'	Report	Kelly (yellow card) 13', (goal) 40'; Kissiedou (yellow card) 26'; Fernando 32'; Goodrum (yellow card) 50'; Logue (yellow card) 57' (yellow-red card) 81'	Stadium: Patriots Point Soccer Complex; Attendance: 3,026; Referee: Kevin Broadley

May 14 9	Memphis 901 FC	2–1	Indy Eleven	Memphis, TN
7:00PM CDT	Carroll 34'; Paul (yellow card) 45'; Kissiedou 58'; Seagrist (yellow card) 68'	Report	Hackshaw (yellow card) 42'; Fjeldberg 66'; Ingram (yellow card) 74'; Law (yellow card) 80'	Stadium: Autozone Park; Attendance: 3,515; Referee: Matthew Thompson

May 18 10	Memphis 901 FC	5–0	LA Galaxy II	Memphis, TN
7:00PM CDT	Kissiedou 14', (yellow card) 32'; Molloy 19'; Kelly 45'; Carroll (yellow card) 52'; Goodrum 58'; Egbo 82'	Report	Cabral (yellow card) 39'; Barry (yellow card) 56'; Lambe (yellow card) 70'; Campbell (yellow card) 85'; Harvey (red card) 90'	Stadium: Autozone Park; Attendance: 2,768; Referee: Jervis Atagana

May 22 11	Loudoun United FC	0–3	Memphis 901 FC	Leesburg, Virginia
3:00PM CDT	Lillard (yellow card) 27'; Yow (yellow card) 55'; Sargis (yellow card) 64'; Houssou (yellow card) 75'; Ku-DiPietro (yellow card) 90+2'	Report	Kissiedou 5', (yellow card) 66'; Kelly 29'; Goodrum 55'; Paul (yellow card) 55'; Allan (yellow card) 67'	Attendance: 1,106; Referee: Jeremy Scheer

June 4 12	Memphis 901 FC	5–2	Atlanta United 2	Memphis, TN
7:30PM CDT	Goodrum 26', 30', (yellow card) 4'; Kissiedou 24'; Kelly (yellow card) 33'; Smith (yellow card) 45+1'; Molloy 70'; Turci 82'	Report	Sullins (yellow card) 3', (goal) 46'; Mertz 18'; Centeno (yellow card) 68'; Matheus (yellow card) 85'	Stadium: Autozone Park; Attendance: 6,073; Referee: Thomas Snyder

June 8 13	Birmingham Legion FC	1–0	Memphis 901 FC	Birmingham, Alabama
7:00PM CDT	Marlon (yellow card) 40'; Kavita (yellow card) 51'; Asiedu 90'; Martinez (yellow card) 90+4'	Report	Logue (yellow card) 25'; Seagrist (yellow card) 35'; Boyce (yellow card) 89'	Stadium: Protective Stadium; Attendance: N/A; Referee: Abdou Ndiaye

June 15 14	Hartford Athletic	1–1	Memphis 901 FC	Hartford, Connecticut
6:00PM CDT	Obregón Jr. 21'	Report	Goodrum 64'; Molloy (yellow card) 77'	Stadium: Trinity Health Stadium; Attendance: 5,472; Referee: Austin Saini

June 22 15	Memphis 901 FC	2–0	FC Tulsa	Memphis, TN
7:00PM CDT	Smith 14'; Goodrum (yellow card) 62'; Dodson 84'	Report	Fenwick (yellow card) 55'	Stadium: Autozone Park; Attendance: 2,710; Referee: Greg Dopka

June 25 16	Memphis 901 FC	2–0	Detroit City FC	Memphis, TN
7:30PM CDT	Goodrum 89', (yellow card) 1'; Smith 37'	Report	Hoppenot (yellow card) 36'; Rodriguez (yellow card) 55'; Wynne (yellow card) 79'; Bryant (yellow card) 90+6'	Stadium: Autozone Park; Attendance: 3,883; Referee: Joshua Encarnacion

July 2 17	Tampa Bay Rowdies	2–0	Memphis 901 FC	St. Petersburg, Florida
6:30PM CDT	LaCava 3', 19'; Wyke (yellow card) 52'	Report	Turci (yellow card) 8' (yellow-red card) 60'; Paul (yellow card) 65'	Stadium: Al Lang Stadium; Attendance: 6,175; Referee: Kevin Broadley

July 9 18	Memphis 901 FC	3–1	Phoenix Rising FC	Memphis, TN
7:30PM CDT	Goodrum 29'; Buckmaster 34', (yellow card) 84'; Smith 85'	Report	Lambert 37', (yellow card) 83'; Flood (red card) 82'; Antwi (yellow card) 90+6'; Donasiyano (yellow card) 90+6'	Stadium: Autozone Park; Attendance: 3,703; Referee: Matthew Conger

July 16 19	Memphis 901 FC	1–2	Louisville City FC	Memphis, TN
7:30PM CDT	Seagrist (yellow card) 9' (yellow-red card) 45+1'; Molloy (yellow card) 39'; Goodrum 66', (yellow card) 85'; Kelly (yellow card) 71'; Paul (yellow card) 80'	Report	González (yellow card) 26'; Dia (yellow card) 49' (yellow-red card) 62'; Morton (yellow card) 62'; Ownby 72', 81'	Stadium: Autozone Park; Attendance: 4,834; Referee: Michael Radchuk

July 23 20	Indy Eleven	1–1	Memphis 901 FC	Indianapolis, Indiana
6:00PM CDT	Asante 9'; Aguilera (yellow card) 24'; Brown (yellow card) 79'; Cochran (yellow card) 90'; Hackshaw (yellow card) 90+1'	Report	Smith (yellow card) 14'; Goodrum 23'; Fernando (yellow card) 43'	Stadium: Carroll Stadium; Attendance: 9,020; Referee: Natalie Simon

August 3 21	New York Red Bulls II	1–2	Memphis 901 FC	Montclair, New Jersey
6:00PM CDT	Ofori (yellow card) 21'; Clark (yellow card) 36'; Sserwadda (yellow card) 63'; Adebayo-Smith 87'	Report	Kelly 17'; Goodrum (yellow card) 47', (goal) 70'; Paul (yellow card) 90+2'	Stadium: MSU Soccer Park; Attendance: 382; Referee: Sergii Demianchuk

August 6 22	Memphis 901 FC	3–1	Hartford Athletic	Memphis, TN
7:30PM CDT	Allan (yellow card) 11'; Molloy 41'; Carroll 44'; Kelly (yellow card) 58'; Pickering 87'	Report	Saydee 37'; Barrera (yellow card) 51'; Gdula (yellow card) 71'; Martínez (yellow card) 83'; Curry (yellow card) 90'	Stadium: Autozone Park; Attendance: 3,876; Referee: John Griggs

August 13 23	Pittsburgh Riverhounds SC	0–2	Memphis 901 FC	Pittsburgh, Pennsylvania
6:00PM CDT	Wiedt (yellow card) 32'; Dossantos (yellow card) 54'; Kizza (yellow card) 78'; Ordoñez (yellow card) 90+3'	Report	Fernando 8'; Carroll (yellow card) 23'; Molloy 73'; Egbo (yellow card) 90+3'	Stadium: Highmark Stadium; Attendance: 4,746; Referee: Brad Jensen

August 17 24	New Mexico United	0–2	Memphis 901 FC	Albuquerque, New Mexico
8:00PM CDT	Seymore (yellow card) 44'; Frater (yellow card) 56'	Report	Buckmaster (yellow card) 30'; Fernando 37'; Goodrum 90+2'	Stadium: Rio Grande Credit Union Field; Attendance: 7,414; Referee: Jose Carlos Rivero

August 20 25	Memphis 901 FC	2–4	Birmingham Legion FC	Memphis, TN
7:30PM CDT	Seagrist (yellow card) 8'; Fernando 18'; Molloy (yellow card) 22'; Kelly 61'; Turci (yellow card) 87'; Egbo (yellow card) 90+2'	Report	Agudelo 28'; Marlon (yellow card) 42', (goal) 59'; Crognale 44'; Lopez (yellow card) 58'; Martínez (yellow card) 63', (goal) 70'	Stadium: Autozone Park; Attendance: 3,759; Referee: Matthew Franz

August 31 26	Memphis 901 FC	0–1	Loudoun United FC	Memphis, TN
7:00PM CDT	Smith (yellow card) 50' (yellow-red card) 90'; Turci (yellow card) 90+6'	Report	Greene 56'; Downs (yellow card) 65'; Zamudio (yellow card) 84'; Sargis (yellow card) 90+5'	Stadium: Autozone Park; Attendance: 3,001; Referee: DeShun Beard

September 3 27	Orange County SC	1–1	Memphis 901 FC	Irvine, California
9:00PM CDT	Orozco (yellow card) 22'; Illoski 43'; Illoski (yellow card) 51'; Pedersen (yellow card) 57'; Rocha (yellow card) 84'	Report	Allan (yellow card) 32'; Kelly 85'	Stadium: Championship Soccer Stadium; Attendance: 3,784; Referee: Adam Kilpatrick

September 7 28	Atlanta United 2	0–4	Memphis 901 FC	Kennesaw, Georgia
6:30PM CDT	Morales (yellow card) 34'	Report	Goodrum 36', 43', 51'; Allan (yellow card) 63'; Bwana 64'	Stadium: Fifth Third Bank Stadium; Attendance: 449; Referee: Ricardo Fierro

September 16 29	Memphis 901 FC	5–0	Charleston Battery	Memphis, TN
7:00PM CDT	Goodrum 8', 12'; Kelly (yellow card) 21'; Kissiedou 30', (yellow card) 34'; Carroll 72'; Turci (yellow card) 81'; Pickering 90+1'	Report	Archer (yellow card) 5' (yellow-red card) 66'; Cichero (yellow card) 17' (yellow-red card) 59'; Harmon (red card) 33'; Fauroux (yellow card) 66'; Apodaca (yellow card) 83'	Stadium: Autozone Park; Attendance: 4,161; Referee: Jervis Atagana

September 23 30	Louisville City FC	1–2	Memphis 901 FC	Louisville, Kentucky
7:00PM CDT	Mushagalusa (yellow card) 29'; Harris 47'; Gibson (red card) 90+7'	Report	Fernando (yellow card) 29'; Dodson 61'; Smith 90+5'; Logue (yellow card) 90+5'; Goodrum (red card) 90+7'; Buckmaster (red card) 90+7'	Stadium: Lynn Family Stadium; Attendance: 10,808; Referee: Gabriele Giusti

October 1 31	Miami FC	1–0	Memphis 901 FC	University Park, Florida
6:00PM CDT	Murphy (yellow card) 41'; Reid 90'	Report	Seagrist (yellow card) 18'; Pickering (yellow card) 23'; Paul (yellow card) 57'	Attendance: 1,492; Referee: Elvis Osmanovic

October 5 32	Memphis 901 FC	2–2	Rio Grande Valley FC	Memphis, TN
7:00PM CDT	Kelly 2', (yellow card) 69'; Smith (yellow card) 33'; Goodrum (yellow card) 48'; Kissiedou 55'; Logue (yellow card) 60'; Paul (yellow card) 79'	Report	Malesevic (yellow card) 29'; Torres 73'; Smith 22' (o.g.); Fjeldberg (yellow card) 90+1'	Stadium: Autozone Park; Attendance: 3,072; Referee: Gabriele Giusti

October 9 33	Memphis 901 FC	2–1	New York Red Bulls II	Memphis, TN
3:00PM CDT	Molloy 21'; Goodrum (yellow card) 28', (goal) 87'; Seagrist (yellow card) 37'	Report	Plaza 13'; Rutkowski (yellow card) 20'; Nocita (yellow card) 51'; Salinas (yellow card) 65'	Stadium: Autozone Park; Attendance: 4,408; Referee: Thomas Snyder

October 15 34	FC Tulsa	0–3	Memphis 901 FC	Tulsa, Oklahoma
7:30PM CDT	Brown (yellow card) 78'; Obinwa (yellow card) 90+3'	Report	Goodrum 9'; Molloy 37'; Borczak 55'	Stadium: Oneok Field; Attendance: 5,392; Referee: Malik Badawi

==== USL Playoffs ====
October 22 Eastern 1st Round	Memphis 901 FC	3–1	Detroit City FC	Memphis, TN
7:00PM CDT	Buckmaster (yellow card) 51'; Allan 72'; Smith 88'; Goodrum 90+4'	Report	Rodriguez (yellow card) 10'; Bryant (yellow card) 75'; Matthews 77'; Lewis (yellow card) 85'	Stadium: Autozone Park; Attendance: 6,010; Referee: Elijio Arreguin

October 30 Eastern Semifinals	Memphis 901 FC	0–1	Tampa Bay Rowdies	Memphis, TN
3:00PM CDT	Goodrum (yellow card) 51'; Kissiedou (yellow card) 90+7'; Paul (yellow card) 90+10'	Report	Guillén (yellow card) 29'; Dalgaard (yellow card) 74'; Guenzatti (yellow card) 80'; Scarlett (yellow card) 90+3'; Hilton (yellow card) 90+8'; Fernandes 90+9'	Stadium: Autozone Park; Attendance: 6,063; Referee: Elton Garcia

=== US Open Cup ===
Memphis 901 FC entered the 2022 US Open Cup in the 2nd round with the rest of the USLC teams.

April 7 USOC Round 2	Chattanooga FC	3–1	Memphis 901 FC	Chattanooga, TN
6:00PM CDT	McGrath 1'; Ward 29'; Gray 45+3'; Robinson (yellow card) 90+5'	Report	Seagrist 39'; Buckmaster (yellow card) 86'; Fernando (yellow card) 89'	Stadium: Finley Stadium; Attendance: 2,027; Referee: Wes Caouette

== Stats ==
Regular Season
No.	Player Name	Pos.	Apps	Sta.	M	G	A	Booked	(yellow card) (yellow-red card)	Sent off (straight red)
1	(United States) Drew Romig	GK	2	2	180	0	0	0	0	0
2	(New Zealand) Jackson Brady	DF	4	0	12	0	0	0	0	0
3	(United States) Zach Carroll	DF	29	9	897	3	0	2	0	0
4	(United States) Jeremy Kelly	MF	36	35	2967	8	10	7	0	0
6	(Republic of Ireland) Aaron Molloy	MF	35	35	3090	8	10	4	0	0
7	(United States) Patrick Seagrist	DF	35	34	3038	1	4	7	1	0
8	(England) Chris Allan	MF	31	14	1403	2	2	6	0	0
9	(Brazil) Luiz Fernando	MF	29	22	1885	4	5	2	0	0
10	(United States) Phillip Goodrum	FW	34	34	2720	22	6	12	0	1
11	(Ivory Coast) Laurent Kissiedou	MF	27	24	2027	7	5	7	0	0
13	(United States) John Berner	GK	2	2	180	0	0	0	0	0
14	(United States) Derek Dodson	FW	30	22	2009	3	3	2	0	0
15	(United States) Mitchell Myers	DF	3	0	18	0	0	0	0	0
16	(United States) Graham Smith	DF	34	3	2858	5	0	4	2	0
17	(United States) Devin Boyce	MF	15	2	290	0	0	1	0	0
19	(United States) Rece Buckmaster	DF	35	35	3139	1	5	3	0	1
20	(United States) Nighte Pickering	FW	7	1	140	2	0	1	0	0
21	(Brazil) Lucas Turci	DF	23	8	835	1	1	3	1	0
22	(Uganda) Edward Kizza	FW	8	0	111	0	0	1	0	0
23	(Trinidad and Tobago) Leston Paul	MF	29	29	2415	0	7	10	0	0
24	(Somalia) Handwalla Bwana	FW	4	1	130	1	0	0	0	0
25	(United States) Trey Muse	GK	32	32	2879	0	0	1	0	1
33	(United States) Aaron O'Malley	MF	0	0	0	0	0	0	0	0
45	(United States) Simeon Betapudi	FW	1	0	1	0	0	0	0	0
49	(United States) Matt Brucker	FW	0	0	0	0	0	0	0	0
50	(Northern Ireland) Niall Logue	DF	25	19	1749	0	0	5	1	0
77	(United States) Dylan Borczak	FW	3	1	150	1	0	0	0	0
88	(United States) Max Talley	MF	2	0	15	0	0	0	0	0
99	(Nigeria) David Egbo	FW	18	1	275	1	0	2	0	0

== Player movement ==
Per United Soccer League and club policies, terms of the deals do not get disclosed.

=== Players in ===
Re-Signed
No.	Name	Pos.	First Signed	Years at 901 FC	Fee/Notes	Announced	Ref.
23	(Trinidad and Tobago) Leston Paul	MF	December 10, 2018	3 years	Re-signed	January 5, 2022	
3	(United States) Zach Carroll	DF	January 13, 2020	2 years	Re-signed	January 6, 2022	
11	(Ivory Coast) Laurent Kissiedou	MF	April 26, 2021	1 year	Re-signed	January 10, 2022	
13	(United States) John Berner	GK	March 5, 2021	1 year	Re-signed	January 19, 2022	
45	(United States) Simeon Betapudi	FW	May 28, 2021	1 year	Re-signed - Academy Contract	February 16, 2022	
49	(United States) Matt Brucker	FW	June 4, 2021	1 year	Re-signed - Academy Contract	February 16, 2022	
88	(United States) Max Talley	MF	June 4, 2021	1 year	Re-signed - Academy Contract	February 16, 2022	

Transfers In
No.	Name	Pos.	Last Team	Fee/Notes	Announced	Ref.
50	(Northern Ireland) Niall Logue	DF	(United States) El Paso Locomotive FC	Free Agent Transfer - Logue played for 901 FC on loan in 2021	January 7, 2022	
6	(Republic of Ireland) Aaron Molloy	MF	(United States) Forward Madison FC	Player purchase - Undisclosed fee	January 11, 2022	
10	(United States) Phillip Goodrum	FW	(United States) Atlanta United 2	Free Agent Transfer	January 14, 2022	
19	(United States) Rece Buckmaster	DF	(United States) Indy Eleven	Free Agent Transfer - Buckmaster played for 901 FC in 2020	January 18, 2022	
7	(United States) Patrick Seagrist	DF	(United States) Indy Eleven	Free Agent Transfer	January 20, 2022	
17	(United States) Devin Boyce	MF	(United States) Union Omaha	Free Agent Transfer	January 20, 2022	
8	(England) Chris Allan	MF	(United States) Atlanta United 2	Free Agent Transfer	January 21, 2022	
15	(United States) Mitchell Myers	DF	(United States) Wofford College	Rookie Contract	February 9, 2022	
33	(United States) Aaron O'Malley	MF	(United States) Houston High School	Academy Contract	February 16, 2022	
9	(Brazil) Luiz Fernando	MF	(United States) Tampa Bay Rowdies	Free Agent Transfer	February 16, 2022	
16	(United States) Graham Smith	DF	(United States) Sporting Kansas City	Free Agent Transfer	February 18, 2022	
4	(United States) Jeremy Kelly	MF	(United States) Phoenix Rising FC	Free Agent Transfer	February 18, 2022	
14	(United States) Derek Dodson	FW	(United States) Orlando City SC	Free Agent Transfer	February 18, 2022	
1	(United States) Drew Romig	GK	(United States) Belmont University	Rookie Contract	March 5, 2022	
21	(Brazil) Lucas Turci	DF	Free agent	Free Agent Transfer	March 11, 2022	
20	(United States) Nighte Pickering	FW	(United States) FC Dallas Academy	Rookie Contract	August 4, 2022	
2	(New Zealand) Jackson Brady	DF	(United States) Cal Poly State University	Originally 25-day contract. Extended on Sept 2.	August 8, 2022	
20	(United States) Dylan Borczak	FW	(United States) Rio Grande Valley FC	Player purchase - Undisclosed fee	September 30, 2022	

Loans In
No.	Name	Pos.	Loaned from	Fee/Notes	Announced	Ref.
12	(Nigeria) David Egbo	FW	(Canada) Vancouver Whitecaps FC	Season loan from MLS contract. Right to recall anytime.	February 24, 2022	
25	(United States) Trey Muse	GK	(United States) Loudoun United	Season loan from USLC contract	March 11, 2022	
22	(Uganda) Edward Kizza	FW	(United States) New England Revolution	Season loan from MLS contract. Right to recall anytime.	March 30, 2022	
24	(Somalia) Handwalla Bwana	MF	(United States) Nashville SC	Season loan from MLS contract. Right to recall anytime.	August 19, 2022	

=== Players out ===
Transfers Out
No.	Name	Pos.	Transferred to	Fee/Notes	Date	Ref.
36	(United States) Andre Reynolds	DF	(United States) Chicago Fire FC	Loan return	November 30, 2021	
28	(United States) Brady Scott	GK	(United States) Austin FC	Loan return	November 30, 2021	
22	(United States) Cody Cropper	GK	(United States) FC Cincinnati	Loan return	November 30, 2021	
50	(Northern Ireland) Niall Logue	DF	(United States) El Paso Locomotive FC	Loan return	November 30, 2021	
17	(China) Tycho Collins	DF	(United States) Florida Atlantic University	Academy Contract Ended - Fall College Soccer	November 30, 2021	
31	(United States) Jake Gelnovatch	GK	Retired / Not Professional	Out of Contract	November 30, 2021	
33	(Canada) Skylar Thomas	DF	Retired / Not Professional	Out of Contract	November 30, 2021	
8	(Puerto Rico) Raúl González	DF	Retired / Not Professional	Out of Contract	November 30, 2021	
10	(United States) Kadeem Dacres	MF	Retired / Not Professional	Out of Contract	November 30, 2021	
7	(United States) Mitch Guitar	MF	Retired / Not Professional	Out of Contract	November 30, 2021	
77	(United States) Alan Winn	FW	Retired / Not Professional	Out of Contract	November 30, 2021	
20	(Belgium) Roland Lamah	FW	Retired / Not Professional	Out of Contract	November 30, 2021	
9	(United States) Kyle Murphy	FW	(United States) Miami FC	Out of Contract Move	December 15, 2021	
2	(United States) Mark Segbers	DF	(United States) Miami FC	Out of Contract Move	December 23, 2021	
5	(United States) Brecc Evans	DF	(United States) Northern Colorado Hailstorm FC	Out of Contract Move	January 6, 2022	
16	(Jamaica) Rashawn Dally	FW	(United States) Hartford Athletic	Out of Contract Move	January 13, 2022	
18	(Ghana) Dominic Oduro	MF	(United States) Charleston Battery	Out of Contract Move	January 19, 2022	
11	(Belize) Michael Salazar	FW	(United States) LA Galaxy II	Out of Contract Move	February 3, 2022	
19	(Trinidad and Tobago) Dre Fortune	MF	(Finland) Nõmme Kalju FC	Out of Contract Move	February 9, 2022	
11	(Ghana) Francis Atuahene	FW	(United States) Detroit City FC	Out of Contract Move	March 3, 2022	
22	(Uganda) Edward Kizza	FW	(United States) New England Revolution	Called Back from Loan	July 8, 2022	
49	(United States) Matt Brucker	FW	(United States) High Point University	Academy Contract End - Fall College Soccer	August 1, 2022	
33	(United States) Aaron O'Malley	MF	(United States) University of Massachusetts	Academy Contract End - Fall College Soccer	August 1, 2022	
45	(United States) Simeon Betapudi	FW	(United States) Belmont University	Academy Contract End - Fall College Soccer	August 1, 2022	
