= 2023 Memphis 901 FC season =

Soccer season

Memphis 901 FC
2023 season
- Head coach: Stephen Glass
- Stadium: AutoZone Park; Memphis, Tennessee
- USLC: Conference: 4th Overall: 9th
- USLC Playoffs: Eastern Quarterfinals
- U.S. Open Cup: Round of 32
- Highest home attendance: 4,001 (Mar 11 vs. Loudoun)
- Lowest home attendance: 2,264 (Sep 6 vs Tampa)
- Average home league attendance: 3,447
- Biggest win: MEM 5–1 MIA (Jun 3); MEM 4–0 TUL (Jun 21); MEM 4–0 ELP (Oct 7)
- Biggest defeat: PHX 6–0 MEM (Jul 1)
Home colours	Away colours

The 2023 Memphis 901 FC season was the fifth season for Memphis 901 FC in the USL Championship, the second-tier professional soccer league in the United States and Canada.

New head coach Stephen Glass had a rough start to the season with back to back 1-3 home losses. Memphis 901 FC found their rhythm though and went undefeated in the months of April, May, and June with a record of 8-0-4 (W-L-D). They hit a slump in July with 2 draws and 4 losses while being scored against 18 times. They finished the season with 52 from a record of 14–10–10. Their 52pts landed them in 4th place in the east and a home playoff match.

The playoffs began on October 21 as Memphis hosted Louisville City. 901 FC went up quick with a 32 second goal by Bruno Lapa - 2nd fastest in League history at the time. Louisville found the equalizer later that half as the game slowed down and went into overtime and then to penalties. Louisville went first, with both teams exchanging goals until the fifth Memphis player was unable to hit the back of the net. Memphis 901 FC ultimately came up short and their 2023 season came to a close.

== Players and staff ==
=== Final roster ===
As of October 20, 2023

No.	Pos.	Player	Nation
1	GK	USA	Drew Romig
3	DF	USA	Carson Vom Steeg
4	MF	USA	Emerson Hyndman
5	MF	ARG	Samuel Careaga (on loan from Lanús)
6	MF	IRL	Aaron Molloy
7	MF	BRA	Bruno Lapa
8	DF	BRA	Lucas Turci
9	MF	BRA	Luiz Fernando
10	FW	BRA	Rodrigo da Costa
11	MF	CIV	Laurent Kissiedou
14	DF	USA	Akeem O'Connor-Ward
15	FW	USA	Calvin Harrison
16	DF	USA	Graham Smith
18	MF	USA	Jeremy Kelly
19	DF	USA	Rece Buckmaster
20	FW	USA	Nighte Pickering
23	MF	TRI	Leston Paul
24	FW	JAM	Rashawn Dally
26	GK	USA	Aren Seeger
27	DF	TRI	Jelani Peters
32	GK	MEX	Richard Sánchez
14	DF	USA	Aiden McFadden (on loan from Atlanta)
15	DF	USA	Logan Haddad
77	FW	USA	Dylan Borczak

Signed to a USL academy contract

=== Staff ===
As of October 20, 2023

Technical staff
Sporting director	Tim Howard
Assistant sporting director	Caleb Patterson-Sewell
Head coach	Stephen Glass
Assistant coach	Mark Spalding
Assistant coach	Caleb Patterson-Sewell

== Competitions ==
=== USL Championship ===
==== Eastern Conference standings ====
Pos	Team	Pld	W	L	T	GF	GA	GD	Pts	Qualification
1	Pittsburgh Riverhounds SC (S)	34	19	5	10	50	29	+21	67	Playoffs
2	Tampa Bay Rowdies	34	19	9	6	60	39	+21	63	Playoffs
3	Charleston Battery	34	17	9	8	47	43	+4	59	Playoffs
4	Memphis 901 FC	34	14	10	10	59	53	+6	52	Playoffs
5	Louisville City FC	34	14	12	8	41	44	−3	50	Playoffs
6	Indy Eleven	34	13	11	10	46	38	+8	49	Playoffs
7	Birmingham Legion FC	34	14	16	4	44	53	−9	46	Playoffs
8	Detroit City FC	34	11	15	8	30	39	−9	41	Playoffs
9	Miami FC	34	11	15	8	43	44	−1	41	
10	FC Tulsa	34	10	15	9	43	55	−12	39	
11	Loudoun United FC	34	7	23	4	36	61	−25	25	
12	Hartford Athletic	34	4	24	6	40	79	−39	18	

Source: USL Championship Standings
Rules for classification: 1) head-to-head points; 2) head-to-head goal differential; 3) points-per game within conference; 4) total wins; 5) total goal differential; 6) total goals scored; 7) points earned against top four Conference finishers; 8) disciplinary points; 9) coin toss or drawing of lots
(S) Players' Shield winner

==== Match results ====
Win Draw Loss Upcoming fixture

Unless otherwise noted, all times in Central time

Mar 11 01	Memphis 901 FC	1–3	Loudoun United FC	Memphis, TN
4:00PM CDT	Kissiedou 37', (red card) 63'; Ward (yellow card) 41'; Fernando (yellow card) 47'; Smith (yellow card) 71'	Report	Williamson 8', (yellow card) 27'; Ryan 11', 90+4'; Armenakas (yellow card) 49'; Houssou (yellow card) 63'	Stadium: Autozone Park; Attendance: 4,001; Referee: Eric Tattersall

Mar 18 02	Memphis 901 FC	1–3	Pittsburgh Riverhounds SC	Memphis, TN
4:00PM CDT	Lapa 7', (yellow card) 38'; Ward (yellow card) 49'; Smith (yellow card) 65'; Turci (yellow card) 69'	Report	Dikwa 5', 39' (pen.), 71'; Biasi (yellow card) 64'; Ybarra (yellow card) 80'	Stadium: AutoZone Park; Attendance: 3,587; Referee: Serhiy Boyko

Mar 25 03	Oakland Roots SC	PP	Memphis 901 FC	Oakland, CA
9:00PM CDT		Report		Stadium: Laney College Football Stadium

Apr 01 04	Miami FC	1–1	Memphis 901 FC	Miami, Florida
6:00 PM CDT	Sorto (yellow card) 7'; Craig 13', (yellow card) 40'; Telfer (yellow card) 57'; Zendejas (yellow card) 74'; Akinyode (yellow card) 90+3'	Report	Goodrum (yellow card) 39'; Valot 80' (o.g.)	Stadium: Riccardo Silva Stadium; Attendance: 1,175; Referee: Elvis Osmanovic

Apr 15 05	Memphis 901 FC	2–2	Las Vegas Lights FC	Memphis, TN
7:00 PM CDT	Kelly 39'; Fernando 52'; Goodrum (yellow card) 90+1'	Report	Stauffer 15'; Bushue (yellow card) 26'; Jiménez (yellow card) 33'; Ledesma 78'	Stadium: AutoZone Park; Attendance: 3,734; Referee: Adam Kilpatrick

Apr 22 06	Rio Grande Valley FC Toros	0-3	Memphis 901 FC	Edinburg, TX
7:00 PM CDT	Benítez (yellow card) 14'; Kinzner (yellow card) 45+2'	Report	Lapa 29'; Ward (yellow card) 55'; Smith 64'; Smith (yellow card) 74'; Pickering 87'	Stadium: HEB Park; Attendance: 6,162; Referee: Gerald Flores

Apr 29 07	Memphis 901 FC	1–1	Louisville City	Memphis, TN
7:00 PM CDT	Fernando 52'	Report	Totsch 9'	Stadium: AutoZone Park; Attendance: 3,644; Referee: Matt Thompson

May 06 08	Hartford Athletic	0-2	Memphis 901 FC	Hartford, CT
6:00 PM CDT	Cedeño (yellow card) 19'; McGlynn (yellow card) 45+2'	Report	Kissiedou 32'; Dally 83'	Stadium: Trinity Health Stadium; Attendance: 5,500; Referee: Abdou Ndiaye

May 13 09	Memphis 901 FC	2-1	Colorado Springs Switchbacks	Memphis, TN
7:00 PM CDT	Fernando 10,89'; Lapa (red card); Smith (yellow card) 45+4'; Kelly (yellow card) 53'	Report	R. Williams 29'; D. Williams (yellow card) 32'; Henríquez (yellow card) 36'; Seagrist (yellow card) 57'; Chapman (yellow card) 86'	Stadium: AutoZone Park; Attendance: 3,450; Referee: Benjamin Meyer

May 19 10	FC Tulsa	1-2	Memphis 901 FC	Tulsa, OK
8:00P.M. CDT	Ferri (yellow card) 36'; Tetteh (yellow card) 38'; Gavin (yellow card) 55'; Epps (yellow card) 72'; Suárez 83'; Bourgeois (yellow card) 85'	Report	Pickering 54'; Molloy 65'; Goodrum (yellow card) 78'; Dally (yellow card) 90+2'; Hamid (yellow card) 90+3'	Stadium: ONEOK Field; Attendance: 4,577; Referee: Alejo Calume

Jun 03 11	Memphis 901 FC	5–1	Miami FC	Memphis, TN
7:30 PM CDT	Kelly 1'; Molloy 22' (pen.); Lapa 34' (pen.); Buckmaster (yellow card) 39'; Pickering (yellow card) 48', (goal) 76'; Peters (yellow card) 65' (yellow-red card) 79'; O'Connor-Ward 89'	Report	Akinyode (yellow card) 5' (yellow-red card) 49', (goal) 41'; Chapman-Page (yellow card) 20'; Pulis (yellow card) 23'	Stadium: AutoZone Park; Attendance: 3,672; Referee: Katja Koroleva

Jun 07 12	Birmingham Legion FC	PP	Memphis 901 FC	Birmingham, AL
7:00PM CDT				Stadium: Protective Stadium

Jun 10 13	Louisville City FC	1–3	Memphis 901 FC	Louisville, KY
8:00 PM	Damm (yellow card) 17'; Thellufsen (yellow card) 25'; Gibson (yellow card) 55'; Harris 71'	Report	Pickering 45+2'; Ward (yellow card) 60'; Damm 69' (o.g.); Glass (yellow card) 73'; da Costa 74'	Stadium: Lynn Family Stadium; Attendance: 10,706; Referee: Eric Tattersall

Jun 17 14	Memphis 901 FC	0–0	Detroit City FC	Memphis, TN
8:30 PM CDT	Turci (yellow card) 54'; Kelly (yellow card) 64'	Report	Fisher (yellow card) 33'; Rodriguez (yellow card) 45'; Simonsen (yellow card) 49'	Stadium: AutoZone Park; Attendance: 3,964; Referee: Joshua Encarnación

Jun 21 15	Memphis 901 FC	4-0	FC Tulsa	Memphis, TN
7:00P.M. CDT	da Costa 20'; Dally 25'; Hyndman 48'; Peters 68'; Turci (yellow card) 76'; Smith (yellow card) 85'	Report	Ruxi (yellow card) 6'; Bird (yellow card) 24'; Ferri (yellow card) 52'; Armour (yellow card) 70'	Stadium: AutoZone Park; Attendance: 3,008; Referee: Melvin Rivas

Jun 24 16	Memphis 901 FC	3–2	Charleston Battery	Memphis, TN
7:30 PM CDT		Report		Stadium: AutoZone Park; Attendance: 3,688; Referee: Gerald Flores

Jul 01 17	Phoenix Rising FC	6-0	Memphis 901 FC	Phoenix, AZ
9:30 PM CDT		Report		Stadium: Phoenix Rising Soccer Stadium; Attendance: 6,254; Referee: Brandon Stevis

Jul 07 18	Memphis 901 FC	0–4	San Antonio FC	Memphis, TN
7:30 PM CDT		Report		Stadium: AutoZone Park; Attendance: 3,623; Referee: Abdou Ndiaye

Jul 12 03	Oakland Roots SC	1-1	Memphis 901 FC	Hayward, CA
8:00 PM CDT		Report		Stadium: Pioneer Stadium; Attendance: 2,098; Referee: Ricardo Fierro

Jul 15 19	Sacramento Republic FC	1-1	Memphis 901 FC	Sacramento, CA
9:00 PM CDT		Report		Stadium: Heart Health Park; Attendance: 9,311; Referee: Matthew Thompson

Jul 22 20	Memphis 901 FC	3–4	Orange County SC	Memphis, TN
7:30 PM CDT		Report		Stadium: AutoZone Park; Attendance: 3,971; Referee: John Griggs

Jul 29 21	Pittsburgh Riverhounds SC	4-2	Memphis 901 FC	Pittsburgh, PA
6:00 PM CDT		Report		Stadium: Highmark Stadium; Attendance: 5,466; Referee: Elton García

Aug 02 22	Loudoun United	0-0	Memphis 901 FC	Leesburg, VA
10:00AM CDT	Rocha (yellow card) 56'; Zanne (yellow card) 67'; Koanda (yellow card) 70'	Report	Buckmaster (yellow card) 29'; Molloy (yellow card) 42'	Stadium: Segra Field; Attendance: 2,416; Referee: Thomas Snyder

Aug 05 23	Indy Eleven	1-2	Memphis 901 FC	Indianapolis, IN
6:00 PM CDT		Report		Stadium: Michael A. Carroll Stadium; Attendance: 9,194; Referee: Eric Tattersall

Aug 12 24	San Diego Loyal SC	0-1	Memphis 901 FC	San Diego, CA
8:00 PM CDT		Report		Stadium: Torero Stadium; Attendance: 4,524; Referee: Sergii Demianchuk

Aug 23 25	Memphis 901 FC	0–0	Indy Eleven	Memphis, TN
7:00 PM CDT		Report		Stadium: AutoZone Park; Attendance: 2,567; Referee: Elvis Osmanovic

Aug 26 26	Charleston Battery	1-0	Memphis 901 FC	Mt. Pleasant, SC
6:30 PM CDT		Report		Stadium: Patriots Point; Attendance: 4,004; Referee: Nabil Bensalah

Sep 02 27	Detroit City FC	1-1	Memphis 901 FC	Hamtramck, MI
6:30 PM CDT		Report		Stadium: Keyworth Stadium; Attendance: 6,266; Referee: Thomas Snyder

Sep 06 28	Memphis 901 FC	3-2	Tampa Bay Rowdies	Memphis, TN
7:00 PM CDT		Report		Stadium: AutoZone Park; Attendance: 2,264; Referee: Matthew Thompson

Sep 09 29	Memphis 901 FC	0–1	Monterey Bay FC	Memphis, TN
7:00 PM CDT		Report		Stadium: AutoZone Park; Attendance: 3,238; Referee: Abdou Ndiaye

Sep 16 30	Memphis 901 FC	4–2	Hartford Athletic	Memphis, TN
7:00 PM CDT		Report		Stadium: AutoZone Park; Attendance: 3,417; Referee: Luis Arroyo

Sep 20 12	Birmingham Legion FC	1–1	Memphis 901 FC	Birmingham, AL
7:00 PM CDT	Kasim 48'; Crognale (yellow card) 55'; Agudelo (yellow card) 90'	Report	McFadden 52'; Peters (yellow card) 71'	Stadium: Protective Stadium; Referee: Matthew Corrigan

Sep 23 31	Tampa Bay Rowdies	2-4	Memphis 901 FC	St. Petersburg, FL
6:30 PM CDT		Report		Stadium: Al Lang Stadium; Attendance: 5,862; Referee: Ricardo Fierro

Sep 30 32	Memphis 901 FC	1–2	Birmingham Legion FC	Memphis, TN
7:00 PM CDT	Molloy (yellow card) 13'; Ward (yellow card) 28'; Rodrigo 40' (pen.)	Report	Nwegbo 46'; Brett 51'; Martínez (yellow card) 57'; Agudelo (yellow card) 90+8'	Stadium: AutoZone Park; Referee: Alejo Calume

Oct 07 33	Memphis 901 FC	4–0	El Paso Locomotive FC	Memphis, TN
7:00 PM CDT		Report		Stadium: AutoZone Park; Attendance: 3,537; Referee: Calin Radosav

Oct 13 34	New Mexico United	4-1	Memphis 901 FC	Albuquerque, NM
8:00 PM CDT		Report		Stadium: Isotopes Park; Attendance: 11,385; Referee: Sergii Demianchuk

==== USL Playoffs ====
Oct 21 Quarter-finals	Memphis 901 FC	1–1 (a.e.t.) (4–5 p)	Louisville City FC	Memphis, Tennessee
6:30 PM CDT	Lapa 1'; Paul (yellow card) 24'; Ward (yellow card) 62'; Kissiedou (yellow card) 73'; Careaga (yellow card) 118'	Report	Lancaster 18'; Semmle (yellow card) 24'; Perez (yellow card) 90+5'; McCabe (yellow card) 117'	Stadium: AutoZone Park; Attendance: 3,587; Referee: Elton García
	Penalties
	Hyndman (penalty scored); Molloy (penalty scored); Smith (penalty scored); Careaga (penalty scored); McFadden (penalty missed)		(penalty scored) Totsch; (penalty scored) Harris; (penalty scored) Mares; (penalty scored) McCabe; (penalty scored) Jimenez

=== US Open Cup ===
Memphis 901 FC entered the 2022 US Open Cup in the 2nd round with the rest of the USLC teams.

Apr 4 USOC Rnd 2	One Knoxville SC	1–2 (a.e.t.)	Memphis 901 FC	Knoxville, TN
7:00PM CDT	Andreassen (yellow card) 9'; Ross (yellow card) 52'; Ilic 57'; Kelly-Rosales (yellow card) 76'; Waldeck (yellow card) 90'	Report	Kelly (yellow card) 13'; Borczak 38'; Goodrum (yellow card) 45+2'; Smith (yellow card) 74'; Peters (yellow card) 120+1'; Kelly 120+4'	Stadium: Regal Stadium; Attendance: 1,812; Referee: Matthew Thompson

Apr 26 USOC Rnd 3	Atlanta United FC	1–2 (a.e.t.)	Memphis 901 FC	Kennesaw, GA
7:30PM CDT	Wolff 3' (yellow card) 59'; Abram (yellow card) 28'; Araújo (yellow card) 45+2'; Fortune (yellow card) 71'	Report	Kelly (yellow card) 23'; Goodrum 90+6'; Pickering 100'; Hamid (yellow card) 120+2'	Stadium: Fifth Third Bank Stadium; Attendance: 3,034; Referee: Aleksandar Zhelyazkov

May 10 USOC Rnd 4	Birmingham Legion FC	3-0	Memphis 901 FC	Birmingham, AL
8:00PM CDT	Agudelo 20'; Martínez 39'; Pasher 64'; Kavita (yellow card) 80'	Report	Ward (yellow card) 14'; Vom Steeg (yellow card) 90+1'	Stadium: Protective Stadium; Attendance: 3,150; Referee: Lorenzo Hernandez

== Stats ==
Regular Season
No.	Player Name	Pos.	Apps	Sta.	M	G	A	Booked	(yellow card) (yellow-red card)	Sent off (straight red)
6	(Republic of Ireland) Aaron Molloy	MF	33	33	2917	2	8	10	0	0
37	(United States) Aiden McFadden	DF	12	12	1069	1	3	3	0	0
14	(United States) Akeem Ward	DF	34	33	2951	3	2	8	0	0
26	(United States) Aren Seeger	GK	0	0	0	0	0	0	0	0
21	(United States) Bill Hamid	GK	10	10	900	0	0	1	0	0
7	(Brazil) Bruno Lapa	MF	28	19	1491	4	4	3	0	2
15	(United States) Calvin Harrison	FW	1	0	4	0	0	0	0	0
3	(United States) Carson Vom Steeg	DF	19	15	1317	1	0	2	0	0
1	(United States) Drew Romig	GK	22	22	1980	0	0	0	0	0
77	(United States) Dylan Borczak	FW	25	6	586	0	1	0	0	0
4	(United States) Emerson Hyndman	MF	14	7	688	3	0	2	0	0
28	(United States) Farid Chouyouti	FW	0	0	0	0	0	0	0	0
16	(United States) Graham Smith	DF	29	28	2557	1	1	11	1	0
27	(Trinidad and Tobago) Jelani Peters	DF	18	15	1357	1	0	4	1	0
18	(United States) Jeremy Kelly	FW	33	33	2830	3	1	2	1	0
11	(Ivory Coast) Laurent Kissiedou	MF	27	21	1723	6	4	1	0	1
23	(Trinidad and Tobago) Leston Paul	MF	16	11	1020	0	1	2	0	0
8	(Brazil) Lucas Turci	DF	27	16	1613	2	1	3	0	0
9	(Brazil) Luiz Fernando Nascimento	FW	27	24	2056	8	4	1	0	0
35	(United States) Nick Dyer	DF	0	0	0	0	0	0	0	0
20	(United States) Nighte Pickering	FW	30	9	979	4	3	3	0	0
10	(United States) Phillip Goodrum	FW	9	8	715	0	0	3	0	0
24	(Jamaica) Rashawn Dally	FW	29	6	785	3	2	1	0	0
19	(United States) Rece Buckmaster	DF	20	20	1776	1	1	4	0	0
32	(Mexico) Richard Sánchez	GK	2	2	180	0	0	0	0	0
10	(Brazil) Rodrigo da Costa	MF	25	23	1943	12	3	-	0	0
5	(Argentina) Samuel Careaga	MF	6	1	218	2	1	-	0	0
55	(Colombia) Sebastián Velásquez	MF	1	0	13	0	0	0	0	0
