= Laurent Kissiedou =

Ivorian footballer (born 1998)

Personal information
- Date of birth: 22 December 1998 (age 27)
- Place of birth: Divo, Ivory Coast
- Height: 1.73 m (5 ft 8 in)
- Position: Midfielder

Team information
- Current team: Charleston Battery

Youth career
- 2016–2017: Atlanta United

Senior career*
Years	Team	Apps	(Gls)
2017	Charleston Battery	1	(0)
2018–2019	Atlanta United 2	46	(4)
2021–2023	Memphis 901	95	(21)
2024–2025	Pardubice	24	(0)
2024	→ Detroit City (loan)	10	(2)
2025	→ FK Příbram (loan)	8	(0)
2026–	Charleston Battery	24	(2)
- * Club domestic league appearances and goals as of 12:15, 4 November 2026 (UTC)

Laurent Kissiedou (born 22 December 1998) is an Ivorian footballer who plays as a midfielder for Charleston Battery in the USL Championship.

He has obtained a United States green card so he will count as a domestic player according to MLS rules.

== Youth career ==
While a member of Atlanta United Academy's U-18 team in 2016, Kissiedou scored 7 goals.

== Club career ==
=== Charleston Battery ===
On 26 August 2017, Kissiedou made his debut for the Charleston Battery in a 1–3 loss to the Richmond Kickers.

In January 2026, Kissiedou returned to Charleston to sign a multi-year contract with the Battery ahead of the USL Championship season.

=== Atlanta United 2 ===
On February 18, 2018, Kissiedou joined Atlanta United 2.

=== Memphis 901 FC ===
Kissiedou's breakout as a professional came during his time at Memphis 901 FC from 2021 to 2023, with his first two seasons in Memphis under Head Coach Ben Pirmann.

In his debut season for Memphis 901 FC, Kissiedou made 30 starts, logging four goals and five assists. During his three years at Memphis, Kissiedou recorded 16 goals, 14 assists, and 103 chances across 90 matches. He also reunites with former Memphis teammates Chris Allen, Jeremy Kelly, and Graham Smith in Charleston.

Kissiedou has appeared in the USL Championship Team of the Week several times, including Weeks 7, 24 and 28.

In Week 24 of the USL Championship season, Kissiedou was named the league's Player of the Week. He scored 2 goals to help Memphis 901 FC in a 3–0 win over FC Tulsa.

On January 10, 2022, Kissiedou re-signed with Memphis 901 FC for the 2022 season. He left Memphis following the 2023 season.

=== Detroit City ===
In August 2024, Kissiedou returned to the United States, joining USL Championship club Detroit City on loan from FK Pardubice for the remainder of the 2024 season.
