= Trey Muse =

American soccer player (born 1999)

Personal information
- Full name: John David Muse III
- Date of birth: July 26, 1999 (age 27)
- Place of birth: Louisville, Kentucky, United States
- Height: 6 ft 4 in (1.93 m)
- Position: Goalkeeper

Team information
- Current team: Portland Timbers
- Number: 25

Youth career
- 2015–2017: Seattle Sounders FC

College career
Years	Team	Apps	(Gls)
2017–2018	Indiana Hoosiers	49	(0)

Senior career*
Years	Team	Apps	(Gls)
2017	Seattle Sounders FC 2	0	(0)
2018	Derby City Rovers	2	(0)
2019–2021	Seattle Sounders FC	0	(0)
2019–2020	→ Tacoma Defiance (loan)	24	(0)
2021	→ San Diego Loyal (loan)	15	(0)
2022	Loudoun United	0	(0)
2022	→ Memphis 901 (loan)	30	(0)
2023–2024	Charleston Battery	33	(0)
2024–	Portland Timbers	0	(0)
2024–	Portland Timbers 2	0	(0)

International career^{‡}
2017	United States U18	2	(0)
2018–2019	United States U20	1	(0)
- * Club domestic league appearances and goals as of January 5, 2024 ‡ National team caps and goals as of March 25, 2019

Trey Muse (born July 26, 1999) is an American professional soccer player who plays as a goalkeeper for Major League Soccer club Portland Timbers.

== Career ==
=== College and amateur ===
Muse began his youth career with Derby City Rovers before joining the Seattle Sounders FC Academy in 2015 while attending Roosevelt High School. Muse made 32 starts for the Sounders Academy over two seasons and he helped guide the Sounders U-18s to a third-place finish in the 2017 USSDA playoffs. During this time Muse was a member of the U.S. U18 Men's National Team. After high school graduation in 2017 Muse went on to Indiana University. In his freshman season he was named to the Big Ten Conference All-Freshman Team and was the goalkeeper for the runner-up team in the NCAA College Cup. Muse led the NCAA in goals against average (0.26), shutouts (18) and save percentage (90.3 percent). In his sophomore season as part of the Big Ten Championship team and he was named Big Ten Goalkeeper of the Year and was a MAC Hermann semifinalist.

=== Professional ===
==== Seattle Sounders FC ====
On January 15, 2019, Muse signed the 11th homegrown player contract with Seattle Sounders FC. Following the 2021 season, Seattle declined their contract option on Muse.

==== San Diego Loyal (loan) ====
On February 2, 2021, Muse joined USL Championship side San Diego Loyal on loan for the 2021 season.

==== Loudoun United ====
On January 28, 2022, Muse signed with USL Championship side Loudoun United.

==== Memphis 901 (loan) ====
On March 11, 2022, Muse was loaned to USL Championship side Memphis 901.

=== Charleston Battery ===
On December 29, 2022, Muse joined USL Championship side Charleston Battery for their 2023 season, reuniting head coach Ben Pirmann. Muse's first season in Charleston proved to be a stellar one. The shot-stopper notched a new career-high with 12 clean sheets in the regular season, a mark that also ranked tied for most in the league. Muse was a 2x Player of the Week selection, both coming in the month of May, and a three-time Team of the Week selection. He had the ninth-most saves (75) and started 33 of the 34 regular season matches. He ended the year with 13 clean sheets, adding to his career-high with one shutout in the playoffs, and helped the Battery reach the USL Championship Final.

=== Portland Timbers ===
After Muse's contract option was exercised by the Battery in December 2023, he was transferred from Charleston to the Portland Timbers of Major League Soccer on January 5, 2024. Charleston received an undisclosed fee from Portland for the transfer.

== Honors ==
Seattle Sounders FC

- MLS Cup: 2019

Charleston Battery

- Eastern Conference Champion (Playoffs): 2023

Individual

- 2015-2016 USDA Western Conference U-15/16 Goalkeeper of the Year
- 2016-2017 USDA Western Conference Goalkeeper of the Year and Western Conference Player of the Year
- 2017 Second-Team All-Big Ten and Big Ten All-Freshman Team
- 2017 Top Drawer Soccer First-Team Freshman Best XI
- 2017 College Soccer News All-Freshman First Team
- 2017 NCAA College Cup All-Tournament Team
- 2018 MAC Hermann Trophy Semifinalist
- 2018 Big Ten Goalkeeper of the Year and First-Team All-Big Ten
- 2018 First-Team All-America by United Soccer Coaches
- 2018 First-Team Best XI by Top Drawer Soccer
- 2018 First-Team All-America by College Soccer News

== Personal life ==
Muse is the son of Dave Muse, a former goalkeeper for the University of Kentucky, and Rachel Hall and has two siblings, Houston and Alexis.
