= Jeremy Kelly =

American soccer player (born 1997)

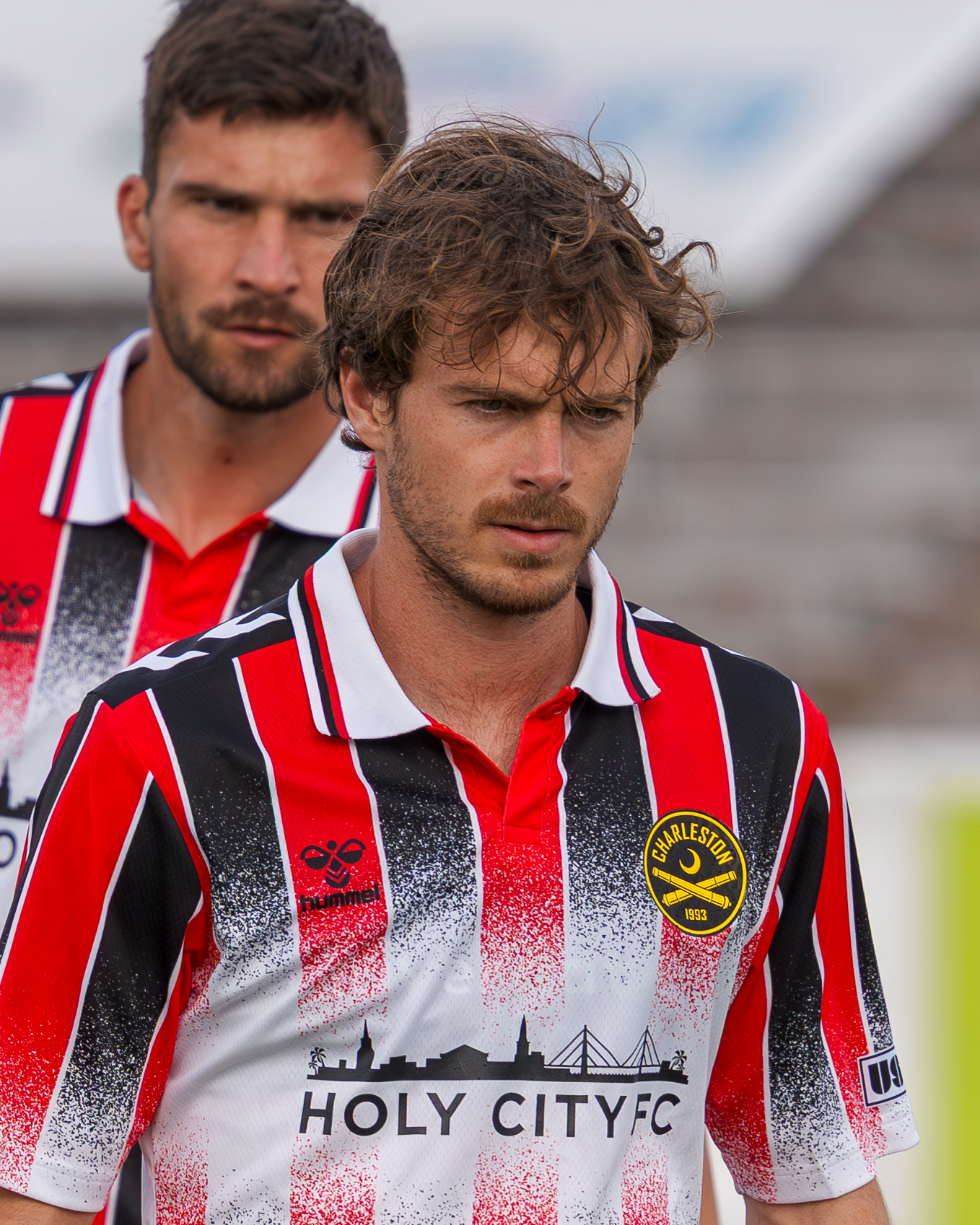
- Kelly with Charleston Battery in 2026

Personal information
- Date of birth: October 21, 1997 (age 29)
- Place of birth: Prague, Czech Republic
- Height: 1.75 m (5 ft 9 in)
- Positions: Defender; midfielder

Team information
- Current team: Charleston Battery
- Number: 29

Youth career
- 2003–2008: Racing Club de Fontainebleau
- 2008–2012: Triangle United
- 2013–2016: Carolina RailHawks

College career
Years	Team	Apps	(Gls)
2016–2019	North Carolina Tar Heels	79	(0)

Senior career*
Years	Team	Apps	(Gls)
2016	Carolina RailHawks	1	(0)
2018	San Francisco City	3	(0)
2019	North Carolina FC U23	5	(0)
2020–2021	Colorado Rapids	8	(0)
2021	→ Phoenix Rising (loan)	5	(0)
2022–2023	Memphis 901	67	(11)
2024	FC Tulsa	0	(0)
2024–2025	Crawley Town	55	(4)
2025–	Charleston Battery	41	(3)

International career^{‡}
2016	United States U20	2	(1)
- * Club domestic league appearances and goals as of November 4, 2026 ‡ National team caps and goals as of December 22, 2016

Jeremy Kelly (born October 21, 1997) is an American professional soccer player who plays as a defender for USL Championship club Charleston Battery.

== Youth ==
Kelly signed an amateur contract with Carolina RailHawks on March 17, 2016. His amateur status would allow him to play college soccer for North Carolina Tar Heels when their college season began later in the year.

Kelly played four years at UNC, starting 59 of his 79 appearances and tallying one goals and 2 assists. Kelly was an obstacle to the UNC's midfield en route to consecutive NCAA College Cup appearances. He was a second-team All-ACC selection in his senior year.

== Professional ==
=== Colorado Rapids ===
On January 9, 2020, Kelly was selected ninth overall in the 2020 MLS SuperDraft by Montreal Impact. His rights were then immediately traded to Colorado Rapids in exchange for $75,000 of General Allocation Money and the Rapids natural first round selection.

On February 25, 2020, the Rapids officially announced the signing of Kelly to an initial one-year contract. He made his MLS debut against Real Salt Lake in the MLS is Back Tournament on July 12, 2020. Kelly recorded his first career assist during a 5–0 win versus Real Salt Lake on Sept. 12. He finished his rookie season with one assist in 246 minutes played across eight appearances at right back, two of them starts. In March 2021, Kelly joined Phoenix Rising FC on loan for the 2021 season.

On July 1, 2021, Kelly was recalled from loan by the Rapids. Following the 2021 season, Colorado opted to decline their contract option on Kelly.

=== Memphis 901 ===
On February 18, 2022, he signed with USL Championship club Memphis 901. He left Memphis following the 2023 season.

=== Crawley Town ===
Kelly joined FC Tulsa on January 5, 2024, but Kelly and Tulsa mutually agreed on a termination of his contract a month later. On February 1, 2024, Kelly signed for EFL League Two club Crawley Town on a deal until summer 2024. He made his debut for the club as a substitute in a 1–0 defeat to Crewe Alexandra on February 10. Kelly appeared in all three of Crawley's League Two play-off matches at the end of the 2023–24 as Crawley were promoted to League One after a 2–0 victory over Crewe Alexandra in the final.

=== Charleston Battery ===
On June 25, 2025, it was announced Kelly would return to the United States and join USL Championship side Charleston Battery on a multi-year deal, reuniting him with former Memphis manager Ben Pirmann in Charleston.

== International ==
Kelly was named to Tab Ramos' U.S. U-20 squad for camp and two friendlies against New York Cosmos and New York Red Bulls II in July 2016. Kelly scored in stoppage time to defeat NYRBII.

Kelly was born in Prague in the Czech Republic, and lived in France until he was 10 years old. He later moved to North Carolina.

== Career statistics ==
As of end of 2024–25 season

Appearances and goals by club, season and competition
Club	Season	League			National Cup (Note: Includes US Open Cup, FA Cup)		League Cup (Note: Includes EFL Cup)		Other		Total	
Club	Season	Division	Apps	Goals	Apps	Goals	Apps	Goals	Apps	Goals	Apps	Goals
Carolina RailHawks	2016	NASL	1	0	1	0	—		—		2	0
San Francisco City	2018	USL PDL	3	0	—		—		—		3	0
North Carolina FC U23	2019	USL League Two	5	2	—		—		—		5	2
Colorado Rapids	2020	Major League Soccer	8	0	—		—		—		8	0
Colorado Rapids	2021	Major League Soccer	0	0	—		—		—		0	0
Colorado Rapids	Total		8	0	0	0	0	0	0	0	8	0
Phoenix Rising FC (loan)	2021	USL Championship	5	0	—		—		—		5	0
Memphis 901	2022	USL Championship	34	8	1	0	—		2 (Note: Appearance(s) in USL Championship Playoffs)	0	37	8
Memphis 901	2023	USL Championship	33	3	3	1	—		1	0	37	4
Memphis 901	Total		67	11	4	1	0	0	3	0	74	12
Crawley Town	2023–24	EFL League Two	18	1	—		—		3 (Note: Appearance(s) in EFL League Two play-offs)	0	21	1
Crawley Town	2024–25	EFL League One	37	3	2	1	2	0	3 (Note: Appearance(s) in EFL Trophy)	0	44	4
Crawley Town	Total		55	4	2	1	2	0	6	0	65	5
Career total			144	17	7	2	2	0	9	0	162	19

== Honors ==
Crawley Town

- EFL League Two play-offs: 2024
