= Tycho Collins =

Chinese footballer

Personal information
- Full name: Tycho Lawson Collins
- Date of birth: October 20, 2001 (age 25)
- Place of birth: Shanghai, China
- Height: 1.73 m (5 ft 8 in)
- Positions: Winger; fullback

Team information
- Current team: NK Rudar Velenje

Youth career
- 2013–2015: Lobos Rush
- 2018–2019: Team Boca

College career
| Years | Team | Apps | (Gls) |
| 2022 | Florida Atlantic Owls | 1 | (0) |

Senior career*
| Years | Team | Apps | (Gls) |
| 2021 | Memphis 901 | 2 | (0) |
| 2023 | Miami AC | 12 | (4) |
| 2024 | Rudar Velenje | 1 | (1) |
- * Club domestic league appearances and goals as of November 5, 2021

Tycho Lawson Collins (Chinese: 周第谷; pinyin: Zhōu Dìgǔ; born October 20, 2001) is a Chinese-American footballer who plays as a forward for 2. SNL club Rudar Velenje.

== Career ==
=== Youth ===
Born in Shanghai, China, Collins also spent part of his childhood in Memphis, Tennessee with Lobo Rush between 2013 and 2015, winning two state titles.

In 2015, Collins moved overseas where he trialed and played in exhibition matches for clubs across three different countries. Starting with Shanghai SIPG, Collins would also spend various periods training with Chelsea in England, VVV-Venlo in the Netherlands and Shanghai Shenhua, also in China.

After a return trial with Shanghai SIPG during the summer of 2019, Collins returned to the United States where he finished high school in Boca Raton, Florida. He also spent time with club side Team Boca. After graduating in 2020, Collins trained for six months with Houston Dynamo.

On May 14, 2021, Collins signed with USL Championship side Memphis 901 on an academy contract, allowing him to remain eligible to play college soccer. He made his debut on June 5, appearing as an injury-time substitute during a 2–1 win over Indy Eleven.

Collins attended Florida Atlantic University to play college soccer in 2022, he made 1 appearance for the Owls before deciding to go back and play professionally.
