= Aaron Molloy =

Irish soccer player (born 1997)

Personal information
- Date of birth: 11 January 1997 (age 29)
- Place of birth: Dublin, Ireland
- Height: 5 ft 11 in (1.80 m)
- Position: Midfielder

Team information
- Current team: Lexington SC
- Number: 6

Youth career
- 2014–2015: Bohemians

College career
| Years | Team | Apps | (Gls) |
| 2016 | Keiser Seahawks | 15 | (4) |
| 2017–2019 | Penn State Nittany Lions | 50 | (14) |

Senior career*
| Years | Team | Apps | (Gls) |
| 2016 | Drogheda United | 13 | (2) |
| 2016–2018 | Reading United | 26 | (12) |
| 2020 | Portland Timbers 2 | 15 | (1) |
| 2021 | Forward Madison | 27 | (4) |
| 2022–2023 | Memphis 901 | 66 | (10) |
| 2024–2025 | Charleston Battery | 56 | (4) |
| 2026– | Lexington SC | 27 | (5) |
- * Club domestic league appearances and goals as of 11:23, 9 November 2026 (UTC)

Aaron Molloy (born 11 January 1997) is an Irish professional footballer who plays as a midfielder for the Lexington SC in the USL Championship.

== Youth and college ==
Molloy played for the Bohemians academy for the 2014–15 season, as well as a short season in 2015 where he served as captain. He received the Bohemians U19 player of the year award for the 2014–15 season.

=== College ===
After a season with Drogheda United in Ireland, Molloy decided to move to the United States to play college soccer. He played and started in 15 matches as a freshman at Keiser University, recording his first appearance against Texas Wesleyan on 9 September 2016 and scoring his first goal at St. Thomas on 19 October. Molloy earned Sun Conference Freshman of the Year and second-team All-Conference honors.

In his first season at Penn State, Molloy appeared in 16 matches. He made his Nittany Lions debut against Hofstra on 25 August 2017 and scored his first goal at UC Irvine on 1 September. In his junior season, Molloy was a team captain and appeared in 15 matches. He earned Big Ten preseason honors, All-Big Ten second team and United Soccer Coaches All-North Region third-team. In his senior season, Molloy was again a team captain and appeared in 19 matches.

== Club career ==
The first senior appearance for Molloy was for Irish club Drogheda United, where in 2016 he played in 13 matches and scored two goals. After the season, Molloy paused his professional career and went to the United States to play college soccer for Keiser University and Penn State University. Molloy began playing with the Philadelphia Union's Premier Development League affiliate Reading United AC in 2016, appearing with the club for three seasons. He was named the PDL Young Player of the Year in 2017.

Molloy was invited to the 2020 MLS Combine, and was subsequently drafted by Portland Timbers with the 16th pick of the 2020 MLS SuperDraft. Molloy signed with Portland Timbers 2 in the USL Championship, the club that serves as a reserve squad for the Portland Timbers. Molloy made his Timbers debut on 18 July 2020, starting in a 3–0 loss to Tacoma Defiance.

On February 17, 2021, Molloy signed with USL League One club Forward Madison FC.

On January 11, 2022, Molloy moved to USL Championship side Memphis 901. He left Memphis following the 2023 season.

Molloy signed a multi-year contract with the Charleston Battery in December 2023.

== Career statistics ==
As of 6 March 2026

| Club | Season | League | | | National Cup (Note: All appearances in the U.S. Open Cup) | | League Cup | | Other (Note: All appearances in league playoffs) | | Total | |
| Club | Season | Division | Apps | Goals | Apps | Goals | Apps | Goals | Apps | Goals | Apps | Goals |
|---|---|---|---|---|---|---|---|---|---|---|---|---|
| Drogheda United | 2016 | League of Ireland Premier Division | 13 | 2 | 0 | 0 | 0 | 0 | 0 | 0 | 13 | 2 |
| Reading United | 2016 | PDL | 2 | 1 | 0 | 0 | — | | 1 | 1` | 3 | 2 |
| Reading United | 2017 | PDL | 11 | 7 | 2 | 0 | — | | 1 | 1 | 14 | 8 |
| Reading United | 2018 | PDL | 13 | 4 | 2 | 0 | — | | 4 | 1 | 19 | 5 |
| Reading United | Total | | 26 | 12 | 4 | 0 | 0 | 0 | 6 | 3 | 36 | 15 |
| Portland Timbers 2 | 2020 | USL Championship | 15 | 1 | — | | — | | 0 | 0 | 15 | 1 |
| Forward Madison | 2021 | USL League One | 27 | 4 | — | | — | | — | | 27 | 4 |
| Memphis 901 | 2022 | USL Championship | 33 | 8 | 1 | 0 | — | | 2 | 0 | 36 | 8 |
| Memphis 901 | 2023 | USL Championship | 33 | 2 | 3 | 0 | — | | 1 | 0 | 37 | 2 |
| Memphis 901 | Total | | 66 | 10 | 4 | 0 | 0 | 0 | 3 | 0 | 73 | 10 |
| Charleston Battery | 2024 | USL Championship | 27 | 2 | 2 | 0 | — | | 1 | 0 | 30 | 2 |
| Charleston Battery | 2025 | USL Championship | 30 | 2 | 2 | 0 | 3 | 0 | 1 | 0 | 33 | 2 |
| Lexington SC | 2026 | USL Championship | 1 | 1 | — | | — | | — | | 1 | 1 |
| Career total | | | 205 | 34 | 10 | 0 | 0 | 0 | 10 | 2 | 228 | 37 |

== Personal life ==
Molloy is the son of Trevor Molloy, a fellow Irish footballer who played for teams in Ireland. Molloy studied for a Bachelor of Science degree in recreation, park, and tourism management from the College of Health and Human Development at Penn State.

== Awards ==
- PDL Young Player of the Year
- Big Ten Midfielder of the Year
- All-Big Ten first team
- All-Big Ten second team
- TopDrawerSoccer 2019 Best XI First Team
- United Soccer Coaches All-North Region First Team
- United Soccer Coaches All-America Second Team.
- United Soccer Coaches All-North Region third-team member
- Sun Conference Freshman of the Year
- All-Sun Conference second team
- 3x USL Championship All-League First Team: 2022, 2023, 2024
