= Jackson Brady =

New Zealand footballer

Personal information
- Full name: Jackson Brady
- Date of birth: 30 July 1997 (age 29)
- Place of birth: Blenheim, New Zealand
- Height: 1.74 m (5 ft 9 in)
- Position: Right-back

Youth career
- –2013: Coastal Spirit
- 2013−2015: Canterbury United

College career
Years	Team	Apps	(Gls)
2017	Memphis Tigers	16	(1)
2018	SLCC Bruins	18	(1)
2019−2021	Cal Poly Mustangs	30	(0)

Senior career*
Years	Team	Apps	(Gls)
2013–2017	Coastal Spirit		
2013–2015	Canterbury United	1	(0)
2018	Nomads United		
2019	Christchurch United		
2022	Memphis 901	4	(0)
2023	Chattanooga Red Wolves	4	(0)

International career^{‡}
2019	New Zealand U23	3	(0)
- * Club domestic league appearances and goals as of 16 October 2023 ‡ National team caps and goals as of 30 August 2022

Jackson Brady (born 30 July 1997) is a professional New Zealand footballer who plays as a right-back.
