= Mitchell Myers =

American soccer player

Personal information
- Date of birth: July 15, 1999 (age 27)
- Place of birth: Aiken, South Carolina, United States
- Height: 1.80 m (5 ft 11 in)
- Position: Defender

Youth career
- –2017: CESA

College career
Years	Team	Apps	(Gls)
2017–2019	South Carolina Gamecocks	34	(3)
2020–2021	Wofford Terriers	16	(2)

Senior career*
Years	Team	Apps	(Gls)
2019–2021	South Carolina United	9	(1)
2022	Memphis 901	3	(0)
- * Club domestic league appearances and goals as of October 19, 2022

Mitchell Myers (born July 15, 1999) is an American soccer player who plays as a defender.

== Career ==
=== Early career ===
Myers attended South Aiken High School, where he was a four-time all-region selection for his high school squad, earned all-state honors twice, and led team to lower state championship game. Myers also playing club soccer for the Carolina Elite Soccer Academy, where he was a part of three state championship teams.

In 2017, Myers attended the University of South Carolina to play college soccer. Myers did not play during the 2019 season, but across the 2017 and 2018 season, Myers made 34 appearances, scoring three goals and tallying six assists. He was named Third Team All-Conference USA in 2018.

In 2020, Myers transferred to Wofford College, missing the 2020–21 season due to injury, but made 16 appearances in 2021, scoring two goals and leading the team with seven assists. Myers also earned All-SoCon First Team honors.

While at college, Myers was part of the South Carolina United team who competed in the USL League Two, making nine regular season appearances and scoring a single goal in 2019. Myers was part of the team in 2021, but didn't make an appearance.

=== Professional ===
On February 9, 2022, Myers signed with USL Championship side Memphis 901. He made his professional debut on March 12, 2022, appearing as a 77th–minute substitute during a 0–3 loss to Pittsburgh Riverhounds.
