= Niall Logue =

Northern Irish footballer

Personal information
- Date of birth: 7 August 1995 (age 31)
- Place of birth: Derry, Northern Ireland
- Height: 6 ft 4 in (1.93 m)
- Position: Defender

Youth career
- 2010–2014: Institute

College career
Years	Team	Apps	(Gls)
2014–2015	Yavapai Roughriders		
2016–2017	Ohio State Buckeyes	37	(2)

Senior career*
Years	Team	Apps	(Gls)
2018	Derry City	4	(0)
2018	→ Finn Harps (loan)	6	(0)
2019	Finn Harps	17	(1)
2020	FC Tucson	16	(0)
2021	El Paso Locomotive	0	(0)
2021	→ Memphis 901 (loan)	21	(0)
2022	Memphis 901	24	(0)
2023	Hartford Athletic	20	(0)
2024	Oakland Roots	26	(1)
- * Club domestic league appearances and goals as of 31 October 2024

Niall Logue (born 7 August 1995) is a Northern Irish footballer who plays as a defender.

== Playing career ==
=== Youth & United States ===
Logue played for four years at Institute. Logue then moved to the United States in 2014 to play college soccer at Yavapai College in Arizona, where he played for two years before transferring to Ohio State University.

=== Derry City & Finn Harps ===
On 21 February 2018, Logue joined League of Ireland Premier Division side Derry City. He spent part of the 2018 season on loan to Finn Harps before joining them permanently ahead of their 2019 season.

=== FC Tucson ===
Logue returned to the United States in 2020 to join USL League One side FC Tucson.

=== El Paso Locomotive ===
On 10 December 2020, it was announced that Logue would join USL Championship side El Paso Locomotive ahead of their 2021 season.

==== Loan to Memphis 901 ====
On 30 June 2021, Logue moved on loan to USL Championship side Memphis 901 for the rest of the 2021 season.

=== Permanent move to Memphis 901 ===
On 7 January 2022, Logue signed on a permanent deal with Memphis 901.

=== Hartford Athletic ===
It was announced on 16 December 2022 that Logue would join USL Championship side Hartford Athletic for the 2023 season.

=== Oakland Roots SC ===
On 10 January 2024, Oakland Roots announced that Logue signed with them for their upcoming 2024 season.

Following the 2024 season, Oakland declined Logue's contract option.
