= Drew Romig =

American soccer player (born 1998)

Personal information
- Full name: Andrew Romig
- Date of birth: March 25, 1998 (age 28)
- Place of birth: Midlothian, Virginia, United States
- Height: 6 ft 0 in (1.83 m)
- Position: Goalkeeper

Youth career
- 2006–2014: Richmond Kickers

College career
Years	Team	Apps	(Gls)
2016–2019	North Carolina Tar Heels	8	(0)

Senior career*
Years	Team	Apps	(Gls)
2014–2015	Richmond Kickers	1	(0)
2017	Wilmington Hammerheads	12	(0)
2018	San Francisco City	4	(0)
2021	South Georgia Tormenta 2	10	(0)
2022–2023	Memphis 901	24	(0)
2024	South Georgia Tormenta	8	(0)
2025	Charlotte Independence	0	(0)
- * Club domestic league appearances and goals as of August 18, 2025

Andrew Romig (born March 25, 1998) is an American retired professional soccer player who played as a goalkeeper.

== Club career ==
Romig signed with United Soccer League club Richmond Kickers in 2014.

In 2016, Romig went to play college soccer at the University of North Carolina at Chapel Hill. In four seasons with the Tar Heels, Romig made 8 appearances.

During his time at college, Romig played in the USL PDL with Wilmington Hammerheads and San Francisco City.

In 2021, Romig played with USL League Two side South Georgia Tormenta 2.

On March 7, 2022, Romig signed with USL Championship club Memphis 901 ahead of their 2022 season. He left Memphis following the 2023 season.

Romig joined Charlotte Independence in USL League One on February 7, 2025. Romig retired from professional soccer in August 2025.
