= Rece Buckmaster =

American soccer player (born 1996)

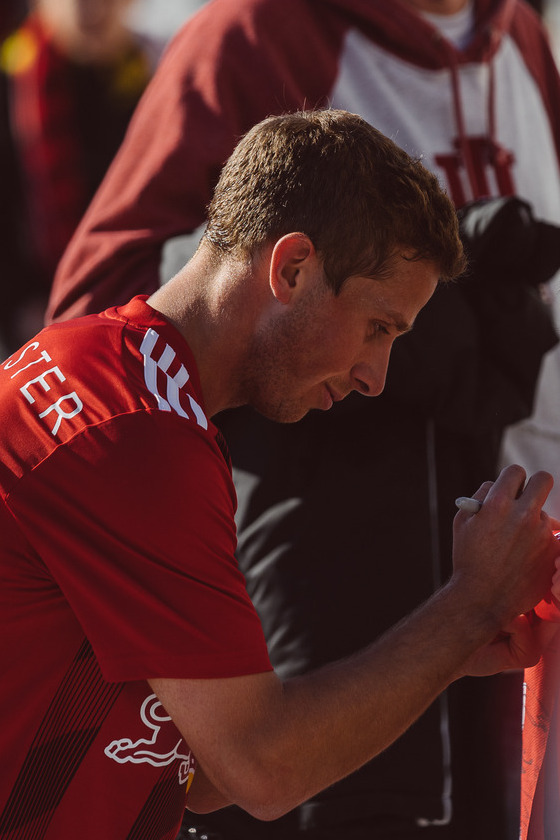

Personal information
- Date of birth: July 7, 1996 (age 30)
- Place of birth: Auburn, Indiana, United States
- Height: 5 ft 8 in (1.73 m)
- Positions: Defender; midfielder

Team information
- Current team: San Antonio FC
- Number: 23

College career
| Years | Team | Apps | (Gls) |
| 2015–2018 | Indiana Hoosiers | 82 | (5) |

Senior career*
| Years | Team | Apps | (Gls) |
| 2016 | Chicago FC United | 13 | (1) |
| 2019 | New York Red Bulls II | 18 | (0) |
| 2019–2020 | New York Red Bulls | 6 | (0) |
| 2020 | Memphis 901 | 14 | (1) |
| 2021 | Indy Eleven | 23 | (0) |
| 2022–2023 | Memphis 901 | 53 | (2) |
| 2024 | Hartford Athletic | 8 | (0) |
| 2024– | San Antonio FC | 42 | (1) |
- * Club domestic league appearances and goals as of November 10, 2026

Rece Buckmaster (born July 7, 1996) is an American soccer player who plays for San Antonio FC in the USL Championship.

== Career ==
=== Youth and college ===
Buckmaster attended Canterbury High School. Buckmaster played four years of college soccer at Indiana University between 2015 and 2018, making 82 appearances, scoring 5 goals and tallying 12 assists.

While at college, Buc appeared for USL Premier Development League side Chicago FC United in 2016.

=== Professional ===
On January 11, 2019, Buckmaster was selected 32nd overall in the 2019 MLS SuperDraft by New York Red Bulls. On March 5, 2019, Buckmaster signed for the Red Bulls' USL Championship affiliate side New York Red Bulls II. On March 9, 2019, he made his professional debut with the club, appearing as a starter in a 3–1 victory over Swope Park Rangers.

On August 3, 2019, Buckmaster moved to the New York Red Bulls senior squad. Buckmaster made his debut for the first team on the same day, playing all 90 minutes of a 2–0 victory over Toronto FC.

On February 29, 2020, the opening day of the season, Buckmaster was waived by New York Red Bulls.

Buckmaster signed with USL Championship side Memphis 901 on July 13, 2020.

On January 6, 2021, Buckmaster moved to USL Championship club Indy Eleven. Following the 2021 season, it was announced that Buckmaster's contract option was declined by Indy Eleven.

Buckmaster returned to Memphis 901 on January 18, 2022. He left Memphis following the 2023 season.

Buckmaster joined Hartford Athletic on December 7, 2023. On July 15, 2024, Buckmaster made the mid-season move to San Antonio FC.
