= Tim Mulqueen =

American soccer player and coach

Personal information
- Full name: Timothy Mulqueen
- Date of birth: c. 1965 (age 60–61)
- Place of birth: Woodbridge Township, New Jersey
- Position: Goalkeeper

College career
Years	Team	Apps	(Gls)
1983–1988	Saint Joseph's Hawks		

Senior career*
Years	Team	Apps	(Gls)
1989	New Jersey Eagles		
1997	North Jersey Imperials		

Managerial career
- 1996–1999: MetroStars (assistant)
- 2000–2004: Kansas City Wizards (assistant)
- 1998–2009: United States (goalkeeping)
- 2017–2018: Orlando City (assistant)
- 2019–2020: Memphis 901
- 2024–: St. Joseph's Hawks
- * Club domestic league appearances and goals

Tim Mulqueen is an American soccer coach and former goalkeeper. He was most recently the head coach of Saint Joseph's Hawks men's soccer in the Atlantic 10 Conference.

Mulqueen grew up in the Fords section of Woodbridge Township, New Jersey and played soccer at St. Joseph High School.

He graduated from Saint Joseph's University in 1988. In 1989 Mulqueen played for the New Jersey Eagles in the ASL. In 1995-97 Mulqueen was listed as a player for the North Jersey Imperials in the USISL.

Mulqueen was an assistant coach at Rutgers University from 1988 to 1994. During that time Rutgers went to 3 Final Fours 1989, 1990 (National Finalist), and 1994.

He was goalkeeping coach for the MetroStars from 1996 to 1999 and the Kansas City Wizards from 2000 to 2004. Kansas City during that time won the 2000 MLS Supporters Shield, 2000 MLS Cup and the 2004 US Open Cup.

U.S. goalkeeper Tim Howard credits Mulqueen with helping to establish his own career. Mulqueen spent many nights training Howard, and waived fees so that Howard could get more experience from the age of 12.

Mulqueen was goalkeeper coach for the United States National Team at the 2004 Summer Olympics qualifying tournament, 2005 CONCACAF U17 Tournament, 2007 CONCACAF U17 Tournament, 2005/2007 FIFA U-17 World Cups, 2007 FIFA U-20 World Cup, 2008 Summer Olympics and the 2009 FIFA U-20 World Cup. Mulqueen also was an assistant coach of the 1995 Lafayette College Men's Soccer team, which made it to the NCAA Division I Tournament sweet 16.

Goalkeeper Tim Howard refers to Mulqueen as one of the first coaches he truly bonded with.

Mulqueen joined Orlando City in January 2017.

In August 2018, he was announced as the first head coach of Memphis 901 FC.

On December 9, 2024 he was announced as the next head coach of Saint Joseph's Hawks men's soccer. Only the 5th Head Coach in the school's history.

== Personal ==
Mulqueen is a member of St.Joseph’s Metuchen High School Athletic Hall of Fame, St. Joseph’s University Soccer Hall of Fame, and Rutgers University Athletic Hall of Fame.
