= Kyle Murphy (soccer) =

American soccer player (born 1992)

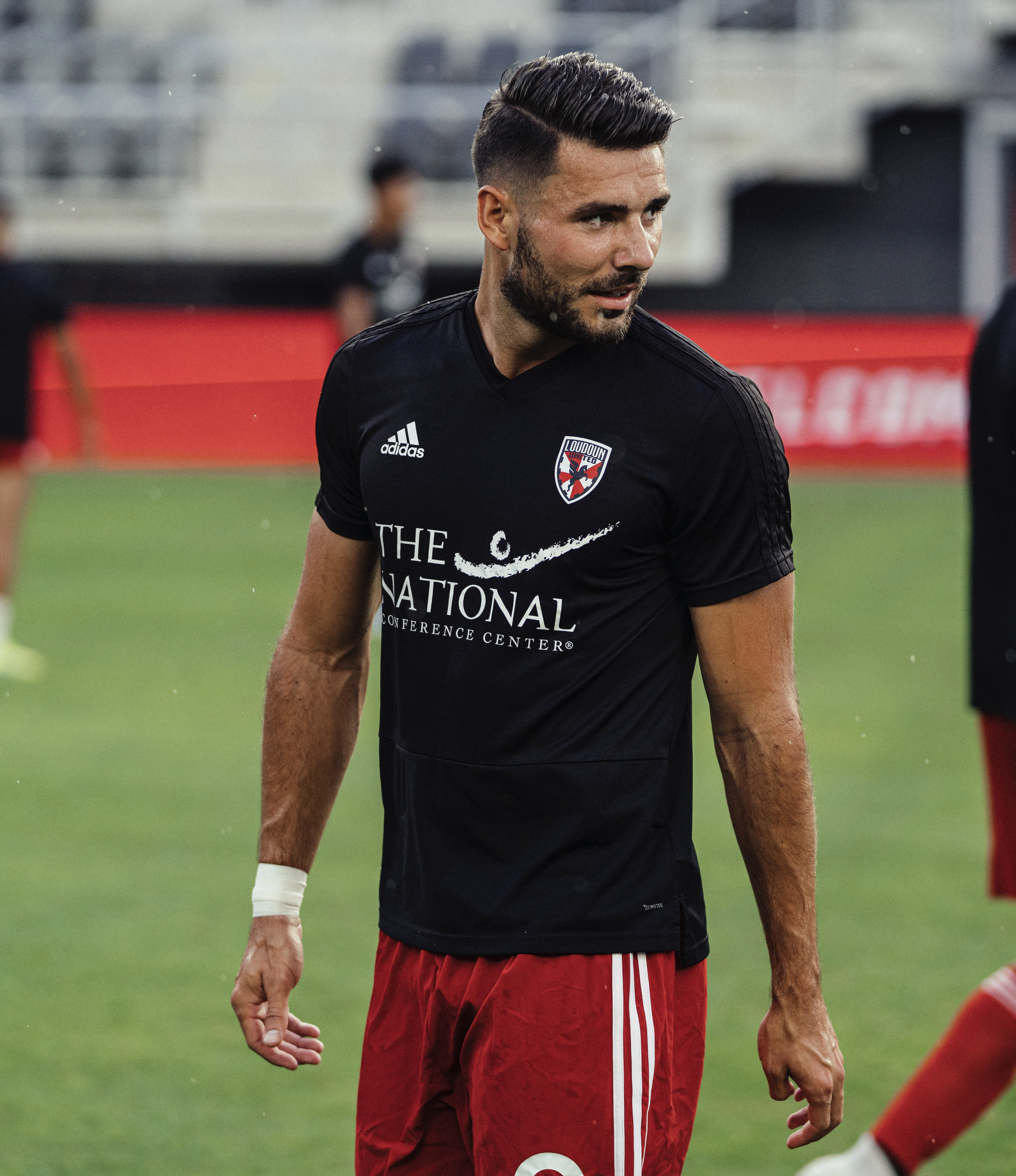
- Murphy with Loudoun in 2019

Personal information
- Date of birth: December 11, 1992 (age 33)
- Place of birth: Red Hook, New York, United States
- Height: 6 ft 0 in (1.83 m)
- Position: Forward

College career
Years	Team	Apps	(Gls)
2011–2015	Clemson Tigers	60	(11)

Senior career*
Years	Team	Apps	(Gls)
2016–2017	Rio Grande Valley FC	56	(11)
2018	San Antonio FC	16	(1)
2019	Loudoun United	29	(13)
2020	Tampa Bay Rowdies	15	(1)
2021	Memphis 901	31	(21)
2022–2023	Miami FC	66	(17)
2024	Memphis 901	0	(0)
- * Club domestic league appearances and goals as of January 25, 2024

Kyle Brandon Murphy (born December 11, 1992) is an American former professional soccer player who played as a forward.

== Career ==
=== Youth and college ===
Murphy played five years of college soccer at Clemson University between 2011 and 2015, including a red-shirted year in 2011.

Had eight goals and four assists in 2015, his final year, leading the Tigers to the 2015 National Championship game.

=== Professional ===
Murphy signed with United Soccer League side Rio Grande Valley FC Toros on March 26, 2016. He made his debut on the same day, coming on as a 74th-minute substitute in a 0–2 loss to Tulsa Roughnecks.

On June 14, 2017, Murphy signed contract with Houston Dynamo.

On May 10, 2018, San Antonio FC signed Murphy. He scored his debut goal for the team on July 25, 2018, in a 1–0 win against the Colorado Springs Switchbacks FC.

On February 21, 2019, Murphy signed for USL Championship expansion team Loudoun United FC. He scored his first goal for Loudoun against New York Red Bulls II on April 20, 2019.

Murphy would go on to log thirteen goals in the 2019 season while making 29 appearances. He served as the captain in all but two of his starts. Murphy was voted USL Championship Player of the Month for October 2019. He scored four goals and contributed an assist in four appearances, averaging a goal every 62.25 minutes.

Tampa Bay Rowdies signed Murphy on December 18, 2019, on a one-year contract with a 2021 option.

Murphy was signed by Memphis 901 on March 12, 2021. Murphy scored 21 goals in 31 appearances for Memphis, becoming the team's all-time leading scorer in just one season.

In December 2021, Murphy signed with Miami FC. He returned to Memphis 901 ahead of their 2024 season.

Murphy returned to Memphis 901 in November 2023, signing a multi-year contract. However, on January 25, 2024, Murphy announced his retirement.
