= Patrick Seagrist =

American soccer player (born 1998)

Personal information
- Date of birth: February 21, 1998 (age 28)
- Place of birth: Barrington, Illinois, United States
- Height: 6 ft 0 in (1.83 m)
- Position: Left-back

Team information
- Current team: Lexington SC

Youth career
- Chicago Sockers

College career
Years	Team	Apps	(Gls)
2016–2019	Marquette Golden Eagles	65	(6)

Senior career*
Years	Team	Apps	(Gls)
2019	Chicago FC United	7	(0)
2020	New York Red Bulls	3	(0)
2021	Inter Miami	0	(0)
2021	→ Indy Eleven (loan)	29	(0)
2022	Memphis 901	33	(1)
2023	Colorado Springs Switchbacks	21	(0)
2023–2025	FC Tulsa	53	(2)
2026	Greenville Triumph	14	(0)
2026–	Lexington SC	5	(1)
- * Club domestic league appearances and goals as of October 31, 2026

Patrick Seagrist (born February 21, 1998) is an American professional soccer player who plays as a defender for Lexington SC of the USL Championship.

== Early life and career ==
Seagrist attended Marquette University where he played for the soccer team for four years tallying 6 goals and 16 assists in 65 appearances.

In 2019, Seagrist made eight appearances for USL League Two club, Chicago FC United.

== Professional career ==
=== New York Red Bulls ===
Seagrist was select 10th overall in the 2020 MLS SuperDraft by the New York Red Bulls. On February 27, Seagrist signed his first professional contract with the first team.

Seagrist's option was declined by New York on November 30, 2020.

=== Inter Miami ===
On December 23, 2020, Seagrist joined Inter Miami ahead of their 2021 season. New York acquired a third-round 2021 MLS SuperDraft pick in exchange.

On April 15, 2021, it was announced that Seagrist would join USL Championship side Indy Eleven on a season-long loan.

Following the 2021 season, Seagrist's contract option was declined by Miami.

=== Memphis 901 FC ===
Seagrist signed with Memphis 901 in the USL Championship on January 20, 2022.

=== Colorado Springs Switchbacks ===
On November 21, 2022, it was announced that Seagrist would move to USL Championship side Colorado Springs Switchbacks at the beginning of the 2023 season.

=== FC Tulsa ===
On August 1, 2023, Seagrist was transferred to USL Championship side FC Tulsa for an undisclosed fee.

=== Greenville Triumph ===
In 2026, Seargrist signed for Greenville Triumph in USL League One.

=== Lexington SC ===
Seagrist moved back to the USL Championship on August 25, 2026, joining Lexington SC.

== Career statistics ==
As of August 30, 2020

Club	Season	League		League Cup		US Open Cup		CONCACAF		Total	
Club	Season	Apps	Goals	Apps	Goals	Apps	Goals	Apps	Goals	Apps	Goals
Chicago FC United	2019	7	0	1	0	0	0	0	0	8	0
New York Red Bulls	2020	3	0	0	0	0	0	0	0	3	0
Career total		10	0	1	0	0	0	0	0	11	0
