= Lucas Turci =

Brazilian footballer

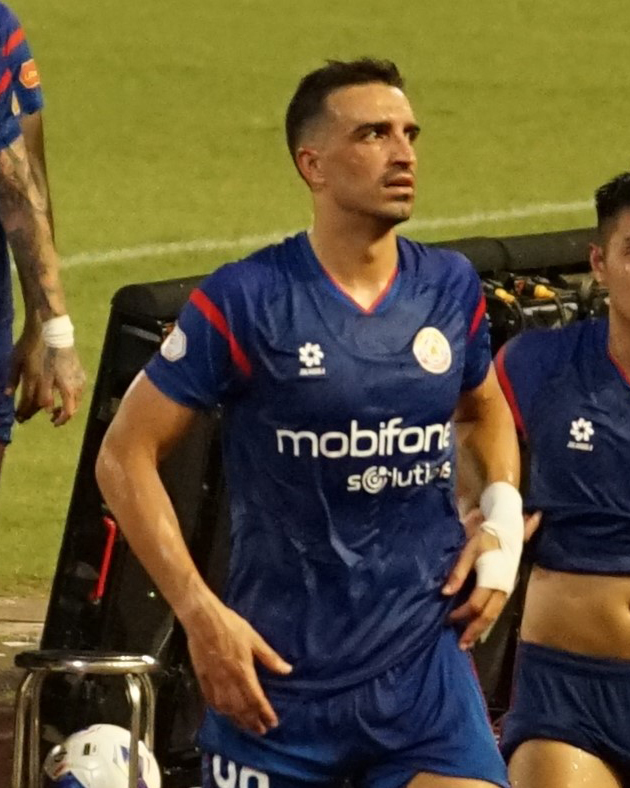
- Turci in 2026

Personal information
- Full name: Lucas Henrique Turci
- Date of birth: 23 August 1996 (age 30)
- Place of birth: Brazil
- Height: 1.92 m (6 ft 4 in)
- Position: Centre-back

Team information
- Current team: Ninh Binh
- Number: 96

Youth career
- São Paulo
- Corinthians
- Cruzeiro

Senior career*
Years	Team	Apps	(Gls)
2014–2016	São Caetano		
2016–2017	SV Schackendorf		
2018–2019	TSV Grunbach		
2019–2020	1. CfR Pforzheim	17	(0)
2020–2021	Union Fürstenwalde	11	(1)
2022–2024	Memphis 901	81	(6)
2025	Duhok	21	(2)
2025–2026	Al-Adalah	16	(0)
2026	PVF-CAND	13	(0)
2026–	Ninh Binh	1	(0)
- * Club domestic league appearances and goals as of 6 September 2026

Lucas Henrique Turci (born 23 August 1996) is a Brazilian professional footballer who plays as a centre-back in V.League 1 club Ninh Binh.

== Career ==
Turci played at youth level with various clubs in Brazil including São Paulo, Corinthians, and Cruzeiro. He then moved to Germany, playing at various lower levels, including spells with 1. CfR Pforzheim and Union Fürstenwalde.

On 11 March 2022, Turci signed for USL Championship club Memphis 901 ahead of their 2022 season.

On 10 September 2025, Turci joined Saudi FDL club Al-Adalah.

In July 2026, Turci moved to V.League 1 side Ninh Binh.

== Honours ==
Duhok

- Iraq FA Cup: 2024–25
- AGCFF Gulf Club Champions League: 2024–25
