= Dylan Borczak =

American soccer player (born 1999)

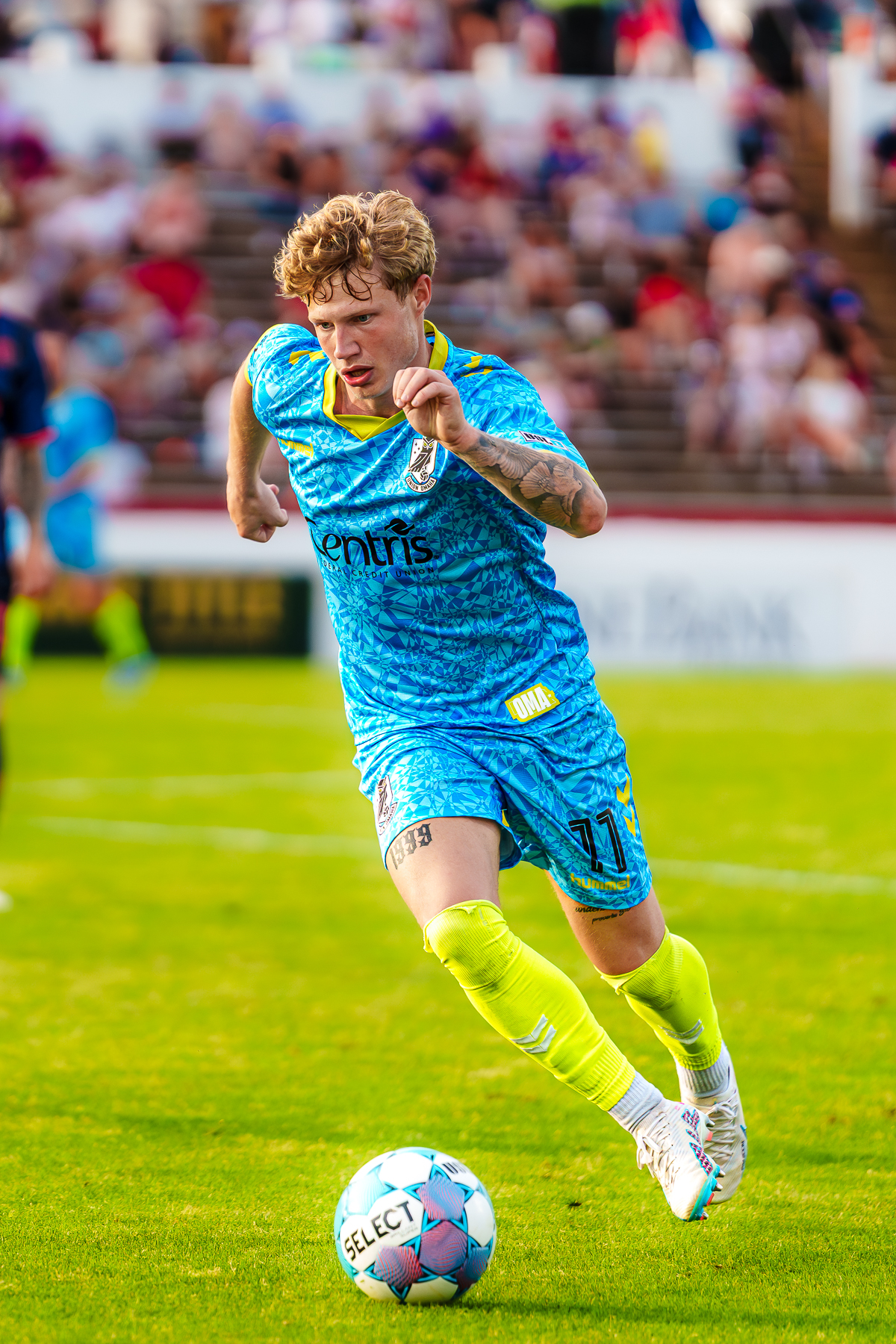
- Borczak with Union Omaha in 2026

Personal information
- Full name: Dylan Michael-Frank Borczak
- Date of birth: June 13, 1999 (age 27)
- Place of birth: Detroit, Michigan, United States
- Height: 1.77 m (5 ft 10 in)
- Position: Winger

Team information
- Current team: FC Tulsa on loan from Union Omaha
- Number: 11

Youth career
- Eastside FC

College career
Years	Team	Apps	(Gls)
2017	Schoolcraft Ocelots	19	(5)
2018–2021	Oakland Golden Grizzlies	56	(16)

Senior career*
Years	Team	Apps	(Gls)
2018	Oakland County FC		
2019	Carpathia FC		
2019–2021	Flint City Bucks	18	(0)
2022	Rio Grande Valley FC	21	(2)
2022–2024	Memphis 901	57	(5)
2025	Lexington SC	0	(0)
2026–	Union Omaha	11	(0)
2026–	→ FC Tulsa (loan)	2	(0)
- * Club domestic league appearances and goals as of November 10, 2026

Dylan Michael-Frank Borczak (born June 13, 1999) is an American professional soccer player for Union Omaha in the USL League One.

== Career ==
=== Youth ===
Borczak attended Western International High School in Detroit, Michigan, where he was a two-time team MVP as both a junior and senior. He also played club soccer for Eastside FC.

=== College and amateur ===
In 2017, Borczak attended Schoolcraft College to play college soccer in the NJCAA. In a single season with the Ocelots, Borczak made 19 appearances, scoring five goals and tallying 11 assists, helping the team all the way to the National Championship.

In 2018, Borczak transferred to NCAA Division I college Oakland University. He went on to make 56 appearances, scoring 16 goals and adding 15 assists to his name. Borczak was a two-time All-Horizon League First Team winner, Horizon League Offensive Player of the Year in the 2020–21 season, and All-Horizon League second team selection in his senior year.

Whilst at college, Borczak appeared for United Premier Soccer League sides Oakland County FC and Carpathia FC. Between 2019 and 2021, he played in the USL League Two side Flint City Bucks, helping them to become the 2019 USL League Two season champions. Prior to the 2021 season, Borczak was named to the MAC Hermann Trophy Watch List.

=== Professional ===
On March 2, 2022, Borczak signed his first professional contract with USL Championship side Rio Grande Valley FC. He made his debut on March 12, 2022, starting in 1–0 win over Oakland Roots.

On September 30, 2022, it was announced that Borczak had joined Memphis 901 on a multi-year deal for an undisclosed fee.

Following the 2024 season, Memphis suspended operations and Borczak subsequently joined Lexington SC on December 18, 2024.

In 2026, Borczak signed for Union Omaha in USL League One. In September 2026, FC Tulsa acquired Borczak on loan from Union Omaha for the remainder of the USL Championship season.

== Honors ==
=== Club ===
Flint City Bucks

- USL League Two: 2019
