= Graham Smith (soccer, born 1995) =

American soccer player (born 1995)

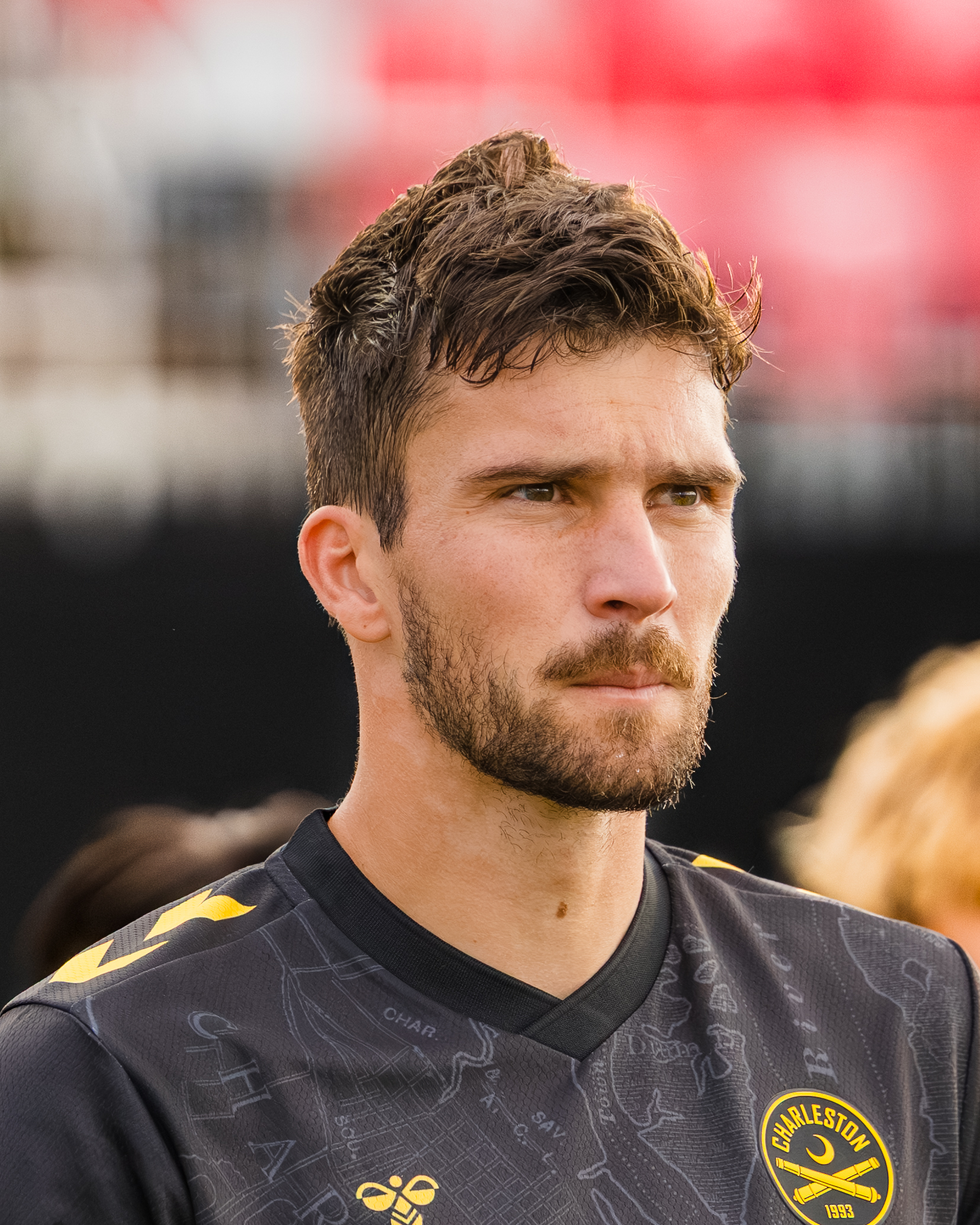
- Smith with the Charleston Battery in 2026

Personal information
- Full name: Graham Smith
- Date of birth: November 25, 1995 (age 30)
- Place of birth: Highlands Ranch, Colorado, United States
- Height: 1.90 m (6 ft 3 in)
- Positions: Defender; defensive midfielder

Team information
- Current team: Charleston Battery
- Number: 16

Youth career
- Real Colorado

College career
Years	Team	Apps	(Gls)
2014–2015	Oregon State Beavers	38	(0)
2016–2017	Denver Pioneers	42	(6)

Senior career*
Years	Team	Apps	(Gls)
2017	Colorado Rapids U-23	6	(2)
2018–2021	Sporting Kansas City	17	(1)
2018–2021	Sporting Kansas City II	64	(0)
2022–2023	Memphis 901	61	(5)
2024–	Charleston Battery	83	(3)
- * Club domestic league appearances and goals as of November 4, 2026

Graham Smith (born November 25, 1995) is an American professional soccer player who plays as a defender for Charleston Battery in the USL Championship.

== College and youth ==
Smith grew up in Colorado where he played soccer while attending Mountain Vista High School. He played two years of college soccer at Oregon State University between 2014 and 2015, before transferring to the University of Denver in 2016.

Smith appeared for Premier Development League side Colorado Rapids U-23 in 2017.

== Career ==
On January 19, 2018, Smith was drafted in the first-round (18th overall) during the 2018 MLS SuperDraft by Sporting Kansas City. Smith signed with Sporting KC on February 15, 2018.

Smith made his professional debut with Kansas City's United Soccer League affiliate Swope Park Rangers, on March 17, 2018, where Swope Park Rangers finished 4–3 winners against Reno 1868.

Smith made his Major League Soccer debut with Sporting Kansas City on June 23, 2018, where he started in a 3–2 victory over Houston Dynamo. Smith made two appearances in his first season with SKC, before seeing an expanded role in 2019. Smith logged his first MLS goal on August 17, 2019, in a 2–1 victory at home against San Jose Earthquakes. He would also log his first MLS assist on the lone goal in a 1–0 victory over Houston Dynamo on August 31, 2019. He finished the season with ten starts in eleven total appearances, including a pair of clean sheets.

Following the 2021 season, Smith's contract with Kansas City expired.

On February 18, 2022, Smith signed with USL Championship side Memphis 901 ahead of their upcoming 2022 season. He left Memphis following the 2023 season. He subsequently joined Charleston Battery ahead of their 2024 season on a multi-year deal.

== Honors ==
Individual

- USL Championship Defender of the Year: 2024
- USL Championship All-League First Team: 2024
- USL Championship All-League Second Team: 2022
