= Nighte Pickering =

American soccer player (born 2005)

Personal information
- Date of birth: January 26, 2005 (age 21)
- Place of birth: Birmingham, Alabama, United States
- Height: 1.83 m (6 ft 0 in)
- Position: Forward

Team information
- Current team: St. Louis City 2
- Number: 49

Youth career
- 2017–2022: FC Dallas

Senior career*
Years	Team	Apps	(Gls)
2022–2024	Memphis 901	64	(9)
2025–2026	Las Vegas Lights	32	(4)
2026–	St. Louis City 2	0	(0)

International career^{‡}
2022–	United States U19	2	(0)
- * Club domestic league appearances and goals as of July 17, 2026 ‡ National team caps and goals as of November 13, 2024

Nighte Pickering (born January 26, 2005) is an American soccer player who plays as a forward for St. Louis City 2 of MLS Next Pro.

== Career ==
=== Youth career ===
Pickering was born in Birmingham, Alabama, he joined the FC Dallas academy in 2017, where he stayed for five years. At Dallas, Pickering was a part of the under-15 team that won the 2019 FC Bayern adidas Campus Cup in Munich, Germany and won the Dallas Cup in 2017. he has 7 siblings, and was homeschooled.

=== Professional career ===
On August 4, 2022, Pickering signed his a professional multi-year contract with USL Championship side Memphis 901. He scored his first professional goal on his debut in a 3–1 win over Hartford Athletic on August 6, 2022.

Pickering signed with Las Vegas Lights FC on January 15, 2025. On July 17, 2026 Las Vegas announced the club had transferred Pickering to St. Louis City 2 while retaining a sell-on clause as part of the deal.
