= Phillip Goodrum =

American soccer player (born 1997)

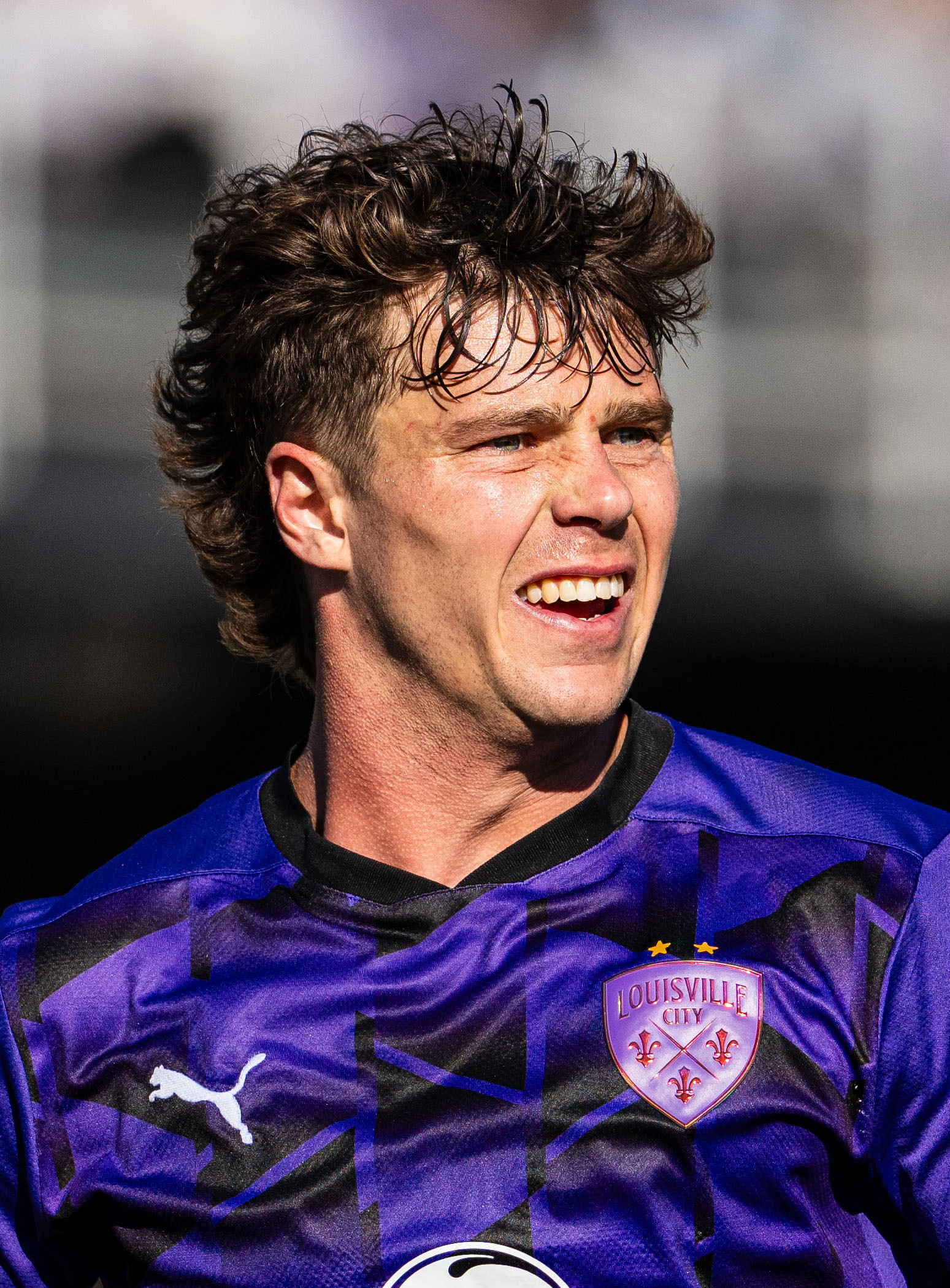
- Goodrum with Louisville City in 2025

Personal information
- Full name: Phillip Joseph Goodrum
- Date of birth: June 20, 1997 (age 29)
- Place of birth: Nashville, Tennessee, United States
- Height: 5 ft 11 in (1.80 m)
- Position: Forward

Team information
- Current team: Lexington SC
- Number: 9

Youth career
- 2014–2016: Carolina Rapids

College career
Years	Team	Apps	(Gls)
2016–2019	UNC Wilmington Seahawks	76	(32)

Senior career*
Years	Team	Apps	(Gls)
2016	North Carolina Fusion U23	12	(1)
2017	Wilmington Hammerheads	12	(0)
2018	North Carolina Fusion U23	4	(1)
2019	Brazos Valley Cavalry	2	(2)
2020–2021	Atlanta United 2	34	(6)
2022–2023	Memphis 901	47	(28)
2023–2024	FC Tulsa	38	(17)
2024–2025	Louisville City	38	(17)
2026–	Lexington SC	28	(13)
- * Club domestic league appearances and goals as of 11:25, 9 November 2026 (UTC)

Phillip Joseph Goodrum (born June 20, 1997) is an American soccer player who plays for Lexington SC in the USL Championship.

== Career ==
=== Youth and college ===
Goodrum played four years of college soccer at the University of North Carolina Wilmington between 2016 and 2019, where he made 76 appearances, scoring 32 goals and tallied 15 assists.

While at college, Goodrum appeared for USL PDL sides North Carolina Fusion U23, Wilmington Hammerheads and Brazos Valley Cavalry.

=== Professional ===
On January 13, 2020, Goodrum was selected 75th overall in the 2020 MLS SuperDraft by Atlanta United. After signing with the club's USL Championship side Atlanta United 2, he then signed a short-term deal with the first team ahead of their upcoming CONCACAF Champions League game.

On January 14, 2022, Goodrum returned to his home state of Tennessee, signing with Memphis 901. Goodrum set the Memphis franchise record for goals in a season in 2022 with 23. On May 22, 2023, Goodrum was traded to FC Tulsa in exchange for Rodrigo da Costa. Despite joining FC Tulsa after the 2023 season had already been underway, Goodrum also tied Tulsa's single-season goals record with 12. In January 2024, it was announced that Goodrum would be returning to Tulsa for the 2024 season. Goodrum was sold to Louisville City on August 14, 2024 for a league record transfer fee.

On December 29, 2025, it was announced that Goodrum had been transferred to USL Championship side Lexington SC for an undisclosed "six-figure" transfer fee.
