= Leston Paul =

Trinidadian professional footballer (born 1990)

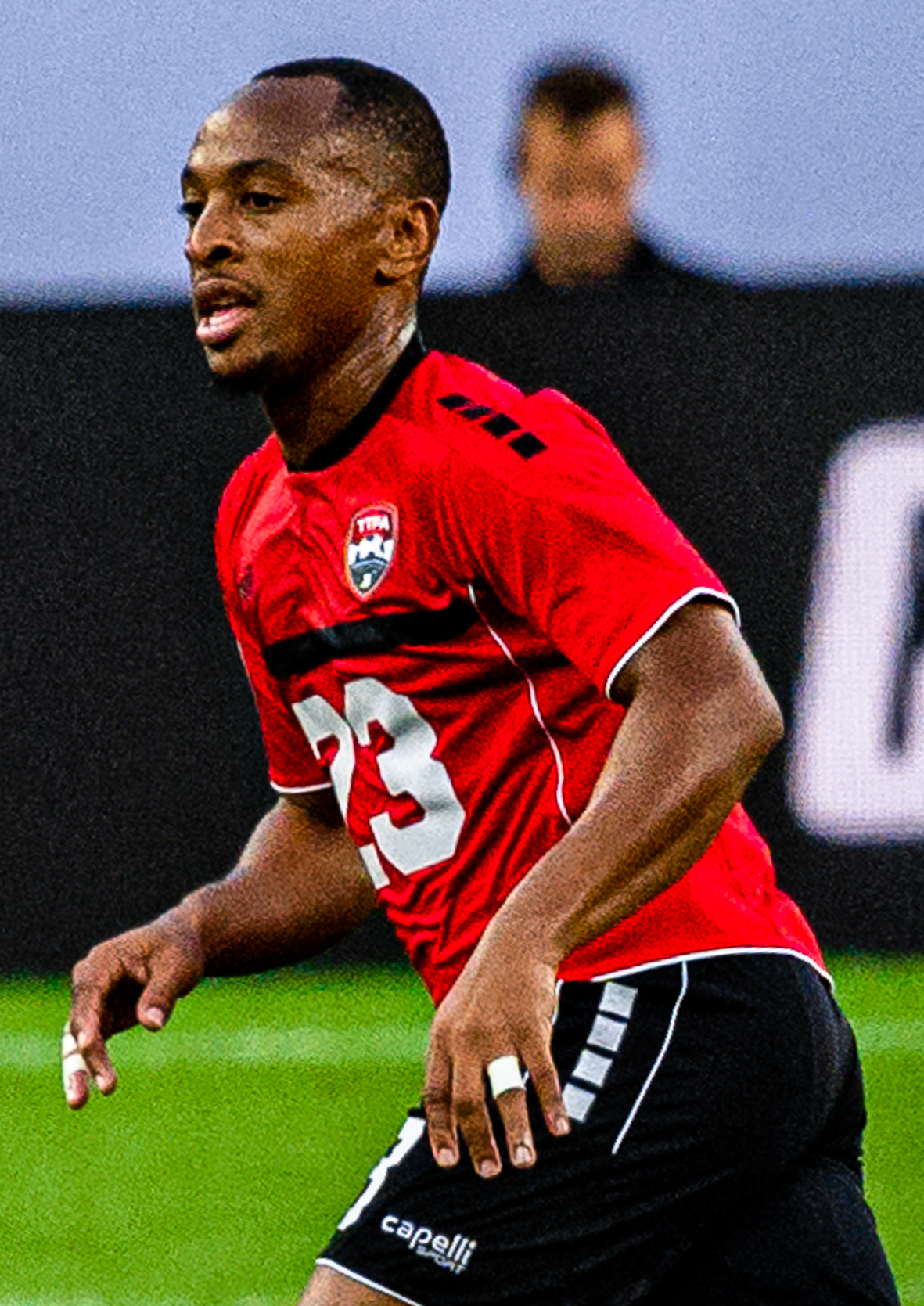
- Paul with Trinidad and Tobago at the 2019 CONCACAF Gold Cup

Personal information
- Date of birth: 11 March 1990 (age 36)
- Place of birth: Mayaro, Trinidad and Tobago
- Height: 1.75 m (5 ft 9 in)
- Position: Midfielder

College career
Years	Team	Apps	(Gls)
2010–2012	South Florida Bulls	58	(8)

Senior career*
Years	Team	Apps	(Gls)
2014–2017	Central		
2017–2018	Pasaquina	34	(2)
2018	Central		
2019–2024	Memphis 901	125	(0)

International career^{‡}
2007	Trinidad and Tobago U17		
2009	Trinidad and Tobago U20		
2014–	Trinidad and Tobago	30	(0)
- * Club domestic league appearances and goals as of 11 November 2023 ‡ National team caps and goals as of 15:15, 15 November 2018 (UTC)

Leston Peter Paul (born 11 March 1990) is a Trinidadian professional footballer who plays as a midfielder.

He previously played for Central F.C. in the Trinidad and Tobago (TT) Pro League, where he led the "Sharks" to a hat trick of TT Pro League titles (2014–15, 2015–16 and 2016–17) and back to back CFU Club Championship triumphs in the 2014–15 and 2015–16 seasons.

With 13 full international caps to his name, Paul has lined up for the Trinidad and Tobago national football team in the 2018 FIFA World Cup qualification in CONCACAF. He was also the captain of the Trinidad and Tobago National U-17 and U-20 teams that featured in the 2007 FIFA U-17 World Cup and 2009 FIFA U-20 World Cup.

== Career ==
Paul signed for Central F.C. in January 2014 amidst of flurry of other high profiled Trinidad and Tobago National team players such as Willis Plaza, Ataulla Guerra and Yohance Marshall. He quickly established himself as an integral cog in Central's midfield alongside veteran and TT Pro League legend Marvin Oliver. In his first full season with the "Sharks" he helped the team secure an unprecedented 9 trophies (5 major trophies and 4 minor trophies) including the club's first TT Pro League and CFU Club Championship titles. Paul also scored the solitary goal in the 2014 First Citizens Cup Final versus North East Stars F.C. The club lifted the CFU Club Championship title on home soil by defeating arch rival W Connection F.C. 2–1 at the Ato Boldon Stadium. Paul's excellent performances and natural leadership qualities shone through during the season and he was eventually named club captain towards the end of the 2014–15 season.

In the following season, Paul once again led the club in retaining the two most prestigious titles: TT Pro League and CFU Club Championship. This proved especially difficult as Paul and his teammates faced off against a hostile Don Bosco of Haiti which was playing at home in the CFU Club Championship semi-final. The score was locked at 1–1 at the end of added extra time in heavy rain but Central F.C. pulled off a 2-4 penalty shootout victory with Paul scoring the winning penalty. This win secured a repeat of the 2015 final versus W Connection which the "Sharks" ran out comfortable 3–0 winners. Paul was also named the 2016 CFU Club Championship MVP.

In a tumultuous 2016–17, Paul was yet again a mainstay at the heart of the "Sharks" midfield as they made history but claiming a hat trick of TT Pro League titles.

He then decided to seek a new challenge at North East Stars F.C. for a brief spell before signing for Pasaquina.

== International career ==
Leston Paul was born and grew up in Mayaro, Trinidad but attended and represented St. Mary's College (Port of Spain) with distinction. He captained St. Mary's College to the North Zone Intercol title in 2007. In that same year, he led the Trinidad and Tobago National U17 team to the 2007 FIFA U17 World Cup in Korea and played in all 3 matches in a group featuring Germany, Ghana and Colombia. In 2008, he was selected by none other than John Barnes as one of eight Caribbean players to earn a 1-week training stint at Sunderland's Stadium of Light as part of Digicel's Kick Start Clinic. In 2009, the combative midfielder led the Trinidad and Tobago U20 team to the 2009 FIFA U20 World Cup in Egypt where the team was eventually eliminated from Group A featuring the likes of Paraguay, Italy and hosts Egypt.

Paul's performances earned him a 4-year scholarship at the University of South Florida (USF) where he excelled and was selected on the Rookie Team of the Year in 2010 and the Big East Third Teams of the Year from 2010 to 2012. Upon graduating from USF in 2012, he returned home to Trinidad and represented hometown club Guaya United F.C. (National Super League) briefly before permanently moving to Central F.C. Paul was awarded his first Trinidad and Tobago Senior International cap by then head coach Stephen Hart in the 2014 Caribbean Cup qualification stage against the Dominican Republic in October 2014. He helped the team to a commanding 6–1 victory and then made appearances throughout the qualification stage. With Paul at the heart of the midfield, T&T overcame Curaçao and Cuba before being runners-up to Jamaica in the final. He then went on to make further appearances under coach Hart in friendly internationals against Jordan, Peru and Uruguay. He performed well in the contest against Uruguay in May 2016 where the South American giants won 3–1 with Edinson Cavani scoring a brace. His last Senior International Cap came in a 2–0 loss to USA on 8 June 2017 in CONCACAF fifth round (also known as the Hex) in 2018 FIFA World Cup qualifying.
