= Ben Pirmann =

American soccer coach (born 1985)

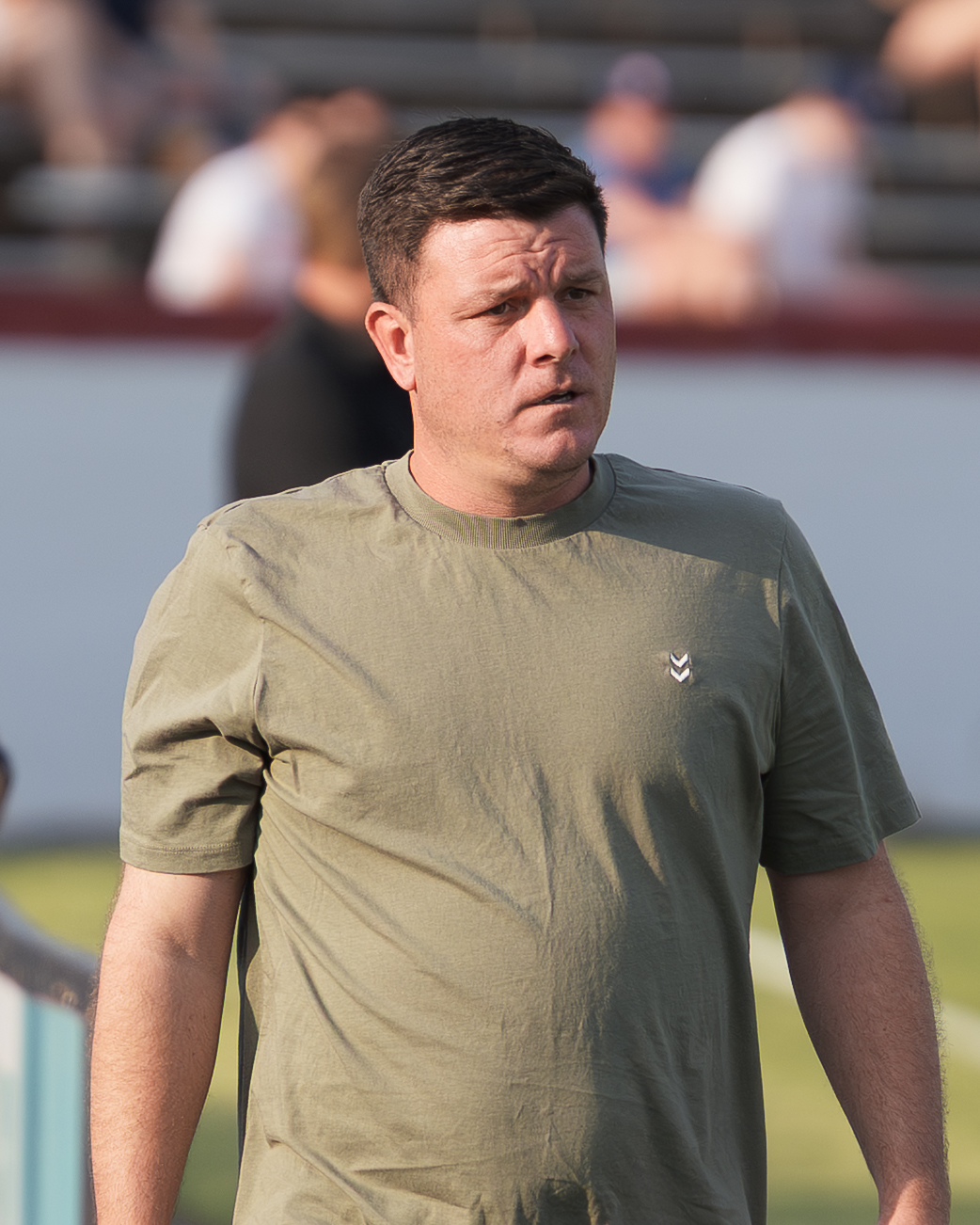
- Pirmann coaching the Charleston Battery in 2026

Personal information
- Full name: Benjamin Pirmann
- Date of birth: September 19, 1985 (age 41)
- Place of birth: Detroit, Michigan, United States
- Position: Midfielder

Team information
- Current team: Charleston Battery (head coach)

College career
Years	Team	Apps	(Gls)
2004–2008	Michigan State Spartans		

Senior career*
Years	Team	Apps	(Gls)
2005–2006	Indiana Invaders	19	(2)
2007–2008	West Michigan Edge	14	(1)

Managerial career
- 2009–2010: Western Michigan Broncos (assistant)
- 2011–2018: Michigan State Spartans (assistant)
- 2013–2018: Detroit City
- 2018–2020: Memphis 901 (assistant)
- 2020: Memphis 901 (interim)
- 2021–2022: Memphis 901
- 2023–: Charleston Battery
- * Club domestic league appearances and goals

Ben Pirmann (born September 19, 1985) is an American soccer coach who is the head coach of USL Championship club Charleston Battery.

== Playing career ==
Pirmann played four years of college soccer at Michigan State University between 2004 and 2008, including a redshirted year in 2007. Pirmann tallied 13 assists and scored one goal during his career, leading MSU in assists in 2006. He was a three-time Academic All-Big Ten selection and was the Spartans' recipient of the Big Ten Sportsmanship award in 2008.

Pirmann also played in the USL PDL with both West Michigan Edge and Indiana Invaders.

== Management career ==
Pirmann began coaching as an assistant at Western Michigan University in 2009. After three seasons, he moved to the same role with his alma mater Michigan State University.

In addition to his role at MSU, Pirmann also served as head coach of NPSL side Detroit City FC between 2013 and 2018. He amassed a 49-17-17 regular-season record over the six seasons he was in charge, with the team's best finish being a 2017 run to the NPSL national semifinals.

On December 13, 2018, Pirmann joined USL Championship side Memphis 901 as their assistant coach. On September 15, 2020, following the dismissal of head coach Tim Mulqueen, Pirmann was named interim head coach for the remainder of the season. On April 8, 2021, he was named head coach on a permanent basis. On November 9, 2022, Pirmann was named 2022 USL Championship Coach of the Year.

On November 17, 2022, it was announced that Pirmann had left his head coaching position at Memphis 901 for the same role with the Charleston Battery.

Pirmann's first season with the Battery was marked with success and he was named a finalist for the Championship Coach of the Year for a second straight year. The Battery set a league record for the greatest turnaround season in USL Championship history with a season-to-season gain of +34 points (25 in 2022 to 59 in 2023). Charleston also set a new club record for most wins in a USL Championship regular season (17). Charleston additionally had a league-best 29 points away from home and tied for the most road wins (eight). The Battery won the Eastern Conference Final and reached the 2023 USL Championship Final, falling in the penalty shootout.

== Honors ==
Charleston Battery

- Eastern Conference Champions (Playoffs): 2023

=== Individual ===
- USL Championship Coach of the Year: 2022
