= Memphis 901 FC =

American professional soccer team

- Full name: Memphis 901 FC
- Founded: January 8, 2018; 8 years ago
- Dissolved: November 13, 2024; 14 months ago
- Stadium: AutoZone Park; Memphis, Tennessee
- Capacity: 10,000
- Owner(s): Peter B. Freund; Craig Unger; Tim Howard
- Sporting director: Caleb Patterson-Sewell
- Coach: Stephen Glass
- League: USL Championship
- 2024: 3rd, Western Conference; Playoffs: Conference Quarterfinals
- Website: memphis901fc.com
Home colors	Away colors

Memphis 901 FC was an American professional soccer team based in Memphis, Tennessee. Founded in 2018, the team made its debut in the USL Championship in 2019.

On November 13, 2024, it was announced that the team would be folding after they were unable to secure funding for a new soccer-specific stadium at the fairgrounds site. The USL Championship franchise rights were transferred to Santa Barbara Sky FC, based in Santa Barbara, California.

== Colors and badge ==
The club's name referred to the local area code for the Memphis area. On September 1, 2018, Memphis 901 FC unveiled their logo, which uses concentric lines styled like neon signs to form a LP record; the lines are a reference to Beale Street, which has several buildings that use neon signage.

=== Sponsorship ===
Season	Kit manufacturer	Shirt sponsor
2019–2021	Nike	Terminix
2022–2023	Puma	Terminix
2024	Charly	Cancer Kickers

== Stadium ==
The club played at AutoZone Park, a baseball stadium that is also home to the minor league Memphis Redbirds. For its matches, the stadium's dirt infield was replaced with sod, and a pitch was laid along the first baseline. The club also played at Mike Rose Soccer Complex for a U.S. Open Cup game against Hartford Athletic on May 29, 2019, and for a U.S. Open Cup game against Orlando City SC on June 12, 2019.

On October 18, 2022, the club announced plans for a new soccer-specific stadium with a capacity of 10,000. The stadium was planned to open in time for the 2025 USL Championship season and would have been constructed at the current site of the Mid-South Coliseum, which closed in 2006.

== Ownership ==
The club was owned by Peter B. Freund, principal owner of Trinity Sports Holdings, Craig Unger, and former United States men's national soccer team goalkeeper Tim Howard. Trinity Sports Holdings' portfolio includes minor league baseball clubs Memphis Redbirds, the Charleston RiverDogs and the Williamsport Crosscutters. Unger also served as president, general manager, and part owner of the Redbirds. The consortium also purchased a majority holding in English fifth-tier club, Dagenham & Redbridge F.C.

== Club culture ==
=== Rivalries ===
Memphis competed in the Southern Harm derby against rivals Birmingham Legion.

=== Supporters ===
The Bluff City Mafia supported Memphis 901. Founded in August 2018, before Memphis' inaugural season, they were known for their march from a local Irish pub to AutoZone Park before every home game.

Before every home game, the Bluff City Mafia invited local celebrities and officials to take part in what had become known as the Guitar Smash, an homage to Memphis' musical roots.

== Players and staff ==
=== Final roster ===
As of August 1, 2024

Note: Flags indicate national team as defined under FIFA eligibility rules; some limited exceptions apply. Players may hold more than one non-FIFA nationality.

No.	Pos.	Nation	Player
1	GK	USA	Tyler Deric
2	DF	TOG	Tulu
3	DF	USA	Carson Vom Steeg
4	MF	USA	Emerson Hyndman
5	MF	ARG	Samuel Careaga (on loan from Lanús)
6	MF	AUS	Zach Duncan
7	FW	USA	Noe Meza
8	DF	BRA	Lucas Turci
9	MF	BRA	Luiz Fernando
10	MF	BRA	Bruno Lapa
11	FW	BRA	Marlon Santos
14	DF	USA	Akeem Ward
15	FW	JAM	Neco Brett

No.	Pos.	Nation	Player
18	MF	USA	Alvaro Quezada
19	DF	USA	Oscar Jimenez
20	FW	USA	Nighte Pickering
21	MF	AUS	Panos Armenakas
22	GK	CAN	Triston Henry
23	MF	TRI	Leston Paul
26	GK	USA	Aren Seeger
44	DF	USA	Nick DePuy (on loan from Huntsville City)
47	GK	USA	Taylor Bailey
77	FW	USA	Dylan Borczak
91	DF	FRA	AB Cissoko
99	MF	ESP	Jon Bakero

USL Academy Contract

=== Staff ===
As of February 27, 2022

Technical staff
Sporting director	Caleb Patterson-Sewell
Manager	Stephen Glass
Assistant manager	Caleb Patterson-Sewell
Director of Sports Science	Leandro Spinola
Athletic trainer	Langston Smith

== Team records ==
=== Year-by-year ===
As of November 13, 2024

Season	USL Championship								Play-offs	U.S. Open Cup	Top scorer ^{1}		Head coach
Season	P	W	L	D	GF	GA	Pts	Pos	Play-offs	U.S. Open Cup	Player	Goals	Head coach
2019	34	9	18	7	37	52	34	15th, Eastern; 30th, Overall	Did not qualify	4th Round	(United States) Brandon Allen	10	(United States) Tim Mulqueen
2020	15	4	7	4	24	31	16	11th, Eastern; 4th, Group G	Did not qualify	Cancelled	(United States) Cal Jennings	9	(United States) Tim Mulqueen (2–6–4) (United States) Ben Pirmann (2–1–0)
2021	32	14	10	8	47	42	50	7th, Eastern; 4th, Central	Conference Quarterfinals	Cancelled	(United States) Kyle Murphy	20	(United States) Ben Pirmann
2022	34	21	8	5	67	33	68	2nd, Eastern; 3rd, Overall	Conference Semifinals	2nd Round	(United States) Phillip Goodrum	21	(United States) Ben Pirmann
2023	34	14	10	10	59	53	52	4th, Eastern; 5th, Overall	Conference Quarterfinals	Round of 32	(Brazil) Rodrigo da Costa	15	(Scotland) Stephen Glass
2024	34	14	9	11	52	41	51	3rd, Western; 8th, Overall	Conference Quarterfinals	Round of 32	(Brazil) Bruno Lapa	11	(Scotland) Stephen Glass

1. Top scorer includes statistics from league matches only.

=== Head coaches ===
- Includes USLC regular season, USLC playoffs, U.S. Open Cup. Excludes friendlies.

Coach	Nationality	Start	End	Games	Win	Loss	Draw	Win %
Tim Mulqueen	United States	August 15, 2018	September 15, 2020	49	13	25	11	26.53
Ben Pirmann (Interim)	United States	September 15, 2020	April 8, 2021	3	2	1	0	66.67
Ben Pirmann	United States	April 8, 2021	November 17, 2022	70	36	21	13	51.43
Stephen Glass	Scotland	November 22, 2022	November 13, 2024	75	31	19	25	41.33

=== Average attendance ===
Year	Reg. season	Playoffs
2019	6,623	—
2020	N/A	—
2021	4,075	—
2022	3,634	6,037
2023	3,344	3,587
2024	2,951	—

Attendance records taken from USL Championship match reports and collated by Soccer Stadium Digest, 2022.
