= 2024 Sacramento Republic FC season =

Sacramento Republic FC
2024 season
- Owner: Kevin M. Nagle
- Head coach: Mark Briggs
- Stadium: Heart Health Park
- USL Championship: Conference: 3rd Overall: 7th
- USL Playoffs: Conference Quarterfinals
- U.S. Open Cup: Quarterfinals
- Top goalscorer: League: Kieran Phillips (12 goals); All: Kieran Phillips (15 goals)
- Highest home attendance: 11,569 (4 times)
- Lowest home attendance: 8,688 (August 14, against El Paso Locomotive FC)
- Average home league attendance: 10,101
- Biggest win: 4-0 (September 29, against New Mexico United)
Home colors	Away colors	Third colors

The 2024 Sacramento Republic FC season was the club's eleventh season in existence. The club played in the USL Championship, the second tier of the American soccer pyramid. Sacramento Republic FC competes in the Western Conference of the USL Championship.

== Roster ==
As of July 9, 2024

Note: Flags indicate national team as defined under FIFA eligibility rules; some limited exceptions apply. Players may hold more than one non-FIFA nationality.

No.	Pos.	Nation	Player
1	GK	USA	Danny Vitiello
2	DF	ENG	Jack Gurr
3	DF	ESP	Damià Viader
4	DF	IRL	Lee Desmond
5	DF	USA	Jared Timmer
6	DF	USA	Shane Wiedt
7	FW	USA	Trevor Amann
8	MF	MEX	Rodrigo López
9	FW	COL	Juan Herrera
10	MF	ARG	Cristian Parano
11	FW	USA	Russell Cicerone
14	FW	MEX	Da'vian Kimbrough

No.	Pos.	Nation	Player
15	MF	USA	Rafael Jauregui
17	DF	USA	Jonathan Ricketts
19	MF	SCO	Nick Ross
20	MF	USA	Blake Willey
23	FW	ENG	Kieran Phillips
24	DF	USA	Conor Donovan
40	DF	USA	Adair Sanchez
41	DF	USA	Luis Garcia
42	FW	USA	Felix Contreras
43	MF	USA	Justin Portillo
55	DF	USA	Chibuike Ukaegbu
96	MF	USA	Luis Fernandes
99	GK	USA	Jared Mazzola

=== Technical staff ===
Position	Name
General manager	(United States) Todd Dunivant
Head coach	(England) Mark Briggs
Assistant coach	(England) Danny Dichio
Goalkeeping coach	(United States) Ross Cain
Strength and conditioning coach	(United States) Luke Rayfield
Head athletic trainer	(United States) Betty Olmeda

== Competitions ==
=== USL Championship ===
==== Table ====
Pos	Team	Pld	W	L	T	GF	GA	GD	Pts	Qualification
3	Memphis 901 FC	34	14	11	9	52	41	+11	51	Playoffs
4	Las Vegas Lights FC	34	13	10	11	49	46	+3	50	Playoffs
5	Sacramento Republic FC	34	13	11	10	46	34	+12	49	Playoffs
6	Orange County SC	34	13	14	7	38	45	−7	46	Playoffs
7	Oakland Roots SC	34	13	16	5	37	57	−20	44	Playoffs

Source: USL Championship Standings
Rules for classification: 1) head-to-head points; 2) head-to-head goal differential; 3) points-per game within conference; 4) total wins; 5) total goal differential; 6) total goals scored; 7) points earned against top four Conference finishers; 8) disciplinary points; 9) coin toss or drawing of lots

==== Match results ====
On December 18, 2023, the USL Championship released the regular season schedule for all 24 teams.

All times are in Pacific Standard Time.

===== March =====
March 9 1	Sacramento Republic FC	2–2	Orange County SC	Sacramento, California
7:00 PM	Amann 28', 77', (yellow card) 79'; Jauregui (yellow card) 40'; Mazzola (yellow card) 51'; Ricketts (yellow card) 90+3'	Report	Partida (yellow card) 35'; Casiple 42'; Djeffal (yellow card) 45+2'; Shutler (yellow card) 90+3', (goal) 90+6'	Stadium: Heart Health Park; Attendance: 11,569; Referee: Alexis Da Silva
Note: Colin Shutler's header was the first goal by a goalkeeper in Orange County SC's history.

March 16 2	Miami FC	0–1	Sacramento Republic FC	Miami, Florida
4:00 PM	Biek (yellow card) 71'; Mines (yellow card) 82'; Booth (yellow card) 88'	Report	Desmond (yellow card) 44'; Gurr (yellow card) 53'; Amann 59'; Parano (yellow card) 66'	Stadium: FIU Stadium; Attendance: 1,044; Referee: Elton García

March 23 3	Indy Eleven	1–1	Sacramento Republic FC	Indianapolis, Indiana
4:00 PM	Williams 34'; Diz (yellow card) 71'; Schneider (yellow card) 79'	Report	Chapman-Page 31' (o.g.); Timmer (yellow card) 83'	Stadium: Michael A. Carroll Stadium; Attendance: 8,451; Referee: Joshua Encarnación

March 30 4	Sacramento Republic FC	1–0	Memphis 901 FC	Sacramento, California
7:00 PM	Fernandes (yellow card) 45+2'; López (yellow card) 52'; Donovan (yellow card) 64'; Ricketts 87'	Report	Duncan (yellow card) 13'; Turci (yellow card) 16'; Pickering (yellow card) 54'; Vom Steeg (yellow card) 65'; Yellow (yellow card) 72'; Careaga (yellow card) 73'; Meza (yellow card) 90'	Stadium: Heart Health Park; Attendance: 9,488; Referee: Elijio Arreguin

===== April =====
April 6 5	Colorado Springs Switchbacks FC	0–2	Sacramento Republic FC	Colorado Springs, Colorado
5:00 PM	Tejada (yellow card) 43'; Herrera (yellow card) 43'; Ackwei (yellow card) 63'	Report	Amann 5'; Cicerone 26' (yellow card) 43'; Ross (yellow card) 54'	Stadium: Weidner Field; Attendance: 6,965; Referee: Brad Jensen

April 13 6	Sacramento Republic FC	1–1	FC Tulsa	Sacramento, California
7:00 PM	Amann (yellow card) 3'; Fernandes (yellow card) 5'; López 33'	Report	Diallo (yellow card) 15'; Laszo (yellow card) 16' (yellow-red card) 16'; Ferri (yellow card) 45+1'; St Clair (yellow card) 56'; Seagrist 64'; Roggeveen (yellow card) 90+4'	Stadium: Heart Health Park; Attendance: 8,891; Referee: Ricardo Fierro

April 20 7	Orange County SC	0–2	Sacramento Republic FC	Irvine, California
7:00 PM	Dunbar (yellow card) 29'; Amang (yellow card) 34'; Scott (yellow card) 70'	Report	Amann 1'; Fernandes (yellow card) 22'; Sanchez 25'; Desmond (yellow card) 30'; Cicerone (yellow card) 52'; Timmer (yellow card) 58'; Ross (yellow card) 90+4'	Stadium: Championship Soccer Stadium; Attendance: 4,200; Referee: Abdou Ndiaye

April 27 8	Sacramento Republic FC	3–1	Loudoun United FC	Sacramento, California
7:00 PM	López (yellow card) 5'; Cicerone 10'; Donovan (yellow card) 21'; Amann (yellow card) 49'; Sanchez (yellow card) 69'; Gurr (yellow card) 77'; Timmer (yellow card) 78'; Phillips 86' 90+2'	Report	Leggett 28'; Awuah (yellow card) 45+4'; McCabe (yellow card) 60'; Skundrich (yellow card) 75'	Stadium: Heart Health Park; Attendance: 10,246; Referee: Trevor Wiseman

===== May =====
May 4 9	Phoenix Rising FC	1–1	Sacramento Republic FC	Phoenix, Arizona
7:30 PM	Cabral (yellow card) 29' (goal) 66'; Formella (yellow card) 51'; Cuello (yellow card) 53'; Stenberg (yellow card) 62'	Report	López 33'; Fernandes (yellow card) 62'	Stadium: Phoenix Rising Soccer Stadium; Attendance: 5,596; Referee: Adam Kilpatrick

May 11 10	Rhode Island FC	2–2	Sacramento Republic FC	Smithfield, Rhode Island
4:30 PM	Turnbull 31'; Yao 42' (yellow card) 76'; Alves (yellow card) 61'; Turnbull (yellow card) 67'	Report	Amann 38'; Ricketts 90+3'; Herrera (yellow card) 90+5'	Stadium: Beirne Stadium; Attendance: 3,974; Referee: Alejo Calume

May 25 11	Sacramento Republic FC	0–0	Birmingham Legion FC	Sacramento, California
7:00 PM	Timmer (yellow card) 13'; Nick Ross (yellow card) 22'; Gurr (yellow card) 89'; Herrera (red card) 89'	Report	Rufe (yellow card) 88'; Kavita (yellow card) 90'	Stadium: Heart Health Park; Attendance: 10,188; Referee: Brandon Stevis

===== June =====
June 1 12	Sacramento Republic FC	0–1	Tampa Bay Rowdies	Sacramento, California
7:00 PM	Sanchez (yellow card) 86'	Report	Dennis 53'; Guillen (yellow card) 90+7'	Stadium: Heart Health Park; Attendance: 9,547; Referee: Gerald Flores

June 8 13	Monterey Bay FC	0–2	Sacramento Republic FC	Seaside, California
7:00 PM	Martínez (yellow card) 82'	Report	Herrera (yellow card) 45+1'; Phillips 54'; Parano 62'; Gurr (red card) 90+2'	Stadium: Cardinale Stadium; Attendance: 3,309; Referee: Matthew Thompson

June 15 14	Sacramento Republic FC	2–3	Oakland Roots SC	Sacramento, California
8:00 PM	Mazzola (yellow card) 75'; Portillo (yellow card) 75'; Amann 79' 90+2'; Donovan (yellow card) 90+5'	Report	Mfeka 19' 48'; Margvelashvili (yellow card) 31'; Syrel (yellow card) 33'; Diaz (yellow card) 36'; Reid (yellow card) 62'; Cedeno 65'; Rasmussen (yellow card) 70'; Dwyer (yellow card) 90+8'	Stadium: Heart Health Park; Attendance: 10,843; Referee: Sergii Demianchuk

June 22 15	FC Tulsa	0–0	Sacramento Republic FC	Tulsa, Oklahoma
5:30 PM	St Clair (yellow card) 40'; Bourgeois (yellow card) 45+6'; Goodrum (yellow card) 49'; Ferri (yellow card) 62'; Kacinari (yellow card) 90+10'	Report	Herrera (yellow card) 75'	Stadium: ONEOK Field; Attendance: 3,433; Referee: John Matto

June 29 16	Sacramento Republic FC	1–0	Hartford Athletic	Sacramento, California
8:00 PM	Portillo (yellow card) 22'; Amann (yellow card) 70'; Herrera 87'	Report	Barrera (yellow card) 36'; Asiedu (yellow card) 65'; Ribeiro (yellow card) 79'	Stadium: Heart Health Park; Attendance: 9,249; Referee: Muhammad Hassan

===== July =====
July 3 17	Sacramento Republic FC	0–1	Las Vegas Lights FC	Sacramento, California
7:30 PM	Phillips (yellow card) 80'; Portillo (yellow card) 90+4'	Report	Pinzon 10'; Ngando (yellow card) 70'; Arozarena (yellow card) 71'; Nigro (yellow card) 75'	Stadium: Heart Health Park; Attendance: 8,988; Referee: Jeremy Scheer

July 13 18	Sacramento Republic FC	0–0	North Carolina FC	Sacramento, California
8:00 PM	Portillo (yellow card) 62'; Fernandes (yellow card) 90+1'	Report	Mentzingen (yellow card) 66'; Maldonado (yellow card) 74'; Craig (yellow card) 87'	Stadium: Heart Health Park; Attendance: 9,388; Referee: Corbyn May

July 21 19	Oakland Roots SC	2–5	Sacramento Republic FC	Hayward, California
1:00 PM	Rodriguez (yellow card) 31' (goal) 55', 71'; Riley (yellow card) 53'; Gomez (yellow card) 73'	Report	Phillips 5', 46'; Wiedt 27' (yellow card) 32'; Fernandes (yellow card) 39'; Ross 45'; Sanchez (yellow card) 73'; Amann 85'; Ricketts (yellow card) 90+1'	Stadium: Pioneer Stadium; Attendance: 5,446; Referee: Abdou Ndiaye

July 27 20	Detroit City FC	0–1	Sacramento Republic FC	Hamtramck, Michigan
	Sheldon (yellow card) 26'	Report	Cicerone 84'	Stadium: Keyworth Stadium; Attendance: 6,039; Referee: Joshua Encarnación

===== August =====
August 3 21	Sacramento Republic FC	0–1	Pittsburgh Riverhounds SC	Sacramento, California
7:00 PM	Timmer (yellow card) 68'	Report	Kizza 43'; Biasi (yellow card) 79'	Stadium: Heart Health Park; Attendance: 9,459; Referee: Elton García

August 10 22	Louisville City FC	4–3	Sacramento Republic FC	Louisville, Kentucky
6:00 PM	Harros 8', 90+4'; Serrano (yellow card) 39'; Davila 46'; Wilson 66'; Dia (yellow card) 69'; Mcfadden (yellow card) 88'; Adams (yellow card) 90+2'	Report	Fernandes (yellow card) 19'; Portillo (yellow card) 45+2'; Ross 52', 59'; Phillips 55' (yellow card) 67'; Ukaegbu (yellow card) 80'	Stadium: Lynn Family Stadium; Attendance: 8,768; Referee: Sergii Demianchuk

August 14 23	Sacramento Republic FC	2–0	El Paso Locomotive FC	Sacramento, California
7:30 PM	Sanchez (yellow card) 26'; Phillips 31'; Ukaegbu (yellow card) 42'; Gurr (yellow card) 45+2'; Donovan (yellow card) 76'; Timmer 85'	Report	Dollenmayer (yellow card) 17'; Coronado (yellow card) 38'; Akinyode (yellow card) 43'; Moreno (yellow card) 44'; Calvillo (yellow card) 73'	Stadium: Heart Health Park; Attendance: 8,688; Referee: Trevor Wiseman

August 24 24	Sacramento Republic FC	1–0	San Antonio FC	Sacramento, California
7:00 PM	Portillo (yellow card) 45+1'; Timmer (yellow card) 69'; Cicerone 86' (pen.), (yellow card) 90+2'; Ross (yellow card) 90'	Report	Haakenson (yellow card) 83'; Manley (yellow card) 85'; Hernández (yellow card) 90+2'	Stadium: Heart Health Park; Attendance: 11,569; Referee: Nabil Bensalah

===== September =====
September 7 25	Charleston Battery	2–1	Sacramento Republic FC	Mount Pleasant, South Carolina
	Torres (yellow card) 45+1'; Markanich 50'; Chapman (yellow card) 79'; Ycaza 87'; Smith (yellow card) 90+2'; Molloy (yellow card) 90+7'	Report	Sanchez 18'; Desmond (yellow card) 63'; Portillo (yellow card) 66'; Ross (yellow card) 73'; Gurr (yellow card) 88'	Stadium: Patriots Point Soccer Complex; Attendance: 3,525; Referee: Alyssa Nichols

September 14 26	Sacramento Republic FC	2-0	Phoenix Rising FC	Sacramento, California
	Herrera 7' (yellow card) 26'; Felipe (yellow card) 27'; Phillips 67'; Sanchez (yellow card) 73'; Vitiello (yellow card) 78'; Desmond (yellow card) 90+5'	Report	Wyke (yellow card) 25'; Fuenmayor (yellow card) 48'; Hernández (yellow card) 77'; Formella (yellow card) 90+5'; Traore (yellow card) 90+6'	Stadium: Heart Health Park; Attendance: 11,569; Referee: Matthew Thompson

September 18 27	New Mexico United	3-1	Sacramento Republic FC	Albuquerque, New Mexico
6:00 PM	Micaletto (yellow card) 36'; Mohamed 61'; Hurst 66', 74'; Houssou (yellow card) 71'	Report	Fernandes (yellow card) 42'; Herrera (yellow card) 89' (goal) 90+1'	Stadium: Isotopes Park; Attendance: 7,193; Referee: Greg Dopka

September 21 28	Las Vegas Lights FC	2-1	Sacramento Republic FC	Las Vegas, Nevada
7:30 PM	Bennett 29'; Noël (yellow card) 59'; Pinzon 71'; Jabang (yellow card) 73'	Report	Phillips 9'; Ukaegbu (red card) 76'; Portillo (yellow card) 81'; Viader (yellow card) 90+1'	Stadium: Cashman Field; Attendance: 2,240; Referee: Matthew Corrigan

September 29 29	Sacramento Republic FC	4-0	New Mexico United	Sacramento, California
5:30 PM	Cicerone (yellow card) 3' (goal) 6'; Fernandes 25'; Portillo (yellow card) 34'; Timmer (yellow card) 38'; Aldair Sanchez 54'; Phillips 69'	Report	Ryden (yellow card) 45+2'	Stadium: Heart Health Park; Attendance: 11,569; Referee: Brandon Stevis

===== October =====
October 5 30	San Antonio FC	2-1	Sacramento Republic FC	San Antonio, Texas
5:30 PM	Manley 49'; Blanco (yellow card) 78'; Timmer 84' (o.g.)	Report	Phillips 4'; Parano (yellow card) 12'; Timmer (yellow card) 22'; Amann (yellow card) 68'	Stadium: Toyota Field; Referee: Elvis Osmanovic

October 9 31	Sacramento Republic FC	2-2	Monterey Bay FC	Sacramento, California
7:00 PM	Parano 15'; Ross (yellow card) 68' (goal) 78'; Cicerone (yellow card) 89'; Neville (yellow card) 90+1'	Report	Gnaulati 21'; Doner 90+3'; Martinez (yellow card) 90+4'	Stadium: Heart Health Park; Attendance: 8,988; Referee: Trevor Wiseman

October 12 32	Memphis 901 FC	0-0	Sacramento Republic FC	Memphis, Tennessee
7:00 PM	Cissoko (yellow card) 6'; Duncan (yellow card) 11'; Jimenez (yellow card) 24'; Lapa (yellow card) 26'; Marlon (yellow card) 68'; Yacoubou (yellow card) 72'	Report	Neville (yellow card) 30'; Viader (yellow card) 39'	Stadium: AutoZone Park; Attendance: 4,688; Referee: Lorenzo Hernandez

October 19 33	El Paso Locomotive FC	2-1	Sacramento Republic FC	El Paso, Texas
	Ortiz (yellow card) 20'; Stauffer 26' (yellow card) 90+3'; Dollenmayer (yellow card) 27'; Alfaro 32'	Report	Portillo (yellow card) 11'; Donovan (yellow card) 14'; Phillips 28'; Timmer (yellow card) 45+3'; Fernandes (yellow card) 80'	Stadium: Southwest University Park; Attendance: 6,376; Referee: Joe Surgan

October 26 34	Sacramento Republic FC	0-1	Colorado Springs Switchbacks FC	Sacramento, California
7:00 PM	Viader (yellow card) 57'; Cicerone (yellow card) 68'	Report	Williams (yellow card) 23'; Hanya (yellow card) 36'; Magee (yellow card) 44'; Zandi (yellow card) 51'; Tejada 85'	Stadium: Heart Health Park; Attendance: 11,569; Referee: Ricardo Montero

==== USL Cup playoffs ====
November 1, 2024 West	Las Vegas Lights FC	0–0 (a.e.t.) (3–2 p)	Sacramento Republic FC	Las Vegas, Nevada
7:30 PM PDT	Noël (yellow card) 38'	Report	Ross (yellow card) 86'	Stadium: Cashman Field; Referee: Elton Garcia
	Penalties
	Bennett (penalty missed); Ngando (penalty missed); Gannon (penalty scored); Doody (penalty scored); Noël (penalty scored)		(penalty missed) Portillo; (penalty missed) Viader; (penalty missed) Cicerone; (penalty scored) Ross; (penalty scored) Felipe

=== U.S. Open Cup ===
As a member of the USL Championship, Orange County entered the U.S. Open Cup in the Round of 32. It was announced by the U.S. Soccer Federation on April 18, 2024, that Orange County would face off against fellow USL Championship team Monterey Bay FC at home.

May 7 Round of 32	Sacramento Republic FC (California)	2–0	(California) Monterey Bay FC	Sacramento, California
19:30 PDT	Greene 27' (o.g.); Phillips 31'; López (yellow card) 36'	Report	Guerrero (yellow card) 22'; Robinson (yellow card) 60'	Stadium: Heart Health Park; Attendance: 2,900; Referee: Thomas Supple

May 21 Round of 16	Sacramento Republic FC (California)	4–3 (a.e.t.)	(California) San Jose Earthquakes	Sacramento, California
19:00 PDT	Phillips 17', 38'; López (yellow card) 56'; Amann (yellow card) 70'; Luis Felipe (yellow card) 79'; 106'; Herrera 107'	Report	Judd 11' (yellow card) 56'; Espinoza 80' (yellow card) 104'; López 100'	Stadium: Heart Health Park; Attendance: 5,817; Referee: Allen Chapman

July 9 Quarterfinals	Sacramento Republic FC (California)	1–2	(Washington (state)) Seattle Sounders FC	Sacramento, California
20:00 PDT	Ross (yellow card) 5'; Herrera 49'; Parano (yellow card) 50'; Gurr (yellow card) 56'	Report	Atencio 16'; Morris 31'	Stadium: Heart Health Park
