= 2025 Sacramento Republic FC season =

Sacramento Republic FC 2025 soccer season

Sacramento Republic FC
2025 season
- Owner: Wilton Rancheria
- Head coach: Neill Collins
- Stadium: Heart Health Park
- USL Championship: Conference: 2nd Overall: 4th
- USLC Playoffs: Conference Quarter-Finals
- U.S. Open Cup: Round of 32
- USL Cup: Runner-ups
- Top goalscorer: Russell Cicerone (8)
- Highest home attendance: 11,569 (October 25, against Miami FC)
- Lowest home attendance: 8,176 (June 7, against FC Tulsa)
- Average home league attendance: 9,829
Home colors	Away colors	Third colors

The 2025 Sacramento Republic FC season was the club's twelfth season in existence. The club plays in the USL Championship, the second tier of the American soccer pyramid. Sacramento Republic FC competes in the Western Conference of the USL Championship.

Over the offseason, the Republic underwent a coaching change, having replaced Mark Briggs after five years coaching the team with Neill Collins, following a first-round exit in the 2024 USL Championship playoffs.

== Roster ==
As of February 12, 2025

Note: Flags indicate national team as defined under FIFA eligibility rules; some limited exceptions apply. Players may hold more than one non-FIFA nationality.

No.	Pos.	Nation	Player
1	GK	USA	Danny Vitiello
2	DF	ENG	Jack Gurr
3	DF	USA	Ryan Spaulding
4	DF	IRL	Lee Desmond
5	DF	USA	Jared Timmer
6	DF	USA	Freddy Kleemann
7	FW	USA	Trevor Amann
8	MF	USA	Rodrigo López (captain)
9	FW	COL	Sebastián Herrera
10	FW	ARG	Cristian Parano
11	FW	USA	Russell Cicerone
14	FW	MEX	Da'vian Kimbrough

No.	Pos.	Nation	Player
17	MF	GER	Dominik Wanner
19	MF	SCO	Nick Ross
20	MF	USA	Blake Willey
21	DF	FRA	Rayan Djedje
22	DF	MEX	Michel Benítez
23	DF	USA	AJ Edwards
24	FW	SCO	Lewis Jamieson
43	MF	USA	Justin Portillo
55	DF	USA	Chibuike Ukaegbu
96	MF	USA	Luis Felipe
99	GK	USA	Jared Mazzola

1. USL Academy Contract

=== Technical staff ===
Position	Name
General manager	(United States) Todd Dunivant
Head coach	(England) Neill Collins
Assistant coach	(England) Martín Vásquez
Goalkeeping coach	(United States) Bradley Johnson
Strength and conditioning coach	(United States) Luke Rayfield
Head athletic trainer	(United States) Dave Redman

== Competitions ==
=== USL Championship ===
==== Table ====
Pos	Team	Pld	W	L	T	GF	GA	GD	Pts	Qualification
1	FC Tulsa	30	16	5	9	50	30	+20	57	Playoffs
2	Sacramento Republic FC	30	13	8	9	44	27	+17	48 (Note: Sacramento Republic FC are ahead of New Mexico United on head-to-head points: SAC 6, NMU 0.)	Playoffs
3	New Mexico United	30	14	10	6	45	41	+4	48	Playoffs
4	El Paso Locomotive FC	30	10	9	11	47	45	+2	41	Playoffs
5	Phoenix Rising FC	30	9	8	13	48	48	0	40 (Note: Phoenix Rising FC are ahead of San Antonio FC on head-to-head points: PHX 6, SAN 0.)	Playoffs

Source: USL Championship Standings
Rules for classification: 1) head-to-head points; 2) head-to-head goal differential; 3) points-per-game within conference; 4) total wins; 5) total goal differential; 6) total goals scored; 7) points earned against top four Conference finishers; 8) disciplinary points; 9) coin toss or drawing of lots

==== Match results ====
On December 19, 2024, the USL Championship released the regular season schedule for all 24 teams.

All times are in Pacific Standard Time.

===== March =====
March 8, 2025 1	Sacramento Republic FC	2−1	New Mexico United	Sacramento, California
7:00 PM				Stadium: Heart Health Park

March 22, 2025 2	Sacramento Republic FC	2−2	Colorado Springs Switchbacks FC	Sacramento, California
7:00 PM				Stadium: Heart Health Park

March 28, 2025 3	FC Tulsa	1−0	Sacramento Republic FC	Tulsa, Oklahoma
5:00 PM				Stadium: ONEOK Field

===== April =====
April 5, 2025 4	Sacramento Republic FC	1–1	Louisville City FC	Sacramento, California
7:00 PM	Parano 69'	Report	Dia 90'+8'	Stadium: Heart Health Park; Attendance: 9,880; Referee: Matthew Corrigan

April 12, 2025 5	Orange County SC	2–1	Sacramento Republic FC	Irvine, California
7:00 PM	Vitiello 18' (o.g.); Willey 48' (o.g.)	Report	Herrera 56'	Stadium: Championship Soccer Stadium; Attendance: 3,606; Referee: Elton García

April 19, 2025 6	Phoenix Rising FC	2–2	Sacramento Republic FC	Phoenix, Arizona
1:00 PM	Margaritha 37'; Rivera 78'	Report	Herrera 18'; Wanner 34'	Stadium: Phoenix Rising Soccer Stadium; Attendance: 4,423; Referee: Nabil Bensalah

===== May =====
May 4, 2025 7	Oakland Roots SC	0–1	Sacramento Republic FC	Oakland, California
4:00 PM		Report	Cicerone 48' (pen.)	Stadium: Oakland Coliseum; Attendance: 10,599; Referee: Brandon Stevis
Note: Originally set for May 3, but changed to May 4 to accommodate broadcasting on CBS.

May 10, 2025 8	Sacramento Republic FC	1–1	Indy Eleven	Sacramento, California
7:00 PM	Timmer (yellow card) 17'; Parano (yellow card) 33'; Amann 90+6' (pen.)	Report	O'Brien (yellow card) 20'; Amoh 36'; Musa (yellow card) 58'	Stadium: Heart Health Park; Attendance: 9,358; Referee: Benjamin Meyer

May 17, 2025 9	Sacramento Republic FC	5–0	Las Vegas Lights FC	Sacramento, California
7:00 PM	Herrera 30'; Gurr 36'; Jamieson 44'; Ross 66' (pen.); Amann 86'	Report		Stadium: Heart Health Park; Attendance: 10,194; Referee: Corbyn May

===== June =====
June 7, 2025 10	Sacramento Republic FC	0−1	FC Tulsa	Sacramento, California
7:00 PM PDT		Report	ElMedkhar 10'	Stadium: Heart Health Park; Attendance: 8,176; Referee: Elijio Arreguin

June 14, 2025 11	Sacramento Republic FC	0−0	San Antonio FC	Sacramento, California
8:00 PM		Report		Stadium: Heart Health Park; Attendance: 9,379; Referee: Brandon Stevis

June 18, 2025 12	Birmingham Legion FC	1−0	Sacramento Republic FC	Birmingham, Alabama
5:00 PM	Tregarthen 90'+4'	Report		Stadium: Protective Field; Referee: Alyssa Nichols

June 21, 2025 14	Rhode Island FC	0–2	Sacramento Republic FC	Pawtucket, Rhode Island
7:00PM	Yao (yellow card) 53'	Report	Gurr (yellow card) 31'; Benítez (yellow card) 49'; López 55'; Parano 63' (yellow card) 71'	Stadium: Centreville Bank Stadium; Attendance: 7,595; Referee: Nabil Bensalah

===== July =====
July 4, 2025 14	Las Vegas Lights FC	0−2	Sacramento Republic FC	Las Vegas, Nevada
7:00 PM	Jones (yellow card) 4'; Boudadi (yellow card) 20'; Leal (yellow card) 45+1'; Nigro (yellow card) 78'	Report	Lopez (yellow card) 22'; Edwards 50'; Kleemann (yellow card) 53'; Cicerone 67'	Stadium: Cashman Field; Attendance: 3,538; Referee: Muhammad Hassan

July 12, 2025 15	Sacramento Republic FC	3–0	El Paso Locomotive FC	Sacramento, California
8:00 PM	Herrera 44'; Benítez 75'; Parano 90'+2'	Report		Stadium: Heart Health Park; Attendance: 8,196; Referee: Cristian Campo Hernández

July 19, 2025 16	Sacramento Republic FC	0–0	Lexington SC	Sacramento, California
8:00 PM		Report	Wu (yellow card) 22' (yellow-red card) 37'	Stadium: Heart Health Park; Attendance: 9,880; Referee: Joseph Dickerson

===== August =====
August 2, 2025 17	San Antonio FC	1–3	Sacramento Republic FC	San Antonio, Texas
6:00 PM	Pacheco 34'	Report	Desmond 33'; Bennett 82'; Parano 90'+1'	Stadium: Toyota Field; Attendance: 5,494; Referee: Atahan Yaya

August 9, 2025 18	Sacramento Republic FC	1–0	Monterey Bay FC	Sacramento, California
8:00 PM	López 36'	Report		Stadium: Heart Health Park; Attendance: 8,563; Referee: Elvis Osmanovic

August 16, 2025 19	Sacramento Republic FC	3–3	Oakland Roots SC	Sacramento, California
8:00 PM	López 17'; Parano 33'; Cicerone 54'	Report	Gomez 10'; Wilson 45'; Damm 87'	Stadium: Heart Health Park; Attendance: 11,569; Referee: Matthew Corrigan

August 23, 2025 20	El Paso Locomotive FC	1–0	Sacramento Republic FC	El Paso, Texas
6:00 PM	Torres 41'	Report		Stadium: Southwest University Park; Attendance: 6,349; Referee: Edson Carvajal

August 30, 2025 21	New Mexico United	0–2	Sacramento Republic FC	Albuquerque, New Mexico
6:00 PM		Report	Bennett 52', 69'	Stadium: Isotopes Park; Attendance: 9,752; Referee: Mark Verso

===== September =====
September 6, 2025 22	Tampa Bay Rowdies	0–2	Sacramento Republic FC	St. Petersburg, Florida
7:30 PM		Report	López 29'; Cicerone 90'+1'	Stadium: Al Lang Stadium; Attendance: 3,820; Referee: Matthew Thompson

September 13, 2025 23	Sacramento Republic FC	2–2	Phoenix Rising FC	Sacramento, California
7:00 PM	Cicerone 20'; Okello 32' (o.g.); Bennett (yellow card) 52' (yellow-red card) 75'	Report	Cabral 59' (pen.); Sacko 79'	Stadium: Heart Health Park; Attendance: 11,569; Referee: Trevor Wiseman

September 20, 2025 24	Colorado Springs Switchbacks FC	0–2	Sacramento Republic FC	Colorado Springs, Colorado
5:00 PM		Report	Jamieson 68'; Cicerone 84'	Stadium: Weidner Field; Attendance: 6,843; Referee: Jeremy Scheer

September 27, 2025 25	Monterey Bay FC	1–0	Sacramento Republic FC	Seaside, California
7:00 PM	Rebollar 71'	Report		Stadium: Cardinale Stadium; Attendance: 2,747; Referee: Corbyn May

===== October =====
October 1, 2025 26	Sacramento Republic FC	2–1	Orange County SC	Sacramento, California
7:15 PM	Wanner 7'; Bennett 87'	Report	Zubak 52' (pen.)	Stadium: Heart Health Park; Attendance: 9,088; Referee: Rodrigo Albuquerque

October 5, 2025 27	Sacramento Republic FC	v	Charleston Battery	Sacramento, California
4:00 PM		Report		Stadium: Heart Health Park
Note: Match rescheduled to October 22 due to Sacramento Republic hosting the USL Cup Final

October 11, 2025 28	Hartford Athletic	3–2	Sacramento Republic FC	Hartford, Connecticut
4:00 PM	Anderson 18'; Ngalina 38'; Jiménez 90'+4'	Report	Gurr 45'+3'; Wanner 50'; Edwards (yellow card) 84' (yellow-red card) 90'+8'	Stadium: Trinity Health Stadium; Attendance: 4,558; Referee: Brandon Stevis

October 17, 2025 29	Lexington SC	2–2	Sacramento Republic FC	Lexington, Kentucky
4:00 PM	Burke 4'; Epps 64'	Report	Parano 85'; Herrera 90'+4'	Stadium: Lexington SC Stadium; Attendance: 5,105; Referee: Thomas Snyder

October 22, 2025 27	Sacramento Republic FC	1–0	Charleston Battery	Sacramento, California
4:00 PM	Bennett 50'	Report		Stadium: Heart Health Park; Attendance: 8,779; Referee: Cristian Campo Hernández
Note: Match rescheduled from October 5 due to Sacramento Republic hosting the USL Cup Final

October 25, 2025 30	Sacramento Republic FC	0–1	Miami FC	Sacramento, California
7:00 PM		Report	Knutson 87'	Stadium: Heart Health Park; Attendance: 11,569; Referee: Joe Surgan

==== USL Championship playoffs ====
As the second seed in the Western Conference, Sacramento Republic was granted a home playoff match, being matched up against seventh-seeded Orange County SC. Playing at home, Sacramento played to a scoreless draw in both regular and added extra time, with a chaotic scuffle in front of the Sacramento bench in the first half of extra time causing captain Rodrigo Lopez to be sent off on what would ultimately be his final professional match in his career, as the Republic would ultimately fall to the Southern California-based team 5–4 in the ensuing penalty shootout.

November 2, 2025 West	Sacramento Republic FC	0–0 (a.e.t.) (4–5 p)	Orange County SC	Sacramento, California
6:00 PM PT	Portillo (yellow card) 11'; Benítez (yellow card) 75'; Willey (yellow card) 90'; López (red card) 105+3'; Cicerone (yellow card) 105+5'; Bennett (yellow card) 107'	Report	Partida (yellow card) 90+3'; Hegardt (red card) 105+3'; War (yellow card) 105+6'	Stadium: Heart Health Park; Attendance: 9,367; Referee: Nabil Bensalah
	Penalties
	Cicerone (penalty missed); Felipe (penalty missed); Ross (penalty scored); Bennett (penalty scored); Spaulding (penalty scored); Desmond (penalty scored); Gurr (penalty missed)		(penalty missed) Zubak; (penalty scored) Dunbar; (penalty scored) Pinto; (penalty missed) Latinovich; (penalty scored) Sylla; (penalty scored) Benalcazar; (penalty scored) Brewitt

=== USL Cup ===
Sacramento Republic participated in the second edition of the USL Cup, the first edition to feature teams from both the USL Championship and League One.

==== Standings ====
Pos	Lg	Team	Pld	W	PKW	PKL	L	GF	GA	GD	Pts	Qualification
1	USLC	Sacramento Republic FC	4	3	0	0	1	6	1	+5	9	Advance to knockout stage
2	USLC	Las Vegas Lights FC	4	3	0	0	1	7	6	+1	9	
3	USLC	Monterey Bay FC	4	2	0	0	2	6	6	0	6	
4	USLC	Orange County SC	4	2	0	0	2	5	6	−1	6	
5	USL1	AV Alta FC	4	1	1	0	2	5	6	−1	5	

Updated to match(es) played on July 26, 2025. Source: USL

==== Group stage ====
April 26, 2025	Sacramento Republic FC	1–0	AV Alta FC	Sacramento, California
7:00 PM PDT	Herrera 45+1'	Report		Stadium: Heart Health Park; Attendance: 8,898; Referee: Servando Berna Rico

May 31, 2025	Sacramento Republic FC	4–0	Las Vegas Lights FC	Sacramento, California
7:00 PM PDT	Spaulding 36'; Parano 37'; Benítez 53'; Cicerone 58'	Report		Stadium: Heart Health Park; Attendance: 9,437; Referee: Abdou Ndiaye

June 28, 2025	Orange County SC	1–0	Sacramento Republic FC	Irvine, California
7:00 PM PDT	Pedro Guimaraes 90+5'	Report		Stadium: Championship Soccer Stadium; Attendance: 4,328; Referee: Muhammad Kaleia

July 26, 2025	Spokane Velocity FC	0–1	Sacramento Republic FC	Spokane, Washington
7:00 PM PDT		Report	Benítez 10'	Stadium: One Spokane Stadium; Attendance: 3,068; Referee: Brad Jensen

==== Playoffs ====
August 20 Quarter-finals	Loudoun United FC	0−0 (2−4 p)	Sacramento Republic FC	Leesburg, Virginia
7:00 PM EDT		Report		Stadium: Segra Field; Attendance: 1,057; Referee: Abdou Ndiaye

September 10 Semi-finals	Rhode Island FC	0–0 (0–3 p)	Sacramento Republic FC	Pawtucket, Rhode Island
7:00 PM EDT		Report		Stadium: Centreville Bank Stadium; Attendance: 4,899; Referee: Greg Dopka
	Penalties
	Rodriguez (penalty missed); Williams (penalty missed); Fuson (penalty missed)		(penalty scored) López; (penalty scored) Cicerone; (penalty scored) Benítez

October 4 Final	Sacramento Republic FC	0–1	Hartford Athletic	Sacramento, California
7:00 PM PDT		Report	Careaga 51'	Stadium: Heart Health Park; Attendance: 11,569; Referee: Matthew Corrigan

==== US Open Cup ====
The Republic, as a member of the second division USL Championship, entered the U.S. Open Cup in the Third Round based on its performance in the 2024 USL Championship season. Drawn at home against the last amateur club in the competition, El Farolito SC of the NPSL, the club won 1–0 to advance to the Round of 32, where they lost away to MLS club San Jose Earthquakes 2–1.

April 16	Sacramento Republic FC (USLC) (California)	1–0	(California) El Farolito SC (NPSL)	Sacramento, California
7:00 p.m. PDT	Herrera 29'	Report		Stadium: Heart Health Park; Attendance: 2,727; Referee: Robert Vincze

May 7, 2025	San Jose Earthquakes (California)	2–1	(California) Sacramento Republic FC	San Jose, California
7:30 p.m. PDT	Pellegrino 2'; Judd 44'	Report	Amann 90+6'	Stadium: PayPal Park; Attendance: 9,327; Referee: Ekaterina Koroleva
