= 2026 Sacramento Republic FC season =

Sacramento Republic FC 2026 soccer season

Sacramento Republic FC
2026 season
- Owner: Wilton Rancheria
- Head coach: Neill Collins
- Stadium: Heart Health Park
- USL Championship: Conference: 2nd Overall: 4th
- USLC Playoffs: Champions
- U.S. Open Cup: Round of 32
- USL Cup: Group stage
Home colors	Away colors	Third colors

The 2026 Sacramento Republic FC season is the club's thirteenth season in existence. The club plays in the USL Championship, the second tier of the American soccer pyramid. Sacramento Republic FC competes in the Western Conference of the USL Championship.

== Roster ==
As of January 23, 2026

Note: Flags indicate national team as defined under FIFA eligibility rules; some limited exceptions apply. Players may hold more than one non-FIFA nationality.

No.	Pos.	Nation	Player
1	GK	USA	Danny Vitiello
2	DF	ENG	Jack Gurr
3	DF	USA	Ryan Spaulding
4	DF	IRL	Lee Desmond
5	DF	USA	Jared Timmer
6	DF	USA	Freddy Kleemann
8	MF	USA	Rodrigo López (captain)
9	FW	COL	Sebastián Herrera
10	FW	ARG	Cristian Parano
11	FW	USA	Russell Cicerone
14	FW	MEX	Da'vian Kimbrough
15	DF	USA	Cody Baker (on loan from Seattle Sounders)

No.	Pos.	Nation	Player
17	MF	GER	Dominik Wanner
20	MF	USA	Blake Willey
21	DF	FRA	Rayan Djedje
22	DF	MEX	Michelle Benítez
23	DF	USA	AJ Edwards
43	MF	USA	Justin Portillo
55	DF	USA	Chibuike Ukaegbu
90	FW	JAM	Khori Bennett
96	MF	USA	Luis Felipe
99	GK	USA	Jared Mazzola
—	FW	MAW	Mayele Malango

1. USL Academy Contract

=== Technical staff ===
Position	Name
General manager	(United States) Todd Dunivant
Head coach	(England) Neill Collins
Assistant coach	(England) Martín Vásquez
Goalkeeping coach	(United States) Bradley Johnson
Strength and conditioning coach	(United States) Luke Rayfield
Head athletic trainer	(United States) Dave Redman

== Competitions ==
=== USL Championship ===
==== Table ====
Pos	Team	Pld	W	L	T	GF	GA	GD	Pts	Qualification
1	New Mexico United	30	15	8	7	45	34	+11	52	Playoffs
2	Sacramento Republic FC (C)	30	13	5	12	42	28	+14	51	Playoffs
3	El Paso Locomotive FC	30	15	10	5	48	38	+10	50	Playoffs
4	Lexington SC	30	14	10	6	57	39	+18	48	Playoffs
5	Colorado Springs Switchbacks FC	30	13	9	8	44	38	+6	47	Playoffs

Updated to match(es) played on October 24, 2026. Source: USL Championship Standings
Rules for classification: 1) total wins against conference opponents; 2) goal differential against conference opponents; 3) goals scored against conference opponents; 4) head-to-head points against conference opponents; 5) points per game against conference opponents; 6) points per game against non-conference opponents; 7) fewest disciplinary points; 8) coin toss or drawing of lots
(C) Champions

==== Match results ====
On December 16, 2025, the USL Championship released the schedule for all 25 teams for both the regular season and the USL Cup.

All times are in Pacific Standard Time.

March 7, 2026 1	Sacramento Republic FC	2–0	FC Tulsa	Sacramento, California
7:00 PM	Kleemann 68'; Edwards 83'	Report		Stadium: Heart Health Park; Attendance: 11,569; Referee: Greg Dopka

March 14, 2026 2	Lexington SC	0–0	Sacramento Republic FC	Lexington, Kentucky
4:00 PM		Report		Stadium: Lexington SC Stadium; Attendance: 5,585; Referee: Matthew Thompson

March 21, 2026 3	Sacramento Republic FC	1–1	Monterey Bay FC	Sacramento, California
7:00 PM	Ajago 62'	Report	Leggett 84'	Stadium: Heart Health Park; Attendance: 9,516; Referee: Rodrigo Albuquerque

March 28, 2026 4	Sacramento Republic FC	1–2	El Paso Locomotive FC	Sacramento, California
7:00 PM	Benítez 90+2' (pen.)	Report	Moreno 25'; Méndez 37' (pen.); Calvillo (yellow card) 44' (yellow-red card) 55'	Stadium: Heart Health Park; Attendance: 8,072; Referee: Trevor Wiseman

April 4, 2026 5	Sacramento Republic FC	2-0	Phoenix Rising FC	Sacramento, California
7:00 PM	Willey 10' Wanner 24'	Report		Stadium: Heart Health Park; Attendance: 9,308; Referee: Muhammad Hassan

April 11, 2026 6	Las Vegas Lights FC	1–1	Sacramento Republic FC	Las Vegas, Nevada
7:30 PM	Guillen 20'	Report	Kaye 30'	Stadium: Cashman Field; Attendance: 3,081; Referee: Ramy Touchan

April 21, 2026 7	Brooklyn FC	1–1	Sacramento Republic FC	Brooklyn, New York
4:00 PM	Anderson 27'; Alves (yellow card) 61' (yellow-red card) 90+5'	Report	Benítez 90+6' (pen.)	Stadium: Maimonides Park; Attendance: 628; Referee: John Matto

May 2, 2026 8	Sacramento Republic FC	3–2	Orange County SC	Sacramento, CA
7:00 p.m.	Rodríguez 57'; Edwards 88'; Benítez 90+5'	Report	Kelly 22'; Bazini 73'	Stadium: Heart Health Park; Attendance: 10,248; Referee: Jeremy Scheer

May 23, 2026 9	San Antonio FC	2-1	Sacramento Republic FC	San Antonio, Texas
7:30 PM	Christian Sorto 27'; Dmitri Erofeev 33'	Report	Forster Ajago 55'	Stadium: Toyota Field; Attendance: 5,676; Referee: Robert Vincze

May 30, 2026 10	Phoenix Rising FC	2–0	Sacramento Republic FC	Phoenix, Arizona
7:30 PM	Sacko 39' (pen.), 45+4' (pen.)	Report		Stadium: Phoenix Rising Soccer Stadium; Attendance: 5,294; Referee: John Griggs

June 13, 2026 11	Colorado Springs Switchbacks FC	0–1	Sacramento Republic FC	Colorado Springs, Colorado
6:00 PM		Report	Gurr 66'	Stadium: Weidner Field; Attendance: 6,724; Referee: Gerald Flores

June 20, 2026 12	Sacramento Republic FC	0–1	New Mexico United	Sacramento, California
8:00 PM		Report	Harris 73'	Stadium: Heart Health Park; Attendance: 10,777; Referee: Nabil Bensalah

July 4, 2026 13	FC Tulsa	v	Sacramento Republic FC	Tulsa, Oklahoma
5:30 PM		Report		Stadium: ONEOK Field
Note: Postponed due to inclement weather.

July 8, 2026 14	Sacramento Republic FC	2–1	Rhode Island FC	Sacramento, California
7:30 PM	K. Edwards 19'; Malango 44'	Report	Bacharach 24'	Stadium: Heart Health Park; Attendance: 8,436; Referee: Elvis Osmanovic

July 18, 2026 15	Charleston Battery	1–1	Sacramento Republic FC	Mt. Pleasant, South Carolina
4:30 PM	Ycaza 73' (pen.)	Report	Ajago 48', (yellow card) 24' (yellow-red card) 75'	Stadium: Patriots Point Soccer Complex; Attendance: 4,047; Referee: Matthew Corrigan

July 25, 2026 16	Oakland Roots SC	1–3	Sacramento Republic FC	Oakland, California
7:00 PM	Valot 21'	Report	Rodríguez 19'; Edwards 75', 90+1'	Stadium: Oakland Coliseum; Attendance: 6,986; Referee: Joshua Encarnación

August 1, 2026 17	Sacramento Republic FC	5–0	Sporting Club Jacksonville	Sacramento, California
8:00 PM	Wolff 7', 40', 69'; Timmer 38'; Desmond 43'	Report		Stadium: Heart Health Park; Attendance: 10,026; Referee: Steven Cardozo

August 8, 2026 18	Pittsburgh Riverhounds SC	0–0	Sacramento Republic FC	Pittsburgh, Pennsylvania
4:00 PM		Report		Stadium: Highmark Stadium; Attendance: 5,251; Referee: Matthew Thompson

August 15, 2026 19	Sacramento Republic FC	1–0	Lexington SC	Sacramento, California
8:00 PM	Edwards 87'	Report		Stadium: Heart Health Park; Attendance: 11,126; Referee: Gerald Flores

August 22, 2026 20	Sacramento Republic FC	2–2	Phoenix Rising FC	Sacramento, California
8:00 PM	Wolff 19'; Rodríguez 26'	Report	Sacko 45', 85'	Stadium: Heart Health Park; Attendance: 9,788; Referee: Amin Hadzic

August 29, 2026 21	Monterey Bay FC	1–1	Sacramento Republic FC	Seaside, California
7:00 PM	Glasgow 44'	Report	Jennings 84'	Stadium: Cardinale Stadium; Attendance: 4,615; Referee: Corbyn May

September 5, 2026 22	Orange County SC	1–1	Sacramento Republic FC	Irvine, California
7:00 PM	Hegardt 61'	Report	Essel 83'	Stadium: Championship Soccer Stadium; Attendance: 4,193; Referee: Servando Berna Rico

September 12, 2026 23	Sacramento Republic FC	1–0	Detroit City FC	Sacramento, California
7:00 PM	Timmer 14'	Report		Stadium: Heart Health Park; Attendance: 10,005; Referee: Elton García

September 20, 2026 24	Sacramento Republic FC	0–0	San Antonio FC	Sacramento, California
4:00 PM		Report		Stadium: Heart Health Park; Attendance: 11,569; Referee: Joshua Encarnación

September 26, 2026 25	New Mexico United	2–3	Sacramento Republic FC	Albuquerque, New Mexico
6:00 PM	Hurst 73'; Archimede 85'	Report	Rodríguez 12' (pen.), 49'; Edwards 78'	Stadium: Isotopes Park; Attendance: 10,067; Referee: Rodrigo Albuquerque

September 30, 2026 26	Sacramento Republic FC	3–2	Las Vegas Lights FC	Sacramento, California
7:00 PM	Rodríguez 36'; Wolff 58'; Edwards 82'	Report	Anderson 13'; Locker 50'	Stadium: Heart Health Park; Attendance: 8,407; Referee: Jeremy Scheer

October 3, 2026 27	FC Tulsa	1–1	Sacramento Republic FC	Tulsa, Oklahoma
5:00 PM	Ordóñez 9' (pen.)	Report	Rodríguez 89'	Stadium: ONEOK Field; Attendance: 4,695; Referee: Elvis Osmanovic

October 10, 2026 28	Sacramento Republic FC	1–1	Colorado Springs Switchbacks FC	Sacramento, California
7:00 PM	Edwards 75' (pen.)	Report	Maples 48'	Stadium: Heart Health Park; Attendance: 11,569; Referee: Alyssa Pennington

October 17, 2026 29	El Paso Locomotive FC	0–1	Sacramento Republic FC	El Paso, Texas
6:00 PM		Report	Rodríguez 87'	Stadium: Southwest University Park; Attendance: 5,210; Referee: Matthew Thompson

October 24, 2026 30	Sacramento Republic FC	v	Oakland Roots SC	Sacramento, California
7:00 PM				Stadium: Heart Health Park

=== US Open Cup ===
Sacramento Republic entered the 2026 US Open Cup at home against El Farolito, an amateur club that plays in the National Premier Soccer League. Despite the Republic's victory in extra time, the match was marred by controversy after tempers flared both on and off the pitch, and Farolito players entered the stands of Heart Health Park to confront heckling Republic fans. Following their first round victory, the Republic were matched up away against Valley 559 FC of Fresno, where they ultimately cruised to a four-goal victory. For the Round of 32, the Republic are scheduled at home against first-division MLS club Minnesota United FC.

March 18 First Round	(California) Sacramento Republic FC (USLC)	2–0 (a.e.t.)	(California) El Farolito (NPSL)	Sacramento, California
7:00 PM PT	Ajago 95', 120+2'	Report		Stadium: Heart Health Park; Attendance: 2,430; Referee: Steven Cardozo

March 31 Second Round	Valley 559 FC (UPSL) (California)	0–4	(California) Sacramento Republic FC (USLC)	Clovis, California
7:00 p.m.		Report	Desmond 11'; Wanner 36'; Edwards 38', 64'	Stadium: Clovis East High School; Referee: Robert Vincze

April 14 Round of 32	(California) Sacramento Republic FC (USLC)	0–0 (a.e.t.) (8–9 p)	Minnesota United FC (MLS)	Sacramento, California
7:00 PM PT		Report		Stadium: Heart Health Park; Attendance: 7,513; Referee: Robert Vincze
	Penalties
	Wanner (penalty scored); Benítez (penalty scored); Essel (penalty missed); Rivas (penalty scored); Cambridge (penalty missed); Ajago (penalty scored); Rodriguez (penalty scored); Desmond (penalty scored); Kleemann (penalty scored); Ukaegbu (penalty scored); Vitiello (penalty missed); Wanner (penalty missed)		(penalty scored) Pereyra; (penalty scored) Chancalay; (penalty missed) Gene; (penalty scored) Triantis; (penalty missed) Markanich; (penalty scored) Trapp; (penalty scored) Harvey; (penalty scored) Díaz; (penalty scored) Gonzalez; (penalty scored) Padelford; (penalty missed) Smir; (penalty scored) Pereyra

=== USL Cup ===
Sacramento Republic participated in the third edition of the USL Cup, and the second edition to feature teams from both the USL Championship and League One.

==== Standings ====
Pos	Lg	Team	Pld	W	PKW	PKL	L	GF	GA	GD	Pts	Qualification
1	USL1	Spokane Velocity FC	4	3	0	0	1	6	6	0	9	Advance to knockout stage
2	USL1	AC Boise	4	2	1	0	1	8	6	+2	8	
3	USLC	Sacramento Republic FC	4	2	1	0	1	6	3	+3	8	
4	USLC	Oakland Roots SC	4	1	0	1	2	4	5	−1	4	
5	USLC	Las Vegas Lights FC	4	1	0	1	2	4	6	−2	4	

==== Group stage ====
April 25, 2026	Sacramento Republic FC	4–0	Spokane Velocity FC	Sacramento, California
7:00 PM	Wolff 5'; Malango 45+4', 56'; Benítez 81'	Report		Stadium: Heart Health Park; Referee: Carlos Rodriguez

May 16, 2026	Oakland Roots SC	0–1	Sacramento Republic FC	Oakland, California
5:00 PM		Report	Malango 56'	Stadium: Oakland-Alameda County Coliseum; Attendance: 5,669; Referee: Matthew Corrigan

June 6, 2026	Sacramento Republic FC	1–1 (5–3 p)	Monterey Bay FC	Sacramento, California
8:00 PM	Benítez 60' (pen.)	Report	Bidois 55'	Stadium: Heart Health Park; Attendance: 9,425; Referee: Calin Radosav
	Penalties
	Kaye (penalty scored); Benítez (penalty scored); Desmond (penalty scored); Malango (penalty scored); Spaulding (penalty scored)		(penalty scored) Blancas; (penalty missed) Paul; (penalty scored) Glasgow; (penalty scored) Leggett

July 11, 2027	Athletic Club Boise	2–0	Sacramento Republic FC	Garden City, Idaho
7:30 p.m.	Moon 7'; Moshobane 64'	Report		Stadium: Stadium at Expo Idaho; Attendance: 7,247; Referee: Brandon Stevis
