= 2023 Sacramento Republic FC season =

Sacramento Republic FC
2023 season
- Owner: Kevin M. Nagle
- Head coach: Mark Briggs
- Stadium: Heart Health Park
- USL Championship: Conference: Overall:
- U.S. Open Cup: Round of 32
| Home colors | Away colors | Third colors |

The 2023 Sacramento Republic FC season was the club's tenth season in existence. The club played in the USL Championship (USLC), the second tier of the American soccer pyramid. Sacramento Republic FC competed in the Western Conference of the USL Championship.

== Roster ==
As of April 4, 2023

| No. | Pos. | Nation | Player |
|---|---|---|---|
| 1 | GK | MEX | Carlos Saldaña |
| 2 | DF | ENG | Jack Gurr |
| 3 | DF | ESP | Damià Viader |
| 4 | DF | IRL | Lee Desmond |
| 5 | DF | USA | Jared Timmer |
| 6 | DF | USA | Shane Wiedt |
| 7 | MF | ESP | Keko |
| 8 | MF | USA | Rodrigo López |
| 9 | FW | COL | Sebastián Herrera |
| 10 | FW | BER | Zeiko Lewis |
| 11 | FW | USA | Russell Cicerone |
| 15 | MF | USA | Rafael Jauregui |
| 17 | FW | GLP | Luther Archimède |
| 18 | DF | ENG | Johnny Fenwick |
| 19 | MF | SCO | Nick Ross |
| 20 | MF | USA | Matt LaGrassa |
| 23 | MF | USA | Mario Penagos |
| 24 | DF | USA | Conor Donovan |
| 25 | DF | COD | Ferrety Sousa |
| 29 | MF | VEN | Arnold López |
| 31 | GK | USA | Danny Vitiello |
| 40 | DF | USA | Aldair Sanchez |
| 43 | DF | USA | Ermias Yohannes |
| 44 | MF | USA | Blake Willey |
| 45 | FW | USA | Ethan Kelly |
| 96 | MF | USA | Luis Felipe |

USL Academy contract

== Technical staff ==
As of January 28, 2022

| Position | Name |
|---|---|
| General manager | (United States) Todd Dunivant |
| Head coach | (England) Mark Briggs |
| Assistant coach | (England) Danny Dichio |
| Goalkeeping coach | (United States) Ross Cain |
| Strength and conditioning coach | (United States) Luke Rayfield |
| Head athletic trainer | (United States) Betty Olmeda |

== Competitions ==
=== Table ===
| Pos | Team | Pld | W | L | T | GF | GA | GD | Pts | Qualification |
|---|---|---|---|---|---|---|---|---|---|---|
| 1 | Sacramento Republic FC | 34 | 18 | 6 | 10 | 51 | 26 | +25 | 64 | Playoffs |
| 2 | Orange County SC | 34 | 17 | 11 | 6 | 46 | 39 | +7 | 57 | Playoffs |
| 3 | San Diego Loyal SC | 34 | 16 | 9 | 9 | 61 | 43 | +18 | 57 | Playoffs |
| 4 | San Antonio FC | 34 | 14 | 6 | 14 | 63 | 38 | +25 | 56 | Playoffs |
| 5 | Colorado Springs Switchbacks FC | 34 | 16 | 13 | 5 | 49 | 42 | +7 | 53 | Playoffs |

Source: USL Championship Standings
Rules for classification: 1) head-to-head points; 2) head-to-head goal differential; 3) points-per game within conference; 4) total wins; 5) total goal differential; 6) total goals scored; 7) points earned against top four Conference finishers; 8) disciplinary points; 9) coin toss or drawing of lots

=== March ===
| March 11th 1 - Season Opener | El Paso Locomotive FC | 0-1 | Sacramento Republic FC | El Paso, Texas |
| 6:30 PM PST | Russell Cicerone 42' | Report | | Stadium: Southwest University Park; Attendance: 7,136; Referee: Elton García |

| March 18th 2 - Home Opener | Sacramento Republic FC | 1-1 | Charleston Battery | Sacramento, California |
| 7:00 PM PST | Jack Gurr 55' | Report | AJ Paterson 22' | Stadium: Heart Health Park; Attendance: 11,569; Referee: Brad Jensen |

| March 25th 3 | Sacramento Republic FC | 1-0 | San Diego Loyal | Sacramento, California |
| 7:00 PM PST | Luis Felipe 41' | Report | | Stadium: Heart Health Park; Attendance: 9,088; Referee: Malik Badawi |

=== Second round ===
| April 5th Second Round | Sacramento Republic FC | 5-4 (a.e.t.) | Crossfire Redmond | Sacramento, California |
| 7:00 PM PST | Zeiko Lewis 81', 105'; Russell Cicerone 85', 97'; Johnny Fenwick 113' | Report | Aman 7', 111'; Stewart 13'; Hussen 93' | Stadium: Heart Health Park; Attendance: 4,024; Referee: Turan Ozdemir |

=== Third round ===
| April 26th Third Round | Sacramento Republic FC | 1-0 | Oakland Roots SC | Sacramento, California |
| 7:00 PM PST | Nick Ross 49' | Report | | Stadium: Heart Health Park; Attendance: 4,379; Referee: Laura Rodriguez |

=== Round of 32 ===
| May 9th Round of 32 | Sacramento Republic FC | 2-4 | Colorado Rapids (MLS) | Sacramento, California |
| 7:30 PM PST | Juan Sebastián Herrera 30', 52' | Report | Jonathan Lewis 4'; Michael Edwards 15'; Sam Nicholson 55'; Michael Barrios 81' | Stadium: Heart Health Park; Attendance: 8,897; Referee: Ricardo Fierro |
