= 2022 Sacramento Republic FC season =

Sacramento Republic FC
2022 season
- Owner: Kevin M. Nagle
- Head coach: Mark Briggs
- Stadium: Heart Health Park
- USL Championship: Conference: 5th Overall: 10th
- U.S. Open Cup: Final
- Highest home attendance: League/All: 11,569 (3/12 vs. ELP, USLC) (5/25 vs. SJ, USOC) (7/27 vs. SKC, USOC)
- Lowest home attendance: League: 7,835 (5/4 vs. NMU); All: 2,260 (4/7 vs. POR U23, USOC)
- Average home league attendance: 9,823
- Biggest win: SAC 6–0 POR U23 (4/7, USOC)
- Biggest defeat: COS 3–0 SAC (7/1)
Home colors	Away colors	Third colors

The 2022 Sacramento Republic FC season was the club's ninth season of existence. The club played in the USL Championship (USLC), the second tier of the American soccer pyramid. Sacramento Republic FC competed in the Western Conference of the USL Championship.

The season was highlighted by Republic FC reaching the final of the U.S. Open Cup, becoming the first non-MLS club since 2008 to do so.

== Competitions ==
=== USL Championship ===
==== Table ====
Pos	Team	Pld	W	L	T	GF	GA	GD	Pts	Qualification
2	San Diego Loyal SC	34	18	10	6	68	55	+13	60	Playoffs
3	Colorado Springs Switchbacks	34	17	13	4	59	53	+6	55	Playoffs
4	Sacramento Republic	34	15	11	8	48	34	+14	53	Playoffs
5	New Mexico United	34	13	9	12	49	40	+9	51	Playoffs
6	Rio Grande Valley Toros	34	14	13	7	51	40	+11	49	Playoffs

Source: USL Championship Standings
Rules for classification: 1) head-to-head points; 2) head-to-head goal differential; 3) points-per game within conference; 4) total wins; 5) total goal differential; 6) total goals scored; 7) points earned against top four Conference finishers; 8) disciplinary points; 9) coin toss or drawing of lots

==== Match Results ====
March 12 1	Sacramento Republic FC	3–1	El Paso Locomotive FC	Sacramento, CA
7:00 PM PDT	Casey (yellow card) 8'; López 45+5' (pen.); Ross (yellow card) 58'; Martínez 84'; Keko (yellow card) 88', (goal) 90+1'	Report	Ryan (penalty missed) 9', (yellow card) 45+4'; Sonupe 27'; Payares (yellow card) 31'; Newton (yellow card) 45+3'; Luna (yellow card) 45+4'	Stadium: Heart Health Park; Attendance: 11,569; Referee: Elton García

March 19 2	San Diego Loyal	2–0	Sacramento Republic FC	San Diego, CA
7:00 PM PDT	K. Adams 35'; Riley (yellow card) 41'; C. Adams 45'; Martin (yellow card) 68'; Hackworth (yellow card) 90+3'	Report	Luis Felipe (yellow card) 33'; Desmond (yellow card) 39'; Sousa (yellow card) 66'; López (yellow card) 74'	Stadium: Torero Stadium; Attendance: 3,900; Referee: Greg Dopka

March 27 3	Sacramento Republic FC	2–1	FC Tulsa	Sacramento, CA
2:00pm PDT	Martinez 33' (pen.); Lacroix 86'	Report	da Costa 29'	Stadium: Heart Health Park; Attendance: 8,706; Referee: Joseph Salinas

April 2 4	Sacramento Republic FC	2–1	Monterey Bay FC	Sacramento, CA
7:00 PM PDT	LaGrassa (yellow card) 23'; Keko (yellow card) 58'; López 78' (pen.); Archimède 87' (pen.)	Report	Murphy (yellow card) 54'; Greene (yellow card) 67'; Doner (yellow card) 77'; Boone 90+1'	Stadium: Heart Health Park; Attendance: 10,241; Referee: Malik Badawi

April 16 5	Orange County SC	1–1	Sacramento Republic FC	Irvine, CA
7:00 PM PDT	Torres 26' (pen.); Kuningas (yellow card) 30'; Henry (yellow card) 31'; Villanueva (yellow card) 72'; Osundina (yellow card) 90+3'	Report	Viader 2'; Gurr (yellow card) 24'; LaGrassa (yellow card) 28'; Desmond (yellow card) 58'; Cuello (yellow card) 75'; López (yellow card) 87'	Stadium: Championship Soccer Stadium; Attendance: 3,692; Referee: Melvin Rivas

April 23 6	Rio Grande Valley FC Toros	2–1	Sacramento Republic FC	Edinburg, TX
5:30 PM PDT	Martinez (yellow card) 52'; Malešević 61'; Mueller (yellow card) 70'; Cabezas (yellow card) 90'; Borczak 90+2'	Report	Lacroix (yellow card) 20'; Martínez (yellow card) 39'; Felipe (yellow card) 52'; Sousa (yellow card) 60'; López (yellow card) 63'; Donovan 72'	Stadium: H-E-B Park; Attendance: 3,635; Referee: Elton García

April 30 7	Sacramento Republic FC	1–1	Las Vegas Lights FC	Sacramento, CA
7:00 PM PDT	López (yellow card) 31'; Casey 37'	Report	Molina 17'; Daroma (yellow card) 41'; Leone (yellow card) 45'; Quezada (yellow card) 72'; Romero (yellow card) 90+5'	Stadium: Heart Health Park; Attendance: 10,078; Referee: Brad Jensen

May 4 8	Sacramento Republic FC	0–0	New Mexico United	Sacramento, CA
7:00 PM PDT	López (penalty missed) 87'	Report	Swartz (yellow card) 49'; Parker (yellow card) 86'	Stadium: Heart Health Park; Attendance: 7,835; Referee: Ricardo Fierro

May 8 9	New York Red Bulls II	0–1	Sacramento Republic FC	Montclair, NJ
10:00 AM PDT	Castillo (yellow card) 17'; Harper (yellow card) 23'; Ofori (yellow card) 26'; Murphy (yellow card) 73' (yellow-red card) 90+2'; Pendant (yellow card) 78'; Knapp (yellow card) 90+6'	Report	Donovan (yellow card) 20'; Viader (yellow card) 58'; Archimède (yellow card) 75' (yellow-red card) 90+2'; Foster 88', (yellow card) 89'	Stadium: MSU Soccer Park; Attendance: 201; Referee: Matthew Franz

May 18 10	El Paso Locomotive FC	1–0	Sacramento Republic FC	El Paso, TX
6:00 PM PDT	Solignac (yellow card) 45+2'; Fox 75'; Luna (yellow card) 77'; Yuma (yellow card) 82'; Mares (yellow card) 85'	Report	López (yellow card) 31'; Felipe (yellow card) 72'; Martínez (red card) 81'	Stadium: Southwest University Park; Attendance: 5,521; Referee: Matthew Corrigan

May 28 11	Oakland Roots SC	1–1	Sacramento Republic FC	Oakland, CA
9:00 PM PDT	Barbir (yellow card) 14'; J. Hernández (yellow card) 32'; Morad (yellow card) 37'; Formella (yellow card) 50'; Karlsson 81' (pen.); Johnsen (yellow card) 82'	Report	Felipe 42'; Keko (yellow card) 69'; Foster (yellow card) 85'	Stadium: Laney College Football Stadium; Attendance: 4,268; Referee: Greg Dopka

June 4 12	Sacramento Republic FC	1–0	San Antonio FC	Sacramento, CA
8:00 p.m. PDT	Martínez 37'; Felipe (yellow card) 45+1'; López (yellow card) 72'	Report	Garcia (yellow card) 19' (yellow-red card) 90'; PC (yellow card) 42'; Beckford (yellow card) 45+2'	Stadium: Heart Health Park; Attendance: 9,641; Referee: Michael Radchuk

June 11 13	Detroit City FC	0–2	Sacramento Republic FC	Hamtramck, MI
4:30 PM PDT	Ouimette (yellow card) 58'	Report	Viader 10'; Keko 56'; Martínez (yellow card) 64'; López (yellow card) 77'	Stadium: Keyworth Stadium; Attendance: 7,011; Referee: Austin Saini

June 18 14	Sacramento Republic FC	2–0	LA Galaxy II	Sacramento, CA
8:00 PM	Archimède 63' (pen.); Jauregui 69'; Donovan (yellow card) 73'; Ross (yellow card) 83'	Report	Sánchez (yellow card) 62'; Judd (yellow card) 73'	Stadium: Heart Health Park; Attendance: 10,691; Referee: Mark Allatin

June 25 15	Monterey Bay FC	1–2	Sacramento Republic FC	Seaside, CA
7:00 PM PDT	Volesky (yellow card) 14'; Roberts (yellow card) 20'; Lacroix 33' (o.g.)	Report	Gurr (yellow card) 14'; Foster 74', 76'	Stadium: Cardinale Stadium; Attendance: 3,604; Referee: Elijio Arreguin

July 1 16	Colorado Springs Switchbacks FC	3–0	Sacramento Republic FC	Colorado Springs, CO
7:00 PM MDT	Amoh 14'; Barry 35', 48'; Hodge (yellow card) 40'; Ockford (yellow card) 43'; Makangila (yellow card) 76'	Report	Gurr (yellow card) 54'	Stadium: Weidner Field; Attendance: 6,580; Referee: Joshua Encarnación

July 9 17	Sacramento Republic FC	3–3	Oakland Roots SC	Sacramento, CA
8:00 PM	López 11'; Foster 44'; Felipe (yellow card) 59', (goal) 90+6'; Casey (yellow card) 78'	Report	Azócar 27'; Karlsson 55', 70'; Morad (yellow card) 74'; Johnsen (yellow card) 78'	Stadium: Heart Health Park; Attendance: 10,169; Referee: Elton García

July 16 18	Sacramento Republic FC	0–1	Birmingham Legion FC	Sacramento, CA
8:00 PM	Casey (yellow card) 62'	Report	Agudelo 2', (yellow card) 67'; Asiedu (yellow card) 14'; Herivaux (yellow card) 64'; Marlon (yellow card) 71'; Kavita (yellow card) 90+3'	Stadium: Heart Health Park; Attendance: 9,161; Referee: Corbyn May

July 23 19	Phoenix Rising FC	0–0	Sacramento Republic FC	Chandler, AZ
6:30 PM PDT	Njie (yellow card) 40'; Lambert (yellow card) 54'; Musa (yellow card) 55'; Moar (yellow card) 77'	Report	Cuello (yellow card) 35'; Ross (yellow card) 85'	Stadium: Wild Horse Pass Stadium; Referee: Brandon Stevis

July 30 20	Charleston Battery	2–4	Sacramento Republic FC	Mount Pleasant, SC
6:30 PM PDT	Kwakwa 4'; Williams 42'; Paterson (yellow card) 45+2'	Report	Cuello 16'; Archimède 30'; Lewis 44'; LaGrassa 48'; Desmond (yellow card) 68'; Sousa (yellow card) 78'	Stadium: Patriots Point Soccer Complex; Attendance: 2,929; Referee: Abdou Ndiaye

August 3 21	New Mexico United	1–2	Sacramento Republic FC	Albuquerque, NM
6:00 PM PDT	Preston (yellow card) 12', (goal) 54'; Moreno (yellow card) 90+3'	Report	Keko (yellow card) 3', (goal) 57'; Viader (yellow card) 34'; Martínez 61'; Ross (yellow card) 90+2'	Stadium: Isotopes Park; Attendance: 9,318; Referee: Matthew Corrigan

August 6 22	Sacramento Republic FC	1–1	Rio Grande Valley FC Toros	Sacramento, CA
8:00 PM CDT	Cuello (yellow card) 51'; Foster (yellow card) 61'; López (yellow card) 67', (goal) 90'; Martínez (yellow card) 79'; Keko (yellow card) 90+5'	Report	Pimentel (yellow card) 26'; Ricketts 53'; Nodarse (yellow card) 90+4'	Stadium: Heart Health Park; Attendance: 8,196; Referee: Malik Badawi

August 13 23	Monterey Bay FC	1–0	Sacramento Republic FC	Seaside, CA
7:00 PM PDT	Volesky 14', (yellow card) 79'; Fehr (yellow card) 21'; Murphy (yellow card) 89'; Robinson (yellow card) 90+2'	Report	Martínez (yellow card) 50'; Keko (yellow card) 65'; Casey (yellow card) 80'; Bauer (yellow card) 88'	Stadium: Cardinale Stadium; Attendance: 3,618; Referee: Ricardo Fierro

August 17 24	Sacramento Republic FC	3–0	Colorado Springs Switchbacks FC	Sacramento, CA
8:00 PM CDT	Foster 12'; Felipe (yellow card) 30'; LaGrassa 32'; Gurr (yellow card) 38'; Keko 45+1'; López (yellow card) 45+3', (penalty missed) 61'; Martínez (yellow card) 90+5'	Report	Halsey (yellow card) 46'; Echevarria (yellow card) 73'	Stadium: Heart Health Park; Attendance: 8,169; Referee: Luis Guardia

August 20 25	Las Vegas Lights FC	2–1	Sacramento Republic FC	Las Vegas, NV
7:30 PM	Romero (yellow card) 7'; Torres 22'; Crisostomo (yellow card) 35'; Iskenderian 45+2'; Keinan (yellow card) 64'	Report	Martínez 9' (pen.); Gurr (yellow card) 45'; Lacroix (yellow card) 90'	Stadium: Cashman Field; Referee: Elijio Arreguin

August 27 26	Sacramento Republic FC	1–0	Oakland Roots SC	Sacramento, CA
6:00 PM PDT	Donovan 21'; Keko (yellow card) 29'; Felipe (yellow card) 66'; Brown (yellow card) 84'	Report	Dennis (yellow card) 19'; Hernández (yellow card) 42'; Formella (yellow card) 43'; Johnsen (yellow card) 67'; Mfeka (yellow card) 72'	Stadium: Heart Health Park; Attendance: 10,916; Referee: Matthew Conger

September 3 27	Louisville City FC	3–1	Sacramento Republic FC	Louisville, KY
4:30 PM PDT	Harris 9'; Dia (yellow card) 24'; Totsch 45', (yellow card) 51'; Ownby (yellow card) 77'; Wynder 87'	Report	Jauregui (yellow card) 27'; Cuello 29'	Stadium: Lynn Family Stadium; Attendance: 9,292; Referee: Kevin Broadley

September 10 28	Sacramento Republic FC	4–0	Loudoun United FC	Sacramento, CA
22:00 EDT	Ross (yellow card) 35'; Brown 48'; Gurr 56' (yellow card) 90+5'; Casey 65'; Archimède 83'	Report	Zanne (yellow card) 30'; Freeman (yellow card) 63'; Downs (yellow card) 64'; Robinson (yellow card) 80'; Aboukoura (yellow card) 90+5'	Stadium: Heart Health Park; Attendance: 9,874; Referee: Alyssa Nichols

September 18 29	Sacramento Republic FC	4–0	Orange County SC	Sacramento, CA
6:00 PM PDT	Viader 7'; Foster (yellow card) 10', (goal) 28', 45'; López 18', (yellow card) 69'	Report	Hoffmann (yellow card) 31'; Orozco (red card) 35'; Partida (yellow card) 87'	Stadium: Heart Health Park; Attendance: 10,396; Referee: Sergii Demianchuk

September 24 30	San Antonio FC	1–0	Sacramento Republic FC	San Antonio, TX
5:30 PM PDT	Adeniran 17'; PC (yellow card) 27'; Maloney (yellow card) 33'; Gomez (yellow card) 45+4' (yellow-red card) 84'; Taintor (yellow card) 74'	Report	López (yellow card) 30'; Foster (yellow card) 50'; Ross (yellow card) 62'; Martínez (yellow card) 69'; Archimède (yellow card) 90+6'	Stadium: Toyota Field; Attendance: 6,205; Referee: Mathew Corrigan

September 28 31	Sacramento Republic FC	0–1	Phoenix Rising FC	Sacramento, CA
7:00 PM PDT	Viader (yellow card) 70'; Gurr (yellow card) 85'	Report	Rodríguez 35'; Torres (yellow card) 43'; Hurst (yellow card) 54'; Farrell (yellow card) 77'	Stadium: Heart Health Park; Attendance: 9,110; Referee: Matthew Conger

October 2 32	LA Galaxy II	2–0	Sacramento Republic FC	Carson, CA
5:00 PM PDT	Judd 7'; Saldana (yellow card) 20'; Salazar (red card) 37'; Lambe (yellow card) 41'; Bauer 61' (o.g.)	Report	Foster (yellow card) 73'; Lacroix (yellow card) 82'; Martínez (yellow card) 87'; Bauer (yellow card) 90+2'	Stadium: Dignity Health Sports Park; Referee: Brad Jensen

October 9 33	Sacramento Republic FC	1–1	Pittsburgh Riverhounds SC	Sacramento, CA
6:00 PM PDT	LaGrassa (yellow card) 50'; López (penalty scored) 54'	Report	Williams (yellow card) 34'; Forbes 57'; Osuna (yellow card) 74' (yellow-red card) 90+1'	Stadium: Heart Health Park; Attendance: 11,569; Referee: Mark Allatin

October 15 34	Sacramento Republic FC	4–0	San Diego Loyal SC	Sacramento, CA
6:00 PM PDT	López 2'; Keko 4'; LaGrassa 15', (yellow card) 31'; Archimède 81'; Felipe (yellow card) 86'	Report	Conway (yellow card) 45'; Carleton (yellow card) 67'; Riley (yellow card) 80'; Kasanzu (yellow card) 72'	Stadium: Heart Health Park; Attendance: 11,569; Referee: John Griggs

==== USL Championship playoffs ====
===== Results =====
October 22 WC Quarterfinal	Sacramento Republic FC	2–0	New Mexico United	Sacramento, CA
7:00 PM PDT	López (yellow card) 27'; Foster 47'; Keko 74'	Report	Yearwood (yellow card) 16'; Moreno (yellow card) 42'	Stadium: Heart Health Park; Attendance: 11,569; Referee: Elvis Osmanovic

October 29 WC Semifinal	Colorado Springs Switchbacks FC	2–1 (a.e.t.)	Sacramento Republic FC	Colorado Springs, CO
5:00 PM PDT	Ngalina 37', 96'; Amoh (penalty missed) 68'; Wheeler (yellow card) 106'; Caldwell (yellow card) 114'; Anderson (yellow card) 120+2'	Report	Lopez 18'; LaGrassa (yellow card) 39'; Gurr (yellow card) 45+2'; Casey (yellow card) 65'; Martínez (yellow card) 66'; Archimède (yellow card) 120+2'	Stadium: Weidner Field; Attendance: 7,075; Referee: Sergii Demianchuk

=== U.S. Open Cup ===
April 7 Second round	Sacramento Republic (USLC) (California)	6–0	(Oregon) Portland Timbers U23s (USL2)	Sacramento, CA
7:30 pm PDT	Lacroix 13', 35'; Viader 22'; LaGrassa 26'; López 30'; Lewis 41'	Report		Stadium: Heart Health Park; Attendance: 2,260; Referee: Michael Zapata

April 20 Third round	Sacramento Republic (USLC) (California)	2–1	(California) Central Valley Fuego (USL1)	Sacramento, CA
7:30 pm PDT	Casey 44'; López 90+5' (pen.)	Report	Bustamante 76'	Stadium: Heart Health Park; Attendance: 3,712; Referee: Elijio Arreguin

May 11 Fourth round	Sacramento Republic (USLC) (California)	2–0	(Arizona) Phoenix Rising (USLC)	Sacramento, CA
7:30 pm PDT	Luis Felipe 30'; Martínez 88'	Report		Stadium: Heart Health Park; Attendance: 3,273; Referee: Joseph Salinas

May 25 Fifth round	Sacramento Republic (USLC) (California)	2–0	(California) San Jose Earthquakes (MLS)	Sacramento, CA
7:30 pm PDT	Luis Felipe 28'; López 83'	Report		Stadium: Heart Health Park; Attendance: 11,569; Referee: Elijio Arreguin

June 21 Quarterfinals	LA Galaxy (MLS) (California)	1–2	(California) Sacramento Republic FC (USLC)	Carson, CA
7:30 pm PDT	Donovan 18' (o.g.)	Report	López 4'; Luis Felipe 70'	Stadium: Dignity Health Sports Park; Attendance: 12,315; Referee: Malik Badawi

July 27 Semifinals	Sacramento Republic (USLC) (California)	0–0 (a.e.t.) (5–4 p)	Sporting Kansas City (MLS)	Sacramento, CA
7:30 pm PDT	Luis Felipe (yellow card) 58'; Ross (yellow card) 90+4'	Report	Sweat (yellow card) 37'; Hernández (yellow card) 127'	Stadium: Heart Health Park; Attendance: 11,569; Referee: Allen Chapman
	Penalties
	Viader (penalty scored); Fernandes (penalty scored); Archimède (penalty scored); Foster (penalty scored); López (penalty scored)		(penalty scored) Russell; (penalty scored) Sallói; (penalty scored) Agada; (penalty scored) Hernández; (penalty missed) Zusi

September 7 Final	Orlando City SC (MLS) (Florida)	3–0	(California) Sacramento Republic (USLC)	Orlando, FL
8:00 pm EDT	Antônio Carlos (yellow card) 69'; Torres 75', 80' (pen.); Pereyra (yellow card) 90+1'; Michel 90+6'	Report	Desmond (yellow card) 74'; Luis Felipe (yellow card) 77'; López (yellow card) 79'	Stadium: Exploria Stadium; Attendance: 25,527; Referee: Ramy Touchan
