= Lee Desmond =

Irish footballer (born 1995)

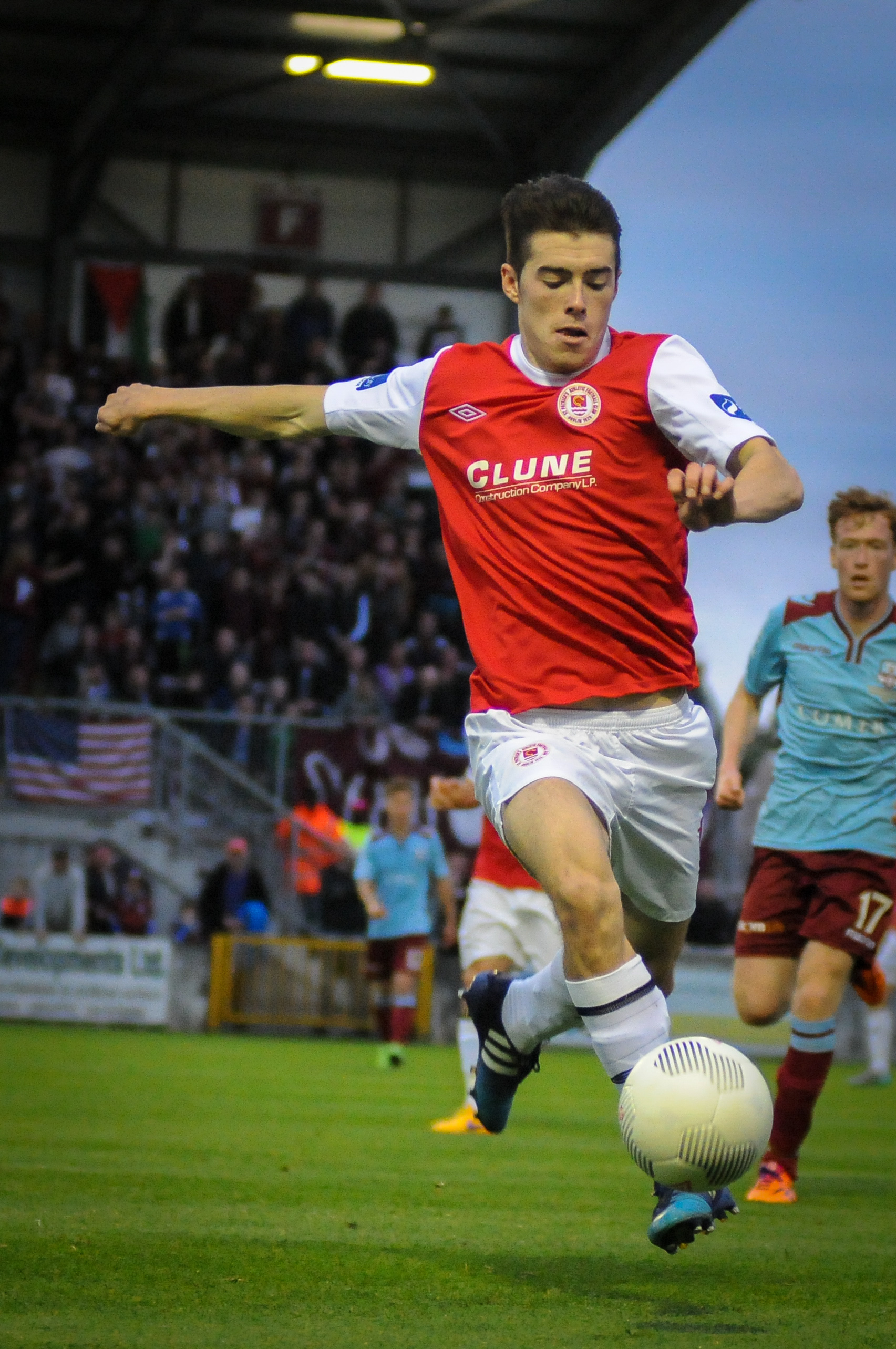
- Lee Desmond in 2015

Personal information
- Full name: Lee Desmond
- Date of birth: 22 January 1995 (age 31)
- Place of birth: Donaghmede, Dublin, Ireland
- Height: 1.83 m (6 ft 0 in)
- Positions: Centre back; centre midfielder

Team information
- Current team: Sacramento Republic
- Number: 4

Youth career
- Malahide United
- Cherry Orchard
- 2011–2013: Newcastle United
- 2013: Shelbourne

Senior career*
Years	Team	Apps	(Gls)
2014	Shelbourne	24	(1)
2015–2021	St Patrick's Athletic	188	(2)
2022–	Sacramento Republic	128	(3)

International career
2014	Republic of Ireland U19	1	(0)
2015	Republic of Ireland U21	3	(0)
- * Club domestic league appearances and goals as of 09:09, 17 November 2026 (UTC)

Lee Desmond (born 22 January 1995) is an Irish professional footballer who plays as a centre back or centre midfielder for USL Championship club Sacramento Republic.

== Career ==
=== Early career ===
Desmond played youth football with Malahide United, Crumlin United and Cherry Orchard before being picked up by English Premier League side Newcastle United, where he played in their youth and reserve teams. He was released by Newcastle at the end of their 2012–2013 season despite playing regularly for their development squad. Desmond joined Shelbourne in July 2013 after playing against them in a friendly while on trial with Ipswich Town and impressed Shels manager Johnny McDonnell enough for him to offer the youngster the chance to join the club. He played for the Shelbourne under 19 team for the 2013–2014 season before signing for the Shels first team in November 2013.

=== Shelbourne ===
After standing out for the club's under 19 side, he was called up to the first team for the 2014 season as they aimed to win promotion to the League of Ireland Premier Division. Desmond became a mainstay in the first team, playing at both left-back and centre-back throughout the season. He scored his first goal in senior football on 23 May 2014 in a 1–1 draw away to Finn Harps. The season ended in disappointment however as Shels failed to earn promotion as they lost out to Galway in the Semi-final of the Promotion Playoffs, although Desmond did win the Shelbourne Players' Player of the Year award after a very impressive first season in senior football.

=== St Patrick's Athletic ===
Desmond's impressive season with Shelbourne attracted interest from Shels' Dublin rivals and FAI Cup holders, St Patrick's Athletic from the League of Ireland Premier Division. He was announced to have signed for the Saints on 11 November 2014, alongside Jason McGuinness and Ciarán Kilduff. Desmond featured throughout the season for Pats, mainly at centre-back but also at left or right back in the absence of Ian Bermingham or Ger O'Brien. He started in many important games including playing in both legs of their UEFA Europa League games against Skonto Riga of Latvia. On 19 September 2015 he started at left back in the 2015 League of Ireland Cup Final against Galway United and won his first winners medal at senior level, as the Saints won on penalties after a 0–0 draw. At the club's end of season awards he was voted as Young Player of the Year by the St Pat's supporters following a brilliant debut season.

Desmond's second season at Pat's proved to be a more difficult one for him, as he lost his place in the centre of defence following some errors resulting in goals for the opposition. Midway through the season, he was deployed by Liam Buckley as a defensive midfielder following poor performances by various regular choice midfielders and Desmond impressed supporters in games this role including a 4–1 win over Limerick in the 2016 League Cup Final to help the Saints retain the trophy.

The 2017 season saw Pat's involved in a relegation battle, with the team bottom of the table and struggling mid-season. Having played many games as a holding midfielder in the first half of the season, Desmond was returned to centre back and formed an excellent defensive partnership with mid-season signing Jordi Balk. The team's form also picked up in the second half of the season as they managed to finish in 8th position with Desmond contributing heavily, playing in all but one of the club's 33 league games.

The 2018 season saw Desmond voted Player of the Year by the club's supporters.

Desmond made his 200th appearance for the club on 23 April 2021 in a 2–0 win over Finn Harps at Finn Park. On 28 November 2021 Desmond was named Man of the Match in the 2021 FAI Cup Final for his performance over 120 minutes as his side defeated rivals Bohemians 4–3 on penalties following a 1–1 draw after extra time in front of a record FAI Cup Final crowd of 37,126 at the Aviva Stadium. This would prove to be his last game for the club as he departed at the end of the season.

=== Sacramento Republic ===
On 23 December 2021, Desmond signed for USL Championship club Sacramento Republic on a two-year deal. Desmond made his debut for the club on 13 March 2022 in a 3–1 win over El Paso Locomotive at Heart Health Park. Desmond featured in every round of the club's run to the final of the U.S. Open Cup, including wins over Major League Soccer sides San Jose Earthquakes, Sporting Kansas City and LA Galaxy. On 7 September 2022, Desmond played in the 2022 U.S. Open Cup Final as his side were defeated 3–0 by Orlando City in front of a sold-out crowd of 25,527 at the Exploria Stadium in Florida. In September 2022, Desmond successfully underwent a procedure on his right leg to address lingering retrocalcaneal bursitis and achilles tendinitis, with the procedure ruling him out for the remainder of the season. On 26 August 2023, he captained his team in his 300th career appearance, in a 2–0 defeat at home to Orange County. On 25 September 2024, Desmond signed a new contract, extending his time with the club. On 2 August 2025, he scored his first goal for the club, on his 104th appearance in all competitions, when he opened the scoring in a 3–1 win away to San Antonio. On 4 October 2025, he played in the final of the 2025 USL Cup, in which his side were defeated 1–0 by Hartford Athletic. On 26 November 2025, it was announced that Desmond had signed a new contract, taking him into a fifth season with the club. On 21 November 2026, he was part of the team that defeated Lousville City in the 2026 USL Championship Playoff Final to win the title.

== International career ==
Desmond was called up to the Republic of Ireland under-21s shortly after he signed for St Patrick's Athletic alongside fellow centre back Sean Hoare. Desmond, along with fellow St Patrick's Athletic teammates Conor Kearns and Shane Griffin, was called up to train with the Republic of Ireland senior squad on 31 August 2020, in what was new manager Stephen Kenny's first training session with the squad.

== Career statistics ==
As of match played on 21 November 2026

Appearances and goals by club, season and competition
Club	Season	League			National Cup (Note: Includes FAI Cup & U.S. Open Cup)		League Cup (Note: Includes League of Ireland Cup & USL Cup)		Continental		Other		Total	
Club	Season	Division	Apps	Goals	Apps	Goals	Apps	Goals	Apps	Goals	Apps	Goals	Apps	Goals
Shelbourne	2014	LOI First Division	24	1	2	0	1	0	—		3 (Note: 2 appearances in the League of Ireland promotion/relegation playoffs & 1 appearance in the Leinster Senior Cup)	0	30	1
St Patrick's Athletic	2015	LOI Premier Division	24	0	2	0	3	0	2 (Note: Appearances in the UEFA Europa League)	0	4 (Note: 1 appearance in the President's Cup & 3 appearances in the Leinster Senior Cup)	0	35	0
St Patrick's Athletic	2016	LOI Premier Division	17	0	4	0	4	0	0	0	0 (Note: Appearances in the Leinster Senior Cup)	0	25	0
St Patrick's Athletic	2017	LOI Premier Division	32	0	2	0	3	0	—		0	0	37	0
St Patrick's Athletic	2018	LOI Premier Division	36	0	2	0	1	0	—		3	0	42	0
St Patrick's Athletic	2019	LOI Premier Division	31	1	2	0	1	0	2	0	0	0	36	1
St Patrick's Athletic	2020	LOI Premier Division	18	0	0	0	—		—		—		18	0
St Patrick's Athletic	2021	LOI Premier Division	30	1	3	0	—		—		—		33	1
St Patrick's Athletic	Total		188	2	15	0	12	0	4	0	7	0	226	2
Sacramento Republic	2022	USL Championship	21	0	7	0	—		—		0 (Note: Appearances in the 2022 USL Championship Playoffs)	0	28	0
Sacramento Republic	2023	USL Championship	22	0	1	0	—		—		3 (Note: Appearances in the 2023 USL Championship Playoffs)	0	26	0
Sacramento Republic	2024	USL Championship	31	0	3	0	—		—		1 (Note: Appearance in the 2024 USL Championship playoffs)	0	35	0
Sacramento Republic	2025	USL Championship	24	1	0	0	7	0	—		1 (Note: Appearance in the 2025 USL Championship playoffs)	0	32	1
Sacramento Republic	2026	USL Championship	30	2	3	1	4	0	—		4 (Note: Appearances in the 2026 USL Championship playoffs)	0	41	3
Sacramento Republic	Total		128	3	14	1	11	0	—		9	0	162	4
Career total			340	6	31	1	24	0	4	0	19	0	418	7
