= Kieran Phillips (footballer, born 2000) =

English footballer (born 2000)

Kieran James Philips
Personal information
- Full name: Kieran James Phillips
- Date of birth: 18 February 2000 (age 26)
- Place of birth: Pontefract, England
- Height: 6 ft 2 in (1.87 m)
- Position: Forward

Team information
- Current team: Ross County
- Number: 11

Youth career
- Huddersfield Town
- 2013–2020: Everton
- 2020: Huddersfield Town

Senior career*
Years	Team	Apps	(Gls)
2020–2025	Huddersfield Town	10	(0)
2021–2022	→ Walsall (loan)	26	(4)
2022	→ Exeter City (loan)	11	(2)
2022–2023	→ Morecambe (loan)	20	(7)
2023–2024	→ Shrewsbury Town (loan)	8	(0)
2024	→ Sacramento Republic (loan)	28	(12)
2025–	Ross County	67	(12)
- * Club domestic league appearances and goals as of 6 September 2026

Kieran James Phillips (born 18 February 2000) is an English professional footballer who plays as a forward for Scottish League One club Ross County.

== Career ==
=== Huddersfield Town ===
Born in Pontefract, Phillips started his football career playing for his local club, Huddersfield Town, before moving to Everton's academy at under-13 level. In 2016, he suffered a double knee fracture, which ruled him out for two and a half years.

Phillips returned to Huddersfield Town in January 2020, originally on a loan deal until the end of the 2019–20 season. The deal was made permanent on 13 July 2020, with Phillips signing until the summer of 2021, with the option of a further year's extension. On 10 September, Phillips signed a new contract with the club, running end of the 2021–22 season – again with the option of an additional year.

Phillips made his professional début for Huddersfield on 2 January 2021, when he came on as a substitute in their 2–1 Championship defeat to Reading, replacing Rarmani Edmonds-Green. He made his first senior start for the club in a 3–2 FA Cup Third Round defeat at home to Plymouth Argyle.

On 12 July 2021, Phillips joined League Two side Walsall on a season-long loan deal. He signed a new contract with Huddersfield, running until 2025, on 20 January 2022. Phillips was recalled by Huddersfield on 28 January, after scoring five goals in thirty-three appearances across all competitions.

Three days later, Phillips joined League Two club Exeter City on loan, until the end of the 2021–22 season. The move was due to him playing as a winger at Walsall, but Huddersfield seeing his long-term future as a striker – which Exeter were able to cater for. He gained automatic promotion with Exeter this season.

At the start of the 2022–23 season, Phillips joined Morecambe on loan for the season, but his loan was curtailed on 16 January 2023, owing to a long-term injury.

On 24 August 2023, Phillips joined League One side Shrewsbury Town on a season-long loan. He was recalled from his loan spell on 31 January 2024 to continue rehabilitation on an injury which had ruled him out since October.

On 12 April 2024, Phillips joined Huddersfield's sister USL Championship club Sacramento Republic on loan for the remainder of the 2024 season.

=== Ross County ===
On 6 January 2025, Phillips signed for Scottish Premiership club Ross County on a two-and-a-half year deal for an undisclosed fee.

== Career statistics ==
As of 31 October 2026

Appearances and goals by club, season and competition
Club	Season	League			National Cup		League Cup		Other		Total	
Club	Season	Division	Apps	Goals	Apps	Goals	Apps	Goals	Apps	Goals	Apps	Goals
Huddersfield Town	2020–21	Championship	10	0	1	0	0	0	—		11	0
Huddersfield Town	2021–22	Championship	0	0	0	0	0	0	—		0	0
Huddersfield Town	2022–23	Championship	0	0	0	0	0	0	—		0	0
Huddersfield Town	2023–24	Championship	0	0	0	0	0	0	—		0	0
Huddersfield Town	2024–25	Championship	0	0	0	0	0	0	—		0	0
Huddersfield Town	Total		10	0	1	0	0	0	0	0	11	0
Walsall (loan)	2021–22	League Two	26	4	2	0	1	0	4 (Note: Appearance(s) in EFL Trophy)	1	33	5
Exeter City (loan)	2021–22	League Two	11	2	0	0	0	0	0	0	11	2
Morecambe (loan)	2022–23	League One	20	7	1	0	1	0	3	0	25	7
Shrewsbury Town (loan)	2023–24	League One	8	0	0	0	0	0	2	0	10	0
Sacramento Republic (loan)	2024	USL Championship	28	12	3	3	—		0	0	31	15
Ross County	2024–25	Scottish Premiership	16	2	1	0	0	0	1 (Note: Appearances in Scottish Premiership play-offs)	0	18	2
Ross County	2025–26	Scottish Championship	28	5	2	0	4	1	1 (Note: Appearances in the Scottish Challenge Cup)	0	35	6
Ross County	2026–27	Scottish League One	12	5	0	0	5	0	6	9	23	14
Ross County	Total		67	12	3	0	8	1	4	2	76	22
Career total			170	37	10	3	10	1	13	3	197	59
