= Da'vian Kimbrough =

American soccer player (born 2010)

Personal information
- Full name: Da'vian Jaleel Kimbrough
- Date of birth: February 18, 2010 (age 16)
- Place of birth: Woodland, California, United States
- Height: 5 ft 11 in (1.80 m)
- Position: Forward

Team information
- Current team: North Texas SC (on loan from Sacramento Republic FC)
- Number: 30

Youth career
- North Bay Elite FC
- Woodland SC
- 2021–2023: Sacramento Republic

Senior career*
Years	Team	Apps	(Gls)
2023–	Sacramento Republic	6	(0)
2026–	→ North Texas SC (loan)	7	(1)

International career^{‡}
2023–2025	Mexico U15	12	(10)
2024–2026	Mexico U16	8	(3)
2025–2026	United States U16	5	(2)
- * Club domestic league appearances and goals as of October 31, 2026 ‡ National team caps and goals as of May 18, 2026

Da'vian Jaleel Kimbrough (born February 18, 2010) is a Mexican-American professional soccer player who plays as a forward for MLS NEXT Pro club North Texas SC, on loan from USL Championship club Sacramento Republic FC. He has represented both Mexico and the United States at youth level.

He became the youngest professional player in United States history at the age of 13 years, 7 months, and 13 days, when he made a first-team appearance in October 2023.

== Early life ==
Kimbrough was born in Woodland, California to an African-American father and Mexican mother. He began playing youth soccer with North Bay Elite FC and Woodland SC. In 2021, he joined the Sacramento Republic FC academy. In June 2023, he was a guest player with the New York Red Bulls Academy at the Bassevelde U13 Cup, helping them become the first MLS academy to win the tournament and was named tournament MVP.

== Club career ==
On August 8, 2023, he signed a professional contract with Sacramento Republic FC of the USL Championship, at the age of 13 years, 5 months, and 13 days, becoming the youngest professional athlete in US sports history. On October 1, 2023, Kimbrough made his professional debut, coming on as a substitute against the Las Vegas Lights, becoming the youngest player to appear in an American team sport at the age of 13 years, seven months, and 13 days.

On June 5, 2026, Sacramento Republic announced they had loaned Kimbrough to MLS Next Pro club North Texas SC.

== International career ==
Kimbrough was born in the United States and is of Mexican descent, holding dual-citizenship. In October 2022, he was invited to a United States identification camp for 2008 and 2009 born players (despite being a 2010). He was called up to a training camp with the Mexico U16 team in September 2023.

== Career statistics ==
As of July 21, 2024

Club	Season	League			Playoffs		National cup		Continental		Total	
Club	Season	Division	Apps	Goals	Apps	Goals	Apps	Goals	Apps	Goals	Apps	Goals
Sacramento Republic	2023	USL Championship	1	0	0	0	0	0	–		1	0
Sacramento Republic	2024	USL Championship	3	0	0	0	0	0	–		3	0
Career total			4	0	0	0	0	0	0	0	4	0
