= Mauricio González =

Mauricio González is the name of:

- Mauricio González (footballer) (1942–2018), Salvadoran football player
- Mauricio González (runner) (born 1960), Mexican long-distance runner
- Mauricio González de la Garza (1923–1995), Mexican journalist, writer and music composer
- Mauricio González Sfeir (born 1956), Bolivian businessman
- Mauricio González (born 1999), Kentucky, US Navy
