= Damià Viader =

Spanish footballer

Personal information
- Full name: Damià Viader Masdeu
- Date of birth: 19 February 1998 (age 28)
- Place of birth: Barcelona, Spain
- Height: 1.75 m (5 ft 9 in)
- Positions: Defender; midfielder

Team information
- Current team: Forward Madison
- Number: 3

Youth career
- 2006–2011: Barcelona
- 2014–2016: Girona

College career
Years	Team	Apps	(Gls)
2018–2019	Barton Cougars	24	(2)
2019–2020	Iowa Western Reivers	18	(9)

Senior career*
Years	Team	Apps	(Gls)
2017–2018	CE Europa		
2019	Duluth FC	11	(1)
2020–2021	Union Omaha	41	(7)
2022–2024	Sacramento Republic	76	(5)
2025–	Forward Madison FC	28	(0)
- * Club domestic league appearances and goals as of October 31, 2025

Damià Viader Masdeu (born 19 February 1998) is a Spanish footballer who plays as a midfielder and defender for Forward Madison FC in USL League One.

== Career ==
=== Union Omaha ===
After joining the club prior to the 2020 season, Viader made his debut on 25 July 2020 against New England Revolution II. He was named USL League One Defender of the Year at the conclusion of his sophomore season with Union Omaha, in which the club held the league's best record and won the playoff final. Viader registered six goals and five assists, and finished third in the league in both interceptions and recoveries.

=== Sacramento Republic ===
On 2 March 2022, Viader signed with USL Championship side Sacramento Republic. He played three seasons with Sacramento.

=== Forward Madison ===
On 1 April 2025, Forward Madison FC announced that it had signed Viader for the remainder of the 2025 season.
