= Rafael Jauregui =

American soccer player (born 2004)

Personal information
- Date of birth: December 20, 2004 (age 21)
- Place of birth: Rancho Cordova, California, U.S.
- Position: Midfielder

Team information
- Current team: Tacoma Defiance
- Number: 42

Youth career
- 2017–2020: Sacramento Republic

Senior career*
| Years | Team | Apps | (Gls) |
| 2020–2024 | Sacramento Republic | 50 | (1) |
| 2025 | Charlotte Independence | 29 | (1) |
| 2026– | Tacoma Defiance | 0 | (0) |

International career
| 2019 | United States U15 | 5 | (2) |
- * Club domestic league appearances and goals as of October 31, 2025

Rafael Jauregui (born December 20, 2004) is an American soccer player who plays as a midfielder for Tacoma Defiance in MLS Next Pro.

== Career ==
=== Sacramento Republic ===
In July 2020, Jauregui signed a USL Academy contract with the club. He made his league debut for the club on July 20, 2020, coming on as an 89th-minute substitute for Dariusz Formella in a 1–0 home victory over Reno 1868.

=== Charlotte Independence ===
Jauregui joined USL League One club Charlotte Independence in February 2025.

== Personal life ==
Born in the United States, Jauregui is of Mexican descent.
