= Nick Ross (footballer, born 1991) =

Scottish footballer (born 1991)

Personal information
- Date of birth: 11 November 1991 (age 35)
- Place of birth: Inverness, Scotland
- Position: Midfielder

Team information
- Current team: Monterey Bay FC
- Number: 4

Youth career
- 2008–2010: Inverness Caledonian Thistle

Senior career*
Years	Team	Apps	(Gls)
2010–2015	Inverness Caledonian Thistle	149	(11)
2015–2017	Dundee	56	(1)
2018	Sepsi OSK	5	(0)
2018	Brora Rangers	3	(1)
2019–2021	El Paso Locomotive	69	(6)
2022–2025	Sacramento Republic	112	(7)
2026–	Monterey Bay	28	(0)

International career
2010	Scotland U21	1	(1)
- * Club domestic league appearances and goals as of 18:46, 9 November 2026 (UTC)

Nicholas Ross (born 11 November 1991) is a Scottish professional footballer who plays as an attacking midfielder for Monterey Bay FC in the USL Championship. Ross has previously played for Inverness Caledonian Thistle, Dundee, Brora Rangers, El Paso Locomotive, Sacramento Republic and the Scotland under-21 team.

== Club career ==
=== Inverness Caledonian Thistle ===
Born in Inverness, Scotland, Ross came through the youth ranks at Inverness Caledonian Thistle. Following the club’s relegation, he signed his first professional contract with them.

Ahead of the 2009–10 season, Ross was among several youngsters selected for the first team squad by manager Terry Butcher. Ross made his debut for Inverness Caledonian Thistle against Montrose in the first round of the Challenge Cup and played 120 minutes in a 1–1 draw, leading to penalties and the club went on to win 5–3 in the shootout. On 15 August 2009, he made his league debut for Inverness Caledonian Thistle, in a 0–0 draw against Ayr United. Following this, Ross received a handful of first team football in a number of matches under Butcher. On 13 March 2010, he scored his first goal for the club, in a 1–0 win against Greenock Morton. Partly as a result of scoring his first goal, Ross's anticipated move to a club on loan was deferred. In a follow–up match against Clachnacuddin in the Inverness Cup final, he scored in a 2–0 win to help Inverness Caledonian Thistle win the tournament. Ross was part of the club’s squad in achieving promotion back to the Scottish Premier League. At the end of the 2009–10 season, he made six appearances and scoring once in all competitions.

At the start of the 2010–11 season, Ross started more games for Inverness Caledonian Thistle, putting in some good performances and becoming a first team regular. His performance led to the club offered him a new contract in early–December. On 5 December 2010, he signed a new contract with Inverness Caledonian Thistle, keeping him until 2013. However, in mid–February, Ross suffered a foot injury and was out for two matches. On 26 February 2011, he made his return from injury, coming on as a 56th-minute substitute, in a 2–0 loss against Hibernian. However, his return was short–lived when Ross suffered an illness that saw him out for one match. On 9 April 2011, he returned to the starting line–up, in a 1–1 draw against Kilmarnock. On 4 May 2011, Ross played a role in a match against Celtic when he set up a goal for Shane Sutherland, who scored a winning goal, in a 3–2 win. A week later on 11 May 2011, Ross scored from a 20-yard volley in a match against Hibernian. At the end of the 2010–11 season, he made thirty–nine appearances and scoring once in all competitions.

In the 2011–12 season, Ross continued to be involved in the first team despite being placed on the substitute bench. On 16 September 2011, he scored his first goal of the season, in a 3–1 loss against Dundee United. However, the following month saw Ross suffered a groin injury and was out for a month. On 26 November 2011, he made his return from injury, coming on as a 83rd-minute substitute, in a 2–1 loss against Hearts. On 18 February 2012, Ross scored his second goal of the season, in a 1–1 draw against Dunfermline Athletic. At the end of the 2011–12 season, he made thirty–two appearances and scoring two times in all competitions.

Ahead of the 2012–13 season, Ross said his aim was to score more goals for Inverness Caledonian Thistle. He scored in the opening game of the season, in a 1–1 draw against St Mirren. However, in a match against Celtic on 25 August 2012, Ross dislocated his shoulder and was substituted in the 66th minute, as the club loss 4–2. After the match, he eventually had to undergo an operation. However, manager Butcher announced that Ross would be out for three months, describing his injury as a "massive blow". In December 2012, he signed a new two-year contract with Inverness Caledonian Thistle. On 29 December 2012, Ross made his return from injury, coming on as a late substitute for Billy McKay, in a 0–0 draw against St Johnstone. Following his return from injury, he stated on working hard to improve his strength and fitness. Following his return from injury, he was involved in the first team throughout the second half of the season. Ross scored on 9 February 2013 and 13 February 2013 against Celtic and Kilmarnock respectively. In April, Ross 'called' for the club to push on, and seal a UEFA Europa League place for the first time ever, but ultimately, they narrowly missed out on that target after losing 1–0 against local rivals, Ross County. At the end of the 2012–13 season, he made twenty–two appearances and scoring three times in all competitions.

Ross started his 2013–14 season with an 'assist' for Aaron Doran, in a 2–2 draw against Celtic on 24 August 2013. Manager Butcher said that Ross is an important member of the team. Since the start of the 2013–14 season, he quickly regained his first team place, playing in the left–wing position. Following the departure of Terry Butcher, Ross scored his first goal of the season from a penalty, in a 2–0 win over Hibernian on 9 November 2013. On 30 November 2013, he scored his second goal of the season, in a 4–0 win over Greenock Morton in the fourth round of Scottish Cup. In the semi-final of Scottish League Cup against Heart of Midlothian, Ross came on as a substitute in the last few minutes and scored a dramatic equaliser, sending the match into extra-time and then converted the fourth penalty in the subsequent penalty shoot-out, helping Inverness Caledonian Thistle to win and reach the final. On 18 February 2014, he scored his fourth goal of the season, in a 2–0 win over Stranraer to send the club through to the next round of the Scottish Cup. In the Scottish League Cup final against Aberdeen, Ross came on as a substitute for Marley Watkins in the 80th minute, and played all the way to extra-time, leading to penalty shootout, where he converted the fourth penalty in the shoot-out, as Inverness Caledonian Thistle lost 4–2 on penalties. However, Ross was predominantly used as a substitute by new manager John Hughes in the second half of the season. At the end of the 2013–14 season, he made thirty–nine appearances and scoring four times in all competitions.

Ahead of the 2014–15 season, Ross stated his desire to sign a new contract with Inverness Caledonian Thistle and fight to regain his place in the team. He continued to be mainly used as a substitute throughout the 2014–15 season. On 10 January 2015, Ross played a role against Kilmarnock when he set up two goals, in a 2–1 win. On 24 January 2015, Ross scored his first goal of the season, in a 2–0 win against Hamilton Academical. On 21 February 2015, he scored his second goal of the season, in a 3–3 draw against Kilmarnock. During the same month, Ross began talks with the club over a new contract. He came on as a 74th-minute substitute against Celtic in the Scottish Cup semi-final and played all the way to extra time to help Inverness Caledonian Thistle win 3–2 to reach the final. On 16 May 2015, Ross scored his third goal of the season, in a 3–0 win against Dundee United. In the Scottish Cup Final, he came on as a late substitute for Marley Watkins during time added on at the end of the match, as the club beat Falkirk a 2–1 to win their first ever Scottish Cup Final. At the end of the 2014–15 season, Ross made thirty–two appearances and scoring three times in all competitions. Following this, he left Inverness Caledonian Thistle under freedom of contract.

=== Dundee ===
Ross signed a two-year contract with Dundee on 24 June 2015. Upon joining the club, he felt lack of first team opportunities at Inverness Caledonian Thistle was a factor of leaving.

Ross made his Dundee debut, starting the whole game, in a 4–0 loss against Kilmarnock in the opening game of the season. Since joining the club, he became a first team regular, playing in the midfield position. Ross scored his first goal for the club in a 2–1 victory against rivals Dundee United on 2 January 2016. At the end of the 2015–16 season, he made forty–two appearances and scoring two times in all competitions.

However, in the 2016–17 season, Ross suffered a knee injury and played the whole game, as Dundee beat Dumbarton 6–2 in the Scottish League Cup. After missing two matches, he returned to the first team, coming on as an 81st-minute substitute, in a 3–1 win against Ross County in the opening game of the season. Since returning from injury, Ross found his first team opportunities, due to the competitions in the Dundee’s midfield positions. He also faced his own injury concern along the way. As a result, Ross received more playing time at Dundee’s reserve team. At the end of the 2016–17 season, he made twenty–one appearances in all competitions. Following this, Ross left the club at the end of his contract.

=== Sepsi OSK ===
After leaving Dundee, Ross trained with Inverness Caledonian Thistle to maintain his fitness. He played as a trialist in a charity game against local rivals, Ross County, on 8 November 2017. On 6 February 2018, Ross signed a short-term contract with Romanian club Sepsi OSK.

He made his debut for the club, coming on as a 70th-minute substitute, in a 2–0 loss against FCSB on 25 February 2018. At the end of the 2017–18 season, Ross made five appearances for Sepsi OSK in all competitions. Following this, he was released by the club.

=== Brora Rangers ===
After a somewhat unsuccessful time in Romania, Ross returned to the Highlands with Highland League side, Brora Rangers on 16 October 2018 with the hope of securing a full-time contract in the coming weeks. He made five appearances and scoring once in all competitions.

=== El Paso Locomotive ===
After a brief stint with Brora Rangers, Ross signed for American side El Paso Locomotive on a one-year deal with the option of a further year. Upon joining the club, he revealed that his former teammates at Inverness Caledonian Thistle and coach Mark Lowry influenced his decision to join the club.

Ross made his debut for El Paso Locomotive, starting a match and played 79 minutes before being substituted, in a 3–1 loss against OKC Energy FC in the opening game of the season. Two weeks later on 23 March 2019, he scored his first goal for the club and set up of one of the goals, in a 2–2 draw against Rio Grande Valley FC Toros. For his performance, Ross was named USL Championship Team of the Week. Since joining El Paso Locomotive, he became a first team regular, playing in the midfield position. On 15 October 2019, Ross scored his second goal of the season, and set up the club’s opening goal of the game, in a 4–1 win against Portland Timbers 2. At the end of the 2019 season, he made thirty–three appearances and scoring two times in all competitions. Following this, Ross signed a new contract with El Paso Locomotive.

At the start of the 2020 season, Ross played once for El Paso Locomotive before the season was suspended because of the COVID-19 pandemic. He remained an integral part of the team once the season resumed behind closed doors. On 16 August 2020, Ross scored his first goal of the season, in a 1–0 win against Real Monarchs. However, he suffered an injury that kept him out for two months. On 3 October 2020, Ross made his return from injury, coming on as an 80th-minute substitute, in a 4–0 win against Real Monarchs. At the end of the 2020 season, he made eleven appearances and scoring in all competitions. Following this, Ross signed a contract extension with the club.

In the 2021 season, Ross regained his first team place, playing in the midfield position. On 9 June 2021, he scored his first goal of the season, in a 2–0 win against Indy Eleven. On 3 September 2021, Ross scored his second goal of the season, in a 2–2 draw against Orange County. On 6 October 2021, he scored his third goal of the season, in a 3–3 draw against San Antonio FC. At the end of the 2021 season, Ross made thirty–three appearances and scoring three times in all competitions. Following this, he was nominated for USL Championship’s Most Valuable Player Award. On 18 December 2021, he and El Paso Locomotive mutually agreed to part ways.

=== Sacramento Republic ===
On 5 January 2022, Ross signed with USL Championship club Sacramento Republic. He revealed that El Paso Locomotive offered him a two–year contract but opted to join Sacramento Republic instead.

Ross made his debut for the club against his former club, El Paso Locomotive in the opening game of the season and started the whole game, in a 3–1 win. He contributed Sacramento Republic’s impressive form at the start of the season. However, he soon was plagued by injuries along the way. Ross helped Sacramento Republic reach the U.S. Open Cup final after beating Sporting Kansas City on penalties following a 0–0 draw in the semi–finals of the U.S. Open Cup. In the U.S. Open Cup final against Orlando City, he came on as a late substitute, as the club loss 3–0. Despite this, Ross continued to be involved in the first team for the rest of the season. At the end of the 2022 season, he made twenty–eight appearances in all competitions. Following this, Ross signed a contract extension with Sacramento Republic.

At the start of the 2023 season, Ross found his playing time, coming from the substitute bench. On 27 April 2023, he scored his Sacramento Republic goal, in a 1–0 win against Oakland Roots. On 3 June 2023, Ross scored his second goal of the season, in a 1–1 draw against Tampa Bay Rowdies. On 1 July 2023, he scored his third goal of the season, in a 1–1 draw against Rio Grande Valley FC Toros. After not playing for a month due to injury, Ross returned to the first team, coming on as a 75th-minute substitute, in a 2–1 loss against Phoenix Rising on 30 August 2023. Following his return, he later regained his first team place towards the end of the season. On 27 October 2023, Ross scored his fourth goal of the season, in a 3–1 win against San Antonio FC in the USL Championship playoffs’ Conference Semifinals. However, he was unable to help the club reach the final after losing the USL Championship playoffs Conference Finals 2–1 against Phoenix Rising. At the end of the 2023 season, Ross made twenty–eight appearances and scoring four times in all competitions. Following this, he signed a contract extension with Sacramento Republic.

At the start of the 2024 season, Ross continued to regain his first team place, playing in the midfield position. He also began to assist goals in several league matches for Sacramento Republic. On 21 July 2024, Ross scored his first goal of the season and set up one of the goals, in a 5–2 win against Oakland Roots. After the match, he were among three players, representing the club, to be named USL Championship Team of the Week. On 10 August 2024, Ross scored twice to add his goal tally to three so far this season, in a 4–3 loss against Louisville City. After the match, Ross, along with Jack Gurr, were named USL Championship Team of the Week. On 25 September 2024, he signed a contract extension with Sacramento Republic. On 10 October 2024, Ross scored his fourth goal of the season, in a 2–2 draw against Monterey Bay. At the end of the 2024 season, he played in every matches, making thirty–eight appearances and scoring four times in all competitions.

At the start of the 2025 season, however, Ross suffered an injury and was out for a month. On 4 May 2025, he made his return from injury, coming on as an 82nd-minute substitute, in a 1–0 loss against Oakland Roots. Two weeks later on 17 May 2025, Ross scored his first goal of the season, in a 5–0 win against Las Vegas Lights. Following his return from injury, he regained his first team place, playing in the midfield position. Ross helped Sacramento Republic reach the final of USL Cup after beating Rhode Island on penalties following a 0–0 draw in the semi–finals. However, he started the match in the USL Cup final against Hartford Athletic, but the club went on to lose 1–0. At the end of the 2025 season, Ross made thirty–one appearances and scoring once in all competitions. Following this, Sacramento Republic began talks with him over a new contract.

=== Monterey Bay ===
On 23 January 2026 it was announced that Ross had departed Sacramento for fellow Northern California USL Championship side Monterey Bay FC.

== International career ==
In November 2010, Ross was selected by the Scotland U21 for the first time. He scored a goal on his debut in a win over Northern Ireland on 17 November 2010. On 10 August 2011, Ross made another appearance for Scotland U21, in a 3–1 win over Norway U21.

== Personal life ==
Ross grew up supporting Inverness Caledonian Thistle and attended Charleston Academy. Since moving to United States, he resided in the country with his wife, an American citizen, and their two children.

== Career statistics ==
As of 25 October 2019

Club	Season	Division	League		National Cup		League Cup		Other		Total	
Club	Season	Division	Apps	Goals	Apps	Goals	Apps	Goals	Apps	Goals	Apps	Goals
Inverness Caledonian Thistle	2009–10	Scottish First Division	6	1	0	0	2	0	2	0	10	1
Inverness Caledonian Thistle	2010–11	Scottish Premier League	34	1	2	0	3	0	0	0	39	1
Inverness Caledonian Thistle	2011–12	Scottish Premier League	29	2	2	0	1	0	0	0	32	2
Inverness Caledonian Thistle	2012–13	Scottish Premier League	21	3	1	0	0	0	0	0	22	3
Inverness Caledonian Thistle	2013–14	Scottish Premiership	33	1	2	2	4	1	0	0	39	4
Inverness Caledonian Thistle	2014–15	Scottish Premiership	26	3	6	0	0	0	0	0	32	3
Inverness Caledonian Thistle	Inverness Total		149	11	13	2	10	1	2	0	174	14
Dundee	2015–16	Scottish Premiership	37	1	4	0	1	0	0	0	42	1
Dundee	2016–17	Scottish Premiership	19	0	0	0	2	0	0	0	21	0
Dundee	Dundee Total		56	1	4	0	3	0	0	0	63	1
Sepsi OSK Sfântu Gheorghe	2017–18	Liga I	5	0	0	0	0	0	0	0	5	0
Sepsi OSK Sfântu Gheorghe	2018–19	Liga I	0	0	0	0	0	0	0	0	0	0
Brora Rangers	2018–19	Highland League	3	1	2	0	0	0	0	0	5	1
El Paso Locomotive	2019	USL Championship	29	2	0	0	0	0	0	0	29	2
Career total			241	14	19	2	13	1	2	0	275	16

== Honours ==
Inverness Caledonian Thistle

- Scottish Cup : 2014–15
