= Juan Sebastián Herrera =

Colombian footballer (born 1994)

Personal information
- Full name: Juan Sebastián Herrera Sanabria
- Date of birth: 4 November 1994 (age 32)
- Place of birth: Bucaramanga, Colombia
- Height: 5 ft 10 in (1.78 m)
- Position: Forward

Team information
- Current team: Fortaleza F.C.
- Number: 9

Senior career*
| Years | Team | Apps | (Gls) |
| 2012–2013 | Real Santander | 40 | (13) |
| 2014–2016 | Alianza Petrolera | 57 | (6) |
| 2016–2017 | Barranquilla | 32 | (14) |
| 2017 | Junior | 2 | (1) |
| 2018 | Jaguares de Córdoba | 4 | (0) |
| 2018 | Atlético Huila | 7 | (2) |
| 2019 | Cortuluá | 39 | (24) |
| 2020 | Macará | 30 | (11) |
| 2021 | Deportivo Pasto | 14 | (3) |
| 2021 | Junior | 8 | (0) |
| 2022 | Cortuluá | 8 | (2) |
| 2023–2025 | Sacramento Republic | 62 | (13) |
- * Club domestic league appearances and goals as of October 30, 2025

Juan Sebastián Herrera Sanabria (born 4 September 1994) is a Colombian professional footballer who plays as a forward for Fortaleza F.C..

== Career statistics ==
=== Club ===
As of match played 28 September 2020

Appearances and goals by club, season and competition
| Club | Season | League | | | Cup | | Other | | Total | |
| Club | Season | Division | Apps | Goals | Apps | Goals | Apps | Goals | Apps | Goals |
|---|---|---|---|---|---|---|---|---|---|---|
| Real Santander | 2012 | Categoría Primera B | 12 | 4 | 0 | 0 | — | — | 12 | 4 |
| Real Santander | 2013 | Categoría Primera B | 28 | 9 | 9 | 1 | — | — | 37 | 10 |
| Real Santander | Total | | 40 | 13 | 9 | 1 | 0 | 0 | 49 | 14 |
| Alianza Petrolera | 2014 | Categoría Primera A | 30 | 5 | 7 | 2 | — | — | 37 | 7 |
| Alianza Petrolera | 2015 | Categoría Primera A | 17 | 1 | 4 | 1 | — | — | 21 | 2 |
| Alianza Petrolera | 2016 | Categoría Primera A | 10 | 0 | 6 | 2 | — | — | 16 | 2 |
| Alianza Petrolera | Total | | 57 | 6 | 17 | 5 | 0 | 0 | 74 | 11 |
| Barranquilla | 2016 | Categoría Primera B | 16 | 7 | 0 | 0 | — | — | 16 | 7 |
| Barranquilla | 2017 | Categoría Primera B | 16 | 7 | 5 | 1 | — | — | 21 | 8 |
| Barranquilla | Total | | 32 | 14 | 5 | 1 | 0 | 0 | 37 | 15 |
| Junior | 2017 | Categoría Primera A | 2 | 1 | 0 | 0 | — | — | 2 | 1 |
| Jaguares | 2018 | Categoría Primera A | 4 | 0 | 0 | 0 | 0 | 0 | 4 | 0 |
| Atlético Huila | 2018 | Categoría Primera A | 7 | 2 | 0 | 0 | — | — | 7 | 2 |
| Cortuluá | 2019 | Categoría Primera B | 39 | 24 | 0 | 0 | — | — | 39 | 24 |
| Macará | 2020 | Serie A | 14 | 7 | 0 | 0 | 2 | 0 | 39 | 24 |
| Career total | | | 195 | 67 | 31 | 7 | 2 | 0 | 228 | 74 |
