= Russell Cicerone =

American soccer player (born 1994)

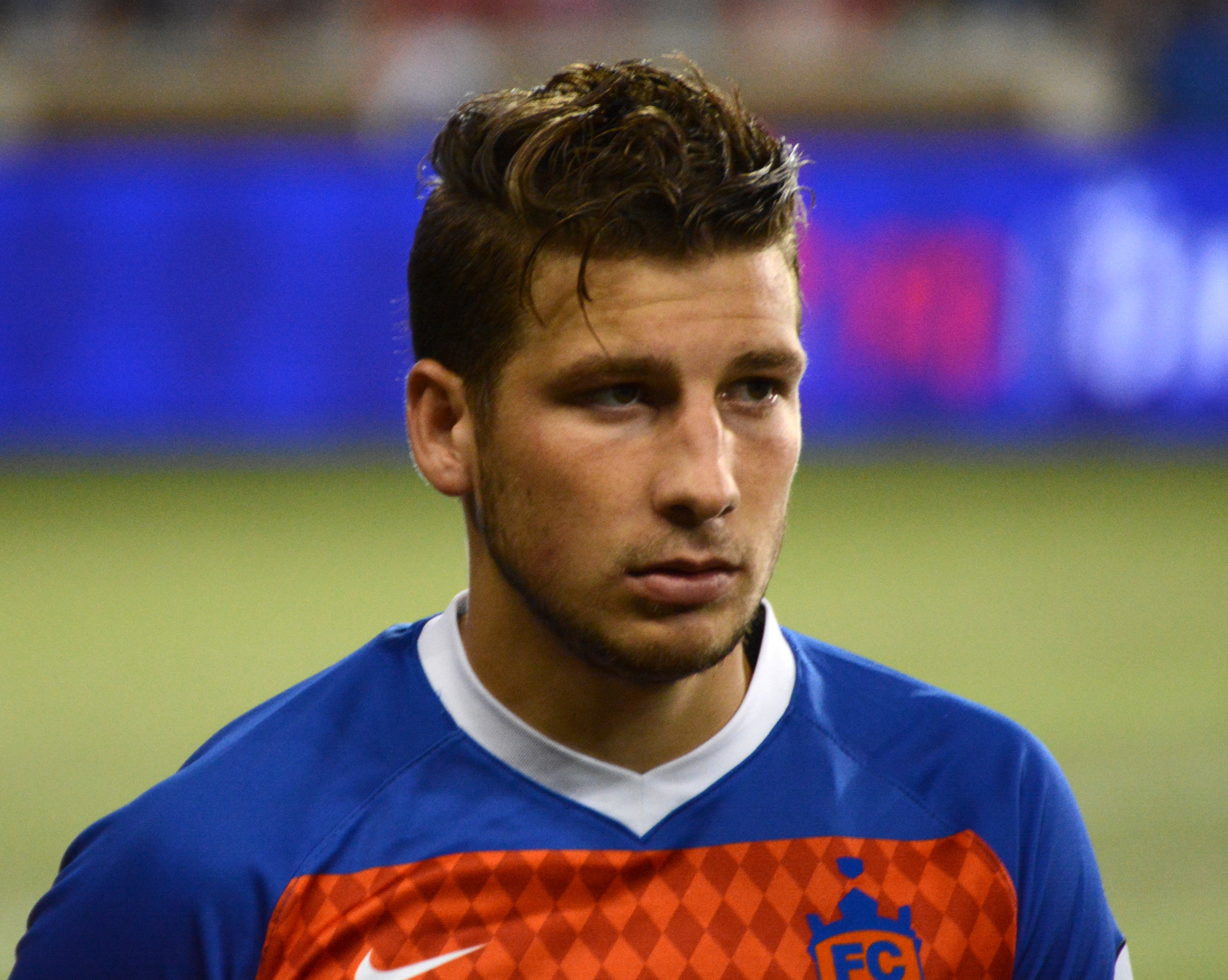
- Cicerone with FC Cincinnati in 2018

Personal information
- Date of birth: November 17, 1994 (age 31)
- Place of birth: Bloomfield Hills, Michigan, U.S.
- Height: 1.78 m (5 ft 10 in)
- Positions: Winger; forward

Team information
- Current team: Tampa Bay Rowdies
- Number: 10

Youth career
- Vardar Freiburg Academy

College career
Years	Team	Apps	(Gls)
2013–2016	Buffalo Bulls	71	(42)

Senior career*
Years	Team	Apps	(Gls)
2014	FC Buffalo	13	(8)
2015–2016	Michigan Bucks	22	(20)
2017	Portland Timbers 2	29	(1)
2018	FC Cincinnati	10	(1)
2019–2020	Saint Louis FC	49	(10)
2021–2022	Pittsburgh Riverhounds	66	(30)
2023–2025	Sacramento Republic	79	(28)
2026–	Tampa Bay Rowdies	26	(6)
- * Club domestic league appearances and goals as of 00:37, October 26, 2026 (UTC)

Russell Cicerone (born November 17, 1994) is an American soccer player who plays for Tampa Bay Rowdies of the USL Championship.

== Early life ==
Cicerone was born on November 17, 1994, to parents David and Mary. He grew up in Bloomfield Hills, Michigan, where he attended Brother Rice High School. Cicerone played on the school's soccer team, and served as team captain for one year. He also played soccer at Vardar Freiburg Academy as a high school senior.

== Career ==
=== Amateur and college ===
Cicerone spent four years playing college soccer at University at Buffalo between 2013 and 2016, where he scored 42 goals in 71 appearances, also tallying 22 assists.

Cicerone also appeared for USL PDL side Michigan Bucks in 2015 and 2016, helping to lead them to the league title in 2016

=== Professional ===
On January 17, 2017, Cicerone was selected in the fourth round, 76th overall, of the 2017 MLS SuperDraft by Portland Timbers. Cicerone joined United Soccer League side Portland Timbers 2 on March 17, 2017.

Cicerone was announced to join USL side FC Cincinnati on November 21, 2017.

On December 16, 2018, Cicerone joined USL side Saint Louis FC ahead of their 2019 season.

Following Saint Louis FC folding at the end of the 2020 season, Cicerone joined USL Championship side Pittsburgh Riverhounds SC on December 17, 2020.

On December 2, 2022, Cicerone was announced as a new signing for USL Championship side Sacramento Republic ahead of the 2023 season.

== Personal life ==
At the University at Buffalo, Cicerone's academic major was biomedical sciences. Cicerone has an older sister, Anina, who also majored in biomedical sciences. She attended Western Michigan University, where she was a regular starter on the women's soccer team.

Cicerone is of Italian descent through his paternal grandfather.
