= Jared Timmer =

American soccer player (born 1997)

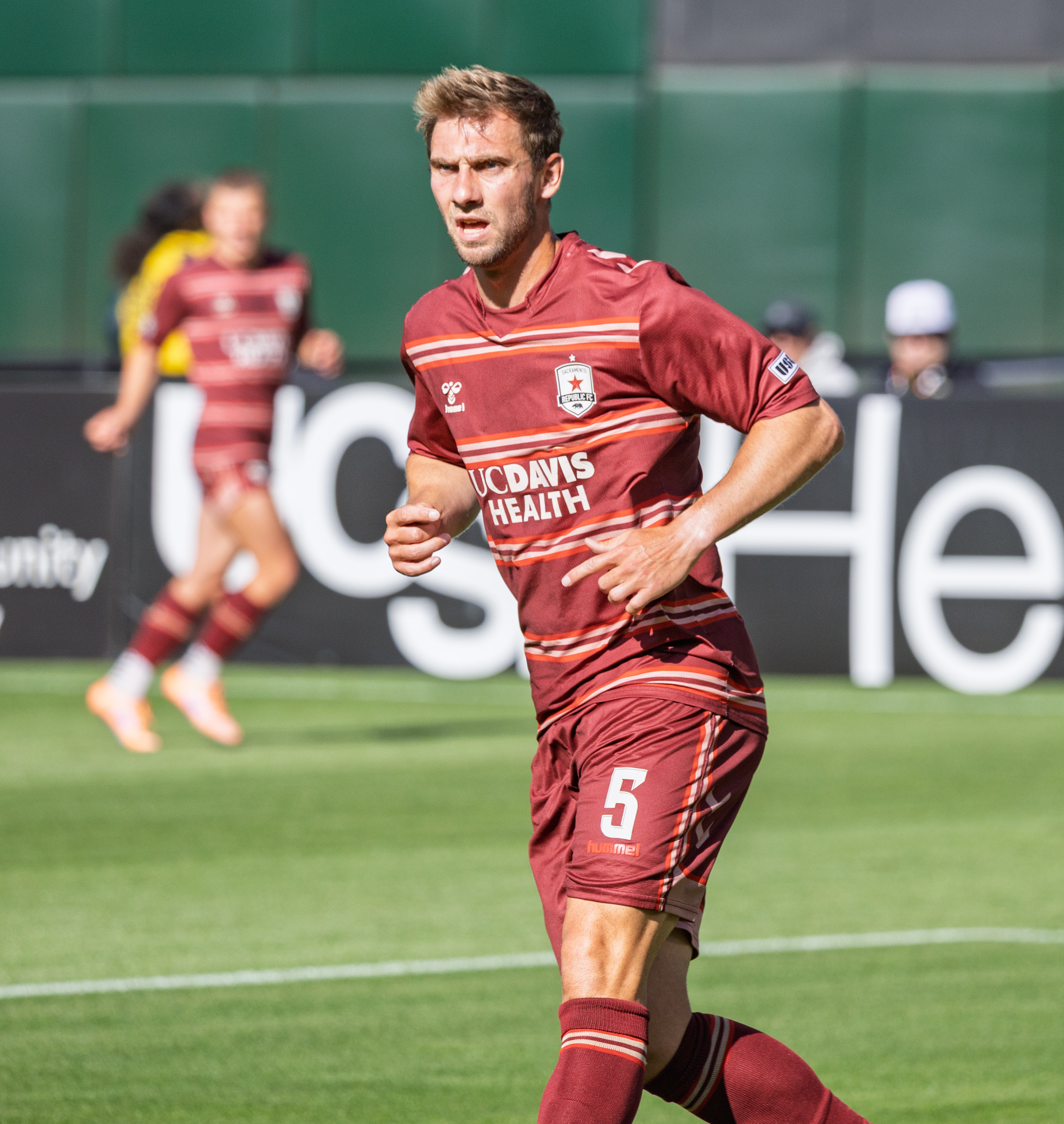
- Timmer with the Sacramento Republic in 2026

Personal information
- Date of birth: April 29, 1997 (age 29)
- Place of birth: Hudsonville, Michigan, United States
- Height: 1.83 m (6 ft 0 in)
- Position: Defender

Team information
- Current team: Sacramento Republic
- Number: 5

Youth career
- Grand Rapids Crew Juniors

College career
Years	Team	Apps	(Gls)
2015–2019	Butler Bulldogs	67	(6)

Senior career*
Years	Team	Apps	(Gls)
2016	Grand Rapids FC	4	(2)
2017–2019	Flint City Bucks	29	(3)
2020	Reno 1868	13	(0)
2021–2022	Indy Eleven	61	(0)
2023–	Sacramento Republic	106	(3)
- * Club domestic league appearances and goals as of November 11, 2026

Jared Timmer (born April 29, 1997) is an American soccer player who currently plays for Sacramento Republic in the USL Championship.

== Career ==
=== College and amateur ===
Timmer played college soccer for over five seasons at Butler University between 2015 and 2019, making 67 appearances, scoring 6 goals and tallying 13 assists. Timmer captained the team for his final three seasons at Butler.

Whilst at college, Timmer played with NPSL side Grand Rapids FC in 2016. In 2017, 2018 and 2019, Timmer played in the USL League Two with Flint City Bucks, helping the team win the USL League Two title in 2019.

=== Professional ===
On March 3, 2020, Timmer joined USL Championship side Reno 1868. He made his debut on July 29, 2020, appearing as a half-time substitute during a 4–1 win over Portland Timbers 2. Reno folded their team on November 6, 2020, due to the financial impact of the COVID-19 pandemic.

On December 11, 2020, Timmer joined USL Championship club Indy Eleven ahead of their 2021 season. He was released by Indy Eleven on November 30, 2022, following the conclusion of the 2022 season.

Timmer was announced as a new signing USL Championship side Sacramento Republic ahead of their 2023 season.
