= Luis Felipe Fernandes =

American soccer player (born 1996)

Luis Felipe
Personal information
- Full name: Luis Felipe Fernandes Rodrigues
- Date of birth: January 29, 1996 (age 30)
- Place of birth: Mineola, New York, U.S.
- Height: 6 ft 2 in (1.88 m)
- Position: Midfielder

Team information
- Current team: Lexington SC

Youth career
- Cruzeiro

Senior career*
Years	Team	Apps	(Gls)
2016	Fort Lauderdale Strikers	37	(0)
2017	Reno 1868	26	(5)
2018–2020	San Jose Earthquakes	21	(0)
2018	→ Reno 1868 (loan)	13	(1)
2021–2025	Sacramento Republic	142	(15)
2026–	Lexington SC	0	(0)

International career^{‡}
- United States U20
- * Club domestic league appearances and goals as of October 31, 2026 ‡ National team caps and goals as of May 5, 2016

Luis Felipe Fernandes Rodrigues (born January 29, 1996), or simply Luis Felipe, is an American professional soccer player who currently plays for USL Championship side Lexington SC.

== Career ==
=== North American Soccer League ===
On January 25, 2016, he signed his first professional contract with the Fort Lauderdale Strikers. He was praised by Head Coach and General Manager Caio Zanardi: “We are confident that in our system he can develop his potential and blossom into a wonderful player for our team.” He started his first match on April 7, 2016, and his performance was considered "shining". Luis Felipe Fernandes was in 2016's season the player of Fort Lauderdale Strikers with most minutes played. He was nominated for the Young Player of the Year of NASL.

=== United Soccer League ===
Luis Felipe signed with USL side and San Jose Earthquakes affiliate Reno 1868 FC on May 12, 2017. He scored his first goal for the team on June 7 in Reno's 3–2 victory over Rio Grande Valley FC and assisted the winning goal eleven minutes later. Fernandes made his first appearance for San Jose as a 33rd minute substitution for Tommy Thompson during the MLS side's 4-1 friendly victory over Eintracht Frankfurt.

=== Major League Soccer ===
Luis Felipe was signed by the San Jose Earthquakes on December 14, 2017, along with Reno teammates Chris Wehan and Jimmy Ockford. He was then sent back to Reno on a temporary loan basis, playing in Reno's 2018 home opener against Swope Park Rangers.

Following the 2020 season, San Jose declined their option on Fernandes.

=== Return to the USL ===
On January 29, 2021, Felipe signed with USL Championship side Sacramento Republic.

On December 10, 2025, Felipe signed a multi-year deal with Lexington SC.

== Statistics ==
Statistics accurate as of 19 March 2018.

Club	Season	League		Open Cup		MLS Cup		Total	
Club	Season	Apps	Goals	Apps	Goals	Apps	Goals	Apps	Goals
Fort Lauderdale Strikers	2016	31	0	4	0	–	–	35	0
Total		31	0	4	0	–	–	35	0
Reno 1868 FC	2017	27	5	2	0	–	–	29	5
Total		27	5	2	0	–	–	29	5
San Jose Earthquakes	2018	0	0	0	0	0	0	0	0
Total		0	0	0	0	0	0	0	0
Reno 1868 FC (loan)	2018	1	0	0	0	0	0	1	0
Total		1	0	0	0	0	0	1	0
Career Total		59	5	6	0	0	0	65	5
