= Heart Health Park =

Sports venue in Sacramento, California

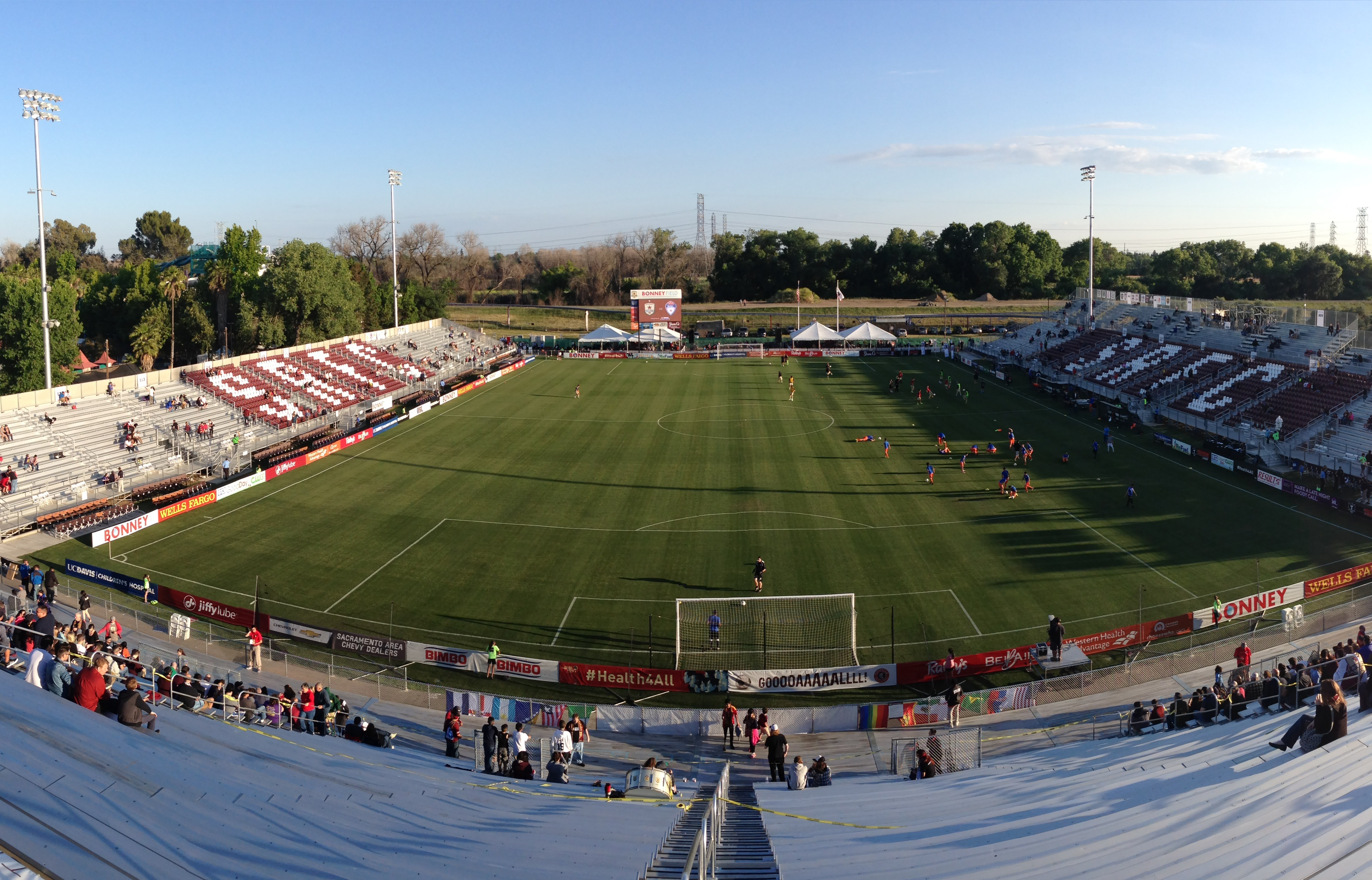
- Bonney Field prior to a 2015 US Open Cup match
- Interactive map of Heart Health Park
- Former names: Cal Expo Multi-Use Sports Field Facility (planning/construction); Bonney Field (2014–2017); Papa Murphy's Park (2017–2021)
- Address: 1600 Exposition Blvd; Sacramento, California, United States 95815-5104
- Location: Cal Expo
- Coordinates: 38°35′28″N 121°26′17″W
- Owner: Cal Expo
- Operator: Spectra
- Capacity: 11,569
- Field size: 116 x 74 yards (106 x 68 meters)

Construction
- Groundbreaking: March 2014
- Opened: June 20, 2014
- Cost: $3 million ($4.08 million in 2025 dollars)

Tenants
- Sacramento Republic FC (USLC) (2014–present); Sacramento Express (PRO Rugby) (2016)

Heart Health Park is a sports venue located on the grounds of Cal Expo in Sacramento, California, United States. The soccer-specific stadium has a capacity of 11,569 and includes a full-sized (120 x 80 yard) soccer field. Heart Health Park is the current home of Sacramento Republic FC soccer team and former home of PRO Rugby team, Sacramento Express.

The field is located on the former site of the Cal Expo Amphitheatre, and is bordered on the west and south by the Cal Expo monorail, and on the east by Raging Waters water park.

== History ==
Construction of the stadium began in March 2014, following approval by the Cal Expo Board of Directors. Funding for the stadium came from an agreement between Ovations Food Services, Cal Expo, and the Republic FC. Original schedules put the grand opening for the Republic FC's June 7 match against Arizona United, but that date was postponed two weeks, with the grand opening falling instead on June 20, when the Republic FC played the reserve team of the Colorado Rapids in a match that ended in a victory for the Republic.

The name of the stadium was originally Cal Expo Multi-Use Sports Field Facility, but on April 21, 2014, Republic FC President Warren Smith announced a multi-year deal with Bonney Plumbing, Heating, Air and Rooter Service for the naming rights of the stadium and the name was changed to Bonney Field.

On March 9, 2017, Republic FC announced that the facility would be renamed Papa Murphy's Park, in a multi-year naming rights agreement with Papa Murphy's.

On May 5, 2021, the Sacramento Republic FC and Western Health Advantage agreed to a new naming rights deal that would change the name of the stadium to Heart Health Park.

== Structure ==
Heart Health Park is open-ended, with the south endline lacking a grandstand but hosting the VIP section. The north endline is home to the Tower Bridge Battalion, the SRFC supporters group. The team benches and premium seating are located along the west sideline.

== Soccer ==
Heart Health Park is the home stadium for the Sacramento Republic FC soccer team of the USL. The Republic hosted its first match at Heart Health Park on June 20, 2014. In addition to USL Pro matches, Heart Health Park also hosted Republic friendly matches against visiting foreign teams, such as Mexican Premier Division team Club Atlas, Scottish Premiership team Rangers F.C., and Premier League team West Bromwich Albion F.C.

== Rugby Union ==
Heart Health Park was the home of the Sacramento Express that played in the PRO Rugby competition. Heart Health Park has hosted several international rugby matches:

Date	Home	Result	Away	Competition	Attendance	Ref.
June 21, 2014	United States	38–35	Canada	Pacific Nations Cup	7,804	
July 24, 2015	Fiji	30–30	Samoa	Pacific Nations Cup	5,500	
July 24, 2015	United States	23–18	Japan	Pacific Nations Cup	8,300	
June 25, 2016	United States	25–0	Russia	friendly	—N/a	
February 8, 2018	United States	29–10	Canada	Americas Rugby Championship	2,500	
September 6, 2025	United States	21–47	Japan	Pacific Nations Cup	6,079	

== Expansion ==
After a successful inaugural season for the Republic FC, which consisted of 16 sell-outs in 17 matches and a USL Pro championship at Heart Health Park, Smith indicated plans to expand the stadium by 2,000 to 3,000 seats for the 2015 USL Pro season. The expansion project, which forced a reschedule of the 2015 home opener, added approximately 1,300 sideline seats, 2,500 endline seats, and an expanded market area.
