= Jack Gurr =

English footballer (born 1995)

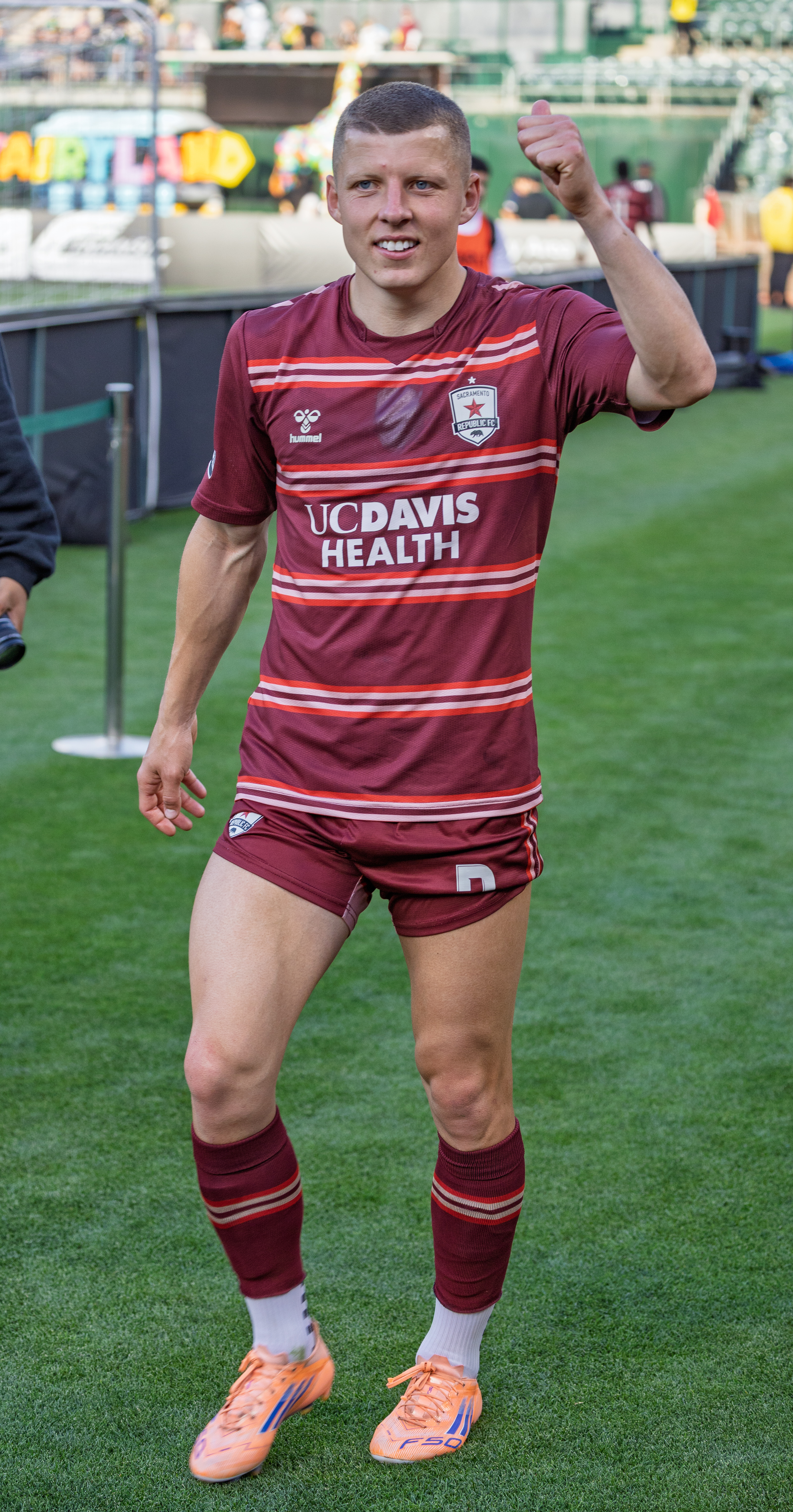
- Gurr in 2026

Personal information
- Full name: Jack William Gurr
- Date of birth: 26 November 1995 (age 30)
- Place of birth: Newcastle upon Tyne, England
- Height: 1.73 m (5 ft 8 in)
- Position: Full-back

Team information
- Current team: Sacramento Republic
- Number: 2

Youth career
- 2011–2014: Gateshead

College career
Years	Team	Apps	(Gls)
2014–2017	Georgia Gwinnett Grizzlies	71	(14)

Senior career*
Years	Team	Apps	(Gls)
2018–2019	Georgia Revolution	18	(1)
2020–2021	Atlanta United 2	17	(1)
2021	Atlanta United	1	(0)
2021–2022	Aberdeen	4	(0)
2022–	Sacramento Republic	141	(10)
- * Club domestic league appearances and goals as of 11:49, 11 November 2026 (UTC)

Jack William Gurr (born 26 November 1995) is an English professional footballer who plays as a full-back for Sacramento Republic in the USL Championship.

== Career ==
=== Youth, college and semi-professional ===
Gurr spent time with the academy team at Gateshead before moving to the United States in 2014 to play college soccer at Georgia Gwinnett College. He played four years for the Grizzlies, making 71 appearances and scoring 14 goals, and earning first team All-Association of Independent Institutions honours during his junior and senior seasons.

Following college, Gurr played two seasons with National Premier Soccer League club Georgia Revolution in 2018 and 2019.

=== Atlanta United ===
On 5 December 2019, it was announced that Gurr signed with USL Championship club Atlanta United 2 ahead of their 2020 season. He made his professional debut on 8 March 2020, starting in a 1–0 loss to Charleston Battery.

On 5 April 2021, Gurr was signed to the Atlanta United first-team roster, but he was waived by the club less than two months later, on 28 May 2021.

=== Aberdeen ===
On 21 June 2021, Gurr returned to the United Kingdom to join Scottish Premiership side Aberdeen, joining the club on a one-year deal.

=== Sacramento Republic ===
On 19 January 2022, Gurr returned to the United States to sign with USL Championship club Sacramento Republic.
