= 2023 Orange County SC season =

Sports season

Orange County SC
2023 season
- Manager: Richard Chaplow (until May 1); Morten Karlsen (Interim) (from May 1)
- Stadium: Championship Soccer Stadium; Irvine, California
- USL Championship: Western Conf.: 2nd Overall: 5th
- USL Championship Playoffs: Conference Semifinals
- U.S. Open Cup: Third Round
- Top goalscorer: League: Milan Iloski (17 goals); All: Milan Iloski (20 goals)
- Highest home attendance: 5,500 (5 times)
- Lowest home attendance: League: 3,047 (May 17 v.s. Sacramento Republic FC); Open Cup: 1,588 (Second Round, April 5 vs Capo FC)
- Average home league attendance: 4,475

The 2023 Orange County SC season was the club's thirteenth season of existence, and their thirteenth consecutive season in the United Soccer League Championship, the second tier of American soccer.

Orange County had a tumultuous start, only winning one out of their first eight games with a 1-4-3 record, leading to the team firing head coach Richard Chaplow and promoting the newly hired assistant coach Morten Karlsen to interim head coach on May 1, 2023. Under new management, Orange County found form and finished the season on a three-game winning streak, going from 11th to 2nd place in the Western Conference, and having a final record of 17–11–6.

In the first round of the USL Championship playoffs, Orange County faced off against seventh seeded El Paso Locomotive FC at home, winning 1–0 with a goal from Forward Milan Iloski. In the semifinals, Orange County hosted 6th seed Phoenix Rising FC, losing 2–1 in extra time to the eventual champions.

This would be the last season that the team-leading goalscorer and All-League Second Team Iloski would play for Orange County, as after this season he made a transfer to FC Nordsjælland in the Danish Superliga in the January transfer window. Additionally, on November 10, appointed interim head coach Karlsen was signed to become the official head coach of Orange County.

== Roster ==
As of 13 June 2024

Note: Flags indicate national team as defined under FIFA eligibility rules; some limited exceptions apply. Players may hold more than one non-FIFA nationality.

No.	Pos.	Nation	Player
1	GK	USA	Colin Shutler (team captain)
2	DF	USA	Owen Lambe
3	DF	USA	Alex Villanueva
5	DF	USA	Dillon Powers
7	FW	USA	Cameron Dunbar (on loan from Minnesota United FC)
7	FW	USA	Milan Iloski
8	MF	USA	Seth Casiple
9	FW	SCO	Marc McNulty
10	MF	USA	Brian Iloski
11	FW	USA	Bryce Jamison
14	DF	NOR	Morten Bjørshol
15	MF	USA	Ashish Chattha
16	DF	USA	Brent Richards

No.	Pos.	Nation	Player
19	MF	USA	Kevin Partida
21	FW	CMR	Thomas Amang
22	DF	USA	Joseph Buckley
23	DF	NOR	Ryan Doghman
24	FW	USA	Benjamin Barjolo
26	MF	USA	Kyle Scott
29	GK	USA	Juan Santana
30	DF	NOR	Markus Nakkim
32	FW	USA	Nicolas Ruiz
33	DF	USA	Ashton Miles
35	MF	USA	Benjamin Norris
36	GK	USA	Fernando Aguirre

=== Technical Staff ===
Role	Name
President of Soccer Operations & General Manager	Peter Nugent
Head Coach	Morten Karlsen
First Assistant Coach & IDP Manager	Paul Hardyman
Assistant Coach	Didier Crettenand
Goalkeeping Coach	Victor Nogueira
Performance Data Analyst	Amanda Preciado
Performance Consultant	Dan Guzman
Head Academy Scout	Shawn Beyer
Team Operations Coordinator	Mario Lemus

== Competitions ==
=== Exhibitions ===
Orange County, on January 31, announced six pre-season matches, with most matches being played against MLS Next and colligate teams behind closed doors.

February 11 Preseason	LA Galaxy II	1-2	Orange County SC	Carson, California
11:00 AM		Report		Stadium: HDC University Field 1 Attendance: 0

February 18 Preseason	Orange County SC	2-1	UC Irvine Anteaters	Irvine, California
11:00 AM	Osundina 31'; 89' (o.g.)	Report	46'	Stadium: Championship Soccer Stadium; Attendance: 0

February 25 Preseason	San Diego Loyal	3-0	Orange County SC	Carlsbad, California
		Report		Stadium: MiraCosta Stadium; Attendance: 0

March 1 Preseason	Orange County SC	v	Cal State Fullerton Titans	Irvine, California
8:00 PM		Report		Stadium: Championship Soccer Stadium
Note: Season ticket holder exclusive

March 4 Preseason	Orange County SC	1-0	Los Angeles FC 2	Irvine, California
10:30 AM	Iloski 60' (pen.)	Report		Stadium: Championship Soccer Stadium; Attendance: 0

March 4 Preseason	Orange County SC	4-1	UC Santa Barbara Gauchos	Irvine, California
2:00 PM	Chattha 5'; 26'; 57'; 89'	Report	67'	Stadium: Championship Soccer Stadium; Attendance: 0

=== USL Championship ===
==== Standings ====
Pos	Team	Pld	W	L	T	GF	GA	GD	Pts	Qualification
1	Sacramento Republic FC	34	18	6	10	51	26	+25	64	Playoffs
2	Orange County SC	34	17	11	6	46	39	+7	57	Playoffs
3	San Diego Loyal SC	34	16	9	9	61	43	+18	57	Playoffs
4	San Antonio FC	34	14	6	14	63	38	+25	56	Playoffs
5	Colorado Springs Switchbacks FC	34	16	13	5	49	42	+7	53	Playoffs

Source: USL Championship Standings
Rules for classification: 1) head-to-head points; 2) head-to-head goal differential; 3) points-per game within conference; 4) total wins; 5) total goal differential; 6) total goals scored; 7) points earned against top four Conference finishers; 8) disciplinary points; 9) coin toss or drawing of lots

==== Results summary ====
Overall								Home						Away					
Pld	W	D	L	GF	GA	GD	Pts	W	D	L	GF	GA	GD	W	D	L	GF	GA	GD
34	17	6	11	46	39	+7	57	9	3	5	21	14	+7	8	3	6	25	25	0

Source: USL standings

==== Match results ====
Orange County announced their full season schedule on January 9, 2023.

All times in Pacific Time.

=== March ===
March 11 1	Orange County SC	1-3	Louisville City FC	Irvine, California
7:00 PM	Richards (yellow card) 37'; Partida 40', (yellow card) 45' + 3'; Iloski (yellow card) 41'	Report	McCabe 4'; Lancaster (yellow card) 19', (goal) 57'; Totsch (yellow card) 71'; Mushangalusa 88'	Stadium: Championship Soccer Stadium; Attendance: 4,267; Referee: Ekaterina Koroleva

March 18 2	Orange County SC	1-1	Tampa Bay Rowdies	Irvine, California
7:00 PM	Chattha (yellow card) 34'; Nielsen 40'; Powers (yellow card) 90'	Report	Lasso (yellow card) 75'; Herivaux 82'	Stadium: Championship Soccer Stadium; Attendance: 4,278; Referee: Brandon Stevis

March 25 3	Orange County SC	2-2	Las Vegas Lights FC	Irvine, California
7:00 PM	Partida (yellow card) 45'+3'; Scott (yellow card) 56'; Villanueva 60'; Iloski 64'; Nakkim (yellow card) 90'+2'	Report	Torres 44', (yellow card) 50'; Botello-Faz 62'; Oteng (yellow card) 66'; Bushue (yellow card) 90'+5'	Stadium: Championship Soccer Stadium; Attendance: 3,959; Referee: Alexis Da Silva

=== April ===
April 1 4	Hartford Athletic	1-1	Orange County SC	Hartford, Connecticut
11:00 AM	Rad (yellow card) 6'; Amoh 45'+8'; Cedeno (yellow card) 65'; Hodge (yellow card) 70'; Barrera (yellow card) 72'; Logue (yellow card) 84'; McGlynn (yellow card) 90'+3'	Report	Iloski 7'; Nakkim (yellow card) 65'; Partida (yellow card) 81'; Doghman (yellow card) 87'; Richards (yellow card) 90'+5'; Scott (yellow card) 90'+5'	Stadium: Trinity Health Stadium; Attendance: 3,030; Referee: Eric Tattersall

April 8 5	El Paso Locomotive FC	1-0	Orange County SC	El Paso, Texas
6:30 PM	Lyons (yellow card) 4'; Pavkovics (yellow card) 6'; Solignac 19'; Zacarias (yellow card) 44'; Kostyshyn (yellow card) 74'	Report	Iloski (yellow card) 35'; Fox (yellow card) 58'; Buckley (yellow card) 88'	Stadium: Southwest University Park; Attendance: 6,013; Referee: Cristian Campo

April 15 6	Orange County SC	1-0	Indy Eleven	Irvine, California
7:00 PM	Iloski 30'; Jamison (yellow card) 56'; Scott (yellow card) 73'	Report	Diz Pe (yellow card) 23'; Blake (yellow card) 36'	Stadium: Championship Soccer Stadium; Attendance: 3,977; Referee: Ricardo Fierro

April 22 7	Orange County SC	1-2	Birmingham Legion FC	Irvine, California
7:00 PM	Nielsen 30'; Scott (yellow card) 55'; Partida (yellow card) 57'	Report	Agudelo 33'; Kavita (yellow card) 40'; Crognale (yellow card) 53'; Martínez 59', (yellow card) 64'	Stadium: Championship Soccer Stadium; Attendance: 4,114; Referee: Elvis Osmanovic

April 29 8	New Mexico United	3-1	Orange County SC	Albuquerque, New Mexico
6:00 PM	Hurst 22', 63'; Rivas 74'; Suggs (yellow card) 90'; Portillo (yellow card) 90'+2'	Report	Suggs 58' (o.g.); Casiple (yellow card) 90'+2'	Stadium: Rio Grande Credit Union Field at Isotopes Park; Attendance: 10,048; Referee: Sergii Boiko

=== May ===
May 6 9	Orange County SC	1-2	San Diego Loyal	Irvine, California
7:00 PM	Villanueva (yellow card) 18'; Iloski (yellow card) 59'; Richards (yellow card) 59'; Partida (yellow card) 60'; Doghman (yellow card) 80'; McNulty (yellow card) 86'; Powers (yellow card) 86'; Casiple (yellow card) 89'; Osundina 90'+6'	Report	Moshobane 15'; Corona 19' (pen.) (yellow card) 49'; Moon (yellow card) 59' (yellow-red card) 90'+5'; Riley (yellow card) 81'	Stadium: Championship Soccer Stadium; Attendance: 4,616; Referee: Elijio Arreguin

May 13 10	Oakland Roots	3-0	Orange County SC	Hayward, California
8:00 PM	Formella 30'; Morad 43'; Rito 78'	Report	Miles 90'+2'	Stadium: Pioneer Stadium; Attendance: 5,855; Referee: Corbyn May

May 17 11	Orange County SC	1-0	Sacramento Republic FC	Irvine, California
7:00 PM	Iloski 5'; Nakkim (yellow card) 23'; Lambe (yellow card) 42'; Pederssen (yellow card) 88'	Report	Lewis (yellow card) 46'; Keko (yellow card) 81'; López (yellow card) 87' (yellow-red card) 90'+5'	Stadium: Championship Soccer Stadium; Attendance: 3,047; Referee: Deshun Beard

May 20 12	Orange County SC	0-1	Phoenix Rising FC	Irvine, California
7:00 PM	Doghman (yellow card) 50'; Norris (yellow card) 71'; Nakkim (yellow card) 90'+3'	Report	Fuenmayor (yellow card) 5'; Arteaga 67'	Stadium: Championship Soccer Stadium; Attendance: 4,301; Referee: Alexis Da Silva

May 27 13	Miami FC	0-0	Orange County SC	Miami, Florida
4:00 P.M.	Chapman-Page (yellow card) 16'; Craig (yellow card) 20'; Murphy (yellow card) 45'+4'; Akinyode (yellow card) 60'; Cabral (yellow card) 90'+4'	Report	Pedersen (yellow card) 44'; Iloski 45'+4'	Stadium: FIU Football Stadium; Attendance: 1,374; Referee: Nabil Bensalah

=== June ===
June 3 14	Orange County SC	2-0	Rio Grande Valley FC Toros	Irvine, California
7:00 PM	Iloski 4'; Lambe (yellow card) 13'; Osundina 16'; Scott (yellow card) 45'+2'; Pedersen (yellow card) 77'	Report	Davilla (yellow card) 53'; Ruiz (yellow card) 75'	Stadium: Championship Soccer Stadium; Attendance: 4,268; Referee: Elvis Osmanovic

June 10 15	Colorado Springs Switchbacks FC	4-0	Orange County SC	Colorado Springs, Colorado
6:00 PM	Skundrich 28'; Williams 60'; Henríquez 71' (pen.); Rios 74'; Herrera (yellow card) 80'	Report	Iloski (yellow card) 47'; Pedersen (yellow card) 70'; McNulty (yellow card) 80'	Stadium: Weidner Field; Attendance: 6,930; Referee: Olvin Oliva

June 17 16	FC Tulsa	0-3	Orange County SC	Tulsa, Oklahoma
5:00	McCabe (yellow card) 18'; Yosef (yellow card) 27'; Malou (yellow card) 60' Fernandez (yellow card) 84'; Bonet (yellow card) 90'+5'	Report	Iloski 26'; Osundina (yellow card) 49'; Shutler (yellow card) 51'; Nakkim 90'; Amang 90'+6' (pen.)	Stadium: ONEOK Field; Attendance: 4,333; Referee: Jose Carlos Rivero

June 24 17	Detroit City FC	0-1	Orange County SC	Hamtramck, Michigan
4:30	Williams (yellow card) 63'; Lewis (yellow card) 70'; Carroll (yellow card) 72'	Report	Iloski 23'; Iloski (yellow card) 55'; McNulty (yellow card) 61'; Partida (yellow card) 65'; Nakkim (yellow card) 90'; Scott (red card) 90'+6'	Stadium: Keyworth Stadium; Attendance: 6,669; Referee: Alejo Calume

=== July ===
July 1 18	Orange County SC	3-1	Monterey Bay FC	Irvine, California
7:00 PM	Powers (yellow card) 33'; Amang 70', 90'+1' (pen.); Lambe 78'; Iloski (yellow card) 83'	Report	Rebollar (yellow card) 52'; Martínez (yellow card) 56'; Fehr (yellow card) 64'; Doner (yellow card) 75'	Stadium: Championship Soccer Stadium; Attendance: 5,500; Referee: Alex Beehler

July 9 19	Rio Grande Valley FC Toros	2-0	Orange County SC	Edinburg, Texas
5:00	Ritondale (yellow card) 14'; Coronado (yellow card) 54'; Ackwei 69'; Ricketts 78'; Davila (yellow card) 84'	Report	Casiple (yellow card) 22'; Iloski (yellow card) 43'; Iloski (yellow card) 87'	Stadium: H.E.B. Park; Attendance: 3,557; Referee: Nabil Bensalah

July 15 20	Loudoun United FC	1-3	Orange County SC	Leesburg, Virginia
4:30	Landry (yellow card) 23'; Hopkins 42'; Leerman (yellow card) 37' (yellow-red card) 90'+3'; Garay (yellow card) 45'+3'; Rocha (yellow card) 59'	Report	Nakkim (yellow card) 8'; McNulty 15'; Iloski 38' (pen.); Villanueva (yellow card) 69'; Osundina 84'; Amang (yellow card) 90'+3'	Stadium: Segra Field; Attendance: 2,458; Referee: Joe Surgan

July 22 21	Memphis 901 FC	3-4	Orange County SC	Memphis, Tennessee
5:30	Hyndman 6'; Buckmaster 22', (yellow card) 33' da Costa 44'; Kelly (yellow card) 68' (yellow-red card) 74'; Peters (yellow card) 70'; Ward (yellow card) 88'; Paul (yellow card) 90'; Lapa (red card) 90'+1'; Pickering (yellow card) 90'+4'	Report	Iloski 24', (yellow card) 43'; Doghman (yellow card) 31'; McNulty 32'; Powers (yellow card) 45'+2'; Doghman 45'+5'; Villanueva (yellow card) 77'; Jamison 86'	Stadium: AutoZone Park; Attendance: 3,971; Referee: John Griggs

July 29 22	Orange County SC	1-0	New Mexico United	Irvine, California
7:00	Chattha (yellow card) 63'; Iloski 80'; Amang (yellow card) 85'; Shutler (yellow card) 90'+5'	Report	Suggs (yellow card) 42'; Hamilton (yellow card) 74' (yellow-red card) 90'+7'; Seymore (yellow card) 84'	Stadium: Championship Soccer Stadium; Attendance: 5,500; Referee: Gabriele Giusti

=== August ===
August 5 23	San Diego Loyal	1-3	Orange County SC	San Diego, California
7:00	Conway 8'; Martin (yellow card) 35'; Stoneman (yellow card) 50'; Damus (yellow card) 59'	Report	Casiple (yellow card) 45'+1'; Scott (yellow card) 49'; Amang 52', 78', (yellow card) 53'; Iloski (yellow card) 60'; Shutler (yellow card) 85'; Osundina 90'+5'	Stadium: Torero Stadium; Attendance: 4,217; Referee: Malik Badawi

August 16 24	Orange County SC	1-0	Pittsburgh Riverhounds SC	Irvine, California
7:00 PM	Iloski 40'; Partida (yellow card) 63'; Jamison (yellow card) 71'; Richards (yellow card) 78'	Report	Farrell (yellow card) 14'; Ybarra (yellow card) 76'	Stadium: Championship Soccer Stadium; Attendance: 4,019; Referee: Brad Jensen

August 19 25	Orange County SC	2-0	Charleston Battery	Irvine, California
7:00 PM	B. Iloski 45'+1'; M. Iloski (yellow card) 48'; Scott (yellow card) 58'; Lambe 62'	Report	Wynne (yellow card) 26'; Palma (yellow card) 43'; Avila (yellow card) 45'+2'; Dodson (yellow card) 60'	Stadium: Championship Soccer Stadium; Attendance: 5,500; Referee: Elijio Arreguin

August 26 26	Sacramento Republic FC	0-2	Orange County SC	Sacramento, California
7:30		Report	Fox (yellow card) 19'; Amang 54'; Casiple 84'; Scott (yellow card) 84'	Stadium: Charles C. Hughes Stadium; Attendance: 20,231; Referee: Ricardo Fierro

=== September ===
September 2 27	Las Vegas Lights FC	1-5	Orange County SC	Las Vegas, Nevada
7:30	Bushue (yellow card) 35'; Carroll (yellow card) 41'; Rios 69'	Report	Iloski 13'; Amang 22'; Nakkim 38'; McNulty 82'; Lankford 89'	Stadium: Cashman Field; Referee: John Matto

September 9 28	Orange County SC	0-0	El Paso Locomotive FC	Irvine, California
7:00 PM	Scott (yellow card) 30'; Nakkim (yellow card) 69'; Partida (yellow card) 90'+1'; McNulty (yellow card) 90'+1'	Report	Navarro (yellow card) 20'; Lyons (yellow card) 33'; Hinds (yellow card) 35'; Rose (yellow card) 60'; Gómez (yellow card) 90'+70'	Stadium: Championship Soccer Stadium; Attendance: 5,500; Referee: Ramy Touchan

September 15 29	Orange County SC	0-1	Colorado Springs Switchbacks FC	Irvine, California
7:00	Partida (yellow card) 25'	Report	Echevarria (yellow card) 61'; Magee 84'; Herrera (yellow card) 90'+3'	Stadium: Championship Soccer Stadium; Attendance: 4,344; Referee: Sergii Demianchuk

September 23 30	San Antonio FC	4-0	Orange County SC	San Antonio, Texas
5:30	Fogaça 6', (yellow card) 21'; Hayes (yellow card) 44'; Yacoubou 50'; Oluwaseyi 57'; Patino 61', (yellow card) 62'; Taintor	Report	Iloski (yellow card) 51'; Casiple (yellow card) 53'; McNulty (yellow card) 67'; Nakkim (yellow card) 80'	Stadium: Toyota Field; Attendance: 7,513; Referee: Gerald Flores

September 30 31	Phoenix Rising FC	1-1	Orange County SC	Phoenix, Arizona
7:30	Hernández (yellow card) 70'; Traore (yellow card) 84'; Cuello 85'	Report	Iloski 61'; Fox (yellow card) 76'; Powers (yellow card) 84'	Stadium: Phoenix Rising Soccer Stadium; Attendance: 6,440; Referee: Matthew Thompson

=== October ===
October 4 32	Orange County SC	3-1	Oakland Roots SC	Irvine, California
7:00	Scott (yellow card) 22'; M. Iloski 45'+2' (pen.); Amang 45'+5'; B. Iloski 50'	Report	Peláez 11'; Diaz (yellow card) 15'; Tamacas (yellow card) 39'	Stadium: Championship Soccer Stadium; Attendance: 3,378; Referee: Elvis Osmanovic

October 7 33	Orange County SC	1-0	San Antonio FC	Irvine, California
7:00	Casiple (yellow card) 11'; Iloski 44'; McNulty (red card) 55'; Scott (yellow card) 59'; Fox (yellow card) 79'; Amang (yellow card) 82'	Report	Maloney (yellow card) 9'; Patino (yellow card) 50'; Azócar (yellow card) 59'; Boni (yellow card) 86'	Stadium: Championship Soccer Stadium; Attendance: 5,500; Referee: Brandon Stevis

October 14 34	Monterey Bay FC	0-1	Orange County SC	Seaside, California
7:00	Glasser (yellow card) 76'	Report	Lankford (yellow card) 22'; Iloski 39'; Partida (yellow card) 88' (yellow-red card) 90'+4'; Fox (yellow card) 90'+8'	Stadium: Cardinale Stadium; Attendance: 5,278; Referee: Eric Tattersall

==== USL Cup Playoffs ====
October 21 Western Conference Quarterfinals	Orange County SC	1-0	El Paso Locomotive FC	Irvine, California
7:30	Iloski 45'+1'; Scott (yellow card) 87'	Report	Dollenmayer (yellow card) 29'; Sonupe (yellow card) 58'; Rose (yellow card) 75'; Petrovic (yellow card) 86'; Díaz (red card) 90'+3'; Calvillo (yellow card) 90'+7'	Stadium: Championship Soccer Stadium; Attendance: 5,500; Referee: Natalie Simon

October 28 Western Conference Semifinals	Orange County SC	1-2 (a.e.t.)	Phoenix Rising FC	Irvine, California
7:00	Amang 24'; Scott (yellow card) 51'	Report	Trejo 7'; Fuenmayor (yellow card) 103'; Uzochokwu (yellow card) 106'; Cuello 116'	Stadium: Championship Soccer Stadium; Attendance: 5,500; Referee: Calin Radosav

=== U.S. Open Cup ===
As a member of the USL Championship, Orange County SC entered the tournament in the Second Round on April 5, 2023.

April 5 Second Round	Orange County SC	5-0	Capo FC	Irvine, California
7:00	Nielsen 33'; Jamison 45'+1'; Partida (yellow card) 58'; Iloski 69', 90'+3' (pen.); Chattha (yellow card) 84'; Amang 87'	Report	Loya (yellow card) 12'; Cervantes (yellow card) 24'; Montes (yellow card) 26' (yellow-red card) 62'; Vega (yellow card) 43'; Scalzo (yellow card) 57'; Olivia (yellow card) 84'	Stadium: Championship Soccer Stadium; Attendance: 1,588; Referee: Jervis Atagana

April 26 Third Round	Portland Timbers	3-1	Orange County SC	Portland, Oregon
7:30	Blanco (yellow card) 30'; Loría 37'; Clegg 48'; Sulte (yellow card) 90'+1'; Niezgoda 90'+2'	Report	Iloski 54', (yellow card) 57'	Stadium: Providence Park; Attendance: 11,639; Referee: Olvin Oliva
