= 2022 Orange County SC season =

Orange County SC
2022 season
- Owner: James Keston
- Head Coach: Richard Chaplow
- Stadium: Championship Soccer Stadium
- USL Championship: Western Conference: 13th League: 24th
- USL Championship Playoffs: Did not qualify
- U.S. Open Cup: Third Round
- Top goalscorer: League: Milan Iloski (22 goals); All: Milan Iloski (23 goals)

The 2022 Orange County SC season was the club's eleventh season of existence, and their eleventh consecutive season in the United Soccer League Championship, the second tier of American soccer.

Orange County came into the 2022 season the reigning champions of the USL Championship, after beating the Tampa Bay Rowdies to win the 2021 USL Championship Playoffs. However, the team failed to replicate their championship season, only winning seven games all season and placing last in the Western Conference with a record of 7–13–14.

At the end of the season, despite having one of the worst records in the league, starting forward Milan Iloski, with 22 league goals, won the USL Championship Golden Boot award for scoring the most goals in the 2022 season.

== Roster ==
As of June 26, 2024

Note: Flags indicate national team as defined under FIFA eligibility rules; some limited exceptions apply. Players may hold more than one non-FIFA nationality.

No.	Pos.	Nation	Player
1	GK	GER	Patrick Rakovsky
3	DF	USA	Alex Villanueva
4	DF	IRL	Rob Kiernan
5	DF	USA	Ahmed Longmire
5	MF	USA	Dillon Powers
6	DF	USA	Michael Orozco (Captain)
7	FW	USA	Milan Iloski
8	MF	USA	Seth Casiple
9	FW	MEX	Erick Torres
10	MF	USA	Brian Iloski
11	FW	USA	Bryce Jamison
12	MF	DEN	Daniel Pedersen
13	MF	USA	Thomas McCabe
14	MF	BLZ	Tony Rocha

No.	Pos.	Nation	Player
16	DF	USA	Brent Richards
18	FW	USA	Korede Osundina
19	FW	USA	Sean Okoli
20	GK	USA	Colin Shutler
22	MF	ALB	Albi Skendi
24	DF	HON	Danilo Acosta
25	MF	FIN	Mikko Kuningas
26	MF	USA	Kyle Scott
28	MF	USA	Jonathan Gomez
29	MF	KOR	Aloísio dos Santos Gonçalves
30	GK	USA	Juan Santana
31	MF	USA	Ian Hoffmann (On loan from Houston Dynamo 2)
32	FW	USA	Nicolas Ruiz
33	DF	USA	Ashton Miles

=== Technical staff ===
Role	Name
General Manager	Oliver Wyss
Assistant GM	Peter Nugent
Technical director	Frans Hoek
Head coach	Richard Chaplow
Assistant coach	Morten Karlsen
Strength & Conditioning	Claudio Trabattoni
Asst Strength & Conditioning	Dan Sparks
Goalkeeping coach	Victor Nogueira
Team Operations	Jakob Harding
Athletic Trainer	Mitchell Deyhle
U23 Head Coach	Jerry Tamashiro
U23 Assistant Coach	Didier Crettenand

== Competitions ==
=== Preseason ===
In preparation for the 2022 USL Championship season, Orange County played in five pre-season friendlies, mainly against fellow USL Championship teams. They announced these pre-season matches on February 16, 2022.

February 12 Preseason	Orange County SC	2-0	New Mexico United	San Diego, California
7:00 PM		Report		Stadium: Triton Soccer Stadium

February 19 Preseason	UC Irvine Anteaters	v	Orange County SC	Irvine, California
				Stadium: Anteater Stadium

February 26 Preseason	Orange County SC	v	UC Riverside Highlanders	Irvine, California
				Stadium: Championship Soccer Stadium

March 2 Preseason	Orange County SC	v	Las Vegas Lights FC	Irvine, California
				Stadium: Championship Soccer Stadium

March 5 Preseason	Orange County SC	v	LA Galaxy II	Irvine, California
				Stadium: Championship Soccer Stadium

=== USL Championship ===
==== Standings ====
Pos	Team	Pld	W	L	T	GF	GA	GD	Pts
9	Las Vegas Lights FC	34	12	13	9	40	50	−10	45
10	Phoenix Rising FC	34	12	16	6	50	58	−8	42
11	LA Galaxy II	34	11	16	7	53	63	−10	40
12	Monterey Bay FC	34	12	18	4	42	59	−17	40
13	Orange County SC	34	7	14	13	49	59	−10	34

Source: USL Championship Standings
Rules for classification: 1) head-to-head points; 2) head-to-head goal differential; 3) points-per game within conference; 4) total wins; 5) total goal differential; 6) total goals scored; 7) points earned against top four Conference finishers; 8) disciplinary points; 9) coin toss or drawing of lots

==== Results summary ====
Overall								Home						Away					
Pld	W	D	L	GF	GA	GD	Pts	W	D	L	GF	GA	GD	W	D	L	GF	GA	GD
34	7	13	14	49	54	−5	34	5	8	4	28	24	+4	2	5	10	21	30	−9

==== Match results ====
On January 12, 2022, Orange County released their full regular season schedule.

All times are in Pacific Standard Time.

===== March =====
March 12 1	Colorado Springs Switchbacks FC	2-1	Orange County SC	Colorado Springs, Colorado
5:00 PM	Barry (yellow card) 19'; Ngalina 37'; Johnson 51'; Erdmann (yellow card) 54'; Ockford (yellow card) 69'; Lindley (yellow card) 71'; Echevarria (yellow card) 88'; Belmar (yellow card) 90+4'	Report	Henry (yellow card) 8'; Acosta (yellow card) 70'; Iloski 82'	Stadium: Weidner Field; Attendance: 5,036

March 19 2	Orange County SC	2-1	Rio Grande Valley FC Toros	Irvine, California
7:00 PM	Kuningas (yellow card) 39'; Henry (yellow card) 65'; Okoli 79', 90+9', (yellow card) 90+9'	Report	Ycaza (yellow card) 26' (yellow-red card) 55'; Ruiz (yellow card) 43'; Martinez (yellow card) 77'; Lopez 86'; Sáez (yellow card) 90+8'	Stadium: Championship Soccer Stadium; Attendance: 5,061

March 26 3	New Mexico United	1-1	Orange County SC	Albuquerque, New Mexico
3:00 PM	Seymore (yellow card) 38'; Swartz 78'	Report	Kuningas (yellow card) 50'; Skendi (yellow card) 72'; Iloski 90+1', (yellow card) 90+1'	Stadium: Isotopes Park; Attendance: 10,676

===== April =====
April 9 4	Orange County SC	0-1	San Antonio FC	Irvine, California
7:00 PM	Orozco (yellow card) 53'; Kuningas (yellow card) 90+6'	Report	Giro (yellow card) 20'; Collier 60'; Traore (yellow card) 63'; Dhillon (yellow card) 90+1'; Gomez (yellow card) 90+6'	Stadium: Championship Soccer Stadium; Attendance: 4,167; Referee: Ricardo Fierro

April 16 5	Orange County SC	1-1	Sacramento Republic FC	Irvine, California
7:00 PM	Torres 26' (pen.); Kuningas (yellow card) 30'; Henry (yellow card) 31'; Villanueva (yellow card) 72'; Osundina (yellow card) 90+3'	Report	Viader 2'; Gurr (yellow card) 24'; LaGrassa (yellow card) 28'; Desmond (yellow card) 58'; Cuello (yellow card) 75'; Lopez (yellow card) 87'	Stadium: Championship Soccer Stadium; Attendance: 3,692; Referee: Melvin Rivas

April 24 6	Indy Eleven	3-1	Orange County SC	Indianapolis, Indiana
2:30 PM	Powder 54', (yellow card) 55'; Pinho 65'; Aguilera (yellow card) 89'; Briggs	Report	Kuningas 13'; Henry (yellow card) 45+3'	Stadium: Michael A. Carroll Stadium; Attendance: 5,736; Referee: Elijio Arreguin

April 30 7	Rio Grande Valley FC Toros	1-2	Orange County SC	Edinburg, Texas
5:30 PM	Ruiz 5'; Borczak (yellow card) 71'; Coronado (yellow card) 81'	Report	Torres 3' 39'; Rocha (yellow card) 59'; Richards (yellow card) 61'; Orozco (yellow card) 90+7'; Kuningas (yellow card) 90+8'	Stadium: H-E-B Park; Attendance: 3,316; Referee: Matthew Corrigan

===== May =====
May 7 8	Orange County SC	2-2	Oakland Roots	Irvine, California
7:00 PM	Okoli 21'; Skendi 35'; Orozco (yellow card) 55'	Report	Hernández (yellow card) 14'; Rito 68'; Morad (yellow card) 87'; Karlsson 90+4'	Stadium: Championship Soccer Stadium; Attendance: 4,084; Referee: Elton García

May 13 9	Orange County SC	5-1	FC Tulsa	Irvine, California
7:00 PM	Torres 5'; Iloski 9' 20' 45+1'; Pedersen 30'	Report	Diz (red card) 28'; Gómez (yellow card) 33'; Bird (yellow card) 41'; Brown 90+2'	Stadium: Championship Soccer Stadium; Attendance: 4,020; Referee: Greg Dopka

May 21 10	Orange County SC	2-2	El Paso Locomotive FC	Irvine, California
7:00 PM	Gorskie (yellow card) 25'; Iloski 30'; Pedersen; Torres 78'	Report	Hinds (yellow card) 16'; Soligna 52'; Yuma (yellow card) 55'; Luna (yellow card) 70'; Gómez (yellow card) 87'	Stadium: Championship Soccer Stadium; Attendance: 4,477; Referee: Natalie Simon

May 27 11	Atlanta United 2	0-0	Orange County SC	Kennesaw, Georgia
4:30	Firmino (yellow card) 2'; Lambe (yellow card) 26'; Brennan (yellow card) 81'	Report	Pedersen (yellow card) 80'; Shutler (yellow card) 84'	Stadium: Fifth Third Bank Stadium; Attendance: 749; Referee: Alyssa Nichols

===== June =====
June 1 12	Oakland Roots	3-2	Orange County SC	Oakland, California
7:00 PM	Karlsson 9' 90+5'; Formella (yellow card) 35'; Barbir (yellow card) 81'; Azócar 90+3'; Rodriguez (yellow card) 90+6'	Report	Torres 32'; Skendi 65'; Richards (yellow card) 72'; Gorskie (yellow card) 90+4'	Stadium: Laney Football Stadium; Attendance: 3,092; Referee: Ricardo Fierro

June 4 13	Orange County SC	1-2	New Mexico United	Irvine, California
6:00 PM	McCabe (yellow card) 17'; Iloski 90+1'	Report	Portillo 18' (pen.) (yellow card) 71'; Wehan 32' (yellow card) 49'; Rivas (yellow card) 60'; Seymore (yellow card) 78'; Sandoval (yellow card) 87'	Stadium: Championship Soccer Stadium; Attendance: 5,135; Referee: Mark Allatin

June 11 14	Las Vegas Lights FC	3-0	Orange County SC	Las Vegas, Nevada
7:30	Crisostomo (yellow card) 3'; Skendi 21' (o.g.); Trejo (yellow card) 64'; Jennings 86' (pen.)	Report	Iloski (yellow card) 59'	Stadium: Cashman Field; Referee: Benjamin Meyer

June 18 15	Louisville City FC	3-1	Orange County SC	Louisville, Kentucky
5:00 PM	Mushagalusa 40'; Dia (yellow card) 65'; Totsch 75' (pen.); Harris 85' (pen.); Wynder (yellow card) 87'; Charpie (yellow card) 90+5'; Ownby (yellow card) 90+5'	Report	Pedersen (yellow card) 26'; Skendi (yellow card) 39'; Torres 44'; Osundina (yellow card) 49'; Partida (yellow card) 83'	Stadium: Lynn Family Stadium; Attendance: 10,848; Referee: Kevin Broadley

June 25 16	Orange County SC	3-1	Loudoun United FC	Irvine, California
5:00 PM	Iloski 4' 90+4'; Pedersen (yellow card) 27' (yellow-red card) 69'; Orozco (yellow card) 52'; Torres 58'	Report	Lehland 2'; Landry (yellow card) 19'; Guediri (yellow card) 32'	Stadium: Championship Soccer Stadium; Attendance: 4,119; Referee: Joseph Salinas

June 29 17	San Diego Loyal	2-1	Orange County SC	San Diego, California
7:00 PM	Guido 20' 45' (pen.); Vassell (red card) 35'; Moon 83'	Report	Iloski 22'; Longmire (red card) 36'; Hoffman (yellow card) 45+3'; Gutiérrez (yellow card) 74'	Stadium: Torero Stadium; Attendance: 5,146; Referee: Ricardo Fierro

===== July =====
July 2 18	Phoenix Rising FC	2-2	Orange County SC	Chandler, Arizona
7:30 PM	Lambert (yellow card) 15'; Skendi 42' (o.g.); Quinn (yellow card) 78'; Repetto (yellow card) 80'; Calistri (yellow card) 89'; Antwi 90+4'	Report	Iloski 6' 52' (yellow card) 90+8'; Partida (yellow card) 30' (yellow-red card) 81'; Orozco (red card) 80'	Stadium: Phoenix Rising Stadium; Referee: Michael Radchuk

July 9 19	Orange County SC	0-2	Monterey Bay FC	Irvine, California
7:00	McCabe (yellow card) 30'; Villanueva (yellow card) 36'; Skendi (yellow card) 79'; Pedersen (yellow card) 81'	Report	Volesky (yellow card) 14' (goal) 62'; Boone 36'; Robbie CrawfordCrawford (yellow card) 68'; Greene (yellow card) 73'	Stadium: Championship Soccer Stadium; Attendance: 4,008; Referee: Elvis Osmanovic

July 16 20	Orange County SC	0-0	Miami FC	Irvine, California
5:00 PM	Powers (yellow card) 20'; Hoffman (yellow card) 48'; Iloski (yellow card) 90+3'	Report	Segbres (yellow card) 53'; Williams (yellow card) 86'; Sorto (yellow card) 90+5'	Stadium: Championship Soccer Stadium; Attendance: 3,869; Referee: Brandon Stevis

July 23 21	LA Galaxy II	2-5	Orange County SC	Carson, California
7:00	Judd 3'; Pérez 85'	Report	Tores 32'; Iloski 46' 72'; Skendi 48'; Okoli 79'	Stadium: Dignity Health Sports Park

July 30 22	Orange County SC	2-3	San Diego Loyal	Irvine, California
7:00 PM	Iloski 10' 66' (yellow card) 90+7'; Partida (yellow card) 27'; Hoffman (yellow card) 30'; Orozco (yellow card) 49'; Villanueva (yellow card) 56'; Casiple (yellow card) 59'; Skendi (yellow card) 90+5'	Report	Stoneman 39'; Amang 69'; Conway 85'; Metcalf (yellow card) 87'	Stadium: Championship Soccer Stadium; Attendance: 5,177; Referee: Elton García

===== August =====
August 6 23	Orange County SC	3-3	Colorado Springs Switchbacks FC	Irvine, California
7:00 PM	Okoli 45+1' (pen.); McCabe 46'; Partida (yellow card) 54'; Powers 74'; Hoffman (yellow card) 90'	Report	Ngalina 35'; Amoh (yellow card) 73' (goal) 80'; Barry 90+2' (pen.)	Stadium: Championship Soccer Stadium; Attendance: 4,068; Referee: Ricardo Fierro

August 12 24	Orange County SC	2-1	Phoenix Rising FC	Irvine, California
7:00 PM	Skendi (yellow card) 9'; Iloski 20' 62'; Scott (yellow card) 88'; Okoli (yellow card) 90'	Report	Williams 23'; Lambert (yellow card) 90+2'	Stadium: Championship Soccer Stadium; Attendance: 4,105; Referee: Sergii Demianchuk

August 17 25	Orange County SC	1-1	Las Vegas Lights FC	Irvine, California
7:00 PM	Iloski 10'; Torres (yellow card) 45+1'; Scott (yellow card) 75'	Report	Jennings 52'	Stadium: Championship Soccer Stadium; Attendance: 3,679; Referee: Melvin Rivas

August 27 26	Tampa Bay Rowdies	3-1	Orange County SC	St. Petersburg, Florida
4:30 PM	Fernandes 15'; Ekra (yellow card) 21' (yellow-red card) 56'; Hoffman 43' (o.g.); Wyke (yellow card) 66'; Harris 89'; Cochran (yellow card) 89'	Report	Orozco (yellow card) 7'; Villanueva (yellow card) 55'; Iloski 57'	Stadium: Al Lang Stadium; Attendance: 6,714; Referee: Matthew Thompson

===== September =====
September 3 27	Orange County SC	1-1	Memphis 901 FC	Irvine, California
7:00 PM	Orozco (yellow card) 22'; B. Iloski 43'; M. Iloski (yellow card) 51'; Pedersen (yellow card) 57'; Rocha (yellow card) 84'	Report	Allan (yellow card) 32'; Kelly 85'	Stadium: Championship Soccer Stadium; Attendance: 3,784; Referee: Adam Kilpatrick

September 7 28	Monterey Bay FC	1-0	Orange County SC	Seaside, California
7:30 PM	Greene (yellow card) 3'; Fehr (yellow card) 17'; Murphy (yellow card) 38'; Gleadle 51'	Report	Hoffman (yellow card) 35'; Casiple (yellow card) 59'; Partida (yellow card) 67'; Scott (yellow card) 67'; Kuningas (yellow card) 84'; Villanueva (yellow card) 87'	Stadium: Cardinale Stadium; Attendance: 2,723; Referee: Brad Jensen

September 10 29	Orange County SC	1-0	LA Galaxy II	Irvine, California
7:00 PM	Scott (yellow card) 16'; Powers (yellow card) 24'; Skendi (yellow card) 26'; Hoffman (yellow card) 41'; Iloski 68' (yellow card) 71'	Report	Drack (yellow card) 39'; Judd (yellow card) 51' (yellow-red card) 74'; Harvey (red card) 75'; González (yellow card) 78'; Essengue (yellow card) 89'	Stadium: Championship Soccer Stadium

September 18 30	Sacramento Republic FC	4-0	Orange County SC	Sacramento, California
2:00 PM	Viader 7'; Foster (yellow card) 10' (goal) 28' 45'; Lopez 18' (yellow card) 69'	Report	Hoffman (yellow card) 31'; Orozco (red card) 35'; Partida (yellow card) 87'	Stadium: Heart Health Park; Attendance: 10,396; Referee: Sergii Demianchuk

September 24 31	Pittsburgh Riverhounds SC	1-1	Orange County SC	Pittsburgh, Pennsylvania
4:00 PM	Dikwa 4'; Griffin (yellow card) 57'; Williams (yellow card) 73'; Mertz (yellow card) 85'	Report	Miles (yellow card) 64'; Iloski 90'	Stadium: Highmark Stadium; Attendance: 4,639; Referee: Elton García

===== October =====
October 1 32	Orange County SC	2-2	San Diego Loyal	Irvine, California
7:00 PM	Powers (yellow card) 43'; M. Iloski 44' (yellow card) 57'; Rakovsky (yellow card) 53'; B. Iloski 90'	Report	Amang 14' (yellow card) 29'; Conway (yellow card) 41'; Blake (yellow card) 45+1' (goal) 53'; Ackon (yellow card) 90+1'	Stadium: Championship Soccer Stadium; Attendance: 5,425; Referee: Matthew Thompson

33	El Paso Locomotive FC	2-1	Orange County SC	El Paso, Texas
	Ryan (yellow card) 22'; Solignac 37'; Bahner (yellow card) 38'; Fox 54'; Hinds (yellow card) 90+3'	Report	Rocha (yellow card) 29'; Scott (yellow card) 53'; Jamison 83'	Stadium: Southwest University Park; Referee: Calin Radosav

October 15 34	San Antonio FC	2-2	Orange County SC	San Antonio, Texas
5:30 PM	Bailone 43'; Gomez (yellow card) 45+3'; Parano 46'; Khmiri (yellow card) 61'; Taintor (yellow card) 90'; Giro (yellow card) 90+3'	Report	Richards (yellow card) 12'; Miles (yellow card) 14'; Iloski 25'; Orozco 45+1'; Torres (yellow card) 45+3'; McCabe (yellow card) 90'	Stadium: Toyota Field; Attendance: 8,015; Referee: Danielle Chesky

=== U.S. Open Cup ===
As a member of the USL Championship, Orange County entered the Open Cup in the second round, matched up against the Los Angeles Force, a member of the NISA, a league in the third tier of American soccer. After winning 5–2 at home, they got thrashed in the third round away at BMO Stadium against Los Angeles FC, a member of the highest tier of American soccer, MLS.

April 5 Second Round	Orange County SC (USLC) (California)	5–2	(California) Los Angeles Force (NISA)	Irvine, California
7:30 pm PDT	Pedersen 24' Iloski 31' (yellow card) 52'; Okoli 33'; Rakovsky (yellow card) 50'; Kuningas 53' Henry 69'	Report	O'Brien (yellow card) 35'; Goñi 37'; Garcia (yellow card) 43'; Chavez (yellow card) 50'; Clayton Torr 90'	Stadium: Championship Soccer Stadium; Referee: Joseph Salinas

April 20 Third Round	Los Angeles FC (MLS) (California)	5–1	(California) Orange County SC (USLC)	Los Angeles, California
7:30 pm PDT	Musovski 13', 71'; Arango 34', 45'; Palacios (yellow card) 54'; Jennings 68'	Report	Rocha (yellow card) 45+3'; Torres 73' (yellow card) 77'	Stadium: Banc of California Stadium; Referee: Samantha Martinez

=== International friendly ===
On September 23, Orange County and German 2. Bundesliga team Hamburg SV announced an international club friendly against each other on November 15, with Orange County hosting the German visitors at the end of the USL Championship season and ahead of the international break for the 2022 FIFA World Cup. The visitors ended up winning 1–0.

November 15 International Friendly	Orange County SC (United States)	0-1	Hamburger SV (Germany)	Irvine, California
7:00 PM PDT		Report	Königsdörffer 41'	Stadium: Championship Soccer Stadium
