= 2024 Orange County SC season =

Orange County SC
2024 season
- Owner: James Keston
- Manager: Morten Karlsen (until June 25); Paul Hardyman (Interim, June 25 - July 19) (Head, July 19 - August 29); Danny Stone (Interim, from August 29)
- Stadium: Championship Soccer Stadium; Irvine, California
- USL Championship: Western Conference: 6th
- USL Championship Playoffs: Conference Semifinals
- U.S. Open Cup: Round of 32
- Top goalscorer: Ethan Zubak (11 goals)
- Highest home attendance: 5,500 (September 14, against Rhode Island FC)
- Lowest home attendance: League: 3,018 (September 25, against Phoenix Rising FC); All Competitions: 1,749 (May 7, against Loudoun United FC)
- Average home league attendance: 4,138
Home colors	Away colors	Third colors

The 2024 Orange County SC season was the club's fourteenth season of existence, and their fourteenth consecutive season in the United Soccer League Championship, the second tier of American soccer.

Orange County experienced multiple coaching changes in the middle of the season, with head coach Morten Karlsen transferring to coach in Denmark, and lead assistant coach Paul Hardyman being promoted to Head Coach, before he was fired and another assistant coach, Danny Stone, being named Interim Head Coach.

== Season summary ==
During the offseason, Orange County experienced two major changes. In the January transfer window, the 2022 and 2023 Orange County season leading goal scorer, Milan Iloski, brother of Brian Iloski, made a transfer to Danish Superliga team FC Nordsjælland. Additionally, interim head coach Morten Karlsen signed a multi-year contract with Orange County during the offseason to become the official head coach of Orange County.

In their season opener, Orange County drew 2–2 with the Sacramento Republic FC away in Sacramento, with Colin Shutler scoring a header during a corner kick three minutes into stoppage time. With his header, Shutler became the first Orange County, and only the third ever USL Championship goalkeeper, to score in a match.

Orange County had a hot start to the season, not losing their first six games. However, after losing six of the next nine games, Orange County held a 6-6-2 record in the Western Conference in late June, resulting in Head Coach Karlsen making a transfer to Danish Superliga team Lyngby BK, with head assistant coach Paul Hardyman being promoted to interim head coach, until he was eventually promoted to being the official head coach of the team on July 19.

As the season progressed, Orange County lost form, not scoring in a five-match period beginning in late July, the longest streak in franchise history. This streak of four losses and one draw culminated in the worst loss in franchise history, an August 24 match against the Charleston Battery, where the club would lose 6–0, prompting an open letter apology to fans from owner James Keston and the sacking of head coach Hardyman, who ultimately had a record of 2–1–7. He was replaced by first assistant coach Danny Stone, who formerly coached Phoenix Rising FC and OKC Energy FC, who was named interim until the end of the season.

Heading into September, Orange County SC continued its downwards spiral, despite breaking its non-scoring streak in a 2–3 loss to Las Vegas Lights FC, leaving them in 9th place and out of playoff contention. The winless streak of five losses and one draw ended in a mid-September match against Rhode Island FC in a 1–0 win, in a match where Colin Shutler became the team's all-time leader in saves.

With the momentum from their first win in five matches, Orange County ended off the season on an eight-game unbeaten streak, including an undefeated October, ending off the season with a final record of 13–14–7. Colin Shutler entered the record books again, setting a club record of twelve clean sheets in a season, surpassing former record-holder Patrick Rakovsky.

After their unbeaten run of five wins and three draws, Orange County placed sixth in the Western Conference, scheduled to play against Memphis 901 FC away on November 2 for the Western Conference Quarterfinals. After winning in added extra time due to a header from Dillon Powers in the 116th minute, Orange County was matched up against the Colorado Springs Switchbacks FC on November 10 away for the Conference Semi-Finals, where the team would ultimately lose in added extra time.

== Roster ==
As of July 20, 2024

Note: Flags indicate national team as defined under FIFA eligibility rules; some limited exceptions apply. Players may hold more than one non-FIFA nationality.

No.	Pos.	Nation	Player
1	GK	USA	Colin Shutler
2	DF	USA	Owen Lambe
3	DF	USA	Charlie Asensio
4	MF	FRA	Sofiane Djeffal
5	DF	USA	Dillon Powers
6	DF	ENG	Andrew Fox
7	FW	USA	Cameron Dunbar
8	MF	USA	Seth Casiple
9	FW	USA	Ethan Zubak
10	MF	USA	Brian Iloski
11	FW	USA	Bryce Jamison
13	DF	USA	Pedro Guimaraes
14	DF	USA	Ryan Flood (on loan from Phoenix Rising FC)
15	MF	USA	Ashish Chattha
16	MF	USA	Chris Hegardt (on loan from Stabæk Fotball)
17	FW	ESA	Christian Sorto

No.	Pos.	Nation	Player
19	MF	USA	Kevin Partida
21	FW	CMR	Thomas Amang
22	DF	USA	Joseph Buckley
23	DF	NOR	Ryan Doghman
24	FW	USA	Benjamin Barjolo
25	MF	USA	Ryan Ayoub
26	MF	USA	Kyle Scott
27	FW	USA	Marcus Lee
29	GK	USA	Juan Santana
30	DF	NOR	Markus Nakkim (Captain)
32	FW	USA	Nicolás Ruiz
33	DF	USA	Ashton Miles
34	MF	USA	Ethan Loomis
35	MF	USA	Ben Norris
39	GK	USA	Adoniayah Aemiro

1. USL Academy Contract

=== Technical staff ===
Role	Name
President of Soccer Operations & General Manager	Peter Nugent
Interim Head Coach	Danny Stone
Assistant Coach	Didier Crettenand
Goalkeeping Coach	Victor Nogueira
Performance Data Analyst	Amanda Preciado
Performance Consultant	Dan Guzman
Head Academy Scout	Shawn Beyer
Team Operations Coordinator	Mario Lemus

== Competitions ==
=== Exhibitions ===
In preparation for the 2024 USL Championship season, Orange County played in seven pre-season friendlies, mainly against collegiate and fellow USL Championship teams.

February 3 Preseason	Orange County SC	2–1	Loyola Marymount Lions	Irvine, California
11:00 AM	War 77'; Zubak 85'	Report	87'	Stadium: Great Park Field 10; Attendance: 0

February 10 Preseason	Orange County SC	0–1	UC Irvine Anteaters	Irvine, California
10:00 AM		Report	11'	Stadium: Championship Soccer Stadium; Attendance: 0

Preseason	Orange County SC	0–1	Los Angeles FC 2	Irvine, California
		Report	87'	Stadium: Championship Soccer Stadium; Attendance: 0

February 21 Preseason	Orange County SC	0–0	Vancouver Whitecaps FC	Coachella Valley, California
1:00 PM		Report

February 24 Preseason	Phoenix Rising FC	v	Orange County SC
1:00 PM
Note: Results not posted

March 2 Preseason	Orange County SC	v	Las Vegas Lights FC	Irvine, California
1:00 PM				Stadium: Championship Soccer Stadium
Note: Results not posted

March 2 Preseason	Orange County SC	v	San Diego Toreros	Irvine, California
4:30 PM				Stadium: Championship Soccer Stadium
Note: Results not posted

=== USL Championship ===
==== Standings ====
Pos	Team	Pld	W	L	T	GF	GA	GD	Pts	Qualification
4	Las Vegas Lights FC	34	13	10	11	49	46	+3	50	Playoffs
5	Sacramento Republic FC	34	13	11	10	46	34	+12	49	Playoffs
6	Orange County SC	34	13	14	7	38	45	−7	46	Playoffs
7	Oakland Roots SC	34	13	16	5	37	57	−20	44	Playoffs
8	Phoenix Rising FC	34	11	14	9	33	39	−6	42	Playoffs

Source: USL Championship Standings
Rules for classification: 1) head-to-head points; 2) head-to-head goal differential; 3) points-per game within conference; 4) total wins; 5) total goal differential; 6) total goals scored; 7) points earned against top four Conference finishers; 8) disciplinary points; 9) coin toss or drawing of lots

==== Match results ====
On December 18, 2023, the USL Championship released the regular season schedule for all 24 teams.

All times are in Pacific Standard Time.

March 9 1	Sacramento Republic FC	2–2	Orange County SC	Sacramento, California
7:00 PM	Amann 28', 77', (yellow card) 79'; Jauregui (yellow card) 40'; Mazzola (yellow card) 51'; Ricketts (yellow card) 90+3'	Report	Partida (yellow card) 35'; Casiple 42'; Djeffal (yellow card) 45+2'; Shutler (yellow card) 90+3', (goal) 90+6'	Stadium: Heart Health Park; Attendance: 11,569; Referee: Alexis Da Silva
Note: Colin Shutler's header was the first goal by a goalkeeper in Orange County SC's history.

March 16 2	Pittsburgh Riverhounds	0–2	Orange County SC	Pittsburgh, Pennsylvania
4:00 PM	Hogan (yellow card) 71'; Biasi (yellow card) 81'	Report	Iloski 3'; Miles (yellow card) 24'; Doghman (yellow card) 60'; Amang (yellow card) 64'; Dunbar 76'; Shutler (yellow card) 84'	Stadium: Highmark Stadium; Attendance: 5,125; Referee: Matthew Thompson

March 23 3	Orange County SC	2–2	Miami FC	Irvine, California
7:00 PM	Partida (yellow card) 29'; Miles 33'; Amang 70'	Report	Mitrano (yellow card) 8'; Gavilanes 12', 45+4'; Genzano (yellow card) 58'; Botta (yellow card) 60'; Biek (yellow card) 90+7'	Stadium: Championship Soccer Stadium; Attendance: 5,000; Referee: Jeremy Scheer

March 30 4	Orange County SC	1–0	FC Tulsa	Irvine, California
7:00 PM	Djeffal 27'; Chattha (yellow card) 40'; Lambe (yellow card) 56'; Iloski (yellow card) 68'	Report	Portillo (yellow card) 31'; Diallo (yellow card) 36'; Ponce (yellow card) 45+4'; Seagrist (yellow card) 49'	Stadium: Championship Soccer Stadium; Attendance: 3,573; Referee: Trevor Wiseman

April 6 5	Memphis 901 FC	0–2	Orange County SC	Memphis, Tennessee
1:00 PM	Lopes (yellow card) 43'	Report	Iloski 61'; Amang 63'; Djeffal (yellow card) 76'; Partida (yellow card) 86'; Fox (yellow card) 90+4'	Stadium: AutoZone Park; Attendance: 2,316; Referee: Thomas Snyder

April 13 6	San Antonio FC	0–0	Orange County SC	San Antonio, Texas
5:30 PM	Taintor (yellow card) 25'; Haakenson (yellow card) 68'	Report	Sorto (yellow card) 19'; Miles (yellow card) 79'; Amang (yellow card) 82'; Partida (yellow card) 89'	Stadium: Toyota Field; Attendance: 6,957; Referee: Natalie Simon

April 20 7	Orange County SC	0–2	Sacramento Republic FC	Irvine, California
7:00 PM	Dunbar (yellow card) 29'; Amang (yellow card) 34'; Scott (yellow card) 70'	Report	Amann 1'; Fernandes (yellow card) 22'; Sanchez 25'; Desmond (yellow card) 30'; Cicerone (yellow card) 52'; Timmer (yellow card) 58'; Ross (yellow card) 90+4'	Stadium: Championship Soccer Stadium; Attendance: 4,200; Referee: Abdou Ndiaye

April 27 8	Orange County SC	2–0	Monterey Bay FC	Irvine, California
7:00 PM	Amang 6'; Scott (yellow card) 21'; Sorto (yellow card) 24'; Djeffal (yellow card) 52'; Shutler (yellow card) 65'; Zubak 82'	Report	Lara (yellow card) 25'; Rebollar (yellow card) 54'	Stadium: Championship Soccer Stadium; Attendance: 4,588; Referee: Deshun Beard

May 11 9	Louisville City FC	3–0	Orange County SC	Louisville, Kentucky
4:30 PM	Harris 19'; Morris (yellow card) 32'; Serrano 68'; Wilson (yellow card) 86'	Report	Iloski (yellow card) 23'; Scott (yellow card) 42'; Colin Shutler (yellow card) 68'	Stadium: Lynn Family Stadium; Attendance: 10,239

May 18 10	Oakland Roots SC	2–1	Orange County SC	Hayward, California
7:00 PM	Reid 31' (pen.), (yellow card) 43'; Margvelashvili 90+4'	Report	Amang 21'; Scott (yellow card) 55'; Zubak (yellow card) 67'; Lee (yellow card) 88'	Stadium: Pioneer Stadium; Attendance: 3,651; Referee: Servando Berna Rico

May 25 11	Orange County SC	0–2	Loudoun United FC	Irvine, California
7:00 PM	Chattha (yellow card) 41'; Scott (yellow card) 88'; Miles (red card) 90+5'	Report	Valot 34'; Erlandson (yellow card) 51'; Skundrich (yellow card) 72'; Ryan 90+6' (pen.)	Stadium: Championship Soccer Stadium; Attendance: 4,342; Referee: Natalie Simon

June 1 12	Orange County SC	3–2	Detroit City FC	Irvine California
7:00 PM	Amang 40', (yellow card) 90+5'; Scott (yellow card) 56', (goal) 57'; Fox (yellow card) 65'; Jamison (yellow card) 78'	Report	Carroll (yellow card) 8', (goal) 19'; Amoo-Mensah (yellow card) 14'; Diop 67' (pen.); Rutz (yellow card) 90+3'	Stadium: Championship Soccer Stadium; Attendance: 3,537; Referee: Nabil Bensalah

June 8 13	Phoenix Rising FC	2–1	Orange County SC	Phoenix, Arizona
8:00 PM	Formella 6', 87'; Hernández (yellow card) 22'; Fuenmayor (yellow card) 51'; Rito (yellow card) 83' (yellow-red card) 84'	Report	Miles (yellow card) 45+1'; Zubak (yellow card) 57'; Lambe (yellow card) 59'; Chattha (yellow card) 79'	Stadium: Phoenix Rising Soccer Stadium; Attendance: 5,032; Referee: Ricardo Montero

June 15 14	Colorado Springs Switchbacks FC	4–2	Orange County SC	Colorado Springs, Colorado
6:00 PM	Hanya 19', 82'; Williams (yellow card) 52'; Foster 63', 86'; Damus (yellow card) 89'	Report	Flood (yellow card) 42'; Jamison 48', 61'; Doghman (yellow card) 80'; Shutler (yellow card) 82'	Stadium: Weidner Field; Attendance: 8,023; Referee: Brad Jensen

June 22 15	Indy Eleven	0–1	Orange County SC	Indianapolis, Indiana
4:00 PM	Ofeimu (yellow card) 40+8'; Williams (yellow card) 52'	Report	Zubak 25', (yellow card) 42'; Sorto (yellow card) 35'; Chattha (yellow card) 73'	Stadium: Michael A. Carroll Stadium; Attendance: 9,490; Referee: Joe Surgan

June 29 16	Orange County SC	0–2	Oakland Roots SC	Irvine, California
7:00 PM	Chattha (yellow card) 32'; Shutler (yellow card) 34'; Scott (yellow card) 74'; Amang (yellow card) 87'	Report	Riley 15'; Njie (yellow card) 23'; Rodriguez 79'; Dwyer (yellow card) 90'	Stadium: Championship Soccer Stadium; Attendance: 5,000; Referee: Elton García

July 3 17	New Mexico United	2–0	Orange County SC	Albuquerque, New Mexico
6:00 PM	Miles 50' (o.g.); Mohamed 73'; Bruce (yellow card) 76'	Report	Chattha (yellow card) 15'; Miles (yellow card) 71'; Chavez (yellow card) 72'; Jamison (yellow card) 83'	Stadium: Isotopes Park; Attendance: 12,147; Referee: Thomas Snyder

July 6 18	Orange County SC	4–1	Memphis 901 FC	Irvine, California
7:00 PM	Jamison 5'; Zubak 25' (pen.) (yellow card) 49'; Lambe 43'; Chattha (yellow card) 56'; Miles (yellow card) 61'; Sorto 79'	Report	Hyndman (yellow card) 59'; Ward (yellow card) 66'; Vom Steeg (yellow card) 77'; Borczak 89'; Pickering (yellow card) 90+1'; Yacoubou (yellow card) 90'3'	Stadium: Championship Soccer Stadium; Attendance: 3,725; Referee: John Griggs

July 13 19	Tampa Bay Rowdies	2–0	Orange County SC	St. Petersburg, Florida
4:30 PM	Jennings 6' 30'; Crisostomo (yellow card) 67'; Kleemann (yellow card) 83'	Report	Norris (yellow card) 43' (yellow-red card) 52'	Stadium: Al Lang Stadium; Attendance: 5,971; Referee: Eric Tattersall

July 20 20	Orange County SC	2–0	San Antonio FC	Irvine, California
7:00 PM	Scott (yellow card) 29'; Nakkim 62'; Gomez (yellow card) 66'; Lambe 88'	Report	Hernandez (yellow card) 44'; Buckmaster (yellow card) 52'	Stadium: Championship Soccer Stadium; Attendance: 4,258; Referee: Trevor Wiseman

July 27 21	Birmingham Legion FC	3–0	Orange County SC	Birmingham, Alabama
4:30 PM	Pinho 51', 89'; Martínez (yellow card) 85'; Pasher 90+5'	Report	Flood (yellow card) 3'; Nakkim (yellow card) 10'; Scott (yellow card) 10'; Lambe (yellow card) 86'	Stadium: Protective Stadium; Attendance: 4,023; Referee: Matthew Thompson

August 3 22	Orange County SC	0–1	North Carolina FC	Irvine, California
7:00 PM	Sorto (yellow card) 84'	Report	Batista (yellow card) 21'; Malou 27'; Servania (yellow card) 90+5'	Stadium: Championship Soccer Stadium; Attendance: 3,353; Referee: Benjamin Meyer

August 9 23	FC Tulsa	0–0	Orange County SC	Tulsa, Oklahoma
5:30 PM	Laszo (yellow card) 85'; Damm (yellow card) 90+1'; Bourgeois (yellow card) 90+4'	Report	Norris (yellow card) 66'	Stadium: ONEOK Field; Attendance: 4,411; Referee: Calin Radosav

August 17 24	Orange County SC	0–1	El Paso Locomotive FC	Irvine, California
7:00 PM	Norris (yellow card) 33'; Hegardt (yellow card) 54'; Jamison (yellow card) 69'; Scott (yellow card) 71'	Report	Calvillo 64' (pen.); Lyons (yellow card) 80'; Moreno (yellow card) 89'	Stadium: Championship Soccer Stadium; Attendance: 4,001; Referee: Abdou Ndiaye

August 24 25	Charleston Battery	6–0	Orange County SC	Mount Pleasant, South Carolina
4:30 PM	Markanich 7' (pen.) 48', 75'; Rodríguez 39'; Segbers (red card) 62'; Myers 72', 89'	Report	Doghman (red card) 5'; Casiple (yellow card) 77'	Stadium: Patriots Point Soccer Complex; Attendance: 4,302; Referee: Matthew Corrigan

August 31 26	Orange County SC	2–3	Las Vegas Lights FC	Irvine, California
7:00 PM	Scott (yellow card) 6'; Zubak 11', 19'; Powers (yellow card) 37'; Norris (yellow card) 77'	Report	Bennett 39' (pen.) 63'; Shutler 87' (o.g.); Gyau (yellow card) 90+3'	Stadium: Championship Soccer Stadium; Attendance: 3,579; Referee: Ekaterina Koroleva

September 14 27	Orange County SC	1-0	Rhode Island FC	Irvine, California
7:00 PM	Jamison 31'; Powers (yellow card) 44'; Zubak (yellow card) 80'	Report	Turnbull (yellow card) 88'	Stadium: Championship Soccer Stadium; Attendance: 5,500; Referee: Trevor Wiseman

September 21 28	Monterey Bay FC	0-0	Orange County SC	Seaside, California
7:00 PM		Report	Partida (yellow card) 67'	Stadium: Cardinale Stadium; Attendance: 3,912; Referee: Elton García

September 25 29	Orange County SC	2-0	Phoenix Rising FC	Irvine, California
7:00 PM	Zubak 7', 39'; Hegardt (yellow card) 36'; Partida (yellow card) 65'	Report	Hernández (yellow card) 2'; Margaritha (yellow card) 36'; Wyke (yellow card) 45+5'; Torres (yellow card) 45+5'; Dennis (yellow card) 66'; Boye (yellow card) 88'	Stadium: Championship Soccer Stadium; Attendance: 3,018; Referee: John Griggs

October 5 30	Las Vegas Lights FC	1-1	Orange County SC	Las Vegas, Nevada
7:30 PM	Bennett 26'	Report	Hegardt 16'; Chattha (yellow card) 35'; Partida (yellow card) 37'; Nakkim (yellow card) 71'	Stadium: Cashman Field; Attendance: 1,828; Referee: Gerald Flores

October 9 31	Orange County SC	2-0	Colorado Springs Switchbacks FC	Irvine, California
7:00 PM	Partida (yellow card) 27'; Williams 32' (o.g.); Zubak 90+5'	Report	Dhillon (yellow card) 19' (yellow-red card) 44'; Rocha (yellow card) 30'; Tejada (yellow card) 47'; Pierre (yellow card) 78'; Santos (yellow card) 84'	Stadium: Championship Soccer Stadium; Attendance: 4,130; Referee: Muhammad Hassan

October 16 32	El Paso Locomotive FC	0-2	Orange County SC	El Paso, Texas
6:00 PM	Escoto (yellow card) 48'; Ackwei (red card) 82'	Report	Zubak 16'; Chattha (yellow card) 44'; Dunbar 69'; Partida (yellow card) 78'	Stadium: Southwest University Park; Attendance: 6,004; Referee: Brandon Stevis

October 19 33	Orange County SC	0-0	New Mexico United	Irvine, California
7:00 PM	Zubak (yellow card) 90+2'	Report	Seymore (yellow card) 17'; Ryden (yellow card) 42'; Dubois (yellow card) 69'; Hurst (yellow card) 76'; Landry (yellow card) 90+6'	Stadium: Championship Soccer Stadium; Attendance: 4,675; Referee: Ricardo Montero

October 26 34	Orange County SC	3-2	Hartford Athletic	Irvine, California
7:00 PM	Hegardt (yellow card) 40'; Doghman 53', 58'; Miles (yellow card) 73'; Amang 86'	Report	Vancaeyezeele (yellow card) 9'; Ngalina (yellow card) 17'; Epps 55' (yellow card) 73'; Edwards 83'	Stadium: Championship Soccer Stadium; Attendance: 4,729; Referee: Sergii Demianchuk

==== Playoffs ====
Following the conclusion of the 2024 USL Championship season, the USL officially released the bracket for the 2024 playoffs.

November 2 Conference Quarterfinals	Memphis 901 FC	0-1 (a.e.t.)	Orange County SC	Memphis, Tennessee
11:00 AM	Ward (yellow card) 5'; Paul (yellow card) 64'; Turci (yellow card) 68' (red card) 79'; Lapa (yellow card) 82'	Report	Lambe (yellow card) 52'; Casiple (yellow card) 58'; Nakkim (yellow card) 82'; Norris (yellow card) 112'; Powers 116'	Stadium: AutoZone Park; Attendance: 3,014; Referee: Ricardo Fierro

November 10 Conference Semifinals	Colorado Springs Switchbacks	2–1 (a.e.t.)	Orange County SC	Colorado Springs, Colorado
3:30 PM	Zandi 10', 105+1' (yellow card) 69'	Report	Zubak 4'; Casiple (yellow card) 85'; Powers (yellow card) 108'	Stadium: Weidner Field; Attendance: 7,236; Referee: Lorenzo Hernandez

=== U.S. Open Cup ===
As a member of the USL Championship, Orange County entered the U.S. Open Cup in the Round of 32. It was announced by the U.S. Soccer Federation on April 18, 2024, that Orange County would face off against fellow USL Championship team Loudoun United FC at home.

May 7 Round of 32	Orange County SC	1–2	Loudoun United FC	Irvine, California
7:00 PM	Nakkim (yellow card) 11'; Scott (yellow card) 51'; Chattha (yellow card) 60'; Amang 62'	Report	Leggett 22', 64'; Martinez (yellow card) 26'; Turner (yellow card) 37'; Hughes (yellow card) 59'	Stadium: Championship Soccer Stadium; Attendance: 1,749; Referee: Omeed Azadpour
