= 2024 Memphis 901 FC season =

Memphis 901 FC
2024 season
- Owners: Peter B. Freund; Craig Unger
- Head coach: Stephen Glass
- Stadium: AutoZone Park; Memphis, Tennessee
- USLC: Western Conference: 3rd
- USLC Playoffs: Conference Quarterfinals
- U.S. Open Cup: Round of 32
- Top goalscorer: Bruno Lapa (11 goals)
- Highest home attendance: 4,688 (October 12, against Sacramento Republic FC)
- Lowest home attendance: 2,188 (June 12, against Rhode Island FC)
- Average home league attendance: 2,951
Home colours	Away colours

The 2024 Memphis 901 FC season was the sixth, and final season for Memphis 901 FC in the USL Championship, the second-tier professional soccer league in the United States soccer system.

Following the season's end, the club would fold, citing a failure to secure funding for a soccer-specific stadium. Their USL Championship franchise rights were transferred to an unrelated club, Santa Barbara Sky FC, a club which was supposed to originally play in the USL League One.

== Players and staff ==
=== Players ===
As of July 21, 2024

Note: Flags indicate national team as defined under FIFA eligibility rules; some limited exceptions apply. Players may hold more than one non-FIFA nationality.

No.	Pos.	Nation	Player
1	GK	USA	Tyler Deric
2	DF	TOG	Walid Yacoubou
3	DF	USA	Carson Vom Steeg
4	MF	USA	Emerson Hyndman
5	MF	ARG	Samuel Careaga
6	MF	AUS	Zach Duncan
7	FW	USA	Noe Meza
8	DF	BRA	Lucas Turci
9	MF	BRA	Luiz Fernando
10	MF	BRA	Bruno Lapa
11	FW	BRA	Marlon

No.	Pos.	Nation	Player
14	DF	USA	Akeem Ward
15	FW	JAM	Neco Brett
18	MF	USA	Alvaro Quezada
19	DF	USA	Oscar Jimenez
20	FW	USA	Nighte Pickering
23	MF	TTO	Leston Paul
26	GK	USA	Aren Seeger
47	GK	USA	Taylor Bailey
77	FW	USA	Dylan Borczak
91	DF	FRA	Abdoulaye Cissoko

=== Technical staff ===
As of July 21, 2024

Technical staff
Sporting Director	Caleb Patterson-Sewell
Head Coach	Stephen Glass
Team Administrator/Equipment Manager	Thomas Campbell
Head of Sports Science	Leandro Spinola
Head Athletic Trainer	Langston Smith
Sports Performance and Wellness	Drew Graham

== Competitions ==
=== USL Championship ===
==== Western Conference standings ====
Pos	Team	Pld	W	L	T	GF	GA	GD	Pts	Qualification
1	New Mexico United	34	18	11	5	46	44	+2	59	Playoffs
2	Colorado Springs Switchbacks FC (C)	34	15	12	7	48	40	+8	52	Playoffs
3	Memphis 901 FC	34	14	11	9	52	41	+11	51	Playoffs
4	Las Vegas Lights FC	34	13	10	11	49	46	+3	50	Playoffs
5	Sacramento Republic FC	34	13	11	10	46	34	+12	49	Playoffs

Source: USL Championship Standings
Rules for classification: 1) head-to-head points; 2) head-to-head goal differential; 3) points-per game within conference; 4) total wins; 5) total goal differential; 6) total goals scored; 7) points earned against top four Conference finishers; 8) disciplinary points; 9) coin toss or drawing of lots
(C) Champions

==== Match results ====
On December 18, 2023, the USL Championship released the regular season schedule for all 24 teams.

Win Draw Loss Upcoming fixture

Unless otherwise noted, all times in Central time

===== March =====
March 9 1	Memphis 901 FC	2–1	Las Vegas Lights FC	Memphis, Tennessee
3:00 PM	Careaga 33'; Pickering 44'; Duncan (yellow card) 46'; Ward (yellow card) 80'	Report	Noël 22'; Azcona (yellow card) 40'	Stadium: AutoZone Park; Attendance: 3,290; Referee: Joshua Encarnación

March 16 2	Memphis 901 FC	1–2	Indy Eleven	Memphis, TN
3:00 PM	Jiminez (yellow card) 15' (yellow-red card) 45'; Yacoubou (yellow card) 25'; Cissoko 91'; Deric (yellow card) 94'; Ward (yellow card) 97' (yellow-red card) 97'	Report	Chapman-Page (yellow card) 8'; Blake 26'; Barbir (yellow card) 35'; Martínez 42', (yellow card) 57'; O'Brien (yellow card) 93'	Stadium: Autozone Park; Attendance: 2,621; Referee: Sergii Demianchuk

March 30 3	Sacramento Republic FC	1–0	Memphis 901 FC	Sacramento, California
9:00 PM	Fernandes (yellow card) 45+2'; López (yellow card) 52'; Donovan (yellow card) 64'; Ricketts 87'	Report	Duncan (yellow card) 13'; Turci (yellow card) 16'; Pickering (yellow card) 54'; Vom Steeg (yellow card) 65'; Yellow (yellow card) 72'; Careaga (yellow card) 73'; Meza (yellow card) 90'	Stadium: Heart Health Park; Attendance: 9,488; Referee: Elijio Arreguin

===== April =====
April 6 4	Memphis 901 FC	0–2	Orange County SC	Memphis, Tennessee
3:00 PM	Lopes (yellow card) 43'	Report	Iloski 61'; Amang 63'; Djeffal (yellow card) 76'; Partida (yellow card) 86'; Fox (yellow card) 90+4'	Stadium: AutoZone Park; Attendance: 2,316; Referee: Thomas Snyder

April 13 5	Loudoun United FC	2–1	Memphis 901 FC	Leesburg, Virginia
3:00 PM	Ryan 42'; Skundrich 69'; Williamson (yellow card) 90+6'; Leggett (yellow card) 90+7'	Report	Careaga 14'; Marlon (yellow card) 25'; Duncan (yellow card) 44'; Paul (yellow card) 75'; Hyndman (yellow card) 90+9'	Stadium: Segra Field; Attendance: 2,820; Referee: Matthew Corrigan

April 20 6	Memphis 901 FC	1–2	Monterey Bay FC	Memphis, Tennessee
7:00 PM	Lara 1' (o.g.); Jimenez (yellow card) 36'; Duncan (yellow card) 49'; Quezada (yellow card) 72'	Report	Trager 68' (pen.); Lara 70'	Stadium: AutoZone Park; Attendance: 2,598; Referee: Muhammad Hassan

April 27 7	Birmingham Legion FC	0–3	Memphis 901 FC	Birmingham, Alabama
6:30 PM	Kavita (yellow card) 72'; Hernandez-Foster (yellow card) 90+4'	Report	Lapa 4', 54'; Turci 17'; Fernando (yellow card) 45+3'; Ward (yellow card) 81'	Stadium: Protective Stadium; Attendance: 2,541; Referee: Alejo Calume

===== May =====
May 4 8	Memphis 901 FC	4–1	Tampa Bay Rowdies	Memphis, Tennessee
3:00 PM	Marlon 19', 50'; Fernando 23'; Borczak 64'; Careaga (yellow card) 75'; Pickering (yellow card) 81'; Ward (yellow card) 90+2'	Report	Lasso (red card) 11'; Guillen (yellow card) 24'; Arteaga (yellow card) 29' (goal) 45+6'; Niyongabire (yellow card) 54'	Stadium: AutoZone Park; Attendance: 2,384; Referee: Alexis Da Silva

May 8 -	Miami FC	P–P	Memphis 901 FC	Miami, Florida
6:00 PM		Report		Stadium: FIU Soccer Stadium
Note: Postponed to August 14 to accommodate U.S. Open Cup scheduling conflict

May 11 9	Monterey Bay FC	2–2	Memphis 901 FC	Seaside, California
9:00 PM	Fehr 35'; Trager 90'	Report	Lapa 70'; Cissoko (yellow card) 82' Lopes 88' (yellow card) 89'	Stadium: Cardinale Stadium; Attendance: 3,580; Referee: Kyle Johnston

May 17 10	El Paso Locomotive FC	1–2	Memphis 901 FC	El Paso, Texas
8:00 PM	Ward 24' (o.g.); Lyons (yellow card) 32'; Stauffer (yellow card) 47'; Rose (yellow card) 50'; Dhillon (yellow card) 56'; Alfaro (yellow card) 58'; Hinds (yellow card) 72'	Report	Marlon 29'; Turci (yellow card) 51'; Deric (yellow card) 64'; Cissoko (yellow card) 71'; Lapa 90+4'	Stadium: Southwest University Park; Attendance: 6,004; Referee: Abdou Ndiaye

May 25 11	Memphis 901 FC	2–0	Pittsburgh Riverhounds SC	Memphis, TN
7:30 PM	Marlon 7'; Cissoko (yellow card) 13'; Jimenez (yellow card) 30' (goal) 47'; Quezada (yellow card) 90+3'	Report	Biasi (yellow card) 61'	Stadium: AutoZone Park; Attendance: 3,020; Referee: Velimir Stefanovic

===== June =====
June 1 12	San Antonio FC	1–0	Memphis 901 FC	San Antonio, Texas
8:00 PM	Haakenson (yellow card) 16'; Agudelo 26'; Bura (yellow card) 40'; Hernández (yellow card) 56'; Gomez (yellow card) 61'; Lambert (yellow card) 90+6'	Report	Marlon (yellow card) 16'; Careaga (yellow card) 71'; Luiz Fernando (yellow card) 72'; DePuy (red card) 81'	Stadium: Toyota Field; Attendance: 6,094; Referee: Ricardo Montero

June 8 13	Memphis 901 FC	1–1	Colorado Springs Switchbacks FC	Memphis, Tennessee
7:30 P.M.	Fernando 38'; Turci (yellow card) 45+2'; Ward (yellow card) 53'; Duncan (yellow card) 67'	Report	Ackwei 5'; Tejada (yellow card) 34'; Mahoney (yellow card) 66'; Pierre (yellow card) 73'; Santos (yellow card) 90+4'	Stadium: AutoZone Park; Attendance: 3,090; Referee: Eric Tattersall

June 12 14	Memphis 901 FC	2–2	Rhode Island FC	Memphis, Tennessee
7:00 PM	Lapa (yellow card) 44'; Careaga (yellow card) 75' (goal) 90'; Ward (yellow card) 90+2'; Marlon 90+11' (pen.)	Report	McGlynn 18' (red card) 90+15'; Doyle (yellow card) 32'; Brito 67'; Alves (yellow card) 75'; Vegas (red card) 87'; Holstad (yellow card) 90+5'	Stadium: AutoZone Park; Attendance: 2,188; Referee: Matthew Corrigan

June 15 15	Memphis 901 FC	2–1	New Mexico United	Memphis, Tennessee
7:30 PM	Lapa 13' (pen.); Turci 34'; Careaga (yellow card) 42'; Paul (yellow card) 53'; Yellow (yellow card) 62'	Report	Landry (yellow card) 14'; Akale (yellow card) 41'; Rivas (yellow card) 85'; Hurst 87'	Stadium: AutoZone Park; Attendance: 3,196; Referee: Elton García

June 22 16	Las Vegas Lights FC	1–1	Memphis 901 FC	Las Vegas, Nevada
9:30 PM	Adams (yellow card) 54'; Howell (yellow card) 74'; Bennett 80' (pen.); Azcona (yellow card) 83'; Bennett (yellow card) 90'	Report	Lapa 43' (yellow card) 90+3'; Hyndman (yellow card) 62'; Paul (yellow card) 63'; Fernando (yellow card) 69'; Careaga (yellow card) 72'	Stadium: Cashman Field; Attendance: 1,657; Referee: Trevor Wiseman

June 28 17	Memphis 901 FC	5–1	Phoenix Rising FC	Memphis, Tennessee
6:30 PM	Duncan 11'; Marlon 27'; Vom Steeg 55'; Hyndman 58'; Pickering 81'	Report	Rito (yellow card) 32'; Formella 65'; Gallardo (yellow card) 73'	Stadium: AutoZone Park; Attendance: 2,775; Referee: Jeremy Scheer

===== July =====
July 6 18	Orange County SC	4–1	Memphis 901 FC	Irvine, California
9:00 PM	Jamison 5'; Zubak 25' (pen.) (yellow card) 49'; Lambe 43'; Chattha (yellow card) 56'; Miles (yellow card) 61'; Sorto 79'	Report	Hyndman (yellow card) 59'; Ward (yellow card) 66'; Vom Steeg (yellow card) 77'; Borczak 89'; Pickering (yellow card) 90+1'; Yacoubou (yellow card) 90'3'	Stadium: Championship Soccer Stadium; Attendance: 3,725; Referee: John Griggs

July 13 19	Detroit City FC	0–1	Memphis 901 FC	Hamtramck, Michigan
6:00 PM	Murphy (yellow card) 62'	Report	Luiz Fernando (yellow card) 17'; Cissoko (yellow card) 20'; Borczak (yellow card) 45+2'; Turci (yellow card) 67'; Lapa 86'; Marlon (yellow card) 90'	Stadium: Keyworth Stadium; Attendance: 6,122; Referee: Ricardo Fierro

July 20 20	FC Tulsa	1–0	Memphis 901 FC	Tulsa, Oklahoma
7:30 PM	Goodrum 41'; Bourgeois (yellow card) 45+2'; Laszo (yellow card) 73'; Ferri (yellow card) 90+7'	Report	Pickering (yellow card) 38'; Lopes (yellow card) 40' (yellow-red card) 88'; Duncan (yellow card) 57'; Cissoko (red card) 90+5'; Turci (yellow card) 90+10'; Hyndman (yellow card) 90+12'	Stadium: ONEOK Field; Attendance: 3,950; Referee: Alyssa Nichols

July 27 21	Memphis 901 FC	1–0	San Antonio FC	Memphis, Tennessee
7:30 PM	Careaga 31'; Pickering (yellow card) 39'; Duncan (yellow card) 43'	Report	Agudelo (yellow card) 37'; Haakenson (yellow card) 45+2'; Taintor (yellow card) 68'; Lambert (yellow card) 88'	Stadium: AutoZone Park; Attendance: 3,594; Referee: Abdou Ndiaye

===== August =====
August 3 22	Memphis 901 FC	0–0	El Paso Locomotive FC	Memphis, Tennessee
7:30 PM	Turci (yellow card) 57'; Ward (yellow card) 61'; Lopes (yellow card) 67'; Fernando (yellow card) 90+5'	Report	Stauffer (yellow card) 15'; Moreno (yellow card) 73'; Coronado (yellow card) 89'	Stadium: AutoZone Park; Attendance: 2,714; Referee: Thomas Snyder

August 10 23	Charleston Battery	3–1	Memphis 901 FC	Mount Pleasant, South Carolina
	Markanich (yellow card) 30' (goal) 41'; Myers 55'; Ycaza (yellow card) 64'; Torres 72'	Report	Turci (yellow card) 26' (yellow-red card) 37'; Careaga 50'	Stadium: Patriots Point Soccer Complex; Attendance: 2,579; Referee: Nabil Bensalah

August 14 24	Miami FC	1–5	Memphis 901 FC	Miami, Florida
	López 5'; Pedro (yellow card) 74'	Report	Borczak 15'; Armenakas (yellow card) 60'; Cardona 81' (o.g.); Pickering 85'; Careaga 90+2'; Quezada 90+4'	Stadium: FIU Stadium; Attendance: 563; Referee: Jeremy Scheer
Note: Rescheduled match that was to be played on May 8

August 17 25	Memphis 901 FC	2–0	FC Tulsa	Memphis, Tennessee
7:30 PM	Lapa 35' (pen.); Careaga 68'	Report		Stadium: AutoZone Park; Attendance: 2,868; Referee: Eric Tattersall

August 24 26	Oakland Roots SC	1–1	Memphis 901 FC	Hayward, California
9:00 PM	Nije (yellow card) 20' (goal) 61'; Diaz (yellow card) 43'; Chéry (yellow card) 45+1'; Margvelashvili (yellow card) 51'; Rodriguez (yellow card) 90+3'; Riley (yellow card) 90+5'	Report	Turci (yellow card) 8'; Armenakas 32'; Meza (yellow card) 62'; Cissoko (yellow card) 65'; Deric (yellow card) 90+1'	Stadium: Pioneer Stadium; Attendance: 3,041; Referee: Lorenzo Hernandez

August 28 27	Colorado Springs Switchbacks FC	3–1	Memphis 901 FC	Colorado Springs, Colorado
8:00 PM	Fjellberg 4', 6'; Hanya (yellow card) 30'; Real (yellow card) 71'; Damus 75' (pen.)	Report	Lapa (yellow card) 13'; Mahoney 31' (o.g.); Careaga (yellow card) 37' (yellow-red card) 40'; Ward (yellow card) 40'; Marlon (red card) 77'; Paul (yellow card) 86'	Stadium: Weidner Field; Attendance: 7,481; Referee: Trevor Wiseman

===== September =====
September 11 28	Memphis 901 FC	0–0	Hartford Athletic	Memphis, Tennessee
7:00 PM	Cissoko (yellow card) 64'	Report	Asiedu (yellow card) 72' (yellow-red card) 90'	Stadium: AutoZone Park; Attendance: 3,013; Referee: Elvis Osmanovic

September 14 29	Memphis 901 FC	3–0	North Carolina FC	Memphis, Tennessee
7:00 PM	Lopes 10', 22'; Fernando 70'; Cissoko (yellow card) 77'	Report	Malou (red card) 3'; Martin (yellow card) 64'; Anderson (yellow card) 71'	Stadium: AutoZone Park; Attendance: 2,610; Referee: Calin Radosav

September 28 30	Louisville City FC	4–2	Memphis 901 FC	Louisville, Kentucky
6:30 PM	Harris 25'; Davila 40', 55'; Wynder 45+6'; Adams (yellow card) 60'; Gleadle (yellow card) 79'	Report	Lapa 14', 18'; Fernando (yellow card) 53'; Jimenez (yellow card) 80'; Turci (yellow card) 81'; Cissoko (yellow card) 90+2'	Stadium: Lynn Family Stadium; Attendance: 6,197; Referee: Nabil Bensalah

===== October =====
October 5 31	Memphis 901 FC	1–1	Oakland Roots SC	Memphis, Tennessee
	Lapa 4'; Hyndman (yellow card) 42'; Quezada (yellow card) 63'; Turci (yellow card) 67'	Report	Baca (yellow card) 32'; Riley 36'; Njie (yellow card) 45+4'; Dwyer (yellow card) 90+5'	Stadium: AutoZone Park; Attendance: 3,195; Referee: Joshua Encarnación

October 12 32	Memphis 901 FC	0–0	Sacramento Republic FC	Memphis, Tennessee
7:00 PM	Cissoko (yellow card) 6'; Duncan (yellow card) 11'; Jimenez (yellow card) 24'; Lapa (yellow card) 26'; Marlon (yellow card) 68'; Yacoubou (yellow card) 72'	Report	Neville (yellow card) 30'; Viader (yellow card) 39'	Stadium: AutoZone Park; Attendance: 4,688; Referee: Lorenzo Hernandez

October 19 33	Phoenix Rising FC	0–1	Memphis 901 FC	Phoenix, Arizona
7:30 PM	Boye (yellow card) 10'; Dennis (yellow card) 23'; Johnson (yellow card) 40'; Formella (yellow card) 55'; Cuello (yellow card) 57'	Report	Duncan (yellow card) 35'; Borczak 44'; Lapa (yellow card) 75'	Stadium: Phoenix Rising Soccer Stadium; Attendance: 8,620; Referee: Alyssa Nichols

October 26 34	New Mexico United	2–3	Memphis 901 FC	Albuquerque, New Mexico
9:00 PM	Hurst 20'; Ryden (yellow card) 60'; Vargas 90+4'	Report	Bakero 2'; Yacoubou (yellow card) 17'; Careaga 25'; Turci 63'; Cissoko (yellow card) 90+9'	Stadium: Isotopes Park; Attendance: 10,220; Referee: Eric Tattersall

==== USL Cup ====
November 2, 2024 Conference Quarterfinals	Memphis 901 FC	0–1 (a.e.t.)	Orange County SC	Memphis, Tennessee
1:00 PM CDT	Ward (yellow card) 5'; Paul (yellow card) 64'; Turci (yellow card) 68' (red card) 79'; Lapa (yellow card) 82'	Report	Lambe (yellow card) 52'; Casiple (yellow card) 58'; Nakkim (yellow card) 82'; Norris (yellow card) 112'; Powers 116'	Stadium: AutoZone Park; Attendance: 3,014; Referee: Ricardo Fierro

=== U.S. Open Cup ===
As a member of the USL Championship, Memphis 901 FC entered the U.S. Open Cup in the Third Round. It was announced by the U.S. Soccer Federation on April 4, that Memphis would face off against Miami United FC of the UPSL, an amateur club, at home. After winning 2–0, they were matched up against FC Dallas of Major League Soccer on April 18, where they would ultimately fail to advance in the tournament, losing 1–0 away on May 7.

April 17 Third Round	Memphis 901 FC (USLC) (Tennessee)	2–0	(Florida) Miami United FC (USSL)	Memphis, Tennessee
6:30 PM	Pickering 31', 85'; Hyndman (yellow card) 63'	Report	Callejas (yellow card) 56'; Pajoy (yellow card) 59'; Daza (yellow card) 60'; Luzuriaga (yellow card) 62'; Benito (yellow card) 86'; Gutiérrez (yellow card) 90'; Aguinaga (yellow card) 90+3'	Stadium: AutoZone Park; Attendance: 724; Referee: Wes Caouette

May 7 Round of 32	FC Dallas (Texas)	1–0	(Tennessee) Memphis 901 FC	Frisco, Texas
19:30 CDT	Illarramendi (yellow card) 41'; Delgado (yellow card) 43'; Farrington 73'; Farfan (yellow card) 81'	Report	Ward (yellow card) 59'; Careaga (yellow card) 88'	Stadium: Toyota Stadium; Attendance: 4,511; Referee: Eduardo Jeff
