= Korede =

Korede is a given name. Notable people with the name include:

- Korede Adedoyin (born 2000), Nigerian footballer
- Korede Aiyegbusi (born 1988), English footballer
- Korede Bello (born 1996), Nigerian singer
- Korede Osundina (born 2004), American soccer player
