= Skëndi =

Skëndi is a surname. Notable people with the surname include:

- Albi Skendi (born 1993), Albanian footballer
- Stavro Skëndi (1905–1989), Albanian American linguist and historian
