= Luís Fernando =

- Gender: Male

Origin
- Region of origin: Portuguese

Luís Fernando or Luiz Fernando is a given name. Notable people with the name include:

- Luiz Fernando Guimarães (born 1949), Brazilian actor
- Luís Fernando Gaúcho, (born 1955), Brazilian footballer
- Luiz Fernando Carvalho (born 1960), Brazilian director, producer, writer and film editor
- Luís Fernando Flores (born 1964), Brazilian football attacking midfielder
- Luis Fernando Sepúlveda (born 1974), Chilean track and road cyclist
- Luis Fernando Camacho (born 1979), Bolivian businessman and politician
- Luís Fernando (footballer, born 1983), Luís Fernando Rodrigues dos Santos, Brazilian football striker
- Luís Fernando (footballer, born 1998), Luís Fernando Santos da Conceicao, Brazilian football defensive midfielder
- Luiz Fernando (footballer, born February 1988), Luiz Fernando Pongelupe Machado, Brazilian football goalkeeper
- Luiz Fernando (footballer, born July 1988), Luiz Fernando Corrêa Sales, Brazilian football attacking midfielder
- Luiz Fernando (footballer, born 1995), Luiz Fernando Ferreira Maximiniano, Brazilian football defensive midfielder
- Luiz Fernando (footballer, born 1996), Luiz Fernando Moraes dos Santos, Brazilian football attacking midfielder
- Luiz Fernando (footballer, born 1997), Luiz Fernando Nascimento, Brazilian football midfielder
- Luiz Fernando (footballer, born 1999), Luiz Fernando Ferreira de Souza, Brazilian football forward
- Luis Fernando (footballer, born 2005), Luis Fernando Santos Oliveira, Brazilian football forward

== See also ==
- Luis
- Fernando
