= Kobi Henry =

Trinidadian soccer player (born 2004)

Personal information
- Full name: Kobi Joseph Henry
- Date of birth: April 26, 2004 (age 22)
- Place of birth: Lakeland, Florida, U.S.
- Height: 6 ft 2 in (1.88 m)
- Position: Center-back

Team information
- Current team: Real Salt Lake
- Number: 3

Youth career
- Florida Rush
- 2018–2019: Orlando City
- 2019–2020: Inter Miami

Senior career*
Years	Team	Apps	(Gls)
2020–2022	Orange County SC	27	(1)
2022–2025	Reims B	15	(0)
2023–2024	→ Villefranche (loan)	12	(0)
2025	→ Real Salt Lake (loan)	3	(0)
2026–	Real Salt Lake	0	(0)
2026–	Real Monarchs	0	(0)

International career^{‡}
2020	United States U17	2	(0)
2022	United States U20	2	(0)
2025–	Trinidad and Tobago	6	(2)
- * Club domestic league appearances and goals as of June 6, 2025 ‡ National team caps and goals as of November 18, 2025

Kobi Joseph Henry (born April 26, 2004) is a professional soccer player who plays as a center-back for Major League Soccer club Real Salt Lake. Born in the United States, he represents the Trinidad and Tobago national team.

== Club career ==
=== Early career ===
Henry was born in Lakeland, Florida, to athletic parents; his father was a semi-professional soccer player, and his mother did track and field. His grandfather Ken Henry was a strength and conditioning coach for the Trinidad and Tobago national team. His parents both went into teaching, and as a result lived in 10 different places growing up including New York, New Jersey, and even Bermuda. He was part of the Florida Rush soccer academy attending laurel Springs School for NCAA approved online high school flexibility while traveling while athletically joining Orlando City's youth side in 2018. He then joined the Inter Miami academy a year later, before signing a professional contract with the USL Championship side Orange County SC on June 18, 2020. He made his competitive debut for the club on August 22, 2020, against LA Galaxy II. He came on as a stoppage-time substitute for Brian Iloski as Orange County won 2–1. Henry won the 2021 USL Championship Playoffs with Orange County, although he was an unused sub in the game against the Tampa Bay Rowdies.

=== Reims ===
On June 14, 2022, Henry signed for the French club Stade de Reims on a five-year contract. The transfer fee paid to Orange County was $700,000, a record in the USL Championship. He was initially assigned to Reims's reserve side in the Championnat National 2.

==== Loan to Villafranche ====
Ahead of the 2023–24 season, Henry joined Villefranche on a season-long loan.

== International career ==
Born in the United States, Henry is of Trinidadian descent. He has represented the Under States national under-17 team. He was called up to the United States senior camp in December 2021 but did not appear in the game against Bosnia and Herzegovina. On October 10, 2025, Henry scored his first goal for Trinidad and Tobago in a 3-0 win over Bermuda.

Henry made his debut for Trinidad and Tobago national football team on September 5, 2025 in a World Cup qualifier versus Curacao

== Career statistics ==
=== Club ===
As of October 15, 2023

Appearances and goals by club, season and competition
Club	Season	League			National cup		Continental		Other		Total	
Club	Season	Division	Apps	Goals	Apps	Goals	Apps	Goals	Apps	Goals	Apps	Goals
Orange County SC	2020	USL Championship	4	0	—		—		—		4	0
Orange County SC	2021	USL Championship	18	1	—		—		1 (Note: Appearance(s) in USL Championship Playoffs)	0	19	1
Orange County SC	2022	USL Championship	5	0	2	1	—		—		7	1
Orange County SC	Total		27	1	2	1	—		1	0	30	2
Reims B	2022–23	Championnat National 2	15	0	—		—		—		15	0
Villefranche (loan)	2023–24	Championnat National	12	0	1	0	—		—		13	0
Career total			54	1	3	1	0	0	1	0	58	2

=== International ===
Scores and results list Trinidad and Tobago goal tally first, score column indicates score after each Henry goal

List of international goals scored by Kobi Henry
No.	Date	Venue	Opponent	Score	Result	Competition
1	10 October 2025	Bermuda National Stadium, Hamilton, Bermuda	Bermuda	3–0	3–0	2026 FIFA World Cup qualification
2	18 November 2025	Hasely Crawford Stadium, Port of Spain, Trinidad and Tobago	Bermuda	1–0	2–1	2026 FIFA World Cup qualification

== Honors ==
Orange County

- USL Championship: 2021
