= Owen Lambe =

American soccer player (born 2000)

Personal information
- Date of birth: August 15, 2000 (age 26)
- Place of birth: Santa Barbara, California, United States
- Height: 1.78 m (5 ft 10 in)
- Position: Defender

Team information
- Current team: Drogheda United
- Number: 23

Youth career
- 2016–2018: Santa Barbara High School

College career
Years	Team	Apps	(Gls)
2019–2020	Cal State Fullerton Titans	19	(2)

Senior career*
Years	Team	Apps	(Gls)
2021–2022	LA Galaxy II	61	(0)
2022	LA Galaxy	0	(0)
2023–2024	Orange County SC	59	(4)
2025–	Drogheda United	34	(0)
- * Club domestic league appearances and goals as of 18:38, 10 November 2026 (UTC)

Owen Lambe (born August 15, 2000) is an American soccer player who currently plays as a defender for Drogheda United in the League of Ireland First Division.

== Career ==
=== College ===
Lambe played one season of college soccer at California State University, Fullerton, where he scored two goals and tallied one assist in 19 appearances for Titans. The 2020 season was cancelled due to the COVID-19 pandemic.

=== LA Galaxy ===
On April 27, 2021, Lambe signed with USL Championship side LA Galaxy II. Lambe made his professional debut on April 30, 2021, starting in a 1–0 loss to Sacramento Republic. On May 11, 2022, Lambe made his senior debut for LA Galaxy and scored his first senior career goal in a 3–2 win over California United Strikers in the U.S. Open Cup.

=== Orange County SC ===
Lambe joined Orange County SC in January 2023.

=== Drogheda United ===
On 20 January 2025, Lambe signed for League of Ireland Premier Division club Drogheda United. He made a total of 39 appearances in all competitions in his first season with Drogheda. On 6 November 2025, he signed a new one-year-contract with the club. On 5 December 2025, it was announced that Lambe had suffered a torn Anterior cruciate ligament injury while training by himself in America in order to stay fit ahead of pre-season training which was due to start just 10 days later, with the injury making him miss the entirety of the 2026 season.

== Career statistics ==
As of match played on 1 November 2025

Appearances and goals by club, season and competition
Club	Season	League			National Cup (Note: Includes U.S. Open Cup & FAI Cup)		Other		Total	
Club	Season	Division	Apps	Goals	Apps	Goals	Apps	Goals	Apps	Goals
LA Galaxy II	2022	USL Championship	29	0	–		–		29	0
LA Galaxy II	2022	USL Championship	32	0	–		–		32	0
LA Galaxy II	Total		61	0	–		–		61	0
LA Galaxy	2022	Major League Soccer	0	0	1	1	0	0	1	1
Orange County	2023	USL Championship	25	2	0	0	2 (Note: Appearances in the 2023 USL Championship Playoffs)	0	27	2
Orange County	2024	USL Championship	34	2	1	0	2 (Note: Appearances in the 2023 USL Championship Playoffs)	0	37	2
Orange County	Total		59	4	1	0	4	0	64	4
Drogheda United	2025	LOI Premier Division	34	0	3	0	2 (Note: 1 appearance in the President of Ireland's Cup; 1 appearance in the Leinster Senior Cup)	0	39	0
Drogheda United	2026	LOI Premier Division	0	0	0	0	0	0	0	0
Drogheda United	Total		34	0	3	0	2	0	39	4
Career Total			154	4	5	1	4	0	172	5
