= Kyle Scott =

Soccer player (born 1997)

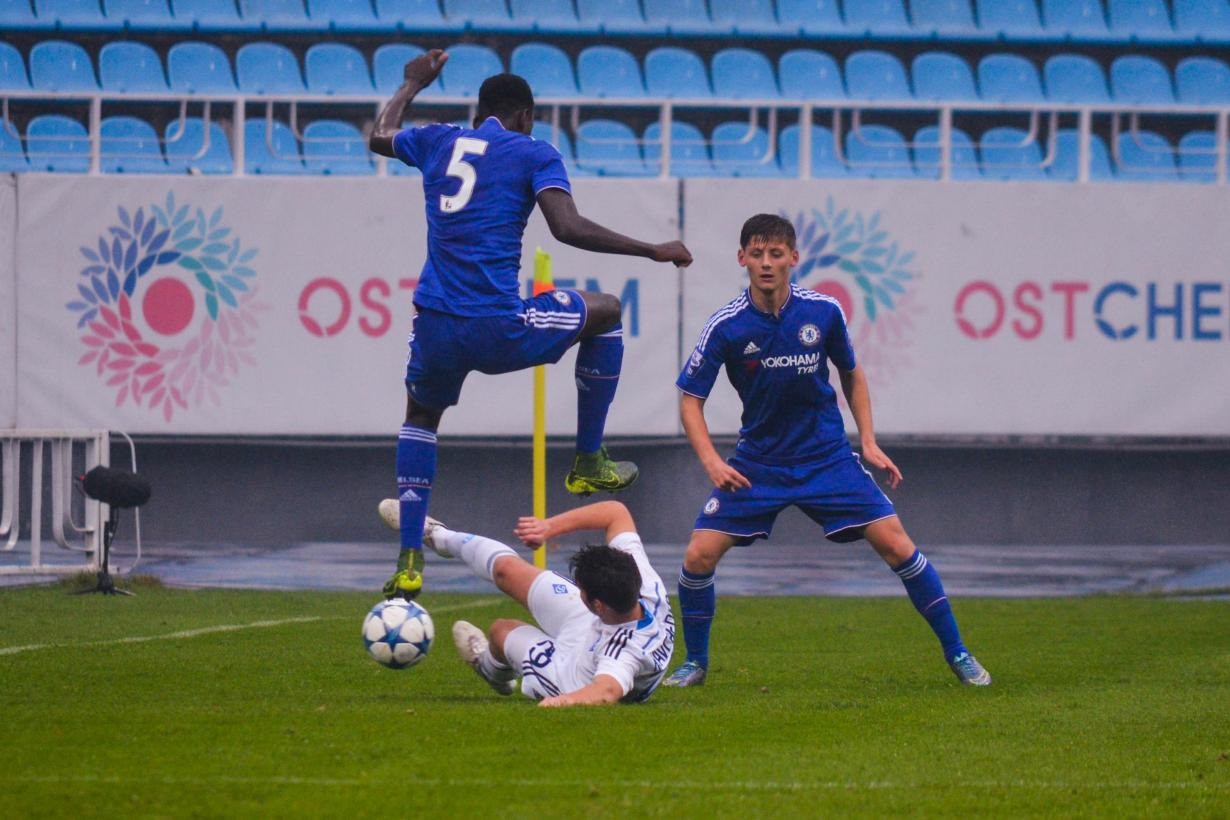
- Kyle Scott (right) in 2015.

Personal information
- Full name: Kyle Michael Scott
- Date of birth: December 22, 1997 (age 28)
- Place of birth: Bath, England
- Height: 5 ft 8 in (1.73 m)
- Position: Midfielder

Team information
- Current team: Las Vegas Lights
- Number: 8

Youth career
- –2007: Southampton
- 2007–2018: Chelsea

Senior career*
Years	Team	Apps	(Gls)
2018–2019	Chelsea	0	(0)
2018–2019	→ Telstar (loan)	14	(2)
2019–2021	Newcastle United	0	(0)
2021–2022	FC Cincinnati	4	(0)
2022–2025	Orange County SC	75	(2)
2025–2026	Crawley Town	9	(0)
2026–	Las Vegas Lights	11	(0)

International career^{‡}
2013	England U16	1	(0)
2013	Republic of Ireland U17	2	(0)
2013–2014	United States U18	2	(0)
2015	United States U20	2	(1)
- * Club domestic league appearances and goals as of November 8, 2026 ‡ National team caps and goals as of October 22, 2022

Kyle Michael Scott (born December 22, 1997) is a professional soccer player who plays as a midfielder for USL Championship club Las Vegas Lights. Born in England, he has played international soccer at youth level for three countries, most recently the United States under-20 national team.

== Club career ==
=== Chelsea ===
Scott joined Chelsea in 2007 as under-10 from Southampton and went onto make his under-18 debut in August 2013. Scott subsequently made his UEFA Youth League debut at the age of 15 before making his first European start in early 2014. In April 2016, Scott reportedly handed in a transfer request following a lack of first-team opportunities and a few months later, he joined Dutch side Willem II on a short-term trial period with a view to a loan move. However, this supposed move broke down.

Preceding the 2017–18 campaign, Scott was promoted to the first-team squad and was given the number 36 jersey. Following several matchday squad appearances, Scott finally made his first-team debut during Chelsea's 4–0 home victory over Hull City in the FA Cup fifth round on February 16, 2018.

On July 14, 2018, Scott agreed to join Dutch second-tier side Telstar on a season-long loan. On the opening day of the 2018–19 campaign, Scott went onto make his Telstar debut during their 1–0 away defeat to RKC Waalwijk, replacing Anass Najah in the 63rd minute.

He was released by Chelsea on July 1, 2019.

=== Newcastle United ===
On July 29, 2019, Newcastle United announced the signing of Kyle Scott on a two-year deal.

On June 1, 2021, Newcastle announced that Scott would be released at the end of his contract that summer.

=== FC Cincinnati ===
On August 31, 2021, Scott joined Major League Soccer club FC Cincinnati on a deal lasting until the end of the 2022 season. On February 2, 2022, Scott and Cincinnati mutually agreed to terminate his contract with the club.

=== Orange County SC ===
On August 4, 2022, Scott signed with USL Championship side Orange County SC for the remainder of the season.

=== Crawley Town ===
On July 17, 2025, Scott returned to England, signing a three-year contract with EFL League Two club Crawley Town.

=== Las Vegas Lights ===
On 8 January 2026, Scott returned to the United States, joining USL Championship club Las Vegas Lights for an undisclosed fee on a three-year deal.

== International career ==
Scott has represented England at the under-16 level, Republic of Ireland at under-17 level, and United States at both under-18 and under-20 levels. He is also eligible for Italy.

== Career statistics ==
As of match played July 9, 2023

Appearances and goals by club, season and competition
Club	Season	League			National cup		League cup		Continental		Other		Total	
Club	Season	Division	Apps	Goals	Apps	Goals	Apps	Goals	Apps	Goals	Apps	Goals	Apps	Goals
Chelsea U23	2016–17	—			—		—		—		2 (Note: Appearances in the EFL Trophy)	0	2	0
Chelsea U23	2017–18	—			—		—		—		3	0	3	0
Chelsea U23	Total		—		—		—		—		5	0	5	0
Chelsea	2017–18	Premier League	0	0	1	0	0	0	0	0	0	0	1	0
Chelsea	2018–19	Premier League	0	0	0	0	0	0	0	0	0	0	0	0
Chelsea	Total		0	0	1	0	0	0	0	0	0	0	1	0
Telstar (loan)	2018–19	Eerste Divisie	14	2	0	0	—		—		—		14	2
Newcastle United U23	2019–20	—			—		—		—		3	0	3	0
Newcastle United	2019–20	Premier League	0	0	0	0	0	0	—		—		0	0
Newcastle United	2020–21	Premier League	0	0	0	0	0	0	—		—		0	0
Newcastle United	Total		0	0	0	0	0	0	—		—		0	0
FC Cincinnati	2021	Major League Soccer	4	0	0	0	—		—		—		4	0
Orange County SC	2022	USL Championship	8	0	0	0	—		—		—		8	0
Orange County SC	2023	USL Championship	33	0	1	0	—		—		—		34	0
Orange County SC	2024	USL Championship	9	1	1	0	—		—		—		10	1
Orange County SC	Total		50	1	2	0	—		—		—		52	1
Career total			68	3	3	0	0	0	0	0	8	0	79	3

== Honours ==
Chelsea Reserves

- FA Youth Cup: 2013–14, 2014–15, 2015–16
- UEFA Youth League: 2014–15, 2015–16
