= Luís Fernando (footballer, born 1998) =

Brazilian footballer (born 1998)

Personal information
- Full name: Luís Fernando Santos da Conceicao
- Date of birth: 27 January 1998 (age 28)
- Place of birth: São Paulo, Brazil
- Height: 1.83 m (6 ft 0 in)
- Position: Midfielder

Team information
- Current team: Nacional-AM

Youth career
- Palmeiras
- Veranópolis
- Desportivo Brasil
- Bahia

Senior career*
Years	Team	Apps	(Gls)
2016–2019	Bahia	2	(0)
2019–2021	Næstved	27	(0)
2021	Jacuipense	18	(0)
2022	Taubaté	11	(0)
2022	Jacuipense	4	(0)
2023–2024	CRAC	34	(1)
2024	Juventus-SP	0	(0)
2025–	Nacional-AM	11	(0)
- * Club domestic league appearances and goals

Luís Fernando Santos da Conceicao (born 27 January 1998) is a Brazilian footballer who plays as a midfielder for Nacional-AM.

== Career ==
=== Menino de Ouro and early career ===
Fernando competed in the 2013 edition of Brazilian reality television show Menino de Ouro (Golden Boy), in which a number of young footballers competed to win a contract at a club in São Paulo. Having impressed judges Zetti and Edmílson, Fernando won the show, earning a contract at professional side Palmeiras. Spells with Veranópolis and Desportivo Brasil followed, before he joined the academy of Bahia.

=== Professional career ===
Having progressed through the academy of Bahia, Fernando was promoted to the first team in March 2016, and went on to make his professional debut in the same month, featuring in two Copa do Nordeste games. He was used sparingly over the next three years, and would go on to feature in a total of six games for the club.

In mid-2019, it was announced that Fernando would join Danish 1st Division side Næstved on a permanent basis. Despite having signed a four-year contract, he left the club in March 2021 after only one full season, having returned to Brazil in 2020, following the club's relegation to the Danish 2nd Division.

Following his return to Brazil, he joined Jacuipense. After half a season with Jacuipense, he moved to Taubaté on a permanent deal ahead of the 2022 season. He spent four months with Taubaté, amassing eleven appearances in the Campeonato Paulista A2, before returning to Jacuipense in April 2022. On 12 January 2023, he was announced as a new signing for Campeonato Brasileiro Série D team CRAC. He made his debut three days later, in a 2–0 win against Iporá on 15 January.

In May 2024, Fernando joined Juventus-SP ahead of the Copa Paulista de Futebol de 2024.

== Career statistics ==
=== Club ===
As of 8 October 2024.

Appearances and goals by club, season and competition
Club	Season	League			State League		Cup		Continental		Other		Total	
Club	Season	Division	Apps	Goals	Apps	Goals	Apps	Goals	Apps	Goals	Apps	Goals	Apps	Goals
Bahia	2016	Série B	0	0	0	0	1 (Note: Appearances in the Copa do Brasil)	0	—		2 (Note: Appearances in the Copa do Nordeste)	0	3	0
Bahia	2017	Série A	0	0	0	0	0	0	—		0	0	0	0
Bahia	2018	Série A	0	0	0	0	0	0	0	0	1	0	1	0
Bahia	2019	Série A	0	0	2 (Note: Appearances in the Campeonato Baiano)	0	0	0	0	0	0	0	2	0
Bahia	Total		0	0	2	0	1	0	0	0	3	0	6	0
Næstved	2019–20	Danish 1st Division	27	0	–		2 (Note: Appearances in the Danish Cup)	1	—		0	0	29	1
Næstved	2020–21	Danish 2nd Division	0	0	–		0	0	—		0	0	0	0
Næstved	Total		27	0	0	0	2	1	0	0	0	0	29	1
Jacuipense	2021	Série C	12	0	6	0	0	0	—		2	0	20	0
Taubaté	2022	–			11 (Note: Appearances in the Campeonato Paulista A2)	0	0	0	—		0	0	11	0
Jacuipense	2022	Série D	4	0	0	0	0	0	—		0	0	4	0
CRAC	2023	Série D	13	0	11 (Note: Appearances in the Campeonato Goiano)	1	0	0	—		0	0	24	1
CRAC	2024	Série D	0	0	10	0	0	0	—		0	0	10	0
CRAC	Total		13	0	21	1	0	0	0	0	0	0	34	1
Juventus-SP	2024	–			0	0	0	0	—		9 (Note: Appearances in the Copa Paulista)	0	9	0
Nacional-AM	2025	–			11 (Note: Appearances in the Campeonato Amazonense)	0	0	0	—		0	0	11	0
Career total			56	0	51	1	3	1	0	0	14	0	124	2
