= Alex Villanueva (soccer) =

American soccer player

Personal information
- Date of birth: July 9, 2002 (age 24)
- Place of birth: Lancaster, California, United States
- Height: 5 ft 9 in (1.75 m)
- Positions: Fullback; winger

Youth career
- Mainz 05
- La Roca
- 2017–2018: Real Salt Lake
- 2018–2019: Seattle Sounders

Senior career*
Years	Team	Apps	(Gls)
2019–2021	Tacoma Defiance	42	(2)
2021	Seattle Sounders FC	2	(0)
2022–2023	Orange County SC	51	(1)
2024–2025	Detroit City FC	62	(2)
2026	Greenville Triumph SC		
- * Club domestic league appearances and goals as of October 25, 2025

Alex Villanueva (born July 9, 2002) is an American soccer player who plays as a midfielder for USL League One side Greenville Triumph.
