= Albi Skendi =

Albanian footballer

Personal information
- Date of birth: 26 September 1993 (age 33)
- Place of birth: Albania
- Height: 6 ft 6 in (1.98 m)
- Positions: Defender; midfielder

Youth career
- –2011: Oxford City

College career
Years	Team	Apps	(Gls)
2015	SBCC Vaqueros	20	(2)
2016	Marymount California Mariners		

Senior career*
Years	Team	Apps	(Gls)
2011–2012	Oxford City	8	(1)
2012–2013	Banbury United	31	(10)
2013	Oxford City	4	(0)
2013–2014	Banbury United	20	(3)
2018	L.A. Wolves		
2018–2019	Stratford Town	31	(1)
2019–2022	Yeovil Town	71	(9)
2022	Orange County SC	29	(3)
- * Club domestic league appearances and goals as of 10:37, 5 October 2022 (UTC)

Albi Skendi (born 26 September 1993) is an Albanian professional footballer who plays as a defender.

== Early life ==
Skendi was born in Albania, with his family fleeing the country to Greece, Skendi lived with his grandmother until he was aged five. Skendi joined his family in Greece for a year, before relocating permanently to Oxford in England.

== Career ==
=== Early career ===
Skendi's career began in the lower leagues of England with Oxford City and Banbury United. Skendi had two spells with each team, helping Oxford City to the Nomads Hellenic League Championship in the 2011–12 season before joining Southern Football League side Banbury United in November 2012. He returned to Oxford City before going back to Banbury after struggling for playing time in the National League North with Oxford at the start of the 2013 season. During his second-spell at Banbury, Skendi reportedly considered quitting the game and struggled with disciplinary issues.

=== Move to the United States ===
In 2015, Skendi opted to stop playing professionally and moved to the United States to study finance at Santa Barbara City College. He played a single season of college soccer with the Vaqueroes in 2015, making 20 appearances, scoring two goals and tallying two assists. He transferred to Marymount California University and played with the team's soccer team in 2016.

In the summer of 2018, Skendi also played with amateur United Premier Soccer League side L.A. Wolves.

=== Return to England ===
In 2018, Skendi opted to return to England to continue playing footballer, joining Stratford Town for a season. Skendi made the move up the divisions in the summer of 2019, signing with National League side Yeovil Town. He went on to score nine goals in 73 appearances for the Glovers, becoming a fan favourite along the way.

Prior to the 2021 season, Skendi was under contract with Yeovil, but hadn't returned to the club from the United States and remained absent from the club. He was reported to have played California with singer Justin Bieber with local side Churchhome FC. On March 4, 2022, it was announced he had officially left Yeovil

=== Orange County SC ===
On 4 March 2022, Skendi signed with USL Championship club Orange County SC. He debuted for the club on 12 March 2022 as an 83rd–minute substitute during a 1–2 loss to Colorado Springs Switchbacks.
