= Korede Osundina =

American soccer player

Personal information
- Full name: Oluwakorede David Osundina
- Date of birth: February 13, 2004 (age 22)
- Place of birth: Naperville, Illinois, United States
- Height: 6 ft 0 in (1.83 m)
- Position: Winger

Team information
- Current team: Muğlaspor (on loan from Casa Pia)
- Number: 13

Youth career
- 2014–2020: Crossfire Premier
- 2020–2022: Barça Residency Academy

Senior career*
Years	Team	Apps	(Gls)
2022–2023	Orange County SC	37	(4)
2023–2025	Feyenoord	0	(0)
2023–2025	→ FC Dordrecht (loan)	49	(10)
2025–	Casa Pia	27	(2)
2026–	→ Muğlaspor (loan)	1	(1)

International career
2022–2023	United States U19	6	(2)
- * Club domestic league appearances and goals as of September 6, 2026

Oluwakorede David Osundina (born February 13, 2004) is an American professional soccer player who plays as a winger for TFF 1. Lig club Muğlaspor on loan from Primeira Liga club Casa Pia.

== Club career ==
=== Youth ===
Osundina was born in Naperville, Illinois, but raised in Redmond, Washington, where he played six seasons with Crossfire Premier. In September 2020, Osundina made the move to join the Barça Residency Academy in Casa Grande, Arizona to compete in the MLS Next. During that time, he played for the club's U19 team that advanced to the Round of 16 in the 2021 MLS Next Cup after entering the tournament as the undefeated No.1 seed. Osundina verbally committed to playing college soccer at Cornell University in 2022.

=== Orange County SC ===
On January 20, 2022, Osundina signed a multi-year contract with USL Championship club Orange County SC. He debuted for the club on March 12, 2022, as an 76th–minute substitute during a 1–2 loss to Colorado Springs Switchbacks.

=== Feyenoord ===
On August 30, 2023, Osundina joined Dutch club Feyenoord on a three-year contract. As part of the move, Osundina will spend the 2023–2024 season on loan at second-tier club FC Dordrecht.

=== Casa Pia ===
On February 1, 2025, Osundina moved to Primeira Liga side Casa Pia.

== Personal life ==
Born in the United States, Osundina is of Nigerian descent.

== Career statistics ==
=== Club ===
As of match played March 15, 2024

Club	Season	League			National cup (Note: Includes U.S. Open Cup and KNVB Cup)		Continental		Other		Total	
Club	Season	Division	Apps	Goals	Apps	Goals	Apps	Goals	Apps	Goals	Apps	Goals
Orange County SC	2022	USL Championship	19	0	2	0	—		—		21	0
Orange County SC	2023	USL Championship	18	4	2	0	—		—		20	4
Orange County SC	Total		37	4	4	0	—		—		41	4
Feyenoord	2023–24	Eredivisie	0	0	—		—		0	0	0	0
FC Dordrecht (loan)	2023–24	Eerste Divisie	21	2	2	0	—		—		23	2
Career total			58	6	6	0	0	0	0	0	64	6
