= Ryan Doghman =

Norwegian footballer (born 1997)

Personal information
- Full name: Ryan Doghman
- Date of birth: 14 June 1997 (age 29)
- Place of birth: Oslo, Norway
- Height: 1.79 m (5 ft 10 in)
- Positions: Left-back; winger

Team information
- Current team: Orange County SC
- Number: 23

Senior career*
Years	Team	Apps	(Gls)
2016	Oppsal	0	(0)
2017–2020	Raufoss	88	(15)
2021–2022	Åsane	54	(6)
2023–	Orange County SC	103	(6)
- * Club domestic league appearances and goals as of 13:57, 10 November 2026 (UTC)

Ryan Doghman (born 14 June 1997) is a Norwegian professional footballer who plays as a left-back for USL Championship side Orange County SC.

== Career ==
Doghman made a single appearance for 2. divisjon side Oppsal in the NM Cup in 2016, before moving to Raufoss, where he played in the 2. divisjon and 1. divisjon and later with Åsane in the 1. divisjon. On 10 January 2023, Doghman signed with USL Championship side Orange County SC ahead of their 2023 season. He debuted for Orange County as a 53rd-minute substitute during a 3–1 loss to Louisville City.
