= Morten Karlsen =

Danish footballer and manager (born 1979)

Personal information
- Date of birth: 25 March 1979 (age 47)
- Place of birth: Copenhagen, Denmark
- Height: 1.76 m (5 ft 9 1/2 in)
- Position: Midfielder

Senior career*
Years	Team	Apps	(Gls)
–2002	B.93		(3)
2002–2004	Zwolle	53	(2)
2004–2010	Nordsjælland	129	(0)
2010	Randers	30	(0)
2011–2012	Esbjerg fB	35	(0)
2012–2013	Lyngby	15	(0)
2013–2014	HB Køge	39	(0)

Managerial career
- 2014–2018: FC Nordsjælland U19
- 2018–2019: HB Køge
- 2020–2022: AGF (assistant)
- 2023: Orange County SC (assistant)
- 2023–2024: Orange County SC
- 2024–2025: Lyngby
- * Club domestic league appearances and goals

Morten Karlsen (born 25 March 1979) is a Danish former professional football defender and manager.

He previously played at FC Nordsjælland, Randers FC, FC Zwolle, B.93, Esbjerg fB and Lyngby BK before ending has career at HB Køge.

In June 2024, Karlsen left Orange County to return to Denmark, taking over as manager at Lyngby. After a relegation to the 2025-26 Danish 1st Division and a bad start on the new season, Karlsen was fired on 2 September 2025.

== Managerial statistics ==
As of match played 24 May 2025

Managerial record by team and tenure
Team	Nat	From	To	Record								Ref
Team	Nat	From	To	G	W	D	L	GF	GA	GD	Win %	Ref
HB Køge	(Denmark)	28 May 2018	1 December 2019	58	22	16	20	95	83	+12	37.93	
Orange County SC	(United States)	1 May 2023	24 June 2024	43	22	6	15	57	49	+8	51.16	
Lyngby Boldklub	(Denmark)	1 July 2024	Present	33	5	12	16	27	47	−20	15.15	
Total				134	49	34	51	179	179	+0	36.57	—
