= Akeem O'Connor-Ward =

American soccer player (born 1996)

Personal information
- Full name: Akeem O'Connor-Ward
- Date of birth: January 5, 1996 (age 30)
- Place of birth: Vienna, Virginia, United States
- Height: 5 ft 7 in (1.70 m)
- Position: Defender

Team information
- Current team: San Antonio FC
- Number: 13

College career
Years	Team	Apps	(Gls)
2015	Hastings Broncos	20	(2)
2016–2018	Creighton Bluejays	47	(2)

Senior career*
Years	Team	Apps	(Gls)
2016–2017	Lane United	23	(0)
2018	Chicago FC United	7	(0)
2019	D.C. United	1	(0)
2019	→ Loudoun United (loan)	9	(0)
2019	Birmingham Legion	13	(0)
2020	North Carolina FC	11	(1)
2021–2022	Oakland Roots	32	(1)
2022	→ Rio Grande Valley FC (loan)	14	(2)
2023–2024	Memphis 901	64	(3)
2025	Colorado Springs Switchbacks	25	(0)
2026–	San Antonio FC	29	(1)
- * Club domestic league appearances and goals as of October 31, 2026

Akeem O'Connor-Ward (born January 5, 1996) is an American soccer player who plays as a defender for San Antonio FC.

== Career ==
Ward was selected 14th overall by D.C. United in the 2019 MLS SuperDraft, and he signed a professional contract with the club on January 31, 2019. “We had him rated as the best right back in the draft,” said United GM Dave Kasper. “We liked everything about him."

He was loaned out to D.C.'s USL affiliate Loudoun United in March 2019. He made his USL Championship debut on March 9, 2019, as he played all ninety minutes in a 2–0 away defeat to Nashville SC. He was waived by DC United on July 24, 2019.

Ward joined USL Championship side Birmingham Legion FC on July 30, 2019.

In February 2020, Ward signed with North Carolina FC. He scored the first goal of his professional career on August 8, 2020, the lone tally in a 1–0 NCFC win over Memphis 901 FC. He was later suspended for two games by the USL Championship for kicking Charlotte Independence player Clay Dimick in the neck during a game on August 26, 2020. Ward apologized in a tweet, saying he "lashed out" without intending to hit Dimick.

On January 13, 2021, Ward signed with Oakland Roots ahead of their inaugural USL Championship season. On July 8, 2022, Ward was loaned to USL Championship side Rio Grande Valley FC for the remainder of the season. He left Oakland following their 2022 season.

Ward joined Memphis 901 on January 18, 2023.

Memphis 901 folded following the 2024 season, and Ward subsequently signed with Colorado Springs Switchbacks on January 1, 2025. Following the 2025 season, Colorado Springs opted to buyout his contract with the club and he became a free agent.
