= Walid Yacoubou =

Togolese footballer (born 1997)

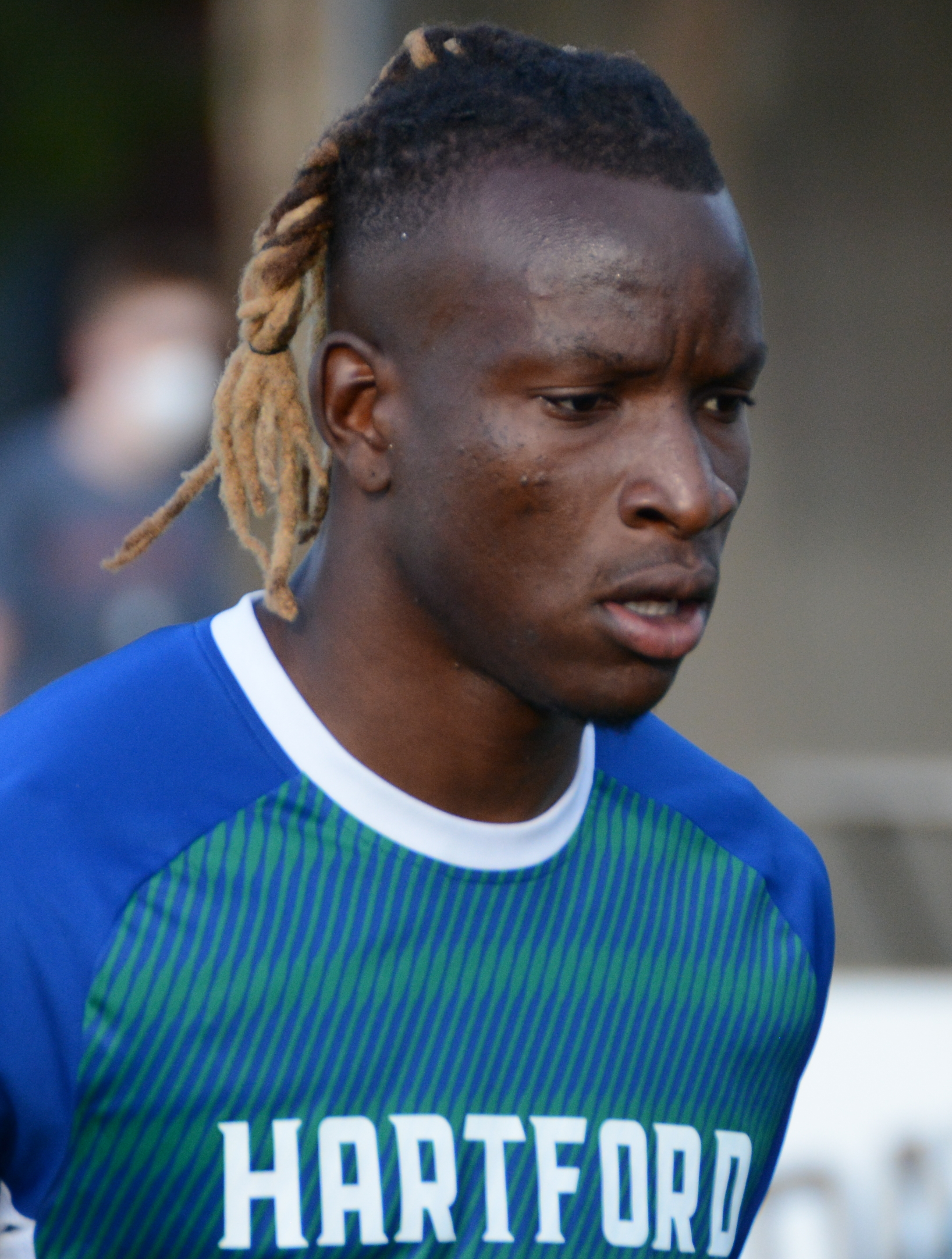
- Yacoubou with Hartford Athletic in 2021

Personal information
- Full name: Abdel Walid Yacoubou
- Date of birth: 9 April 1997 (age 29)
- Place of birth: Tel Aviv, Israel
- Height: 1.88 m (6 ft 2 in)
- Position: Defender

Team information
- Current team: Miami FC
- Number: 6

Youth career
- IFK Maryland

College career
Years	Team	Apps	(Gls)
2015–2016	PGCC Owls	35	(0)
2017	NCWC Battling Bishops	19	(2)

Senior career*
Years	Team	Apps	(Gls)
2018	HFK Třebíč	5	(0)
2018	North Carolina FC U23	12	(1)
2018	IFK Holmsund	6	(0)
2019	Tulsa Roughnecks	4	(0)
2020	Sporting Ideal	5	(0)
2021–2023	Hartford Athletic	52	(3)
2023	San Antonio FC	6	(1)
2024	Memphis 901	21	(0)
2025–	Miami FC	22	(0)
- * Club domestic league appearances and goals as of November 7, 2026

Abdel Walid Yacoubou (born 9 April 1997), also known as Tulu, is a Togolese footballer who plays as a defender for USL Championship club Miami FC.

== Early life ==
Yacoubou was born in Tel Aviv, Israel but lived in Lomé, Togo with an aunt and cousins throughout the early years of his childhood. He moved to Adelphi, Maryland in the United States at age 12 and did not play on his high school soccer team until his senior year at age 17.

== Career ==
=== College ===
Yacoubou played college soccer for three years, beginning at Prince George's Community College in 2015, before transferring after two seasons to North Carolina Wesleyan College.

=== Professional ===
After college, Yacoubu moved to Czech Fourth Division side HFK Třebíč, where he stayed for 3-months.

He returned to the United States to play with USL PDL side North Carolina FC U23.

In 2018, Yacoubou signed for Swedish Division 3 side IFK Holmsund.

On 6 May 2019 Yacoubou signed for USL Championship side Tulsa Roughnecks.

Following his time in Tulsa, Yacoubou signed for Portuguese side Sporting Clube Ideal.

On 27 April 2021 Yacoubou signed for USL Championship side Hartford Athletic. He scored his first goal for Hartford on 17 July 2021 in a 3–1 loss vs. Charleston Battery.

On 24 May 2023 Yacoubou was transferred to USL Championship side San Antonio FC for an undisclosed fee.

Yacoubou signed with Memphis 901 on 9 January 2024, ahead of their 2024 season in the USL Championship. Memphis 901 suspended operations following the 2024 season.

In February 2025, Tulu signed with Miami FC.

In September 2025, it was announced that Tulu has entered into a partnership with Local Spark Digital Solutions and Ringba to wear custom cleats during the remainder of the 2025 USL season.

== Personal life ==
Yacoubou is trilingual, speaking French, English, and Ewe.
