= Bruno Lapa =

Brazilian footballer (born 1997)

Personal information
- Full name: Bruno Felipe Serbena Lapa
- Date of birth: 10 May 1997 (age 29)
- Place of birth: Curitiba, Brazil
- Height: 5 ft 9 in (1.75 m)
- Position: Attacking midfielder

Team information
- Current team: Oakland Roots
- Number: 2

Youth career
- Paraná
- 2008–2013: Athletico Paranaense
- 2014–2016: Montverde Academy

College career
Years	Team	Apps	(Gls)
2016–2019	Wake Forest Demon Deacons	80	(23)

Senior career*
Years	Team	Apps	(Gls)
2018	SIMA Águilas	12	(4)
2019	North Carolina Fusion U23	11	(4)
2020–2022	Birmingham Legion	67	(17)
2023–2024	Memphis 901	60	(15)
2025	Ansan Greeners	36	(1)
2026	FC Tulsa	10	(0)
2026–	Oakland Roots	10	(1)
- * Club domestic league appearances and goals as of 10:55, 10 November 2026 (UTC)

Bruno Felipe Serbena Lapa (born 10 May 1997) is a Brazilian professional footballer who plays as an attacking midfielder for USL Championship club Oakland Roots.

== Career ==
=== Youth and college ===
Born in Curitiba, Lapa played in the youth academies of Paraná and Athletico Paranaense, before moving to the United States in 2014, when he joined the Montverde Academy in Florida.

In 2016, Lapa began playing college soccer at Wake Forest University. At Wake Forest, Lapa made 80 appearances, scoring 23 goals and tallying 15 assists. In his junior year, Lapa was named the 2018 ACC Midfielder of the Year, was a MAC Hermann Trophy Semi-finalist, and a United Soccer Coaches and College Soccer News First Team All-American.

Whilst at college, Lapa played in the USL League Two for both SIMA Águilas in 2018 and North Carolina Fusion U23 in 2019.

=== Professional ===
==== Birmingham Legion ====
Lapa signed his first professional contract with USL Championship side Birmingham Legion on 14 February 2020. He made his professional debut on 15 July 2020 against Memphis 901, scoring two goals and assisting the third in a 3–0 win.

At the end of the 2020 season, Lapa was named as an All-League First Team selection; he subsequently signed a multi-year contract with Birmingham. On 2 August 2022, Lapa was named USL Championship Player of the Week for Week 21 of the 2022 season after scoring the first hat-trick in the club's history against Loudoun United.

==== Memphis 901 ====
On 1 February 2023, Lapa joined USL Championship side Memphis 901, signing a multi-year deal.

He left the club at the end of the 2024 season, following the public announcement of the team's folding due to insufficient funding for a new soccer-specific stadium in November of the same year.

==== Ansan Greeners ====
On 9 January 2025, Lapa officially joined K League 2 club Ansan Greeners on a free transfer.

=== FC Tulsa ===
In January 2026, Lapa signed with USL Championship club FC Tulsa for the 2026 USL Championship season.

=== Oakland Roots ===
On 5 August 2026, Lapa was transferred to USL Championship side Oakland Roots.
