= Ashish Chattha =

American soccer player (born 2000)

Personal information
- Date of birth: January 6, 2000 (age 26)
- Place of birth: Fremont, California, United States
- Height: 5 ft 10 in (1.78 m)
- Position: Midfielder

Youth career
- Juventus Academy SV
- Silicon Valley SC

College career
Years	Team	Apps	(Gls)
2018–2019	San Francisco Dons	30	(3)
2021–2022	UC Irvine Anteaters	38	(8)

Senior career*
Years	Team	Apps	(Gls)
2018–2019	San Francisco City	8	(1)
2023–2024	Orange County SC	52	(0)
2025	Las Vegas Lights	1	(0)
- * Club domestic league appearances and goals as of October 28, 2025

Ashish Chattha (born January 6, 2000) is an American soccer player.

== Playing career ==
=== Youth, college and amateur ===
Chattha attended American High School, playing club soccer at Juventus Academy Silicon Valley and Silicon Valley Soccer Club. He also played with the United States Under-15 side in 2015.

In 2018, Chattha attended the University of San Francisco to play college soccer. In two seasons with the Dons, Chattha made 30 appearances, scoring three goals and tallying two assists. After the 2020 season was canceled due to the COVID-19 pandemic, Chattha transferred to the University of California, Irvine, where he competed for a further two years at the college level. With the Anteaters, Chattha made 38 appearances, scoring eight times and adding two assists. In both his junior and senior year he earned All-Big West First Team honors.

In 2018 and 2019, Chattha also competed in the USL League Two with San Francisco City FC, scoring one goal in eight appearances.

=== Professional ===
On January 24, 2023, Chattha signed his first professional contract with USL Championship side Orange County SC following a successful trial, including an appearance in a friendly fixture against Hamburger SV. He made his professional debut on March 11, 2023, appearing as a 65th-minute substitute during a 3–1 loss to Louisville City.

On February 27, 2025, Chattha signed a short-term deal with USL Championship side Las Vegas Lights.

== Personal ==
Ashish is of Indian descent. He is a fan of Real Madrid, the Golden State Warriors and the San Francisco 49ers.
