= Colin Shutler =

American soccer player (born 1998)

Personal information
- Date of birth: August 2, 1998 (age 28)
- Place of birth: Middleburg, Virginia, United States
- Height: 6 ft 1 in (1.85 m)
- Position: Goalkeeper

Team information
- Current team: Colorado Springs Switchbacks FC
- Number: 22

Youth career
- –2016: Loudoun FC

College career
Years	Team	Apps	(Gls)
2016–2020	Virginia Cavaliers	45	(0)

Senior career*
Years	Team	Apps	(Gls)
2018–2019	Northern Virginia United	12	(0)
2021	North Texas SC	10	(0)
2022–2025	Orange County SC	94	(1)
2026–	Colorado Springs Switchbacks FC	14	(0)
- * Club domestic league appearances and goals as of November 7, 2026

Colin Shutler (born August 2, 1998) is an American soccer player who currently plays for Colorado Springs Switchbacks FC in the USL Championship.

== Playing career ==
=== Youth, college and amateur ===
Shutler was part of Loudoun FC's 98B Red side, before playing college soccer at the University of Virginia. Shutler redshirted the 2016 season, before going on to make 45 appearances for the Cavaliers, registering 24 shutouts, a 0.68 Goals Against Average rating as well as an 81% save percentage. Shutler also became the first Cavalier goalkeeper to earn first-team all-Atlantic Coast Conference honors since Tony Meola in 1989.

Whilst at college, Shutler also played with NPSL side Northern Virginia United in 2018 and 2019.

=== Professional ===
On January 21, 2021, Shutler was selected 48th overall in the 2021 MLS SuperDraft by FC Dallas. He went on to sign with Dallas' USL League One affiliate side North Texas SC on March 29, 2021.

Shutler made his professional debut on April 24, 2021, starting in a 4–2 win over Fort Lauderdale CF.

On March 9, 2022, Shutler moved to USL Championship side Orange County SC.

On March 9, 2024, Shulter scored a stoppage time game-tying goal against Sacramento Republic FC, becoming the first Orange County goalkeeper to score a goal.
