= Kevin Partida =

American soccer player (born 1995)

Personal information
- Full name: Kevin Partida
- Date of birth: March 10, 1995 (age 31)
- Place of birth: Sparks, Nevada, United States
- Height: 1.73 m (5 ft 8 in)
- Position: Midfielder

Team information
- Current team: Orange County SC
- Number: 19

Youth career
- Sagebrush SC

College career
| Years | Team | Apps | (Gls) |
| 2013–2017 | UNLV Rebels | 80 | (6) |

Senior career*
| Years | Team | Apps | (Gls) |
| 2016 | Burlingame Dragons | 6 | (0) |
| 2017 | FC Tucson | 9 | (2) |
| 2018 | Reno 1868 | 10 | (1) |
| 2018 | → San Jose Earthquakes (loan) | 5 | (0) |
| 2019 | San Jose Earthquakes | 1 | (0) |
| 2019 | → Reno 1868 (loan) | 12 | (0) |
| 2020 | Reno 1868 | 16 | (2) |
| 2020 | Minnesota United | 0 | (0) |
| 2021 | Indy Eleven | 6 | (0) |
| 2022– | Orange County SC | 105 | (1) |
- * Club domestic league appearances and goals as of 13:56, 10 November 2026 (UTC)

Kevin Partida (born March 10, 1995) is an American professional soccer player who plays for Orange County SC in the USL Championship.

== Career ==
=== College and amateur ===
Partida earned All-Region honors during his senior year at Sparks High School, a season which also saw the team win second place in the state.

Partida played for the UNLV Rebels from 2013 to 2017, redshirting during the 2016 season due to a knee injury. During his time in Las Vegas, he earned three WAC all-tournament awards. He was also a part of the team that went to the 2014 WAC championships and the 2014 NCAA Division I Men's Soccer Championship. Partida ended with a total of six goals and six assists over four seasons played.

He spent the summer of 2016 playing with the Burlingame Dragons, of the Premier Development League, where he made six appearances and tallied one assist. In the summer of 2017, Partida made nine appearances and scored two goals for FC Tucson, also of the PDL.

=== Professional ===
On January 21, 2018, Partida was selected in the third round (58th overall) of the 2018 MLS SuperDraft by the San Jose Earthquakes. He was signed by San Jose's USL affiliate Reno 1868 FC on March 13, 2018, where he would join former UNLV teammate and fellow San Jose draft pick Danny Musovski.

On June 9, 2018, Partida joined Reno's MLS parent club San Jose Earthquakes on loan for the remainder of the 2018 season. San Jose picked up their option on Partida and made the move permanent at the end of the 2018 season.

After the 2019 MLS season, Partida was released by San Jose. He rejoined Reno 1868 on December 16, 2019.

On October 30, 2020, following the USL Championship regular season, Partida joined MLS side Minnesota United ahead of their upcoming playoff fixtures.

On September 23, 2021, Partida returned to the USL Championship with Indy Eleven.

Partida signed with Orange County SC on January 10, 2022. On May 12, 2023, Partida was found guilty of using a homophobic slur towards a San Diego Loyal player during a fixture between Orange County and San Diego on May 6, 2023. He was suspended for a total of six matches.

== Personal life ==
Born in the United States, Partida is of Mexican descent.

== Career statistics ==
As of matches played March 13, 2018

| Club | Season | League | | | Cup (Note: Includes appearances in U.S. Open Cup) | | League Cup | | Total | |
| Club | Season | Division | Apps | Goals | Apps | Goals | Apps | Goals | Apps | Goals |
|---|---|---|---|---|---|---|---|---|---|---|
| Reno | 2018 | USL | 0 | 0 | 0 | 0 | 0 | 0 | 0 | 0 |
| Reno | Total | | 0 | 0 | 0 | 0 | 0 | 0 | 0 | 0 |
| Career total | | | 0 | 0 | 0 | 0 | 0 | 0 | 0 | 0 |

== Honors ==
Individual

- WAC All-Tournament: 2014
