= Thomas Amang =

Cameroonian footballer (born 1998)

Personal information
- Full name: Thomas Olivier Amang A Kegueni
- Date of birth: 9 February 1998 (age 28)
- Place of birth: Douala, Cameroon
- Height: 1.74 m (5 ft 9 in)
- Position: Forward

Team information
- Current team: Athletic Club Boise
- Number: 22

Youth career
- Rainbow Bamenda

Senior career*
Years	Team	Apps	(Gls)
2016–2019	Molde	45	(7)
2019	→ Kristiansund (loan)	11	(0)
2019–2021	Gimnàstic	15	(0)
2021–2022	Colorado Springs Switchbacks	12	(3)
2022	San Diego Loyal	31	(11)
2023–2024	Orange County SC	43	(14)
2025	New Mexico United	18	(2)
2026–	Athletic Club Boise	26	(6)
- * Club domestic league appearances and goals as of 12:51, 28 October 2026 (UTC)

Thomas Olivier Amang A Kegueni (born 9 February 1998) is a Cameroonian professional footballer who plays as a forward for Athletic Club Boise in USL League One.

== Career ==
=== Molde ===
Amang signed for Norwegian side Molde FK on 9 February 2016, his 18th birthday. He made his debut for the club in their 4–2 victory over Lillestrøm on 1 April 2016, coming on as a 69th-minute substitute for Fredrik Gulbrandsen.

==== Loan to Kristiansund ====
On 24 March 2019, Amang joined Kristiansund BK on loan for the 2019 season.

=== Gimnàstic ===
On 26 August 2019, Amang signed a two-year contract with Gimnàstic de Tarragona in the Spanish Segunda División B.

=== Colorado Springs Switchbacks ===
On 16 July 2021, Amang signed with USL Championship side Colorado Springs Switchbacks.

=== San Diego Loyal ===
On 23 February 2022, Amang was traded to USL Championship side San Diego Loyal in exchange for Haji Abdikadir.

=== Orange County SC ===
On 3 March 2023, Amang moved to USL Championship side Orange County SC for their 2023 season.

=== New Mexico United ===
On 4 March 2025, New Mexico United announced that Amang had signed with the club for the 2025 USL Championship season.

== Career statistics ==
As of match played 19 July 2021

Club	Season	Division	League		Cup		Europe		Other		Total	
Club	Season	Division	Apps	Goals	Apps	Goals	Apps	Goals	Apps	Goals	Apps	Goals
Molde	2016	Tippeligaen	22	2	2	3	0	0	—		24	5
Molde	2017	Eliteserien	16	4	3	1	—		—		19	5
Molde	2018	Eliteserien	7	1	0	0	0	0	—		7	1
Molde	Total		45	7	5	4	0	0	0	0	50	11
Kristiansund (loan)	2019	Eliteserien	11	0	4	0	—		—		15	0
Kristiansund (loan)	Total		11	0	4	0	0	0	0	0	15	0
Gimnàstic	2019–20	Segunda División B	5	0	1	0	—		2	2	8	2
Gimnàstic	2020–21	Segunda División B	10	0	0	0	—		—		10	0
Gimnàstic	Total		15	0	1	0	0	0	2	2	18	2
Career total			71	7	10	4	0	0	2	2	83	13
