= Seth Casiple =

American soccer player (born 1993)

Personal information
- Full name: Seth Robert Casiple
- Date of birth: August 23, 1993 (age 33)
- Place of birth: Rocklin, California, U.S.
- Height: 1.75 m (5 ft 9 in)
- Position: Midfielder

Team information
- Current team: Orange County SC
- Number: 8

Youth career
- 2009–2011: California Development Academy

College career
Years	Team	Apps	(Gls)
2011–2014	California Golden Bears		

Senior career*
Years	Team	Apps	(Gls)
2013	Austin Aztex	5	(1)
2014	San Jose Earthquakes U23	9	(1)
2015–2016	Portland Timbers 2	32	(1)
2017–2019	Reno 1868	85	(12)
2020–	Orange County SC	100	(2)
- * Club domestic league appearances and goals as of November 14, 2024

Seth Robert Casiple (born August 23, 1993) is an American soccer player who currently plays for Orange County SC in the USL Championship.

== Career ==
=== College and amateur ===
Casiple spent his entire college career at the University of California, Berkeley. He made a total of 74 appearances for the Golden Bears and tallied six goals and 27 assists.

He also played in the Premier Development League for Austin Aztex and San Jose Earthquakes U23.

=== Professional ===
On January 20, 2015, Casiple was the last player taken in the 2015 MLS SuperDraft. He was selected by the Portland Timbers in the fourth round (84th overall). However he was cut from camp during preseason and on March 26, he signed a professional contract with USL affiliate club Portland Timbers 2. He made his professional debut on May 19 and assisted on both of T2's goals in their 2–0 victory over PDL club Michigan Bucks in the third round of the 2015 Lamar Hunt U.S. Open Cup. He made his league debut three days later in a 2–0 defeat to Cascadia rivals Seattle Sounders FC 2.

On January 6, 2020, Casiple moved to USL Championship side Orange County SC.
