= Bryce Jamison =

American soccer player (born 2006)

Personal information
- Full name: Bryce Jamison
- Date of birth: January 6, 2006 (age 20)
- Place of birth: Atlanta, Georgia, United States
- Height: 6 ft 0 in (1.83 m)
- Position: Forward

Team information
- Current team: Colorado Spring Switchbacks on loan from Colorado Rapids
- Number: 11

Youth career
- Smyrna Impact United
- –2021: Atlanta United
- 2021–2022: Barça Residency Academy

Senior career*
| Years | Team | Apps | (Gls) |
| 2022–2025 | Orange County SC | 62 | (7) |
| 2025– | Colorado Rapids | 0 | (0) |
| 2025 | → Orange County SC (loan) | 22 | (2) |
| 2026 | → Colorado Rapids 2 (loan) | 22 | (2) |
| 2026– | → Colorado Springs Switchbacks (loan) | 10 | (0) |

International career^{‡}
| 2023 | United States U17 | 4 | (0) |
| 2023 | United States U18 | 3 | (0) |
| 2025– | United States U19 | 1 | (0) |
- * Club domestic league appearances and goals as of November 7, 2026 ‡ National team caps and goals as of June 10, 2025

Bryce Jamison (born January 6, 2006) is an American professional soccer player who plays as a forward for Colorado Spring Switchbacks FC in the USL Championship on loan from Major League Soccer club Colorado Rapids.

== Career ==
=== Youth ===
Jamison was born in Atlanta, Georgia, where he played youth soccer with Super Y League side Smyrna Impact United. He later went on to join the Atlanta United academy. Ahead of the club's 2021–22 season, Jamison made the move to the Barça Residency Academy in Arizona. Here he scored five goals in his first eight starts with the U-17 team. Jamison was moved up to the U-19 squad where he helped Barça win the MLS Next Southwest Division. He went on to finish with seven goals in 13 games with Barça's U-19s. In July he was named to the MLS Next All-Star Team.

=== Professional ===
On September 23, 2022, Jamison signed a professional multi-year contract with USL Championship side Orange County SC. He made his professional debut on September 24, 2022, appearing as a 90th–minute substitute against Pittsburgh Riverhounds. He scored his first professional goal on October 8, 2022, against El Paso Locomotive in a 2–1 loss.

On April 5, 2025, Jamison signed with Colorado Rapids on a three-year contract, where he was immediately loaned back to Orange County SC until the end of 2025.

In August 2026, Colorado Springs Switchbacks FC in the USL Championship announced they had acquired Jamison on loan from Colorado Rapids.

=== Personal life ===
Jamison was born in Atlanta, Georgia. He is currently located in Denver, CO.
