= Brian Iloski =

American soccer player (born 1995)

Personal information
- Full name: Brian Michael Iloski
- Date of birth: September 4, 1995 (age 31)
- Place of birth: Escondido, California, United States
- Height: 5 ft 7 in (1.70 m)
- Position: Midfielder

College career
Years	Team	Apps	(Gls)
2013–2017	UCLA Bruins	67	(13)

Senior career*
Years	Team	Apps	(Gls)
2016	San Diego Zest	2	(0)
2018–2019	Legia Warsaw	1	(0)
2018–2019	Legia Warsaw II	2	(0)
2018	→ Zemplín Michalovce (loan)	6	(0)
2019	LA Galaxy II	15	(2)
2020–2024	Orange County	104	(11)
- * Club domestic league appearances and goals as of November 14, 2024

Brian Michael Iloski (born September 4, 1995) is an American professional soccer player who plays as a midfielder for Orange County in the USL Championship.

== Club career ==
=== Legia Warsaw ===
Iloski originally was drafted by the Colorado Rapids, before joining Legia Warsaw for winter training camps in Florida and Spain in 2018. On 16 February that year, he signed a two-year contract with an option for a third year. Brian was also the first American to play for Legia Warsaw. Iloski debuted for Legia on March 11, 2018, being subbed in the second half stoppage time of a 3–1 win against Lechia Gdańsk.

=== LA Galaxy II ===
After parting ways with Legia Warsaw, Iloski went back to California and signed with the LA Galaxy reserve team on April 4, 2019.

=== Orange County SC ===
On February 21, 2020, Iloski joined USL Championship side Orange County SC.

== Career statistics ==
=== Club ===
As of March 11, 2018

Club	Season	League	League		National cup		Continental		Other		Total	
Club	Season	League	Apps	Goals	Apps	Goals	Apps	Goals	Apps	Goals	Apps	Goals
UCLA Bruins	2013	Pac-12	9	5	–		–		–		9	5
UCLA Bruins	2014	Pac-12	19	5	–		–		–		19	5
UCLA Bruins	2015	Pac-12	3	0	–		–		–		3	0
UCLA Bruins	2016	Pac-12	20	2	–		–		–		20	2
UCLA Bruins	2017	Pac-12	16	1	–		–		–		16	1
UCLA Bruins	Total		67	13	–		–		–		67	13
Legia Warsaw	2017–18	Ekstraklasa	1	0	0	0	0	0	0	0	1	0
Legia Warsaw	Total		1	0	0	0	0	0	0	0	1	0

== Personal life ==
Brian has two younger brothers, Milan Eric, who are also professional soccer players. Brian also has a younger sister who played volleyball in college. Their family are of Macedonian descent.

== Honors ==
Legia Warsaw

- Ekstraklasa: 2017–18
