= 2024 Hartford Athletic season =

Hartford Athletic 2024 soccer season

Hartford Athletic
2024 season
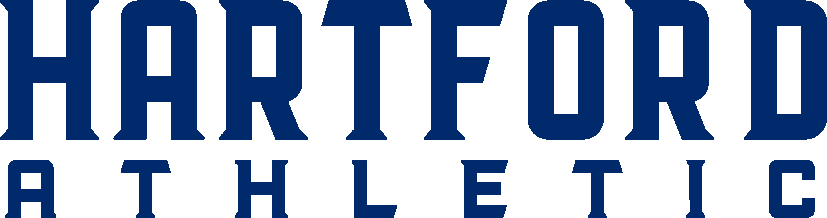
- Head coach: Brandon Burke
- Stadium: Trinity Health Stadium
- USL Championship: Conference: 10th Overall: 16th
- U.S. Open Cup: Third Rounds
- USL Cup: DNQ
- Top goalscorer: Mamadou Dieng (11 goals)
- Biggest win: 3-0 (September 14, against Miami FC)
- Biggest defeat: 0-6 (April 27, against Louisville City FC)

The 2024 Hartford Athletic season was the club's sixth season of existence and their sixth in the USL Championship, the second tier of American soccer.

Hartford Athletic also played in the U.S. Open Cup for the fourth time in club history, exiting in the third round.

== Squad ==
As of July 20, 2024

Note: Flags indicate national team as defined under FIFA eligibility rules; some limited exceptions apply. Players may hold more than one non-FIFA nationality.

No.	Pos.	Nation	Player
1	GK	USA	Greg Monroe
2	DF	MAR	Younes Boudadi
4	DF	JAM	Jordan Scarlett
5	DF	TRI	Triston Hodge
6	MF	COD	Beverly Makangila
7	FW	USA	Marcus Epps
10	MF	USA	Danny Barrera
11	FW	COD	Michee Ngalina
12	MF	GHA	Anderson Asiedu
15	DF	USA	Joe Farrell
17	FW	VIN	Kyle Edwards
18	MF	USA	Joe Schmidt
21	FW	USA	Griffin Thomas

No.	Pos.	Nation	Player
23	DF	GUF	Thomas Vancaeyezeele
24	DF	USA	Michael DeShields
27	DF	CMR	Pele Ousmanou
29	MF	SLE	Emmanuel Samadia
31	FW	JAM	Deshane Beckford
33	FW	SEN	Mamadou Dieng
37	FW	USA	Dantouma Toure (on loan from MLS Pool)
40	GK	BRA	Renan Ribeiro
43	MF	USA	Ian Shaul
44	GK	USA	Justin DiCarlo
94	MF	USA	Marlon Hairston
--	DF	USA	Agnaldo Germano
--	FW	USA	Kauan Ribeiro

1. USL Academy Contract

=== Out on loan ===
Note: Flags indicate national team as defined under FIFA eligibility rules; some limited exceptions apply. Players may hold more than one non-FIFA nationality.

No.	Pos.	Nation	Player
8	MF	CAN	Jay Chapman (on loan to Charleston Battery)
22	GK	USA	Brooks Thompson (on loan to Spokane Velocity)
77	FW	COD	Enoch Mushagalusa (on loan to Pittsburgh Riverhounds SC)

== Transfers ==
=== In ===
Pos	Player	Transferred from	Fee	Date	Source
GK	(Brazil) Renan Ribeiro	Al-Ahli	Free transfer	November 7, 2023	
MF	(Canada) Jay Chapman	Colorado Springs Switchbacks	Free transfer	November 27, 2023	
MF	(Sierra Leone) Emmanuel Samadia	Hapoel Rishon LeZion	Undisclosed	November 28, 2023	
DF	(French Guiana) Thomas Vancaeyezeele	Bassin d'Arcachon	Free transfer	November 30, 2023	
DF	(United States) Joe Farrell	Pittsburgh Riverhounds	Free transfer	December 4, 2023	
MF	(United States) Joe Schmidt	Charleston Battery	Free transfer	December 5, 2023	
DF	(United States) Rece Buckmaster	Memphis 901	Free Transfer	December 7, 2023	
MF	(Ghana) Anderson Asiedu	Birmingham Legion	Free transfer	December 14, 2023	
FW	(United States) Marcus Epps	FC Tulsa	Free transfer	December 19, 2023	
FW	(Democratic Republic of the Congo) Enoch Mushagalusa	Louisville City	Free transfer	December 20, 2023	
FW	(Jamaica) Deshane Beckford	Colorado Springs Switchbacks	Free transfer	January 2, 2024	
FW	(Jamaica) Romario Williams	Colorado Springs Switchbacks	Free transfer	January 4, 2024	
DF	(Jamaica) Jordan Scarlett	Louisville City	Free transfer	January 8, 2024	
GK	(United States) Brooks Thompson	Philadelphia Union II	Free transfer	January 11, 2024	
MF	(United States) Marlon Hairston	Columbus Crew	Free transfer	January 18, 2024	
GK	(United States) Greg Monroe	Austin FC II	Free transfer	January 23, 2024	
FW	(Norway) Skage Simonsen	Detroit City	Undisclosed	January 24, 2024	
MF	(United States) Ian Shaul	Portland Timbers 2	Free Transfer	January 25, 2024	
GK	(United States) Justin DiCarlo	Academy	Academy	February 2, 2024	
DF	(United States) Joey Akpunonu	FC Cincinnati	Loan	February 6, 2024	
DF	(Cameroon) Pele Ousmanou	Elite Falcons FC	Undisclosed	February 7, 2024	
FW	(Democratic Republic of the Congo) Michee Ngalina	Göztepe	Undisclosed	February 8, 2024	
FW	(Senegal) Mamadou Dieng	Elite Falcons FC	Undisclosed	February 13, 2024	
GK	(United States) Paul Walters	FC Cincinnati	Loan	March 8, 2024	
FW	(United States) Dantouma Toure	MLS Pool	Loan	June 13, 2024	
DF	(Morocco) Younes Boudadi	Indy Eleven	Undisclosed	June 14, 2024	
DF	(United States) Michael DeShields	Pittsburgh Riverhounds	Undisclosed	June 19, 2024	
FW	(United States) Griffin Thomas	AC Connecticut	Free Transfer	September 6, 2024	
DF	(United States) Agnaldo Germano	Academy	Academy	September 6, 2024	
DF	(United States) Kauan Ribeiro	Academy	Academy	September 6, 2024	

=== Out ===
Pos	Player	Transferred To	Fee	Date	Source
DF	(United States) Matthew Sheldon	Detroit City FC	Undisclosed	January 24, 2024	
FW	(Norway) Skage Simonsen	Free Agent	Released	March 7, 2024	
GK	(United States) Brooks Thompson	Spokane Velocity FC	Loan	May 15, 2024	
GK	(United States) Paul Walters	FC Cincinnati	Loan End	May 17, 2024	
FW	(Jamaica) Romario Williams	Indy Eleven	Undisclosed	June 14, 2024	
FW	(Democratic Republic of the Congo) Enoch Mushagalusa	Pittsburgh Riverhounds	Loan	June 19, 2024	
DF	(United States) Rece Buckmaster	San Antonio FC	Undisclosed	July 15, 2024	
MF	(Canada) Jay Chapman	Charleston Battery	Loan	August 1, 2024	
DF	(United States) Joey Akpunonu	FC Cincinnati	Loan End	August 10, 2024	
FW	(Democratic Republic of the Congo) Enoch Mushagalusa	Valletta	Undisclosed	August 31, 2024	

== Season competitions ==
=== Exhibitions ===
February 14	Hartford Athletic	2-2	Colorado Rapids	Bradenton, Florida
		Report

February 17	North Carolina Tar Heels	1-2	Hartford Athletic	Chapel Hill, North Carolina
		Report

February 23	Hartford Athletic	6-2	New York Red Bulls II	Windsor, Connecticut
1:00 PM EST	4'; 8'; 12'; 15'; 44'; 50'	Report	25'; 75'	Stadium: Day Hill Dome

March 1	Hartford Athletic	3-3	Philadelphia Union II	Hartford, Connecticut
1:00 PM EST	8'; 11'; 38'	Report	6'; 37' (pen.); 73'	Stadium: Trinity Health Stadium

March 16	Hartford Athletic	3-1	Boston College Eagles	Hartford, Connecticut
		Report		Stadium: Trinity Health Stadium

May 21	Hartford Athletic	2-1	Long Island Rough Riders	Hartford, Connecticut
11:00 am	Dieng 69'; Epps 78'	Report	34' Puig	Stadium: Trinity Health Stadium; Attendance: 3,000

=== USL Championship ===
==== Standings ====
Pos	Team	Pld	W	L	T	GF	GA	GD	Pts	Qualification
8	North Carolina FC	34	13	12	9	54	43	+11	48	Playoffs
9	Birmingham Legion FC	34	13	15	6	44	51	−7	45	
10	Hartford Athletic	34	12	14	8	39	52	−13	44	
11	Loudoun United FC	34	11	14	9	44	39	+5	42	
12	Miami FC	34	3	29	2	26	89	−63	11	

Source: USL Championship Standings
Rules for classification: 1) head-to-head points; 2) head-to-head goal differential; 3) points-per game within conference; 4) total wins; 5) total goal differential; 6) total goals scored; 7) points earned against top four Conference finishers; 8) disciplinary points; 9) coin toss or drawing of lots

==== Matches ====
March 9 1	El Paso Locomotive	0-1	Hartford Athletic	El Paso, Texas
10:00 PM EST	Rose (yellow card) 32'; Cavillo (yellow card) 90+1'	Report	Williams 13', (yellow card) 63'; Hodge (yellow card) 41'; Vancaeyezeele (yellow card) 86'; Makangila (yellow card) 90+5'	Stadium: Southwest University Park; Attendance: 6,111; Referee: Brandon Stevis

March 23 2	Hartford Athletic	1-0	Birmingham Legion FC	Hartford, Connecticut
2:00 PM EST	Ngalina 23'; Asiedu (yellow card) 60'	Report		Stadium: Trinity Health Stadium; Attendance: 2,969; Referee: Greg Dopka

March 29 3	North Carolina FC	2-0	Hartford Athletic	Cary, North Carolina
7:00 PM EST	Perez 25' (pen.); Anderson 35'; Batista (yellow card) 44'; Rafa (yellow card) 71'; Maldonado (yellow card) 80'; Servania (yellow card) 90+3'	Report	Asiedu (yellow card) 25'; Chapman (yellow card) 31', (goal) 72'; Beckford (yellow card) 69'; Mushagalusa (yellow card) 80'	Stadium: WakeMed Soccer Park; Attendance: 1,465; Referee: Thomas Snyder

April 6 4	Hartford Athletic	3-2	Miami FC	Hartford, Connecticut
2:00 PM EST	Farrell (yellow card) 33'; Williams (yellow card) 41', (goal) 55'; Beckford 45'; Ngalina (yellow card) 45+2'; Walters (yellow card) 72'; Mushagalusa 90+1'	Report	Genzano (yellow card) 22'; Mitrano (yellow card) 40'; Cardona (yellow card) 62'; Cabral 76'; Luis Pedro (yellow card) 86'; Farrell (OG) 90+3'	Stadium: Trinity Health Stadium; Attendance: 3,394; Referee: Abdou Ndiaye

April 20 5	Hartford Athletic	1-3	San Antonio FC	Hartford, Connecticut
5:00 PM EST	Epps 27'; Asiedu (yellow card) 41'; Hodge (yellow card) 45+3'; Schmidt (yellow card) 75'; Farrell (yellow card) 84'	Report	Chol 7'; Boni (yellow card) 15'; Haakenson (yellow card) 44'; Lacey (yellow card) 66'; Akpunonu (OG) 78'; Solignac 85' (pen.)	Stadium: Trinity Health Stadium; Attendance: 4,880; Referee: Jeremy Scheer

April 27 6	Louisville City FC	6-0	Hartford Athletic	Louisville, Kentucky
10:00 PM EST	Wynder 5'; Perez 12'; McFadden 32'; Gonzalez 67'; Totsch (yellow card) 81'; Serrano 83'; Showunmi 90+3'	Report	Epps (yellow card) 10'; Buckmaster (yellow card) 37'; Hodge (yellow card) 57'; Asiedu (yellow card) 78'	Stadium: Lynn Family Stadium; Attendance: 10,887; Referee: Ricardo Fierro

May 4 7	Charleston Battery	1-0	Hartford Athletic	Mount Pleasant, South Carolina
5:00 PM EST	Markanich 12'; Dossantos (yellow card) 36'; Ycaza (yellow card) 73'	Report	Hodge (yellow card) 19'; Beckford (yellow card) 40'; Chapman (yellow card) 48'	Stadium: Patriots Point Soccer Complex; Attendance: 3,785; Referee: Matthew Thompson

May 11 8	Hartford Athletic	0-2	Colorado Springs Switchbacks FC	Hartford, Connecticut
7:00 PM EST	Farrell (yellow card) 29'; Scarlett (yellow card) 45+3'; Dieng (yellow card) 77'; Chapman (yellow card) 79'	Report	Santos (yellow card) 14'; Hanya 24'; Foster (yellow card) 59'; Damus 81' (pen.); Echevarria (yellow card) 86'	Stadium: Trinity Health Stadium; Attendance: 5,500; Referee: Lorenzo Hernandez

May 18 9	Indy Eleven	4-1	Hartford Athletic	Indianapolis, Indiana
7:00 PM EST	Blake 3' (pen.); Williams (yellow card) 11', (goal) 58'; Diz Pe (yellow card) 15'; Ofeimu 45+2'; Martínez 54'	Report	Ngalina 80'; Vancaeyezeele (yellow card) 82'	Stadium: Michael A. Carroll Stadium; Attendance: 10,021; Referee: Elton Garcia

May 24 10	Hartford Athletic	2-1	Monterey Bay FC	Hartford, Connecticut
	Ngalina 33'; Beckford 50'; Farrell (yellow card) 55'; Williams (yellow card) 90'; Hodge (yellow card) 90+4'	Report	Rebollar 18'; Guzmán (yellow card) 55'; Lara (yellow card) 61'; Fehr (yellow card) 68'; Robinson (yellow card) 89'	Stadium: Trinity Health Stadium; Attendance: 4,983; Referee: Ricardo Montero

June 1 11	Hartford Athletic	1-1	Rhode Island FC	Hartford, Connecticut
07:00 PM EST	Farrell 24'	Report	Doyle 4', (yellow card) 86'	Stadium: Trinity Health Stadium; Attendance: 5,500; Referee: Luis Arroyo

June 8 12	New Mexico United	1-0	Hartford Athletic	Albuquerque, New Mexico
7:00 PM EST	Hurst (yellow card) 35'; Bruce 86'	Report	Vancaeyezeele (yellow card) 2'; Monroe (yellow card) 67'; Buckmaster (yellow card) 71'; Mushagalusa (yellow card) 90+3'	Stadium: Isotopes Park; Attendance: 10,884; Referee: Calin Radosav

June 15 13	Hartford Athletic	2-0	Pittsburgh Riverhounds	Hartford, Connecticut
7:00 PM EST	Michee Ngalina 6', 16'; Vancaeyezeele (yellow card) 45+1'; Hodge (yellow card) 65'; Makangila (yellow card) 90+1'	Report	Etou (yellow card) 39'; Osumanu (yellow card) 63'; Hogan (yellow card) 90+4'	Stadium: Trinity Health Stadium; Attendance: 4.747; Referee: Joshua Encarnación

June 21 14	Hartford Athletic	0-1	Tampa Bay Rowdies	Hartford, Connecticut
7:30 PM EST	Makangila (yellow card) 9' (yellow-red card) 43'	Report	Dennis (yellow card) 2'; Farr (yellow card) 66'; Arteaga 87' (pen.)	Stadium: Trinity Health Stadium; Attendance: 5,500; Referee: Greg Dopka

June 29 15	Sacramento Republic FC	1-0	Hartford Athletic	Sacramento, California
7:00 PM EST	Portillo (yellow card) 22'; Amann (yellow card) 70'; Herrera 87'	Report	Barrera (yellow card) 36'; Asiedu (yellow card) 65'; Ribeiro (yellow card) 79'	Stadium: Heart Health Park; Attendance: 9,249; Referee: Muhammad Hassan

July 3 17	Loudoun United FC	3-0	Hartford Athletic	Leesburg, Virginia
7:00 PM	Leggett 25'; McCabe (yellow card) 38'; Ryan 45'+1', 46'; Skundrich (yellow card) 55'; Tingey (yellow card) 71'	Report	Scarlett (yellow card) 20'; Farrell (yellow card) 23'; Ribeiro (yellow card) 71'	Stadium: Segra Field; Attendance: 3,789; Referee: John Matto

July 12 17	Hartford Athletic	2-2	Charleston Battery	Hartford, Connecticut
7:30 EDT	Mamadou 20'; Chapman (yellow card) 36'; Ngalina 43' (yellow card) 90'+5'; Ribeiro (yellow card) 50' (yellow-red card) 50'; Epps (yellow card) 80'	Report	Crawford (yellow card) 37'; Ycaza (yellow card) 41'; Segbres (yellow card) 59'; Dossantos 70'; Markanich 90'	Stadium: Trinity Health Stadium; Attendance: 4,809; Referee: Elijio Arreguin

July 20 18	Pittsburgh Riverhounds	3-1	Hartford Athletic	Pittsburgh, Pennsylvania
7:00 PM EST	Kizza 5' (pen.); Blackstock 20'; Johnson 21'; Osumanu (yellow card) 46'	Report	Beckford (yellow card) 4'; Akpunonu (yellow card) 15'; Mamadou 34'; Boudadi (yellow card) 44'; Epps (yellow card) 86'	Stadium: Highmark Stadium; Attendance: 5,602; Referee: Sergii Demianchuk

July 26 19	Hartford Athletic	0-0	Phoenix Rising	Hartford, Connecticut
7:30 PM	Dieng (yellow card) 74'	Report	Wyke (yellow card) 9'; Torres (yellow card) 45+2'; John (yellow card) 68'	Stadium: Trinity Health Stadium; Attendance: 5,103; Referee: Gerald Flores

July 31 20	Hartford Athletic	1-0	Detroit City FC	Hartford, Connecticut
7:30 PM	Beckford 23'; Barrera (yellow card) 65'; Akpunonu (yellow card) 77'; Dieng (yellow card) 90'; Hairston (yellow card) 90'+1'	Report	Williams (yellow card) 90'+1'	Stadium: Trinity Health Stadium; Attendance: 4,675; Referee: Matthew Corrigan

August 3 21	Birmingham Legion FC	2-2	Hartford Athletic	Birmingham, Alabama
7:30 PM	Martínez 32'; McCartney 38'; Paterson (yellow card) 47'	Report	Mamadou 72'; Ngalina 87' (pen.)	Stadium: Protective Stadium; Attendance: 4,017; Referee: Corbyn May

August 10 22	Rhode Island FC	3-0	Hartford Athletic	Smithfield, RI
7:30 PM	Holstad (yellow card) 22'; Stoneman 29'; Nodarse 49'; Fuson (yellow card) 52'; Yao (yellow card) 76'; Brito 90+1'	Report	Farrell (yellow card) 66'; Samadia (yellow card) 69'; Boudadi (yellow card) 77'	Stadium: Beirne Stadium; Attendance: 5,252; Referee: Joshua Encarnación

August 17 23	Hartford Athletic	2-1	Las Vegas Lights FC	Hartford, Connecticut
7:00 PM	Dieng 25'; Boudadi (yellow card) 43'; Ngalina 53'; Makangila (yellow card) 90+1'	Report	Doody (yellow card) 9'; Bennett 10'; Nigro (yellow card) 13'; Jabang (yellow card) 37'; Gyau (yellow card) 63'	Stadium: Trinity Health Stadium; Attendance: 4,933; Referee: Matthew Thompson

August 24 24	Hartford Athletic	2-1	Louisville City FC	Hartford, Connecticut
7:00 PM	Dieng 48', 84'; Farrell (yellow card) 69'; Hairston (yellow card) 90+2'	Report	Perez (red card); Dia 37'	Stadium: Trinity Health Stadium; Attendance: 5,500; Referee: John Griggs

August 31 25	Detroit City FC	1-1	Hartford Athletic	Hamtramck, Michigan
7:00 PM	Morris 21'; Amoo-Mensah (yellow card) 24'; Murphy (yellow card) 54'; Bryant (yellow card) 75'	Report	Dieng 17'; Samadia (yellow card) 42'; Hodge (yellow card) 65'; Farrell (yellow card) 88'	Stadium: Keyworth Stadium; Attendance: 6,047; Referee: Servando Berna Rico

September 7 26	Hartford Athletic	0-0	Indy Eleven	Hartford, Connecticut
7:00 PM		Report	Blake (yellow card) 59'; White (yellow card) 72'	Stadium: Trinity Health Stadium; Attendance: 5,283; Referee: Thomas Snyder

September 11 27	Memphis 901 FC	0-0	Hartford Athletic	Memphis, Tennessee
8:00 PM	Cissoko (yellow card) 64'	Report	Asiedu (yellow card) 72' (yellow-red card) 90'	Stadium: AutoZone Park; Attendance: 3,013; Referee: Elvis Osmanovic

September 14 28	Miami FC	0-3	Hartford Athletic	Miami, Florida
7:00 PM	Mitrano (yellow card) 77'; López (yellow card) 87'	Report	Mamadou 50', 81'; Toure (yellow card) 64'; Farrell 73'	Stadium: Pitbull Stadium; Attendance: 1,196; Referee: Nabil Bensalah

September 21 29	Hartford Athletic	2-0	Oakland Roots SC	Hartford, Connecticut
	Hairston 20'; Scarlett (red card) 51'; Edwards 77'	Report	Donasiyano (yellow card) 11'; Margvelashvili (yellow card) 40'; Sinisterra (yellow card) 46'	Stadium: Trinity Health Stadium; Attendance: 5,500; Referee: Alyssa Nichols

September 28 30	Tampa Bay Rowdies	v	Hartford Athletic
		Report
Note: Match postponed due to Hurricane Helene

October 5 31	Hartford Athletic	0-2	Loudoun United	Hartford, Connecticut
7:00 PM	Makangila (yellow card) 73'; Vancaeyezeele (yellow card) 77'; Mamadou (yellow card) 90'+9'; Farrell (yellow card) 90'+9'	Report	Bidois (yellow card) 49'; Valot (yellow card) 56'; Tingey 74'; Leggett 83'; ElMedkhar (yellow card) 90'; Aboukoura (yellow card) 90'+9'; Leerman (yellow card) 90'+9'	Stadium: Trinity Health Stadium; Attendance: 5,500; Referee: Joe Surgan

October 12 32	Hartford Athletic	4-3	North Carolina FC	Hartford, Connecticut
7:30 PM	Barrera 9', 33'; Makangila 56'; Mamadou 63'; Farrell (yellow card) 89'; Ribeiro (yellow card) 90'+4'	Report	Conway 74'; da Costa 83'; Mentzingen (yellow card) 85'; Malou (yellow card) 90'+1'	Stadium: Trinity Health Stadium; Attendance: 5,500; Referee: Adam Kilpatrick

October 19 33	FC Tulsa	1-2	Hartford Athletic	Tulsa, Oklahoma
5:00 PM	Stojanovic 10' (pen.); Bettache (yellow card) 89'; Bell (yellow card) 90'+8'	Report	Souahy 24' (o.g.); Edwards 80'	Stadium: ONEOK Field; Attendance: 2,573; Referee: Elton García

October 23 30	Tampa Bay Rowdies	2-2	Hartford Athletic	Bradenton, Florida
7:30 PM	Fernandes 21'; Moon (yellow card) 23'; Jennings (yellow card) 45'+5' (goal) 64'; Bender (yellow card) 87'; Arteaga (yellow card) 90'+6'	Report	Epps 14'; Mamadou 45'+6'; Farrell (yellow card) 53'; Boudadi (yellow card) 90'	Stadium: IMG Academy Soccer Stadium; Attendance: 223
Note: Match postponed due to Hurricane Helene

October 26 34	Orange County SC	3-2	Hartford Athletic	Irvine, California
7:00 PM	Hegardt (yellow card) 40'; Doghman 53', 58'; Miles (yellow card) 73'; Amang 86'	Report	Vancaeyezeele (yellow card) 9'; Ngalina (yellow card) 17'; Epps 55' (yellow card) 73'; Edwards 83'	Stadium: Championship Soccer Stadium; Attendance: 4,729; Referee: Sergii Demianchuk

=== U.S. Open Cup ===
Hartford Athletic entered the U.S. Open Cup in the third round.

April 17 Third Round	Hartford Athletic (Connecticut)	2-3 (a.e.t.)	(New York (state)) NYCFC II	Hartford, Connecticut
7:00pm EDT	Williams 81' (pen.), (yellow card) 90+9'; Beckford 92', (red card) 120+2'; Schmidt (yellow card) 114'; Asiedu (yellow card) 119'; Epps (red card) 120+1'	Report	Calheira 63', 99'; Carrizo (yellow card) 71', (goal) 109'; Hauschild (yellow card) 79'; Elias (yellow card) 90+5'; Rozhansky (yellow card) 120'; Tiao (red card) 120+2'	Stadium: Trinity Health Stadium; Referee: Christian Centeno
