= 2025 Hartford Athletic season =

Hartford Athletic
2025 season
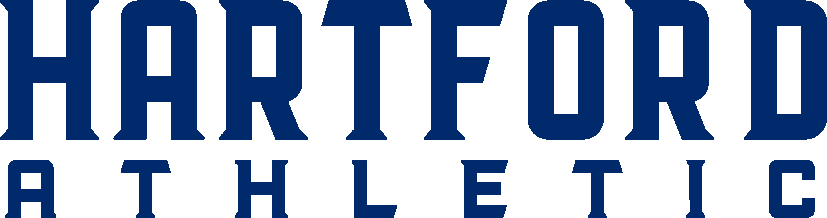
- Head coach: Brendan Burke
- Stadium: Trinity Health Stadium
- USL Championship: Conference: 5th
- U.S. Open Cup: Second round
- USL Cup: Champions
- USLC Playoffs: Conference Quarter-Finals
| Home colors | Away colors |

The 2025 Hartford Athletic season was the club's seventh season of existence and their seventh in the USL Championship, the second tier of American soccer.

Hartford Athletic also played in the U.S. Open Cup for the fifth time in club history and the USL Cup for the first time, defeating Sacramento Republic FC in the final to win their first competitive trophy in the latter.

== Transfers ==
=== In ===
| Pos | Player | Transferred from | Fee | Date | Source |
|---|---|---|---|---|---|
| FW | (Mexico) Jonathan Jiménez | NYCFC II | Free transfer | December 4, 2024 | |
| MF | (Argentina) Samuel Careaga | (Argentina) Club Atlético Lanús | Loan | January 6, 2025 | |
| DF | (Cuba) Adrián Diz | Indy Eleven | Free transfer | January 27, 2025 | |
| FW | (Nigeria) Adewale Obalola | (Lithuania) FK Ekranas | Free transfer | January 30, 2025 | |
| FW | (United States) Sebastian Anderson | Colorado Rapids | Free transfer | February 6, 2025 | |
| DF | (United States) TJ Presthus | Yale Bulldogs | Free transfer | February 12, 2025 | |
| GK | (Cameroon) Antony Siaha | Indy Eleven | Free transfer | February 25, 2025 | |
| MF | (Guinea-Bissau) Junior Moreira | (Mexico) Cancún F.C. | Undisclosed | February 26, 2025 | |
| FW | (United States) Jack Panayotou | New England Revolution | Loan | April 25, 2025 | |
| MF | (The Gambia) Baboucarr Njie | Free agent | Signing | July 29, 2025 | |
| MF | (United States) Owen Presthus | Columbus Crew | Loan | August 15, 2025 | |
| GK | (United States) John Berner | Free agent | Signing | August 27, 2025 | |

=== Out ===
| Pos | Player | Transferred To | Fee | Date | Source |
|---|---|---|---|---|---|
| MF | (Ghana) Anderson Asiedu | Free Agent | End of contract | December 4, 2024 | |
| MF | (United States) Danny Barrera | Free Agent | End of contract | December 4, 2024 | |
| FW | (United States) Tyler Freeman | Carolina Core FC | Loan return | December 4, 2024 | |
| GK | (United States) Greg Monroe | Free Agent | End of contract | December 4, 2024 | |
| MF | (United States) Joe Schmidt | Retired | End of contract | December 4, 2024 | |
| MF | (French Guiana) Thomas Vancaeyezeele | Tampa Bay Rowdies | End of contract | December 4, 2024 | |
| DF | (Trinidad and Tobago) Triston Hodge | North Carolina | End of contract | December 4, 2024 | |
| DF | (Morocco) Younes Boudadi | Las Vegas Lights | End of contract | December 4, 2024 | |
| FW | (United States) Marcus Epps | Lexington SC | Free transfer | December 12, 2024 | |
| MF | (Canada) Jay Chapman | Detroit City FC | Transfer | February 3, 2025 | |
| GK | (Brazil) Renan Ribeiro | Free Agent | Mutual termination | February 7, 2025 | |
| FW | (Senegal) Mamadou Dieng | Minnesota United | $300,000 | August 22, 2025 | |
| FW | (Jamaica) Deshane Beckford | Westchester SC | Loan | August 29, 2025 | |

== Competitions ==
=== Friendlies ===
| February 3 | New York Red Bulls | 2–0 | Hartford Athletic | Whippany, New Jersey |
| | Gjengaar; Sofo | Report | | Stadium: Red Bulls Training Facility |

| February 15 | New England Revolution | 2–0 | Hartford Athletic | Foxborough, Massachusetts |
| 12:30 pm ET | Campana 40' Urruti 87' | Report | | Stadium: Gillette Stadium |

| February 19 | Hartford Athletic | Cancelled | Rhode Island FC | Windsor, Connecticut |
| | | Report | | Stadium: Day Hill Dome |
Note: No score was reported

| February 28 | Hartford Athletic | 2–1 | New York Red Bulls II | Hartford, Connecticut |
| | 11'; 22' | Report | 83' Trialist | Stadium: Trinity Health Stadium |

| March 1 | Hartford Athletic | 0–4 | Portland Hearts of Pine | Hartford, Connecticut |
| | | Report | Trialist; Varela; Jones-Riley; Wright | Stadium: Trinity Health Stadium |

=== USL Championship ===
==== Standings ====
| Pos | Team | Pld | W | L | T | GF | GA | GD | Pts | Qualification |
|---|---|---|---|---|---|---|---|---|---|---|
| 3 | North Carolina FC | 30 | 13 | 11 | 6 | 40 | 39 | +1 | 45 | Playoffs |
| 4 | Pittsburgh Riverhounds SC (C) | 30 | 12 | 10 | 8 | 32 | 28 | +4 | 44 (Note: Pittsburgh Riverhounds SC are ahead of Hartford Athletic on head-to-head points. PGH 6, HFD 0.) | Playoffs |
| 5 | Hartford Athletic | 30 | 13 | 12 | 5 | 48 | 36 | +12 | 44 | Playoffs |
| 6 | Loudoun United FC | 30 | 12 | 12 | 6 | 45 | 48 | −3 | 42 | Playoffs |
| 7 | Rhode Island FC | 30 | 10 | 12 | 8 | 29 | 28 | +1 | 38 | Playoffs |

Source: USL Championship Standings
Rules for classification: 1) head-to-head points; 2) head-to-head goal differential; 3) points-per-game within conference; 4) total wins; 5) total goal differential; 6) total goals scored; 7) points earned against top four Conference finishers; 8) disciplinary points; 9) coin toss or drawing of lots
(C) Champions

==== Matches ====
| March 8 1 | Lexington SC | 2–0 | Hartford Athletic | Lexington, Kentucky |
| 7:00 pm ET | Hafferty 10'; Goldthorp 80' | Report | Samadia (red card) 90+3' | Stadium: Lexington SC Stadium; Attendance: 5,025; Referee: Nabil Bensalah |

| March 22 2 | Pittsburgh Riverhounds SC | 1–0 | Hartford Athletic | Pittsburgh, Pennsylvania |
| 7:00 pm ET | Griffin 76' | Report | | Stadium: Highmark Stadium; Attendance: 4,026; Referee: Brandon Stevis |

| March 29 3 | Hartford Athletic | 1–2 | El Paso Locomotive FC | Hartford, Connecticut |
| 2:00 pm ET | Dieng 29' | Report | 10' Avila; 86' Ackwei | Stadium: Trinity Health Stadium; Attendance: 4,400; Referee: Atahan Yaya |

| April 5 4 | Loudoun United FC | 2–0 | Hartford Athletic | Leesburg, Virginia |
| | | Report | | Stadium: Segra Field; Attendance: 1,517; Referee: Corbyn May |

| April 19 6 | Hartford Athletic | 1–0 | Birmingham Legion FC | Hartford, Connecticut |
| | Beckford 71' | Report | | Stadium: Trinity Health Stadium; Attendance: 4,034; Referee: Elvis Osmanovic |

| May 3 7 | Charleston Battery | 4-2 | Hartford Athletic | Mount Pleasant, South Carolina |
| 17:00 EDT (UTC-04:00) | Jennings 24' (p) David Torres 38' 64' Houssou 56' | Report | Scarlett 5' Ngalina 62' (p) | Stadium: Patriots Point Soccer Complex; Attendance: 4,288 |

| May 10 8 | Hartford Athletic | 0-0 | Detroit City FC | Hartford, Connecticut |
| | | Report | | Stadium: Trinity Health Stadium; Attendance: 5,304 |

| May 17 9 | Hartford Athletic | 1-1 | Louisville City FC | Hartford, Connecticut |
| | Edwards 88' | Report | Goodrum 39' | Stadium: Trinity Health Stadium; Attendance: 4,749 |

| May 28 10 | Indy Eleven | 4-4 | Hartford Athletic | Indianapolis, Indiana |
| 19:00 EDT (UTC-04:00) | Ofeimu 13' Williams 45+2', 90+3' Blake 46' | Report | Edwards 26' (p), 32' Scarlett 42' Dieng 46' | Stadium: IU Michael A. Carroll Track & Soccer Stadium; Attendance: 9,056; Referee: Joshua Encarnación |

| June 7 11 | Hartford Athletic | 0-1 | North Carolina FC | Hartford, Connecticut |
| | Farrell (yellow card) 64' (yellow-red card) 68' | Report | Dolabella 90+4' | Stadium: Trinity Health Stadium; Attendance: 4,320; Referee: Edson Carvajal |

| June 14 12 | Hartford Athletic | 1–2 | Charleston Battery | Hartford, Connecticut |
| | Presthus 80' | Report | Myers 7'; Landry 50' | Stadium: Trinity Health Stadium; Attendance: 4,610; Referee: Matthew Corrigan |

| June 20 13 | Hartford Athletic | 3–0 | Loudoun United FC | Hartford, Connecticut |
| 7:30 PM EDT | Dieng 16'; Edwards 43' 56' | Report | | Stadium: Trinity Health Stadium; Attendance: 5,500; Referee: Elijio Arreguin |

| July 12 14 | Detroit City FC | 1–2 | Hartford Athletic | Hamtramck, Michigan |
| | | Report | | Stadium: Keyworth Stadium; Attendance: 6,529; Referee: Trevor Wiseman |

| July 16 15 | Hartford Athletic | 0–1 | Tampa Bay Rowdies | Hartford, Connecticut |
| | | Report | | Stadium: Trinity Health Stadium; Attendance: 5,500 |

| July 19 16 | Rhode Island FC | 0–0 | Hartford Athletic | Pawtucket, Rhode Island |
| | | Report | | Stadium: Centreville Bank Stadium; Attendance: 10,619 |

| July 30 17 | Hartford Athletic | 4–0 | New Mexico United | Hartford, Connecticut |
| | Dieng 17', 24'; Ngalina 26'; Edwards 82' | Report | | Stadium: Trinity Health Stadium; Attendance: 4,151; Referee: Elton García |

| August 6 18 | Hartford Athletic | 2–0 | Miami FC | Hartford, Connecticut |
| | Moreira 46'; Dieng 73' (pen.) | Report | Akinyode (red card) 70' | Stadium: Trinity Health Stadium; Attendance: 5,365; Referee: Thomas Snyder |

| August 9 19 | Birmingham Legion FC | 1–4 | Hartford Athletic | Birmingham, Alabama |
| | Martínez 90+5' | Report | Dieng 27' (pen.), 29'; Edwards 90+1'; Obalola 90+3' | Stadium: Protective Stadium; Attendance: 5,007; Referee: Servando Berna Rico |

| August 16 20 | Hartford Athletic | 1–1 | FC Tulsa | Hartford, Connecticut |
| | Edwards 46' | Report | Farrell 45+7' (o.g.) | Stadium: Trinity Health Stadium; Referee: Abdou Ndiaye |

| August 23 21 | Hartford Athletic | 3−0 | Rhode Island FC | Hartford, Connecticut |
| 7:00 pm | Careaga 5' Edwards 73' Presthus 89' | Report | Sanchez (red card) | Stadium: Trinity Health Stadium; Attendance: 5,500; Referee: Elvis Osmanovic |

| August 30 22 | North Carolina FC | 2–3 | Hartford Athletic | Cary, North Carolina |
| 7:30 PM | Anderson 34'; Somersall 80' | Report | Careaga 5'; Hodge 86' (o.g.); Diz Pe 90+3' | Stadium: WakeMed Soccer Park; Referee: Amin Hadzic |

| September 3 5 | Hartford Athletic | 0–2 | Indy Eleven | Hartford, Connecticut |
| 7:30 PM | | Report | Blake 3'; Foster 76'; Williams (yellow card) 77' | Stadium: Trinity Health Stadium; Attendance: 4,966; Referee: Matthew Thompson |
Note: Match was originally scheduled for April 12 but was postponed due to weather and field conditions.

| September 6 23 | Miami FC | 0–1 | Hartford Athletic | Miami, Florida |
| 7:30 PM | | Report | Panayotou 54' | Stadium: Pitbull Stadium; Attendance: 1,202; Referee: Muhammad Hassan |

| September 13 24 | Monterey Bay FC | 0–4 | Hartford Athletic | Seaside, California |
| | | Report | Panayotou 24'; Edwards 85', 90+2'; Anderson 90+4' | Stadium: Cardinale Stadium; Attendance: 3,132; Referee: Ekaterina Koroleva |

| September 20 25 | Hartford Athletic | 1-2 | Pittsburgh Riverhounds SC | Hartford, Connecticut |
| | Diz Pe 11' | Report | Ahl 3'; Boone 89' | Stadium: Trinity Health Stadium |
Note: The game was abandoned during stoppage time after allegedly racially offensive language from a Riverhounds player to Marlon Hairston

| September 27 26 | Colorado Springs Switchbacks | 0–2 | Hartford Athletic | Colorado Springs, Colorado |
| | | Report | Obalola 41'; Panayotou 51' | Stadium: Weidner Field; Attendance: 7,006; Referee: Brad Jensen |

| October 7 27 | Oakland Roots SC | 1–3 | Hartford Athletic | Oakland, California |
| 10:00 PM | Wilson 31' | Report | Belluz 56'; Edwards 64'; Makangila 90+5' | Stadium: Oakland Coliseum; Attendance: 5,716; Referee: Alex Billeter |
Note: Match was originally scheduled for October but was postponed due Hartford's participation in the 2025 USL Cup final.

| October 11 28 | Hartford Athletic | 3–2 | Sacramento Republic FC | Hartford, Connecticut |
| 7:00 PM | Anderson 18'; Ngalina 38'; Jiménez 90+4' | Report | Gurr 45+3'; Wanner 50'; Edwards (yellow card) 84' (yellow-red card) 90+8' | Stadium: Trinity Health Stadium; Attendance: 4,558; Referee: Brandon Stevis |

| October 18 29 | Tampa Bay Rowdies | 3−2 | Hartford Athletic | St. Petersburg, Florida |
| 7:30 PM EDT | Arteaga 8'; Pacius 25'; Méndez 56' | Report | Ngalina 45+2', 90+2' | Stadium: Al Lang Stadium; Attendance: 4,527; Referee: Elton García |

| October 25 30 | Louisville City FC | 1–0 | Hartford Athletic | Louisville, Kentucky |
| 7:30 PM | Goodrum 39' | Report | | Stadium: Lynn Family Stadium; Attendance: 9,527; Referee: Atahan Yaya |

==== USL Championship playoffs ====
As the fifth seed in the Eastern Conference, Hartford clinched a playoff position, being matched up away against the Pittsburgh Riverhounds SC. Playing away in Pittsburgh, Hartford Athletic's season came to an end, losing in a penalty shootout to the Riverhounds 4–2, following a scoreless match.

| November 1, 2025 East | Pittsburgh Riverhounds SC | 0–0 (a.e.t.) (4–2 p) | Hartford Athletic | Pittsburgh, Pennsylvania |
| 6:30 PM ET | | Report | | Stadium: Highmark Stadium; Attendance: 4,932; Referee: Elijio Arreguin |
| | Penalties |
| | Jacquesson (penalty scored); Mertz (penalty scored); Williams (penalty scored); Suber (penalty scored) | | (penalty missed) Barry; (penalty scored) Farrell; (penalty scored) Panayotou; (penalty missed) Careaga |

=== US Open Cup ===
| March 18 First round | Hartford Athletic (Connecticut) | 3–0 | (New York (state)) New York Shockers | Hartford, Connecticut |
| 6:30 p.m. EDT | Obalola 12'; Dieng 39'; Ngalina 87' | Report | | Stadium: Trinity Health Stadium; Attendance: 2,287; Referee: Johnathan Luk |

| April 2 Second round | Portland Hearts of Pine (Maine) | 1–1 (4–2 p) | (Connecticut) Hartford Athletic | Lewiston, Maine |
| 6:30 pm ET | | Report | | Stadium: Franklin Athletic Complex; Attendance: 3,002; Referee: Kyle Averill |

=== USL Cup ===
==== Table ====
| Pos | Lg | Team | Pld | W | PKW | PKL | L | GF | GA | GD | Pts | Qualification |
|---|---|---|---|---|---|---|---|---|---|---|---|---|
| 1 | USLC | Rhode Island FC | 4 | 3 | 0 | 1 | 0 | 11 | 4 | +7 | 10 | Advance to knockout stage |
| 2 | USLC | Hartford Athletic | 4 | 2 | 1 | 1 | 0 | 9 | 6 | +3 | 9 | Advance to knockout stage (wild card) |
| 3 | USLC | Detroit City FC | 4 | 2 | 1 | 0 | 1 | 8 | 6 | +2 | 8 | |
| 4 | USL1 | Portland Hearts of Pine | 4 | 1 | 1 | 0 | 2 | 7 | 10 | −3 | 5 | |
| 5 | USLC | Pittsburgh Riverhounds SC | 4 | 1 | 0 | 1 | 2 | 3 | 4 | −1 | 4 | |
| 6 | USL1 | Westchester SC | 4 | 0 | 0 | 0 | 4 | 3 | 11 | −8 | 0 | |

Updated to match(es) played on July 26, 2025. Source: USL

==== Matches ====
===== Group stage =====
| April 26 1 | Hartford Athletic | 2–0 | Portland Hearts of Pine | Hartford, Connecticut |
| | Panayotou 41', 65'; Panayotou (red card) 72' | Report | | Stadium: Trinity Health Stadium; Attendance: 3,878; Referee: Ricardo Montero |

| May 31 2 | Westchester SC | 2–3 | Hartford Athletic | Mount Vernon, New York |
| | Obregón 24' (pen.), 56' (pen.) | Report | Careaga 51', 75'; Dieng 88' | Stadium: The Stadium at Memorial Field; Attendance: 1,653; Referee: Drew Klemp |

| June 28 3 | Hartford Athletic | 2–2 (2–3 p) | Detroit City FC | Hartford, Connecticut |
| 7:00 PM EDT | Anderson 2'; Ngalina 28' | Report | Sheldon 16', 90' | Stadium: Trinity Health Stadium; Attendance: 5,271; Referee: Rodrigo Albuquerque |
| | Penalties |
| | Ngalina (penalty missed); Anderson (penalty missed); Dieng (penalty scored); Farrell (penalty scored); Diz (penalty missed) | | (penalty missed) Diouf; (penalty missed) Rutz; (penalty scored) Guenzatti; (penalty scored) Yamazaki; (penalty scored) Bryant |

| July 26 4 | Rhode Island FC | 2–2 (3–4 p) | Hartford Athletic | Pawtucket, Rhode Island |
| | | Report | | Stadium: Centreville Bank Stadium |

===== Knockout stage =====
| August 20 Quarterfinals | San Antonio FC | 0–2 | Hartford Athletic | San Antonio, Texas |
| | | Report | Dieng 36'; Hairston 58' | Stadium: Toyota Field; Attendance: 4,789; Referee: Natalie Simon |

| September 10 Semifinals | Hartford Athletic | 3–1 | Greenville Triumph SC | Hartford, Connecticut |
| | Farrell 70'; Hairston 85'; Ngalina 90+3' | | Lee 74' | Stadium: Trinity Health Stadium; Referee: Alyssa Pennington |

| October 4 Final | Sacramento Republic FC | 0–1 | Hartford Athletic | Sacramento, California |
| | | | Careaga 51' | Stadium: Heart Health Park; Attendance: 11,569; Referee: Matthew Corrigan |
