= List of Hartford Athletic seasons =

The American soccer club Hartford Athletic has competed in the USL Championship since 2019, following the club's founding in 2018. The following list includes each season of the club's existence, documenting its performance in all competitive competitions.

== Key ==
Key to competitions

- USL Championship (USLC) – The second division of soccer in the United States, established in 2010 and previously known as USL and USL Pro. The Championship was the third division of American soccer from its founding until its elevation to second division status in 2017.
- USL Cup – The inter-league group cup competition between clubs in the USL Championship and USL League One, first contested in 2024.
- U.S. Open Cup (USOC) – The premier knockout cup competition in US soccer, first contested in 1914.
- CONCACAF Champions League (CCL) – The premier competition in North American soccer since 1962. It went by the name of Champions' Cup until 2008.

Key to colors and symbols

1st or W	Winners
2nd or RU	Runners-up
Last	Wooden Spoon
♦	League Golden Boot
	Highest average attendance

Key to league record

- Season = The year and article of the season
- Div = Level on pyramid
- League = League name
- Pld = Games played
- W = Games won
- L = Games lost
- D = Games drawn
- GF = Goals scored
- GA = Goals against
- Pts = Points
- PPG = Points per game
- Conf = Conference position
- Overall = League position

Key to cup record

- DNE = Did not enter
- DNQ = Did not qualify
- NH = Competition not held or canceled
- QR = Qualifying round
- PR = Preliminary round
- GS = Group stage
- R1 = First round
- R2 = Second round
- R3 = Third round
- R4 = Fourth round
- R5 = Fifth round
- QF = Quarterfinals
- SF = Semifinals
- RU = Runners-up
- W = Winners

== Seasons ==
Season	League											Position		Playoffs	USL Cup	USOC	Continental / Other	Average attendance	Top goalscorer(s)	
Season	Div	League	Pld	W	L	D	GF	GA	GD	Pts	PPG	Conf.	Overall	Playoffs	USL Cup	USOC	Continental / Other	Average attendance	Name	Goals
2019	2	USLC	34	8	21	5	49	80	-31	29	0.85	17th	34th	DNQ	DNP	R3	DNQ	5,025	(Poland) Wojciech Wojcik	7
2020	2	USLC	16	11	3	2	31	24	+7	35	2.19	2nd	4th	QF	DNP	NH	DNQ	1,028	(United States) Alex Dixon	6
2021	2	USLC	32	12	15	5	50	50	0	41	1.28	9th	18th	DNQ	DNP	NH	DNQ	4,606	(Honduras) Juan Carlos Obregón	10
2022	2	USLC	34	10	18	6	47	57	-10	36	1.06	10th	22nd	DNQ	DNP	R3	DNQ	4,566	(Uruguay) Ariel Martínez	9
2023	2	USLC	34	4	24	6	40	79	-39	18	0.53	12th	24th	DNQ	DNP	R3	DNQ	4,631	(Liberia) Prince Saydee	10
2024	2	USLC	34	12	14	8	39	52	-13	44	1.29	10th	16th	DNQ	DNP	R3	DNQ	4,904	(Senegal) Mamadou Dieng	11
2025	2	USLC	30	13	12	5	48	33	12	44	1.47	5th	7th	QF	W	R2	DNQ	4,914	(Haiti) Kyle Edwards	12
Total	–	–	214	70	107	37	304	375	-71	304	-	–	–	–		–	–	–	(Senegal) Mamadou Dieng	23

1. Avg. attendance only includes statistics from regular season matches.
2. Top goalscorer(s) includes all goals scored in the regular season, playoffs, U.S. Open Cup, and other competitive matches.
