= 2023 Hartford Athletic season =

Hartford Athletic
2023 season
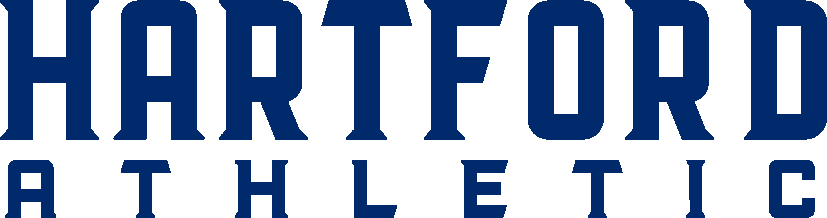
- Head coach: Tab Ramos
- Stadium: Trinity Health Stadium
- USL Championship: Conference: 12th Overall: 24th
- U.S. Open Cup: Third Round

The 2023 Hartford Athletic season was the club's fifth season of existence and their fifth in the USL Championship, the second tier of American soccer.

Hartford Athletic also played in the U.S. Open Cup for the second time in club history.

== Transfers ==
=== In ===
Pos	Player	Transferred from	Fee	Date	Source
FW	(France) Antoine Hoppenot	Detroit City FC	Free transfer	December 1, 2022	
FW	(Saint Vincent and the Grenadines) Kyle Edwards	Houston Dynamo 2	Free transfer	December 7, 2022	
MF	(Canada) Kembo Kibato	FC Tulsa	Free transfer	December 12, 2022	
DF	(Northern Ireland) Niall Logue	Memphis 901 FC	Free transfer	December 15, 2022	
DF	(Trinidad and Tobago) Triston Hodge	Colorado Springs Switchbacks FC	Free transfer	December 19, 2022	
GK	(Mexico) Richard Sánchez	LA Galaxy	Free transfer	January 3, 2023	
FW	(Ghana) Elvis Amoh	Colorado Springs Switchbacks FC	Undisclosed	January 5, 2023	
MF	(United States) Jonathan Filipe	New York Red Bulls II	Free transfer	January 13, 2023	
DF	(United States) Kaveh Rad	Sporting Kansas City	Free transfer	January 20, 2023	
GK	(United States) Joe Rice	Loudoun United	Free transfer	January 24, 2023	
FW	(United States) Joel Quist	Tryout	Free transfer	January 25, 2023	
DF	(United States) Luke Merrill	Tryout	Free transfer	January 27, 2023	
DF	(United States) Matthew Sheldon	Charleston Battery	Free transfer	January 31, 2023	
MF	(Democratic Republic of the Congo) Beverly Makangila	Colorado Springs Switchbacks	Free transfer	January 31, 2023	
FW	(Lebanon) Ali Taleb	Academy	Free transfer	March 8, 2023	
DF	(Albania) Dren Dobruna	Academy	Free transfer	March 8, 2023	
DF	(United States) Juan Pablo Torres	Rio Grande Valley FC Toros	Free transfer	April 21, 2023	
DF	(Venezuela) Edgardo Rito	Oakland Roots SC	Undisclosed	June 8, 2023	

=== Out ===
Pos	Player	Transferred To	Fee	Date	Source
DF	(Togo) Tulu	San Antonio FC	Undisclosed	May 24, 2023	
MF	(Ecuador) Jeciel Cedeño	Oakland Roots SC	Undisclosed	June 8, 2023	

== Schedule ==
=== Exhibitions ===
February 8 Preseason	Hartford Athletic	v	UConn Huskies (NCAA)	Hartford, Connecticut
				Stadium: Trinity Health Stadium
Note: Closed-door

February 13 Preseason	Hartford Athletic	v	Fairfield Stags (NCAA)	Hartford, Connecticut
				Stadium: Trinity Health Stadium
Note: Closed-door

February 13 Preseason	Hartford Athletic	v	Javier Velasco Soccer Academy	Hartford, Connecticut
				Stadium: Trinity Health Stadium
Note: Closed-door

February 18 Preseason	Hartford Athletic	1-2	Columbus Crew (MLS)	Fort Lauderdale, Florida
		Report
Note: Closed-door

February 23 Preseason	Hartford Athletic	5-1	Orlando City B (MLSNP)	Fort Lauderdale, Florida
		Report
Note: Closed-door

March 4 Preseason	New England Revolution II (MLSNP)	0-2	Hartford Athletic	Foxborough, Massachusetts
7:00 PM EST		Report		Stadium: Gillette Stadium

=== USL Championship ===
March 11 1	Monterey Bay FC	5−3	Hartford Athletic	Seaside, California
10:00 PM EST	Dixon 2', 39', 44' (pen.); Rebollar (yellow card) 23', (goal) 67'	Report	Saydee 23', 76'; Rad 41', 45' (o.g.); Amoh (yellow card) 50'; Logue (yellow card) 64'; Yavoubou (yellow card) 90+5'	Stadium: Cardinale Stadium; Attendance: 3,615; Referee: Elijio Arreguin

March 18 2	Colorado Springs Switchbacks FC	1−1	Hartford Athletic	Colorado Springs, Colorado
10:00 PM EST	Zandi (yellow card) 6', (goal) 88'; Foster (yellow card) 77'; Wheeler (yellow card) 90+14'	Report	Rad 35'; Kibato (yellow card) 49'; Amoh 70'; McGlynn (yellow card) 89'	Stadium: Weidner Field; Attendance: 6,248; Referee: Calin Radosav

March 25 3	Hartford Athletic	0−1	Birmingham Legion FC	Hartford, Connecticut
2:00 PM EST	Kibato (yellow card) 42'; Merrill (yellow card) 70'; Logue (yellow card) 90+2'	Report	Alves 24'; Agudelo (yellow card) 45+5'	Stadium: Trinity Health Stadium; Attendance: 3,106; Referee: DeShun Beard

April 1 4	Hartford Athletic	1−1	Orange County SC	Hartford, Connecticut
2:00 PM EST	Rad (yellow card) 6'; Amoh 45+8'; Cedeno (yellow card) 65'; Hodge (yellow card) 70'; Barerra (yellow card) 72'; Logue (yellow card) 84'; McGlynn (yellow card) 90+3'	Report	Iloski 7'; Nakkim (yellow card) 65'; Partida (yellow card) 81'; Doghman (yellow card) 87'; Scott (yellow card) 90+5'; Richards (yellow card) 90+5'	Stadium: Trinity Health Stadium; Attendance: 3,030; Referee: Eric Tattersall

April 8 5	Charleston Battery	3−2	Hartford Athletic	Mount Pleasant, South Carolina
	Dodson (yellow card) 9'; Markanich 35'; Williams 50'; Polvara (yellow card) 57' (yellow-red card) 76'; Rodriguez 90+4', (yellow card) 90+5'	Report	Hoppenot (yellow card) 4'; Saydee 13'; McGlynn 60'; Lapert (yellow card) 77'; Edwards (yellow card) 78'; Kaveh Rad (yellow card) 90+2'	Stadium: Patriots Point; Attendance: 1,661; Referee: Sergii Boiko

April 15 6	Oakland Roots SC	1–2	Hartford Athletic	Hayward, California
10:00 PM EST	Rodriguez (yellow card) 26'; Formella 73' (pen.)	Report	Saydee 31'; Cedeno 35', (yellow card) 71'; Hodge (yellow card) 42'; Edwards (yellow card) 73'; Richard Sánchez (yellow card) 90+5'	Stadium: Pioneer Stadium; Attendance: 4,036; Referee: Matthew Corrigan

April 30 7	Birmingham Legion FC	3-2	Hartford Athletic	Birmingham, Alabama
5:00 PM EST	Asiedu (yellow card) 45'; Enzo Martínez (yellow card) 64', (goal) 65', 76'; Mikey Lopez (yellow card) 82'; Crognale 90+3'	Report	Cedeno 38', (yellow card) 60'; Lewis (yellow card) 45+4'; Edwards (yellow card) 67'; Richard Sánchez 89'	Stadium: Protective Stadium; Attendance: 4,813; Referee: Greg Dopka

May 6 8	Hartford Athletic	0-2	Memphis 901 FC	Hartford, Connecticut
7:00 PM EST	Cedeno (yellow card) 19'; McGlynn (yellow card) 45+2'	Report	Kissiedou 32'; Dally 83'	Stadium: Trinity Health Stadium; Attendance: 5,500; Referee: Abdou Ndiaye

May 13 9	Phoenix Rising FC	3-1	Hartford Athletic	Phoenix, Arizona
10:30 PM EST	Trejo 5'; Njie (yellow card) 10'; Zambrano (yellow card) 70'; C. Harvey 73'; Arteaga 81'; Lambert (yellow card) 84'	Report	Logue (yellow card) 2'; Sheldon (yellow card) 17'; McGlynn (yellow card) 19'; Edwards 44' (pen.); Hodge (yellow card) 61'; Barrera (yellow card) 80'	Stadium: Phoenix Rising Soccer Stadium; Referee: Jonathan Bilinski

May 20 10	Hartford Athletic	2-0	Loudoun United	Hartford, Connecticut
7:00 PM EST	Torres 23'; Sheldon (yellow card) 36'; Amoh 67'; Torres (yellow card) 71'; Merrill (yellow card) 84'; Rad (yellow card) 88'	Report	Houssou (yellow card) 10'; Hopkins (yellow card) 81'	Stadium: Trinity Health Stadium; Referee: Nabil Bensalah

May 26 11	Hartford Athletic	1-4	Sacramento Republic	Hartford, Connecticut
7:30 PM EST	Edwards 23'; Edwards (yellow card) 28'; Cedeño (yellow card) 38'; Logue (yellow card) 45+3'; Amoh (yellow card) 77'	Report	Cicerone 19'; Herrera 38'; Herrera (yellow card) 42'; Sanchez (yellow card) 45+2'; Gurr 51'; Archimède 85'	Stadium: Trinity Health Stadium; Attendance: 5270; Referee: José Carlos Rivero

June 3 12	Hartford Athletic	0-0	Louisville City	Hartford, Connecticut
7:00 PM EST	Hoppenot (yellow card) 76'	Report	Mushagalusa (yellow card) 72'; Gibson (yellow card) 82'	Stadium: Trinity Health Stadium; Attendance: 5098; Referee: Luis Arroyo

June 10 13	Indy Eleven	1-1	Hartford Athletic	Indianapolis, Indiana
7:00 PM EST	Diz Pe (red card) 6'; Lindley (yellow card) 50'; Martínez (yellow card) 64'; Blake 85'; Rissi (red card) 90+3'	Report	Hoppenot (yellow card) 6'; Edwards 11'; Hodge (yellow card) 45+1'; Hodge (yellow card) 49' (yellow-red card); Merrill (yellow card) 58'; Barrera (yellow card) 77'	Stadium: Michael A. Carroll Stadium; Attendance: 9073; Referee: Joshua Encarnación

June 14 14	Hartford Athletic	1-3	Detroit City	Hartford, Connecticut
7:00 PM EST	Rito (yellow card) 34'; Hoppenot 37'; Edwards (yellow card) 42'; Hoppenot (yellow card) 45'		Morris 24'; Simonsen 43'; Morris 59'; Matthews (yellow card) 65'; Rutz (yellow card) 68'; Rodriguez (yellow card) 74'	Stadium: Trinity Health Stadium; Attendance: 4194; Referee: Alexandra Billeter

June 17 15	Hartford Athletic	3-4	Charleston Battery	Hartford, Connecticut
7:00 PM EST	Lewis 31'; Hoppenot (yellow card) 34' (yellow-red card) 48'; McGlynn (yellow card) 36'; Edwards 45+3'; Edwards 57'; Rito (yellow card) 89'; Lapert (yellow card) 90+4'	Report	Markanich (yellow card) 10'; Markanich 43'; Allan (yellow card) 62'; Markanich 64'; Dodson 87'; Paterson 90'	Stadium: Trinity Health Stadium; Attendance: 4404; Referee: Alyssa Nichols

June 24 16	Hartford Athletic	0-2	Indy Eleven	Hartford, Connecticut
7:00 PM EST	Saydee (yellow card) 70'; Rito (yellow card) 87'; Amoh (yellow card) 90+5'	Report	Boudadi (yellow card) 4'; King (yellow card) 49'; Robledo (yellow card) 65'; Lindley 73'; Lindley (yellow card) 74'; Rissi (yellow card) 87'; Martínez 90+5'	Stadium: Trinity Health Stadium; Attendance: 4784; Referee: Amiel Aleman

July 3 17	Loudoun United	0-2	Hartford Athletic	Leesburg, Virginia
7:00 PM EST	Hopkins 20'; Rocha (yellow card) 61'; Houssou (yellow card) 70'; Ryan (yellow card) 80'; Williamson 83'; Chica (yellow card) 89'	Report	Saydee 8'; Merrill (yellow card) 51'; Barrera (yellow card) 90+3'	Stadium: Segra Field; Attendance: 3907; Referee: John Griggs

July 8 18	Hartford Athletic	0-2	San Diego Loyal	Hartford, Connecticut
7:00 PM EST	Edwards (yellow card) 67'; Lapert (yellow card) 84'	Report	Perez (yellow card) 12'; Conway 18'; Martin (yellow card) 26'; Conway (yellow card) 28'; Conway 61'; Riley (yellow card) 90+3'	Stadium: Trinity Health Stadium; Attendance: 5500; Referee: Alexis Da Silva

July 15 19	FC Tulsa	3-2	Hartford Athletic	Tulsa, Oklahoma
9:00 PM EST	Epps 13'; Ruxi (yellow card) 19'; Goodrum 35'; Yosef (yellow card) 62'; Pearson (yellow card) 82'; Goodrum 90+5'	Report	Amoh 24'; McGlynn (yellow card) 28'; Barrera (yellow card) 28'; Tetteh (OG) 60'; Torres (yellow card) 69'	Stadium: ONEOK Field; Attendance: 4110; Referee: Velimir Stefanovic

July 22 20	Las Vegas Lights	0-2	Hartford Athletic	Las Vegas, Nevada
10:30 PM EST	Bagley (yellow card) 89'; Carleton (yellow card) 90+4'	Report	Torres 23'; Edwards 81'	Stadium: Cashman Field; Attendance: -- Referee: Joshua Encarnación

=== U.S. Open Cup ===
Hartford Athletic entered the U.S. Open Cup in the second round.

Apr 4 Second Round	(Connecticut) Hartford Athletic	3−0	(New York (state)) Lansdowne Yonkers FC (EPSL)	Hartford, Connecticut
7:00pm EDT	Amoh 27', 72' (pen.), 82'; Cedeno (yellow card) 51'	Report	Speed (yellow card) 57'; Danso (yellow card) 72'	Stadium: Trinity Health Stadium; Attendance: 500; Referee: E. Constantine; Assistant referees: T. Felice; A. Carr; Fourth official: C. Johnston

Apr 25 Third Round	(Massachusetts) New England Revolution (MLS)	2-1	(Connecticut) Hartford Athletic	Foxborough, Massachusetts
7:30pm EDT	Rennicks 13'; Romney 76'; Gil (yellow card) 86'	Report	Torres (yellow card) 30'; Cedeno (yellow card) 36'; Hoppenot 52'; Lapert (yellow card) 90+2'	Stadium: Gillette Stadium; Attendance: 1,988; Referee: Jeremy Scheer
