= Steven Covino =

American soccer player & coach

Personal information
- Full name: Steven Covino
- Date of birth: May 17, 1989 (age 37)
- Place of birth: Bristol, Connecticut, U.S.
- Height: 5 ft 11 in (1.80 m)
- Position: Midfielder

Team information
- Current team: Connecticut FC Azul
- Number: 24

Youth career
- 2007–2010: Siena Saints

Senior career*
Years	Team	Apps	(Gls)
2010	Western Mass Pioneers	14	(4)
2011	F.C. New York	13	(2)
2012–2013	Connecticut FC Azul	15	(4)
- * Club domestic league appearances and goals as of May 14, 2012

Steven Covino (born May 17, 1989) is an American former soccer player who last played for Connecticut FC Azul in the USL Premier Development League. As of 2019, he is coaching within Atlanta United's Youth Academy with their U17's.

== Career ==
=== College and amateur ===
Covino attended Bristol Central High School where he was voted the #1 player in CCC South Conference his senior year. He secured All-Conference honors in his sophomore and junior seasons, earned the team's Playmaker Award and MVP at the conclusion of his junior season, and as a senior he earned Team MVP honors, All-State recognition and All-New England.

He went on to play four years of college soccer at Siena College, where he was an All-MAAC Second Team selection as a sophomore in 2008 and also as a senior in 2010. During his senior campaign at Siena, Covino scored 8 goals in 18 games and also added 4 assists for 20 points. in 2010, he was also voted to the NSCAA/Performance Subaru All-North Atlantic Region Third Team. He finished his college career with 10 goals and 10 assists in 71 games.

During his college years Covino also played with the Western Mass Pioneers in the USL Premier Development League.

=== Professional ===
Covino signed his first professional contract in 2011 when he was signed by F.C. New York of the USL Professional Division on February 1, 2011. He made his professional debut on April 9, 2011, in New York's first-ever game, a 3–0 loss to Orlando City. He then signed for Connecticut FC Azul on March 27, 2012.

== Personal life ==
He is married to Lara Silva an actress who plays as “Eden” in The Chosen (TV series).
