= AC Connecticut (women) =

AC Connecticut women
- Full name: AC Connecticut women
- Founded: June 8, 2021; 5 years ago (as Hartford Athletic women)
- Stadium: Westside Athletic Complex; Danbury, Connecticut
- Capacity: 2,500
- League: USL W League

AC Connecticut women is an American women's amateur soccer club that competes in the USL W League. They are the women's team of AC Connecticut of USL League Two, which is an affiliate of Hartford Athletic, a men's team in the USL Championship.

== History ==
On June 8, 2021, it was announced that USL Championship team Hartford Athletic would operate an affiliate club and be one of the eight founding members of the new league.

On November 23, 2021, it was announced that the team would instead operate under the name AC Connecticut, the same name as the USL League Two team, AC Connecticut. AC Connecticut will now serve as the affiliate to Hartford Athletic.

== Seasons ==
Year	League	Reg. season	Playoffs
2022	USL W League	5th Metropolitan	DNQ
2023	USL W League	8th Metropolitan	DNQ
2024	USL W League	7th Metropolitan	DNQ
2025	USL W League	6th Metropolitan	DNQ
2026	USL W League	5th Northeast	DNQ

== See also ==
- AC Connecticut
- Hartford Athletic
