= Trinity Health Stadium =

Multipurpose stadium in Hartford, Connecticut

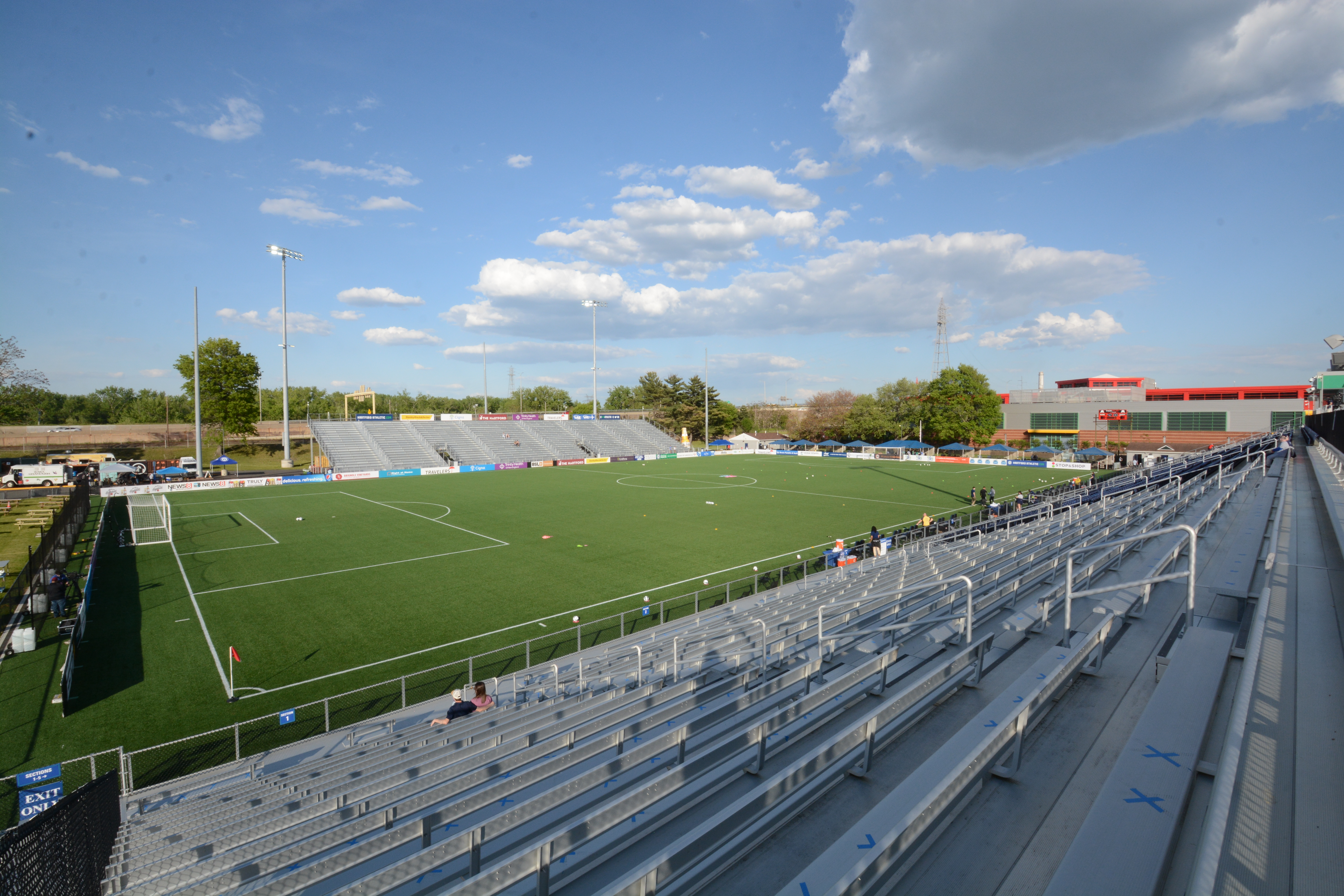
- Trinity Health Stadium in 2021
- Interactive map of Trinity Health Stadium
- Former names: Dillon Stadium (1935–2022)
- Location: 250 Huyshope Avenue Hartford, Connecticut 06106
- Coordinates: 41.7538°N 72.6611°W
- Operator: City of Hartford
- Capacity: Football and Soccer: 9,600 (1935–2019); 5,500, expandable to 10,000 (2019–); Concerts: 20,000 (1935–2019); 10,000 (2019–)
- Surface: Seeded grass (1935–2018); FieldTurf (2019–present)
- Field size: 115 x 74 yards
- Public transit: CT Transit route 59

Construction
- Opened: 1935
- Renovated: 2018–2019

Tenants
- American football Hartford Charter Oaks (ACFL/COFL) 1964–1968; Hartford Knights (ACFL/SFL) 1968–1973; Connecticut Crushers (NWFA/IWFL) 2001–2010; New England Nightmare (WFA) 2010–2012 Soccer Hartford S.C. (ASL) 1964–1968; Connecticut Yankees (ASL) 1972–1978; Hartford Bicentennials (NASL) 1975–1976; Hartford Athletic (USLC) 2019–present UConn Huskies (men's & women's) (NCAA) 2019; AC Connecticut (USL2) 2021–2023; Hartford City FC (NPSL) 2022–2025 Ultimate Frisbee New York Empire (UFA) 2024 (selected matches)

Trinity Health Stadium (formerly Dillon Stadium) is a multipurpose facility in Hartford, Connecticut, United States. It has been host to concerts and sporting events. It was formerly the home of the New England Nightmare of the Women's Football Alliance (WFA). It is now the home of USL Championship club Hartford Athletic and National Premier Soccer League club Hartford City FC. The UConn Huskies men's and women's soccer teams played a majority of their 2019 matches at Dillon Stadium after starting their seasons at Al-Marzook Field in West Hartford, Connecticut.

== Sports ==
=== Football ===
Dillon Stadium was built in 1935. Formerly named Municipal Stadium, it was renamed in 1956 after James H. Dillon, the City's recreation director. Dillon Stadium was the home of two minor league football teams in the 1960s and 70s: the Hartford Charter Oaks of the Atlantic Coast Football League and Continental Football League, owned by the Brewer family, and the Hartford Knights, also of the ACFL and Seaboard Football League. Dillon is now used primarily for high school football teams, including the Bulkeley Bulldogs, the SMSA Tigers, the Prince Tech Falcons, and the Capital Prep Trailblazers. Dillon also hosts the annual Thanksgiving Day Turkey Game between Hartford Public Owls and the Weaver Beavers. Lights were added in 1964 to accommodate the Oaks. The stadium also hosted occasional club-level college football games hosted by the University of Hartford. The Hartford Colonials of the United Football League, in part because of a change of management at Rentschler Field, experienced significant delays in renewing their lease for the 2011 season and had backup plans to relocate to Dillon Stadium (or Willow Brook Park), although neither venue was believed to be ideal for the UFL. The Colonials did sign a deal with Rentschler in June, but suspended operations on August 10, 2011; the league later folded it outright.

=== Soccer ===
==== International matches ====
Date	Teams	Match Type	Attendance	Notes
September 9, 1973	United States 1–0 Bermuda	International Friendly	4,200	
June 21, 1975	Hartford Bicentennials (United States) 0–2 Poland	Friendly	10,746	
June 8, 1977	Connecticut Bicentennials (United States) 0–2 (Italy) Lazio	Friendly	3,154	
August 17, 2019	Hartford Athletic (United States) 5–1 Puerto Rico	Friendly	4,685	
October 26, 2019	Hartford Athletic (United States) 1–2 (Jamaica) Portmore United F.C.	Friendly	–	
July 21, 2023	F.C. Motagua (Honduras) 2–1 (Guatemala) Comunicaciones F.C.	Friendly	–	
July 21, 2023	C.D. Olimpia (Honduras) 0–1 (Guatemala) C.S.D. Municipal	Friendly	–	
July 16, 2024	Olancho FC (Honduras) 1–2 (Guatemala) C.S.D. Municipal	Friendly	–	
July 16, 2024	F.C. Motagua (Honduras) 1–1 (Guatemala) Comunicaciones F.C.	Friendly	–	

==== Professional matches ====
Date	Teams	Match Type	Attendance	Notes
December 3, 1973	Hartford Hellenic (Connecticut) 3-2 (Connecticut) New Haven City	1973 National Challenge Cup; First Round	–	
October 10, 2020	Hartford Athletic (Connecticut) 0–1 (Missouri) Saint Louis FC	USL Championship Quarterfinal	2,194	
March 22, 2022	Hartford City FC (Connecticut) 0–3 (New York (state)) Oyster Bay United FC	2022 U.S. Open Cup; Round 1	200	
April 7, 2022	Hartford Athletic (Connecticut) 3–1 (New York (state)) Oyster Bay United FC	2022 U.S. Open Cup; Round 2	1,634	
April 20, 2022	Hartford Athletic (Connecticut) 1–2 (New Jersey) New York Red Bulls	2022 U.S. Open Cup; Round 3	5,144	
March 23, 2023	Hartford City FC (Connecticut) 1–2 (New York (state)) Lansdowne Yonkers FC	2023 U.S. Open Cup; Round 1	500	
April 4, 2023	Hartford Athletic (Connecticut) 3–0 (New York (state)) Lansdowne Yonkers FC	2023 U.S. Open Cup; Round 2	500	
April 17, 2024	Hartford Athletic (Connecticut) 2-3 (New York (state)) New York City FC II	2024 U.S. Open Cup; Round 3	2,552	
March 18, 2025	Hartford Athletic (Connecticut) 3–0 (New York (state)) New York Shockers	2025 U.S. Open Cup; Round 1	2,287	
October 4, 2026	Hartford Athletic (Connecticut) 0-1 (Kentucky) Louisville City FC	2026 USL Cup Final	6,179	

==== College ====
Date	Teams	Competition	Attendance
September 8, 2019	Boston University Terriers 1–3 UConn Huskies	Non-conference	328
September 15, 2019	Harvard Crimson 3–1 UConn Huskies	Non-conference	567
September 17, 2019	Manhattan Jaspers 1–2 UConn Huskies	Non-conference	1,221
September 20, 2019	Columbia Lions 3–2 UConn Huskies	Non-conference	2,241
September 26, 2019	East Carolina Pirates 1–0 UConn Huskies	Conference	457
September 26, 2019	Cincinnati Bearcats 1–0 UConn Huskies	Conference	0
October 4, 2019	Memphis Tigers 1–0 UConn Huskies	Conference	1,007
October 8, 2019	Providence Friars 2–1 UConn Huskies	Non-conference	758
October 10, 2019	Houston Cougars 1–2 UConn Huskies	Conference	216
October 13, 2019	Southern Methodist Mustangs 0–1 UConn Huskies	Conference	2,109
October 20, 2019	Central Florida Knights 2–1 UConn Huskies	Conference	1,625
October 31, 2019	Temple Owls 1–1 UConn Huskies	Conference	561
November 5, 2019	Tulsa Golden Hurricane 3–6 UConn Huskies	Conference	1,114

=== Rugby ===
Date	Teams	Match Type	Attendance	Notes
June 19, 1982	England 59–0 United States	1982 England Tour	9,000	
May 18, 1991	Scotland XV 41–12 United States	Friendly		
July 3, 2004	France 39–31 United States	Friendly	5,840	

Trinity Health Stadium has hosted rugby on multiple occasions; including hosting the US men's national team and club nationals. In 1984, the USA Rugby Club National Championship was held at Trinity Health Stadium between Dallas Harlequins and Los Angeles Rugby Club with Dallas coming out victorious with a final score of 31-12. The venue would then host the USA Rugby Club Sevens National Championship Series on August 21 and 23, 1993. Old Blue R.F.C. would defeat the Kansas City Blues 40-22 to secure the national championship.

=== Ultimate frisbee ===
Date	Visiting Team	Score	Home Team	League	Attendance	Notes
June 29, 2024	Salt Lake Shred	14-25	New York Empire	UFA	--	
July 20, 2024	DC Breeze	24-20	New York Empire	UFA		

== Renovation ==
Hartford City FC, a projected indoor soccer franchise that also hoped to compete in the outdoor North American Soccer League, announced plans to reconstruct Dillon Stadium to create a 15,000 seat soccer-only stadium for the 2017 season.

In 2014, the city awarded a $12 million contract to Premier Sports Management to redevelop the stadium in hopes of attracting a professional soccer team. The company was unable to interest various soccer leagues and instead partnered with an outside investor seeking to build a larger stadium on the site with city funding. However, the city ended the project in October 2015 over financial and legal concerns with the investment group, who were later found guilty of embezzling $1 million from the redevelopment fund.

On February 17, 2018, the State Bond Commission approved $10 million in public funding. This would help the Hartford Sports Group establish a USL club in 2019.

The stadium is expandable up to a capacity of 15,000.

== Concerts ==
On June 27, 1966, The Rolling Stones played in Dillon Stadium, supported by The McCoys (with their up-and-coming guitarist, Rick Derringer). Near the end of the Stones' performance, fans rushed the stage, so electricity to the amplifiers was cut. Mick Jagger threw his microphone stand out into the crowd, and the Stones then left the venue, as fans began breaking chairs. Police gathered the crowd towards the exits.

The Beach Boys performed there in 1972 and again in 1973.

The Grateful Dead played two concerts at Dillon Stadium - in 1972 and 1974. On July 16, 1972, they were joined on stage by Dickey Betts, Berry Oakley and Jai Johanny Johanson of the Allman Brothers. Their July 31, 1974, performance at the field was released as an album titled Dave's Picks Volume 2.

Date	Artist	Opening act(s)	Tour / Concert name	Attendance	Gross	Notes
June 27, 1966	The Rolling Stones	The McCoys; The Standells	The Rolling Stones American Tour 1966			
July 16, 1972	Grateful Dead		Summer 1972	14,000		
August 18, 1972	The Doors	The Beach Boys; The Kinks; Phlorescent Leech & Eddie		14,000		
August 20, 1972	Jefferson Airplane					
September 25, 1972	Yes		Close to the Edge Tour			
June 23, 1973	The Allman Brothers Band	The Marshall Tucker Band; Sons of Champlin				
August 17, 1973	Santana		Caravanserai Tour			
August 24, 1973	The Beach Boys	Poco; Jonathan Edwards				
July 31, 1974	Grateful Dead		Summer 1974	20,000		
August 26, 1974	Aerosmith	Deep Purple; Elf				
August 29, 1974	The Doobie Brothers	Loggins and Messina				
May 26, 1976	Ted Nugent					
