= Joey Akpunonu =

American soccer player (born 2001)

Personal information
- Full name: Joseph Akpunonu
- Date of birth: December 21, 2001 (age 24)
- Place of birth: Toledo, Ohio, United States
- Height: 6 ft 3 in (1.91 m)
- Position: Center-back

Team information
- Current team: Charleston Battery
- Number: 22

Youth career
- 2018–2020: Pacesetter SC

College career
Years	Team	Apps	(Gls)
2020–2022	Bowling Green Falcons	48	(8)

Senior career*
Years	Team	Apps	(Gls)
2021–2022	Toledo Villa	22	(1)
2023–2024	FC Cincinnati	1	(0)
2023	FC Cincinnati 2	23	(0)
2024	→ Hartford Athletic (loan)	14	(0)
2024	→ Huntsville City FC (loan)	8	(0)
2025–	Charleston Battery	56	(1)
- * Club domestic league appearances and goals as of November 4, 2026

Joseph Akpunonu (born December 21, 2001) is an American professional soccer player who plays as a center-back for the USL Championship side Charleston Battery.

== Club career ==
Akpunonu went to high school at St. John's Jesuit High School, where he was a three-year letter winner. He played college soccer with the Bowling Green Falcons from 2020 to 2022, where he received 2022 Academic All-America First Team honors in his final year. In the summers, he played with USL League Two side Toledo Villa. In December 2022, he was one of 44 players invited to the 2022 adidas MLS College Showcase. He was drafted 22nd overall in the first round of the 2023 MLS SuperDraft on December 2, 2022, by FC Cincinnati. First assigned to their reserves, he made his professional debut with FC Cincinnati in a 1–0 U.S. Open Cup win over Louisville City FC on April 27, 2023.

On February 6, 2024, Akpunonu joined USL Championship club Hartford Athletic on a season loan for the 2024 season.

Akpunonu signed with Charleston Battery of the USL Championship on January 13, 2025.

== Personal life ==
Akpunonu is of Nigerian descent. He studied biology at Bowling Green State University, and intends to become a doctor, like his father (Basil Akpunonu), mother (Elizabeth Hoffman), and brother (Peter Akpunonu).). He had a 4.0 grade-point average, and was named to an 11-man Academic All-America First Team just prior to leaving Bowling Green State University.

== Honors ==
FC Cincinnati

- Supporters' Shield: 2023

Individual

- Bowling Green State University Athlete of the Year: 2022
