= Joe Farrell (soccer) =

American soccer player (born 1994)

Personal information
- Full name: Joseph Farrell
- Date of birth: February 13, 1994 (age 32)
- Place of birth: Blue Bell, Pennsylvania, United States
- Height: 6 ft 2 in (1.88 m)
- Position: Defender

College career
Years	Team	Apps	(Gls)
2012–2015	La Salle Explorers	76	(16)

Senior career*
Years	Team	Apps	(Gls)
2014–2015	New York Red Bulls U-23	26	(5)
2016–2017	Rochester Rhinos	60	(7)
2018–2022	Phoenix Rising	114	(8)
2023	Pittsburgh Riverhounds	27	(3)
2024–2025	Hartford Athletic	53	(2)
- * Club domestic league appearances and goals as of October 25, 2025

Joseph Farrell (born February 13, 1994) is an American former professional soccer player.

== Career ==
=== College and amateur ===
Farrell played fours years of college soccer at the La Salle University between 2012 and 2015.

Farrell also played with New York Red Bulls U-23 in 2014 to 2015. Joe Farell was a member of the Psc Coppa club as a youth.

=== Professional ===
Farrell signed his first professional deal with United Soccer League club Rochester Rhinos on March 8, 2016.

Farrell signed with Phoenix Rising FC for the 2018 season on December 18, 2017.

Farrell was transferred to the Pittsburgh Riverhounds on December 29, 2022.

In December 2023, Farrell joined Hartford Athletic. Following the 2025 season, Farrell retired from playing professional soccer.

== Honors ==
Individual

- USL All-League Second Team: 2016
