= AC Connecticut =

- Full name: Athletic Club Connecticut
- Founded: 2011; 15 years ago
- Stadium: Westside Athletic Complex; Danbury, Connecticut
- Capacity: 2,500
- Majority Owner: Peter D'Amico
- General Manager: Robin Schuppert
- League: USL League Two
- 2024: 5th, Northeast Division; Playoffs: DNQ
- Website: acconnecticut.com
Home colors	Away colors

AC Connecticut is an American amateur soccer club based in Newtown, Connecticut, playing in USL League Two, the fourth tier of the American soccer pyramid. The team colors are blue, black and white.

== History ==
CFC Azul was founded as a USL PDL team on December 21, 2011, and launched its inaugural season in 2012. The club is the pinnacle for a 70-plus youth team organization and is Connecticut's only professional organized soccer franchise. In its first season of play, CFC Azul finished mid-table tied for 4th place with fellow expansion team Worcester Hydra.

In 2013, CFC finished in 6th place with a record of 2 wins, 6 losses and 6 draws. In time for the start of the 2014 season, Peter D'Amico became the primary owner and managing partner of the Azul. Additionally, CFC teamed up with WXCI 91.7 FM to broadcast play-by-play of Azul's home games.

The team split off from its Connecticut Football Club (CFC) parent and was renamed AC Connecticut on September 5, 2014.

In 2021, AC Connecticut announced a partnership with Hartford Athletic to identify potential players and create a pathway to pro soccer.

== Stadium ==
The team was originally scheduled to play their home games at Reese Stadium on the campus of Yale University. However, due to scheduling conflicts, CFC Azul ended playing their 2012 home games at various locations throughout Connecticut including Veterans Stadium in New Britain, CT. For the 2013 season, CFC Azul played their home games at Central Connecticut State University. CFC Azul signed a multi-year contract to play their games the Westside Athletic Complex at Western Connecticut State University. AC Connecticut now plays their home games at Trinity Health Stadium in Hartford, CT, the home of the USL Championship team, the Hartford Athletic. They also have facilities in Newtown, CT at Newtown Youth Academy.

== Year-by-year ==
Year	Level	League	Reg. season	Playoffs	U.S. Open Cup
CFC Azul
2012	4	USL PDL	5th, Northeast	did not qualify	did not qualify
2013	4	USL PDL	6th, Northeast	did not qualify	did not qualify
2014	4	USL PDL	2nd, Northeast	Conference Semifinals	did not qualify
AC Connecticut
2015	4	USL PDL	4th, Northeast	did not qualify	1st Round
2016	4	USL PDL	6th, Northeast	did not qualify	did not qualify
2017	4	USL PDL	6th, Northeast	did not qualify	did not qualify
2018	4	USL PDL	5th, Northeast	did not qualify	did not qualify
2019	4	USL League Two	8th, Northeast	did not qualify	did not qualify
2020	Season cancelled due to COVID-19 pandemic				
2021	4	USL League Two	6th, Northeast	did not qualify	did not qualify
2022	4	USL League Two	7th, Northeast	did not qualify	did not qualify
2023	4	USL League Two	7th, Northeast	did not qualify	did not qualify
2024	4	USL League Two	5th, Northeast	did not qualify	did not qualify
2025	4	USL League Two	4th, Northeast	did not qualify	did not qualify
2026	4	USL League Two	9th, Northeast	did not qualify	did not qualify

== Players and staff ==
=== Notable former players ===
- (United States) Steve Covino
- (United States) Ryan Kinne
- (United States) Jannik Eckenrode
- (Canada) Gianluca Catalano
- (United States) Henry Kessler

=== Current staff ===
- (Germany) Robin Schuppert – General Manager
- (England) Alex Harrison – Head Coach
- (United States) Joe Mingachos – Head Coach
- (United States) Joe Falstoe – Assistant Coach
- (United States) Sean Weir – Fitness Coach
- (United States) Paul Winstanley – Goalie Coach

== See also ==
- AC Connecticut women
- Hartford Athletic
