= Younes Boudadi =

Belgian-Moroccan footballer (born 1996)

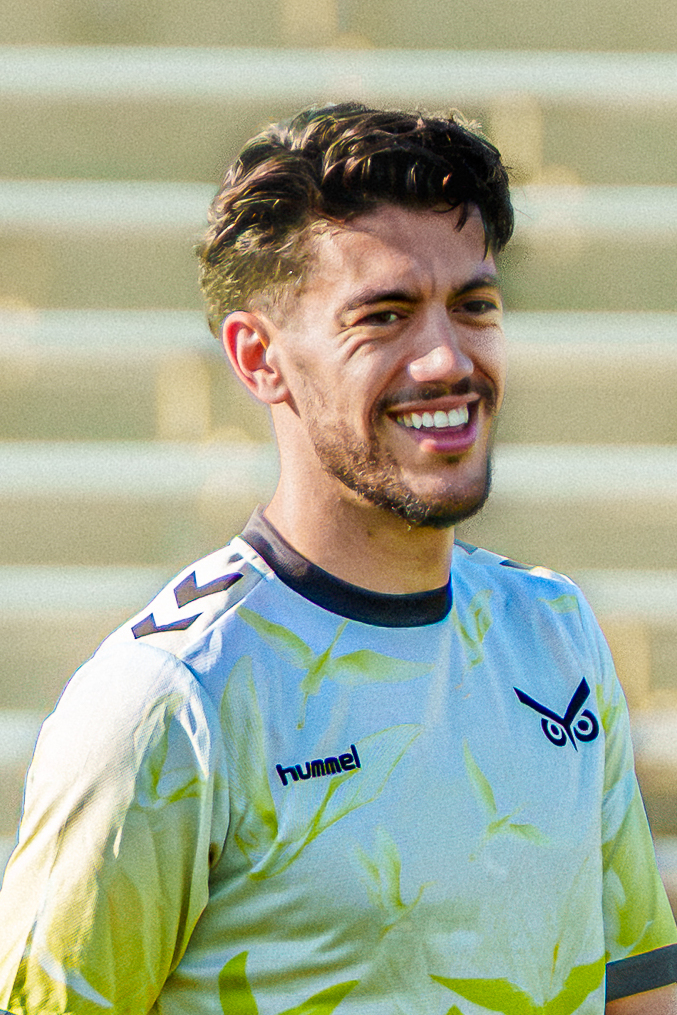
- Boudadi with Union Omaha in 2026

Personal information
- Date of birth: 23 January 1996 (age 30)
- Place of birth: Ypres, Belgium
- Height: 6 ft 0 in (1.83 m)
- Position: Defender

Team information
- Current team: Union Omaha
- Number: 23

Youth career
- 2004–2016: Club Brugge

College career
Years	Team	Apps	(Gls)
2016–2017	Boston College Eagles	35	(0)
2018–2019	Creighton Bluejays	34	(1)

Senior career*
Years	Team	Apps	(Gls)
2017	Boston Bolts	3	(0)
2018	Laredo Heat	7	(1)
2020	Reno 1868	6	(0)
2021–2022	Hartford Athletic	61	(0)
2023–2024	Indy Eleven	40	(0)
2024	Hartford Athletic	17	(0)
2025	Las Vegas Lights	22	(0)
2026–	Union Omaha	30	(0)

International career^{‡}
2013–2014	Morocco U17	10	(0)
2014	Morocco U20	1	(0)
- * Club domestic league appearances and goals as of 31 October 2026 ‡ National team caps and goals as of 20 July 2020

Younes Boudadi (Arabic: يونس بودادي; born 23 January 1996) is a professional footballer who plays as a defender for Union Omaha in USL League One. Born in Belgium, he has represented Morocco at youth level.

== Club career ==
=== Amateur ===
Boudadi joined Club Brugge when he was just 7 years old and played with them for over 13 years.

After leaving Club Brugge, Boudadi opted to move to the United States to play college soccer, and accepted a scholarship to play at Boston College in 2016. After two years in Boston, Boudadi transferred to play at Creighton University, where he played for a further two years.

Whilst at college, Boudadi appeared for fourth-tier sides in the USL PDL and the NPSL. In 2017 he played with Boston Bolts and in 2018 Laredo Heat.

=== Professional ===
On 13 January 2020, Boudadi was selected 102nd overall in the 2020 MLS SuperDraft by Los Angeles FC. However, he did not sign with the club.

On 26 March 2020, Boudadi signed with USL Championship side Reno 1868. He made his debut on 19 July 2020, appearing as a 56th-minute substitute in a 1–0 loss to Sacramento Republic.

Following Reno's folding, due to the financial impact of the COVID-19 pandemic, Boudadi signed with USL Championship side Hartford Athletic on 22 December 2020.

On 2 December 2022, it was announced Boudadi would join USL Championship side Indy Eleven ahead of their upcoming 2023 season.

Boudadi assisted club captain Tyler Gibson in the club's first league goal of the 2024 season in a 2–1 defeat at Oakland Roots on 9 March 2024. He recorded a second assist to forward Sebastian Guenzatti in a 2–1 loss to Detroit City FC on 30 March 2024.

On 14 June 2024, Hartford Athletic announced Boudadi had returned to the Connecticut-based club in a swap deal with Indy Eleven that saw forward Romario Williams join the Eleven. Boudadi made his second debut with Hartford on 15 June, in a 2–0 home win over Pittsburgh Riverhounds SC. He left Hartford following their 2024 season.

On 20 February 2025, the Las Vegas Lights FC announced that Boudadi had signed for them on a one-year contract with an option to extend for a second year. He was released by Las Vegas following their 2025 season.

In 2026, Boudadi signed for Union Omaha in USL League One.

== International career ==
Boudadi has represented Morocco at under-17 and under-20 levels, including at the 2013 FIFA U-17 World Cup.

== Personal life ==
Boudadi is a polyglot, speaking four languages: Arabic, French, Dutch and English.

=== Racial abuse incident ===
After Hartford defeated Loudoun United on 4 July 2021, Boudadi received a number of racist messages on Instagram. Boudadi went public with these messages immediately and the United Soccer League was able to investigate and ban the unnamed perpetrator from all USL events.
