= Triston Hodge =

Trinidadian footballer (born 1994)

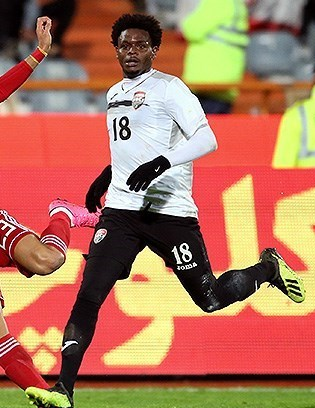
- Hodge with Trinidad and Tobago in 2018

Personal information
- Date of birth: 9 October 1994 (age 32)
- Place of birth: Trinidad and Tobago
- Height: 1.83 m (6 ft 0 in)
- Position: Defender

Team information
- Current team: Defence Force F.C.

Senior career*
Years	Team	Apps	(Gls)
2015–2021	W Connection	5	(0)
2016	→ Toronto FC II (loan)	3	(0)
2019–2020	→ Memphis 901 (loan)	20	(1)
2021–2022	Colorado Springs Switchbacks	42	(1)
2023–2024	Hartford Athletic	48	(0)
2025	North Carolina FC	16	(0)

International career^{‡}
2015–	Trinidad and Tobago	30	(0)
- * Club domestic league appearances and goals as of 26 October 2025 ‡ National team caps and goals as of 7 August 2025

Triston Hodge (born 9 October 1994), sometimes incorrectly referred to as Tristan Hodge, is a Trinidadian professional footballer who plays as a defender for Defence Force F.C., and for the Trinidad and Tobago national team.

== Club career ==
Hodge made his Toronto FC II debut as a half-time substitute as in a match opposed to Charlotte Independence.

After two seasons on loan to USL Championship side Memphis 901 FC, Hodge move permanently to Colorado Springs Switchbacks on 25 January 2021.

On 19 December 2022, it was announced that Hodge would join USL Championship side Hartford Athletic for the 2023 season.

Hodge signed with North Carolina FC in January 2025 on a two-year contract.

== International career ==
Prior to the 2017 Caribbean Cup qualification, the Trinidad and Tobago coach Stephen Hart selected a 21-man squad, Hodge being included.
