= Michee Ngalina =

Congolese footballer (born 2000)

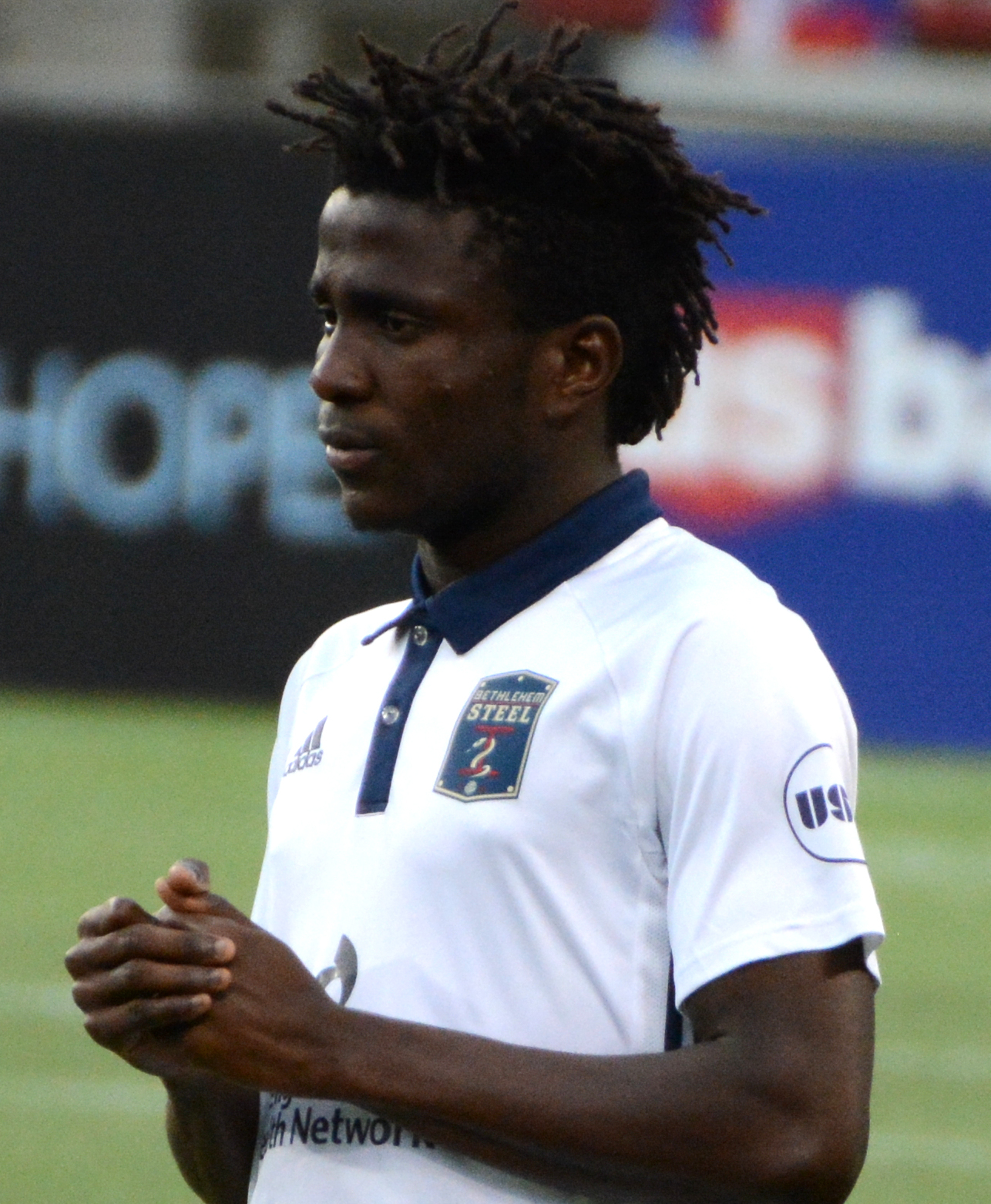
- Ngalina with Bethlehem Steel in 2018

Personal information
- Date of birth: 6 April 2000 (age 26)
- Place of birth: Kinshasa, DR Congo
- Height: 1.80 m (5 ft 11 in)
- Positions: Winger; forward

Team information
- Current team: Hartford Athletic
- Number: 11

Youth career
- Montverde Academy

Senior career*
Years	Team	Apps	(Gls)
2018–2019	Bethlehem Steel	31	(10)
2019–2020	Philadelphia Union	1	(0)
2019	→ Bethlehem Steel (loan)	15	(3)
2021–2022	Colorado Springs Switchbacks	55	(20)
2021	→ Los Angeles (loan)	2	(0)
2023–2024	Göztepe	15	(3)
2023	→ Haugesund (loan)	3	(0)
2024–	Hartford Athletic	79	(19)

International career
2016	DR Congo U17		
- * Club domestic league appearances and goals as of 22:53, 4 November 2026 (UTC)

Michee Ngalina (born 6 April 2000) is a Congolese footballer who plays as a forward for USL Championship club Hartford Athletic.

== Career ==
Ngalina spent time with the Florida-based Montverde Academy before going on trial at United Soccer League side Bethlehem Steel. He joined the club permanently on 27 April 2018.

On 8 May 2019, Ngalina signed for MLS side Philadelphia Union.

Ngalina was released by Philadelphia following their 2020 season. On 25 December 2020, it was announced that Ngalina would join USL Championship side Colorado Springs Switchbacks ahead of their 2021 season.

On 21 September 2021, Ngalina was loaned to Major League Soccer side Los Angeles FC for the remainder of the 2021 season.

On 9 November 2022, Ngalina was named the 2022 USL Championship Young Player of the Year.

On 2 January 2023, it was announced that Ngalina had signed with Turkish TFF First League side Göztepe on a two-and-a-half-year deal.

On 26 August 2023, Norwegian Eliteserien side Haugesund announced that they have made a loan-deal with Ngalina until 31 July 2024.

On 8 February 2024, Ngalina signed with Hartford Athletic for the 2024 USL Championship season.

== Honors ==
Individual

- USL Championship Young Player of the year: 2022
