= Mamadou Dieng =

Senegalese footballer (born 2004)

Personal information
- Full name: Mamadou Dieng
- Date of birth: February 4, 2004 (age 22)
- Place of birth: Senegal
- Height: 6 ft 2 in (1.88 m)
- Position: Forward

Team information
- Current team: Minnesota United
- Number: 29

Youth career
- Sahel Academy

Senior career*
Years	Team	Apps	(Gls)
2024–2025	Hartford Athletic	49	(20)
2025–	Minnesota United	4	(0)
2026–	Minnesota United 2	0	(0)
- * Club domestic league appearances and goals

Mamadou Dieng (born February 4, 2004) is a Senegalese professional footballer who plays as a forward for Major League Soccer club Minnesota United.

== Career ==
=== Hartford Athletic ===
==== 2024 ====
On February 13, 2024, it was announced that Dieng had joined Hartford on a long-term contract. Prior to joining Hartford, Dieng played for the Sahel Academy in Senegal. He made his debut in Hartford's home opener against Birmingham Legion, playing 86 minutes in the 1–0 win. He played all 120 minutes in the 3–2 loss to New York City FC II in the US Open Cup.

Having gone 12 games goalless, Dieng was able to score his first professional goal against the Charleston Battery in the 2–2 draw. His goal opened the scoring. He followed up with a goal against the Pittsburgh Riverhounds, though Hartford would still end up losing the match 3–1. He came off the bench to score a goal against Birmingham, reducing the scoreline from 2–0 to 2–1. Hartford went on to draw the game. Dieng then went on a scoring streak of three, with goals against Las Vegas Lights, two against Louisville City, and one against Detroit City. This brought his total to 7 goals in his last 9 games. Dieng would net a brace in the 3–0 win over Miami FC and also win the Man of the Match award. He closed out the season with goals against North Carolina and the Tampa Bay Rowdies, while Hartford would finish without a playoff spot.
