= Beverly Makangila =

Congolese footballer (born 2000)

Personal information
- Date of birth: 11 April 2000 (age 26)
- Place of birth: Kinshasa, DR Congo
- Height: 1.80 m (5 ft 11 in)
- Position: Midfielder

Team information
- Current team: Hartford Athletic
- Number: 6

Senior career*
Years	Team	Apps	(Gls)
–2020	FC Saint-Éloi		
2020	MFK Vyškov	0	(0)
2020	→ San Diego Loyal (loan)	6	(0)
2021	Metalac	0	(0)
2021–2022	Colorado Springs Switchbacks	52	(0)
2023–	Hartford Athletic	90	(3)
- * Club domestic league appearances and goals as of November 4, 2026

Beverly Makangila (born 11 April 2000) is a Congolese professional footballer who plays as a midfielder for Hartford Athletic in the USL Championship.
