= Hartford Athletic =

American professional soccer club based in Hartford

- Full name: Hartford Athletic
- Founded: July 11, 2018; 8 years ago
- Stadium: Trinity Health Stadium
- Capacity: 5,500
- Owner: Hartford Sports Group
- Head coach: Brendan Burke
- League: USL Championship
- 2025: 5th, Eastern Conference; Playoffs: Conference Quarter-Finals
- Website: hartfordathletic.com
Home colors	Away colors

Hartford Athletic is an American professional soccer team based in Hartford, Connecticut. The club was founded in 2018 and started play in the USL Championship in 2019.

== History ==
On July 18, 2018, the USL announced that Hartford, Connecticut would have a USL Championship team, beginning play in 2019. A few months later on September 5, Jimmy Nielsen was named the first head coach for the club. In December 2018, Wojciech Wójcik, Jose Angulo and Alex Dixon were announced as the first signings in club history.

=== Early struggles ===
==== 2019 ====
Hartford Athletic's first game in club history was a 2–0 loss to Atlanta United 2. The club proceeded to lose its next seven games, scoring just four goals. However, Hartford picked up their first point in their inaugural home game, a 1–1 draw in front of 11,346 fans at Rentschler Field. The first competitive victory in club history came in the U.S. Open Cup, a 2–1 win over New York Cosmos B. The club finished the 2019 season on a three match unbeaten run, putting them at 17th in the Eastern Conference.

==== 2020 ====
In the COVID-19 affected 2020 season, Hartford finished atop Group F, and hosted St. Louis FC in the first round of the playoffs. However, a late goal from St. Louis eliminated Hartford in their first playoff game.

==== 2021 ====
Hartford regressed in 2021, finishing 5th in the Eastern Conference and missed the playoffs by six points.

==== 2022 ====
Hartford finished 10th in the Eastern Conference in 2022, and hosted MLS club New York Red Bulls in the U.S. Open Cup, losing 2–1.

==== 2023 ====
2023 was the worst season in Hartford Athletic's short history, as the club finish dead last in both the Eastern Conference and league as a whole, as they picked up just 18 points, 23 behind the playoff positions.

=== Brendan Burke era ===
==== 2024 ====
On December 12, 2023, Brendan Burke was announced as the new head coach and general manager. The offseason saw a large overhaul of the squad, with 23 new signings before the season, including former Sporting CP goalkeeper Renan Ribeiro and 2017 MLS Cup winner Jay Chapman. Hartford began the 2024 season with back-to-back wins, something they hadn't achieved since September 2022. However, a run of poor form between April and July saw the club pick up just nine points in 15 matches and slip down the table. In mid-summer though, a goalless draw vs. Phoenix Rising on July 26 began a great run for Hartford, as they lost just one of their next 11 matches (a 3–0 loss away at rivals Rhode Island FC). With two matches left in the season, Hartford essentially controlled their own destiny, as two wins would've gotten them into the playoffs. However, a 2–2 draw at Tampa Bay Rowdies and a 3–2 loss at Orange County saw Hartford's season come to an end, as they ultimately finished four points out of the playoffs. At the end of the season, it was announced that Danny Barrera, who had been with the club since its inaugural season in 2019, would not return to the club after the expiration of his contract.

==== 2025 ====
Ahead of Brendan Burke's second season in charge, Hartford maintained a strong core of players from the previous season. However, starting goalkeeper Renan Ribeiro had his contract terminated by mutual consent before the season started. Notable pre-season signings included Sebastian Anderson, who played under Burke at Colorado Springs Switchbacks FC, and former Cuban international Adrián Diz. After a 4–0 win at home against New Mexico United, Mamadou Dieng became the top scorer in club history.

Hartford Athletic won their first trophy in club history on October 4, 2025, in the 2025 USL Cup final. After defeating San Antonio FC in the quarterfinals and Greenville Triumph SC in the semifinals, Hartford defeated Sacramento Republic FC 1–0 at Heart Health Park in the final thanks to a second-half goal from Samuel Careaga.

Hartford qualified for the playoffs for the second time after a 3–2 win over Sacramento. They were eliminated in the Eastern Conference Quarterfinals against eventual USL champions Pittsburgh Riverhounds in a penalty shootout, 4-2, after the match ended in a scoreless draw.

In May 2025, the team announced that they would add a women's team competing in the USL W League for the 2026 season.

==== 2026 ====
In the 2026 season, Hartford Athletic once again reached the final of the USL Cup. The match was played at Trinity Health Stadium and marked the first professional championship game - in a series or in a one-off game - played in the city of Hartford since the 2000 Calder Cup Playoffs. It also marked the first championship-deciding match played in Connecticut in the state's professional sports history. In the 2026 USL Cup Final, Hartford Athletic lost 1-0 to Louisville City FC.

== Stadium ==
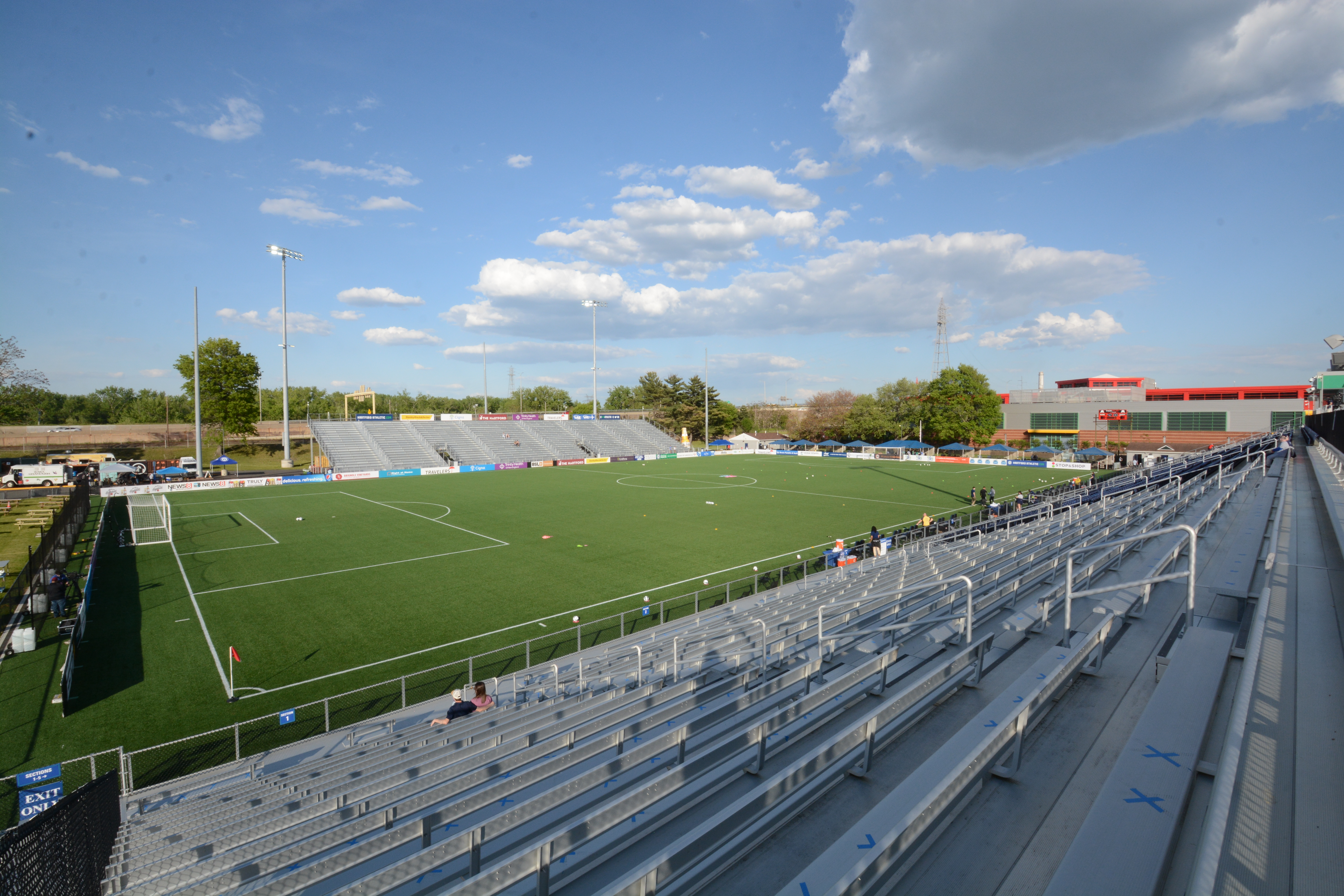
Trinity Health Stadium in 2021

The club plays on the grounds of Trinity Health Stadium, with a capacity of 5,500. The 1935 stadium was renovated and reopened on July 13, 2019, despite the fact the stadium was not completely finished. Lights were completed and first used for the stadium's first night game on September 14, 2019 (Hartford Athletic vs. Louisville City).

2024 saw the addition of VIP suites in the south end of the stadium, adding approximately 200 seats.

During the construction of Trinity Health Stadium, Athletic played home games at Pratt & Whitney Stadium at Rentschler Field. They played their first home game in front of more than 11,000 supporters.

Hartford's first U.S. Open Cup match in 2019, which was also the first win in club history, was played at Al-Marzook Field in West Hartford.

== Colors and badge ==
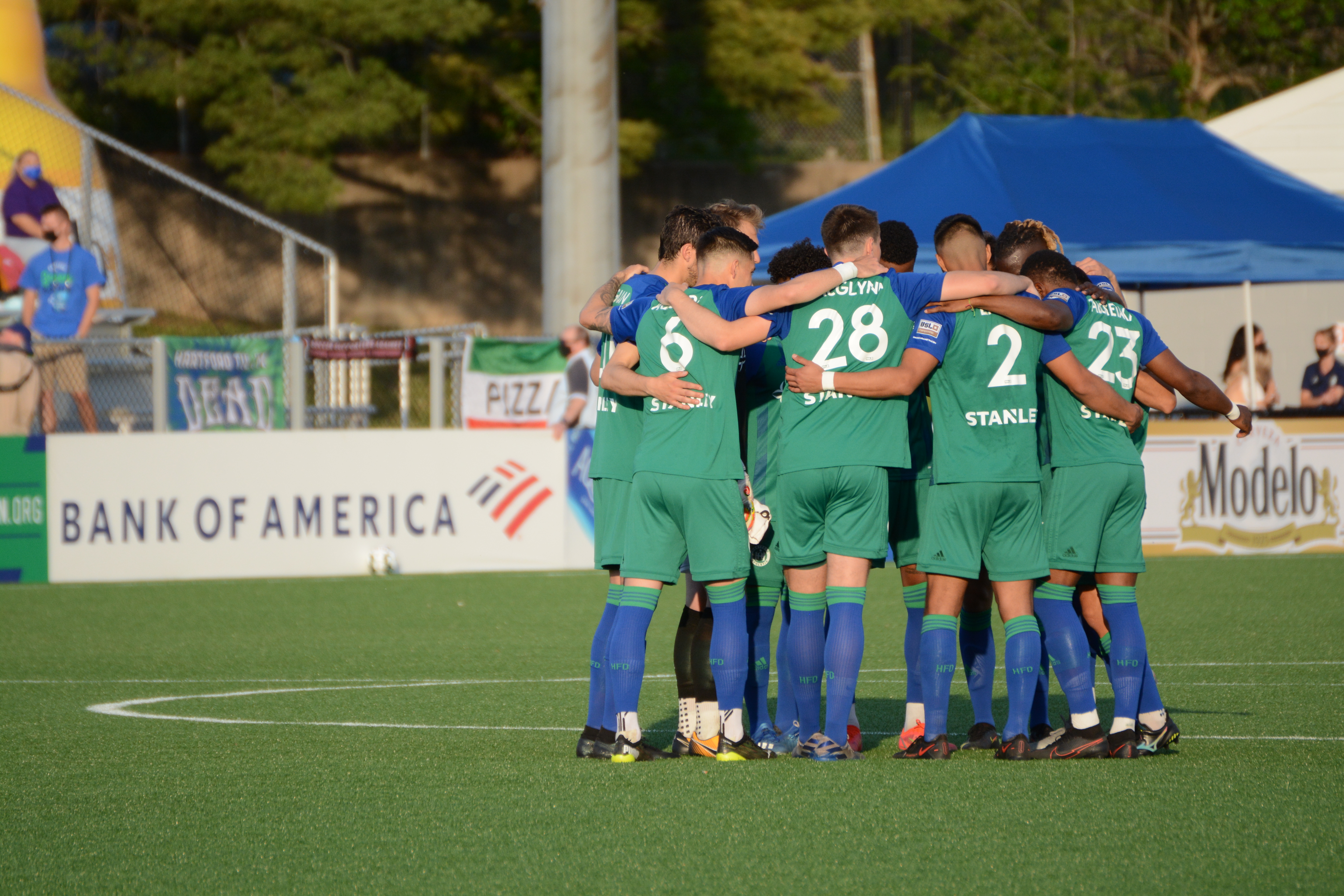
Hartford Athletic players before a 2021 match

Hartford Athletic's official colors are green and blue, chosen because of their strong association with the sports teams of Hartford. The team's crest and colors were first unveiled in a video on December 6, 2018.

=== Kit history ===
Home, away, and third kits.

- Home

2019	2020–21	2022	2023–24	2025–26

- Away

2019	2020–21	2022–23	2024–25	2026–

- Third

2021

=== Sponsorship ===
Season	Kit manufacturer	Shirt sponsor
2019–2021	(Germany) Adidas	Trinity Health of New England
2022–	(Denmark) Hummel	Trinity Health of New England

== Charity ==
=== Match for a Cause ===
Every year, Hartford Athletic collaborates with sponsors to raise money for local charities with their "Match for a Cause". Special edition jerseys are designed, worn for a game, autographed by players, then auctioned off. All proceeds from the auctioned off jerseys are then donated to a local charity. Most recently, in 2025, Hartford Athletic partnered with Liberty Bank to raise money for the American Cancer Society.

=== Green and Blue Foundation ===
Hartford Athletic established the Green and Blue Foundation in 2020, aiming to improve the quality of life of youth and disadvantaged people in the state of Connecticut. This includes:

- Creating programs to improve health, education, and support for people in need.
- Educating local youth and disadvantaged people on important subjects such as employment, health, fitness, safety, nutrition, and the environment as well as providing internships and work opportunities.
- Funding participation in youth soccer through scholarships and grants, allowing young players to take part in both instructional and competitive programs despite financial barriers they may face.
- Conducting events to teach youth soccer or providing funding for events which do so.
- Helping amateur soccer teams and players by covering costs like equipment, injury help, transportation, and coaching.
- Inspiring a love of the game by providing tickets to matches to youth and amateur soccer players.

== Players and staff ==
=== Men's roster ===
As of October 31, 2026

Note: Flags indicate national team as defined under FIFA eligibility rules; some limited exceptions apply. Players may hold more than one non-FIFA nationality.

No.	Pos.	Nation	Player
1	GK	BRA	Enzo Carvalho
2	DF	USA	Sebastian Anderson
3	DF	USA	Matt Real
4	DF	JAM	Jordan Scarlett
5	DF	GAM	Baboucarr Njie
6	MF	COD	Beverly Makangila
7	MF	NGR	Michael Adedokun (on loan from Lexington SC)
8	MF	GBS	Junior Moreira
9	FW	SLE	Augustine Williams
10	MF	ARG	Samuel Careaga
11	FW	COD	Michee Ngalina
15	DF	CUB	Adrián Diz
16	MF	IRL	Barry Coffey

No.	Pos.	Nation	Player
17	FW	UGA	Sadat Anaku
18	MF	CYP	Christos Hadjipaschalis
19	MF	SLE	Emmanuel Samadia
21	MF	USA	Ben Mines (on loan from Las Vegas Lights)
22	DF	USA	TJ Presthus
24	DF	USA	Galen Flynn
25	DF	USA	Britton Fischer (on loan from Minnesota United)
27	FW	USA	Spencer Gordon
28	DF	USA	Cesar Miranda
29	FW	NGR	Abdullah Taofeek
77	GK	CMR	Antony Siaha
81	FW	NGR	Adewale Obalola
47	DF	USA	Oscar Pearman

1. USL Academy Contract

=== Team management ===
Front office
Owners	Joseph Calafiore; Bruce Mandell; Scott Schooley
Coaching staff
Head coach	Brendan Burke
Assistant coach	Aaron Wheeler
Goalkeeper coach	Dan Gaspar
Strength & conditioning coach	Joe Lucas Santos
First team data analyst	Michael Pace
Athletic trainer	Mike Dias
Equipment manager	Marcello Delvalle
Women's head coach	Danny Barrera

Last updated: February 17, 2026

=== Club captains ===
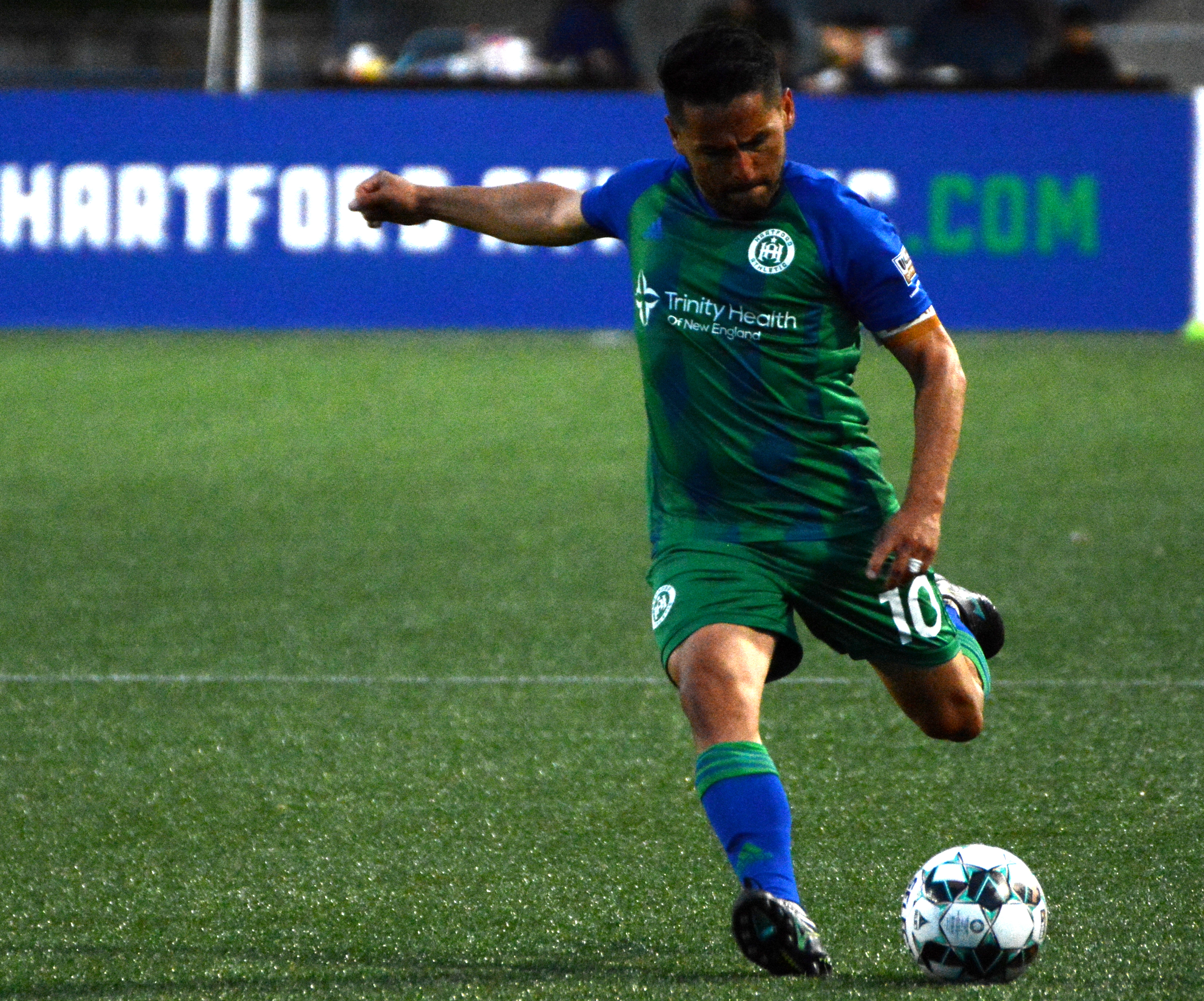
Danny Barrera (pictured in 2021) served as captain from 2020 through 2022.

Years	Name	Nation
2019	Philip Rasmussen	Denmark
2020–2022	Danny Barrera	United States
2023	Niall Logue	Northern Ireland
2024–present	Jordan Scarlett	Jamaica

== Club culture ==
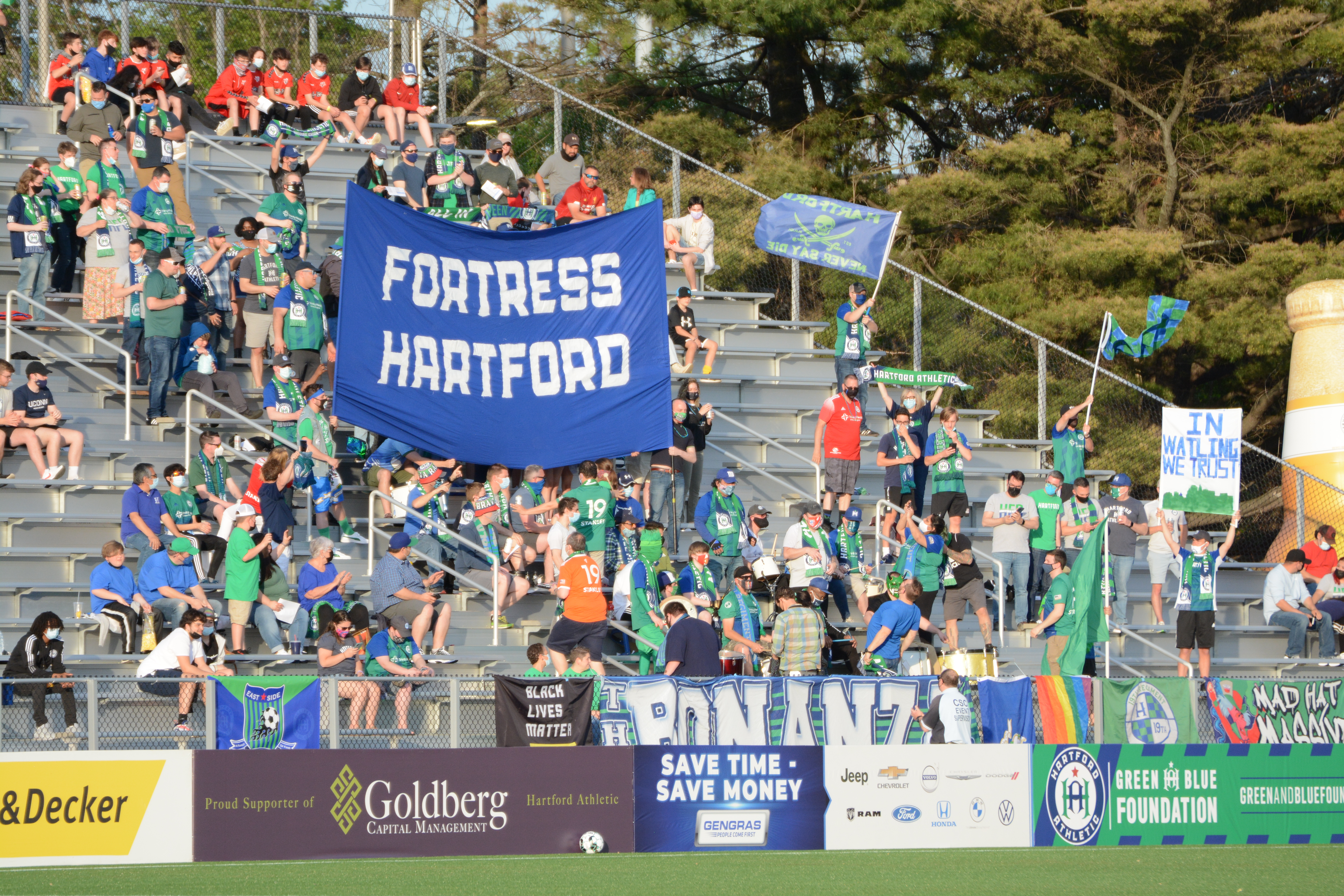
Supporters at a 2021 match

=== Supporters ===
There are two primary Hartford Athletic supporters groups:

- The Bonanza is a unified independent supporters group formed in 2022 from the merger of The 19th Regiment, Mad Hat Massive, and Elm City Casuals.
- Raza Brava is Latino-centric supporters group representing the greater Hartford area.

Each group is separately managed but they stand and chant together on the east end of Trinity Health Stadium for home matches.

Among the notable chants used is the "Brass Bonanza," a melody sung by the supporters groups after scoring a goal, which was also used for the former NHL team in the city, the Hartford Whalers, for the same circumstances. The groups also use Bob Marley's classic "Three Little Birds" for the beginning of matches and when the opposing team scores.

=== Rivalries ===
==== Rhode Island FC ====
- El Clamico

In the early years, the club didn't have much of a direct rival, with New York Red Bulls II being the only nearby club. However, with the addition of Rhode Island FC in 2024, the two sides developed a natural regional rivalry, being the only two USL Championship clubs in New England. In 2024, the two sides played to a 1–1 draw in Hartford, before Rhode Island won 3–0 in the reverse fixture.

On July 19, 2025, the two clubs played at Centreville Bank Stadium for the first time. The match ended 0–0, but saw 27 combined fouls. Additionally, the celebrations and antics of Hartford goalkeeper Anthony Siaha directed towards Rhode Island fans and postmatch violence from Rhode Island fans gained notable media attention. The two clubs played the very next week in the final group stage matchday of the 2025 USL Cup. In another physical match (31 total fouls), that included a red card from Hartford's Beverly Makangila and Rhode Island fans booing Siaha when he got the ball, both sides came back from a goal down as the match finished 2–2. In the ensuing penalty shootout, Hartford won 4–3 to keep their hopes of advancing alive. On Saturday, August 23, 2025, Hartford Athletic beat RIFC 3-0 including a red card on Rhode Island player Aldair Giovanni Sanchez in the 84th minute. This was the first regulation win against Rhode Island by Hartford.

==== Others ====
In the 2023 U.S. Open Cup third round, Hartford Athletic played away at New England Revolution in the first competitive match against another team from New England. Hartford lost 2–1.

The 2025 season saw Hartford Athletic play another New England team, Portland Hearts of Pine, in the USL Cup group stage (a 2–0 win) and U.S. Open Cup second round (a 1–1 draw followed by a 4–2 loss on penalties).

There are five other notable soccer clubs in the state of Connecticut: CT United FC in MLS Next Pro, AC Connecticut and Connecticut Rush in USL League Two, New Haven United FC in the NPSL, and independent club Hartford City FC. Hartford Athletic have shared Trinity Health Stadium with AC Connecticut and Hartford City at various points in their history, but have never played another Connecticut club in a competitive match.

In a 2025 USL Championship match against the Pittsburgh Riverhounds, Marlon Hairston accused Danny Griffin of using a racial slur. Additionally, there were multiple instances of fan violence, both physical and verbal.

In 2026, the women's team will face AC Connecticut 3 times.

== Honors ==
=== Cup ===
- USL Cup
  - Winners (1): 2025
  - Runners-Up (1): 2026

== Women's team ==
=== First iteration (2021) ===
On June 8, 2021, Hartford Athletic announced they will be fielding a women's side to compete in the new USL W League beginning in 2022. The team, which plays under the AC Connecticut name, has never made the playoffs.

==== List of seasons ====
Year	League	Reg. season	Playoffs
2022	USL W League	5th Metropolitan	DNQ
2023	USL W League	8th Metropolitan	DNQ
2024	USL W League	7th Metropolitan	DNQ
2025	Did not compete		
2026	USL W League	3rd, Northeast	DNQ

=== Second iteration (2025) ===
Hartford Athletic women
- Full name: Hartford Athletic women
- Founded: May 1, 2025; 18 months ago
- Stadium: Trinity Health Stadium
- Capacity: 5,500
- Owner: Hartford Sports Group
- Head coach: Danny Barrera
- League: USL W League
- 2026: TBD
- Website: hartfordathletic.com

On May 1, 2025, Hartford Athletic announced for the second time that they would be having a women's team join the USL W League beginning in 2026.

==== Women's roster ====
As of May 20, 2026

Note: Flags indicate national team as defined under FIFA eligibility rules; some limited exceptions apply. Players may hold more than one non-FIFA nationality.

No.	Pos.	Nation	Player
0	GK	USA	Lana Gibbs
3	GK	USA	Katrina Chorzepa
—	FW	USA	Maggie Kershnar
7	FW	USA	Mya Johnson
9	FW	USA	Shea Kelleher
10	FW	USA	Juliana Garcia
18	FW	USA	Rachel Wygant
23	FW	USA	Rebecca Frisk
5	MF	USA	Ashley Reyes
6	MF	USA	Natalie Chudowsky

No.	Pos.	Nation	Player
11	MF	CIV	Jocyline Koffi
13	MF	GHA	Diana Baffor
15	MF	USA	Taylor Jenkins
16	MF	USA	Emma Gregorski
19	MF	USA	Alex Ackerman
24	MF	USA	Olivia Beauvois
30	MF	USA	Sam Halligan
—	DF	USA	Janayah Body
17	DF	USA	Riley Prozzo
21	DF	USA	Domi Richardson

== Reserve team ==
Hartford Athletic II plays in the United Premier Soccer League New England South Conference premier division. The club plays their home matches at Trinity Health Stadium.

== Team records ==
=== Year-by-year ===
This is a partial list of the last five seasons completed by the club. For the full season-by-season history, see List of Hartford Athletic seasons.

Season	USL Championship								Play-offs	U.S. Open Cup	USL Cup	Top Scorer	
Season	P	W	L	D	GF	GA	Pts	Position	Play-offs	U.S. Open Cup	USL Cup	Player	Goals
2021	32	12	15	5	50	50	41	5th, Atlantic	Did not qualify	Not played	N/A	(Honduras) Juan Carlos Obregón Jr.	10
2022	34	10	18	6	47	57	36	10th, Eastern	Did not qualify	Third round	N/A	(Cuba) Ariel Martínez	9
2023	34	4	24	6	40	79	18	12th, Eastern	Did not qualify	Third round	N/A	(Liberia) Prince Saydee	10
2024	34	12	14	8	37	51	44	10th, Eastern	Did not qualify	Third round	N/A	(Senegal) Mamadou Dieng	11
2025	30	13	12	5	48	36	44	5th, Eastern	Conference Quarterfinals	Second round	Champion	(Saint Vincent and the Grenadines) Kyle Edwards	12

=== Head coaches ===
- Includes USL regular season, USL playoffs, U.S. Open Cup. Excludes friendlies.

Coach	Nationality	Start	End	Games	Win	Loss	Draw	Win %
Jimmy Nielsen	Denmark	September 5, 2018	October 27, 2019	36	9	22	5	25.00
Radhi Jaïdi	Tunisia	November 8, 2019	October 19, 2020	17	11	4	2	64.71
Harry Watling	England	January 13, 2021	June 25, 2022	49	16	25	8	32.65
Ray Reid (interim)	United States	June 25, 2022	August 22, 2022	13	4	6	3	30.77
Tab Ramos	United States	August 22, 2022	June 26, 2023	24	6	14	4	25.00
Omid Namazi	United States	June 26, 2023	November 1, 2023	18	2	14	2	11.11
Brendan Burke	United States	December 12, 2023	present	75	31	29	15	41.33

=== Average attendance ===
Year	Reg. Season	Playoffs
2019	5,025	—
2020	1,351	2,194
2021	3,780	—
2022	4,956	—
2023	4,881	—
2024	4,993	—
2025	4,914	—

=== Records ===
- Mamadou Dieng currently holds the record for most goals scored for Hartford Athletic, with 23 goals.
- Danny Barrera is the top assister in club history, dishing out 36 assists while playing for Hartford Athletic.
- Barrera also holds the record for most appearances for Hartford Athletic, playing 156 times for the club.
- Hartford Athletic's biggest win came against New York Red Bulls II, when they beat them 7–0 on June 6, 2021.
- On April 28, 2024, Hartford fell to Louisville City FC 0–6 in what was their biggest loss in club history.
- Mamadou Dieng was also Hartford Athletic's biggest sale in club history, when he signed for Minnesota United FC for a reported fee of around $300k.

=== Notable Former Players ===
Player	Time with Team	Accomplishments
Danny Barrera	2019-2024	7th most assists in USL Championship History; Most appearances in club history; First club captain; First head coach of women's team
Justin Haak	2020-2021	Played for 2 seasons on loan from New York City FC; First former Hartford player to play and score in the MLS
Mamadou Dieng	2024-2025	Top scorer in club history (23 goals); Biggest sale in club history; First non-loan player to player to play in the MLS

== See also ==
- Hartford City FC
- CT United FC
- AC Connecticut
- AC Connecticut women
