= Kyle Edwards (footballer, born 1997) =

Vincentian footballer (born 1997)

Personal information
- Full name: Kyle Lyndon Adonis Sanchez Edwards
- Date of birth: 15 January 1997 (age 29)
- Place of birth: Saint Vincent and the Grenadines
- Height: 6 ft 1 in (1.85 m)
- Position: Forward

Team information
- Current team: Sacramento Republic FC
- Number: 71

College career
Years	Team	Apps	(Gls)
2016–2017	Ranger College Rangers	24	(30)
2018–2019	UTRGV Vaqueros	33	(21)

Senior career*
Years	Team	Apps	(Gls)
2013–2015	System 3		
2015–2017	Grenades		
2017	System 3		
2018	Houston Dutch Lions	4	(3)
2019	Brazos Valley Cavalry	11	(14)
2020–2021	Rio Grande Valley FC	23	(6)
2022	Houston Dynamo 2	12	(5)
2023–2026	Hartford Athletic	67	(22)
2026–	Sacramento Republic FC	28	(10)

International career^{‡}
2014–	Saint Vincent and the Grenadines	34	(6)
- * Club domestic league appearances and goals as of 11:57, 11 November 2026 (UTC) ‡ National team caps and goals as of 10 October 2025

Kyle Lyndon Adonis Sanchez Edwards (born 15 March 1997) is a Vincentian footballer who plays for Sacramento Republic FC and the Saint Vincent and the Grenadines national football team.

== Career ==
=== Caribbean ===
Edwards played for System 3 in the NLA Premier League and Grenades in the Antigua and Barbuda Premier Division.

=== United States college and amateur ===
In the United States, Edwards played two years of college soccer at Ranger College, before transferring to the University of Texas Rio Grande Valley in 2017, where he played for two seasons.

While at college, Edwards appeared for National Premier Soccer League side Houston Dutch Lions in 2018, and with USL League Two side Brazos Valley Cavalry in 2019, where he jointly won the league Golden Boot award. He also spent time with System 3 and Grenades during the summers.

=== Professional ===
On 7 January 2020, Edwards signed for USL Championship side Rio Grande Valley FC. On 13 January 2020, Houston Dynamo drafted Edwards 86th overall in the 2020 MLS SuperDraft.

On 7 December 2022, it was announced Edwards would join USL Championship side Hartford Athletic for their 2023 season.

On January 15, 2026, Kyle Edwards joined USL Championship side Sacramento Republic FC for the 2026 season.

== International ==
Since 2014, Edwards has played with the Saint Vincent and the Grenadines national team.
