= 2026 Orange County SC season =

Orange County SC
2026 season
- Owner: James Keston
- Manager: Danny Stone (until September 21); Dekel Keinan (interim since September 21)
- Stadium: Championship Soccer Stadium; Irvine, California
- USL Championship: Western Conference: 9th
- USL Championship Playoffs: Did Not Qualify
- U.S. Open Cup: Second Round
- 2026 USL Cup: Group Stage
- Top goalscorer: League: All: Yaniv Bazini (10)
- Highest home attendance: 6,500 (twice)
- Lowest home attendance: 1,521 (March 18, against Laguna United FC)
- Average home league attendance: 4,499
Home colors	Away colors

The 2026 Orange County SC season was the club's sixteenth season of existence, and their sixteenth consecutive season in the United Soccer League Championship, the second tier of American soccer.

Over the offseason, Orange County SC announced that they'd expand their long-time home Championship Soccer Stadium, where they've played matches since 2017, to accommodate the rapid increase of fan attendance. Towards the end of the season following a stretch of seven matches winless, Orange County fired head coach Danny Stone, who had led the club since 2024, and replaced him with an interim coach, Dekel Keinan.

== Roster ==
As of March 11, 2026

Note: Flags indicate national team as defined under FIFA eligibility rules; some limited exceptions apply. Players may hold more than one non-FIFA nationality.

No.	Pos.	Nation	Player
1	GK	USA	Alex Rando
2	DF	USA	Grayson Doody
4	DF	USA	Nico Benalcazar
5	DF	ENG	Tom Brewitt (Captain)
6	DF	USA	Garrison Tubbs (on loan from D.C. United)
8	MF	SEN	Ousmane Sylla
9	FW	USA	Ethan Zubak
10	MF	USA	Chris Hegardt
11	FW	SUI	Lyam MacKinnon
12	FW	ISR	Yaniv Bazini
13	DF	USA	Pedro Guimaraes
14	MF	USA	Brandon Cambridge
15	DF	USA	Tyson Espy
17	FW	USA	Jamir Johnson

No.	Pos.	Nation	Player
18	MF	USA	Marcelo Palomino
19	MF	USA	Kevin Partida
20	FW	CAN	Mataeo Bunbury
21	FW	JPN	Mouhamadou War
22	FW	USA	Apolo Marinch
23	DF	NOR	Ryan Doghman
25	MF	USA	Efren Solis
27	MF	SCO	Stephen Kelly
29	MF	USA	Oliver Kurnik
31	GK	JPN	Tetsuya Kadono
32	DF	USA	Nicola Ciotta
35	GK	USA	Fernando Aguirre

=== Academy ===
Note: Flags indicate national team as defined under FIFA eligibility rules; some limited exceptions apply. Players may hold more than one non-FIFA nationality.

No. / Pos. / Nation / Player; 25 / MF / USA / Efren Solis	No. / Pos. / Nation / Player; 39 / GK / USA / Adoniayah Aemiro

=== Out on Loan ===
Note: Flags indicate national team as defined under FIFA eligibility rules; some limited exceptions apply. Players may hold more than one non-FIFA nationality.

No.	Pos.	Nation	Player
24	FW	USA	Benjamin Barjolo (on loan to Union Omaha)

=== Technical staff ===
Role	Name
President of Soccer Operations & General Manager	Peter Nugent
Head Coach	Danny Stone
Assistant Coach	Didier Crettenand
Goalkeeping Coach	Victor Nogueira
Performance Data Analyst	Amanda Preciado
Performance Consultant	Dan Guzman
Head Academy Scout	Shawn Beyer
Team Operations Coordinator	Mario Lemus

== Competitions ==
=== Exhibitions ===
In preparation for the 2026 USL Championship season, Orange County played in pre-season friendlies, mainly against MLS and USL teams.

January 24	Los Angeles FC	1–0	Orange County SC	Los Angeles, CA
		Report

February 4	LA Galaxy	2–0	Orange County SC	Carson, CA
11:00 AM				Stadium: Dignity Health Sports Park

February 7 Coachella Valley Invitational	Orange County SC	1–1	Real Salt Lake	Irvine, California
				Stadium: Championship Soccer Stadium

February 11	Orange County SC	1–1	El Paso Locomotive FC	Irvine, CA
7:00 PM				Stadium: Championship Soccer Stadium

February 21	Orange County SC	0–3	Ventura County FC	Irvine, CA
12:00 PM				Stadium: Championship Soccer Stadium

February 21	Orange County SC	0–1	AV Alta FC	Irvine, CA
7:00 PM				Stadium: Championship Soccer Stadium

February 28	Orange County SC	2–3	UCLA Bruins	Irvine, CA
7:00 PM				Stadium: Championship Soccer Stadium

=== USL Championship ===
==== Standings ====
Pos	Team	Pld	W	L	T	GF	GA	GD	Pts	Qualification
7	FC Tulsa	30	11	9	10	34	31	+3	43	Playoffs
8	Phoenix Rising FC	30	11	10	9	45	46	−1	42	Playoffs
9	Orange County SC	30	10	11	9	39	49	−10	39	
10	Oakland Roots SC	30	9	10	11	39	40	−1	38	
11	Las Vegas Lights FC	30	10	14	6	41	48	−7	36	

Updated to match(es) played on October 24, 2026. Source: USL Championship Standings
Rules for classification: 1) total wins against conference opponents; 2) goal differential against conference opponents; 3) goals scored against conference opponents; 4) head-to-head points against conference opponents; 5) points per game against conference opponents; 6) points per game against non-conference opponents; 7) fewest disciplinary points; 8) coin toss or drawing of lots

==== Match results ====
On December 16, 2025, the USL Championship released the schedule for all 25 teams for both the regular season and the USL Cup.

All times are in Pacific Time.

===== March =====
March 7 1	Orange County SC	1–1	Las Vegas Lights FC	Irvine, CA
7:00 PM	MacKinnon 22'	Report	Pickering 84'	Stadium: Championship Soccer Stadium; Attendance: 3,475; Referee: Abdou Ndiaye

March 14 2	Phoenix Rising FC	1–1	Orange County SC	Phoenix, AZ
7:00 PM	Sacko 38'; Carvajal (yellow card) 43' (yellow-red card) 45'	Report	Tubbs (yellow card) 65' (yellow-red card) 85'; Benalcazar 90+3'	Stadium: Phoenix Rising Soccer Stadium; Attendance: 6,026; Referee: Cristian Campo Hernández

March 21 3	Orange County SC	1–0	Colorado Springs Switchbacks FC	Irvine, CA
7:00 PM	Espy 88'	Report		Stadium: Championship Soccer Stadium; Attendance: 3,510; Referee: Brandon Stevis

March 28 4	Oakland Roots SC	0–1	Orange County SC	Oakland, California
7:00 PM	Spiegel (red card) 90+4'	Report	Bunbury 47'	Stadium: Oakland Coliseum; Attendance: 6,724; Referee: Corbyn May

===== April =====
April 4 5	Orange County SC	0–1	New Mexico United	Irvine, CA
7:00 PM		Report	Reid-Stephen 32' (pen.)	Stadium: Championship Soccer Stadium; Attendance: 3,726; Referee: Thomas Snyder

April 8 6	Orange County SC	2–0	San Antonio FC	Irvine, CA
7:00 PM	Mackinnon 11'; Bazini 34'	Report		Stadium: Championship Soccer Stadium; Attendance: 2,979; Referee: Natalie Simon

April 11 7	FC Tulsa	0–1	Orange County SC	Tulsa, OK
5:00 PM		Report	MacKinnon 55'	Stadium: ONEOK Field; Attendance: 4,004; Referee: Alyssa Pennington

April 18 8	Orange County SC	0–0	Lexington SC	Irvine, CA
7:00 PM		Report		Stadium: Championship Soccer Stadium; Attendance: 4,077; Referee: Muhammad Hassan

===== May =====
May 2 9	Sacramento Republic FC	3–2	Orange County SC	Sacramento, CA
7:00 PM	Rodríguez 57'; Edwards 88'; Benítez 90+5'	Report	Kelly 22'; Bazini 73'	Stadium: Heart Health Park; Attendance: 10,248; Referee: Jeremy Scheer

May 8 10	Colorado Springs Switchbacks FC	2–2	Orange County SC	Colorado Springs, CO
6:00 PM	Bennett 45+6' (pen.); Magee 90+6'	Report	Hegardt 22'; Sylla 65'	Stadium: Weidner Field; Attendance: 6,883; Referee: Atahan Yaya

May 23 11	Orange County SC	3–2	Oakland Roots SC	Santa Ana, CA
7:00 PM	Benalcazar 8'; Kelly 50'; Sylla 87'	Report	Prentice 40'; Wilson 56'	Stadium: Santa Ana Stadium; Attendance: 7,651; Referee: Igor Bych
Note: Match moved from Irvine to Santa Ana to accommodate the USMNT using Championship Soccer Stadium & Great Park as their World Cup base camp.

===== June =====
June 13 12	New Mexico United	1–1	Orange County SC	Albuquerque, NM
6:30 PM	Keller 2'	Report	Benalcazar 18'	Stadium: Isotopes Park; Attendance: 8,843; Referee: Elton García

June 20 13	Las Vegas Lights FC	2–3	Orange County SC	Las Vegas, NV
7:30 PM	Anderson 38'; Rodriguez 66'	Report	Mackinnon 45'; Bazini 55'; Tubbs 76'	Stadium: Cashman Field; Attendance: 2,791; Referee: Gerald Flores

June 24 14	Miami FC	2–4	Orange County SC	Miami, FL
6:00 PM	Milesi 14'; Ndongo 82'	Report	Bazini 44', 60'; Kelly 55'; Solis 90+4'	Stadium: Pitbull Stadium; Attendance: 665; Referee: Alex Billeter

===== July =====
July 4 15	Rhode Island FC	1–1	Orange County SC	Pawtucket, RI
4:30 PM	Holstad (yellow card) 9'; Rodríguez (yellow card) 20'; Bacharach 51' (yellow card) 61'	Report	Ciotta (yellow card) 39'; Tubbs (yellow card) 45+4'; Sylla 67'	Stadium: Centreville Bank Stadium; Attendance: 9,097; Referee: John Griggs

July 8 16	Hartford Athletic	2–2	Orange County SC	Hartford, CT
4:00 PM	Coffey 69', 85'	Report	Kelly 9'; Sylla 17'	Stadium: Trinity Health Stadium; Attendance: 1,900; Referee: Rodrigo Albuquerque

July 25 17	Monterey Bay FC	1–2	Orange County SC	Seaside, CA
7:00 PM	Gindiri 88'	Report	Brewitt 48'; Gordon 51' (o.g.)	Stadium: Cardinale Stadium; Attendance: 3,800; Referee: Brad Jensen

===== August =====
August 1 18	Orange County SC	2–0	El Paso Locomotive FC	Irvine, CA
7:00 PM	Sylla 26'; Tubbs 61'	Report		Stadium: Championship Soccer Stadium; Attendance: 5,008; Referee: Corbyn May

August 8 19	Orange County SC	0–3	Tampa Bay Rowdies	Irvine, CA
7:00 PM		Report	Myers 24' (pen.); Micaletto 58'; Henderlong 89'	Stadium: Championship Soccer Stadium; Attendance: 3,976; Referee: Brandon Stevis

August 15 20	Orange County SC	2–3	Louisville City FC	Irvine, CA
7:00 PM	Sylla 70'; Bazini 81' (pen.)	Report	Serrano Lopez 6', 48'; Donovan 68'	Stadium: Championship Soccer Stadium; Attendance: 3,923; Referee: Trevor Wiseman

August 22 21	Orange County SC	1–5	FC Tulsa	Irvine, CA
7:00 PM	Hegardt 47'	Report	Ordóñez 4', 20', 55'; Pierre 69'; Dorsey 72'	Stadium: Championship Soccer Stadium; Attendance: 4,913; Referee: Muhammad Kaleia

August 29 22	Oakland Roots SC	1–1	Orange County SC	Oakland, CA
5:00 PM	Valot 20'	Report	Bazini 60'	Stadium: Oakland Coliseum; Attendance: 7,063; Referee: Nabil Bensalah

===== September =====
September 5 23	Orange County SC	1–1	Sacramento Republic FC	Irvine, CA
7:00 PM	Hegardt 61'	Report	Essel 83'	Stadium: Championship Soccer Stadium; Attendance: 4,193; Referee: Servando Berna Rico

September 12 24	Orange County SC	0–2	Las Vegas Lights FC	Irvine, CA
7:00 PM		Report	Rodriguez 13'; Anderson 90+5'	Stadium: Championship Soccer Stadium; Attendance: 3,990; Referee: Calin Radosav

September 19 25	Lexington SC	6–0	Orange County SC	Lexington, KY
4:00 PM	Goodrum 9', 24', 49'; Epps 15'; Firmino 35'; Tschantret 85'	Report		Stadium: Lexington SC Stadium; Attendance: 4,209; Referee: Mark Verso

September 26 26	Orange County SC	1–0	Pittsburgh Riverhounds SC	Irvine, CA
7:00 PM	Bazini 90'	Report		Stadium: Championship Soccer Stadium; Attendance: 3,882; Referee: Abdou Ndiaye

===== October =====
October 3 27	Orange County SC	1–2	Monterey Bay FC	Irvine, CA
7:00 PM	Sylla 5' (pen.); Brewitt (red card) 45+1'	Report	Lletget 61' (pen.); Farnsworth 65'	Stadium: Championship Soccer Stadium; Attendance: 6,500

October 10 28	El Paso Locomotive FC	2–1	Orange County SC	El Paso, TX
6:00 PM	Moreno 30'; Farkarlun 43'	Report	Hegardt 51'	Stadium: Southwest University Park; Attendance: 4,892; Referee: Carlos Rodriguez

October 17 29	Orange County SC	1–3	Phoenix Rising FC	Irvine, CA
7:00 PM	Bazini 76'	Report	Boye 10'; Sacko 19', 58'	Stadium: Championship Soccer Stadium; Referee: Matthew Corrigan

October 24 30	San Antonio FC	2–1	Orange County SC	San Antonio, TX
5:30 PM		Report		Stadium: Toyota Field; Attendance: 6,069; Referee: Elvis Osmanovic

=== USL Cup ===
Orange County participated in the third edition of the USL Cup, and the second edition to feature teams from both the USL Championship and League One. Following four straight losses, Orange County bowed out of the tournament in the group stage having lost every single match played and exiting with a negative six goal differential.

==== Standings ====
Pos	Lg	Team	Pld	W	PKW	PKL	L	GF	GA	GD	Pts
2	USLC	New Mexico United	4	3	0	0	1	8	5	+3	9
3	USLC	El Paso Locomotive FC	4	2	0	0	2	5	5	0	6
4	USL1	AV Alta FC	4	2	0	0	2	5	6	−1	6
5	USLC	Phoenix Rising FC	4	1	0	0	3	3	8	−5	3
6	USLC	Orange County SC	4	0	0	0	4	3	9	−6	0

==== Group stage ====
April 25	Orange County SC	1–2	El Paso Locomotive FC	Irvine, California
7:00 PM	Doody 51'; Marinch (yellow card) 34' (yellow-red card) 58'	Report	Alfaro 64'; Coronado 78'	Stadium: Championship Soccer Stadium; Attendance: 4,408; Referee: Jaclyn Metz

May 16	Phoenix Rising FC	2–1	Orange County SC	Phoenix, Arizona
7:00 PM	Moursou 28'; Ramirez 68'	Report	Johnson 22'	Stadium: Phoenix Rising Stadium at 38th St/Washington; Attendance: 5,527; Referee: Matthew Thompson

June 6	AV Alta FC	2–1	Orange County SC	Lancaster, California
8:00 PM	Anderson 42'; Aoumaich 76'	Report	Brewitt 27'	Stadium: Lancaster Municipal Stadium; Attendance: 3,206; Referee: Brandon Stevis

July 11	Orange County SC	0–3	Colorado Springs Switchbacks FC	Irvine, California
7:00 PM		Report	Rocha 53'; Masareka 81'; Tejada 90'	Stadium: Championship Soccer Stadium; Attendance: 4,608; Referee: Mark Verso

=== US Open Cup ===
Orange County entered the 2026 US Open Cup at home against fellow Orange County-based club Laguna United FC, an amateur club that plays in the United Premier Soccer League. Following an easy route of Laguna United, Orange County was matched up at home against Phoenix Rising FC, who also plays in the USL Championship. Despite a late goal to send the match to extra time, Orange County ultimately lost in added extra time in the second round, continuing a trend of early exits from the U.S. Open Cup.

March 18 First Round	(California) Orange County SC (USLC)	3–0	(California) Laguna United FC (UPSL)	Irvine, California
10:30 PM ET	Kelly 25'; Doghman 29'; Hegardt 75'	Report		Stadium: Championship Soccer Stadium; Attendance: 1,521; Referee: Juma Abdu-Razzaq

April 1 Second Round	Orange County SC (USLC) (California)	1–2 (a.e.t.)	(Arizona) Phoenix Rising FC (USLC)	Irvine, California
10:00 p.m. ET	Sylla 85'	Report	Studenthofft 35'; Vukovic 96'	Stadium: Championship Soccer Stadium; Referee: Mark Verso
