= 2025 Orange County SC season =

Orange County SC
2025 season
- Owner: James Keston
- Manager: Danny Stone
- Stadium: Championship Soccer Stadium; Irvine, California
- USL Championship: Western Conference: 7th Overall: 13th
- USL Championship Playoffs: Conference Semi-Finals
- U.S. Open Cup: Third round
- USL Cup: Group stage
- Highest home attendance: 5,000 (ten times)
- Lowest home attendance: 3,020 (March 22, against Monterey Bay FC)
- Average home league attendance: 4,470

The 2025 Orange County SC season was the club's fifteenth season of existence, and their fifteenth consecutive season in the United Soccer League Championship, the second tier of American soccer.

After leading the team from out of playoff positioning to the conference semi-finals, former interim head coach Danny Stone became the official head coach of Orange County in the mid-December 2024.

== Roster ==
As of January 19, 2025

Note: Flags indicate national team as defined under FIFA eligibility rules; some limited exceptions apply. Players may hold more than one non-FIFA nationality.

No.	Pos.	Nation	Player
1	GK	USA	Colin Shutler (Captain)
2	DF	USA	Owen Lambe
3	DF	USA	Charlie Asensio
5	DF	USA	Dillon Powers
6	DF	ENG	Andrew Fox
7	FW	USA	Cameron Dunbar
8	MF	USA	Seth Casiple
9	FW	USA	Ethan Zubak
10	MF	USA	Brian Iloski
11	FW	USA	Bryce Jamison
15	MF	USA	Ashish Chattha

No.	Pos.	Nation	Player
17	FW	SLV	Christian Sorto
19	MF	USA	Kevin Partida
21	FW	CMR	Thomas Amang
22	DF	USA	Joseph Buckley
23	DF	NOR	Ryan Doghman
24	FW	USA	Benjamin Barjolo
26	MF	USA	Kyle Scott
33	DF	USA	Ashton Miles
—	MF	USA	Chris Hegardt
—	FW	USA	Tristan Trager

1. USL Academy Contract

=== Technical staff ===
Role	Name
President of Soccer Operations & General Manager	Peter Nugent
Head Coach	Danny Stone
Assistant Coach	Didier Crettenand
Goalkeeping Coach	Victor Nogueira
Performance Data Analyst	Amanda Preciado
Performance Consultant	Dan Guzman
Head Academy Scout	Shawn Beyer
Team Operations Coordinator	Mario Lemus

== Competitions ==
=== Exhibitions ===
In preparation for the 2025 USL Championship season, Orange County played in eight pre-season friendlies, mainly against local collegiate, MLS, and fellow USL teams.

January 25	Orange County SC	1–2	Portland Timbers	Irvine, California
		Report	Rodríguez 83'; Kelsy 84'	Stadium: Championship Soccer Stadium; Attendance: 0

February 1	Orange County SC	3–1	UC Irvine Anteaters	Irvine, California
				Stadium: Championship Soccer Stadium

February 5	Orange County SC	0–2	Sacramento Republic FC	Irvine, California
1:00 PM				Stadium: Championship Soccer Stadium

February 12	Los Angeles FC	v	Orange County SC
Note: Due to unreleased circumstances, Orange County matched up against Real Salt Lake instead of LAFC

February 12	Real Salt Lake	3–1	Orange County SC	Indio, California
		Report		Stadium: Empire Polo Club

February 15	Orange County SC	1–0	AV Alta FC	Irvine, California
				Stadium: Championship Soccer Stadium

February 22	Orange County SC	4–0	Loyola Marymount Lions	Irvine, California
				Stadium: Championship Soccer Stadium

February 23	Orange County SC	0–2	Los Angeles FC 2	Irvine, California
				Stadium: Championship Soccer Stadium

February 28	Orange County SC	5–2	LA Galaxy II	Irvine, California
				Stadium: Championship Soccer Stadium

=== USL Championship ===
==== Standings ====
Pos	Team	Pld	W	L	T	GF	GA	GD	Pts	Qualification
5	Phoenix Rising FC	30	9	8	13	48	48	0	40 (Note: Phoenix Rising FC are ahead of San Antonio FC on head-to-head points: PHX 6, SAN 0.)	Playoffs
6	San Antonio FC	30	11	12	7	39	38	+1	40	Playoffs
7	Orange County SC	30	10	11	9	44	45	−1	39	Playoffs
8	Colorado Springs Switchbacks FC	30	10	13	7	35	47	−12	37	Playoffs
9	Lexington SC	30	9	12	9	31	42	−11	36	

Source: USL Championship Standings
Rules for classification: 1) head-to-head points; 2) head-to-head goal differential; 3) points-per-game within conference; 4) total wins; 5) total goal differential; 6) total goals scored; 7) points earned against top four Conference finishers; 8) disciplinary points; 9) coin toss or drawing of lots

==== Match results ====
On December 19, 2024, the USL Championship released the regular season schedule for all 24 teams.

All times are in Pacific Standard Time.

March 8 1	Orange County SC	4–2	Oakland Roots SC	Irvine, California
	Doghman 28'; Zubak 47'; Benalcazar 52'; Scott 90'+1'	Report	Gibson (yellow card) 3'; Johnson (yellow card) 59'; Gomez (yellow card) 62'; Prentice 71'; Njie 90'+4'	Stadium: Championship Soccer Stadium; Attendance: 5,000; Referee: Ekaterina Koroleva

March 15 2	Orange County SC	2-2	Lexington SC	Irvine, California
7:30 PM	Doody 9'; War 90'+7'	Report	Rodrigues 45'+1'; Epps 53'	Stadium: Championship Soccer Stadium; Attendance: 4,550; Referee: Muhammad Hassan

March 22 3	Orange County SC	0-3	Monterey Bay FC	Irvine, California
	Doghman (red card) 65'	Report	Gindiri 60', 75'; Ivanovic 90'	Stadium: Championship Soccer Stadium; Attendance: 3,020; Referee: Corbyn May

April 5 4	Las Vegas Lights FC	1-0	Orange County SC	Las Vegas, Nevada
7:30 PM	Pickering 90'+3'	Report		Stadium: Cashman Field; Attendance: 2,353; Referee: Brad Jensen

April 12 5	Orange County SC	2-1	Sacramento Republic FC	Irvine, California
7:00 PM	Vitiello 18' (o.g.); Willey 48' (o.g.)	Report	Herrera 56'	Stadium: Championship Soccer Stadium; Attendance: 3,606; Referee: Elton García

April 19 6	Oakland Roots SC	2-0	Orange County SC	Oakland, California
1:00 PM	Prentice 10'; Wilson 31'	Report		Stadium: Oakland Coliseum; Attendance: 6,058; Referee: Alyssa Nichols

May 3 7	Orange County SC	2-1	FC Tulsa	Irvine, California
	Mackinnon 55', 80'	Report	Calheira 74'	Stadium: Championship Soccer Stadium; Attendance: 4,075; Referee: Trevor Wiseman

May 9 8	North Carolina FC	0-1	Orange County SC	Cary, North Carolina
	da Costa 45'	Report		Stadium: First Horizon Stadium; Attendance: 2,788; Referee: Rodrigo Albuquerque

May 17 9	Orange County SC	0-3	New Mexico United	Irvine, California
		Report	Maples 28' (pen.), 53'; Fernando 79'	Stadium: Championship Soccer Stadium; Attendance: 5,000; Referee: John Matto

May 24 10	Orange County SC	3-1	Colorado Springs Switchbacks FC	Irvine, California
	Hegardt 28'; Dunbar 61'; War 90'+3'	Report	Anthony Fontana 66' (yellow card) 56' (yellow-red card) 78'	Stadium: Championship Soccer Stadium; Attendance: 5,000; Referee: Atahan Yaya

June 7 11	Phoenix Rising FC	3-1	Orange County SC	Phoenix, Arizona
	Formella 21'; Essengue 67'; Dennis 72'	Report	Latinovich 58'	Stadium: Phoenix Rising Soccer Stadium; Attendance: 4,193; Referee: Thomas Snyder

June 14 12	El Paso Locomotive FC	0-3	Orange County SC	El Paso, Texas
		Report	Zubak 39', 45'+3'; Dunbar 41'	Stadium: Southwest University Park; Attendance: 4,573; Referee: Edson Carvajal

July 3 13	Loudoun United FC	0-0	Orange County SC	Leesburg, Virginia
	Ryan (red card) 31'	Report		Stadium: Segra Field; Attendance: 3,871; Referee: Benjamin Meyer

July 12 14	Monterey Bay FC	2-1	Orange County SC	Seaside, California
	Ivanovic 39'; Søjberg 54'	Report	Benalcazar 51'; Kelly (red card) 69'	Stadium: Cardinale Stadium; Attendance: 3,080; Referee: Brad Jensen

July 19 15	Orange County SC	4-0	Las Vegas Lights FC	Irvine, California
	Zubak 12'; Doghman 24'; War 41'; Hegardt 89'	Report		Stadium: Championship Soccer Stadium; Attendance: 5,000; Referee: Elton García

July 30 16	Orange County SC	4–1	Phoenix Rising FC	Irvine, California
	Zubak 30'; Doghman 58'; Jamison 72'; Guimaraes 89'	Report	Sacko 68'; Boye (red card)	Stadium: Championship Soccer Stadium; Attendance: 3,536; Referee: Brandon Stevis

August 9 17	Pittsburgh Riverhounds SC	1-1	Orange County SC	Pittsburgh, Pennsylvania
	Vacter 67'	Report	Zubak 40'	Stadium: Highmark Stadium; Attendance: 5,166; Referee: Mark Verso

August 16 18	Colorado Springs Switchbacks FC	0-1	Orange County SC	Colorado Springs, Colorado
		Report	Benalcazar 62'	Stadium: Weidner Field; Attendance: 7,525; Referee: John Griggs

August 20 19	Orange County SC	v	San Antonio FC	Irvine, California
		Report		Stadium: Championship Soccer Stadium
Note: Match rescheduled to October 15 due to San Antonio FC advancing to the quarter-finals of the USL Cup

August 23 20	FC Tulsa	1–0	Orange County SC	Tulsa, Oklahoma
7:30 PM CDT	ElMedkhar 24'	Report	Kelly (red card) 20'	Stadium: ONEOK Field; Attendance: 3,317; Referee: Nabil Bensalah

August 30 21	Orange County SC	4–4	Birmingham Legion FC	Irvine, California
	Miles 24'; Zubak 43' (pen.); Guimaraes 54'; Hegardt 66'	Report	Daley 3'; Damus 28'; Latinovich 52' (o.g.); Tregarthen 62'	Stadium: Championship Soccer Stadium; Attendance: 5,000; Referee: Corbyn May

September 6 22	Detroit City FC	4–1	Orange County SC	Hamtramck, Michigan
4:00 PM	Smith 12' (yellow card) 27'; Yamazaki (yellow card) 22'; Diouf 31'; Cedeño 40'; LeFlore (yellow card) 72'; Villanueva 88'	Report	Zubak 16' (pen.); Latinovich (yellow card) 36'; Benalcazar (yellow card) 56'; Ciotta (yellow card) 60'; Hegardt (yellow card) 86'	Stadium: Keyworth Stadium; Attendance: 5,671; Referee: Edson Carvajal

September 12 23	Lexington SC	1–1	Orange County SC	Lexington, Kentucky
3:00 PM	Ajago 58'	Report	Jamison 45'+3'	Stadium: Lexington SC Stadium; Attendance: 3,503; Referee: Elijio Arreguin

September 20 24	San Antonio FC	3–1	Orange County SC	San Antonio, Texas
	Pacheco 30'; D. Hernandez 47'; J. Hernandez 66'	Report	Benalcazar 54'	Stadium: Toyota Field; Attendance: 5,970; Referee: Joshua Encarnación

September 27 25	Orange County SC	2–2	Charleston Battery	Irvine, California
	Zubak 63', 76' (pen.)	Report	Myers 84' (pen.); Rubin 86'; Torres (red card) 90'+8'	Stadium: Championship Soccer Stadium; Attendance: 5,000; Referee: Natalie Simon

October 1 26	Sacramento Republic FC	2–1	Orange County SC	Sacramento, California
7:15 PM	Wanner 7'; Bennett 87'	Report	Zubak 52' (pen.)	Stadium: Heart Health Park; Attendance: 9,088; Referee: Rodrigo Albuquerque

October 4 27	Orange County SC	0–0	El Paso Locomotive FC	Irvine, California
7:00 PM		Report		Stadium: Championship Soccer Stadium; Attendance: 5,000; Referee: Elton García

October 11 28	New Mexico United	3–3	Orange County SC	Albuquerque, New Mexico
6:00 PM	Hurst 33', 35'; Keller 51'	Report	Trager 15', 39'; Kelly 45'+1'	Stadium: Isotopes Park; Attendance: 8,148; Referee: Thomas Snyder

October 15 19	Orange County SC	1–0	San Antonio FC	Irvine, California
	Sylla 90'+2'	Report		Stadium: Championship Soccer Stadium; Attendance: 4,340; Referee: Greg Dopka
Note: Rescheduled match that was moved from August 20 due to San Antonio FC advancing in the USL Cup

October 18 29	Orange County SC	0–0	Louisville City FC	Irvine, California
7:00 PM		Report		Stadium: Championship Soccer Stadium; Attendance: 5,000; Referee: Matthew Corrigan

October 25 30	Orange County SC	2–1	Indy Eleven	Irvine, California
7:00 PM	Latinovich 23', (yellow card) 80'; Sylla 90+1'	Report	Williams 36', (yellow card) 45+3'; Blake (yellow card) 48'; Ofeimu (yellow card) 72'	Stadium: Championship Soccer Stadium; Attendance: 5,000; Referee: Elvis Osmanovic

==== USL Championship playoffs ====
As the seventh seed in the Western Conference, Orange County qualified for the 2025 USL Championship playoffs, being matched up away against fellow Californian club Sacramento Republic FC for the first time in nine years. Matched up away in Sacramento, Orange County SC played to a scoreless draw through added extra time, ultimately prevailing 5–4 over the home team in a penalty shootout, led by 120th-minute substitute goalkeeper Tetsuya Kadono, who made three saves in the shootout. Following the quarter-finals, Orange County SC was matched up against third seed New Mexico United away in Isotopes Park, where the club would ultimately fall in stoppage time.

November 2, 2025 West Quarter-Finals	Sacramento Republic FC	0–0 (a.e.t.) (4–5 p)	Orange County SC	Sacramento, California
6:00 PM PT	Portillo (yellow card) 11'; Benítez (yellow card) 75'; Willey (yellow card) 90'; López (red card) 105+3'; Cicerone (yellow card) 105+5'; Bennett (yellow card) 107'	Report	Partida (yellow card) 90+3'; Hegardt (red card) 105+3'; War (yellow card) 105+6'	Stadium: Heart Health Park; Attendance: 9,367; Referee: Nabil Bensalah
	Penalties
	Cicerone (penalty missed); Felipe (penalty missed); Ross (penalty scored); Bennett (penalty scored); Spaulding (penalty scored); Desmond (penalty scored); Gurr (penalty missed)		(penalty missed) Zubak; (penalty scored) Dunbar; (penalty scored) Pinto; (penalty missed) Latinovich; (penalty scored) Sylla; (penalty scored) Benalcazar; (penalty scored) Brewitt

November 8, 2025 West Semi-Finals	New Mexico United	2–1	Orange County SC	Albuquerque, New Mexico
9:00 PM ET	Hurst 49'; Maples (yellow card) 90+1'; Harris 90+4'	Report	Pinto 68'	Stadium: Isotopes Park; Attendance: 10,150; Referee: Elton García

=== USL Cup ===
Orange County participated in the second edition of the USL Cup, the first edition to feature teams from both the USL Championship and League One.

==== Standings ====
Pos	Lg	Team	Pld	W	PKW	PKL	L	GF	GA	GD	Pts
2	USLC	Las Vegas Lights FC	4	3	0	0	1	7	6	+1	9
3	USLC	Monterey Bay FC	4	2	0	0	2	6	6	0	6
4	USLC	Orange County SC	4	2	0	0	2	5	6	−1	6
5	USL1	AV Alta FC	4	1	1	0	2	5	6	−1	5
6	USLC	Oakland Roots SC	4	1	0	1	2	5	6	−1	4

Updated to match(es) played on July 26, 2025. Source: USL

==== Group stage ====
April 26, 2025	Orange County SC	1–3	Las Vegas Lights FC	Irvine, California
7:00 PM PDT	Dunbar 45+3' (pen.)	Report	O'Driscoll 14'; Pinzón 34'; Rodriguez 56' (pen.)	Stadium: Championship Soccer Stadium; Attendance: 3,350; Referee: Gerald Flores

May 31, 2025	Monterey Bay FC	3-2	Orange County SC	Seaside, California
7:00 PM PDT	Paul 36', 67'; Larsson 85'	Report	Guimaraes 27'; Dunbar 90+3'	Stadium: Cardinale Stadium; Attendance: 3,006; Referee: Calin Radosav

June 28, 2025	Orange County SC	1–0	Sacramento Republic FC	Irvine, California
7:00 PM PDT	Pedro Guimaraes 90+5'	Report		Stadium: Championship Soccer Stadium; Attendance: 4,328; Referee: Muhammad Kaleia

July 26, 2025	Oakland Roots SC	0–1	Orange County SC	Oakland, California
1:00 PM PDT		Report	Jamison 30'	Stadium: Oakland Coliseum; Attendance: 5,418; Referee: Cristian Campo

=== U.S. Open Cup ===
Orange County, as a member of the second division USL Championship, entered the U.S. Open Cup in the Third Round based on its performance in the 2024 USL Championship season. Drawn away against Division 3 USL League One club AV Alta FC for the first competitive match against the two clubs, the club was eliminated from the U.S. Open Cup after losing in a penalty shootout.

April 15	AV Alta FC (USL1) (California)	2–2 (a.e.t.) (4–2 p)	(California) Orange County SC (USLC)	Lancaster, California
7:00 p.m. PDT	Mastrantonio 67'; Alaribe 75'	Report	Sylla 15'; War 83'	Stadium: Lancaster Municipal Stadium; Referee: Brandon Stevis
	Penalties
	Cerritos (penalty scored); Blancos (penalty scored); Cruz (penalty scored); Pajaro (penalty scored)		(penalty scored) Dunbar; (penalty scored) MacKinnon; (penalty missed) Scott; (penalty missed) Benalcazar
