= 2022 Hartford Athletic season =

Hartford Athletic
2022 season
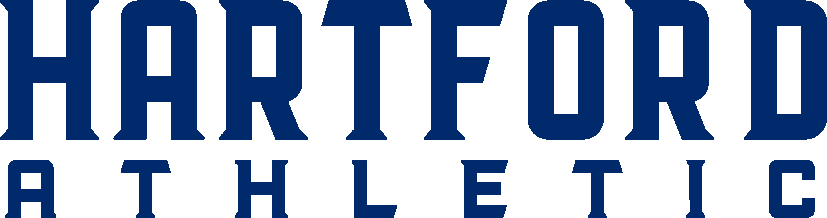
- Owner: Hartford Sports Group
- Head coach: Harry Watling
- Stadium: Trinity Health Stadium
- 2022 U.S. Open Cup: Third Round
- Highest home attendance: League/All: 5,500 (6 times)
- Lowest home attendance: League: 4,628 (7/23 v. PIT); All: 1,634 (4/7 v. OBU, USOC)
- Average home league attendance: 5,163
- Biggest win: ATL 0–3 HFD (6/18); HFD 3–0 LV (9/17); HFD 6–3 CHS (10/1)
- Biggest defeat: SD 3–0 HFD (6/11); LDN 3–0 HFD (9/21)
| Home colors | Away colors |

The 2022 Hartford Athletic season was the club's fourth season of existence and their fourth in the USL Championship, the second tier of American soccer.

Hartford Athletic will also play in the U.S. Open Cup for the second time in club history.

== Transfers ==
=== In ===
| Pos | Player | Transferred from | Fee | Date | Source |
|---|---|---|---|---|---|
| GK | (United States) Austin Pack | Charlotte Independence | Free transfer | January 10, 2022 | |
| MF | (Jamaica) Peter-Lee Vassell | Indy Eleven | Free transfer | January 11, 2022 | |
| FW | (Jamaica) Rashawn Dally | Memphis 901 FC | Free transfer | January 13, 2022 | |
| MF | (Jamaica) Andre Lewis | Colorado Springs Switchbacks FC | Undisclosed | January 18, 2022 | |
| DF | (Liberia) Prince Saydee | Phoenix Rising FC | Free transfer | January 19, 2022 | |
| DF | (The Gambia) Modou Jadama | FC Tulsa | Free transfer | January 24, 2022 | |
| FW | (England) Mitchell Curry | Fort Lauderdale CF | Free transfer | January 27, 2022 | |

==== Out ====
| Pos | Player | Transferred from | Fee | Date | Source |
|---|---|---|---|---|---|
| FW | (El Salvador) Walmer Martinez | Monterey Bay FC | Undisclosed | December 22, 2021 | |

== Roster ==
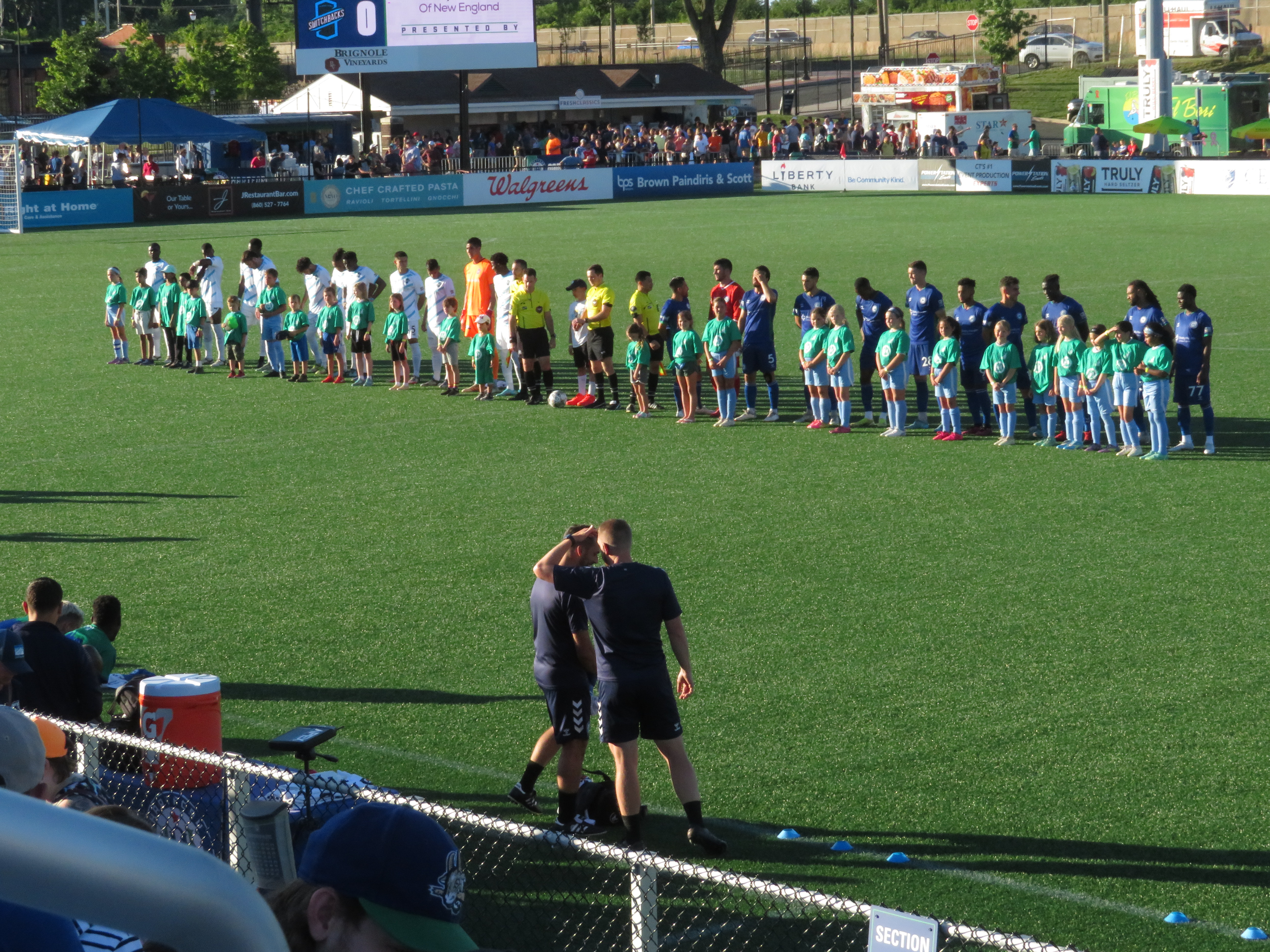
Prematch starting XI lineups for Hartford Athletic versus Colorado Springs Switchbacks FC on June 28 2022

== Competitions ==
=== Exhibitions ===
| February 12 Preseason | Hartford Athletic | 1–1 | Northeastern Huskies | Hartford, Connecticut |
| 5:00 p.m. ET | Brewitt (yellow card) 26'; (yellow card) 57'; 81' (Cedeno); (yellow card) 90' | Report | 60' | Stadium: Dillon Stadium |

| February 19 Preseason | New York Red Bulls II | 2–2 | Hartford Athletic | Whippany, New Jersey |
| 2:00 p.m. ET | Filipe 11'; Brummett 70' | Report | Cedeno 17'; 78' | Stadium: Red Bulls Training Facility |

| February 26 Preseason | New England Revolution II | 1–1 | Hartford Athletic | Foxborough, Massachusetts |
| 2:00 p.m. ET | | | | Stadium: Gillette Stadium |

| March 5 Preseason | UConn Huskies | v | Hartford Athletic | Storrs, Connecticut |
| 4:00 p.m. ET | | | | Stadium: Morrone Stadium |

| March 9 Preseason | Hartford Athletic | v | Newtown Pride | Hartford, Connecticut |
| 7:00 p.m. ET | | | | Stadium: Dillon Stadium |

=== USL Championship ===
==== Regular season ====
| March 19 1 | Pittsburgh Riverhounds SC | 2–1 | Hartford Athletic | Pittsburgh, Pennsylvania |
| 7:00 PM EDT | Dambrot 12'; Dixon (yellow card) 17'; M. Williams (yellow card) 45+1'; Forbes 51'; Sims (yellow card) 68'; Kelly-Rosales (yellow card) 90+2' | Report | Vassell (yellow card) 18' (yellow-red card) 41'; Lewis (yellow card) 34'; Obregón Jr. 40' | Stadium: Highmark Stadium; Attendance: 2,776; Referee: John Matto |

| March 26 2 | Tampa Bay Rowdies | 1–1 | Hartford Athletic | St. Petersburg, Florida |
| 7:00 p.m. ET | LaCava 39'; Antley (yellow card) 52' | Report | Johnson 6', (yellow card) 88'; Boudadi (yellow card) 56'; Pack (yellow card) 79'; Barrera (yellow card) 90'; Curry (yellow card) 90+2' | Stadium: Al Lang Stadium; Attendance: 6,061; Referee: Elvis Osmanovic |

| April 2 3 | Hartford Athletic | 1–2 | Atlanta United 2 | Hartford, Connecticut |
| 7:00 p.m. ET | Brewitt (yellow card) 45'; Cobb 70' (o.g.); Appollon (yellow card) 87' | Report | Lambe (yellow card) 23'; Firmino 45+1', 58'; McFadden (yellow card) 74'; Mertz (yellow card) 78'; Howard (yellow card) 88' | Stadium: Trinity Health Stadium; Attendance: 5,022; Referee: Christian Centeno |

| April 10 4 | Birmingham Legion FC | 2–1 | Hartford Athletic | Birmingham, Alabama |
| 5:00 p.m. ET | Vancaeyezeele (yellow card) 24'; Agudelo 37' (pen.), (yellow card) 53'; Asiedu 90+3'; Van Oekel (yellow card) 90+6' | Report | Lewis (yellow card) 30'; Appollon (yellow card) 36', (goal) 43'; Boudadi (yellow card) 88' | Stadium: Protective Stadium; Referee: Sergii Demianchuk |

| April 16 5 | Miami FC | 2–0 | Hartford Athletic | University Park, Florida |
| 7:00 p.m. EDT | Valot (yellow card) 10'; Murphy 16'; Parkes 87' | Report | Vassell (yellow card) 6' | Stadium: Riccardo Silva Stadium; Attendance: 1,102; Referee: Joshua Encarnación |

| April 23 6 | Hartford Athletic | 1–2 | Detroit City FC | Hartford, Connecticut |
| 7:00 p.m. ET | Dally 42'; Boudadi (yellow card) 78' | Report | Wynne (yellow card) 54', (goal) 68'; Amoo-Mensah (yellow card) 80'; Carroll 90+3' | Stadium: Trinity Health Stadium; Attendance: 4,939; Referee: Luis Arroyo |

| April 30 7 | Indy Eleven | 1–0 | Hartford Athletic | Indianapolis, Indiana |
| 7:00 p.m. ET | Aguilera (yellow card) 21'; Ayoze 40'; Cochran (yellow card) 74'; Fjeldberg (yellow card) 90+1' | Report | Johnson (yellow card) 38'; Boudadi (yellow card) 50' | Stadium: Michael A. Carroll Stadium; Attendance: 4,695; Referee: Greg Dopka |

| May 7 8 | Hartford Athletic | 1–0 | Loudoun United | Hartford, Connecticut |
| 7:00 p.m. ET | Brewitt (yellow card) 24'; Johnson 41'; Hertzog (yellow card) 69'; Prpa (yellow card) 73' | Report | Lillard (yellow card) 68' | Stadium: Trinity Health Stadium; Attendance: 4,631; Referee: Thomas Snyder |

| May 14 9 | Hartford Athletic | 3–2 | New York Red Bulls II | Hartford, Connecticut |
| 7:00 p.m. ET | Boudadi (yellow card) 10'; Prpa 36', (yellow card) 90+3'; Johnson 54'; Apollon (yellow card) 76'; Barrera (yellow card) 81'; Hertzog 90+3', (yellow card) 90+4'; Pack (yellow card) 90+4' | Report | Adebayo-Smith 45+1'; Sserwadda (yellow card) 67'; Tyrkus 70'; Williams (yellow card) 81'; Mullings (yellow card) 85' | Stadium: Trinity Health Stadium; Attendance: 5,500; Referee: José Carlos Rivero |

| May 28 10 | Hartford Athletic | 1–2 | Phoenix Rising FC | Hartford, Connecticut |
| 7:00 p.m. EDT | Saydee 20'; Jadama (yellow card) 38'; Vassell (yellow card) 88' | Report | Farrell (yellow card) 9'; Lambert 35' (yellow card) 71'; Hurst 37'; Lundt (yellow card) 73'; Njie (yellow card) 90+2' | Stadium: Trinity Health Stadium; Attendance: 4,992; Referee: Luis Arroyo |

| June 4 11 | El Paso Locomotive | 1–1 | Hartford Athletic | El Paso, Texas |
| 9:30 p.m. ET | Eigluz (yellow card) 28'; Borelli (yellow card) 40'; Abarca 56' | Report | Barrera (yellow card) 31'; Prpa (yellow card) 34'; Vassell 68'; Boudadi (yellow card) 76' | Stadium: Southwest University Park; Attendance: 6,715; Referee: Joshua Encarnación |

| June 11 12 | San Diego Loyal SC | 3–0 | Hartford Athletic | San Diego, California |
| 10:00 p.m. ET | Moon (yellow card) 8'; Adams 29', (yellow card) 50'; Amang 43'; Dally 83' (o.g.); Adams (yellow card) 89' | Report | McGlynn (yellow card) 11'; Hertzog (yellow card) 26'; Jadama (yellow card) 67' | Stadium: Torero Stadium; Attendance: 4,112; Referee: Malik Badawi |

| June 15 13 | Hartford Athletic | 1–1 | Memphis 901 FC | Hartford, Connecticut |
| 7:00 p.m. ET | Obregón Jr. 21' | Report | Goodrum 64'; Molloy (yellow card) 77' | Stadium: Trinity Health Stadium; Attendance: 5,472; Referee: Austin Saini |

| June 18 14 | Atlanta United 2 | 0–3 | Hartford Athletic | Kennesaw, Georgia |
| 7:30 p.m. ET | Mejia (yellow card) 8'; Lambe (yellow card) 33' | Report | Hertzog (penalty missed) 32'; Lewis (yellow card) 35'; Prpa 42'; Obregón Jr. (yellow card) 52'; Gdula (yellow card) 65'; Johnson 75'; Brewitt 80'; McGlynn (yellow card) 90+3' | Stadium: Fifth Third Bank Stadium; Attendance: 532; Referee: Natalie Simon |

| June 25 15 | Hartford Athletic | 0–2 | Louisville City FC | Hartford, Connecticut |
| 1:00 p.m. ET | Barrera (yellow card) 18'; Jadama (yellow card) 55'; Hertzog (yellow card) 82' | Report | Wynder (yellow card) 14'; Totsch 64'; DelPiccolo 79' | Stadium: Trinity Health Stadium; Referee: Calin Radosav |

| June 28 16 | Hartford Athletic | 2–0 | Colorado Springs Switchbacks FC | Hartford, Connecticut |
| 7:00 p.m. EDT | Boudadi (yellow card) 22'; Johnson (yellow card) 38'; Saydee (yellow card) 45'; McGlynn (yellow card) 60'; Martínez 74'; Lewis 79' | Report | Adewole (yellow card) 23'; Mahoney (yellow card) 49'; Ockford (yellow card) 78' | Stadium: Trinity Health Stadium; Attendance: 5,241; Referee: John Griggs |

| July 6 17 | Detroit City FC | 1–1 | Hartford Athletic | Hamtramck, Michigan |
| 7:30 p.m. EDT | Faz 20' | Report | Yacoubou (yellow card) 16'; Lewis 57'; Martínez (yellow card) 90' | Stadium: Keyworth Stadium; Attendance: 5,517; Referee: Matthew Thompson |

| July 9 18 | Hartford Athletic | 2–3 | Tampa Bay Rowdies | Hartford, Connecticut |
| 7:00 p.m. EDT | Gdula (yellow card) 32'; Barrera 49'; Dally 56'; Oettl (yellow card) 90+7' | Report | Dalgaard 36'; Vancaeyezeele (yellow card) 61'; Wyke (yellow card) 62'; Dos Santos (yellow card) 64'; Fernandes (penalty scored) 73', (penalty scored) 90+8'; Scarlett (red card) 90+2' | Stadium: Trinity Health Stadium; Attendance: 5,090; Referee: Joshua Encarnación |

| July 16 19 | Charleston Battery | 1–3 | Hartford Athletic | Mount Pleasant, South Carolina |
| 7:30 p.m. EDT | Asensio (yellow card) 2'; Williams 13', 53'; Kwakwa 25'; Kilwien (yellow card) 27'; Oduro (yellow card) 38'; Piggott (yellow card) 61'; Sheldon (red card) 81' | Report | Saydee 22'; McGlynn (yellow card) 48' | Stadium: Patriots Point Soccer Complex; Attendance: 1,998; Referee: Sergii Demianchuk |

| July 23 20 | Hartford Athletic | 1–2 | Pittsburgh Riverhounds SC | Hartford, Connecticut |
| 7:00 p.m. EDT | Prpa (yellow card) 24'; McGlynn 55'; Boudadi (yellow card) 69'; Brewitt (yellow card) 73' | Report | M. Williams (yellow card) 66'; Cicerone 74'; Wiedt (yellow card) 90+4', (goal) 90+4' | Stadium: Trinity Health Stadium; Attendance: 4,628; Referee: Jeremy Scheer |

| July 27 21 | Rio Grande Valley FC Toros | 0–0 | Hartford Athletic | Edinburg, Texas |
| 8:30 p.m. EDT | Pimentel (yellow card) 57'; Ricketts (yellow card) 59'; Ward (yellow card) 67' | Report | Brewitt (yellow card) 33'; Lewis (yellow card) 87' | Stadium: H-E-B Park; Referee: Luis Guardia |

| July 30 22 | Hartford Athletic | 0–1 | Birmingham Legion FC | Hartford, Connecticut |
| 7:00 p.m. ET | Brewitt (yellow card) 23'; Boudadi (yellow card) 59'; Gdula (yellow card) 77'; Barrera (yellow card) 86' | Report | Martínez (yellow card) 72', (goal) 90+1'; Bunbury (yellow card) 90+4' | Stadium: Trinity Health Stadium; Attendance: 4,676; Referee: Christian Centeno |

| August 6 23 | Memphis 901 FC | 3–1 | Hartford Athletic | Memphis, Tennessee |
| 8:30 p.m. ET | Allan (yellow card) 11'; Molloy 41'; Carroll 44'; Kelly (yellow card) 58'; Pickering 87' | Report | Saydee 37'; Barrera (yellow card) 51'; Gdula (yellow card) 71'; Martínez (yellow card) 83'; Curry (yellow card) 90' | Stadium: AutoZone Park; Attendance: 3,876; Referee: John Griggs |

| August 13 24 | Hartford Athletic | 2–1 | Indy Eleven | Hartford, Connecticut |
| 7:00 p.m. EDT | Barrera 19', (yellow card) 53'; Martínez 26' | Report | Dambrot (yellow card) 33'; Hackshaw (yellow card) 43'; Ayoze 45+2' (pen.); Rivera (yellow card) 84' | Stadium: Trinity Health Stadium; Attendance: 4,924; Referee: Benjamin Meyer |

| August 20 25 | Hartford Athletic | 0–2 | Miami FC | Hartford, Connecticut |
| 7:00 p.m. EDT | Saydee (yellow card) 47'; Apollon (yellow card) 79' | Report | Sparrow (yellow card) 11'; Murphy 45+3' (pen.); Valot 62'; Akinyode (yellow card) 75' | Stadium: Trinity Health Stadium; Attendance: 5,500; Referee: Calin Radosav |

| August 24 26 | FC Tulsa | 1–2 | Hartford Athletic | Tulsa, Oklahoma |
| 8:30 p.m. ET | Suarez (penalty scored) 81' | Report | Martinez 20'; Obregón Jr. 83' | Stadium: Oneok Field; Attendance: 3,680; Referee: Cristian Campo |

| August 31 27 | New York Red Bulls II | 3–3 | Hartford Athletic | Montclair, New Jersey |
| 7:00 p.m. ET | Castellano 1'; Filipe 3', 71'; Knapp (yellow card) 63'; Conte (yellow card) 85' | Report | Brewitt 50'; Boudadi (yellow card) 55'; Obregón Jr. 90+2'; Dally 90+6' | Stadium: MSU Soccer Park; Referee: Thomas Snyder |

| September 5 28 | LA Galaxy II | 1–3 | Hartford Athletic | Carson, California |
| 10:30 p.m. ET | Neal (red card) 27'; Cabral (yellow card) 36'; Dunbar 54'; Judd (yellow card) 55'; González (yellow card) 63' | Report | Johnson (yellow card) 20'; Martínez (penalty scored) 29'; Brewitt (yellow card) 32'; Prpa (yellow card) 62'; Jadama (yellow card) 77'; Lewis 90'; Curry 90+3' | Stadium: Dignity Health Sports Park Track & Field Stadium; Referee: Greg Dopka |

| September 10 29 | Hartford Athletic | 3–2 | FC Tulsa | Hartford, Connecticut |
| 7:00pm EDT | Yacoubou 9'; Wormell 16' (o.g.); Saydee 24'; Lewis (yellow card) 25'; Brewitt (yellow card) 45+3'; McGlynn (yellow card) 66' | Report | Bourgeois (yellow card) 60'; Diz Pe (yellow card) 78'; Powder (yellow card) 84'; Suarez 90' da Costa 90+5'; Bird (yellow card) 90+5' | Stadium: Dillon Stadium; Attendance: 5,500; Referee: Chris Ruska |

| September 17 30 | Hartford Athletic | 3–0 | Las Vegas Lights FC | Hartford, Connecticut |
| 7:00 p.m. ET | Martínez 12', 28'; Oettl (yellow card) 35'; Jadama (yellow card) 72'; Brewitt 79', (yellow card) 80' | Report | Keinan (yellow card) 6' | Stadium: Trinity Health Stadium; Attendance: 5,500; Referee: Mark Allatin |

| September 21 31 | Loudoun United FC | 3–0 | Hartford Athletic | Leesburg, Virginia |
| 7:00 p.m. ET | Simonsen (yellow card) 31'; Ku-DiPietro 50'; Akinmboni (yellow card) 51'; Freeman 71', 74'; Smith (yellow card) 90+6' | Report | Saydee (yellow card) 43'; Yacoubou (yellow card) 45+2'; Brewitt (yellow card) 63' | Stadium: Segra Field; Attendance: 2,073; Referee: Danielle Chesky |

| October 1 32 | Hartford Athletic | 6–3 | Charleston Battery | Hartford, Connecticut |
| 7:00 p.m. ET | Martínez 10', 90'; Lewis 13', 57', (penalty scored) 87'; Yacoubou (yellow card) 17'; Obregón Jr. 45+1'; Slayton (yellow card) 81' | Report | Booth 51'; Apodaca 53'; Kilwien (yellow card) 63'; Williams 79'; Archer (yellow card) 86' | Stadium: Trinity Health Stadium; Attendance: 5,500; Referee: Alexandra Billeter |

| October 8 33 | Hartford Athletic | 1–3 | Oakland Roots SC | Hartford, Connecticut |
| 7:00 p.m. ET | Appollon (yellow card) 17'; Yacoubou 48'; Martínez (yellow card) 61'; Johnson (yellow card) 73' | Report | Azócar 4', (yellow card) 45'; Karlsson 59'; Rodriguez 90+3' | Stadium: Trinity Health Stadium; Attendance: 5,500; Referee: Elvis Osmanovic |

| October 15 34 | Louisville City FC | 2–1 | Hartford Athletic | Louisville, Kentucky |
| 7:30 p.m. ET | Dia (yellow card) 37'; DelPiccolo 45'; Charpie (yellow card) 72'; Totsch (yellow card) 90+1'; Lancaster 90+4' (pen.) | Report | Yacoubou (yellow card) 34'; Prpa (yellow card) 43'; Martínez 74'; McGlynn (yellow card) 80' | Stadium: Lynn Family Stadium; Attendance: 12,096; Referee: Calin Radosav |

=== U.S. Open Cup ===
| April 7 Second Round | Hartford Athletic (Connecticut) | 3–1 | (New York (state)) Oyster Bay United FC | Hartford, Connecticut |
| 7:00 PM EDT | Johnson 49'; Prpa 70'; Saydee 90+2' | Report | Junior Rosero 59' (pen.) | Stadium: Trinity Health Stadium; Attendance: 1,634; Referee: Kenneth Rojas |

| April 20 Third Round | Hartford Athletic (Connecticut) | 1–2 | (New Jersey) New York Red Bulls | Hartford, Connecticut |
| 7:00 PM EDT | McGlynn 52' | Report | Morgan 18' Long 25' | Stadium: Trinity Health Stadium; Attendance: 5,144; Referee: Ernie Constantine |

== See also ==
- Hartford Athletic
- 2022 in American soccer
- 2022 USL Championship season
