= Ousmane Sylla (Senegalese footballer) =

Senegalese footballer (born 2001)

Personal information
- Date of birth: August 7, 2001 (age 25)
- Place of birth: Dakar, Senegal
- Height: 5 ft 8 in (1.73 m)
- Position: Midfielder

Team information
- Current team: Orange County SC
- Number: 8

College career
Years	Team	Apps	(Gls)
2020–2023	Clemson Tigers	71	(24)

Senior career*
Years	Team	Apps	(Gls)
2024	Houston Dynamo	0	(0)
2024	→ Houston Dynamo 2 (loan)	23	(7)
2025–	Orange County SC	50	(9)
- * Club domestic league appearances and goals as of 13:54, 10 November 2026 (UTC)

Ousmane Sylla (born 7 August 2001) is a Senegalese professional footballer who plays as a midfielder for USL Championship club Orange County SC.

== Early life ==
Sylla was born in Dakar, Senegal. He eventually moved to the United States, where he attended Montverde Academy and played for their SIMA soccer program.

== College career ==
In 2020, he committed to attend Clemson University to play for the men's soccer team, however, due to the COVID-19 pandemic, he began attending in January 2021. He made his collegiate debut on 7 March 2021, starting against the Syracuse Orange. On 13 March 2021, he scored his first collegiate goal, netting the overtime winner in a 1–0 victory over the Virginia Tech Hokies, which earned him NCAA Division I men's Player of the Week honors. At the end of his first season, he was named to the Atlantic Coast Conference All-Freshman Team. After his sophomore season, he was named to the All-ACC Second Team and the All-South Region Second Team. On 26 August 2022, he scored a brace in a 3–2 victory in the season opener against the Indiana Hoosiers, which earned him ACC co-Offensive Player of the Week honors. Sylla received first-team All-ACC and second-team All-South Region honors for the season, and was invited to participate in the MLS College Showcase.

Ahead of his senior season, Sylla was named to the ACC Preseason Watch List. On 29 September 2023, he scored a winning goal with four seconds remaining in the match to lead Clemson to a 3–2 victory over the Virginia Tech Hokies, subsequently being named to the National Team of the Week, an honour he received another four times that season. The following week, he was named the ACC Offensive Player of the Week. He helped the team win the national title, being named the tournament's Most Outstanding Offensive Player and being selected to the All-Tournament Team. At the end of the season, he was named a first-team All-American and won the 2023 Hermann Trophy as the top collegiate player.

== Club career ==
=== Houston Dynamo ===
At the 2024 MLS SuperDraft, Sylla was selected in the second round (55th overall) by Houston Dynamo FC. In February 2024, he signed a professional contract with the club for the 2024 season, with options through 2027. He made his professional debut on 13 March, for the Dynamo in a 2024 CONCACAF Champions Cup match against the Columbus Crew. On 7 November, his contract option was declined by Houston following their 2024 season.

=== Orange County SC ===
On 21 January 2025, USL Championship club Orange County SC announced the signing of Sylla. On 8 March, Sylla made his debut for the club in the opening match of the season when he came on as a 69th-minute substitute for Pedro Guimaraes as they defeated the Oakland Roots 4–2, the team's first opening season win since 2017. On 15 April, Sylla scored his first goal for the team as he provided a goal and an assist in a 2–2 U.S. Open Cup draw against AV Alta FC before losing 4–2 on penalties. On 15 October, Sylla scored his first league goal in a 1–0 win against San Antonio FC. On 8 November, Sylla provided a game-equalizing assist to Malik Pinto against New Mexico United in the semi-finals of the USL Championship, but Orange County were eliminated 2–1.

== Career statistics ==
As of 24 October 2026

Club	Season	League			Playoffs (Note: Includes MLS Next Pro playoffs and USL Championship playoffs)		National cup		Continental		Other		Total	
Club	Season	Division	Apps	Goals	Apps	Goals	Apps	Goals	Apps	Goals	Apps	Goals	Apps	Goals
Houston Dynamo	2024	Major League Soccer	0	0	0	0	0	0	1	0	—		1	0
Houston Dynamo 2 (loan)	2024	MLS Next Pro	23	7	1	0	—		—		—		24	7
Orange County SC	2025	USL Championship	22	2	2	0	1	1	—		3 (Note: Appearances in USL Cup)	0	28	3
Orange County SC	2026	USL Championship	28	6	—		1	1	—		3 (Note: Appearances in USL Cup)	0	32	7
Orange County SC	Total		50	8	2	0	2	2	—		6	0	60	10
Career total			71	14	3	0	2	2	1	0	6	0	85	17

== Honours ==
Clemson Tigers

- ACC men's soccer tournament: 2023

Individual

- Hermann Trophy: 2023
