= Mitchell Curry =

English footballer (born 1999)

Personal information
- Date of birth: 14 July 1999 (age 27)
- Place of birth: Houghton le Spring, England
- Height: 5 ft 10 in (1.78 m)
- Positions: Striker; winger

Youth career
- 2014–2017: Middlesbrough

Senior career*
Years	Team	Apps	(Gls)
2017–2020	Middlesbrough	0	(0)
2017–2018	→ Harrogate Town (loan)	5	(1)
2019–2020	→ Inverness Caledonian Thistle (loan)	9	(1)
2020	→ Gateshead (loan)	7	(1)
2020–2021	Sunderland	1	(0)
2021	Fort Lauderdale CF	23	(8)
2022	Hartford Athletic	12	(1)
2023–2024	Darlington	25	(5)
2024–2025	Blyth Spartans	15	(1)
2025	Whitby Town	10	(2)
- * Club domestic league appearances and goals

Mitchell Curry (born 14 July 1999) is an English former professional footballer who played as a striker.

== Career ==
Born in Houghton-le-Spring, Curry joined Middlesbrough at under-15 level, signing professional terms in 2016.

On 23 September 2017, Curry joined Harrogate Town on loan for an initial month. The loan was extended for a second month, and he made seven appearances in league and FA Cup and scored once, a late winner away to Curzon Ashton that took Harrogate top of the National League North.

He moved on loan to Scottish Championship side Inverness Caledonian Thistle on 26 June 2019, with the loan having a recall option for January 2020. Curry returned to Middlesbrough on 7 January 2020, having made 15 appearances in which he scored 2 goals.

Three days later, Curry joined Gateshead on loan for the remainder of the season.

He left Middlesbrough at the end of the 2019–20 season.

In September 2020 he signed for Sunderland. He made his Sunderland debut on 15 December 2020 in a 1–1 draw with AFC Wimbledon.

In April 2021, Curry joined USL League One side Fort Lauderdale CF ahead of the 2021 season.

On 27 January 2022, it was announced that Curry had signed with USL Championship side Hartford Athletic. After leaving the club, he returned to England and trained with Sunderland.

In June 2023 he signed a one-year contract with Darlington.

In August 2024, Curry joined Northern Premier League Premier Division side Blyth Spartans on a short-term contract until 31 January 2025. He left the club when his contract expired, having made 19 appearances in all competitions, and signed for Spartans' divisional rivals Whitby Town in February 2025.

On 1 June 2025, Curry announced his retirement from football.

== Career statistics ==
As of match played 15 March 2025

Appearances and goals by club, season and competition
Club	Season	League			National Cup (Note: Includes FA Cup, Scottish Cup, U.S. Open Cup)		League Cup (Note: Includes EFL Cup, Scottish League Cup)		Other		Total	
Club	Season	Division	Apps	Goals	Apps	Goals	Apps	Goals	Apps	Goals	Apps	Goals
Middlesbrough U21	2017–18	—			—		—		1 (Note: Appearance in EFL Trophy)	0	1	0
Middlesbrough	2017–18	Championship	0	0	0	0	0	0	0	0	0	0
Middlesbrough	2018–19	Championship	0	0	0	0	0	0	0	0	0	0
Middlesbrough	2019–20	Championship	0	0	0	0	0	0	0	0	0	0
Middlesbrough	Total		0	0	0	0	0	0	0	0	0	0
Harrogate Town (loan)	2017–18	National League North	5	1	2	0	0	0	0	0	7	1
Inverness Caledonian Thistle (loan)	2019–20	Scottish Championship	9	1	0	0	4	0	2 (Note: Appearances and goal in Scottish League Challenge Cup)	1	15	2
Gateshead (loan)	2019–20	National League North	7	1	0	0	0	0	0	0	7	1
Sunderland	2020–21	League One	1	0	0	0	0	0	0	0	1	0
Fort Lauderdale CF	2021	USL League One	23	8	0	0	0	0	0	0	23	8
Hartford Athletic	2022	USL Championship	12	1	2	0	0	0	0	0	14	1
Darlington	2023–24	National League North	25	5	1	0	0	0	0	0	26	5
Blyth Spartans	2024–25	Northern Premier League (NPL); Premier Division	15	1	3	1	0	0	1 (Note: Appearance in FA Trophy)	0	19	2
Whitby Town	2024–25	NPL Premier Division	4	1	0	0	0	0	0	0	4	1
Career totals			101	19	6	1	4	0	4	1	117	21

== Personal life ==
Curry grew up as a Newcastle United supporter.
