= Mataeo Bunbury =

Canadian soccer player (born 2005)

Personal information
- Full name: Mataeo Chandler Razario Bunbury
- Date of birth: June 13, 2005 (age 21)
- Place of birth: Northfield, Minnesota, United States
- Height: 1.80 m (5 ft 11 in)
- Position: Forward

Team information
- Current team: Orange County SC
- Number: 20

Youth career
- 2008–2016: Lakeville SC
- 2016–2019: Sporting CP
- 2019: Minneapolis United SC
- 2019–2020: Minnesota United FC
- 2020–2021: Sporting Kansas City

Senior career*
Years	Team	Apps	(Gls)
2021–2022	Sporting Kansas City II	17	(4)
2022–2023	Birmingham Legion	13	(1)
2023	→ Columbus Crew 2 (loan)	18	(4)
2024–2025	Portland Timbers 2	47	(9)
2026–	Orange County SC	12	(1)

International career^{‡}
2022–2024	Canada U20	4	(1)
- * Club domestic league appearances and goals as of October 31, 2026 ‡ National team caps and goals as of July 26, 2024

Mataeo Chandler Razario Bunbury (born June 13, 2005) is a professional soccer player. Born in the United States, he represented Canada at youth level. He plays as a forward.

== Early life ==
Bunbury began playing soccer at age three with Lakeville SC. In 2016, he joined the Sporting CP Youth Academy in Portugal. Later, he played for Minneapolis United SC, before joining the Minnesota United academy, leaving the club in 2020 when the academy ceased operating. Afterwards, he joined the Sporting Kansas City academy, playing for the club's Under-17 and Under-19 age groups. He became the third member of his family to join the organization, after his father Alex and older brother Teal previously played for the MLS side.

== Club career ==
=== Sporting Kansas City II ===
On September 22, 2021, Bunbury signed a USL academy contract with USL Championship side Sporting Kansas City II, allowing him to retain his NCAA eligibility. He made his professional debut on September 24, 2021, appearing as an 85th-minute substitute during a 1–1 draw with FC Tulsa. After SKC II's move to MLS Next Pro for 2022, he signed another non-professional academy contract, Bunbury scored his first professional goal on April 3, 2022, against Minnesota United 2. In July 2022, Bunbury had departed Sporting Kansas City, after requesting a first-team contract, but being deemed unready by senior team coach Peter Vermes.

=== Birmingham Legion ===
Bunbury signed with USL Championship club Birmingham Legion FC on July 8, 2022. He made his debut the next day in a substitute appearance against the Charleston Battery. He scored his first goal on July 27, scoring a penalty kick against Loudoun United. Bunbury would make a return to MLS Next Pro on April 7, 2023, joining Columbus Crew 2 on loan.

=== Portland Timbers 2 ===
Bunbry joined MLS Next Pro side Portland Timbers 2 on March 14, 2024. In November 2024, Bunbury signed a new one-year contract with Portland. He would be released at the end of the 2025 season.

=== Orange County ===
In January 2026, Orange County SC announced they had signed Bunbury to a contract for the 2026 season.

== International career ==
Bunbury is eligible for both the United States and Canada.

In March 2019, he attended a camp with the United States U14 team.

In April 2022, Bunbury accepted a call-up to the Canadian Under-20 side for two friendly matches against Costa Rica. In July 2024, he was named to the 21-man squad for the 2024 CONCACAF U-20 Championship.

== Career statistics ==
As of match played March 28, 2026

Appearances and goals by club, season and competition
Club	Season	League			Playoffs		National cup		Continental		Total	
Club	Season	Division	Apps	Goals	Apps	Goals	Apps	Goals	Apps	Goals	Apps	Goals
Sporting Kansas City II	2021	USL Championship	7	0	0	0	0	0	0	0	7	0
Sporting Kansas City II	2022	MLS Next Pro	10	4	0	0	0	0	0	0	10	4
Sporting Kansas City II	Total		17	4	0	0	0	0	0	0	17	4
Birmingham Legion	2022	USL Championship	13	1	0	0	0	0	0	0	13	1
Columbus Crew 2 (loan)	2023	MLS Next Pro	18	4	4	0	0	0	0	0	22	4
Portland Timbers 2	2024	MLS Next Pro	20	3	0	0	1	0	0	0	21	3
Portland Timbers 2	2025	MLS Next Pro	27	6	0	0	0	0	0	0	27	6
Portland Timbers 2	Total		47	9	0	0	1	0	0	0	48	9
Orange County SC	2026	USL Championship	3	1	0	0	1	0	0	0	4	1
Career total			98	19	4	0	2	0	0	0	104	19

== Personal ==
Mataeo is the son of former professional soccer player Alex Bunbury and the younger brother of fellow professional soccer player Teal Bunbury and actress Kylie Bunbury.
