= Tom Brewitt =

English footballer (born 1997)

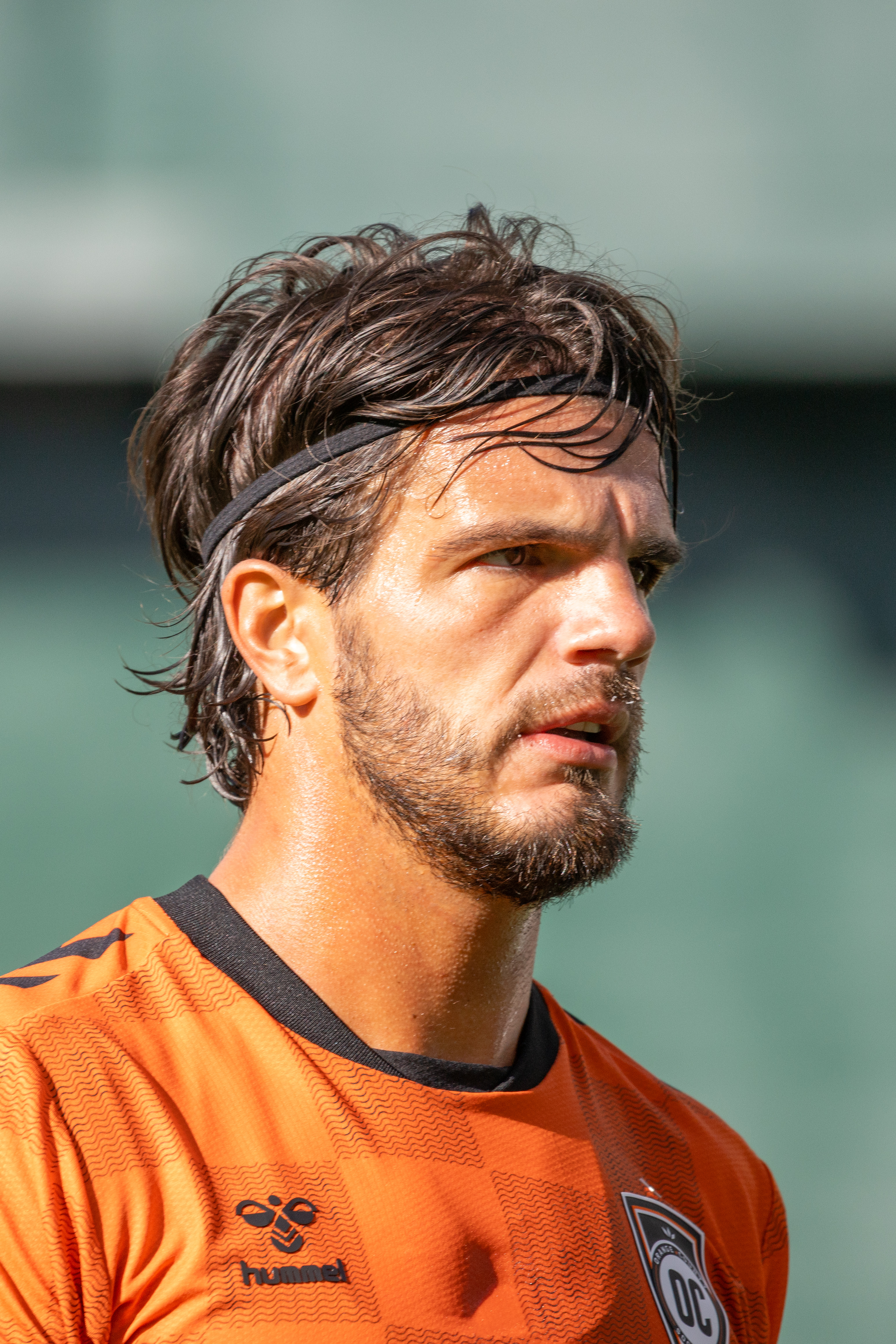

Personal information
- Full name: Tom Patrizio Brewitt
- Date of birth: 11 February 1997 (age 29)
- Place of birth: Liverpool, England
- Height: 1.85 m (6 ft 1 in)
- Position: Defender

Team information
- Current team: Orange County SC
- Number: 5

Youth career
- 2007–2017: Liverpool
- 2017–2018: Middlesbrough

Senior career*
Years	Team	Apps	(Gls)
2018–2019	AFC Fylde	16	(0)
2019–2020	Morecambe	22	(1)
2021	Tacoma Defiance	29	(2)
2022	Hartford Athletic	31	(3)
2023–2024	Swindon Town	44	(1)
2025–	Orange County SC	29	(1)

International career
2012–2013	England U16	5	(1)
2013–2014	England U17	6	(1)
- * Club domestic league appearances and goals as of 13:53, 10 November 2026 (UTC)

Tom Patrizio Brewitt (born 11 February 1997) is an English professional footballer who plays as a defender for Orange County SC.

== Club career ==
Born in Liverpool, Brewitt played youth football for Liverpool (where he spent 10 years, including serving as captain in the FA Youth Cup) and Middlesbrough.

He signed for AFC Fylde in September 2018, after trialing for Walsall, Kilmarnock, and Málaga, before moving to Morecambe in June 2019. He was released by the club at the end of the 2019–20 season.

In March 2021 he signed for American team Tacoma Defiance.

Brewitt signed with USL Championship side Hartford Athletic on 2 February 2022.

Brewitt signed for Swindon Town on 7 March 2023 on a deal until the end of the season. He was released by the club at the end of the 2023–24 season.

In February 2025, Brewitt returned to America to join Orange County SC.

=== Daniel Cleary incident ===
In October 2020 Brewitt admitted that when he was a Liverpool youth player he had deliberately injured his teammate Daniel Cleary in training to try and improve his own chances of being picked for the first team.

In 2024, Cleary revealed he was suing both Brewitt and Liverpool for contributing to the "loss of a top-level career", due to resulting further injury and depression.

== International career ==
Brewitt represented England at under-16 and under-17 youth international levels.

== Personal life ==
Brewitt has American citizenship through his mother.

== Career statistics ==
As of match played 16 April 2024

Appearances and goals by club, season and competition
Club	Season	League			National Cup		League Cup		Other		Total	
Club	Season	Division	Apps	Goals	Apps	Goals	Apps	Goals	Apps	Goals	Apps	Goals
AFC Fylde	2018–19	National League	16	0	0	0	—		3 (Note: Appearances in the FA Trophy.)	0	19	0
Morecambe	2019–20	League Two	22	1	1	0	2	0	2 (Note: Appearances in the EFL Trophy.)	1	27	2
Tacoma Defiance	2021	USL Championship	29	2	0	0	—		—		29	2
Hartford Athletic	2022	USL Championship	31	3	2	0	—		—		33	3
Swindon Town	2022–23	League Two	12	0	0	0	0	0	0	0	12	0
Swindon Town	2023–24	League Two	32	1	1	0	1	0	0	0	34	1
Swindon Town	Total		44	1	1	0	1	0	0	0	46	1
Career total			142	7	4	0	3	0	5	1	154	8

== Honours ==
AFC Fylde

- FA Trophy: 2018–19
