= Pedro Guimaraes (soccer) =

American soccer player (born 2008)

Personal information
- Full name: Pedro Viana Guimaraes
- Date of birth: April 10, 2008 (age 18)
- Place of birth: Paoli, Pennsylvania, United States
- Height: 1.78 m (5 ft 10 in)
- Position: Defender

Team information
- Current team: Eintracht Frankfurt II
- Number: 3

Youth career
- –2024: Los Angeles FC

Senior career*
Years	Team	Apps	(Gls)
2024–2026	Orange County SC	30	(2)
2026–	Eintracht Frankfurt II	0	(0)

International career^{‡}
2023	United States U15	6	(0)
2024	United States U16	2	(0)
2024–2025	United States U17	14	(1)
- * Club domestic league appearances and goals as of August 29, 2026 ‡ National team caps and goals as of November 14, 2025

Pedro Viana Guimaraes (Brazilian Portuguese pronunciation: [ˈpe.dɾu ɡi.mɐˈɾɐ̃j̃ʃ]; born April 10, 2008) is a professional soccer player who plays as a defender for Regionalliga Südwest side Eintracht Frankfurt II.

== Early life ==
Guimaraes was born in Paoli, Pennsylvania, United States. He is of Brazilian descent and has a brother named Johnny. His family moved to California when he was a child.

== Club career ==
As a youth player, Guimaraes joined the youth academy of American side Los Angeles FC. In 2024, he was selected for the MLS Next All-Star Game. Following his stint at LAFC, he signed for Orange County SC in late 2024.

In February 2026, Orange County SC announced they had agreed to transfer Guimaraes to Eintracht Frankfurt pending the summer opening of Germany's international transfer window on July 1, 2026.

== International career ==
Guimaraes is a United States youth international. During the autumn of 2025, he played for the United States men's national under-17 soccer team at the 2025 FIFA U-17 World Cup.

== Style of play ==
Guimares is considered one of the top prospects in US soccer. He is known for his inverted full-back style of play, ability to play on either flanks, and composure on the ball.
