= Stephen Kelly (Scottish footballer) =

Scottish footballer (born 2000)

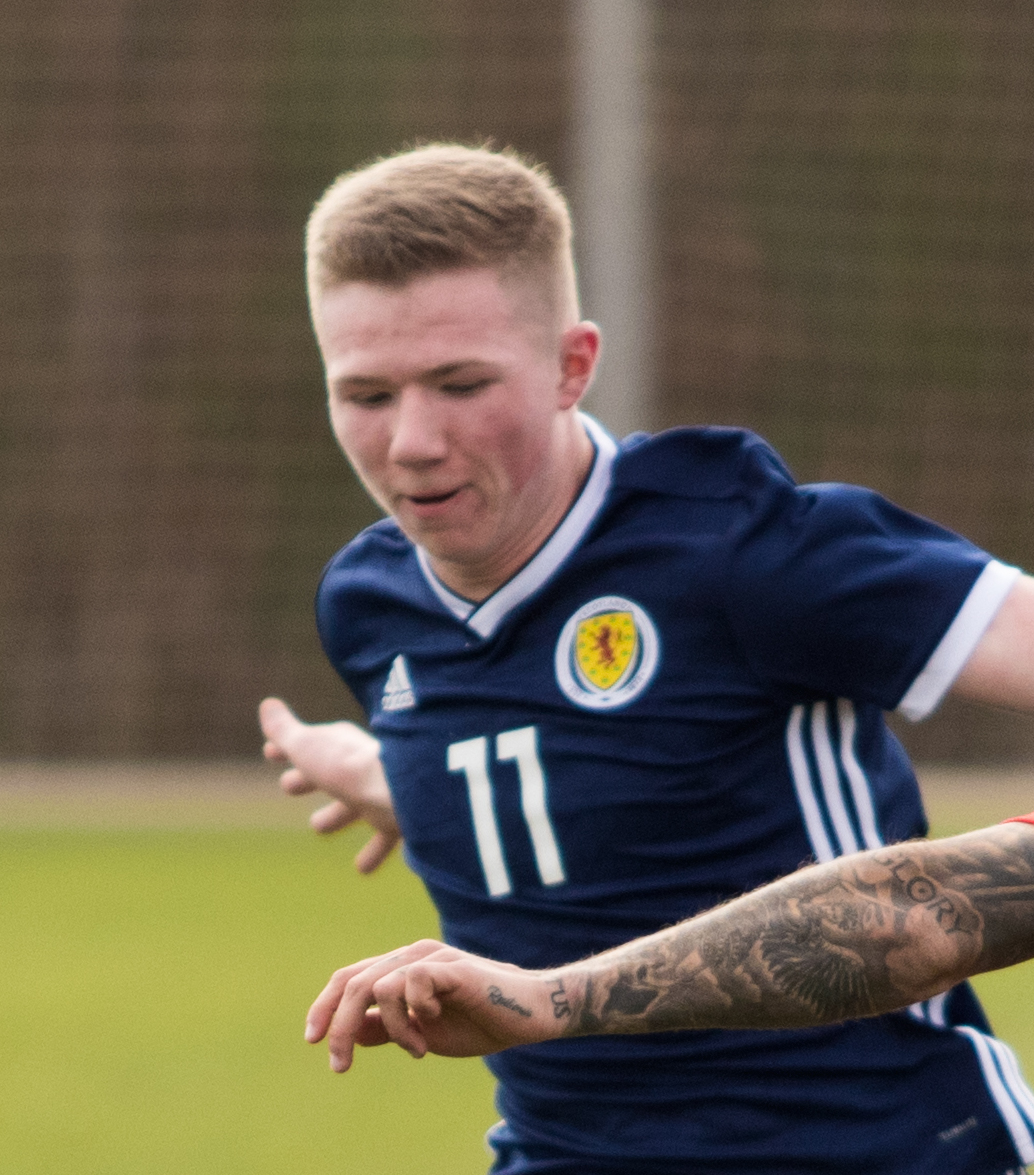
- Kelly with Scotland U19, 2019

Personal information
- Full name: Stephen William John Kelly
- Date of birth: 13 April 2000 (age 26)
- Place of birth: Port Glasgow, Scotland
- Height: 5 ft 10 in (1.78 m)
- Position: Midfielder

Team information
- Current team: Orange County SC
- Number: 27

Youth career
- –2018: Rangers

Senior career*
Years	Team	Apps	(Gls)
2018–2022	Rangers	0	(0)
2019–2020	→ Ayr United (loan)	28	(5)
2020–2021	→ Ross County (loan)	25	(0)
2022	→ Salford City (loan)	21	(1)
2022–2025	Livingston	91	(13)
2025–	Orange County SC	45	(5)

International career
2015	Scotland U16	2	(2)
2017	Scotland U17	2	(1)
2018–2019	Scotland U19	6	(4)
2019–2022	Scotland U21	11	(1)
- * Club domestic league appearances and goals as of 13:57, 10 November 2026 (UTC)

Stephen William John Kelly (born 13 April 2000) is a Scottish footballer who plays as a midfielder for USL Championship club Orange County SC.

== Club career ==
Kelly signed a three-year contract with Rangers on 13 September 2018, and less than two weeks later made his professional debut when he came on as a substitute in a Scottish League Cup win over Ayr United on 26 September. He was loaned to Ayr United in July 2019, then spent the 2020-–21 season on loan at Scottish Premiership side Ross County.

On 12 January 2022, Kelly joined EFL League Two side Salford City on loan for the remainder of the 2021–22 season. He made his club debut as a second-half on 15 January in a league match against Bradford City. His full debut came three days later in a match against Port Vale.

Kelly moved on a permanent basis to Livingston in September 2022 for an undisclosed fee.

On 25 June 2025, it was announced that Kelly would join second-tier American side Orange County SC, who play in the USL Championship.

== International career ==
Kelly has represented Scotland at under-17, under-19 and under-21 international levels.

== Career statistics ==
As of match played 31 August 2022

Appearances and goals by club, season and competition
Club	Season	League			National Cup		League Cup		Other		Total	
Club	Season	Division	Apps	Goals	Apps	Goals	Apps	Goals	Apps	Goals	Apps	Goals
Rangers	2018–19	Scottish Premiership	0	0	0	0	1	0	0	0	1	0
Rangers	2021–22	Scottish Premiership	0	0	0	0	1	0	1 (Note: Appearance in the UEFA Europa League)	0	2	0
Rangers	Total		0	0	0	0	2	0	1	0	3	0
Rangers Under-20s	2016–17	—	—		—		—		1 (Note: Appearances in the Scottish Challenge Cup)	0	1	0
Rangers Under-21s	2018–19	—	—		—		—		1	0	1	0
Rangers B	2022–23	—	—		—		—		2	1	2	1
Ayr United (loan)	2019–20	Scottish Championship	27	5	2	0	4	1	0	0	33	6
Ross County (loan)	2020–21	Scottish Premiership	25	0	1	0	3	0	—		29	0
Salford City (loan)	2021–22	EFL League Two	21	1	—		—		—		21	1
Career total			73	6	3	0	9	1	5	1	90	8

== Honours ==
Livingston

- Scottish Challenge Cup: 2024–25
- Scottish Premiership play-offs: 2025
