= Danny Stone (footballer) =

English footballer

Personal information
- Full name: Daniel John Cooper Stone
- Date of birth: 14 September 1982 (age 44)
- Place of birth: Liverpool, England
- Height: 1.80 m (5 ft 11 in)
- Position: Defender

Team information
- Current team: Orange County SC

Youth career
- –2001: Blackburn Rovers

Senior career*
Years	Team	Apps	(Gls)
2001–2003	Notts County	21	(0)
2003–2004	Southport	19	(0)

Managerial career
- 2015–2018: Colorado Rapids (assistant)
- 2018–2020: OKC Energy (assistant)
- 2021–2023: Phoenix Rising (assistant)
- 2024: Phoenix Rising
- 2024: Orange County SC (interim)
- 2025–2026: Orange County SC
- * Club domestic league appearances and goals as of 5 February 2024

Daniel John Cooper Stone (born 14 September 1982) is an English professional football manager and former footballer, who is the manager of Orange County SC. He has previously managed Phoenix Rising FC of the USL Championship. As a player he made his professional debut for Notts County before moving to America to work as a coach.

== Playing career ==
Born in Liverpool, Stone spent time in America growing up, attending Corona del Sol High School. He returned to England to start his football career with Blackburn Rovers before joining Notts County in 2001, where he went on to make 27 appearances in all competitions over two seasons. In the summer of 2003, he was released by the club. Later that summer he joined Southport and made 20 appearances in his first season at the club but left after making just one appearance the following season.

== Coaching career ==
In 2010, Stone started working for the Downtown Las Vegas Soccer Club before moving to work with Colorado Rapids in 2014. In 2017, he worked as the Rapid's assistant coach before being appointed as assistant coach OKC Energy in 2018. In 2021, he moved to join USL Championship club Phoenix Rising, working as assistant coach before being named as the club's first team manager in January 2024. Phoenix Rising parted ways with Stone in June 2024.

Stone joined the staff of Orange County SC in August 2024. After head coach Paul Hardyman was sacked, Stone was named interim head coach for the rest of the season. Stone was named permanent head coach of Orange County on 12 December 2024. On 24 September 2026, it was announced that Orange County SC had parted ways with Stone.
