= Nico Benalcazar =

American soccer player (born 2001)

Personal information
- Full name: Nicholas Benalcazar
- Date of birth: June 6, 2001 (age 25)
- Place of birth: Wilton, Connecticut, United States
- Height: 5 ft 11 in (1.80 m)
- Position: Defender

Team information
- Current team: Orange County SC
- Number: 4

Youth career
- –2014: Beachside SC
- 2015–2019: New York City FC

College career
Years	Team	Apps	(Gls)
2019–2021	Wake Forest Demon Deacons	44	(4)

Senior career*
Years	Team	Apps	(Gls)
2019	Manhattan SC	5	(1)
2022–2023	New York City FC	1	(0)
2022–2023	→ New York City FC II (loan)	33	(3)
2024	FC Cincinnati 2	11	(2)
2025–	Orange County SC	55	(7)

International career
2016–2017	United States U16	3	(0)
2018	United States U18	1	(0)
2020	United States U20	2	(0)
- * Club domestic league appearances and goals as of 13:52, 10 November 2026 (UTC)

Nico Benalcazar (born June 6, 2001) is an American soccer player who plays as a defender for Orange County SC.

== Playing career ==
=== Youth ===
After playing with New England youth side Beachside SC, Benalcazar joined the academy of MLS club New York City FC in their first year of operation, in 2015. He progressed through their age categories from Under-14 upwards, eventually captaining the U-19 team. Benalcazar was voted onto the United States Soccer Development Academy in its U-15/16 Eastern Conference Best XI for the 2016–2017 season.

While acting as captain in the 2017–2018 season, he was awarded NYCFC U-19s’ Academy Player of the Year recognition. This award was given following the NYCFC Development Academy National Championship over LA Galaxy's U-19 squad in July 2018. He played for their MLS professional side in a preseason friendly against FC Copenhagen before their 2019 season while in Abu Dhabi, UAE.

=== College ===
Benalcazar committed to playing college soccer at Wake Forest University, in Winston-Salem, NC. He was rated as a 4 star recruit, and the No. 38 recruit in the nation by TopDrawerSoccer, including the No. 8 defender and No. 3 recruit from New York region.

On August 30, 2019, Benalcazar made his collegiate debut for Wake Forest University, playing 90 minutes in a 2–1 victory against UCF.

Benalcazar received the following awards during his second season at Wake Forest University, 2020 All-ACC Second-Team Selection, 2020 All-ACC Academic Team Selection and was named to the 2020–21 TopDrawerSoccer Best XI Second-Team Selection.

Benalcazar left Wake Forest University in 2022 to sign with New York City FC. He played 54 matches with 49 starts. Benalcazar was named as captain for his last two years at the university. During the 2021 season he earned 2021 All-ACC Academic Team Selection, Third-Team All-ACC and Third-Team All-South Region honors.

=== Professional ===
Nico rejoined NYCFC on a fully professional contract as a Homegrown Player on January 19, 2022, appearing in their preseason game against lower division Mexican side Inter Playa del Carmen . He then was appointed as the first ever captain of the club's new development side, New York City FC II, competing in the brand new MLS Next Pro competition making his professional debut on March 27, 2022. Nico was on the bench for the first team, for the first time ever during NYCFC's opening match of the 2023 season. He made his professional first team debut on July 1, 2023, vs CF Montreal in a 1–0 win away ending a 12-game winless streak. Benalcazar had his option declined at the conclusion of the 2023 MLS season prior to the 2024 season.

Benalcazar signed an MLS Next Pro contract with FC Cincinnati 2 on January 17, 2024.

== International career ==
Benalcazar was born in the United States and is of Ecuadorian descent. He has been selected as a youth international for the United States at various levels up to Under-20 Men's National Team but has stated his desire to play for the Ecuadorian federation as well.

== Career statistics ==
As of match played Dec 27, 2023

Appearances and goals by club, season and competition
Club	Season	League			National cup		Other		Total	
Club	Season	Division	Apps	Goals	Apps	Goals	Apps	Goals	Apps	Goals
Manhattan SC	2021	USL League Two	5	1	—		—		5	1
New York City FC II	2022	MLS Next Pro	21	0	—		—		21	0
New York City FC II	2023	MLS Next Pro	12	3					12	3
New York City FC	2023	Major League Soccer	1	0					1	0
Career total			39	4	0	0	0	0	39	4
