= Championship Soccer Stadium =

Soccer stadium in Irvine, California

- The Champ
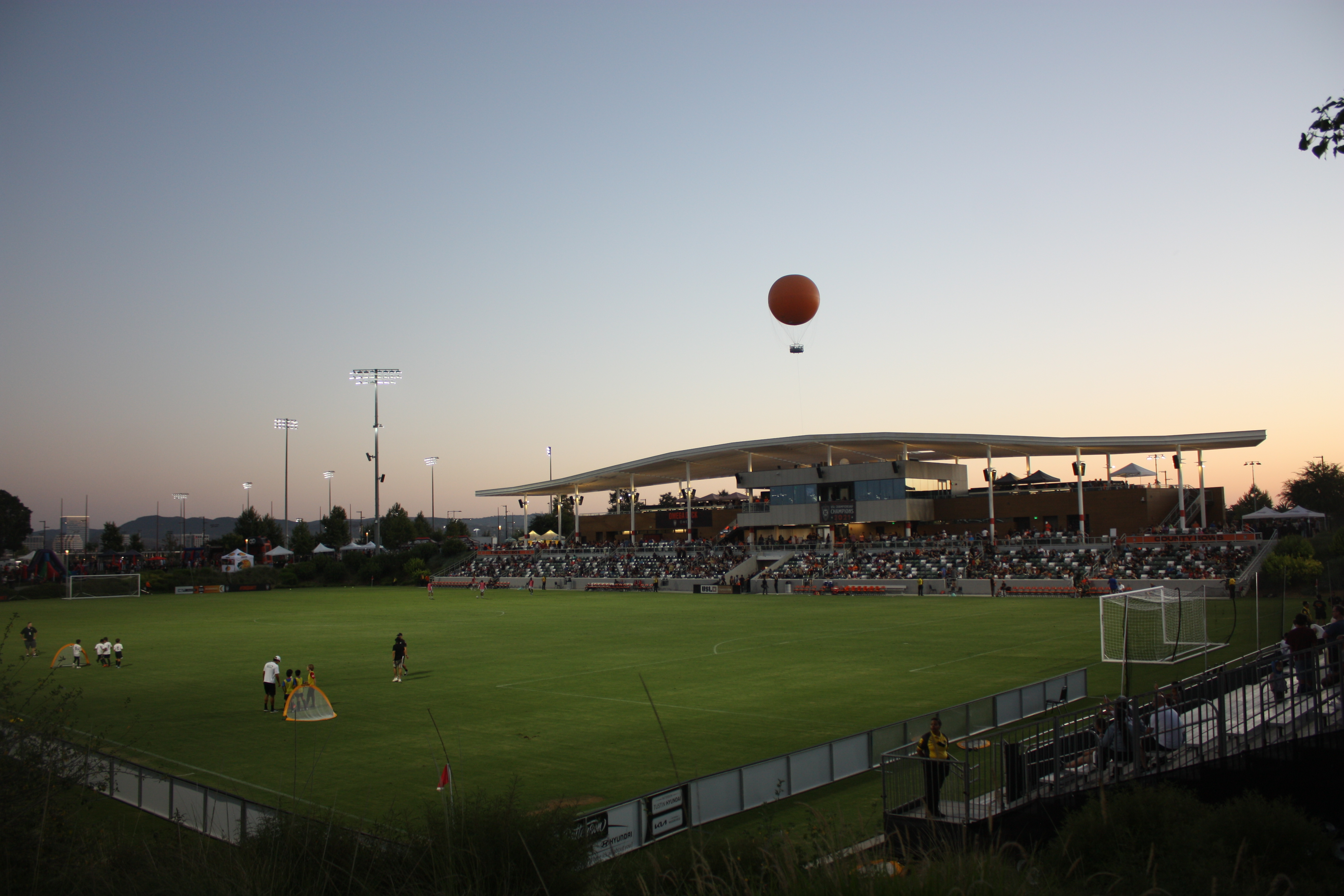
- View of the stadium in 2024

- Location within southern California
- Location: 8272 Great Park Blvd; Irvine, California, United States
- Coordinates: 33°40′28″N 117°44′22″W
- Owner: City of Irvine
- Operator: Orange County Great Park
- Seating type: Chairs; Bleachers
- Capacity: 6,500
- Executive suites: One
- Type: Soccer-specific
- Surface: 419 Bermuda Grass
- Scoreboard: LED Scoreboard with Video Display
- Record attendance: 6,500
- Field size: 120 yards x 72 yards
- Field shape: Rectangle
- Public transit: Irvine

Construction
- Opened: May 6, 2017
- Expanded: Winter 2026
- Architect: FivePoint Communities
- Builder: FivePoint Development
- Main contractors: Heritage Fields El Toro, LLC

Tenants
- Orange County SC (USLC) (2017–present); California Legion (MLR) (2026–present); Los Angeles Black Storm (X League) (2022); Irvine Zeta FC (NISA) (2024); Los Angeles Force (NISA) (2023); Orange County FC (NPSL) (2018–2019); California United Strikers FC (NISA) (2019–2022)

Website
- cityofirvine.org/sports-complex-facilities

Championship Soccer Stadium is a 6,500 seat soccer-specific stadium at the Orange County Great Park in Irvine, California. The stadium serves as the permanent home of Orange County SC of the second tier USL Championship soccer league, and one of multiple homes for Major League Rugby's California Legion. Championship Soccer Stadium is publicly owned and operated by the City of Irvine.

Opened in 2017 and renovated in 2026, the stadium and the surrounding Great Park served as the base camp United States Men's National Team for the 2026 FIFA World Cup. The stadium features locker rooms, concession stands, a specialized fan experience area, and a box office, as well as run on only renewable energy. The facility has been credited with aiding and accelerating Orange County and the surrounding Southern Californian area's youth development in soccer.

== History ==
The idea of a new, soccer-specific stadium in Orange County was born after the sale of the then Orange County Blues FC, when the club was sold to businessman James Keston in December 2016. Construction on the site began in early 2017, as part of a major $250 million redevelopment of the area in building a massive sports complex that included basketball, volleyball, and other sports facilities, as well as new homes.

After construction on the site was completed, the stadium opened up to the public on August 5, 2017 with a reduced capacity of 2,506, in an opening ceremony that included local soccer legends like Landon Donovan and Amy Rodriguez and a soccer match between Orange County high school all stars.

The Championship's first professional soccer match was on August 15 in a match between Orange County SC and the Tulsa Roughnecks with the continued reduced capacity, in a 0-0 draw. However, the first soccer match with the full capacity of 5,000 occurred on August 18 against Phoenix Rising SC. During the match, Phoenix's forward Chris Cortez became the first professional player to score a goal. However, on front of a sell-out crowd, midfielder Sola Abolaji scored the first home goal in the stadium's history in the 89th minute to result in a 1-1 draw.

Between 2018 and 2019, Orange County FC of the National Premier Soccer League, which has no relationship with Orange County SC, played some of their home matches at Championship Stadium.

The newly founded California United Strikers FC of the third tier National Independent Soccer Association moved into the venue in 2019, which made the stadium a shared venue. The Strikers would eventually move out in 2022.

In 2022, MLS Next Pro club LA Galaxy II (a reserve team for the LA Galaxy) entered discussions with the City of Irvine to use the stadium as its home venue beginning in the 2023 season. The leaked proposal included an exclusivity agreement that would have left Orange County SC without a home venue, causing protests from the club and other parties. The situation eventually ended up in favor of Orange County SC, with the club signing a new stadium lease in October 2023 with the city of Irvine to allow for a decade-long deal that runs until 2033.

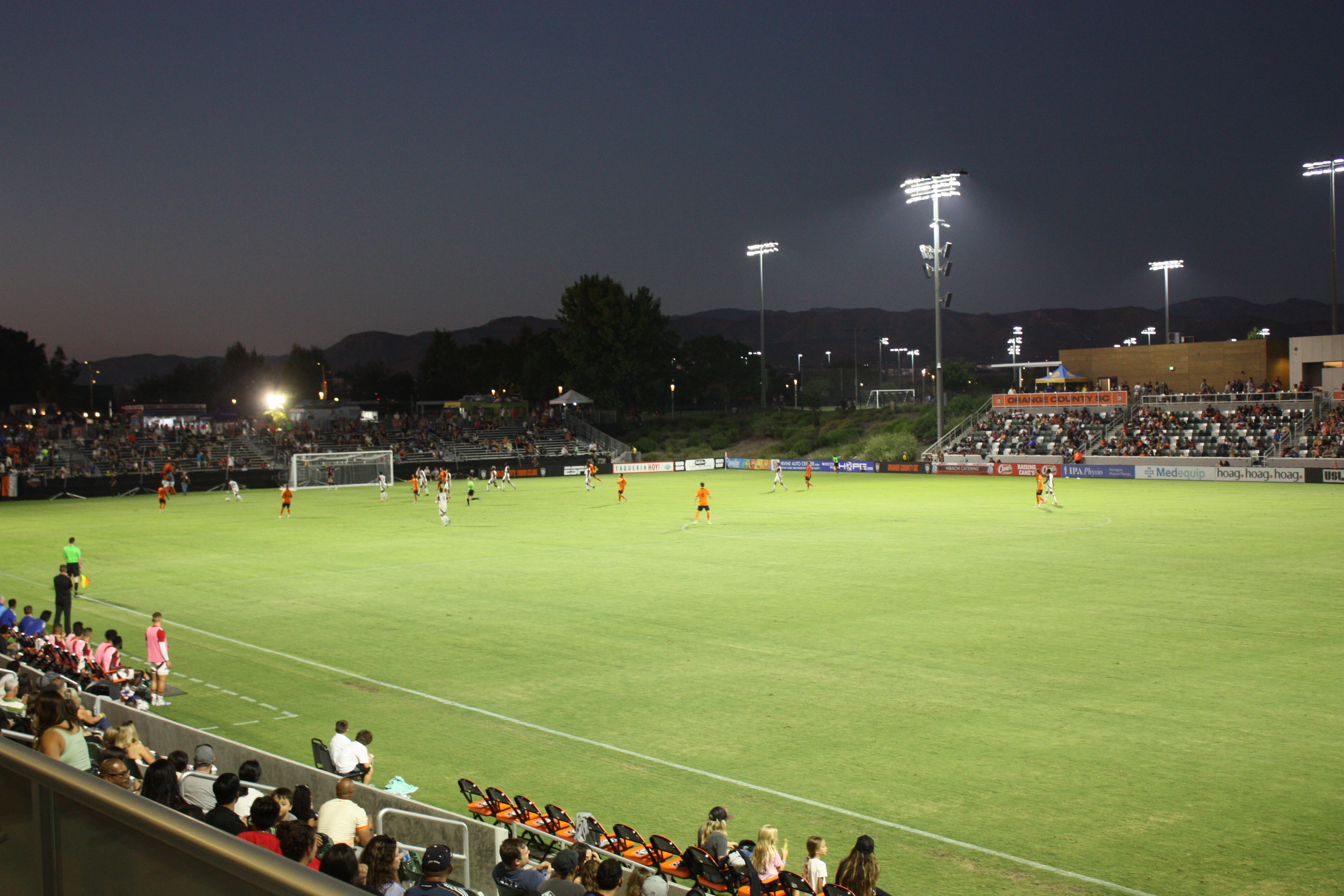
Night view of the stadium during a match in 2024

To accommodate the rapid growth of Orange County SC fans, the Championship Soccer Stadium was expanded in February 2026. The renovation added additional supporter's section bleachers, a party deck, and seats on the southern goal line, which had previously had no seating prior to the renovation. Coinciding the announcement of the renovations, the newly-formed California Legion of Major League Rugby announced that the Championship Soccer Stadium will be one of their multiple homes throughout California starting with their 2026 season.

Ahead of the 2026 FIFA World Cup, the OC Sports Commission was tasked with identifying a potential site to host one or multiple national teams in Orange County as a team base camp. After identifying possible venues, the Championship Soccer Stadium and the surrounding park was chosen to be advertised to FIFA, due to the park being one of the few venues in the area that met the requirements of having two FIFA regulation-sized soccer pitches and natural grass. The Championship and the Great Park was officially identified in June 2024 as a potential host site and on March 10, 2026, it was announced that the United States Men's National Team had chosen the site to be the USA's base camp for the 2026 World Cup. With the US Men's National team moving into the park, further renovations separate from the stadium expansion funded by Orange County SC were conducted, with the national team replacing the city-funded field with high-quality grass, major renovations to the stadium's locker rooms to accommodate a larger squad and more technological equipment, as well as construction of a new media work room.

== Events ==
=== Soccer ===
Championship Soccer Stadium has been the host of multiple lower-league and amateur league championships throughout its history. The first NISA Nation national championship match was hosted at the site in 2023, won by Northern Virginia FC. Since 2023, the United Premier Soccer League, a national amateur soccer league, has hosted the conclusive playoff rounds of their spring and fall seasons at the Championship Soccer Stadium.

== Transportation ==
The stadium has public transportation access via the Irvine Transportation Center, which is located on the southwest corner of the former footprint of the old Marine Corps Air Station El Toro and in walking distance from the stadium. From the station, access to both trains serviced by Amtrak and Metrolink, as well as bus services offered by both the city of Irvine and the county via OC Bus are available.
