= Chris Hegardt =

American soccer player (born 2002)

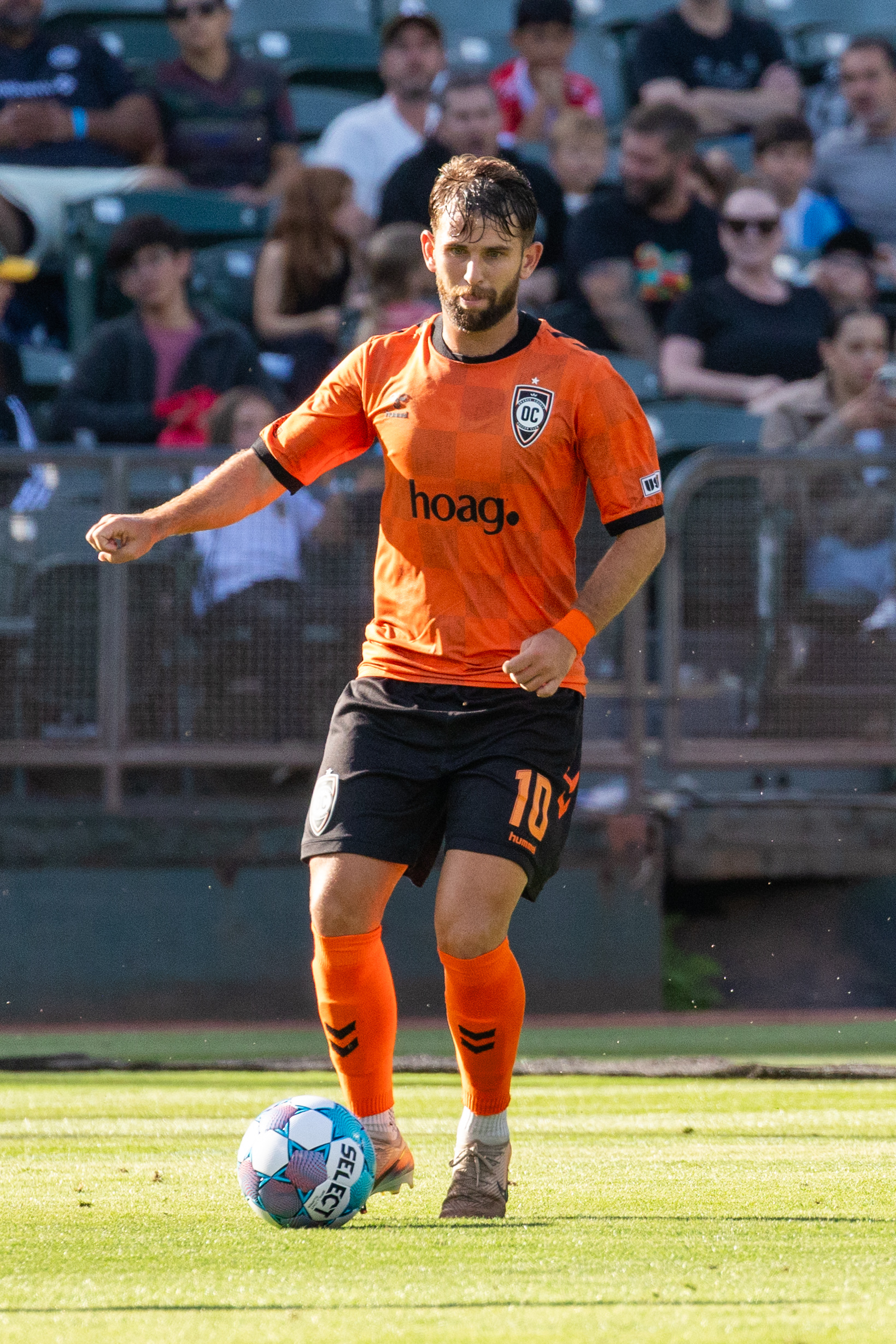

Personal information
- Full name: Christopher Hegardt
- Date of birth: January 6, 2002 (age 24)
- Place of birth: San Diego, California, United States
- Height: 5 ft 9 in (1.75 m)
- Position: Midfielder

Team information
- Current team: Orange County SC
- Number: 10

Youth career
- 2010–2016: San Diego Surf
- 2016–2017: LA Galaxy
- 2017–2018: ASC San Diego
- 2018–2020: Seattle Sounders

College career
Years	Team	Apps	(Gls)
2020–2021	Georgetown Hoyas	31	(3)

Senior career*
Years	Team	Apps	(Gls)
2019–2020	Tacoma Defiance	17	(1)
2022–2023	Charlotte FC	7	(0)
2022	→ Charlotte Independence (loan)	13	(3)
2023	→ Crown Legacy (loan)	7	(1)
2023	→ Loudoun United (loan)	6	(1)
2024	Stabæk	9	(0)
2024	→ Orange County SC (loan)	14	(1)
2025–	Orange County SC	59	(8)
- * Club domestic league appearances and goals as of October 31, 2026

Christopher Hegardt (born January 6, 2002) is an American soccer player who plays as a midfielder for Orange County SC in the USL Championship. He played in the Seattle Sounders Academy and for reserve side Tacoma Defiance before making his Major League Soccer debut with Charlotte FC in 2022.

== College career ==
Hegardt played for two seasons with the Georgetown Hoyas, scoring three goals in 31 matches. The Hoyas won the Big East tournament and advanced to the 2021 College Cup semifinals.

== Professional career ==
Hegardt made several appearances for the Tacoma Defiance of the USL Championship while enrolled in the Sounders FC Academy. He was traded in January 2022 to Charlotte FC in exchange for $50,000 of general allocation money. On June 17, 2022, Hegardt made a short-term stay on loan with USL League One side Charlotte Independence. He was released by Charlotte following their 2023 season.

After spending the 2024 USL Championship season with Orange County SC on loan from Stabæk, Hegardt signed a permanent deal with Orange County on January 17, 2025.

== Personal life ==
In December 2009, Hegardt was hospitalized after a youth soccer match and diagnosed with cancer following the discovery of a ruptured tumor in his liver. He went through six rounds of chemotherapy and received a liver transplant before returning in 2011 to the San Diego Surf, where Hegardt won a national championship. During his hospitalization, Hegardt received a visit and jersey from then-Chivas USA player Sacha Kljestan. The two were reunited 12 years later in Charlotte FC's home debut against the LA Galaxy, where Hegardt played against Kljestan's Galaxy.

Hegardt is also a fan of Arsenal FC.

== Career statistics ==
=== Club ===
As of 18 August 2024

Appearances and goals by club, season and competition
Club	Season	League			National Cup		Continental		Total	
Club	Season	Division	Apps	Goals	Apps	Goals	Apps	Goals	Apps	Goals
Tacoma Defiance	2019	USL Championship	6	0	—		—		6	0
Tacoma Defiance	2020	USL Championship	11	1	—		—		11	1
Tacoma Defiance	Total		17	1	—		—		17	1
Charlotte FC	2022	MLS	3	0	—		—		3	0
Charlotte FC	2023	MLS	4	0	3	0	0	0	7	0
Charlotte FC	Total		7	0	3	0	0	0	10	0
Charlotte Independence (loan)	2022	USL League One	14	3	—		—		14	3
Crown Legacy (loan)	2023	MLS Next Pro	7	1	—		—		7	1
Loudoun United (loan)	2023	USL Championship	6	1	—		—		6	1
Stabæk	2024	1. divisjon	9	0	1	0	—		10	0
Orange County (loan)	2024	USL Championship	4	0	—		—		4	0
Career Total			64	6	4	0	0	0	68	6
