= Orange County SC =

American soccer team in Irvine, California

- Full name: Orange County Soccer Club
- Founded: 1998; 28 years ago (as Los Angeles Blues)
- Stadium: Championship Soccer Stadium; Irvine, California
- Capacity: 5,000
- Owners: James Keston; Community Ownership
- Coach: Danny Stone
- League: USL Championship
- 2025: 6th, Western Conference; Playoffs: Conference Semifinals
- Website: orangecountysoccer.com
Home colors	Away colors

Orange County Soccer Club is an American soccer team based in the Orange County, California city of Irvine. Founded in 2010 as the Los Angeles Blues, the team currently plays in the Western Conference of the USL Championship, the second tier of the American soccer system.

The team plays its home games at Championship Soccer Stadium, located inside Great Park in Irvine.

== History ==
The then Los Angeles Blues were founded by Iranian-American businessman Ali Mansouri in 1998 and announced as a USL Pro expansion franchise on December 7, 2010. The team was associated with the United Soccer Leagues W-League team LA Blues, and is part of the larger Orange County Blues organization, which has competed in Los Angeles-area amateur leagues since 1998. They introduced their first three players—goalkeeper Oscar Dautt and midfielders Cesar Rivera and Josh Tudela—at a formal launch event on December 14, 2010.

After an extensive pre-season, the Blues played their first games in the Caribbean over the weekend of April 15–17, 2011, a 3–0 victory over Sevilla Puerto Rico, and a 2–1 victory over Antigua Barracuda. The first goal in franchise history was scored by Cesar Rivera.

In January 2012, the Blues announced the hiring of Steve Donner (formerly CEO of Orlando City) as vice president of business operations to focus on improving marketing for the club and to bring professionalism to the front-office. The first game of the 2012 season reflected these efforts with a 2,432 attendance compared to 696 for the first home game in 2011 (the Blues averaged 382 during the 2011 season).

In September 2016, the team was purchased by American businessman James Keston for $5 million and rebranded to Orange County SC. Keston had unsuccessfully attempted to purchase expansion teams in Major League Soccer for Portland, Oregon, and Seattle in the 2000s. Prior to the 2017 season, Orange County became the USL affiliate of Los Angeles FC in a multi-year deal, which was ended after 2018. The team won the Western Conference Regular Season Title in 2018 with 20 Wins, 8 losses and 6 ties. They defeated Saint Louis FC and Reno 1868 FC before losing 2–1 to Phoenix Rising FC in the Western Conference Final. Thomas Enevoldsen scored 20 goals and was named to the All-League First Team along with Aodhan Quinn.

In the 2021 season, Head Coach Braden Cloutier was dismissed mid-season and replaced by Assistant Coach Richard Chaplow. OCSC went on to finish second in the Pacific Division, and advance to the USL Championship Final, defeating Tampa Bay Rowdies away at St. Petersburg, Florida, 3–1 in regulation.

The 2022 season saw Richard Chaplow earn a last place Western Conference finish, despite Milan Iloski earning the USL Championship Golden Boot award. Orange County SC finished the 2022 season 7-14-13 with 34 points, last in the Western Conference.

The 2023 season also did not start strongly for Orange County, with just one win in eight games, with a 1-4-3 record before the team relieved Chaplow of duties and promoted newly hired assistant coach Morten Karlsen to interim head coach on May 1, 2023. Karlsen led the team to a season-end 2nd place Western Conference placement at 17-11-6, earning two consecutive USL Championship Coach of the Month awards for July and August. Coach Karlsen was appointed as head coach on a multi-year contract, announced November 2023.

Orange County lost star forward Milan Iloski during the 2024 January transfer window to Danish Superliga club FC Nordsjælland. The loss of the former Golden Boot winner resulted in Orange County having a mediocre start to their 2024 season, with a record of 6-3-6 by late June. This start contributed to Coach Karlsen making a transfer in the middle of the season to another club in the Danish Superliga, Lyngby BK. He was replaced by the assistant coach, Paul Hardyman, who after being labelled as an interim coach, was promoted to lead as the official coach, before he himself was sacked by the team and replaced by another assistant coach Danny Stone after a six-game winless streak. Under Danny Stone, Orange County was able to rescue their season and clinch a visit to the playoffs, where they were eliminated in the Western conference semi-finals against the Colorado Springs Switchbacks FC.

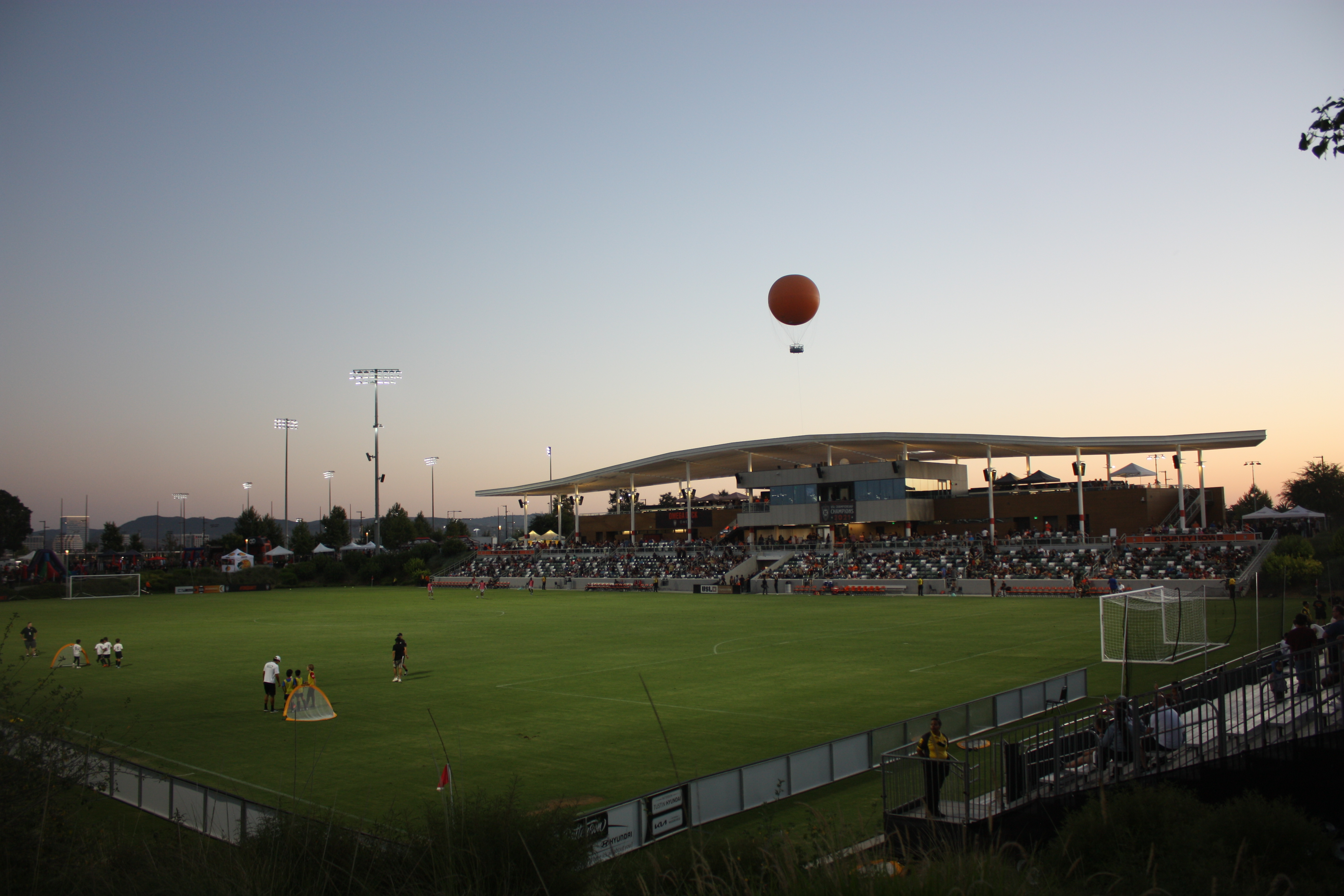
View of the main grandstand in the Championship Soccer Stadium on August 3, 2024, from the Northwest corner of the stadium

== Stadium ==
- Titan Stadium; Fullerton, California (2011–2013)
- Anteater Stadium; Irvine, California (2014–2016)
- Championship Soccer Stadium; Irvine, California (2017–present)

In October 2023, it was announced the City of Irvine and Orange County SC had drafted a 5-year agreement for the team to operate Championship Soccer Stadium. On October 23, City Council voted unanimously to approve the deal, striking a stadium naming right clause in the agreement for separate negotiation and later City Council approval. The 5-year agreement includes one 5-year renewal.

== Kits ==
=== Kit history ===
Home, away, and third kits.

- Home

2011	2012	2013	2014–15	2016	2017	2018	2019	2020

2021	2022	2023	2024	2026	2025

- Away

2011	2012	2013	2014	2015	2016	2017	2018	2019

2020	2021	2022	2023	2024	2025	2026

- Third

2019	2021	2022	2023	2024

== Club culture ==
=== Rivalry with Ventura County FC ===
Orange County competes in the 405 Derby against rivals Ventura County FC, formerly known as LA Galaxy II, nicknamed after Interstate-405, an interstate highway that links between Orange County and Los Angeles County. The clubs were in a dispute over who would play at Championship Soccer Stadium in late 2022, after leaked documents showed the Galaxy organization attempted to seize full-time usage of the venue. The rivalry has slowed down as of late, as after LA Galaxy II moved to MLS Next, the third tier of the American soccer system, both teams have only met in pre-season friendlies.

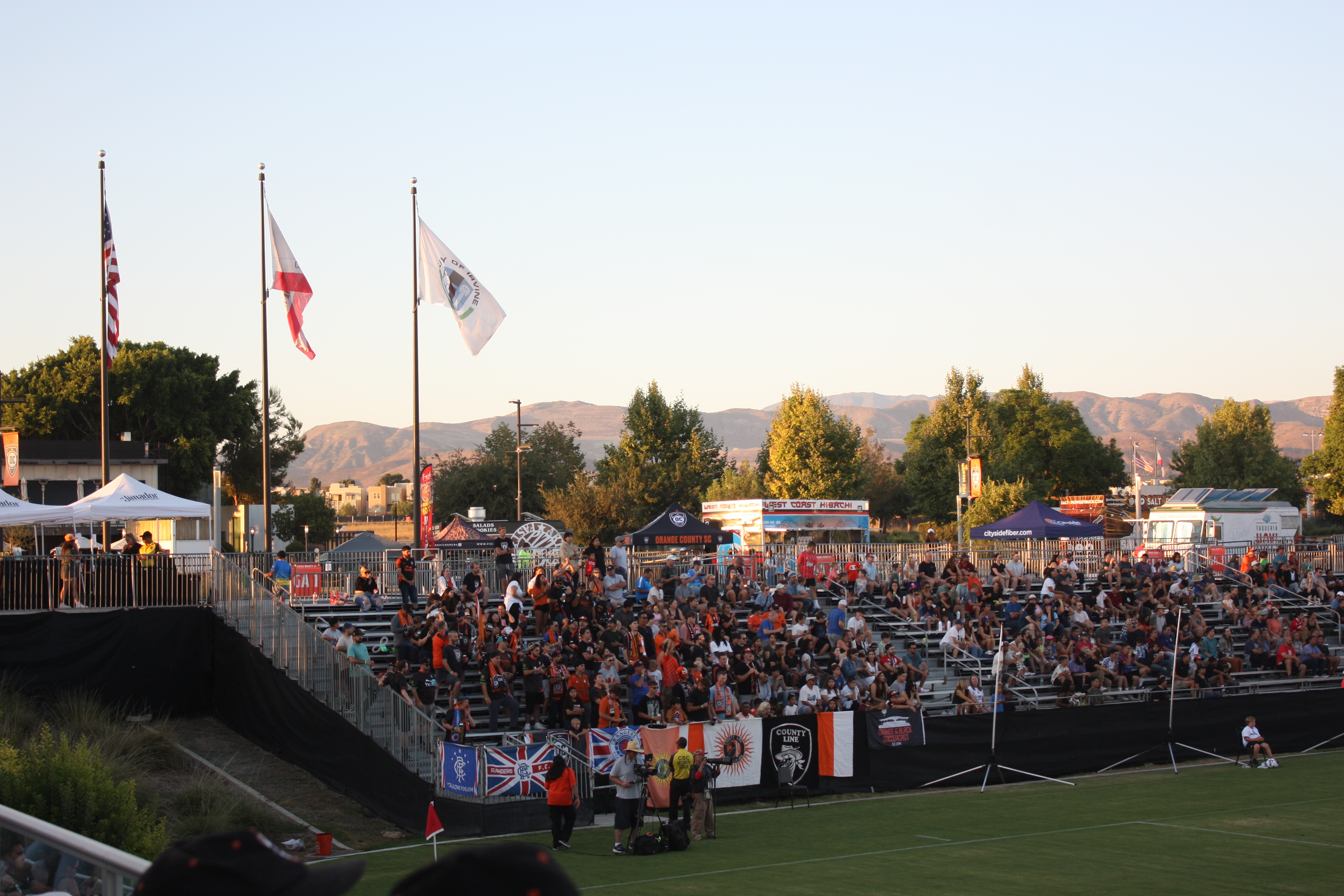
The County Line Coalition during an August 2024 match against North Carolina FC

=== Supporter groups ===
Orange County has one main supporter group, named the County Line Coalition. A zero-fee supporter group that was founded in 2014 in correspondence with the rebrand from the Los Angeles Blues to the Orange County Blues SC, they mainly sit in the left corner of the general seating bleachers behind the north goalpost, chanting and singing songs adapted to the tune of popular music, like "Take Me Home, Country Roads" by John Denver, amongst others.

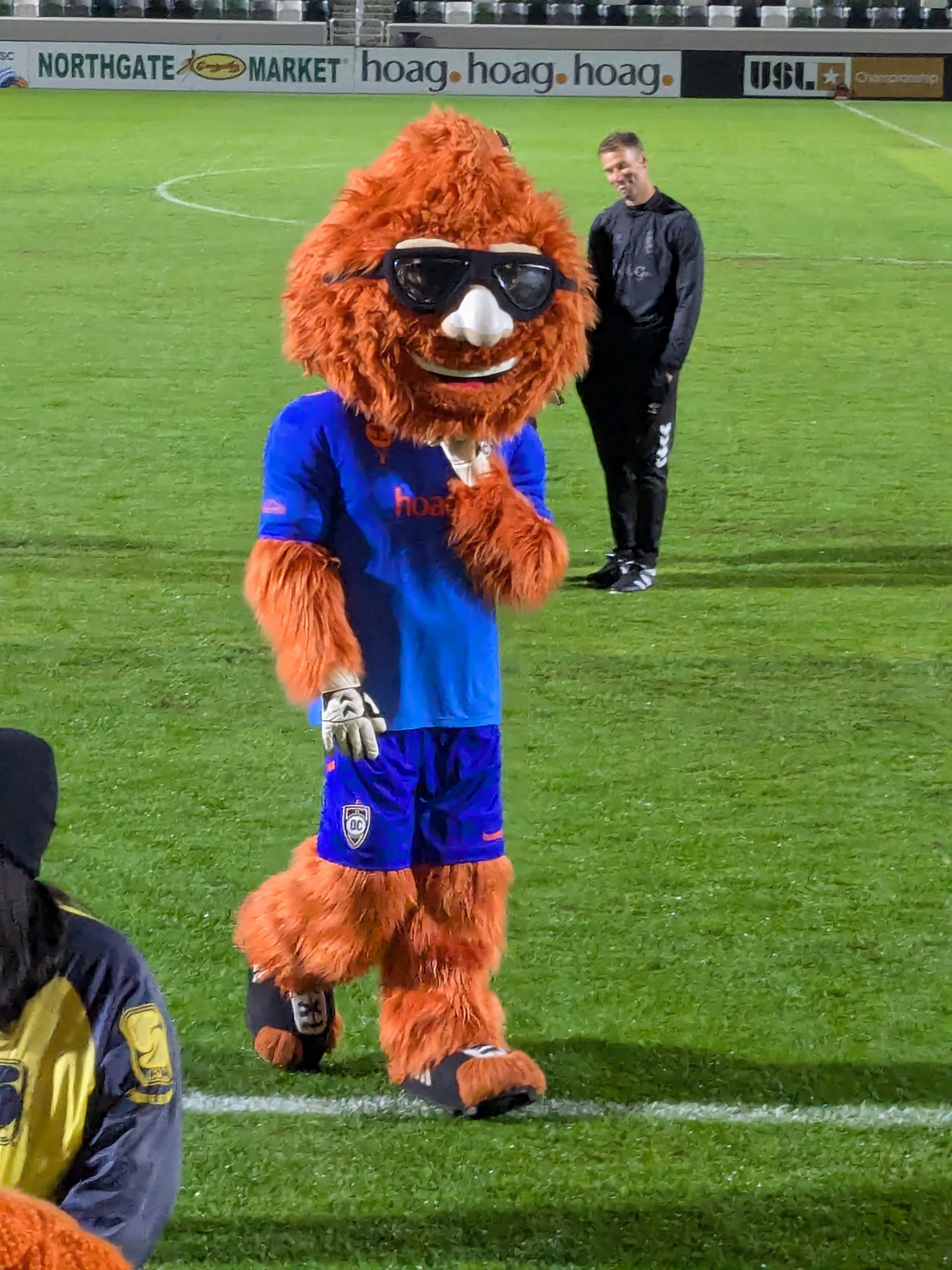
Gnarly after a March 2025 match

=== Mascot ===
On April 9, 2021, Orange County introduced their new mascot, Gnarly. He is an orange, surf-themed monster that can be typically seen on game day and at various Orange County SC activities around the county.

== Players and staff ==
=== Current roster ===
As of March 11, 2026

Note: Flags indicate national team as defined under FIFA eligibility rules; some limited exceptions apply. Players may hold more than one non-FIFA nationality.

No.	Pos.	Nation	Player
1	GK	USA	Alex Rando
2	DF	USA	Grayson Doody
4	DF	USA	Nico Benalcazar
5	DF	ENG	Tom Brewitt (Captain)
6	DF	USA	Garrison Tubbs (on loan from D.C. United)
7	FW	RSA	Sydney Wathuta (on loan from Colorado Rapids)
8	MF	SEN	Ousmane Sylla
9	FW	USA	Ethan Zubak
10	MF	USA	Chris Hegardt
11	FW	SUI	Lyam MacKinnon
12	FW	ISR	Yaniv Bazini
14	MF	USA	Brandon Cambridge
15	DF	USA	Tyson Espy
15	DF	USA	Jaylin Lindsey
17	FW	USA	Jamir Johnson

No.	Pos.	Nation	Player
18	MF	USA	Marcelo Palomino
19	MF	USA	Kevin Partida
20	FW	CAN	Mataeo Bunbury
21	FW	JPN	Mouhamadou War
22	FW	USA	Apolo Marinch
23	DF	NOR	Ryan Doghman
25	MF	USA	Efren Solis
27	MF	SCO	Stephen Kelly
28	DF	USA	Finn O'Brien
29	FW	USA	Elijah Nelson
30	FW	USA	Joaquin Castro
31	GK	JPN	Tetsuya Kadono
32	DF	USA	Nicola Ciotta
33	GK	USA	Jack Gentile
35	FW	USA	Jerome Carter

=== Front office ===
- (United States) James Keston – Owner & CEO
- (England) Peter Nugent – sports director
- (England) Dan Rutstein - interim president of business operations

=== Technical staff ===
- (England) Danny Stone - head coach
- (Wales) Robert Earnshaw – assistant coach
- (Switzerland) Didier Crettenand – assistant coach
- (United States) Victor Nogueira – goalkeeping coach
- (United States) Mitch Deyhle – director of sports medicine & head athletic trainer

=== Head Coaches ===
Years	Name	Nation
2011–2012	Charlie Naimo	United States
2012–2013	Jesus Rico-Sanz	Spain
2013–2014	Dariush Yazdani	Iran
2014–2016	Oliver Wyss	Switzerland
2016	Barry Venison	England
2017	Logan Pause	United States
2018–2021	Braeden Cloutier	United States
2021–2023	Richard Chaplow	England
2023–2024	Morten Karlsen	Denmark
2024	Paul Hardyman	England
2024–2026	Danny Stone	England

=== Club captains ===
Years	Name	Nation
2011	Josh Tudela	United States
2012	Shahryar Dastan	Iran
2013–2014	Allan Russell	Scotland
2015–2016	Didier Crettenand	Switzerland
2017–2018	Richard Chaplow	England
2019–2022	Michael Orozco	United States
2023–2024	Daniel Pedersen	Denmark
2025–present	Tom Brewitt	England

== Record ==
=== Year-by-year ===
This is a partial list of the last five seasons completed by the club. For the full season-by-season history, see List of Orange County SC seasons.

Season	League											Position		Playoffs	USOC	Continental / Other	Average attendance	Top goalscorer(s)	
Season	Div	League	Pld	W	L	D	GF	GA	GD	Pts	PPG	Conf.	Overall	Playoffs	USOC	Continental / Other	Average attendance	Name	Goals
2021	2	USLC	32	15	10	7	44	37	+7	52	1.63	2nd	7th	W	NH	DNQ	3,302	(Haiti) Ronaldo Damus	16
2022	2	USLC	34	7	14	13	49	59	-10	34	1.00	13th	23rd	DNQ	R3	DNQ	4,230	(United States) Milan Iloski	22 ♦
2023	2	USLC	34	17	11	6	46	39	+7	57	1.68	2nd	5th	SF	R3	DNQ	4,411	(United States) Milan Iloski	17
2024	2	USLC	34	13	14	7	40	47	-7	46	1.35	6th	14th	SF	R32	DNQ	4,138	(United States) Ethan Zubak	11
2025	2	USLC	30	10	11	9	45	47	-2	39	1.3	7th	13th	SF	R3	DNQ	4,470	(United States) Ethan Zubak	11

1. Avg. attendance include statistics from league matches only.
2. Top goalscorer(s) includes all goals scored in league play, playoffs, U.S. Open Cup, and other competitive matches.

== Honors ==
- USL Championship
  - Winners: 2021
- USL Championship Western Conference (playoffs)
  - Winners: 2021
- USL Championship Western Conference (regular season)
  - Winners (2): 2015, 2018
