= 2025 New Mexico United season =

New Mexico United
2025 season
- CEO: Peter Trevisani
- Head coach: Dennis Sanchez
- Stadium: Rio Grande Credit Union Field at Isotopes Park; Albuquerque, New Mexico
- USL: Western Conference: 3rd Overall: 6th
- USLC Playoffs: Conference Finals
- U.S. Open Cup: Third round
- USL Cup: Group stage
Home colors	Away colors	Third colors

The 2025 New Mexico United season was the seventh season for New Mexico United in the USL Championship, the second-tier professional soccer league in the United States.

== Roster ==
As of July 10, 2024Note: Flags indicate national team as has been defined under FIFA eligibility rules. Players may hold more than one non-FIFA nationality.

No.	Name	Nationality	Position(s)	Date of birth (age)	Season signed	Previous club	Apps.	Goals
Goalkeepers
1	Alex Tambakis	(Greece)	GK	December 8, 1992 (age 33)	2021	(United States) North Carolina FC		0
13	Kristopher Shakes	(United States)	GK	April 27, 2001 (age 24)	2024	(United States) Philadelphia Union Academy		0
Defenders
3	Christopher Gloster	(United States)	DF	July 28, 2000 (age 25)	2024	(United States) Atlanta United 2		
4	Anthony Herbert	(Trinidad and Tobago)	DF	April 18, 1998 (age 27)	2024	(Finland) FC Haka		
12	Jon-Talen Maples	(United States)	DF	November 20, 1998 (age 27)	2024	(United States) Houston Dynamo 2		
16	Will Seymore	(United States)	DF	February 29, 1992 (age 34)	2022	(Republic of Ireland) Finn Harps F.C.		
22	Kalen Ryden	(United States)	DF	April 12, 1991 (age 34)	2020	(United States) Real Monarchs		
24	Jaylin Lindsey	(United States)	DF	March 27, 2000 (age 26)	2025	(United States) Charlotte FC		
42	Jace Sais	(United States)	DF	January 17, 2006 (age 20)	2024	(United States) New Mexico United U23		
47	Jackson DuBois	(United States)	DF	February 22, 2006 (age 20)	2024	(United States) New Mexico United U23		
Midfielders
5	Dayonn Harris	(Antigua and Barbuda)	MF	August 29, 1997 (age 28)	2024	(United States) Tampa Bay Rowdies		
6	Gedion Zelalem	(United States)	MF	January 26, 1997 (age 29)	2024	(Croatia) NK Lokomotiva Zagreb		
7	Sergio Rivas	(Mexico)	AM	October 3, 1997 (age 28)	2021	(United States) Reno 1868		
8	Marlon Vargas	(United States)	MF	September 21, 1998 (age 27)	2023	(United States) FC Dallas		
9	Marco Micaletto	(Italy)	MF	January 19, 1996 (age 30)	2024	(United States) Columbus Crew 2		
15	Avionne Flanagan	(United States)	MF	April 6, 1999 (age 26)	2024	(United States) Charlotte Independence		
19	Cristian Nava	(United States)	MF	September 2, 2003 (age 22)	2021	(United States) New Mexico United U23		
27	Yuto Oketani	(Japan)	MF	March 27, 2005 (age 21)	2024	(United States) New Mexico United U23		
Forwards
10	McKinze Gaines	(United States)	CF	March 2, 1998 (age 28)	2024	(United States) Houston Dynamo 2		
11	Mukwelle Akale	(United States)	LW/RW	January 18, 1997 (age 29)	2024	(United States) Tormenta FC		
17	Greg Hurst	(Scotland)	CF	April 8, 1997 (age 28)	2023	(United States) Phoenix Rising FC		
23	Thomas Amang	(Cameroon)	CF	February 9, 1998 (age 28)	2024	(United States) Orange County SC		
25	Daniel Bruce	(England)	LW	May 13, 1996 (age 29)	2019	(United States) UNC Charlotte 49ers		
54	Derek Lozano-Villa	(United States)	LW	June 6, 2005 (age 20)	2024	(United States) New Mexico United U23		

== Competitions ==
=== USL Championship ===
==== Standings ====
Pos	Team	Pld	W	L	T	GF	GA	GD	Pts	Qualification
1	FC Tulsa	30	16	5	9	50	30	+20	57	Playoffs
2	Sacramento Republic FC	30	13	8	9	44	27	+17	48 (Note: Sacramento Republic FC are ahead of New Mexico United on head-to-head points: SAC 6, NMU 0.)	Playoffs
3	New Mexico United	30	14	10	6	45	41	+4	48	Playoffs
4	El Paso Locomotive FC	30	10	9	11	47	45	+2	41	Playoffs
5	Phoenix Rising FC	30	9	8	13	48	48	0	40 (Note: Phoenix Rising FC are ahead of San Antonio FC on head-to-head points: PHX 6, SAN 0.)	Playoffs

Source: USL Championship Standings
Rules for classification: 1) head-to-head points; 2) head-to-head goal differential; 3) points-per-game within conference; 4) total wins; 5) total goal differential; 6) total goals scored; 7) points earned against top four Conference finishers; 8) disciplinary points; 9) coin toss or drawing of lots

==== Match results ====
On December 19, 2024, the USL Championship released the regular season schedule for all 24 teams.

All times are in Mountain Standard Time.

===== March =====
March 8, 2025	Sacramento Republic FC	2–1	New Mexico United	Sacramento, California
8:00 PM MST				Stadium: Heart Health Park

March 15, 2025	Las Vegas Lights FC	2–3	New Mexico United	Las Vegas, Nevada
8:30 PM				Stadium: Cashman Field

March 22, 2025	New Mexico United	1–0	El Paso Locomotive FC	Albuquerque, New Mexico
3:00 PM				Stadium: Isotopes Park

March 29, 2025	Miami FC	0–1	New Mexico United	Miami, Florida
5:00 PM				Stadium: Pitbull Stadium

===== April =====
April 12, 2025	New Mexico United	1−0	North Carolina FC	Albuquerque, New Mexico
7:00 PM	Akale (yellow card) 22'; Zelalem (yellow card) 38'; Jabang (yellow card) 67'; Amang 90+2'	Report	Perez (yellow card) 9'; Mentzingen (yellow card) 36'; Somersall (yellow card) 56'; Dolabella (yellow card) 71'	Stadium: Isotopes Park; Attendance: 10,291; Referee: Nabil Bensalah

April 23, 2025	New Mexico United	1−0	Monterey Bay FC	Albuquerque, New Mexico
7:00 PM	Seymore (yellow card) 26'; Jabang 29'	Report	Lara (yellow card) 90+3'	Stadium: Isotopes Park; Attendance: 6,713; Referee: Greg Dopka

===== May =====
May 3, 2025	El Paso Locomotive FC	3–0	New Mexico United	El Paso, Texas
7:00 PM	Cabrera 12', 51', 83'	Report		Stadium: Southwest University Park; Attendance: 7,059; Referee: Thomas Snyder

May 10, 2025	New Mexico United	1–2	Phoenix Rising FC	Albuquerque, New Mexico
7:00 PM	Tabakis (red card) 57'; Gaines 84'	Report	Avayevu 13'; Johnson 62'	Stadium: Isotopes Park; Attendance: 10,844; Referee: Ekaterina Koroleva

May 17, 2025	Orange County SC	0–3	New Mexico United	Irvine, California
8:00 PM		Report	Maples 28' (pen.), 53'; Fernando 79'	Stadium: Championship Soccer Stadium; Attendance: 5,000; Referee: John Matto

May 24, 2025	Oakland Roots SC	0–3	New Mexico United	Oakland, California
8:00 PM		Report	Gloster 3'; Bailey 6'; Akale 89'	Stadium: Oakland Coliseum; Attendance: 8,757; Referee: Trevor Wiseman

===== June =====
June 7, 2025	New Mexico United	1–1	Colorado Springs Switchbacks FC	Albuquerque, New Mexico
	Vargas 22'	Report	Ryden 41' (o.g.)	Stadium: Isotopes Park; Attendance: 9,862; Referee: Timothy Ford

June 14, 2025	Lexington SC	2−1	New Mexico United	Lexington, Kentucky
5:00 PM	Djeffal 66'; Zengue 73'	Report	Fernando 45'+6'	Stadium: Lexington SC Stadium; Attendance: 3,471; Referee: Matthew Thompson

June 21, 2025	New Mexico United	4−2	San Antonio FC	Albuquerque, New Mexico
7:00 PM	Lindsey 10'; Akale 59'; Fernando 90'+1'; Vargas 90'+3'	Report	Taintor 54' (pen.); Buckmaster 76'; Paredes (yellow card) 40' (yellow-red card) 88'	Stadium: Isotopes Park; Attendance: 9,801; Referee: Servando Berna Rico

===== July =====
July 4, 2025	Pittsburgh Riverhounds SC	1–0	New Mexico United	Pittsburgh, Pennsylvania
5:00 PM	Mertz 73'	Report		Stadium: Highmark Stadium; Attendance: 5,626; Referee: Rodrigo Albuquerque

July 12, 2025	New Mexico United	1–2	Charleston Battery	Albuquerque, New Mexico
7:00 PM	Maples 63' (pen.)	Report	Jabang 49' (o.g.); Rubín 68'	Stadium: Isotopes Park; Attendance: 11,072; Referee: Abdou Ndiaye

July 30, 2025	Hartford Athletic	0–4	New Mexico United	Hartford, Connecticut
5:30 PM		Report	Mamadou 17', 24'; Ngalina 26'; Edwards 82'; Gloster (yellow card) 87'	Stadium: Trinity Health Stadium; Attendance: 4,151; Referee: Elton Garcia

===== August =====
August 9, 2025	FC Tulsa	5–2	New Mexico United	Tulsa, Oklahoma
6:30 PM	Calheira 18' (pen.); St Clair 46'; Serrato 51'; ElMedkhar 54'; Dalou 83'	Report	Hurst 34'; Jabang 41'	Stadium: ONEOK Field; Attendance: 2,706; Referee: Jeremy Scheer

August 16, 2025	New Mexico United	2–2	Las Vegas Lights FC	Albuquerque, New Mexico
7:00 PM	Noël 5'; Maples (yellow card) 64' (yellow-red card) 66'; Amang 87'	Report	Herbert 12'; Pickering 74'	Stadium: Isotopes Park; Attendance: 11,581; Referee: Luis Arroyo

August 23, 2025	Louisville City FC	0−0	New Mexico United	Louisville, Kentucky
6:00 PM		Report		Stadium: Lynn Family Stadium; Attendance: 10,719; Referee: Brandon Stevis

August 30, 2025	New Mexico United	0–2	Sacramento Republic FC	Albuquerque, New Mexico
7:00 PM		Report	Bennett 52', 69'	Stadium: Isotopes Park; Attendance: 9,752; Referee: Mark Verso

===== September =====
September 6, 2025	San Antonio FC	0–1	New Mexico United	San Antonio, Texas
7:00 PM	Walker (red card)	Report	Archimede 67'	Stadium: Toyota Field; Attendance: 6,210; Referee: Alyssa Pennington

September 10, 2025	New Mexico United	4–0	Detroit City FC	Albuquerque, New Mexico
7:00 PM	Bailey 5'; Gloster 20'; Hurst 69'; Noël 90'+7'	Report		Stadium: Isotopes Park; Attendance: 7,347; Referee: Joshua Encarnación

September 13, 2025	New Mexico United	0–1	FC Tulsa	Albuquerque, New Mexico
7:00 PM		Report	Rivas 90'+3' (o.g.)	Stadium: Isotopes Park; Attendance: 9,177; Referee: Calin Radosav

September 20, 2025	Monterey Bay FC	1–1	New Mexico United	Seaside, California
7:00 PM	Gnaulati 48'	Report	Archimede 87'	Stadium: Cardinale Stadium; Attendance: 3,299; Referee: Matthew Corrigan

September 24, 2025	Colorado Springs Switchbacks FC	1–2	New Mexico United	Colorado Springs, Colorado
4:00 PM	Hanya 3'		Harris 64'; Moguel 83'	Stadium: Weidner Field; Attendance: 6,059; Referee: Muhammad Kaleia

September 28, 2025	New Mexico United	2–1	Lexington SC	Las Vegas, Nevada
6:00 PM	Vargas 7'; Maples 10' (pen.)	Report	Wu (red card) 38'; Epps 64'	Stadium: Cashman Field; Attendance: 8,439; Referee: Rodrigo Albuquerque

===== October =====
October 4, 2025	Phoenix Rising FC	0–1	New Mexico United	Phoenix, Arizona
6:00 PM		Report	Maples 90'+7' (pen.)	Stadium: Phoenix Rising Soccer Stadium; Attendance: 5,323; Referee: Atahan Yaya

October 11, 2025	New Mexico United	3–3	Orange County SC	Albuquerque, New Mexico
7:00 PM	Hurst 33', 35'; Keller 51'	Report	Trager 15', 39'; Kelly 45'+1'	Stadium: Isotopes Park; Attendance: 8,148; Referee: Thomas Snyder

October 19, 2025	New Mexico United	3–3	Oakland Roots SC	Albuquerque, New Mexico
3:00 PM	Akale 13'; Hackshaw 19' (o.g.); Maples 28' (pen.)	Report	Wilson 16' (pen.), 41' (pen.); Margvelashvili 82'	Stadium: Isotopes Park; Attendance: 8,756; Referee: John Griggs

October 24, 2025	New Mexico United	2−1	Rhode Island FC	Albuquerque, NM
7:00 PM	Akale 21'; Maples 44' (pen.)	Report	Dikwa (yellow card) 35'; Bacharach 38'; Ybarra (yellow card) 41'; Williams (yellow card) 82'	Stadium: Isotopes Park; Attendance: 10,125; Referee: Brandon Stevis

=== USL Championship playoffs ===
New Mexico qualified for the 2025 USL Championship playoffs by placing in the top eight seeds in the Western Conference. Being the third seed, New Mexico was given a home playoff match, hosting San Antonio FC on November 1st. At home, New Mexico beat San Antonio 2–0.

November 1, 2025 Conference Quarter-Finals	New Mexico United	2–0	San Antonio FC	Albuquerque, New Mexico
7:00 PM MT	Akale 20'; Noël 58'	Report		Stadium: Isotopes Park; Attendance: 8,287; Referee: Joshua Encarnación

November 8, 2025 West	New Mexico United	2–1	Orange County SC	Albuquerque, New Mexico
9:00 PM ET	Hurst 49'; Harris 90+4'	Report	Pinto 68'	Stadium: Isotopes Park; Attendance: 10,150; Referee: Elton García

November 15 West	FC Tulsa	3–0	New Mexico United	Tulsa, Oklahoma
8:30 PM	Calheira 39', 57'; Webber 76'	Report		Stadium: Oneok Field; Attendance: 9,180; Referee: Greg Dopka

=== USL Cup ===
New Mexico participated in the second edition of the USL Cup, the first edition to feature teams from both the USL Championship and League One.

==== Standings ====
Pos	Lg	Team	Pld	W	PKW	PKL	L	GF	GA	GD	Pts	Qualification
1	USLC	San Antonio FC	4	3	0	1	0	6	2	+4	10	Advance to knockout stage
2	USLC	New Mexico United	4	1	2	1	0	9	7	+2	8	
3	USLC	Colorado Springs Switchbacks FC	4	2	0	1	1	7	4	+3	7	
4	USLC	Phoenix Rising FC	4	1	2	0	1	10	10	0	7	
5	USLC	El Paso Locomotive FC	4	1	1	1	1	3	3	0	6	

Updated to match(es) played on July 26, 2025. Source: USL

==== Group stage ====
April 26, 2025	New Mexico United	2−0	Union Omaha	Albuquerque, New Mexico
7:00 PM MDT	Maples 42' (pen.); Seymore (yellow card) 46'; Akale (yellow card) 86'; Vargas 90+3'	Report	Ouamri (yellow card) 6'; Schneider (yellow card) 15'; Kallman (yellow card) 25' (red card); Gómez (yellow card) 75'	Stadium: Rio Grande Credit Union Field at Isotopes Park; Attendance: 9,495; Referee: Brandon Stevis

May 31, 2025	Phoenix Rising FC	3–3 (3–2 p)	New Mexico United	Phoenix, Arizona
7:00 PM MST	Sacko 40' (pen.); Avayevu 45+2'; Scearce 70'	Report	Akale 14'; Fernando 57'; Gaines 63'	Stadium: Phoenix Rising Soccer Stadium; Attendance: 4,122; Referee: John Griggs
	Penalties
	Scearce (penalty scored); Dennis (penalty scored); Formella (penalty missed); Margaritha (penalty missed); Sacko (penalty scored)		(penalty missed) Bruce; (penalty missed) Maples; (penalty missed) Pondeca; (penalty scored) Seymore; (penalty scored) Ryden

June 28, 2025	New Mexico United	2–2 (3–2 p)	Colorado Springs Switchbacks FC	Albuquerque, New Mexico
7:00 PM MDT	Amang 24'; Maples 34' (pen.)	Report	Tejada 28'; Fontana 65'	Stadium: Rio Grande Credit Union Field at Isotopes Park; Attendance: 10,747; Referee: Nabil Bensalah
	Penalties
	Fernando (penalty missed); Jabang (penalty scored); Maples (penalty scored); Gloster (penalty scored)		(penalty missed) Adams; (penalty scored) Huerman; (penalty scored) Lacroix; (penalty missed) Zandi; (penalty missed) Mahoney

July 26, 2025	San Antonio FC	2–2 (0–3 p)	New Mexico United	San Antonio, Texas
8:00 PM CDT	Agudelo 8', 51'	Report	Noël 90+2'; Harris 90+9'	Stadium: Toyota Field; Attendance: 6,092; Referee: Matthew Corrigan
	Penalties
	Hernández (penalty missed); Taintor (penalty missed); Neville (penalty missed)		(penalty scored) Hurst; (penalty scored) Akale; (penalty scored) Maples

=== US Open Cup ===
April 16	New Mexico United	2–2 (a.e.t.) (1–4 p)	(Texas) El Paso Locomotive (USLC)	Albuquerque, New Mexico
7:30 p.m. MDT	Vargas 39'; Lindsey 72'	Report	Carter 21'; Cabrera Jr. 90+7'	Stadium: UNM Soccer Complex; Referee: John Griggs
	Penalties
	Zelalem (penalty missed); Maples (penalty scored); Ryden (penalty missed)		(penalty scored) Coronado; (penalty scored) Ruiz; (penalty scored) Torres; (penalty scored) Cabrera Jr.
