= 2026 New Mexico United season =

New Mexico United
2026 season
- CEO: Peter Trevisani
- Head coach: Dennis Sanchez
- Stadium: Rio Grande Credit Union Field at Isotopes Park; Albuquerque, New Mexico
- USL: Western Conference: 1st
- USLC Playoffs: TBD
- U.S. Open Cup: Second round
- USL Cup: Group stage
Home colors	Away colors	Third colors

The 2026 New Mexico United season is the eighth season for New Mexico United in the USL Championship, the second-tier professional soccer league in the United States.

== Roster ==
As of March 23, 2026Note: Flags indicate national team as has been defined under FIFA eligibility rules. Players may hold more than one non-FIFA nationality.

No.	Name	Nationality	Position(s)	Date of birth (age)	Season signed	Previous club	Apps.	Goals
Goalkeepers
13	Kristopher Shakes	(United States)	GK	April 27, 2001 (age 25)	2024	(United States) Philadelphia Union Academy		0
54	Taren White	(United States)	GK		2026	(United States) New Mexico United Academy		0
56	Raiko Arozarena	(Cuba)	GK	March 27, 1997 (age 29)	2026	(United States) Las Vegas Lights FC		0
Defenders
2	Niko Hämäläinen	(Finland)	DF	March 5, 1997 (age 29)	2026	(Norway) FK Haugesund		
3	Christopher Gloster	(United States)	DF	July 28, 2000 (age 26)	2024	(United States) Atlanta United 2		
4	Kipp Keller	(United States)	DF	July 14, 2000 (age 26)	2025	(United States) Minnesota United FC		
16	Will Seymore	(United States)	DF	February 29, 1992 (age 34)	2022	(Republic of Ireland) Finn Harps F.C.		
19	Zico Bailey	(Philippines)	DF	August 27, 2000 (age 26)	2023	(United States) San Antonio FC		
27	Maliek Howell	(Jamaica)	DF	January 27, 1999 (age 27)	2026	(United States) Birmingham Legion FC		
79	Kyle Hofmann	(United States)	DF	April 16, 2007 (age 19)	2026	(United States) New Mexico United Academy		
Midfielders
5	Dayonn Harris	(Antigua and Barbuda)	MF	August 29, 1997 (age 29)	2024	(United States) Tampa Bay Rowdies		
6	Gedion Zelalem	(United States)	MF	January 26, 1997 (age 29)	2024	(Croatia) NK Lokomotiva Zagreb		
15	Ousman Jabang	(United States)	MF	March 24, 2001 (age 25)	2025	(Canada) CF Montréal		
18	Sofiane Djeffal	(France)	MF	April 19, 1999 (age 27)	2026	(United States) Lexington SC		
21	Valentin Noël	(France)	MF	April 27, 1999 (age 27)	2025	(United States) Las Vegas Lights FC		
Forwards
7	Niall Reid-Stephen	(Barbados)	RW	September 8, 2001 (age 25)	2026	(United States) Tormenta FC		
8	Marlon Vargas	(United States)	FW	September 21, 1998 (age 28)	2023	(United States) FC Dallas		
9	Justin Rennicks	(United States)	CF	March 20, 1999 (age 27)	2026	(Finland) AC Oulu		
10	Greg Hurst	(Scotland)	CF	April 8, 1997 (age 29)	2023	(United States) Phoenix Rising FC		
11	Cristian Nava	(United States)	FW	September 2, 2003 (age 23)	2021	(United States) New Mexico United U23		
17	Jake LaCava	(United States)	RW	January 12, 2001 (age 25)	2026	(United States) San Antonio FC		
29	Luther Archimède	(Guadeloupe)	CF	September 17, 1999 (age 27)	2025	(United States) Monterey Bay FC		
31	Joseph Melto Quiah	(Liberia)	FW	October 29, 2004 (age 22)	2026	(Canada) Toronto FC II		
48	Grady Gilchrist	(United States)	FW	October 4, 2006 (age 20)	2026	(United States) New Mexico United Academy		

=== Out on loan ===
No.	Name	Nationality	Position(s)	Date of birth (age)	Season signed	On loan to
47	Jackson DuBois	(United States)	DF	February 22, 2006 (age 20)	2024	(United States) North Texas SC

== Competitions ==
=== USL Championship ===
==== Standings ====
Pos	Team	Pld	W	L	T	GF	GA	GD	Pts	Qualification
1	New Mexico United	30	15	8	7	45	34	+11	52	Playoffs
2	Sacramento Republic FC	30	13	5	12	42	28	+14	51	Playoffs
3	El Paso Locomotive FC	30	15	10	5	48	38	+10	50	Playoffs
4	Lexington SC	30	14	10	6	57	39	+18	48	Playoffs
5	Colorado Springs Switchbacks FC	30	13	9	8	44	38	+6	47	Playoffs

Updated to match(es) played on October 24, 2026. Source: USL Championship Standings
Rules for classification: 1) total wins against conference opponents; 2) goal differential against conference opponents; 3) goals scored against conference opponents; 4) head-to-head points against conference opponents; 5) points per game against conference opponents; 6) points per game against non-conference opponents; 7) fewest disciplinary points; 8) coin toss or drawing of lots

==== Match results ====
On December 16, 2025, the USL Championship released the schedule for all 25 teams for both the regular season and the USL Cup.

All times are in Mountain Standard Time.

===== March =====
March 14, 2026 1	Oakland Roots SC	2–1	New Mexico United	Oakland, California
8:00 PM	Prentice 6'; Wilson (yellow card) 54'; Astorga 81' (o.g.); McCabe (yellow card) 90+1'; Spiegel (yellow card) 90+1'	Report	Hämäläinen (yellow card) 73'; Rennicks 82'	Stadium: Oakland Coliseum

March 21, 2026 2	San Antonio FC	1–0	New Mexico United	San Antonio, Texas
6:30 PM	Maldonado (yellow card) 28'; Hernandez (yellow card) 65'; Barbir 74'; Parano (yellow card) 75'; Johnson (yellow card) 90+5'	Report	Reid-Stephen (yellow card) 23'; Bailey (yellow card) 31'; Gloster (yellow card) 54'	Stadium: Toyota Field; Referee: Servando Berna Rico

March 28, 2026 3	New Mexico United	3–2	Colorado Springs Switchbacks FC	Albuquerque, New Mexico
1:00 PM	Hämäläinen (yellow card) 34'; Wilkerson (yellow card) 37'; Noël (yellow card) 49', (goal) 75'; Harris 64'; Rennicks (yellow card) 72'; Shakes (yellow card) 90+4'; Jabang 90+6'	Report	Creek (yellow card) 15'; Tejada (yellow card) 32'; Bennett 57' (pen.), 90+4' (pen.)	Stadium: Isotopes Park; Attendance: 9,491; Referee: Cristian Campo Hernández

===== April =====
April 4, 2026 4	Orange County SC	0–1	New Mexico United	Irvine, California
8:00 PM	Hegardt (yellow card) 40'; MacKinnon (yellow card) 62'	Report	Reid-Stephen 32' (pen.); Gloster (yellow card) 52'; Jabang (yellow card) 75'	Stadium: Championship Soccer Stadium; Referee: Thomas Snyder

April 11, 2026 5	Phoenix Rising FC	3–0	New Mexico United	Phoenix, Arizona
8:00 PM	Sacko 13', 82'; Scearce (penalty missed) 34', (yellow card) 45+3', (goal) 76'; Moursou (yellow card) 51'	Report	Howell (yellow card) 25'; Gloster (yellow card) 63'; Noël (yellow card) 80'; Hurst (yellow card) 90'	Stadium: Phoenix Rising Soccer Stadium

===== May =====
May 6, 2026 6	New Mexico United	2–2	El Paso Locomotive FC	Albuquerque, New Mexico
7:00 PM	Hurst 14', 24'	Report	Rubin 12'; Abitia 86'	Stadium: Isotopes Park; Attendance: 7,758; Referee: Benjamin Meyer

May 9, 2026 7	New Mexico United	3–1	Las Vegas Lights FC	Albuquerque, New Mexico
7:00 PM	Reid-Stephen 32'; Jabang 53'; Bailey 73'	Report	Anderson 40'	Stadium: Isotopes Park; Attendance: 8,655; Referee: Deny Kulasinac

May 20, 2026 8	New Mexico United	0–1	Tampa Bay Rowdies	Albuquerque, New Mexico
7:00 PM		Report	Pérez 5'	Stadium: Isotopes Park; Attendance: 6,187; Referee: Ekaterina Koroleva

May 23, 2026	New Mexico United	1–0	Charleston Battery	Albuquerque, New Mexico
7:00 PM	Keller 81'	Report		Stadium: Isotopes Park; Attendance: 8,513; Referee: Trevor Wiseman

May 30, 2026	Hartford Athletic	0–0	New Mexico United	Hartford, Connecticut
7:00 PM	Makangila (yellow card) 19' (yellow-red card) 87'	Report		Stadium: Trinity Health Stadium; Attendance: 2,256; Referee: Matthew Thompson

===== June =====
June 13, 2026	New Mexico United	1–1	Orange County SC	Albuquerque, New Mexico
7:30 PM	Keller 2'	Report	Benalcazar 18'	Stadium: Isotopes Park; Attendance: 8,843; Referee: Elton García

June 20, 2026	Sacramento Republic FC	0–1	New Mexico United	Sacramento, California
9:00 PM		Report	Harris 73'	Stadium: Heart Health Park; Attendance: 10,777; Referee: Nabil Bensalah

===== July =====
July 4, 2026	New Mexico United	2–1	Oakland Roots SC	Albuquerque, New Mexico
7:30 PM	Nava 6'; Bailey 41'	Report	Wilson 67' (pen.)	Stadium: Isotopes Park; Attendance: 14,847; Referee: Brandon Stevis

July 15, 2026	Lexington SC	1–4	New Mexico United	Lexington, Kentucky
5:00 PM	Goodrum 70'	Report	Hurst 43' (pen.), 62'; Noël 45+3'; Quiah 68'	Stadium: Lexington SC Stadium; Attendance: 4,411; Referee: Elvis Osmanovic

July 24, 2026	Birmingham Legion FC	PP	New Mexico United	Birmingham, Alabama
6:00 PM		Report		Stadium: Dunnavant Valley Fields
Note: Postponed due to inclement weather.

===== August =====
August 1, 2026	New Mexico United	1–0	Colorado Springs Switchbacks FC	Albuquerque, New Mexico
7:30 PM	Howell 51'	Report		Stadium: Isotopes Park; Attendance: 10,264; Referee: Edson Carvajal

August 8, 2026	Monterey Bay FC	2–5	New Mexico United	Seaside, California
8:00 PM	Nakamura 31'; Lletget 55'	Report	Noël 6', 77'; Hurst 74'; Harris 86'; Reid-Stephen 90+1'	Stadium: Cardinale Stadium; Attendance: 3,011; Referee: Mark Verso

August 15, 2026	New Mexico United	1–0	FC Tulsa	Albuquerque, New Mexico
7:30 PM	Hurst 83' (pen.)	Report		Stadium: Isotopes Park; Attendance: 9,467; Referee: Elton García

August 22, 2026	Loudoun United FC	0–0	New Mexico United	Leesburg, Virginia
5:00 PM		Report	Quiah (yellow card) 10' (yellow-red card) 31'	Stadium: Segra Field; Attendance: 2,466; Referee: Erick Lezama

August 26, 2026	New Mexico United	2–1	Lexington SC	Albuquerque, New Mexico
7:30 PM	Keller 73'; Reid-Stephen 78'	Report	Muir 51'	Stadium: Isotopes Park; Attendance: 6,881; Referee: Amin Hadzic

August 30, 2026	New Mexico United	1–2	San Antonio FC	Albuquerque, New Mexico
7:00 PM	Harris 46'	Report	Keller 7' (o.g.); Hernandez 52'	Stadium: Isotopes Park; Attendance: 8,335; Referee: Matthew Corrigan

===== September =====
September 5, 2026	Las Vegas Lights FC	1–2	New Mexico United	Las Vegas, Nevada
8:30 PM	Anderson 29'	Report	Hurst 34'; Keller 79'	Stadium: Cashman Field; Attendance: 2,611; Referee: Muhammad Kaleia

September 11, 2026	New Mexico United	2–2	Indy Eleven	Albuquerque, New Mexico
7:30 PM	Archimede 16'; Hurst 18'	Report	Henry-Scott 50'; Blake 59'	Stadium: Isotopes Park; Attendance: 8,234; Referee: Igor Bych

September 19, 2026	Colorado Springs Switchbacks FC	0–0	New Mexico United	Colorado Springs, Colorado
7:00 PM		Report		Stadium: Weidner Field; Referee: Corbyn May

September 26, 2026	New Mexico United	2–3	Sacramento Republic FC	Albuquerque, New Mexico
7:00 PM	Hurst 73'; Archimede 85'	Report	Rodríguez 12' (pen.), 49'; Edwards 78'	Stadium: Isotopes Park; Attendance: 10,067; Referee: Rodrigo Albuquerque

September 30, 2026	FC Tulsa	1–0	New Mexico United	Tulsa, Oklahoma
6:00 PM	Wilson 19'	Report	Hamalainen (yellow card) 45+2' (yellow-red card) 54'	Stadium: ONEOK Field; Attendance: 4,610; Referee: Joshua Encarnación

===== October =====
October 3, 2026	New Mexico United	2–1	Phoenix Rising FC	Albuquerque, New Mexico
7:00 PM	Hurst 5'; Wilkerson 81'	Report	Arase 72'	Stadium: Isotopes Park; Attendance: 8,958; Referee: Ekaterina Koroleva

October 10, 2026	New Mexico United	3–1	Monterey Bay FC	Albuquerque, New Mexico
7:00 PM	Dennis 18', 27'; Hurst 56'	Report	Lletget 58'	Stadium: Isotopes Park; Attendance: 10,003; Referee: Cristian Campo Hernández

October 17, 2026	San Antonio FC	1–0	New Mexico United	San Antonio, Texas
6:30 PM	Calov 29'; Haakenson (red card) 80'	Report	Bailey (red card) 80'	Stadium: Toyota Field; Attendance: 7,154; Referee: Muhammad Kaleia

October 24, 2026	El Paso Locomotive FC	0–1	New Mexico United	El Paso, Texas
7:00 PM		Report	Noël 90+4'	Stadium: Southwest University Park; Attendance: 5,770; Referee: Calin Radosav

=== USL Championship playoffs ===
West Quarter-finals West Quarter-finals	New Mexico United	2–0	Phoenix Rising FC	Albuquerque, New Mexico
6:32 PM	Hurst 7'; LaCava 48' (yellow card) 63'	Report	Studenhofft (yellow card) 10' (yellow-red card) 75'; Moursou (red card) 52'; Kah (yellow card) 52'; Scearce (yellow card) 59'	Stadium: Rio Grande Credit Union Field at Isotopes Park; Attendance: 9,413; Referee: Muhammad Hassan

November 7 West Semi-finals	New Mexico United	4–0	Colorado Springs Switchbacks	Albuquerque, New Mexico
6:30 PM ET	Dennis 2' (yellow card) 49'; Hurst 29', 44'; Quiah 71'; Noël (yellow card) 80'	Report	Echevarria (red card) 90+2'; Masereka (yellow card) 90+4'; Foster (yellow card) 90+4'	Stadium: Rio Grande Credit Union Field at Isotopes Park; Attendance: 8,591; Referee: Joshua Encarnación

November 15 West Finals	New Mexico United	v	Sacramento Republic FC	Albuquerque, New Mexico
				Stadium: Rio Grande Credit Union Field at Isotopes Park

=== U.S. Open Cup ===
March 18, 2026 1	New Mexico United	3–2	Cruizers FC	Albuquerque, New Mexico
7:30 PM	Flores 12' (o.g.); Gilchrist 38'; Nava 90+1'; Wilkerson (red card) 90+6'	Report	Mbumba 16', 45+3'; Medina (red card) 90+10'	Stadium: UNM Soccer Complex; Referee: Cuauhtemoc Delgadillo

April 1, 2026 2	New Mexico United	0–4	El Paso Locomotive	Albuquerque, New Mexico
7:30 PM	Jabang (red card) 60'	Report	Quezada 36'; Mendez 63'; Rubin 69'; Calvillo 86'	Stadium: UNM Soccer Complex; Referee: Rodrigo Albuquerque

=== USL Cup ===
New Mexico participated in the third edition of the USL Cup, the second edition to feature teams from both the USL Championship and League One. Despite achieving second place in the standings for their group, New Mexico missed out on the wild card spot, ending their run in the 2026 USL Cup.

==== Standings ====
Pos	Lg	Team	Pld	W	PKW	PKL	L	GF	GA	GD	Pts	Qualification
1	USLC	Colorado Springs Switchbacks FC	4	4	0	0	0	10	1	+9	12	Advance to knockout stage
2	USLC	New Mexico United	4	3	0	0	1	8	5	+3	9	
3	USLC	El Paso Locomotive FC	4	2	0	0	2	5	5	0	6	
4	USL1	AV Alta FC	4	2	0	0	2	5	6	−1	6	
5	USLC	Phoenix Rising FC	4	1	0	0	3	3	8	−5	3	

==== Group stage ====
April 25, 2026	New Mexico United	2–1	AV Alta FC	Albuquerque, New Mexico
7:00 p.m.	Harris 36'; Rennicks 74'	Report	Aoumaich 18'	Stadium: Rio Grande Credit Union Field at Isotopes Park; Attendance: 9,605; Referee: Benjamin Meyer

May 16, 2026	Colorado Springs Switchbacks FC	4–0	New Mexico United	Colorado Springs, Colorado
7:00 PM	Keller 31' (o.g.); Hanya 34'; Fjeldberg 45'; Rocha 82'	Report		Stadium: Weidner Field; Attendance: 6,311; Referee: Abdou Ndiaye

June 6, 2026	New Mexico United	4–0	Phoenix Rising FC	Albuquerque, New Mexico
7:30 PM	Reid-Stephen 45+1'; Jabang 53'; Noël 70'; Harri 85'	Report		Stadium: Rio Grande Credit Union Field at Isotopes Park; Attendance: 9,389; Referee: Brad Jensen

July 11, 2026	El Paso Locomotive FC	0–2	New Mexico United	El Paso, Texas
7:00 PM		Report	Quiah 85'; Bailey 89'	Stadium: Southwest University Park; Attendance: 5,011; Referee: Jeremy Scheer
