= 2024 New Mexico United season =

New Mexico United
2024 season
- CEO: Peter Trevisani
- Head coach: Eric Quill
- Stadium: Rio Grande Credit Union Field at Isotopes Park; Albuquerque, New Mexico
- USL: Western Conference: 1st Overall: 3rd
- USL Cup Playoffs: Western Conference Semi-Finals
- U.S. Open Cup: Quarter-Final
Home colors	Away colors

The 2024 New Mexico United season was the sixth season for New Mexico United in the USL Championship, the second-tier professional soccer league in the United States.

== Roster ==
As of July 10, 2024Note: Flags indicate national team as has been defined under FIFA eligibility rules. Players may hold more than one non-FIFA nationality.

No.	Name	Nationality	Position(s)	Date of birth (age)	Season signed	Previous club	Apps.	Goals
Goalkeepers
1	Alex Tambakis	(Greece)	GK	December 8, 1992 (age 32)	2021	(United States) North Carolina FC		0
13	Kristopher Shakes	(United States)	GK	April 27, 2001 (age 24)	2024	(United States) Philadelphia Union Academy		0
Defenders
3	Christopher Gloster	(United States)	LB	July 28, 2000 (age 25)	2024	(United States) Atlanta United 2		
4	Anthony Herbert	(Trinidad and Tobago)	LB/CB	April 18, 1998 (age 27)	2024	(Finland) FC Haka		
12	Jon-Talen Maples	(United States)	CB	November 20, 1998 (age 26)	2024	(United States) Houston Dynamo 2		
15	Arturo Astorga	(United States)	CB	March 29, 1998 (age 27)	2023	(United States) New Mexico United U23		
19	Zico Bailey	(Philippines)	CB/LB	August 27, 2000 (age 25)	2023	(United States) San Antonio FC		
22	Kalen Ryden	(United States)	LB	April 12, 1991 (age 34)	2020	(United States) Real Monarchs		
26	Abdi Mohamed	(Somalia)	DF	October 25, 1996 (age 29)	2024	(United States) Columbus Crew 2		
33	Harry Swartz	(United States)	FB	March 19, 1996 (age 29)	2021	(United States) Hartford Athletic		
47	Jackson DuBois	(United States)	LB	February 22, 2006 (age 19)	2024	(United States) New Mexico United U23		
Midfielders
7	Sergio Rivas	(Mexico)	AM	October 3, 1997 (age 28)	2021	(United States) Reno 1868		
8	Dominick Hernandez	(United States)	CM	September 21, 1998 (age 27)	2023	(United States) FC Dallas		
10	Marco Micaletto	(Italy)	CM	January 19, 1996 (age 29)	2024	(United States) Columbus Crew 2		
16	Will Seymore	(United States)	CM	February 29, 1992 (age 33)	2022	(Republic of Ireland) Finn Harps F.C.		
25	Daniel Bruce	(England)	RW/RM	May 13, 1996 (age 29)	2019	(United States) UNC Charlotte 49ers		
27	Avionne Flanagan	(United States)	RB/RM	April 6, 1999 (age 26)	2024	(United States) Charlotte Independence		
42	Jace Sais	(United States)	CM/DM	January 17, 2006 (age 19)	2024	(United States) New Mexico United U23		
45	Cristian Nava	(United States)	CF	September 2, 2003 (age 22)	2021	(United States) New Mexico United U23		
58	Yuto Oketani	(Japan)	AM	March 27, 2005 (age 20)	2024	(United States) New Mexico United U23		
91	Houssou Landry	(Ivory Coast)	CM	December 28, 2000 (age 24)	2024	(United States) Loudoun United FC		
Forwards
5	Dayonn Harris	(Antigua and Barbuda)	CF	August 29, 1999 (age 26)	2024	(United States) Tampa Bay Rowdies		
9	Abu Danladi	(Ghana)	CF	October 18, 1995 (age 30)	2024	(Albania) KF Bylis		
11	Mukwelle Akale	(United States)	LW/RW	January 18, 1997 (age 28)	2024	(United States) Tormenta FC		
17	Greg Hurst	(Scotland)	CF	April 8, 1997 (age 28)	2023	(United States) Phoenix Rising FC		
20	Jacobo Reyes	(United States)	LW	August 11, 2000 (age 25)	2023	(Mexico) C.F. Monterrey		

=== Transfers in ===
Pos.	Player	From club	Date	Ref.
GK	(United States) Kristopher Shakes	(United States) Philadelphia Union Academy	February 27, 2024	
LB	(United States) Christopher Gloster	(United States) Atlanta United 2	January 16, 2024	
LB/CB	(Trinidad and Tobago) Anthony Herbert	(Finland) FC Haka	February 21, 2024	
CB	(United States) Jon-Talen Maples	(United States) Houston Dynamo 2	February 14, 2024	
DF	(Somalia) Abdi Mohamed	(United States) Columbus Crew 2	May 3, 2024	
LB	(United States) Jackson DuBois	(United States) New Mexico United U23	June 21, 2024	
CM	(Italy) Marco Micaletto	(United States) Columbus Crew 2	December 3, 2023	
RB/RM	(United States) Avionne Flanagan	(United States) Charlotte Independence	December 20, 2023	
CM/DM	(United States) Jace Sais	(United States) New Mexico United U23	March 5, 2024	
AM	(Japan) Yuto Oketani	(United States) New Mexico United U23	March 5, 2024	
CM	(Ivory Coast) Nanan Houssou	(United States) Loudoun United FC	February 23, 2024	
CF	(Antigua and Barbuda) Dayonn Harris	(United States) Tampa Bay Rowdies	January 5, 2024	
CF	(Ghana) Abu Danladi	(Albania) KF Bylis	January 10, 2024	
LW/RW	(United States) Mukwelle Akale	(United States) Tormenta FC	January 10, 2024	

==== Loans in ====
Pos.	Player	From club	Date	Until	Ref.
LW	(United States) Jacobo Reyes	(Mexico) C.F. Monterrey	July 14, 2023	End of season	

== Competitions ==
=== USL Championship ===
==== Standings ====
Pos	Team	Pld	W	L	T	GF	GA	GD	Pts	Qualification
1	New Mexico United	34	18	11	5	46	44	+2	59	Playoffs
2	Colorado Springs Switchbacks FC (C)	34	15	12	7	48	40	+8	52	Playoffs
3	Memphis 901 FC	34	14	11	9	52	41	+11	51	Playoffs
4	Las Vegas Lights FC	34	13	10	11	49	46	+3	50	Playoffs
5	Sacramento Republic FC	34	13	11	10	46	34	+12	49	Playoffs

Source: USL Championship Standings
Rules for classification: 1) head-to-head points; 2) head-to-head goal differential; 3) points-per game within conference; 4) total wins; 5) total goal differential; 6) total goals scored; 7) points earned against top four Conference finishers; 8) disciplinary points; 9) coin toss or drawing of lots
(C) Champions

==== Match results ====
On December 18, 2023, the USL Championship released the regular season schedule for all 24 teams.

All times are in Mountain Standard Time.

===== March =====
March 9 1	New Mexico United	1–0	Pittsburgh Riverhounds SC	Albuquerque, New Mexico
1:00 PM	Bailey (yellow card) 42'; Hurst 44'; Swartz (yellow card) 47'; Hernandez (yellow card) 90'; Harris (yellow card) 90'+1'; Micaletto (yellow card) 90'+4'	Report	Osumanu (yellow card) 35'; Diene (yellow card) 51'	Stadium: Isotopes Park; Attendance: 11,347; Referee: Ricardo Fierro

March 16 2	Rhode Island FC	1–1	New Mexico United	Smithfield, Rhode Island
1:00 PM	Fuson (yellow card) 39'; Ybarra (yellow card) 45'+1'; Stoneman (yellow card) 52'; Holstad (yellow card) 66'; Gloster 90'+2' (o.g.)	Report	Gloster (yellow card) 61'; Maples 68' (yellow card) 89'; Micaletto (yellow card) 77'	Stadium: Beirne Stadium; Attendance: 5,252; Referee: Jeremy Scheer

March 23 3	Charleston Battery	4–0	New Mexico United	Mount Pleasant, South Carolina
5:30 PM	Markanich 17'; Ycaza (yellow card) 19'; Rodriguez 56'; Molloy 64'; Conway 90'	Report	Seymore (yellow card) 9'; Bailey (yellow card) 20'; Akale (yellow card) 33'	Stadium: Patriots Point Soccer Complex; Attendance: 2,958; Referee: Nabil Bensalah

March 30 4	Phoenix Rising FC	0–1	New Mexico United	Phoenix, Arizona
6:30 PM	Formella (yellow card) 13'; Boye (yellow card) 57'; Doratiotto (yellow card) 64'; Hernández (yellow card) 65'; Novo (yellow card) 90'+12'	Report	Harris 16'; Akale (yellow card) 19'; Bailey (yellow card) 37'; Micaletto (yellow card) 45'+5'	Stadium: Phoenix Rising Soccer Stadium; Attendance: 7,172; Referee: Alexis Da Silva

===== April =====
April 6 5	New Mexico United	3–2	El Paso Locomotive FC	Albuquerque, New Mexico
7:00 PM	Micaletto 7'; Hurst (yellow card) 32'; Reyes 89'; Hernandez 90'+1'; Bruce (yellow card) 90'+4'	Report	Nevárez (yellow card) 45'+6'; Alfaro (yellow card) 51'; Rose (yellow card) 75'; Rivas 81'; Moreno 87' (pen.)	Stadium: Isotopes Park; Attendance: 9,019; Referee: Matthew Thompson

April 20 6	North Carolina FC	2–3	New Mexico United	Cary, North Carolina
5:00 PM	Placias 16'; Armstrong 28'; Craig (yellow card) 87'	Report	Hurst 19' 29' (pen.); Bailey (yellow card) 33'; Rivas 90'+1'	Stadium: WakeMed Soccer Park; Attendance: 1,916; Referee: Matthew Corrigan

April 27 7	Tampa Bay Rowdies	3–0	New Mexico United	St. Petersburg, Florida
5:30 PM	Jennings 7' 16'; Pérez (yellow card) 28'; Crisostomo (yellow card) 43'; Bodily (yellow card) 52'; Arteaga 58' (pen.)	Report	Hurst (yellow card) 45'+1'; Micaletto (yellow card) 65'	Stadium: Al Lang Stadium; Attendance: 6,588; Referee: Abdou Ndiaye

===== May =====
May 4 8	Las Vegas Lights FC	1–2	New Mexico United	Las Vegas, Nevada
7:30 PM	Adams (yellow card) 23'; Samake 44' (yellow card) 72'; Gannon (yellow card) 65'; Kimenta (yellow card) 72'	Report	Bruce 13' 30'; Herbert (yellow card) 39'; Astorga (yellow card) 82'; Tabakis (yellow card) 89'; Dubois (yellow card) 90'+4'; Bailey (yellow card) 90'+4'	Stadium: Cashman Field; Attendance: 1,061; Referee: Brad Jensen

May 11 9	New Mexico United	2–1	Oakland Roots SC	Albuquerque, New Mexico
7:00 PM	Hurst 2'; Mohamed (yellow card) 28'; Maples (yellow card) 45'+2'; Akale 74'	Report	Hackshaw 47' (yellow card) 73'	Stadium: Isotopes Park; Attendance: 11,568; Referee: Brandon Stevis

May 25 10	New Mexico United	2–1	San Antonio FC	Albuquerque, New Mexico
7:00 PM	Landry 35'; Herbert (yellow card) 38'; Hurst 45'+4' (yellow card) 55'; Bailey (yellow card) 61'	Report	Haakenson 21'; Burá (yellow card) 25'; Chol (yellow card) 42'; Lacey (yellow card) 45'+1'; Manley (yellow card) 80' (yellow-red card) 90'+5'	Stadium: sotopes Park; Attendance: 8,539; Referee: Matthew Thompson

===== June =====
June 2 11	Monterey Bay FC	1–0	New Mexico United	Seaside, California
5:00 PM	Greene (yellow card) 7'; Enríquez 64'; Baca (yellow card) 68'; Ngnepi (yellow card) 84'	Report	Hurst (yellow card) 39'; Flanagan (yellow card) 43'; Herbert (yellow card) 61'	Stadium: Cardinale Stadium; Attendance: 3,419; Referee: Servando Berna Rico

June 8 12	New Mexico United	1–0	Hartford Athletic	Albuquerque, New Mexico
7:00 PM	Hurst (yellow card) 35'; Bruce 86'	Report	Vancaeyezeele (yellow card) 2'; Monroe (yellow card) 67'; Buckmaster (yellow card) 71'; Mushagalusa (yellow card) 90'+3'	Stadium: Isotopes Park; Attendance: 10,884; Referee: Calin Radosav

June 15 13	Memphis 901 FC	2–1	New Mexico United	Memphis, Tennessee
6:30 PM	Lapa 13' (pen.); Turci 34'; Careaga (yellow card) 42'; Paul (yellow card) 53'; Yellow (yellow card) 62'	Report	Landry (yellow card) 14'; Akale (yellow card) 41'; Rivas (yellow card) 85'; Hurst 87'	Stadium: AutoZone Park; Attendance: 3,196; Referee: Elton García

June 22 14	New Mexico United	1–0	Colorado Springs Switchbacks FC	Albuquerque, New Mexico
7:00 PM	Herbert (yellow card) 56'; Bruce (yellow card) 80'; Maples 90'+2'; Flanagan (yellow card) 90'+3'	Report	Mahoney (yellow card) 45'; Herrera (yellow card) 90'+2'	Stadium: Isotopes Park; Attendance: 10,176; Referee: Corbyn May

June 29 15	San Antonio FC	2–3	New Mexico United	San Antonio, Texas
7:00 PM	Burá (yellow card) 22'; Agudelo 34' 37' (yellow card) 52'	Report	Taintor 2' (o.g.); Bailey (yellow card) 25'; Herbert (yellow card) 28'; Akale (yellow card) 36' (yellow-red card) 39'; Mohamed 44'; Hurst 51' (pen.)	Stadium: Toyota Field; Attendance: 6,625; Referee: Matthew Corrigan

===== July =====
July 3 16	New Mexico United	2–0	Orange County SC	Albuquerque, New Mexico
7:00 PM	Miles 50' (o.g.); Mohamed 73'; Bruce (yellow card) 76'	Report	Chattha (yellow card) 15'; Miles (yellow card) 71'; Chavez (yellow card) 72'; Jamison (yellow card) 83'	Stadium: Isotopes Park; Attendance: 12,147; Referee: Thomas Snyder

July 20 17	New Mexico United	1–1	Birmingham Legion FC	Albuquerque, New Mexico
7:00 PM	Rivas 60'; Bailey (yellow card) 65'; Maples (yellow card) 66'; Tabakis (yellow card) 81'	Report	Hamouda (yellow card) 15'; Paterson 81'	Stadium: Isotopes Park; Attendance: 9,096; Referee: Luis Arroyo

July 27 18	El Paso Locomotive FC	1–2	New Mexico United	El Paso, Texas
7:00 PM	Nevárez 21' (yellow card) 66' (yellow-red card) 78'; Stauffer (yellow card) 31'; Ruiz (yellow card) 60'; Rivas (yellow card) 70'; Zacarías (yellow card) 90'+5'	Report	Hurst 14' (pen.); Micaletto (yellow card) 23'; Bruce 68'; Rivas (yellow card) 90'+2'	Stadium: Southwest University Park; Attendance: 5,577; Referee: Elijio Arreguin

July 31 19	New Mexico United	1–2	Las Vegas Lights FC	Albuquerque, New Mexico
7:00 PM	Bruce 45'+5'; Houssou (yellow card) 85'	Report	Pinzón (yellow card) 4' (goal) 66'; Noël 12'; Nigro (yellow card) 79'; Jabang (yellow card) 90'	Stadium: Isotopes Park; Attendance: 7,558; Referee: Elvis Osmanovic

===== August =====
August 3 20	New Mexico United	0–1	Louisville City FC	Albuquerque, New Mexico
7:00 PM	Hurst (yellow card) 63'; Houssou (yellow card) 90+4'	Report	Harris (yellow card) 35'; Wilson 39'	Stadium: Isotopes Park; Attendance: 9,376; Referee: Brandon Stevis

August 11 21	Indy Eleven	1–3	New Mexico United	Indianapolis, Indiana
3:00 PM	Quinn (yellow card) 27'; Neidlinger 28'; Diz Pe (yellow card) 61'; Chapman-Page (yellow card) 78'	Report	Rivas (yellow card) 27'; Houssou (yellow card) 27'; Ryden (yellow card) 45+2'; Swartz 53'; Rivas 64'; Hurst 75'; Hurst (yellow card) 90+4'	Stadium: Michael A. Carroll Stadium; Attendance: 10,013; Referee: Adam Kilpatrick

August 14 22	New Mexico United	3–3	FC Tulsa	Albuquerque, New Mexico
7:00 PM	Reyes 3'; Micaletto (yellow card) 13'; Houssou (yellow card) 43'; Swartz 49', 63'; Tabakis (yellow card) 79'	Report	Diallo (yellow card) 8'; Souahy 15', 44'; Pacheco 45+1'; Yosef (yellow card) 68'; Stojanovic (yellow card) 79'; St Clair (yellow card) 90+4'	Stadium: Isotopes Park; Attendance: 7,015; Referee: Sergii Demianchuk

August 17 23	New Mexico United	3–2	Monterey Bay FC	Albuquerque, New Mexico
7:00 PM	Akale 13'; Reyes 28'; Seymore (yellow card) 52'; Ryden 78'	Report	Dixon 34'; Rebollar (yellow card) 45+4', (goal) 88'	Stadium: Isotopes Park; Attendance: 8,868; Referee: Ricardo Fierro

August 24, 2024 24	Colorado Springs Switchbacks FC	0–1	New Mexico United	Colorado Springs, Colorado
7:00 PM	Henríquez (yellow card) 69'; Mahoney (yellow card) 77'; Hanya (yellow card) 90+2'	Report	Akale 8'; Micaletto (yellow card) 10'; Bailey (yellow card) 52' (yellow-red card) 71'; Hurst (yellow card) 90+8'	Stadium: Weidner Field; Attendance: 8,023; Referee: Joshua Encarnación

August 31 25	Oakland Roots SC	1–0	New Mexico United	Hayward, California
4:00 PM	Gomez (yellow card) 51'; Rodriguez (yellow card) 57'; Hackshaw (yellow card) 63'; Reid (yellow card) 73'; Dwyer 76'	Report	Reyes (yellow card) 3'; Flanagan (yellow card) 44'; Quill (yellow card) 45'; Gloster (yellow card) 56'; Swartz (yellow card) 86'	Stadium: Pioneer Stadium; Attendance: 3,431

===== September =====
September 6 26	New Mexico United	1–0	Miami FC	Albuquerque, New Mexico
7:00 PM	Hurst (yellow card) 30'; Houssou (yellow card) 37'; Reyes 45'; Micaletto (yellow card) 47'	Report		Stadium: Isotopes Park; Attendance: 9,069; Referee: Gerald Flores

September 14 27	Detroit City FC	1–0	New Mexico United	Hamtramck, Michigan
3:00 PM	Rodriguez 20' (pen.); Sheldon (yellow card) 90+6'	Report	Shakes (yellow card) 89'; Quill (yellow card) 90+7'	Stadium: Keyworth Stadium; Attendance: 5,738; Referee: Eric Tattersall

September 18 28	New Mexico United	3–1	Sacramento Republic FC	Albuquerque, New Mexico
7:00 PM	Micaletto (yellow card) 36'; Mohamed 61'; Hurst 66', 74'; Houssou (yellow card) 71'	Report	Fernandes (yellow card) 42'; Herrera (yellow card) 89' (goal) 90'+1'	Stadium: Isotopes Park; Attendance: 7,193; Referee: Greg Dopka

September 22 29	New Mexico United	1–0	Loudoun United FC	Albuquerque, New Mexico
2:00 PM	Hughes 9' (o.g.); Ryden (yellow card) 22'; Seymore (yellow card) 31'	Report	Awuah (yellow card) 31'; Leggett (yellow card) 31'; Leerman (yellow card) 42'; Erlandson (yellow card) 85'; Williamson (yellow card) 90'+1'	Stadium: Isotopes Park; Attendance: 9,163; Referee: Ekaterina Koroleva

September 29 30	Sacramento Republic FC	4–0	New Mexico United	Sacramento, California
6:30 PM	Cicerone (yellow card) 3' (goal) 6'; Fernandes 25'; Portillo (yellow card) 34'; Timmer (yellow card) 38'; Aldair Sanchez 54'; Phillips 69'	Report	Ryden (yellow card) 45'+2'	Stadium: Heart Health Park; Attendance: 11,569; Referee: Brandon Stevis

===== October =====
October 9 31	New Mexico United	1–2	Phoenix Rising FC	Albuquerque, New Mexico
7:00 PM	Maples 28'; Landry (yellow card) 51'	Report	Zambrano (yellow card) 14'; Dennis (yellow card) 19' (goal) 59'; Ángel 48' (pen.) (yellow card) 67'; Azócar (yellow card) 89' (yellow-red card) 90'+5'; Cuello (yellow card) 90'	Stadium: Isotopes Park; Attendance: 8,319; Referee: Thomas Snyder

October 12 32	FC Tulsa	1–1	New Mexico United	Tulsa, Oklahoma
5:30 PM	Bibout 69'; St Clair (yellow card) 87'	Report	Reyes 55'; Seymore (yellow card) 79'; Hernandez (yellow card) 81'	Stadium: ONEOK Field; Attendance: 3,388; Referee: Joshua Encarnación

October 19 33	Orange County SC	0–0	New Mexico United	Irvine, California
8:00 PM	Zubak (yellow card) 90'+2'	Report	Seymore (yellow card) 17'; Ryden (yellow card) 42'; Dubois (yellow card) 69'; Hurst (yellow card) 76'; Landry (yellow card) 90'+6'	Stadium: Championship Soccer Stadium; Attendance: 4,675; Referee: Ricardo Montero

October 19 34	New Mexico United	2–3	Memphis 901 FC	Albuquerque, New Mexico
9:00 PM	Hurst 20'; Ryden (yellow card) 60'; Vargas 90'+4'	Report	Bakero 2'; Yacoubou (yellow card) 17'; Careaga 25'; Turci 63'; Cissoko (yellow card) 90'+9'	Stadium: Isotopes Park; Attendance: 10,220; Referee: Eric Tattersall

==== USL Cup Playoffs ====
November 3, 2024 West	New Mexico United	2–1	Phoenix Rising FC	Albuquerque, New Mexico
6:00 PM MST	Seymore 58'; Herbert (yellow card) 76'; Akale 85'	Report	Varela 49'; Fuenmayor (yellow card) 61'; Wyke (yellow card) 63'	Stadium: Rio Grande Credit Union Field at Isotopes Park; Attendance: 11,447; Referee: Lorenzo Hernandez

November 9, 2024 West	New Mexico United	0–1	Las Vegas Lights FC	Albuquerque, New Mexico
7:30 PM MST	Quill (yellow card) 40'; Akale (yellow card) 89'	Report	Hafferty (yellow card) 6'; Pinzón (yellow card) 54'; Bennett 86'; Gyau (yellow card) 87'	Stadium: Rio Grande Credit Union Field at Isotopes Park; Attendance: 10,049; Referee: Natalie Simon

=== U.S. Open Cup ===
As a member of the USL Championship, New Mexico United entered the U.S. Open Cup in the Third Round of the 2024 U.S. Open Cup. It was announced by the U.S. Soccer Federation on April 18, 2024, that New Mexico United would face off against Real Salt Lake, a member of the MLS, the first tier in American soccer.

April 16 Third Round	New Mexico United	3–1	(Texas) Lubbock Matadors SC	Rio Rancho, New Mexico
19:00 MDT	Swartz 58'; Bruce 59'; Akale 62'	Report	Sasaki 90' (pen.)	Stadium: Rio Rancho High School Stadium; Attendance: 1,200

May 8 Round of 32	New Mexico United	4–2	(Utah) Real Salt Lake	Albuquerque, New Mexico
19:00 MDT	Bailey 17', 19'; Hernandez 45+4'; Reyes 89'	Report	Barajas 35'; Luna 49'	Stadium: Isotopes Park; Attendance: 5,266; Referee: Malik Badawi

May 21 Round of 16	New York City FC II (New York (state))	0–3	New Mexico United	New York City, New York
19:30 EDT		Report	Flanagan 50'; Maples 65'; Herbert 86'	Stadium: Belson Stadium; Attendance: 534; Referee: Joshua Encarnación

July 10 Quarterfinals	Los Angeles FC (California)	3–1	(New Mexico) New Mexico United	Los Angeles, California
20:00 PDT	Tillman 6'; Martínez 37'; Bogusz 77'	Report	Landry (yellow card) 20'; Micaletto (yellow card) 22'; Hurst 57'	Stadium: BMO Stadium; Referee: Allen Chapman
