= Jacobo Reyes =

American soccer player (born 2000)

Personal information
- Full name: Jacobo Reyes Murillo
- Date of birth: August 11, 2000 (age 26)
- Place of birth: Houston, Texas, United States
- Height: 1.65 m (5 ft 5 in)
- Position: Winger

Team information
- Current team: Venados
- Number: 7

Youth career
- Monterrey

College career
Years	Team	Apps	(Gls)
2019	Portland Pilots	17	(3)

Senior career*
Years	Team	Apps	(Gls)
2020–2024	Monterrey	4	(0)
2021–2023	→ Raya2 (loan)	56	(6)
2023–2024	→ New Mexico United (loan)	39	(5)
2025–2026	Tepatitlán	37	(2)
2026–	Venados	8	(3)

International career
2015	Mexico U15	3	(0)
2017	United States U17	8	(0)
- * Club domestic league appearances and goals as of 7 September 2026

Jacobo Reyes Murillo (born August 11, 2000) is an American professional soccer player who plays as a winger for Liga de Expansión MX club Venados.

== Club career ==
Reyes started his career with Mexican top flight side Monterrey. In 2019, he joined the Portland Pilots in the United States. Before the second half of 2019–20, he returned to Mexican top flight club Monterrey. On October 24, 2021, Reyes debuted for Monterrey during a 0–1 loss to Necaxa. On July 14, 2023, Reyes signed on loan with USL Championship side New Mexico United for the remainder of their 2023 season.

On 24 May 2025, Tepatitlán announced they had signed Reyes for the 25/26 season.

== International career ==
He represented United States at the 2017 FIFA U-17 World Cup.

== Career statistics ==
=== Club ===
As of December 2nd, 2024

Club	Season	League			National cup		Continental		Other		Total	
Club	Season	Division	Apps	Goals	Apps	Goals	Apps	Goals	Apps	Goals	Apps	Goals
Monterrey	2021–22	Liga MX	1	0	–		–		–		1	0
Monterrey	2022–23	Liga MX	3	0	–		1	0	–		4	0
Monterrey	Total		4	0	–		1	0	–		5	0
Raya2 (loan)	2021–22	Liga de Expansión MX	28	3	–		–		–		28	3
Raya2 (loan)	2022–23	Liga de Expansión MX	28	3	–		–		–		28	3
Raya2 (loan)	Total		56	6	–		–		–		56	6
New Mexico United (loan)	2023	USL Championship	13	0	–		–		–		13	0
New Mexico United (loan)	2024	USL Championship	26	5	3	1	–		–		29	6
New Mexico United (loan)	Total		39	5	3	1	–		–		42	6
Career total			99	11	3	1	1	0	0	0	103	12

== Honors ==
Tepatitlán

- Liga de Expansión MX: Clausura 2026
- Campeón de Campeones: 2026
