= Arturo Astorga =

American soccer player

Personal information
- Date of birth: March 29, 1998 (age 28)
- Place of birth: El Paso, Texas, United States
- Height: 5 ft 8 in (1.73 m)
- Position: Defender

Youth career
- 2012–2015: Canutillo High School

College career
| Years | Team | Apps | (Gls) |
| 2016–2019 | Azusa Pacific University | 73 | (27) |

Senior career*
| Years | Team | Apps | (Gls) |
| 2023 | New Mexico United U23 | | |
| 2023–2026 | New Mexico United | 29 | (0) |
- * Club domestic league appearances and goals as of October 23, 2026

Arturo Astorga (born March 29, 1998) is an American professional soccer player.

== Career ==
=== Youth ===
Astorga played soccer at Canutillo High School where he featured on the varsity squad for 4 years and captained the team during his senior year.

He played collegiality at Azusa Pacific University. As a junior he earned United Soccer Coaches NCAA DII All-America Second Team honors. He was named first team All-PacWest Conference honors during his junior and senior seasons.

=== Professional career ===
Astorga signed his first professional contract with New Mexico United on September 20, 2023 and made his debut in the starting lineup that same day against Sacramento Republic FC.

== Career statistics ==
Appearances and goals by club, season and competition
| Club | Season | League | | | National cup | | Continental | | Total | |
| Club | Season | Division | Apps | Goals | Apps | Goals | Apps | Goals | Apps | Goals |
|---|---|---|---|---|---|---|---|---|---|---|
| New Mexico United U23 | 2023 | USL League Two | 0 | 0 | — | | — | | 0 | 0 |
| New Mexico United | 2023 | USL Championship | 6 | 0 | — | | — | | 6 | 0 |
| New Mexico United | 2024 | USL Championship | 22 | 0 | 2 | 0 | — | | 24 | 0 |
| Total | | | 28 | 0 | 2 | 0 | 0 | 0 | 30 | 0 |
| Career total | | | 28 | 0 | 2 | 0 | 0 | 0 | 30 | 0 |

As of 28 October 2024
