= Kalen Ryden =

American soccer player (born 1991)

Personal information
- Date of birth: April 12, 1991 (age 35)
- Place of birth: Norman, Oklahoma, United States
- Height: 1.88 m (6 ft 2 in)
- Position: Defender

Youth career
- 2009–2010: Oral Roberts Golden Eagles
- 2012–2014: Midwestern State Mustangs

Senior career*
Years	Team	Apps	(Gls)
2010	Des Moines Menace	11	(0)
2013	Midland/Odessa Sockers	2	(0)
2014	Austin Aztex	14	(3)
2015	Columbus Crew SC	0	(0)
2015	→ Austin Aztex (loan)	9	(1)
2015–2016	Oklahoma City Energy	26	(1)
2017	Jacksonville Armada	31	(1)
2018–2019	Real Monarchs	62	(8)
2020–2025	New Mexico United	139	(4)
- * Club domestic league appearances and goals as of October 30, 2025

Kalen Ryden (born April 12, 1991) is a former professional soccer player who spent much of his professional career with New Mexico United in the USL Championship.

== Career ==
=== College and amateur ===
Ryden began his college career at Oral Roberts University where he played from 2009 to 2010. In his two seasons with the Golden Eagles, he made 35 appearances and tallied three goals and two assists. After the 2010 season, he left the Golden Eagles soccer program due to injury. However, he remained a student at Oral Roberts during the school year.

In 2012, Ryden transferred to Midwestern State University and redshirted his first season there due to transfer rules. During his time with the Mustangs, he made 28 appearances and tallied one goal and two assists.

Ryden also played in the Premier Development League for Des Moines Menace, Midland-Odessa Sockers and Austin Aztex.

=== Club career ===
On January 20, 2015, Ryden was selected in the fourth round (69th overall) of the 2015 MLS SuperDraft by Columbus Crew SC. He signed a professional contract with the club on March 2.

On March 26, Ryden re-joined the Aztex, who moved up to the USL. Columbus sent him on loan to the club as part of the affiliation agreement. He made his professional debut three days later in a 2–0 victory over Colorado Springs Switchbacks FC.

On August 6, Ryden was waived by Crew SC.

Ryden signed with USL side Oklahoma City Energy on August 27, 2015.

On January 20, 2017, Ryden signed with NASL side Jacksonville Armada.

=== New Mexico United ===
After two seasons in the USL Championship with Real Monarchs, Ryden moved to USL side New Mexico United ahead of their 2020 season.

Ryden was named New Mexico United's Defensive Player of the Year following the 2020 season.

In October of 2025, Ryden announced he would retire at the end of the 2025 USL Championship season. A mainstay in New Mexico back-line since his arrival in 2020, Ryden appeared in 153 matches for the club across all competitions.

== Career statistics ==
As of match played July 30, 2024

Club	Season	League			Domestic Cup		League Cup		Total	
Club	Season	Division	Apps	Goals	Apps	Goals	Apps	Goals	Apps	Goals
Des Moines Menace	2010	USL PDL	11	0	1	0	—		11	0
Midland-Odessa Sockers	2013	USL PDL	2	0	—		—		2	0
Austin Aztex	2014	USL PDL	14	3	0	0	0	0	14	3
Columbus Crew SC	2015	MLS	0	0	0	0	0	0	0	0
Austin Aztex (loan)	2015	USL	9	1	0	0	—		9	1
OKC Energy	2015	USL	8	0	0	0	2 (Note: Appearance(s) in the USL Cup Playoffs)	0	10	0
OKC Energy	2016	USL	25	1	2 (Note: Appearance(s) in the US Open Cup)	0	2	0	29	1
OKC Energy	Total		37	1	2	0	4	0	43	1
Jacksonville Armada	2017	NASL	31	1	1	0	—		32	1
Real Monarchs	2018	USL	34	5	—		1	0	35	5
Real Monarchs	2019	USL Championship	28	3	—		4 (Note: Appearance(s) in USL Championship playoffs)	1	32	4
Real Monarchs	Total		62	8	0	0	5	1	67	9
New Mexico United	2020	USL Championship	15	1	—		2	0	17	1
New Mexico United	2021	USL Championship	29	1	—		—		29	1
New Mexico United	2022	USL Championship	28	0	0	0	1	0	29	0
New Mexico United	2023	USL Championship	33	1	2	0	1	0	36	1
New Mexico United	2024	USL Championship	4	0	0	0	—		4	0
New Mexico United	Total		113	3	2	0	4	0	119	3
Career total			270	17	6	0	11	1	287	18

== Honors ==
Real Monarchs

- USL Championship Champions: 2019
