= Talen Maples =

American soccer player (born 1998)

Personal information
- Full name: Jon-Talen Maples
- Date of birth: November 20, 1998 (age 27)
- Place of birth: Leander, Texas, United States
- Height: 1.83 m (6 ft 0 in)
- Position: Centre-back

Team information
- Current team: Colorado Springs Switchbacks
- Number: 24

Youth career
- Georgetown Force
- Lonestar SC

College career
Years	Team	Apps	(Gls)
2017–2019	SMU Mustangs	49	(4)

Senior career*
Years	Team	Apps	(Gls)
2018–2019	Brazos Valley Cavalry	19	(0)
2021	Toronto FC II	19	(1)
2022–2023	Houston Dynamo 2	49	(7)
2024–2025	New Mexico United	62	(10)
2026–	Colorado Springs Switchbacks	29	(1)
- * Club domestic league appearances and goals as of November 7, 2026

Jon-Talen Maples (born November 20, 1998) is an American professional soccer player who plays as a defender for Colorado Springs Switchbacks in USL Championship.

== College ==
In 2017, he attended Southern Methodist University, playing for the Mustangs soccer team. He scored his first goal on September 15 against Loyola. In his freshman season, he was named to the American Athletic Conference All-Rookie Team. In 2018, he was named an AAC First Team All-Conference and Third Team All Region, and to the AAC All-Academic Team in 2018 and 2019. He missed most of the 2019 season due to a torn ACL and meniscus injury as well as the 2020 season, which was cancelled due to the COVID-19 pandemic.

== Club career ==
In 2018, he played for Premier Development League club Brazos Valley Cavalry.

He was drafted 72nd overall by Toronto FC in the 2021 MLS SuperDraft. He signed with their second team, Toronto FC II of USL League One, on May 5, 2021. He made his debut for Toronto FC II on May 22, 2021, against North Texas SC. He scored his first goal on October 1 against North Carolina FC. He attended the first team's 2022 training camp.

In February 2022, he signed with MLS Next Pro club Houston Dynamo 2. Serving as team captain, he helped Dynamo 2 to record ten clean sheets and finish the season tied for the fewest goals conceded in the league and was named to the MLS Next Pro Best XI at the end of the season.

In February 2024, Maples signed with New Mexico United in the USL Championship. Following the 2024 season, Maples was named New Mexico United team MVP and Newcomer of the Year.

In January 2026, Maples joined Colorado Springs Switchbacks FC on a transfer and signed a multi-year contract through the 2028 season.

== Career statistics ==
As of June 16th, 2025

Club	Season	League			Playoffs		Domestic cup		Other		Total	
Club	Season	Division	Apps	Goals	Apps	Goals	Apps	Goals	Apps	Goals	Apps	Goals
Brazos Valley Cavalry	2018	Premier Development League	10	0	0	0	—		—		10	0
Brazos Valley Cavalry	2019	USL League Two	9	0	0	0	0	0	—		9	0
Brazos Valley Cavalry	Total		19	0	0	0	0	0	0	0	19	0
Toronto FC II	2021	USL League One	19	1	—		—		—		19	1
Houston Dynamo 2	2022	MLS Next Pro	22	3	0	0	—		—		22	3
Houston Dynamo 2	2023	MLS Next Pro	26	4	1	0	2	0	—		29	4
Houston Dynamo 2	Total		48	7	1	0	2	0	0	0	51	7
New Mexico United	2024	USL Championship	33	3	2	0	3	1	—		38	4
New Mexico United	2025	USL Championship	12	2	—		1	0	2	1	15	3
Career total			131	12	3	0	6	1	2	1	142	14

== Honors ==
Individual

- MLS Next Pro Best XI: 2022
