= Anthony Herbert (footballer) =

Trinidadian footballer (born 1998)

Personal information
- Date of birth: 18 April 1998 (age 28)
- Place of birth: Brooklyn, New York City, United States
- Height: 1.93 m (6 ft 4 in)
- Position: Defender

Team information
- Current team: Indy Eleven
- Number: 4

Youth career
- New York Red Bulls

College career
| Years | Team | Apps | (Gls) |
| 2018–2019 | Fairleigh Dickinson Knights | 38 | (1) |
| 2020–2021 | St. John's Red Storm | 19 | (1) |

Senior career*
| Years | Team | Apps | (Gls) |
| 2022–2023 | Haka | 18 | (0) |
| 2024–2025 | New Mexico United | 27 | (0) |
| 2025 | Las Vegas Lights | 10 | (1) |
| 2026– | Indy Eleven | 21 | (1) |

International career^{‡}
| 2013 | Trinidad and Tobago U15 | | |
- Trinidad and Tobago U17
| 2016 | Trinidad and Tobago U18 | 2 | (0) |
- Trinidad and Tobago U20
| 2022– | Trinidad and Tobago | 1 | (0) |
- * Club domestic league appearances and goals as of 6 November 2026 ‡ National team caps and goals as of 28 December 2022

Anthony Herbert (born 18 April 1998) is a professional footballer currently playing as a defender for USL Championship club Indy Eleven. Born in the United States, he plays for the Trinidad and Tobago national team.

== Club career ==
In February 2022, it was announced that Herbert had signed a professional contract with Finnish side Haka. He signed a contract extension in November of the same year.

Herbert returned to the United States in February 2024, signing with USL Championship side New Mexico United on February 21, 2024.

On July 25, 2025, Herbet was transferred to Las Vegas Lights.

In January 2026, Indy Eleven announced they had signed Herbert to a contract for the 2026 season.

== International career ==
In September 2022, Herbert received his first call up to the Trinidad and Tobago national football team.

== Career statistics ==
=== Club ===
As of match played 16 June 2025

Appearances and goals by club, season and competition
| Club | Season | League | | | National Cup (Note: Includes Finnish Cup and US Open Cup) | | League Cup (Note: Includes Finnish League Cup and USL Cup) | | Continental | | Total | |
| Club | Season | Division | Apps | Goals | Apps | Goals | Apps | Goals | Apps | Goals | Apps | Goals |
|---|---|---|---|---|---|---|---|---|---|---|---|---|
| Haka | 2022 | Veikkausliiga | 10 | 0 | 3 | 0 | 4 | 0 | – | | 17 | 0 |
| Haka | 2023 | Veikkausliiga | 8 | 0 | 1 | 0 | 4 | 0 | 2 (Note: Appearances in the UEFA Europa Conference League) | 0 | 15 | 0 |
| Haka | Total | | 18 | 0 | 4 | 0 | 8 | 0 | 2 | 0 | 32 | 0 |
| New Mexico United | 2024 | USL Championship | 23 | 0 | 4 | 1 | 0 | 0 | – | | 27 | 1 |
| New Mexico United | 2025 | USL Championship | 5 | 0 | 1 | 0 | 1 | 0 | – | | 7 | 0 |
| Career total | | | 46 | 0 | 9 | 1 | 9 | 0 | 2 | 0 | 66 | 1 |

=== International ===
As of matches played 28 December 2022.

Appearances and goals by national team and year
| National team | Year | Apps | Goals |
|---|---|---|---|
| Trinidad and Tobago | 2022 | 1 | 0 |
| Total | | 1 | 0 |
