= Mukwelle Akale =

American soccer player (born 1997)

Personal information
- Full name: Mukwelle Madzey Akale
- Date of birth: January 18, 1997 (age 29)
- Place of birth: Minneapolis, Minnesota, United States
- Height: 1.62 m (5 ft 4 in)
- Position: Winger

Team information
- Current team: Louisville City
- Number: 47

Youth career
- –2014: Minnesota Thunder
- 2014–2016: Villarreal

Senior career*
Years	Team	Apps	(Gls)
2016–2018	Villarreal C	60	(8)
2018–2020	Villarreal B	38	(4)
2020–2021	Pafos	6	(0)
2022–2023	South Georgia Tormenta	43	(12)
2024–2025	New Mexico United	59	(7)
2026–	Louisville City	22	(4)

International career
2012–2013	United States U17	9	(2)
2013–2014	United States U18	7	(0)
2015–2016	United States U20	5	(3)
- * Club domestic league appearances and goals as of October 31, 2026

Mukwelle Madzey Akale (born January 18, 1997) is an American professional soccer player who plays as a winger for Louisville City FC in USL Championship.

== Club career ==
Akale joined the academy of Spanish side Villarreal after impressing playing for United States U18s in a youth tournament in the Canary Islands. In August 2020, Akale, alongside his younger brother, moved to Cypriot First Division side Pafos. On September 12, 2020, he made his professional debut for Pafos, as a half-time substitute in a 2–1 loss to Apollon Limassol.

Akale joined USL League One club South Georgia Tormenta on August 25, 2022.

On January 3, 2024, New Mexico United announced they signed Akale for the 2024 USL Championship season.

On December 12, 2025, Louisville City FC announced they signed Akale through the 2027 USL Championship season.

== International career ==
Akale was born in the United States, and is of Cameroonian descent through his father. Akale has represented the United States at under-17, under-18 and under-20 level.
