= Dayonn Harris =

Antigua and Barbuda footballer

Personal information
- Date of birth: 29 August 1997 (age 29)
- Place of birth: Milton, Ontario, Canada
- Height: 1.68 m (5 ft 6 in)
- Position: Winger

Team information
- Current team: New Mexico United
- Number: 5

Youth career
- Brampton East SC
- Woodbridge Strikers
- Vaughan Azzurri

College career
Years	Team	Apps	(Gls)
2015–2016	Penn State Nittany Lions	24	(4)
2017–2019	UConn Huskies	39	(7)

Senior career*
Years	Team	Apps	(Gls)
2014–2019	Vaughan Azzurri	8	(3)
2020	Real Monarchs	14	(0)
2021–2023	Tampa Bay Rowdies	71	(6)
2024–	New Mexico United	58	(7)

International career^{‡}
2024–	Antigua and Barbuda	1	(0)
- * Club domestic league appearances and goals as of 09:59, 10 November 2026 (UTC) ‡ National team caps and goals as of 5 June 2024

Dayonn Harris (born 29 August 1997) is a footballer who plays as a winger for USL Championship club New Mexico United. Born in Canada, he represents Antigua and Barbuda internationally.

== Early life ==
Harris began playing soccer with Brampton East SC when he was seven years old. He later played youth soccer with Woodbridge Strikers and Vaughan Azzurri. In 2014, he began playing with Vaughan's League1 Ontario team, playing through 2019.

== Club career ==
=== Real Monarchs ===
Harris was selected by Real Salt Lake with the 20th pick in the 2020 MLS SuperDraft, before signing with their USL Championship affiliate Real Monarchs the following month. He made his league debut for the club on 11 July 2020, in a home match against the San Diego Loyal. His option was declined by Real Monarchs following the 2020 season.

=== Tampa Bay Rowdies ===
On 31 December 2020, Harris joined USL Championship side Tampa Bay Rowdies on a two-year deal. Harris made his debut for the Rowdies on 1 May 2021, during a 3–0 victory over Charlotte Independence.

=== New Mexico United ===
On 5 January 2024, it was announced that Harris had signed with New Mexico United for the 2024 USL Championship season.

Following the 2025 USL Championship season, Harris was named the league's 2025 Combeback Player of the Year after returning from an ACL injury that sidelined him for a 12 months.

== International career ==
Harris was born in Canada to a father of Trinidadian and Antiguan descent, and mother of Jamaican descent. He made his debut for the Antigua and Barbuda national team on 5 June 2024 in a World Cup qualifier against Bermuda at the ABFA Technical Center. He substituted Raheem Deterville in the 67th minute, the game ended in a 1–1 draw.

== Career statistics ==
As of match played on 25 May 2026

Club	Season	League			Playoffs		Domestic Cup		League Cup		Total	
Club	Season	Division	Apps	Goals	Apps	Goals	Apps	Goals	Apps	Goals	Apps	Goals
Vaughan Azzurri	2016	League1 Ontario	2	2	—		—		1	0	3	2
Vaughan Azzurri	2017	League1 Ontario	2	0	—		—		0	0	2	0
Vaughan Azzurri	2018	League1 Ontario	2	1	0	0	—		1	1	3	2
Vaughan Azzurri	2019	League1 Ontario	2	0	0	0	2	0	—		4	0
Vaughan Azzurri	Total		8	3	0	0	2	0	2	1	12	4
Real Monarchs	2020	USL Championship	14	0	—		—		—		14	0
Tampa Bay Rowdies	2021	USL Championship	17	0	3	0	—		—		20	0
Tampa Bay Rowdies	2022	USL Championship	26	5	3	0	2	0	—		31	5
Tampa Bay Rowdies	2023	USL Championship	28	1	0	0	2	0	—		30	1
Tampa Bay Rowdies	Total		71	6	6	0	4	0	0	0	79	6
New Mexico United	2024	USL Championship	15	1	0	0	2	0	—		17	1
New Mexico United	2025	USL Championship	15	1	3	1	—		1	1	19	3
New Mexico United	2026	USL Championship	8	1	—		1	0	2	1	11	2
Career total			131	12	9	1	9	0	5	3	154	16
