= Chris Gloster =

American soccer player (born 2000)

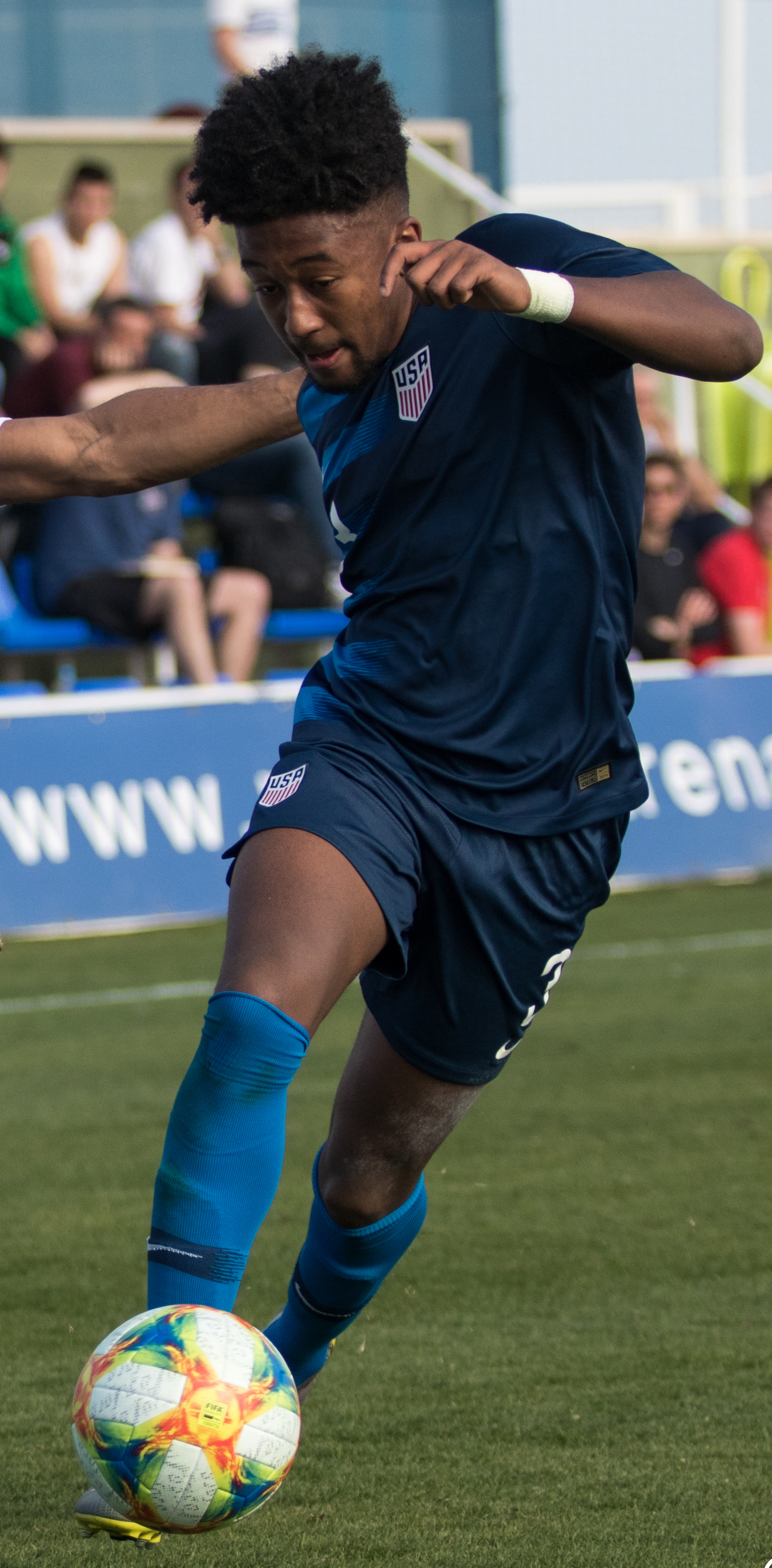
- Gloster with the United States U20 in 2019

Personal information
- Full name: Christopher Gloster
- Date of birth: July 28, 2000 (age 26)
- Place of birth: Montclair, New Jersey, United States
- Height: 6 ft 0 in (1.83 m)
- Position: Left-back

Team information
- Current team: New Mexico United
- Number: 3

Youth career
- 2007–2011: Montclair United
- 2011–2012: New Egypt Bohemians
- 2011–2013: FC Jersey Galacticos
- 2013–2017: New York Red Bulls

Senior career*
Years	Team	Apps	(Gls)
2016	New York Red Bulls II	1	(0)
2018–2019	Hannover 96 II	16	(0)
2019–2021	Jong PSV	22	(0)
2021–2022	New York City FC	15	(1)
2021	→ Sacramento Republic (loan)	2	(0)
2022	New York City FC II	5	(1)
2023	Atlanta United 2	7	(0)
2024–	New Mexico United	85	(2)

International career
2016–2017	United States U17	39	(1)
2018	United States U19	3	(0)
2018–2019	United States U20	17	(0)
2019	United States U23	2	(0)
- * Club domestic league appearances and goals as of October 30, 2026

Christopher Gloster (born July 28, 2000) is an American professional soccer player who plays as a left-back for USL Championship club New Mexico United.

== Club career ==
Gloster grew up in Montclair, New Jersey, where he attended Montclair High School. He made his debut for Red Bull II against Orlando City B on August 13, 2016, in the 2016 USL season. His appearance as a starter against Orlando City B made him the youngest American to start in a USL game at 16 years and 16 days.

In March 2018, Gloster signed for German club Hannover after having trials at clubs in Germany.

In April 2017, he was named in the United States team for the 2017 CONCACAF U-17 Championship. He played for the United States at the 2017 FIFA U-17 World Cup in India.

On August 9, 2019, Gloster joined Dutch side Jong PSV, the reserve team of PSV Eindhoven, on a three-year deal.

=== New York City FC ===
On March 22, 2021, Gloster joined Major League Soccer club New York City FC, with his homegrown player rights being acquired from former club New York Red Bulls.

On May 31, 2021, Gloster was loaned to USL Championship side Sacramento Republic.

On February 17, 2023, NYCFC opted to buyout Gloster's contract with the club.

=== New Mexico United ===
Gloster joined USL Championship club New Mexico United on January 16, 2024.

== Career statistics ==
=== Club ===
As of 25 August 2024

Club	League	Season	League		National cup		League cup		Continental		Total	
Club	League	Season	Apps	Goals	Apps	Goals	Apps	Goals	Apps	Goals	Apps	Goals
New York Red Bulls II	United Soccer League	2016	1	0	–		–		–		1	0
Hannover 96 II	Regionalliga Nord	2018–19	16	0	–		–		–		16	0
Jong PSV	Eerste Divisie	2019–20	16	0	–		–		–		16	0
Jong PSV	Eerste Divisie	2020–21	6	0	–		–		–		6	0
Jong PSV	Total		22	0	–		–		–		22	0
New York City FC	MLS	2021	4	0	–		–		1 (Note: Appearance(s) in Leagues Cup)	0	5	0
New York City FC	MLS	2022	11	1	2	0	–		2 (Note: Appearance(s) in CONCACAF Champions League)	0	15	1
New York City FC	Total		15	1	2	0	–		3	0	20	1
Sacramento Republic FC	USL Championship	2021	2	0	–		–		–		2	0
New York City FC II	MLS Next Pro	2022	5	1	–		–		–		5	1
Atlanta United II	MLS Next Pro	2023	7	0	–		–		–		7	0
New Mexico United	USL Championship	2024	29	0	3	0	–		–		32	0
New Mexico United	USL Championship	2025	8	1	–		1	0	–		9	1
Career total			105	3	5	0	1	0	3	0	114	3

== Honors ==
New York City FC

- MLS Cup: 2021

United States U20

- CONCACAF U-20 Championship: 2018

Individual

- CONCACAF Under-20 Championship Best XI: 2018
