= Luther Archimède =

Guadeloupean footballer (born 1999)

Personal information
- Full name: Luther Archimède
- Date of birth: 17 September 1999 (age 27)
- Place of birth: Les Abymes, Guadeloupe, France
- Height: 1.90 m (6 ft 3 in)
- Position: Forward

Team information
- Current team: New Mexico United
- Number: 29

Youth career
- Istres
- 2016–2019: Sochaux

College career
Years	Team	Apps	(Gls)
2019–2020	Syracuse Orange	21	(4)

Senior career*
Years	Team	Apps	(Gls)
2017–2019	Sochaux II	25	(5)
2019	Sochaux	0	(0)
2021	New York Red Bulls II	14	(3)
2022–2023	Sacramento Republic	55	(11)
2024–2025	Monterey Bay FC	12	(0)
2025–	New Mexico United	32	(4)

International career^{‡}
2018	Guadeloupe U20	5	(6)
2019–	Guadeloupe	12	(1)
- * Club domestic league appearances and goals as of 31 October 2026 ‡ National team caps and goals as of 19 July 2023

Luther Archimède (born 17 September 1999) is a Guadeloupean professional footballer who plays as a forward for New Mexico United in the USL Championship and for the Guadeloupe national team.

== Career ==
=== Early career ===
Born in Les Abymes, Guadeloupe, Archimède moved to France and began his career with the youth setup of Istres. In 2016 he joined the academy of Sochaux. He remained with Sochaux for three years before going to the United States to play college soccer for the Syracuse Orange.

=== Sochaux ===
Archimède joined the Sochaux academy in 2016, coming from Istres. He made his senior debut with Sochaux in a 1-0 Coupe de France loss to Lille OSC on 7 January 2019.

=== New York Red Bulls ===
Archimède was selected 13th overall by New York Red Bulls in the 2021 MLS SuperDraft. On 19 April 2021, Archimède signed with New York Red Bulls II.

=== Sacramento Republic ===
On 15 December 2021, Archimède signed with USL Championship side Sacramento Republic ahead of their 2022 season. He left Sacramento following their 2023 season.

=== Monterey Bay FC ===
Archimède joined rival California USL Championship club Monterey Bay FC on 12 December 2023.

=== New Mexico United ===
On August 20th, 2025, New Mexico United announced they had acquired Archimède via transfer from Monterey Bay FC. He registered his first goal for New Mexico during a September 7, 2025 match against San Antonio FC.

He resigned with New Mexico United for the 2026 USL Championship season on January 12, 2026.

== International career ==
Archimède represented the Guadeloupe U20s at the 2018 CONCACAF U-20 Championship and finished as the third top scorer, with 6 goals in 5 games. He made his senior debut for the Guadeloupe football team in a 1-0 loss to Martinique for 2019–20 CONCACAF Nations League qualifying on 23 March 2019. In 2021, Achimède represented the Guadeloupe football team in the Gold Cup, where he made two appearances, the first as a substitute and the second as a starter.
