= New Mexico United U23 =

- Founded: January 23, 2020; 5 years ago
- Stadium: various
- Owner: Peter Trevisani
- Manager: Luke Sanford
- League: USL League Two
- 2024: 4th, Mountain Division; Playoffs: DNQ
Home colors	Away colors

New Mexico United U23 is a development soccer team under the parent club New Mexico United based in Albuquerque, New Mexico. The team will compete in the Mountain Division of the Western Conference of USL League Two, the fourth tier of the American soccer pyramid.

== History ==
On January 23, 2020, New Mexico United announced the creation of a reserve team which would have begun play in the 2020 season. However, the USL League Two season was cancelled on April 30, 2020, due to the COVID-19 pandemic. The U23 team will bridge the gap between the High Performance Youth Program and the first team.

On April 16, 2022, New Mexico United U-23 announced their participation in the 2022 USL League Two season with Luke Sanford, the director of the youth academy, as head manager. Home matches are to be held throughout the state in the cities of Albuquerque, Roswell, Santa Fe, Taos, Gallup, and Farmington. The club has announced plans to play in more New Mexico cities in future seasons.

=== Sponsorship ===
Season	Kit manufacturer	Shirt sponsor
2022	Puma	NM811

== Players and staff ==
=== Current roster ===
As of May 25, 2022

Note: Flags indicate national team as defined under FIFA eligibility rules. Players may hold more than one non-FIFA nationality.

No.	Pos.	Nation	Player
?	GK	USA	Anthony Munoz
?	GK	USA	Nate Slota
?	GK	USA	Evan Kowalski
?	DF	USA	Stephen Romero
?	DF	USA	Paolo Vela
?	DF	USA	Mikah Madrid
?	DF	USA	Larsen Rogers
?	DF	USA	Lamar Bynum
?	DF	USA	Nick Williams
?	MF	USA	Gabe Legendre
?	MF	USA	Marcus Garcia
?	MF	USA	Josh Baros
?	MF	USA	Dane Gallegos
?	MF	USA	Andres Robles
?	MF	USA	Johnny Baros
?	MF	USA	Taylor Rogers
?	MF	JPN	Yutaro Tsukada
?	FW	USA	Josiah Henderson
?	FW	USA	Isai Rivas
?	FW	USA	Aaron Cisneros
?	FW	USA	Nick Legendre

=== Technical staff ===
Title	Name
Head Coach and Academy Director	Luke Sanford

Last updated: May 18, 2022
Source: New Mexico United

== Year-by-year ==
Year	Division	League	Regular season	Playoffs	Open Cup
2020	4	USL League Two	Season canceled due to COVID-19 pandemic		
2021	Did not play				
2022	4	USL League Two	3rd, Mountain	Did not qualify	Did not qualify
2023	4	USL League Two	2nd, Mountain	Conference Quarterfinals	Did not qualify
2024	4	USL League Two	4th, Mountain	Did not qualify	Did not qualify
