= Ousman Jabang =

American soccer player (born 2001)

Personal information
- Full name: Ousman Saikou Jabang
- Date of birth: March 24, 2001 (age 25)
- Place of birth: McDonough, Georgia, United States
- Height: 6 ft 2 in (1.88 m)
- Positions: Defender; midfielder

Team information
- Current team: New Mexico United
- Number: 15

Youth career
- Gwinnett SA
- Atlanta United

College career
Years	Team	Apps	(Gls)
2019–2022	Mercer Bears	65	(9)

Senior career*
Years	Team	Apps	(Gls)
2021	Georgia Revolution	2	(1)
2023–2025	CF Montréal	5	(0)
2023	→ CF Montréal U23 (loan)	4	(0)
2024	→ Las Vegas Lights (loan)	14	(0)
2025–	New Mexico United	55	(4)
- * Club domestic league appearances and goals as of 10:02, 10 November 2026 (UTC)

Ousman Saikou Jabang (born March 24, 2001) is an American professional soccer player who plays for New Mexico United in the USL Championship.

== Early life ==
Jabang played youth soccer with Gwinnett SA, with whom he won three state championships, two regional championships and had a third-place finish at the national championships. He later joined the Atlanta United youth academy and also played with the Georgia ODP program for four years.

== College career ==
He committed to attend Mercer University to play for the men's soccer team beginning in the Fall of 2019. He scored his first collegiate goal in the season opener on August 30, 2019, in a 2–0 victory over the Cincinnati Bearcats. Ahead of his junior season in 2021, he was named to the Preseason All-SoCon Men's Soccer Team. That season, he helped Mercer win the Southern Conference Tournament title and at the end of the season, he was named to the All-Southern Conference First Team and the All-South Region Third Team. In 2022, he was named to the All-Southern Conference Second Team, as well as the Southern Conference All-Tournament Team.

== Club career ==
In 2021, he played with Georgia Revolution FC in the National Premier Soccer League.

At the 2023 MLS SuperDraft, Jabang was selected in the third round (75th overall) by CF Montréal. In March 2023, Jabang signed a one-year contract, with an additional three option years with the club. He began the season with the CF Montréal U23 team in Ligue1 Québec, playing in the first match of the season on May 7 against CS St-Hubert. In July 2024, he was loaned to the Las Vegas Lights of the USL Championship for the remainder of the 2024 season.

On March 19, 2025, Jabang was sold to USL Championship side New Mexico United for an undisclosed fee.

== Career statistics ==
As of May 25, 2026

Appearances and goals by club, season and competition
Club	Season	League			Playoffs		National cup		Other		Total	
Club	Season	Division	Apps	Goals	Apps	Goals	Apps	Goals	Apps	Goals	Apps	Goals
Georgia Revolution FC	2021	National Premier Soccer League	2	1	2	1	—		—		4	2
CF Montréal	2023	Major League Soccer	3	0	—		0	0	0	0	3	0
CF Montréal U23 (loan)	2023	Ligue1 Québec	4	0	—		—		0	0	4	0
CF Montréal	2024	Major League Soccer	1	0	—		1	0			2	0
Las Legas Lights FC	2024	USL Championship	14	0	3	0	—				17	0
CF Montréal	2025	Major League Soccer	1	0	—		—				1	0
New Mexico United	2025	USL Championship	25	2	2	0	1	0	4	0	32	2
New Mexico United	2026	USL Championship	9	2	—		1	0	2	0	12	2
Career total			59	5	7	1	3	0	6	0	75	6
