= Zico Bailey =

Filipino footballer (born 2000)

Personal information
- Full name: Zico Alika Lefroy Locquiao Bailey
- Date of birth: August 27, 2000 (age 26)
- Place of birth: Henderson, Nevada, United States
- Height: 1.70 m (5 ft 7 in)
- Positions: Defensive midfielder; right-back

Team information
- Current team: New Mexico United
- Number: 19

Youth career
- –2014: Heat FC
- 2014–2018: LA Galaxy
- 2019: Kalmar FF

College career
Years	Team	Apps	(Gls)
2018	Cal State Fullerton Titans	21	(1)

Senior career*
Years	Team	Apps	(Gls)
2017	LA Galaxy II	5	(0)
2019–2020	Helsingør	0	(0)
2020–2022	FC Cincinnati	19	(1)
2022	FC Cincinnati 2	17	(0)
2023	San Antonio	11	(1)
2023–	New Mexico United	88	(5)

International career^{‡}
2015	United States U15	5	(0)
2024–	Philippines	14	(1)
- * Club domestic league appearances and goals as of 10:16, 10 November 2026 (UTC) ‡ National team caps and goals as of May 24, 2026

Zico Alika Lefroy Locquiao Bailey (born August 27, 2000) is a professional footballer who plays as a defensive midfielder or a right-back for USL Championship club New Mexico United. Born in the United States, he represents the Philippines national team.

== Personal life ==
Zico is the younger brother of Kainoa Bailey.

== College career ==
Bailey joined the Cal State Fullerton Titans men's soccer ahead of the 2018 NCAA Division I men's soccer season. During his freshman year, Bailey played in 21 matches for the Titans, starting 17 matches.

== Club career ==
Bailey made his professional debut in a 1–1 draw with Orange County SC. He replaced Jorge Hernandez after 82 minutes.

After a successful season with Cal State Fullerton, Bailey signed with Allsvenskan side Kalmar FF in April 2019. Three months later, on July 16, it was announced that he had moved to Danish 2nd Division club FC Helsingør.

On December 12, 2019, Bailey moved to Major League Soccer (MLS) side FC Cincinnati ahead of their 2020 season. Cincinnati acquired the defender's Homegrown rights from LA Galaxy in exchange for FC Cincinnati's natural 4th-round 2020 MLS SuperDraft pick. Bailey made his MLS debut with FC Cincinnati on October 7, 2020, replacing an injured Greg Garza in the 30th minute.

Bailey was released by Cincinnati following their 2022 season.

On March 16, 2023, Bailey signed a short-term deal with USL Championship side San Antonio FC.

Bailey signed with New Mexico United of USL Championship on August 22, 2023. Following the 2025 season, Bailey's 63 yard strike versus Detroit City FC was named the 2025 USL Championship Goal of the Year.

== International career ==
Born in United States to a Jamaican father and a Filipina mother, Bailey is eligible to represent Jamaica, United States and Philippines at international level.

=== Philippines ===
In March 2024, Bailey was reportedly one of the players being recruited by head coach Tom Saintfiet and team manager Freddy Gonzalez to play for the Philippines.

In May 2024, Bailey was included in the Philippines 28-man squad for the 2026 FIFA World Cup qualifying matches against Vietnam and Indonesia. He made his debut against the former on 6 June 2024 at the Mỹ Đình National Stadium. He played the full game as Vietnam won 3–2.

Bailey scored his first international goal on 14 October 2024 against Tajikistan at the Tinsulanon Stadium during the 2024 King's Cup, which ended in a 3–0 victory.

== Career statistics ==
=== Club ===
As of match played May 24, 2025

Appearances and goals by club, season and competition
Club	Season	League			National cup		Continental		Total	
Club	Season	Division	Apps	Goals	Apps	Goals	Apps	Goals	Apps	Goals
LA Galaxy II	2017	United Soccer League	7	0	—		—		7	0
FC Cincinnati	2020	Major League Soccer	5	0	—		—		5	0
FC Cincinnati	2021	Major League Soccer	11	1	—		—		11	1
FC Cincinnati 2	2022	MLS Next Pro	17	0	—		—		17	0
FC Cincinnati	2022	Major League Soccer	3	0	2	0	—		5	0
San Antonio FC	2023	USL Championship	11	1	1	0	—		12	1
New Mexico United	2023	USL Championship	11	1	—		—		11	1
New Mexico United	2024	USL Championship	27	0	4	2	—		31	2
New Mexico United	2025	USL Championship	25	2	1	0	—		26	2
New Mexico United	2026	USL Championship	8	1	—		—		8	1
Career total			125	6	8	2	0	0	133	8

=== International ===
As of match played 24 May 2026

Scores and results list the Philippines' goal tally first, score column indicates score after each Bailey goal.

List of international goals scored by Zico Bailey
No.	Date	Venue	Opponent	Score	Result	Competition
1	14 October 2024	Tinsulanon Stadium, Songkhla, Thailand	Tajikistan	3–0	3–0	2024 King's Cup
