= Greg Hurst =

Scottish footballer (born 1997)

Personal information
- Date of birth: 8 April 1997 (age 29)
- Place of birth: Stirling, Scotland
- Height: 6 ft 1 in (1.85 m)
- Position: Striker

Team information
- Current team: New Mexico United
- Number: 10

Senior career*
Years	Team	Apps	(Gls)
2014–2015	Stirling Albion	2	(0)
2015–2019	St Johnstone	3	(0)
2016	→ Berwick Rangers (loan)	10	(4)
2017–2018	→ East Fife (loan)	18	(5)
2018	→ Forfar Athletic (loan)	13	(2)
2018	→ Berwick Rangers (loan)	8	(0)
2019	Stenhousemuir	14	(2)
2019–2020	Chattanooga Red Wolves	21	(10)
2021	Union Omaha	28	(13)
2022	Phoenix Rising	31	(6)
2023–	New Mexico United	117	(35)
- * Club domestic league appearances and goals as of 10:01, 10 November 2026 (UTC)

Greg Hurst (born 8 April 1997) is a Scottish professional footballer who plays as a striker for New Mexico United in the USL Championship.

Hurst has previously played for Stirling Albion, St Johnstone, Forfar Athletic, East Fife, Berwick Rangers, Stenhousemuir, Chattanooga Red Wolves, Union Omaha and Phoenix Rising FC.

== Career ==
Hurst is from Stirling.

Following a trial with Everton, Hurst signed for St Johnstone in September 2015. He moved on loan to East Fife in 2017, having played as a trialist against his parent club during a pre-season friendly. He was then loaned to Forfar Athletic in January 2018, and back to Berwick Rangers in September 2018.

Hurst left St Johnstone permanently in January 2019, signing for Stenhousemuir. He moved to American side Chattanooga Red Wolves in August 2019.

On 22 January 2021, Hurst moved to USL League One side Union Omaha. He led Omaha in scoring en route to winning the 2021 USL League One championship final.

Hurst moved to USL Championship club Phoenix Rising FC on 17 January 2022.

On 2 December 2022, Hurst was transferred to New Mexico United for the 2023 season, in exchange for an international roster spot.

== Career statistics ==
As of match played 4 November 2024

Appearances and goals by club, season and competition
Club	Season	League			National cup (Note: Includes Scottish Cup, U.S. Open Cup)		League cup (Note: Includes Scottish League Cup)		Other		Total	
Club	Season	Division	Apps	Goals	Apps	Goals	Apps	Goals	Apps	Goals	Apps	Goals
Stirling Albion	2014–15	Scottish League One	2	0	0	0	0	0	0	0	2	0
St Johnstone	2015–16	Scottish Premiership	2	0	0	0	0	0	0	0	2	0
St Johnstone	2016–17	Scottish Premiership	1	0	0	0	0	0	—		1	0
St Johnstone	2017–18	Scottish Premiership	0	0	0	0	0	0	0	0	0	0
St Johnstone	2018–19	Scottish Premiership	0	0	0	0	0	0	—		0	0
St Johnstone	Total		3	0	0	0	0	0	0	0	3	0
St Johnstone U20	2016–17	—			—		—		1 (Note: Appearance(s) in Scottish Challenge Cup)	1	1	1
Berwick Rangers (loan)	2016–17	Scottish League Two	10	4	0	0	0	0	0	0	10	4
East Fife (loan)	2017–18	Scottish League One	18	5	0	0	0	0	1	0	19	5
Forfar Athletic (loan)	2017–18	Scottish League One	13	2	0	0	0	0	0	0	13	2
Berwick Rangers (loan)	2018–19	Scottish League Two	8	0	2	0	0	0	0	0	10	0
Stenhousemuir	2018–19	Scottish League One	14	2	0	0	0	0	1 (Note: Appearance(s) in Scottish League One play-offs)	0	15	2
Chattanooga Red Wolves	2019	USL League One	9	2	0	0	—		—		9	2
Chattanooga Red Wolves	2020	USL League One	12	8	—		—		—		12	8
Chattanooga Red Wolves	Total		21	10	0	0	—		0	0	21	10
Union Omaha	2021	USL League One	28	13	—		—		2 (Note: Appearance(s) in USL League One Playoffs)	1	30	14
Phoenix Rising	2022	USL Championship	31	6	3	1	—		—		34	7
New Mexico United	2023	USL Championship	33	4	3	1	—		1 (Note: Appearance(s) in USL Championship playoffs)	0	37	5
New Mexico United	2024	USL Championship	33	12	3	1	—		1	0	37	13
New Mexico United	Total		66	16	6	2	—		2	0	74	18
Career total			214	58	11	3	0	0	7	2	232	63

== Honors ==
Individual

- USL League One All-League First Team: 2020, 2021
