= Isotopes Park =

Baseball stadium in Albuquerque, New Mexico, US

Rio Grande Credit Union Field at Isotopes Park
- The Lab

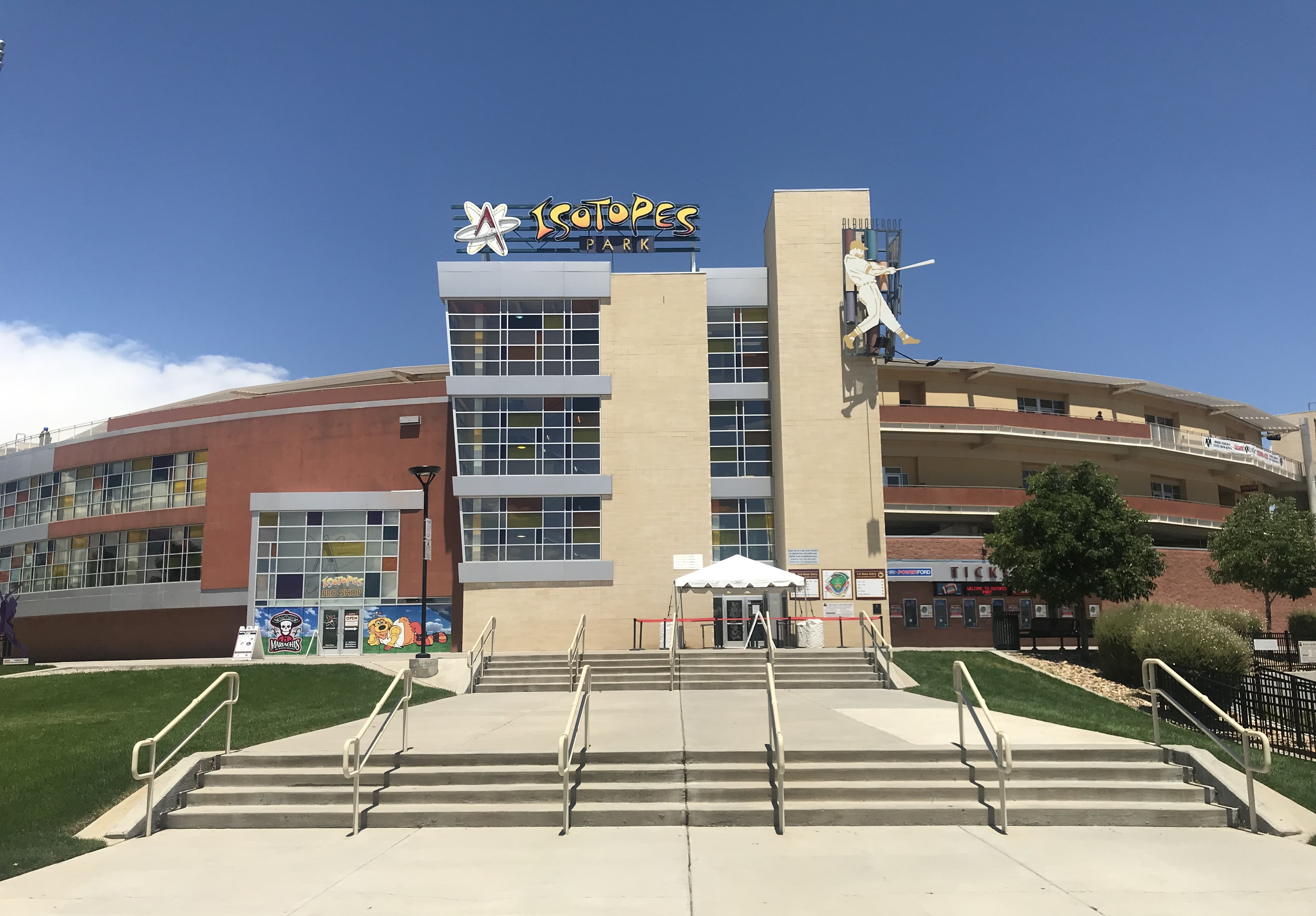

- Location within New Mexico Location within the United States
- Interactive map of Rio Grande Credit Union Field at Isotopes Park
- Former names: Albuquerque Sports Stadium (1969–2000); Isotopes Park (2003–2019)
- Address: 1601 Avenida Cesar Chavez SE; Albuquerque, New Mexico; United States
- Coordinates: 35°4′11″N 106°37′45″W
- Owner: City of Albuquerque
- Operator: Albuquerque Baseball Club, LLC.
- Capacity: 13,500 (11,124 fixed seats)
- Surface: Natural Grass
- Field size: Left field: 340 ft (103.6 m); Left-center field: 428 ft (130.5m); Center field: 400 ft (122.0 m); Right-center field: 428 ft (130.5 m); Right field: 340 ft (103.6 m)

Construction
- Groundbreaking: October 25, 2001
- Opened: April 11, 2003
- Cost: $25 million ($40.3 million in 2025 dollars)
- Architects: HOK Sport Venue; SMPC Architects
- Structural engineers: Chavez–Grieves Consulting Engineers, Inc.
- Services engineers: Coupland–Moran Engineers, Inc.
- General contractor: Bradbury Stamm Construction Inc.

Tenants
- Albuquerque Isotopes (PCL) 2003–present New Mexico Lobos (MWC) 2004–2013; New Mexico United (USLC) 2019–present

Rio Grande Credit Union Field at Isotopes Park is a minor league baseball stadium located in Albuquerque, New Mexico, and is the home field of the Albuquerque Isotopes of the Pacific Coast League, the Triple-A affiliate of the Colorado Rockies and New Mexico United, a professional soccer team in the USL Championship division that began play in 2019. The facility was also previously used by the University of New Mexico baseball program.

== History ==
In 2000, Bob Lozinak, then-owner of the Albuquerque Dukes, the Triple-A affiliate of the Los Angeles Dodgers, sold the team to a Portland, Oregon-based group, who moved the team to Portland as the Beavers. The Dukes had played in Albuquerque for almost 40 years. Their stadium, Albuquerque Sports Stadium, was the second oldest in the league and was in disrepair.

Finding another owner and team was not difficult. The Pacific Coast League had teams in Canada that they wanted to relocate. In 2001, a group headed by Tampa businessman Ken Young bought the Calgary Cannons intending to move it to Albuquerque, contingent on building a park. However, then-Mayor Jim Baca was unable to overcome opposition from a city council reluctant to spend city money on the project. Debate centered on whether to renovate the old Albuquerque Sports Stadium as a baseball-only park or build a brand new park downtown. Mayor Baca put the issue to a vote and the voters easily approved the $25 million needed to finance the project.

As it turned out, the renovation of Albuquerque Sports Stadium turned into construction of a completely new facility. Almost nothing of the old Albuquerque Sports Stadium remains, apart from the playing field. However, the new park retains its predecessor's general structure, as well as its dimensions and the system connecting the dugout to the clubhouse. The new stadium was also intended to retain the old facility's well-known "drive-in" terrace, where fans could sit in their cars and watch the game for free. However, Isotopes management scrapped those plans due to security concerns and instead converted it into a play area for children. Like its predecessor, it is known as a hitter's park, due to the high altitude and dry air, but changes in the field were made to create more of a windscreen which allows the ball-protected lift. The fences were also brought in slightly.

Isotopes Park was the home of the 2007 Triple-A All-Star Game, with the International League defeating the Pacific Coast League, 7–5. The game was viewed by 12,367 in attendance; the game was also broadcast on ESPN2 and on radio. Albuquerque's Valentino Pascucci was selected as the PCL MVP. Former Isotope Rob Stratton won the Home Run Derby.

On June 23, 2009, a single-game attendance record (since broken) was set when fans saw Manny Ramirez make a rehab start after serving a 50-game suspension for using performance-enhancing drugs. The Isotopes defeated the Nashville Sounds 1–0.

On September 20, 2011, Isotopes Park was host to the 2011 Triple-A National Championship Game between the champions of the Pacific Coast League and the International League. The game featured the Columbus Clippers defeating the Omaha Storm Chasers, 8–3, in front of 9,569 fans.

The Isotopes set a single-game attendance record in 2018 when 16,975 fans attended a game on Cinco de Mayo as part of minor league baseball's "Copa de la Diversión" promotion, in which the Isotopes played as the Mariachis de Nuevo México.

In 2020, the Isotopes entered into a corporate naming rights agreement with Rio Grande Credit Union to rebrand the facility as Rio Grande Credit Union Field at Isotopes Park.

=== University of New Mexico ===
In 2012, New Mexico ranked 38th among Division I baseball programs in attendance, averaging 1,618 per home game.

=== Soccer ===
New Mexico United, an expansion team playing in the USL Championship, began play at Isotopes Park on March 9, 2019. The inaugural match, which finished as a 1–1 draw against Fresno FC, was attended by 12,896 fans. The record attendance for a match is 15,247, set on August 17, 2019 against Los Angeles Galaxy II.

== Features ==
The stadium has a seating capacity of 13,279, with 11,154 fixed seats. There are 661 club seats and 30 suites at the ballpark. The field used to feature a hill in center field, similar to the one formerly in the Houston Astros' stadium, Minute Maid Park, but it was removed after the 2022 season, due to concerns for player safety.

The stadium has a large open breezeway above the primary seating area with a view of the playing field, which contains most of the park's services, such as restrooms, most of the food concessions, activities, and a souvenir store behind home plate. Behind the infield is the main structure of the stadium, which contains suites, offices, and the press box. An upper seating deck is attached to the structure, which overhangs the open breezeway. Beyond right field is a berm where fans can watch the game. Above the berm is a play area for children. Beyond left field is the scoreboard as well as a picnic shelter which can be reserved for groups.

The elevation of the playing field exceeds 5,100 feet (1,555 m) above sea level and warm summer air also give the balls great lift.

Statues of Homer, Marge, Lisa, and Bart Simpson of the animated sitcom The Simpsons are located on the concourse. The 2001 episode "Hungry, Hungry Homer", in which the fictional Springfield Isotopes attempted a move to Albuquerque, was the inspiration for the real-life team's name.

== Gallery ==
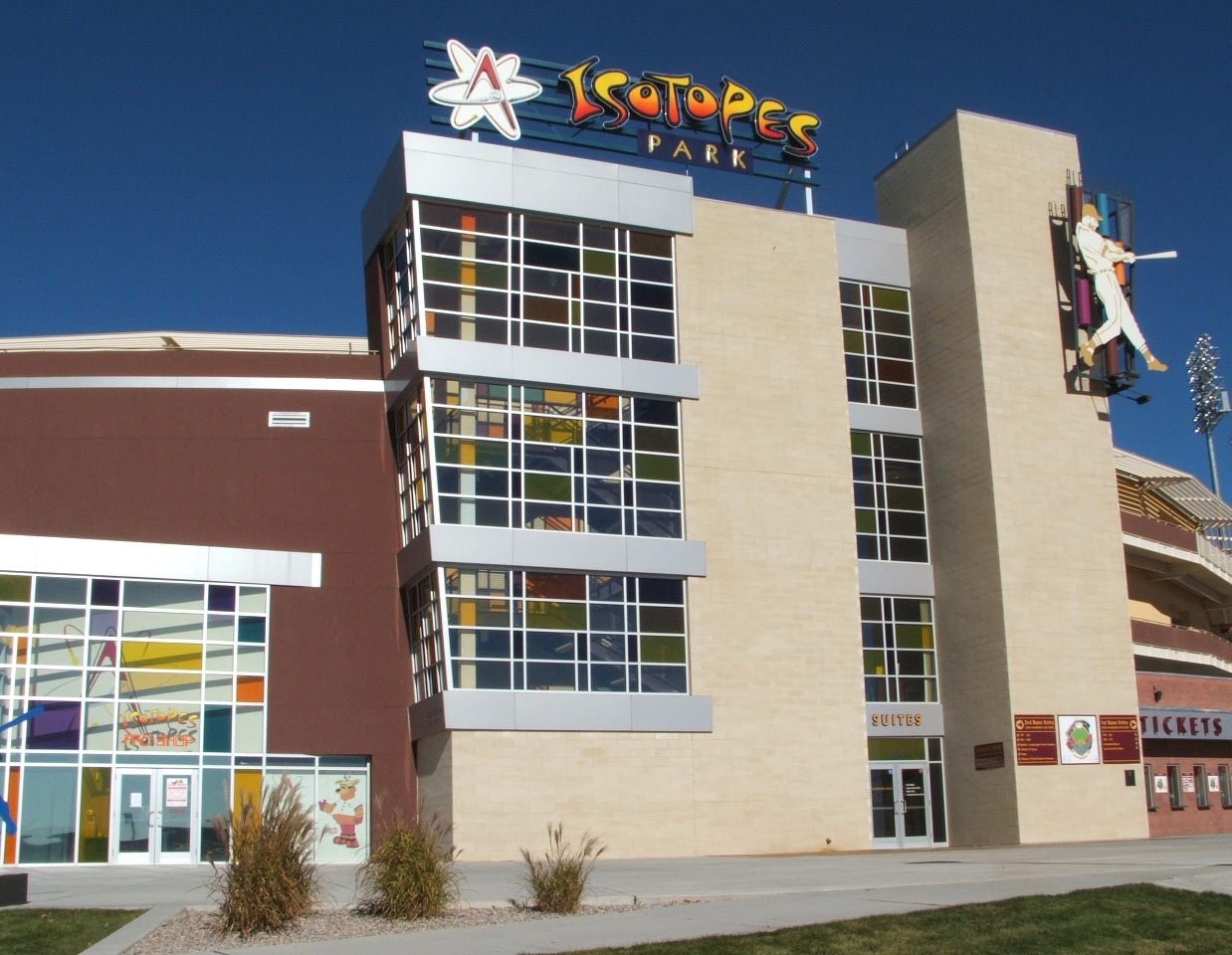
The exterior facade

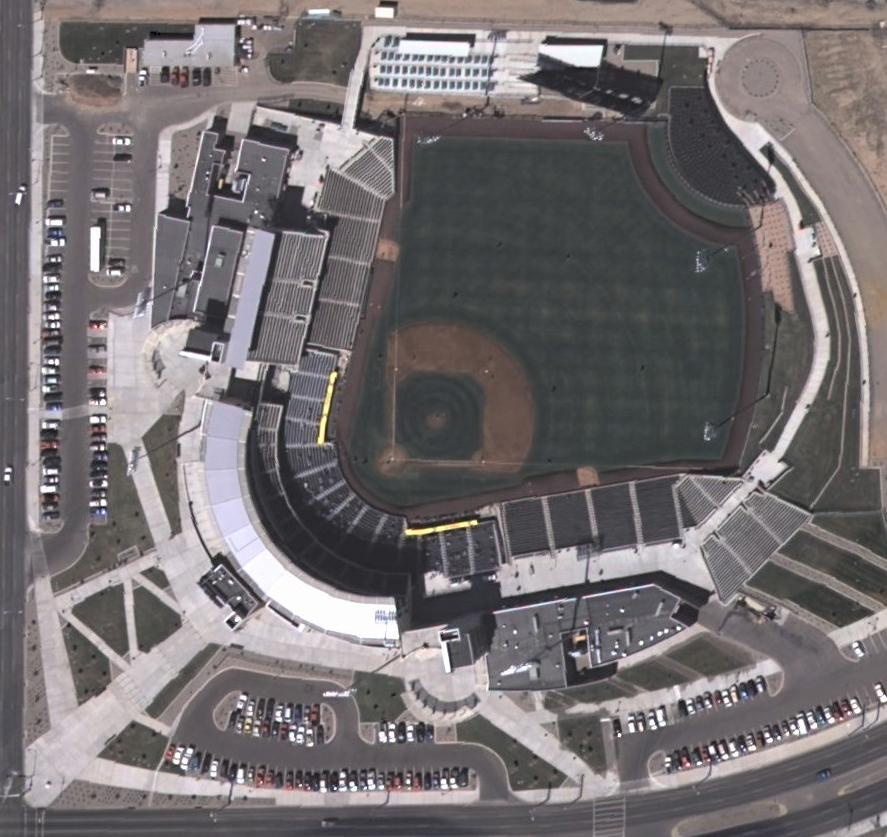
Satellite image taken March 2004

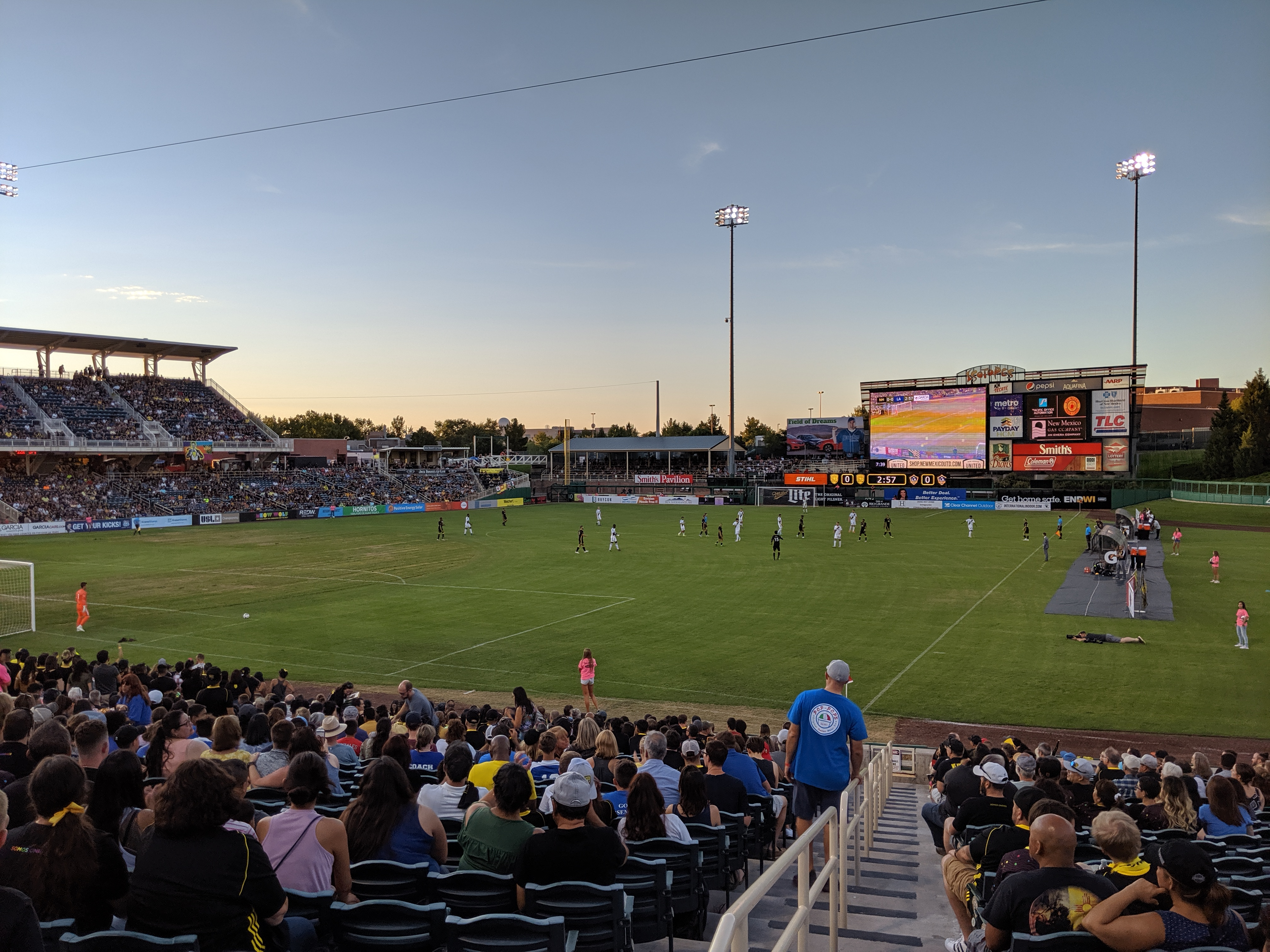
New Mexico United v. LA Galaxy II at Isotopes Park on 17 August 2019

== See also ==
- List of NCAA Division I baseball venues
