= New Mexico United =

American professional soccer club based in Albuquerque

- Full name: New Mexico United
- Nicknames: The Black and Yellow, The Kings of Chaos, Roadrunners
- Founded: June 6, 2018; 8 years ago
- Stadium: Isotopes Park
- Capacity: 13,500
- Owner: Peter Trevisani
- Head coach: Dennis Sanchez
- League: USL Championship
- 2025: 3rd, Western Conference; Playoffs: Conference Finals
- Website: newmexicoutd.com
Home colors	Away colors	Third colors

New Mexico United is an American professional soccer team based in Albuquerque, New Mexico. Founded on June 6, 2018, the team currently plays in the USL Championship, the second division of American soccer. The team is owned by Peter Trevisani, with head coach Dennis Sanchez, and play their home games at Isotopes Park which has a capacity of around 13,500 people.

Playing its first USL game in 2019, New Mexico United has since competed in both the league and U.S. Open Cup. Their best league finishes to date were Conference Finals appearances in 2025 and 2026, while their best cup run was in 2024.

== History ==
=== Former teams ===
The state of New Mexico gained its first professional soccer team in the 1990s, the New Mexico Chiles of the American Professional Soccer League and later the USISL. The team was runner-up for the league title in 1995 and attracted an average home attendance of 3,854, but was folded by its owners in 1996. The Chiles was replaced the following season by the Albuquerque Geckos, who entered USISL's Division 3 with new owners and played at a new soccer stadium shared with the collegiate New Mexico Lobos. The Geckos won the Division 3 championship and were promoted to the second division A-League in 1998, but struggled to win matches and were unable to pay players and creditors. The team had an average attendance of 1,200 and announced their move to Sacramento, California in October 1998.

A semi-professional team, the Albuquerque Sol, was established in 2014 to capitalize on the area's interest in soccer. The team's owners stated that their goal was to earn a USL expansion team within a few years and eventually move to Major League Soccer (MLS). The Sol commissioned a study in 2016 to analyze a potential downtown soccer-specific stadium with 10,000 seats to support a USL expansion in 2018 and a MLS expansion by 2024. The stadium study identified three potential locations in downtown Albuquerque for a stadium, which would cost $24–45 million.

=== USL launch and inaugural season ===
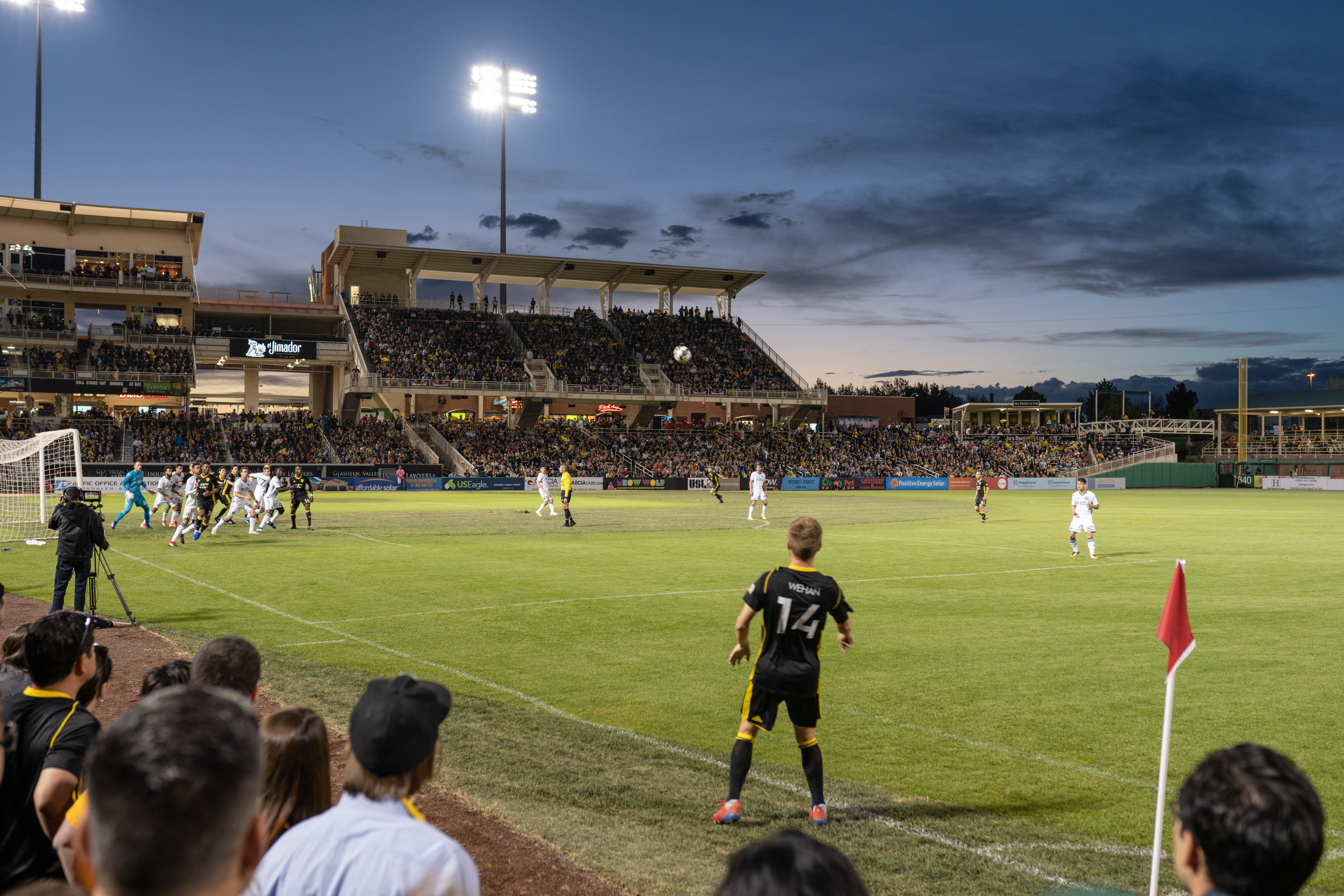
New Mexico United's Chris Wehan takes a corner kick during a USLC match in 2019

On June 6, 2018, the USL announced an expansion club from Albuquerque that would begin play in March 2019. The club announced its name, New Mexico United, and colors on October 9, 2018, following fan suggestions that generated 226 total names.

The team played its opening match on March 9, 2019, with 12,896 fans in attendance at Isotopes Park. Devon Sandoval scored the team's first-ever goal in a 1–1 draw against Fresno FC. New Mexico United enjoyed popular success in its inaugural season, leading the USL Championship in average attendance and selling out Isotopes Park with 15,023 spectators on May 5, 2019. In the 2019 U.S. Open Cup, the team defeated two MLS clubs (the Colorado Rapids and FC Dallas) before losing in the quarterfinals to Minnesota United FC; for the match in Minnesota, the club organized a charter flight from Albuquerque that carried 180 away fans.

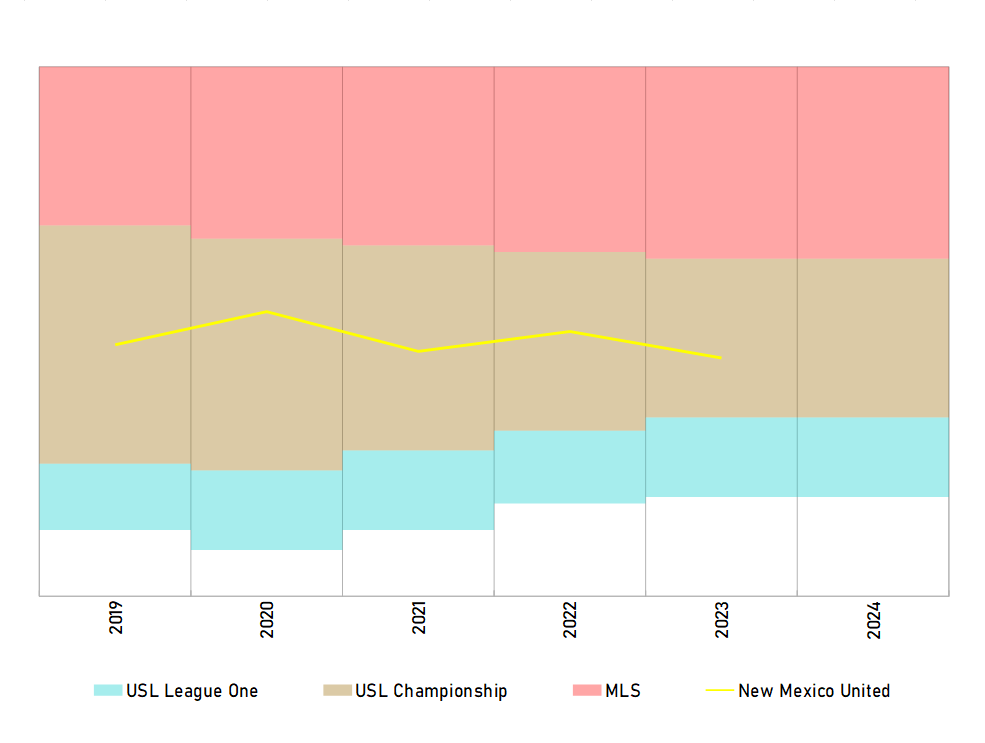
Historical chart of New Mexico United's regular season performance within the American soccer pyramid

=== 2020 season ===
In March 2020, the USL Championship postponed the 2020 season with the onset of the COVID-19 pandemic, after New Mexico United had played one game. The season restarted in July 2020 with a modified format, placing teams into eight smaller regional groups. The club was placed in Group C with Four Corners opponents Colorado Springs Switchbacks FC and Real Monarchs, and nearby El Paso Locomotive FC. Due to statewide health orders and quarantine requirements, New Mexico United played all 15 of their regular season matches and both of their playoff matches away from home, earning the local nickname the "Road Warriors." The team ended the regular season with a record of 8 wins, 3 draws, and 4 losses; a sixteenth planned match against Rio Grande Valley FC Toros was postponed, and eventually cancelled, due to cases of COVID-19 in the Rio Grande Valley organization.

The club qualified for the USL Championship Playoffs by coming second in their group. In the Western Conference Quarterfinals, they defeated San Antonio FC in extra time, with Chris Wehan scoring the winning goal in the 101st minute. In the Conference Semifinal, the club lost to El Paso Locomotive 3–5 on penalties, after drawing 1–1 at the end of extra time.

In March 2020, the club launched the Somos Unidos Foundation, a charitable nonprofit arm of the New Mexico United organization.

=== 2021 season ===
In May 2021, New Mexico United began its competitive season with a 1-0 loss away to Rio Grande Valley FC Toros. On August 21, then 17-year-old Cristian Nava became the first New Mexico United Academy player to sign a professional contract with the club.

== Club crest and colors ==
The club's branding draws inspiration from the Zia symbol, seen here on the state flag of New Mexico.

The New Mexico United crest is a simple yellow shield with four black lines that represent the Zia symbol, found on the state flag and used with permission from the Zia people. The crest also has a black diamond with the number "18", representing the year the club was founded. The yellow-and-black color scheme was colored to reference the state flag while differentiating itself from other local clubs.

=== Kit history ===
Home, away, and third kits.

- Home

2019	2020–21	2022–25	2026

- Away

2019	2020–21	2022–23	2024–25	2026

- Third

2021	2023	2026

=== Sponsorship ===
Season	Kit manufacturer	Shirt sponsor
2019	Adidas	Meow Wolf (home); KraneShares (away)
2020	Puma	Meow Wolf (home); KraneShares (away)
2021–2023	Puma	Meow Wolf; New Mexico True; Electric Playhouse (third)
2024–present	Puma	Meow Wolf (home); Sandia Resort and Casino (away)

== Stadium ==
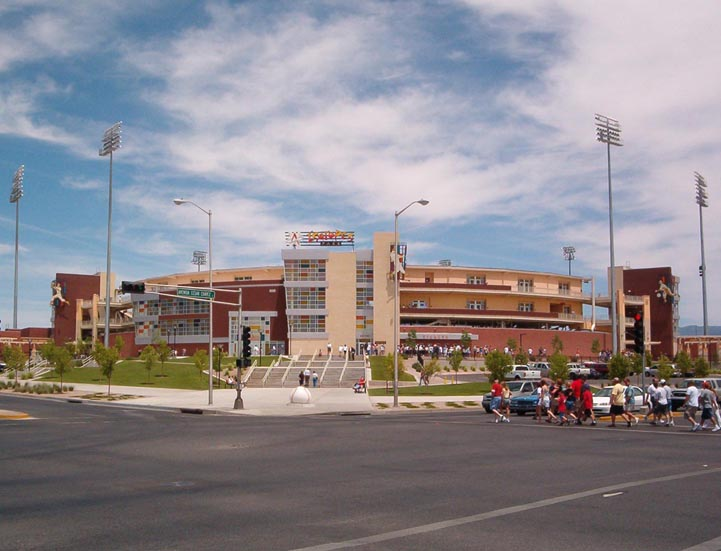
The entrance to Rio Grande Credit Union Field at Isotopes Park in 2005

The club plays at Rio Grande Credit Union Field at Isotopes Park, known as only Isotopes Park in 2019 and nicknamed The Lab, a baseball stadium that is primarily home to the Albuquerque Isotopes of the Pacific Coast League. New Mexico United will play at the facility until a soccer-specific stadium is built. The Isotopes will remain the primary tenant and the USL team will schedule its home games during away games for the Isotopes. The stadium seats 13,500 spectators for baseball games.

In February 2020, New Mexico United announced that it would develop a home stadium and community culture center after being awarded $4.1 million in capital outlay funds by the state legislature. A public poll of Albuquerque residents conducted in January 2021 found strong support for the construction of the stadium and culture center complex.

On July 25, 2021, Albuquerque Mayor Tim Keller announced a stadium financing plan that would involve selling $50 million in public bonds to fund part of the $65–75 million construction cost. The team agreed to commit $10 million in upfront costs, and another $22 million in rent over the next 25 years. The plan was forwarded to the City Council, which agreed to put it to a public vote on November 2. The ballot measure was rejected by a 2–1 margin.

On August 20, 2024, the Albuquerque City Council approved the construction of the new home stadium to be located at the Balloon Fiesta Park.

== Rivalries ==
New Mexico United has rivalries with El Paso Locomotive FC, with whom they contest the Derby Del Camino Real, and Phoenix Rising FC.

== Supporters ==
New Mexico United has five supporters' group: The Curse, The Black Diamonds, The Cursitos, Galactic Ambassadors and La Maldición.

== Players and staff ==
=== Current roster ===
As of April 11, 2026

Note: Flags indicate national team as defined under FIFA eligibility rules; some limited exceptions apply. Players may hold more than one non-FIFA nationality.

No.	Pos.	Nation	Player
2	DF	FIN	Niko Hämäläinen
3	DF	USA	Chris Gloster
4	DF	USA	Kipp Keller
5	MF	ANT	Dayonn Harris
6	MF	USA	Gedion Zelalem
7	FW	BRB	Niall Reid-Stephen
8	FW	USA	Marlon Vargas
9	FW	USA	Justin Rennicks
10	FW	SCO	Greg Hurst
11	FW	USA	Cristian Nava
13	GK	USA	Kris Shakes
15	MF	USA	Ousman Jabang
17	FW	USA	Jake LaCava

No.	Pos.	Nation	Player
18	MF	FRA	Sofiane Djeffal
19	DF	PHI	Zico Bailey
21	MF	FRA	Valentin Noël
24	DF	ENG	Tyler Blackett
27	DF	JAM	Maliek Howell
28	MF	USA	Cam Wilkerson
29	FW	GLP	Luther Archimède
31	FW	LBR	Joseph Melto Quiah
48	FW	USA	Grady Gilchrist
54	GK	USA	Taren White
56	GK	CUB	Raiko Arozarena
79	DF	USA	Kyle Hofmann

1. USL Academy Contract

=== Technical staff ===
Title	Name
Sporting Director	Itamar Keinan
Head Coach	Dennis Sanchez
First Assistant Coach	Luke Sanford
Director of Goalkeeping	Armando Quezada
Assistant Coach	Daniel Bruce
High Performance Director	José Marmolejo
Head Athletic Trainer	Quentin Higgins
Academy Head Coach	David Estrada

Last updated: February 27, 2026
Source: New Mexico United

=== Front office ===
Title	Name
Owner and CEO	Peter Trevisani
President	Ron Patel
Vice President	Clint Gray
Executive Director of the Somos Unidos Foundation	Phia Smith
Senior Manager, Production & Impact	Jules Myers

Last updated: March 28, 2026
Source: New Mexico United

=== Ownership ===
The club's majority owner and team president is New Mexico resident, Peter Trevisani. The club's other owners have ties to New Mexico and include investor Ian McKinnon, TEAM8, Ed Garcia, Ben Spencer, and Jason Harrington.

== Team records ==
As of match played November 9, 2024

=== Year-by-year total ===
Season	Results							League Pos	Top Scorer ^{1}		Club Captain
Season	P	W	D	L	GF	GA	Pts ^{2}	League Pos	Player	G	Club Captain
2019	40	13	15	12	69	71	54	10th, Western	(Jamaica) Kevaughn Frater	17	(United States) Josh Suggs
2020	17	9	4	4	25	18	31	2nd, Group C	(United States) Chris Wehan	7	(United States) Josh Suggs
2021	32	12	10	10	44	40	46	5th, Mountain	(United States) Chris Wehan	10	(United States) Josh Suggs
2022	37	14	12	11	54	44	54	5th, Western	(United States) Justin Portillo	8	(United States) Josh Suggs
2023	38	15	7	16	59	53	52	8th, Western	(El Salvador) Amando Moreno	10	(United States) Sam Hamilton
2024	40	22	5	13	59	52	71	1st, Western	(Scotland) Greg Hurst	13	(United States) Kalen Ryden
2025	38	17	8	13	60	52	48	3rd, Western	Two players	7	(United States) Kalen Ryden
All-time results ^{3}								All-time records			
—	242	102	61	79	370	330	356	—	(United States) Chris Wehan	39	—

1. Top Scorer includes all competitive matches.

2. Points assigns the same point values to knockout matches as the same result would receive in the league.

3. All-time results includes all competitive matches.

=== USL Championship ===
Season	USL Championship								Play-offs	Top Scorer ^{1}	
Season	P	W	D	L	GF	GA	Pts	Pos	Play-offs	Player	G
2019	34	11	13	10	59	57	46	10th, Western	Conference Play-In Round	(Jamaica) Kevaughn Frater	14
2020	15	8	3	4	23	17	27	2nd, Group C	Conference Semifinal	(United States) Chris Wehan	6
2021	32	12	10	10	44	40	46	5th, Mountain	Did not qualify	(United States) Chris Wehan	10
2022	34	13	12	9	49	40	51	5th, Western	Conference Quarterfinals	(United States) Justin Portillo	8
2023	34	13	7	14	51	49	46	8th, Western	Conference Quarterfinals	(El Salvador) Amando Moreno	10
2024	34	18	5	11	46	44	59	1st, Western	Conference Semifinals	(Scotland) Greg Hurst	12
2025	30	14	6	10	45	41	48	3rd, Western	Conference Finals	Two players	8

1. Top Scorer includes statistics from regular season league matches only.

==== USL Championship Playoffs ====
Season	USL Championship Playoffs^{1}								Top Scorer	
Season	P	W	D	L	GF	GA	Entered	Exited	Player	G
2019	1	0	0	1	1	2	Conference Play-In Round		(United States) Devon Sandoval	1
2020	2	1	1	0	2	1	Conference Quarterfinal	Conference Semifinal	(United States) Chris Wehan (Jamaica) Romeo Parkes	1
2021	DNQ									
2022	1	0	0	1	0	2	Conference Quarterfinals	Conference Quarterfinals	–	–
2023	1	0	0	1	0	1	Conference Quarterfinals	Conference Quarterfinals	–	–
2024	2	1	0	1	2	2	Conference Quarterfinals	Conference Semifinals	(United States) Mukwelle Akale (United States) Will Seymore	1
2025	3	2	0	1	4	4	Conference Quarterfinal	Conference Finals	Six players	1

1. Following statistical convention, wins in extra time are recorded as wins. Wins in penalty shootouts are recorded as draws, and shootout goals are not counted as goals for or against.

=== U.S. Open Cup ===
Season	U.S. Open Cup^{1}								Top Scorer	
Season	P	W	D	L	GF	GA	Entered	Exited	Player	G
2019	5	2	2	1	9	12	Second round	Quarterfinals	(United States) Devon Sandoval (Jamaica) Kevaughn Frater	3
2020	Cancelled ^{2}									
2021	DNQ / Cancelled ^{3}									
2022	2	1	0	1	6	2	Second round	Third round	(United States) Jerome Kiesewetter	2
2023	3	2	0	1	8	3	Second round	Round of 32	(England) Josh Dolling	4
2024	4	3	0	1	11	6	Third round	Quarterfinals	(Philippines) Zico Bailey	2
2025	1	0	1	0	2	2	Third rounds	Third round	Two players	1

1. Following statistical convention, wins in extra time are recorded as wins. Wins in penalty shootouts are recorded as draws, and shootout goals are not counted as goals for or against.

2. The 2020 U.S. Open Cup was suspended on March 13, 2020, due to the COVID-19 pandemic. On August 14, the 2020 edition was cancelled.

3. The USSF confirmed on March 29, 2021, that the previous season's Conference finalists would participate. As Western Conference losing semifinalists, New Mexico United did not qualify. On July 20, 2021, the USSF cancelled the 2021 edition of the tournament.

=== Head coaches ===
- Includes USL Regular Season, USL Playoffs, U.S. Open Cup. Excludes friendlies.

Coach	Nationality	Start	End	Matches	Win	Loss	Draw	Win %
Troy Lesesne	United States	August 13, 2018	November 5, 2021	89	34	29	26	38.20
Zach Prince	United States	November 15, 2021	June 3, 2023	26	11	6	9	42.31
Eric Quill	United States	June 13, 2023	November 20, 2024	61	30	21	10	49.18
Dennis Sanchez	United States	December 24, 2024	present	0	0	0	0	—

=== Average attendance ===
Year	Reg. season	Playoffs	U.S. Open Cup
2019	12,693 (1st in USL Championship)	Did not play at home	Did not play at home
2020	Did not play at home	Did not play at home	Cancelled
2021	7,863 (2nd in USL Championship)	DNQ	Cancelled
2022	10,617 (1st in USL Championship)	Did not play at home	2,128 (1 match)
2023	9,619 (4th in USL Championship)	Did not play at home	2,903 (2 matches)
2024	9,386 (4th in USL Championship)	10,748 (2 matches)	3,233 (2 matches)
2025	9,528 (3rd in USL Championship)	9,219 (2 matches)	2,124 (1 match)
2026	8,956 (3rd in USL Championship after 12 matches)	TBD	979 (2 matches)

== Player records ==
=== Most goals ===
- Players in **bold** are still active with New Mexico United; includes goals in all competitive matches
  - Includes regular season, playoffs, and domestic cup
- As of July 23, 2022.

Rank	Player	Nation	Years active	Goals
1	**Chris Wehan**	(United States)	2019-2020, 2021–present	34
2	**Devon Sandoval**	(United States)	2019–2021	25
3	Kevaughn Frater	(Jamaica)	2019	17
4	Santi Moar	(Spain)	2019	12
5	**Amando Moreno**	(El Salvador)	2020–present	11
6	**Neco Brett**	(Jamaica)	2021–present	7
7	**Daniel Bruce**	(England)	2019–present	5
8	**Josh Suggs**	(United States)	2019–present	4
10	David Estrada	(Mexico) / (United States)	2019-2020	3
10	Andrew Tinari	(United States)	2020-2021	3
10	**Ilija Ilić**	(Serbia)	2021-present	3

=== Most appearances ===
- Players in **bold** are still active with New Mexico United; includes all competitive appearances, including substitute appearances
  - Includes regular season, playoffs, and domestic cup
- As of July 3, 2024

Rank	Player	Nation	Years active	Apps.
1	**Daniel Bruce**	(England)	2019–present	137
2	Josh Suggs	(United States)	2019–2023	120
3	Devon Sandoval	(United States)	2019–2022	92
4	**Chris Wehan**	(United States)	2019-2020, 2021–present	74
5	Juan Pablo Guzmán	(Colombia)	2019–2021	73
5	**Austin Yearwood**	(United States)	2019–present	73
7	Rashid Tetteh	(Ghana)	2019–2022	69
8	Justin Schmidt	(United States)	2019–2021	60
9	Cody Mizell	(United States)	2019–2020, 2022	58
10	**Sam Hamilton**	(United States)	2019–present	57

== Honors ==
USL Championship

- USL Western Conference
  - Winners (Regular season) (2): 2024 2026

== New Mexico United U23 ==
On January 23, 2020, New Mexico United announced that it will field a U23 team in the USL League Two for the 2020 season with Luke Sanford, the director of the youth academy, as head manager., intending for the U23 team to bridge the gap between the High Performance Youth Program and the first team. The club was scheduled to compete in the Mountain Division. However, on April 30, 2020, the United Soccer League announced the cancellation of the 2020 League Two season due to the COVID-19 pandemic in the United States. The U23 team did not participate in the 2021 USL League Two season.
