= 2026 Lexington SC season =

2026 Soccer club season

Lexington SC
2026 season
- Owners: Bill and Donna Shively Stephen Dawahare
- Head coach: Masaki Hemmi
- Stadium: Lexington SC Stadium; Lexington, Kentucky
- USLC: Western Conference: 4th
- USLC playoffs: Conference Quarter-finals
- U.S. Open Cup: DNQ
- USL Cup: Group stage
- Top goalscorer: Cameron Lancaster (8)
- Highest home attendance: 8,277 (March 6, against Louisville City FC)
- Lowest home attendance: 3,303 (March 25, against Brooklyn FC)
- Average home league attendance: 4.791
Home colours	Away colours

The 2026 Lexington SC season was the club's fourth season since their establishment on October 5, 2021. The club competed in their second season in the USL Championship, the second tier of American soccer.

Over the offseason, Lexington SC underwent a coaching change. Terry Boss, who was the first coach of the club's USL Championship existence, was let go, with the decision being fueled by the club missing out on the 2025 playoffs by two points. Boss was replaced by Masaki Hemmi, who was the previous coach of the women's Lexington SC club.

== Staff ==
Position	Name
Head coach	(Japan) Masaki Hemmi
Assistant coach	(England) Jordan Stewart
Assistant coach	(Republic of Ireland) Shane O'Neill
Director of Goalkeeping	(United States) Josh Oldroyd
Director of Sports Science & Performance	(Brazil) Flávio Grava
Director of Soccer Operations	(United States) Nick Gettelfinger
Data Analyst/Video Assistant	(United States) Justin Stone
Equipment Manager	(United States) Logan Dahler
Head Athletic Trainer	(United States) David Stickney

== Season squad ==
As of September 14, 2026

Note: Flags indicate national team as defined under FIFA eligibility rules; some limited exceptions apply. Players may hold more than one non-FIFA nationality.

No.	Pos.	Nation	Player
2	DF	TTO	Jacob Greene
5	DF	USA	Kendall Burks
6	MF	IRL	Aaron Molloy
7	MF	USA	Marcus Epps
8	MF	BRA	Nick Firmino
9	FW	USA	Phillip Goodrum
12	DF	USA	Xavier Zengue
13	MF	USA	Cielo Tschantret (on loan from Sporting KC)
14	DF	USA	Andrew Carbon (Academy Contract)
15	MF	UGA	Noble Okello
16	MF	USA	Blaine Ferri
17	GK	GER	Oliver Semmle
19	FW	JAM	Tarik Scott

No.	Pos.	Nation	Player
20	FW	GER	Milo Yosef
21	DF	ENG	Marqes Muir
23	DF	JAM	Javain Brown
24	DF	USA	Brady Stockton (Academy Contract)
27	MF	GBS	Braudilio Rodrigues
31	GK	USA	Brooks Thompson
34	FW	USA	Malcolm Fry (on loan from New England Revolution)
40	GK	USA	Garrett Addams (Academy Contract)
77	FW	USA	Jonathan Lewis
96	MF	USA	Luis Felipe
98	DF	USA	Patrick Seagrist

=== Out on loan ===
Note: Flags indicate national team as defined under FIFA eligibility rules; some limited exceptions apply. Players may hold more than one non-FIFA nationality.

No.	Pos.	Nation	Player
4	DF	ESP	Arturo Ordoñez (on loan to Hartford Athletic)
10	MF	NGR	Michael Adedokun (on loan to Hartford Athletic)
18	FW	USA	Malik Henry-Scott (on loan to Indy Eleven)
22	DF	USA	Joe Hafferty (on loan to Indy Eleven)

== Competitions ==
=== USL Championship ===
==== Standings ====
Pos	Team	Pld	W	L	T	GF	GA	GD	Pts	Qualification
2	Sacramento Republic FC	30	13	5	12	42	28	+14	51	Playoffs
3	El Paso Locomotive FC	30	15	10	5	48	38	+10	50	Playoffs
4	Lexington SC	30	14	10	6	57	39	+18	48	Playoffs
5	Colorado Springs Switchbacks FC	30	13	9	8	44	38	+6	47	Playoffs
6	San Antonio FC	30	11	7	12	32	30	+2	45	Playoffs

Updated to match(es) played on October 24, 2026. Source: USL Championship Standings
Rules for classification: 1) total wins against conference opponents; 2) goal differential against conference opponents; 3) goals scored against conference opponents; 4) head-to-head points against conference opponents; 5) points per game against conference opponents; 6) points per game against non-conference opponents; 7) fewest disciplinary points; 8) coin toss or drawing of lots

==== Matches ====
On December 16, 2025, the USL Championship released the schedule for all 25 teams for both the regular season and the USL Cup.

All times are in Eastern Standard Time.

===== March =====
March 6 1	Lexington SC	1–2	Louisville City FC	Lexington, Kentucky
7:30 PM	Molloy 18'	Report	Akale 52'; McFadden 85'	Stadium: Lexington SC Stadium; Attendance: 8,277; Referee: Elton García

March 14 2	Lexington SC	0–0	Sacramento Republic FC	Lexington, Kentucky
7:00 PM		Report		Stadium: Lexington SC Stadium; Attendance: 5,585; Referee: Matthew Thompson

March 25 3	Lexington SC	3–0	Brooklyn FC	Lexington, Kentucky
7:00 PM	Molloy 74'; Ferri 84'; Henry-Scott 90+1'	Report		Stadium: Lexington SC Stadium; Attendance: 3,303; Referee: Elvis Osmanovic

March 29 4	San Antonio FC	2–0	Lexington SC	San Antonio, Texas
4:00 PM	Hernandez 28'; Erofeev 75'	Report		Stadium: Toyota Field; Attendance: 5,905; Referee: Brad Jensen

===== April =====
April 4 5	Colorado Springs Switchbacks FC	2–2	Lexington SC	Colorado Springs, Colorado
5:00 PM	Zengue 11'		Bennett 79'	Stadium: Weidner Field

April 11 6	Lexington SC	1–3	Rhode Island FC	Lexington, Kentucky
7:00 PM	Greene 85'		Sanchez 22'; Kwizera 27'; Afonso 68'	Stadium: Lexington SC Stadium; Attendance: 4,577; Referee: Brandon Stevis

April 18 7	Orange County SC	0–0	Lexington SC	Irvine, CA
10:00 PM		Report		Stadium: Championship Soccer Stadium; Attendance: 4,077; Referee: Muhammad Hassan

===== May =====
May 2 8	Las Vegas Lights FC	2–1	Lexington SC	Las Vegas, Nevada
10:30 PM	Rodriguez 11'; Pinzón 38'; Ybarra (red card) 83'	Report	Molloy 6'	Stadium: Cashman Field; Attendance: 2,116; Referee: Alex Billeter

May 8 9	Lexington SC	3–1	Monterey Bay FC	Lexington, Kentucky
7:30 PM	Firmino 26', 31'; Goodrum 56'	Report	Lletget 64'	Stadium: Lexington SC Stadium; Attendance: 5,108; Referee: Gerald Flores

May 23 10	Indy Eleven	3–1	Lexington SC	Indianapolis, Indiana
7:00 PM	Rendón (yellow card) 4', (goal) 13'; O'Brien 71'; Sing 76'; Quinn (yellow card) 90'	Report	Brown (red card) 3'; Zengue (yellow card) 32'; Molloy 51', (yellow card) 56'; Goodrum (yellow card) 80'	Stadium: Carroll Stadium; Attendance: 8,745; Referee: Luis Arroyo

May 30 11	El Paso Locomotive FC	1–4	Lexington SC	El Paso, Texas
9:00 PM	Abitia (red card) 29'; Coronado (red card) 62'; Rubín 89' (pen.)	Report	Quezada 9' (o.g.); Epps 44'; Goodrum 64'; Scott 81'	Stadium: Southwest University Park; Attendance: 5,668; Referee: Matthew Corrigan

===== June =====
June 13 12	Lexington SC	2–0	San Antonio FC	Lexington, Kentucky
7:00 PM	Ferri 48'; Rodrigues 68'	Report		Stadium: Lexington SC Stadium; Attendance: 4,010; Referee: John Griggs

===== July =====
July 4 13	Tampa Bay Rowdies	1–4	Lexington SC	St. Petersburg, Florida
6:00 PM	Vivi 78'	Report	Zengue 12'; Firmino 14'; Epps 44'; Scott 86'	Stadium: Al Lang Stadium; Attendance: 4,997; Referee: Chris Penso

July 15 14	Lexington SC	1–4	New Mexico United	Lexington, Kentucky
7:00 PM	Goodrum 70'	Report	Hurst 43' (pen.), 62'; Noël 45+3'; Quiah 68'	Stadium: Lexington SC Stadium; Attendance: 4,411; Referee: Elvis Osmanovic

July 22 15	Lexington SC	2–0	Oakland Roots SC	Lexington, Kentucky
7:00 PM	Goodrum 50'; Ferri 63'	Report		Stadium: Lexington SC Stadium; Attendance: 4,309; Referee: Alyssa Pennington

July 25 16	FC Tulsa	0–0	Lexington SC	Tulsa, Oklahoma
8:30 PM		Report		Stadium: Oneok Field; Attendance: 3,496; Referee: Jeremy Scheer

===== August =====
August 1 17	Lexington SC	3–2	Monterey Bay FC	Lexington, Kentucky
7:00 PM	Rodrigues 29'; Nakamura 42' (o.g.); Scott 82'	Report	Lletget 2'; Barajas 26'	Stadium: Lexington SC Stadium; Attendance: 3,777; Referee: Cristian Campo Hernández

August 8 18	Lexington SC	1–0	Phoenix Rising FC	Lexington, Kentucky
7:00 PM	Rodrigues 63'	Report	Biasi (red card) 85'	Stadium: Lexington SC Stadium; Attendance: 5,306; Referee: Abdou Ndiaye

August 15 19	Sacramento Republic FC	1–0	Lexington SC	Sacramento, California
11:00 PM	Edwards 87'	Report		Stadium: Heart Health Park; Attendance: 11,126; Referee: Gerald Flores

August 22 20	Lexington SC	2–0	Las Vegas Lights FC	Lexington, Kentucky
7:00 PM	Firmino 51'; Epps 53'	Report		Stadium: Lexington SC Stadium; Attendance: 4,399; Referee: Robert Vincze

August 26 21	New Mexico United	2–1	Lexington SC	Albuquerque, New Mexico
9:30 PM	Keller 73'; Reid-Stephen 78'	Report	Muir 51'	Stadium: Isotopes Park; Attendance: 6,881; Referee: Amin Hadzic

August 29 22	Lexington SC	0–1	Colorado Springs Switchbacks FC	Lexington, Kentucky
7:00 PM		Report	Fjeldberg 74'	Stadium: Lexington SC Stadium; Attendance: 4,816; Referee: Deny Kulasinac

===== September =====
September 5 23	Sporting Club Jacksonville	3–2	Lexington SC	Jacksonville, Florida
7:00 PM	Sadlier 19'; Jääskeläinen 88'; Al-Qaq 90+4'	Report	Epps 73'; Zengue 84'	Stadium: Hodges Stadium; Attendance: 1,175; Referee: Carlos Rodriguez

September 12 24	Oakland Roots	1–4	Lexington SC	Oakland, California
10:00 PM	Wilson 52'	Report	Goodrum 22', 78', 87'; Epps 83'	Stadium: Oakland Coliseum; Referee: Benjamin Meyer

September 19 25	Lexington SC	6–0	Orange County SC	Lexington, Kentucky
7:00 PM	Goodrum 9', 24', 49'; Epps 15'; Firmino 35'; Tschantret 85'	Report		Stadium: Lexington SC Stadium; Attendance: 4,209; Referee: Mark Verso

September 26 26	Monterey Bay FC	2–3	Lexington SC	Seaside, California
10:00 PM	Farnsworth 5'; Otoya 85'; Egwu (yellow card) 55' (yellow-red card) 90'	Report	Firmino 1'; Goodrum 74'; Epps 80'	Stadium: Cardinale Stadium; Attendance: 3,182; Referee: Muhammad Hassan

===== October =====
October 3 27	Lexington SC	3–1	El Paso Locomotive FC	Lexington, Kentucky
7:00 PM	Zengue 32'; Goodrum 62'; Rodrigues 66'	Report	Ortiz (red card) 27'; Moreno 37'	Stadium: Lexington SC Stadium; Attendance: 4,677; Referee: Brad Jensen

October 9 28	Lexington SC	0–0	FC Tulsa	Lexington, Kentucky
7:30 PM		Report		Stadium: Lexington SC Stadium; Attendance: 5,102; Referee: Elton García

October 17 29	Las Vegas Lights FC	3–5	Lexington SC	Las Vegas, Nevada
10:30 PM	Locker 25'; Anderson 45+2'; Leal 81'	Report	Zengue 4'; Firmino 39', 62'; Ferri 75'; Seagrist 90+1'	Stadium: Cashman Field; Referee: Igor Bych

October 24 30	Phoenix Rising FC	3–3	Lexington SC	Phoenix, Arizona
10:00 PM	Sacko 10'; Studenthofft 29'; Goodrum 53' (o.g.)	Report	Goodrum 45+1'; Rodrigues 65'; Molloy 77'	Stadium: Phoenix Rising Soccer Stadium; Attendance: 7,522; Referee: Nabil Bensalah

=== USL Championship playoffs ===
As the fourth seed in the Western Conference, Lexington qualified for the playoffs, matched up at home against fifth seeded Colorado Springs Switchbacks FC. After playing to a 1–1 draw in regular and extra time, Lexington SC's season ultimately ended following a 5–4 loss in a penalty shootout.

November 1 Quarter-finals	Lexington SC	1–1 (a.e.t.) (4–5 p)	Colorado Springs Switchbacks FC	Lexington, Kentucky
2:00 PM ET	Goodrum 12' (pen.); Brown (yellow card) 56'; Greene (yellow card) 92'; Tschantret (yellow card) 96'; Rodrigues (yellow card) 111'	Report	Bennett 78' (pen.); Creek (yellow card) 117'	Stadium: Lexington SC Stadium; Attendance: 4,909; Referee: Brandon Stevis
	Penalties
	Molloy (penalty scored); Rodrigues (penalty scored); Goodrum (penalty scored); Epps (penalty scored); Okello (penalty missed)		(penalty scored) Tejada; (penalty scored) Hanya; (penalty scored) Amoh; (penalty scored) Maples; (penalty scored) Bennett

=== USL Cup ===
Lexington participated in the third edition of the USL Cup, the second edition to feature teams from both the USL Championship and League One.

==== Group stage standings ====
Pos	Lg	Team	Pld	W	PKW	PKL	L	GF	GA	GD	Pts
3	USLC	Indy Eleven	4	1	2	0	1	5	4	+1	7
4	USL1	Union Omaha	4	2	0	0	2	10	12	−2	6
5	USLC	Lexington SC	4	1	1	1	1	7	7	0	6
6	USL1	Forward Madison FC	4	1	0	0	3	6	10	−4	3
7	USL1	Fort Wayne FC	4	0	0	1	3	6	11	−5	1

==== Group matches ====
April 25, 2026	Lexington SC	4–2	Forward Madison FC	Lexington, Kentucky
7:00 p.m.	Zengue 39'; Greene 63'; Epps 68'; Goodrum 90+2'	Report	Edwards 45+1'; Zengue 70' (o.g.)	Stadium: Lexington SC Stadium; Attendance: 4,209; Referee: Jorge Escobar

June 6, 2026	Detroit City FC	1–1 (1–3 p)	Lexington SC	Hamtramck, Michigan
7:00 p.m.	Montgomery 28'	Report	Blessing 90+5'	Stadium: Keyworth Stadium; Attendance: 6,356; Referee: Thomas Snyder
	Penalties
	Diop (penalty missed); Preston (penalty missed); Stanley (penalty missed); Morris (penalty scored)		(penalty scored) Molloy; (penalty scored) Adedokun; (penalty missed) Firmino; (penalty scored) Epps

June 20, 2026	Lexington SC	0–0 (6–7 p)	Indy Eleven	Lexington, Kentucky
7:00 PM EDT				Stadium: Lexington SC Stadium; Attendance: 5,127; Referee: Sergii Demianchuk
	Penalties
	Molloy (penalty scored); Midence (penalty scored); Ordoñez (penalty scored); Epps (penalty scored); Firmino (penalty scored); Greene (penalty scored)		(penalty scored) O'Brien; (penalty scored) Omar; (penalty scored) Mitrano; (penalty scored) Sharp; (penalty scored) Craig; (penalty scored) Neidlinger; (penalty scored) Rasheed

July 11, 2026	Louisville City FC	4–2	Lexington SC	Louisville, Kentucky
7:00 PM EDT	Wilson 28', 59'; Donovan 34'; Brown 73' (o.g.)	Report	Rodrigues 12'; Zengue 43'	Stadium: Lynn Family Stadium; Attendance: 9,487; Referee: Joshua Encarnacion
