= 2026 Phoenix Rising FC season =

Phoenix Rising FC
2026 season
- Owners: List: Vincere Capital (Pablo Prichard) Berke Bakay Alex Zheng Tim Riester Mark Detmer Brett M. Johnson Didier Drogba Brandon McCarthy Diplo Pete Wentz David Rappaport Dave Stearns Rick Hauser William Kraus Kevin Kusatsu Mark Leber Jim Scussel Christopher Yeung
- Manager: Pa-Modou Kah
- Stadium: Phoenix Rising Soccer Complex
- USL Championship: Conference: 8th
- USLC Playoffs: Conference Quarter-finals
- U.S. Open Cup: Round of 32
- USL Cup: Group stage
- Top goalscorer: League: All: Ihsan Sacko (17)
- Highest home attendance: 7,522 (October 24, against Lexington SC)
- Lowest home attendance: 2,274 (March 17, against San Ramon FC)
- Average home league attendance: 5,138
Home colors	Away colors

The 2026 Phoenix Rising FC season was the club's 13th season in the USL Championship and their 10th as Phoenix Rising FC.

== Competitions ==
=== Friendlies ===
January 24, 2026 Friendly	Phoenix Rising FC	v	Vancouver FC	Phoenix, Arizona
7:00 PM MST				Stadium: Phoenix Rising Soccer Stadium

January 29, 2026 Friendly	Phoenix Rising FC	v	Vancouver FC	Phoenix, Arizona
7:00 PM MST				Stadium: Phoenix Rising Soccer Stadium

February 3, 2026 Friendly	Phoenix Rising FC	v	Vision FC	Phoenix, Arizona
7:00 PM MST				Stadium: Phoenix Rising Soccer Stadium

February 8, 2026 Coachella Valley Invitational	Charlotte FC	2–1	Phoenix Rising FC	Indio, California
	Aloko; Vargas (pen.)			Stadium: Empire Polo Club

February 14, 2026 Friendly	Phoenix Rising FC	0–1	Las Vegas Lights FC	Phoenix, Arizona
12:00 PM MST		Report	73'	Stadium: Phoenix Rising Soccer Stadium

February 21, 2026 Intrasquad; Scrimmage	Phoenix Rising FC Red	v	Phoenix Rising FC White	Phoenix, Arizona
7:00 PM MST				Stadium: Phoenix Rising Soccer Stadium

February 27, 2026 Friendly	Phoenix Rising FC	v	Grand Canyon Antelopes	Phoenix, Arizona
5:30 PM MST				Stadium: Phoenix Rising Soccer Stadium

February 27, 2026 Friendly	Phoenix Rising FC	5–0	Spokane Velocity FC	Phoenix, Arizona
7:30 PM MST	Avayevu 12'; Sacko 38'; Dennis 63', 85'; Moursou 72'	Report		Stadium: Phoenix Rising Soccer Stadium

=== USL Championship ===
Overall								Home						Away					
Pld	W	D	L	GF	GA	GD	Pts	W	D	L	GF	GA	GD	W	D	L	GF	GA	GD
21	6	8	7	29	29	0	26	4	4	2	18	13	+5	2	4	5	11	16	−5

Source: Match reports

=== Regular season matches ===
On December 16, 2025, the USL Championship released the schedule for all 25 clubs.

All times from this point on Arizona Time (UTC-08:00)

March 7, 2026 1	San Antonio FC	2–1	Phoenix Rising FC	San Antonio, Texas
5:30	Hernandez 6'; Crognale 49'	Report	Scearce 54' (pen.)	Stadium: Toyota Field; Attendance: 6,512; Referee: Brandon Stevis

March 14, 2026 2	Phoenix Rising FC	1–1	Orange County SC	Phoenix, Arizona
7:00 PM	Sacko 38'; Carvajal (yellow card) 43' (yellow-red card) 45'	Report	Tubbs (yellow card) 65' (yellow-red card) 85'; Benalcazar 90+3'	Stadium: Phoenix Rising Soccer Stadium; Attendance: 6,026; Referee: Cristian Campo Hernández

March 21, 2026 3	Phoenix Rising FC	2–2	Oakland Roots SC	Phoenix, Arizona
3:00 PM	Gómez 85'; Studenthofft 90+6'	Report	Prentice 42'; Bravo 45+2'	Stadium: Phoenix Rising Soccer Stadium; Attendance: 4,310; Referee: Matthew Thompson

March 28, 2026 4	FC Tulsa	1–1	Phoenix Rising FC	Tulsa, Oklahoma
5:00 PM	Sparks 50'	Report	Carvajal 74'	Stadium: ONEOK Field; Attendance: 4,098; Referee: Calin Radosav

April 4, 2026 5	Sacramento Republic FC	2–0	Phoenix Rising FC	Sacramento, California
7:00 PM	Willey 10' Wanner 24'	Report		Stadium: Heart Health Park; Attendance: 9,308; Referee: Muhammad Hassan

April 11, 2026 6	Phoenix Rising FC	3–0	New Mexico United	Phoenix, Arizona
7:00 PM	Sacko 13', 82'; Scearce (penalty missed) 34', (yellow card) 45+3', (goal) 76'; Moursou (yellow card) 51'	Report	Howell (yellow card) 25'; Gloster (yellow card) 63'; Noël (yellow card) 80'; Hurst (yellow card) 90'	Stadium: Phoenix Rising Soccer Stadium; Attendance: 6,230; Referee: Nabil Bensalah

April 18, 2026 7	Miami FC	0–3	Phoenix Rising FC	Miami, Florida
4:00 PM		Report	Sacko 8' (pen.), 90+3'; Dennis 59'	Stadium: Pitbull Stadium; Attendance: 1,277; Referee: Edson Carvajal

May 2, 2026 8	Pittsburgh Riverhounds SC	0–1	Phoenix Rising FC	Pittsburgh, Pennsylvania
	Lega (yellow card) 53'	Report	Moursou (yellow card) 57'; Sacko 64'; Dennis (yellow card) 89'	Stadium: Highmark Stadium; Attendance: 4,439; Referee: Alyssa Pennington

May 9, 2026 9	Phoenix Rising FC	1–1	San Antonio FC	Phoenix, Arizona
7:00 PM	Dennis (red card) 44'; Pelayo 80'	Report	Erofeev 45+3'	Stadium: Phoenix Rising Soccer Stadium; Attendance: 4,530; Referee: Matthew Corrigan

May 23, 2026 10	Tampa Bay Rowdies	3–0	Phoenix Rising FC	St. Petersburg, Florida
	Dolabella 2'; Myers 28'; Perez 33'	Report		Stadium: Al Lang Stadium; Attendance: 5,776; Referee: Elton García

May 30, 2026 11	Phoenix Rising FC	2–0	Sacramento Republic FC	Phoenix, Arizona
7:30 PM	Sacko 39' (pen.), 45+4' (pen.)	Report		Stadium: Phoenix Rising Soccer Stadium; Attendance: 5,294; Referee: John Griggs

June 10, 2026 12	Phoenix Rising FC	0–2	Louisville City FC	Phoenix, Arizona
7:30 PM		Report	Akale 53'; Duncan 67'	Stadium: Phoenix Rising Soccer Stadium; Attendance: 3,174; Referee: Rodrigo Albuquerque

June 13, 2026 13	El Paso Locomotive FC	1–1	Phoenix Rising FC	El Paso, Texas
6:00 PM	Méndez 46'	Report	Scearce 70'	Stadium: Southwest University Park; Attendance: 5,033; Referee: Brandon Stevis

June 20, 2026 14	Phoenix Rising FC	3–4	Oakland Roots SC	Phoenix, Arizona
7:30 PM	Sacko 62' (pen.); Gómez 72'; Arase 90'; Biasi (red card) 90+10'	Report	Wilson 49' (pen.), 78'; Trejo 56', (red card) 90+10'; Valot 74'	Stadium: Phoenix Rising Soccer Stadium; Attendance: 3,740; Referee: Ricardo Fierro

July 4, 2026 15	Colorado Springs Switchbacks FC	3–1	Phoenix Rising FC	Colorado Springs, Colorado
6:00 PM	Perez 34', 79'; Metusala 48'	Report	Studenthofft 4'	Stadium: Weidner Field; Attendance: 7,024; Referee: Nabil Bensalah

July 18, 2026 16	Phoenix Rising FC	3–2	Monterey Bay FC	Phoenix, Arizona
7:30 PM	Badji 30'; Arase 78'; Nakamura 84' (o.g.)	Report	Saidi 42'; Scearce 52' (o.g.)	Stadium: Phoenix Rising Soccer Stadium; Referee: Ekaterina Koroleva

July 25, 2026 17	Phoenix Rising FC	0–0	Hartford Athletic	Phoenix, Arizona
7:30 PM		Report		Stadium: Phoenix Rising Soccer Stadium; Attendance: 3,380; Referee: Corbyn May

August 1, 2026 18	Las Vegas Lights FC	1–1	Phoenix Rising FC	Las Vegas, Nevada
7:30 PM	Antonoglou 2'	Report	Ofeimu 42' (o.g.)	Stadium: Cashman Field; Referee: Atahan Yaya

August 8, 2026 19	Lexington SC	1–0	Phoenix Rising FC	Lexington, Kentucky
4:00 PM	Rodrigues 63'	Report	Biasi (red card) 85'	Stadium: Lexington SC Stadium; Attendance: 5,306; Referee: Abdou Ndiaye

August 19, 2026 20	Phoenix Rising FC	3–1	Colorado Springs Switchbacks FC	Phoenix, Arizona
7:30 PM	Sacko 35'; Mahoney 72' (o.g.); Studenthofft 90+1'; Rivera (yellow card) 27'; Scearce (yellow card) 82'	Report	Perez 45+2'; Lacroix (yellow card) 44'; Tejada (yellow card) 60'	Stadium: Phoenix Rising Soccer Stadium; Attendance: 3,504; Referee: Matthew Thompson

August 22, 2026 21	Sacramento Republic FC	2–2	Phoenix Rising FC	Sacramento, California
7:00 PM	Wolff 19'; Rodríguez 26'; Crisostomo (yellow card) 48'	Report	Sacko 45', 85'; Smith (yellow card) 76'; Biasi (yellow card) 90+6'	Stadium: Heart Health Park; Attendance: 9,788; Referee: Amin Hadzic

August 29, 2026 22	Phoenix Rising FC	2–1	Indy Eleven	Phoenix, Arizona
7:30 PM	Badji 5'; Flores 28'	Report	Boye 7' (o.g.)	Stadium: Phoenix Rising Soccer Stadium; Attendance: 6,127; Referee: Benjamin Meyer

September 5, 2026 23	Monterey Bay FC	1–1	Phoenix Rising FC	Seaside, California
7:00 PM	Nakamura 88'	Report	Flores 79'	Stadium: Cardinale Stadium; Attendance: 3,648; Referee: Elton García

September 12, 2026 24	Phoenix Rising FC	2–1	FC Tulsa	Phoenix, Arizona
7:30 PM	Badji 6'; Studenthofft 88'	Report	Pierre 90+4'	Stadium: Phoenix Rising Soccer Stadium; Attendance: 6,191; Referee: Muhammad Hassan

September 19, 2026 25	Phoenix Rising FC	1–3	El Paso Locomotive FC	Phoenix, Arizona
7:30 PM	Czichos 41'; Biasi (yellow card) 78' (yellow-red card) 80'	Report	Rubín 11', 90+6'; Calvillo 51'	Stadium: Phoenix Rising Soccer Stadium; Attendance: 7,061; Referee: Servando Berna Rico

September 26, 2026 26	Oakland Roots SC	3–0	Phoenix Rising FC	Oakland, California
7:00 PM	Lapa 7'; Trejo 22'; Jacquesson 71'	Report		Stadium: Oakland Coliseum; Attendance: 5,240; Referee: Edson Carvajal

October 3, 2026 27	New Mexico United	2–1	Phoenix Rising FC	Albuquerque, New Mexico
6:00 PM	Hurst 5'; Wilkerson 81'	Report	Arase 72'	Stadium: Isotopes Park; Attendance: 8,958; Referee: Ekaterina Koroleva

October 10, 2026 28	Phoenix Rising FC	3–2	Las Vegas Lights FC	Phoenix, Arizona
7:30 PM	Sacko 24', 45+9' (pen.); Studenthofft 30'	Report	Leal 77'; Anderson 85'	Stadium: Phoenix Rising Soccer Stadium; Attendance: 6,238; Referee: Erick Lezama

October 17, 2026 29	Orange County SC	1–3	Phoenix Rising FC	Irvine, California
7:00 PM	Bazini 76'	Report	Boye 10'; Sacko 19', 58'	Stadium: Championship Soccer Stadium; Attendance: 6,500; Referee: Matthew Corrigan

October 24, 2026 30	Phoenix Rising FC	3–3	Lexington SC	Phoenix, Arizona
7:30 PM	Sacko 10'; Studenthofft 29'; Goodrum 53' (o.g.)	Report	Goodrum 45+1'; Rodrigues 65'; Molloy 77'	Stadium: Phoenix Rising Soccer Stadium; Attendance: 7,522; Referee: Nabil Bensalah

=== Group table ===
Pos	Team	Pld	W	L	T	GF	GA	GD	Pts	Qualification
6	San Antonio FC	30	11	7	12	32	30	+2	45	Playoffs
7	FC Tulsa	30	11	9	10	34	31	+3	43	Playoffs
8	Phoenix Rising FC	30	11	10	9	45	46	−1	42	Playoffs
9	Orange County SC	30	10	11	9	39	49	−10	39	
10	Oakland Roots SC	30	9	10	11	39	40	−1	38	

Updated to match(es) played on October 24, 2026. Source: USL Championship Standings
Rules for classification: 1) total wins against conference opponents; 2) goal differential against conference opponents; 3) goals scored against conference opponents; 4) head-to-head points against conference opponents; 5) points per game against conference opponents; 6) points per game against non-conference opponents; 7) fewest disciplinary points; 8) coin toss or drawing of lots

=== USL Championship playoffs ===
As the eighth seed in the Western Conference, Phoenix qualified for the playoffs, matched up away against first seeded New Mexico United. Away from home, Phoenix fell in a shutout loss to New Mexico where two players ended up with red cards, ending their season.

November 1 Conference Quarter-finals	New Mexico United	2–0	Phoenix Rising FC	Albuquerque, New Mexico
8:32 PM ET	Hurst 7'; LaCava 48' (yellow card) 63'	Report	Studenhofft (yellow card) 10' (yellow-red card) 75'; Moursou (red card) 52'; Kah (yellow card) 52'; Scearce (yellow card) 59'	Stadium: Rio Grande Credit Union Field at Isotopes Park; Attendance: 9,413; Referee: Muhammad Hassan

=== US Open Cup ===
Phoenix Rising entered the 2026 US Open Cup at home against San Ramon FC, an amateur club from California that plays in the United Premier Soccer League. Following an easy route of San Ramon, Phoenix Rising was matched up away against Orange County SC, who also plays in the USL Championship. Following an added extra time victory, Phoenix was scheduled away in San Jose against first-division MLS club San Jose Earthquakes.

March 17 First Round	(Arizona) Phoenix Rising FC (USLC)	4–0	(California) San Ramon FC (LFC)	Phoenix, Arizona
10:00 PM ET	Avayevu 15'; Carvajal 45+2'; Vukovic 90'; Hernandez 90+4'	Report		Stadium: Phoenix Rising Soccer Stadium; Attendance: 2,274; Referee: Edgar Sanchez Beltran

April 1 Second Round	(California) Orange County SC (USLC)	1–2 (a.e.t.)	(Arizona) Phoenix Rising FC (USLC)	Irvine, California
10:00 p.m. ET	Sylla 85'	Report	Studenthofft 35'; Vukovic 96'	Stadium: Championship Soccer Stadium; Referee: Mark Verso

April 15 Round of 32	(California) San Jose Earthquakes (MLS)	2–0	(Arizona) Phoenix Rising FC (USLC)	San Jose, California
10:00 p.m. EST	Fernandez 3'; Jasinski 23'	Report		Stadium: PayPal Park; Attendance: 7,868; Referee: Elton García

=== USL Cup ===
Phoenix Rising participated in the third edition of the USL Cup, the second edition which will have inter-league competition between the USL Championship and the USL League One.

April 25, 2026	Phoenix Rising FC	0–1	Colorado Springs Switchbacks FC	Phoenix, Arizona
7:00 PM	De La Cruz (yellow card) 14'; Moursou (yellow card) 37'; Studenthofft (yellow card) 49'	Report	Foster 26'; Rocha (yellow card) 36'; Williams (yellow card) 61'; Fjellberg (yellow card) 73'; Hanya (yellow card) 90+4'	Stadium: Phoenix Rising Soccer Stadium; Attendance: 7,002; Referee: Trevor Wiseman

May 16, 2026	Phoenix Rising FC	2–1	Orange County SC	Phoenix, Arizona
7:00 PM	Moursou 28'; Ramirez 68'	Report	Johnson 22'	Stadium: Phoenix Rising Stadium at 38th St/Washington; Attendance: 5,527; Referee: Matthew Thompson

June 6, 2026	New Mexico United	4–0	Phoenix Rising FC	Albuquerque, New Mexico
7:30 PM	Reid-Stephen 45+1'; Jabang 53'; Noël 70'; Harri 85'	Report		Stadium: Rio Grande Credit Union Field at Isotopes Park; Attendance: 9,389; Referee: Brad Jensen

July 11, 2026	AV Alta FC	2–1	Phoenix Rising FC	Lancaster, California
8:00 PM	Aoumaich 12' (pen.); Bahena Jr. 32'	Report	Studenhofft 71'	Stadium: Lancaster Municipal Stadium; Attendance: 2,911; Referee: Ivan de Cristofaro

=== Group 2 table ===
Pos	Lg	Team	Pld	W	PKW	PKL	L	GF	GA	GD	Pts	Qualification
1	USLC	Colorado Springs Switchbacks FC	4	4	0	0	0	10	1	+9	12	Advance to knockout stage
2	USLC	New Mexico United	4	3	0	0	1	8	5	+3	9	
3	USLC	El Paso Locomotive FC	4	2	0	0	2	5	5	0	6	
4	USL1	AV Alta FC	4	2	0	0	2	5	6	−1	6	
5	USLC	Phoenix Rising FC	4	1	0	0	3	3	8	−5	3	
6	USLC	Orange County SC	4	0	0	0	4	3	9	−6	0	

== Roster ==
As of August 5, 2025

Note: Flags indicate national team as defined under FIFA eligibility rules; some limited exceptions apply. Players may hold more than one non-FIFA nationality.

No.	Pos.	Nation	Player
1	GK	GER	Patrick Rakovsky
2	DF	USA	Collin Smith
3	DF	IRL	Harvey Neville
4	DF	SEN	Pape Mar Boye
5	DF	SEN	Mohamed Traore
6	MF	HAI	Carl Sainté (on loan from FC Dallas)
8	MF	CAN	Noble Okello
9	FW	FRA	Ihsan Sacko
10	MF	GHA	Hope Avayevu
12	MF	ENG	Charlie Dennis
13	GK	CAN	Triston Henry
14	MF	ARG	Emil Cuello

No.	Pos.	Nation	Player
15	DF	USA	Alex Araneda
17	MF	USA	JP Scearce
19	FW	GUA	Damian Rivera
22	FW	GRN	Darius Johnson
23	DF	USA	Ryan Flood
29	FW	POL	Dariusz Formella
44	MF	USA	Jamison Ping
51	DF	CMR	Ascel Essengue (on loan from LA Galaxy)
70	MF	ITA	Giulio Doratiotto
80	MF	BEL	Xian Emmers
87	DF	USA	Daniel Flores (on loan from Guadalajara)
91	FW	FRA	Rémi Cabral

1. USL Academy Contract

=== Out on loan ===
Note: Flags indicate national team as defined under FIFA eligibility rules; some limited exceptions apply. Players may hold more than one non-FIFA nationality.

No.	Pos.	Nation	Player
72	DF	VEN	Edgardo Rito (on loan to Caracas FC)
