= 2026 USL Championship season =

16th season the USL Championship

USL Championship
- Season: 2026
- Dates: March 7 – October 24 (regular season); October 30 – November 20–22 (playoffs)
- Champions: Sacramento Republic FC
- Players' Shield: Tampa Bay Rowdies
- Matches: 308
- Goals: 839 (2.72 per match)
- Top goalscorer: (France) Ihsan Sacko (Phoenix Rising FC) (17 goals)
- Biggest home win: Lexington SC 6–0 Orange County SC September 19
- Biggest away win: Hartford Athletic 0–4 El Paso Locomotive FC April 11; Sporting JAX 2–6 Detroit City FC June 13; Orange County SC 1–5 FC Tulsa August 22
- Highest scoring: Tampa Bay Rowdies 5–4 Louisville City FC August 1 Loudoun United FC 4–5 Colorado Springs Switchbacks FC September 4
- Longest winning run: El Paso Locomotive FC (August 5 – Present); 8 games
- Longest unbeaten run: Tampa Bay Rowdies 12 games (March 7 – June 10)
- Longest winless run: Sporting Jax 15 games (March 7 – July 3)
- Longest losing run: Sporting Jax 7 games (March 25 – May 9)
- Highest attendance: 14,847 New Mexico United 2–1 Oakland Roots SC July 4
- Lowest attendance: 446 Sporting Jax 2–5 Charleston Battery June 27
- Total attendance: 1,553,174
- Average attendance: 5,092

The 2026 USL Championship season is the 16th season of the USL Championship and the ninth season under Division II sanctioning.

Before the start of the season, the United Soccer League Players Association (USLPA) authorized a player strike, pending resolution of ongoing labor negotiations between the league and the association. An agreement on a CBA running through 2030 was finally reached in May 2026, ending the player protests.

25 teams in two conferences competed in the regular season. The Brooklyn FC men's team, which was originally scheduled to begin play in 2025, debuted in 2026 alongside Sporting Club Jacksonville. North Carolina FC dropped out of the USL Championship and went on hiatus following the 2025 season, with hopes of entering USL Premier in 2028 with a new stadium in Raleigh.

All 25 teams participated in the Prinx Tires USL Cup alongside the 18 USL League One teams.

The Pittsburgh Riverhounds were the defending league champions, and Louisville City FC are the defending Players' Shield winners.

Sacramento Republic FC defeated Louisville City FC in the final 4–3 on penalties to win their second title.

== Teams ==
Locations of teams for the 2026 USL Championship season
Western Conference Eastern Conference

=== Changes from 2025 ===
Expansion clubs

- Brooklyn FC
- Sporting Club Jacksonville

Departing clubs

- North Carolina FC

=== Stadiums and locations ===
Team	Stadium	Capacity
Birmingham Legion FC	Protective Stadium	47,000
Brooklyn FC	Maimonides Park	7,000
Charleston Battery	Patriots Point Soccer Complex	5,000
Colorado Springs Switchbacks FC	Weidner Field	8,000
Detroit City FC	Keyworth Stadium	7,933
El Paso Locomotive FC	Southwest University Park	9,500
FC Tulsa	ONEOK Field	7,833
Hartford Athletic	Trinity Health Stadium	5,500
Indy Eleven	IU Michael A. Carroll Track & Soccer Stadium	10,524
Las Vegas Lights FC	Cashman Field	9,334
Lexington SC	Lexington SC Stadium	7,500
Loudoun United FC	Segra Field	5,000
Louisville City FC	Lynn Family Stadium	15,304
Miami FC	Pitbull Stadium	25,000
Monterey Bay FC	Cardinale Stadium	6,000
New Mexico United	Rio Grande Credit Union Field at Isotopes Park	13,500
Oakland Roots SC	Oakland Coliseum	53,200 (15,000)
Orange County SC	Championship Soccer Stadium	5,000
Phoenix Rising FC	Phoenix Rising Soccer Stadium	10,000
Pittsburgh Riverhounds SC	F.N.B. Stadium	5,000
Rhode Island FC	Centreville Bank Stadium	10,500
Sacramento Republic FC	Heart Health Park	11,569
San Antonio FC	Toyota Field	8,296
Sporting Club Jacksonville	Hodges Stadium	12,000
Tampa Bay Rowdies	Al Lang Stadium	7,227

1. Non-soccer specific stadium.
2. Soccer seating capacity.

=== Personnel and sponsorships ===
Team	Head coach	Captain(s)	Kit manufacturer	Kit sponsor
Birmingham Legion FC	(United States) Jay Heaps	(Rwanda) Phanuel Kavita	Hummel	Coca-Cola
Brooklyn FC	(United States) Marlon LeBlanc	(United States) Thomas McNamara	New Balance	Electrolit
Charleston Battery	(United States) Ben Pirmann	(United States) Emilio Ycaza	Hummel	Mercedes-Benz Vans Charleston
Colorado Springs Switchbacks FC	(Republic of Ireland) Alan McCann	(United States) Matt Mahoney	Capelli Sport	CommonSpirit Health
Detroit City FC	(England) Danny Dichio	(United States) Devon Amoo-Mensah	Adidas	AlumniFi
El Paso Locomotive FC	(United States) Junior Gonzalez	(Mexico) Arturo Ortiz	Hummel	Southwest University at El Paso
FC Tulsa	(United States) Luke Spencer	(France) Abdoulaye Cissoko	Hummel	Williams
Hartford Athletic	(United States) Brendan Burke	(Jamaica) Jordan Scarlett	Hummel	Trinity Health of New England
Indy Eleven	(England) Sean McAuley	(United States) Aodhan Quinn	Under Armour	Ford
Las Vegas Lights FC	(United States) Devin Rensing	(United States) Christian Pinzón	Joma	
Lexington SC	(Japan) Masaki Hemmi	(United States) Kendall Burks	Hummel	UK HealthCare Sports Medicine
Loudoun United FC	(Australia) Anthony Limbrick	(United States) Jacob Erlandson	Capelli Sport	CORAS
Louisville City FC	(United States) Danny Cruz	(New Zealand) Kyle Adams	Puma	GE Appliances
Miami FC	(Argentina) Gastόn Maddoni	(United States) Daltyn Knutson	Macron	Avianca
Monterey Bay FC	(England) Jordan Stewart	(Montserrat) Nico Gordon	Charly	Montage Health
New Mexico United	(United States) Dennis Sanchez	(United States) Will Seymore	Puma	Meow Wolf (home); Sandia Resort and Casino (away)
Oakland Roots SC	(United States) Ryan Martin	(United States) Tyler Gibson, (United States) Tommy McCabe	Charly	Anthem
Orange County SC	(England) Danny Stone	(England) Tom Brewitt	Hummel	Hoag
Phoenix Rising FC	(Norway) Pa-Modou Kah	(Senegal) Pape Mar Boye	Adidas	Carvana
Pittsburgh Riverhounds SC	(England) Rob Vincent	(United States) Danny Griffin	Hummel	Allegheny Health Network (home); 84 Lumber (away)
Rhode Island FC	(Bermuda) Khano Smith	(Spain) Koke Vegas	Capelli Sport	Breeze Airways
Sacramento Republic FC	(Scotland) Neill Collins	(Republic of Ireland) Lee Desmond	Hummel	UCDavis Health
San Antonio FC	(United States) Carlos Llamosa	(United States) Mitchell Taintor	Charly	Community First Health Plans
Sporting Club Jacksonville	(Scotland) Liam Fox	(England) Kieran Sadlier	Adidas	Ascension St. Vincent's
Tampa Bay Rowdies	(Scotland) Dominic Casciato	(England) Lewis Hilton	Charly	Union Home Mortgage

== Regular season ==
=== Format ===
The teams will play an unbalanced 30-game schedule plus four USL Cup games. Each team will play its conference opponents twice, home and away, and five or six of the teams in the opposite conference. The top eight teams in each conference will make the playoffs.

=== Eastern Conference ===
Pos	Team	Pld	W	L	T	GF	GA	GD	Pts	Qualification
1	Tampa Bay Rowdies (S)	30	18	5	7	52	26	+26	61	Playoffs
2	Charleston Battery	30	16	9	5	56	35	+21	53	Playoffs
3	Detroit City FC	30	14	7	9	34	21	+13	51	Playoffs
4	Louisville City FC	30	13	9	8	51	43	+8	47	Playoffs
5	Pittsburgh Riverhounds SC	30	13	11	6	33	30	+3	45	Playoffs
6	Hartford Athletic	30	10	7	13	35	33	+2	43	Playoffs
7	Rhode Island FC	30	12	12	6	42	33	+9	42	Playoffs
8	Miami FC	30	9	12	9	39	49	−10	36	Playoffs
9	Indy Eleven	30	9	14	7	35	41	−6	34	
10	Birmingham Legion FC	30	6	12	12	40	46	−6	30	
11	Loudoun United FC	30	6	11	13	40	46	−6	31	
12	Brooklyn FC	30	5	19	6	34	63	−29	21	
13	Sporting Club Jacksonville	30	3	22	5	32	78	−46	14	

Updated to match(es) played on October 24, 2026. Source: USL Championship Standings
Rules for classification: 1) total wins against conference opponents; 2) goal differential against conference opponents; 3) goals scored against conference opponents; 4) head-to-head points against conference opponents; 5) points per game against conference opponents; 6) points per game against non-conference opponents; 7) fewest disciplinary points; 8) coin toss or drawing of lots
(S) Players' Shield winner

=== Western Conference ===
Pos	Team	Pld	W	L	T	GF	GA	GD	Pts	Qualification
1	New Mexico United	30	15	8	7	45	34	+11	52	Playoffs
2	Sacramento Republic FC (C)	30	13	5	12	42	28	+14	51	Playoffs
3	El Paso Locomotive FC	30	15	10	5	48	38	+10	50	Playoffs
4	Lexington SC	30	14	10	6	57	39	+18	48	Playoffs
5	Colorado Springs Switchbacks FC	30	13	9	8	44	38	+6	47	Playoffs
6	San Antonio FC	30	11	7	12	32	30	+2	45	Playoffs
7	FC Tulsa	30	11	9	10	34	31	+3	43	Playoffs
8	Phoenix Rising FC	30	11	10	9	45	46	−1	42	Playoffs
9	Orange County SC	30	10	11	9	39	49	−10	39	
10	Oakland Roots SC	30	9	10	11	39	40	−1	38	
11	Las Vegas Lights FC	30	10	14	6	41	48	−7	36	
12	Monterey Bay FC	30	6	18	6	32	52	−20	24	

Updated to match(es) played on October 24, 2026. Source: USL Championship Standings
Rules for classification: 1) total wins against conference opponents; 2) goal differential against conference opponents; 3) goals scored against conference opponents; 4) head-to-head points against conference opponents; 5) points per game against conference opponents; 6) points per game against non-conference opponents; 7) fewest disciplinary points; 8) coin toss or drawing of lots
(C) Champions

== Playoffs ==
=== Bracket ===
Conference Quarterfinals; October 30-November 1	Conference Semifinals; November 7
E1	Tampa Bay Rowdies	1 (4)
E8	Miami FC (p)	1 (5)
E4	Louisville City FC	3
E8	Miami FC	2
E4	Louisville City FC (a.e.t.)	1
E5	Pittsburgh Riverhounds SC	0
Eastern Conference
E3	Detroit City FC	1
E6	Hartford Athletic	2
E2	Charleston Battery (p)	3 (5)
E6	Hartford Athletic	3 (4)
E2	Charleston Battery (p)	1 (5)
E7	Rhode Island FC	1 (4)
W1	New Mexico United	2
W8	Phoenix Rising FC	0
W1	New Mexico United	4
W5	Colorado Springs Switchbacks FC	0
W4	Lexington SC	1 (4)
W5	Colorado Springs Switchbacks FC (p)	1 (5)
Western Conference
W3	El Paso Locomotive FC	2
W6	San Antonio FC	1
W2	Sacramento Republic FC	2
W3	El Paso Locomotive FC	1
W2	Sacramento Republic FC	1
W7	FC Tulsa	0

Conference Finals; November 14–15
E2	Charleston Battery	0
E4	Louisville City FC	2
W1	New Mexico United	1
W2	Sacramento Republic FC (a.e.t.)	2

USL Championship Final; November 21
W2	Sacramento Republic FC (p)	1 (4)
E4	Louisville City FC	1 (3)

=== Conference Quarterfinals ===
October 30 East	Louisville City FC	1–0 (a.e.t.)	Pittsburgh Riverhounds SC	Louisville, Kentucky
6:30 PM ET	Niang (yellow card) 16'; Lambert (yellow card) 79'; McFadden (yellow card) 89'; Showunmi 105+1'	Report	Goldthorp (yellow card) 90+4'; Kelp (yellow card) 113'	Stadium: Lynn Family Stadium; Attendance: 7,438; Referee: Abdou Ndiaye

October 30 East	Charleston Battery	1–1 (a.e.t.) (5–4 p)	Rhode Island FC	Mount Pleasant, South Carolina
7:00 PM ET	Houssou (yellow card) 45'; Berry (yellow card) 45+1' (goal) 90+5'; Foster (yellow card) 51'; Ycaza (yellow card) 90+8'; Pirmann (yellow card) 95'; Zamudio (yellow card) 109'	Report	Kwizera (yellow card) 12' (goal) 28'; Bacharach (yellow card) 45+3'; Afonso (yellow card) 74'; Shapiro-Thompson (yellow card) 90+3'; Vegas (yellow card) 90'; Nodarse (yellow card) 120'	Stadium: Patriots Point Soccer Complex; Attendance: 3,530; Referee: Matthew Thompson
	Penalties
	Berry (penalty scored); Suber (penalty scored); Ycaza (penalty scored); Smith (penalty missed); Kissiedou (penalty scored); Kelly (penalty scored)		(penalty scored) Kwizera; (penalty scored) Tsukada; (penalty scored) Yao; (penalty missed) Bacharach; (penalty scored) Vegas; (penalty missed) Rodríguez

October 30 East	Tampa Bay Rowdies	1–1 (a.e.t.) (4–5 p)	Miami FC	St. Petersburg, Florida
7:30 PM ET	Myers 44'; Ostrem (yellow card) 54'; Wyke (yellow card) 69'; Dolabella (yellow card) 87'; Dossantos (yellow card) 101'	Report	Romero 34' (yellow card) 81'; Soñora (yellow card) 45+3'; da Costa (yellow card) 45+8'; Tori (yellow card) 88'; Rocha (yellow card) 90+3'; Díaz (yellow card) 95'; Al-Zubaidi (yellow card) 105'; Knutson (yellow card) 120+1'	Stadium: Al Lang Stadium; Attendance: 5,448; Referee: Matthew Corrigan
	Penalties
	Myers (penalty scored); Dolabella (penalty missed); Schneider (penalty scored); Perez (penalty scored); Vivi (penalty scored); Ostrem (penalty missed)		(penalty scored) Knutson; (penalty scored) Tunbridge; (penalty scored) Rogers; (penalty scored) Rocha; (penalty missed) Díaz; (penalty scored) Tori

October 30 East	Detroit City FC	1–2	Hartford Athletic	Hamtramck, Michigan
8:00 PM ET	Hernandez-Foster (red card) 19'; Dichio (yellow card) 25'; Amoo-Mensah 45'	Report	Anaku 33', 75'	Stadium: Keyworth Stadium; Attendance: 7,027; Referee: Elton Garcia

October 30 West	El Paso Locomotive FC	2–1	San Antonio FC	El Paso, Texas
9:00 PM ET	Rubín 14'; Twumasi (yellow card) 20'; Ortiz (yellow card) 34'; Ruiz (yellow card) 45'; Avila (yellow card) 45'; Alfaro 54' (yellow card) 74'; Dollenmayer (yellow card) 88'; Coronado (yellow card) 90+2'	Report	Patiño (yellow card) 30'; Berrón (yellow card) 37'; Crognale (yellow card) 65'; Pacheco 84'; Hernández (yellow card) 90+4'	Stadium: Southwest University Park; Attendance: 4,078; Referee: Jeremy Scheer

November 1 West	Lexington SC	1–1 (a.e.t.) (4–5 p)	Colorado Springs Switchbacks FC	Lexington, Kentucky
2:00 PM ET	Goodrum 12' (pen.); Brown (yellow card) 56'; Greene (yellow card) 92'; Tschantret (yellow card) 96'; Rodrigues (yellow card) 111'	Report	Bennett 78' (pen.); Creek (yellow card) 117'	Stadium: Lexington SC Stadium; Attendance: 4,909; Referee: Brandon Stevis
	Penalties
	Molloy (penalty scored); Rodrigues (penalty scored); Goodrum (penalty scored); Epps (penalty scored); Okello (penalty missed)		(penalty scored) Tejada; (penalty scored) Hanya; (penalty scored) Amoh; (penalty scored) Maples; (penalty scored) Bennett

November 1 West	New Mexico United	2–0	Phoenix Rising FC	Albuquerque, New Mexico
8:32 PM ET	Hurst 7'; LaCava 48' (yellow card) 63'	Report	Studenhofft (yellow card) 10' (yellow-red card) 75'; Moursou (red card) 52'; Kah (yellow card) 52'; Scearce (yellow card) 59'	Stadium: Rio Grande Credit Union Field at Isotopes Park; Attendance: 9,413; Referee: Muhammad Hassan

November 1 West	Sacramento Republic FC	1–0	FC Tulsa	Sacramento, California
9:00 PM ET	Midence (yellow card) 43'; Crisostomo (yellow card) 61'; Kaye (yellow card) 83'; Willey 88'; Edwards (yellow card) 89'	Report	Wilson (yellow card) 45+2'	Stadium: Heart Health Park; Attendance: 10,338; Referee: Ekaterina Koroleva

=== Conference Semifinals ===
November 7 East	Louisville City FC	3–2	Miami FC	Louisville, Kentucky
6:00 PM ET	Donovan 79'; Serrano 90'; Showunmi 90+7'	Report	Rocha 19' (yellow card) 90+8'; Tori 32' (yellow card) 58'; Rogers (yellow card) 61'	Stadium: Lynn Family Stadium; Attendance: 10,148; Referee: Calin Radosav

November 7 East	Charleston Battery	3–3 (a.e.t.) (5–4 p)	Hartford Athletic	Mount Pleasant, South Carolina
6:30 PM ET	Ycaza 79' (pen.); Swan 83'; Pakhomov 90+7' (yellow card) 90+8'; Smith (yellow card) 95'	Report	Ngalina 13'; Coffey 16'; Moreira (yellow card) 20'; Anaku 31'; Siaha (yellow card) 80'; Burke (yellow card) 88'	Stadium: Patriots Point Soccer Complex; Attendance: 5,228; Referee: Brandon Stevis
	Penalties
	Houssou (penalty scored); Berry (penalty scored); Pakhomov (penalty scored); Ycaza (penalty scored); Kelly (penalty scored)		(penalty scored) Presthus; (penalty scored) Scarlett; (penalty scored) Careaga; (penalty scored) Adedokun; (penalty missed) Williams

November 7 West	New Mexico United	4–0	Colorado Springs Switchbacks	Albuquerque, New Mexico
8:30 PM ET	Dennis 2' (yellow card) 49'; Hurst 29', 44'; Quiah 71'; Noël (yellow card) 80'	Report	Echevarria (red card) 90+2'; Masereka (yellow card) 90+4'; Foster (yellow card) 90+4'	Stadium: Rio Grande Credit Union Field at Isotopes Park; Attendance: 8,591; Referee: Joshua Encarnación

November 7 West	Sacramento Republic FC	2–1	El Paso Locomotive FC	Sacramento, California
9:00 PM ET	Jennings 14'; Benítez 57'; Malango (yellow card) 65'; Gurr (yellow card) 66'	Report	Mendez 21'	Stadium: Heart Health Park; Attendance: 11,569; Referee: Elton García

=== Conference Finals ===
November 14 East	Charleston Battery	0–2	Louisville City FC	Mount Pleasant, South Carolina
6:00 PM ET	Kissiedou (yellow card) 85'	Report	Serrano 9'; Perez 68'	Stadium: Patriots Point Soccer Complex; Attendance: 5,422; Referee: Nabil Bensalah

November 16 West	New Mexico United	1–2 (a.e.t.)	Sacramento Republic FC	Albuquerque, New Mexico
6:00 PM MST	Noël 52'; Timmer (yellow card) 62'	Report	Malango 71'; Edwards 102'	Stadium: Rio Grande Credit Union Field at Isotopes Park; Attendance: 12,178; Referee: Brad Jensen

=== USL Championship Final ===
November 21 Final	Sacramento Republic FC	1–1 (a.e.t.) (4–3 p)	Louisville City FC	Sacramento, California
9:00 AM PST	Jennings 14'; M. Rodriguez (yellow card) 98'	Report	Serrano 31'; Babacar Niang (yellow card) 33'	Stadium: Heart Health Park; Attendance: 11,569; Referee: Abdou Ndiaye
	Penalties
	M. Rodriguez (penalty scored); Desmond (penalty missed); Kaye (penalty scored); K. Edwards (penalty scored); Spaulding (penalty scored)		(penalty scored) Totsch; (penalty missed) E. Davila; (penalty scored) Serrano; (penalty missed) Showunmi; (penalty scored) Duncan

== Attendances ==
Pos	Team	Total	High	Low	Average	Change
1	Sacramento Republic FC	151,985	11,569	8,072	10,132	+3.4%
2	Louisville City FC	144,055	12,358	7,297	9,604	−1.5%
3	New Mexico United	136,381	14,847	6,187	9,092	−4.6%
4	Indy Eleven	129,557	9,627	7,331	8,637	−8.7%
5	Rhode Island FC	121,447	10,606	5,708	8,096	−9.2%
6	Colorado Springs Switchbacks FC	94,698	7,362	4,860	6,313	−12.8%
7	Detroit City FC	93,758	7,387	5,053	6,251	+0.4%
8	San Antonio FC	92,494	7,742	5,160	6,166	−3.1%
9	Oakland Roots SC	82,650	14,419	2,496	5,904	−29.5%
10	Pittsburgh Riverhounds SC	79,775	6,376	3,946	5,318	+7.1%
11	Phoenix Rising FC	79,064	7,522	3,174	5,271	+8.3%
12	El Paso Locomotive FC	77,438	6,822	3,274	5,163	−6.4%
13	Tampa Bay Rowdies	76,620	7,012	4,038	5,108	+4.1%
14	Lexington SC	71,866	8,277	3,303	4,791	+12.8%
15	Orange County SC	68,303	7,651	2,699	4,554	−0.5%
16	FC Tulsa	65,216	5,717	3,496	4,348	+36.9%
17	Charleston Battery	61,816	5,621	2,816	4,121	+4.5%
18	Birmingham Legion FC	52,168	5,084	828	3,478	−23.4%
19	Monterey Bay FC	48,243	4,615	2,421	3,446	+3.2%
20	Hartford Athletic	43,479	4,130	1,148	3,106	−36.8%
21	Las Vegas Lights FC	39,630	3,782	2,116	2,831	+1.0%
22	Brooklyn FC	28,294	4,500	628	2,021	n/a
23	Loudoun United FC	26,559	3,080	957	1,771	−24.1%
24	Sporting Club Jacksonville	24,205	10,357	446	1,614	n/a
25	Miami FC	10,671	1,439	606	889	−23.8%
	League total	1,901,832	14,847	446	5,182	−6.8%

Updated to games played on 25 October 2026.
Source: https://www.backheeled.com/usl-attendance/

Percentage changes as compared to 2025 USL Championship season.

== Player statistics ==
As of October 24, 2026

=== Goals ===
Rank	Player	Club	Goals
1	(France) Ihsan Sacko	Phoenix Rising FC	17
2	(Guatemala) Rubio Rubín	El Paso Locomotive FC	16
3	(Liberia) Peter Wilson	Oakland Roots SC	15
3	(Jamaica) Khori Bennett	Colorado Springs Switchbacks FC	15
5	(South Africa) Darren Smith	Detroit City FC	14
6	(United States) MD Myers	Tampa Bay Rowdies	13
6	(United States) Phillip Goodrum	Lexington SC	13
8	(Scotland) Greg Hurst	New Mexico United	12
8	(United States) Johnny Rodriguez	Las Vegas Lights FC	12
10	(Saint Vincent and the Grenadines) Oalex Anderson	Las Vegas Lights FC	11

=== Hat-tricks ===
Player	Team	Against	Score	Date
(Liberia) Peter Wilson	Oakland Roots SC	Las Vegas Lights FC	4–2 (H)	April 22
(Curaçao) Jürgen Locadia	Miami FC	Louisville City FC	4–3 (H)	April 22
(South Africa) Darren Smith5	Detroit City FC	Sporting JAX	2–6 (A)	June 13
(United States) Trevor Amann	Pittsburgh Riverhounds SC	Louisville City FC	3–1 (H)	July 18
(Guatemala) Arquímides Ordóñez	FC Tulsa	Orange County SC	1–5 (A)	August 22
(Guatemala) Rubio Rubín	El Paso Locomotive FC	Loudoun United FC	4–1 (H)	August 29
(United States) Eddy Davis III	Loudoun United FC	Colorado Springs Switchbacks	4–5 (H)	September 4
(United States) Phillip Goodrum	Lexington SC	Oakland Roots SC	1–4 (A)	September 12
(United States) Phillip Goodrum	Lexington SC	Orange County SC	6–0 (H)	September 19
(United States) MD Myers	Tampa Bay Rowdies	Birmingham Legion FC	4–0 (H)	September 19
(United States) Ray Serrano	Louisville City FC	Indy Eleven	4–1 (H)	October 17

Notes

(H) – Home team
(A) – Away team

Scored five goals.

=== Assists ===
Rank	Player	Club	Assists
1	(United States) Christian Pinzón	Las Vegas Lights FC	10
2	(United States) Taylor Davila	Louisville City FC	9
2	(United States) Blaine Ferri	Lexington SC	9
2	(United States) Christopher Olney Jr.	Brooklyn FC	9
2	(United States) Memo Rodríguez	Sacramento Republic FC	9
2	(United States) Jeremy Kelly	Charleston Battery	9
7	(United States) Chris Donovan	Louisville City FC	8
7	(United States) Charlie Ostrem	Tampa Bay Rowdies	8
9	(England) Nathan Messer	Charleston Battery	7
9	(Mexico) Jorge Hernandez	San Antonio FC	7
9	(United States) Wolfgang Prentice	Oakland Roots SC	7

=== Clean sheets ===
Rank	Player	Club	Clean sheets
1	(Mexico) Carlos Herrera	Detroit City FC	14
2	(Jamaica) Jahmali Waite	Tampa Bay Rowdies	13
3	(United States) Joseph Batrouni	San Antonio FC	10
3	(United States) Danny Vitiello	Sacramento Republic FC	10
3	(Germany) Oliver Semmle	Lexington SC	10
6	(Cameroon) Antony Siaha	Hartford Athletic	9
6	(United States) Kris Shakes	New Mexico United	9
6	(Spain) Nico Campuzano	Pittsburgh Riverhounds SC	9
9	(United States) Dane Jacomen	FC Tulsa	8
10	(United States) Ethan Bandré	Loudoun United FC	7
10	(United States) Kendall McIntosh	Oakland Roots SC	7
10	(United States) Luis Zamudio	Charleston Battery	7
10	(Czech Republic) Jassem Koleilat	Birmingham Legion FC	7
10	(Spain) Koke Vegas	Rhode Island FC	7
10	(United States) Alex Rando	Orange County SC	7

== Awards ==
=== Individual awards ===
Award	Winner	Team	Reason	Ref.
Golden Boot	(France) Ihsan Sacko	Phoenix Rising FC	17 goals	
Golden Glove	(Mexico) Carlos Herrera	Detroit City FC	14 shutouts; 0.65 goals against average; 55 saves; -1.24 Goals Prevented	
Golden Playmaker	(United States) Christian Pinzón	Las Vegas Lights FC	10 assists	
Goalkeeper of the Year	(United States) Kris Shakes	New Mexico United	117 saves; 78.5% save percentage; -11.01 Goals Prevented	
Defender of the Year	(United States) Devon Amoo-Mensah	Detroit City FC	110 recoveries; 159 clearances; 24 blocked shots; completed 1,390 passes at an 84.5% accuracy rate	
Coach of the Year	(England) Dominic Casciato	Tampa Bay Rowdies	Players’ Shield winner; top three in both goals (52) and goals conceded (26); led the league in Expected Goals Against (28.71xGA)	
Young Player of the Year	(United States) Colton Swan	Charleston Battery	9 goals and 3 assists across 1,259 minutes; 32.1% shot conversion rate	
Player of the Year	(France) Ihsan Sacko	Phoenix Rising FC	17 goals and 5 assists in 28 appearances; averaging a goal every 135.6 minutes	

=== Midseason awards ===
Goalkeeper of the Year		Defender of the Year		Coach of the Year		Young Player of the Year		Player of the Year		References
(United States) Joey Batrouni	San Antonio FC	(United States) Michael Edwards	Oakland Roots SC	(England) Danny Stone	Orange County SC	(United States) CJ Olney	Brooklyn FC	(France) Ihsan Sacko	Phoenix Rising FC	

=== Monthly awards ===
Month	Player of the Month			Coach of the Month		References
Month	Player	Club	Position	Coach	Club	References
March	(Cameroon) Antony Siaha	Hartford Athletic	Goalkeeper	(England) Dominic Casciato	Tampa Bay Rowdies	
April	(United States) Wolfgang Prentice	Oakland Roots SC	Forward	(Republic of Ireland) Alan McCann	Colorado Springs Switchbacks	
May	(United States) Colton Swan	Charleston Battery	Forward	(England) Dominic Casciato	Tampa Bay Rowdies	
June	(United States) Emilio Ycaza	Charleston Battery	Midfielder	(United States) Ben Pirmann	Charleston Battery	
July	(Republic of Ireland) Aaron Molloy	Lexington SC	Midfielder	(Republic of Ireland) Alan McCann	Colorado Springs Switchbacks	
August	(Guatemala) Rubio Rubín	El Paso Locomotive FC	Forward	(United States) Junior Gonzalez	El Paso Locomotive FC	
September	(United States) Phillip Goodrum	Lexington SC	Forward	(United States) Brendan Burke	Hartford Athletic	
September	(France) Ihsan Sacko	Phoenix Rising FC	Forward	(United States) Simon Bird	Louisville City FC	

=== Weekly awards ===
Player of the Week
Week	Player	Club	Position	Reason	Ref.
1	(Guatemala) Rubio Rubín	El Paso Locomotive FC	Forward	2 goals vs Colorado Springs	
2	(United States) Jansen Wilson	Louisville City FC	Forward	1 goal, 1 assist vs Miami	
3	(United States) Emilio Ycaza	Charleston Battery	Midfielder	2 goals in comeback win vs Birmingham	
4	(Colombia) Arney Rocha	Miami FC	Forward	2 goals and 2 Assists in 6 point week for Miami	
5	(El Salvador) Amando Moreno	El Paso Locomotive FC	Forward	2 goals vs Las Vegas	
6	(United States) Markus Anderson	Brooklyn FC	Forward	1 goal, 2 Assists vs Charleston	
7	(Cameroon) Albert Dikwa	Pittsburgh Riverhounds SC	Forward	2 goals vs Detroit	
8/9	(Liberia) Peter Wilson	Oakland Roots SC	Forward	4 goals in 2 games including first Hat Trick	
10	(Spain) Nico Campuzano	Pittsburgh Riverhounds SC	Goalkeeper	7 save shutout vs Louisville City FC	
11/12	(Curaçao) Jürgen Locadia	Miami FC	Forward	Hat Trick vs Louisville City FC	
13	(El Salvador) Christian Sorto	San Antonio FC	Forward	2 goals vs Jacksonville	
14/15	(South Africa) Darren Smith	Detroit City FC	Forward	5 goals vs Jacksonville	
16	(Liberia) Peter Wilson	Oakland Roots SC	Forward	3 goals; 1 assist in 2 games	
17/18	(United States) Adrien Perez	Colorado Springs Switchbacks FC	Forward	2 goals; 1 assist vs Phoenix	
19/20	(United States) Trevor Amann	Pittsburgh Riverhounds SC	Forward	hat trick in 3 minutes, 27 seconds vs Louisville	
21	(Saint Vincent and the Grenadines) Kyle Edwards	Sacramento Republic FC	Forward	2 goals in win vs Oakland	
22	(United States) Russell Cicerone	Tampa Bay Rowdies	Forward	2 goals in comeback win vs Louisville	
23	(France) Valentin Noël	New Mexico United	Midfielder	2 goals 1 assist in 5–2 win vs Monterey Bay	
24	(United States) Alex Mendez	El Paso Locomotive FC	Forward	2 goals in 3–0 win vs San Antonio	
25	(Guatemala) Rubio Rubín	El Paso Locomotive FC	Forward	hat trick in 4–1 win vs Loudoun United	
26	(Guatemala) Arquímides Ordóñez	FC Tulsa	Forward	hat trick in 5–1 win vs Orange County	
27	(United States) Eddy Davis III	Loudoun United	Forward	hat trick in 5–4 loss vs Colorado Springs	
28	(United States) Phillip Goodrum	Lexington SC	Forward	hat trick in 4–1 win vs Oakland	
29	(United States) Phillip Goodrum	Lexington SC	Forward	hat trick in 6–0 win vs Orange County	
30	(United States) Memo Rodriguez	Sacramento Republic FC	Forward	2 goals, 1 assist 6–0 win vs New Mexico	
31	(Colombia) Arney Rocha	Miami FC	Forward	2 goals, 1 assist 4–1 win vs Jacksonville	
32	(France) Ihsan Sacko	Phoenix Rising FC	Forward	2 goals in 3–2 win vs Las Vegas	
33	(United States) Ray Serrano	Louisvile City FC	Forward	Hattrick in 4–1 win vs Indy	
34	(France) Ihsan Sacko	Phoenix Rising FC	Forward	1 goal; 1 assist in 3–3 draw vs Lexington	

Goal of the Week
Week	Player	Club	Opponent	Ref.
1	(Colombia) Wilmer Cabrera Jr.	Charleston Battery	Pittsburgh Riverhounds SC	
2	(France) Ihsan Sacko	Phoenix Rising FC	Orange County SC	
3	(United States) Owen Damm	FC Tulsa	Las Vegas Lights FC	
4	(United States) Sebastian Cruz	Tampa Bay Rowdies	Loudoun United FC	
5	(United States) Blake Willey	Sacramento Republic FC	Phoenix Rising FC	
6	(Iceland) Thorleifur Úlfarsson	Loudoun United FC	Louisville City FC	
7	(Uganda) Edward Kizza	Indy Eleven	Birmingham Legion FC	
8/9	(United States) Johnny Rodriguez	Las Vegas Lights FC	Lexington SC	
10	(United States) Tucker Lepley	Oakland Roots SC	El Paso Locomotive FC	
11/12	(Rwanda) Jojea Kwizera	Rhode Island FC	Brooklyn FC	
13	(United States) Tyshawn Rose	Sporting Club Jacksonville	Brooklyn FC	
14/15	(Brazil) Mattheus Oliveira	Tampa Bay Rowdies	Charleston Battery	
16	(Egypt) Abdellatif Aboukoura	Loudoun United	Birmingham Legion FC	
17/18	(Finland) Emil Jääskeläinen	Sporting JAX	Loudoun United FC	
19/20	(Ghana) Forster Ajago	Sacramento Republic FC	Charleston Battery	
21	(Italy) Marco Micaletto	Tampa Bay Rowdies	Miami FC	
22	(United States) Russell Cicerone	Tampa Bay Rowdies	Louisville City FC	
23	(Scotland) Greg Hurst	New Mexico United	Monterey Bay FC	
24	(France) Louis Perez	Tampa Bay Rowdies	Rhode Island FC	
25	(Haiti) Delentz Pierre	FC Tulsa	Orange County SC	
26	(Senegal) Dominique Badji	Phoenix Rising FC	Indy Eleven	
27	(United States) Daniel Flores	Phoenix Rising FC	Monterey Bay FC	
28	(Japan) Yutaro Tsukada	Rhode Island FC	Sporting Club Jacksonville	
29	(United States) Marcus Epps	Lexington SC	Orange County SC	
30	(Scotland) Greg Hurst	New Mexico United	Sacramento Republic FC	
31	(United States) Jordan Farr	Loudoun United	Indy Eleven	
32	(France) Ihsan Sacko	Phoenix Rising FC	Las Vegas Lights FC	
33	(United States) Sebastian Cruz	Tampa Bay Rowdies	Detroit City FC	
34	(France) Valentin Noël	New Mexico United	El Paso Locomotive FC	

Save of the Week
1	(Spain) Nico Campuzano	Pittsburgh Riverhounds SC	Charleston Battery
2	(United States) Chituru Odunze	Phoenix Rising FC	Orange County SC
3	(United States) Chituru Odunze	Phoenix Rising FC	Oakland Roots SC
4	(United States) Sebastián Mora-Mora	El Paso Locomotive FC	Sacramento Republic FC
5	(Curaçao) Eloy Room	Miami FC	Hartford Athletic
6	(Spain) Koke Vegas	Rhode Island FC	Lexington SC
7	(United States) Joey Batrouni	San Antonio FC	El Paso Locomotive FC
8/9	(United States) Danny Vitiello	Sacramento Republic FC	Orange County SC
10	(Spain) Nico Campuzano	Pittsburgh Riverhounds SC	Louisville City FC
11/12	(Australia) Jackson Lee	Brooklyn FC	Rhode Island FC
13	(Greece) Alex Tambakis	FC Tulsa	Las Vegas Lights FC
14/15	(United States) Danny Faundez	Louisville City FC	Brooklyn FC
16	(United States) Sebastián Mora-Mora	El Paso Locomotive FC	Monterey Bay FC
17/18	(Mexico) Carlos Herrera	Detroit City FC	Birmingham Legion FC
19/20	(United States) Danny Faundez	Louisville City FC	Pittsburgh Riverhounds SC
21	(Mexico) Abraham Romero	El Paso Locomotive FC	Sporting Club Jacksonville
22	(Curaçao) Eloy Room	Miami FC	Detroit City FC
23	(United States) Kendall McIntosh	Oakland Roots SC	Las Vegas Lights FC
24	(United States) Charlie Lanphier	Las Vegas Lights FC	Brooklyn FC
25	(Brazil) Pedro Cruz	El Paso Locomotive FC	Colorado Springs Switchbacks
26	(United States) Mike Sheridan	Pittsburgh Riverhounds SC	El Paso Locomotive FC
27	(United States) Kris Shakes	New Mexico United	Las Vegas Lights FC
28	(United States) Kendall McIntosh	Oakland Roots SC	Lexington SC
29	(Mexico) Christian Herrera	Colorado Springs Switchbacks	New Mexico United
30	(Spain) Koke Vegas	Rhode Island FC	Charleston Battery
31	(United States) Dane Jacomen	FC Tulsa	New Mexico United
32	(United States) Kendall McIntosh	Oakland Roots SC	San Antonio FC
33	(Spain) Nico Campuzano	Pittsburgh Riverhounds SC	Rhode Island FC
34	(Mexico) Christian Herrera	Colorado Springs Switchbacks	FC Tulsa

Team of the Week
Week	Goalkeeper	Defenders	Midfielders	Forwards	Bench	Coach	Ref.
1	(United States) Vitiello (SAC)	(United States) Foster (COS) (United States) Crognale (SAN) (United States) Kleeman (SAC) (United States) Real (HFD)	(Argentina) Careaga (HFD) (Germany) Schneider (TBR) (United States) Suber (CHS)	(Honduras) Obregón (BKN) (Guatemala) Rubín (ELP) (Argentina) Parano (SAN)	(Cameroon) Siaha (HFD) (Canada) Fisher (OAK) (United States) Spaulding (SAC) (Democratic Republic of the Congo) Ngalina (HFD) (United States) Pinzón (LVL) (Mexico) Hernandez (SAN) (United States) Akale (LOU)	(United States) Brendan Burke (HFD)	
2	(United States) Batrouni (SAN)	(United States) Amoo-Mensah (DET) (United States) McFadden (LOU) (Canada) Montgomery (DET)	(United States) Serrano (LOU) (United States) Mendez (ELP) (United States) Sample (PIT) (Uganda) Byaruhanga (OAK)	(South Africa) Smith (DET) (Cameroon) Dikwa (PIT) (United States) Wilson (LOU)	(Germany) Semmle (LEX) (United States) Benalcazar (OC) (Cuba) Nodarse (RI) (United States) Davila (LOU) (United States) Ahl (PIT) (United States) Donovan (LOU) (Ghana) Okyere (LVL)	(United States) Ryan Martin (OAK)	
3	(Cameroon) Siaha (HFD)	(Japan) Nishikawa (BKN) (United States) Barbir (SAN) (United States) S. Anderson (HFD)	(Cuba) Rendón (IND) (United States) Ycaza (CHS) (United States) Prentice (OAK) (United States) Damm (TUL)	(Mexico) Hernandez (SAN) (United States) Cicerone (TBR) (United States) Wilson (LOU)	(United States) Beaudry (LDN) (United States) Quinn (IND) (United States) Akpunonu (CHS) (Republic of Ireland) Coffey (HFD) (Rwanda) Kwizera (RI) (United States) M. Anderson (BKN) (United States) Myers (TBR)	(England) Dominic Casciato (TBR)	
4	(United States) Rodríguez (MIA)	(United States) Jabang (NMU) (United States) Totsch (LOU) (United States) Suárez (SAN)	(United States) Mendez (ELP) (France) Noël (NMU) (United States) Cruz (TBR) (United States) Ferri (LEX)	(Antigua and Barbuda) Harris (NMU) (Cameroon) Dikwa (PIT) (Colombia) Rocha (MIA)	(United States) Mora-Mora (ELP) (Cuba) Diz (HFD) (Mexico) Benítez (SAC) (El Salvador) Moreno (ELP) (Republic of Ireland) Molloy (LEX) (Jamaica) Bennett (COS) (Uganda) Anaku (HFD)	(Argentina) Gastón Maddoni (MIA)	
5	(United States) Dick (IND)	(United States) Zengue (LEX) (Cuba) Nodarse (RI) (United States) Suárez (SAN)	(Canada) Pasher (BHM) (Russia) Pakhomov (CHS) (United States) Pinzón (LVL) (United States) Murphy (LDN)	(Jamaica) Bennett (COS) (El Salvador) Moreno (ELP) (Barbados) Reid-Stephen (NMU)	(Cameroon) Siaha (HFD) (Canada) Dossantos (TBR) (Cuba) Diz (HFD) (United States) Griffin (PIT) (Germany) Schneider (TBR) (United States) Kelly (CHS) (United States) Willey (SAC)	(United States) Ben Pirmann (CHS)	
6	(United States) Rando (OC)	(Japan) Yamazaki (DET) (Mexico) Alfaro (ELP) (Trinidad and Tobago) Herbert (IND) (United States) Smart (LVL)	(United States) Murphy (LDN) (United States) Davila (LOU) (Scotland) Blake (IND)	(France) Sacko (PHX) (United States) Anderson (BKN) (Iceland) Úlfarsson (LDN)	(Australia) Lee (BRK) (United States) Dayes (LOU) (United States) Crognale (SAN) (United States) Scearce (PHX) (Uruguay) Tregarthen (BHM) (United States) Cicerone (TBR) (Switzerland) MacKinnon (OC)	(England) Danny Stone (OC)	
7	(Switzerland) Spiegel (OAK)	(England) Messer (CHS) (Cuba) Diz (HFD) (New Zealand) Adams (LOU) (United States) Damm (TUL)	(Mexico) Hernandez (SAN) (Canada) Pasher (BHM) (United States) Perez (COS)	(Cameroon) Dikwa (PGH) (France) Sacko (PHX) (Uganda) Masereka (COS)	(United States) Beaudry (LDN) (United States) Edwards (OAK) (United States) Crognale (SAN) (United States) Prentice (OAK) (United States) Ferri (LEX) (Jamaica) Bennett (COS) (Guatemala) Rubín (ELP)	(Republic of Ireland) Alan McCann (COS)	
8/9	(Jamaica) Waite (TBR)	(Mexico) Benítez (SAC) (Brazil) Ian (TUL) (United States) Prentice (OAK)	(Mexico) Hernandez (SAN) (United States) Kocevski (TUL) (Uruguay) Tregarthen (BHM) (Jamaica) Foster (CHS)	(Liberia) Wilson (OAK) (United States) Swan (CHS) (France) Cabral (TUL)	(United States) Beaudry (LDN) (England) Messer (CHS) (France) Jacquesson (OAK) (United States) Ferri (LEX) (Mexico) Rodríguez (SAC) (United States) Williams (RI) (Haiti) Damus (BHM)	(United States) Luke Spencer (TUL)	
10	(Spain) Campuzano (PGH)	(United States) Quinn (IND) (Spain) Ordoñez (LEX) (United States) Neidlinger (IND)	(Argentina) Careaga (HFD) (Brazil) Firmino (LEX) (United States) Hegardt (OC) (United States) Jabang (NMU)	(Scotland) Hurst (NMU) (United States) Goodrum (LEX) (Iceland) Úlfarsson (LDN)	(Jamaica) Waite (TBR) (Germany) Kelp (PIT) (Cuba) Diz (HFD) (Philippines) Bailey (NMU) (United States) Mendez (ELP) (Cuba) Rendón (IND) (Barbados) Reid-Stephen (NMU)	(Scotland) Sean McAuley (IND)	
11/12	(Greece) Tambakis (TUL)	(United States) Scardina (RI) (United States) Keller (NMU) (United States) Pope (LVL)	(Rwanda) Kwizera (RI) (Senegal) Sylla (OC) (Russia) Erofeev (SAN) (France) Perez (TBR)	(Curaçao) Locadia (MIA) (United States) Williams (RI) (United States) Myers (TBR)	(United States) Batrouni (SAN) (Japan) Yamazaki (DET) (Guyana) Glasgow (MB) (Republic of Ireland) Molloy (LEX) (Scotland) Blake (IND) (United States) Kelly (OC) (United States) Donovan (LOU)	(England) Dominic Casciato (TBR)	
13	(United States) Dick (IND)	(Spain) De Vicente (OAK) (El Salvador) Blanco (SAN) (Senegal) Mar Boye (PHX)	(England) Pedder (JAX) (Republic of Ireland) Molloy (LEX) (Germany) Schneider (TBR) (United States) Leggett (MB)	(France) Sacko (PHX) (El Salvador) Sorto (SAN) (New Zealand) Bidois (MB)	(United States) Vitiello (SAC) (United States) Barnes (PIT) (United States) Ostrem (TBR) (Brazil) Firmino (LEX) (Spain) Bacharach (RI) (United States) Swan (CHS) (Guatemala) Ordóñez (LOU)	(Norway) Pa-Modou Kah (PHX)	
14/15	(Cameroon) Siaha (HFD)	(Germany) Kelp (PIT) (United States) Scardina (RI) (United States) Barnes (PIT)	(United States) Ycaza (CHS) (United States) Hernandez-Foster (DET) (Australia) Duncan (LOU) (United States) Ferri (LEX)	(United States) Williams (RI) (South Africa) Smith (DET) (United States) Epps (LEX)	(United States) Vitiello (SAC) (United States) Anderson (HFD) (United States) Garcia (MB) (United States) Olney (BRK) (United States) Pinzón (LVL) (United States) Kelly (CHS) (United States) Hegardt (OC)	(United States) Ben Pirmann (CHS)	
16	(Spain) Campuzano (PIT)	(United States) Mahoney (COS) (Guyana) Glasgow (MB) (United States) Tubbs (OC)	(South Africa) Webber (TUL) (United States) Kuzain (JAX) (Scotland) Kelly (OC) (Norway) Fjeldberg (COS)	(Egypt) Aboukoura (LDN) (Liberia) Wilson (OAK) (Spain) Berry (CHS)	(United States) Shakes (NMU) (United States) Batista (TUL) (Uruguay) Tregarthen (BHM) (United States) Jabang (NMU) (France) Sacko (PHX) (Switzerland) MacKinnon (OC) (United States) Cicerone (TBR)	(United States) Ryan Martin (OAK)	
17/18	(Germany) Semmle (LEX)	(Haiti) Metusala (COS) (United States) Benalcazar (OC) (United States) Rasheed (IND)	(United States) Mendez (ELP) (Republic of Ireland) Molloy (CHS) (United States) Ycaza (CHS) (Philippines) Bailey (NMU)	(United States) Perez (COS) (Israel) Bazini (OC) (Finland) Jääskeläinen (JAX)	(United States) Batrouni (SAN) (United States) Rocha (COS) (Canada) Antonoglou (LVL) (Mexico) Hernandez (SAN) (United States) Shapiro-Thompson (RI) (Egypt) Aboukoura (LDN) (United States) Nava (NMU)	(United States) Dennis Sanchez (NMU)	
19/20	(Mexico) Herrera (DET)	(Cuba) Nodarse (RI) (United States) Batista (TUL) (United States) Stanley (DET)	(France) Noël (NMU) (United States) McNamara (BKN) (Republic of Ireland) Coffey (HFD) (Brazil) Mentzingen (DET)	(Scotland) Hurst (NMU) (United States) Amann (PIT) (Liberia) Melto (NMU)	(Curaçao) Room (MIA) (United States) Cruz (TBR) (South Africa) Webber (TUL) (Canada) Kaye (SAC) (England) Goldthorp (PIT) (Rwanda) Kwizera (RI) (Honduras) Obregón (BKN)	(United States) Devin Rensing (LVL)	
21	(United States) Bandré (LDN)	(United States) Benalcazar (OC) (United States) Erlandson (LDN) (United States) Ostrem (TBR)	(United States) Rodríguez (SAC) (Spain) Bacharach (RI) (Canada) Kaye (SAC) (El Salvador) Calvillo (ELP)	(United States) Myers (TBR) (Saint Vincent and the Grenadines) Edwards (SAC) (Jamaica) Bennett (COS)	(Germany) Semmle (LEX) (Japan) Yamazaki (DET) (United States) Scearce (PHX) (United States) Ferri (LEX) (United States) Maldonado (SAN) (Guatemala) Rubín (ELP) (Egypt) Aboukoura (LDN)	(Republic of Ireland) Alan McCann (COS)	
22	(Czech Republic) Koleilat (BHM)	(Republic of Ireland) Desmond (SAC) (United States) Tubbs (OC) (United States) Viera (PIT)	(Argentina) Parano (SAN) (United States) Rodríguez (SAC) (Republic of Ireland) Molloy (LEX) (Jamaica) Foster (CHS)	(United States) Cicerone (TBR) (United States) Wolff (SAC) (Iceland) Úlfarsson (LDN)	(United States) Rando (OC) (Argentina) Cuello (SAN) (Canada) Antonoglou (LVL) (United States) Lletget (MB) (South Africa) Webber (TUL) (United States) Myers (TBR) (Spain) Berry (CHS)	(England) Danny Stone (OC)	
23	(United States) Zamudio (CHS)	(Cuba) Nodarse (RI) (United States) Akpunonu (CHS) (Jamaica) Scarlett (HFD)	(France) Noël (NMU) (Mexico) Hernandez (SAN) (South Africa) Webber (TUL) (United States) Jabang (NMU)	(United States) Lletget (MB) (United States) Myers (TBR) (United States) Mendez (ELP)	(United States) Lanphier (LVL) (Mexico) Ortiz (ELP) (United States) Ofeimu (LVL) (United States) Ferri (LEX) (United States) Pinzón (LVL) (United States) Williams (RI) (Guatemala) Rubín (ELP)	(United States) Junior Gonzalez (ELP)	
24	(United States) Lanphier (LVL)	(United States) Antley (TBR) (United States) Timmer (SAC) (United States) Sessock (LVL)	(France) Huerman (LOU) (United States) Creek (COS) (Republic of Ireland) Coffey (HFD) (France) Valot (OAK)	(United States) Perez (COS) (United States) Serrano (LOU) (United States) Mendez (ELP)	(Mexico) Delgado (MB) (United States) Souza (PIT) (Burundi) Niyongabire (LDN) (United States) Wälti (PGH) (Liberia) Farkarlun (ELP) (United States) Amann (PIT) (El Salvador) Moreno (ELP)	(United States) Junior Gonzalez (ELP)	
25	(United States) Shakes (NMU)	(Burundi) Niyongabire (LDN) (Spain) García (OAK) (Haiti) Pierre (TUL)	(Scotland) Blake (IND) (Republic of Ireland) Molloy (LEX) (Spain) Bacharach (RI) (South Africa) Webber (TUL)	(Guatemala) Ordóñez (TUL) (France) Sacko (PHX) (United States) Epps (LEX)	(United States) Dick (IND) (Japan) Yamazaki (DET) (United States) Mikoy (PIT) (United States) Quinn (IND) (Finland) Jääskeläinen (JAX) (Japan) Tsukada (RI) (Senegal) Diouf (DET)	(Scotland) Sean McAuley (IND)	
26	(United States) Jacomen (TUL)	(United States) Smith (CHS) (Dominican Republic) Dollenmayer (ELP) (Cuba) Diz Pe (HFD)	(United States) Anderson (HFD) (United States) Mangione (BKN) (Panama) Torres (ELP) (Republic of Ireland) Coffey (HFD)	(Guatemala) Rubín (ELP) (Spain) Berry (CHS) (Jamaica) Foster (CHS)	(United States) McIntosh (OAK) (England) Messer (CHS) (Jamaica) Scarlett (HFD) (Guyana) Glasgow (MB) (France) Valot (OAK) (United States) Olney Jr. (BKN) (Jamaica) Williams (BHM)	(United States) Ben Pirmann (CHS)	
27	(Brazil) Carvalho (HFD)	(United States) Anderson (HFD) (United States) Knutson (MIA) (United States) Totsch (LOU)	(United States) Me. Rodriguez (SAC) (Brazil) Mota (JAX) (Jamaica) Vassell (BHM) (Argentina) Ma. Rodríguez (DET)	(Colombia) Rocha (MIA) (Jamaica) Bennett (COS) (United States) Davis III (LDN)	(United States) Jacomen (TUL) (United States) Keller (NMU) (Senegal) Mar Boye (PHX) (United States) Creek (COS) (Brazil) da Costa (MIA) (United States) Epps (LEX) (United States) Bassett (PIT)	(Scotland) Liam Fox (JAX)	
28	(Curaçao) Room (MIA)	(Rwanda) Kwizera (RI) (United States) Zengue (LEX) (England) Gurr (SAC)	(United States) Ferri (LEX) (England) Blake (IND) (Italy) Probo (LVL) (Sierra Leone) Daroma (COS)	(Democratic Republic of the Congo) Ngalina (HFD) (Spain) Berry (CHS) (United States) Goodrum (LEX)	(Cameroon) Siaha (HFD) (United States) Maples (COS) (United States) Sessock (LVL) (United States) Davila (LOU) (United States) Kelly (CHS) (United States) Epps (LEX) (Uganda) Anaku (HFD)	(United States) Brendan Burke (HFD)	
29	(United States) McIntosh (OAK)	(Japan) Yamazaki (DET) (United States) Eisner (TUL) (United States) Ostrem (TBR)	(England) Blake (IND) (Brazil) Firmino (LEX) (United States) Epps (LEX) (United States) Anderson (HFD)	(United States) Myers (TBR) (United States) Goodrum (LEX) (Guatemala) Rubín (ELP)	(Mexico) Herrera (COS) (Jamaica) Scarlett (HFD) (United States) Ofeimu (LVL) (United States) Ferri (LEX) (Brazil) da Costa (MIA) (Cuba) Rendón (IND) (Scotland) Hurst (NMU)	(Japan) Masaki Hemmi (LEX)	
30	(Jamaica) Waite (TBR)	(Burundi) Niyongabire (LDN) (Mexico) Ortiz (ELP) (Spain) De Vicente (OAK)	(Mexico) Torres (LDN) (United States) Ycaza (CHS (United States) Davila (LOU) (Brazil) da Costa (MIA)	(United States) M. Rodríguez (SAC) (United States) Goodrum (LEX) (United States) Davis III (LDN)	(United States) Zamudio (CHS) (United States) Crognale (SAN) (United States) Akpunonu (CHS) (France) Jacquesson (OAK) (United States) Epps (LEX) (United States) Diarbian (BHM) (England) Tunbridge (MIA)	(Scotland) Neill Collins (SAC)	
31	(United States) Farr (LDN)	(Cuba) Nodarse (RI) (United States) Farnsworth (MB) (Canada) Antonoglou (LVL)	(United States) Ferri (LEX) (United States) M. Rodríguez (SAC) (United States) Hernandez-Foster (DET) (United States) Pinzón (LVL)	(Cuba) Milanés (MIA) (Colombia) Rocha (MIA) (United States) Lletget (MB)	(Canada) Henry (LVL) (England) Rogers (MIA) (Canada) Yao (RI) (Italy) Probo (LVL) (United States) Shapiro-Thompson (RI) (United States) Epps (LEX) (England) Dennis (NMU)	(Argentina) Gastón Maddoni (MIA)	
32	(United States) McIntosh (OAK)	(United States) Mikoy (PGH) (Jamaica) Lambert (LOU) (United States) Maples (COS)	(England) Dennis (NMU) (United States) Ahl (SAC) (United States) Cruz (TBR) (United States) Ruiz (ELP)	(Barbados) Reid-Stephen (NMU) (United States) Davis III (LDN) (France) Sacko (PHX)	(United States) Batrouni (SAN) (Italy) Piras (LDN) (Trinidad and Tobago) Greene (LEX) (United States) Lletget (MB) (United States) Murphy (LDN) (El Salvador) Moreno (ELP) (Scotland) Hurst (NMU)	(Norway) Pa-Modou Kah (PHX)	
33	(Spain) Campuzano (PIT)	(United States) Scardina (RI) (Jamaica) Lambert (LOU) (Senegal) Mar Boye (PHX)	(Brazil) Firmino (LEX) (United States) Pinzon (LVL) (United States) Ferri (LEX) (United States) Prentice (OAK)	(United States) Serrano (LOU) (United States) Donovan (LOU) (France) Sacko (PHX)	(United States) McGuire (JAX) (El Salvador) Blanco (SAN) (Grenada) Paterson (BHM) (United States) Shapiro-Thompson (RI) (France) Jacquesson (OAK) (United States) Olney Jr. (BKN) (United States) Soñora (MIA)	(England) Simon Bird (LOU)	
34	(United States) Zamudio (CHS)	(Uruguay) Tregarthen (BHM) (Republic of Ireland) Desmond (SAC) (United States) Smith (CHS)	(United States) Murphy (LDN) (United States) M. Rodríguez (SAC) (England) Hilton (TBR) (Argentina) Cuello (SAN)	(Honduras) Obregón (BKN) (United States) Amann (PIT) (France) Sacko (PHX)	(United States) Schewe (LOU) (Canada) Mazzaferro (LDN) (United States) Schaefer (TBR) (Republic of Ireland) Molloy (LEX) (United States) Griffin (PIT) (Sierra Leone) Samadia (HFD) (Egypt) Aboukoura (LDN)	(Republic of Ireland) Alan McCann (COS)	
