= 2026 USL Championship playoffs =

Tournament details
- Country: United States
- Dates: October 30 – November 21
- Teams: 16

Final positions
- Champions: Sacramento Republic FC
- Runners-up: Louisville City FC

Tournament statistics
- Matches played: 15
- Goals scored: 41 (2.73 per match)
- All statistics correct as of November 21, 2026.

The 2026 USL Championship playoffs will be the post-season championship of the 2026 USL Championship season. It will be the sixteenth edition of the USL Championship playoffs. The playoffs will begin on the last weekend of October/first weekend of November, concluding with the final that is planned to take place in late November.

The Pittsburgh Riverhounds SC, the 2025 Eastern Conference champions, were the defending title holders, winning against the Western Conference champion FC Tulsa.

Sacramento Republic FC defeated Louisville City FC in the final 4–3 on penalties to win their second title.

== Format ==
The top eight teams in each conference qualified for the playoffs which was in a single-elimination, fixed bracket format. All playoff matches will be streamed live on ESPN+ except the Championship final on CBS. The playoffs are scheduled to begin on the first weekend of November, with the final taking place between the 19th and 22nd.

== Conference standings ==
Eastern Conference

Pos	Team	Pld	Pts
1	Tampa Bay Rowdies (S)	30	61
2	Charleston Battery	30	53
3	Detroit City FC	30	51
4	Louisville City FC	30	47
5	Pittsburgh Riverhounds SC	30	45
6	Hartford Athletic	30	43
7	Rhode Island FC	30	42
8	Miami FC	30	36
9	Indy Eleven	30	34
10	Birmingham Legion FC	30	30
11	Loudoun United FC	30	31
12	Brooklyn FC	30	21
13	Sporting Club Jacksonville	30	14

Updated to match(es) played on October 24, 2026. Source: USL Championship Standings
(S) Players' Shield winner

Western Conference

Pos	Team	Pld	Pts
1	New Mexico United	30	52
2	Sacramento Republic FC (C)	30	51
3	El Paso Locomotive FC	30	50
4	Lexington SC	30	48
5	Colorado Springs Switchbacks FC	30	47
6	San Antonio FC	30	45
7	FC Tulsa	30	43
8	Phoenix Rising FC	30	42
9	Orange County SC	30	39
10	Oakland Roots SC	30	38
11	Las Vegas Lights FC	30	36
12	Monterey Bay FC	30	24

Updated to match(es) played on October 24, 2026. Source: USL Championship Standings
(C) Champions

=== Bracket ===
Conference Quarterfinals; October 30-November 1	Conference Semifinals; November 7
E1	Tampa Bay Rowdies	1 (4)
E8	Miami FC (p)	1 (5)
E4	Louisville City FC	3
E8	Miami FC	2
E4	Louisville City FC (a.e.t.)	1
E5	Pittsburgh Riverhounds SC	0
Eastern Conference
E3	Detroit City FC	1
E6	Hartford Athletic	2
E2	Charleston Battery (p)	3 (5)
E6	Hartford Athletic	3 (4)
E2	Charleston Battery (p)	1 (5)
E7	Rhode Island FC	1 (4)
W1	New Mexico United	2
W8	Phoenix Rising FC	0
W1	New Mexico United	4
W5	Colorado Springs Switchbacks FC	0
W4	Lexington SC	1 (4)
W5	Colorado Springs Switchbacks FC (p)	1 (5)
Western Conference
W3	El Paso Locomotive FC	2
W6	San Antonio FC	1
W2	Sacramento Republic FC	2
W3	El Paso Locomotive FC	1
W2	Sacramento Republic FC	1
W7	FC Tulsa	0

Conference Finals; November 14–15
E2	Charleston Battery	0
E4	Louisville City FC	2
W1	New Mexico United	1
W2	Sacramento Republic FC (a.e.t.)	2

USL Championship Final; November 21
W2	Sacramento Republic FC (p)	1 (4)
E4	Louisville City FC	1 (3)

== Schedule ==
=== Conference Quarterfinals ===
October 30 East	Louisville City FC	1–0 (a.e.t.)	Pittsburgh Riverhounds SC	Louisville, Kentucky
6:30 PM ET	Niang (yellow card) 16'; Lambert (yellow card) 79'; McFadden (yellow card) 89'; Showunmi 105+1'	Report	Goldthorp (yellow card) 90+4'; Kelp (yellow card) 113'	Stadium: Lynn Family Stadium; Attendance: 7,438; Referee: Abdou Ndiaye

October 30 East	Charleston Battery	1–1 (a.e.t.) (5–4 p)	Rhode Island FC	Mount Pleasant, South Carolina
7:00 PM ET	Houssou (yellow card) 45'; Berry (yellow card) 45+1' (goal) 90+5'; Foster (yellow card) 51'; Ycaza (yellow card) 90+8'; Pirmann (yellow card) 95'; Zamudio (yellow card) 109'	Report	Kwizera (yellow card) 12' (goal) 28'; Bacharach (yellow card) 45+3'; Afonso (yellow card) 74'; Shapiro-Thompson (yellow card) 90+3'; Vegas (yellow card) 90'; Nodarse (yellow card) 120'	Stadium: Patriots Point Soccer Complex; Attendance: 3,530; Referee: Matthew Thompson
	Penalties
	Berry (penalty scored); Suber (penalty scored); Ycaza (penalty scored); Smith (penalty missed); Kissiedou (penalty scored); Kelly (penalty scored)		(penalty scored) Kwizera; (penalty scored) Tsukada; (penalty scored) Yao; (penalty missed) Bacharach; (penalty scored) Vegas; (penalty missed) Rodríguez

October 30 East	Tampa Bay Rowdies	1–1 (a.e.t.) (4–5 p)	Miami FC	St. Petersburg, Florida
7:30 PM ET	Myers 44'; Ostrem (yellow card) 54'; Wyke (yellow card) 69'; Dolabella (yellow card) 87'; Dossantos (yellow card) 101'	Report	Romero 34' (yellow card) 81'; Soñora (yellow card) 45+3'; da Costa (yellow card) 45+8'; Tori (yellow card) 88'; Rocha (yellow card) 90+3'; Díaz (yellow card) 95'; Al-Zubaidi (yellow card) 105'; Knutson (yellow card) 120+1'	Stadium: Al Lang Stadium; Attendance: 5,448; Referee: Matthew Corrigan
	Penalties
	Myers (penalty scored); Dolabella (penalty missed); Schneider (penalty scored); Perez (penalty scored); Vivi (penalty scored); Ostrem (penalty missed)		(penalty scored) Knutson; (penalty scored) Tunbridge; (penalty scored) Rogers; (penalty scored) Rocha; (penalty missed) Díaz; (penalty scored) Tori

October 30 East	Detroit City FC	1–2	Hartford Athletic	Hamtramck, Michigan
8:00 PM ET	Hernandez-Foster (red card) 19'; Dichio (yellow card) 25'; Amoo-Mensah 45'	Report	Anaku 33', 75'	Stadium: Keyworth Stadium; Attendance: 7,027; Referee: Elton Garcia

October 30 West	El Paso Locomotive FC	2–1	San Antonio FC	El Paso, Texas
9:00 PM ET	Rubín 14'; Twumasi (yellow card) 20'; Ortiz (yellow card) 34'; Ruiz (yellow card) 45'; Avila (yellow card) 45'; Alfaro 54' (yellow card) 74'; Dollenmayer (yellow card) 88'; Coronado (yellow card) 90+2'	Report	Patiño (yellow card) 30'; Berrón (yellow card) 37'; Crognale (yellow card) 65'; Pacheco 84'; Hernández (yellow card) 90+4'	Stadium: Southwest University Park; Attendance: 4,078; Referee: Jeremy Scheer

November 1 West	Lexington SC	1–1 (a.e.t.) (4–5 p)	Colorado Springs Switchbacks FC	Lexington, Kentucky
2:00 PM ET	Goodrum 12' (pen.); Brown (yellow card) 56'; Greene (yellow card) 92'; Tschantret (yellow card) 96'; Rodrigues (yellow card) 111'	Report	Bennett 78' (pen.); Creek (yellow card) 117'	Stadium: Lexington SC Stadium; Attendance: 4,909; Referee: Brandon Stevis
	Penalties
	Molloy (penalty scored); Rodrigues (penalty scored); Goodrum (penalty scored); Epps (penalty scored); Okello (penalty missed)		(penalty scored) Tejada; (penalty scored) Hanya; (penalty scored) Amoh; (penalty scored) Maples; (penalty scored) Bennett

November 1 West	New Mexico United	2–0	Phoenix Rising FC	Albuquerque, New Mexico
8:32 PM ET	Hurst 7'; LaCava 48' (yellow card) 63'	Report	Studenhofft (yellow card) 10' (yellow-red card) 75'; Moursou (red card) 52'; Kah (yellow card) 52'; Scearce (yellow card) 59'	Stadium: Rio Grande Credit Union Field at Isotopes Park; Attendance: 9,413; Referee: Muhammad Hassan

November 1 West	Sacramento Republic FC	1–0	FC Tulsa	Sacramento, California
9:00 PM ET	Midence (yellow card) 43'; Crisostomo (yellow card) 61'; Kaye (yellow card) 83'; Willey 88'; Edwards (yellow card) 89'	Report	Wilson (yellow card) 45+2'	Stadium: Heart Health Park; Attendance: 10,338; Referee: Ekaterina Koroleva

=== Conference Semifinals ===
November 7 East	Louisville City FC	3–2	Miami FC	Louisville, Kentucky
6:00 PM ET	Donovan 79'; Serrano 90'; Showunmi 90+7'	Report	Rocha 19' (yellow card) 90+8'; Tori 32' (yellow card) 58'; Rogers (yellow card) 61'	Stadium: Lynn Family Stadium; Attendance: 10,148; Referee: Calin Radosav

November 7 East	Charleston Battery	3–3 (a.e.t.) (5–4 p)	Hartford Athletic	Mount Pleasant, South Carolina
6:30 PM ET	Ycaza 79' (pen.); Swan 83'; Pakhomov 90+7' (yellow card) 90+8'; Smith (yellow card) 95'	Report	Ngalina 13'; Coffey 16'; Moreira (yellow card) 20'; Anaku 31'; Siaha (yellow card) 80'; Burke (yellow card) 88'	Stadium: Patriots Point Soccer Complex; Attendance: 5,228; Referee: Brandon Stevis
	Penalties
	Houssou (penalty scored); Berry (penalty scored); Pakhomov (penalty scored); Ycaza (penalty scored); Kelly (penalty scored)		(penalty scored) Presthus; (penalty scored) Scarlett; (penalty scored) Careaga; (penalty scored) Adedokun; (penalty missed) Williams

November 7 West	New Mexico United	4–0	Colorado Springs Switchbacks	Albuquerque, New Mexico
8:30 PM ET	Dennis 2' (yellow card) 49'; Hurst 29', 44'; Quiah 71'; Noël (yellow card) 80'	Report	Echevarria (red card) 90+2'; Masereka (yellow card) 90+4'; Foster (yellow card) 90+4'	Stadium: Rio Grande Credit Union Field at Isotopes Park; Attendance: 8,591; Referee: Joshua Encarnación

November 7 West	Sacramento Republic FC	2–1	El Paso Locomotive FC	Sacramento, California
9:00 PM ET	Jennings 14'; Benítez 57'; Malango (yellow card) 65'; Gurr (yellow card) 66'	Report	Mendez 21'	Stadium: Heart Health Park; Attendance: 11,569; Referee: Elton García

=== Conference Finals ===
November 14 East	Charleston Battery	0–2	Louisville City FC	Mount Pleasant, South Carolina
6:00 PM ET	Kissiedou (yellow card) 85'	Report	Serrano 9'; Perez 68'	Stadium: Patriots Point Soccer Complex; Attendance: 5,422; Referee: Nabil Bensalah

November 16 West	New Mexico United	1–2 (a.e.t.)	Sacramento Republic FC	Albuquerque, New Mexico
6:00 PM MST	Noël 52'; Timmer (yellow card) 62'	Report	Malango 71'; Edwards 102'	Stadium: Rio Grande Credit Union Field at Isotopes Park; Attendance: 12,178; Referee: Brad Jensen

=== USL Championship Final ===
November 21 Final	Sacramento Republic FC	1–1 (a.e.t.) (4–3 p)	Louisville City FC	Sacramento, California
9:00 AM PST	Jennings 14'; M. Rodriguez (yellow card) 98'	Report	Serrano 31'; Babacar Niang (yellow card) 33'	Stadium: Heart Health Park; Attendance: 11,569; Referee: Abdou Ndiaye
	Penalties
	M. Rodriguez (penalty scored); Desmond (penalty missed); Kaye (penalty scored); K. Edwards (penalty scored); Spaulding (penalty scored)		(penalty scored) Totsch; (penalty missed) E. Davila; (penalty scored) Serrano; (penalty missed) Showunmi; (penalty scored) Duncan
