= Big Ten Conference Men's Soccer Player of the Year =

College men's soccer award

Big Ten Conference Men's Soccer Offensive Player of the Year
- Awarded for: the most outstanding attacking male soccer player in the Big Ten Conference
- Country: United States

History
- First award: 1991
- Most recent: Zach Ramsey, Washington

Big Ten Conference Men's Soccer Defensive Player of the Year
- Awarded for: the most outstanding defensive male soccer player in the Big Ten Conference
- Country: United States

History
- First award: 2009
- Most recent: Harrison Bertos, Washington

The Big Ten Conference Men's Soccer Player of the Year is an annual award given to the top performing college soccer player in the Big Ten Conference. In 2009, the award was split into two honors: the offensive and defensive players of the year.

== Key ==
†	Co-Players of the Year
*	Awarded a national Player of the Year award: ISAA Player of the Year (1984–1995); Hermann Trophy (1967–present); Soccer America Player of the Year Award (1984–present); TopDrawerSoccer.com National Player of the Year Award (2011–present)

== Winners ==
=== Player of the Year (1991–2008) ===
Season	Player	School	Position	Reference
1991	Steve Sergi	Penn State	Midfielder	
1992	Nigel Sparks	Penn State	Defender	
1993^{†}	Chris Kelly	Penn State	Forward	
1993^{†}	Brian Maisonneuve	Indiana	Midfielder	
1994	Brian Maisonneuve* (2)	Indiana	Midfielder	
1995	Stuart Reid	Penn State	Forward	
1996	Reid Friedrichs	Michigan State	Goalkeeper	
1997	Lazo Alavanja	Indiana	Midfielder	
1998	Lazo Alavanja (2)	Indiana	Midfielder	
1999	Aleksey Korol*	Indiana	Forward	
2000	Ryan Mack	Indiana	Midfielder	
2001	Pat Noonan	Indiana	Forward	
2002	Pat Noonan (2)	Indiana	Forward	
2003	Knox Cameron	Michigan	Forward	
2004	Justin Cook	Ohio State	Forward	
2005	Brian Plotkin	Indiana	Midfielder	
2006	Josh Tudela	Indiana	Midfielder	
2007	Xavier Balc	Ohio State	Forward	
2008	Doug DeMartin	Michigan State	Forward	

=== Offensive Player of the Year (2009–present) ===
Season	Player	School	Reference
2009	Jason Yeisley	Penn State	
2010	Will Bruin	Indiana	
2011	Chris Hegngi	Ohio State	
2012	Eriq Zavaleta*	Indiana	
2013	Tomislav Zadro	Wisconsin	
2014	Connor Maloney	Penn State	
2015	Jason Wright	Rutgers	
2016	Gordon Wild	Maryland	
2017	Chris Mueller	Wisconsin	
2018	Jack Hallahan	Michigan	
2019	Nebojša Popović	Michigan	
2020	Victor Bezerra	Indiana	
2021	Peter Mangione	Penn State	
2022	MD Myers	Rutgers	
2023	Peter Mangione	Penn State	
2024	Tommy Mihalic	Indiana	
2025	Palmer Ault	Indiana	
2026	Zach Ramsey	Washington	

=== Defensive Player of the Year (2009–present) ===
Season	Player	School	Reference
2009^{†}	Mark Blades	Northwestern	
2009^{†}	Doug Verhoff	Ohio State	
2010	David Tiemstra	Ohio State	
2011	David Tiemstra (2)	Ohio State	
2012	Chris Ritter	Northwestern	
2013	A. J. Cochran	Wisconsin	
2014	Nikko Boxall	Northwestern	
2015	Liam Doyle	Ohio State	
2016	Alex Crognale	Maryland	
2017	Grant Lillard*	Indiana	
2018	Andrew Gutman*	Indiana	
2019	Jack Maher	Indiana	
2020	Jackson Ragen	Michigan	
2021	Daniel Munie	Indiana	
2022	Daniel Munie	Indiana	
2023	Femi Awodesu	Penn State	
2024	William Kulvik	Maryland	
2025	Lasse Kelp	Maryland	
2026	Harrison Bertos	Washington	

=== Midfielder of the Year (2013–present) ===
Season	Player	School	Reference
2013	Tyler Arnone	Michigan	
2014	Jay Chapman	Michigan State	
2015	Tanner Thompson	Indiana	
2016	Tanner Thompson (2)	Indiana	
2017	Eryk Williamson	Maryland	
2018	Giuseppe Barone	Michigan State	
2019	Aaron Molloy	Penn State	
2020	Marc Ybarra	Michigan	
2021	Ben Bender	Maryland	
2022	Laurence Wootton	Ohio State	
2023	Laurence Wootton (2)	Ohio State	
2024	Michael Adedokun*	Ohio State	
2025	Richie Aman	Washington	
2026	Alex Hall	Washington	

=== Goalkeeper of the Year (2013–present) ===
Season	Player	School	Reference
2013	Andrew Wolverton	Penn State	
2014	Tyler Miller	Northwestern	
2015	Chris Froschauer	Ohio State	
2016	Cody Niedermeier	Maryland	
2017	Jimmy Hague	Michigan State	
2018	Trey Muse	Michigan	
2019	Andrew Verdi	Indiana	
2020	Roman Celentano	Indiana	
2021	Roman Celentano (2)	Indiana	
2022	Keagan McLaughlin	Ohio State	
2023	Kris Shakes	Penn State	
2024	Zac Kelly	Michigan State	
2025	Laurin Mack	Maryland	
2026	Michal Mroz	Indiana	
