= Kris Shakes =

American soccer player (born 2001)

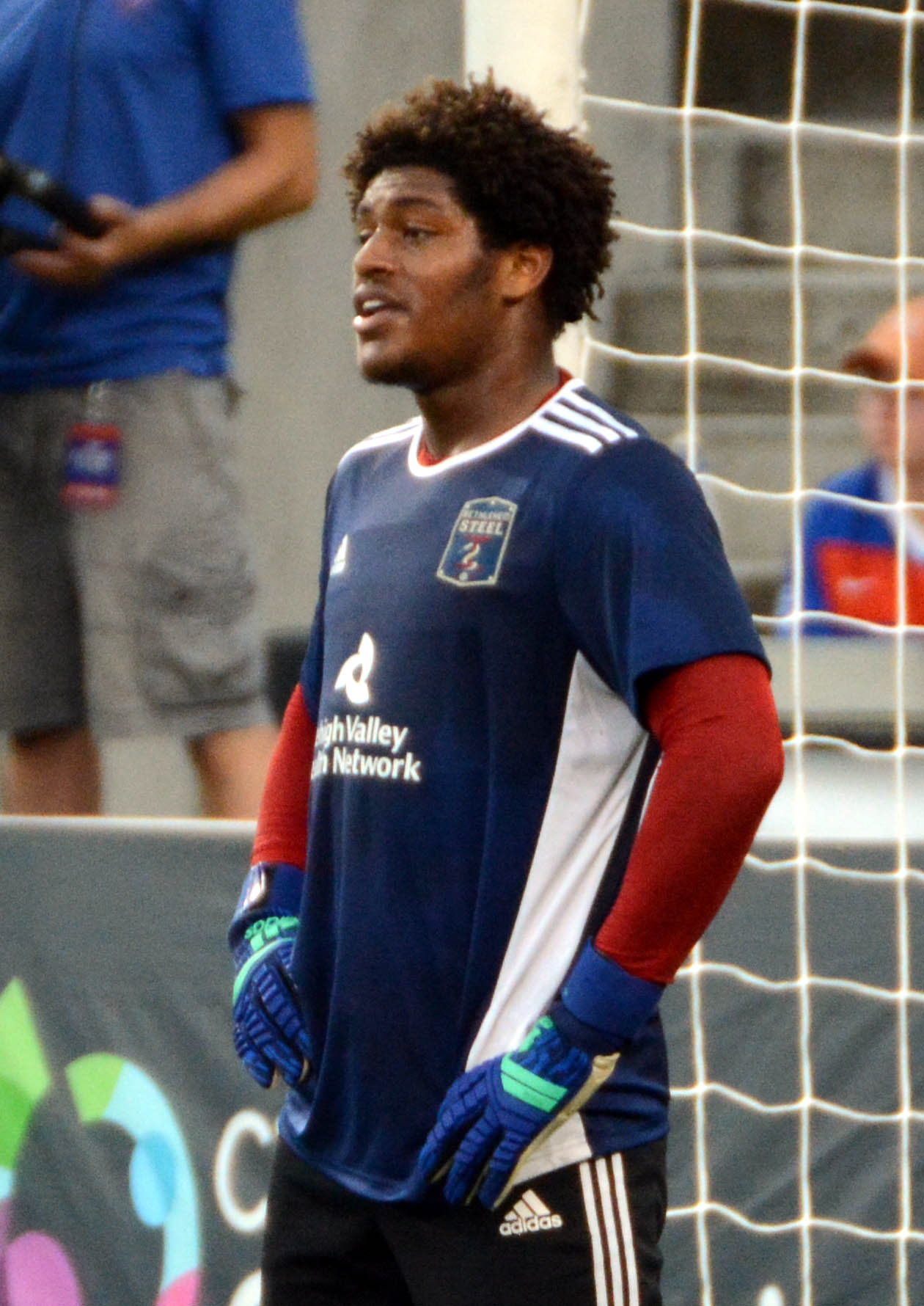
- Shakes training with Bethlehem Steel in 2018

Personal information
- Full name: Kristopher Shakes
- Date of birth: April 27, 2001 (age 25)
- Place of birth: Parkland, Florida, United States
- Height: 5 ft 10 in (1.78 m)
- Position: Goalkeeper

Team information
- Current team: New Mexico United
- Number: 13

Youth career
- 2016: YSC Academy
- 2017–2019: Philadelphia Union Academy

College career
| Years | Team | Apps | (Gls) |
| 2019–2023 | Penn State Nittany Lions | 73 | (0) |

Senior career*
| Years | Team | Apps | (Gls) |
| 2017–2019 | Bethlehem Steel | 0 | (0) |
| 2024– | New Mexico United | 44 | (0) |
- * Club domestic league appearances and goals as of 10:01, 10 November 2026 (UTC)

Kristopher Shakes (born April 27, 2001) is an American soccer player who plays as a goalkeeper for USL Championship club New Mexico United.

== Career ==
=== Youth ===
As part of the Philadelphia Union Academy, Shakes played high school soccer at YSC Academy in Chester, Pennsylvania. He occasionally spent time with the Union's affiliate club Bethlehem Steel across three seasons, but did not make an appearance for the side.

=== College ===
He played collegiality for the Penn State Nittany Lions. As a freshman, he earned Big Ten All-Freshman Team honors in 2019, and as a sophomore, All-Conference Second Team honors in 2020. Shakes was named Big Ten Goalkeeper of the Year following the 2023 season.

=== Professional career ===
Shakes signed his first professional contract with New Mexico United on February 27, 2024, and made his debut on March 23 against the Charleston Battery.

He earned his first USL Championship league win and his first professional clean sheet versus Loudon United on September 22nd, 2024.

Following the 2026 USL Championship season, Shakes was named USL Championship Goalkeeper of the Year earning a place on the USLC All-League First Team. Among Golden Glove-eligible keepers Shakes led the league with a 78.5% save percentage, tallying 117 saves in total, and earning a rating of -10.25 Goals Prevented. His efforts helped lead New Mexico United to a first place finish in the Western Conference regular season.

== Honors ==
Individual

- Big Ten Goalkeeper of the Year: 2023
- USL Championship Goalkeeper of the Year: 2026
- USL Championship All-League First Team: 2026
