= Diego Gómez (Mexican footballer) =

Mexican footballer (born 2003)

Personal information
- Full name: Diego Esaú Gómez Medina
- Date of birth: 10 September 2003 (age 23)
- Place of birth: Pabellón de Arteaga, Aguascalientes, Mexico
- Height: 1.71 m (5 ft 7 in)
- Position: Midfielder

Team information
- Current team: Phoenix Rising
- Number: 8

Youth career
- 2018–2022: Necaxa

Senior career*
| Years | Team | Apps | (Gls) |
| 2021–2025 | Necaxa | 56 | (2) |
| 2026– | Phoenix Rising | 29 | (2) |

International career^{‡}
| 2022 | Mexico U20 | 4 | (0) |
| 2024 | Mexico | 1 | (0) |
- * Club domestic league appearances and goals as of 18:47, 10 November 2026 (UTC) ‡ National team caps and goals as of 31 May 2024

Diego Esaú Gómez Medina (born 10 September 2003) is a Mexican professional footballer who plays as a midfielder for USL Championship club Phoenix Rising.

== International career ==
Gómez makes his senior Mexico debut on 31 May 2024 in a friendly match against Bolivia.

== Career statistics ==
=== Club ===
As of 11 July 2026

| Club | Season | League | | | Cup | | Continental | | Other | | Total | |
| Club | Season | Division | Apps | Goals | Apps | Goals | Apps | Goals | Apps | Goals | Apps | Goals |
|---|---|---|---|---|---|---|---|---|---|---|---|---|
| Necaxa | 2021–22 | Liga MX | 1 | 0 | — | | — | | — | | 1 | 0 |
| Necaxa | 2022–23 | Liga MX | 15 | 0 | — | | — | | — | | 15 | 0 |
| Necaxa | 2023–24 | Liga MX | 24 | 2 | — | | — | | — | | 24 | 2 |
| Necaxa | 2024–25 | Liga MX | 14 | 0 | — | | — | | 3 (Note: Appearances in Leagues Cup) | 0 | 17 | 0 |
| Necaxa | 2025–26 | Liga MX | 2 | 0 | — | | — | | 1 | 0 | 3 | 0 |
| Necaxa | Total | | 56 | 2 | 0 | 0 | 0 | 0 | 4 | 0 | 60 | 2 |
| Phoenix Rising | 2026 | USL Championship | 15 | 2 | 4 | 0 | — | | — | | 19 | 2 |
| Career total | | | 71 | 4 | 4 | 0 | 0 | 0 | 4 | 0 | 79 | 4 |

=== International ===
As of match played 31 May 2024

Appearances and goals by national team and year
| National team | Year | Apps | Goals |
|---|---|---|---|
| Mexico | 2024 | 1 | 0 |
| Total | | 1 | 0 |
