= Colton Swan (soccer) =

American soccer player (born 2007)

Personal information
- Date of birth: May 3, 2007 (age 19)
- Place of birth: Detroit, Michigan, United States
- Height: 6 ft 2 in (1.88 m)
- Positions: Winger; forward

Team information
- Current team: Charleston Battery
- Number: 30

Youth career
- –2023: Michigan Jaguars FC
- 2023–2024: Colorado Rapids

College career
Years	Team	Apps	(Gls)
2025	Indiana Hoosiers	14	(3)

Senior career*
Years	Team	Apps	(Gls)
2024–2025	Colorado Rapids 2	28	(6)
2026	Charleston Battery	24	(9)

International career^{‡}
2025	United States U18	4	(1)
2026–	United States U20	4	(0)
- * Club domestic league appearances and goals as of November 3, 2026 ‡ National team caps and goals as of August 9, 2026

Colton Swan (born May 3, 2007) is an American professional soccer player who plays as a winger or forward for Charleston Battery.

== Early life ==
Swan was born on May 3, 2007, in the United States and is a native of Detroit, United States.

The son of Sandra and Alan, he has a brother. Growing up, he played basketball and attended Indiana University Bloomington in United States.

== Club career ==
As a youth player, Swan joined the youth academy of Michigan Jaguars FC. Following his stint there, he joined the youth academy of Colorado Rapids and was promoted to the club's reserve team in 2024, where he made twenty-eight league appearances and scored six goals.

Ahead of the 2026 season, he signed for Charleston Battery. American magazine Sports Illustrated wrote in 2026 that he was a "consistent presence in attack and transition" while playing fo the club.

It was announced in August 2026 that Scottish Premiership club Hibernian would sign Swan in December, following the conclusion of the 2026 USL Championship season.

Swan ended the 2026 USL Championship regular season with nine goals and three assists, becoming the seventh player to record at least nine goals as a teenager in a single season in the Championship. Swan had amassed a team-high 14 goals across all competitions going into the Eastern Conference Final. In the Eastern Conference Semifinals, Swan scored a crucial header in the three-goal comeback against Hartford Athletic, which set a record as the largest comeback in USL Championship Playoffs history. His efforts during the 2026 seasoned earned him the league's Young Player of the Year award.

== International career ==
Swan is a United States youth international and has represented the country internationally at under-18 and under-20 level. Altogether, he made four appearances and scored one goal while playing for the United States men's national under-18 soccer team.

During the summer of 2026, he played for the United States men's national under-20 soccer team at the 2026 CONCACAF U-20 Championship. On July 25, 2026, he debuted for the team during a 3–0 away win over the Haiti national under-20 football team in the competition.

== Style of play ==
Swan plays as a winger or forward. Right-footed, he is known for his strength and aerial presence on headers in front of goal.

== Honors ==
Individual

- USL Championship Younger Player of the Year: 2026
