= Ihsan Sacko =

French footballer (born 1997)

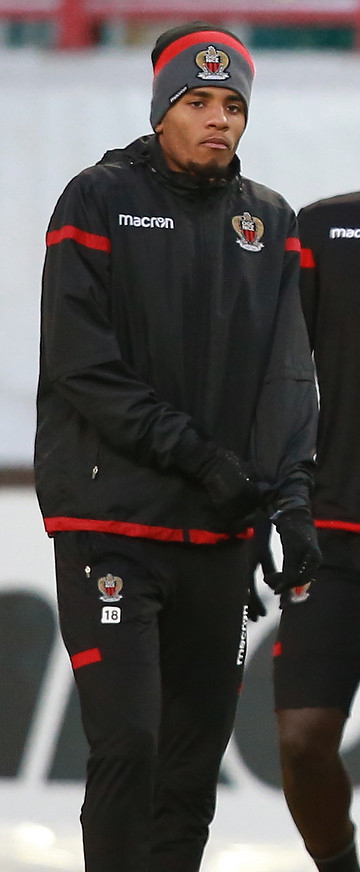

Personal information
- Date of birth: 19 July 1997 (age 29)
- Place of birth: Alfortville, France
- Height: 1.83 m (6 ft 0 in)
- Positions: Forward; winger

Team information
- Current team: Phoenix Rising
- Number: 7

Youth career
- 2012–2015: Valenciennes
- 2015–2016: Strasbourg

Senior career*
Years	Team	Apps	(Gls)
2015–2017	Strasbourg B	16	(2)
2016–2018	Strasbourg	45	(4)
2018–2022	Nice	24	(0)
2018–2022	Nice B	15	(5)
2019–2020	→ Troyes (loan)	15	(3)
2020–2021	→ Cosenza (loan)	18	(0)
2022–2023	Avranches	34	(11)
2023–2024	Thun	39	(7)
2025–	Phoenix Rising	58	(24)
- * Club domestic league appearances and goals as of 18:47, 10 November 2026 (UTC)

Ihsan Sacko (born 19 July 1997) is a French professional footballer who plays as a forward for USL Championship club Phoenix Rising FC.

== Career ==
Sacko is a youth exponent of RC Strasbourg Alsace. He made his first team debut on 8 January 2016 against ASM Belfort replacing Dimitri Liénard after 76 minutes in a 2–0 home win.

On 5 September 2020, he joined Italian club Cosenza on a season-long loan.

On 1 August 2022, Sacko signed a two-year contract with Avranches. On 10 July 2023, he moved to Swiss Challenge League club FC Thun, signing a deal until June 2025 with an option for a further year.

Sacko signed with Phoenix Rising FC on 24 January 2025.

Following the 2026 season, Sacko was named USL Championship Player of the year.

== Personal life ==
Sacko was born in France and is of Malian and Senegalese descent. He has French nationality.

== Honors ==
Individual

- USL Championship Player of the Year: 2026
