= Oliver Semmle =

German footballer (born 1998)

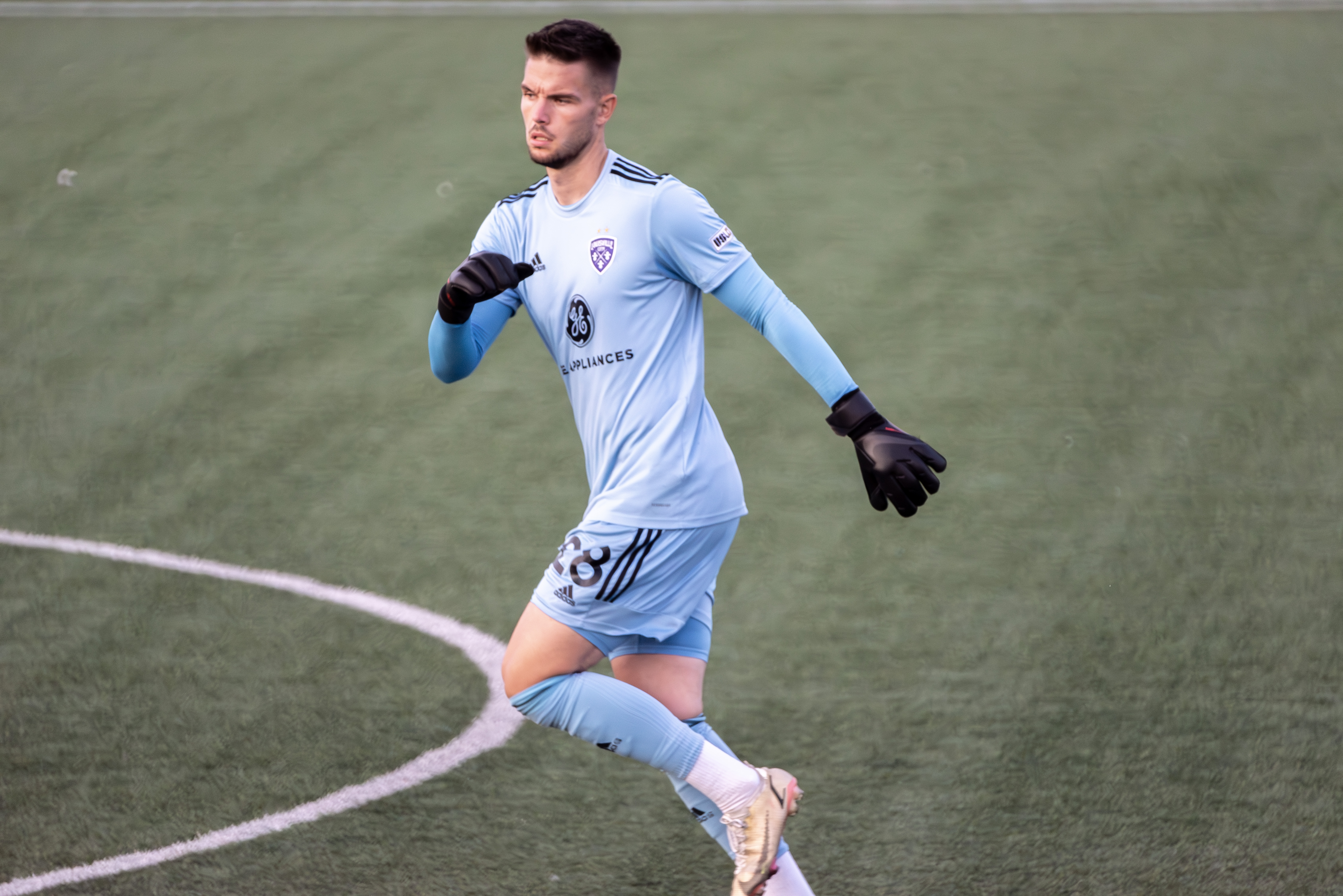
- Semmle warming up prior to the a July, 2023 match

Personal information
- Full name: Oliver Semmle
- Date of birth: 28 March 1998 (age 28)
- Place of birth: Au am Rhein, Germany
- Height: 1.91 m (6 ft 3 in)
- Position: Goalkeeper

Team information
- Current team: Lexington SC
- Number: 17

Youth career
- –2012: FC Rastatt 04
- 2012–2018: Karlsruher SC

College career
Years	Team	Apps	(Gls)
2018	Barton Cougars	7	(0)
2019	Monroe Mustangs	12	(0)
2020–2022	Marshall Thundering Herd	54	(0)

Senior career*
Years	Team	Apps	(Gls)
2016–2018	Karlsruher SC II	24	(0)
2018	Karlsruher SC	0	(0)
2023	Louisville City	31	(0)
2024–2025	Philadelphia Union	17	(0)
2024–2025	Philadelphia Union II	7	(0)
2025	→ North Carolina FC (loan)	11	(0)
2026–	Lexington SC	30	(0)
- * Club domestic league appearances and goals as of 11:26, 9 November 2026 (UTC)

Oliver Semmle (born 28 March 1998) is a German professional footballer who plays as a goalkeeper for the Lexington SC of USL Championship.

== Career ==
=== Youth and college ===
Semmle played as part of the Karlsruher SC academy from 2012, appearing for the club's second team in the Oberliga Baden-Württemberg and making a single senior appearance in the Baden Cup in 2018.

In 2018, Semmle moved to the United States to play college soccer at Barton Community College where he made seven appearances for the Cougars. In 2019, he transferred to Monroe College, making 12 appearances and only conceding two goals during the entire season with the Mustangs, helping lead Monroe to its first ever NJCAA Division I Men's Soccer Championship. Semmle again transferred colleges in 2020, joining Marshall University. In his junior season, Semmle played all but 45-minutes of the Thundering Herd's national title campaign, leading the NCAA with eleven shutouts while holding a 0.380 goals against average. In his three seasons at Marshall, Semmle was named Conference USA Goalkeeper of the Year, the Conference USA Golden Glove Award, First-Team All-Conference USA, 2021 United Soccer Coaches All-Southeast Region Third Team and 2021 Second Team All-Conference USA.

=== Professional ===
On 21 December 2022, Semmle was selected 41st overall in the 2023 MLS SuperDraft by Colorado Rapids. However, he went unsigned by the club.

On 15 February 2023, Semmle signed with USL Championship side Louisville City ahead of their upcoming season. He made his debut for Louisville on 18 March 2023, starting in a 1–0 against Monterey Bay. Semmle tied for the most shutouts (13) in the 2023 season (12 shutouts in regular season and 1 shutout in playoffs).

On 31 January 2024, Semmle was acquired by the Philadelphia Union via a transfer with Louisville City after the Union acquired Semmle's college protection rights from Colorado Rapids.

On 30 December 2025, Semmle was signed by Lexington SC via a free transfer.

== Honours ==
Philadelphia Union

- Supporters' Shield: 2025
