= Blaine Ferri =

American soccer player (born 2000)

Personal information
- Date of birth: September 29, 2000 (age 26)
- Place of birth: Southlake, Texas, United States
- Height: 1.74 m (5 ft 9 in)
- Position: Midfielder

Team information
- Current team: Lexington SC
- Number: 13

Youth career
- –2018: Solar SC
- 2018–2019: Greuther Fürth

Senior career*
Years	Team	Apps	(Gls)
2019–2020	Greuther Fürth II	19	(0)
2020	Fort Lauderdale CF	16	(0)
2021–2022	North Texas SC	38	(1)
2023–2024	FC Tulsa	54	(2)
2025	Foro SC		
2025–	Lexington SC	43	(4)

International career^{‡}
2015	United States U15	4	(0)
2016–2017	United States U17	26	(3)
2018	United States U19	3	(1)
- * Club domestic league appearances and goals as of 11:26, 9 November 2026 (UTC) ‡ National team caps and goals as of October 31, 2021

Blaine Ferri (born September 29, 2000) is an American soccer player who plays as a midfielder for Lexington SC.

== Career ==
=== Fort Lauderdale CF ===
Prior to the 2020 USL League One season, Ferri joined American club Fort Lauderdale CF on a free transfer. He made his league debut for the club on 18 July 2020, playing the entirety of a 2–0 home defeat to the Greenville Triumph.

=== North Texas SC ===
On June 18, 2021, Ferri signed with USL League One side North Texas SC. He debuted for the club the following day, appearing as a 71st-minute substitute during a 0–0 draw with FC Tucson.

=== FC Tulsa ===
On November 29, 2022, Ferri signed with USL Championship side FC Tulsa ahead of their 2023 season. He left Tulsa following their 2024 season.

=== Foro SC ===
Ferri played with United Premier Soccer League club Foro SC during the 2025 spring season, helping the team to a first place finish in the North Texas Conference.

=== Lexington SC ===
On July 31, 2025, Ferri signed a short-term deal with USL Championship side Lexington SC.

== International career ==
Ferri was born in the United States and is of Italian descent through his father. He is a youth international for the United States, having played up to the United States U19s.
