= Pape Mar Boye =

Senegalese footballer (born 2003)

Personal information
- Date of birth: 30 December 2003 (age 22)
- Place of birth: Dakar, Senegal
- Height: 1.94 m (6 ft 4 1/2 in)
- Position: Defender

Team information
- Current team: Phoenix Rising FC
- Number: 4

Youth career
- Galaxy Football Academy

College career
Years	Team	Apps	(Gls)
2023	Clemson Tigers	20	(2)

Senior career*
Years	Team	Apps	(Gls)
2024–	Phoenix Rising	72	(3)

International career
2021	Senegal (beach)	11	(2)
- * Club domestic league appearances and goals as of 18:45, 10 November 2026 (UTC)

Pape Mar Boye (born December 30, 2003) is a Senegalese footballer who plays for USL Championship club Phoenix Rising FC.

== Early life ==
Boye began playing youth soccer in Senegal with Galaxy Football Academy. he moved to the United States for his junior year of high school, where he attended Montverde Academy.

== College career ==
In 2023, Boyé began attending Clemson University, where he played for the men's soccer team. On September 5, 2023, he scored his first collegiate goal in a victory over the Presbyterian Blue Hose. He helped the team win the 2023 NCAA title, being named the Most Outstanding Defensive Player of the tournament, as well as to the All-Tournament team. He was also named to the Atlantic Coast Conference All-Freshman Team and the All-ACC Third Team.

== Club career ==
Following his college career, he declined a Generation Adidas contract with Major League Soccer ahead of the 2024 MLS SuperDraft and instead chose to sign with Phoenix Rising FC of the USL Championship on January 9, 2024. He made his professional debut on March 9, 2024, in a league match against the Birmingham Legion. He scored his first goal on July 19, 2024, in a 2-0 victory over El Paso Locomotive FC.

== International career ==
In 2021, Boye played with the Senegal national beach soccer team at the 2021 FIFA Beach Soccer World Cup.

== Honours ==
Clemson University

- NCAA Division I men's soccer tournament: 2023
