= Lasse Kelp =

German footballer (born 2003)

Personal information
- Full name: Lasse Jonathan Kelp
- Date of birth: 11 February 2003 (age 23)
- Place of birth: Bonn, Germany
- Height: 1.90 m (6 ft 3 in)
- Position: Defender

Team information
- Current team: Pittsburgh Riverhounds
- Number: 4

Youth career
- –2019: 1. FC Köln
- 2019–2020: Hennef 05
- 2020–2022: Fortuna Köln

College career
Years	Team	Apps	(Gls)
2022–2024	UMBC Retrievers	51	(4)
2024–2025	Maryland Terrapins	19	(1)

Senior career*
Years	Team	Apps	(Gls)
2021–2022	Fortuna Köln	0	(0)
2024–2025	Utah United	6	(1)
2026–	Pittsburgh Riverhounds	17	(1)
- * Club domestic league appearances and goals as of November 7, 2026

Lasse Kelp (born 11 February 2003) is a German professional footballer who plays as a defender for USL Championship club Pittsburgh Riverhounds.

== Career ==
=== Youth ===
As a youth, Kelp played for the academy of Bundesliga club 1. FC Köln. In 2019, he moved to FC Hennef 05. The following year, he joined the academy of SC Fortuna Köln. He would go on to compete in the Under 19 Bundesliga with the club.

=== College ===
Beginning in 2022, Kelp moved to the United States to play NCAA college soccer for the Retrievers of the University of Maryland, Baltimore County. Over the next three seasons, he appeared in fifty-one matches, tallying four goals and two assists. During his time with the Retrievers, Kelp won numerous individual honors including being named team captain in 2024. For his senior season, he transferred to the University of Maryland, College Park to play for the Maryland Terrapins. Following his one season with the team, Kelp was named the Big Ten Conference Defensive Player of the Year and a Hermann Trophy finalist as one of the top fifteen college players in the country.

=== Professional ===
Kelp joined Utah United of the USL League Two for the 2024 season, the club's inaugural campaign. He scored the game-winner in a league match again Salt City SC on 31 May. In total, he made six appearances for the club that season, scoring one goal en route to being named to the USL League Two Best XI among individuals playing in the NCAA soccer tournament. Following graduation from the University of Maryland, Kelp was selected by D.C. United with the 85th overall pick in the 2026 MLS SuperDraft in December 2025. However, he was ultimately not signed by the club.

In February 2026, Kelp signed a one-year contract with the reigning USL Championship title holders, the Pittsburgh Riverhounds, with a club option for an additional year. He made his professional debut for the club as a starter on 25 March 2026 in a 2026 U.S. Open Cup Second Round win over Virginia Dream FC. Kelp's debut was delayed to that point as he waited for approval of his P-1 Visa.
