= Joseph Melto Quiah =

Liberian footballer (born 2004)

Personal information
- Date of birth: 29 October 2004 (age 22)
- Place of birth: Montserrado, Liberia
- Height: 5 ft 10 in (1.78 m)
- Position: Striker

Team information
- Current team: New Mexico United
- Number: 31

Youth career
- Izico

College career
Years	Team	Apps	(Gls)
2022–2024	Dayton Flyers	47	(14)

Senior career*
Years	Team	Apps	(Gls)
2018–2020	Paynesville	17	(23)
2020–2022	LISCR	22	(13)
2025	Toronto FC II	2	(0)
2026–	New Mexico United	17	(2)

International career^{‡}
- Liberia U16
- Liberia U17
- Liberia U20
2021	Liberia	1	(0)
- * Club domestic league appearances and goals as of 10:14, 10 November 2026 (UTC) ‡ National team caps and goals as of 30 September 2021

Joseph Melto Quiah (born 29 October 2004) is a Liberian footballer who plays as a forward for USL Championship club New Mexico United.

== Early life ==
Melto Quiah played youth football with Izico.

== College career ==
In 2022, Melto Quiah began attending Dayton University in the United States, where he played for the men's soccer team. He made his debut as a starter in the season opener on 25 August 2022 against the Cal Poly Mustangs. At the end of his first season, he was named to the Atlantic 10 Conference All-Rookie Team. In 2023, he was named to the All-Atlantic 10 Second Team. Ahead of the 2024 season, he was named to the Atlantic 10 All-Preseason Team. At the end of the season, after helping the team win its second consecutive conference title, he was named to the All-Tournament Team, the All-Atlantic 10 First Team, All-Southeast Region First Team, and a Second Team All-American.

== Club career ==
Melto Quiah began his senior career with Paynesville FC of the Liberian Third Division. In October 2020, he signed with LISCR of the Liberian First Division on a three year contract. He scored in a preseason tournament on his club debut in October of that year. He scored his first league goal on 6 December 2020 in a 2–2 draw with Nimba United.

At the 2025 MLS SuperDraft, Melto Quiah was selected in the third round (69th overall) by Toronto FC. In March 2025, he signed a contract with their second team, Toronto FC II, in MLS Next Pro. He made his debut on 12 June 2024, in a substitute appearance against Inter Miami CF II.

On 12 February 2026, Melto Quiah signed a contract with New Mexico United for the 2026 USL Championship season. He scored his first goal for New Mexico United during a 2–0 USL Cup win against El Paso Locomotive on July 11, 2026 then tallied his first USL Championship league goal 4 days later, July 15, in a 4-1 victory versus Lexington SC.

== International career ==
In March 2020, Melto Quiah was part of the Liberia U16 team that competed in a tournament hosted by Tanzania which also included Malawi and Zambia. He also played with the Liberia U17 and Liberia national U20.

In September 2021, Melto Quiah was called up to the Liberia senior team for a friendly against Egypt. He made his senior debut in the match on 30 September 2021 at the age of 16.

== Career statistics ==
=== International ===
As of match played 30 September 2021

Liberia national team
Year	Apps	Goals
2021	1	0
Total	1	0
