= Michael Adedokun =

Nigerian footballer (born 2001)

Personal information
- Date of birth: 27 May 2001 (age 25)
- Place of birth: Eruwa, Nigeria
- Height: 5 ft 8 in (1.73 m)
- Position: Midfielder

Team information
- Current team: Hartford Athletic (on loan from Lexington SC)

College career
Years	Team	Apps	(Gls)
2020–2022	Dayton Flyers	29	(4)
2023–2024	Ohio State Buckeyes	38	(14)

Senior career*
Years	Team	Apps	(Gls)
2021	Dayton Dutch Lions	7	(0)
2022	Fort Wayne FC	9	(3)
2023	Flint City Bucks	11	(3)
2025	CF Montréal	0	(0)
2025	→ Lexington SC (loan)	15	(2)
2025–	Lexington SC	15	(0)
2026–	→ Hartford Athletic (loan)	12	(2)
- * Club domestic league appearances and goals as of November 4, 2026

Michael Adedokun (born 27 May 2001) is a Nigerian professional footballer who plays as a midfielder for USL Championship club Hartford Athletic on loan from Lexington SC.

== Early life ==
Adedokun was born in Eruwa, Nigeria. In 2010, he was noticed by a coach from one of Nigeria's top soccer academies and was invited to join their program.

== College career ==
In 2021, Adedokun began attending the University of Dayton in the United States, where he played for the men's soccer team. He was twice named their Student Athlete of the Week. In 2021, he was named to the Atlantic 10 Conference Commissioner's Honor Roll and in 2022 he was named to the Atlantic 10 Conference All-Tournament Team.

In 2023, he transferred to Ohio State University to play for the men's soccer team. He made his debut on August 24, 2023, against the Cal State Northridge Matadors. He scored his first goal for Ohio State on September 19, 2023, in a victory over the Kentucky Wildcats. At the end of the season, he was selected to the All-Big Ten Second Team. In October 2024, he earned Big Ten Conference Offensive Player of the Week. At the end of the 2024 season, he was named the Big Ten Midfielder of the Year and named to the All-Big Ten First Team, All-North Region First Team, and a First Team All-American. He also won the MAC Hermann Trophy as the top college player in 2024.

== Club career ==
In 2021, Adedokun played with the Dayton Dutch Lions in USL League Two. In 2022, Adedokun played with Fort Wayne FC in USL League Two. In 2023, he played for the Flint City Bucks.

At the 2025 MLS SuperDraft, Adedokun was selected in the first round (13th overall) by CF Montréal. In January 2025, he signed a one-year contract with the club with options for 2026 through 2028. In March 2025, he was loaned to Lexington SC in the USL Championship. On 22 August 2025, Lexington made the deal permanent and he joined the club on a free transfer.

== Career statistics ==
As of July 30, 2023

Club	Season	League			Playoffs		National Cup		Other		Total	
Club	Season	Division	Apps	Goals	Apps	Goals	Apps	Goals	Apps	Goals	Apps	Goals
Dayton Dutch Lions	2021	USL League Two	7	0	—		—		—		7	0
Fort Wayne FC	2022	USL League Two	9	3	—		—		—		9	3
Flint City Bucks	2023	USL League Two	11	3	4	1	—		—		15	4
Career total			27	6	4	1	0	0	0	0	31	7
