= Gunnar Studenhofft =

Caymanian footballer (born 2002)

Personal information
- Date of birth: 5 April 2002 (age 24)
- Place of birth: Cayman Islands
- Height: 1.90 m (6 ft 3 in)
- Position: Forward

Team information
- Current team: Phoenix Rising
- Number: 11

Youth career
- 2014–2015: Elite
- 2015–2018: Academy
- 2018–2021: Florida Rush
- 2021: Orlando City

College career
Years	Team	Apps	(Gls)
2021–2022	Eastern Florida Titans	5	(2)
2022–2023	Manhattan Jaspers	33	(12)
2024	South Florida Bulls	9	(4)

Senior career*
Years	Team	Apps	(Gls)
2022	Cedar Stars Rush	10	(6)
2023	Manhattan SC	7	(4)
2024	Nona FC	3	(4)
2025–2026	Huntsville City	22	(5)
2026–	Phoenix Rising	27	(6)

International career^{‡}
2021–	Cayman Islands	8	(4)
- * Club domestic league appearances and goals as of 18:48, 10 November 2026 (UTC) ‡ National team caps and goals as of 14:13, 17 November 2025 (UTC)

Gunnar Studenhofft (born 5 April 2002) is a Caymanian footballer who currently plays for Phoenix Rising FC and the Cayman Islands national team.

== Youth career ==
Studenhofft began playing football at age 3. For the 2014–15 season he was the top scorer for the islands' U13 Gold League with Elite SC.

In 2016 Studenhofft was part of the Academy SC squad that competed in the Cayman Airways Invitational U14 tournament. Other notable teams competing in the tournament were the academies of Seattle Sounders FC from the US, Gillingham FC and Tottenham Hotspur from the UK and Cavalier F.C. and Harbour View FC from Jamaica. He went on to be the team's top scorer in the tournament with three goals, including his team's only tally in a 1–5 defeat to Harbour View FC. Because of his performance in the tournament he was invited to spend time in England with the under-14 team of Manchester City of the English Premier League.

The following year he helped Academy SC advance to the final of the under-17 FA Cup with two goals against Cayman Athletic SC in the semi-final. Also in 2017 Studenhofft helped his school team, Grace Academy, win its division final and secure the championship. He was then named MVP of the division. Shortly thereafter he was named Player of the Week for the CIFA Boys’ Under-15 League after scoring four goals in a match for Cayman Athletic SC.

In 2018 he moved to central Florida to study and play football at Windermere Preparatory School. At that time he also played for the local Rush Soccer Academy. For the 2019/2020 season, Studenhofft scored a hattrick against All Saints' Academy in the final of the Sunshine State Athletic Conference to help win the school's first-ever title. That season he scored over thirty goals for the team.

== College career ==
For the 2021 season, Studenhofft began playing college soccer in the United States for the Titans of Eastern Florida State College. During his first season with the club he scored two goals in five matches. Following the season he was named to the NJCAA Region 8 All-Region team.

== Club career ==
In 2021 Studenhofft joined the academy of Orlando City SC of Major League Soccer. He made two appearances for the club in MLS Next, scoring against Florida Rush SC. For the 2022 season, Studenhofft joined newly-formed Cedar Stars FC of the United Premier Soccer League. With six goals, he was the club's top scorer en route to qualifying for the playoff rounds.

He joined Manhattan SC of the USL League Two for the 2023 season. Following the season, Studenhofft was drafted 65th overall in the 2024 MLS SuperDraft by the Colorado Rapids. In the process, he became the first-ever Caymanian player selected in an MLS SuperDraft.

In March 2025, Studenhofft signed for Huntsville City FC of MLS Next Pro for the 2025 season. Later that month, it was announced that the Major League Soccer rights to Studenhoff had been acquired from the Colorado Rapids by Nashville SC.

In January 2026, it was announced that Studenhofft had signed a multi-year contract with Phoenix Rising FC in the USL Championship.

== International career ==
Studenhofft represented the Cayman Islands at the 2017 CONCACAF Boys' Under-15 Championship in Bradenton, Florida. The team won its first two matches, against Aruba and Bonaire. In the first match, Studenhofft scored two of his team's three goals. Following a 4–0 victory over Saint Martin, the Cayman Islands finished first in Group G and advanced to the knockout rounds. Studenhofft scored his team's fourth goal in the match. The Cayman Islands ultimately finished the tournament undefeated, ending with a 2–0 victory over Antigua and Barbuda. Studenhofft assisted on his team's second goal of the match.

In 2019 Studenhofft was named to the Cayman squad that competed in 2019 CONCACAF U-17 Championship qualifying. The team opened its campaign with a 2–0 victory over Grenada and a 3–0 victory over the United States Virgin Islands but were eliminated in the final match of the Group Stage by eventual group winners Nicaragua. The following year he was part of the under-20 squad that competed in 2020 CONCACAF U-20 Championship qualifying.

Studenhofft made his senior international debut on 24 March 2021 in a 2022 FIFA World Cup qualification match against Suriname. In March 2024, he was part of the squad that participated in a training camp in Turkey which included friendlies against FC Turan, a professional club from Kazakhstan, and Moldova. The forward scored in the opening 1–5 defeat to FC Turan, the Cayman Islands’ only goal over the two matches.

== Career statistics ==
=== International career statistics ===
As of match played 15 November 2025.

National team	Year	Apps	Goals
Cayman Islands	2021	1	0
Cayman Islands	2022	0	0
Cayman Islands	2023	2	2
Cayman Islands	2024	3	0
Cayman Islands	2025	2	2
Total		8	4

=== International goals ===
Scores and results list the Cayman Islands's goal tally first.

No.	Date	Venue	Opponent	Score	Result	Competition
1.	26 March 2023	Juan Ramón Loubriel Stadium, Bayamón, Puerto Rico	Puerto Rico	1–3	1–5	2022–23 CONCACAF Nations League C
2.	20 November 2023	Trinidad Stadium, Oranjestad, Aruba	Aruba	1–2	1–5	2023–24 CONCACAF Nations League C
3.	15 November 2025	Truman Bodden Sports Complex, George Town, Cayman Islands	Anguilla	1–0	4–0	2025–26 CONCACAF Series
4.	15 November 2025	Truman Bodden Sports Complex, George Town, Cayman Islands	Anguilla	3–0	4–0	2025–26 CONCACAF Series
Last updated 17 November 2025
