= 2026 Colorado Springs Switchbacks FC season =

Colorado Springs Switchbacks FC
2026 season
- President: Martin Ragain
- Head coach: Alan McCann
- Stadium: Weidner Field
- USL Championship: Western Conference: 5th
- 2026 U.S. Open Cup: Round of 16
- 2026 USL Cup: Semi-finals
Home colors	Away colors

The 2026 Colorado Springs Switchbacks FC season is the club's twelfth season of existence, and their twelfth season in the Western Conference of the USL Championship, the second tier of the American soccer league system.

Over the offseason, the club underwent a coaching change. Just days after being eliminated in the 2025 USL Championship playoffs by eventual Western Conference Champions FC Tulsa, head coach James Chambers was fired, one year after helping bring the club their first title in the 2024 USL Championship playoffs. He was replaced by assistant coach Alan McCann, who previously had won back-to-back coach of the year honors in 2018 and 2019 as the head coach of Reading United, the USL League Two affiliate of the Philadelphia Union.

== Players ==
As of April 30, 2026

Note: Flags indicate national team as defined under FIFA eligibility rules; some limited exceptions apply. Players may hold more than one non-FIFA nationality.

No.	Pos.	Nation	Player
1	GK	MEX	Christian Herrera
5	DF	USA	Matt Mahoney
6	MF	USA	Sam Williams (on loan from Chicago Fire)
7	FW	NOR	Jonas Fjeldberg
8	MF	SLE	Frank Daroma
9	FW	NIR	Kyle Vassell
10	FW	USA	Adrien Perez
11	FW	CAN	Levonte Johnson
12	DF	USA	Isaiah Foster
13	MF	PUR	Stevie Echevarria
14	DF	HAI	Duke Lacroix
15	MF	USA	Teddy Blessis
17	FW	UGA	Sadam Masereka
18	MF	USA	Aidan Rocha

No.	Pos.	Nation	Player
20	MF	JPN	Yosuke Hanya
21	MF	JAM	Tyreek Magee
22	GK	USA	Colin Shutler
23	DF	HAI	Garven Metusala
24	DF	USA	Talen Maples
27	FW	PAN	Juan Tejada
37	DF	USA	Brennan Creek
43	GK	USA	Leo Styduhar
51	MF	USA	Dane Valenti
80	MF	JAM	Speedy Williams
90	FW	JAM	Khori Bennett
97	DF	MTQ	Patrick Burner

1. USL Academy Contract

== Competitions ==
=== USL Championship ===
==== Standings ====
Pos	Team	Pld	W	L	T	GF	GA	GD	Pts	Qualification
3	El Paso Locomotive FC	30	15	10	5	48	38	+10	50	Playoffs
4	Lexington SC	30	14	10	6	57	39	+18	48	Playoffs
5	Colorado Springs Switchbacks FC	30	13	9	8	44	38	+6	47	Playoffs
6	San Antonio FC	30	11	7	12	32	30	+2	45	Playoffs
7	FC Tulsa	30	11	9	10	34	31	+3	43	Playoffs

Updated to match(es) played on October 24, 2026. Source: USL Championship Standings
Rules for classification: 1) total wins against conference opponents; 2) goal differential against conference opponents; 3) goals scored against conference opponents; 4) head-to-head points against conference opponents; 5) points per game against conference opponents; 6) points per game against non-conference opponents; 7) fewest disciplinary points; 8) coin toss or drawing of lots

==== Match results ====
On December 16, 2025, the USL Championship released the schedule for all 25 teams for both the regular season and the USL Cup.

All times are in Mountain Time.

===== March =====
March 7 1	El Paso Locomotive FC	2–2	Colorado Springs Switchbacks FC	El Paso, Texas
7:00 PM	Rubin 21', 50'	Report	Bennett 5'; Foster 67'	Stadium: Southwest University Park; Attendance: 6,079; Referee: Muhammad Hassan

March 14 2	Colorado Springs Switchbacks FC	3–2	Las Vegas Lights FC	Colorado Springs, Colorado
4:00 PM	Johnson 60'; Fjellberg 70'; Ofeimu 85' (o.g.)	Report	Okyere 75', 79'	Stadium: Weidner Field; Attendance: 6,039; Referee: Elton García

March 21 3	Orange County SC	1–0	Colorado Springs Switchbacks FC	Irvine, California
8:00 PM	Espy 88'	Report		Stadium: Championship Soccer Stadium; Attendance: 3,510; Referee: Brandon Stevis

March 28 4	New Mexico United	3–2	Colorado Springs Switchbacks FC	Albuquerque, New Mexico
1:00 PM	Harris 64'; Noël 75'; Jabang 90+6'	Report	Bennett 57' (pen.), 90+4' (pen.)	Stadium: Isotopes Park; Attendance: 9,491; Referee: Cristian Campo Hernández

===== April =====
April 4 5	Colorado Springs Switchbacks FC	1–1	Lexington SC	Colorado Springs, Colorado
3:00 PM	Bennett 79' (pen.)	Report	Zengue 11'	Stadium: Weidner Field; Attendance: 5,063; Referee: Rodrigo Albuquerque

April 18 6	Colorado Springs Switchbacks FC	4–1	Monterey Bay FC	Colorado Springs, Colorado
3:00 PM	Perez 18'; Bennett 45+1', 73' (pen.); Tejada 70'	Report	Gindiri 57'	Stadium: Weidner Field; Attendance: 4,860; Referee: Robert Vincze

===== May =====
May 2 7	San Antonio FC	3–4	Colorado Springs Switchbacks FC	San Antonio, Texas
6:30 PM	Hernandez 34', 83'; Crognale 90+7'	Report	Hanya 25'; Masereka 46'; Calov 90+3' (o.g.) Teddy Blessis 90+10'	Stadium: Toyota Field; Attendance: 5,570; Referee: Muhammad Hassan

May 8 8	Colorado Springs Switchbacks FC	2–2	Orange County SC	Colorado Springs, Colorado
7:00 PM	Bennett 45+6' (pen.); Magee 90+6'	Report	Hegardt 22'; Sylla 65'	Stadium: Weidner Field; Attendance: 6,883; Referee: Atahan Yaya

May 23 9	Las Vegas Lights FC	2–1	Colorado Springs Switchbacks FC	Las Vegas, Nevada
8:30 PM	Pope 45+2'; Rodriguez 59'	Report	Teddy Blessis 71'	Stadium: Cashman Field; Attendance: 3,253; Referee: Kalilou Jarju

May 30 10	Oakland Roots SC	0–1	Colorado Springs Switchbacks FC	Oakland, California
7:00 PM		Report	Edwards 5' (o.g.)	Stadium: Oakland Coliseum; Attendance: 4,247; Referee: Elton García

===== June =====
June 13 11	Colorado Springs Switchbacks FC	0–1	Sacramento Republic FC	Colorado Springs, Colorado
7:00 PM		Report	Gurr 66'	Stadium: Weidner Field; Attendance: 6,724; Referee: Gerald Flores

June 20 12	FC Tulsa	1–2	Colorado Springs Switchbacks FC	Tulsa, Oklahoma
6:30 PM	Cabral 45+1'	Report	Tejada 55'; Fjeldberg 60'	Stadium: ONEOK Field

June 24 13	Colorado Springs Switchbacks FC	1–2	San Antonio FC	Colorado Springs, Colorado
7:00 PM	Bennett 15'	Report	Erofeev 29'; Crognale 70'	Stadium: Weidner Field; Attendance: 5,199; Referee: Calin Radosav

===== July =====
July 4 14	Colorado Springs Switchbacks FC	3–1	Phoenix Rising FC	Colorado Springs, Colorado
7:00 PM	Perez 34', 79'; Metusala 48'	Report	Studenthofft 4'	Stadium: Weidner Field; Attendance: 7,024; Referee: Nabil Bensalah

July 22 15	Colorado Springs Switchbacks FC	2–0	Miami FC	Colorado Springs, Colorado
7:00 PM	Bennett 79', 90'	Report		Stadium: Weidner Field; Attendance: 5,783; Referee: Trevor Wiseman

July 25 16	Colorado Springs Switchbacks FC	3–1	Charleston Battery	Colorado Springs, Colorado
7:00 PM	Perez 56'; Teddy Blessis 63', 84'	Report	Cabrera 81'	Stadium: Weidner Field; Attendance: 6,437; Referee: Muhammad Kaleia

===== August =====
August 1 17	New Mexico United	1–0	Colorado Springs Switchbacks FC	Albuquerque, New Mexico
7:30 PM	Howell 51'	Report		Stadium: Isotopes Park; Attendance: 10,264; Referee: Edson Carvajal

August 8 18	Rhode Island FC	2–1	Colorado Springs Switchbacks FC	Pawtucket, Rhode Island
5:30 PM	Tsukada 69'; J. Williams 90+2'	Report	Teddy Blessis 71'	Stadium: Centreville Bank Stadium; Attendance: 9,502; Referee: Matthew Corrigan

August 15 19	Colorado Springs Switchbacks FC	3–2	Birmingham Legion FC	Colorado Springs, Colorado
7:00 PM	Metusala 12', (yellow card) 66' (yellow-red card) 90+11'; Teddy Blessis 34', 78'	Report	Brown 24', (red card) 49'; Ngoma 86'	Stadium: Weidner Field; Attendance: 6,860; Referee: John Matto

August 19 20	Phoenix Rising FC	3–1	Colorado Springs Switchbacks FC	Phoenix, Arizona
8:30 PM	Sacko 35'; Mahoney 72' (o.g.); Studenthofft 90+1'	Report	Perez 45+2'	Stadium: Phoenix Rising Soccer Stadium; Attendance: 3,504; Referee: Matthew Thompson

August 22 21	Colorado Springs Switchbacks FC	0–1	El Paso Locomotive FC	Colorado Springs, Colorado
7:00 PM		Report	De Coteau 85' (o.g.)	Stadium: Weidner Field; Attendance: 7,362; Referee: Igor Bych

August 29 22	Lexington SC	0–1	Colorado Springs Switchbacks FC	Lexington, Kentucky
5:00 PM		Report	Teddy Blessis 74'	Stadium: Lexington SC Stadium; Attendance: 4,816; Referee: Deny Kulasinac

===== September =====
September 4 23	Loudoun United FC	4–5	Colorado Springs Switchbacks FC	Leesburg, Virginia
5:00 PM	Davis 38', 52', 60'; Mahoney 87' (o.g.); Murphy (yellow card) 8' (yellow-red card) 90+5'	Report	Bennett 17', 90+7' (pen.); Fjeldberg 50'; Creek 84'; Amoh 90+1'	Stadium: Segra Field; Attendance: 1,854; Referee: Joshua Encarnación

September 11 24	Colorado Springs Switchbacks FC	2–1	San Antonio FC	Colorado Springs, Colorado
8:00 PM	Fjeldberg 67'; Bennett 70'	Report	Cuello 82'	Stadium: Weidner Field; Attendance: 5,920; Referee: Ekaterina Koroleva

September 19 25	Colorado Springs Switchbacks FC	0–0	New Mexico United	Colorado Springs, Colorado
7:00 PM		Report		Stadium: Weidner Field; Referee: Corbyn May

September 26 26	Detroit City FC	0–0	Colorado Springs Switchbacks FC	Hamtramck, Michigan
5:00 PM		Report		Stadium: Keyworth Stadium; Attendance: 6,258; Referee: Benjamin Meyer

===== October =====
October 3 27	Colorado Springs Switchbacks FC	1–0	Oakland Roots SC	Colorado Springs, Colorado
7:00 PM	Teddy Blessis 41'	Report		Stadium: Weidner Field; Attendance: 6,797

October 10 28	Sacramento Republic FC	1–1	Colorado Springs Switchbacks FC	Sacramento, California
7:00 PM	Edwards 75' (pen.)	Report	Maples 48'	Stadium: Heart Health Park; Attendance: 11,569; Referee: Alyssa Pennington

October 17 29	Monterey Bay FC	0–1	Colorado Springs Switchbacks FC	Seaside, California
8:00 PM		Report	Tejada 28'	Stadium: Cardinale Stadium; Referee: Amin Hadzic

October 24 30	Colorado Springs Switchbacks FC	2–0	FC Tulsa	Colorado Springs, Colorado
7:00 PM	Bennett 31' (pen.); Burner (yellow card) 35' (yellow-red card) 45+6'; Williams 60'	Report		Stadium: Weidner Field; Attendance: 7,425; Referee: Rodrigo Albuquerque

=== USL Championship Playoffs ===
As the fifth seed in the Western Conference, the Switchbacks qualified for the playoffs, scheduled away against Lexington SC. After playing to a draw in regular and extra time with one goal apiece for both sides, the Switchbacks prevailed in penalties in Lexington, moving on to the conference semi-finals against New Mexico United in Albuquerque.

November 1 Quarter-finals	Lexington SC	1–1 (a.e.t.) (4–5 p)	Colorado Springs Switchbacks FC	Lexington, Kentucky
12:00 PM	Goodrum 12' (pen.); Brown (yellow card) 56'; Greene (yellow card) 92'; Tschantret (yellow card) 96'; Rodrigues (yellow card) 111'	Report	Bennett 78' (pen.); Creek (yellow card) 117'	Stadium: Lexington SC Stadium; Attendance: 4,909; Referee: Brandon Stevis
	Penalties
	Molloy (penalty scored); Rodrigues (penalty scored); Goodrum (penalty scored); Epps (penalty scored); Okello (penalty missed)		(penalty scored) Tejada; (penalty scored) Hanya; (penalty scored) Amoh; (penalty scored) Maples; (penalty scored) Bennett

November 7 Semi-finals	New Mexico United	v	Colorado Springs Switchbacks	Albuquerque, New Mexico
8:30 PM ET				Stadium: Rio Grande Credit Union Field at Isotopes Park

=== USL Cup ===
The Switchbacks participated in the third edition of the USL Cup, and the second edition to feature teams from both the USL Championship and League One. Following a flawless run through the group stage that saw only one goal scored on the Switchbacks through four matches, Colorado Springs moved on to the knockout stage, where after a victory away in Spokane against League One club Spokane Velocity in a penalty shootout, they fell away against Hartford Athletic in the semi-finals.

Pos	Lg	Team	Pld	W	PKW	PKL	L	GF	GA	GD	Pts	Qualification
1	USLC	Colorado Springs Switchbacks FC	4	4	0	0	0	10	1	+9	12	Advance to knockout stage
2	USLC	New Mexico United	4	3	0	0	1	8	5	+3	9	
3	USLC	El Paso Locomotive FC	4	2	0	0	2	5	5	0	6	
4	USL1	AV Alta FC	4	2	0	0	2	5	6	−1	6	
5	USLC	Phoenix Rising FC	4	1	0	0	3	3	8	−5	3	

==== Matches ====
April 25	Phoenix Rising FC	0–1	Colorado Springs Switchbacks FC	Phoenix, Arizona
10:00 p.m.		Report	Foster 26'	Stadium: Phoenix Rising Stadium at 38th St/Washington; Attendance: 7,002; Referee: Trevor Wiseman

May 16	Colorado Springs Switchbacks FC	4–0	New Mexico United	Colorado Springs, Colorado
7:00 p.m.	Keller 31' (o.g.); Hanya 34'; Fjeldberg 45'; Rocha 82'	Report		Stadium: Weidner Field; Attendance: 6,311; Referee: Abdou Ndiaye

June 6	Colorado Springs Switchbacks FC	2–1	El Paso Locomotive FC	Colorado Springs, Colorado
7:00 p.m.	Tejada 38'; Fjeldberg 70'	Report	Alfaro 45+2'	Stadium: Weidner Field; Attendance: 6,092; Referee: Joshua Encarnación

July 11	Orange County SC	0–3	Colorado Springs Switchbacks FC	Irvine, California
7:00 PM		Report	Rocha 53'; Masareka 81'; Tejada 90'	Stadium: Championship Soccer Stadium; Attendance: 4,608; Referee: Mark Verso

==== Knockouts ====
August 12 Quarter-finals	Spokane Velocity	1–1 (4–5 p)	Colorado Springs Switchbacks	Spokane, Washington
9:00 p.m.	Gil 14'	Report	Fjeldberg 30'	Stadium: One Spokane Stadium; Attendance: 972; Referee: Brandon Stevis
	Penalties
	Vinyals (penalty scored); Gallardo (penalty scored); Lewis (penalty scored); Brett (penalty scored); Covi (penalty missed)		(penalty scored) Perez; (penalty scored) Tejada; (penalty scored) Maples; (penalty scored) Masereka; (penalty scored) Bennett

September 8 Semi-finals	Hartford Athletic	2–1	Colorado Springs Switchbacks	Hartford, Connecticut
6:00 PM	Coffey 3'; Diz 37'	Report	Fjeldberg 82'	Stadium: Trinity Health Stadium; Attendance: 2,611; Referee: Muhammad Hassan

=== U.S. Open Cup ===
The Colorado Springs Switchbacks, as a member of the second division USL Championship, entered the U.S. Open Cup in the First Round, matched up at home against Sacramento's Azteca FC, a member of the United Premier Soccer League, an amateur club. Following a comfortable victory, the Switchbacks were again scheduled at home, against third-division club Spokane Velocity, who they eventually beat in a penalty kick shootout.

After their tight victory against the Velocity, the Switchbacks were scheduled to play against first-division MLS club Sporting Kansas City, again at home. In a surprising upset, the Switchbacks won comfortably at home against the Sporting KC, allowing no goals in a 3–0 victory. Following their victory against Kansas City, the Switchbacks were matched up away for the first time in the tournament against fellow Colorado-based soccer club Colorado Rapids of the MLS. Despite scoring a 120th-minute equalizer to send the match to a penalty shootout, the Switchbacks ultimately bowed out of the tournament after losing to the Rapids in a penalty shootout.

March 17 Round 1	Colorado Springs Switchbacks (USLC)	3–0	(California) Azteca FC (UPSL)	Colorado Springs, Colorado
8:00 PM ET	Fjellberg 6'; Masereka 82'; Bennett 86'	Report		Stadium: Weidner Field; Attendance: 1,500; Referee: Adam Rice

April 1 Round 2	Colorado Springs Switchbacks (USLC)	1–1 (a.e.t.) (4–2 p)	(Washington (state)) Spokane Velocity (USL1)	Colorado Springs, Colorado
8:00 p.m. ET	Maples 45'	Report	Booth 87'	Stadium: Weidner Field; Attendance: 1,613; Referee: Drew Klemp
	Penalties
	Bennett (penalty scored); Perez (penalty scored); Maples (penalty missed); Hanya (penalty scored); Masereka (penalty scored)		(penalty missed) Peláez; (penalty missed) Fitch; (penalty scored) Hernández; (penalty scored) Lewis

April 14 Round of 32	Colorado Springs Switchbacks (USLC)	3–0	(Missouri) Sporting Kansas City (MLS)	Colorado Springs, Colorado
8:00 p.m. ET	Tejada 11'; Masereka 31'; Bennett 83'	Report		Stadium: Weidner Field; Attendance: 1,902; Referee: Corbyn May

April 29 Round of 16	Colorado Rapids	2–2 (a.e.t.) (5–4 p)	(Colorado) Colorado Springs Switchbacks FC	Commerce City, Colorado
9:00 PM ET	Manyoma 25'; Minoungou 114'	Report	Creek 34'; Bennett 120' (pen.)	Stadium: Dick's Sporting Goods Park
	Penalties
	Navarro (penalty scored); Holding (penalty scored); Herrington (penalty scored); Sealy (penalty scored); Minoungou (penalty missed); Atencio (penalty missed); Rosenberry (penalty scored)		Bennett (penalty scored); Tejada (penalty scored); Williams (penalty missed); Maples (penalty scored); Magee (penalty scored); Burner (penalty missed); Fjellberg (penalty missed)
