= 2022 Colorado Springs Switchbacks FC season =

Colorado Springs Switchbacks FC
2022 season
- President: Martin Ragain
- Head coach: Brendan Burke
- Stadium: Weidner Field
- USL Championship: Western Conference: 3rd
- USL Playoffs: Conference Finals
- U.S. Open Cup: Second Round
Home colors	Away colors

The 2022 Colorado Springs Switchbacks FC season was the club's eighth season of existence, and their eighth season in the Western Conference of the USL Championship, the second tier of the United States soccer league system. Following the conclusion of the season, manager Brendan Burke, who had led the club since the 2021 season, departed the club in January 2023 to assume the role of top assistant with Major League Soccer club Houston Dynamo FC.

== Players ==
As of August 31, 2022

No.	Pos.	Player	Nation
1	GK	USA	Jeff Caldwell
2	MF	USA	Sebastian Anderson (on loan from Colorado Rapids)
3	DF	USA	Bret Halsey (on loan from Real Salt Lake)
4	MF	NED	Yesin van der Pluijm
5	DF	USA	Matt Mahoney
6	MF	USA	Cameron Lindley
7	FW	CAN	Malik Johnson
8	MF	USA	Zach Zandi
11	FW	COD	Michee Ngalina
13	MF	USA	Steven Echevarria
14	MF	SLV	Jairo Henríquez
15	DF	USA	Jimmy Ockford
16	MF	COD	Beverly Makangila
17	MF	USA	Issa Rayyan
18	FW	USA	Duncan Jarvie
20	MF	USA	Ben Mines (on loan from FC Cincinnati)
21	FW	USA	Aaron Wheeler
22	DF	USA	Kyler Tate
23	FW	GHA	Elvis Amoh
27	DF	ENG	Macauley King
30	GK	MEX	Christian Herrera
31	DF	GER	Dennis Erdmann
33	DF	USA	Isaiah Foster
34	DF	USA	Michael Edwards (on loan from Colorado Rapids)
55	DF	TRI	Tristan Hodge
90	FW	GRN	Kharlton Belmar

== Competitions ==
=== USL Championship ===
==== Standings ====
Pos	Team	Pld	W	L	T	GF	GA	GD	Pts	Qualification
1	San Antonio FC (C, X)	34	24	5	5	54	26	+28	77	Qualification for the Conference Semifinals
2	San Diego Loyal SC	34	18	10	6	68	55	+13	60	Playoffs
3	Colorado Springs Switchbacks	34	17	13	4	59	53	+6	55	Playoffs
4	Sacramento Republic	34	15	11	8	48	34	+14	53	Playoffs
5	New Mexico United	34	13	9	12	49	40	+9	51	Playoffs

Source: USL Championship Standings
Rules for classification: 1) head-to-head points; 2) head-to-head goal differential; 3) points-per game within conference; 4) total wins; 5) total goal differential; 6) total goals scored; 7) points earned against top four Conference finishers; 8) disciplinary points; 9) coin toss or drawing of lots
(C) Champions; (X) Regular Season League Champion

==== Match results ====
On January 27, 2022, the Colorado Springs Switchbacks FC released their full schedule for the 2022 season.

All times are in Mountain Standard Time.

===== March =====
March 12 1	Colorado Springs Switchbacks FC	2–1	Orange County SC	Colorado Springs, Colorado
7:00 P.M.	Ngalina 37'; Johnson 51'	Report	Iloski 82'	Stadium: Weidner Field; Attendance: 5,036

March 19 2	Colorado Springs Switchbacks FC	1–0	Monterey Bay FC	Colorado Springs, Colorado
6:00 P.M.	Amoh 40'	Report	Fehr (yellow card) 35' (yellow-red card) 65'	Stadium: Weidner Field; Attendance: 5,292

March 26 3	Birmingham Legion FC	0–2	Colorado Springs Switchbacks FC	Birmingham, Alabama
6:30 P.M.		Report	Ngalina 70'; Mines 89'	Stadium: Protective Stadium; Attendance: 5,122; Referee: Izlen Peksenar

===== April =====
April 2 4	Miami FC	1–2	Colorado Springs Switchbacks FC	Miami, Florida
2:00 P.M.	Parkes 77'	Report	Barry 4'; Ngalina 68'	Stadium: FIU Stadium; Attendance: 1,083; Referee: Elvis Osmanovic

April 9 5	Las Vegas Lights FC	2–3	Colorado Springs Switchbacks FC	Las Vegas, Nevada
1:00 P.M.	Mahoney 43' (o.g.); Jennings 61'	Report	Amoh 22'; Zandi 70'; Lindley 75'	Stadium: Cashman Field; Attendance: 4,922; Referee: Matthew Conger

April 16 6	Colorado Springs Switchbacks FC	1–2	Memphis 901 FC	Colorado Springs, Colorado
7:00 P.M.	Mahoney 90+1'	Report	Molloy 43'; Goodrum 59'	Stadium: Weidner Field; Attendance: 7,334; Referee: Elton García

April 23 7	FC Tulsa	0–2	Colorado Springs Switchbacks FC	Tulsa, Oklahoma
6:30 P.M.		Report	Barry 12'; Foster 39'	Stadium: ONEOK Field; Attendance: 3,222; Referee: Matthew Corrigan

April 30 8	Oakland Roots SC	0–3	Colorado Springs Switchbacks FC	Oakland, California
8:00 P.M.	Zandi 56'; Ngalina 69'; Barry 90+2'	Report		Stadium: Laney College Football Stadium; Attendance: 5,382; Referee: Michael Radchuk

===== May =====
May 5 9	Colorado Springs Switchbacks FC	3–2	Rio Grande Valley FC Toros	Colorado Springs, Colorado
7:00 P.M.	Amoh 43'; Zandi 52'; Malešević 64' (o.g.); Hodge (red card) 81'	Report	Nodarse 76'; Ackwei 79'	Stadium: Weidner Field; Attendance: 7,128; Referee: Malik Badawi

May 21 10	San Antonio FC	PP	Colorado Springs Switchbacks FC	San Antonio, Texas
6:30 PM				Stadium: Toyota Field
Note: Postponed after multiple covered individuals from San Antonio tested positive for COVID-19.

May 28 11	Monterey Bay FC	4–2	Colorado Springs Switchbacks FC	Seaside, California
8:00 P.M.	Roberts 44'; Gleadle 51'; Rebollar 73'; Boone 90+3'	Report	Barry 54'; Amoh 90+7'	Stadium: Cardinale Stadium; Attendance: 3,359; Referee: Corbyn May

===== June =====
June 3 12	Colorado Springs Switchbacks FC	3–0	Las Vegas Lights FC	Colorado Springs, Colorado
7:00 P.M.	Amoh 26'; Ngalina 57'; Mahoney 60'	Report		Stadium: Weidner Field; Attendance: 7,650; Referee: Brad Jensen

June 11 13	LA Galaxy II	1–3	Colorado Springs Switchbacks FC	Carson, California
8:30 P.M.	Cabral 14'	Report	Barry 37'; Amoh 58'; Lindley 67'	Stadium: Dignity Health Sports Park; Referee: Matthew Corrigan

June 18 14	Colorado Springs Switchbacks FC	4–3	Indy Eleven	Colorado Springs, Colorado
7:00 P.M.	Ngalina 17', 69'; Barry 45+1' (pen.); Zandi 66'	Report	Arteaga 28', 90+6'; Aguilera Jr. 63'	Stadium: Weidner Field; Attendance: 8,023; Referee: Elijio Arreguin

June 24 15	Colorado Springs Switchbacks FC	0–1	San Antonio FC	Colorado Springs, Colorado
7:00 PM		Report	Mahoney 48' (o.g.)	Stadium: Weidner Field; Attendance: 6,733; Referee: Matthew Conger

June 28 16	Hartford Athletic	2–0	Colorado Springs Switchbacks FC	Hartford, Connecticut
6:00 P.M.	Martínez 74'; Lewis 79'	Report		Stadium: Trinity Health Stadium; Attendance: 5,241; Referee: John Griggs

===== July =====
July 1 17	Colorado Springs Switchbacks FC	3–0	Sacramento Republic FC	Colorado Springs, Colorado
7:00 P.M.	Amoh 14'; Barry 35', 48'	Report		Stadium: Weidner Field; Attendance: 6,580; Referee: Joshua Encarnación

July 4 18	Colorado Springs Switchbacks FC	2–3	San Diego Loyal SC	Colorado Springs, Colorado
7:00 P.M.	Barry 36', 68' (pen.)	Report	Adams 51'; Moshobane 63'; Stoneman (yellow card) 42' (yellow-red card) 65'; Conway 81'	Stadium: Weidner Field; Attendance: 8,023; Referee: Calin Radosav

July 9 19	El Paso Locomotive FC	1–0	Colorado Springs Switchbacks FC	El Paso, Texas
7:30 P.M.	Gómez 18'; Solignac (yellow card) 75' (yellow-red card) 87'	Report	Mahoney (red card) 76'; Caldwell (yellow card) 77'	Stadium: Southwest University Park; Attendance: 7,009; Referee: Adam Kilpatrick

July 15 20	Colorado Springs Switchbacks FC	4–2	LA Galaxy II	Colorado Springs, Colorado
7:00 P.M.	Ngalina 20'; Barry 27'; Amoh 58', 90+7'	Report	Dunbar 45+3' (pen.); Johnson 90+3'	Stadium: Weidner Field; Attendance: 8,023; Referee: Matthew Thompson

July 18 21	San Diego Loyal SC	3–0	Colorado Springs Switchbacks FC	San Diego, California
8:00 P.M.	Amang 18'; Moshobane 21'; Blake 67'	Report	Echevarria (yellow card) 35' (yellow-red card) 66'; Wheeler (yellow card) 60' (yellow-red card) 83'	Stadium: Torero Stadium; Attendance: 4,299; Referee: Kevin Broadley; Assistant referees: Malik Badawi

July 22 22	Colorado Springs Switchbacks FC	3–3	Charleston Battery	Colorado Springs, Colorado
7:00 P.M.	Amoh 24'; Barry 72'; Henríquez 77' (pen.)	Report	Geobel Pérez Oquendo 5'; Williams 52'; Paterson 90+2'	Stadium: Weidner Field; Attendance: 6,979; Referee: Matthew Corrigan

July 30 23	Phoenix Rising FC	4–0	Colorado Springs Switchbacks FC	Chandler, Arizona
8:30 P.M.	Quinn 19'; Williams 25'; Farrell 49'; Antwi 90+4'	Report		Stadium: Wild Horse Pass Stadium; Referee: Kevin Broadley

===== August =====
August 6 24	Orange County SC	3–3	Colorado Springs Switchbacks FC	Irvine, California
8:00 P.M.	Okoli 45+1' (pen.); McCabe 46'; Partida (yellow card) 54'; Powers 74'; Hoffman (yellow card) 90'	Report	Ngalina 35'; Amoh (yellow card) 73' (goal) 80'; Barry 90+2' (pen.)	Stadium: Championship Soccer Stadium; Attendance: 4,068; Referee: Ricardo Fierro

August 12 25	Colorado Springs Switchbacks FC	4–4	El Paso Locomotive FC	Colorado Springs, Colorado
7:00 P.M.	Barry 4', 6'; Amoh 9'; Wheeler 90+4'	Report	Mares 53', 65'; Solignac 57', 67'	Stadium: Weidner Field; Attendance: 7,445; Referee: Brandon Stevis

August 17 26	Sacramento Republic FC	3–0	Colorado Springs Switchbacks FC	Sacramento, California
9:00 P.M.	Foster 12'; LaGrassa 32'; Keko 45+1'	Report		Stadium: Heart Health Park; Attendance: 8,169; Referee: Luis Guardia

August 20 27	Colorado Springs Switchbacks FC	1–0	Tampa Bay Rowdies	Colorado Springs, Colorado
7:00 P.M.	Henriquez 66'	Report		Stadium: Weidner Field; Attendance: 6,887; Referee: Mark Allatin

August 27 28	Colorado Springs Switchbacks FC	1–0	New Mexico United	Colorado Springs, Colorado
7:00 P.M.	Barry 39'	Report		Stadium: Weidner Field; Attendance: 8,023; Referee: Greg Dopka

===== September =====
September 3 29	Colorado Springs Switchbacks FC	1–0	Phoenix Rising FC	Colorado Springs, Colorado
7:00 P.M.	Henríquez 55'	Report	King (yellow card) 23' (red card) 45+3'	Stadium: Weidner Field; Attendance: Eric Tattersall; Referee: 7,623

September 10 30	Colorado Springs Switchbacks FC	1–2	Detroit City FC	Colorado Springs, Colorado
7:00 P.M.	Wheeler 90+2'	Report	Rodriguez 42'; Wynne 59'	Stadium: Weidner Field; Attendance: 7,587; Referee: Calin Radosav

September 17 31	Rio Grande Valley FC Toros	1–0	Colorado Springs Switchbacks FC	Edinburg, Texas
6:30 P.M.	Fjeldberg 29'	Report		Stadium: H-E-B Park; Attendance: 4,534; Referee: Luis Guardia

September 20 10	San Antonio FC	1–0	Colorado Springs Switchbacks FC	San Antonio, Texas
8:30 P.M.	PC 76'	Report		Stadium: Toyota Field; Attendance: 5,113; Referee: Elvis Osmanovic
Note: Rescheduled match from May 21, 2022.

September 24 32	Colorado Springs Switchbacks FC	1–1	Oakland Roots SC	Colorado Springs, Colorado
7:00 P.M.	Amoh 1', (yellow card) 54' (yellow-red card) 55'	Report	Karlsson 57' (pen.)	Stadium: Weidner Field; Attendance: 8,023; Referee: John Griggs

===== October =====
October 5 33	El Paso Locomotive FC	1–4	Colorado Springs Switchbacks FC	El Paso, Texas
6:00 P.M.	Solignac 27'	Report	Ngalina 22', 59' (pen.), 69'; [Zach Zandi|Zandi]] 54'	Stadium: Southwest University Park; Referee: Gerald Flores

October 15 34	New Mexico United	2–0	Colorado Springs Switchbacks FC	Isotopes Park
7:00 P.M.	Nava 21'; Bruce 44'	Report		Stadium: Albuquerque, New Mexico; Attendance: 14,519; Referee: Natalie Simon

===== Playoffs =====
As the third seed in the Western Conference, the Switchbacks were granted a spot in the 2022 USL Championship playoffs, first matched up at home against Rio Grande Valley FC Toros. Following their victory against the Toros, the Switchbacks were again scheduled at home for the semi-finals, this time matched up against Sacramento Republic FC. After a tight victory following added extra time at home, the Switchbacks headed to San Antonio for their first away match of the playoffs, matched up against San Antonio FC, who they'd eventually fall to.

October 22 West Quarter-Finals	Colorado Springs Switchbacks FC	3–0	Rio Grande Valley FC Toros	Colorado Springs, Colorado
6:30 PM MDT	Amoh (yellow card) 29'; Henríquez 84'; Wheeler 90', 90+4'	Report	Ricketts (yellow card) 23'	Stadium: Weidner Field; Attendance: 7,036; Referee: Mark Allatin

October 29 West Semi-Finals	Colorado Springs Switchbacks FC	2–1 (a.e.t.)	Sacramento Republic FC	Colorado Springs, Colorado
6:00 PM MDT	Ngalina 37', 96'; Wheeler (yellow card) 106'; Caldwell (yellow card) 114'; Anderson (yellow card) 120+2'	Report	Lopez 18'; LaGrassa (yellow card) 39'; Gurr (yellow card) 45+2'; Casey (yellow card) 65'; Martínez (yellow card) 66'; Archimède (yellow card) 120+2'	Stadium: Weidner Field; Attendance: 7,075; Referee: Sergii Demianchuk

November 6 West Finals	San Antonio FC	2–0	Colorado Springs Switchbacks FC	San Antonio, Texas
7:30 PM CST	Maloney 23'; Parano (yellow card) 66'; Adeniran (yellow card) 75'; Patiño (yellow card) 90+2' (goal) 90+11'	Report	Ngalina (yellow card) 10'; Hodge (yellow card) 49'; Henriquez (yellow card) 54'; Wheeler (yellow card) 78'; Herrera (yellow card) 87'; Mahoney (yellow card) 89'	Stadium: Toyota Field; Attendance: 8,245; Referee: Kevin Broadley

=== U.S. Open Cup ===
Following the competition's two year hiatus due to the COVID-19 pandemic, the U.S. Open Cup returned for the first time since 2019. As a member of the USL Championship, the Switchbacks entered the U.S. Open Cup in the Second Round, matched up against third-division USL League One and fellow Coloradan team Northern Colorado Hailstorm FC at home. The match is notable for being the Hailstorm's first competitive match in the club's history, after the club was first announced in July 2021. As the higher-division club, the Switchbacks suffered an upset loss, as despite being up a man for over two thirds of regular time and almost half of added extra time, the Switchbacks lost by one goal to the Hailstorm.

April 6 Second Round	Colorado Springs Switchbacks FC (USLC) (Colorado)	0–1 (a.e.t.)	Northern Colorado Hailstorm FC (USL1)	Colorado Springs, Colorado
7:00 pm MDT	Hodge (yellow card) 90+6' (yellow-red card) 103'	Report	Parra (red card) 27'; Jerry Desdunes 96'	Stadium: Weidner Field; Attendance: 1,099; Referee: Laura Rodriguez
Note: First competitive game and goal for Northern Colorado.
