= 2021 Colorado Springs Switchbacks FC season =

Colorado Springs Switchbacks FC
2021 season
- President: Martin Ragain
- Head coach: Brendan Burke
- Stadium: Weidner Field
- USL Championship: Western Conference: 5th Mountain Division: 3rd
- USL Playoffs: Conference Finals
- U.S. Open Cup: Not held/DNQ
Home colors	Away colors

The 2021 Colorado Springs Switchbacks FC season was the club's seventh season of existence, and their seventh season in the Western Conference of the USL Championship, the second tier of the United States soccer league system.

Over the offseason, the Switchbacks underwent many notable changes over the offseason. After the conclusion of the previous season, previous head coach Alan Koch left his position in mid-November 2020 due to personal reasons. He was replaced by Brendan Burke, who had previously served as an assistant for the Philadelphia Union and most recently severed as the head coach for the Union's reserve team, the Bethlehem Steel FC. Furthermore, the Switchbacks moved stadiums. After six seasons at the original Weidner Field, the club moved to their new $47 million stadium, also called Weidner Field, and located in downtown Colorado Springs. The original stadium was kept by the Switchbacks as a training field, and renamed to Martin 'Ed' Ragain Field.

At the conclusion of this season, the Colorado Rapids, who had been the MLS affiliate of the Switchbacks since 2018, ended a partnership that had lasted for the previous three seasons between the two clubs in December 2021 to form their own reserve club, the Colorado Rapids 2, who would compete in MLS Next Pro.

== Players ==
As of September 21, 2021

No.	Pos.	Player	Nation
1	GK	CAN	Sean Melvin
5	DF	USA	Matt Mahoney
6	MF	USA	Rony Argueta
7	MF	USA	José Francisco Torres
8	MF	USA	Zach Zandi
9	FW	CMR	Thomas Amang
10	FW	GUI	Hadji Barry
12	GK	FRA	Simon Lefebvre (on loan from Louisville City)
13	MF	USA	Steven Echevarria
14	DF	USA	Lamar Batista
15	DF	USA	Jimmy Ockford
16	MF	COD	Beverly Makangila
20	MF	KEN	Philip Mayaka
22	DF	USA	Steve Flores
23	MF	USA	Dillon Serna
27	DF	USA	Sebastian Anderson
28	GK	USA	Abraham Rodriguez
29	FW	USA	Matt Hundley
30	GK	USA	Andrew Pannenberg
31	FW	JAM	Deshane Beckford (on loan from Montego Bay United)
34	DF	USA	Michael Edwards
37	FW	USA	Dantouma Toure
44	DF	USA	Jordan Burt
55	DF	TRI	Tristan Hodge
77	MF	JAM	Andre Lewis

On loan from MLS affiliate Colorado Rapids.
Colorado Rapids academy player.

=== Out on loan ===
No.	Pos.	Player	Nation
11	FW	COD	Michee Ngalina (at Los Angeles FC)

== Competitions and results ==
=== USL Championship ===
==== Standings ====
===== Conference standings =====
Pos	Div	Team	Pld	W	D	L	GF	GA	GD	Pts	Qualification
3	PC	Orange County SC	32	15	7	10	44	37	+7	52	Playoffs
4	MT	San Antonio FC	32	14	10	8	50	38	+12	52	Playoffs
5	MT	Colorado Springs Switchbacks FC	32	13	10	9	60	50	+10	49	Playoffs
6	PC	San Diego Loyal SC	32	14	6	12	51	43	+8	48	Playoffs
7	MT	Rio Grande Valley FC Toros	32	13	8	11	49	42	+7	47	Playoffs

Source: USL Championship
Rules for classification: 1) points; 2) head-to-head points; 3) head-to-head goal differential; 4) total points earned against in-division opponents; 5) total regular season wins against in-division opponents; 6) total goal differential against in-division opponents; 7) total goals scored against in-division opponents; 8) disciplinary points; 9) coin toss or drawing of lots.

==== Mountain Division ====
Pos	Team	Pld	Pts
1	El Paso Locomotive FC	32	64
2	San Antonio FC	32	52
3	Colorado Springs Switchbacks FC	32	50
4	Rio Grande Valley FC Toros	32	47
5	New Mexico United	32	46

Source: USL

==== Match results ====
Due to COVID-19 pandemic precautions, the format of the 2021 USL Championship season was heavily modified. For the 2021 season, each of the two conferences were split into two divisions and played a 32-game schedule.

On January 27, 2022, the Colorado Springs Switchbacks FC released their full schedule for the 2022 season.

All times are in Mountain Standard Time.

===== May =====
May 1 1	San Antonio FC	3–0	Colorado Springs Switchbacks FC	San Antonio, Texas
4:30 P.M.	Patino 16', 27', 87'	Report		Stadium: Toyota Field; Attendance: 3,768

May 14 2	Sporting KC II	0–4	Colorado Springs Switchbacks FC	Kansas City, Kansas
6:00 P.M.	Constant (red card) 39'	Report	Dewing 7'; Barry 29' (pen.), 64'; Ngalina 36' (pen.)	Stadium: Children's Mercy Park

May 21 3	Colorado Springs Switchbacks FC	1–3	New Mexico United	Colorado Springs, Colorado
7:00 P.M.	Barry 1'	Report	Rivas 8'; Tinari (yellow card) 45+1' (yellow-red card) 54'; Moreno 48'; Bruce 90+7'	Stadium: Weidner Field; Attendance: 5,600; Referee: Elijio Arreguin

===== June =====
June 5 4	Colorado Springs Switchbacks FC	1–1	San Antonio FC	Colorado Springs, Colorado
7:00 P.M.	Barry 6'; Edwards (red card) 45+1'	Report	Patiño (yellow card) 34' (yellow-red card) 45+1'; Dhillon 88'	Stadium: Weidner Field; Attendance: 5,531; Referee: Brandon Stevis

June 12 5	El Paso Locomotive FC	1–1	Colorado Springs Switchbacks FC	El Paso, Texas
7:30 P.M.	King 12'	Report	Barry 73' (pen.)	Stadium: Southwest University Park; Attendance: 6,589; Referee: Elijio Arreguin

June 16 6	Colorado Springs Switchbacks FC	4–2	Tacoma Defiance	Colorado Springs, Colorado
7:00 P.M.	Ngalina 32', 89'; Beckford 36'; Barry 80'	Report	M. Vargas 11'; Díaz 85'	Stadium: Weidner Field; Attendance: 5,164; Referee: John Griggs

June 22 7	Austin Bold FC	2–3	Colorado Springs Switchbacks FC	Austin, Texas
: P.M.	Garcia 3'; Okoli 30' (pen.)	Report	Barry 16' (pen.) 56'; Batista (red card) 27'; Toure 90'	Stadium: Bold Stadium; Attendance: 1,248; Referee: Joshua Encarnación

June 25 8	Colorado Springs Switchbacks FC	3–1	New Mexico United	Colorado Springs, Colorado
7:00 P.M.	Beckford 59'; Barry 69', 82'	Report	Suggs 19'	Stadium: Weidner Field; Attendance: 6,481; Referee: Mathew Corrigan

===== July =====
July 1 9	Colorado Springs Switchbacks FC	0–2	Orange County SC	Colorado Springs, Colorado
7:00 P.M.	https://www.espn.com/soccer/match/_/gameId/599311/orange-county-sc-colorado-springs-switchbacks-fc		Markkanen 18'; Calvillo 90'	Stadium: Weidner Field; Attendance: 5,298

July 4 10	Colorado Springs Switchbacks FC	3–1	Real Monarchs SLC	Colorado Springs, Colorado
4:30 P.M.	Beckford 16'; Barry 22'; Edwards 32'	Report	Briggs 28'	Stadium: Weidner Field; Attendance: 8,023

July 9 11	New Mexico United	3–1	Colorado Springs Switchbacks FC	Albuquerque, New Mexico
7:30 P.M.	Rivas 16'; Azira 90+1'; Ilic 90+3'	Report	Barry 33'; Anderson (red card) 53'	Stadium: Isotopes Park; Attendance: 9,728; Referee: Matthew Thompson

July 17 12	Colorado Springs Switchbacks FC	2–3	San Antonio FC	Colorado Springs, Colorado
2:00 P.M.	Barry 14'; Zandi 73'	Report	Nathan 7', 43' (pen.); PC 24' (pen.)	Stadium: Weidner Field; Attendance: 4,875; Referee: Mark Allatin

July 23 13	Colorado Springs Switchbacks FC	1–1	Louisville City FC	Colorado Springs, Colorado
7:00 P.M.	Ngalina 87'	Report	Hoppenot 74'	Stadium: Weidner Field; Attendance: 6,488; Referee: Jeremy Scheer

July 31 14	Loudoun United FC	1–3	Colorado Springs Switchbacks FC	Leesburg, Virginia
6:00 P.M.	Smith 70'	Report	Edwards 63'; Toure 65'; Barry 90+2'	Stadium: Segra Field; Attendance: 905; Referee: Izlen Peksenar

===== August =====
August 4 15	Austin Bold FC	2–1	Colorado Springs Switchbacks FC	Austin, Texas
7:00 P.M.	Torres 12'; Fernandez 81'	Report	Yapi 31'	Stadium: Bold Stadium; Attendance: 547; Referee: Gerald Flores

August 7 16	Colorado Springs Switchbacks FC	4–2	Hartford Athletic	Colorado Springs, Colorado
7:00 P.M.	Barry 19' (pen.); Ngalina 38'; Lewis 51', 63'	Report	McGlynn 24'; Ashitey 58'	Stadium: Weidner Field; Attendance: 6,570; Referee: Malik Badawi

August 10 17	Memphis 901 FC	1–1	Colorado Springs Switchbacks FC	Memphis, Tennessee
6:30 P.M.	Murphy 84' (pen.)	Report	Barry 35' (pen.); Ockford (yellow card) 56' (yellow-red card) 83'	Stadium: AutoZone Park; Attendance: 3,512; Referee: John Matto

August 14 18	Rio Grande Valley FC Toros	2–5	Colorado Springs Switchbacks FC	Edinburg, Texas
4:00 P.M.	Azócar 28'; Sánchez 59'	Report	Amang 57'; Barry 37', 73'; Ngalina 69'; Yapi 89'	Stadium: H-E-B Park; Attendance: 3,018; Referee: Michael Radchuk

August 21 19	Charlotte Independence	3–3	Colorado Springs Switchbacks FC	Charlotte, North Carolina
6:00 P.M.	Marveaux 12'; Palomino 55'; Parra 71'	Report	Barry 18'; Lewis 22'; Ngalina 84'	Stadium: American Legion Memorial Stadium; Attendance: 1,902

August 28 20	Colorado Springs Switchbacks FC	4–1	Austin Bold FC	Colorado Springs, Colorado
7:00 P.M.	Barry 22' (pen.); Hodge 38'; Amang 40'; Ngalina 90+1'	Report	Báez 15'	Stadium: Weidner Field; Attendance: 8,023; Referee: Sergii Demianchuk

===== September =====
September 4 21	New Mexico United	3–2	Colorado Springs Switchbacks FC	Albuquerque, New Mexico
7:30 P.M.	Wehan 3'; Suggs 42'; Sandoval 47' (pen.)		Tetteh 23' (o.g.): Toure 88'; Ngalina (red card) 90+3'	Stadium: Isotopes Park; Attendance: 7,077; Referee: Joshua Encarnación

September 8 22	Colorado Springs Switchbacks FC	2–0	Real Monarchs SLC	Colorado Springs, Colorado
7:00 P.M.	Barry 57'; Torres 65'	Report		Stadium: Weidner Field; Attendance: 4,792

September 11 23	Colorado Springs Switchbacks FC	1–1	Rio Grande Valley FC Toros	Colorado Springs, Colorado
7:00 P.M.	Ockford (red card) 45'; Mahoney 90+1'	Report	López 80'	Stadium: Weidner Field; Attendance: 6,474; Referee: Elijio Arreguin

September 15 24	Colorado Springs Switchbacks FC	0–0	El Paso Locomotive FC	Colorado Springs, Colorado
7:00 P.M.		Report		Stadium: Weidner Field; Attendance: 5,370; Referee: William Hoffman

September 18 25	Rio Grande Valley FC Toros	1–2	Colorado Springs Switchbacks FC	Edinburg, Texas
4:30 P.M.	Ycaza 26'	Report	Barry 49', 81'	Stadium: H-E-B Park; Attendance: 2,905; Referee: Lukasz Szpala

September 25 26	Colorado Springs Switchbacks FC	3–1	Austin Bold FC	Colorado Springs, Colorado
7:00 P.M.	Beckford 8'; Barry 41'; Lewis 83'	Report	Báez 17'	Stadium: Weidner Field; Attendance: 6,355; Referee: Jonathan Bilinski

===== October =====
October 2 27	Colorado Springs Switchbacks FC	1–1	El Paso Locomotive FC	Colorado Springs, Colorado
6:00 P.M.	Bahner 90+1' (o.g.)	Report	Carrijó 81'	Stadium: Weidner Field; Attendance: 7,268; Referee: Gerald Flores

October 8 28	Real Monarchs SLC	0–0	Colorado Springs Switchbacks FC	Herriman, Utah
5:00 P.M.		Report		Stadium: Zions Bank Stadium; Attendance: 1,497

October 13 29	El Paso Locomotive FC	4–2	Colorado Springs Switchbacks FC	El Paso, Texas
6:00 P.M.	Zacarías 21'; King 61'; Solignac 86'; Luna 90+7'	Report	Barry 5'; Beckford 35'	Stadium: Southwest University Park; Attendance: 5,055; Referee: Jeremy Scheer

October 16 30	Colorado Springs Switchbacks FC	1–0	Rio Grande Valley FC Toros	Colorado Springs, Colorado
6:00 P.M.	Amang 90+4'	Report		Stadium: Weidner Field; Attendance: 8,023; Referee: Joshua Encarnación

October 22 31	Real Monarchs SLC	1–1	Colorado Springs Switchbacks FC	Herriman, Utah]
5:00 P.M.	Benitez (red card) 13'; Adams 47'	Report	Lewis 90+5'; Toure (yellow card) 76' (yellow-red card) 90+5'	Stadium: Zions Bank Stadium; Attendance: 1,818

October 30 32	San Antonio FC	3–0	Colorado Springs Switchbacks FC	San Antonio, Texas
6:30 P.M.	Edwards 5' (o.g.); Gallegos 46'; Ford 68'	Report		Stadium: Toyota Field; Attendance: 5,232; Referee: Matthew Corrigan

===== Playoffs =====
As the fifth seed in the Western Conference, the Switchbacks clinched a spot in the playoffs, matched up away against Orange County SC. Despite being a man up for over two thirds of the match, the Switchbacks would fall to the eventual champions, bowing out in the conference quarter-finals

November 6, 2021 Conference Quarter-finals	Orange County SC	1–0	Colorado Springs Switchbacks FC	Irvine, California
7:00 PM PDT	Kuningas (yellow card) 20'; Kiernan (red card) 31'; Damus 45+1'; Orozco (yellow card) 50'; Romero (yellow card) 90+6'	Report	Ockford (yellow card) 27'; Beckford (yellow card) 66'; Hodge (yellow card) 86'	Stadium: Championship Soccer Stadium; Attendance: 4,194; Referee: Lukasz Szpala

=== U.S. Open Cup ===
Due to the COVID-19 pandemic, the US Open Cup wasn't hosted for the second year in a row. Had the US Open Cup been hosted, the Switchbacks wouldn't have qualified, as only the previous year's USL Championship playoff semi-finalists would've qualified for the modified format.
