= 2023 Colorado Springs Switchbacks FC season =

Colorado Springs Switchbacks FC
2023 season
- President: Martin Ragain
- Head coach: Stephen Hogan
- Stadium: Weidner Field
- USL Championship: Western Conference: 5th
- USL Playoffs: Conference Quarter-Finals
- U.S. Open Cup: Second Round
Home colors	Away colors	Third colors

The 2023 Colorado Springs Switchbacks FC season was the club's ninth season of existence, and their ninth season in the Western Conference of the USL Championship, the second tier of the United States soccer league system.

During the off-season, the Switchbacks underwent a coaching change. Following the conclusion of the 2022 season, manager Brendan Burke, who had led the club since the 2021 season, departed the club in January 2023 to assume the role of top assistant with Major League Soccer club Houston Dynamo FC. He was subsequently replaced by Stephen Hogan, who worked as an assistant coach for the club since 2021.

== Players ==
As of August 3, 2023

No.	Pos.	Player	Nation
1	GK	MEX	Christian Herrera
4	DF	HAI	Delentz Pierre (on loan from Real Salt Lake)
5	DF	USA	Matt Mahoney
7	MF	JAM	Tyreek Magee
8	MF	CAN	Jay Chapman
9	FW	JAM	Romario Williams
10	MF	USA	Zach Zandi
11	FW	JAM	Deshane Beckford
12	MF	USA	Drew Skundrich
13	MF	USA	Steven Echevarria
14	DF	HAI	Duke Lacroix
15	DF	USA	Jimmy Ockford
17	MF	ESA	Jairo Henríquez
21	FW	USA	Aaron Wheeler
22	DF	GER	Dennis Erdmann
23	DF	SWE	Oskar Ågren (on loan from San Jose Earthquakes)
24	MF	NOR	Jonas Fjeldberg
27	FW	PAN	Juan Tejada
33	GK	USA	Joe Kuzminsky
41	DF	NZL	James Musa
44	MF	USA	Marco Rios
46	MF	USA	Dillon Clarke
50	DF	USA	Luke Schultz
68	DF	USA	Rylan Smith
80	MF	JAM	Speedy Williams
99	FW	JAM	Maalique Foster

USL academy contract

== Competitions ==
=== USL Championship ===
==== Standings ====
Pos	Team	Pld	W	L	T	GF	GA	GD	Pts	Qualification
3	San Diego Loyal SC	34	16	9	9	61	43	+18	57	Playoffs
4	San Antonio FC	34	14	6	14	63	38	+25	56	Playoffs
5	Colorado Springs Switchbacks FC	34	16	13	5	49	42	+7	53	Playoffs
6	Phoenix Rising FC (C)	34	12	10	12	54	41	+13	48	Playoffs
7	El Paso Locomotive FC	34	13	13	8	41	51	−10	47	Playoffs

Source: USL Championship Standings
Rules for classification: 1) head-to-head points; 2) head-to-head goal differential; 3) points-per game within conference; 4) total wins; 5) total goal differential; 6) total goals scored; 7) points earned against top four Conference finishers; 8) disciplinary points; 9) coin toss or drawing of lots
(C) Champions

==== Match results ====
On January 27, 2022, the Colorado Springs Switchbacks FC released their full schedule for the 2022 season.

All times are in Mountain Standard Time.

===== March =====
March 15 1	El Paso Locomotive FC	1–2	Colorado Springs Switchbacks FC	El Paso, Texas
7:00 P.M.	Zacarías 48'	Report	Henríquez 2'; Lacroix 90+2'	Stadium: Southwest University Park; Attendance: 5,516; Referee: Matthew Thompson

March 18 2	Colorado Springs Switchbacks FC	1–1	Hartford Athletic	Colorado Springs, Colorado
7:00 P.M.	Zandi 88'	Report	Amoh 70'	Stadium: Weidner Field; Attendance: 6,248; Referee: Calin Radosav

March 25 3	San Antonio FC	1–0	Colorado Springs Switchbacks FC	San Antonio, Texas
8:30 P.M.	Abu 83'	Report		Stadium: Toyota Field; Attendance: 7,938; Referee: Brandon Stevis

===== April =====
April 1 4	Loudoun United FC	0–1	Colorado Springs Switchbacks FC	Leesburg, Virginia
9:00 P.M.		Report	Williams 5'	Stadium: Segra Field; Attendance: 2,379; Referee: Jeremy Scheer

April 8 5	Colorado Springs Switchbacks FC	1–0	Pittsburgh Riverhounds SC	Colorado Springs, Colorado
6:00 P.M.	Williams 80'	Report	Mertz (red card) 48'; Ordoñez (yellow card) 85' (yellow-red card) 90+5'	Stadium: Weidner Field; Attendance: 7,567; Referee: Ricardo Fierro

April 15 6	Sacramento Republic FC	4–0	Colorado Springs Switchbacks FC	Sacramento, California
9:00 P.M.	Cicerone 8'; Viader 37'; Fernandes 45+1'; Archimede 90+6'	Report	King (yellow card) 4' (yellow-red card) 79'	Stadium: Heart Health Park; Attendance: 8,916; Referee: Thomas Snyder

April 22 7	Colorado Springs Switchbacks FC	2–1	New Mexico United	Colorado Springs, Colorado
7:00 P.M.	Swartz 67' (o.g.); Skundrich 70'	Report	Moar 46'	Stadium: Weidner Field; Attendance: 7,820; Referee: Joshua Encarnación

April 29 8	Charleston Battery	1–2	Colorado Springs Switchbacks FC	Mt. Pleasant, South Carolina
: P.M.	Archer 27'	Report	Foster 4'; Echevarria 15'	Stadium: Patriots Point Soccer Complex; Attendance: 3,062; Referee: John Griggs

===== May =====
May 5 9	Colorado Springs Switchbacks FC	2–3	El Paso Locomotive FC	Colorado Springs, Colorado
7:00 P.M.	Ockford 61'; Williams 88' (pen.)	Report	Solignac 10'; Petrović 13'; Sonupe 74'	Stadium: Weidner Field; Attendance: 8,023; Referee: Elvis Osmanovic

May 13 10	Memphis 901 FC	2–1	Colorado Springs Switchbacks FC	Memphis, Tennessee
6:00 P.M.	Fernando 10', 89'; Lapa (red card)	Report	R. Williams 29'	Stadium: AutoZone Park; Attendance: 3,450; Referee: Benjamin Meyer

May 20 11	Indy Eleven	1–0	Colorado Springs Switchbacks FC	Indianapolis, Indiana
6:00 PM	Rebellón 16'	Report		Stadium: Carroll Stadium; Attendance: 9,688; Referee: Calin Radosav

May 27 12	Tampa Bay Rowdies	2–1	Colorado Springs Switchbacks FC	St. Petersburg, Florida
6:30 P.M.	Herrera 7' (o.g.); Williams 44'	Report	Henríquez 90+2'	Stadium: Al Lang Stadium; Attendance: 6,186; Referee: Luis Arroyo

===== June =====
June 2 13	Colorado Springs Switchbacks FC	0–1	Oakland Roots SC	Colorado Springs, Colorado
7:00 PM		Report	Rodriguez 12'	Stadium: Weidner Field; Attendance: 8,023; Referee: Ricardo Fierro

June 10 14	Colorado Springs Switchbacks FC	4–0	Orange County SC	Colorado Springs, Colorado
7:00 P.M.	Skundrich 28'; Williams 60'; Henríquez 71' (pen.); Rios 74'	Report		Stadium: Weidner Field; Attendance: 6,930; Referee: Olvin Oliva

June 17 15	Colorado Springs Switchbacks FC	2–0	Las Vegas Lights FC	Colorado Springs, Colorado
7:00 P.M.	Williams 37'; Foster 52'	Report		Stadium: Weidner Field; Attendance: 8,023; Referee: Alejo Calume

June 21 16	Rio Grande Valley FC Toros	1–0	Colorado Springs Switchbacks FC	Edinburg, Texas
8:00 P.M.	López 64'	Report		Stadium: H-E-B Park; Attendance: 3,088; Referee: Gerald Flores

June 24 17	New Mexico United	2–1	Colorado Springs Switchbacks FC	Albuquerque, New Mexico
7:00 P.M.	Moreno 33'; Bruce 48'	Report	Ryden 71' (o.g.)	Stadium: Isotopes Park; Attendance: 9,786; Referee: Alexis Da Silva

===== July =====
July 1 18	Colorado Springs Switchbacks FC	2–0	Miami FC	Colorado Springs, Colorado
7:00 P.M.	Beckford 59'; Williams 75'	Report		Stadium: Weidner Field; Attendance: 7,926; Referee: Nabil Bensalah

July 4 19	Colorado Springs Switchbacks FC	4–0	Monterey Bay FC	Colorado Springs, Colorado
7:00 P.M.	Tejada 2'; Echevarria 46', 83'; Williams 73' (pen.)	Report		Stadium: Weidner Field; Attendance: 8,023; Referee: Matthew Thompson

July 14 20	Colorado Springs Switchbacks FC	0–5	San Diego Loyal SC	Colorado Springs, Colorado
7:00 P.M.			Perez 1'; Bodily 9', 30'; Moshobane 45+3'; Collier 70'	Stadium: Weidner Field; Attendance: 8,023; Referee: Eric Tattersall

July 22 21	Phoenix Rising FC	1–1	Colorado Springs Switchbacks FC	Phoenix, Arizona
8:30 P.M.	Trejo 44'	Report	Tejada 42'	Stadium: Phoenix Rising Soccer Stadium; Referee: Calin Radosav

July 30 22	San Diego Loyal FC	2–0	Colorado Springs Switchbacks FC	San Diego, California
4:00 P.M.	Corona 41'; Damus 90+2'	Report		Stadium: Torero Stadium; Attendance: 5,057; Referee: Elijio Arreguin

===== August =====
August 4 23	Colorado Springs Switchbacks FC	2–1	Birmingham Legion FC	Colorado Springs, Colorado
7:00 P.M.	Beckford 11'; Tejada 84'	Report	Brett 58'	Stadium: Weidner Field; Attendance: 8,023; Referee: Natalie Simon

August 9 24	Colorado Springs Switchbacks FC	1–1	FC Tulsa	Colorado Springs, Colorado
7:00 P.M.	Fjeldberg 79'	Report	Yosef 42'	Stadium: Weidner Field; Attendance: 8,023; Referee: Elvis Osmanovic

August 19 25	Oakland Roots SC	2–3	Colorado Springs Switchbacks FC	Hayward, California
8:00 PM	Diaz 25'; Peláez 45+5' (pen.)	Report	Foster 5'; Magee 40', 58'	Stadium: Pioneer Stadium; Attendance: 4,017; Referee: Alexis Da Silva

August 26 26	Monterey Bay FC	2–1	Colorado Springs Switchbacks FC	Seaside, California
8:00 P.M.	Fehr (yellow card) 56'; Volesky 89' (pen.), 90+4' (pen.)	Report	Foster (yellow card) 33' (yellow-red card) 59'; Fjeldberg (yellow card) 45' (yellow-red card) 64'; Chapman 77'; Musa (red card) 90+7'	Stadium: Cardinale Stadium; Attendance: 5,720; Referee: Matthew Corrigan

===== September =====
September 2 27	Colorado Springs Switchbacks FC	2–3	Louisville City FC	Colorado Springs, Colorado
7:00 P.M.	Williams 41', 90' (pen.)	Report	Gonzalez 22'; Wynder 49'; Pouwels 88'	Stadium: Weidner Field; Attendance: 7,457; Referee: Gerald Flores

September 9 28	Colorado Springs Switchbacks FC	1–1	San Antonio FC	Colorado Springs, Colorado
7:00 P.M.	Rios 84'	Report	Patiño 71'	Stadium: Weidner Field; Attendance: 8,023; Referee: Calin Radosav

September 15 29	Orange County SC	0–1	Colorado Springs Switchbacks FC	Irvine, California
8:00 P.M.		Report	Magee 84'	Stadium: Championship Soccer Stadium; Attendance: 4,344; Referee: Sergii Demianchuk

September 23 30	Colorado Springs Switchbacks FC	2–0	Sacramento Republic FC	Colorado Springs, Colorado
6:00 P.M.	Williams 29'; Henríquez 90+2'	Report		Stadium: Weidner Field; Attendance: 8,023; Referee: Brad Jensen

September 27 31	Detroit City FC	0–3	Colorado Springs Switchbacks FC	Hamtramck, Michigan
5:30 P.M.	Bryant (yellow card) 53' (yellow-red card) 58'	Report	Tejada 15'; Williams 24', 49'	Stadium: Keyworth Stadium; Attendance: 5,021; Referee: Kevin Broadley

September 30 32	Colorado Springs Switchbacks FC	1–1	Rio Grande Valley FC Toros	Colorado Springs, Colorado
7:00 P.M.	Williams 69' (pen.)	Report	Davila 90+8'	Stadium: Weidner Field; Attendance: 7,889; Referee: Olvin Oliva

===== October =====
October 7 33	Las Vegas Lights FC	2–3	Colorado Springs Switchbacks FC	Las Vegas, Nevada
8:30 P.M.	Bagley 48'; Stauffer 77'	Report	Henríquez 41'; Foster 57'; Williams 62' (pen.)	Stadium: Cashman Field; Referee: Austin Saini

October 14 34	Colorado Springs Switchbacks FC	2–0	Phoenix Rising FC	Colorado Springs, Colorado
7:00 P.M.	Tejada 12'; Henríquez 29'	Report		Stadium: Weidner Field; Attendance: 8,023; Referee: John Griggs

===== Playoffs =====
As the fifth seed in the Western Conference, the Switchbacks were granted a spot in the 2023 USL Championship playoffs, first matched up away against San Antonio FC. Similar to the previous season's playoffs where the Switchbacks lost away in San Antonio, the same fate was realized by the Switchbacks, as they lost in a shutout to end their 2023 season.

October 21, 2023 Conference Quarter-Finals	San Antonio FC	1–0	Colorado Springs Switchbacks	San Antonio, Texas
8:00 PM CDT	Garcia (yellow card) 19'; Hernández 55'; PC (yellow card) 82'	Report	Tejada (yellow card) 45'; Lacroix (yellow card) 60'; Mahoney (yellow card) 78'; Musa (yellow card) 90'	Stadium: Toyota Field; Attendance: 7,304; Referee: Alexis Da Silva

=== U.S. Open Cup ===
As a member of the USL Championship, the Switchbacks entered the U.S. Open Cup in the Second Round, matched up against third-division USL League One and fellow Coloradan team Northern Colorado Hailstorm FC at home. Similar to the previous year's U.S. Open Cup, where the Switchbacks lost at home to the Hailstorm in added extra time, the Switchbacks suffered an upset at home and exited the U.S. Open Cup in the same round they entered in.

April 5 Second Round	Colorado Springs Switchbacks FC (USLC) (Colorado)	1–3 (a.e.t.)	Northern Colorado Hailstorm FC (USL1)	Colorado Springs, Colorado
7:00 MDT	Skundrich 82'	Report	Amann 88'; Benamna 95'; Hernández 107'	Stadium: Weidner Field; Attendance: 200; Referee: Adam Rice
