= List of Colorado Springs Switchbacks FC seasons =

Colorado Springs Switchbacks FC is an American soccer club that competes in the USL Championship, the second division of American soccer. Established in 2015, the club began play in the third tier USL, before moving up with USL's sanctioniong as a second tier league. The following list covers each season of the club's existence, documenting its performance in all competitive competitions.

== Key ==
Key to competitions

- USL Championship (USL/USLC) – The second division of soccer in the United States, established in 2010 and previously known as USL and USL Pro. The Championship was the third division of American soccer from its founding until its elevation to second division status in 2017.
- USL Cup - The interleague cup competition contested by the USL professional tiers, beginning in 2024 with USL League One only, and expanding the following year.
- U.S. Open Cup (USOC) – The premier knockout cup competition in US soccer, first contested in 1914.
- CONCACAF Champions Cup (CCC) – The premier competition in North American soccer since 1962.

Key to colors and symbols

1st or W	Winners
2nd or RU	Runners-up
Last	Wooden Spoon
♦	League Golden Boot

Key to league record

- Season = The year and article of the season
- Tier = Level on pyramid
- League = League name
- Conf/Div = Conference or division within the league
- Pld = Games played
- W = Games won
- D = Games drawn
- L = Games lost
- GF = Goals scored
- GA = Goals against
- Pts = Points
- Conf = Conference position
- Ovr = Overall league position

Key to cup record

- DNP = Did not participate
- DNQ = Did not qualify
- NH = Competition not held or canceled
- R1 = First round
- R2 = Second round
- R3 = Third round
- R4 = Fourth round
- Ro32 = Round of 32
- Ro16 = Round of 16
- QF = Quarterfinals
- SF = Semifinals
- RU = Runners-up
- W = Winners

== Seasons ==
Season	Tier	League	Conf/Div	Record							Position		Playoffs	USOC	USL Cup	Avg. Attendance	Top goalscorer	
Season	Tier	League	Conf/Div	Pld	W	D	L	GF	GA	Pts	Conf	Ovr	Playoffs	USOC	USL Cup	Avg. Attendance	Name	Goals
2015	3	USL	Western	20	14	4	10	53	35	46	3rd	5th	QF	R4	-	2,723	(United States) Luke Vercollone	14
2016	3	USL	Western	30	14	7	9	37	27	49	3rd	8th	R1	R4	-	3,152	(United States) Mike Seth	8
2017	2	USL	Western	32	12	8	12	55	51	44	9th	14th	DNQ	R3	-	3,389	(Jamaica) Kevaughn Frater	12
2018	2	USL	Western	34	11	6	17	36	39	39	11th	23rd	DNQ	R3	-	3,804	(Guam) Shane Malcolm (United States) Jordan Burt	6
2019	2	USLC	Western	34	7	6	21	31	65	27	18th	35th	DNQ	R3	-	4,005	(United States) Jordan Burt	7
2020	2	USLC	Group C	16	2	7	7	19	28	13	3rd	27th	DNQ	NH	-	0 (Note: Due to the COVID-19 pandemic, fans were not allowed to attend)	(United States) Christian Volesky	5
2021	2	USLC	Western/Mountain	32	13	10	9	60	50	49	5th	12th	R1	NH	-	6,271	(Guinea) Hadji Barry	25
2022	2	USLC	Western	34	17	13	4	59	53	55	3rd	9th	SF	R2	-	7,199	(Guinea) Hadji Barry	16
2023	2	USLC	Western	34	16	13	5	49	42	53	5th	8th	R1	R2	-	7,769	(Jamaica) Romario Williams	15
2024	2	USLC	Western	34	15	12	7	48	40	52	2nd	5th	W	Ro32	DNP	7,664	(Haiti) Ronaldo Damus	12
2025	2	USLC	Western	30	10	13	7	35	47	37	8th	16th	R1	Ro32	R1	7,065	(Jamaica) Khori Bennett	14
