= Zach Zandi =

American soccer player

Personal information
- Full name: Zachary Zandi
- Date of birth: July 18, 1996 (age 30)
- Place of birth: West Chester, Pennsylvania, U.S.
- Height: 1.67 m (5 ft 6 in)
- Position: Midfielder

Youth career
- West Chester United
- Penn Fusion SA
- Philadelphia Union

College career
Years	Team	Apps	(Gls)
2015–2018	Villanova Wildcats	63	(14)

Senior career*
Years	Team	Apps	(Gls)
2016–2018	Reading United AC	24	(2)
2019–2020	Philadelphia Union II	34	(3)
2021–2026	Colorado Springs Switchbacks	86	(12)
- * Club domestic league appearances and goals as of October 27, 2025

Zachary Zandi (born July 18, 1996) is an American former professional soccer player who played as a midfielder.

== Early life ==
Zandi played youth soccer for West Chester United and Penn Fusion Soccer Academy before joining the Philadelphia Union Academy, and attended Henderson High School. Zandi was a part of Philadelphia Union's under-17 team that won the 2012 Generation Adidas Cup.

== College career ==
Zandi played college soccer for Villanova University, where in four seasons he made 63 appearances, scored 14 goals and provided 10 assists, leading the team with seven goals scored in 2018 and receiving Big East honors throughout his collegiate career. In 2016, Zandi notably helped the Wildcats reach their first NCAA Division I Men's Soccer Tournament in program history.

== Club career ==
=== Early career ===
Zandi joined Reading United AC in 2016 while in college where he made 24 appearances, scored two goals and provided five assists in three seasons, while also making three appearances in the U.S. Open Cup.

=== Philadelphia Union II ===
Zandi was acquired by Philadelphia Union II on January 8, 2019, and made his club debut for the then Bethlehem Steel in their season opener on March 10, 2019, scoring a goal in his debut and earning USL Championship Team-of-the-Week honors for his performance.

=== Colorado Springs Switchbacks ===
On December 21, 2020, Zandi joined the Colorado Springs Switchbacks ahead of the 2021 USL Championship season. He scored his first goal for the club on July 17, 2021, in a league match against San Antonio FC. The following season, Zandi scored five goals during the regular season and provided an assist in the conference semifinal to help lead the Switchbacks to their first-ever conference final. Zandi received the number 10 jersey ahead of the 2023 season and scored a goal in their home opener on March 18, 2023, against Hartford Athletic. Zandi scored his first goal of the 2024 season on July 4, 2024, scoring a stoppage time winner in a 1–0 win against FC Tulsa. He was named to the Team of the Week after scoring the winning goal and having 100% pass accuracy against Monterey Bay on October 19, 2024. On November 10, 2024, Zandi scored his first league brace in a 2–1 extra-time win against Orange County SC during the conference semifinal to help lead the Switchbacks to the conference final, bringing his tally to 6 goals and 4 assists for the season. Zandi subsequently helped lead the Switchbacks to their first silverware in club history, securing the Western Conference title on November 16, 2024, and earning the club's first-ever appearance in the USL Championship final. On November 23, 2024, Zandi and the Switchbacks won the club's first USL Championship title with a 3–0 win in the final. At the end of the season, Zandi was named as a finalist for the league's Comeback Player of the Year award.

On February 12, 2026, Zandi announced his retirement from playing professional soccer and became Head Scout & Technical Development Coach for the Switchbacks.

== International career ==
=== Youth ===
Zandi was a pool player for the US Soccer national training center since 2010.

== Style of play ==
Zandi has been praised for his attacking movement, combinations, and ability to create scoring chances.

== Personal life ==
His sister, Sydney Zandi, played college soccer for the University of Virginia and international soccer for the United States women's national under-17, under-18 and under-19 soccer teams, including representing the United States at the 2016 FIFA U-17 Women's World Cup, as well as being named in the inaugural pre-season squad of NWSL club team San Diego Wave in 2022. His father Karl Zandi played college soccer for West Chester University and his uncle Peter played college soccer for the University of Pennsylvania.

== Career statistics ==
=== Club ===
As of November 10, 2024

Club	Season	League			National cup (Note: Appearances in US Open Cup)		Other (Note: Appearances in USL Cup)		Total	
Club	Season	Division	Apps	Goals	Apps	Goals	Apps	Goals	Apps	Goals
Bethlehem Steel FC	2019	USL Championship	30	3	1	0	—		31	3
Philadelphia Union II	2020	USL Championship	4	0	—		—		4	0
Total			34	3	1	0			35	3
Colorado Springs	2021	USL Championship	16	1	—		—		16	1
Colorado Springs	2022	USL Championship	19	5	1	0	—		20	5
Colorado Springs	2023	USL Championship	3	1	—		—		3	1
Colorado Springs	2024	USL Championship	36	6	—		—		36	6
Colorado Springs	2025	USL Championship	19	1	1	0	3	0	23	1
Colorado Springs	Total		93	14	2	0	3	0	98	14
Career total			127	17	3	0	3	0	133	17

== Honors ==
Colorado Springs Switchbacks

- Western Conference (USL Championship): 2024
- USL Championship: 2024

Individual

- 2015 Big East All-Freshman Team
- 2016 Big East All-Academic Team
- 2016 Big East Honor Roll
- 2017 Philadelphia Soccer Six Player of the Year
- 2018 All-Big East Second Team
