= Deshane Beckford =

Jamaican footballer (born 1998)

Personal information
- Date of birth: 14 April 1998 (age 28)
- Place of birth: Montego Bay, Jamaica
- Height: 1.75 m (5 ft 9 in)
- Positions: Winger; forward

Team information
- Current team: Greenville Triumph
- Number: 31

Senior career*
Years	Team	Apps	(Gls)
2017–2022	Montego Bay United	14	(3)
2018	→ Harbour View (loan)	24	(8)
2019–2020	→ Rio Grande Valley FC (loan)	22	(3)
2021	→ Colorado Springs Switchbacks (loan)	28	(5)
2022	San Antonio FC	14	(1)
2023–2024	Colorado Springs Switchbacks	32	(2)
2024–2025	Hartford Athletic	36	(4)
2025	→ Westchester SC (loan)	10	(1)
2026–	Greenville Triumph	5	(1)

International career^{‡}
2014–2015	Jamaica U17		
2019	Jamaica U23	3	(3)
2022–	Jamaica	4	(0)
- * Club domestic league appearances and goals as of 31 October 2026 ‡ National team caps and goals as of 25 October 2025

Deshane Beckford (born 14 April 1998) is a Jamaican footballer who plays as a forward for Greenville Triumph in USL League One.

== Career ==
=== Club ===
In 2015, Beckford went on trial at West Ham United in England. In 2019, Beckford joined Rio Grande Valley in the USL Championship. In April 2021, Beckford joined Colorado Springs Switchbacks on loan ahead of the 2021 season.

In 2022, Beckford signed with San Antonio FC For the 2023 season, Beckford returned to Colorado Springs Switchbacks.

==== Hartford Athletic ====
On 2 January 2024, Beckford joined fellow USL Championship club Hartford Athletic.

On 29 August 2025, Hartford loaned Beckford to Westchester SC of USL League One.

==== Greenville Triumph ====
On 10 February 2025, Beckford signed for Greenville Triumph

=== International ===
Beckford has represented Jamaica at the u17 and u23 levels. He made his senior international debut on 20 January 2022 versus Peru.

== Career statistics ==
=== International ===
As of match played June 9, 2024

Appearances and goals by national team and year
National team	Year	Apps	Goals
Jamaica	2022	1	0
Jamaica	2023	1	0
Jamaica	2024	2	0
Total		4	0
