= Sam Williams (soccer) =

American soccer player (born 2005)

Personal information
- Full name: Samuel Williams
- Date of birth: March 18, 2005 (age 21)
- Place of birth: Tenafly, New Jersey, U.S.
- Height: 5 ft 9 in (1.75 m)
- Position: Midfielder

Team information
- Current team: Colorado Springs Switchbacks (on loan from Chicago Fire)
- Number: 6

Youth career
- New York Red Bulls

College career
Years	Team	Apps	(Gls)
2022–2024	North Carolina Tar Heels	56	(6)

Senior career*
Years	Team	Apps	(Gls)
2021–2022	New York Red Bulls II	37	(1)
2023–2024	FC Motown	5	(0)
2025	Chicago Fire II	15	(0)
2025–	Chicago Fire	7	(0)
2026-	→ Colorado Springs Switchbacks (loan)	26	(1)
- * Club domestic league appearances and goals as of November 7, 2026

Sam Williams (born March 18, 2005) is an American professional soccer player who plays as a midfielder for USL Championship side Colorado Springs Switchbacks FC on loan from Major League Soccer club Chicago Fire.

== Club career ==
As part of the New York Red Bulls academy, Williams appeared for New York Red Bulls II in the USL Championship as an injury-time substitute on July 3, 2021, against Miami FC. On July 15, 2022, during a 1–0 victory over Indy Eleven, Williams became the first New York Red Bulls academy player to log more than 2,000 minutes for Red Bull II.

On January 20, 2025, Williams joined MLS Next Pro side Chicago Fire FC II on a one-year deal. On March 14, 2025, Williams' homegrown player rights were acquired from New York Red Bulls for $100,000 in General Allocation Money and he signed a homegrown deal with Chicago.

On February 13, 2026, Colorado Spring Switchbacks FC announced they had acquired Williams on loan from Chicago Fire for the 2026 USL Championship season.

== Career statistics ==
=== Club ===
As of match played 15 August 2022

Appearances and goals by club, season and competition
Club	Season	League			Cup		Other		Total	
Club	Season	Division	Apps	Goals	Apps	Goals	Apps	Goals	Apps	Goals
New York Red Bulls II	2021	USL Championship	18	0	—	—	—	—	18	0
New York Red Bulls II	2022	USL Championship	19	1	—	—	—	—	19	1
Career total			37	1	0	0	0	0	37	1
