= Isaiah Foster =

American soccer player (born 2003)

Personal information
- Date of birth: August 12, 2003 (age 23)
- Place of birth: Frederick, Maryland, United States
- Height: 5 ft 11 in (1.80 m)
- Position: Defender

Team information
- Current team: Colorado Springs Switchbacks
- Number: 12

Youth career
- 2012–2022: Bethesda SC

Senior career*
Years	Team	Apps	(Gls)
2022	Colorado Springs Switchbacks	22	(1)
2023–2024	FC Cincinnati	1	(0)
2023–2024	FC Cincinnati 2	39	(0)
2025–	Colorado Springs Switchbacks	33	(1)
- * Club domestic league appearances and goals as of November 7, 2026

Isaiah Foster (born August 12, 2003) is an American professional soccer player who plays for USL Championship club Colorado Springs Switchbacks.

== Career ==
=== Youth ===
Foster played with Bethesda SC from 2012. In 2016 he was selected for the National Identification and Development Program's ALL id2 team, where he was ranked one of the top eleven in the camp by Top Drawer Soccer. He has been on two champion teams; the Dallas SuperCopa and the Dallas Cup.

=== Professional ===
On February 17, 2022, Foster signed a professional contract with USL Championship club Colorado Springs Switchbacks. He made his professional debut on March 19, 2022, appearing as an injury-time substitute during a 1–0 win over Monterey Bay FC.

On January 5, 2023, FC Cincinnati acquired Foster via MLS Waivers. In order to acquire Foster, Cincinnati traded $50,000 in General Allocation Money to D.C. United in exchange for the number one spot in the MLS Waiver Order. After being released by Cincinnati following the 2024 season, Foster re-joined his former club Colorado Springs Switchbacks ahead of the 2025 season.

== Honors ==
FC Cincinnati

- Supporters' Shield: 2023
