= Andre Lewis (footballer) =

Jamaican footballer (born 1994)

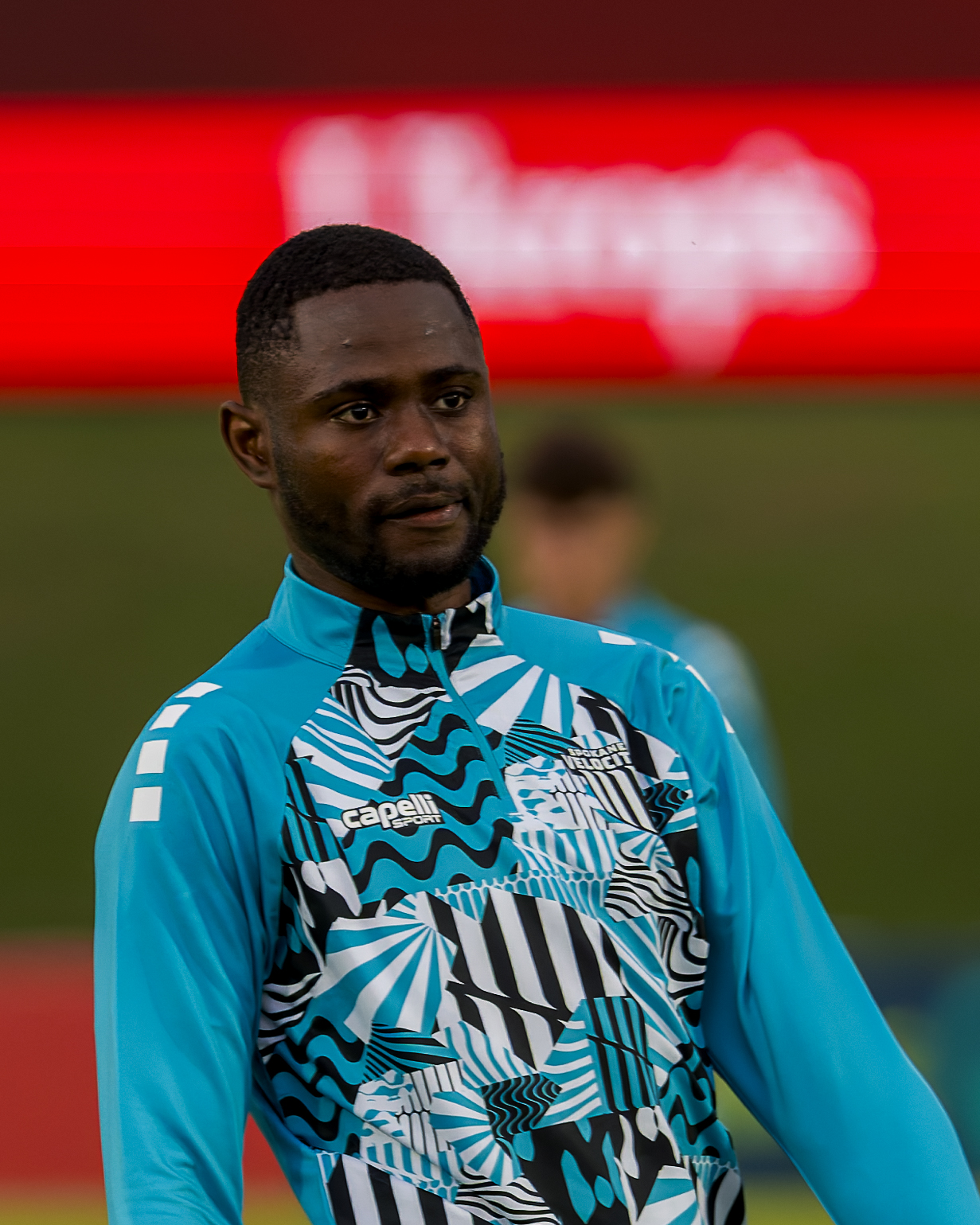

Personal information
- Full name: Lewis with Spokane Velocity in 2026
- Date of birth: 12 August 1994 (age 32)
- Place of birth: Spanish Town, Jamaica
- Height: 1.79 m (5 ft 10 1/2 in)
- Position: Midfielder

Team information
- Current team: Spokane Velocity FC
- Number: 77

Youth career
- 2010–2011: Cavalier F.C.
- 2011–2013: Portmore United

Senior career*
Years	Team	Apps	(Gls)
2013	Portmore United		
2014–2015	Vancouver Whitecaps FC	0	(0)
2014	→ Charleston Battery (loan)	14	(1)
2015	→ Whitecaps FC 2 (loan)	13	(3)
2016–2018	Portland Timbers 2	68	(1)
2019	Portmore United	22	(3)
2020–2022	Colorado Springs Switchbacks	39	(6)
2022–2023	Hartford Athletic	61	(8)
2024–	Spokane Velocity	82	(9)

International career
2010–2011	Jamaica U17	8	(2)
2012–2013	Jamaica U20	4	(0)
2015	Jamaica U23	2	(0)
2017–	Jamaica	3	(0)
- * Club domestic league appearances and goals as of 13:02, 2 November 2026 (UTC)

Andre Lewis (born 12 August 1994) is a Jamaican professional footballer who plays for Spokane Velocity FC in the USL League One and the Jamaica national team.

== Career ==
=== Club ===
Lewis began his career with Cavalier, he later played football for Jamaican club Portmore United before being spotted by MLS scouts and was entered in the 2014 MLS SuperDraft.

On 16 January 2014 Lewis was selected in the first round (seventh overall) of the 2014 MLS SuperDraft by the Vancouver Whitecaps FC. He was loaned to Vancouver's USL Pro affiliate Charleston Battery. He made his debut on 29 March 2014 in a 2–2 draw against Richmond Kickers.

In 2019, Lewis returned to Jamaica with Portmore United.

On 9 January 2020, Lewis moved back to the United States, joining USL Championship side Colorado Springs Switchbacks.

On 18 January 2022, Lewis signed for USL Championship side Hartford Athletic.

On 12 February 2024, Lewis signed with Spokane Velocity FC for its inaugural season in USL League One.

=== International ===
Lewis has played for Jamaica at the U17 and U20 levels while featuring in tournaments in Mexico. He also scored a goal for Jamaica at the 2011 U17 World Cup. Lewis made his senior national team debut versus Honduras on 16 February 2017.

== Honours ==
Portmore United

- Jamaica National Premier League: 2012, 2018–19 National Premier League
