= Weidner Field =

Soccer stadium in Colorado Springs, Colorado

- Home of the Switchbacks
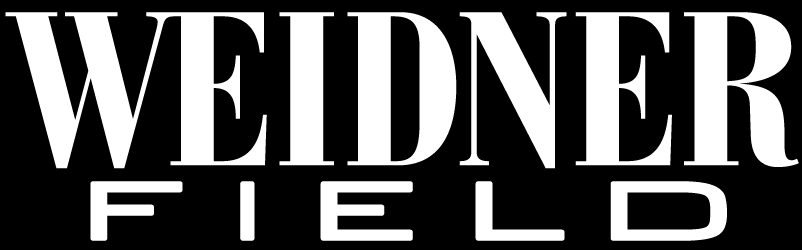

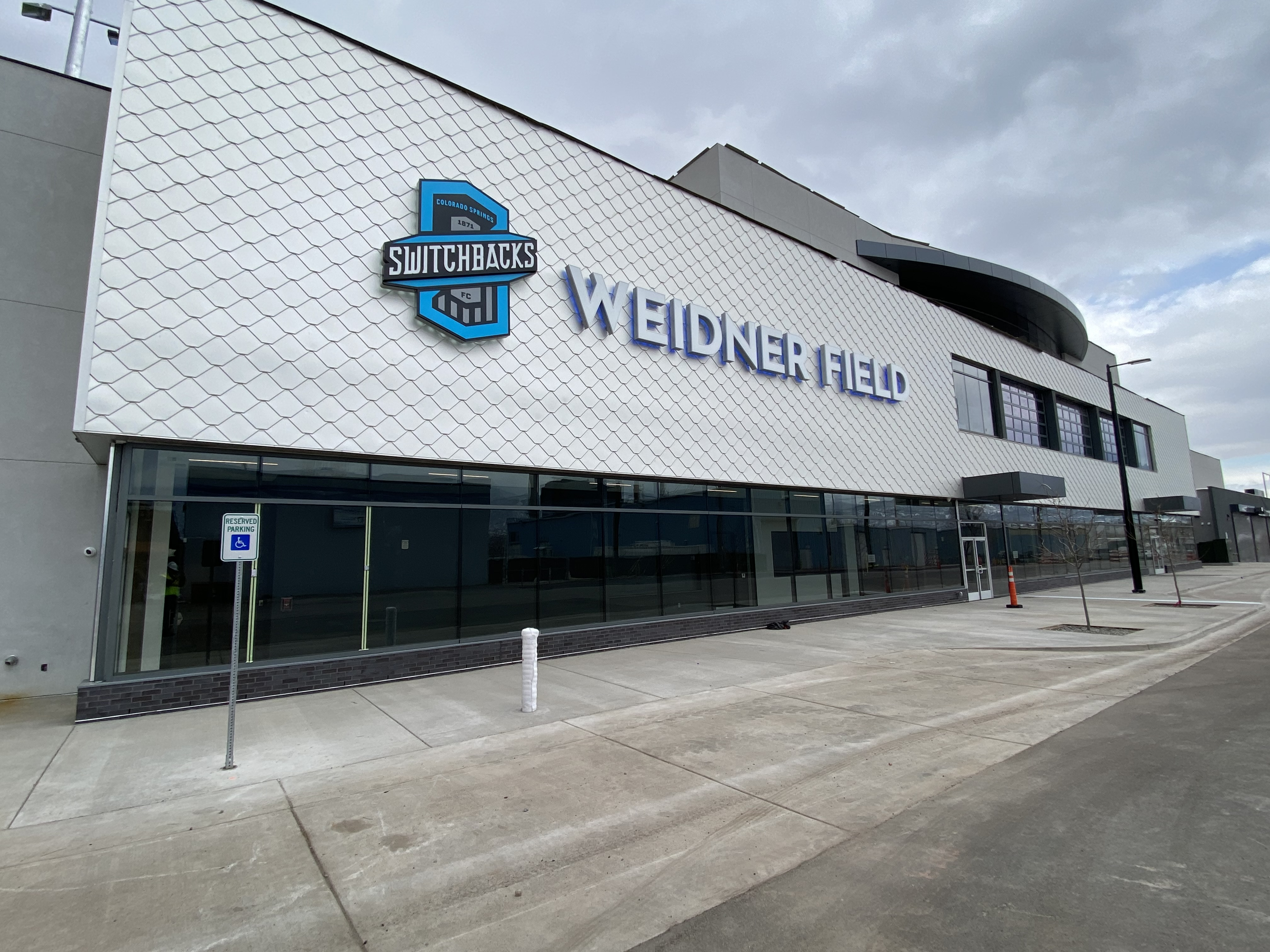
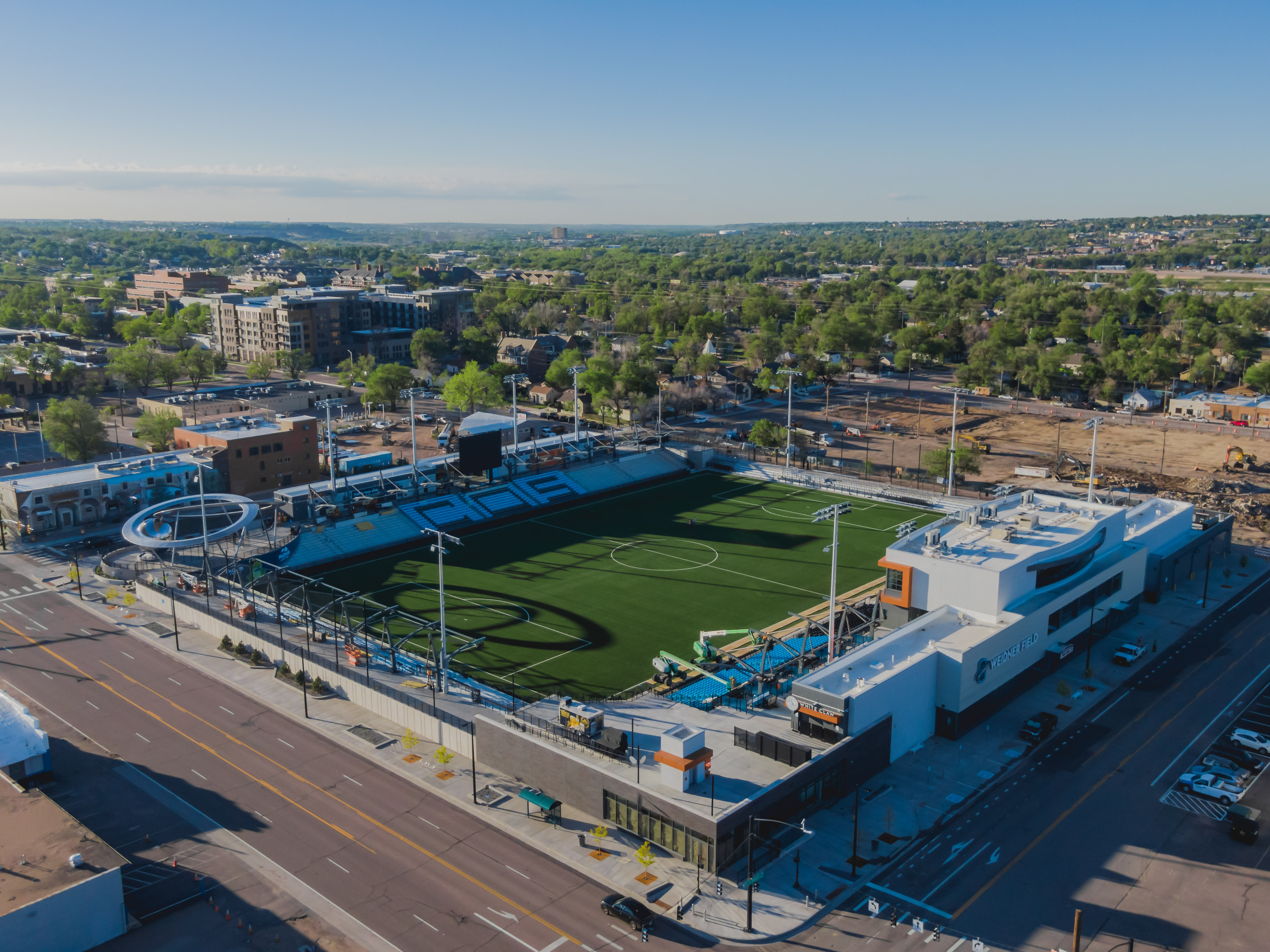
- Weidner Field, June 2021
- Interactive map of Weidner Field
- Location: 111 W. Cimarron St., Colorado Springs, Colorado
- Coordinates: 38.826363°N 104.828191°W
- Elevation: 6,035 ft (1,839 m)
- Operator: Switchbacks Entertainment
- Capacity: 8,000
- Surface: Synthetic Turf with Corkonut Infill

Construction
- Groundbreaking: December 7, 2019
- Opened: April 24, 2021
- Cost: $42,000,000
- Architects: Perkins&Will Architects

Tenants
- Colorado Springs Switchbacks FC (USLC) (2021–present); Colorado Stampede (UFL) (2027–present)

Website
- https://www.weidnerfield.com/

Weidner Field is an 8,000-seat soccer-specific stadium located in downtown Colorado Springs, Colorado, United States. It opened on April 24, 2021, and is home to the Colorado Springs Switchbacks FC who compete in the USL Championship, the second level of U.S. men's professional soccer. The stadium is situated at an altitude of 6,035 feet (1,839 m) above sea level and has the highest elevation of any stadium used by a professional team in the American soccer pyramid.

While designed for soccer, the stadium is capable of hosting other types of events, such as concerts, being able to reach a capacity as high as 15,000. The stadium replaces former Weidner Field, now known as Martin 'Ed' Ragain Field, a smaller venue in the east of the city.

== Development ==
The stadium was part of a collection of projects led by the City of Colorado Springs, which included renovations to the US Olympic & Paralympic Museum, Ed Robson Arena, William J. Hybl Sports Medicine and Performance Center, and Air Force Academy Visitor Center. Weidner Field was designed to energize the downtown area, spur adjacent real estate investment, increase tourism, and bring a sprawling community together. Plans for the new stadium were officially unveiled in July 2018. Design details were revealed in July 2019, and the ceremonial groundbreaking took place that December.

Naming rights are held by Weidner Apartment Homes, an owner of the club and sponsored the naming rights for the former stadium. The "Weidner Field" name was officially transferred from the old stadium to the new venue on October 15, 2020.

== Amenities ==
The stadium includes many unique elements, including a supporters section behind the south endline called "Base Camp," VIP suites, and a video board.

The most iconic feature of the stadium is the statue of Saturn that symbolizes the city's nickname as the Olympic City. Titled "The Epicenter" and costing $4.5 million to construct, the statue weighs around 64,000 pounds, and is 35-foot tall, 65-foot in diameter, and constructed with stainless steel. It's located near the main entrance, and lights up at night with LEDs.

In addition, Weidner Field has one of the first "Corkonut" turf fields approved by FIFA. Constructed at a cost of $750,000, the field uses coconut fibers and cork infill; It is the first of its kind to be approved in the world for professional soccer use.

Other than parking, the free downtown ZEB bus shuttle has a stop that allows fans access to the stadium via public transportation.

== Events ==
=== Soccer ===
The stadium has been the home of the Colorado Springs Switchbacks FC of the USL Championship since the 2021 USL Championship season. The first soccer-related event at the stadium was an exhibition match against Orange County SC, in front of a reduced capacity of 2,000 due to COVID-19 pandemic restrictions. The first player to score in the stadium's professional history was Hadji Barry, who scored five minutes into a 2–2 draw.

Other than professional soccer matches, the stadium also hosts both regional and state-level high school soccer competitions.

==== Major competitions ====
In December 2021, Weidner Field held host to the 2021 NCAA Division II men's soccer tournament.

On November 23, 2024, Weidner Field hosted the 2024 USL Championship final, where the Switchbacks played against Rhode Island FC, resulting in a 3–0 Switchbacks win for their first title.

=== Concerts ===
Weidner Field has a capacity of 15,000 for concerts. The stadium's first concert event was in May 27, 2021, a Latin music festival, followed the next day by a concert that included Justin Moore and Chris Janson.

Other notable performers who've played at Weidner Field include AJR, Incubus, Jason Aldean, and the Jonas Brothers, amongst others.

=== Lacrosse ===
Weidner Field played host to Week 7 of the 2021 Premier Lacrosse League season from July 30 to August 1, featuring all eight teams over five games.

== Gallery ==
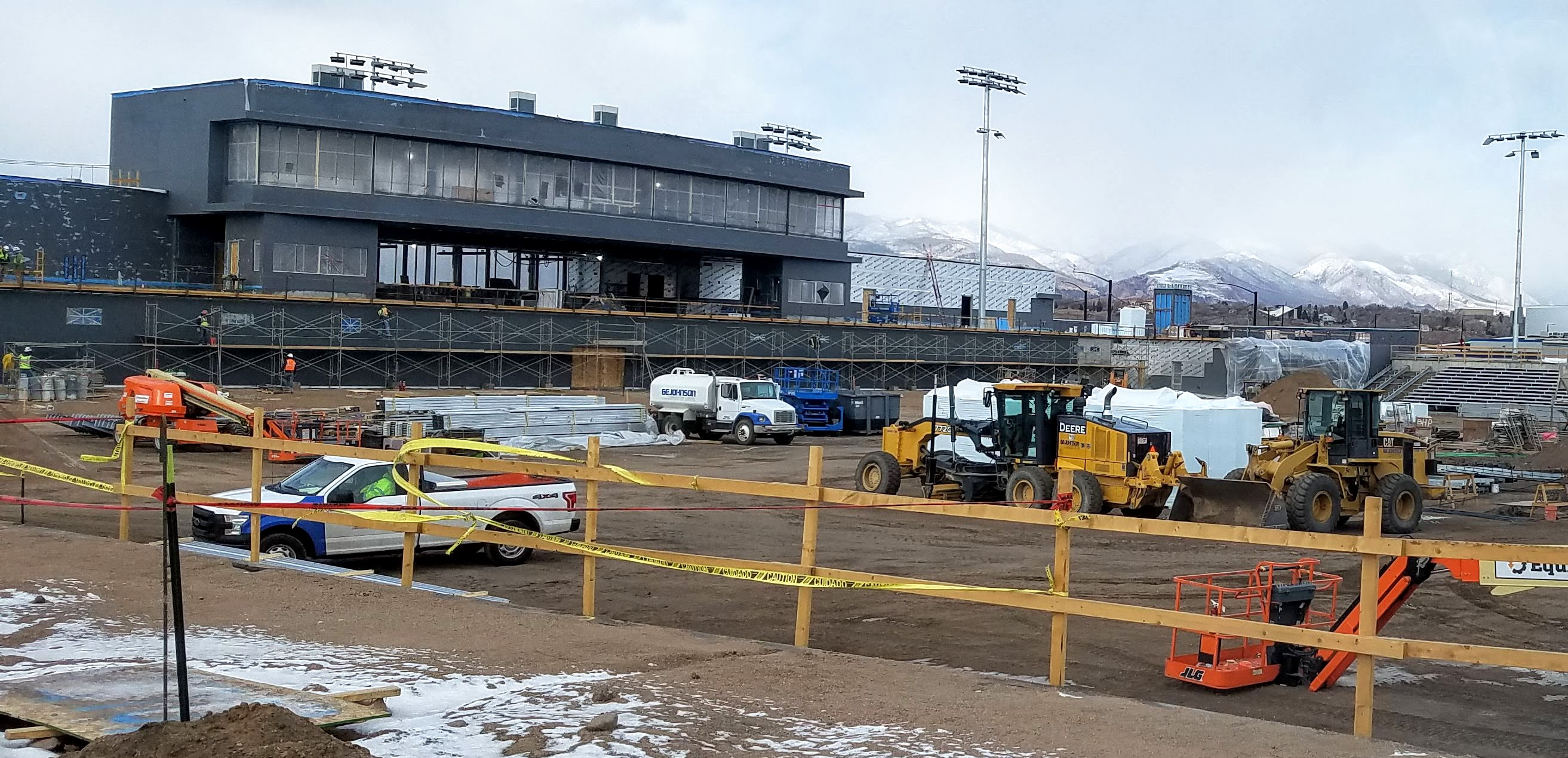
Club level seats under construction in December, 2020

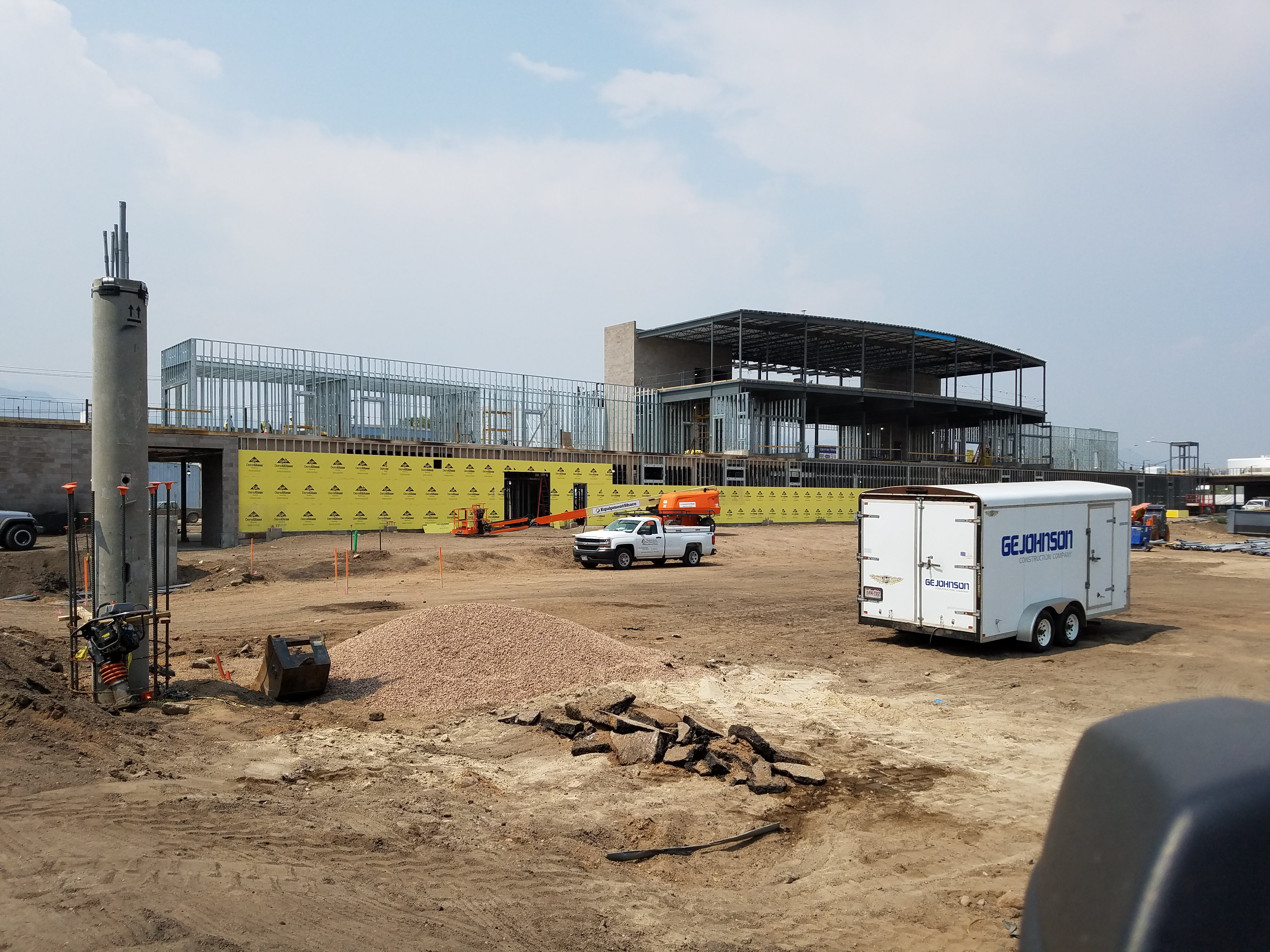
Main grandstand under construction

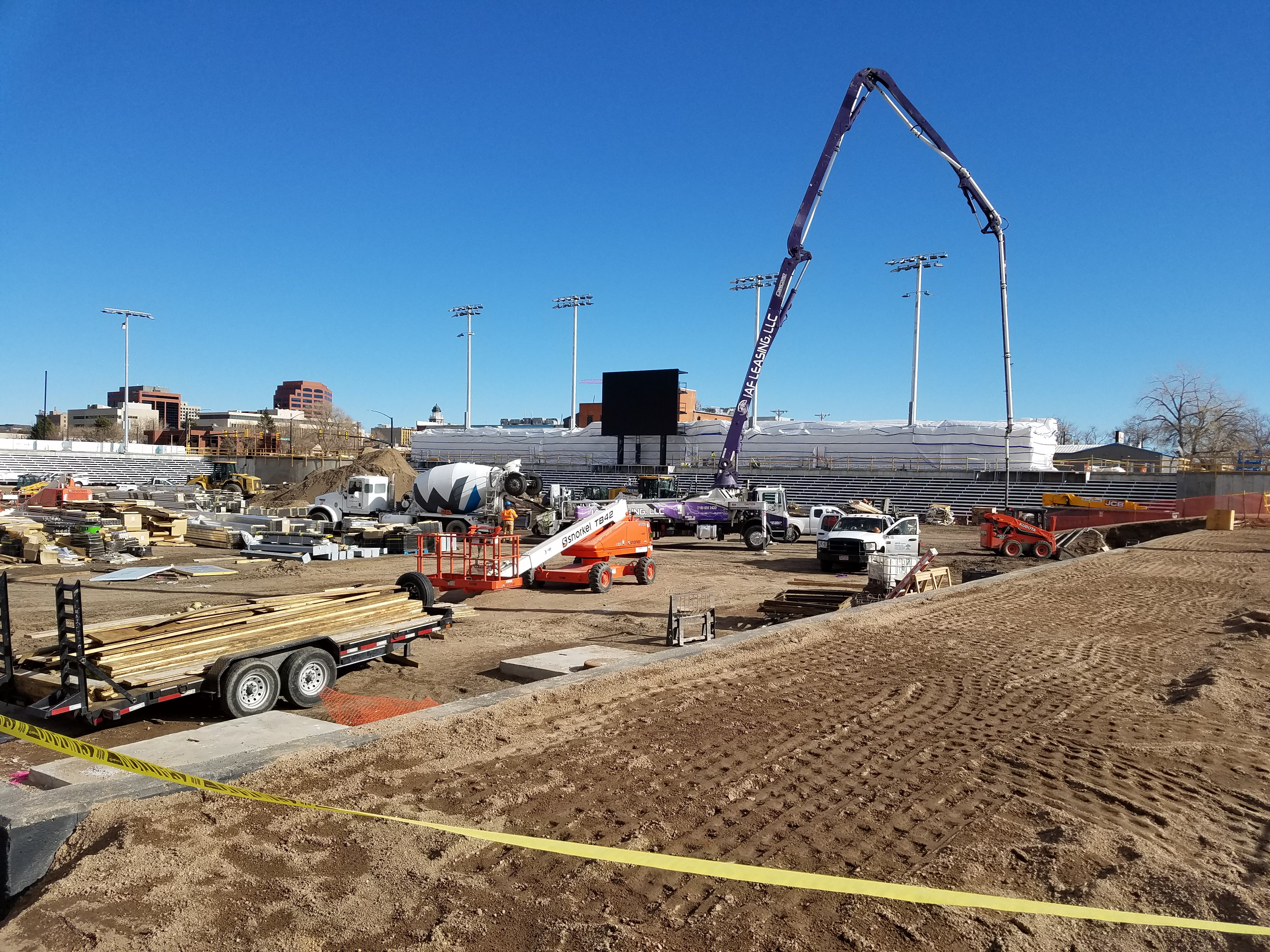
Construction on the field

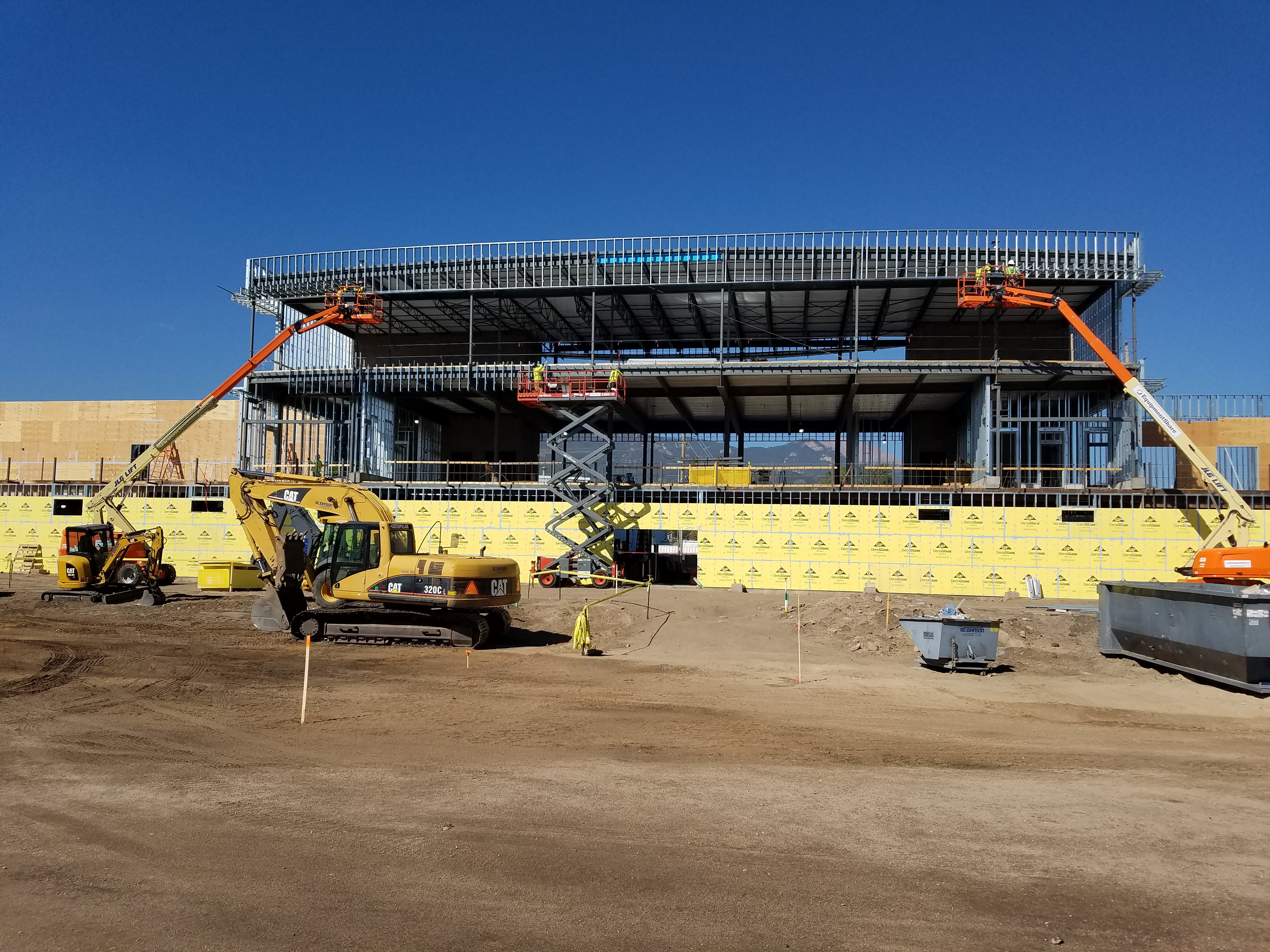
Frontal view of the main grandstands under construction
