= Christian Herrera =

Mexican footballer (born 1997)

Personal information
- Date of birth: April 20, 1997 (age 29)
- Place of birth: Las Cruces, New Mexico, United States
- Height: 1.98 m (6 ft 6 in)
- Position: Goalkeeper

Team information
- Current team: Colorado Springs Switchbacks
- Number: 1

Youth career
- 2012–2015: Real Salt Lake

Senior career*
Years	Team	Apps	(Gls)
2015–2017	Real Monarchs	0	(0)
2016	→ Pachuca II (loan)	5	(0)
2017	→ Portland Timbers 2 (loan)	0	(0)
2018	Swope Park Rangers	4	(0)
2019	Orlando City B	10	(0)
2020	Oakland Roots	3	(0)
2020	→ Tacoma Defiance (loan)	6	(0)
2021	Tacoma Defiance	18	(0)
2022–	Colorado Springs Switchbacks	103	(0)

International career
- Mexico U18
- United States U18
- United States U20
- Mexico U20
- * Club domestic league appearances and goals as of November 7, 2026

Christian Herrera (born April 20, 1997) is a professional footballer who plays as a goalkeeper for USL Championship club Colorado Springs Switchbacks. Born in the United States, he represented the Mexico national under-20 team.

== Career ==
Herrera began his career with United Soccer League side Real Monarchs after playing with the academy team of Real Salt Lake in Arizona. He had spells on loan with C.F. Pachuca and Portland Timbers 2, before signing permanently with Swope Park Rangers on February 26, 2018. Herrera was released by Swope Park on December 3, 2018.

Herrera joined USL League One side Orlando City B in February 2019. After one season in Orlando, Herrera joined NISA club Oakland Roots in February 2020.

On February 3, 2022, Herrera signed with Colorado Springs Switchbacks of the USL Championship.
