= Jonas Fjeldberg =

Norwegian footballer (born 1998)

Personal information
- Full name: Jonas Stensrud Fjeldberg
- Date of birth: 30 September 1998 (age 28)
- Place of birth: Jessheim, Norway
- Height: 1.78 m (5 ft 10 in)
- Position: Winger

Team information
- Current team: Colorado Springs Switchbacks
- Number: 7

Youth career
- –2014: Ull/Kisa

College career
Years	Team	Apps	(Gls)
2017–2021	Dayton Flyers	61	(22)

Senior career*
Years	Team	Apps	(Gls)
2014–2017	Ull/Kisa	24	(1)
2019	Dayton Dutch Lions	7	(0)
2021	FC Cincinnati	0	(0)
2021	→ Rio Grande Valley FC (loan)	8	(3)
2022–2023	Indy Eleven	19	(2)
2022	→ Rio Grande Valley FC (loan)	11	(6)
2023–	Colorado Springs Switchbacks	89	(13)

International career^{‡}
2014	Norway U16	7	(1)
2014–2015	Norway U17	5	(1)
2016	Norway U18	3	(0)
2017	Norway U19	2	(0)
- * Club domestic league appearances and goals as of 19:47, 8 November 2026 (UTC) ‡ National team caps and goals as of 12:02, 26 September 2021 (UTC)

Jonas Stensrud Fjeldberg (born 30 September 1998) is a Norwegian professional footballer who plays as a winger for USL Championship club Colorado Springs Switchbacks.

== Career ==
=== Ull/Kisa ===
Fjeldberg played from a young age with Ull/Kisa, making his first team debut in the 2014 1. divisjon. He also represented Norway as a youth international. In total, Fjeldberg made 42 appearances for the club across league and cup, scoring four goals. In 2017, he chose to decline a contract extension with the club and opted to play football and study in the United States.

=== University of Dayton & USL PDL ===
In 2017, Fjeldberg began playing college soccer at the University of Dayton. In four seasons with the Flyers, including an extended 2020–21 season due to the COVID-19 pandemic, Fjeldberg made 61 appearances, scoring 22 goals and tallying 21 assists. Whilst at college, Fjeldberg earned accolades such as Atlantic 10 Conference (A-10) All-Rookie Team in 2017, Atlantic 10 Offensive Player of the Year and A-10 First Team in both 2019 and 2020, as well as First Team All-Midwest Region in 2020.

In his 2019 season, Fjeldberg also played in the USL PDL with Dayton Dutch Lions, making seven appearances.

=== FC Cincinnati ===
On 21 January 2021, Fjeldberg was selected 54th overall in the 2021 MLS SuperDraft by FC Cincinnati. He then returned to Dayton to complete the 2020–21 season, before signing a one-year deal with the club on 20 May 2021.

Following the 2021 season, Cincinnati declined their contract option on Fjeldberg.

==== Rio Grande Valley FC (loan) ====
On 30 August 2021, Fjeldberg was loaned to USL Championship side Rio Grande Valley FC. He made his debut on 25 September 2021, scoring the winning goal in a 3–2 win over Atlanta United 2.

=== Indy Eleven ===
On 11 February 2022, it was announced that Fjeldberg has joined USL Championship side Indy Eleven ahead of their 2022 season.

==== Rio Grande Valley FC (loan) ====
Fjeldberg was again loaned to RGV on 25 July 2022, for the remainder of the 2022 USL Championship season. Rio Grande Valley sent centerback Jesús Vázquez to Indy in return.

=== Colorado Springs Switchbacks ===
On 12 May 2023, Fjeldberg was involved in a swap deal with Colorado Springs Switchbacks in exchange for Macauley King.

=== Career statistics ===
As of 15 March 2024

Club	Season	League			National Cup		Total	
Club	Season	Division	Apps	Goals	Apps	Goals	Apps	Goals
Ull/Kisa	2014	1. divisjon	7	0	—		7	0
Ull/Kisa	2015	1. divisjon	14	1	—		14	1
Ull/Kisa	2016	1. divisjon	11	1	—		11	1
Ull/Kisa	2017	1. divisjon	10	2	1	1	11	3
Ull/Kisa	Total		42	4	1	1	43	5
Dayton Dutch Lions	2019	USL League Two	7	0	2	0	9	0
FC Cincinnati	2021	MLS	0	0	—		0	0
Rio Grande Valley FC (loan)	2021	USL Championship	8	3	—		8	3
Indy Eleven	2022	USL Championship	16	2	1	0	17	2
Indy Eleven	2023	USL Championship	3	0	1	0	4	0
Indy Eleven	Total		19	2	2	0	21	2
Rio Grande Valley FC (loan)	2022	USL Championship	12	6	—		12	6
Colorado Springs	2023	USL Championship	17	1	—		17	1
Colorado Springs	2024	USL Championship	1	0	0	0	1	0
Colorado Springs	Total		18	1	0	0	18	1
Career Total			106	16	5	1	111	17
