= Colorado Springs Switchbacks FC =

American professional soccer club based in Colorado Springs

- Founded: December 5, 2013; 12 years ago
- Stadium: Weidner Field; Colorado Springs, Colorado
- Capacity: 8,000
- Owner: Weidner Apartment Homes
- President: Brad Estes
- Head coach: Alan McCann
- League: USL Championship
- 2025: 8th, Western Conference; Playoffs: Conference Quarter-finals
- Website: switchbacksfc.com
Home colors	Away colors	Third colors

Colorado Springs Switchbacks FC, commonly referred to as Switchbacks FC or simply Switchbacks, is a professional soccer team based in Colorado Springs, Colorado. The Switchbacks compete in the USL Championship (USLC) and participate in the second tier of the United States soccer league system. Founded in 2014, the team is a member of the Western Conference. The franchise is owned and operated by Weidner Apartment Homes.

The club plays at Weidner Field, which holds the record for the highest altitude professional soccer stadium in the United States. The Switchbacks won their first conference championship, and overall league championship, in the 2024 season, defeating Rhode Island FC 3-0 in the USL Championship Final.

== History ==
The Ragain family was awarded a USL Pro franchise on December 5, 2013, with plans to begin play in 2015. The team's name, the "Switchbacks", was announced on January 31, 2014, following a fan contest. The team hired Steve Trittschuh as head coach on March 11, 2014. Luke Vercollone was the first player signed by Colorado Springs in October 2014. The Ragain family chose Colorado Springs in large part because of the City for Champions vision by city leaders which included a downtown stadium concept that needed a champion of its own.

Steve Trittschuh and Luke Vercollone lead Colorado Springs to two immediate post season appearances in 2015 and 2016. A talented 2017 roster did not qualify for the playoffs followed by increasingly challenging league competitions through 2020 as the USL Championship grew.

In July 2019, the Switchbacks and Trittschuh parted ways naming assistant coach Wolde Harris the interim head coach. On September 23, Switchbacks announced the selection of Alan Koch as the next head coach. Koch's leadership of the team was cut short by the COVID-19 pandemic and a restructuring of the 2020 season thereafter returning to Canada. A stabilizing limited affiliation between the Switchbacks and Colorado Rapids between 2019 and 2021 provided the club with additional technical resources and staff including Brian Crookham that aided the transitioning club.

The Switchbacks next looked to Brendan Burke from the Philadelphia Union as head coach to lead the club in its transition downtown beginning a new phase for the franchise. Switchbacks rebranded by simplifying the original logo and colors. Burke quickly went to work restructuring the team making a 2021 playoff appearance in his first season. Player Hadji Barry tied the Championship league record for total goals scored at 25 goals earning the leagues Golden Boot award. 2022 saw the best season in franchise history at the time, making it to the Conference Finals before defeat against San Antonio FC.

After winning the final match of the 2024 regular season against Sacramento Republic FC, the Switchbacks were able to host their entire playoff run at home. With a strong home advantage, the Switchbacks were able to cruise through the entire playoffs, conceding only one goal the entire 2024 USL Championship playoffs. During this run, the club won their first trophy by winning the Western Conference against the Las Vegas Lights FC, and handily winning the 2024 USL Championship final 3–0 against Rhode Island FC.

== Club culture ==
=== Supporter Groups ===
The club has one recognized supporter group, an independent supporter group called Trailheads SG. They're typically located behind the south endline in a place titled, "Base Camp."

=== Mascot ===
Ziggy the mountain goat, debuted during the club's inaugural season, is the club's official mascot. He was chosen after a competition was hosted between artists from local high schools to create concept art for the new club's mascot to potentially win $200 for their school's art department, which was eventually won by Widefield High School. He's regarded as one of the best mascots in the USL Championship, being ranked the league's fourth best mascot in 2017.

== Stadium ==
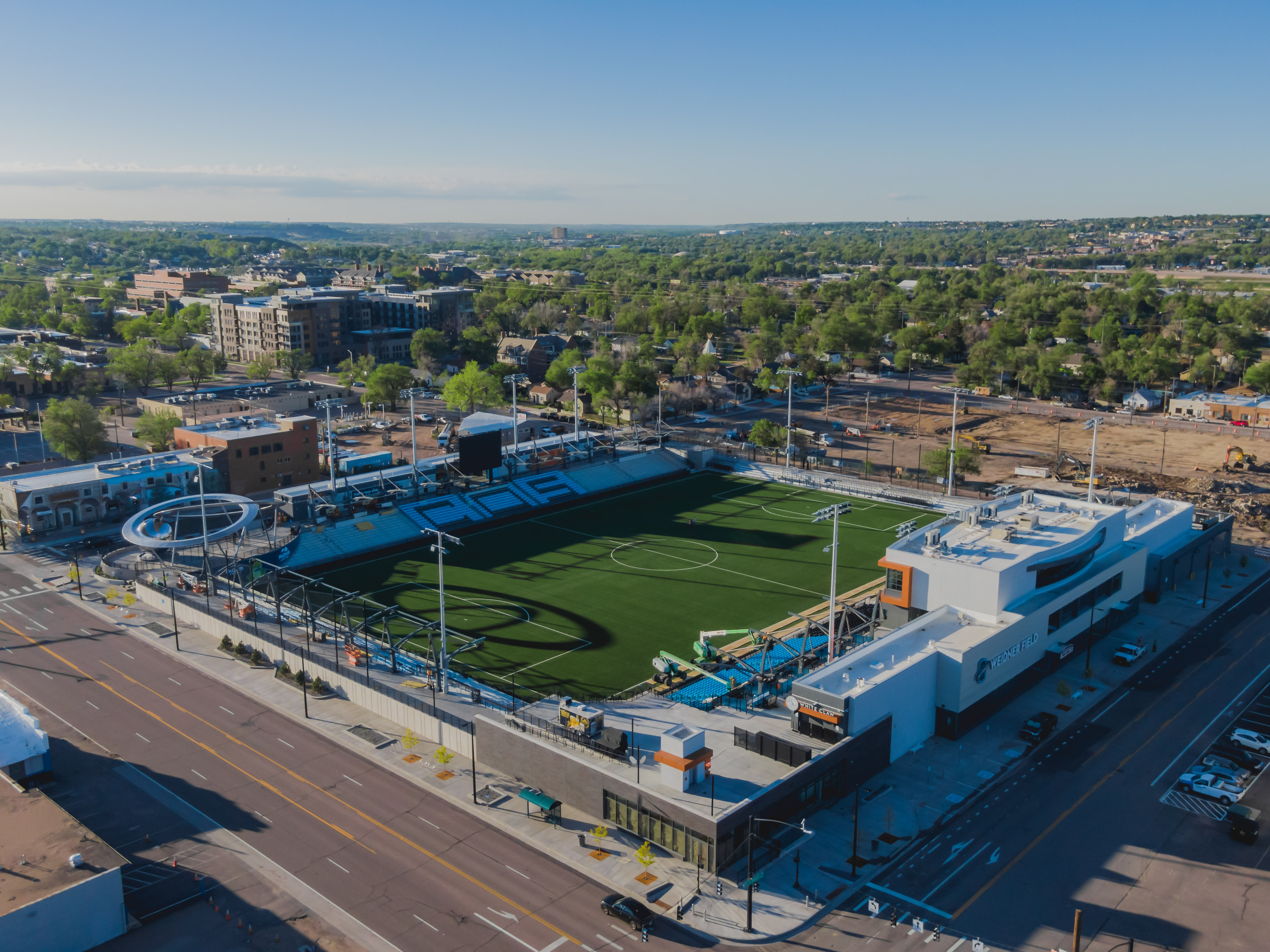
Aerial shot of Weidner Field in June 2021

The team opened an 8,000 capacity soccer stadium in downtown Colorado Springs, called Weidner Field, built by Perkins & Will Architects for the 2021 season. Having taken the name from the club's former stadium in October 2020, the stadium sits at an altitude of 6,035 feet, making Weidner Field the highest altitude professional soccer stadium in the United States. The stadium includes many unique elements, including a statue of Saturn that symbolizes the city's nickname as the Olympic City, as well as one of the first "corkonut" turf fields approved by FIFA. Plans for the stadium were officially announced by the City of Colorado Springs in July 2018. Construction began on December 7, 2019. The stadium cost was $47 million and funded by team ownership and Regional Tourism Act / City for Champions tax increment financing.

In 2014, Sand Creek Stadium (now officially known as the Switchbacks Training Field) received a $3.5 million renovation by Martin E. Ragain after signing a 10-year lease with the City of Colorado Springs to meet league minimum stadium criteria for franchises. Located at roughly 6,500 feet above sea level, the stadium was at the highest elevation of any primary home stadium for a professional team in the American soccer pyramid.

== Year-by-year ==
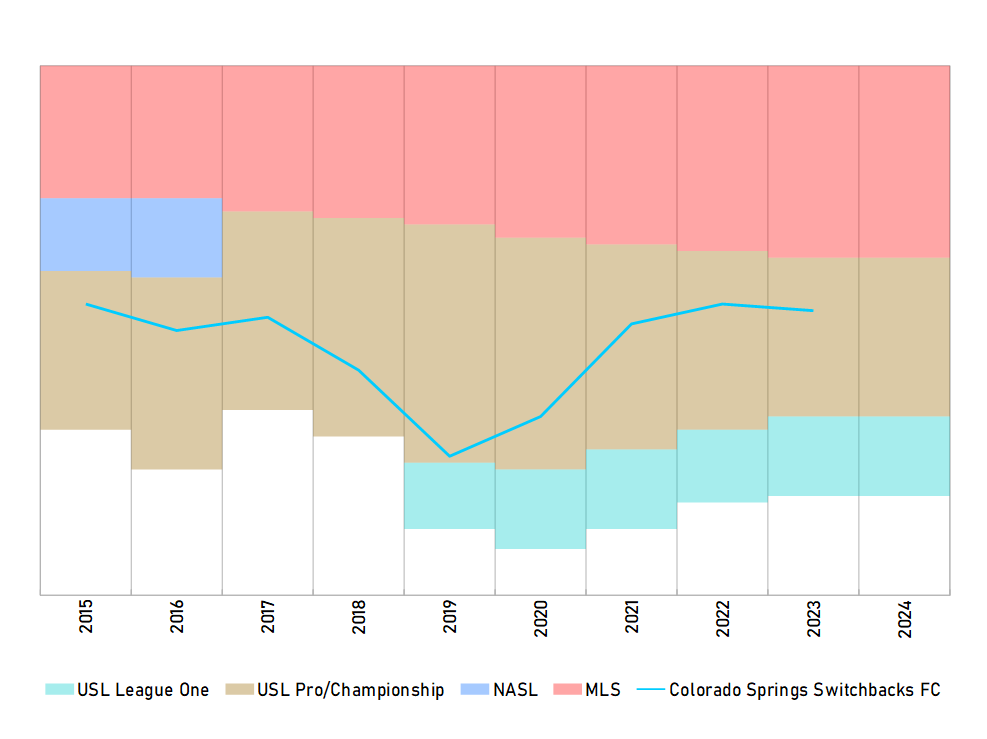
Historical chart of Switchbacks FC's regular season performance

This is a partial list of the last five seasons completed by the Switchbacks. For the full season-by-season history, see List of Colorado Springs Switchbacks FC seasons.

Season	Tier	League	Conf/Div	Record							Position		Playoffs	USOC	USL Cup	Avg. Attendance	Top goalscorer	
Season	Tier	League	Conf/Div	Pld	W	D	L	GF	GA	Pts	Conf	Ovr	Playoffs	USOC	USL Cup	Avg. Attendance	Name	Goals
2021	2	USLC	Western/Mountain	32	13	10	9	60	50	49	5th	12th	R1	NH	-	6,271	(Guinea) Hadji Barry	25
2022	2	USLC	Western	34	17	13	4	59	53	55	3rd	9th	SF	R2	-	7,199	(Guinea) Hadji Barry	16
2023	2	USLC	Western	34	16	13	5	49	42	53	5th	8th	R1	R2	-	7,769	(Jamaica) Romario Williams	15
2024	2	USLC	Western	34	15	12	7	48	40	52	2nd	5th	W	Ro32	DNP	7,664	(Haiti) Ronaldo Damus	12
2025	2	USLC	Western	30	10	13	7	35	47	37	8th	16th	R1	Ro32	R1	7,065	(Jamaica) Khori Bennett	14

== Players ==
=== Current Roster ===
As of August 20, 2026

Note: Flags indicate national team as defined under FIFA eligibility rules; some limited exceptions apply. Players may hold more than one non-FIFA nationality.

No.	Pos.	Nation	Player
1	GK	MEX	Christian Herrera
3	DF	GRN	Jabari De Coteau (on loan from Colorado Rapids 2)
5	DF	USA	Matt Mahoney
6	MF	USA	Sam Williams (on loan from Chicago Fire)
7	FW	NOR	Jonas Fjeldberg
8	MF	SLE	Frank Daroma
10	FW	USA	Adrien Perez
11	FW	USA	Bryce Jamison (on loan from Colorado Rapids)
12	DF	USA	Isaiah Foster
13	MF	PUR	Stevie Echevarria
14	DF	HAI	Duke Lacroix
15	MF	USA	Teddy Blessis
17	FW	UGA	Sadam Masereka
18	MF	USA	Aidan Rocha
20	MF	JPN	Yosuke Hanya

No.	Pos.	Nation	Player
21	MF	JAM	Tyreek Magee
22	GK	USA	Colin Shutler
23	DF	HAI	Garven Metusala
24	DF	USA	Talen Maples
25	FW	GHA	Elvis Amoh
27	FW	PAN	Juan Tejada
30	GK	USA	Sam Jones
37	DF	USA	Brennan Creek
51	MF	USA	Dane Vallenti
52	FW	USA	Griffin Price
55	FW	USA	Jesus Sandoval
70	FW	USA	Rashed Jahan
80	MF	JAM	Speedy Williams
90	FW	JAM	Khori Bennett
97	DF	MTQ	Patrick Burner

=== Out on loan ===
Note: Flags indicate national team as defined under FIFA eligibility rules; some limited exceptions apply. Players may hold more than one non-FIFA nationality.

No.	Pos.	Nation	Player
2	DF	KEN	Kisa Kiingi (on loan to Sarasota Paradise)
—	FW	CAN	Levonte Johnson (on loan to Forge FC)

=== Club captains ===
Years	Name	Nation
2015–2016	Luke Vercollone	United States
2017	Rony Argueta	United States
2018	Josh Suggs	United States
2019	Jordan Burt	United States
2020	Hiroki Kurimoto	Japan
2021–2022	Jimmy Ockford	United States
2023–present	Matt Mahoney	United States

== Staff ==
- (United States) Dean Weidner – owner
- (United States) Brad Estes – president
- Vacant – head coach
- (United States) Alan McCann – technical director & assistant coach

== Honors ==
- USL Championship
  - Champions: 2024
- USL Western Conference
  - Champions (Playoffs): 2024
