= Matt Mahoney (soccer) =

American soccer player (born 1995)

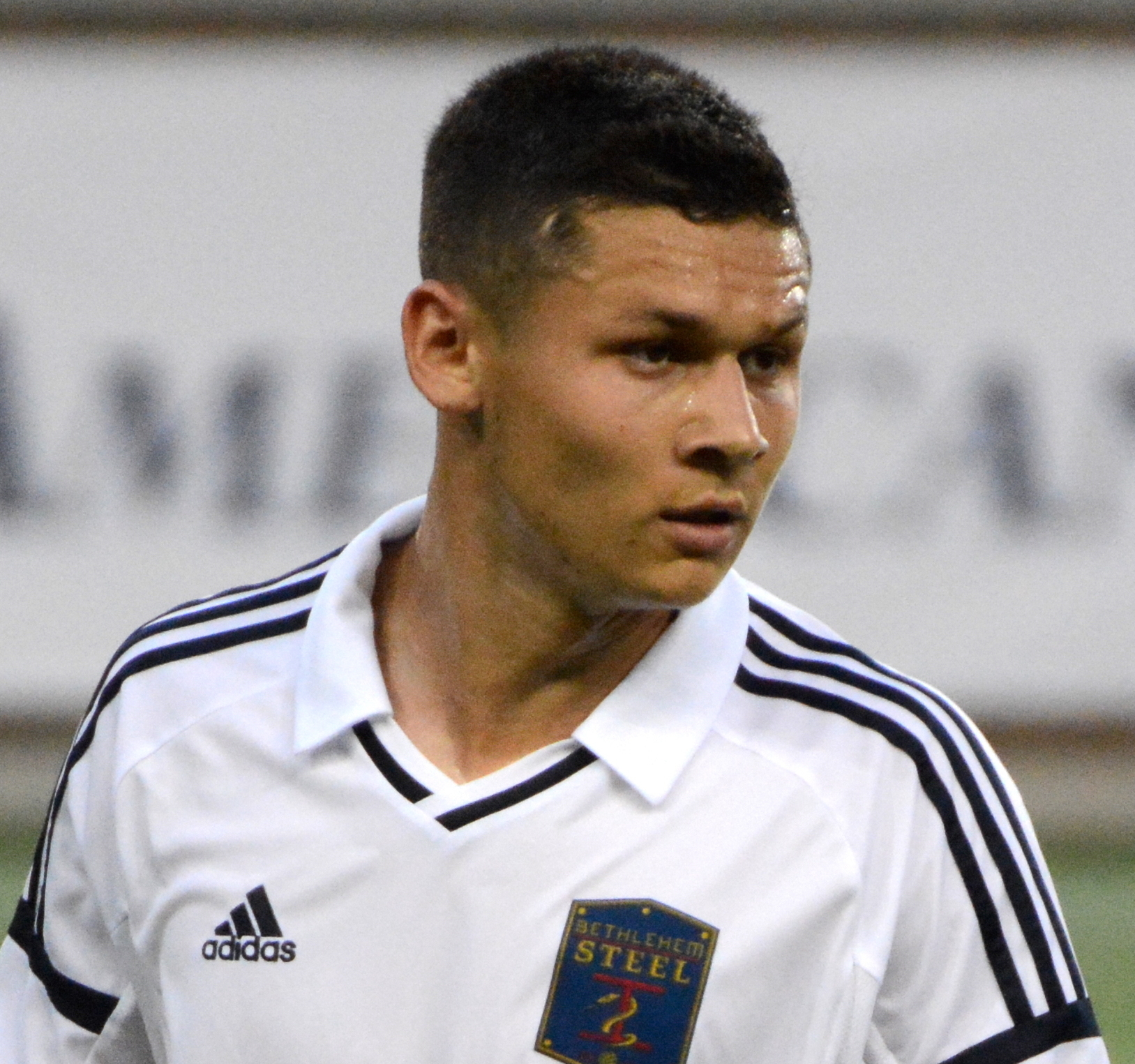
- Mahoney playing for Bethlehem Steel FC in 2017

Personal information
- Full name: Matthew Mahoney
- Date of birth: April 17, 1995 (age 31)
- Place of birth: Buffalo, New York, United States
- Height: 5 ft 11 in (1.80 m)
- Position: Defender

Team information
- Current team: Colorado Springs Switchbacks
- Number: 5

Youth career
- 2008–2011: New York Red Bulls

College career
Years	Team	Apps	(Gls)
2013–2016	Temple Owls	78	(5)

Senior career*
Years	Team	Apps	(Gls)
2014–2016	Jersey Express	36	(1)
2017–2018	Bethlehem Steel	42	(2)
2019–2020	Sacramento Republic	32	(2)
2021–	Colorado Springs Switchbacks	175	(8)
- * Club domestic league appearances and goals as of November 7, 2026

Matthew Mahoney (born April 17, 1995) is an American professional soccer player who currently plays in the USL Championship for Colorado Springs Switchbacks.

== Career ==
=== Youth and college ===
Mahoney attended Roy C. Ketcham High School in Wappingers Falls, New York. Mahoney played four years of college soccer at Temple University between 2013 and 2016, where he made 78 appearances, scoring five goals and tallying three assists.

Mahoney also played with Premier Development League side Jersey Express during his time at college.

=== Professional ===
Mahoney signed with United Soccer League side Bethlehem Steel on March 3, 2017. He made his professional debut on May 13, 2017, as a late substitute during a 1–0 win over Toronto FC II.
