= Hadji Barry =

Guinean footballer

Personal information
- Full name: Hadji Ibrahim Barry
- Date of birth: 8 December 1992 (age 33)
- Place of birth: Conakry, Guinea
- Height: 6 ft 2 in (1.88 m)
- Positions: Forward; winger

College career
Years	Team	Apps	(Gls)
2012–2013	Monroe Tribunes		
2014–2015	UCF Knights	33	(12)

Senior career*
Years	Team	Apps	(Gls)
2015	Orlando City U23	6	(2)
2016–2017	Orlando City	11	(0)
2016–2017	→ Orlando City B (loan)	29	(14)
2018	Swope Park Rangers	33	(17)
2019	Ironi Kiryat Shmona	14	(3)
2019	Ottawa Fury	14	(6)
2020	North Carolina FC	15	(1)
2021–2022	Colorado Springs Switchbacks	62	(41)
2022–2024	Future	17	(2)
2025	Hartford Athletic	7	(0)

International career^{‡}
2018	Guinea	2	(0)
- * Club domestic league appearances and goals as of 26 October 2025 ‡ National team caps and goals as of 3 April 2019

Hadji Barry (born 8 December 1992) is a Guinean professional footballer who plays as a forward.

== Career ==
Barry moved from Guinea to the United States in September 2006. He attended Greece Olympia High School in Rochester, New York.

After spending two years at Monroe Community College in 2012 and 2013, Barry later went on to spend two further years in college at the University of Central Florida in 2014 and 2015.

Barry was drafted 13th overall in the 2016 MLS SuperDraft by Orlando City.

He made his professional debut on March 6, 2016, against Real Salt Lake as a 77th-minute substitute.

He was loaned to Orlando City B in March 2016.

Barry signed with USL Championship side Swope Park Rangers on 15 January 2018.

On 18 December 2018, Barry joined Israeli Premier League side Ironi Kiryat Shmona on a 2 1/2-year deal.

Barry rejoined the USL Championship by signing with Ottawa Fury on July 30, 2019.

On 1 January 2020, Barry moved to USL Championship side North Carolina FC.

On 26 January 2021, Barry again moved to a USL Championship side, joining Colorado Springs Switchbacks. Barry won the 2021 USL Championship Golden Boot by matching the league single-season scoring record with 25 goals.

On 3 October 2022, it was announced Barry had joined Egyptian Premier League side Future FC, for a transfer fee described as the largest received in USL Championship history.

Barry returned to the United States on 3 September 2025, joining USL Championship side Hartford Athletic.

== International career ==
Barry made his debut for the Guinea national football team in a 1–1 2019 Africa Cup of Nations qualification tie with Ivory Coast on 18 November 2018.

== Personal ==
Barry became a U.S. Citizen on October 25, 2018

After his father died in 2020, Barry honored him with the name "Baba" on his jersey for the remainder of the season.

== Honours ==
Individual

- USL Championship MVP: 2021
- USL Championship Golden Boot: 2021
- USL Championship All-League First-team: 2021
- USL Championship All-League Second-team (2): 2018, 2022
