= Steven Echevarria =

Puerto Rican footballer (born 1996)

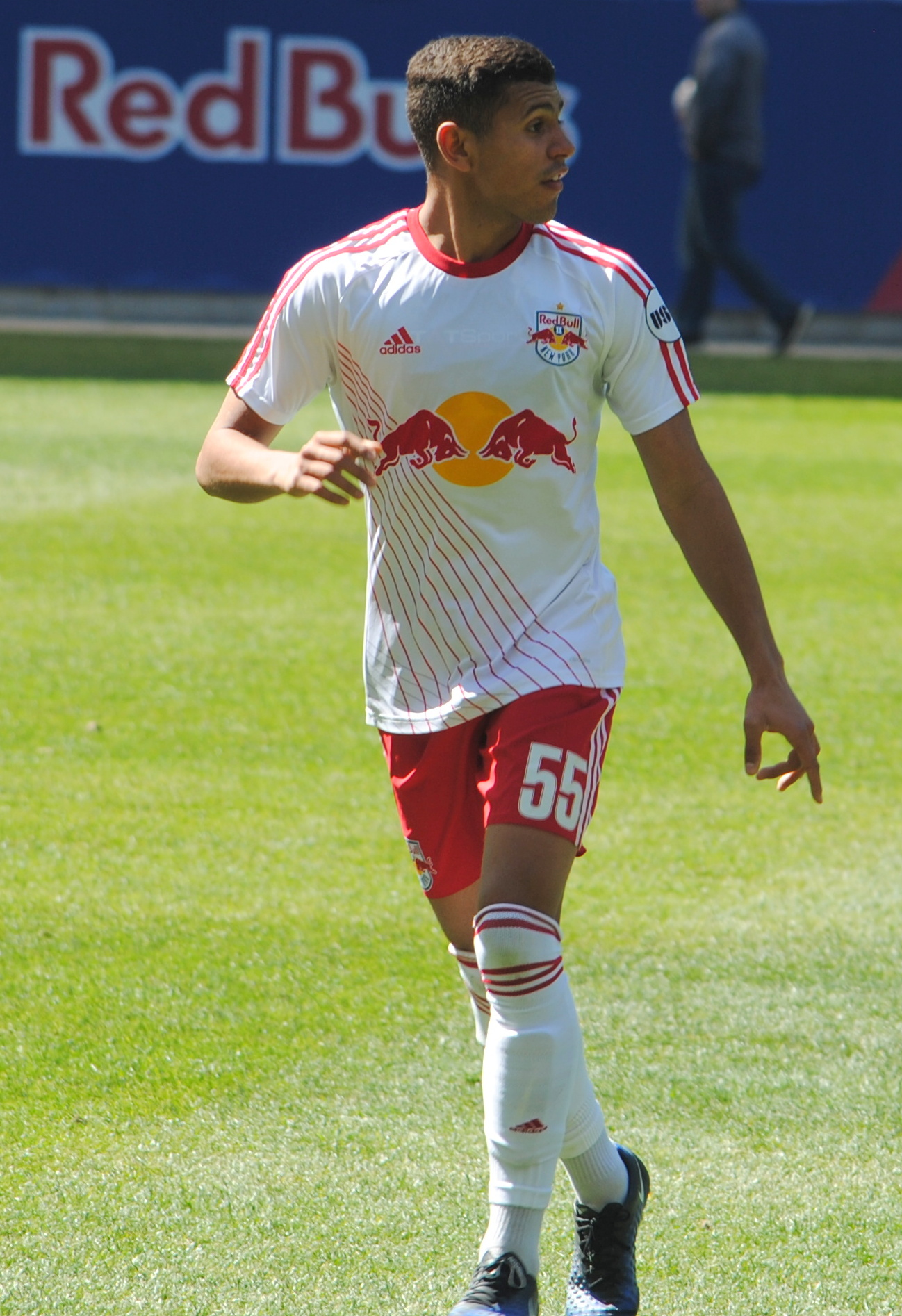

Personal information
- Date of birth: April 9, 1996 (age 30)
- Place of birth: Slate Hill, New York, U.S.
- Height: 1.75 m (5 ft 9 in)
- Position: Midfielder

Team information
- Current team: Colorado Springs Switchbacks
- Number: 13

Youth career
- 2011–2013: New York Red Bulls

College career
Years	Team	Apps	(Gls)
2014–2017	Wake Forest Demon Deacons	79	(7)

Senior career*
Years	Team	Apps	(Gls)
2016–2017	New York Red Bulls U-23	11	(0)
2018	New York Red Bulls II	18	(0)
2021–	Colorado Springs Switchbacks	136	(3)

International career^{‡}
2024–	Puerto Rico	10	(1)
Medal record
Representing Puerto Rico
Men's football
FIFA Series
Winner	2026 Puerto Rico
- * Club domestic league appearances and goals as of November 7, 2026 ‡ National team caps and goals as of September 6, 2024

Steven Echevarria (born April 9, 1996) is a professional footballer who plays as a midfielder for USL Championship club Colorado Springs Switchbacks. Born in the United States, he plays for the Puerto Rico national team.

== Club career ==
=== Youth ===
Born in Slate Hill, New York, Echevarria joined the New York Red Bulls Academy in 2011. He attended college at Wake Forest University and played on the Demon Deacons soccer team for four seasons, making 79 appearances, scoring 7 goals and tallying 6 assists. In 2017, Echevarria was named team captain.

While in college, Echevarria appeared for Premier Development League side New York Red Bulls U-23.

=== New York Red Bulls II ===
On February 14, 2018, Echevarria signed his first professional contract with United Soccer League side New York Red Bulls II. He made his professional debut on March 17, 2018, appearing as a starter for New York in a 2–1 win over Toronto FC II.

=== Colorado Springs Switchbacks ===
On November 16, 2020, Echevarria joined USL Championship side Colorado Springs Switchbacks ahead of their 2021 season.

== Career statistics ==
As of October 28, 2018

Club	Season	League		League Cup		US Open Cup		Continental		Total	
Club	Season	Apps	Goals	Apps	Goals	Apps	Goals	Apps	Goals	Apps	Goals
New York Red Bulls U-23	2016	10	0	0	0	0	0	0	0	10	0
New York Red Bulls U-23	2017	1	0	0	0	0	0	0	0	1	0
New York Red Bulls II	2018	18	0	1	0	0	0	0	0	19	0
Career total		29	0	1	0	0	0	0	0	30	0

=== International ===
As of match played March 28, 2026

Appearances and goals by national team and year
National team	Year	Apps	Goals
Puerto Rico	2024	6	0
Puerto Rico	2025	4	1
Puerto Rico	2026	2	0
Total		10	1

Scores and results list United States goal tally first.

List of international goals scored by Steven Echevarria
No.	Date	Venue	Cap	Opponent	Score	Result	Competition
1	November 18, 2025	Mayagüez Athletics Stadium, Mayagüez, Puerto Rico	8	Saint Vincent and the Grenadines	2–1	2–1	2026 FIFA World Cup qualification

== Honours ==
Puerto Rico

- FIFA Series: 2026
