= 2023 New Mexico United season =

New Mexico United
2023 season
- CEO: Peter Trevisani
- Head coach: Eric Quill
- Stadium: Rio Grande Credit Union Field at Isotopes Park; Albuquerque, New Mexico
- USL: Western Conference: 8th
- USL Cup Playoffs: Conference Quarter-Finals
- U.S. Open Cup: Round of 32
Home colors	Away colors

The 2023 New Mexico United season was the fifth season for New Mexico United in the USL Championship, the second-tier professional soccer league in the United States.

== Roster ==
As of October 22, 2023

Note: Flags indicate national team as defined under FIFA eligibility rules. Players may hold more than one non-FIFA nationality.

No.	Pos.	Nation	Player
1	GK	GRE	Alexandros Tabakis
2	DF	USA	Milo Garvanian
3	DF	USA	Austin Yearwood
4	MF	USA	Sam Hamilton
5	DF	USA	Josh Suggs
6	DF	USA	Arturo Astorga
7	MF	MEX	Sergio Rivas
8	MF	USA	Nicky Hernandez
10	FW	SLV	Amando Moreno
11	FW	ESP	Santi Moar
12	GK	USA	Ford Parker
14	MF	USA	Chris Wehan
16	DF	USA	Will Seymore
17	FW	SCO	Greg Hurst
18	DF	USA	Kyle Colonna
19	DF	USA	Zico Bailey
20	MF	USA	Jacobo Reyes (on loan from Monterrey)
22	DF	USA	Kalen Ryden
25	MF	ENG	Daniel Bruce
26	GK	RUS	Andrew Thomas (on loan from Seattle Sounders FC)
33	DF	USA	Harry Swartz
36	MF	USA	Andres Robles
38	MF	POL	Michael Wyparlo
43	MF	USA	Justin Portillo
45	FW	USA	Cristian Nava
49	FW	HAI	Shanyder Borgelin (on loan from Inter Miami CF)
61	MF	USA	Miles Marritt
72	FW	USA	Alex Waggoner
90	FW	COL	Isaac Zuleta

USL Academy Contract

== Competitions ==
=== USL Championship ===
==== Standings ====
Pos	Team	Pld	W	L	T	GF	GA	GD	Pts	Qualification
6	Phoenix Rising FC (C)	34	12	10	12	54	41	+13	48	Playoffs
7	El Paso Locomotive FC	34	13	13	8	41	51	−10	47	Playoffs
8	New Mexico United	34	13	14	7	51	49	+2	46	Playoffs
9	Rio Grande Valley FC Toros	34	10	11	13	43	48	−5	43	
10	Oakland Roots SC	34	11	14	9	45	48	−3	42	

Source: USL Championship Standings
Rules for classification: 1) head-to-head points; 2) head-to-head goal differential; 3) points-per game within conference; 4) total wins; 5) total goal differential; 6) total goals scored; 7) points earned against top four Conference finishers; 8) disciplinary points; 9) coin toss or drawing of lots
(C) Champions

==== Match results ====
On January 9, 2023, the USL Championship released the regular season schedule for all teams.

All times are in Mountain Standard Time.

===== March =====
March 18 1	Miami FC	0–1	New Mexico United	Miami, Florida
5:00 PM		Report	Portillo 85' (pen.)	Stadium: FIU Stadium; Attendance: 1,445; Referee: Thomas Snyder

===== April =====
April 1 2	Oakland Roots SC	1–0	New Mexico United	Hayward, California
8:00 PM	Rodriguez 63'	Report	Portillo (yellow card) 51' (yellow-red card) 71'	Stadium: Pioneer Stadium; Attendance: 4,695; Referee: Elijio Arreguin

April 8 3	Monterey Bay FC	4–2	New Mexico United	Seaside, California
8:00 PM	Dixon 33'; Gleadle 40'; Volesky 50', 71'	Report	Wehan 12'; Moreno 76'	Stadium: Cardinale Stadium; Attendance: 3,548; Referee: Brandon Stevis

April 15 4	New Mexico United	1–1	San Diego Loyal SC	Albuquerque, New Mexico
7:00 PM	Hamilton 9'	Report	Conway 45+1'	Stadium: Isotopes Park; Attendance: 11,233; Referee: Eric Tattersall

April 22 5	Colorado Springs Switchbacks FC	2–1	New Mexico United	Colorado Springs, Colorado
7:00 PM	Swartz 67' (o.g.); Skundrich 70'	Report	Moar 46'	Stadium: Weidner Field; Attendance: 7,820; Referee: Joshua Encarnación

April 29 6	New Mexico United	3–1	Orange County SC	Albuquerque, New Mexico
7:00 PM	Hurst 22', 63'; Rivas 74'	Report	Suggs 58' (o.g.)	Stadium: Isotopes Park; Attendance: 10,048; Referee: Sergii Boiko

===== May =====
May 5 7	Rio Grande Valley FC Toros	2–2	New Mexico United	Edinburg, Texas
6:00 PM	Franco 7'; Cabrera 73'	Report	Swartz 90+1'; Rivas 90+2'	Stadium: H-E-B Park; Attendance: 5,979; Referee: Greg Dopka

May 13 8	New Mexico United	2–1	Monterey Bay FC	Albuquerque, New Mexico
7:00 PM	Waggoner 22'; Hamilton (yellow card) 53' (yellow-red card) 56'; Rivas 59'	Report	Rebollar 80'	Stadium: Isotopes Park; Attendance: 9,874; Referee: Sergii Demianchuk

May 17 9	Loudoun United FC	1–3	New Mexico United	Leesburg, Virginia
5:00 PM	Williamson 87' (pen.)	Report	Moreno 37'; Wehan 51'; Rivas 64'; Ryden (red card) 85'	Stadium: Segra Field; Attendance: 1,527

May 27 10	San Antonio FC	1–3	New Mexico United	San Antonio, Texas
6:30 PM	Zouhir 20'; Garcia 43'	Report	Colonna 57'	Stadium: Toyota Field; Attendance: 8,027; Referee: Olvin Oliva

===== June =====
June 3 11	New Mexico United	0–1	El Paso Locomotive FC	Albuquerque, New Mexico
7:00 PM		Report	Kostyshyn 71'	Stadium: Isotopes Park; Attendance: 11,247; Referee: Matthew Corrigan

June 10 12	Tampa Bay Rowdies	3–2	New Mexico United	St. Petersburg, Florida
6:30 PM	Spaulding 18', 70'; Dennis 55'	Report	Ryden 45+1'; Swartz 77'	Stadium: Al Lang Stadium; Attendance: 6,245; Referee: Adam Kilpatrick

June 17 13	New Mexico United	2–2	Rio Grande Valley FC Toros	Albuquerque, New Mexico
7:00 PM	Portillo 38'; Bruce 43'	Report	Cabrera 28'; Pinzón 86'	Stadium: Isotopes Park; Attendance: 10,057; Referee: Ekaterina Koroleva

June 21 14	New Mexico United	1–3	Phoenix Rising FC	Albuquerque, New Mexico
7:00 PM	Moreno 51'	Report	Trejo 31'; Armenakas 53'; Arteaga 88'	Stadium: Isotopes Park; Attendance: 7,864; Referee: Ricardo Fierro

June 24 15	New Mexico United	2–1	Colorado Springs Switchbacks FC	Albuquerque, New Mexico
7:00 PM	Moreno 33'; Bruce 48'	Report	Ryden 71' (o.g.)	Stadium: Isotopes Park; Attendance: 9,786; Referee: Alexis Da Silva

===== July =====
July 1 16	El Paso Locomotive FC	0–1	New Mexico United	El Paso, Texas
7:30 PM		Report	Moar 89'	Stadium: Southwest University Park; Attendance: 8,411; Referee: Elton García

July 4 17	Las Vegas Lights FC	2–2	New Mexico United	Las Vegas, Nevada
7:00 PM	Botello Faz 44'; Gonzalez 90+4'	Report	Moreno 13'; Bruce 45+1'	Stadium: Cashman Field; Attendance: 1,644; Referee: Gerald Flores

July 8 18	New Mexico United	1–0	Detroit City FC	Albuquerque, New Mexico
7:00 PM	Waggoner 82'	Report		Stadium: Isotopes Park; Attendance: 9,495; Referee: Elvis Osmanovic

July 22 19	New Mexico United	3–0	Sacramento Republic FC	Albuquerque, New Mexico
7:00 PM	Swartz 45'; Moreno 57'; Hernandez 60'	Report		Stadium: Isotopes Park; Attendance: 10,813; Referee: Natalie Simon

July 29 20	Orange County SC	1–0	New Mexico United	Irvine, California
8:00 PM	Iloski 80'	Report	Hamilton (yellow card) 74' (yellow-red card) 90+7'	Stadium: Championship Soccer Stadium; Attendance: 5,500; Referee: Gabriele Giusti

===== August =====
August 5 21	Hartford Athletic	2–1	New Mexico United	Hartford, Connecticut
5:00 PM	Makangila 69'; Hoppenot 72'; Lewis (yellow card) 86' (yellow-red card) 90'	Report	Hernandez 13'	Stadium: Trinity Health Stadium; Attendance: 5,500; Referee: Danielle Chesky

August 12 22	New Mexico United	0–3	San Antonio FC	Albuquerque, New Mexico
7:00 PM		Report	Zouhir 2', 29'; Patino 40'	Stadium: Isotopes Park; Attendance: 9,740; Referee: Matthew Corrigan

August 19 23	San Diego Loyal SC	2–2	New Mexico United	San Diego, California
7:30 PM	Perez 4'; Moshobane 55'	Report	Colonna 9'; Moreno 90+1'	Stadium: Torero Stadium; Attendance: 4,982; Referee: Abdou Ndiaye

August 23 24	New Mexico United	1–2	Oakland Roots SC	Albuquerque, New Mexico
7:00 PM	Rivas 90+2'	Report	Peláez 42'; Reid 52'	Stadium: Isotopes Park; Attendance: 7,081; Referee: Joshua Encarnación

August 26 25	New Mexico United	2–1	FC Tulsa	Albuquerque, New Mexico
7:00 PM	Swartz 2'; Rivas 45+2'	Report	Epps 78'	Stadium: Isotopes Park; Attendance: 10,130; Referee: Gerald Flores

August 30 26	New Mexico United	3–3	Las Vegas Lights FC	Albuquerque, New Mexico
7:00 PM	Moreno 34', 76'; Seymore 89'	Report	Lage 36'; Bagley 51'; Ríos 53'	Stadium: Isotopes Park; Attendance: 6,102; Referee: Austin Saini

===== September =====
September 2 27	New Mexico United	0–1	Charleston Battery	Albuquerque, New Mexico
7:00 PM		Report	Williams 74'	Stadium: Isotopes Park; Attendance: 9,034; Referee: Alejo Calume

September 10 28	Birmingham Legion FC	1–0	New Mexico United	Birmingham, Alabama
1:30 PM	Brett 73'	Report		Stadium: Protective Stadium; Attendance: 4,518; Referee: Jeremy Scheer

September 15 29	New Mexico United	3–2	Indy Eleven	Albuquerque, New Mexico
7:00 PM	Rivas 44'; Hernandez 64'; Portillo 86' (pen.)	Report	Guenzatti 9'; Vázquez 90+4'	Stadium: Isotopes Park; Attendance: 8,527; Referee: Brad Jensen

September 10 30	Sacramento Republic FC	0–0	New Mexico United	Sacramento, California
8:00 PM		Report		Stadium: Heart Health Park; Attendance: 9,134; Referee: Alexis Da Silva

September 23 31	Pittsburgh Riverhounds SC	2–1	New Mexico United	Pittsburgh, Pennsylvania
6:00 PM	Farrell 27'; Ordoñez 37'	Report	Portillo 83' (pen.)	Stadium: Highmark Stadium; Attendance: 5,610; Referee: Elvis Osmanovic

September 30 32	New Mexico United	2–0	Louisville City FC	Albuquerque, New Mexico
7:00 PM	Borgelin (yellow card) 15' (yellow-red card) 32'; Swartz 32'; Hernandez 74', (yellow card) 70' (yellow-red card) 75'	Report		Stadium: Isotopes Park; Attendance: 11,102; Referee: Corbyn May

===== October =====
October 7 33	Phoenix Rising FC	1–2	New Mexico United	Phoenix, Arizona
8:30 PM	Formella 89'	Report	Moreno 52'; Portillo 83' (pen.)	Stadium: Phoenix Rising Soccer Stadium; Attendance: 4,530; Referee: Elijio Arreguin

October 13 34	New Mexico United	4–1	Memphis 901 FC	Albuquerque, New Mexico
7:00 PM	Swartz 4'; Bailey 13'; Hurst 61', 71'	Report	Vom Steeg 51'	Stadium: Isotopes Park; Attendance: 11,102; Referee: Corbyn May

==== USL Cup Playoffs ====
October 21, 2023 West Quarterfinals	Sacramento Republic FC	1–0	New Mexico United	Sacramento, California
7:00 PM PDT	Donovan 13'; López (yellow card) 62'; Archimede (yellow card) 80'	Report		Stadium: Heart Health Park; Attendance: 11,569; Referee: Ricardo Fierro

=== U.S. Open Cup ===
As a member of the USL Championship, New Mexico United entered the U.S. Open Cup in the second round. After breezing by UDA Soccer 6–0, United was matched up against fellow USL Championship club Phoenix Rising FC, in a match which they won 2–1. In the Round of 32 draw, they were matched up against top-flight MLS side Austin FC away from home, ultimately bowing out of the tournament in a 2–0 defeat.

April 4 Second Round	New Mexico United (USLC)	6–0	(New Mexico) UDA Soccer (LQ)	Rio Rancho, New Mexico
7:00 PM MDT	Sosa 2'; Portillo 40' (pen.); Dolling 48', 61' (pen.), 73'; Bruce 54'	Report		Stadium: Rio Rancho High School; Attendance: 1,680; Referee: Matt Geringer

April 26 Third Round	New Mexico United (USLC)	2–1	(Arizona) Phoenix Rising FC (USLC)	Albuquerque, New Mexico
7:00 PM MDT	Hurst 42'; Dolling 87'	Report	Harvey 77'	Stadium: Isotopes Park; Attendance: 4,126; Referee: William Hale

May 10 Round of 32	Austin FC (MLS) (Texas)	2–0	(New Mexico) New Mexico United (USLC)	Austin, Texas
8:00 PM CDT	Redes 24'; Urruti 36'	Report		Stadium: Q2 Stadium; Attendance: 20,019; Referee: Elton García

=== International Friendly ===
On February 20, 2023, Sunderland A.F.C. announced a tour of the United States as part of their pre-season preparations, including a match against New Mexico United.

19 July 2023 Friendly	New Mexico United (United States)	2–3	Sunderland A.F.C. (England)	Albuquerque, United States
19:00 MST	Garvanian 88'; Zuleta 90+6' (pen.)	Report	Ekwah 39'; Semedo 45+3'; Lihadji 67'	Stadium: Rio Grande Credit Union Field at Isotopes Park
