= 2022 New Mexico United season =

New Mexico United
2022 season
- CEO: Peter Trevisani
- Head coach: Zach Prince
- Stadium: Rio Grande Credit Union Field at Isotopes Park; Albuquerque, New Mexico
- USL: Western Conference: 5th League: 12th
- USL Cup Playoffs: Western Conference Quarterfinals
- U.S. Open Cup: 3rd Round
- Four Corners Cup: Cancelled
- Top goalscorer: Justin Portillo (8)
- Highest home attendance: 14,519 (10/15 v. COS)
- Lowest home attendance: 7,731 (3/30 v. OAK)
- Average home league attendance: 10,269
- Biggest win: NM 7–0 PHX (5/24)
- Biggest defeat: NM 0–3 MIA (8/6)
Home colors	Away colors

The 2022 New Mexico United season was the fourth season for New Mexico United in the USL Championship, the second-tier professional soccer league in the United States.The 2022 USL Championship season was set to begin on March 12, with New Mexico United set to play their first competitive game against Las Vegas Lights FC.

== Off-season and pre-season ==
The club concluded its 2021 season with a 3–1 win over Real Monarchs on October 30. Finishing 5th in the Mountain Division, New Mexico failed to qualify for the USL Championship playoffs. Following the conclusion of the season, Saalih Muhammad's loan spell ended, and he returned to Oakland Roots SC.

Six days later, on November 5 the club announced the departure of inaugural head coach Troy Lesesne after three seasons. His successor, Zach Prince, was announced on November 15, having served as Lesesne's assistant for the past three seasons.

In December, Justin Schmidt and Juan Pablo Guzmán left the club, with the former retiring from playing to join the US Army. December also saw 5 players join the club. Justin Portillo joined from Real Monarchs on December 18, followed by the signing of Haitian youth international Carl Sainté on December 22 from Haitian side Violette AC, and Comorian international Alexis Souahy on December 28 from Louisville City FC. United finished the calendar year by announcing the signings of Tabort Etaka Preston and Neco Brett on December 29 from Hartford Athletic and December 31 from Birmingham Legion FC, respectively.

In January, midfielder Will Seymore joined the club from Finn Harps F.C. On January 8, New Mexico announced the signing of Raddy Ovouka from Ghanaian side Accra Hearts of Oak. Second-choice goalkeeper Philipp Beigl left the club on January 10, moving to El Paso Locomotive. Forward Brian Brown left the club on January 25 in a player transfer with FC Tulsa for Jerome Kiesewetter. Isidro Martinez left the club on January 27, followed the next day by the announcement of the club's 2022 roster, which did not include Will Palmquist, David Najem, Alex Touche, Andrew Tinari, or Devon Sandoval.

== March ==
On March 1, the club announced the signing of goalkeeper and Albuquerque native Ford Parker from Birmingham Legion. New Mexico United began its competitive season on March 13, winning their home and season opener 2-0 over Las Vegas Lights. The team was unbeaten in their 4 competitive matches in March, beating El Paso Locomotive away on March 19 before consecutive home draws to Orange County SC and Oakland Roots on March 26 and 30, respectively.

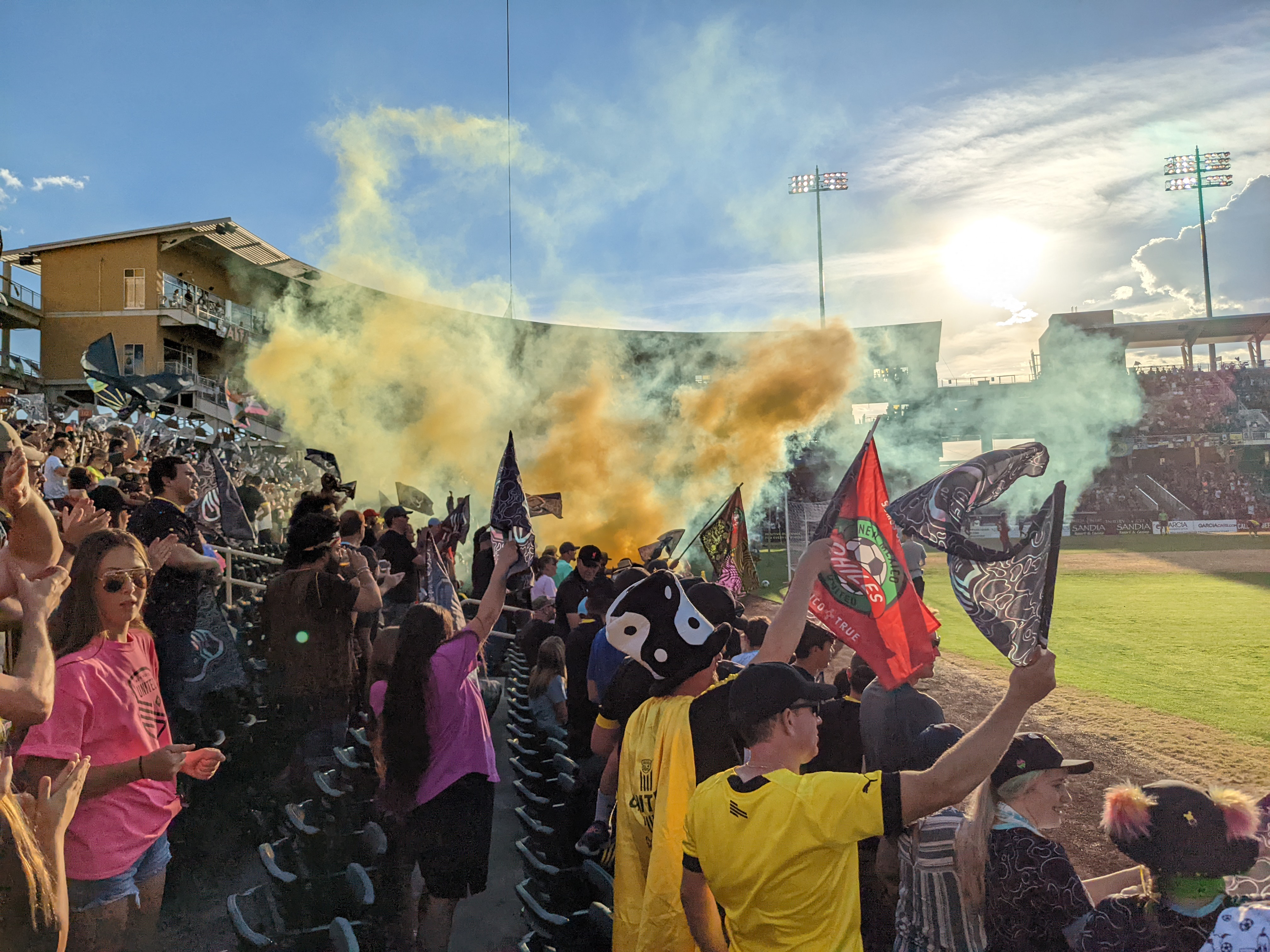
Supporters with flags revel in the celebratory smoke following a goal by New Mexico United in the 1st minute of their match versus Pittsburgh Riverhounds SC on 16 July 2022

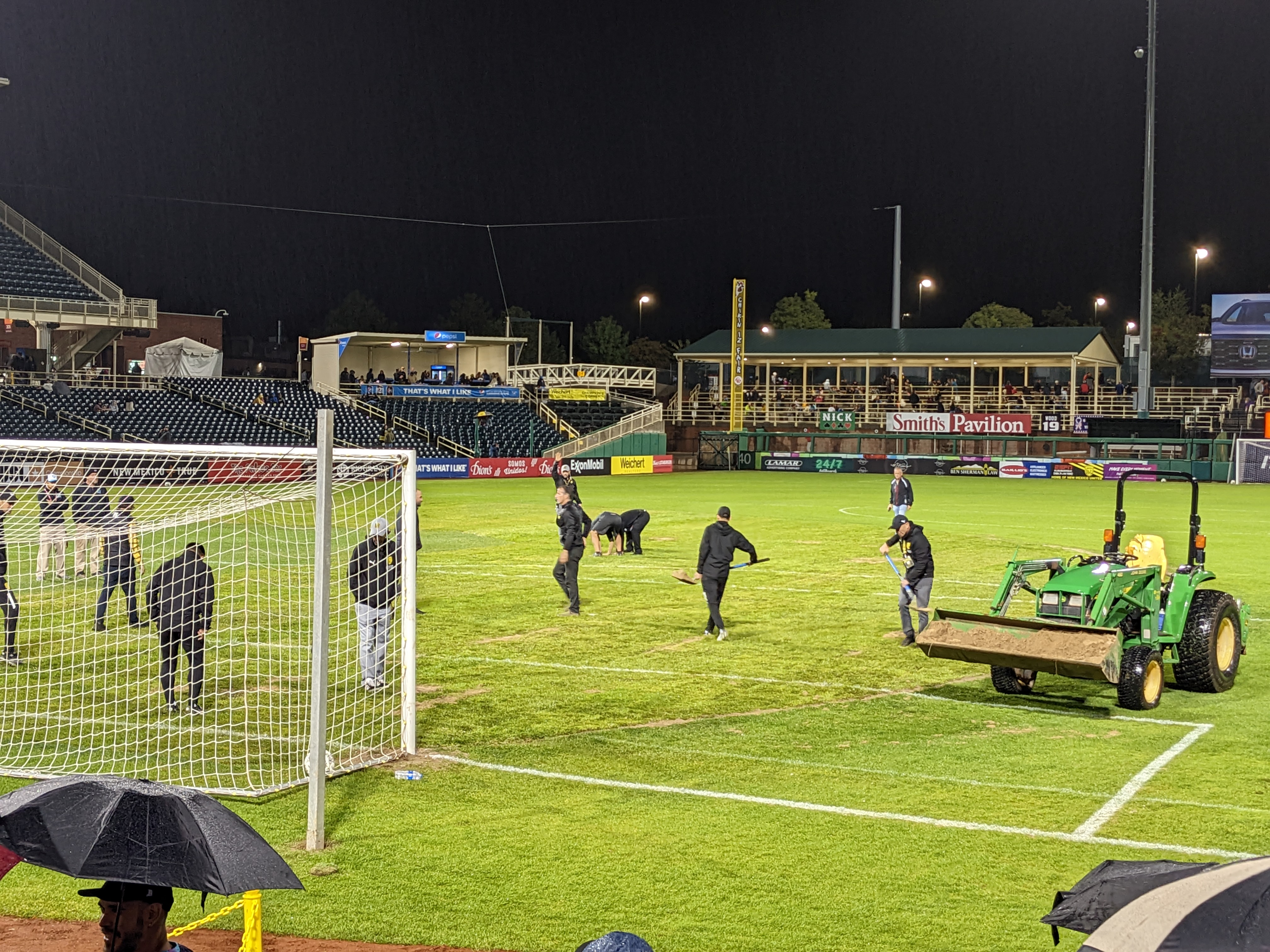
The grounds crew works to repair the sod infield during a weather delay due to poor field conditions at Isotopes Park for the New Mexico United vs. LA Galaxy II match on 5 October 2022

== Club roster ==
As of April 23, 2022

Note: Flags indicate national team as has been defined under FIFA eligibility rules. Players may hold more than one non-FIFA nationality.

No.	Name	Nationality	Position(s)	Date of birth (age)	Season signed	Previous club	Apps. (Note: All competitive matches; includes substitute appearances)	Goals (Note: Goals in all competitions)
Goalkeepers
1	Alex Tambakis	(Greece)	GK	December 8, 1992 (age 33)	2021	(United States) North Carolina FC	35	0
12	Ford Parker	(United States)	GK	August 16, 1996 (age 30)	2022	(United States) Birmingham Legion FC	2	0
24	Cody Mizell	(United States)	GK	September 30, 1991 (age 34)	2022 (Note: Also played for the club from 2019-2020)	(United States) New York City FC	58	0
Defenders
3	Austin Yearwood	(United States)	LB	August 12, 1994 (age 32)	2019	(United States) Richmond Kickers	73	1
5	Josh Suggs	(United States)	LB/CB	April 24, 1989 (age 37)	2019	(United States) Colorado Springs Switchbacks	76	4
6	Alexis Souahy	(Comoros)	CB	January 13, 1995 (age 31)	2022	(United States) Louisville City FC	6	0
15	Rashid Tetteh	(Ghana)	CB	July 14, 1995 (age 31)	2019	(United States) High Point Panthers	69	0
22	Kalen Ryden	(United States)	CB/LB	January 29, 1991 (age 35)	2020	(United States) Real Monarchs	47	2
26	Raddy Ovouka	(Republic of the Congo)	LB	December 7, 1999 (age 26)	2022	(Ghana) Accra Hearts of Oak S.C. (on loan)	4	1
Midfielders
4	Sam Hamilton	(United States)	DM/CB	July 26, 1995 (age 31)	2019	(United States) Colorado Rapids	57	2
11	Sergio Rivas	(Mexico)	AM	October 3, 1997 (age 28)	2021	(United States) Reno 1868	35	6
16	Will Seymore	(United States)	CM	February 29, 1992 (age 34)	2022	(Republic of Ireland) Finn Harps F.C.	7	0
18	Carl Sainté	(Haiti)	CM	August 9, 2002 (age 24)	2022	(Haiti) Violette AC	4	1
23	Micheal Azira	(Uganda)	CM/DM	August 22, 1987 (age 39)	2021	(United States) Chicago Fire FC	32	1
25	Daniel Bruce	(England)	RW/RM	May 13, 1996 (age 30)	2019	(United States) UNC Charlotte 49ers	76	5
33	Harry Swartz	(United States)	RB/RM	March 19, 1996 (age 30)	2021	(United States) Hartford Athletic	19	2
43	Justin Portillo	(United States)	CM/DM	September 9, 1992 (age 34)	2022	(United States) Real Monarchs	8	0
Forwards
7	Neco Brett	(Jamaica)	CF	March 22, 1992 (age 34)	2022	(United States) Birmingham Legion FC	7	4
9	Devon Sandoval	(United States)	CF	June 16, 1991 (age 35)	2019	(United States) Atlanta United 2	82	25
10	Amando Moreno	(El Salvador)	LW/RW/AM	September 10, 1995 (age 31)	2020	(United States) Chicago Fire	36	11
14	Ilija Ilić	(Serbia)	CF	April 26, 1991 (age 35)	2021	(United States) Indy Eleven	25	3
17	Jerome Kiesewetter	(United States)	CF	February 9, 1993 (age 33)	2022	(United States) FC Tulsa	4	2
19	Tabort Etaka Preston	(Cameroon)	LW	June 10, 1998 (age 28)	2022	(United States) Hartford Athletic	8	1
41	Chris Wehan	(United States)	AM/CM/LM	January 29, 1994 (age 32)	2021	(United States) Orange County SC	74	29
45	Cristian Nava	(United States)	CF	September 2, 2003 (age 23)	2021	—	8	0

=== Transfers out ===
Pos.	No.	Player	To club	Exit date	Ref.
CB	17	(United States) Justin Schmidt	Retired	December 7, 2021	
DM/CM	8	(Colombia) Juan Pablo Guzmán	Free agent	December 10, 2021	
GK	27	(Germany) Philipp Beigl	(United States) El Paso Locomotive FC (Note: Free transfer)	January 10, 2022	
CF	99	(Jamaica) Brian Brown	(United States) FC Tulsa	January 25, 2022	
DM/CM	7	(United States) Isidro Martinez	Released (Note: Later signed with RGV Toros)	January 27, 2022	
GK	12	(United States) Will Palmquist	Free agent (Note: Player did not appear in the club's 2022 roster.)	January 28, 2022	
RB/RM/LB	6	(Afghanistan) David Najem	Free agent	January 28, 2022	
CB	16	(England) Alex Touche	Free agent (Note: Player later signed with Union Omaha)	January 28, 2022	
CM	20	(United States) Andrew Tinari	Free agent	January 28, 2022	
CF	9	(United States) Devon Sandoval	Free agent	January 28, 2022	
CF	14	(Serbia) Ilija Ilić	released	July 18, 2022	

=== Transfers in ===
Pos.	Player	From club	Date	Ref.
CM/DM	(United States) Justin Portillo	(United States) Real Monarchs (Note: Free transfer)	December 18, 2021	
CM	(Haiti) Carl Sainté	(Haiti) Violette AC	December 22, 2021	
CB	(Comoros) Alexis Souahy	(United States) Louisville City FC	December 28, 2021	
LW	(Cameroon) Tabort Etaka Preston	(United States) Hartford Athletic	December 29, 2021	
CF	(Jamaica) Neco Brett	(United States) Birmingham Legion FC	December 31, 2021	
CM	(United States) Will Seymore	(Republic of Ireland) Finn Harps F.C.	January 2, 2022	
CF	(United States) Jerome Kiesewetter	(United States) FC Tulsa	January 25, 2022	
GK	(United States) Ford Parker	(United States) Birmingham Legion FC	March 1, 2022	
CF	(United States) Devon Sandoval	Free Agent	May 19, 2022	
CF	(Jamaica) Romario Williams	(Kuwait) Al-Qadsia	July 14, 2022	
FWD	(Jamaica) Kevaughn Frater	(Israel) Hapoel Nof HaGalil F.C.	August 8, 2022	

==== Loans in ====
Pos.	Player	From club	Date	Until	Ref.
LB	(Republic of the Congo) Raddy Ovouka	(Ghana) Accra Hearts of Oak S.C.	January 8, 2022	End of season	
GK	(United States) Cody Mizell	(United States) New York City FC	April 15, 2022	April 24, 2022 (Note: Player was loaned in for a indeterminate amount of time as an emergency goalkeeper loan)	

== Competitions ==
=== Friendlies ===
In January, New Mexico United announced a series of three pre-season friendly matches in San Diego in February against San Diego Loyal SC, Vancouver Whitecaps FC, Orange County SC. Followed by a friendly in El Paso against El Paso Locomotive, before finishing up the pre-season schedule at home versus USL League 1 expansion side Northern Colorado Hailstorm FC at United's home training facility.

==== Results ====
February 5 Preseason	San Diego Loyal SC	1–1	New Mexico United	Chula Vista, California
2:00 pm PST (UTC-8:00)	Unknown 69' (pen.)	Report	Bruce 34'	Stadium: Chula Vista Elite Athlete Training Center; Attendance: closed door

February 9 Preseason	New Mexico United	0–0	Vancouver Whitecaps FC	Chula Vista, California
1:00 pm PST (UTC-8:00)		Report		Stadium: Chula Vista Elite Athlete Training Center; Attendance: closed door

February 12 Preseason	New Mexico United	0–2	Orange County SC	Chula Vista, California
11:00 am PST (UTC-8:00)				Stadium: Chula Vista Elite Athlete Training Center; Attendance: closed door

February 26 Preseason	El Paso Locomotive FC	1–3	New Mexico United	El Paso, Texas
2:00pm MST (UTC-7:00)	Zacarias 57'	Report	Swartz 55'; Siante 76'; Nava 78'	Stadium: Westside Sports Complex; Attendance: closed door

March 5 Preseason	New Mexico United	2–2	Hailstorm FC	Albuquerque, New Mexico
12:00 pm MST (UTC-7:00)		Report		Stadium: Mesa del Sol Training Facility

=== USL Championship ===
On December 21, the USL announced the competition format for the 2022 season. New Mexico United was placed into a 13-team Western Conference, and will play 34 games in the regular season; a double round robin against conference opponents with an additional 10 games against various opponents from around the league. New Mexico United and the USL announced the full schedule on January 13.

==== Conference table ====
Pos	Team	Pld	W	L	T	GF	GA	GD	Pts	Qualification
1	San Antonio FC (C, X)	34	24	5	5	54	26	+28	77	Qualification for the Conference Semifinals
2	San Diego Loyal SC	34	18	10	6	68	55	+13	60	Playoffs
3	Colorado Springs Switchbacks	34	17	13	4	59	53	+6	55	Playoffs
4	Sacramento Republic	34	15	11	8	48	34	+14	53	Playoffs
5	New Mexico United	34	13	9	12	49	40	+9	51	Playoffs
6	Rio Grande Valley Toros	34	14	13	7	51	40	+11	49	Playoffs
7	Oakland Roots SC	34	11	10	13	51	46	+5	46	Playoffs
8	El Paso Locomotive FC	34	13	14	7	56	52	+4	46	
9	Las Vegas Lights FC	34	12	13	9	40	50	−10	45	
10	Phoenix Rising FC	34	12	16	6	50	58	−8	42	
11	LA Galaxy II	34	11	16	7	53	63	−10	40	
12	Monterey Bay FC	34	12	18	4	42	59	−17	40	
13	Orange County SC	34	7	14	13	49	59	−10	34	

Source: USL Championship Standings
Rules for classification: 1) head-to-head points; 2) head-to-head goal differential; 3) points-per game within conference; 4) total wins; 5) total goal differential; 6) total goals scored; 7) points earned against top four Conference finishers; 8) disciplinary points; 9) coin toss or drawing of lots
(C) Champions; (X) Regular Season League Champion

==== Results summary ====
Overall								Home						Away					
Pld	W	D	L	GF	GA	GD	Pts	W	D	L	GF	GA	GD	W	D	L	GF	GA	GD
6	2	2	2	7	6	+1	8	1	2	1	5	4	+1	1	0	1	2	2	0

Last updated: January 11, 2021.

==== Results by matchday ====
Position in the Western Conference
Round	1	2	3	4	5	6	7	8	9	10	11	12	13	14	15	16	17	18	19	20	21	22	23	24	25	26	27	28	29	30	31	32	33	34
Stadium	H	A	H	H	A	H	A	H	A	H	A	A	A	H	H	A	H	A	H	A	A	H	H	A	H	H	A	H	A	A	A	H (Note: Game date is not yet confirmed.)	A	H
Result	W	W	D	D	L	L	—	—	—	—	—	—	—	—	—	—	—	—	—	—	—	—	—	—	—	—	—	—	—	—	—	—	—	—
Position	3	1	3	4	7	8	—	—	—	—	—	—	—	—	—	—	—	—	—	—	—	—	—	—	—	—	—	—	—	—	—	—	—	—

A = Away; H = Home; W = Win; D = Draw; L = Loss

==== Matches ====
Win Draw Loss Postponed

March 13 1	New Mexico United	2–0	Las Vegas Lights FC	Albuquerque, New Mexico
5:05 pm MDT (UTC-6:00)	Swartz 37', (yellow card) 44'; Brett 49'; Wehan (yellow card) 53'	Report	Lara (yellow card) 53'; Trejo (yellow card) 59'; Traore (yellow card) 65'	Stadium: Isotopes Park; Attendance: 11,247; Referee: Gerald Flores

March 19 2	El Paso Locomotive FC	1–2	New Mexico United	El Paso, Texas
6:00 pm MDT (UTC-6:00)	Mares 22', (yellow card) 30'; Fox (yellow card) 29'; Brockbank (yellow card) 44'; Zacarías (yellow card) 51'; Hinds (yellow card) 90+4'	Report	Brett 32'; Portillo (yellow card) 44'; Souahy (yellow card) 51'; Preston 66'; Seymore (yellow card) 77'; Wehan (yellow card) 81'	Stadium: Southwest University Park; Attendance: 8,124; Referee: Malik Badawi

March 26 3	New Mexico United	1–1	Orange County SC	Albuquerque, New Mexico
4:00 pm MDT (UTC-6:00)	Seymore (yellow card) 38'; Swartz 78'	Report	Kuningas (yellow card) 50'; Skendi (yellow card) 72'; M. Iloski 90+1', (yellow card) 90+1'	Stadium: Isotopes Park; Attendance: 10,676; Referee: Calin Radosav

March 30 4	New Mexico United	2–2	Oakland Roots SC	Albuquerque, New Mexico
7:00 pm MDT (UTC-6:00)	Seymore (yellow card) 40'; Brett 45+1'; Rivas 69'; Ovouka (yellow card) 90+2'	Report	Dennis 8'; Barbir (yellow card) 70'; Morad 90+1'	Stadium: Isotopes Park; Attendance: 7,731; Referee: Ricardo Fierro

April 16 5	Phoenix Rising FC	1–0	New Mexico United	Chandler, Arizona
8:30 pm MDT (UTC-6:00)	Quinn (yellow card) 13'; Hurst 14', (yellow card) 88'; King (yellow card) 27'; Lambert (yellow card) 41'; Lundt (yellow card) 70'; Flood (yellow card) 90'	Report	Seymore (yellow card) 63'; Preston (yellow card) 63'	Stadium: Phoenix Rising Soccer Complex at Wild Horse Pass; Attendance: 7,011; Referee: Gerald Flores (United States)

April 23 6	New Mexico United	0–1	San Antonio FC	Albuquerque, New Mexico
7:00 pm MDT (UTC-6:00)	Tetteh (yellow card) 43'; Preston (yellow card) 45+2'; Portillo (yellow card) 56'; Bruce (yellow card) 65'; Kiesewetter (yellow card) 89'	Report	Taintor (yellow card) 18'; Dhillon 67' (pen.); Garcia (yellow card) 84'	Stadium: Isotopes Park; Attendance: 11,420; Referee: Michael Radchuk (United States)

May 4 7	Sacramento Republic FC	0–0	New Mexico United	Sacramento, California
8:00 pm MDT (UTC-6:00)	López (penalty missed) 87'	Report	Swartz (yellow card) 49'; Parker (yellow card) 86'	Stadium: Heart Health Park; Attendance: 7,835; Referee: Ricardo Fierro

May 7 8	New Mexico United	1–1	San Diego Loyal SC	Albuquerque, New Mexico
7:00 pm MDT (UTC-6:00)	Brett (yellow card) 43'; Swartz 90+4'; Ovouka (yellow card) 90+5'	Report	Martin (yellow card) 44'; Vassell 45+1', (yellow card) 87'; Martin (yellow card) 46' (yellow-red card) 79'; Adams (yellow card) 53'	Stadium: Isotopes Park; Attendance: 12,079; Referee: Mark Allatin

May 14 9	Charleston Battery	0–2	New Mexico United	Mount Pleasant, South Carolina
5:00 pm MDT (UTC-6:00)	Apodaca (yellow card) 58'; Booth (yellow card) 59'	Report	Brett 5'; Wehan 46'; Swartz (yellow card) 78'; Hamilton (yellow card) 81'; Nava (yellow card) 84'	Stadium: Patriots Point Soccer Complex; Attendance: 2,744; Referee: Adam Kilpatrick

May 24 10	New Mexico United	7–0	Phoenix Rising FC	Albuquerque, New Mexico
7:00 pm MDT (UTC-6:00)	Wehan 6'; Portillo (penalty scored) 10', (penalty scored) 30'; Swartz 18'; Nava (yellow card) 45+2', (goal) 78'; Rivas (yellow card) 52'; King 75' (o.g.); Bruce 82'	Report	Anguiano (yellow card) 61'; Hardy (yellow card) 71'; Madrid (yellow card) 81'	Stadium: UNM Soccer Complex; Attendance: 10,504; Referee: Matthew Corrigan

May 28 11	Indy Eleven	1–2	New Mexico United	Indianapolis, Indiana
2:00 pm MDT (UTC-6:00)	Arteaga (yellow card) 35'; Stéfano Pinho 80'	Report	Portillo 38'; Jérôme 63' (o.g.); Kiesewetter (yellow card) 90+4'	Stadium: IU Michael A. Carroll Track & Soccer Stadium; Attendance: 6,915; Referee: Elvis Osmanovic

June 4 12	Orange County SC	1–2	New Mexico United	Irvine, California
7:00 pm MDT (UTC-6:00)	McCabe (yellow card) 17'; Iloski 90+1'; Torres (penalty missed) 90+6'	Report	Portillo 18' (pen.), (yellow card) 71'; Wehan 32', (yellow card) 49'; Rivas (yellow card) 60'; Seymore (yellow card) 78'; Sandoval (yellow card) 87'	Stadium: Championship Soccer Stadium; Attendance: 5,135; Referee: Mark Allatin

June 15 13	Oakland Roots SC	1–2	New Mexico United	Oakland, California
8:00 pm MDT (UTC-6:00)	Rito 20'	Report	Brett 58'; Wehan 67'; Kiesewetter (red card) 90+2'	Stadium: Laney College Football Stadium; Attendance: 3,752; Referee: Gerald Flores

June 25 14	New Mexico United	0–2	Birmingham Legion FC	Albuquerque, New Mexico
7:00 pm MDT (UTC-6:00)		Report	Agudelo 21'; Martínez 30'	Stadium: Isotopes Park; Attendance: 12,527; Referee: Melvin Rivas

July 2 15	Monterey Bay FC	1–1	New Mexico United	Seaside, California
8:00 pm MDT (UTC-6:00)	Boone 2'; Crawford (yellow card) 64'	Report	Rivas 40'; Seymore (yellow card) 75'; Nava (yellow card) 86'	Stadium: Cardinale Stadium; Attendance: 3,114; Referee: Dejan Susak

July 6 16	New Mexico United	1–0	Rio Grande Valley FC Toros	Albuquerque, New Mexico
7:00 pm MDT (UTC-6:00)	Nava (yellow card) 69'; Suggs (yellow card) 69'; Portillo 84' (pen.)	Report	Portillo (yellow card) 40'; Pimentel (yellow card) 55'; Ycaza (yellow card) 69'; Ruiz (yellow card) 74'; Ricketts (yellow card) 80'; Ackwei (yellow card) 83'	Stadium: Isotopes Park; Referee: Kevin Stott

July 9 17	New Mexico United	1–1	Rio Grande Valley FC Toros	Albuquerque, New Mexico
7:00 pm MDT (UTC-6:00)	Kiesewetter 22', (yellow card) 45+1'; Tetteh (yellow card) 25'; Bruce (yellow card) 45+1'; Souahy (yellow card) 54'; Nava (yellow card) 80'	Report	Pimental (yellow card) 52'; Cabezas (yellow card) 71'; Ricketts (yellow card) 79'; Vázquez 90'	Stadium: Isotopes Park; Attendance: 10,781; Referee: Elijio Arreguin

July 13 18	FC Tulsa	1–2	New Mexico United	Tulsa, Oklahoma
6:30 pm MDT (UTC-6:00)	Brown (yellow card) 64'; Tetteh 70' (o.g.); Fenwick (yellow card) 74' (yellow-red card) 90'; Diz (yellow card) 87'	Report	Ovouka (yellow card) 16'; Souahy 54'; Portillo 76' (pen.); Kiesewetter (yellow card) 89'	Stadium: ONEOK Field; Attendance: 4,607; Referee: Jervis Atagana

July 16 19	New Mexico United	1–1	Pittsburgh Riverhounds SC	Albuquerque, New Mexico
7:00 pm MDT (UTC-6:00)	Kiesewetter 1'; Hamilton (yellow card) 12'; Swartz (yellow card) 62'	Report	Dossantos (yellow card) 57'; Kelly 75'	Stadium: Isotopes Park; Attendance: 12,069; Referee: Greg Dopka

July 23 20	Detroit City FC	2–2	New Mexico United	Hamtramck, Michigan
5:30 pm MDT (UTC-6:00)	Rodriguez 25' (pen.), (yellow card) 56'; Bryant (yellow card) 35'; Wynne 62'; Hoppenot (yellow card) 73'; Diop (yellow card) 78'; Dunwell (yellow card) 82'; Atuahene (yellow card) 85'	Report	Wehan 30'; Ryden (yellow card) 66'; Seymore (yellow card) 80'; Brett 90+2'	Stadium: Keyworth Stadium; Attendance: 7,470; Referee: Malik Badawi

July 31 21	New York Red Bulls II	1–2	New Mexico United	Montclair, New Jersey
4:00 pm MDT (UTC-6:00)	Ndam (yellow card) 24' (yellow-red card) 75'; Ofori (yellow card) 44'; Sserwadda 55', (yellow card) 90+6'; Mullings (yellow card) 65'	Report	Brett 9'; Yearwood (yellow card) 60'; Seymore 90'; Bruce (yellow card) 90+2'; Portillo (penalty missed) 90+5'	Stadium: MSU Soccer Park at Pittser Field; Attendance: 470; Referee: Austin Saini

August 3 22	New Mexico United	1–2	Sacramento Republic FC	Albuquerque, New Mexico
7:00 pm MDT (UTC-6:00)	Preston (yellow card) 12', (goal) 54'; Moreno (yellow card) 90+3'	Report	Keko (yellow card) 3', (goal) 57'; Viader (yellow card) 34'; Martínez 61'; Ross (yellow card) 90+2'	Stadium: Isotopes Park; Attendance: 9,318; Referee: Matthew Corrigan

August 6 23	New Mexico United	0–3	Miami FC	Albuquerque, New Mexico
7:00 pm MDT (UTC-6:00)	Williams (yellow card) 43'; Seymore (yellow card) 45+1'; Suggs (yellow card) 74'; Swartz (yellow card) 90+3'	Report	Murphy 45+3', 49'; Palacios (yellow card) 65'; Parkes 79'; Rivas (yellow card) 90+1'; Walker (yellow card) 90+6'	Stadium: Isotopes Park; Attendance: 11,024; Referee: Brad Jensen

August 14 24	LA Galaxy II	2–2	New Mexico United	Carson, California
6:00 pm MDT (UTC-6:00)	Dunbar 62', (yellow card) 90+4'; Saldana (yellow card) 66'; Perez 69'; Picazo (yellow card) 85'	Report	Suggs (yellow card) 13'; Williams 24'; Lambe 42' (o.g.); Swartz (yellow card) 45+1'; Hamilton (yellow card) 45+2'; Nava (yellow card) 65'	Stadium: Dignity Health Sports Park; Referee: Kevin Broadley

August 17 25	New Mexico United	0–2	Memphis 901 FC	Albuquerque, New Mexico
7:00 pm MDT (UTC-6:00)	Seymore (yellow card) 44'; Frater (yellow card) 56'	Report	Buckmaster (yellow card) 30'; Nascimento 37'; Goodrum 90+2'	Stadium: Isotopes Park; Attendance: 7,414; Referee: José Carlos Rivero

August 20 26	New Mexico United	2–0	Monterey Bay FC	Albuquerque, New Mexico
7:00 pm MDT (UTC-6:00)	Wehan 38'; Preston 39'; Souahy (yellow card) 45+1'; Hamilton (yellow card) 64'	Report	Boone (yellow card) 74'	Stadium: Isotopes Park; Attendance: 7,414; Referee: Eric Tattersall

August 27 27	Colorado Springs Switchbacks FC	1–0	New Mexico United	Colorado Springs, Colorado
7:00 pm MDT (UTC-6:00)	Ockford (yellow card) 25'; Barry 39'; Rayyan (yellow card) 48'	Report	Frater (yellow card) 28'; Preston (yellow card) 89'	Stadium: Weidner Field; Attendance: 8,023; Referee: Greg Dopka

September 2 28	New Mexico United	1–2	El Paso Locomotive FC	Albuquerque, New Mexico
7:00 pm MDT (UTC-6:00)	Frater 22', (yellow card) 32'; Tettah (yellow card) 45'; Ryden (yellow card) 45+4'	Report	Bahner (yellow card) 9'; Solignac 18', 71'; Yuma (yellow card) 87'; Gómez (yellow card) 88'	Stadium: Isotopes Park; Attendance: 10,721; Referee: Ricardo Fierro

September 10 29	Rio Grande Valley FC Toros	3–1	New Mexico United	Edinburg, Texas
6:30 pm MDT (UTC-6:00)	Ycaza 15'; Pinzón 22'; Fjeldberg 68'	Report	Moreno 8'; Portillo (yellow card) 45+1'; Ovouka (yellow card) 73'	Stadium: H-E-B Park; Attendance: 4,668; Referee: Elton García

September 17 30	San Antonio FC	1–1	New Mexico United	San Antonio, Texas
6:30 pm MDT (UTC-6:00)	Bailone 54'; Manley (yellow card) 69'; Adeniran (yellow card) 71'	Report	Portillo (yellow card) 20'; Wehan 66'; Frater (yellow card) 74'; Hamilton (yellow card) 81'; Swartz (yellow card) 85'	Stadium: Toyota Field; Attendance: 6,019; Referee: Brad Jensen

September 30 31	Las Vegas Lights FC	0–0	New Mexico United	Las Vegas, Nevada
8:00 pm MDT (UTC-6:00)	Crisostomo (yellow card) 7'; Traore (yellow card) 34'; Lara (yellow card) 47'; Trejo (yellow card) 53'; Dueñas (yellow card) 65'; Keinan (red card) 89'	Report	Seymore (yellow card) 85'	Stadium: Cashman Field; Referee: Malik Badawi

October 9 32	San Diego Loyal SC	3–3	New Mexico United	San Diego, California
7:30 pm MDT (UTC-6:00)	Adams (penalty scored) 24'; Guido 28'; Ackon (yellow card) 45+4'; Amang 52'; Vassell (yellow card) 79'	Report	Portillo (penalty scored) 2', (yellow card) 4'; Moreno 40', 47'	Stadium: Torero Stadium; Attendance: 5,621; Referee: Kevin Broadley

October 12 33	New Mexico United	3–2	LA Galaxy II	Albuquerque, New Mexico
7:00 pm MDT (UTC-6:00)	Portillo 13' (pen.); Frater (yellow card) 21'; Seymore (yellow card) 44'; Swartz 49', 54'	Report	Ryden 6' (o.g.); Salazar 31', (yellow card) 88'; Saldana (yellow card) 65'; Doyle (yellow card) 90+3'	Stadium: Isotopes Park; Attendance: 10,426; Referee: Adam Kilpatrick

October 15 34	New Mexico United	2–0	Colorado Springs Switchbacks FC	Albuquerque, New Mexico
7:00 pm MDT (UTC-6:00)	Nava 21'; Souahy (yellow card) 32'; Bruce 44'; Rivas (yellow card) 46'; Hamilton (yellow card) 73'	Report	Echevarria (yellow card) 68'; Anderson (yellow card) 79'	Stadium: Isotopes Park; Attendance: 14,519; Referee: Natalie Simon

==== USL Championship playoffs ====
===== Results =====
October 22 WC Quarterfinal	Sacramento Republic FC	2–0	New Mexico United	Sacramento, California
8:00 PM MDT	López (yellow card) 27'; Foster 47'; Keko 74'	Report	Yearwood (yellow card) 16'; Moreno (yellow card) 42'	Stadium: Heart Health Park; Attendance: 11,569; Referee: Elvis Osmanovic

=== U.S. Open Cup ===
New Mexico United will enter the U.S. Open Cup in the Second Round, to be played between April 5 and April 7. The Second Round draw took place on February 11, 2022, where it was announced that United would face the winner of the opening round match between Park City Red Wolves SC and Las Vegas Legends. After defeating the Park City Red Wolves in the first round, Las Vegas Legends were defeated by United in the second. For the third round, New Mexico United were placed into the Mountain regional draw, along with fellow USL Championship member Phoenix Rising, USL League One side Northern Colorado Hailstorm FC, and MLS side Real Salt Lake. Along with Northern Colorado, United declined to host in this round, so they were drawn to determine who would visit Wild Horse Pass, and who would visit Rio Tinto Stadium. As it happened, United were drawn away to Phoenix. This made their third round match their second consecutive match-up with Phoenix.

April 5 Second Round	New Mexico United	5–0	(Nevada) Las Vegas Legends	Albuquerque, New Mexico
7:30 pm MDT (UTC-6:00)	Wehan 7' (pen.); Kiesewetter 17', 86' (pen.), (yellow card) 78'; Ovouka 40'; Sainté 47'	Report	Rangel (yellow card) 57'; Kuwa (yellow card) 65'; Guzman (yellow card) 73' (yellow-red card) 82'; Casillas (yellow card) 86'	Stadium: UNM Soccer Complex; Attendance: 2,128; Referee: Cuauhtemoc Delgadillo

April 20 Third Round	Phoenix Rising (Arizona)	2–1	New Mexico United	Chandler, Arizona
7:30 pm MST (UTC-7:30)	Seymore 6' (o.g.); Madrid (yellow card) 79'; Hurst 81'	Report	Bruce (yellow card) 8'; Brett (yellow card) 37', (goal) 65'	Stadium: Phoenix Rising Soccer Complex at Wild Horse Pass; Referee: Alan Martinez-Loyola (United States); Assistant referees: Melissa Beck (United States); Noah Kenyawani (United States); Fourth official: Hernan Pena (United States)

== Statistics ==
=== USL Championship ===
As of April 23, 2022

==== Outfield players ====
#	Pos.	Name	GP	GS	Min.	Goals	Assists	A yellow rectangle, denoting the yellow penalty card shown to a player being cautioned	A red rectangle, denoting the red penalty card shown to a player being sent off
3	DF	(United States) Austin Yearwood	3	3	207	0	0	0	0
4	MF	(United States) Sam Hamilton	6	5	480	0	1	0	0
5	DF	(United States) Josh Suggs	2	1	123	0	0	0	0
6	DF	(Comoros) Alexis Souahy	4	4	360	0	0	1	0
7	FW	(Jamaica) Neco Brett	6	5	474	3	0	0	0
10	FW	(El Salvador) Amando Moreno	0	0	0	0	0	0	0
11	MF	(Mexico) Sergio Rivas	5	2	224	1	0	0	0
14	FW	(Serbia) Ilija Ilić	2	0	6	0	0	0	0
15	DF	(Ghana) Rashid Tetteh	4	4	356	0	0	0	0
16	MF	(United States) Will Seymore	5	5	450	0	0	4	0
17	FW	(United States) Jerome Kiesewetter	2	0	19	0	0	1	0
18	MF	(Haiti) Carl Sainté	3	1	67	0	0	0	0
19	FW	(Cameroon) Tabort Etaka Preston	6	5	359	1	0	2	0
22	DF	(United States) Kalen Ryden	1	1	90	0	1	0	0
23	MF	(Uganda) Micheal Azira	2	0	49	0	0	0	0
25	MF	(England) Daniel Bruce	6	5	451	0	2	1	0
26	DF	(Republic of the Congo) Raddy Ovouka	2	0	19	0	0	1	0
33	MF	(United States) Harry Swartz	6	6	514	2	0	1	0
41	MF	(United States) Chris Wehan	6	6	522	0	0	2	0
43	MF	(United States) Justin Portillo	6	6	540	0	4	2	0
45	FW	(United States) Cristian Nava	1	1	90	0	0	0	0

==== Goalkeepers ====
#	Name	GP	GS	Min.	SV	SV%	GA	GAA	SO	A yellow rectangle, denoting the yellow penalty card shown to a player being cautioned	A red rectangle, denoting the red penalty card shown to a player being sent off
1	(Greece) Alex Tambakis	4	4	360	9	69.2%	4	1.000	1	0	0
12	(United States) Ford Parker	0	0	0	0	—	0	—	0	0	0
24	(United States) Cody Mizell	2	2	180	5	71.4%	2	1.000	0	0	0

=== U.S. Open Cup ===
As of April 20, 2022

==== Outfield Players ====
#	Pos.	Name	GP	GS	Min.	Goals	Assists	A yellow rectangle, denoting the yellow penalty card shown to a player being cautioned	A red rectangle, denoting the red penalty card shown to a player being sent off
3	DF	(United States) Austin Yearwood	2	1	134	0	0	0	0
4	MF	(United States) Sam Hamilton	2	1	42	0	0	0	0
6	DF	(Comoros) Alexis Souahy	2	2	136	0	0	0	0
7	FW	(Jamaica) Neco Brett	1	1	90	1	0	1	0
11	MF	(Mexico) Sergio Rivas	1	1	79	0	0	0	0
14	FW	(Serbia) Ilija Ilić	1	1	58	0	0	0	0
15	DF	(Ghana) Rashid Tetteh	1	1	79	0	0	0	0
16	MF	(United States) Will Seymore	2	2	180	0	0	0	0
17	FW	(United States) Jerome Kiesewetter	2	1	109	2	0	1	0
18	MF	(Haiti) Carl Sainté	1	1	90	1	0	0	0
19	FW	(Cameroon) Tabort Etaka Preston	2	0	97	0	0	0	0
23	MF	(Uganda) Micheal Azira	2	1	122	0	0	0	0
25	MF	(England) Daniel Bruce	2	2	136	0	0	1	0
26	DF	(Republic of the Congo) Raddy Ovouka	2	1	134	1	0	0	0
33	MF	(United States) Harry Swartz	1	1	71	0	1	0	0
41	MF	(United States) Chris Wehan	2	2	142	1	0	0	0
43	MF	(United States) Justin Portillo	2	1	101	0	0	0	0

==== Goalkeepers ====
#	Name	GP	GS	Min.	SV	SV%	GA	GAA	SO	A yellow rectangle, denoting the yellow penalty card shown to a player being cautioned	A red rectangle, denoting the red penalty card shown to a player being sent off
12	(United States) Ford Parker	2	2	180	5	71.4%	2	1.00	1	0	0
