= Amando Moreno =

Professional footballer (born 1995)

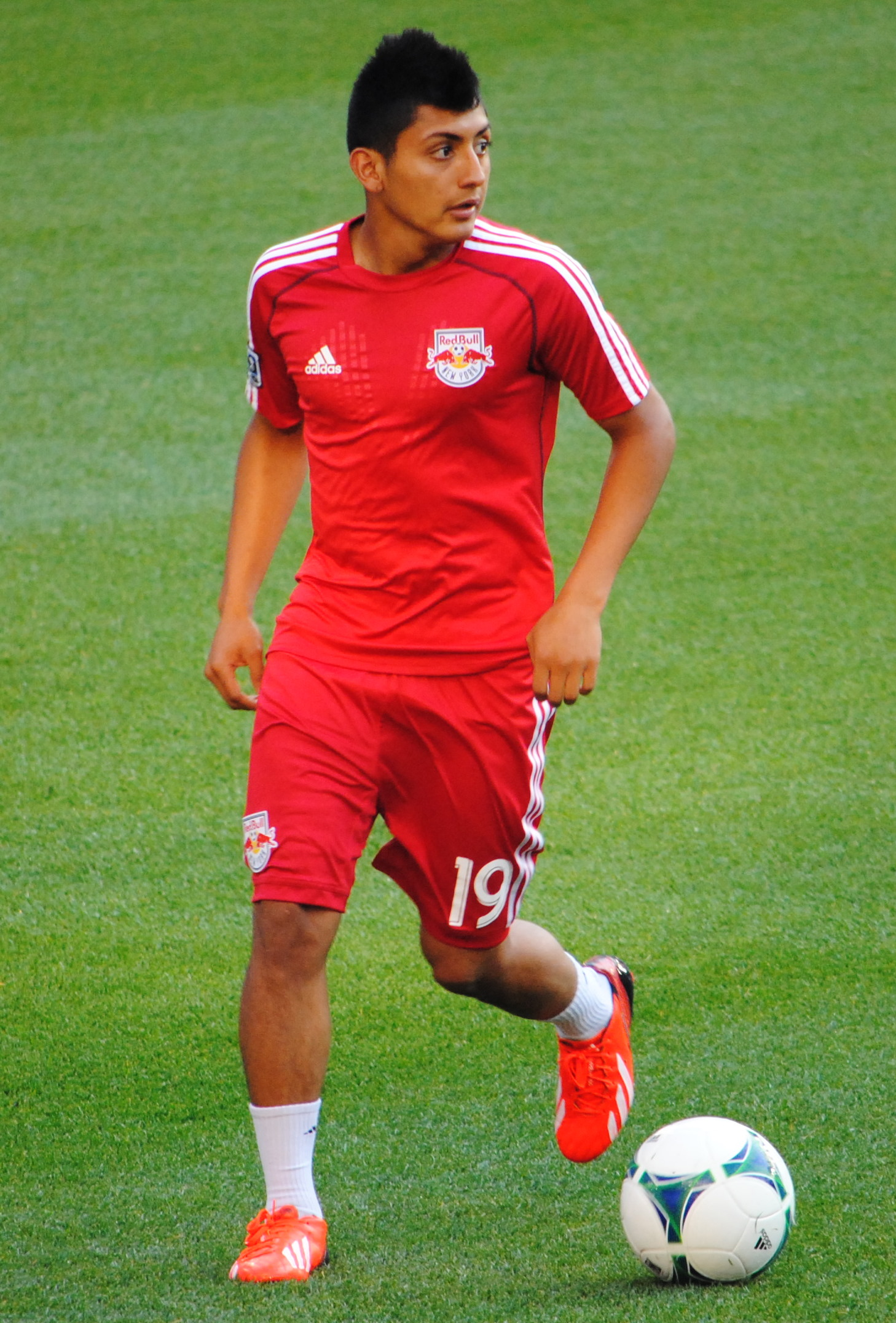
- Amando Moreno training for New York Red Bulls in 2013

Personal information
- Full name: Amando Miguel Moreno Magaña
- Date of birth: September 10, 1995 (age 31)
- Place of birth: Perth Amboy, New Jersey, United States
- Height: 1.70 m (5 ft 7 in)
- Positions: Forward; winger

Team information
- Current team: El Paso Locomotive
- Number: 10

Youth career
- 2009–2013: New York Red Bulls

Senior career*
Years	Team	Apps	(Gls)
2013	New York Red Bulls	2	(0)
2014–2017	Tijuana	25	(5)
2017	→ Dorados (loan)	11	(2)
2018	New York Red Bulls II	30	(11)
2019	Chicago Fire	8	(0)
2020–2023	New Mexico United	85	(24)
2024–	El Paso Locomotive	91	(24)

International career^{‡}
2012–2013	United States U18	8	(3)
2014–2015	United States U20	15	(2)
2021–	El Salvador	15	(0)
- * Club domestic league appearances and goals as of 21:03, 8 November 2026 (UTC) ‡ National team caps and goals as of 14 October 2021

Amando Miguel Moreno Magaña (born September 10, 1995) is a professional footballer who plays as a forward and winger for USL Championship club El Paso Locomotive. Born in the United States, he plays for the El Salvador national team.

== Career ==
=== New York Red Bulls ===
Moreno joined the New York Red Bulls Academy in November 2009 and played for the under-15, under-16, and under-18 sides. While playing for the under-16s Moreno scored 33 goals from 2010 to 2012. He also played at Marlboro High School (New Jersey) for three years, but would forgo his senior season to join the Red Bulls Academy team.

Moreno signed his first professional contract for the New York Red Bulls on December 11, 2012. He made his professional debut for the Red Bulls on March 10, 2013, against the San Jose Earthquakes at Buck Shaw Stadium coming on as a late substitute for Roy Miller in a match the Red Bulls lost 2–1.

=== Club Tijuana ===
Moreno announced his move to Club Tijuana in February 2014. After his previous contract expired, he rejected a new one with the New York Red Bulls and joined Club Tijuana.

On April 16, 2016, Moreno made his Liga MX debut after coming on at the 86th minute in Tijuana's 2–1 loss to Monterrey. Prior to his debut, Moreno had appeared in 15 Copa MX games with Tijuana. He scored his first goal with Tijuana on February 17, 2015, in a 2–2 draw with Zacatepec in Copa MX. On March 3, 2015, he helped lead Tijuana to a 2–0 victory in Copa MX over Universidad de Guadalajara, scoring the final goal of the match.

Moreno was an important player for Tijuana during the Apertura 2016 Copa MX. On July 19, 2016, he scored for Los Xolos in a 3-0 cup victory over Toluca. On August 17, 2016, he scored the lone goal for Tijuana in a 1–1 draw with Lobos BUAP.

=== Dorados de Sinaloa ===
Moreno was sent on loan to Dorados of Ascenso MX during June 2017. On September 12, 2017, he scored his first goal for Dorados in a 2–1 victory over Universidad de Guadalajara in Copa MX. On October 13, 2017, Moreno scored his first league goal for Dorados in a 2–1 loss to Cafetaleros de Tapachula.

=== Return to Red Bulls ===
On January 10, 2018, it was announced that Moreno had returned to his first club signing with New York Red Bulls. He was later waived by the Red Bulls, and signed to New York Red Bulls II on a USL contract. On March 31, 2018, Moreno scored his first two goals for New York in a 5–2 victory over Charleston Battery, for his efforts he was named to the USL Team of the Week. On October 27, 2018, Moreno scored the lone goal for New York in a 1–0 victory over FC Cincinnati, with the victory New York ended Cincinnati's record 24-game unbeaten run and advanced to the Eastern Conference Final for the third straight year.

=== New Mexico United ===
Moreno signed with USL Championship side New Mexico United in December 2019. He was named New Mexico United's Offensive Player of the Year following the 2020 season.

=== International ===
Moreno has represented the United States at the Under-18 level. He was eligible to represent Mexico, due to his father, or El Salvador, due to his mother.

U.S. U-20 MNT head coach Tab Ramos called up Moreno for the U-21 International National Teams Football Tournament from November 9–19 in Marbella, Spain.

Moreno was called up to the United States senior team for a May 2016 friendly against Puerto Rico.

Moreno received a Salvadoran passport in June 2021 making him eligible for inclusion in the El Salvador National Team. On July 1, 2021, Moreno was called up to El Salvador's 2021 CONCACAF Gold Cup squad. He made his senior debut for La Selecta July 4, 2021, in a friendly match against Qatar.

== Honours ==
New York Red Bulls

- MLS Supporters' Shield: 2013

== Career statistics ==
=== Club ===
As of match played 25 October 2025

Club	Season	League			League cup		Domestic cup		Continental		Other		Total	
Club	Season	Division	Apps	Goals	Apps	Goals	Apps	Goals	Apps	Goals	Apps	Goals	Apps	Goals
New York Red Bulls	2013	MLS	2	0	0	0	1 (Note: Appearance(s) in the US Open Cup)	0	—		—		3	0
New York Red Bulls Reserves (loan)	2013	MLS Reserve League	11	1	—		—		—		—		11	1
New York Red Bulls Reserves (loan)	Total		13	1	0	0	1	0	—		—		14	1
Tijuana	2014–15	Liga MX	0	0	—		7 (Note: Includes 3 appearances in Apertura 2014 Copa MX and 4 appearances in Clausura 2015 Copa MX)	2	—		—		7	2
Tijuana	2015–16	Liga MX	4	0	—		10 (Note: Includes 6 appearances in Apertura 2015 Copa MX and 4 in Clausura 2016 Copa MX)	2	—		—		13	1
Tijuana	2016–17	Liga MX	0	0	—		6 (Note: Includes 4 appearances in Apertura 2016 Copa MX and 3 appearances in Clausura 2017 Copa MX)	2	—		—		6	2
Tijuana	Total		4	0	0	0	23	6	—		—		25	5
Dorados	2017–18	Ascenso MX	7	1	—		4 (Note: Appearances in Apertura 2017 Copa MX)	1	—		—		11	2
New York Red Bulls II	2018	USL	27	10	3 (Note: Appearance(s) in USL playoffs)	1	—		—		—		30	11
Chicago Fire	2019	MLS	7	0	—		0	0	1 (Note: Appearance(s) in Leagues Cup)	0	—		8	0
Chicago Fire	Total		41	11	3	1	4	1	1	0	—		52	13
New Mexico United	2020	USL Championship	15	6	2 (Note: Appearance(s) in USL Championship playoffs)	0	—		—		—		17	6
New Mexico United	2021	USL Championship	19	5	—		—		—		—		19	5
New Mexico United	2022	USL Championship	12	3	1	0	0	0	—		—		13	3
New Mexico United	2023	USL Championship	31	10	1	0	2	0	—		—		34	10
New Mexico United	Total		77	24	4	0	2	0	0	0	—		83	24
El Paso Locomotive	2024	USL Championship	29	6	0	0	1	0	—		—		30	6
El Paso Locomotive	2025	USL Championship	28	9	0	0	3	0	—		3 (Note: Includes appearance in USL Cup)	0	34	9
El Paso Locomotive	Total		58	15	0	0	4	0	0	0	3	0	64	15
Career total			192	51	7	1	34	7	1	0	3	0	235	57

=== International ===
As of match played 17 October 2023

National Team	Year	Apps	Goals
El Salvador	2021	4	0
El Salvador	2022	6	0
El Salvador	2023	5	0
Total		15	0
