= El Salvador national football team results (2020–present) =

This article provides details of international football games played by the El Salvador national football team from 2020 to present.

== Results ==
Key
Win
Draw
Defeat

=== 2020 ===
19 January 2020 Friendly	El Salvador	0–1	Iceland	Carson, United States
16:00 UTC−8		Report	Finnbogason 65'	Stadium: Dignity Health Sports Park; Referee: Rubiel Vazquez (United States)

27 March 2020 Friendly	El Salvador	Canceled	Panama	San Salvador, El Salvador
20:00 UTC−6				Stadium: Estadio Cuscatlán
Note: Match canceled due to the COVID-19 pandemic.

9 December 2020 Friendly	United States	6–0	El Salvador	Fort Lauderdale, United States
19:30 UTC−5	Arriola 17'; Mueller 20', 25'; Lletget 23'; Akinola 27'; Aaronson 50'	Report		Stadium: Inter Miami CF Stadium; Attendance: 2,500; Referee: Jose Raul Torres Rivera (Puerto Rico)

=== 2021 ===
25 March 2021 2022 World Cup qualification	El Salvador	2–0	Grenada	San Salvador, El Salvador
20:25 UTC−6	Mayen 23'; Rugamas 46'	Report		Stadium: Estadio Cuscatlán; Attendance: 250; Referee: Kimbell Ward (St. Kitts and Nevis)

28 March 2021 2022 World Cup qualification	Montserrat	1–1	El Salvador	Willemstad, Curaçao
19:00 UTC−4	L. Taylor 89'	Report	Rugamas 4'	Stadium: Ergilio Hato Stadium; Referee: Ricangel de Leça (Aruba)

5 June 2021 2022 World Cup qualification	U.S. Virgin Islands	0–7	El Salvador	Upper Bethlehem, U.S. Virgin Islands
19:00 UTC−4		Report	Monterrosa 23', 86'; J. Portillo 30'; Rugamas 78', 82', 90'; Pérez 79'	Stadium: Bethlehem Soccer Stadium; Referee: Ted Unkel (United States)

8 June 2021 2022 World Cup qualification	El Salvador	3–0	Antigua and Barbuda	San Salvador, El Salvador
19:05 UTC−6	Zavaleta 40'; Rugamas 68'; Martinez 85'	Report		Stadium: Estadio Cuscatlán; Attendance: 550; Referee: Keylor Herrera (Costa Rica)

12 June 2021 2022 World Cup qualification	Saint Kitts and Nevis	0–4	El Salvador	Basseterre, Saint Kitts and Nevis
16:00 UTC−4		Report	Rugamas 3', 27'; Pérez 20'; Cerén 64' (pen.)	Stadium: Warner Park; Attendance: 0 Referee: Kevin Morrison (Jamaica)

15 June 2021 2022 World Cup qualification	El Salvador	2–0	Saint Kitts and Nevis	San Salvador, El Salvador
19:30 UTC−6	Pérez 24'; Mayen 87'	Report		Stadium: Estadio Cuscatlán; Attendance: 0 Referee: Keylor Herrera (Costa Rica)

26 June 2021 Friendly	El Salvador	0–0	Guatemala	Los Angeles, United States
22:00 UTC−6		Report		Stadium: Banc of California Stadium; Referee: Oscar Moncada (Honduras)

4 July 2021 Friendly	Qatar	1–0	El Salvador	Pula, Croatia
18:30 UTC+2	Ali 69'	Report		Stadium: Stadion Aldo Drosina; Referee: Ivan Bebek (Croatia)

11 July 2021 2021 Gold Cup GS	El Salvador	2–0	Guatemala	Frisco, United States
22:00 UTC−5	Roldan 81'; Rivas 90+6'	Report		Stadium: Toyota Stadium; Attendance: 8,494; Referee: Jair Marrufo (United States)

14 July 2021 2021 Gold Cup GS	Trinidad and Tobago	0–2	El Salvador	Frisco, United States
18:30 UTC−5		Report	Henríquez 30'; Martinez 90+1'	Stadium: Toyota Stadium; Attendance: 5,494; Referee: Selvin Brown (Honduras)

18 July 2021 2021 Gold Cup GS	Mexico	1–0	El Salvador	Dallas, United States
21:00 UTC−5	Rodríguez 26'	Report		Stadium: Cotton Bowl; Attendance: 45,792; Referee: Said Martínez (Honduras)

24 July 2021 2021 Gold Cup QF	Qatar	3–2	El Salvador	Glendale, United States
16:30 UTC−7	Ali 2', 55' (pen.); Hatem 8'	Report	Rivas 63', 66'	Stadium: State Farm Stadium; Attendance: 64,211; Referee: Fernando Hernández (Mexico)

21 August 2021 Friendly	El Salvador	0–0	Costa Rica	Carson, United States
20:00 UTC−7		Report		Stadium: Dignity Health Sports Park; Referee: Rubiel Vazquez (United States)

2 September 2021 2022 World Cup qualification	El Salvador	0–0	United States	San Salvador, El Salvador
20:05 UTC−6		Report		Stadium: Estadio Cuscatlán; Attendance: 29,000; Referee: Juan Calderón (Costa Rica)

5 September 2021 2022 World Cup qualification	El Salvador	0–0	Honduras	San Salvador, El Salvador
17:00 UTC−6		Report		Stadium: Estadio Cuscatlán; Attendance: 25,000; Referee: Walter López (Guatemala)

8 September 2021 2022 World Cup qualification	Canada	3–0	El Salvador	Toronto, Canada
19:30 UTC−4	Hutchinson 6'; David 11'; Buchanan 59'	Report		Stadium: BMO Field; Attendance: 15,000; Referee: Ricardo Montero (Costa Rica)

24 September 2021 Friendly	El Salvador	0–2	Guatemala	Washington D.C., United States
20:00 UTC−4		Report	Ramírez 19'; Altán 21'	Stadium: Audi Field; Referee: Tristley Bassue (St. Kitts and Nevis)

7 October 2021 2022 World Cup qualification	El Salvador	1–0	Panama	San Salvador, El Salvador
20:05 UTC−6	Hernández 37'	Report		Stadium: Estadio Cuscatlán; Attendance: 10,000; Referee: Oshane Nation (Jamaica)

10 October 2021 2022 World Cup qualification	Costa Rica	2–1	El Salvador	San José, Costa Rica
16:00 UTC−6	Ruiz 52'; Borges 58' (pen.)	Report	Henríquez 12'	Stadium: Estadio Nacional; Attendance: 5,000; Referee: Said Martínez (Honduras)

13 October 2021 2022 World Cup qualification	El Salvador	0–2	Mexico	San Salvador, El Salvador
20:05 UTC−6		Report	Moreno 30'; Jiménez 90+3' (pen.)	Stadium: Estadio Cuscatlán; Attendance: 31,000; Referee: Drew Fischer (Canada)

5 November 2021 Friendly	El Salvador	0–1	Bolivia	Washington D.C., United States
20:05 UTC−5		Report	Ramallo 71'	Stadium: Audi Field; Referee: Walter López (Guatemala)

12 November 2021 2022 World Cup qualification	El Salvador	1–1	Jamaica	San Salvador, El Salvador
20:00 UTC−6	Roldan 90'	Report	Antonio 82'	Stadium: Estadio Cuscatlán; Attendance: 10,000; Referee: José Raúl Torres Rivera (Puerto Rico)

16 November 2021 2022 World Cup qualification	Panama	2–1	El Salvador	Panama City, Panama
20:05 UTC−5	Waterman 50'; Góndola 52'	Report	Henríquez 1'	Stadium: Estadio Rommel Fernández; Attendance: 15,000; Referee: Marco Ortíz (Mexico)

4 December 2021 Friendly	El Salvador	1–1	Ecuador	Houston, United States
20:00 UTC−6	Villalobos 43'	Report	Carcelén 18'	Stadium: PNC Stadium; Attendance: 10,709; Referee: Randy Solano (Dominican Republic)

11 December 2021 Friendly	El Salvador	0–1	Chile	Los Angeles, United States
15:00 UTC−8		Report	Vegas 90+5'	Stadium: Banc of California Stadium; Referee: Pierre-Luc Lauzière (Canada)

=== 2022 ===
27 January 2022 2022 World Cup qualification	United States	1–0	El Salvador	Columbus, United States
19:00 UTC−5	A. Robinson 52'	Report		Stadium: Lower.com Field; Attendance: 20,000; Referee: Bryan López (Guatemala)

30 January 2022 2022 World Cup qualification	Honduras	0–2	El Salvador	San Pedro Sula, Honduras
18:05 UTC−6		Report	Bonilla 35'; Cerén 90+2'	Stadium: Estadio Olímpico Metropolitano; Attendance: 3,000; Referee: Keylor Herrera (Costa Rica)

2 February 2022 2022 World Cup qualification	El Salvador	0–2	Canada	San Salvador, El Salvador
20:00 UTC−6		Report	Hutchinson 66'; David 90+3'	Stadium: Estadio Cuscatlán; Attendance: 9,000; Referee: Armando Villarreal (United States)

24 March 2022 2022 World Cup qualification	Jamaica	1–1	El Salvador	Kingston, Jamaica
19:00 UTC−5	Gray 72'	Report	Zavaleta 21'	Stadium: Independence Park; Referee: Fernando Hernández (Mexico)

27 March 2022 2022 World Cup qualification	El Salvador	1–2	Costa Rica	San Salvador, El Salvador
15:05 UTC−6	Gil 31'	Report	Contreras 30'; Campbell 45+1'	Stadium: Estadio Cuscatlán; Referee: Daneon Parchment (Jamaica)

30 March 2022 2022 World Cup qualification	Mexico	2–0	El Salvador	Mexico City, Mexico
19:05 UTC−6	Antuna 17'; Jiménez 43' (pen.)	Report		Stadium: Estadio Azteca; Referee: Oshane Nation (Jamaica)

24 April 2022 Friendly	El Salvador	0–4	Guatemala	San Jose, United States
16:00 UTC−7		Report	Morales 25'; Santis 55', 59'; Robles 75'	Stadium: PayPal Park

1 May 2022 Friendly	El Salvador	3–2	Panama	Cary, United States
16:30 UTC−4	Tamacas 34'; Gil 55'; Henríquez 65'	Report	Londoño 5'; Peralta 16' (pen.)	Stadium: WakeMed Soccer Park; Referee: Selvin Brown (Honduras)

4 June 2022 2022–23 Nations League	El Salvador	3–1	Grenada	San Salvador, El Salvador
20:00 UTC−6	Bonilla 2', 43'; Paterson 55' (o.g.)	Report	McQueen 4'	Stadium: Estadio Cuscatlán; Referee: Enrique Santander (Mexico)

7 June 2022 2022–23 Nations League	Grenada	2–2	El Salvador	St. George's, Grenada
19:00 UTC−4	Berkeley-Agyepong 29'; Charles 54'	Report	Larín 35' (pen.); Gil 88'	Stadium: Kirani James Athletic Stadium; Referee: José Torres (Puerto Rico) (Note: Referee Francia González from Mexico, who was originally assigned to the El Salvador v Grenada match, was replaced by José Torres from Puerto Rico.)

14 June 2022 2022–23 Nations League	El Salvador	1–1	United States	San Salvador, El Salvador
20:00 UTC−6	Larín 35'	Report	Morris 90+1'	Stadium: Estadio Cuscatlán; Attendance: 6,313; Referee: César Arturo Ramos (Mexico)

24 September 2022 Friendly	Honduras	Canceled	El Salvador	Unannounced
13:00 UTC−4

27 September 2022 Friendly	Peru	4–1	El Salvador	Washington, D.C., United States
20:00 UTC−4	Zavaleta 19' (o.g.); Lapadula 40' (pen.); Reyna 81'; Cueva 86' (pen.)	Report	Larín 34' (pen.)	Stadium: Audi Field; Referee: Benjamín Pineda (Costa Rica)

=== 2023 ===
22 March 2023 Friendly	El Salvador	0–1	Honduras	Los Angeles, United States
19:00 UTC−7		Report	Cartagena 34' (o.g.)	Stadium: BMO Stadium; Referee: Victor Rivas (United States)

27 March 2023 2022–23 Nations League	United States	1–0	El Salvador	Orlando, United States
19:30 UTC−4	Pepi 62'	Report		Stadium: Exploria Stadium; Attendance: 18,947; Referee: Mario Escobar (Guatemala)

15 June 2023 2023 Kirin Challenge Cup	Japan	6–0	El Salvador	Toyota, Japan
19:10 UTC+9	Taniguchi 1'; Ueda 4' (pen.); Kubo 25'; Dōan 44'; Nakamura 60'; Furuhashi 73'	Report		Stadium: Toyota Stadium; Attendance: 37,403; Referee: Andrew Madley (England)

20 June 2023 Friendly	South Korea	1–1	El Salvador	Daejeon, South Korea
20:00 UTC+9	Hwang Ui-jo 49'	Report	Roldán 87'	Stadium: Daejeon World Cup Stadium; Attendance: 39,823; Referee: Muhammad Taqi (Singapore)

26 June 2023 2023 Gold Cup GS	El Salvador	1–2	Martinique	Fort Lauderdale, United States
18:30 UTC−4	Tamacas 90+5' (pen.)	Report	Burner 11'; Fortuné 16'	Stadium: DRV PNK Stadium; Attendance: 10,101; Referee: Adonai Escobedo (Mexico)

30 June 2023 2023 Gold Cup GS	El Salvador	0–0	Costa Rica	Harrison, United States
20:30 UTC−4		Report		Stadium: Red Bull Arena; Attendance: 22,615; Referee: César Ramos (Mexico)

4 July 2023 2023 Gold Cup GS	Panama	2–2	El Salvador	Houston, United States
19:30 UTC−5	Escobar 26'; Díaz 71'	Report	B. Gil 4'; M. Gil 90+1'	Stadium: Shell Energy Stadium; Attendance: 20,002; Referee: Walter López (Guatemala)

7 September 2023 2023–24 Nations League	Guatemala	2–0	El Salvador	Guatemala City, Guatemala
20:00 UTC−6	Mejía 15'; Altán 78'	Report		Stadium: Estadio Doroteo Guamuch Flores; Attendance: 18,313; Referee: Selvin Brown (Honduras)

10 September 2023 2023–24 Nations League	El Salvador	2–3	Trinidad and Tobago	San Salvador, El Salvador
20:00 UTC−6	Zavaleta 17'; B. Gil 53'	Report	Telfer 22'; Shaw 51' (pen.); Garcia 72'	Stadium: Estadio Jorge "El Mágico" González; Referee: Ricardo Montero (Costa Rica)

13 October 2023 2023–24 Nations League	Martinique	1–0	El Salvador	Fort-de-France, Martinique
19:00 UTC−4	Marajo 23'	Report		Stadium: Stade Pierre-Aliker; Attendance: 877; Referee: César Ramos (Mexico)

17 October 2023 2023–24 Nations League	El Salvador	0–0	Martinique	San Salvador, El Salvador
19:00 UTC−6		Report		Stadium: Estadio Jorge "El Mágico" González; Referee: Drew Fischer (Canada)

16 November 2023 Friendly	Curaçao	1–1	El Salvador	Willemstad, Curaçao
20:00 UTC−4	J. Bacuna 3'	Report	Flores 87'	Stadium: Ergilio Hato Stadium; Referee: Janeishka Caban (Puerto Rico)

20 November 2023 Friendly	Curaçao	1–1	El Salvador	Willemstad, Curaçao
20:00 UTC−4	Janga 19' (pen.)	Report	Vásquez 71'	Stadium: Ergilio Hato Stadium; Referee: Janeishka Caban (Puerto Rico)

=== 2024 ===
19 January 2024 Hybrid friendly	El Salvador	0–0	Inter Miami CF	San Salvador, El Salvador
18:00 UTC−6		Report		Stadium: Estadio Cuscatlán; Referee: Iván Cisneros (El Salvador)

2 February 2024 Friendly	Costa Rica	2–0	El Salvador	San José, Costa Rica
20:00 UTC−6	Daly 20'; Suárez 70'	Report		Stadium: Estadio Nacional; Referee: Steven Madrigal (Costa Rica)

20 March 2024 Non-FIFA friendly	El Salvador	1–1	Bonaire	Washington, D.C., United States
19:00 UTC−4	Punyed 68'	Report	Fuentes 61' (o.g.)	Stadium: Audi Field

22 March 2024 Friendly	Argentina	3–0	El Salvador	Philadelphia, United States
20:00 UTC−4	Romero 16'; Fernández 42'; Lo Celso 52'	Report		Stadium: Lincoln Financial Field; Referee: Victor Rivas (United States)

26 March 2024 Friendly	El Salvador	1–1	Honduras	Houston, United States
19:30 UTC−5	B. Gil 11'	Report	Róchez 62'	Stadium: Shell Energy Stadium; Referee: Rubiel Vazquez (United States)

6 June 2024 2026 World Cup qualification	El Salvador	0–0	Puerto Rico	San Salvador, El Salvador
20:30 UTC−6		Report		Stadium: Estadio Cuscatlán; Attendance: 10,851; Referee: Saíd Martínez (Honduras)

9 June 2024 2026 World Cup qualification	Saint Vincent and the Grenadines	1–3	El Salvador	Paramaribo, Suriname
16:00 UTC−3	Anderson 43'	Report	Henríquez 10'; Tejada 60'; Bonilla 83'	Stadium: Franklin Essed Stadion; Attendance: 200; Referee: Shavin Greene (Guyana)

14 June 2024 Friendly	El Salvador	0–1	Peru	Philadelphia, United States
20:30 UTC−4		Report	Flores 17'	Stadium: Lincoln Financial Field; Referee: Kwinsi Williams (Trinidad and Tobago)

27 July 2024 Friendly	Guatemala	0–1	El Salvador	Carson, United States
19:30 UTC−7		Report	E. Rivas 83'	Stadium: Dignity Health Sports Park; Referee: Oliver Vergara (Panama)

5 September 2024 2024–25 Nations League	Montserrat	1–4	El Salvador	Rincón, Bonaire
16:00 UTC−4	Barzey 28'	Report	Landaverde 9'; Mauricio 63'; Benítez 68'; Santamaría 84' (pen.)	Stadium: Stadion Antonio Trenidat; Referee: Benjamín Pineda (Costa Rica)

8 September 2024 2024–25 Nations League	El Salvador	2–1	Bonaire	Rincón, Bonaire
21:00 UTC−4	Hoeve 45+3' (o.g.); Mauricio 60'	Report	Van der Sande 90+1'	Stadium: Stadion Antonio Trenidat; Referee: Steven Madrigal (Costa Rica)

10 October 2024 2024–25 Nations League	Saint Vincent and the Grenadines	2–3	El Salvador	Kingstown, Saint Vincent and the Grenadines
21:00 UTC−4	John 43'; Adams 63'	Report	Vásquez 20'; Ortíz 70'; Castillo 87'	Stadium: Arnos Vale Stadium; Referee: Oshane Nation (Jamaica)

13 October 2024 2024–25 Nations League	El Salvador	1–2	Saint Vincent and the Grenadines	Kingstown, Saint Vincent and the Grenadines
20:00 UTC−4	Clavel 70'	Report	Adams 38'; Spring 88'	Stadium: Arnos Vale Stadium; Referee: Tristley Bassue (St. Kitts and Nevis)

14 November 2024 2024–25 Nations League	Bonaire	0–1	El Salvador	San Salvador, El Salvador
19:00 UTC−6		Report	Vásquez 83'	Stadium: Estadio Cuscatlán; Referee: Steven Madrigal (Costa Rica)

17 November 2024 2024–25 Nations League	El Salvador	1–0	Montserrat	San Salvador, El Salvador
19:00 UTC−6	Tejada 9'	Report		Stadium: Estadio Cuscatlán; Referee: Sergio Reyna (Guatemala)

=== 2025 ===
19 March 2025 Hybrid friendly	Houston Dynamo	2–1	El Salvador	Houston, United States
19:00 UTC−5	González 6'; Escobar 43'	Report	Henríquez 4'	Stadium: Shell Energy Stadium

22 March 2025 Hybrid friendly	El Salvador	1–1	Pachuca	San Salvador, El Salvador
18:30 UTC−6	Mauricio 58'	Report	Hernández 41' (pen.)	Stadium: Estadio Jorge "El Mágico" González

31 May 2025 Friendly	El Salvador	1–1	Guatemala	Chattanooga, United States
20:00 UTC−5	Ramírez 89'	Report	Lom 40'	Stadium: Finley Stadium

7 June 2025 2026 World Cup qualification	Anguilla	0–3	El Salvador	The Valley, Anguilla
15:00 UTC−4		Report	Ortiz 30'; Gil 45+5'; Alvarado 77'	Stadium: Raymond E. Guishard Technical Centre; Attendance: 543; Referee: Filip Dujic (Canada)

10 June 2025 2026 World Cup qualification	El Salvador	1–1	Suriname	San Salvador, El Salvador
19:00 UTC−6	Gil 32'	Report	Lonwijk 19'	Stadium: Estadio Cuscatlán; Attendance: 20,675; Referee: Jon Freemon (United States)

17 June 2025 2025 Gold Cup GS	Curaçao	0–0	El Salvador	San Jose, United States
17:15 UTC−7		Report		Stadium: PayPal Park; Attendance: 13,042; Referee: Katia García (Mexico)

21 June 2025 2025 Gold Cup GS	Honduras	2–0	El Salvador	Houston, United States
21:00 UTC−5	Quioto 33'; Ramírez 90+5'	Report		Stadium: Shell Energy Stadium; Attendance: 20,536; Referee: Walter López (Guatemala)

24 June 2025 2025 Gold Cup GS	Canada	2–0	El Salvador	Houston, United States
21:00 UTC−5	J. David 53'; Buchanan 56'	Report		Stadium: Shell Energy Stadium; Attendance: 19,417; Referee: Joe Dickerson (United States)

4 September 2025 2026 World Cup qualification	Guatemala	0–1	El Salvador	Guatemala City, Guatemala
20:00 UTC−6		Report	Osorio 79'	Stadium: Estadio Cementos Progreso; Attendance: 13,600; Referee: Juan Calderón (Costa Rica)

8 September 2025 2026 World Cup qualification	El Salvador	1–2	Suriname	San Salvador, El Salvador
18:30 UTC−6	Dijksteel 73' (o.g.)	Report	Balker 12'; Klas 81'	Stadium: Estadio Cuscatlán; Attendance: 28,186; Referee: Adonai González (Mexico)

10 October 2025 2026 World Cup qualification	El Salvador	0–1	Panama	San Salvador, El Salvador
19:00 UTC−6		Report	Fajardo 55'	Stadium: Estadio Cuscatlán; Attendance: 22,805; Referee: Drew Fischer (Canada)

14 October 2025 2026 World Cup qualification	El Salvador	0–1	Guatemala	San Salvador, El Salvador
20:00 UTC−6		Report	Santis 46'	Stadium: Estadio Cuscatlán; Attendance: 26,931; Referee: Pierre-Luc Lauzière (Canada)

13 November 2025 2026 World Cup qualification	Suriname	4–0	El Salvador	Paramaribo, Suriname
19:00 UTC−3	Chery 44' (pen.); Margaret 74', 76'; Klas 83'	Report		Stadium: Franklin Essed Stadion; Referee: Oshane Nation (Jamaica)

18 November 2025 2026 World Cup qualification	Panama	3–0	El Salvador	Panama City, Panama
20:00 UTC−5	Blackman 17'; Davis 45+4' (pen.); Rodríguez 85'	Report		Stadium: Estadio Rommel Fernández; Attendance: 21,255; Referee: Saíd Martínez (Honduras)

=== 2026 ===
26 March 2026 2025–26 CONCACAF Series	Dominican Republic	2–2	El Salvador	Santiago, Dominican Republic
20:00 UTC−4	Firpo 15'; Romero 90+4'	Report	Ordaz 62', 78'	Stadium: Estadio Cibao FC; Referee: Oliver Vergara (Panama)

29 March 2026 2025–26 CONCACAF Series	Martinique	0–1	El Salvador	Santiago, Dominican Republic
16:00 UTC−4		Report	M. Gil 90+2'	Stadium: Estadio Cibao; Referee: Jefferson Escobar (Honduras)

3 June 2026 Friendly	South Korea	1–0	El Salvador	Sandy, United States
19:00 UTC−6	Lee Dong-gyeong 57'	Report		Stadium: America First Field; Referee: Natalie Simon (United States)

6 June 2026 Friendly	El Salvador	0–0	Qatar	Los Angeles, United States
13:00 UTC−7		Report		Stadium: BMO Stadium; Referee: Rubiel Vazquez (United States)

25 September 2026 2026–27 Nations League	El Salvador	3–1	Martinique	San Salvador, El Salvador
21:00 UTC−6	B. Gil 8', 18'; Osorio 29'	Report	Antiste 51' (pen.)	Stadium: Estadio Jorge "El Mágico" González; Attendance: 6,095; Referee: Pierre-Luc Lauzière (Canada)

28 September 2026 2026–27 Nations League	Guatemala	6–0	El Salvador	Guatemala City, Guatemala
20:00 UTC−6	Lom 8'; Rubín 28'; Fajardo 32', 89', 90+2'; Aparicio 56'	Report		Stadium: Estadio Manuel Felipe Carrera; Attendance: 4,826; Referee: Luis Enrique Santander (Mexico)

2 October 2026 2026–27 Nations League	El Salvador	0–2	Jamaica	San Salvador, El Salvador
20:00 UTC−6		Report	East 39', 64'	Stadium: Estadio Cuscatlán; Attendance: 9,306; Referee: Adonai Escobedo (Mexico)

5 October 2026 2026–27 Nations League	Martinique	1–1	El Salvador	Fort-de-France, Martinique
18:00 UTC−4	Antiste 56'	Report	Valladares 3'	Stadium: Stade Pierre-Aliker; Attendance: 1,170; Referee: Tori Penso (United States)

13 November 2026 2026–27 Nations League Play-in	Saint Martin	0–2	El Salvador	Basseterre, Saint Kitts and Nevis
19:00 UTC−4		Report	B. Gil 34'; Cerritos 83'	Stadium: SKNFA Technical Center; Referee: Katia García (Mexico)

17 November 2026 2026–27 Nations League Play-in	El Salvador	3–1 (5–1 agg.)	Saint Martin	San Salvador, El Salvador
19:00 UTC−6	Osorio 45'; B. Gil 46', 83'	Report	Dumas 45+3'	Stadium: Estadio Jorge "El Mágico" González; Referee: Armando Villarreal (United States)
Note: El Salvador won 5–1 on aggregate and qualified for the 2027 Gold Cup qualification.

== Head-to-head records ==
Head to head records
Opponent	Pld	W	D	L	GF	GA	W%	D%	L%
Anguilla	1	1	0	0	3	0	100	0	0
Antigua and Barbuda	1	1	0	0	3	0	100	0	0
Argentina	1	0	0	1	0	3	0	0	100
Bolivia	1	0	0	1	0	1	0	0	100
Bonaire	3	2	1	0	4	2	66.67	33.33	0
Canada	3	0	0	3	0	7	0	0	100
Chile	1	0	0	1	0	1	0	0	100
Costa Rica	5	0	2	3	2	6	0	40	60
Curaçao	3	0	3	0	2	2	0	100	0
Dominican Republic	1	0	1	0	2	2	0	100	0
Ecuador	1	0	1	0	1	1	0	100	0
Grenada	3	2	1	0	7	3	66.67	33.33	0
Guatemala	11	3	2	7	5	17	27.27	18.18	54.55
Honduras	5	1	2	2	3	4	20	40	40
Iceland	1	0	0	1	0	1	0	0	100
Jamaica	3	0	2	1	2	4	0	66.67	33.33
Japan	1	0	0	1	0	6	0	0	100
Martinique	6	2	2	2	6	5	33.33	33.33	33.33
Mexico	3	0	0	3	0	5	0	0	100
Montserrat	3	2	1	0	6	2	66.67	33.33	0
Panama	6	2	1	3	7	10	33.33	16.67	50
Peru	2	0	0	2	1	5	0	0	100
Puerto Rico	1	0	1	0	0	0	0	100	0
Qatar	3	0	1	2	2	4	0	33.33	66.67
Saint Kitts and Nevis	2	2	0	0	6	0	100	0	0
Saint Martin	2	2	0	0	5	1	100	0	0
Saint Vincent and the Grenadines	3	2	0	1	7	5	66.67	0	33.33
South Korea	2	0	1	1	1	2	0	50	50
Suriname	3	0	1	2	2	7	0	33.33	66.67
Trinidad and Tobago	2	1	0	1	4	3	50	0	50
United States	5	0	2	3	1	9	0	40	60
U.S. Virgin Islands	1	1	0	0	7	0	100	0	0
Totals	89	24	25	42	89	117	26.97	28.09	47.19
