= Harry Swartz =

American professional soccer player

Personal information
- Full name: Harrison Swartz
- Date of birth: March 19, 1996 (age 30)
- Place of birth: Needham, Massachusetts, United States
- Height: 5 ft 9 in (1.75 m)
- Positions: Full back; winger; forward

College career
Years	Team	Apps	(Gls)
2014–2018	Northeastern Huskies	71	(5)

Senior career*
Years	Team	Apps	(Gls)
2015	Ocean City Nor'easters	12	(1)
2016–2017	Boston Bolts	23	(12)
2018	Brazos Valley Cavalry	0	(0)
2019–2020	Hartford Athletic	27	(5)
2021–2024	New Mexico United	88	(15)
- * Club domestic league appearances and goals as of December 30, 2024

Harrison "Harry" Swartz (born March 19, 1996) is an American retired professional soccer player who played as a midfielder.

== Career ==
Swartz is from Needham, Massachusetts. He played soccer at Needham High School, where he was a 2011 Bay State League First Team pick after breaking the school record for most points as a sophomore. In 2012, he was a silver medalist with the United States in the 2012 Pan American Games in Sao Paulo, Brazil. In 2013, he was rated among the top 150 high school seniors by College Soccer News.

=== College and amateur ===
Swartz spent five years playing college soccer at Northeastern University between 2014 and 2018, scoring 5 goals and tallying 5 assists in 71 appearances. He served as a three-year team captain and was a two-time team MVP during his tenure with the Huskies. Swartz is Jewish, and was named to the 2017 Jewish Sports Review Division 1 Men's Soccer All-America Team, along with Sam Raben and Jake Rozhansky.

Swartz also played for USL PDL sides Ocean City Nor'easters, Boston Bolts and Brazos Valley Cavalry.

=== Hartford Athletic ===
On May 3, 2019, Swartz signed for USL Championship side Hartford Athletic. Swartz was named team MVP for the 2019 season and re signed with Hartford for the 2020 season.

=== New Mexico United ===
Following the 2020 season, it was announced that Swartz would join New Mexico United ahead of 2021. [10] Throughout his time with the club, he recorded 16 goals and 7 assists across 96 matches in all competitions. Swartz earned USL Championship Player of the Week honors twice, first in Week 32 of the 2022 season after scoring two goals in a win over LA Galaxy II that clinched a playoff berth, and again in Week 24 of the 2024 season after returning from a concussion to score three goals across two matches. Swartz announced his retirement on December 30, 2024.

== Career statistics ==
As of match played April 23, 2022

Club	Season	League			Domestic Cup		League Cup		Total	
Club	Season	Division	Apps	Goals	Apps	Goals	Apps	Goals	Apps	Goals
Boston Bolts	2016	USL PDL	13	4	—		—		13	4
Boston Bolts	2017	USL PDL	10	8	—		—		10	8
Boston Bolts	Total		23	12	—		—		23	12
Brazos Valley Cavalry FC	2018	USL PDL	0	0	—		0	0	0	0
Hartford Athletic	2019	USL Championship	20	4	1 (Note: Appearance(s) in the US Open Cup)	1	—		21	5
Hartford Athletic	2020	USL Championship	7	1	—		—		7	1
Hartford Athletic	Total		27	5	1	1	—		28	6
New Mexico United	2021	USL Championship	12	0	—		—		12	0
New Mexico United	2022	USL Championship	6	2	1	0	—		7	2
New Mexico United	Total		18	2	1	0	0	0	19	2
Career total			68	19	2	1	0	0	70	20
