= Christopher Ramírez (footballer, born 1994) =

Guatemalan footballer

Personal information
- Full name: Christopher Bernabé Ramírez Ulrich
- Date of birth: 8 January 1994 (age 32)
- Place of birth: San Cristóbal Verapaz, Guatemala
- Height: 1.75 m (5 ft 9 in)
- Position: Midfielder

Youth career
- Cobán Imperial
- 2011–2012: Philadelphia Union
- 2012: PA Classics Academy
- Fortuna Sittard

Senior career*
Years	Team	Apps	(Gls)
- Lutlommel
2016	Carchá		
2016–2017	Sävsjö		
2017–2019	Nässjö		
2019	Guastatoya	18	(4)
2019–2020	Antigua	18	(1)
2020–2021	Sanarate	30	(5)
2021–2022	Xelajú	39	(2)
2022	Mixco	12	(0)

International career
2009	Guatemala U16		
2010–2011	Guatemala U17	6	(0)
2020–2021	Guatemala	4	(1)
- * Club domestic league appearances and goals

Christopher Bernabé Ramírez Ulrich (born 8 January 1994), commonly known as Cox, is a Guatemalan professional footballer who plays as an attacking midfielder in Guatemala's top flight Liga Nacional.

== International career ==
He made his debut for the senior men's Guatemalan team against Mexico on 1 October 2020 in the Estadio Azteca.

He scored his first international goal with the senior men's national team in a friendly against El Salvador on 21 September 2021, at Audi Field in Washington DC.

== Career statistics ==
=== International goals ===
Scores and results list Guatemala's goal tally first.

No.	Date	Venue	Opponent	Score	Result	Competition
1.	24 September 2021	Audi Field, Washington, D.C., United States	El Salvador	1–0	2–0	Friendly
