= Peter Trevisani =

American businessman and investor (born 1968)

Peter John Trevisani (born January 3, 1968) is an American businessman, investor, and founding CEO and president of USL Championship soccer club New Mexico United.

== Early life and career ==
Peter Trevisani played college football as a linebacker for the Boston College Eagles alongside Darren Flutie and Mark Chmura. [2i] He graduated with a B.A. in marketing, and later with an MBA in finance from Columbia University. Early in his career he worked at Lehman Brothers in London from 1996 to 1999. Trevisani founded Waybid, which created liquidity for business-to-business marketplaces, and served as the company's CEO. Waybid was backed by Venture Capital firms Draper Fisher Jurvetson and RRE Ventures.

== Thornburg ==
In 2001 Trevisani became the first director of the institutional group at Thornburg Investment Management, in charge of internationalizing the availability of Thornburg Funds. Under his purview the arm grew from $300 million in managed assets in 2001 to $27 billion in 2012. In 2013, Trevisani became the head of global distribution and president of Thornburg Global Investment, based in London, UK, where he worked until 2015.

== Treventures ==
Trevisani founded Treventures in 2015 with a focus on immersive theatre. Some of his collaborations include Area15, Third Rail Projects and the Santa Fe art collective Meow Wolf. Treventures is also an investor in Natural Partners Fullscript, KraneShares, CodaWorks, Patrick's Soda, Venezia F.C., Meow Wolf and New Mexico United.

== New Mexico United ==
In 2018 Trevisani co-founded the United Soccer League Championship expansion club New Mexico United. He serves as the team's CEO, co-owner, and president. In its inaugural season the club has made the Quarterfinals of the Lamar Hunt U.S. Open Cup, led the league in attendance and merchandise sales, also sitting at the top of the table for the first half of the season.

In February 2020, New Mexico United announced the beginning stages of developing a home stadium/community culture center after being awarded $4.1 million in capital outlay funds by the state legislature. In March 2020, the USL Championship postponed the 2020 season with the onset of the COVID-19 pandemic. The season restarted in July 2020 with a modified gameplay model. Due to ongoing state health orders, the team played every game on the road earning the nickname the "Road Warriors." The team ended the regular season with a record of 8 wins, 3 draws, and 4 losses. The team qualified for the USL Championship Playoffs and made it to the semi-final round where they lost against rival El Paso Locomotive via a 5-3 penalty kick shootout.

Additionally, in March 2020, Trevisani approved the launch of the Somos Unidos Foundation, the nonprofit arm of the New Mexico United organization. Throughout 2020, the foundation led multiple community support initiatives including, partnering with Heart of America to bring distance learning supplies to Navajo Nation students, launching the inaugural Diversity Fellowship Program, and working with the Community Desk Project to build desks for children in need of at home learning spaces.

== Immersive Theatre/ Arts ==
In 2018, Trevisani supported the international immersive theatre performance company Third Rail Projects where he Associate Produced the documentary, Between Yourself and Me, in conjunction with Dance Films Association which is available for viewing on Amazon and Vimeo. In 2019 Trevisani was credited on Season 1, Episode 9 of the talk-show, Don't Sweat the Small Stuff, titled Why is fútbol the biggest sport in the world?

Trevisani is a co-producer on "Job The Play", a Broadway play starring Peter Friedman and Sydney Lemmon.

== Personal life ==
Born just outside of Boston, Massachusetts, the youngest of four Trevisani spent time in Weston, Massachusetts, New York City, New York and London, U.K. before settling in Santa Fe, New Mexico, where he now lives with his wife, Wendy Trevisani, former managing director at Thornburg Investment Management, and their three children. Trevisani practices health and fitness through extensive participation in CrossFit and mountain biking which led to him to start a health quest called, Project 47.

On April 22, 2020, New Mexico governor Michelle Lujan Grisham named Trevisani to an economic recovery council regarding the reopening of New Mexico businesses amid the COVID-19 pandemic.
