= Cristian Nava =

American soccer player (born 2003)

Personal information
- Date of birth: September 2, 2003 (age 23)
- Place of birth: Albuquerque, New Mexico, U.S.
- Height: 5 ft 3 in (1.60 m)
- Position: Forward

Team information
- Current team: New Mexico United
- Number: 11

Youth career
- Guadalajara Scorpions
- New Mexico Rush
- Rio Rapids
- 2021: New Mexico United

Senior career*
| Years | Team | Apps | (Gls) |
| 2021–2023 | New Mexico United | 22 | (2) |
| 2026– | New Mexico United | 24 | (1) |
- * Club domestic league appearances and goals as of 10:01, 10 November 2026 (UTC)

Cristian Nava (born September 2, 2003) is an American soccer player who plays for New Mexico United in the USL Championship.

== Career ==
=== Youth ===
On January 25, 2021, Nava joined the New Mexico United academy ahead of its inaugural season. He had previously played with Guadalajara Scorpions, New Mexico Rush, and Rio Rapids. On June 8, 2021, Nava signed a USL academy contract with New Mexico allowing him to compete for their USL Championship side whilst maintaining his college eligibility.

Nava made his debut on July 9, 2021, appearing as a 71st-minute substitute during a 3–1 win over Colorado Springs Switchbacks.

=== Professional career ===
On August 21, 2021, Nava signed a professional contract with New Mexico United. He scored his first professional goal on May 24, 2022, in a 7–0 victory over Phoenix Rising FC.

On January 1, 2025, Nava announced his retirement from professional soccer while recovering from his 2nd ACL injury.

In February 2026, following successful rehabilitation, Nava rescinded his retirement announcement and was resigned by New Mexico United for the 2026 USL Championship season. In his first start since returning to soccer, Nava scored a 90th minute winner in a 3–2 victory over NPSL club Cruizers FC in the first round of the 2026 U.S. Open Cup.
