= Will Seymore =

American soccer player (born 1992)

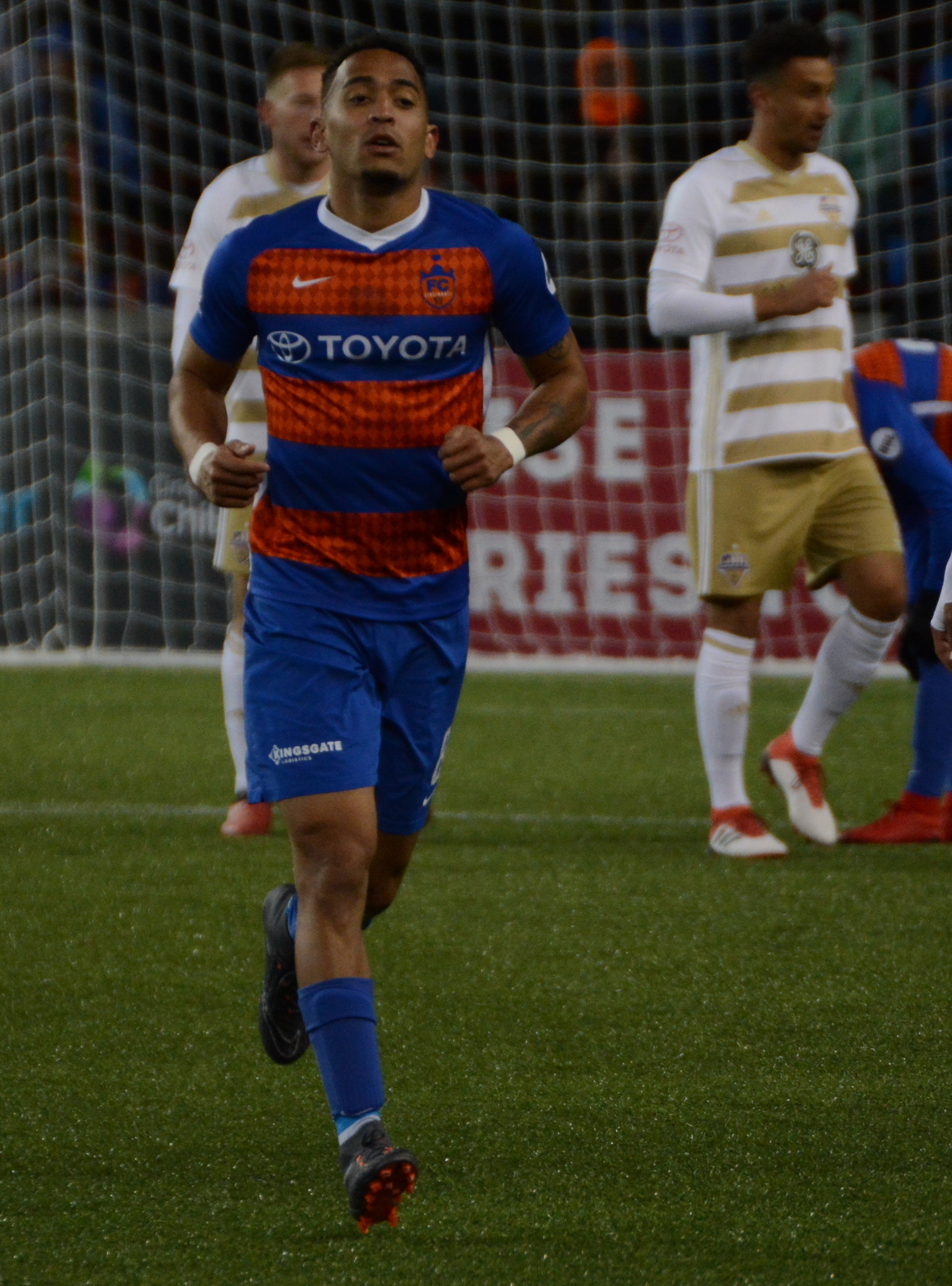
- Seymore playing for FC Cincinnati in 2018

Personal information
- Full name: William Seymore
- Date of birth: February 29, 1992 (age 34)
- Place of birth: Soham, England
- Height: 6 ft 0 in (1.83 m)
- Position: Midfielder

Youth career
- Colchester United
- Cambridge United

College career
Years	Team	Apps	(Gls)
2011–2014	Oregon State Beavers	73	(7)

Senior career*
Years	Team	Apps	(Gls)
2008–2011	Soham Town Rangers		
2012–2014	Portland Timbers U23s	24	(1)
2015	FC Dallas	0	(0)
2015	Lane United	7	(0)
2015–2017	Whitecaps FC 2	59	(0)
2018	FC Cincinnati	5	(0)
2018	→ Reno 1868 (loan)	4	(0)
2019	Reno 1868	21	(0)
2020	Sligo Rovers	19	(0)
2021	Finn Harps	33	(2)
2022–2026	New Mexico United	113	(3)
- * Club domestic league appearances and goals as of August 24, 2026

William Seymore (born February 29, 1992) is professional soccer player who last played as a midfielder for New Mexico United in the USL Championship. Born in England, he is eligible to play for the United States national team.

== Early life and college ==
Seymore spent his youth career in England with Colchester United and Cambridge United Academy along with playing for Cambridgeshire FA county team and England U18 schoolboys. He then joined Soham Town Rangers before signing a letter of intent to play college soccer at Oregon State University.

A four-year starter at Oregon State University, he made a total of 73 appearances for the Beavers and tallied seven goals and nine assists. Earning PAC-12 second-team honors, PAC-12 honorable mention and TopDrawerSoccer top 100 freshman list.

== Club career ==
He also played in the Premier Development League for Portland Timbers U23s.

On January 20, 2015, Seymore was drafted in the third round (56th overall) of the 2015 MLS SuperDraft by FC Dallas. However he was cut from camp and would later join Lane United FC where he made seven appearances.

On July 9, Seymore signed a professional contract with USL club Whitecaps FC 2. He made his professional debut a week later in a 2–2 draw against Colorado Springs Switchbacks FC.

Following Whitecaps FC 2 folding, Seymore joined FC Cincinnati on November 21, 2017.

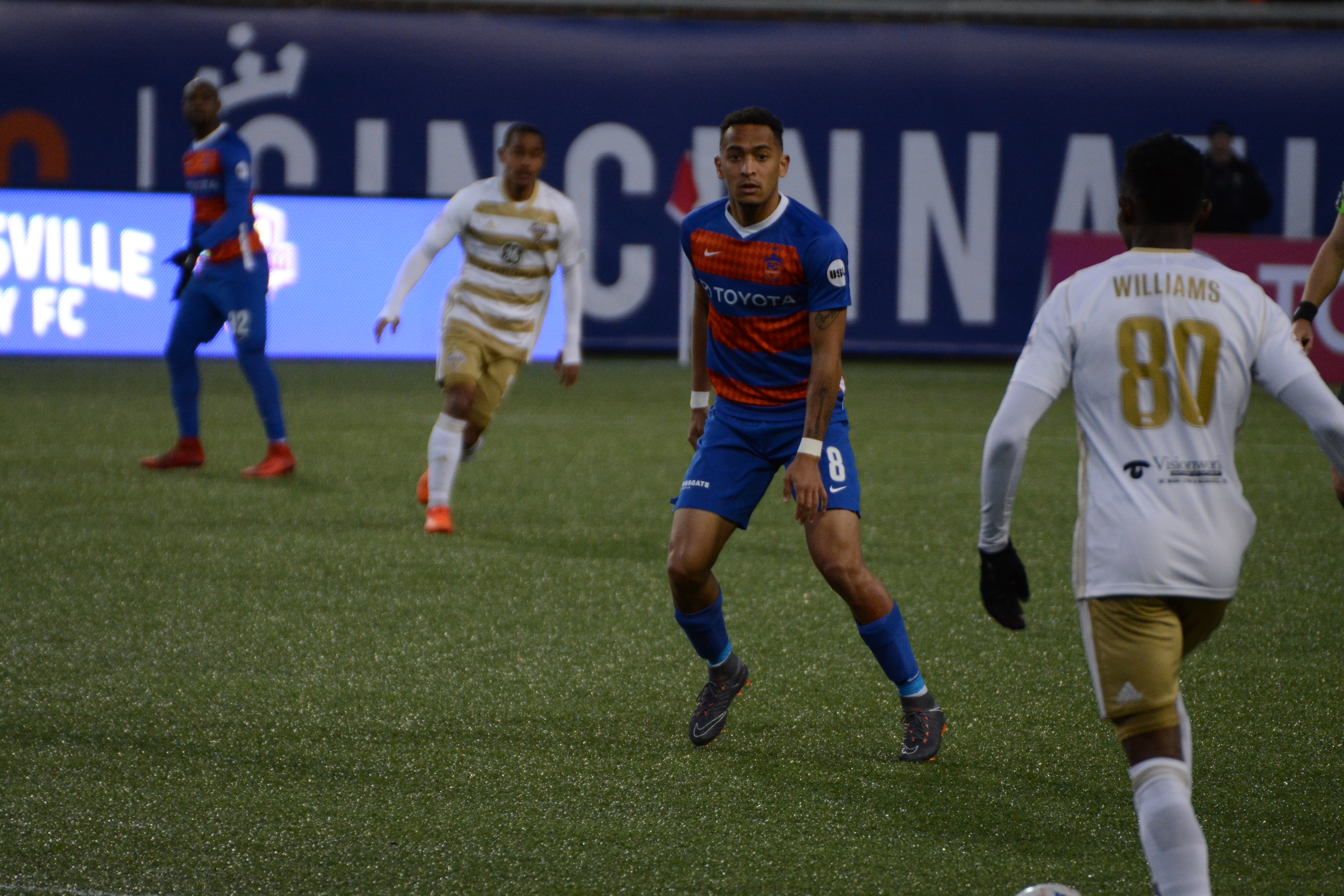
Seymore playing for FC Cincinnati in 2018.

Following a successful loan spell at the end of the 2018 season, Seymore joined Reno 1868 permanently on January 10, 2019, where he helped them reach a conference semi-final and finish 2nd in the regular season.

=== Sligo Rovers ===
Seymore signed for League of Ireland Premier Division side Sligo Rovers on 9 December 2019.

In a stop-start season, shortened, due to the COVID-19 pandemic, to an 18-game league season, he made 13 appearances in the League, as Sligo finished in fourth place, qualifying for the Europa Conference League.

Seymore made a further two appearances in the FAI Cup as Sligo reached the semi-final, before losing to eventual runners-up, Shamrock Rovers.

=== Finn Harps ===
Seymore signed for Finn Harps ahead of the 2021 League of Ireland Premier Division season.

=== New Mexico United ===
On January 2, 2022, Seymore returned to the United States to sign with USL Championship side New Mexico United. He helped the club reach 3 playoffs in three years and helped the club finish 1st in the western conference regular season, the first time in club history. On August 24, 2026 New Mexico United announced the mutual termination of Seymore's contract.
