= 2024 San Antonio FC season =

San Antonio FC
2024 season
- Owner: Spurs Sports & Entertainment
- Head coach: Alen Marcina
- Stadium: Toyota Field
- USLC: Western Conference: 11th Overall: 22nd
- U.S. Open Cup: Round of 32
- Copa Tejas: 2nd
- Copa Tejas Shield: 4th
- Top goalscorer: League: Juan Agudelo (7 goals); All: Juan Agudelo (7 goals)
- Highest home attendance: 7,546 vs Monterey Bay FC (March 30)
- Lowest home attendance: 5,535 vs FC Tulsa (August 3)
- Average home league attendance: League: 6,613; Playoffs:
- Biggest win: 2–0 (March 23 vs Colorado Springs Switchbacks FC); 3–1 (April 20 at Hartford Athletic)
- Biggest defeat: 0–3 (June 19 at Birmingham Legion FC)
Home colors	Away colors

The 2024 San Antonio FC season was the club's ninth season of existence. Including the San Antonio Thunder of the original NASL and the former San Antonio Scorpions of the modern NASL, it is the 15th season of professional soccer in San Antonio. The club plays in the USL Championship, the second division of the United States soccer league system, and will participate in the U.S. Open Cup.

== Club ==
=== Coaching staff ===
Position	Staff
Head coach	(Canada) Alen Marcina
Assistant coach	(United States) Victor Lonchuk
Assistant coach	(Croatia) Dario Pot
SAFC Pro Academy Director & Director of Goalkeeping	(Mexico) Juan Lamadrid
Equipment Manager	(United States) Rashad Moore
Head athletic trainer	(United States) Jesse Lowrance
Assistant Athletic Trainer	(United States) Alex Saldana

Source: San Antonio FC

=== Other information ===
Owner	(United States) Spurs Sports & Entertainment
Chairman	(United States) Peter J. Holt
Sporting Director	(United States) Marco Ferruzzi
Ground (capacity and dimensions)	Toyota Field (8,200 / 110x70 yards)
Training Ground	S.T.A.R. Soccer Complex

Source: San Antonio FC

== Squad information ==
=== First team squad ===
As of August 20, 2024.

Squad No.	Name	Nationality	Position(s)	Date of birth (age)
Goalkeepers
1	Pablo Sisniega	(Mexico)	GK	July 7, 1995 (age 30)
21	Kendall McIntosh	(United States)	GK	January 24, 1994 (age 32)
50	Brandon Gongora	(United States)	GK	
Defenders
2	Carter Manley	(United States)	DF	April 29, 1996 (age 29)
3	Mitchell Taintor	(United States)	DF	September 11, 1994 (age 31)
4	Nelson Blanco	(El Salvador)	DF	August 17, 1999 (age 26)
5	Kendall Burks	(United States)	DF	October 8, 1999 (age 26)
12	Lucas Silva	(Brazil)	DF	February 19, 1997 (age 29)
22	Shannon Gomez	(Trinidad and Tobago)	DF	October 5, 1996 (age 29)
23	Rece Buckmaster	(United States)	DF	July 7, 1996 (age 29)
40	Richard Windbichler	(Austria)	DF	April 2, 1991 (age 34)
48	Giovanni Padilla	(United States)	DF	March 23, 2006 (age 19)
66	Trova Boni	(Burkina Faso)	DF	December 21, 1999 (age 26)
Midfielders
6	Mohamed Omar	(Somalia)	MF	January 22, 1999 (age 27)
7	Luke Haakenson	(United States)	MF	September 10, 1997 (age 28)
8	Sofiane Djeffal	(France)	MF	April 19, 1999 (age 26)
10	Jorge Hernández	(Mexico)	MF	November 8, 2000 (age 25)
13	Bura Nogueira	(Guinea-Bissau)	MF	December 22, 1995 (age 30)
27	Kevon Lambert	(Jamaica)	MF	March 22, 1997 (age 28)
42	Andy Bacho	(United States)	MF	December 24, 2006 (age 19)
43	Landry Walker	(United States)	MF	May 15, 2009 (age 16)
44	Dalziel Ozuna	(United States)	MF	March 5, 2007 (age 19)
49	Adrian Valencia	(United States)	MF	January 27, 2006 (age 20)
59	Jesús Brígido	(Mexico)	MF	
Forwards
9	Jake LaCava	(United States)	FW	January 12, 2001 (age 25)
11	Kameron Lacey	(Jamaica)	FW	January 16, 2001 (age 25)
17	Juan Agudelo	(United States)	FW	November 23, 1992 (age 33)
18	Hugo Mbongue	(Canada)	FW	July 27, 2004 (age 21)
19	Luis Solignac	(Argentina)	FW	February 16, 1991 (age 35)
41	Jake Salas	(United States)	FW	September 30, 2005 (age 20)
46	Eduardo Fernandez	(United States)	FW	April 25, 2006 (age 19)
47	Izaiah Garza	(United States)	FW	August 22, 2006 (age 19)
80	Machop Chol	(South Sudan)	FW	November 14, 1998 (age 27)

== Player movement ==
=== In ===
Pos	Player	Previous club	Fee	Date	Source
MF	(Somalia) Mohamed Omar	(Canada) HFX Wanderers FC	Undisclosed	December 11, 2023	
FW	(Argentina) Luis Solignac	(United States) El Paso Locomotive FC	Undisclosed	December 14, 2023	
FW	(United States) Juan Agudelo	(United States) Birmingham Legion FC	Undisclosed	December 21, 2023	
GK	(Mexico) Pablo Sisniega	(United States) Crown Legacy FC	Undisclosed	January 12, 2024	
FW	(Jamaica) Kameron Lacey	(United States) Minnesota United FC 2	Undisclosed	January 17, 2024	
DF	(Brazil) Lucas Silva	(Portugal) C.D. Feirense	Undisclosed	January 18, 2024	
MF	(Guinea-Bissau) Bura Nogueira	(Iran) Sanat Mes Kerman F.C.	Undisclosed	January 19, 2024	
MF	(United States) Luke Haakenson	(United States) Nashville SC	Undisclosed	January 23, 2024	
DF	(Austria) Richard Windbichler	(China) Chengdu Rongcheng F.C.	Undisclosed	January 25, 2024	
DF	(United States) Kendall Burks	(United States) Chicago Fire FC	Undisclosed	February 6, 2024	
GK	(United States) Kendall McIntosh	(United States) Sporting Kansas City	Undisclosed	February 14, 2024	
GK	(United States) Brandon Gongora	(United States) SAFC Pro Academy	Undisclosed	March 22, 2024	
MF	(United States) Dalziel Ozuna	(United States) SAFC Pro Academy	Undisclosed	March 22, 2024	
FW	(South Sudan) Machop Chol	(United States) Atlanta United FC	Undisclosed	April 2, 2024	
MF	(United States) Andy Bacho	(United States) SAFC Pro Academy	Undisclosed	March 8, 2024	
FW	(United States) Izaiah Garza	(United States) SAFC Pro Academy	Undisclosed	March 8, 2024	
FW	(United States) Jake Salas	(United States) SAFC Pro Academy	Undisclosed	March 8, 2024	
MF	(United States) Adrian Valencia	(United States) SAFC Pro Academy	Undisclosed	March 8, 2024	
MF	(United States) Landry Walker	(United States) SAFC Pro Academy	Undisclosed	March 8, 2024	
FW	(United States) Jake LaCava	(United States) Charleston Battery	Undisclosed	June 4, 2024	
DF	(United States) Nelson Blanco	(United States) North Carolina FC	Undisclosed	June 14, 2024	
DF	(United States) Rece Buckmaster	(United States) Hartford Athletic	Undisclosed	July 15, 2024	
MF	(France) Sofiane Djeffal	(United States) Orange County SC	Undisclosed	July 22, 2024	

=== Out ===
Pos	Player	Transferred To	Fee	Date	Source
FW	(United States) Justin Dhillon	(United States) El Paso Locomotive FC	Undisclosed	December 6, 2023	
MF	(United States) Jacori Hayes	(United States) North Carolina FC	Undisclosed	December 18, 2023	
MF	(Venezuela) Juan Carlos Azócar	(United States) Phoenix Rising FC	Undisclosed	December 19, 2023	
DF	(United States) Connor Maloney	Retired	Undisclosed	December 20, 2023	
DF	(France) Fabien Garcia	(United States) Las Vegas Lights FC	Mutual termination	January 11, 2024	
GK	(United States) Jordan Farr	(United States) Tampa Bay Rowdies	Undisclosed	January 23, 2024	
MF	(Brazil) PC	(United States) Union Omaha	Undisclosed	February 6, 2024	
FW	(Colombia) Santiago Patiño	(Vietnam) Ho Chi Minh City FC	Undisclosed	March 18, 2024	
MF	(Ghana) Mohammed Abu	Retired	Undisclosed	March 29, 2024	

=== Loan in ===
Pos	Player	Loaned From	Start	End	Source
DF	(Burkina Faso) Trova Boni	(Portugal) B-SAD	January 18, 2024	End of season	
MF	(Jamaica) Kevon Lambert	(United States) Real Salt Lake	February 19, 2024	End of season	
FW	(Canada) Hugo Mbongue	(Canada) Toronto FC	March 5, 2024	End of season	
FW	(Colombia) José Mulato	(United States) FC Dallas	March 6, 2024	June 27, 2024	
MF	(Mexico) Jesús Brígido	(Mexico) C.D. Guadalajara	August 14, 2024	End of season	

=== Loan out ===
Pos	Player	Loaned To	Start	End	Source
FW	(Jamaica) Kameron Lacey	(United States) Lexington SC	August 23, 2024	End of season	

== Pre-season ==
The pre-season schedule was released on January 26, 2024, by SAFC.

February 17, 2024	San Antonio FC	2–3	Houston Dynamo 2	San Antonio, Texas
2:00 PM CDT	Agudelo; Lacey	Report	Goal	Stadium: Toyota Field; Attendance: Closed-Door

February 24, 2024	San Antonio FC	2–0	Antigua GFC	San Antonio, Texas
7:30 PM CDT	Haakenson 10'; Omar 57'	Report		Stadium: Toyota Field; Attendance: 4,683

March 2, 2024	San Antonio FC	2–1	Austin FC II	San Antonio, Texas
1:00 PM CDT	Silva; Agudelo	Report	(pen.)	Stadium: Toyota Field; Attendance: Closed-Door

== Competitions ==
=== Overall ===
Position in the Western Conference

Competition	Started round	Current position / round	Final position / round	First match	Last match
USL Championship Western Conference	—	—	9th	March 9, 2024	October 26, 2024
U.S. Open Cup	Round of 32	—	Round of 32	May 8, 2024	

Updated to match played October 26, 2024
Source: Competitions

=== Overview ===
Competition	Record							
Competition	G	W	D	L	GF	GA	GD	Win %
USL Championship	24	6	6	12	24	32	−8	25.00
U.S. Open Cup	1	0	0	1	0	2	−2	0.00
Total	25	6	6	13	24	34	−10	24.00

Updated to match played August 27, 2024
Source: Competitions

=== USL Championship ===
==== Conference table ====
Western Conference

Pos	Team	Pld	W	L	T	GF	GA	GD	Pts	Qualification
7	Oakland Roots SC	34	13	16	5	37	57	−20	44	Playoffs
8	Phoenix Rising FC	34	11	14	9	33	39	−6	42	Playoffs
9	San Antonio FC	34	10	15	9	36	49	−13	39	
10	FC Tulsa	34	9	14	11	33	48	−15	38	
11	Monterey Bay FC	34	8	16	10	29	44	−15	34	

Source: USL Championship Standings

==== Results summary ====
Overall								Home						Away					
Pld	W	D	L	GF	GA	GD	Pts	W	D	L	GF	GA	GD	W	D	L	GF	GA	GD
34	10	9	15	36	49	−13	39	6	6	5	22	24	−2	4	3	10	14	25	−11

Last updated: November 1, 2024.

==== Results by matchday ====
Position in the Western Conference

Round	1	2	3	4	5	6	7	8	9	10	11	12	13	14	15	16	17	18	19	20	21	22	23	24	25	26	27	28	29	30	31	32	33	34
Stadium	H	A	H	H	A	H	A	A	H	H	A	H	H	A	A	A	H	H	A	A	H	A	H	A	H									
Result	D	D	W	W	L	D	W	L	D	D	L	W	L	L	L	L	L	W	L	L	L	D	W	L										
Position	6	8	3	3	5	6	4	5	5	6	8	6	8	8	9	11	11	10	11	11	11	11	11	11										

Updated to match(es) played on August 27, 2024. Source:
A = Away; H = Home; W = Win; D = Draw; L = Loss

==== Matches ====
The 2024 schedule was released on December 18, 2023. Home team is listed first, left to right.

Win Draw Loss Postponed

Kickoff times are in CDT (UTC-05) unless shown otherwise

March 9, 2024 1	San Antonio FC	2–2	Loudoun United FC	San Antonio, Texas
7:30 p.m. CST	Silva 14', (yellow card) 76'; Agudelo 48'	Report	Ryan 18'; Erlandson (yellow card) 23'; François (red card) 29'; Leerman (yellow card) 74'; Dambrot (yellow card) 82'; Valot 90+4'; Skundrich (yellow card) 90+6'	Stadium: Toyota Field; Attendance: 7,263; Referee: Calin Radosav

March 16, 2024 2	Tampa Bay Rowdies	2–2	San Antonio FC	St. Petersburg, Florida
6:30 p.m. CST	Jennings 4', (yellow card) 16'; Lasso (yellow card) 19'; Bodily (yellow card) 28'; Crisostomo (yellow card) 45'; Arteaga 72'	Report	Hernández (yellow card) 14'; Lacey (yellow card) 66'; Sisniega (yellow card) 72'; Haakenson (yellow card) 76'; Bura 83'; Manley 90+1'	Stadium: Al Lang Stadium; Attendance: 7,500; Referee: Alexis Da Silva

March 23, 2024 3	San Antonio FC	2–0	Colorado Springs Switchbacks FC	San Antonio, Texas
7:30 p.m. CST	Taintor (yellow card) 4'; Omar (yellow card) 26'; Hernández (yellow card) 64'; Silva 75', (yellow card) 83'; Mbongue 90+1'	Report	Tejada (yellow card) 62'; Williams (yellow card) 88'; Foster (yellow card) 90+2'	Stadium: Toyota Field; Attendance: 6,138; Referee: Abdou Ndiaye

March 30, 2024 4	San Antonio FC	2–1	Monterey Bay FC	San Antonio, Texas
7:30 p.m. CDT	Manley 7'; Gomez (yellow card) 34'; Omar (yellow card) 77'; Lambert (yellow card) 82', (goal) 86'	Report	Guzmán (yellow card) 29'; Doner (yellow card) 43'; Fehr 45+3'; Baca (yellow card) 83'	Stadium: Toyota Field; Attendance: 7,546; Referee: Lorenzo Hernandez
Note: 250th USL league match

April 6, 2024 5	Las Vegas Lights FC	1–0	San Antonio FC	Las Vegas, Nevada
9:30 p.m. CST	Azcona (yellow card) 17'; Garcia (yellow card) 54'; Smart 56'	Report	Haakenson (yellow card) 38'; Silva (yellow card) 50'; Lambert (yellow card) 55'; Agudelo (yellow card) 76'; Taintor (yellow card) 77'; Lacey (yellow card) 90+6'	Stadium: Cashman Field; Attendance: 1,436; Referee: Greg Dopka

April 13, 2024 6	San Antonio FC	0–0	Orange County SC	San Antonio, Texas
7:30 p.m. CDT	Taintor (yellow card) 25'; Haakenson (yellow card) 68'	Report	Sorto (yellow card) 19'; Miles (yellow card) 79'; Amang (yellow card) 82'; Partida (yellow card) 89'; Karlsen (yellow card) 90+3'	Stadium: Toyota Field; Attendance: 6,957; Referee: Natalie Simon

April 20, 2024 7	Hartford Athletic	1–3	San Antonio FC	Hartford, Connecticut
4:00 p.m. CST	Epps 28'; Asiedu (yellow card) 41'; Hodge (yellow card) 45+3'; Burke (yellow card) 50' (yellow-red card) 90+5'; Schmidt (yellow card) 75'; Farrell (yellow card) 84'	Report	Chol 7'; Boni (yellow card) 16'; Haakenson (yellow card) 44'; Lacey (yellow card) 66'; Akpunonu (OG) 78'; Solignac 85' (pen.)	Stadium: Trinity Health Stadium; Referee: Jeremy Scheer

April 27, 2024 8	Miami FC	2–1	San Antonio FC	Miami, Florida
6:00 p.m. CST	Luis Pedro 24'; Lawrence (yellow card) 37', (goal) 45'; Gagliardi (yellow card) 74'; Ayimbila (yellow card) 89'; Gabriel de Freitas (yellow card) 90+4'	Report	Gomez (yellow card) 6'; Taintor (yellow card) 7'; Haakenson 11'; Lambert (yellow card) 90+3'	Stadium: FIU Stadium; Attendance: 1,078; Referee: Nabil Bensalah

May 4, 2024 9	San Antonio FC	2–2	Oakland Roots SC	San Antonio, Texas
7:30 p.m. CST	Chol (yellow card) 30'; Omar (yellow card) 55'; Agudelo 73'; Lambert 79', (yellow card) 82'; Sisniega (yellow card) 83'	Report	Cruz (yellow card) 42'; Chéry 65'; Reid (yellow card) 68'; Njie (yellow card) 76'; Rodriguez 84' (pen.)	Stadium: Toyota Field; Attendance: 7,437; Referee: Joshua Encarnación

May 11, 2024 10	San Antonio FC	1–1	Las Vegas Lights FC	San Antonio, Texas
7:30 p.m. CST	Burks (yellow card) 38'; Marcina (yellow card) 45'; Chol 45+2'; Hernández (yellow card) 47' (yellow-red card) 48'; Lambert (yellow card) 82'	Report	Klimenta (yellow card) 13'; Nigro (yellow card) 45'; Noël 59'	Stadium: Toyota Field; Attendance: 7,218; Referee: Elvis Osmanovic

May 25, 2024 11	New Mexico United	2–1	San Antonio FC	Albuquerque, New Mexico
8:00 p.m. CDT	Houssou 35'; Herbert (yellow card) 38'; Hurst 45+4', (yellow card) 55'; Bailey (yellow card) 61'	Report	Haakenson 21'; Bura (yellow card) 25'; Chol (yellow card) 42'; Lacey (yellow card) 45+1'; Manley (yellow card) 80' (yellow-red card) 90+5'	Stadium: Isotopes Park; Attendance: 8,539; Referee: Matthew Thompson

June 1, 2024 12	San Antonio FC	1–0	Memphis 901 FC	San Antonio, Texas
8:00 p.m. CST	Haakenson (yellow card) 16'; Agudelo 26'; Bura (yellow card) 40'; Hernández (yellow card) 56'; Gomez (yellow card) 61'; Lambert (yellow card) 90+6'	Report	Marlon (yellow card) 16'; Careaga (yellow card) 71'; Luiz Fernando (yellow card) 72'; DePuy (red card) 81'	Stadium: Toyota Field; Attendance: 6,094; Referee: Ricardo Montero

June 5, 2024 13	San Antonio FC	0–1	El Paso Locomotive FC	San Antonio, Texas
8:00 p.m. CST	Taintor (yellow card) 63'; Hernández (yellow card) 78'	Report	Rose (yellow card) 23'; Alfaro (yellow card) 30'; Craig (yellow card) 57', (goal) 65'; Zacarías (yellow card) 90+6'	Stadium: Toyota Field; Attendance: 5,805; Referee: Ricardo Fierro

June 8, 2024 14	FC Tulsa	2–1	San Antonio FC	Tulsa, Oklahoma
7:30 p.m. CST	Pacheco (yellow card) 45+3', (goal) 48', 61'; Yosef (yellow card) 51'	Report	Hernández (yellow card) 90'	Stadium: ONEOK Field; Attendance: 5,073; Referee: Brandon Stevis

June 15, 2024 15	Indy Eleven	1–0	San Antonio FC	Indianapolis, Indiana
6:00 p.m. CST	Ofeimu (yellow card) 2'; Burks 29' (o.g.); Mines (yellow card) 52'; Chapman-Page (yellow card) 79'; Blake (yellow card) 88'	Report	Hernández (penalty missed) 16'; Taintor (yellow card) 32'; Chol (yellow card) 50'; Gomez (yellow card) 54'	Stadium: Michael A. Carroll Stadium; Attendance: 10,491; Referee: Adam Kilpatrick

June 19, 2024 16	Birmingham Legion FC	3–0	San Antonio FC	Birmingham, Alabama
7:00 p.m. CST	Rufe (yellow card) 16'; Crognale 51'; Tabort Etaka 55'; Pasher 87'	Report	Gomez (yellow card) 51'; Taintor (yellow card) 65'	Stadium: Protective Stadium; Attendance: 1,996; Referee: Elvis Osmanovic

June 29, 2024 17	San Antonio FC	2–3	New Mexico United	San Antonio, Texas
8:00 p.m. CST	Bura (yellow card) 22'; Aguedlo 34', 37', (yellow card) 52'; Marcina (yellow card) 90+5'	Report	Taintor 2' (o.g.); Bailey (yellow card) 24'; Herbert (yellow card) 28'; Akale (yellow card) 36' (yellow-red card) 39'; Mohamed 44'; Hurst 51' (pen.); Hernandez (yellow card) 63'; Tabakis (yellow card) 90+5'	Stadium: Toyota Field; Attendance: 6,625; Referee: Matthew Corrigan

July 6, 2024 18	San Antonio FC	2–1	Phoenix Rising FC	San Antonio, Texas
8:00 p.m. CST	Agudelo 39', 81' (pen.); Mbongue (yellow card) 90+9'	Report	Boye (yellow card) 38'; Varela 58'; Cuello (yellow card) 90+5'	Stadium: Toyota Field; Attendance: 6,011; Referee: Greg Dopka

July 20, 2024 19	Orange County SC	2–0	San Antonio FC	Irvine, California
9:00 p.m. CST	Scott (yellow card) 29'; Nakkim 62'; Gomez (yellow card) 66'; Lambe 88'	Report	Hernández (yellow card) 44'; Buckmaster (yellow card) 52'	Stadium: Championship Soccer Stadium; Attendance: 4,258; Referee: Trevor Wiseman

July 27, 2024 20	Memphis 901 FC	1–0	San Antonio FC	Memphis, Tennessee
7:00 p.m. CST	Careaga 31'; Pickering (yellow card) 39'; Duncan (yellow card) 43'; Glass (yellow card) 69'	Report	Agudelo (yellow card) 36'; Haakenson (yellow card) 45+2'; Taintor (yellow card) 68'; Lambert (yellow card) 88'	Stadium: AutoZone Park; Attendance: 3,594; Referee: Abdou Ndiaye

August 3, 2024 21	San Antonio FC	1–3	FC Tulsa	San Antonio, Texas
8:00 p.m. CST	Solignac 15'; Marcina (yellow card) 45+5'; Hernández (yellow card) 68'; Lambert (yellow card) 89'	Report	Booth (yellow card) 36'; Goodrum 42'; Laszo (yellow card) 45+6', (goal) 49'; Stojanovic 82'	Stadium: Toyota Field; Attendance: 5,535; Referee: John Griggs

August 10, 2024 22	Pittsburgh Riverhounds SC	0–0	San Antonio FC	Pittsburgh, Pennsylvania
6:00 p.m. CST	Wälti (yellow card) 7'; Etou (yellow card) 90'+9'	Report	Marcina (yellow card) 45+3'; Mbongue (yellow card) 90'+2'	Stadium: Highmark Stadium; Attendance: 5,388; Referee: Alyssa Nichols

August 17, 2024 23	San Antonio FC	1–0	North Carolina FC	San Antonio, Texas
8:00 p.m. CST	Hernández (yellow card) 50'; Brigido 79'	Report	Craig (yellow card) 17'; Anderson (yellow card) 51'; Maldonado (yellow card) 69'	Stadium: Toyota Field; Attendance: 6,729; Referee: Adam Kilpatrick

August 24, 2024 24	Sacramento Republic FC	1–0	San Antonio FC	Sacramento, California
10:00 p.m. CST	Portillo (yellow card) 45+1'; Timmer (yellow card) 69'; Cicerone 86' (pen.), (yellow card) 90+2'; Ross (yellow card) 90'	Report	Haakenson (yellow card) 83'; Manley (yellow card) 85'; Hernández (yellow card) 90+2'	Stadium: Heart Health Park; Attendance: 11,569; Referee: Nabil Bensalah

August 31, 2024 25	San Antonio FC	1–1	Charleston Battery	San Antonio, Texas
8:00 p.m. CST	Nogueira (yellow card) 7'; Taintor (yellow card) 19'; Hernandez 51' (yellow card) 90'+5'; Blanco (yellow card) 83'; Gomez (yellow card) 90'+7'; Solignac (yellow card) 90'+9'; Gongora (yellow card) 90'+10'	Report	Dossantos (yellow card) 2'; Archer (yellow card) 28'; Rodríguez (yellow card) 62'; Torres 84'	Stadium: Toyota Field; Attendance: 6,367; Referee: Muhammad Hassan

September 7, 2024 26	Monterey Bay FC	0–1	San Antonio FC	Seaside, California
8:00 p.m. CST	Martinez (yellow card) 16'; Greene (yellow card) 90'+7'	Report	Solignac 57' (pen.); Manley (yellow card) 64'; Mbongue (yellow card) 90'+10'	Stadium: Cardinale Stadium; Attendance: 3,827; Referee: Elijio Arreguin

September 14, 2024 27	Oakland Roots SC	0-1	San Antonio FC	Hayward, California
8:00 p.m. CST	Riley (yellow card) 45'+2' (yellow-red card) 45'+5'; Logue (yellow card) 48'; Njie (yellow card) 62'; Reid (yellow card) 79'; Baca (yellow card) 89'	Report	Solignac 4' (yellow card) 44'; Haakenson (yellow card) 45'+5'; Sánchez (yellow card) 59'; Agudelo (yellow card) 63'; Grey (yellow card) 65'	Stadium: Pioneer Stadium; Attendance: 3,841; Referee: Ricardo Montero

September 21, 2024 28	Phoenix Rising FC	4-0	San Antonio FC	Phoenix, Arizona
6:30 p.m. CST	Boye 27'; Formella 40'; Dennis 40'; Novo (yellow card) 79'; John 84'; Wyke (yellow card) 89'	Report	Hernandez (yellow card) 68'; Taintor (yellow card) 79'; Blanco (yellow card) 90+3'	Stadium: Phoenix Rising Soccer Stadium; Attendance: 4,844; Referee: Gerald Flores

September 28, 2024 29	San Antonio FC	1-3	Rhode Island FC	San Antonio, TX
8:30 p.m. CST	Agudelo 20'; Burá (yellow card) 44'; Lambert (yellow card) 79'; Gomez (yellow card) 86'; Solignac (yellow card) 86'	Report	Dikwa 1' (yellow card) 62'; Herivaux (yellow card) 17'; Holstad (yellow card) 25' (goal) 51'; Nodarse (yellow card) 43'; Fuson (yellow card) 45' (yellow-red card) 85'; Brito 83'; Stoneman (yellow card) 86'; Kwizera (yellow card) 90+2'	Stadium: Toyota Field; Attendance: 6,620; Referee: Sergii Demianchuk

October 5 30	San Antonio FC	2-1	Sacramento Republic FC	San Antonio, Texas
7:30 p.m. CST	Manley 49'; Blanco (yellow card) 78'; Timmer 84' (o.g.)	Report	Phillips 4'; Parano (yellow card) 12'; Timmer (yellow card) 22'; Amann (yellow card) 68'	Stadium: Toyota Field; Attendance: 6,875; Referee: Elvis Osmanovic

October 9, 2024 31	El Paso Locomotive FC	2-2	San Antonio FC	El Paso, Texas
6:30 p.m. CST	Coronado (yellow card) 65'; Burks 83' (o.g.); Lyons 88'	Report	Hernandez (yellow card) 16'; LaCava 53'; Solignac 63'; Taintor (yellow card) 67'; Djeffal (yellow card) 77'; Lambert (yellow card) 90'+3'	Stadium: Southwest University Park; Attendance: 6,004; Referee: Servando Berna Rico

October 12 32	Colorado Springs Switchbacks FC	1-2	San Antonio FC	Colorado Springs, Colorado
6:00 p.m. CST	Hanya (yellow card) 22'; Huerman (yellow card) 25'; Rocha 68'; Mahoney (yellow card) 78'	Report	Manley (yellow card) 44'; Mbongue 77'; Sisniega (yellow card) 90'+7'; Buckmaster (yellow card) 90'+7'; Solignac 90'+9'	Stadium: Weidner Field; Attendance: 8,023; Referee: Calin Radosav

October 19 33	San Antonio FC	1-1	Louisville City	San Antonio, Texas
7:30 p.m. CST	Haakenson (yellow card) 34'; Hernandez (yellow card) 61'; Lambert 61'; Marcina (yellow card) 62'; Djeffal (yellow card) 64'	Report	Totsh (yellow card) 3'; Goodrum 45+2'; McFadden (yellow card) 90+4'	Stadium: Toyota Field; Attendance: 7,199; Referee: Abdou Ndiaye; Assistant referees: Clarence Clark; Joseph Jeffers; Fourth official: Collins Gitau

October 26 34	San Antonio FC	1-4	Detroit City FC	San Antonio, Texas
7:30 p.m. CST	Burks (yellow card) 27'; Manley (red card) 45+1'; Gomez (yellow card) 45+4'; Mbongue 57'; Haakenson (yellow card) 76'	Report	Rodriguez 28'; Ry. Williams 45+3'; Morris 54' 65'; Amoo-Mensah (yellow card) 71'	Stadium: Toyota Field; Attendance: 7,066; Referee: John Griggs

=== Lamar Hunt U.S. Open Cup ===
May 8, 2024 Round of 32	Indy Eleven (Indiana)	2–0	(Texas) San Antonio FC	Indianapolis, Indiana
6:00 p.m. CDT	Williams 2'; Blake 10'; Guenzatti (yellow card) 58'	Report	Hernández (yellow card) 20'; Chol (yellow card) 41'; Burks (yellow card) 66'; Lacey (yellow card) 69'	Stadium: Bud and Jackie Sellick Bowl; Referee: Kyle Johnston

=== Exhibition ===
On June 12, 2024, it was announced that San Antonio would host Liga Promerica side Deportivo Saprissa for an international friendly.

July 13, 2024 Friendly	San Antonio FC (United States)	2–4	(Costa Rica) Deportivo Saprissa	San Antonio, Texas
8:00 p.m. CDT	Mbongue 14'; Boni (yellow card) 17'; Fuertes 65'	Report	Segura 21'; Guzmán 68'; Torres 73'; Rodríguez 80'	Stadium: Toyota Field; Attendance: 5,535

== Statistics ==
=== Appearances ===
Discipline includes league, playoffs, and Open Cup play.

No.	Pos.	Name	League		Playoffs		U.S. Open Cup		Total		Discipline	
No.	Pos.	Name	Apps	Goals	Apps	Goals	Apps	Goals	Apps	Goals	Yellow card	Red card
1	GK	(Mexico) Pablo Sisniega	15	0	0	0	0	0	15	0	2	0
2	DF	(United States) Carter Manley	11	1	0	0	0	0	11	2	1	0
3	DF	(United States) Mitchell Taintor	20	0	0	0	0	0	20	0	7	0
4	DF	(El Salvador) Nelson Blanco	10	0	0	0	0	0	10	0	0	0
5	DF	(United States) Kendall Burks	24	0	0	0	1	0	25	0	2	0
6	MF	(Somalia) Mohamed Omar	4 (3)	0	0	0	1	0	5 (3)	0	3	0
7	MF	(United States) Luke Haakenson	21 (2)	2	0	0	0	0	21 (2)	2	7	0
8	MF	(United States) Sofiane Djeffal	1 (2)	0	0	0	0	0	1 (2)	0	0	0
9	FW	(United States) Jake LaCava	9 (1)	0	0	0	0	0	9 (1)	0	0	0
10	MF	(Mexico) Jorge Hernández	22	1	0	0	1	0	23	1	9	0
11	FW	(Jamaica) Kameron Lacey	8 (8)	0	0	0	1	0	9 (8)	0	5	0
12	DF	(Brazil) Lucas Silva	9	2	0	0	0	0	9	2	3	0
13	MF	(Guinea-Bissau) Bura Nogueira	9 (4)	1	0	0	0 (1)	0	9 (5)	1	3	0
17	FW	(United States) Juan Agudelo	21	7	0	0	1	0	22	7	3	0
18	FW	(Canada) Hugo Mbongue	4 (9)	1	0	0	0	0	4 (9)	1	2	0
19	FW	(Argentina) Luis Solignac	4 (3)	2	0	0	0	0	4 (3)	2	0	0
21	GK	(United States) Kendall McIntosh	9	0	0	0	1	0	10	0	0	0
22	DF	(Trinidad and Tobago) Shannon Gomez	14 (7)	0	0	0	1	0	15 (7)	0	5	0
23	DF	(United States) Rece Buckmaster	2 (1)	0	0	0	0	0	2 (1)	0	1	0
27	MF	(Jamaica) Kevon Lambert	17	2	0	0	1	0	18	2	8	0
40	DF	(Austria) Richard Windbichler	3 (1)	0	0	0	1	0	4 (1)	0	0	0
41	FW	(United States) Jake Salas	0	0	0	0	0	0	0	0	0	0
42	MF	(United States) Andy Bacho	0	0	0	0	0	0	0	0	0	0
43	MF	(United States) Landry Walker	0 (1)	0	0	0	0	0	0 (1)	0	0	0
44	MF	(United States) Dalziel Ozuna	0	0	0	0	0	0	0	0	0	0
46	FW	(United States) Eduardo Fernandez	0 (2)	0	0	0	0 (1)	0	0 (3)	0	0	0
47	FW	(United States) Izaiah Garza	1 (2)	0	0	0	0 (1)	0	1 (3)	0	0	0
48	DF	(United States) Giovanni Padilla	0 (2)	0	0	0	0 (1)	0	0 (3)	0	0	0
49	MF	(United States) Adrian Valencia	0	0	0	0	0	0	0	0	0	0
50	GK	(United States) Brandon Gongora	0	0	0	0	0	0	0	0	0	0
59	MF	(Mexico) Jesús Brígido	1 (1)	1	0	0	0	0	1 (1)	1	0	0
66	DF	(Burkina Faso) Trova Boni	7 (3)	0	0	0	1	0	8 (3)	0	1	0
80	FW	(South Sudan) Machop Chol	11 (6)	2	0	0	1	0	12 (6)	2	4	0
Players who left the club
	MF	(Ghana) Mohammed Abu	2 (1)	0	0	0	0	0	2 (1)	0	0	0
	FW	(Colombia) José Mulato	1 (7)	0	0	0	0 (1)	0	1 (8)	0	0	0
	FW	(Colombia) Santiago Patiño	0	0	0	0	0	0	0	0	0	0

Last updated: August 27, 2024.
Source: San Antonio FC

=== Top scorers ===
The list is sorted by shirt number when total goals are equal.

Rnk	Pos	No.	Player	League	Playoffs	U.S. Open Cup	Total
1	FW	17	(United States) Juan Agudelo	7	0	0	7
2	DF	2	(United States) Carter Manley	2	0	0	2
2	MF	7	(United States) Luke Haakenson	2	0	0	2
2	DF	12	(Brazil) Lucas Silva	2	0	0	2
2	FW	19	(Argentina) Luis Solignac	2	0	0	2
2	MF	27	(Jamaica) Kevon Lambert	2	0	0	2
2	FW	80	(South Sudan) Machop Chol	2	0	0	2
8	MF	10	(Mexico) Jorge Hernández	1	0	0	1
8	MF	13	(Guinea-Bissau) Bura Nogueira	1	0	0	1
8	FW	18	(Canada) Hugo Mbongue	1	0	0	1
8	MF	59	(Mexico) Jesús Brígido	1	0	0	1
8	FW	80	(South Sudan) Machop Chol	1	0	0	1
#	Own goals			1	0	0	1
TOTALS				24	0	0	24

Last updated: August 27, 2024.
Source: San Antonio FC

=== Clean sheets ===
The list is sorted by shirt number when total clean sheets are equal.

Rnk	No.	Player	League	Playoffs	U.S. Open Cup	Total
1	1	(Mexico) Pablo Sisniega	4	0	0	4
2	21	(United States) Kendall McIntosh	1	0	0	1
TOTALS			5	0	0	5

Last updated: August 27, 2024.
Source: San Antonio FC

=== Summary ===
Games played	25 (24 USL Championship) (1 U.S. Open Cup)
Games won	6 (6 USL Championship) (0 U.S. Open Cup)
Games drawn	6 (6 USL Championship) (0 U.S. Open Cup)
Games lost	13 (12 USL Championship) (1 U.S. Open Cup)
Goals scored	24 (24 USL Championship) (0 U.S. Open Cup)
Goals conceded	34 (32 USL Championship) (2 U.S. Open Cup)
Goal difference	-10 (-8 USL Championship) (-2 U.S. Open Cup)
Clean sheets	5 (5 USL Championship) (0 U.S. Open Cup)
Yellow cards	68 (64 USL Championship) (4 U.S. Open Cup)
Red cards	2 (2 USL Championship) (0 U.S. Open Cup)
Most appearances	(United States) Kendall Burks (25 appearances)
Top scorer	(United States) Juan Agudelo (7 goals)
Winning Percentage	Overall: 6/25 (24.00%)

Last updated: August 27, 2024.
Source: San Antonio FC

== Awards ==
=== Player ===
No.	Player	Award	Week/Month	Source
10	(United States) Jorge Hernández	Championship Team of the Week	Week 1	
12	(Brazil) Lucas Silva	Championship Team of the Week	Week 3	
HC	(Canada) Alen Marcina	Championship Coach of the Week	Week 3	
3	(United States) Mitchell Taintor	Championship Team of the Week	Week 4	
2	(United States) Carter Manley	Championship Goal of the Week	Week 4	
10	(United States) Jorge Hernández	Championship Team of the Week	Week 7	
10	(United States) Jorge Hernández	Championship Team of the Week	Week 9	
10	(United States) Jorge Hernández	Championship Team of the Week	Week 14	
10	(United States) Jorge Hernández	Championship Goal of the Week	Week 14	
5	(United States) Kendall Burks	Midseason Defender of the Year	July	
