= 2025 Lexington SC season =

2025 Soccer club season

Lexington SC
2025 season
- Owners: Bill and Donna Shively Stephen Dawahare
- Head coach: Terry Boss
- Stadium: Lexington SC Stadium; Lexington, Kentucky
- USLC: Western Conference: 9th Overall: 17th
- USLC Playoffs: DNQ
- U.S. Open Cup: Second Round
- USL Jägermeister Cup: Group stage
Home colours	Away colours

The 2025 Lexington SC season was the club's third season since their establishment on October 5, 2021. The club competed in their first season in the USL Championship, the second tier of American soccer, after being promoted from the USL League One following the completion of their own soccer-specific stadium, Lexington SC Stadium.

== Staff ==
Position	Name
Head coach	(United States) Terry Boss
Assistant coach	(United States) Kyle Timm
Assistant coach	(United States) Jose Robles
Director of Goalkeeping	(United States) Nate Walzer
Head of Performance	(Malta) Nigel McCarthy
Director of Soccer Operations	(United States) Nick Gettelfinger
Equipment Manager	(United States) Kaleb Aleman
Head Athletic Trainer	(United States) Taylor Spyker

== Season squad ==
Squad No.	Name	Nationality	Date of birth (age)
Goalkeepers
1	Logan Ketterer	(United States)	November 9, 1993 (age 31)
31	Brooks Thompson	(United States)	May 28, 2002 (age 23)
Defenders
2	Kimball Jackson	(United States)	August 2, 2004 (age 20)
4	Lucas Stauffer	(United States)	April 21, 1995 (age 29)
5	Kendall Burks	(United States)	October 8, 1999 (age 25)
6	Joe Hafferty	(United States)	March 21, 1998 (age 27)
12	Xavier Zengue	(United States)	Mar 21, 2001 (age 24)
14	Danny Barbir	(United States)	January 31, 1998 (age 27)
15	Daniel Wu	(United States)	November 2, 2000 (age 24)
19	Josh Ramsey	(United States)	August 22, 2002 (age 22)
22	Jacob Greene	(United States)	March 23, 2003 (age 22)
24	Kieran Sargeant	(United States)	May 15, 2003 (age 21)
27	Gaël Gibert	(France)	Jul 31, 2000 (age 24)
Forwards
7	Dylan Borczak	(United States)	June 13, 1999 (age 25)
9	Azaad Liadi	(United States)	May 14, 1998 (age 27)
11	Marcus Epps	(United States)	January 16, 1995 (age 30)
13	Christian Volesky	(United States)	September 15, 1992 (age 32)
17	Cameron Lancaster (C)	(England)	November 5, 1992 (age 31)
18	Malik Henry-Scott	(United States)	November 28, 2001 (age 23)
20	Milo Yosef	(Germany)	September 11, 1998 (age 26)
32	Ates Diouf	(Senegal)	March 24, 2000 (age 25)
33	Forster Ajago	(Ghana)	August 16, 2001 (age 23)
72	Braudílio Rodrigues	(Portugal)	November 15, 1999 (age 25)
77	Nico Brown	(United States)	August 11, 1998 (age 26)
83	Hugo Mbongue	(Canada)	July 27, 2004 (age 20)
99	Cory Burke	(Jamaica)	December 28, 1991 (age 33)
Midfielders
3	Sofiane Djeffal	(France)	April 19, 1999 (age 26)
8	Nicolas Firmino	(Brazil)	January 30, 2001 (age 24)
10	Yannick Yankam	(Malta)	December 12, 1997 (age 27)
16	Edrey Cáceres	(El Salvador)	May 29, 2001 (age 24)
23	Alfredo Midence	(Honduras)	June 29, 2002 (age 22)
37	Eliot Goldthorp	(England)	November 3, 2001 (age 23)
71	Michael Adedokun	(Nigeria)	May 27, 2001 (age 24)
80	Devon Williams	(Jamaica)	April 8, 1992 (age 33)

Last updated: June 3, 2025.
Source: Lexington SC

== Competitions ==
=== USL Championship ===
==== Standings ====
Pos	Team	Pld	W	L	T	GF	GA	GD	Pts	Qualification
7	Orange County SC	30	10	11	9	44	45	−1	39	Playoffs
8	Colorado Springs Switchbacks FC	30	10	13	7	35	47	−12	37	Playoffs
9	Lexington SC	30	9	12	9	31	42	−11	36	
10	Oakland Roots SC	30	8	14	8	42	52	−10	32	
11	Monterey Bay FC	30	7	15	8	27	45	−18	29	

Source: USL Championship Standings
Rules for classification: 1) head-to-head points; 2) head-to-head goal differential; 3) points-per-game within conference; 4) total wins; 5) total goal differential; 6) total goals scored; 7) points earned against top four Conference finishers; 8) disciplinary points; 9) coin toss or drawing of lots

==== Matches ====
On December 19, 2024, the USL Championship released the regular season schedule for all 24 teams.

All times are in Eastern Standard Time.

===== March =====
March 8 1	Lexington SC	2–0	Hartford Athletic	Lexington, Kentucky
7:00 PM	Hafferty 10'; Goldthorp 80'	Report	Ngnepi (yellow card) 73'; Hairston (yellow card) 81'; Samadia (red card) 90+3'	Stadium: Lexington SC Stadium; Attendance: 5,025; Referee: Nabil Bensalah

March 15 2	Orange County SC	2–2	Lexington SC	Irvine, California
10:30	Doody 9'; War 90+7'	Report	Rodrigues 45+1'; Epps 53'; Williams (yellow card) 75'; Djeffal (yellow card) 77'; Ketterer (yellow card) 80'	Stadium: Championship Soccer Stadium; Attendance: 4,550

March 22 3	Lexington SC	1–1	Indy Eleven	Lexington, Kentucky
7:00 PM	Beer (yellow card) 28'; Djeffal (yellow card) 36'; Burks (yellow card) 62'; Epps 79'; Sargeant (yellow card) 90+5'	Report	Kizza (yellow card) 24'; Musa (yellow card) 45+1'; Rendón 60'	Stadium: Lexington SC Stadium; Attendance: 4,299; Referee: Luis Arroyo

March 29 4	Lexington SC	2–3	San Antonio FC	Lexington, Kentucky
7:00 PM	Firmino 11' (yellow card) 19'; Burke 16'; Sargeant (yellow card) 26'; Djeffal (yellow card) 72'	Report	Medranda 23'; Hernandez 27'; LaCava 82' (yellow card) 90+2'	Stadium: Lexington SC Stadium; Attendance: 4,437; Referee: John Matto

===== April =====
April 5 5	El Paso Locomotive FC	2–1	Lexington SC	El Paso, Texas
9:00 PM	Ortiz 22' (yellow card) 64'; Cabrera 41'; Moreno (yellow card) 45+1'; Ackwei (yellow card) 45+3'; Calvillo (yellow card) 54'	Report	Djeffal (yellow card) 25'; Firmino (yellow card) 54'; Rodrigues (yellow card) 59'; Burke 68' (yellow card) 90'	Stadium: Southwest University Park; Attendance: 4,180; Referee: Igor Bych

April 12 6	Lexington SC	0–0	Las Vegas Lights FC	Lexington, Kentucky
7:00 PM		Report	Singer (yellow card) 62'; Nigro (yellow card) 65'	Stadium: Lexington SC Stadium; Attendance: 3,337; Referee: Calin Radosav

April 19 7	Lexington SC	0–0	Monterey Bay FC	Lexington, Kentucky
7:00 PM	Burks (yellow card) 45+2'; Williams (yellow card) 56'	Report		Stadium: Lexington SC Stadium; Attendance: 3,102; Referee: Thomas Snyder

===== May =====
May 1 8	Louisville City FC	2–0	Lexington SC	Louisville, Kentucky
8:00 PM	Adams (yellow card) 50'; McFadden (yellow card) 52'; Gibert 67' (o.g.); Goodrum 81'	Report	Ajago (red card) 50'; Sargeant (yellow card) 55'	Stadium: Lynn Family Stadium; Attendance: 8,233; Referee: Jeremy Scheer

May 10 9	Loudoun United FC	5–1	Lexington SC	Leesburg, Virginia
6:00 PM	Mines (yellow card) 25'; Valot 26'; Tingey 48' (pen.); Aboukoura 59'; Awuah 76'; Ryan 87'	Report	Epps 17'; Adedokun (yellow card) 42' (red card) 56'	Stadium: Segra Field; Attendance: 2,400; Referee: Servando Berna Rico

May 18 10	Lexington SC	0–2	FC Tulsa	Lexington, Kentucky
7:00 PM	Hafferty (yellow card) 55'; Greene (yellow card) 69'; Lancaster (yellow card) 73'; Ketterer (yellow card) 90+6'	Report	Pierre (yellow card) 29'; Calheira 42' (pen.); Colli (yellow card) 89'; Batista 90+5'	Stadium: Lexington SC Stadium; Attendance: 3,503; Referee: Abdou Ndiaye

May 24 11	Lexington SC	1–1	Tampa Bay Rowdies	Lexington, Kentucky
7:00 PM	Ajago 31'; Greene (yellow card) 35'; Burks (yellow card) 71'	Report	Arteaga 62'	Stadium: Lexington SC Stadium; Attendance: 4,533; Referee: Matthew Corrigan

===== June =====
June 7 12	Monterey Bay FC	2−1	Lexington SC	Seaside, California
7:00 PM	Larsson 20'; Søjberg 75' (pen.)	Report	Firmino 7' (pen.)	Stadium: Cardinale Stadium; Attendance: 2,420; Referee: Mark Verso

June 14 13	Lexington SC	2−1	New Mexico United	Lexington, Kentucky
7:00 PM	Djeffal 66'; Zengue 73'	Report	Fernando 45'+6'	Stadium: Lexington SC Stadium; Attendance: 3,471; Referee: Matthew Thompson

June 20 14	Lexington SC	2−1	Colorado Springs Switchbacks FC	Lexington, Kentucky
7:00 PM	Ajago 13'; Clegg 57' (o.g.)	Report	Mahoney 74'	Stadium: Lexington SC Stadium; Attendance: 6,012; Referee: Alex Billeter

===== July =====
July 4 15	Phoenix Rising FC	0–1	Lexington SC	Phoenix, Arizona
7:00 PM		Report	Adedokun 34'	Stadium: Phoenix Rising Soccer Stadium; Attendance: 4,814; Referee: Elton García

July 12 16	Miami FC	1–1	Lexington SC	Miami, Florida
10:30 PM	Bonfiglio 24'	Report	Burke 90'+3'	Stadium: Pitbull Stadium; Attendance: 1,014; Referee: Elvis Osmanovic

July 19 17	Sacramento Republic FC	0–0	Lexington SC	Sacramento, California
11:00 PM		Report	Wu (yellow card) 22' (yellow-red card) 37'	Stadium: Heart Health Park; Attendance: 9,880; Referee: Joseph Dickerson

===== August =====
August 1 18	Colorado Springs Switchbacks FC	3–1	Lexington SC	Colorado Springs, Colorado
9:00 PM	Mahoney 40', 79'; Huerman 30'	Report	Midence 77'	Stadium: Weidner Field; Attendance: 7,349; Referee: Mark Verso

August 9 19	Lexington SC	2–0	Phoenix Rising FC	Lexington, Kentucky
6:00 PM	Ajago 29'; Adedokun 79'	Report		Stadium: Lexington SC Stadium; Attendance: 4,233; Referee: Alyssa Pennington

August 16 20	San Antonio FC	0–1	Lexington SC	San Antonio, Texas
9:00 PM	Hernandez (red card) 90'+3'	Report	Hernandez 9' (o.g.)	Stadium: Toyota Field; Attendance: 6,767; Referee: Calin Radosav

August 23 21	Lexington SC	2–1	Oakland Roots SC	Lexington, Kentucky
7:00 PM	Burke 82'; Hafferty 90'+2'	Report	Wilson 6'	Stadium: Lexington SC Stadium; Attendance: 4,508; Referee: Joshua Encarnación

August 30 22	Las Vegas Lights FC	1–0	Lexington SC	Las Vegas, Nevada
10:30 PM	Thompson 17' (o.g.)	Report		Stadium: Cashman Field; Attendance: 2,245; Referee: Brandon Stevis

===== September =====
September 5 23	Lexington SC	2–1	North Carolina FC	Lexington, Kentucky
7:00 PM	Ajago 45'+2'; Firmino 72'	Report	da Costa 87'	Stadium: Lexington SC Stadium; Attendance: 4,233; Referee: Atahan Yaya

September 12 24	Lexington SC	1–1	Orange County SC	Lexington, Kentucky
6:00 PM	Ajago 58'	Report	Jamison 45'+3'	Stadium: Lexington SC Stadium; Attendance: 3,503; Referee: Elijio Arreguin

September 20 25	Detroit City FC	0–1	Lexington SC	Hamtramck, Michigan
7:00 PM		Report	Ajago 74'	Stadium: Keyworth Stadium; Attendance: 6,123; Referee: Muhammad Hassan

September 28 26	New Mexico United	2–1	Lexington SC	Las Vegas, Nevada
6:00 PM	Vargas 7'; Maples 10' (pen.)	Report	Wu (red card) 38'; Epps 64'	Stadium: Cashman Field; Attendance: 8,439; Referee: Rodrigo Albuquerque

===== October =====
October 4 27	FC Tulsa	3–0	Lexington SC	Tulsa, Oklahoma
8:00 PM	Webber 40', 88'; Colli 65'	Report	Ketterer (red card) 37'	Stadium: ONEOK Field; Attendance: 3,199; Referee: Brad Jensen

October 11 28	Lexington SC	1–2	El Paso Locomotive FC	Lexington, Kentucky
7:00 PM	Burke 55'	Report	Diaz 9'; Avila 31'	Stadium: Lexington SC Stadium; Attendance: 4,434; Referee: Edson Carvajal

October 17 29	Lexington SC	2–2	Sacramento Republic FC	Lexington, Kentucky
7:00 PM	Burke 4'; Epps 64'	Report	Parano 85'; Herrera 90'+4'	Stadium: Lexington SC Stadium; Attendance: 5,105; Referee: Thomas Snyder

October 25 30	Oakland Roots SC	3–0	Lexington SC	Oakland, California
10:00 PM	Wilson 19'; Prentice 82'; Bettache 89'	Report		Stadium: Oakland Coliseum; Attendance: 12,079; Referee: Greg Dopka

=== USL Jägermeister Cup ===
Lexington participated in the second edition of the USL Cup, the first edition to feature teams from both the USL Championship and League One.

==== Group stage standings ====
Pos	Lg	Team	Pld	W	PKW	PKL	L	GF	GA	GD	Pts
2	USL1	Charlotte Independence	4	2	1	1	0	8	4	+4	9
3	USLC	Louisville City FC	4	3	0	0	1	8	4	+4	9
4	USLC	Lexington SC	4	1	0	1	2	6	5	+1	4
5	USLC	North Carolina FC	4	1	1	0	2	3	4	−1	5
6	USL1	Richmond Kickers	4	0	0	0	4	1	11	−10	0

Updated to match(es) played on July 26, 2025. Source: USL

==== Group matches ====
April 26, 2025	Lexington SC	0–1	Loudoun United FC	Lexington, Kentucky
6:00 PM EDT	Adedokun (yellow card) 22'; Hafferty (yellow card) 73'	Report	McCabe (yellow card) 65'; Erlandson 90+6'	Stadium: Lexington SC Stadium; Attendance: 3,417; Referee: Alyssa Nichols

May 31, 2025	Charlotte Independence	2–2 (4–2 p)	Lexington SC	Charlotte, North Carolina
7:00 PM EDT	Sorenson (yellow card) 29'; Ciss (yellow card) 35'; Romero (yellow card) 45+2'; Chaney 55' 90+3'; Spielman (yellow card) 90'	Report	Adedokun 18'; Hafferty (yellow card) 23'; Burke 50' (yellow card) 54'; Firmino (red card) 82'; Epps (yellow card) 90+2'	Stadium: American Legion Memorial Stadium; Attendance: 1,809; Referee: Gerald Flores
	Penalties
	Chaney (penalty missed); Spielman (penalty scored); Álvarez (penalty scored); Moreno (penalty scored); Bakero (penalty scored)		(penalty missed) Goldthorp; (penalty scored) Mbongue; (penalty scored) Gibert; (penalty missed) Epps

June 28, 2025	Richmond Kickers	0–3	Lexington SC	Richmond, Virginia
7:00 PM EDT		Report	Ajago 10'; Epps 31'; Burke 90'	Stadium: City Stadium; Attendance: 3,290; Referee: John Griggs

July 26, 2025	Lexington SC	1−2	Louisville City FC	Lexington, Kentucky
7:00 PM EDT		Report		Stadium: Lexington SC Stadium; Attendance: 8,252; Referee: Corbyn May

=== U.S. Open Cup ===
Lexington played in the 110th edition of the U.S. Open Cup. Entering the tournament in the first round alongside half the teams in the USL Championship, the club was drawn as hosts against amateur club Southern Indiana FC of the UPSL. After thrashing the visitors 5–0, the club was scheduled to play away against MLS Next Pro club Columbus Crew 2, academy club of MLS club Columbus Crew who deferred from participating. Away from home, Lexington lost 3–0 to the third division club.

March 19 First Round	Lexington SC (USLC) (Kentucky)	5–0	(Indiana) Southern Indiana FC (UPSL)	Lexington, Kentucky
7:30 PM EDT	Burke 13'; Goldthorp (yellow card) 25' (goal) 42'; Midence 46'; Stauffer 53'; Barbir (yellow card) 67'; Gibert (yellow card) 78'; Rodrigues 80'	Report		Stadium: Lexington SC Stadium; Attendance: 1,835; Referee: Rogelio Alvarez

April 1 Second Round	Columbus Crew 2 (MLSNP) (Ohio)	3–0	(Kentucky) Lexington SC (USLC)	Columbus, Ohio
6:00 PM EDT	Presthus 7'; Ortiz 65'; Pruter (yellow card) 75'; Adu-Gyamfi 90+4'	Report	Goldthorp (yellow card) 88'	Stadium: Lower.com Field; Attendance: 378; Referee: Salvador Flores
