= Mbongue =

Mbongue is a surname of African origin. Notable people with the surname include:

- Hugo Mbongue (born 2004), Canadian soccer player
- Ralph-William Johnson Priso-Mbongue (born 2002), Canadian soccer player
