= Kosuke Kimura =

Japanese footballer

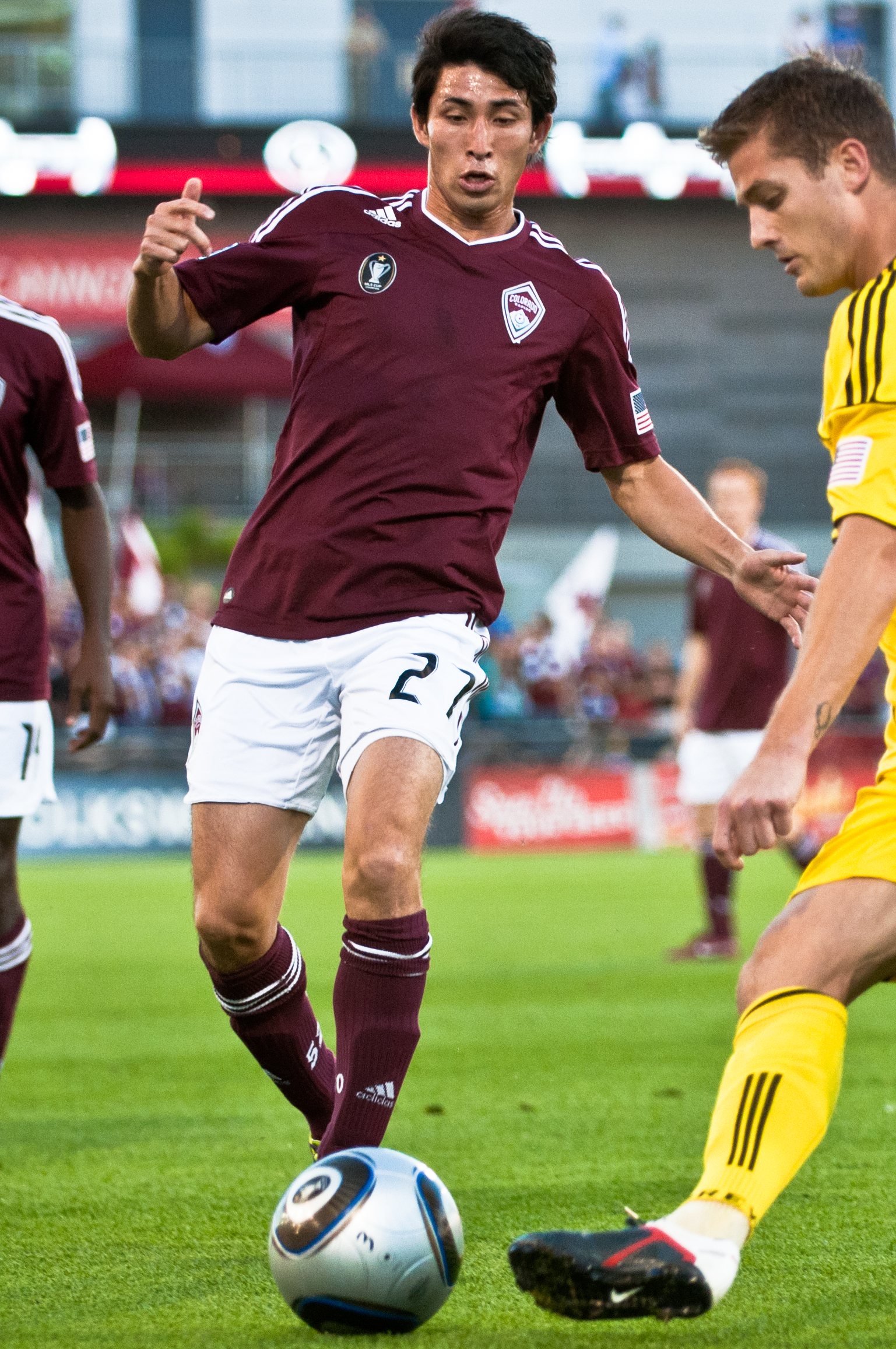
- Kimura playing with the Colorado Rapids (MLS) 2011

Personal information
- Date of birth: 14 May 1984 (age 42)
- Place of birth: Kobe, Japan
- Height: 1.75 m (5 ft 9 in)
- Position: Defender

Team information
- Current team: Lexington SC (head coach)

Youth career
- 1998–2002: Kawasaki Frontale

College career
Years	Team	Apps	(Gls)
2003–2006	Western Illinois Leathernecks		

Senior career*
Years	Team	Apps	(Gls)
2004	Thunder Bay Chill	13	(0)
2007–2012	Colorado Rapids	117	(4)
2012	Portland Timbers	17	(1)
2013–2014	New York Red Bulls	37	(0)
2015	Widzew Łódź	12	(0)
2015	Atlanta Silverbacks	19	(0)
2016	Rayo OKC	33	(0)
2017	Tulsa Roughnecks	24	(0)
2018–2019	Nashville SC	47	(1)

Managerial career
- 2022–2024: Nashville SC (assistant)
- 2025: Lexington SC (assistant)
- 2025–: Lexington SC (head coach)
- * Club domestic league appearances and goals

Kosuke Kimura (木村光佑, Kimura Kōsuke) (born 14 May 1984) is a Japanese former professional footballer and coach. He is currently the head coach for Lexington SC of the USL Super League.

A long-time veteran of Major League Soccer, he has also played in Poland. He was the first player in MLS history who was born in Japan.

== Career ==
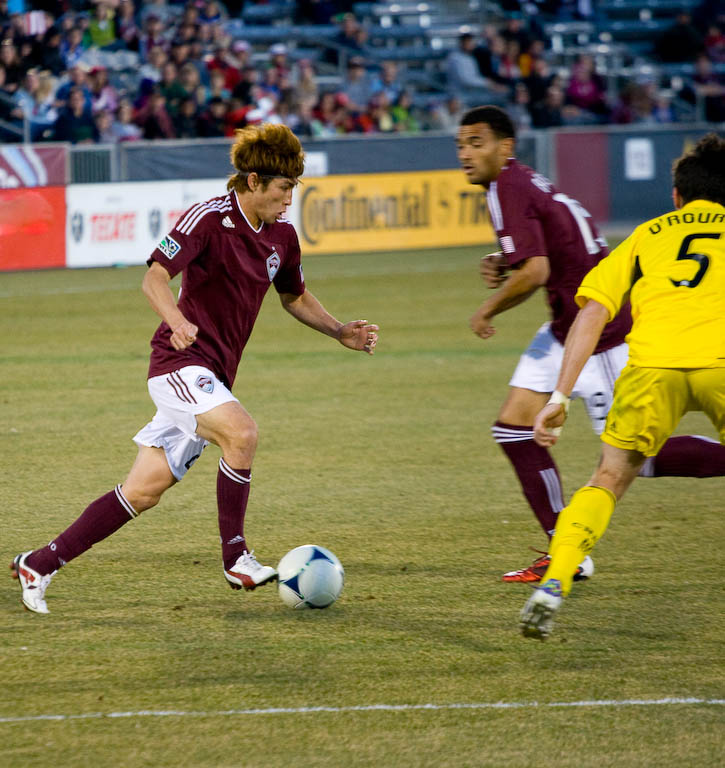
Kimura with Colorado Rapids in 2012

=== College and amateur ===
Kimura's career in organized soccer began with the youth team of Kawasaki Frontale. By the age of 15, he played for the Kawasaki Frontale reserve team. A foot injury aged 17 hampered his opportunity to sign a professional contract with the club. Despite this, he would eventually earn an athletic scholarship to play college soccer at Western Illinois University after moving to the United States, where he took an intensive English-language course and the SAT, on which he achieved a near-perfect score on its mathematics section. A four-year letterman with the Leathernecks from 2003 to 2006, he also played with the Thunder Bay Chill of the USL Premier Development League.

=== Professional ===
Kimura was drafted by Colorado Rapids in the 2007 MLS Supplemental Draft, and in doing so became first Japanese-born player in the history of Major League Soccer. He was a bit-part player for much of his first two seasons, playing four games in his rookie season, and featuring in 18 games in 2008, 17 as a starter. He scored his first career goal on May 2, 2009, in a game against Real Salt Lake. During the 2010 playoffs, he scored the game-winning goal against San Jose that sent the Colorado Rapids to MLS Cup 2010. Kimura then played for a full 90 minutes (plus 30 minutes of extra time) to help the Colorado Rapids capture the MLS Cup against FC Dallas with a 2–1 victory in Toronto, Ontario. While with Colorado Kimura appeared in 117 league matches and scored 4 goals.

Kimura was traded to Portland Timbers in exchange for allocation money and an international roster slot in July 2012. Five months later, Kimura was traded to New York Red Bulls along with a second-round pick in the 2013 MLS SuperDraft in exchange for Home Grown Player rights to Bryan Gallego and allocation money. On March 3, 2013, Kimura made his official debut for New York starting for his new club in a 3–3 draw against his former club Portland Timbers.

Following the 2014 season, New York announced that it would not exercise its 2015 contract option on Kimura.

In February 2015, Kimura signed with Polish side Widzew Łódź.

In July 2015, Kimura signed with Atlanta Silverbacks of the North American Soccer League.

In January 2016, he signed with expansion Rayo OKC.

On December 7, 2017, Nashville SC announced Kimura as a new signing.

=== Coaching ===
Kimura first began coaching for Nashville SC before departing the club in October 2024.

In July 2025, Kimura joined Masaki Hemmi's staff at USL Super League club Lexington SC. Kimura was promoted to the role of head coach after Hemmi was reassigned to Lexington SC's USL Championship squad on December 9, 2025.

== Personal life ==
Kimura holds a U.S. green card which qualifies him as a domestic player for MLS roster purposes.

== Honours ==
Colorado Rapids

- Major League Soccer Eastern Conference Championship: 2010
- MLS Cup: 2010

New York Red Bulls

- MLS Supporters' Shield: 2013
