= Masaki Hemmi =

Japanese footballer (born 1986)

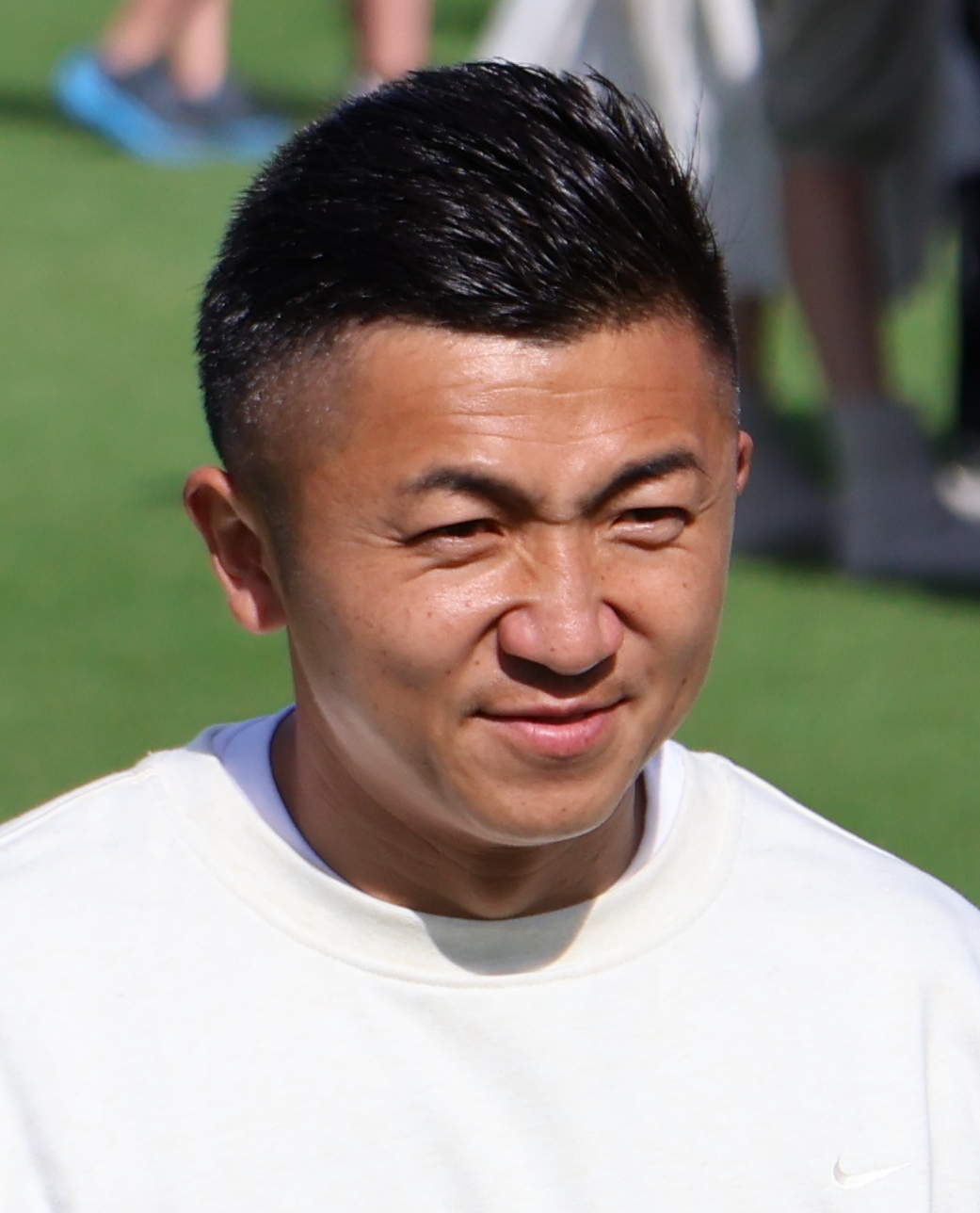
- Hemmi with the Chicago Stars in 2025

Personal information
- Full name: Masaki Hemmi
- Date of birth: August 14, 1986 (age 40)
- Place of birth: Tokyo, Japan
- Height: 1.70 m (5 ft 7 in)
- Position: Midfielder

Team information
- Current team: Lexington SC

Youth career
- New Mexico Strikers
- Carlsbad Cavemen

College career
Years	Team	Apps	(Gls)
2005–2006	Colorado Mines Orediggers	45	(3)
2009	Colorado Mines Orediggers	21	(0)

Senior career*
Years	Team	Apps	(Gls)
2006–2008	Colorado Rapids U-23	32	(2)
2009	Portland Timbers U23s	13	(2)
2010	Viktoria Arnoldsweiler		
2011	Sevilla FC Puerto Rico	8	(0)
2011	FB Gulbene	11	(2)
2012	Rochester Rhinos	2	(1)
2013	Real Colorado Foxes	2	(0)

Managerial career
- 2016–2022: Denver Pioneers (assistant)
- 2021: INAC Kobe (assistant)
- 2022: New Mexico United (assistant)
- 2023: New Mexico United (interim)
- 2024–2025: Chicago Stars (assistant)
- 2025: Chicago Stars (interim)
- 2025: Lexington SC (women)
- 2025–: Lexington SC
- * Club domestic league appearances and goals as of June 3, 2013

Masaki Hemmi (辺見 昌樹, Henmi Masaki; born August 14, 1986) is a Japanese former footballer who is the head coach of Lexington SC.

== Early life ==
Hemmi was born and raised in Tokyo, Japan and moved to Carlsbad, New Mexico when he was 16 years old. He played collegiate soccer at Colorado School of Mines for two seasons before transferring to the University of New Mexico in his junior year. After retiring from playing soccer, Hemmi returned to Colorado to finish his degree and began coaching a youth club, Real Colorado, in Denver.

== Coaching career ==
=== INAC Kobe, 2021 ===
In 2021, Hemmi worked one season as the associate head coach for INAC Kobe of the Japanese Professional Women's Soccer League (WE League) in the lead-up to the Tokyo Olympics.

=== New Mexico United, 2022–2023 ===
Hemmi served as first assistant coach and director of player personnel with the United Soccer League (USL) club New Mexico United. In 2023, Hemmi was announced the interim coach of the New Mexico United following the departure of then-head coach Zach Prince.

=== Chicago Stars FC, 2024–2025 ===
In January 2024, the Chicago Red Stars (later named Chicago Stars FC) announced the hired Hemmi as an assistant coach under head coach Lorne Donaldson. In late April 2025, Hemmi became Chicago's interim head coach following the firing of Donaldson. In his first game in charge of the Stars, He piloted the team to a 0–0 draw with NJ/NY Gotham FC, snapping a two-game losing streak. Hemmi's tenure as interim coach lasted until July 1, 2025, at which point he left the position to pursue other opportunities.

=== Lexington SC, 2025 ===
Hemmi was named head coach for USL Super League club Lexington SC on July 3, 2025.

=== Lexington SC, 2025– ===
On 9 December 2025, Hemmi was reassigned to Lexington SC, as Kosuke Kimura was promoted to head coach of Lexington SC Women.
