= Michael Dickey =

American soccer coach

Personal information
- Date of birth: December 19, 1963 (age 62)
- Place of birth: United States

Managerial career
- Years: Team
- 1997–99: Delaware Wizards
- 2010: United States U17 (women's)
- 2017–2018: Jordan (women's)
- 2024–2025: Lexington SC USLS

Michael Dickey is an American soccer coach. Dickey is also currently on the US Soccer Coaching Education staff teaching both the A and B license. In addition to this duty he also is on the National Scouting staff for US Soccer and coaches National/Regional teams in the Olympic Development Program. He is also the Co-Founder of the Olympic Development Program in Europe

== Early life ==
Dickey was born in the United States but spent 27 years of his childhood abroad since his father worked for the U.S. Department of Defense. Dickey was introduced to soccer when he was living in Taiwan. His family later settled in Germany where Dickey had his high school and college education

== Coaching career ==
=== Early years ===
After a short stint as a football player in Germany, Dickey started his coaching career with a small club, SC Schwartz Weiss Bad Kreuznach, in Germany. In 1996, he was appointed head coach of the Delaware Wizards which then played at the United States International Soccer League. After he left Delaware he became an Assistant Coach for the Hershey Wildcats that played in the A league of the United Soccer League. Dickey has coached numerous youth club teams to State Championships, Directed the Region 2 Olympic Development Soccer Program, coached both National and Regional ODP teams, Co-founded the USYS ODP program in Europe and currently serves as the Director of Coaching for Mockingbird Valley Premier Soccer Club in Louisville, Kentucky.

=== United States women's youth ===
Simultaneously while coaching the Delaware Wizards, Dickey worked with the U.S. Soccer Federation as a coach in its Olympic Development Program. This led to a staff coaching position with the United States women's national team youth system. He started working with the under-14 team in 2005 as its head coach and later served head coach of the under-15, under-16, and under-17 teams in the subsequent years.

He was assistant coach of the U.S. team that finished second in the 2008 FIFA U-17 Women's World Cup. He was appointed to coach the U-17 national team two years later after they had failed to qualify for the 2010 FIFA U-17 Women's World Cup. In 2009, Dickey guested as a coach with the India women's national football team and helped them in preparation for an international tournament which they won and returned to the FIFA rankings. In 2018 Dickey was selected to become the Head Coach of the Women’s National team of Jordan

=== Jordan women's ===
On May 1, 2017, the Jordan Football Association announced that they have Dickey signed Dickey as head coach of the Jordan women's national football team.

=== Mockingbird Valley ===
Following his time with the Jordan national team, Dickey joined Louisville, Kentucky-based Mockingbird Valley Premier SC as director of coaching & player development.

=== Lexington SC ===
On January 9, 2024, Dickey was announced as the inaugural coach for Lexington SC's USL Super League side.
