= Regal Soccer Stadium =

Soccer stadium in Tennessee

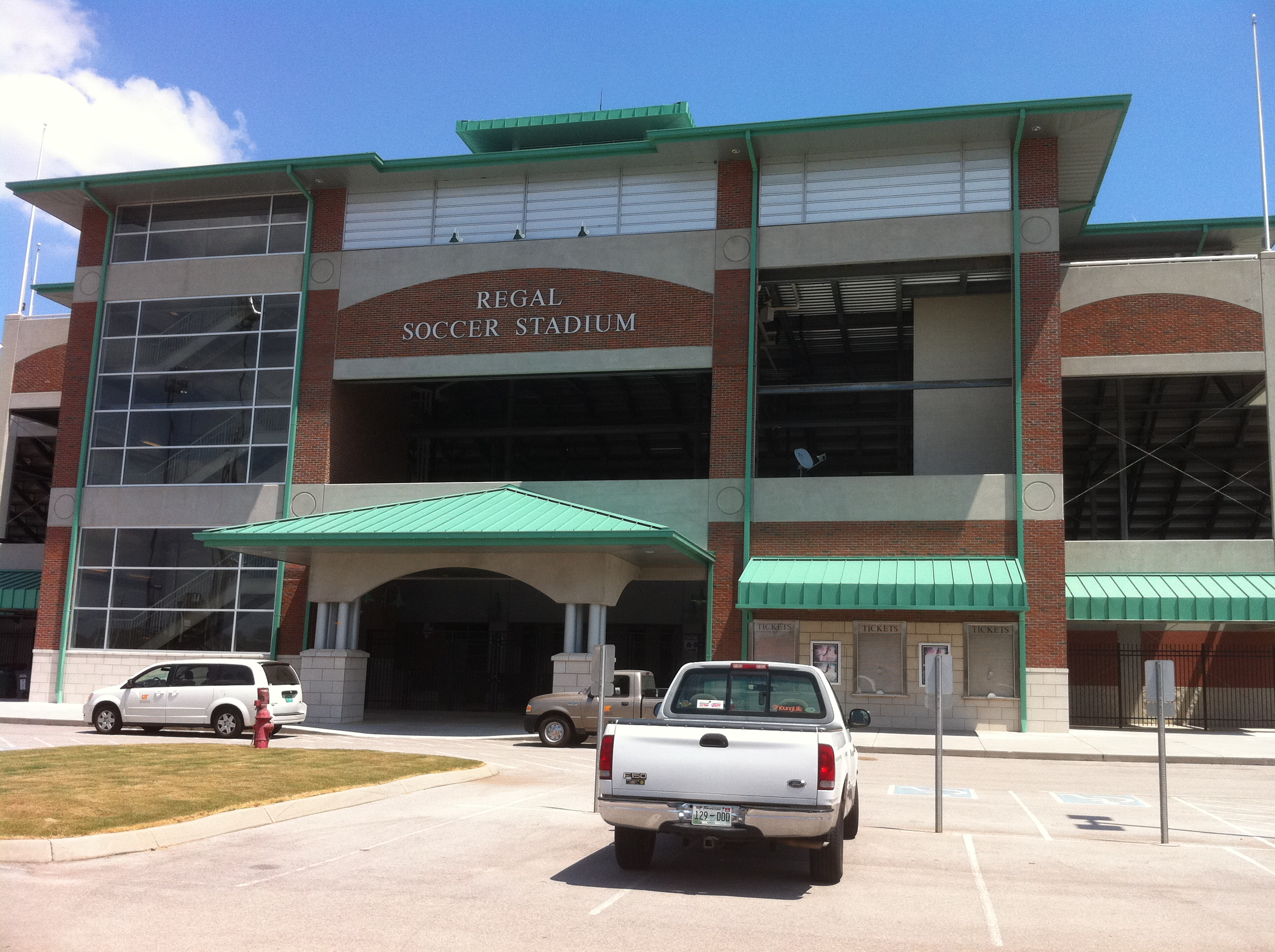
- Front entrance of the stadium, 2011
- Interactive map of Regal Soccer Stadium
- Full name: Regal Soccer Stadium (2007–present)
- Former names: Tennessee Soccer Complex (1996–2007)
- Address: 2317 Stephenson Drive; Knoxville, Tennessee; 37916
- Coordinates: 35°56′44″N 83°56′1″W
- Owner: University of Tennessee
- Operator: Univ. of Tennessee Athletics
- Capacity: 3,000
- Type: Soccer-specific stadium
- Surface: Bermuda grass
- Record attendance: 3,499 (Auburn, October 13th, 2024)
- Field size: 80 yard x 120 yard
- Parking: 700

Construction
- Opened: August 30, 1996; 30 years ago
- Cost: $5.4 million

Tenants
- Tennessee Lady Vols (NCAA) (1996–present); One Knoxville SC (USL1) (2023–2024)

Website
- utsports.com/regal-soccer-stadium

Regal Soccer Stadium is a soccer-specific stadium in Knoxville, Tennessee. This stadium hosts the Tennessee Lady Volunteers soccer team in the NCAA.The stadium is located on the University of Tennessee's campus, adjacent to Sherri Parker Lee Stadium, home of the Tennessee Lady Vols Softball team. The stadium has a maximum capacity of 3,000 fans.

The stadium's initial name was the "Tennessee Soccer Complex", but was changed to its current name after a donation from Regal Cinemas in 2007.

One Knoxville SC used this stadium as a temporary venue for the 2023 and 2024 seasons before the new ground, Covenant Health Park, hosted in Old City in Downtown Knoxville, opened in 2025. The new stadium also hosts the Knoxville Smokies, a Double A affiliate of the Chicago Cubs.

== Opening ==
Opening day of the facility was August 30, 1996. The Lady Vols played host to the Chattanooga Mocs, where 2,631 saw the game.

== Public transportation ==
The University of Tennessee has gameday buses that travel from the school's agricultural campus to the stadium.

== Record attendance ==
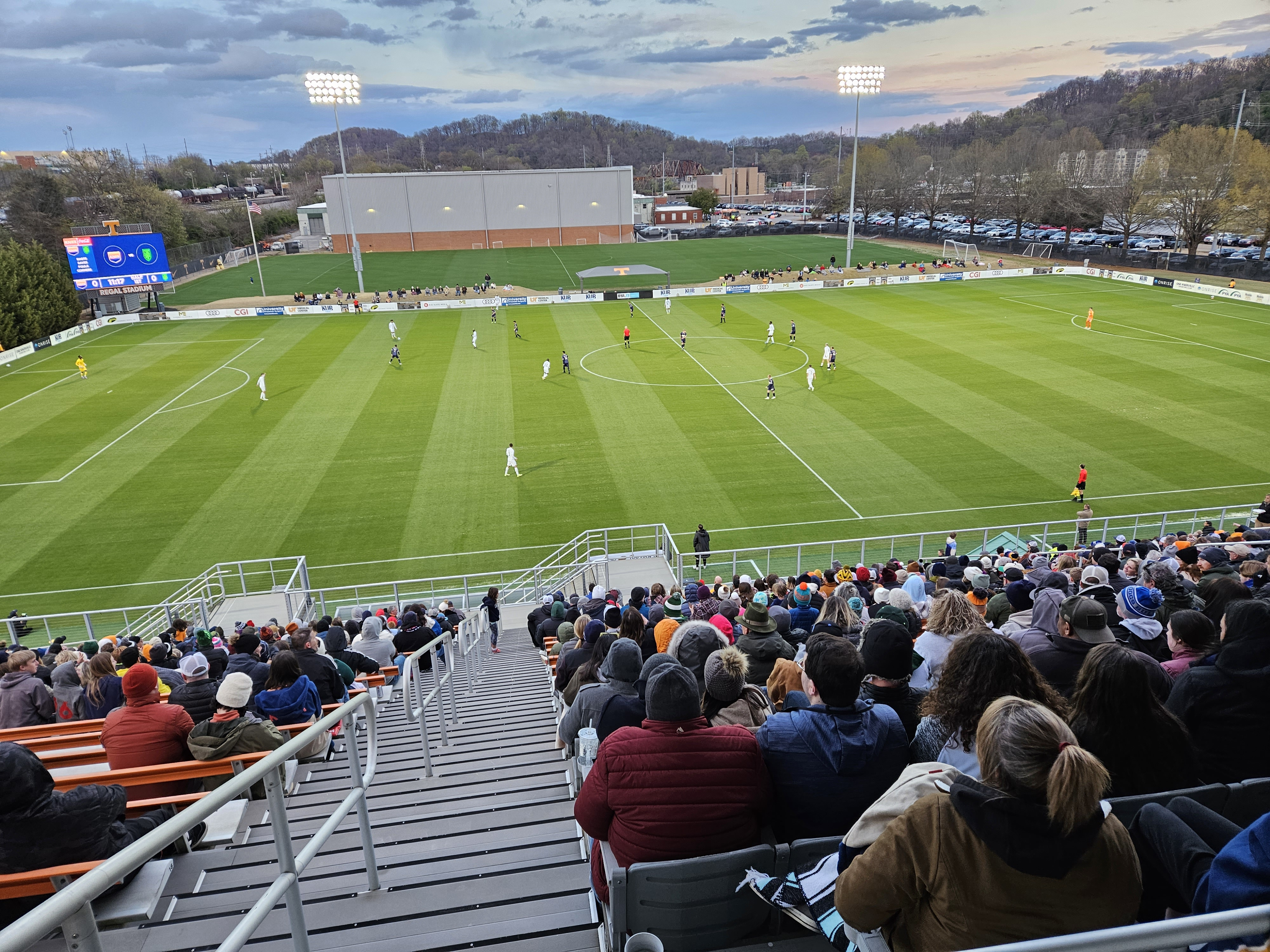
Regal Soccer Stadium hosting the One Knoxville SC matchup versus Lexington SC in front of a then record 2,512 fans

The record attendance at the stadium is when the Tennessee Lady Vols hosted the Auburn Tigers for their senior night for the 2024 season. 3,499 fans saw the then 14th ranked Auburn Tigers beat the Tennessee Vols 3-2.

The old record attendance for over 23 years at the stadium is when Tennessee Lady Vols hosted then No.1 ranked North Carolina Tar Heels in front of 3,042 fans in the 2001 season.

One Knoxville SC achieved their then club's attendance record on their home opener against rival Lexington SC in front of 2,512 fans on March 18, 2023.
