= Lucas Silva (footballer, born 1997) =

Brazilian footballer

Personal information
- Full name: Lucas Silva dos Santos
- Date of birth: 19 February 1997 (age 29)
- Place of birth: Barra Mansa, Brazil
- Height: 1.82 m (6 ft 0 in)
- Position: Left-back

Youth career
- –2017: Vasco da Gama
- 2016: → Flamengo-SP (loan)

Senior career*
Years	Team	Apps	(Gls)
2017–2020	Académico Viseu	56	(5)
2020–2021	Estoril	0	(0)
2021–2022	Amora	28	(1)
2022–2023	Feirense	35	(1)
2024	San Antonio FC	9	(2)
- * Club domestic league appearances and goals as of 31 October 2024

Lucas Silva dos Santos (born 19 February 1997), commonly known as Lucas Silva, is a Brazilian professional footballer who plays as a left-back.

== Career ==
On 18 January 2024, Silva moved from Liga Portugal 2 club Feirense to USL Championship side San Antonio FC.

== Career statistics ==
=== Club ===
As of match played 17 December 2023

Appearances and goals by club, season and competition
Club	Season	League			Cup		League cup		Total	
Club	Season	Division	Apps	Goals	Apps	Goals	Apps	Goals	Apps	Goals
Académico Viseu	2017–18	LigaPro	17	1	0	0	0	0	17	1
Académico Viseu	2018–19	LigaPro	27	4	2	0	1	0	30	4
Académico Viseu	2019–20	LigaPro	12	0	4	0	0	0	16	0
Académico Viseu	Total		56	5	6	0	1	0	63	5
Estoril	2020–21	Liga Portugal 2	0	0	0	0	0	0	0	0
Amora	2021–22	Liga 3	28	1	1	0	—		29	1
Feirense	2022–23	Liga Portugal 2	27	1	0	0	4	0	31	1
Feirense	2023–24	Liga Portugal 2	8	0	1	0	1	0	10	0
Feirense	Total		35	1	1	0	5	0	41	1
San Antonio FC	2024	USL Championship	0	0	0	0	—		0	0
Career total			119	7	8	0	6	0	133	7
