= Mohamed Omar (footballer, born 1999) =

Somali footballer (born 1999)

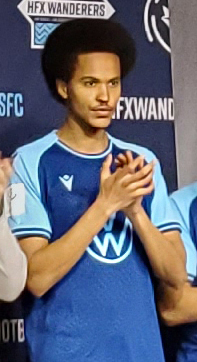

Personal information
- Date of birth: 22 January 1999 (age 27)
- Place of birth: Toronto, Ontario, Canada
- Height: 6 ft 3 in (1.91 m)
- Positions: Midfielder; centre-back

Team information
- Current team: Indy Eleven
- Number: 22

Youth career
- Toronto FC
- Black Rock FC
- Toronto FC

College career
Years	Team	Apps	(Gls)
2018–2021	Notre Dame Fighting Irish	69	(6)

Senior career*
Years	Team	Apps	(Gls)
2018	Toronto FC III	3	(0)
2019	Chicago FC United	8	(1)
2022–2023	HFX Wanderers FC	40	(0)
2024–2025	San Antonio FC	21	(1)
2026–	Indy Eleven	14	(0)

International career^{‡}
2025–	Somalia	7	(1)
- * Club domestic league appearances and goals as of 31 October 2026 ‡ National team caps and goals as of 17 November 2025

Mohamed Omar (Somali: Maxamed Cumar; born 22 January 1999) is a professional footballer who currently plays as a midfielder or a centre-back for Indy Eleven in the USL Championship. Born in Canada, he plays for the Somalia national team.

== Early life ==
In 2013, he joined the Toronto FC Academy. He later moved to the United States to attend high school at the Berkshire School, also playing club soccer with Black Rock FC. He was named the top high school player in Massachusetts in 2017. He later spent some time training with Toronto FC II when he returned home over the summer.

== College career ==
In 2018, he began attending the University of Notre Dame, where he played for the men's soccer team. He scored his first goal on September 6, 2019, against the Seattle Redhawks.

In his senior year in 2021, he was named team captain. He helped Notre Dame to the semifinals of the 2021 NCAA Division I Men's Soccer Tournament, where they lost to the eventual champions Clemson Tigers in penalty kicks.

== Club career ==
In 2018, he played with Toronto FC III in League1 Ontario. In 2019, he played with Chicago FC United in USL League Two.

At the 2022 MLS SuperDraft, Omar was selected with the 23rd pick overall by the Colorado Rapids in the first round. He attended pre-season with the club, but was unable to sign a contract due to roster limitations.

In February 2022, Omar signed a one-year contract with a club option for 2023 with the HFX Wanderers of the Canadian Premier League. He made his professional debut on April 23, coming on as a substitute against Pacific FC.

In December 2022, HFX announced that they were exercising Omar's contract option, keeping him with the club through 2023. He was named an assistant captain by Halifax for the 2023 season.

He left the club at the end of the 2023 season, following the expiration of his contract. In December 2023, he signed with San Antonio FC of the USL Championship, ahead of the 2024 season. In April 2026, he signed with Indy Eleven in the USL Championship.

== International career ==
In 2018, Omar attended a training camp with the Canadian under-20 national team.

In May 2024, Omar received his first call-up to the Somali national team for two 2026 FIFA World Cup qualification matches against Mozambique and Botswana.

== Career statistics ==
As of 11 May 2024

Club	Season	League			Playoffs		Domestic Cup		Other		Total	
Club	Season	Division	Apps	Goals	Apps	Goals	Apps	Goals	Apps	Goals	Apps	Goals
Toronto FC III	2018	League1 Ontario	3	0	–		–		3 (Note: Appearances in League1 Ontario League Cup)	0	6	0
Chicago FC United	2019	USL League Two	8	1	1	0	–		–		9	1
HFX Wanderers FC	2022	Canadian Premier League	15	0	—		2	0	–		17	0
HFX Wanderers FC	2023	Canadian Premier League	25	0	1	0	1	0	–		27	0
HFX Wanderers FC	Total		40	0	1	0	3	0	0	0	44	0
San Antonio FC	2024	USL Championship	7	0	0	0	1	0	–		8	0
Career total			58	1	1	0	4	0	3	0	66	1
