= Kameron Lacey =

Jamaican footballer (born 2001)

Personal information
- Full name: Kameron Kenneth Lacey
- Date of birth: January 16, 2001 (age 25)
- Place of birth: Miami, Florida, U.S.
- Height: 1.74 m (5 ft 9 in)
- Positions: Forward; attacking midfielder

Youth career
- –2016: Miramar United
- 2016–2018: FC Dallas
- 2018–2019: Orlando City
- 2019: Montverde Academy

College career
Years	Team	Apps	(Gls)
2019–2022	Charlotte 49ers	58	(17)

Senior career*
Years	Team	Apps	(Gls)
2022	Asheville City	3	(1)
2023	Minnesota United 2	20	(10)
2024	San Antonio FC	16	(0)
2024	→ Lexington SC (loan)	9	(1)
2025	Birmingham Legion	0	(0)
2026	Asheville City	0	(0)

International career^{‡}
2018	Jamaica U-20	2	(0)
- * Club domestic league appearances and goals as of October 25, 2025 ‡ National team caps and goals as of January 17, 2024

Kameron Kenneth Lacey (born January 16, 2001) is a Jamaican professional footballer who plays as a forward.

== Career ==
=== Youth ===
Lacey played for the academies of FC Dallas and Orlando City, where he was part of their U17 and U19 Conference Championship-winning teams respectively. Lacey attended Montverde Academy in 2019 before committing to the University of North Carolina at Charlotte. Prior to joining the Major League Soccer academies, Lacey played for his hometown Super Y League club Miramar United.

=== College and amateur ===
In four seasons at Charlotte, Lacey played in 58 games, scoring 17 goals and assisting on 14 more for the 49ers. He was named to the United Soccer Coaches All-East Region Second Team in December 2022.

Lacey played the 2022 USL League Two season with Asheville City.

=== Professional ===
Lacey was selected 82nd overall by FC Dallas in the 2023 MLS SuperDraft but was ultimately not signed by the club. He was one of five Asheville City players selected in the draft.

Lacey signed his first professional contract in May 2023, joining MLS Next Pro side Minnesota United 2 after a successful trial period. He led the team in goals but was not retained by the club following the 2023 season.

On January 17, 2024, Lacey signed with USL Championship club San Antonio FC.

On August 23, 2024, San Antonio FC announced they were loaning Lacey to USL League One side Lexington SC for the remainder of the season. Lacey's contract option was declined by San Antonio in November 2024.

On May 23, 2025, Lacey signed with USL Championship side Birmingham Legion. He was released by Birmingham following their 2025 season.
