= Hugo Mbongue =

Canadian soccer player (born 2004)

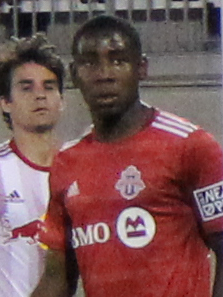
- Mbongue with Toronto FC II in 2023

Personal information
- Full name: Hugo-Hilaire Thomas Henry Mbongue Mbongue
- Date of birth: July 27, 2004 (age 22)
- Place of birth: Toronto, Ontario, Canada
- Height: 1.78 m (5 ft 10 in)
- Position: Forward

Team information
- Current team: Charlotte FC
- Number: 83

Youth career
- Cherry Beach RC
- Clairlea-Westview SC
- North Toronto Nitros
- Toronto FC

Senior career*
Years	Team	Apps	(Gls)
2021	Toronto FC III	5	(4)
2021–2022	Toronto FC II	26	(4)
2022–2025	Toronto FC	12	(0)
2023	→ Toronto FC II (loan)	15	(5)
2024	→ San Antonio FC (loan)	21	(3)
2025	→ Lexington SC (loan)	6	(0)
2025	→ Vancouver FC (loan)	12	(6)
2026–	Crown Legacy FC	22	(14)
2026–	Charlotte FC	0	(0)

International career^{‡}
2019	Canada U15	4	(4)
2022	Canada U20	4	(0)
- * Club domestic league appearances and goals as of September 20, 2026 ‡ National team caps and goals as of July 18, 2022

Hugo-Hilaire Thomas Henry Mbongue Mbongue (born July 27, 2004) is a Canadian soccer player who plays for Charlotte FC in Major League Soccer.

== Early life ==
Mbongue began playing soccer for the Cherry Beach Recreation Centre when he was three. When he was four, he began playing with Clairlea-Westview SC. Afterwards, he joined the North Toronto Nitros, before later moving on to the Toronto FC Academy.

== Club career ==
=== Toronto FC and loans ===
He joined Toronto FC II of USL League One for the 2021 season, as an academy call-up. He made his debut for Toronto FC II on May 22, 2021 against North Texas SC. He joined Toronto FC III during the summer for the 2021 League1 Ontario Summer Championship season. He attended the first team's pre-season in 2022, scoring the tying goal in the 89th minute in an exhibition match against Sporting Kansas City. He scored his first official professional goal on April 10, scoring twice against New York City FC II in MLS Next Pro. He signed his first professional contract with Toronto FC II on May 27 (he had been playing on an academy contract prior to this).

In September 2022, he signed a Homegrown Player contract with the first team, Toronto FC in Major League Soccer, through the year 2025, with an team option for 2026. On October 9, he made his first team debut, as a substitute, in the final game of the 2022 against the Philadelphia Union. In April 2023, he was loaned to Toronto FC II.

In March 2024, he was loaned to San Antonio FC of the USL Championship for the 2024 season. He scored his first goal in his debut on March 23 against the Colorado Springs Switchbacks. In March 2025, he was loaned to Lexington SC in the USL Championship. In July 2025, he was recalled from his loan with Lexington and immediately re-loaned to Vancouver FC in the Canadian Premier League. He scored his first goal for Vancouver on August 4, 2025, in a 2-1 victory over HFX Wanderers FC. In October 2025 Toronto FC would decline Mbongue's contract option, ending his time at the club after four years.

=== Crown Legacy FC ===
In February 2026, he signed with Crown Legacy FC for the 2026 season, with options through June 2029. On March 6, 2026, he made his debut and score is first goal in a 7-2 victory over Huntsville City FC.

== International career ==
Mbongue was named to the Canadian U15 squad for the 2019 CONCACAF Boys' Under-15 Championship. In their opening match, he scored a hat trick in a 7-0 victory over El Salvador U15. In June 2022, he was named to the Canadian U-20 team for the 2022 CONCACAF U-20 Championship.

== Personal life ==
Mbongue is of Cameroonian descent through his parents. He is the younger brother of fellow professional soccer player Ralph Priso.

== Career statistics ==
As of match played October 22, 2025

Appearances and goals by club, season and competition
Club	Season	League			Playoffs		National cup		Continental		Other		Total	
Club	Season	Division	Apps	Goals	Apps	Goals	Apps	Goals	Apps	Goals	Apps	Goals	Apps	Goals
Toronto FC III	2021	League1 Ontario	5	4	—		—		—		—		5	4
Toronto FC II	2021	USL League One	10	0	—		—		—		—		10	0
Toronto FC II	2022	MLS Next Pro	16	4	2	1	—		—		—		18	5
Toronto FC	2022	MLS	1	0	—		0	0	—		—		1	0
Toronto FC	2023	MLS	11	0	—		0	0	—		2 (Note: Appearances in Leagues Cup)	0	13	0
Toronto FC	Total		12	0	0	0	0	0	0	0	2	0	14	0
Toronto FC II (loan)	2023	MLS Next Pro	15	5	—		—		—		—		15	5
San Antonio FC (loan)	2024	USL Championship	21	3	0	0	0	0	—		—		21	3
Lexington SC (loan)	2025	USL Championship	6	0	0	0	1	0	—		1	0	8	0
Vancouver FC (loan)	2025	Canadian Premier League	12	6	—		3	1	—		—		15	7
Career total			97	22	2	1	4	1	0	0	3	0	106	24
