= Forster Ajago =

Ghanaian footballer (born 2001)

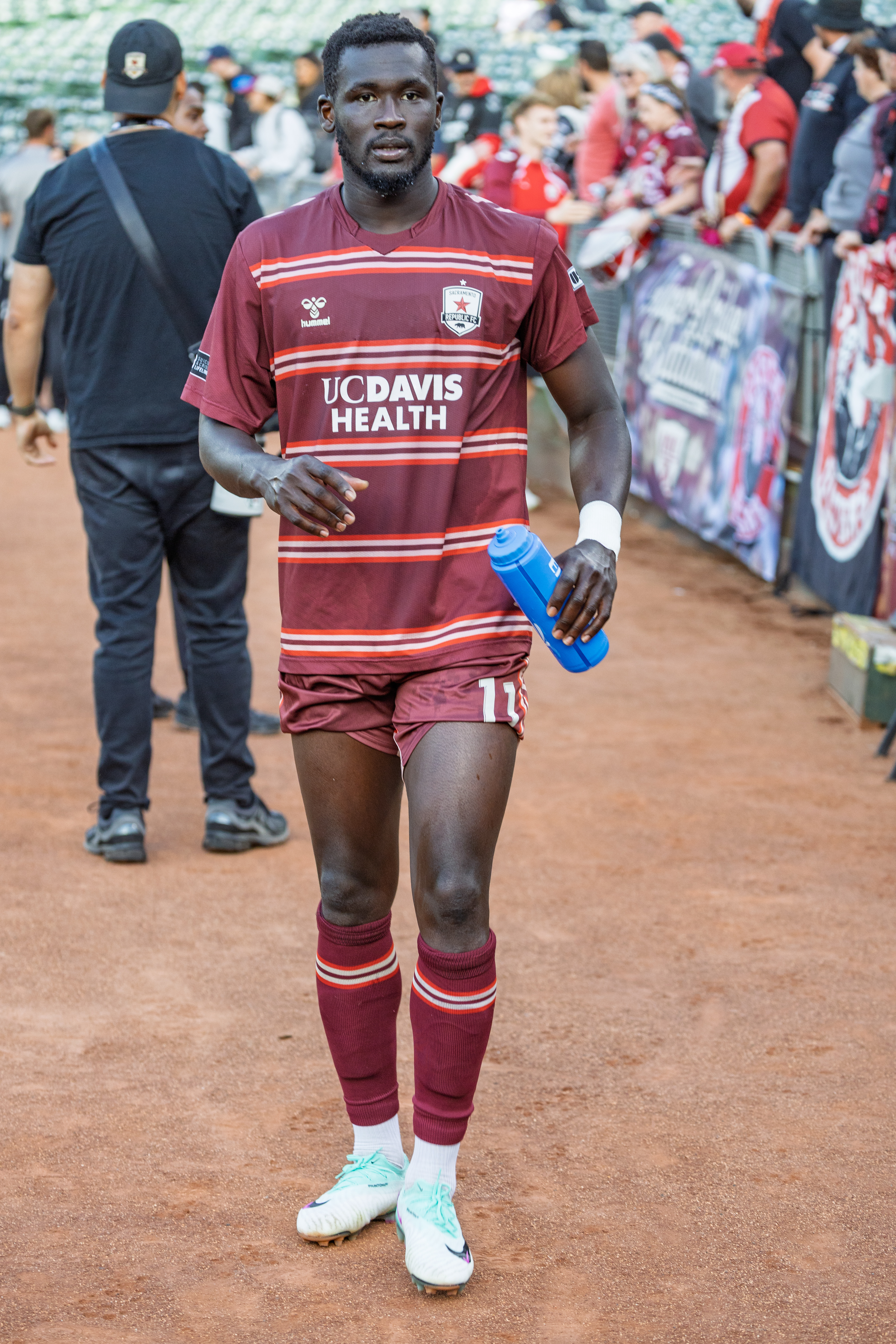
- Ajago with the Sacramento Republic in 2026

Personal information
- Full name: Forster Wekem Ajago
- Date of birth: 16 August 2001 (age 25)
- Place of birth: Navrongo, Ghana
- Position: Striker

Team information
- Current team: Sacramento Republic
- Number: 11

College career
Years	Team	Apps	(Gls)
2020–2021	Delaware Fightin' Blue Hens	5	(1)
2021–2022	Dayton Flyers	35	(13)
2023	Duke Blue Devils	18	(14)

Senior career*
Years	Team	Apps	(Gls)
2024	Nashville SC	12	(0)
2024	→ Huntsville City (loan)	12	(7)
2025	Real Salt Lake	6	(1)
2025	Real Monarchs	3	(0)
2025	→ Lexington SC (loan)	20	(6)
2026-	Sacramento Republic	21	(3)
- * Club domestic league appearances and goals

Forster Ajago (born 16 August 2001) is a Ghanaian footballer who plays as a striker for Sacramento Republic.

== Biography ==
Ajago was a Ghana youth international. He is the son of Cletus Danghe Ajago and Anita Ajago. Ajago attended Duke University in the United States. He previously attended St. Augustine's College in Ghana. Ajago started his career with American side Nashville SC. In 2024, he was sent on loan to American side Huntsville City FC. He was released by Nashville following their 2024 season. He was subsequently selected by Real Salt Lake in the MLS Re-Entry Draft. On 25 April 2025, Ajago was loaned to USL Championship side Lexington SC for the remainder of the season.

On 9 December 2025, Ajago signed for fellow USL Championship side Sacramento Republic.

== Personal life ==
Ajago was born in 2001 in Ghana. He is a native of Navrongo, Ghana.

== Honors ==
Individual

- NCAA Second-Team All-American: 2023
