= Bura Nogueira =

Bissau-Guinean footballer

Burá
Personal information
- Full name: Jorge Braíma Candé Nogueira
- Date of birth: 22 December 1995 (age 30)
- Place of birth: Bissau, Guinea-Bissau
- Height: 1.78 m (5 ft 10 in)
- Position: Defensive midfielder

Team information
- Current team: Lusitano de Évora
- Number: 13

Senior career*
Years	Team	Apps	(Gls)
2013–2014	Estrela Negra		
2015–2016	Bissau de Benfica		
2016–2017	Vilanovenses		
2017–2019	Oriental	28	(8)
2018–2019	→ Aves (loan)	0	(0)
2019–2022	Farense	39	(0)
2022–2023	Mes Kerman	18	(0)
2024	San Antonio FC	21	(1)
2025–2026	Costa do Sol		
2026	União de Santarém	12	(1)
2026–	Lusitano de Évora	5	(0)

International career^{‡}
2015–	Guinea-Bissau	41	(2)
- * Club domestic league appearances and goals as of 12 September 2026 ‡ National team caps and goals as of 31 March 2025

Jorge Braíma Candé Nogueira (born 22 December 1995), known as Burá, is a Bissau-Guinean footballer who plays for Portuguese Liga 3 club Lusitano de Évora and the Guinea-Bissau national team as a defensive midfielder.

== Football career ==
On 28 July 2018, Bura made his professional debut with Aves in a 2018–19 Taça da Liga match against Santa Clara.

On 13 July 2019, he signed a two-year contract with Farense, with the club holding an additional one-year extension option. Bura epresented the national team at 2019 Africa Cup of Nations

Bura signed with USL Championship side San Antonio FC on 19 January 2024.

== Career statistics ==
=== International ===
As of match played 31 March 2026

Appearances and goals by national team and year
National team	Year	Apps	Goals
Guinea-Bissau	2015	2	0
Guinea-Bissau	2019	7	0
Guinea-Bissau	2020	3	1
Guinea-Bissau	2021	6	0
Guinea-Bissau	2022	6	0
Guinea-Bissau	2023	2	0
Guinea-Bissau	2024	8	1
Guinea-Bissau	2025	5	0
Guinea-Bissau	2026	2	0
Total		41	2

Scores and results list Guinea-Bissau's goal tally first, score column indicates score after each Nogueira goal.

List of international goals scored by Bura Nogueira
No.	Date	Venue	Opponent	Score	Result	Competition	Ref.
1	8 October 2020	Óbidos, Portugal	Mozambique	1–0	1–0	Friendly	
2	5 September 2024	Estádio 24 de Setembro, Bissau, Guinea-Bissau	Eswatini	1–0	1–0	2025 Africa Cup of Nations qualification	
