= Kendall Burks =

American soccer player (born 1999)

Personal information
- Date of birth: October 8, 1999 (age 27)
- Place of birth: Federal Way, Washington, United States
- Height: 6 ft 2 in (1.88 m)
- Position: Defender

Team information
- Current team: Lexington SC
- Number: 5

Youth career
- –2018: Washington Premier

College career
Years	Team	Apps	(Gls)
2018–2019	CSU Bakersfield Roadrunners	36	(0)
2020–2021	Washington Huskies	38	(5)

Senior career*
Years	Team	Apps	(Gls)
2018–2019	Seattle Sounders FC U-23	11	(0)
2022–2023	Chicago Fire	13	(0)
2022–2023	Chicago Fire II	25	(1)
2024	San Antonio FC	34	(0)
2025–	Lexington SC	52	(0)
- * Club domestic league appearances and goals as of October 31, 2026

Kendall Burks (born October 8, 1999) is an American professional soccer player who plays as a defender for USL Championship club Lexington SC.

== Career ==
=== Youth, college & amateur ===
Burks attended Stadium High School in Tacoma, Washington, where he earned second team All-Pierce County League honors as a freshman and first team honors as a sophomore and a junior. As a junior Burks was also named Pierce County League MVP, first team all-region and all-state. He also played club soccer with Washington Premier FC, where he helped the team to four state titles.

In 2018, Burks committed to play college soccer at California State University, Bakersfield. In two seasons with the Roadrunners, Burks made 36 appearances and had two assists to his name. In his freshman season, he earned All-Western Athletic Conference Freshman Team honors. In 2020, Burks transferred to the University of Washington, going on to play 38 times for the Huskies, where he scored five goals and tallied four assists. In 2021, he was an All-Region Second Team and All-Pac-12 Conference Second Team selection.

While at college, Burks appeared in the USL League Two for Seattle Sounders FC U-23 during their 2018 and 2019 seasons.

=== Professional ===
On January 11, 2022, Burks was selected 11th overall in the 2022 MLS SuperDraft by Chicago Fire. He didn't immediately sign with Chicago after the draft, instead going on trial with EFL Championship side Nottingham Forest.

On February 25, 2022, Burks signed with Major League Soccer's Chicago Fire. He made his first team debut on April 19, 2022, starting in a Lamar Hunt U.S. Open Cup fixture against Union Omaha. He spent time with the club's MLS Next Pro team during their 2022 season.

On February 7, 2024, Burks joined USL Championship side San Antonio FC following his release from Chicago at the end of their 2023 season.

Burks signed with Lexington SC on December 31, 2024, ahead of the club's first season competing in the USL Championship.
