= Lexington SC =

American professional soccer club based in Lexington

Lexington
- Full name: Lexington Sporting Club
- Nickname: Greens
- Short name: Lexington SC; Lex SC; LSC
- Founded: October 5, 2021; 5 years ago
- Stadium: Lexington SC Stadium; Lexington, Kentucky
- Capacity: 7,500
- Owner(s): Bill and Donna Shively; Stephen Dawahare
- President: Vince Gabbert
- Coach: Masaki Hemmi
- League: USL Championship
- 2025: USLC, 9th Playoffs: DNQ
- Website: lexsporting.com
| Home colours | Away colours |

Lexington Sporting Club is an American professional soccer club based in Lexington, Kentucky. Founded in 2021 as an expansion side in USL League One—the third division of the United States soccer league system—the club fields two professional and three amateur teams across the American soccer pyramid: USL Championship (men's professional), USL Super League (women's professional), USL W League (women's pre-professional), USL League Two (men's pre-professional), and USL Academy (boys developmental).

== History ==
On October 5, 2021, the United Soccer League announced that Tower Hill Sports had been granted a USL League One expansion team in Lexington to start play in the 2023 season. Tentatively named "Lexington Pro Soccer", the team revealed its official colors, crest, and branding as Lexington Sporting Club on March 22, 2022.

=== USL League One (2023–2025) ===
The club entered League One play with its inaugural match on March 18, 2023, against fellow expansion side One Knoxville SC, where they fell 1–2; Don Smart scored the first goal in the club's history from a penalty kick in the 28th minute. The Greens won their first match on April 15, 2023, in a 2–1 victory over Tormenta FC in full time at Toyota Stadium in Georgetown.

By the end of their inaugural season, LSC finished ninth in USL League One, ahead of the reigning Supporters Shield winners Richmond Kickers, 2022 runners-up Chattanooga Red Wolves SC, and wooden-spoon winners Central Valley Fuego FC, with Senegalese forward/midfielder Ates Diouf finishing third in the Golden Boot race with 15 goals.

After two years in USL1, the club announced on August 13, 2024, that it would be leaving to join USL Championship starting in the 2025 season.

=== USL Championship (2025–present) ===
Ahead of the move to USLC, the team named former Oregon State and Austin FC coach Terry Boss as manager for the inaugural season.

Lexington had a promising start to its first campaign with a historic 2–0 win at home against conference rival Hartford Athletic, but ultimately it was disappointing season for the Greens. LSC finished ninth in the Western Conference with a 9–9–12 record, missing the playoffs following a final-day loss to Oakland Roots SC.

Following the 2025 season, it was announced Boss would not return as head coach.

On Tuesday, December 8, 2025, in a unique move by the club, women's coach Masaki Hemmi was appointed as head coach of the USL Championship team, while assistant coach Kosuke Kimura would take over for the women's squad. Both coaching changes took effect in January 2026 during the Super League winter break.

== Lexington SC Women ==
Lexington Sporting Club fields two women's teams within the USL structure: a professional team in the USL Super League and a pre-professional team in the USL W League. Former New Zealand international Michelle Reyner serves as the Women's Sporting Director, overseeing the entire player development process from youth to professional levels, with a focus on creating a seamless pathway for elite players.

=== Gainbridge Super League ===
In May 2023, Lexington was announced as an inaugural member of the new USL Super League, kicking off alongside Carolina Ascent FC, Brooklyn FC, Dallas Trinity FC, Spokane Zephyr FC, Tampa Bay Sun FC, Fort Lauderdale United FC, and DC Power FC, with Indy Eleven, Sporting Club Jacksonville, Forward Madison FC and teams in Chattanooga and Oakland set to join in subsequent seasons. On January 9, 2024, the club announced Michael Dickey as the team's first head coach.

The league is a Division I professional women's soccer league in the United States, alongside the National Women's Soccer League (NWSL), and is owned and operated by USL. Originally planned to launch in August 2023, the league opened play on Saturday, August 17, 2024, with two matches: a 1–0 Carolina Ascent FC win against DC Power FC, and a 1–1 draw between Spokane Zephyr FC and Fort Lauderdale United FC.

Lexington Sporting Club played its first-ever Super League match on August 25, 2024, away against Carolina Ascent FC. They then hosted their first home game on September 8, 2024, at Lexington SC Stadium. Lexington finished the 2024–25 Super League campaign at the bottom of the league standings with a 4–18–6 record.

Following the season, Lexington named Masaki "Mac" Hemmi as the new head coach of the women's team on July 3, 2025. He was formally introduced in a press conference on July 7, following his departure from a stint as interim head coach of the NWSL's Chicago Stars FC. Under his leadership, the team has seen vast improvement, currently sitting in first place with a 5–0–7 record and riding a 13-game unbeaten streak going back to last season, while also breaking Carolina Ascent FC's season-opening record of 12 games unbeaten. However, Hemmi is set to be replaced by assistant coach Kosuke Kimura in January 2026, following the league's winter break, as part of a coaching move to the men's side.

Since the beginning of the 2025–26 season, digital finance company Gainbridge has held official naming rights, making the league officially known as the "Gainbridge Super League".

=== USL W League ===
Announced in October 2022, Lexington SC has also participated in the USL W League, a pre-professional women's soccer league in the United States, since it officially began play in May 2023. The team competes in the Valley Division alongside Indy Eleven, Kings Hammer FC, Racing Louisville Academy, and St. Charles FC. The inaugural team played its matches at Toyota Stadium (Kentucky) in Georgetown, though now both the W League team and men's USL League Two team play in Lexington at the LSC Sports Complex.

Former National Women's Soccer League player Morgan Proffitt notably appeared in a handful of matches for the inaugural team.

Paul Dolinsky serves as the USLW head coach. Prior to LSC, Dolinsky served as the head coach for Indy Eleven's W-League squad, leading them on their 2023 title run.

== Rivalries ==
Lexington SC's main league and region rivals are One Knoxville SC, Louisville City FC, and Greenville Triumph SC.

=== The Battle of the Barrel (One Knoxville SC) ===
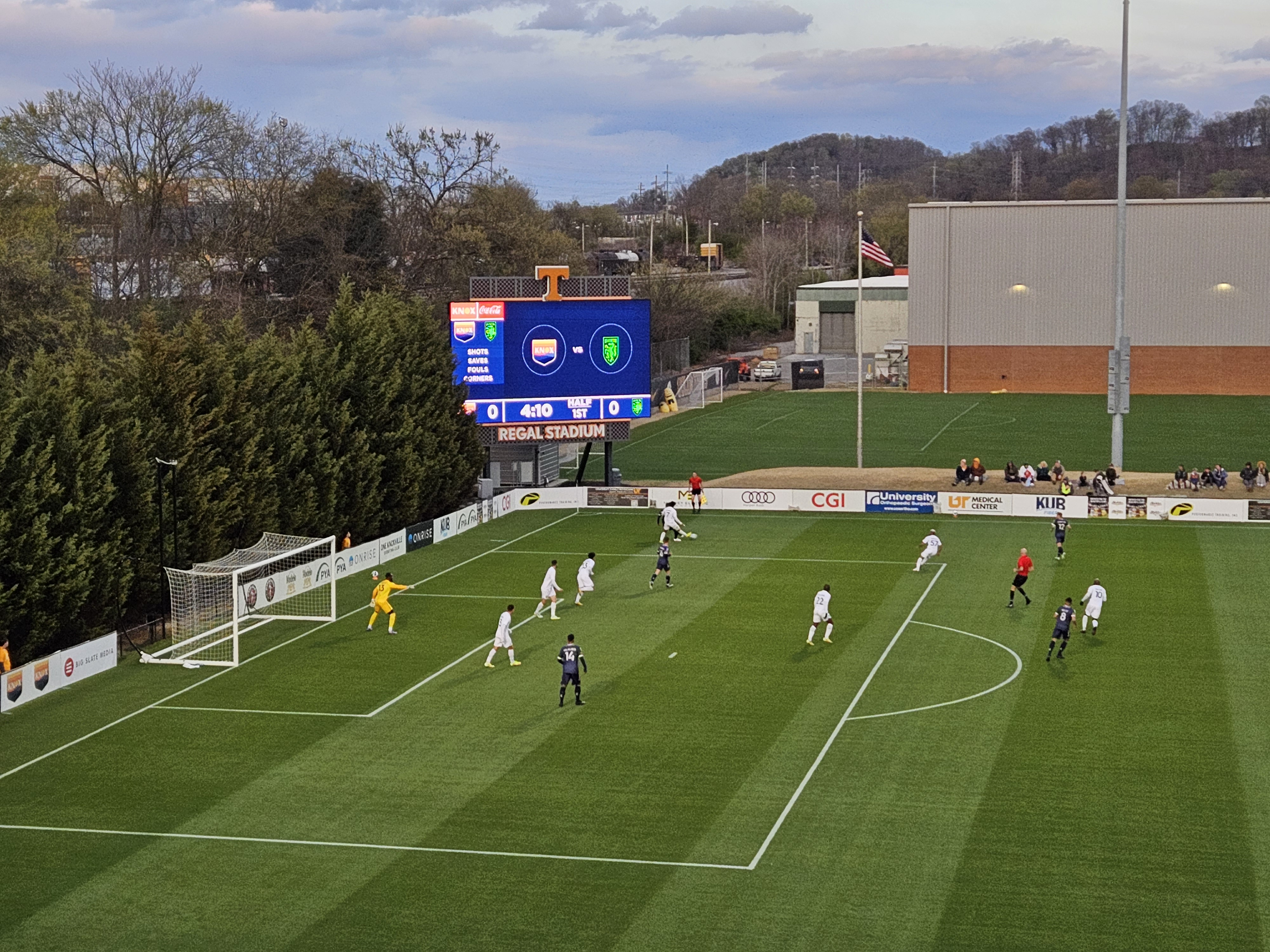
Lexington SC and One Knoxville SC facing off in both club's first ever USL1 match.

Lexington SC and One Knoxville joined USL League One as expansion sides together in 2023. The rivalry stems from the Kentucky–Tennessee rivalry as Lexington is home to the University of Kentucky and Knoxville is home to the University of Tennessee. The rivalry name comes from the old name for the matchup between Kentucky and Tennessee in college football where a beer barrel trophy was presented to the winner.

The reported trophy for the winner on aggregate score at the end of the USL1 season is "a full-size whiskey barrel and a bottle of bourbon from a distiller located in the losing club's locale." Despite this, neither fan group has yet to see such a prize as of the start of the 2024 season.

| Season | Date | Competition | Stadium | Home team | Result | Away team | Goal scorers | Attendance | Series | Ref |
|---|---|---|---|---|---|---|---|---|---|---|
| 2023 | March 18 | USL1 | Regal Stadium | One Knoxville SC | 2–1 | Lexington SC | (KNX) Villalobos 17' (pen.), Keegan 40' (LEX) Smart 28' (pen.) | 2,512 | KNX 1–0–0 | |
| 2023 | May 27 | USL1 | Toyota Stadium (Kentucky) | Lexington SC | 1–1 | One Knoxville SC | (LEX) Brown 43' (Robertson) (KNX) Keegan 66' (Leinhos) | 2,282 | KNX 1–1–0 | |
| 2023 | August 18 | USL1 | Regal Stadium | One Knoxville SC | 1–0 | Lexington SC | (KNX) Kelly-Rosales 49' (Crisler) | 2,522 | KNX 2–1–0 | |
| 2024 | March 23 | USL1 | Regal Stadium | One Knoxville SC | 2–0 | Lexington SC | (KNX) Castro Jr 70' (Kelly-Rosales) Ritchie 88' (Ballard) | 1,975 | KNX 3–1–0 | |
| 2024 | June 8 | USL Jägermeister Cup | Regal Stadium | One Knoxville SC | 2–0 | Lexington SC | Crisler 50' (Johnson) Ross 75' (Ritchie) | 1,955 | KNX 4–1–0 | |
| 2024 | August 10 | USL Jägermeister Cup | Toyota Stadium (Kentucky) | Lexington SC | 0–0 5–3 | One Knoxville SC | The match ended in a 0–0 draw. Lexington won the penalty shoot-out 5–3 for the extra point in the Central Group standings | 1,173 | KNX 4–2–0 | |
| 2024 | September 13 | USL1 | Lexington SC Stadium | Lexington SC | 1–0 | One Knoxville SC | (KNX) Richard Ballard 68' | 2,416 | KNX 5–2–0 | |

=== The Commonwealth Cup (Louisville City FC) ===
Lexington SC and Louisville City FC met for the first time in 2023 in the 2nd round of the U.S. Open Cup. The fans of both teams coined the term "El Bluegrassico" as a play on the name of the classic La Liga derby El Clásico and the nickname for Kentucky, "The Bluegrass State." Along with that, during their first match, an announcer coined the game as being "The Kentucky Derby Derby," in reference to both city's horseracing culture and the Kentucky Derby. Eventually, the rivalry was dubbed the Commonwealth Cup by both teams.

| Season | Date | Competition | Stadium | Home team | Result | Away team | Goal scorers | Attendance | Series | Ref |
|---|---|---|---|---|---|---|---|---|---|---|
| 2023 | April 5 | Lamar Hunt U.S. Open Cup | Lynn Family Stadium | Louisville City FC | 1–0 | Lexington SC | (LOU) Totsch 69' | 4,205 | LOU 1–0–0 | |

In the first match after Lexington joined the USL Championship, the event was recognized as an official part of the Kentucky Derby Festival. The name given by supporters was replaced by a formal name (complete with corporate sponsorship) for the series: The Commonwealth Cup presented by Republic Bank.

| Season | Date | Competition | Stadium | Home team | Result | Away team | Goal scorers | Attendance | Series | Ref |
|---|---|---|---|---|---|---|---|---|---|---|
| 2025 | May 1 | USLC; Commonwealth Cup | Lynn Family Stadium | Louisville City FC | 2–0 | Lexington SC | (LOU) Gilbert 68' (o.g.) (LOU) Goodrum 69' | 8,233 | LOU 2–0–0 | |
| 2025 | July 26 | USL Cup; Commonwealth Cup | Lexington SC Stadium | Lexington SC | 1–2 | Louisville City FC | (LEX) Jacob Greene 87' (LOU) Jake Morris 91', 97' | 8,252 | LOU 3–0–0 | |

=== The Green Team Gauntlet/Battle of the Greens (Greenville Triumph SC) ===
This "rivalry" was created by Tyler Crane of Crane Kicks Lex (fan blog/podcast) and Gio Cañas, who is a notable Twitter presence within USL1 Twitter landscape, who now works for the Greenville Triumph SC. On the field, the rivalry has lived up to "hype," featuring late-game thrillers in multiple matches.

LEX win GVL win Draw

| Season | Date | Competition | Stadium | Home team | Result | Away team | Goal Scorers | Attendance | Series | Ref |
|---|---|---|---|---|---|---|---|---|---|---|
| 2023 | April 22 | USL1 | Toyota Stadium (Kentucky) | Lexington SC | 0–2 | Greenville Triumph SC | (GVL) Pilato 37', Castro 90+4' (MacKinnon) | 2,260 | GVL 1–0–0 | |
| 2023 | September 1 | USL1 | Toyota Stadium (Kentucky) | Lexington SC | 1–1 | Greenville Triumph SC | (LEX) Robertson 49' (Mohammed) (GVL) Smith 90+8' | 2,142 | GVL 1–1–0 | |
| 2023 | October 14 | USL1 | Paladin Stadium | Greenville Triumph SC | 1–1 | Lexington SC | (GVL) Smith 82' (o.g.), 90+5' | 3,672 | GVL 1–2–0 | |
| 2024 | Match 29 | USL1 | Toyota Stadium (Kentucky) | Lexington SC | 2–3 | Greenville Triumph SC | (LEX) Cano 45+4' (Diouf)Lancaster 57' (Liadi) Fox 90+8' (o.g.) (GVL) Zakowski 65' (Smith) MacKinnon 84' | 1,672 | GVL 2–2–0 | |
| 2024 | June 29 | USL Cup | Paladin Stadium | Greenville Triumph SC | 0–1 | Lexington SC | (LEX) Diouf 2' | 2,077 | GVL 2–2–1 | |

== Supporters ==
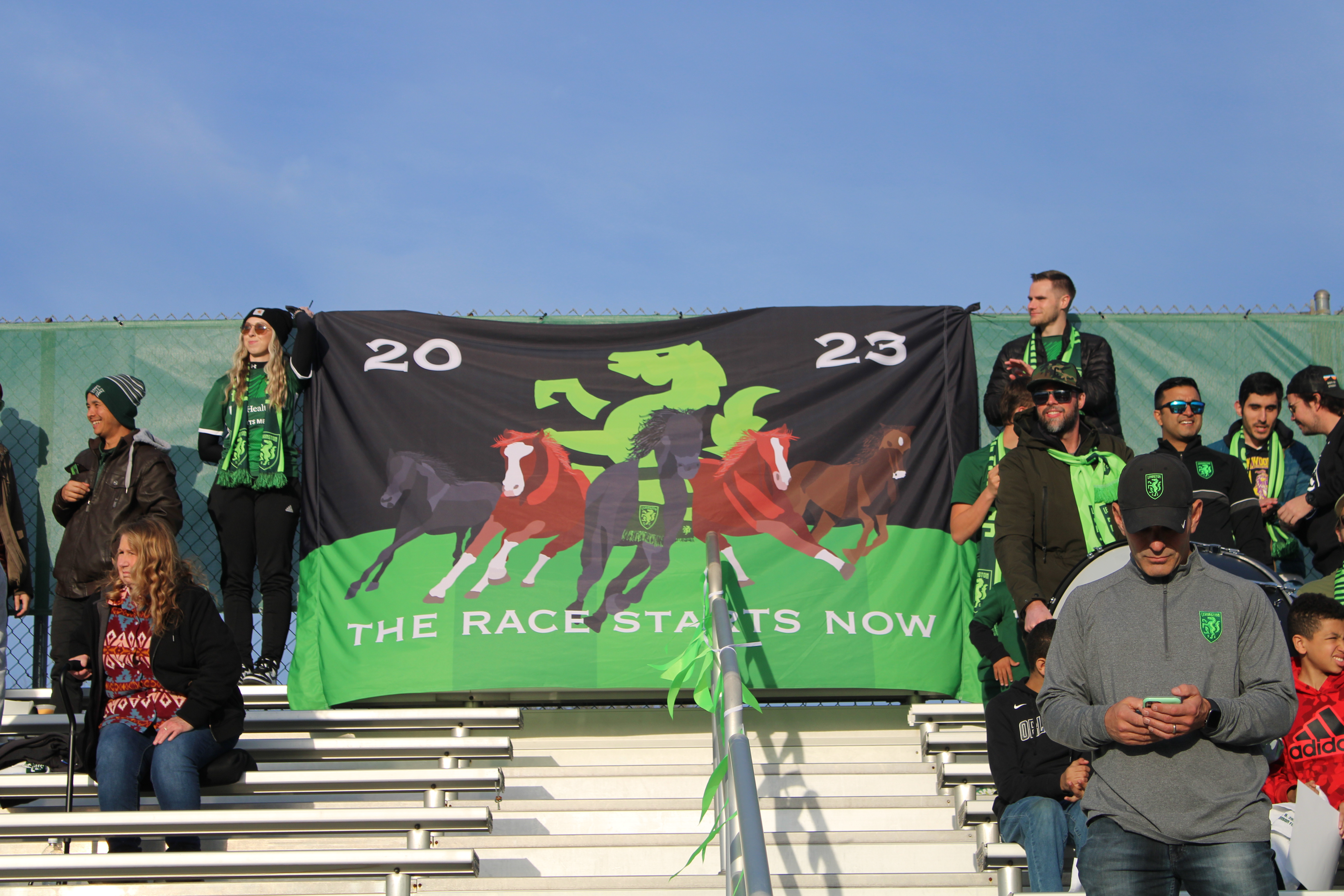
The Railbirds unveil a tifo prior to Lexington's inaugural home match.

The Railbirds are the only official recognized supporter group for Lexington Sporting Club.

Founded in August 2022 by Jesus Robles, Sam Spencer, Jon Lunsford, and Alan Clark, the group takes its name from the horseracing world. A "Railbird" is an enthusiastic person who presses against the fence (or "rail") of a track, cheering passionately to give their horse that final push across the finish line. This unique name perfectly reflects the group's mission to provide persistent, loud support for the club.

== Colors and crest ==
The Lexington Sporting Club logo reflects the culture and heritage of the Bluegrass region as Lexington's official color is green, inspired by the landscape surrounding Lexington and the crest, in the shape of the shield, features prominently a horse, as a nod to Lexington's reputation as the horse racing capital of the world.

=== Design and development ===
The crest was designed by Christopher Payne, a notable designer with experience across soccer clubs in the United Kingdom and the United States, including Eastleigh Football Club, Flower City Union, Monterey Bay FC, and Appalachian FC. Payne worked closely with the Lexington-based media and PR firm, Bullhorn Creative, which managed the project's creative services, messaging, and overall execution beyond the initial brand design.

=== Community-driven themes ===
In an effort to ensure the brand authentically represented its community, LSC leadership conducted an extensive outreach campaign over the course of several months. This included fourteen listening sessions with community members, gathering over 300 responses to brand surveys, and more than 1,500 responses to stadium surveys. These sessions helped identify key themes for the club's identity, such as the cultural landscape of the Bluegrass region and its lush green rolling hills and leafy woodlands, its equine and bourbon industries, and a communal sense of place.

=== The equine connection ===
Often called the "Horse Capital of the World," the city is surrounded by over 400 horse farms and was the first city outside of Europe to host the World Equestrian Games. To honor this heritage, and to reflect the ownership's involvement in the thoroughbred industry, including President Vince Gabbert's professional connection to Keeneland Race Course, the final crest features a vibrant green, stylized horse figure set against a dark green background.

=== Signature typography ===
Adding another layer of local detail, Payne developed a typeface called Lex Type specific for Lexington SC branding. Payne explains the design: "Like a horse, Lex Type is tall, powerful, and athletic. However, if you look closely, you'll notice the typeface has subtle curves at the top and the bottom of the letters. This detail is inspired by the graceful curves of a bourbon barrel, tying the typography to this important element of local history and tradition."

=== Sponsorship ===
As of January 9, 2026

| Seasons | Kit manufacturer | Shirt sponsor |
|---|---|---|
| 2023–24 (USL1) | Nike | UK HealthCare Sports Medicine |
| 2024–25 (USL Super League) | Nike | UK HealthCare Sports Medicine |
| 2023–24 (USLW) | Nike | Badass Coffee of Hawaii |
| 2025 (USLC), 2025–26 (USL Super League) | Hummel | UK HealthCare Sports Medicine |

== Mascot ==
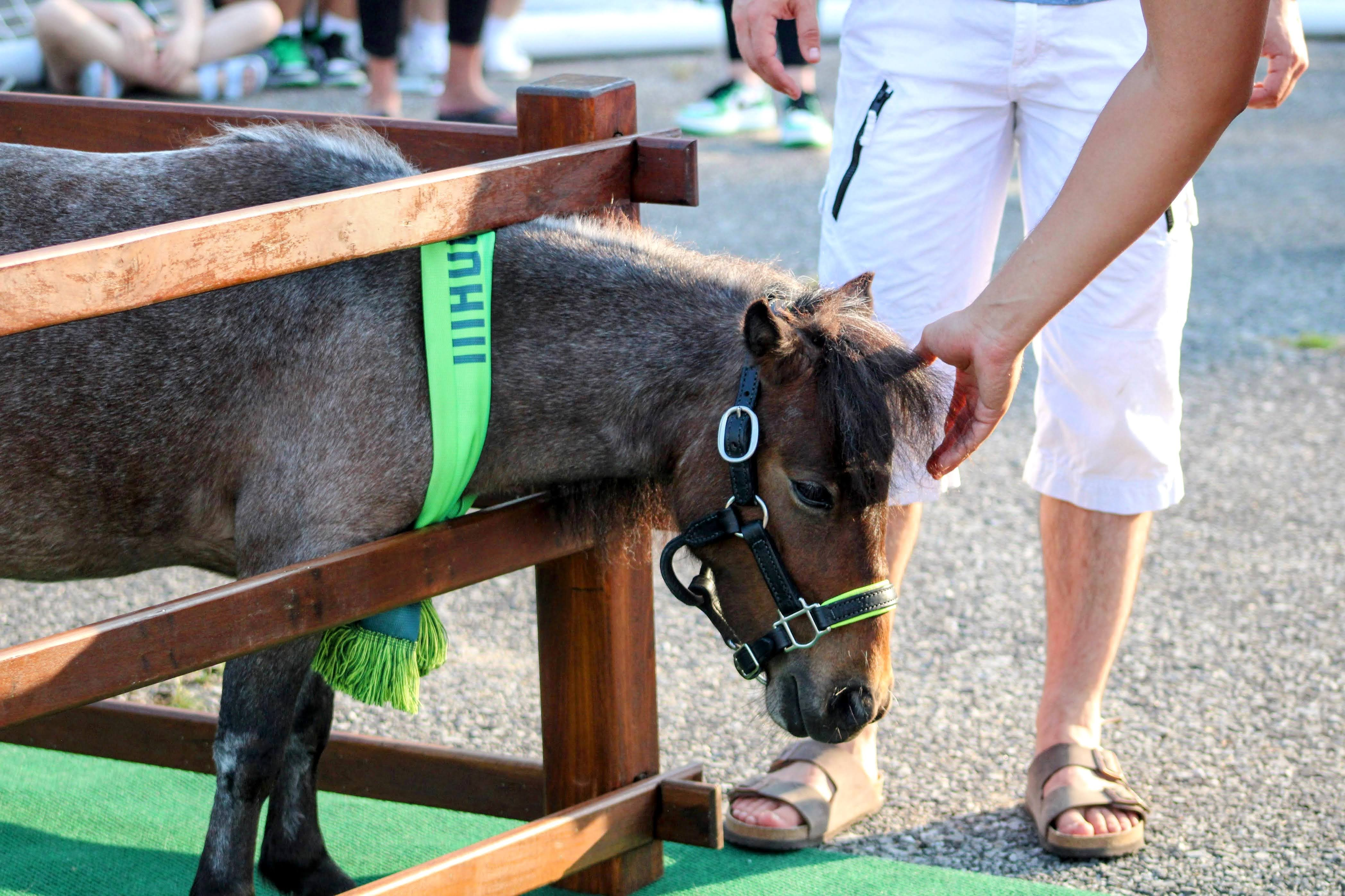
LSC's mini-horse mascot Thunder in her pen at Lexington SC Stadium.

On May 12, 2023, LSC officially introduced their "mini" mascot, Thunder, a miniature therapy horse from Florida. During matches, Thunder is stationed in the southwest corner of the stadium and has become extremely popular with fans, particularly younger attendees. This led to the green horse featured on the club's crest being affectionately nicknamed "Thunder" by the fanbase. The name itself is partly a nod to the AC/DC song "Thunderstruck," a choice that was inspired by fans enjoying the humorous juxtaposition of a heavy rock song playing as the small horse was walked onto the pitch.

== Stadium ==
=== Toyota Stadium (2023–24) ===
Lexington SC played at Toyota Stadium at Georgetown College for their inaugural season and a portion of their second season.

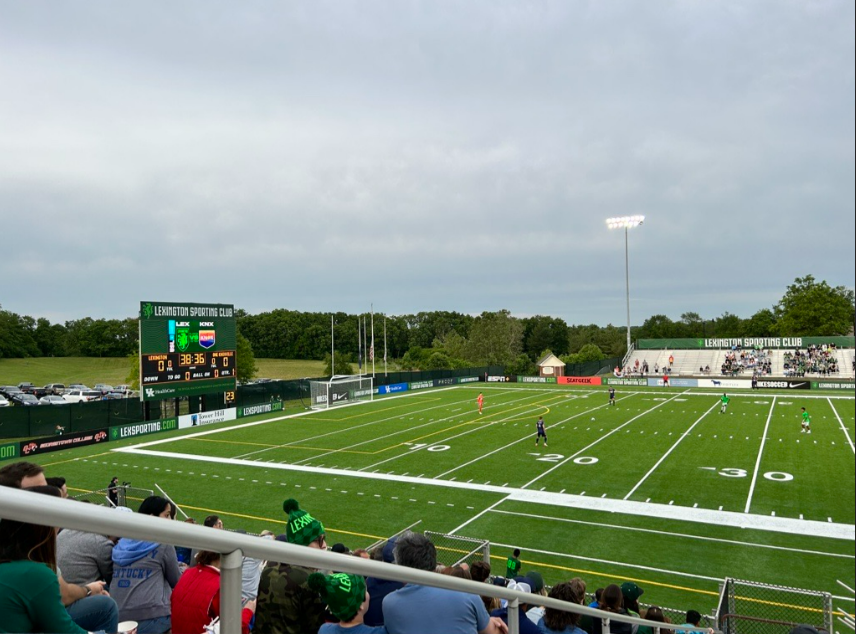
Toyota Stadium in Georgetown, KY during a Lexington SC game against One Knoxville FC.

Proposed downtown stadium

Originally, the team had plans for a downtown stadium as a part of the Lexington Center Corporation's High Street Development Project. The stadium's design was being directed by architecture firm Gensler. The firm is perhaps best known for designing Shanghai Tower, currently the world's third-tallest building by height. The firm is also responsible for designing several other sporting-specific stadiums and entertainment facilities including Milwaukee Bucks Entertainment Blocks (Milwaukee Bucks), BMO Stadium (Los Angeles FC), Q2 Stadium (Austin FC), and BMO Field, Canada's first soccer-specific stadium (Toronto FC). The proposed location for the facility was in the heart of downtown, directly across the street from Central Bank Center and Rupp Arena, a multi-purpose venue which hosts the Kentucky Wildcats men's basketball team, concerts, conventions, and shows. The team eventually withdrew the proposal for the site, which will now be used for other mixed-use development.

=== Lexington SC Stadium (2024–present) ===
Lexington Sporting Club now has a soccer-specific stadium off Athens–Boonesboro Road near Interstate 75, with a capacity of 7,500 that can be expanded up to 11,000 with renovations. Surrounding the stadium are the training grounds for both professional teams, as well as training and playing fields for the youth, academy, and pre-professional teams.

The stadium opened on September 8, 2024, with a USL Super League match between Lexington SC Women and Tampa Bay Sun FC. In the first match played in stadium history, the home team lost 3–2. The men's team also played their inaugual match later that same day, a 1–0 loss to One Knoxville FC in USL League One.

== Lexington SC Academy ==
=== Pathway-to-pro development ===
The development side of the club, Lexington SC Academy, was formed on March 22, 2022, the same day the professional club's branding was revealed. This academy was created through the merger of two local youth soccer clubs: Lexington F.C. and Commonwealth Soccer Club.

In April 2022, the club announced it would join the Girls Academy League to add a girls' youth program later in the fall.

The following week, the club announced its participation in the USL Academy as part of its pro development model for youth players. Their teams play in leagues like Kentucky Premier League (KPL), Kentucky Select Soccer League (KSSL), Great Lakes Conference (GLC), Girls Academy (GA), and more.

=== MLS NEXT expansion ===
On February 28, 2025, in a significant step for the program, it was announced that the U-13-19 top boys teams would join MLS NEXT's new competition tier operated by the National Academy League, where they'd compete in the Great Lakes Division.

== Men and women's rosters ==
=== USL Championship ===
As of August 25, 2026

Note: Flags indicate national team as defined under FIFA eligibility rules; some limited exceptions apply. Players may hold more than one non-FIFA nationality.

| No. | Pos. | Nation | Player |
|---|---|---|---|
| 1 | GK | USA | Logan Ketterer |
| 2 | DF | TTO | Jacob Greene |
| 4 | DF | ESP | Arturo Ordoñez |
| 5 | DF | USA | Kendall Burks |
| 6 | MF | IRL | Aaron Molloy |
| 7 | MF | USA | Marcus Epps |
| 8 | MF | BRA | Nick Firmino |
| 9 | FW | USA | Phillip Goodrum |
| 12 | DF | USA | Xavier Zengue |
| 14 | DF | USA | Andrew Caborn |
| 15 | DF | UGA | Noble Okello |
| 16 | MF | USA | Blaine Ferri |
| 17 | GK | GER | Oliver Semmle |
| 18 | FW | USA | Malik Henry-Scott |

| No. | Pos. | Nation | Player |
|---|---|---|---|
| 19 | FW | JAM | Tarik Scott |
| 20 | FW | GER | Milo Yosef |
| 22 | DF | USA | Joe Hafferty |
| 23 | DF | JAM | Javain Brown |
| 27 | MF | GBS | Braudilio Rodrigues |
| 28 | MF | USA | Mason Kutch |
| 31 | GK | USA | Brooks Thompson |
| 34 | FW | USA | Malcolm Fry (on loan from New England Revolution) |
| 40 | GK | USA | Garrett Addams |
| 77 | FW | USA | Jonathan Lewis |
| 96 | MF | USA | Luis Felipe |
| 98 | DF | USA | Patrick Seagrist |
| 99 | GK | USA | Johan Peñaranda |

==== Out on loan ====
Note: Flags indicate national team as defined under FIFA eligibility rules; some limited exceptions apply. Players may hold more than one non-FIFA nationality.

| No. | Pos. | Nation | Player |
|---|---|---|---|
| 10 | MF | NGR | Michael Adedokun (on loan to Hartford Athletic) |
| 21 | DF | ENG | Marqes Muir (on loan to Greenville Triumph) |

=== Gainbridge Super League ===
As of January 9, 2026

Note: Flags indicate national team as defined under FIFA eligibility rules; some limited exceptions apply. Players may hold more than one non-FIFA nationality.

| No. | Pos. | Nation | Player |
|---|---|---|---|
| 1 | GK | USA | Sarah Cox |
| 2 | FW | USA | Hannah White |
| 3 | DF | USA | Allison Pantuso |
| 4 | DF | USA | Trinity Watson |
| 5 | DF | USA | Maddy Perez |
| 6 | MF | USA | Taylor Aylmer |
| 7 | MF | USA | Justina Gaynor |
| 8 | MF | USA | Natalie Higgins |
| 9 | MF | USA | Amber Nguyen |
| 10 | MF | BIH | Emina Ekic |
| 11 | FW | USA | McKenzie Weinert |

| No. | Pos. | Nation | Player |
|---|---|---|---|
| 12 | DF | USA | Alyssa Bourgeois |
| 13 | FW | USA | Hannah Richardson |
| 15 | FW | USA | Catherine Barry |
| 18 | MF | USA | Addie McCain |
| 19 | DF | USA | Hannah Johnson |
| 21 | DF | USA | Hannah Sharts |
| 25 | MF | USA | Shea Moyer (C) |
| 26 | GK | USA | Kat Asman |
| 28 | MF | USA | Cassie Rohan |
| 35 | FW | USA | Sarah Griffith |

==== Out on loan ====
Note: Flags indicate national team as defined under FIFA eligibility rules; some limited exceptions apply. Players may hold more than one non-FIFA nationality.

| No. | Pos. | Nation | Player |
|---|---|---|---|
| 23 | MF | USA | Nicole Vernis (on loan to Lazio) |
| 20 | FW | ARG | Mariana Larroquette (end of loan from Orlando Pride) |

== LSC leadership and technical staff ==
As of January 9, 2026

Front Office
| President | Vince Gabbert |
| Chief Operating Officer | Kim Shelton |
| Director of Sports Science & Performance | Flavio Grava |
USL Championship Technical Staff
| Men's Sporting Director | Sam Stockley |
| Head Coach | Masaki Hemmi |
| Assistant Coach | Jose Robles |
| Assistant Coach | Kyle Timm |
USL Super League Technical Staff
| Women's Sporting Director | Michelle Reyner |
| Head Coach | Kosuke Kimura |
| Assistant Coach | Maren McCrary |
| Assistant & Goalkeeping Coach | Ben Willis |
| USLW Head Coach | Paul Dolinsky |
USL Academy Technical Staff
| Head Coach & Player Pathway Director | Chris LeFevre |

== Team records ==
=== Year-by-year ===
As of January 9, 2026

| Season | League | | | | | | | | | | | Playoffs | USL Jägermeister Cup | | | | | | | | | | US Open Cup | Top Scorer ^{1} | | Head Coach | Avg. Attendance |
| Season | Div | League | M | W | D | L | GF | GA | GD | Pts | Pos (Western Conf) | Playoffs | M | W | D | L | GF | GA | GD | Pts | Pos | Playoff | US Open Cup | Player | Goals | Head Coach | Avg. Attendance |
|---|---|---|---|---|---|---|---|---|---|---|---|---|---|---|---|---|---|---|---|---|---|---|---|---|---|---|---|
| 2023 | 3 | USL L1 | 32 | 7 | 11 | 14 | 46 | 57 | −11 | 32 | 9th | DNQ | Did not exist until 2024 | | | | | | | | | | R2 | (Senegal) Ates Diouf | 15 | Sam Stockley, Nacho Novo (interim) | 2,232 |
| 2024 | 3 | USL L1 | 22 | 5 | 6 | 11 | 33 | 42 | −9 | 21 | 9th | DNQ | 8 | 3 | 3 | 2 | 10 | 10 | 0 | 13 | 3rd | DNQ | R1 | (England) Cameron Lancaster | 8 | Darren Powell | 1,317 |
| 2025 | 2 | USLC | 30 | 9 | 9 | 12 | 31 | 42 | −11 | 36 | 9th | DNQ | 4 | 1 | 1 | 2 | 6 | 5 | 1 | 4 | 5th | DNQ | R2 | (Ghana) Forster Ajago | 6 | Terry Boss | 4,391 |

1. Top Scorer includes statistics from league matches only.

USL Super League

As of January 9, 2026

| Season | USL Super League | | | | | | | | | | Playoffs | Top Scorer ^{1} | | Head Coach | Avg. Attendance |
| Season | Div | M | W | D | L | GF | GA | GD | Pts | Pos | Playoffs | Player | Goals | Head Coach | Avg. Attendance |
|---|---|---|---|---|---|---|---|---|---|---|---|---|---|---|---|
| 2024–25 | 1 | 18 | 4 | 4 | 10 | 23 | 35 | −12 | 16 | 6th | DNQ | (United States) Madison Parsons | 5 | (United States) Michael Dickey, (England) Sam Stockley (interim) | 1,889 |
| 2025-26 | 1 | 14 | 5 | 9 | 0 | 28 | 13 | 15 | 24 | 2nd | TBD | (United States) Addie McCain (United States) Catherine Barry | 7 | (Japan) Masaki Hemmi (2025), (Japan) Kosuke Kimura (2026) | 2,301 |

USL W-League

As of January 9, 2026

| Season | USL W League | | | | | | | | | Playoffs | Top Scorer ^{1} | | Head Coach |
| Season | M | W | D | L | GF | GA | GD | Pts | Pos | Playoffs | Player | Goals | Head Coach |
|---|---|---|---|---|---|---|---|---|---|---|---|---|---|
| 2023 | 10 | 3 | 1 | 6 | 10 | 17 | −7 | 10 | 3rd | Did not qualify | (United States) Kailey Utley | 4 | (England) Alan Kirkup |
| 2024 | 10 | 4 | 2 | 4 | 23 | 13 | 10 | 14 | 3rd | Did not qualify | (United States) Makala Woods | 6 | (England) Alan Kirkup |
| 2025 | 10 | 3 | 3 | 4 | 19 | 16 | 3 | 12 | 4th | Did not qualify | (United States) Natalie Mitchell | 8 | (United States) Paul Dolinsky |

1. Top Scorer includes statistics from league matches only.

== Head coaches ==
=== Year-by-year ===
==== USL Championship ====
| Coach | Nationality | Start | End | Games | Win | Draw | Loss | Win % |
|---|---|---|---|---|---|---|---|---|
| Terry Boss | (United States) | December 4, 2024 | December 8, 2025 | 30 | 9 | 9 | 12 | 40 |
| Masaki Hemmi | (Japan) | December 20, 2025 | Present | 0 | 0 | 0 | 0 | 0 |

USL League One

| Coach | Nationality | Start | End | Games | Win | Draw | Loss | Win % |
|---|---|---|---|---|---|---|---|---|
| Sam Stockley | (England) | October 13, 2022 | September 17, 2023 | 28 | 7 | 8 | 13 | 39 |
| Nacho Novo (interim) | (Spain) | September 17, 2023 | October 23, 2023 | 5 | 0 | 2 | 3 | 0 |
| Darren Powell | (England) | November 10, 2023 | October 28, 2024 | 24 | 6 | 8 | 10 | 42 |

USL Super League

| Coach | Nationality | Start | End | Games | Win | Draw | Loss | Win % |
|---|---|---|---|---|---|---|---|---|
| Michael Dickey | (United States) | January 9, 2024 | February 21, 2025 | 2 | 3 | 3 | 9 | 30 |
| Sam Stockley (interim) | (England) | March 1, 2025 | July 1, 2025 | 2 | 1 | 1 | 0 | 50 |
| Masaki Hemmi | (Japan) | July 3, 2025 | December 20, 2025 | 14 | 5 | 9 | 0 | 36 |
| Kosuke Kimura | (Japan) | December 20, 2025 | Present | 0 | 0 | 0 | 0 | 0 |

USL W League

| Coach | Nationality | Start | End | Games | Win | Draw | Loss | Win % |
|---|---|---|---|---|---|---|---|---|
| Alan Kirkup | (England) | October 18, 2022 | June 29, 2024 | 20 | 7 | 3 | 10 | 43 |
| Paul Dolinsky | (United States) | September 19, 2024 | Present | 10 | 3 | 3 | 4 | 30 |

== League honors ==
USL League One

2024

USL League One

- Team of the Week
  - Amal Knight – Week 1, 2
  - Jorge Corrales – Week 1, 4
  - Yannick Yankam – Week 1, 2, 6, 17
  - Cameron Lancaster – Week 4, 17
  - Azaad Liadi – Week 6
  - Khalid Balogun – Week 10
  - Nico Brown – Week 12
  - Ates Diouf – Week 14, 17
  - Alexis Cerritos – Week 17
  - Darren Powell – Coach of the Week 17
- Coach of the Month
  - Darren Powell – August

USL Jägermeister Cup

- Team of the Round
  - Amal Knight – Round 1, 5
  - Jorge Corrales – Round 1, 7
  - Kaelon Fox – Round 1
  - Ates Diouf – Round 3
  - Jayden Onen – Round 3
  - Cameron Lancaster – Round 3, 8
  - Amal Knight – Round 7
  - Christian Lue Young – Round 8
  - Alexis Cerritos – Round 8
  - Darren Powell – Coach of Round 1, 5
- Save of the Round
  - Amal Knight – Round 6
2023
- All League First Team - Ates Diouf
- Seasonal Honors
  - Player of the Month
    - Ates Diouf – September 2023
  - Player of the Week
    - Owen Green – Week 5
    - Amal Knight – Week 9
    - Ates Diouf – Week 12 & 21
    - Tate Robertson – Week 14
  - Team of the Week
    - Kaelon Fox – Week 1, 12, 21, & 23
    - Khalid Balogun – Week 3 & 9
    - Terique Mohammed – Week 4, 9, 19, & 25
    - Owen Green – Week 5 & 14
    - Nico Brown – Week 5 & 15
    - Amal Knight – Week 9, 13, 19, & 25
    - Tate Robertson – Week 11, 14, 21, 22, 25, & 27
    - Ates Diouf – Week 12, 13, 14, 17, 18, 19, 21, 26, 28, & 29
    - Cesar Murillo Jr. – Week 13
    - Will Baynham – Week 14
    - Don Smart – Week 14
    - Pierre Mané – Week 27
    - Kimball Jackson – Week 29
    - Austin Causey – Week 31
  - Goal of the Week
    - Tate Robertson – Week 25
  - Save of the Week
    - Amal Knight – Week 11, 14, 17, 19, 21, 23, 25, & 26

USL Super League

2024–25
Team of the Month
- Cori Sullivan – August

USL W League

2024
Team of the Month
- Katelyn Fishnick – May

== Other honors ==
USLPA

2023

Young Player of the Year – Ates Diouf

Players' Choice Best XI – Ates Diouf and Tate Robertson

Crane Kicks Lex (LSC fan votes)

2023

Tekkers Player of the Year – Tate Robertson

Young Player of the Year – Kimball Jackson

Defender of the Year – Amal Knight

Midfielder of the Year – Don Smart

Forward of the Year – Ates Diouf

Heart and Soul Player of the Year – Austin Causey

Player of the Year – Ates Diouf

'The Railbirds' (Supporters Group)

Golden Horseshoe

2023 USL1 Player of the Year – Charlie Machell

2024 USLW Player of the Year – Makala Woods
