= 2023 Oakland Roots SC season =

Oakland Roots SC
2023 season
- Chairman: Steven Aldrich
- Head coach: Noah Delgado
- Stadium: Pioneer Stadium
- USLC: Western Conference: 10th
- USLC Playoffs: DNQ
- U.S. Open Cup: Third round
Home colors	Away colors

The 2023 Oakland Roots SC season was the club's fifth season of existence and fourth in the USL Championship.

During the offseason, the Roots moved from their first home at Laney College Football Stadium in Oakland to Pioneer Stadium on the campus of CSU East Bay in Hayward due to issues with Laney College's stadium having major issues with the artificial turf.

== Squad Information ==
=== Roster ===
As of July 27, 2023

No.	Pos.	Nation	Player
2	DF	GAM	Baboucarr Njie
3	DF	SLE	Kevin Wright
4	MF	CMR	Joseph Nane
6	DF	USA	Tarek Morad
7	MF	LES	Napo Matsoso
8	MF	BDI	Irakoze Donasiyano
10	MF	RSA	Lindo Mfeka
11	MF	JAM	Trayvone Reid
13	DF	TRI	Neveal Hackshaw
14	DF	USA	Danny Barbir
15	MF	USA	Daniel Gomez
16	MF	USA	Ryan Her
17	FW	USA	Johnny Rodriguez
18	FW	COL	Anuar Peláez
19	MF	USA	Wolfgang Prentice
20	GK	USA	Paul Blanchette
21	DF	MNE	Emrah Klimenta
22	MF	ECU	Jeciel Cedeño
23	MF	USA	Memo Diaz
30	DF	SLV	Bryan Tamacas
34	DF	FRA	Thomas Camier
38	FW	USA	Etsgar Cruz
39	MF	USA	Javier Bedolla-Vera
47	GK	USA	Taylor Bailey
50	DF	USA	Damario McIntosh
61	GK	USA	Edwin Rodriguez
62	GK	USA	Adan Corona
99	MF	USA	Drew Murray

== Competitions ==
=== USL Championship ===
Pos	Team	Pld	W	L	T	GF	GA	GD	Pts	Qualification
8	New Mexico United	34	13	14	7	51	49	+2	46	Playoffs
9	Rio Grande Valley FC Toros	34	10	11	13	43	48	−5	43	
10	Oakland Roots SC	34	11	14	9	45	48	−3	42	
11	Monterey Bay FC	34	11	15	8	42	53	−11	41	
12	Las Vegas Lights FC	34	3	21	10	36	66	−30	19	

Source: USL Championship Standings
Rules for classification: 1) head-to-head points; 2) head-to-head goal differential; 3) points-per game within conference; 4) total wins; 5) total goal differential; 6) total goals scored; 7) points earned against top four Conference finishers; 8) disciplinary points; 9) coin toss or drawing of lots

==== Match results ====
On January 9, 2023, the USL Championship released the regular season schedule for all teams.

All times are in Pacific Standard Time.

March 11 1	San Antonio FC	3–1	Oakland Roots	San Antonio, TX
5:30 PM	Hansen 12'; Batista 45+2', 73'	Report	Diaz 58'	Stadium: Toyota Field; Attendance: 8,106; Referee: Matthew Thompson

March 19 2	Rio Grande Valley FC Toros	1–1	Oakland Roots	Edinburg, TX
5:00 PM	Ricketts 14'	Report	Rodriguez 82'	Stadium: H-E-B Park; Attendance: 3,460; Referee: Malik Badawi

April 1 3	Oakland Roots	1–0	New Mexico United	Hayward, CA
5:00 PM	Rodriguez 63'	Report	Portillo (yellow card) 51' (yellow-red card) 71'	Stadium: Pioneer Stadium; Attendance: 4,695; Referee: Elijio Arreguin

April 8 4	Indy Eleven	0–3	Oakland Roots	Indianapolis, IN
4:00 PM		Report	Klimenta (yellow card) 23' (yellow-red card) 82'; Mfeka 43'; Formella 71'; Rito 78'	Stadium: Michael A. Carroll Stadium; Attendance: 9,334; Referee: Matthew Thompson

April 15 5	Oakland Roots	1–2	Hartford Athletic	Hayward, CA
7:00 PM	Formella 73' (pen.)	Report	Saydee 31'; Cedeno 35'	Stadium: Pioneer Stadium; Attendance: 4,036; Referee: Matthew Corrigan

April 23 6	Loudoun United FC	2–0	Oakland Roots	Leesburg, VA
1:00 PM	Ryan 30' (pen.); Armenakas 58'	Report		Stadium: Segra Field; Attendance: 2,061; Referee: Cristian Campo Hernández

April 29 7	Oakland Roots	0–0	Miami FC	Hayward, CA
7:00 PM		Report		Stadium: Pioneer Stadium; Attendance: 4,540; Referee: Ricardo Fierro

May 6 8	Birmingham Legion FC	1–4	Oakland Roots	Birmingham, AL
4:30 PM	Kavita (yellow card) (yellow-red card) 35'; Martínez 48'	Report	Formella 45+3' (pen.); Mfeka 64'; Reid 71'; Rodriguez 88'	Stadium: Protective Stadium; Attendance: 4,186; Referee: Sergii Boiko

May 13 9	Oakland Roots	3–0	Orange County SC	Hayward, CA
8:00 PM	Formella 30'; Morad 43'; Rito 78'	Report		Stadium: Pioneer Stadium; Attendance: 5,855; Referee: Corbyn May

May 20 10	Sacramento Republic FC	3–1	Oakland Roots	Sacramento, CA
7:00 PM	Keko 12'; Cicerone 51'; Herrera 55'	Report	Barbir 62'	Stadium: Heart Health Park; Attendance: 10,988; Referee: Elton García

May 27 11	Oakland Roots	2–0	San Diego Loyal SC	Hayward, CA
8:00 PM	Rodriguez 7'; Peláez 90+5'	Report		Stadium: Pioneer Stadium; Attendance: 3,584; Referee: Calin Radosav

June 2 12	Colorado Springs Switchbacks FC	0–1	Oakland Roots	Colorado Springs, CO
6:00 PM		Report	Rodriguez 12'	Stadium: Weidner Field; Attendance: 8,023; Referee: Ricardo Fierro

June 10 13	Phoenix Rising FC	2–2	Oakland Roots	Phoenix, AZ
7:30 PM	Varela 58'; Arteaga 89'	Report	Formella 9'; Mfeka 66'	Stadium: Phoenix Rising Soccer Stadium; Attendance: 5,748; Referee: Malik Badawi

June 17 14	Oakland Roots	0–0	Pittsburgh Riverhounds SC	Hayward, CA
7:00 PM		Report		Stadium: Pioneer Stadium; Attendance: 3,446; Referee: Alexis Da Silva

June 24 15	Oakland Roots	1–1	Phoenix Rising FC	Hayward, CA
7:00 PM	Formella 82'	Report	Arteaga 90+3'	Stadium: Pioneer Stadium; Attendance: 3,002; Referee: Abdou Ndiaye

June 28 16	Oakland Roots	0–2	Rio Grande Valley FC Toros	Hayward, CA
7:00 PM	Diaz (yellow card) 90' (yellow-red card) 90+2'	Report	Cabrera 72', 80'	Stadium: Pioneer Stadium; Attendance: 2,838; Referee: Deshun Beard

July 8 17	Tampa Bay Rowdies	3–0	Oakland Roots	St. Petersburg, FL
4:30 PM	Jennings 8', 41', 58'	Report		Stadium: Al Lang Stadium; Referee: Natalie Simon

July 12 18	Oakland Roots	1–1	Memphis 901 FC	Hayward, CA
7:00 PM	Cedeno 33'; Hackshaw (red card) 90+8'	Report	Kissiedou 61'	Stadium: Pioneer Stadium; Attendance: 2,098; Referee: Ricardo Fierro

July 15 19	Monterey Bay FC	1–3	Oakland Roots	Seaside, CA
7:00 PM	Dixon 29'	Report	Rodriguez 15' (pen.), 33'; Diaz 78'	Stadium: Cardinale Stadium; Attendance: 5,046; Referee: Elijio Arreguin

July 22 20	El Paso Locomotive FC	1–3	Oakland Roots	El Paso, TX
7:00 PM	Petrovic 48'	Report	Mfeka 65'; Rodriguez 69'; Peláez 85'	Stadium: Southwest University Park; Attendance: 6,795; Referee: Eric Tattersall

July 26 21	Oakland Roots	1–0	Las Vegas Lights FC	Hayward, CA
7:00 PM	Peláez 76'	Report		Stadium: Pioneer Stadium; Attendance: 2,356; Referee: Adorae Monroy

July 29 22	Oakland Roots	1–1	Detroit City FC	Hayward, CA
7:00 PM	Rodriguez 1'	Report	Carroll 5'	Stadium: Pioneer Stadium; Attendance: 2,586; Referee: Brad Jensen

August 4 23	Charleston Battery	0–1	Oakland Roots	Mount Pleasant, SC
4:30 PM		Report	Dodson 41' (o.g.)	Stadium: Patriots Point Soccer Complex; Attendance: 2,487; Referee: John Griggs

August 19 24	Oakland Roots	2–3	Colorado Springs Switchbacks FC	Hayward, CA
7:00 PM	Diaz 25'; Peláez 45+5' (pen.)	Report	Foster 5'; Magee 40', 58'	Stadium: Pioneer Stadium; Attendance: 4,017; Referee: Alexis Da Silva

August 23 25	New Mexico United	1–2	Oakland Roots	Albuquerque, NM
6:00 PM	Rivas 90+2'	Report	Peláez 42'; Reid 52'	Stadium: Isotopes Park; Attendance: 7,081; Referee: Joshua Encarnación

August 26 26	Louisville City FC	2–1	Oakland Roots	Louisville, KY
4:30 PM	Ownby 71'; Jimenez 90+8'	Report	Rodriguez 45+6'	Stadium: Lynn Family Stadium; Attendance: 10,584; Referee: Abdou Ndiaye

September 2 27	Oakland Roots	0–1	Sacramento Republic FC	Hayward, CA
7:00 PM		Report	Herrera 3' (pen.)	Stadium: Pioneer Stadium; Attendance: 4,140; Referee: Matthew Thompson

September 9 28	Las Vegas Lights FC	3–1	Oakland Roots	Las Vegas, NV
7:30 PM	Gonzalez 56'; Bagley 57', 89'	Report	Rodriguez 12' (pen.)	Stadium: Cashman Field; Referee: Danielle Chesky

September 16 29	Oakland Roots	0–1	FC Tulsa	Hayward, CA
7:00 PM	Mfeka (yellow card) 35' (yellow-red card) 44'	Report	Goodrum 10'; Epps (red card) 79'	Stadium: Pioneer Stadium; Attendance: 3,639; Referee: Melvin Rivas

September 23 30	Oakland Roots	2–2	Monterey Bay FC	Hayward, CA
7:00 PM	Barbir 44'; Hackshaw 90'	Report	Dixon 3'; Okoli 64'	Stadium: Pioneer Stadium; Attendance: 4,099; Referee: John Griggs

September 30 31	Oakland Roots	2–2	San Antonio FC	Hayward, CA
7:00 PM	Rodriguez 9'; Peláez 10'	Report	Patino 55'; Oluwaseyi 90+5'; Farr (red card) 90+10'	Stadium: Pioneer Stadium; Attendance: 5,005; Referee: Brad Jensen

October 4 32	Orange County SC	3–1	Oakland Roots	Irvine, CA
7:00 PM	M. Iloski 45+2' (pen.); Amang 45+5'; B. Iloski 50'	Report	Peláez 11'	Stadium: Championship Soccer Stadium; Attendance: 3,378; Referee: Elvis Osmanovic

October 7 33	San Diego Loyal SC	4–2	Oakland Roots	San Diego, CA
7:00 PM	Corona 17'; Damus 19', 25'; Perez 44'	Report	Tamacas 13'; Klimenta 82'	Stadium: Torero Stadium; Attendance: 5,671; Referee: Danielle Chesky

October 14 34	Oakland Roots	1–2	El Paso Locomotive FC	Hayward, CA
7:00 PM	Peláez 47'; Diaz (yellow card) 65' (yellow-red card) 90+2'	Report	Sonupe 7'; Dollenmayer 14'	Stadium: Pioneer Stadium; Attendance: 6,135; Referee: Abdou Ndiaye

=== U.S. Open Cup ===
As a member of the USL Championship, the Oakland Roots entered the U.S. Open Cup in the second round at home against amateur soccer club El Farolito SC. After winning 3–1, the Roots eventually lost to fellow Championship club Sacramento Republic FC in the third round.

April 4	Oakland Roots SC (USLC) (California)	3–1	(California) El Farolito SC (NPSL)	Hayward, California
7:00 PM PDT	Rodriguez 12'; Prentice 19', 24'	Report	Delgado 45' (pen.)	Stadium: Pioneer Stadium; Attendance: 875; Referee: Christopher Calderon

April 26	Sacramento Republic FC (USLC) (California)	1–0	(California) Oakland Roots SC (USLC)	Sacramento, California
7:00 PM PDT	Ross 49'	Report		Stadium: Heart Health Park; Attendance: 4,379; Referee: Laura Rodriguez
