= 2024 Oakland Roots SC season =

Oakland Roots SC
2024 season
- Chairman: Steven Aldrich
- Head coach: Noah Delgado (until April 28); Gavin Glinton (Interim, since April 28)
- Stadium: Pioneer Stadium
- USLC: Western Conference: 7th
- USL Cup: Round of 16
- U.S. Open Cup: Round of 32

The 2024 Oakland Roots SC season was the club's sixth season of existence and fourth in the USL Championship.

The Roots experienced a coaching change in the middle of the season, with former head coach Noah Delgado parting ways with the club on April 28 after a 2-5-1 start to the season, being replaced by current and interim head coach Gavin Glinton, who was the head assistant coach.

== Squad Information ==
=== Roster ===
As of July 28, 2024

Note: Flags indicate national team as defined under FIFA eligibility rules; some limited exceptions apply. Players may hold more than one non-FIFA nationality.

No.	Pos.	Nation	Player
2	DF	GAM	Baboucarr Njie
3	DF	NIR	Niall Logue
4	DF	GEO	Gagi Margvelashvili
5	DF	USA	Camden Riley
6	MF	USA	Daniel Gómez
7	MF	LES	Napo Matsoso
8	MF	BDI	Irakoze Donasiyano
9	FW	USA	Dom Dwyer
10	FW	RSA	Lindo Mfeka
11	FW	JAM	Trayvone Reid
14	DF	USA	Justin Rasmussen
15	DF	TRI	Neveal Hackshaw
17	FW	USA	Johnny Rodriguez
20	GK	USA	Paul Blanchette
21	DF	SLV	Bryan Tamacas
22	MF	ECU	Jeciel Cedeno

No.	Pos.	Nation	Player
23	DF	USA	Memo Diaz
27	FW	HAI	Miche-Naider Chéry
38	MF	USA	Etsgar Cruz
39	MF	USA	Javier Bedolla-Vera
40	DF	USA	Ilya Alekseev
41	MF	USA	Eli Wachs
45	MF	USA	Ali Elmasnaouy
46	MF	USA	Kieran Bracken
47	DF	USA	Julio Martinez
48	FW	USA	Luis Saldana
49	DF	USA	Tomas Caminos
50	DF	FRA	Thomas Camier
52	MF	USA	Juan Sanchez
60	GK	USA	Timothy Syrel
61	GK	USA	Edwin Rodriguez
65	DF	USA	Matteo Carbone

== Competitions ==
=== USL Championship ===
Pos	Team	Pld	W	L	T	GF	GA	GD	Pts	Qualification
5	Sacramento Republic FC	34	13	11	10	46	34	+12	49	Playoffs
6	Orange County SC	34	13	14	7	38	45	−7	46	Playoffs
7	Oakland Roots SC	34	13	16	5	37	57	−20	44	Playoffs
8	Phoenix Rising FC	34	11	14	9	33	39	−6	42	Playoffs
9	San Antonio FC	34	10	15	9	36	49	−13	39	

Source: USL Championship Standings
Rules for classification: 1) head-to-head points; 2) head-to-head goal differential; 3) points-per game within conference; 4) total wins; 5) total goal differential; 6) total goals scored; 7) points earned against top four Conference finishers; 8) disciplinary points; 9) coin toss or drawing of lots

==== Match results ====
On December 18, 2023, the USL Championship released the regular season schedule for all 24 teams.

All times are in Pacific Standard Time.

March 9 1	Oakland Roots	2–1	Indy Eleven	Hayward, CA
7:00 PM	Cedeno 3'; Tamacas 50'; Njiel (yellow card) 89'; Donasiyano (yellow card) 98'	Report	Blake (yellow card) 24', (goal) 43'; Guenzatti (yellow card) 24'; Henderlong (yellow card) 25'; Chapman-Page (yellow card) 41'; Collier (yellow card) 70'; Lindley (yellow card) 98'	Stadium: Pioneer Stadium; Attendance: 5,146; Referee: Elton Garcia

March 16 2	Oakland Roots SC	1–1	Charleston Battery	Hayward, California
7:00 PM	Tamacas (yellow card) 6'; Rodriguez (yellow card) 43'; Alekseev 49'; Chéry (yellow card) 66'	Report	Palma (yellow card) 15'; Markanich 35' (yellow card) 77'; Torres (yellow card) 63'; Molloy (yellow card) 90+5'; Grinwis (yellow card) 90+5'	Stadium: Pioneer Stadium; Attendance: 4,261; Referee: Ricardo Fierro

March 23 3	Phoenix Rising FC	1–0	Oakland Roots SC	Phoenix, Arizona
6:00 PM	Armenakas 49'; Zambrano (yellow card) 51'; Traore (yellow card) 61'; Hernández (yellow card) 67'; Stone (yellow card) 90'	PHX Report; OAK Report	Blanchette (yellow card) 38'; Margvelashvili (yellow card) 45'; Riley (yellow card) 54'; Diaz (yellow card) 73'; Cruz (yellow card) 90+8'	Stadium: Phoenix Rising Soccer Stadium; Attendance: 6,036; Referee: Matt Thompson

March 30 4	Oakland Roots SC	0–3	Las Vegas Lights FC	Hayward, California
7:00 PM	Nije (yellow card) 20'	Report	Klimenta (yellow card) 30'; Gannon 46'; Samake 50'; Azcona (yellow card) 63'; Noël 66' (yellow card) 69'; Smart (yellow card) 76'; Nigro (yellow card) 90+2'	Stadium: Pioneer Stadium; Attendance: 2,812; Referee: Matthew Corrigan

April 6 5	Oakland Roots	0–1	Monterey Bay FC	Hayward, California
7:00 PM		Report	Boone 86'	Stadium: Pioneer Stadium; Attendance: 3,001; Referee: Gerald Flores

April 13 6	El Paso Locomotive FC	2–3	Oakland Roots SC	El Paso, Texas
6:00 PM	Moreno 13'; Dhillon 43' (pen.); Rose (yellow card) 49'; Stauffer (yellow card) 64'	Report	Logue 31'; Rodriguez 47' 51' (pen.)	Stadium: Southwest University Park; Attendance: 6,667; Referee: Sergii Demianchuk

April 20 7	Detroit City FC	3–1	Oakland Roots SC	Hamtramack, Michigan
4:00 PM	Morris 8'; Bryant (yellow card) 19'; Diop (yellow card) 20'; Rodriguez 27' (pen.); Bezerra 51'	Report	Diaz (yellow card) 25'; Margvelashvili (yellow card) 39' (yellow-red card) 60'; Rasmussen 57'	Stadium: Keyworth Stadium; Attendance: 5,620; Referee: Olvin Oliva

April 27 8	Oakland Roots SC	0–2	Colorado Springs Switchbacks FC	Hayward, California
7:00 PM	Rasmussen (yellow card) 52'; Riley (yellow card) 83'	Report	Zandi (yellow card) 22'; Tejada 71'; Lacroix (yellow card) 73'; Rocha 84'; Henríquez (yellow card) 90+1'	Stadium: Pioneer Stadium; Attendance: 3,430; Referee: Alexis Da Silva

May 4 9	San Antonio FC	2–2	Oakland Roots SC	San Antonio, Texas
5:30 p.m.	Chol (yellow card) 30'; Omar (yellow card) 55'; Agudelo 73'; Lambert 79', (yellow card) 82'; Sisniega (yellow card) 83'	Report	Cruz (yellow card) 42'; Chéry 65'; Reid (yellow card) 68'; Njie (yellow card) 76'; Rodriguez 84' (pen.)	Stadium: Toyota Field; Attendance: 7,437; Referee: Joshua Encarnación

May 11 10	New Mexico United	2–1	Oakland Roots SC	Albuquerque, New Mexico
6:00 PM	Hurst 2'; Mohamed (yellow card) 28'; Maples (yellow card) 45+2'; Akale 74'	Report	Hackshaw 47' (yellow card) 73'	Stadium: Isotopes Park; Attendance: 11,568; Referee: Brandon Stevis

May 18 11	Oakland Roots SC	2–1	Orange County SC	Hayward, California
7:00 PM	Reid 31' (pen.), (yellow card) 43'; Margvelashvili 90+4'	Report	Amang 21'; Scott (yellow card) 55'; Zubak (yellow card) 67'; Lee (yellow card) 88'	Stadium: Pioneer Stadium; Attendance: 3,651; Referee: Servando Berna Rico

May 24 12	FC Tulsa	0–1	Oakland Roots SC	Tulsa, Oklahoma
7:30 PM CDT	Goodrum (yellow card) 45+3'; Dalou (yellow card) 83'	Report	Chéry 20'; Matsoso (yellow card) 38'; Riley (yellow card) 69'; Diaz (yellow card) 90+5'; Blanchette (yellow card) 90+5'	Stadium: ONEOK Field; Attendance: 3,642; Referee: Muhammad Hassan

June 1 13	Colorado Springs Switchbacks FC	1–0	Oakland Roots SC	Colorado Springs, Colorado
6:00 P.M.	Pierre 2'; Damus (yellow card) 27'	Report	Margvelashvili (yellow card) 42'; Diaz (yellow card) 57'	Stadium: Weidner Field; Attendance: 7,366; Referee: Joe Surgan

June 8 14	Oakland Roots SC	1–0	Tampa Bay Rowdies	Hayward, California
7:00 PM	Cedeno 72'; Dwyer (yellow card) 83'; Nije (penalty missed) 90'+6	Report		Stadium: Pioneer Stadium; Attendance: 6,408; Referee: Elijio Arreguin

June 15 15	Sacramento Republic FC	2–3	Oakland Roots SC	Sacramento, California
8:00 PM	Mazzola (yellow card) 75'; Portillo (yellow card) 75'; Amann 79' 90+2'; Donovan (yellow card) 90+5'	Report	Mfeka 19' 48'; Margvelashvili (yellow card) 31'; Syrel (yellow card) 33'; Diaz (yellow card) 36'; Reid (yellow card) 62'; Cedeno 65'; Rasmussen (yellow card) 70'; Dwyer (yellow card) 90+8'	Stadium: Heart Health Park; Attendance: 10,843; Referee: Sergii Demianchuk

June 19 16	Oakland Roots SC	2–1	El Paso Locomotive FC	Hayward, California
7:00 PM	Riley (yellow card) 19'; Njie (yellow card) 38'; Matsoso 45'; Alekseev 72'	Report	Dhillon 5' (yellow card) 42'; Borelli (yellow card) 34'; Lyons (yellow card) 45+1'; Nevárez (yellow card) 90'	Stadium: Pioneer Stadium; Attendance: 3,247; Referee: Trevor Wiseman

June 22 17	Monterey Bay FC	2–1	Oakland Roots	Seaside, California
7:00 PM	Trager 30'; Dixon (yellow card) 34' (goal) 48'; Baca (yellow card) 90+2' (yellow-red card) 90+5'	Report	Diaz (yellow card) 12'; Donasiyano (yellow card) 41' (yellow-red card) 84'; Hackshaw (yellow card) 52'; Rodriguez 64'	Stadium: Cardinale Stadium; Attendance: 4,330; Referee: Ricardo Montero

June 29 18	Orange County SC	0–2	Oakland Roots SC	Irvine, California
7:00 PM	Chattha (yellow card) 32'; Shutler (yellow card) 34'; Scott (yellow card) 74'; Amang (yellow card) 87'	Report	Riley 15'; Njie (yellow card) 23'; Rodriguez 79'; Dwyer (yellow card) 90'	Stadium: Championship Soccer Stadium; Attendance: 5,000; Referee: Elton García

July 6 19	Oakland Roots SC	1–0	Louisville City FC	Hayward, California
7:00 PM	Matsoso (yellow card) 23'; Rodriguez 62'; Chéry (yellow card) 70'; Cedeño (yellow card) 88'; Dwyer (yellow card) 90+3'	Report	Totsch (yellow card) 60'; Davila (yellow card) 68'; Moguel (yellow card) 90+1'	Stadium: Pioneer Stadium; Attendance: 2,631; Referee: Calin Radosav; Assistant referees: CJ Koll; Andrew Hanks; Fourth official: Robert Vincze

July 13 20	Pittsburgh Riverhounds SC	5–0	Oakland Roots SC	Pittsburgh, PA
4:00 PM	Etou 12' 69'; Mertz 30' (pen.); Suber (yellow card) 45'; Osumanu (yellow card) 49'; Forbes 51'; Biasi (yellow card) 85'	Report	Tamacas (yellow card) 26'; Blanchette (yellow card) 28'; Nijie (yellow card) 47'	Stadium: Highmark Stadium; Attendance: 4,936; Referee: Nabil Bensalah

July 21 21	Oakland Roots SC	2–5	Sacramento Republic FC	Hayward, California
1:00 PM	Rodriguez (yellow card) 31' (goal) 55', 71'; Riley (yellow card) 53'; Gómez (yellow card) 73'	Report	Phillips 5', 46'; Wiedt 27' (yellow card) 32'; Fernandes (yellow card) 39'; Ross 45'; Sanchez (yellow card) 73'; Amann 85'; Ricketts (yellow card) 90+1'	Stadium: Pioneer Stadium; Attendance: 5,446; Referee: Abdou Ndiaye

July 27 22	Miami FC	1–2	Oakland Roots	Miami, Florida
4:00 PM	Palacios (yellow card) 52'; López 75'	Report	Margvelashvili (yellow card) 19'; Diaz 38'; Dwyer (yellow card) 56'; Rodriguez 68'; Reid (yellow card) 82'; Matsoso (yellow card) 88'	Stadium: FIU Stadium; Attendance: 1,041; Referee: Thomas Snyder

August 10 23	Oakland Roots SC	3–1	Loudoun United FC	Hayward, California
7:00 PM	Nije 24'; Rodriguez 62'; Reid 81'	Report	ElMedkhar 54'; Dambrot (yellow card) 77'; Ryan (yellow card) 81'	Stadium: Pioneer Stadium; Attendance: 3,516; Referee: Greg Dopka

August 17 24	Rhode Island FC	1–1	Oakland Roots SC	Smithfield, Rhode Island
4:30PM	Dikwa (yellow card) 57' (goal) 87'; Nodarse (yellow card) 57'; Kwizera (yellow card) 89'	Report	Riley (yellow card) 22'; Hackshaw 33' (red card) 72'; Diaz (yellow card) 90+6'	Stadium: Beirne Stadium; Referee: Brandon Stevis

August 24 25	Oakland Roots SC	1–1	Memphis 901 FC	Hayward, California
	Nije (yellow card) 20' (goal) 61'; Diaz (yellow card) 43'; Chéry (yellow card) 45+1'; Margvelashvili (yellow card) 51'; Rodriguez (yellow card) 90+3'; Riley (yellow card) 90+5'	Report	Turci (yellow card) 8'; Armenakas 32'; Meza (yellow card) 62'; Cissoko (yellow card) 65'; Deric (yellow card) 90+1'	Stadium: Pioneer Stadium; Attendance: 3,041; Referee: Lorenzo Hernandez

August 31 26	Oakland Roots SC	1–0	New Mexico United	Hayward, California
3:00 PM	Gomez (yellow card) 51'; Rodriguez (yellow card) 57'; Hackshaw (yellow card) 63'; Reid (yellow card) 73'; Dwyer 76'	Report	Reyes (yellow card) 3'; Flanagan (yellow card) 44'; Quill (yellow card) 45'; Gloster (yellow card) 56'; Swartz (yellow card) 86'	Stadium: Pioneer Stadium; Attendance: 3,431; Referee: 3,431

September 7 27	North Carolina FC	5–0	Oakland Roots SC	Cary, North Carolina
	da Costa 6'; Mentzingen 8'; Craig 32' (yellow card) 88'; Conway 44'; Washington (yellow card) 54'; Martin (yellow card) 59'; Armstrong 63'	Report		Stadium: WakeMed Soccer Park; Attendance: 1,946; Referee: Elvis Osmanovic

September 14 28	Oakland Roots SC	0–1	San Antonio FC	Hayward, California
7:00 PM	Riley (yellow card) 45+2' (yellow-red card) 45+5'; Logue (yellow card) 48'; Njie (yellow card) 62'; Reid (yellow card) 79'; Baca (yellow card) 89'	Report	Solignac 4' (yellow card) 44'; Haakenson (yellow card) 45+5'; Sánchez (yellow card) 59'; Agudelo (yellow card) 63'; Grey (yellow card) 65'	Stadium: Pioneer Stadium; Attendance: 3,841; Referee: Ricardo Montero

September 21 29	Hartford Athletic	2–0	Oakland Roots SC	Hartford, Connecticut
4:00 PM	Hairston 20'; Scarlett (red card) 51'; Edwards 77'	Report	Donasiyano (yellow card) 11'; Margvelashvili (yellow card) 40'; Sinisterra (yellow card) 46'	Stadium: Trinity Health Stadium; Attendance: 5,500; Referee: Alyssa Nichols

September 29 30	Oakland Roots SC	0–1	FC Tulsa	Hayward, California
3:00 PM	Dwyer (yellow card) 74'; Margvelashvili (yellow card) 75'	Report	Bibout 7' (yellow card) 45+3'; Pacheco (yellow card) 76'; Damm (yellow card) 78'; Souahy (yellow card) 87'	Stadium: Pioneer Stadium; Attendance: 4,190; Referee: Thomas Snyder

October 5 31	Memphis 901 FC	1–1	Oakland Roots SC	Memphis, Tennessee
	Lapa 4'; Hyndman (yellow card) 42'; Quezada (yellow card) 63'; Turci (yellow card) 67'	Report	Baca (yellow card) 32'; Riley 36'; Njie (yellow card) 45+4'; Dwyer (yellow card) 90+5'	Stadium: AutoZone Park; Attendance: 3,195; Referee: Joshua Encarnación

October 12 32	Oakland Roots SC	0–1	Phoenix Rising FC	Hayward, California
7:00 PM				Stadium: Pioneer Stadium; Attendance: 5,252

October 19 33	Las Vegas Lights FC	2-3	Oakland Roots SC	Las Vegas, Nevada
7:30 PM	Hackshaw 12' (o.g.); Noël 90+4'	Report	Rodriguez 3', 72'; Njie (yellow card) 36'; Diaz (yellow card) 89'; Donasiyano (yellow card) 90+3'	Stadium: Cashman Field; Attendance: 2,878; Referee: Brandon Stevis

October 26 34	Oakland Roots SC	0–5	Birmingham Legion FC	Hayward, California
7:00 PM		Report		Stadium: Pioneer Stadium; Attendance: 4,995

==== USL Cup playoffs ====
November 2, 2024 West	Colorado Springs Switchbacks	2–0	Oakland Roots SC	Colorado Springs, Colorado
6:00 PM MDT	Henriquez 41'; Magee (yellow card) 49'; Damus 56' (pen.); Hanya (yellow card) 70'; Huerman (yellow card) 79'; Rocha (yellow card) 80'	Report	Margvelashvili (yellow card) 55'; Riley (yellow card) 64'; Diaz (yellow card) 90+5'; Njie (yellow card) 90+6'	Stadium: Weidner Field; Attendance: 7,463; Referee: Abdou Ndiaye

=== U.S. Open Cup ===
As a member of the USL Championship, the Oakland Roots entered the U.S. Open Cup in the third round at home against amateur soccer club El Farolito SC. After winning in added extra time 2–1, the Roots eventually lost to first tier Major League Soccer club San Jose Earthquakes in the Round of 32.

April 16 Third Round	Oakland Roots SC (USLC) (California)	2–1 (a.e.t.)	(California) El Farolito SC (NPSL)	Hayward, California
7:30 PM	Diaz 45+1' (yellow card) 56'; Rasmussen (yellow card) 90+1'; Reid (yellow card) 95' (yellow-red card) 106'; Elmasnaouy 98'	Report	Benson 12'; Kreye (yellow card) 33' (yellow-red card) 51'; Yabur (yellow card) 56'; Sidibe (yellow card) 90+5'; Buitrago (yellow card) 102'; Martinez (yellow card) 102'; Higuera (yellow card) 116'	Stadium: Pioneer Stadium; Attendance: 1,500; Referee: Robert Vincze

May 7 Round of 32	San Jose Earthquakes (California) (MLS)	1–0	(California) Oakland Roots SC (USLC)	San Jose, California
7:00 PM	Bouda (yellow card) 51' (goal) 76'; Judd (yellow card) 84'	Report	Rasmussen (yellow card) 19'; Hackshaw (yellow card) 24'; Rodriguez (red card) 82'	Stadium: PayPal Park; Attendance: 5,000; Referee: Jeffrey Greeson
