= 2025 Oakland Roots SC season =

Oakland Roots SC
2025 season
- Chairman: Steven Aldrich
- Head coach: Gavin Glinton (Until June 2); Benny Feilhaber (From June 3)
- Stadium: Oakland Coliseum
- USLC: Western Conference: 10th Overall: 21st
- USL Championship Playoffs: DNQ
- U.S. Open Cup: Third round
- USL Cup: Group stage
Home colors	Away colors

The 2025 Oakland Roots SC season was the club's seventh season of existence and fifth in the USL Championship.

The Roots, after spending their first seasons playing at various college campuses, moved into the Oakland Coliseum during the offseason. This followed the move of the Athletics to Sacramento's Sutter Health Park in preparation of a move to Las Vegas.

== Squad Information ==
=== Roster ===
As of June 1, 2025

Note: Flags indicate national team as defined under FIFA eligibility rules; some limited exceptions apply. Players may hold more than one non-FIFA nationality.

No.	Pos.	Nation	Player
1	GK	USA	Kendall McIntosh
3	DF	USA	Julian Bravo
4	DF	GEO	Gagi Margvelashvili
5	DF	USA	Camden Riley
6	MF	USA	Daniel Gomez
7	FW	USA	Wolfgang Prentice
9	FW	LBR	Peter Wilson
10	MF	AUS	Panos Armenakas
11	MF	COL	José Luis Sinisterra
12	MF	USA	Tyler Gibson
15	DF	TRI	Neveal Hackshaw
18	MF	UGA	Bobosi Byaruhanga
22	FW	USA	EJ Johnson
25	DF	MEX	Jürgen Damm
26	DF	SOM	Abdi Mohamed

No.	Pos.	Nation	Player
30	DF	CAN	Morey Doner
33	DF	USA	Kai Greene
35	GK	SUI	Raphael Spiegel
39	MF	USA	Javier Bedolla-Vera
45	MF	USA	Ali Elmasnaouy
47	FW	USA	Julio Martinez
48	FW	USA	Luis Saldaña
49	DF	USA	Tomás Caminos
50	DF	FRA	Thomas Camier
52	FW	USA	Juan Sanchez
57	GK	USA	Alejandro Caracheo
60	GK	USA	Timothy Syrel
77	MF	ENG	Faysal Bettache
88	DF	USA	Ilya Alekseev
99	FW	MEX	Danny Trejo

1. USL Academy Contract

== Competitions ==
=== USL Championship ===
Pos	Team	Pld	W	L	T	GF	GA	GD	Pts	Qualification
8	Colorado Springs Switchbacks FC	30	10	13	7	35	47	−12	37	Playoffs
9	Lexington SC	30	9	12	9	31	42	−11	36	
10	Oakland Roots SC	30	8	14	8	42	52	−10	32	
11	Monterey Bay FC	30	7	15	8	27	45	−18	29	
12	Las Vegas Lights FC	30	6	15	9	23	50	−27	27	

Source: USL Championship Standings
Rules for classification: 1) head-to-head points; 2) head-to-head goal differential; 3) points-per-game within conference; 4) total wins; 5) total goal differential; 6) total goals scored; 7) points earned against top four Conference finishers; 8) disciplinary points; 9) coin toss or drawing of lots

==== Match results ====
On December 19, 2024, the USL Championship released the regular season schedule for all 24 teams.

All times are in Pacific Standard Time.

===== March =====
March 8 1	Orange County SC	4–2	Oakland Roots SC	Irvine, California
7:00 PM	Doghman 28'; Zubak 47'; Benalcazar 52'; Scott 90'+1'	Report	Gibson (yellow card) 3'; Johnson (yellow card) 59'; Gomez (yellow card) 62'; Prentice 71'; Njie 90'+4'	Stadium: Championship Soccer Stadium; Attendance: 5,000; Referee: Ekaterina Koroleva

March 15 2	Monterey Bay FC	3-2	Oakland Roots SC	Seaside, California
7:00 PM	Malango, 56'; Gindiri, 65' (Pen); Søjberg, 69'; Garcia (red card) 84'	Report	Riley, 44'; Sinisterra, 71'	Stadium: Cardinale Stadium; Attendance: 5,160

March 22 3	Oakland Roots SC	1-2	San Antonio FC	Oakland, California
7:00 PM	Rasmussen, 7'	Report	Greive, 5'; Haakenson, 69'	Stadium: Oakland Coliseum; Attendance: 26,575; Referee: Jeremy Scheer

March 29 4	Oakland Roots SC	0-0	Las Vegas Lights FC	Oakland, California
7:00 PM		Report		Stadium: Oakland Coliseum; Attendance: 7,077; Referee: Elvis Osmanovic

===== April =====
April 5 5	Oakland Roots SC	0-3	Rhode Island FC	Oakland, California
1:00 PM				Stadium: Oakland Coliseum

April 12 6	FC Tulsa	1-2	Oakland Roots SC	Tulsa, Oklahoma
5:00 PM				Stadium: ONEOK Field

April 19 7	Oakland Roots SC	2-0	Orange County SC	Oakland, California
1:00 PM				Stadium: Oakland Coliseum

===== May =====
May 4 8	Oakland Roots SC	0-1	Sacramento Republic FC	Oakland, California
4:00 PM		Report		Stadium: Oakland Coliseum
Note: Originally set for May 3, but changed to May 4 to accommodate broadcasting on CBS.

May 10 9	San Antonio FC	1-2	Oakland Roots SC	San Antonio, Texas
5:30 PM	J. Hernandez 12' (yellow card) 14'; Crognale (yellow card) 21'; Taintor (yellow card) 30' (red card) 89'	Report	Alekseev (yellow card) 8'; Sinisterra 25'; Wilson 84'; McIntosh (yellow card) 90+5'	Stadium: Toyota Field; Attendance: 6,507; Referee: Nabil Bensalah

May 16 10	North Carolina FC	4–2	Oakland Roots SC	Cary, North Carolina
4:00 PM	Servania 33'; Martin (yellow card) 38'; Maldonado 45+2'; Washington (yellow card) 53'; Perez 74'; Anderson 90+9'	Report	Hackshaw (yellow card) 28'; Damm 63' (yellow card) 83'; Wilson 81'	Stadium: WakeMed Soccer Park; Attendance: 2,736; Referee: Gerald Flores

May 24 11	Oakland Roots SC	0–3	New Mexico United	Oakland, California
7:00 PM	Hackshaw (yellow card) 41'; Byaruhanga (yellow card) 77'	Report	Gloster 3'; Bailey 6' (yellow card) 68'; Zelalem (yellow card) 15'; Ryden (yellow card) 72'; Talen Maples (yellow card) 84'; Akale 89'	Stadium: Oakland Coliseum; Attendance: 8,757; Referee: Trevor Wiseman

===== June =====
June 7 12	Oakland Roots SC	0–0	El Paso Locomotive FC	Oakland, California
7:00 PM		Report		Stadium: Oakland Coliseum; Attendance: 7,586; Referee: Ramy Touchan

June 14 14	Colorado Springs Switchbacks FC	1–0	Oakland Roots SC	Colorado Springs, Colorado
	Micaletto 39'	Report		Stadium: Weidner Field; Attendance: 7,800; Referee: John Matto

June 21 15	Birmingham Legion FC	0–1	Oakland Roots SC	Birmingham, Alabama
		Report	Greene 55' (pen.)	Stadium: Protective Stadium; Attendance: 4,725; Referee: Joshua Encarnación

===== July =====
July 5 15	Oakland Roots SC	2–0	Detroit City FC	Oakland, California
7:00 PM	Armenakas 55'; Polisi 85' (o.g.)	Report		Stadium: Oakland Coliseum; Attendance: 5,191; Referee: Greg Dopka

July 12 16	Oakland Roots SC	1–2	Phoenix Rising FC	Oakland, California
7:00 PM	Doner 27'	Report	Sacko 60'; Dennis 69'; Avayevu (yellow card) 33' (yellow-red card) 90'+1'	Stadium: Oakland Coliseum; Attendance: 6,125; Referee: Joseph Dickerson

July 19 17	Loudoun United FC	0–2	Oakland Roots SC	Leesburg, Virginia
4:00 PM		Report	Hackshaw 22'; Wilson 27'	Stadium: Segra Field; Attendance: 2,069; Referee: Gerald Flores

===== August =====
August 9 18	Oakland Roots SC	1–2	Colorado Springs Switchbacks FC	Oakland, California
7:00 PM	Wilson 59'	Report	Fjellberg 43'; Huerman 49'	Stadium: Oakland Coliseum; Attendance: 5,063; Referee: Matthew Thompson

August 16 19	Sacramento Republic FC	3–3	Oakland Roots SC	Sacramento, California
8:00 PM	López 17'; Parano 33'; Cicerone 54'	Report	Gomez 10'; Wilson 45'; Damm 87'	Stadium: Heart Health Park; Attendance: 11,569; Referee: Matthew Corrigan

August 23 20	Lexington SC	2–1	Oakland Roots SC	Lexington, Kentucky
4:00 PM	Burke 82'; Hafferty 90'+2'	Report	Wilson 6'	Stadium: Lexington SC Stadium; Attendance: 4,508; Referee: Joshua Encarnación

August 30 21	Oakland Roots SC	1–0	Monterey Bay FC	Oakland, California
7:00 PM	Doner 32'	Report		Stadium: Oakland Coliseum; Attendance: 9,871; Referee: Thomas Snyder

===== September =====
September 6 22	Oakland Roots SC	0–2	Pittsburgh Riverhounds FC	Oakland, California
7:00 PM		Report	Williams 4', 45' (pen.)	Stadium: Oakland Coliseum; Attendance: 5,232; Referee: Elijio Arreguin

September 13 23	Charleston Battery	3–3	Oakland Roots SC	Mount Pleasant, South Carolina
4:30 PM	Jennings 26'; Myers 46'; Rubin 74'	Report	Johnson 45'+6' (pen.); Wilson 52', 55'	Stadium: Patriots Point Soccer Complex; Attendance: 4,030; Referee: Mark Verso

September 20 24	Oakland Roots SC	1–1	FC Tulsa	Oakland, California
7:00 PM	Calheira 51'	Report	Wilson 23'	Stadium: Oakland Coliseum; Attendance: 4,938; Referee: Elton García

September 27 25	Phoenix Rising FC	3–3	Oakland Roots SC	Phoenix, Arizona
7:00 PM	Dennis 45', 86'; Flores (yellow card) 89' (yellow-red card) 90'+4'; Cabral 90'+7' (pen.)	Report	Trejo 1'; Wilson 9', 22'; Margvelashvili (red card) 90'+4'	Stadium: Phoenix Rising Soccer Stadium; Attendance: 4,999; Referee: Elvis Osmanovic

===== October =====
October 1 26	El Paso Locomotive FC	3–1	Oakland Roots SC	El Paso, Texas
11:00 AM	Moreno 1', 72'; Calvillo 5'	Report	Wilson 90'+2'	Stadium: Southwest University Park; Attendance: 4,049; Referee: Amin Hadzic

October 4 27	Oakland Roots SC	1–3	Hartford Athletic	Oakland, California
7:00 PM	Wilson 31'	Report	Belluz 56'; Edwards 64'; Makangila 90'+5'	Stadium: Oakland Coliseum; Attendance: 5,716; Referee: Alex Billeter

October 11 28	Las Vegas Lights FC	2–2	Oakland Roots SC	Las Vegas, Nevada
7:30 PM	Rodriguez 31'; Stojanovic 87'	Report	Wilson 29'; Trejo 56'	Stadium: Cashman Field; Attendance: 4,570; Referee: Joe Surgan

October 18 29	New Mexico United	3–3	Oakland Roots SC	Albuquerque, New Mexico
6:00 PM	Akale 13'; Hackshaw 19' (o.g.); Maples 28' (pen.)	Report	Wilson 16' (pen.), 41' (pen.); Margvelashvili 82'	Stadium: Isotopes Park; Attendance: 8,756; Referee: John Griggs

October 25 30	Oakland Roots SC	3–0	Lexington SC	Oakland, California
7:00 PM	Wilson 19'; Prentice 82'; Bettache 89'	Report		Stadium: Oakland Coliseum; Attendance: 12,079; Referee: Greg Dopka

=== USL Cup ===
The Roots participated in the second edition of the USL Cup, the first edition to feature teams from both the USL Championship and League One.

==== Group stage standings ====
Pos	Lg	Team	Pld	W	PKW	PKL	L	GF	GA	GD	Pts
3	USLC	Monterey Bay FC	4	2	0	0	2	6	6	0	6
4	USLC	Orange County SC	4	2	0	0	2	5	6	−1	6
5	USL1	AV Alta FC	4	1	1	0	2	5	6	−1	5
6	USLC	Oakland Roots SC	4	1	0	1	2	5	6	−1	4
7	USL1	Spokane Velocity FC	4	1	0	0	3	2	5	−3	3

Updated to match(es) played on July 26, 2025. Source: USL

April 27, 2025	Spokane Velocity FC	2–1	Oakland Roots SC	Spokane, Washington
7:00 PM PDT	L. Gil 25'; Peláez 43'	Report	Margvelashvili 52'	Stadium: One Spokane Stadium; Attendance: 2,205; Referee: Brad Jensen

May 31, 2025	AV Alta FC	2–2 (4–2 p)	Oakland Roots SC	Lancaster, California
7:30 PM PDT	Cruz 57'; Alassane 90+5'	Report	Doner 62'; Wilson 63'	Stadium: Lancaster Municipal Stadium; Attendance: 3,951; Referee: Mark Verso
	Penalties
	Blancas (penalty scored); Cerritos (penalty scored); Cruz (penalty scored); Pehlivanov (penalty scored)		(penalty missed) Njie; (penalty scored) Greene; (penalty scored) Hackshaw; (penalty missed) Wilson

June 28, 2025	Oakland Roots SC	2–1	Monterey Bay FC	Oakland, California
7:00 PM PDT	Muir 17' (o.g.); Doner 58'	Report	Ivanovic 86'	Stadium: Oakland Coliseum; Attendance: 4,957; Referee: Matthew Corrigan

July 26, 2025	Oakland Roots SC	0–1	Orange County SC	Oakland, California
1:00 PM PDT		Report	Jamison 30'	Stadium: Oakland Coliseum; Attendance: 5,418; Referee: Cristian Campo

=== U.S. Open Cup ===
The Oakland Roots, as a member of the second division USL Championship, entered the U.S. Open Cup in the Third Round based on its performance in the 2024 USL Championship season.

April 15 Third Round	(Washington (state)) Tacoma Defiance	2–1 (a.e.t.)	(California) Oakland Roots SC	Tukwila, Washington
7:30 pm PDT	Kingston 28'; De Rosario 108'	Report	Hackshaw 75' (pen.)	Stadium: Starfire Sports Stadium; Attendance: 281; Referee: Dion Cox
