= 2026 Oakland Roots SC season =

Oakland Roots SC
2026 season
- Chairman: Steven Aldrich
- Head coach: Ryan Martin
- Stadium: Oakland Coliseum
- USLC: Western Conference: 10th
- USLC Playoffs: DNQ
- U.S. Open Cup: DNQ
- USL Cup: Group stage
Home colors	Away colors

The 2026 Oakland Roots SC season was the club's eighth season of existence and sixth in the USL Championship.

== Squad Information ==
=== Roster ===
As of August 5, 2026

Note: Flags indicate national team as defined under FIFA eligibility rules; some limited exceptions apply. Players may hold more than one non-FIFA nationality.

No.	Pos.	Nation	Player
1	GK	USA	Kendall McIntosh
2	MF	BRA	Bruno Lapa
4	MF	USA	Tommy McCabe
5	DF	ESP	David Garcia
6	MF	UGA	Bobosi Byaruhanga
7	FW	USA	Wolfgang Prentice
9	FW	LBR	Peter Wilson
10	MF	FRA	Florian Valot
11	DF	ESP	Jesus De Vincente
12	MF	USA	Tyler Gibson
15	DF	TTO	Neveal Hackshaw
17	DF	USA	Keegan Tingey
19	FW	USA	Jackson Kiil

No.	Pos.	Nation	Player
20	MF	CAN	Mark Fisher
23	DF	USA	Julian Bravo
27	FW	FRA	Bertin Jacquesson
33	GK	SUI	Raphael Spiegel
34	DF	USA	Michael Edwards
42	MF	USA	Emilio Martinez
44	FW	USA	Bradley Roberson
55	DF	ESA	Jonathan Polio
57	GK	USA	Alejandro Caracheo Luna
59	MF	SRB	Luka Rosić
77	MF	ENG	Faysal Bettache
99	FW	MEX	Danny Trejo

1. USL Academy Contract

Note: Flags indicate national team as defined under FIFA eligibility rules; some limited exceptions apply. Players may hold more than one non-FIFA nationality.

No.	Pos.	Nation	Player
8	MF	USA	Ali Elmasnaouy (on loan to Spokane Velocity)

== Competitions ==
=== Preseason ===
In preparation for the 2026 season, the Oakland Roots competed in five preseason matches, mainly against fellow USL clubs.

=== USL Championship ===
Pos	Team	Pld	W	L	T	GF	GA	GD	Pts	Qualification
8	Phoenix Rising FC	30	11	10	9	45	46	−1	42	Playoffs
9	Orange County SC	30	10	11	9	39	49	−10	39	
10	Oakland Roots SC	30	9	10	11	39	40	−1	38	
11	Las Vegas Lights FC	30	10	14	6	41	48	−7	36	
12	Monterey Bay FC	30	6	18	6	32	52	−20	24	

Updated to match(es) played on October 24, 2026. Source: USL Championship Standings
Rules for classification: 1) total wins against conference opponents; 2) goal differential against conference opponents; 3) goals scored against conference opponents; 4) head-to-head points against conference opponents; 5) points per game against conference opponents; 6) points per game against non-conference opponents; 7) fewest disciplinary points; 8) coin toss or drawing of lots

==== Match results ====
On December 16, 2025, the USL Championship released the schedule for all 25 teams for both the regular season and the USL Cup.

All times are in Pacific Standard Time.

===== March =====
March 7 1	Monterey Bay FC	0–1	Oakland Roots SC	Seaside, California
7:00 PM		Report	Fisher 85'	Stadium: Cardinale Stadium; Attendance: 4,240; Referee: Nabil Bensalah

March 14 2	Oakland Roots SC	2–1	New Mexico United	Oakland, California
7:00 PM	Prentice 6'; Astorga 80' (o.g.)	Report	Rennicks 82'	Stadium: Oakland Coliseum; Attendance: 14,419; Referee: Gerald Flores

March 21 3	Phoenix Rising FC	2–2	Oakland Roots SC	Phoenix, Arizona
3:00 PM	Gómez 85'; Studenthofft 90+6'	Report	Prentice 42'; Bravo 45+2'	Stadium: Phoenix Rising Soccer Stadium; Attendance: 4,310; Referee: Matthew Thompson

March 28 4	Oakland Roots SC	0–1	Orange County SC	Oakland, California
7:00 PM	Spiegel (red card) 90+4'	Report	Bunbury 47'	Stadium: Oakland Coliseum; Attendance: 6,724; Referee: Corbyn May

===== April =====
April 11 5	Tampa Bay Rowdies	2–2	Oakland Roots SC	St. Petersburg, Florida
4:30 PM	Micaletto 3'; Cicerone 45+2'	Report	Ostrem 12' (o.g.); Prentice 49'	Stadium: Al Lang Stadium; Attendance: 4,038; Referee: Abdou Ndiaye

April 18 6	Oakland Roots SC	1–1	FC Tulsa	Oakland, California
7:00 PM	Prentice 4'; Hackshaw (red card)	Report		Stadium: Oakland Coliseum; Attendance: 3,726; Referee: Ramy Touchan

April 22 7	Oakland Roots SC	4–2	Las Vegas Lights FC	Oakland, California
7:00 PM	Wilson 18', 58', 87' (pen.); Bettache 22'	Report	Anderson 69'; Rodriguez 78'	Stadium: Oakland Coliseum; Attendance: 2,496; Referee: Muhammad Hassan

===== May =====
May 2 8	Loudoun United FC	2–2	Oakland Roots SC	Leesburg, Virginia
2:00 PM	Aman 9'; Santos 66' (pen.)	Report	Jacquesson 18'; Wilson 90+2'	Stadium: Segra Field; Attendance: 1,912; Referee: Mark Verso

May 9 9	Oakland Roots SC	2–1	El Paso Locomotive FC	Oakland, California
7:00 PM	Wilson] 45+5'; Lepley 83'	Report	Rubin 3'; Ortiz (red card) 18'	Stadium: Oakland Coliseum; Attendance: 4,076; Referee: Thomas Snyder

May 23 10	Orange County SC	3–2	Oakland Roots SC	Santa Ana, CA
7:00 PM	Benalcazar 8'; Kelly 50'; Sylla 87'	Report	Prentice 40'; Wilson 56'	Stadium: Santa Ana Stadium; Attendance: 7,651; Referee: Igor Bych
Note: Match moved from Irvine to Santa Ana to accommodate the USMNT using Championship Soccer Stadium & Great Park as their World Cup base camp.

May 30 11	Oakland Roots SC	0–1	Colorado Springs Switchbacks FC	Oakland, California
7:00 PM		Report	Edwards 5' (o.g.)	Stadium: Oakland Coliseum; Attendance: 4,247; Referee: Elton García

===== June =====
June 13 12	Oakland Roots SC	0–0	Miami FC	Oakland, California
7:00 PM		Report		Stadium: Oakland Coliseum; Attendance: 3,780; Referee: Robert Vincze

June 17 13	Oakland Roots SC	1–1	Birmingham Legion FC	Oakland, California
12:00 PM	Wilson 90+3'	Report	Vassell 45+2'	Stadium: Oakland Coliseum; Attendance: 4,601; Referee: Trevor Wiseman

June 20 14	Phoenix Rising FC	3–4	Oakland Roots SC	Phoenix, Arizona
7:30 PM	Sacko 62' (pen.); Gómez 72'; Arase 90'; Biasi (red card) 90+10'	Report	Wilson 49' (pen.), 78'; Trejo 56', (red card) 90+10'; Valot 74'	Stadium: Phoenix Rising Soccer Stadium; Attendance: 3,740; Referee: Ricardo Fierro

===== July =====
July 4 15	New Mexico United	2–1	Oakland Roots SC	Albuquerque, New Mexico
6:30 PM	Nava 6'; Bailey 41'	Report	Wilson 67' (pen.)	Stadium: Isotopes Park; Attendance: 14,847; Referee: Brandon Stevis

July 22 16	Lexington SC	2–0	Oakland Roots SC	Lexington, Kentucky
4:00 PM	Goodrum 50'; Ferri 63'	Report		Stadium: Lexington SC Stadium; Attendance: 4,309; Referee: Alyssa Pennington

July 25 17	Oakland Roots SC	1–3	Sacramento Republic FC	Oakland, California
7:00 PM	Valot 21'	Report	Rodríguez 19'; Edwards 75', 90+1'	Stadium: Oakland Coliseum; Attendance: 6,986; Referee: Joshua Encarnación

===== August =====
August 1 18	Oakland Roots SC	0–1	Pittsburgh Riverhounds SC	Oakland, California
7:00 PM		Report	Goldthorp 20'	Stadium: Oakland Coliseum; Attendance: 5,349; Referee: Muhammad Hassan

August 5 19	Las Vegas Lights FC	0–0	Oakland Roots SC	Las Vegas, Nevada
7:00 PM		Report		Stadium: Cashman Field; Attendance: 2,230; Referee: Drew Klemp

August 8 20	El Paso Locomotive FC	1–0	Oakland Roots SC	El Paso, Texas
6:00 PM	Rubin 9'	Report		Stadium: Southwest University Park; Attendance: 4,723; Referee: John Griggs

August 15 21	Oakland Roots SC	1–1	Monterey Bay FC	Oakland, California
7:00 PM	Jacquesson 45'	Report	Gindiri 77'	Stadium: Oakland Coliseum; Attendance: 4,225; Referee: Abdou Ndiaye

August 22 22	San Antonio FC	0–1	Oakland Roots SC	San Antonio, Texas
6:00 PM	Berrón (yellow card) 51' (yellow-red card) 86'	Report	Wilson 90+3'	Stadium: Toyota Field; Attendance: 6,101

August 29 23	Oakland Roots SC	1–1	Orange County SC	Oakland, California
5:00 PM	Valot 20'	Report	Bazini 60'	Stadium: Oakland Coliseum; Attendance: 7,063; Referee: Nabil Bensalah

===== September =====
September 12 24	Oakland Roots SC	1–4	Lexington SC	Oakland, California
7:00 PM	Wilson 52'	Report	Goodrum 22', 78', 87'; Epps 83'	Stadium: Oakland Coliseum; Referee: Benjamin Meyer

September 20 25	Indy Eleven	0–1	Oakland Roots SC	Indianapolis, Indiana
2:00 PM		Report	Wilson 59'	Stadium: Carroll Stadium; Attendance: 7,331; Referee: Rodrigo Albuquerque

September 26 26	Oakland Roots SC	3–0	Phoenix Rising FC	Oakland, California
7:00 PM	Lapa 7'; Trejo 22'; Jacquesson 71'	Report		Stadium: Oakland Coliseum; Attendance: 5,240; Referee: Edson Carvajal

===== October =====
October 3 27	Colorado Springs Switchbacks FC	0–0	Oakland Roots SC	Colorado Springs, Colorado
6:00 PM		Report		Stadium: Weidner Field; Attendance: 6,797

October 10 28	Oakland Roots SC	0–0	San Antonio FC	Oakland, California
7:00 PM		Report		Stadium: Oakland Coliseum; Attendance: 9,718; Referee: Corbyn May

October 17 29	FC Tulsa	2–4	Oakland Roots SC	Tulsa, Oklahoma
5:00 PM	Dorsey 3', 49'	Report	Prentice 21', 60'; Wilson 83'; Jacquesson 87'	Stadium: ONEOK Field; Attendance: 5,012; Referee: Calin Radosav

October 24 30	Sacramento Republic FC	3–2	Oakland Roots SC	Sacramento, California
7:00 PM	Midence 2'; Desmond 81'; Edwards 90'	Report	Trejo 45'; Wilson 45+5'	Stadium: Heart Health Park; Attendance: 11,569; Referee: John Griggs

=== USL Cup ===
The Roots participated in the third edition of the USL Cup, the second edition to feature teams from both the USL Championship and League One.

==== Group Standings ====
Pos	Lg	Team	Pld	W	PKW	PKL	L	GF	GA	GD	Pts
2	USL1	AC Boise	4	2	1	0	1	8	6	+2	8
3	USLC	Sacramento Republic FC	4	2	1	0	1	6	3	+3	8
4	USLC	Oakland Roots SC	4	1	0	1	2	4	5	−1	4
5	USLC	Las Vegas Lights FC	4	1	0	1	2	4	6	−2	4
6	USLC	Monterey Bay FC	4	0	1	1	2	7	9	−2	3

==== Group Stage ====
April 25	Monterey Bay FC	1–1 (4–3 p)	Oakland Roots SC	Seaside, California
7:00 PM	Paul 63'	Report	Kill 15'	Stadium: Cardinale Stadium; Attendance: 3,605; Referee: Kalilou Jarju
	Penalties
	Paul (penalty missed); Leggett (penalty scored); Glasgow (penalty scored); Joseph (penalty scored); Blancas (penalty missed); Gordon (penalty scored)		(penalty scored) de Vicente; (penalty missed) Wilson; (penalty missed) Prentice; (penalty scored) Tingey; (penalty scored) McCabe; (penalty missed) Elmasnaouy

May 16	Oakland Roots SC	0–1	Sacramento Republic FC	Oakland, California
5:00 PM		Report	Malango 56'	Stadium: Oakland-Alameda County Coliseum; Attendance: 5,669; Referee: Matthew Corrigan

June 6	Las Vegas Lights FC	0–2	Oakland Roots SC	Las Vegas, Nevada
7:30 PM		Report	de Vicente 41'; Lepley 59'	Stadium: Cashman Field; Attendance: 2,774; Referee: Jaclyn Metz

July 11	Oakland Roots SC	1–2	Spokane Velocity FC	Oakland, California
12:00 PM	Hackshaw 2'	Report	Brett 34', 55'; Peláez 90+5'	Stadium: Oakland Coliseum; Attendance: 1,474; Referee: Brad Jensen
