= Trayvone Reid =

Jamaican footballer (born 2000)

Personal information
- Full name: Trayvone Reid
- Date of birth: 25 February 2000 (age 26)
- Place of birth: Jamaica
- Position: Midfielder

Team information
- Current team: Harbour View

Senior career*
Years	Team	Apps	(Gls)
2018–2022	Tivoli Gardens	50	(7)
2022	→ Harbour View (loan)	25	(9)
2022–2023	Harbour View	5	(0)
2023–2024	Oakland Roots	59	(4)
2024–2026	Harbour View	88	(32)
2026-	Mount Pleasant	12	(3)

International career^{‡}
2016	Jamaica U17	2	(0)
2023	Jamaica	1	(0)
- * Club domestic league appearances and goals as of 01:01, 4 August 2026 (UTC) ‡ National team caps and goals as of 21:07, 15 March 2023 (UTC)

Trayvone Reid (born 25 February 2000) is a Jamaican footballer who plays for Jamaica Premier League club Mount Pleasant.

== Career ==
Reid began his career with Tivoli Gardens, before securing a loan move to Jamaica Premier League rivals Harbour View in 2022. Following a successful loan spell where he helped the team to win the league title, Harbour View made the deal permanent in September 2022. However, shortly after on 12 December 2022, Reid signed with USL Championship side Oakland Roots.

== International career ==
In August 2022, Reid was called up to the Jamaica national team for a mini-tournament in Austria. However, he didn't make an appearance.

== Honors ==
=== Club ===
Harbour View

- Jamaica Premier League: 2022
