= Jeciel Cedeno =

Ecuadorian footballer (born 2000)

Jeciel Cedeño
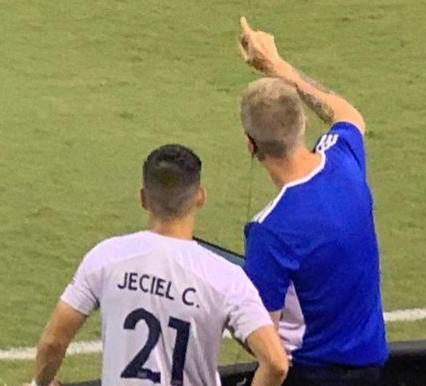
- Jeciel Cedeño (left) being substituted into a 2021 Hartford Athletic game.

Personal information
- Full name: Jeciel Jair Cedeño Benavides
- Date of birth: 4 March 2000 (age 26)
- Place of birth: Ecuador
- Height: 1.70 m (5 ft 7 in)
- Positions: Forward; midfielder

Team information
- Current team: Detroit City
- Number: 10

Youth career
- Alfaro Moreno Academy
- Union City SC
- Fairview FC
- 2016–2018: Barcelona S.C.
- 2018–2019: New York Red Bulls

Senior career*
Years	Team	Apps	(Gls)
2019	New York Red Bulls II	2	(0)
2021–2023	Hartford Athletic	36	(2)
2023–2024	Oakland Roots	42	(4)
2024–	Detroit City	57	(4)
- * Club domestic league appearances and goals as of November 4, 2026

Jeciel Jair Cedeño Benavides (born 3 April 2000) is an Ecuadorian footballer who plays for Detroit City FC in the USL Championship.

== Career ==
Cedeño is a member of the New York Red Bulls Academy. During the 2019 USL Championship season he appeared for New York Red Bulls II.

On 27 May 2021, Cedeño signed with USL Championship side Hartford Athletic. He was traded to fellow USL Championship side Oakland Roots on 8 June 2023 in exchange for Edgardo Rito. On 29 July 2024, Cedeno was traded to Detroit City FC.
