= Gagi Margvelashvili =

Georgian footballer (born 1996)

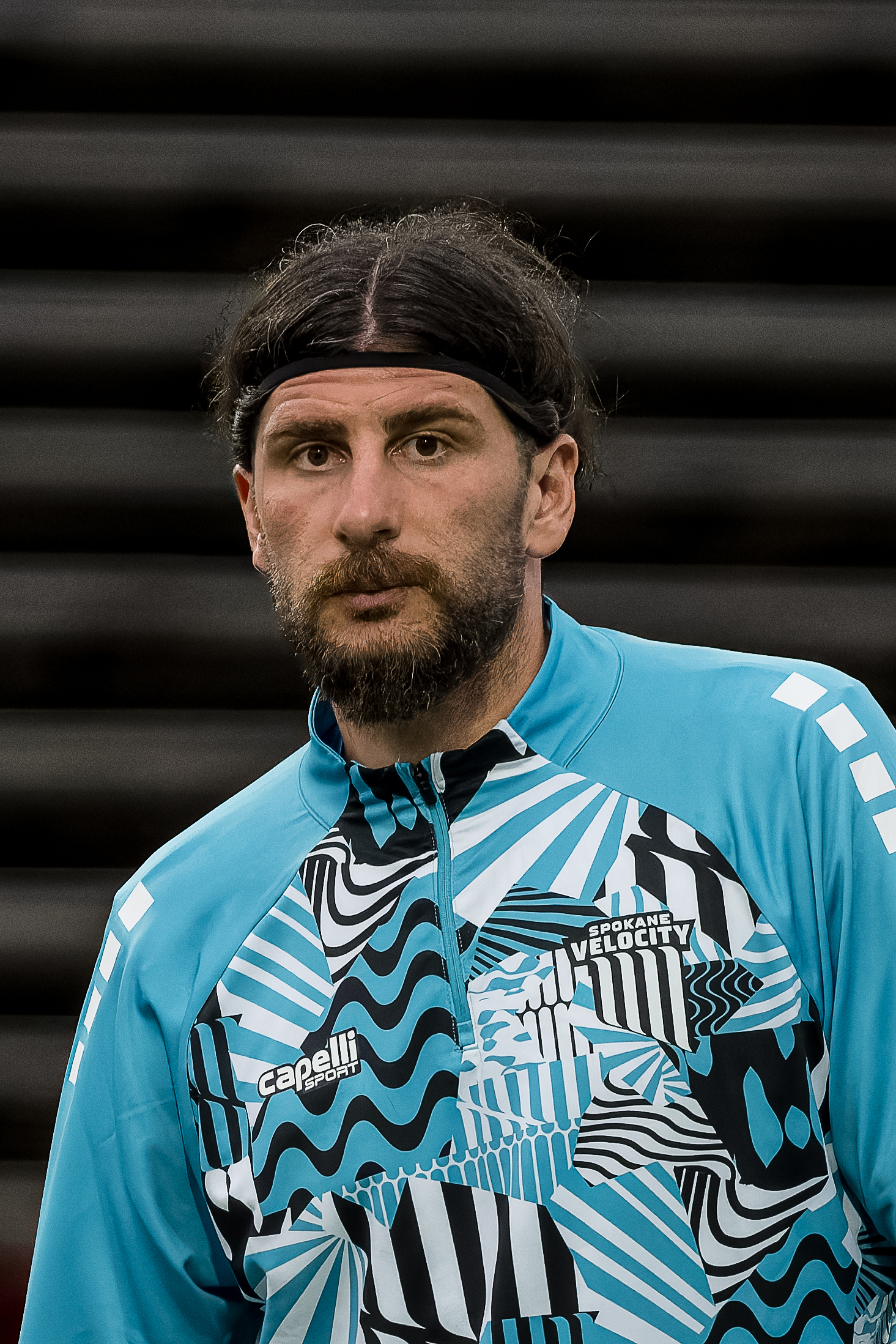
- Margvelashvili with Spokane Velocity in 2026

Personal information
- Date of birth: 30 October 1996 (age 30)
- Place of birth: Kutaisi, Georgia
- Height: 1.94 m (6 ft 4 in)
- Position: Centre-back

Team information
- Current team: Spokane Velocity
- Number: 5

Youth career
- –2013: Saburtalo Tbilisi

Senior career*
| Years | Team | Apps | (Gls) |
| 2013–2021 | Saburtalo Tbilisi | 148 | (11) |
| 2021 | Dinamo Batumi | 9 | (1) |
| 2022–2023 | Shkupi | 39 | (5) |
| 2023 | Dinamo Tbilisi | 0 | (0) |
| 2024–2025 | Oakland Roots | 49 | (2) |
| 2026– | Spokane Velocity | 16 | (0) |

International career^{‡}
| 2012–2013 | Georgia U17 | 8 | (0) |
| 2014–2015 | Georgia U19 | 11 | (1) |
| 2015–2018 | Georgia U21 | 17 | (0) |
- * Club domestic league appearances and goals as of 2 November 2026 ‡ National team caps and goals as of 12 October 2018

Gagi Margvelashvili (Georgian: გაგი მარგველაშვილი; born 30 October 1996) is a Georgian footballer who plays as a defender for USL League One club Spokane Velocity.

== Career ==
On January 28, 2022, Margevelashvili signed a two-year contract with the Macedonian First Football League club Shkupi. Margvelashvili completed one season with the MFFL, then signed with the Dinamo Tbilisi halfway through his second season. Margevelashvili returned to Erovnuli Liga in mid 2023, to play with the Dinamo Tbilisi.

On 5 January 2024, Margevelashvili signed with Oakland Roots in the American USL Championship.

== Career statistics ==
=== Club ===
As of match played 25 July 2023

Appearances and goals by club, season and competition
| Club | Season | League | | | National Cup | | Continental | | Other | | Total | |
| Club | Season | Division | Apps | Goals | Apps | Goals | Apps | Goals | Apps | Goals | Apps | Goals |
|---|---|---|---|---|---|---|---|---|---|---|---|---|
| Saburtalo Tbilisi | 2013 | Erovnuli Liga 2 | 1 | 1 | 0 | 0 | – | | – | | 1 | 1 |
| Saburtalo Tbilisi | 2014 | Erovnuli Liga 2 | 0 | 0 | 1 | 0 | – | | – | | 1 | 0 |
| Saburtalo Tbilisi | 2015 | Erovnuli Liga | 24 | 1 | 0 | 0 | – | | – | | 24 | 1 |
| Saburtalo Tbilisi | 2016 | Erovnuli Liga | 10 | 1 | 0 | 0 | – | | – | | 10 | 1 |
| Saburtalo Tbilisi | 2017 | Erovnuli Liga | 28 | 2 | 0 | 0 | – | | – | | 28 | 2 |
| Saburtalo Tbilisi | 2018 | Erovnuli Liga | 36 | 3 | 0 | 0 | – | | – | | 36 | 3 |
| Saburtalo Tbilisi | 2019 | Erovnuli Liga | 32 | 0 | 3 | 1 | 6 | 0 | 1 | 0 | 42 | 1 |
| Saburtalo Tbilisi | 2020 | Erovnuli Liga | 17 | 3 | 3 | 2 | 1 | 0 | 1 | 0 | 22 | 5 |
| Saburtalo Tbilisi | Total | | 148 | 11 | 7 | 3 | 7 | 0 | 2 | 0 | 164 | 14 |
| Dinamo Batumi | 2021 | Erovnuli Liga | 9 | 1 | 1 | 1 | 1 | 0 | – | | 11 | 2 |
| Shkupi | 2021–22 | 1. MFL | 14 | 1 | 0 | 0 | – | | – | | 14 | 1 |
| Shkupi | 2022–23 | 1. MFL | 25 | 4 | 0 | 0 | 7 | 0 | – | | 32 | 4 |
| Shkupi | Total | | 39 | 5 | 0 | 0 | 7 | 0 | — | | 46 | 5 |
| Dinamo Tbilisi | 2023 | Erovnuli Liga | 0 | 0 | 0 | 0 | 3 | 0 | 2 | 0 | 5 | 0 |
| Total | | | 196 | 17 | 8 | 4 | 18 | 0 | 4 | 0 | 226 | 21 |

== Honours ==
Saburtalo Tbilisi

- Erovnuli Liga (1): 2018
- Georgian Cup (1): 2019
- Georgian Super Cup (1): 2020

Dinamo Batumi

- Erovnuli Liga (1): 2021

Shkupi

- Macedonian First Football League (1): 2021–22
