= Irakoze Donasiyano =

Burundian footballer (born 1998)

Personal information
- Date of birth: 3 February 1998 (age 28)
- Place of birth: Kigoma Region, Tanzania
- Height: 5 ft 10 in (1.78 m)
- Positions: Winger; midfielder; fullback

Youth career
- Roanoke Star SC

College career
Years	Team	Apps	(Gls)
2017–2020	Virginia Cavaliers	65	(5)

Senior career*
Years	Team	Apps	(Gls)
2019	Daytona Rush	8	(2)
2021–2022	Nashville SC	1	(0)
2021	→ OKC Energy (loan)	1	(0)
2022	→ Phoenix Rising (loan)	14	(0)
2023–2024	Oakland Roots	43	(0)

International career^{‡}
2022–2024	Burundi	5	(0)
- * Club domestic league appearances and goals as of 30 March 2026 ‡ National team caps and goals as of 2 September 2026

Irakoze Donasiyano (born 3 February 1998) is a professional footballer who plays as a midfielder. Born in Tanzania, he plays for the Burundi national team.

== Career ==
=== Youth ===
Donasiyano played soccer at Patrick Henry High School, scoring 65 goals and tallying 30 assists in 69 games. During his high school career, he was a three-time First Team All-Conference selection, earned back-to-back All-Region and All-State honors in 2016 and 2017, and was named the 2017 Conference 16 and 5A North Region Player of the Year. He also played club soccer with local side Roanoke Star Soccer Club.

=== College and amateur ===
In 2017, Donasiyano attended the University of Virginia to play college soccer. In four seasons with the Cavaliers, included a truncated 2020 season due to the COVID-19 pandemic, Donasiyano made 65 appearances, scoring 5 goals and tallying 8 assists. In 2019, he was named a Third Team All-ACC selection. During his time at college, he played in multiple positions, including as a winger, central midfielder, and as either a fullback or wingback.

Whilst at college, Donasiyano also appeared for USL League Two side Daytona Rush SC during their 2019 season, scoring 2 goals in 8 regular season games.

=== Professional ===
On 21 January 2021, Donasiyano was selected 20th overall in the 2021 MLS SuperDraft by Nashville SC. He officially signed with the MLS club on 28 April.

Donasiyano made his professional debut on June 18, 2021, appearing as a 63rd-minute substitute during a 2–0 loss at New York Red Bulls.

On 14 August 2021, Donasiyano joined USL Championship side OKC Energy on loan for the remainder of the season.

Donasiyano was loaned to Phoenix Rising FC on 3 June 2022.

Following the 2022 season, his contract option was declined by Nashville. Donasiyano signed with USL Championship side Oakland Roots on 31 January 2023.

== International career ==
Donasiyano is of Burundian descent, and was called up to the Burundi national team for a set of friendlies in November 2022. He debuted with them in a friendly 4–0 loss to Ivory Coast on 16 November 2022.

== Personal ==
Born to a Burundian family in Muyovozi refugee camp in Tanzania's Kigoma Region, Donasiyano immigrated with his family from Tanzania to the United States in 2007. He became a United States citizen in January 2020.
