= Paul Blanchette =

American soccer player (born 1994)

Personal information
- Full name: Paul Angelo Blanchette
- Date of birth: April 16, 1994 (age 32)
- Place of birth: Palo Alto, California, U.S.
- Height: 6 ft 4 in (1.93 m)
- Position: Goalkeeper

Youth career
- De Anza Force

College career
Years	Team	Apps	(Gls)
2012–2015	Loyola Marymount Lions	47	(0)

Senior career*
Years	Team	Apps	(Gls)
2013	Portland Timbers U23s	1	(0)
2014–2015	Des Moines Menace	14	(0)
2016	Burlingame Dragons	3	(0)
2017	PEPO	18	(0)
2018	Santa Cruz Breakers	6	(0)
2019	New York Cosmos	10	(0)
2020	Rio Grande Valley FC	10	(0)
2021–2024	Oakland Roots	108	(0)
- * Club domestic league appearances and goals as of May 15, 2026

Paul Angelo Blanchette (born April 16, 1994) is an American soccer player.

== Career ==
=== College ===
Blanchette played four years of college soccer at Loyola Marymount University between 2012 and 2015.

=== Semi-professional ===
While at college, Blanchette appeared for USL PDL sides Portland Timbers U23s and Des Moines Menace.

Following college, Blanchette continued in the PDL with Burlingame Dragons for their 2016 season, before transferring to Finnish Kakkonen side PEPO Lappeenranta in January 2017.

In 2018, Blanchette returned to the PDL again, playing with Santa Cruz Breakers.

Blanchette spent 2019 with NPSL side New York Cosmos.

=== Professional ===
On March 7, 2020, Blanchette signed for USL Championship side Rio Grande Valley FC. He made his debut the following day, starting in a 1–5 loss to LA Galaxy II. RGVFC opted to decline their contact option on Blanchette following the 2020 season.

On July 6, 2021, Blanchette joined Oakland Roots SC.

In the 2023 Season, Blanchette earned 2nd Team All League honors as well as Oakland Roots SC Player of the Year.

He was out-of-contract following the 2024 season.
