= Memo Diaz =

American soccer player (born 1995)

Personal information
- Full name: Guillermo Fernando Diaz
- Date of birth: October 16, 1995 (age 31)
- Place of birth: Anthony, New Mexico, United States
- Height: 1.70 m (5 ft 7 in)
- Position: Wing-back

Team information
- Current team: El Paso Locomotive
- Number: 23

College career
Years	Team	Apps	(Gls)
2014–2015	Yavapai Roughriders	46	(25)
2016–2017	UNLV Rebels	44	(4)

Senior career*
Years	Team	Apps	(Gls)
2018	Laredo Heat	9	(5)
2019–2020	El Paso Locomotive	12	(0)
2021–2024	Oakland Roots	112	(5)
2025–	El Paso Locomotive	37	(2)
- * Club domestic league appearances and goals as of 21:06, 8 November 2026 (UTC)

Guillermo Fernando "Memo" Diaz (born October 16, 1995) is an American professional soccer player who plays as a midfielder for USL Championship club El Paso Locomotive.

== Career ==
=== College ===
Diaz began playing college soccer at Yavapai College in 2014, before moving to the University of Nevada, Las Vegas in 2016, where he played two further seasons of soccer.

=== Laredo Heat ===
Following college, Diaz played a season with National Premier Soccer League side Laredo Heat in 2018.

=== El Paso Locomotive (first stint) ===
On February 21, 2019, Diaz signed for USL Championship side El Paso Locomotive ahead of their inaugural season.

=== Oakland Roots ===
On January 11, 2021, Diaz joined Oakland Roots ahead of their inaugural season in the USL Championship.

=== El Paso Locomotive (second stint) ===
On December 11, 2024, it was announced that Diaz had signed back with El Paso after a couple years with Oakland, citing family reasons for the move.
