= Baboucarr Njie =

Gambian footballer (born 1995)

Personal information
- Date of birth: June 5, 1995 (age 31)
- Place of birth: Serekunda, The Gambia
- Height: 1.85 m (6 ft 1 in)
- Positions: Defender; midfielder

Team information
- Current team: Hartford Athletic

College career
Years	Team	Apps	(Gls)
2016–2019	NCWC Battling Bishops	57	(34)

Senior career*
Years	Team	Apps	(Gls)
2018	North Carolina FC U23	4	(0)
2020	Atlanta United 2	11	(0)
2021	Rio Grande Valley FC	26	(1)
2022–2023	Phoenix Rising	30	(1)
2023–2025	Oakland Roots	48	(3)
2025–	Hartford Athletic	34	(0)

International career^{‡}
2024–	Gambia	3	(0)
- * Club domestic league appearances and goals as of November 4, 2026 ‡ National team caps and goals as of July 12, 2026

Baboucarr Njie (born 5 June 1995) is a Gambian professional footballer who currently plays for Hartford Athletic and the Gambia national team.

== Club career ==
Njie played college soccer at North Carolina Wesleyan College for two consecutive seasons, skipping 2018 and returning for his junior year in 2019. During his time with the Battling Bishops, Njie made 57 appearances, scoring 34 goals and tallying 19 assists. During his 2018 season, Njie played in the USL PDL with North Carolina FC U23, where he made 4 appearances.

14 February 2020, it was announced that Njie would sign for USL Championship side Atlanta United 2. He made his debut for Atlanta on 29 July 2020, starting against The Miami FC.

Njie signed with USL Championship side Rio Grande Valley FC on 6 April 2021.

Njie signed with Phoenix Rising FC on 13 December 2021. Njie was traded to Oakland Roots on 27 July 2023 in exchange for Dariusz Formella. He was released by the Oakland Roots on 14 July, 2025, and subsequently signed by USL Championship side Hartford Athletic on 29 July, 2025.

== International career ==
Njie made his Gambia national team debut on 15 November 2024 in an Africa Cup of Nations qualifier against Comoros at the Berkane Municipal Stadium in Morocco. He substituted Ablie Jallow at half-time, as Comoros won 2–1.
