= Peter Wilson (footballer, born 1996) =

Liberian footballer (born 1996)

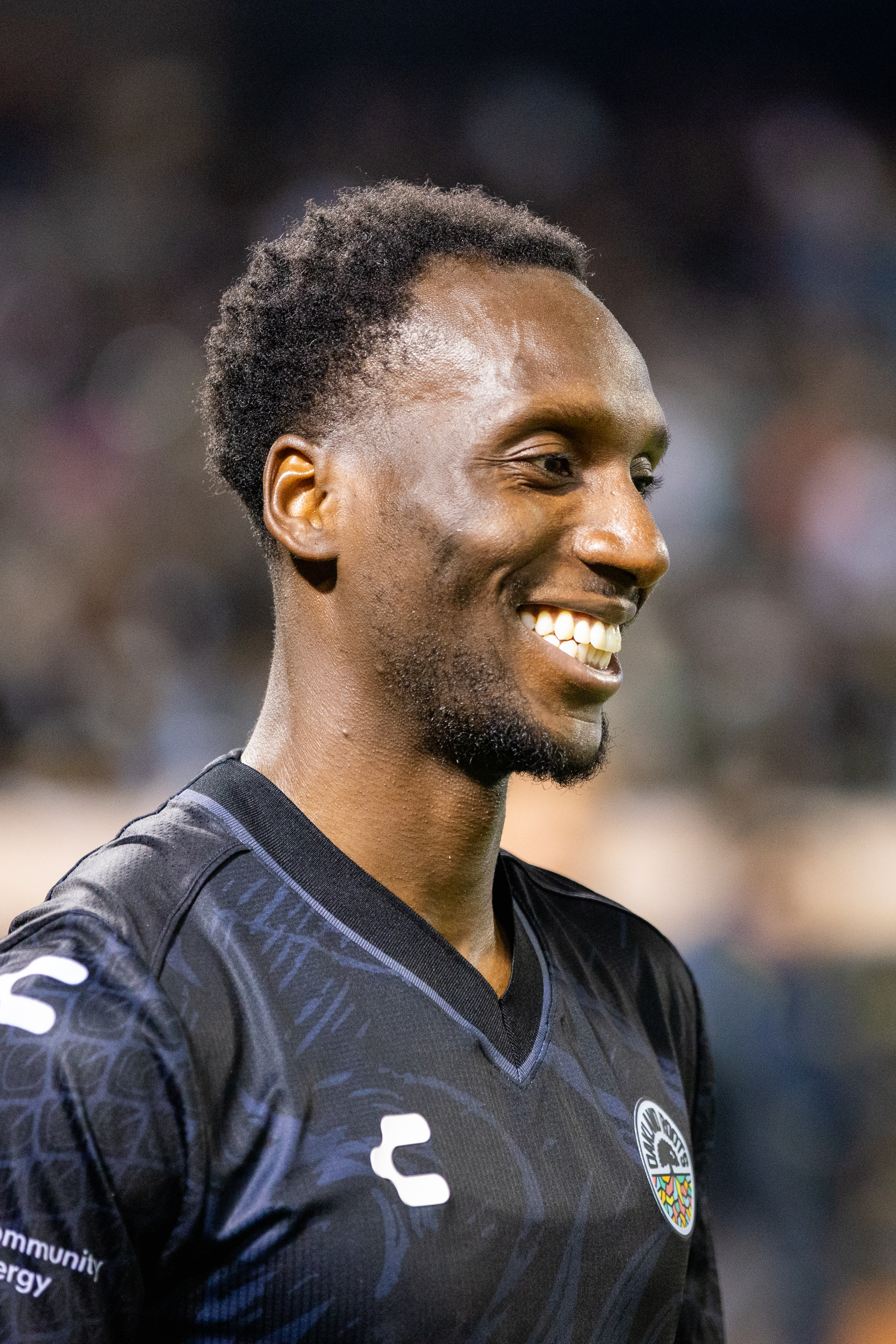

Personal information
- Date of birth: 9 October 1996 (age 30)
- Place of birth: Monrovia, Liberia
- Height: 1.82 m (6 ft 0 in)
- Position: Forward

Team information
- Current team: Oakland Roots
- Number: 9

Youth career
- –2014: GIF Sundsvall

Senior career*
Years	Team	Apps	(Gls)
2015–2020	GIF Sundsvall	93	(19)
2020–2021	Sheriff Tiraspol	17	(7)
2021	Podbeskidzie	13	(0)
2021–2022	Olympiakos Nicosia	27	(2)
2022–2025	Jerv	38	(21)
2025–	Oakland Roots	54	(33)

International career^{‡}
2016	Sweden U19	2	(0)
2019–	Liberia	21	(2)
- * Club domestic league appearances and goals as of 10:57, 10 November 2026 (UTC) ‡ National team caps and goals as of 19:16, 29 September 2026 (UTC)

Peter Wilson (born 9 October 1996) is a Liberian professional footballer who plays as a forward for USL Championship club Oakland Roots and the Liberian national team.

== Early life ==
Although born in Liberia, Wilson grew up in Sweden, where his family moved when he was three years old.

== Career ==
=== Club ===
As a youth, Wilson played for GIF Sundsvall, where he started playing for the senior team in 2016. In 2020, he moved to Sheriff Tiraspol. On 4 February 2021, Wilson signed a six-month contract with Polish club Podbeskidzie Bielsko-Biała.

On 29 January 2025, after spending three years in Norway, Wilson moved to the United States to play for Oakland Roots SC.

=== International ===
Wilson represented Sweden at the under-15, under-16, and under-19 levels. He made his debut for Liberia against Chad on 9 October 2019.

== Career statistics ==
=== International ===
As of match played 29 September 2026

Liberia
Year	Apps	Goals
2019	2	0
2021	6	2
2022	2	0
2023	2	0
2024	6	0
2026	4	0
Total	22	2

Scores and results list Liberia's goal tally first, score column indicates score after each Wilson goal.

List of international goals scored by Peter Wilson
No.	Date	Venue	Opponent	Score	Result	Competition
1	16 November 2022	Tangier Grand Stadium, Tangier, Morocco	Central African Republic	1–0	3–1	2022 FIFA World Cup qualification
2	16 November 2022	Tangier Grand Stadium, Tangier, Morocco	Central African Republic	3–1	3–1	2022 FIFA World Cup qualification

== Honours ==
Individual

- USL Championship Golden Boot: 2025
