= Noah Delgado =

Puerto Rican soccer player (born 1979)

Personal information
- Date of birth: December 30, 1979 (age 46)
- Place of birth: Fremont, California, United States
- Height: 1.78 m (5 ft 10 in)
- Position: Midfielder

College career
Years	Team	Apps	(Gls)
1998–2001	Fresno State Bulldogs		

Senior career*
Years	Team	Apps	(Gls)
2002	Portland Timbers	5	(0)
2003	Syracuse Salty Dogs	17	(1)
2004	Rochester Raging Rhinos	23	(1)
2005–2012	Puerto Rico Islanders	174	(16)
2014	San Francisco Stompers		

International career
2008–2012	Puerto Rico	25	(9)

Managerial career
- 2021–2022: Oakland Roots (assistant)
- 2021–2022: El Salvador (assistant)
- 2022: Oakland Roots (interim)
- 2022–2024: Oakland Roots
- * Club domestic league appearances and goals

Noah Delgado (born December 30, 1979) is a former professional soccer player and coach. He has been a member of the El Salvador national team Gold Cup staff and 2020 World Cup Qualifying.

== Club career ==
=== High school and college ===
Delgado was born in Fremont, California. He attended Irvington High School, where he was a member of the school's soccer team during his four years, and was also a kicker for their football team for two years. The team was North Coast Section champs during his junior and senior seasons. He played college soccer at Fresno State University, scoring 28 goals and registering 20 assists in 76 games during his four seasons at the school.

=== Professional ===
Delgado was drafted by the Los Angeles Galaxy of the MLS in the fourth round (48th overall) of the 2002 MLS SuperDraft, but was not offered a contract with the team. In 2002, he played five games for the Portland Timbers in the USL A-League. In 2003, he played for Syracuse Salty Dogs, and then for Rochester Raging Rhinos in 2004.

Delgado joined the Puerto Rico Islanders in 2005, being one of only two players to play in all of the 28 games of the season. Since then he has become a key figure in the Islanders' midfield. In 2008, he was named co-captain, an honor he shares with Petter Villegas. In 2008, he led the Islanders to the USL-1 Finals and the CONCACAF Champions League Quarter-finals. He became captain of the Puerto Rico Islanders for the 2009 season and remains the captain for the 2010 and 2011 seasons. Delgado re-signed with the Islanders for the 2011 season on March 24, 2011.

In 2014, Delgado played for the San Francisco Stompers of the NPSL.

== International career ==
Delgado was eligible to play for the Puerto Rico national team after living and playing in the island for a couple of years. He was called up in 2008 for friendlies against Bermuda. He played on the team from 2008 to 2012 earning a total of 23 caps.

== Coaching career ==
Delgado was named head coach of Oakland Roots in the USL Championship in December 2022. Delgado and the Roots parted ways in April 2024.

== See also ==
- List of Puerto Ricans
