= Raphael Spiegel =

Swiss footballer (born 1992)

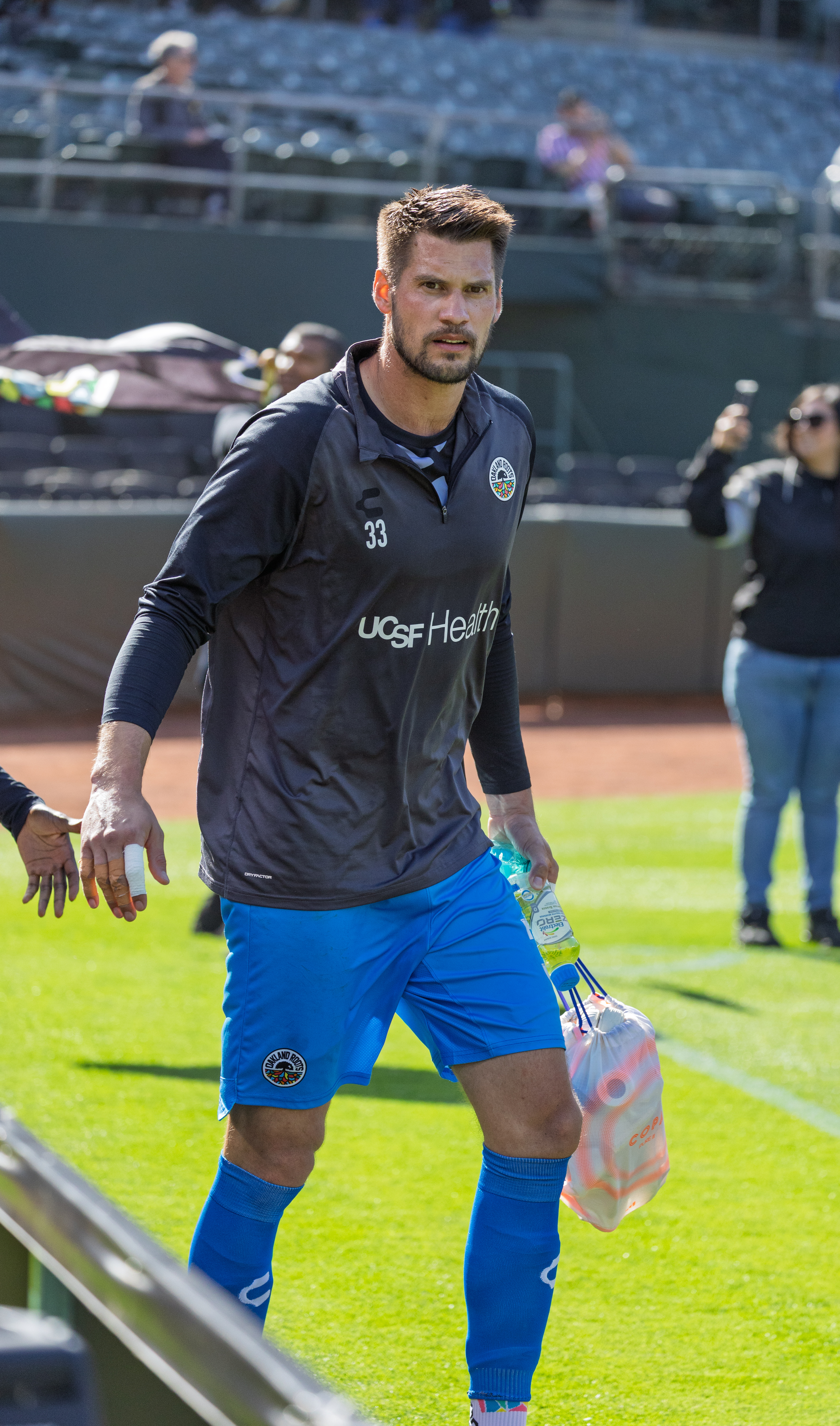
- Spiegel with the Oakland Roots in 2026

Personal information
- Full name: Raphael Simon Spiegel
- Date of birth: 19 December 1992 (age 33)
- Place of birth: Rüttenen, Switzerland
- Height: 1.97 m (6 ft 5 1/2 in)
- Position: Goalkeeper

Team information
- Current team: Oakland Roots
- Number: 33

Youth career
- 2001–2007: Rüttenen
- 2007–2009: Grasshopper

Senior career*
Years	Team	Apps	(Gls)
2009–2011	Grasshopper II	41	(0)
2010–2012	Grasshopper	0	(0)
2011	→ Wil (loan)	0	(0)
2011–2012	→ Brühl (loan)	17	(0)
2012–2017	West Ham United	0	(0)
2014	→ Crawley Town (loan)	0	(0)
2014	→ Barnet (loan)	1	(0)
2015	→ Carlisle United (loan)	2	(0)
2017–2018	Boavista	0	(0)
2018–2022	Winterthur	108	(0)
2022–2024	Lausanne-Sport	7	(0)
2025–	Oakland Roots	18	(0)

International career^{‡}
2008–2009	Switzerland U17	2	(0)
2010–2011	Switzerland U19	5	(0)
2013	Switzerland U21	3	(0)
- * Club domestic league appearances and goals as of 10:59, 10 November 2026 (UTC) ‡ National team caps and goals as of 14:18, 15 October 2013 (UTC)

Raphael Simon Spiegel (born 19 December 1992) is a Swiss professional footballer who plays as a goalkeeper who currently plays for Oakland Roots in the USL Championship.

== Club career ==
=== Early career in Switzerland ===
Spiegel began his early career with hometown club FC Rüttenen before being snapped up by Swiss Super League-side Grasshopper Club of Zürich in August 2007. At Grasshopper, he rose through the youth ranks at the club, soon playing regularly for the reserves. He was unable to establish himself in their first team and was sent out on a short loan to FC Wil early in the 2011–2012 season though he did not make an appearance for the team. Spiegel returned to Grasshopper only to be sent on loan again, this time to SC Brühl for the rest of the season. He made his debut for Brühl on 6 November 2011 against FC Locarno in a 2–1 away loss. After a successful run in the first team during his loan at Brühl, Spiegel returned to Grasshopper.

=== West Ham United and loans ===
On 23 July 2012, Spiegel signed for West Ham United after their return to the English Premier League, for an undisclosed fee. After joining West Ham United, Spiegel featured in games for the Under-21 squad and was a reserve goalkeeper, working as an understudy to Jussi Jääskeläinen and Adrián.

On 18 July 2014 he signed for Crawley Town on a one-month loan deal until 16 August 2014 before returning to West Ham without having played for Crawley. On 25 November 2014 he signed on a one-month loan for Barnet making his debut the same day in a 2–1 away defeat to Bristol Rovers. This was his only appearance before his loan spell was cut short due to injury.

On 20 February 2015 Spiegel signed for Carlisle United on an initial one-month loan deal. He made his debut the following day in a 3–2 home defeat by Wycombe Wanderers. He returned to West Ham on 23 March 2015 having made two appearances for Carlisle.

Spiegel was part of the West Ham U23 team that won promotion to the Premier League 2 Division 1 via the 2016-17 Play Offs, defeating Newcastle United U23s in the final.

=== Boavista ===
It was announced in June 2017 that Spiegel's contract with West Ham would be terminated by mutual consent. A few days later he signed with Portuguese Primeira Liga team Boavista.

=== Lausanne-Sport ===
On 9 June 2022, Spiegel signed with Lausanne-Sport.

=== Oakland Roots ===
On 11 March 2025, Spiegel signed with US side Oakland Roots who play in the second-tier USL Championship.

== Career statistics ==
As of match played 13 April 2025

Appearances and goals by club, season and competition
Club	Season	League			National cup (Note: Includes Swiss Cup, FA Cup, Taça de Portugal, U.S. Open Cup)		League cup (Note: Includes EFL Cup, Taça da Liga, USL Cup)		Continental		Other		Total	
Club	Season	Division	Apps	Goals	Apps	Goals	Apps	Goals	Apps	Goals	Apps	Goals	Apps	Goals
Grasshopper	2009-10	Swiss Super League	0	0	0	0	—		—		—		0	0
Grasshopper	2010-11	Swiss Super League	0	0	0	0	—		0	0	—		0	0
Grasshopper	2011-12	Swiss Super League	0	0	0	0	—		—		—		0	0
Grasshopper	Total		0	0	0	0	—		0	0	—		0	0
Wil (loan)	2011-12	Swiss Challenge League	0	0	0	0	—		—		—		0	0
Brühl (loan)	2011-12	Swiss Challenge League	17	0	0	0	—		—		—		17	0
West Ham United	2012-13	Premier League	0	0	0	0	0	0	—		—		0	0
West Ham United	2013-14	Premier League	0	0	0	0	0	0	—		—		0	0
West Ham United	2014-15	Premier League	0	0	0	0	0	0	—		—		0	0
West Ham United	2015-16	Premier League	0	0	0	0	0	0	0	0	—		0	0
West Ham United	2016-17	Premier League	0	0	0	0	0	0	0	0	—		0	0
West Ham United	Total		0	0	0	0	0	0	0	0	—		0	0
Crawley Town (loan)	2014-15	League One	0	0	0	0	0	0	—		0	0	0	0
Barnet (loan)	2014-15	Conference Premier	1	0	0	0	—		—		0	0	1	0
Carlisle United (loan)	2014-15	League Two	2	0	0	0	0	0	—		0	0	2	0
West Ham U23	2016-17	—			—		—		—		2 (Note: Appearance(s) in EFL Trophy)	0	2	0
Boavista	2017-18	Primeira Liga	0	0	0	0	0	0	—		—		0	0
Winterthur	2018-19	Swiss Challenge League	35	0	2	0	—		—		—		37	0
Winterthur	2019-20	Swiss Challenge League	36	1	4	0	—		—		—		40	1
Winterthur	2020-21	Swiss Challenge League	2	0	0	0	—		—		—		2	0
Winterthur	2021-22	Swiss Challenge League	35	0	1	0	—		—		—		36	0
Winterthur	Total		108	1	7	0	—		—		—		115	1
Lausanne-Sport	2022-23	Swiss Challenge League	7	0	2	0	—		—		—		9	0
Lausanne-Sport	2023-24	Swiss Super League	0	0	0	0	—		—		—		0	0
Lausanne-Sport	Total		7	0	2	0	—		—		—		9	0
Oakland Roots	2025	USL Championship	0	0	0	0	0	0	—		—		0	0
Career total			135	1	9	0	0	0	0	0	2	0	146	1

== International career ==
Spiegel was a Switzerland youth international. In 2009, he was part of the Swiss under-17 team that won the 2009 FIFA U-17 World Cup beating the host nation Nigeria 1–0 in the final. He remained an unused substitute throughout the tournament though, unable to displace Swiss first choice Benjamin Siegrist who would go on to win the Golden Glove.

== Honours ==
- FIFA U-17 World Cup: 2009
