= Anuar Peláez =

Colombian footballer (born 1993)

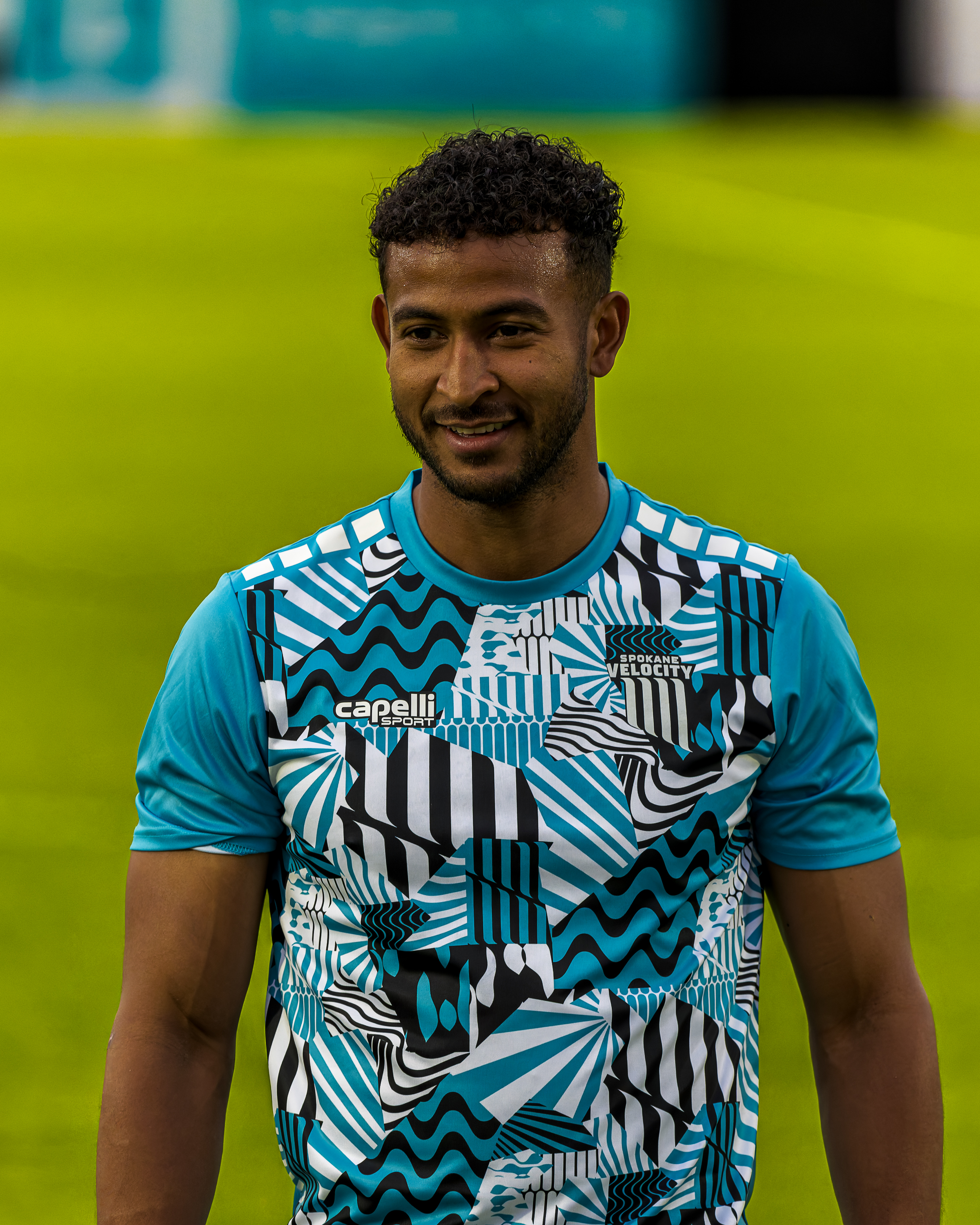
- Peláez with Spokane Velocity in 2026

Personal information
- Full name: Anuar José Peláez Paba
- Date of birth: 1 February 1993 (age 33)
- Place of birth: Maicao, Colombia
- Height: 1.86 m (6 ft 1 in)
- Position: Forward

Team information
- Current team: Spokane Velocity
- Number: 16

Youth career
- 2010–2013: Barranquilla

Senior career*
Years	Team	Apps	(Gls)
2017	Atlético Guanare		(4)
2018	Hermanos Colmenarez		(7)
2020–2022	Hermanos Colmenarez	64	(23)
2023	Oakland Roots	34	(8)
2024	Guastatoya	16	(2)
2024–	Spokane Velocity	47	(13)
- * Club domestic league appearances and goals as of 13:00, 2 November 2026 (UTC)

Anuar José Peláez Paba (born 1 February 1993) is a Colombian footballer for plays as a center forward for Spokane Vecloity in USL League One.

== Career ==
Peláez began his career with the academy at Colombian side Barranquilla, but was released by the club in 2013. He subsequently failed to find another club and started studying law at university and working odd jobs. In 2016, he was invited to play with third-division Venezuelan side Atlético Guanare, but couldn't register with them until 2017. He played one season with Guanare and scored four goals. After a trial with Hermanos Colmenarez, he played with the club in 2018, but left at the end of the season. Again, after working back home in Colombia, he was invited back to Colmenarez in 2020. He went on to score 24 goals in over 61 appearances, before signing with USL Championship side Oakland Roots on 2 February 2023.

Peláez signed with USL League One club Spokane Velocity on 9 August 2024.
