= Julian Bravo =

American soccer player (born 2000)

Personal information
- Date of birth: September 30, 2000 (age 26)
- Place of birth: Claremont, California, United States
- Height: 1.88 m (6 ft 2 in)
- Position: Defender

Team information
- Current team: Oakland Roots SC
- Number: 23

Youth career
- 2016–2018: FC Golden State

College career
Years	Team	Apps	(Gls)
2018–2021	Santa Clara Broncos	55	(4)

Senior career*
Years	Team	Apps	(Gls)
2022–2023	Portland Timbers 2	46	(2)
2022	Portland Timbers	0	(0)
2024	Crown Legacy FC	0	(0)
2025–	Oakland Roots SC	40	(1)
- * Club domestic league appearances and goals as of October 31, 2026

Julian Bravo (born September 30, 2000) is an American professional soccer player who plays as a defender for USL Championship club Oakland Roots SC.

== Career ==
=== Youth and college ===
Bravo attended Claremont High School in Claremont, California, where he helped lead the team to league championship in the Palomares Conference during his sophomore season. While at high school, Bravo also played club soccer at FC Golden State between 2016 and 2018, making 26 appearances for the team.

In 2018, Bravo committed to playing college soccer at Santa Clara University. In four seasons with the Broncos, Bravo made 55 appearances, scoring four goals and tallying six assists.

=== Professional ===
On January 11, 2022, Bravo was selected 55th overall in the 2022 MLS SuperDraft by Portland Timbers. On March 28, 2022, it was announced that Bravo had signed with Portland's MLS Next Pro side Portland Timbers 2 for their upcoming season. On May 10, 2022, Bravo signed a short-term deal with the Timbers first team ahead of their Lamar Hunt U.S. Open Cup fixture against Los Angeles FC, where he appeared as an 89th-minute substitute during a 2–0 loss. He finished 2022 with 19 appearances for Timbers 2, where he finished with a single assist.

Bravo signed with Charlotte FC's MLS Next Pro side Crown Legacy FC on January 25, 2024.

Bravo signed with USL Championship side Oakland Roots SC on February 20, 2025.
