= Wolfgang Prentice =

American soccer player (born 2000)

Personal information
- Date of birth: April 25, 2000 (age 26)
- Place of birth: Redondo Beach, California, United States
- Height: 1.83 m (6 ft 0 in)
- Positions: Forward; winger; attacking midfielder

Team information
- Current team: Oakland Roots
- Number: 7

Youth career
- Crescenta Valley SC
- –2013: West Coast FC
- 2013–2014: LA Galaxy
- 2014–2016: Pateadores
- 2016–2018: Real So Cal

College career
Years	Team	Apps	(Gls)
2018–2019	CSUN Matadors	35	(4)

Senior career*
Years	Team	Apps	(Gls)
2019	FC Golden State Force	0	(0)
2021	San Diego 1904	16	(1)
2022–	Oakland Roots	87	(17)
2022	→ Northern Colorado Hailstorm (loan)	12	(1)
2023	→ Forward Madison (loan)	9	(1)
2024	→ Forward Madison (loan)	21	(3)
- * Club domestic league appearances and goals as of October 31, 2026

Wolfgang Prentice (born April 25, 2000) is an American soccer player who plays for USL Championship club Oakland Roots.

== Career ==
=== Youth ===
Prentice attended high school at both Redondo Union High School and Rancho Del Mar High School, where he graduated. Prentice also played club soccer for state teams including LA Galaxy, Pateadores, and Real So Cal.

=== College ===
In 2018, Prentice attended California State University, Northridge to play college soccer. He played two seasons with the Matadors, making 35 appearances, scoring four goals and tallying five assists. In his freshman season he was named to the Big West Conference All-Freshman team.

In 2019, Prentice was part of the FC Golden State Force teams in the USL League Two and NPSL, but did not make a first team appearance in either league.

=== Professional ===
In 2020, Prentice had trials with both Orange County SC and New York Cosmos, but did not sign with either club.

Prentice signed his first professional contract with NISA side San Diego 1904 in 2021, going on to make 16 league appearances and scoring a single goal.

Prentice joined USL Championship club Oakland Roots on March 11, 2022. He debuted for the club on April 3, 2022, appearing as a 76th–minute substitute during a 2–0 loss to Greenville Triumph in the US Open Cup.

Prentice joined Northern Colorado Hailstorm in USL League One on a loan for the remainder of the 2022 season.

On April 4, 2023, Prentice scored two goals for the Oakland Roots in the second round of the Lamar Hunt Open Cup to help them advance to the third round.

On April 10, 2023, Forward Madison announced that it had signed Prentice on loan from Oakland Roots for the 2023 season.

Oakland recalled Prentice on June 15, 2023. He had appeared in nine matches, with two starts and one goal.

Prior to the 2024 season, Prentice was again sent on loan from Oakland to Forward Madison.
