= Cardinale Stadium =

Soccer stadium in Monterey County, California

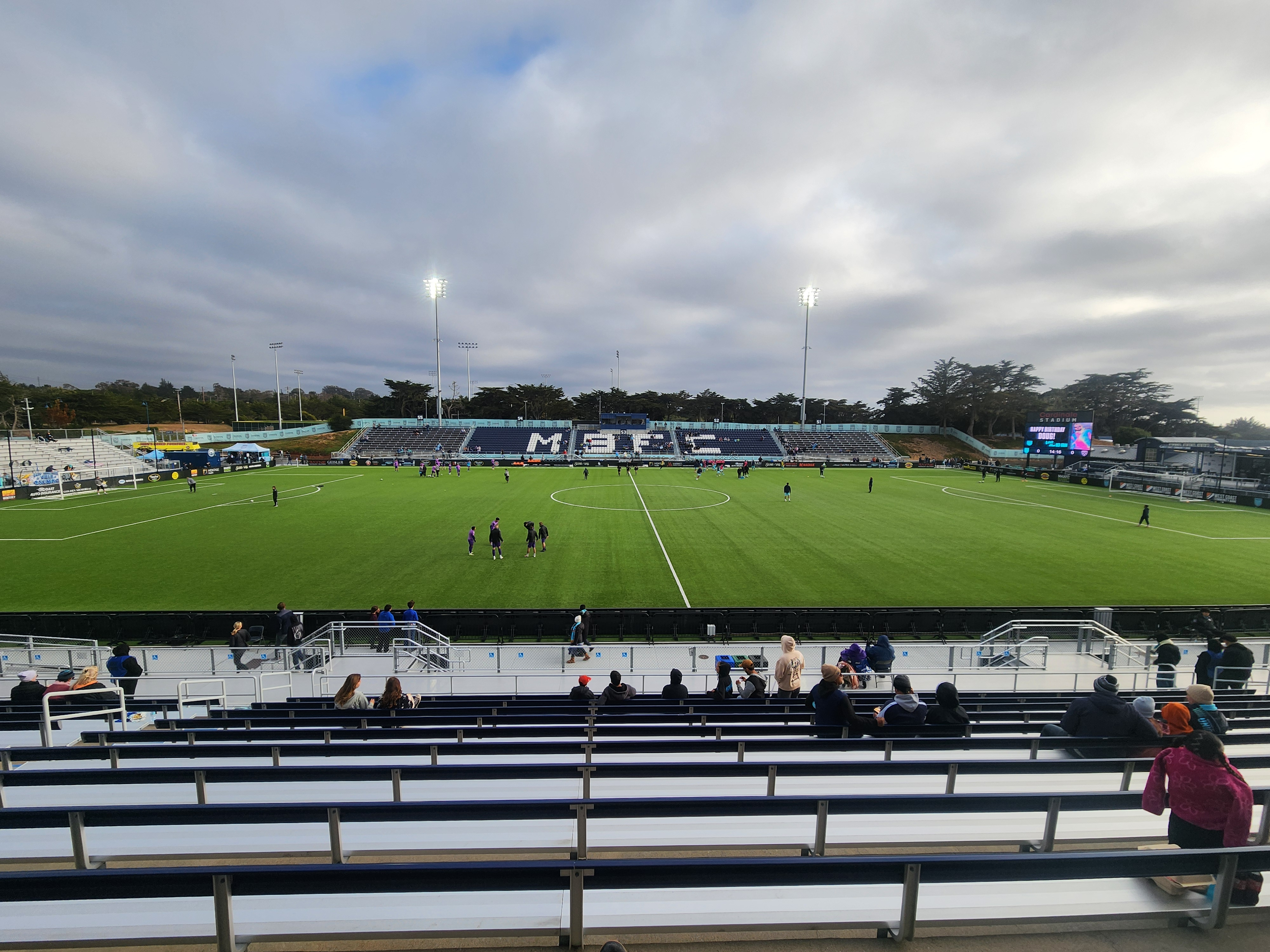
- Cardinale Stadium in Seaside, California
- Interactive map of Cardinale Stadium
- Former names: Freeman Stadium
- Address: 4441 2nd Avenue; Seaside, California 93955
- Coordinates: 36°39′3″N 121°48′18″W
- Owner: Ray Beshoff
- Operator: Monterey Bay FC
- Capacity: 6,000
- Surface: AstroTurf
- Field size: 116 yd × 75 yd (106 m × 69 m)

Construction
- Groundbreaking: September 16, 2021
- Opened: May 7, 2022
- Architect: HOK
- General contractor: Otto Construction

Tenants
- Monterey Bay FC (USLC) (2022–present); CSUMB Otters Soccer (NCAA DII) (2022–present); Monterey Bay FC 2 (USL2) (2023–2025); Monterey Bay Sirens (USLW) (2026–present)

Cardinale Stadium is a soccer-specific stadium on the campus of California State University, Monterey Bay in Seaside, California. Initially constructed as Warriors Stadium for Fort Ord, it was subsequently renamed Freeman Stadium (sometimes referred to as Freeman Field) and became part of CSUMB upon the university's establishment in 1994. The stadium was renovated in 2021 by the ownership of USL Championship club Monterey Bay FC.

Since the stadium's opening in 2022 it has been the home of Monterey Bay FC of the USL Championship and the men's and women's CSUMB Otters soccer teams who compete in the California Collegiate Athletic Association. Monterey Bay Sirens of the USL W League began play in the stadium in 2026. Monterey Bay FC 2 of USL League Two formerly played in the stadium, first on a part-time basis in 2023, before becoming their full-time home in their final season in 2025.

== History ==
=== Fort Ord and CSUMB era ===
The modern US military presence in Seaside, California, began in 1917 as Gigling Reservation was purchased by the US Army for artillery and cavalry training. In 1933 the Reservation was renamed Camp Ord and subsequently redesignated as Fort Ord in 1940. The following year the Presidio Dons American football team began play, a semi-pro football team made up of servicemen from the Fort. The team would train and play on nearby fields and play against other military teams.

As the population of Fort Ord grew, there was a push for more permanent athletic facilities. A football stadium with surrounding track was opened in 1951. It was initially called Warriors Stadium, with the Presidio Dons changing their name to the Fort Ord Warriors. In the 1950s the Warriors played such teams as the Los Angeles Rams and the San Francisco 49ers. The stadium also hosted an Army sponsored Canned Heat concert in June 1971, which subsequently lead to a riot between VOLAR soldiers and Fort Ord military police officers. The stadium eventually took on the name Freeman Stadium. Fort Ord was closed in 1994 and some of the land, including the stadium, became the home of California State University, Monterey Bay. The stadium fell out of athletic use, as the university did not use the stadium for soccer and stopped using the surrounding track for hosting track and field events around the year 2000. The field was eventually paved over and only utilized by the university for graduation commencement ceremonies.

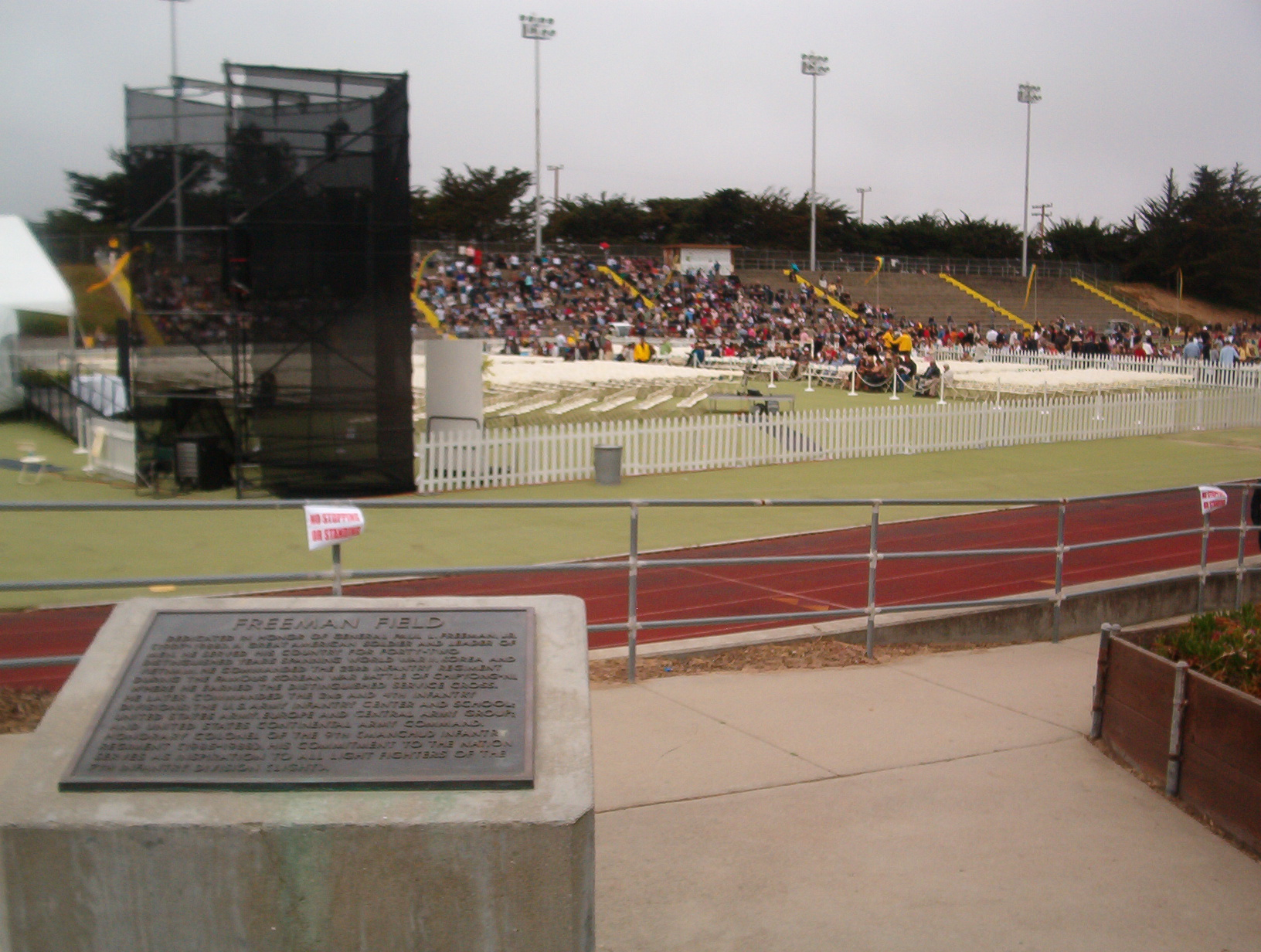
Freeman Stadium in 2007, prior to later renovations.

=== Monterey Bay FC era ===
American second division soccer league USL Championship announced on February 1, 2021, that Monterey Bay FC would join for the 2022 league season. This announcement also shared that Monterey Bay FC would be playing on the campus of CSUMB, renovating the former Freeman stadium. Ground breaking for the stadium renovations took place on September 16, 2021. The team entered into a multi-year partnership with the Cardinale Automotive Group for the stadium naming rights.

The stadium opened on May 7, 2022, when Monterey Bay defeated Las Vegas Lights FC 1–0 on a goal by Walmer Martinez in the 56th minute. The CSUMB women's and men's soccer teams would open their tenures at the stadium on August 25th and September 1st respectively. The newly renovated stadium hosted its first and so far only weekend of commencement ceremonies in May 2022, as CSUMB transitioned to hosting a single large ceremony at the Salinas Sports Complex starting in 2023.

Monterey Bay FC established a development team in the amateur USL League Two in 2023. The team was primarily based in Salinas at Rabobank Stadium in their inaugural season, but played two of their six home matches at Cardinale Stadium. The next season MBFC2 would play four of their seven home matches in Seaside, with the rest in Salinas. Ahead of the 2025 USL League Two season, MBFC2 moved to Cardinale Stadium as their full-time home. The team departed League Two ahead of the 2026 season.

In November 2023 the stadium hosted the 2023 California Collegiate Athletic Association Women's Soccer Championship, the first time CSUMB hosted the tournament in their two decades in the conference dating back to 2004. The stadium once again was host to the CCAA Soccer Championship, this time hosting both the men's and women's tournaments, the first time since 2019 that both events were hosted at the same venue.

In March 2025 Monterey Bay FC and CSUMB announced a proposal for upgrades to the facilities in and around the stadium to allow the stadium to host more events. This includes permanent men's and women's locker rooms, which would allow for Monterey Bay to potentially field a team in one or both of the professional USL Super League and pre-professional USL W League.

A new tenant was announced in early 2026, with Monterey Bay FC announcing a women's team set to play in the USL W League. Monterey Bay Sirens played their first regular season match on May 9, 2026, in a 1-1 draw with Stockton Cargo SC.

== Non-soccer events ==
After CSUMB's establishment, then Freeman Stadium was primarily used for commencement ceremonies. The renovated Cardinale Stadium hosted its only CSUMB commencement ceremony in May 2022.

Cardinale Stadium was scheduled to host "The Winter Jam", its first ever concert, on December 13, 2024. However the concert was eventually cancelled. The stadium would host its first ever concert the following year on August 30, 2025, headlined by Banda el Recodo.

== Features ==
The stadium features a capacity of 6,000 and an AstroTurf surface. Monterey Bay FC partnered with Alvarado Street Brewery to construct a 5,000 square foot beer garden on the eastern side of the stadium.
