= Johnny Rodriguez (soccer) =

American soccer player (born 1998)

Personal information
- Full name: Jonathan Rodriguez
- Date of birth: June 13, 1998 (age 28)
- Place of birth: Fresno, California, United States
- Height: 6 ft 0 in (1.83 m)
- Position: Striker

Team information
- Current team: Las Vegas Lights
- Number: 14

Youth career
- 2012–2016: Washington Union High School

College career
Years	Team	Apps	(Gls)
2016–2017	Fresno CC Rams	48	(45)
2017–2020	CSUN Matadors	36	(13)

Senior career*
Years	Team	Apps	(Gls)
2018	Fresno FC U23	9	(2)
2019	Ventura County Fusion	11	(7)
2020–2024	Oakland Roots	112	(31)
2025–	Las Vegas Lights	59	(21)
- * Club domestic league appearances and goals as of 10:20, 9 November 2026 (UTC)

Jonathan "Johnny" Rodriguez (born June 13, 1998) is an American professional soccer player who plays as a striker for USL Championship club Las Vegas Lights.

== Career ==
Rodriguez played six games in the 2020–21 NISA season, scoring two goals in the play-offs for Oakland Roots. He made his USL Championship debut on 18 August 2021 in a 1–1 draw with New Mexico United, coming on as a substitute. He made another substitute appearance against Las Vegas Lights FC on 21 August 2021.

== Personal life ==
Rodriguez was born in Fresno, California on 13 June 1998 to Alfonso Rodriguez and Raquel Gaytan. He was a liberal studies and interdisciplinary studies major at Cal State University at Northridge. According to the CSUN website, “the best advice has been given is to ‘keep your head up’ [and] his advice to young people is to ‘keep working hard and never give up’”. Also according to the CSUN website, “his greatest heroes are his parents”.
