= Neveal Hackshaw =

Trinidadian footballer (born 1995)

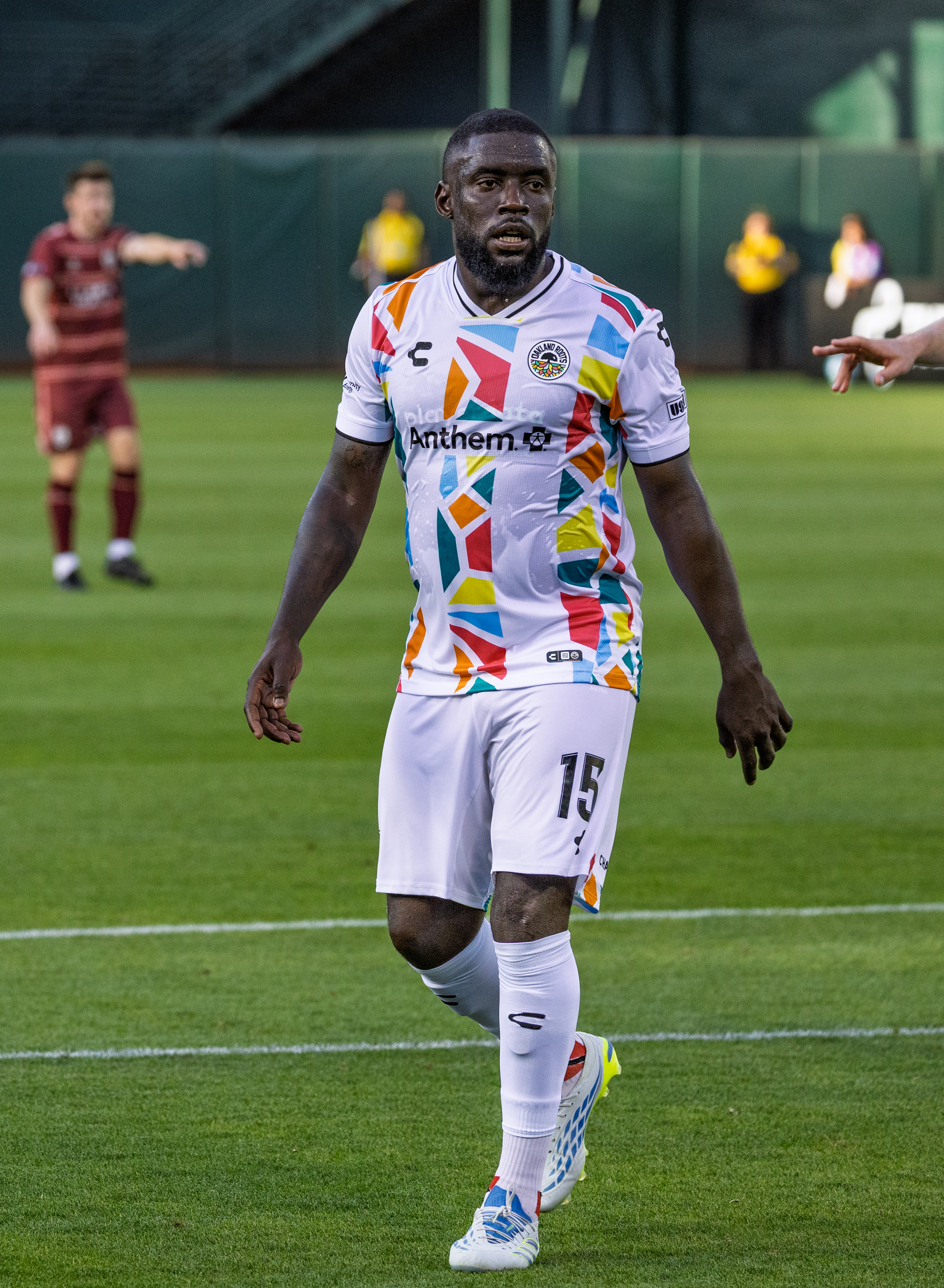
- Hackshaw with the Oakland Roots in 2026

Personal information
- Full name: Neveal Hackshaw
- Date of birth: 21 September 1995 (age 31)
- Place of birth: La Horquetta, Trinidad and Tobago
- Height: 1.85 m (6 ft 1 in)
- Position: Defender

Team information
- Current team: Oakland Roots
- Number: 15

Youth career
- 2010: Joe Public
- 2010–2012: Arima North Secondary

Senior career*
Years	Team	Apps	(Gls)
2011–2015	North East Stars		(3)
2016–2018	Charleston Battery	73	(1)
2019–2022	Indy Eleven	88	(7)
2023–	Oakland Roots	103	(4)

International career^{‡}
2015	Trinidad and Tobago U20	8	(0)
2015–	Trinidad and Tobago	28	(2)
- * Club domestic league appearances and goals as of 31 October 2026 ‡ National team caps and goals as of 10 June 2022

Neveal Hackshaw (born 21 September 1995) is a Trinidadian professional footballer who plays as a defender for Oakland Roots and the Trinidad and Tobago national team.

== Career ==
=== Youth and college ===
Hackshaw played on the collegiate level at Arima North Secondary.

=== Professional ===
Hackshaw played for North East Stars F.C. in the TT Pro League since season 2014/2015 and scored 2 goals in his first season.

In 2016, Hackshaw signed with American club Charleston Battery.

On 13 December 2018, Hackshaw was signed by Indy Eleven. He was released by Indy Eleven on November 30, 2022, following the conclusion of the 2022 season.

On 23 February 2023, Hackshaw joined USL Championship side Oakland Roots.

== International career ==
Hackshaw made his debut in the Under-20 squad on 10 January 2015.

Hackshaw made his debut for Trinidad and Tobago national football team on 27 March 2015. He came in as a substitute for Tobago-born Kevan George in the one-legged Copa América Centenario qualifying play-offs in the 78th minute where he played against Haiti. However only 5 minutes after Hackshaw came into the line-up T&T conceded the only goal of the match.

List of international goals scored by Neveal Hackshaw
Number	Date	Venue	Team	Score	Result	Competition
1	7 June 2022	Hasely Crawford Stadium, Port of Spain, Trinidad and Tobago	Bahamas	1–0	1–0	2022–23 CONCACAF Nations League B
2	10 June 2022	Arnos Vale Stadium, Arnos Vale, Saint Vincent and the Grenadines	Saint Vincent and the Grenadines	1–0	2–0	2022–23 CONCACAF Nations League B
