= Oakland Roots SC =

American professional soccer club based in Oakland

Oakland Roots
- Full name: Oakland Roots Sports Club
- Founded: July 2018; 8 years ago
- Stadium: Oakland Coliseum
- Capacity: 15,000
- Owner: List: Marshawn Lynch Billie Joe Armstrong G-Eazy Jason Kidd Sway Calloway Ruthie Bolton Alexis Gray-Lawson Antonio Davis Tyson Ross Calen Carr Josh Johnson Gary Payton II Keak da Sneak Community ownership
- President: Lindsay Barenz
- Head coach: Ryan Martin
- League: USL Championship
- 2026: 10th, Western Conference; Playoffs: DNQ
- Website: oaklandrootssc.com
Home colors	Away colors

Oakland Roots Sports Club is an American professional soccer club based in Oakland, California, that competes in the USL Championship (Western Conference). Founded in July 2018 by Edreece Arghandiwal and Benno Nagel, the club began play in the National Independent Soccer Association (NISA) before moving to the USL Championship in 2021.

"Oakland First, Always" is the motto the Roots were founded on, part of a vision to become the United States' first purpose-driven professional sports team.

The club won the Fall 2020 Western Conference title and finished as runners-up in the 2020 NISA Fall Championship, losing to Detroit City FC in the final. In the USL Championship, the Roots reached the conference semifinals in 2021 and 2022.

The Roots played their 2025 and 2026 home matches at the Oakland Coliseum in a 15,000-seat configuration. The first match at the Coliseum, a home opener against San Antonio FC, drew a sellout crowd of 26,575. In July 2026, the club announced it would leave the Coliseum after the 2026 season; the Roots' final match and farewell celebration at the Coliseum took place on October 10, 2026.

Community owned, the Roots' ownership includes Oakland natives Marshawn Lynch, Billie Joe Armstrong and Josh Johnson. The organization also fields a women's team, Oakland Soul, and Project 51O, a reserve team. The club is led by president Lindsay Barenz and head coach Ryan Martin, who was appointed on November 18, 2025.

== History ==
Historic League Performance of Oakland Roots SC

=== Founding and early vision ===
The Oakland Roots SC concept emerged from conversations between Edreece Arghandiwal and Benno Nagel at a Bay Area Afghan-American community soccer tournament. The pair founded the club in July 2018 with the "Oakland First, Always" guiding principle and the stated vision of becoming the United States' first purpose-driven professional sports team, inspired by FC St. Pauli.

In October 2018 the club's name and crest, designed by Matthew Wolff, were unveiled in partnership with Oaklandish.

The first player signings occurred in spring 2019, adding Devante Dubose, Julio Cervantes, Yohannes Harish, Benji Joya, and veteran forward Jack McInerney. Paul Bravo was appointed as the club's first technical director and head coach on May 9, 2019,.

=== National Independent Soccer Association ===
The inaugural match was played in front of a crowd of 4,500 on August 31, 2019, at Laney College. A 3–3 draw against California United Strikers, highlighted by a hat-trick from McInerney. During their first season in the National Independent Soccer Association (NISA), the club secured its first NISA league win by defeating Michigan Stars FC 2–1, and averaged 4,927 spectators across home matches. Following Bravo's departure on October 31, 2019, Jordan Ferrell was announced as head coach on December 3, 2019. In the Roots' spring 2020 season, operations were suspended and ultimately cancelled due to the COVID-19 pandemic on April 27, 2020. At the compressed Fall 2020 tournament the Roots finished first in the Western Conference and reached the NISA Fall Championship final, losing 2–1 to Detroit City FC.

=== USL Championship ===
On September 15, 2020 the Roots announced that they would be joining the USL Championship for the 2021 season. Ahead of their USL debut head coach Jordan Ferrell transitioned to technical director prior and Dario Pot took over as head coach.

The Roots secured only one win through their opening 13 matches in their USL debut, with home matches relocating to Las Positas College and Merritt College due to stadium issues at Laney College. Rallying late in the season, the team collected 34 points from their final 19 matches and clinched a playoff berth. In the postseason, the Roots upset Mountain Division champions El Paso Locomotive FC in the conference quarterfinals before falling 6–5 on penalties to Orange County SC after extra time in the Western Conference semifinals.

In 2022, forward Óttar Magnús Karlsson led the offense with 19 goals, while the squad recovered 16 points from losing positions. Following the departure of head coach Juan Guerra mid-season, Noah Delgado took over as interim coach, guiding another late-season rally. The Roots secured a 3–0 upset over San Diego Loyal SC in the opening round of the playoffs before falling 3–0 to eventual champions San Antonio FC in the semifinals.

The 2023 season brought a roster overhaul and the club moved its home venue to Pioneer Stadium in Hayward. Forward Johnny Rodriguez led the team with 12 goals but Oakland finished 10th in the Western Conference and missed the postseason.

Delgado was dismissed on April 28 after a poor start to the 2024 campaign. Assistant head coach Gavin Glinton took over as interim head coach before being appointed permanently in November 2024. The campaign included a 1–0 U.S. Open Cup win over MLS club San Jose Earthquakes, with the Roots finishing 7th in the conference before losing 2–0 to eventual champions Colorado Springs Switchbacks FC in the quarterfinals.

The Roots announced that their home games would be played at Oakland Coliseum for the 2025 season. On-field results saw Glinton dismissed on June 2, 2025, following a difficult start and cup exits. Former U.S. international Benny Feilhaber took over for the remainder of the campaign. Forward Peter Wilson enjoyed a strong debut season after transferring from FK Jerv, scoring 18 goals to win the USL Championship Golden Boot. Oakland finished the season with a 3–0 home win over Lexington SC on October 25, 2025. Ryan Martin was appointed head coach on November 18, 2025.

The 2026 campaign began with the club's training facility selected as a base camp for the Australia men's national soccer team for the 2026 FIFA World Cup. Following a difficult July that included league losses to New Mexico United, Lexington SC, and Sacramento Republic FC, the Roots mounted a late-season run, suffering only two defeats in their final eleven matches. A farewell celebration for the Coliseum was staged on October 10, 2026, before 9,718 spectators, having announced in July that they would leave the venue after the season. In the October 24 regular-season finale against Sacramento Republic FC, Peter Wilson scored in first-half stoppage time, his 15th league goal of the campaign, in a 3–2 defeat that eliminated Oakland from playoff contention. The Roots finished the season 10th in the Western Conference with a 9–11–10 record, totaling 38 points.

== Record ==
Overview of Oakland Roots SC seasons
Season	League	Div.	Pos.	P	W	D	L	GS	GA	Pts.	Playoffs	U.S. Open Cup	Top goalscorer		Manager
Season	League	Div.	Pos.	P	W	D	L	GS	GA	Pts.	Playoffs	U.S. Open Cup	Name	League	Manager
2019–20	NISA	Fall, West Coast (Note: The Fall 2019 NISA season had eight teams split into two separate conferences, East Coast and West Coast)	4th	6	0	3	3	10	13	3	Did not qualify	Cancelled	(United States) Jack McInerney	8	(United States) Paul Bravo
2019–20	NISA	Spring (Note: Spring season cancelled before completion)	1st	2	1	1	0	3	2	4	Cancelled	Cancelled	(United States) Jack McInerney	8	(United States) Jordan Ferrell
2020–21	NISA	Fall, Western (Note: The Fall 2020 NISA season had eight teams split into two separate conferences, Eastern and Western)	1st	2	1	1	0	3	1	4	Runner-up	Cancelled	(United States) Matthew Fondy	2	(United States) Jordan Ferrell
2021	USL Championship	Pacific Division	4th	32	11	8	13	36	41	41	Conf. Semi-Finals	Cancelled	(Democratic Republic of the Congo) Jeremy Bokila	5	(United States) Jordan Ferrell
2022	USL Championship	Western Conference	7th	34	11	13	10	51	46	46	Conf. Semi-Finals	R2	(Iceland) Óttar Magnús Karlsson	19	(Venezuela) Juan Guerra (6–12–7) (Puerto Rico) Noah Delgado (5–1–3)
2023	USL Championship	Western Conference	10th	34	11	9	14	45	48	42	Did not qualify	R3	(United States) Johnny Rodriguez	12	(Puerto Rico) Noah Delgado
2024	USL Championship	Western Conference	7th	34	13	5	16	37	57	44	Conf. Quarter-Finals	Ro32	(United States) Johnny Rodriguez	12	(Puerto Rico) Noah Delgado (2–1–5) (Turks and Caicos Islands) Gavin Glinton (11–4–11)
2025	USL Championship	Western Conference	10th	30	8	8	14	42	52	32	Did not qualify	R3	(Liberia) Peter Wilson	18	(Turks and Caicos Islands) Gavin Glinton (3–1–7) (United States) Benny Feilhaber (5–7–7)
2026	USL Championship	Western Conference	10th	30	9	11	10	39	40	38	Did not qualify	Did not qualify	(Liberia) Peter Wilson	15	(United States) Ryan Martin
Total	-			204	65	59	80	266	300	254	-				

== Stadium ==
Oakland Coliseum during halftime of a match between the Roots and Orange County SC in August 2026.

After spending its inaugural years playing at Laney College from 2019 to 2022 and Pioneer Stadium in Hayward during the 2023 season, the Roots moved into a 15,000-seat configuration at the Oakland Coliseum, playing there through the 2025 and 2026 seasons. The club drew a sellout crowd of 26,575 for its Coliseum home opener against San Antonio FC on March 22, 2025, and average attendance across the 2025 campaign rose to approximately 8,000. Citing operating costs, matchday flexibility, event control, and the paramount importance of controlling its own venue, the club announced in July 2026 that it would leave the Coliseum at the conclusion of the season. Their final match at the venue took place on October 10, 2026, before 9,718 spectators as part of a farewell celebration.

To secure a home venue ahead of the 2027 season, the club pursued a temporary modular stadium at the Harbor Bay Performance Center (located at 1150 and 1220 Harbor Bay Parkway), the former training facility of the Oakland Raiders in Alameda. On November 4, 2026, the Alameda City Council voted 5–0 to find the proposed approximately 8,000-seat facility consistent with the Airport Land Use Compatibility Plan. This was followed on November 9, 2026, by a unanimous 6–0 vote from the Alameda Planning Board approving the conditional use permit. The approval permits up to 27 professional soccer matches per year over three to five seasons through 2031, subject to a 10-day appeal window and a mandatory city review after the first year.

For its long-term stadium aspirations, the club advanced discussions regarding the Howard Terminal site on Oakland's waterfront. On September 10, 2026, Port of Oakland commissioners voted 6–0 to approve a one-year exploratory exclusive negotiating agreement (ENA) with the Roots and Industrial Realty Group. While not a formal lease or final approval, the ENA established a framework to evaluate project viability.

=== Average attendance ===
Attendance at Oakland Roots SC games by season
Year	Reg. Season
2019 Fall	4,927
2020 Spring	5,193
2020 Fall	N/A
2021	4,344*
2022	4,664
2023	3,894
2024	4,018
2025	8,375
2026	5,904

- For games at Laney and Merritt only

== Club colors and crest ==
Designed by Matthew Wolff—noted for designing Nigeria's kit for the 2018 FIFA World Cup—the Oakland Roots crest was unveiled in October 2018. The badge is centered on an oak tree, a municipal symbol of Oakland inspired by the tree outside Oakland City Hall. A white negative space outline within the tree traces the geographic map of the city, representing light shining through the tree, while the roots run into a multicolored mosaic symbolizing Oakland's cultural diversity. The crest quickly became recognized as one of the most identifiable in American soccer, gaining notable national exposure during the 2019 NBA playoffs when Damian Lillard wore a Roots shirt featuring the badge.

The club's traditional colors are black and white, with silver utilized as accent trim. While the crest itself incorporates a vibrant multicolored mosaic, the team's matchday identity is anchored by black primary kits and white secondary kits. This dynamic was highlighted in the 2026 Charly kit release, where the white secondary jersey featured a bold enlargement of the crest's mosaic across the front—symbolizing diversity and unity—while the black primary kit drew on the legend of the Oak-ness Monster beneath Lake Merritt.

== Club culture ==
The club was founded in 2018 with the stated vision of becoming the United States' first purpose-driven professional sports team, taking inspiration from clubs such as Germany's FC St. Pauli, and adopted "Oakland First, Always" as its guiding principle.

Matchdays have drawn on Oakland's arts and music culture since the club's first seasons. At Laney College, home matches featured a block party on East 10th Street and a pregame concert, and the stadium's sections carried local names such as the Mosaic and the Sideshow, the latter a nod to the city's car culture. Oakland rapper Mistah F.A.B performed before the club's final home game of 2019.

Local artists have remained part of the presentation at the Coliseum: co-owner E-40 performed at halftime of the club's 2026 home opener, a 2–1 win over New Mexico United played before about 14,500 spectators, the second-largest crowd in club history, and the club's final match at the Coliseum, on October 10, 2026, was staged as a farewell celebration, closing with a performance by newly announced co-owner Goapele, a halftime fashion show spotlighting Oakland designers and post-match fireworks before 9,718 spectators. In September 2025, the club released a third kit designed in collaboration with Oakland Latin hip hop duo Los Rakas in celebration of Latin and Hispanic heritage, debuted at its Conoce Tus Raíces Night.

The club partners with local non-profit organizations as part of a community outreach effort. In June 2020, the Roots became the first professional soccer club in the United States to join the Common Goal movement, pledging one percent of player and staff salaries and one percent of all ticket revenue to support non-profit organizations that use soccer to address social issues. Later that year the club staged the Justice Match, an exhibition in which Roots players lined up in mixed teams alongside women's professional players to advance discussion of racial and gender equity, and collaborated with FC St. Pauli on a "Justice First, Always" shirt, with 5.10 percent of proceeds donated to the Oakland Roots Justice Fund.

The Roots were founded as Oakland's established franchises were leaving the city — the Golden State Warriors moved to San Francisco in 2019, the Raiders to Las Vegas in 2020, and the Athletics departed after the 2024 season — and the club has frequently been framed as a rallying point for Oakland in their absence. Its move to the Coliseum in 2025 opened with a club-record crowd of 26,575, although regular attendances later settled well below that figure.

The club operates on a community ownership model. Former NFL player Marshawn Lynch joined the ownership group in April 2021. In September 2023, the club launched a community investment round, which the club called the most successful equity crowdfunding campaign in American sports; by its close on October 31, 2023, more than 4,000 new owners had invested over $2.4 million into the club.

=== Roots Justice Fund ===
The club created the Oakland Roots Justice Fund in 2020 as a charitable fund to support causes at the intersection of racial and gender justice. Administered with guidance from the East Bay Community Foundation, the fund began making grants late in 2020, including a $10,000 grant to the Radical Monarchs, an Oakland organization that works with young girls and gender-expansive youth of color. The club's 2021 end-of-season celebration raised further money for the fund through a raffle and silent auction, supporting causes including Common Goal's Anti-Racist Project.

Oakland Roots Supporters Section in late August 2026

=== Supporters ===
The club's supporters groups are La Brigada Del Pueblo, Oakland 68s, Homegrown Hooligans, Forever Oakland, Los Roots, and Komandos Verdé. Three of the groups — Homegrown Hooligans, Forever Oakland, and Los Roots — also form an umbrella group, La Union 1852.

The Oakland 68s were founded in 2017 by fans from the Oakland Athletics' right-field bleachers, their name marking the Athletics' first season in Oakland in 1968. Known for their drumming, they brought their support to the Roots as well, and now also back the city's other teams, including Soul and the Oakland Ballers. Forever Oakland likewise started among Oakland Raiders fans working to keep the city's teams in Oakland; its leader, Griz Jones, publicly rebuffed Raiders owner Mark Davis at the 2017 meeting in Phoenix where the club's relocation to Las Vegas was approved.

The groups' work extends beyond matchdays: the league has highlighted their collaboration with local organizations serving underserved communities in Oakland. In 2021, the Oakland 68s, La Brigada Del Pueblo, and Homegrown Hooligans jointly established the Oak Branch Award, honoring the player who best represented the club on and off the field; midfielder Emilio Díaz was voted its winner that year.

Additionally, the club participates in the NorCal Hella Cup, an unofficial annual in-season tournament created by regional supporters groups—Sacramento's Tower Bridge Battalion, Oakland's Los Roots, and Monterey Bay's Rising Tide—with regular-season matches between the three clubs deciding the winner. Sacramento Republic FC claimed the Hella Cup for the second consecutive year following a 3–2 victory over Oakland in the October 24, 2026, regular-season finale.

== Associated teams ==
=== Project 51O ===
The Oakland Roots reserve team, Project 51O, was launched on December 9, 2019. Originally set to compete in the National Premier Soccer League for the 2020 season, the team only played one match, a win over Napa Valley 1839 FC, before the season was halted and eventually cancelled due to COVID-19.

On September 17, 2020, the team announced it would compete in USL League Two beginning with the 2021 season. They eventually would forgo the season and start play in 2022.

=== Oakland Soul SC ===
On May 24, 2022, Oakland Roots SC launched their women's team, Oakland Soul, to play in the USL W League beginning in the 2023 season. Soul remain in the USL W League, playing their home matches at Merritt College. The club intends to elevate Soul to the first-division USL Super League once it secures a permanent stadium that it controls year-round. The interim stadium the club had planned for the Coliseum's Malibu Lot was abandoned in January 2025, as the club committed to the Coliseum as a short-term home; it has since been selected by the Port of Oakland to negotiate an agreement for a permanent venue at Howard Terminal, which the club says would allow Soul's elevation to the Super League.

== Sponsorship ==
Kit manufacturer and shirt sponsor by season
Season	Kit manufacturer	Shirt sponsor
2019–2020	Nike	Oaklandish
2021–2022	Puma	Anthem Blue Cross
2023	Meyba	Anthem Blue Cross
2024–	Charly	Anthem Blue Cross

== Players and staff ==
=== Current roster ===
As of November 12, 2026

Note: Flags indicate national team as defined under FIFA eligibility rules; some limited exceptions apply. Players may hold more than one non-FIFA nationality.

No.	Pos.	Nation	Player
1	GK	USA	Kendall McIntosh
2	MF	BRA	Bruno Lapa
4	MF	USA	Tommy McCabe
5	DF	ESP	David Garcia
6	MF	UGA	Bobosi Byaruhanga
7	FW	USA	Wolfgang Prentice
9	FW	LBR	Peter Wilson
10	MF	FRA	Florian Valot
11	DF	ESP	Jesus De Vincente
12	MF	USA	Tyler Gibson
15	DF	TTO	Neveal Hackshaw
17	DF	USA	Keegan Tingey
19	FW	USA	Jackson Kiil
20	DF	CAN	Mark Fisher
21	MF	USA	Tucker Lepley
23	DF	USA	Julian Bravo
27	FW	FRA	Bertin Jacquesson

No.	Pos.	Nation	Player
32	GK	USA	Julian Escobar
33	GK	SUI	Raphael Spiegel
34	DF	USA	Michael Edwards
38	MF	USA	Etienne Lopez
42	MF	USA	Emilio Martinez
44	FW	USA	Bradley Roberson
51	MF	USA	Charlie Wachs
53	DF	USA	Gavin Stone
55	DF	ESA	Jonathan Polio
57	GK	USA	Alejandro Caracheo Luna
59	MF	SRB	Luka Rosić
67	DF	USA	Emiliano Arana
70	GK	USA	Isaac Rosenthal
77	MF	ENG	Faysal Bettache
87	GK	USA	Devon Taylor
99	FW	MEX	Danny Trejo

==== Out on loan ====
Note: Flags indicate national team as defined under FIFA eligibility rules; some limited exceptions apply. Players may hold more than one non-FIFA nationality.

No.	Pos.	Nation	Player
8	MF	USA	Ali Elmasnaouy

=== Retired numbers ===
- 24 – Rickey Henderson – Oakland Sports Legend

=== Staff ===
As of January 13, 2026

Senior management and coaching staff
Senior management
President	(United States) Lindsay Barenz
Vice president of soccer	Eric Yamamoto
General manager	Dustin Cleaver
Director of soccer	(Canada) Nana Attakora
Coaching staff
Head coach	(United States) Ryan Martin
First assistant coach	(United States) Jeremy Clark
Second assistant coach	David Cordova Marroquin
Goalkeeping coach	Sergio Valle

=== Coaching records ===
As of October 28, 2026

Oakland Roots SC coaching records
Name	Nat.	From	To	P	W	D	L	GS	GA	%W	Honors	Notes
Paul Bravo	United States	May 9, 2019	October 31, 2019	6	0	3	3	10	13	0.00		
Jordan Ferrell	United States	December 3, 2019	November 16, 2020	9	5	2	2	15	9	55.56	2020 Fall NISA Western Conference Champion	
Dario Pot	Croatia	November 16, 2020	April 25, 2021	0	0	0	0	0	0	—		
Jordan Ferrell	United States	April 25, 2021	December 30, 2021	34	12	9	13	37	41	35.29		
Juan Guerra	Venezuela	December 30, 2021	August 18, 2022	26	6	12	8	38	38	23.08		
Noah Delgado (interim)	United States	August 18, 2022	November 30, 2022	11	6	1	4	16	13	54.55		
Noah Delgado	United States	December 1, 2022	April 28, 2024	45	15	10	20	57	65	33.33		
Gavin Glinton (interim)	Turks and Caicos Islands	April 28, 2024	November 12, 2024	28	11	4	13	30	46	39.29		
Gavin Glinton	Turks and Caicos Islands	November 12, 2024	June 2, 2025	12	3	1	8	14	24	25.00		
Benny Feilhaber	United States	June 2, 2025	October 25, 2025	19	5	7	7	29	30	26.32		
Ryan Martin	United States	November 18, 2025	present	30	9	11	10	39	40	30.00		

== Honors ==
=== League ===
National Independent Soccer Association

- Western Conference
  - Champion (1): 2020
