= 2024 Monterey Bay FC season =

Monterey Bay FC
2024 season
- Owners: Ray Beshoff
- Manager: Frank Yallop
- Stadium: Cardinale Stadium
- USL Championship: Western Conference: 11th
- USLC playoffs: DNQ
- U.S. Open Cup: Round of 32
- Top goalscorer: Tristan Trager (8 goals)
- Highest home attendance: 5,199 (August 24, against El Paso Locomotive FC)
- Lowest home attendance: 3,309 (June 8, against Sacramento Republic FC)
Home colours	Away colours

The 2024 Monterey Bay FC season was the club's third season since their establishment on February 1, 2021.

== Background ==
The club won their first ever U.S. Open Cup match on April 5, 2023, away to Central Valley Fuego FC. In the following round Monterey Bay achieved their most important win in club history, upsetting local MLS club San Jose Earthquakes 1–0. It was their first competitive match against a first division club in their history. The club would once again host MLS competition in the US Open Cup, but this time they fell in a penalty-shootout against Los Angeles FC. The match against LAFC featured the club's highest ever attendance, just shy of a sellout with 5,808 fans on hand. Despite a hot start to the season, Monterey Bay would ultimately finish the season in 11th place, once again 2nd to last in the Western Conference and six points away from qualifying for the playoffs.

== Season squad ==
Squad No.	Name	Nationality	Position(s)	Date of birth (age)
Goalkeepers
16	Antony Siaha	(United States)	GK	April 27, 1998 (age 28)
21	Carlos Herrera	(United States)	GK	September 12, 1997 (age 29)
23	Fabian Narez	(United States)	GK	October 19, 1994 (age 31)
Defenders
3	Morey Doner	(Canada)	RB	March 25, 1994 (age 32)
4	Alex Lara	(United States)	CB	September 15, 1998 (age 28)
5	Carlos Guzmán	(Mexico)	DF	May 19, 1994 (age 32)
11	Walmer Martinez	(El Salvador)	DF	August 17, 1998 (age 28)
12	Grant Robinson	(United States)	LB	August 15, 1998 (age 28)
24	Max Glasser	(United States)	DF	August 16, 2000 (age 26)
33	Kai Greene	(United States)	CB	July 13, 1993 (age 33)
Midfielders
7	Adrian Rebollar	(United States)	MF	November 12, 1999 (age 26)
8	Simon Dawkins	(Jamaica)	MF	December 1, 1987 (age 38)
13	Mobi Fehr	(United States)	MF	December 13, 1994 (age 31)
14	Miguel Guerrero	(United States)	MF	August 23, 2001 (age 25)
20	Rafael Baca	(Mexico)	MF	September 11, 1989 (age 37)
32	Pierce Gallaway	(United States)	MF	April 25, 2001 (age 25)
64	Jerry Ayon	(United States)	MF	September 16, 2001 (age 25)
99	Xavi Gnaulati	(United States)	MF	January 22, 2005 (age 21)
Forwards
6	Ryan Dieter	(United States)	FW	July 14, 2001 (age 25)
9	Tristan Trager	(United States)	FW	August 29, 1999 (age 27)
15	Alex Dixon	(United States)	FW	February 7, 1990 (age 36)
18	Michael Gonzalez	(United States)	FW	January 3, 2001 (age 25)
19	Jesús Enríquez	(United States)	FW	August 16, 1997 (age 29)
20	Anthony Orendain	(United States)	FW	March 10, 1998 (age 28)
17	Luther Archimède	(Guadeloupe)	FW	September 17, 1999 (age 27)
22	Jesse Maldonado	(United States)	FW	September 1, 2002 (age 24)
31	Chase Boone	(United States)	FW	September 21, 1995 (age 31)

Last updated: 15 April 2024.
Source: Monterey Bay F.C., USL Championship

== Transfers ==
=== In ===
Pos.	Player	Signed from	Details	Date	Ref.
DF	(Mexico) Carlos Guzmán	(United States) San Diego Loyal SC	Free transfer	December 4, 2023	
MF	(United States) Xavi Gnaulati	(United States) San Diego Loyal SC	Free transfer	December 6, 2023	
FW	(Guadeloupe) Luther Archimède	(United States) Sacramento Republic FC	Free transfer	December 12, 2023	
FW	(United States) Tristan Trager	(United States) Charleston Battery	Undisclosed fee	January 31, 2024	
MF	(United States) Pierce Gallaway	(United States) Old Dominion Monarchs	Free transfer	February 22, 2024	
FW	(United States) Ryan Dieter	(United States) UC Davis Aggies	Free transfer	March 13, 2024	
MF	(United States) Miguel Guerrero	(United States) Cal State Monterey Bay Otters	Free transfer	March 13, 2024	
FW	(United States) Anthony Orendain	(United States) Monterey Bay FC 2	Free transfer	March 13, 2024	
FW	(United States) Michael Gonzalez	(United States) Sacramento State Hornets	Free transfer	March 23, 2024	
GK	(United States) Fabian Narez	(United States) Monterey Bay FC 2	25 Day Contract	April 12, 2024	
MF	(United States) Jerry Ayon	(United States) San Jose Earthquakes II	Free transfer	April 15, 2024	

=== Out ===
Date	Pos.	Player	To	Details	Ref.
November 28, 2023	MF	(United States) James Murphy	(United States) Detroit City FC	Option declined	
November 28, 2023	FW	(United States) Sean Okoli	Free Agency	Out of contract	
November 28, 2023	DF	(United States) Hugh Roberts	(United States) Charlotte Independence	Option declined	
November 28, 2023	FW	(United States) Christian Volesky	(Canada) HFX Wanderers FC	Contract release	
November 28, 2023	MF	(South Sudan) Nevello Yoseke	Free Agency	Out of contract	
January 8, 2024	FW	(England) Sam Gleadle	(United States) Louisville City FC	Undisclosed fee	

== Competitions ==
=== Preseason ===
February 10, 2024 Preseason	Monterey Bay FC	2–1	Central Valley Fuego FC	Seaside, California
7:00 PM PST	Greene 15'; Guerrero 60'	Report		Stadium: Cardinale Stadium

February 24, 2024 Preseason	Monterey Bay FC	1–1	San Jose Earthquakes II	Seaside, California
6:00 PM PST	Orendain 87'	Report	63'	Stadium: Cardinale Stadium

March 2, 2023 Preseason	Sacramento Republic FC	2–1	Monterey Bay FC	Sacramento, California
2:00pm PST	López 17'; Ukaegbu 73'	Report	Fehr 65'	Stadium: Heart Health Park

=== USL Championship ===
==== Western Conference ====
Pos	Team	Pld	W	L	T	GF	GA	GD	Pts	Qualification
8	Phoenix Rising FC	34	11	14	9	33	39	−6	42	Playoffs
9	San Antonio FC	34	10	15	9	36	49	−13	39	
10	FC Tulsa	34	9	14	11	33	48	−15	38	
11	Monterey Bay FC	34	8	16	10	29	44	−15	34	
12	El Paso Locomotive FC	34	8	18	8	27	46	−19	32	

Source: USL Championship Standings
Rules for classification: 1) head-to-head points; 2) head-to-head goal differential; 3) points-per game within conference; 4) total wins; 5) total goal differential; 6) total goals scored; 7) points earned against top four Conference finishers; 8) disciplinary points; 9) coin toss or drawing of lots

Overall								Home						Away					
Pld	W	D	L	GF	GA	GD	Pts	W	D	L	GF	GA	GD	W	D	L	GF	GA	GD
34	8	10	16	29	44	−15	34	4	7	6	14	17	−3	4	3	10	15	27	−12

Source: Match reports

==== Results by round ====
Round	1	2	3	4	5	6	7	8	9	10	11	12	13	14	15	16	17	18	19	20	21	22	23	24	25	26	27	28	29	30	31	32	33	34
Stadium	A	H	H	A	A	H	A	A	H	H	A	A	H	H	H	A	H	A	A	H	A	H	H	A	H	A	H	A	H	H	A	A	H	A
Result	D	W	D	L	W	W	W																											
Position	6	4	4	6	6	3	2																											

Updated to match(es) played on April 20, 2024. Source: Match reports
A = Away; H = Home; W = Win; D = Draw; L = Loss

==== Matches ====
March 13, 2024 1	El Paso Locomotive FC	1–1	Monterey Bay FC	El Paso, Texas
6:00 PM PDT	Moreno 4'	Report	Dixon 87'	Stadium: Southwest University Park; Attendance: 4,566; Referee: Brad Jensen

March 16, 2024 2	Monterey Bay FC	1–0	Phoenix Rising FC	Seaside, California
7:00 PM PDT	Baca 22'	Report		Stadium: Cardinale Stadium; Attendance: 4,867; Referee: Calin Radosav

March 24, 2024 3	Monterey Bay FC	2–2	Rhode Island FC	Seaside, California
3:00 PM PDT	Guzmán 45'; Trager 72'	Report	Dikwa 41', 63'	Stadium: Cardinale Stadium; Attendance: 3,359; Referee: Alexis Da Silva

March 30, 2024 4	San Antonio FC	2–1	Monterey Bay FC	San Antonio, Texas
5:30 PM PDT	Manley 7'; Lambert 86'	Report	Fehr 45+3'	Stadium: Toyota Field; Attendance: 7,546; Referee: Lorenzo Hernandez

April 6, 2024 5	Oakland Roots	0–1	Monterey Bay FC	Hayward, California
7:00 PM PDT		Report	Boone 86'	Stadium: Pioneer Stadium; Attendance: 3,001; Referee: Gerald Flores

April 13, 2024 6	Monterey Bay FC	3–1	Las Vegas Lights FC	Seaside, California
7:00 PM PDT	Dixon 10' (pen.); Trager 45'; Gonzalez 74'	Report	Samaké 45+1'	Stadium: Cardinale Stadium; Attendance: 3,524; Referee: Elijio Arreguin

April 20, 2024 7	Memphis 901 FC	1–2	Monterey Bay FC	Memphis, Tennessee
5:00 PM PDT	Lara 1' (o.g.); Jimenez (yellow card) 36'; Duncan (yellow card) 49'; Quezada (yellow card) 72'	Report	Trager 68' (pen.); Lara 70'	Stadium: AutoZone Park; Attendance: 2,598; Referee: Muhammad Hassan

April 27, 2024 8	Orange County SC	2–0	Monterey Bay FC	Irvine, California
7:00 PM PDT	Amang 6'; Scott (yellow card) 21'; Sorto (yellow card) 24'; Djeffal (yellow card) 52'; Shutler (yellow card) 65'; Zubak 82'	Report	Lara (yellow card) 25'; Rebollar (yellow card) 54'	Stadium: Championship Soccer Stadium; Attendance: 4,588; Referee: Deshun Beard

May 4, 2024 9	Monterey Bay FC	0–1	Indy Eleven	Seaside, California
7:00 PM PDT	Archimede (yellow card) 75'; Fehr (yellow card) 87'	Report	Stanley (yellow card) 71'; Diz Pe (yellow card) 74'; Collier 88'; Blake (yellow card) 90+2'	Stadium: Cardinale Stadium; Attendance: 4,504; Referee: Corbyn May

May 11, 2024 10	Monterey Bay FC	2–2	Memphis 901 FC	Seaside, California
7:00 PM PDT	Fehr 35'; Trager 90'	Report	Lapa 70'; Cissoko (yellow card) 82' Lopes 88' (yellow card) 89'	Stadium: Cardinale Stadium; Attendance: 3,580; Referee: Kyle Johnston

May 18, 2024 11	Loudoun United FC	3–0	Monterey Bay FC	Leesburg, Virginia
4:00 PM PDT	Dambrot (yellow card) 3'; Bidois 9'; Zwetsloot (yellow card) 49'; ElMedkhar 56'; McCabe (yellow card) 64'; Guzmán 79' (o.g.); Wane (yellow card) 83'; Turner (yellow card) 88'	Report	Orendian (yellow card) 16' (yellow-red card) 38'; Doner (yellow card) 28'; Lara (yellow card) 45+5'	Stadium: Segra Field; Attendance: 1,525; Referee: Thomas Snyder

May 24, 2024 12	Hartford Athletic	2–1	Monterey Bay FC	Hartford, Connecticut
4:30 PM PDT	Ngalina 33'; Beckford 50'; Farrell (yellow card) 55'; Williams (yellow card) 90'; Hodge (yellow card) 90+4'	Report	Rebollar (18"); Guzmán (yellow card) 54'; Lara (yellow card) 61'; Fehr (yellow card) 68'; Robinson (yellow card) 89'	Stadium: Trinity Health Stadium; Attendance: 4,983; Referee: Ricardo Montero

May 29, 2024 13	Monterey Bay FC	0–0	Charleston Battery	Seaside, California
7:00 PM PDT	Robinson (yellow card) 78'; Rebollar (yellow card) 90+1'	Report	Dossantos (yellow card) 25'	Stadium: Cardinale Stadium; Attendance: 3,423; Referee: Elvis Osmanovic

June 2, 2024 14	Monterey Bay FC	1–0	New Mexico United	Seaside, California
4:00 PM PDT	Greene (yellow card) 7'; Enríquez 64'; Baca (yellow card) 68'; Ngnepi (yellow card) 84'	Report	Hurst (yellow card) 39'; Flanagan (yellow card) 43'; Herbert (yellow card) 61'	Stadium: Cardinale Stadium; Attendance: 3,419; Referee: Servando Berna Rico

June 8, 2024 15	Monterey Bay FC	0–2	Sacramento Republic FC	Seaside, California
7:00 PM PDT	Martínez (yellow card) 82'	Report	Herrera (yellow card) 45+1'; Phillips 54'; Parano 62'; Gurr (red card) 90+2'	Stadium: Cardinale Stadium; Attendance: 3,309; Referee: Matthew Thompson

June 16, 2024 16	North Carolina FC	2–0	Monterey Bay FC	Cary, North Carolina
3:00 PM PDT	Anderson 28'; Mentzingen 34' (pen.); Perez (yellow card) 85'	Report	Martinez (yellow card) 26'; Guzmán (red card) 32'; Rebollar (yellow card) 45+3'	Stadium: WakeMed Soccer Park; Attendance: 2,047; Referee: Esad Omanovic

June 22, 2024 17	Monterey Bay FC	2–1	Oakland Roots	Seaside, California
7:00 PM PDT	Trager 30'; Dixon (yellow card) 34' (goal) 48'; Baca (yellow card) 90+2' (yellow-red card) 90+5'	Report	Diaz (yellow card) 12'; Donasiyano (yellow card) 41' (yellow-red card) 84'; Hackshaw (yellow card) 52'; Rodriguez 64'	Stadium: Cardinale Stadium; Attendance: 4,330; Referee: Ricardo Montero

June 29, 2024 18	Colorado Springs Switchbacks	1–0	Monterey Bay FC	Colorado Springs, Colorado
6:00 PM PDT	Damus 39' (pen.); Real (yellow card) 52'	Report	Ngnepi (yellow card) 37'; Lara (yellow card) 42'; Rebollar (yellow card) 55'; Greene (yellow card) 58'	Stadium: Weidner Field; Attendance: 8,023; Referee: Lorenzo Hernandez

July 6, 2024 19	Pittsburgh Riverhounds SC	0–1	Monterey Bay FC	Pittsburgh, Pennsylvania
4:00 PM PDT		Report	Rebollar (yellow card) 38'; Bouda 90+1'	Stadium: Highmark Stadium; Attendance: 5,018; Referee: Joe Surgan

July 13, 2024 20	Monterey Bay FC	0–0	FC Tulsa	Seaside, California
7:00 PM PDT	Dixon (yellow card) 23'; Baca (yellow card) 82'	Report	St Clair (yellow card) 29'; Souahy (yellow card) 58'; Goodrum (yellow card) 74'; Bourgeois (yellow card) 89'	Stadium: Cardinale Stadium; Attendance: 4,011; Referee: Benjamin Meyer

July 27, 2024 21	Louisville City FC	4–1	Monterey Bay FC	Louisville, Kentucky
6:00 PM PDT	Morris 3'; Harris 7'; Wynder 28'; Gleadle 81'	Report	Fehr 24'; Martinez (yellow card) 37'	Stadium: Lynn Family Stadium; Attendance: 9,701; Referee: Matthew Corrigan; Assistant referees: Seth Barton; Noah Kenyawani; Fourth official: Noah Matos

August 3, 2024 22	Monterey Bay FC	2–2	Tampa Bay Rowdies	Seaside, California
7:00 PM PDT	Gnaulati (yellow card) 26'; Dixon 29'; Guzmán (yellow card) 45+1'; Ngnepi (yellow card) 61'; Trager 90+2'	Report	Kleemann (yellow card) 9'; Guillen (yellow card) 54'; Jennings 71'; Arteaga 84' (pen.)	Stadium: Cardinale Stadium; Attendance: 4,024; Referee: Nabil Bensalah

August 10, 2024 23	Monterey Bay FC	1–2	Birmingham City FC	Seaside, California
7:00 PM PDT	Rebollar (yellow card) 16'; Fehr (yellow card) 54'; Trager 60'	Report	Hernandez-Foster 33' (yellow card) 45'; Pinho 48'; Crognale (red card) 71'	Stadium: Cardinale Stadium; Attendance: 4,009; Referee: Muhammad Hassan

August 17, 2024 24	New Mexico United	3–2	Monterey Bay FC	Albuquerque, New Mexico
6:00 PM PDT	Akale 13'; Reyes 28'; Seymore (yellow card) 52'; Ryden 78'	Report	Dixon 34'; Rebollar (yellow card) 45+4', (goal) 88'	Stadium: Isotopes Park; Attendance: 8,868; Referee: Ricardo Fierro

August 24, 2024 25	Monterey Bay FC	0–0	El Paso Locomotive	Seaside, California
7:00 PM PDT	Fehr (yellow card) 25'; Dixon (yellow card) 59'	Report	Craig (yellow card) 23'; Coronado (yellow card) 33'; Dollenmayer (yellow card) 41' (yellow-red card) 90+2'	Stadium: Cardinale Stadium; Attendance: 5,199; Referee: Benjamin Meyer

August 31, 2024 26	Miami FC	1–0	Monterey Bay FC	Miami, Florida
4:00 PM PDT	Lawrence (yellow card) 45+2'; López 48'; Knutson (yellow card) 88'	Report	Rebollar (yellow card) 4'; Ayon (yellow card) 22' (yellow-red card) 39'; Ngnepi (yellow card) 90+7'	Stadium: FIU Stadium; Attendance: 1,013; Referee: Esad Omanovic

September 7, 2024 27	Monterey Bay FC	0–1	San Antonio FC	Seaside, California
7:00 PM PDT	Martinez (yellow card) 16'; Greene (yellow card) 90+7'	Report	Solignac 57' (pen.); Manley (yellow card) 64'; Mbongue (yellow card) 90+10'	Stadium: Cardinale Stadium; Attendance: 3,827; Referee: Elijio Arreguin

September 14, 2024 28	Las Vegas Lights	0–0	Monterey Bay FC	Las Vegas, Nevada
7:30 PM PDT	Smart (yellow card) 15'	Report	Volesky (yellow card) 33'; Gnaulati (yellow card) 52'; Gonzalez (yellow card) 77'	Stadium: Cashman Field; Referee: Adam Kilpatrick

September 21, 2024 29	Monterey Bay FC	0–0	Orange County SC	Seaside, California
7:00 PM PDT		Report	Partida (yellow card) 67'	Stadium: Cardinale Stadium; Attendance: 3,912; Referee: Elton García

September 28, 2024 30	Monterey Bay FC	0–2	Detroit City FC	Seaside, California
7:00 PM PDT	Robinson (yellow card) 38'; Gutierrez (yellow card) 70'; Dieter (yellow card) 80'	Report	Diop (yellow card) 31'; Morris (yellow card) 37'; Rutz 86'	Stadium: Cardinale Stadium; Attendance: 4,742; Referee: Abdou Ndiaye

October 4, 2024 31	Phoenix Rising FC	1–2	Monterey Bay FC	Phoenix, Arizona
7:30 PM PDT	Zambrano (yellow card) 25'; Formella 84'	Report	Fehr 15'; Novo 44' (o.g.); Guzmán (yellow card) 61'	Stadium: Phoenix Rising Soccer Stadium; Attendance: 5,757; Referee: Brandon Stevis

October 9, 2024 32	Sacramento Republic FC	2–2	Monterey Bay FC	Sacramento, California
7:00 PM PDT	Parano 15'; Ross (yellow card) 68' (goal) 78'; Cicerone (yellow card) 89'; Neville (yellow card) 90+1'	Report	Gnaulati 21'; Doner 90+3'; Martinez (yellow card) 90+4'	Stadium: Heart Health Park; Attendance: 8,988; Referee: Trevor Wiseman

October 19, 2024 33	Monterey Bay FC	0–1	Colorado Springs Switchbacks	Seaside, California
8:00 PM	Lara (yellow card) 15'; Martinez (yellow card) 62'; Gnaulati (yellow card) 90+7'	Report	Zandi 50' (yellow card) 74'; Magee (yellow card) 69'; Real (yellow card) 90+8'	Stadium: Cardinale Stadium; Attendance: 4,150; Referee: Alex Beehler

October 26, 2024 34	FC Tulsa	2–1	Monterey Bay FC	Tulsa, Oklahoma
3:00 PM PDT	Souahy 10'; Booth 31'	Report	Gutierrez 59'; Volesky (yellow card) 82'	Stadium: ONEOK Field; Referee: Muhammad Hassan

=== U.S. Open Cup ===
Monterey Bay was among the USL Championship sides that entered into the third round of the 2024 U.S. Open Cup. Last season Monterey Bay entered the second round of the 2023 U.S. Open Cup, where they achieved their first US Open Cup victory, away to USL League One side Central Valley Fuego FC.

April 17 Third Round	Monterey Bay FC (USLC) (California)	2–1	(California) Irvine Zeta FC (NISA)	Seaside, California
7:30 PM	Lara (yellow card) 12'; Ayon 32', 65'; Archimede (yellow card) 51'	Report	Almeida 62'; Culwell (yellow card) 66'; Kleszewski (yellow card) 74'; Cervantes (yellow card) 76'	Stadium: Cardinale Stadium; Attendance: 2,564; Referee: Turan Ozdemir

May 7 Round of 32	Sacramento Republic FC (California)	2–0	(California) Monterey Bay FC	Sacramento, California
7:30 PM PDT	Greene 27' (o.g.); Phillips 31'; Lopez (yellow card) 36'	Report	Guerrero (yellow card) 22'; Robinson (yellow card) 60'	Stadium: Heart Health Park; Attendance: 2,900; Referee: Thomas Supple
