= 2023 Monterey Bay FC season =

Monterey Bay FC
2023 season
- Owners: Ray Beshoff
- Manager: Frank Yallop
- Stadium: Cardinale Stadium
- Highest home attendance: 5,720
- Lowest home attendance: 3,019
- Average home league attendance: 3,963
Home colours	Away colours

The 2023 Monterey Bay FC season was the club's second season since their establishment on February 1, 2021.

== Background ==
The Union finished their first ever season twelfth place in the Western Conference of the USL Championship, seven points away from the final playoff spot. The team also suffered an upset in their US Open Cup debut, losing against the 3rd division side Bay Cities FC.

In preparation for their second season, Monterey Bay brought back 17 players from their inaugural squad.

== Season squad ==
Squad No.	Name	Nationality	Position(s)	Date of birth (age)
Goalkeepers
16	Antony Siaha	(United States)	GK	April 27, 1998 (age 28)
21	Carlos Herrera	(United States)	GK	September 12, 1997 (age 28)
Defenders
2	Hugh Roberts (C)	(United States)	CB	September 27, 1992 (age 33)
3	Morey Doner	(Canada)	RB	March 25, 1994 (age 32)
4	Alex Lara	(United States)	CB	September 15, 1998 (age 27)
12	Grant Robinson	(United States)	LB	August 15, 1998 (age 27)
24	Max Glasser	(United States)	DF	August 16, 2000 (age 25)
33	Kai Greene	(United States)	CB	July 13, 1993 (age 33)
Midfielders
5	Nevello Yoseke	(Canada)	MF	March 17, 1996 (age 30)
6	James Murphy	(United States)	MF	September 17, 1997 (age 28)
7	Adrian Rebollar	(United States)	MF	November 12, 1999 (age 26)
8	Simon Dawkins	(Jamaica)	MF	December 1, 1987 (age 38)
13	Mobi Fehr	(United States)	MF	December 13, 1994 (age 31)
17	Arun Basuljevic	(United States)	MF	December 17, 1995 (age 30)
20	Rafael Baca	(Mexico)	MF	September 11, 1989 (age 36)
23	Sam Gleadle	(England)	MF	March 20, 1996 (age 30)
Forwards
9	Sean Okoli	(United States)	FW	February 3, 1993 (age 33)
10	Christian Volesky	(United States)	FW	September 15, 1992 (age 33)
11	Walmer Martinez	(El Salvador)	FW	August 17, 1998 (age 27)
14	Jason Johnson	(Jamaica)	FW	October 9, 1990 (age 35)
15	Alex Dixon	(United States)	FW	February 7, 1990 (age 36)
19	Jesús Enríquez	(United States)	FW	August 16, 1997 (age 28)
22	Jesse Maldonado	(United States)	FW	September 1, 2002 (age 23)
31	Chase Boone	(United States)	FW	September 21, 1995 (age 30)

Last updated: 16 December 2023.
Source: Monterey Bay F.C., USL Championship

== Transfers ==
=== In ===
Pos.	Player	Signed from	Details	Date	Ref.
FW	(United States) Alex Dixon	(United States) Pittsburgh Riverhounds SC	Free transfer	December 13, 2022	
DF	(United States) Alex Lara	(United States) Las Vegas Lights FC	Free transfer	December 27, 2022	
DF	(United States) Max Glasser	(United States) UC Davis Aggies	Free transfer	February 14, 2023	
FW	(United States) Jesús Enríquez	(United States) Oakland Roots SC	Free transfer	March 17, 2023	
MF	(Canada) Nevello Yoseke	Free Agency	Free transfer	April 7, 2023	
FW	(United States) Sean Okoli	(United States) Orange County SC	Free transfer	April 20, 2023	
MF	(Mexico) Rafael Baca	(Mexico) Cruz Azul	Free transfer	July 27, 2023	

=== Out ===
Date	Pos.	Player	To	Details	Ref.
November 22, 2022	FW	(Liberia) Seku Conneh	Free Agency	Option declined	
November 22, 2022	FW	(United States) Christopher Cortez	Free Agency	Option declined	
November 22, 2022	GK	(Dominican Republic) Rafael Díaz	Free Agency	Option declined	
November 22, 2022	DF	(United States) Hunter Gorskie	Free Agency	Out of contract	
November 22, 2022	DF	(United States) Sam Strong	(United States) Central Valley Fuego FC	Option declined	
November 22, 2022	MF	(Panama) Jiro Barriga Toyama	Free Agency	Option declined	
March 23, 2023	MF	(United States) Arun Basuljevic	(United States) El Paso Locomotive FC	Mutual agreement	
June 5, 2023	FW	(Jamaica) Jason Johnson	Free Agency	Released	

== Competitions ==
=== Friendlies ===
February 4, 2023 Preseason	Monterey Bay FC	1–2	San Jose Earthquakes	Seaside, California
7:00 PM PST	Martinez 44'	Report	Ebobisse 28'; Munie 85'	Stadium: Cardinale Stadium; Attendance: 4,648

February 18, 2023 Preseason	Monterey Bay FC	2–2	Sacramento Republic FC	Seaside, California
3:00 PM PST	Gleadle 44'; Dixon 45'	Report	Gurr 80', 89'	Stadium: Cardinale Stadium

February 25, 2023 Preseason	Monterey Bay FC	0–1	Oakland Roots SC	Seaside, California
5:00pm PST		Report	Rodriguez 30'	Stadium: Cardinale Stadium

March 4, 2023 Preseason	Sacramento Republic FC	4–2	Monterey Bay FC	Sacramento, California
1:00pm PST	Keko (yellow card) 5'; Cicerone 17', 20'; Herrera 47' (pen.); Wiedt (yellow card) 64'; Lewis 89'	Report	Boone 18', (yellow card) 55'; Martinez 44'	Stadium: Heart Health Park

=== USL Championship ===
==== Western Conference ====
Pos	Team	Pld	W	L	T	GF	GA	GD	Pts	Qualification
8	New Mexico United	34	13	14	7	51	49	+2	46	Playoffs
9	Rio Grande Valley FC Toros	34	10	11	13	43	48	−5	43	
10	Oakland Roots SC	34	11	14	9	45	48	−3	42	
11	Monterey Bay FC	34	11	15	8	42	53	−11	41	
12	Las Vegas Lights FC	34	3	21	10	36	66	−30	19	

Source: USL Championship Standings
Rules for classification: 1) head-to-head points; 2) head-to-head goal differential; 3) points-per game within conference; 4) total wins; 5) total goal differential; 6) total goals scored; 7) points earned against top four Conference finishers; 8) disciplinary points; 9) coin toss or drawing of lots

Overall								Home						Away					
Pld	W	D	L	GF	GA	GD	Pts	W	D	L	GF	GA	GD	W	D	L	GF	GA	GD
34	11	8	15	42	53	−11	41	6	4	6	25	23	+2	5	4	9	17	30	−13

Source: Match reports

==== Results by round ====
Round	1	2	3	4	5	6	7	8	9	10	11	12	13	14	15	16	17	18	19	20	21	22	23	24	25	26	27	28	29	30	31	32	33	34
Stadium	H	H	A	H	H	A	A	H	H	A	A	H	H	A	A	H	A	A	H	H	A	H	H	A	A	H	A	A	H	H	A	A	A	H
Result	W	L	D	L	W	D	W	D	D	L	L	D	W	W	W	W	L	L	D	L	L	L	L	L	D	W	W	W	W	L	D	L	L	L
Position	1	5	4	6	5	5	4	6	5	7	9	8	6	6	4	3	4	5	6	7	9	10	10	11	11	10	9	8	8	8	8	9	10	11

Updated to match(es) played on September 9, 2023. Source: Match reports
A = Away; H = Home; W = Win; D = Draw; L = Loss

==== Matches ====
March 11, 2023 1	Monterey Bay FC	5–3	Hartford Athletic	Seaside, California
7:00 PM PST	Dixon 2', 39', 44' (pen.); Rad 45' (o.g.); Rebollar 67'	Report	Saydee 23', 76'; Rad 41'; Amoh (yellow card) 50'; Logue (yellow card) 64'; Yacoubou (yellow card) 90+5'	Stadium: Cardinale Stadium; Attendance: 3,615; Referee: Elijio Arreguin

March 18, 2023 2	Monterey Bay FC	0–1	Louisville City FC	Seaside, California
7:00 PM PDT	Boone (yellow card) 22'; Dixon (yellow card) 34'; Murphy (yellow card) 65'	Report	Perez (yellow card) 33'; Ownby 48', (yellow card) 55' (yellow-red card) 67'; DelPiccolo (yellow card) 68'	Stadium: Cardinale Stadium; Attendance: 3,019; Referee: Elton Garcia

March 24, 2023 3	Rio Grande Valley FC	1–1	Monterey Bay FC	Edinburg, Texas
5:00 PM PDT	Nodarse (yellow card) 55'; Davila 90+1'; Pimentel (red card) 90+1'; Ruiz (yellow card) 90+2'; Ritondale (yellow card) 90+3'	Report	Roberts (yellow card) 8'; Fehr (yellow card) 34' (yellow-red card) 71'; Alex Dixon 62'; Siaha (yellow card) 90+2'	Stadium: H-E-B Park; Attendance: 5,014; Referee: Ricardo Fierro

April 1, 2023 4	Monterey Bay FC	1–2	San Antonio FC	Seaside, California
7:00 PM PDT	Rebollar (yellow card) 45'; Gleadle 63'; Volesky (yellow card) 68'	Report	Hansen 8'; Batista 54'; Bailey (yellow card) 85'	Stadium: Cardinale Stadium; Attendance: 3,885; Referee: Campo Hernandez

April 8, 2023 5	Monterey Bay FC	4–2	New Mexico United	Seaside, California
7:00 PM PDT	Robinson (yellow card) 18'; Dixon 33'; Gleadle 40'; Volesky 50', 71'; Murphy (yellow card) 86'	Report	Wehan 12'; Moreno 77'	Stadium: Cardinale Stadium; Attendance: 3,548; Referee: Brandon Stevis

April 15, 2023 6	Phoenix Rising FC	1–1	Monterey Bay FC	Phoenix, Arizona
6:30 PM PDT	Lambert 67'; Trejo (yellow card) 82'	Report	Yoseke (yellow card) 35'; Dixon 63' (pen.); Robinson (yellow card) 66'	Stadium: Phoenix Rising Soccer Stadium; Attendance: 6,115; Referee: Katja Koroleva

April 22, 2023 7	Indy Eleven	2–3	Monterey Bay FC	Indianapolis, Indiana
4:00 PM PDT	Asante 23'; Guenzatti 40'; Blake (yellow card) 45+1'; Martínez (yellow card) 78'	Report	Robinson 17'; Volesky 58'; Yoseke 63'; Boone (yellow card) 85'	Stadium: Carroll Stadium; Attendance: 10,038; Referee: Greg Dopka

April 29, 2023 8	Monterey Bay FC	0–0	Rio Grande Valley FC	Seaside, California
7:00 PM PDT	Robinson (yellow card) 49'; Dixon (yellow card) 56'; Boone (yellow card) 63'	Report	Cabezas (yellow card) 57'; Ritondale (yellow card) 60'; Ruiz (yellow card) 84'	Stadium: Cardinale Stadium; Attendance: 4,003; Referee: Alexis Da Silva

May 5, 2023 9	Monterey Bay FC	2–2	Pittsburgh Riverhounds SC	Seaside, California
7:00 PM PDT	Lara (yellow card) 36'; Dixon 44'; Volesky 90+1'	Report	Dikwa 16', 74'; Dossantos (yellow card) 85'; Lilley (yellow card) 58'	Stadium: Cardinale Stadium; Attendance: 3,716; Referee: Corbyn May

May 13, 2023 10	New Mexico United	2–1	Monterey Bay FC	Albuquerque, New Mexico
6:00 PM PDT	Waggoner 22'; Swartz (yellow card) 37'; Hamilton (yellow card) 53' (yellow-red card) 56'; Rivas 59', (yellow card) 88'; Prince (yellow card) 76'; Portillo (yellow card) 86'; Tambakis (yellow card) 90+4'	Report	Volesky (yellow card) 28'; Rebollar 80'; Enríquez (yellow card) 90+1'	Stadium: Isotopes Park; Attendance: 9,874; Referee: Sergii Demianchuk

May 20, 2023 11	Charleston Battery	1–0	Monterey Bay FC	Mount Pleasant, South Carolina
2:00 PM PDT	Rodríguez 8', (yellow card) 55'; Archer (yellow card) 69'	Report	Martinez (yellow card) 22'; Yoseke (yellow card) 56'; Fehr (yellow card) 73'	Stadium: Patriots Point Soccer Complex; Attendance: 3,123; Referee: Jeremy Scheer

May 31, 2023 12	Monterey Bay FC	0–0	FC Tulsa	Seaside, California
7:00 PM PDT	Rebollar (yellow card) 16'; Murphy (yellow card) 90+7'	Report	Yosef (yellow card) 43'; Armour (yellow card) 60'	Stadium: Cardinale Stadium; Attendance: 3,431; Referee: Gerald Flores

June 3, 2023 13	Monterey Bay FC	4–1	Loudoun United FC	Seaside, California
7:00 PM PDT	Doner (yellow card) 6'; Murphy (yellow card) 26'; Gleadle 33'; Boone 54'; Volesky 89'; Dixon 90+1'	Report	Hopkins (yellow card) 16'; Santos (yellow card) 23'; ElMedkhar 38'; Ramírez (yellow card) 76'	Stadium: Cardinale Stadium; Attendance: 3,054

June 10, 2023 14	Las Vegas Lights	1–2	Monterey Bay FC	Las Vegas, Nevada
7:30 PM PDT	Lage 58'; Torres (yellow card) 87'	Report	Doner 42'; Murphy (yellow card) 55'; Gleadle 89'	Stadium: Cashman Field; Attendance: 2,300; Referee: Nabil Bensalah

June 17, 2023 15	Sacramento Republic FC	0–1	Monterey Bay FC	Sacramento, California
8:00 PM PDT	Cicerone (yellow card) 61'	Report	Fehr (yellow card) 11'; Volesky 18'; Murphy (yellow card) 41'; Martinez (yellow card) 86'; Siaha (yellow card) 90+1'	Stadium: Heart Health Park; Attendance: 11,569; Referee: Abdou Ndiaye

June 24, 2023 16	Monterey Bay FC	1–0	Miami FC	Seaside, California
7:00 PM PDT	Greene (yellow card) 27'; Volesky 67', (yellow card) 90+2'	Report		Stadium: Cardinale Stadium; Attendance: 3,910; Referee: Corbyn May

July 1, 2023 17	Orange County SC	3–1	Monterey Bay FC	Irvine, California
7:00 PM PDT	Powers (yellow card) 33'; Amang 70', 90+1' (pen.); Lambe 78'; Iloski (yellow card) 83'	Report	Roberts 33'; Rebollar (yellow card) 52'; Martinez (yellow card) 56'; Fehr (yellow card) 64'; Doner (yellow card) 75'	Stadium: Championship Soccer Stadium; Attendance: 5,500; Referee: Alex Beehler

July 4, 2023 18	Colorado Springs Switchbacks	4–0	Monterey Bay FC	Colorado Springs, Colorado
6:00 PM PDT	Tejada 2'; Echevarria 46', 83'; Williams 73' (pen.)	Report		Stadium: Weidner Field; Attendance: 8,023; Referee: Matthew Thompson

July 8, 2023 19	Monterey Bay FC	0–0	El Paso Locomotive	Seaside, California
7:00 PM PDT	Rebollar (yellow card) 42'; Murphy (yellow card) 54'; Fehr (yellow card) 57'	Report	Calvillo (yellow card) 35'; Díaz (yellow card) 69'; Borelli (yellow card) 88'	Stadium: Cardinale Stadium; Attendance: 3,711; Referee: Brandon Stevis

July 15, 2023 20	Monterey Bay FC	1–3	Oakland Roots	Seaside, California
7:00 PM PDT	Fehr (yellow card) 11'; Dixon 29'; Dawkins (yellow card) 45+1'; Roberts (yellow card) 46'; Robinson (yellow card) 88'	Report	Rodriguez 15' (pen.), 33'; Cedeno (yellow card) 38'; Barbir (yellow card) 53'; Gómez (yellow card) 64'; Diaz 78', (yellow card) 90+4'; Nane (yellow card) 83'	Stadium: Cardinale Stadium; Attendance: 5,046; Referee: Elijio Arreguin

July 22, 2023 21	Detroit City FC	1–0	Monterey Bay FC	Hamtramck, Michigan
4:30 PM PDT	Levis (yellow card) 49'; Diop (yellow card) 62'; Lara 75' (o.g.)	Report	Doner (yellow card) 52'	Stadium: Keyworth Stadium; Attendance: 6,928; Referee: Sergii Demianchuk

July 29, 2023 22	Monterey Bay FC	0–2	Phoenix Rising FC	Seaside, California
7:00 PM PDT	Okoli (yellow card) 74'	Report	Arteaga 23'; Trejo 45+2'; Traore (yellow card) 86'	Stadium: Cardinale Stadium; Attendance: 3,578; Referee: Olvin Oliva

August 5, 2023 23	Monterey Bay FC	0–1	Sacramento Republic FC	Seaside, California
7:00 PM PDT	Boone (yellow card) 42'; Martinez (yellow card) 74'; Maldonado (yellow card) 88'	Report	Cicerone 35'; Desmond (yellow card) 69' (yellow-red card) 86'; López (yellow card) 72'	Stadium: Cardinale Stadium; Attendance: 3,820; Referee: Elton García

August 12, 2023 24	Tampa Bay Rowdies	4–1	Monterey Bay FC	St. Petersburg, Florida
4:30 PM PDT	Guillén (yellow card) 45+1'; Dennis 45+7' (pen.); LaCava 51'; Williams 58'; Martínez 88'	Report	Fehr 28', (yellow card) 71'; Murphy (yellow card) 45'; Martinez (yellow card) 65'; Rebollar (yellow card) 88'	Stadium: Al Lang Stadium; Attendance: 6,251; Referee: Ted Unkel

August 19, 2023 25	San Antonio FC	0–0	Monterey Bay FC	San Antonio, Texas
6:00 PM PDT	Hernández (yellow card) 39' (yellow-red card) 79'; Patiño (yellow card) 58'; Gomez (yellow card) 87'; Farr (yellow card) 87'	Report	Boone (yellow card) 79'; Doner (yellow card) 86'; Greene (yellow card) 87'	Stadium: Toyota Field; Attendance: 7,021; Referee: Alejo Calume

August 26, 2023 26	Monterey Bay FC	2–1	Colorado Springs Switchbacks	Seaside, California
7:00 PM PDT	Fehr (yellow card) 56'; Herrera (yellow card) 76'; Volesky 89' (pen.), 90+4' (pen.)	Report	Tejada (yellow card) 8'; Skundrich (yellow card) 20'; Foster (yellow card) 33' (yellow-red card) 59'; Fjeldberg (yellow card) 45' (yellow-red card) 64'; Chapman 77'; Williams (yellow card) 90'; Musa (red card) 90+7'	Stadium: Cardinale Stadium; Attendance: 5,720; Referee: Matthew Corrigan

September 2, 2023 27	El Paso Locomotive FC	1–2	Monterey Bay FC	El Paso, Texas
6:30 PM PDT	Petrović 50'; Garcia (yellow card) 90+3'	Report	Dixon 44'; Okoli 75'	Stadium: Southwest University Park; Attendance: 7,144; Referee: Natalie Simon

September 9, 2023 28	Memphis 901 FC	0–1	Monterey Bay FC	Memphis, Tennessee
5:00 PM PDT	Smith (yellow card) 39'; McFadden (yellow card) 42'	Report	Dixon 31' (pen.); Rebollar (yellow card) 90+3'	Stadium: AutoZone Park; Attendance: 3,238; Referee: Abdou Ndiaye

September 16, 2023 29	Monterey Bay FC	3–2	Las Vegas Lights FC	Seaside, California
7:00 PM PDT	Lara (yellow card) 8', (goal) 62'; Okoli 29'; Martinez (yellow card) 56'; Baca 74'; Murphy (yellow card) 90'	Report	Lage 17'; González 18'; Zali (yellow card) 31'; Oteng (yellow card) 68'	Stadium: Cardinale Stadium; Attendance: 4,617; Referee: Corbyn May

September 20, 2023 30	Monterey Bay FC	2–3	San Diego Loyal SC	Seaside, California
7:00 PM PDT	Gleadle 23'; Lara 37'	Report	Perez 44'; Martin (yellow card) 45+1'; Riley (yellow card) 82'; Gnaulati 90', 90+3'	Stadium: Cardinale Stadium; Attendance: 3,427; Referee: Melvin Rivas

September 23, 2023 31	Oakland Roots	2–2	Monterey Bay FC	Hayward, California
7:00 PM PDT	Barbir 44'; Matsoso (yellow card) 65'; Donasiyano (yellow card) 79'; Hackshaw 90'	Report	Dixon 3'; Okoli 64'	Stadium: Pioneer Stadium; Attendance: 4,099; Referee: John Griggs

September 30, 2023 32	San Diego Loyal SC	4–1	Monterey Bay FC	San Diego, California
7:00 PM PDT	Damus 26', 73', 90+6', (yellow card) 66'; Guzmán 29'; Adams (yellow card) 90'	Report	Lara (yellow card) 11'; Doner 19'	Stadium: Torero Stadium; Attendance: 5,671; Referee: Benjamin Meyer

October 8, 2023 33	Birmingham Legion FC	2–0	Monterey Bay FC	Birmingham, Alabama
2:00 PM PDT	Martínez (yellow card) 24'; Tabortetaka (yellow card) 28'; Agudelo (yellow card) 46', (goal) 60'; Crognale (yellow card) 52'; Kasim (yellow card) 73'; Smith 80'	Report	Okoli (yellow card) 36'	Stadium: Protective Stadium; Attendance: 6,329; Referee: Elvis Osmanovic

October 14, 2023 34	Monterey Bay FC	0–1	Orange County SC	Seaside, California
7:00 PM PDT	Glasser (yellow card) 76'	Report	Lankford (yellow card) 22'; Iloski 39'; Partida (yellow card) 88' (yellow-red card) 90+4'; Fox (yellow card) 90+8'	Stadium: Cardinale Stadium; Attendance: 5,278; Referee: Eric Tattersall

=== U.S. Open Cup ===
Monterey Bay FC entered into the tournament in the 2nd Round.

April 5 2nd Round	Central Valley Fuego FC (California)	1–3 (a.e.t.)	(California) Monterey Bay FC	Fresno, California
7:00 PM PDT	Dabo (yellow card) 31'; Ramos (yellow card) 51'; Cerritos (yellow card) 81'; North (yellow card) 90'; Vasquez 116'; Forth (yellow card) 120+1'	Report	Lara (yellow card) 3'; Martinez (yellow card) 37'; Greene (yellow card) 41'; Fehr (yellow card) 63'; Roberts (yellow card) 77'; Volesky 97'; Dixon 110'; Boone (yellow card) 117'; Gleadle 120+1'	Stadium: Fresno State Soccer Stadium; Attendance: 3,057; Referee: Elijio Arreguin

April 25 3rd Round	Monterey Bay FC (California)	1–0	(California) San Jose Earthquakes	Seaside, California
7:00 PM PDT	Volesky 26'; Martinez (yellow card) 41'; Rebollar (yellow card) 87'; Siaha (yellow card) 90+3'	Report	Trauco (yellow card) 32'	Stadium: Cardinale Stadium; Attendance: 4,010; Referee: Christopher Calderon

May 9 Round of 32	Monterey Bay FC (California)	2–2 (a.e.t.) (4–5 p)	(California) Los Angeles FC (MLS)	Seaside, California
7:30 PM PDT	Dawkins 90'; Maldonado 94'	Report	Torres 25'; Maia 105'	Stadium: Cardinale Stadium; Attendance: 5,808; Referee: Cristian Campo
	Penalties
	Volesky (penalty scored); Dawkins (penalty scored); Greene (penalty scored); Okoli (penalty missed); Boone (penalty scored); Fehr (penalty missed)		(penalty scored) Maia; (penalty scored) Ordaz; (penalty missed) Crisostomo; (penalty scored) Moyado; (penalty scored) Jakupović; (penalty scored) Rosales
