= Morey Doner =

Canadian soccer player (born 1994)

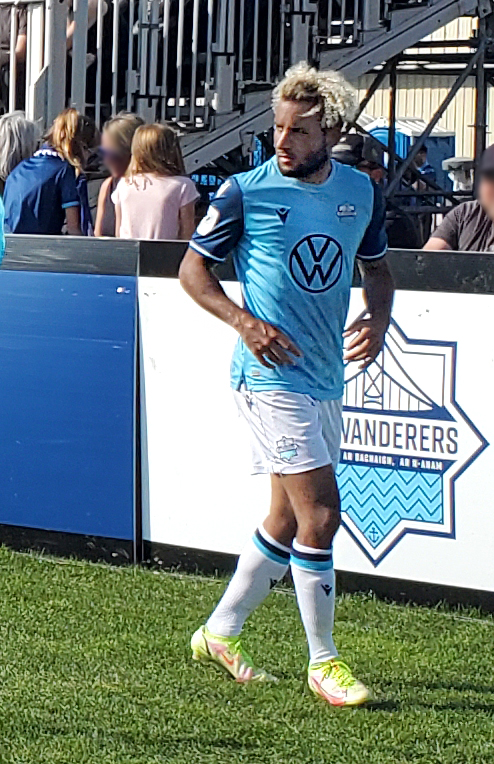
- Doner playing for HFX Wanderers in 2021

Personal information
- Date of birth: March 25, 1994 (age 32)
- Place of birth: Collingwood, Ontario, Canada
- Height: 1.73 m (5 ft 8 in)
- Position: Right-back

Team information
- Current team: Vancouver FC

Youth career
- Collingwood United SC

Senior career*
Years	Team	Apps	(Gls)
2014	Durham United	8	(0)
2016	Palm Beach Suns	7	(0)
2016–2018	Aurora FC	22	(3)
2019–2020	York9	32	(1)
2021	HFX Wanderers	20	(0)
2022–2024	Monterey Bay FC	102	(4)
2025	Detroit City	6	(1)
2025	Oakland Roots	18	(2)
2026–	Vancouver FC	28	(2)
- * Club domestic league appearances and goals as of October 27, 2026

Morey Doner (born March 25, 1994) is a Canadian professional soccer player who plays for Vancouver FC in the Canadian Premier League.

== Club career ==
=== Semi-professional ===
In 2014, Doner played for Durham United FC in League1 Ontario. Afterwards, he returned to his hometown of Collingwood, Ontario, a town of just 21,000 people, where he played in recreational men's leagues. In 2016, he went to Brazil, where he had a pay-to-play opportunity in Brazil in the Campeonato Paulista Série A3, the lowest professional state league in São Paulo, which cost him $1500 per month. He was on a trial, but was not able to sign or play, due to not being able to obtain a visa.

After his stint in Brazil, Doner joined American USL Premier Development League side Palm Beach Suns FC, making seven appearances that season.

Late in the 2016 season, Doner joined League1 Ontario side Aurora FC after a trial, making one appearance at the end of 2016 and then making five appearances the following season. 2018 proved to be a breakout year for Doner, as he was named team captain, played every minute of every game for Aurora, totalling sixteen appearances and three goals. That season, he was also named to the league All-Star Team at the end of the season. While playing in Aurora, he continued to live in his hometown of Collingwood, making a two-hour commute for every practice and home match. While he had opportunities to join other teams in 2018 (including a deal to be potentially the first League1 Ontario player to fetch a transfer fee), Doner remained with Aurora, which led to former coach Jim Brennan coming to scout him and inviting him to attend a York9 FC combine.

=== Canadian Premier League ===
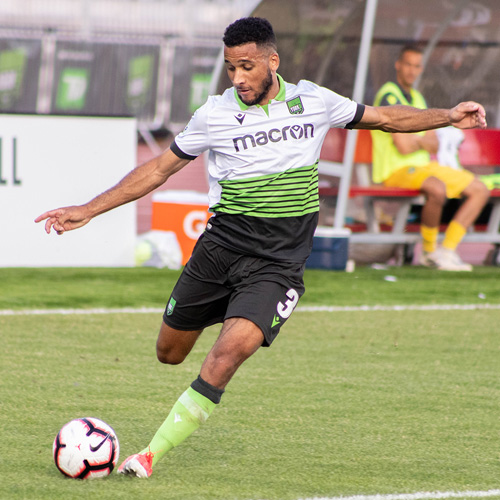
Morey Doner playing for York9 in 2019

On February 8, 2019, Doner signed his first professional contract with Canadian Premier League side York9, rejoining his former coach at Aurora, Jim Brennan. On May 25, 2019, he made his league debut as a starter in York's inaugural league home match against Forge FC. Doner scored his first goal for York9 against Valour FC on July 1. On October 24, Doner announced on Twitter he would remain with York9 for the 2020 season. On April 23, 2020, York9 announced a contract extension that would keep Doner with the Nine Stripes through the 2021 CPL season. However, despite the earlier contract extension, in November 2020, York9 announced Doner and the club had mutually agreed to part ways.

In January 2021, Doner signed with HFX Wanderers to a one-year contract, with an option for 2022. Doner had a good individual 2021 season, contributing with three assists (tied for the team lead), and making his presence felt by creating many chances, using his speed to make runs down the flanks, led the team in duels won, and was also the Wanderers most fouled player. However, the Wanderers just missed out on qualifying for the playoffs, and Doner did not play in the deciding final game. After the season ended, he announced that he would not be returning to the club.

=== USL Championship ===
In February 2022, he signed with Monterey Bay FC in the USL Championship. Doner scored his first goal for Monterey Bay on June 15, 2022, during a 3–2 loss to LA Galaxy II. After playing in every match in his first season, he signed a two-year extension through the 2024 season.

In December 2024, Doner signed with Detroit City FC on a two-year contract, beginning in January 2025.

In May 2025, Doner moved to Oakland Roots SC on a transfer, after having only made six appearances with Detroit City. He made his debut on May 31, 2025 in a 2025 USL Cup match against AV Alta FC, where he scored a goal (some sources credit it as an own goal for Carlos Ávilez). At the end of the 2025 season, he departed the club.

=== Return to Canada ===
In January 2026, he returned to the Canadian Premier League, signing a two-year contract with Vancouver FC.

== Club statistics ==
As of October 25, 2025

Club	Season	League			Playoffs		National Cup		League Cup		Total	
Club	Season	Division	Apps	Goals	Apps	Goals	Apps	Goals	Apps	Goals	Apps	Goals
Durham United FC	2014	League1 Ontario	8	0	—		—		0	0	8	0
Palm Beach Suns	2016	Premier Development League	7	0	—		—		—		7	0
Aurora FC	2016	League1 Ontario	1	0	—		—		0	0	1	0
Aurora FC	2017	League1 Ontario	5	0	—		—		?	?	5	0
Aurora FC	2018	League1 Ontario	16	3	—		—		1	0	16	3
Aurora FC	Total		22	3	0	0	0	0	1	0	23	3
York9	2019	Canadian Premier League	25	1	—		4	0	—		29	1
York9	2020	Canadian Premier League	7	0	—		—		—		7	0
York9	Total		32	1	4	0	0	0	0	0	36	1
HFX Wanderers	2021	Canadian Premier League	20	0	—		1	0	—		21	0
Monterey Bay	2022	USL Championship	34	1	—		1	0	—		35	1
Monterey Bay	2023	USL Championship	34	2	—		3	0	—		37	2
Monterey Bay	2024	USL Championship	34	1	—		0	0	—		35	1
Monterey Bay	Total		102	4	0	0	5	0	0	0	107	4
Detroit City	2025	USL Championship	6	0	0	0	1	1	0	0	7	1
Oakland Roots	2025	USL Championship	18	2	0	0	0	0	3	2 (Note: credited as own goal by some sources)	21	4
Career total			210	10	0	0	11	1	4	2	225	13

== Honours ==
Individual

- League1 Ontario All-Star: 2018
