= Antony Siaha =

Cameroonian footballer (born 1998)

Personal information
- Full name: Antony Siaha
- Date of birth: April 27, 1998 (age 28)
- Place of birth: Yaoundé, Cameroon
- Height: 6 ft 6 in (1.98 m)
- Position: Goalkeeper

Team information
- Current team: Hartford Athletic
- Number: 77

College career
Years	Team	Apps	(Gls)
2016	CSU Bakersfield Roadrunners	2	(0)
2017	Ottawa University Arizona Spirit	13	(0)
2018	Benedictine Mesa Redhawks		

Senior career*
Years	Team	Apps	(Gls)
2020	San Diego 1904	0	(0)
2021	San Diego Sockers (indoor)	0	(0)
2021–2022	San Diego Loyal	0	(0)
2022–2024	Monterey Bay	58	(0)
2025	Indy Eleven	0	(0)
2025–	Hartford Athletic	55	(0)
- * Club domestic league appearances and goals as of 16:01, 26 October 2026 (UTC)

Antony Siaha (born 27 April 1998) is a Cameroonian footballer who plays as a goalkeeper for USL Championship club Hartford Athletic.

== Career ==
=== Early professional career ===
Siaha spent his early professional career playing as the primary backup for three different San Diego clubs in three different leagues. He first signed with San Diego 1904 for the 2020 NISA season. After that he made the switch to indoor soccer and joined the San Diego Sockers for their 2021 MASL season. When Siaha signed for the Sockers, it was believed that he was the tallest goalkeeper at that point in MASL history, though he did not make an official appearance for the indoor club. He departed the Sockers to join San Diego Loyal for their 2021 USL Championship season.

=== Monterey Bay ===
On 20 May 2022, Siaha officially left San Diego Loyal and joined USL Championship expansion side Monterey Bay FC. He had initially trialed with the club before being signed. On 10 July 2022, Siaha made the first start of his professional career in his debut for Monterey Bay. He contributed to a shutout in a 2-0 win away to Orange County SC. Siaha earned Team of the Week honors for his performance. The next week he repeated a shutout against fellow USL Championship expansion side Detroit City in Monterey Bay's first ever scoreless draw. Siaha would go on to have a total of eight clean sheets in his seventeen appearances for the 2022 season. This would him Monterey Bay's Golden Glove award for the season. Prior to the 2023 season Siaha signed a contract extension with Monterey Bay for two more seasons. Following the 2024 season, Monterey declined to pick up his contract option and he became a free agent.

=== Indy Eleven ===
On 10 December 2024, USL Championship club Indy Eleven announced the signing of Siaha ahead of the 2025 season. However on 25 February 2025, his contract was mutually terminated.

=== Hartford Athletic ===
On 25 February 2025, Siaha signed with USL Championship club Hartford Athletic. He made his debut on 8 March in a 0–2 away loss to Lexington SC.

Siaha had a clean sheet in Hartford's 1–0 win in the 2025 USL Cup final, guiding the club to the first trophy in their history.
