= Alex Covelo =

Spanish football coach

Personal information
- Full name: Alex Covelo Lafita
- Date of birth: 19 May 1978 (age 48)
- Place of birth: Barcelona, Spain
- Position: Goalkeeper

Youth career
- Sant Andreu
- Barcelona

Senior career*
Years	Team	Apps	(Gls)
- Hospitalet Atlètic
1998–1999	Hospitalet		
1999	Cornellà		
1999–2001	Europa		
2001–2004	Premià		

Managerial career
- 2013–2014: San Marino Calcio (assistant)
- 2014: San Marino Calcio
- 2016–2017: Atlètic Sant Just
- 2017: Sabadell (youth)
- 2022: San Jose Earthquakes II
- 2022: San Jose Earthquakes (interim)
- 2026–: Monterey Bay FC
- * Club domestic league appearances and goals

Alex Covelo Lafita (born 19 May 1978), is a Spanish football coach who currently serves as the head coach of Monterey Bay FC in the USL Championship. He is a former player who played as a goalkeeper.

== Playing career ==
Born in Barcelona, Catalonia, Covelo played for the youth sides of UE Sant Andreu and FC Barcelona. He made his senior debut with CE L'Hospitalet's reserve team CE L'Hospitalet Atlètic before being promoted to the first team for the 1998–99 season.

Covelo subsequently represented Tercera División sides UE Cornellà, CE Europa and CE Premià.

== Coaching career ==
While playing for Premià, Covelo also worked as a fitness coach for CF Badalona. He was under the same role at Greek side Aris Thessaloniki FC during the 2006–07 season before returning to his previous club.

Covelo joined RCD Espanyol's Juvenil A side in 2008, as a fitness coach. He left in July 2013, and joined Fernando de Argila's staff at San Marino Calcio, as his assistant.

On 16 May 2014, Covelo was appointed manager of San Marino, but was sacked on 10 November after 12 matches. After working as a football instructor for a period, he took over hometown side Atlètic Sant Just in 2016.

In January 2017, Covelo was named in charge of CE Sabadell FC's Juvenil squad, but left the side on 13 April. Twelve days later, he was hired as a Director of Methodology at Major League Soccer club San Jose Earthquakes.

Covelo also worked as an assistant coach of the Quakes on two different occasions, under interim managers Chris Leitch and Steve Ralston in 2017 and 2018, respectively. Ahead of the 2022 season, he was named manager of San Jose Earthquakes II as the club started a team to play in the MLS Next Pro.

On 19 April 2022, after Argentine coach Matias Almeyda left the team on mutual consent, Covelo was appointed interim coach of the team. Despite the appointment of Luchi Gonzalez as the new head coach on 17 August, it was announced that Covelo would remain as an interim until the end of the season.

On 29 April 2026, Covelo was appointed head coach of USL Championship club Monterey Bay FC.
