= Nevello Yoseke =

South Sudanese footballer

Personal information
- Full name: Nevello Cosmas Yoseke
- Date of birth: March 17, 1996 (age 30)
- Place of birth: Khartoum, Sudan
- Height: 1.80 m (5 ft 11 in)
- Positions: Defender; midfielder

Youth career
- 2007–????: Ottawa Internationals SC
- –2011: Ottawa Fury
- 2011–2012: Cruzeiro
- 2013–2015: Montréal Impact

Senior career*
Years	Team	Apps	(Gls)
2015–2016	FC Montréal	25	(1)
2017	IF Mölndal Fotboll	9	(1)
2017	Oskarshamns AIK	5	(1)
2019	AFC Ann Arbor	3	(0)
2019	Ottawa South United	8	(0)
2019–2020	Saint-Priest B		
2020	Ottawa South United	3	(0)
2021	Des Moines Menace	2	(0)
2021	Dayton Dutch Lions	7	(0)
2021	Kalamazoo FC	1	(0)
2021	New Amsterdam FC	11	(0)
2023	Monterey Bay FC	14	(1)
Total		88+	(4+)

International career^{‡}
2013	Canada U17	1	(0)
2023–2024	South Sudan	6	(0)
- * Club domestic league appearances and goals as of 14 October 2023 ‡ National team caps and goals as of 10 September 2024

Nevello Cosmas Yoseke (born March 17, 1996) is a South Sudanese former footballer who played as a midfielder. A former youth international for Canada, he played for the South Sudan national team. He currently serves as the head scout for the CF Montréal Academy.

== Early life ==
Yoseke was born in Kharthoum, Sudan and has four siblings. When he was four years old, he moved to Cairo, Egypt with his family, before once again his family moved to Ottawa, Ontario when he was ten. He began playing organized youth soccer when he was 11 with Ottawa Internationals SC. Later he was part of the Ottawa Fury Academy. After a few years in the Fury system, in September 2011, he had a tryout with the U16 side of Brazilian top division team Cruzeiro, where he impressed and stayed for four months before returning to Canada due to a visa issue. Upon his return, he was seen by a scout and soon joined the Montreal Impact Academy.

== Club career ==
In 2015, after his time in the Montreal Impact Academy he signed with FC Montreal of the second-tier USL, the second team of the Impact. He made his debut on August 29, as a substitute, against the Harrisburg City Islanders.

In 2017, he joined Swedish third division side Oskarshamns AIK.

Afterwards, he joined French club Saint-Priest on trial for three months, however he encountered visa issues and was unable to be signed. He subsequently returned to Canada and trained with his hometown club Ottawa Fury FC of the USL Championship.

In April 2019, he signed with AFC Ann Arbor of the American fourth tier National Premier Soccer League.

After the season, he returned to Canada, playing with Ottawa South United in League1 Ontario.

He subsequently returned to Saint-Priest before returning to Canada in June 2020. He returned to Ottawa South United, now part of the Première Ligue de soccer du Québec.

In 2021, he began the season with the Des Moines Menace of USL League Two, before moving to the Dayton Dutch Lions of USL League Two, before ending it with Kalamazoo FC.

Late in 2021, he joined New Amsterdam FC in National Independent Soccer Association.

In 2022, he played amateur soccer with Gloucester Celtic FC, helping them win their second Challenge Trophy, as Canadian national amateur champions.

On April 7, 2023, Yoseke returned to professional play by signing with Monterey Bay FC of the USL Championship. He left Monterey Bay following their 2023 season.

== International career ==
In 2013, Yoseke was named to the Canada U17 national team for the 2013 FIFA U-17 World Cup. He made his debut on October 19, against Austria U17.

On 31 August 2023, Yoseke was called up to the South Sudan national team for a set of 2023 Africa Cup of Nations qualification matches in September 2023. He debuted for South Sudan in a 4–0 loss to Mali on 8 September 2023.

== Post-playing career ==
In April 2025, Yoseke was named the Head Scout for the CF Montréal Academy.

== Career statistics ==
As of October 14, 2025

Appearances and goals by club, season and competition
Club	Season	League			Playoffs		National cup		Other		Total	
Club	Season	Division	Apps	Goals	Apps	Goals	Apps	Goals	Apps	Goals	Apps	Goals
FC Montreal	2015	USL	3	0	—		—		—		3	0
FC Montreal	2016	USL	22	1	—		—		—		22	1
FC Montreal	Total		25	1	0	0	0	0	0	0	25	1
IF Mölndal	2017	Göteborgs FF - Division 4	9	1	—		—		—		9	1
Oskarshamns AIK	2017	Ettan Södra	5	1	—		2	0	—		7	1
AFC Ann Arbor	2019	NPSL	3	0	0	0	0	0	—		3	0
Ottawa South United	2019	League1 Ontario	8	0	—		—		—		8	0
AS Saint-Priest B	2019–20	Régional 2										
Ottawa South United	2020	PLSQ	3	0	—		—		—		3	0
Des Moines Menace	2021	USL League Two	2	0	—		—		—		2	0
Dayton Dutch Lions	2021	USL League Two	7	0	—		—		—		7	0
Kalamazoo FC	2021	USL League Two	1	0	2	0	—		—		3	0
New Amsterdam FC	2021	NISA	11	0	—		—		0	0	11	0
Monterey Bay FC	2023	USL Championship	14	1	—		2	0	—		16	1
Career total			88	4	2	0	4	0	0	0	94	4
