= Adrian Rebollar =

American soccer player (born 1999)

Personal information
- Full name: Adrian Rebollar-Cortes
- Date of birth: November 12, 1999 (age 26)
- Place of birth: Watsonville, California, United States
- Height: 1.68 m (5 ft 6 in)
- Position: Midfielder

Team information
- Current team: Monterey Bay
- Number: 7

Youth career
- Santa Cruz Breakers

College career
Years	Team	Apps	(Gls)
2017–2021	Cal State Monterey Bay Otters	63	(16)

Senior career*
Years	Team	Apps	(Gls)
2019	Lionsbridge FC	14	(0)
2022–	Monterey Bay	125	(12)
- * Club domestic league appearances and goals as of 18:47, 9 November 2026 (UTC)

Adrian Rebollar-Cortes (born November 12, 1999) is an American soccer player who plays as a midfielder for Monterey Bay F.C. in the USL Championship.

== Career ==
=== Youth career ===
Rebollar played club soccer with the Santa Cruz Breakers academy team. In 2017, Rebollar attended California State University, Monterey Bay to play college soccer. Over four seasons, Rebollar made 63 appearances for the Otters, scoring 16 goals and tallying 14 assists. He was also a four-time All-California Collegiate Athletic Association honoree.

In 2019, Rebollar also played with USL League Two club Lionsbridge FC, making 14 appearances for them, tallying a single assist.

=== Professional ===
On March 11, 2022, Rebollar signed with USL Championship club Monterey Bay ahead of their inaugural season. He made his professional debut the following day on March 12, 2022, appearing as an 58th–minute substitute during a 2–4 loss to Phoenix Rising and scoring the team's second goal in the 87th–minute.
