= Grant Robinson (soccer) =

American soccer player (born 1998)

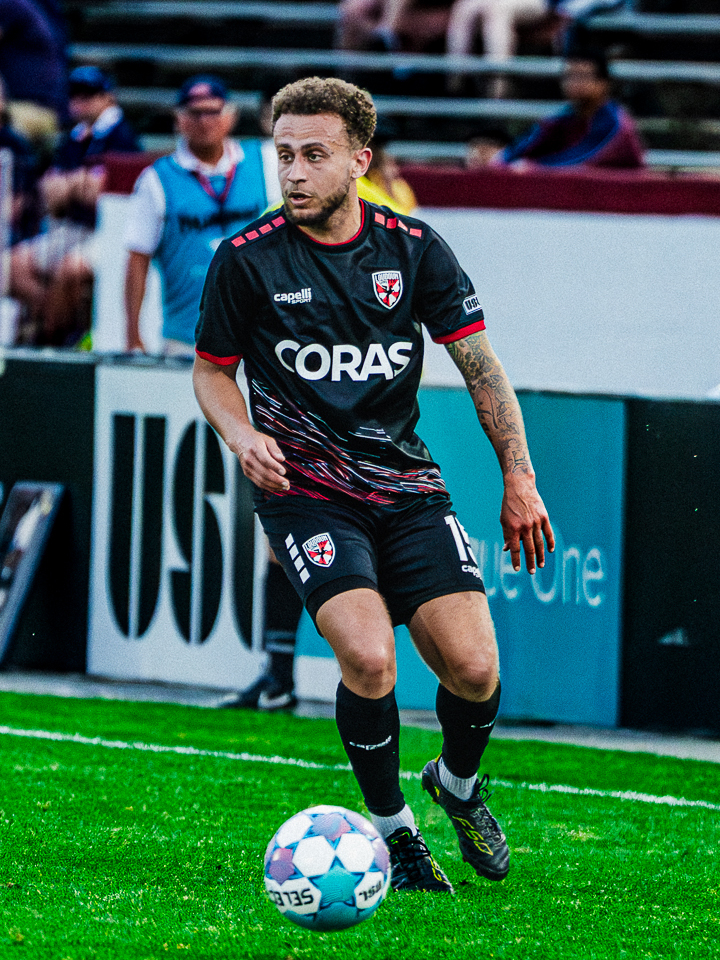
- Robinson with Loudoun United FC in 2026

Personal information
- Date of birth: August 15, 1998 (age 28)
- Place of birth: Columbia, Maryland, United States
- Height: 5 ft 9 in (1.75 m)
- Position: Left back

Team information
- Current team: FC Tulsa
- Number: 31

Youth career
- 2009–2013: Baltimore Bays
- 2013–2015: Baltimore Celtic
- 2015–2016: D.C. United

College career
Years	Team	Apps	(Gls)
2016–2019	George Mason Patriots	63	(6)

Senior career*
Years	Team	Apps	(Gls)
2018	FC Baltimore	1	(0)
2019	The Villages SC	13	(1)
2020	Las Vegas Lights	16	(0)
2021	Rio Grande Valley FC	9	(0)
2022–2025	Monterey Bay	75	(2)
2026	Loudoun United	0	(0)
2026–	FC Tulsa	5	(0)

International career^{‡}
2016	United States U19		
- * Club domestic league appearances and goals as of November 10, 2026 ‡ National team caps and goals as of February 19, 2019

Grant Robinson (born August 15, 1998) is an American soccer player who currently plays as a defender for FC Tulsa in the USL Championship.

== Career ==
=== Youth and college ===
Robinson played four years of college soccer at George Mason University between 2016 and 2019, making 63 appearances, scoring 6 goals and tallying 4 assists.

While at college, Robinson also appeared in the NPSL for FC Baltimore in 2018, and in the USL PDL for The Villages SC in 2019.

=== Professional ===
On March 4, 2020, it was announced Robinson had joined USL Championship side Las Vegas Lights ahead of their 2020 season. He made his debut on March 7, 2020, starting in a 1–1 draw with San Diego Loyal SC.

On March 11, 2021, Robinson joined USL Championship side Rio Grande Valley FC.

Robinson signed with Monterey Bay FC ahead of their inaugural USL Championship season on February 10, 2022. Robinson was included in the starting 11 for Monterey Bay's inaugural match, a 4–2 loss to Phoenix Rising FC. Robinson departed the club as a free agent following the 2025 season after spending four years with the club.

Robinson signed a 25-day contract with Loudoun United FC on March 13, 2026.

On May 14, 2026 FC Tulsa signed Robinson to a 25-day contract. Robinson subsequently re-signed with FC Tulsa for the remainder of the 2026 USL Championship season on June 10, 2026.
