= Mobi Fehr =

American soccer player (born 1994)

Personal information
- Date of birth: December 13, 1994 (age 31)
- Place of birth: New York, United States
- Height: 1.82 m (6 ft 0 in)
- Position: Midfielder

Youth career
- 2010–2012: Tokyo Verdy
- 2012: FC Basel

Senior career*
Years	Team	Apps	(Gls)
2013	Portland Timbers	0	(0)
2014–2015	SC Sagamihara	59	(3)
2016–2018	Hoàng Anh Gia Lai	24	(2)
2019–2020	Las Vegas Lights	39	(0)
2022–2025	Monterey Bay	104	(6)

International career
2010–2011	United States U17	32	(1)
2012	United States U20		
- * Club domestic league appearances and goals as of October 29, 2025

Mobi Fehr (born December 13, 1994, in New York City) is an American soccer player who plays as a midfielder.

== Playing career ==
Growing up in Japan, Fehr played in the Tokyo Verdy academy.

Fehr was on the roster of Major League Soccer club Portland Timbers during the 2013 season, but did not appear in a first-team game. In 2014, he moved to J3 League club SC Sagamihara.

=== Hoàng Anh Gia Lai ===
In November 2016, Fehr joined Vietnamese V.League 1 club Hoàng Anh Gia Lai on a one-year deal.

=== Monterey Bay FC ===
On February 14, 2022, Monterey Bay FC announced that they had signed Fehr ahead of their inaugural season. Fehr was included in the starting 11 for Monterey Bay's inaugural match, a 4–2 loss to Phoenix Rising FC. Fehr scored his first goal for Monterey Bay on May 21, 2022, the winner in a 2–0 victory over Louisville City FC. Fehr left the club as a free agent following the 2025 season.

== Personal life ==
Fehr was born in New York City to a Swiss father and Japanese mother. He moved with his family to Tokyo in 2000.

== Club statistics ==
Updated to 22 February 2016.

Club performance			League		Cup		Total	
Season	Club	League	Apps	Goals	Apps	Goals	Apps	Goals
Japan			League		Emperor's Cup		Total	
2014	SC Sagamihara	J3 League	32	3	–		32	3
2015	SC Sagamihara	J3 League	27	0	–		27	0
Total			59	3	0	0	59	3
