= Jesse Maldonado =

American soccer player

Personal information
- Date of birth: September 1, 2002 (age 24)
- Place of birth: San Diego, California, United States
- Height: 1.70 m (5 ft 7 in)
- Positions: Forward; winger

Team information
- Current team: Chattanooga Red Wolves
- Number: 27

College career
Years	Team	Apps	(Gls)
2021	Yavapai Roughriders	14	(11)

Senior career*
Years	Team	Apps	(Gls)
2021	FC Arizona	7	(2)
2022–2023	Monterey Bay	17	(1)
2025	FC Arizona		
2026	Oakland Roots	1	(0)
2026–	Chattanooga Red Wolves	3	(0)
- * Club domestic league appearances and goals as of 16:56, 31 October 2026 (UTC)

Jesse Maldonado (born September 1, 2002) is an American soccer player who plays as a forward for Chattanooga Red Wolves.

== Career ==
=== Youth career ===
Maldonado played high school soccer at Hamilton High School, where he was named Hamilton Player of the Year in 2018. Maldonado went on to play a single season of college soccer at Yavapai College, making 14 appearances for the Roughriders, scoring ten goals and tallying seven assists. He earned NJCAA Third-Team All-America, First-Team All-Conference, United Soccer Coaches All-Region and First-Team All-Region honors in his freshman year.

In 2021, Maldonado also played in the NPSL with FC Arizona, scoring two goals in seven appearances.

=== Professional ===
After playing at a player combine in Arizona, Maldonado was signed by new USL Championship club Monterey Bay on February 11, 2022, ahead of their inaugural season. He made his professional debut on March 12, 2022, appearing as an 85th–minute substitute during a 2–4 loss to Phoenix Rising.
