= Sam Gleadle =

English footballer (born 1996)

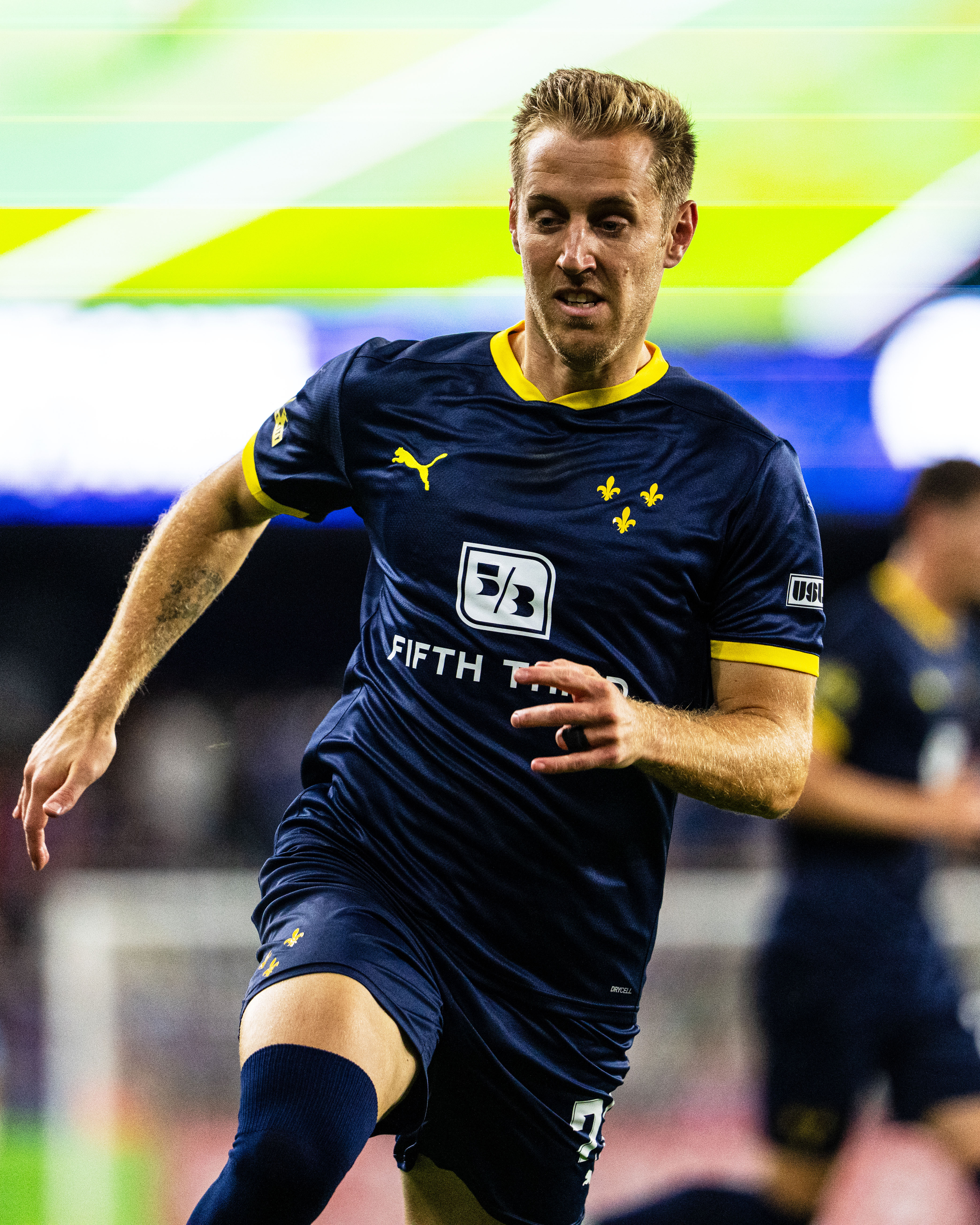
- Gleadle with Louisville City in 2025

Personal information
- Date of birth: 20 March 1996 (age 30)
- Place of birth: Chichester, England
- Height: 1.78 m (5 ft 10 in)
- Position: Winger

Team information
- Current team: Louisville City
- Number: 23

Youth career
- Scottsdale 96 Blackhawks
- 2013: Real Salt Lake

College career
Years	Team	Apps	(Gls)
2014–2017	New Mexico Lobos	70	(5)

Senior career*
Years	Team	Apps	(Gls)
2017	Albuquerque Sol	13	(6)
2018–2020	Reno 1868	43	(7)
2020	Minnesota United	0	(0)
2021	San Antonio FC	22	(0)
2022–2023	Monterey Bay	54	(13)
2024–	Louisville City	59	(5)
- * Club domestic league appearances and goals as of 12:40, 8 November 2026 (UTC)

Sam Gleadle (born 20 March 1996) is an English professional footballer who plays as a winger for USL Championship side Louisville City.

== Early and personal life ==
Born in Chichester, England, Gleadle moved to the United States at the age of nine due to his father's job.

== Career ==
After playing at youth level for Scottsdale 96 Blackhawks and Real Salt Lake, and college soccer with the New Mexico Lobos, Gleadle began his senior career in 2017 with Albuquerque Sol.

=== Reno 1868 ===
Gleadle began his professional career in 2018 with Reno 1868. Gleadle was released by Reno at the end of the 2018 season, having made 1 appearance for the club. However, on 6 February 2019, Gleadle rejoined Reno for the 2019 season, making his USL Championship debut the following month in a 2–2 draw with Orange County.

=== Minnesota United ===
On 30 October 2020, following the USL Championship regular season, Gleadle joined MLS side Minnesota United ahead of their upcoming play-off fixtures. He was released by Minnesota on 11 March 2021, ahead of their 2021 season.

=== San Antonio FC ===
Gleadle signed with USL Championship side San Antonio FC on 6 April 2021.

=== Monterey Bay FC ===
Gleadle signed with USL Championship side Monterey Bay on 23 February 2022, ahead of their inaugural season. Gleadle was included in the starting 11 for Monterey Bay's inaugural match, a 4-2 loss to Phoenix Rising FC. Gleadle scored his first goal for Monterey Bay on 21 May 2022, during a 2-0 victory over Louisville City FC. Gleadle finished the season with eight goals, his highest total in a single season in his career. He shared Monterey Bay's 2022 Golden Boot award with teammate Chase Boone who also finished the season with eight goals. Gleadle was also named the season's Most Valuable Player, as voted by his teammates.

Prior to the 2023 USL Championship season, Gleadle signed a multi-year contract with Monterey Bay FC that would see him stay at the club through at least the 2024 USL Championship season.

=== Louisville City FC ===
In January 2024, Louisville City paid a transfer fee to Monterey Bay to have Gleadle join their club. He scored his first goal for Louisville on 9 June 2024, against North Carolina FC.

== Career statistics ==
As of match played 3 November 2024

Appearances and goals by club, season and competition
Club	Season	League			National Cup		Other		Total	
Club	Season	Division	Apps	Goals	Apps	Goals	Apps	Goals	Apps	Goals
Albuquerque Sol	2017	USL League Two	13	6	0	0	0	0	13	6
Reno 1868	2018	USL Championship	0	0	2	0	0	0	2	0
Reno 1868	2019	USL Championship	27	5	1	0	1	0	29	5
Reno 1868	2020	USL Championship	18	2	0	0	2 (Note: Appearances in USL Championship playoffs)	0	20	2
Reno 1868	Total		43	7	3	0	3	0	49	7
Minnesota United	2020	MLS	0	0	0	0	0	0	0	0
San Antonio	2021	USL Championship	22	0	0	0	3	0	25	0
Monterey Bay	2022	USL Championship	27	8	1	0	0	0	28	8
Monterey Bay	2023	USL Championship	27	5	2	1	0	0	29	6
Monterey Bay	Total		54	13	3	1	0	0	57	14
Louisville City	2024	USL Championship	24	3	2	0	1	0	27	3
Career total			158	29	8	1	7	0	173	30
