= Tristan Trager =

American soccer player (born 1999)

Personal information
- Date of birth: August 28, 1999 (age 27)
- Place of birth: Santa Monica, California, United States
- Height: 5 ft 11 in (1.80 m)
- Positions: Attacking midfielder; forward

Youth career
- 2011–2015: LA Galaxy
- 2015–2018: Strikers FC

College career
Years	Team	Apps	(Gls)
2018–2022	Air Force Falcons	58	(29)

Senior career*
Years	Team	Apps	(Gls)
2022	Atlanta United 2	22	(8)
2023	Charleston Battery	27	(5)
2024	Monterey Bay	20	(8)
2025	Orange County	19	(2)
- * Club domestic league appearances and goals as of October 30, 2025

Tristan Trager (born August 28, 1999) is an American professional soccer player who plays as a forward.

== Career ==
=== Youth and college ===
Trager attended high school at San Clemente High School, whilst also playing club soccer with Strikers FC Academy. In 2018, Trager attended the United States Air Force Academy and was part of the college soccer team. In four seasons with the Falcons, Trager went on to make 58 appearances, scoring 29 goals and tallying eleven assists. He earned honors including First-team All-WAC in 2019, All-WAC Honorable Mention in 2020–21, and was named Offensive Player of the Year for the Western Athletic Conference and First Team All-WAC for the 2021–22 season.

=== Professional ===
On January 11, 2022, Trager was selected 47th overall in the 2022 MLS SuperDraft by Atlanta United. Trager didn't immediately sign with Atlanta, opting instead to see out his senior year with the Air Force. He signed with the club's USL Championship affiliate side Atlanta United 2 on June 1, 2022.

On January 17, 2023, Trager was transferred to USL Championship side Charleston Battery for an undisclosed fee. After one season with Charleston, Trager was acquired by fellow Championship side Monterey Bay FC for an undisclosed fee on January 31, 2024.

Following the 2024 season, Trager entered free agency as his contract with Monterey Bay had ended. On December 17, 2024 Orange County Soccer Club announced the signing of Trager for the 2025 season.

== Personal life ==
Trager was born to an American father and Vietnamese mother.

== Honors ==
Charleston Battery

- Eastern Conference Champion (Playoffs): 2023
