= Sean Okoli =

American soccer player (born 1993)

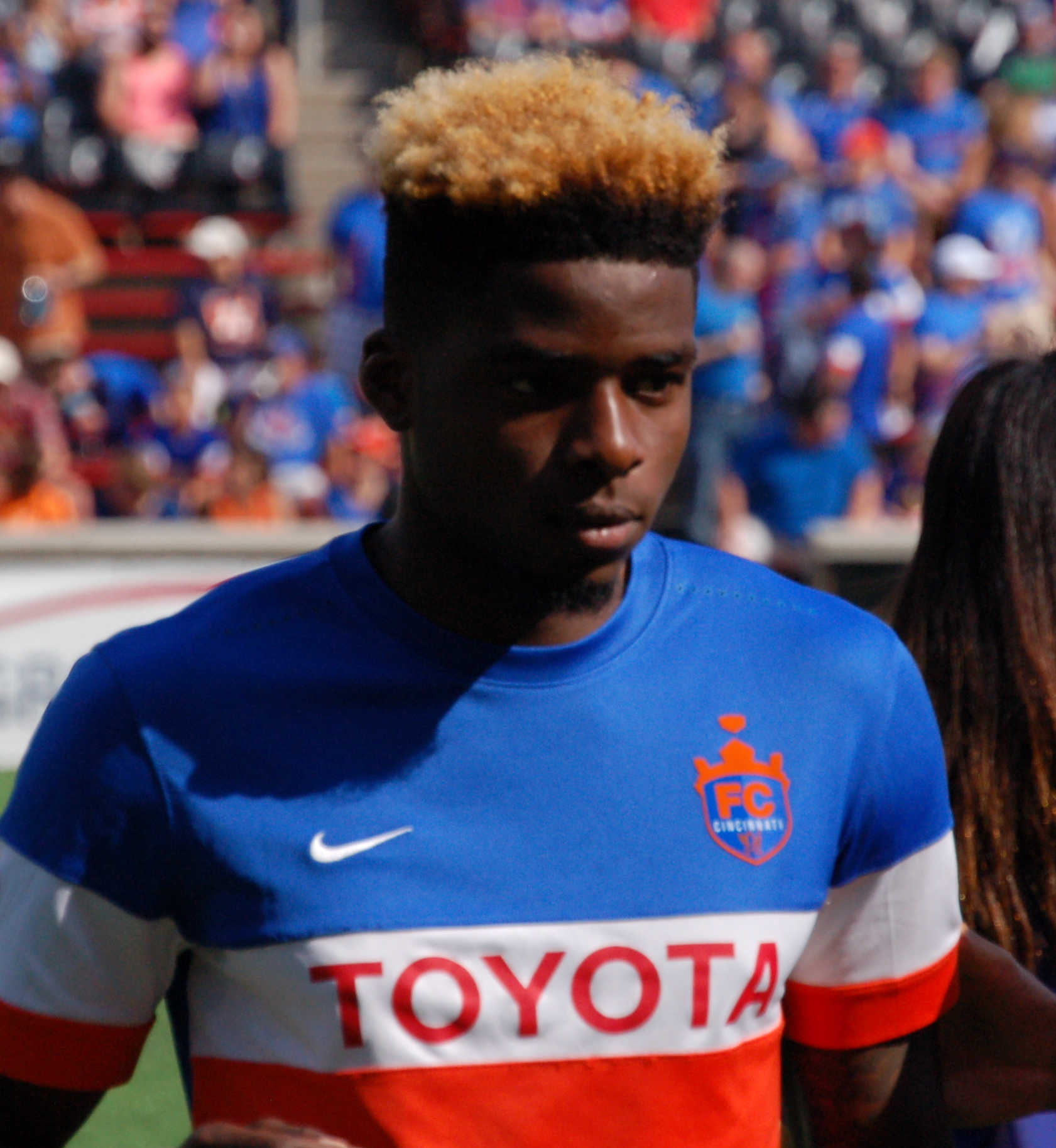
- Okoli playing for FC Cincinnati in 2016

Personal information
- Full name: Sean Ugochukwu Okoli
- Date of birth: February 3, 1993 (age 33)
- Place of birth: Seattle, Washington, United States
- Height: 1.85 m (6 ft 1 in)
- Position: Forward

Youth career
- 2008–2010: Washington Premier FC
- 2010–2011: Seattle Sounders FC

College career
Years	Team	Apps	(Gls)
2011–2013	Wake Forest Demon Deacons	61	(24)

Senior career*
Years	Team	Apps	(Gls)
2012–2013	Seattle Sounders FC U-23	14	(6)
2014	Seattle Sounders FC	3	(0)
2014	→ Orange County Blues (loan)	2	(0)
2015	New England Revolution	5	(0)
2016	FC Cincinnati	29	(16)
2017	New York City FC	16	(1)
2018	Landskrona BoIS	9	(1)
2018	Jerv	12	(1)
2019	Pinzgau Saalfelden	9	(3)
2020	Orange County SC	15	(7)
2021	Austin Bold	11	(3)
2021–2022	Orange County SC	49	(6)
2023	Monterey Bay	21	(3)
Total		195	(47)

International career^{‡}
2010	United States U18	6	(0)
- * Club domestic league appearances and goals as of October 22, 2023 ‡ National team caps and goals as of April 14, 2014

Sean Ugochukwu "Ugo" Okoli (born February 3, 1993) is an American former professional soccer player who played as a forward.

== Career ==
=== Early career ===
Born in Seattle, Washington, Okoli was a part of the Seattle Sounders FC Academy before attending college at Wake Forest University in 2011. While playing for the Demon Deacons Okoli earned All-ACC honors in all three seasons he attended the college and scored 24 goals with 9 assists during his time there. While playing at Wake Forest, Okoli also played in the USL PDL with the Seattle Sounders FC U-23 side in 2012 and 2013. He was also one of the first Academy players to play for the Seattle Sounders reserve side in the MLS Reserve League in 2011.

=== Professional ===
In January 2014, Okoli, along with academy teammate Aaron Kovar, signed a professional contract with Seattle Sounders FC. He made his debut for the Sounders on March 8 in the team's Major League Soccer opener against Sporting Kansas City at CenturyLink Field when he came on in the 86th minute for Lamar Neagle. He then contributed to the teams winning goal in the 93rd minute as they beat Sporting KC 1–0.

In January 2015, the Sounders traded Okoli's rights to New England Revolution in order to trade up in the MLS SuperDraft and select Northwestern goal keeper Tyler Miller.

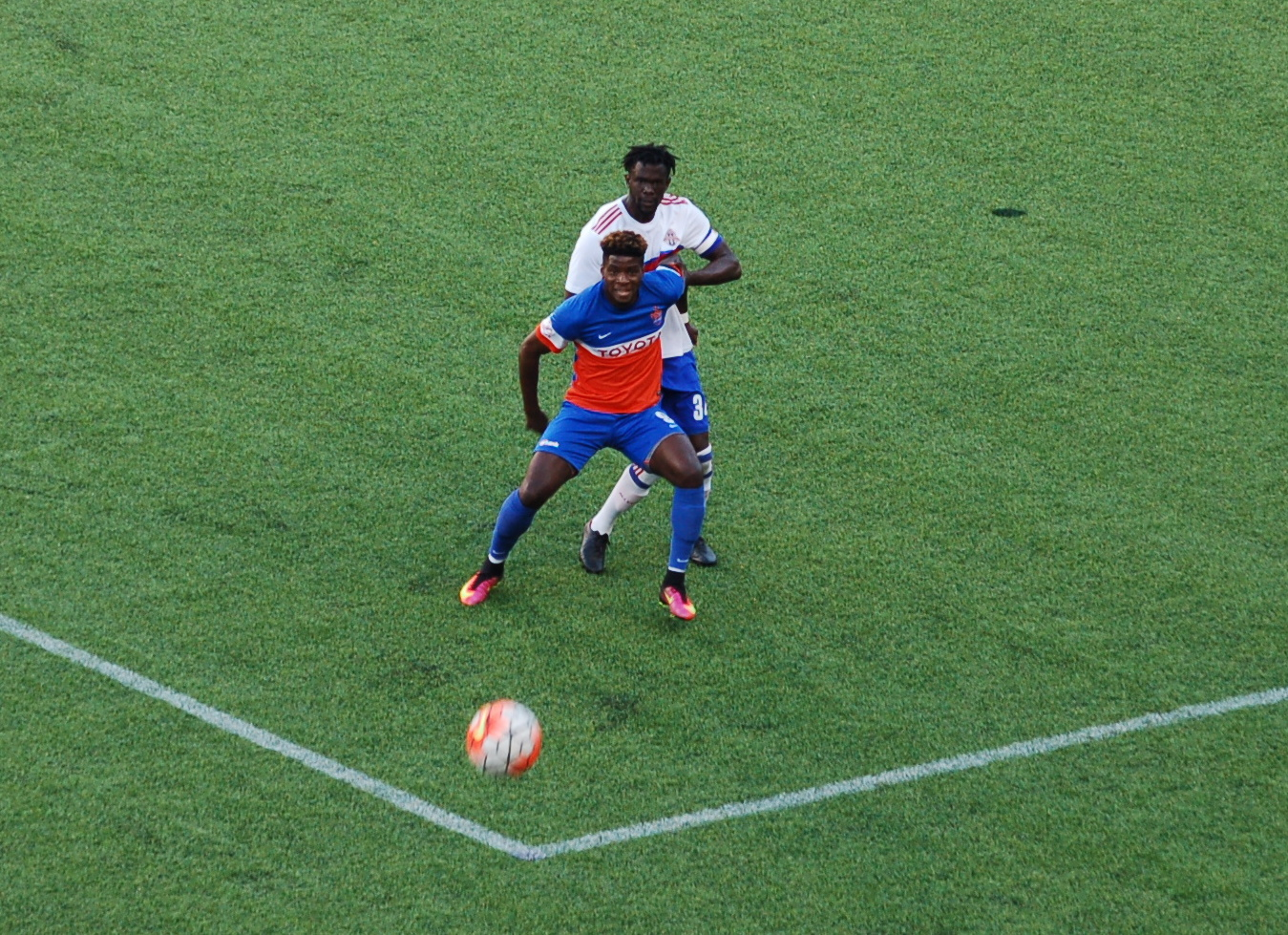
Sean Okoli with FC Cincinnati in 2016

After his release from New England, Okoli signed with United Soccer League side FC Cincinnati for the 2016 season. Okoli led the USL in goals (16) for the 2016 season and was awarded the league's Golden Boot. and Most Valuable Player award.

After spending a season with FC Cincinnati, Okoli moved back to Major League Soccer, signing with New York City FC on December 5, 2016. New York released Okoli at the end of the 2017 season.

Okoli signed with FK Jerv from Norway in August 2018, but left the club again at the end of the year.

In July 2019, Okoli joined Austrian Austrian Regionalliga West side Pinzgau Saalfelden.

Okoli signed with Orange County SC on February 19, 2020.

On February 24, 2021, Okoli joined USL Championship side Austin Bold.

On April 20, 2023, Okoli joined USL Championship side Monterey Bay FC. He left Monterey Bay following their 2023 season.

== Personal life ==
Okoli is of Nigerian descent.

== Career statistics ==
As of 8 October 2017

Club	Season	League			Playoffs		National Cup		Continental		Total	
Club	Season	Division	Apps	Goals	Apps	Goals	Apps	Goals	Apps	Goals	Apps	Goals
Seattle Sounders FC U-23	2012	Premier Development League	10	4	—		—		—		10	4
Seattle Sounders FC U-23	2013	Premier Development League	4	2	—		—		—		4	2
Seattle Sounders FC U-23	U-23 Total		14	6	0	0	0	0	0	0	14	6
Seattle Sounders FC	2014	Major League Soccer	3	0	—		1	1	0	0	4	1
New England Revolution	2015	Major League Soccer	5	0	—		—		—		5	0
FC Cincinnati	2016	USL	29	16	1	0	1	0	—		31	16
New York City FC	2017	Major League Soccer	16	1	0	0	1	0	—		17	1
Career total			67	23	0	0	2	1	0	0	71	24

== Honors ==
Individual

- USL League MVP: 2016
- USL All-League Team: 2016
