= Walmer Martínez =

Salvadoran footballer (born 1998)

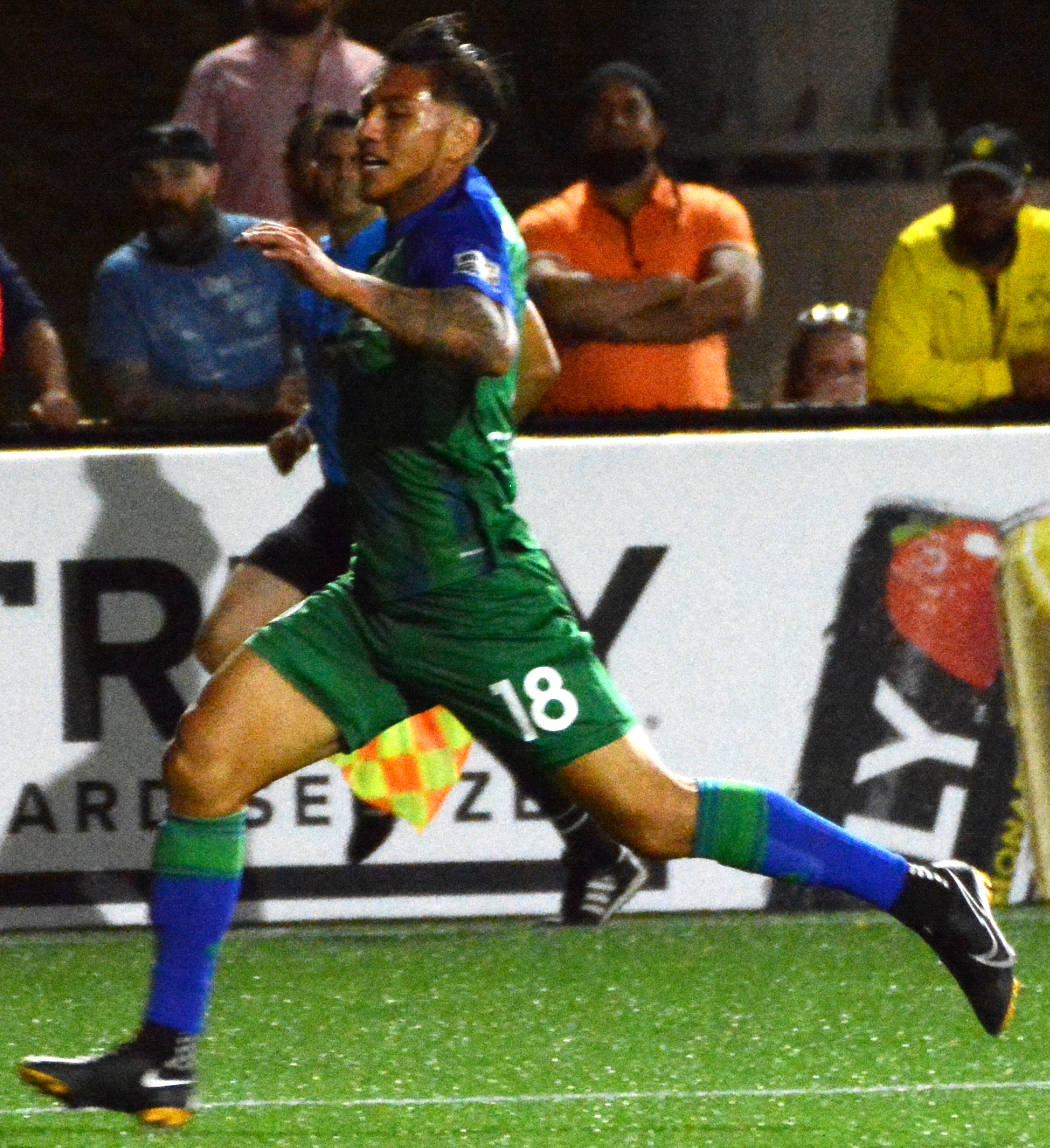
- Martínez with Hartford Athletic in 2021

Personal information
- Full name: Walmer Osmar Gómez Martínez
- Date of birth: 17 August 1998 (age 28)
- Place of birth: Santa Cruz, California, United States
- Height: 5 ft 10 in (1.78 m)
- Positions: Full-back; winger; forward

College career
Years	Team	Apps	(Gls)
2016–2017	Cabrillo Seahawks	35	(22)
2018–2019	Cal State Monterey Bay Otters	35	(17)

Senior career*
Years	Team	Apps	(Gls)
2018–2019	Santa Cruz Breakers	24	(10)
2019	Des Moines Menace	2	(0)
2020	Project 51O	1	(0)
2021	Hartford Athletic	19	(2)
2022–2024	Monterey Bay	83	(2)
2025	AV Alta FC	26	(4)

International career^{‡}
2021–2023	El Salvador	18	(2)
- * Club domestic league appearances and goals as of 13:00, 1 November 2025 (UTC) ‡ National team caps and goals as of 15:58, 5 April 2022 (UTC)

Walmer Osmar Gómez Martínez (born 17 August 1998) is a professional footballer who most recently played for USL League One side AV Alta FC. Born in the United States, he has played for the El Salvador national team.

== Early life ==
Martínez was born in Santa Cruz, California to a Honduran father and his mother Lucila who was from Victoria, Cabañas, El Salvador. Walmer played for the Santa Cruz Breakers academy during his youth soccer and high school career. He attended Cypress Charter School from 2012 to 2013 where he played soccer as a freshman before attending Soquel High School, though he did not play high school soccer while attending the latter school.

== Club career ==
=== Youth and college ===
Martínez attended Cabrillo College in 2016, playing two seasons with the Seahawks, scoring 22 goals in 35 appearances. In 2018, Martínez transferred to California State University, Monterey Bay where he scored 17 goals in 35 appearances.

While at college, Martínez appeared for USL League Two side Santa Cruz Breakers in both 2018 and 2019. He also appeared for Des Moines Menace towards the end of their 2019 season.

=== Professional ===
Martínez signed with USL Championship side Hartford Athletic on April 12, 2021, after attending Hartford's Invitational Combine. Martínez scored his first professional goals on October 26, 2021, when he scored a brace in Hartfrd's 2–0 win over the Charleston Battery.

On 22 December 2021, Martínez was announced as the first-ever signing by USL Championship expansion club Monterey Bay FC. Following the 2024 season, Monterey declined to pick up his contract option and he became a free agent.

On 7 February 2025, Martínez joined USL League One side AV Alta FC ahead of their inaugural season.

== International career ==
Coach Hugo Pérez had approached Martínez about playing for the El Salvador under-23 for the 2020 CONCACAF Men's Olympic Qualifying Championship in March 2021, but he was unable to obtain a passport in time.

Martínez debuted with the El Salvador national football team in a 7–0 2022 FIFA World Cup qualification win over United States Virgin Islands on 5 June 2021 when he came on as a substitute.

Martínez scored his first goal for El Salvador on June 8, 2021, in the team's 3–0 win over Antigua and Barbuda.

List of international goals scored by Walmer Martínez
No.	Date	Venue	Opponent	Score	Result	Competition
1	8 June 2021	Estadio Cuscatlán, San Salvador,El Salvador	Antigua and Barbuda	3–0	3–0	2022 FIFA World Cup qualification
2	July 14, 2021	Toyota Stadium, Frisco, United States	Trinidad and Tobago	2–0	2–0	2021 CONCACAF Gold Cup
