= Xavi Gnaulati =

American soccer player (born 2005)

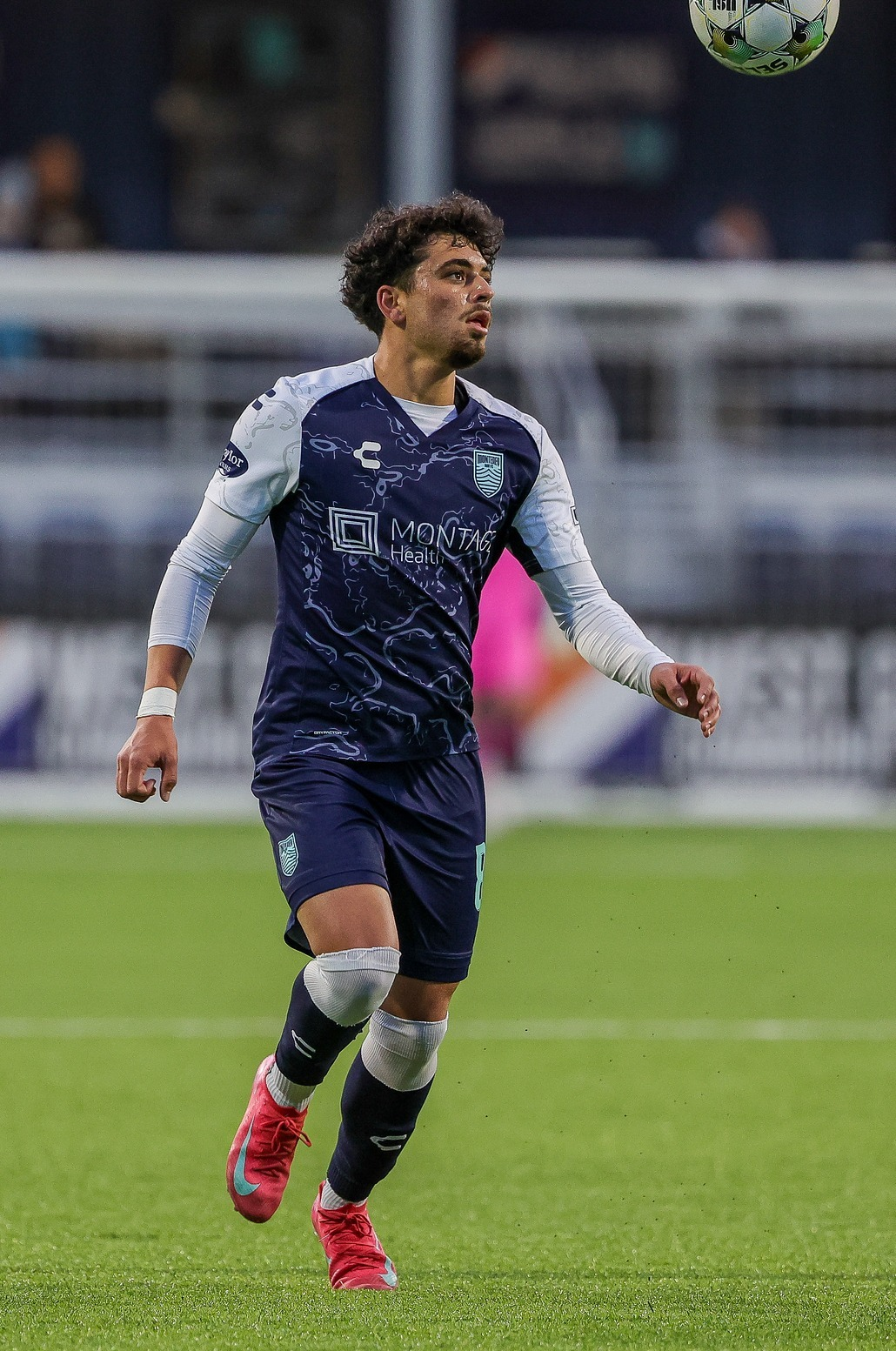
- Gnaulati with Monterey Bay in April 2025

Personal information
- Full name: Xavi Milad Gnaulati
- Date of birth: January 22, 2005 (age 21)
- Place of birth: San Diego, California, United States
- Height: 1.75 m (5 ft 9 in)
- Position: Central midfielder

Team information
- Current team: Tacoma Defiance
- Number: 32

Youth career
- 2010–2023: San Diego Surf

Senior career*
Years	Team	Apps	(Gls)
2021–2023	San Diego Loyal	6	(2)
2024–2025	Monterey Bay	41	(2)
2026–	Tacoma Defiance	0	(0)
- * Club domestic league appearances and goals as of October 29, 2025

Xavi Milad Gnaulati (born January 22, 2005) is an American soccer player who plays as a midfielder for Tacoma Defiance.

== Early career ==
Xavi Gnaulati was born and raised in San Diego County, California, playing youth soccer for San Diego Surf and winning the State Cup Championship with them in 2014. On July 1, 2023, Gnaulati scored in the final to help Surf win the ECNL National Championship.

== Club career ==
=== San Diego Loyal ===
In April 2021, Gnaulati joined San Diego Loyal in the USL Championship and their inaugural USL Academy team, Loyal Select. He first played for the club in a training match against MLS side LA Galaxy in March 2021 and made his public debut as a substitute in a friendly match against Liga MX side Club Tijuana on July 10.

Gnaulati made his professional debut for San Diego Loyal on April 6, 2022, during the 2022 season, at the age of 17 under manager Landon Donovan in the Loyal's inaugural U.S. Open Cup match against NISA side Albion San Diego, starting the match and playing 79 minutes before being substituted for Alejandro Guido in a 2–1 win.

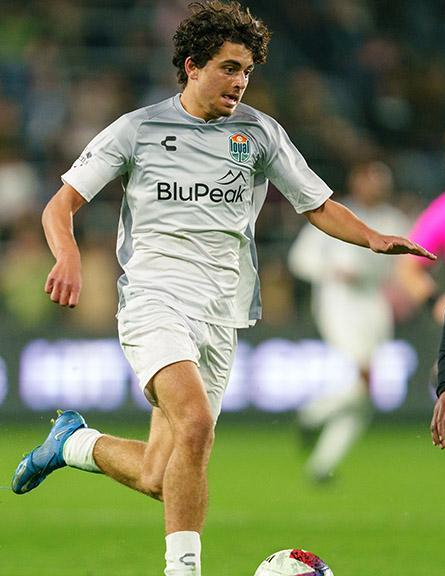
Gnaulati with the San Diego Loyal in February 2023

Gnaulati made his first appearance of the 2023 season in his following competitive match for the club, winning a penalty as well as providing a secondary assist for a 2–0 win during their 2023 U.S. Open Cup opener against Albion San Diego on April 5, 2023. Following a substitute appearance in a friendly match against German Bundesliga side Borussia Dortmund on July 27, Gnaulati signed his first professional contract with San Diego Loyal the following day on July 28.

Gnaulati was given his USL Championship debut on August 9, 2023, at the age of 18 against Loudoun United at Torero Stadium during the 2023 season.

Gnaulati scored his first professional goal on September 20, scoring a brace in the 90th and 90+3rd minute of a league game in a 3–2 comeback win against Monterey Bay FC at Cardinale Stadium. He was subsequently named in the Team of the Week for his performance.

=== Monterey Bay ===
Gnaulati became a free agent following the folding of San Diego Loyal after the 2023 USL Championship season. He joined Monterey Bay FC on December 6, 2023, on a one-year contract, with an option for a second year, ahead of the 2024 USL Championship season. He scored his first league goal for the club on October 10, 2024 against Sacramento Republic, winning the league's Goal of the Week award for his long-range strike. After an impressive impact in his first season, Gnaulati's contract was extended ahead of the following 2025 season. He scored his first goal of the 2025 season on March 19, 2025, scoring a brace in the U.S. Open Cup against San Francisco Soccer Football League side International San Francisco. In the following U.S. Open Cup match, he scored a goal against NPSL side El Farolito on April 1, 2025, bringing his tally to three goals in two cup matches for the season, and becoming joint top scorer of the 2025 U.S. Open Cup.

=== Tacoma Defiance and Seattle Sounders ===
Gnaulati was transferred from Monterey Bay to MLS Next Pro club Tacoma Defiance, the reserve side of MLS club Seattle Sounders, on January 9, 2026 ahead of the 2026 season, for a "significant fee with future incentives." He scored his first league goal for Tacoma Defiance on July 12, 2026 against San Jose Earthquakes II. Gnaulati was named to his first matchday squad of parent club Seattle Sounders on August 12, 2026 for a Leagues Cup match against Liga MX side Chivas de Guadalajara, and was named to his first MLS matchday squad in the following match on August 16 against Cascadian rivals Vancouver Whitecaps, remaining an unused substitute in both matches.

== International career ==
=== Youth ===
In January 2019, Gnaulati was called up for the United States under-14 camp in Carson, California. He was called up again for a United States youth team camp in May 2021.

== Career statistics ==
As of October 23, 2023

Club	Division	Season	League		Cup		Other		Total	
Club	Division	Season	Apps	Goals	Apps	Goals	Apps	Goals	Apps	Goals
San Diego Loyal SC	USL Championship	2021	0	0	—		0	0	0	0
San Diego Loyal SC	USL Championship	2022	0	0	1	0	0	0	1	0
San Diego Loyal SC	USL Championship	2023	6	2	2	0	0	0	8	2
Career total			6	2	3	0	0	0	9	2

== Honours ==
San Diego Surf

- Elite Clubs National League: 2023
