= Alex Lara =

American soccer player

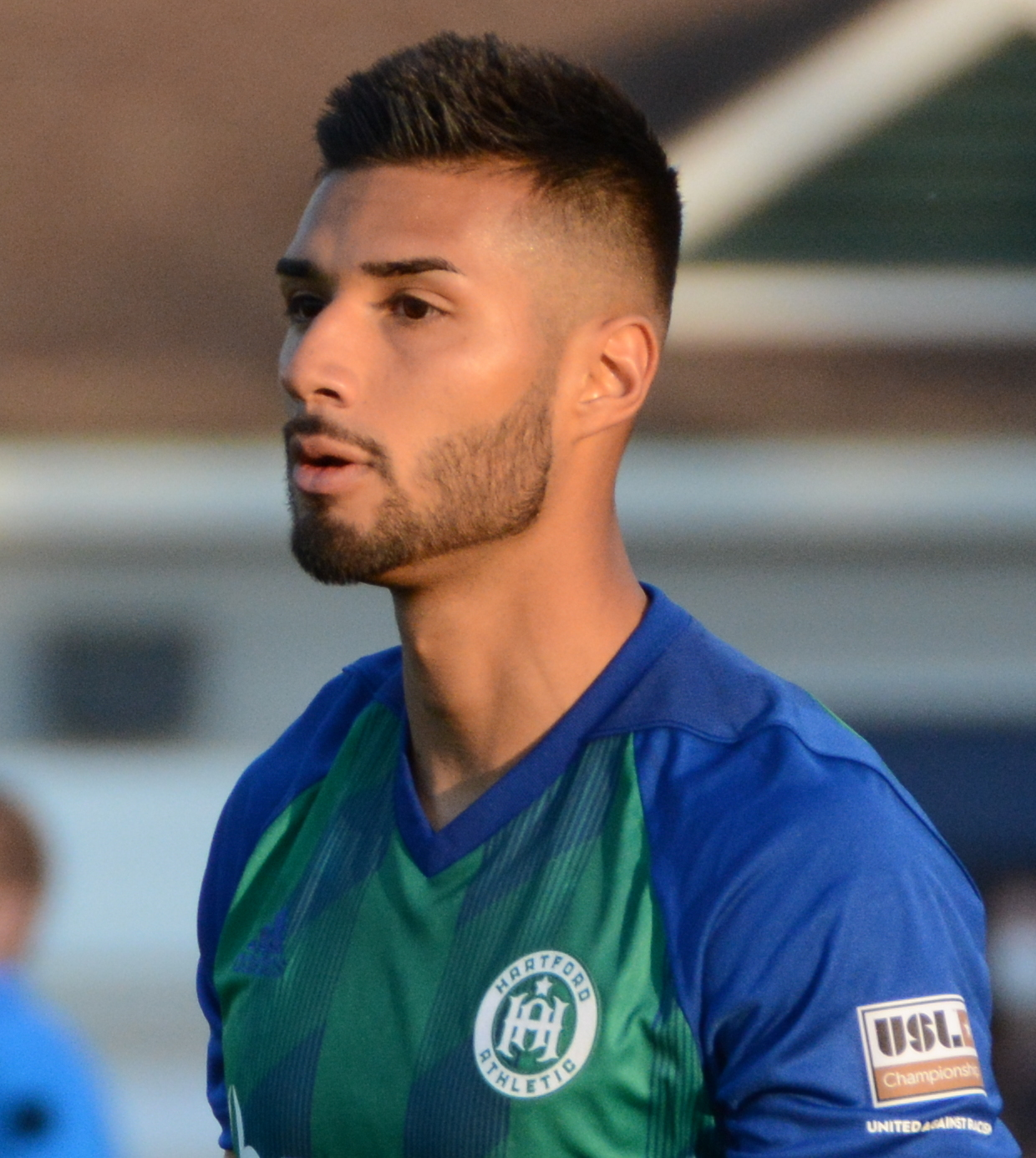
- Lara with Hartford Athletic in 2021

Personal information
- Full name: Alejandro Lara
- Date of birth: September 15, 1998 (age 28)
- Place of birth: Azusa, California, United States
- Height: 6 ft 1 in (1.85 m)
- Position: Defender

Youth career
- 2015–2016: Arsenal FC (California)

College career
Years	Team	Apps	(Gls)
2016	Mt. SAC Mounties	20	(0)
2017–2019	Cal State Northridge Matadors	53	(2)

Senior career*
Years	Team	Apps	(Gls)
2017	Weston FC	3	(0)
2019	Ventura County Fusion	9	(1)
2020–2021	Hartford Athletic	28	(2)
2022	Las Vegas Lights	33	(1)
2023–2025	Monterey Bay FC	55	(3)
- * Club domestic league appearances and goals as of October 29, 2025

Alejandro "Alex" Lara (born September 15, 1998) is an American professional soccer player who plays as a defender.

== Career ==
=== Youth, college and amateur ===
Lara played one season with USSDA side Arsenal in 2015–2016, before playing college soccer at Mt. San Antonio College. After one season at Mt. SAC, Lara transferred to California State University, Northridge, where he played three more seasons. During his time with the Matadors, Lara made 53 appearances, scoring 2 goals and tallying 2 assists.

While at college, Lara also appeared in the USL League Two for both Weston FC in 2017, and Ventura County Fusion during their 2019 season.

=== Professional ===
On December 13, 2019, Lara signed his professional contract with USL Championship side Hartford Athletic. He made his debut on July 17, 2020, appearing as an injury time substitute during a 1–0 win over New York Red Bulls II. On September 30, Lara scored his first professional goal in Hartford's 3–2 win over Philadelphia Union II. Lara finished the 2020 season fourth on the team in blocks (4), clearances (33), interceptions (23) and tackles won (13) in 13 games played. He re signed with Hartford for the 2021 season in December 2020. On March 3, 2022, Lara signed with USL Championship side Las Vegas Lights.

Lara joined Monterey Bay FC on December 27, 2022. After three seasons with the club, Lara departed the club to free agency following the 2025 season.
