= Chase Boone =

American soccer player (born 1995)

Personal information
- Full name: Chase Andrew Boone
- Date of birth: September 21, 1995 (age 31)
- Place of birth: Beaverton, Oregon, United States
- Height: 1.88 m (6 ft 2 in)
- Positions: Forward; winger

Youth career
- Westside Metros

College career
Years	Team	Apps	(Gls)
2014–2017	Redlands Bulldogs	88	(34)

Senior career*
Years	Team	Apps	(Gls)
2017	Portland Timbers U23	2	(0)
2019–2020	Thisted	2	(0)
2021	San Diego Loyal	8	(0)
2022–2024	Monterey Bay	64	(10)
2025	Pittsburgh Riverhounds	8	(1)
- * Club domestic league appearances and goals as of October 25, 2025

Chase Andrew Boone (born September 21, 1995) is an American soccer player who played as a forward for USL Championship club Pittsburgh Riverhounds.

== Career ==
=== College & PDL ===
Boone attended the University of Redlands to play college soccer. Over four seasons with the Bulldogs, Boone made 88 appearances, scoring 34 goals and tallying 25 assists. He also earned accolades including been named to the NSCAA All-West Region Team, All-SCIAC First-Team honors on consecutive occasions, and was named on the SCIAC All-Academic Men's Soccer Team.

During the 2017 season, Boone also appeared for USL PDL side Portland Timbers U23, making two appearances for the club.

=== Professional ===
In 2019 Boone signed with third-tier Danish 2nd Division side Thisted, where he played for two seasons.

On July 24, 2021, it was announced Boone had returned to the United States and signed for USL Championship side San Diego Loyal. He made his debut the same day, appearing as a 70th-minute substitute during a 1–0 loss to Phoenix Rising.

On January 27, 2022, Boone was announced as the third player to sign for USL Championship expansion side Monterey Bay FC. Boone was included in the starting 11 for Monterey Bay's inaugural match, a 4–2 loss to Phoenix Rising FC. Boone scored his first and second goals for the club during the first win in Monterey Bay FC history, a 3–2 victory over Oakland Roots SC. Boone finished the season with eight goals, tied for Monterey Bay's golden boot with teammate Sam Gleadle. Prior to the 2023 season, Boone's contract with Monterey Bay was extended through the 2024 USL Championship season. Following the 2024 season, Monterey declined to pick up his contract option and he became a free agent.

On August 14, 2025, Boone signed with USL Championship club Pittsburgh Riverhounds for the remainder of the season.
