= Carlos Herrera (footballer, born 1997) =

Mexican footballer (born 1997)

Personal information
- Full name: Carlos Eduardo Herrera Lepe
- Date of birth: 12 September 1997 (age 29)
- Place of birth: Mexico City, Mexico
- Height: 6 ft 1 in (1.85 m)
- Position: Goalkeeper

Team information
- Current team: Detroit City
- Number: 21

College career
Years	Team	Apps	(Gls)
2016–2017	Iowa Western Reivers		(0)
2017–2018	Texas A&M International Dustdevils	32	(0)

Senior career*
Years	Team	Apps	(Gls)
2017	Little Rock Rangers		
2018–2019	Laredo Heat		
2020–2021	Contra Costa FC		
2022–2024	Monterey Bay	34	(0)
2025–	Detroit City	43	(0)
- * Club domestic league appearances and goals as of November 4, 2026

Carlos Eduardo Herrera Lepe (born 12 September 1997) is a Mexican professional footballer who plays as a goalkeeper for Detroit City in the USL Championship.

== Career ==
=== College career ===
Herrera started his college career at Iowa Western Community College, transferring after two years to Texas A&M International University.

While in college Herrera played for NPSL clubs Little Rock Rangers and Laredo Heat.

=== Monterey Bay ===
Seeking his first professional contract, Herrera trialed with Monterey Bay before the start of their inaugural season, but ultimately wasn't signed. However, after Union goalkeeper Rafael Díaz suffered an injury, Monterey Bay signed Herrera to a 25-day contract on 14 April 2022. His contract was extended through the remainder of the season on 6 May 2022. The very next day Herrera would make his first professional appearance, starting in the club's first-ever home match on 7 May 2022. Herrera would lead the team to a 1–0 win over Las Vegas Lights, Monterey Bay's first shutout in club history. In the spring of 2023 Herrera became an assistant coach for Monterey Bay's pre-professional side Monterey Bay F.C. 2, which plays in USL League Two. Following the 2024 season, Monterey declined to pick up his contract option and he became a free agent.

=== Detroit CIty ===
Herrera signed a two-year deal with Detroit City FC ahead of their upcoming 2025 season.

Following the 2026 season, Herrera was honored with the USL Championship Golden Glove award. In 27 regular season matches he recorded 14 clean sheet with 55 saves resulting in a 0.65 goals-against average.

== Honors ==
Individual

- USL Championship Golden Glove award: 2026
