= Kai Greene (soccer) =

American soccer player (born 1993)

Personal information
- Date of birth: July 7, 1993 (age 33)
- Place of birth: Jersey City, New Jersey, United States
- Height: 1.80 m (5 ft 11 in)
- Position: Right back

College career
Years	Team	Apps	(Gls)
2011–2014	Seton Hall Pirates	68	(9)

Senior career*
Years	Team	Apps	(Gls)
2016–2018	Rio Grande Valley FC	68	(1)
2019–2020	San Antonio FC	42	(0)
2021–2022	Oakland Roots	28	(1)
2022–2024	Monterey Bay	97	(0)
2025	Oakland Roots	25	(1)
- * Club domestic league appearances and goals as of October 30, 2025

Kai Greene (born July 7, 1993) is an American soccer player.

== Career ==
=== Youth and college ===
Raised in South Orange, New Jersey, Greene played soccer at Columbia High School.

Greene played four years of college soccer at the Seton Hall University between 2011 and 2014, originally as a midfielder before transitioning to a defender.

=== Professional ===
In 2015, Greene trained in Germany with Borussia Neunkirchen and SV Elversberg, before signing with United Soccer League side Rio Grande Valley FC on March 16, 2016.

On December 6, 2018, Greene joined San Antonio FC ahead of the 2019 USL Championship season.

On May 31, 2021, Green signed with USL Championship side Oakland Roots.

On February 14, 2022, Greene was transferred to USL Championship side Monterey Bay ahead of their inaugural season. Greene was included in the starting 11 for Monterey Bay's inaugural match, a 4–2 loss to Phoenix Rising FC. At the conclusion of the 2022 season Greene was named Defensive Player of the Year, an award voted on by his teammates. Prior to the 2023 season Greene signed a new two-year contract with Monterey Bay.

Greene returned to Oakland Roots in November 2024, ahead of the 2025 USL Championship season. He left Oakland following their 2025 season.
