= Cal State Monterey Bay Otters =

- University: California State University, Monterey Bay
- NCAA: Division II
- Conference: CCAA (primary); WWPA (women's water polo)
- Athletic director: Kirby Garry
- Location: Seaside, California
- First season: 1996
- Varsity teams: 14 (6 men's, 8 women's)
- Basketball arena: The Kelp Bed
- Baseball stadium: CSUMB Baseball Field
- Softball stadium: CSUMB Softball Field
- Soccer stadium: Cardinale Stadium
- Aquatics center: CSUMB Aquatic Center
- Nickname: Otters
- Colors: Blue and gold
- Mascot: Monte Rey Otter
- Website: otterathletics.com
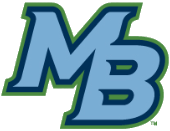

Team NCAA championships
- 1

The Cal State Monterey Bay Otters (or CSUMB Otters) are the athletic teams that represent California State University, Monterey Bay, located in Monterey County, California, in intercollegiate sports as a member of the Division II level of the National Collegiate Athletic Association (NCAA), primarily competing in the California Collegiate Athletic Association (CCAA) for most of its sports since the 2004–05 academic year; while its women's water polo teams compete in the Western Water Polo Association (WWPA). The Otters previously competed in the California Pacific Conference (CalPac) of the National Association of Intercollegiate Athletics (NAIA) from 1996–97 to 2003–04.

== Facilities ==
The Otter Sports Center is the home to the Otters Men's and Women's Basketball and Women's Volleyball teams. The gymnasium inside the Otter Sports Center is affectionately known as The Kelp Bed, in reference the floating home of the sea otter. The men's and women's soccer teams began playing at Cardinale Stadium in 2022. The stadium was built in partnership with Monterey Bay FC, a professional 2nd division soccer club playing in the USL Championship.

== History ==
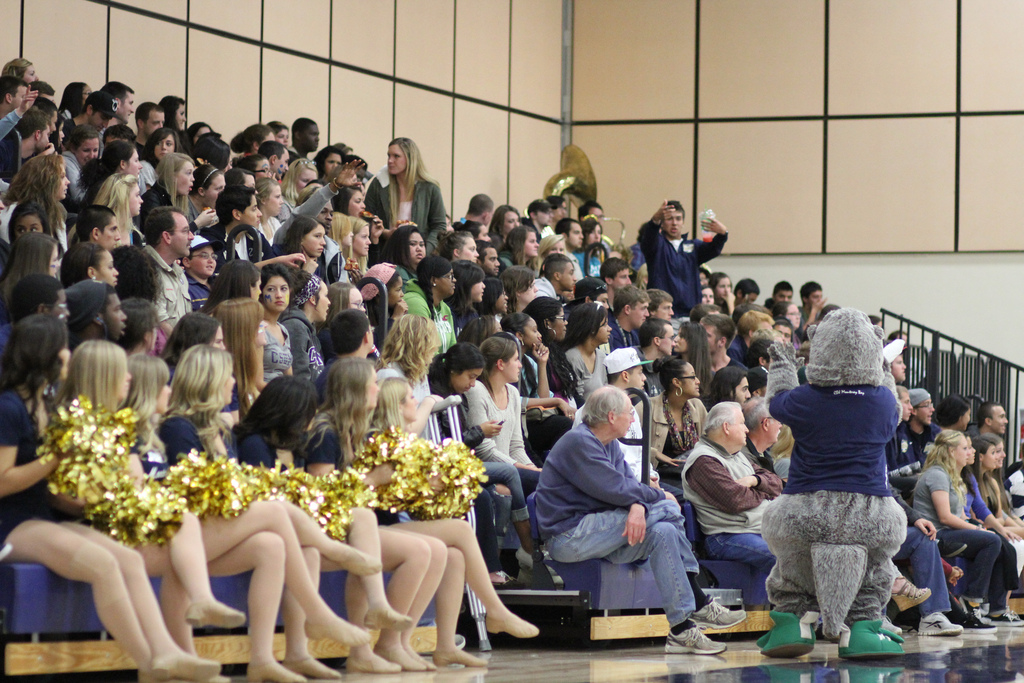
Monte Rey pumps up the crowd at The Kelp Bed

The CSUMB Otters began intercollegiate competition in 1996, with all sports competing in the National Association of Intercollegiate Athletics (NAIA) as part of the California Pacific Conference. Their first ever event was on September 12, 11996, when the Otters women's volleyball team beat Life Bible College. In 2003, the Otters made the transition to the NCAA Division II ranks, joining the CCAA as a provisional member in 2004.

After two years of probationary status, the Otters became full-fledged members of the NCAA and the CCAA in 2005. In their first five years of competition the Otters earned four conference titles and one national championship in Men's Golf (2011).

=== Conference affiliations ===
- 1996–97 to 2002–03 – California Pacific Conference – NAIA
- 2003–04 – California Pacific Conference – NAIA; Division II Independent – NCAA
- 2004–05 to present – California Collegiate Athletic Association – NCAA

== Varsity teams ==
CSUMB competes in 14 intercollegiate varsity sports: Men's sports include baseball, basketball, cross country, golf, soccer, and track & field; while women's sports include basketball, cross country, golf, soccer, softball, track & field (indoor and outdoor), volleyball and water polo.

CSUMB also has a coed sailing team which competes in the fall and spring (although the spring season is more important). The sailing team competes in the Pacific Coast Collegiate Sailing Conference (PCCSC).

Men's sports	Women's sports
Baseball	Basketball
Basketball	Cross country
Cross country	Golf
Golf	Soccer
Soccer	Softball
Track and field	Track and field^{1}
	Volleyball
	Water polo
^{1} – includes both indoor and outdoor

== Championships ==
=== Appearances ===
The CSU Monterey Bay Otters competed in the NCAA Tournament across 6 sports (3 men's and 3 women's) 31 times at the Division II level.

- Baseball (9): 2013, 2016, 2018, 2019, 2021, 2022, 2023, 2024, 2025, 2026
- Women's basketball (3): 2011, 2012, 2013
- Men's golf (7): 2010, 2011, 2013, 2014, 2015, 2017, 2019, 2023
- Women's golf (1): 2010
- Men's soccer (1): 2023
- Softball (9): 2008, 2009, 2010, 2012, 2014, 2015, 2017, 2022, 2026

=== Team ===
The Otters of CSU Monterey Bay earned 1 NCAA team championship at the Division II Level.

- Men's (1)
  - Golf: 2011

Results

School year	Sport	Opponent	Score
2010–11	Men's golf	Lynn	3–2

Below are three national club team championships:

- Women's disc golf (3): 2015, 2016, 2017
