= Monterey Bay FC =

American professional soccer team

- Full name: Monterey Bay Football Club
- Nicknames: Union, Crisp and Kelp
- Founded: February 1, 2021; 5 years ago
- Stadium: Cardinale Stadium; Seaside, California
- Capacity: 6,000
- Owner: Ray Beshoff
- President: Mike DiGiulio
- Head Coach: Alex Covelo
- League: USL Championship
- 2025: 11th, Western Conference; Playoffs: DNQ
- Website: montereybayfc.com
Home colors	Away colors

Monterey Bay Football Club is an American professional soccer team based in Monterey County, California. The club was established on February 21, 2021, and is a member of the USL Championship, the second tier of the American soccer league system. It began playing during the 2022 USL Championship season as a member of the league's Western Conference. The club established the Monterey Bay Sirens, an amateur women's team in the USL W League, ahead of the 2026 season.

== History ==
=== Former Monterey Bay teams ===
The Monterey Bay area had its first professional team in 1993 when Santa Cruz Surf joined the USISL. The team would only last through the 1994 season, but professional soccer's absence would not last long as the Monterey Bay Jaguars were established for the 1995 season. The following season the Jaguars would change the location in their name to "California" and have their most successful season, defeating the Richmond Kickers 2-1 to win the USISL Select League Championship. The Jaguars would continue to play in USL affiliated leagues until their folding after the 1999 USL D3 Pro League season.

National club soccer would not return to the Monterey Bay until 2004, when the Salinas Valley Samba joined the Men's Premier Soccer League for its second season. The 2007 NPSL season would see two Monterey Bay teams playing in the same league, with the Santa Cruz County Breakers established. However this would not last long, as the Breakers would fold their NPSL club in 2008. The Samba themselves would fold the following year, with the 2009 season being their last. In 2018, a decade after the initial Breakers team folded, the club reestablished their first-team side and joined the USL PDL under the name Santa Cruz Breakers FC. They would play only one more season in the rebranded USL League Two, which would end up as their last. After the onset of the COVID-19 pandemic, the USL canceled the 2020 USL League Two season and the next year the Southwest division did not return to play. The Breakers did not return to play in 2022, ending their USL tenure.

=== From Fresno to the Monterey Bay ===
Monterey Bay F.C. is a continuation of the USL Championship's former Fresno FC franchise. The team, owned by Ray Beshoff, ceased operations after the 2019 season because he was unable to secure construction of a soccer-specific stadium. Beshoff retained franchise rights and sought another place in California to relocate. On February 1, 2021, Monterey Bay F.C. joined the USL Championship, playing in the league's Western Conference. The club's Sporting Director is two-time MLS Coach of the Year, Frank Yallop. Yallop had previously served as general manager of Fresno FC. In April 2021, former San Jose Earthquakes captain, Ramiro Corrales, joined the team staff as a technical advisor. Corrales, a native of Salinas, began and ended his playing career in the Monterey Bay Area. His career began with the Monterey Bay Jaguars in 1995 before joining the San Jose Clash (later renamed "Earthquakes") in 1996. He last served as a player-coach with Santa Cruz Breakers during the 2018 USL PDL season. General manager Frank Yallop was also named head coach on April 22, 2021, with Ramiro Corrales as assistant coach.

=== First USL Championship seasons ===
The club announced their first signing, Walmer Martinez, on December 22, 2021. Born in Santa Cruz, Martinez had previously played with fellow USL Championship side Hartford Athletic but was brought in by Monterey Bay, through a transfer for an undisclosed fee, to play professionally at the same campus he had featured collegiately with California State University Monterey Bay. The club's ever first match was a pre-season encounter away to MLS club San Jose Earthquakes. Monterey Bay ended up losing the encounter 4–2. The club's final signing before the season started was another local product and CSUMB alum, Adrian Rebollar. Rebollar, a native of Watsonville, was a trialist during the preseason and made it to the first team. Due to the timing of the renovation of Cardinale Stadium, the team started the regular season with seven consecutive league road matches. The club's first ever professional win occurred on March 26, 2022, in their third ever match, away to nearby Northern California side Oakland Roots SC. Club captain Hugh Roberts scored the winning goal of the 2–3 victory in the final minute of regulation. Another away match was added to their schedule for their US Open Cup debut, an away match against NISA club Bay Cities FC. Monterey Bay ultimately suffered an upset, losing 2–1 against the 3rd division side. The club had their first ever home match on May 7, 2022, defeating Las Vegas Lights FC 1–0 on a goal by Walmer Martinez in the 56th minute. After a late playoff push, the Union ultimately finished their inaugural season in 12th place, second to last in the Western Conference and seven points away from qualifying for the playoffs.

In preparation for their second season, Monterey Bay brought back 17 players from their inaugural squad. Newcomer Alex Dixon scored the club's first ever hat trick in the 2023 USL Championship season opener against Hartford Athletic. The hat trick's first goal featured the fastest goal in club history (91 seconds) and the third goal was the first penalty scored by the club. His performance also earned him USL Championship Player of the Week honors, another first for a player from the club. The club won their first ever U.S. Open Cup match on April 5, 2023, away to Central Valley Fuego FC, the club which filled the professional soccer void in Fresno after Fresno FC folded to eventually become Monterey Bay FC itself. In the following round Monterey Bay achieved their most important win in club history, upsetting local MLS club San Jose Earthquakes 1–0. It was their first competitive match against a first division club in their history. The club would once again host MLS competition in the US Open Cup, but this time they fell in a penalty-shootout against Los Angeles FC. The match against LAFC featured the club's highest ever attendance, just shy of a sellout with 5,808 fans on hand. Despite a hot start to the season, Monterey Bay would ultimately finish the season in 11th place, once again 2nd to last in the Western Conference and six points away from qualifying for the playoffs.

Following the 2023 season, Monterey Bay FC Principal Owner Ray Beshoff stated that the club's goals for the offseason were to broaden their developmental side Monterey Bay FC 2 into a year-round program as well as to expand their academy's development to reach more youth in the community. The club announced their initial roster decisions ahead of the 2024 season on November 28, 2023. The most notable departures were the club's first captain Hugh Roberts as well as the club's all-time leading goal scorer Christian Volesky. The club announced a U-18 Development Academy on February 5, 2024. The program would identify young talent in the Monterey, Santa Cruz, and San Benito tri-county area and allow them to train at the club's facilities and with their staff throughout the year. Three Monterey Bay FC 2 players were added to the roster ahead of the 2024 USL Championship season: Pierce Gallaway, Miguel Guerrero, and Anthony Orendain. In March 2025 the club revealed that if they were able to make proposed upgrades to Cardinale Stadium and its facilities, they would have the ability to host a women's team in one or both of the professional USL Super League or USL W League.

The team finished the 2025 season in 11th place for the third consecutive season, and second to last for the fourth season in its four year history. The lack of playoff qualification saw the club give season ticket holders a 20-percent refund, based on a guarantee the club had given entering into the season. On September 18, 2025, club president Mike DiGuilo announced he would resign at the conclusion of the regular season. The following day, Mike Sheehan was announced as the club's new CEO. On November 13, 2025, the club announced Oliver Wyss as the new Chairman and Chief Soccer Officer of the club. He had most recently been the Head of Global Football Development and Sporting Director of the United Soccer League. In his previous club role in the front office of Orange County SC, he helped lead the club to their first ever USL Championship league title. On January 19, 2026, Monterey Bay announced a partnership with Liga MX club C.F. Pachuca. The two clubs will collaborate on scouting as well as player and coaching development. The partnership will also result in Monterey Bay's first ever international friendly hosted at Cardinale Stadium, on February 28, 2026, against C.F. Pachuca Select. On January 27, 2026, the club announced the creation of a women's soccer team to begin play in the USL W League in the 2026 season as a member of the NorCal division. The women's team would have its own crest and name instead of using those of the men's team. The Monterey Bay Sirens branding was unveiled on March 28, 2026. On February 12, 2026, the club announced another international club partnership, this time with Germany's FC Schalke 04. The partnership was the first between a USL Championship club and a German Bundesliga or 2. Bundesliga club. On April 29, 2026, the club announced that they had parted ways with head coach Jordan Stewart and assistant coach Troy McKerrell. On the same day, Alex Covelo was announced as Stewart's successor.

== Stadium ==
=== Cardinale Stadium ===
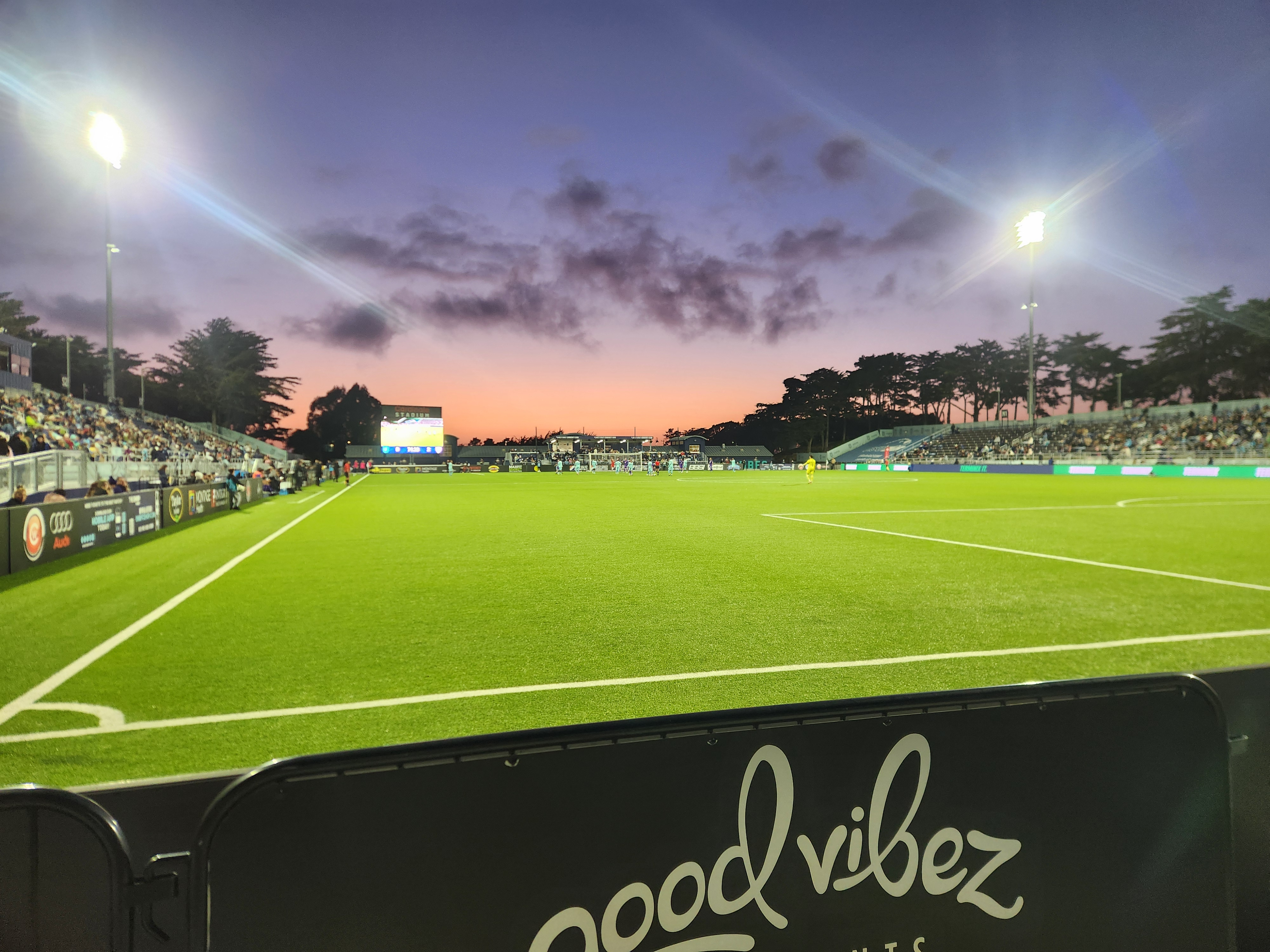
Cardinale Stadium during a May 2025 match.

Monterey Bay FC plays their games at what was Freeman Stadium on the campus of California State University, Monterey Bay. The stadium was renovated with private funds and holds 6,000 fans. Ground breaking for the stadium renovations took place on September 16, 2021. The team entered into a multi-year partnership with the Cardinale Automotive Group for the stadium naming rights. The venue was renamed Cardinale Stadium, which opened on May 7, 2022. As of the 2025 season, the stadium hosts both the USL Championship team as well as the club's USL League Two side, Monterey Bay FC 2. In March 2025, Monterey Bay FC and CSUMB proposed a stadium upgrade project that would improve the facilities in and around the stadium which would allow for more events to be hosted at the stadium. The upgrades include permanent men's and women's locker rooms, which would open the door to Monterey Bay potentially hosting a women's team.

== Broadcast ==
On February 28, 2023, the club announced their first local broadcast deal, with KION-TV to broadcast Monterey Bay's 17 USL Championship home matches on their affiliated FOX 35 or Central Coast CW channels.

== Colors and badge ==
First crest used by the club, from the 2022 to the 2024 season.

Monterey Bay Football Club's official colors are Crisp Blue, Kelp Blue, Dune Yellow and White.

=== Kit history ===
Home and away kits.

- Home

2022–23	2024	2025	2026

- Away

2022	2023	2024	2025	2026

- Third

2022	2023	2024	2025	2026

=== Sponsorship ===
Seasons	Kit manufacturer	Shirt sponsor	Sleeve sponsor
2022–2024	(United States) Puma	Montage Health	Taylor Farms
2025–present	(Mexico) Charly	Montage Health	Taylor Farms

== Supporters ==
The Rising Tide, Los Hinchas, Fogdog Footy, and Fuerza Union 831 are among the primary supporters groups for the club. They typically are found in the bleacher seats behind the East goal line.

== Monterey Bay FC 2 ==
On February 6, 2023, the club announced Monterey Bay FC 2, a development team joining USL League Two as part of the newly formed Nor Cal Division. The team began play in summer 2023 primarily based in Salinas, California. The head coach for the first season was current Monterey Bay F.C. assistant Ramiro Corrales, who took on the role in addition to his first-team duties. Mark Christie and Monterey Bay goalkeeper Carlos Herrera served as his assistant coaches. In its inaugural season, the team played four of their six home matches at Rabobank Stadium and the remaining two matches at the senior team's home, Cardinale Stadium in Seaside, California. Outside of local scouting and player development, the goal of the team in the words of club owner Ray Beshoff is also to be a "good bridge that we need" from the professional team to the community of Salinas. The club's initial open tryouts saw 85% of the players either currently based in or originally from Monterey County, with the largest amount of registrants coming from Salinas. The inaugural roster featured eight players that were either current or former Cal State University Monterey Bay Otters. The team's primary jersey sponsor is Salinas based Taylor Farms, while the sleeve is sponsored by Montage Health.

On April 22, 2023, the team played its first match, a preseason match against MLS Next Pro side San Jose Earthquakes II. CSUMB student José Jesús Madrigal scored the club's first goal in what ended as a 1–1 draw at Rabobank Stadium. The team's first regular season match was on May 6, 2023, a 2–1 win against San Francisco City FC. Monterey Bay clinched their first League Two playoff appearance and first Nor Cal division title in their inaugural season. They lost their playoff appearance 1–0 away to then defending league champions Ventura County Fusion.

On October 28, 2023, Monterey Bay FC Principal Owner Ray Beshoff stated that one of the club's goals is to develop MBFC2 into a year-round program. On February 5, 2023, the club announced a U-18 Development Academy. This program would lead straight into MBFC2, which is seen as a U-23 program. On February 22, 2024, Pierce Gallaway became the first MBFC2 player to be signed to a first-team contract. On March 13, 2024, two more MBFC2 players, Miguel Guerrero and Anthony Orendain, were added to the first team's roster ahead of the 2024 USL Championship season. The fourth MBFC2 alum joined the first team on April 12, 2024, when goalkeeper Fabian Narez was signed to a 25-day contract. Ahead of the team's second season, Monterey Bay player Simon Dawkins took over as head coach from Ramiro Corrales.

Ahead of the 2025 USL League Two season, MBFC2 moved to Cardinale Stadium as their full-time home stadium after playing the majority of their matches in Salinas' Rabobank Stadium the previous two seasons. The team departed League Two ahead of the 2026 season.

== Monterey Bay Sirens ==
Monterey Bay FC announced the creation of an amateur women's team on January 27, 2026. The club began play in the USL W League in the 2026 season as a member of the NorCal division. Laura VanWart, the head coach of CSUMB's women's soccer team. On February 25, 2026, Monterey Bay announced a partnership with local nonprofit Salinas Soccer Femenil which operates the amateur Cosmos Femenil F.C., playing in the Women's Premier Soccer League's Division II, as well as a Sunday League team, and a girl's academy. The two organizations will collaborate to identify talent to play on Monterey Bay and Cosmos teams. Monterey Bay Sirens team will train at the Salinas Regional Soccer Complex and play matches at Cardinale Stadium. On March 28, the team name was officially unveiled as Monterey Bay Sirens, named after the Greek mythological sea creature. The team's crest is unique from the men's team, featuring a siren in the badge, but uses the same colors as the men's team. The Sirens finished their inaugural regular season with an 8-1-1 record, clinching the NorCal division and a spot in the W League playoffs.

== Players ==
=== Current roster ===
As of September 26, 2026

Note: Flags indicate national team as defined under FIFA eligibility rules; some limited exceptions apply. Players may hold more than one non-FIFA nationality.

No.	Pos.	Nation	Player
1	GK	MEX	Fernando Delgado
2	DF	USA	Abdel Talabi
3	DF	USA	Stuart Ritchie
4	MF	SCO	Nicholas Ross
5	DF	MSR	Nico Gordon
6	DF	MNE	Luka Malešević
7	MF	USA	Adrian Rebollar
10	MF	ARG	Facundo Canete
11	FW	USA	Wesley Leggett
14	MF	JPN	Ryuga Nakamura
15	MF	MEX	Fidel Barajas (on loan from Guadalajara)
16	MF	NCA	Jacob Montes
17	FW	GUY	Omari Glasgow (on loan from Chicago Fire)
18	MF	HAI	Belmar Joseph Jr. (on loan from Sion)
20	FW	USA	Ilijah Paul

No.	Pos.	Nation	Player
21	FW	PER	Diego Otoya (on loan from Sporting Cristal)
22	DF	USA	Joel Garcia Jr.
23	MF	USA	Eduardo Blancas
25	DF	CAN	Kelsey Egwu
26	MF	USA	Arjang Pakbaz
28	DF	USA	Andres O’Neal
29	FW	USA	Djimon Anderson
30	MF	USA	Angel Villasana
31	GK	USA	Ciaran Dalton
32	DF	USA	Zack Farnsworth
33	DF	USA	Diego Carbajal
47	DF	USA	Quinton Elliot (on loan from Columbus Crew)
88	MF	USA	Sebastian Lletget
93	MF	BRA	Judson
98	GK	USA	Jacob Jackson (on loan from San Diego FC)

USL Academy player
25-day contract

==== Out on loan ====
No.	Pos.	Nation	Player
9	FW	NZL	Riley Bidois (on loan to Wellington Phoenix FC through 2026–27 A-League Men season)

=== Club captains ===
Years	Name	Nation
2022–2023	Hugh Roberts	United States
2024	Kai Greene	United States
2025–	Nico Gordon	Montserrat

== Staff ==
As of December 19, 2025

Front office
Owner	Ray Beshoff
Chairman and Chief Soccer Officer	Oliver Wyss
Chief executive officer	Mike Sheehan
Vice-President, Corporate Partnerships	Carly Eggers

As of July 3, 2026

Technical staff
Sporting Coordinator	Simon Dawkins
Head coach	Alex Covelo
Assistant coach/U-20 Head Coach	Chris Gribben
Performance Analyst & Scout	Elian Corona
Strength & Conditioning	Emmanuel Espinoza
Athletic Trainer	Kelly Luekens
Equipment Manager	Obed Galarza

== International and domestic club partnerships ==
Monterey Bay established partnerships with Liga MX's C.F. Pachuca and 2. Bundesliga's FC Schalke 04 in early 2026. The latter partnership allows Monterey Bay to work with Schalke's other partner clubs: VVV-Venlo of the Dutch Eerste Divisie, FC Aarau of the Swiss Challenge League, and SV Ried of the Austrian Bundesliga. Monterey Bay played its first ever international friendly against C.F. Pachuca Select on February 28, 2026.

Monterey Bay established a club partnership for their Sirens women's team in February 2026. The club partnered with Salinas Soccer Femenil, which operates the amateur Cosmos Femenil F.C. who play in the Women's Premier Soccer League's Division II. The Cosmos also feature a Sunday League team and a girl's academy.

== Team records ==
=== Year-by-year ===
Season	Record											Position		Playoffs	USOC	Average attendance	Top goalscorer(s)	
Season	Div	League	Pld	W	L	D	GF	GA	GD	Pts	PPG	Conf.	Overall	Playoffs	USOC	Average attendance	Name	Goals
2022	2	USLC	34	12	18	4	42	59	–17	40	1.18	12th	21st	Did not qualify	R2	3,643	(United States) Chase Boone (England) Sam Gleadle	8
2023	2	USLC	34	11	15	8	42	53	–11	41	1.21	11th	19th	Did not qualify	R3	3,963	(United States) Alex Dixon	12
2024	2	USLC	34	8	16	10	29	44	–15	34	1.00	11th	22nd	Did not qualify	Ro32	4,107	(United States) Tristan Trager	8

=== Head coaches ===
- Includes USL Regular Season, USL Cup, USL Playoffs, U.S. Open Cup. Excludes friendlies.

Coach	Nationality	Start	End	Games	Win	Loss	Draw	GF	GA	Win %
Frank Yallop	Canada	April 22, 2021	July 31, 2024	95	33	45	17	116	152	34.74
Simon Dawkins (interim)	Jamaica	August 1, 2024	August 5, 2024	1	0	0	1	2	2	0.00
Jordan Stewart	England	August 5, 2024	present	12	1	7	4	8	15	8.33
