= 2021 Oakland Roots SC season =

Oakland Roots SC
2021 season
- Chairman: Steven Aldrich
- Head coach: Jordan Ferrell (interim)
- Stadium: Laney College Football Stadium
- Highest home attendance: 5,044 (10/2 vs. LV)
- Lowest home attendance: 813 (7/10 vs. LV)
- Average home league attendance: 2,016
- Biggest win: LV 1–3 OAK (8/21); OAK 3–1 PHX (8/25)
- Biggest defeat: PHX 3–0 OAK (5/8); LA 3–0 OAK (7/25)

The 2021 Oakland Roots SC season was the club's third season of existence and first in the USL Championship. Prior to this, the team played two seasons in the third division National Independent Soccer Association.

== Squad information ==
=== First team squad ===
As of September 28, 2021

No.	Pos.	Nation	Player
1	GK	CUW	Zeus de la Paz
2	MF	COD	Ariel Mbumba
3	DF	JPN	Soya Takahashi
4	DF	USA	Max Ornstil
5	MF	GER	Wal Fall
6	DF	USA	Tarek Morad
7	MF	ARG	Matías Fissore
9	FW	COD	Jeremy Bokila
10	MF	RSA	Lindo Mfeka
11	MF	USA	Chuy Enríquez
12	MF	CMR	Joseph Nane
14	FW	ENG	Tyler Blackwood
15	DF	USA	Akeem Ward
16	DF	USA	Travian Sousa
17	DF	USA	Tarn Weir
18	MF	MEX	José Hernández
19	FW	USA	Joseph Restani
20	GK	USA	Paul Blanchette
21	DF	MNE	Emrah Klimenta
23	MF	USA	Memo Diaz
25	FW	USA	Quincy Amarikwa
28	FW	JAM	Brian Brown (on loan from New Mexico United)
29	FW	USA	Brandon Allen
30	FW	USA	Javier Mariona
33	DF	USA	Kai Greene
47	GK	USA	Taylor Bailey
61	FW	USA	Johnny Rodriguez
91	MF	ERI	Yohannes Harish
99	GK	USA	Marco Brougher

USL Academy player
On a USL Academy arrangement with Virginia Tech Hokies
On a USL Academy arrangement with De Anza Force and California Golden Bears
On an unknown USL Academy arrangement

=== Coaching staff ===
As of February 1, 2021

Position	Staff
Interim Head Coach & Technical Director	(United States) Jordan Ferrell
Assistant Coach	(United States) Christopher Malenab
Assistant Coach	(Canada) Nana Attakora
Assistant Coach	(Puerto Rico) Noah Delgado
Goalkeeeping Coach	(United States) Jeremey Clark
VP of Soccer	(United States) Eric Yamamoto
Director of Performance	(United States) Ben Stadler
Director of Team Operations	(United States) Valentin Saldaña Jr.
Team Operations Manager	(Turkmenistan) Berdi Merdanov
Team Scout	(United States) Jonathan Orozco
Athletic Trainer	(United States) Crystal Lee
Head Team Physician	(United States) Kevin M. Roth, MD
Team Chiropractor	(United States) Rafael Zamora
Message Theropist	(United States) Betsy Abel
Mental Health & Sport Performance Specialist	(United States) Lisa Bonta Sumii

Source: Oakland Roots SC

== Transfers ==
=== In ===
No.	Pos.	Player	Transferred from	Fee/notes	Date	Source
8	MF	(United States) Saalih Muhammad	(United States) New Mexico United	Undisclosed	November 24, 2020	
4	DF	(United States) Max Ornstil	(United States) Portland Timbers 2	Free transfer	December 1, 2020	
91	MF	(Eritrea) Yohannes Harish	(United States) Oakland Roots	Re-signed	December 8, 2020	
55	DF	(United States) Tarn Weir	(United States) Oakland Roots	Re-signed	December 10, 2020	
10	MF	(Democratic Republic of the Congo) Ariel Mbumba	(United States) Oakland Roots	Re-signed	December 11, 2020	
20	FW	(United States) Johnny Rodriguez	(United States) Oakland Roots	Re-signed	December 14, 2020	
14	DF	(United States) Tarek Morad	(United States) San Diego Loyal	Free transfer	December 21, 2020	
25	FW	(United States) Jesús "Chuy" Enríquez	(United States) Reno 1868	Free transfer	December 29, 2020	
22	MF	(Mexico) José Hernández	(United States) OKC Energy	Free transfer	January 8, 2021	
3	MF	(United States) Memo Diaz	(United States) El Paso Locomotive	Free transfer	January 11, 2021	
24	DF	(United States) Akeem Ward	(United States) North Carolina FC	Free transfer	January 13, 2021	
21	DF	(South Africa) Lindo Mfeka	Unattached	Free transfer	January 19, 2021	
23	FW	(Democratic Republic of the Congo) Jeremy Bokila	(Turkey) Ankara Keçiörengücü	Free transfer	January 21, 2021	
26	GK	(United States) Ben Beaury	(United States) New Mexico United	Free transfer	February 1, 2021	
5	MF	(Germany) Wal Fall	(United States) Saint Louis FC	Free transfer	February 4, 2021	
1	GK	(Curaçao) Zeus de la Paz	(England) Oldham Athletic	Free transfer	February 17, 2021	
15	MF	(Argentina) Matías Fissore	(Argentina) San Martín de Tucumán	Free transfer	March 4, 2021	
11	FW	(England) Tyler Blackwood	(United States) Saint Louis FC	Free transfer	March 11, 2021	
	DF	(Japan) Soya Takahashi	(Sweden) Umeå FC	Free transfer	March 29, 2021	
	MF	(United States) Danny Flores	(United States) Philadelphia Union II	Free transfer	April 19, 2021	
	GK	(United States) Taylor Bailey	(United States) Oakland Roots	Re-signed	April 20, 2021	

=== Out ===
No.	Pos.	Player	Transferred to	Fee/notes	Date	Source
06	FW	(United States) Matthew Fondy	Unattached	Not re-signed		
8	MF	(United States) Angel Heredia	Unattached	Not re-signed		
9	FW	(United States) Jack McInerney	Unattached	Not re-signed		
11	FW	(United States) Tristan Bowen	Unattached	Not re-signed		
16	MF	(Republic of Ireland) Niall Irwin	Unattached	Not re-signed		
27	FW	(Mexico) Julio Cervantes	Unattached	Not re-signed		
32	MF	(Colombia) Manny González	Unattached	Not re-signed		
33	DF	(United States) Robert Hines II	Unattached	Not re-signed		
88	DF	(South Korea) Seo-In Kim	Chicago House AC	Not re-signed		
90	GK	(United States) Kevin Gonzalez	Unattached	Not re-signed		
22	MF	(Mexico) Diego Casillas	(United States) Reno 1868	Loan completed	October 1, 2020	
5	DF	(Canada) Nana Attakora	Unattached	Retired, joined coaching staff	November 17, 2020	
98	MF	(United States) Jonathan Orozco	(United States) Project 51O	Joined coaching staff and reserve team	December 10, 2020	
1	GK	(Mexico) Christian Herrera	(United States) Tacoma Defiance	Free transfer	December 15, 2020	
2	DF	(United States) Daniel Navarro	(United States) Chattanooga Red Wolves	Not re-signed	February 5, 2021	
12	MF	(United States) Peter Pearson	(United States) North Carolina FC	Not re-signed	February 17, 2021	
19	FW	(United States) Josiah Romero	(United States) Los Angeles Force	Not re-signed	March 23, 2021	
10	MF	(El Salvador) Nelson Blanco	(United States) North Carolina FC	Not re-signed	March 26, 2021	
50	DF	(United States) David Abidor	(United States) Chicago House AC	Not re-signed	June 4, 2021	

=== Loan in ===
No.	Pos.	Player	Loaned from	Fee/notes	Date	Source

=== Loan out ===
No.	Pos.	Player	Loaned to	Fee/notes	Date	Source

== Competitions ==
=== Friendlies ===
Kickoff times are in PDT (UTC-07) unless shown otherwise

April 2 Preseason	Tacoma Defiance	2–1	Oakland Roots	Tacoma, Washington
11:00 a.m. PDT		Report		Stadium: Cheney Stadium; Attendance: 0

April 9 Preseason	San Jose Earthquakes	3–2	Oakland Roots	San Jose, California
10:05 PDT		Report		Stadium: Earthquakes Stadium; Attendance: 0

April 17 Preseason	Sacramento Republic	5–1	Oakland Roots	Sacramento, California
TBD PDT		Report		Stadium: Papa Murphy's Park

April 24 Preseason	Las Vegas Lights FC	2–1	Oakland Roots	Fresno, California
2:00 p.m. PDT				Attendance: 0

May 1 Preseason	Santa Clara University	1–1	Oakland Roots	Santa Clara, California
11:00 1.m. PDT				Attendance: 0

=== USL Championship ===
Overall								Home						Away					
Pld	W	D	L	GF	GA	GD	Pts	W	D	L	GF	GA	GD	W	D	L	GF	GA	GD
32	11	8	13	36	43	−7	41	7	4	5	19	16	+3	4	4	8	17	27	−10

==== Results by round ====
Round	1	2	3	4	5	6	7	8	9	10	11	12	13	14	15	16	17	18	19	20	21	22	23	24	25	26	27	28	29	30	31	32
Stadium	A	A	A	A	H	H	A	A	H	H	H	A	H	H	A	H	A	A	H	A	A	H	H	H	A	H	H	A	H	A	A	H
Result	L	W	D	L	D	D	L	D	L	L	L	L	L	W	D	W	W	W	L	W	D	W	L	W	L	D	W	L	L	D	W	W
Position	6	6	5	7																												

Updated to match(es) played on June 12, 2021. Source: Match reports
A = Away; H = Home; W = Win; D = Draw; L = Loss

==== Matches ====
May 8 1	Phoenix Rising FC	3–0	Oakland Roots SC	Chandler, Arizona
7:30 PM PDT (UTC-07)	Asante 10', 68'; King (yellow card) 29'; Moar 48'; Lambert (yellow card) 50'; Billingsley (yellow card) 83'; Quinn (yellow card) 86'; Musa (yellow card) 87'	Report	Weir (yellow card) 85'; Ward (yellow card) 87'	Stadium: Phoenix Rising Soccer Complex at Wild Horse Pass; Attendance: 5,000; Referee: Elton Garcia

May 23 2	LA Galaxy II	2–3	Oakland Roots SC	Carson, California
7:30 PM PDT (UTC-07)	Picazo 31'; Mbumba 61' (o.g.); Judd (yellow card) 81'	Report	Flores (yellow card) 20', (goal) 47'; Diaz 76'; Bokila 90+1'	Stadium: Dignity Health Sports Park; Referee: Brandon Stevis

June 2 3	Sacramento Republic FC	3–3	Oakland Roots SC	Sacramento, California
8:00 PM PDT (UTC-07)	Formella 19'; Iwasa 60'; McCrary 68', (yellow card) 73'; Luis Felipe (yellow card) 77'	Report	Enríquez 26'; Mbumba 40'; Ward (yellow card) 52'; Bokila 66', (yellow card) 85'; Fall (yellow card) 78'	Stadium: Heart Health Park; Attendance: 2,513; Referee: Nicholas Marin

June 12 4	Orange County SC	1–0	Oakland Roots SC	Irvine, California
7:00 PM PDT (UTC-07)	Kuningas (yellow card) 39'; Damus 45'	Report	Takahashi (yellow card) 38'; Klimenta (yellow card) 46'; Ornstil (yellow card) 90+2'	Stadium: Championship Soccer Stadium; Attendance: 2,082; Referee: Matthew Corrigan

June 19 5	Oakland Roots SC	P–P	Sacramento Republic FC	Oakland, California
5:30 PM PDT (UTC-07)				Stadium: Laney College Football Stadium

June 26 6	Oakland Roots SC	0–0	Austin Bold FC	Livermore, California
5:30 PM PDT (UTC-07)	Klimenta (yellow card) 25'; Ward (yellow card) 29'; Mbumba (yellow card) 41'; Enríquez (yellow card) 63'	Report	Ycaza (yellow card) 8'; Okoli (yellow card) 64'	Stadium: Las Positas College Turf Field; Referee: Joseph Salinas

June 29 7	San Diego Loyal SC	1–0	Oakland Roots SC	San Diego, California
7:30 PM PDT (UTC-07)	Martin (yellow card) 60'; Ibarra 72'; Guerrero (yellow card) 90+6'	Report	Diaz (yellow card) 32'; Ornstil (yellow card) 90+1'	Stadium: Torero Stadium; Attendance: 3,152; Referee: Elvis Osmanovic

July 7 8	Sacramento Republic FC	0–0	Oakland Roots SC	Sacramento, California
8:00 PM PDT (UTC-07)	Chavez (yellow card) 88'; Formella (yellow card) 90+4'	Report	Fall (yellow card) 75'	Stadium: Heart Health Park; Attendance: 8,118; Referee: Mark Allatin

July 10 9	Oakland Roots SC	1–2	Las Vegas Lights FC	Livermore, California
7:00 PM PDT (UTC-07)	Weir 24'; Ward (yellow card) 79'; Diaz (yellow card) 88'	Report	Crisostomo (yellow card) 47', (goal) 55'; Leone 74'; Molina (yellow card) 90'; Traore (yellow card) 90+6'	Stadium: Las Positas College Turf Field; Attendance: 813; Referee: Ismir Pekmic

July 25 10	LA Galaxy II	3–0	Oakland Roots SC	Carson, California
5:00 PM PDT (UTC-07)	Hernandez (yellow card) 22', (goal) 85'; Drack 33'; Harvey (yellow card) 35', (goal) 78'; Essengue (yellow card) 46'	Report	Ward (yellow card) 62'; Hernández (yellow card) 71'; Harish (yellow card) 68'; Blackwood (yellow card) 90+2'	Stadium: Dignity Health Sports Park; Referee: Matthew Thompson

July 31 11	Oakland Roots SC	0–3	Orange County SC	Oakland, California
5:30 PM PDT (UTC-07)	Greene (yellow card) 15'; Diaz (yellow card) 51'; Ornstil (red card) 55'; Morad (yellow card) 65'; Bokila (yellow card) 81'; Klimenta (yellow card) 82'	Report	McCabe (yellow card) 21'; Henry 31'; Damus 36'; Richards (yellow card) 43'; Iloski (yellow card) 55'; Wehan (yellow card) 57'; Apodaca 76'	Stadium: Laney College Football Stadium; Referee: Jonathan Bilinski

August 4 12	Oakland Roots SC	0–1	Phoenix Rising FC	Oakland, California
7:00 PM PDT (UTC-07)		Report	King (yellow card) 10'; Quinn 64'; Schmitt (yellow card) 68'	Stadium: Laney College Football Stadium; Attendance: 3,218; Referee: Ricardo Fierro

August 8 13	Tacoma Defiance	3–1	Oakland Roots SC	Tacoma, Washington
1:30 pm (PDT)	Adeniran 25', 45+1' (pen.); Alvarez 45+4'; Mendoza (yellow card) 77'	Report	Hernández (yellow card) 45'; Enríquez (yellow card) 50'; Fall 55'	Stadium: Cheney Stadium; Attendance: 1,007; Referee: Adorae Monroy

August 11 5	Oakland Roots SC	0–0	Sacramento Republic FC	Oakland, California
7:00 PM PDT (UTC-07)		Report	Alashe (yellow card) 88'; Chavez (yellow card) 90+5'	Stadium: Laney College Football Stadium; Referee: William Hoffman

August 14 14	Oakland Roots SC	2–1	LA Galaxy II	Oakland, California
7:00 PM PDT (UTC-07)	Ornstil (yellow card) 11', (goal) 25'; Harish 26', (yellow card) 66'; Hernández (yellow card) 40'; Ward (yellow card) 56'	Report	Hernandez 12'; Lambe (red card) 22'; Harvey (yellow card) 68'; Vázquez (yellow card) 90+2'	Stadium: Laney College Football Stadium; Attendance: 3,451; Referee: Sergii Demianchuk

August 18 15	New Mexico United	1–1	Oakland Roots SC	Albuquerque, New Mexico
6:30 PM PDT (UTC-07)	Sandoval 6'; Moreno (yellow card) 83'	Report	Fall 34'	Stadium: Isotopes Park; Attendance: 6,047; Referee: Elton Garcia

August 21 16	Las Vegas Lights FC	1–3	Oakland Roots SC	Las Vegas, Nevada
7:30 PM PDT (UTC-07)	Musovski 48'; Uche (yellow card) 85'	Report	Ornstil (yellow card) 30'; Hernández 52'; Enríquez 60'; Bokila 82'	Stadium: Cashman Field; Referee: Matthew Corrigan

August 25 17	Oakland Roots SC	3–1	Phoenix Rising FC	Livermore, California
8:00 PM PDT (UTC-07)	Fall 43'; Hernández 51', (yellow card) 71'; Mbumba 61'	Report	Bakero (yellow card) 45'; King 53', (yellow card) 70'	Stadium: Las Positas College; Referee: William Hoffman

August 28 18	Oakland Roots SC	3–1	Tacoma Defiance	Livermore, California
7:30 PM PDT (UTC-07)	Greene (yellow card) 5', (goal) 13'; Fall (penalty missed) 54'; Mbumba 57'; Bokila 82', (yellow card) 90'	Report	Ragen (yellow card) 18'; Brewitt 45+3'; Mueller (yellow card) 72'; Anguiano (yellow card) 84'	Stadium: Las Positas College; Attendance: 4,118; Referee: Elijio Arreguin

September 3 19	Tampa Bay Rowdies	3–0	Oakland Roots SC	St. Petersburg, Florida
4:30 PM PDT (UTC-07)	Guillén (yellow card) 19'; Guenzatti 30'; Dalgaard 41'; Mkosana 82'	Report	Hernández (yellow card) 85'	Stadium: Al Lang Stadium; Attendance: 3,514; Referee: Gerald Flores

September 8 20	Las Vegas Lights FC	0–1	Oakland Roots SC	Las Vegas, Nevada
7:00 PM PDT (UTC-07)		Report	Fall (yellow card) 41'; Rodriguez 63'; Hernández (yellow card) 90'; Diaz (yellow card) 90+1'	Stadium: Cashman Field; Referee: Mark Allatin

September 11 21	Oakland Roots SC	0–0	San Diego Loyal SC	Livermore, California
7:00 PM PDT (UTC-07)	Ornstil (yellow card) 9'; Hernández (yellow card) 51'; Mbumba (yellow card) 90+3'	Report	Moshobane (yellow card) 44'; Martínez (yellow card) 62'; Facchineri (yellow card) 81'; Adams (yellow card) 90+5'	Stadium: Las Positas College; Attendance: 4,367; Referee: Jeremy Scheer

September 15 22	Oakland Roots SC	3–1	Tacoma Defiance	Livermore, California
8:00 PM PDT (UTC-07)	Mfeka 10', 53'; Fall 40', (yellow card) 51'; Takahashi (yellow card) 77'; Hernández (yellow card) 87'	Report	Serrano 32'; Brewitt (yellow card) 49'; Villanueva (yellow card) 70'	Stadium: Las Positas College; Referee: Corbyn May

September 18 23	Oakland Roots SC	0–1	LA Galaxy II	Oakland, California
7:00 PM PDT (UTC-07)		Report	Davila 75' (pen.); Hernandez (yellow card) 85'; Drack (yellow card) 90'; Zubak (yellow card) 90+2'	Stadium: Laney College Football Stadium; Attendance: 4,802; Referee: Elvis Osmanovic

September 22 24	Oakland Roots SC	2–1	San Diego Loyal SC	Oakland, California
7:00 PM PDT (UTC-07)	Rodriguez 6', (yellow card) 31'; Greene (yellow card) 55'; Hernández 63' (pen.); Bokila (yellow card) 69'; Amarikwa (yellow card) 85'; Mfeka (yellow card) 87'	Report	Hertzog (yellow card) 23'; C. Martin (yellow card) 27', (goal) 45+1'; Ibarra (yellow card) 58'	Stadium: Laney College Football Stadium; Referee: Joshua Encarnación

September 25 25	Orange County SC	2–1	Oakland Roots SC	Irvine, California
7:00 PM PDT (UTC-07)	Orozco 45+1', (yellow card) 54'; Iloski (yellow card) 66'; Alston (yellow card) 82'; Kuningas (yellow card) 84', (goal) 90+1'; Damus (yellow card) 90+3'	Report	Mbumba 19'; Hernández (yellow card) 56'; Bokila (yellow card) 88'	Stadium: Championship Soccer Stadium; Attendance: 4,014; Referee: William Hoffman

October 2 26	Oakland Roots SC	2–2	Las Vegas Lights FC	Livermore, California
7:00 PM PDT (UTC-07)	Amarikwa (penalty missed) 18', 24', (yellow card) 59'; Leone 29' (o.g.); Fissore (yellow card) 80'	Report	Trejo 5'; Traore (yellow card) 16' (yellow-red card) 73'; Sepulveda (yellow card) 27'; Uche 89'; El-mesmari (yellow card) 90+4'	Stadium: Las Positas College Turf Field; Attendance: 5,044; Referee: Michael Radchuk

October 6 27	Oakland Roots SC	2–1	Sacramento Republic FC	Oakland, California
5:30 PM PDT (UTC-07)	Amarikwa 10'; Diaz (yellow card) 28'; Fall (yellow card) 49'; Klimenta 63'	Report	Formella (yellow card) 28', (goal) 31'; Cuello (yellow card) 56'; McCrary (yellow card) 60'; Pennanen (yellow card) 90+2'	Stadium: Laney College Football Stadium; Attendance: 3,548; Referee: Joseph Salinas

October 9 28	Phoenix Rising FC	1–0	Oakland Roots SC	Chandler, Arizona
7:30 PM PDT (UTC-07)	Mattocks 11'; Saydee (yellow card) 90+6'	Report	Hernández (yellow card) 87'; Morad (yellow card) 90+1'	Stadium: Phoenix Rising Soccer Complex at Wild Horse Pass; Attendance: 8,095; Referee: Matthew Corrigan

October 16 29	Oakland Roots SC	0–1	Orange County SC	Oakland, California
5:30 PM PDT (UTC-07)	Diaz (yellow card) 30'; Hernández (yellow card) 54'; Fall (yellow card) 59'; Rodriguez (yellow card) 59'; Greene (yellow card) 86'	Report	Powers (penalty missed) 23'; Mines 25'; Smith (yellow card) 38'; Orozco (yellow card) 54'; Calvillo (yellow card) 86'	Stadium: Laney College Football Stadium; Attendance: 5,039; Referee: Elijio Arreguin

October 20 30	Tacoma Defiance	0–0	Oakland Roots SC	Tacoma, Washington
1:30 pm (PDT)		Report	Amarikwa (yellow card) 41'; Ornstil (yellow card) 90'; Mbumba (yellow card) 90+2'	Stadium: Cheney Stadium; Attendance: 833; Referee: Malik Badawi

October 24 31	San Diego Loyal SC	3–4	Oakland Roots SC	San Diego, California
3:00 PM PDT (UTC-07)	Williams 17', 76'; Adams (yellow card) 45'; Hertzog 85'; Guerrero (yellow card) 90+3'	Report	Enríquez (yellow card) 2', (goal) 52'; Montgomery 35' (o.g.); Amarikwa (yellow card) 37'; Ward 58', (yellow card) 70'; Morad (red card) 86'; Bokila 90+3' (pen.), (yellow card) 90+5'	Stadium: Torero Stadium; Referee: Lukasz Szpala

October 30 32	Oakland Roots SC	1–0	Sporting Kansas City II	Oakland, California
9:00 PM CDT	Enríquez 2'; Bokila (yellow card) 82'; Diaz (yellow card) 90+1'; Mbumba (yellow card) 90+4'	Report		Stadium: Laney College Football Stadium; Attendance: 5,508; Referee: William Hoffman

==== Playoffs ====
November 5 Conf. QF	El Paso Locomotive FC	0–1	Oakland Roots SC	El Paso, Texas
6:30 PM PDT	Fox (yellow card) 20'; Luna (yellow card) 78'	Report	Nane (yellow card) 26'; Bokila 76'; Morad (yellow card) 90+3'	Stadium: Southwest University Park; Attendance: 7,201; Referee: Ismir Pekmic

November 13 Conf. SF	Orange County SC	0–0 (6–5 p)	Oakland Roots SC	Irvine, California
7:00 PM PST		Report	Ward (yellow card) 97'	Stadium: Championship Soccer Stadium; Attendance: 5,218; Referee: Matthew Thompson
	Penalties
	Kuningas (penalty scored); Powers (penalty scored); Casiple (penalty scored); Enevoldsen (penalty scored); Okoli (penalty scored); Damus (penalty scored)		Morad (penalty scored); Bokila (penalty scored); Mbumba (penalty scored); Nane (penalty scored); Harish (penalty scored); Ward (penalty missed)

==== League table ====
Pos	Div	Team	Pld	W	D	L	GF	GA	GD	Pts	Qualification
8	MT	New Mexico United	32	12	10	10	44	40	+4	46	
9	MT	Austin Bold FC	32	10	12	10	32	42	−10	42	
10	PC	Oakland Roots SC	32	11	8	13	36	43	−7	41	Playoffs
11	PC	LA Galaxy II	32	11	6	15	55	57	−2	39	
12	PC	Tacoma Defiance	32	10	9	13	37	41	−4	39	

Source: USL Championship
Rules for classification: 1) points; 2) head-to-head points; 3) head-to-head goal differential; 4) total points earned against in-division opponents; 5) total regular season wins against in-division opponents; 6) total goal differential against in-division opponents; 7) total goals scored against in-division opponents; 8) disciplinary points; 9) coin toss or drawing of lots.

== Squad statistics ==
As of Match played October 2, 2020

=== Appearances and goals ===
No.	Pos	Nat	Player	Total		Regular Season		U.S. Open Cup	
No.	Pos	Nat	Player	Apps	Goals	Apps	Goals	Apps	Goals
Goalkeepers
1	GK	(Curaçao) CUW	Zeus de la Paz	0	0	0+0	0	0+0	0
26	GK	(United States) USA	Ben Beaury	0	0	0+0	0	0+0	0
47	GK	(United States) USA	Taylor Bailey	0	0	0+0	0	0+0	0
Defenders
4	DF	(United States) USA	Max Ornstil	0	0	0+0	0	0+0	0
6	DF	(United States) USA	Tarek Morad	0	0	0+0	0	0+0	0
15	DF	(United States) USA	Akeem Ward	0	0	0+0	0	0+0	0
17	DF	(United States) USA	Tarn Weir	0	0	0+0	0	0+0	0
3	DF	(Japan) JPN	Soya Takahashi	0	0	0+0	0	0+0	0
Midfielders
23	MF	(United States) USA	Memo Diaz	0	0	0+0	0	0+0	0
5	MF	(Germany) GER	Wal Fall	0	0	0+0	0	0+0	0
8	MF	(United States) USA	Saalih Muhammad	0	0	0+0	0	0+0	0
2	MF	(Democratic Republic of the Congo) COD	Ariel Mbumba	0	0	0+0	0	0+0	0
7	MF	(Argentina) ARG	Matías Fissore	0	0	0+0	0	0+0	0
10	DF	(South Africa) RSA	Lindo Mfeka	0	0	0+0	0	0+0	0
18	MF	(Mexico) MEX	José Hernández	0	0	0+0	0	0+0	0
91	MF	(Eritrea) ERI	Yohannes Harish	0	0	0+0	0	0+0	0
22	MF	(United States) USA	Danny Flores	0	0	0+0	0	0+0	0
11	FW	(United States) USA	Chuy Enríquez	0	0	0+0	0	0+0	0
Forwards
14	FW	(England) ENG	Tyler Blackwood	0	0	0+0	0	0+0	0
61	FW	(United States) USA	Johnny Rodriguez	0	0	0+0	0	0+0	0
9	FW	(Democratic Republic of the Congo) COD	Jeremy Bokila	0	0	0+0	0	0+0	0

=== Goal scorers ===
Place	Position	Nation	Number	Name	Regular Season	U.S. Open Cup	Total

=== Disciplinary record ===
Number	Nation	Position	Name	Regular Season		U.S. Open Cup		Total	
Number	Nation	Position	Name	Booked	Sent off (straight red)	Booked	Sent off (straight red)	Booked	Sent off (straight red)
