= 2022 Oakland Roots SC season =

Oakland Roots SC
2022 season
- Chairman: Steven Aldrich
- Head coach: Noah Delgado (interim)
- Stadium: Laney College Football Stadium
- USLC: Conference: 7th
- USLC Playoffs: Conference Semifinals
- U.S. Open Cup: Second round
Home colors	Away colors

The 2022 Oakland Roots SC season was the club's fourth season of existence and second in the USL Championship. Prior to this, the team played two seasons in the third division National Independent Soccer Association.

== Squad information ==
As of May 22, 2022

No.	Pos.	Nation	Player
4	DF	USA	Max Ornstil
5	MF	CMR	Joseph Nane
6	DF	USA	Tarek Morad
7	MF	ARG	Matías Fissore
8	MF	MEX	José Hernández
9	FW	POL	Dariusz Formella
10	MF	RSA	Lindo Mfeka
11	FW	USA	Jesús Enríquez
12	MF	ENG	Charlie Dennis
14	DF	USA	Danny Barbir
17	FW	USA	Johnny Rodriguez
18	FW	VEN	Juan Carlos Azócar
20	GK	USA	Paul Blanchette
21	DF	MNE	Emrah Klimenta
22	FW	ISL	Óttar Magnús Karlsson (on loan from Venezia)
23	MF	USA	Memo Diaz
25	FW	SLV	Javier Mariona
30	DF	VEN	Alejandro Fuenmayor
47	GK	USA	Taylor Bailey
60	GK	USA	Timothy Syrel
61	MF	USA	Javier Bedolla Vera
66	MF	SLV	Lorenzo Hernández
72	DF	VEN	Edgardo Rito
77	MF	NOR	Mikael Tørset Johnsen (on loan from Venezia)

USL Academy player

=== USL Championship ===
==== League table ====
Pos	Team	Pld	W	L	T	GF	GA	GD	Pts	Qualification
5	New Mexico United	34	13	9	12	49	40	+9	51	Playoffs
6	Rio Grande Valley Toros	34	14	13	7	51	40	+11	49	Playoffs
7	Oakland Roots SC	34	11	10	13	51	46	+5	46	Playoffs
8	El Paso Locomotive FC	34	13	14	7	56	52	+4	46	
9	Las Vegas Lights FC	34	12	13	9	40	50	−10	45	

Source: USL Championship Standings
Rules for classification: 1) head-to-head points; 2) head-to-head goal differential; 3) points-per game within conference; 4) total wins; 5) total goal differential; 6) total goals scored; 7) points earned against top four Conference finishers; 8) disciplinary points; 9) coin toss or drawing of lots

==== Matches ====
===== Regular season =====
March 12 1	Rio Grande Valley FC Toros	1–0	Oakland Roots SC	Edinburg, Texas
5:30 PM PDT	López 34'	Report		Stadium: H-E-B Park; Attendance: 5,132

March 19 2	Memphis 901 FC	2–1	Oakland Roots SC	Memphis, Tennessee
4:00 PM PDT	Molloy 13'; Seagrist 42'	Report	Formella 81'	Stadium: AutoZone Park; Attendance: 3,023

March 19 3	Oakland Roots SC	2–3	Monterey Bay FC	Oakland, California
7:00 PM PDT	Karlsson 39' (pen.), 49'	Report	Boone 8', 68'; Roberts 90'	Stadium: Laney College Football Stadium; Attendance: 5,508; Referee: Deshun Beard

March 30 4	New Mexico United	2–2	Oakland Roots SC	Albuquerque, New Mexico
6:00 PM PDT	Brett 45'+1'; Rivas 69'	Report	Dennis 8'; Morad 90'+1'	Stadium: Isotopes Park; Attendance: 7,731; Referee: Ricardo Fierro

April 2 5	Oakland Roots SC	0–0	Tampa Bay Rowdies	Oakland, California
7:00 PM PDT		Report		Stadium: Laney College Football Stadium; Attendance: 4,124; Referee: Luis Guardia

April 13 6	Oakland Roots SC	2–2	San Diego Loyal SC	Oakland, California
7:00 PM PDT	Morad (yellow card) 38' (yellow-red card) 64'; Azócar 86'; Karlsson 90'+4'	Report	Martin 52'; Stoneman 90'	Stadium: Laney College Football Stadium; Attendance: 4,017; Referee: Malik Badawi

April 16 7	Oakland Roots SC	4–1	Loudoun United FC	Oakland, California
7:00 PM PDT	Klimenta 26'; Karlsson 53' (pen.); Azócar 67'; Rito 76'	Report	Aboukoura 81'	Stadium: Laney College Football Stadium; Attendance: 3,807; Referee: Lorenzo Hernandez

April 23 8	El Paso Locomotive FC	1–1	Oakland Roots SC	El Paso, Texas
6:30 PM PDT	Barbir 31' (o.g.)	Report	Formella 13'	Stadium: Southwest University Park; Attendance: 5,727; Referee: Mark Allatin

April 30 9	Oakland Roots SC	0–3	Colorado Springs Switchbacks FC	Oakland, California
7:00 PM PDT		Report	Zandi 56'; Ngalina 69'; Barry 90'+2'	Stadium: Laney College Football Stadium; Attendance: 5,382; Referee: Michael Radchuk

May 7 10	Orange County SC	2–2	Oakland Roots SC	Irvine, California
7:00 PM PDT	Okoli 21'; Skendi 35'	Report	Rito 68'; Karlsson 90'+4'	Stadium: Championship Soccer Stadium; Attendance: 4,084; Referee: Elton García

May 14 11	Las Vegas Lights FC	1–1	Oakland Roots SC	Las Vegas, Nevada
7:00 PM PDT	Lara 24'	Report	Karlsson 3'	Stadium: Cashman Field; Referee: Malik Badawi

May 21 12	Oakland Roots SC	1–0	LA Galaxy II	Oakland, California
7:00 PM PDT	Karlsson 37' (pen.); Díaz (red card) 68'	Report		Stadium: Laney College Football Stadium; Attendance: 4,421; Referee: John Griggs

May 28 13	Oakland Roots SC	1–1	Sacramento Republic FC	Oakland, California
7:00 PM PDT	Karlsson 81' (pen.)	Report	Fernandes 42'	Stadium: Laney College Football Stadium; Attendance: 4,268; Referee: Greg Dopka

June 1 14	Oakland Roots SC	3–2	Orange County SC	Oakland, California
7:00 PM PDT	Karlsson 9', 90'+5'; Azócar 90'+3'	Report	Torres 32' (pen.); Skendi 65'	Stadium: Laney College Football Stadium; Attendance: 3,092; Referee: Ricardo Fierro

June 4 15	Monterey Bay FC	0–2	Oakland Roots SC	Seaside, California
7:00 PM PDT		Report	Rito 21'; Formella 90'+2'	Stadium: Cardinale Stadium; Attendance: 3,517; Referee: Brandon Stevis

June 11 16	Oakland Roots SC	2–2	Rio Grande Valley FC Toros	Oakland, California
7:00 PM PDT	Azócar 78'; Dennis 88'	Report	Coronado 14'; Ackwei 24'	Stadium: Laney College Football Stadium; Attendance: 4,215; Referee: Joseph Salinas

June 15 17	Oakland Roots SC	1–2	New Mexico United	Oakland, California
7:00 PM PDT	Rito 20'	Report	Brett 58'; Wehan 67'; Kiesewetter (red card) 90'+2'	Stadium: Laney College Football Stadium; Attendance: 3,752; Referee: Gerald Flores

June 18 18	San Antonio FC	1-1	Oakland Roots SC	San Antonio, Texas
6:00 PM PDT	Adeniran 45'+1'	Report	Nane 29'	Stadium: Toyota Field; Attendance: 5,563; Referee: Brad Jensen

June 25 19	Oakland Roots SC	3–1	Atlanta United 2	Oakland, California
7:00 PM PDT	Johnsen 49'; Karlsson 75', pen.'; Rodriguez 87'	Report	Trager 60'	Stadium: Laney College Football Stadium; Attendance: 3,622; Referee: Corbyn May

July 1 20	LA Galaxy II	3-1	Oakland Roots SC	Carson, California
7:30 PM PDT	Cabral 51'; Dunbar 56'; Judd 89'	Report	Dennis (yellow card) 40' (yellow-red card) 45'+5'; Azócar 88'	Stadium: Dignity Health Sports Park; Referee: Jervis Atagana

July 9 21	Sacramento Republic FC	3-3	Oakland Roots SC	Sacramento, California
7:30 PM PDT	López 11'; Foster 44'; Fernandes 90'+6'	Report	Azócar 27'; Karlsson 55', 70'	Stadium: Heart Health Park; Attendance: 10,169; Referee: Elton García

July 16 22	Oakland Roots SC	4–0	El Paso Locomotive FC	Oakland, California
7:00 PM PDT	Karlsson 21', 32' (pen.); Formella 34'; Hernández 40'	Report		Stadium: Laney College Football Stadium; Attendance: 4,221; Referee: Lorenzo Hernandez

July 23 23	Oakland Roots SC	0–2	Las Vegas Lights FC	Oakland, California
7:00 PM PDT	Blanchette (red card) 43'	Report	Trejo 53'; Leone 73'	Stadium: Laney College Football Stadium; Attendance: 3,941; Referee: Thomas Snyder

July 27 24	Oakland Roots SC	0–0	Phoenix Rising FC	Oakland, California
7:00 PM PDT		Report	Donasiyano (red card) 90'+4'	Stadium: Laney College Football Stadium; Attendance: 3,336; Referee: Matthew Corrigan

August 13 25	Detroit City FC	1–1	Oakland Roots SC	Hamtramck, Michigan
4:00 PM PDT	Atuahene 87'	Report	Dennis 50'	Stadium: Keyworth Stadium; Attendance: 7,283; Referee: John Griggs

August 24 26	San Diego Loyal SC	1–3	Oakland Roots SC	San Diego, California
7:00 PM PDT	Conway 24'	Report	Azócar 28'; Klimenta 38'; Rito 88'	Stadium: Torero Stadium; Referee: Jose Carlos Rivero

August 27 27	Sacramento Republic FC	1–0	Oakland Roots SC	Sacramento, California
8:00 PM PDT	Donovan 21'	Report		Stadium: Heart Health Park; Attendance: 10,916; Referee: Matthew Conger

September 3 28	Oakland Roots SC	0–2	Phoenix Rising FC	Oakland, California
7:00 PM PDT		Report	Adeniran 5', 85'	Stadium: Laney College Football Stadium; Attendance: 5,093; Referee: Elvis Osmanovic

September 10 29	Phoenix Rising FC	0–2	Oakland Roots SC	Phoenix, Arizona
7:30 PM PDT		Report	Mfeka 5', 27'	Stadium: Phoenix Rising Soccer Complex at Wild Horse Pass; Referee: Brandon Stevis

September 17 30	Oakland Roots SC	1–0	New York Red Bulls II	Oakland, California
7:00 PM PDT	Karlsson 76'	Report		Stadium: Laney College Football Stadium; Attendance: 5,472; Referee: Melvin Rivas

September 24 31	Colorado Springs Switchbacks FC	1–1	Oakland Roots SC	Colorado Springs, Colorado
5:00 PM PDT	Amoh 1', (yellow card) 54' (yellow-red card) 55'	Report	Karlsson 57' (pen.)	Stadium: Weidner Field; Attendance: 8,023; Referee: John Griggs

October 1 32	Oakland Roots SC	2–1	Birmingham Legion FC	Oakland, California
7:00 PM PDT	Karlsson 24'; Azócar 84'	Report	Martínez 21'	Stadium: Laney College Football Stadium; Attendance: 5,509; Referee: Matthew Corrigan

October 8 33	Hartford Athletic	1–3	Oakland Roots SC	Hartford, Connecticut
4:00 PM PDT	Yacoubou 48'	Report	Azócar 4'; Karlsson 59'; Rodriguez 90'+3'	Stadium: Trinity Health Stadium; Attendance: 5,500; Referee: Elvis Osmanovic

October 15 34	Pittsburgh Riverhounds SC	3–1	Oakland Roots SC	Pittsburgh, Pennsylvania
4:00 PM PDT	Sims 45'+1'; Cicerone 54'; Forbes 75'	Report	Azócar 8'	Stadium: Highmark Field; Attendance: 5,182; Referee: Matthew Thompson

===== Playoffs =====
October 23 West	San Diego Loyal SC	0–3	Oakland Roots SC	San Diego, California
5:30 PM PDT	Guido (yellow card) 6' (yellow-red card) 79'; Amang (yellow card) 76' (yellow-red card) 76'; Stoneman (yellow card) 84' (yellow-red card) 88'; Fissore (yellow card) 86'	Report	Nane (yellow card) 15'; Martin (yellow card) 26'; Dennis 36'; Mfeka 53'; Hernández (yellow card) 76'; Barbir (yellow card) 78'; Fissore 90+1'; Klimenta (yellow card) 87'	Stadium: Torero Stadium; Attendance: 5,719; Referee: Elton Garcia

October 28 West	San Antonio FC	3–0	Oakland Roots SC	San Antonio, Texas
7:30 PM CDT	Adeniran 2'; Khmiri (yellow card) 20'; Garcia (yellow card) 56'; Patiño 75', 90'	Report	Barbir (yellow card) 52'; Rodriguez (yellow card) 76'; Rito (yellow card) 89'; Hernández (yellow card) 89'	Stadium: Toyota Field; Attendance: 8,208; Referee: Elvis Osmanovic

=== U.S. Open Cup ===
April 7	Greenville Triumph SC (USL1) (South Carolina)	2–0	(California) Oakland Roots SC (USLC)	Greenville, South Carolina
7:00 pm EDT	Keegan 29'; Smart 90+4'	Report		Stadium: Legacy Early College Field; Referee: Wilmer Soriano
