= 2022 Monterey Bay FC season =

Monterey Bay FC
2022 season
- Owners: Ray Beshoff
- Manager: Frank Yallop
- Stadium: Cardinale Stadium
- USLC playoffs: Did not qualify
- U.S. Open Cup: Round 2
- Top goalscorer: Chase Boone & Sam Gleadle (8)
- Highest home attendance: 5,705 (10/2 vs. TB)
- Lowest home attendance: 2,723 (9/7 vs. OC)
- Average home league attendance: 3,664
- Biggest win: MB 5–0 IND (9/17)
- Biggest defeat: SA 6–0 MB (4/30)
Home colours	Away colours	Third colours

The 2022 Monterey Bay FC season was the club's first season since their establishment on February 1, 2021. The club made its league debut in the USL Championship as well as its domestic cup debut in the U.S. Open Cup.

== Background ==
Monterey Bay FC was established on February 1, 2021, as the result of owner Ray Beshoff retaining USL Championship franchise rights from Fresno FC which folded in 2019. Frank Yallop was initially announced as the team's sporting director on February 1, and on April 12, 2021, he named Ramiro Corrales to the role of Technical Advisor. Yallop and Corrales were named to the roles of manager and assistant-manager respectively on April 22, 2021.

== Season squad ==
Squad No.	Name	Nationality	Position(s)	Date of birth (age)
Goalkeepers
1	Dallas Jaye	(Guam)	GK	June 19, 1993 (age 33)
16	Antony Siaha	(Cameroon)	GK	April 27, 1998 (age 28)
18	Rafael Díaz	(Dominican Republic)	GK	October 8, 1991 (age 34)
21	Carlos Herrera	(United States)	GK	September 12, 1997 (age 29)
Defenders
2	Hugh Roberts (C)	(United States)	CB	September 27, 1992 (age 33)
3	Morey Doner	(Canada)	RB	March 25, 1994 (age 32)
12	Grant Robinson	(United States)	LB	August 15, 1998 (age 28)
27	Hunter Gorskie	(United States)	DF	June 27, 1991 (age 35)
30	Kai Greene	(United States)	CB	July 13, 1993 (age 33)
99	Sam Strong	(United States)	DF	August 23, 1996 (age 30)
Midfielders
6	James Murphy	(United States)	MF	September 17, 1997 (age 29)
7	Adrian Rebollar	(United States)	MF	November 12, 1999 (age 26)
8	Simon Dawkins	(Jamaica)	MF	December 1, 1987 (age 38)
13	Mobi Fehr	(United States)	MF	December 13, 1994 (age 31)
17	Arun Basuljevic	(United States)	MF	December 17, 1995 (age 30)
19	Robbie Crawford	(Scotland)	MF	March 19, 1993 (age 33)
23	Sam Gleadle	(England)	MF	March 20, 1996 (age 30)
77	Jiro Barriga Toyama	(Panama)	MF	April 28, 1995 (age 31)
Forwards
9	Seku Conneh	(Liberia)	FW	November 10, 1995 (age 30)
10	Christian Volesky	(United States)	FW	September 15, 1992 (age 34)
11	Walmer Martinez	(El Salvador)	FW	August 17, 1998 (age 28)
14	Jason Johnson	(Jamaica)	FW	October 9, 1990 (age 35)
15	Chris Cortez	(United States)	FW	July 24, 1988 (age 38)
22	Jesse Maldonado	(United States)	FW	September 1, 2002 (age 24)
31	Chase Boone	(United States)	FW	September 21, 1995 (age 31)

Last updated: July 26, 2022.
Source: Monterey Bay F.C., USL Championship

== Transfers ==
=== In ===
Pos.	Player	Signed from	Details	Date	Source
FW	(El Salvador) Walmer Martinez	(United States) Hartford Athletic	Undisclosed fee	December 22, 2021	
GK	(Guam) Dallas Jaye	(United States) Greenville Triumph	Free transfer	January 19, 2022	
FW	(United States) Chase Boone	(United States) San Diego Loyal SC	Free transfer	January 27, 2022	
FW	(Liberia) Seku Conneh	(Iceland) ÍBV	Free transfer	February 2, 2022	
FW	(United States) Christian Volesky	(Iceland) Keflavík ÍF	Free transfer	February 2, 2022	
GK	(Dominican Republic) Rafael Díaz	(United States) Sacramento Republic FC	Free transfer	February 4, 2022	
FW	(United States) Christopher Cortez	(United States) Miami FC	Free transfer	February 4, 2022	
DF	(Canada) Morey Doner	(Canada) HFX Wanderers FC	Free transfer	February 4, 2022	
DF	(United States) Hugh Roberts	(United States) Charlotte Independence SC	Free transfer	February 8, 2022	
MF	(United States) James Murphy	(United States) Rio Grande Valley FC Toros	Free transfer	February 8, 2022	
MF	(United States) Arun Basuljevic	(United States) OKC Energy FC	Free transfer	February 8, 2022	
DF	(United States) Grant Robinson	(United States) Rio Grande Valley FC Toros	Free transfer	February 10, 2022	
FW	(United States) Jesse Maldonado	(United States) FC Arizona	Free transfer	February 11, 2022	
DF	(United States) Kai Greene	(United States) Oakland Roots SC	Undisclosed fee	February 14, 2022	
MF	(United States) Mobi Fehr	(United States) Las Vegas Lights FC	Free transfer	February 14, 2022	
DF	(United States) Sam Strong	(United States) San Diego 1904 FC	Free transfer	February 14, 2022	
MF	(England) Sam Gleadle	(United States) San Antonio FC	Free transfer	February 23, 2022	
MF	(Panama) Jiro Barriga Toyama	(United States) Forward Madison FC	Free transfer	March 1, 2022	
MF	(United States) Adrian Rebollar	(United States) Cal State Monterey Bay Otters	Free transfer	March 11, 2022	
MF	(Jamaica) Simon Dawkins	(England) Ipswich Town	Free transfer	March 15, 2022	
MF	(Scotland) Robbie Crawford	(United States) Charleston Battery	Free transfer	April 1, 2022	
GK	(United States) Carlos Herrera	(United States) Laredo Heat	25 Day Contract	April 14, 2022	
GK	(United States) Carlos Herrera	(United States) Laredo Heat	Contract extended	May 6, 2022	
GK	(United States) Antony Siaha	(United States) San Diego Loyal SC	Free transfer	May 20, 2022	
FW	(Jamaica) Jason Johnson	(United States) FC Tulsa	Free transfer	July 1, 2022	
DF	(United States) Hunter Gorskie	(United States) Orange County SC	Free transfer	July 8, 2022	

=== Loans out ===
Date from	Position	Nationality	Player	To	Date until	Ref.
July 22, 2022	DF	(United States)	Sam Strong	(United States) Central Valley Fuego FC	End of season	

=== Transfers out ===
Date	Pos.	Player	To	Details	Ref.
July 21, 2022	MF	(Scotland) Robbie Crawford	(United States) Charleston Battery	Undisclosed fee	
July 24, 2022	GK	(Guam) Dallas Jaye	Retired		

== Competitions ==
=== Friendlies ===
February 10, 2022 Preseason	San Jose Earthquakes	4–2	Monterey Bay FC	San Jose, California
11:00am PST	J. López; Cowell; Ebobisse	Report	Boone; Volesky	Stadium: PayPal Park; Attendance: 0
Note: Closed door scrimmage

February 18, 2022 Preseason	San Jose Earthquakes II	0–1	Monterey Bay FC	San Jose, California
		Report	Cortez	Stadium: PayPal Park; Attendance: 0
Note: Closed door scrimmage

March 5, 2022 Preseason	Sacramento Republic FC	3–2	Monterey Bay FC	Sacramento, California
1:00pm PST	López 11'; Cuello 32'; Martínez 50' (pen.)	Report	Boone 43'; Gleadle 63'	Stadium: Heart Health Park

=== USL Championship ===
==== Western Conference ====
Pos	Team	Pld	W	L	T	GF	GA	GD	Pts
9	Las Vegas Lights FC	34	12	13	9	40	50	−10	45
10	Phoenix Rising FC	34	12	16	6	50	58	−8	42
11	LA Galaxy II	34	11	16	7	53	63	−10	40
12	Monterey Bay FC	34	12	18	4	42	59	−17	40
13	Orange County SC	34	7	14	13	49	59	−10	34

Source: USL Championship Standings
Rules for classification: 1) head-to-head points; 2) head-to-head goal differential; 3) points-per game within conference; 4) total wins; 5) total goal differential; 6) total goals scored; 7) points earned against top four Conference finishers; 8) disciplinary points; 9) coin toss or drawing of lots

Overall								Home						Away					
Pld	W	D	L	GF	GA	GD	Pts	W	D	L	GF	GA	GD	W	D	L	GF	GA	GD
34	12	4	18	43	63	−20	40	8	3	6	27	20	+7	4	1	12	16	43	−27

Source: Match reports

==== Results by round ====
Round	1	2	3	4	5	6	7	8	9	10	11	12	13	14	15	16	17	18	19	20	21	22	23	24	25	26	27	28	29	30	31	32	33	34
Stadium	A	A	A	A	A	A	A	H	H	A	H	H	H	A	H	H	A	H	H	A	H	A	H	A	H	H	H	H	H	A	A	H	A	A
Result	L	L	W	L	L	L	L	W	L	W	W	L	L	L	L	D	W	D	W	W	W	L	W	L	L	W	W	W	D	D	L	L	L	L
Position	8	11	11	11	12	13	13	13	13	13	13	13	13	13	13	13	13	13	13	12	12	12	11	11	12	11	9	9	9	9	9	10	10	12

Updated to match(es) played on September 24, 2022. Source: Match reports
A = Away; H = Home; W = Win; D = Draw; L = Loss

==== Matches ====
March 12, 2022 1	Phoenix Rising FC	4–2	Monterey Bay FC	Chandler, Arizona
6:30 PM PST	Madrid 2'; Hurst 27'; Rodríguez 34'; Quinn 40'; King (yellow card) 60'; Lambert (yellow card) 90+1'	PHX Report; MB Report	Murphy (yellow card) 51'; Conneh 70'; Rebollar 87'	Stadium: Phoenix Rising Soccer Complex at Wild Horse Pass; Attendance: 8,409; Referee: Calin Radosav

March 19, 2022 2	Colorado Springs Switchbacks	1–0	Monterey Bay FC	Colorado Springs, Colorado
5:00 PM PDT	Erdmann (yellow card) 23'; Amoh 40'; Belmar (yellow card) 80'; Lindley (yellow card) 89'	Report	Fehr (yellow card) 35' (yellow-red card) 65'; Robinson (yellow card) 56'; Murphy (yellow card) 70'	Stadium: Weidner Field; Attendance: 5,292; Referee: Brad Jensen

March 26, 2022 3	Oakland Roots	2–3	Monterey Bay FC	Oakland, California
7:00 PM PDT	Karlsson 39' (pen.), 49'; Barbir (yellow card) 66'	Report	Boone 8', 68'; Robinson (yellow card) 56'; Roberts 90'; Basuljevic (yellow card) 90+3'; Murphy (yellow card) 90+4'	Stadium: Laney College Football Stadium; Attendance: 5,508; Referee: DeShun Beard

April 2, 2022 4	Sacramento Republic FC	2–1	Monterey Bay FC	Sacramento, California
7:00 PM PDT	LaGrassa (yellow card) 23'; Keko (yellow card) 58'; López 78' (pen.); Archimède 87' (pen.)	Report	Murphy (yellow card) 54'; Greene (yellow card) 67'; Doner (yellow card) 77'; Boone 90+1'	Stadium: Heart Health Park; Attendance: 10,241; Referee: Malik Badawi

April 9, 2022 5	El Paso Locomotive FC	5–0	Monterey Bay FC	El Paso, Texas
6:30 PM PDT	Fox 19', (yellow card) 54'; Herrera (yellow card) 21'; Gómez 35' (pen.), 47'; Luna 51'; Yuma (yellow card) 64'; Mares 75'	Report	Crawford (yellow card) 9' (yellow-red card) 45+1'; Strong (yellow card) 41'; Conneh (yellow card) 90'	Stadium: Southwest University Park; Attendance: 7,148; Referee: Jervis Atagana

April 16, 2022 6	LA Galaxy II	3–1	Monterey Bay FC	Carson, California
7:30 PM PDT	Salazar 40'; Doyle (yellow card) 55'; Williams 57'; Cobian (yellow card) 84'; Judd 86'	Report	Roberts (yellow card) 54' (yellow-red card) 81'; Conneh 68'; Fehr (yellow card) 84'; Volesky (yellow card) 90+1'	Stadium: Dignity Health Sports Park; Referee: Benjamin Meyer

April 30, 2022 7	San Antonio FC	6–0	Monterey Bay FC	San Antonio, Texas
5:30 PM PDT	Collier 21'; PC 25'; Hernandez 39'; Taintor 76'; Dhillon 83'; Ayimbila 90+2'	Report	Doner (yellow card) 43'; Murphy (yellow card) 65'	Stadium: Toyota Field; Attendance: 6,638; Referee: Katja Koroleva

May 7, 2022 8	Monterey Bay FC	1–0	Las Vegas Lights	Seaside, California
7:00 PM PDT	Martinez 56'; Crawford (yellow card) 45+1'; Basuljevic (yellow card) 90'	Report	Lara (yellow card) 38'; Crisostomo (yellow card) 45+1'; Almaguer (yellow card) 73'; Bjørshol (yellow card) 89'	Stadium: Cardinale Stadium; Attendance: 5,038; Referee: Elijio Arreguin

May 14, 2022 9	Monterey Bay FC	1–2	Rio Grande Valley FC	Seaside, California
7:00 PM PDT	Robinson (yellow card) 11'; Roberts 20'; Martinez (yellow card) 31'; Crawford (yellow card) 32' (yellow-red card) 71'; Conneh (yellow card) 90+3'	Report	Ycaza 42', (yellow card) 45+6'; Coronado 45+2'; Ricketts (yellow card) 70'; Cabezas (yellow card) 90+1'; López (yellow card) 90+6'	Stadium: Cardinale Stadium; Attendance: 3,078; Referee: Michael Radchuk

May 21, 2022 10	Louisville City FC	0–2	Monterey Bay FC	Louisville, Kentucky
4:30 PM PDT	Gonzalez (yellow card) 29'; Dia (yellow card) 68'; McCabe (yellow card) 70'; Charpie (yellow card) 78'	Report	Fehr (yellow card) 55', (goal) 58'; Gleadle 77'; Conneh (yellow card) 90+7'	Stadium: Lynn Family Stadium; Attendance: 10,617; Referee: Nabil Bensalah

May 28, 2022 11	Monterey Bay FC	4–2	Colorado Springs Switchbacks	Seaside, California
7:00 PM PDT	Roberts 44'; Gleadle 52'; Murphy (yellow card) 56'; Rebollar 73'; Boone 90+3'	Report	Barry 53'; Amoh 90+6'	Stadium: Cardinale Stadium; Attendance: 3,359; Referee: Adam Zarrin

June 4, 2022 12	Monterey Bay FC	0–2	Oakland Roots	Seaside, California
7:00 PM PDT	Fehr (yellow card) 72'	Report	Rito 21'; Fissore (yellow card) 23'; Morad (yellow card) 80'; Formella 90+2'	Stadium: Cardinale Stadium; Attendance: 3,517; Referee: Brandon Stevis

June 11, 2022 13	Monterey Bay FC	2–3	San Antonio FC	Seaside, California
3:00 PM PDT	Volesky 18', (yellow card) 52'; Delem 68' (o.g.); Roberts (yellow card) 90+1' (yellow-red card) 90+4'	Report	Dhillon (yellow card) 3', (goal) 43'; Maloney (yellow card) 22'; Strong 39' (o.g.); Delem (yellow card) 60'; Beckford (yellow card) 70'; Patiño 82', (yellow card) 90'; PC (yellow card) 90+1'	Stadium: Cardinale Stadium; Attendance: 3,110; Referee: Ricardo Fierro

June 15, 2022 14	LA Galaxy II	3–2	Monterey Bay FC	Carson, California
7:30 PM PDT	Judd 6', 11', 53'; Drack (yellow card) 42'; Cabral (yellow card) 48'; Barry (yellow card) 67'; Lopez (yellow card) 90+6'	Report	Doner 51'; Rebollar 62'; Fehr (yellow card) 82'; Maldonado (yellow card) 90+2'	Stadium: Dignity Health Sports Park; Attendance: 150; Referee: Adam Kilpatrick

June 25, 2022 15	Monterey Bay FC	1–2	Sacramento Republic FC	Seaside, California
7:00 PM PDT	Volesky (yellow card) 14'; Roberts (yellow card) 20'; Lacroix 33' (o.g.)	Report	Gurr (yellow card) 14'; Foster 74', 76'	Stadium: Cardinale Stadium; Attendance: 3,604; Referee: Elijio Arreguin

July 2, 2022 16	Monterey Bay FC	1–1	New Mexico United	Seaside, California
7:00 PM PDT	Boone 2'; Crawford (yellow card) 64'	Report	Rivas 40'; Seymore (yellow card) 75'; Nava (yellow card) 86'	Stadium: Cardinale Stadium; Attendance: 3,114; Referee: Dejan Susak

July 9, 2022 17	Orange County SC	0–2	Monterey Bay FC	Irvine, California
7:00 PM PDT	McCabe (yellow card) 30'; Villanueva (yellow card) 36'; Skendi (yellow card) 79'; Pedersen (yellow card) 81'	Report	Volesky (yellow card) 14', (goal) 62'; Boone 36'; Crawford (yellow card) 68'; Greene (yellow card) 73'	Stadium: Championship Soccer Stadium; Attendance: 4,008; Referee: Elvis Osmanovic

July 16, 2022 18	Monterey Bay FC	0–0	Detroit City FC	Seaside, California
7:00 PM PDT	Dawkins (yellow card) 64'; Doner (yellow card) 68'; Rebollar (yellow card) 77'; Murphy (yellow card) 90+1'	Report	Diop (yellow card) 74'	Stadium: Cardinale Stadium; Attendance: 3,357; Referee: Mark Allatin

July 23, 2022 19	Monterey Bay FC	2–0	New York Red Bulls II	Seaside, California
7:00 PM PDT	Dawkins 15'; Murphy (red card) 43'; Gorskie (yellow card) 77'; Siaha (yellow card) 88'; Gleadle 89'	Report	Cragwell (yellow card) 66'	Stadium: Cardinale Stadium; Attendance: 3,116; Referee: Katja Koroleva

July 30, 2022 20	Loudoun United FC	0–1	Monterey Bay FC	Leesburg, Virginia
4:30 PM PDT	Diarra (yellow card) 29'; Zanne (yellow card) 40'; Greene (yellow card) 90'	Report	Gorskie (yellow card) 45+1'; Conneh 90+3', (yellow card) 90+4'	Stadium: Segra Field; Attendance: 1,737; Referee: Matt Thompson

August 6, 2022 21	Monterey Bay FC	1–0	El Paso Locomotive	Seaside, California
7:00 PM PDT	Rebollar (yellow card) 60', (goal) 88'; Murphy (yellow card) 60'	Report	Azconar (yellow card) 38'; François (yellow card) 73'; Egiluz (yellow card) 76'; Fox (yellow card) 79'; Gómez (yellow card) 85'	Stadium: Cardinale Stadium; Attendance: 3,328; Referee: Elton García

August 10, 2022 22	San Diego Loyal	1–0	Monterey Bay FC	San Diego, California
7:00 PM PDT	Adams 59' (pen.); Riley (yellow card) 85'; Amang (yellow card) 88'	Report	Maldonado (yellow card) 45+2'; Conneh (yellow card) 55'; Rebollar (yellow card) 89'	Stadium: Torero Stadium; Attendance: 4,114; Referee: Mark Allatin

August 13, 2022 23	Monterey Bay FC	1–0	Sacramento Republic FC	Seaside, California
7:00 PM PDT	Volesky 14', (yellow card) 79'; Fehr (yellow card) 21'; Murphy (yellow card) 89'; Robinson (yellow card) 90+2'	Report	Martínez (yellow card) 50'; Keko (yellow card) 65'; Casey (yellow card) 80'; Bauer (yellow card) 88'	Stadium: Cardinale Stadium; Attendance: 3,618; Referee: Ricardo Fierro

August 20, 2022 24	New Mexico United	2–0	Monterey Bay FC	Albuquerque, New Mexico
6:00 PM PDT	Wehan 38'; Preston 39'; Souahy (yellow card) 45+1'; Hamilton (yellow card) 64'	Report	Boone (yellow card) 74'	Stadium: Isotopes Park; Attendance: 7,414; Referee: Eric Tattersall

August 27, 2022 25	Monterey Bay FC	0–2	LA Galaxy II	Seaside, California
7:00 PM PDT		Report	Harvey (yellow card) 69'; Endoh 74', 90+1'; Cabral (yellow card) 82'	Stadium: Cardinale Stadium; Attendance: 5,077; Referee: Corbyn May

September 3, 2022 26	Monterey Bay FC	3–1	San Diego Loyal	Seaside, California
7:00 PM PDT	Gleadle 45', 88'; Volesky 15'	Report	Moon 19'; Adams (red card) 43'	Stadium: Cardinale Stadium; Attendance: 3,208; Referee: Matthew Thompson

September 7, 2022 27	Monterey Bay FC	1–0	Orange County SC	Seaside, California
7:30 PM PDT	Greene (yellow card) 3'; Fehr (yellow card) 17'; Murphy (yellow card) 38'; Gleadle 51'	Report	Hoffmann (yellow card) 35'; Casiple (yellow card) 59'; Osundina (yellow card) 67'; Scott (yellow card) 67'; Kuningas (yellow card) 84'; Villanueva (yellow card) 84'	Stadium: Cardinale Stadium; Attendance: 2,723; Referee: Brad Jensen

September 17, 2022 28	Monterey Bay FC	5–0	Indy Eleven	Seaside, California
7:00 PM PDT	Boone (yellow card) 28', (goal) 31'; Dambrot 43' (o.g.); Murphy 49'; Gleadle 50'; Volesky 66'; Gorskie (yellow card) 21'	Report	Timmer (yellow card) 40'; Dambrot (yellow card) 55'; Tejada (yellow card) 62'; McQueen (yellow card) 79'	Stadium: Cardinale Stadium; Attendance: 3,804; Referee: Gerald Flores

September 21, 2022 29	Monterey Bay FC	3–3	Phoenix Rising FC	Seaside, California
7:30 PM PDT	Volesky 9', 44'; Robinson 20', (yellow card) 72'	Report	Quinn 15' (pen.), 40' (pen.); Rodríguez (yellow card) 22'; Musa (yellow card) 45'; Njie (yellow card) 49'; Sargis (yellow card) 58'; Lambert (yellow card) 62'; Hurst 75'	Stadium: Cardinale Stadium; Attendance: 3,529; Referee: Malik Badawi

September 24, 2022 30	Miami FC	0–0	Monterey Bay FC	Miami, Florida
4:00 PM PDT	Segbers (yellow card) 11'; Sorto (yellow card) 46'	Report	Martinez (yellow card) 16'; Robinson (yellow card) 41'; Gorskie (yellow card) 86'	Stadium: Riccardo Silva Stadium; Attendance: 1,019; Referee: Jeremy Scheer

September 27, 2022 31	Las Vegas Lights	4–0	Monterey Bay FC	Las Vegas, Nevada
7:00 PM PDT	Traore (yellow card) 17'; Trejo 41', 82'; Keinan 45'; Jennings 67'; Leone (yellow card) 71'; Iskenderian (yellow card) 73'	Report	Dawkins (yellow card) 28'; Martinez (yellow card) 45'	Stadium: Cashman Field; Attendance: 1,011; Referee: John Griggs
Note: The match, originally scheduled for September 10, was postponed due to a waterlogged pitch

October 2, 2022 32	Monterey Bay FC	1–2	Tampa Bay Rowdies	Seaside, California
7:00 PM PDT	Gleadle 22'	Report	Law 49', (yellow card) 87'; Wyke 67'; Castellanos (yellow card) 87'; Fernandes (red card) 90+7'	Stadium: Cardinale Stadium; Attendance: 5,705; Referee: Melvin RIvas
Note: The match, originally scheduled for October 1, was rescheduled due to travel issues stemming from Hurricane Ian.

October 12, 2022 33	FC Tulsa	2–0	Monterey Bay FC	Tulsa, Oklahoma
5:30 PM PDT	Epps 7', 82'	Report	Fehr (yellow card) 45+2'; Gorskie (yellow card) 76'	Stadium: ONEOK Field; Attendance: 5,135; Referee: Natalie Simon
Note: The match, originally scheduled for October 8, was rescheduled after Monterey Bay players voted to postpone during the time of a league investigation into allegations of racial language and gestures following the previous Tampa Bay fixture

October 15, 2022 34	Rio Grande Valley FC	4–1	Monterey Bay FC	Edinburg, Texas
5:30 PM PDT	Pimentel (penalty missed) 6'; Torres 6'; López 32', (yellow card) 47'; Barriga Toyama 60' (o.g.); Nodarse (yellow card) 64'; Ward 90+2'	Report	Gorskie (red card) 5'; Conneh (yellow card) 9'; Barriga Toyama (yellow card) 25'; Rebollar (yellow card) 87'; Maldonado 90+3'	Stadium: H-E-B Park; Attendance: 5,139; Referee: Brad Jensen

=== U.S. Open Cup ===
Monterey Bay FC made their Open Cup debut in the Second Round.

April 6 2nd Round	Bay Cities FC (California)	2–1	(California) Monterey Bay FC	San Jose, California
7:30 pm PDT	Dorwart 55'; Cardona 90+1'	Report	Crawford 87'	Stadium: PayPal Park; Attendance: 1,027; Referee: Turan Özdemir
