= 2021 Sacramento Republic FC season =

Sacramento Republic FC
2021 season
- Owner: Kevin M. Nagle
- Head coach: Mark Briggs
- Stadium: Heart Health Park
- USL Championship: 13th
- USL Playoffs: DNQ
Home colors	Away colors	Third colors

The 2021 Sacramento Republic FC season was the club's eighth season of existence. The club played in the USL Championship (USLC), the second tier of the American soccer pyramid.

== Competitions ==
=== USL Championship ===
==== Table ====
Pos	Div	Team	Pld	W	D	L	GF	GA	GD	Pts
11	PC	LA Galaxy II	32	11	6	15	55	57	−2	39
12	PC	Tacoma Defiance	32	10	9	13	37	41	−4	39
13	PC	Sacramento Republic FC	32	8	12	12	36	42	−6	36
14	MT	Real Monarchs	32	5	7	20	28	56	−28	22
15	PC	Las Vegas Lights FC	32	6	3	23	41	77	−36	21

Source: USL Championship
Rules for classification: 1) points; 2) head-to-head points; 3) head-to-head goal differential; 4) total points earned against in-division opponents; 5) total regular season wins against in-division opponents; 6) total goal differential against in-division opponents; 7) total goals scored against in-division opponents; 8) disciplinary points; 9) coin toss or drawing of lots.

==== Match Results ====
April 30 1	LA Galaxy II	0–1	Sacramento Republic FC	Carson, CA
7:30 PM PDT		Report	Bone 82'	Stadium: Dignity Health Sports Park

May 12 2	Sacramento Republic FC	3–1	Las Vegas Lights FC	Sacramento, CA
7:00 PM PDT	Formella 13'; Bone 66'; Villarreal 72'	Report	Musovski 51' (pen.)	Stadium: Heart Health Park; Attendance: 2,313

May 22 3	Orange County SC	1–0	Sacramento Republic FC	Irvine, CA
7:00 PM PDT	Wehan 33'	Report		Stadium: Championship Soccer Stadium; Attendance: 5,740

May 29 4	Sacramento Republic FC	0–1	Phoenix Rising FC	Sacramento, CA
7:30 PM PDT		Report	Moar 62'	Stadium: Heart Health Park; Attendance: 2,513

April 30 5	Sacramento Republic FC	3–1	El Paso Locomotive FC	Sacramento, CA
7:00 PM PDT				Stadium: Heart Health Park; Referee: Elton García

June 2 6	Sacramento Republic FC	3–3	Oakland Roots SC	Sacramento, CA
7:00 PM PDT	Formella 19'; Iwasa 60'; McCrary 68'	Report	Enríquez 26'; Mbumba 40'; Bokila 66'	Stadium: Heart Health Park; Attendance: 2,513

June 5 7	Sacramento Republic FC	1–3	Orange County SC	Sacramento, CA
8:00 PM PDT	Casey (red card) 52'; Bone 60'	Report	Damus 22'; Markkanen 49'; Iloski 87'	Stadium: Heart Health Park; Attendance: 2,513

June 9 8	Real Monarchs SLC	2–0	Sacramento Republic FC	Herriman, UT
7:00 PM PDT	Iloski 22', 41'	Report		Stadium: Zions Bank Stadium; Attendance: 1,019

June 26 9	Sacramento Republic FC	1-2	Phoenix Rising FC	Sacramento, CA
8:00 PM PDT	Alashe (red card) 38'; Casey 72'	Report	Asanté 31'; Egbo 63'	Stadium: Heart Health Park; Attendance: 7,112

July 3 10	San Diego Loyal SC	1–1	Sacramento Republic FC	San Diego, CA
4:00 PM PDT	Hertzog 62'	Report	Taintor 90'+4'	Stadium: Torero Stadium; Attendance: 4,272

July 7 11	Sacramento Republic FC	0–0	Oakland Roots SC	Sacramento, CA
8:00 PM PDT		Report		Stadium: Heart Health Park; Attendance: 8,118

July 10 12	Sacramento Republic FC	0–2	Orange County SC	Sacramento, CA
8:00 PM PDT	Kibunguchy (red card) 45'+4'; Taintor (yellow card) 48' (yellow-red card) 79'	Report	Wehan 7'; Iloski 37'	Stadium: Heart Health Park; Attendance: 9,316

July 14 13	Las Vegas Lights FC	1–2	Sacramento Republic FC	Las Vegas, NV
7:30 PM PDT	Gaines 74'	Report	Bone 5', 35'	Stadium: Cashman Field

July 24 14	Orange County SC	2–2	Sacramento Republic FC	Irvine, CA
7:00 PM PDT	Damus 32'; Richards 61'	Report	Belmar 23'; Kibunguchy 90'+4'	Stadium: Championship Soccer Stadium; Attendance: 3,121

July 31 15	Sacramento Republic FC	3–1	New York Red Bulls II	Sacramento, CA
7:00 PM PDT	Fernandes 17', 22'; Formella 41'	Report	Rafanello 62'	Stadium: Heart Health Park; Attendance: 9,283

August 5 16	Tacoma Defiance	1–1	Sacramento Republic FC	Tacoma, WA
7:00 PM PDT	Mendoza 82'	Report	Kiesewetter 18'	Stadium: Cheney Stadium; Attendance: 926

August 11 17	Oakland Roots SC	0-0	Sacramento Republic FC	Livermore, CA
7:00 PM PDT		Report		Stadium: Las Positas College; Attendance: 1,799

August 14 18	Sacramento Republic FC	2–1	Las Vegas Lights FC	Sacramento, CA
8:00 PM PDT	Iwasa 48', 72'	Report	Fernandes 20' (o.g.)	Stadium: Heart Health Park; Attendance: 9,329

August 21 19	Phoenix Rising FC	0–0	Sacramento Republic FC	Phoenix, AZ
7:30 PM PDT		Report		Stadium: Phoenix Rising Soccer Complex at Wild Horse Pass; Attendance: 6,740

August 28 20	Sacramento Republic FC	1–3	San Diego Loyal SC	Sacramento, CA
8:00 PM PDT	Iwasa 39' (pen.)	Report	Larraz 3'; Williams 23', 29'	Stadium: Heart Health Park

September 1 21	LA Galaxy II	3–3	Sacramento Republic FC	Carson, CA
7:30 PM PDT	Judd 32', 79'; Hernandez 85' (pen.)	Report	Iwasa 16' (pen.), 89' (pen.); Lacroix 29'	Stadium: Heart Health Park

September 5 22	Las Vegas Lights FC	1–3	Sacramento Republic FC	Las Vegas, NV
7:00 PM PDT	Jaime 12'	Report	Daroma 56' (o.g.); Fernandes 73'; Chavez 88'	Stadium: Cashman Field

September 11 23	El Paso Locomotive FC	2–0	Sacramento Republic FC	El Paso, TX
6:30 PM PDT	Gómez 7'; Borelli 56'	Report		Stadium: Southwest University Park; Attendance: 7,320

September 18 24	Sacramento Republic FC	0–1	San Antonio FC	Sacramento, CA
7:30 PM PDT	Foster (red card) 90'+8'; Belmar (red card) 90'+8'	Report	Ford 74' (red card) 90'+8'	Stadium: Heart Health Park; Attendance: 9,483

September 22 25	Tacoma Defiance	0–1	Sacramento Republic FC	Tacoma, WA
7:00 PM PDT		Report	Formella 78'	Stadium: Cheney Stadium; Attendance: 1,993

September 26 26	Sacramento Republic FC	0–2	LA Galaxy II	Sacramento, CA
2:00 PM PDT		Report	Neal 67'; Dunbar 90'	Stadium: Heart Health Park; Attendance: 9,265

October 2 27	Sacramento Republic FC	3–1	Tacoma Defiance	Sacramento, CA
7:30 PM PDT	Iwasa 8'; Cuello 66'; Fernandes 77'	Report	Villanueva 72'	Stadium: Heart Health Park; Attendance: 9,168

October 6 28	Oakland Roots SC	2–1	Sacramento Republic FC	Oakland, CA
7:00 PM PDT	Amarikwa 10'; Klimenta 63'	Report	Formella 31'	Stadium: Laney College Football Stadium; Attendance: 3,548

October 9 29	San Diego Loyal SC	2–1	Sacramento Republic FC	San Diego, CA
7:30 PM PDT	Guido 54'; Martínez 57'	Report	Formella 30'	Stadium: Torero Stadium; Attendance: 6,000

October 13 30	Sacramento Republic FC	1–1	LA Galaxy II	Sacramento, CA
7:30 PM PDT	Formella 88'	Report	Judd 57'	Stadium: Heart Health Park; Attendance: 8,636

October 17 31	Sacramento Republic FC	0-0	Tacoma Defiance	Sacramento, CA
2:00 PM PDT		Report		Stadium: Heart Health Park; Attendance: 9,983

October 23 32	Phoenix Rising FC	1–1	Sacramento Republic FC	Chandler, AZ
7:30 PM PDT	Kibunguchy 84' (o.g.)	Report	Fernandes 23'	Stadium: Phoenix Rising Soccer Complex at Wild Horse Pass; Attendance: 9,236

October 30 33	Sacramento Republic FC	1–1	El Paso Locomotive FC	Sacramento, CA
7:00 PM PDT	Iwasa 77'	Report	Guido 67'	Stadium: Heart Health Park; Attendance: 9,931
