= 2022 Las Vegas Lights FC season =

Las Vegas Lights FC
2022 season
- Principal Owner: Brett Lashbrook
- Head coach: Enrique Duran
- Stadium: Cashman Field
- USL: Western Conference: 9th
- USL Cup Playoffs: DNQ
- U.S. Open Cup: Second Round
Home colors	Away colors

The 2022 Las Vegas Lights FC season was the club's fifth season, and their fifth season in the United Soccer League Championship (USLC), the second division of American soccer.

During the offseason, the Lights underwent a coaching change after letting go of head coach Steve Cherundolo in January, and replacing him with Enrique Duran as a part of their affiliation with MLS club Los Angeles FC.

== Squad ==
=== Roster ===
As of August 27, 2022

No.	Pos.	Nation	Player
1	GK	MEX	Abraham Romero
2	DF	USA	Julian Gaines
3	DF	SEN	Mohamed Traore
4	DF	USA	Alex Lara
6	MF	USA	Nathan Sepulveda
8	MF	USA	Jorge Almaguer
10	MF	MEX	Danny Trejo
11	MF	SLV	Roberto Molina
12	DF	NOR	Morten Bjørshol
14	FW	ARM	Darón Iskenderian
15	MF	USA	Daniel Crisostomo
17	MF	USA	Christopher Jaime
18	DF	USA	Erik Dueñas
19	FW	MLI	Ladji Mallé
20	MF	SLE	Frank Daroma
21	FW	MEX	Christian Torres
23	MF	USA	Chase Bromstedt
24	DF	USA	Alvaro Quezada
26	FW	USA	Cal Jennings
27	DF	USA	Armando Avila
28	DF	MEX	Tony Leone
30	GK	SLV	Tomas Romero
31	DF	USA	Dylan Presto
33	DF	USA	Cabral Carter
42	DF	ISR	Dekel Keinan
95	FW	MEX	Nathan Ordaz

On loan from MLS affiliate side Los Angeles FC
On loan from the Los Angeles FC academy
On a USL Academy contract

=== Staff ===
Title	Name	Nation
Owner	Brett Lashbrook	United States
Head coach	Enrique Duran	Spain
Assistant coach	Stephen Campos	United States
Goalkeeping coach	Omar Zeenni	United States

== Competitions ==
=== USL Championship ===
==== Standings ====
Pos	Team	Pld	W	L	T	GF	GA	GD	Pts	Qualification
7	Oakland Roots SC	34	11	10	13	51	46	+5	46	Playoffs
8	El Paso Locomotive FC	34	13	14	7	56	52	+4	46	
9	Las Vegas Lights FC	34	12	13	9	40	50	−10	45	
10	Phoenix Rising FC	34	12	16	6	50	58	−8	42	
11	LA Galaxy II	34	11	16	7	53	63	−10	40	

Source: USL Championship Standings
Rules for classification: 1) head-to-head points; 2) head-to-head goal differential; 3) points-per game within conference; 4) total wins; 5) total goal differential; 6) total goals scored; 7) points earned against top four Conference finishers; 8) disciplinary points; 9) coin toss or drawing of lots

==== Match results ====
On January 12, 2022, the Las Vegas Lights released their regular season schedule.

All times are in Pacific Standard Time.

===== March =====
March 13 1	New Mexico United	2–0	Las Vegas Lights FC	Albuquerque, New Mexico
4:00 PM	Swartz 37'; Brett 49'	Report		Stadium: Isotopes Park; Attendance: 11,247; Referee: Gerald Flores

March 19 2	Las Vegas Lights FC	2–1	Phoenix Rising FC	Las Vegas, Nevada
7:00 PM	Trejo 12'; Quezada 68'	Report	Repetto 77'	Stadium: Cashman Field

March 23 3	El Paso Locomotive FC	5–4	Las Vegas Lights FC	El Paso, Texas
6:00 PM	Hinds 59'; Zacarías 65'; Brockbank 70'; Mares 90'+1'	Report	Jennings 53', 56'; Trejo 55', 60'; Gaines 73'; Daroma (red card) 88'	Stadium: Isotopes Park; Attendance: 5,077; Referee: Brandon Stevis

March 26 4	Las Vegas Lights FC	0–1	Memphis 901 FC	Las Vegas, Nevada
7:00 PM		Report	Kelly 51'	Stadium: Cashman Field; Attendance: 5,391; Referee: Kevin Fikar

===== April =====
April 1 5	Charleston Battery	1–2	Las Vegas Lights FC	Mount Pleasant, South Carolina
4:00 PM	Williams 8' (pen.)	Report	Trejo 45'+2', 56'	Stadium: Patriots Point Soccer Complex; Attendance: 2,934; Referee: Sergii Demianchuk

April 9 6	Las Vegas Lights FC	2–3	Colorado Springs Switchbacks FC	Las Vegas, Nevada
2:00 PM	Mahoney 43' (o.g.); Jennings 61'	Report	Amoh 22'; Zandi 70'; Lindley 75'	Stadium: Cashman Field; Attendance: 4,922; Referee: Matthew Conger

April 16 7	Las Vegas Lights FC	1–0	Pittsburgh Riverhounds SC	Las Vegas, Nevada
4:00 PM	Trejo 27'	Report		Stadium: Cashman Field; Attendance: 4,420; Referee: Jervis Atagana

April 23 8	Las Vegas Lights FC	1–1	LA Galaxy II	Las Vegas, Nevada
7:00 PM	Crisostomo 32'	Report	Campbell 74'	Stadium: Cashman Field; Attendance: 8,052; Referee: Calin Radosav

April 30 9	Sacramento Republic FC	1–1	Las Vegas Lights FC	Sacramento, California
7:00 PM	Casey 37'	Report	Molina 17'	Stadium: Heart Health Park; Attendance: 10,078; Referee: Brad Jensen

===== May =====
May 7 10	Monterey Bay FC	1–0	Las Vegas Lights FC	Seaside, California
7:00 PM	Martínez 55'	Report		Stadium: Cardinale Stadium; Attendance: 4,687; Referee: Elijio Arreguin

May 14 11	Las Vegas Lights FC	1–1	Oakland Roots SC	Las Vegas, Nevada
7:00 PM	Lara 24'	Report	Karlsson 3'	Stadium: Cashman Field; Referee: Malik Badawi

May 18 12	Birmingham Legion FC	0–0	Las Vegas Lights FC	Birmingham, Alabama
5:00 PM		Report		Stadium: Protective Stadium; Referee: Benjamin Meyer

May 27 13	Las Vegas Lights FC	0–1	El Paso Locomotive FC	Las Vegas, Nevada
7:00 PM		Report	Solignac (yellow card) 37' (yellow-red card) 44'; Mares 62'	Stadium: Cashman Field; Referee: Mark Allatin

===== June =====
June 3 14	Colorado Springs Switchbacks FC	0–3	Las Vegas Lights FC	Colorado Springs, Colorado
6:00 PM	Amoh 26'; Ngalina 57'; Mahoney 60'	Report		Stadium: Weidner Field; Attendance: 7,650; Referee: Brad Jensen

June 11 15	Las Vegas Lights FC	3–0	Orange County SC	Las Vegas, Nevada
7:30 PM	Skendi 21' (o.g.); Trejo 64'; Jennings 86' (pen.)	Report		Stadium: Cashman Field; Referee: Benjamin Meyer

June 19 16	San Diego Loyal SC	1–2	Las Vegas Lights FC	San Diego, California
3:00 PM	Guido 7'	Report	Jennings 17'; Trejo 68'	Stadium: Torero Stadium; Attendance: 5,124; Referee: Elvis Osmanovic

June 24 17	Las Vegas Lights FC	3–2	Phoenix Rising FC	Las Vegas, Nevada
7:30 PM	Quezada 31'; Jennings 41'; Trejo 75'	Report	Moar 55'; Quinn 79'	Stadium: Cashman Field; Referee: Malik Badawi

===== July =====
July 2 18	Las Vegas Lights FC	0–1	Detroit City FC	Las Vegas, Nevada
7:30 PM		Report	Rutz 63'	Stadium: Cashman Field; Referee: Melvin Rivas

July 17 19	Rio Grande Valley FC Toros	0–1	Las Vegas Lights FC	Edinburg, Texas
4:30 PM		Report	Bjørshol 27'	Stadium: H-E-B Park; Attendance: 5,069; Referee: Gabriele Giusti

July 23 20	Oakland Roots SC	0–2	Las Vegas Lights FC	Oakland, California
7:00 PM	Blanchette (red card) 43'	Report	Trejo 53'; Leone 73'	Stadium: Laney College Football Stadium; Attendance: 3,941; Referee: Thomas Snyder

July 27 21	Las Vegas Lights FC	0–2	San Antonio FC	Las Vegas, Nevada
7:30 PM		Report	Abdul-Salaam (yellow card) 11', (goal) 34'; Patiño (yellow card) 53'; Hernandez (yellow card) 58'; Adeniran 64', (yellow card) 85'	Stadium: Cashman Field; Attendance: 2,762; Referee: Jervis Atagana

July 30 22	Atlanta United 2	1–1	Las Vegas Lights FC	Kennesaw, Georgia
4:30 PM	Chukwuma 25', (red card) 90+1'; Washington (yellow card) 47'	Report	Crisostomo (yellow card) 14'; Jennings 80'	Stadium: Fifth Third Bank Stadium; Attendance: 530; Referee: Alejo Calume

===== August =====
August 6 23	Phoenix Rising FC	0–0	Las Vegas Lights FC	Chandler, Arizona
7:30 PM	Moar (yellow card) 45+5'; Antwi (yellow card) 90'	Report	Almaguer (yellow card) 9'; Iskenderian (yellow card) 53'; Keinan (yellow card) 90+4'; Traore (yellow card) 90+6'	Stadium: Wild Horse Pass Stadium; Referee: Greg Dopka

August 13 24	San Antonio FC	2–0	Las Vegas Lights FC	San Antonio, Texas
6:00 PM	Hernandez 34'; Lara 45+1' (o.g.); Dhillon (yellow card) 53'; PC (yellow card) 90+3'	Report	Lara (yellow card) 45'; Daroma (yellow card) 83'	Stadium: Toyota Field; Attendance: 5,521; Referee: Adam Kilpatrick

August 17 25	Orange County SC	1–1	Las Vegas Lights FC	Irvine, California
7:00 PM	Iloski 10'; Torres (yellow card) 45'+1'; Scott (yellow card) 75'	Report	Jennings 52'	Stadium: Championship Soccer Stadium; Attendance: 3,679; Referee: Melvin Rivas

August 20 26	Las Vegas Lights FC	2–1	Sacramento Republic FC	Las Vegas, NV
7:30 PM	Romero (yellow card) 7'; Torres 22'; Crisostomo (yellow card) 35'; Iskenderian 45+2'; Keinan (yellow card) 64'	Report	Martínez 9' (pen.); Gurr (yellow card) 45'; Lacroix (yellow card) 90'	Stadium: Cashman Field; Referee: Elijio Arreguin

August 27 27	Las Vegas Lights FC	0–5	Rio Grande Valley FC Toros	Las Vegas, NV
7:30 PM	Lara (red card) 14'	Report	Ward (yellow card) 24'; Pinzón 28'; Fjeldberg 36', 51'; Pimental 44'; Ruiz 58'	Stadium: Cashman Field; Referee: Benjamin Meyer

===== September =====
September 3 28	Tampa Bay Rowdies	6–1	Las Vegas Lights	St. Petersburg, FL
4:30 PM	Scarlett 24'; Etou (yellow card) 33'; Fernandes 37', 66'; LaCava 51'; Dos Santos (yellow card) 74', (goal) 87'; Mkosana 90+2'	Report	Crisostomo (yellow card) 1'; Lara (yellow card) 33'; Jennings 60'	Stadium: Al Lang Stadium; Attendance: 4,485; Referee: Thomas Snyder

September 17 29	Hartford Athletic	3–0	Las Vegas Lights FC	Hartford, Connecticut
4:00 PM	Martínez 12', 28'; Oettl (yellow card) 35'; Jadama (yellow card) 72'; Brewitt 79', (yellow card) 80'	Report	Keinan (yellow card) 6'	Stadium: Trinity Health Stadium; Attendance: 5,500; Referee: Mark Allatin

September 24 30	Las Vegas Lights FC	1–2	San Diego Loyal SC	Las Vegas, NV
7:00 PM	Trejo 71'; Jaime (red card) 90'+6'	Report	Vassell 1'; Martin 4'	Stadium: Cashman Field; Referee: Elvis Osmanovic

September 27 31	Las Vegas Lights	4–0	Monterey Bay FC	Las Vegas, Nevada
7:00 PM	Traore (yellow card) 17'; Trejo 41', 82'; Keinan 45'; Jennings 67'; Leone (yellow card) 71'; Iskenderian (yellow card) 73'	Report	Dawkins (yellow card) 28'; Martinez (yellow card) 45'	Stadium: Cashman Field; Attendance: 1,011; Referee: John Griggs
Note: The match, originally scheduled for September 10, was postponed due to a waterlogged pitch

September 30 32	Las Vegas Lights FC	0–0	New Mexico United	Las Vegas, Nevada
7:00 PM	Crisostomo (yellow card) 7'; Traore (yellow card) 34'; Lara (yellow card) 47'; Trejo (yellow card) 53'; Dueñas (yellow card) 65'; Keinan (red card) 89'	Report	Seymore (yellow card) 85'	Stadium: Cashman Field; Referee: Malik Badawi

===== October =====
October 8 33	Las Vegas Lights FC	3–2	Miami FC	Las Vegas, Nevada
7:00 PM	Antonelli 31' (o.g.); Crisostomo (yellow card) 40', (goal) 66'; Jennings 78'. (yellow card) 85'	Report	Pérez (yellow card) 29'; Rivas 69'; Valot 84'; Segbers (yellow card) 90'	Stadium: Cashman Field; Attendance: 3,719; Referee: Elton García

October 15 34	LA Galaxy II	1–1	Las Vegas Lights FC	Carson, California
7:30 PM	Lambe (yellow card) 12'; Dunbar 15'; Tellez (yellow card) 22'; Saldana (yellow card) 54'	Report	Trejo 33'	Stadium: Dignity Health Sports Park; Referee: Greg Dopka

=== U.S. Open Cup ===
As a member of the USL Championship, the Las Vegas Lights entered the U.S. Open Cup in the Second Round, matched up against third-division side FC Tucson of the USL League One. Away from home, the club lost 3–2 in Tucson.

April 6	FC Tucson (USL1) (Arizona)	3–2	(Nevada) Las Vegas Lights FC (USLC)	Tucson, Arizona
7:30 pm MST	Crull 45'; Romero 71' (o.g.); Allen 77'	Report	Traore 66'; Crisostomo 80'	Stadium: Kino North Stadium; Referee: Benjamin Davis
