= Soya Takahashi =

Japanese footballer

Personal information
- Full name: Soya Takahashi
- Date of birth: February 29, 1996 (age 30)
- Place of birth: Matsue, Shimane, Japan
- Height: 1.70 m (5 ft 7 in)
- Positions: Full-back; left midfielder

Team information
- Current team: Umeå FC

Youth career
- 2011–2013: Rissho Shonan High School

Senior career*
| Years | Team | Apps | (Gls) |
| 2014–2019 | Sanfrecce Hiroshima | 23 | (0) |
| 2014–2015 | → J.League U-22 (loan) | 19 | (0) |
| 2018 | → Fagiano Okayama (loan) | 4 | (0) |
| 2019 | AFC Eskilstuna | 8 | (0) |
| 2020 | Umeå FC | 22 | (1) |
| 2021 | Oakland Roots | 27 | (0) |

International career
| 2015 | Japan U22 | 1 | (0) |
Medal record
Sanfrecce Hiroshima
| Winner | J1 League | 2015 |
| Runner-up | J1 League | 2018 |
| Runner-up | J.League Cup | 2014 |
- * Club domestic league appearances and goals as of 8 November 2021

Soya Takahashi (高橋 壮也, Takahashi Sōya; born February 29, 1996 in Shimane) is a Japanese footballer who last played as a full-back or left midfielder.

== Playing career ==
Soya Takahashi joined J1 League champions Sanfrecce Hiroshima in 2014.

In March 2021, Takahashi joined Oakland Roots SC in the USL Championship.

== Club statistics ==
As of 22 February 2019

| Club performance | | | League | | Cup | | League Cup | | Continental | | Total | |
| Season | Club | League | Apps | Goals | Apps | Goals | Apps | Goals | Apps | Goals | Apps | Goals |
| Japan | | | League | | Emperor's Cup | | J. League Cup | | AFC | | Total | |
|---|---|---|---|---|---|---|---|---|---|---|---|---|
| 2014 | Sanfrecce Hiroshima | J1 League | 0 | 0 | 0 | 0 | 0 | 0 | 0 | 0 | 0 | 0 |
| 2015 | Sanfrecce Hiroshima | J1 League | 0 | 0 | 1 | 0 | 4 | 0 | – | | 5 | 0 |
| 2016 | Sanfrecce Hiroshima | J1 League | 2 | 0 | 0 | 0 | 0 | 0 | – | | 2 | 0 |
| 2017 | Sanfrecce Hiroshima | J1 League | 21 | 0 | 0 | 0 | 0 | 0 | – | | 21 | 0 |
| 2018 | Fagiano Okayama | J2 League | 4 | 0 | 0 | 0 | – | | – | | 4 | 0 |
| United States | | | League | | US Open Cup | | | | CONCACAF | | Total | |
| 2021 | Oakland Roots | USL Championship | 21 | 0 | – | | | | – | | 21 | 0 |
| Career total | | | 27 | 0 | 1 | 0 | 4 | 0 | 0 | 0 | 32 | 0 |
