= Zeus de la Paz =

Footballer (born 1995)

Personal information
- Full name: Zeus Chandi de la Paz
- Date of birth: 11 March 1995 (age 31)
- Place of birth: Nijmegen, Netherlands
- Height: 1.88 m (6 ft 2 in)
- Position: Goalkeeper

Youth career
- Quick 1888
- 2007–2013: PSV

Senior career*
Years	Team	Apps	(Gls)
2013–2015	Jong PSV	2	(0)
2015–2016	Nuneaton Town	0	(0)
2017	Cincinnati Dutch Lions	14	(0)
2018–2020	Oldham Athletic	26	(0)
2021	Oakland Roots	6	(0)

International career
2012–2013	Curaçao U20	8	(0)
2015–	Curaçao	3	(0)
- * Club domestic league appearances and goals as of 8 November 2021

Zeus Chandi de la Paz (born 11 March 1995) is a Curaçaoan professional footballer who last played as a goalkeeper for USL Championship side Oakland Roots SC.

== Club career ==
De la Paz played in England for Nuneaton Town and in the US with fourth-tier side Cincinnati Dutch Lions, before signing for Oldham Athletic in the January 2018 transfer window.

In February 2021, USL Championship club the Oakland Roots announced they had signed de la Paz to a contract.

== International career ==
Born in the Netherlands, de la Paz represents the Curaçao national team.

== Honours ==
Curaçao

- King's Cup: 2019
