= Yohannes Harish =

Eritrean association football player

Personal information
- Full name: Yohannes Harish
- Date of birth: 19 April 1993 (age 33)
- Place of birth: Eritrea
- Height: 5 ft 8 in (1.73 m)
- Position: Midfielder

Youth career
- SWB Oakland

College career
Years	Team	Apps	(Gls)
2014–2017	Holy Names Hawks	61	(4)

Senior career*
Years	Team	Apps	(Gls)
2018–2019	San Francisco Glens	15	(1)
2019–2021	Oakland Roots	19	(1)
- * Club domestic league appearances and goals

Yohannes Harish (born 19 April 1993) is an Eritrean professional footballer who plays as a midfielder.

== Career ==
Born in Eritrea, Harish moved to the United States and settled in Oakland, California at the age of 14. After arriving in the country, Harish joined Soccer Without Borders Oakland (SWB Oakland) where he learned English while attending Oakland International High School. In 2013, Harish was accepted to Holy Names University and played college soccer with the Holy Names Hawks from 2014 through 2017. He played 61 games for the Hawks across four seasons, with 4 goals. He also captained the side for his junior and senior seasons.

In 2018, Harish joined Premier Development League side San Francisco Glens, playing in seven matches through the 2018 season. He made his debut for the club on 5 May against Santa Cruz Breakers, starting in the 1–0 defeat. Harish played again with the Glens for the 2019 USL League Two season where he was eventually named captain.

=== Oakland Roots ===
In July 2019, it was reported that Harish had joined National Independent Soccer Association club Oakland Roots. He made his debut for the club on 28 September 2019 against San Diego 1904, coming on as an 84th-minute substitute in the 4–3 defeat.

Following the club's move to the USL Championship, Harish was re-signed by Oakland Roots. In the club's opening match of the season on 8 May 2021 against Phoenix Rising, Harish came on as a 63rd-minute substitute in the 3–0 defeat.

== Career statistics ==
As of match played 9 November 2021

Appearances and goals by club, season and competition
Club	Season	League			National Cup		Continental		Total	
Club	Season	Division	Apps	Goals	Apps	Goals	Apps	Goals	Apps	Goals
Oakland Roots	2019–20	National Independent Soccer Association	3	0	—		—		3	0
Oakland Roots	2020–21	National Independent Soccer Association	4	0	2	0	—		6	0
Oakland Roots	2021	USL Championship	12	1	0	0	—		12	1
Oakland Roots	Total		19	1	2	0	0	0	21	1
Career total			19	1	2	0	0	0	21	1

== Personal life ==
Harish's mother moved to the United States when he was five years old. He was reunited with her only 11 years later when he moved to Oakland, California. Harish is also a volunteer coach with Soccer Without Borders Oakland. In matches, Harish wears the number 91 in honor of Eritrean independence, declared in 1991.
