= Ariel Mbumba =

Congolese footballer

Personal information
- Full name: Ariel Mbumba
- Date of birth: 24 September 2001 (age 25)
- Place of birth: Kinshasa, DR Congo
- Height: 5 ft 8 in (1.73 m)
- Position: Midfielder

Team information
- Current team: The Town FC
- Number: 74

Youth career
- 2015: San Jose Earthquakes
- 2015–2018: Silicon Valley SA
- 2018: Portland Timbers
- 2018–2020: De Anza Force

Senior career*
Years	Team	Apps	(Gls)
2020–2022	Oakland Roots	32	(3)
2022–2023	Columbus Crew 2	4	(0)
2024	Spokane Velocity	11	(0)
2025–	The Town FC	1	(0)
- * Club domestic league appearances and goals as of November 24, 2024

Ariel Mbumba (born 24 September 2001) is a Congolese professional footballer who plays as a midfielder for MLS Next Pro club The Town FC.

== Early life ==
Mbumba was born in Kinshasa, Mbumba moved with his family to San Jose in the United States.

== Club career ==
Mbumba joined the youth setup of Major League Soccer club San Jose Earthquakes in 2015 before joining Silicon Valley Soccer Academy, then Juventus Sport Club later that year. He stayed with Silicon Valley SA until 2018 when he briefly joined the Portland Timbers youth academy. He then returned to the Bay Area and joined De Anza Force.

=== Oakland Roots ===
Mbumba joined National Independent Soccer Association club Oakland Roots prior to the 2020 Spring Season and played in their opening match against Chattanooga FC. He came on as a substitute in the 1–1 draw. Following the club's move to the USL Championship, Mbumba was re-signed prior to the 2021 season. In the club's opening match of the season on 8 May 2021 against Phoenix Rising, Mbumba came on as a 78th-minute substitute in the 3–0 defeat.

On 2 June 2021, Mbumba scored his first goal for Oakland Roots during their 3–3 draw against Sacramento Republic.

=== Columbus Crew 2 ===
Mbumba transferred to MLS Next Pro side Columbus Crew 2 on August 12, 2022. Mbumba was the last remaining player on Roots SC from their first season.

=== Spokane Velocity FC ===
Mbumba joined the USL League One team, Spokane Velocity, for its inaugural season in April 2024. Spokane opted not to renew his contract following their 2024 season.

== Career statistics ==
As of match played 2 June 2021

Appearances and goals by club, season and competition
Club	Season	League			National Cup		Continental		Total	
Club	Season	Division	Apps	Goals	Apps	Goals	Apps	Goals	Apps	Goals
Oakland Roots	2019–20	National Independent Soccer Association	2	0	—		—		2	0
Oakland Roots	2020–21	National Independent Soccer Association	5	0	2	0	—		7	0
Oakland Roots	2021	USL Championship	3	1	0	0	—		3	1
Oakland Roots	Total		10	1	2	0	0	0	12	1
Career total			10	1	2	0	0	0	12	1
