= José Hernández (footballer, born April 1996) =

Mexican footballer (born 1996)

Personal information
- Full name: José Andres Hernández
- Date of birth: 12 April 1996 (age 30)
- Place of birth: Ixtapan de la Sal, Mexico
- Height: 1.60 m (5 ft 3 in)
- Position: Midfielder

Youth career
- 2012–2015: Real Salt Lake AZ

College career
Years	Team	Apps	(Gls)
2015–2016	UCLA Bruins	41	(16)

Senior career*
Years	Team	Apps	(Gls)
2015	Real Monarchs	2	(0)
2016	Golden State Force	11	(3)
2017–2018	Real Salt Lake	7	(1)
2017–2018	→ Real Monarchs (loan)	28	(3)
2019	LA Galaxy II	30	(3)
2020	OKC Energy	15	(1)
2021–2022	Oakland Roots	51	(4)
2023–2024	Phoenix Rising	57	(2)
- * Club domestic league appearances and goals as of November 15, 2024

José Andres Hernández (born 12 April 1996) is a Mexican professional footballer who plays as a midfielder.

== Career ==
Hernandez spent the last two years of his youth career with Real Salt Lake's youth academy in Arizona. On 5 February 2015, it was announced that Hernandez signed a letter of intent to play college soccer at UCLA. On 22 March, he made his professional debut with RSL's USL affiliate club Real Monarchs SLC in a 0–0 draw against LA Galaxy II.

Hernandez was able to maintain his college eligibility despite appearing for Real Monarchs and on August 29, he made his collegiate debut in the Bruins 1–0 victory over New Mexico.

He also played in the Premier Development League for FC Golden State Force.

On December 21, 2016, Hernandez signed a homegrown player contract with Real Salt Lake.

On February 1, 2019, Hernández joined USL Championship side LA Galaxy II.

On December 19, 2019, Hernández moved to USL side Oklahoma City Energy.

Hernández joined USL Championship side Oakland Roots on January 8, 2021. He left Oakland following their 2022 season. He then signed with Phoenix Rising FC on December 9, 2022.

== Honours ==
Real Monarchs

- USL Championship Regular Season Title: 2017
