= Max Ornstil =

American soccer player

Personal information
- Date of birth: February 24, 1994 (age 32)
- Place of birth: Oakland, California, United States
- Height: 1.83 m (6 ft 0 in)
- Position: Defender

Youth career
- East Bay United Soccer Club
- 2011–2012: De Anza Force

College career
Years	Team	Apps	(Gls)
2012–2015	Santa Clara Broncos	74	(5)

Senior career*
Years	Team	Apps	(Gls)
2013–2014	FC Tucson	10	(1)
2016	Portland Timbers U23s	6	(1)
2017–2020	Portland Timbers 2	65	(4)
2021–2022	Oakland Roots	28	(1)
- * Club domestic league appearances and goals as of October 22, 2022

Max Ornstil (born February 24, 1994) is an American soccer player.

== Career ==
=== Amateur & College ===
Ornstil spent four years playing college soccer at Santa Clara University between 2012 and 2015, where he scored 5 goals in 74 appearances for the Broncos, also tallying 3 assists.

Ornstil also appeared for USL PDL side FC Tucson in 2013 and 2014, and Portland Timbers U23s in 2016 after finishing college.

=== Professional ===
Ornstil signed with United Soccer League side Portland Timbers 2 in March 2017.

On December 1, 2020, Ornstil joined USL Championship side Oakland Roots ahead of the 2021 season. He left Oakland following their 2022 season.

== Personal life ==
He was born and raised in Oakland, California. He went to St. Paul's Episcopal School for elementary and middle school and played for local youth team East Bay United/Bay Oaks.
