= Óttar Magnús Karlsson =

Icelandic footballer

Personal information
- Date of birth: 21 February 1997 (age 29)
- Place of birth: Reykjavík, Iceland
- Height: 1.90 m (6 ft 3 in)
- Position: Forward

Team information
- Current team: Renate
- Number: 9

Youth career
- –2013: Vikingur
- 2013–2016: Ajax

Senior career*
Years	Team	Apps	(Gls)
2013	Vikingur	1	(0)
2015–2016	Ajax	0	(0)
2015–2016	→ Sparta Rotterdam (loan)	0	(0)
2016	Vikingur	20	(7)
2017–2018	Molde	8	(0)
2018	→ Trelleborgs FF (loan)	14	(1)
2018–2019	Mjällby AIF	14	(1)
2019–2020	Vikingur	22	(14)
2020–2024	Venezia	7	(1)
2021–2022	→ Siena (loan)	19	(2)
2022	→ Oakland Roots (loan)	30	(19)
2023	→ Virtus Francavilla (loan)	7	(0)
2023–2024	→ Vis Pesaro (loan)	29	(10)
2024–2025	SPAL	19	(4)
2025–	Renate	31	(11)

International career^{‡}
2013	Iceland U16	3	(2)
2013–2014	Iceland U17	12	(2)
2014–2016	Iceland U19	9	(1)
2016–2018	Iceland U21	14	(4)
2017–	Iceland	11	(2)
- * Club domestic league appearances and goals as of 29 April 2026 ‡ National team caps and goals as of 11 November 2022

Óttar Magnús Karlsson (born 21 February 1997) is an Icelandic professional footballer who plays as a forward for Serie C Group A club Renate and the Iceland national team.

== Club career ==
=== Ajax ===
On 11 July 2013, Óttar signed a three-year contract with Ajax.

==== Sparta Rotterdam (loan) ====
In December 2015, Óttar agreed to join Sparta Rotterdam on loan for the remainder of the 2015–16 Eerste Divisie season.

=== Víkingur ===
Óttar was chosen as the most promising player of the Icelandic 2016 Úrvalsdeild league by players.

=== Molde ===
On 25 November 2016, Óttar signed a three-year contract with Norwegian Tippeligaen side Molde FK.

==== Trelleborgs (loan) ====
In February 2018, Óttar agreed to join Trelleborgs FF on loan for the upcoming 2018 Allsvenskan season.

=== Mjällby AIF ===
On 15 December 2018, it was confirmed that Óttar had signed with Mjällby AIF for two years.

=== Víkingur ===
On 30 July 2019 it was announced that Óttar had signed with Víkingur until the end of the 2021 season.

=== Venezia ===
On 25 September 2020, Karlsson signed a three-year contract with Italian club Venezia.

==== Loan to Siena ====
On 27 August 2021, he joined Siena in the third-tier Serie C on loan.

==== Loan to Oakland ====
On 18 February 2022, Karlsson joined Oakland Roots on loan.

Having scored 19 goals in 30 appearances for the club, he returned to Venice from Oakland following their 2022 season.

==== Loan to Virtus Francavilla ====
On 31 January 2023, Karlsson was loaned to Serie C club Virtus Francavilla until the end of the season.

==== Loan to Vis Pesaro ====
On 1 September 2023, Óttar moved on loan to Vis Pesaro.

=== SPAL ===
On 2 August 2024, Óttar signed a two-season contract with SPAL.

== International career ==
Óttar represented the Icelandic U-16, U-17, U-19 and U-21 teams. He made his debut for the senior team on 10 January 2017 against China in the China Cup.

In 2022, he was called up to the team for international friendlies against South Korea and Saudi Arabia.

== Career statistics ==
=== Club ===
As of match played 3 April 2022

Appearances and goals by club, season and competition
Club	Season	League			National Cup		League Cup		Continental		Other		Total	
Club	Season	Division	Apps	Goals	Apps	Goals	Apps	Goals	Apps	Goals	Apps	Goals	Apps	Goals
Víkingur Reykjavík	2013	1. deild karla	1	0	1	0	4	1	–		–		6	1
Jong Ajax	2013–14	Eerste Divisie	0	0	0	0	–		–		–		0	0
Jong Ajax	2014–15	Eerste Divisie	0	0	0	0	–		–		–		0	0
Jong Ajax	2015–16	Eerste Divisie	0	0	0	0	–		–		–		0	0
Jong Ajax	Total		0	0	0	0	-	-	-	-	-	-	0	0
Sparta Rotterdam	2015–16	Eerste Divisie	0	0	0	0	–		–		–		0	0
Víkingur Reykjavík	2016	Úrvalsdeild	20	7	2	2	0	0	–		–		22	9
Molde	2017	Eliteserien	8	0	2	2	–		–		–		10	2
Trelleborg	2018	Allsvenskan	14	1	0	0	–		–		–		14	1
Mjällby	2019	Superettan	14	1	0	0	–		–		–		14	1
Víkingur Reykjavík	2019	Úrvalsdeild	8	5	2	2	–		–		–		10	7
Víkingur Reykjavík	2020	Úrvalsdeild	14	9	2	0	4	7	1	1	1^{a}	0	22	17
Víkingur Reykjavík	Total		22	14	4	2	4	7	1	1	1	0	32	24
Víkingur Reykjavík	Total for Víkingur Reykjavík		43	21	7	4	8	8	1	1	1	0	51	31
Venezia	2020–21	Serie B	7	1	1	0	–		–		–		8	1
Siena (loan)	2021–22	Serie C	19	2	–		–		–		–		19	2
Oakland Roots (loan)	2022	USL	18	11	–		–		–		–		4	2
Career total			109	28	10	6	8	8	1	1	1	0	129	43

^{a}Appearance in the 2020 Icelandic Super Cup.

=== International ===
Iceland national team
Year	Apps	Goals
2017	3	0
2018	2	1
2019	2	1
2020	2	0
2022	2	0
Total	11	2

Statistics accurate as of match played 11 November 2022

=== International goals ===
Scores and results list Iceland's goal tally first.

No.	Date	Venue	Opponent	Score	Result	Competition
1	11 January 2018	Maguwoharjo Stadium, Sleman, Indonesia	Indonesia Selection	3–0	6–0	Unofficial Friendly
2.	11 January 2019	Khalifa International Stadium, Doha, Qatar	Sweden	1–0	2–2	Friendly

== Honours ==
Víkingur FC

- Icelandic Cup: 2019

Individual

- USL Championship All League Second Team: 2022
