= Julian Chavez (soccer) =

American soccer player

Personal information
- Full name: Julian Chavez
- Date of birth: May 31, 2002 (age 24)
- Place of birth: Sacramento, California, United States
- Height: 5 ft 7 in (1.70 m)
- Position: Midfielder

Youth career
- 2015–2021: Sacramento Republic

Senior career*
Years	Team	Apps	(Gls)
2020–2021	Sacramento Republic	14	(2)
2022	Central Valley Fuego	0	(0)
- * Club domestic league appearances and goals as of October 16, 2022

Julian Chavez (born May 31, 2002) is an American professional soccer player who plays as a midfielder.

== Club career ==
Born in Sacramento, California, Chavez began his career as part of the Sacramento Republic youth academy before signing a USL Academy contract with the club's first team on March 6, 2020. Chavez then made his professional debut on August 9 in a USL Championship match against Portland Timbers 2, coming on as an 83rd-minute substitute for Sam Werner in the 1–0 victory. On September 2, he scored his first professional goal in the 96th minute against the Portland Timbers 2. His goal was the game winner in a 2–1 victory.

In February 2022, Chavez signed with USL League One side Central Valley Fuego ahead of their inaugural season.

== Career statistics ==
=== Club ===
As of match played October 20, 2021

Appearances and goals by club, season and competition
Club	Season	League			National Cup		Continental		Total	
Club	Season	Division	Apps	Goals	Apps	Goals	Apps	Goals	Apps	Goals
Sacramento Republic	2020	USL Championship	5	1	—	—	—	—	5	1
Sacramento Republic	2021	USL Championship	9	1	—	—	—	—	9	1
Career total			14	2	0	0	0	0	14	2
