= Darón Iskenderian =

Armenian footballer

Personal information
- Date of birth: 19 March 2002 (age 24)
- Place of birth: Los Angeles, California, United States
- Height: 5 ft 11 in (1.80 m)
- Position: Attacking midfielder

Youth career
- 2015–2019: LA Galaxy
- 2019: Gavà
- 2019–2020: Real So Cal
- 2020–2022: Barça Residency Academy

Senior career*
Years	Team	Apps	(Gls)
2022–2023	Las Vegas Lights	26	(1)
2023–2024	Real Monarchs	34	(4)

International career^{‡}
2018	Armenia U16	3	(0)
2022–	Armenia U21	7	(0)
- * Club domestic league appearances and goals as of 21 January 2025 ‡ National team caps and goals as of 21 November 2023

Darón Iskenderian (born 19 March 2002) is a professional footballer who plays as an attacking midfielder. Born in the United States, he is a youth international for Armenia.

== Club career ==
Iskenderian played as part of the LA Galaxy academy, before spending a year with Catalan club CF Gavà in their under-19 team. He returned to the United States to play with Real So Cal and later moved to the Barça Residency Academy in Casa Grande, Arizona.

In March 2022, it was announced Iskenderian had signed a USL Academy contract with Las Vegas Lights ahead of their 2022 season. He debuted for the club on 13 March 2022, appearing as a 53rd–minute substitute during a 0–2 loss to New Mexico United.

== Career statistics ==
As of match played 22 October 2022

Appearances and goals by club, season and competition
Club	Season	League			National Cup		Continental		Total	
Club	Season	Division	Apps	Goals	Apps	Goals	Apps	Goals	Apps	Goals
Las Vegas Lights	2022	USL	26	1	1	0	—		27	1
Career total			26	1	1	0	0	0	27	1
