= Morten Bjørshol =

Norwegian footballer (born 1997)

Personal information
- Full name: Morten Lyngstad Bjørshol
- Date of birth: 22 August 1997 (age 29)
- Place of birth: Oslo, Norway
- Height: 1.85 m (6 ft 1 in)
- Position: Defender

Youth career
- –2014: Stabæk

College career
| Years | Team | Apps | (Gls) |
| 2017–2021 | Cal State LA Golden Eagles | 85 | (12) |

Senior career*
| Years | Team | Apps | (Gls) |
| 2015–2017 | Lyn | 16 | (0) |
| 2022 | Las Vegas Lights | 28 | (1) |
| 2023 | Orange County SC | 3 | (0) |
- * Club domestic league appearances and goals as of 17:12, 22 October 2023 (UTC)

Morten Lyngstad Bjørshol (born 22 August 1997) is a Norwegian professional footballer who plays as a defender.

== Career ==
=== Youth ===
Bjørshol played with the academy team at Stabæk until 2014. He subsequently joined Lyn, who he played with for three seasons.

=== College ===
In 2017, Bjørshol opted to move to the United States to play college soccer at California State University, Los Angeles. In four seasons with the Golden Eagles, with the 2020 season cancelled due to the COVID-19 pandemic, Bjørshol made 85 appearances, scoring 12 goals and tallying five assists. At college, Bjørshol earned numerous accolades; earning All-Conference honors every year, All-American honors for his last three seasons, and was named the CCAA Defender of the Year in 2019. He helped the team to consecutive tournament titles in 2017 and 2018

=== Professional ===
On 13 March 2022, signed with USL Championship side Las Vegas Lights. He made his debut for Las Vegas on 19 March 2022, starting against Phoenix Rising.

On March 7, 2023, Bjørshol signed with USL Championship side Orange County SC for their 2023 season.
