= Jesús Enríquez =

American soccer player (born 1997)

Personal information
- Full name: Jesús Orlando Enríquez
- Date of birth: August 16, 1997 (age 29)
- Place of birth: Santa Clara, California, United States
- Height: 1.70 m (5 ft 7 in)
- Position: Winger

Youth career
- Tijuana

Senior career*
Years	Team	Apps	(Gls)
2016–2017	Tijuana	0	(0)
2018–2019	Rio Grande Valley FC	61	(10)
2020	San Antonio FC	3	(0)
2020	Reno 1868	6	(0)
2021–2022	Oakland Roots	44	(4)
2023–2024	Monterey Bay	28	(1)
- * Club domestic league appearances and goals as of August 26, 2024

Jesús "Chuy" Orlando Enríquez (born August 16, 1997) is an American professional soccer player who last played for USL Championship club Monterey Bay FC.

== Career ==
Enríquez played with Club Tijuana, playing for the B-team and appearing on the bench for the first-team in 2016, making the bench in games against Club Atlético Zacatepec and Coras de Tepic. He moved to USL side Rio Grande Valley FC Toros on January 18, 2018.

He made his professional debut on 16 March 2018, playing in a 1–1 draw with Saint Louis FC.

In January 2020, Enríquez joined San Antonio FC. Enríquez and San Antonio mutually agreed to part ways on August 21, 2020.

Following his release from San Antonio, Enríquez signed with Reno 1868 on August 28, 2020. Reno folded their team on November 6, 2020, due to the financial impact of the COVID-19 pandemic.

On December 29, 2020, Enríquez joined USL Championship side Oakland Roots ahead of their 2021 season.

On March 17, 2023, Monterey Bay FC announced that Enríquez joined the California team on a one-year contract for the 2023 season. Initially he left Monterey Bay following their 2023 season, however in January 2024 he was brought back ahead of the 2024 USL Championship season. On August 28, 2024, Monterey Bay announced that the club and Enríquez mutually agreed to part ways.
