= Matías Fissore =

Argentine footballer (born 1990)

Personal information
- Full name: Matías Oscar Fissore
- Date of birth: 21 September 1990 (age 36)
- Place of birth: San Marcos Sud, Argentina
- Height: 1.65 m (5 ft 5 in)
- Position: Midfielder

Senior career*
Years	Team	Apps	(Gls)
2010–2015	Atlético de Rafaela	106	(3)
2015–2019	San Martín SJ	55	(0)
2019–2021	San Martín Tucumán	19	(0)
2021–2022	Oakland Roots	51	(0)
2023–2024	Atlético de Rafaela	62	(0)
2025	Güemes	8	(0)
- * Club domestic league appearances and goals as of 11:27, 23 October 2022 (UTC)

Matías Oscar Fissore (born 21 September 1990) is an Argentine professional footballer.

== Career ==
=== Atletico Rafaela ===
Fissore made his debut for Atlético de Rafaela in 2010 in the Primera B Nacional. Between 2010 and his departure in 2015, Fissore played 106 matches, 71 of which were in the Primera División.

=== San Martin de San Juan ===
In June 2015, Fissore joined San Martín de San Juan on a free transfer.

=== Oakland Roots ===
On 4 March 2021, Fissore joined USL Championship side Oakland Roots. He left Oakland following their 2022 season.

== Honours ==
- Atlético Rafaela 2010-2011 (Primera B Nacional Championship)

== Personal life ==
He is a cousin of the footballer Martín Romagnoli.
