= Dariusz Formella =

Polish footballer

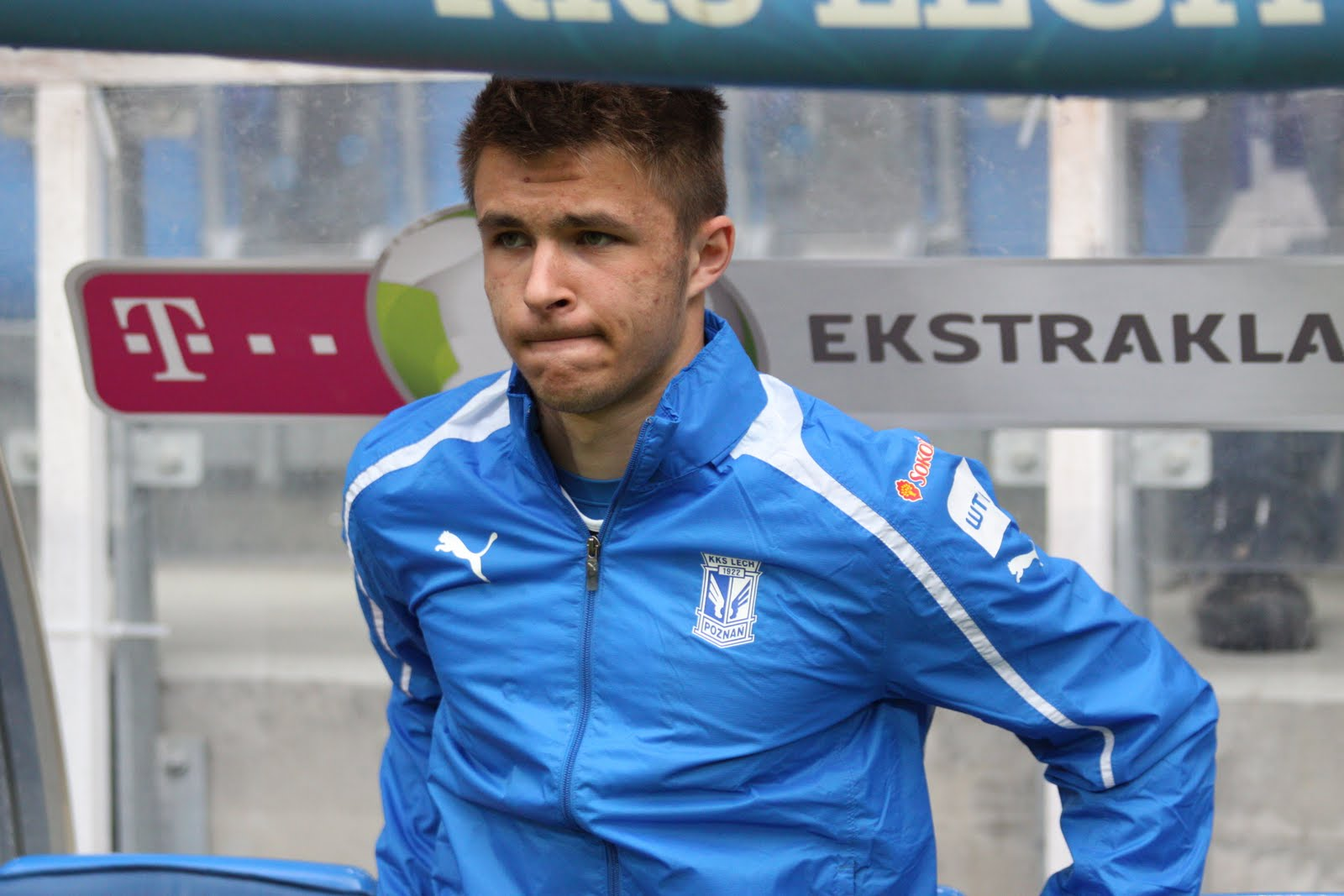
- Formella with Lech Poznań in 2013

Personal information
- Full name: Dariusz Formella
- Date of birth: 21 October 1995 (age 31)
- Place of birth: Gdynia, Poland
- Height: 1.77 m (5 ft 9 1/2 in)
- Positions: Striker; left winger

Team information
- Current team: Salos Rumia

Youth career
- Jedynka Reda
- –2012: Arka Gdynia

Senior career*
Years	Team	Apps	(Gls)
2012	Arka Gdynia II	6	(0)
2012–2013	Arka Gdynia	7	(0)
2013–2018	Lech Poznań	69	(5)
2013–2015	Lech Poznań II	16	(3)
2016	→ Arka Gdynia (loan)	13	(6)
2017	→ Arka Gdynia (loan)	17	(3)
2017	→ Pogoń Szczecin (loan)	18	(2)
2018	→ Raków Częstochowa (loan)	13	(3)
2018–2019	Raków Częstochowa	8	(1)
2019–2021	Sacramento Republic	51	(17)
2022–2023	Oakland Roots	51	(10)
2023–2025	Phoenix Rising	64	(11)
2026–	Salos Rumia	0	(0)

International career
2011	Poland U16	1	(0)
2012	Poland U17	7	(0)
2012–2013	Poland U18	7	(4)
2013–2014	Poland U19	9	(2)
2014–2016	Poland U20	6	(1)
2015–2016	Poland U21	9	(2)
- * Club domestic league appearances and goals as of 11:28, 13 February 2026 (UTC)

Dariusz Formella (born 21 October 1995) is a Polish professional footballer who plays as a striker or left winger for regional league club Salos Rumia.

== Club career ==
On 1 February 2016, Formella was loaned from Lech Poznań to Arka Gdynia on a half-year deal.

On 20 July 2017, he was sent on loan to Pogoń Szczecin.

On 25 January 2018, Formella moved on loan to I liga side Raków Częstochowa. In the summer 2018, he joined the club on a permanent basis. His contract was terminated by mutual consent on 8 May 2019.

=== Sacramento Republic FC ===
On 18 July 2019, Formella signed with Sacramento Republic FC of the USL Championship for the remainder of the 2019 season with a club option for 2020.

== Career statistics ==
As of match played 14 September 2025

Appearances and goals by club, season and competition
Club	Season	League			National cup (Note: Includes Polish Cup, U.S. Open Cup)		Continental		Other		Total	
Club	Season	Division	Apps	Goals	Apps	Goals	Apps	Goals	Apps	Goals	Apps	Goals
Arka Gdynia II	2012–13	III liga, gr. D	6	0	—		—		—		6	0
Arka Gdynia	2012–13	I liga	7	0	0	0	—		—		7	0
Lech Poznań	2012–13	Ekstraklasa	0	0	—		—		—		0	0
Lech Poznań	2013–14	Ekstraklasa	11	0	2	0	2 (Note: Appearances in UEFA Europa League)	0	—		15	0
Lech Poznań	2014–15	Ekstraklasa	28	3	5	3	0	0	—		33	6
Lech Poznań	2015–16	Ekstraklasa	19	1	4	0	12 (Note: Four appearances in UEFA Champions League, eight appearances in UEFA Europa League)	0	1 (Note: Appearance in Polish Super Cup)	0	36	1
Lech Poznań	2016–17	Ekstraklasa	11	1	2	0	—		1	2	14	3
Lech Poznań	Total		69	5	13	3	14	0	2	2	98	10
Lech Poznań II	2013–14	III liga, gr. C	12	3	—		—		—		12	3
Lech Poznań II	2014–15	III liga, gr. C	4	0	—		—		—		4	0
Lech Poznań II	Total		16	3	—		—		—		16	3
Arka Gdynia (loan)	2015–16	I liga	13	6	—		—		—		13	6
Arka Gdynia (loan)	2016–17	Ekstraklasa	17	3	2	1	—		—		19	4
Pogoń Szczecin	2017–18	Ekstraklasa	18	2	2	0	—		—		20	2
Raków Częstochowa (loan)	2017–18	I liga	13	3	—		—		—		13	3
Raków Częstochowa	2018–19	I liga	8	1	1	0	—		—		9	1
Raków Częstochowa	Total		21	4	1	0	—		—		22	4
Sacramento Republic	2019	USL Championship	10	2	0	0	—		2 (Note: Appearances in USL Championship play-offs)	0	12	2
Sacramento Republic	2020	USL Championship	14	8	—		—		1	0	15	8
Sacramento Republic	2021	USL Championship	27	7	0	0	—		—		27	7
Sacramento Republic	Total		51	17	0	0	—		3	0	54	17
Oakland Roots	2022	USL Championship	32	4	1	0	—		—		33	4
Oakland Roots	2023	USL Championship	19	6	2	0	—		—		21	6
Oakland Roots	Total		51	10	3	0	—		—		54	10
Phoenix Rising	2023	USL Championship	13	4	—		—		4	2	17	6
Phoenix Rising	2024	USL Championship	30	6	0	0	—		1	0	31	6
Phoenix Rising	2025	USL Championship	21	1	1	1	—		3 (Note: Appearances in USL Cup)	0	25	2
Phoenix Rising	Total		64	11	1	1	—		8	2	73	14
Career total			333	61	22	5	14	0	13	4	382	70

== Honours ==
Lech Poznań

- Ekstraklasa: 2014–15
- Polish Super Cup: 2015, 2016

Arka Gdynia

- I liga: 2015–16
- Polish Cup: 2016–17

Raków Częstochowa

- I liga: 2018–19

Phoenix Rising

- USL Championship: 2023
