= Emrah Klimenta =

Montenegrin footballer (born 1991)

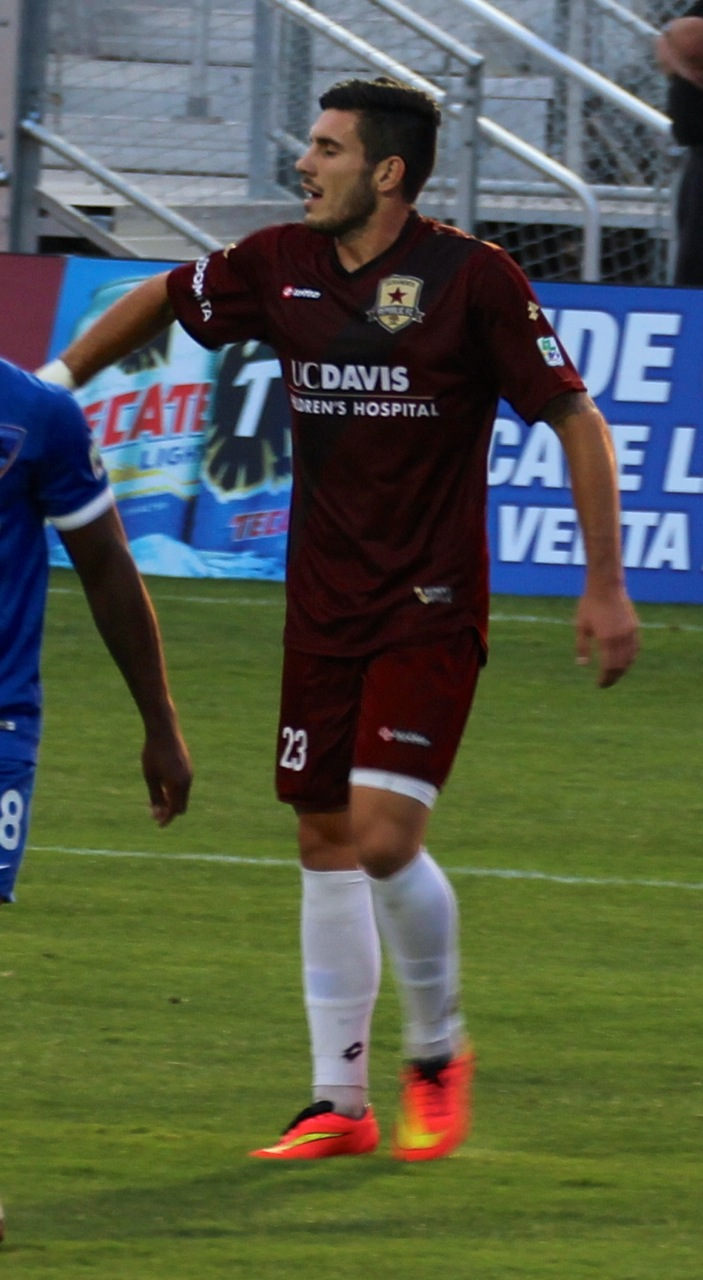

Personal information
- Date of birth: February 13, 1991 (age 35)
- Place of birth: Rožaje, SR Montenegro, Yugoslavia
- Height: 1.84 m (6 ft 0 in)
- Position: Centre-back

Team information
- Current team: Las Vegas Lights
- Number: 21

Youth career
- 1999–2009: ODP Cal North
- 2009: MŠK Žilina
- 2009–2010: FC Ingolstadt 04

Senior career*
Years	Team	Apps	(Gls)
2011–2012	Bay Area Ambassadors	14	(12)
2014–2017	Sacramento Republic	91	(9)
2018	LA Galaxy	2	(0)
2018	→ LA Galaxy II (loan)	2	(0)
2018	Sacramento Republic	11	(0)
2019	Reno 1868	18	(0)
2020	San Diego Loyal	12	(0)
2021–2023	Oakland Roots	81	(4)
2024–	Las Vegas Lights	24	(0)

International career
2016–2018	Montenegro	7	(0)
- * Club domestic league appearances and goals as of November 15, 2024

Emrah Klimenta (Montenegrin pronunciation: [klǐmeːnta]; Albanian: Emrah Kelmendi; born February 13, 1991) is a Montenegrin professional footballer who plays as a centre-back for USL Championship side Las Vegas Lights.

== Early life ==
Emrah Klimenta, whose surname is derived from the Albanian highland tribe Kelmendi was born in Rožaje, Montenegro during a time of turmoil in the Balkan region as the Socialist Federative Republic of Yugoslavia was breaking apart. Klimenta and his parents initially settled in Mainz, Germany. His family then moved to the United States in 1999. They settled in Oakland, California, but later moved to Walnut Creek, California.

== Career ==
=== Club ===
Klimenta began his youth career in the United States, playing as a midfielder and forward. He also played for the Olympic Development Program (ODP) for Cal North.

Klimenta spent time in Europe playing for MŠK Žilina and FC Ingolstadt 04, before returning to California as a midfielder for NPSL club Bay Area Ambassadors.

Klimenta joined United Soccer League club Sacramento Republic FC in March 2014, after being selected during an open tryout. Klimenta played as a defender and has started most of the league games in the 2014, 2015 and 2016 season.

In January 2018 it was announced that Klimenta had signed for LA Galaxy of Major League Soccer, ending his tenure in Sacramento as the team's all-time leader in minutes, starts, and appearances. He was released by the club on June 14, 2018.

Klimenta returned to Sacramento Republic FC for the remainder of the 2018 season.

On 4 April 2019, Klimenta joined USL side Reno 1868.

On 5 June 2021, Klimenta joined USL Championship club Oakland Roots SC. After three seasons with the club, he was not re-signed for the 2024 season.

Klimenta moved to the USL Championship side Las Vegas Lights on 13 February 2024.

=== International ===
In May 2016, Klimenta was called up for to the Montenegro national team for the first time for a training camp and friendly against Turkey on 29 May. On this day, Emrah made his senior debut. In the process, he became the first Sacramento Republic player to receive a senior call-up while with the club.

== Honors ==
Sacramento Republic

- USL Championship: 2014
