= Preston Judd =

American soccer player (born 1999)

Personal information
- Date of birth: May 28, 1999 (age 27)
- Place of birth: Las Vegas, Nevada, United States
- Height: 6 ft 3 in (1.91 m)
- Position: Forward

Team information
- Current team: San Jose Earthquakes
- Number: 19

Youth career
- Las Vegas Soccer Academy

College career
Years	Team	Apps	(Gls)
2017–2018	California Baptist Lancers	39	(22)
2019–2020	Denver Pioneers	19	(7)

Senior career*
Years	Team	Apps	(Gls)
2021	Sporting Kansas City II	0	(0)
2021–2023	LA Galaxy II	57	(30)
2022–2023	LA Galaxy	17	(3)
2024–	San Jose Earthquakes	70	(19)
- * Club domestic league appearances and goals as of May 24, 2026

Preston Judd (born May 28, 1999) is an American professional soccer player who plays as a forward for Major League Soccer club San Jose Earthquakes.

== Early career ==
Judd was part of the Las Vegas Sports Academy.

In 2017, Judd went to play college soccer at California Baptist University. In two years with the Lancers, Judd made 39 appearances, scoring 22 goals and tallying 4 assists. In his Freshman season he took Academic All-PacWest honors, and in his Sophomore season was named first-team All-WAC and second-team All-Far West Region, as well as to the WAC All-Academic team.

In 2019, Judd transferred to the University of Denver where he played a single season, scoring 7 goals and tallying 1 assist for the Pioneers. Judd was a 2019 Summit League All-Newcomer Team and was the 2019 Summit League Tournament MVP.

== Professional career ==
On January 13, 2021, Judd signed with USL Championship side Sporting Kansas City II. Judd had attended Kansas City's 2020 College Invitational Combine, for players who had missed the 2020 season due to the COVID-19 pandemic.

On January 21, 2021, Judd was selected 35th overall in the 2021 MLS SuperDraft by LA Galaxy.

On April 7, 2021, it was announced Judd had signed with LA Galaxy II. On April 16, 2021, Sporting Kansas City confirmed they had agreed to terminate Judd's contract with the club to allow him to sign with the side who drafted him.

Judd made his professional debut on April 30, 2021, starting in a 1–0 loss to Sacramento Republic. Judd scored his first professional goal on May 5, 2021, netting a 90th-minute goal to complete a 5–0 win over Las Vegas Lights. On June 16, 2021, Judd netted his first career hat-trick, scoring all three LA Galaxy II goals in a 4–3 loss to Las Vegas Lights.

On April 4, 2022, Judd moved to the LA Galaxy roster.

On 14 December 2023, Judd joined San Jose Earthquakes in exchange for $200,000 of future General Allocation Money.
