= Laney College Football Stadium =

Multi-purpose stadium

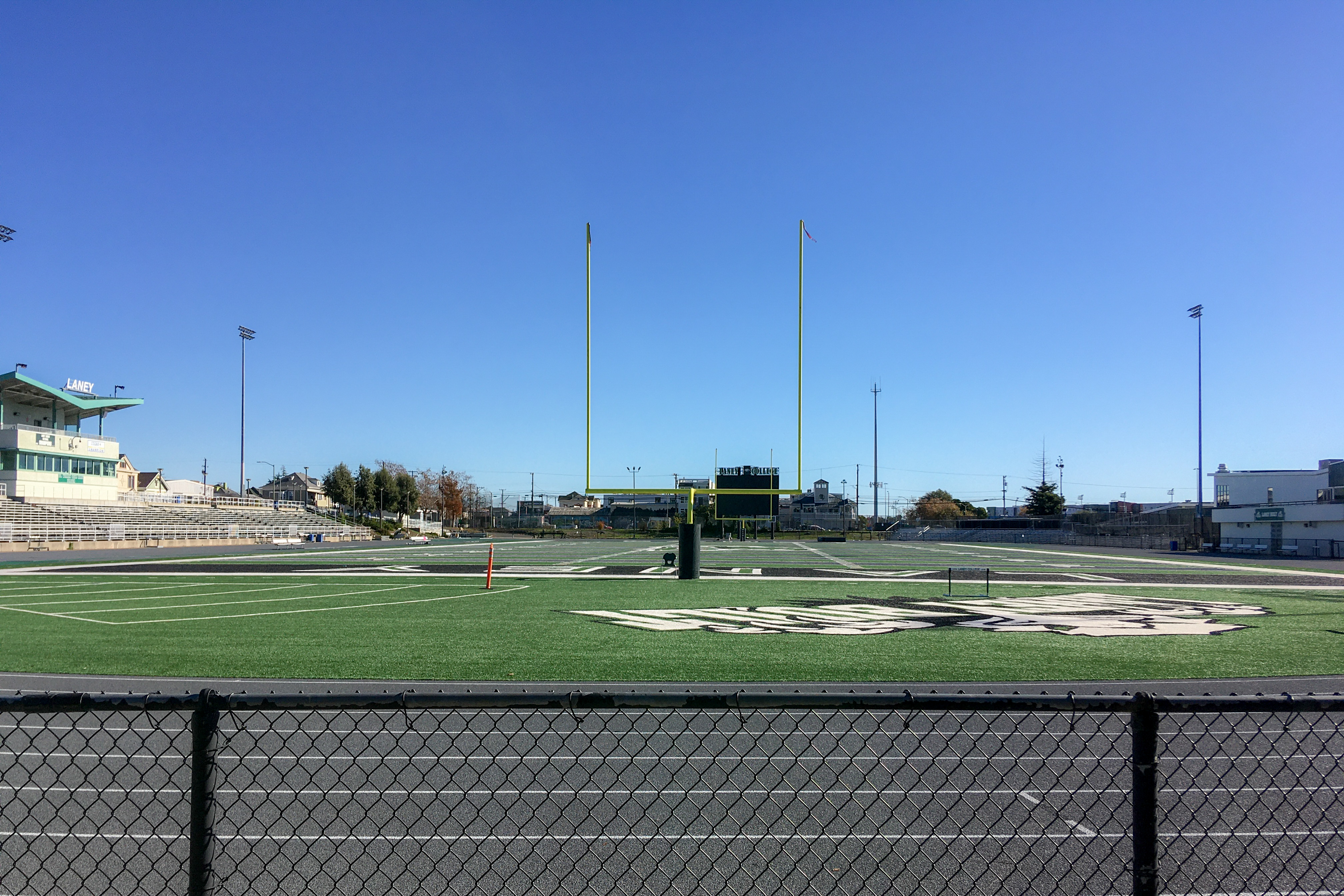
- Interactive map of Laney College Football Stadium
- Location: 8th Street and 5th Avenue; Oakland, CA 94607
- Coordinates: 37.7945°N 122.2587°W
- Owner: Laney College
- Capacity: 5,500
- Surface: Natural grass
- Public transit: Lake Merritt

Tenants
- Laney Eagles (CCCAA); Oakland Roots SC (USLC) (2019–present)

Laney College Football Stadium is a multi-purpose stadium located on the Laney College campus in Oakland, California, on the former site of Frank Youell Field. Also known as Dr. Bill Riley Stadium, the stadium is home to Stan Peters Field. It is owned and operated by Laney College and is the home field of the Laney Eagles track & field and football teams, both of which are part of the California Community College Athletic Association (CCCAA). The stadium was also the home field of the Oakland Roots SC soccer team of the USL Championship. For Roots games, the pitch is widened using a modular turf system. The stadium has room for up to 5,500+ with standing room.

== Notable events ==
Date	Match-up	Score	Attendance	Source
September 8, 2019	Oakland Roots SC vs (Mexico) FC Juárez	2–4	(Note: Described as a "sell-out" but no official total available)	
October 13, 2019	Oakland Roots SC vs (Mexico) Club Atlético Zacatepec	2–0		
