= 2025 El Paso Locomotive FC season =

El Paso Locomotive FC
2025 season
- Head coach: Wílmer Cabrera
- Stadium: Southwest University Park, El Paso, TX
- USLC: Western Conference: 4th
- USL Cup Playoffs: Conference Quarterfinals
- 2025 U.S. Open Cup: Round of 32
- USL Cup: Group Stage
- Copa Tejas Division II: 2nd
- Copa Tejas Shield: 3rd
- Top goalscorer: League: (Colombia) Andy Cabrera (10 goals); All: (Colombia) Andy Cabrera (13 goals)
- Highest home attendance: 8,432
- Lowest home attendance: 1,565
- Average home league attendance: 5,194
- Biggest win: ELP 6–0 LAS (8/2) (USLC); ELP 5–1 HFC (3/19) (USOC); OMA 0–1 ELP (7/26) (USL Cup)
- Biggest defeat: 3 matches by 3 goals (USLC); ATX 3–2 ELP (5/7) (USOC); ELP 0–1 COS (5/31) (USL Cup)
Home colors	Away colors
- All statistics correct as of 15:46, October 26, 2025 (UTC).

The 2025 El Paso Locomotive FC season will be the seventh season for El Paso Locomotive FC in the USL Championship, the second tier of professional soccer in the United States.

== Staff ==
As of September 21, 2024

Position	Name
Head coach	(Colombia) Wílmer Cabrera
Technical Director	(United States) Ray Saari
Assistant coach	(United States) Gianluca Masucci
Assistant coach	(Colombia) Gerson Echeverry
Goalkeeping coach	(United States) Matt Dabrowski
Coordinator, equipment and player operations	(United States) Saul Soto

== Roster ==
As of July 21, 2025

No.	Pos.	Player	Nation
1	GK	USA	Sebastián Mora
3	DF	GHA	Wahab Ackwei
5	DF	MEX	Tony Alfaro
6	MF	SLV	Eric Calvillo
7	DF	USA	Bryan Romero
8	MF	SLE	Frank Daroma
9	FW	CUB	Frank López
10	FW	SLV	Amando Moreno
11	FW	USA	Christian Sorto
12	MF	USA	Ricky Ruiz
13	FW	COL	Andy Cabrera
14	FW	USA	Beto Avila
15	DF	DOM	Noah Dollenmayer
16	DF	BRA	Gabi Torres
18	DF	USA	Alvaro Quezada
19	GK	MEX	Marco Canales
21	DF	GHA	Kofi Twumasi
23	GK	JAM	Jahmali Waite
24	DF	USA	Memo Diaz
25	DF	MEX	Arturo Ortiz
28	FW	USA	Omar Mora
29	DF	USA	Kenneth Hoban
30	MF	USA	Robert Coronado
31	FW	USA	Mario Rodriguez
50	FW	USA	Axel Valdivia
66	DF	USA	Raul Vazquez

Notes

1. USL Academy contract

== Transfers ==
=== In ===
Date	No.	Pos.	Player	From	Fee	Source
November 25, 2024	25	DF	(Mexico) Arturo Ortiz	(Mexico) FC Juárez		
December 9, 2024	29	DF	(United States) Kenneth Hoban	(United States) El Paso Locomotive Academy		
December 10, 2024	28	FW	(United States) Omar Mora	(United States) Oral Roberts University		
December 11, 2024	24	DF	(United States) Memo Diaz	(United States) Oakland Roots		
December 18, 2024	18	DF	(United States) Alvaro Quezada	(United States) Memphis 901 FC		
January 13, 2025	1	GK	(United States) Sebastián Mora	(Mexico) Celaya		
January 22, 2025	9	FW	(Cuba) Frank López	(United States) Miami FC		
February 18, 2025	14	FW	(United States) Beto Avila	(United States) Sporting Kansas City II		
February 19, 2025	21	MF	(Ghana) Kofi Twumasi	(United States) Rhode Island FC		
March 7, 2025		GK	(Mexico) Marco Canales	(Mexico) Alacranes de Durango		
July 21, 2025	11	FW	(United States) Christian Sorto	(Mexico) Loudoun United		

=== Loans in ===
No.	Pos.	Player	Loaned from	Start	End	Source
25	DF	(Mexico) Arturo Ortiz	(Mexico) FC Juárez	January 1, 2025	December 31, 2025	
20	FW	(Honduras) Daniel Carter	(Honduras) Real C.D. España	January 9, 2025	July 16, 2025	
7	DF	(United States) Bryan Romero	(Mexico) FC Juárez	February 26, 2025	December 31, 2025	

=== Academy contracts ===
Date	Pos.	No.	Player	Ref.
March 5, 2025	FW	50	(United States) Axel Valdivia	
March 5, 2025	DF	66	(United States) Raul Vazquez	

=== Out ===
Date	No.	Pos.	Player	To	Notes	Source
November 25, 2024	4	DF	(United States) Lucas Stauffer	(United States) Lexington SC	Mutual agreement	
November 25, 2024	13	GK	(Mexico) Javier Garcia	(United States) Texoma FC	Out of Contract	
November 25, 2024		DF	(Germany) Dennis Erdmann		Out of Contract	
November 25, 2024	31	DF	(United States) Nick Hinds		Out of Contract	
November 25, 2024	16	DF	(United States) Miles Lyons	(United States) Monterey Bay FC	Out of Contract	
November 25, 2024	9	FW	(Germany) Malik McLemore	(Germany) 1. FC Lokomotive Leipzig	Out of Contract	
November 25, 2024	7	FW	(El Salvador) Joaquín Rivas		Out of Contract	
November 25, 2024	17	FW	(United States) Ricardo Zacarías		Out of Contract	
January 20, 2025	21	DF	(Nigeria) Bolu Akinyode	(United States) Miami FC	Mutual agreement	
June 30, 2025	11	FW	(South Africa) Tumi Moshobane	(United States) Charlotte Independence	Mutual agreement	

=== Loan out ===
No.	Pos.	Player	Loaned to	Start	End	Source
15	FW	(Dominican Republic) Noah Dollenmayer	(United States) San Antonio FC	September 9, 2025	December 31, 2025	

=== New contracts ===
Date	Pos.	No.	Player	Contract until	Ref.
November 25, 2024	DF	25	(Mexico) Arturo Ortiz		
November 25, 2024	MF	33	(United States) Ricky Ruiz		
November 25, 2024	MF	30	(United States) Robert Coronado		
November 25, 2024	FW	18	(South Africa) Tumi Moshobane	2025	
December 20, 2024	FW	19	(Colombia) Andy Cabrera	2025	

== Non-competitive fixtures ==
=== Preseason ===
Win	Draw	Loss

Date	Opponent	Venue	Location	Result	Scorers
February 1	Barca Residency Academy	Westside Soccer Complex	El Paso, Texas	4–0	Torrees; Trialist; Quezada; Moreno
February 8	UDA Soccer	Westside Soccer Complex	El Paso, Texas		
February 19	Houston Dynamo 2		San Antonio, Texas		
February 22	San Antonio FC		San Antonio, Texas		
March 1	New Mexico United		Albuquerque, New Mexico		

== Competitive fixtures ==
=== USL Championship ===
==== Standings — Western Conference ====
Pos	Team	Pld	W	L	T	GF	GA	GD	Pts	Qualification
1	FC Tulsa	30	16	5	9	50	30	+20	57	Playoffs
2	Sacramento Republic FC	30	13	8	9	44	27	+17	48 (Note: Sacramento Republic FC are ahead of New Mexico United on head-to-head points: SAC 6, NMU 0.)	Playoffs
3	New Mexico United	30	14	10	6	45	41	+4	48	Playoffs
4	El Paso Locomotive FC	30	10	9	11	47	45	+2	41	Playoffs
5	Phoenix Rising FC	30	9	8	13	48	48	0	40 (Note: Phoenix Rising FC are ahead of San Antonio FC on head-to-head points: PHX 6, SAN 0.)	Playoffs
6	San Antonio FC	30	11	12	7	39	38	+1	40	Playoffs
7	Orange County SC	30	10	11	9	44	45	−1	39	Playoffs
8	Colorado Springs Switchbacks FC	30	10	13	7	35	47	−12	37	Playoffs
9	Lexington SC	30	9	12	9	31	42	−11	36	
10	Oakland Roots SC	30	8	14	8	42	52	−10	32	
11	Monterey Bay FC	30	7	15	8	27	45	−18	29	
12	Las Vegas Lights FC	30	6	15	9	23	50	−27	27	

Source: USL Championship Standings
Rules for classification: 1) head-to-head points; 2) head-to-head goal differential; 3) points-per-game within conference; 4) total wins; 5) total goal differential; 6) total goals scored; 7) points earned against top four Conference finishers; 8) disciplinary points; 9) coin toss or drawing of lots

==== Match results ====
Win	Draw	Loss

Matchday	Date	Opponent	Venue	Location	Result	Scorers	Attendance	Referee	Position
1	March 8	Colorado Springs Switchbacks FC	Southwest University Park	El Paso, Texas	2–2	Moreno 43'; Cabrera 90+2'	5,787	Elijio Arreguin	7th, Western
2	March 15	Phoenix Rising FC	Southwest University Park	El Paso, Texas	4–4	Avila 6'; Moreno 43', 53'; Torres 47'	4,386	Calin Radosav	9th, Western
3	March 22	New Mexico United	Isotopes Park	Albuquerque, New Mexico	0–1		11,005	Gerald Flores	9th, Western
4	March 29	Hartford Athletic	Trinity Health Stadium	Hartford, Connecticut	2–1	Avila 10'; Ackwei 86'	4,400	Atahan Yaya	6th, Western
5	April 5	Lexington SC	Southwest University Park	El Paso, Texas	2–1	Ortiz 22'; Cabrera 41'	4,180	Igor Bych	5th, Western
6	April 13	Birmingham Legion FC	Protective Stadium	Birmingham, Alabama	1–3	Cabrera 26'	6,920	Abdou Ndiaye	6th, Western
7	April 19	Colorado Springs Switchbacks FC	Weidner Field	Colorado Springs, Colorado	1–1	Coronado 13'		Servando Berna Rico	5th, Western
8	May 3	New Mexico United	Southwest University Park	El Paso, Texas	3–0	Cabrera; 12', 51', 83'	7,059	Thomas Snyder	5th, Western
9	May 10	FC Tulsa	ONEOK Field	Tulsa, Oklahoma	1–1	Cabrera 32'		Mark Verso	5th, Western
10	May 16	Indy Eleven	Southwest University Park	El Paso, Texas	4–1	Moreno 13'; Calvillo 32'; Daroma 82'	5,077	Greg Dopka	4th, Western
11	May 24	Las Vegas Lights FC	Cashman Field	Las Vegas, Nevada	2–1	Cabrera 37', 64'	2,396	Joshua Encarnación	2nd, Western
12	June 7	Oakland Roots SC	Oakland Coliseum	Oakland, California	0–0		7,586	Ramy Touchan	3rd, Western
13	June 14	Orange County SC	Southwest University Park	El Paso, Texas	0–3		4,573	Edson Carvajal	4th, Western
14	June 21	Monterey Bay FC	Cardinale Stadium	Seaside, California	2–1	Ackwei 15'; Cabrera 56' (pen)	3,257	Rodrigo Albuquerque	3rd, Western
15; Copa Tejas	July 4	San Antonio FC	Southwest University Park	El Paso, Texas	1–2	Moreno 67'	8,432	Thomas Snyder	4th, Western
16	July 12	Sacramento Republic FC	Heart Health Park	Sacramento, California	0–3		8,196	Cristian Campo	7th, Western
17	August 2	Las Vegas Lights FC	Southwest University Park	El Paso, Texas	6–0	Moreno 18'; Quezada 39'; Calvillo 52', 75'; Avila 62'; M. Rodriguez 89'	4,722	Elijio Arreguin	4th, Western
18	August 9	Miami FC	Pitbull Stadium	Miami, Florida	0–0		1,496	Elton García	4th, Western
19	August 16	Monterey Bay FC	Southwest University Park	El Paso, Texas	2–2	Sorto 23', 59'	4,564	Nabil Bensalah	4th, Western
20	August 23	Sacramento Republic FC	Southwest University Park	El Paso, Texas	1–0	Torres 41'	6,349	Edson Carvajal	3rd, Western
21	August 30	Phoenix Rising FC	Phoenix Rising Soccer Stadium	Phoenix, Arizona	3–3	Moreno 73'; Torres 81'; Ruiz 90+8	4,030	Muhammad Kaleia	3rd, Western
22	September 6	Loudoun United FC	Southwest University Park	El Paso, Texas	1–2	Ortiz 66'	4,720	Matthew Corrigan	3rd, Western
23	September 12	North Carolina FC	WakeMed Soccer Park	Cary, North Carolina	0–1		2,365	Joe Surgan	5th, Western
24	September 20	Charleston Battery	Southwest University Park	El Paso, Texas	0–2		7,842	Servando Berna Rico	6th, Western
25	September 27	Rhode Island FC	Southwest University Park	El Paso, Texas	2–2	Diaz 44'; Holstad o.g. 74'	5,312	Joshua Encarnación	6th, Western
26	October 1	Oakland Roots SC	Southwest University Park	El Paso, Texas	3–1	Moreno 1', 72; Calvillo 5'	4,049	Amin Hadzic	5th, Western
27	October 4	Orange County SC	Championship Soccer Stadium	Irvine, California	0–0		5,000	Elton García	5th, Western
28	October 11	Lexington SC	Lexington SC Stadium	Lexington, Kentucky	2–1	Diaz 9'; Avila 31'	4,434	Edson Carvajal	4th, Western
29	October 18	FC Tulsa	Southwest University Park	El Paso, Texas	1–1	Torres 24'	5,657	Natalie Simon	4th, Western
30; Copa Tejas	October 25	San Antonio FC	Toyota Field	San Antonio, Texas	2−5	Moreno 7'; Sorto 54'	8,164	Abdou Ndiaye	4th, Western

=== USL Championship playoffs ===
Round	Date	Opponent	Venue	Location	Result	Scorers	Attendance	Referee
Conference Quarterfinals	November 1	Phoenix Rising FC	Southwest University Park	El Paso, Texas				

=== U.S. Open Cup ===
Round	Date	Opponent	Venue	Location	Result	Scorers	Attendance	Referee
First	March 19	(Colorado) Harpos FC	Southwest University Park	El Paso, Texas	5–1	Avila 12'; Romero 37' 45+2'; Own goal 54'; Torres 59'	1,595	Melvin Rivas
Second	April 2	(California) Ventura County FC	Dignity Health Sports Park	Carson, California	3–0	Carter 17'; Alfaro 29'; Cabrera 81'	50	Steven Cardozo
Third	April 16	New Mexico United	UNM Soccer Complex	Albuquerque, New Mexico	2–2(a.e.t.) (4–1 p)	Carter 21'; Cabrera 90+7'		John Griggs
R32	May 7	(Texas) Austin FC	Q2 Stadium	Austin, Texas	2–3	Avila 20', 34'		Elton García

=== USL Jägermeister Cup ===
==== Standings ====
Pos	Lg	Team	Pld	W	PKW	PKL	L	GF	GA	GD	Pts	Qualification
1	USLC	San Antonio FC	4	3	0	1	0	6	2	+4	10	Advance to knockout stage
2	USLC	New Mexico United	4	1	2	1	0	9	7	+2	8	
3	USLC	Colorado Springs Switchbacks FC	4	2	0	1	1	7	4	+3	7	
4	USLC	Phoenix Rising FC	4	1	2	0	1	10	10	0	7	
5	USLC	El Paso Locomotive FC	4	1	1	1	1	3	3	0	6	
6	USL1	Union Omaha	4	1	0	0	3	3	5	−2	3	
7	USL1	Texoma FC	4	0	0	1	3	5	12	−7	1	

Updated to match(es) played on July 26, 2025. Source: USL
Rules for classification: 1) points; 2) head-to-head points earned in group play; 3) total wins in group play; 4) goals for in group play; 5) goals against in group play; 6) disciplinary points; 7) coin toss.

Round	Date	Opponent	Venue	Location	Result	Scorers	Attendance	Referee
1	April 26	Texoma FC	Sherman Bearcat Stadium	Sherman, Texas	0–0 (6–5 p)		947	Jaclyn Metz
2	May 31	Colorado Springs Switchbacks FC	Southwest University Park	El Paso, Texas	0–1		5,845	Muhammad Hassan
3	July 19	Phoenix Rising FC	Southwest University Park	El Paso, Texas	2–2 (6–7 p)	Torres 11'; Cabrera 38'	5,416	Matthew Thompson
4	July 26	Union Omaha	Werner Park	Omaha, Nebraska	1-0	Avila 39'	2,176	Amin Hadzic

== Awards and honors ==
=== USL Championship Team of the Matchday ===
Matchday	Player	Opponent	Position	Ref
1	(Sierra Leone) Frank Daroma	Colorado Springs Switchbacks	MF	
1	(El Salvador) Amando Moreno	Colorado Springs Switchbacks	Bench	
2	(United States) Beto Avila	Phoenix Rising FC	FW	
2	(El Salvador) Amando Moreno (2)	Phoenix Rising FC	MF	
2	(Brazil) Gabriel Torres	Phoenix Rising FC	DF	
4	(Ghana) Wahab Ackwei	Hartford Athletic	DF	
5	(Brazil) Gabriel Torres (2)	Lexington SC	MF	
5	(Mexico) Arturo Ortiz	Lexington SC	DF	
7	(United States) Robert Coronado	Colorado Springs Switchbacks FC	MF	
8/9	(Colombia) Andy Cabrera	New Mexico United	FW	
8/9	(Brazil) Gabriel Torres (3)	New Mexico United	MF	
8/9	(Sierra Leone) Frank Daroma (2)	New Mexico United	Bench	
10	(Dominican Republic) Noah Dollenmayer	FC Tulsa	Bench	
11	(Colombia) Andy Cabrera (2)	Indy Eleven	FW	
11	(El Salvador) Eric Calvillo	Indy Eleven	MF	
11	(Mexico) Arturo Ortiz (2)	Indy Eleven	Bench	
12	(Colombia) Andy Cabrera (3)	Las Vegas Lights FC	FW	
12	(Sierra Leone) Frank Daroma (3)	Las Vegas Lights FC	MF	
12	(United States) Ricky Ruiz	Las Vegas Lights FC	Bench	
12	(United States) Beto Avila (2)	Las Vegas Lights FC	Bench	
16	(Colombia) Andy Cabrera (4)	Monterey Bay FC	FW	
16	(Brazil) Gabi Torres (4)	Monterey Bay FC	DF	
16	(Ghana) Wahab Ackwei (2)	Monterey Bay FC	Bench	
USL Cup 4	(Brazil) Gabi Torres (5)	Union Omaha	MF	
22	(El Salvador) Amando Moreno (3)	Las Vegas Lights	FW	
22	(Colombia) Andy Cabrera (5)	Las Vegas Lights	FW	
22	(Brazil) Gabriel Torres (6)	Las Vegas Lights	MF	
22	(El Salvador) Eric Calvillo (2)	Las Vegas Lights	MF	
24	(United States) Christian Sorto	Monterey Bay FC	FW	
25	(Brazil) Gabriel Torres (7)	Sacramento Republic FC	MF	
26	(United States) Ricky Ruiz	Phoenix Rising FC	DF	
30	(El Salvador) Eric Calvillo (3)	Rhode Island FC	Bench	
31	(El Salvador) Amando Moreno (4)	Orange County SC	FW	
31	(El Salvador) Eric Calvillo (4)	Orange County SC	Bench)	

=== Player of the Matchday ===
Matchday	Player	Opponent	Ref
2	(El Salvador) Amando Moreno	Phoenix Rising FC	
5	(Brazil) Gabriel Torres	Lexington SC	
8/9	(Colombia) Andy Cabrera	New Mexico United	
12	(Colombia) Andy Cabrera (2)	Las Vegas Lights FC	
