= 2026 El Paso Locomotive FC season =

El Paso Locomotive FC
2026 season
- Head coach: Junior Gonzalez
- Stadium: Southwest University Park, El Paso, TX
- USLC: Western Conference: 3rd
- 2026 U.S. Open Cup: Round of 32
- USL Cup: Group Stage
- Copa Tejas Shield: 1st
Home colors	Away colors
- All statistics correct as of March 28, 2026 (UTC).

The 2026 El Paso Locomotive FC season is the eighth season for El Paso Locomotive FC in the USL Championship, the second tier of professional soccer in the United States.

== Staff ==
Position	Name
Head coach	(United States) Brian Clarhaut
Assistant coach	(United States) Marina Schachowskoj
Assistant coach	(United States) Gianluca Masucci
Assistant coach	(United States) Jon Burklo
Goalkeeping coach	(Colombia) Juan Carlos "JC" Garzon
Coordinator, equipment and player operations	(United States) Saul Soto

== Roster ==
As of February 18, 2026

Note: Flags indicate national team as defined under FIFA eligibility rules; some limited exceptions apply. Players may hold more than one non-FIFA nationality.

No.	Pos.	Nation	Player
1	GK	USA	Sebastián Mora-Mora
2	DF	PUR	Nicolás Cardona
5	MF	USA	Daniel Gómez
6	MF	ESA	Eric Calvillo
8	MF	HAI	Carl Sainté
9	FW	MEX	Diego Abitia
10	FW	ESA	Amando Moreno
11	FW	LBR	Jimmy Farkarlun
12	DF	USA	Ricky Ruiz
13	FW	USA	Beto Avila
14	FW	GUA	Rubio Rubín
15	DF	DOM	Noah Dollenmayer
16	DF	BRA	Gabi Torres

No.	Pos.	Nation	Player
18	DF	USA	Alvaro Quezada
19	MF	USA	Alex Mendez
21	MF	GHA	Kofi Twumasi
23	DF	USA	Memo Diaz
25	DF	MEX	Arturo Ortiz
28	FW	USA	Omar Mora
29	DF	USA	Kenneth Hoban
30	MF	USA	Robert Coronado
77	DF	USA	Joseluis Villagomez
91	FW	MEX	Cristo Fernández
93	DF	MEX	Tony Alfaro
99	GK	MEX	Abraham Romero

== Competitive fixtures ==
=== USL Championship ===
==== Standings — Western Conference ====
Pos	Team	Pld	W	L	T	GF	GA	GD	Pts	Qualification
1	New Mexico United	30	15	8	7	45	34	+11	52	Playoffs
2	Sacramento Republic FC	30	13	5	12	42	28	+14	51	Playoffs
3	El Paso Locomotive FC	30	15	10	5	48	38	+10	50	Playoffs
4	Lexington SC	30	14	10	6	57	39	+18	48	Playoffs
5	Colorado Springs Switchbacks FC	30	13	9	8	44	38	+6	47	Playoffs
6	San Antonio FC	30	11	7	12	32	30	+2	45	Playoffs
7	FC Tulsa	30	11	9	10	34	31	+3	43	Playoffs
8	Phoenix Rising FC	30	11	10	9	45	46	−1	42	Playoffs
9	Orange County SC	30	10	11	9	39	49	−10	39	
10	Oakland Roots SC	30	9	10	11	39	40	−1	38	
11	Las Vegas Lights FC	30	10	14	6	41	48	−7	36	
12	Monterey Bay FC	30	6	18	6	32	52	−20	24	

Updated to match(es) played on October 24, 2026. Source: USL Championship Standings
Rules for classification: 1) total wins against conference opponents; 2) goal differential against conference opponents; 3) goals scored against conference opponents; 4) head-to-head points against conference opponents; 5) points per game against conference opponents; 6) points per game against non-conference opponents; 7) fewest disciplinary points; 8) coin toss or drawing of lots

==== Match results ====
On December 16, 2025, the USL Championship released the schedule for all 25 teams for both the regular season and the USL Cup.

All times are in Mountain Time.

March 7 1	El Paso Locomotive FC	2–2	Colorado Springs Switchbacks FC	El Paso, Texas
7:00 p.m.	Rubín 21', 50'	Report	Bennett 5' * Foster 67'	Stadium: Southwest University Park; Attendance: 6,079; Referee: Muhammad Hassan

March 14 2	Monterey Bay FC	0–3	El Paso Locomotive FC	Seaside, California
8:00 p.m.	Joseph (yellow card) 33' (yellow-red card) 66'	Report	Méndez 21' * Rubín 51' * Moreno 53'	Stadium: Cardinale Stadium; Attendance: 2,950; Referee: Servando Berna Rico

March 28 3	Sacramento Republic FC	1–2	El Paso Locomotive FC	Sacramento, California
8:00 p.m.	Benítez 90+2' (pen.)	Report	Moreno 25'; Méndez 37' (pen.); Calvillo (yellow card) 44' (yellow-red card) 55'	Stadium: Heart Health Park; Attendance: 8,072; Referee: Trevor Wiseman

April 4 4	El Paso Locomotive FC	3–2	Las Vegas Lights FC	El Paso, Texas
7:00 p.m.	Moreno 7', 48'; Rubín 34'	Report	Pinzón 23'; Rodriguez 60'	Stadium: Southwest University Park; Attendance: 5,432; Referee: Benjamin Meyer

April 11 5	Hartford Athletic	0–4	El Paso Locomotive FC	Hartford, Connecticut
6:00 p.m.		Report	Calvillo 12'; Alfaro 24' (pen.); Abitia 32'; Torres 64'	Stadium: Trinity Health Stadium; Attendance: 3,299; Referee: Calin Radosav

April 18 6	El Paso Locomotive FC	2–3	San Antonio FC	El Paso, Texas
7:00 p.m.	Rubín 45+2'; Avila 55'	Report	Crognale 16'; Hernandez 43'; Parano 90'	Stadium: Southwest University Park; Referee: Rodrigo Albuquerque

April 29 7	El Paso Locomotive FC	1–4	FC Tulsa	El Paso, Texas
8:00 p.m.	Torres (red card) 11'; Méndez 57' (pen.)	Report	Cabral 45+2', 58'; Pierre 73'; ElMedkhar 84'	Stadium: Southwest University Park; Attendance: 3,704; Referee: Ekaterina Koroleva

May 6 8	New Mexico United	2–2	El Paso Locomotive FC	Albuquerque, New Mexico
7:00 p.m.	Hurst 14', 24'	Report	Rubin 12'; Abitia 86'	Stadium: Isotopes Park; Attendance: 7,758; Referee: Benjamin Meyer

May 9 9	Oakland Roots	2–1	El Paso Locomotive FC	Oakland, California
8:00 p.m.	Wilson] 45+5'; Lepley 83'	Report	Rubin 3'; Ortiz (red card) 18'	Stadium: Oakland Coliseum; Attendance: 4,076; Referee: Thomas Snyder

May 30 10	El Paso Locomotive FC	1–4	Lexington SC	El Paso, Texas
7:00 p.m.	Abitia (red card) 29'; Coronado (red card) 62'; Rubín 89' (pen.)	Report	Quezada 9' (o.g.); Epps 44'; Goodrum 64'; Scott 81'	Stadium: Southwest University Park; Attendance: 5,668; Referee: Matthew Corrigan

June 10 12	Detroit City FC	1–1	El Paso Locomotive FC	Hamtramck, Michigan
6:30 p.m.	Yamazaki (yellow card) 6'; Stanley (yellow card) 30'; Diop 49'	Report	Moreno 42'; Méndez (yellow card) 44'; Calvillo (yellow card) 69'	Stadium: Keyworth Stadium; Referee: Abdou Ndiaye

June 13 12	El Paso Locomotive FC	1–1	Phoenix Rising FC	El Paso, Texas
7:00 p.m.	Méndez 46'	Report	Scearce 70'	Stadium: Southwest University Park; Attendance: 5,033; Referee: Brandon Stevis

June 20 13	Monterey Bay FC	1–0	El Paso Locomotive FC	Seaside, California
8:00 p.m.	Gindiri 90+1'	Report		Stadium: Cardinale Stadium; Attendance: 3,292; Referee: Robert Vincze

July 4 14	Las Vegas Lights FC	1–2	El Paso Locomotive FC	Las Vegas, Nevada
8:30 p.m.	Rodriguez 45+6'	Report	Méndez 20'; Quezada 52'	Stadium: Cashman Field; Attendance: 3,782; Referee: Edson Carvajal

July 18 15	FC Tulsa	1–0	El Paso Locomotive FC	Tulsa, Oklahoma
6:30 p.m.	Batista 45+1'	Report		Stadium: ONEOK Field; Attendance: 4,022; Referee: Muhammad Kaleia

July 25 16	El Paso Locomotive FC	2–0	Sporting Club Jacksonville	El Paso, Texas
7:00 p.m.	Moreno 15'; Rubín 83'	Report		Stadium: Southwest University Park; Attendance: 4,709; Referee: Cristian Campo Hernández

August 1 17	Orange County SC	2–0	El Paso Locomotive FC	Irvine, California
8:00 p.m.	Sylla 26'; Tubbs 61'	Report		Stadium: Championship Soccer Stadium; Attendance: 5,008; Referee: Corbyn May

August 5 18	El Paso Locomotive FC	1–0	Monterey Bay FC	El Paso, Texas
7:00 p.m.	Méndez 30'	Report		Stadium: Southwest University Park; Attendance: 3,274; Referee: John Matto

August 8 19	El Paso Locomotive FC	1–0	Oakland Roots SC	El Paso, Texas
7:00 p.m.	Rubin 9'	Report		Stadium: Southwest University Park; Attendance: 4,723; Referee: John Griggs

August 15 20	San Antonio FC	0–3	El Paso Locomotive FC	San Antonio, Texas
7:00 p.m.		Report	Mendez 20', 39'; Farkarlun 44'	Stadium: Toyota Field; Attendance: 7,742; Referee: Matthew Thompson

August 22 21	Colorado Springs Switchbacks FC	0–1	El Paso Locomotive FC	Colorado Springs, Colorado
7:00 p.m.		Report	De Coteau 85' (o.g.)	Stadium: Weidner Field; Attendance: 7,742; Referee: Matthew Thompson

August 26 22	El Paso Locomotive FC	2–1	Pittsburgh Riverhounds SC	El Paso, Texas
7:00 p.m.	Calvillo 57'; Dollenmayer 90+3'	Report	Mertz 53'	Stadium: Southwest University Park; Attendance: 5,099; Referee: Elton García

August 29 23	El Paso Locomotive FC	4–1	Loudoun United FC	El Paso, Texas
7:00 p.m.	Rubín 5', 30', 40' (pen.); Sainté 90+1'	Report	Aboukoura 17'	Stadium: Southwest University Park; Attendance: 5,808; Referee: Jorge Escobar

September 12 24	Louisville City FC	1–2	El Paso Locomotive FC	Louisville, Kentucky
6:00 p.m.	Perez 77'	Report	Méndez 24' (pen.); Rubín 45'	Stadium: Lynn Family Stadium; Attendance: 8,834; Referee: Matthew Corrigan

September 19 25	Phoenix Rising FC	1–3	El Paso Locomotive FC	Phoenix, Arizona
8:00 p.m.	Czichos 41'; Biasi (yellow card) 78' (yellow-red card) 80'	Report	Rubín 11', 90+6'; Calvillo 51'	Stadium: Phoenix Rising Soccer Stadium; Attendance: 7,061; Referee: Servando Berna Rico

September 25 26	El Paso Locomotive FC	1–1	FC Tulsa	El Paso, Texas
7:00 p.m.	Avila 17'	Report	Dorsey 8'	Stadium: Southwest University Park; Referee: Gerald Flores

October 3 27	Lexington SC	3–1	El Paso Locomotive FC	Lexington, Kentucky
6:00 p.m.	Zengue 32'; Goodrum 62'; Rodrigues 66'	Report	Ortiz (red card) 24'; Moreno 37'	Stadium: Lexington SC Stadium; Attendance: 4,677

October 10 28	El Paso Locomotive FC	2–1	Orange County SC	El Paso, Texas
7:00 p.m.	Moreno 30'; Farkarlun 43'	Report	Hegardt 51'	Stadium: Southwest University Park; Attendance: 4,892; Referee: Carlos Rodriguez

October 17 29	El Paso Locomotive FC	0–1	Sacramento Republic FC	El Paso, Texas
7:00 p.m.		Report	Rodríguez 87'	Stadium: Southwest University Park; Referee: Matthew Thompson

October 24 30	El Paso Locomotive FC	0–1	New Mexico United	El Paso, Texas
7:00 p.m.		Report	Noël 90+4'	Stadium: Southwest University Park; Attendance: 5,770; Referee: Calin Radosav

=== USL Championship Playoffs ===
As the third seed in the Western Conference, El Paso qualified for the playoffs, matched up at home against fellow Texan soccer team, San Antonio FC. After a 2–1 victory at home against San Antonio, the Locomotive were scheduled away in the semi-finals, set to play against Sacramento Republic FC.

October 30 Quarter-finals	El Paso Locomotive FC	2–1	San Antonio FC	El Paso, Texas
7:00 PM MT	Rubín 14'; Twumasi (yellow card) 20'; Ortiz (yellow card) 34'; Ruiz (yellow card) 45'; Avila (yellow card) 45'; Alfaro 54' (yellow card) 74'; Dollenmayer (yellow card) 88'; Coronado (yellow card) 90+2'	Report	Patiño (yellow card) 30'; Berrón (yellow card) 37'; Crognale (yellow card) 65'; Pacheco 84'; Hernández (yellow card) 90+4'	Stadium: Southwest University Park; Attendance: 4,078; Referee: Jeremy Scheer

November 7 Semi-finals	Sacramento Republic FC	v	El Paso Locomotive FC	Sacramento, California
7:00 PM MT				Stadium: Heart Health Park

=== U.S. Open Cup ===
The Locomotive entered the 2026 US Open Cup at home against fellow Texan soccer club Laredo Heat SC, an amateur club that plays in the USL League Two. Following an easy route of Heat, El Paso was matched up at away against fellow USL Championship club New Mexico United, who they beat comfortably by four goals. Following their victory, the Locomotive were scheduled away against fellow Texan club Houston Dynamo FC of first-division MLS, whom they eventually lost to by three goals.

March 19 Round 1	(Texas) Laredo Heat SC (USL2)	0–2	(Texas) El Paso Locomotive FC (USLC)	Laredo, Texas
8:30 PM ET		Report	Abitia 51'; Rubín 89'	Stadium: PEG Energy Stadium; Attendance: 450; Referee: Edgar García

April 1 Round 2	New Mexico United (USLC) (New Mexico)	0–4	(Texas) El Paso Locomotive FC (USLC)	Albuquerque, New Mexico
9:30 p.m. ET		Report	Quezada 37'; Mendez 63'; Rubín 69'; Calvillo 86'	Stadium: UNM Soccer Complex; Referee: Rodrigo Albuquerque

April 15 Round of 32	(Texas) Houston Dynamo FC (MLS)	4–1	(Texas) El Paso Locomotive FC (USLC)	Houston, Texas
8:00 PM ET	Lingr 2'; Bogusz 46'; Markanich 58'; Ponce 80'	Report	Avila 75'	Stadium: Shell Energy Stadium; Referee: Trevor Wiseman

=== USL Cup ===
The Locos participated in the third edition of the USL Cup, and the second edition to feature teams from both the USL Championship and League One. Despite winning twice, the Locos failed to qualify for the knockout rounds.

==== Standings ====
Pos	Lg	Team	Pld	W	PKW	PKL	L	GF	GA	GD	Pts	Qualification
1	USLC	Colorado Springs Switchbacks FC	4	4	0	0	0	10	1	+9	12	Advance to knockout stage
2	USLC	New Mexico United	4	3	0	0	1	8	5	+3	9	
3	USLC	El Paso Locomotive FC	4	2	0	0	2	5	5	0	6	
4	USL1	AV Alta FC	4	2	0	0	2	5	6	−1	6	
5	USLC	Phoenix Rising FC	4	1	0	0	3	3	8	−5	3	

==== Group stage ====
April 25	Orange County SC	1–2	El Paso Locomotive FC	Irvine, California
8:00 PM	Doody 51'; Marinch (yellow card) 34' (yellow-red card) 58'	Report	Alfaro 64'; Coronado 78'	Stadium: Championship Soccer Stadium; Attendance: 4,408; Referee: Jaclyn Metz

May 27	El Paso Locomotive FC	2–0	AV Alta FC	El Paso, Texas
9:00 p.m.	Dollenmayer 72'; Abitia 79'	Report		Stadium: Southwest University Park; Attendance: 5,042; Referee: Justin St. Pierre

June 6	Colorado Springs Switchbacks FC	2–1	El Paso Locomotive FC	Colorado Springs, Colorado
7:00 p.m.	Tejada 38'; Fjeldberg 70'	Report	Alfaro 45+2'	Stadium: Weidner Field; Attendance: 6,092; Referee: Joshua Encarnación

July 11	El Paso Locomotive FC	0–2	New Mexico United	El Paso, Texas
7:00 p.m.		Report	Quiah 85'; Bailey 89'	Stadium: Southwest University Park; Attendance: 5,011; Referee: Jeremy Scheer
