= 2025 USL Championship season =

15th season of the USL Championship

USL Championship
- Season: 2025
- Dates: March 8 – October 25 (regular season); November 1–22 (playoffs)
- Champions: Pittsburgh Riverhounds (1st title)
- Players' Shield: Louisville City FC (2nd title)
- Matches: 360
- Goals: 972 (2.7 per match)
- Best Player: (United States) Taylor Davila (Louisville City FC)
- Top goalscorer: (Liberia) Peter Wilson (Oakland Roots SC) (18 goals)
- Best goalkeeper: (United States) Damian Las (10 clean sheets; 0.70 goals against average; 80 save percentage)
- Longest winning run: 7 Games Charleston Battery (April 5 – May 24); Louisville City FC (August 30 – October 11)
- Longest unbeaten run: 16 Games Louisville City FC (June 25 – October 25)
- Longest winless run: 13 Games Monterey Bay FC (June 14 – September 20)
- Longest losing run: 7 Games; Monterey Bay FC (June 14 – August 9)
- Highest attendance: 26,575 Oakland Roots SC 1–2 San Antonio FC March 22
- Lowest attendance: 583 Loudoun United 1–4 Louisville City FC June 25
- Total attendance: 2,002,663
- Average attendance: 5,563

The 2025 USL Championship season was the 15th season of the USL Championship, the eighth season under Division II sanctioning, and 30th season overall of a national division 2 league, in the United States.

Twenty-four teams in two conferences competed in the regular season. Lexington SC joined from USL League One. Memphis 901 FC withdrew because it was unable to secure the construction of a soccer-specific stadium. The team transferred their franchise rights to Santa Barbara Sky FC, which said they'd begin play in the 2026 season before announcing another delay, this time to the 2027 season. The Brooklyn FC men's team, which was scheduled to begin play in 2025, elected to postpone its debut to the 2026 season.

All 24 teams participated in the USL Jägermeister Cup alongside the 14 USL League One teams.

Colorado Springs Switchbacks FC were the defending league champions and Louisville City FC were the defending Players' Shield winners.

== Teams ==
Locations of teams for the 2025 USL Championship season
Western Conference Eastern Conference

=== Changes from 2024 ===
Expansion clubs

- Lexington SC (from USL League One)

Departing clubs

- Memphis 901 FC (franchise rights transferred to Santa Barbara Sky FC)

=== Stadiums and locations ===
Team	Stadium	Capacity
Birmingham Legion FC	Protective Stadium	47,000
Charleston Battery	Patriots Point Soccer Complex	5,000
Colorado Springs Switchbacks FC	Weidner Field	8,000
Detroit City FC	Keyworth Stadium	7,933
FC Tulsa	ONEOK Field	7,833
El Paso Locomotive FC	Southwest University Park	9,500
Hartford Athletic	Trinity Health Stadium	5,500
Indy Eleven	IU Michael A. Carroll Track & Soccer Stadium	10,524
Las Vegas Lights FC	Cashman Field	9,334
Lexington SC	Lexington SC Stadium	7,500
Loudoun United FC	Segra Field	5,000
Louisville City FC	Lynn Family Stadium	15,304
Miami FC	Pitbull Stadium	25,000
Monterey Bay FC	Cardinale Stadium	6,000
North Carolina FC	First Horizon Stadium at WakeMed Soccer Park	10,000
New Mexico United	Rio Grande Credit Union Field at Isotopes Park	13,500
Oakland Roots SC	Oakland Coliseum	53,200 (15,000)
Orange County SC	Championship Soccer Stadium	5,000
Phoenix Rising FC	Phoenix Rising Soccer Stadium	10,000
Pittsburgh Riverhounds SC	Highmark Stadium	5,000
Rhode Island FC	Centreville Bank Stadium	10,500
Sacramento Republic FC	Heart Health Park	11,569
San Antonio FC	Toyota Field	8,296
Tampa Bay Rowdies	Al Lang Stadium	7,227

1. Non-soccer specific stadium.
2. Soccer seating capacity.

=== Personnel and sponsorships ===
Team	Head coach	Captain(s)	Kit manufacturer	Kit sponsor
Birmingham Legion FC	(United States) Mark Briggs	(Rwanda) Phanuel Kavita	Hummel	Coca-Cola
Charleston Battery	(United States) Ben Pirmann	(Trinidad and Tobago) Leland Archer	Hummel	The Ideal Life
Colorado Springs Switchbacks FC	(Republic of Ireland) James Chambers	(United States) Matt Mahoney	Capelli Sport	CommonSpirit Health
Detroit City FC	(England) Danny Dichio	(Republic of Ireland) Stephen Carroll	Adidas	Metro Detroit Area Chevrolet Dealers
El Paso Locomotive FC	(Colombia) Wilmer Cabrera		Hummel	Southwest University at El Paso
Hartford Athletic	(United States) Brendan Burke	(Jamaica) Jordan Scalett	Hummel	Trinity Health of New England
Indy Eleven	(England) Sean McAuley	(United States) Aodhan Quinn	Under Armour	Ford
Las Vegas Lights FC	(Italy) Antonio Nocerino	(England) Charlie Adams	Hummel	LiUNA!
Lexington SC	(United States) Terry Boss	(Jamaica) Speedy Williams (United States) Marcus Epps	Hummel	UK HealthCare Sports Medicine
Loudoun United FC	(United States) Ryan Martin	(United States) Zach Ryan (United States) Drew Skundrich	Capelli Sport	CORAS
Louisville City FC	(United States) Danny Cruz	(United States) Brian Ownby	Puma	GE Appliances
Miami FC	(Argentina) Gastόn Maddoni	(Puerto Rico) Nicolás Cardona	Macron	micromobility.com
Monterey Bay FC	(England) Jordan Stewart	(Montserrat) Nico Gordon	Charly	Montage Health
New Mexico United	(United States) Dennis Sanchez	(United States) Talen Maples (United States) Kalen Ryden	Puma	Meow Wolf (home); Sandia Resort and Casino (away)
North Carolina FC	(United States) John Bradford	(England) Paco Craig	Charly	EmergeOrtho
Oakland Roots SC	(Turks and Caicos Islands) Gavin Glinton	(United States) Tyler Gibson	Charly	Elevance Health
Orange County SC	(England) Danny Stone	(England) Tom Brewitt	Hummel	Hoag
Phoenix Rising FC	(Norway) Pa-Modou Kah	(Senegal) Pape Mar Boye	Adidas	Carvana
Pittsburgh Riverhounds SC	(United States) Bob Lilley	(United States) Danny Griffin	Charly	Allegheny Health Network (home); 84 Lumber (away)
Rhode Island FC	(Bermuda) Khano Smith	(Spain) Koke Vegas	Capelli Sport	Breeze Airways
Sacramento Republic FC	(Scotland) Neill Collins	(United States) Rodrigo López	Hummel	UCDavis Health
San Antonio FC	(United States) Carlos Llamosa	(United States) Mitchell Taintor	Charly	Community First Health Plans
Tampa Bay Rowdies	(Scotland) Robbie Neilson	(Mexico) Aaron Guillen	Charly	Spectrum
FC Tulsa	(United States) Luke Spencer	(France) Abdoulaye Cissoko	Hummel	Williams

=== Managerial changes ===
Team	Outgoing manager	Manner of departure	Date of vacancy	Incoming manager	Date of appointment
San Antonio FC	(Canada) Alen Marcina	Mutual separation	October 31, 2024	(United States) Carlos Llamosa	December 16, 2024
Sacramento Republic FC	(England) Mark Briggs	Mutual separation	November 4, 2024	(Scotland) Neill Collins	December 21, 2024
Phoenix Rising FC	(Spain) Diego Gómez (interim)	End of interim period	November 7, 2024	(Norway) Pa-Modou Kah	November 18, 2024
Oakland Roots SC	(Turks and Caicos Islands) Gavin Glinton (interim)	End of interim period	November 12, 2024	(Turks and Caicos Islands) Gavin Glinton	November 12, 2024
FC Tulsa	(United States) Mario Sanchez	Promoted to Technical Director	November 13, 2024	(United States) Luke Spencer	November 13, 2024
Lexington SC	(England) Darren Powell	Promoted to front office	October 27, 2024	(United States) Terry Boss	December 4, 2024
New Mexico United	(United States) Eric Quill	Hired by (United States) FC Dallas	November 20, 2024	(United States) Dennis Sanchez	December 24, 2024
Orange County SC	(England) Danny Stone (interim)	End of interim period	December 13, 2024	(England) Danny Stone	December 13, 2024
Las Vegas Lights FC	(United States) Dennis Sanchez	Hired by (United States) New Mexico United	December 24, 2024	(Italy) Antonio Nocerino	January 9, 2025
Miami FC	(Brazil) Marcello Alves (interim)	End of interim period	January 23, 2025	(Argentina) Gastόn Maddoni	January 23, 2025
Birmingham Legion FC	(United States) Tom Soehn	Fired	April 9, 2025	(England) Mark Briggs	April 30, 2025

== Regular season ==
=== Format ===
The teams played an unbalanced 30-game schedule plus four USL Jägermeister Cup games. Each team played their conference opponents twice, home and away, and 8 of the 12 teams in the opposite conference. The top 8 teams in each conference will make the playoffs.

=== Eastern Conference ===
Pos	Team	Pld	W	L	T	GF	GA	GD	Pts	Qualification
1	Louisville City FC (S)	30	22	1	7	56	19	+37	73	Playoffs
2	Charleston Battery	30	19	6	5	62	32	+30	62	Playoffs
3	North Carolina FC	30	13	11	6	40	39	+1	45	Playoffs
4	Pittsburgh Riverhounds SC (C)	30	12	10	8	32	28	+4	44 (Note: Pittsburgh Riverhounds SC are ahead of Hartford Athletic on head-to-head points. PGH 6, HFD 0.)	Playoffs
5	Hartford Athletic	30	13	12	5	48	36	+12	44	Playoffs
6	Loudoun United FC	30	12	12	6	45	48	−3	42	Playoffs
7	Rhode Island FC	30	10	12	8	29	28	+1	38	Playoffs
8	Detroit City FC	30	9	11	10	33	35	−2	37	Playoffs
9	Indy Eleven	30	10	15	5	44	52	−8	35	
10	Tampa Bay Rowdies	30	9	14	7	43	50	−7	34	
11	Miami FC	30	8	16	6	29	44	−15	30	
12	Birmingham Legion FC	30	5	13	12	36	50	−14	27	

Source: USL Championship Standings
Rules for classification: 1) head-to-head points; 2) head-to-head goal differential; 3) points-per-game within conference; 4) total wins; 5) total goal differential; 6) total goals scored; 7) points earned against top four Conference finishers; 8) disciplinary points; 9) coin toss or drawing of lots
(C) Champions; (S) Players' Shield winner

=== Western Conference ===
Pos	Team	Pld	W	L	T	GF	GA	GD	Pts	Qualification
1	FC Tulsa	30	16	5	9	50	30	+20	57	Playoffs
2	Sacramento Republic FC	30	13	8	9	44	27	+17	48 (Note: Sacramento Republic FC are ahead of New Mexico United on head-to-head points: SAC 6, NMU 0.)	Playoffs
3	New Mexico United	30	14	10	6	45	41	+4	48	Playoffs
4	El Paso Locomotive FC	30	10	9	11	47	45	+2	41	Playoffs
5	Phoenix Rising FC	30	9	8	13	48	48	0	40 (Note: Phoenix Rising FC are ahead of San Antonio FC on head-to-head points: PHX 6, SAN 0.)	Playoffs
6	San Antonio FC	30	11	12	7	39	38	+1	40	Playoffs
7	Orange County SC	30	10	11	9	44	45	−1	39	Playoffs
8	Colorado Springs Switchbacks FC	30	10	13	7	35	47	−12	37	Playoffs
9	Lexington SC	30	9	12	9	31	42	−11	36	
10	Oakland Roots SC	30	8	14	8	42	52	−10	32	
11	Monterey Bay FC	30	7	15	8	27	45	−18	29	
12	Las Vegas Lights FC	30	6	15	9	23	50	−27	27	

Source: USL Championship Standings
Rules for classification: 1) head-to-head points; 2) head-to-head goal differential; 3) points-per-game within conference; 4) total wins; 5) total goal differential; 6) total goals scored; 7) points earned against top four Conference finishers; 8) disciplinary points; 9) coin toss or drawing of lots

=== Results table ===
Color Key: Home • Away • Win • Loss • Draw
Club	Match																													
Club	1	2	3	4	5	6	7	8	9	10	11	12	13	14	15	16	17	18	19	20	21	22	23	24	25	26	27	28	29	30
Birmingham Legion FC (BHM)	LDN	LOU	DET	PGH	ELP	HFD	TBR	RI	DET	MIA	IND	LOU	SAC	OAK	CHS	RI	NCA	COS	PHX	HFD	PGH	OCO	TUL	TBR	IND	SAN	NCA	LDN	MIA	CHS
Birmingham Legion FC (BHM)	1–3	1-1	2-2	0–2	3-1	0-1	2-2	0-1	1-1	2-1	0-1	2-4	1-0	0-1	0-0	1-1	3-2	0-1	3-3	1-4	1-1	4-4	1-1	1–4	1–2	0–0	1-1	1-0	2-3	1–2
Charleston Battery (CHB)	LOU	RI	NCA	TBR	PGH	IND	HAR	TBR	SAN	DET	LDN	HFD	MIA	PHX	BHM	NCA	NMU	MIA	LOU	PGH	LDN	RI	IND	OAK	ELP	OCO	COS	DET	SAC	BHM
Charleston Battery (CHB)	1–2	2-1	1–2	2-1	2-1	3-1	4-2	3-1	4-0	3-1	1-1	2-1	0-1	4-1	0-0	1–0	2-1	3-0	1-4	2-1	4-1	0-1	2-1	3–3	2-0	2–2	5-0	1-1	0-1	2-1
Colorado Springs Switchbacks (COS)	ELP	DET	SAC	IND	MB	ELP	SAN	PHX	LVL	PGH	OCO	NMU	OAK	LEX	LOU	BHM	LEX	OAK	OCO	PHX	TUL	MB	TBR	SAC	HFD	NMU	SAN	CHB	LVL	TUL
Colorado Springs Switchbacks (COS)	2-2	1-2	2-2	3-2	1-2	1-1	2-3	1-1	0-0	1-0	1–3	1-1	1-0	1-2	0-1	1-0	3–1	2–1	0-1	1-4	2–0	2–1	3–3	0-2	1–2	0–2	1-0	0-5	1–0	0-3
Detroit City FC (DET)	MIA	COS	BHM	LOU	MB	PHX	RI	IND	HFD	BHM	CHS	PGH	LDN	MIA	OAK	HFD	PGH	RI	IND	NCA	TBR	SAN	OCO	NMU	LEX	LOU	NCA	LDN	CHS	TBR
Detroit City FC (DET)	2-0	2-1	2-2	0-2	0-0	3-2	2-0	2-2	0-0	1-1	1–3	0-2	2-3	2-0	0-2	1-2	0-0	0-1	1-0	1-1	2–0	1-1	4–1	0-4	0–1	0–1	2–0	0–1	1-1	1-1
El Paso Locomotive FC (ELP)	COS	PHX	NMU	HFD	LEX	BHM	COS	NMU	TUL	IND	LVL	OAK	OCO	MB	SAN	SAC	LVL	MIA	MB	SAC	PHX	LDN	NCA	CHS	RI	OAK	OCO	LEX	TUL	SAN
El Paso Locomotive FC (ELP)	2-2	4-4	0-1	2-1	2-1	1-3	1-1	3-0	1-1	3-1	2-1	0-0	0-3	2-1	1-2	0-3	6-0	0-0	2-2	1-0	3-3	1-2	0-1	0-2	2-2	3-1	0-0	2-1	1-1	2-5
Hartford Athletic (HFD)	LEX	PGH	ELP	LDN	BHM	CHS	DET	LOU	IND	NCA	CHS	LDN	DET	TBR	RI	NMU	MIA	BHM	TUL	RI	IND	NCA	MIA	MB	PGH	COS	OAK	SAC	TBR	LOU
Hartford Athletic (HFD)	0-2	0-1	1–2	0-2	1-0	2-4	0-0	1-1	4-4	0-1	1-2	3-0	2-1	0-1	0-0	4–0	2-0	4–1	1-1	3-0	3-2	0-2	1–0	4–0	1–2	2–0	3-1	3-2	2-3	0-1
Indy Eleven (IND)	MIA	LEX	COS	NCA	CHS	DET	SAC	ELP	HFD	BHM	PGH	LVL	TBR	MB	RI	NCA	TBR	DET	LDN	MIA	LOU	HFD	CHS	RI	BHM	TUL	LOU	PGH	LDN	OCO
Indy Eleven (IND)	3-1	1-1	3-2	2-2	1-3	2-2	1-1	1-3	4-4	1-0	1-0	0-1	1-3	3–0	1-0	2-4	1–3	0-1	2-3	3-2	1-3	2-0	1-2	0–1	2–1	2–1	0–2	1-2	2–1	1-2
Las Vegas Lights FC (LVL)	TBR	NMU	OAK	OCO	LEX	TUL	LDN	COS	SAC	ELP	PHX	SAN	MB	IND	SAC	TUL	OCO	ELP	SAN	NMU	NCA	LEX	PHX	MIA	LOU	PGH	RI	OAK	COS	MB
Las Vegas Lights FC (LVL)	1–0	2-3	0-0	1-0	0-0	1-4	1–0	0-0	0-5	1–2	0–1	0-3	2-0	1-0	0-2	3-4	0-4	0-6	1-1	2-2	1–2	1–0	0-0	0-0	1-3	0–1	1-3	2-2	0-1	1-1
Lexington SC (LEX)	HFD	OCO	IND	SAN	ELP	LVL	MB	LOU	LDN	TUL	TBR	MB	NMU	COS	PHX	MIA	SAC	COS	PHX	SAN	OAK	LVL	NCA	OCO	DET	NMU	TUL	ELP	SAC	OAK
Lexington SC (LEX)	2-0	2-2	1-1	2-3	1-2	0-0	0-0	0-2	1-5	0-2	1-1	1-2	2-1	2-1	1-0	1-1	0-0	1-3	2-0	1-0	2-1	0-1	2-1	1-1	1–0	1–2	0-3	1-2	2–2	0-3
Loudoun United FC (LDN)	BHM	NCA	LOU	RI	HFD	TBR	PGH	LVL	LEX	MIA	CHS	DET	HFD	LOU	OCO	PGH	OAK	TUL	RI	IND	CHS	MIA	ELP	SAN	PHX	TBR	BHM	DET	IND	NCA
Loudoun United FC (LDN)	3-1	2-1	0-2	2-0	2-0	2-1	2-1	0-1	5-1	1-2	1-1	3-2	0-3	1-4	0-0	2-2	0-2	2-3	0-0	3-2	1-4	3-1	2–1	2–5	2-2	2-2	0-1	1–0	1-2	0-1
Louisville City FC (LOU)	CHS	BHM	LDN	DET	SAC	TBR	LEX	PGH	HFD	MB	TBR	RI	BHM	NCA	LDN	COS	TUL	NCA	CHS	MIA	NMU	IND	RI	PGH	LVL	DET	IND	MIA	OCO	HFD
Louisville City FC (LOU)	2-1	1-1	2-0	2-0	1-1	2-1	2-0	0-0	1-1	2-0	2-1	2-1	4-2	1-2	4-1	1-0	1-1	4-1	4–1	4-2	0-0	3-1	1-0	2–0	3-1	1–0	2-0	1-0	0-0	1–0
Miami FC (MIA)	DET	IND	TBR	NMU	SAN	NCA	MB	LDN	BHM	RI	TBR	CHS	DET	TUL	LEX	CHS	PGH	HFD	ELP	LOU	IND	LDN	HFD	LVL	RI	NCA	PGH	LOU	BHM	SAC
Miami FC (MIA)	0-2	1-3	1-2	0-1	2-1	2-1	1-1	2-1	1–2	1-0	1-2	1-0	0-2	2–2	1-1	0-3	1-1	0-2	0-0	2-4	2-3	1-3	0–1	0-0	0–1	0–1	3-1	0–1	3-2	1–0
Monterey Bay FC (MB)	SAN	OAK	OCO	PHX	DET	COS	LEX	NMU	MIA	RI	PHX	LOU	LEX	LVL	ELP	IND	OCO	TUL	TUL	SAC	ELP	SAN	OAK	COS	HFD	NMU	SAC	TBR	PGH	LVL
Monterey Bay FC (MB)	0-1	3-2	3-0	1-1	0-0	2-1	0-0	0-1	1-1	1-1	0-2	0-2	2-1	0-2	1-2	0-3	2-1	1-2	2-3	0-1	2-2	0-0	0-1	1-2	0-4	1-1	1–0	0-4	0-3	1-1
New Mexico United (NMU)	SAC	LVL	ELP	MIA	NCA	MB	ELP	PHX	OCO	OAK	COS	LEX	SAN	PGH	CHS	HFD	TUL	LVL	LOU	SAC	SAN	DET	TUL	MB	COS	LEX	PHX	OCO	OAK	RI
New Mexico United (NMU)	1-2	2-3	1-0	1-0	1-0	1-0	0-3	1-2	3-0	3-0	1-1	1-2	4-2	0-1	1-2	0-4	2-5	2-2	0-0	0-2	1-0	4-0	0-1	1-1	2–1	2-1	1-0	3-3	3-3	2-1
North Carolina FC (NCA)	PGH	LDN	TUL	CHS	IND	NMU	MIA	PGH	OCO	OAK	HFD	RI	LOU	CHS	BHM	IND	LOU	TBR	DET	LVL	HFD	LEX	ELP	TBR	MIA	BHM	DET	PHX	RI	LDN
North Carolina FC (NCA)	1–1	1-2	1-0	2-1	2-2	0-1	1-2	2-0	1-0	4-2	1-0	1-2	2-1	0-1	2-3	4-2	1-4	2-1	1-1	2–1	2-3	1-2	1-0	2-2	1–0	1-1	0-2	0–2	0-0	1–0
Oakland Roots SC (OAK)	OCO	MB	SAN	LVL	RI	TUL	OCO	SAC	SAN	NCA	NMU	ELP	COS	BHM	DET	PHX	LDN	COS	SAC	LEX	MB	PGH	CHS	TUL	PHX	ELP	HFD	LVL	NMU	LEX
Oakland Roots SC (OAK)	2-4	2-3	1-2	0-0	0-3	2-1	2-0	0-1	2-1	2-4	0–3	0-0	0-1	1-0	2–0	1-2	2-0	1-2	3-3	1-2	1–0	0-2	3–3	1-1	3–3	1-3	1-3	2-2	3-3	3–0
Orange County SC (OCO)	OAK	LEX	MB	LVL	SAC	OAK	TUL	NCA	NMU	COS	PHX	ELP	LDN	MB	LVL	PHX	PGH	COS	TUL	BHM	DET	LEX	SAN	CHS	SAC	ELP	NMU	SAN	LOU	IND
Orange County SC (OCO)	4-2	2-2	0-3	0-1	2-1	0-2	2-1	0-1	0-3	3-1	1-3	3-0	0-0	1-2	4-0	4–1	1-1	1-0	0-1	4-4	1–4	1-1	1-3	2–2	1-2	0-0	3-3	1-0	0-0	2–1
Phoenix Rising FC (PHX)	TUL	ELP	RI	MB	SAN	DET	SAC	COS	NMU	MB	LVL	OCO	TUL	CHS	LEX	OAK	OCO	BHM	LEX	TBR	COS	ELP	LVL	SAC	LDN	OAK	NMU	NCA	SAN	PGH
Phoenix Rising FC (PHX)	0-1	4-4	2-2	1-1	2-1	2-3	2-2	1-1	2-1	2-0	1-0	3-1	1-1	1-4	0-1	2-1	1-4	3-3	0-2	1-1	4–1	3-3	0-0	2-2	2-2	3–3	0-1	2–0	1-0	0-0
Pittsburgh Riverhounds SC (PGH)	NCA	SAN	HFD	BHM	CHS	LDN	NCA	LOU	COS	RI	DET	IND	TBR	NMU	LDN	DET	MIA	RI	OCO	CHS	BHM	TBR	OAK	LOU	HFD	LVL	MIA	IND	MB	PHX
Pittsburgh Riverhounds SC (PGH)	1-1	0-2	1-0	2-0	1-2	1-2	0-2	0-0	0-1	1-0	2-0	0-1	2-1	1-0	2-2	0-0	1–1	2-0	1-1	1-2	1-1	1-2	2-0	0–2	2–1	1-0	1-3	2-1	3-0	0-0
Rhode Island FC (RI)	CHS	PHX	LDN	OAK	DET	SAN	MB	BHM	TBR	PGH	MIA	LOU	NCA	SAC	BHM	IND	HFD	PGH	DET	LDN	HFD	CHS	LOU	IND	MIA	ELP	LVL	TBR	NCA	NMU
Rhode Island FC (RI)	0-2	2-2	0-2	3-0	0-2	0-0	1-1	1-0	3-0	0-1	0-1	1-2	2-1	0-2	1–1	0-1	0-0	0-2	1-0	0-0	0-3	1–0	0-1	1–0	1-0	2-2	3-1	5-0	0-0	1-2
Sacramento Republic FC (SAC)	NMU	COS	TUL	LOU	OCO	PHX	OAK	IND	LVL	TUL	SAN	BHM	RI	LVL	ELP	LEX	SAN	MB	OAK	ELP	NMU	TBR	PHX	COS	MB	OCO	HFD	LEX	CHS	MIA
Sacramento Republic FC (SAC)	2-1	2-2	0-1	1-1	1-2	2-2	1-0	1-1	5-0	0-1	0-0	0-1	2-0	2-0	3-0	0-0	3-1	1-0	3-3	0-1	2–0	2-0	2-2	2–0	0–1	2-1	2-3	2–2	1–0	0–1
San Antonio FC (SAN)	MB	PGH	OAK	LEX	PHX	MIA	COS	RI	OAK	CHS	TUL	LVL	SAC	NMU	ELP	TBR	SAC	LVL	LEX	MB	DET	NMU	LDN	OCO	BHM	COS	TUL	OCO	PHX	ELP
San Antonio FC (SAN)	1-0	2-0	2-1	3-2	1-2	1-2	3-2	0-0	1-2	0-4	1-1	3-0	0-0	2-4	2-1	1-0	1-3	1-1	0-1	0-0	1-1	0-1	5–2	3-1	0–0	0-1	0-2	0-1	0-1	5–2
Tampa Bay Rowdies (TBR)	LVL	TUL	MIA	CHS	LDN	LOU	BHM	CHS	RI	LEX	LOU	MIA	PGH	IND	SAN	HFD	IND	NCA	PHX	DET	PGH	SAC	COS	BHM	NCA	LDN	MB	RI	HFD	DET
Tampa Bay Rowdies (TBR)	0-1	0-1	2-1	1-2	1-2	1-2	2-2	1-3	0-3	1-1	1-2	2-1	1-2	3-1	0-1	1-0	3-1	1-2	1-1	0–2	2-1	0–2	3–3	4–1	2-2	2-2	4–0	0-5	3-2	1-1
FC Tulsa (TUL)	PHX	TBR	NCA	SAC	OAK	LVL	OCO	ELP	LEX	SAN	SAC	PHX	MIA	LVL	MB	LOU	LDN	MB	NMU	HFD	OCO	COS	BHM	NMU	OAK	IND	LEX	SAN	ELP	COS
FC Tulsa (TUL)	1-0	1-0	0-1	1-0	1-2	1-4	1-2	1-1	2-0	1-1	1-0	1-1	2-2	4-3	2-1	1-1	3–2	3–2	5–2	1-1	1-0	0-2	1-1	1-0	1-1	1–2	3-0	2-0	1-1	3-0

== Playoffs ==
=== Bracket ===
Conference Quarterfinals; November 1–2	Conference Semifinals; November 8
E1	Louisville City FC	0
E8	Detroit City FC	1
E8	Detroit City FC	0 (3)
E4	Pittsburgh Riverhounds SC	0 (4)
E4	Pittsburgh Riverhounds SC (p)	0 (4)
E5	Hartford Athletic	0 (2)
Eastern Conference
E3	North Carolina FC	1
E6	Loudoun United FC	0
E3	North Carolina FC	0
E7	Rhode Island FC	2
E2	Charleston Battery	0 (3)
E7	Rhode Island FC (p)	0 (5)
W1	FC Tulsa (a.e.t.)	1
W8	Colorado Springs Switchbacks FC	0
W1	FC Tulsa (a.e.t.)	1
W5	Phoenix Rising FC	0
W4	El Paso Locomotive FC	0
W5	Phoenix Rising FC	1
Western Conference
W3	New Mexico United	2
W6	San Antonio FC	0
W3	New Mexico United	2
W7	Orange County SC	1
W2	Sacramento Republic FC	0 (4)
W7	Orange County SC	0 (5)

Conference Finals; November 14–16
E4	Pittsburgh Riverhounds SC	1
E7	Rhode Island FC	0
W1	FC Tulsa	3
W3	New Mexico United	0

USL Championship Final; November 22
E4	Pittsburgh Riverhounds SC (p)	0 (5)
W1	FC Tulsa	0 (3)

=== Playoff Schedule ===
==== Conference Quarterfinals ====
November 1, 2025 East	Pittsburgh Riverhounds SC	0–0 (a.e.t.) (4–2 p)	Hartford Athletic	Pittsburgh, Pennsylvania
6:30 PM ET		Report		Stadium: Highmark Stadium; Attendance: 4,932; Referee: Elijio Arreguin
	Penalties
	Jacquesson (penalty scored); Mertz (penalty scored); Williams (penalty scored); Suber (penalty scored)		(penalty missed) Barry; (penalty scored) Farrell; (penalty scored) Panayotou; (penalty missed) Careaga

November 1, 2025 East	Louisville City FC	0–1	Detroit City FC	Louisville, Kentucky
7:00 PM ET		Report	Amoo-Mensah 34'	Stadium: Lynn Family Stadium; Attendance: 8,210; Referee: Greg Dopka

November 1, 2025 East	North Carolina FC	1–0	Loudoun United FC	Cary, North Carolina
7:30 PM ET	Anderson 6'	Report		Stadium: First Horizon Stadium at WakeMed Soccer Park; Attendance: 2,005; Referee: Natalie Simon

November 1, 2025 West	FC Tulsa	1–0 (a.e.t.)	Colorado Springs Switchbacks FC	Tulsa, Oklahoma
7:00 PM CT	Lukic 92'	Report		Stadium: Oneok Field; Attendance: 7,583; Referee: Ryan Carrigan

November 1, 2025 West	New Mexico United	2–0	San Antonio FC	Albuquerque, New Mexico
7:00 PM MT	Akale 20'; Noël 58'	Report		Stadium: Isotopes Park; Attendance: 8,287; Referee: Joshua Encarnación

November 1, 2025 West	El Paso Locomotive FC	0–1	Phoenix Rising FC	El Paso, Texas
7:30 PM MT		Report	Dennis 86' (pen.)	Stadium: Southwest University Park; Attendance: 3,469; Referee: Jeremy Scheer

November 2, 2025 East	Charleston Battery	0−0 (a.e.t.) (3−5 p)	Rhode Island FC	Mt. Pleasant, South Carolina
2:00 PM ET		Report		Stadium: Patriots Point Soccer Complex; Attendance: 4,532; Referee: Elton Garcia
	Penalties
	Molloy (penalty scored); Rubín (penalty scored); Rodríguez (penalty missed); Myers (penalty scored)		(penalty scored) Williams; (penalty scored) Diop; (penalty scored) Rodriguez; (penalty scored) Bacharach; (penalty scored) Mabika

November 2, 2025 West	Sacramento Republic FC	0–0 (a.e.t.) (4–5 p)	Orange County SC	Sacramento, California
6:00 PM PT		Report		Stadium: Heart Health Park; Attendance: 9,367; Referee: Nabil Bensalah
	Penalties
	Cicerone (penalty missed); Felipe (penalty missed); Ross (penalty scored); Bennett (penalty scored); Spaulding (penalty scored); Desmond (penalty scored); Gurr (penalty missed)		(penalty missed) Zubak; (penalty scored) Dunbar; (penalty scored) Pinto; (penalty missed) Latinovich; (penalty scored) Sylla; (penalty scored) Benalcazar; (penalty scored) Brewitt

==== Conference Semifinals ====
November 8, 2025 East	North Carolina FC	0–2	Rhode Island FC	Cary, North Carolina
7:00 PM ET		Report	Dikwa 81', 90+3'	Stadium: First Horizon Stadium at WakeMed Soccer Park; Attendance: 2,287; Referee: Joshua Encarnación

November 8, 2025 East	Pittsburgh Riverhounds SC	0–0 (a.e.t.) (4–3 p)	Detroit City FC	Pittsburgh, Pennsylvania
7:30 PM ET		Report		Stadium: Highmark Stadium; Attendance: 6,220; Referee: Natalie Simon
	Penalties
	Jacquesson (penalty scored); Mertz (penalty missed); Williams (penalty scored); Suber (penalty scored); Ydrach (penalty scored)		(penalty scored) Guenzatti; (penalty scored) Hernandez-Foster; (penalty missed) Amoo-Mensah; (penalty missed) Williams; (penalty scored) Bryant

November 8, 2025 West	FC Tulsa	1–0 (a.e.t.)	Phoenix Rising FC	Tulsa, Oklahoma
8:00 PM ET	Lukic 120+2'	Report		Stadium: Oneok Field; Attendance: 7,917; Referee: Brandon Stevis

November 8, 2025 West	New Mexico United	2–1	Orange County SC	Albuquerque, New Mexico
9:00 PM ET	Hurst 49'; Harris 90+4'	Report	Pinto 68'	Stadium: Isotopes Park; Attendance: 10,150; Referee: Elton García

==== Conference Finals ====
November 15 East	Pittsburgh Riverhounds SC	1–0	Rhode Island FC	Pittsburgh, Pennsylvania
6:30 PM	Mertz 55'	Report		Stadium: Highmark Stadium; Attendance: 6,745; Referee: Nabil Bensalah

November 15 West	FC Tulsa	3–0	New Mexico United	Tulsa, Oklahoma
8:30 PM	Calheira 39', 57'; Webber 76'	Report		Stadium: Oneok Field; Attendance: 9,180; Referee: Greg Dopka

==== USL Championship Final ====
November 22 Final	FC Tulsa	0–0 (a.e.t.) (3–5 p)	Pittsburgh Riverhounds SC	Tulsa, Oklahoma
12:00 PM EST		Report		Stadium: Oneok Field; Attendance: 9,507; Referee: Elijio Arreguin
	Penalties
	Calheira (penalty scored); Lukic (penalty missed); Colli (penalty scored); Batista (penalty scored)		(penalty scored) Jacquesson; (penalty scored) Mertz; (penalty scored) Boone; (penalty scored) Suber; (penalty scored) Ydrach

== Average home attendances ==
Ranked from highest to lowest average attendance.

Team	GP	Total	High	Low	Average
Sacramento Republic FC	15	147,020	11,569	8,176	9,801
Louisville City FC	15	146,264	13,611	8,147	9,751
New Mexico United	15	142,913	11,581	6,713	9,528
Indy Eleven	15	141,969	10,375	7,017	9,465
Rhode Island FC	15	133,713	10,749	7,072	8,914
Oakland Roots SC	15	125,632	26,575	4,765	8,375
Colorado Springs Switchbacks FC	15	108,563	8,023	6,059	7,238
San Antonio FC	15	95,493	8,164	3,735	6,366
Detroit City FC	15	93,440	7,235	5,047	6,229
El Paso Locomotive FC	15	82,709	8,432	4,049	5,514
Pittsburgh Riverhounds SC	15	74,479	6,115	3,808	4,965
Hartford Athletic	15	73,707	5,500	4,034	4,914
Tampa Bay Rowdies	15	73,614	7,326	3,692	4,908
Phoenix Rising FC	15	73,018	7,563	3,757	4,868
Orange County SC	15	68,627	5,500	3,020	4,575
Birmingham Legion FC	15	68,106	6,920	2,762	4,540
Lexington SC	15	63,735	6,012	3,471	4,249
Charleston Battery	15	59,133	5,080	2,480	3,942
Monterey Bay FC	15	50,098	5,160	2,420	3,340
FC Tulsa	15	47,654	4,012	2,289	3,177
Las Vegas Lights FC	15	42,048	4,570	1,851	2,803
North Carolina FC	15	38,058	3,774	1,472	2,537
Loudoun United FC	15	34,991	4,204	583	2,333
Miami FC	15	17,491	2,033	768	1,166
Total	360	2,002,663	26,575	583	5,563

== Player statistics ==
As of October 25, 2025

=== Goals ===
Rank	Player	Club	Goals
1	(Liberia) Peter Wilson	Oakland Roots SC	18
2	(United States) Cal Jennings	Charleston Battery	17
3	(United States) Taylor Calheira	FC Tulsa	15
3	(United States) MD Myers	Charleston Battery	15
5	(Argentina) Francisco Bonfiglio	Miami FC	14
5	(Haiti) Woobens Pacius	Tampa Bay Rowdies	14
7	(United States) Phillip Goodrum	Louisville City FC	13
8	(Egypt) Abdellatif Aboukoura	Loudoun United FC	12
8	(Saint Vincent and the Grenadines) Kyle Edwards	Hartford Athletic	12
10	(Mexico) Jorge Hernandez	San Antonio FC	11
10	(United States) Ethan Zubak	Orange County SC	11
10	(Haiti) Ronaldo Damus	Birmingham Legion FC	11

=== Hat-tricks ===
Player	Team	Against	Score	Date
(Colombia) Wilmer Cabrera Jr.	El Paso Locomotive FC	New Mexico United	3–0 (H)	May 3
(United States) Phillip Goodrum	Louisville City FC	Birmingham Legion FC	4–2 (H)	June 14

Notes

(H) – Home team
(A) – Away team

Scored four goals.

=== Assists ===
Rank	Player	Club	Assists
1	(United States) Aodhan Quinn	Indy Eleven	11
2	(Colombia) Juan Torres	Charleston Battery	10
2	(Ghana) Hope Avayevu	Phoenix Rising FC	10
4	(United States) Taylor Davila	Louisville City FC	9
5	(United States) Chris Hegardt	Orange County SC	8
5	(France) Florian Valot	Loudoun United FC	8
5	(United States) Michael Maldonado	North Carolina FC	8
8	(United States) Ben Mines	Loudoun United	7
8	(United States) Gennaro Nigro	Las Vegas Lights FC	7
8	(Brazil) Gabriel Torres	El Paso Locomotive FC	7

=== Clean sheets ===
Rank	Player	Club	Clean sheets
1	(United States) Danny Vitiello	Sacramento Republic FC	12
2	(Spain) Koke Vegas	Rhode Island FC	11
2	(United States) Eric Dick	Pittsburgh Riverhounds SC	11
4	(Cuba) Raiko Arozarena	Las Vegas Lights FC	10
4	(United States) Damian Las	Louisville City FC	10
6	(Cameroon) Antony Siaha	Hartford Athletic	9
7	(United States) Kendall McIntosh	Oakland Roots SC	7
7	(United States) Johan Peñaranda	FC Tulsa	7
7	(United States) Colin Shutler	Orange County SC	7
7	(United States) Luis Zamudio	Charleston Battery	7

== League awards ==
=== Individual awards ===
Award	Winner	Team	Reason	Ref.
Golden Boot	(Liberia) Peter Wilson	Oakland Roots SC	18 goals in 28 goals	
Golden Glove	(United States) Damian Las	Louisville City FC	10 shutouts; 0.70 goals against average; 80 save percentage	
Golden Playmaker	(United States) Aodhan Quinn	Indy Eleven	11 assists	
Goalkeeper of the Year	(United States) Damian Las	Louisville City FC	10 shutouts; 0.79 goals against average; 80 save percentage	
Defender of the Year	(New Zealand) Kyle Adams	Louisville City FC	159 duels overall at a 66% success rate	
Coach of the Year	(United States) Danny Cruz	Louisville City FC	Led Louisville to the second-straight Players' Shield title	
Young Player of the Year	(Egypt) Abdellatif Aboukoura	Loudoun United FC	12 goals; 2 assists	
Player of the Year	(United States) Taylor Davila	Louisville City FC	4 goals, 9 assists, 190 recoveries, 40 tackles won	

=== All-league teams ===
First team
Goalkeeper	Defenders	Midfielders	Forwards
(United States) Damian Las (LOU)	(New Zealand) Kyle Adams (LOU) (United States) Joshua Jones (LOU) (United States) Aiden McFadden (LOU) (United States) Sean Suber (PIT)	(United States) Taylor Davila (LOU) (Republic of Ireland) Aaron Molloy (CHS) (Colombia) Juan David Torres (CHS)	(United States) Taylor Calheira (TUL) (United States) Cal Jennings (CHS) (Liberia) Peter Wilson (OAK)

Second team
Goalkeeper	Defenders	Midfielders	Forwards
(United States) Danny Vitiello (SAC)	(United States) Lamar Batista (TUL) (England) Jack Gurr (SAC) (United States) Talen Maples (NM) (United States) Sean Totsch (LOU)	(Ghana) Hope Avayevu (PHX) (Mexico) Jorge Hernández (SA) (United States) Aodhan Quinn (IND)	(Egypt) Abdellatif Aboukoura (LDN) (Argentina) Francisco Bonfiglio (MIA) (United States) MD Myers (CHS)

=== Midseason awards ===
Goalkeeper of the Year		Defender of the Year		Coach of the Year		Young Player of the Year		Player of the Year		References
(Spain) Nico Campuzano	Monterey Bay FC	(United States) Talen Maples	New Mexico United	(United States) Danny Cruz	Louisville City FC	(United States) Collin Smith	Phoenix Rising FC	(Egypt) Abdellatif Aboukoura	Loudoun United FC	

=== Monthly awards ===
Month	Player of the Month			Coach of the Month		References
Month	Player	Club	Position	Coach	Club	References
March	(Egypt) Abdellatif Aboukoura	Loudoun United FC	Forward	(United States) Carlos Llamosa	San Antonio FC	
April	(South Africa) Darren Smith	Detroit City FC	Forward	(United States) Ryan Martin	Loudoun United FC	
May	(Colombia) Andy Cabrera	El Paso Locomotive FC	Forward	(United States) John Bradford	North Carolina FC	
June	(United States) Phillip Goodrum	Louisville City FC	Forward	(United States) Danny Cruz	Louisville City FC	
July	(United States) Danny Vitiello	Sacramento Republic FC	Goalkeeper	(United States) Luke Spencer	FC Tulsa	
August	(United States) Jansen Wilson	Louisville City FC	Midfielder	(United States) Brendan Burke	Hartford Athletic	
September	(Mexico) Jorge Hernández	San Antonio FC	Midfielder	(United States) Danny Cruz	Louisville City FC	
October	(Liberia) Peter Wilson	Oakland Roots SC	Forward	(United States) Luke Spencer	FC Tulsa	

=== Weekly awards ===
Player of the Week
Week	Player	Club	Position	Reason	Ref.
1	(Scotland) Lewis Jamieson	Sacramento Republic FC	Forward	2 goals vs New Mexico	
2	(El Salvador) Amando Moreno	El Paso Locomotive FC	Forward	2 goals vs Phoenix	
3	(United States) Ilijah Paul	Monterey Bay FC	Forward	2 goals, 1 assist vs Orange County	
4	(Egypt) Abdellatif Aboukoura	Loudoun United	Forward	2 goals vs Rhode Island	
5	(Brazil) Gabriel Torres	El Paso Locomotive FC	Midfielder	2 assists vs Lexington	
6	(South Africa) Darren Smith	Detroit City FC	Forward	2 goals in 2 minutes vs Phoenix	
7	(United States) MD Myers	Charleston Battery	Forward	2 goals in 5 minutes vs Indy	
8/9	(Colombia) Andy Cabrera	El Paso Locomotive FC	Forward	First ever hat trick for the club vs New Mexico	
10	(United States) MD Myers	Charleston Battery	Forward	2 goals in 9 minutes vs Tampa Bay	
11	(United States) Cal Jennings	Charleston Battery	Forward	2 goals vs San Antonio	
12	(Colombia) Andy Cabrera	El Paso Locomotive FC	Forward	2 goals vs Las Vegas	
13/14	(United States) Robbie Mertz	Pittsburgh Riverhounds SC	Midfielder	1 goal, 1 Assist vs Detroit	
15	(United States) Phillip Goodrum	Louisville City FC	Forward	Hat Trick vs Birmingham	
16	(United States) Marlon Vargas	Sacramento Republic FC	Midfielder	1 goal, 1 Assist vs San Antonio	
17/18	(Scotland) Jack Blake	Indy Eleven	Midfielder	2 assists, 1 goal for the week	
19	(United States) Danny Trejo	Birmingham Legion FC	Forward	2 goals vs North Carolina	
20	(United States) Brooks Thompson	Lexington SC	Goalkeeper	5 save shutout vs Sacramento	
22	(Senegal) Mamadou Dieng	Hartford Athletic	Forward	2 goals vs New Mexico	
23	(United States) Taylor Davila	Louisville City FC	Midfielder	2 goal, 1 assist vs Charleston	
24	(Guatemala) Arquímides Ordóñez	Loudoun United FC	Forward	2 goals vs Indy off the bench	
25	(United States) Owen Presthus	Hartford Athletic	Midfielder	1 goal in Debut vs Rhode Island	
26	(Jamaica) Khori Bennett	Sacramento Republic FC	Forward	2 goals vs New Mexico	
27	(Sierra Leone) Augustine Williams	Pittsburgh Riverhounds SC	Forward	2 goals vs Oakland	
28	(Liberia) Peter Wilson	Oakland Roots SC	Forward	2 goals off the bench vs Charleston	
29	(France) Paul Marie	Tampa Bay Rowdies	Midfielder	2 goals, 1 assist for the week	
30	(England) Charlie Dennis	Phoenix Rising FC	Midfielder	2 goals vs Oakland	
31	(Argentina) Tobías Zárate	Miami FC	Forward	2 goals vs Pittsburgh	
32	(United States) Chris Hegardt	Orange County SC	Forward	3 assists vs New Mexico	
33	(United States) Peter Wilson	Oakland Roots	Forward	2 goals, 1 assist vs New Mexico	
34	(United States) Taylor Calheira	FC Tulsa	Forward	2 goals vs Colorado Springs	

Goal of the Week
Week	Player	Club	Opponent	Ref.
1	(United States) Nico Benalcazar	Orange County SC	Oakland Roots SC	
2	(Senegal) Mohamed Traore	Phoenix Rising FC	El Paso Locomotive FC	
3	(Guatemala) Damian Rivera	Phoenix Rising FC	Rhode Island FC	
4	(Mexico) Carlos Guzmán	Monterey Bay FC	Phoenix Rising FC	
5	(Curaçao) Jearl Margaritha	Phoenix Rising FC	San Antonio FC	
6	(Ecuador) Jeciel Cedeno	Detroit City FC	Phoenix Rising FC	
7	(Serbia) Stefan Lukić	FC Tulsa	Las Vegas Lights FC	
8/9	(France) Louis Perez	North Carolina FC	Pittsburgh Riverhounds SC	
10	(United States) Joe Brito	Rhode Island FC	Monterey Bay FC	
11	(United States) Clay Holstad	Rhode Island FC	Tampa Bay Rowdies	
12	(Colombia) Juan David Torres	Charleston Battery	Detroit City FC	
13/14	(United States) Marlon Vargas	New Mexico United	Colorado Springs Switchbacks	
15	(France) Ihsan Sacko	Phoenix Rising FC	FC Tulsa	
16	(Argentina) Matías Romero	Miami FC	Charleston Battery	
17/18	(United States) Noah Fuson	Rhode Island FC	Birmingham Legion	
19	(Brazil) Marcos Serrato	FC Tulsa	Las Vegas Lights FC	
20	(United States) Chris Hegardt	Orange County SC	Las Vegas Lights FC	
22	(United States) Ethan Zubak	Orange County SC	Phoenix Rising FC	
23	(Brazil) Marcos Serrato	FC Tulsa	New Mexico United	
24	(United States) Russell Cicerone	Sacramento Republic FC	Oakland Roots SC	
25	(Senegal) Ates Diouf	Detroit City FC	Tampa Bay Rowdies	
26	(United States) Aiden McFadden	Louisville City FC	Indy Eleven	
27	(United States) Tyler Clegg	Colorado Springs Switchbacks	Monterey Bay FC	
28	(United States) Jack Panayotou	Hartford Athletic	Monterey Bay FC	
29	(United States) Nico Benalcazar	Orange County SC	San Antonio FC	
30	(United States) Adrian Rebollar	Monterey Bay FC	Sacramento Republic FC	
31	(South Africa) Jamie Webber	FC Tulsa	Lexington SC	
32	(England) Jack Gurr	Sacramento Republic FC	Hartford Athletic	
33	(Serbia) Stefan Lukić	FC Tulsa	El Paso Locomotive FC	
34	(Colombia) Santiago Patiño	San Antonio FC	El Paso Locomotive FC	

Save of the Week
1	(Spain) Nico Campuzano	Monterey Bay FC	San Antonio FC
2	(United States) Luis Zamudio	Charleston Battery	Rhode Island FC
3	(Spain) Nico Campuzano	Monterey Bay FC	Orange County SC
4	(Spain) Nico Campuzano	Monterey Bay FC	Phoenix Rising FC
5	(France) Hugo Fauroux	Loudoun United FC	Hartford Athletic
6	(France) Hugo Fauroux	Loudoun United FC	Tampa Bay Rowdies
7	(United States) Johan Peñaranda	FC Tulsa	Las Vegas Lights FC
8/9	(Spain) Koke Vegas	Rhode Island FC	San Antonio FC
10	(Jamaica) Jahmali Waite	El Paso Locomotive FC	FC Tulsa
11	(Jamaica) Jahmali Waite	El Paso Locomotive FC	Indy Eleven
12	(Spain) Nico Campuzano	Monterey Bay FC	Louisville City FC
13/14	(United States) Sebastián Mora-Mora	El Paso Locomotive FC	Oakland Roots SC
15	(Mexico) Fernando Rafael Delgado	Birmingham Legion FC	Louisville City FC
16	(Mexico) Carlos Herrera	Detroit City FC	Miami FC
17/18	(United States) Brooks Thompson	Lexington SC	Phoenix Rising FC
19	(United States) Danny Vitiello	Sacramento Republic FC	El Paso Locomotive FC
20	(United States) Brooks Thompson	Lexington SC	Sacramento Republic FC
22	(Australia) Jackson Lee	Rhode Island FC	Pittsburgh Riverhounds SC
23	(United States) Hunter Sulte	Indy Eleven	Detroit City FC
24	(Jamaica) Jahmali Waite	El Paso Locomotive FC	Monterey Bay FC
25	(United States) Danny Vitiello	Sacramento Republic FC	El Paso Locomotive FC
26	(United States) Danny Faundez	Louisville City FC	Indy Eleven
27	(United States) Hunter Sulte	Indy Eleven	Charleston Battery
28	(Germany) Patrick Rakovsky	Phoenix Rising FC	Sacramento Republic FC
29	(Germany) Oliver Semmle	North Carolina FC	Tampa Bay Rowdies
30	(Spain) Nico Campuzano	Monterey Bay FC	Sacramento Republic FC
31	(Spain) Nico Campuzano	Monterey Bay FC	Tampa Bay Rowdies
32	(Argentina) Nicolás Campisi	Miami FC	Louisville City FC
33	(United States) Hunter Sulte	Indy Eleven	Loudoun United FC
34	(United States) Danny Vitiello	Sacramento Republic FC	Charleston Battery

Team of the Week
Week	Goalkeeper	Defenders	Midfielders	Forwards	Bench	Coach	Ref.
1	(United States) Peñaranda (TUL)	(United States) Erlandson (LDN) (United States) Bryant (DET) (United States) Hafferty (LEX) (United States) Totsch (LOU)	(Egypt) Aboukoura (LDN) (United States) Scott (OC) (Sierra Leone) Daroma (ELP)	(Scotland) Jamieson (SAC) (United States) Ryan (LDN) (Portugal) Pacheco (SAN)	(Switzerland) Ammeter (LVL) (United States) Wiedt (DET) (United States) Taintor (SAN) (United States) Benalcazar (OC) (Norway) Doghman (OC) (United States) Cicerone (TBR) (El Salvador) Moreno (ELP)	(United States) Terry Boss (LEX)	
2	(United States) Zamudio (CHS)	(United States) Batista (TUL) (United States) Hogan (IND) (Brazil) Torres (ELP)	(Ghana) Avayevu (PHX) (Malawi) Malango (MB) (Scotland) Blake (IND) (Egypt) Aboukoura (LDN)	(United States) Jennings (CHS) (El Salvador) Moreno (ELP) (United States) Avila (ELP)	(United States) Peñaranda (TUL) (Colombia) Medranda (SAN) (Colombia) Sinisterra (OAK) (Mexico) Hernandez (SAN) (Colombia) JD Torres (CHS) (Scotland) Hurst (NMU) (France) Valot (LDN)	(United States) Ben Pirmann (CHS)	
3	(United States) Las (LOU)	(United States) Moon (TBR) (England) Craig (NC) (United States) Ryden (NMU)	(Cuba) Rendón (IND) (United States) Hernandez-Foster (BHM) (United States) Davila (LOU) (Denmark) Søjberg (MB)	(United States) Cicerone (TBR) (United States) Paul (MB) (United States) Williams (RI)	(Spain) Campuzano (MB) (United States) Biasi (PIT) (England) Rogers (TUL) (Republic of the Congo) Etou (PIT) (United States) Epps (LEX) (United States) Dhillon (COS) (Guatemala) Rivera (PHX)	(England) Jordan Stewart (MB)	
4	(Greece) Tambakis (NMU)	(Mexico) Guzmán (MB) (Puerto Rico) Ydrach (PIT) (Ghana) Ackwei (ELP) (England) Rogers (TUL)	(Mexico) Hernandez (SAN) (Italy) Micaletto (COS) (Colombia) Medranda (SAN) (United States) Rebollar (MB)	(Egypt) Aboukoura (LDN) (Brazil) Fernando (NMU)	(United States) Las (LOU) (United States) Kleemann (SAC) (United States) Mertz (PIT) (United States) Skundrich (LDN) (Jamaica) Foster (IND) (United States) Serrano (LOU) (United States) Conway (NC)	(United States) Luke Spencer (TUL)	
5	(Mexico) Herrera (DET)	(Mexico) Ortiz (ELP) (Portugal) Santos (LDN) (United States) Kleemann (SAC) (United States) Tingey (LDN)	(Brazil) Torres (ELP) (United States) Holstad (RI) (Rwanda) Kwizera (RI)	(Curaçao) Margaritha (PHX) (Cameroon) Dikwa (RI) (Jamaica) Foster (IND)	(Spain) Campuzano (MB) (United States) Nigro (LVL) (Republic of Ireland) Donovan (NC) (France) Valot (LDN) (England) Allan (CHS) (United States) Williams (RI) (United States) Jennings (CHS)	(Norway) Pa-Modou Kah (PHX)	
6	(United States) Hamid (MIA)	(United States) Bravo (OAK) (United States) Ryden (NMU) (United States) Knutson (MIA)	(United States) Rebollar (MB) (Republic of Ireland) Molloy (CHS) (Canada) Chapman (DET) (Portugal) Santos (LDN)	(United States) Prentice (OAK) (Haiti) Damus (BHM) (South Africa) Smith (DET)	(United States) Shutler (OC) (Nigeria) Akinyode (MIA) (United States) Doody (OC) (Colombia) JD Torres (CHS) (Ghana) Avayevu (PHX) (Egypt) Aboukoura (LDN) (Ecuador) Cedeno (DET)	(Argentina) Gastón Maddoni (MIA)	
7	(United States) Hamid (MIA)	(Mexico) Damm (OAK) (United States) Knutson (MIA) (England) Rogers (TUL)	(Mexico) Rodríguez (CHS) (United States) Coronado (ELP) (United States) Davila (LOU) (United States) Gavilanes (MIA)	(South Africa) Smith (DET) (United States) Myers (CHS) (United States) Calheira (TUL)	(Mexico) Romero (COS) (Sierra Leone) Samadia (HFD) (United States) Bravo (OAK) (Egypt) Aboukoura (LDN) (Germany) Wanner (SAC) (France) Cabral (PHX) (Liberia) Wilson (OAK)	(United States) Luke Spencer (TUL)	
8/9	(Cuba) Arozarena (LVL)	(United States) Benalcazar (OC) (Ivory Coast) Landry (CHS) (United States) Knutson (MIA)	(Brazil) Torres (ELP) (France) Perez (NC) (Colombia) JD Torres (CHS) (Burundi) Niyongabire (TBR)	(Colombia) A. Cabrera (ELP) (Ghana) Amoh (IND) (Switzerland) MacKinnon (OC)	(Mexico) Sánchez (SAN) (United States) Smith (OAK) (United States) Kleemann (SAC) (Mexico) Rodríguez (CHS) (Sierra Leone) Daroma (ELP) (United States) Wilson (LOU) (Argentina) Bonfiglio (MIA)	(Colombia) Wílmer Cabrera (ELP)	
10	(United States) McGuire (NC)	(Haiti) Pierre (TUL) (United States) Mahoney (COS) (United States) Tingey (LDN)	(France) Valot (LDN) (Mexico) Rodríguez (CHS) (Egypt) Aboukoura (LDN) (Mexico) Hernandez (SAN)	(United States) Jennings (CHS) (Ghana) Avayevu (PHX) (United States) Myers (CHS)	(Cameroon) Siaha (HFD) (Dominican Republic) Dollenmayer (ELP) (Republic of Ireland) Desmond (SAC) (England) Craig (NC) (England) Allan (CHS) (Liberia) Wilson (OAK) (United States) Ryan (LDN)	(Norway) Pa-Modou Kah (PHX)	
11	(United States) Shakes (NMU)	(United States) Batista (TUL) (United States) Maples (NMU) (England) Gurr (SAC)	(United States) Maldonado (NC) (El Salvador) Calvillo (ELP) (United States) Scearce (PHX) (Brazil) Fernando (NMU)	(Colombia) A. Cabrera (ELP) (Colombia) Herrera (SAC) (United States) Jennings (CHS)	(Spain) Vegas (RI) (Mexico) Ortiz (ELP) (United States) Real (COS) (Puerto Rico) Servania (NC) (United States) Damm (TUL) (Saint Vincent and the Grenadines) Anderson (NC) (United States) Calheira (TUL)	(Bermuda) Khano Smith (RI)	
12	(Greece) Tambakis (NMU)	(United States) Totsch (LOU) (France) Vacter (PIT) (United States) Gloster (NMU)	(Colombia) JD Torres (CHS) (Sierra Leone) Daroma (ELP) (United States) Hegardt (OC) (United States) Davila (LOU)	(Colombia) A. Cabrera (ELP) (United States) Jennings (CHS) (United States) Akale (NMU)	(United States) Dick (PIT) (United States) Stoneman (RI) (United States) Ruiz (ELP) (United States) Benalcazar (OC) (Brazil) Fernandes (TBR) (United States) Avila (ELP) (Canada) Pasher (BHM)	(United States) Ben Pirmann (CHS)	
13/14	(United States) Sulte (IND)	(United States) Turner (LDN) (United States) Nigro (LVL) (United States) Ricketts (MIA)	(South Africa) Webber (TUL) (United States) Mertz (PIT) (United States) Davila (LOU) (United States) Barnes (PIT)	(Saint Vincent and the Grenadines) Edwards (HFD) (Jamaica) Williams (IND) (Poland) Formella (PHX)	(Germany) Rakovsky (PHX) (Nigeria) Akinyode (MIA) (United States) Buckmaster (SAN) (Sweden) Larsson (MB) (Colombia) Paredes (SAN) (Denmark) Søjberg (MB) (United States) Myers (CHS)	(Norway) Pa-Modou Kah (PHX)	
15	(Germany) Rakovsky (PHX)	(England) Rogers (TUL) (United States) Ofeimu (IND) (Ivory Coast) Landry (CHS)	(Egypt) Aboukoura (LDN) (Scotland) M. Rodriguez (RI) (United States) Davila (LOU) (England) Hilton (TBR)	(United States) J. Rodriguez (LVL) (United States) Goodrum (LOU) (United States) Zubak (OC)	(Mexico) Herrera (MIA) (Cameroon) Essengue (PHX) (United States) Mahoney (COS) (United States) Nigro (LVL) (United States) Zengue (LEX) (United States) Myers (CHS) (United States) Ryan (LDN)	(United States) Terry Boss (LEX)	
16	(Mexico) Herrera (DET)	(United States) Lindsey (NMU) (United States) Greene (OAK) (Brazil) Torres (ELP)	(United States) Vargas (NMU) (Mexico) Rodríguez (CHS) (Brazil) Fernando (NMU) (Ecuador) Cedeno (DET)	(United States) Akale (NMU) (Saint Vincent and the Grenadines) Edwards (HFD) (Colombia) Cabrera (ELP)	(United States) Vitiello (SAC) (United States) Sundstrom (NC) (Ghana) Ackwei (ELP) (Colombia) JD Torres (CHS) (United States) Maldonado (NC) (Senegal) Dieng (NMU) (Sierra Leone) Williams (PIT)	(United States) John Bradford (NC)	
17/18	(United States) Van Oekel (BHM)	(Scotland) St Clair (TUL) (Georgia (country)) Margvelashvili (OAK) (United States) Blackstock (CHS)	(Nigeria) Adedokun (LEX) (Scotland) Blake (IND) (United States) Elmasnaouy (OAK) (United States) Mertz (PIT)	(Argentina) Bonfiglio (MIA) (United States) Cicerone (TBR) (Australia) Armenakas (OAK)	(France) Fauroux (LDN) (United States) Turnbull (BHM) (United States) Crognale (SAN) (United States) Lopez (SAC) (United States) Quinn (IND) (United States) Willey (SAC) (United States) Goodrum (LOU)	(United States) Bob Lilley (PIT)	
19	(United States) Namani (SAN)	(United States) Robinson (MB) (United States) Maples (NMU) (United States) Sargeant (LEX)	(Mexico) Benítez (SAC) (Ivory Coast) Landry (CHS) (Brazil) Cerato (TUL) (United States) Smart (LVL)	(Mexico) Trejo (BHM) (Colombia) Herrera (SAC) (Haiti) Damus (BHM)	(United States) Vitiello (SAC) (United States) Presthus (HFD) (United States) Willey (SAC) (Canada) Pasher (BHM) (United States) Mertz (PIT) (United States) Calheira (TUL) (Senegal) Diouf (MEM)	(Scotland) Neill Collins (SAC)	
20	(United States) Thompson (LEX)	(Norway) Doghman (OC) (Georgia (country)) Margvelashvili (OAK) (United States) Akpunonu (CHS)	(United States) Hegardt (OC) (Republic of Ireland) Molloy (CHS) (United States) Maldonado (NC) (Mexico) Rodríguez (CHS) (France) Perez (NC)	(United States) Jennings (CHS) (Japan) War (OC)	(United States) McIntosh (OAK) (United States) Suber (PIT) (Trinidad and Tobago) Hackshaw (OAK) (Brazil) Dolabella (NC) (Italy) Micaletto (COS) (Haiti) Pacius (TBR) (United States) Conway (NC)	(England) Danny Stone (OC)	
22	(United States) Las (LOU)	(Norway) Doghman (OC) (United States) Mahoney (COS) (United States) Jones (LOU)	(Brazil) Torres (ELP) (Ghana) Avayevu (PHX) (El Salvador) Calvillo (ELP) (United States) Hegardt (OCO)	(El Salvador) Moreno (ELP) (Senegal) Dieng (HFD) (Colombia) A. Cabrera (ELP)	(United States) Dick (PIT) (Sierra Leone) Samadia (HFD) (United States) O'Connor-Ward (COS) (Jamaica) Lambert (LOU) (Argentina) Parano (SAC) (Haiti) Pacius (TBR) (England) Gleadle (LOU)	(United States) Danny Cruz (LOU)	
23	(Cameroon) Siaha (HFD)	(United States) Damm (TUL) (France) Vacter (PIT) (Uruguay) Tregarthen (BHM)	(United States) Wilson (LOU) (Argentina) Berron (SAN) (United States) Davila (LOU) (United States) Lopez (SAC)	(Norway) Fjeldberg (COS) (Senegal) Dieng (HFD) (United States) Dalou (TUL)	(Spain) Vegas (RI) (United States) Suber (PIT) (England) Rogers (TUL) (Scotland) Kelly (OC) (Democratic Republic of the Congo) Ngalina (HFD) (Nigeria) Adedokun (LEX) (United States) Goodrum (LOU)	(United States) Luke Spencer (TUL)	
24	(United States) Zamudio (CHS)	(United States) Rizzo (PHX) (United States) Benalcazar (OC) (Georgia (country)) Margvelashvili (OAK)	(United States) Lopez (SAC) (United States) Davila (LOU) (United States) McFadden (LOU) (United States) Kobe Hernandez-Foster (DET)	(El Salvador) Sorto (ELP) (Guatemala) Ordóñez (LDN) (United States) Goodrum (LOU)	(United States) Shutler (OC) (Sierra Leone) Samadia (HFD) (United States) McCabe (LDN) (Mexico) Rodríguez (CHS) (United States) Griffin (PIT) (France) Noël (NMU) (Guatemala) Rubín (CHS)	(United States) Benny Feilhaber (OAK)	
25	(United States) Shakes (NMU)	(United States) Sheldon (DET) (Jamaica) Scarlett (HFD) (United States) Sargeant (LEX)	(Mexico) Rodríguez (CHS) (Scotland) Blake (IND) (United States) Presthus (HFD) (United States) Hafferty (LEX) (Brazil) Torres (ELP)	(Guatemala) Rubín (CHS) (Argentina) Careaga (HFD)	(United States) Saldaña (DET) (Haiti) Pierre (TUL) (Somalia) Omar (SAN) (Ghana) Avayevu (PHX) (England) Williams (DET) (Brazil) Dolabella (NC) (United States) Gannon (LVL)	(United States) Brendan Burke (HFD)	
26	(Spain) Vegas (RI)	(Puerto Rico) Ruiz (ELP) (United States) Jones (LOU) (England) Shashoua (BHM)	(United States) Guimaraes (OC) (Argentina) Careaga (HFD) (Canada) Doner (OAK) (Uruguay) Tregarthen (BHM)	(Antigua and Barbuda) Daley (BHM) (Jamaica) Bennett (SAC) (France) Sacko (PHX)	(Cuba) Arozarena (LVL) (United States) Greene (OAK) (Jamaica) Lambert (LOU) (United States) Lopez (SAC) (Saint Kitts and Nevis) Somersall (NC) (Guatemala) Ordóñez (LDN) (Haiti) Pacius (TBR)	(United States) Ryan Martin (LDN)	
27	(France) Fauroux (LDN)	(United States) Rufe (BHM) (United States) Clegg (COS) (United States) Batista (TUL)	(Scotland) Blake (IND) (France) Valot (LDN) (Brazil) Firmino (LEX) (United States) Mines (LDN)	(United States) Jennings (CHS) (Sierra Leone) Williams (PIT) (United States) Cicerone (SAC)	(United States) Sulte (IND) (Spain) Bacharach (RI) (United States) Totsch (LOU) (Republic of Ireland) Molloy (CHS) (Puerto Rico) Echevarria (COS) (United States) Mertz (PIT) (South Africa) Smith (DET)	(Scotland) Neill Collins (SAC)	
28	(Cuba) Arozarena (LVL)	(United States) Benalcazar (OC) (Haiti) Pierre (TUL) (United States) Sargeant (LEX)	(Mexico) Hernandez (SAN) (Jamaica) Lambert (LOU) (Colombia) Medranda (SAN) (United States) Anderson (HFD)	(Panama) Tejada (COS) (Saint Vincent and the Grenadines) Edwards (HFD) (Liberia) Wilson (OAK)	(Argentina) Campisi (MIA) (Palestine) Al-Qaq (NC) (United States) Seymore (NMU) (France) Marie ( TBR) (France) Noël (NMU) (United States) Jennings (CHS) (Colombia) Patiño (SAN)	(United States) Brendan Burke (HFD)	
29	(United States) Vitiello (SAC)	(United States) Schaefer (IND) (United States) Jones (LOU) (United States) Benalcazar (OC)	(Mexico) Hernandez (SAN) (France) Marie (TBR) (United States) Mines (LDN) (Saint Kitts and Nevis) Somersall (NC)	(United States) Calheira (TUL) (Venezuela) Arteaga (TBR) (United States) Wilson (LOU)	(Cuba) Arozarena (LVL) (United States) Ofeimu (IND) (Republic of Ireland) Desmond (SAC) (United States) Quinn (IND) (United States) Gnaulati (MB) (United States) Hernandez (SAN) (United States) Jennings (CHS)	(United States) Danny Cruz (LOU)	
30	(United States) Berner (HFD)	(Palestine) Al-Qaq (NC) (United States) Totsch (LOU) (France) Vacter (PIT)	(England) Dennis (PHX) (United States) Rebollar (MB) (Egypt) Aboukoura (LDN) (Australia) Armenakas (OAK)	(United States) Myers (CHS) (United States) Zubak (OC) (Liberia) Wilson (OAK)	(United States) Shakes (NMU) (United States) Schaefer (IND) (United States) Tubbs (LDN) (United States) Davila (LOU) (El Salvador) Calvillo (ELP) (United States) Williams (NMU) (Mexico) Trejo (OAK)	(England) Jordan Stewart (MB)	
31	(United States) Shutler (OC)	(Puerto Rico) Turnbull (BHM) (French Guiana) Vancaeyezeele (ELP) (United States) Jones (LOU)	(Mexico) Colli (SAN) (Jamaica) Lambert (LOU) (Ecuador) Cedeno (DET) (South Africa) Webber (TUL)	(El Salvador) Moreno (ELP) (Haiti) Pacius (TBR) (Argentina) Zárate (MIA)	(Mexico) Herrera (DET) (Grenada) Paterson (BHM) (United States) Maples (NMU) (United States) Davila (LOU) (El Salvador) Calvillo (ELP) (United States) Crisostomo (TBR) (Germany) Wanner (SAC)	(Argentina) Gastón Maddoni (MIA)	
32	(United States) Mora-Mora (ELP)	(United States) Batista (TUL) (Cuba) Diz Pe (HFD) (United States) Suber (PIT)	(United States) Hernandez (OC) (United States) Panayotou (HFD) (Scotland) Kelly (OC) (United States) Anderson (HFD)	(United States) Trager (OC) (United States) Williams (RI) (Scotland) Hurst (NMU)	(United States) Deric (TUL) (Canada) Belluz (HFD) (United States) Sanchez (RI) (United States) Griffin (PIT) (England) Dennis (PHX) (Greece) Fuson (RI) (United States) Rodriguez (LVL)	(United States) Brendan Burke (HFD)	
33	(United States) Shutler (OC)	(United States) Suber (PIT) (United States) Margvelashvili (OAK) (United States) Ricketts (MIA)	(United States) Mendez (TBR) (Republic of Ireland) Molloy (CHS) (Scotland) Epps (LEX) (United States) Wälti (PIT)	(Democratic Republic of the Congo) Ngalina (HFD) (Liberia) Wilson (OAK) (Cuba) Rendón (IND)	(Spain) Vegas (RI) (France) Vacter (PIT) (Haiti) Lacroix (COS) (United States) Ferri (LEX) (United States) Wilson (LOU) (Argentina) Mercado (MIA) (United States) Akale (NMU)	(United States) Ben Pirmann (CHS)	
34	(Germany) Rakovsky (PHX)	(United States) Knutson (MIA) (United States) Taintor (SAN) (Trinidad and Tobago) Hackshaw (OAK)	(United States) Dalou (TUL) (Republic of Ireland) Molloy (CHS) (El Salvador) Calvillo (ELP) (Mexico) Hernández (SAN)	(United States) Prentice (OAK) (United States) Calheira (TUL) (Liberia) Wilson (OAK)	(Germany) Semmle (NC) (Republic of Ireland) Desmond (SAC) (France) Vacter (PIT) (United States) Davila (LOU) (England) Bettache (OAK) (United States) ElMedkhar (TUL (Saint Vincent and the Grenadines) Anderson (NC)	(United States) Benny Feilhaber (OAK)	
