= Wilmer Cabrera =

Wilmer Cabrera may refer to:

- Wílmer Cabrera (born 1967), Colombian footballer and manager
- Wilmer Cabrera Jr. (born 2000), Colombian footballer
- Wilmar Cabrera (born 1959), Uruguayan footballer
