= David Cabrera (Colombian footballer) =

Colombian footballer (born 1995)

Personal information
- Full name: David Felipe Cabrera
- Date of birth: January 10, 1995 (age 31)
- Place of birth: Cali, Colombia
- Height: 1.75 m (5 ft 9 in)
- Position: Midfielder

College career
Years	Team	Apps	(Gls)
2013–2016	South Dakota Mines Hardrockers	65	(2)

Senior career*
Years	Team	Apps	(Gls)
2018–2019	Rio Grande Valley FC	8	(0)
- * Club domestic league appearances and goals as of 26 October 2019

David Felipe Cabrera (born January 10, 1995) is a Colombian footballer.

== Career ==
=== College ===
Cabrera played four years of college soccer at South Dakota School of Mines and Technology between 2013 and 2016.

=== Professional ===
Cabrera signed for United Soccer League side Rio Grande Valley FC Toros during their 2018 season. He made his professional debut on August 26, 2018, start in a 2–0 victory over Orange County SC.

== Personal ==
David is the son of Wilmer Cabrera, currently the head coach of Major League Soccer side Houston Dynamo. His brother, Wilmer Jr., is also a footballer.
