= Frank Daroma =

Sierra Leonean footballer (born 2001)

Personal information
- Full name: Frank Daroma
- Date of birth: 12 April 2001 (age 25)
- Place of birth: Freetown, Sierra Leone
- Height: 1.62 m (5 ft 4 in)
- Position: Midfielder

Team information
- Current team: Colorado Springs Switchbacks
- Number: 8

Youth career
- 2018–2019: Barca Residency Academy

College career
Years	Team	Apps	(Gls)
2019–2020	Cal State San Bernardino Coyotes	19	(4)

Senior career*
Years	Team	Apps	(Gls)
2021–2022	Las Vegas Lights	64	(0)
2023–2024	Tacoma Defiance	37	(1)
2025	El Paso Locomotive	26	(1)
2026–	Colorado Springs Switchbacks	25	(0)
- * Club domestic league appearances and goals as of 19:47, 8 November 2026 (UTC)

Frank Daroma (born 12 April 2001) is a Sierra Leonean footballer who currently plays for USL Championship side Colorado Springs Switchbacks.

== Career ==
=== Youth ===
Daroma played with the USSDA Barca Residency academy for a year prior to attending college.

=== College ===
In early 2019, Daroma signed a letter of intent to play college soccer at the University of California, Santa Barbara. However, Daroma went on to attend California State University, San Bernardino later that year, where he went on to make 19 appearances, scoring 4 goals and tallying 5 assists for the 'Yotes. In his freshman season, Daroma was named CCAA Freshman of the Year and was honored as a First Team All-American and All Region selection. There was no 2020 season in the CCAA due to the COVID-19 pandemic.

=== Professional ===
On 5 April 2021, Daroma was announced as a signing for USL Championship side Las Vegas Lights, opting to pursue a professional career and leaving college early. Daroma made his professional debut on 5 May 2021, starting in a 5–0 loss to LA Galaxy II.

Daroma signed with USL Championship club El Paso Locomotive on 7 January 2025.

On 17 December 2025, Daroma signed with Colorado Springs Switchbacks ahead of their 2026 season in the USL Championship.
