= Wilmer Cabrera Jr. =

Colombian footballer (born 2000)

Personal information
- Date of birth: July 29, 2000 (age 26)
- Place of birth: Bogotá, Colombia
- Height: 1.73 m (5 ft 8 in)
- Position: Forward

Team information
- Current team: Charleston Battery
- Number: 13

Youth career
- 2011–2016: Colorado Rapids
- 2016–2018: IMG Academy
- 2018–2019: Houston Dynamo

College career
Years	Team	Apps	(Gls)
2019–2022	Butler Bulldogs	70	(23)

Senior career*
Years	Team	Apps	(Gls)
2018	Brazos Valley Cavalry	0	(0)
2018–2019	Rio Grande Valley FC	30	(4)
2023	Real Cartagena	0	(0)
2023	→ Rio Grande Valley FC (loan)	25	(7)
2023–2024	Greifswalder FC	16	(3)
2024–2025	El Paso Locomotive	26	(10)
2026–	Charleston Battery	26	(4)
- * Club domestic league appearances and goals as of November 4, 2026

Wilmer "Andres" Cabrera Jr. (born July 29, 2000) is a Colombian footballer who currently plays for Charleston Battery in the USL Championship.

== Career ==
Cabrera spent time with the academy team at Colorado Rapids, before moving to the IMG Academy in Florida in 2016.

In May 2018, it was announced that Cabrera would spend time with Houston Dynamo's USL PDL affiliate side Brazos Valley Cavalry ahead of their 2018 season.

On June 3, 2018, Cabrera appeared for Houston Dynamo's United Soccer League side Rio Grande Valley FC as an 83rd-minute substitute during a 2–0 loss to Real Monarchs.

In October 2019, Cabrera Jr. left Rio Grande Valley to play college soccer at Butler University.

On December 22, 2022, Cabrera Jr. was drafted in the third round with the 76th overall pick of the 2023 MLS SuperDraft by Chicago Fire.

On March 3, 2023, it was announced that Cabrera had signed with Colombian Categoría Primera B side Real Cartagena, but was immediately loaned to his former club Rio Grande Valley FC.

On August 2, 2024, Cabrera signed a 25-day contract with El Paso Locomotive in the USL Championship, where his father Wilmer Cabrera is the manager.

On December 9, 2025, it was confirmed that Cabrera Jr. would leave El Paso and join Charleston Battery ahead of their 2026 season in the USL Championship.

== Personal ==
Wilmer is the son of Wilmer Cabrera, currently the head coach of USL Championship side El Paso Locomotive. His brother, David, was also a footballer.
