= El Paso Locomotive FC =

American professional soccer club based in El Paso

El Paso Locomotive
- Full name: El Paso Locomotive Football Club
- Nickname: The Locos
- Founded: March 1, 2018; 8 years ago
- Stadium: Southwest University Park
- Capacity: 7,500
- Owner: MountainStar Sports Group
- Head coach: Junior Gonzalez
- League: USL Championship
- 2025: 4th, Western Conference; Playoffs:Conference Quarter-Finals
- Website: eplocomotivefc.com
Home colors	Away colors

El Paso Locomotive FC, also known as El Paso Loco or simply El Paso FC, is an American professional soccer team based in El Paso, Texas. Founded in 2018, the team made its debut in the USL Championship in 2019.

== History ==
=== First season ===
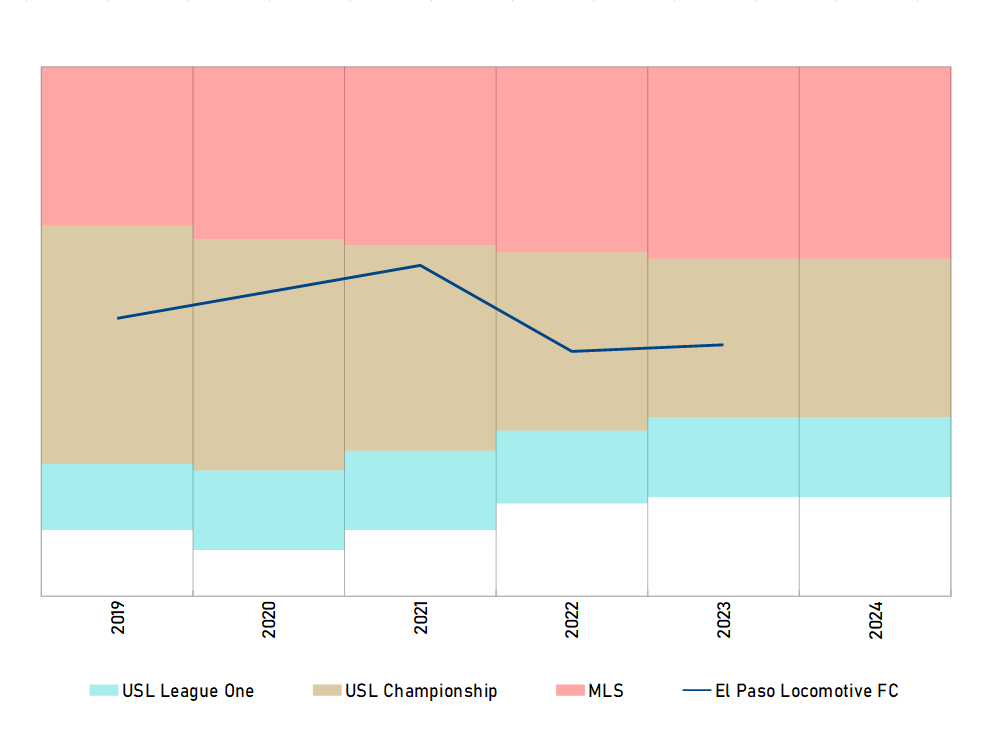
Historical chart of El Paso Locomotive's regular season performance within the American soccer pyramid

In February 2018, the United Soccer League announced that El Paso was selected as an expansion team for the 2019 USL Championship season. The club will be run by MountainStar Sports Group. In June 2018, El Paso announced the signing of their first player, Omar Salgado. In July 2018, El Paso announced that their first head coach would be Mark Lowry, who had previously coached NASL's Jacksonville Armada FC. After a 34-game season, El Paso Locomotive FC qualified for the USL Championship play-offs, reaching the Western Conference finals before falling 2–1 to the Real Monarchs.

=== 2020 ===
With COVID-19 shutting down many organizations worldwide, USL followed suit on March 12, 2020, announcing the season would be temporarily suspended. In June 2020, USL Championship announced their return to play would be in an altered format of four team groups, competing for a spot in the playoffs starting in July 2020. After the shortened season, El Paso Locomotive FC qualified for the playoffs advancing to the Western Conference Finals for a second year in a row, before falling to Phoenix Rising FC 4–2 in a shootout.

=== 2021–2024 ===
The 2021 USL Championship season returned to normal scheduling, consisting of a 32 game season, after which El Paso Locomotive FC qualified for their third straight playoffs, but failing to get past the first round, falling to the Oakland Roots 1–0. Though they fell out of the playoffs in the first round, El Paso had a great season, with Coach Lowry and six players being chosen for the USL Copa XI. El Paso earned the title of best Division II team in Texas by winning the Copa Tejas Trophy. In addition, El Paso was recognized as the most successful club in Texas, winning the inaugural Copa Tejas Shield. Coach Lowry announced on November 15, 2021 that he would be leaving El Paso Locomotive FC.

In December 2021, El Paso Locomotive FC announced they had hired John Hutchinson as their head coach going into the 2022 USL Championship season. 2022 was again a 34 game season for the USL Championship, but for the first time in club history, El Paso failed to make the playoffs, finishing eight in the Western Conference. After the 2022 season, Coach Hutchinson stepped down as coach to return with his family back to Australia.

In January 2023, El Paso Locomotive announced they had hired Brian Clarhaut as their head coach going into the 2023 USL Championship season. After a 34 game season, El Paso finished in 7th place in the Western Conference, qualifying for the playoffs before losing to Orange County SC 1–0 in the Western Conference quarterfinals.

In the 2024 season, El Paso started with a 1–8–2 record in their first eleven games. On May 17, the team announced they had parted ways with head coach Brian Clarhaut and assistant coach Jon Burklo.

== Club crest and colors ==
The Locomotive brand was unveiled on October 4, 2018, beating out finalists Lagartos, Estrellas, Stars, and Tejanos. The crest is shaped in a manner similar to Mission Style buildings and features three main colors: West Texas Sky blue, Desert Dusk blue, and High Noon Sun. The crest has 11 vertical stripes that represent the eleven players on the field and resemble the front of a locomotive. A city icon, The Star on The Mountain, adorns the top of the crest, which is shaped in the silhouette of the Franklin Mountains.

=== Kit history ===
Home, away, and third kits.

- Home

2019	2020	2021	2022	2023	2024	2025	2026

- Away

2019	2020	2021	2022	2023	2024	2025	2026

- Third

2019	2020	2021	2022	2023	2024

=== Sponsorship ===
Period	Kit manufacturer	Shirt sponsor
2019–2020	BLK	Southwest University
2021–2023	Adidas	Southwest University
2024–present	Hummel	Southwest University

== Stadium ==
The club play at Southwest University Park, a baseball stadium in Downtown El Paso that is also the home field for the El Paso Chihuahuas of the Pacific Coast League.

== Rivalries ==
El Paso's primary rivals are New Mexico United and FC Juárez.

== Players and staff ==
=== Roster ===
As of September 28, 2026

Note: Flags indicate national team as defined under FIFA eligibility rules; some limited exceptions apply. Players may hold more than one non-FIFA nationality.

No.	Pos.	Nation	Player
1	GK	USA	Sebastián Mora-Mora
2	DF	PUR	Nicolás Cardona
5	MF	USA	Daniel Gómez
6	MF	ESA	Eric Calvillo
8	MF	HAI	Carl Sainté
9	FW	MEX	Diego Abitia
10	FW	ESA	Amando Moreno
11	FW	LBR	Jimmy Farkarlun
12	DF	USA	Ricky Ruiz
13	FW	USA	Beto Avila
14	FW	GUA	Rubio Rubín
15	DF	DOM	Noah Dollenmayer
16	DF	BRA	Gabi Torres

No.	Pos.	Nation	Player
18	DF	USA	Alvaro Quezada
19	MF	USA	Alex Mendez
21	MF	GHA	Kofi Twumasi
23	DF	USA	Memo Diaz
25	DF	MEX	Arturo Ortiz
28	FW	USA	Omar Mora
29	DF	USA	Kenneth Hoban
30	MF	USA	Robert Coronado
33	GK	USA	Trace Alphin
77	DF	USA	Joseluis Villagomez
91	FW	MEX	Cristo Fernández
93	DF	MEX	Tony Alfaro
99	GK	MEX	Abraham Romero

=== Front-office staff ===
- Alan Ledford – president
- Mike Digiulio – general manager
- Brad Taylor - senior vice president

=== Technical staff ===
- Junior Gonzalez – head coach
- Ray Saari – technical director
- Vacant – 1st assistant coach
- Gianluca Masucci – assistant coach
- JC Garzon – goalkeeper coach
- Saul Soto – coordinator, equipment and player operations

=== Club captains ===
Years	Name	Nation
2019–2020	Chiró N'Toko	Belgium
2021–2024	Yuma	Spain
2025–present	Eric Calvillo	El Salvador

== Team records ==
=== Year-by-year ===
As of October 18, 2025

Season	USL Championship								Play-offs	U.S. Open Cup	USL Jägermeister Cup	Top scorer ^{1}		Head coach
Season	P	W	L	D	GF	GA	Pts	Pos	Play-offs	U.S. Open Cup	USL Jägermeister Cup	Player	Goals	Head coach
2019	34	13	10	11	42	36	50	6th, Western	Conference Final	Second round	—	(United States) Jerome Kiesewetter	12	(England) Mark Lowry
2020	16	9	2	5	24	14	32	4th, Western; 1st, Group C	Conference Final	Cancelled	—	(Mexico) Aarón Gómez	5	(England) Mark Lowry
2021	32	18	4	10	56	34	64	2nd, Western; 1st, Mountain Division	Conference Quarterfinals	Cancelled	—	(Mexico) Aarón Gómez (Argentina) Luis Solignac	10	(England) Mark Lowry
2022	34	13	14	7	56	52	46	8th, Western	Did not qualify	Second round	—	(Argentina) Luis Solignac	16	(Malta) John Hutchinson
2023	34	13	13	8	41	51	47	7th, Western	Conference Quarterfinals	Second round	—	(Argentina) Luis Solignac	9	(United States) Brian Clarhaut
2024	34	8	18	8	27	46	32	12th, Western	Did not qualify	Third round	—	(El Salvador) Amando Moreno	6	(United States) Brian Clarhaut (Colombia) Wilmer Cabrera
2025	29	10	8	11	45	40	41	4th, Western	R1	R32	Group Stage	(Colombia) Andy Cabrera	10	(Colombia) Wilmer Cabrera
Total	213	84	69	60	302	273	312	–	–	–	–	Luis Solignac	35	–

Notes

1. Top scorer includes statistics from league matches only.

=== Head coaches ===
Coach	Nationality	Start	End	Games	Win	Loss	Draw	Win %
Mark Lowry	England	July 25, 2018	November 15, 2021	57	26	15	16	45.61
John Hutchinson	Australia	December 9, 2021	November 15, 2022	35	13	15	7	37.14
Brian Clarhaut	United States	December 15, 2022	May 17, 2024	48	14	11	23	29.17
Wilmer Cabrera	Colombia	May 20, 2024	November 3, 2025	59	21	19	19	35.59
Junior Gonzalez	United States	December 29, 2025	present	0	0	0	0	0.0

Notes

*Includes USL Regular Season, USL Playoffs, U.S. Open Cup. Excludes friendlies.

=== Average attendance ===
Year	Reg. season	Playoffs
2019	6,584	7,460
2020 (Note: COVID-19)	1,458	1,659
2021	6,214	7,201
2022	6,517	DNQ
2023	6,590	N/A
2024	5,814	N/A
2025	5,514	3,469

== Honors ==
=== Minor ===
- Copa Tejas (Division 2)
  - Winners (1): 2021, 2024
- Copa Tejas (Shield)
  - Winners (1): 2021

=== Player honors ===
Year	Player	Country	Position	Honor
2021	Diego Luna	United States	Midfielder	All-League Second Team
