= Eric Calvillo =

Footballer (born 1998)

Personal information
- Full name: Eric Santana Calvillo Ramirez
- Date of birth: 2 January 1998 (age 28)
- Place of birth: Palmdale, California, United States
- Height: 5 ft 7 in (1.70 m)
- Position: Midfielder

Team information
- Current team: El Paso Locomotive
- Number: 6

Youth career
- Real So Cal

Senior career*
Years	Team	Apps	(Gls)
2016–2017	New York Cosmos	19	(4)
2018–2021	San Jose Earthquakes	11	(0)
2018–2019	→ Reno 1868 (loan)	20	(1)
2021	→ Orange County SC (loan)	25	(2)
2022–	El Paso Locomotive	148	(17)

International career^{‡}
2013–2015	United States U17	36	(0)
2016	United States U19	4	(0)
2021	El Salvador U23	3	(0)
2021–	El Salvador	8	(0)
- * Club domestic league appearances and goals as of 21:02, 8 November 2026 (UTC) ‡ National team caps and goals as of 8 June 2022

Eric Santana Calvillo Ramirez (born 2 January 1998) is a professional footballer who plays as a midfielder for USL Championship club El Paso Locomotive. Born in the United States, he plays for the El Salvador national team.

== Club career ==
=== New York Cosmos ===
Calvillo signed with the New York Cosmos on January 15, 2016. He made 21 appearances and scored 4 goals for the NASL side, and was with the team, when it won the Soccer Bowl 2016 and was the runner-up for the Soccer Bowl 2017. He was the runner-up for the 2017 NASL Young Player of the Year.

=== San Jose Earthquakes ===
On January 20, 2018, the San Jose Earthquakes of MLS signed Calvillo to a multiyear contract. He was then sent to San Jose's USL affiliate, Reno 1868, on a temporary loan basis, and made his first appearance as a starter in Reno's 3–4 loss to Swope Park Rangers on March 17, 2018. Following the 2021 season, San Jose declined their contract option on Calvillo.

=== El Paso Locomotive ===
On January 11, 2022, Calvillo signed with USL Championship side, El Paso Locomotive. In the 2022 season, he made 31 appearances and scored 6 goals, including a direct free kick against Atlanta United II.

== International career ==
Calvillo has appeared for the United States at the U-15, U-17, and U-19 levels. At the 2015 FIFA U-17 World Cup, he appeared on the 21-man roster, alongside Christian Pulisic, and captained the US squad at the 2016 U-19 Copa del Atlantico. He later chose to represent El Salvador and has since made eight appearances at the senior level.

== Personal life ==
Calvillo was born in the United States to a Mexican father and Salvadoran mother.

== Statistics ==
As of 25 October 2025

Club	Season	League			League Cup		National Cup (Note: Includes appearances in U.S. Open Cup)		Totals	
Club	Season	League	Apps	Goals	Apps	Goals	Apps	Goals	Apps	Goals
New York Cosmos	2016	NASL	3	1	–		0	0	3	1
New York Cosmos	2017	NASL	18	3	–		1	0	19	3
Total			21	4	–		1	0	22	4
San Jose Earthquakes	2018	MLS	3	0	–		0	0	3	0
San Jose Earthquakes	2019	MLS	2	0	–		0	0	2	0
San Jose Earthquakes	2020	MLS	7	0	–		0	0	7	0
Total			12	0	-		0	0	12	0
Reno 1868 (loan)	2018	USL	11	1	–		0	0	11	1
Reno 1868 (loan)	2019	USLC	9	0	–		2	0	11	0
Reno 1868 (loan)	2020	USLC	1	0	–		0	0	1	0
Orange County SC (loan)	2021	USLC	29	2	–		0	0	29	2
Total			50	3	-		2	0	52	3
El Paso Locomotive FC	2022	USLC	31	6	–		1	1	32	7
El Paso Locomotive FC	2023	USLC	31	3	1	0	0	0	32	3
El Paso Locomotive FC	2024	USLC	33	3	–		1	0	34	3
El Paso Locomotive FC	2025	USLC	25	2	0	0	4	0	29	3
Total			120	14	1	0	6	1	127	15
Career Total			202	21	1	0	9	1	225	22

== Honours ==
Orange County SC

- USL Championship: 2021
