= Brian Clarhaut =

American soccer coach

Personal information
- Full name: Brian Clarhaut
- Date of birth: April 11, 1986 (age 40)
- Place of birth: Medford, New Jersey, United States
- Position: Midfielder

Youth career
- 2000–2002: Bishop Eustace Crusaders
- 2003: Shawnee Renegades

College career
Years	Team	Apps	(Gls)
2004–2006	Saint Peter's Peacocks		

Managerial career
- 2011–2012: Connecticut Huskies (assistant)
- 2012–2015: Temple Owls (assistant)
- 2016–2017: Nyköpings BIS (assistant)
- 2017–2019: Nyköpings BIS
- 2020–2021: Umeå FC
- 2021–2022: GIF Sundsvall (assistant)
- 2022: GIF Sundsvall
- 2023–2024: El Paso Locomotive

Brian Clarhaut (born April 11, 1986) is an American soccer coach.

== Career ==
=== Playing career ===
Clarhaut played high school soccer for Bishop Eustace Preparatory School from his freshman to junior year, and played for Shawnee High School his senior year, leading the team to the Group IV state championship. In 2002, he set a state season assists record with 27.

Clarhaut played college soccer at Saint Peter's University from 2004 until 2006. He was a member of the All-Metro Atlantic Athletic Conference (MAAC) Academic team.

=== Coaching career ===
On August 13, 2012, Clarhaut was named as an assistant coach to Temple University's men's soccer team. Afterwards, he moved to Sweden where he coached Nyköpings BIS from 2017 to 2019 after being assistant coach for the club from 2016 to 2017.

Clarhaut was named new head coach of Umeå FC on November 28, 2019, signing a two-year contract with an option for an additional year.

In 2021, he became assistant coach to Henrik Åhnstrand at Allsvenskan club GIF Sundsvall. After Åhnstrand was sacked in July 2022, Clarhaut took over as head coach. GIF Sundsvall announced on November 11, Clarhaut will leave his position when the contract ends on December 31.

On December 15, 2022, it was announced that Clarhaut would take over as head coach at El Paso Locomotive FC in the USL Championship ahead of the 2023 season. Clarhaut and El Paso parted ways on May 17, 2024.
