= Arturo Ortiz (footballer) =

Mexican footballer (born 1992)

Personal information
- Full name: Arturo Ortiz Martínez
- Date of birth: 25 August 1992 (age 34)
- Place of birth: Monterrey, Nuevo León, Mexico
- Height: 1.85 m (6 ft 1 in)
- Position: Centre-back

Team information
- Current team: El Paso Locomotive
- Number: 25

Youth career
- 2007–2008: Unión de Curtidores
- 2008–2010: Celaya
- 2010–2011: Monterrey

Senior career*
| Years | Team | Apps | (Gls) |
| 2011–2012 | Tepic | 24 | (3) |
| 2012–2014 | León | 6 | (0) |
| 2015–2017 | Zacatecas | 70 | (7) |
| 2017 | → UdeG (loan) | 18 | (0) |
| 2018–2019 | UAT | 42 | (3) |
| 2019–2021 | UdeG | 46 | (3) |
| 2021–2023 | UNAM | 67 | (4) |
| 2021 | → Pumas Tabasco (loan) | 2 | (0) |
| 2024– | Juárez | 7 | (1) |
| 2024– | → El Paso Locomotive (loan) | 47 | (2) |

International career^{‡}
| 2022 | Mexico | 1 | (0) |
- * Club domestic league appearances and goals as of 21:07, 8 November 2026 (UTC) ‡ National team caps and goals as of 27 April 2022

Arturo Ortiz Martínez (born 25 August 1992), also known as Palermo, is a Mexican professional footballer who plays as a centre-back for USL Championship club El Paso Locomotive on loan from Juárez.

== International career ==
On 27 April 2022, Ortiz made his senior national team under Gerardo Martino in a friendly match against Guatemala.

== Career statistics ==
=== International ===
As of match played 27 April 2022

| National team | Year | Apps | Goals |
|---|---|---|---|
| Mexico | 2022 | 1 | 0 |
| Total | | 1 | 0 |

== Honours ==
Individual

- CONCACAF Champions League Best XI: 2022
