= Noah Dollenmayer =

Dominican footballer (born 1999)

Personal information
- Full name: Noah Patrick Dollenmayer García
- Birth name: Noah Patrick Dollenmayer
- Date of birth: 26 October 1999 (age 27)
- Place of birth: Thousand Oaks, California, U.S.
- Height: 1.98 m (6 ft 6 in)
- Position: Defender

Team information
- Current team: El Paso Locomotive
- Number: 15

College career
| Years | Team | Apps | (Gls) |
| 2018–2019 | Oxnard College | 45 | (5) |
| 2021 | Cal State Fullerton | 16 | (1) |
| 2022 | Cal State San Bernardino | 3 | (0) |

Senior career*
| Years | Team | Apps | (Gls) |
| 2023 | Los Angeles FC | 0 | (0) |
| 2023 | Los Angeles FC 2 | 16 | (0) |
| 2023– | El Paso Locomotive | 63 | (2) |
| 2025 | → San Antonio FC (loans) | 4 | (0) |

International career^{‡}
| 2025– | Dominican Republic | 16 | (2) |
- * Club domestic league appearances and goals as of 21:05, 8 November 2026 (UTC) ‡ National team caps and goals as of 5 October 2026

Noah Patrick Dollenmayer García (born 26 October 1999) is a professional footballer who plays as a defender for USL Championship club El Paso Locomotive FC and the Dominican Republic national team.

== International goals ==
=== International goals ===
Scores and results list Dominican Republic’s goal tally first.

| No | Date | Venue | Opponent | Score | Result | Competition |
|---|---|---|---|---|---|---|
| 1. | 21 March 2025 | Juan Ramón Loubriel Stadium, Bayamón, Puerto Rico | Puerto Rico | 1–1 | 2–2 | Friendly |
| 2. | 10 June 2025 | Estadio Olímpico Félix Sánchez, Santo Domingo, Dominican Republic | Dominica | 3–0 | 5–0 | 2026 FIFA World Cup qualification |
