= Gabriel Torres (Brazilian footballer) =

Brazilian footballer (born 1996)

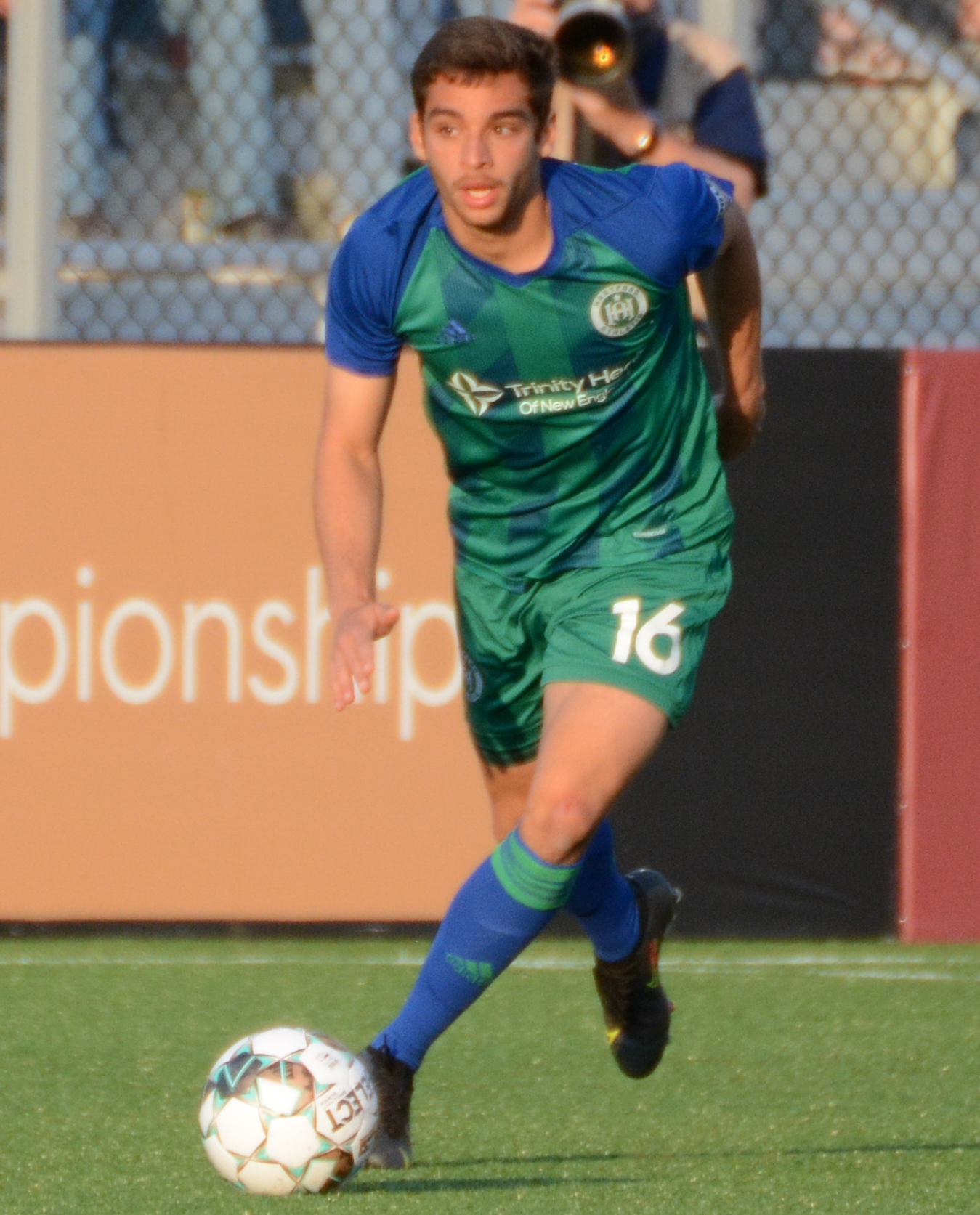
- Torres with Hartford Athletic in 2021

Personal information
- Date of birth: August 1, 1996 (age 30)
- Place of birth: Salvador, Bahia, Brazil
- Height: 1.78 m (5 ft 10 in)
- Positions: Defender; defensive midfielder

Team information
- Current team: El Paso Locomotive
- Number: 16

College career
Years	Team	Apps	(Gls)
2016–2018	UDC Firebirds	55	(34)

Senior career*
Years	Team	Apps	(Gls)
2018	The Villages SC	14	(0)
2019	Chattanooga FC	9	(0)
2020–2021	Hartford Athletic	29	(2)
2022	FC Tulsa	23	(1)
2022–2024	Phoenix Rising	49	(4)
2025–	El Paso Locomotive	52	(5)
- * Club domestic league appearances and goals as of 21:05, 8 November 2026 (UTC)

Gabriel Torres (born 6 January 1996) is a Brazilian footballer who currently plays for El Paso Locomotive FC in the USL Championship.

== Career ==
=== UDC ===
Torres played three years of college soccer at the University of the District of Columbia from 2016 to 2018. While playing with the Firebirds, Torres made 55 appearances, scoring 34 goals and tallying 21 assists.

=== The Villages SC ===
During his 2018 season, Torres appeared for USL PDL side The Villages SC.

=== Chattanooga FC ===
Following college, Torres joined NPSL side Chattanooga FC for their 2019 season.

=== Hartford Athletic ===
On 9 December 2019, Torres joined USL Championship side Hartford Athletic ahead of their 2020 season. He made his debut on 20 July 2020, starting against Loudoun United. He scored his first professional goal on July 25, 2020, against Philadelphia Union II and was named to USL Championship Team of the Week. He finished the season with two goals and six assists in Hartford's fifteen regular season and postseason games. He was re-signed with the club for the 2021 season in December 2020.

=== FC Tulsa ===
On 18 January 2022, Torres signed with USL Championship side FC Tulsa.

=== Phoenix Rising FC ===
On 23 September 2022, Torres signed with Phoenix Rising FC. Torres helped Phoenix to win their first-ever USL Championship title in 2023.

=== El Paso Locomotive FC ===
On 8 January 2025, Phoenix dealt Torres to El Paso Locomotive FC.
