= Sebastián Mora-Mora =

American soccer player (born 1998)

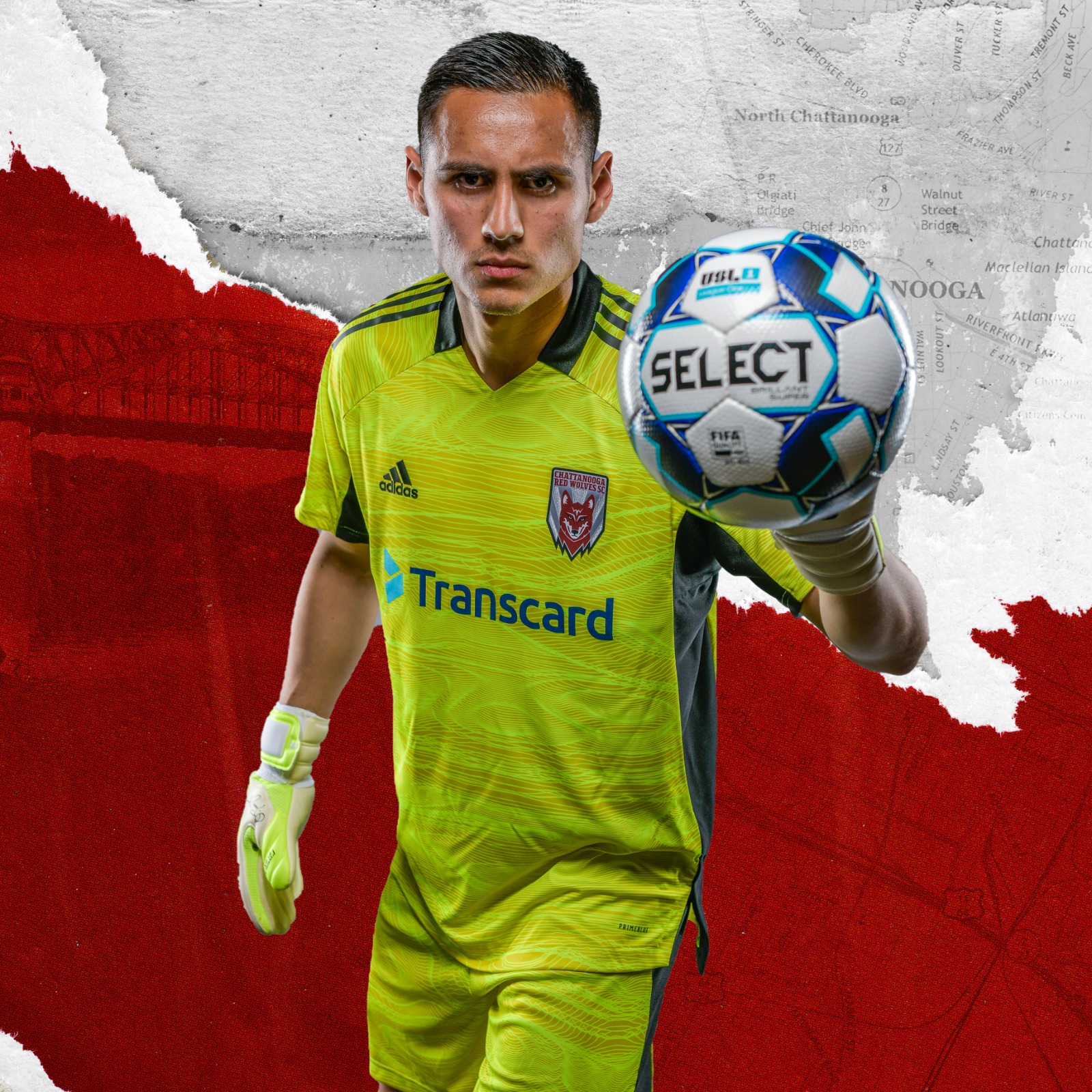
- Mora-Mora in 2021

Personal information
- Date of birth: April 14, 1998 (age 28)
- Place of birth: San Diego, California, U.S.
- Height: 1.85 m (6 ft 1 in)
- Position: Goalkeeper

Team information
- Current team: El Paso Locomotive

Youth career
- 2013: UNAM
- 2015–2016: Nomads SC
- 2016–2017: Real Salt Lake AZ
- 2017–2019: Tijuana
- 2019–2020: Talleres (RE)

Senior career*
Years	Team	Apps	(Gls)
2017–2018	Tijuana Premier	18	(0)
2020	Reno 1868	0	(0)
2021	Chattanooga Red Wolves	9	(0)
2022	Tritones Vallarta	23	(0)
2023	Tepatitlán	15	(0)
2024	Celaya	5	(0)
2025–	El Paso Locomotive	19	(0)
- * Club domestic league appearances and goals as of 21:01, 8 November 2026 (UTC)

Sebastián Mora-Mora (born April 14, 1998) is an American professional soccer player who plays as a goalkeeper for USL Championship club El Paso Locomotive FC.

== Career ==
=== Youth ===
In 2013, Mora-Mora was part of the academy at Mexican side UNAM, before going on to spend time with USSDA academy sides Nomads SC and Real Salt Lake AZ, eventually moving to Mexican side Tijuana. Here he played made 18 appearances for Tijuana Premier in the Liga Premier de México. Mora-Mora also spent a year in Argentina with Talleres de Remedios de Escalada.

=== Professional ===
On March 26, 2020, Mora-Mora returned to the United States, signing with USL Championship side Reno 1868. The club ceased operations following their 2020 season.

Mora-Mora joined USL League One side Chattanooga Red Wolves on January 13, 2021, ahead of their 2021 season. He made his debut for the club on May 8, 2021, keeping a clean-sheet during a 1–0 win over North Texas SC.

Mora signed with USL Championship club El Paso Locomotive on January 13, 2025.
