= Wílmer Cabrera =

Colombian footballer and coach (born 1967)

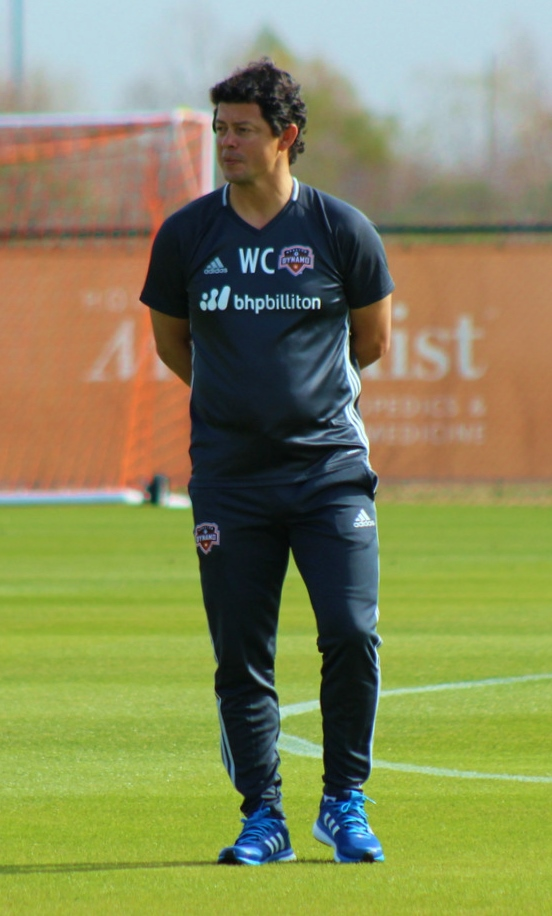
- Cabrera in 2016

Personal information
- Full name: Wílmer Cabrera Linares
- Date of birth: September 15, 1967 (age 59)
- Place of birth: Cartagena, Colombia
- Height: 1.79 m (5 ft 10 in)
- Position: Right-back

Senior career*
Years	Team	Apps	(Gls)
1985–1989	Santa Fe	61	(22)
1990–1997	América de Cali	307	(33)
1997–1998	Independiente	12	(2)
1998	Millonarios	15	(5)
1999	Santa Fe	25	(17)
1999–2000	Tolima	10	(3)
2001	Chicó	?	(?)
2001–2004	Herediano	15	(6)
2004–2005	Long Island Rough Riders	25	(4)
Total		470	(92)

International career
1989–1998	Colombia	48	(3)

Managerial career
- 2005–2006: Suffolk Sharks (assistant)
- 2006–2007: B.W. Gottschee
- 2007: United States U18
- 2007–2012: United States U17
- 2012–2014: Colorado Rapids (assistant)
- 2014: Chivas USA
- 2015–2016: Rio Grande Valley Toros
- 2016–2019: Houston Dynamo
- 2019: Montreal Impact
- 2021–2023: Rio Grande Valley Toros
- 2024–2025: El Paso Locomotive
- * Club domestic league appearances and goals

Wílmer Cabrera Linares (born September 15, 1967) is a Colombian former football defender who was most recently the head coach of El Paso Locomotive in the USL Championship. He previously coached for Chivas USA and Houston Dynamo, as well as the United States men's national under-17 soccer team. During his playing career, Cabrera played as a right back for clubs in the Colombian league and the Colombia national team, representing the country at the 1998 FIFA World Cup.

== Club career ==
Cabrera, born in Cartagena, Colombia, and raised in Bogotá, made his professional debut at the age of 17 for Santa Fe. His 18-year playing career included stints at América de Cali (reaching the 1996 Copa Libertadores Final), Millonarios, Chicó, Independiente of Argentina, Herediano of Costa Rica and the Long Island Rough Riders of the United States.

== International career ==
Cabrera was capped 48 times and scored 3 international goals for Colombia between 1989 and 1998. He was an unused substitute during the 1990 FIFA World Cup but played in all of the country's three matches in the 1998 FIFA World Cup. He also played in four Copa América competitions in 1989, 1991, 1995 and 1997.

== Coaching career ==
After retiring, Cabrera settled permanently in the United States to pursue work as a helicopter pilot in the New York City area. He began working with the Major League Soccer front office as a community development manager working on Hispanic grassroots and youth programs. He also worked as an assistant coach for the Suffolk County Community College men's soccer team as well as top-ranked youth soccer club B.W. Gottschee, based in Queens, New York.

Cabrera earned his United States Soccer Federation A Coaching License in 2005 and became an assistant coach with the United States men's national under-18 soccer team in 2007. He was named by the USSF as head coach of the United States men's national under-17 soccer team on October 25, 2007, becoming the first Latin American head coach in the U.S. national team system. On January 24, 2012, he was replaced in this role by Richie Williams.

In January 2012, Cabrera was named assistant coach for the Colorado Rapids of Major League Soccer.

In January 2014, Chivas USA appointed Cabrera as head coach. The club was dissolved by the league at the end of the season, with Cabrera's team finishing seventh in the Western Conference, the highest finish for Chivas USA in their final five seasons.

Cabrera was named head coach of the Rio Grande Valley FC Toros of the United Soccer League on December 2, 2015.

Cabrera was named head coach of the Houston Dynamo on October 28, 2016. He and the Dynamo parted ways on August 13, 2019.

Cabrera became head coach of the Montreal Impact on August 21, 2019. On October 24, 2019, the Impact announced that his contract would not be renewed for the 2020 season.

Cabrera was named head coach of El Paso Locomotive on May 20, 2024. The announcement came just days after El Paso announced that they had parted ways with then-manager Brian Clarhaut. On November 3 2025, El Paso announced that his contract would not be renewed for the 2026 season.

== Managerial statistics ==
As of match played 5 April 2024

Managerial record by team and tenure
Team	Nat	From	To	Record							
Team	Nat	From	To	G	W	D	L	GF	GA	GD	Win %
Chivas USA	(United States)	9 January 2014	26 October 2014	35	9	7	19	30	62	−32	25.71
Rio Grande Valley FC Toros	(United States)	2 December 2015	28 October 2016	31	14	9	8	49	27	+22	45.16
Houston Dynamo	(United States)	28 October 2016	13 August 2019	112	42	25	45	181	169	+12	37.50
Montreal Impact	(Canada)	21 August 2019	24 October 2019	9	3	1	5	9	11	−2	33.33
Rio Grande Valley FC Toros	(United States)	20 February 2021	21 November 2023	72	28	18	26	49	42	+7	38.89
El Paso Locomotive	(United States)	24 May 2024	3 November 2025	25	9	6	10	43	56	−13	36.00
Total				294	105	76	113	361	367	−6	35.71

== Honours ==
Player

Independiente Santa Fe

- Copa Colombia: 1989

América de Cali

- Categoría Primera A: 1990, 1992, 1996–97

Coach

Houston Dynamo

- U.S. Open Cup: 2018

Montreal Impact

- Canadian Championship: 2019
