= 2025 Las Vegas Lights FC season =

Las Vegas Lights FC
2025 season
- Principal Owner: José Bautista
- Head coach: Devin Rensing
- Stadium: Cashman Field
- USL Championship: Western Conference: 12th Overall: 24th
- USL Championship Playoffs: DNQ
- U.S. Open Cup: Third Round
| Home colors | Away colors | Third colors |

The 2025 Las Vegas Lights FC season was the club's eighth season, and their eighth season in the United Soccer League Championship (USLC), the second division of American soccer.

During the offseason, the Lights underwent a notable coaching change. Following their first playoff appearance in club history the previous season under head coach Dennis Sanchez, who took the club all the way to the Western Conference Final, Sanchez was hired by New Mexico United. He was replaced by Antonio Nocerino, who previously led fellow USL Championship club Miami FC to a league-worst eleven points all season.

Twelve games into the season, after poor performance that saw the Lights out of a playoff position, Nocerino was let go by the Lights. He was later replaced by Devin Rensing, who previously served as an assistant coach for the Charleston Battery.

== Squad ==
=== Roster ===
As of March 13, 2025

Note: Flags indicate national team as defined under FIFA eligibility rules; some limited exceptions apply. Players may hold more than one non-FIFA nationality.

| No. | Pos. | Nation | Player |
|---|---|---|---|
| 1 | GK | SUI | Nicholas Ammeter |
| 3 | DF | USA | Hayden Sargis (on loan from D.C. United) |
| 6 | MF | ENG | Charlie Adams |
| 7 | MF | USA | Joe Gyau |
| 9 | FW | DOM | Riki Alba |
| 10 | FW | DOM | Edison Azcona |
| 11 | MF | USA | Coleman Gannon |
| 13 | MF | USA | Giovanni Aguilar |
| 14 | FW | GHA | Solomon Asante |
| 20 | DF | USA | Shawn Smart |
| 21 | DF | MNE | Emrah Klimenta |
| 22 | DF | USA | Joe Hafferty |

| No. | Pos. | Nation | Player |
|---|---|---|---|
| 24 | DF | JAM | Maliek Howell |
| 26 | MF | CMR | J.C. Ngando (on loan from Vancouver Whitecaps) |
| 27 | MF | FRA | Valentin Noël |
| 29 | MF | USA | Christian Pinzón |
| 31 | GK | USA | Austin Wormell |
| 33 | DF | USA | Gennaro Nigro |
| 56 | GK | CUB | Raiko Arozarena |
| 72 | DF | CIV | Gaoussou Samaké |
| 77 | MF | ESA | Alexander Romero |
| 79 | MF | HAI | All Gue |
| 90 | FW | JAM | Khori Bennett |

USL Academy contract

=== Staff ===
| Title | Name | Nation |
|---|---|---|
| Owner | José Bautista | Dominican Republic |
| CEO | Shawn McIntosh | United States |
| Sporting director | Gianleonardo Neglia | Italy |
| Head coach | Devin Rensing | United States |
| Assistant coach | Gerson Echeverry | Colombia |
| Assistant coach | Ivan Mirkovic | Serbia |
| Goalkeeping coach | Armando Quezada | United States |

== Competitions ==
=== USL Championship ===
==== Standings ====
| Pos | Team | Pld | W | L | T | GF | GA | GD | Pts | Qualification |
|---|---|---|---|---|---|---|---|---|---|---|
| 8 | Colorado Springs Switchbacks FC | 30 | 10 | 13 | 7 | 35 | 47 | −12 | 37 | Playoffs |
| 9 | Lexington SC | 30 | 9 | 12 | 9 | 31 | 42 | −11 | 36 | |
| 10 | Oakland Roots SC | 30 | 8 | 14 | 8 | 42 | 52 | −10 | 32 | |
| 11 | Monterey Bay FC | 30 | 7 | 15 | 8 | 27 | 45 | −18 | 29 | |
| 12 | Las Vegas Lights FC | 30 | 6 | 15 | 9 | 23 | 50 | −27 | 27 | |

Source: USL Championship Standings
Rules for classification: 1) head-to-head points; 2) head-to-head goal differential; 3) points-per-game within conference; 4) total wins; 5) total goal differential; 6) total goals scored; 7) points earned against top four Conference finishers; 8) disciplinary points; 9) coin toss or drawing of lots

==== Match results ====
On December 19, 2024, the USL Championship released the regular season schedule for all 24 teams.

All times are in Pacific Standard Time.

===== March =====
| March 8 1 | Las Vegas Lights FC | 1–0 | Tampa Bay Rowdies | Las Vegas, Nevada |
| 7:00 PM | Pinzon 74' | Report | | Stadium: Cashman Field; Attendance: 3,258; Referee: Brandon Stevis |

| March 15 2 | Las Vegas Lights FC | 2–3 | New Mexico United | Las Vegas, Nevada |
| 7:30 PM | Rodriguez 72'; Gyau 90' | Report | Gaines 52' Hurst 69'; Seymore 90+5' | Stadium: Cashman Field; Attendance: 1,851; Referee: Elton García |

| March 29 3 | Oakland Roots SC | 0–0 | Las Vegas Lights FC | Oakland, California |
| 7:00 PM | | Report | | Stadium: Oakland Coliseum; Attendance: 7,077; Referee: Elvis Osmanovic |

===== April =====
| April 5 4 | Las Vegas Lights FC | 1–0 | Orange County SC | Las Vegas, Nevada |
| 7:30 PM | Pickering 90+3' | Report | | Stadium: Cashman Field; Attendance: 2,353; Referee: Brad Jensen |

| April 12 5 | Lexington SC | 0–0 | Las Vegas Lights FC | Lexington, Kentucky |
| 4:00 PM | | Report | Singer (yellow card) 62'; Nigro (yellow card) 65' | Stadium: Lexington SC Stadium; Attendance: 3,337; Referee: Calin Radosav |

| April 19 6 | Las Vegas Lights FC | 1–4 | FC Tulsa | Las Vegas, Nevada |
| 7:30 PM | Noël 51' (pen.) | Report | Lukic 14'; Calheira 28' (pen.), 67'; Dalou 42' | Stadium: Cashman Field; Referee: Matthew Corrigan |

===== May =====
| May 3 7 | Las Vegas Lights FC | 1–0 | Loudoun United FC | Las Vegas, Nevada |
| 7:30 PM | Rodriguez 25' | Report | | Stadium: Cashman Field; Attendance: 2,189; Referee: Muhammad Hassan |

| May 10 8 | Las Vegas Lights FC | 0–0 | Colorado Springs Switchbacks FC | Las Vegas, Nevada |
| 7:30 PM | | Report | | Stadium: Cashman Field; Attendance: 3,148; Referee: Brandon Stevis |

| May 17 9 | Sacramento Republic FC | 5–0 | Las Vegas Lights FC | Sacramento, California |
| 7:00 PM | Herrera 30'; Gurr 36'; Jamieson 44'; Ross 66' (pen.); Amann 86' | Report | | Stadium: Heart Health Park; Attendance: 10,194; Referee: Corbyn May |

| May 24 10 | Las Vegas Lights FC | 1–2 | El Paso Locomotive FC | Las Vegas, Nevada |
| 7:30 PM | Rodriguez 7' | Report | Cabrera 37', 64' | Stadium: Cashman Field; Attendance: 2,396; Referee: Joshua Encarnación |

| May 28 11 | Las Vegas Lights FC | 0–1 | Phoenix Rising FC | Las Vegas, Nevada |
| 7:30 PM | | Report | Okello 24' | Stadium: Cashman Field; Attendance: 2,165; Referee: Matthew Thompson |

===== June =====
| June 7 12 | San Antonio FC | 3–0 | Las Vegas Lights FC | San Antonio, Texas |
| 6:00 PM | Paredes 13' (pen.); Haakenson 27'; Hernandez 61' | Report | | Stadium: Toyota Field; Attendance: 5,393; Referee: Atahan Yaya |

| June 14 13 | Las Vegas Lights FC | 2–0 | Monterey Bay FC | Las Vegas, Nevada |
| 7:30 PM | Rodriguez 60', 65' | Report | | Stadium: Cashman Field; Attendance: 2,632; Referee: Cristian Campo Hernández |

| June 21 14 | Indy Eleven | 0–1 | Las Vegas Lights FC | Indianapolis, Indiana |
| 5:00 PM | | Report | Nigro (yellow card) 2'; Pickering 90' | Stadium: Carroll Stadium; Attendance: 9,132; Referee: John Griggs |

===== July =====
| July 4 15 | Las Vegas Lights FC | 0−2 | Sacramento Republic FC | Las Vegas, Nevada |
| 7:30 PM | Jones (yellow card) 4'; Boudadi (yellow card) 20'; Leal (yellow card) 45+1'; Nigro (yellow card) 78' | Report | Lopez (yellow card) 22'; Edwards 50'; Kleemann (yellow card) 53'; Cicerone 67' | Stadium: Cashman Field; Attendance: 3,538; Referee: Muhammad Hassan |

| July 12 16 | FC Tulsa | 4–3 | Las Vegas Lights FC | Tulsa, Oklahoma |
| 5:30 PM | Serrato 9'; Webber 16'; Calheira 76'; Gärtig 90+2' (o.g.) | Report | Rodriguez 33'; Smart 45+2', 62' | Stadium: ONEOK Field; Attendance: 2,605; Referee: Adorae Monroy |

| July 19 15 | Orange County SC | 4-0 | Las Vegas Lights FC | Irvine, California |
| 7:00 PM | Zubak 12'; Doghman 24'; War 41'; Hegardt 89' | Report | | Stadium: Championship Soccer Stadium; Attendance: 5,000; Referee: Elton García |

===== August =====
| August 2 18 | El Paso Locomotive FC | 6–0 | Las Vegas Lights FC | El Paso, Texas |
| 6:00 PM | Moreno 18'; Quezada 39'; Calvillo 52', 75'; Avila 62'; Rodriguez 89' | Report | | Stadium: Southwest University Park; Attendance: 4,722; Referee: Elijio Arreguin |

| August 9 19 | Las Vegas Lights FC | 1–1 | San Antonio FC | Las Vegas, Nevada |
| 7:30 PM | Rodriguez 53' (pen.) | Report | Berrón 18' | Stadium: Cashman Field; Attendance: 2,811; Referee: Gerald Flores |

| August 16 20 | New Mexico United | 2–2 | Las Vegas Lights FC | Albuquerque, New Mexico |
| 6:00 PM | Noël 5'; Maples (yellow card) 64' (yellow-red card) 66'; Amang 87' | Report | Herbert 12'; Pickering 74' | Stadium: Isotopes Park; Attendance: 11,581; Referee: Luis Arroyo |

| August 23 21 | Las Vegas Lights FC | 1–2 | North Carolina FC | Las Vegas, Nevada |
| 7:30 PM | Gannon 83' | Report | Dolabella 3'; Roberts 76' | Stadium: Cashman Field; Attendance: 2,504; Referee: Drew Klemp |

| August 30 22 | Las Vegas Lights FC | 1–0 | Lexington SC | Las Vegas, Nevada |
| 7:30 PM | Thompson 17' (o.g.) | Report | | Stadium: Cashman Field; Attendance: 2,245; Referee: Brandon Stevis |

===== September =====
| September 5 23 | Phoenix Rising FC | 0–0 | Las Vegas Lights FC | Phoenix, Arizona |
| 6:30 PM | | Report | | Stadium: Phoenix Rising Soccer Stadium; Attendance: 4,158; Referee: Cristian Campo Hernández |

| September 13 24 | Las Vegas Lights FC | 0–0 | Miami FC | Las Vegas, Nevada |
| 7:30 PM | | Report | | Stadium: Cashman Field; Attendance: 3,576; Referee: Abdou Ndiaye |

| September 20 25 | Louisville City FC | 3–1 | Las Vegas Lights FC | Louisville, Kentucky |
| 4:30 PM | Gleadle 6'; Perez 67'; Jones 84' | Report | McNamara (red card) 30'; Rodriguez 39' | Stadium: Lynn Family Stadium; Attendance: 10,825; Referee: Natalie Simon |

| September 27 26 | Pittsburgh Riverhounds SC | 1–0 | Las Vegas Lights FC | Pittsburgh, Pennsylvania |
| 4:00 PM | Williams 30' (pen.) | Report | | Stadium: Highmark Stadium; Attendance: 5,011; Referee: Amin Hadzic |

===== October =====
| October 5 27 | Rhode Island FC | 3−0 (F) | Las Vegas Lights FC | Pawtucket, Rhode Island |
| 2:00 PM | | Report | | Stadium: Centreville Bank Stadium; Attendance: 9,879; Referee: Ekaterina Koroleva |
Note: Though the match ended in a 3–1 win for Rhode Island, they were awarded a 3–0 forfeit victory due to Las Vegas Lights fielding an ineligible player, Vaughn Covil, starting in the 84th minute. All statistics from the game were wiped out. This included goals for RIFC by Bacharach, Fuson, and Williams in the 40th, 90th, and 90+5 minutes, and a Las Vegas goal by Stojanovic in the 46th minute. Yellow cards to Bacharach (40), Yao (62), Holstad (83) and Williams (90+5) for Rhode Island, and O'Driscoll (45+3) and Stojanovic (62) were all removed from official records.

| October 11 28 | Las Vegas Lights FC | 2–2 | Oakland Roots SC | Las Vegas, Nevada |
| 7:30 PM | Rodriguez 31'; Stojanovic 87' | Report | Wilson 29'; Trejo 56' | Stadium: Cashman Field; Attendance: 4,570; Referee: Joe Surgan |

| October 18 29 | Colorado Springs Switchbacks FC | 1−0 | Las Vegas Lights FC | Colorado Springs, Colorado |
| 5:00 PM | Fjeldberg 54' | Report | | Stadium: Weidner Field; Attendance: 7,364; Referee: Edson Carvajal |

| October 25 30 | Monterey Bay FC | 1–1 | Las Vegas Lights | Seaside, California |
| 7:00 PM | Malango 28' | Report | Leal 3' | Stadium: Cardinale Stadium; Attendance: 3,608; Referee: Robert Vincze |

==== USL Cup ====
The Lights participated in the second edition of the USL Cup, the first edition to feature teams from both the USL Championship and League One.

| April 26, 2025 | Orange County SC | 1–3 | Las Vegas Lights FC | Irvine, California |
| 7:00 PM PDT | Dunbar 45+3' (pen.) | Report | O'Driscoll 14'; Pinzón 34'; Rodriguez 56' (pen.) | Stadium: Championship Soccer Stadium; Attendance: 3,350; Referee: Gerald Flores |

| April 30, 2025 | Las Vegas Lights FC | 2–1 | AV Alta FC | Las Vegas, Nevada |
| 7:30 PM PDT | Pearson 4'; Pickering 73' | Report | Blancas 47' | Stadium: Cashman Field; Attendance: 1,795; Referee: Ekaterina Koroleva |

| May 31, 2025 | Sacramento Republic FC | 4–0 | Las Vegas Lights FC | Sacramento, California |
| 7:00 PM PDT | Spaulding 36'; Parano 37'; Benítez 53'; Cicerone 58' | Report | | Stadium: Heart Health Park; Attendance: 9,437; Referee: Abdou Ndiaye |

| June 28, 2025 | Las Vegas Lights FC | 2–0 | Spokane Velocity FC | Las Vegas, Nevada |
| 7:30 PM PDT | Stojanovic 35' (pen.); Pickering 51' | Report | | Stadium: Cashman Field; Attendance: 2,597; Referee: Servando Berna Rico |

==== US Open Cup ====
The Lights, as a member of the second division USL Championship, entered the U.S. Open Cup in the Third Round based on its performance in the 2024 USL Championship season. Drawn away against Division 3 USL League One club Chattanooga Red Wolves SC, the Lights lost in a penalty shootout.

| April 16 | Las Vegas Lights FC (USLC) (Nevada) | 2–2 (a.e.t.) (3–4 p) | (Tennessee) Chattanooga Red Wolves SC (USL1) | Las Vegas, Nevada |
| 7:30 p.m. PDT | Azcona 43'; Pinzón 62' | Report | Vazquez 19'; Hernández 48' (pen.) | Stadium: Cashman Field; Attendance: 1,061; Referee: Jaclyn Metz |
| | Penalties |
| | Pinzón (penalty missed); Pearson (penalty scored); O'Driscoll (penalty scored); Noël (penalty scored); Nigro (penalty missed) | | (penalty scored) Bentley; (penalty missed) Ualefi; (penalty scored) Hernandez; (penalty scored) Hernández; (penalty scored) Green |
