= 2024 Las Vegas Lights FC season =

Las Vegas Lights FC
2024 season
- Principal Owner: José Bautista
- Head coach: Dennis Sanchez
- Stadium: Cashman Field
- USL: Western Conference: 4th
- USL Cup Playoffs: Western Conference Finalists
- U.S. Open Cup: Round of 32
Home colors	Away colors

The 2024 Las Vegas Lights FC season was the club's seventh season, and their seventh season in the United Soccer League Championship (USLC), the second division of American soccer.

During the offseason, the Lights underwent some massive changes. On January 16, the Lights were bought out by an ownership group managed by former Major League Baseball player José Bautista. Additionally, the Lights hired a new head coach less than two weeks later on January 29, hiring Dennis Sanchez, a former assistant coach for MLS Next club Austin FC II.

== Squad ==
=== Roster ===
As of July 12, 2024

Note: Flags indicate national team as defined under FIFA eligibility rules; some limited exceptions apply. Players may hold more than one non-FIFA nationality.

No.	Pos.	Nation	Player
1	GK	SUI	Nicholas Ammeter
3	DF	USA	Hayden Sargis (on loan from D.C. United)
6	MF	ENG	Charlie Adams
7	MF	USA	Joe Gyau
9	FW	DOM	Riki Alba
10	FW	DOM	Edison Azcona
11	MF	USA	Coleman Gannon
13	MF	USA	Giovanni Aguilar
14	FW	GHA	Solomon Asante
20	DF	USA	Shawn Smart
21	DF	MNE	Emrah Klimenta
22	DF	USA	Joe Hafferty

No.	Pos.	Nation	Player
24	DF	JAM	Maliek Howell
26	MF	CMR	J.C. Ngando (on loan from Vancouver Whitecaps)
27	MF	FRA	Valentin Noël
29	MF	USA	Christian Pinzón
31	GK	USA	Austin Wormell
33	DF	USA	Gennaro Nigro
56	GK	CUB	Raiko Arozarena
72	DF	CIV	Gaoussou Samaké
77	MF	ESA	Alexander Romero
79	MF	HAI	All Gue
90	FW	JAM	Khori Bennett

USL Academy contract

=== Staff ===
Title	Name	Nation
Owner	José Bautista	Dominican Republic
Sporting director	Gianleonardo Neglia	Italy
Head coach	Dennis Sanchez	United States
Assistant coach	Gerson Echeverry	Colombia
Assistant coach	Ivan Mirkovic	Serbia
Goalkeeping coach	Armando Quezada	United States

== Competitions ==
=== USL Championship ===
==== Standings ====
Pos	Team	Pld	W	L	T	GF	GA	GD	Pts	Qualification
2	Colorado Springs Switchbacks FC (C)	34	15	12	7	48	40	+8	52	Playoffs
3	Memphis 901 FC	34	14	11	9	52	41	+11	51	Playoffs
4	Las Vegas Lights FC	34	13	10	11	49	46	+3	50	Playoffs
5	Sacramento Republic FC	34	13	11	10	46	34	+12	49	Playoffs
6	Orange County SC	34	13	14	7	38	45	−7	46	Playoffs

Source: USL Championship Standings
Rules for classification: 1) head-to-head points; 2) head-to-head goal differential; 3) points-per game within conference; 4) total wins; 5) total goal differential; 6) total goals scored; 7) points earned against top four Conference finishers; 8) disciplinary points; 9) coin toss or drawing of lots
(C) Champions

==== Match results ====
On December 18, 2023, the USL Championship released the regular season schedule for all 24 teams.

All times are in Pacific Standard Time.

===== March =====
March 9 1	Memphis 901 FC	2–1	Las Vegas Lights FC	Memphis, Tennessee
1:00 PM	Careaga 33'; Pickering 44'; Duncan (yellow card) 46'; Ward (yellow card) 80'	Report	Noël 22'; Azcona (yellow card) 40'	Stadium: AutoZone Park; Attendance: 3,290; Referee: Joshua Encarnación

March 16 2	Las Vegas Lights FC	1–3	FC Tulsa	Las Vegas, Nevada
5:00 PM	Alba 60'; Smart (yellow card) 85'; Berumen (yellow card) 90+5'	Report	Stojanovic 11' (yellow card) 14'; Goodrum 25'; Yosef 56'; Worth (yellow card) 90'	Stadium: Cashman Field; Attendance: 1,675; Referee: Brandon Stevis

March 23 3	Las Vegas Lights FC	1–0	El Paso Locomotive FC	Las Vegas, Nevada
5:00 PM	Garcia 33' (o.g.); Ngando (yellow card) 36'; Smart (yellow card) 77'; Gue (yellow card) 90+7'	Report	Hinds (yellow card) 32'; Stauffer (yellow card) 65'; Akinyode (yellow card) 67'; Dollenmayer (yellow card) 72'; Alfaro (yellow card) 78'; Zacarias (yellow card) 84'	Stadium: Cashman Field; Attendance: 1,070; Referee: Thomas Snyder

March 30 4	Oakland Roots SC	0–3	Las Vegas Lights FC	Hayward, California
7:00 PM	Nije (yellow card) 20'	Report	Klimenta (yellow card) 30'; Gannon 46'; Samake 50'; Azcona (yellow card) 63'; Noël 66' (yellow card) 69'; Smart (yellow card) 76'; Nigro (yellow card) 90+2'	Stadium: Pioneer Stadium; Attendance: 2,812; Referee: Matthew Corrigan

===== April =====
April 6 5	Las Vegas Lights FC	1–0	San Antonio FC	Las Vegas, Nevada
7:30 PM	Azcona (yellow card) 17'; Garcia (yellow card) 54'; Smart 56'	Report	Haakenson (yellow card) 38'; Silva (yellow card) 50'; Lambert (yellow card) 55'; Agudelo (yellow card) 76'; Taintor (yellow card) 77'; Lacey (yellow card) 90+6'	Stadium: Cashman Field; Attendance: 1,436; Referee: Greg Dopka

April 13 6	Monterey Bay FC	3–1	Las Vegas Lights FC	Seaside, California
7:00 PM	Dixon 10' (pen.); Trager 45'; Gonzalez 74'	Report	Samaké 45+1'	Stadium: Cardinale Stadium; Attendance: 3,524; Referee: Elijio Arreguin

April 20 7	Las Vegas Lights FC	1–2	Rhode Island FC	Las Vegas, NV
8:00 PM	Alba (yellow card) 28'; Nigro (yellow card) 45+2'; Noël 54'; Hafferty (yellow card) 74'	Report	Turnbull 25'; Lee (yellow card) 30'; Fuson 45'; Doyle (yellow card) 90+1'	Stadium: Cashman Field; Attendance: 1,943; Referee: Benjamin Meyer

April 27 8	Charleston Battery	6–0	Las Vegas Lights FC	Mount Pleasant, South Carolina
1:00 PM	Markanich 4' 30' 37' (pen.) 49'; Myers 22'; Molloy 81'	Report	Arozarena (yellow card) 24'; Adams (yellow card) 45+5'	Stadium: Patriots Point Soccer Complex; Attendance: 4,520; Referee: Joe Surgan

===== May =====
May 4 9	Las Vegas Lights FC	1–2	New Mexico United	Las Vegas, Nevada
6:30 PM	Adams (yellow card) 23'; Samake 44' (yellow card) 72'; Gannon (yellow card) 65'; Kimenta (yellow card) 72'	Report	Bruce 13' 30'; Herbert (yellow card) 39'; Astorga (yellow card) 82'; Tabakis (yellow card) 89'; Dubois (yellow card) 90+4'; Bailey (yellow card) 90+4'	Stadium: Cashman Field; Attendance: 1,061; Referee: Brad Jensen

May 11 10	San Antonio FC	1–1	Las Vegas Lights FC	San Antonio, Texas
6:00 PM	Burks (yellow card) 38'; Marcina (yellow card) 45'; Chol 45+2'; Hernández (yellow card) 47' (yellow-red card) 48'; Lambert (yellow card) 82'	Report	Klimenta (yellow card) 13'; Nigro (yellow card) 45'; Noël 59'	Stadium: Toyota Field; Attendance: 7,218; Referee: Elvis Osmanovic

May 18 11	Las Vegas Lights FC	2–2	Louisville City FC	Las Vegas, Nevada
7:30 PM	Noël 16'; Adams 36'; Smart (yellow card) 55'	Report	Davila 7'; Harris (yellow card) 48'; Adams (yellow card) 62'; Serrano 70'	Stadium: Cashman Field; Attendance: 1,048; Referee: Joshua Encarnacion; Assistant referees: Stephen McGonagle; William Aten; Fourth official: Pavel Georgiev

May 25 12	Tampa Bay Rowdies	1–0	Las Vegas Lights FC	St. Petersburg, Florida
4:30 PM	Munjoma (yellow card) 56'; Worth (yellow card) 81'; Jennings 85'	Report	Nigro (yellow card) 31'; Smart (yellow card) 68'; Azcona (yellow card) 71'	Stadium: Al Lang Stadium; Attendance: 5,753; Referee: Sergii Demianchuk

===== June =====
June 1 13	Las Vegas Lights FC	0–0	Phoenix Rising FC	Las Vegas, Nevada
7:30 PM	Adams (yellow card) 45+1'	PHX Report; LVL Result	Rito (yellow card) 21'; Fuenmayor (yellow card) 44'	Stadium: Cashman Field; Attendance: 1,720; Referee: Muhammad Hassan

June 8 14	Las Vegas Lights FC	3–1	Miami FC	Las Vegas, Nevada
7:30 PM	Nigro (yellow card) 40'; Bennett 45+3' 63' (pen.); Noël 82'	Report	López 25'; Mujeeb Murana (yellow card) 65'; Michael Lawrence (yellow card) 87'	Stadium: Cashman Field; Attendance: 1,748; Referee: (United States) Lorenzo Hernandez

June 14 15	Loudoun United FC	1–1	Las Vegas Lights FC	Leesburg, Virginia
7:00 PM	McCabe (yellow card) 24' (goal) 52'; Ryan (yellow card) 45+6'	Report	Gannon 2'; Bennett (yellow card) 36'; Howell (yellow card) 43'	Stadium: Segra Field; Attendance: 3,580; Referee: Nabil Bensalah

June 18 16	Las Vegas Lights FC	3–3	Colorado Springs Switchbacks FC	Las Vegas, Nevada
6:30 PM	Hafferty 28'; Bennett 45+4' (pen.); Noël 80'; Howell (yellow card) 82'	Report	Huerman 6' (yellow card) 22'; Santos (yellow card) 8'; Henríquez 31'; Lacroix (yellow card) 53'; Damus 89'	Stadium: Cashman Field; Attendance: 1,339; Referee: Elijio Arreguin

June 22 17	Las Vegas Lights FC	1–1	Memphis 901 FC	Las Vegas, Nevada
7:30 PM	Adams (yellow card) 54'; Howell (yellow card) 74'; Bennett 80' (pen.); Azcona (yellow card) 83'; Bennett (yellow card) 90'	Report	Lapa 43' (yellow card) 90+3'; Hyndman (yellow card) 62'; Paul (yellow card) 63'; Fernando (yellow card) 69'; Careaga (yellow card) 72'	Stadium: Cashman Field; Attendance: 1,657; Referee: Trevor Wiseman

June 29 18	Las Vegas Lights FC	2–0	Pittsburgh Riverhounds SC	Las Vegas, Nevada
7:30 PM	Bennett (yellow card) 26' (goal) 40' 87'; Romero (yellow card) 90+1'	Report	Osumanu (yellow card) 14'	Stadium: Cashman Field; Attendance: 1,893; Referee: John Griggs

===== July =====
July 3 19	Sacramento Republic FC	0–1	Las Vegas Lights FC	Sacramento, California
7:30 PM	Phillips (yellow card) 80'; Portillo (yellow card) 90+4'	Report	Pinzon 10'; Ngando (yellow card) 70'; Arozarena (yellow card) 71'; Nigro (yellow card) 75'	Stadium: Heart Health Park; Attendance: 8,988; Referee: Jeremy Scheer

July 12 20	El Paso Locomotive FC	0–2	Las Vegas Lights FC	El Paso, Texas
7:30 PM	Craig (yellow card) 2'; Borelli (yellow card) 59'	Report	Gannon 64'; Stauffer 83' (o.g.); Pinzón (yellow card) 89'	Stadium: Southwest University Park; Attendance: 6,727; Referee: Servando Berna Rico

July 26 21	Colorado Springs Switchbacks	1–1	Las Vegas Lights FC	Colorado Springs, Colorado
6:00 PM	Fjeldberg 30' (yellow card) 45+1'; Real (yellow card) 53'; Hanya (yellow card) 58'	Report	Smart 26' (yellow card) 73'; Doody (yellow card) 61'; Jabang (yellow card) 86'	Stadium: Weidner Field; Attendance: 8,023; Referee: Ricardo Fierro

July 31 22	New Mexico United	1–2	Las Vegas Lights FC	Albuquerque, New Mexico
6:00 PM	Bruce 45+5'; Houssou (yellow card) 85'	Report	Pinzón (yellow card) 4' (goal) 66'; Noël 12'; Nigro (yellow card) 79'; Jabang (yellow card) 90'	Stadium: Isotopes Park; Attendance: 7,558; Referee: Elvis Osmanovic

===== August =====
August 10 23	Las Vegas Lights FC	1–1	Detroit City FC	Las Vegas, Nevada
7:30 PM	Bennett (yellow card) 56' (goal) 66'	Report	Morris 39'; Murphy (yellow card) 54'	Stadium: Cashman Field; Attendance: 1,990; Referee: Gerald Flores

August 17 24	Hartford Athletic	2–1	Las Vegas Lights FC	Hartford, Connecticut
4:00 PM	Dieng 25'; Boudadi (yellow card) 43'; Ngalina 53'; Makangila (yellow card) 90+1'	Report	Doody (yellow card) 9'; Bennett 10'; Nigro (yellow card) 13'; Jabang (yellow card) 37'; Gyau (yellow card) 63'	Stadium: Trinity Health Stadium; Attendance: 4,933; Referee: Matthew Thompson

August 24 25	Las Vegas Lights FC	3–2	Indy Eleven	Las Vegas, NV
7:30 PM	Ngando 2'; Arozarena (yellow card) 21'; Ngando (yellow card) 33'; Noël 43'; Bennett 45+4'; Nigro (yellow card) 54'	Report	Guenzatti 26'; Collier 45+3'; Mines (yellow card) 56'	Stadium: Cashman Field; Attendance: 4,532; Referee: Trevor Wiseman

August 31 26	Orange County SC	2–3	Las Vegas Lights FC	Irvine, California
7:00 PM	Scott (yellow card) 6'; Zubak 11', 19'; Powers (yellow card) 37'; Norris (yellow card) 77'	Report	Bennett 39' (pen.) 63'; Shutler 87' (o.g.); Gyau (yellow card) 90+3'	Stadium: Championship Soccer Stadium; Attendance: 3,579; Referee: Ekaterina Koroleva

===== September =====
September 11 27	FC Tulsa	1–1	Las Vegas Lights FC	Tulsa, Oklahoma
6:30 PM	Diallo (yellow card) 31'; St. Clair (yellow card) 35'; Yosef 38'	Report	Doody (yellow card) 57'; Howell (yellow card) 76'; Gannon 78'	Stadium: ONEOK Field; Attendance: 2,663; Referee: Abdou Ndiaye

September 14 28	Las Vegas Lights	0–0	Monterey Bay FC	Las Vegas, Nevada
7:30 PM	Smart (yellow card) 15'	Report	Volesky (yellow card) 33'; Gnaulati (yellow card) 52'; Gonzalez (yellow card) 77'	Stadium: Cashman Field; Attendance: 1,627; Referee: Adam Kilpatrick

September 21 29	Las Vegas Lights FC	2–1	Sacramento Republic FC	Las Vegas, Nevada
7:30 PM	Bennett 29'; Noël (yellow card) 59'; Pinzon 71'; Jabang (yellow card) 73'	Report	Phillips 9'; Ukaegbu (red card) 76'; Portillo (yellow card) 81'; Viader (yellow card) 90+1'	Stadium: Cashman Field; Attendance: 2,240; Referee: Matthew Corrigan

September 28 30	Phoenix Rising FC	1–2	Las Vegas Lights FC	Phoenix, Arizona
6:30 PM	Boye (yellow card) 17'; Cabral 60'; Traore (yellow card) 70'; Fuenmayor (yellow card) 86'	Report	Jabang (yellow card) 74'; Ngando 90+6'; Doody 90+9'	Stadium: Phoenix Rising Soccer Stadium; Attendance: 6,073; Referee: Calin Radosav

===== October =====
October 5 31	Las Vegas Lights FC	1–1	Orange County SC	Las Vegas, Nevada
7:30 PM	Bennett 26'	Report	Hegardt 16'; Chattha (yellow card) 35'; Partida (yellow card) 37'; Nakkim (yellow card) 71'	Stadium: Cashman Field; Attendance: 1,828; Referee: Gerald Flores

October 13 32	Birmingham Legion FC	0–3	Las Vegas Lights FC	Birmingham, Alabama
2:00 PM	Hernandez-Foster (yellow card) 5'; Rufe (yellow card) 45'; Tabortetaka (yellow card) 64'	Report	Gyau 18'; Bennett (yellow card) 73'; Gannon 87'; Pinzon 90+3'	Stadium: Protective Stadium; Attendance: 4,761; Referee: Ricardo Fierro

October 19 33	Las Vegas Lights FC	2–3	Oakland Roots SC	Las Vegas, Nevada
	Hackshaw 12' (o.g.); Noël 90+4'	Report	Rodriguez 3', 72'; Njie (yellow card) 36'; Diaz (yellow card) 89'; Donasiyano (yellow card) 90+3'	Stadium: Cashman Field; Attendance: 2,878; Referee: Brandon Stevis

October 26 34	North Carolina FC	2–1	Las Vegas Lights FC	Cary, North Carolina
4:00 PM	Craig 12'; Martin (yellow card) 32'; Anderson 45' (yellow card) 45+1'; Perez (yellow card) 63'; McGuire (yellow card) 76'; Mentzingen (yellow card) 78'; Batista (yellow card) 90+8'	Report	Bennett 9'; Smart (yellow card) 37'	Stadium: WakeMed Soccer Park; Attendance: 6,083; Referee: Matthew Thompson

==== Playoffs ====
November 1, 2024 Conference Quarterfinals	Las Vegas Lights FC	0–0 (a.e.t.) (3–2 p)	Sacramento Republic FC	Las Vegas, Nevada
7:30 PM PDT	Noël (yellow card) 38'	Report	Ross (yellow card) 86'	Stadium: Cashman Field; Attendance: 2,415; Referee: Elton Garcia
	Penalties
	Bennett (penalty missed); Ngando (penalty missed); Gannon (penalty scored); Doody (penalty scored); Noël (penalty scored)		(penalty missed) Portillo; (penalty missed) Viader; (penalty missed) Cicerone; (penalty scored) Ross; (penalty scored) Felipe

November 9, 2024 Conference Semifinals	New Mexico United	0–1	Las Vegas Lights FC	Albuquerque, New Mexico
7:30 PM MST	Quill (yellow card) 40'; Akale (yellow card) 89'	Report	Hafferty (yellow card) 6'; Pinzón (yellow card) 54'; Bennett 86'; Gyau (yellow card) 87'	Stadium: Rio Grande Credit Union Field at Isotopes Park; Attendance: 10,049; Referee: Natalie Simon

November 16, 2024 Conference Finals	Colorado Springs Switchbacks	1–0	Las Vegas Lights FC	Colorado Springs, Colorado
7:00 PM (MST)	Tejada 38'; Henríquez (yellow card) 84'	Report	Howell (yellow card) 45'; Nigro (yellow card) 54'	Stadium: Weidner Field; Attendance: 8,023; Referee: Elton Garcia

=== U.S. Open Cup ===
As a member of the USL Championship, the Las Vegas Lights entered the U.S. Open Cup in the Third Round. It was announced by the U.S. Soccer Federation on April 4, 2024, that the Lights would face off against a member of the USL League One from Washington called the Spokane Velocity FC, a team in the third division of U.S. soccer. After winning 2–1 against Spokane at home, they were drawn on April 18 to play against Major League Soccer club, and eventual tournament winner, Los Angeles FC. The Lights would end up losing 1–3 at home.

April 17 Third Round	Las Vegas Lights FC (USLC) (Nevada)	2–1 (a.e.t.)	(Washington (state)) Spokane Velocity FC (USL1)	Las Vegas, Nevada
7:30 PM	Garcia (yellow card) 12'; Noël (yellow card) 16' (goal) 51'; Nigro (yellow card) 64'; Alba 112'	Report	Miller (yellow card) 43'; Waldeck (yellow card) 73' (yellow-red card) 90+3'; Lewis 90+6'	Stadium: Cashman Field; Attendance: 1,197; Referee: Alexis Da Silva

May 8 Round of 32	Las Vegas Lights FC (Nevada)	1–3	(California) Los Angeles FC	Las Vegas, Nevada
7:30 PM	Noël (yellow card) 10'; Azcona (yellow card) 45+2'; Smart 56'	Report	Atuesta (yellow card) 21'; Kamara 47'; Olivera 70', 90+1'; Sánchez (yellow card) 89'	Stadium: Cashman Field; Attendance: 3,495; Referee: James Duling
