= 2024 FC Tulsa season =

FC Tulsa
2024 season
- Head coach: Mario Sanchez
- Stadium: ONEOK Field; Tulsa, Oklahoma
- USL Championship: Conference: 10th Overall: 21st
- 2024 U.S. Open Cup: Round of 16
- Black Gold Derby: Not Held
Home colors	Away colors	Third colors

The 2024 FC Tulsa season was the franchise's 10th season in the USL Championship, the second-tier professional soccer league in the United States. The team also participated in the 2024 U.S. Open Cup.

On January 18, 2024, FC Tulsa announced a strategic partnership with Serie C team US Triestina Calcio 1918 covering all areas of technical squad management including scouting, data analysis, player development and operational best practices.

== Club ==
Squad no.	Name	Nationality	Position(s)	Date of birth (age)	Previous club
Goalkeepers
1	Michael Creek	(United States)	GK	March 5, 1998 (age 28)	(United States) Saint Louis City SC
24	Joey Roggeveen	(Netherlands)	GK	March 20, 1998 (age 28)	(Netherlands) FC Den Bosch
99	Johan Peñaranda	(United States)	GK	January 3, 2000 (age 26)	(United States) Northern Colorado Hailstorm
Defenders
20	Patrick Seagrist	(United States)	LB	February 21, 1998 (age 28)	(United States) Colorado Springs Switchbacks
2	Anthony Harper	(United States)	CB	April 4, 2007 (age 19)	(United States) Tulsa Soccer Club
3	Alexis Souahy	(Comoros)	CB	January 13, 1995 (age 31)	(United States) Union Omaha
12	Rashid Tetteh	(Ghana)	CB	July 14, 1995 (age 31)	(United States) New Mexico United
22	Bradley Bourgeois	(United States)	CB	April 13, 1994 (age 32)	(United States) Nashville SC
63	Sebastian Sanchez	(United States)	CB	December 20, 2003 (age 22)	(United States) Louisville City FC
4	Arthur Rogers	(England)	RB	September 26, 1996 (age 30)	(United States) Northern Colorado Hailstorm
26	Angel Bernal	(United States)	RB	February 26, 2005 (age 21)	(United States) FC Dallas Academy
31	Owen Damm	(United States)	RB	August 22, 2003 (age 23)	(United States) Louisville City FC
47	Harvey St Clair	(Scotland)	RB	November 13, 1998 (age 27)	(Italy) Vis Pesaro
Midfielders
5	Camilo Ponce	(United States)	AM	December 5, 2003 (age 22)	(United States) Wake Forest Demon Deacons
14	Luca Sowinski	(United States)	AM	June 5, 2004 (age 22)	(United States) Charlotte Independence
6	Boubacar Diallo	(Senegal)	CM	December 9, 2002 (age 23)	(United States) Philadelphia Union II
8	Blaine Ferri	(United States)	CM	September 29, 2000 (age 26)	(United States) North Texas SC
33	Aaron Kacinari	(Slovenia)	CM	August 18, 2001 (age 25)	(Italy) US Triestina Calcio 1918
77	Faysal Bettache	(England)	CM	July 7, 2000 (age 26)	(United States) Tacoma Defiance
11	Milo Yosef	(Germany)	RM	September 11, 1998 (age 28)	(United States) Marshall Thundering Herd
17	Edwin Laszo	(Colombia)	DM	March 2, 1999 (age 27)	(Bulgaria) Beroe
66	Santiago Sanchez	(United States)	MF	January 20, 2008 (age 18)	(United States) FC Tulsa Academy
Forwards
10	Matthew Bell	(Jamaica)	LW	August 27, 2002 (age 24)	(United States) Real Salt Lake
19	Stefan Stojanovic	(United States)	FW	March 3, 2001 (age 25)	(United States) Philadelphia Union II
21	Alex Dalou	(United States)	FW	August 24, 2000 (age 26)	(United States) Albion San Diego
29	Aaron Bibout	(Cameroon)	FW	September 3, 2004 (age 22)	(United States) Los Angeles Galaxy
70	Diogo Pacheco	(Portugal)	LW	September 13, 1998 (age 28)	(United States) Minnesota United FC 2

USL Academy player
On Loan

=== Staff ===
As of January 16, 2024

- (United States) Mario Sanchez – head coach and technical director
- (United States) Luke Spencer – first assistant coach
- (England) Adam Lewis – goalkeeping coach
- (United States) Johnathon Millwee – head athletic trainer

== Competitions ==
=== Preseason ===
FC Tulsa announced their full preseason schedule on January 24, 2024. FC Tulsa withdrew from the Huntsville City FC Blastoff Battle on February 2. FC Tulsa added a friendly with Tulsa Athletic on February 7. FC Tulsa's preseason match against Missouri State Bears scheduled for February 11 was canceled due to inclement weather, and an intrasquad scrimmage was played instead.

February 3 Preseason 1	FC Tulsa	4–1	Oral Roberts Golden Eagles	Tulsa, Oklahoma
1:00 p.m. CST	Bourgeois 33'; Bernal 58'; Yosef 63'; Stojanovic 80'	Report	51'	Stadium: Titan Sports Complex

February 7 Preseason 2	FC Tulsa	3–0	Tulsa Athletic	Tulsa, Oklahoma
7:00 p.m. CST	Stojanovic 60'; Trialist 73'; Trialist 88'	Report		Stadium: Titan Sports Complex; Attendance: 0
Note: Match closed to public.

February 17 Preseason 3	FC Tulsa	0–1	Missouri State Bears	Tulsa, Oklahoma
1:00 p.m. CST				Stadium: Titan Sports Complex
Note: Postponed from February 11 due to inclement weather.

February 25 Preseason 4	FC Tulsa	1–1	Union Omaha	Tulsa, Oklahoma
12:00 p.m. CST		Report		Stadium: Hurricane Soccer & Track Stadium
Note: FC Tulsa Round Robin

March 2 Preseason 5	Sporting Kansas City II	1–1	FC Tulsa	Wichita, Kansas
1:00 p.m. CST				Stadium: Stryker Sports Complex

March 9 Preseason 6	North Texas SC	0–3	FC Tulsa	Frisco, Texas
11:00 a.m. CST			Goodrum 43', 82'; Stojanovic 45'	Stadium: Toyota Stadium

=== USL Championship ===
==== Standings — Western Conference ====
Pos	Team	Pld	W	L	T	GF	GA	GD	Pts	Qualification
1	New Mexico United	34	18	11	5	46	44	+2	59	Playoffs
2	Colorado Springs Switchbacks FC (C)	34	15	12	7	48	40	+8	52	Playoffs
3	Memphis 901 FC	34	14	11	9	52	41	+11	51	Playoffs
4	Las Vegas Lights FC	34	13	10	11	49	46	+3	50	Playoffs
5	Sacramento Republic FC	34	13	11	10	46	34	+12	49	Playoffs
6	Orange County SC	34	13	14	7	38	45	−7	46	Playoffs
7	Oakland Roots SC	34	13	16	5	37	57	−20	44	Playoffs
8	Phoenix Rising FC	34	11	14	9	33	39	−6	42	Playoffs
9	San Antonio FC	34	10	15	9	36	49	−13	39	
10	FC Tulsa	34	9	14	11	33	48	−15	38	
11	Monterey Bay FC	34	8	16	10	29	44	−15	34	
12	El Paso Locomotive FC	34	8	18	8	27	46	−19	32	

Source: USL Championship Standings
Rules for classification: 1) head-to-head points; 2) head-to-head goal differential; 3) points-per game within conference; 4) total wins; 5) total goal differential; 6) total goals scored; 7) points earned against top four Conference finishers; 8) disciplinary points; 9) coin toss or drawing of lots
(C) Champions

==== Match results ====
March 16 1	Las Vegas Lights FC	1–3	FC Tulsa	Las Vegas, Nevada
5:00 PM PDT	Alba 60'	Report	Stojanovic 11'; Goodrum 25'; Yosef 56'	Stadium: Cashman Field; Attendance: 1,675; Referee: Brandon Stevis

March 30 2	Orange County SC	1–0	FC Tulsa	Irvine, California
6:00 PM PDT	Djeffal 27'	Report		Stadium: Championship Soccer Stadium; Attendance: 3,573; Referee: Trevor Wiseman

April 5 3	FC Tulsa	3–3	Phoenix Rising FC	Tulsa, Oklahoma
7:30 PM CDT	Stojanovic 1'; Laszo 50'; Souahy 57'	Report	Cabral 39' (pen.), 42'; Formella 73' (pen.)	Stadium: ONEOK Field; Attendance: 5,135; Referee: Matthew Corrigan

April 13 4	Sacramento Republic FC	1–1	FC Tulsa	Sacramento, California
6:00 PM PDT	López 33'	Report	Seagrist 64'	Stadium: Heart Health Park; Attendance: 8,891; Referee: Ricardo Fierro

April 20 5	FC Tulsa	1–4	Charleston Battery	Tulsa, Oklahoma
5:00 PM CDT	Portillo 37' (pen.)	Report	Myers 9', 84'; Torres 31'; Markanich 41'	Stadium: ONEOK Field; Attendance: 3,454; Referee: Kyle Johnston

April 27 6	El Paso Locomotive FC	0–1	FC Tulsa	El Paso, Texas
7:00 PM MDT		Report	Diallo 53'	Stadium: Southwest University Park; Attendance: 6,142; Referee: Lorenzo Hernandez

May 4 7	Birmingham Legion FC	2–2	FC Tulsa	Birmingham, Alabama
6:30 PM CDT	Martínez 71'; Pinho 90+4'	Report	Goodrum 21'; Stojanovic 57'	Stadium: Protective Stadium; Referee: Nabil Bensalah

May 11 8	FC Tulsa	2–2	Pittsburgh Riverhounds SC	Tulsa, Oklahoma
7:30 PM CDT	Perrotta 12' (o.g.); Diallo 33'	Report	Griffin 64' (pen.); Sterling 85'	Stadium: ONEOK Field; Attendance: 4,486; Referee: Elijio Arreguin

May 18 9	Tampa Bay Rowdies	5–0	FC Tulsa	St. Petersburg, Florida
7:30 CDT	Arteaga 12' 45+2' (pen.); Jennings 22'; Lasso 40', 71'; Worth (yellow card) 84'	Report	Laszo (yellow card) 45+1'; Diallo (yellow card) 60'; Dalou (yellow card) 90+1'	Stadium: Al Lang Stadium; Attendance: 5,277; Referee: Eric Tattersall

May 24 10	FC Tulsa	0–1	Oakland Roots SC	Tulsa, Oklahoma
7:30 PM CDT	Goodrum (yellow card) 45+3'; Dalou (yellow card) 83'	Report	Chéry 20'; Matsoso (yellow card) 38'; Riley (yellow card) 69'; Diaz (yellow card) 90+5'; Blanchette (yellow card) 90+5'	Stadium: ONEOK Field; Attendance: 3,642; Referee: Muhammad Hassan

June 1 11	Loudoun United FC	3–0	FC Tulsa	Leesburg, Virginia
7:00 PM EDT	Valot 8'; Skundrich (yellow card) 35'; Ryan 45'; Dambrot 54'	Report	Seagrist (yellow card) 15'; Damm (yellow card) 38'; Bourgeois (yellow card) 45+2'; Diallo (yellow card) 70'	Stadium: Segra Field

June 8 12	FC Tulsa	2–1	San Antonio FC	Tulsa, Oklahoma
7:30 PM CDT	Pacheco 48', 61'	Report	Hernandez 90'	Stadium: ONEOK Field; Attendance: 5,073; Referee: Brandon Stevis

June 19 13	FC Tulsa	2–1	Miami FC	Tulsa, Oklahoma
7:30 PM CDT	Goodrum 61'; Pacheco 71'	Report	Gavilanes 11'	Stadium: ONEOK Field; Attendance: 3,009; Referee: Christopher Calderon

June 22 14	FC Tulsa	0–0	Sacramento Republic FC	Tulsa, Oklahoma
7:30 PM CDT		Report		Stadium: ONEOK Field; Attendance: 3,433; Referee: John Matto

July 4 15	Colorado Springs Switchbacks FC	1–0	FC Tulsa	Colorado Springs, Colorado
7:00 PM MDT	Zandi 90+3'	Report		Stadium: Weidner Field; Attendance: 8,023; Referee: Gerald Flores

July 13 16	Monterey Bay FC	0–0	FC Tulsa	Seaside, California
7:00 PM PDT		Report		Stadium: Cardinale Stadium; Attendance: 4,011; Referee: Benjamin Meyer

July 20 17	FC Tulsa	1–0	Memphis 901 FC	Tulsa, Oklahoma
7:30 PM CDT	Goodrum 41'	Report	Marlon (red card) 88'; Cissoko (red card) 90+5'	Stadium: ONEOK Field; Attendance: 3,950; Referee: Alyssa Nichols

July 26 18	FC Tulsa	0–0	Indy Eleven	Tulsa, Oklahoma
7:30 PM CDT		Report		Stadium: ONEOK Field; Attendance: 3,490; Referee: Lorenzo Hernandez

August 3 19	San Antonio FC	1–3	FC Tulsa	San Antonio, Texas
8:00 PM CDT	Solignac 15'	Report	Goodrum 42'; Laszo 49'; Stojanovic 82'	Stadium: Toyota Field; Referee: John Griggs

August 9 20	FC Tulsa	0–0	Orange County SC	Tulsa, Oklahoma
7:30 PM CDT		Report		Stadium: ONEOK Field; Attendance: 4,411; Referee: Calin Radosav

August 14 21	New Mexico United	3–3	FC Tulsa	Albuquerque, New Mexico
7:00 PM MDT	Reyes 3'; Micaletto (yellow card) 13'; Houssou (yellow card) 43'; Swartz 49', 63'; Tabakis (yellow card) 79'	Report	Diallo (yellow card) 8'; Souahy 15', 44'; Pacheco 45+1'; Yosef (yellow card) 68'; Stojanovic (yellow card) 79'; St Clair (yellow card) 90+4'	Stadium: Isotopes Park; Attendance: 7,015; Referee: Sergii Demianchuk

August 17 22	Memphis 901 FC	2–0	FC Tulsa	Memphis, Tennessee
7:30 PM CDT	Lapa 35' (pen.); Careaga 68'	Report		Stadium: AutoZone Park; Attendance: 2,868; Referee: Eric Tattersall

August 24 23	Detroit City FC	1–0	FC Tulsa	Hamtramck, Michigan
6:00 PM CDT	Diop (yellow card) 70'	Report	Bibout 14' (yellow card) 54'; St. Clair (yellow card) 22' (yellow-red card) 66'; Diallo (yellow card) 27'; Pacheco (yellow card) 90+7'	Stadium: Keyworth Stadium; Attendance: 6,124; Referee: Alejo Calume

September 1 24	FC Tulsa	1–4	Colorado Springs Switchbacks FC	Tulsa, Oklahoma
5:00 PM CDT	Booth (yellow card) 62' (goal) 90+3'	Report	Henríquez 2'; Real (yellow card) 21' (goal) 69'; Damus 37'; Lacroix 45+1'; Pierre (yellow card) 51'; Fjellberg (yellow card) 83'	Stadium: ONEOK Field; Attendance: 3,666; Referee: Elton García

September 6 25	Phoenix Rising FC	1–0	FC Tulsa	Phoenix, Arizona
9:00 PM MDT	Ángel 45+4' (pen.) (yellow card) 70'; Fuenmayor (yellow card) 87'	Report	Bell (yellow card) 65'	Stadium: Phoenix Rising FC Soccer Complex

September 11 26	FC Tulsa	1–1	Las Vegas Lights FC	Tulsa, Oklahoma
7:30 PM CDT	Diallo (yellow card) 31'; St. Clair (yellow card) 35'; Yosef 38'	Report	Doody (yellow card) 57'; Howell (yellow card) 76'; Gannon 78'	Stadium: ONEOK Field; Attendance: 2,663; Referee: Abdou Ndiaye

September 14 27	FC Tulsa	0-1	Louisville City FC	Tulsa, Oklahoma
7:30 PM CDT	Tetteh (yellow card) 20'; Bourgeois (yellow card) 29'; Souahy (yellow card) 68'; St Clair (yellow card) 71'	Report	Wilson 33'; Wynder (yellow card) 55'; Adams (yellow card) 84'	Stadium: ONEOK Field; Attendance: 2,818; Referee: Brad Jensen

September 21 28	Rhode Island FC	2-1	FC Tulsa	Smithfield, Rhode Island
7:30 PM EDT	Yao (yellow card) 14'; Herivaux (yellow card) 31'; Fuson (yellow card) 64' (goal) 69'; Dikwa 90+2'	Report	Bibout 8'; Diallo (yellow card) 45+3'; Peñaranda (yellow card) 58'	Stadium: Beirne Stadium

September 29 29	Oakland Roots SC	0-1	FC Tulsa	Hayward, California
3:00 PM PDT	Dwyer (yellow card) 74'; Margvelashvili (yellow card) 75'	Report	Bibout 7' (yellow card) 45+3'; Pacheco (yellow card) 76'; Damm (yellow card) 78'; Souahy (yellow card) 87'	Stadium: Pioneer Stadium; Attendance: 4,190; Referee: Thomas Snyder

October 5 30	FC Tulsa	0-1	El Paso Locomotive FC	Tulsa, Oklahoma
7:30 PM CDT	Bourgeois (yellow card) 34' (yellow-red card) 71'; Diallo (yellow card) 45'; Souahy (yellow card) 60'; St Clair (yellow card) 79'; Bibout (yellow card) 90+7'	Report	Alfaro (yellow card) 4'; Coronado 20'; Dollenmayer (yellow card) 44'; Moreno (yellow card) 57'; Escoto (yellow card) 58'	Stadium: ONEOK Field; Attendance: 3,092; Referee: Jeremy Scheer

October 9 31	North Carolina FC	2-0	FC Tulsa	Cary, North Carolina
7:00 PM EDT	da Costa 19'; Perez (yellow card) 30'; Armstrong (yellow card) 36'; Conway 81' (pen.)	Report	Seagrist (yellow card) 22'; Bibout (yellow card) 33'; Booth (yellow card) 45+3'; Seb. Sanchez (yellow card) 84'	Stadium: WakeMed Soccer Park

October 12 32	FC Tulsa	1-1	New Mexico United	Tulsa, Oklahoma
7:30 PM CDT	Bibout 69'; St Clair (yellow card) 87'	Report	Reyes 55'; Seymore (yellow card) 79'; Hernandez (yellow card) 81'	Stadium: ONEOK Field; Attendance: 3,388

October 19 33	FC Tulsa	1-2	Hartford Athletic	Tulsa, Oklahoma
5:00 PM CDT	Stojanovic 10' (pen.); Bettache (yellow card) 89'; Bell (yellow card) 90+8'	Report	Souahy 24' (o.g.); Edwards 80'	Stadium: ONEOK Field; Attendance: 2,573

October 26 34	FC Tulsa	2-1	Monterey Bay F.C.	Tulsa, Oklahoma
7:00 PM CDT	Souahy 10'; Booth 31'	Report	Gutierrez 59'; Volesky (yellow card) 82'	Stadium: ONEOK Field; Attendance: 3,762

=== U.S. Open Cup ===
April 17 Third Round	FC Tulsa	2–1	N. Colorado Hailstorm FC	Tulsa, Oklahoma
7:00 PM CDT	Pacheco 39' (pen.); Yosef 45+1'	Report	Martinez 65'	Stadium: University of Tulsa Soccer and Track Stadium; Referee: Lorenzo Hernandez

May 7 Round of 32	Pittsburgh Riverhounds SC	0–1	FC Tulsa	Pittsburgh, Pennsylvania
7:00 PM EDT		Report	Goodrum 88'	Stadium: Highmark Stadium; Referee: Geoff Cameron

May 21 Round of 16	Sporting Kansas City	4–0	FC Tulsa	Kansas City, Kansas
7:30 PM CDT				Stadium: Children's Mercy Park
