= Nate Jones =

Nate Jones may refer to:

- Nate Jones (boxer) (born 1972), American former boxer
- Nate Jones (cornerback) (born 1982), American former gridiron football cornerback, later a football official
- Nate Jones (wide receiver) (born 1985), American former gridiron football wide receiver
- Nate Jones (baseball) (born 1986), American baseball pitcher
- Nate Jones (soccer) (born 2001), American soccer player
- Nate Jones On Bass, American bassist, songwriter, and producer

== See also ==
- Nathan Jones (disambiguation)
- Nathaniel Jones (disambiguation)
