= Dennis Sanchez (soccer) =

Soccer coach

Team information
- Current team: New Mexico United (head coach)

Senior career*
Years	Team	Apps	(Gls)
- San Diego State Aztecs

Managerial career
- 2016–2019: Columbus Crew (Academy general manager)
- 2020–2021: Sacramento Republic FC (Academy director)
- 2022: Charleston Battery (assistant)
- 2023: Austin FC II (assistant)
- 2024: Las Vegas Lights FC
- 2025–: New Mexico United
- * Club domestic league appearances and goals

Dennis Sanchez is a professional soccer coach and a former collegiate player. He is currently the head coach of New Mexico United in the USL Championship.

== Early life and college ==
Sanchez grew up playing soccer in Northern California, and played at college soccer at San Diego State University (SDSU) in San Diego, California. He recalled wanting to become a coach instead of a professional player.

== Coaching career ==
Sanchez started his coaching career as an assistant coach at SDSU following his graduation.

After leaving SDSU, Sanchez served as the Academy General Manager for the Columbus Crew in Major League Soccer, where he was in charge of the club's culture, scouting and recruitment, and implementing an "integrated methodology". He then served as the Academy Director at Sacramento Republic FC, where he helped sign Mario Penagos, Rafael Jauregui, and Hayden Sargis, with Sargis going on to earn a nomination for the USL Championship's Young Player of the Year award in 2020.

Sanchez was hired as an assistant coach with Charleston Battery in the USL for the 2022 season, and served as the interim head coach for the club's final game of the season. During his tenure in Charleston, he recruited Fidel Barajas, who went on to win the USL-C Young Player of the Year award in 2023. He was an assistant coach with Austin FC II in MLS Next Pro for the 2023 season, where he helped the club win that season's championship title.

In his first full-time position, Sanchez was hired as the head coach of Las Vegas Lights FC in 2024, succeeding Isidro Sánchez, and led team to the best season in its history and earning its first playoff appearance. That season, the Lights finished fourth in the Western Conference, going on to defeat NMU before being eliminated by Colorado Springs Switchbacks FC. The Lights set club records in the 2024 season with 13 wins, 50 points, and its highest table placement. He was nominated as a finalist for the 2024 USL Championship Coach of the Year award.

He was hired as the head coach of New Mexico United in December 2024 following his departure from the Lights after a historic season. As the head coach, Sanchez stated that while he didn't necessarily see himself returning to the state, he does have "a connection" to New Mexico. In September 2026, Sanchez and New Mexico United agreed to a contract extension through the 2028 season.

== Personal life ==
Sanchez states he feels an "unusual connection" to New Mexico as both his grandfather and great-grandfather were born near Albuquerque.

Sanchez's youngest brother, Cooper Sanchez, is a United States youth international midfielder who plays for Major League Soccer side Atlanta United.
