= 2020 Sacramento Republic FC season =

Sacramento Republic FC
2020 season
- Owner: Kevin M. Nagle
- Head coach: Simon Elliott
- Stadium: Papa Murphy's Park
- USL Championship: Conference: 5th Group A: 2nd
- USL Playoffs: Conf. Quarterfinals
- U.S. Open Cup: Cancelled
- Average home league attendance: 11,569
- Biggest win: SAC 4–0 POR (Oct. 3)
- Biggest defeat: LA 1–0 SAC (July 25); TAC 1–0 SAC (Sept. 30); PHX 1–0 SAC (Oct. 10)
Home colors	Away colors

The 2020 Sacramento Republic FC season was the club's seventh season of existence. The club played in the USL Championship (USLC), the second tier of the American soccer pyramid. Sacramento Republic FC competed in the Western Conference of the USL Championship. This article covers the period from November 18, 2019, the day after the 2019 USLC Playoff Final, to the conclusion of the 2020 USLC Playoff Final, scheduled for November 12–16, 2020.

== Club ==
=== Roster ===
As of February 11, 2020

No.	Position	Nation	Player
2	DF	TRI	Shannon Gomez
3	DF	USA	Hayden Sargis
4	DF	USA	Tomas Hilliard-Arce
5	DF	USA	Matt Mahoney
8	MF	USA	Rodrigo López
9	FW	USA	Kharlton Belmar
10	FW	POL	Dariusz Formella
11	MF	USA	Sam Werner
12	MF	USA	Drew Skundrich
14	DF	USA	Ashkanov Apollon
15	DF	SLV	Juan Barahona
18	GK	DOM	Rafael Díaz
20	MF	BUL	Villyan Bijev
21	DF	ISR	Dekel Keinan
22	MF	USA	Julian Chavez
23	MF	USA	Mario Penagos
24	MF	USA	Jaime Villarreal
28	MF	USA	Andrew Wheeler-Omiunu
30	DF	USA	Jordan McCrary
31	FW	USA	Cameron Iwasa
32	DF	USA	Aris Yang
48	DF	USA	Eddy Berumen
49	GK	USA	Diego Ramos
99	GK	USA	Adam Grinwis

USL Academy contract

=== Staff ===
As of January 23, 2020

Position	Name
General Manager	(United States) Todd Dunivant
Head Coach	(England) Mark Briggs
Goalkeeper Coach	(France) Romuald Peiser
Strength and Conditioning Coach	(United States) Luke Rayfield
Head Athletic Trainer	(United States) Aung Aye

== Competitions ==
=== Exhibitions ===
February 5 Preseason 1	Seattle Sounders FC	6–2	Sacramento Republic FC	Seattle, Washington
PST	Ruidíaz 2'; Shipp 9'; Morris 35'; Dhillon 78', 97'; A. Roldan 117'	Report	Werner 72'; Iwasa 96'	Stadium: CenturyLink Field
Note: 120-minute scrimmage.

February 21 Preseason 2	San Jose Earthquakes	1–3	Sacramento Republic FC	San Jose, California
PST	Ríos 13'	Report	Iwasa 7'; Skundrich 11', 29'	Stadium: Earthquakes Stadium

February 29 Preseason 3	Sacramento Republic FC	v	Real Monarchs	Sacramento, California
PST				Stadium: Papa Murphy's Park

=== USL Championship ===
==== Standings — Group A ====
Pos	Team	Pld	W	D	L	GF	GA	GD	Pts	PPG	Qualification
1	Reno 1868 FC	16	11	3	2	43	21	+22	36	2.25	Advance to USL Championship Playoffs
2	Sacramento Republic FC	16	8	6	2	27	17	+10	30	1.88	Advance to USL Championship Playoffs
3	Tacoma Defiance	16	4	2	10	25	32	−7	14	0.88	
4	Portland Timbers 2	16	3	0	13	20	50	−30	9	0.56	

Source: USL

==== Match results ====
March 7 1	Sacramento Republic FC	1–1	FC Tulsa	Sacramento, California
7:30 PM PST	Skundrich (yellow card) 23', (goal) 42'; Sargis (yellow card) 28'; Barahona (yellow card) 32'	Report	Moloto (yellow card) 24'; Sheldon (yellow card) 60'; Garcia (yellow card) 68' da Costa 79'; Martínez (yellow card) 90+3'	Stadium: Papa Murphy's Park; Attendance: 11,569; Referee: Elijio Arreguin

In the preparations for the resumption of league play following the shutdown prompted by the COVID-19 pandemic, the remainder of Republic FC's schedule was announced on July 2.

July 13 2	Sacramento Republic FC	3–3	Tacoma Defiance	Sacramento, California
7:00 PM PDT	Formella 8' (pen.), 37'; Hillard-Arce 23'; Villareal (yellow card) 84'; Skundrich (yellow card) 90+1'	Report	Diaz 1'; Daley 57'; Serrano 81'	Stadium: Papa Murphy's Park; Attendance: 0 Referee: Elijio Arreguin

July 19 3	Sacramento Republic FC	1–0	Reno 1868 FC	Sacramento, California
6:00 PM PDT	McCrary (yellow card) 74'; Iwasa 90+2' (pen.)	Report	Langsdorf (yellow card) 19'; Dabo (yellow card) 88'	Stadium: Papa Murphy's Park; Attendance: 0 Referee: Nicholas Marin

July 25 4	LA Galaxy II	1–0	Sacramento Republic FC	Carson, California
7:00 PM PDT	Vázquez (yellow card) 36'; Williams 72'; Hernandez (yellow card) 90+8'	Report	McCrary (yellow card) 16'; Villarreal (yellow card) 27'; Iwasa (yellow card) 67'	Stadium: Dignity Health Sports Park; Attendance: 0 Referee: Brandon Stevis

July 29 5	Sacramento Republic FC	v	Orange County SC	Sacramento, California
8:00 PM PDT				Stadium: Papa Murphy's Park

August 1 6	San Diego Loyal SC	0–0	Sacramento Republic FC	San Diego, California
7:00 PM PDT	Spencer (yellow card) 41'; Klimenta (yellow card) 66'; Avila (yellow card) 85'	Report	Wheeler-Omiunu (yellow card) 55'; Hilliard-Arce (yellow card) 71'; Skundrich (yellow card) 88'; Iwasa (yellow card) 90+3'	Stadium: Torero Stadium; Attendance: 0 Referee: Alejandro Mariscal

August 8 7	Portland Timbers 2	0–1	Sacramento Republic FC	Portland, Oregon
7:00 PM PDT	Molloy (yellow card) 52'; Krolicki (yellow card) 54'; Hanson (yellow card) 84'	Report	Leeker 12' (o.g.); Mahoney (yellow card) 82' (yellow-red card) 90+2'; Sargis (yellow card) 90+6'	Stadium: Providence Park; Referee: Adorae Monroy

August 12 8	Reno 1868 FC	0–1	Sacramento Republic FC	Reno, Nevada
7:15 PM PDT	Partida (yellow card) 80'; Dabo (yellow card) 82'	Report	McCrary (yellow card) 21'; Sargis (yellow card) 38'; Bijev 45+2' (pen.), (yellow card) 71'; Keinan (yellow card) 56'; R. Lopez (yellow card) 75'	Stadium: Greater Nevada Field; Attendance: 0 Referee: Ismir Pekmic

August 15 9	Sacramento Republic FC	3–1	Tacoma Defiance	Sacramento, California
8:00 PM (PDT)	Formella 14', 41'; Iwasa 33'; Belmar (yellow card) 54'; McCrary (yellow card) 84'	Report	Hinds (yellow card) 42'; Rogers 50'	Stadium: Papa Murphy's Park; Attendance: 0 Referee: Ricardo Fierro

August 22 10	Sacramento Republic FC	2–1	Portland Timbers 2	Sacramento, California
8:00 PM PDT	R. Lopez (yellow card) 45+2'; Skundrich 60'; Iwasa 69'; Apollon (yellow card) 82'	Report	González Asensi 23'; Molloy (yellow card) 75'	Stadium: Papa Murphy's Park; Attendance: 0 Referee: Nicholas Marin

September 2 11	Portland Timbers 2	1–2	Sacramento Republic FC	Portland, Oregon
7:30 PM PDT	Epps (yellow card) 80'; Clapier 90+2'	Report	Skundrich (yellow card) 49'; R. Lopez (yellow card) 72'; Gomez (yellow card) 81'; Penagos 87'; Chavez 90+6'	Stadium: Providence Park; Attendance: 0 Referee: Farhad Dadkho

September 9 5	Sacramento Republic FC	2–1	Orange County SC	Sacramento, California
7:30 PM PDT	Formella (yellow card) 48', (goal) 79'; R. Lopez (red card) 58'; Bijev 87'	Report	Okoli 5'; Quinn (yellow card) 34'; Palmer (yellow card) 72'	Stadium: Papa Murphy's Park; Attendance: 0 Referee: Elijio Arreguin
Note: Re-schedule of postponed July 29, 2020 match.

September 12 12	Sacramento Republic FC	3–3	Reno 1868 FC	Sacramento, California
7:30 PM PDT	Werner 5'; Formella 32'; Villarreal 73'; Belmar (yellow card) 80'	Report	Langsdorf 2'; Partida 67', (yellow card) 84'; Alfaro (yellow card) 79'; Apodaca 90+3', (yellow card) 90+4'	Stadium: Papa Murphy's Park; Attendance: 0 Referee: Chris Ruska

September 20 13	Sacramento Republic FC	3–3	Tacoma Defiance	Sacramento, California
7:30 PM PDT	Keinan (yellow card) 45+4'; Bijev 48'; Skundrich (yellow card) 56'; Belmar 60' (pen.); R. Lopez 90'; Sargis (yellow card) 90+4'	Report	Pérez 3'; Kitahara (yellow card) 15'; Díaz 66', (yellow card) 80'; Serrano 86'	Stadium: Papa Murphy's Park; Attendance: 0 Referee: Nicholas Marin

September 26 14	Reno 1868 FC	1–1	Sacramento Republic FC	Reno, Nevada
6:15 PM PDT	Rivas (yellow card) 5'; Richards 44'; Langsdorf (yellow card) 45+1'; Alfaro (yellow card) 50'; Hertzog (yellow card) 58'	Report	R. Lopez (yellow card) 21'; Keinan 51'; Hilliard-Arce (yellow card) 52'; Villarreal (yellow card) 83'; Formella (yellow card) 90+3'	Stadium: Greater Nevada Field; Attendance: 0 Referee: Michael Radchuk

September 30 15	Tacoma Defiance	1–0	Sacramento Republic FC	Tacoma, Washington
7:00 PM PDT	Mueller (yellow card) 66'; Díaz 71', (yellow card) 90+4'	Report	Chavez (yellow card) 42'; Penagos (yellow card) 90'	Stadium: Cheney Stadium; Attendance: 0 Referee: Brandon Stevis

October 3 16	Sacramento Republic FC	4–0	Portland Timbers 2	Sacramento, California
7:30 PM PDT	Formella 2', 4'; Villarreal 9', (yellow card) 42'; Belmar (yellow card) 16'; McCrary (yellow card) 22'; Bijev 25'; Keinan (yellow card) 67'; Barahona (yellow card) 85'; F. López (yellow card) 90'	Report	Hanson (yellow card) 45+4'; Krolicki (yellow card) 45+6'	Stadium: Papa Murphy's Park; Attendance: 0 Referee: Nicholas Marin

==== USL Cup Playoffs ====
October 10 Conf. Quarterfinals	Phoenix Rising FC	1–0 (a.e.t.)	Sacramento Republic FC	Scottsdale, Arizona
6:00 PM PDT	Dadashov (yellow card) 44'; Lambert (yellow card) 109'; Asante 114'	Report	Formella (yellow card) 12'; López (yellow card) 45'; Hilliard-Arce (yellow card) 74'; McCrary (yellow card) 87'; Keinan (yellow card) 90+1'	Stadium: Casino Arizona Field; Attendance: 0 Referee: Elvis Osmanovic

=== U.S. Open Cup ===
As a USL Championship club, Sacramento will enter the competition in the Second Round, to be played April 7–9.

April 8 Second Round	Sacramento Republic FC (USLC) (California)	v	(California) Oakland Roots SC (NISA)	Sacramento, California
7:30 pm PDT				Stadium: Papa Murphy's Park
Note: Match postponed due to the COVID-19 pandemic
