= Nathan Jones =

Nathan Jones may refer to:

== People ==
- Nathan Jones (Australian footballer) (born 1988), Australian rules footballer
- Nathan Jones (wrestler) (born 1969), Australian wrestler and actor
- Nathan Jones (Welsh footballer) (born 1973), Welsh football manager and former player
- Nathan Leigh Jones (born 1981), Australian pop singer, songwriter and pianist
- Nathan Jones, a.k.a. Coldcast, fictional character from DC Comics

== Other uses ==
- "Nathan Jones" (song), a 1971 single by The Supremes, covered in 1988 by Bananarama

== See also ==
- Nate Jones (disambiguation)
- Nathaniel Jones (disambiguation)
