= Nathaniel Jones =

Nathaniel Jones is the name of:

- Nate Jones (boxer) (born 1972), American boxer
- Nathaniel Jones (poet) (1832–1905), Welsh poet and minister
- Nathaniel Jones (representative) (1788–1866), U.S. Representative from New York
- Nathaniel R. Jones (1926–2020), American judge, on the U.S. Sixth Circuit Court of Appeals
- Nate Jones (soccer) (born 2001), American soccer player

== See also ==
- Nathan Jones (disambiguation)
