= Grayson Doody =

American soccer player (born 2002)

Personal information
- Full name: Grayson Patrick Doody
- Date of birth: March 20, 2002 (age 24)
- Place of birth: Hermosa Beach, California, United States
- Height: 1.78 m (5 ft 10 in)
- Position: Defender

Team information
- Current team: Orange County SC
- Number: 2

Youth career
- Sand and Surf SC
- LA Galaxy
- Beach FC

College career
Years	Team	Apps	(Gls)
2020–2023	UCLA Bruins	67	(3)

Senior career*
Years	Team	Apps	(Gls)
2021	Fort Wayne FC	9	(1)
2022	Capital FC	6	(0)
2024	CF Montréal	0	(0)
2024	→ CF Montréal U23 (loan)	2	(0)
2024	→ Las Vegas Lights (loan)	13	(1)
2025–	Orange County SC	12	(1)
- * Club domestic league appearances and goals as of 13:52, 10 November 2026 (UTC)

Grayson Patrick Doody (born March 20, 2002) is an American soccer player who plays for Orange County SC in the USL Championship.

== Early life ==
Doody began playing youth soccer with Sand and Surf SC, before later joining the LA Galaxy Academy. He departed the Galaxy Academy when he was in his freshman year of high school, as he wanted to experience playing high school soccer at Loyola High School, which he was not allowed to do as part of the academy, and helped them reach the Southern Section Division 1 semi-finals in the 2019-20 season. He also joined Beach FC at club level, helping them win the U.S. Club Soccer ENPL National Championship at U17 level in 2019.

== College career ==
In 2020, Doody began attending UCLA, where he played for the men's soccer team. On February 8, 2021, he made his collegiate debut in a match against the San Francisco Dons. He scored his first collegiate goal on February 27 against the Oregon State Beavers. On April 17, 2021, he scored a brace in a 4-3 victory over the California Golden Bears. Over his four years at UCLA, he was named to the UCLA Director’s Honor Roll six times.

== Club career ==
In 2021, Doody played with Fort Wayne FC in USL League Two. In 2022, he played with Capital FC.

Doody was drafted by CF Montréal in the first round (10th overall) in the 2024 MLS SuperDraft. In March 2024, he signed a one-year contract with the club, with options from 2025 through 2027. In July 2024, he was loaned to the Las Vegas Lights of the USL Championship for the remainder of the 2024 season. After the 2024 season, Doody's option was not picked up by CF Montreal, making him a free agent. On January 20, 2025, he signed with Orange County SC.

== Career statistics ==
As of September 21, 2024

Club statistics
Club	Season	League			Playoffs		Domestic Cup		Other		Total	
Club	Season	Division	Apps	Goals	Apps	Goals	Apps	Goals	Apps	Goals	Apps	Goals
Fort Wayne FC	2021	USL League Two	9	1	—		—		—		9	1
Capital FC	2022	USL League Two	6	0	1	0	—		—		7	0
CF Montréal	2024	Major League Soccer	0	0	—		0	0	0	0	4	0
CF Montréal U23 (loan)	2024	Ligue1 Québec	2	0	—		—		0	0	2	0
Las Vegas Lights (loan)	2024	USL Championship	8	0	0	0	0	0	—		2	0
Career total			15	1	0	0	2	0	0	0	17	1
