= Chelís (football manager) =

Mexican association football coach

Personal information
- Full name: José Luis Juan Sánchez Solá
- Date of birth: 31 January 1959 (age 67)
- Place of birth: Puebla, Mexico
- Height: 1.86 m (6 ft 1 in)

Managerial career
- Years: Team
- 2006–2010: Puebla
- 2010–2011: Estudiantes Tecos
- 2012: Correcaminos UAT
- 2013: Chivas USA
- 2014: Veracruz
- 2014: Puebla
- 2016–2017: Venados
- 2017–2018: Las Vegas Lights
- 2019: Puebla

José Luis Juan Sánchez Solá (born 31 January 1959), commonly referred to as "Chelís", is a Mexican former football manager and current analyst for ESPN Deportes.

== Managerial career ==
=== Puebla ===
Chelís became the manager of Puebla in 2006, but was sacked twice during his tenure, only to be brought back after the players requested he be reinstated. During his time at Puebla, Chelís gained tremendous popularity in Mexican football, having saved the team from being relegated to the Primera A and being successful with a "small club".

"Chelís" was publicly supported by the players, front office, and the government of the state led by Mario Marín, since they believed he was the main reason why Puebla, after over 15 years, had a competitive team again. Chelís led Puebla during their highly-successful Clausura 2009 campaign rub. After finishing fifth in the general table, the team eliminated Monterrey in the quarter-finals, but was eliminated in the semi-finals by UNAM.

=== Estudiantes Tecos ===
After a meeting to finalize details, Chelís was introduced on November 14, 2010 as the new coach of Estudiantes Tecos. Coupled with this, he acknowledged offers that he had previously received, particularly mentioning the names of Club Atlas, Irapuato FC, and Tiburones Rojos de Veracruz.

=== Chivas USA ===
On December 8, 2012 he was appointed Chivas USA manager. On May 29, 2013 he was fired as Chivas USA manager.

=== Las Vegas Lights ===
On November 13, 2017 he was announced as the first manager of the Las Vegas Lights. On March 15, 2018, he was promoted to Technical Director, while assistant coach Isidro Sánchez was named Head Coach. His tenure was marred by two suspensions totaling twelve games and lighting a cigarette in the stands following a referee sending him off the pitch. He left the team on September 18, 2018.

=== Return to Puebla ===
In February 2019 it was announced that Chelis would return for the fourth time to Puebla.

== Controversy ==
A few days after the playoff match against Club Universidad in 2009, Chelís appeared in a political ad by the Partido Revolucionario Institucional (P.R.I.), the political party of Puebla's governor at the time Mario Marín. This resulted in criticism from some Mexican sports commentators and others who disagreed with sports figures getting involved in political campaigns.

== Personal life ==
Chelís is the father of fellow coach Isidro Sánchez.

== Career statistics ==
From 2006 to 2007 he coached in Primera A, and in 2007 he promoted the club to the Primera División de México.

| Year | Club | Position | Games managed | Won | Tied | Lost | Points | Postseason place |
|---|---|---|---|---|---|---|---|---|
| Apertura 2006 | Puebla FC | 1 | 17 | 1 | 3 | 22 | 3 | Didn't qualify |
| Clausura 2007 | Puebla FC | 2 | 17 | 11 | 3 | 3 | 36 | Semifinals |
| Apertura 2007 | Puebla FC | 14 | 17 | 4 | 5 | 8 | 17 | Didn't qualify |
| Clausura 2008 | Puebla FC | 11 | 17 | 5 | 6 | 6 | 7 | Didn't qualify |
| Apertura 2008 | Puebla FC | 18 | 8 | 1 | 4 | 3 | 7 | Didn't qualify |
| Clausura 2009 | Puebla FC | 5 | 21 | 7 | 5 | 5 | 26 | Semifinals |
| Apertura 2009 | Puebla FC | 7 | 19 | 6 | 8 | 3 | 26 | Quarterfinals |

As of January 14, 2013

| Team | From | To | Record^{1} | | | | | GF | GA | GD |
| Team | From | To | G | W | L | T | Win % | GF | GA | GD |
|---|---|---|---|---|---|---|---|---|---|---|
| Chivas USA | December 8, 2012 | | 5 | 3 | 1 | 1 | 60.00 | 10 | 7 | +3 |
| Total | | | 5 | 3 | 1 | 1 | 60.00 | 10 | 7 | +3 |

- 1.Includes league, playoffs, cup and CONCACAF Champions League.
