= Stefan Stojanovic (soccer, born 2001) =

American soccer player (born 2001)

Personal information
- Date of birth: March 3, 2001 (age 25)
- Place of birth: Chicago, Illinois, United States
- Height: 1.83 m (6 ft 0 in)
- Position: Forward

Team information
- Current team: Brooklyn FC
- Number: 19

Youth career
- Sockers FC Chicago

College career
Years	Team	Apps	(Gls)
2019–2021	Saint Louis Billikens	29	(1)
2021	Georgetown Hoyas	22	(9)

Senior career*
Years	Team	Apps	(Gls)
2021	Chicago FC United	2	(0)
2022–2023	Philadelphia Union II	43	(11)
2024–2025	FC Tulsa	40	(5)
2025	Las Vegas Lights	17	(2)
2026–	Brooklyn FC	26	(4)

International career^{‡}
2018	United States U18	1	(1)
2020	United States U20	2	(0)
- * Club domestic league appearances and goals as of November 4, 2026 ‡ National team caps and goals as of January 18, 2020

Stefan Stojanovic (born March 3, 2001) is an American professional soccer player that plays for USL Championship club Brooklyn FC.

== Early life ==
Stojanovic played youth soccer with Sockers FC Chicago.

== College career ==
In April 2019, he committed to attend Saint Louis University, where he would play for the men's soccer team. On February 3, 2021, he scored his first collegiate goal in the delayed 2020 season opener against Kansas City Roos.

In July 2021, he transferred to Georgetown University, joining the men's soccer team for his junior season. On August 29, he scored his first goal for Georgetown in a 4–0 victory over the Fordham Rams. On October 2, he scored a brace against the DePaul Blue Demons, which earned him Big East Offensive Player of the Week honors. Later in the month, he was named to the Big East Honor Roll. On November 14, he scored another brace, including scoring the overtime winning goal in a 2–1 victory over the Providence Friars, which won the Big East Tournament title for Georgetown. He was named to the Big East All-Tournament Team and named the Most Outstanding Offensive Player of the tournament. After the season, he was named to the All-Big East Second Team. He departed Georgetown after the 2021 season to begin his professional career.

== Club career ==
In 2021, he played with Chicago FC United in USL League Two.

In March 2022, Stojanovic signed a professional contract with Philadelphia Union II in MLS Next Pro. On July 31, 2022, he scored his first professional goal, netting the game winner in a 2–1 victory over Columbus Crew 2.

In December 2022, he was selected in the second round (57th overall) of the 2023 MLS SuperDraft by the Philadelphia Union. Despite having played for the Union II in 2022, the Union did not hold his MLS rights, as he was not an academy graduate, which necessitated his drafting to secure his MLS rights. He continued to play for the second team in 2023. On July 25, 2023, he scored a brace against Columbus Crew 2, which earned him MLS NEXT Pro Player of Matchday honors. He departed the club after the 2023 season, upon the expiry of his contract.

In February 2024, he signed with FC Tulsa of the USL Championship. After the season, he re-signed for the 2025 season.

In June 2025, he moved to the Las Vegas Lights on a permanent transfer. He was released by Las Vegas following their 2025 season.

== International career ==
Stojanovic was a member of the United States U18 national team program. In February 2018, he scored in a friendly against Costa Rica U18. In January 2020, Stojanovic was named to a United States U20 camp.

== Career statistics ==
As of June 11, 2025

Club	Season	League			Playoffs		National Cup		Continental		Total	
Club	Season	Division	Apps	Goals	Apps	Goals	Apps	Goals	Apps	Goals	Apps	Goals
Chicago FC United	2021	USL League Two	2	0	0	0	–		–		2	0
Philadelphia Union II	2022	MLS Next Pro	15	1	1	0	–		–		16	1
Philadelphia Union II	2023	MLS Next Pro	28	10	1	0	–		–		29	10
Philadelphia Union II	Total		43	11	2	0	0	0	0	0	45	11
FC Tulsa	2024	USL Championship	34	5	–		3	0	–		37	5
FC Tulsa	2025	USL Championship	6	0	0	0	3	0	–		9	0
FC Tulsa	Total		40	5	0	0	6	0	0	0	46	5
Career total			85	16	2	0	6	0	0	0	93	16
