= Patrick Leal =

American soccer player (born 2003)

Personal information
- Full name: Patrick Thomas Leal
- Date of birth: February 21, 2003 (age 23)
- Place of birth: Newton, Massachusetts, United States
- Height: 6 ft 1 in (1.85 m)
- Position: Midfielder

Team information
- Current team: Las Vegas Lights
- Number: 17

Youth career
- 2016−2017: New England Revolution
- 2017−2018: Belenenses SAD
- 2018−2021: Sporting CP
- 2021−2023: Venezia

Senior career*
Years	Team	Apps	(Gls)
2022−2023	Venezia	1	(0)
2023–2024	New England Revolution II	32	(4)
2025–	Las Vegas Lights	40	(3)
- * Club domestic league appearances and goals as of 10:20, 9 November 2026 (UTC)

Patrick Thomas Leal (born February 21, 2003) is an American professional soccer player who plays as a midfielder for Las Vegas Lights FC in the USL Championship.

== Club career ==
He spent one year with the New England Revolution youth academy. He has secured 7 goals in 25 appearances for the New England Revolution's under-14 team during the 2016–17 season. Leal was with Belenenses SAD for a year before signing with Sporting in October 2018.

In September 2019, Patrick signed a five-year professional contract with Sporting. He trained mainly with Sporting's youth teams. He assisted twice in Sporting under-17's 4–0 victory over Caldas. He holds a European Union passport, making him eligible to play for any European team. He currently plays for Venezia F.C. in Italy. Patrick earned a call-up to the United States under-14 team in 2017.

With Venezia's academy club, Leal scored 4 goals and six assists in 27 appearances. He would make his first team debut with Venezia in Serie A on May 22, 2022, coming on as a 25th-minute substitute for Dor Peretz in a 0–0 draw with Cagliari Calcio.

Leal signed for New England Revolution II on August 4, 2023.

In January 2025, Leal signed with USL Championship club Las Vegas Lights on a one-year contract with a club option for an additional year.

== International career ==
Leal has represented the United States at the U14 level.

== Personal life ==
He is originally from Newton, Massachusetts. Patrick resides in Mattapoisett, Massachusetts. His twin brother, Matthew Leal, is also a soccer player who plays for Athlone Town in Ireland. He is of Portuguese descent through his father, and holds dual citizenship.
