= Isidro Sánchez (soccer, born 1987) =

Canadian-Mexican former soccer player (born 1987)

Personal information
- Full name: Isidro Sánchez Macip
- Date of birth: June 5, 1987 (age 39)
- Place of birth: Puebla, Mexico
- Height: 1.70 m (5 ft 7 in)
- Position: Midfielder

Team information
- Current team: Pachuca (assistant)

Youth career
- 1998–2007: Puebla

Senior career*
Years	Team	Apps	(Gls)
2007–2010	Puebla	5	(0)

International career
2008	Canada U23	1	(0)

Managerial career
- 2013: Chivas USA (assistant)
- 2014: Veracruz (assistant)
- 2014: Puebla (assistant)
- 2015: Real Cuautitlán
- 2016–2017: Venados de Yucatán (assistant)
- 2018: Las Vegas Lights
- 2018–2019: Tlaxcala
- 2019: Puebla (methodology)
- 2020: Miraflor (assistant)
- 2022: Proas
- 2023: Las Vegas Lights
- 2024: West Santos FC (seven-a-side)
- 2024: York United (assistant)
- 2026–: Pachuca (assistant)
- * Club domestic league appearances and goals

Isidro Sánchez Macip (born June 5, 1987) is a professional soccer coach and former player. Born in Mexico, he represented Canada at youth international level.

== Early life ==
Sánchez joined the youth system of Puebla at age 11.

== Club career ==
In 2007, he debuted for the Puebla first team, where his father was head coach. He left Puebla in 2010 after being separated from the squad by club owner Ricardo Henaine and was not being allowed to travel with the team, following the resignation of his father from the club over a disagreement with Henaine, and he subsequently officially retired 2011.

== International career ==
Born in Mexico, Sánchez was eligible for Canadian citizenship through his grandfather and mother who lived in Canada for a period and gained citizenship.

Seeking to participate in the 2007 FIFA U20 World Cup, Sánchez contacted the Canadian Soccer Association pretending to be an agent recommending himself for a trial, after feeling he would not get selected for the Mexico team. They responded and he was invited to a camp with the Canada U20 team in January 2020, but ultimately was not selected to the roster for the tournament. The following year, he was called up to the Canada U23 for the 2008 Olympic qualifying tournament. He made his debut in the 3rd place match against Guatemala, scoring in the penalty shootout to help the team to a 3rd-place finish.

== Coaching career ==
In December 2012, it was announced that he would join Major League Soccer club Chivas USA as an assistant coach for the 2013 season, where his father Chelís was the head coach.

In 2014, he joined Liga MX side Veracruz as an assistant coach, where his father was again serving as head coach.

In August 2014, he moved with his father to Puebla, again serving as an assistant.

In 2015, he was named as head coach of Real Cuautitlán in the Mexican third tier Liga Premier de Ascenso. However, the following season, he was dismissed as coach after the first few matches of the season.

In August 2016, he joined Venados de Yucatán as an assistant, again on the coaching staff under his father.

In November 2017, he again followed his father to the Las Vegas Lights in the United States second tier USL Championship to become assistant coach. On March 14, 2018, after the end of pre-season but before the opening match of the season, he was promoted to head coach (with his father being promoted to Technical Director). At the end of the season in October 2018, he was fired by the club.

In November 2018, he was named head coach of Tlaxcala in the third tier Liga Premier de México.

In May 2019, he returned to Puebla to work in the football methodology department, rather than as an assistant coach (his father once again was the head coach of Puebla).

In 2020, he became an assistant with Spanish club Miraflor while completing coaching licenses in Spain.

In 2022, he became coach of Proas in the Spanish sixth tier. During this time, his father asked to become his assistant (a reversal of their usual roles), but Sánchez rejected his father's request.

In January 2023, he was once again named the head coach of USL Championship club Las Vegas Lights.

In March 2024, he was named the head coach of West Santos FC in the seven-a-side football Américas Kings League.

In August 2024, he joined Canadian Premier League club York United FC as an assistant coach.

== Personal life ==
Sánchez is the son of Mexican coach and analyst Chelís.
