= Nicholas Ammeter =

Swiss footballer (born 2000)

Personal information
- Date of birth: 11 December 2000 (age 25)
- Place of birth: New York City, U.S.
- Height: 1.85 m (6 ft 1 in)
- Position: Goalkeeper

Youth career
- Aarau

Senior career*
Years	Team	Apps	(Gls)
2018	Aarau II	2	(0)
2018–2022	Aarau	38	(0)
2018–2019	→ Baden (loan)	26	(0)
2021	→ Young Boys (loan)	1	(0)
2021	→ Young Boys II (loan)	2	(0)
2022–2024	Wil	30	(0)
2022	Wil II	1	(0)
2024–2026	Las Vegas Lights	12	(0)

International career^{‡}
2015–2016	Switzerland U16	3	(0)
2017	Switzerland U17	1	(0)
2019	Switzerland U20	1	(0)
- * Club domestic league appearances and goals as of 28 October 2025 ‡ National team caps and goals as of 5 September 2019

Nicholas Ammeter (born 11 December 2000) is a footballer who plays as a goalkeeper. Born in the United States, he represents Switzerland at youth level.

== Club career ==
Ammeter started his career with Swiss second-tier side Aarau. In 2018, he was sent on loan to FC Baden in the Swiss third tier. In 2021, Ammeter was sent on loan to Swiss top flight club YB, where he made 1 league appearances and scored 0 goals. On 12 December 2021, he debuted for YB during a 4–3 win over Sion.

On 10 June 2022, Ammeter signed a two-year contract with Wil.

On 22 February 2024, Ammeter signed on with second-tier American side Las Vegas Lights of the USL Championship.

== International career ==
Ammeter is eligible to represent the United States internationally, having been born there.
