= Gennaro Nigro =

American soccer player (born 2000)

Personal information
- Full name: Gennaro Michael Nigro
- Date of birth: May 29, 2000 (age 26)
- Place of birth: Livingston, New Jersey, United States
- Height: 1.78 m (5 ft 10 in)
- Position: Midfielder

Team information
- Current team: Tampa Bay Rowdies
- Number: 22

Senior career*
Years	Team	Apps	(Gls)
2018–2020	Manchester City	0	(0)
2020–2022	Rochdale	25	(0)
2022–2023	LA Galaxy II	17	(0)
2023	→ ADO Den Haag (loan)	0	(0)
2024–2025	Las Vegas Lights	60	(0)
2026–	Tampa Bay Rowdies	6	(0)
- * Club domestic league appearances and goals as of 17:58, 8 November 2026 (UTC)

Gennaro Michael Nigro (born May 29, 2000) is an American soccer player who plays as a midfielder for Tampa Bay Rowdies.

Raised in Clark, New Jersey, Nigro played prep soccer for Arthur L. Johnson High School.

== Career ==
In 2018, Nigro signed for English Premier League side Manchester City from the Players Development Academy in the United States. He had previously committed to Cornell University.

In 2020, he moved to English 4th division club Rochdale.

On September 1, 2023, Nigro joined ADO Den Haag in the Netherlands on loan. Nigro made only one appearance in the Dutch Cup for ADO and no league appearances, and on January 2, 2024, the loan was terminated.
