= Hayden Sargis =

American soccer player (born 2002)

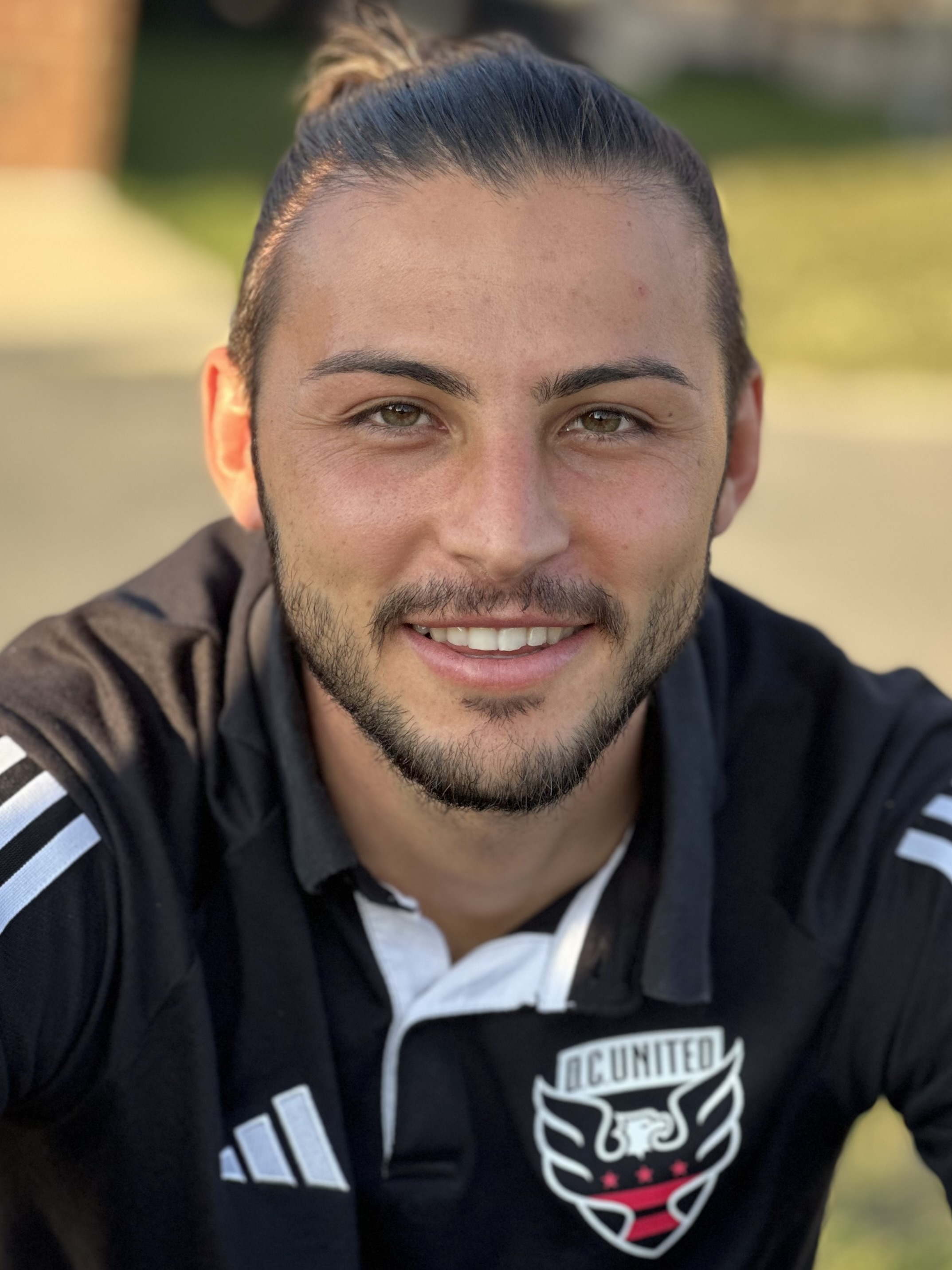
- Sargis with D.C. United in 2024

Personal information
- Full name: Hayden Sargis
- Date of birth: May 2, 2002 (age 24)
- Place of birth: Turlock, California, U.S.
- Height: 6 ft 1 in (1.85 m)
- Position: Defender

Team information
- Current team: Real Monarchs (on loan from Athletic Club Boise)
- Number: 84

Youth career
- 2015–2020: Sacramento Republic

Senior career*
Years	Team	Apps	(Gls)
2020–2021	Sacramento Republic	33	(0)
2022–2024	D.C. United	3	(0)
2022–2023	→ Loudoun United (loan)	21	(0)
2022	→ Phoenix Rising (loan)	7	(0)
2024	→ Las Vegas Lights (loan)	8	(0)
2025	Orlando City B	24	(1)
2026–	Athletic Club Boise	6	(0)
2026–	→ Real Monarchs (loan)	6	(0)
- * Club domestic league appearances and goals as of 14:30, October 29, 2026 (UTC)

Hayden Sargis (born May 2, 2002) is an American professional soccer player who plays as a defender for MLS Next Pro club Real Monarchs, on loan from USL League One club Athletic Club Boise.

== Early career ==
Sargis was born in Turlock, California. Sargis began his career as part of the Sacramento Republic youth academy in 2015. While with the academy, Sargis also spent time training at the Barcelona US-based academy in Arizona. He then made his first appearance on the bench for the Sacramento Republic first team on August 7, 2019, against Las Vegas Lights.

== Club career ==
=== Sacramento Republic ===
On January 15, 2020, it was announced that Sargis, alongside academy teammate Mario Penagos, had signed a professional contract with the Sacramento Republic in the USL Championship. He then made his competitive debut for the club on March 7 against FC Tulsa. He started and played the entire match as Sacramento Republic drew 1–1.

=== D.C. United ===
On January 24, 2022, Sargis signed with Major League Soccer club D.C. United on a three-year deal through 2024 with options in 2025 and 2026. Sargis made his D.C. United debut on April 19, 2022, in a 3–0 victory against Flower City Union in the U.S. Open Cup.

Sargis began the 2022 season on loan to D.C. United's reserve squad, Loudoun United FC, where he made his debut on March 13, 2022. On September 8, Sargis joined USL Championship club Phoenix Rising FC on loan for the remainder of the 2022 season. D.C. United declined his contract option following their 2024 season.

=== Orlando City B ===
On March 9, 2025, Sargis signed a one-year contract with a club option for 2026 with MLS Next Pro club Orlando City B, the reserve affiliate of Major League Soccer club Orlando City. On June 6, Sargis scored his first professional goal and first goal for the club when he opened the scoring in a 3–2 win at Huntsville City. On October 28, after the conclusion of the season, Orlando City B chose not to extend Sargis' contract.

=== Athletic Club Boise ===
On March 4, 2026, USL League One club Athletic Club Boise announced that they had signed Sargis. Four days later, Sargis made his debut for the team as an 86th-minute substitute for Jonathan Ricketts in a 1–0 win at Sarasota Paradise. On August 23, Sargis joined MLS Next Pro club Real Monarchs on loan for the remainder of the season.

== Career statistics ==
=== Club ===
As of match played September 20, 2026

Appearances and goals by club, season and competition
Club	Season	League			U.S. Open Cup		Other		Total	
Club	Season	Division	Apps	Goals	Apps	Goals	Apps	Goals	Apps	Goals
Sacramento Republic	2020	USL Championship	15	0	—		—		15	0
Sacramento Republic	2021	USL Championship	18	0	—		—		18	0
Sacramento Republic	Total		33	0	—		0	0	33	0
D.C. United	2022	Major League Soccer	0	0	2	0	—		2	0
D.C. United	2023	Major League Soccer	2	0	2	0	—		4	0
D.C. United	2024	Major League Soccer	1	0	—		—		1	0
D.C. United	Total		3	0	4	0	0	0	7	0
Phoenix Rising (loan)	2022	USL Championship	7	0	—		—		7	0
Loudoun United (loan)	2022	USL Championship	18	0	—		—		18	0
Loudoun United (loan)	2023	USL Championship	3	0	—		—		3	0
Loudoun United (loan)	Total		21	0	—		0	0	21	0
Las Vegas Lights (loan)	2024	USL Championship	8	0	1	0	—		9	0
Orlando City B	2025	MLS Next Pro	24	1	—		—		24	1
Athletic Club Boise	2026	USL League One	6	0	0	0	2 (Note: Appearances in USL Cup)	0	8	0
Real Monarchs (loan)	2026	MLS Next Pro	6	0	—		—		6	0
Career total			108	1	5	0	2	0	115	1
