= Nate Jones (soccer) =

American soccer player (born 2001)

Personal information
- Full name: Nathaniel Jones
- Date of birth: August 23, 2001 (age 25)
- Place of birth: Seattle, Washington, U.S.
- Height: 6 ft 3 in (1.91 m)
- Position: Defender

Team information
- Current team: Las Vegas Lights
- Number: 3

Youth career
- Harbor Premier
- Washington Premier
- Crossfire Premier

College career
Years	Team	Apps	(Gls)
2020–2023	Washington Huskies	58	(5)

Senior career*
Years	Team	Apps	(Gls)
2022	Crossfire Redmond		
2023	Vermont Green	9	(0)
2024–2025	Colorado Rapids	0	(0)
2024	→ Colorado Rapids 2 (loan)	25	(0)
2025	→ Las Vegas Lights (loan)	17	(0)
2026–	Las Vegas Lights	24	(0)
- * Club domestic league appearances and goals as of 10:17, 9 November 2026 (UTC)

Nathaniel Jones (born August 23, 2001) is an American professional soccer player who plays as a defender for Las Vegas Lights of the USL Championship.

== Early life ==
Jones began playing youth soccer in local Gig Harbor leagues in his hometown, before joining the Harbor Premier and later Washington Premier FC.

Jones attended Gig Harbor High School, where he earned All-League, All-County and All-State honors, while playing for the soccer team.

== College career ==
In August 2019, he committed to attend the University of Washington to play for the men's soccer team in the fall of 2020. He made his collegiate debut on February 4, 2021 against the Northwest Eagles and made his first start on March 20, 2021 against the Stanford Cardinal. On October 21, 2022, he scored his first collegiate goal against the Oregon State Beavers. In his junior season, he helped the team win the Pac 12 title and at the end of his junior season, he was named to the All-Pac-12 Second Team. Ahead of his senior season, he was named to the All-Pac 12 Preseason Team, and at the end of the season, he was selected to the All-Pac-12 First Team. After the season, he was invited to attend the MLS College Showcase.

== Club career ==
In 2022, he played with the Crossfire Redmond in the National Premier Soccer League.

In 2023, he played with Vermont Green FC in USL League Two, appearing in nine matches.

At the 2024 MLS SuperDraft, he was selected in the first round (fifth overall) by Austin FC. However, his rights were immediately traded to the Colorado Rapids in exchange for $250,000 in General Allocation Money. In January 2024, he signed a professional contract with the Rapids. Training with the first team, he spent most of the season playing with the second team, Colorado Rapids 2, in MLS Next Pro. He made his professional debut on March 17 with Rapids 2, against St. Louis City 2. In January 2025, Jones was loaned to USL Championship club Las Vegas Lights for the 2025 season. He made his debut for Las Vegas on March 8 against the Tampa Bay Rowdies. On November 26, the Colorado Rapids announced that they had declined his contract option.

On December 23, 2025, Las Vegas Lights announced they had signed Jones for the 2026 USL Championship season with a club option for 2027.

== Career statistics ==
As of match played October 12, 2025

Appearances and goals by club, season and competition
Club	Season	League			Playoffs		National cup		Other		Total	
Club	Season	Division	Apps	Goals	Apps	Goals	Apps	Goals	Apps	Goals	Apps	Goals
Vermont Green FC	2023	USL League Two	9	0	—		–		–		9	0
Colorado Rapids	2024	Major League Soccer	0	0	0	0	–		0	0	0	0
Colorado Rapids 2 (loan)	2024	MLS Next Pro	25	0	–		1	0	–		26	0
Las Vegas Lights FC (loan)	2025	USL Championship	17	0	–		0	0	2	0	19	0
Career total			51	0	0	0	1	0	2	0	54	0
