= Khori Bennett =

Jamaican footballer (born 1997)

Personal information
- Full name: Khori O' Neil Bennett
- Date of birth: 13 December 1997 (age 28)
- Place of birth: Kingston, Jamaica
- Height: 1.81 m (5 ft 11 in)
- Position: Forward

Team information
- Current team: Colorado Springs Switchbacks
- Number: 90

Youth career
- Harbour View
- Real Mona

College career
Years	Team	Apps	(Gls)
2015–2017	Northeastern Huskies	44	(5)
2018	Radford Highlanders	15	(3)

Senior career*
Years	Team	Apps	(Gls)
2016–2019	Reading United	25	(11)
2019	Philadelphia Fury	1	(0)
2021	CA Cabezo De Torres		
2022–2023	Charlotte Independence	62	(17)
2024–2025	Las Vegas Lights	33	(14)
2025	Al-Nasr	8	(1)
2025	Sacramento Republic	13	(5)
2026–	Colorado Springs Switchbacks	29	(15)

International career^{‡}
2026–	Jamaica	1	(0)
- * Club domestic league appearances and goals as of 19:55, 8 November 2026 (UTC) ‡ National team caps and goals as of 3:50, 16 November 2026 (UTC)

Khori O' Neil Bennett (born 13 December 1997) is a Jamaican professional footballer who plays as a forward for Colorado Springs Switchbacks and the Jamaica national team.

== Early life ==
Bennett was born in Kingston, Jamaica and attended Wolmer's Boys School. With the Under-19 team in 2014, he scored 11 goals in nine games after winning back-to-back Under-19 knockout competition championships, back to back all island Under-16 championships, and one Under-14 all-island championship. Bennett won the O.G Brown Prize for Good Sportsmanship in 2014, led his team in scoring for three straight seasons from 2012 to 2014, and was named Team MVP in 2011 and 2013. He also played at youth level with both Harbour View and Real Mona.

== College career ==
In 2015, Bennett moved to the United States to play college soccer at Northeastern University. In three seasons with the Huskies, Bennett made 44 appearances, scoring five goals and tallying three assists. For his senior year, Bennett transferred to Radford University, where he played a single season, scoring three goals in 15 appearances.

While at college, Bennett played in the USL PDL with Reading United AC. In four seasons at Reading, Bennett scored 11 regular season goals in 24 appearances. Including his goals in the playoffs and Lamar Hunt U.S. Open Cup, Bennett became Reading's all-time leading goalscorer.

== Club career ==
=== Philadelphia Fury ===
In 2019, Bennett signed with NISA side Philadelphia Fury, playing a single game for the team before the club had to withdraw from the 2019 season and fold.

=== Cabezo de Torres ===
In late 2021, Bennett spent time with sixth-tier Spanish side CA Cabezo De Torres.

=== Charlotte Independence ===
In April 2022, after trialing with the club in preseason, Bennett signed with USL League One club Charlotte Independence. He made his debut for the club on 16 April 2022, starting in a 2–1 win over Northern Colorado Hailstorm. On August 1, 2022, Bennett was named USL League One Player of the Week for Week 18 of the 2022 season after scoring his first hat-trick against Central Valley Fuego FC.

=== Las Vegas Lights ===
On 5 March 2024, Bennett joined USL Championship club Las Vegas Lights.

=== Al-Nasr ===
On 14 January 2025, Las Vegas transferred Bennett to Kuwaiti club Al-Nasr for a club-record transfer fee.

=== Sacramento Republic ===
On July 17, 2025, Bennett returned to the United States, joining USL Championship side Sacramento Republic FC.

=== Colorado Springs Switchbacks ===
On January 14, 2026, Bennett signed a two-year deal with USL Championship side Colorado Springs Switchbacks.

== International career ==
On 18 November 2024, Bennett was called up to the senior Jamaica national football team for the first time, ahead of the team's match that night against the United States in the CONCACAF Nations League.
