= Edison Azcona =

Dominican footballer (born 2003)

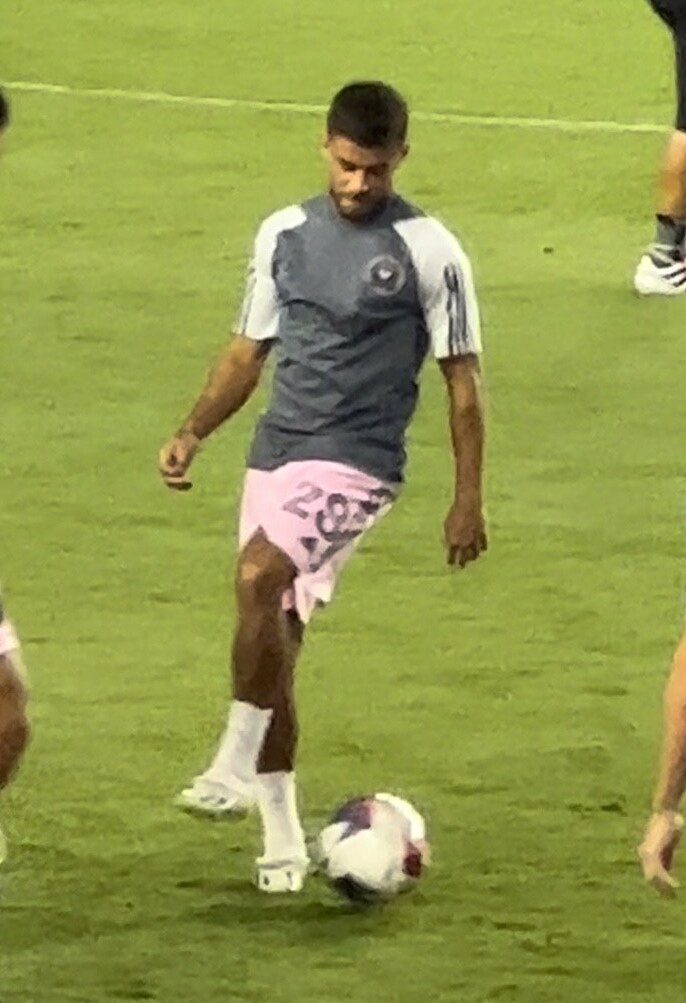
- Azcona training with Inter Miami in 2023

Personal information
- Full name: Edison Alexander Azcona Vélez
- Date of birth: 21 November 2003 (age 22)
- Place of birth: La Romana, Dominican Republic
- Height: 1.68 m (5 ft 6 in)
- Position: Midfielder

Team information
- Current team: Las Vegas Lights
- Number: 10

Youth career
- 2017–2018: Boca United FC
- 2018–2019: Orlando City
- 2019–2020: Inter Miami

Senior career*
Years	Team	Apps	(Gls)
2020–2024	Inter Miami II	39	(7)
2021–2024	Inter Miami	10	(0)
2022	→ El Paso Locomotive (loan)	5	(0)
2024	→ Las Vegas Lights (loan)	13	(0)
2024–	Las Vegas Lights	18	(0)

International career^{‡}
2021–2023	Dominican Republic U20	10	(5)
2021–	Dominican Republic U23	3	(1)
2024	Dominican Republic Olympic	3	(0)
2021–	Dominican Republic	18	(1)
- * Club domestic league appearances and goals as of 10:19, 9 November 2026 (UTC) ‡ National team caps and goals as of 29 March 2026 (UTC)

Edison Alexander Azcona Vélez (born 21 November 2003) is a Dominican professional footballer who plays as a midfielder for USL Championship club Las Vegas Lights and the Dominican Republic national team.

== Club career ==
=== Fort Lauderdale CF ===
Azcona made his league debut for the club on 18 July 2020 in a 2–0 defeat to the Greenville Triumph. In November, 2020, Azcona was named to the USL League One All-League Second Team and was nominated for the USL League One Young Player of the Year award. He scored three goals during his first season with the club, the second of which (a fifth-minute opener against Orlando City B) finished runner-up in the USL League One Fans' Choice Goal of the Year vote.

=== Inter Miami ===
On 26 January 2021, Inter Miami announced Azcona's signing as a homegrown player. On 2 May 2021, Azcona made his MLS debut against Nashville SC and became the first Inter Miami homegrown player to appear in an MLS match.

In 2023, Inter Miami won the 2023 Leagues Cup, with Azcona being part of the squad as a substitute.

==== El Paso Locomotive (loan) ====
In July 2022, Azcona was loaned to USL Championship club El Paso Locomotive FC for the remainder of the 2022 season.

==== Las Vegas Lights (loan) ====
On 19 February 2024, Azcona joined USL Championship side Las Vegas Lights for their 2024 season, with Las Vegas holding the option to make the deal permanent on 1 July 2024. The deal was made permanent on 9 July 2024.

=== Las Vegas Lights ===
On 9 July 2024, Las Vegas exercised their purchase option on Azcona's loan agreement. The permanent transfer was the largest transaction fee in the club's history.

== International career ==
On 28 October 2020, Azcona was called up by the senior Dominican Republic national football team. He made his international debut on 19 January 2021, as a starter in a 0–1 home friendly loss to Puerto Rico. On 25 January 2021, Azcona also started in the 0–0 home friendly against Serbia.

In March 2021, Azcona was named to the Dominican Republic squad for the 2020 CONCACAF Men's Olympic Qualifying Championship. He scored the only goal of the tournament for his country as they bowed out in the group stage.

In November 2021, he was named to the U-20 side for the 2022 CONCACAF U-20 Championship qualifying tournament in Santo Domingo. In the opening match of the tournament, Azcona scored the final goal in a 6–0 victory over Anguilla. In the final match against Saint Lucia, Azcona scored the goal that gave the Dominican Republic a 2–2 draw with Saint Lucia and a spot in next year's 2022 Concacaf Men's Under-20 Championship. Azcona's decisive goal in the 90+4 minute, allowed the Dominican Republic to accumulate 10 points and finish as Group B's leader, giving the host country the ticket to the next round.

In 2023, Azcona got called up for the 2023–24 CONCACAF Nations League, against Nicaragua and Montserrat.

He scored his first goal for the Dominican Republic during the 2025 CONCACAF Gold Cup on 14 June 2025 during the 3–2 loss against Mexico.

=== International goals ===
Scores and results list Dominican Republic’s goal tally first.

No	Date	Venue	Opponent	Score	Result	Competition
1.	14 June 2025	SoFi Stadium, Inglewood, USA	Mexico	2–3	2–3	2025 CONCACAF Gold Cup

== Personal ==
Born in the Dominican Republic, Azcona moved to the United States with his family the day before his fourth birthday, originally going to Tennessee before the family settled in Florida when Edison was eight. He has a black belt in taekwondo.
