= Shawn Smart =

American soccer player (born 2004)

Personal information
- Full name: Shawn Smart
- Date of birth: February 24, 2004 (age 22)
- Place of birth: Apopka, Florida, United States
- Height: 1.73 m (5 ft 8 in)
- Position: Defender

Team information
- Current team: Las Vegas Lights
- Number: 20

Youth career
- –2022: SIMA Gold

College career
Years	Team	Apps	(Gls)
2022–2023	Clemson Tigers	36	(2)

Senior career*
Years	Team	Apps	(Gls)
2024–	Las Vegas Lights	54	(4)
- * Club domestic league appearances and goals as of October 31, 2026

Shawn Smart (born February 24, 2004) is an American soccer player who currently plays for Las Vegas Lights in the USL Championship.

== Career ==
=== Youth and college ===
Smart attended the Montverde Academy in Florida, where he was a teammate with Hamady Diop and Ousmane Sylla. In 2022, he attended Clemson University to play college soccer, where he went on to make 36 appearances, scoring two goals and tallying three assists. In 2023, Smart helped the Tigers to win the NCAA Division I College Cup with their victory against the University of Notre Dame, scoring the winning goal.

=== Professional ===
After two years of college soccer, Smart left Clemon to sign his first professional contract, joining USL Championship side Las Vegas Lights on February 26, 2024.

On December 21, 2024, Smart was selected 68th overall in the 2025 MLS SuperDraft by Colorado Rapids. However, he wasn't signed by Colorado and instead signed a two-year contract extension with Las Vegas Lights.

== Honours ==
Clemson University

- NCAA Division I men's soccer tournament: 2023

== Personal ==
Shawn's sister, Shayla, plays college soccer at Wake Forest University.
