= Gerson Echeverry =

American retired soccer forward

Personal information
- Date of birth: August 25, 1971 (age 55)
- Place of birth: Cali, Colombia
- Height: 6 ft 1 in (1.85 m)
- Position: Forward

Youth career
- 1990–1993: Seton Hall Pirates

Senior career*
Years	Team	Apps	(Gls)
1995	Richmond Kickers		
1996	Cortuluá		
1997	MetroStars	1	(0)
1997	→ South Jersey Barons (loan)		
1997	Richmond Kickers	14	(2)
1998	Hershey Wildcats	11	(0)
1998	Central Jersey Riptide		(2)
1998–2000	Maryland Mania	21	(2)
1999	Harrisburg Heat (indoor)	63	(40)

Managerial career
- 2004–2011: Seton Hall Pirates (assistant)
- 2012–2017: Seton Hall Pirates
- 2018–2020: Rio Grande Valley FC
- 2020–2023: Rio Grande Valley FC (assistant)
- 2024-: Las Vegas Lights (assistant)
- * Club domestic league appearances and goals

Gerson Echeverry (born August 25, 1971) is an American retired soccer forward who played professionally in Major League Soccer, USISL and the National Professional Soccer League.

== Player ==
=== Youth ===
Echeverry was born in Cali, Colombia but moved to Paterson, New Jersey in his youth. In 1990, he graduated from John F. Kennedy High School where he had scored 55 goals during his high school soccer career. He played college soccer at Seton Hall University from 1990 to 1993. He was a 1991 Third Team All American.

=== Professional ===
In December 1993, the Buffalo Blizzard selected Echeverry in the fourth round of the National Professional Soccer League draft. He did not sign with the team. In 1995, he played for the Richmond Kickers of the USISL. He then played for Cortuluá in Colombia. On February 2, 1997, D.C. United selected Echevvery in second round (fourteenth overall) of the 1997 MLS Supplemental Draft. United waived him on March 28, 1997, during the pre-season. On April 3, 1997, the MetroStars claimed Echeverry off waivers. He played one game with the MetroStars as well as a handful on loan to the South Jersey Barons. The MetroStars released him on June 4, 1997. Less than two weeks later, he signed with the Richmond Kickers. In 1998, he began the season with the Hershey Wildcats but was released in June. In August, he signed with the Central Jersey Riptide for the remainder of the season. In 1999, he finished his outdoor career with the Maryland Mania. In 1998, Echeverry moved indoors with the Harrisburg Heat of the National Professional Soccer League where he played two seasons.

== Coach ==
In July 2004, Echevery became an assistant coach with the Seton Hall Pirates soccer team. In February 2012, he was named the new head coach. In 2018 he was named head coach of Rio Grande Valley FC, after 3 years the Houston Dynamo FC did not renew his contract. At the beginning of 2021, his good friend and colleague Wilmer Cabrera was named head coach of RGVFC and Cabrera hired Gerson as the club's first assistant coach and director of scouting.

== Coaching statistics ==
As of November 20, 2020

Coaching record by club and tenure
Team	From	To	Record					Ref.
Team	From	To	P	W	D	L	Win %	Ref.
Seton Hall Pirates	September 19, 2012	November 10, 2017	103	28	13	62	27.2	
Rio Grande Valley FC	December 6, 2017	November 6, 2020	80	19	36	25	23.8	
Total			183	47	49	87	25.7	
