= Maliek Howell =

Jamaican footballer (born 1999)

Personal information
- Date of birth: 27 January 1999 (age 27)
- Place of birth: Kingston, Jamaica
- Height: 1.85 m (6 ft 1 in)
- Position: Right-back

Team information
- Current team: New Mexico United

Youth career
- Harbour View

College career
Years	Team	Apps	(Gls)
2018	New Mexico Lobos	0	(0)
2019–2022	Memphis Tigers	34	(1)

Senior career*
Years	Team	Apps	(Gls)
2018	Albuquerque Sol FC	3	(0)
2019	New York Red Bulls U-23	4	(0)
2024–2025	Las Vegas Lights	41	(0)
2025	Birmingham Legion	3	(0)
2026–	New Mexico United	19	(1)

International career^{‡}
2018	Jamaica U20	5	(1)
2019	Jamaica U23	1	(0)
2022–	Jamaica	1	(0)
- * Club domestic league appearances and goals as of 31 October 2026 ‡ National team caps and goals as of 27 January 2022

Maliek Howell (born 27 January 1999) is a Jamaican professional footballer who plays as a right-back for New Mexico United in the USL Championship.

== Early life ==
Howell played for Jamaica College in Kingston, Jamaica. He attended the University of Memphis in Tennessee, United States.

== Club career ==
He has featured for New York Red Bulls U-23 team.

In 2024, Howell joined Las Vegas Lights FC.

On January 14, 2026, New Mexico United announced they had signed Howell to a contract for the 2026 USL Championship season.

== International career ==
Howell has played at the under-20, under-23 and senior level for the Jamaica national football team.

== Career statistics ==
=== Club ===
As of 27 January 2022.

Appearances and goals by club, season and competition
Club	Season	League			Cup		Other		Total	
Club	Season	Division	Apps	Goals	Apps	Goals	Apps	Goals	Apps	Goals
New York Red Bulls U-23	2019	USL League Two	4	0	0	0	0	0	4	0
Career total			4	0	0	0	0	0	4	0

=== International ===
As of match played 27 January 2022.

National team	Year	Apps	Goals
Jamaica	2022	1	0
Total		1	0
