= Riki Alba =

Dominican Republic footballer (born 1995)

Personal information
- Full name: Riki Tomás Alba
- Date of birth: 2 March 1995 (age 31)
- Place of birth: Oslo, Norway
- Height: 1.84 m (6 ft 0 in)
- Positions: Winger; striker

Team information
- Current team: Sandnes Ulf
- Number: 9

Youth career
- Skeid
- Vålerenga

Senior career*
Years	Team	Apps	(Gls)
2012–2016	Vålerenga 2	44	(12)
2014	→ Nest-Sotra (loan)	6	(0)
2015	→ Bærum (loan)	27	(9)
2016	→ Varberg (loan)	6	(0)
2016	→ Ull/Kisa (loan)	10	(2)
2017	Asker	5	(0)
2017	Grorud	9	(2)
2018–2019	Lørenskog	40	(41)
2020–2023	Fredrikstad	105	(32)
2024	Las Vegas Lights	9	(1)
2024–	Sandnes Ulf	7	(0)

International career
2023–	Dominican Republic	5	(2)
- * Club domestic league appearances and goals as of 6 September 2024

Riki Tomás Alba (born 2 March 1995) is a footballer who plays as a winger or striker for Sandnes Ulf. Born in Norway, he is a Dominican Republic international.

== Early life ==
As a youth player, Alba joined the youth academy of Norwegian side Skeid Fotball, where he was described as a "super talent". He joined the youth academy of Norwegian side Vålerenga Fotball at the age of 15.

== Career ==
Before the 2018 season, Alba signed for Norwegian side Lørenskog IF, where he was regarded as one of the club's most important players.

Alba signed with USL Championship side Las Vegas Lights on 16 February 2024.

On 28 August 2024, Alba returned to Norway to play for Sandnes Ulf.

== Style of play ==
Alba has been described as a "lightning winger".

== Personal life ==
Alba is a native of Oslo, Norway.
