= Mario Penagos =

American soccer player

Personal information
- Full name: Mario Penagos
- Date of birth: May 30, 2002 (age 24)
- Place of birth: Elk Grove, California, United States
- Height: 5 ft 8 in (1.73 m)
- Position: Midfielder

Youth career
- 2015–2020: Sacramento Republic

Senior career*
Years	Team	Apps	(Gls)
2020–2023	Sacramento Republic	23	(1)
2022	→ FC Cincinnati 2 (loan)	7	(1)

International career
2018	United States U17	3	(0)
- * Club domestic league appearances and goals as of September 22, 2022

Mario Penagos (born May 30, 2002) is an American professional soccer player who plays as a midfielder.

== Club career ==
Born in Elk Grove, California, Penagos began his career at the Sacramento Republic youth academy in 2015. After impressing in the academy, Penagos was given a call up to the first team and made his first appearance from the bench on September 24, 2018, against OKC Energy.

On January 15, 2020, it was announced that Penagos, alongside academy teammate Hayden Sargis, had signed a professional contract with the Sacramento Republic in the USL Championship. He then made his competitive debut for the club on March 8 against Tulsa. Penagos started and played 68 minutes as the Sacramento Republic drew 1–1. He left Sacramento following their 2023 season.

== International career ==
Penagos made his debut in the United States national team setup at the under-17 level on October 4, 2018, against Argentina.

== Career statistics ==
=== Club ===
As of match played August 15, 2020

Appearances and goals by club, season and competition
Club	Season	League			Cup		Continental		Total	
Club	Season	Division	Apps	Goals	Apps	Goals	Apps	Goals	Apps	Goals
Sacramento Republic	2020	USL Championship	1	0	—	—	—	—	1	0
Career total			1	0	0	0	0	0	1	0
