= Las Vegas Lights FC =

American professional soccer club based in Las Vegas

- Full name: Las Vegas Lights Football Club
- Founded: August 11, 2017; 9 years ago
- Stadium: Cashman Field
- Capacity: 9,334
- Principal owner: José Bautista
- Head coach: Devin Rensing
- League: USL Championship
- 2026: 12th, Western Conference; Playoffs: DNQ
- Website: lasvegaslightsfc.com
Home colors	Away colors

Las Vegas Lights Football Club is an American professional soccer team based in Las Vegas, Nevada, that plays in the USL Championship. The team made its debut in 2018 and plays its home games at Cashman Field.

The club is known for its neon-themed branding on its badge and kits, along with unconventional fan engagement tactics such as llama mascots and casino chips. The Lights are owned by an investment group led by former Major League Baseball player José Bautista.

== History ==
The first professional soccer team to be based in Las Vegas was the Las Vegas Quicksilvers of the North American Soccer League, who moved from San Diego after the 1976 season. The team played at Las Vegas Stadium and had an average attendance of 7,092 during the 1977 season, but moved back to San Diego the following year. The Las Vegas Seagulls of the American Soccer League briefly played at Las Vegas Stadium (by then the Las Vegas Silver Bowl) in 1979, but were terminated by the league after their first season due to financial issues. The city also played host to the 1994 FIFA World Cup draw in December 1993 and was considered several times for a Major League Soccer (MLS) franchise, but was passed over by the league.

The city hosted several exhibition matches between club and national soccer teams during the early 2010s, including a 2012 World Football Challenge match between Real Madrid and Santos Laguna that drew a state-record attendance of 29,152 spectators. An MLS expansion bid was explored in 2014, led by Findlay Sports and Entertainment and the Cordish Company, proposing a 24,000-seat stadium at Symphony Park in Downtown Las Vegas. The Las Vegas bid was rejected for further consideration by MLS in February 2015, putting an end to plans for the publicly financed downtown stadium. Despite an attempted revival, the city declined to submit a proposal in time for the league's deadline for expansion bids in February 2017.

In April 2017, Brett Lashbrook submitted a formal proposal to the Las Vegas City Manager to use Cashman Field as the venue of a USL expansion team that would begin play in 2018. The Las Vegas City Council approved the Cashman Field lease in July, and the USL began planning for a formal announcement in mid-August. On August 11, 2017, Las Vegas was formally announced as a USL expansion team that would join the league in 2018. The team unveiled its official name, Las Vegas Lights FC, on August 29 and its official crest in late October.

=== Inaugural season ===
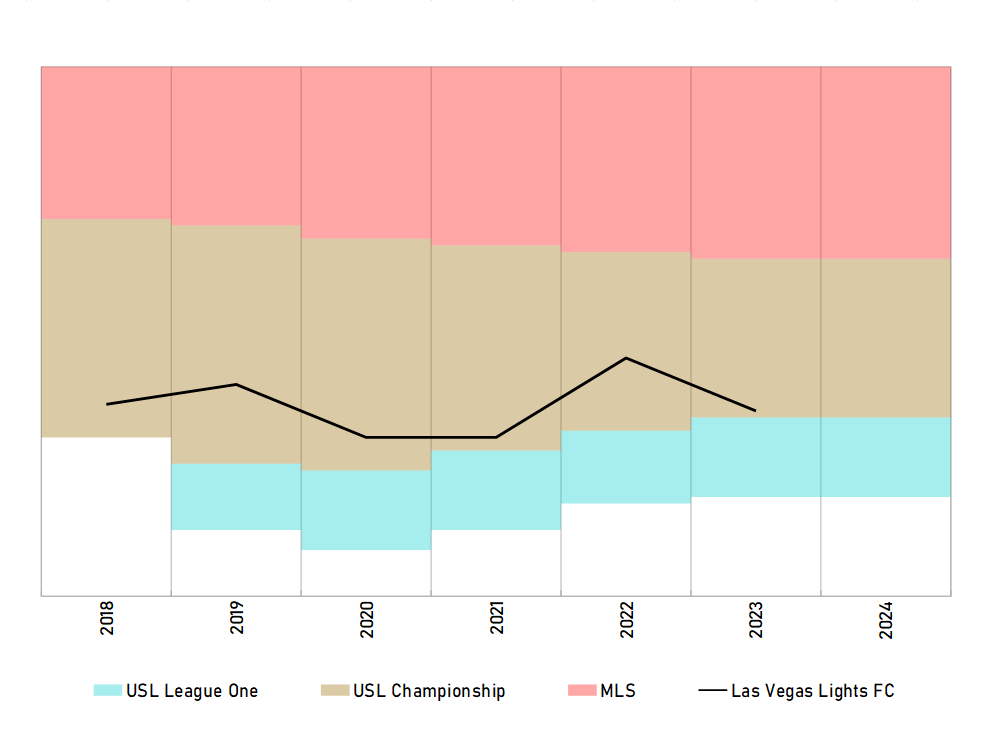
Historical chart of the Lights' regular season performance within the American soccer pyramid

Chelís, a former MLS and Liga MX manager, was introduced as the team's head coach in November and promised to build a team that would entertain. The Lights held their first scouting camps in December and signed several Mexican players using connections from Chelís. In the inaugural preseason match, the team lost 2–0 to the Montreal Impact but attracted a sellout crowd of 10,387 people. The signing of Mexican players caused a language barrier that hindered on-field chemistry during its preseason matches against MLS teams, losing all three, but the team's players worked through the language gap. The team signed former MLS teenage prodigy Freddy Adu, who debuted in a preseason match against his first club, D.C. United.

The team played their inaugural regular season match in Fresno, California, on March 17, 2018, winning 3–2 over Fresno FC. In their first home regular season match, played on March 24, the Lights drew 1–1 with in-state rivals Reno 1868 FC in a match attended by 9,019 spectators. In the 2018 U.S. Open Cup, the Lights defeated FC Tucson and advanced to the third round, where they lost to FC Golden State Force. The club went on a long winless streak in August and September that eliminated the Lights from qualifying for the USL Playoffs. Chelis announced his departure from the club on September 18, following poor performances and an eight-match suspension for misconduct involving a spectator. Las Vegas concluded the season with 8 wins, 19 losses, and 7 draws, and manager Isidro Sánchez was fired on October 14. Former U.S. player and Atlanta Silverbacks coach Eric Wynalda was hired as manager and technical director on October 17.

=== Affiliation with Los Angeles FC ===
On March 12, 2021, Las Vegas Lights FC announced an affiliation partnership with Los Angeles FC (LAFC) of Major League Soccer. Under the one-year partnership, Las Vegas became the USL affiliate of LAFC and shared technical staff, including new manager Steve Cherundolo, a former U.S. national team player. In 2022, the affiliation was extended for another season. The team finished last in the Western Conference during the 2021 season. Cherundolo departed to become head coach of Los Angeles FC and was replaced in Las Vegas by assistant Enrique Duran in February 2022. Duran led the team to an improved finish within a point of earning a playoff berth.

=== Post-affiliation ===
The affiliation agreement ended in 2023 with the establishment of Los Angeles FC 2 in MLS Next Pro as part of a league initiative to create their own reserve league. Duran moved with the program, along with all existing players. The Lights hired Isidro Sánchez, who had been their head coach in 2018, and signed 25 new players during the offseason. Lights FC finished with a 4–22–10 record in the 2023 season. Dennis Sanchez, a former assistant coach for Austin FC II, was hired as head coach of the club in January 2024.

== Stadium ==
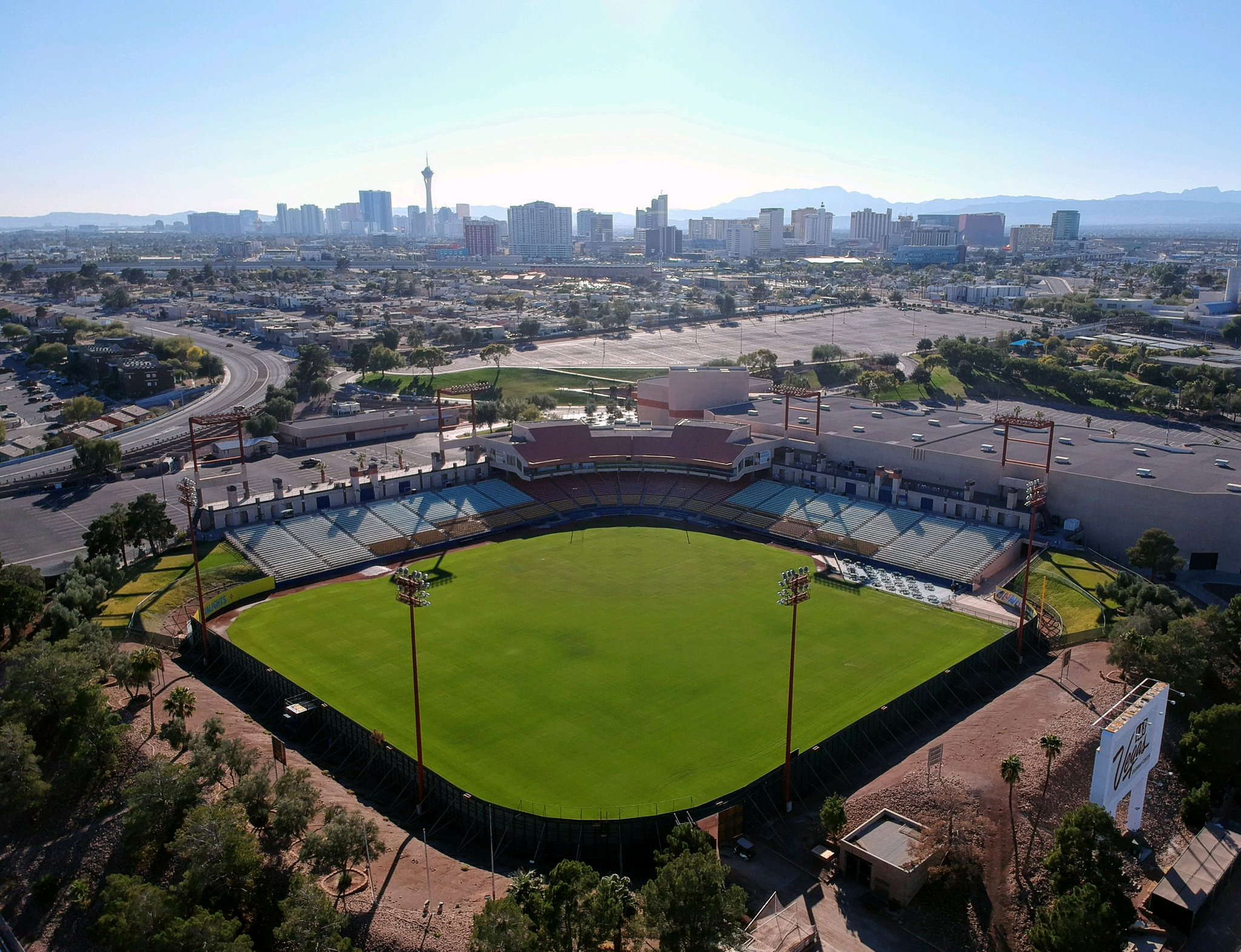
Cashman Field, the team's home venue since 2018

The Lights play their home matches at Cashman Field, a stadium in Downtown Las Vegas that was primarily used for the Las Vegas 51s, a minor league baseball team from 1983 until 2018. It has 9,334 permanent seats and additional standing room capacity. The configuration of Cashman Field is more suited for soccer than other former baseball parks. With center field at a right angle and all the foul territory behind first and third base at equal distance, the field is in a square shape and seats are close to the field for soccer. Prior to the Lights, the stadium also hosted MLS preseason matches between the LA Galaxy and San Jose Earthquakes in 2016 and 2017. The Lights have a 15-year lease agreement with the city government to use Cashman Field, expiring in 2032.

The Las Vegas 51s (renamed the Las Vegas Aviators) relocated to a new stadium in Summerlin in 2019, leaving the Lights as the sole tenant of Cashman Field. The Lights began renovations to the locker rooms and stadium offices prior to the 2019 season, with further plans to make it a soccer-specific venue. The city government also began exploring options for a larger soccer-specific stadium in downtown Las Vegas to accommodate an MLS expansion team. Cashman Field was sold by the city government in March 2025; the team announced that they would stay at the stadium through the 2026 season, but would seek a new home venue. In August 2026, the team confirmed that the 2026 season would be their final season at Cashman, with the final regular season game scheduled for October 17 against Lexington SC. The stadium site is slated for redevelopment.

The team played two regular season games at Las Vegas Ballpark in October 2023.

== Colors and badge ==
The Lights name was announced on August 29, 2017, after being decided in an online poll ahead of five other finalists, including Las Vegas FC, Las Vegas Silver, Club Vegas, Viva Vegas and Las Vegas Action. The name evokes the Las Vegas Strip and Downtown Las Vegas, where many buildings use neon lights and signage. The neon imagery is also reflected in the club's crest, a rotated version of the Welcome to Fabulous Las Vegas sign bordered by neon tubes. The crest also features text written in neon tubes, as well as a pink star. The team's colors, blue, yellow, and pink, were submitted by fans and are derived from the city's traditional seal.

The club's inaugural jerseys were manufactured by BLK and included the logos of sponsors Zappos and Findlay Toyota. The home jersey was designed by Zappos's art director and was primarily black with the team's color in neon trim. The underside had an emoji smiley face covered in confetti, intended to be used in goal celebrations when pulled up and over players' heads. The away jersey was primarily white, with light blue and yellow accents and was unveiled with players donning a body painted replica.

For the 2020 season, the Lights planned to have a set of 17 home jerseys—one for each home match—as part of a fan contest. They were all planned to retain the main color scheme of yellow, blue, and pink, and reflect local communities in Clark County.

=== Sponsorship ===
Period	Kit manufacturer	Shirt sponsor
2018–2020	BLK	Zappos
2021	Tigra	Findlay Toyota
2022	Meyba	Coin Cloud
2023	Meyba	LiUNA!
2024	Hummel	LiUNA!
2025	Hummel	Silk Title
2026	Joma	TBD

== Ownership and management ==
The Lights were founded as Las Vegas Lights, LLC by Brett Lashbrook, a former consultant to USL and MLS clubs in Florida. Lashbrook spent part of his childhood in the Las Vegas area and was part of Orlando City SC during their transition from the USL to MLS and also worked for the Tampa Bay Rowdies. The team's vice president of corporate partnerships is Steve Pastorino, who worked with the Chicago Fire and Oakland Athletics as marketing director.

The team's first head coach and technical director was Chelís, who left the club in September 2018 after earning a losing record and missing 12 matches due to a suspension. His son and assistant coach, Isidro Sánchez, took over for the remainder of the inaugural season until his firing in October 2018. Former U.S. national team player and television commentator Eric Wynalda was subsequently hired and led the Lights to an improved record but short of a playoff spot. On June 17, 2020, Wynalda was fired by the Lights for an undisclosed violation of league rules during the USL's preparations to resume play amid the COVID-19 pandemic. Former MLS coach Frank Yallop was named as interim head coach later that month.

In April 2018, the Lights became the first professional sports team in the United States to be sponsored by a licensed marijuana dispensary. As part of the agreement, the Nuwu dispensary has a sign in Cashman Field advertising its downtown store, located two blocks from the stadium. Two months later, the club announced a partnership with bookmaker William Hill to offer in-game betting via a special mobile app, along with free $5 bets for each home win.

On January 16, 2024, Las Vegas Lights, LLC was sold to an investor group led by former Major League Baseball star José Bautista.

== Club culture ==
The Lights have used unusual promotions and gimmicks to attract fans, including a DJ in the supporters' section and two llama mascots, Dolly and Dotty. The llamas were provided by sponsors Zappos and appear during tailgate parties and pre-game festivities, including the team photos; during one incident, a llama defecated on the field with only two minutes left before kickoff. The team's original mascot was "Cash the Soccer Rocker", a dancing caricature of Johnny Cash and Elvis Presley, who rides a Harley Davidson motorcycle around the stadium. Cash was retired and replaced with a pink llama mascot named Viva after the 2023 season. The team's players are rewarded with casino chips for regular season home wins with three or more goals, out of a pot of $30,000 supplied by the Plaza Hotel & Casino for the team. Owner Brett Lashbrook stated that he wanted his team to be "a fast, fun soccer party" and encouraged the use of flags and smoke bombs by supporters. The team regularly hosts "cash drop" stunts, in which helicopters or other means are used to drop money onto the field for fans to grab. One instance with a helicopter in September 2019 was investigated by the Federal Aviation Administration for improper altitude control.

Before home matches, the Lights award a "pink scarf" to Las Vegas residents for their contributions to the community at large. The inaugural honoree of the pink scarf was mayor Carolyn Goodman. The team had a rivalry with Reno 1868 FC, the other USL team in the state of Nevada, called the Silver State Cup. The rivalry was named in an online poll by fans of both teams ahead of their first match in March 2018. Reno ceased operations after the 2020 season due to financial issues caused by the COVID-19 pandemic. The Lights' supporters' group is "BLVD Locals", which organizes a march to the match.

== Broadcasting ==
The Lights broadcast most of their matches on KVVU, an over-the-air channel serving the Las Vegas market, or its subchannel Silver State Sports & Entertainment Network (SSSEN). For the 2024 season, 28 matches were broadcast on SSSEN and four were on KVVU. Matches are also streamed nationally on ESPN+ as part of a league-wide broadcast agreement; the same agreement includes national broadcasts for some matches on CBS Sports Network in English and TUDN in Spanish. Radio broadcasts for Lights matches are carried on 1460 AM ESPN Deportes in Spanish.

The inaugural preseason match in February 2018 had been aired on "KCLV", a city-run government access channel, but a broadcast agreement could not be reached due to the commercial nature of the club. The Lights moved to KVCW (MyLVTV), a commercial over-the-air station, for the 2018 season. Some of the club's matches were broadcast nationally on ESPNews and ESPN3. The new broadcast agreement with KVVU and SSSEN was announced in October 2022 and took effect immediately.

== Players and staff ==
=== Roster ===
As of June 30, 2026

Note: Flags indicate national team as defined under FIFA eligibility rules; some limited exceptions apply. Players may hold more than one non-FIFA nationality.

No.	Pos.	Nation	Player
1	GK	CAN	Triston Henry
3	DF	USA	Nate Jones
6	DF	USA	Nyk Sessock
8	MF	USA	Kyle Scott
9	FW	VEN	Manuel Arteaga
10	MF	DOM	Edison Azcona
11	FW	USA	Christian Pinzón
13	GK	USA	Charlie Lanphier
14	FW	USA	Johnny Rodriguez
17	MF	USA	Patrick Leal
18	MF	USA	Carson Locker

No.	Pos.	Nation	Player
20	DF	USA	Shawn Smart
23	MF	USA	Marc Ybarra
25	FW	VIN	Oalex Anderson
27	MF	ITA	Giorgio Probo
30	DF	USA	Ben Ofeimu
33	DF	MEX	Aarón Guillén
43	MF	GHA	Abraham Okyere
45	DF	USA	Blake Pope
81	DF	CAN	Themi Antonoglou
96	GK	USA	Carver Miller

=== Out on loan ===
Note: Flags indicate national team as defined under FIFA eligibility rules; some limited exceptions apply. Players may hold more than one non-FIFA nationality.

No.	Pos.	Nation	Player
7	FW	USA	Ben Mines (on loan to Hartford Athletic)
26	FW	SOM	Handwalla Bwana (on loan to Real Monarchs)
99	GK	USA	Jared Mazzola (on loan to Athletic Club Boise)

=== Staff ===
Title	Name	Nation
Owner	José Bautista	Dominican Republic
CEO	Shawn McIntosh	Italy
Sporting director	Gianleonardo Neglia	Italy
Head coach	Devin Rensing	United States
Assistant coach	Gerson Echeverry	Colombia
Assistant coach	Liviu Bird	United States
Goalkeeping Coach	Maximiliano Jose Rabinovich	Argentina

=== Head coaches ===
- Includes USL Regular Season, USL Playoffs, and U.S. Open Cup. Excludes friendlies.

Coach	Nationality	Tenure	Games	Win	Loss	Draw	Win %
Chelís	Mexico	November 14, 2017–September 18, 2018	30	8	16	6	26.67
Isidro Sánchez	Canada	September 18, 2018–October 16, 2018	6	1	4	1	16.67
Eric Wynalda	United States	October 17, 2018–June 17, 2020	36	12	16	8	33.33
Frank Yallop	Canada	June 29, 2020–January 31, 2021	16	2	9	5	12.50
Steve Cherundolo	United States	March 12, 2021–January 3, 2022	32	6	23	3	18.75
Enrique Duran	Spain	February 4, 2022–January 25, 2023	34	12	13	9	35.29
Isidro Sánchez	Canada	January 25, 2023–January 29, 2024	36	4	22	10	11.11
Dennis Sanchez	United States	January 29, 2024–December 24, 2024	39	16	12	11	41.03
Antonio Nocerino	Italy	January 9, 2025–June 10, 2025	12	3	6	3	25.00
Giovanni Troise (interim)	Italy	June 14, 2025–August 3, 2025	7	3	4	0	42.86
Devin Rensing	United States	August 4, 2025–present	0	0	0	0	—

== Record ==
=== Year-by-year ===
As of December 27, 2025

Year	League													USL Cup	CCC	USOC	Top scorer		Avg. attendance	
Year	Div	League	P	W	L	D	GF	GA	GD	Pts	Pos	Pos	Playoffs	USL Cup	CCC	USOC	Player	Goals	Avg. attendance	
2018	2	USL	34	8	19	7	50	74	−24	31	15th	29th	Playoffs	DNQ	DNE	DNQ	R3	(Mexico) Raúl Mendiola	10	6,786
2019	2	USLC	34	11	15	8	46	56	−10	41	13th	24th	DNQ	R3	DNE	DNQ	(United States) Irvin Parra	15	7,711	
2020	2	USLC	16	2	9	5	24	34	−10	11	15th	30th	DNQ	NH	DNE	DNQ	(Malawi) Yamikani Chester	4	—N/a	
2021	2	USLC	32	6	23	3	41	77	−36	21	15th	29th	DNQ	NH	DNE	DNQ	(United States) Cal Jennings	11	5,520	
2022	2	USLC	34	12	13	9	40	50	−10	45	9th	16th	DNQ	R2	DNE	DNQ	(Mexico) Danny Trejo	14	1,340	
2023	2	USLC	34	3	21	10	36	66	−30	19	12th	23th	DNQ	R3	DNE	DNQ	(El Salvador) Danny Ríos	5	1,085	
2024	2	USLC	34	13	10	11	49	46	+3	50	4th	10th	SF	DNP	Ro32	DNQ	(Jamaica) Khori Bennett	14	1,915	
2025	2	USLC	30	6	15	9	23	50	-27	27	12th	24th	DNQ	GS	R3	DNQ	(United States) Johnny Rodriguez	9	2,803	
