= 2025 FC Tulsa season =

FC Tulsa
2025 season
- Head coach: Luke Spencer
- Stadium: ONEOK Field; Tulsa, Oklahoma
- USL Championship: Conference: 1st Overall: 3rd
- USLC Playoffs: Western Conference Champions
- 2025 U.S. Open Cup: Third Round
- 2025 USL Cup: Group Stage
- Black Gold Derby: Not Held

The 2025 FC Tulsa season was the franchise's 11th season in the USL Championship, the second-tier professional soccer league in the United States. The team also participated in the 2025 U.S. Open Cup and the 2025 USL Cup.

On March 12, 2025, FC Tulsa announced that it had partnered with Blitz Academy FC to launch the FC Tulsa Academy.

On October 4, 2025, FC Tulsa clinched its first home playoff game (and the first soccer playoff game in Tulsa since 1983) with a win over Lexington SC. FC Tulsa also set a new club record for most points in a season with that same win. On October 11, 2025, FC Tulsa clinched the #1 seed in the Western Conference with a win over San Antonio FC.

== Club ==
Squad no.	Name	Nationality	Position(s)	Date of birth (age)	Previous club
Goalkeepers
1	Michael Creek	(United States)	GK	March 5, 1998 (age 28)	(United States) Saint Louis City SC
99	Johan Peñaranda	(United States)	GK	January 3, 2000 (age 26)	(United States) Northern Colorado Hailstorm
Defenders
20	Patrick Seagrist	(United States)	LB	February 21, 1998 (age 28)	(United States) Colorado Springs Switchbacks
4	Delentz Pierre	(Haiti)	CB	November 16, 2000 (age 25)	(United States) Real Monarchs
15	Lamar Batista	(United States)	CB	March 7, 1998 (age 28)	(United States) North Carolina FC
91	AB Cissoko	(France)	CB	December 27, 1999 (age 26)	(United States) Memphis 901
2	Owen Damm	(United States)	RB	August 22, 2003 (age 23)	(United States) Louisville City FC
14	Arthur Rogers	(England)	RB	September 26, 1996 (age 30)	(United States) Northern Colorado Hailstorm
21	Lucas Stauffer	(United States)	RB	April 21, 1995 (age 31)	(United States) Lexington SC
47	Harvey St Clair	(Scotland)	RB	November 13, 1998 (age 27)	(Italy) Vis Pesaro
Midfielders
10	Kalil ElMedkhar	(United States)	AM	August 18, 1999 (age 27)	(United States) Loudoun United
22	Stefan Lukic	(Serbia)	AM	June 1, 1996 (age 30)	(United States) Chattanooga Red Wolves SC
5	Marcos Cerato	(Brazil)	CM	February 8, 1994 (age 32)	(Brazil) Brusque
6	Boubacar Diallo	(United States)	CM	December 9, 2002 (age 23)	(United States) Philadelphia Union II
8	Jamie Webber	(South Africa)	CM	January 21, 1998 (age 28)	(South Africa) Sekhukhune United F.C.
77	Faysal Bettache	(England)	CM	July 7, 2000 (age 26)	(United States) Tacoma Defiance
7	Andrew Booth	(Jamaica)	RM	July 16, 1997 (age 29)	(United States) Miami FC
26	Giordano Colli	(Australia)	RM	March 12, 2000 (age 26)	(Australia) Perth Glory
Forwards
9	Taylor Calheira	(United States)	CF	April 26, 2002 (age 24)	(United States) New York City FC II
35	Al Hassan Toure	(Australia)	CF	May 30, 2000 (age 26)	(France) AC Ajaccio
21	Alex Dalou	(United States)	FW	August 24, 2000 (age 26)	(United States) Albion San Diego

USL Academy player
On Loan

=== Staff ===
As of March 21, 2025

- (United States) Caleb Patterson-Sewell – Sporting Director / General Manager
- (United States) Luke Spencer – Head Coach
- (England) Alexis Vizarelis - Assistant Coach
- (Australia) Andrew Christiansen - Assistant Coach
- (Brazil) Leandro Spinola – Sports Science Director
- (United States) Destiny Lalaguna – Head Athletic Trainer
- (Canada) Alnoor Hasham – Director of Soccer Administration

=== USL Championship ===
==== Standings — Western Conference ====
Pos	Team	Pld	W	L	T	GF	GA	GD	Pts	Qualification
1	FC Tulsa	30	16	5	9	50	30	+20	57	Playoffs
2	Sacramento Republic FC	30	13	8	9	44	27	+17	48 (Note: Sacramento Republic FC are ahead of New Mexico United on head-to-head points: SAC 6, NMU 0.)	Playoffs
3	New Mexico United	30	14	10	6	45	41	+4	48	Playoffs
4	El Paso Locomotive FC	30	10	9	11	47	45	+2	41	Playoffs
5	Phoenix Rising FC	30	9	8	13	48	48	0	40 (Note: Phoenix Rising FC are ahead of San Antonio FC on head-to-head points: PHX 6, SAN 0.)	Playoffs
6	San Antonio FC	30	11	12	7	39	38	+1	40	Playoffs
7	Orange County SC	30	10	11	9	44	45	−1	39	Playoffs
8	Colorado Springs Switchbacks FC	30	10	13	7	35	47	−12	37	Playoffs
9	Lexington SC	30	9	12	9	31	42	−11	36	
10	Oakland Roots SC	30	8	14	8	42	52	−10	32	
11	Monterey Bay FC	30	7	15	8	27	45	−18	29	
12	Las Vegas Lights FC	30	6	15	9	23	50	−27	27	

Source: USL Championship Standings
Rules for classification: 1) head-to-head points; 2) head-to-head goal differential; 3) points-per-game within conference; 4) total wins; 5) total goal differential; 6) total goals scored; 7) points earned against top four Conference finishers; 8) disciplinary points; 9) coin toss or drawing of lots

==== Match results ====
March 8 1	Phoenix Rising FC	0-1	FC Tulsa	Phoenix, Arizona
7:00 PM PST		Report	Dalou 25'	Stadium: Phoenix Rising Soccer Stadium; Attendance: 6,478

March 15 2	FC Tulsa	1-0	Tampa Bay Rowdies	Tulsa, Oklahoma
7:00 PM CDT	Seagrist 73'	Report		Stadium: ONEOK Field; Attendance: 3,621

March 22 3	FC Tulsa	0-1	North Carolina FC	Tulsa, Oklahoma
7:00 PM CDT		Report	Dolabella 82'	Stadium: ONEOK Field; Attendance: 2,931

March 28 4	FC Tulsa	1-0	Sacramento Republic FC	Tulsa, Oklahoma
7:00 PM CDT	Calheira 87'	Report		Stadium: ONEOK Field; Attendance: 2,389

April 12 5	FC Tulsa	1-2	Oakland Roots SC	Tulsa, Oklahoma
7:00 PM CDT	Damm 42'	Report	Prentice 31', 45+6'	Stadium: ONEOK Field; Attendance: 3,307; Referee: Muhammad Hassan

April 19 6	Las Vegas Lights FC	1-4	FC Tulsa	Las Vegas, Nevada
7:30 PM PDT	Noël 51' (pen.)	Report	Lukic 14'; Calheira 28' (pen.), 67'; Dalou 42'	Stadium: Cashman Field; Referee: Matthew Corrigan

May 3 7	Orange County SC	2-1	FC Tulsa	Irvine, California
7:00 PM PDT	MacKinnon 55', 80'	Report	Calheira 74'	Stadium: Championship Soccer Stadium; Attendance: 4,075; Referee: Trevor Wiseman

May 10 8	FC Tulsa	1-1	El Paso Locomotive FC	Tulsa, Oklahoma
7:00 PM CDT	ElMedkhar 86'	Report	Cabrera 32'	Stadium: ONEOK Field; Referee: Mark Verso

May 18 9	Lexington SC	0-2	FC Tulsa	Lexington, Kentucky
7:00 PM EDT		Report	Calheira 41' (pen.); Batista 9+5'	Stadium: Lexington SC Stadium; Attendance: 3,503; Referee: Abdou Ndiaye

May 28 10	San Antonio FC	1-1	FC Tulsa	San Antonio, Texas
7:00 PM CDT	Hernández 70' (pen.)	Report	Calheira 70' (pen.)	Stadium: Toyota Field; Attendance: 5,659; Referee: Ekaterina Koroleva

June 7 11	Sacramento Republic FC	0-1	FC Tulsa	Sacramento, California
7:00 PM PDT		Report	ElMedkhar 10'	Stadium: Heart Health Park; Attendance: 8,176; Referee: Elijio Arreguin

June 14 12	FC Tulsa	1-1	Phoenix Rising FC	Tulsa, Oklahoma
7:30 PM CDT	Rogers 80'	Report	Sacko 15'	Stadium: ONEOK Field; Attendance: 3,444; Referee: Natalie Simon

July 5 13	Miami FC	2-2	FC Tulsa	Miami, Florida
7:00 PM EDT	Bonfiglio 17' (pen.), 65'; Romero (red card) 45+4'	Report	Calheira 13' (pen.); Goldthorp 45+1'	Stadium: Pitbull Stadium; Attendance: 1,008; Referee: John Matto

July 12 14	FC Tulsa	4-3	Las Vegas Lights FC	Tulsa, Oklahoma
7:30 PM CDT	Serrato 9'; Webber 16'; Calheira 76'; Gärtig 90+2' (o.g.)	Report	Rodriguez 33'; Smart 45+2', 62'	Stadium: ONEOK Field; Attendance: 2,605; Referee: Adorae Monroy

July 16 15	FC Tulsa	2-1	Monterey Bay FC	Tulsa, Oklahoma
7:30 PM CDT	Diallo 47'; Lukic 48'	Report	Malango 9'	Stadium: ONEOK Field; Attendance: 3,745; Referee: Edson Carvajal

July 19 16	Louisville City FC	1-1	FC Tulsa	Louisville, Kentucky
7:00 PM CDT	Lancaster 90+2'	Report	ElMedkhar 90+5'	Stadium: Lynn Family Stadium; Attendance: 8,859; Referee: Luis Arroyo

August 1 17	FC Tulsa	3–2	Loudoun United FC	Tulsa, Oklahoma
7:30 PM CDT	Calheira 43'; Lukić 84'; Colli 90+5'	Report	Bidois 14'; Leerman 67'	Stadium: ONEOK Field; Attendance: 3,871; Referee: Corbyn May

August 6 18	Monterey Bay FC	2–3	FC Tulsa	Seaside, California
7:00 PM PDT	Klein 51'; Ivanovic 59'	Report	Dalou 12'; Lukic 71'; Rogers 86' (pen.)	Stadium: Cardinale Stadium; Attendance: 2,722; Referee: Muhammad Hassan

August 9 19	FC Tulsa	5–2	New Mexico United	Tulsa, Oklahoma
7:30 PM CDT	Calheira 18' (pen.); St Clair 46'; Serrato 51'; ElMedkhar 54'; Dalou 83'	Report	Hurst 34'; Jabang 41'	Stadium: ONEOK Field; Attendance: 2,706; Referee: Jeremy Scheer

August 16 20	Hartford Athletic	1–1	FC Tulsa	Hartford, Connecticut
7:00 PM EDT	Edwards 46'	Report	Farrell 45+7' (o.g.)	Stadium: Trinity Health Stadium; Referee: Abdou Ndiaye

August 23 21	FC Tulsa	1–0	Orange County SC	Tulsa, Oklahoma
7:30 PM CDT	ElMedkhar 24'	Report	Kelly (red card) 20'	Stadium: ONEOK Field; Attendance: 3,317; Referee: Nabil Bensalah

August 30 22	Colorado Springs Switchbacks FC	2–0	FC Tulsa	Colorado Springs, Colorado
7:00 PM MDT	Huerman 58'; Mrowka 90+11'	Report		Stadium: Weidner Field; Attendance: 6,411; Referee: Rodrigo Albuquerque

September 6 23	FC Tulsa	1-1	Birmingham Legion FC	Tulsa, Oklahoma
7:30 PM CDT	Cerato (yellow card) 45+5'; Calheira 45+9'; ElMedkhar (yellow card) 58'; Batista (yellow card) 90+2'	Report	Tregarthen (yellow card) 17'; Martínez (yellow card) 32'; Spencer (yellow card) 42'; Travis (yellow card) 45+9'; Suarez (yellow card) 55'; Rufe 87'	Stadium: ONEOK Field; Attendance: 4,012; Referee: Muhammad Kaleia

September 13 24	New Mexico United	0–1	FC Tulsa	Albuquerque, New Mexico
7:00 PM MDT		Report	Rivas 90+3' (o.g.)	Stadium: Isotopes Park; Attendance: 9,177; Referee: Calin Radosav

September 20 25	Oakland Roots SC	1-1	FC Tulsa	Oakland, California
7:00 PM PDT	Calheira 51'	Report	Wilson 23'	Stadium: Oakland Coliseum; Attendance: 4,938; Referee: Elton García

September 27 26	Indy Eleven	2–1	FC Tulsa	Indianapolis, Indiana
7:00 PM EST	Schaefer 8'; Murphy (yellow card) 45+1'; Zalinsky (yellow card) 51'; Blake 68'; Pruter (yellow card) 88'; Lindley (yellow card) 90+2'	Report	St Clair (yellow card) 33'; Diallo 80'; Dalou (yellow card) 89'	Stadium: Carroll Stadium; Attendance: 9,512; Referee: John Mato

October 4 27	FC Tulsa	3-0	Lexington SC	Tulsa, Oklahoma
7:00 PM CDT	Webber 40', 88'; Colli 65'	Report	Ketterer (red card) 37'	Stadium: ONEOK Field; Attendance: 3,199; Referee: Brad Jensen

October 11 28	FC Tulsa	2-0	San Antonio FC	Tulsa, Oklahoma
7:00 PM CDT	Calheira 8'; Batista 75'	Report		Stadium: ONEOK Field; Referee: John Griggs

October 18 29	El Paso Locomotive FC	1–1	FC Tulsa	El Paso, Texas
7:00 PM MDT	Torres 24'	Report	Lukic 90+2'	Stadium: Southwest University Park; Attendance: 5,657; Referee: Natalie Simon

October 25 30	FC Tulsa	3–0	Colorado Springs Switchbacks FC	Tulsa, Oklahoma
7:00 PM CDT	ElMedkhar 10'; Calheira 57', 79'	Report		Stadium: ONEOK Field; Attendance: 2,756; Referee: Joshua Encarnación

==== USL Championship Playoffs ====
November 1 Conference Quarterfinal	FC Tulsa	1-0 (a.e.t.)	Colorado Springs Switchbacks FC	Tulsa, Oklahoma
7:00 PM CST	Lukic 92'	Report		Stadium: ONEOK Field; Attendance: 7,583; Referee: Ryan Carrigan

November 8 Conference Semifinal	FC Tulsa	1-0 (a.e.t.)	Phoenix Rising FC	Tulsa, Oklahoma
7:00 PM CST	Lukic 120+2'	Report		Stadium: ONEOK Field; Attendance: 7,917; Referee: Brandon Stevis

November 15 Conference Final	FC Tulsa	3-0	New Mexico United	Tulsa, Oklahoma
7:00 PM CST	Calheira 39', 57'; Webber 76'	Report		Stadium: ONEOK Field; Referee: Greg Dopka

November 22 USL Championship Final	FC Tulsa	0-0 (a.e.t.) (3–5 p)	Pittsburgh Riverhounds SC	Tulsa, Oklahoma
11:00 AM CST		Report		Stadium: ONEOK Field; Referee: Elijio Arreguin
	Penalties
	Calheira (penalty scored); Lukic (penalty missed); Colli (penalty scored); Batista (penalty scored)		(penalty scored) Jacquesson; (penalty scored) Mertz; (penalty scored) Boone; (penalty scored) Suber; (penalty scored) Ydrach

=== U.S. Open Cup ===
March 18 First Round	Tulsa Athletic (TLFC)	0-1	FC Tulsa	Tulsa, Oklahoma
7:30 PM CDT		Report	Calheira 84' (pen.)	Stadium: Athletic Community Field at Hicks Park; Referee: Rodrigo Albuquerque
Note: 3rd Tulsa Derby

April 2 Second Round	Forward Madison FC (USL1)	1-3	FC Tulsa	Madison, Wisconsin
6:30 PM CDT	Bartman 68'	Report	Damm 21'; ElMedkhar 31'; Calheira 51' (pen.)	Stadium: Breese Stevens Field; Referee: Felix Granados

April 16 Third Round	FC Tulsa	1-1 (a.e.t.) (2–4 p)	Phoenix Rising FC (USLC)	Tulsa, Oklahoma
7:00 PM CDT	Lukic 86'	Report	Margaritha 51'	Stadium: Hurricane Soccer & Track Stadium; Referee: Rodrigo Albuquerque
	Penalties
	ElMedkhar (penalty missed); Bettache (penalty missed); Rogers (penalty scored); Colli (penalty scored)		(penalty scored) Cuello; (penalty scored) Scearce; (penalty scored) Walls; (penalty scored) Sainté

=== USL Cup ===
==== Group 3 ====
Pos	Lg	Team	Pld	W	PKW	PKL	L	GF	GA	GD	Pts	Qualification
1	USLC	Indy Eleven	4	3	1	0	0	8	2	+6	11	Advance to knockout stage
2	USLC	Birmingham Legion FC	4	3	0	1	0	8	4	+4	10	Advance to knockout stage (wild card)
3	USL1	Chattanooga Red Wolves SC	4	1	1	0	2	4	8	−4	5	
4	USLC	FC Tulsa	4	1	0	1	2	8	7	+1	4	
5	USL1	Forward Madison FC	4	1	0	1	2	3	7	−4	4	
6	USL1	One Knoxville SC	4	0	1	0	3	2	5	−3	2	

Updated to match(es) played on July 26, 2025. Source: USL
Rules for classification: 1) points; 2) head-to-head points earned in group play; 3) total wins in group play; 4) goals for in group play; 5) goals against in group play; 6) disciplinary points; 7) coin toss.

==== Match results ====
April 26, 2025 Group Stage	One Knoxville SC	2-2 (4-2 p)	FC Tulsa	Knoxville, Tennessee
7:00 PM EDT	Gøling 34'; Tekiela 72' (pen.)	Report	Calheira 2'; Touré 90+5'	Stadium: Covenant Health Park; Attendance: 6,378; Referee: Edson Carvajal

May 31, 2025 Group Stage	FC Tulsa	1-2	Birmingham Legion FC	Tulsa, Oklahoma
7:30 PM CDT	ElMedkhar 62'	Report	Damus 59' (pen.); Tregarthen 68'	Stadium: ONEOK Field; Attendance: 4,467; Referee: Benjamin Meyer

June 28, 2025 Group Stage	FC Tulsa	4-1	Chattanooga Red Wolves SC	Tulsa, Oklahoma
7:30 PM CDT	Calheira 20'; Webber 36'; Lukic 51'; Damm 62'	Report	Knapp 12'	Stadium: ONEOK Field; Attendance: 3,056; Referee: Matthew Thompson

July 26, 2025 Group Stage	Indy Eleven	2-1	FC Tulsa	Indianapolis, Indiana
7:00 PM EDT	Williams 38'; Batista 51' (o.g.)	Report	Colli 72'	Stadium: Michael A. Carroll Stadium; Attendance: 9,065; Referee: Gerald Flores
