= 2025 USL Cup =

2nd edition of cup competition in American soccer

USL Jägermeister Cup

Tournament details
- Country: United States
- Dates: April 25, 2025 – October 4, 2025
- Teams: 38

Final positions
- Champions: Hartford Athletic (1st title)
- Runners-up: Sacramento Republic FC
- Semifinalists: Rhode Island FC; Greenville Triumph SC

Tournament statistics
- Matches played: 80
- Goals scored: 227 (2.84 per match)
- Attendance: 341,197 (4,265 per match)
- Top goal scorer: 12 players tied with 3 goals each
- All statistics correct as of October 5, 2025.

The 2025 USL Cup was the second edition of the USL Cup (known as the USL Jägermeister Cup for sponsorship reasons). The competition was open to all clubs in USL Championship and USL League One.

Northern Colorado Hailstorm FC, the winner of the 2024 USL Cup, had their franchise agreement with the United Soccer League terminated and were unable to defend their title. Hartford Athletic won its first trophy in the final, defeating Sacramento Republic FC.

== Format ==
The 2025 edition of the USL Cup was a professional soccer tournament held between teams in USL Championship and USL League One. Teams were split into six groups of six to seven teams; each team played two teams in their group at home, and two others away. The teams winning their group, along with the two teams with the most points among those that did not win their group, will moved to a single-elimination knockout round.

=== Schedule ===
The 2025 USL Cup ran concurrently with the 2025 USL Championship season and the 2025 USL League One season. The tournament began roughly two months into the league seasons and end shortly before the end of the league seasons and start of the league playoffs.

The groups for the 2025 USL Cup were announced on December 12, 2024, and the schedule was released on December 19, 2024.

== Access ==
All 24 clubs in USL Championship and 14 clubs in USL League One entered the 2025 USL Cup in the group stage.

Round	Entrants	Number of games	Date(s)
Group stage (38 clubs)	24 clubs from USL Championship; 14 clubs from USL League One	76	April 25, 2025 – July 26, 2025
Quarterfinals (8 clubs)	6 group stage winners 2 wild cards	4	August 20, 2025
Semifinals (4 clubs)	4 winners from quarterfinals	2	September 10, 2025
Final (2 clubs)	2 winners from semifinals	1	October 4, 2025

=== Location map ===
Locations of teams in the 2025 USL Cup
- Group 1
- Group 2
- Group 3
- Group 4
- Group 5
- Group 6

== Group stage ==
Number of teams per tier still in competition
Championship	League 1	Total
24 / 24	14 / 14	38 / 38

The group stage was played from April 25 to July 26. Teams were divided into six regional groups of six or seven teams. Teams played two teams in their group at home and two other teams away.

If a team won in regulation, they received three points in the standings, while the loser received zero. If the game was tied at the end of regulation, a penalty kick shootout occurred; the winner received two points and the loser will received one.

The top team in each group reached a single-elimination knockout stage. Of the remaining teams, the two teams with the most points also reached the knockout stage, with most goals scored being used as first tiebreaker.

=== Group 1 ===
Pos	Lg	Team	Pld	W	PKW	PKL	L	GF	GA	GD	Pts	Qualification
1	USLC	Sacramento Republic FC	4	3	0	0	1	6	1	+5	9	Advance to knockout stage
2	USLC	Las Vegas Lights FC	4	3	0	0	1	7	6	+1	9	
3	USLC	Monterey Bay FC	4	2	0	0	2	6	6	0	6	
4	USLC	Orange County SC	4	2	0	0	2	5	6	−1	6	
5	USL1	AV Alta FC	4	1	1	0	2	5	6	−1	5	
6	USLC	Oakland Roots SC	4	1	0	1	2	5	6	−1	4	
7	USL1	Spokane Velocity FC	4	1	0	0	3	2	5	−3	3	

Updated to match(es) played on July 26, 2025. Source: USL

==== Matches ====
April 26	Orange County SC	1–3	Las Vegas Lights FC	Irvine, California
7:00 PM PDT	Dunbar 45+3' (pen.)	Report	O'Driscoll 14'; Pinzón 34'; Rodriguez 56' (pen.)	Stadium: Championship Soccer Stadium; Attendance: 3,350; Referee: Gerald Flores

April 26	Sacramento Republic FC	1–0	AV Alta FC	Sacramento, California
7:00 PM PDT	Herrera 45+1'	Report		Stadium: Heart Health Park; Attendance: 8,898; Referee: Servando Berna Rico

April 27	Spokane Velocity FC	2–1	Oakland Roots SC	Spokane, Washington
7:00 PM PDT	L. Gil 25'; Peláez 43'	Report	Margvelashvili 52'	Stadium: One Spokane Stadium; Attendance: 2,205; Referee: Brad Jensen

April 30	Las Vegas Lights FC	2–1	AV Alta FC	Las Vegas, Nevada
7:30 PM PDT	Pearson 4'; Pickering 73'	Report	Blancas 47'	Stadium: Cashman Field; Attendance: 1,795; Referee: Ekaterina Koroleva

May 28	Monterey Bay FC	1–0	Spokane Velocity FC	Seaside, California
7:00 PM PDT	Gallaway 4'	Report		Stadium: Cardinale Stadium; Attendance: 2,014; Referee: Brandon Stevis

May 31	Monterey Bay FC	3–2	Orange County SC	Seaside, California
7:00 PM PDT	Paul 36', 67'; Larsson 85'	Report	Pedro Guimaraes 27'; Dunbar 90+3'	Stadium: Cardinale Stadium; Attendance: 3,006; Referee: Calin Radosav

May 31	Sacramento Republic FC	4–0	Las Vegas Lights FC	Sacramento, California
7:00 PM PDT	Spaulding 36'; Parano 37'; Benítez 53'; Cicerone 58'	Report		Stadium: Heart Health Park; Attendance: 9,437; Referee: Abdou Ndiaye

May 31	AV Alta FC	2–2 (4–2 p)	Oakland Roots SC	Lancaster, California
7:30 PM PDT	Cruz 57'; Alassane 90+5'	Report	Doner 62'; Wilson 63'	Stadium: Lancaster Municipal Stadium; Attendance: 3,951; Referee: Mark Verso
	Penalties
	Blancas (penalty scored); Cerritos (penalty scored); Cruz (penalty scored); Pehlivanov (penalty scored)		(penalty missed) Njie; (penalty scored) Greene; (penalty scored) Hackshaw; (penalty missed) Wilson

June 28	Las Vegas Lights FC	2–0	Spokane Velocity FC	Las Vegas, Nevada
7:30 PM PDT	Stojanovic 35' (pen.); Pickering 51'	Report		Stadium: Cashman Field; Attendance: 2,597; Referee: Servando Berna Rico

June 28	Oakland Roots SC	2–1	Monterey Bay FC	Oakland, California
7:00 PM PDT	Muir 17' (o.g.); Doner 58'	Report	Ivanovic 86'	Stadium: Oakland Coliseum; Attendance: 4,957; Referee: Matthew Corrigan

June 28	Orange County SC	1–0	Sacramento Republic FC	Irvine, California
7:00 PM PDT	Pedro Guimaraes 90+5'	Report		Stadium: Championship Soccer Stadium; Attendance: 4,328; Referee: Muhammad Kaleia

July 26	Oakland Roots SC	0–1	Orange County SC	Oakland, California
1:00 PM PDT		Report	Jamison 30'	Stadium: Oakland Coliseum; Attendance: 5,418; Referee: Cristian Campo

July 26	Spokane Velocity FC	0–1	Sacramento Republic FC	Spokane, Washington
7:00 PM PDT		Report	Benítez 10'	Stadium: One Spokane Stadium; Attendance: 3,068; Referee: Brad Jensen

July 26	AV Alta FC	2–1	Monterey Bay FC	Lancaster, California
8:00 PM PDT	Lay 9'; Aoumaich 73'	Report	Gnaulati 8'	Stadium: Lancaster Municipal Stadium; Attendance: 4,408; Referee: Muhammad Kaleia

=== Group 2 ===
Pos	Lg	Team	Pld	W	PKW	PKL	L	GF	GA	GD	Pts	Qualification
1	USLC	San Antonio FC	4	3	0	1	0	6	2	+4	10	Advance to knockout stage
2	USLC	New Mexico United	4	1	2	1	0	9	7	+2	8	
3	USLC	Colorado Springs Switchbacks FC	4	2	0	1	1	7	4	+3	7	
4	USLC	Phoenix Rising FC	4	1	2	0	1	10	10	0	7	
5	USLC	El Paso Locomotive FC	4	1	1	1	1	3	3	0	6	
6	USL1	Union Omaha	4	1	0	0	3	3	5	−2	3	
7	USL1	Texoma FC	4	0	0	1	3	5	12	−7	1	

Updated to match(es) played on July 26, 2025. Source: USL

==== Matches ====
April 26	Texoma FC	0–0 (5–6 p)	El Paso Locomotive FC	Sherman, Texas
7:00 PM CDT		Report		Stadium: Sherman Bearcat Stadium; Attendance: 947; Referee: Jaclyn Metz
	Penalties
	Kilwien (penalty scored); Perkins (penalty missed); Padilla (penalty scored); Asante (penalty scored); Spengler (penalty scored); Ramos (penalty scored); Jawneh (penalty missed)		(penalty missed) Coronado; (penalty scored) Alfaro; (penalty scored) Ruiz; (penalty scored) Cabrera; (penalty scored) Ortíz; (penalty scored) Rodríguez; (penalty scored) Moreno

April 26	New Mexico United	2–0	Union Omaha	Albuquerque, New Mexico
7:00 PM MDT	Maples 42' (pen.); Vargas 90+3'	Report		Stadium: Rio Grande Credit Union Field at Isotopes Park; Attendance: 9,495; Referee: Brandon Stevis

April 26	Phoenix Rising FC	0–1	San Antonio FC	Phoenix, Arizona
7:00 PM MST		Report	Agudelo 63'	Stadium: Phoenix Rising Soccer Stadium; Attendance: 6,515; Referee: Elijio Arreguin

May 31	El Paso Locomotive FC	0–1	Colorado Springs Switchbacks FC	El Paso, Texas
7:00 PM MDT		Report	Huerman 35'	Stadium: Southwest University Park; Attendance: 5,845; Referee: Muhammad Hassan

May 31	Phoenix Rising FC	3–3 (3–2 p)	New Mexico United	Phoenix, Arizona
7:00 PM MST	Sacko 40' (pen.); Avayevu 45+2'; Scearce 70'	Report	Akale 14'; Fernando 57'; Gaines 63'	Stadium: Phoenix Rising Soccer Stadium; Attendance: 4,122; Referee: John Griggs
	Penalties
	Scearce (penalty scored); Dennis (penalty scored); Formella (penalty missed); Margaritha (penalty missed); Sacko (penalty scored)		(penalty missed) Bruce; (penalty missed) Maples; (penalty missed) Pondeca; (penalty scored) Seymore; (penalty scored) Ryden

June 25	Colorado Springs Switchbacks FC	0–2	San Antonio FC	Colorado Springs, Colorado
7:00 PM MDT		Report	Parades 63', 89'	Stadium: Weidner Field; Attendance: 5,500; Referee: Trevor Wiseman

June 28	New Mexico United	2–2 (3–2 p)	Colorado Springs Switchbacks FC	Albuquerque, New Mexico
7:00 PM MDT	Amang 24'; Maples 34' (pen.)	Report	Tejada 28'; Fontana 65'	Stadium: Rio Grande Credit Union Field at Isotopes Park; Attendance: 10,747; Referee: Nabil Bensalah
	Penalties
	Fernando (penalty missed); Jabang (penalty scored); Maples (penalty scored); Gloster (penalty scored)		(penalty missed) Adams; (penalty scored) Huerman; (penalty scored) Lacroix; (penalty missed) Zandi; (penalty missed) Mahoney

June 28	San Antonio FC	1–0	Union Omaha	San Antonio, Texas
8:00 PM CDT	LaCava 9'	Report		Stadium: Toyota Field; Attendance: 6,183; Referee: Cristian Campo

June 28	Texoma FC	4–5	Phoenix Rising FC	Sherman, Texas
7:30 PM CDT	McManus 7'; Pepi 26', 41'; Jawneh 68'	Report	Dennis 21' (pen.), 52', 71' (pen.); Johnson 24'; Cuello 90+6'	Stadium: Sherman Bearcat Stadium; Attendance: 1,045; Referee: Corbyn May

July 19	El Paso Locomotive FC	2–2 (6–7 p)	Phoenix Rising FC	El Paso, Texas
7:00 PM MDT	Torres 11'; Cabrera 38'	Report	Twumasi 6' (o.g.); Johnson 80'	Stadium: Southwest University Park; Attendance: 5,416; Referee: Matthew Thompson
	Penalties
	Ortiz (penalty scored); Torres (penalty scored); Rodríguez (penalty missed); Ruiz (penalty scored); Vazquez (penalty scored); Romero (penalty scored); Daroma (penalty scored); Avila (penalty missed)		(penalty scored) Dennis; (penalty scored) Cuello; (penalty missed) Boye; (penalty scored) Margaritha; (penalty scored) Sacko; (penalty scored) Hernandez; (penalty scored) Emmers; (penalty scored) Flood

July 23	Union Omaha	3–1	Texoma FC	Papillion, Nebraska
7:00 PM CDT	Botello-Faz 20'; Becher 44'; Ors 51'	Report	Holt 35' (o.g.)	Stadium: Werner Park; Attendance: 1,849; Referee: Trevor Wiseman

July 26	Union Omaha	0–1	El Paso Locomotive FC	Papillion, Nebraska
7:00 PM CDT		Report	Avila 39'	Stadium: Werner Park; Attendance: 2,176; Referee: Amin Hadzic

July 26	San Antonio FC	2–2 (0–3 p)	New Mexico United	San Antonio, Texas
8:00 PM CDT	Agudelo 8', 51'	Report	Noël 90+2'; Harris 90+9'	Stadium: Toyota Field; Attendance: 6,092; Referee: Matthew Corrigan
	Penalties
	Hernández (penalty missed); Taintor (penalty missed); Neville (penalty missed)		(penalty scored) Hurst; (penalty scored) Akale; (penalty scored) Maples

July 26	Colorado Springs Switchbacks FC	4–0	Texoma FC	Colorado Springs, Colorado
7:00 PM MDT	Tejada 37'; Huerman 51', 90+3'; Clegg 79'	Report		Stadium: Weidner Field; Attendance: 7,329; Referee: Benjamin Meyer

=== Group 3 ===
Pos	Lg	Team	Pld	W	PKW	PKL	L	GF	GA	GD	Pts	Qualification
1	USLC	Indy Eleven	4	3	1	0	0	8	2	+6	11	Advance to knockout stage
2	USLC	Birmingham Legion FC	4	3	0	1	0	8	4	+4	10	Advance to knockout stage (wild card)
3	USL1	Chattanooga Red Wolves SC	4	1	1	0	2	4	8	−4	5	
4	USLC	FC Tulsa	4	1	0	1	2	8	7	+1	4	
5	USL1	Forward Madison FC	4	1	0	1	2	3	7	−4	4	
6	USL1	One Knoxville SC	4	0	1	0	3	2	5	−3	2	

Updated to match(es) played on July 26, 2025. Source: USL

==== Matches ====
April 26	Forward Madison FC	0–4	Indy Eleven	Madison, Wisconsin
6:00 PM CDT		Report	Quinn 69'; Blake 72'; Amoh 84', 90+3'	Stadium: Breese Stevens Field; Attendance: 3,748; Referee: Muhammad Hassan

April 26	One Knoxville SC	2–2 (4–2 p)	FC Tulsa	Knoxville, Tennessee
7:00 PM EDT	Gøling 34'; Tekiela 72' (pen.)	Report	Calheira 2'; Toure 90+5'	Stadium: Covenant Health Park; Attendance: 6,378; Referee: Edson Carvajal
	Penalties
	Tekiela (penalty scored); Johnson (penalty scored); Caputo (penalty scored); Fernandez (penalty scored)		(penalty missed) Cissoko; (penalty missed) Diallo; (penalty scored) Rogers; (penalty scored) Webber

April 27	Birmingham Legion FC	3–1	Chattanooga Red Wolves SC	Birmingham, Alabama
4:00 PM CDT	Trejo 10'; Tabort Etaka 71'; Damus 79'	Report	Kinzner 90+4'	Stadium: Protective Stadium; Attendance: 4,509; Referee: Elton Garcia

May 24	One Knoxville SC	0–1	Indy Eleven	Knoxville, Tennessee
7:00 PM EDT		Report	Amoh 47'	Stadium: Covenant Health Park; Attendance: 2,925; Referee: Muhammad Kaleia

May 31	Chattanooga Red Wolves SC	1–1 (4–2 p)	Forward Madison FC	East Ridge, Tennessee
7:00 PM EDT	Bentley 2'	Report	Boyce 71' (pen.)	Stadium: CHI Memorial Stadium; Attendance: 2,054; Referee: Edson Carvajal
	Penalties
	Bentley (penalty scored); Wessels (penalty scored); Vazquez (penalty scored); Ramos (penalty scored)		(penalty scored) Carrera-García; (penalty missed) Viader; (penalty scored) Boyce; (penalty missed) Murphy

May 31	FC Tulsa	1–2	Birmingham Legion FC	Tulsa, Oklahoma
7:30 PM CDT	ElMedkhar 62'	Report	Damus 59' (pen.); Tregarthen 68'	Stadium: Oneok Field; Attendance: 4,467; Referee: Benjamin Meyer

June 28	FC Tulsa	4–1	Chattanooga Red Wolves SC	Tulsa, Oklahoma
7:30 PM CDT	Calheira 20'; Webber 36'; Lukic 51'; Damm 62'	Report	Knapp 12'	Stadium: Oneok Field; Attendance: 3,056; Referee: Matthew Thompson

June 28	Forward Madison FC	1–0	One Knoxville SC	Madison, Wisconsin
6:00 PM CDT	McLaughlin 44' (pen.)	Report		Stadium: Breese Stevens Field; Attendance: 4,723; Referee: Lauren Aldrich

June 28	Indy Eleven	1–1 (7–6 p)	Birmingham Legion FC	Indianapolis, Indiana
7:00 PM EDT	O'Brien 28'	Report	Preston 90+4'	Stadium: Michael A. Carroll Stadium; Attendance: 9,028; Referee: Brad Jensen
	Penalties
	Williams (penalty missed); Blake (penalty scored); Lindley (penalty scored); Quinn (penalty scored); McRobb (penalty scored); Rendón (penalty scored); Collier (penalty scored); O'Brien (penalty scored)		(penalty scored) Pasher; (penalty scored) Laszo; (penalty scored) Hernandez-Foster; (penalty scored) Preston; (penalty missed) Damus; (penalty scored) Suárez; (penalty scored) McIllhatton; (penalty missed) Centeno

July 26	Birmingham Legion FC	2–1	Forward Madison FC	Birmingham, Alabama
7:00 PM CDT	Damus 30'; Saucedo 81'	Report	Angking 71'	Stadium: Protective Stadium; Attendance: 4,626; Referee: Elijio Arreguin

July 26	Chattanooga Red Wolves SC	1–0	One Knoxville SC	East Ridge, Tennessee
7:00 PM EDT	Jnohope 66'	Report		Stadium: CHI Memorial Stadium; Attendance: 2,051; Referee: Carlos Rodriguez

July 26	Indy Eleven	2–1	FC Tulsa	Indianapolis, Indiana
7:00 PM EDT	Williams 38'; Batista 51' (o.g.)	Report	Colli 72'	Stadium: Michael A. Carroll Stadium; Attendance: 9,065; Referee: Gerald Flores

=== Group 4 ===
Pos	Lg	Team	Pld	W	PKW	PKL	L	GF	GA	GD	Pts	Qualification
1	USLC	Rhode Island FC	4	3	0	1	0	11	4	+7	10	Advance to knockout stage
2	USLC	Hartford Athletic	4	2	1	1	0	9	6	+3	9	Advance to knockout stage (wild card)
3	USLC	Detroit City FC	4	2	1	0	1	8	6	+2	8	
4	USL1	Portland Hearts of Pine	4	1	1	0	2	7	10	−3	5	
5	USLC	Pittsburgh Riverhounds SC	4	1	0	1	2	3	4	−1	4	
6	USL1	Westchester SC	4	0	0	0	4	3	11	−8	0	

Updated to match(es) played on July 26, 2025. Source: USL

==== Matches ====
April 26	Detroit City FC	1–0	Pittsburgh Riverhounds SC	Hamtramck, Michigan
4:00 PM EDT	Smith 90+1'	Report		Stadium: Keyworth Stadium; Attendance: 5,716; Referee: Matthew Corrigan

April 26	Hartford Athletic	2–0	Portland Hearts of Pine	Hartford, Connecticut
4:00 PM EDT	Panayotou 41', 64'	Report		Stadium: Trinity Health Stadium; Attendance: 3,878; Referee: Ricardo Montero Araya

April 27	Westchester SC	1–4	Rhode Island FC	Mount Vernon, New York
2:00 PM EDT	Bolanos 85'	Report	Nodarse 25'; Williams 28', 65'; Rodriguez 37'	Stadium: The Stadium at Memorial Field; Attendance: 2,783; Referee: Joe Surgan

May 31	Westchester SC	2–3	Hartford Athletic	Mount Vernon, New York
4:00 PM EDT	Obregón 24' (pen.), 56' (pen.)	Report	Careaga 51', 75'; Dieng 88'	Stadium: The Stadium at Memorial Field; Attendance: 1,653; Referee: Drew Klemp

May 31	Portland Hearts of Pine	4–2	Detroit City FC	Portland, Maine
5:00 PM EDT	Liadi 5'; Wright 28'; Varela 79'; Mohamed 85'	Report	Guenzatti 52'; Smith 81'	Stadium: Fitzpatrick Stadium; Attendance: 5,651; Referee: Luis Arroyo

May 31	Pittsburgh Riverhounds SC	0–1	Rhode Island FC	Pittsburgh, Pennsylvania
7:00 PM EDT		Report	Kwizera 19'	Stadium: Highmark Stadium; Attendance: 5,074; Referee: John Matto

June 27	Rhode Island FC	4–1	Portland Hearts of Pine	Pawtucket, Rhode Island
7:00 PM EDT	Dikwa 18', 50', 58'; Fuson 85'	Report	Washington 63'	Stadium: Tidewater Landing Stadium; Attendance: 7,502; Referee: Muhammad Hassan

June 28	Hartford Athletic	2–2 (2–3 p)	Detroit City FC	Hartford, Connecticut
7:00 PM EDT	Anderson 2'; Ngalina 28'	Report	Sheldon 16', 90'	Stadium: Trinity Health Stadium; Attendance: 5,271; Referee: Rodrigo Albuquerque
	Penalties
	Ngalina (penalty missed); Anderson (penalty missed); Dieng (penalty scored); Farrell (penalty scored); Diz (penalty missed)		(penalty missed) Diouf; (penalty missed) Rutz; (penalty scored) Guenzatti; (penalty scored) Yamazaki; (penalty scored) Bryant

June 28	Pittsburgh Riverhounds SC	1–0	Westchester SC	Pittsburgh, Pennsylvania
7:00 PM EDT	Jacquesson 15'	Report		Stadium: Highmark Stadium; Attendance: 4,752; Referee: Marie Durr

July 25	Portland Hearts of Pine	2–2 (5–4 p)	Pittsburgh Riverhounds SC	Portland, Maine
6:30 PM EDT	Washington 64'; O. Wright 72'	Report	Jacquesson 71' 75' (pen.)	Stadium: Fitzpatrick Stadium; Attendance: 5,651; Referee: Edson Carvajal
	Penalties
	O. Wright (penalty scored); Kamara (penalty scored); Wada (penalty scored); Washington (penalty scored); Langlois (penalty scored)		(penalty scored) Broughton; (penalty missed) Garcia; (penalty scored) Ahl; (penalty scored) Griffin; (penalty scored) Suber

July 26	Detroit City FC	3–0	Westchester SC	Hamtramck, Michigan
7:00 PM EDT	Diouf 45+3' (pen.); Amoo-Mensah 71'; Sheldon 89'	Report		Stadium: Keyworth Stadium; Attendance: 6,954

July 26	Rhode Island FC	2–2 (3–4 p)	Hartford Athletic	Pawtucket, Rhode Island
7:00 PM EDT	Shapiro-Thompson 49'; Rodriguez 79' (pen.)	Report	Presthus 45+3'; Diz 83'	Stadium: Tidewater Landing Stadium; Attendance: 7,242; Referee: Brandon Stevis
	Penalties
	Rodriguez (penalty scored); Fuson (penalty scored); Ybarra (penalty missed); Dikwa (penalty scored); Sanchez (penalty scored)		(penalty scored) Farrell; (penalty scored) Diz; (penalty scored) Dieng; (penalty scored) Edwards

=== Group 5 ===
Pos	Lg	Team	Pld	W	PKW	PKL	L	GF	GA	GD	Pts	Qualification
1	USLC	Loudoun United FC	4	2	1	1	0	5	3	+2	9	Advance to knockout stage
2	USL1	Charlotte Independence	4	2	1	1	0	8	4	+4	9	
3	USLC	Louisville City FC	4	3	0	0	1	8	4	+4	9	
4	USLC	Lexington SC	4	1	0	1	2	6	5	+1	4	
5	USLC	North Carolina FC	4	1	1	0	2	3	4	−1	5	
6	USL1	Richmond Kickers	4	0	0	0	4	1	11	−10	0	

Updated to match(es) played on July 26, 2025. Source: USL

==== Matches ====
April 25	North Carolina FC	1–2	Charlotte Independence	Cary, North Carolina
7:00 PM EDT	Anderson 27'	Report	Chaney 10'; Álvarez 25' (pen.)	Stadium: First Horizon Stadium at WakeMed Soccer Park; Attendance: 2,428; Referee: Mark Verso

April 26	Lexington SC	0–1	Loudoun United FC	Lexington, Kentucky
6:00 PM EDT		Report	Erlandson 90+6'	Stadium: Lexington SC Stadium; Attendance: 3,417; Referee: Alyssa Nichols

April 26	Louisville City FC	4–1	Richmond Kickers	Louisville, Kentucky
7:30 PM EDT	M. Perez 45+3'; Serrano 55'; Gleadle 62'; A. Perez 87'	Report	Seufert 58'	Stadium: Lynn Family Stadium; Attendance: 8,922; Referee: Drew Klemp

May 31	Loudoun United FC	2–1	Louisville City FC	Leesburg, Virginia
6:00 PM EDT	Aboukoura 14'; Ryan 59'	Report	Pérez 20'	Stadium: Segra Field; Attendance: 1,583; Referee: Thomas Snyder

May 31	Charlotte Independence	2–2 (4–2 p)	Lexington SC	Charlotte, North Carolina
7:00 PM EDT	Chaney 55', 90+3'	Report	Adedokun 18'; Burke 50'	Stadium: American Legion Memorial Stadium; Attendance: 1,809; Referee: Gerald Flores
	Penalties
	Chaney (penalty missed); Spielman (penalty scored); Álvarez (penalty scored); Moreno (penalty scored); Bakero (penalty scored)		(penalty missed) Goldthorp; (penalty scored) Mbongue; (penalty scored) Gibert; (penalty missed) Epps

May 31	Richmond Kickers	0–1	North Carolina FC	Richmond, Virginia
7:00 PM EDT		Report	Luckhurst 81'	Stadium: City Stadium; Attendance: 4,753; Referee: Alex Beehler

June 28	Loudoun United FC	1–1 (4–3 p)	Charlotte Independence	Leesburg, Virginia
6:00 PM EDT	Aboukoura 63'	Report	Marou 73'	Stadium: Segra Field; Attendance: 1,029; Referee: Elvis Osmanovic
	Penalties
	Tingey (penalty missed); Aboukoura (penalty scored); Mines (penalty scored); Turner (penalty scored); Leerman (penalty scored)		(penalty scored) Fonseca; (penalty scored) Spielman; (penalty missed) Ngah; (penalty scored) Chaney; (penalty missed) Marou

June 28	Richmond Kickers	0–3	Lexington SC	Richmond, Virginia
7:00 PM EDT		Report	Ajago 10'; Epps 31'; Burke 90'	Stadium: City Stadium; Attendance: 3,290; Referee: John Griggs

June 29	Louisville City FC	1–0	North Carolina FC	Louisville, Kentucky
8:00 PM EDT	Wilson 10'	Report		Stadium: Lynn Family Stadium; Attendance: 7,002; Referee: Jeremy Scheer
Note: Match moved from June 28 to June 29 to accommodate travel issues experienced by North Carolina FC.

July 25	North Carolina FC	1–1 (5–3 p)	Loudoun United FC	Cary, North Carolina
7:30 PM EDT	Perez 90+13'	Report	Bidois 36'	Stadium: First Horizon Stadium at WakeMed Soccer Park; Attendance: 1,602; Referee: John Matto
	Penalties
	Perez (penalty scored); Mentzingen (penalty scored); Maldonado (penalty scored); Dolabella (penalty scored); Conway (penalty scored)		(penalty scored) Tingey; (penalty missed) Mines; (penalty scored) Nagy; (penalty scored) Skundrich

July 26	Charlotte Independence	3–0	Richmond Kickers	Charlotte, North Carolina
7:00 PM EDT	Jauregui 11'; Moshobane 51'; Ousmanou 90+5'	Report		Stadium: American Legion Memorial Stadium; Attendance: 628; Referee: Luis Arroyo

July 26	Lexington SC	1–2	Louisville City FC	Lexington, Kentucky
7:00 PM EDT	Greene 87'	Report	Morris 90+1', 90+7'	Stadium: Lexington SC Stadium; Attendance: 8,252; Referee: Corbyn May

=== Group 6 ===
Pos	Lg	Team	Pld	W	PKW	PKL	L	GF	GA	GD	Pts	Qualification
1	USL1	Greenville Triumph SC	4	3	0	0	1	6	3	+3	9	Advance to knockout stage
2	USLC	Tampa Bay Rowdies	4	2	0	1	1	8	6	+2	7	
3	USL1	South Georgia Tormenta FC	4	2	0	1	1	8	7	+1	7	
4	USLC	Miami FC	4	1	1	0	2	7	9	−2	5	
5	USLC	Charleston Battery	4	1	1	0	2	5	6	−1	5	
6	USL1	FC Naples	4	1	0	0	3	4	7	−3	3	

Updated to match(es) played on July 26, 2025. Source: USL

==== Matches ====
April 26	FC Naples	1–0	Charleston Battery	Naples, Florida
7:00 PM EDT	Henderlong 18'	Report		Stadium: Paradise Coast Sports Complex Stadium; Attendance: 4,172; Referee: Atahan Yaya

April 26	South Georgia Tormenta FC	2–1	Greenville Triumph SC	Statesboro, Georgia
7:30 PM EDT	Tunbridge 22', 45+4'	Report	Robles 86'	Stadium: Optim Sports Medicine Field at Tormenta Stadium; Attendance: 1,146; Referee: Deny Kulasinac

April 26	Tampa Bay Rowdies	3–3 (3–4 p)	Miami FC	St. Petersburg, Florida
7:30 PM EDT	Pacius 8'; Castellanos 28'; Arteaga 32'	Report	Blanco 57' (pen.); Zárate 60'; Melano 77'	Stadium: Al Lang Stadium; Attendance: 5,103; Referee: Benjamin Meyer
	Penalties
	Bassett (penalty scored); Arteaga (penalty scored); Fernandes (penalty scored); Crisostomo (penalty missed); Mustali (penalty missed); Worth (penalty missed)		(penalty missed) Akinyode; (penalty scored) Lawrence; (penalty scored) Gavilanes; (penalty scored) Celeste; (penalty missed) Cardona; (penalty scored) Hoyos

May 31	Charleston Battery	0–1	Greenville Triumph SC	Mount Pleasant, South Carolina
6:00 PM EDT		Report	Zakowski 44'	Stadium: Patriots Point Soccer Complex; Attendance: 3,701; Referee: Marie Durr

May 31	Miami FC	3–2	FC Naples	University Park, Florida
7:30 PM EDT	Ricketts 36'; Mercado 50'; Lawrence 76'	Report	O'Connor 44'; Cisneros 47'	Stadium: South Dade Kia Field at Pitbull Stadium; Attendance: 1,208; Referee: Greg Dopka

May 31	Tampa Bay Rowdies	2–1	South Georgia Tormenta FC	St. Petersburg, Florida
7:30 PM EDT	Pacius 79'; Bassett 90+4'	Report	Vivas 28'	Stadium: Al Lang Stadium; Attendance: 3,789; Referee: Atahan Yaya

June 28	Greenville Triumph SC	2–0	Miami FC	Greenville, South Carolina
7:00 PM EDT	Robles 46'; Anguiano 85'	Report		Stadium: Paladin Stadium; Attendance: 2,085; Referee: Edson Carvajal

June 28	South Georgia Tormenta FC	3–3 (4–5 p)	Charleston Battery	Statesboro, Georgia
7:30 PM EDT	Cabral 44'; Vivas 83'; Reid-Stephen 90+4'	Report	Archer 8'; Jennings 58'; Ycaza 64'	Stadium: Optim Sports Medicine Field at Tormenta Stadium; Attendance: 876; Referee: Gerald Flores
	Penalties
	Nyandjo (penalty scored); Bwana (penalty scored); Walker (penalty scored); Jiménez (penalty scored); Alves (penalty missed)		(penalty scored) Conway; (penalty scored) Rodríguez; (penalty scored) Myers; (penalty scored) Ycaza; (penalty scored) Kelly

July 4	FC Naples	0–2	Tampa Bay Rowdies	Naples, Florida
8:00 PM EDT		Report	Pacius 38'; Arteaga 60'	Stadium: Paradise Coast Sports Complex Stadium; Attendance: 3,472; Referee: Calin Radosav

July 26	Charleston Battery	2–1	Tampa Bay Rowdies	Mount Pleasant, South Carolina
7:30 PM EDT	Castellanos 45+4' (o.g.); Myers 71'	Report	Skinner 90+1'	Stadium: Patriots Point Soccer Complex; Attendance: 3,599; Referee: Thomas Snyder

July 26	Greenville Triumph SC	2–1	FC Naples	Greenville, South Carolina
7:00 PM EDT	Castro 45+7'; Marsh 67'	Report	Pasnik 2'	Stadium: Paladin Stadium; Attendance: 1,265; Referee: Muhammad Hassan

July 26	Miami FC	1–2	South Georgia Tormenta FC	University Park, Florida
7:00 PM EDT	Hoyos 41'	Report	Tunbridge 54'; Doyle 60'	Stadium: South Dade Kia Field at Pitbull Stadium; Attendance: 1,024; Referee: Jeremy Scheer

=== Wild card ===
==== Tiebreakers ====
The ranking of teams for the knockout stage wild card is determined as follows:

1. Total points obtained;
2. Number of goals scored in group play;
3. Points obtained in matches played between the teams in question;
4. Total regulation wins in group play;
5. Fewest goals against in group play;
6. Fewest number of disciplinary points;
7. Coin toss.

==== Ranking of non-group leading teams ====
Only teams second in points in their group (or tied for second) are included in this table.

Pos	Grp	Team	Pld	W	PKW	PKL	L	GF	GA	GD	Pts	Qualification
1	3	Birmingham Legion FC	4	3	0	1	0	8	4	+4	10	Advance to knockout stage
2	4	Hartford Athletic	4	2	1	1	0	9	6	+3	9	Advance to knockout stage
3	5	Louisville City FC	4	3	0	0	1	8	4	+4	9	
4	5	Charlotte Independence	4	2	1	1	0	8	4	+4	9	
5	1	Las Vegas Lights FC	4	3	0	0	1	7	6	+1	9	
6	2	New Mexico United	4	1	2	1	0	9	7	+2	8	
7	6	South Georgia Tormenta FC	4	2	0	1	1	8	7	+1	7	
8	6	Tampa Bay Rowdies	4	2	0	1	1	8	6	+2	7	

Updated to match(es) played on July 26, 2025. Source: USL

== Knockout stage ==
Number of teams per tier still in competition
Championship	League 1	Total
7 / 24	1 / 14	8 / 38

=== Quarterfinals ===
August 20	Indy Eleven	1–1 (5–6 p)	Greenville Triumph SC	Indianapolis, Indiana
7:00 PM EDT	Williams 55'	Report	Quinn 90' (o.g.)	Stadium: Michael A. Carroll Stadium; Attendance: 4,043; Referee: Elvis Osmanovic
	Penalties
	Foster (penalty scored); Amoh (penalty scored); Hogan (penalty scored); Ofeimu (penalty scored); Quinn (penalty scored); Brynéus (penalty missed)		(penalty scored) Evans; (penalty scored) Fricke; (penalty scored) Herrera; (penalty scored) Zakowski; (penalty scored) Patti; (penalty scored) Soto

August 20	Rhode Island FC	1–0	Birmingham Legion FC	Pawtucket, Rhode Island
7:00 PM EDT	Atkinson 74'	Report		Stadium: Centreville Bank Stadium; Attendance: 3,703; Referee: Brad Jensen

August 20	San Antonio FC	0–2	Hartford Athletic	San Antonio, Texas
7:30 PM CDT		Report	Dieng 36'; Hairston 58'	Stadium: Toyota Field; Attendance: 4,789; Referee: Natalie Simon

August 20	Loudoun United FC	0–0 (2–4 p)	Sacramento Republic FC	Leesburg, Virginia
7:00 PM EDT		Report		Stadium: Segra Field; Attendance: 1,057; Referee: Abdou Ndiaye
	Penalties
	Tingey (penalty scored); Aboukoura (penalty missed); Ryan (penalty missed); Glasgow (penalty scored)		(penalty missed) Bennett; (penalty scored) Ross; (penalty scored) Edwards; (penalty scored) Benítez; (penalty scored) Parano

=== Semi-finals ===
September 10	Rhode Island FC	0–0 (0–3 p)	Sacramento Republic FC	Pawtucket, Rhode Island
7:00 PM EDT		Report		Stadium: Centreville Bank Stadium; Attendance: 4,899; Referee: Greg Dopka
	Penalties
	Rodriguez (penalty missed); Williams (penalty missed); Fuson (penalty missed)		(penalty scored) López; (penalty scored) Cicerone; (penalty scored) Benítez

September 10	Hartford Athletic	3–1	Greenville Triumph SC	Hartford, Connecticut
7:30 PM EDT	Farrell 70'; Hairston 85'; Ngalina 90+3'	Report	Lee 74'	Stadium: Trinity Health Stadium; Attendance: 2,000; Referee: Alyssa Pennington

=== Final ===
October 4	Sacramento Republic FC	0–1	Hartford Athletic	Sacramento, California
10:00 PM EDT		Report	Careaga 51'	Stadium: Heart Health Park; Attendance: 11,569; Referee: Matthew Corrigan

== Statistics ==
As of September 10, 2025.

All statistics include both the group stage and knockout stage.

=== Top goalscorers ===
Goals scored in penalty shoot-outs are not counted towards players' goal counts or to match goal counts.

Team eliminated for this round.

Rank	Player	Team	Goals	By round						
Rank	Player	Team	Goals	M1	M2	M3	M4	QF	SF	F
1	(United States) Juan Agudelo	San Antonio FC	3	1	0	0	2	0		
1	(Ghana) Elvis Amoh	Indy Eleven	3	2	1	0	0	0		
1	(Argentina) Samuel Careaga	Hartford Athletic	3	0	2	0	0	0	0	1
1	(United States) Christian Chaney	Charlotte Independence	3	1	2	0	0			
1	(Haiti) Ronaldo Damus	Birmingham Legion FC	3	1	1	0	1	0		
1	(England) Charlie Dennis	Phoenix Rising FC	3	0	0	3	0			
1	(Cameroon) Albert Dikwa	Rhode Island FC	3	0	0	3	0	0	0	
1	(France) Quenzi Huerman	Colorado Springs Switchbacks FC	3	1	0	0	2			
1	(France) Bertin Jacquesson	Pittsburgh Riverhounds SC	3	0	0	1	2			
1	(Haiti) Woobens Pacius	Tampa Bay Rowdies	3	1	1	1	0			
1	(United States) Matthew Sheldon	Detroit City FC	3	0	0	2	1			
1	(England) Mason Tunbridge	South Georgia Tormenta FC	3	2	0	0	1			

=== Most clean sheets ===
Goals allowed in penalty shoot-outs are not counted towards players' clean sheet totals.

Team eliminated for this round.

Rank	Player	Team	Shutouts	By round						
Rank	Player	Team	Shutouts	M1	M2	M3	M4	QF	SF	F
1	(United States) Jared Mazzola	Sacramento Republic FC	5	✓	✓		✓	✓	✓	
2	(France) Hugo Fauroux	Loudoun United FC	2	✓				✓		
2	(Japan) Tetsuya Kadono	Orange County SC	2			✓	✓			
2	(United States) Daniel Namani	San Antonio FC	2	✓	✓					
2	(Mexico) Carlos Saldaña	Detroit City FC	2	✓			✓			
2	(Cameroon) Antony Siaha	Hartford Athletic	2	✓				✓		
7	22 players		1							

=== Average home attendances ===
Ranked from highest to lowest average attendance.

Team	League	GP	Total	High	Low	Average
New Mexico United	USLC	2	20,242	10,747	9,495	10,121
Sacramento Republic FC	USLC	3	29,904	11,569	8,898	10,968
Louisville City FC	USLC	2	15,924	8,922	7,002	7,962
Indy Eleven	USLC	3	22,136	9,065	4,043	7,379
Colorado Springs Switchbacks FC	USLC	2	12,829	7,329	5,500	6,415
Detroit City FC	USLC	2	12,670	6,954	5,716	6,335
Rhode Island FC	USLC	4	23,346	7,502	3,703	5,837
Lexington SC	USLC	2	11,669	8,252	3,417	5,835
San Antonio FC	USLC	3	17,064	6,183	4,789	5,688
Portland Hearts of Pine	USL1	2	11,302	5,651	5,651	5,651
El Paso Locomotive FC	USLC	2	11,261	5,845	5,416	5,631
Phoenix Rising FC	USLC	2	10,637	6,515	4,122	5,319
Oakland Roots SC	USLC	2	10,375	5,418	4,957	5,188
Pittsburgh Riverhounds SC	USLC	2	9,826	5,074	4,752	4,913
One Knoxville SC	USL1	2	9,303	6,378	2,925	4,652
Birmingham Legion FC	USLC	2	9,135	4,626	4,509	4,568
Tampa Bay Rowdies	USLC	2	8,892	5,103	3,789	4,446
Forward Madison FC	USL1	2	8,471	4,723	3,748	4,236
AV Alta FC	USL1	2	8,359	4,408	3,951	4,180
Richmond Kickers	USL1	2	8,043	4,753	3,290	4,022
Orange County SC	USLC	2	7,678	4,328	3,350	3,839
FC Naples	USL1	2	7,644	4,172	3,472	3,822
FC Tulsa	USLC	2	7,523	4,467	3,056	3,762
Hartford Athletic	USLC	3	11,149	5,271	2,000	3,716
Charleston Battery	USLC	2	7,300	3,701	3,599	3,650
Spokane Velocity FC	USL1	2	5,273	3,068	2,205	2,637
Monterey Bay FC	USLC	2	5,020	3,006	2,014	2,510
Westchester SC	USL1	2	4,436	2,783	1,653	2,218
Las Vegas Lights FC	USLC	2	4,392	2,597	1,795	2,196
Chattanooga Red Wolves SC	USL1	2	4,105	2,054	2,051	2,053
North Carolina FC	USLC	2	4,030	2,428	1,602	2,015
Union Omaha	USL1	2	4,025	2,176	1,849	2,013
Greenville Triumph SC	USL1	2	3,350	2,085	1,265	1,675
Loudoun United FC	USLC	3	3,669	1,583	1,029	1,223
Charlotte Independence	USL1	2	2,437	1,809	628	1,219
Miami FC	USLC	2	2,232	1,208	1,024	1,116
Tormenta FC	USL1	2	2,022	1,146	876	1,011
Texoma FC	USL1	2	1,992	1,045	947	996
Total	combined	83	359,665	11,569	628	4,333

=== Average home attendances by league ===
League	GP	Total	High	Low	Average
USL Championship	45	278,903	11,569	1,024	6,198
USL League One	38	80,762	6,378	628	2,125
Total	83	359,665	11,569	628	4,333

== Awards ==
=== Player of the Round ===
Round	Position	Player	Club	Reason	Ref.
1	MF	(United States) Christian Pinzón	Las Vegas Lights FC	2 goal, 1 assist vs. Orange County SC	
2	MF	(Argentina) Samuel Careaga	Hartford Athletic	2 goals vs. Westchester SC	
3	MF	(England) Charlie Dennis	Phoenix Rising FC	Hat Trick vs. Texoma FC	
4	DF	(United States) Jake Morris	Louisville City FC	2 goals in Stoppage Time vs. Lexington SC	

=== Goal of the Round ===
Round	Player	Club	Opponent	Ref.
1	(Germany) Nils Seufert	Richmond Kickers	Louisville City FC	
2	(Argentina) Diego Mercado	Miami FC	FC Naples	
3	(Brazil) Gabriel Cabral	South Georgia Tormenta FC	Charleston Battery	
4	(United States) Adam Aoumaich	AV Alta FC	Monterey Bay FC	

=== Save of the Round ===
Round	Player	Club	Opponent	Ref.
1	(Ghana) Rashid Nuhu	Union Omaha	New Mexico United	
2	(France) Hugo Fauroux	Loudoun United FC	Louisville City FC	
3	(United States) Hunter Sulte	Indy Eleven	Birmingham Legion FC	
4	(Puerto Rico) Joel Serrano	FC Naples	Greenville Triumph SC	

=== Team of the Round ===
Player of the Round denoted in Bold.

Round	Goalkeeper	Defenders	Midfielders	Forwards	Bench	Coach	Ref.
1	(Ghana) Nuhu (OMA)	(United States) Lindsey (NMU) (United States) Maples (NMU) (Cuba) Nodarse (RI)	(Honduras) Álvarez (CLT) (United States) Davila (LOU) (United States) **Pinzón** (LVL) (United States) Rodriguez (RI) (Mexico) Trejo (BHM)	(Scotland) Blake (IND) (United States) Williams (RI)	(Cuba) Arozarena (LVL) (Georgia (country)) Margvelashvili (OAK) (United States) Panayotou (HFD) (Barbados) Niall Reid-Stephen (SGT) (England) Tunbridge (SGT) (Ghana) Amoh (IND) (United States) Henderlong (NAP)	(United States) Fuller (KNX)	
2	(United States) Rankenburg (GVL)	(United States) Smart (LVL) (Spain) Garcia (SPK) (Canada) Doner (OAK)	(United States) Paul (MB) (Sierra Leone) Kamara (POR) (Argentina) **Careaga** (HFD) (Ghana) Avayevu (PHX)	(Honduras) Obregón (WES) (United States) Chaney (CLT) (Argentina) Bonfiglio (MIA)	(United States) Mazzola (SAC) (United States Virgin Islands) Ramos (CHA) (Republic of Ireland) Desmond (SAC) (Argentina) Mercado (MIA) (Egypt) Aboukoura (LDN) (Trinidad and Tobago) James (POR) (Sweden) Larsson (MB)	(United States) Murphy (POR)	
3	(United States) Torman (GVL)	(Colombia) Medranda (SAN) (United States) Sanchez (RI) (England) Sims (GVL)	(England) **Dennis** (PHX) (United States) Fuson (RI) (United States) Sheldon (DET) (Honduras) Midence (LEX)	(United States) Calheira (TUL) (Cameroon) Dikwa (RI) (United States) Pepi (TXO)	(United States) Sulte (IND) (United States) Guimaraes (OCO) (Austria) Crull (MAD) (Mexico) Rodríguez (CHS) (Barbados) Niall Reid-Stephen (SGT) (Colombia) Paredes (SAN) (United States) McManus (TXO)	(United States) Llamosa (SAN)	
4	(Guatemala) Jérez (CHA)	(United States) Amoo-Mensah (DET) (United States) **Morris** (LOU) (United States) Ortiz (AVA)	(United States) Jauregui (CLT) (Ecuador) Cedeño (DET) (Brazil) Torres (ELP) (Spain) Robles (GVL)	(France) Huerman (COS) (France) Jacquesson (PGH) (England) Tunbridge (SGT)	(Japan) Kadono (OCO) (United States) Clegg (COS) (Cameroon) Ngah (CLT) (Jamaica) Marsh (GVL) (United States) Bodily (TBR) (United States) Agudelo (SAN) (Senegal) Diouf (DET)	(Scotland) Cameron (SGT)	
