= 2025 USL Championship playoffs =

Tournament details
- Country: United States
- Dates: November 1 – November 22
- Teams: 16

Final positions
- Champions: Pittsburgh Riverhounds SC (1st title)
- Runners-up: FC Tulsa

Tournament statistics
- Matches played: 15
- Goals scored: 16 (1.07 per match)
- Attendance: 100,391 (6,693 per match)
- Top goal scorer(s): (Cameroon) Albert Dikwa Rhode Island FC (Serbia) Stefan Lukic FC Tulsa (2 goals each)

The 2025 USL Championship playoffs was the post-season championship of the 2025 USL Championship season. It was the fifteenth edition of the USL Championship playoffs. The playoffs began on the first weekend of November, and concluded with the final in late November.

Colorado Springs Switchbacks FC, the 2024 Western Conference champions, were the defending title holders, winning against the Eastern Conference champion Rhode Island FC.

Pittsburgh Riverhounds SC defeated FC Tulsa in the final 5–3 on penalties to win their first title. In the process, the Riverhounds became the first team to win the USL Championship title without conceding a goal throughout the postseason.

== Format ==
The top eight teams in each conference qualified for the playoffs which was in a single-elimination, fixed bracket format. All playoff matches are streamed live on ESPN+ except the Championship final on CBS. The playoffs are scheduled to begin on the first weekend of November, with the final taking place between the 21st and 23rd.

== Conference standings ==
Eastern Conference

Pos	Team	Pld	Pts
1	Louisville City FC (S)	30	73
2	Charleston Battery	30	62
3	North Carolina FC	30	45
4	Pittsburgh Riverhounds SC (C)	30	44
5	Hartford Athletic	30	44
6	Loudoun United FC	30	42
7	Rhode Island FC	30	38
8	Detroit City FC	30	37
9	Indy Eleven	30	35
10	Tampa Bay Rowdies	30	34
11	Miami FC	30	30
12	Birmingham Legion FC	30	27

Source: USL Championship Standings
(C) Champions; (S) Players' Shield winner

Western Conference

Pos	Team	Pld	Pts
1	FC Tulsa	30	57
2	Sacramento Republic FC	30	48
3	New Mexico United	30	48
4	El Paso Locomotive FC	30	41
5	Phoenix Rising FC	30	40
6	San Antonio FC	30	40
7	Orange County SC	30	39
8	Colorado Springs Switchbacks FC	30	37
9	Lexington SC	30	36
10	Oakland Roots SC	30	32
11	Monterey Bay FC	30	29
12	Las Vegas Lights FC	30	27

Source: USL Championship Standings

== Bracket ==
Conference Quarterfinals; November 1–2	Conference Semifinals; November 8
E1	Louisville City FC	0
E8	Detroit City FC	1
E8	Detroit City FC	0 (3)
E4	Pittsburgh Riverhounds SC	0 (4)
E4	Pittsburgh Riverhounds SC (p)	0 (4)
E5	Hartford Athletic	0 (2)
Eastern Conference
E3	North Carolina FC	1
E6	Loudoun United FC	0
E3	North Carolina FC	0
E7	Rhode Island FC	2
E2	Charleston Battery	0 (3)
E7	Rhode Island FC (p)	0 (5)
W1	FC Tulsa (a.e.t.)	1
W8	Colorado Springs Switchbacks FC	0
W1	FC Tulsa (a.e.t.)	1
W5	Phoenix Rising FC	0
W4	El Paso Locomotive FC	0
W5	Phoenix Rising FC	1
Western Conference
W3	New Mexico United	2
W6	San Antonio FC	0
W3	New Mexico United	2
W7	Orange County SC	1
W2	Sacramento Republic FC	0 (4)
W7	Orange County SC	0 (5)

Conference Finals; November 14–16
E4	Pittsburgh Riverhounds SC	1
E7	Rhode Island FC	0
W1	FC Tulsa	3
W3	New Mexico United	0

USL Championship Final; November 22
E4	Pittsburgh Riverhounds SC (p)	0 (5)
W1	FC Tulsa	0 (3)

== Matches ==
=== Conference Quarterfinals ===
November 1, 2025 East	Pittsburgh Riverhounds SC	0–0 (a.e.t.) (4–2 p)	Hartford Athletic	Pittsburgh, Pennsylvania
6:30 PM ET		Report		Stadium: Highmark Stadium; Attendance: 4,932; Referee: Elijio Arreguin
	Penalties
	Jacquesson (penalty scored); Mertz (penalty scored); Williams (penalty scored); Suber (penalty scored)		(penalty missed) Barry; (penalty scored) Farrell; (penalty scored) Panayotou; (penalty missed) Careaga

November 1, 2025 East	Louisville City FC	0–1	Detroit City FC	Louisville, Kentucky
7:00 PM ET		Report	Amoo-Mensah 34'	Stadium: Lynn Family Stadium; Attendance: 8,210; Referee: Greg Dopka

November 1, 2025 East	North Carolina FC	1–0	Loudoun United FC	Cary, North Carolina
7:30 PM ET	Anderson 6'	Report		Stadium: First Horizon Stadium at WakeMed Soccer Park; Attendance: 2,005; Referee: Natalie Simon

November 1, 2025 West	FC Tulsa	1–0 (a.e.t.)	Colorado Springs Switchbacks FC	Tulsa, Oklahoma
7:00 PM CT	Lukic 92'	Report		Stadium: Oneok Field; Attendance: 7,583; Referee: Ryan Carrigan

November 1, 2025 West	New Mexico United	2–0	San Antonio FC	Albuquerque, New Mexico
7:00 PM MT	Akale 20'; Noël 58'	Report		Stadium: Isotopes Park; Attendance: 8,287; Referee: Joshua Encarnación

November 1, 2025 West	El Paso Locomotive FC	0–1	Phoenix Rising FC	El Paso, Texas
7:30 PM MT		Report	Dennis 86' (pen.)	Stadium: Southwest University Park; Attendance: 3,469; Referee: Jeremy Scheer

November 2, 2025 East	Charleston Battery	0−0 (a.e.t.) (3−5 p)	Rhode Island FC	Mt. Pleasant, South Carolina
2:00 PM ET		Report		Stadium: Patriots Point Soccer Complex; Attendance: 4,532; Referee: Elton Garcia
	Penalties
	Molloy (penalty scored); Rubín (penalty scored); Rodríguez (penalty missed); Myers (penalty scored)		(penalty scored) Williams; (penalty scored) Diop; (penalty scored) Rodriguez; (penalty scored) Bacharach; (penalty scored) Mabika

November 2, 2025 West	Sacramento Republic FC	0–0 (a.e.t.) (4–5 p)	Orange County SC	Sacramento, California
6:00 PM PT		Report		Stadium: Heart Health Park; Attendance: 9,367; Referee: Nabil Bensalah
	Penalties
	Cicerone (penalty missed); Felipe (penalty missed); Ross (penalty scored); Bennett (penalty scored); Spaulding (penalty scored); Desmond (penalty scored); Gurr (penalty missed)		(penalty missed) Zubak; (penalty scored) Dunbar; (penalty scored) Pinto; (penalty missed) Latinovich; (penalty scored) Sylla; (penalty scored) Benalcazar; (penalty scored) Brewitt

=== Conference Semifinals ===
November 8, 2025 East	North Carolina FC	0–2	Rhode Island FC	Cary, North Carolina
7:00 PM ET		Report	Dikwa 81', 90+3'	Stadium: First Horizon Stadium at WakeMed Soccer Park; Attendance: 2,287; Referee: Joshua Encarnación

November 8, 2025 East	Pittsburgh Riverhounds SC	0–0 (a.e.t.) (4–3 p)	Detroit City FC	Pittsburgh, Pennsylvania
7:30 PM ET		Report		Stadium: Highmark Stadium; Attendance: 6,220; Referee: Natalie Simon
	Penalties
	Jacquesson (penalty scored); Mertz (penalty missed); Williams (penalty scored); Suber (penalty scored); Ydrach (penalty scored)		(penalty scored) Guenzatti; (penalty scored) Hernandez-Foster; (penalty missed) Amoo-Mensah; (penalty missed) Williams; (penalty scored) Bryant

November 8, 2025 West	FC Tulsa	1–0 (a.e.t.)	Phoenix Rising FC	Tulsa, Oklahoma
8:00 PM ET	Lukic 120+2'	Report		Stadium: Oneok Field; Attendance: 7,917; Referee: Brandon Stevis

November 8, 2025 West	New Mexico United	2–1	Orange County SC	Albuquerque, New Mexico
9:00 PM ET	Hurst 49'; Harris 90+4'	Report	Pinto 68'	Stadium: Isotopes Park; Attendance: 10,150; Referee: Elton García

=== Conference Finals ===
November 15 East	Pittsburgh Riverhounds SC	1–0	Rhode Island FC	Pittsburgh, Pennsylvania
6:30 PM	Mertz 55'	Report		Stadium: Highmark Stadium; Attendance: 6,745; Referee: Nabil Bensalah

November 15 West	FC Tulsa	3–0	New Mexico United	Tulsa, Oklahoma
8:30 PM	Calheira 39', 57'; Webber 76'	Report		Stadium: Oneok Field; Attendance: 9,180; Referee: Greg Dopka

=== USL Championship Final ===
November 22 Final	FC Tulsa	0–0 (a.e.t.) (3–5 p)	Pittsburgh Riverhounds SC	Tulsa, Oklahoma
12:00 PM EST		Report		Stadium: Oneok Field; Attendance: 9,507; Referee: Elijio Arreguin
	Penalties
	Calheira (penalty scored); Lukic (penalty missed); Colli (penalty scored); Batista (penalty scored)		(penalty scored) Jacquesson; (penalty scored) Mertz; (penalty scored) Boone; (penalty scored) Suber; (penalty scored) Ydrach

== Top goalscorers ==
Rank	Player	Club	Goals
1	(United States) Taylor Calheira	FC Tulsa	2
1	(Serbia) Stefan Lukic	FC Tulsa	2
1	(Cameroon) Albert Dikwa	Rhode Island FC	2
4	(United States) Devon Amoo-Mensah	Detroit City FC	1
4	(South Africa) Jamie Webber	FC Tulsa	1
4	(United States) Mukwelle Akale	New Mexico United	1
4	(Scotland) Greg Hurst	New Mexico United	1
4	(Antigua and Barbuda) Dayonn Harris	New Mexico United	1
4	(France) Valentin Noël	New Mexico United	1
4	(Saint Vincent and the Grenadines) Oalex Anderson	North Carolina FC	1
4	(United States) Malik Pinto	Orange County FC	1
4	(England) Charlie Dennis	Phoenix Rising FC	1
4	(United States) Robbie Mertz	Pittsburgh Riverhounds SC	1
