= List of FC Tulsa seasons =

FC Tulsa is an American soccer club that competes in the USL Championship, the second division of American soccer. Established in 2015 as a phoenix club of the Tulsa Roughnecks, the club began play in the third tier USL. Tulsa moved up to the second tier when USL received tier 2 sanctioning, and remained with the league when it rebranded as USL Championship. The following list covers each season of the club's existence, documenting its performance in all competitive competitions.

== Key ==
Key to competitions

- USL Championship (USLC) – The second division of soccer in the United States, established in 2010 and previously known as USL and USL Pro. The Championship was the third division of American soccer from its founding until its elevation to second division status in 2017.
- USL Cup - The interleague cup competition contested by the USL professional tiers, beginning in 2024 with USL League One only, and expanding the following year.
- U.S. Open Cup (USOC) – The premier knockout cup competition in US soccer, first contested in 1914.
- CONCACAF Champions Cup (CCC) – The premier competition in North American soccer since 1962.

Key to colors and symbols

1st or W	Winners
2nd or RU	Runners-up
Last	Wooden Spoon
♦	League Golden Boot

Key to league record

- Season = The year and article of the season
- Tier = Level on pyramid
- League = League name
- Conf/Div = Conference or division within the league
- Pld = Games played
- W = Games won
- D = Games drawn
- L = Games lost
- GF = Goals scored
- GA = Goals against
- Pts = Points
- Conf = Conference position
- Ovr = Overall league position

Key to cup record

- DNQ = Did not qualify
- NH = Competition not held or canceled
- R1 = First round
- R2 = Second round
- R3 = Third round
- Ro32 = Round of 32
- Ro16 = Round of 16
- QF = Quarterfinals
- SF = Semifinals
- RU = Runners-up
- W = Winners

== Seasons ==
As of November 23, 2025

Season	Tier	League	Conf/Div	Record									Position		Playoffs	USOC	USL Cup	Average Attendance (Note: Include statistics from league matches only.)	Top Goalscorer (Note: Includes all goals scored in league, league playoffs, league cup, U.S. Open Cup, CONCACAF Champions League, FIFA Club World Cup, and other competitive continental matches.)	
Season	Tier	League	Conf/Div	Pld	W	L	D	GF	GA	GD	Pts	PPG	Conf.	Over.	Playoffs	USOC	USL Cup	Average Attendance	Name	Goals
2015	3	USL	Western	28	11	11	6	49	46	+3	39	1.39	7th	14th	DNQ	R3	-	4,714	(Mexico) Sammy Ochoa	9
2016	3	USL	Western	30	5	21	4	25	64	−39	19	0.63	15th	29th	DNQ	R2	-	3,950	(Mexico) Sammy Ochoa	11
2017	2	USL	Western	32	14	14	4	46	49	−3	46	1.44	7th	13th	R1	R4	-	3,851	(United States) Ian Svantesson	11
2018	2	USL	Western	34	3	19	12	36	77	−41	21	0.66	17th	32nd	DNQ	R2	-	3,094	(El Salvador) Joaquin Rivas	12
2019	2	USLC	Western	34	8	16	10	45	69	−24	34	1.00	17th	31st	DNQ	R2	-	2,031	(Brazil) Rodrigo da Costa	9
2020	2	USLC	Group D	15	6	2	7	21	16	+5	25	1.67	7th	13th	R1	NH	-	2,636	(Cuba) Darío Suárez	8
2021	2	USLC	Eastern/Central	32	14	13	5	49	48	+1	47	1.47	8th	15th	R1	NH	-	3,438	(Brazil) Rodrigo da Costa	11
2022	2	USLC	Eastern	34	12	16	6	48	58	−10	42	1.24	8th	16th	DNQ	R3	-	4,044	(United States) JJ Williams (Note: Top Goalscorer by highest goal rate per 90 minutes played (JJ Williams: 0.61; Darío Suárez: 0.41; Rodrigo da Costa: 0.32))	9
2023	2	USLC	Eastern	34	10	15	9	43	55	−12	39	1.15	10th	21st	DNQ	R2	-	4,445	(United States) Phillip Goodrum	12
2024	2	USLC	Western	34	9	14	11	33	48	−15	38	1.12	10th	21st	DNQ	R16	DNP	3,714	(United States) Stefan Stojanovic	5
2025	2	USLC	Western	30	16	5	9	50	30	20	57	1.90	1st	3rd	RU	R3	GS	4,393	(United States) Taylor Calheira	21
