= 2015 Tulsa Roughnecks FC season =

Tulsa Roughnecks FC
2015 season
- Owner: Daniel & Jeff Hubbard
- Head coach: David Irving
- Stadium: ONEOK Field
- USL: 7th, Western
- U.S. Open Cup: Third Round
- Top goalscorer: Sammy Ochoa (9)
- Highest home attendance: 8,335 (3/28 vs. OKC)
- Lowest home attendance: 3,189 (7/9 vs. OC)
- Average home league attendance: 4,714
- Biggest win: TUL 4–0 VAN (7/24); TUL 5–1 SLC (8/13)
- Biggest defeat: 2-goal Loss (11 games)
Home colors	Away colors	Third colors

The 2015 Tulsa Roughnecks FC season was the club's first season of existence, and their first in the United Soccer League in the third division of American soccer. Including the previous iterations of franchises named "Tulsa Roughnecks", this was the 15th season of a soccer club named the "Roughnecks" playing in the Tulsa metropolitan area.

Outside of the USL, the Roughnecks participated in the 2015 U.S. Open Cup.

== Roster ==
No.	Name	Nationality	Position	Previous club
Goalkeepers
1	Zac Lubin	(United States)	GK	(Sweden) IFK Luleå
25	Jake Feener	(United States)	GK	(United States) Seattle Sounders U-23
Defenders
6	Ryan Price	(United States)	DF	(United States) Florida Atlantic University Owls
13	Steven Miller	(United States)	RB	(United States) Wilmington Hammerheads
17	Ben Brewster	(United States)	DF	(United States) Seacoast United Phantoms
21	Mason Grimes	(Guam)	CB	(United States) Temecula FC
-	Iarfhlaith Davoren	(Republic of Ireland)	LB	(Republic of Ireland) Sligo Rovers
-	Oscar Jiménez	(United States)	LB	(United States) Seattle Sounders U-23
-	Kyle Venter	(United States)	CB	(United States) Los Angeles Galaxy
Midfielders
2	Henri Manhebo	(United States)	DM	(United States) Clarkstown SC Eagles
4	Laurie Bell	(England)	CM	(United States) Milwaukee Panthers
14	Adam Black	(England)	MF	(United States) Austin Aztex
23	Eli Galbraith-Knapp	(United States)	MF	(United States) FC Tucson
24	Brady Ballew	(United States)	RM	(United States) Puget Sound Gunners FC
-	Julian Portugal	(Mexico)	CM	(United States) UNLV Rebels
Forwards
7	Gibson Bardsley	(United States)	FW	(Sweden) Kiruna FF
8	Chad Bond	(Wales)	CF	(Wales) Port Talbot Town
9	Sammy Ochoa	(United States)	CF	(United States) Wilmington Hammerheads
10	Lucas Cordeiro	(Brazil)	FW	(United States) Oklahoma Wesleyan Eagles
20	Cristian Mata	(United States)	FW	(United States) University of Tulsa Golden Hurricane
26	Andy Lorei	(United States)	CF	(Sweden) Bodens BK
-	Kyrian Nwabueze	(Niger)	CF	(United States) LA Laguna FC

== Competitions ==
=== USL ===
==== Standings ====
Pos	Team	Pld	W	D	L	GF	GA	GD	Pts	Qualification
5	LA Galaxy II	28	14	3	11	39	31	+8	45	First round
6	Seattle Sounders 2	28	13	3	12	45	42	+3	42	First round
7	Tulsa Roughnecks	28	11	6	11	49	46	+3	39	
8	Portland Timbers 2	28	11	2	15	38	45	−7	35	
9	Austin Aztex	28	10	3	15	32	41	−9	33	

Source: 2015 USL schedule
Rules for classification: 1) head-to-head; 2) total wins; 3) total goal differential; 4) total goals scored; 5) disciplinary points; 6) away goals scored; 7) away goal differential; 8) home goals scored; 9) home goal differential; 10) coin toss or drawing of lots

==== Results ====
March 28 1	Tulsa Roughnecks FC	1-1	OKC Energy FC	Tulsa, Oklahoma
6:00 p.m. CDT				Stadium: ONEOK Field; Attendance: 8335

April 2 2	Tulsa Roughnecks FC	0-2	St. Louis FC	Tulsa, Oklahoma
7:00 p.m. CDT				Stadium: ONEOK Field; Attendance: 3335

April 4 3	Tulsa Roughnecks FC	0-2	Austin Aztex	Tulsa, Oklahoma
7:00 p.m. CDT				Stadium: ONEOK Field; Attendance: 5067

April 16 4	Tulsa Roughnecks FC	4-3	Seattle Sounders FC 2	Tulsa, Oklahoma
7:00 p.m. CDT				Stadium: ONEOK Field; Attendance: 4025

April 25 5	Louisville City FC	2-0	Tulsa Roughnecks FC	Louisville, Kentucky
6:30 p.m. CDT				Attendance: 4877

May 8 6	Arizona United SC	1-1	Tulsa Roughnecks FC	Phoenix, Arizona
7:30 p.m. PDT				Attendance: 2858

May 13 7	LA Galaxy II	2-0	Tulsa Roughnecks FC	Carson, California
7:30 p.m. PDT				Attendance: 533

May 16 8	Orange County Blues FC	0-1	Tulsa Roughnecks FC	Orange County, California
7:00 p.m. PDT				Attendance: 958

May 22 9	Austin Aztex	0-1	Tulsa Roughnecks FC	Austin, Texas
5:00 p.m. CDT				Attendance: 2765

May 30 10	Tulsa Roughnecks FC	1-3	Portland Timbers 2	Tulsa, Oklahoma
1:30 p.m. CDT				Stadium: ONEOK Field; Attendance: 5755

June 4 11	Seattle Sounders FC 2	1-5	Tulsa Roughnecks FC	Tacoma, Washington
3:00 p.m. PDT				Attendance: 2166

June 12 12	OKC Energy FC	2-0	Tulsa Roughnecks FC	Oklahoma City, Oklahoma
7:00 p.m. CDT				Stadium: Taft Stadium; Attendance: 4777

June 19 13	Austin Aztex	1-1	Tulsa Roughnecks FC	Austin, Texas
5:00 p.m. CDT				Attendance: 2991

June 25 14	Tulsa Roughnecks FC	1-3	Sacramento Republic FC	Tulsa, Oklahoma
7:30 p.m. CDT				Stadium: ONEOK Field; Attendance: 3708

June 26 15	Tulsa Roughnecks FC	2-4	LA Galaxy II	Tulsa, Oklahoma
7:30 p.m. CDT				Stadium: ONEOK Field; Attendance: 5275

July 9 16	Tulsa Roughnecks FC	4-1	Orange County Blues FC	Tulsa, Oklahoma
1:30 p.m. CDT				Stadium: ONEOK Field; Attendance: 3189

July 11 17	Tulsa Roughnecks FC	3-1	Colorado Springs Switchbacks FC	Tulsa, Oklahoma
1:30 p.m. CDT				Stadium: ONEOK Field; Attendance: 4210

July 18 18	OKC Energy FC	1-1	Tulsa Roughnecks FC	Oklahoma City, Oklahoma
1:00 p.m. CDT				Stadium: Taft Stadium

July 24 19	Vancouver Whitecaps FC 2	0-4	Tulsa Roughnecks FC	Vancouver, British Columbia
7:05pm PDT				Attendance: 1106

July 31 20	Tulsa Roughnecks FC	1-3	Vancouver Whitecaps FC 2	Tulsa, Oklahoma
7:30 p.m. CDT				Stadium: ONEOK Field; Attendance: 5106

August 2 21	Tulsa Roughnecks FC	6-3	Arizona United SC	Tulsa, Oklahoma
7:30 p.m. CDT				Stadium: ONEOK Field; Attendance: 4023

August 5 22	Colorado Springs Switchbacks FC	0-1	Tulsa Roughnecks FC	Colorado Springs, Colorado
7:00 p.m. MDT

August 7 23	Real Monarchs SLC	1-1	Tulsa Roughnecks FC	Salt Lake City, Utah
4:00 p.m. MDT

August 13 24	Tulsa Roughnecks FC	5-1	Real Monarchs SLC	Tulsa, Oklahoma
1:30 p.m. CDT				Stadium: ONEOK Field

August 14 25	Tulsa Roughnecks FC	2-2	Louisville City FC	Tulsa, Oklahoma
5:00 p.m. CDT				Stadium: ONEOK Field

August 21 26	Portland Timbers 2	2-0	Tulsa Roughnecks FC	Portland, Oregon
3:00 p.m. PDT				Attendance: 3123

August 28 27	Sacramento Republic FC	3-1	Tulsa Roughnecks FC	Sacramento, California
3:00 p.m. PDT				Attendance: 11442

September 6 28	Tulsa Roughnecks FC	2-1	OKC Energy FC	Tulsa, Oklahoma
1:30 p.m. CDT				Stadium: ONEOK Field; Attendance: 6005

=== U.S. Open Cup ===
May 20 Second round	Tulsa Roughnecks FC	1-0	Seacoast United Phantoms	Tulsa, Oklahoma
6:00 PM CDT	Bond 8'			Stadium: Hurricane Soccer & Track Stadium

May 27 Third round	Tulsa Roughnecks FC	0-1	OKC Energy FC	Tulsa, Oklahoma
6:00 PM CDT				Stadium: ONEOK Field; Attendance: 2,584
