= Beto Ydrach =

Puerto Rican footballer (born 2001)

Personal information
- Full name: Roberto Ydrach
- Date of birth: May 17, 2001 (age 25)
- Place of birth: Orlando, Florida, U.S.
- Height: 6 ft 1 in (1.85 m)
- Positions: Defender; midfielder

Team information
- Current team: Pittsburgh Riverhounds
- Number: 16

Youth career
- Orlando City SC
- New York Red Bulls

College career
Years	Team	Apps	(Gls)
2019–2024	UCF Knights	47	(2)
2024	Akron Zips	20	(0)

Senior career*
Years	Team	Apps	(Gls)
2025–	Pittsburgh Riverhounds	39	(0)

International career^{‡}
–2020	Puerto Rico U20	3	(0)
2023–	Puerto Rico	16	(1)
- * Club domestic league appearances and goals as of October 31, 2026 ‡ National team caps and goals as of June 17, 2025

Roberto 'Beto' Ydrach (born May 21, 2001) is a professional footballer who plays as a midfielder or defender for USL Championship club Pittsburgh Riverhounds. Born in the United States, he plays for the Puerto Rico national team.

== Youth and college career ==
Ydrach played in the Orlando City SC academy, primarily at U-14 level, and the New York Red Bulls Academy prior to college.

In the 2020–21 season with the UCF Knights at collegiate level, Ydrach played 13 games and registered two assists, both of those coming in a match against SMU Mustangs. In the 2021 season, Ydrach played 14 games, starting eight of them. He also scored his first goal at college goal, heading home a corner from Nick Taylor against the Memphis Tigers. In the 2023 season, Ydrach scored in a 2–2 draw against the FIU Panthers from a free-kick.

Ydrach joined the Akron Zips in 2024, playing all 20 games of the season, with 19 of those being starts. Ydrach was also awarded the BIG EAST Men's Soccer Defensive Player of the Year honor.

== Club career ==
=== Pittsburgh Riverhounds ===
On February 24, 2025, Ydrach signed with USL Championship club Pittsburgh Riverhounds on a 1-year deal with a club option for the 2026 season. Ydrach made his Riverhounds debut in a 1–1 draw with North Carolina FC, playing 69 minutes before being replaced by Illal Osumanu. In the U.S. Open Cup, Ydrach headed home a 94th-minute winner against Major League Soccer side New York City FC from Robbie Mertz's corner. On November 11, Ydrach scored converted his penalty against FC Tulsa in a penalty shoot-out to secure Pittsburgh Riverhounds' first USL Championship title.

== International career ==
=== Puerto Rico ===
Ydrach played three games for the Puerto Rico U-20 national team in 2020 CONCACAF U-20 Championship qualifying.

Ydrach made his Puerto Rico national team debut in a 3–0 victory over the Cayman Islands in the CONCACAF Nations League. He scored his first goal for his country in a 8–0 win over Anguilla on June 11, 2024.

== Honors ==
Individual

- BIG EAST Men's Soccer Defensive Player of the Year: 2024

Pittsburgh Riverhounds

- USL Championship playoffs: 2025
