= Marcos Serrato =

Brazilian footballer (born 1994)

Personal information
- Full name: Marcos Vinicius Serrato
- Date of birth: 8 February 1994 (age 32)
- Place of birth: Curitiba, Brazil
- Height: 1.73 m (5 ft 8 in)
- Position: Midfielder

Team information
- Current team: FC Tulsa
- Number: 5

Youth career
- 2011–2013: Paraná

Senior career*
Years	Team	Apps	(Gls)
2013–2015	Paraná	29	(2)
2015–2017	Ponte Preta	4	(0)
2016	→ Tupi (loan)	35	(6)
2017	→ Vila Nova (loan)	14	(0)
2018–2020	Ituano	69	(5)
2018	→ Maringá (loan)	7	(0)
2019	→ CRB (loan)	1	(0)
2020–2021	Sport	5	(0)
2021–2022	Avaí	37	(3)
2022	Criciúma EC	26	(0)
2023	Daegu FC	11	(0)
2023	Atlético Goianiense	6	(0)
2024–2025	Brusque	59	(1)
2025–	FC Tulsa	20	(2)
- * Club domestic league appearances and goals as of 16:55, 11 November 2026 (UTC)

Marcos Vinicius Serrato (born 8 February 1994) is a Brazilian footballer who plays for USL Championship side FC Tulsa a midfielder.

== Career statistics ==
As of 16 February 2018

Appearances and goals by club, season and competition
Club	Season	League			State league		National cup		Continental		Other		Total	
Club	Season	Division	Apps	Goals	Apps	Goals	Apps	Goals	Apps	Goals	Apps	Goals	Apps	Goals
Paraná	2014	Série B	21	2	—		1	0	—		—		22	2
Paraná	2015	Série B	—		7	0	1	0	—		—		8	0
Paraná	Total		21	2	7	0	2	0	—		—		30	2
Ponte Preta	2015	Série A	1	0	—		—		2 (Note: Appearance(s) in Copa Sudamericana)	0	—		3	0
Ponte Preta	2016	Série A	—		1	0	—		—		—		1	0
Ponte Preta	Total		1	0	1	0	—		2	0	—		4	0
Tupi	2016	Série B	35	6	—		—		—		—		35	6
Vila Nova	2017	Série B	—		12	0	2	0	—		—		14	0
Ituano	2018	Paulista	—		3	0	1	0	—		—		4	0
Career total			57	8	23	0	5	0	2	0	0	0	87	8
