= Michelle Benítez =

Mexican footballer (born 1996)

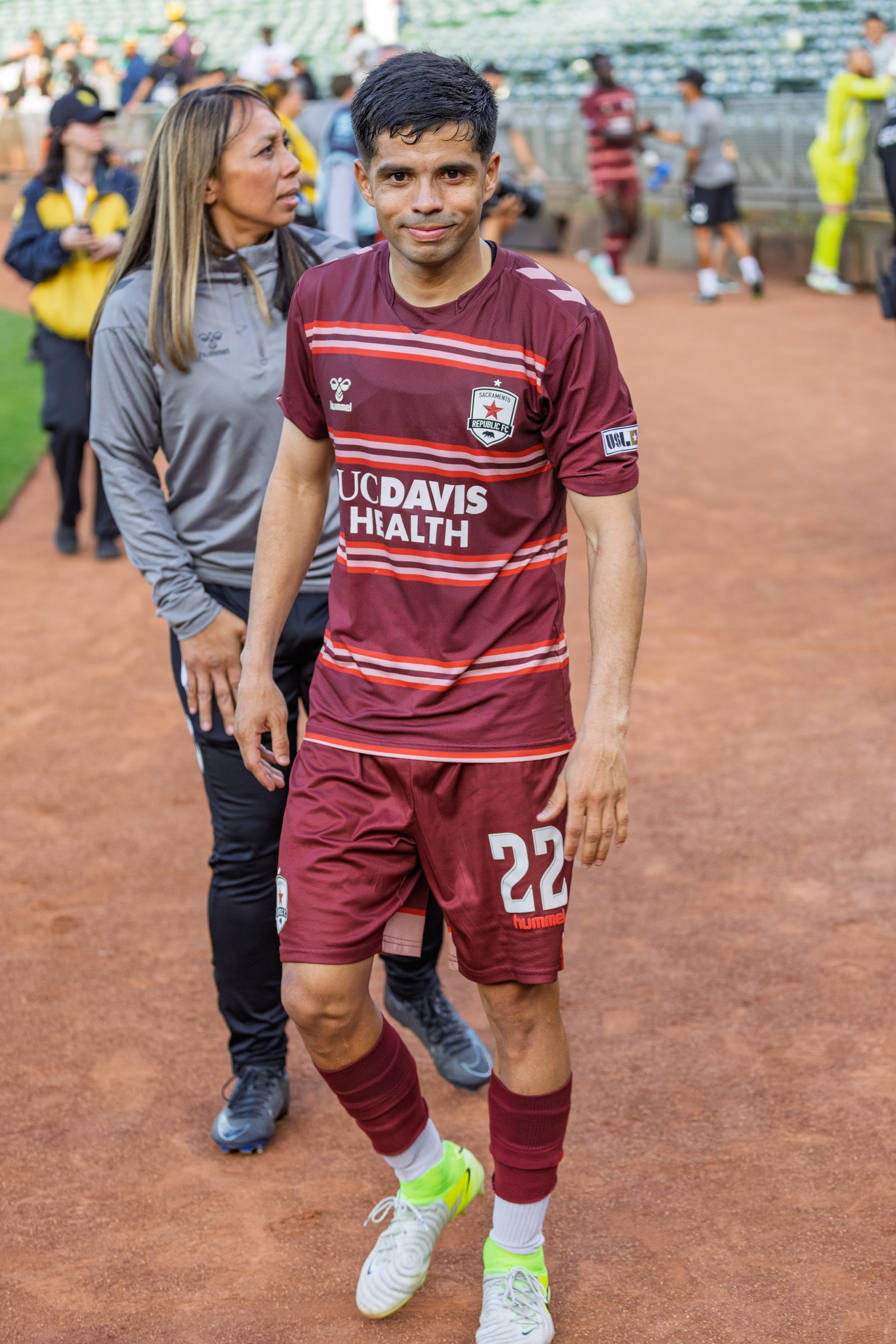
- Benítez with the Sacramento Republic in 2026

Personal information
- Full name: Michelle Jonathan Benítez Valenzuela
- Date of birth: 12 February 1996 (age 30)
- Place of birth: Culiacán, Sinaloa, Mexico
- Height: 1.68 m (5 ft 6 in)
- Position: Winger

Team information
- Current team: Sacramento Republic
- Number: 22

Youth career
- 2011–2013: Aguilas de UAS
- 2013–2016: Guadalajara

Senior career*
Years	Team	Apps	(Gls)
2017–2022	Guadalajara	13	(1)
2018	→ Zacatepec (loan)	6	(0)
2019–2020	→ Celaya (loan)	29	(4)
2020–2022	→ Tapatío (loan)	44	(4)
2023–2024	Atlético La Paz	65	(13)
2025–	Sacramento Republic	47	(4)
- * Club domestic league appearances and goals as of 11:56, 11 November 2026 (UTC)

Michelle Jonathan Benítez Valenzuela (Note: In this Spanish name, the first or paternal surname is Benítez and the second or maternal family name is Valenzuela.) (born 12 February 1996) is a Mexican professional footballer who plays as a winger for Sacramento Republic in the USL Championship.

== Career ==
=== Youth ===
Benítez started his career with small club in his hometown of Sinaloa. From 2011 to 2013 he played for Águilas de la UAS. He then joined Guadalajara's youth academy in 2013. He arrived to Chivas Youth Academy going through U-17 and U-20. Until finally reaching the first team, Matías Almeyda being the coach promoting Benítez to first team.

=== Guadalajara ===
Michelle Benítez made his official debut under Argentine coach Matias Almeyda in the Liga MX which was on March 4, 2017. He was subbed in at 46 minute against Toluca which ended in a 0–0 draw.

=== Sacramento Republic FC ===
On December 20, 2024, USL Championship side Sacramento Republic FC announced they had signed Benítez to a contract for the 2025 season. He signed a multi-year extension with the club on June 11, 2026.

== Honours ==
Guadalajara

- Liga MX: Clausura 2017
- Copa MX: Clausura 2017
- CONCACAF Champions League: 2018
