= FC Tulsa =

American professional soccer club based in Tulsa

- Nickname: Scissortails
- Founded: December 18, 2013; 12 years ago (as Tulsa Roughnecks FC)
- Stadium: ONEOK Field; Tulsa, Oklahoma
- Capacity: 9,180
- Owners: Ryan, J.W. and Kyle Craft
- Head Coach: Luke Spencer
- League: USL Championship
- 2025: 1st, Western Conference; Playoffs: Western Conference Champions
- Website: fctulsa.com
Home colors	Away colors

FC Tulsa is an American professional soccer team based in Tulsa, Oklahoma which competes in the USL Championship, the second tier of the American soccer pyramid.

== History ==
The club was founded as Tulsa Roughnecks FC by Jeff and Dale Hubbard, brothers and co-owners of the Tulsa Drillers minor league baseball franchise. The Hubbards were announced as co-owners and co-chairs on December 18, 2013. Prodigal, LLC., owner of Oklahoma City Energy FC, another USL club, served as a minority owner.

On February 26, 2014, it was announced that the team would be known as Tulsa Roughnecks FC, paying homage to the original Roughnecks which played in the original North American Soccer League from 1978 until the league folded in 1984 (and were best known for winning Soccer Bowl '83). The name received nearly 50% of the votes in a "name the team" contest held in February 2014.

The team logo, colors and uniforms were introduced on September 2, 2014. The oil derrick in the original logo, as well as the name of the team, was a reference to Tulsa's "Oil Capitol" heritage; the dictionary definition of a "roughneck" is a worker in an oil-well drilling crew. The team colors are Orange and Navy Blue with all kits supplied by Adidas.

On August 20, 2019, it was announced that the Craft family, composed of Tulsa natives and brothers JW, Ryan, and Kyle Craft, had acquired the club from the Drillers and Prodigal Soccer.

On December 4, 2019, the club announced that it would be renamed as FC Tulsa beginning with the 2020 season. The team's new logo was designed by Matthew Wolff.

On November 15, 2025, FC Tulsa won the USL Championship 2025 Western Conference Championship title after a 3–0 win over New Mexico United.

== Stadium ==
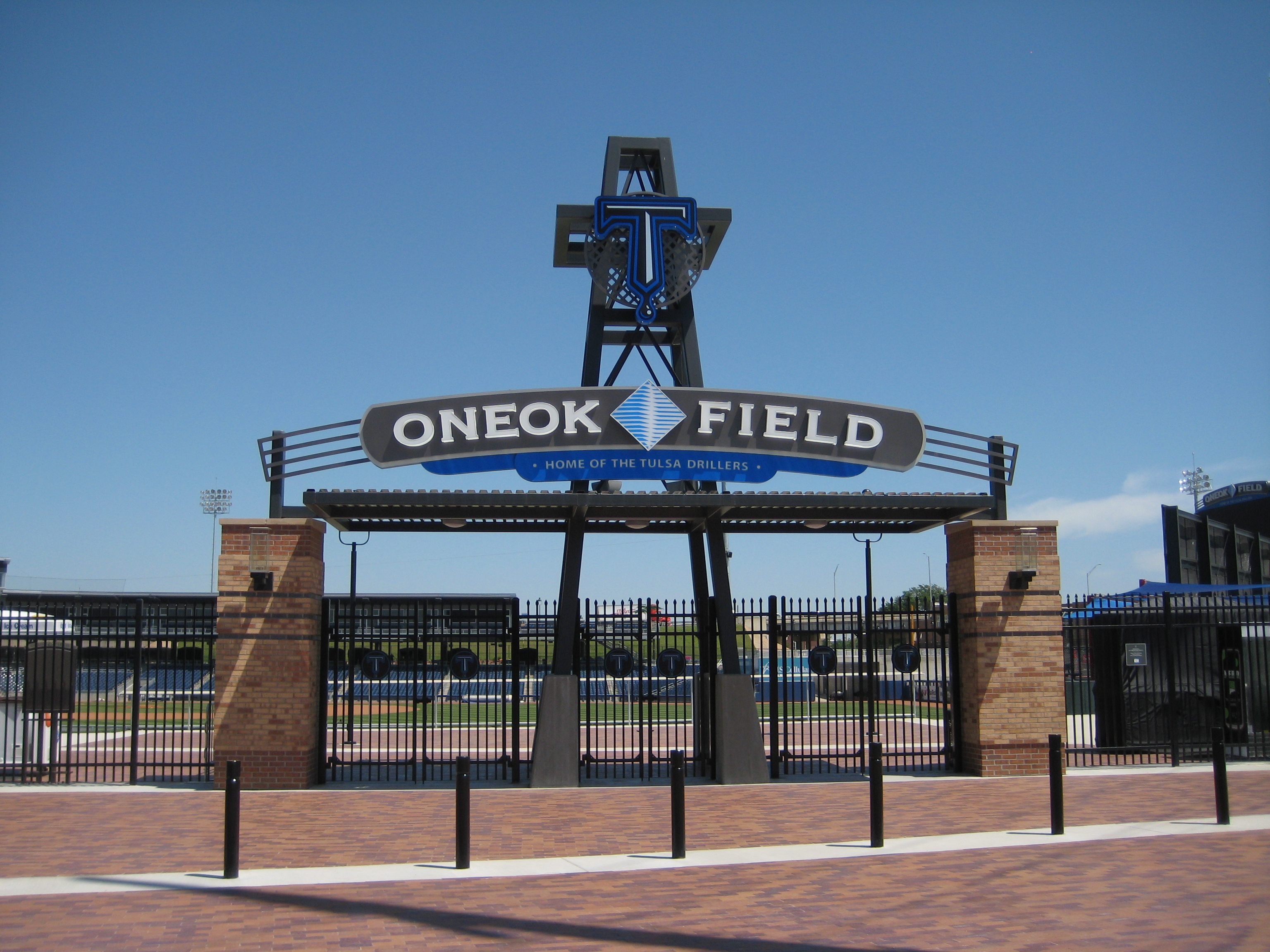
Entrance to ONEOK Field, home to FC Tulsa

The team plays at ONEOK Field, a 7,833-seat stadium in the Greenwood District of Downtown Tulsa. The field opened in 2010 and was made the FC Tulsa's home in 2015.

In order to transform the field from a baseball field to a soccer pitch, real sod is laid down atop the entire infield and the pitch stretches the length of the stadium, with one goal on the North side of the pitch and the other on the South side.

On November 22, 2025, the team set the stadium attendance record 9,507, for the nationally-televised USL Championship Final between FC Tulsa and Pittsburgh Riverhounds SC.)

== Club culture ==
FC Tulsa's main rivals are Oklahoma City Energy FC in the Black Gold Derby, with both teams being located in Oklahoma. The supporters group of both teams established a trophy, a four-foot wrench painted with the colors of each team on either side, which is awarded to the regular season winner of the derby.

83UNITED are the only supporters group recognized by the club. There are two unofficial supporters groups: Tulsa Lunatics and 918 Brigade.

FC Tulsa also shares a local derby with Tulsa Athletic, with both teams playing in Tulsa. While the teams have played in preseason, they can only meet in official competition during the Lamar Hunt U.S. Open Cup, which has now happened three times:

=== Derby results ===
FC Tulsa win Draw Tulsa Athletic win

5 Apr 2022 USOC	FC Tulsa	2–1	Tulsa Athletic	Tulsa, OK
7:30pm CDT	Brown 5'; Rodríguez 28'	Report	Nzojyibwami 77'	Stadium: ONEOK Field; Attendance: 2,338
Note: Inaugural Tulsa Derby

5 Apr 2023 USOC	Tulsa Athletic	1–0	FC Tulsa	Tulsa, OK
7:00pm CDT	Harris 58'	Report		Stadium: Athletic Community Field at Hicks Park; Attendance: 1,025; Referee: Brandon Gardner

19 Mar 2025 USOC	Tulsa Athletic	0–1	FC Tulsa	Tulsa, OK
7:00pm CDT		Report	Calheira 84' (pen.)	Stadium: Athletic Community Field at Hicks Park; Referee: Rodrigo Albuquerque

== Sponsorship ==
Period	Kit manufacturer	Shirt sponsor
2015–2016	(England) Admiral	Oculto
2017–2018	(United States) New Balance	Osage Casino
2019	(Germany) Adidas	Osage Casino
2020–2021	(Germany) Adidas	Williams
2022–2024	(Germany) Puma	Williams
2025–present	(Denmark) Hummel	Williams

== Players and staff ==
=== Current roster ===
As of August 5, 2026

Note: Flags indicate national team as defined under FIFA eligibility rules; some limited exceptions apply. Players may hold more than one non-FIFA nationality.

No.	Pos.	Nation	Player
1	GK	GRE	Alexandros Tabakis
2	DF	USA	Owen Damm
4	DF	HAI	Delentz Pierre
5	MF	BRA	Marcos Serrato
6	MF	USA	Boubacar Diallo
7	FW	FRA	Rémi Cabral
8	MF	RSA	Jamie Webber
9	MF	GUA	Arquímides Ordóñez
10	FW	USA	Kalil ElMedkhar
11	FW	USA	Dylan Borczak (on loan from Union Omaha)
12	DF	USA	Lucas Stauffer
13	MF	USA	Jeorgio Kocevski
14	FW	USA	Logan Dorsey (on loan from Minnesota United 2)
15	DF	USA	Lamar Batista

No.	Pos.	Nation	Player
17	MF	USA	Bailey Sparks
20	MF	AUS	Giordano Colli
22	MF	SRB	Stefan Lukic
23	DF	USA	Wilson Eisner (on loan from San Diego FC)
25	DF	USA	Alonzo Clarke
27	MF	USA	Zion Siranga
28	GK	USA	Dane Jacomen
31	DF	USA	Grant Robinson
44	DF	USA	Joel Sangwa
47	DF	SCO	Harvey St Clair
66	DF	KEN	Will Wilson
91	DF	FRA	Abdoulaye Cissoko
98	DF	BRA	Ian
99	GK	USA	Noah Adams

=== Staff ===
As of January 9, 2025

- (United States) Caleb Patterson-Sewell – sporting director / general manager
- (United States) Mario Sanchez – technical director
- (United States) Luke Spencer – head coach
- (Brazil) Gabriel Zapponi - assistant coach
- (England) Alexis Vizarelis - goalkeeping coach
- (Brazil) Leandro Spinola – sports science director
- (United States) Destiny Lalaguna – head athletic trainer

=== Head coaches ===
As of November 23, 2025

Coach	Nationality	Start	End	Games	Win	Draw	Loss	Win %
David Irving	England	November 18, 2014	December 6, 2016	61	17	10	34	27.87
David Vaudreuil	United States	December 6, 2016	June 25, 2018	52	15	12	25	28.85
Michael Nsien	Nigeria	June 25, 2018	June 17, 2022	114	36	28	50	31.58
Donovan Ricketts (interim)	Jamaica	June 17, 2022	December 31, 2022	11	6	1	4	54.55
Blair Gavin	United States	January 1, 2023	January 8, 2024	35	10	9	16	28.57
Mario Sanchez	United States	January 16, 2024	November 13, 2024	37	11	11	15	29.73
Luke Spencer	United States	November 13, 2024	present	42	22	13	7	52.38
Total				352	117	84	151	33.24

- Includes USL regular season, USL playoffs, USL Cup, and U.S. Open Cup

== Year-by-year ==
This is a partial list of the last five seasons completed by FC Tulsa. For the full season-by-season history, see List of FC Tulsa seasons.

As of November 23, 2025

Season	Tier	League	Conf/Div	Record									Position		Playoffs	USOC	USL Cup	Average Attendance (Note: Include statistics from league matches only.)	Top Goalscorer (Note: Includes all goals scored in league, league playoffs, league cup, U.S. Open Cup, CONCACAF Champions League, FIFA Club World Cup, and other competitive continental matches.)	
Season	Tier	League	Conf/Div	Pld	W	L	D	GF	GA	GD	Pts	PPG	Conf.	Over.	Playoffs	USOC	USL Cup	Average Attendance	Name	Goals
2021	2	USLC	Eastern/Central	32	14	13	5	49	48	+1	47	1.47	8th	15th	R1	NH	-	3,438	(Brazil) Rodrigo da Costa	11
2022	2	USLC	Eastern	34	12	16	6	48	58	−10	42	1.24	8th	16th	DNQ	R3	-	4,044	(United States) JJ Williams (Note: Top Goalscorer by highest goal rate per 90 minutes played (JJ Williams: 0.61; Darío Suárez: 0.41; Rodrigo da Costa: 0.32))	9
2023	2	USLC	Eastern	34	10	15	9	43	55	−12	39	1.15	10th	21st	DNQ	R2	-	4,445	(United States) Phillip Goodrum	12
2024	2	USLC	Western	34	9	14	11	33	48	−15	38	1.12	10th	21st	DNQ	R16	DNP	3,714	(United States) Stefan Stojanovic	5
2025	2	USLC	Western	30	16	5	9	50	30	20	57	1.90	1st	3rd	RU	R3	GS	4,393	(United States) Taylor Calheira	21

== Honors ==
=== League ===
USL Championship

- Runners-up (Playoffs): 2025
- Western Conference
  - Champions (Regular Season): 2025
  - Champions (Playoffs): 2025

== Player career records ==
As of October 15, 2025

=== Appearances ===
#	Name	Career	Total
1	(United States) Bradley Bourgeois	2017, 2020–24	150
2	(Brazil) Rodrigo da Costa	2020–23	128
3	(United States) Eric Bird	2020–23	101
4	(El Salvador) Joaquín Rivas	2017–18, 2021–22	100
5	(Cuba) Darío Suárez	2020–23	91

=== Goals ===
#	Name	Career	Total
1	(Brazil) Rodrigo da Costa	2020–23	36
2	(Cuba) Darío Suárez	2020–23	29
3	(El Salvador) Joaquín Rivas	2017–18, 2021–22	27
4	(United States) Taylor Calheira	2025–	21
5	(Mexico) Sammy Ochoa	2015-16	20

=== Assists ===
#	Name	Career	Total
1	(Brazil) Rodrigo da Costa	2020–23	25
2	(Honduras) Christian Altamirano	2019-20	11
3	(Cuba) Darío Suárez	2020–23	10
4	(United States) Eric Bird	2020–23	9
5	(El Salvador) Joaquín Rivas	2017–18, 2021–22	9

== Affiliations ==
During the 2017 and 2018 seasons, Tulsa Roughnecks had an MLS affiliation with the Chicago Fire FC. The Roughnecks' head coach at the time, David Vaudreuil, had made 26 appearances for Chicago during the 2001–2002 MLS season. The Roughnecks' affiliation with the Chicago Fire was dissolved as of January 2019.

On February 11, 2020, Tulsa formed a partnership with EFL Championship side Wigan Athletic after tweeting about a possible friendship with a Championship side, to which Wigan responded.

On January 18, 2024, FC Tulsa announced a strategic partnership with Serie C team US Triestina Calcio 1918 covering all areas of technical squad management including scouting, data analysis, player development and operational best practices.
