= Kalil ElMedkhar =

American soccer player (born 1999)

Personal information
- Full name: Kalil ElMedkhar
- Date of birth: August 18, 1999 (age 27)
- Place of birth: Middletown, Delaware, United States
- Height: 6 ft 0 in (1.83 m)
- Position: Winger

Team information
- Current team: FC Tulsa
- Number: 10

Youth career
- 2013–2017: Philadelphia Union

College career
Years	Team	Apps	(Gls)
2017–2019	Kentucky Wildcats	66	(20)

Senior career*
Years	Team	Apps	(Gls)
2018–2019	Reading United	17	(4)
2021–2022	FC Dallas	11	(0)
2021–2022	→ North Texas SC (loan)	13	(4)
2023–2024	Loudoun United	50	(14)
2025–	FC Tulsa	47	(8)
- * Club domestic league appearances and goals as of November 10, 2026

Kalil ElMedkhar (born August 18, 1999) is an American professional soccer player who plays for FC Tulsa in the USL Championship.

== Playing career ==
=== Youth ===
ElMedkhar joined the Philadelphia Union YSC Academy in 2013, where he played for five years.

=== College and amateur ===
ElMedkhar attended the University of Kentucky to play college soccer. In four seasons with the Wildcats, ElMedkhar made 66 appearances, scoring 20 goals and tallying 21 assists. Accolades earned during his time in college saw ElMedkhar named to United Soccer Coaches All-Southeast Region First Team and All-Conference USA First Team in 2018 and 2019, as well as to the C-USA Commissioner's Honor Roll and Fall SEC Academic Honor Roll in 2019. Prior to the start of his junior year season, ElMedkhar was also named C-USA Preseason Co-Offensive Player of the Year, to the MAC Hermann Trophy Watch List and the C-USA Preseason Team.

ElMedkhar also appeared for USL League Two side Reading United AC in both 2018 and 2019, making 22 appearances and scoring 5 goals across the regular season and playoffs.

=== Professional ===
On January 14, 2021, ElMedkhar signed a two-year deal with MLS side FC Dallas after Dallas acquired his homegrown player rights from Philadelphia Union in exchange for $50,000 of General Allocation Money, with further Allocation Money dependence on ElMedkhar meeting certain performance metrics.

He made his professional debut on May 8, 2021, starting for Dallas's USL League One affiliate side North Texas SC against Chattanooga Red Wolves in a 1–0 loss.

Following the 2022 season, ElMedkhar's contract option was declined by Dallas.

On January 12, 2023, ElMedkhar signed with D.C. United affiliate club Loudoun United.

ElMedkhar joined FC Tulsa on November 18, 2024, as their first acquisition of the offseason.

== Personal ==
ElMedkhar was born in Delaware in the United States, but also holds Syrian citizenship as his father emigrated from Syria to study medicine at the University of Delaware. His mother died due to cancer in June 2023.
