= Boubacar Diallo (soccer, born 2002) =

American soccer player (born 2002)

Personal information
- Date of birth: December 9, 2002 (age 23)
- Place of birth: Livingston, New Jersey, U.S.
- Height: 5 ft 11 in (1.80 m)
- Position: Midfielder

Team information
- Current team: FC Tulsa
- Number: 6

Youth career
- –2022: Diambars
- 2022: Philadelphia Union

Senior career*
Years	Team	Apps	(Gls)
2022–2023	Philadelphia Union II	48	(3)
2024–	FC Tulsa	64	(4)
- * Club domestic league appearances and goals as of November 10, 2026

Boubacar Diallo (born December 9, 2002) is an American professional soccer player who plays as a midfielder for FC Tulsa in the USL Championship.

== Early life ==
Diallo was born in Livingston, New Jersey, in the United States whilst his father, the Senegalese footballer Mamadou Diallo, was playing for Major League Soccer side MetroStars in 2002. Diallo was part of the Diambars FC academy before moving back to the United States to join the Philadelphia Union academy in 2022.

== Career ==
=== Philadelphia Union II ===
After appearing for MLS Next Pro side Philadelphia Union II early on in the season, Diallo signed a professional deal with the club on August 24, 2022. He went on to make 48 regular season appearances for the Union reserve team, scoring three goals and tallying two assists.

=== FC Tulsa ===
On March 13, 2024, Diallo signed a one-year deal with USL Championship side FC Tulsa.
