= Owen Damm =

American soccer player (born 2003)

Personal information
- Date of birth: August 22, 2003 (age 23)
- Place of birth: Versailles, Kentucky, United States
- Height: 6 ft 0 in (1.83 m)
- Positions: Defender; midfielder

Team information
- Current team: FC Tulsa
- Number: 2

Youth career
- –2021: Louisville City

Senior career*
Years	Team	Apps	(Gls)
2021–2024	Louisville City	5	(0)
2022	→ Northern Colorado Hailstorm (loan)	14	(0)
2024	→ FC Tulsa (loan)	25	(0)
2025–	FC Tulsa	44	(2)
- * Club domestic league appearances and goals as of November 10, 2026

Owen Damm (born August 22, 2003) is an American professional soccer player who plays as a defender for FC Tulsa in the USL Championship.

== Club career ==
=== Youth ===
Damm attended Woodford County High School. His contributions to his School helped them to a trio of district titles from 2019 to 2021. Within this time frame, he would make the all-state lists three times, including a first team spot in 2020.

In February 2021, Damm signed a USL academy contract with USL Championship side Louisville City, which allowed him to retain his NCAA eligibility.

=== Professional ===
On December 21, 2021, it was announced that Damm had signed a professional deal with Louisville City, which included a scholarship at Bellevue University.

On April 6, 2022, Damm was loaned to USL League One's ahead of their inaugural season. He made his professional debut the same day, appearing as a half-time substitute in a Lamar Hunt U.S. Open Cup game against the Colorado Springs Switchbacks.

On May 17, 2024, Damm was loaned to USL Championship side FC Tulsa for the remainder of the 2024 season. On December 6, 2024, it was announced that Damm would make the move to Tulsa permanent ahead of their 2025 season off of a free transfer.
