= Jamie Webber =

South African soccer player (born 1998)

Personal information
- Full name: Jamie Craig Webber
- Date of birth: 21 January 1998 (age 28)
- Place of birth: Portland, Cape Town, South Africa
- Height: 5 ft 11 in (1.80 m)
- Position: Midfielder

Team information
- Current team: FC Tulsa
- Number: 8

Senior career*
| Years | Team | Apps | (Gls) |
| 2016 | Vasco da Gama | 6 | (0) |
| 2016–2018 | Stellenbosch | 19 | (1) |
| 2018–2023 | SuperSport United | 104 | (5) |
| 2023–2025 | Sekhukhune United | 25 | (4) |
| 2025– | FC Tulsa | 61 | (6) |

International career^{‡}
- South Africa U23
| 2017–2019 | South Africa | 10 | (0) |
- * Club domestic league appearances and goals as of 31 October 2026 ‡ National team caps and goals as of 9 July 2023

Jamie Craig Webber (born 21 January 1998) is a South African professional soccer player who plays as a midfielder for USL Championship side FC Tulsa.

== Club career ==
After playing for Vasco da Gama and Stellenbosch in the National First Division, he joined SuperSport United in January 2018. He moved on to Sekhukhune United in the summer of 2023.

On 17 April 2025, Webber joined second-tier US side FC Tulsa for an undisclosed transfer fee.

== International career ==
He was called up to the South Africa squad in June 2017 for the COSAFA Cup, and made his debut for South Africa in the competition.

He has also represented South Africa at under-23 level.
