= Stefan Lukic (footballer) =

Serbian footballer (born 1996)

Personal information
- Date of birth: 1 June 1996 (age 30)
- Place of birth: Sremska Mitrovica, FR Yugoslavia
- Height: 1.83 m (6 ft 0 in)
- Positions: Midfielder; forward

Team information
- Current team: FC Tulsa
- Number: 22

Youth career
- 2007–2017: Partizan

College career
Years	Team	Apps	(Gls)
2017–2021	OKWU Eagles	112	(62)

Senior career*
Years	Team	Apps	(Gls)
2018–2019	Corpus Christi FC	21	(9)
2022–2023	Northern Colorado Hailstorm	52	(2)
2024–2025	Chattanooga Red Wolves	21	(1)
2025–	FC Tulsa	44	(5)
- * Club domestic league appearances and goals as of November 10, 2026

Stefan Lukic (born 1 June 1996) is a Serbian footballer who plays as a midfielder for FC Tulsa in USL Championship.

== Career ==
=== Youth ===
Lukic was recruited to play with Partizan when he was just 11-year's old. Lukic spent nine of his eleven years at Partizan as captain of the club's various age-group sides. As a youth player, Lukic was linked to top European teams and was close to joining Everton, but the deal collapsed.

=== College and amateur ===
In 2017, Lukic moved to the United States to play college soccer at Oklahoma Wesleyan University. During his five seasons with the Eagles, including a truncated 2020 season due to the COVID-19 pandemic, Lukic went on appear in 112 matches, scoring 62 goals and tallying 93 assists as one of the Eagles' best all-time scorers. Lukic helped the Eagles reach the NAIA national tournament Final Four in multiple years, earned NAIA First-Team All-America honors every year between 2018 and 2021, the Kansas Collegiate Athletic Conference MVP four times, and was the 2019 NAIA Men's Soccer National Player of the Year.

In both 2018 and 2019, Lukic played in the USL League Two with Corpus Christi FC, scoring nine goals in 21 regular season appearances over two seasons.

=== Professional ===
On 1 February 2022, Lukic signed his first professional contract, joining USL League One club Northern Colorado Hailstorm ahead of their inaugural season. He debuted for the club on 6 April 2022, starting in a Lamar Hunt U.S. Open Cup game against Colorado Springs Switchbacks.

On 22 December 2023, it was announced that Lukic would join Chattanooga Red Wolves SC ahead of their 2024 season.
