= Bertin Jacquesson =

French football player (born 2001)

Personal information
- Full name: Bertin Jacquesson
- Date of birth: 20 January 2001 (age 25)
- Place of birth: Lorrez-le-Bocage, France
- Height: 1.83 m (6 ft 0 in)
- Position: Forward

Team information
- Current team: Oakland Roots
- Number: 27

Youth career
- RCP Fontainebleau
- –2018: Brétigny Foot CS
- 2018–2019: RC Strasbourg

College career
Years	Team	Apps	(Gls)
2020–2022	Pittsburgh Panthers	61	(19)

Senior career*
Years	Team	Apps	(Gls)
2019–2020	SO Châtellerault	16	(1)
2023–2024	Real Salt Lake	10	(0)
2023–2024	Real Monarchs	18	(2)
2024	→ Pittsburgh Riverhounds (loan)	7	(5)
2025	Pittsburgh Riverhounds	22	(1)
2026–	Oakland Roots	25	(4)
- * Club domestic league appearances and goals as of 10:59, 10 November 2026 (UTC)

Bertin Jacquesson (born 20 January 2001) is a French professional footballer who currently plays for Oakland Roots SC in the USL Championship.

== Early life ==
Jacquesson played as a youth player for RCP Fontainebleau before playing in Brétigny-sur-Orge for SC Brétigny. He was prolific in the national U17 level championships for Brétigny, scoring eighteen goals in twenty-three games. In December 2018 he was signed up by RC Strasbourg, where spent a year, before moving to SO Châtellerault.

== Career ==
=== Pittsburgh Panthers ===
Playing in the US college system for the University of Pittsburgh soccer team the Pittsburgh Panthers, Jacquesson made an immediate impact in the autumn of 2020, starting matches as a freshman. He was named Atlantic Coast Conference Men's Soccer Freshman of the Year for the 2020–21 season.

Overall he scored 19 goals, and provided 23 assists, in 61 appearances as Pitt made three consecutive Elite Eight appearances and two College Cups between 2020 and 2022. Ahead of the MLS SuperDraft in December 2022 Jacquesson signed a Generation Adidas contract with the league.

=== Real Salt Lake ===
Jacquesson was drafted in the first round of the SuperDraft at number sixteen by Real Salt Lake. Jacquesson made his debut against Las Vegas Lights FC in the U.S. Open Cup on April 26, 2023, and made his MLS debut four days later on April 30, 2023, against Seattle Sounders FC. Jacquesson's contract option was declined by Salt Lake following their 2024 season.

=== Pittsburgh Riverhounds ===
On 10 January 2025, Jacquesson signed a one-year deal with USL Championship side Pittsburgh Riverhounds who he'd spent time on loan with in the previous season.

=== Oakland Roots ===
On 3 March 2026, Oakland Roots of the USL Championship announced they had signed Jacquesson for the 2026 season.

== Personal life ==
Born in France, Jacquesson is of Guinean descent. As a Muslim, he has at times had to balance his soccer career with observing Ramadan.
