= Robbie Mertz =

American soccer player (born 1996)

Personal information
- Full name: Charles Robbins Mertz Jr.
- Date of birth: December 4, 1996 (age 29)
- Place of birth: Pittsburgh, Pennsylvania, United States
- Height: 5 ft 7 in (1.70 m)
- Position: Midfielder

Team information
- Current team: Pittsburgh Riverhounds
- Number: 14

Youth career
- 2005–2015: Century United

College career
Years	Team	Apps	(Gls)
2015–2018	Michigan Wolverines	76	(9)

Senior career*
Years	Team	Apps	(Gls)
2016	Chicago FC United	9	(2)
2017	Burlingame Dragons	3	(0)
2019–2020	Pittsburgh Riverhounds	40	(11)
2021–2022	Atlanta United 2	48	(4)
2022–	Pittsburgh Riverhounds	128	(12)
- * Club domestic league appearances and goals as of November 7, 2026

Charles Robbins Mertz Jr. (born December 4, 1996) is an American professional soccer player who plays as a midfielder for USL Championship club Pittsburgh Riverhounds SC. He played college soccer for the Michigan Wolverines.

== Career ==
=== College and amateur ===
Mertz played four years of college soccer at the University of Michigan between 2015 and 2018.

Mertz also played with Premier Development League sides Chicago FC United and Burlingame Dragons.

=== Professional ===
On January 14, 2019, Mertz was selected 76th overall in the 2019 MLS SuperDraft by Colorado Rapids. However, he was released by the club during their pre-season.

Mertz signed his first professional deal with USL Championship club Pittsburgh Riverhounds on March 29, 2019.

On January 12, 2021, Mertz moved to USL Championship side Atlanta United 2. Mertz quickly became a fixture for Atlanta 2, wearing the captain's armband often in 2021 and in every match he played in 2022.

On July 20, 2022, Mertz returned to Pittsburgh Riverhounds SC in exchange for conditional compensation.

== Personal life ==
Mertz is married to University of North Carolina women’s soccer player Kate Morris. The couple welcomed their first son on June 5, 2025.

Mertz has three siblings; his younger sister Landy played college soccer at Pittsburgh.
