= Lamar Batista =

American soccer player (born 1998)

Personal information
- Full name: Lamar DeShawn Batista
- Date of birth: March 7, 1998 (age 28)
- Place of birth: Waco, Texas, US
- Height: 1.96 m (6 ft 5 in)
- Position: Defender

Team information
- Current team: FC Tulsa
- Number: 15

College career
Years	Team	Apps	(Gls)
2016	UC Santa Barbara Gauchos	18	(0)

Senior career*
Years	Team	Apps	(Gls)
2017–2018	Portland Timbers 2	43	(1)
2017–2018	Portland Timbers	0	(0)
2019	Los Angeles FC	0	(0)
2019	→ Phoenix Rising (loan)	2	(0)
2019	→ FC Tucson (loan)	18	(0)
2020	North Texas SC	5	(0)
2021	Colorado Springs Switchbacks	3	(0)
2021	→ OKC Energy (loan)	15	(1)
2022	Rochester New York	22	(1)
2023	San Antonio FC	24	(2)
2024	North Carolina FC	22	(0)
2025–	FC Tulsa	49	(4)
- * Club domestic league appearances and goals as of November 10, 2026

Lamar DeShawn Batista (born March 7, 1998) is an American professional soccer player who currently plays for FC Tulsa in USL Championship.

== Early life and education ==
Batista was born on March 7, 1998, in Waco, Texas. He was adopted at the age of 3, and was raised in Oklahoma City, Oklahoma.

Batista spent one season playing college soccer at the UC Santa Barbara in 2016.

== Career ==
Batista signed with the United Soccer League side Portland Timbers 2 in March 2017.

On February 21, 2019, Batista signed with Los Angeles FC in Major League Soccer. He spent the majority of the 2019 on loan at Phoenix Rising FC in the USL Championship and FC Tucson in USL League One.

After one season with North Texas SC, Batista joined USL Championship side Colorado Springs Switchbacks FC ahead of the 2021 season. On August 6, 2021, Batista moved on loan to fellow USL Championship side OKC Energy for the remainder of the season.

On January 31, 2022, Batista became the second player to sign with Rochester New York FC ahead of their inaugural season in MLS Next Pro.

Batista joined FC Tulsa on January 1, 2025.

== Career statistics ==
As of August 8, 2024

Appearances and goals by club, season and competition
Club	Season	League			Cup (Note: Appearances in U.S. Open Cup)		Playoffs		Total	
Club	Season	Division	Apps	Goals	Apps	Goals	Apps	Goals	Apps	Goals
Portland Timbers 2	2017	USL	21	0	—	—	—	—	21	0
Portland Timbers 2	2018	USL	22	1	—	—	1	0	23	1
Portland Timbers 2	Total		43	1	—	—	1	0	44	1
Portland Timbers	2017	MLS	—	—	1	0	—	—	1	0
Los Angeles FC	2019	MLS	—	—	—	—	—	—	—	—
Phoenix Rising (loan)	2019	USL Championship	2	0	—	—	—	—	2	0
FC Tucson (loan)	2019	USL League One	18	0	—	—	—	—	18	0
North Texas SC	2020	USL League One	5	0	—	—	—	—	5	0
Colorado Springs Switchbacks	2021	USL Championship	3	0	—	—	—	—	3	0
OKC Energy (loan)	2021	USL Championship	15	1	—	—	—	—	15	1
Rochester New York	2022	MLS Next Pro	22	1	2	0	1	0	25	1
San Antonio FC	2023	USL Championship	24	2	1	0	1	0	26	2
North Carolina FC	2024	USL Championship	15	0	—	—	—	—	15	0
Career Total			147	5	4	0	3	0	154	5
