= Oneok Field =

Baseball stadium in Tulsa, Oklahoma, U.S.

ONEOK Field

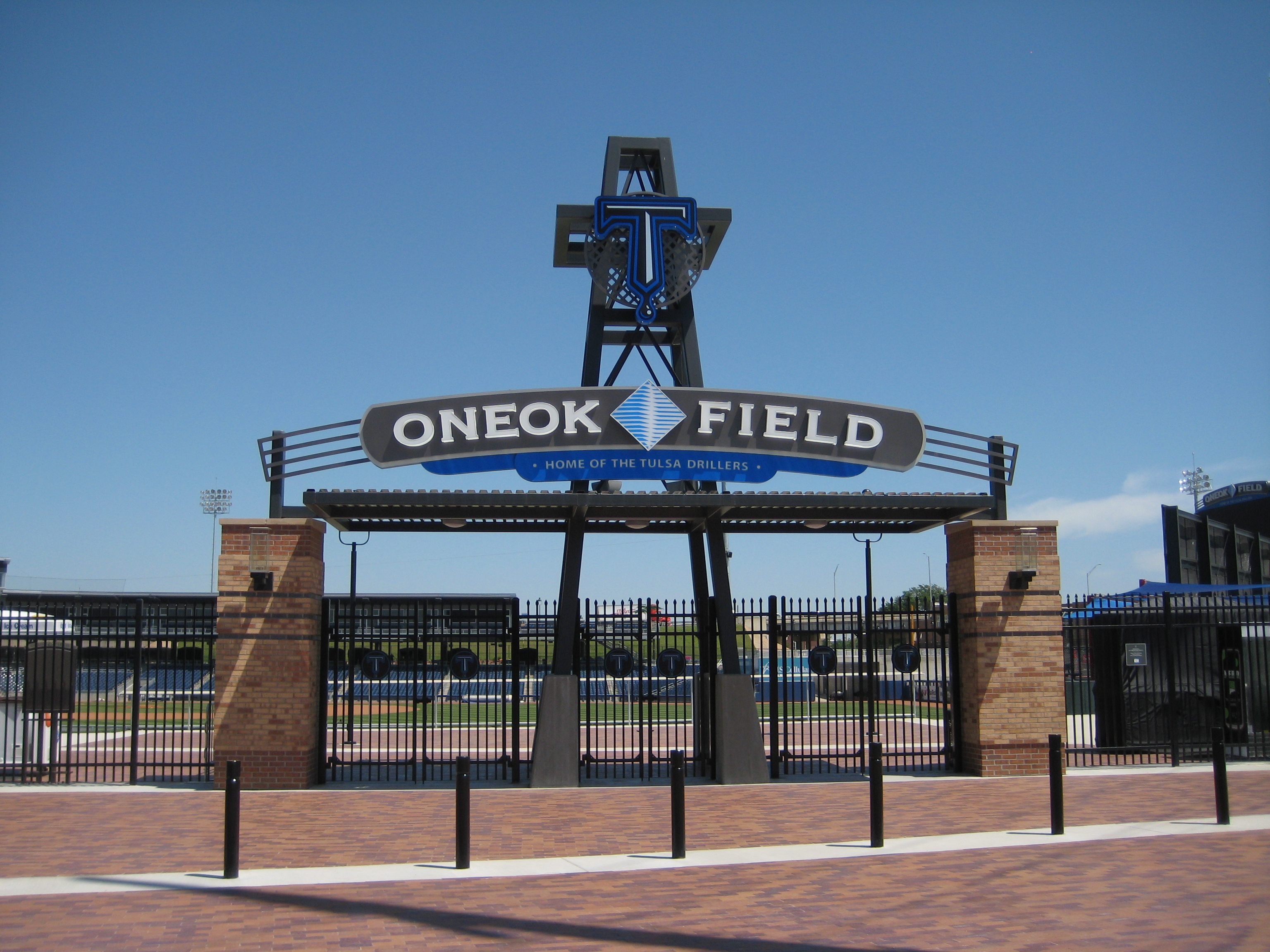

- Location within Oklahoma Location within the United States
- Location: 201 North Elgin Avenue; Tulsa, Oklahoma, United States; 74120
- Coordinates: 36°9′35″N 95°59′17″W
- Owner: Tulsa Stadium Trust
- Operator: Tulsa Drillers, Inc.
- Capacity: 7,833
- Surface: TifSport Bermuda grass
- Field size: Left field – 330 feet (101 m); Left-center – 381 feet (116 m); Center field – 400 feet (122 m); Right-center – 371 feet (113 m); Right field – 307 feet (94 m)

Construction
- Groundbreaking: December 19, 2008
- Opened: April 8, 2010
- Cost: $39.2 million ($57.9 million in 2025 dollars)
- Architect: Populous
- Project managers: Stonebridge Group, LLC.
- Structural engineer: Thornton Tomasetti
- Services engineers: Faith Technologies, Inc.
- General contractor: Manhattan Construction Company

Tenants
- Tulsa Drillers (TL) (2010–present); FC Tulsa (USLC) (2015–present)

ONEOK Field (/ˈwʌnoʊk/ WUN-ohk) is a baseball park in Tulsa, Oklahoma, United States. Located in the historic Greenwood district adjacent to downtown Tulsa, it is the home of the Tulsa Drillers of the Texas League. The stadium is named for ONEOK.

ONEOK Field has also been the home of FC Tulsa of the USL Championship since 2015.

== Construction ==
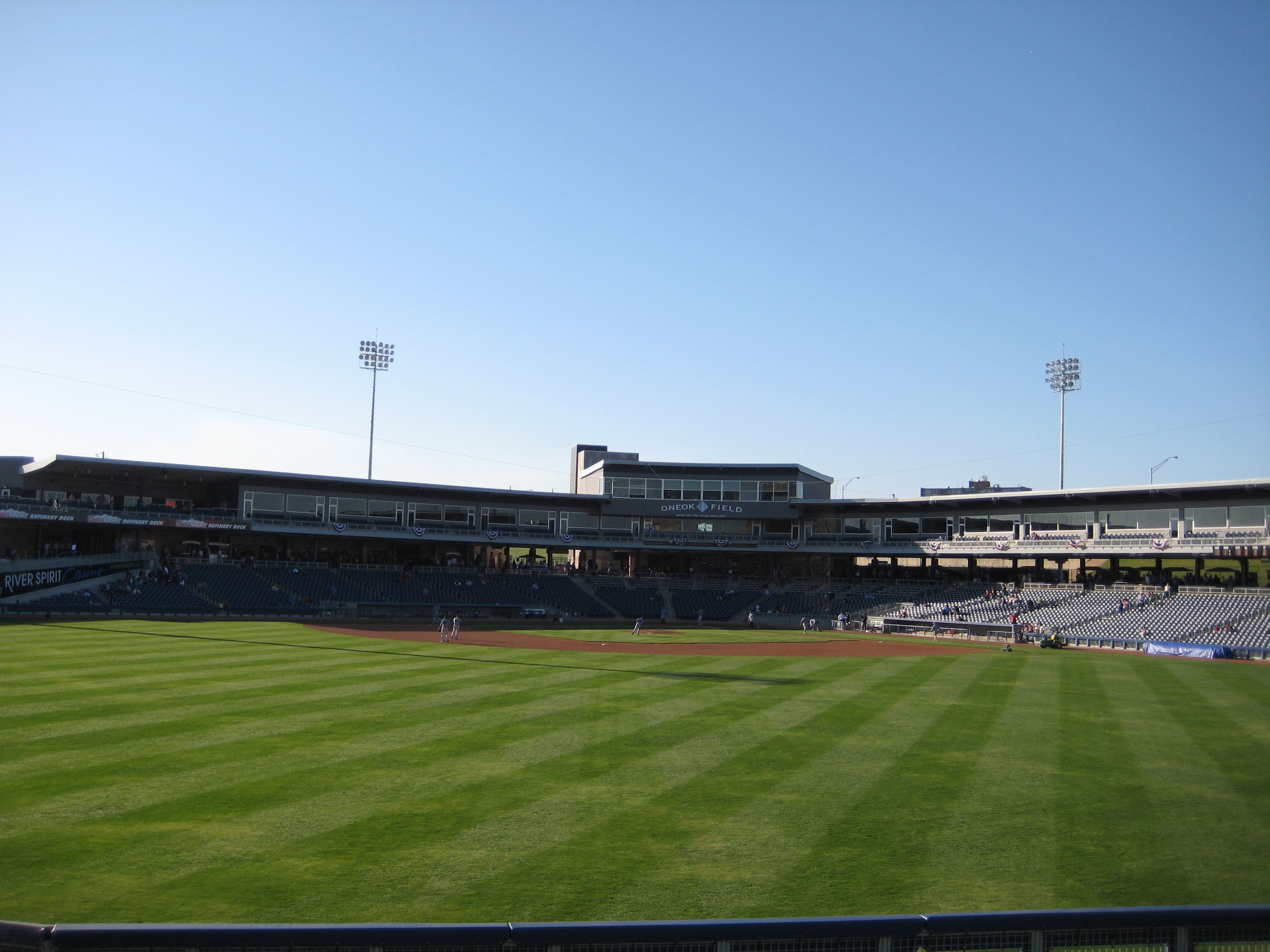
A view of Oneok Field from the outfield

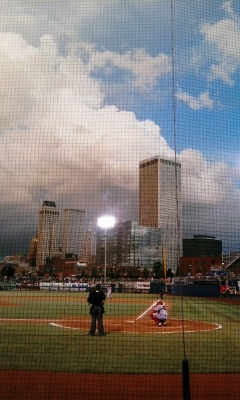
View of the Tulsa skyline from behind the Oneok Field home plate

The Drillers, who then played at Drillers Stadium on the Tulsa County Fairgrounds, began looking for a replacement ballpark in about 1998; at one point they signed a non-binding letter of intent to move to the Tulsa suburb of Jenks, before efforts by then-Tulsa mayor Kathy Taylor and others led to the Drillers deciding to proceed with a downtown stadium. The Drillers announced the move on June 26, 2008. The future of the stadium was for a time threatened by the financial collapse of its largest donor, SemGroup. However, groundbreaking for the new ballpark went forward on December 19, 2008. On January 12, 2009, Oneok, Inc. and the Oneok Foundation announced that they would pay $5 million USD to obtain the 20-year naming rights for the new baseball park.

The Drillers played their first game in the new ballpark on Thursday, April 8, 2010, losing 7-0 to the Corpus Christi Hooks before a crowd of 8,665 (more than 800 over official capacity). The first pitch at the stadium was thrown by country music star, Tim McGraw.

== Features ==
Oneok Field was designed by architect firm Populous of Kansas City, Missouri and constructed by Manhattan Construction Company. The stadium has an official capacity of 7,833, but is capable of holding over 9,000 for special events. On November 22, 2025, the stadium set its record attendance of 9,507, for the USL Championship Final between FC Tulsa and Pittsburgh Riverhounds SC. It has 23 suites and a playing field recessed about 13 feet below street level. With a construction cost of $39.2 million, the project also included the purchase of adjacent land for complementary development, for a total project budget of $60 million.

The new ballpark was intended to be more directly connected to its urban surroundings than was the old stadium at the fairgrounds, and also to have many of the same kinds of luxury amenities available in a major-league ballpark, both for fans and for the players and coaches.
