= Taylor Calheira =

American soccer player (born 2002)

Personal information
- Date of birth: April 26, 2002 (age 24)
- Place of birth: Towson, Maryland, United States
- Height: 6 ft 1 in (1.85 m)
- Position: Striker

Team information
- Current team: Sporting Kansas City
- Number: 19

College career
Years	Team	Apps	(Gls)
2020–2023	UMBC Retrievers	61	(32)

Senior career*
Years	Team	Apps	(Gls)
2022–2023	Christos FC		
2024	New York City FC II	24	(14)
2025	FC Tulsa	28	(15)
2026–	Sporting Kansas City	26	(5)
2026–	Sporting Kansas City II	3	(0)
- * Club domestic league appearances and goals as of November 12, 2026

Taylor Calheira (born April 26, 2002) is an American professional soccer player who plays as a striker for Sporting Kansas City of Major League Soccer.

== Career ==
=== Early life and college ===
Calheira, whose father is former Brazilian footballer Adauto Neto, attended Concordia Preparatory School where he was a four-year varsity soccer player. With Concordia, Calheira earned All-America, All-State and The Baltimore Sun All-Metro honors in 2019, and led the metro area with 33 goals.

In 2020, Calheira attended the University of Maryland, Baltimore County to play college soccer, where he went on to score 32 goals and tally 16 assists in 61 appearances. He became the first player since 2013 to be awarded American East First Team honors in three consecutive years.

While at college, Calheira also competed in the National Premier Soccer League and USL League Two with Christos FC in both 2022 and 2023. In 2023, he earned player of the year and golden boot honors in the Chesapeake Region.

=== Professional ===
On December 19, 2023, Calheira was selected 66th overall in the 2024 MLS SuperDraft by New York City FC. In March 2024, he was announced as a new signing for New York City FC's MLS Next Pro side, where he went on to score 14 goals in 24 regular season games and earned a spot in the MLS NEXT Pro Best XI for 2024. He also netted 3 goals in 5 Lamar Hunt US Open Cup fixtures in the 2024 season as the team got to the quarter finals.

On January 30, 2025, USL Championship side FC Tulsa signed Calheira from New York City FC II for an undisclosed transfer fee.

In February 2026, Major League Soccer club Sporting Kansas City announced that they had signed Calheira to a contract through the 2027–2028 season after acquiring him via transfer from FC Tulsa.
