= 2026 San Antonio FC season =

San Antonio FC
2026 season
- Owner: Spurs Sports & Entertainment
- Head coach: Carlos Llamosa
- Stadium: Toyota Field
- USLC: Western Conference: 6th
- USLC Playoffs: Conference Quarter-Finals
- U.S. Open Cup: Second Round
- USL Cup: Semi-Finals
- Copa Tejas: 2nd
- Copa Tejas Shield: 4th
- Highest home attendance: 7,742 vs El Paso Locomotive FC (August 15)
- Lowest home attendance: 5,160 vs FC Tulsa (September 5)
- Average home league attendance: 6,166
Home colors	Away colors

The 2026 San Antonio FC season was the club's eleventh season of existence. Including the San Antonio Thunder of the original NASL and the former San Antonio Scorpions of the second incarnation of the North American Soccer League, it was the 17th season of professional soccer in the city of San Antonio. The club played in the USL Championship, the second division of the United States soccer league system, and participated in the U.S. Open Cup, as well as the third edition of the USL Cup.

== Club ==
=== Coaching staff ===
Position	Staff
Head coach	(Colombia) Carlos Llamosa
Assistant coach	(United States) Fredy Herrera
Assistant coach	(Mexico) Juan Lamadrid
Equipment Manager	(United States) Rashad Moore
Head athletic trainer	(United States) Jesse Lowrance
Assistant Athletic Trainer	(United States) Alex Saldana

=== Other information ===
Owner	(United States) Spurs Sports & Entertainment
Chairman	(United States) Peter J. Holt
Sporting Director	(United States) Marco Ferruzzi
Ground (capacity and dimensions)	Toyota Field (8,200 / 110x70 yards)
Training Ground	S.T.A.R. Soccer Complex

Source: San Antonio FC

=== Roster ===
As of September 25, 2026

Squad No.	Name	Nationality	Position(s)	Previous club	Since	Date of Birth (Age)
Goalkeepers
0	Joey Batrouni	(United States)	GK	(United States) University of Virginia	2025	September 13, 2002 (age 24)
1	Richard Sánchez	(Mexico)	GK	(United States) Memphis 901	2024	April 5, 1994 (age 32)
31	Daniel Namani	(United States)	GK	(United States) Houston FC	2026	December 13, 1996 (age 29)
50	Victor Velazquez	(United States)	GK	(United States) SAFC Pro Academy	2026	May 17, 2008 (age 18)
Defenders
3	Mitchell Taintor	(United States)	DF	(United States) Sacramento Republic FC	2022	September 11, 1994 (age 32)
4	Nelson Blanco	(El Salvador)	DF	(United States) North Carolina FC	2024	August 17, 1999 (age 27)
5	Alexis Souahy	(Comoros)	DF	(United States) FC Tulsa	2025	January 13, 1995 (age 31)
13	Akeem Ward	(United States)	DF	(United States) Colorado Springs Switchbacks FC	2026	January 5, 1996 (age 30)
17	Danny Barbir	(United States)	DF	(United States) Lexington SC	2026	January 31, 1998 (age 28)
21	Alex Crognale	(United States)	DF	(United States) Birmingham Legion	2025	August 27, 1994 (age 32)
22	Emil Cuello	(Argentina)	DF	(United States) Phoenix Rising FC	2026	January 2, 1997 (age 29)
23	Rece Buckmaster	(United States)	DF	(United States) Hartford Athletic	2024	July 7, 1996 (age 30)
43	Tiago Suarez	(United States)	DF	(United States) New England Revolution	2026	April 23, 2005 (age 21)
48	Angel Mercado	(Puerto Rico)	DF	(United States) SAFC Pro Academy	2026	September 6, 2007 (age 19)
Midfielders
6	Curt Calov	(United States)	MF	(United States) Minnesota United FC 2	2026	November 11, 2003 (age 23)
7	Luke Haakenson	(United States)	MF	(United States) Nashville SC	2024	September 10, 1997 (age 29)
8	Nicky Hernandez	(United States)	MF	(United States) New Mexico United	2025	September 21, 1998 (age 28)
10	Jorge Hernández	(Mexico)	MF	(Belgium) KV Mechelen	2023	November 8, 2000 (age 26)
14	Lucio Berron	(Argentina)	MF	(United States) Creighton University	2025	October 5, 2001 (age 25)
15	Mikey Maldonado	(United States)	MF	(United States) North Carolina FC	2026	July 2, 1998 (age 28)
55	Dmitrii Erofeev	(Russia)	MF	(Russia) FC Dynamo-2 Moscow	2025	July 29, 2006 (age 20)
Forwards
9	Santiago Patiño	(Colombia)	FW	(Sudan) Al-Merrikh SC	2025	March 10, 1997 (age 29)
11	Alex Greive	(New Zealand)	FW	(Republic of Ireland) Bohemians	2025	May 13, 1999 (age 27)
19	Cristian Parano	(Argentina)	FW	(United States) Sacramento Republic FC	2026	August 16, 1999 (age 27)
24	EJ Johnson	(United States)	FW	(United States) Oakland Roots SC	2026	May 11, 2003 (age 23)
32	Luis Andres Paredes	(Colombia)	FW	(Colombia) Millonarios	2026	November 23, 1992 (age 33)
45	Leonides Urrutia	(United States)	FW	(United States) SAFC Pro Academy	2026	November 7, 2007 (age 19)
70	Diogo Pacheco	(United States)	FW	(United States) FC Tulsa	2025	September 13, 1998 (age 28)
77	Lilian Ricol	(France)	FW	(United States) Fort Wayne FC	2026	October 23, 2002 (age 24)
99	Christian Sorto	(United States)	FW	(United States) El Paso Locomotive FC	2026	January 19, 2000 (age 26)

USL Academy contract

== Player movement ==
=== In ===
Pos	Player	Previous club	Fee	Date	Source
MF	(United States) Mikey Maldonado	(United States) North Carolina FC	Free Transfer	December 9, 2025	
DF	(United States) Akeem Ward	(United States) Colorado Springs Switchbacks FC	Free Transfer	December 10, 2025	
FW	(Argentina) Cristian Parano	(United States) Sacramento Republic FC	Free Transfer	December 17, 2025	
FW	(United States) Christian Sorto	(United States) El Paso Locomotive FC	Free Transfer	December 19, 2025	
DF	(United States) Danny Barbir	(United States) Lexington SC	Free Transfer	February 3, 2026	
DF	(Argentina) Emil Cuello	(United States) Phoenix Rising FC	Free Transfer	February 16, 2026	
DF	(Puerto Rico) Angel Mercado	(United States) SAFC Pro Academy	Free Transfer	March 6, 2026	
FW	(United States) Leonides Urrutia	(United States) SAFC Pro Academy	Free Transfer	March 6, 2026	
GK	(United States) Victor Velazquez	(United States) SAFC Pro Academy	Free Transfer	March 6, 2026	
MF	(United States) Landry Walker	(United States) SAFC Pro Academy	Free Transfer	April 10, 2026	
FW	(United States) EJ Johnson	(United States) Oakland Roots SC	Free Transfer	April 17, 2026	
FW	(France) Lilian Ricol	(United States) Fort Wayne FC	Undisclosed	August 14, 2026	
FW	(Colombia) Luis Andres Paredes	Free Agent	Undisclosed	August 26, 2026	
GK	(United States) Daniel Namani	Free Agent	Undisclosed	September 9, 2026	

=== Out ===
Pos	Player	Transferred To	Fee	Date	Source
FW	(United States) Juan Agudelo	Retired		October 25, 2025	
MF	(Somalia) Mohamed Omar	(United States) Indy Eleven	Released from club	December 1, 2025	
GK	(United States) Daniel Namani		Released from club	December 1, 2025	
MF	(Colombia) Luis Andres Paredes		Released from club	December 1, 2025	
DF	(Colombia) Jimmy Medranda	(Colombia) Llaneros F.C.	Released from club	January 1, 2026	
FW	(United States) Kyle Linhares	(United States) One Knoxville SC	Released from club	January 17, 2026	
DF	(Trinidad and Tobago) Shannon Gomez	(United States) Tormenta FC	Released from club	January 20, 2026	
FW	(United States) Jake LaCava	(United States) New Mexico United	Released from club	January 21, 2026	
MF	(United States) Juan Sebastian Osorio	(United States) FC Naples	Released from club	January 21, 2026	
MF	(United States) Landry Walker	(United States) Huntsville City FC	Free Transfer	September 9, 2026	

=== Loan in ===
Pos	Player	Loaned From	Start	End	Source
DF	(United States) Tiago Suarez	(United States) New England Revolution	January 23, 2026	End of season	
MF	(United States) Curt Calov	(United States) Minnesota United FC 2	February 20, 2026	End of season	

=== Loan Out ===
Pos	Player	Loaned To	Start	End	Source
FW	(United States) EJ Johnson	(United States) Corpus Christi FC	August 19, 2026	End of Season	

== Non-competitive results ==
=== Preseason ===
The full preseason schedule was announced on January 21, 2026.

January 23 1	Austin FC	0-0	San Antonio FC	Austin, Texas
		Report

February 4 2	Houston Dynamo	2-0	San Antonio FC	Houston, Texas
11:00 am CST		Report

February 14 3	FC Tulsa	0-0	San Antonio FC	Dallas, Texas
		Report

February 18 4	San Antonio FC	3-1	UIW	San Antonio, Texas
11:00 am CST	Leo Urrutia; Dmitrii Erofeev; Dmitrii Erofeev	Report		Stadium: Toyota Field

February 21 5	San Antonio FC	5-2	Houston Dynamo 2	San Antonio, Texas
12:00 pm CST		Report		Stadium: Toyota Field

February 28 6	San Antonio FC	1-0	Corpus Christi FC	San Antonio, Texas
12:00 pm CST	Hernandez	Report		Stadium: Toyota Field

=== Friendlies ===
September 29 Friendly	San Antonio FC (United States)	0-7	(Germany) SV Darmstadt 98	San Antonio, Texas
		Report		Stadium: Toyota Field
Note: The match was originally scheduled for March 25.

== Competitions ==
=== Overall ===
Position in the Western Conference

Competition	Started round	Current position / round	Final position / round	First match	Last match
USL Championship Western Conference	—	—	6th	March 7, 2026	October 24, 2026
U.S. Open Cup	First Round	—	Second Round	March 18, 2026	April 1, 2026
USL Cup	Group Stage	—	Semifinal	April 25, 2026	September 8, 2026

Updated to match played October 30, 2026
Source: Competitions

=== Overview ===
Competition	Record							
Competition	G	W	D	L	GF	GA	GD	Win %
USL Championship	30	11	12	7	32	30	+2	36.67
USL Championship Playoffs	1	0	0	1	1	2	−1	0.00
U.S. Open Cup	2	1	0	1	6	1	+5	50.00
USL Cup	6	5	0	1	7	2	+5	83.33
Total	39	17	12	10	46	35	+11	43.59

Updated to match played October 30, 2026
Source: Competitions

=== USL Championship ===
==== Standings ====
Pos	Team	Pld	W	L	T	GF	GA	GD	Pts	Qualification
4	Lexington SC	30	14	10	6	57	39	+18	48	Playoffs
5	Colorado Springs Switchbacks FC	30	13	9	8	44	38	+6	47	Playoffs
6	San Antonio FC	30	11	7	12	32	30	+2	45	Playoffs
7	FC Tulsa	30	11	9	10	34	31	+3	43	Playoffs
8	Phoenix Rising FC	30	11	10	9	45	46	−1	42	Playoffs

Updated to match(es) played on October 24, 2026. Source: USL Championship Standings
Rules for classification: 1) total wins against conference opponents; 2) goal differential against conference opponents; 3) goals scored against conference opponents; 4) head-to-head points against conference opponents; 5) points per game against conference opponents; 6) points per game against non-conference opponents; 7) fewest disciplinary points; 8) coin toss or drawing of lots

==== Results summary ====
Overall								Home						Away					
Pld	W	D	L	GF	GA	GD	Pts	W	D	L	GF	GA	GD	W	D	L	GF	GA	GD
30	11	12	7	32	30	+2	45	7	5	3	17	12	+5	4	7	4	15	18	−3

Last updated: October 24, 2026.

==== Match results ====
On December 16, 2025, the USL Championship released the schedule for all 25 teams for both the regular season and the USL Cup.

All times are in Central Standard Time.

March 7 1	San Antonio FC	2–1	Phoenix Rising FC	San Antonio, Texas
7:30 PM	Hernandez 6'; Crognale 49'	Report	Scearce 54' (pen.)	Stadium: Toyota Field; Attendance: 6,512; Referee: Brandon Stevis

March 14 2	FC Tulsa	0-0	San Antonio FC	Tulsa, Oklahoma
7:00 PM		Report		Stadium: ONEOK Field; Attendance: 5,717; Referee: Abdou Ndiaye

March 21 3	San Antonio FC	1–0	New Mexico United	San Antonio, Texas
7:30 PM	Hernandez 74'	Report		Stadium: Toyota Field; Attendance: 5,797; Referee: Servando Berna Rico

March 29 4	San Antonio FC	2–0	Lexington SC	San Antonio, Texas
3:00 PM	Hernandez 28'; Dmitriy Erofeev 75'	Report		Stadium: Toyota Field; Attendance: 5,905; Referee: Brad Jensen

April 4 5	Monterey Bay FC	0–0	San Antonio FC	Seaside, California
9:00 PM		Report		Stadium: Cardinale Stadium; Attendance: 3,430; Referee: Edson Carvajal

April 8 6	Orange County SC	2–0	San Antonio FC	Irvine, California
9:00 PM	Mackinnon 11'; Bazini 34'	Report		Stadium: Championship Soccer Stadium; Attendance: 2,979; Referee: Natalie Simon

April 11 7	San Antonio FC	0–0	Miami FC	San Antonio, Texas
7:30 PM		Report	Tunbridge (red card) 72'	Stadium: Toyota Field; Attendance: 5,758; Referee: Ekaterina Koroleva

April 18 8	El Paso Locomotive FC	2–3	San Antonio	El Paso, Texas
8:00 p.m.	Rubín 45+2'; Avila 55'	Report	Crognale 16'; Hernandez 43'; Parano 90'	Stadium: Southwest University Park; Referee: Rodrigo Albuquerque

May 2 9	San Antonio FC	3–3	Colorado Springs Switchbacks FC	San Antonio, Texas
7:30 PM	Hernandez 34'; Hernandez 83'; Crognale 90+7'	Report	Yosuke Hanya 25'; Sadam Masereka 46'; Curt Calov (OG 90+10)	Stadium: Toyota Field; Attendance: 5,570; Referee: Muhammad Hassan

May 9 10	Phoenix Rising FC	1–1	San Antonio FC	Phoenix, Arizona
9:00 PM	Dennis (red card) 44'; Pelayo 80'	Report	Erofeev 45+3'	Stadium: Phoenix Rising Soccer Stadium; Attendance: 4,530; Referee: Matthew Corrigan

May 23 11	San Antonio FC	2–1	Sacramento Republic FC	San Antonio, Texas
7:30 PM	Christian Sorto 27'; Dmitri Erofeev 33'	Report	Forster Ajago 55'	Stadium: Toyota Field; Attendance: 5,676; Referee: Robert Vincze

May 27 12	Sporting Club Jacksonville	4–4	San Antonio FC	Jacksonville, Florida
6:30 PM	Emil Jääskeläinen 6'; Kieran Sadlier 23' (pen.); Kieran Sadlier 45' (pen.); Rafferty Pedder 89'	Report	Dmitriy Erofeev 48'; Christian Sorto 51'; Akeem Ward 54'; Christian Sorto 76'	Stadium: Hodges Stadium; Attendance: 808; Referee: Edson Carvajal

June 13 13	Lexington SC	2-0	San Antonio FC	Lexington, Kentucky
6:00 PM	Blaine Ferri 48'; Braudilio Rodrigues 68'	Report		Stadium: Lexington SC Stadium; Attendance: 4,010; Referee: John Griggs

June 24 14	Colorado Springs Switchbacks FC	1–2	San Antonio FC	Colorado Springs, Colorado
8:00 PM	Bennett 15'	Report	Erofeev 29'; Crognale 70'	Stadium: Weidner Field; Attendance: 5,199; Referee: Calin Radosav

July 4 15	San Antonio FC	0-0	Monterey Bay FC	San Antonio, Texas
8:00 PM		Report		Stadium: Toyota Field; Attendance: 7,074; Referee: Sergii Demianchuk

July 18 16	San Antonio FC	1-2	Las Vegas Lights FC	San Antonio, Texas
8:00 PM	Emil Cuello 6'	Report	Johnny Rodriguez 47'; Abraham Okyere 79'	Stadium: Toyota Field; Attendance: 5,983; Referee: Brandon Stevis

July 25 17	Brooklyn FC	0-1	San Antonio FC	Brooklyn, New York
6:00 PM		Report	Cristian Parano 34'	Stadium: Maimonides Park; Attendance: 1,907; Referee: Drew Klemp

July 31 18	San Antonio FC	3–1	Indy Eleven	San Antonio, Texas
8:00 PM	Cuello 25'; Parano 48', 70'	Report	O'Brien 90+4'	Stadium: Toyota Field; Attendance: 6,145; Referee: Gerald Flores

August 8 19	Louisville City FC	1-1	San Antonio FC	Louisville, Kentucky
7:00 PM	Mukwelle Akale 12'	Report	Parano 78'	Stadium: Lynn Family Stadium; Attendance: 12,358; Referee: Rodrigo Albuquerque

August 15 20	San Antonio FC	0-3	El Paso Locomotive FC	San Antonio, Texas
8:00 PM		Report	Alex Mendez 20', 39'; Jimmy Farkarlun 44'	Stadium: Toyota Field; Attendance: 7,742; Referee: Matthew Thompson

August 22 21	San Antonio FC	0-1	Oakland Roots SC	San Antonio, Texas
8:00 PM		Report	Peter Wilson (pen.), 90+3'	Stadium: Toyota Field; Attendance: 6,101; Referee: Cristian Campo Hernández

August 30 22	New Mexico United	1-2	San Antonio FC	Albuquerque, New Mexico
8:00 PM	Dayonn Harris 46'	Report	Kipp Keller , 46' (o.g.); Nicky Hernandez 52'	Stadium: Isotopes Park; Attendance: 8,335; Referee: Matthew Corrigan

September 5 23	San Antonio FC	0-0	FC Tulsa	San Antonio, Texas
7:30 PM		Report		Stadium: Toyota Field; Attendance: 5,160; Referee: Lukasz Szpala

September 11 24	Colorado Springs Switchbacks FC	2–1	San Antonio FC	Colorado Springs, Colorado
9:00 PM	Fjeldberg 67'; Bennett 70'	Report	Cuello 82'	Stadium: Weidner Field; Attendance: 5,920; Referee: Ekaterina Koroleva

September 20 25	Sacramento Republic FC	0-0	San Antonio FC	Sacramento, California
6:00 PM		Report		Stadium: Heart Health Park; Attendance: 11,569; Referee: Joshua Encarnación

September 26 26	San Antonio FC	0-0	Tampa Bay Rowdies	San Antonio, Texas
7:30 PM		Report		Stadium: Toyota Field; Attendance: 5,848; Referee: Calin Radosav

October 3 27	Las Vegas Lights FC	1-0	San Antonio FC	Las Vegas, Nevada
9:30 PM	Manuel Arteaga 45+3'	Report		Stadium: Cashman Field; Attendance: 2,669; Referee: Abdou Ndiaye

October 10 28	Oakland Roots SC	0-0	San Antonio FC	Oakland, California
7:00 PM		Report		Stadium: Oakland Coliseum; Attendance: 9,718; Referee: Corbyn May

October 17 29	San Antonio FC	1-0	New Mexico United	San Antonio, Texas
7:30 PM	Calov 29'; Haakenson (red card) 80'	Report	Bailey (red card) 80'	Stadium: Toyota Field; Attendance: 7,154; Referee: Muhammad Kaleia

October 24 30	San Antonio FC	2-1	Orange County SC	San Antonio, Texas
7:30 PM	Cuello 15'; Parano 58'	Report	Chris Hegardt 86'	Stadium: Toyota Field; Attendance: 6,069; Referee: Elvis Osmanovic

=== USL Championship playoffs ===
As the sixth seed in the Western Conference, San Antonio qualified for the 2026 USL Championship playoffs, scheduled away against El Paso Locomotive FC. Playing in El Paso, San Antonio lost 2–1, concluding the club's season.

October 30 Conference Quarterfinals	El Paso Locomotive FC	2–1	San Antonio FC	El Paso, Texas
9:00 PM ET	Rubín 14'; Twumasi (yellow card) 20'; Ortiz (yellow card) 34'; Ruiz (yellow card) 45'; Avila (yellow card) 45'; Alfaro 54' (yellow card) 74'; Dollenmayer (yellow card) 88'; Coronado (yellow card) 90+2'	Report	Patiño (yellow card) 30'; Berrón (yellow card) 37'; Crognale (yellow card) 65'; Pacheco 84'; Hernández (yellow card) 90+4'	Stadium: Southwest University Park; Attendance: 4,078; Referee: Jeremy Scheer

=== U.S. Open Cup ===
San Antonio entered in the First Round of the 2026 U.S. Open Cup, joining the competition at the same time as 16 other USL Championship teams. Their first-round game against the amateur team ASC New Stars was played on Wednesday, March 18 at Toyota Field. They were drawn at home against FC Tulsa for a Second Round game on April 1, where they ultimately bowed out of the tournament after a loss in added extra time.

March 18 First Round	San Antonio FC	6–0	ASC New Stars	San Antonio, Texas
8:30 PM ET	Souahy 15'; Calov 37'; Sorto 59' (pen.), 68'; Erofeev 64'; Johnson 73'			Stadium: Toyota Field; Attendance: 1,766; Referee: Edgar García

April 1 Second Round	San Antonio FC	0–1 (a.e.t.)	FC Tulsa	San Antonio, Texas
8:30 PM ET		Report	Cabral 105'	Stadium: Toyota Field; Attendance: 2,434; Referee: Muhammad Kaleia

==== USL Cup ====
San Antonio FC participated in the third edition of the USL Cup, the second edition to feature teams from both the USL Championship and League One.

==== Standings ====
Pos	Lg	Team	Pld	W	PKW	PKL	L	GF	GA	GD	Pts	Qualification
1	USLC	San Antonio FC	4	3	1	0	0	5	1	+4	11	Advance to knockout stage
2	USLC	Birmingham Legion FC	4	2	1	1	0	7	2	+5	9	
3	USL1	One Knoxville SC	4	0	3	0	1	3	4	−1	6	
4	USLC	FC Tulsa	4	1	0	1	2	4	6	−2	4	
5	USL1	Corpus Christi FC	4	1	0	1	2	2	5	−3	4	

==== Group stage ====
April 25	San Antonio FC	0-0 (3-1 p)	Birmingham Legion FC	San Antonio, Texas
7:30 PM		Report		Stadium: Toyota Field; Attendance: 5,850; Referee: Atahan Yaya
	Penalties
	Taintor (penalty scored); Emil Cuello (penalty scored); Tiago Suarez (penalty missed); Hernández (penalty scored)		(penalty scored) Tyler Pasher; (penalty missed) Sebastian Saucedo; (penalty missed) Sebastian Tregarthen; (penalty missed) Romario Williams

May 16	One Knoxville SC	0–1	San Antonio FC	Knoxville, Tennessee
6:00 p.m.		Report	Suárez 45+4'	Stadium: Covenant Health Park; Attendance: 4,702

June 6	FC Tulsa	1-2	San Antonio FC	Tulsa, Oklahoma
7:30 PM	Luke Haakenson 51'; Mikey Maldonado 90+1'		Rémi Cabral 18'	Stadium: ONEOK Field; Attendance: 4,953; Referee: Nabil Bensalah

July 11	San Antonio FC	2-0	Chattanooga Red Wolves SC	San Antonio, Texas
8:00 PM	Santiago Patiño 45'; Curt Calov 45+1'	Report		Stadium: Toyota Field; Attendance: 5,255; Referee: Muhammad Kaleia

==== Knockouts ====
August 12 Quarter-finals	San Antonio FC	2-1	Miami FC	San Antonio, Texas
7:30 p.m.	Parano 44', 64'	Report	Arney Rocha 79'	Stadium: Toyota Field; Attendance: 6,092; Referee: Nabil Bensalah

September 8 Semi-finals	San Antonio FC	0–0 (7–8 p)	Louisville City FC	San Antonio, Texas
7:30 PM		Report		Stadium: Toyota Field; Attendance: 4,757; Referee: Brad Jensen
	Penalties
	Taintor (penalty missed); Maldonado (penalty scored); Cuello (penalty scored); Ricol (penalty scored); Hernández (penalty scored); Parano (penalty missed); Barbir (penalty scored); Ward (penalty scored); Crognale (penalty scored); Haakenson (penalty missed)		(penalty missed) Totsch; (penalty scored) E. Davila; (penalty scored) Wilson; (penalty scored) Huerman; (penalty scored) T. Davila; (penalty missed) McFadden; (penalty scored) Morris; (penalty scored) Showunmi; (penalty scored) Dayes; (penalty scored) Dia

== Statistics ==
=== Appearances ===
Discipline includes league, playoffs, and Open Cup play.

No.	Pos.	Name	League		Playoffs		U.S. Open Cup		USL Cup		Total		Discipline	
No.	Pos.	Name	Apps	Goals	Apps	Goals	Apps	Goals	Apps	Goals	Apps	Goals	Yellow card	Red card
0	GK	(United States) Joey Batrouni	28	0	1	0	1	0	3	0	33	0	4	1
1	GK	(Mexico) Richard Sánchez	3	0	0	0	1	0	3	0	7	0	1	0
3	DF	(United States) Mitchell Taintor	27	0	1	0	2	0	5	0	35	0	8	1
4	DF	(El Salvador) Nelson Blanco	23	0	1	0	2	0	5	0	31	0	7	0
5	DF	(Comoros) Alexis Souahy	4	0	0	0	1	1	2	0	7	1	1	0
6	MF	(United States) Curt Calov	21	1	1	0	2	1	4	1	28	3	3	0
7	MF	(United States) Luke Haakenson	14	0	0	0	1	0	4	1	19	1	0	1
8	MF	(United States) Nicky Hernandez	14	1	0	0	0	0	4	0	18	1	3	0
9	FW	(Colombia) Santiago Patiño	21	0	1	0	1	0	2	1	25	1	7	1
10	MF	(Mexico) Jorge Hernandez	25	5	1	0	2	0	4	0	32	5	13	0
13	DF	(United States) Akeem Ward	29	1	1	0	1	0	6	0	37	1	11	1
14	MF	(Argentina) Lucio Berrón	19	0	1	0	0	0	4	0	24	0	7	1
15	MF	(United States) Mikey Maldonado	28	0	0	0	2	0	5	1	36	1	9	0
17	DF	(United States) Danny Barbir	16	1	0	0	2	0	5	0	23	1	4	0
19	FW	(Argentina) Cristian Parano	26	6	1	0	2	0	3	2	32	8	4	0
21	DF	(United States) Alex Crognale	28	3	1	0	1	0	4	0	34	4	9	0
22	DF	(Argentina) Emil Cuello	26	4	1	0	2	0	5	0	34	4	7	0
23	DF	(United States) Rece Buckmaster	5	0	0	0	1	0	1	0	7	0	0	0
32	FW	(Colombia) Luis Andres Paredes	3	0	1	0	0	0	0	0	4	0	0	0
43	MF	(United States) Tiago Suarez	24	0	1	0	2	0	3	1	30	1	4	1
55	MF	(Russia) Dmitri Erofeev	15	4	0	0	2	1	3	0	20	6	3	0
70	FW	(Portugal) Diogo Pacheco	15	0	1	1	0	0	4	0	20	1	3	0
77	FW	(France) Lilian Ricol	7	0	0	0	0	0	1	0	8	0	1	0
99	FW	(El Salvador) Christian Sorto	23	3	1	0	2	2	5	0	31	5	3	0
Player who featured but departed the club on loan during the season:
24	FW	(United States) EJ Johnson	6	0	0	0	2	1	2	0	10	1	2	0

Last updated: October 30, 2026.
Source: San Antonio FC

=== Top scorers ===
The list is sorted by shirt number when total goals are equal.

Rnk	Pos	No.	Player	League	Playoffs	U.S. Open Cup	USL Cup	Total
1	FW	19	(Argentina) Cristian Parano	6	0	0	2	8
2	MF	55	(Russia) Dmitiriy Erofeev	5	0	1	0	6
3	MF	10	(Mexico) Jorge Hernandez	5	0	0	0	5
3	FW	99	(El Salvador) Christian Sorto	3	0	2	0	5
5	DF	21	(United States) Alex Crognale	4	0	0	0	4
5	DF	22	(Argentina) Emil Cuello	4	0	0	0	4
7	MF	6	(United States) Curt Calov	1	0	1	1	3
8	DF	13	(United States) Akeem Ward	1	0	0	0	1
8	DF	17	(United States) Danny Barbir	1	0	0	0	1
8	DF	43	(United States) Tiago Suarez	0	0	0	1	1
8	DF	5	(Comoros) Alexis Souahy	0	0	1	0	1
8	FW	24	(United States) EJ Johnson	0	0	1	0	1
8	MF	15	(United States) Mikey Maldonado	0	0	0	1	1
8	MF	7	(United States) Luke Haakenson	0	0	0	1	1
8	FW	9	(Colombia) Santiago Patiño	0	0	0	1	1
8	MF	8	(United States) Nicky Hernandez	1	0	0	0	1
8	FW	70	(Portugal) Diogo Pacheco	0	1	0	0	1
8	DF	4	(United States) Kipp Keller (o.g.)	1	0	0	0	1
TOTALS				32	1	6	7	46

Last updated: October 30, 2026.
Source: San Antonio FC

=== Clean sheets ===
The list is sorted by shirt number when total clean sheets are equal.

Rnk	No.	Player	League	Playoffs	U.S. Open Cup	USL Cup	Total
1	0	(United States) Joseph Batrouni	10	0	0	1	11
2	1	(Mexico) Richard Sánchez	1	0	1	3	5
TOTALS			11	0	1	4	16

Last updated: October 30, 2026.
Source: San Antonio FC
