= 2025 San Antonio FC season =

Season description for soccer club

San Antonio FC
2025 season
- Owner: Spurs Sports & Entertainment
- Head coach: Carlos Llamosa
- Stadium: Toyota Field
- USLC: Western Conference: 6th
- USLC Playoffs: Conference Quarter-Finals
- U.S. Open Cup: Third Round
- Copa Tejas: Champions
- Copa Tejas Shield: 4th
- Highest home attendance: 8,164 vs Monterey Bay FC (March 8)
- Lowest home attendance: 3,735 vs Colorado Springs Switchbacks FC (April 23)
- Biggest win: 3 goal margin (Two games)
- Biggest defeat: 0–4 (May 17, against Charleston Battery)
Home colors	Away colors

The 2025 San Antonio FC season was the club's tenth season of existence. Including the San Antonio Thunder of the original NASL and the former San Antonio Scorpions of the second incarnation of the North American Soccer League, it was the 16th season of professional soccer in the city of San Antonio. The club played in the USL Championship, the second division of the United States soccer league system, and participated in the U.S. Open Cup, as well as the second edition of the USL Cup, the first edition to have USL Championship clubs.

== Club ==
=== Coaching staff ===
Position	Staff
Head coach	(Colombia) Carlos Llamosa
Assistant coach	(United States) Fredy Herrera
Assistant coach	(Mexico) Juan Lamadrid
Equipment Manager	(United States) Rashad Moore
Head athletic trainer	(United States) Jesse Lowrance
Assistant Athletic Trainer	(United States) Alex Saldana

=== Other information ===
Owner	(United States) Spurs Sports & Entertainment
Chairman	(United States) Peter J. Holt
Sporting Director	(United States) Marco Ferruzzi
Ground (capacity and dimensions)	Toyota Field (8,200 / 110x70 yards)
Training Ground	S.T.A.R. Soccer Complex

Source: San Antonio FC

== Squad information ==
First team squad

As of March 13, 2025.

Squad No.	Name	Nationality	Position(s)	Date of Birth (Age)
Goalkeepers
1	Richard Sánchez	(Mexico)	GK	April 5, 1994 (age 32)
13	Daniel Namani	(United States)	GK	
50	Brandon Gongora	(United States)	GK	
60	Joey Batrouni	(United States)	GK	September 13, 2002 (age 24)
Defenders
2	Abdi Salim	(Somalia)	DF	April 1, 2001 (age 25)
3	Mitchell Taintor	(United States)	DF	September 11, 1994 (age 32)
4	Nelson Blanco	(El Salvador)	DF	August 17, 1999 (age 27)
5	Alexis Souahy	(Comoros)	DF	January 13, 1995 (age 31)
21	Alex Crognale	(United States)	DF	August 17, 1994 (age 32)
22	Shannon Gomez	(Trinidad and Tobago)	DF	October 5, 1996 (age 30)
23	Rece Buckmaster	(United States)	DF	July 7, 1996 (age 30)
53	Braylon Jernigan	(United States)	DF	September 17, 2007 (age 19)
77	Harvey Neville	(England)	DF	June 26, 2002 (age 24)
94	Jimmy Medranda	(Colombia)	DF	February 7, 1994 (age 32)
Midfielders
6	Mohamed Omar	(Somalia)	MF	January 22, 1999 (age 27)
7	Luke Haakenson	(United States)	MF	September 10, 1997 (age 29)
8	Nicky Hernandez	(United States)	MF	September 21, 1998 (age 28)
10	Jorge Hernández	(Mexico)	MF	November 8, 2000 (age 26)
14	Lucio Berrón	(Argentina)	MF	
18	Almir Soto	(Colombia)	MF	July 17, 1994 (age 32)
34	Juan Sebastian Osorio	(United States)	MF	
52	Dyllan Mendoza	(United States)	MF	November 8, 2006 (age 18)
55	Dmitrii Erofeev	(Russia)	MF	
Forwards
9	Jake LaCava	(United States)	FW	January 12, 2001 (age 25)
11	Alex Greive	(New Zealand)	FW	May 13, 1999 (age 27)
17	Juan Agudelo	(United States)	FW	November 23, 1992 (age 33)
32	Luis Andres Paredes	(Colombia)	FW	November 23, 1992 (age 33)
70	Diogo Pacheco	(United States)	FW	November 23, 1992 (age 33)
99	Santiago Patino	(Colombia)	FW	March 10, 1997 (age 29)

== Pre-season ==
January 25, 2025	Houston Dynamo	2–2	San Antonio FC	Houston, Texas
	Dorsey; Dueñas	Report	Crognale; 57'	Stadium: Houston Sports Park

February 1, 2025	San Antonio FC	2–0	UIW
	Haakenson; LaCava	Report

February 8, 2025	San Antonio FC	2–1	SMU	San Antonio, TX
	Agudelo; Haakenson	Report	Goal	Stadium: Toyota Field

February 15, 2025	Corpus Christi FC	1–3	San Antonio FC
7 p.m.	Agudelo 29' 39'; Pacheco 73'	Report	86'

February 22, 2025	San Antonio FC	2–1	El Paso Locomotive FC	San Antonio, TX
12:30 p.m.	Pacheco 3'; LaCava 52'	Report	71'	Stadium: Toyota Field

March 1, 2025	San Antonio FC	1–1	Houston Dynamo 2	San Antonio, TX
	Goal	Report	Erofeev	Stadium: Toyota Field

== Competitions ==
=== Overall ===
Position in the Western Conference

Competition	Started round	Current position / round	Final position / round	First match	Last match
USL Championship Western Conference	—	1st		March 8, 2025	October 25, 2025
U.S. Open Cup	Third Round	Eliminated	Third Round	April 15, 2025	
Jägermeister Cup	Group Stage	2nd		April 26, 2025	

Updated to match played March 29, 2025
Source: Competitions

=== Overview ===
Competition	Record							
Competition	G	W	D	L	GF	GA	GD	Win %
USL Championship	30	11	7	12	39	38	+1	36.67
USL Championship Playoffs	1	0	0	1	0	2	−2	0.00
U.S. Open Cup	1	0	0	1	0	1	−1	0.00
Jägermeister Cup	5	3	0	2	6	4	+2	60.00
Total	37	14	7	16	45	45	+0	37.84

Updated to match played May 3, 2025
Source: Competitions

=== USL Championship ===
==== Conference table ====
Western Conference

Pos	Team	Pld	W	L	T	GF	GA	GD	Pts	Qualification
4	El Paso Locomotive FC	30	10	9	11	47	45	+2	41	Playoffs
5	Phoenix Rising FC	30	9	8	13	48	48	0	40 (Note: Phoenix Rising FC are ahead of San Antonio FC on head-to-head points: PHX 6, SAN 0.)	Playoffs
6	San Antonio FC	30	11	12	7	39	38	+1	40	Playoffs
7	Orange County SC	30	10	11	9	44	45	−1	39	Playoffs
8	Colorado Springs Switchbacks FC	30	10	13	7	35	47	−12	37	Playoffs

Source: USL Championship Standings

==== Results summary ====
Overall								Home						Away					
Pld	W	D	L	GF	GA	GD	Pts	W	D	L	GF	GA	GD	W	D	L	GF	GA	GD
30	11	7	12	39	38	+1	40	7	2	6	23	17	+6	4	5	6	16	21	−5

Last updated: October 25, 2025.

==== Results by matchday ====
Position in the Western Conference

Round	1	2	3	4	5	6	7	8	9	10	11	12	13	14	15	16	17	18	19	20	21	22	23	24	25	26	27	28	29	30
Stadium	H	H	A	A	H	H	H	A	H	A	H	H	A	A	A	H	H	A	H	A	A	A	H	A	H	H	A	A	A	H
Result	W	W	W	W	L	L	W	D	L	L	D	W	D	L	W	W	L	D	L	D	D	L	W	W	D	L	L	L	L	W
Position	8	3	1	1	1	2	1	1	2	3	4	3	3	4	2	2	3	3	3	4	4	7	4	3	4	4	5	5	6	6

Updated to match(es) played on October 25, 2025. Source:
A = Away; H = Home; W = Win; D = Draw; L = Loss

==== Matches ====
The 2025 schedule was released on December 19, 2024. Home team is listed first, left to right.

Win Draw Loss Postponed

Kickoff times are in CDT (UTC-05) unless shown otherwise

March 8, 2025 1	San Antonio FC	1–0	Monterey Bay FC	San Antonio, Texas
7:30 p.m. CST	Medranda (yellow card); Pacheco 40'; Taintor (yellow card) 42'; N. Hernandez (yellow card) 85'	Report	Gnaulati (yellow card) 26'; Lyons (yellow card) 74'	Stadium: Toyota Field; Attendance: 8,164; Referee: Matthew Thompson

March 15, 2025 2	San Antonio FC	2–0	Pittsburgh Riverhounds SC	San Antonio, Texas
7:30 p.m. CST	de Jesus Soto (yellow card) 34'; J. Hernandez 54' (yellow card) 84'; Haakenson 88'	Report	Williams (yellow card) 42'; Ydrach (yellow card) 72'; Garcia (yellow card) 87'; Griffin (yellow card) 90+7'	Stadium: Toyota Field; Attendance: 5,876; Referee: Abdou Ndiaye

March 22, 2025 3	Oakland Roots	1–2	San Antonio FC	Oakland, CA
7:00 p.m. PST		Report		Stadium: Oakland-Alameda County Coliseum; Attendance: 26,575; Referee: Jeremy Scheer

March 29, 2025 4	Lexington SC	2–3	San Antonio FC	Lexington, Kentucky
7:00 p.m. EDT	Firmino 11' (yellow card) 19'; Burke 16'; Sargeant (yellow card) 26'; Djeffal (yellow card) 72'	Report	Medranda 23'; J. Hernandez 27'; LaCava 82' (yellow card) 90+2'	Stadium: Lexington SC Stadium; Attendance: 4,437; Referee: John Matto

April 6, 2025 5	San Antonio FC	1–2	Phoenix Rising	San Antonio, Texas
3:00 p.m. CST	J. Hernandez 65', (yellow card) 90+6'; Blanco (yellow card) 79'; Crognale (yellow card) 83'	Report	Okello (yellow card) 38'; Cabral 65'; Henry (yellow card) 64'; Margaritha 67'	Stadium: Toyota Field; Attendance: 7,498; Referee: Greg Dopka

April 12, 2025 6	San Antonio FC	1–2	Miami FC	San Antonio, Texas
7:30 p.m. CST	Crognale 65'	Report	Knutson 25'; Bonfiglio 27'	Stadium: Toyota Field; Attendance: 7,078; Referee: Alex Beehler

April 23, 2025 7	San Antonio FC	3–2	Colorado Springs Switchbacks FC	San Antonio, Texas
7:30 p.m. CST	Berron (yellow card) 48'; J. Hernandez 51'; Omar 58'; Greive 64'; Medranda (yellow card) 71'; Pacheco (yellow card) 87'	Report	Micaletto (yellow card) 3'; Real 21' (red card) 56'; Dhillon 42'; Rocha (yellow card) 88'; Tejada (yellow card) 90+2'	Stadium: Toyota Field; Attendance: 3,735; Referee: Natalie Simon

May 3, 2025 8	Rhode Island FC	0–0	San Antonio FC	Pawtucket, Rhode Island
4:00 p.m. EDT	Holstad (yellow card) 44'; Kwizera (yellow card) 65'	Report	J. Hernandez (yellow card) 45'; Paredes (yellow card) 45+1'; N. Hernandez (yellow card) 77'	Stadium: Tidewater Landing Stadium; Attendance: 10,700; Referee: Alyssa Nichols

May 10, 2025 9	San Antonio FC	1–2	Oakland Roots	San Antonio, Texas
7:30 p.m. CDT	J. Hernandez 12' (yellow card) 14'; Crognale (yellow card) 21'; Taintor (yellow card) 30' (red card) 89'	Report	Alekseev (yellow card) 8'; Sinisterra 25'; Wilson 84'; McIntosh (yellow card) 90+5'	Stadium: Toyota Field; Attendance: 6,507; Referee: Nabil Bensalah

May 17, 2025 10	Charleston Battery	4–0	San Antonio FC	Mount Pleasant, South Carolina
7:30 p.m. EDT	Jennings 24' (pen.) 58'; Omar 30' (o.g.); Klein 90'	Report		Stadium: Patriots Point; Attendance: 4,465; Referee: Brad Jensen

May 28, 2025 11	San Antonio FC	1–1	FC Tulsa	San Antonio, Texas
7:00 p.m. CDT	Hernández 70' (pen.)	Report	Calheira 70' (pen.)	Stadium: Toyota Field; Attendance: 5,659; Referee: Ekaterina Koroleva

June 7, 2025 12	San Antonio FC	3–0	Las Vegas Lights FC	San Antonio, Texas
8:00 p.m. CDT	Paredes 13' (pen.); Haakenson 27'; Hernandez 61'	Report		Stadium: Toyota Field; Attendance: 5,393; Referee: Atahan Yaya

June 14, 2025 13	Sacramento Republic FC	0−0	San Antonio FC	Sacramento, California
8:00 PM		Report		Stadium: Heart Health Park; Attendance: 9,379; Referee: Brandon Stevis

June 21, 2025 14	New Mexico United	4−2	San Antonio FC	Albuquerque, New Mexico
7:00 PM	Lindsey 10'; Akale 59'; Fernando 90+1'; Vargas 90+3'	Report	Taintor 54' (pen.); Buckmaster 76'; Paredes (yellow card) 40' (yellow-red card) 88'	Stadium: Isotopes Park; Attendance: 9,801; Referee: Servando Berna Rico

July 4, 2025 15	El Paso Locomotive	1–2	San Antonio FC	El Paso, Texas
7:00 p.m. MDT	Cabrera (yellow card) 28'; Moreno 67', (yellow card) 77' (yellow-red card) 90+5'; Rui (yellow card) 77'; Alfaro (yellow card) 81'	Report	Agudelo 11', (yellow card) 15'; Medranda (yellow card) 45+4'; Soto (yellow card) 46'; Hernandez (yellow card) 57'; Buckmaster (yellow card) 80'; Taintor (yellow card) 81'; Crognale 83'; Berrón (yellow card) 86'	Stadium: Southwest University Park; Attendance: 8,432; Referee: Thomas Snyder

July 12, 2025 16	San Antonio FC	1–0	Tampa Bay Rowdies	San Antonio, Texas
8:00 p.m. CDT	Haakenson 90+5'	Report	Lasso (yellow card) 29' (yellow-red card) 67'	Stadium: Toyota Field; Attendance: 5,969; Referee: Edson Carvajal

August 2, 2025 17	San Antonio FC	1–3	Sacramento Republic FC	San Antonio, Texas
8:00 p.m. CDT	Pacheco 34'	Report	Desmond 33'; Bennett 82'; Parano 90+1'	Stadium: Toyota Field; Attendance: 5,494; Referee: Atahan Yaya

August 9, 2025 18	Las Vegas Lights FC	1–1	San Antonio FC	Las Vegas, Nevada
7:30 pm	Rodriguez 53' (yellow card) 73'; Herbert (yellow card) 67'; Gannon (yellow card) 90+1'	Report	Berrón 18' (yellow card) 24'; Neville (yellow card) 51'; Crognale (yellow card) 89'	Stadium: Cashman Field; Attendance: 2,811; Referee: Gerald Flores

August 16, 2025 19	San Antonio FC	0–1	Lexington SC	San Antonio, Texas
8:00 p.m. CDT	Hernandez (red card) 90+3'	Report	Hernandez 9' (o.g.)	Stadium: Toyota Field; Attendance: 6,767; Referee: Calin Radosav

August 20, 2025 20	Orange County SC	–	San Antonio FC	Irvine, California
		Report		Stadium: Championship Soccer Stadium
Note: Match postponed to October 15 to accommodate San Antonio FC's USL Cup Quarterfinal match.

August 23, 2025 21	Monterey Bay FC	0–0	San Antonio FC	Seaside, California
8:00 PM		Report	Berrón (yellow card) 27' (yellow-red card) 86'	Stadium: Cardinale Stadium; Attendance: 4,266; Referee: Elijio Arreguin

August 30, 2025 22	Detroit City FC	1–1	San Antonio FC	Hamtramck, Michigan
	Hernandez-Foster 66'	Report	J. Hernandez 21'	Stadium: Keyworth Stadium; Attendance: 6,233; Referee: Nabil Bensalah

September 6, 2025 23	San Antonio FC	0–1	New Mexico United	San Antonio, Texas
8:00 p.m. CDT	Walker (red card)	Report	Archimede 67'	Stadium: Toyota Field; Attendance: 6,210; Referee: Alyssa Pennington

September 13, 2025 24	Loudoun United FC	2−5	San Antonio FC	Leesburg, Virginia
5:00 p.m. EDT	Ordóñez 21'; Santos (red card); Souahy 63' (o.g.)	Report	Medranda 58'; Patino 61'; J. Hernandez 77' 90+10'; Neville 90'	Stadium: Segra Field; Attendance: 2,820; Referee: Matthew Thompson

September 20, 2025 25	San Antonio FC	3–1	Orange County SC	San Antonio, Texas
8:00 p.m. CDT	Pacheco 30'; D. Hernandez 47'; J. Hernandez 66'	Report	Benalcazar 54'	Stadium: Toyota Field; Attendance: 5,970; Referee: Joshua Encarnación

September 27, 2025 26	San Antonio FC	0–0	Birmingham Legion FC	San Antonio, Texas
8:00 p.m. CDT		Report		Stadium: Toyota Field; Attendance: 7,009; Referee: Luis Arroyo

October 4, 2025 27	Colorado Springs Switchbacks FC	1−0	San Antonio FC	Colorado Springs, Colorado
	Tejada 15'; Lacroix (red card)	Report		Stadium: Weidner Field; Attendance: 6,452; Referee: Cristian Campo Hernández

October 11, 2025 28	FC Tulsa	2–0	San Antonio FC	Tulsa, Oklahoma
	Calheira 8'; Batista 75'	Report		Stadium: ONEOK Field; Attendance: 2,289; Referee: John Griggs

October 15, 2025 20	Orange County SC	1–0	San Antonio FC	Irvine, California
	Sylla 90+2'	Report		Stadium: Championship Soccer Stadium; Attendance: 4,340; Referee: Greg Dopka
Note: Match postponed from August 20 to accommodate San Antonio FC's USL Cup Quarterfinal match.

October 18, 2025 29	Phoenix Rising FC	1–0	San Antonio FC	Phoenix, Arizona
	Dennis 11'	Report		Stadium: Phoenix Rising Soccer Stadium; Attendance: 7,563; Referee: Brad Jensen

October 25, 2025 30	San Antonio FC	5–2	El Paso Locomotive FC	San Antonio, Texas
8:00 p.m. CDT	Patino 9'; Haakenson 22'; Alfaro 35' (o.g.); D. Hernandez 53'; Taintor 86'	Report	Moreno 7'; Sorto 54'	Stadium: Toyota Field; Attendance: 8,164; Referee: Abdou Ndiaye

=== USL Championship playoffs ===
As the sixth seed in the Western Conference, San Antonio qualified for the 2025 USL Championship playoffs, scheduled away against New Mexico United. Playing in Albuquerque, San Antonio lost 2–0, concluding the club's season.

November 1, 2025 West	New Mexico United	2–0	San Antonio FC	Albuquerque, New Mexico
7:00 PM MT	Akale 20'; Noël 58'	Report		Stadium: Isotopes Park; Attendance: 8,287; Referee: Joshua Encarnación

=== USL Cup ===
==== Group 3 ====
Pos	Lg	Team	Pld	W	PKW	PKL	L	GF	GA	GD	Pts	Qualification
1	USLC	San Antonio FC	4	3	0	1	0	6	2	+4	10	Advance to knockout stage
2	USLC	New Mexico United	4	1	2	1	0	9	7	+2	8	
3	USLC	Colorado Springs Switchbacks FC	4	2	0	1	1	7	4	+3	7	
4	USLC	Phoenix Rising FC	4	1	2	0	1	10	10	0	7	
5	USLC	El Paso Locomotive FC	4	1	1	1	1	3	3	0	6	
6	USL1	Union Omaha	4	1	0	0	3	3	5	−2	3	
7	USL1	Texoma FC	4	0	0	1	3	5	12	−7	1	

Updated to match(es) played on July 26, 2025. Source: USL
Rules for classification: 1) points; 2) head-to-head points earned in group play; 3) total wins in group play; 4) goals for in group play; 5) goals against in group play; 6) disciplinary points; 7) coin toss.

==== Match results ====
April 26, 2025	Phoenix Rising FC	0–1	San Antonio FC	Phoenix, Arizona
7:00 PM MST		Report	Agudelo 63'	Stadium: Phoenix Rising Soccer Stadium; Attendance: 6,515; Referee: Elijio Arreguin

June 25, 2025	Colorado Springs Switchbacks FC	0–2	San Antonio FC	Colorado Springs, Colorado
7:00 PM MDT		Report	Paredes 63', 89'	Stadium: Weidner Field; Attendance: 5,500; Referee: Trevor Wiseman

June 28, 2025	San Antonio FC	1–0	Union Omaha	San Antonio, Texas
8:00 PM CDT	LaCava 9'	Report		Stadium: Toyota Field; Attendance: 6,183; Referee: Cristian Campo

July 26, 2025	San Antonio FC	2–2 (0–3 p)	New Mexico United	San Antonio, Texas
8:00 PM CDT	Agudelo 8', 51'	Report	Noël 90+2'; Harris 90+9'	Stadium: Toyota Field; Attendance: 6,092; Referee: Matthew Corrigan
	Penalties
	Hernández (penalty missed); Taintor (penalty missed); Neville (penalty missed)		(penalty scored) Hurst; (penalty scored) Akale; (penalty scored) Maples

==== Quarter-finals ====
August 20	San Antonio FC	0–2	Hartford Athletic	San Antonio, Texas
7:30 PM CDT		Report	Dieng 36'; Hairston 58'	Stadium: Toyota Field; Attendance: 4,789; Referee: Natalie Simon

=== Lamar Hunt U.S. Open Cup ===
April 15, 2025 Third Round	Union Omaha	1–0	San Antonio FC	Omaha, Nebraska
7:00 p.m. CDT	Acoff 36'	Report		Stadium: Caniglia Field; Referee: Drew Klemp

== Statistics ==
=== Appearances ===
Discipline includes league, playoffs, and Open Cup play.

No.	Pos.	Name	League		Playoffs		U.S. Open Cup		USL Cup		Total		Discipline	
No.	Pos.	Name	Apps	Goals	Apps	Goals	Apps	Goals	Apps	Goals	Apps	Goals	Yellow card	Red card
1	GK	(Mexico) Richard Sánchez	15	0	0	0	1	0	0	0	16	0	1	0
2	DF	(Somalia) Abdi Salim	2	0	0	0	0	0	1	0	3	0	0	0
3	DF	(United States) Mitchell Taintor	13	1	0	0	0	0	2	0	15	1	4	1
4	DF	(El Salvador) Nelson Blanco	11	0	0	0	1	0	2	0	14	0	4	0
5	DF	(Comoros) Alexis Souahy	7	0	0	0	1	0	2	0	10	0	0	0
6	MF	(Somalia) Mohamed Omar	5	1	0	0	1	0	1	0	7	1	0	0
7	MF	(United States) Luke Haakenson	17	4	0	0	0	0	2	0	19	4	0	0
8	MF	(United States) Nicky Hernandez	16	0	0	0	1	0	3	0	20	0	6	0
9	MF	(United States) Jake LaCava	13	1	0	0	0	0	1	1	14	2	1	0
10	MF	(Mexico) Jorge Hernandez	13	7	0	0	1	0	1	0	15	7	8	0
11	FW	(New Zealand) Alex Greive	10	2	0	0	1	0	1	0	12	2	1	0
13	GK	(United States) Daniel Namani	2	0	0	0	0	0	2	0	4	0	1	0
14	MF	(Argentina) Lucio Berrón	14	0	0	0	0	0	3	0	17	0	8	0
17	FW	(United States) Juan Agudelo	11	0	0	0	1	0	3	1	15	1	3	0
18	MF	(Colombia) Almir de Jesús Soto	15	0	0	0	1	0	2	0	19	0	5	0
21	DF	(United States) Alex Crognale	16	2	0	0	1	0	1	0	18	2	5	0
22	DF	(Trinidad and Tobago) Shannon Gomez	1	0	0	0	0	0	2	0	3	0	1	0
23	DF	(United States) Rece Buckmaster	13	1	0	0	0	0	1	0	14	1	1	0
32	FW	(Colombia) Luis Paredes	11	1	0	0	1	0	3	2	15	3	5	1
34	MF	(United States) Juan Osorio	6	0	0	0	0	0	1	0	7	0	2	0
41	DF	(United States) Leonardo Jauregui	0	0	0	0	0	0	1	0	1	0	0	0
42	MF	(United States) Landry Walker	1	0	0	0	0	0	1	0	2	0	0	0
45	MF	(United States) Leonides Urrutia	0	0	0	0	0	0	1	0	1	0	0	0
52	MF	(United States) Dyllan Mendoza	1	0	0	0	0	0	1	0	2	0	0	0
53	DF	(United States) Braylon Jernigan	0	0	0	0	0	0	1	0	1	0	0	0
55	MF	(Russia) Dmitri Erofeev	9	0	0	0	1	0	3	0	13	0	1	0
70	FW	(Portugal) Diogo Pacheco	10	1	0	0	1	0	1	0	12	1	2	0
77	DF	(England) Harvey Neville	1	0	0	0	0	0	0	0	1	0	0	0
94	DF	(Colombia) Jimmy Medranda	14	1	0	0	1	0	2	0	16	1	6	0
99	GK	(United States) Joseph Batrouni	0	0	0	0	0	0	1	0	1	0	0	0

Last updated: July 12, 2025.
Source: San Antonio FC

=== Top scorers ===
The list is sorted by shirt number when total goals are equal.

Rnk	Pos	No.	Player	League	Playoffs	U.S. Open Cup	USL Cup	Total
1	MF	10	(Mexico) Jorge Hernandez	11	0	0	0	11
2	MF	7	(United States) Luke Haakenson	5	0	0	0	5
3	FW	17	(United States) Juan Agudelo	1	0	0	3	4
4	FW	32	(Colombia) Luis Paredes	1	0	0	2	3
4	FW	70	(Portugal) Diogo Pacheco	3	0	0	0	3
6	FW	9	(United States) Jake LaCava	1	0	0	1	2
6	FW	11	(New Zealand) Alex Greive	2	0	0	0	2
6	DF	21	(United States) Alex Crognale	2	0	0	0	2
6	DF	94	(Colombia) Jimmy Medranda	2	0	0	0	2
6	DF	3	(United States) Mitchell Taintor	2	0	0	0	2
6	MF	8	(United States) Nicky Hernandez	2	0	0	0	2
6	FW	99	(Colombia) Santiago Patino	2	0	0	0	2
13	MF	6	(Somalia) Mohamed Omar	1	0	0	0	2
13	DF	14	(Argentina) Lucio Berrón	1	0	0	0	2
13	DF	23	(United States) Rece Buckmaster	1	0	0	0	2
13	DF	77	(England) Harvey Neville	1	0	0	0	2
TOTALS				39	0	0	6	45

Last updated: October 28, 2025.
Source: San Antonio FC

=== Clean sheets ===
The list is sorted by shirt number when total clean sheets are equal.

Rnk	No.	Player	League	Playoffs	U.S. Open Cup	USL Cup	Total
1	1	(Mexico) Richard Sánchez	6	0	0	0	6
2	13	(United States) Daniel Namani	2	0	0	2	4
3	99	(United States) Joseph Batrouni	0	0	0	1	1
TOTALS			8	0	0	3	11

Last updated: October 25, 2025.
Source: San Antonio FC

=== Summary ===
Games played	20 (16 USL Championship) (1 U.S. Open Cup) (3 USL Cup)
Games won	11 (8 USL Championship) (0 U.S. Open Cup) (3 USL Cup)
Games drawn	3 (3 USL Championship) (0 U.S. Open Cup) (0 USL Cup)
Games lost	6 (5 USL Championship) (1 U.S. Open Cup) (0 USL Cup)
Goals scored	27 (23 USL Championship) (0 U.S. Open Cup) (4 USL Cup)
Goals conceded	22 (21 USL Championship) (1 U.S. Open Cup) (0 USL Cup)
Goal difference	+5 (+2 USL Championship) (-1 U.S. Open Cup) (+4 USL Cup)
Clean sheets	9 (6 USL Championship) (0 U.S. Open Cup) (3 USL Cup)
Yellow cards	61 (47 USL Championship) (3 U.S. Open Cup) (11 USL Cup)
Red cards	2 (2 USL Championship) (0 U.S. Open Cup) (0 USL Cup)
Most appearances	(United States) Nicky Hernandez (20 appearances)
Top scorer	(Mexico) Jorge Hernandez (11 goals)
Winning Percentage	Overall: 11/20 (55.00%)

Last updated: July 12, 2025.
Source: San Antonio FC
