= List of San Antonio FC seasons =

San Antonio FC is an American soccer club that competes in the USL Championship, the second division of American soccer. Established in 2016, the club began play in USL in its final season as a tier 3 league, before moving up with USL's sanctioniong as a tier two league. The following list covers each season of the club's existence, documenting its performance in all competitive competitions.

== Key ==
Key to competitions

- USL Championship (USL/USLC) – The second division of soccer in the United States, established in 2010 and previously known as USL and USL Pro. The Championship was the third division of American soccer from its founding until its elevation to second division status in 2017.
- USL Cup - The interleague cup competition contested by the USL professional tiers, beginning in 2024 with USL League One only, and expanding the following year.
- U.S. Open Cup (USOC) – The premier knockout cup competition in US soccer, first contested in 1914.
- CONCACAF Champions Cup (CCC) – The premier competition in North American soccer since 1962.

Key to colors and symbols

1st or W	Winners
2nd or RU	Runners-up
Last	Wooden Spoon
♦	League Golden Boot

Key to league record

- Season = The year and article of the season
- Tier = Level on pyramid
- League = League name
- Conf/Div = Conference or division within the league
- Pld = Games played
- W = Games won
- D = Games drawn
- L = Games lost
- GF = Goals scored
- GA = Goals against
- Pts = Points
- Conf = Conference position
- Ovr = Overall league position

Key to cup record

- DNQ = Did not qualify
- NH = Competition not held or canceled
- R1 = First round
- R2 = Second round
- R3 = Third round
- R4 = Fourth round
- Ro32 = Round of 32
- Ro16 = Round of 16
- QF = Quarterfinals
- SF = Semifinals
- RU = Runners-up
- W = Winners

== Seasons ==
As of October 30, 2026

Year	Tier	League	Conf/Div	Record							Position		Playoffs	USOC	USL Cup	CCC	Top Scorer(s) (Note: Includes all goals scored in league, league playoffs, U.S. Open Cup, CONCACAF Champions League, FIFA Club World Cup, and other competitive continental matches.)		Average attendance	
Year	Tier	League	Conf/Div	P	W	D	L	GF	GA	Pts	Conf	Overall	Playoffs	USOC	USL Cup	CCC	Player	Goals	Reg.	Playoffs
2016	3	USL	Western	30	10	8	12	36	36	38	10th	17th	DNQ	R4	-	DNQ	(Colombia) Rafael Castillo (United States) Franck Tayou	5	6,170	N/A
2017	2	USL	Western	32	17	11	4	45	24	62	2nd	3rd	R2	R3	-	DNQ	(Turks and Caicos Islands) Billy Forbes	10	7,153	7,026
2018	2	USL	Western	34	14	8	12	45	48	50	9th	15th	DNQ	R4	-	DNQ	(Mexico) Éver Guzmán	11	6,939	N/A
2019	2	USLC	Western	34	12	9	13	62	57	45	11th	20th	DNQ	R3	-	DNQ	(England) Jack Barmby (Mexico) Éver Guzmán	9	6,765	N/A
2020	2	USLC	Group D	16	10	3	3	30	14	33	3rd	6th	R1	NH	-	DNQ	(Argentina) Luis Solignac	8	2,448 (Note: Capacity limited due to the COVID-19 pandemic in the United States.)	2,175
2021	2	USLC	Western	32	14	10	8	50	38	52	4th	10th	SF	NH	-	DNQ	(Brazil) Nathan	13	4,832	7,485
2022	2	USLC	Western	34	24	5	5	54	26	77	1st	1st	W	Ro32	-	DNQ	(United States) Samuel Adeniran	12	5,980	8,329
2023	2	USLC	Western	34	14	14	6	63	38	56	4th	7th	R2	R3	-	DNQ	(Canada) Tani Oluwaseyi	18	7,190	7,304
2024	2	USLC	Western	34	10	9	15	36	49	39	9th	20th	DNQ	Ro32	-	DNQ	(United States) Juan Agudelo	8	6,714	N/A
2025	2	USLC	Western	30	11	7	12	39	38	40	6th	12th	R1	R3	QF	DNQ	(Mexico) Jorge Hernández	11	6,366	N/A
2026	2	USLC	Western	30	11	12	7	32	30	45	6th	11th	R1	R2	SF	DNQ	(Argentina) Cristian Parano	8	6,166	N/A
