= Tiago =

Tiago may refer to:

== Places ==
- São Tiago, Minas, Brazil
- Santiago, Isabela, Philippines
- Santiago, Chile
- Santiago de Compostela, Galicia, Spain
- Santiago de Cuba, Cuba
- Santiago de los Caballeros, Dominican Republic
- Santiago (disambiguation) § Other places, many applications

== People ==
=== Given name ===
- Tiago Banega (born 1999), Argentine footballer
- Tiago Cardoso (disambiguation), many applications of Tiago Cardoso / Thiago Cardoso
- Bebé (Tiago Manuel Dias Correia, born 1990), Portuguese football player
- Tiago (footballer, born March 1983), full name Tiago de Oliveira Souza, Brazilian football right back
- Tiago (footballer, born 1984), full name Tiago dos Santos Roberto, Brazilian football forward
- Tiago Campagnaro (born 1983), Brazilian football goalkeeper
- Tiago Casasola (born 1995), Argentine footballer
- Tiago Ferreira (footballer, born 1975) (born 1975), Portuguese footballer
- Tiago Ferreyra (born 2002), Argentine footballer
- Tiago Freitas (born 2006), Portuguese footballer
- Tiago Geralnik (born 2003), Argentine footballer
- Tiago Godinho (born 1984), Portuguese tennis player
- Tiago Ilori (born 1993), Portuguese footballer
- Tiago Magalhães (born 1981), Brazilian baseball player
- Tiago Mendes (born 1981), Portuguese footballer known simply as Tiago
- Tiago Palacios (born 2001), Argentine footballer
- Tiago Tomás Palacios (born 2003), Argentine footballer
- Tiago Pinto (born 1988), Portuguese footballer
- Tiago Pires (footballer) (born 1987), Portuguese footballer
- Tiago PZK (born 2001), Argentine rapper and singer
- Tiago Henrique Gomes da Rocha (born 1988), Brazilian serial killer and robber
- Tiago Sampaio Romão (born 1999), Portuguese trampoline gymnast
- Tiago Santos (born 2002), Portuguese footballer
- Tiago Silva (footballer, born 1979) (born 1979), Brazilian footballer
- Tiago Splitter (born 1985), Brazilian professional basketball player playing in the NBA
- Tiago (wrestler) (born 1987), ring name of Arturo Santos Hernández, Mexican professional wrestler
- Santiago Suárez (born 2005), known as Tiago, American soccer player

== Surname ==
- Jacksen F. Tiago (born 1968), Brazilian footballer and manager

== Other ==
- Tiago (horse) (foaled 2004), an American racehorse
- "Tiago" (song), by French singer Kendji Girac from his 2018 album Amigo
- Tata Tiago, an Indian hatchback city car

== See also ==
- Thiago (disambiguation)
- Diego (disambiguation)
- Jacob
- Jaco (disambiguation)
