= Thiago =

Thiago is a Portuguese equivalent of the names Jacob and James. It is a spelling of the name Tiago, derived from Santiago. Presently mostly used in Brazil, and seldom in other Portuguese language countries where the Tiago spelling is more common.

- Thiago (footballer, born September 1988), Thiago de Lima, Brazilian footballer
- Thiago (footballer, born October 1988), Thiago Pinto Borges, Brazilian footballer
- Thiago de Los Reyes (born 1989), Brazilian television and film actor
- Thiago Alcântara (born 1991), Brazilian-Spanish footballer, known simply as Thiago
- Thiago Almada (born 2001), Argentine footballer
- Thiago Alves (tennis) (born 1982), Brazilian tennis player
- Thiago Alves (fighter) (born 1983), Brazilian mixed martial artist
- Thiago Soares Alves (born 1986), Brazilian volleyball player
- Thiago Auricchio (born 1993), Brazilian politician
- Thiago Ávila (born 1986), Brazilian humanitarian activist
- Thiago Bordin (born 1983), Brazilian ballet drancer
- Thiago Cionek (born 1986), Polish-Brazilian footballer
- Thiago Corrêa (born 1982), Brazilian footballer
- Thiago Fernández (born 2004), Argentine footballer
- Thiago Garrocho (born 1987), Brazilian politician
- Thiago Lugano (born 2006), Uruguayan footballer
- Thiago Luna (born 1998), Argentine footballer
- Thiago Monteiro (table tennis) (born 1981), Brazilian table tennis player
- Thiago (footballer, born February 1983), Thiago dos Santos Costa, Brazilian footballer
- Thiago (footballer, born November 1983), Thiago de Lima Silva, Brazilian footballer
- Thiago Monteiro (tennis) (born 1994), Brazilian tennis player
- Thiago Maia (born 1997), Brazilian footballer
- Thiago Medina (born 2003), Brazilian politician
- Thiago Motta (born 1982), Brazilian footballer
- Thiago Neves (born 1985), Brazilian footballer
- Thiago Nuss (born 2001), Argentine footballer
- Thiago Ojeda (born 2003), Argentine footballer
- Thiago Prieto (born 2003), Argentine futsal player
- Thiago Quirino (born 1985), Brazilian footballer
- Thiago Ribeiro (born 1986), Brazilian footballer
- Thiago Romano (born 2006), Argentine footballer
- Thiago Santos (disambiguation), various people
- Thiago Silva (born 1984), Brazilian footballer
- Thiago Surfista (born 1982), Brazilian politician
- Thiago (footballer, born 1991), Thiago Lima da Silva, Brazilian footballer
- Thiago (footballer, born 1996), Thiago Rodrigues da Silva, Brazilian footballer
- Thiago (footballer, born 1997), Thiago Rodrigues de Souza, Brazilian footballer
- Thiago (footballer, born 2001), Igor Thiago Nascimento Rodrigues, Brazilian footballer
- Thiago Silva (fighter) (born 1982), Brazilian mixed martial artist
- Thiago Seyboth Wild (born 2000), Brazilian tennis player
- Thiago Agustín Tirante (born 2001), Argentine tennis player

== See also ==
- Tiago (disambiguation)
- Diego
- Jacob
