= Abdi Salim =

Somali footballer (born 2001)

Personal information
- Full name: Abdi Muya Salim
- Date of birth: 1 April 2001 (age 25)
- Place of birth: Nairobi, Kenya
- Height: 6 ft 1 in (1.85 m)
- Position: Defender

Youth career
- 2013–2018: Delaware SC
- 2018–2019: Empire United

College career
Years	Team	Apps	(Gls)
2019	Buffalo State Bengals	18	(1)
2020–2022	Syracuse Orange	30	(1)

Senior career*
Years	Team	Apps	(Gls)
2022	Ocean City Nor'easters	7	(0)
2023–2024	Orlando City	3	(0)
2023–2024	→ Orlando City B (loan)	20	(2)
2024	→ Detroit City (loan)	3	(0)
2025	San Antonio FC	11	(0)

International career^{‡}
2023–2024	Somalia	5	(0)
- * Club domestic league appearances and goals as of 25 October 2025 ‡ National team caps and goals as of 12 October 2024

Abdi Muya Salim (born 1 April 2001) is a Somali professional footballer who plays as a defender. Salim represented the Somalia national team from 2023 to 2024, making five appearances and once captaining the team.

Salim was born in Kenya in a refugee camp, but immigrated to the United States in 2003 after his family successfully applied for asylum. In the United States, Salim joined the youth soccer outfits of Delaware SC and Empire United, before beginning college soccer in 2019 with the Buffalo State Bengals. With the Bengals, Salim was named the 2019 SUNYAC Rookie of the Year and 2019 Defender of the Year. In 2020, Salim joined Syracuse Orange, with whom he helped win the Atlantic Coast Conference regular season and tournament in 2022, and win the NCAA College Cup that same year.

Salim was selected by Orlando City as the 17th overall pick in the 2023 MLS SuperDraft, with whom he played mostly with their reserve team, Orlando City B, the following two years. While signed to Orlando City, Salim also joined Detroit City in the USL Championship on loan in 2024. At the end of 2024, Salim's contract with Orlando City expired, and he joined USL Championship club San Antonio FC the following year, first on a short-term deal, and then for the rest of the season. San Antonio FC allowed Salim's contract to expire at the end of the season.

== Early years ==
Born a refugee in Nairobi, Kenya, Salim grew up in the Dagahaley refugee camp in Dadaab. Having applied for asylum in the United States before Salim was born, his parents were granted a visa in 2003 and relocated once Salim had recovered from malaria. They settled in Buffalo, New York. Salim attended Hutchinson Central Technical High School and played his first-ever organized soccer game with youth club Delaware SC in 2013. In 2018, he was recruited for Rochester-based Empire United where he captained the US Developmental Academy under-17 and under-19 teams during a two-year spell.

=== College career ===
In 2019, Salim began playing college soccer for the Buffalo State Bengals, a Division III State University of New York Athletic Conference (SUNYAC) program at Buffalo State University where older brother Saleman had already played the 2018 season. He played one season, starting 18 games, scoring one goal and leading the Bengals in minutes played. He was named SUNYAC Rookie of the Year and SUNYAC Defensive Player of the Year.

Ahead of the 2020 season, Salim entered the transfer portal and joined Division I program Syracuse Orange of the Atlantic Coast Conference. With the season disrupted by the COVID-19 pandemic, he started the first eight games of the season before suffering an anterior cruciate ligament tear against Bowling Green Falcons on 23 February 2021 and underwent surgery, ruling him out for the remainder of the 2020–21 spring season and the subsequent 2021 fall campaign. He returned for the 2022 season, playing in 22 of a possible 25 games including every minute of all three ACC Tournament games and all five in the NCAA Tournament. Syracuse did the clean sweep of 2022 ACC regular season, 2022 ACC tournament and 2022 NCAA Division I tournament titles, the first national championship win in program history.

== Club career ==
=== Ocean City Nor'easters ===
In May 2022, during the college offseason, Salim joined USL League Two side Ocean City Nor'easters. He made seven appearances as Ocean City went undefeated and topped the Mid Atlantic Division.

=== Orlando City ===
On 21 December 2022, Salim was selected in the first round (17th overall) of the 2023 MLS SuperDraft by Orlando City. After training with the club in preseason, he was signed to a one-year contract with three additional club option years on 14 February 2023. On 4 March, Salim made his debut for the team when he started in a scoreless draw with FC Cincinnati. Later on 26 March, Salim made his debut with the reserve team, Orlando City B, and scored his first professional goal in a 3–1 road victory over Philadelphia Union II.

ON 27 February 2024, Salim made his continental debut when he came on as a 64th-minute substitute for Rafael Santos as Orlando City defeated Cavalry FC 3–1 in the 2024 CONCACAF Champions Cup. On 5 December, it was announced that Orlando City were allowing Salim's contract to expire at the end of the season and that they were not interested in pursuing an extension.

==== Loan to Detroit City ====
On 24 June 2024, Salim joined USL Championship team Detroit City on loan for the remainder of the season. He had previously made a trial appearance for the club in a friendly against Liga MX side Pumas UNAM, in which he scored the winning goal, two days earlier. On 19 November it was announced that Salim would be returning to Orlando City at the conclusion of the season.

=== San Antonio FC ===
Salim joined Major League Soccer club FC Cincinnati's preseason tour in Clearwater, Florida in January 2025, but he was not signed. On 20 June, Salim signed with USL Championship club San Antonio FC on a twenty-five day contract. A day later, Salim made his debut for the team when he came on as a 46th-minute substitute for Almir Soto in a 4–2 loss to New Mexico United. On 22 July, San Antonio FC signed Salim for the rest of the season following the expiration of the short-term contract.

== International ==
In October 2023, Salim was called up to represent the Somalia national team at senior level. He made his debut on 14 October, captaining the team in a 3–0 defeat to Niger.

== Career statistics ==
=== College ===
School	Season	Division	Apps	Goals
Buffalo State Bengals	2019	SUNYAC (Div. III)	18	1
Syracuse Orange	2020–21	ACC (Div. I)	8	1
Syracuse Orange	2021	ACC (Div. I)	0	0
Syracuse Orange	2022	ACC (Div. I)	22	0
Syracuse Orange	Total		30	1
Career total			48	2

=== Club ===
As of 25 October 2025

Club	Season	League			U.S. Open Cup		Continental		Playoffs		Other		Total	
Club	Season	Division	Apps	Goals	Apps	Goals	Apps	Goals	Apps	Goals	Apps	Goals	Apps	Goals
Ocean City Nor'easters	2022	USL League Two	7	0	—		—		0	0	—		7	0
Orlando City	2023	Major League Soccer	3	0	0	0	0	0	0	0	0	0	3	0
Orlando City	2024	Major League Soccer	0	0	—		1	0	—		—		1	0
Orlando City	Total		3	0	0	0	1	0	0	0	0	0	4	0
Orlando City B (loan)	2023	MLS Next Pro	16	2	—		—		0	0	—		16	2
Orlando City B (loan)	2024	MLS Next Pro	4	0	—		—		—		—		4	0
Orlando City B (loan)	Total		20	2	0	0	0	0	0	0	0	0	20	2
Detroit City (loan)	2024	USL Championship	3	0	0	0	—		—		—		3	0
San Antonio FC	2025	USL Championship	11	0	—		—		—		1 (Note: Appearance in USL Cup)	0	12	0
Career total			44	0	0	0	1	0	0	0	1	0	46	2

=== International ===
As of match played 10 June 2024

Appearances and goals by national team and year
National team	Year	Apps	Goals
Somalia	2023	3	0
Somalia	2024	2	0
Total		5	0

== Honours ==
Ocean City Nor'easters

- Mid Atlantic Division: 2022

Syracuse Orange

- Atlantic Coast Conference regular season: 2022
- Atlantic Coast Conference tournament: 2022
- NCAA College Cup: 2022

Individual

- SUNYAC Rookie of the Year: 2019
- SUNYAC Defensive Player of the Year: 2019
