= Joey Batrouni =

Association football player (born 2002)

Personal information
- Date of birth: September 13, 2002 (age 24)
- Place of birth: San Antonio, Texas, United States
- Height: 6 ft 3 in (1.91 m)
- Position: Goalkeeper

Team information
- Current team: San Antonio FC
- Number: 98

Youth career
- 2016–2020: SAFC Pro Academy

College career
Years	Team	Apps	(Gls)
2021–2022	Coastal Carolina Chanticleers	23	(0)
2023–2024	Virginia Cavaliers	32	(0)

Senior career*
Years	Team	Apps	(Gls)
2022	Des Moines Menace	4	(0)
2023	Des Moines Menace	1	(0)
2025–	San Antonio FC	28	(0)
- * Club domestic league appearances and goals as of October 25, 2026

Joseph Batrouni (Arabic: جوزف بتروني; (Note: Batrouni is also referred to in Arabic-language sources by the hypocorism جوي (Joey).) born September 13, 2002) is a professional soccer player who plays as a goalkeeper for San Antonio FC in the USL Championship. Born in the United States, he was called up to the Lebanon national team.

== Early life ==
Batrouni is a native of San Antonio, Texas. He began playing soccer at the age of seven, and joined the San Antonio FC Pro Academy in 2016, the club's inaugural season. He had an opportunity to train with the first team in 2019.

He attended LEE High School, helping the team win the 2021 Class 6A state championship, having finished as runner-up in 2019. He was selected as Goalkeeper of the Year and to the All-Region team four times, and was a three-time All-State selection.

== College career ==
Batrouni began his collegiate career in NCAA Division I with the Coastal Carolina Chanticleers in 2021. Across the 2021 and 2022 seasons, he made 23 appearances, including 22 starts. He was named Sun Belt Conference Defensive Player of the Week twice during the 2022 season.

In January 2023, Batrouni transferred to the Virginia Cavaliers. Across the 2023 and 2024 seasons, he made 32 appearances. He was named Atlantic Coast Conference Defensive Player of the Week once in each season and helped Virginia reach the NCAA Division I's round of 16 in 2023.

== Club career ==
=== Des Moines Menace ===
During the summers of 2022 and 2023, Batrouni played for Des Moines Menace in USL League Two. He made his league debut against Minneapolis City SC on May 8, 2022, as a 48th-minute substitute for Grant Makela who was sent off.

=== San Antonio FC ===
In January 2025, Batrouni signed a multi-year professional contract with San Antonio FC of the USL Championship, with the agreement pending league and federation approval. He joined the team in May after completing his degree at the University of Virginia. On June 28, 2025, Batrouni made his first professional start in a 1–0 victory over Union Omaha in the USL Cup, recording three saves and a clean sheet. During the 2025 season, he served as the backup to veteran goalkeeper Richard Sánchez.

Batrouni became the team's starting goalkeeper during the 2026 season. He started the season opener against Phoenix Rising FC, making two saves in a 2–1 victory. He was named to the USL Championship Team of the Week four times during the season, including on October 11, following a stoppage-time penalty save in a goalless draw against Oakland Roots SC. He played 33 games in all competitions in 2026.

== International career ==
Batrouni was first called up to the Lebanon national team by head coach Madjid Bougherra in November 2026, ahead of the 2026 Basra Tournament matches against Iraq and Palestine. However, he did not join the team citing "urgent personal reasons".

== Career statistics ==
=== Club ===
As of match played October 31, 2026

Appearances and goals by club, season and competition
Club	Season	League			Playoffs		National cup (Note: Includes U.S. Open Cup)		Other		Total	
Club	Season	Division	Apps	Goals	Apps	Goals	Apps	Goals	Apps	Goals	Apps	Goals
Des Moines Menace	2022	USL League Two	4	0	0	0	0	0	—		4	0
Des Moines Menace	2023	USL League Two	1	0	0	0	0	0	—		1	0
San Antonio FC	2025	USL Championship	0	0	0	0	0	0	2 (Note: Appearances in USL Cup)	0	2	0
San Antonio FC	2026	USL Championship	28	0	1	0	1	0	3	0	33	0
San Antonio FC	Total		28	0	1	0	1	0	5	0	35	0
Career total			33	0	1	0	1	0	5	0	40	0
