= Tiago Cardoso (disambiguation) =

Tiago Cardoso dos Santos (born 1984) is a Brazilian footballer who plays as a goalkeeper for Santa Cruz.

Tiago Cardoso or Thiago Cardoso may also refer to:

- Tiago Cardoso Mendes (born 1981), known as Tiago, Portuguese football midfielder and assistant manager
- Thiago Ribeiro Cardoso (born 1986), Brazilian football forward
- Thiago Cardoso (born 1991), Brazilian football defender
- Thiago Cardozo (born 1996), Uruguayan football goalkeeper

== See also ==
- Tiago (disambiguation)
