= Tiago (footballer, born March 1983) =

Brazilian footballer

Personal information
- Full name: Tiago Oliveira de Souza
- Date of birth: 16 March 1983 (age 43)
- Place of birth: São Paulo, Brazil
- Height: 1.74 m (5 ft 9 in)
- Position: Right back

Youth career
- –2003: São Paulo

Senior career*
Years	Team	Apps	(Gls)
2003–2007	São Paulo	10	(0)
2004	→ Paysandu (loan)		
2004	→ Paulista (loan)		
2005	→ Santa Cruz (loan)		
2005	→ Ituano (loan)		
2006	→ Fortaleza (loan)		
2006	→ Sport Recife (loan)		
2007	América-SP		
2007	Brasiliense		
2008	América-MG		
2009	Marília		
2009	Sertãozinho		
2010	Central		
2011	São Bento		
2011	Ituano		
2011	Boa Esporte		
2012	Cametá		
2013	São José-SP		
2013	Santa Cruz-PA		
2016	Real Noroeste		
- * Club domestic league appearances and goals as of 29 December 2023

Tiago Oliveira de Souza (born 16 March 1983), simply known as Tiago, is a Brazilian former professional footballer and who played as a right back.

== Career ==
Right back, Tiago played for São Paulo in the youth teams until 2003, when he began his professional career. He was loaned to several clubs, with emphasis on Santa Cruz, where he was champion of Pernambuco in 2005. He also won Module II twice in Minas Gerais, with América in 2008 and Boa Esporte in 2011. He was also part of the Pará champion squad with Cametá in 2012. Ended his career in 2016 at Real Noroeste.

== Honours ==
Santa Cruz

- Campeonato Pernambucano: 2005

América Mineiro

- Campeonato Mineiro Módulo II: 2008

Boa Esporte

- Campeonato Mineiro Módulo II: 2011

Cametá

- Campeonato Paraense: 2012
