= Almir Soto =

Colombian footballer (born 1994)

Personal information
- Full name: Almir de Jesús Soto Maldonado
- Date of birth: 17 July 1994 (age 32)
- Place of birth: Barranquilla, Colombia
- Height: 1.80 m (5 ft 11 in)
- Position: Midfielder

Senior career*
Years	Team	Apps	(Gls)
2015–2018	Santa Fe	36	(4)
2016	→ Fortaleza CEIF (loan)	15	(2)
2018–2019	→ Nueva Chicago (loan)	12	(0)
2019–2020	→ Patriotas Boyacá (loan)	14	(0)
2021	Asociación Deportivo Pasto	20	(2)
2022–2023	Żebbuġ Rangers	22	(0)
2024	Deportivo La Guaira	27	(0)
2025	San Antonio FC	30	(0)
- * Club domestic league appearances and goals as of 13:19, 31 October 2025 (UTC)

Almir de Jesús Soto Maldonado (born 17 July 1994) is a Colombian professional footballer who plays as a defensive midfielder or as a fullback.

== Career statistics ==
=== Club ===
As of 9 December 2015

Club	Season	League		Cup		Continental		Other^{1}		Total	
Club	Season	Apps	Goals	Apps	Goals	Apps	Goals	Apps	Goals	Apps	Goals
Santa Fe	2015	13	2	3	0	5	0	—		21	2
Santa Fe	2016	—								0	0
Santa Fe	Total	13	2	3	0	5	0	0	0	21	2
Total		13	2	3	0	5	0	0	0	21	2

^{1} Includes Recopa Sudamericana and Suruga Bank Championship.

== Honours ==
=== Club ===
Santa Fe

- Copa Sudamericana : 2015
