= Danny Barbir =

American soccer player (born 1998)

Personal information
- Full name: Daniel Jacob Barbir
- Date of birth: January 31, 1998 (age 28)
- Place of birth: Atlanta, Georgia, United States
- Height: 1.91 m (6 ft 3 in)
- Position: Defender

Team information
- Current team: San Antonio FC

Youth career
- Lehigh Valley United
- Players Development Academy
- 2013: Philadelphia Union
- 2014: Manchester City
- 2014–2017: West Bromwich Albion

Senior career*
| Years | Team | Apps | (Gls) |
| 2017 | Whitecaps FC 2 | 3 | (0) |
| 2018–2019 | Astra Giurgiu | 0 | (0) |
| 2019 | → Sandhausen II (loan) | 11 | (0) |
| 2020–2021 | Sporting Kansas City II | 39 | (4) |
| 2022–2023 | Oakland Roots | 61 | (2) |
| 2024 | Indy Eleven | 3 | (0) |
| 2024 | Miami FC | 19 | (0) |
| 2025 | Lexington SC | 9 | (0) |
| 2026– | San Antonio FC | 16 | (1) |

International career
| 2013 | United States U15 | 2 | (0) |
| 2014–2015 | United States U17 | 5 | (0) |
| 2016–2017 | United States U19 | 2 | (0) |
- * Club domestic league appearances and goals as of November 10, 2026

Daniel Jacob Barbir (born January 31, 1998) is an American professional soccer player who plays as a defender for San Antonio FC in the USL Championship.

== Early life ==
Barbir was born in Atlanta, Georgia, to a Cuban mother and Romanian father. He grew up in Macungie, Pennsylvania, and visited his relatives in Romania on several occasions.

== Club career ==
=== Early years ===
Barbir signed his first professional contract with English club West Bromwich Albion in 2015, aged 17.

In early 2017, he joined Stoke City on trial, playing three matches and scoring one goal for their under-23 team.

Barbir joined United Soccer League side Whitecaps FC 2 on September 14, 2017. He only made three appearances, as WFC2 were dissolved two months later.

=== Astra Giurgiu ===
On February 19, 2018, Barbir agreed to a three-and-a-half-year deal with Astra Giurgiu in Romania.

=== Sporting Kansas City II ===
Barbir signed with USL Championship side Sporting Kansas City II on January 27, 2020. Barbir scored his first professional goal in his fourth appearance for the club on August 1, 2020, which ended up being the matchwinner in the 70th minute as Sporting Kansas City II defeated the Indy Eleven 1–0 at Lucas Oil Stadium. Following the 2021 season, Kansas City opted to declined their contract option on Barbir.

=== Oakland Roots ===
On January 18, 2022, Barbir signed with USL Championship club Oakland Roots.

=== Indy Eleven ===
On November 20, 2023, it was announced Barbir would join USL Championship club Indy Eleven ahead of their 2024 season. Barbir made his debut for the Indianapolis-based club in a 2–1 victory over Memphis 901 FC on March 16, 2024.

=== Miami FC ===
On April 11, 2024, Barbir was transferred to USL Championship club Miami FC in a swap deal.

=== Lexington SC ===
Barbir joined USL Championship expansion side Lexington SC on December 26, 2024, ahead of the 2025 season. He made his debut for the team on March 8, 2025, in a 2–0 league home victory over Hartford Athletic.

=== San Antonio FC ===
On February 3 2026, San Antonio FC announced they had signed Barbir for the 2026 season.

== International career ==
Barbir represented the United States at under-17 and under-19 level, and played with the former side at the 2015 FIFA U-17 World Cup in Chile where he was teammates with Christian Pulisic. As a junior, he had also been approached by Romania.

== Career statistics ==
=== Club ===
As of February 19, 2018.

Appearances and goals by club, season and competition
| Club | Season | League | | | Domestic Cup | | League Cup | | Continental | | Other | | Total | |
| Club | Season | Division | Apps | Goals | Apps | Goals | Apps | Goals | Apps | Goals | Apps | Goals | Apps | Goals |
|---|---|---|---|---|---|---|---|---|---|---|---|---|---|---|
| West Bromwich Albion U23 | 2016–17 | — | | | — | | — | | — | | 1 (Note: Appearances in the EFL Trophy) | 0 | 1 | 0 |
| Whitecaps FC 2 | 2017 | United Soccer League | 3 | 0 | 0 | 0 | — | | — | | — | | 3 | 0 |
| Astra Giurgiu | 2017–18 | Liga I | 0 | 0 | 0 | 0 | — | | — | | — | | 0 | 0 |
| Career total | | | 3 | 0 | 0 | 0 | 0 | 0 | — | — | 1 | 0 | 4 | 0 |

== Honors ==
United States U17

- CONCACAF Under-17 Championship third place: 2015
