= Thiago Santos (disambiguation) =

Thiago Santos (born 1984) is a Brazilian mixed martial artist.

Thiago Santos may also refer to the following people:

- Thiago Santos (fighter, born 1986), Brazilian mixed martial artist
- Thiago Santos (footballer, born 1984), Brazilian football second striker
- Thiago Santos (footballer, born 1987), Brazilian football forward for Nea Salamina
- Thiago Santos (footballer, born 1989), Brazilian football defensive midfielder for Grêmio
- Thiago Santos (footballer, born 1990), Brazilian footballer for Brasil de Pelotas
- Thiago Santos (footballer, born 1992), Brazilian football midfielder for Bankhai United
- Thiago Santos (footballer, born 1995), Brazilian football attacking midfielder for NEROCA

== See also ==
- Tiago Santos (born 2002), Portuguese football right-back for Estoril
