= Thiago Auricchio =

Brazilian politician (born 1993)

- Auricchio in 2019

Member of the Legislative Assembly of São Paulo
- Incumbent
- Assumed office 15 March 2019

Personal details
- Born: 23 April 1993 (age 33)
- Party: Liberal Party (since 2018)
- Parent: José Auricchio Júnior (father)

Thiago Reis Auricchio (born 23 April 1993) is a Brazilian politician serving as a member of the Legislative Assembly of São Paulo since 2019. He has served as chairman of the Constitution and Justice Committee since 2023. He is the son of José Auricchio Júnior.
