= Tiago (song) =

2018 song by Kendji Girac

Single by Kendji Girac

from the album Amigo
- Released: 19 October 2018
- Recorded: 2018
- Genre: Pop
- Length: 2:58
- Songwriters: Kendji Girac; Vianney
- Producers: Renaud Rebillaud; Vianney

Kendji Girac singles chronology
"Pour oublier" (2018)	"Tiago" (2018)	"Que Dieu me pardonne" (2018)

Music video
- "Tiago" on YouTube

"Tiago" is a song by Kendji Girac. It was released as the third single from his album Amigo.

== Charts ==
Chart (2018–2019)	Peak position
Belgium (Ultratip Bubbling Under Flanders)	34
Belgium (Ultratop 50 Wallonia)	5
France (SNEP)	12
