= Nicky Hernandez =

American soccer player (born 1998)

Personal information
- Full name: Dominick Gilbert Hernandez
- Date of birth: September 21, 1998 (age 28)
- Place of birth: Dallas, Texas, United States
- Height: 5 ft 10 in (1.79 m)
- Position: Midfielder

Team information
- Current team: San Antonio FC
- Number: 8

Youth career
- –2017: Dallas Texans

College career
Years	Team	Apps	(Gls)
2017–2019	SMU Mustangs	48	(8)

Senior career*
Years	Team	Apps	(Gls)
2018	Texas United	9	(2)
2019	Denton Diablos	8	(4)
2020	FC Harrington		
2020–2021	North Texas SC	32	(6)
2021–2022	FC Dallas	0	(0)
2022	→ San Antonio FC (loan)	23	(2)
2023–2024	New Mexico United	47	(5)
2025–	San Antonio FC	42	(3)
- * Club domestic league appearances and goals as of October 31, 2026

Dominick "Nicky" Gilbert Hernandez (born September 21, 1998) is an American professional soccer player who currently plays for San Antonio FC in the USL Championship.

== Playing career ==
=== Youth, college and amateur ===
Hernandez was part of the USSDA academy side Dallas Texans until 2017, when he went to play college soccer at Southern Methodist University. Hernandez played three seasons with the Mustangs between 2017 and 2019, making 48 appearances, scoring 8 goals and tallying 9 assists. Hernandez was named AAC All-Tournament Team in 2019 and All-SMU Tournament Team in 2018.

While at college, Hernandez played with USL PDL side Texas United during their 2018 season, scoring 2 goals and tallying 3 assists in 9 regular season appearances. During his 2019 season, Hernandez played with NPSL side Denton Diablos FC.

Hernandez played in the United Premier Soccer League for FC Harrington during the Spring 2020 season.

=== North Texas SC ===
On September 12, 2020, Hernandez left college early to sign a professional contract with North Texas SC, the USL League One affiliate of MLS side FC Dallas. He made his debut the same day, starting in a 2–0 win over FC Tucson.

On January 21, 2021, FC Dallas selected Hernandez 15th overall in the 2021 MLS SuperDraft.

=== FC Dallas ===
On March 23, 2021, Hernandez officially signed for MLS side FC Dallas. Following the 2022 season, his contract option was declined by Dallas.

=== New Mexico United ===
On July 25, 2023, Hernandez signed a deal with USL Championship side New Mexico United for the remainder of their 2023 season.

=== San Antonio FC ===
Hernandez returned to San Antonio FC on a permanent contract on December 20, 2024.
