= Spurs Sports & Entertainment =

American sports and entertainment corporation

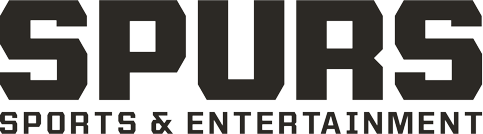
- Type: Private
- Industry: Professional sports, property management
- Founded: 1967
- Headquarters: San Antonio, Texas, USA
- Area served: San Antonio, Texas; Austin, Texas
- Key people: Peter J. Holt (Managing Partner); R. C. Buford (CEO); Brian Wright (General Manager); Gregg Popovich (President of Spurs Basketball)
- Products: professional sports teams, sports venues
- Subsidiaries: San Antonio Spurs; Austin Spurs; San Antonio FC

Spurs Sports & Entertainment L.L.C. (SS&E) is an American sports and entertainment organization based in San Antonio, Texas. The company owns and operates several sporting franchises including the National Basketball Association (NBA) San Antonio Spurs, NBA G League Austin Spurs, and the USL Championship club San Antonio FC. SS&E also operates the Bexar County-owned multi-purpose facility, the Frost Bank Center.

A 2013 Forbes article called the San Antonio Spurs "North America's best run professional sports franchise," and ESPN named the Spurs as the best sports franchise in all major sports in 2014.

== Properties ==
=== San Antonio Spurs ===
The San Antonio Spurs are an American professional basketball team based in San Antonio, Texas. They are part of the Southwest Division of the Western Conference in the National Basketball Association (NBA). They were NBA champions in 1999, 2003, 2005, 2007, and 2014.

The Spurs are one of four former American Basketball Association teams to remain intact in the NBA after the 1976 ABA–NBA merger. The Spurs' five NBA championships are the fifth most in history, behind only the Boston Celtics (18), Los Angeles Lakers (17), Golden State Warriors (7), and Chicago Bulls (6). The Spurs currently rank first among active franchises for the highest winning percentage in NBA history.

In their 45 NBA seasons since 1976–1977, the Spurs have won 22 division titles. They tied an NBA record by making the playoffs 21 consecutive years, from 1997-1998 to 2018–2019, and have missed the playoffs seven times since entering the NBA. They have missed the playoffs in three consecutive seasons. The Spurs also hold the record for most consecutive 50-win seasons at 18, spanning from 1999–2000 to 2016–2017.

==== Frost Bank Center ====
The Frost Bank Center is a multi-purpose indoor arena on the east side of San Antonio, Texas. It seats 18,581 for basketball, 16,000 for ice hockey, and up to 19,000 for concerts or religious gatherings, and contains 2,018 club seats, 60 luxury suites and 32 bathrooms.

The arena was completed in 2002, as the SBC Center. While Bexar County owns the arena, SS&E is partnered with the county to manage the day-to-day operations of the Frost Bank Center.

The Frost Bank Center went under a renovation of more than $100 million, with improvements that include expanded entrances, renovated concourses, new concessions and bar areas, a larger Fan Shop and a new HD video scoreboard. Renovations were completed before the 2015–16 season.

=== San Antonio FC ===
San Antonio FC are an American professional soccer team based in San Antonio, Texas. Founded in 2016, the team debuted in the United Soccer League that same year. It was announced as the league's thirty-first franchise on January 7, 2016. SS&E also operate Toyota Field.

=== Austin Spurs ===
The Austin Spurs are an American basketball team of the NBA G League based in Austin, Texas.

The team plays its home games at Cedar Park Center. They have made the postseason 7 out of their 12 seasons in the NBA Development League/G League, winning the D League/G League Championship in twice in the 2012 and 2018 seasons. The team is currently coached by Ken McDonald.

Former Austin Spurs in the NBA include Danny Green, Cory Joseph, Gerald Green and Alonzo Gee.

== Other investments ==
=== Tribe Gaming ===
On July 27, 2021, Spurs Sports & Entertainment invested into Austin, Texas-based mobile gaming esports organization Tribe Gaming.

== Partners ==
Spurs Sports & Entertainment listed the following partners as of October 2014:

- ARAMARK Sports & Entertainment Group
- Raymond Joseph Barshick
- Cassandra Carr
- Clear Channel Communications Inc.
- George C. "Tim" Hixon
- Peter Holt - Chairman
- IBC Capital Corporation
- Sylvan Stephen Lang
- James R. Leininger
- R&B Partnership (Russell and Bruce Hill)
- David Robinson
- AT&T Media Holdings, Inc.
- Markey Family Partnership
- Sierra Sports & Entertainment Family Limited Partnership
- SWBC
- Sunrise Sports & Entertainment
- Valero Energy Corporation
- Zachry Hospitality Corporation
- Estate of Jeanne Lang Mathews
- LAZ parking

The nonprofit partner of SS&E is Silver & Black Give Back, a 501(c)(3) that sponsors two key initiatives, Team Up Challenge, a service-based learning program, and youth sports programs such as the Spurs Youth League.

== Former properties ==
=== San Antonio Stars ===
The San Antonio Stars played in the Western Conference in the Women's National Basketball Association (WNBA). The team was founded in Salt Lake City, Utah as the Utah Starzz before the league's inaugural 1997 season began; the team moved to San Antonio before the 2003 season after they purchased the team from Larry H. Miller (currently Miller Sports + Entertainment).

The Stars qualified for the WNBA Playoffs in seven of their twelve years in San Antonio. The franchise while in San Antonio was home to many high-quality players such as all-star point guard Becky Hammon, solid power forward Sophia Young, two #1 overall draft picks in Ann Wauters and Kelsey Plum, and seven-foot-two-inch center Margo Dydek. In 2008, the Silver Stars went to the WNBA Finals.

On August 5, 2014, Hammon was hired by the Spurs as an assistant coach, becoming the second female assistant coach in NBA history but the first full-time assistant coach. This also made her the first full-time female assistant coach in any of the four major professional sports in North America.

In October 2017, multiple media reports indicated that SS&E was nearing completion of the sale of the Stars to a group that would move the team to Las Vegas for the 2018 season and beyond. The team was sold to MGM Resorts International and moved to Las Vegas prior to the 2018 WNBA season, and is now known as the Las Vegas Aces.

=== San Antonio Rampage ===
The San Antonio Rampage were an ice hockey team in the American Hockey League. While in operation they were the top affiliate of the Florida Panthers, Arizona Coyotes, Colorado Avalanche, and St. Louis Blues of the NHL. The Rampage played in the AT&T Center in San Antonio, the same arena as the Spurs, from the 2002–03 season until the 2019–20 season.

On February 6, 2020, the Vegas Golden Knights announced it had purchased the franchise from the Spurs with the intent to relocate it to the Las Vegas area. The purchase and relocation was approved by the league on February 28.
