= Mitchell Taintor =

American soccer player (born 1994)

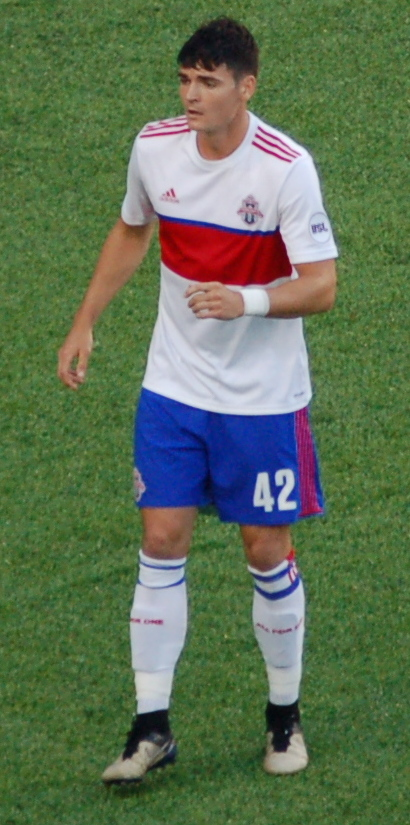
- Taintor playing for Toronto FC II in 2016

Personal information
- Full name: Mitchell Taintor
- Date of birth: September 11, 1994 (age 32)
- Place of birth: Willimantic, Connecticut, United States
- Height: 1.85 m (6 ft 1 in)
- Position: Defender

Team information
- Current team: San Antonio FC
- Number: 3

Youth career
- New England Revolution

College career
Years	Team	Apps	(Gls)
2012–2015	Rutgers Scarlet Knights		

Senior career*
Years	Team	Apps	(Gls)
2013	Ocean City Nor'easters	2	(0)
2014–2015	Real Boston Rams	24	(0)
2016–2017	Toronto FC II	47	(3)
2018–2019	Sacramento Republic	55	(3)
2018	→ Toronto FC (loan)	1	(1)
2020	San Antonio FC	15	(1)
2021	Sacramento Republic	10	(1)
2021	→ San Antonio FC (loan)	13	(0)
2022–	San Antonio FC	136	(10)
- * Club domestic league appearances and goals as of October 31, 2026

Mitchell Taintor (born September 11, 1994) is an American professional soccer player who currently plays as a defender for San Antonio FC in the USL Championship.

== Career ==
=== Youth ===
Prior to his collegiate career, Taintor represented New England Revolution's youth set-up. Totalling 58 appearances for the Under-16s and a further 24 appearances for the Under-18s, he featured in the MLS Reserve Division while being named to the Adidas Interregional All-Star Select in 2008 and the Region I team in 2009.

=== College ===
Taintor attended Rutgers University for four years, where he played for the Scarlet Knights. Scoring 13 times in 71 appearances, while also recording eight assists, he was named to the NSCAA Second Team All-Midwest Region, Second Team All-Big Ten Conference and Big Ten Conference All-Tournament Team.

During his time in college, Taintor played for the Ocean City Nor'easters of the Premier Development League in 2013 before spending 24 games for Premier Development League side Real Boston Rams during 2014 and 2015. His final year with the Scarlet Knights was spent in the same league.

=== Professional ===
Taintor was drafted in the third round, 59th overall, in the 2016 MLS SuperDraft by Toronto FC on January 19, 2016. After spending four games of pre-season with the first team, he made five appearances in Toronto FC II's pre-season campaign. On March 15 it was announced that he had signed with the affiliate team ahead of their USL season. He made his debut on March 26, in a 2–2 draw with New York Red Bulls II.

Taintor signed with Sacramento Republic for the 2018 season in January 2018. He was loaned to Toronto FC for one game in April, as Toronto's roster was shorthanded due to the majority of the team being in Mexico for a Concacaf Champions League match. He scored a goal in that appearance for Toronto against the Houston Dynamo, which made him the 100th player to score a goal for the club.

In February 2020, Taintor joined San Antonio FC.

On December 16, 2020, Taintor returned to Sacramento Republic ahead of their 2021 season.

On August 25, 2021, Taintor was loaned back to San Antonio FC for the remainder of the 2021 season. He re-joined the club on a permanent basis on January 4, 2022.

== Honors ==
Individual

- USL Championship All League First Team: 2022
- USL Championship Defender of the Year: 2022

== Personal life ==
Taintor was born in Willimantic, Connecticut, to Rob and Missy Taintor. He was raised in Storrs, Connecticut, alongside siblings Amy and Jared. His mother Melissa (Morrone) Taintor played soccer at the University of Connecticut, making All-New England three times and All - American in her senior year. She was inducted into the Connecticut Soccer Hall of Fame in 2020. Taintor's uncles Joe (Jr.) and Bill Morrone won the NCAA National Soccer Championship with Connecticut in 1981, with Bill also inducted into the Connecticut Soccer Hall of Fame in 2009. His grandfather, Joseph Morrone, was the first Connecticut head soccer coach. Taintor graduated from Rutgers University with an undergraduate degree in Labor & Employment Relations.
