= Alexis Souahy =

French-Comorian footballer (born 1995)

Personal information
- Date of birth: 13 January 1995 (age 31)
- Place of birth: Montreuil, Seine-Saint-Denis, France
- Height: 1.85 m (6 ft 1 in)
- Position: Defender

Team information
- Current team: San Antonio FC
- Number: 5

Youth career
- 2008–2014: Le Havre

College career
Years	Team	Apps	(Gls)
2014	Notre Dame Falcons	18	(2)
2015–2017	Bowling Green Falcons	55	(6)

Senior career*
Years	Team	Apps	(Gls)
2012–2014	Le Havre B	1	(0)
2016–2017	Michigan Bucks	26	(3)
2018–2021	Louisville City	82	(5)
2022	New Mexico United	24	(1)
2023	Union Omaha	32	(1)
2024	Spokane Velocity	0	(0)
2024	FC Tulsa	31	(4)
2025–	San Antonio FC	23	(0)

International career^{‡}
2021	Comoros	1	(0)
- * Club domestic league appearances and goals as of 13:04, 11 November 2026 (UTC) ‡ National team caps and goals as of 00:47, 3 January 2022 (UTC)

Alexis Souahy (born 13 January 1995) is a professional footballer who plays as a defender for San Antonio FC in the USL Championship. Born in France, he has played for the Comoros national team.

== Early life ==
Souahy was born in Montreuil, Seine-Saint-Denis, France to Yolaine Souahy. He is of Comorian descent. When he was thirteen, he moved to Le Havre to join Le Havre AC's academy and attended senior high school at Lycée Saint-Joseph. While at Le Havre AC's academy, he made an appearance for their B team in 2013, helping the academy team to fourth-place finishes in both the U-19 National Championship and the Championnat de France Amateur 2.

== College and youth career ==
Souahy was originally accepted to play college soccer at Bowling Green State University only to be ruled ineligible for Division I soccer by the NCAA when his international credits did not transfer. Instead he played one year of soccer at Division II Notre Dame College in South Euclid, Ohio. In his one year at Notre Dame he started all 17 of the team's regular season matches and played 1,584 minutes out of an available 1,592. He scored two goals during the season. The first on 13 September 2014, against Wheeling Jesuit University and the second on 20 September against West Virginia Wesleyan. He also played all 90 minutes of Notre Dame's lone NCAA tournament match.

After a year at Notre Dame Souahy transferred to Bowling Green State University and played three more years of college soccer from 2015 to 2017. His first goal as a falcon came on 3 November 2015, against Appalachian State University and was the only goal of his sophomore season. As a junior he contributed two more goals and an assist and was named a MAC top 20 player by Top Drawer Soccer. His senior season he was named a team captain and scored three goals with two assists including a goal in the final home match of the season. After the season he was named to the All MAC second team, All Great-Lakes region third team, and All-Ohio first team. During his three years in Bowling Green Souahy made 55 appearances for the Falcons, scoring six goals and tallying five assists. He started every match and played all available minutes save 29 seconds.

While at college, Souahy played with USL PDL side Michigan Bucks in both their 2016 and 2017 seasons. During the 2016 season he appeared in twelve of Michigan's fourteen regular season matches scoring two goals as Michigan won the PDL's Central Conference Great Lakes Division championship. In the PDL Playoffs Souahy played in two of Michigan's four matches as Michigan won the PDL Championship. During the 2017 season he appeared in all fourteen of Michigan's regular season matches as Michigan repeated as PDL Central Conference Great Lakes Division champions scoring one goal. He also played in Michigan's lone PDL Playoffs match. During the 2017 Souahy appeared in two of Michigan's U.S. Open Cup matches including defeating professional side Indy Eleven of the NASL.

== Club career ==
On 15 January 2018, Souahy signed his first professional contract with United Soccer League side Louisville City FC. After a preseason injury he would make his professional debut on 22 April against Atlanta United 2. Starting the match in place of an injured Pat McMahon. He appeared in 19 of Louisville's 34 league matches including 11 of Louisville last 17 as he slowly became a starter as the season progressed. He scored his first professional goal on 9 September against Pittsburgh and scored three goals during league competition. He also made his first appearance in the U.S. Open Cup as a professional when he was brought on as a substitute against the Long Island Rough Riders. He went on to appear in two of Louisville's five U.S. Open Cup matches without scoring as Louisville reached the quarter-finals of the competition for the first time in its history. Souahy also appeared in all four of Louisville's USL Cup playoff matches as he and Louisville went on to win the USL Cup Final against Phoenix.

Following the 2021 season, Louisville opted to decline their contract option on Souahy.

Souahy signed a contract for the 2022 season with USL Championship side New Mexico United on 28 December 2021.

On 14 February 2023, Souahy signed with USL League One side Union Omaha.

Souahy was acquired by USL League One expansion club Spokane Velocity ahead of their inaugural season, but was immediately transferred to USL Championship team FC Tulsa. Souahy and Tulsa mutually parted ways in January 2025.

== Honours ==
Louisville City

- USL Cup: 2018
