= Christian Sorto =

Salvadoran footballer (born 2000)

Personal information
- Full name: Christian Sorto
- Date of birth: January 19, 2000 (age 26)
- Place of birth: Silver Spring, Maryland, United States
- Height: 1.80 m (5 ft 11 in)
- Positions: Midfielder; forward

Team information
- Current team: San Antonio FC
- Number: 99

Youth career
- 2015–2018: Baltimore Armour
- 2018–2019: D.C. United

Senior career*
Years	Team	Apps	(Gls)
2019–2020	Loudoun United	18	(2)
2021	Rio Grande Valley	30	(4)
2022–2023	Miami FC	59	(7)
2024	Orange County SC	24	(1)
2025	Loudoun United	5	(0)
2025	El Paso Locomotive	13	(3)
2026–	San Antonio FC	24	(3)

International career^{‡}
2017–	El Salvador	3	(0)
- * Club domestic league appearances and goals as of 10 November 2026 ‡ National team caps and goals as of 18 November 2021

Christian Sorto (born January 19, 2000) is a professional football player who plays for San Antonio FC in the USL Championship. Born in the United States, he plays for the El Salvador national team.

== Career ==
On June 26, 2019, Sorto joined D.C. United's USL Championship side Loudoun United.

On March 19, 2021, Sorto joined Rio Grande Valley FC ahead of the 2021 season. He left the team following the end of the season.

Sorto signed with USL Championship side Miami FC on December 28, 2021.

Sorto joined Orange County SC on January 10, 2024.

=== International ===
Born in the United States, Sorto is of Salvadoran descent. He represented the El Salvador national team in a friendly 2–0 loss to Guatemala on 24 September 2021. On January 24, 2021, Sorto was called up by the El Salvador national under-23 football team to participate in their camp ahead of the U23 Olympics qualifiers.
