= Santiago Suárez =

American soccer player (born 2005)

Tiago
Personal information
- Full name: Santiago Francisco Suárez
- Date of birth: April 23, 2005 (age 21)
- Place of birth: Rocklin, California, U.S.
- Height: 1.96 m (6 ft 5 in)
- Position: Defender

Team information
- Current team: San Antonio FC (on loan from New England Revolution)
- Number: 43

Youth career
- 2021–2022: Sacramento Republic

Senior career*
| Years | Team | Apps | (Gls) |
| 2022 | Sacramento Republic | 6 | (0) |
| 2023–2024 | New England Revolution II | 47 | (1) |
| 2024– | New England Revolution | 0 | (0) |
| 2025 | → Birmingham Legion (loan) | 19 | (0) |
| 2026– | → San Antonio FC (loan) | 24 | (0) |
- * Club domestic league appearances and goals as of November 10, 2026

Santiago Francisco Suárez, known as Tiago, (born April 23, 2005) is an American professional soccer player who plays as a defender for San Antonio FC on loan from New England Revolution.

== Career ==
=== New England Revolution ===
In November 2022, Suárez signed a homegrown contract with the Revolution. He made his professional debut with New England's MLS Next Pro affiliate on 26 March 2023 against Atlanta United 2. He plays both center-back and right-back.

After one season with Revolution II, he was contractually promoted to the first team.

In January 2026, he was loaned to San Antonio FC of the USL Championship league.

== Career statistics ==
=== Club ===
As of match played October 14, 2023

Appearances and goals by club, season and competition
| Club | Season | League | | | National cup | | Other | | Total | |
| Club | Season | Division | Apps | Goals | Apps | Goals | Apps | Goals | Apps | Goals |
|---|---|---|---|---|---|---|---|---|---|---|
| New England Revolution II | 2023 | MLS Next Pro | 28 | 0 | — | — | — | — | 28 | 0 |
| Sacramento Republic FC | 2022 | USL Championship | 6 | 0 | — | — | — | — | 6 | 0 |
| Career total | | | 34 | 0 | — | — | — | — | 34 | 0 |

== Personal life ==
Born in the United States, Suárez also has Uruguayan heritage. He enjoys collecting soccer cards.
