= San Antonio FC =

American professional soccer club based in San Antonio

- Full name: San Antonio Fútbol Club
- Short name: SAFC
- Founded: January 7, 2016; 10 years ago
- Stadium: Toyota Field
- Capacity: 8,296
- Owner: Spurs Sports & Entertainment
- Chairman: Peter J. Holt
- Head coach: Carlos Llamosa
- League: USL Championship
- 2025: 6th of Western Conference; Playoffs: eliminated on quarterfinals
- Website: sanantoniofc.com
Home colors	Away colors

San Antonio FC is a professional soccer club based in San Antonio, Texas. It competes in the USL Championship, the second-highest level of the United States soccer league system, as a member of the Western Conference.

== History ==
San Antonio FC was awarded the thirty-first USL franchise on January 7, 2016. The establishment of the club, along with the concurrent purchase of Toyota Field by the City of San Antonio and Bexar County, was part of a plan by local officials to obtain an expansion franchise in Major League Soccer. As a result, the San Antonio Scorpions franchise of the North American Soccer League was shut down. The first head coach in club history was former Elon University men's soccer coach and Orlando City SC Pro Academy Director, Darren Powell. Carlos Alvarez was the club's first player signing on February 2, 2016.

After failing to make the playoffs in its inaugural season, San Antonio FC finished the 2017 USL regular season with a 17–11–4 (W-D-L) record, finishing second in the USL Western Conference standings and earning their first playoff berth in club history. SAFC advanced to the Western Conference semifinals before being eliminated. San Antonio failed to make the playoffs in consecutive years in 2018 and 2019 by a combined 4 points in the conference table.

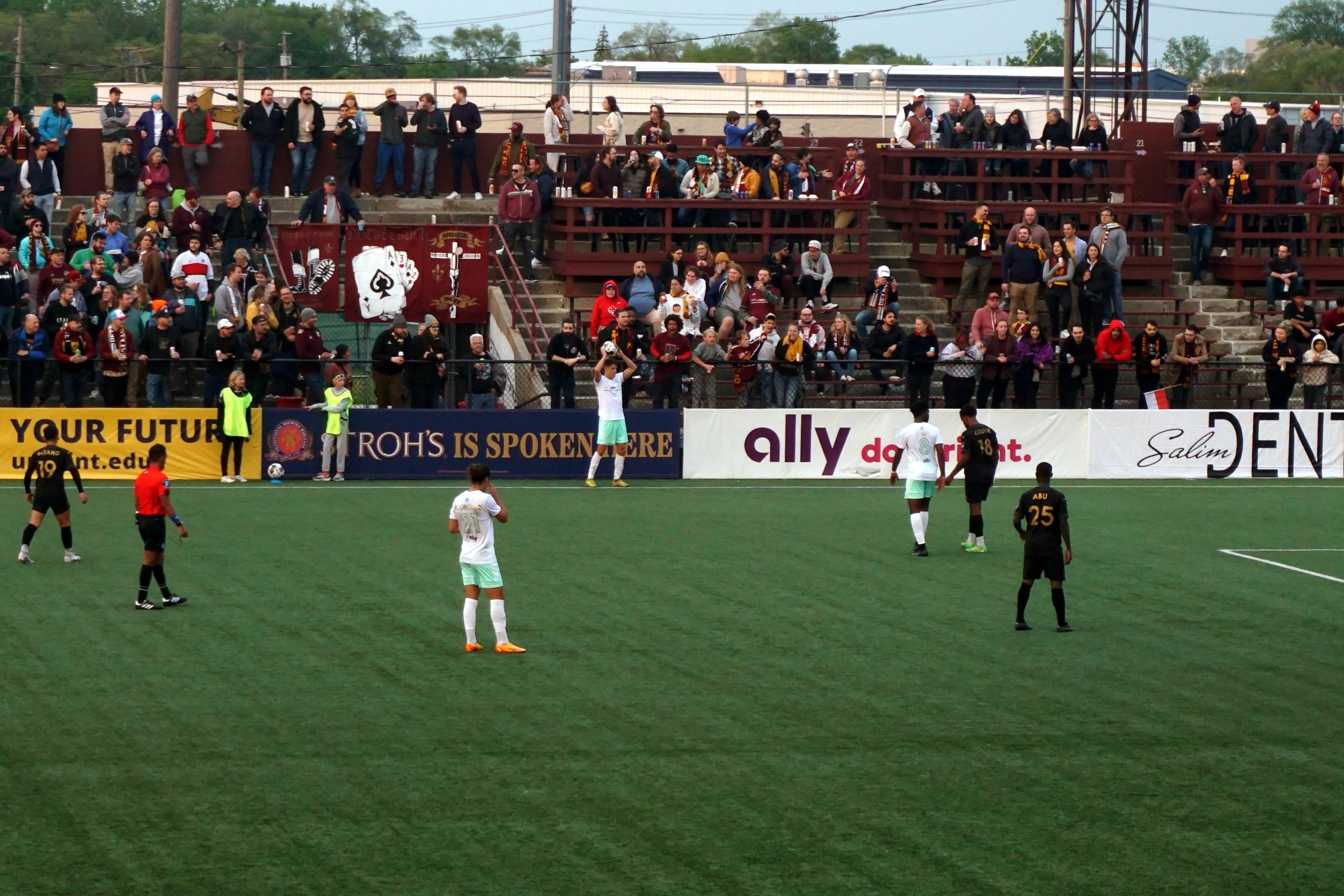
San Antonio FC playing at Detroit City FC

San Antonio FC parted ways with head coach Darren Powell on October 30, 2019, after four seasons with the club. He accumulated an overall competition win-draw-loss record of 59–39–44. He led the club to its only playoff appearance in 2017, but failed to make the playoffs in the other three seasons under his management. His assistant coach, Alen Marcina, was named to replace Powell on December 9, 2019, in preparation for the 2020 USL Championship season. He led the former San Antonio Scorpions to their only NASL championship in the 2014 season. On October 20, 2021, Marcina led the club to their second consecutive post-season berth – the first back-to-back playoff appearance in club history. San Antonio would advance to the Western Conference finals for the first time in club history, losing to eventual league champions Orange County SC in penalty kicks.

Marcina led the club back into the playoffs for a third consecutive time, part of the most successful season in club history. San Antonio captured five trophies in 2022; the Copa Tejas, Copa Tejas Shield, USLC regular season title, the Western Conference championship, and the USL Championship having beaten Louisville City FC 3–1 in the 2022 USL Championship Final. Marcina mutually parted ways with the club on October 31, 2024. In his five years with the club, Marcina had led the team to an 81-42-42 record.

== Stadium ==
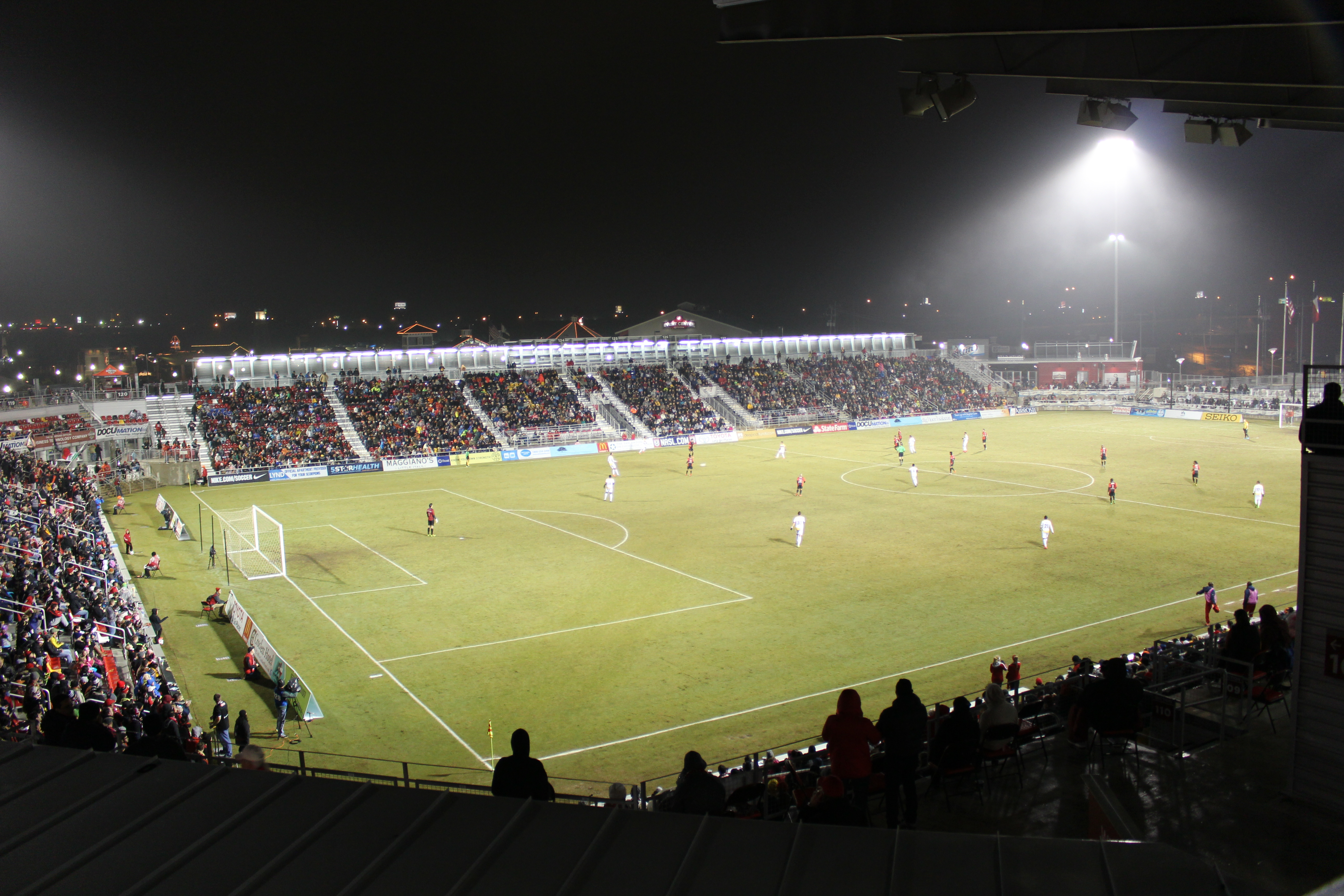
Toyota Field during Soccer Bowl 2014

- Toyota Field (2016–present), capacity 8,296

San Antonio plays its home matches at Toyota Field in San Antonio, Texas. Toyota Field is an 8,296-seat soccer-specific, natural grass stadium designed to be expandable to over 18,000 seats. Originally built for the former San Antonio Scorpions, the stadium was sold by its owner, Gordon Hartman, to the City of San Antonio and Bexar County in November 2015. San Antonio FC set a Toyota Field attendance record of 8,534 for the 2022 USL Championship Final, a 3–1 victory against Louisville City FC on November 13, 2022.

== Crest and colors ==
San Antonio's club colors are black and silver, showing strength and unity with the other SS&E franchises. Red is an accent color that is from the same red in the Texas state flag signifying the pride the club has in Texas.

The shape of San Antonio FC's badge was derived from a variety of traditional national and international club crests. The heart of the badge contains two prominent elements: the five diagonal stripes, which were inspired by the armed forces' service stripes, are a salute to San Antonio's rich military history and their upward movement signifies the club's goal to play at the highest level; and the rowel of the Spur symbolizes the direct link between San Antonio FC and its parent company, Spurs Sports & Entertainment. Binding all of the interior elements is a single "S"—a subtle nod to the hometown heritage and how it unites the community.

=== Sponsorship ===
Season	Kit manufacturer	Shirt sponsor	Ref.
2016–2021	Nike	Toyota	
2022–2023	Puma	Toyota	
2024	Puma	Community First Health Plans	
2025–present	Charly	Community First Health Plans	

== Culture ==
=== Partnerships ===
San Antonio was designated as the USL affiliate of New York City FC for the 2017 season. As of 2019, there is no reported affiliation between San Antonio FC and New York City FC.

On July 23, 2024, in accordance with the renewal of the sister city agreement between the cities of San Antonio and Darmstadt, Germany originally created in 2017, the leading soccer clubs in both cities, San Antonio FC and SV Darmstadt 98, entered into a "comprehensive partnership designed to elevate the clubs both on and off the pitch".

=== Supporter Groups ===
- The Crocketteers are the largest organized independent soccer supporters group based in San Antonio. The group was founded in March 2009 by Michael Macias.
- Mission City Firm is an independent football organization whose mission is to give 100% of their support to San Antonio FC. They are a very diverse group of individuals and "welcome any and all persons who share the same passion for the game and for what professional football here in San Antonio will do for our community."
- FTC de San Antonio
- 210 Alliance is a nonprofit organization based in San Antonio. "We are one of the supporters groups for San Antonio FC. While supporting our local club is our primary function, and supporting soccer across the city of San Antonio, as well as the United States National Teams is secondary, we also look to support our local communities as well."

== Rivalries ==
=== Copa Tejas ===
San Antonio FC shares an in-state rivalry with USL Championship side – El Paso Locomotive FC, and formerly with Rio Grande Valley FC and Austin Bold FC. Begun in the 2019 USL Championship season, all three teams participate in the Copa Tejas – a head-to-head competition during the USL regular season schedule. The team with the most points at the end of the season wins the trophy. San Antonio won its first Copa Tejas in 2022, going 3-1-0 against their opponents while also capturing the Copa Tejas Shield.

=== South Texas Derby ===
Since 2016, the annual rivalry with Rio Grande Valley FC, who served as a hybrid affiliate of the Houston Dynamo of Major League Soccer from 2016 until 2020, was one of the most hotly contested matches in lower division US soccer. The two teams were located about 237 miles apart from each other in South Texas. Due to this proximity, the matches tended to draw well and often featured aggressive play for bragging rights. The derby ended on December 18, 2023, when RGV FC officially ceased soccer and business operations.

== Ownership ==
The club is owned by Spurs Sports & Entertainment.

== Players and staff ==
=== Current roster ===
As of April 30, 2026

Note: Flags indicate national team as defined under FIFA eligibility rules; some limited exceptions apply. Players may hold more than one non-FIFA nationality.

No.	Pos.	Nation	Player
1	GK	MEX	Richard Sánchez
3	DF	USA	Mitchell Taintor
4	DF	ESA	Nelson Blanco
5	DF	COM	Alexis Souahy
6	MF	USA	Curt Calov
7	MF	USA	Luke Haakenson
8	MF	USA	Nicky Hernandez
9	FW	COL	Santiago Patiño
10	MF	MEX	Jorge Hernández
11	FW	NZL	Alex Greive
13	DF	USA	Akeem Ward
14	MF	ARG	Lucio Berrón

No.	Pos.	Nation	Player
15	MF	USA	Mikey Maldonado
17	DF	USA	Danny Barbir
19	FW	ARG	Cristian Parano
21	DF	USA	Alex Crognale
22	DF	ARG	Emil Cuello
23	DF	USA	Rece Buckmaster
43	DF	USA	Tiago Suárez (on loan from New England Revolution)
55	MF	RUS	Dmitriy Erofeev
70	FW	POR	Diogo Pacheco
77	FW	FRA	Lilian Ricol
98	GK	LBN	Joey Batrouni
99	FW	ESA	Christian Sorto

For recent transfers, see 2026 San Antonio FC season.

=== Team management ===
Executive
Chairman	(United States) Peter J. Holt
CEO	(United States) R. C. Buford
Sporting Director	(United States) Marco Ferruzzi
Staff
Head Coach	(United States) Carlos Llamosa
Assistant coach	(United States) Victor Lonchuk
Assistant coach	(Croatia) Dario Pot
SAFC Pro Academy Director & Director of Goalkeeping	(Mexico) Juan Lamadrid
Equipment Manager	(United States) Rashad Moore
Head athletic trainer	(United States) Jesse Lowrance
Assistant Athletic Trainer	(United States) Alex Saldana

Last updated: April 4, 2022

== Year-by-year ==
This is a partial list of the last five seasons completed by San Antonio. For the full season-by-season history, see List of San Antonio FC seasons.

As of October 30, 2026

Year	Tier	League	Conf/Div	Record							Position		Playoffs	USOC	USL Cup	CCC	Top Scorer(s) (Note: Includes all goals scored in league, league playoffs, U.S. Open Cup, CONCACAF Champions League, FIFA Club World Cup, and other competitive continental matches.)		Average attendance	
Year	Tier	League	Conf/Div	P	W	D	L	GF	GA	Pts	Conf	Overall	Playoffs	USOC	USL Cup	CCC	Player	Goals	Reg.	Playoffs
2022	2	USLC	Western	34	24	5	5	54	26	77	1st	1st	W	Ro32	-	DNQ	(United States) Samuel Adeniran	12	5,980	8,329
2023	2	USLC	Western	34	14	14	6	63	38	56	4th	7th	R2	R3	-	DNQ	(Canada) Tani Oluwaseyi	18	7,190	7,304
2024	2	USLC	Western	34	10	9	15	36	49	39	9th	20th	DNQ	Ro32	-	DNQ	(United States) Juan Agudelo	8	6,714	N/A
2025	2	USLC	Western	30	11	7	12	39	38	40	6th	12th	R1	R3	QF	DNQ	(Mexico) Jorge Hernández	11	6,366	N/A
2026	2	USLC	Western	30	11	12	7	32	30	45	6th	11th	R1	R2	SF	DNQ	(Argentina) Cristian Parano	8	6,166	N/A

=== Head coaches ===
San Antonio FC Coaching Stats
Coach	Nationality	Start	End	Games	Win	Draw	Loss	Win %	Trophies
Darren Powell	England	January 7, 2016	October 30, 2019	143	59	40	44	41.26	None
Alen Marcina	Canada	December 9, 2019	October 31, 2024	165	81	42	42	49.09	Copa Tejas (2x); Copa Tejas Shield (2x); USLC Players' Shield; USLC Western Conference; USLC Final
Carlos Llamosa	United States	December 16, 2024	Present	42	18	8	16	42.86	None

- Includes league regular season, league playoffs, and U.S. Open Cup matches. Excludes friendlies.

=== Club captains ===
San Antonio FC Club Captains
Dates	Player	Nationality
2016	Josh Ford	United States
2017	Michael Reed	United States
2018	Ryan Roushandel	United States
2019	Pecka	Brazil
2020	Hunter Gorskie; Luis Solignac; Joshua Yaro	United States; Argentina; Ghana
2021–2022	PC	Brazil
2023–	Mitchell Taintor	United States

=== Honors ===
San Antonio FC honors
Type	Competition	Titles	Seasons
Domestic	USL Championship	1	2022
Domestic	USLC Players' Shield	1	2022
Domestic	Western Conference Playoffs	1	2022
Domestic	Western Conference Regular Season	1	2022
Domestic	Copa Tejas Shield	2	2022, 2023
Domestic	Copa Tejas Division 2	3	2022, 2023, 2025

== Notes ==
Preceded by Orange County SC	USL Championship winner 2022	Succeeded by Phoenix Rising FC
