= Diogo Pacheco =

Portuguese footballer (born 1998)

Personal information
- Full name: Diogo Manuel das Neves de Oliveira Pacheco
- Date of birth: 13 September 1998 (age 28)
- Place of birth: Lisbon, Portugal
- Height: 1.80 m (5 ft 11 in)
- Position: Winger

Team information
- Current team: San Antonio FC
- Number: 70

Youth career
- 2006–2009: Odivelas
- 2009–2014: Benfica
- 2014–2017: Belenenses

College career
Years	Team	Apps	(Gls)
2018–2021	Akron Zips	52	(17)

Senior career*
Years	Team	Apps	(Gls)
2017	Loures	6	(0)
2018	Alverca	7	(0)
2022–2023	Minnesota United 2	47	(11)
2024	FC Tulsa	27	(4)
2025–	San Antonio FC	34	(3)
- * Club domestic league appearances and goals as of 16:51, 11 November 2026 (UTC)

Diogo Manuel das Neves de Oliveira Pacheco (born 13 September 1998) is a Portuguese professional footballer who plays as a winger for San Antonio FC in the USL Championship.

== Career ==
=== Early career and college ===
Pacheco began his career with Odivelas, before moving to be part of the famous Benfica academy until he was 15 years old. He later signed with Belenenses and helped the team win the under-19 National Championship during the 2016–17 season. He left Belenenses at 18 and signed subsequently had spells with third tier sides Loures and Alverca, before receiving an opportunity to move to the United States to play college soccer at the University of Akron. He played four years with the Zips, making 52 appearances, scoring 17 goals and tallying eleven assists. Pacheco earned accolades such as Third Team All-American selection by United Soccer Coaches, First Team Scholar All-American honoree by United Soccer Coaches, First-Team All-MAC, Academic All-MAC, First-Team All-Ohio honoree, and First-Team Academic All-Ohio.

Pacheco was considered a potential high draft pick in the 2022 MLS SuperDraft, but ended up going undrafted.

== Career in the United States ==
Pacheco signed with MLS Next Pro side Minnesota United 2 in March 2022 ahead of their inaugural season. He played two seasons with Minnesota's reserve team and made 47 regular season appearances, scoring eleven goals and adding ten assists. On 21 December 2023, it was announced that Pacheco would join USL Championship side FC Tulsa ahead of their 2024 season. He scored two goals on his first full start for the club on 8 June 2024 against San Antonio FC. He was subsequently named to the USL Championship team of the week. He left Tulsa following their 2024 season.

Pacheco signed with San Antonio FC in February 2025.
