= Jorge Hernandez (soccer, born 2000) =

Mexican footballer (born 2000)

Jorge Hernández
Personal information
- Date of birth: 8 November 2000 (age 26)
- Place of birth: Sahuayo, Michoacán, Mexico
- Position: Midfielder

Team information
- Current team: San Antonio
- Number: 10

Youth career
- –2017: LA Galaxy

Senior career*
Years	Team	Apps	(Gls)
2017–2021	LA Galaxy II	88	(18)
2022	Chornomorets	0	(0)
2022–2023	KV Mechelen	10	(0)
2023–	San Antonio FC	117	(21)
- * Club domestic league appearances and goals as of October 31, 2026

Jorge Hernández (born 8 November 2000) is a Mexican professional footballer who plays as a midfielder for USL Championship club San Antonio FC.

== Club career ==
Hernandez made his professional debut in a 1–1 draw with Orange County SC. He played 82 minutes before being replaced by Zico Bailey.

Hernandez also played for Belgian Pro League club Mechelen.

On 19 September 2019, Hernandez signed a professional contract with LA Galaxy II.

== Personal life ==
At the age of 5 Hernandez moved to the United States and grew up in Riverside, California.

== Honours ==
Individual

- USL Championship All League First Team: 2021
