= List of foreign USL Championship players =

This is a list of foreign players in the USL Championship (formally USL Pro or the United Soccer League), which commenced play in 2011. The following players must meet both of the following two criteria:

1. Have played at least one USL regular season game. Players who were signed by USL clubs, but only played in playoff games, U.S. Open Cup games, or did not play in any competitive games at all, are not included.
2. Are considered foreign, i.e., outside Canada or the United States determined by the following:

A player is considered foreign if he is not eligible to play for the national team of Canada or the United States.

More specifically,

- If a player has been capped on international level, the national team is used; if he has been capped by more than one country, the highest level (or the most recent) team is used. These include American and Canadian players with dual citizenship.
- If a player has not been capped on international level, his country of birth is used, except those who were born abroad from American or Canadian parents, or moved to Canada or the United States at a young age, and those who clearly indicated to have switched his nationality to another nation.

In bold: players who have played at least one USL game in the current season (2024 USL Championship season), and are still at the clubs for which they have played. This does not include current players of a USL club who have not played a USL game in the current season.

== UEFA ==
=== Albania ===
- Albi Skendi – Orange County SC – 2022
- Afrim Taku – Tampa Bay Rowdies, Charlotte Independence – 2018–19
- Vangjel Zguro – FC Tulsa – 2020

=== Andorra ===
- Joan Cervós – Colorado Springs Switchbacks – 2020

=== Armenia ===
- Artur Aghasyan – Los Angeles Blues – 2011
- Darón Iskenderian – Las Vegas Lights – 2022
- Gevorg Karapetyan – Orange County Blues – 2016
- Michael Soboff – Wilmington Hammerheads – 2016

=== Austria ===
- **Kelvin Arase** – **Phoenix Rising** – 2025–
- Mettin Copier – Dayton Dutch Lions – 2011–12
- Daniel Fischer – Saint Louis FC – 2020
- Christian Fuchs – Charlotte Independence – 2021
- Bernhard Luxbacher – North Carolina FC – 2018
- Remi Prieur – Sporting Kansas City II – 2020
- Richard Windbichler – San Antonio FC – 2024

=== Azerbaijan ===
- Rufat Dadashov – Phoenix Rising – 2020–21

=== Belgium ===
- Jonathan Benteke – Loudoun United – 2022
- Nico Corti – Rio Grande Valley FC Toros – 2018–19
- Dylan Damraoui – Portland Timbers 2 – 2016–17
- Xian Emmers – Phoenix Rising – 2025
- Roland Lamah – Memphis 901 – 2021
- Roy Meeus – Orange County Blues – 2016–17
- Mickael Oliveira – Wilmington Hammerheads – 2013–14
- Daouda Peeters – Las Vegas Lights – 2025

=== Bosnia and Herzegovina ===
- Emir Alihodžić – Seattle Sounders FC 2, Saint Louis FC, Fresno FC – 2016–17, 2019
- Dženan Ćatić – Harrisburg City Islanders, RGV FC Toros – 2015–16
- Robert Kristo – North Carolina FC – 2019–20
- Nedeljko Malić – Indy Eleven – 2021
- Ismar Tandir – Sacramento Republic – 2014

=== Bulgaria ===
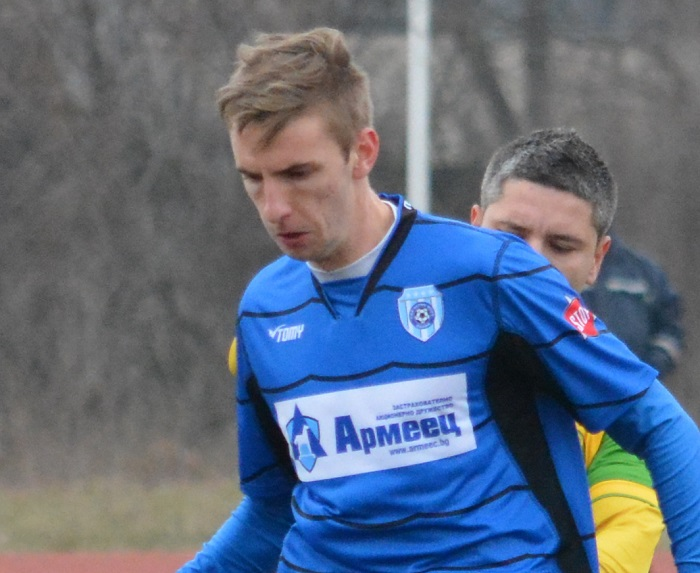
Villyan Bijev

- Villyan Bijev – Portland Timbers 2, Sacramento Republic FC, Oklahoma City Energy – 2016–21
- Georgi Hristov – Tampa Bay Rowdies – 2017–18

=== Croatia ===
- Petar Čuić – Sporting Kansas City II, FC Tulsa – 2020–22
- Matej Deković – Tulsa Roughnecks – 2017
- Aljaž Džankić – Sporting Kansas City II – 2021
- Romeo Filipović – Orange County Blues, Arizona United – 2015
- Edi Horvat – Birmingham Legion – 2022
- Nikola Katic – Pittsburgh Riverhounds – 2011–13
- Roberto Punčec – Sporting Kansas City II – 2021
- Dominik Rešetar – Sporting Kansas City II – 2020–21

=== Cyprus ===
- **Christos Chatzipaschalis** – **Hartford Athletic** – 2026–
- Tom Williams – Arizona United – 2016

=== Czech Republic ===
- **Jassem Koleilat** – **Birmingham Legion** – 2026–

=== Denmark ===
- Patrick Bunk-Andersen – Pittsburgh Riverhounds – 2020
- Michael Byskov – Oklahoma City Energy – 2015–16
- Sebastian Dalgaard – Oklahoma City Energy, Saint Louis FC, Hartford Athletic, Tampa Bay Rowdies – 2015–17, 2019–23
- Adda Djeziri – Oklahoma City Energy – 2014
- Frederik Due – Hartford Athletic, Orange County SC – 2019–20
- Thomas Enevoldsen – Orange County SC, Indy Eleven, Sacramento Republic – 2018–21
- Elias Gärtig – Las Vegas Lights – 2024–26
- Niko Hansen – San Antonio FC – 2023
- Mads Jørgensen – Hartford Athletic – 2019–20
- Mathias Jørgensen – New York Red Bulls II – 2019, 2021
- Thomas Juel-Nielsen – Orange County SC – 2018
- Danni König – Oklahoma City Energy, FC Cincinnati – 2015–18
- Philip Lund – Oklahoma City Energy – 2014
- Nikolaj Lyngø – Hartford Athletic – 2019
- Emil Nielsen – Orange County SC – 2023
- Patrick Nielsen – Atlanta United 2 – 2020
- Daniel Pedersen – Orange County SC – 2022–23
- Magnus Rasmussen – Louisville City – 2015–16, 2018–19
- Philip Rasmussen – Oklahoma City Energy, Hartford Athletic – 2017—19
- Anton Søjberg – Monterey Bay FC – 2025
- Rasmus Thellufsen – Louisville City – 2023
- Martin Vingaard – Tampa Bay Rowdies – 2017–18

=== England ===
- Noah Abrams – Loudoun United – 2021
- Charlie Adams – Louisville City, Real Monarchs, Orange County SC, San Diego Loyal, Las Vegas Lights, Colorado Springs Switchbacks – 2015–25
- Mo Adams – Tulsa Roughnecks, Atlanta United 2 – 2018–19
- Matthew Aldred – Antigua Barracuda – 2012
- Ben Algar – FC New York – 2011
- **Chris Allan** – Atlanta United 2, Memphis 901, **Charleston Battery** – 2021–
- **Conrad Ambursley** – **Phoenix Rising** – 2026–
- Tomi Ameobi – FC Cincinnati – 2018
- Sadik Balarabe – Birmingham Legion – 2022
- Jonathan Barden – Ottawa Fury, Saint Louis FC – 2017–18
- Jack Barmby – Portland Timbers 2, San Antonio FC, Phoenix Rising – 2016–20
- Matthew Barnes-Homer – Wilmington Hammerheads – 2016
- Casey Bartlett-Scott – Pittsburgh Riverhounds – 2021
- James Baxendale – Orange County SC – 2017
- Jose Baxter – Memphis 901 – 2020
- Laurie Bell – Tulsa Roughnecks – 2015
- **Faysal Bettache** – FC Tulsa, **Oakland Roots** – 2024–
- Adam Black – Tulsa Roughnecks – 2015
- **Tyler Blackett** – **New Mexico United** – 2026–
- Tyler Blackwood – Arizona United, Sacramento Republic, Swope Park Rangers, Saint Louis FC, Oakland Roots – 2016–21
- Luke Boden – Orlando City, Orlando City B, Tampa Bay Rowdies – 2011–14, 2016–17
- Conor Branson – Pittsburgh Riverhounds – 2016
- **Tom Brewitt** – Tacoma Defiance, Hartford Athletic, **Orange County SC** – 2021–22, 2025–
- Mark Briggs – Wilmington Hammerheads – 2012–13
- Harry Brockbank – El Paso Locomotive – 2022
- Max Broughton – Pittsburgh Riverhounds – 2025
- Alex Bruce – San Antonio FC – 2018
- Daniel Bruce – New Mexico United – 2019–25
- Richard Bryan – Saint Louis – 2020
- Ricky Burke – Richmond Kickers – 2015
- Antonee Burke-Gilroy – Tacoma Defiance – 2018–20
- Jake Cawsey – Colorado Springs Switchbacks – 2016–17
- Richard Chaplow – Orange County SC – 2016–18
- Callum Chapman-Page – FC Tulsa, Miami FC, Indy Eleven – 2020–24
- Paul Clowes – Richmond Kickers, Charlotte Independence, Orlando City B – 2016–17
- Carlton Cole – Sacramento Republic – 2016
- Joe Cole – Tampa Bay Rowdies – 2017–18
- Joe Connor – Charlotte Eagles – 2011
- Deri Corfe – New York Red Bulls II – 2020
- **Paco Craig** – Louisville City, Miami FC, North Carolina FC, **Indy Eleven** – 2016–19, 2021–
- Sam Craven – FC New York – 2011
- Michael Cunningham – FC Tulsa – 2021
- Mitchell Curry – Hartford Athletic – 2022
- Alex Davey – Hartford Athletic, Tampa Bay Rowdies – 2019–20
- Danny Deakin – Orlando City B – 2017
- Matthew Delicâte – Richmond Kickers – 2011–16
- **Charlie Dennis** – Oakland Roots, Tampa Bay Rowdies, Phoenix Rising, **New Mexico United** – 2022–
- Josh Dolling – New Mexico United, Las Vegas Lights – 2023
- Liam Doyle – Harrisburg City Islanders, Swope Park Rangers, Nashville SC, Memphis 901, San Antonio FC, Indy Eleven, LA Galaxy II – 2016–22
- Otis Earle – Arizona United – 2015
- **Ryan Edwards** – **Sporting Club Jacksonville** – 2026–
- Mandela Egbo – New York Red Bulls II – 2020–21
- **Jacob Evans** – **Sporting Club Jacksonville** – 2026–
- Johnny Fenwick – San Antonio FC, Las Vegas Lights, FC Tulsa, Sacramento Republic – 2019–23
- Wesley Fonguck – Monterey Bay FC – 2025
- Jermaine Fordah – El Paso Locomotive, Loudoun United – 2019, 2021
- Mark Forrest – Pittsburgh Riverhounds – 2019–20
- Harry Forrester – Orange County SC – 2019–20
- Andrew Fox – El Paso Locomotive, Orange County SC – 2019–24
- **Callum Frogson** – **Brooklyn FC** – 2026–
- Ricky Gabriel – Antigua Barracuda – 2012
- Jordan Gibbons – Phoenix Rising – 2017
- **Sam Gleadle** – Reno 1868, San Antonio FC, Monterey Bay FC, **Louisville City** – 2019–
- **Eliot Goldthorp** – Lexington SC, FC Tulsa, **Pittsburgh Riverhounds** – 2025–
- Elliot Green – Whitecaps FC 2 – 2016
- **Jack Gurr** – Atlanta United 2, **Sacramento Republic** – 2020–
- Harri Hawkins – Penn FC, Loudoun United – 2018–19
- William Heaney – Wilmington Hammerheads – 2013–15
- Harrison Heath – Orlando City, Orlando City B, Sacramento Republic, Miami FC – 2014, 2016–17, 2020
- Colin Heffron – New York Red Bulls II – 2015
- **Lewis Hilton** – Charlotte Independence, Saint Louis FC, **Tampa Bay Rowdies** – 2016–
- Seb Hines – Orlando City B – 2017
- Joe Holland – Rio Grande Valley FC Toros, Pittsburgh Riverhounds, Birmingham Legion – 2017–19
- Luke Holmes – Wilmington Hammerheads – 2012
- Mark Howard – Oklahoma City Energy – 2014
- Tyreke Johnson – Hartford Athletic – 2020
- Aaron Jones – Bethlehem Steel – 2017
- Matt Jones – Bethlehem Steel – 2016
- Ryan Jones – Richmond Kickers – 2011, 2013
- Macauley King – Indy Eleven, El Paso Locomotive, Colorado Springs Switchbacks – 2019–24
- Wilson Kneeshaw – Sacramento Republic – 2016–18
- Cameron Lancaster – Louisville City, Nashville SC, Lexington SC – 2015–23, 2025
- Nicky Law – Indy Eleven, Tampa Bay Rowdies – 2021–22
- Luke Magill – Dayton Dutch Lions – 2011–12
- Moses Makinde – Tulsa Roughnecks, El Paso Locomotive – 2019–20
- Jamie McGuinness – VSI Tampa Bay, Colorado Springs Switchbacks – 2013, 2015
- Tom Mellor – Harrisburg City Islanders – 2012–13
- Aiden Mesias – Hartford Athletic – 2019–20
- **Nathan Messer** – Rhode Island FC, **Charleston Battery** – 2024, 2026–
- Jack Metcalf – Charlotte Independence, Atlanta United 2, San Diego Loyal – 2015–16, 2018–22
- Tamika Mkandawire – Tampa Bay Rowdies – 2017–18
- James Moore – Charlotte Eagles – 2013
- Taylor Morgan – Tulsa Roughnecks, San Antonio FC – 2016
- **Ben Morris** – **Detroit City** – 2023–
- **Marqes Muir** – **Lexington SC** – 2026–
- Luke Mulholland – Wilmington Hammerheads, Real Monarchs – 2011, 2016–20
- Lewis Neal – Orlando City, Orlando City B – 2011, 2016–17
- Paul Nicholson – Wilmington Hammerheads, FC Cincinnati – 2011–17
- Onua Obasi – Rochester Rhinos, Ottawa Fury – 2014–15, 2017–19
- Kal Okot – Oklahoma City Energy – 2019
- Arron Patrick – Wilmington Hammerheads – 2013
- **Rafferty Pedder** – **Sporting Club Jacksonville** – 2026–
- Kieran Phillips – Sacramento Republic – 2024
- Nick Radosavljevic – Saint Louis FC – 2017
- Peter Ramage – Phoenix Rising – 2016–17
- Louis Ramsay – Rio Grande Valley FC Toros – 2021
- Danny Reynolds – Tacoma Defiance – 2020
- Caleb Richards – Tampa Bay Rowdies – 2019
- Jordan Rideout – Arizona United, Oklahoma City Energy – 2015–16
- Jamil Roberts – Sporting Kansas City II – 2021
- Jordan Roberts – Saint Louis FC, Reno 1868 – 2015–17
- Finbarr Robins – Antigua Barracuda – 2012
- **Arthur Rogers** – Hartford Athletic, FC Tulsa, **Miami FC** – 2020–21, 2024–
- John Rooney – Orlando City – 2012
- Luke Rooney – Phoenix Rising – 2016–18
- Callum Ross – Charlotte Independence, Oklahoma City Energy – 2017–19
- **Jordan Rossiter** – **Sporting Club Jacksonville** – 2026–
- Darrelle Russell – Antigua Barracuda – 2012
- Anthony Sanderson – Antigua Barracuda – 2012
- David Schofield – Harrisburg City Islanders – 2011
- Oliver Shannon – Atlanta United 2 – 2018
- Jamie Scope – Wilmington Hammerheads – 2011
- **Samuel Shashoua** – **Birmingham Legion** – 2025–
- Paul Shaw – FC New York – 2011
- **Tola Showunmi** – Pittsburgh Riverhounds, **Louisville City** – 2023–24, 2026–
- Kimarni Smith – Loudoun United, San Antonio FC – 2021–23
- Emmanuel Sonupe – El Paso Locomotive – 2022–23
- Chris Spendlove – Wilmington Hammerheads – 2011
- Connor Stanley – Atlanta United 2 – 2021
- Kazaiah Sterling – Pittsburgh Riverhounds – 2024
- Jordan Stewart – Phoenix Rising – 2017
- Sam Stockley – FC New York – 2011
- Joe Tait – Dayton Dutch Lions – 2011
- Tom Taylor – Wilmington Hammerheads – 2011
- Steven Taylor – Portland Timbers 2 – 2016
- **Curtis Thorn** – **Miami FC** – 2023–
- Alex Touche – New Mexico United – 2021
- Daniel Trickett-Smith – Sacramento Republic – 2016–17
- Liam Trotter – Orange County SC – 2019
- **Mason Tunbridge** – **Miami FC** – 2026–
- Shaun Utterson – Wilmington Hammerheads – 2013
- Rob Vincent – Pittsburgh Riverhounds – 2013–16
- Charlie Ward – RVG FC Toros, San Antonio FC, Ottawa Fury, Oklahoma City Energy – 2016–21
- Matt Watson – Phoenix Rising, Indy Eleven – 2017–20
- **Hayden White** – **Indy Eleven** – 2024–
- Harry Williams – Sacramento Republic – 2016–17
- **Kian Williams** – Indy Eleven, **Detroit City** – 2026–
- **Ryan Williams** – Ottawa Fury, Hartford Athletic, **Detroit City** – 2017, 2019, 2024–
- Henry Wise – New York Red Bulls II – 2022
- Laurence Wootton – Indy Eleven – 2024
- Ollie Wright – San Antonio FC, Rio Grande Valley FC Toros – 2021–22
- Shaun Wright-Phillips – New York Red Bulls II, Phoenix Rising – 2016–17
- Finnlay Wyatt – Richmond Kickers – 2017–18
- Paul Wyatt – Oklahoma City Energy – 2014
- **Laurence Wyke** – Atlanta United 2, **Tampa Bay Rowdies**, Phoenix Rising – 2019, 2021–
- Dru Yearwood – New York Red Bulls II – 2021

=== Estonia ===
- Erik Sorga – Loudoun United – 2021

=== Faroe Islands ===
- Petur Knudsen – El Paso Locomotive – 2023

=== Finland ===
- **Niko Hämäläinen** – **New Mexico United** – 2026–
- **Emil Jääskeläinen** – **Sporting Club Jacksonville** – 2026–
- Mikko Kuningas – Orange County SC – 2021–22
- Eero Markkanen – Orange County SC – 2021
- Petteri Pennanen – Sacramento Republic – 2021
- Verneri Välimaa – Orange County Blues, Colorado Springs Switchbacks – 2016, 2018

=== France ===
- Joris Ahlinvi – New Mexico United – 2020
- André Auras – LA Galaxy II – 2014–15
- Vincent Bezecourt – New York Red Bulls II, Miami FC – 2016–20
- Jason Bli – LA Galaxy II – 2014–15
- Alexy Bosetti – Oklahoma City Energy, El Paso Locomotive – 2019–20
- Rayane Boukemia – Rochester Rhinos – 2017
- **Rémi Cabral** – LA Galaxy II, Phoenix Rising, **FC Tulsa** – 2021–22, 2024–
- Hassoun Camara – FC Montreal – 2015
- Thomas Camier – Oakland Roots – 2024
- Nicolas Caraux – Atlanta United 2 – 2018
- Pierre Cayet – Pittsburgh Riverhounds – 2024
- **Abdoulaye Cissoko** – Tacoma Defiance, Memphis 901, **FC Tulsa** – 2019–21, 2024–
- Killian Colombie – Swope Park Rangers – 2019
- Laurent Courtois – LA Galaxy II – 2014
- Thomas de Villardi – Austin Bold, Charlotte Independence – 2019–21
- Mathieu Deplagne – San Antonio FC – 2021
- Bradley Diallo – LA Galaxy II – 2014–17
- Rayan Djedje – Sacramento Republic – 2025
- **Sofiane Djeffal** – Orange County SC, San Antonio FC, Lexington SC, **New Mexico United** – 2024–
- Issiar Dramé – New York Red Bulls II – 2021
- Félicien Dumas – Indy Eleven – 2020
- Yann Ekra – Harrisburg City Islanders, Charlotte Independence, Tampa Bay Rowdies – 2012–23
- **Hugo Fauroux** – Austin Bold, Charleston Battery, Loudoun United, **Louisville City** – 2021–
- Fabien Garcia – Austin Bold, San Antonio FC, Las Vegas Lights – 2019–24
- Gael Gibert – Lexington SC – 2025
- Antoine Hoppenot – Harrisburg City Islanders, FC Cincinnati, Reno 1868, Tampa Bay Rowdies, Louisville City, Detroit City, Hartford Athletic – 2012, 2014–23
- **Quenzi Huerman** – Colorado Springs Switchbacks, **Louisville City** – 2024–
- **Bertin Jacquesson** – Pittsburgh Riverhounds, **Oakland Roots** – 2024–
- Bradley Kamdem – Rochester Rhinos, Fresno FC, Saint Louis FC, Atlanta United 2 – 2016–22
- **Abdoulaye Kanté** – **Brooklyn FC** – 2026–
- Robin Lapert – Hartford Athletic – 2022–23
- **Yanis Leerman** – Loudoun United, **Tampa Bay Rowdies** – 2023–
- Simon Lefebvre – Loudoun United – 2020
- Gael Mabiala – Birmingham Legion – 2019
- Paul Marie – Reno 1868, Tampa Bay Rowdies – 2018, 2025
- Sylvain Marveaux – Charlotte Independence – 2021
- **Valentin Noël** – Las Vegas Lights, **New Mexico United** – 2024–
- Gabriel Obertan – Charlotte Independence – 2021
- Pierre Omanga – Rochester Rhinos – 2014
- Romuald Peiser – Penn FC – 2018
- Jason Pendant – New York Red Bulls II – 2021–22
- **Louis Perez** – Pittsburgh Riverhounds, North Carolina FC, **Tampa Bay Rowdies** – 2021, 2024–
- **Lilian Ricol** – **San Antonio FC** – 2026–
- **Ihsan Sacko** – **Phoenix Rising** – 2025–
- Clément Simonin – Toronto FC II – 2015–16
- Nicolas Taravel – Oklahoma City Energy – 2019–20
- Sofiane Tergou – Rochester Rhinos – 2016–17
- Steven Thicot – Charlotte Independence – 2019
- Toni Tiente – Atlanta United 2 – 2022
- Diedie Traore – LA Galaxy II, San Antonio FC – 2018–20, 2022
- **Guillaume Vacter** – **Pittsburgh Riverhounds** – 2025–
- **Florian Valot** – New York Red Bulls II, Miami FC, Loudoun United, **Oakland Roots** – 2016–19, 2021–

=== Georgia ===
- Irakli Khutsidze – Dayton Dutch Lions – 2013–14
- **Giorgi Lomtadze** – Monterey Bay FC, **Loudoun United** – 2026–
- Gagi Margvelashvili – Oakland Roots – 2024–25

=== Germany ===
- Philipp Beigl – New Mexico United – 2021
- Adrian Billhardt – Detroit City – 2023
- Charalampos Chantzopoulos – Sacramento Republic – 2019
- **Rafael Czichos** – **Phoenix Rising** – 2025–
- Morris Duggan – Rhode Island FC – 2024
- Julian Engels – Rochester Rhinos, LA Galaxy II – 2017–18
- Dennis Erdmann – Colorado Springs Switchbacks – 2022–23
- Wal Fall – Rochester Rhinos, Saint Louis FC, Ottawa Fury, Oakland Roots – 2016–21
- Sascha Görres – Richmond Kickers – 2011–16
- Christopher Hellmann – Charlotte Independence – 2016
- Fabian Herbers – Bethlehem Steel – 2016–18
- Marcel Kandziora – North Carolina FC – 2018
- **Lasse Kelp** – **Pittsburgh Riverhounds** – 2026–
- Kevin Kratz – Atlanta United 2 – 2018–19
- Tim Kübel – Toronto FC II – 2018
- Jeffrey Kyei – Pittsburgh Riverhounds – 2015
- **Tim Leibold** – **Sacramento Republic** – 2026–
- Jan-Erik Leinhos – Louisville City – 2022
- János Löbe – New York Red Bulls II, Miami FC – 2019–21
- Ben Lundt – Louisville City, Phoenix Rising – 2019–22
- Rafael Martell – Miami FC – 2025
- Nico Matern – Indy Eleven – 2018–19
- Malik McLemore – El Paso Locomotive – 2024
- Timo Mehlich – Rio Grande Valley FC Toros – 2020
- Kristian Nicht – Rochester Rhinos – 2012–13
- Yannik Oettl – Hartford Athletic, Indy Eleven – 2022–24
- Timo Pitter – Oklahoma City Energy FC – 2016
- Maurice Pluntke – Orange County Blues – 2016
- **Patrick Rakovsky** – Orange County SC, **Phoenix Rising** – 2021–
- Julian Ringhof – Rochester Rhinos, Arizona United – 2015–16
- Pablo Santana Soares – Las Vegas Lights – 2023
- Amir Šašivarević – Oklahoma City Energy – 2019
- Marcel Schäfer – Tampa Bay Rowdies – 2017–18
- Kevin Schindler – FC Cincinnati – 2017
- **Max Schneider** – Indy Eleven, **Tampa Bay Rowdies** – 2024, 2026–
- Felix Schröter – Tampa Bay Rowdies – 2023
- Yomi Scintu – Philadelphia Union II – 2019–20
- **Oliver Semmle** – Louisville City, North Carolina FC, **Lexington SC** – 2023, 2025–
- David Spies – Charlotte Independence – 2017
- Leo Stolz – New York Red Bulls II – 2015
- Mélé Temguia – FC Montreal, FC Cincinnati – 2015–17
- Mattia Trianni – Reno 1868 – 2019
- **Dominik Wanner** – **Sacramento Republic** – 2025–
- Gordon Wild – Charleston Battery, Atlanta United 2, Loudoun United, Indy Eleven – 2018–19, 2021
- **Milo Yosef** – FC Tulsa, **Lexington SC** – 2023–

=== Greece ===
- Vassilios Apostolopoulos – Rochester Rhinos – 2015–16
- Georgios Kyriazis – Rochester Rhinos – 2012–13
- Giannis Nikopolidis – New York Red Bulls II – 2022
- **Alexandros Tabakis** – Charleston Battery, North Carolina FC, New Mexico United, **FC Tulsa** – 2016–
- Stavros Zarokostas – Charleston Battery – 2020–21

=== Hungary ===
- Bence Pávkovics – El Paso Locomotive – 2023
- Dániel Sallói – Swope Park Rangers – 2016–17
- Barnabás Tanyi – Detroit City – 2022
- Benedek Tanyi – Detroit City – 2022
- Péter Tóth – Oklahoma City Energy – 2015–16

=== Iceland ===
- Óttar Magnús Karlsson – Oakland Roots – 2022
- Thorleifur Úlfarsson – Loudoun United – 2026

=== Ireland ===
- Paddy Barrett – FC Cincinnati, Indy Eleven – 2018–20
- Biko Bradnock-Brennan – San Antonio FC – 2016
- Kyle Callan-McFadden – Orlando City B – 2016
- **Stephen Carroll** – **Detroit City** – 2022–
- Dan Casey – Sacramento Republic – 2021–22
- James Chambers – Bethlehem Steel – 2016–19
- **Barry Coffey** – **Hartford Athletic** – 2026–
- Ryan Coulter – Rio Grande Valley FC Toros – 2020
- Iarfhlaith Davoren – Tulsa Roughnecks – 2015–16
- **Lee Desmond** – **Sacramento Republic** – 2022–
- Jordan Doherty – Tampa Bay Rowdies – 2019–21, 2023–24
- Mark Doyle – Rhode Island FC – 2024
- Danny Earls – Rochester Rhinos, Pittsburgh Riverhounds – 2012–17
- Colin Falvey – Charleston Battery, Ottawa Fury – 2011–14, 2018
- Derek Foran – Sacramento Republic – 2015–16
- Jon Gallagher – Atlanta United 2 – 2018–19
- Rob Kiernan – Orange County SC – 2020–22
- Niall McCabe – Louisville City – 2015–25
- Shane McEleney – Ottawa Fury – 2017
- Peter McGlynn – Sacramento Republic – 2017
- Liam Miller – Wilmington Hammerheads – 2016
- **Aaron Molloy** – Portland Timbers 2, Memphis 901, Charleston Battery, **Lexington SC** – 2020, 2022–
- Bobby Moseley – San Antonio FC – 2016
- **Harvey Neville** – Loudoun United, Sacramento Republic, Phoenix Rising, San Antonio FC, **Sporting Club Jacksonville** – 2023–
- Ethan O'Brien – **Indy Eleven** – 2024
- **Josh O'Brien** – **Indy Eleven** – 2024–
- Pearse O'Brien – Real Monarchs, Hartford Athletic – 2021–22
- James O'Connor – Orlando City – 2012–14
- Kevin O'Toole – New York Red Bulls II – 2016–17
- Stephen Roche – FC New York – 2011
- Richie Ryan – FC Cincinnati, El Paso Locomotive – 2018–22
- **Kieran Sadlier** – **Sporting Club Jacksonville** – 2026–
- Timi Sobowale – Real Monarchs – 2021
- Corey Whelan – Phoenix Rising – 2019–20

=== Israel ===
- Guy Abend – Louisville City, Reno 1868, Saint Louis FC – 2015–20
- **Yaniv Bazini** – **Orange County SC** – 2026–
- Idan Cohen – Hartford Athletic – 2020
- Dekel Keinan – FC Cincinnati, Sacramento Republic, Las Vegas Lights – 2018–22

=== Italy ===
- Luca Antonelli – Miami FC – 2021–22
- Manuel Botta – Miami FC – 2024
- Antonio Bua – Harrisburg City Islanders – 2013
- Giulio Doratiotto – Phoenix Rising – 2024–25
- Mattia Gagliardi – Miami FC – 2024
- Rocco Genzano – Miami FC – 2024
- **Marco Micaletto** – New Mexico United, Colorado Springs Switchbacks, **Tampa Bay Rowdies** – 2024–
- **Luca Piras** – **Loudoun United** – 2025–
- **Giorgio Probo** – **Las Vegas Lights** – 2025–
- Daniele Proch – North Carolina FC – 2020
- Claudio Repetto – Charleston Battery, Phoenix Rising, Miami FC – 2021–23
- Paolo Tornaghi – Whitecaps FC 2 – 2015

=== Montenegro ===
- **Emrah Klimenta** – Sacramento Republic, LA Galaxy II, Reno 1868, San Diego Loyal, Oakland Roots, **Las Vegas Lights** – 2014–
- **Luka Malešević** – Rio Grande Valley FC Toros, **Monterey Bay FC** – 2022, 2026–
- Luka Petričević – Orange County Blues – 2015
- Nemanja Vuković – Sacramento Republic, Tulsa Roughnecks – 2014–15, 2018

=== Netherlands ===
- Edson Braafheid – Austin Bold – 2019–20
- Sem de Wit – Whitecaps FC 2, FC Cincinnati, Hartford Athletic – 2016–19
- Wichert de Wit – Dayton Dutch Lions – 2013
- Nixon Dias – Dayton Dutch Lions – 2012
- **Osman Foyo** – **Rhode Island FC** – 2026–
- Jos Hooiveld – Orange County SC – 2018
- Tim Janssen – Oklahoma City Energy – 2016
- Collins John – Pittsburgh Riverhounds – 2014
- Remco Klaasse – Dayton Dutch Lions – 2013
- Kai Koreniuk – LA Galaxy II, San Antonio FC – 2019–21, 2023
- Daniël Krutzen – Phoenix Rising – 2023
- Marios Lomis – North Carolina FC, El Paso Locomotive – 2018–20
- Frank Olijve – Orange County SC – 2017
- Maarten Pouwels – Louisville City – 2023
- Lucien Seymour – Dayton Dutch Lions – 2011
- Marvin van der Pluijm – Dayton Dutch Lions – 2011
- Yesin van der Pluijm – Colorado Springs Switchbacks – 2022
- Ivar van Dinteren – Dayton Dutch Lions – 2011
- Jerry van Wolfgang – Orange County SC, Reno 1868 – 2017–19
- Vinnie Vermeer – Nashville SC, Las Vegas Lights – 2019
- Glenn Visser – Dayton Dutch Lions – 2013
- Tjeerd Westdijk – Dayton Dutch Lions – 2014
- Giliano Wijnaldum – Bethlehem Steel – 2017
- Julius Wille – Dayton Dutch Lions – 2011

=== North Macedonia ===
- Danny Musovski – Reno 1868, Las Vegas Lights – 2018–19, 2021–22
- Dragan Stojkov – LA Galaxy II, Saint Louis FC – 2014, 2017

=== Northern Ireland ===
- Ollie Bassett – Tampa Bay Rowdies – 2025
- Daniel Finlayson – Orange County SC – 2020
- Niall Logue – Memphis 901, Hartford Athletic, Oakland Roots – 2021–24
- Martin Maybin – Colorado Springs Switchbacks – 2015–16, 2018
- **Ryan McLaughlin** – **Brooklyn FC** – 2026–
- Owen Morrison – FC New York – 2011
- Cammy Palmer – Orange County SC – 2020
- Martin Paterson – Tampa Bay Rowdies – 2017
- Robin Shroot – Nashville SC – 2018
- Thomas Stewart – Sacramento Republic – 2014–16
- Kyle Vassell – San Diego Loyal, Colorado Springs Switchbacks – 2022, 2025

=== Norway ===
- Øyvind Alseth – Toronto FC II – 2017
- Morten Bjørshol – Las Vegas Lights, Orange County SC – 2022–23
- **Ryan Doghman** – **Orange County SC** – 2023–
- **Jonas Fjeldberg** – Rio Grande Valley FC Toros, Indy Eleven, **Colorado Springs Switchbacks** – 2021–
- Sivert Haugli – Phoenix Rising – 2022
- Eirik Johansen – Wilmington Hammerheads – 2015
- **Brigham Larsen** – **Pittsburgh Riverhounds** – 2025–
- Markus Naglestad – Hartford Athletic – 2020
- Markus Nakkim – Orange County SC – 2023–24
- Skage Simonsen – Loudoun United, Detroit City – 2022–23
- Mikael Tørset Johnsen – Oakland Roots – 2022
- Chris Wingate – Bethlehem Steel – 2017

=== Poland ===
- Dariusz Formella – Sacramento Republic, Oakland Roots, Phoenix Rising – 2019–25
- Oskar Gasecki – Saint Louis FC – 2015
- Konrad Plewa – New York Red Bulls II, Saint Louis FC, Real Monarchs – 2015–19
- Kacper Przybyłko – Bethlehem Steel – 2019
- Wojciech Wojcik – Oklahoma City Energy, Hartford Athletic – 2016–17, 2019
- Tomasz Zahorski – Charlotte Independence – 2015

=== Portugal ===
- Edinho Júnior – Harrisburg City Islanders – 2014
- **Diogo Pacheco** – FC Tulsa, **San Antonio FC** – 2024–
- Zé Pedro – Sporting Kansas City II – 2019–20
- Rafael Ramos – Orlando City, Orlando City B – 2014, 2016–17
- **Braudílio Rodrigues** – **Lexington SC** – 2025–
- **Pedro Santos** – **Loudoun United** – 2025–
- Januário Silva – Tulsa Roughnecks – 2019

=== Russia ===
- Rassambek Akhmatov – Swope Park Rangers – 2018–19
- **Dmitrii Erofeev** – **San Antonio FC** – 2025–
- Pavel Kondrakhin – Tulsa Roughnecks – 2017
- **Kirill Pakhomov** – **Charleston Battery** – 2026–
- Valeri Saramutin – Austin Bold – 2019–20

=== Scotland ===
- **Jack Blake** – Tampa Bay Rowdies, Real Monarchs, San Diego Loyal, **Indy Eleven** – 2018–
- Gary Cennerazzo – Tulsa Roughnecks – 2016
- Neill Collins – Tampa Bay Rowdies – 2017–18
- Alex Cooper – Fresno FC – 2018–19
- Ali Coote – Detroit City – 2024
- Robbie Crawford – Charleston Battery, Monterey Bay FC – 2020–24
- Christian Davidson – Wilmington Hammerheads – 2012–14
- Richard Foster – Detroit City – 2022
- **Greg Hurst** – Phoenix Rising, **New Mexico United** – 2022–
- Lewis Jamieson – Sacramento Republic – 2025
- **Stephen Kelly** – **Orange County SC** – 2025–
- Kevin Kerr – Pittsburgh Riverhounds – 2013–19
- Ross MacKenzie – Richmond Kickers – 2011–12
- Darren Mackie – Phoenix FC – 2013
- Cammy MacPherson – Tampa Bay Rowdies – 2025
- Calum Mallace – Seattle Sounders 2, Austin Bold – 2017, 2019
- Tam McManus – Rochester Rhinos – 2012–13
- Marc McNulty – Orange County SC – 2023
- Finn McRobb – Indy Eleven – 2025
- Adam Moffat – Sacramento Republic – 2017–18
- Scott Morrison – Phoenix FC, Arizona United – 2013–16
- Ryan O'Leary – LA/Orange County Blues – 2013–14
- Tom Parratt – Wilmington Hammerheads – 2011–16
- Nicki Paterson – Charleston Battery – 2011–13
- Mark Ridgers – Orlando City B – 2016
- **Nick Ross** – El Paso Locomotive, Sacramento Republic, **Monterey Bay FC** – 2019–
- Allan Russell – LA/Orange County Blues – 2012–14
- Sam Stanton – Phoenix Rising – 2020
- **Harvey St Clair** – **FC Tulsa** – 2024–
- Daniel Steedman – Charlotte Independence, Atlanta United 2 – 2018, 2020
- Ricky Waddell – Los Angeles Blues – 2012
- **Danny Wilson** – **Sporting Club Jacksonville** – 2026–

=== Serbia ===
- Denis Ahmetović – Saint Louis FC – 2017
- Tomislav Colić – Los Angeles Blues – 2011
- Aleksandar Đoković – LA Galaxy II – 2014
- Tyler Feeley – Orange County Blues, Saint Louis FC – 2015–17
- Ilija Ilić – Louisville City, Indy Eleven, New Mexico United – 2015–22
- **Stefan Lukić** – **FC Tulsa** – 2025–
- Ivan Mirković – Sacramento Republic, Orange County Blues, Saint Louis FC, Tulsa Roughnecks – 2014–18
- Milan Petošević – Saint Louis FC – 2017
- Pavle Popara – Orange County Blues – 2015–16
- Dusan Stevanovic – Orange County Blues – 2016–17
- Ilija Stolica – FC New York – 2011
- **Aleksandar Vuković** – **Phoenix Rising** – 2026–
- Boris Živanović – Pittsburgh Riverhounds – 2015

=== Slovenia ===
- Aaron Kačinari – FC Tulsa – 2024
- Jure Matjašič – Sacramento Republic – 2018

=== Spain ===
- José Aguinaga – New York Red Bulls II, Phoenix Rising, El Paso Locomotive – 2018–21
- Pablo Álvarez – Wilmington Hammerheads – 2015
- Borja Angoitia – Rio Grande Valley FC Toros, Toronto FC II – 2017–18
- Jesjua Angoy-Cruyff – Dayton Dutch Lions – 2014
- Álvaro Antón – FC Cincinnati – 2016
- **Hugo Bacharach** – **Rhode Island FC** – 2025–
- Jon Bakero – Tulsa Roughnecks, Toronto FC II, Phoenix Rising, Memphis 901 – 2018–21, 2024
- José Barril – Harrisburg City Islanders, Oklahoma City Energy – 2014–18
- **Miguel Berry** – San Diego Loyal, **Charleston Battery** – 2020–21, 2026–
- Victor Blasco – Whitecaps FC 2 – 2015
- **Nico Campuzano** – Monterey Bay FC, **Pittsburgh Riverhounds** – 2025–
- José Carrillo – El Paso Locomotive – 2023
- **Pep Casas** – **Sacramento Republic** – 2026–
- Oriol Cortes – Orange County Blues – 2016
- **Jesús de Vicente** – **Oakland Roots** – 2026–
- Ander Egiluz – El Paso Locomotive – 2022–23
- Ayoze García – Indy Eleven – 2018–22
- **David García** – **Oakland Roots** – 2026–
- Jorge González – Portland Timbers 2, Louisville City – 2020–24
- Josu – Wilmington Hammerheads, FC Cincinnati – 2016–18
- Keko – Sacramento Republic – 2022–23
- Ignacio Maganto – LA Galaxy II – 2015
- Fran Martínez – Wilmington Hammerheads – 2015
- Santi Moar – Bethlehem Steel, New Mexico United, Phoenix Rising – 2017–23
- Victor Muñoz – Arizona United – 2015
- Marc Navarro – El Paso Locomotive – 2023
- **Arturo Ordoñez** – Pittsburgh Riverhounds, Louisville City, Lexington SC, **Hartford Athletic** – 2022–
- Javi Pérez – Phoenix Rising – 2019
- Ian Pino – Louisville City – 2022
- Cristian Portilla – Ottawa Fury – 2018
- Jordi Quintillà – Swope Park Rangers – 2016
- David Rabadán – Philadelphia Union II – 2020
- Ruxi – FC Tulsa – 2023
- Marco Santana – Miami FC – 2024
- David Sierra – Sevilla FC Puerto Rico – 2011
- Toni Soler – New Mexico United – 2019
- Enric Vallès – Harrisburg City Islanders – 2015
- **Koke Vegas** – San Diego Loyal, **Rhode Island FC** – 2022–
- Damià Viader – Sacramento Republic – 2022–24
- Yuma – El Paso Locomotive – 2019–24

=== Sweden ===
- Oskar Ågren – Colorado Springs Switchbacks – 2023
- Alex Andersson – Colorado Springs Switchbacks – 2024
- Oliver Brynéus – Indy Eleven – 2025
- Adam Larsson – Monterey Bay FC – 2025
- Mark Lindstrom – Pittsburgh Riverhounds – 2020
- Adam Lundqvist – Rio Grande Valley FC Toros – 2018
- Erik McCue – Rio Grande Valley FC Toros, Charleston Battery, El Paso Locomotive – 2019–21, 2023
- Robert Mirosavic – Swope Park Rangers – 2017
- Linus Olsson – Oklahoma City Energy – 2016
- Petar Petrović – El Paso Locomotive – 2023–24
- Axel Sjöberg – San Antonio FC – 2020–21
- John Stenberg – Phoenix Rising – 2023–24

=== Switzerland ===
- Nicholas Ammeter – Las Vegas Lights – 2024–25
- Didier Crettenand – Orange County Blues – 2015–16
- **Lyam MacKinnon** – **Orange County SC** – 2025–
- Fabio Morelli – FC Montreal – 2015–16
- Brandon Onkony – Toronto FC II – 2017–18
- Tim Schmoll – New York Red Bulls II – 2016–17
- **Raphael Spiegel** – **Oakland Roots** – 2025–
- Nick von Niederhäusern – Reno 1868 – 2017
- Kay Voser – Charlotte Independence – 2018
- Timothie Zali – Las Vegas Lights – 2023

=== Turkey ===
- Emir Tombul – New York Red Bulls II – 2021

=== Ukraine ===
- Andriy Budnyi – Wilmington Hammerheads, VSI Tampa Bay FC – 2011–13
- Artem Kholod – El Paso Locomotive – 2022
- Denys Kostyshyn – El Paso Locomotive – 2023

=== Wales ===
- Chad Bond – Los Angeles Blues, Sacramento Republic, Tulsa Roughnecks, Saint Louis FC, Oklahoma City Energy – 2012, 2014–17
- Jonathan Brown – Oklahoma City Energy, Hartford Athletic – 2017–21
- Robert Earnshaw – Whitecaps FC 2 – 2015
- Gareth Evans – Wilmington Hammerheads, Oklahoma City Energy – 2011–16
- Josh Heard – Bethlehem Steel, Real Monarchs – 2016–19
- Adam Henley – Real Monarchs – 2018
- Anthony Pulis – Orlando City – 2012–14
- Matt Whatley – Tulsa Roughnecks – 2016
- Owain Fôn Williams – Indy Eleven – 2018

== CONMEBOL ==
=== Argentina ===
- Ignacio Bailone – San Antonio FC – 2020, 2022–23
- Fernando Matías Benítez – Atlanta United 2 – 2021
- **Lucio Berrón** – **San Antonio FC** – 2025–
- Santiago Biglieri – Portland Timbers 2 – 2015
- Sebastián Blanco – Miami FC – 2025
- **Francisco Bonfiglio** – **Miami FC** – 2025–
- Gerardo Bruna – Ottawa Fury – 2017–18
- Juan Pablo Caffa – Tulsa Roughnecks, Fresno FC – 2017–19
- Nicolás Campisi – Tampa Bay Rowdies, Miami FC – 2025
- Jonathan Caparelli – Real Monarchs – 2015–17
- **Samuel Careaga** – Memphis 901, **Hartford Athletic** – 2023–
- Francesco Celeste – Miami FC – 2025
- Tomás Conechny – Portland Timbers 2 – 2018–20
- Sebastián Contreras – El Paso Locomotive – 2019
- **Emil Cuello** – LA Galaxy II, **San Antonio FC**, Sacramento Republic, Phoenix Rising – 2019, 2021–
- Nicolás Czornomaz – Orange County SC – 2018
- Gonzalo Di Renzo – San Antonio FC – 2020
- Leo Díaz – Las Vegas Lights – 2023
- Franco Escobar – Atlanta United 2 – 2019
- Gastón Fernández – Portland Timbers 2 – 2015
- Lucas Fernández – Rochester Rhinos – 2012–13
- Matías Fissore – Oakland Roots – 2021–22
- Walter Gaitán – Los Angeles Blues – 2011
- Nicolás Giménez – Real Monarchs – 2020
- Brian Gómez – San Antonio FC – 2019
- Gabriel Gómez – Loudoun United – 2020
- Emmanuel Ledesma – FC Cincinnati, Indy Eleven, Las Vegas Lights – 2018, 2021, 2023
- Santiago Maidana – Tulsa Roughnecks – 2018
- Juan Mare – Real Monarchs – 2017–18
- Lucas Melano – Portland Timbers 2, Miami FC – 2018, 2025
- Diego Mercado – Miami FC – 2025
- Mariano Miño – Toronto FC II – 2018
- Martín Morello – River Plate Puerto Rico – 2011
- Cristian Ojeda – Portland Timbers 2 – 2019
- Luis Olivera – Sporting Kansas City II – 2019
- Norberto Paparatto – Portland Timbers 2 – 2015
- **Cristian Parano** – **San Antonio FC**, Sacramento Republic – 2019–20, 2022–
- Gustavo Paruolo – River Plate Puerto Rico – 2011
- Lucas Paulini – Richmond Kickers – 2016
- Rocco Ríos Novo – Atlanta United 2, Phoenix Rising – 2021–24
- **Agustín Rodríguez** – **Rhode Island FC** – 2026–
- **Matías Romero** – **Miami FC** – 2025–
- Pablo Rossi – Seattle Sounders FC 2 – 2015
- Pablo Ruíz – Real Monarchs – 2018–19
- Valentin Sabella – Charlotte Independence – 2019–21
- Lucas Scaglia – Las Vegas Lights – 2019
- Luis Solignac – San Antonio FC, El Paso Locomotive – 2020–24
- Guido Vadalá – Charlotte Independence – 2020
- Federico Varela – Phoenix Rising – 2023–24
- Joaquín Varela – San Antonio FC – 2021
- Cristian Vázquez – Miami FC – 2025
- Daniel Vega – Tampa Bay Rowdies – 2018
- Deian Verón – Miami FC – 2025
- Matías Zaldívar – Rio Grande Valley FC Toros – 2018
- Tobías Zárate – Miami FC – 2025

=== Bolivia ===
- Antonio Bustamante – Loudoun United – 2019
- Bruno Miranda – Richmond Kickers – 2018
- Efrain Morales – Atlanta United 2 – 2020–22

=== Brazil ===
- Adriano – Los Angeles Blues – 2011
- Adriano Francisco – Puerto Rico United – 2011
- Alex Freitas – VSI Tampa Bay – 2013
- Alexsander – Swope Park Rangers – 2019
- Allan Aniz – Miami FC – 2024
- Amarildo – New York Red Bulls II – 2019
- Anderson Conceição – Bethlehem Steel – 2016
- André Lima – Austin Bold – 2019–20
- Antonio Neto – VSI Tampa Bay – 2013
- Ayrton – Swope Park Rangers – 2016
- Beckham – Dayton Dutch Lions – 2014
- **Bruno Lapa** – Birmingham Legion, Memphis 901, FC Tulsa, **Oakland Roots** – 2020–24, 2026–
- Bruno Perone – Wilmington Hammerheads – 2016
- Diego Faria – Phoenix FC – 2013
- Diego Martins – Charlotte Eagles – 2011
- Diego Walsh – Charleston Battery – 2011
- Douglas dos Santos – VSI Tampa Bay – 2013
- Erick – Harrisburg City Islanders – 2015
- Fernando Timbó – Austin Aztex, Orlando City B – 2015, 2017
- Fred – Bethlehem Steel – 2016
- **Gabriel Alves** – Birmingham Legion, Rhode Island FC, **Brooklyn FC** – 2023–24, 2026–
- Gabriel Cabral – Miami FC – 2023–24
- **Gabriel Torres** – Hartford Athletic, FC Tulsa, Phoenix Rising, **El Paso Locomotive** – 2020–
- Gerson dos Santos – Richmond Kickers – 2011–12
- Gilberto – Sacramento Republic FC – 2014–15
- Guaraci – Austin Aztex – 2015
- Gui Brandao – Charlotte Eagles – 2014
- Guilherme – Dayton Dutch Lions – 2014
- Gustavo Rissi – Austin Bold, Indy Eleven, Miami FC – 2019–21, 2023
- **Ian** – **FC Tulsa** – 2025–
- Ivan Magalhães – Rio Grande Valley FC Toros, Tampa Bay Rowdies – 2016–18
- Jackson – Fresno FC – 2019
- Jeanderson – Portland Timbers 2 – 2015
- **Jean Mota** – **Sporting Club Jacksonville** – 2026–
- **Judson** – **Monterey Bay FC** – 2026–
- Juninho – Puerto Rico United – 2011
- Kléber – Austin Bold – 2019–20
- Leandro Carrijó – El Paso Locomotive – 2020–21
- Lennon – Real Monarchs – 2015–16
- **Leo Afonso** – **Rhode Island FC** – 2026–
- Leo Fernandes – Harrisburg City Islanders, Bethlehem Steel, Tampa Bay Rowdies – 2013–14, 2016–25
- Léo Pereira – Orlando City B – 2017
- Leonardo – LA Galaxy II, Orange County SC – 2014, 2016, 2019
- Luan – Harrisburg City Islanders – 2014
- Luca Lobo – Tulsa Roughnecks – 2019
- Lucas Baldin – Real Monarchs – 2015
- Lucas Cordeiro – Tulsa Roughnecks – 2015
- Lucas Coutinho – FC Tulsa – 2021
- Lucas Silva – San Antonio FC – 2024
- Lucas Turci – Memphis 901 – 2022–24
- Lucas Farias – Indy Eleven – 2019
- Luisinho – Miami FC – 2024
- Luiz Fernando – Richmond Kickers, Atlanta United 2, Memphis 901, New Mexico United – 2016–20, 2022–25
- Maicon – FC Tulsa – 2020
- Marcelo Sarvas – LA Galaxy II – 2014
- **Marcos Dias** – **Loudoun United** – 2026–
- **Marcos Serrato** – **FC Tulsa** – 2025–
- Marlon – FC Tulsa, Birmingham Legion, Memphis 901 – 2019–22, 2024
- Matheus Diovany – Dayton Dutch Lions – 2014
- Matheus Rossetto – Atlanta United 2 – 2021
- Matheus Silva – Arizona United, Reno 1868, Swope Park Rangers, Hartford Athletic, FC Tulsa – 2016–18, 2020, 2022
- Mattheus Oliveira – Tampa Bay Rowdies – 2026
- Mauricio Salles – Charlotte Eagles, VSI Tampa Bay – 2012–13
- Nathan Fogaça – San Antonio FC – 2021, 2023
- **Nicolas Firmino** – Atlanta United 2, **Lexington SC** – 2022, 2025–
- Netinho – Phoenix FC – 2013
- Oliver – Richmond Kickers – 2017
- Paulo Pita – North Carolina FC – 2020
- PC – Orlando City B, San Antonio FC – 2017, 2020–23
- Pecka – Real Monarchs, San Antonio FC, North Carolina FC – 2015, 2017–20
- **Pedro Cruz** – **El Paso Locomotive** – 2026–
- **Pedro Dolabella** – North Carolina FC, **Tampa Bay Rowdies** – 2025–
- Pedro Ribeiro – Harrisburg City Islanders, Orlando City B, Fresno FC – 2014, 2016–18
- **Rafael Mentzingen** – Memphis 901, North Carolina FC, **Detroit City** – 2020, 2024–
- Raimar – Atlanta United 2 – 2022
- Reiner Ferreira – Indy Eleven – 2018
- Renan – Tulsa Roughnecks – 2019
- Renan Boufleur – Phoenix FC, Orlando City – 2013
- Renan Ribeiro – Hartford Athletic – 2024
- Rodolfo – Fresno FC, Atlanta United 2 – 2018
- **Rodrigo da Costa** – FC Tulsa, Memphis 901, North Carolina FC, **Miami FC** – 2019–
- Rômulo Peretta – Richmond Kickers – 2016
- Sérgio – Seattle Sounders FC 2 – 2015
- Stefano Pinho – Austin Bold, Indy Eleven, Birmingham Legion – 2021–24
- Tadeu Terra – FC New York – 2011
- Taiberson – Rio Grande Valley FC Toros – 2020
- Thiago De Freitas – Ottawa Fury – 2019
- Tiago Calvano – Penn FC – 2017–18
- Ualefi – Swope Park Rangers – 2016
- Victor Araujo – San Antonio FC – 2016–17
- Victor Souto – Pittsburgh Riverhounds – 2017
- Vini Dantas – Pittsburgh Riverhounds – 2015
- Vinicius – Orange County SC – 2019

=== Chile ===
- José Bizama – Charlotte Independence – 2021
- Fabián Cerda – Tulsa Roughnecks – 2017–18
- Claudio Muñoz – Tulsa Roughnecks – 2018
- Adolfo Ovalle – Real Monarchs – 2015
- Vicente Reyes – Atlanta United 2 – 2020–22
- Diego Rubio – Swope Park Rangers – 2016–18
- Jorge Troncoso – Austin Bold – 2019–21
- Francisco Ugarte – Tulsa Roughnecks – 2017–18
- Gustavo Zamudio – Rochester Rhinos – 2012

=== Colombia ===
- Tomás Ángel – Phoenix Rising FC – 2024
- José Angulo – Harrisburg City Islanders, Pittsburgh Riverhounds, Saint Louis FC, Oklahoma City Energy, Hartford Athletic – 2011, 2013–14, 2017–19
- Juan Arbelaez – Richmond Kickers – 2013–14
- Victor Arboleda – Portland Timbers 2 – 2016–17
- Jhonny Arteaga – FC New York, Pittsburgh Riverhounds – 2011, 2013–15
- Dairon Asprilla – Portland Timbers 2 – 2015–19
- Daniel Bedoya – New York Red Bulls II, Hartford Athletic – 2015, 2019
- Kley Bejarano – Colorado Springs Switchbacks – 2015
- Cristian Bonilla – San Antonio FC – 2022
- Michael Bustamante – Charlotte Independence – 2015
- Juan Cabezas – Rio Grande Valley FC Toros – 2019, 2021–23
- David Cabrera – Rio Grande Valley FC Toros – 2018–19
- Wilmer Cabrera Jr. – Rio Grande Valley FC Toros – 2018–19
- Vincenzo Candela – Charleston Battery – 2018–19
- **Juan Carvajal** – **Phoenix Rising** – 2026–
- Juan Castillo – New York Red Bulls II – 2021–22
- Rafael Castillo – San Antonio FC – 2016–19
- Héctor Copete – Rio Grande Valley FC Toros – 2019
- Francisco Córdoba – Charlotte Independence – 2015
- Andrés Correa – Seattle Sounders FC 2 – 2015
- Santiago Echavarría – Las Vegas Lights – 2019–20
- Juan Galindrez – Rio Grande Valley FC Toros – 2023
- Olmes García – Real Monarchs – 2016
- **Santiago García** – **Miami FC** – 2026–
- Frank Gaviria – Rio Grande Valley FC Toros – 2022
- Brayan Gómez – Real Monarchs – 2021
- Mário Gómez – Charlotte Eagles – 2014
- Manny González – Tulsa Roughnecks – 2019
- Juan Guzmán – Charlotte Eagles, Louisville City, Oklahoma City Energy, New Mexico United – 2011–15, 2017–21
- Felipe Hernández – Sporting Kansas City II – 2017–
- Jorge Herrera – Charlotte Eagles, Charlotte Independence – 2011–19
- Juan Sebastián Herrera – Sacramento Republic – 2023–25
- Cristian Higuita – Orlando City B – 2016
- Edwin Laszo – FC Tulsa, Birmingham Legion – 2024–25
- Mauro Manotas – Rio Grande Valley FC Toros – 2016
- Jimmy Medranda – Oklahoma City Energy, Swope Park Rangers, Tacoma Defiance, San Antonio FC – 2014, 2016, 2019, 2021, 2025
- Sergio Mena – Rio Grande Valley FC Toros – 2019
- Jonathan Mendoza – Orlando City, Rochester Rhinos, Orlando City B, Harrisburg City Islanders – 2013–17
- Camilo Monroy – Rio Grande Valley FC Toros – 2017–19
- José Mulato – San Antonio FC – 2024
- Juan Niño – Charlotte Eagles, San Antonio FC – 2013, 2017
- Junior Palacios – Miami FC – 2021–22, 2024
- Juan Palma – Charleston Battery – 2023–24
- **Luis Paredes** – **San Antonio FC** – 2025–
- Carlos Patiño – Seattle Sounders FC 2 – 2015–16
- **Santiago Patiño** – **San Antonio FC** – 2021–23, 2025–
- Martín Payares – El Paso Locomotive – 2022
- Anuar Peláez – Oakland Roots – 2023
- Juan David Ramírez – Austin Bold – 2019
- Bryam Rebellón – LA Galaxy II, Swope Park Rangers, El Paso Locomotive, Indy Eleven – 2016, 2018–23
- Wálter Restrepo – Bethlehem Steel, Tampa Bay Rowdies, San Antonio FC – 2016–17, 2019
- Andrés Reyes – New York Red Bulls II – 2021–22
- Kevin Riascos – Charlotte Independence – 2021
- Carlos Rivas – New York Red Bulls II – 2018
- Wilmar Rivas – El Paso Locomotive – 2024
- **Arney Rocha** – **Miami FC** – 2026–
- **Dani Rovira** – Pittsburgh Riverhounds, **Rhode Island FC** – 2019–
- **Camilo Sánchez** – **Charleston Battery** – 2026–
- John Henry Sánchez – Rio Grande Valley FC Toros – 2021
- Kevin Saucedo – Real Monarchs – 2021
- Eddie Segura – Las Vegas Lights – 2022
- José Luis Sinisterra – Oakland Roots – 2024–25
- Almir Soto – San Antonio FC – 2025
- **Juan David Torres** – Charleston Battery, **Phoenix Rising** – 2024–
- Sebastián Velásquez – Real Monarchs, El Paso Locomotive, Miami FC, Memphis 901, Indy Eleven – 2017–23
- Eduard Zea – Arizona United – 2015

=== Ecuador ===
- Camilo Benítez – Swope Park Rangers – 2018
- **Jeciel Cedeno** – New York Red Bulls II, Hartford Athletic, Oakland Roots, **Detroit City** – 2019, 2021–
- Victor Manosalvas – New York Red Bulls II – 2015
- Andrés Mendoza – Wilmington Hammerheads – 2015
- Jose Nazareno – Charleston Battery – 2016
- Stiven Plaza – New York Red Bulls II – 2022
- Josimar Quintero – Real Monarchs – 2021
- Nicholas Rabiu – New York Red Bulls II – 2021

=== Paraguay ===
- Carlos Coronel – Bethlehem Steel – 2019
- Erik López – Atlanta United 2 – 2021
- Gabriel Perrotta – Pittsburgh Riverhounds – 2024

=== Peru ===
- Nelson Becerra – Harrisburg City Islanders – 2011
- Gerardo Bravo – Los Angeles Blues – 2011
- Jhonny Bravo – Los Angeles Blues – 2011
- Renato Bustamante – Fresno FC – 2018–19
- Collin Fernandez – Louisville City, Saint Louis FC, FC Tulsa, Phoenix Rising, Tacoma Defiance, Austin Bold – 2017–21, 2023
- Marcos López – Reno 1868 – 2020
- David Mejia – Atlanta United 2, Miami FC – 2020–22, 2024
- **Alessandro Milesi** – **Miami FC** – 2026–
- **Diego Otoya** – **Monterey Bay FC** – 2026–

=== Uruguay ===
- Sebastián Guenzatti – Tampa Bay Rowdies, Indy Eleven, Detroit City – 2017–25
- Alex Martínez – Orange County Blues, Charlotte Independence – 2014–19
- Enzo Martínez – Charlotte Independence, Birmingham Legion – 2015–17, 2019–25
- Nicolás Mezquida – Whitecaps FC 2 – 2015
- Lucas Monzón – New York Red Bulls II – 2021–22
- Bryan Olivera – LA Galaxy II – 2015
- Gonzalo Pelúa – El Paso Locomotive – 2024
- Jhon Pírez – Tulsa Roughnecks – 2018
- Max Rauhofer – Real Monarchs, Orange County Blues – 2015–17
- Diego Rodríguez – Whitecaps FC 2 – 2015
- **Felipe Rodríguez** – **Miami FC** – 2024–
- Felipe Rodríguez – Miami FC – 2025
- Vicente Sánchez – Rio Grande Valley FC Toros – 2021
- Marcelo Silva – Real Monarchs – 2018
- **Sebastian Tregarthen** – **Birmingham Legion** – 2025–
- Santiago Viera – San Antonio FC – 2020

=== Venezuela ===
- **Manuel Arteaga** – Indy Eleven, Phoenix Rising, Tampa Bay Rowdies, **Las Vegas Lights** – 2021–
- Juan Carlos Azócar – Rio Grande Valley FC Toros, Oakland Roots, San Antonio FC, Phoenix Rising, Tampa Bay Rowdies – 2020–25
- Gabriel Benítez – Rio Grande Valley FC Toros – 2023
- Jovanny Bolívar – Loudoun United – 2021
- Pablo Bonilla – Portland Timbers 2 – 2020
- Wikelman Carmona – New York Red Bulls II – 2021–22
- Cristian Cásseres Jr. – New York Red Bulls II – 2018–19
- Jesús Castellano – New York Red Bulls II – 2022
- Mauro Cichero – Charleston Battery – 2020–22
- Alejandro Fuenmayor – Rio Grande Valley FC Toros, Oakland Roots, Phoenix Rising – 2019, 2022–24
- Erickson Gallardo – Phoenix Rising – 2023–24
- Christian Gómez – Hartford Athletic – 2021
- Juan Guerra – Indy Eleven – 2018
- José Hernández – Atlanta United 2 – 2018–19
- Ronald Hernández – Atlanta United 2 – 2021
- Brayan Hurtado – Portland Timbers 2 – 2019
- Arnold López – Sacramento Republic – 2023
- Darwin Matheus – Atlanta United 2, Birmingham Legion – 2021–22, 2024
- **Alejandro Mitrano** – Las Vegas Lights, Miami FC, **Indy Eleven** – 2023–
- Darluis Paz – Loudoun United – 2021
- Eduin Quero – Rio Grande Valley FC Toros – 2021
- Jeizon Ramírez – Real Monarchs – 2021
- **Edgardo Rito** – New York Red Bulls II, Oakland Roots, Hartford Athletic, Phoenix Rising, **Sporting Club Jacksonville** – 2019–20, 2022–
- Victor Rojas – Las Vegas Lights – 2019
- Luis Manuel Seijas – Phoenix Rising – 2021–22
- Williams Velásquez – Portland Timbers 2 – 2020
- Renzo Zambrano – Portland Timbers 2, Phoenix Rising – 2017–19, 2023–24

== CAF ==
=== Angola ===
- Estrela – Orlando City – 2014
- Sergio Manesio – Ottawa Fury – 2017–18

=== Benin ===
- Femi Hollinger-Janzen – Tulsa Roughnecks, Birmingham Legion – 2018–19
- Don Tchilao – LA Galaxy II – 2019

=== Burkina Faso ===
- Ibrahim Bancé – Real Monarchs – 2021
- Trova Boni – San Antonio FC – 2023–24
- Ousseni Bouda – Monterey Bay FC – 2024
- Mohamed Kone – Tampa Bay Rowdies – 2019

=== Burundi ===
- Irakoze Donasiyano – Oklahoma City Energy, Phoenix Rising, Oakland Roots – 2021–24
- Bienvenue Kanakimana – Atlanta United 2 – 2019
- Chancel Ndaye – Las Vegas Lights – 2020
- **Pacifique Niyongabire** – Tampa Bay Rowdies, **Loudoun United** – 2024–

=== Cameroon ===
- Anatole Abang – New York Red Bulls II – 2015–16, 2018
- Thomas Amang – Colorado Springs Switchbacks, San Diego Loyal, Orange County SC, New Mexico United – 2021–25
- Brian Anunga – Wilmington Hammerheads, Charleston Battery – 2015, 2017–19
- Eric Ati – Wilmington Hammerheads – 2016
- Eric Ayuk – Harrisburg City Islanders, Bethlehem Steel – 2015–16, 2018
- Aaron Bibout – Detroit City, FC Tulsa – 2023–24
- Christian Bassogog – Wilmington Hammerheads – 2015
- Felix Chenkam – Seattle Sounders 2 – 2017–18
- **Albert Dikwa** – Orlando City B, Saint Louis FC, **Pittsburgh Riverhounds**, Rhode Island FC – 2017–
- Pascal Eboussi – Colorado Springs Switchbacks, San Antonio FC – 2017–19
- Samuel Edoung-Biyo – Rochester Rhinos – 2017
- Rodrigue Ele – Seattle Sounders 2 – 2017–18
- Charles Eloundou – Charlotte Independence, Colorado Springs Switchbacks – 2015
- Jean Jospin Engola – LA Galaxy II – 2017–18
- **Ascel Essengue** – LA Galaxy II, **Phoenix Rising**, Loudoun United – 2021–22, 2025–
- Jeannot Esua – Orange County SC – 2017
- Lionel Etoundi – Real Monarchs – 2019
- Donovan Ewolo – North Carolina FC – 2018–19
- William Eyang – Orlando City B, Pittsburgh Riverhounds – 2016, 2022
- Faris – Bethlehem Steel – 2018–19
- Jacques Haman – FC Montreal – 2015–16
- Cyprian Hedrick – Phoenix FC, Oklahoma City Energy, San Antonio FC, FC Tulsa – 2013–20
- Steve Kingue – Philadelphia Union II – 2019–20
- Olivier Mbaizo – Bethlehem Steel – 2018–19
- Jerome Mbekeli – Swope Park Rangers, San Diego Loyal – 2019–20
- Fabrice Mbvouvouma – FC Montreal – 2015–16
- Alexis Meva – Portland Timbers 2 – 2016
- **Jean Moursou** – **Phoenix Rising** – 2025–
- Joseph Nane – Oakland Roots – 2021–23
- Hassan Ndam – New York Red Bulls II, Charlotte Independence, Miami FC, Orange County SC – 2017–20, 2022
- **Mathieu Ndongo** – Rhode Island FC, **Miami FC** – 2025–
- J.C. Ngando – Las Vegas Lights – 2024
- Mark O'Ojong – Seattle Sounders FC 2, San Antonio FC – 2016–17
- Marius Obekop – New York Red Bulls II, Orlando City B – 2015–16
- Pele Ousmanou – Hartford Athletic – 2024
- Bertrand Owundi – Charlotte Independence – 2018
- Moise Pouaty – Colorado Springs Switchbacks – 2017–18
- **Tabort Etaka Preston** – Las Vegas Lights, San Antonio FC, Hartford Athletic, New Mexico United, Birmingham Legion, **Detroit City** – 2019–
- Yann Songo'o – Orlando City – 2013
- Ayukokata També – Colorado Springs Switchbacks – 2018
- Uzi Tayou – Tulsa Roughnecks – 2018
- Nouhou Tolo – Seattle Sounders FC 2 – 2016–18
- Duval Wapiwo – North Carolina FC, Sporting Kansas City II – 2019–20
- Yomby William – Richmond Kickers – 2011–18
- Jules Youmeni – Orlando City B – 2017
- Andre Ulrich Zanga – LA Galaxy II – 2017–18

=== Cape Verde ===
- Graciano Brito – FC New York, Rochester Rhinos – 2011–12
- Antonio Correia – Rochester Rhinos – 2017
- Steevan Dos Santos – Rochester Rhinos, Ottawa Fury, Pittsburgh Riverhounds, Tampa Bay Rowdies – 2015–22
- Wuilito Fernandes – Orange County SC, North Carolina FC – 2017–18
- Kévin Oliveira – Swope Park Rangers, Ottawa Fury – 2016–19

=== Comoros ===
- **Alexis Souahy** – Louisville City, New Mexico United, FC Tulsa, **San Antonio FC** – 2018–22, 2024–

=== Congo ===
- **Brunallergene Etou** – Charlotte Independence, Tampa Bay Rowdies, **Pittsburgh Riverhounds** – 2020–
- Cabwey Kivutuka – Charlotte Independence – 2019
- Raddy Ovouka – New Mexico United – 2022

=== DR Congo ===
- Jeremy Bokila – Oakland Roots – 2021
- Ladislas Bushiri – Los Angeles Blues – 2012
- **Beverly Makangila** – San Diego Loyal, Colorado Springs Switchbacks, **Hartford Athletic** – 2020–
- Parfait Mandanda – Hartford Athletic – 2020
- Ariel Mbumba – Oakland Roots – 2021–22
- Tresor Mbuyu – Charlotte Independence – 2020–21
- Enoch Mushagalusa – Sporting Kansas City II, Louisville City, San Diego Loyal, Hartford Athletic, Pittsburgh Riverhounds – 2020–24
- Chiró N'Toko – El Paso Locomotive – 2019–20
- **Michee Ngalina** – Bethlehem Steel, Colorado Springs Switchbacks, **Hartford Athletic** – 2018–19, 2021–22, 2024–
- Ben Numbi – Tacoma Defiance – 2019
- Ferrety Sousa – Wilmington Hammerheads, Las Vegas Lights, Sacramento Republic – 2016, 2019, 2022–23
- Distel Zola – El Paso Locomotive, Charlotte Independence – 2020–21

=== Eritrea ===
- Yohannes Harish – Oakland Roots – 2021

=== Ethiopia ===
- Sammy Kahsai – Pittsburgh Riverhounds – 2019

=== Gambia ===
- Seedy Bah – Charleston Battery – 2011
- Hamza Barry – LA Galaxy II – 2022
- Mamadou Danso – North Carolina FC, Portland Timbers 2 – 2018, 2020
- Modou Jadama – FC Tulsa, Portland Timbers 2, Atlanta United 2, Hartford Athletic – 2017–22
- Karamba Janneh – VSI Tampa Bay, Dayton Dutch Lions – 2013–14
- Ebrima Jatta – Los Angeles Blues – 2012
- Lamin Jawneh – Atlanta United 2, Phoenix Rising – 2020–22
- Bubacarr Jobe – Toronto FC II – 2015–17
- Ismaila Jome – Nashville SC, Colorado Springs Switchbacks, Austin Bold, San Antonio FC – 2018–20, 2023
- Abdoulie Mansally – Rio Grande Valley FC Toros, Charlotte Independence – 2016, 2019
- Modou Ndow – Tacoma Defiance – 2019
- **Baboucarr Njie** – Atlanta United 2, Rio Grande Valley FC Toros, Phoenix Rising, Oakland Roots, **Hartford Athletic** – 2020–
- Amadou Sanyang – Charleston Battery, Seattle Sounders FC 2 – 2012–15
- Omar Sowe – New York Red Bulls II – 2019–21
- Sainey Touray – Harrisburg City Islanders, Austin Aztex – 2011–13, 2015

=== Ghana ===
- Aminu Abdallah – Charleston Battery – 2014
- Mohammed Abu – San Antonio FC – 2021–24
- Lalas Abubakar – Pittsburgh Riverhounds – 2017
- Geoffrey Acheampong – LA Galaxy II – 2018–19
- Ebenezer Ackon – San Antonio FC, San Diego Loyal – 2019, 2022–23
- **Wahab Ackwei** – New York Red Bulls II, Loudoun United, Rio Grande Valley FC Toros, Colorado Springs Switchbacks, El Paso Locomotive, **Sporting Club Jacksonville** – 2018, 2021–
- Emmanuel Adjetey – Charleston Battery – 2013–16
- **Forster Ajago** – Lexington SC, **Sacramento Republic** – 2025–
- Kalif Alhassan – Oklahoma City Energy – 2018
- Amass Amankona – Real Monarchs, Indy Eleven – 2016, 2018
- **Elvis Amoh** – Loudoun United, Rio Grande Valley FC Toros, **Colorado Springs Switchbacks**, Hartford Athletic, Detroit City, Indy Eleven – 2019–
- Richmond Antwi – Phoenix Rising – 2022
- **Seth Antwi** – **Birmingham Legion** – 2026–
- Emmanuel Appiah – Charlotte Independence, Swope Park Rangers, Saint Louis FC, LA Galaxy II – 2016–18
- Samuel Appiah – Pittsburgh Riverhounds – 2011
- Gideon Asante – Charlotte Eagles – 2014
- Samuel Asante – Charlotte Eagles, Richmond Kickers – 2013–17
- Solomon Asante – Phoenix Rising, Indy Eleven, Las Vegas Lights – 2018–24
- Nii Armah Ashitey – Hartford Athletic – 2021
- Anderson Asiedu – Atlanta United 2, Birmingham Legion, Hartford Athletic – 2019–24
- Francis Atuahene – Oklahoma City Energy, Austin Bold, San Diego Loyal, Memphis 901, Detroit City – 2018–22
- **Hope Avayevu** – **Phoenix Rising** – 2025–
- Gladson Awako – Phoenix Rising – 2017–18
- Jordan Ayimbila – San Antonio FC, Las Vegas Lights, Miami FC – 2022–24
- Gideon Baah – New York Red Bulls II – 2016–17
- Fifi Baiden – Dayton Dutch Lions – 2014
- Isaac Bawa – LA Galaxy II – 2020–21
- James Bissue – Pittsburgh Riverhounds – 2016
- Latif Blessing – Swope Park Rangers, Lexington SC – 2017, 2025–26
- Daniel Bloyou – Hartford Athletic – 2023
- Panin Boakye – FC Tulsa – 2019–20
- Roy Boateng – New York Red Bulls II – 2019–20
- Razak Cromwell – Birmingham Legion – 2019–20
- Abu Danladi – New Mexico United – 2024
- Kwasi Donsu – Colorado Springs Switchbacks – 2019
- Dennis Dowouna – Miami FC – 2022–23
- Haminu Draman – Charlotte Independence – 2015
- **Aaron Essel** – **Sacramento Republic** – 2026–
- Evans Frimpong – Oklahoma City Energy – 2016
- Prosper Kasim – Birmingham Legion – 2019–24
- Isaac Kissi – Rochester Rhinos – 2011–12
- Gershon Koffie – Indy Eleven – 2021
- Owusu-Ansah Kontoh – Orange County SC, Phoenix Rising – 2018–20
- Enock Kwakwa – Charleston Battery – 2022
- Moses Mensah – Birmingham Legion – 2023–25
- Ropapa Mensah – Harrisburg City Islanders, Nashville SC, Pittsburgh Riverhounds, Sporting Kansas City II – 2017–21
- Rudolf Mensah – Birmingham Legion – 2020
- Abass Mohamed – Harrisburg City Islanders – 2017
- Modou Ndow – Tacoma Defiance – 2019
- Rashid Nuhu – New York Red Bulls II – 2019
- Anthony Obodai – Phoenix FC, Pittsburgh Riverhounds – 2013–14
- Emmanuel Ocran – Real Monarchs – 2017
- Dominic Oduro – Tampa Bay Rowdies, Memphis 901, Charleston Battery – 2018–22
- Dominic Oduro – Charlotte Independence – 2019
- Stephen Okai – Charlotte Eagles, Orange County Blues, Pittsburgh Riverhounds – 2013–17
- **Abraham Okyere** – **Las Vegas Lights** – 2026–
- Kofi Opare – LA Galaxy II, Colorado Springs Switchbacks – 2014, 2019
- Edward Opoku – Saint Louis FC, Birmingham Legion – 2018–19
- Fredrick Yamoah Opoku – Penn FC – 2017–18
- Kwadwo Opoku – Las Vegas Lights – 2021
- William Opoku Mensah – Swope Park Rangers – 2019
- **Illal Osumanu** – **Pittsburgh Riverhounds** – 2023–
- Eric Oteng – Las Vegas Lights – 2023
- Jeffrey Otoo – Charleston Battery – 2016–17
- Kwadwo Poku – Wilmington Hammerheads, Tampa Bay Rowdies – 2015, 2018–19
- Fatawu Safiu – Portland Timbers 2, Whitecaps FC 2 – 2015–16
- Lloyd Sam – Miami FC – 2020
- Fred Sekyere – Charlotte Eagles, Richmond Kickers – 2014–18
- Michael Tetteh – Orlando City – 2011
- Rashid Tetteh – New Mexico United, FC Tulsa – 2019–24
- Ema Twumasi – Oklahoma City Energy, Austin Bold – 2018–20
- Oscar Umar – Saint Louis FC – 2019–20
- Gideon Waja – Toronto FC II – 2018
- Ibrahim Yaro – Colorado Springs Switchbacks – 2019
- Joshua Yaro – Bethlehem Steel, San Antonio FC, San Diego Loyal – 2016, 2018–21
- Michael Yeboah – Las Vegas Lights – 2021

=== Guinea ===
- Hadji Barry – Orlando City B, Swope Park Rangers, Ottawa Fury, North Carolina FC, Colorado Springs Switchbacks, Hartford Athletic – 2016–22, 2025
- Mamadi Camara – Colorado Springs Switchbacks – 2020
- Michel Guilavogui – Rochester Rhinos – 2016
- Pa Konate – FC Cincinnati – 2018
- Florentin Pogba – Atlanta United 2 – 2019
- Amara Soumah – Pittsburgh Riverhounds – 2015

=== Guinea-Bissau ===
- **Junior Moreira** – **Hartford Athletic** – 2025–
- Bura Nogueira – San Antonio FC – 2024
- Eti Tavares – Real Monarchs, Tulsa Roughnecks – 2015–16, 2018

=== Ivory Coast ===
- Ballobi – Tulsa Roughnecks – 2016
- Zoumana Diarra – Loudoun United – 2022
- Didier Drogba – Phoenix Rising – 2017–18
- Levi Houapeu – Rochester Rhinos – 2014
- **Nanan Houssou** – Loudoun United, New Mexico United, **Charleston Battery** – 2021–
- **Laurent Kissiedou** – **Charleston Battery**, Atlanta United 2, Memphis 901, Detroit City – 2017–19, 2021–24, 2026–
- Abdoul Koanda – Loudoun United – 2023
- Jean-Christophe Koffi – New York Red Bulls II, Memphis 901, Loudoun United – 2019–20, 2022
- Cheick Kone – Orange County SC – 2025
- Doueugui Mala – Phoenix Rising – 2017–19
- Henri Manhebo – Tulsa Roughnecks – 2015–16
- Chris-Kévin Nadje – Monterey Bay FC – 2026
- **Gaoussou Samaké** – Loudoun United, **Las Vegas Lights** – 2021–
- Abdoul Zanne – Loudoun United – 2022

=== Kenya ===
- **Nabilai Kibunguchy** – Sacramento Republic, **Indy Eleven** – 2021, 2026–
- Philip Mayaka – Colorado Springs Switchbacks – 2021
- Joseph Okumu – Real Monarchs – 2018–19
- Lawrence Olum – Orlando City, Miami FC – 2011, 2020
- Brian Ombiji – Harrisburg City Islanders – 2011–12
- **William Wilson** – **FC Tulsa** – 2026–

=== Lesotho ===
- Sunny Jane – Wilmington Hammerheads, Richmond Kickers, Louisville City – 2014–17, 2019
- Napo Matsoso – Louisville City, Oakland Roots – 2019–24

=== Liberia ===
- Othello Bah – Miami FC – 2020–22
- Seku Conneh – Bethlehem Steel, Las Vegas Lights, Monterey Bay FC – 2016–17, 2020, 2022
- **Jimmy Farkarlun** – **El Paso Locomotive** – 2026–
- Gabe Gissie – Sacramento Republic, Bethlehem Steel – 2014–17
- DZ Harmon – Charleston Battery – 2021–22
- Joel Johnson – Charlotte Independence, Hartford Athletic – 2016–22
- Mohammed Kamara – LA Galaxy II – 2019
- **Joseph Melto Quiah** – **New Mexico United** – 2026–
- Prince Saydee – Miami FC, Phoenix Rising, Hartford Athletic, Rhode Island FC, Charleston Battery – 2020–24
- **Brem Soumaoro** – Indy Eleven, **Sporting Club Jacksonville** – 2024–
- Patrick Weah – Sacramento Republic – 2021
- **Peter Wilson** – **Oakland Roots** – 2025–

=== Libya ===
- Éamon Zayed – Charlotte Independence – 2018

=== Malawi ===
- Yamikani Chester – North Carolina FC, Las Vegas Lights – 2019–20
- **Mayele Malango** – Monterey Bay FC, **Sacramento Republic** – 2025–

=== Mali ===
- Oumar Ballo – Swope Park Rangers – 2016–17
- Mamadou Kansaye – Charlotte Independence – 2015
- Ladji Mallé – Las Vegas Lights – 2022
- Zoumana Simpara – New York Red Bulls II – 2016
- Aboubacar Sissoko – Indy Eleven – 2021

=== Mauritius ===
- Ashley Nazira – San Diego Loyal – 2020

=== Morocco ===
- Ayyoub Allach – Swope Park Rangers – 2019
- Hassan Aqboub – Loudoun United – 2022
- Younes Boudadi – Reno 1868, Hartford Athletic, Indy Eleven, Las Vegas Lights – 2020–25
- Youssef Naciri – Harrisburg City Islanders – 2016

=== Mozambique ===
- Clésio Baúque – Harrisburg City Islanders – 2014

=== Niger ===
- Kairou Amoustapha – Loudoun United – 2020–21

=== Nigeria ===
- **Michael Adedokun** – Lexington SC, **Hartford Athletic** – 2025–
- Temi Adesodun – Charleston Battery – 2020–21
- Fanendo Adi – FC Cincinnati – 2018
- **Bolu Akinyode** – New York Red Bulls II, Bethlehem Steel, Nashville SC, Birmingham Legion, Miami FC, El Paso Locomotive, **Loudoun United** – 2015–16, 2018–
- Raphael Ayagwa – FC Tulsa – 2020–21
- Bright Dike – Los Angeles Blues – 2012
- David Egbo – Phoenix Rising, Memphis 901 – 2021–22
- **Chisom Egbuchulam** – **Detroit City** – 2026–
- Monday Etim – Orange County SC, Rio Grande Valley FC Toros – 2017–18
- Akinjide Idowu – Portland Timbers 2 – 2016
- Victor Igbekoyi – North Carolina FC – 2018–19
- Solomon Kwambe – FC Tulsa – 2020–21
- Qudus Lawal – Seattle Sounders FC 2, Wilmington Hammerheads, Fresno FC, San Diego Loyal – 2015–16, 2019–20
- Zion Long – Sporting Kansas City II – 2021
- Kyrian Nwabueze – Tulsa Roughnecks – 2015
- Diba Nwegbo – Birmingham Legion – 2023–24
- Emenike Nwogu – Atlanta United 2 – 2022
- **Adewale Obalola** – **Hartford Athletic** – 2025–
- Stanley Oganbor – FC Tulsa – 2021
- Patrick Okonkwo – Charleston Battery, Atlanta United 2 – 2017–19
- Rasheed Olabiyi – Harrisburg City Islanders – 2017
- Nelson Orji – Atlanta United 2 – 2022
- Isaac Promise – Austin Bold – 2019
- Nansel Selbol – Swope Park Rangers, Orange County SC – 2016–18
- Mueng Sunday – Oklahoma City Energy – 2021
- **Abdullah Taofeek** – **Hartford Athletic** – 2026–
- **Ereku Temitayo** – **Birmingham Legion** – 2025–
- George Tor – Rochester Rhinos – 2013
- Mfon Udoh – FC Tulsa – 2020
- Ibrahim Usman – Seattle Sounders 2 – 2018
- Tobenna Uzo – Colorado Springs Switchbacks, FC Tulsa – 2017–20
- Uchenna Uzo – Phoenix Rising, Pittsburgh Riverhounds – 2016–17, 2019
- Henry Uzochukwu – Phoenix Rising – 2023

=== Rwanda ===
- **Phanuel Kavita** – Real Monarchs, Saint Louis FC, **Birmingham Legion** – 2015–16, 2018–
- **Jojea Kwizera** – **Rhode Island FC** – 2024–
- Abdul Rwatubyaye – Swope Park Rangers, Colorado Springs Switchbacks – 2019–20

=== Senegal ===
- **Dominique Badji** – Charlotte Independence, **Phoenix Rising** – 2015, 2026–
- **Pape Mar Boye** – **Phoenix Rising** – 2024–
- Omar Ciss – Austin Bold – 2020–21
- Mouhamed Dabo – Harrisburg City Islanders, Pittsburgh Riverhounds, Reno 1868 – 2016–20
- Alioune Diakhate – Indy Eleven – 2019
- Oumar Diakhite – Orlando City – 2013
- Papé Diakité – Tampa Bay Rowdies – 2018–19
- Babacar Diallo – Rochester Rhinos – 2014
- **Boubacar Diallo** – **FC Tulsa** – 2024–
- Babacar Diene – Pittsburgh Riverhounds – 2024
- Mamadou Dieng – Hartford Athletic – 2024–25
- Cherif Dieye – New York Red Bulls II – 2020
- **Abdoulaye Diop** – Atlanta United 2, **Detroit City** – 2020–
- Amadou Macky Diop – Atlanta United 2, Birmingham Legion, Detroit City – 2020–22
- Clément Diop – LA Galaxy II – 2015–17
- **Hamady Diop** – Rhode Island FC, **Birmingham Legion** – 2025–
- **Ates Diouf** – Austin Bold, San Antonio FC, **Detroit City** – 2020–22, 2025–
- Mamadou Diouf – Charleston Battery – 2014
- Djiby Fall – FC Cincinnati – 2017
- Mamadou Fall – Las Vegas Lights – 2021
- Cheikh M'Baye – New York Red Bulls II – 2016
- Justin Malou – FC Tulsa, North Carolina FC – 2023–25
- Malick Mbaye – North Carolina FC – 2020
- Adama Mbengue – Orlando City – 2012–14
- Nago Mbengue – Dayton Dutch Lions – 2013
- **Bachir Ndiaye** – **Miami FC** – 2026–
- Khadime Ndiaye – Miami FC – 2024
- Alioune Ndour – Loudoun United – 2019–20
- **Babacar Niang** – **Louisville City** – 2026–
- **Cheikhou Niang** – **Detroit City** – 2026–
- Mour Samb – Ottawa Fury, Saint Louis FC – 2019–20
- Moussa Sane – Orlando City B – 2017
- **Ousmane Sylla** – **Orange County SC** – 2025–
- Abdou Mbacke Thiam – Louisville City – 2019–21
- Mohamed Thiaw – Reno 1868, Miami FC – 2018, 2020
- **Mohamed Traore** – Las Vegas Lights, Phoenix Rising, **Sporting Club Jacksonville** – 2021–
- Pape Wane – Loudoun United – 2024

=== Sierra Leone ===
- Shaka Bangura – Richmond Kickers – 2011
- Sallieu Bundu – Charlotte Eagles, Charleston Battery, VSI Tampa Bay – 2011–13
- **Frank Daroma** – Las Vegas Lights, El Paso Locomotive, **Colorado Springs Switchbacks** – 2021–22, 2025–
- Mustapha Dumbuya – Phoenix Rising, Tampa Bay Rowdies – 2019–20
- Alhaji Kamara – Richmond Kickers – 2017
- Michael Lahoud – FC Cincinnati, San Antonio FC – 2018–19
- Rodney Michael – Indy Eleven – 2022
- **Emmanuel Samadia** – **Hartford Athletic** – 2024–
- Suleiman Samura – Fresno FC, San Diego Loyal – 2019–20
- Lamin Suma – Sacramento Republic – 2017
- Joseph Toby – Arizona United – 2014
- Nate Tongovula – Seattle Sounders FC 2 – 2015
- Mohamed Buya Turay – Birmingham Legion – 2024
- **Augustine Williams** – Portland Timbers 2, LA Galaxy II, San Diego Loyal, Charleston Battery, Indy Eleven, Pittsburgh Riverhounds, **Hartford Athletic** – 2016–
- Kevin Wright – Oakland Roots – 2023

=== Somalia ===
- Haji Abdikadir – San Diego Loyal – 2021
- Siad Haji – Reno 1868, FC Tulsa – 2019–20, 2023
- **Handwalla Bwana** – Tacoma Defiance, Memphis 901, **Las Vegas Lights** – 2015–20, 2022, 2026–
- Abdi Mohamed – Memphis 901, New Mexico United, Oakland Roots – 2019, 2024–25
- Omar Mohamed – FC Cincinnati, Portland Timbers 2 – 2016–17
- **Mohamed Omar** – San Antonio FC, **Indy Eleven** – 2024–
- Abdi Salim – Detroit City, San Antonio FC – 2024–25

=== South Africa ===
- Stephen Armstrong – Charleston Battery – 2011
- Arthur Bosua – Charleston Battery – 2019–20
- Thabiso Khumalo – Pittsburgh Riverhounds – 2011
- George Lebese – Colorado Springs Switchbacks – 2020
- Yazeed Matthews – Detroit City – 2022–24
- Lindo Mfeka – Reno 1868, Oakland Roots – 2017–19, 2021–24
- Lebogang Moloto – Pittsburgh Riverhounds, Swope Park Rangers, Nashville SC, FC Tulsa – 2015–22
- Tumi Moshobane – San Diego Loyal, El Paso Locomotive – 2020–25
- Gregory Mulamba – Oklahoma City Energy, Austin Aztex – 2015
- Ethen Sampson – Whitecaps FC 2, New Mexico United – 2015, 2019
- Ty Shipalane – North Carolina FC – 2018
- **Darren Smith** – **Detroit City** – 2025–
- Miguel Timm – Phoenix Rising – 2016–17
- **Jamie Webber** – **FC Tulsa** – 2025–

=== South Sudan ===
- Machop Chol – Atlanta United 2, San Antonio FC – 2021–22, 2024
- Duach Jock – LA/Orange County Blues – 2013–14

=== Tanzania ===
- Abdalla Haji Shaibu – LA Galaxy II – 2019
- Ally Hamis Ng'anzi – Loudoun United – 2020
- Jackson Kasanzu – San Diego Loyal – 2022–23

=== Togo ===
- Shalom Dutey – Charlotte Independence – 2021
- Alex Harlley – Pittsburgh Riverhounds, Las Vegas Lights – 2016, 2019
- **Loïc Mesanvi** – **Indy Eleven** – 2026–
- Ayao Sossou – Rochester Rhinos – 2014
- **Walid Yacoubou** – Tulsa Roughnecks, Hartford Athletic, San Antonio FC, Memphis 901, **Miami FC** – 2019, 2021–

=== Tunisia ===
- Jasser Khmiri – San Antonio FC – 2021–22
- Anisse Saidi – Monterey Bay FC – 2026

=== Uganda ===
- **Sadat Anaku** – **Hartford Athletic** – 2026–
- Micheal Azira – Charleston Battery, Seattle Sounders FC 2, Colorado Springs Switchbacks, New Mexico United – 2012–13, 2015, 2018, 2021–22
- **Bobosi Byaruhanga** – **Oakland Roots** – 2025–
- Henry Kalungi – Richmond Kickers, Charlotte Independence – 2011–18
- **Edward Kizza** – Memphis 901, Pittsburgh Riverhounds, **Indy Eleven** – 2022–
- Azake Luboyera – Ottawa Fury – 2017–18
- **Sadam Masereka** – **Colorado Springs Switchbacks** – 2026–
- **Noble Okello** – Toronto FC II, Phoenix Rising, Indy Eleven, **Lexington SC** – 2018, 2025–
- Steven Sserwadda – New York Red Bulls II – 2021–22

=== Zambia ===
- Prosper Chiluya – Bethlehem Steel – 2018
- **Aimé Mabika** – **Rhode Island FC** – 2025–
- Mutaya Mwape – Charlotte Independence – 2018

=== Zimbabwe ===
- Joseph Kabwe – Charlotte Eagles – 2012
- Leeroy Maguraushe – San Antonio FC – 2019
- Lucky Mkosana – Harrisburg City Islanders, Louisville City, Tampa Bay Rowdies – 2012–13, 2018–23
- Joseph Ngwenya – Richmond Kickers, Pittsburgh Riverhounds – 2013–14
- Stanley Nyazamba – Richmond Kickers – 2011–13
- Schillo Tshuma – Orange County Blues, Arizona United, Portland Timbers 2, Saint Louis FC – 2014–16

== AFC ==
=== Afghanistan ===
- Adam Najem – Bethlehem Steel, Memphis 901, Tampa Bay Rowdies, New York Red Bulls II – 2017–20, 2022
- David Najem – New York Red Bulls II, Tampa Bay Rowdies, New Mexico United – 2016–21

=== Australia ===
- Panos Armenakas – Loudoun United, Phoenix Rising, Memphis 901, Oakland Roots – 2023–25
- **Giordano Colli** – **FC Tulsa** – 2025–
- Jesse Daley – Tacoma Defiance – 2018–20
- Harrison Delbridge – Sacramento Republic, Portland Timbers 2, FC Cincinnati – 2014–17
- Jamie Dimitroff – Seattle Sounders 2 – 2016–17
- **Zach Duncan** – Memphis 901, **Louisville City** – 2024–
- Albert Edward – Wilmington Hammerheads – 2014
- Luke Ivanovic – Monterey Bay FC – 2025
- **Jackson Lee** – Rhode Island FC, **Brooklyn FC** – 2024–
- **Sam McIllhatton** – **Birmingham Legion** – 2025–
- Jacob Muir – Monterey Bay FC – 2025
- Yahaya Musa – Wilmington Hammerheads – 2012, 2014
- Mitch Osmond – Indy Eleven, Oklahoma City Energy – 2019–21
- Adriano Pellegrino – Tulsa Roughnecks – 2016
- Liam Rose – El Paso Locomotive – 2022–24
- Al Hassan Toure – FC Tulsa – 2025
- Steve Whyte – Seattle Sounders 2 – 2017

=== China ===
- Tycho Collins – Memphis 901 – 2021
- Tan Long – Richmond Kickers, Orlando City, Arizona United – 2012–16

=== Guam ===
- A. J. DeLaGarza – LA Galaxy II, Rio Grande Valley FC Toros – 2015, 2018
- Mason Grimes – Tulsa Roughnecks – 2015–16
- Dallas Jaye – FC Cincinnati, Monterey Bay FC – 2016–17, 2022
- Doug Herrick – Charlotte Eagles – 2014
- Alex Lee – Richmond Kickers – 2015–18
- Shane Malcolm – Colorado Springs Switchbacks – 2017–19
- Shawn Nicklaw – Wilmington Hammerheads, Atlanta United 2 – 2013, 2018
- Erik Ustruck – Orlando City – 2011–13

=== Iran ===
- Amir Abedzadeh – Los Angeles Blues – 2011–12
- Shahryar Dastan – Los Angeles Blues – 2011
- Mohammad Mohammadi – LA/Orange County Blues – 2013–14
- Mehrshad Momeni – LA/Orange County Blues – 2011, 2013–15
- Mohammad Roknipour – LA/Orange County Blues – 2013–14
- Dariush Yazdani – Los Angeles Blues – 2012–13

=== Japan ===
- Kenny Akamatsu – New Mexico United – 2019
- Jun Marques Davidson – Charlotte Independence – 2016–17
- Tsubasa Endoh – Toronto FC II, LA Galaxy II – 2017–19, 2022
- Akira Fitzgerald – Tampa Bay Rowdies – 2017–18
- Ryo Fujii – LA Galaxy II – 2015–17
- Cy Goddard – Detroit City – 2022–23
- **Yosuke Hanya** – **Colorado Springs Switchbacks** – 2024–
- Shintaro Harada – Pittsburgh Riverhounds, Dayton Dutch Lions, Colorado Springs Switchbacks – 2011–16
- Koji Hashimoto – Orange County SC – 2018–19
- Masaki Hemmi – Sevilla FC Puerto Rico, Rochester Rhinos – 2011–12
- Kotaro Higashi – Charleston Battery – 2017–19
- Nozomi Hiroyama – Richmond Kickers – 2011–12
- Kodai Iida – Oklahoma City Energy – 2020–21
- Yudai Imura – Richmond Kickers – 2015–18
- Shinya Kadono – Loudoun United – 2019
- **Tetsuya Kadono** – **Orange County SC** – 2025–
- Kosuke Kimura – Tulsa Roughnecks, Nashville SC – 2017–19
- Daigo Kobayashi – Las Vegas Lights, Birmingham Legion – 2018–21
- Hiroki Kobayashi – Seattle Sounders FC 2 – 2015
- Ken Krolicki – Portland Timbers 2 – 2020
- Hiroki Kurimoto – Fresno FC, Colorado Springs Switchbacks, Oklahoma City Energy – 2019–21
- **Ryuga Nakamura** – **Monterey Bay FC** – 2026–
- **Taimu Okiyoshi** – Rhode Island FC, **Brooklyn FC** – 2025–
- Kota Sakurai – Toronto FC II – 2016
- Kentaro Takada – Saint Louis FC – 2015–16
- Soya Takahashi – Oakland Roots – 2021
- **Riyon Tori** – **Miami FC** – 2026–
- **Yutaro Tsukada** – **Rhode Island FC** – 2026–
- **Yu Tsukanome** – **Pittsburgh Riverhounds** – 2026–
- **Mouhamadou War** – **Orange County SC** – 2025–
- **Haruki Yamazaki** – **Detroit City** – 2025–

=== Jordan ===
- Jaime Siaj – Charlotte Independence, Oklahoma City Energy, Tampa Bay Rowdies – 2017–19

=== Laos ===
- Michael Vang – Miami FC – 2024

=== Lebanon ===
- Soony Saad – Swope Park Rangers, Indy Eleven – 2017–18

=== Malaysia ===
- **Wan Kuzain** – Saint Louis FC, Swope Park Rangers, RGV FC Toros, **Sporting JAX** – 2016, 2017–20, 2021, 2026–

=== Pakistan ===
- Kaleemullah Khan – Sacramento Republic, Tulsa Roughnecks – 2015–17

=== Palestine ===
- Nazmi Albadawi – FC Cincinnati, North Carolina FC – 2018–20
- **Ahmad Al-Qaq** – North Carolina, **Sporting JAX** – 2025–
- **Bilal Obeid** – **Detroit City** – 2025–

=== Philippines ===
- **Zico Bailey** – LA Galaxy II, San Antonio FC, **New Mexico United** – 2017, 2023–
- Michael Baldisimo – Vancouver Whitecaps 2 – 2016–17
- Javier Mariona – Oakland Roots – 2021–22
- Cole Mrowka – Colorado Springs Switchbacks – 2024–25
- Charley Pettys – Los Angeles Blues – 2013

=== Saudi Arabia ===
- Faris Abdi – Austin Bold – 2019

=== South Korea ===
- Cho Sun-hyung – Los Angeles Blues – 2012
- Kim Do-heon – Indy Eleven – 2019
- Kim Seung-ju – Orange County Blues – 2014–15
- Kim Tae-seong – Colorado Springs Switchbacks – 2016–18
- Kim Tae-woo – Colorado Springs Switchbacks – 2016
- Lee Jung-soo – Charlotte Independence – 2018
- Lim Choong-sil – Seattle Sounders FC 2 – 2015
- Park Cheun-yong – Los Angeles Blues – 2012
- Park Jung-yeong – Real Monarchs, Colorado Springs Switchbacks – 2016–17
- Son Jong-hyun – Louisville City – 2016

=== Vietnam ===
- Kyle Colonna – New Mexico United – 2023

=== Yemen ===
- **Harwan Al-Zubaidi** – **Miami FC** – 2026–

== CONCACAF ==
=== Antigua and Barbuda ===
- Kimoi Alexander – Antigua Barracuda – 2011–12
- Luke Blakely – Antigua Barracuda – 2012
- Randolph Burton – Antigua Barracuda – 2011–13
- Theo Brown – Antigua Barracuda – 2011
- Peter Byers – Antigua Barracuda, Los Angeles Blues – 2011–12
- Dave Carr – Antigua Barracuda – 2011
- Ranjae Christian – Antigua Barracuda – 2011
- Justin Cochrane – Antigua Barracuda – 2011
- Keita de Castro – Antigua Barracuda – 2011–12
- Omarie Daniel – Antigua Barracuda – 2013
- **Amir Daley** – **Birmingham Legion** – 2025–
- George Dublin – Antigua Barracuda – 2011–13
- Troy Dublin – Antigua Barracuda – 2012
- Gayson Gregory – Antigua Barracuda – 2011
- Roy Gregory – Antigua Barracuda – 2011
- Quinton Griffith – Antigua Barracuda, Charleston Battery – 2011–18
- **Dayonn Harris** – Real Monarchs, Tampa Bay Rowdies, **New Mexico United** – 2020–
- Tash Harris – Antigua Barracuda – 2011
- Ricardo Harvey – Antigua Barracuda – 2013
- Molvin James – Antigua Barracuda – 2011–13
- Lloyd Jeremy – Antigua Barracuda – 2012–13
- Eugene Kirwan – Antigua Barracuda – 2012–13
- Karanja Mack – Antigua Barracuda – 2011–13
- Dion Pereira – Atlanta United 2 – 2019
- Alex Phillip – Antigua Barracuda – 2011, 2013
- Hazeley Pyle – Antigua Barracuda – 2012–13
- Ralston Phoenix – Antigua Barracuda – 2012–13
- Lawson Robinson – Antigua Barracuda – 2011–13
- Janiel Simon – Antigua Barracuda – 2013
- Kerry Skepple – Antigua Barracuda – 2012
- Stefan Smith – Antigua Barracuda, Charlotte Eagles – 2011–13
- Jamoy Stevens – Antigua Barracuda – 2013
- Javorn Stevens – Seattle Sounders 2 – 2017
- Akeem Thomas – Antigua Barracuda – 2011–12
- Elvis Thomas – Antigua Barracuda – 2011
- Tamorley Thomas – Antigua Barracuda – 2011–13

=== Bahamas ===
- Happy Hall – Dayton Dutch Lions – 2011

=== Barbados ===
- Keasel Broome – Harrisburg City Islanders, Pittsburgh Riverhounds – 2016–17
- **Niall Reid-Stephen** – **New Mexico United** – 2026–

=== Belize ===
- Deshawon Nembhard – Charleston Battery – 2020
- Tony Rocha – Austin Aztex, Orlando City B, Saint Louis FC, Orange County SC – 2015–18, 2022
- Michael Salazar – FC Montreal, Ottawa Fury, Rio Grande Valley FC Toros, Memphis 901, LA Galaxy II, Miami FC – 2016–19, 2021–23

=== Bermuda ===
- Dante Leverock – Harrisburg City Islanders – 2015–16
- Zeiko Lewis – New York Red Bulls II, Charleston Battery, Sacramento Republic – 2017, 2019–23
- Taurean Manders – Antigua Barracuda – 2013

=== Cayman Islands ===
- **Gunnar Studenhofft** – **Phoenix Rising** – 2026–

=== Costa Rica ===
- Alejandro Aguilar – Pittsburgh Riverhounds – 2016
- Erick Cabalceta – Saint Louis FC – 2017
- Michael Calderón – Wilmington Hammerheads – 2014
- Julio Cascante – Portland Timbers 2 – 2018
- Dennis Castillo – Charlotte Independence – 2016–17
- **Kadeem Cole** – **Birmingham Legion** – 2026–
- Walter Cortés – Bethlehem Steel – 2019
- César Elizondo – San Antonio FC – 2016–18
- Daniel Espeleta – Detroit City – 2024
- Waylon Francis – Seattle Sounders 2 – 2018
- Ricky Garbanzo – Charleston Battery – 2015–17
- Dan Jackson – Colorado Springs Switchbacks – 2016–17
- Shaquille Jimenez – Portland Timbers 2 – 2017
- Ariel Lassiter – LA Galaxy II – 2015–18
- Marvin Loría – Portland Timbers 2 – 2018–19
- Roy Miller – New York Red Bulls II, Portland Timbers 2 – 2015, 2019
- Josue Monge – Bethlehem Steel – 2016–17
- Brandon Poltronieri – Arizona United – 2016
- Yostin Salinas – New York Red Bulls II – 2022
- Orlando Sinclair – Loudoun United – 2019
- Mauricio Vargas – Pittsburgh Riverhounds – 2016
- **Gino Vivi** – **Tampa Bay Rowdies** – 2026–
- Rodney Wallace – Arizona United – 2014

=== Cuba ===
- Yordany Álvarez – Orlando City – 2011, 2014
- **Raiko Arozarena** – Tampa Bay Rowdies, Las Vegas Lights, **New Mexico United** – 2021–22, 2024–
- Yeniel Bermúdez – River Plate Puerto Rico, Los Angeles Blues – 2011
- Maikel Chang – Charleston Battery, Real Monarchs – 2013–19, 2021
- Odisnel Cooper – Charleston Battery – 2013–18
- Heviel Cordovés – Charleston Battery, Richmond Kickers – 2013–18
- Jorge Corrales – FC Tulsa – 2017, 2021–23
- **Adrián Diz** – Portland Timbers 2, Colorado Springs Switchbacks, Rio Grande Valley FC Toros, FC Tulsa, Indy Eleven, **Hartford Athletic** – 2018–
- Miguel Ferrer – Charlotte Eagles – 2012–13
- Maykel Galindo – Los Angeles Blues – 2012–13
- Erlys García – LA/Orange County Blues – 2011–14
- Frank López – LA Galaxy II, San Antonio FC, Oklahoma City Energy, Sacramento Republic, Rio Grande Valley FC Toros, Miami FC, El Paso Locomotive – 2018–25
- Ariel Martínez – FC Tulsa, Miami FC, Hartford Athletic, Tampa Bay Rowdies – 2020–23
- Julio Maya – River Plate Puerto Rico – 2011
- **Denilson Milanés** – **Miami FC** – 2026–
- José Miranda – Puerto Rico United, LA/Orange County Blues – 2011–12, 2014–15
- Héctor Morales – Miami FC – 2020
- **Frank Nodarse** – Charleston Battery, Rio Grande Valley FC Toros, **Rhode Island FC** – 2021–
- Luis Paradela – Reno 1868 – 2019
- Geobel Pérez – Charleston Battery – 2021–22
- Yaikel Pérez – River Plate Puerto Rico – 2011
- **Bruno Rendón** – **Indy Eleven** – 2025–
- Daniel Luis Sáez – Rio Grande Valley FC Toros – 2022
- Darío Suárez – FC Tulsa, Detroit – 2020–23

=== Curaçao ===
- Zeus de la Paz – Oakland Roots – 2021
- **Jürgen Locadia** – Miami FC, **Tampa Bay Rowdies** – 2026–
- Jearl Margaritha – Phoenix Rising – 2024–25
- **Eloy Room** – **Miami FC** – 2026–
- Denzel Slager – Orange County Blues, LA Galaxy II – 2015–16
- Ayrton Statie – Reno 1868 – 2020

=== Dominican Republic ===
- Riki Alba – Las Vegas Lights – 2024
- **Edison Azcona** – El Paso Locomotive, **Las Vegas Lights** – 2022, 2024–
- Rafael Díaz – New York Red Bulls II, Sacramento Republic, Monterey Bay FC – 2015–22
- **Noah Dollenmayer** – **El Paso Locomotive**, San Antonio FC – 2023–
- César García – Miami FC – 2025
- Josh García – Oklahoma City Energy – 2019
- Cristian Ortiz – Tampa Bay Rowdies – 2024

=== El Salvador ===
- Juan Barahona – Sacramento Republic – 2019–20
- Marvin Baumgartner – Real Monarchs – 2015
- **Nelson Blanco** – North Carolina FC, **San Antonio FC** – 2018, 2024–
- Junior Burgos – Orange County Blues, Reno 1868, Las Vegas Lights – 2015, 2017, 2020
- Edrey Cáceres – Lexington SC – 2025
- **Eric Calvillo** – Reno 1868, Orange County SC, **El Paso Locomotive** – 2018–
- Derby Carrillo – FC New York – 2011
- Darwin Cerén – Orlando City – 2014
- Alexis Cerritos – Loudoun United, Orange County SC, Rio Grande Valley FC Toros – 2019–21
- Anibal Echeverria – Reno 1868 – 2017
- Andrés Flores – Portland Timbers 2, Rio Grande Valley FC Toros – 2019, 2021
- Jeremy Garay – Loudoun United, El Paso Locomotive – 2019–25
- Tomás Granitto – Swope Park Rangers, Portland Timbers 2, Miami FC – 2016–17, 2020
- **Andrés Hernández** – **Hartford Athletic** – 2026–
- Romilio Hernandez – Phoenix Rising, Rio Grande Valley FC Toros – 2017–19
- Jairo Henríquez – Colorado Springs Switchbacks – 2022–24
- Irvin Herrera – Saint Louis FC – 2016–17
- Juan Herrera-Perla – Las Vegas Lights – 2018
- Walmer Martinez – Hartford Athletic, Monterey Bay FC – 2021–24
- Richard Menjívar – Penn FC – 2018
- Edwin Miranda – Los Angeles Blues – 2011
- Roberto Molina – Las Vegas Lights, Indy Eleven, Miami FC, Orange County SC – 2021–25
- **Amando Moreno** – New York Red Bulls II, New Mexico United, **El Paso Locomotive** – 2018, 2020–
- Nathan Ordaz – Las Vegas Lights – 2022
- Maikon Orellana – Real Monarchs – 2015–17
- Joshua Pérez – Phoenix Rising, Miami FC, Tampa Bay Rowdies – 2018–19, 2021–24
- Steve Purdy – Orange County Blues – 2016
- Christopher Ramírez – Orange County Blues – 2015
- Danny Ríos – Las Vegas Lights, San Antonio FC – 2023–24
- **Joaquin Rivas** – Sacramento Republic, FC Tulsa, Saint Louis FC, Miami FC, **El Paso Locomotive** – 2015–
- Christian Rodriguez – Tulsa Roughnecks – 2018
- Ronald Rodríguez – FC Tulsa – 2022
- Alex Roldan – Tacoma Defiance – 2018–20
- **Alexander Romero** – **Las Vegas Lights** – 2023–
- Tomás Romero – Bethlehem Steel, Las Vegas Lights – 2018–22
- Allexon Saravia – Loudoun United – 2019–21
- **Christian Sorto** – Loudoun United, Rio Grande Valley FC Toros, Miami FC, Orange County SC, El Paso Locomotive, **San Antonio FC** – 2019–
- Bryan Tamacas – Oakland Roots – 2023–24

=== French Guiana ===
- **Thomas Vancaeyezeele** – Pittsburgh Riverhounds, San Diego Loyal, Birmingham Legion, Tampa Bay Rowdies, Hartford Athletic, **Brooklyn FC** – 2018–22, 2024–

=== Grenada ===
- Damien Barker – Phoenix Rising – 2024
- Kharlton Belmar – Portland Timbers 2, Swope Park Rangers, Nashville SC, Sacramento Republic, Colorado Springs Switchbacks – 2015–22
- Jamal Charles – Real Monarchs – 2018
- **Reice Charles-Cook** – **Indy Eleven** – 2025–
- **Jabari De Coteau** – **Colorado Springs Switchbacks** – 2026–
- Benjamin Ettienne – Charleston Battery – 2022
- Shavon John-Brown – El Paso Locomotive – 2022
- Darius Johnson – Phoenix Rising – 2024–26
- Alexander McQueen – Indy Eleven – 2022
- **A. J. Paterson** – Bethlehem Steel, Charleston Battery, **Birmingham Legion** – 2018–

=== Guadeloupe ===
- **Luther Archimède** – New York Red Bulls II, Sacramento Republic, Monterey Bay FC, **New Mexico United** – 2021–
- Ronald Zubar – New York Red Bulls II – 2015

=== Guatemala ===
- Pablo Aguilar – Rio Grande Valley FC Toros – 2018
- Moisés Hernández – San Antonio FC, Miami FC – 2018–19, 2023
- Aaron Herrera – Real Monarchs – 2018
- Darwin Lom – Hartford Athletic – 2021
- **Arquímides Ordóñez** – Loudoun United, **FC Tulsa** – 2025–
- Jefrey Payeras – Orange County Blues, LA Galaxy II – 2015–18
- Jasson Ramos Carpio – Tulsa Roughnecks – 2016
- Arian Recinos – New York Red Bulls II – 2022
- Nico Rittmeyer – Charleston Battery – 2017–20
- **Damian Rivera** – Tampa Bay Rowdies, **Phoenix Rising** – 2024–
- **Rubio Rubin** – San Diego Loyal, Charleston Battery, **El Paso Locomotive** – 2020, 2025–
- Rodrigo Saravia – Pittsburgh Riverhounds, Swope Park Rangers – 2016, 2018
- Allen Yanes – New York Red Bulls II – 2018–19

=== Guyana ===
- Brandon Beresford – Rochester Rhinos – 2016–17
- **Liam Butts** – **Loudoun United** – 2026–
- Jordan Dover – Rochester Rhinos, Pittsburgh Riverhounds – 2017–21
- **Omari Glasgow** – Loudoun United, **Monterey Bay FC** – 2025–
- Keanu Marsh-Brown – Memphis 901 – 2020
- Kayode McKinnon – Antigua Barracuda – 2011
- Walter Moore – Charlotte Eagles – 2011
- Emery Welshman – Real Monarchs, FC Cincinnati – 2015–16, 2018

=== Haiti ===
- Jean Alexandre – Orlando City – 2012–13
- Ashkanov Apollon – Sacramento Republic, Hartford Athletic – 2020–23
- Shanyder Borgelin – Philadelphia Union II – 2019–20
- Steward Ceus – Colorado Springs Switchbacks – 2018–19
- Miche-Naider Chéry – Oakland Roots – 2024
- **Ronaldo Damus** – Orange County SC, San Diego Loyal, Colorado Springs Switchbacks, **Birmingham Legion** – 2021, 2023–
- Jonel Désiré – Real Monarchs – 2017
- Sebastian Elney – New York Red Bulls II, Hartford Athletic – 2019–21
- Derrick Etienne – New York Red Bulls II – 2015–19
- Max Ferdinand – Rochester Rhinos – 2011
- Christiano François – Richmond Kickers, Rochester Rhinos, Pittsburgh Riverhounds, Ottawa Fury, Reno 1868, Miami FC, El Paso Locomotive, Rio Grande Valley FC Toros, Loudoun United – 2014, 2017–24
- Jacques Francois – San Antonio FC – 2016
- Jems Geffrard – FC Montreal, Fresno FC – 2015–16, 2019
- All Gue – Las Vegas Lights – 2024
- Alain Gustave – Sevilla FC Puerto Rico – 2011
- **Zachary Herivaux** – San Antonio FC, Birmingham Legion, Tampa Bay Rowdies, **Rhode Island FC** – 2017, 2019–
- Bitielo Jean Jacques – River Plate Puerto Rico, VSI Tampa Bay, Orlando City – 2011, 2013–14
- Andrew Jean-Baptiste – Los Angeles Blues, New York Red Bulls II – 2012, 2015
- Christopher Jean-Francois – Miami FC – 2024
- Mechack Jérôme – Orlando City, Charlotte Independence, El Paso Locomotive, Indy Eleven – 2011–12, 2015, 2019–23
- **Belmar Joseph** – **Monterey Bay FC** – 2026–
- Sébastien Joseph – Miami FC – 2024
- **Duke Lacroix** – Orange County SC, Reno 1868, Charlotte Independence, Sacramento Republic, **Colorado Springs Switchbacks** – 2017–
- James Marcelin – Antigua Barracuda – 2013
- **Garven Metusala** – **Colorado Springs Switchbacks** – 2025–
- Fredlin Mompremier – Tulsa Roughnecks, Sporting Kansas City II – 2019–20
- Woobens Pacius – Tampa Bay Rowdies – 2025
- Bony Pierre – FC New York – 2011
- **Delentz Pierre** – Real Monarchs, Colorado Springs Switchbacks, **FC Tulsa** – 2019, 2023–
- Groutchov Pierre – Oklahoma City Energy – 2021
- Nelson Pierre – FC Tulsa – 2026
- **Nikolai Pierre** – **Rhode Island FC** – 2026–
- Widner Saint-Cyr – Arizona United – 2014
- **Carl Sainté** – New Mexico United, Phoenix Rising, **El Paso Locomotive** – 2022, 2025–
- Jimmy-Shammar Sanon – FC Montreal, Ottawa Fury – 2016–18
- Sébastien Thurière – VSI Tampa Bay, Dayton Dutch Lions, Charleston Battery, San Antonio FC – 2013–16
- Max Touloute – Pittsburgh Riverhounds – 2015
- Denso Ulysse – Tacoma Defiance – 2017–19
- Kénold Versailles – Rochester Rhinos – 2011

=== Honduras ===
- Danilo Acosta – Real Monarchs, LA Galaxy II, Orange County SC – 2015–16, 2018, 2021–22
- Christian Altamirano – FC Tulsa – 2019–20
- **Luis Álvarez** – **Tampa Bay Rowdies** – 2025–
- Daniel Carter – El Paso Locomotive – 2025
- Franklin Castellanos – New York Red Bulls II – 2015
- Alessandro Castro – Atlanta United 2 – 2018–19
- Gerson Chávez – LA Galaxy II – 2021
- Carlos Contreras – Colorado Springs Switchbacks – 2015
- Wesly Decas – Atlanta United 2 – 2019
- José Escalante – Rio Grande Valley FC Toros, San Antonio FC – 2016–18
- Deybi Flores – Whitecaps FC 2 – 2015–17
- Devron García – Orlando City B – 2016
- Angelo Kelly-Rosales – Charleston Battery, Pittsburgh Riverhounds – 2018–22
- **Douglas Martínez** – New York Red Bulls II, Real Monarchs, San Diego Loyal, Sacramento Republic, Indy Eleven, **Charleston Battery** – 2017, 2019, 2021–
- **Alfredo Midence** – Lexington SC, **Sacramento Republic** – 2025–
- **Juan Carlos Obregón Jr.** – Rio Grande Valley FC Toros, Hartford Athletic, **Brooklyn FC** – 2019–22, 2026–
- Milton Palacios – San Antonio FC – 2016
- Marlon Ramírez – Charleston Battery, FC Tulsa – 2014, 2022
- Brayan Reyes – FC Tulsa – 2019–20
- Bryan Róchez – Orlando City B – 2016
- César Romero – Colorado Springs Switchbacks – 2019
- Junior Sandoval – Memphis 901, Las Vegas Lights – 2019–20
- Elder Torres – Real Monarchs – 2016

=== Jamaica ===
- Nathaniel Adamolekun – Austin Bold – 2020–21
- Jahshaun Anglin – Miami FC – 2021
- **Dwayne Atkinson** – **Rhode Island FC** – 2025–
- Akeil Barrett – Swope Park Rangers, Tulsa Roughnecks – 2016, 2019
- **Herson Barry** – **Indy Eleven** – 2026–
- Zaire Bartley – New York Red Bulls II – 2017
- Deshane Beckford – Rio Grande Valley FC Toros, Colorado Springs Switchbacks, San Antonio FC, Hartford Athletic – 2019–25
- Matthew Bell – FC Tulsa – 2024
- Cardel Benbow – Harrisburg City Islanders – 2015–17
- **Khori Bennett** – Las Vegas Lights, Sacramento Republic, **Colorado Springs Switchbacks** – 2024–
- **Brandon Bent** – **Miami FC** – 2025–
- Kieron Bernard – Orlando City – 2011–13
- Andrew Booth – Charleston Battery, Miami FC, FC Tulsa – 2022–25
- Navion Boyd – Charleston Battery – 2012, 2015
- Neco Brett – Portland Timbers 2, Pittsburgh Riverhounds, Birmingham Legion, New Mexico United, Memphis 901 – 2016–24
- Amoy Brown – Bethlehem Steel – 2016–17
- Brian Brown – Charlotte Independence, Reno 1868, New Mexico United, Oakland Roots, FC Tulsa – 2016–19, 2021–22
- Deshorn Brown – Tampa Bay Rowdies, Oklahoma City Energy, Sacramento Republic – 2017–19, 2022
- **Javain Brown** – **Lexington SC** – 2026–
- **Nico Brown** – **Birmingham Legion** – 2026–
- Cory Burke – Bethlehem Steel, Lexington SC – 2016–18, 2025
- Andrae Campbell – Wilmington Hammerheads, Orange County Blues, Ottawa Fury – 2014–17
- Sergio Campbell – Austin Aztex, Pittsburgh Riverhounds, Rochester Rhinos – 2015–17
- Dennis Chin – Orlando City, Arizona United, Pittsburgh Riverhounds – 2011–15, 2018
- Rennico Clarke – Portland Timbers 2, Swope Park Rangers, Charleston Battery – 2015–17, 2019–20
- Omar Cummings – FC Cincinnati – 2016–17
- Nicque Daley – Charleston Battery – 2019–21
- Omar Daley – Oklahoma City Energy – 2015
- Rashawn Dally – Memphis 901, Las Vegas Lights, Hartford Athletic – 2019–2023
- Martin Davis – Toronto FC II – 2015–17
- Simon Dawkins – Monterey Bay FC – 2022–23
- Joey DeZart – Tampa Bay Rowdies, Miami FC – 2024
- Richard Dixon – VSI Tampa Bay, Charlotte Eagles, Saint Louis FC, Oklahoma City Energy – 2013–18
- Kyle Duncan – New York Red Bulls II – 2019
- Shaquille Dyer – Harrisburg City Islanders – 2015
- Ashani Fairclough – Wilmington Hammerheads, Seattle Sounders FC 2, Charlotte Independence – 2014–17
- Oniel Fisher – Seattle Sounders FC 2, Detroit City – 2015–16, 2023
- Junior Flemmings – New York Red Bulls II, Tampa Bay Rowdies, Phoenix Rising, Birmingham Legion – 2016–21
- Kenardo Forbes – Rochester Rhinos, Pittsburgh Riverhounds – 2015–24
- Craig Foster – Harrisburg City Islanders – 2015–16
- **Maalique Foster** – Rio Grande Valley FC Toros, Sacramento Republic, Colorado Springs Switchbacks, Indy Eleven, **Charleston Battery** – 2019, 2021–
- Shaun Francis – Charlotte Eagles, Louisville City – 2013, 2018–19
- Kevaughn Frater – Real Monarchs, Colorado Springs Switchbacks, Phoenix Rising, New Mexico United – 2016–19, 2022
- Owayne Gordon – San Antonio FC, Oklahoma City Energy, Austin Bold – 2017–21
- Ewan Grandison – Memphis 901 – 2019
- Anthony Grant – Richmond Kickers – 2015–17
- Brenton Griffiths – Orange County Blues, Reno 1868, Miami FC – 2014–18, 2020
- Jamiel Hardware – Harrisburg City Islanders, Saint Louis FC – 2013–16
- Christopher Harvey – Antigua Barracuda – 2011
- Jayden Hibbert – Birmingham Legion – 2024
- Omar Holness – Real Monarchs, Bethlehem Steel – 2016–18
- Kenroy Howell – Pittsburgh Riverhounds – 2017
- **Maliek Howell** – Las Vegas Lights, Birmingham Legion, **New Mexico United** – 2024–
- Ramone Howell – Nashville SC – 2018–19
- Aaron Hurge – Loudoun United – 2025
- Jorginho James – Rio Grande Valley FC Toros – 2016–18
- Jason Johnson – Pittsburgh Riverhounds, San Antonio FC, Phoenix Rising, Louisville City, Austin Bold, FC Tulsa, Monterey Bay FC – 2014, 2016–22
- Dane Kelly – Charleston Battery, Swope Park Rangers, Reno 1868, Richmond Kickers, Indy Eleven, Charlotte Independence, Pittsburgh Riverhounds – 2011–22
- Kameron Lacey – San Antonio FC – 2024
- Lance Laing – FC Cincinnati, San Antonio FC – 2018–19
- **Kevon Lambert** – Phoenix Rising, San Antonio FC, **Louisville City** – 2017–
- Andre Lewis – Charleston Battery, Whitecaps FC 2, Portland Timbers 2, Colorado Springs Switchbacks, Hartford Athletic – 2014–18, 2020–23
- Damion Lowe – Seattle Sounders FC 2, Tampa Bay Rowdies, Phoenix Rising – 2015, 2017, 2020
- Jermie Dwayne Lynch – Saint Louis FC, Wilmington Hammerheads – 2015–16
- **Tyreek Magee** – **Colorado Springs Switchbacks** – 2023–
- Darren Mattocks – Phoenix Rising – 2021
- Kimarley McDonald – Antigua Barracuda – 2011
- Sean McFarlane – Colorado Springs Switchbacks, Austin Bold, Miami FC, FC Tulsa – 2017, 2019–22
- Justin McMaster – Bethlehem Steel – 2016–17
- Sheldon Parkinson – Phoenix FC – 2013
- Romeo Parkes – Pittsburgh Riverhounds, New Mexico United, Miami FC – 2016–18, 2020, 2022
- Christopher Pearson – FC Tulsa, Las Vegas Lights – 2022–23, 2025
- Demar Phillips – Real Monarchs, Austin Bold – 2017, 2019
- Alvas Powell – Sacramento Republic – 2014
- Akeem Priestley – Los Angeles Blues, Dayton Dutch Lions – 2011–12
- Rohan Reid – Charlotte Eagles – 2013
- Trayvone Reid – Oakland Roots – 2023–24
- Saeed Robinson – Colorado Springs Switchbacks, El Paso Locomotive – 2015–16, 2018–20
- Toric Robinson – Dayton Dutch Lions, Antigua Barracuda – 2012–13
- Asani Samuels – Rochester Rhinos – 2015–16
- **Jordan Scarlett** – New York Red Bulls II, Tampa Bay Rowdies, Louisville City, **Hartford Athletic** – 2017–
- **Tarik Scott** – Monterey Bay FC, **Lexington SC** – 2025–
- Michael Seaton – Richmond Kickers, Portland Timbers 2, Orange County SC – 2013–15, 2018–19
- Don Smart – FC New York, Fresno FC – 2011, 2018
- Dawyne Smith – Pittsburgh Riverhounds – 2012
- Rojay Smith – Sporting Kansas City II – 2021
- Newton Sterling – Antigua Barracuda – 2011
- Demar Stewart – Orlando City – 2011
- Evan Taylor – Charleston Battery – 2011
- Jermaine Taylor – Austin Bold – 2019–21
- Ryan Thompson – Pittsburgh Riverhounds, Saint Louis FC – 2015–16
- Jamoi Topey – Philadelphia Union II – 2019–20
- **Peter-Lee Vassell** – Phoenix Rising, Indy Eleven, Hartford Athletic, **Birmingham Legion** – 2019, 2021–22, 2025–
- **Jahmali Waite** – Pittsburgh Riverhounds, El Paso Locomotive, **Tampa Bay Rowdies** – 2022–
- Amani Walker – Orange County Blues – 2015
- Lamar Walker – Miami FC – 2021–22
- Chevaughn Walsh – Pittsburgh Riverhounds – 2016–17
- Jason Watson – Wilmington Hammerheads – 2014
- Je-Vaughn Watson – Charlotte Independence, Oklahoma City Energy, Austin Bold – 2018–20
- Mitchily Waul – Charlotte Eagles – 2013
- Blake White – Atlanta United 2 – 2018
- **Devon Williams** – New York Red Bulls II, Louisville City, Miami FC, **Colorado Springs Switchbacks**, Lexington SC – 2015–
- Dino Williams – Charleston Battery – 2012
- Duhaney Williams – LA Galaxy II – 2022
- **Romario Williams** – FC Montreal, Charleston Battery, Atlanta United 2, Miami FC, New Mexico United, Colorado Springs Switchbacks, Hartford Athletic, Indy Eleven, **Birmingham Legion** – 2015–20, 2022–
- Chavany Willis – Bethlehem Steel – 2019
- Paul Wilson – Harrisburg City Islanders – 2016–17
- O'Brian Woodbine – Charleston Battery – 2015–19

=== Martinique ===
- **Patrick Burner** – North Carolina FC, **Colorado Springs Switchbacks** – 2025–
- Jordy Delem – Seattle Sounders FC 2, San Antonio FC – 2016–19, 2022

=== Mexico ===
- **Diego Abitia** – **El Paso Locomotive** – 2026–
- Miguel Aguilar – Richmond Kickers, LA Galaxy II – 2015–18
- **Tony Alfaro** – Seattle Sounders FC 2, Reno 1868, **El Paso Locomotive** – 2016–18, 2020, 2024–
- Julián Araujo – LA Galaxy II – 2018
- Rafael Baca – Monterey Bay FC, Oakland Roots – 2023–24
- Xavier Báez – Austin Bold – 2019–21
- **Fidel Barajas** – Charleston Battery, **Monterey Bay FC** – 2022–23, 2026–
- Iván Becerra – Wilmington Hammerheads – 2011
- **Michelle Benítez** – **Sacramento Republic** – 2025–
- Sal Bernal – Toronto FC II – 2015–16
- Ricardo Bocanegra – Charlotte Independence – 2019
- Éder Borelli – El Paso Locomotive – 2020–24
- Pato Botello Faz – Detroit City, Las Vegas Lights – 2022–23
- Omar Bravo – Phoenix Rising – 2017
- Jesús Brígido – San Antonio FC – 2024
- José Carrera – Las Vegas Lights – 2020
- Diego Casillas – Fresno FC, Reno 1868 – 2019–20
- Javier Castro – Oklahoma City Energy – 2014
- Jürgen Damm – Oakland Roots – 2025
- Oscar Dautt – Los Angeles Blues – 2011
- Dan Delgado – Oklahoma City Energy – 2014–15
- **Fernando Delgado** – Real Monarchs, Birmingham Legion, **Monterey Bay FC** – 2021, 2024–
- Jonathan de León – Los Angeles Blues – 2011
- Isaác Díaz – Las Vegas Lights, Tulsa Roughnecks – 2018
- Bruce El-mesmari – Las Vegas Lights – 2021–22
- Jorge Escamilla – Fresno FC – 2019
- Amaury Escoto – El Paso Locomotive – 2024
- Luis Espino – Sacramento Republic – 2017–18
- **Cristóbal Fernández** – **El Paso Locomotive** – 2026–
- Lalo Fernández – Phoenix FC, Real Monarchs – 2013, 2015–17
- Ricardo Ferriño – Las Vegas Lights – 2018
- Benjamín Galindo – Reno 1868 – 2019
- Miguel Gallardo – Orlando City – 2011–14
- Emilio García – Rio Grande Valley FC Toros – 2016–17
- Juan Carlos García – Las Vegas Lights – 2018
- Miguel Garduño – Las Vegas Lights, Loudoun United – 2018–19
- Aarón Gómez – El Paso Locomotive – 2019–23
- **Diego Gómez** – **Phoenix Rising** – 2026–
- Diego Gomez-Ochoa – Loudoun United – 2021
- Adrián González – LA Galaxy II – 2020–22
- Fernando González – Colorado Springs Switchbacks – 2019
- Gabriel Gonzalez – LA/Orange County Blues, Sacramento Republic – 2013–15
- Miguel González – Colorado Springs Switchbacks, Oklahoma City Energy, Miami FC – 2015–18, 2020
- **Aarón Guillén** – Tulsa Roughnecks, North Carolina FC, Tampa Bay Rowdies, **Las Vegas Lights** – 2017–
- Iván Gutiérrez – LA Galaxy II, Phoenix Rising, Orange County SC – 2019–22
- Carlos Guzmán – San Diego Loyal, Monterey Bay FC – 2023–25
- Éver Guzmán – San Antonio FC, Hartford Athletic – 2017–20
- Octavio Guzmán – Sacramento Republic, Saint Louis FC – 2014–17
- Daniel Guzmán Jr. – Las Vegas Lights – 2018
- Adolfo Hernández – Rio Grande Valley FC Toros – 2022
- Cristhian Hernández – Harrisburg City Islanders, Las Vegas Lights – 2013–14, 2019
- **Jorge Hernández** – LA Galaxy II, **San Antonio FC** – 2017–2021, 2023–
- José Hernández – Real Monarchs, LA Galaxy II, Oklahoma City Energy, Oakland Roots, Phoenix Rising – 2015, 2017–24
- **Carlos Herrera** – Monterey Bay FC, **Detroit City** – 2022–
- **Christian Herrera** – Swope Park Rangers, Tacoma Defiance, **Colorado Springs Switchbacks** – 2018, 2020–
- Duilio Herrera – Rio Grande Valley FC Toros – 2022–23
- Joel Huiqui – Las Vegas Lights – 2018
- Rodrigo Íñigo – Las Vegas Lights – 2018
- Alonso Jiménez – Charlotte Eagles – 2013
- Kichi – Los Angeles Blues – 2013
- Edwin Lara – San Diego Loyal – 2020
- Jesús Leal – Real Monarchs – 2016–17
- Richard Ledezma – Real Monarchs – 2018
- Tony Leone – Las Vegas Lights – 2021–22
- **Jonathan Levin** – Tulsa Roughnecks, Las Vegas Lights FC, Phoenix Rising, **Miami FC** – 2017–22, 2026–
- Rubén Luna – Rio Grande Valley FC Toros – 2016–17
- Uvaldo Luna – Colorado Springs Switchbacks – 2020
- Manuel Madrid – Phoenix Rising – 2021–22
- Ramón Martín del Campo – Ottawa Fury, Fresno FC, Las Vegas Lights, Oklahoma City Energy, Miami FC – 2017–21
- Luis Martínez – Oklahoma City Energy – 2016–17
- Raúl Mendiola – LA Galaxy II, Las Vegas Lights, Reno 1868, San Diego Loyal – 2014–20
- Kevin Mendoza – Tampa Bay Rowdies – 2020
- Carlos Merancio – Hartford Athletic, Rio Grande Valley FC Toros – 2021, 2023
- Víctor Milke – FC Tulsa – 2021
- Leopoldo Morales – Los Angeles Blues – 2013
- Francisco Nevárez – El Paso Locomotive – 2024
- David Ochoa – Real Monarchs – 2018–20
- Jaziel Orozco – Real Monarchs – 2021
- **Arturo Ortiz** – **El Paso Locomotive** – 2024–
- Cristian Ortíz – Austin Bold – 2020
- Viggo Ortiz – Charleston Battery – 2025
- Edson Partida – El Paso Locomotive – 2019
- Ramón Pasquel – El Paso Locomotive – 2024
- **Adrian Pelayo** – North Carolina FC, **Phoenix Rising** – 2024, 2026–
- Jonathan Perez – LA Galaxy II – 2020–22
- Ricardo Pérez – Colorado Springs Switchbacks, Charlotte Independence – 2017–18
- Erik Pimentel – Rio Grande Valley FC Toros – 2021–23
- Julian Portugal – Tulsa Roughnecks, Las Vegas Lights – 2015, 2018
- Aldo Quintanilla – Rio Grande Valley FC Toros, Austin Bold – 2018, 2020–21
- José Ramos – Phoenix FC, Arizona United – 2013–14
- Daniel Ríos – North Carolina FC, Nashville SC – 2018–19
- Sergio Rivas – Reno 1868, New Mexico United, Sacramento Republic – 2019–26
- Herbert Robinson García – Tacoma Defiance – 2019
- **Arturo Rodríguez** – Real Monarchs, Phoenix Rising, **Charleston Battery** – 2020–
- Carlos Rodriguez – Sacramento Republic – 2016–18
- Diego Rodríguez – Charleston Battery – 2025
- Emiliano Rodríguez – El Paso Locomotive – 2024–25
- **Abraham Romero** – LA Galaxy II, Orange County SC, Las Vegas Lights, Colorado Springs Switchbacks, **El Paso Locomotive** – 2019–22, 2025–
- Jesús Rubio – Tacoma Defiance, Colorado Springs Switchbacks – 2019–20
- Miguel Salazar – San Antonio FC – 2016–17
- **Carlos Saldaña** – Sacramento Republic, **Detroit City** – 2021–
- Chuy Sanchez – Oklahoma City Energy – 2015
- **Richard Sánchez** – Sporting Kansas City II, LA Galaxy II, Hartford Athletic, Memphis 901, **San Antonio FC** – 2020, 2022–
- Pablo Sisniega – San Antonio FC – 2024
- Christian Torres – Las Vegas Lights – 2018–19
- **Christian Torres** – Las Vegas Lights, **Loudoun United** – 2021–22, 2026–
- Erick Torres – Orange County SC, Las Vegas Lights – 2022–23
- Danny Trejo – Las Vegas Lights – 2021–22
- Iván Valencia – Reno 1868 – 2019
- Obed Vargas – Tacoma Defiance – 2021
- Julián Vázquez – Real Monarchs, Las Vegas Lights – 2019–21
- Jonantan Villal – Atlanta United 2 – 2021–22
- Sergio Villaseñor – Charlotte Eagles – 2013
- Salomón Wbias – Orange County SC – 2017

=== Montserrat ===
- **Nico Gordon** – **Monterey Bay FC** – 2025–

=== Nicaragua ===
- Lester Meléndez – Puerto Rico United – 2011
- **Jacob Montes** – Portland Timbers 2, **Monterey Bay FC** – 2017, 2026–

=== Panama ===
- Ricardo Ávila – Real Monarchs – 2019–20
- Jiro Barriga Toyama – Monterey Bay FC – 2022
- Guillermo Benítez – Atlanta United 2 – 2019
- Christopher Cragwell – New York Red Bulls II – 2022
- Saed Díaz – Philadelphia Union II – 2019–20
- Fidel Escobar – New York Red Bulls II – 2017–18
- Carlos Harvey – LA Galaxy II, Phoenix Rising – 2019–23
- Cristian Martínez – Pittsburgh Riverhounds, FC Cincinnati, Las Vegas Lights – 2016–17, 2019
- Michael Amir Murillo – New York Red Bulls II – 2017
- Francisco Narbón – FC Cincinnati, Seattle Sounders 2 – 2016–18
- Luis Pereira – Toronto FC II – 2017
- Romario Piggott – Charleston Battery – 2019–22
- Carlos Small – Rio Grande Valley FC Toros – 2018–19
- Tony Taylor – Ottawa Fury, San Antonio FC – 2018–19
- **Juan Tejada** – Tampa Bay Rowdies, Indy Eleven, **Colorado Springs Switchbacks** – 2019–
- Román Torres – Tacoma Defiance – 2019
- Omar Valencia – New York Red Bulls II – 2022
- Ernesto Walker – LA Galaxy II – 2019

=== Puerto Rico ===
- Isaac Angking – Charlotte Independence, Rhode Island FC – 2019, 2024–25
- Shawn Barry – Real Monarchs, Tampa Bay Rowdies – 2018–19
- Andrés Cabrero – Puerto Rico United – 2011
- **Nicolás Cardona** – Hartford Athletic, Miami FC, **El Paso Locomotive** – 2021, 2024–
- Alec Díaz – Tacoma Defiance – 2018–21
- **Gerald Díaz** – **Miami FC** – 2025–
- **Steven Echevarria** – New York Red Bulls II, **Colorado Springs Switchbacks** – 2018, 2021–
- Raúl González – Richmond Kickers, Memphis 901 – 2017–18, 2020–21
- Jeremy Hall – Wilmington Hammerheads, Sacramento Republic – 2014, 2016–18
- Jason Hernandez – Toronto FC II – 2017–18
- Scott Jones – Charlotte Eagles – 2012
- Cody Laurendi – LA Galaxy II, Austin Aztex, Oklahoma City Energy – 2014–20
- Eloy Matos – River Plate Puerto Rico – 2011
- Chris Megaloudis – River Plate Puerto Rico, FC New York – 2011
- Joan Morales – Sevilla FC Puerto Rico – 2011
- Isaac Nieves – Sevilla FC Puerto Rico – 2011
- Antonio Pacheco – Sevilla FC Puerto Rico – 2011
- Héctor Ramos – Puerto Rico United – 2011
- Jorge Rivera – Penn FC – 2018
- Ricardo Rivera – Miami FC – 2025
- Wilfredo Rivera – Indy Eleven – 2022
- Manolo Sánchez – New York Red Bulls II, San Antonio FC, Harrisburg City Islanders – 2015–17
- Matthew Sánchez – Rio Grande Valley FC Toros – 2018
- **Jaden Servania** – Birmingham Legion, North Carolina FC, **Brooklyn FC** – 2020–21, 2024–
- Anthony Vázquez – Pittsburgh Riverhounds – 2013
- Devin Vega – San Antonio FC, Phoenix Rising, Real Monarchs – 2017–20
- Elliot Vélez – Sevilla FC Puerto Rico – 2011
- Petter Villegas – River Plate Puerto Rico – 2011
- **Beto Ydrach** – **Pittsburgh Riverhounds** – 2025–

=== Saint Kitts and Nevis ===
- Irandy Byron – Antigua Barracuda – 2013
- Tishan Hanley – Richmond Kickers – 2014
- Atiba Harris – Oklahoma City Energy – 2018–20
- Orlando Mitchum – Antigua Barracuda – 2011–13
- **Raheem Somersall** – North Carolina FC, FC Tulsa, **Sporting Club Jacksonville** – 2024–

=== Saint Lucia ===
- Cowin Mathurin – Antigua Barracuda – 2011

=== Saint Vincent and the Grenadines ===
- **Oalex Anderson** – Seattle Sounders FC 2, North Carolina FC, **Las Vegas Lights** – 2015–16, 2024–
- **Kyle Edwards** – Rio Grande Valley FC Toros, Hartford Athletic, **Sacramento Republic** – 2020–21, 2023–
- Myron Samuel – Seattle Sounders FC 2 – 2015–16

=== Suriname ===
- Joey Roggeveen – FC Tulsa – 2024

=== Trinidad and Tobago ===
- Aikim Andrews – Toronto FC II – 2017–18
- **Leland Archer** – Charleston Battery, **Tampa Bay Rowdies** – 2018–
- Uriah Bentick – Wilmington Hammerheads, Richmond Kickers – 2013, 2015
- Trevin Caesar – Austin Aztex, Orange County Blues, Sacramento Republic – 2015–17
- Cordell Cato – Charlotte Independence, Oklahoma City Energy – 2018–20
- Andrew De Gannes – Atlanta United 2 – 2022
- Justin Fojo – Orlando City – 2011
- Ajani Fortune – Atlanta United 2 – 2020–22
- Andre Fortune II – Rochester Rhinos, North Carolina FC, Memphis 901, Las Vegas Lights – 2016, 2018–21, 2024
- Kevan George – Dayton Dutch Lions, Charlotte Independence – 2014, 2018–20
- Shannon Gomez – Pittsburgh Riverhounds, Sacramento Republic, San Antonio FC – 2017–25
- **Jacob Greene** – Loudoun United, **Lexington SC** – 2019–23, 2025–
- Ataullah Guerra – Charleston Battery – 2016–19
- **Neveal Hackshaw** – Charleston Battery, Indy Eleven, **Oakland Roots** – 2016–
- Kobi Henry – Orange County SC – 2020–22
- **Anthony Herbert** – New Mexico United, Las Vegas Lights, **Indy Eleven** – 2024–
- Triston Hodge – Toronto FC II, Memphis 901, Colorado Springs Switchbacks, Hartford Athletic, North Carolina FC – 2016, 2019–25
- Quame Holder – FC New York – 2011
- Thorne Holder – FC New York – 2011
- Justin Hoyte – FC Cincinnati – 2017–18
- Jamal Jack – Pittsburgh Riverhounds, Colorado Springs Switchbacks – 2017–19
- Kendall Jagdeosingh – Rochester Rhinos – 2011
- Ricardo John – Toronto FC II – 2016–17
- Alvin Jones – Oklahoma City Energy, Real Monarchs – 2019–20
- Devorn Jorsling – Orlando City – 2011
- Nathan Lewis – Indy Eleven – 2018
- Yohance Marshall – Rochester Rhinos – 2011
- Kierron Mason – Charleston Battery – 2019–20
- Carlyle Mitchell – Indy Eleven – 2018
- Roald Mitchell – New York Red Bulls II – 2021
- Kevin Molino – Orlando City – 2011–14
- Duane Muckette – Memphis 901 – 2019–20
- Leston Paul – Memphis 901 – 2019–24
- Jelani Peters – Toronto FC II, Pittsburgh Riverhounds, Memphis 901 – 2017–18, 2021–23
- Noah Powder – New York Red Bulls II, Orange County SC, Real Monarchs, Indy Eleven, FC Tulsa – 2016–22
- Greg Ranjitsingh – Louisville City – 2015–18
- Darryl Roberts – Charlotte Eagles – 2012
- Kareem Smith – Colorado Springs Switchbacks – 2015
- Ryan Telfer – Miami FC – 2023
- Darren Toby – Charlotte Eagles, VSI Tampa Bay – 2011–14
- Bradley Welch – FC New York – 2011
- Jesse Williams – Pittsburgh Riverhounds – 2022
- Mekeil Williams – Richmond Kickers, Oklahoma City Energy, Pittsburgh Riverhounds – 2018–19, 2021–22
- Rundell Winchester – Portland Timbers 2 – 2015

=== Turks and Caicos Islands ===
- Billy Forbes – San Antonio FC, Phoenix Rising, Austin Bold, Miami FC, Detroit City – 2017–22

== OFC ==
=== Fiji ===
- Nicholas Prasad – Tulsa Roughnecks – 2019

=== New Zealand ===
- **Kyle Adams** – Rio Grande Valley FC Toros, Real Monarchs, San Diego Loyal, **Louisville City** – 2018–
- Hunter Ashworth – Pittsburgh Riverhounds, San Diego Loyal – 2020–21
- Myer Bevan – Whitecaps FC 2, Fresno FC – 2017–18
- **Riley Bidois** – Loudoun United, **Monterey Bay FC** – 2024–
- Noah Billingsley – Las Vegas Lights, Phoenix Rising – 2020–21
- Nikko Boxall – San Diego Loyal – 2022
- Jackson Brady – Memphis 901 – 2022
- Sam Brotherton – North Carolina FC – 2019–20
- Cory Brown – Fresno FC – 2018
- Elliot Collier – Indy Eleven, Memphis 901, San Antonio FC, San Diego Loyal – 2018–19, 2022–25
- Kip Colvey – Sacramento Republic, Reno 1868, Colorado Springs Switchbacks – 2016–18
- Moses Dyer – FC Tulsa – 2023
- Jake Gleeson – Sacramento Republic, Portland Timbers 2 – 2014–15
- **Alex Greive** – **San Antonio FC** – 2025–
- Max Mata – Real Monarchs – 2021
- James Musa – Saint Louis FC, Swope Park Rangers, Phoenix Rising, Colorado Springs Switchbacks, Indy Eleven – 2015–19, 2021–25
- Monty Patterson – Oklahoma City Energy – 2018
- Tim Payne – Portland Timbers 2 – 2015
- Cole Peverley – Charleston Battery – 2011
- Oscar Ramsay – Charlotte Independence – 2020
- Jesse Randall – Charleston Battery – 2023
- Shay Spitz – Los Angeles Blues, Richmond Kickers – 2012–14
- Bill Tuiloma – Portland Timbers 2 – 2017—19
- Deklan Wynne – Whitecaps FC 2, Oklahoma City Energy, Detroit City, Charleston Battery – 2015–17, 2021–23
- Trevor Zwetsloot – Pittsburgh Riverhounds, Loudoun United – 2023–24

== Notes ==
1. Born in Australia
2. Born in Belgium
3. Born in Brazil
4. Born in Canada
5. Born in the Democratic Republic of the Congo
6. Born in Ecuador
7. Born in England
8. Born in Ethiopia
9. Born in France
10. Born in Germany
11. Born in Guinea
12. Born in Hong Kong
13. Born in Ivory Coast
14. Born in Jamaica
15. Born in Japan
16. Born in Kenya
17. Born in Liberia
18. Born in Malawi
19. Born in the Netherlands
20. Born in Nigeria
21. Born in Norway
22. Born in the Republic of Ireland
23. Born in Saudi Arabia
24. Born in Senegal
25. Born in Slovenia
26. Born in South Africa
27. Born in Spain
28. Born in Suriname
29. Born in Sweden
30. Born in Switzerland
31. Born in Tanzania
32. Born in the United States
33. Born in Zambia
34. Capped for the Burkina Faso national football team
35. Capped for the Canada men's national under-17 soccer team
36. Capped for the Canada men's national under-18 soccer team
37. Capped for the Canada men's national under-20 soccer team
38. Capped for the Canada men's national under-21 soccer team
39. Capped for the Canada men's national under-23 soccer team
40. Capped for the Canada men's national soccer team
41. Capped for the Costa Rica national under-23 football team
42. Capped for the El Salvador men's national under-20 soccer team
43. Capped for the England national football C team
44. Capped for the England national under-16 football team
45. Capped for the England national under-17 football team
46. Capped for the England national under-19 football team
47. Capped for the England national under-20 football team
48. Capped for the England national under-21 football team
49. Capped for the France national under-16 football team
50. Capped for the France national under-17 football team
51. Capped for the France national under-18 football team
52. Capped for the France national under-19 football team
53. Capped for the France national under-20 football team
54. Capped for the France national under-21 football team
55. Capped for the Galicia national football team
56. Capped for the Greece national under-17 football team
57. Capped for the Netherlands national under-15 football team
58. Capped for the Netherlands national under-16 football team
59. Capped for the Netherlands national under-17 football team
60. Capped for the Netherlands national under-18 football team
61. Capped for the Netherlands national under-19 football team
62. Capped for the Netherlands national under-20 football team
63. Capped for the Netherlands national under-21 football team
64. Capped for the Portugal national under-20 football team
65. Capped for the Republic of Ireland national under-21 football team
66. Capped for the Scotland national under-17 football team
67. Capped for the Spain national under-17 football team
68. Capped for the Sweden men's national football team
69. Capped for the Sweden men's national under-19 football team
70. Capped for the Sweden men's national under-21 football team
71. Capped for the United States men's national soccer team
72. Capped for the United States boys' national under-15 soccer team
73. Capped for the United States men's national under-16 soccer team
74. Capped for the United States men's national under-17 soccer team
75. Capped for the United States men's national under-18 soccer team
76. Capped for the United States men's national under-19 soccer team
77. Capped for the United States men's national under-20 soccer team
78. Capped for the United States men's national under-23 soccer team
79. Capped for the Wales national under-21 football team
80. Capped for the Zanzibar national football team
