= Cowin Mathurin =

Saint Lucian footballer

Personal information
- Full name: Cowin Mathurin
- Date of birth: June 8, 1983 (age 43)
- Place of birth: Saint Lucia
- Position: Midfielder

Team information
- Current team: Antigua Barracuda FC
- Number: 24

Senior career*
Years	Team	Apps	(Gls)
2009–2010	Goldsmitty		
2010–2011	Parham		
2011–	Antigua Barracuda FC	10	(0)
- * Club domestic league appearances and goals as of September 16, 2011

Cowin Mathurin (born June 8, 1983) is a Saint Lucian footballer who currently plays for Antigua Barracuda FC in the USL Professional Division.

== Club career ==
Mathurin played for Goldsmitty in the Antigua and Barbuda Premier Division in 2009/10, and was his team's top scorer, before controversially signing for league rivals Parham prior to the 2010/11 season.

In 2011 Mathurin transferred to the new Antigua Barracuda FC team prior to its first season in the USL Professional Division. He made his debut for the Barracudas on April 17, 2011 in the team's first ever competitive game, a 2–1 loss to the Los Angeles Blues.
