= Fabrice Mbvouvouma =

Cameroonian footballer

Personal information
- Date of birth: 21 July 1997 (age 29)
- Place of birth: Mbalmayo, Cameroon
- Height: 1.70 m (5 ft 7 in)
- Position: Midfielder

Youth career
- –2014: Rainbow Bamenda

Senior career*
Years	Team	Apps	(Gls)
2015–2016	FC Montreal	7	(0)

International career^{‡}
	Cameroon U17	5	(2)
	Cameroon U20	2	(0)
- * Club domestic league appearances and goals as of 20 June 2016 ‡ National team caps and goals as of 26 March 2016

Fabrice Mbvouvouma (born 21 July 1997) is a Cameroonian professional footballer who most recently played as a midfielder for FC Montreal in the United Soccer League.

== Career ==
Born in Mbalmayo, Cameroon, Mbvouvouma started his career with Rainbow Football Club in Cameroon before signing with Canadian soccer side, FC Montreal, on 28 August 2015. He made his professional debut for the side on 5 September 2015 against Toronto FC II. He came on as a 63rd-minute substitute as FC Montreal lost 3–2.

== International ==
Mbvouvouma has represented Cameroon at the under-17 and under-20 levels.

== Career statistics ==
As of 20 June 2016

Club	Season	League			Domestic Cup		League Cup		Continental		Total	
Club	Season	Division	Apps	Goals	Apps	Goals	Apps	Goals	Apps	Goals	Apps	Goals
FC Montreal	2015	USL	3	0	—	—	—	—	—	—	3	0
FC Montreal	2016	USL	4	0	—	—	—	—	—	—	4	0
Career total			7	0	0	0	0	0	0	0	7	0
