= 2019 Orange County SC season =

Orange County SC
2019 season
- Owner: James Keston
- Head coach: Braeden Cloutier
- USL Championship: Western Conference: 5th
- USL Championship Playoffs: Conference Quarterfinals
- U.S. Open Cup: Second Round
- Highest home attendance: League/All: 5,122 (October 19 vs. Fresno FC)
- Lowest home attendance: League: 1,558 (April 10 vs. Tacoma); All : 400 (May 15 vs. Orange County FC (NPSL), (USOC) )
- Average home league attendance: 3,192
- Biggest win: 4–0 (April 10 vs. Tacoma)
- Biggest defeat: 2–6 (October 26 at Real Monarchs, USL Cup QF)
| Home colors | Away colors | Third colors |

The 2019 Orange County SC season was the club's ninth season of existence, and their ninth consecutive season in the United Soccer League Championship, the second tier of American soccer. Orange County were also scheduled to compete in the U.S. Open Cup.

Orange County struggled in the opening weeks, going winless through the first four weeks (0-2-2), and capturing only four wins in the first 17 games (4-6-7). Competitive success was inconsistent until a victory over Reno 1868 FC in week 21, when OCSC then went on to gather ten wins in 14 games, including a 6-game win streak. OCSC finished 5th in the Western Conference in the regular season with 54 points, two points behind Real Monarchs SLC. Orange County travelled to Zion's Bank Stadium for the first round quarterfinal playoff game and lost to the host Monarchs 2–6. In the U.S. Open Cup, Orange County were eliminated in the first round by Orange County FC losing 3–5 on penalties, failing to win a game in the competition for the fifth time in club history.

2019 marked the second season with Braeden Cloutier as the club's head coach, and the first season with former player Richard Chaplow as assistant coach. The season average of 3,192 fans per home match was the largest average in club history, and the third consecutive season that the average attendance had increased.

== Roster ==
As of June 23, 2019

| No. | Position | Nation | Player |
|---|---|---|---|
| 1 | GK | DEN | Frederik Due |
| 2 | DF | USA | Kevin Alston |
| 3 | DF | USA | Joe Amico |
| 4 | DF | BRA | Leonardo |
| 5 | DF | USA | Hugo Arellano (on loan from LA Galaxy) |
| 6 | DF | USA | Michael Orozco |
| 7 | FW | NED | Jerry van Wolfgang |
| 8 | MF | ENG | Liam Trotter |
| 9 | FW | JAM | Michael Seaton |
| 11 | FW | ENG | Harry Forrester |
| 12 | MF | USA | Daniel Crisostomo |
| 13 | FW | BRA | Vinicius |
| 14 | MF | USA | Aodhan Quinn |
| 15 | MF | USA | Sebastien Des Pres |
| 16 | FW | USA | Kevin Coleman |
| 17 | FW | USA | Darwin Jones |
| 18 | MF | USA | Connor Gordon |
| 19 | FW | USA | Giovanni Ramos-Godoy |
| 20 | MF | USA | Christian Duke |
| 21 | MF | USA | Francis Jacobs |
| 22 | MF | JPN | Koji Hashimoto |
| 23 | DF | GHA | Owusu-Ansah Kontor |
| 24 | GK | USA | Carlos López |
| 25 | GK | USA | Aaron Cervantes |
| 26 | DF | USA | Walker Hume |
| 27 | MF | USA | Edson Alvarado |
| — | MF | USA | Bryang Kayo |
| 33 | FW | USA | Diego Lopez |

=== Technical staff ===
| Role | Name |
|---|---|
| General Manager | Oliver Wyss |
| Assistant GM | Peter Nugent |
| Technical director | Frans Hoek |
| Head coach | Braeden Cloutier |
| Assistant coach | Richard Chaplow |
| Strength & Conditioning | Claudio Trabattoni |
| Asst Strength & Conditioning | Dan Sparks |
| Goalkeeping coach | Victor Nogueira |
| Team Operations | Jakob Harding |
| Athletic Trainer | Mitchell Deyhle |
| U23 Head Coach | Jerry Tamashiro |
| U23 Assistant Coach | Didier Crettenand |

== Competitions ==
=== Exhibitions ===
All times in Pacific Time

| February 5 Preseason | Orange County SC (United States) | – | (Japan) Vissel Kobe | Irvine, California |
| | | Report | | Stadium: Championship Soccer Stadium |
Note: Canceled due to inclement weather

| February 8 Preseason | Orange County SC | 1–1 | Toronto FC | Irvine, California |
| | Goal | | Goal | Stadium: University of California, Irvine |

| February 12 Preseason | Orange County SC (United States) | 5–1 | (Mexico) Club Tijuana U-20 | Irvine, California |
| | Jones 5'; Seaton 21' (pen.); Ramos-Godoy, Forrester | Report | 6' | Stadium: Championship Soccer Stadium |

| February 16 Preseason | Orange County SC | 4–0 | San Diego Toreros | Irvine, California |
| | Seaton Quinn (?) | | | Stadium: Great Park Field #18 |

| February 20 Preseason | LA Galaxy II | 1–0 | Orange County SC | Carson, California |
| | Zubak 12' | Report | | Stadium: Dignity Health Sports Park Track & Field Stadium |

| February 23 Preseason | Cal State Fullerton Titans | 0–1 | Orange County SC | Fullerton, California |
| | | | Goal | Stadium: Titan Stadium |

| February 27 Preseason | Loyola Marymount Lions | 0–6 | Orange County SC | Los Angeles, California |
| | | Report | | Stadium: Sullivan Field |

| March 2 Preseason | Las Vegas Lights FC | 2–1 | Orange County SC | Las Vegas, Nevada |
| | Parra 11', 72' | | 13' | Stadium: Cashman Field |

=== USL Championship ===
==== Standings ====
| Pos | Team | Pld | W | D | L | GF | GA | GD | Pts | Qualification |
|---|---|---|---|---|---|---|---|---|---|---|
| 3 | Fresno FC | 34 | 16 | 9 | 9 | 58 | 44 | +14 | 57 | Conference Quarterfinals |
| 4 | Real Monarchs (C) | 34 | 16 | 8 | 10 | 71 | 53 | +18 | 56 | Conference Quarterfinals |
| 5 | Orange County SC | 34 | 15 | 9 | 10 | 54 | 43 | +11 | 54 | Conference Quarterfinals |
| 6 | El Paso Locomotive FC | 34 | 13 | 11 | 10 | 42 | 36 | +6 | 50 | Conference Quarterfinals |
| 7 | Sacramento Republic | 34 | 14 | 6 | 14 | 50 | 43 | +7 | 48 | Play-In Round |

Source: USL Championship Standings
Rules for classification: 1) total wins; 2) total goal differential; 3) total goals scored; 4) points earned against top four Conference finishers; 5) disciplinary points; 6) coin toss or drawing of lots
(C) Champions

==== Results summary ====
| Overall | | | | | | | | Home | | | | | | Away | | | | | |
| Pld | W | D | L | GF | GA | GD | Pts | W | D | L | GF | GA | GD | W | D | L | GF | GA | GD |
|---|---|---|---|---|---|---|---|---|---|---|---|---|---|---|---|---|---|---|---|
| 34 | 15 | 9 | 10 | 54 | 43 | +11 | 54 | 10 | 4 | 3 | 34 | 17 | +17 | 5 | 5 | 7 | 20 | 26 | −6 |

Source: USL standings

==== Results by round ====
| Round | 1 | 2 | 3 | 4 | 5 | 6 | 7 | 8 | 9 | 10 | 11 | 12 | 13 | 14 | 15 | 16 | 17 | 18 | 19 | 20 | 21 | 22 | 23 | 24 | 25 | 26 | 27 | 28 | 29 | 30 | 31 | 32 | 33 | 34 |
|---|---|---|---|---|---|---|---|---|---|---|---|---|---|---|---|---|---|---|---|---|---|---|---|---|---|---|---|---|---|---|---|---|---|---|
| Stadium | A | H | H | A | H | H | A | A | H | A | H | A | H | A | H | H | H | A | A | H | H | H | A | H | H | A | A | H | A | A | H | A | A | H |
| Result | D | L | D | L | W | W | L | D | W | D | D | D | W | D | L | L | L | W | L | D | W | D | L | W | W | W | W | W | W | L | W | L | W | W |

Source: Orange County schedule
A = Away; H = Home; W = Win; D = Draw; L = Loss

==== Match results ====
On December 19, 2018, the USL announced their 2019 season schedule.

All times in Pacific Time

| March 9 1 | Reno 1868 FC | 2–2 | Orange County SC | Reno, Nevada |
| 1:45 PM | Casiple (yellow card) 40'; Brown 63'; Mfeka 68'; Mendiola (yellow card) 82' | Report | Adams (yellow card) 55'; Forrester (yellow card) 60'; Seaton 77'; Quinn 90+1' (pen.) | Stadium: Greater Nevada Field; Attendance: 3,024; Referee: Jon Freemon |

| March 16 2 | Orange County SC | 3–5 | Tulsa Roughnecks | Irvine, California |
| 7:00 PM | Alston 13'; Quinn 45+1' (pen.); Hume (yellow card) 45+3'; Arellano (yellow card) 71'; Ramos-Godoy 90+3' | Report | da Costa (yellow card) 29'; Altamirano (yellow card) 35', (goal) 45+4' (pen.); Silva 54'; Lobo 74', 78'; Bastidas 80' | Stadium: Championship Soccer Stadium; Attendance: 3,023; Referee: Alejandro Aguilera, Jr. |

| March 23 3 | Orange County SC | 2–2 | New Mexico United | Irvine, California |
| 7:00 PM | Jones 59'; Crisostomo (yellow card) 63'; Leonardo 90+2' | Report | Moar 14'; Frater 33', (yellow card) 58'; Guzman (yellow card) 90+1' | Stadium: Championship Soccer Stadium; Attendance: 2,320; Referee: Gustavo Solorio |

| March 30 4 | El Paso Locomotive FC | 2–0 | Orange County SC | El Paso, Texas |
| 6:30 PM | Kiffe (yellow card) 45+1'; Partida 64', 88'; Fox (yellow card) 90' | Report | Kontor (yellow card) 79'; Jones (yellow card) 89'; Leonardo (yellow card) 90+5' | Stadium: Southwest University Park; Attendance: 7,064; Referee: Elton Garcia |

| April 6 5 | Orange County SC | 2–0 | Colorado Springs Switchbacks | Irvine, California |
| 8:00 PM | Jones 42', 57'; McLain (yellow card) 83'; Adams (yellow card) 87' | Report | Yaro (yellow card) 89' | Stadium: Orange County Great Park; Attendance: 1,726; Referee: Malik Badawi |

| April 10 6 | Orange County SC | 4–0 | Tacoma Defiance | Irvine, California |
| 7:00 PM | Jones 28'; Forrester (yellow card) 50'; Leonardo 71'; Seaton 85'; Vinicius 89' | Report | | Stadium: Orange County Great Park; Attendance: 1,558; Referee: Fotis Bazakos |

| April 20 7 | OKC Energy | 1–0 | Orange County SC | Oklahoma City, Oklahoma |
| 5:30 PM | Jones 4'; Ross (yellow card) 79' | Report | Arellano (yellow card) 75' | Stadium: Taft Stadium; Attendance: 4,611; Referee: Mike Lavergne |

| April 26 8 | Fresno FC | 2–2 | Orange County SC | Fresno, California |
| 7:30 PM | del Campo (yellow card) 25'; Moses (yellow card) 75' (yellow-red card) 90+2'; Chaney 79'; Caffa 84' | Report | van Ewijk 4', (yellow card) 65'; Forrester 12'; Seaton (yellow card) 25'; Arellano (yellow card) 68'; Trotter (yellow card) 69'; Crisostomo (yellow card) 86' | Stadium: Chukchansi Park; Attendance: 4,576; Referee: Joseph Salinas |

| May 4 9 | Orange County SC | 2–1 | Phoenix Rising FC | Irvine, California |
| 7:00 PM | Quinn 28' (pen.); Alston (yellow card) 33'; Vinicius (yellow card) 48'; Seaton 57'; Forrester (yellow card) 63'; Kontor (yellow card) 69'; Jones (yellow card) 79'; McLain (yellow card) 90+3' | Report | Lambert (yellow card) 26'; Jahn (yellow card) 47', (goal) 70' | Stadium: Orange County Great Park; Attendance: 2,516; Referee: Michael Radchuk |

| May 11 10 | San Antonio FC | 0–0 | Orange County SC | San Antonio, Texas |
| 5:30 PM | Lahoud (yellow card) 17'; Hernández (yellow card) 59'; Guzmán (yellow card) 68' | Report | Seaton (yellow card) 70'; Quinn (yellow card) 72'; Forrester (yellow card) 85' | Stadium: Toyota Field; Referee: Kevin Broadley |

| May 18 11 | Orange County SC | 2–2 | Austin Bold FC | Irvine, California |
| 7:00 PM | Leonardo (yellow card) 37'; Jones 43'; Quinn 52'; Seaton (yellow card) 90+3' | Report | Lima (yellow card) 38', (goal) 43'; Troncoso 39' | Stadium: Championship Soccer Stadium; Attendance: 4,240; Referee: Kevin Stott |

| May 25 12 | LA Galaxy II | 2–2 | Orange County SC | Carson, California |
| 19:00 | Iloski 2'; López 90+2' | Report | Amico (yellow card) 10'; Quinn 50', (yellow card) 85'; Jones (yellow card) 51'; Vinicius 77', (yellow card) 88' | Stadium: Dignity Health Sports Park; Attendance: 1,068; Referee: Elton García |

| June 1 13 | Orange County SC | 2–1 | Rio Grande Valley FC Toros | Irvine, California |
| 9:00 PM | Quinn (yellow card) 4' (yellow-red card) 67'; Seaton 10', (yellow card) 77'; Jones 31', (yellow card) 32' (yellow-red card) 90+3'; Crisostomo (yellow card) 38'; Amico (yellow card) 90' | Report | Coronado 41' | Stadium: Championship Soccer Stadium; Attendance: 3,280; Referee: Ismir Pekmic |

| June 8 14 | Las Vegas Lights FC | 1–1 | Orange County SC | Las Vegas, Nevada |
| 7:30 PM | Parra 39'; Torre (yellow card) 43'; Villareal (yellow card) 76' | Report | Amico (red card) 45+1'; Seaton (yellow card) 45+4'; Leonardo 70' | Stadium: Cashman Field; Attendance: 6,801; Referee: Dejan Susak |

| June 15 15 | Phoenix Rising FC | 3–0 | Orange County SC | Scottsdale, Arizona |
| 7:30pm | Alston 6' (o.g.); Calistri 17'; Asante 50'; Mala (yellow card) 60'; Musa (yellow card) 69' | Report | Crisostomo (yellow card) 19'; Vinicius (yellow card) 37' | Stadium: Casino Arizona Field; Attendance: 6,562; Referee: Victor Rivas |

| June 22 16 | Orange County SC | 0–2 | Portland Timbers 2 | Irvine, California |
| 9:00 PM | Vinicius (yellow card) 57' | Report | Ojeda (yellow card) 46'; Miller 87'; Hurtado 90+1' | Stadium: Championship Soccer Stadium; Attendance: 3,172; Referee: Alejandro Mariscal |

| June 29 17 | Orange County SC | 1–2 | LA Galaxy II | Irvine, California |
| 19:00 | Vinicius 54'; Seaton (yellow card) 77'; Kontor (yellow card) 90+3' | Report | DePuy (yellow card) 25'; Ontiveros (yellow card) 36'; Harvey (yellow card) 40'; López 47', 86' | Stadium: Champions Soccer Stadium; Attendance: 3,702; Referee: Elijio Arreguin |

| July 4 18 | Colorado Springs Switchbacks FC | 1–2 | Orange County SC | Colorado Springs, Colorado |
| 6:00 PM | Argueta 46'; Burt (yellow card) 67' | Report | Alvarado (yellow card) 44'; Seaton 49'; Ramos-Godoy 76'; Hume (red card) 86' | Stadium: Weidner Field; Attendance: 5,606; Referee: Rosendo Mendoza |

| July 13 19 | Austin Bold FC | 3–2 | Orange County SC | Austin, Texas |
| 5:30 PM | Lima 10'; McFarlane 21', (yellow card) 22'; Soto (yellow card) 55'; Báez (yellow card) 73'; Tyrpak 90+2' | Report | Alvarado 27'; Seaton 67'; Forrester (yellow card) 76'; Cervantes (yellow card) 89' | Stadium: Bold Stadium; Attendance: 2,023; Referee: Malik Badawi |

| July 20 20 | Orange County SC | 0–0 | San Antonio FC | Irvine, California |
| 7:00 PM | Forrester (yellow card) 29'; Alston (yellow card) 67'; Leonardo (red card) 90+2' | Report | Parano (yellow card) 57'; Barmby (yellow card) 90'; Pecka (yellow card) 90+4' | Stadium: Championship Soccer Stadium; Attendance: 1,723; Referee: Lorant Varga |

| July 24 21 | Orange County SC | 4–1 | Reno 1868 FC | Irvine, California |
| 1:00 PM | Seaton 11'; Jones 36', 50'; Alvarado (yellow card) 60'; Crisostomo 90+3' | Report | Hertzog 58' (pen.) | Stadium: Championship Soccer Stadium; Attendance: 2,838; Referee: Rosendo Mendoza |

| July 27 22 | Orange County SC | 0–0 | Sacramento Republic FC | Irvine, California |
| 7:00 PM | | Report | Keinan (yellow card) 87' | Stadium: Championship Soccer Stadium; Attendance: 2,860; Referee: Sergii Demianchuk |

| August 9 23 | Tacoma Defiance | 2–1 | Orange County SC | Tacoma, Washington |
| 7:00 pm (PDT) | Hopeau 43'; Berkolds (yellow card) 45'; Vargas 52', (yellow card) 55'; Hinds (yellow card) 62' | Report | Seaton 11', (yellow card) 89'; Orozco (yellow card) 23'; Quinn (yellow card) 44'; Leonardo (yellow card) 47' | Stadium: Cheney Stadium; Referee: Kevin Broadley |

| August 17 24 | Orange County SC | 3–0 | Las Vegas Lights FC | Irvine, California |
| 7:00 PM | Amico (yellow card) 12'; Duke (yellow card) 46'; Forrester (yellow card) 56' van Ewijk 68'; Quinn 76'; Seaton 86' | Report | Sandoval (yellow card) 49' (yellow-red card) 89' | Stadium: Championship Soccer Stadium; Attendance: 3,287; Referee: Elvis Osmanovic |

| August 24 25 | Orange County SC | 3–1 | Real Monarchs | Irvine, California |
| 7:00 PM | Orozco 28'; Jones 38'; Quinn 52' van Ewijk (yellow card) 64' | Report | Jasso (yellow card) 51'; Ryden 61', (yellow card) 78'; Moberg (yellow card) 63'; Chang (yellow card) 74'; Holt (yellow card) 90+2' | Stadium: Championship Soccer Stadium; Attendance: 3,053; Referee: Farhad Dadkho |

| September 1 26 | New Mexico United | 0–2 | Orange County SC | Albuquerque, New Mexico |
| 3:00 PM | Suggs (yellow card) 46' | Report | Orozco (yellow card) 35'; Forrester (yellow card) 43' van Ewijk 52'; Seaton 55'; Quinn (yellow card) 76'; Arellano (yellow card) 81' | Stadium: Isotopes Park; Attendance: 12,873; Referee: Luis Guardia |

| September 8 27 | Portland Timbers 2 | 1–2 | Orange County SC | Portland, Oregon |
| 7:30 PM | Calixtro 60'; Diz (yellow card) 90+1' | Report | Seaton 35', (yellow card) 89'; Jones 54'; Quinn (yellow card) 73'; Hume (yellow card) 77' | Stadium: Providence Park; Referee: Malik Badawi |

| September 14 28 | Orange County SC | 2–0 | El Paso Locomotive FC | Irvine, California |
| 7:00 PM | Seaton 36'; Jones 58' | Report | Ryan (yellow card) 45'; N'Toko (yellow card) 90' | Stadium: Championship Soccer Stadium; Attendance: 3,913; Referee: Greg Dopka |

| September 21 29 | Tulsa Roughnecks | 0–1 | Orange County SC | Tulsa, Oklahoma |
| 7:00 PM CDT | Reyes (yellow card) 23'; Altamirano (yellow card) 61' | Report | Forrester (yellow card) 31'; Hume (yellow card) 82'; Quinn (yellow card) 90+1'; Coleman 90+4' | Stadium: ONEOK Field; Attendance: 1,513; Referee: Guido Gonzales, Jr. |

| September 28 30 | Rio Grande Valley FC Toros | 2–0 | Orange County SC | Edinburg, Texas |
| 5:30 PM | Lemoine (yellow card) 53'; Rodriguez 71'; Obregón, Jr. 85'; Martinez (yellow card) 88' | Report | van Ewijk (yellow card) 54'; Duke (yellow card) 55'; Orozco (red card) 90+2' | Stadium: H-E-B Park; Attendance: 3,502; Referee: Gabriele Giusti |

| October 5 31 | Orange County SC | 2–0 | OKC Energy FC | Irvine, California |
| 7:00 PM | Forrester 53'; Leonardo (yellow card) 74'; Amico 75' | Report | Hyland (yellow card) 25' (yellow-red card) 43' | Stadium: Championship Soccer Stadium; Attendance: 3,428; Referee: Michael Radchuk |

| October 9 32 | Real Monarchs | 2–0 | Orange County SC | Herriman, Utah |
| 8:00 PM | Schmitt (yellow card) 50'; Quinn 73' (o.g.); Chang 83' | Report | Seaton (yellow card) 50' | Stadium: Zions Bank Stadium; Attendance: 2,316; Referee: Elton García |

| October 12 33 | Sacramento Republic FC | 2–3 | Orange County SC | Sacramento, California |
| 7:30 PM | Iwasa 6', 64'; McCrary (yellow card) 17'; Skundrich (yellow card) 90+1'; Taintor (yellow card) 90+5' | Report | Jones 16'; Alston (yellow card) 20'; Vinicius 26', (yellow card) 56'; Forrester (yellow card) 43'; Orozco 78'; Due (yellow card) 90+5'; Quinn (yellow card) 90+5' | Stadium: Papa Murphy's Park; Attendance: 11,569; Referee: Mark Allatin |

| October 19 34 | Orange County SC | 2–0 | Fresno FC | Irvine, California |
| 7:00 PM | Forrester 45'; Quinn 87' (pen.) | Report | Lawal (yellow card) 29' (yellow-red card) 41'; Moses (yellow card) 34' del Campo (red card) 86'; Strong (yellow card) 87' | Stadium: Championship Soccer Stadium; Attendance: 5,122; Referee: Elijio Arreguin |

==== USL Cup Playoffs ====
| October 26 Quarterfinals | Real Monarchs | 6–2 | Orange County SC | Herriman, Utah |
| 1:00 PM PDT | Chang 13'; Martinez 28'; Mulholland (yellow card) 34'; Blake 59', 90'; Schmitt 77'; Holt 81' | Report | Orozco 35', (yellow card) 80'; Forrester (yellow card) 40' (red card) 49'; Hume (yellow card) 67'; Seaton 90+1' | Stadium: Zions Bank Stadium; Attendance: 2,749; Referee: Ismir Pekmic |

=== U.S. Open Cup ===
As a member of the USL Championship, Orange County SC entered the tournament in the Second Round on May 15, 2019

| May 15 Second Round | Orange County SC | 2–2 (a.e.t.) (3–5 p) | Orange County FC (NPSL) | Irvine, California |
| 7:30 PM PDT | Davis 13' (o.g.); Jones 87' | Report | Collins 27'; Flores (yellow card) 84'; Davis (yellow card) 90'; Holland 90+2' | Stadium: Orange County Great Park; Attendance: 400; Referee: Samantha Martinez |
| | Penalties |
| | Quinn (penalty missed); Forrester (penalty scored); Ramos-Godoy (penalty scored); Trotter (penalty scored) | | (penalty scored) Arreola; (penalty scored) Collins; (penalty scored) Ten Bosch; (penalty scored) Lombardi; (penalty scored) Shelton |

== Home attendance ==
| Game | Date | Opponent | Reported Attendance |
|---|---|---|---|
| 1 | Saturday, March 16 | Tulsa Roughnecks | 3,023 |
| 2 | Saturday, March 23 | New Mexico United | 2,320 |
| 3 | Saturday, April 6 | Colorado Springs Switchbacks | 1,726 |
| 4 | Wednesday, April 10 | Tacoma Defiance | 1,558 |
| 5 | Saturday, May 4 | Phoenix Rising | 5,013 |
| 6 | Saturday, May 18 | Austin Bold | 4,240 |
| 7 | Saturday, June 1 | Rio Grande Valley FC Toros | 3,280 |
| 8 | Saturday, June 22 | Portland Timbers 2 | 3,172 |
| 9 | Saturday, June 29 | LA Galaxy 2 | 3,702 |
| 10 | Saturday, July 20 | San Antonio FC | 1,723 |
| 11 | Wednesday, July 24 | Reno 1868 FC | 2,838 |
| 12 | Saturday, July 27 | Sacramento Republic | 2,860 |
| 13 | Saturday, August 17 | Las Vegas Lights FC | 3,287 |
| 14 | Saturday, August 24 | Real Monarchs SLC | 3,053 |
| 15 | Saturday, September 14 | El Paso Locomotive | 3,913 |
| 16 | Saturday, October 5 | Oklahoma City Energy FC | 3,428 |
| 17 | Saturday, October 19 | Fresno FC | 5,122 |
| | | Total | 54,258 |
| | | Average | 3,192 |
