= 2020 Orange County SC season =

Orange County SC
2020 season
- Owner: James Keston
- Head coach: Braeden Cloutier
- USL Championship: Group B: 3rd Western Conf.: 9th
- USL Championship Playoffs: Did not qualify
- U.S. Open Cup: Cancelled
- Highest home attendance: 3,188 (March 7 vs. ELP)
- Average home league attendance: 3,188
- Biggest win: SD 0–2 OC (Aug. 12); LV 2–4 OC (Oct. 3)
- Biggest defeat: LV 3–1 OC (Aug. 25); SD 2–0 OC (Sept. 13); LA 3–1 OC (Sept. 30)
Home colors	Away colors

The 2020 Orange County SC season was the club's tenth season of existence, and their tenth consecutive season in the United Soccer League Championship, the second tier of American soccer. Orange County were also scheduled to compete in the U.S. Open Cup.

== Roster ==
As of February 25, 2020

No.	Position	Nation	Player
1	GK	DEN	Frederik Due
2	DF	USA	Kevin Alston
3	DF	SCO	Matthew Shiels (on loan from Rangers)
4	DF	IRL	Rob Kiernan
5	DF	USA	Blake Malone
6	DF	USA	Michael Orozco
7	FW	DEN	Thomas Enevoldsen
8	MF	USA	Seth Casiple
9	FW	USA	Sean Okoli
11	MF	ENG	Harry Forrester
12	MF	USA	Daniel Crisostomo
14	MF	USA	Aodhan Quinn
15	DF	NIR	Danny Finlayson (on loan from Rangers)
16	FW	USA	Kevin Coleman
17	FW	USA	Darwin Jones
18	MF	NIR	Cammy Palmer (on loan from Rangers)
20	MF	USA	Brian Iloski
21	MF	USA	Francis Jacobs
22	DF	USA	Nathan Smith
24	GK	USA	Daniel Faundez
25	GK	USA	Aaron Cervantes
27	MF	USA	Edson Alvarado
33	FW	USA	Diego Lopez

== Technical staff ==
Role	Name
General Manager	Oliver Wyss
Assistant GM	Peter Nugent
Technical director	Frans Hoek
Head coach	Braeden Cloutier
Assistant coach	Richard Chaplow
Strength & Conditioning	Claudio Trabattoni
Asst Strength & Conditioning	Dan Sparks
Goalkeeping coach	Victor Nogueira
Team Operations	Jakob Harding
Athletic Trainer	Mitchell Deyhle
U23 Head Coach	Jerry Tamashiro
U23 Assistant Coach	Didier Crettenand

== Competitions ==
=== USL Championship ===
==== Standings — Group B ====
Pos	Team	Pld	W	D	L	GF	GA	GD	Pts	PPG	Qualification
1	Phoenix Rising FC	16	11	2	3	46	17	+29	35	2.19	Advance to USL Championship Playoffs
2	LA Galaxy II	16	8	2	6	29	32	−3	26	1.63	Advance to USL Championship Playoffs
3	Orange County SC	16	7	3	6	18	18	0	24	1.50	
4	San Diego Loyal SC	16	6	5	5	17	18	−1	23	1.44	
5	Las Vegas Lights FC	16	2	5	9	24	34	−10	11	0.69	

Source: USL

==== Match results ====
On December 20, 2019, the USL announced the 2020 season schedule, creating the following fixture list for the early part of Orange County's season.

March 6 1	Orange County SC	0–0	El Paso Locomotive FC	Irvine, California
7:00 PM (PST)		Report	Fox (yellow card) 53'; Rebellón (yellow card) 58'	Stadium: Championship Soccer Stadium; Attendance: 3,188; Referee: Michael Radchuk

In the preparations for the resumption of league play following the shutdown prompted by the COVID-19 pandemic, the remainder of Orange County's schedule was announced on July 2.

July 16 2	Orange County SC	1–1	Phoenix Rising FC	Irvine, California
6:00 PM PDT	Forrester (yellow card) 28'; Smith (yellow card) 45+3'; Coleman 74'	Report	Asante (yellow card) 15'; Flemmings 64'; Kontoh (red card) 90+3'	Stadium: Championship Soccer Stadium; Referee: Brandon Stevis

July 25 3	Orange County SC	1–0	Phoenix Rising FC	Irvine, California
7:00 PM PDT	Okoli 20'; Crisostomo (yellow card) 45'; Orozco (yellow card) 90+1'	Report	Moar (yellow card) 9' (yellow-red card) 45'; Barmby (yellow card) 71'	Stadium: Championship Soccer Stadium; Referee: Michael Radchuk

July 29 4	Sacramento Republic FC	P–P	Orange County SC	Sacramento, California
TBA PM PDT				Stadium: Papa Murphy's Park; Referee: Elijio Arreguin
Note: Match postponed due to a positive COVID-19 test result from a previous opponent of Sacramento Republic FC.

August 7 5	Orange County SC	P–P	LA Galaxy II	Irvine, California
19:00				Stadium: Championship Soccer Stadium
Note: Match postponed due to multiple positive tests for COVID-19 in the LA Galaxy II organization.

August 12 6	San Diego Loyal SC	0–2	Orange County SC	San Diego, California
7:00 PM PDT	Alvarez (yellow card) 28'; Klimenta (yellow card) 56'; Tumi Moshobane (yellow card) 76'	Report	Okoli 65'; Quinn (yellow card) 53' (goal) 84'; Alvarado (yellow card) 90+1'	Stadium: Torero Stadium; Referee: Brandon Stevis

August 15 7	Orange County SC	1–0	Las Vegas Lights FC	Irvine, California
7:00 PM PDT	Quinn 69'; Okoli (yellow card) 89'	Report	Moses (yellow card) 9'; Waggoner (yellow card) 45' del Campo (yellow card) 74'	Stadium: Orange County Great Park; Referee: Michael Radchuk

August 22 8	LA Galaxy II	1–2	Orange County SC	Carson, California
7:00 PM PDT	Cuevas 20'; Saldana (yellow card) 25'; Vázquez (yellow card) 84'	Report	Okoli 14'; Smith (yellow card) 50'; Palmer 59', (yellow card) 72'	Stadium: Dignity Health Sports Park; Referee: William Hoffman

August 25 9	Las Vegas Lights FC	3–1	Orange County SC	Las Vegas, Nevada
7:00 PM PDT	del Campo 18'; Gr. Robinson (yellow card) 52'; Fenwick (yellow card) 62'; Burgos (penalty missed) 68'; Frischknecht 84'; Sandoval 90+2'	Report	Quinn 12' (pen.); Alston (yellow card) 60'	Stadium: Cashman Field; Referee: Brandon Stevis

August 29 10	Orange County SC	0–0	San Diego Loyal SC	Irvine, California
7:00 PM PDT	Palmer (yellow card) 58'; Crisostomo (yellow card) 90+7'	Report	Stoneman (yellow card) 22'; C. Martin (yellow card) 42'; Adams (yellow card) 45+6'	Stadium: Championship Soccer Stadium; Referee: Samantha Martinez

September 2 5	Orange County SC	2–1	LA Galaxy II	Irvine, California
7:00 PM PDT	Okoli 25', 38'; Crisostomo (yellow card) 55'; Finlayson (yellow card) 59'	Report	Perez 2'; Vera (yellow card) 51'; Hernandez (yellow card) 73'	Stadium: Championship Soccer Stadium; Referee: Karen Callado
Note: Match originally scheduled for August 7.

September 5 10	Orange County SC	1–2	LA Galaxy II	Irvine, California
7:00 PM PDT	Alston (yellow card) 25'; Iloski (yellow card) 30'; Palmer 60'; Quinn (yellow card) 65'; Finlayson (yellow card) 85'; Kiernan (yellow card) 90+2'	Report	Williams 8'; Vázquez (yellow card) 22'; Cuevas 27'; Nava (yellow card) 48'; Saldana (yellow card) 85'	Stadium: Orange County Great Park; Referee: Joseph Salinas

September 9 4	Sacramento Republic FC	2–1	Orange County SC	Sacramento, California
7:30 PM PDT	Formella (yellow card) 48', (goal) 79'; Lopez (red card) 58'; Bijev 87'	Report	Okoli 5'; Quinn (yellow card) 34'; Palmer (yellow card) 72'	Stadium: Papa Murphy's Park; Referee: Elijio Arreguin
Note: Re-schedule of postponed July 29, 2020 match.

September 13 11	San Diego Loyal SC	2–0	Orange County SC	San Diego, California
7:00 PM PDT	Stoneman (yellow card) 9'; Berry (yellow card) 22'; Guido 41', 64'; Tarek Morad (yellow card) 45+2'; Alvarez (yellow card) 82'; Adams (yellow card) 86'; Spencer (yellow card) 90+5'	Report	Kiernan (yellow card) 22'; Quinn (yellow card) 72'	Stadium: Torero Stadium; Referee: Ricardo Fierro

September 18 12	Orange County SC	1–0	Las Vegas Lights FC	Irvine, California
7:00 PM PDT	Orozco (yellow card) 43'; Jones 63'; Okoli (yellow card) 64'; Quinn (yellow card) 69'; Smith (yellow card) 81'	Report	Fehr (red card) 29'; Moses (yellow card) 46' (yellow-red card) 59'; Torre (yellow card) 54'; Burgos (yellow card) 67'	Stadium: Orange County Great Park; Referee: Omeed Azadpour

September 26 13	Phoenix Rising FC	1–0	Orange County SC	Scottsdale, Arizona
7:30 PM PDT	Dadashov 37', (yellow card) 84'; Lambert (yellow card) 45+2'; Flemmings (yellow card) 60'	Report	Alston (yellow card) 83'; Quinn (yellow card) 89'	Stadium: Casino Arizona Field; Referee: Isaiah Vlad

September 30 14	LA Galaxy II	3–1	Orange County SC	Carson, California
7:00 PM PDT	Williams 10', 68' (pen.); Alvarado Jr. (yellow card) 54'; Perez (yellow card) 58'; Saldana (yellow card) 73'; Hernandez 90+2'	Report	Okoli 6'; Alston (yellow card) 67'; Smith (yellow card) 71'	Stadium: Dignity Health Sports Park; Referee: Jon Freemon

October 3 15	Las Vegas Lights FC	2–4	Orange County SC	Las Vegas, Nevada
7:30 PM PDT	Mendiola 24', 66'; Fehr (yellow card) 30'; Sandoval (yellow card) 73'; Murrell (red card) 90+3'	Report	Hoffman 17', 21', 27'; Henry (yellow card) 37'; Casiple (yellow card) 68' (yellow-red card) 76'; Quinn 90+2' (pen.)	Stadium: Cashman Field; Attendance: 250; Referee: Alejandro Mariscal

=== U.S. Open Cup ===
As a USL Championship club, Orange County will enter the competition in the Second Round, to be played April 7–9.

April 8 2nd round	Orange County SC (California)	P–P	California United Strikers FC (NISA)	Irvine, CA
7:30 PM PDT				Stadium: Championship Soccer Stadium
Note: Match postponed due to the COVID-19 pandemic
