= 2020 Phoenix Rising FC season =

Phoenix Rising FC
2020 season
- Owners: List: Berke Bakay Brett M. Johnson Alex Zheng Tim Riester Mark Detmer Didier Drogba Brandon McCarthy Diplo Pete Wentz David Rappaport Dave Stearns Rick Hauser William Kraus Kevin Kusatsu Mark Leber Jim Scussel Christopher Yeung
- Manager: Rick Schantz (11-3-2); Blair Gavin (Interim)(3-0-0)
- Stadium: Casino Arizona Field
- USL playoffs: Finalist
- Top goalscorer: Junior Flemmings (14)
- Highest home attendance: 6,585 (March 7 v. Portland Timbers 2)
- Average home league attendance: Regular season: 6,585
- Biggest win: PHX 6–1 POR (March 7)
- Biggest defeat: OC 1–0 PHX (July 25); RNO 2–1 PHX (August 29); PHX 2–3 SD (September 19)
Home colors	Away colors	Third colors

The 2020 Phoenix Rising FC season was the club's seventh season in the USL Championship and their fourth as Rising FC. They were the defending USL Championship regular season champions.

== Competitions ==
=== Friendlies ===
All times from this point on Mountain Standard Time (UTC-07:00)

January 25, 2020 Scrimmage	Phoenix Rising FC	0–4	Sporting Kansas City	Tucson, Arizona
11:00 AM MST		Report	Sallói 23'; Busio 43', 50'; Harris 70'	Stadium: Kino North Stadium

January 29, 2020 Friendly	Phoenix Rising FC	0–3	FC Cincinnati	Tucson, Arizona
3:00 PM MST		Report	McCabe 22'; Gutman 42'; Gyau 53'	Stadium: Kino North Stadium

February 8, 2020 Friendly	Grand Canyon University	2–6	Phoenix Rising FC	Phoenix, Arizona
7:00 PM MST	Rasmussen 49' (pen.); Vannier 68'	Report	Flemmings 51', 58', 86'; Barmby 63'; Trialist 64'; Asante 73'	Stadium: GCU Stadium

February 12, 2020 Scrimmage	Phoenix Rising FC	2–1	New York Red Bulls	Oro Valley, Arizona
	Kunga 43'; Farrell 50'	Report	Barlow 0'	Stadium: Naranja Park; Attendance: Closed to the public

February 15, 2020 Visit Tucson Sun Cup	Phoenix Rising FC	0–1	Columbus Crew SC	Scottsdale, Arizona
7:00 PM MST		Report; Report	Zardes 73'	Stadium: Casino Arizona Field

February 19, 2020 Visit Tucson Sun Cup	Phoenix Rising FC	2–1	Sporting Kansas City	Scottsdale, Arizona
7:00 PM MST	Moar 66'; Calistri 78'	Report; Report	Russell 56'	Stadium: Casino Arizona Field

February 22, 2020 Visit Tucson Sun Cup	Phoenix Rising FC	3–2	Real Salt Lake	Scottsdale, Arizona
7:00 PM MST	Farrell 19'; Asante 39'; Bakero 57'	Report; Report	Kreilach 11'; Meram 89'	Stadium: Casino Arizona Field

February 26, 2020 Scrimmage	Phoenix Rising FC	0–1	New Mexico United	Tucson, Arizona
11:30 AM MST		Report	Wehan 37'	Stadium: Kino North Stadium; Attendance: Closed to the public

February 29, 2020 Scrimmage	Phoenix Rising FC	3–3	El Paso Locomotive FC	Tucson, Arizona
12:00 PM MST	Bakero 51' (pen.); Flemmings 68'; Asante 80'	Report; Report	Mares 34', 43'; Gómez 55'	Stadium: Kino North Stadium; Attendance: Closed to the public

=== USL Championship ===
Overall								Home						Away					
Pld	W	D	L	GF	GA	GD	Pts	W	D	L	GF	GA	GD	W	D	L	GF	GA	GD
16	11	2	3	46	17	+29	35	8	0	1	32	9	+23	3	2	2	14	8	+6

Source: Match reports

==== Results by round ====
Round	1	2	3	4	5	6	7	8	9	10	11	12	13	14	15	16
Stadium	H	H	A	A	H	H	H	A	A	A	A	H	H	H	A	H
Result	W	W	D	L	W	W	W	W	D	L	W	W	L	W	W	W
Position	1	2	1	3	2	1	1	1	1	1	1	1	1	1	1	1

Updated to match(es) played on October 3, 2020. Source: Match reports
A = Away; H = Home; W = Win; D = Draw; L = Loss

==== Matches ====
March 7, 2020 1	Phoenix Rising FC	6–1	Portland Timbers 2	Scottsdale, Arizona
7:30 PM MST	Dadashov 13', 24', 65'; Flemmings 31'; Lambert (yellow card) 75'; Whelan (yellow card) 85'; Kunga 90'; Asante 90+3'	Report; Report	Conechny 45+2'; Bonilla (yellow card) 79'	Stadium: Casino Arizona Field; Attendance: 6,585; Referee: Jonathan Bilinski

July 11, 2020 2	Phoenix Rising FC	4–0	LA Galaxy II	Scottsdale, Arizona
7:00 PM MST	Flemmings 9'; Bakero 40' (pen.); Asante 45+2', 81'; King (yellow card) 54'	Report; Report	Bawa (yellow card) 39'; Ontiveros (yellow card) 55'	Stadium: Casino Arizona Field; Attendance: 0 (Note: The remainder of the competition, is played behind closed doors due to the COVID-19 pandemic in North America.); Referee: Isaiah Vlad

July 16, 2020 3	Orange County SC	1–1	Phoenix Rising FC	Irvine, California
6:00 PM MST	Forrester (yellow card) 28'; Smith (yellow card) 45+3'; Coleman 74'	Report; Report	Asante (yellow card) 15'; Flemmings 64'; Kontoh (red card) 90+3'	Stadium: Championship Soccer Stadium; Attendance: 0 Referee: Brandon Stevis

July 25, 2020 4	Orange County SC	1–0	Phoenix Rising FC	Irvine, California
7:00 PM MST	Okoli 20'; Crisostomo (yellow card) 45'; Orozco (yellow card) 90+1'	Report; Report	Moar (yellow card) 9' (red card) 45'; Barmby (yellow card) 71'	Stadium: Championship Soccer Stadium; Attendance: 0 Referee: Michael Radchuk

August 1, 2020 5	Phoenix Rising FC	3–1	El Paso Locomotive FC	Scottsdale, Arizona
7:30 PM MDT	Dadashov 19' (pen.); Asante 36'; Flemmings 45+6'; Lambert (yellow card) 67'; Dick (yellow card) 90+6'	Report; Report	Gómez 15'; Yuma (yellow card) 21'; Beckie (yellow card) 40'	Stadium: Casino Arizona Field; Attendance: 0 Referee: Alan Martinez

August 8, 2020 6	Phoenix Rising FC	5–2	New Mexico United	Scottsdale, Arizona
7:30 PM MST	Flemmings 17', 73', 86'; Dadashov 22'; Cochran 52'; Lambert (yellow card) 57'; Calistri (yellow card) 80'	Report; Report	Parkes 5'; Guzmán (yellow card) 45+1'; Tinari 59'; Moreno (yellow card) 87'	Stadium: Casino Arizona Field; Attendance: 0 Referee: Lukasz Szpala

August 15, 2020 7	Phoenix Rising FC	2–0	San Diego Loyal SC	Scottsdale, Arizona
7:30 PM MST	Flemmings 26'; King 59'	Report; Report	Martin (yellow card) 44'; Klimenta (yellow card) 56'; Nazira (yellow card) 82'	Stadium: Casino Arizona Field; Attendance: 0 Referee: Isaiah Vlad

August 19, 2020 8	LA Galaxy II	1–4	Phoenix Rising FC	Carson, California
2:00 PM MST	Vázquez (yellow card) 6'; Williams 70'	Report; Report	Flemmings 23'; Moar 36'; Schweitzer 63'; Asante 90+6'	Stadium: Dignity Health Sports Park; Attendance: 0 Referee: Brandon Stevis

August 22, 2020 9	Las Vegas Lights FC	3–3	Phoenix Rising FC	Las Vegas, Nevada
7:30 PM MST	Chester 80'; Moses (yellow card) 84'; Cochran 90+6' (o.g.) del Campo 90+9'	Report; Report	Dadashov 4'; King (yellow card) 22'; Kontoh (yellow card) 59'; Flemmings 68'; Stanton (yellow card) 74'; Asante 90' (pen.)	Stadium: Cashman Field; Attendance: 0 Referee: Malik Badawi

August 29, 2020 10	Reno 1868 FC	2–1	Phoenix Rising FC	Reno, Nevada
7:00 PM MST	Janjigian (yellow card) 41'; Langsdorf 62'; Hertzog 79', (yellow card) 90+6'	Report; Report	Dadashov 76', (yellow card) 90+6'; Calistri (yellow card) 81'; Lambert (yellow card) 87'	Stadium: Greater Nevada Field; Attendance: 0 Referee: Elijio Arreguin

September 5, 2020 11	Las Vegas Lights FC	0–2	Phoenix Rising FC	Las Vegas, Nevada
7:30 PM MST	Fehr (yellow card) 45+1'; Sandoval (yellow card) 50' de la Fuente (yellow card) 52'; Amarikwa (yellow card) 90'	Report; Report	King (yellow card) 14'; Flemmings 53' (pen.); Cochran (yellow card) 73'; Bakero (yellow card) 74'; Dadashov 90+4'	Stadium: Cashman Field; Attendance: 0 Referee: William Hoffman

September 11, 2020 12	Phoenix Rising FC	5–1	Las Vegas Lights FC	Scottsdale, Arizona
7:30 PM MST	Dadashov 27', 44'; Flemmings 55'; Stanton 57'; Bakero 72' (pen.); Farrell (yellow card) 90+2'	Report; Report	Moses (yellow card) 41'; Fenwick (yellow card) 70' de la Fuente 82'	Stadium: Casino Arizona Field; Referee: Isaiah Vlad

September 19, 2020 13	Phoenix Rising FC	2–3	San Diego Loyal SC	Scottsdale, Arizona
7:30 PM MST	Flemmings 41', 89'; Barmby (yellow card) 90+2'	Report; Report	Rubin 3', 12', 45+4'; Stoneman (yellow card) 32' (yellow-red card) 90+7'; Klimenta (yellow card) 54'; Moshobane (yellow card) 63'; Metcalf (yellow card) 72'; Martin (yellow card) 87'	Stadium: Casino Arizona Field; Referee: Farhad Dadkho

September 26, 2020 14	Phoenix Rising FC	1–0	Orange County SC	Scottsdale, Arizona
7:30 PM MST	Dadashov 37', (yellow card) 84'; Lambert (yellow card) 45+2'; Flemmings (yellow card) 60'	Report; Report	Alston (yellow card) 83'; Quinn (yellow card) 89'	Stadium: Casino Arizona Field; Referee: Isaiah Vlad

September 30, 2020 15	San Diego Loyal SC	0–3 (Forfeit)	Phoenix Rising FC	San Diego, California
7:00 PM MST	Berry 2'; Rubín 20', 45+7'; Stoneman (yellow card) 31'; C. Martin (red card) 45+8'	Report	Stanton (yellow card) 27', (goal) 45'; Calistri (yellow card) 28'; Moar (yellow card) 45+5'; Farrell (yellow card) 45+6'	Stadium: Torero Stadium; Referee: Joseph Salinas
Note: Match abandoned at start of second half due to Loyal walking off the pitch in protest of an alleged homophobic slur. According to the FIFA disciplinary code, the match is forfeit to Phoenix and scored as a 3:0 victory for them.

October 3, 2020 16	Phoenix Rising FC	4–1	LA Galaxy II	Scottsdale, Arizona
7:30 PM MST	Moar 10'; King (yellow card) 12'; Stanton 27', 57'; Cochran 51'	Report	Williams 6'; Cuevas (yellow card) 28'; Bawa (yellow card) 40'; Ferkranus (yellow card) 74'	Stadium: Casino Arizona Field; Referee: Ricardo Fierro

==== Group table ====
Pos	Team	Pld	W	D	L	GF	GA	GD	Pts	PPG	Qualification
1	Phoenix Rising FC	16	11	2	3	46	17	+29	35	2.19	Advance to USL Championship Playoffs
2	LA Galaxy II	16	8	2	6	29	32	−3	26	1.63	Advance to USL Championship Playoffs
3	Orange County SC	16	7	3	6	18	18	0	24	1.50	
4	San Diego Loyal SC	16	6	5	5	17	18	−1	23	1.44	
5	Las Vegas Lights FC	16	2	5	9	24	34	−10	11	0.69	

Source: USL

==== Conference table ====
Pos	Team	Pld	W	L	T	GF	GA	GD	Pts	PPG	Qualification
1	Reno 1868 FC	16	11	2	3	43	21	+22	36	2.25	Conference Quarterfinals
2	Phoenix Rising FC	16	11	3	2	46	17	+29	35	2.19	Conference Quarterfinals
3	San Antonio FC	16	10	3	3	30	14	+16	33	2.06	Conference Quarterfinals
4	El Paso Locomotive FC	16	9	2	5	24	14	+10	32	2.00	Conference Quarterfinals
5	Sacramento Republic	16	8	2	6	27	17	+10	30	1.88	Conference Quarterfinals
6	New Mexico United	15	8	4	3	23	17	+6	27	1.80	Conference Quarterfinals
7	FC Tulsa	15	6	2	7	21	16	+5	25	1.67	Conference Quarterfinals
8	LA Galaxy II	16	8	6	2	29	32	−3	26	1.63	Conference Quarterfinals
9	Orange County SC	16	7	6	3	18	18	0	24	1.50	
10	San Diego Loyal SC	16	6	5	5	17	18	−1	23	1.44	
11	Austin Bold FC	16	5	4	7	30	26	+4	22	1.38	
12	Tacoma Defiance	16	4	10	2	25	32	−7	14	0.88	
13	Colorado Springs Switchbacks	16	2	7	7	19	28	−9	13	0.81	
14	Real Monarchs	16	3	11	2	14	25	−11	11	0.69	
15	Las Vegas Lights FC	16	2	9	5	24	34	−10	11	0.69	
16	Rio Grande Valley Toros	14	2	9	3	17	28	−11	9	0.64	
17	OKC Energy FC	16	1	8	7	12	29	−17	10	0.63	
18	Portland Timbers 2	16	3	13	0	20	50	−30	9	0.56	

Source: USL Championship
Rules for classification: 1) points per game; 2) points; 3) total wins; 4) total goal differential; 5) total goals scored; 6) disciplinary points; 7) coin toss or drawing of lots.

=== USL Championship Playoffs ===
==== Conference Playoffs ====
October 10, 2020 Quarterfinals	Phoenix Rising FC	1–0 (a.e.t.)	Sacramento Republic FC	Scottsdale, Arizona
7:30 pm MST	Dadashov (yellow card) 44'; Lambert (yellow card) 109'; Asante 114'	Report; Report	Formella (yellow card) 12'; López (yellow card) 45'; Hilliard-Arce (yellow card) 74'; McCrary (yellow card) 87'; Keinan (yellow card) 90+1'	Stadium: Casino Arizona Field; Referee: Elvis Osmanovic

October 17, 2020 Semifinals	Reno 1868 FC	2–2 (a.e.t.) (4–5 p)	Phoenix Rising FC	Reno, Nevada
6:00 PM PDT	Hertzog 6'; Janjigian (yellow card) 31'; Partida 40'; Bone (yellow card) 57'; Langsdorf (yellow card) 79'; Ycaza (yellow card) 90+4'; Boudadi (yellow card) 119'	Report; Report	King (yellow card) 23'; Lambert 45+2', (yellow card) 51'; Lowe (yellow card) 65'; Asante 71'; Moar (yellow card) 94'	Stadium: Greater Nevada Field; Attendance: 700; Referee: Kevin Broadley
	Penalties
	Hertzog (penalty scored); Alfaro (penalty scored); Richards (penalty scored); Gleadle (penalty scored); Apodaca (penalty missed)		(penalty scored) Farrell; (penalty scored) Whelan; (penalty scored) Calistri; (penalty scored) King; (penalty scored) Dadashov

October 24, 2020 Final	Phoenix Rising FC	1–1 (a.e.t.) (4–2 p)	El Paso Locomotive FC	Scottsdale, Arizona
7:30 PM MST	Schweitzer 18'; Farrell (yellow card) 95'; Asante (yellow card) 109'; Lowe (yellow card) 113'	Report; Report	Yuma (yellow card) 4'; King (yellow card) 54'; Rebellón 59', (yellow card) 94'; Herrera (yellow card) 105+2'; Diaz (yellow card) 106'; Ryan (yellow card) 108'; Carrijó (yellow card) 111'	Stadium: Casino Arizona Field; Referee: Elton García
	Penalties
	Bakero (penalty scored); Whelan (penalty scored); Farrell (penalty scored); Moar (penalty scored)		(penalty scored) Carrijó; (penalty missed) Ross; (penalty scored) Ryan; (penalty missed) Gómez

==== USL Championship Final ====
The Final was cancelled the day before because several Tampa Bay players and staff tested positive for COVID-19. No league champion was chosen.

November 1, 2020 USL Final	Tampa Bay Rowdies	cancelled	Phoenix Rising FC	St. Petersburg, Florida
8:30 PM EST				Stadium: Al Lang Stadium
Note: Phoenix relinquished the right to host the final as a gesture of respect to the LGBTQ community for the incident between Phoenix Rising and San Diego Loyal on September 30.

=== U.S. Open Cup ===
The U.S. Open Cup was cancelled.

	Phoenix Rising FC	cancelled	FC Golden State Force or FC Arizona	Scottsdale, Arizona
7:30 PM MST				Stadium: Casino Arizona Field
Note: Cancelled on August 17 due to COVID-19 pandemic in the United States

== Roster ==
No.	Name	Nationality	Position(s)	Date of birth (age)	Signed in	Previous club
Goalkeepers
18	Eric Dick	(United States)	GK	October 3, 1994 (age 32)	2020	(United States) Sporting Kansas City (loan)
22	Landon Carter	(United States)	GK	October 23, 2003 (age 23)	2020	(United States) Phoenix Rising Academy
28	Zac Lubin	(United States)	GK	August 15, 1989 (age 37)	2020	(Sweden) Ljungskile SK
Defenders
2	Darnell King	(United States)	DF	September 23, 1990 (age 36)	2020	(United States) Nashville SC
3	A. J. Cochran	(United States)	DF	February 9, 1993 (age 33)	2020	(United States) Atlanta United 2
4	Corey Whelan	(Republic of Ireland)	DF	December 12, 1997 (age 28)	2020	(England) Crewe Alexandra
13	Kyle Bjornethun	(United States)	DF	March 15, 1995 (age 31)	2020	(United States) FC Tucson
15	Joe Farrell	(United States)	DF	February 13, 1994 (age 32)	2020	(United States) Rochester Rhinos
16	Austin Ledbetter	(United States)	DF	July 15, 1995 (age 31)	2020	(United States) FC Tucson
23	Owusu-Ansah Kontoh	(Ghana)	DF	August 24, 1993 (age 33)	2020	(United States) Orange County SC
31	Damion Lowe	(Jamaica)	DF	May 5, 1993 (age 33)	2020	(Norway) IK Start
Midfielders
6	Jordan Schweitzer	(Canada)	MF	April 19, 1994 (age 32)	2020	(United States) Colorado Springs Switchbacks
8	Jack Barmby	(England)	MF	November 14, 1994 (age 31)	2020	(United States) San Antonio FC
10	Jon Bakero	(Spain)	MF	November 5, 1996 (age 29)	2020	(Canada) Toronto FC
12	Sam Stanton	(Scotland)	MF	April 19, 1994 (age 32)	2020	(Scotland) Dundee United
17	Santi Moar	(Spain)	MF	September 5, 1993 (age 33)	2020	(United States) New Mexico United
19	José Aguinaga	(Spain)	MF	May 11, 1995 (age 31)	2020	(United States) New York Red Bulls II
27	Kevon Lambert	(Jamaica)	MF	March 22, 1997 (age 29)	2020	(Jamaica) Montego Bay United
Forwards
7	Junior Flemmings	(Jamaica)	FW	January 16, 1996 (age 30)	2020	(United States) Tampa Bay Rowdies
9	Rufat Dadashov	(Azerbaijan)	FW	September 29, 1991 (age 35)	2020	(Germany) SC Preußen Münster
14	Ansuh Kanneh	(United States)	FW	December 2, 2005 (age 20)	2020	(United States) Phoenix Rising Academy
20	Solomon Asante	(Ghana)	FW	March 6, 1990 (age 36)	2020	(Ghana) TP Mazembe
21	Joey Calistri	(United States)	FW	November 20, 1993 (age 32)	2020	(United States) Saint Louis FC
24	Denis Conteh	(United States)	FW	September 18, 2001 (age 25)	2020	(United States) Phoenix Rising Academy
70	Lagos Kunga	(United States)	FW	October 20, 1998 (age 28)	2020	(United States) Atlanta United FC (loan)
87	Alex Krzykos	(United States)	FW	October 6, 2002 (age 24)	2020	(United States) Phoenix Rising Academy

Phoenix Rising Academy contract.

== Transfers ==
=== Loan in ===
Start date	End date	Position	No.	Player	From club
January 21, 2020	End of Season	Forward	70	(United States) Lagos Kunga	(United States) Atlanta United FC
February 4, 2020	End of Season	Goalkeeper	18	(United States) Eric Dick	(United States) Sporting Kansas City

=== Loan out ===
Start date	End date	Position	No.	Player	To club

== Statistics ==
#	Pos.	Name	GP	GS	Min.	Goals	Assists	A yellow rectangle, denoting the yellow penalty card shown to a player being cautioned	A red rectangle, denoting the red penalty card shown to a player being sent off
7	FW	(Jamaica) Junior Flemmings	14	14	1192	14	2	1	0
9	FW	(Azerbaijan) Rufat Dadashov	18	16	1465	11	4	3	0
20	FW	(Ghana) Solomon Asante	17	16	1537	8	9	2	0
12	MF	(Scotland) Sam Stanton	17	14	1220	3	1	1	0
10	MF	(Spain) Jon Bakero	18	16	1208	2	4	1	0
3	DF	(United States) A. J. Cochran	14	13	1157	2	0	1	0
17	MF	(Spain) Santi Moar	15	9	897	2	8	1	1
6	MF	(Canada) Jordan Schweitzer	16	4	502	2	1	0	0
2	DF	(United States) Darnell King	18	18	1697	1	1	5	0
27	MF	(Jamaica) Kevon Lambert	17	17	1603	1	3	7	0
70	FW	(United States) Lagos Kunga	9	0	73	1	1	0	0
4	DF	(Republic of Ireland) Corey Whelan	18	18	1709	0	0	1	0
15	DF	(United States) Joe Farrell	15	11	1066	0	1	2	0
23	DF	(Ghana) Owusu-Ansah Kontoh	8	6	526	0	0	1	1
21	FW	(United States) Joey Calistri	15	3	404	0	0	2	0
31	DF	(Jamaica) Damion Lowe	5	2	291	0	0	2	0
19	MF	(Spain) Jose Aguinaga	10	1	276	0	0	0	0
8	MF	(England) Jack Barmby	9	1	165	0	0	2	0
13	DF	(United States) Kyle Bjornethun	1	1	58	0	0	0	0
16	DF	(United States) Austin Ledbetter	1	0	5	0	0	0	0
25	FW	(United States) Ansuh Kanneh	1	0	3	0	0	0	0

=== Goalkeepers ===
#	Name	GP	GS	Min.	SV	GA	GAA	SO	A yellow rectangle, denoting the yellow penalty card shown to a player being cautioned	A red rectangle, denoting the red penalty card shown to a player being sent off
28	(United States) Zac Lubin	16	16	1530	46	16	0.941	5	0	0
18	(United States) Eric Dick	2	2	180	6	4	2.000	0	1	0

== See also ==
- 2020 in American soccer
- 2020 USL Championship season
- Phoenix Rising FC
- Casino Arizona Field
