= Kevin Coleman =

Kevin Coleman may refer to:

- Kevin Coleman Jr. (born 2003), American football player
- Kevin Coleman (musician), drummer with Smash Mouth
- Kevin Coleman (soccer) (born 1998), American soccer player
- Kevin Coleman (politician), American politician from Michigan
- Kevin Coleman (shot putter), winner of the 1992 and 1993 shot put at the NCAA Division I Indoor Track and Field Championships
