= 2021 Orange County SC season =

Orange County SC
2021 season
- Owner: James Keston
- Head coach: Richard Chaplow
- USL Championship: Pacific Division: 2nd Western Conf.: 1st
- USL Championship Playoffs: Champions
- U.S. Open Cup: Cancelled
- Top goalscorer: Ronaldo Damus
- Highest home attendance: 5,386 (November 20 vs. SAFC)
- Lowest home attendance: 2,042 (June 9 vs San Diego Loyal SC)
- Average home league attendance: 3,302
- Biggest win: LVL 0–3 OC (Sept 11)
- Biggest defeat: TAC 4–1 OC (Oct. 9)
Home colors	Away colors

The 2021 Orange County SC season was the club's eleventh season of existence, and their eleventh consecutive season in the United Soccer League Championship, the second tier of American soccer.

Due to the continuing COVID-19 worldwide pandemic, the 2021 USL Championship season divided the league into two conferences with two divisions each. Orange County played in the Pacific Division which included teams LA Galaxy II, Las Vegas Lights FC, Oakland Roots, Phoenix Rising FC, Sacramento Republic FC, San Diego Loyal, and Tacoma Defiance. Pacific Division teams played each division member four times for 28 games, with four out-of-division games to fill out the 32 game schedule. Orange County SC's out-of-conference opponents were: Colorado Springs Switchbacks FC, Rio Grande Valley FC, Charleston Battery, and El Paso Locomotive FC.

Orange County opened the season with a 6-2-3 record losses to opening day against Tacoma Defiance and a 88th minute loss to LA Galaxy II. In mid-July OC faltered only earning one win in eight games, including a 2–1 loss to 10-men San Diego Loyal, and dropping points in late game situations against Sacramento, Galaxy II, and Phoenix Rising. Following a mid-week 0–3 loss to Tacoma Defiance, head coach Braeden Cloutier was relieved of his duties and assistant coach Richard Chaplow was appointed as interim head coach.

Under Chaplow's leadership the team continued to struggle with a 3-3-2 record including a 1–4 loss to Tacoma Defiance, while dropping points in waning minute goals to El Paso and Phoenix Rising. Following the 1-4 Tacoma match, Orange County finished the regular season with a five-game win streak ending the regular season 15-10-7 with 52 points and 2nd place in the Pacific Division.

USL Playoff matchups were cross-division with Orange County matched up against Mountain Division 3rd place Switchbacks FC. Orange County defeated Switchbacks FC 1–0 at home in front of 4,194 fans. Ronaldo Damus scored the only goal of the contest in 1st half stoppage time. Orange County faced 1st-round upset Oakland Roots in the Western Conference Semifinal again at home and ended regulation and extra time at 0-0. Orange County advanced on penalties after Patrick Rakovsky stopped Oakland's Akeem Ward. In a dramatic finish, Ronald Damus' initial attempt was blocked by Oakland's Paul Blanchette, but was flagged for leaving the goal line early. Damus' second attempt was good and Orange County advanced to the Conference Final in front of 5,218 home fans, with a scoreline 0(6)-0(5). Orange County faced Conference favorite San Antonio FC at Championship Soccer Stadium in front of a record setting 5,386 fans. With goals by Damus and San Antonio's Marcus Epps, Orange County again went to penalties. San Antonio's Justin Dhillon's attempt went wide and Sean Okoli scored the winning goal advancing Orange County to the USL Championship Final for the club's first time.

Orange County faced the Tampa Bay Rowdies at Al Lang Stadium for the 2021 USL Championship Final in front of 7,521 fans. Tampa Bay was heavily favored to win by FiveThirtyEight with a 76% probability of winning in regulation. Similarly, betting odds heavily favorited the Rowdies with Twin Spires having Orange County as the +400 underdogs. The Rowdies controlled much of the game in the opening 20 minutes, until Kevin Alston fouled Yann Ekra in the penalty area and Rakovsky blocked Sebastián Guenzatti's PK attempt. Orange County responded with three unanswered goals by Damus (2) and Mikko Kuningas to finish the first half leading 3–0. Tampa Bay's Leo Fernandes scored in the 57th minute which would be the Rowdies only goal of the contest and the game ended regulation 3-1 and Orange County winning their first ever Championship title since the club's founding in 2010. Orange County SC finished the season with a nine-game win streak, outscoring opponents 5–2 in the playoffs and a total 47 goals for and 40 goals against.

== 2021 roster ==
As of July 24, 2022

No.	Position	Nation	Player
1	GK	GER	Patrick Rakovsky
33	GK	USA	Abraham Romero
2	DF	USA	Kevin Alston
16	DF	USA	Brent Richards
4	DF	IRL	Rob Kiernan
5	DF	USA	Blake Malone
6	DF	USA	Michael Orozco
7	FW	DEN	Thomas Enevoldsen
8	MF	USA	Seth Casiple
19	FW	USA	Sean Okoli
3	MF	USA	Dillon Powers
10	MF	USA	Brian Iloski
13	MF	USA	Thomas McCabe
23	DF	USA	Kobi Henry
11	FW	HAI	Ronaldo Damus
17	FW	USA	Darwin Jones
15	MF	ESA	Eric Calvillo
20	MF	USA	Ben Mines
21	MF	USA	Francis Jacobs
24	DF	USA	Nathan Smith
48	GK	USA	Danny Faundez
25	MF	FIN	Mikko Kuningas
9	FW	FIN	Eero Markkanen
18	FW	USA	Aidan Apodaca
26	FW	USA	Raymond Drai
