= Braeden Cloutier =

American soccer coach and former player

Personal information
- Date of birth: October 3, 1974 (age 52)
- Place of birth: Wichita, Kansas, United States
- Height: 5 ft 11 in (1.80 m)
- Positions: Forward; midfielder

Youth career
- 1992–1993: Hamburger SV

Senior career*
Years	Team	Apps	(Gls)
1993–1994	Hamburger SV II	14	(2)
1994	San Diego Sockers (indoor)	27	(13)
1994–1996	Wichita Wings (indoor)	63	(36)
1996	San Diego Sockers (indoor)	28	(27)
1997	MetroStars	17	(0)
1997–1998	→ Wichita Wings (loan; indoor)	25	(39)
1998–1999	San Jose Clash	56	(4)
1999–2001	Wichita Wings (indoor)	81	(87)
2000	Charleston Battery	13	(2)
2001–2002	New England Revolution	24	(0)
2002–2004	Cleveland Force (indoor)	28	(13)
2004–2005	San Diego Sockers (indoor)	6	(1)
2005–2006	Orange County Blue Star	15	(3)
2009–2012	San Diego Sockers (indoor)	5	(1)

Managerial career
- 2015–2017: Orange County SC (assistant)
- 2017–2021: Orange County SC
- * Club domestic league appearances and goals

Braeden Cloutier (born October 3, 1974) is an American soccer coach and former player who is the former head coach of Orange County SC. As a player, he spent five seasons in Major Soccer League and over twelve in various indoor leagues.

== Early life ==
Cloutier grew up in Wichita, Kansas, where he attended Northwest High School. In July 1992, he left high school and moved to Germany to play for Hamburger SV. He entered Hamburg's youth system, playing on their undefeated championship youth team of 1992–93.

== Professional ==
In 1993, he moved to the Hamburger SV reserve team for the 1993–94 Regionalliga Nord season.

=== Indoor ===
In 1994, he returned to the United States and signed with the Las Vegas Dustdevils of the Continental Indoor Soccer League. On June 8, 1994, the Dustdevils traded Cloutier to the San Diego Sockers in exchange for Tom Crane. He spent the 1994 season in San Diego, scoring thirteen goals in twenty-seven games. In the fall of 1994, he signed with the Wichita Wings of the National Professional Soccer League. At the time, the CISL and NPSL were in vicious competition and had refused to allow players to move between the two leagues. Cloutier's move from the Sockers to the Wings led to an unsuccessful legal action by the Sockers to prevent him from playing in Wichita. Despite the legal threats, Cloutier spent the entire 1994–1995 season in Wichita. In June 1995, the Sockers announced they had signed Cloutier for the upcoming CISL season. He denied it and sat out the season as the Wings and Sockers continued their legal battles over his playing rights. He returned to the Wings in the fall for the 1995–1996 NPSL season. In 1996, he finally returned to the Sockers for the summer indoor season.

=== Major League Soccer ===
In February 1997, the MetroStars selected Cloutier in the second round (fifteenth overall) of the 1997 MLS Supplemental Draft. He spent the 1997 season with the MetroStars then in October loaned him to the Wichita Wings for the 1997–1998 NPSL season. On January 31, 1998, the MetroStars traded him to the San Jose Earthquakes for a second round pick in the 1998 MLS College Draft. Cloutier spent two seasons in San Jose. The Earthquakes released him at the end of the 1999 season and on October 20, 1999, he signed a three-year contract with the Wichita Wings. He spent two winter indoor season with the Wings. In 2000, he played with the Charleston Battery in the USL A-League. On May 12, 2001, the New England Revolution claimed Cloutier off waivers from San Jose after Cloutier didn't resign with the Clash in 1999. Cloutier opted to sit out the 12 month restriction from Major League Soccer then signed with the Revolution in 2001. He was a key piece off the bench and spot starts for the Revs in the run to the 2002 MLS Cup game. He played two seasons with the New England Revolution and retired before the start of the 2003 season, due to injury complications in his hip.

=== Indoor ===
He then signed with the Cleveland Force in the Major Indoor Soccer League on February 7, 2003, and played six games through the rest of the season. He returned to the Force for the 2003–2004 season. On June 15, 2004, the Force sent Cloutier, along with Nevio Pizzolitto, to the San Diego Sockers in exchange for Robbie Aristodemo. The league suspended the Sockers during the season and the Milwaukee Wave claimed Cloutier in the dispersal draft. He did not move to Milwaukee, but remained in San Diego where he played for the San Diego Sockers in the Professional Arena Soccer League. In 2009, he signed with the San Diego Sockers of the Professional Arena Soccer League.

== Coaching ==
=== Youth ===
Year	Club	Team	Notable Results
2007	West Coast FC	Super Y-League	
2013	West Coast Galaxy Alliance	BU-12	
2017	West Coast FC	B2001	National Cup Finalist

=== Orange County SC ===
In February 2015, Cloutier was named as assistant coach for Orange County Blues FC under Head Coach Oliver Wyss. He continued as assistant coach when Logan Pause was announced as head coach in Jan 2017. In December 2017, Cloutier was named Head Coach for the 2017–2018 season. Cloutier was relieved of his duties as head coach after 6 years at the club, including 4 as head coach in 2021.

Year	W	D	L	Place	Result
2018	20	6	8	1st West	Conference Final
2019	15	9	10	5th West	Conference Quarterfinal
2020	7	3	6	3rd Group B	DNQ
2021	7	5	7		

=== Birmingham Legion FC ===
On February 2, 2024, Cloutier was announced as First Team Assistant Coach and USL 2 Development Director for Birmingham Legion FC.
