= Rob Kiernan =

Irish footballer

Personal information
- Full name: Robert Samuel Kiernan
- Date of birth: 13 January 1991 (age 35)
- Place of birth: Rickmansworth, England
- Height: 6 ft 1 in (1.85 m)
- Position: Defender

Youth career
- 2000–2008: Watford

Senior career*
Years	Team	Apps	(Gls)
2008–2011	Watford	2	(0)
2010	→ Kilmarnock (loan)	4	(0)
2010	→ Yeovil Town (loan)	3	(0)
2010–2011	→ Bradford City (loan)	8	(0)
2011	→ Wycombe Wanderers (loan)	2	(0)
2011–2015	Wigan Athletic	29	(1)
2012	→ Accrington Stanley (loan)	3	(0)
2012	→ Burton Albion (loan)	6	(0)
2012–2013	→ Brentford (loan)	8	(0)
2013	→ Southend United (loan)	12	(0)
2015	→ Birmingham City (loan)	12	(1)
2015–2017	Rangers	57	(1)
2017–2020	Southend United	30	(2)
2020–2022	Orange County SC	44	(2)

International career
2008	Republic of Ireland U18	3	(1)
2009–2010	Republic of Ireland U19	6	(0)
2010–2013	Republic of Ireland U21	14	(0)
- * Club domestic league appearances and goals

Robert Samuel Kiernan (born 13 January 1991) is a former professional footballer who played as a defender. Born in England, he represented the Republic of Ireland at youth level.

Kiernan has previously played for Watford, Wigan Athletic and Rangers, and has also spent time on loan at Kilmarnock, Yeovil Town, Bradford City, Wycombe Wanderers, Accrington Stanley, Burton Albion, Brentford, Southend United and Birmingham City. He ended his career with American club Orange County SC. Kiernan, who was born in Hertfordshire, played for the Republic of Ireland at youth levels up to and including under-21.

== Club career ==
=== Watford ===
Kiernan was born in Rickmansworth, Hertfordshire, and began his football career as a youngster with Watford. Watford sent two youth squads to the Milk Cup in Northern Ireland in the summer of 2008. Kiernan was moved from his natural position of central midfielder to play centre-half, to take advantage of his height and physical presence, and also captained the side. His performances drew praise from his then coach Mark Warburton.

Later that summer, Kiernan was called up by the Ireland under-19 team for a four-nation tournament, but he had to withdraw after tearing his right thigh muscle.

Kiernan captained Watford's under-18 side in 2008–09, in which they reached the quarter-finals of the FA Youth Cup. In October 2008, he, together with fellow second-year scholars Billy Gibson and Ross Jenkins, signed "developmental contracts" – professional contracts signed earlier than usual, allowing the players to continue their scholarships without the pressure of worrying about the future –to run until the end of the 2009–10 season.

When Brendan Rodgers was appointed Watford manager in November 2008, Kiernan began to take part in some first-team training sessions. He was included in the senior matchday squad for the first time on 24 January 2009 for an FA Cup fourth-round tie against Crystal Palace at Vicarage Road, and made his debut as a 90th-minute substitute, replacing Gavin Hoyte, as Watford won 4–3. Although he made no more first-team appearances that season, he finish with 17 starts for the academy side and 9 for the reserves.

==== Loans ====
After a trial in January 2010, Kiernan joined Scottish Premier League side Kilmarnock on loan; manager Jimmy Calderwood wanted him as cover with two defensive players injured. He joined Kilmarnock on the same day as Watford teammate Scott Severin, and was given the number 29 shirt. Kiernan made his debut the next day as a 73rd-minute substitute in a 1–0 league win against Celtic. Kiernan played three matches for Yeovil Town at the start of the 2010–11 season, and on 12 November joined Bradford City on a two-month loan. Conference side Histon had previously attempted to sign Kiernan on loan.

=== Wigan Athletic ===
At the end of the 2010–11 season, Kiernan rejected Watford's offer of a new two-year contract; the "slightly reduced" terms offered entitled him to leave the club without compensation becoming payable by his next employer. He signed for Premier League club Wigan Athletic, In March 2012, having failed to feature in Wigan's first team, Kiernan joined League Two Accrington Stanley on loan for the remainder of the season, but ankle ligament damage cut the loan spell to just three matches. He returned to match fitness with the help of a month's loan at Burton Albion, also of League Two, in the early part of the following season, and in November moved on to League One Brentford on loan until January 2013. He then renewed his loan deal on 11 January 2013. On 12 October 2013, Kiernan joined League Two side Southend United on a three-month loan deal, however, he was recalled on 29 December, as cover after Thomas Rogne was injured on Boxing Day. Kiernan made a strong end to the 2013–14 season, scoring his first goal for the club against Leicester City and featuring in the play-off semi-final defeat by Queens Park Rangers, and signed a three-year contract extension in May 2014.

However, after struggling to feature the following season, Kiernan joined then Championship club Birmingham City in February 2015 on loan until the end of the 2014–15 season. He made his debut on 21 February at Brighton & Hove Albion, starting the match in central midfield in place of the injured David Davis, and played 78 minutes of the 4–3 defeat. He went on to form a partnership at centre-half with Jonathan Spector, and then played alongside Michael Morrison after the latter's return from injury. Kiernan was credited with his first goal for the club on 11 April against Wolverhampton Wanderers; he scored from close range after Jonathan Grounds' shot had already crossed the line unnoticed by the officials and been pushed back into play. A hamstring injury meant he missed the last two matches of the season.

=== Rangers ===
On 22 June 2015, Kiernan signed a two-year deal at Rangers with the transfer fee reported to be £200,000. Over the course of the subsequent season, he played in central defence alongside Danny Wilson. The pair, however, received criticism for some of their performances, notably in the team's 3–2 loss to Hibernian in the 2016 Scottish Cup Final. On 19 July 2016, Kiernan extended his contract with Rangers for another year, until 2018. Kiernan scored his first goal for Rangers and only his third goal of his professional career on 10 December 2016, heading a James Tavernier free-kick to net the first of two goals as Rangers won 2–0. On 27 December 2016, he was linked with a £2m move to Fulham and the following day, during Rangers' 1–1 draw with St Johnstone, Kiernan appeared to strike Saints captain Steven Anderson. For this, Kiernan was offered a two-match suspension for violent conduct by the Scottish Football Association, however he chose to contest the charge and it was ultimately dismissed by disciplinary tribunal on 12 January.

=== Return to Southend United ===
Kiernan returned to English football in 2017, signing a three-year contract with League One club Southend United on 3 August for an undisclosed fee. Kiernan was released by Southend on 31 January 2020.

=== Orange County SC ===
On 7 February 2020, Kiernan joined USA club Orange County SC. He made 47 appearances and scored two goals before retiring from football in April 2023, due to a hip injury.

== International career ==
Kiernan has captained the Republic of Ireland national football team at age-group levels. He qualified to play for Ireland as his father was born in County Wexford.

== Career statistics ==
As of match played 29 November 2021

Appearances and goals by club, season and competition
Club	Season	League			National Cup (Note: Includes FA Cup, Scottish Cup)		League Cup (Note: Includes EFL Cup, Scottish League Cup)		Other		Total	
Club	Season	Division	Apps	Goals	Apps	Goals	Apps	Goals	Apps	Goals	Apps	Goals
Watford	2008–09	Championship	0	0	1	0	0	0	—		1	0
Watford	2009–10	Championship	0	0	0	0	0	0	—		0	0
Watford	2010–11	Championship	0	0	1	0	0	0	—		1	0
Watford	Total		0	0	2	0	0	0	—		2	0
Kilmarnock (loan)	2009–10	Scottish Premier League	4	0	1	0	—		—		5	0
Yeovil Town (loan)	2010–11	League One	3	0	—		0	0	—		3	0
Bradford City (loan)	2010–11	League Two	8	0	—		—		—		8	0
Wycombe Wanderers (loan)	2010–11	League Two	2	0	—		—		—		2	0
Wigan Athletic	2011–12	Premier League	0	0	0	0	0	0	—		0	0
Wigan Athletic	2012–13	Premier League	0	0	0	0	0	0	—		0	0
Wigan Athletic	2013–14	Championship	12	1	—		0	0	2 (Note: Appearances in Championship play-offs)	0	14	1
Wigan Athletic	2014–15	Championship	17	0	1	0	0	0	—		18	0
Wigan Athletic	Total		29	1	1	0	0	0	2	0	32	1
Accrington Stanley (loan)	2011–12	League Two	3	0	—		—		—		3	0
Burton Albion (loan)	2012–13	League Two	6	0	—		—		—		6	0
Brentford (loan)	2012–13	League One	8	0	0	0	—		1 (Note: Appearance in Football League Trophy)	0	9	0
Southend United (loan)	2013–14	League Two	12	0	2	0	—		—		14	0
Birmingham City (loan)	2014–15	Championship	12	1	—		—		—		12	1
Rangers	2015–16	Scottish Championship	33	0	5	0	3	0	4 (Note: Appearances in Scottish Challenge Cup)	0	45	0
Rangers	2016–17	Scottish Premiership	24	1	2	0	5	0	—		31	1
Rangers	Total		57	1	7	0	8	0	4	0	76	1
Southend United	2017–18	League One	1	0	0	0	1	0	0	0	2	0
Southend United	2018–19	League One	10	1	0	0	0	0	0	0	10	1
Southend United	2019–20	League One	19	1	1	0	0	0	3 (Note: Appearances in EFL Trophy)	0	23	1
Southend United	Total		30	2	1	0	1	0	3	0	35	2
Orange County SC	2020	USL Championship	15	0	0	0	—		—		15	0
Orange County SC	2021	USL Championship	28	2	0	0	—		3 (Note: Appearances in USL Championship Playoffs)	0	31	2
Orange County SC	2022	USL Championship	1	0	0	0	—		—		1	0
Orange County SC	Total		44	2	0	0	—		3	0	47	2
Career total			218	7	14	0	9	0	13	0	254	7

== Honours ==
Rangers

- Scottish Championship: 2015–16
- Scottish Challenge Cup: 2015–16

Orange County SC

- USL Championship: 2021
