= Aaron Cervantes =

American soccer player (born 2002)

Personal information
- Full name: Aaron Christopher Cervantes
- Date of birth: March 20, 2002 (age 24)
- Place of birth: Chino Hills, California, United States
- Height: 1.83 m (6 ft 0 in)
- Position: Goalkeeper

Team information
- Current team: Austin FC II
- Number: 20

Youth career
- 2015–2017: LA Galaxy
- 2017–2018: Pateadores SC
- 2020–2021: Rangers

Senior career*
Years	Team	Apps	(Gls)
2018–2020	Orange County SC	17	(0)
2021–2023	Rangers	0	(0)
2022	→ Partick Thistle (loan)	0	(0)
2023	LA Galaxy II	1	(0)
2024–2025	Austin FC II	7	(0)

International career^{‡}
2018–2019	United States U17	4	(0)
- * Club domestic league appearances and goals as of 13:28, 8 October 2024 (UTC) ‡ National team caps and goals as of 02:14, 13 October 2019 (UTC)

Aaron Christopher Cervantes (born March 20, 2002) is an American soccer player who plays as a goalkeeper for MLS Next Pro side Austin FC II. Cervantes previously played for Orange County SC of the USL Championship.

== Professional career ==
=== Orange County SC ===
Cervantes signed his first professional deal with Orange County SC on March 15, 2018, at the age of 15. He was the youngest ever player to sign a professional deal with the club. Cervantes did not make any appearances in his first season with the club. In his second season with the club, Cervantes broke into Orange County's first team, making 11 league appearances and 1 further appearance in the U.S. Open Cup. His professional debut came against New Mexico United on March 23, 2019. In between his second and third seasons with the club, Orange County and Rangers F.C. signed a partnership agreement that would result in the movement of players, due to this partnership Cervantes trained with the Glasgow side in December 2019. In his third season with the club, Cervantes made 6 appearances in a season that was cut short due to the COVID-19 pandemic. In October 2020 it was announced that Cervantes would leave Orange County for Scottish club Rangers for a deal that could rise to the high six figures.

=== Rangers ===
On October 7, 2020, it was announced that Cervantes would move to Rangers of the Scottish Premiership. It was noted that due to the surrounding issues of COVID-19 that Cervantes would train with Orange County through December and then Rangers would loan him to another European team for the latter half of the 2020–21 season.

On January 22, 2022, Cervantes joined Scottish Championship side Partick Thistle on a seven-day emergency loan deal.

=== LA Galaxy II ===
In March 2023, Cervantes returned to the United States to join MLS Next Pro club LA Galaxy II. Due to injuries, Cervantes appeared on the bench for LA Galaxy's Major League Soccer fixture against Seattle Sounders FC on April 1, 2023.

=== Austin FC II ===
In January 2024, Cervantes signed a one-year contract with Austin FC II.

== International career ==
Born in the United States, Cervantes is of Mexican descent. He is a youth international for the United States, having played for the United States U17s.

== Career statistics ==
As of October 6, 2024

Club	Season	League			National Cup		Other		Total	
Club	Season	Division	Apps	Goals	Apps	Goals	Apps	Goals	Apps	Goals
Orange County SC	2018	USL Championship	0	0	0	0	0	0	0	0
Orange County SC	2019	USL Championship	11	0	1	0	0	0	12	0
Orange County SC	2020	USL Championship	6	0	–		0	0	6	0
Orange County SC	Total		17	0	1	0	0	0	18	0
Rangers	2021–22	Scottish Premiership	0	0	0	0	0	0	0	0
Rangers	2022–23	Scottish Premiership	0	0	0	0	0	0	0	0
Rangers II (loan)	2021–22	Lowland Football League	0	0	0	0	0	0	0	0
Partick Thistle (loan)	2021–22	Scottish Championship	0	0	0	0	0	0	0	0
Partick Thistle (loan)	Total		0	0	0	0	0	0	0	0
LA Galaxy II	2023	MLS Next Pro	1	0	0	0	0	0	1	0
Austin FC II	2024	MLS Next Pro	7	0	0	0	0	0	7	0
Career total			25	0	1	0	0	0	26	0
