= Cammy Palmer =

Northern Irish professional footballer

Personal information
- Date of birth: 15 May 2000 (age 26)
- Place of birth: York, England
- Position: Central midfielder

Team information
- Current team: Livingston
- Number: 16

Youth career
- Pickering SC
- Ajax SC
- Whitby Iroquois SC
- Rangers

Senior career*
Years	Team	Apps	(Gls)
2018–2021	Rangers	0	(0)
2019	→ Partick Thistle (loan)	13	(1)
2020	→ Orange County SC (loan)	13	(2)
2020–2021	→ Clyde (loan)	3	(0)
2021–2023	Linfield	49	(4)
2023–2026	Glentoran	82	(3)
2026–	Livingston		

International career
	Scotland U17	1	(0)
2018	Northern Ireland U19	3	(1)
2019–2020	Northern Ireland U21	8	(0)
- * Club domestic league appearances and goals as of 29 April 2026

Cameron Palmer (born 15 May 2000) is a Northern Irish professional footballer who plays for Scottish Championship side Livingston

A product of the Rangers youth academy, Palmer has previously had loan spells with Partick Thistle, Orange County and Clyde.

== Club career ==
=== Early career ===
Palmer was born in York, England and raised in Toronto, Ontario, Canada. He is the son of Don Palmer, a church pastor, author, and speaker, currently residing in Edinburgh, but originally from Belfast. Cammy (Cameron) moved with his family to Canada when he was only 8 months old. He started playing competitive soccer at age 5, playing for Pickering SC, Ajax SC and eventually Whitby Iroquois SC. Whilst playing for Whitby in Ontario, former Rangers player Andy Kennedy came across the young footballer. Kennedy contacted Rangers and told them about the youngster. His family moved back to Scotland in 2011 and Palmer went on trial and very soon joined the youth ranks of the Glasgow giants. After impressing at numerous levels at the club, Palmer was named as the reserve side's team captain in 2018.

=== Professional career ===
After a solid progression at youth level for Rangers, Palmer signed a contract extension with the Ibrox side until 2021 in June 2019.

On 10 July 2019, Palmer joined Scottish Championship side Partick Thistle on loan until January 2020. Three days later Palmer made his professional footballing debut in a 1-0 win in the Scottish League Cup against Airdrieonians at Firhill. Palmer scored his first professional goal scoring for Thistle in a 3-1 away win over Inverness.

On 3 February 2020, Palmer joined USL Championship club Orange County SC on loan for the 2020 season.

Palmer was loaned to Scottish League One club Clyde in October 2020.

On 27 January 2021, Palmer joined NIFL Premiership side Linfield F.C. on an 18-month contract.

During June 2023 Palmer agreed terms with Glentoran F. C. for a one-year contract. He completed the move on 27 July 2023.

== Honours ==
Linfield

- Irish League Premiership: 2020-21
- Irish Cup: 2020-21

Glentoran

- County Antrim Shield: 2024–25
