= Carlos López (soccer, born 1996) =

American soccer player (born 1996)

Personal information
- Full name: Carlos Antonio López Cortéz
- Date of birth: 16 July 1996 (age 30)
- Place of birth: Orange County, California, United States
- Height: 1.88 m (6 ft 2 in)
- Position: Goalkeeper

Team information
- Current team: Orange County SC

Youth career
- 2011–2017: Club Tijuana

Senior career*
Years	Team	Apps	(Gls)
2017–2019	Club Tijuana	0	(0)
2017	→ Dorados (loan)	3	(0)
2019	Orange County SC	2	(0)
- * Club domestic league appearances and goals as of 23:44, 3 January 2024 (UTC)

Carlos Antonio López Cortéz (born 16 July 1996) is a Mexican footballer who plays as a goalkeeper for Orange County SC.
