= Junior Flemmings =

Jamaican footballer (born 1996)

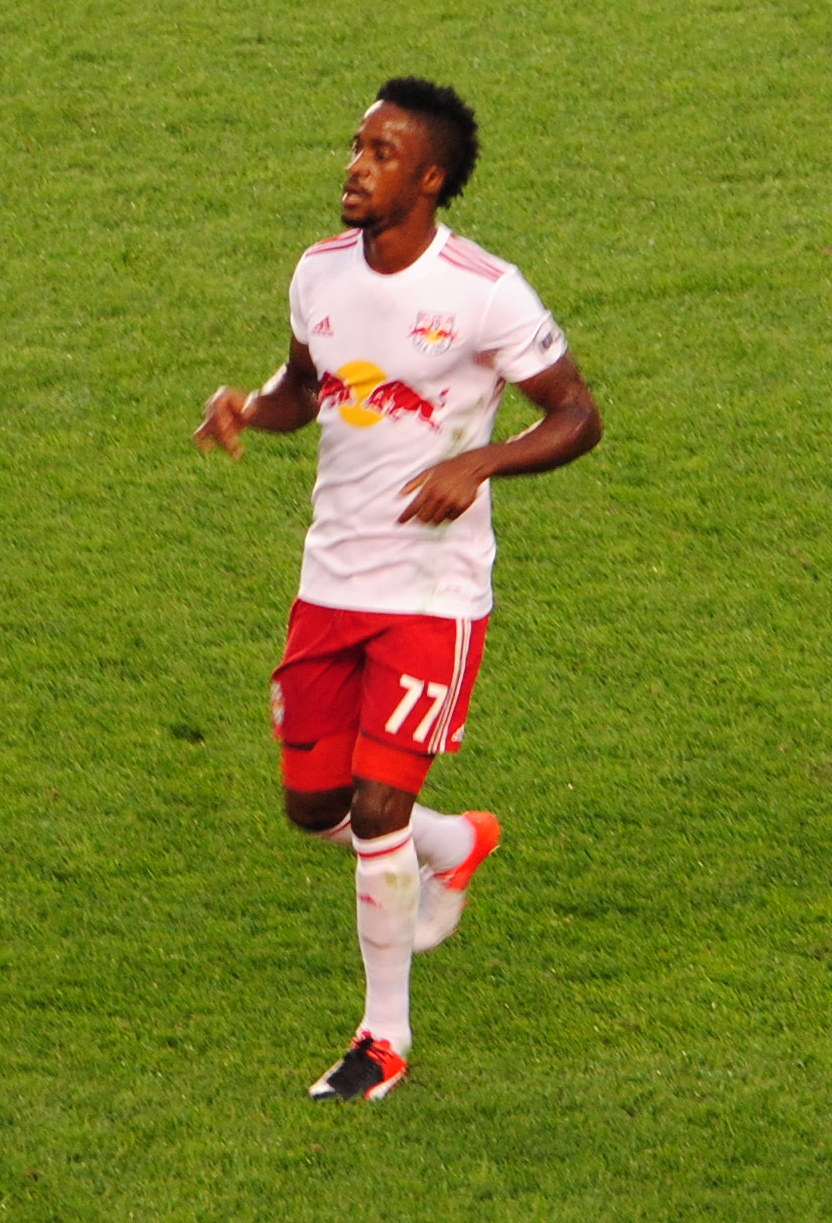
- Flemmings with the New York Red Bulls II in 2016

Personal information
- Full name: Junior Flemmings
- Date of birth: 16 January 1996 (age 30)
- Place of birth: Kingston, Jamaica
- Height: 5 ft 11 in (1.80 m)
- Positions: Winger; forward

Team information
- Current team: Ajman
- Number: 7

Youth career
- 2011: Valencia
- Tivoli Gardens

Senior career*
| Years | Team | Apps | (Gls) |
| 2013–2016 | Tivoli Gardens | 25 | (10) |
| 2016–2017 | New York Red Bulls II | 52 | (16) |
| 2018 | Tampa Bay Rowdies | 26 | (6) |
| 2019–2020 | Phoenix Rising | 43 | (29) |
| 2021 | Birmingham Legion | 21 | (6) |
| 2022–2024 | Toulouse B | 8 | (5) |
| 2022–2024 | Toulouse | 3 | (0) |
| 2023 | → Niort (loan) | 8 | (1) |
| 2023–2024 | → Voždovac (loan) | 28 | (12) |
| 2024– | Ajman | 23 | (10) |

International career^{‡}
| 2013–2014 | Jamaica U17 | 9 | (4) |
| 2015 | Jamaica U20 | 6 | (2) |
| 2017– | Jamaica | 26 | (4) |
- * Club domestic league appearances and goals as of 30 May 2025 ‡ National team caps and goals as of 7 June 2022

Junior Flemmings (born 16 January 1996) is a Jamaican professional footballer who plays as a winger and forward for UAE Pro League club Ajman and the Jamaica national team.

== Club career ==
=== Early career ===
Born in Kingston, Jamaica, Flemmings began his career in the youth ranks of Tivoli Gardens.

=== Tivoli Gardens ===
In 2013, he made his debut for the first team in the National Premier League. He was unpaid during the 2013 season with Tivoli Gardens to ensure that he wouldn't ruin his chances of playing collegiate soccer in the United States. During the 2015–2016 season Flemmings led Tivoli Gardens in scoring with eight goals, including a late game winner on 23 November 2015 which helped his club to a 2–1 victory over Boys' Town FC.

=== New York Red Bulls II ===
After months of speculation, Flemmings signed with New York Red Bulls II of the United Soccer League on 25 March 2016. On 2 April 2016, during his first appearance, Flemmings recorded his first goal and assist with the club in a 2–0 victory against Louisville City. On 22 May 2016, Flemmings scored a late match winner helping New York to a 1–0 victory against FC Montreal. On 12 August 2016, Flemmings helped New York to a 5–1 victory over Orlando City B, scoring one goal and being a constant threat throughout the match.

On 14 April 2017, Flemmings scored his first goal of the season for New York, helping the club to a 3–1 victory over Orlando City B. On 19 August 2017, Flemming scored two goals to help New York to a 4–0 victory over FC Cincinnati. On 2 September 2017, Flemmings scored one goal and assisted on another in New York's 4–2 victory over Tampa Bay Rowdies.

=== Tampa Bay Rowdies ===
In January 2018, Flemmings signed with Tampa Bay Rowdies in the USL.

=== Phoenix Rising ===
Flemmings signed with Phoenix Rising in 2019. He netted sixteen goals and seven assists in his first season with the team, and finished eighth in the league for the Golden Boot, finishing behind teammate and Golden Boot winner Solomon Asante (22 goals).

Flemmings' second season with Phoenix resulted in a Golden Boot Award, scoring 14 goals in a COVID-shortened season. Phoenix was propelled to a first-place finish in Group B.

==== Homophobia controversy ====
On 30 September 2020, while playing for the Phoenix Rising, Flemmings was accused of using a Jamaican homophobic slur, "batty boy", against the openly gay San Diego Loyal midfielder Collin Martin. The Loyal, who had been leading 3–1 up to that point, walked off the field in protest and forfeited the match. Flemmings denied using the slur and said, in a Twitter statement following the match, that he stands "in solidarity with the LGBTQ+ movement". It was the last time that Flemmings took the pitch for Phoenix Rising. The USL Championship suspended him six games for using "foul and abusive language" and fined him an undisclosed amount. In addition, Phoenix Rising team officials placed Flemmings on administrative leave for the remainder of his contract with the team, which concluded on 30 November 2020. Flemmings' contract with the team was not renewed.

The incident ultimately cost Rising a chance to host the USL Championship Final. Rising and Louisville City FC both finished with 35 points and 11 wins, but Rising had a higher goal differential and would have thus had home-field advantage had it reached the final. However, Rising was only in contention to host the final as a result of the three points it earned by forfeit. Due to the ensuing outcry, Rising announced that if it reached the final, whoever won the Eastern Conference final would have home-field advantage in the Championship Final. They were set to play the Tampa Bay Rowdies in Tampa Bay in that game, but it was canceled due to a COVID outbreak in the Rowdies organization.

=== Birmingham Legion ===
On 13 January 2021, Flemmings joined USL Championship side Birmingham Legion.

In the announcement of Flemmings joining Legion, team officials noted his history with homophobia at Phoenix Rising, but said they believe that "second chances provide opportunities for growth." Team officials also said they had "extensive conversations" with Flemmings' former coaches and teammates, in addition to Martin and Donovan for their perspective on the team signing Flemmings. Flemmings also apologized for the incident in the statement.

=== Toulouse ===
On 5 January 2022, Flemmings was transferred to Ligue 2 side Toulouse. Toulouse was promoted to Ligue 1 at the end of the 2021–22 season, but Flemmings did not make any appearances in the top tier during the first half of the 2022–23 season.

==== Loan to Niort ====
On 31 January 2023, Flemmings was loaned to Niort in Ligue 2 until the end of the 2022–23 season.

== International career ==
Flemmings has represented Jamaica at the U-20 and U-17 national team level, serving as captain of the U-17's.

He received his first full national team call up in November 2015, and was named to the 18-player match roster for Jamaica's 2018 World Cup qualifier against Panama, but was an unused substitute. Flemmings made his senior international debut versus French Guiana in the 2017 Caribbean Cup. Flemmings' scored the match-winning goal against Guadalupe in Jamaica's second group stage match of the 2021 CONCACAF Gold Cup thus qualifying them for the quarterfinals.

== Career statistics ==
=== Club ===
As of match played 14 May 2025

Appearances and goals by club, season and competition
| Club | Season | League | | | National cup | | League cup | | Other | | Total | |
| Club | Season | Division | Apps | Goals | Apps | Goals | Apps | Goals | Apps | Goals | Apps | Goals |
|---|---|---|---|---|---|---|---|---|---|---|---|---|
| New York Red Bulls II | 2016 | USL Championship | 23 | 7 | 0 | 0 | 0 | 0 | — | | 23 | 7 |
| New York Red Bulls II | 2017 | USL Championship | 29 | 9 | 0 | 0 | 3 | 1 | — | | 32 | 10 |
| New York Red Bulls II | Total | | 52 | 16 | 0 | 0 | 3 | 1 | — | | 55 | 17 |
| Tampa Bay Rowdies | 2018 | USL Championship | 26 | 6 | 1 | 0 | 0 | 0 | — | | 27 | 6 |
| Phoenix Rising | 2019 | USL Championship | 28 | 15 | 1 | 1 | 2 | 1 | — | | 31 | 17 |
| Phoenix Rising | 2020 | USL Championship | 15 | 14 | — | | 0 | 0 | — | | 15 | 14 |
| Phoenix Rising | Total | | 43 | 29 | 1 | 1 | 2 | 1 | — | | 46 | 31 |
| Birmingham Legion | 2021 | USL Championship | 21 | 6 | — | | 0 | 0 | — | | 21 | 6 |
| Toulouse B | 2021–22 | Championnat National 3 | 6 | 5 | — | | — | | — | | 6 | 5 |
| Toulouse B | 2022–23 | Championnat National 3 | 1 | 0 | — | | — | | — | | 1 | 0 |
| Toulouse B | 2023–24 | Championnat National 2 | 1 | 0 | — | | — | | — | | 1 | 0 |
| Toulouse B | Total | | 8 | 5 | — | | — | | — | | 8 | 5 |
| Toulouse | 2021–22 | Ligue 2 | 3 | 0 | 0 | 0 | — | | — | | 3 | 0 |
| Toulouse | 2022–23 | Ligue 1 | 0 | 0 | 0 | 0 | — | | — | | 0 | 0 |
| Toulouse | Total | | 3 | 0 | 0 | 0 | — | | — | | 3 | 0 |
| Niort (loan) | 2022–23 | Ligue 2 | 8 | 1 | 0 | 0 | — | | — | | 8 | 1 |
| Voždovac (loan) | 2023–24 | Serbian SuperLiga | 28 | 12 | 3 | 3 | — | | — | | 31 | 15 |
| Career total | | | 189 | 75 | 5 | 4 | 5 | 2 | 0 | 0 | 199 | 81 |

=== International ===
Scores and results list Jamaica's goal tally first, score column indicates score after each Flemmings goal.

List of international goals scored by Junior Flemmings
| No. | Date | Venue | Opponent | Score | Result | Competition |
|---|---|---|---|---|---|---|
| 1 | 15 October 2019 | Ergilio Hato Stadium, Willemstad, Curaçao | Aruba | 5–0 | 6–0 | 2019–20 CONCACAF Nations League B |
| 2 | 16 July 2021 | Exploria Stadium, Orlando, United States | Guadeloupe | 2–1 | 2–1 | 2021 CONCACAF Gold Cup |
| 3 | 4 June 2022 | Dr. Ir. Franklin Essed Stadion, Paramaribo, Suriname | Suriname | 1–0 | 1–1 | 2022–23 CONCACAF Nations League A |

== Honors ==
New York Red Bulls II

- USL Cup: 2016
- USL Regular Season: 2016

Phoenix Rising

- USL Championship Regular Season: 2019
- Western Conference
  - Winners (Regular Season): 2019
  - Winners (Playoffs): 2020

Jamaica

- Caribbean Cup runner-up: 2017

Toulouse

- Ligue 2: 2021–22

Individual

- RSPL Young Player of the Season: 2015–16
- USL Championship Golden Boot Winner: 2020
