= Aodhan Quinn =

American soccer player (born 1992)

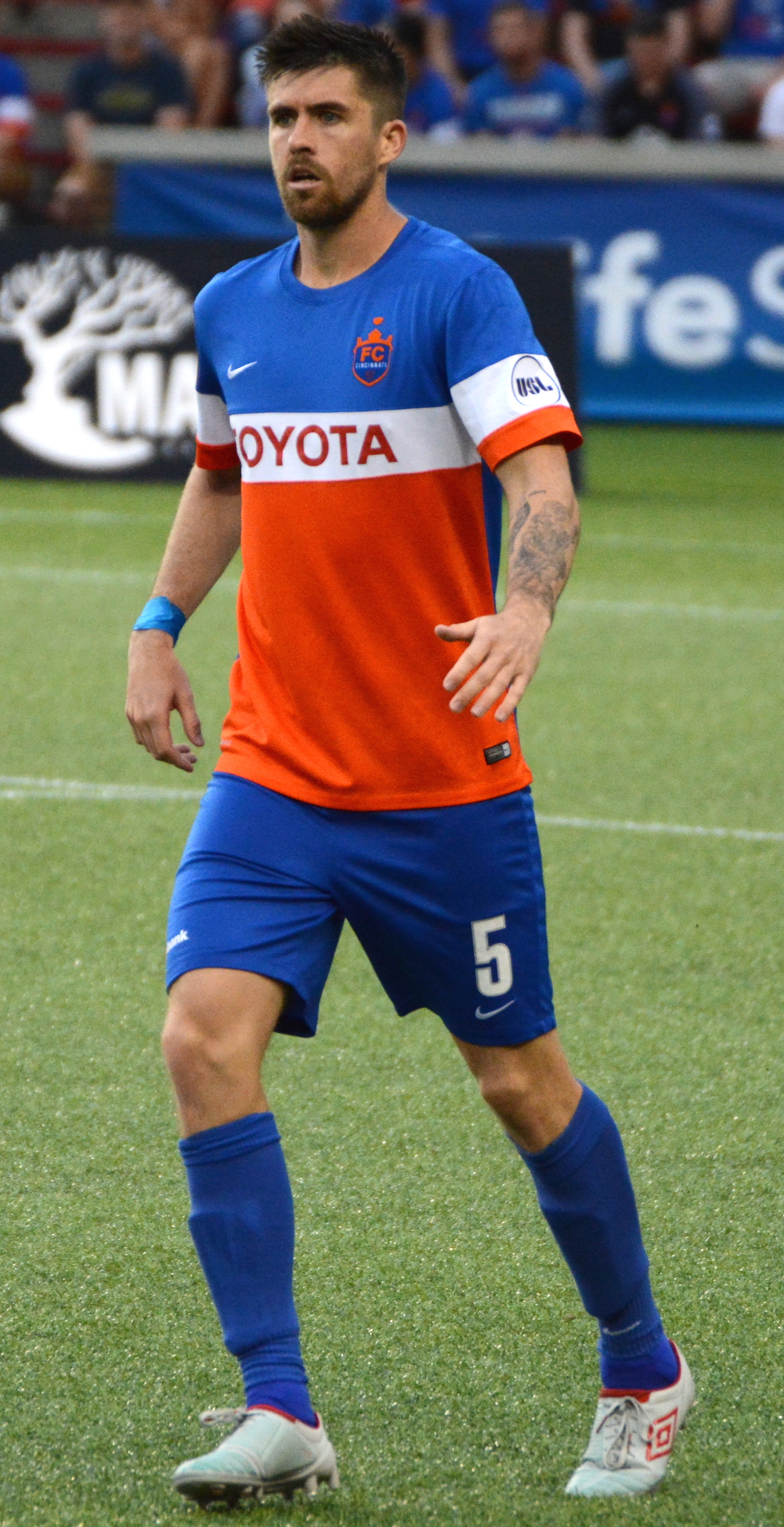
- Quinn playing for FC Cincinnati in 2017

Personal information
- Date of birth: March 22, 1992 (age 34)
- Place of birth: San Diego, California, U.S.
- Height: 1.83 m (6 ft 0 in)
- Position: Midfielder

Team information
- Current team: Indy Eleven
- Number: 14

College career
Years	Team	Apps	(Gls)
2010	Bradley Braves		
2011–2013	Akron Zips		

Senior career*
Years	Team	Apps	(Gls)
2011	Akron Summit Assault	11	(2)
2012–2013	Seattle Sounders FC U-23	26	(8)
2014	Orlando City	16	(0)
2015–2016	Louisville City	49	(5)
2017	FC Cincinnati	14	(3)
2017–2020	Orange County SC	82	(23)
2021–2022	Phoenix Rising	61	(15)
2023–	Indy Eleven	112	(12)
- * Club domestic league appearances and goals as of November 6, 2026

Aodhan Quinn (born March 22, 1992) is an American professional soccer player who currently plays for Indy Eleven in the USL Championship.

== Career ==
=== Early career ===
Quinn played college soccer at Bradley University in 2010 and at the University of Akron between 2011 and 2013. During his time at college Quinn also played for USL PDL clubs Akron Summit Assault during their 2011 season, and Seattle Sounders FC U-23 during their 2012 and 2013 seasons.

=== Professional ===
Quinn was selected by Philadelphia Union in the third round of the 2014 MLS SuperDraft (52nd overall), but wasn't signed by the club. Quinn later signed with USL Pro club Orlando City on March 19, 2014. He was released upon the conclusion of the 2014 season, a casualty of the club's transition to Major League Soccer.

Quinn signed with Louisville City on May 11, 2015.

In January 2017 it was announced that Quinn was leaving Louisville City FC to play for FC Cincinnati. Following the close of the 2017 season, FC Cincinnati announced they would not exercise the option to have Quinn return in 2018.

Quinn joined Orange County SC on December 15, 2017.

Quinn signed with Phoenix Rising FC on December 3, 2020. He scored a goal on his league debut in a 4–1 win over San Diego Loyal on April 30, 2021.

On January 19, 2023, Quinn transferred to Indy Eleven. He made his first appearance of the 2024 season after a season-ending injury in 2023 on August 2, replacing midfielder Ben Mines at halftime in a 5–0 away loss to Charleston Battery in the USL Championship. Quinn scored the team's first goal in their 3–2 loss to Rhode Island FC in the USL Championship playoffs on November 3. Quinn ended the season with 14 total appearances, including the team's historic semifinal appearance in the U.S. Open Cup. On November 20 2024, Indy Eleven announced that Quinn would remain with the club for a third consecutive season. Quinn scored his 10th goal for Indy Eleven on March 15, 2025, in the team's season-opening 3–1 away victory over Miami FC followed by another on March 29 in a 2–3 home loss against Colorado Springs Switchbacks.

== Personal life ==
Quinn is the son of the former Everton player and United States international Brian Quinn.

Quinn is a 2010 graduate of Mt. Carmel High School in San Diego, California.

== Career statistics ==
=== Club ===
As of match played 18 October 2025.

Appearances and goals by club, season and competition
Club	Season	League			Playoffs		National cup (Note: Includes U.S. Open Cup)		League cup (Note: Includes USL Cup)		Total	
Club	Season	Division	Apps	Goals	Apps	Goals	Apps	Goals	Apps	Goals	Apps	Goals
Orlando City SC	2014	USL Pro	16	0	0	0	0	0	–		16	0
Orlando City SC	Total		16	0	0	0	0	0	–		16	0
Louisville City FC	2015	USL	21	2	2	0	2	0	–		25	2
Louisville City FC	2016	USL	28	3	3	0	1	0	–		32	3
Louisville City FC	Total		49	5	5	0	3	0	–		57	5
FC Cincinnati	2017	USL	14	3	1	0	2	0	–		17	3
FC Cincinnati	Total		14	3	1	0	2	0	–		17	3
Orange County SC	2018	USL	34	11	3	1	1	0	–		38	12
Orange County SC	2019	USL Championship	32	8	1	0	1	0	–		34	8
Orange County SC	2020	USL Championship	16	4	0	0	Cancelled		–		16	4
Orange County SC	Total		82	23	4	1	2	0	–		88	24
Phoenix Rising FC	2021	USL Championship	30	6	1	0	Cancelled		–		32	6
Phoenix Rising FC	2022	USL Championship	31	9	0	0	2	0	–		33	9
Phoenix Rising FC	Total		61	15	1	0	2	0	–		65	15
Indy Eleven	2023	USL Championship	28	9	0	0	2	0	–		30	9
Indy Eleven	2024	USL Championship	11	0	1	1	1	0	–		13	1
Indy Eleven	2025	USL Championship	28	3	0	0	1	0	5	1	34	4
Indy Eleven	Total		67	12	1	1	4	0	5	1	77	14
Career total			289	58	12	2	13	0	5	1	320	61

== Honors ==
=== Club ===
==== Orlando City ====
- USL Pro: 2014

==== Phoenix Rising ====
- USL Championship - Western Conference: 2021

=== Individual ===
- USL Championship Golden Playmaker: 2025
- USL Championship All-League First Team: 2018, 2021
- USL Championship All-League Second Team: 2025
