= Frederik Due (footballer) =

Danish footballer (born 1992)

Personal information
- Date of birth: 18 July 1992 (age 34)
- Place of birth: Køge, Denmark
- Height: 1.87 m (6 ft 2 in)
- Position: Goalkeeper

Youth career
- Køge BK
- Herfølge Boldklub
- HB Køge

Senior career*
Years	Team	Apps	(Gls)
2010–2016	HB Køge	99	(0)
2016–2018	Randers	4	(0)
2019	Hartford Athletic	15	(0)
2019–2021	Orange County SC	21	(0)
2021	Sandefjord	0	(0)
- * Club domestic league appearances and goals as of 4 October 2020

Frederik Due (born 18 July 1992) is a Danish professional footballer who last played as a goalkeeper for Eliteserien club Sandefjord.

== Professional ==
Due played in his native Denmark from 2010 to 2018 for HB Køge and Randers.

On 23 January 2019, Due joined Hartford Athletic in the American USL Championship, becoming the fifth Dane to join the first-year team led by Danish head coach Jimmy Nielsen. Due was injured in pre season camp and did not make his debut with the team until 25 May when he started against the Ottawa Fury FC. He was transferd to Orange County SC on 21 August 2019 having made 15 starts for Hartford including the team's first ever clean sheet and first win at their home park of Dillon Stadium. He started Orange County's playoff game and was re signed for the 2020 season 6 December 2019.

Due moved to Norwegian first division club Sandefjord in early 2021.
