= Francis Jacobs (soccer) =

American soccer player (born 2005)

Personal information
- Date of birth: February 28, 2005 (age 21)
- Place of birth: Laguna Beach, California, United States
- Height: 6 ft 0 in (1.83 m)
- Position: Midfielder

Youth career
- 2016–2019: Irvine Strikers

Senior career*
Years	Team	Apps	(Gls)
2019–2022	Orange County	3	(0)
2022	→ California United Strikers (loan)	1	(0)

International career
2019	United States U15	3	(1)
- * Club domestic league appearances and goals as of October 15, 2022

Francis Jacobs (born February 28, 2005) is an American professional soccer player who last played for USL Championship side Orange County.

He became the youngest professional US soccer player in history on July 26, 2019, when he signed with Orange County Soccer Club at 14 years, four months, and 29 days old. Beforehand, Freddy Adu was the youngest professional US soccer player in history.

== Club career ==
After playing with USSDA side Irvine Strikers, Jacobs signed with USL Championship side Orange County on August 12, 2019. At just 14 years, 4 months and 29 days old, Jacobs became the youngest professional soccer player in United States history.

== Career statistics ==
=== Club ===
As of match played October 6, 2020

Appearances and goals by club, season and competition
Club	Season	League			Cup		Continental		Total	
Club	Season	Division	Apps	Goals	Apps	Goals	Apps	Goals	Apps	Goals
Orange County SC	2020	USL Championship	2	0	—	—	—	—	2	0
Orange County SC	2021	USL Championship	1	0	—	—	—	—	1	0
Orange County SC	2022	USL Championship	0	0	0	0	0	0	0	0
California United Strikers (loan)	2022	NISA	1	0	0	0	—	—	1	0
Career total			4	0	0	0	0	0	4	0
