= Harry Forrester (footballer) =

Retired English footballer (born 1991)

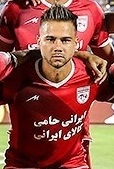
- Forrester with Tractor in 2018

Personal information
- Full name: Harry Lee Forrester
- Date of birth: 2 January 1991 (age 35)
- Place of birth: Milton Keynes, England
- Height: 5 ft 10 in (1.79 m)
- Position: Attacking midfielder

Youth career
- –2000: Northampton Town
- 2000–2007: Watford
- 2007–2010: Aston Villa

Senior career*
Years	Team	Apps	(Gls)
2010–2011	Aston Villa	0	(0)
2010–2011	→ Kilmarnock (loan)	10	(0)
2011–2013	Brentford	55	(8)
2013–2016	Doncaster Rovers	54	(8)
2016–2018	Rangers	32	(7)
2017–2018	→ AFC Wimbledon (loan)	36	(3)
2018–2019	Tractor	2	(0)
2018–2019	→ Machine Sazi (loan)	0	(0)
2019–2020	Orange County SC	35	(3)
2022	Los Angeles Force	4	(0)
Total		228	(29)

International career
2006–2007	England U16	5	(0)
2007–2008	England U17	4	(0)
- * Club domestic league appearances and goals as of 23:30, 6 February 2021 (UTC)

Harry Lee Forrester (born 2 January 1991) is an English football coach and former professional footballer who played as an attacking midfielder.

Although primarily an attacking midfielder, he was deployed in a number of positions including on the left wing. He came through the youth teams of Watford and Aston Villa and would later play in the Scottish Premiership for Rangers and Kilmarnock in the Football League for Brentford, Doncaster Rovers and AFC Wimbledon. He spent the final five years of his career playing in Iran and the United States for Tractor, Machine Sazi, Orange County SC and Los Angeles Force.

He was capped at youth level at England U16 and U17 level with a combined 9 caps. He now resides in California and runs a soccer academy.

== Club career ==
=== Watford ===
In 2000, Forrester joined Watford from Northampton Town. As Forrester was only ten years old, Watford paid Northampton £13,000 in compensation.

=== Aston Villa ===
In summer 2007, Aston Villa signed Forrester from Watford, despite reported interest from the likes of Tottenham Hotspur and Manchester United for the highly rated teen. A transfer tribunal ruled in December 2007, on the compensation due to Watford as Forrester was only 16-years-old at the time he signed for Villa. An initial fee of £250,000 was set which could have potentially risen to £1.2 million as well as a percentage of the sell-on fee. After joining, he immediately helped Villa's under-18 team to FA Premier Academy League glory in the 2007–08 season. He also started for Villa's reserve team who in the 2009–10 season, won the Reserve League South title for a third consecutive time. However, he was an unused sub as Villa went on to lose the Play-off Final against Manchester United, champions of the Reserve League North. He was released by Villa in May 2011 after his contract expired.

==== Kilmarnock (loan) ====
In August 2010, Forrester signed on loan with Scottish Premier League club Kilmarnock. He made his Scottish Premier League debut in the 2–1 win against St Mirren on 11 September. Forrester claimed his first assist in a 2–1 loss to Inverness Caledonian Thistle on 23 October, crossing to Rui Miguel who scored with a header. He played a total of eight games in all competitions for Kilmarnock, before returning to Aston Villa in January 2011.

=== Brentford ===
Despite being released by Aston Villa, there was still much speculation surrounding Forrester's future, with reported interest from Championship side Barnsley and Dutch champions Ajax. Forrester later joined up with the latter on trial, playing with their reserve side Jong Ajax, and received praise from manager Frank de Boer. He scored a hat-trick for Jong Ajax in a 5–2 pre-season victory over VV GOES on 27 July 2011.

Forrester then decided to turn down a move to Ajax to join League One club Brentford, managed by Uwe Rösler, on 4 August 2011 on a two-year contract. He made his Bees debut as an injury time substitute in the 2–1 win at Exeter City on 16 August 2011. On 30 August, he started his first game for Brentford in a 3–3 draw against Milton Keynes Dons in the first round of the Football League Trophy before being replaced by Sam Wood after 78 minutes. On 27 January 2013, Forrester earned his side a 2–2 draw and a replay against Chelsea in the fourth round of the FA Cup by converting a penalty won by Tom Adeyemi in the 73rd minute.

=== Doncaster Rovers ===
On 30 June 2013, Forrester left Brentford after his contract expired, opting instead to sign for newly promoted Championship club Doncaster Rovers. On 4 January 2014, Forrester scored his first goal for Rovers in an FA Cup third round defeat at home to Stevenage. A series of injuries restricted Forrester to just 9 appearances (seven in the League) during the 2013–14 season, of which just three were starts.

On 8 August 2015, Forrester scored a controversial goal for Rovers against Bury on the opening day of the 2015–16 season, in injury-time, after the referee ordered the ball to be passed back to the Bury keeper to restart play, Forrester accidentally volleyed the ball into Bury's goal. Doncaster manager Paul Dickov ordered his team to let Bury score an equaliser from the restart of play with Bury striker Leon Clarke allowed to walk the ball into the Doncaster goal to level the match at 1–1.

=== Rangers ===
On 31 December 2015, Forrester signed for Rangers on an initial six-month deal. Forrester said that it was a privilege to join 'one of the biggest teams in Europe' and that he wanted to stay longer than his initial six-month deal. Harry also said that he wanted to develop further as a player by learning from the more experienced players at the club, for example Lee Wallace and Kenny Miller. Forrester made his debut for Rangers on 10 January 2016 in a 5–1 win over Cowdenbeath in the Scottish Cup. On 27 February, Forrester scored his first goal for the club, netting the winner with four minutes remaining in a 1–0 league victory over St Mirren after coming on as a substitute. On 10 April while playing in the 2016 Scottish Challenge Cup Final against Peterhead, Forrester was substituted because of injury and limped off the park, it was revealed later he had suffered a hairline fracture which ultimately ended his season. However, two days later, on 12 April, he signed a new three-year contract with Rangers. On 13 June 2017, Forrester was told to stay away from training and to find a new club by Pedro Caixinha.

=== Tractor ===
In July 2018, Forrester's contract with Rangers was cancelled by mutual consent and he joined Iranian club Tractor, signing a two-year contract.

On 30 August 2018, after two appearances for Tractor, Forrester joined Tabriz rivals Machine Sazi on loan.

=== Move to the United States ===
On 18 January 2019, it was announced that Forrester was signed by USL Championship side Orange County SC ahead of the 2019 season.

During the 2022 season, Forrester was playing for NISA side Los Angeles Force.

== Coaching career ==
Forrester announced his retirement in January 2022. Forrester owns and works for football coaching company Prospect Soccer Academy, based in California. The company provides off-season 1-to-1 training for professional players, amongst other facilities.

== Career statistics ==
As of match played 26 August 2019

Appearances and goals by club, season and competition
Club	Season	League			National Cup		League Cup		Other		Total	
Club	Season	Division	Apps	Goals	Apps	Goals	Apps	Goals	Apps	Goals	Apps	Goals
Kilmarnock (loan)	2010–11	Scottish Premier League	7	0	—		1	0	—		8	0
Brentford	2011–12	League One	19	0	0	0	0	0	1 (Note: Appearances in EFL Trophy)	0	20	0
Brentford	2012–13	League One	36	8	7	3	1	0	5 (Note: 3 appearances in League One play-offs, 2 appearances in EFL Trophy)	0	49	11
Brentford	Total		55	8	7	3	3	1	6	0	69	11
Doncaster Rovers	2013–14	Championship	7	0	1	1	1	0	—		9	1
Doncaster Rovers	2014–15	League One	40	7	4	0	2	1	2	1	48	9
Doncaster Rovers	2015–16	League One	7	1	0	0	1	0	1	0	9	1
Doncaster Rovers	Total		54	8	5	1	4	1	3	1	66	11
Rangers	2015–16	Scottish Championship	11	4	4	1	—		1 (Note: Appearance in Scottish Challenge Cup)	0	16	5
Rangers	2016–17	Scottish Premiership	21	3	1	0	6	0	—		28	3
Rangers	Total		32	7	5	1	6	0	1	0	44	8
AFC Wimbledon (loan)	2017–18	League One	36	3	3	0	—		4	0	43	3
Tractor	2018–19	Persian Gulf Pro League	2	0	—		—		—		2	0
Machine Sazi (loan)	2018–19	Persian Gulf Pro League	0	0	0	0	—		—		0	0
Orange County SC	2019	USL Championship	31	3	1	0	—		—		32	3
Orange County SC	2020	USL Championship	4	0	0	0	—		—		4	0
Orange County SC	Total		35	3	1	0	0	0	0	0	36	3
Career total			221	29	21	5	14	1	14	1	270	36

== Honours ==
Rangers

- Scottish Championship: 2015–16
- Scottish Challenge Cup: 2015–16
