= Oliver Wyss =

Footballer (born 1974)

Personal information
- Date of birth: August 29, 1974 (age 52)
- Place of birth: Solothurn, Switzerland

Youth career
- FC Solothurn

Senior career*
Years	Team	Apps	(Gls)
1989–1994	FC Solothurn		
1994–1995	Los Angeles Salsa (USISL Pro)		
1996–1997	Anaheim Splash (CISL)		

International career
1989–1994	Switzerland (Youth)		

Managerial career
- 2014–2016: Orange County Blues
- * Club domestic league appearances and goals as of USL

Oliver Wyss (born August 29, 1974) is the current Chairman and Chief Soccer Officer of USL Championship club Monterey Bay FC. Previously he was the Head of Global Football Development and Sporting Director at the United Soccer League (USL) as well as President of Soccer Operations and General Manager for Orange County SC.

== Biography ==
Wyss was born in Solothurn, Switzerland. Wyss started his playing career at F.C. Solothurn and made more than 20 international appearances for the Swiss Youth National Team, including in the European Cup qualifiers. Oliver was a Technical Advisor on the soccer film, Playing for Keeps. His father was a professional soccer player.

After nine years as sporting director for Orange County SC, Wyss left his position in 2023 to join the United Soccer League as Head of Global Football Development and Sporting Director. After two years working at the league level, Wyss returned to the USL Championship to become Monterey Bay FC's Chairman and Chief Soccer Officer in November of 2025.
