= Owusu-Ansah Kontoh =

Ghanaian footballer (born 1993)

Personal information
- Full name: Owusu-Ansah Kontoh
- Date of birth: 24 August 1993 (age 33)
- Place of birth: Kumasi, Ghana
- Height: 1.80 m (5 ft 11 in)
- Positions: Left full-back; winger

Youth career
- 2006–2011: Asante Kotoko

Senior career*
| Years | Team | Apps | (Gls) |
| 2011–2015 | Metalac Gornji Milanovac | 81 | (3) |
| 2016 | Novi Pazar | 2 | (0) |
| 2016–2018 | AEL | 19 | (0) |
| 2018–2019 | Orange County SC | 40 | (0) |
| 2019–2020 | Phoenix Rising | 6 | (0) |
- * Club domestic league appearances and goals as of 23 August 2020

Owusu-Ansah Kontoh (born 24 August 1993 in Kumasi) is a Ghanaian footballer who plays as a defender.

== Career ==
=== Asante Kotoko ===
He made his first steps as part of Ghana Premier League club Asante Kotoko Coached by Serbian manager Bogdan Korak, during the summer of 2011, the team came on a tour to Serbia to play a series of friendlies and to try to impress clubs and scouts in Europe.

=== Metalac Gornji Milanovac ===
Kwame Boateng and Owusu-Ansah Kontoh finally stayed in Serbia and joined Metalac Gornji Milanovac a club playing in the Serbian SuperLiga. He made his debut in official matches on September 20, 2011, in a 2011–12 Serbian Cup match against FK Srem, making his league debut 4 days later in a round 6 match against FK BSK Borča.

=== Novi Pazar ===
After his contract with Metalac Gornji Milanovac expired on 30 June 2015, Ansah remained a free agent until January 2016 when he joined Serbian SuperLiga team Novi Pazar. However, he only remained with Novi Pazar for six months.

=== AEL ===
In July 2016, Owusu was tested by the Greek Superleague team AEL. He made a good appearance in his debut on the friendly match against Levadiakos and resulted being offered a contract which he accepted. During the game, he surprised AEL fans with his powerful throw in and his excellent ball handling.

=== Orange County ===
During the winter-break of 2017–18 he moved to the United States and joined USL Championship side Orange County SC.

=== Phoenix Rising ===
Kontoh signed with Phoenix Rising FC on December 5, 2019.
