= Daniel Crisostomo =

American soccer player (born 1997)

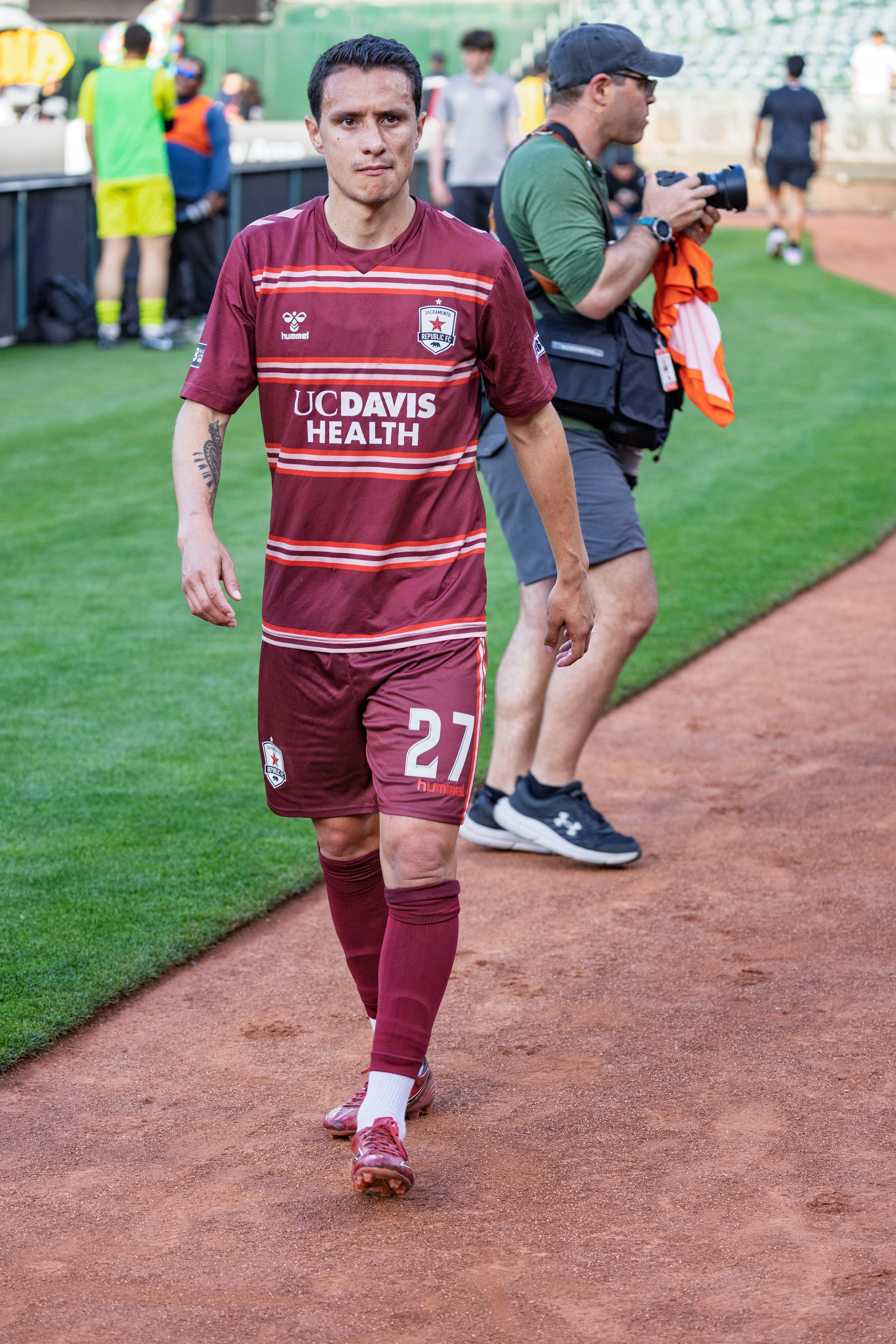
- Crisostomo with the Sacramento Republic in 2026

Personal information
- Date of birth: January 16, 1997 (age 29)
- Place of birth: San Francisco, California, United States
- Height: 5 ft 9 in (1.75 m)
- Position: Midfielder

Team information
- Current team: Sacramento Republic FC
- Number: 27

Youth career
- 2010: Los Angeles FC Chelsea
- 2011: Cosmos Academy West
- 2012: Chivas USA
- 2013: LA Galaxy
- 2014: FC Golden State Force

College career
Years	Team	Apps	(Gls)
2015–2018	UC Irvine Anteaters	74	(3)

Senior career*
Years	Team	Apps	(Gls)
2016	FC Golden State Force	3	(0)
2017	Orange County FC		
2019–2020	Orange County SC	42	(1)
2021	Las Vegas Lights	16	(1)
2021	Los Angeles FC	10	(0)
2022	Las Vegas Lights	33	(2)
2022	→ Los Angeles FC (loan)	2	(0)
2023	Los Angeles FC	6	(0)
2023	Los Angeles FC 2	6	(0)
2024–2025	Tampa Bay Rowdies	59	(3)
2026–	Sacramento Republic FC	27	(0)
- * Club domestic league appearances and goals as of October 31, 2026

Daniel Crisostomo (Spanish: Crisóstomo; born January 16, 1997) is an American professional soccer player who plays as a midfielder for USL Championship club Sacramento Republic FC.

== Playing career ==
=== College and amateur ===
Raised in Fontana, California, Crisostomo played four years of college soccer at University of California, Irvine between 2015 and 2018.

While at college, Crisostomo also appeared for USL Premier Development League side FC Golden State Force in 2016, and National Premier Soccer League side Orange County FC in 2017.

=== Professional ===
On March 1, 2019, Crisostomo signed with USL Championship side Orange County SC.

On April 5, 2021, Crisostomo joined Las Vegas Lights ahead of the 2021 season.

On August 4, 2021, Crisostomo joined Los Angeles FC for the 2021 season with the option to extend to 2024. Crisostomo was released by Los Angeles following the 2021 season.

On February 4, 2022, Crisostomo re-signed with Las Vegas Lights ahead of their 2022 season.

On May 21, 2022, Crisostomo returned to Los Angeles FC on a 4-day loan.

On January 26, 2023, Crisostomo returned once again to Los Angeles FC, this time signing a one-year contract along with former Las Vegas Lights teammate Abraham Romero.

Following his release from LAFC, Crisostomo joined USL Championship side Tampa Bay Rowdies ahead of their 2024 season.

== Personal life ==
Born in the United States, Crisostomo is of Peruvian descent.
