= Kevin Alston =

American soccer player (born 1988)

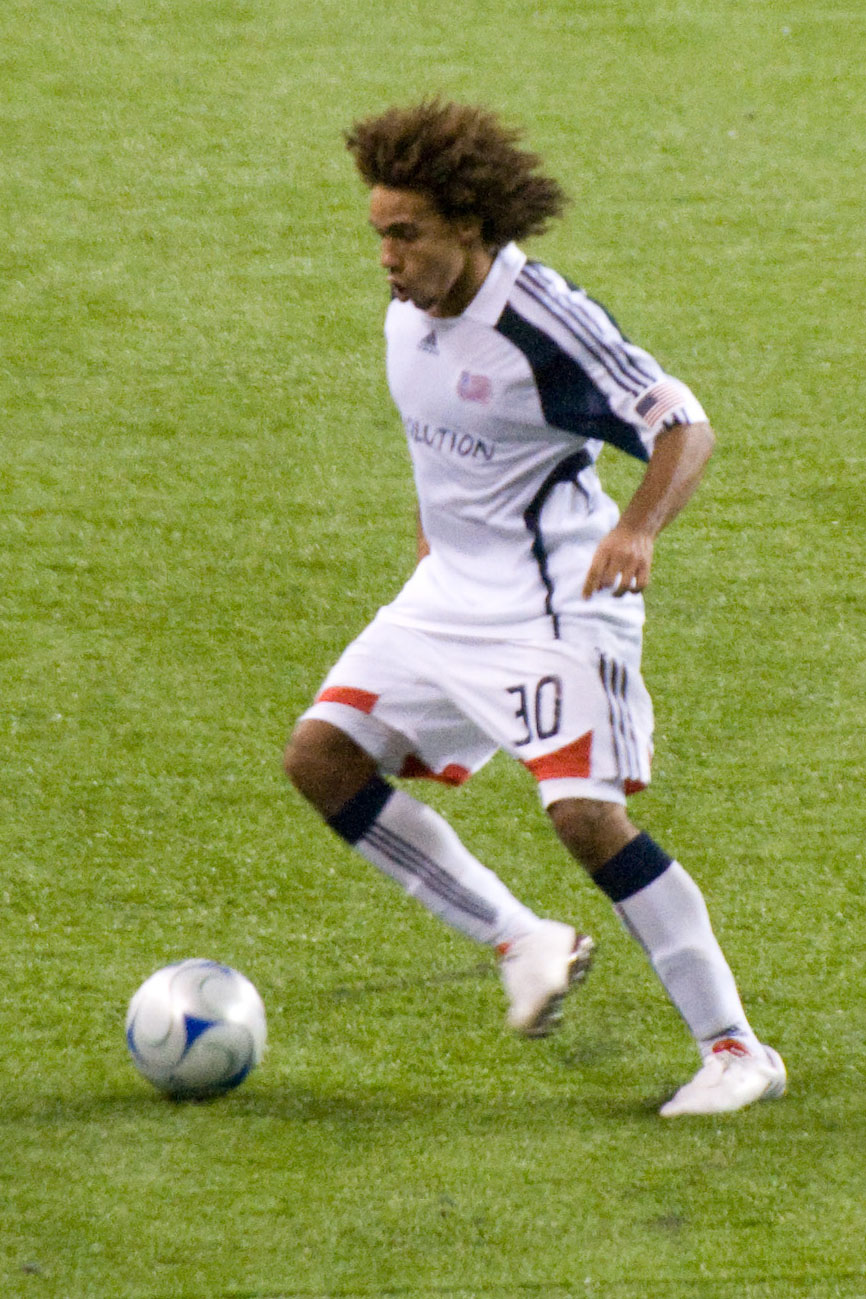
- Alston with the New England Revolution in 2009

Personal information
- Full name: Kevin Lawrence Alston
- Date of birth: May 5, 1988 (age 38)
- Place of birth: Washington, D.C., U.S.
- Height: 5 ft 8 in (1.73 m)
- Position: Defender

Youth career
- 2003–2006: Potomac Soccer Association

College career
Years	Team	Apps	(Gls)
2006–2008	Indiana Hoosiers		

Senior career*
Years	Team	Apps	(Gls)
2009–2015	New England Revolution	148	(1)
2016–2017	Orlando City	24	(0)
2017	→ Orlando City B (loan)	12	(0)
2018–2021	Orange County SC	75	(1)
Total		259	(2)

International career^{‡}
2003–2005	United States U17	17	(0)
2007	United States U18	3	(0)
- * Club domestic league appearances and goals as of November 8, 2021 ‡ National team caps and goals as of October 26, 2012

Kevin Lawrence Alston (born May 5, 1988) is an American former professional soccer player.

== Club career ==
Alston played college soccer for the Indiana University Hoosiers, where he was a two-time All-Big Ten selection in 2007 and 2008, and a 2008 NSCAA All-Great Lakes region selection.

=== New England Revolution ===
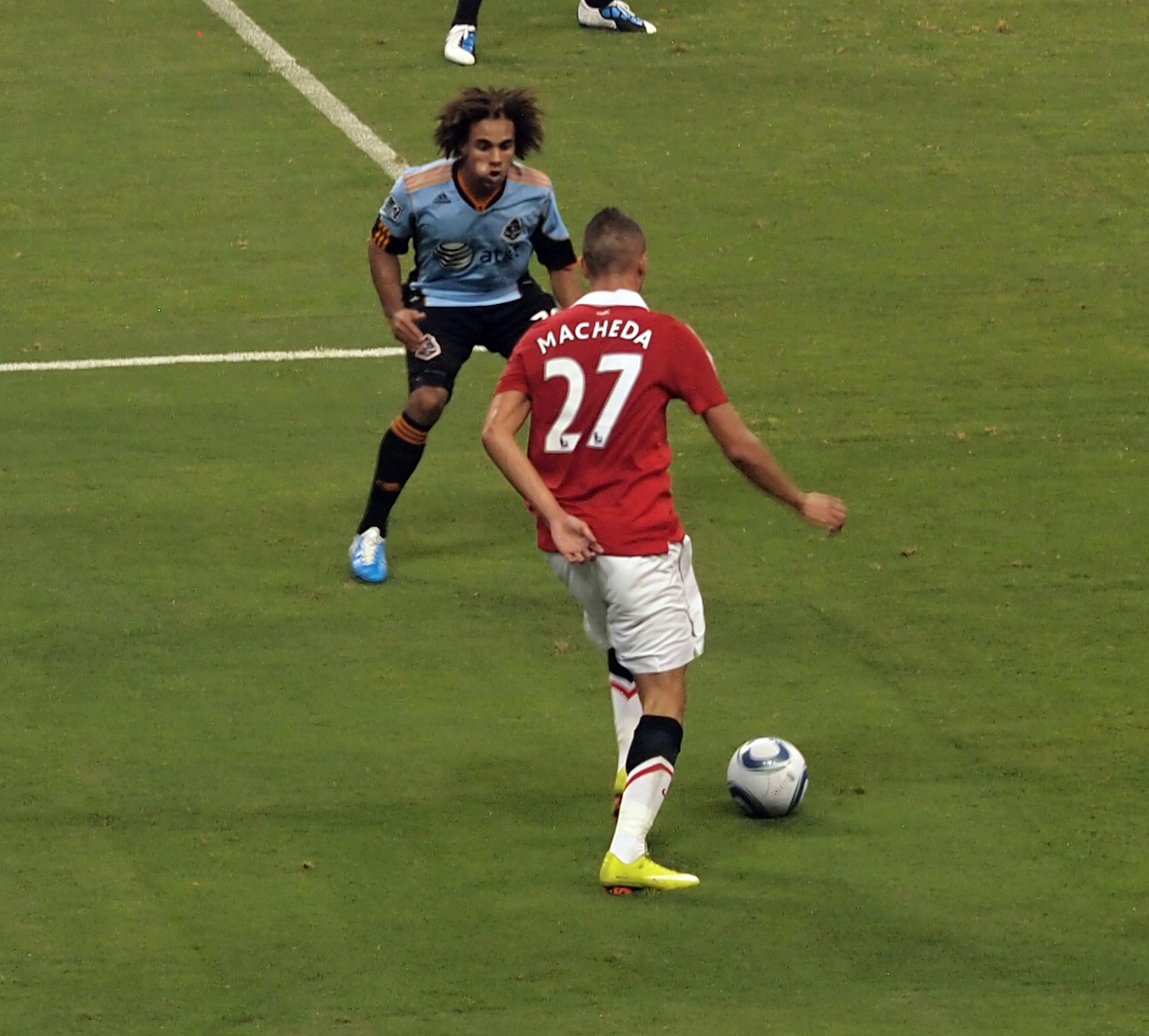
Alston defending against Manchester United's Federico Macheda during the 2010 MLS All-Star Game

Alston was drafted in the first round (10th overall) of the 2009 MLS SuperDraft by New England Revolution after signing a Generation Adidas contract with Major League Soccer. He made his professional debut on March 21, 2009, in New England's first game of the 2009 MLS season against the San Jose Earthquakes. Alston was selected to his first Major League Soccer All-Star Game during the 2010 season and was in the starting lineup for the match in Houston against Manchester United.

Alston scored his first professional goal in the final of SuperLiga 2010, but the Revolution lost 2–1 to Monarcas Morelia of Mexico. Alston scored his first league goal April 12, 2014 at home against the Houston Dynamo.

Alston scored his first Major League Soccer goal on April 12, 2014, in 2–0 victory against Houston Dynamo.

=== Orlando City ===
Alston's contract option was declined by New England at the end of the 2015 MLS season, and he was selected by Orlando City in the 2nd phase of the MLS Re-Entry Draft. Alston played for Orlando City from 2016-2017.

=== Orange County SC ===
On June 8, 2018, Alston joined USL Championship side Orange County SC. On November 28, 2021 in his final professional game, Alston won the USL Championship Final in Orange County SC's 3-1 win over the Tampa Bay Rowdies.

== International career ==
Alston was a member of U.S. Soccer's Residency Program and the Under-17 National Team from September 2003 through his enrollment at Indiana in January 2006. He appeared in 76 matches while at the Residency Program, starting 51 and recording one goal and three assists. He earned 17 caps as a member of the U-17 National Team, including three starts at the 2005 FIFA U-17 World Championship in Peru. He also represented the U.S. at the Pan American Games in Brazil in the summer of 2007.

On December 22, 2009, Alston received his first call up to train with the senior U.S. national team in preparation for a January friendly match against Honduras, however, he suffered a hamstring injury in training and was unable to participate. Alston was called up for the following friendly against El Salvador, but again had to pull out after a recurrence of the hamstring injury. He has yet to make his senior national team debut.

== Personal life ==
Kevin Alston is the son of Jeanne Fox-Alston and Larry Alston. He has one older brother, Kenneth, who is a University of Virginia graduate and holds an MBA from the Stanford Graduate School of Business. Alston grew up in Silver Spring, Maryland where he attended Woodlin Elementary School. Alston majored in management at Indiana. He enjoys hip-hop and R&B and counts Lil' Wayne among his favorite musical artists. His favorite movies Gladiator, Man on Fire, Act of Valor and many others. Alston's grandfather Richard K. Fox Jr., served as U.S. Ambassador to Trinidad and Tobago.

On April 8, 2013, it was announced that Alston had taken an indefinite leave of absence from the team to undergo treatment for chronic myelogenous leukemia, a rare but treatable form of leukemia. In July 2013, Alston returned to soccer and was removed from the disabled list. He resumed playing for the Revolution on July 28, 2013. Alston was voted in 2013 as the MLS Comeback Player of the Year.

== Honors ==
- MLS Comeback Player of the Year Award: 2013
