= Kevin Coleman (soccer) =

American footballer (born 1998)

Personal information
- Full name: Kevin Jessie Coleman
- Date of birth: March 1, 1998 (age 28)
- Place of birth: Fairfax, Virginia, United States
- Height: 5 ft 10 in (1.78 m)
- Positions: Forward; winger

Team information
- Current team: TuS Makkabi Berlin

Youth career
- 2014–2015: Baltimore Celtic
- 2016–2017: 1. FC Kaiserslautern

Senior career*
Years	Team	Apps	(Gls)
2018	SpVgg Bayreuth	12	(0)
2019–2020	Orange County SC	22	(2)
2021–2023	Schwarz-Weiß Rehden	59	(10)
2023–2024	Rot Weiss Ahlen	25	(6)
2024–	TuS Makkabi Berlin	0	(0)
- * Club domestic league appearances and goals as of May 16, 2024

Kevin Coleman (born March 1, 1998) is an American soccer player who plays as a forward for German club TuS Makkabi Berlin in the NOFV-Oberliga Nord.

== Career ==
Coleman moved to Germany to play with the academy team of 1. FC Kaiserslautern, where he stayed for two years, before moving to Regionalliga Bayern side SpVgg Bayreuth at the end of their 2017–18 season.

Coleman returned to the United States, joining USL Championship side Orange County SC on March 15, 2019.
