= 2018 Orange County SC season =

Orange County SC
2018 season
- Owner: James Keston
- Head coach: Braeden Cloutier
- United Soccer League: Western Conference: 1st
- USL Playoffs: Conference finals (knocked out by Phoenix Rising)
- U.S. Open Cup: Second round (knocked out by Golden State Force)
- Top goalscorer: League: Thomas Enevoldsen (20); All: Thomas Enevoldsen (21)
- Highest home attendance: 5,189 (November 3 vs. Phoenix, Playoffs)
- Lowest home attendance: 500 (May 16 vs. Golden State, USOC)
- Average home league attendance: 3,095
Home colors	Away colors

The 2018 Orange County SC season was the club's eighth season of existence, and their eighth consecutive season in the United Soccer League, the second tier of American soccer. Orange County also competed in the U.S. Open Cup. The season covered the period from October 14, 2017, to the beginning of the 2019 USL season.

OCSC won the Western Conference in the regular season, finishing one point ahead of runners-up Sacramento Republic. It marked the second time in club history that Orange County had topped the conference, after 2015. However, the club would be knocked out in the conference finals by eventual USL Cup runners-up Phoenix Rising. In the U.S. Open Cup, Orange County were eliminated in the second round by Golden State Force, failing to win a game in the competition for the fourth time in club history.

2018 marked the first season with Braeden Cloutier as the club's head coach, and Cloutier's first season as a professional head coach. The season averaged 3,095 fans per home match, and was the second consecutive season that the average attendance had increased.

== Roster ==
As of match played November 3, 2018

No.	Name	Nationality	Position(s)	Date of birth (age)	Signed in	Previous club	Apps	Goals
Goalkeepers
1	Casey Beyers	(United States)	GK	March 21, 1994 (age 32)	2017	(United States) Wisconsin Badgers	6	0
12	Andre Rawls	(United States)	GK	December 20, 1991 (age 34)	2018	(United States) New York City FC (loan)	30	0
25	Aaron Cervantes	(United States)	GK	March 20, 2002 (age 24)	2018	(United States) Pateadores SC	0	0
Defenders
2	Kevin Alston	(United States)	RB, LB	May 5, 1988 (age 38)	2018	(United States) Orlando City SC	23	0
3	Joe Amico	(United States)	RB, LM	April 17, 1995 (age 31)	2018	(United States) Swope Park Rangers	30	0
4	Alex Crognale	(United States)	CB, LB	August 27, 1994 (age 32)	2018	(United States) Columbus Crew SC (loan)	26	4
5	Jos Hooiveld	(Netherlands)	CB	April 22, 1983 (age 43)	2018	(Netherlands) Twente	17	1
6	Noah Powder	(Trinidad and Tobago)	LB	October 27, 1998 (age 27)	2018	(United States) New York Red Bulls II	23	3
21	Thomas Juel-Nielsen	(Denmark)	CB	June 18, 1990 (age 36)	2018	(Denmark) AGF	18	1
23	Owusu-Ansah Kontor	(Ghana)	LB	August 24, 1993 (age 33)	2018	(Greece) AEL	16	0
26	Walker Hume	(United States)	CB	August 21, 1993 (age 33)	2018	(United States) FC Dallas	31	0
Midfielders
10	Richard Chaplow	(England)	CM, AM	February 2, 1985 (age 41)	2016	(England) Doncaster Rovers	57	4
11	Zach Kobayashi	(United States)	MF	August 20, 1997 (age 29)	2017	(Croatia) Dinamo Zagreb	18	4
14	Aodhan Quinn	(United States)	DM, CM, AM	March 22, 1992 (age 34)	2018	(United States) FC Cincinnati	38	12
15	Nicolás Czornomaz	(Argentina)	CM	July 8, 1995 (age 31)	2018	(United States) Los Angeles FC (loan)	5	0
16	Amirgy Pineda	(United States)	LM	January 3, 1997 (age 29)	2017	(United States) Santiago Canyon Hawks	23	1
20	Christian Duke	(United States)	CM, DM	June 5, 1991 (age 35)	2018	(United States) Swope Park Rangers	32	2
22	Koji Hashimoto	(Japan)	CM, LM, RM, LW	April 22, 1986 (age 40)	2018	(Japan) Mito HollyHock	24	2
24	Mats Bjurman	(United States)	RM, LM	March 9, 1994 (age 32)	2018	(United States) Saint Louis FC	59	5
Forwards
7	Thomas Enevoldsen	(Denmark)	ST, RW, LM	July 27, 1987 (age 39)	2018	(Netherlands) NAC Breda	38	21
9	Michael Seaton	(Jamaica)	ST, LM	May 1, 1996 (age 30)	2018	(Israel) Maccabi Ahi Nazareth	30	15
13	Darwin Jones	(United States)	ST	April 4, 1992 (age 34)	2018	(Sweden) IFK Värnamo	16	2
19	Giovanni Ramos-Godoy	(United States)	ST	April 15, 1995 (age 31)	2018	(United States) UC Irvine Anteaters	32	4
27	Rafael Espinoza	(United States)	FW	January 14, 2001 (age 25)	2018	(United States) Slammers FC	0	0

== Non-competitive ==
=== Preseason ===
February 18 Friendly	Orange County SC	1–0	UC Riverside Highlanders	Irvine, CA
2:00 PM PST				Stadium: Championship Soccer Stadium

February 21 Friendly	Cal State Fullerton Titans	2–4	Orange County SC	Fullerton, CA
11:00 AM PST				Stadium: Titan Stadium

February 24 Friendly	San Diego Toreros	1–0	Orange County SC	San Diego, CA
2:00 PM PST				Stadium: Torero Stadium

February 27 Friendly	Orange County SC	4–0	Club Tijuana U20	Irvine, CA
11:00 AM PST				Stadium: Championship Soccer Stadium

March 3 Friendly	LA Galaxy II	3–0	Orange County SC	Carson, CA
11:00 AM PST				Stadium: StubHub Center

March 9 Friendly	Orange County SC	1–1	Las Vegas Lights	Irvine, CA
11:00 AM PST	17'	Report	Kanan 77'	Stadium: Championship Soccer Stadium

== Competitions ==
=== USL ===
==== Standings ====
Pos	Team	Pld	W	D	L	GF	GA	GD	Pts	Qualification
1	Orange County SC	34	20	6	8	70	40	+30	66	Conference Playoffs
2	Sacramento Republic	34	19	8	7	47	32	+15	65	Conference Playoffs
3	Phoenix Rising FC	34	19	6	9	63	38	+25	63	Conference Playoffs
4	Real Monarchs	34	19	3	12	55	47	+8	60	Conference Playoffs
5	Reno 1868 FC	34	16	11	7	56	38	+18	59	Conference Playoffs

Source: 2018 USL standings
Rules for classification: 1) total wins; 2) total goal differential; 3) total goals scored; 4) points earned against top four Conference finishers; 5) disciplinary points; 6) coin toss or drawing of lots

==== Results summary ====
Overall								Home						Away					
Pld	W	D	L	GF	GA	GD	Pts	W	D	L	GF	GA	GD	W	D	L	GF	GA	GD
34	20	6	8	70	40	+30	66	10	4	3	37	20	+17	10	2	5	33	20	+13

Source: USL standings

==== Results by round ====
Round	1	2	3	4	5	6	7	8	9	10	11	12	13	14	15	16	17	18	19	20	21	22	23	24	25	26	27	28	29	30	31	32	33	34
Stadium	H	H	A	A	H	A	A	H	A	H	H	A	A	H	H	A	A	H	H	A	A	H	H	A	H	A	H	A	H	A	H	A	H	A
Result	D	L	W	W	W	W	L	W	L	D	W	L	W	D	W	L	W	L	W	W	D	D	W	W	W	W	L	D	W	W	W	W	W	L

Source: Orange County schedule
A = Away; H = Home; W = Win; D = Draw; L = Loss

==== Match results ====
In August 2017, the USL announced that the 2018 season would span 34 games, the longest regular season the league had ever run. The expansion was spurred by the addition of six new clubs for the 2018 season: Atlanta United 2, Fresno FC, Indy Eleven, Las Vegas Lights, Nashville SC, and North Carolina FC.

On January 14, 2018, the league announced home openers for every club. Orange County opened the season with a home match against Phoenix Rising, marking the first season-opening match to ever be played at Championship Soccer Stadium. In 2017, the club played its first four matches on the road before getting to open the new stadium on May 6.

The schedule for the remainder of the 2018 season was released on January 19. Orange County played three times against both LA Galaxy II and Phoenix. They played every other Western Conference team twice.

March 17 1	Orange County SC	1–1	Phoenix Rising	Irvine, CA
7:00 PM PDT	Seaton (yellow card) 28'; Quinn (yellow card) 68'; Crognale (yellow card) 83', (goal) 90'	Report	Asante 11', (yellow card) 36'; Mala (yellow card) 20'; Dubose (yellow card) 85'	Stadium: Championship Soccer Stadium; Attendance: 3,127; Referee: Michael Radchuk

March 24 2	Orange County SC	0–1	Sacramento Republic	Irvine, CA
7:00 PM PDT	Hashimoto (yellow card) 18'; Segbers (yellow card) 50'; Sorto (yellow card) 58'; Seaton (red card) 76'; Crognale (yellow card) 81'	Report	Iwasa 66'; Bijev (yellow card) 90+3'	Stadium: Championship Soccer Stadium; Attendance: 2,236; Referee: Farhad Dadkho

March 28 3	OKC Energy	0–1	Orange County SC	Oklahoma City, OK
5:00 PM PDT	Adjei (yellow card) 81'	Report	Enevoldsen 13'; Sorto (yellow card) 36'; Quinn (yellow card) 60'	Stadium: Taft Stadium; Attendance: 2,574; Referee: Rubiel Vazquez

March 31 4	Tulsa Roughnecks	0–5	Orange County SC	Tulsa, OK
1:00 PM PDT	Montano (yellow card) 13'; Binns (red card) 26'; Cerda (yellow card) 31'; Rivas (yellow card) 37'; Arce (yellow card) 63'; Jusino (yellow card) 66'; Lennon (red card) 72'	Report	Enevoldsen 15', 29', 77'; Chaplow 19'; Powder (yellow card) 78'; Hashimoto (yellow card) 80'; Seaton 81'	Stadium: ONEOK Field; Attendance: 3,058; Referee: Rosendo Mendoza

April 7 5	Orange County SC	3–0	LA Galaxy II	Irvine, CA
7:00 PM PDT	Segbers 45', 58'; Powder (yellow card) 56'; Enevoldsen (yellow card) 71'; Juel-Nielsen (yellow card) 82'; Seaton (yellow card) 84'; Selbol 88', (yellow card) 89'	Report	Engola (red card) 30'; Méndez (red card) 54'; F. López (yellow card) 83'	Stadium: Championship Soccer Stadium; Attendance: 3,056; Referee: Mark Allatin

April 14 6	San Antonio FC	0–3	Orange County SC	San Antonio, TX
5:30 PM PDT	Felix (yellow card) 55'; Elizondo (yellow card) 72'	Report	Crognale (yellow card) 6'; Sorto (yellow card) 24'; Hashimoto 48'; Enevoldsen 83'; Ramos-Godoy 86'	Stadium: Toyota Field; Attendance: 6,090; Referee: Elton Garcia

April 25 7	Rio Grande Valley FC Toros	2–0	Orange County SC	Edinburg, TX
5:00 PM PDT	Rodríguez 36'; Ontiveros (yellow card) 40'; Aguilar (yellow card) 47'; Quintanilla 89'	Report	Amico (yellow card) 82'; Segbers (yellow card) 88'	Stadium: H-E-B Park; Attendance: 4,145; Referee: Mark Allatin

April 28 8	Orange County SC	1–0	Colorado Springs Switchbacks	Irvine, CA
7:00 PM PDT	Quinn 6' (pen.); Amico (yellow card) 8'; Crognale (yellow card) 90+3'	Report	Ajeakwa (yellow card) 90+3'	Stadium: Championship Soccer Stadium; Attendance: 3,742; Referee: Michael Radchuk

May 4 9	Real Monarchs	2–1	Orange County SC	Herriman, UT
6:00 PM PDT	Chang 6'; Adams (yellow card) 26', (yellow card) 82' (red card); Mare 90+1', (yellow card) 90+1'; Sparrow (yellow card) 90+4'	Report	Quinn (yellow card) 38', (goal) 45+1' (pen.); Amico (yellow card) 89'	Stadium: Zions Bank Stadium; Attendance: 1,644; Referee: Lukasz Szpala

May 12 10	Orange County SC	1–1	Saint Louis FC	Irvine, CA
7:00 PM PDT	Juel-Nielsen (yellow card) 30'; Kavita 78' (o.g.); Enevoldsen (yellow card) 82'	Report	Hilton 82'; Barden (red card) 90+2'	Stadium: Championship Soccer Stadium; Attendance: 3,209; Referee: Adrian Gonzalez

May 26 11	Orange County SC	3–0	Fresno FC	Irvine, CA
7:00 PM PDT	Enevoldsen 10', (yellow card) 45+1'; Duke (yellow card) 50'; Seaton 66'; Ramos-Godoy 90+3'	Report	Fiddes (yellow card) 42'; Ribeiro (yellow card) 48'; Daly (yellow card) 57'	Stadium: Championship Soccer Stadium; Attendance: 2,846; Referee: Brandon Stevis

June 2 12	Sacramento Republic	1–0	Orange County SC	Sacramento, CA
8:00 PM PDT	Hall 58' (pen.); Turnley (yellow card) 80'; Moffat (yellow card) 81'	Report	Hashimoto (yellow card) 10'; Amico (yellow card) 26', (yellow card) 90+3' (red card); Kontor (yellow card) 32'; Juel-Nielsen (yellow card) 90+1'; Ramos-Godoy (yellow card) 90+2'	Stadium: Papa Murphy's Park; Attendance: 11,569; Referee: Malik Badawi

June 10 13	LA Galaxy II	0–1	Orange County SC	Carson, CA
5:30 PM PDT	Aguilar (yellow card) 44'; Appiah (yellow card) 62'	Report	Enevoldsen 82'	Stadium: StubHub Center Track Stadium; Attendance: 1,313; Referee: Farhad Dadkho

June 16 14	Orange County SC	2–2	Reno 1868	Irvine, CA
6:00 PM PDT	Hooiveld (yellow card) 54'; Enevoldsen 62'; Juel-Nielsen 69'; Quinn (yellow card) 82'	Report	Brown 55' (pen.); Musovski (yellow card) 73', (goal) 83'	Stadium: Championship Soccer Stadium; Attendance: 2,840; Referee: Daniel Radford

June 23 15	Orange County SC	6–1	Tulsa Roughnecks	Irvine, CA
7:00 PM PDT	Hooiveld 16'; Enevoldsen 37'; Crognale 61'; Quinn 66' (pen.); Duke (yellow card) 69'; Czornomaz (yellow card) 84'; Pineda 86'; Bjurman 90'	Report	Levin (yellow card) 27'; Bakero 58'	Stadium: Championship Soccer Stadium; Attendance: 3,046; Referee: Ceciah Valero

June 29 16	Phoenix Rising	1–0	Orange County SC	Tempe, AZ
6:30 PM PDT	Cortez 13'; Wakasa (red card) 35'; Asante (yellow card) 37' da Fonte (yellow card) 55'; Woszczynski (yellow card) 89'	Report		Stadium: Phoenix Rising FC Soccer Complex; Attendance: 7,001; Referee: Mark Allatin

July 3 17	Colorado Springs Switchbacks	0–1	Orange County SC	Colorado Springs, CO
6:00 PM PDT		Report	Seaton 2'; Duke (yellow card) 14'; Kontor (yellow card) 88'	Stadium: Weidner Field; Attendance: 4,521; Referee: Adam Zarrin

July 7 18	Orange County SC	0–3	LA Galaxy II	Irvine, CA
7:00 PM PDT	Crognale (yellow card) 41'	Report	Zubak 3'; Acheampong (yellow card) 15', (yellow card) 45+1' (red card); F. López 23'; Jon. Hernandez 52'; Sylvestre (yellow card) 62'	Stadium: Championship Soccer Stadium; Attendance: 3,246; Referee: Alfredo Sandoval-Victorio

July 14 19	Orange County SC	3–0	San Antonio FC	Irvine, CA
7:00 PM PDT	Bjurman (yellow card) 23', (goal) 63'; Enevoldsen 33'; Quinn (yellow card) 75'; Seaton (yellow card) 81', (goal) 90+3'; Pineda (yellow card) 90'	Report	Lopez (yellow card) 28'; Guzmán (yellow card) 41'; Restrepo (yellow card) 52'; Elizondo (yellow card) 73'; Hedrick (yellow card) 85'; Roushandel (yellow card) 88'	Stadium: Championship Soccer Stadium; Attendance: 2,712; Referee: Ramy Touchan

July 18 20	Swope Park Rangers	0–4	Orange County SC	Kansas City, KS
5:30 PM PDT	Hernandez (yellow card) 58'	Report	Seaton 13'; Enevoldsen 71'; Ramos-Godoy 79'; Quinn 82' (pen.)	Stadium: Children's Mercy Park; Attendance: 1,011; Referee: Luis Guardia

July 21 21	Saint Louis FC	2–2	Orange County SC	Fenton, MO
5:30 PM PDT	Greig 70' da Silva 79'	Report	Bjurman 30', (yellow card) 90+1'; Segbers (yellow card) 52'; Alston (yellow card) 55'; Ramos-Godoy 76'	Stadium: Toyota Stadium; Attendance: 3,697; Referee: Malik Badawi

August 1 22	Orange County SC	2–2	Portland Timbers 2	Irvine, CA
12:30 PM PDT	Quinn 62'; Enevoldsen 84'	Report	Loría 13'; Barmby 31'	Stadium: Championship Soccer Stadium; Attendance: 4,124; Referee: Joseph Salinas

August 4 23	Orange County SC	2–1	Swope Park Rangers	Irvine, CA
7:00 PM PDT	Jones 16', 43'	Report	Hernandez 19'; Minter (yellow card) 25'; Smith (yellow card) 57'	Stadium: Championship Soccer Stadium; Attendance: 3,204; Referee: Samantha Martinez

August 11 24	Phoenix Rising	3–4	Orange County SC	Tempe, AZ
6:30 PM PDT	Fernandez (yellow card) 38'; Mala (yellow card) 59'; Asante 68' (pen.), 90+4'; Dubose 73'	Report	Seaton 39', 67', (yellow card) 40'; Enevoldsen 48'; Quinn 65' (pen.); Alston (yellow card) 90+1'	Stadium: Phoenix Rising FC Soccer Complex; Attendance: 6,330; Referee: Malik Badawi

August 15 25	Orange County SC	3–1	Las Vegas Lights	Irvine, CA
7:00 PM PDT	Enevoldsen 26'; Seaton 29', 65', (yellow card) 81'; Rawls (red card) 56'; Alston (yellow card) 90+2'	Report	Thomas 16'	Stadium: Championship Soccer Stadium; Attendance: 2,360; Referee: Tim Ford

August 22 26	Portland Timbers 2	2–3	Orange County SC	Portland, OR
7:00 PM PDT	Conechny 44', (yellow card) 57'; Langsdorf (yellow card) 54', (goal) 79'	Report	Enevoldsen 9', 85'; Quinn (yellow card) 27'; Crognale 65'	Stadium: Merlo Field; Attendance: 1,017; Referee: Farhad Dadkho

August 25 27	Orange County SC	0–2	Rio Grande Valley FC Toros	Irvine, CA
7:00 PM PDT	Hooiveld (yellow card) 57'	Report	Zaldívar 30'; Small 45+2'; Wharton (yellow card) 90'	Stadium: Championship Soccer Stadium; Attendance: 2,958; Referee: Elton Garcia

September 2 28	Seattle Sounders FC 2	1–1	Orange County SC	Tacoma, WA
1:30 PM PDT	Daley 12', (yellow card) 63'; Usman (yellow card) 52'; Roldan (yellow card) 59'	Report	Crognale 57'; Alston (yellow card) 70'	Stadium: Cheney Stadium; Attendance: 2,526; Referee: Alejandro Mariscal

September 8 29	Orange County SC	3–2	OKC Energy	Irvine, CA
7:00 PM PDT	Seaton 24'; Powder 90+4'; Quinn 90+5'; Hooiveld (yellow card) 90+6'	Report	Rasmussen 20' (pen.); Ibeagha (yellow card) 32'; A. Dixon 64'	Stadium: Championship Soccer Stadium; Attendance: 3,468; Referee: Daniel Radford

September 16 30	Fresno FC	0–1	Orange County SC	Fresno, CA
7:00 PM PDT		Report	Powder (yellow card) 44', (goal) 84'; Duke (yellow card) 49'; Enevoldsen (yellow card) 80'	Stadium: Chukchansi Park; Attendance: 3,056; Referee: Michael Radchuk

September 19 31	Orange County SC	5–2	Real Monarchs	Irvine, CA
7:00 PM PDT	Crognale (yellow card) 22'; Quinn 36', 80' (pen.); Powder 37'; Duke 77'; Amico (yellow card) 81'; Enevoldsen 88'	Report	Portillo (yellow card) 1', (goal) 63'; Ryden 7', (yellow card) 79'; Chang (yellow card) 82'	Stadium: Championship Soccer Stadium; Attendance: 2,238; Referee: Mark Allatin

September 26 32	Las Vegas Lights	3–5	Orange County SC	Las Vegas, NV
8:00 PM PDT	J. García 36'; Garduño 45+3', (yellow card) 81'; Ochoa 48', (yellow card) 77'; Torres (yellow card) 80'; R. Garcia (yellow card) 83'	Report	Quinn 8'; Enevoldsen 31', 90+4'; Seaton 54', 76'; Amico (yellow card) 90+1'	Stadium: Cashman Field; Attendance: 3,875; Referee: Jon Freemon

October 6 33	Orange County SC	2–1	Seattle Sounders FC 2	Irvine, CA
7:00 PM PDT	Chaplow 62'; Quinn 90+4' (pen.)	Report	Burke-Gilroy (yellow card) 13'; Daley (yellow card) 22'; Gonzalez 60'; Malone (yellow card) 85'; Vargas (yellow card) 90+3'	Stadium: Championship Soccer Stadium; Attendance: 4,206; Referee: Omeed Azadpour

October 13 34	Reno 1868	3–1	Orange County SC	Reno, NV
6:00 PM PDT	Griffiths 15', (yellow card) 83'; Hoppenot 44', 63'; Gonzalez (yellow card) 70'	Report	Enevoldsen 58'	Stadium: Greater Nevada Field; Attendance: 5,136; Referee: Joseph Dickerson

=== Postseason ===
October 20 Quarterfinals	Orange County SC	4–0	Saint Louis FC	Irvine, CA
6:00 PM PDT	Seaton 11', 29', 64', (yellow card) 21'; Quinn (yellow card) 47'; Bjurman 66'	Report	Walls (red card) 21'; Hertzog (yellow card) 88'	Stadium: Championship Soccer Stadium; Attendance: 3,360; Referee: Ramy Touchan

October 27 Semifinals	Orange County SC	1–0	Reno 1868	Irvine, CA
7:00 PM PDT	Alston (yellow card) 21'; Quinn 29'; Duke (yellow card) 90+2'	Report	Richards (yellow card) 12'; Brown (yellow card) 41'; Hoppenot (yellow card) 45+2'	Stadium: Championship Soccer Stadium; Attendance: 4,021; Referee: Victor Rivas

November 3 Finals	Orange County SC	1–2	Phoenix Rising	Irvine, CA
7:00 PM PDT	Chaplow (yellow card) 47'; Hashimoto 82'	Report	Cortez 2'; Drogba 73'; Forbes (yellow card) 90+7'	Stadium: Championship Soccer Stadium; Attendance: 5,189; Referee: Tim Ford

=== U.S. Open Cup ===
May 16 Second round	Orange County SC	2–4	Golden State Force	Irvine, CA
7:00 PM PDT	Duke 28'; Enevoldsen 33'	Report	Villalobos 30'; Allisson 48' (pen.), (yellow card) 76'; Goñi 67'; García (yellow card) 80'; Fonseca 89', (yellow card) 89'; Miranda (yellow card) 90+2'	Stadium: Championship Soccer Stadium; Attendance: 500; Referee: Omeed Azadpour

== Statistics ==
=== Appearances and goals ===
No.	Pos.	Name	USL		USL Playoffs		U.S. Open Cup		Total	
No.	Pos.	Name	Apps	Goals	Apps	Goals	Apps	Goals	Apps	Goals
1	GK	(United States) Casey Beyers	4	0	0	0	0	0	4	0
2	DF	(United States) Kevin Alston	20	0	3	0	0	0	23	0
3	DF	(United States) Joe Amico	26	0	3	0	1	0	30	0
4	DF	(United States) Alex Crognale	23	4	3	0	0	0	26	4
5	DF	(Netherlands) Jos Hooiveld	14	1	3	0	0	0	17	1
6	DF	(Trinidad and Tobago) Noah Powder	21	3	1	0	1	0	23	3
7	FW	(Denmark) Thomas Enevoldsen	34	20	3	0	1	1	38	21
9	FW	(Jamaica) Michael Seaton	26	12	3	3	1	0	30	15
10	MF	(England) Richard Chaplow	21	2	3	0	1	0	25	2
11	MF	(United States) Zach Kobayashi	0	0	0	0	0	0	0	0
12	GK	(United States) Andre Rawls	26	0	3	0	1	0	30	0
13	FW	(United States) Darwin Jones	13	2	3	0	0	0	16	2
14	MF	(United States) Aodhan Quinn	34	1	3	1	1	0	38	12
15	MF	(Argentina) Nicolás Czornomaz	5	0	0	0	0	0	5	0
16	MF	(United States) Amirgy Pineda	5	1	1	0	0	0	6	1
19	FW	(United States) Giovanni Ramos-Godoy	29	4	2	0	1	0	32	4
20	MF	(United States) Christian Duke	29	1	2	0	1	1	32	2
21	DF	(Denmark) Thomas Juel-Nielsen	17	1	0	0	1	0	18	1
22	MF	(Japan) Koji Hashimoto	21	1	2	1	1	0	24	2
23	DF	(Ghana) Owusu-Ansah Kontor	16	0	0	0	0	0	16	0
24	MF	(United States) Mats Bjurman	28	3	3	1	1	0	32	4
25	GK	(United States) Aaron Cervantes	0	0	0	0	0	0	0	0
26	DF	(United States) Walker Hume	20	0	0	0	1	0	21	0
27	FW	(United States) Rafael Espinoza	0	0	0	0	0	0	0	0
Players who left the club during the season:
2	DF	(United States) Oscar Sorto	7	0	0	0	0	0	7	0
17	MF	(United States) Mark Segbers	19	2	0	0	0	0	19	2
18	GK	(Honduras) Luis López	5	0	0	0	0	0	5	0
18	FW	(Nigeria) Nansel Selbol	8	1	0	0	1	0	9	1

Source: OCSC stats

=== Disciplinary record ===
No.	Pos.	Name	USL		USL Playoffs		U.S. Open Cup		Total	
No.	Pos.	Name	Booked	Sent off (straight red)	Booked	Sent off (straight red)	Booked	Sent off (straight red)	Booked	Sent off (straight red)
2	DF	(United States) Kevin Alston	4	0	1	0	0	0	5	0
3	DF	(United States) Joe Amico	5	1	0	0	0	0	5	1
4	DF	(United States) Alex Crognale	6	0	0	0	0	0	6	0
5	DF	(Netherlands) Jos Hooiveld	3	0	0	0	0	0	3	0
6	DF	(Trinidad and Tobago) Noah Powder	3	0	0	0	0	0	3	0
7	FW	(Denmark) Thomas Enevoldsen	4	0	0	0	0	0	4	0
9	FW	(Jamaica) Michael Seaton	5	1	1	0	0	0	6	1
10	MF	(England) Richard Chaplow	0	0	1	0	0	0	1	0
12	GK	(United States) Andre Rawls	0	1	0	0	0	0	0	1
14	MF	(United States) Aodhan Quinn	6	0	1	0	0	0	7	0
15	MF	(Argentina) Nicolás Czornomaz	1	0	0	0	0	0	1	0
16	MF	(United States) Amirgy Pineda	1	0	0	0	0	0	1	0
19	FW	(United States) Giovanni Ramos-Godoy	1	0	0	0	0	0	1	0
20	MF	(United States) Christian Duke	4	0	1	0	0	0	5	0
21	DF	(Denmark) Thomas Juel-Nielsen	3	0	0	0	0	0	3	0
22	MF	(Japan) Koji Hashimoto	3	0	0	0	0	0	3	0
23	DF	(Ghana) Owusu-Ansah Kontor	2	0	0	0	0	0	2	0
24	MF	(United States) Mats Bjurman	2	0	0	0	0	0	2	0
Players who left the club during the season:
2	DF	(United States) Oscar Sorto	3	0	0	0	0	0	3	0
17	MF	(United States) Mark Segbers	3	0	0	0	0	0	3	0
18	FW	(Nigeria) Nansel Selbol	1	0	0	0	0	0	1	0

Source: OCSC stats

=== Clean sheets ===
No.	Name	USL	USL Playoffs	U.S. Open Cup	Total	Games Played		
No.	Name	1	(United States) Casey Beyers	1	0	0	1	4
12	(United States) Andre Rawls	8	2	0	10	30		
25	(United States) Aaron Cervantes	0	0	0	0	0		
Players who left the club during the season:
18	(Honduras) Luis López	2	0	0	2	5		

Source: OCSC stats

== Transfers ==
=== In ===
Pos.	Player	Transferred from	Fee/notes	Date	Source
MF	(United States) Christian Duke	(United States) Swope Park Rangers	Terms of the deal were undisclosed.	December 14, 2017	
MF	(United States) Aodhan Quinn	(United States) FC Cincinnati	Terms of the deal were undisclosed.	December 15, 2017	
MF	(United States) Mats Bjurman	(United States) Saint Louis FC	Terms of the deal were undisclosed.	February 7, 2018	
FW	(Denmark) Thomas Enevoldsen	(Netherlands) NAC Breda	Terms of the deal were undisclosed.	February 10, 2018	
DF	(Denmark) Thomas Juel-Nielsen	(Denmark) AGF	Terms of the deal were undisclosed.	February 14, 2018	
DF	(United States) Joe Amico	(United States) Swope Park Rangers	Terms of the deal were undisclosed.	February 16, 2018	
DF	(Ghana) Owusu-Ansah Kontor	(Greece) AEL	Terms of the deal were undisclosed.	February 26, 2018	
DF	(Trinidad and Tobago) Noah Powder	(United States) New York Red Bulls II	Terms of the deal were undisclosed.	February 27, 2018	
FW	(Nigeria) Nansel Selbol	(United States) Swope Park Rangers	Terms of the deal were undisclosed.	March 8, 2018	
FW	(Jamaica) Michael Seaton	(Israel) Maccabi Ahi Nazareth	Terms of the deal were undisclosed.	March 12, 2018	
FW	(United States) Giovanni Ramos-Godoy	(United States) UC Irvine Anteaters	Terms of the deal were undisclosed.	March 12, 2018	
DF	(United States) Walker Hume	(United States) FC Dallas	Terms of the deal were undisclosed.	March 15, 2018	
GK	(United States) Aaron Cervantes	(United States) Pateadores SC	Terms of the deal were undisclosed.	March 15, 2018	
MF	(Japan) Koji Hashimoto	(Japan) Mito HollyHock	Terms of the deal were undisclosed.	March 16, 2018	
DF	(Netherlands) Jos Hooiveld	(Netherlands) Twente	Terms of the deal were undisclosed.	June 5, 2018	
DF	(United States) Kevin Alston	(United States) Orlando City SC	Terms of the deal were undisclosed.	June 8, 2018	
FW	(United States) Darwin Jones	(Sweden) IFK Värnamo	Terms of the deal were undisclosed.	July 17, 2018	
FW	(United States) Rafael Espinoza	(United States) Slammers FC	Signed to a USL Academy contract.	August 16, 2018	

=== Loan in ===
Pos.	Player	Parent club	Length/Notes	Beginning	End	Source
GK	(United States) Andre Rawls	(United States) New York City FC	Duration of the 2018 USL season.	March 15, 2018	November 4, 2018	
DF	(United States) Alex Crognale	(United States) Columbus Crew SC	On a match-by-match basis.	March 15, 2018	May 5, 2018	
DF	(United States) Alex Crognale	(United States) Columbus Crew SC	On a match-by-match basis.	May 22, 2018	June 2, 2018	
DF	(United States) Alex Crognale	(United States) Columbus Crew SC	On a match-by-match basis.	June 18, 2018	November 4, 2018	
MF	(United States) Mark Segbers	(United States) New England Revolution	Duration of the 2018 USL season.	March 15, 2018	August 29, 2018	
MF	(Argentina) Nicolás Czornomaz	(United States) Los Angeles FC	Duration of the 2018 USL season.	April 24, 2018	November 4, 2018	
GK	(Honduras) Luis López	(United States) Los Angeles FC	On a match-by-match basis.	July 13, 2018	July 26, 2018	
GK	(Honduras) Luis López	(United States) Los Angeles FC	On a match-by-match basis.	August 1, 2018	August 5, 2018	
GK	(Honduras) Luis López	(United States) Los Angeles FC	On a match-by-match basis.	August 22, 2018	August 24, 2018	

=== Out ===
Pos.	Player	Transferred to	Fee/notes	Date	Source
DF	(United States) Sola Abolaji		Contract expired. Retired.	October 14, 2017	
MF	(England) James Baxendale	(England) Alfreton Town	Contract expired. Signed for Alfreton on December 19, 2017.	October 14, 2017	
DF	(Cameroon) Jeannot Esua		Contract expired.	October 14, 2017	
FW	(Cape Verde) Wuilito Fernandes	(United States) North Carolina FC	Contract expired. Signed for NCFC on January 25, 2018.	October 14, 2017	
DF	(United States) Joe Franco		Contract expired.	October 14, 2017	
MF	(United States) Kevin Jeon		Contract expired.	October 14, 2017	
FW	(United States) Duke Lacroix	(United States) Reno 1868	Contract expired. Signed for Reno on April 19, 2018.	October 14, 2017	
GK	(United States) Charlie Lyon	(United States) Los Angeles FC	Contract expired. Signed for LAFC on March 2, 2018.	October 14, 2017	
DF	(Belgium) Roy Meeus		Contract expired.	October 14, 2017	
DF	(United States) Beto Navarro	(United States) Fresno FC	Contract expired. Signed for Fresno on March 17, 2018.	October 14, 2017	
MF	(Netherlands) Frank Olijve	(Netherlands) De Graafschap	Contract expired. Signed for De Graafschap on January 10, 2018.	October 14, 2017	
MF	(United States) Irvin Parra		Contract expired.	October 14, 2017	
MF	(United States) Victor Pineda		Contract expired.	October 14, 2017	
MF	(Serbia) Dusan Stevanovic	(United States) California United FC II	Contract expired. Signed for Cal United II for the 2018 UPSL season.	October 14, 2017	
GK	(United States) Michael Suchy		Contract expired.	October 14, 2017	
FW	(Netherlands) Jerry van Ewijk	(United States) Reno 1868	Contract expired. Signed for Reno on January 26, 2018.	October 14, 2017	
FW	(United States) Gustavo Villalobos	(United States) California United FC II	Contract expired. Signed for Cal United II for the 2018 UPSL season.	October 14, 2017	
DF	(United States) Oscar Sorto		Departed through mutual consent.	May 9, 2018	
FW	(Nigeria) Nansel Selbol		Departed through mutual consent.	June 25, 2018	

== Awards ==
=== USL Team of the Week ===
Week	Starters	Bench	Opponent(s)	Link
3	(Denmark) Thomas Enevoldsen	(United States) Alex Crognale	OKC Energy; Tulsa Roughnecks	
4	(United States) Mark Segbers		LA Galaxy II	
5	(United States) Andre Rawls	(Denmark) Thomas Enevoldsen	San Antonio FC	
7		(Denmark) Thomas Juel-Nielsen	Rio Grande Valley FC Toros; Colorado Springs Switchbacks	
11		(Denmark) Thomas Enevoldsen	Fresno FC	
13		(United States) Andre Rawls	LA Galaxy II	
15	(United States) Aodhan Quinn	(Denmark) Thomas Enevoldsen	Tulsa Roughnecks	
18	(United States) Aodhan Quinn		San Antonio FC	
19	(United States) Aodhan Quinn	(United States) Giovanni Ramos-Godoy	Saint Louis FC	
21	(United States) Darwin Jones	(United States) Aodhan Quinn	Portland Timbers 2 Swope Park Rangers	
22	(Jamaica) Michael Seaton		Phoenix Rising	
23	(Jamaica) Michael Seaton	(Denmark) Thomas Enevoldsen	Las Vegas Lights	
26	(United States) Aodhan Quinn		OKC Energy	
27	(United States) Walker Hume		Fresno FC	
28	(United States) Aodhan Quinn		Real Monarchs	
29	(Jamaica) Michael Seaton	(Denmark) Thomas Enevoldsen	Las Vegas Lights	
30	(Netherlands) Jos Hooiveld		Seattle Sounders FC 2	

=== USL Player of the Week ===
Week	Player	Opponent(s)	Link
3	(Denmark) Thomas Enevoldsen	OKC Energy; Tulsa Roughnecks	
23	(Jamaica) Michael Seaton	Las Vegas Lights	

=== Postseason ===
USL All-League First Team

- FW Thomas Enevoldsen
- MF Aodhan Quinn

== Kits ==
Home	Away

Type	Shirt	Shorts	Socks	First appearance / Record
Home	Black	Black	Black	Match 1 vs. Phoenix / 16–4–5
Away	White	White	White	Match 6 vs. San Antonio / 6–2–5

== See also ==
- Orange County SC
- 2018 in American soccer
- 2018 USL season
