= 2014 Richmond Kickers season =

Richmond Kickers
2014 season
- Owner: Richmond Kickers Youth Soccer Club
- Head coach: (England) Leigh Cowlishaw
- Stadium: City Stadium
- USL Pro: 4th
- USL Pro Playoffs: Semi-finals
- U.S. Open Cup: Fourth round
- Top goalscorer: Matthew Delicâte (14)
- Highest home attendance: League: 3,562 (August 23 v. Orlando City); All: 7,851 (July 28 v. Crystal Palace)
- Lowest home attendance: League: 2,135 (July 12 v. Sacramento); All: 511 (March 1 v. U. of Maryland)
- Average home league attendance: League: 2,572; All: 1,848
Home colors	Away colors	Third colors

The 2014 Richmond Kickers season was the club's twenty-second season of existence, seventh-consecutive year in the third-tier of American soccer, and their third-consecutive season playing in USL Pro. For the second season, the Kickers reached the semifinals of the USL Pro playoffs, before losing to the Harrisburg City Islanders. The Kickers finished shy of defending their regular season title, finishing in fourth place in the league table. In the Open Cup, the Kickers were eliminated in the fourth round proper by Major League Soccer outfit, New England Revolution.

== First team squad ==
As of 30 March 2014

=== First team roster ===
No.	Position	Nation	Player
0	GK	USA	Andrew Romig
1	GK	USA	Ryan Taylor
2	DF	CMR	Yomby William
3	DF	USA	Shane Johnson
4	MF	USA	Luke Vercollone
5	MF	USA	Michael Callahan
7	MF	ENG	Matthew Delicâte
8	DF	USA	Hugh Roberts
9	FW	USA	Tishan Hanley
11	FW	USA	George Davis IV
12	MF	USA	Alex Caskey (on loan from D.C. United)
14	MF	USA	Collin Martin (on loan from D.C. United)
15	FW	USA	Kyle Porter (on loan from D.C. United)
16	FW	COL	Juan Arbelaez
17	FW	USA	Jason Yeisley
18	DF	USA	Alex Lee
20	DF	USA	Matheau Hall
21	DF	USA	Jalen Robinson (on loan from D.C. United)
23	DF	GER	Sascha Görres
25	DF	UGA	Henry Kalungi
27	MF	NZL	Shay Spitz
28	MF	GHA	Samuel Asante
29	FW	JAM	Michael Seaton (on loan from D.C. United)
31	GK	USA	Joe Willis (on loan from D.C. United)
32	MF	USA	Lyndsey Moreland
36	DF	USA	Stephen Basso
—	FW	HAI	Christiano François (on loan from D.C. United)

== Transfers ==
=== In ===
No.	Pos.	Player	Transferred from	Fee/notes	Date	Source
27	FW	(New Zealand) Shay Spitz	(United States) Orange County Blues	Free transfer	November 21, 2013	
28	MF	(Ghana) Samuel Asante	(United States) Charlotte Eagles	Free transfer	November 22, 2013	
11	FW	(United States) George Davis IV	(United States) Orange County Blues	Free transfer	February 28, 2014	
8	DF	(United States) Hugh Roberts	(United States) George Mason Patriots	Free transfer	March 7, 2014	
9	MF	(Saint Kitts and Nevis) Tishan Hanley	(United States) RVA FC	Free transfer	April 25, 2014	

=== Loan in ===
No.	Pos.	Player	Loaned from	Start	End	Source
31	GK	(United States) Joe Willis	(United States) D.C. United	February 26, 2014		
21	FW	(Haiti) Christiano François	(United States) D.C. United	February 26, 2014		
24	MF	(United States) Collin Martin	(United States) D.C. United	February 26, 2014		
15	DF	(United States) Steve Birnbaum	(United States) D.C. United	March 22, 2014		
29	FW	(Jamaica) Michael Seaton	(United States) D.C. United	March 22, 2014		
19	MF	(Canada) Kyle Porter	(United States) D.C. United	April 4, 2014		

== Statistics ==
=== Appearances and goals ===
No.	Pos	Nat	Player	Total		Regular Season		U.S. Open Cup		Playoffs	
No.	Pos	Nat	Player	Apps	Goals	Apps	Goals	Apps	Goals	Apps	Goals
0	GK	(United States) USA	Ryan Taylor	0	0	0	0	0	0	0	0

== Competitions and results ==
=== Preseason ===
February 22	Richmond Kickers	1–0	George Mason Patriots	Ampthill, Virginia
19:00 EST	Fowler 83' (pen.)			Stadium: Ukrop Park; Attendance: 527

February 26	Richmond Kickers	1–0	James Madison Dukes	Ampthill, Virginia
19:30 EST	Vercollone 66'			Stadium: Ukrop Park; Attendance: 531

March 1	Richmond Kickers	0–1	Maryland Terrapins	Ampthill, Virginia
12:00 EST			Eticha 52'	Stadium: Ukrop Park; Attendance: 511

March 8	Richmond Kickers	2–1	VCU Rams	Richmond, Virginia
18:00 EST	Davis IV 76'; Hanley 89'		Belmar 67'	Stadium: City Stadium; Attendance: 856

March 16	Red-White	3–2	Red-Black	Ampthill, Virginia
14:00 EST				Stadium: Ukrop Park
Note: Intersquad scrimmage

March 19	Richmond Kickers	6–0	William & Mary Tribe	Ampthill, Virginia
18:00 EST	Delicâte 9', 18', 19'; Hanley (o.g.)			Stadium: Ukrop Park

March 22	Richmond Kickers	3–0	Virginia Cavaliers	Richmond, Virginia
17:00 EST	Seaton 53'; Birnbaum 68'; Hanley 90+2'			Stadium: City Stadium; Attendance: 1,021

=== USL Pro ===
==== Overall standings ====
Pos	Team	Pld	W	T	L	GF	GA	GD	Pts	Qualification
2	Sacramento Republic FC (A)	28	17	4	7	49	28	+21	55	Playoffs
3	LA Galaxy II (A)	28	15	6	7	54	38	+16	51	Playoffs
4	Richmond Kickers (A)	28	13	12	3	53	28	+25	51	Playoffs
5	Charleston Battery (A)	28	11	8	9	36	31	+5	41	Playoffs
6	Rochester Rhinos (A)	28	10	8	10	29	25	+4	38	Playoffs

Source: USL Pro official standings
Rules for classification: 1) points; 2) goal difference; 3) number of goals scored.
(A) Advances to USL Pro Playoffs

==== Match reports ====
March 29 1	Charleston Battery	2–2	Richmond Kickers	Charleston, South Carolina
19:30 EST	vanSchaik 22'; Sanyang 59' (yellow card) 71'	Report	Davis 14', 67'; Yomby (yellow card) 58'; Johnson (yellow card) 89'	Stadium: Blackbaud Stadium; Attendance: 3,524; Referee: Agostino Minasola

April 5 2	Richmond Kickers	3–1	Pittsburgh Riverhounds	Richmond, Virginia
17:00 EST	Seaton 19'; Porter 57', 90'	Report	John 82'	Stadium: City Stadium; Attendance: 3,507; Referee: Mark Gorak

April 12 3	Charlotte Eagles	2–1	Richmond Kickers	Charlotte, North Carolina
19:00 EST	Guzman 54'; Herrera 89'; Gentile (yellow card) 90'	Report	Seaton 32'; Asante (yellow card) 48'	Stadium: Dickson Field; Attendance: 712; Referee: Mark Kadlecik

April 19 4	Richmond Kickers	2–2	Pittsburgh Riverhounds	Richmond, Virginia
17:00 EST	Davis IV (yellow card) 26'; Yomby (yellow card) 33'; Porter 68'; Delicâte 77'	Report	Ownby 11'; Earls (yellow card) 20'; Obodai (yellow card) 22'; Arteaga 61' (pen.); Dallman (yellow card) 63'	Stadium: City Stadium; Attendance: 2,523; Referee: Ted Unkel

April 26 5	Dayton Dutch Lions	1–5	Richmond Kickers	West Carrollton, Ohio
19:00 EST		Report		Stadium: Dayton Outpatient Center Stadium; Attendance: 523; Referee: Sorin Stoica

May 2 6	Richmond Kickers	1–1	Rochester Rhinos	Richmond, Virginia
19:00 EST	Shanosky (yellow card) 34'; Asante (yellow card) 45'; Vercollone (yellow card) 69'; Davis 90'	Report	Sossou (yellow card) 84'; Dixon 89'	Stadium: City Stadium; Attendance: 2,193; Referee: Marcos DeOliveira

May 9 7	Richmond Kickers	4–0	Arizona United SC	Richmond, Virginia
19:00 EST	Spitz (yellow card) 26'; Davis 50'; Delicâte 62'; François 84'; Ruthven 88' (o.g.)	Report	Baladez (red card) 26'; Dillon (yellow card) 52'	Stadium: City Stadium; Attendance: 2,188; Referee: Mark Gorak

May 16 8	Oklahoma City Energy	1–4	Richmond Kickers	Oklahoma City, Oklahoma
20:00 EST	Duke (yellow card) 35'; Greig 81'; Howard (yellow card) 88'	Report	Delicâte 1'; Asante (yellow card) 30'; Yomby 30'; Lee 45'; Seaton (yellow card) 61' (goal) 87'; Davis IV (yellow card) 85'	Stadium: Pribil Stadium; Attendance: 3,916; Referee: Jon Freemon

May 18 9	Chicago Fire Reserves	0–0	Richmond Kickers	Bridgeview, Illinois
17:30 EST	Kinney (yellow card) 84'	Report		Stadium: Toyota Park; Attendance: 1,023; Referee: Nikola Aleksic

May 24 10	Richmond Kickers	2 - 0	Charlotte Eagles	Richmond, Virginia
19:00 EST	Davis 39', 63'; Lee (yellow card) 59'	Summary	Newnam (yellow card) 31'	Stadium: City Stadium; Attendance: 2,677; Referee: Mark Gorak

May 30 11	Rochester Rhinos	0 - 0	Richmond Kickers	Rochester, New York
19:35 EST	Sundly (yellow card) 82'	Summary	Davis (yellow card) 55'; Lee (yellow card) 90+3'	Stadium: Sahlen's Stadium; Attendance: 5,126; Referee: David Mon

May 31 12	Harrisburg City Islanders	2 - 3	Richmond Kickers	Harrisburg, Pennsylvania
19:00 EST	Cox (yellow card) 32'; McLaughlin (yellow card) 52'; Langley 54'; Luan Silva (yellow card) 56'; Roberts 90' (o.g.)	Summary	Jeffrey 6'; Delicâte 62'; Porter 90+2'	Stadium: Skyline Sports Complex; Attendance: 2,233; Referee: Robert Sibiga

June 7 13	Richmond Kickers	1 - 0	Harrisburg City Islanders	Richmond, Virginia
19:00 EST	Delicâte 9'	Summary	José Barril (yellow card) 31'; Hernández (yellow card) 90'	Stadium: City Stadium; Attendance: 2,333; Referee: Mark Gorak

June 14 14	Richmond Kickers	2 - 2	Wilmington Hammerheads	Richmond, Virginia
19:00 EST	Delicâte 13', 45+1'; Vercollone (yellow card) 47'	Summary	Hamilton 80'; Oliveira 84' (yellow card) 90'	Stadium: City Stadium; Attendance: 2,010; Referee: Danielle Chesky

June 22 15	Pittsburgh Riverhounds	1 - 3	Richmond Kickers	Pittsburgh, Pennsylvania
15:00 EST	Earls (yellow card) 16'; Angulo 54'	Summary	Spitz 5'; OG 11'; Vercollone (yellow card) 52'; Delicâte 68'	Stadium: Highmark Stadium; Attendance: 2,644; Referee: David Mon

June 28 17	Wilmington Hammerheads	1 - 1	Richmond Kickers	Wilmington, North Carolina
19:30 EST	Ochoa (yellow card) 43'; Parratt 60'	Summary	Conor Shanosky (yellow card) 76'; Roberts 79'; Vercollone (yellow card) 87'	Stadium: Legion Stadium; Attendance: 2,021; Referee: Michael Rhinehart

July 6 18	Richmond Kickers	0 - 0	Real Salt Lake Reserves	Richmond, Virginia
19:30 EST		Report	Damien German (yellow card) 31'; Benji Lopez (yellow card) 53'; Kwame Watson-Siriboe (yellow card) 54'; Eric Holt (yellow card) 78'; Olmes Garcia (yellow card) 90'	Stadium: City Stadium; Attendance: 2,638; Referee: Mark Kadlecik

July 12 19	Richmond Kickers	2 - 1	Sacramento Republic	Richmond, Virginia
19:00 EST	Seaton (yellow card) 34'; Delicâte 67' 79'	Report	Fochive (yellow card) 34'; Gilberto (yellow card) 35'; Mirković (yellow card) 45'; Jahn 64'; Guzman (yellow card) 70'	Stadium: City Stadium; Attendance: 2,135; Referee: Esteban Rosano

July 19 20	Richmond Kickers	4 - 0	Charleston Battery	Richmond, Virginia
19:00 EST	Shanosky 45'; Davis IV 45'; Yeisley 50'; Delicâte 68'; Lee (yellow card) 90'	Report	Prince (yellow card) 24'; Kelly (yellow card) 90'	Stadium: City Stadium; Attendance: 2,901; Referee: (United States) Matthew Franz

July 22 16	Charleston Battery	1 - 1	Richmond Kickers	Charleston, South Carolina
19:30 EST	Cuevas 7'; Ferguson (yellow card) 17' vanSchaik (yellow card) 72'	Report	Yeisley 14'	Stadium: Blackbaud Stadium; Attendance: 2,214; Referee: (United States) Mark Suaro

July 26 21	Richmond Kickers	2 - 1	Harrisburg City Islanders	Richmond, Virginia
19:00 EST	Vercollone 5' (pen.); Kalungi (yellow card) 13'; Görres 23'; Arbelaez (yellow card) 81'	Report	Bahner (yellow card) 62' (goal) 88'	Stadium: City Stadium; Attendance: 2,788; Referee: (United States) Patrick Rosas

August 1 22	Wilmington Hammerheads	1 - 3	Richmond Kickers	Wilmington, North Carolina
19:30 EST	Hall (yellow card) 44'; Ruggles 66'	Report	Delicâte 19', (yellow card) 76'; Spitz (yellow card) 44', (goal) 45'; Asante 60'	Stadium: Legion Stadium; Attendance: 2,382; Referee: Jeremy Smith

August 9 23	Richmond Kickers	2 - 1	Charlotte Eagles	Richmond, Virginia
19:00 EST	Davis IV 18'; Vercollone 27' (yellow card) 61'	Report	Herrera (yellow card) 52' (goal) 53'; Leathers (yellow card) 59'; Greer (yellow card) 86'; Dixon (yellow card) 87'	Stadium: City Stadium; Attendance: 2,549; Referee: (United States) Robert Chamberlain

August 16 24	Richmond Kickers	1 - 1	Dayton Dutch Lions	Richmond, Virginia
19:00 EST	Davis IV 51'	Report	Harada 80'	Stadium: City Stadium; Attendance: 3,504; Referee: (United States) Charles Carson

August 23 25	Richmond Kickers	2 - 3	Orlando City	Richmond, Virginia
19:00 EST	Davis IV (yellow card) 32' (goal) 53'; Asante (yellow card) 63'; Lee (yellow card) 66'; Robinson 78'; Shanosky (yellow card) 83'; Hall (yellow card) 90'	Report	Lameira 8'; Cerén (yellow card) 37'; Molino 52'; Ramos 70'; Rusin (yellow card) 83'	Stadium: City Stadium; Attendance: 3,562; Referee: (United States) Matthew Franz

August 30 26	Orange County Blues	1 - 1	Richmond Kickers	Irvine, California
22:00 EST	Hoxie 24'	Report	Yeisley 18'; Spitz (yellow card) 50'; Asante (yellow card) 70'; Conor Shanosky (red card) 87'	Stadium: Anteater Stadium; Attendance: 585; Referee: (United States) Bernhard Huso

September 1 27	LA Galaxy II	1 - 1	Richmond Kickers	Carson, California
22:30 EST	Jason Bli (yellow card) 27'; Hoffman 43'; Villarreal (yellow card) 45'	Report	Basso (yellow card) 8'; William 68' (yellow card) 87'	Stadium: StubHub Center; Attendance: 408; Referee: (United States) Denis Vargas

September 6 28	Orlando City	1 - 0	Richmond Kickers	Lake Buena Vista, Florida
19:30 EST	Molino 23'; Hertzog (yellow card) 83'			Stadium: ESPN Wide World of Sports Complex; Attendance: 4,400; Referee: Rubiel Vazquez

=== U.S. Open Cup ===
May 14 Second round	RVA FC (Virginia)	1–6	(Virginia) Richmond Kickers	Richmond, Virginia
19:30 EST	Gandy (yellow card) 33'; Carroll (yellow card) 57'; Orlando 65'; Harvey (yellow card) 68'	Report	Asante 26'; Spitz 35'; Yeisley 45+2'; Hanley 62', 64'; Davis IV 88'	Stadium: Sports Backers Stadium; Attendance: 753; Referee: Charles Carson

May 28 Third round	Richmond Kickers (Virginia)	2–1	(New York City) New York Greek American	Richmond, Virginia
19:30 EST	Davis IV 48'; Yomby 81'	Report	Megaloudis 21'	Stadium: City Stadium

June 18 Fourth round	Richmond Kickers (Virginia)	2–3	(Massachusetts) New England Revolution	Richmond, Virginia
19:30 EST	Davis IV 24'; Delicâte 74'	Report	McCarthy 8'; Neumann 35'; Mullins 39'	Stadium: City Stadium

=== Exhibitions ===
July 1	Richmond Kickers (United States)	1–1	Mexico U-23	Richmond, Virginia
19:30 EST	Roberts	Report	Tamay	Stadium: City Stadium

July 28	Richmond Kickers (United States)	0–3	(England) Crystal Palace	Richmond, Virginia
19:30 EST		Report	Ramage 35'; Murray 52'; Chamakh 70'	Stadium: City Stadium; Attendance: 7,851; Referee: Matt Gorak
