= 2017 Orange County SC season =

Orange County SC
2017 season
- Owner: James Keston
- Head coach: Logan Pause
- Stadium: Champion Stadium
- USL: Conference: 10th
- USL Cup: DNQ
- U.S. Open Cup: Fourth round
- Highest home attendance: 4,963 (8/18 v. PHX)
- Lowest home attendance: 1,539 (8/25 v. OKC)
- Average home league attendance: 2,575
- Biggest win: OC 4–0 LA (5/6); OC 4–0 RGV (7/22)
- Biggest defeat: SAC 4–0 OC (4/1); TUL 4–0 OC (5/13); OC 0–4 COL (8/8)
Home colors	Away colors

The 2017 Orange County SC season was the club's seventh season of existence, their third in the United Soccer League, and their first in the second tier of American soccer. This was the club's first year being branded as Orange County SC after previously being known as Orange County Blues FC from 2014 through 2017 and the LA Blues from 2011 to 2014.

== Background ==
Playing the first season as Orange County SC, the team finished with a record of 11-11-10, 6-6-4 at home. The team played their first four games away due to the ongoing construction of their temporary stadium at Orange County Great Park, while Championship Soccer Stadium was under construction. The first home game was week 7, May 6, 2017, against LA Galaxy II, resulting in a 4-0 Orange County victory. Due to insufficient lighting in the temporary field games started at 5:00 pm PST.

The first game played in the new Championship Soccer Stadium was August 5, 2017, against Tulsa Roughnecks ending in a scoreless draw.

The team finished the season in 10th place in the Western Conference and did not qualify for playoffs, three points behind Sacramento Republic FC in 8th place.

OCSC played three away games for the US Open Cup, defeating FC Golden State Force (5-2) and LA Wolves FC (1-0), before losing to LA Galaxy (1-3) at Dignity Health Sports stadium.

At the conclusion of the season, Head Coach Logan Pause was released, announced Nov 27.

== Transfers ==
=== In ===
No.	Pos	Player	Transferred From	Fee	Date	Source
1	GK	(United States) Charlie Lyon	(United States) Seattle Sounders FC	Free	February 15, 2017	
2	DF	(United States) Oscar Sorto	(United States) LA Galaxy	Free	February 9, 2017	
3	DF	(United States) Joe Franco	(United States) Miami FC	Free	February 19, 2017	
4	DF	(United States) Beto Navarro	(United States) Jacksonville Armada FC	Free	March 7, 2017	
6	DF	(United States) Victor Pineda	(United States) Fort Lauderdale Strikers	Free	February 11, 2017	
8	FW	(United States) Gustavo Villalobos	(United States) Tulsa Roughnecks FC	Free	January 28, 2017	
11	MF	(Netherlands) Jerry van Ewijk	(Netherlands) Go Ahead Eagles	Free	January 21, 2017	
12	MF	(United States) Sola Abolaji	(United States) Ventura County Fusion	Free	March 3, 2017	
16	MF	(United States) Amirgy Pineda	(United States) SCC Hawks	Free	February 19, 2017	
18	FW	(United States) Duke Lacroix	(United States) Indy Eleven	Free	March 15, 2017	
19	FW	(Cape Verde) Totti	(United States) UMass Lowell River Hawks	Free	April 7, 2017	
22	MF	(United States) Kevin Jeon	(Germany) Blau-Weiß Friesdorf	Free	January 28, 2017	
23	MF	(United States) Zach Kobayashi	(Croatia) Dinamo Zegreb	Free	April 20, 2017	
25	GK	(United States) Casey Beyers	(United States) Wisconsin Badgers	Free	March 3, 2017	
26	GK	(United States) Michael Suchy	(United States) Orange County SC U-23	Free	April 20, 2017	

=== Loan in ===
No.	Pos	Player	Loaned From	Start	End	Source
5	GK	(Mexico) Salomón Wbias	(Mexico) Pachuca	February 2, 2017	November 30, 2017	
9	MF	(Nigeria) Monday Etim	(United States) Los Angeles FC	May 5, 2017	November 30, 2017	
10	MF	(United States) Carlos Alvarez	(United States) Los Angeles FC	March 23, 2017	November 30, 2017	
13	DF	(United States) Juan Pablo Ocegueda	(Mexico) UANL	January 28, 2017	November 30, 2017	

== Club ==
No.	Position	Nation	Player
1	GK	USA	Charlie Lyon
2	DF	USA	Oscar Sorto
3	DF	USA	Joe Franco
4	DF	USA	Beto Navarro
5	DF	MEX	Salomón Wbias (on loan from Pachuca)
6	MF	USA	Victor Pineda
7	MF	ENG	Richard Chaplow
8	FW	USA	Gustavo Villalobos
9	MF	NGR	Monday Etim
10	MF	USA	Carlos Alvarez
11	FW	NED	Jerry van Ewijk
12	DF	USA	Sola Abolaji
13	DF	USA	Juan Pablo Ocegueda (on loan from UANL)
14	MF	SRB	Dušan Stevanović
16	MF	USA	Ami Pineda
17	DF	BEL	Roy Meeus
18	FW	USA	Duke Lacroix
19	FW	CPV	Wuilito Fernandes
20	DF	CMR	Jeannot Esua
22	MF	USA	Kevin Jeon
23	MF	USA	Zach Kobayashi
25	GK	USA	Casey Beyers
26	GK	USA	Michael Suchy
28	MF	NED	Frank Olijve
38	FW	USA	Irvin Parra
44	MF	ENG	James Baxendale

Signed to first team contract with MLS affiliate Los Angeles FC.

Preseason exhibitions

February 25, 2017	Loyola Marymount Lions	1–4	Orange County SC	Los Angeles, California
1:00 PM PST		Report		Stadium: Sullivan Field

March 3, 2017	Cal State Northridge Matadors	0–1	Orange County SC	Northridge, California
7:00 PM PST		Report		Stadium: Performance Soccer Field

March 10, 2017	Orange County SC	3–0	Phoenix Rising FC	Irvine, California
11:00 AM PST		Report		Stadium: Orange County Great Park

March 15, 2017	Orange County SC	3–1	Real Monarchs	Irvine, California
12:00 PM UTC-8		Report		Stadium: Orange County Great Park

March 18, 2017	LA Galaxy II	0–4	Orange County SC	Carson, California
4:00 PM PST		Report		Stadium: StubHub Center

== Competitive ==
=== USL ===
==== Table ====
Pos	Team	Pld	W	D	L	GF	GA	GD	Pts	Qualification
6	OKC Energy FC	32	14	7	11	46	41	+5	49	Conference Playoffs
7	Tulsa Roughnecks	32	14	4	14	46	49	−3	46	Conference Playoffs
8	Sacramento Republic	32	13	7	12	45	43	+2	46	Conference Playoffs
9	Colorado Springs Switchbacks	32	12	8	12	55	51	+4	44	
10	Orange County SC	32	11	10	11	43	47	−4	43	
11	Rio Grande Valley Toros	32	9	8	15	37	50	−13	35	
12	Seattle Sounders 2	32	9	4	19	42	61	−19	31	
13	LA Galaxy II	32	8	5	19	32	64	−32	29	
14	Vancouver Whitecaps 2	32	5	9	18	32	52	−20	24	

Source: 2017 USL standings
Rules for classification: 1) total wins; 2) total goal differential; 3) total goals scored; 4) points earned against top four Conference finishers; 5) disciplinary points; 6) coin toss or drawing of lots

==== Results summary ====
Overall								Home						Away					
Pld	W	D	L	GF	GA	GD	Pts	W	D	L	GF	GA	GD	W	D	L	GF	GA	GD
32	11	10	11	43	47	−4	43	6	4	6	26	25	+1	5	6	5	17	22	−5

==== Results by round ====
Round	1	2	3	4	5	6	7	8	9	10	11	12	13	14	15	16	17	18	19	20	21	22	23	24	25	26	27	28	29	30	31	32
Stadium	A	A	A	A	H	A	A	H	H	H	H	A	A	H	H	A	A	H	A	H	H	H	H	A	H	H	A	A	A	H	H	A
Result	W	L	W	D	W	L	L	L	W	D	D	W	D	W	W	L	D	L	D	D	D	L	L	D	W	L	W	D	L	W	L	W

Updated to match(es) played on August 18, 2017. Source: USLsoccer
A = Away; H = Home; W = Win; D = Draw; L = Loss

=== Results ===
March 25, 2017 1	Reno 1868 FC	0–2	Orange County SC	Reno, Nevada
7:00 PM UTC-7		USL	Lacroix 31', 45+1'	Stadium: Greater Nevada Field; Attendance: 5691; Referee: Victor Rivas

April 1, 2017 2	Sacramento Republic FC	4–0	Orange County SC	Sacramento, California
7:30 PM UTC−7	Ochoa 23', 60'; Kneeshaw 68'; Williams 90+1'	USL		Stadium: Papa Murphy's Park; Attendance: 11569; Referee: Farhad Dadkho

April 8, 2017 3	Portland Timbers 2	1–2	Orange County SC	Portland, Oregon
7:00 PM UTC−7	Williams 19'	USL	van Ewijk 9' (pen.); Pineda 58'	Stadium: Providence Park; Attendance: 1834; Referee: Joseph Dickerson

April 22, 2017 4	LA Galaxy II	1–1	Orange County SC	Carson, California
7:30 PM UTC−7	Vera 66'	USL	Engola 49' (o.g.)	Stadium: StubHub Center; Attendance: 2225; Referee: Timothy Ford

May 6, 2017 5	Orange County SC	4–0	LA Galaxy II	Irvine, California
5:00 PM UTC−7	van Ewijk 28' (pen.), 31'; Juarez 34' (o.g.); Fernandes 59'	USL		Stadium: Orange County Great Park; Attendance: 3408; Referee: Daniel Radford

May 13, 2017 6	Tulsa Roughnecks FC	4–0	Orange County SC	Tulsa, Oklahoma
7:00 PM UTC−5	Caffa 19'; Svantesson 22', 81'; Calistri 79'	USL		Stadium: ONEOK Field; Attendance: 4119; Referee: Charles Murphy

May 20, 2017 7	OKC Energy FC	1–0	Orange County SC	Oklahoma City, Oklahoma
7:00 PM UTC−5	Dixon 35'	USL	Sorto (red card) 25'	Stadium: Taft Stadium; Attendance: 6059; Referee: Jon Freemon

June 3, 2017 8	Orange County SC	0–1	Real Monarchs	Irvine, California
5:00 PM UTC−7	Fernandes (yellow card) 10'	USL	Hoffman 1'; Gallagher (yellow card) 45+1'; Desire (yellow card) 90+1'	Stadium: Orange County Great Park; Attendance: 2113; Referee: Alejandro Mariscal

June 24, 2017 9	Orange County SC	4–3	Seattle Sounders FC 2	Irvine, California
5:00 PM UTC−7	Meeus 10' (pen.); Koontz 18' (o.g.); Alvarez 24'; Stevanovic (yellow card) 59'; Villalobos 80'	USL; OC	Grant (yellow card) 17'; Nana-Sinkam 47'; Ramos (yellow card) 64'; Mathers 72' (pen.); Renken 87'; Santiago (yellow card) 90+5'	Stadium: Orange County Great Park; Attendance: 2083; Referee: Joseph Dickerson

July 1, 2017 10	Orange County SC	3–3	Portland Timbers 2	Irvine, California
5:00 PM UTC-7	Alvarez 57'; Meeus 63' (pen.); Pineda (yellow card) 75'; Chaplow (yellow card) 78' van Ewijk (red card) 89'; Pineda (red card) 90'; Villalobos 90+1'	USL; OC; POR	Bijev 31', 85' (pen.), (yellow card) 78'; Cicerone 71'; Batista (red card) 89'	Stadium: Orange County Great Park; Attendance: 2127; Referee: Timothy Ford

July 8, 2017 11	Orange County SC	1–1	Phoenix Rising FC	Irvine, California
5:00 PM PDT	Etim (yellow card) 64'; Meeus (yellow card) 77', (goal) 84'	USL; OC; PHX	Timm (yellow card) 50'; Drogba (yellow card) 79', (goal) 90+4'	Stadium: Orange County Great Park; Attendance: 4554; Referee: Malik Badawi

July 16, 2017 12	Seattle Sounders FC 2	1–2	Orange County SC	Tukwila, Washington
2:00 PM PDT	Olsen 30'; Ele (yellow card) 41'; Ramos (yellow card) 65'	USL; SEA	Fernandes 16'; Etim 37'	Stadium: Starfire Sports; Attendance: 1112; Referee: Younes Marrakchi

July 19, 2017 13	Rio Grande Valley FC Toros	1–1	Orange County SC	Edinburg, Texas
7:00 PM CDT	Sagel (yellow card) 12'; Bird 27' (pen.); Garza (yellow card) 90+2'; James (red card) 90+4'	USL; RGV	Stevanovic 17'	Stadium: H-E-B Park; Attendance: 7304; Referee: Daniel Radford

July 22, 2017 14	Orange County SC	4–0	Rio Grande Valley FC Toros	Irvine, California
7:00 PM UTC-7	Esua 8'; Meeus 27' (pen.); Fernandes 82'; Kobayashi 86'	USL; RGV	Pungo (yellow card) 46'; Bird (yellow card) 58'	Stadium: Orange County Great Park; Attendance: 2014; Referee: Ramy Touchan

July 29, 2017 15	Orange County SC	1–0	Whitecaps FC 2	Irvine, California
5:00 PM PDT	Pineda 10'; Esua (yellow card) 28'	USL; OC; VAN	Gardner (yellow card) 37'	Stadium: Orange County Great Park; Attendance: 2,128; Referee: Michael Radchuk

August 2, 2017 16	LA Galaxy II	1–0	Orange County SC	Carson, California
7:30 PM PDT	Covarrubias (yellow card) 15'; Fujii 57'; Castellanos (yellow card) 82'	Report; Box Score	Ocegueda (yellow card); Fernandes (yellow card) 90+2'	Stadium: StubHub Center; Attendance: 636; Referee: Victor Rivas

August 5, 2017 17	San Antonio FC	1–1	Orange County SC	San Antonio, Texas
7:30 PM CDT	Tyrpak 2'; Castillo (yellow card) 27'; Ibeagha (yellow card) 56'; Restrepo (yellow card) 77'	USL; SAN	Baxendale (yellow card) 50' van Ewijk 90+5' (pen.)	Stadium: Toyota Field; Attendance: 6725; Referee: Robi Hullner

August 8, 2017 18	Orange County SC	0–4	Colorado Springs Switchbacks FC	Irvine, California
6:00 PM PDT	Navarro (yellow card) 63'; Chaplow (yellow card) 83'	USL; COS	Vercollone 19'; Malcolm 22'; Kacher 39'; Frater 72'	Stadium: Orange County Great Park; Attendance: 1,553; Referee: Timothy Ford

August 12, 2017 19	Swope Park Rangers	1–1	Orange County SC	Kansas City, Missouri
7:30 PM CDT	Belmar 4'; Moloto (yellow card) 36'	USL; SPR	Kobayashi 51' (yellow card) 86'; Chaplow (yellow card) 71'	Stadium: Swope Soccer Village; Attendance: 1,012; Referee: Elvis Mahmutovic

August 15, 2017 20	Orange County SC	0–0	Tulsa Roughnecks FC	Irvine, California
7:30 PM PDT	Pineda (yellow card) 36'	USL; OC; TUL	Fernandez (yellow card) 65'; Ayala (yellow card) 90+3'	Stadium: Champion Stadium; Attendance: 1,543; Referee: Daniel Radford

August 18, 2017 21	Orange County SC	1–1	Phoenix Rising FC	Irvine, California
7:30 PM PDT	Chaplow (yellow card) 16'; Abolaji 89'	USL; OC; PHX	Cortez 18'; Gray (red card) 43'	Stadium: Orange County Great Park; Attendance: 4,963; Referee: Joseph Dickerson

August 25, 2017 22	Orange County SC	1–2	OKC Energy FC	Irvine, California
7:30 PM PDT	Meeus (yellow card) 28' van Ewijk 65'; Fernandes (yellow card) 66'; Sorto (yellow card) 75'; Abolaji (yellow card) 79'	USL	Dixon 35'; Barril (yellow card) 39'; Franco 53' (o.g.); Angulo (yellow card) 63'; Daly (yellow card) 77'	Stadium: Orange County Great Park; Attendance: 1539; Referee: Marco Vega

September 2, 2017 23	Orange County SC	1–3	Reno 1868 FC	Irvine, California
7:00 PM PDT	Sorto (yellow card) 11'; Parra (yellow card) 35'; Kobayashi (yellow card) 48'; Abolaji (red card) 56'; Etim 90+1'	USL; OC; RNO	Ockford 13'; Sorto 15' (o.g.); Murrell (yellow card) 37'; Wehan 67'	Stadium: Orange County Great Park; Attendance: 2,017; Referee: Alex Chilowicz

September 6, 2017 24	Phoenix Rising FC	0–0	Orange County SC	Tempe, Arizona
7:00 PM MST		Report; Box Score	Chaplow (yellow card) 63'	Stadium: Phoenix Rising FC Soccer Complex; Attendance: 4536; Referee: Baboucarr Jallow

September 9, 2017 25	Orange County SC	2–1	Swope Park Rangers	Irvine, California
7:00 PM PDT	van Ewijk 43' (pen.); Parra 65'; Fernandes (yellow card) 89'	Report; Box Score	Doyle (yellow card) 34'; Belmar 46'; Selbol (yellow card) 84'	Stadium: Orange County Great Park; Attendance: 2,419; Referee: Ramy Touchan

September 13, 2017 26	Orange County SC	0–1	San Antonio FC	Irvine, California
7:30 PM PDT	Sorto (yellow card) 54'	Report; Box Score	Newnam 55'; Elizondo (yellow card) 61'; Tyrpak (yellow card) 68'; McCarthy (yellow card) 85'	Stadium: Orange County Great Park; Attendance: 1857; Referee: Alejandro Mariscal

September 17, 2017 27	Whitecaps FC 2	1–2	Orange County SC	University Endowment Lands
4:00 PM UTC−7	Bustos 55'	USL; OC; VAN	Kobayashi 40' van Ewijk 83'	Stadium: Thunderbird Stadium; Attendance: 1,244; Referee: David Gantar

September 22, 2017 28	Real Monarchs	0–0	Orange County SC	Sandy, Utah
7:00 PM MDT	Peay (yellow card) 23'; Cruz (yellow card) 45+2'	Report; Box Score	Alvarez (yellow card) 59'; Sorto (yellow card) 88'	Stadium: Rio Tinto Stadium; Attendance: 1,772; Referee: Victor Rivas

September 30, 2017 29	Colorado Springs Switchbacks FC	2–1	Orange County SC	Colorado Springs, Colorado
6:00 PM UTC-6	Tae-seong 22'; Frater 28' (yellow card) 31'; Phillips (yellow card) 45'	USL; OC; COS	Pineda (yellow card) 24'; Parra 55'	Stadium: Weidner Field; Attendance: 3059; Referee: Jacob Meyer

October 4, 2017 30	Orange County SC	3–1	Sacramento Republic FC	Irvine, California
7:30 PM UTC-7	Pacheco 27'; Stevanovic 80' van Ewijk 90+3'	USL; OC; SAC	Ochoa 43'; Kiffe (yellow card) 86'	Stadium: Orange County Great Park; Attendance: 1879; Referee: Alex Chilowicz

October 7, 2017 31	Orange County SC	1–4	Reno 1868 FC	Irvine, California
7:30 PM PDT	Kobayashi (yellow card) 57'; Parra 71'	Report; Box Score	Ockford 30'; Fernandes 65'; Wehan 81' (pen.) (yellow card) 89'; Pridham 85'; Mfeka (yellow card) 90+2'	Stadium: Orange County Great Park; Attendance: 4,229; Referee: Joseph Dickerson

October 13, 2017 32	Whitecaps FC 2	3–4	Orange County SC	University Endowment Lands
7:00 PM UTC−7	Bevan 15'; Norman 43', (yellow card) 82'; Chung 62'; Baldisimo (yellow card) 90+1'	USL; OC; VAN; Box Score	Parra 41', 76'; Kobayashi 63'; Pineda (yellow card) 78'; Jeon (yellow card) 85'	Stadium: Thunderbird Stadium; Attendance: 618; Referee: Darnell Smith

=== U.S. Open Cup ===
May 17 Second round	FC Golden State Force (California)	2–5	(California) Orange County SC	Glendora, California
7:00 PM PDT	Verso 20' (pen.), 47'	Report	Pineda 6'; Etim 15' van Ewijk 26' (pen.); Totti 46', 55'; Wbias (red card) 73'	Stadium: Citrus College; Referee: Ceciah Valero

May 31 Third round	L.A. Wolves FC (California)	0–1	(California) Orange County SC	Azusa, California
7:30 PM PDT			Meeus 41'	Stadium: Azusa Pacific University; Attendance: 500; Referee: Michael Radchuk

June 14 Fourth round	LA Galaxy (California)	3–1	(California) Orange County SC	Carson, California
7:30 PM PDT	Villarreal 7'; McBean 36' (pen.); Lassiter 73'	Report	Meeus 26'	Stadium: Stubhub Center Track Stadium; Attendance: 2408; Referee: Ramy Touchan; Assistant referees: Cameron Blanchard; Salma Pérez; Fourth official: Michael Radchuk

== Statistics ==
=== Goalscorers ===
Rank	Position	Player	Appearances	Goals
1	MF	(United States) Irvin Parra	30	11
2	MF	(Netherlands) Jerry van Ewijk	29	8
3	MF	(United States) Zach Kobayashi	17	4
3	MF	(Belgium) Roy Meeus	19	4

=== Assists ===
Rank	Position	Player	Appearances	Assists
1	MF	(United States) Irvin Parra	30	10
2	FW	(Cape Verde) Wuilito Fernandes	25	3
2	MF	(Netherlands) Jerry van Ewijk	29	3
4	MF	(United States) Carlos Alvarez	19	2

=== Clean sheets ===
Position	Player	Appearances	Saves	Clean sheets
GK	(United States) Charlie Lyon	31	95	7
