= Dušan Stevanović =

Dušan Stevanović may refer to:

- Dusan Stevanovic (footballer, born 1992), Serbian football midfielder
- Dušan Stevanović (footballer, born 1996), Serbian football centre-back
