= Thomas Juel-Nielsen =

Danish footballer (born 1990)

Personal information
- Full name: Thomas Juel-Nielsen
- Date of birth: 18 June 1990 (age 36)
- Place of birth: Denmark
- Height: 1.89 m (6 ft 2 1/2 in)
- Position: Centre back

Youth career
- Lyngby BK

Senior career*
Years	Team	Apps	(Gls)
2009–2010	Hvidovre IF		
2010–2013	AB	63	(4)
2013–2015	Sandefjord	58	(3)
2016	Falkenbergs FF	28	(4)
2017	AGF	6	(2)
2018	Orange County SC	17	(1)
2019	SønderjyskE	3	(1)
2019–2020	Gaz Metan Mediaș	5	(1)

International career
2006–2007	Denmark U17	7	(2)
- * Club domestic league appearances and goals as of 14:46, 22 June 2020 (UTC)

Thomas Juel-Nielsen (born 18 June 1990) is a Danish footballer who plays as a centre back.

== Club career ==
In August 2013, Juel-Nielsen signed for Sandefjord Fotball until the end of the 2013 season. In 2016, he moved to Falkenbergs FF.

In June 2017, after a brief stint at AGF, Juel-Nielsen signed for Maccabi Netanya in the Israeli Premier League. The following month, however, he left the club.

On 14 February 2018, Juel-Nielsen signed with the Orange County SC of the United Soccer League. On 1 March 2019, Juel-Nielsen moved back to Denmark, signing for SønderjyskE. He left at the end of the season.

On 24 October 2019, Juel-Nielsen signed a one-year contract with a one-year extension option with Liga I club Gaz Metan Mediaș.

== International career ==
Juel-Nielsen is a Danish youth international, having represented the Denmark U17 team 7 times, scoring twice, between 2006 and 2007.

== Career statistics ==
=== Club ===
As of 16 September 2018

Appearances and goals by club, season and competition
Club	Season	League			National Cup		Other		Total	
Club	Season	Division	Apps	Goals	Apps	Goals	Apps	Goals	Apps	Goals
AB	2010–11	1. Division	24	1	0	0	–		24	1
AB	2011–12	1. Division	13	1	0	0	–		13	1
AB	2012–13	1. Division	26	2	0	0	–		26	2
AB	Total		63	4	0	0	0	0	63	4
Sandefjord	2013	Adeccoligaen	13	1	0	0	–		13	1
Sandefjord	2014	1. divisjon	25	2	2	0	–		27	2
Sandefjord	2015	Tippeligaen	20	0	4	0	–		24	0
Sandefjord	Total		58	3	6	0	0	0	64	3
Falkenberg	2016	Allsvenskan	28	4	2	0	–		30	4
AGF	2016-17	Superligaen	6	2	1	0	4	0	11	2
Orange County SC	2018	USL	17	1	1	0	0	0	18	1
Career total			172	14	10	0	4	0	186	14

== Honours ==
Sandefjord

- 1. divisjon (1): 2014
