= Joe Willis (American soccer) =

American soccer player (born 1988)

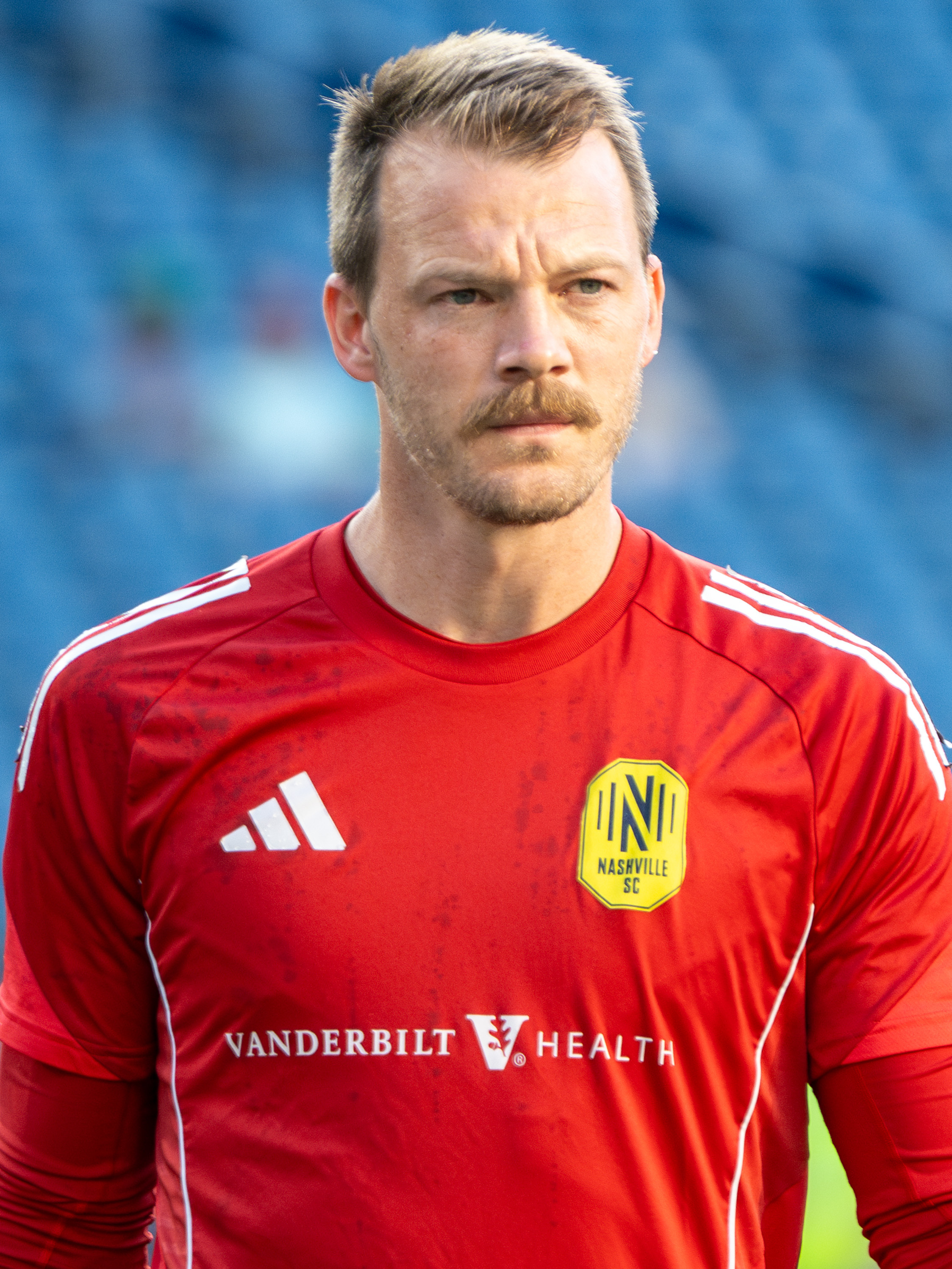
- Willis with Nashville SC in 2025

Personal information
- Full name: Joseph Mark Willis
- Date of birth: August 10, 1988 (age 38)
- Place of birth: St. Louis, Missouri, U.S.
- Height: 6 ft 5 in (1.96 m)
- Position: Goalkeeper

Team information
- Current team: Nashville SC
- Number: 1

College career
Years	Team	Apps	(Gls)
2006–2010	Denver Pioneers	53	(0)

Senior career*
Years	Team	Apps	(Gls)
2009–2010	Real Colorado Foxes	7	(0)
2011–2014	D.C. United	23	(0)
2014	→ Richmond Kickers (loan)	18	(0)
2015–2019	Houston Dynamo	90	(0)
2020–	Nashville SC	186	(0)
- * Club domestic league appearances and goals as of 05:26, November 2, 2026 (UTC)

Joseph Mark Willis (born August 10, 1988) is an American professional soccer player who plays as a goalkeeper for Major League Soccer club Nashville SC.

== Early career ==
Willis played high school soccer for Chaminade College Preparatory in St. Louis. Willis played soccer for University of Denver from 2006 to 2010, serving as the starter from 2008 to 2010. He was named the team's Most Valuable Player in 2008, and was named All-MPSF from 2008 to 2010. While at Denver, he also played for the USL Premier Development League Real Colorado Foxes.

== Professional career ==
=== D.C. United ===
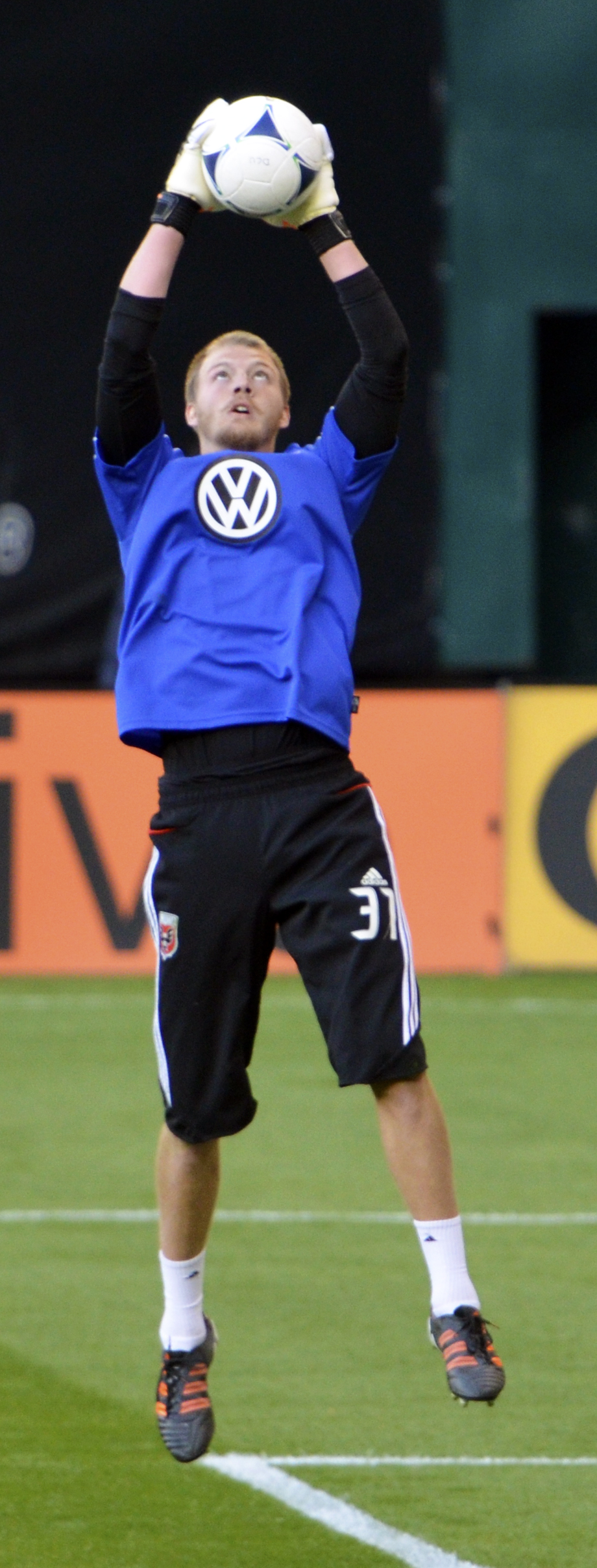
Willis training before a DC United game in 2012

Willis was selected by D.C. United with the 50th pick in the third round of the 2011 MLS SuperDraft, and he signed a contract with the team on March 16, 2011. Willis served as the backup goalie with Bill Hamid being the first choice goalie. He made his MLS debut on August 13, 2011, recording a clean sheet in a 4–0 victory over Vancouver Whitecaps FC. Willis made only 3 appearances in his first season.

For 2012, Willis became first choice goalkeeper while Bill Hamid was with the US U23 team for Olympic qualifying. However Hamid retook the starting job on May 5, 2012, after Willis had made 9 starts. On November 8, 2012, Willis came on as a substitute in a MLS Playoff match against New York Red Bulls after Hamid received a red card. He denied Kenny Cooper from the spot on the striker's second attempt (the first penalty kick that was successfully converted by Cooper was retaken due to an infringement by Cooper's teammates) and managed to keep a clean sheet to help D.C. United get a 1–0 win, advancing them to the next Eastern Conference Finals. With Hamid suspended, Willis started the next match. However, this time he couldn't replicate his heroics as D.C. United fell to the Houston Dynamo 3–1. Hamid returned for the second leg, but D.C. United drew 1–1 and was eliminated.

Willis remained the second choice goalie for 2013, only getting an extended run of games while Bill Hamid was with the United States national team for the 2013 CONCACAF Gold Cup. Willis made 5 starts before Hamid retook the starting job on August 10. Willis enjoyed success in the 2013 U.S. Open Cup. On May 28 he saved 2 penalties against the Richmond Kickers as D.C. United won on penalties. Willis helped lead D.C. United to 3 more wins, including a clean sheet in the semi-finals, a 2–0 win over the Chicago Fire. Despite his strong performances in the tournament, Willis was replaced by Hamid for the final. D.C. United defeated Real Salt Lake in the final 1–0.

In 2014, Willis became third choice goalkeeper after losing his spot as the number 2 to Andrew Dykstra in preseason. Willis was sent on loan to D.C. United's USL affiliate, the Richmond Kickers. His first appearance of the season with D.C. United came in a CONCACAF Champions League match against Waterhouse on August 20, a 1–0 win for D.C. United. Willis made 2 more appearances in the Champions League, both of them clean sheets against Tauro FC.

=== Houston Dynamo ===
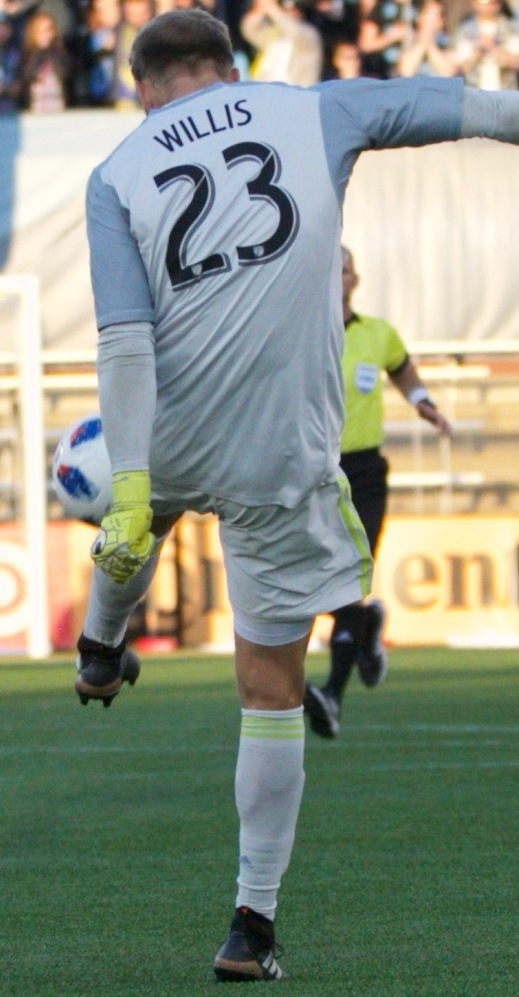
Joe Willis playing for the Houston Dynamo in 2018

On December 8, 2014, Willis was traded to the Houston Dynamo along with Samuel Inkoom, in exchange for the rights for Andrew Driver (who moved to Europe and didn't play for D.C.) and a fourth-round pick in the 2016 MLS SuperDraft. On December 19, 2014, he signed a contract with the Dynamo. Willis served as the backup to Tyler Deric for 2015 and appeared in only six games in his first year with Houston.

Willis got a chance to play early in 2016 with Deric missing time for an abdominal injury. Deric returned in week 6, but he picked up a red card, with Willis coming in as a sub and starting the next game as Deric served his suspension. Willis came in for Deric again on May 15 as Deric served a suspension for another red card. Willis picked up his first career assist in the game when he hit a long goal kick that Giles Barnes ran onto and converted to score the game winning goal over Real Salt Lake. Willis would fill in for Deric as he missed time with another abdominal injury and an elbow injury. He performed well, winning MLS Save of the Week for a stop against the San Jose Earthquakes on August 19. He also made the MLS Team of the Week for that game. He ended the season with 5 clean sheets from 26 MLS appearances. Willis's strong performances saw him named the Dynamo defensive player of the year. Despite his good play, the Dynamo missed the playoffs again.

Willis missed the start of the 2017 season due to a knee injury. He returned on April 15 and made 7 consecutive starts before head coach Wilmer Cabrera gave the starting job to Deric. Willis became the number 1 goalie during the playoffs after Deric was arrested and subsequently suspended by the MLS. He would help the Dynamo defeat the Portland Timbers 2–1 on aggregate and reach the Western Conference finals, where the Dynamo fell to Seattle Sounders FC.

Ahead of the 2018 season, Willis re-signed with the Dynamo. Off-season addition Chris Seitz started the year as first choice keeper. Willis would retake the starting job on April 21 and keep it for the rest of the season. He enjoyed a strong performance on July 21, saving a penalty kick and being named to the MLS Team of the Week after helping the Dynamo get a 1–1 draw against rival FC Dallas. The Dynamo would miss out on the playoffs in 2018, but they enjoyed success in the US Open Cup. Willis started the Open Cup semifinal match up with LAFC on August 8 as the Dynamo won on penalties. Willis kept a clean sheet in the final to help Houston defeat the Philadelphia Union 3–0 as the Dynamo won their first Open Cup in club history.

Willis began 2019 as the club's first choice keeper. He played in every game of the CONCACAF Champions League as the Dynamo reached the quarterfinals. After making a couple of costly errors in some games in mid-season, Deric got a run of 5 starts starting on July 17. Willis returned on August 11, a 2–1 loss to the Union. He started the next 8 matches before sitting the final 2 of the season in favor of Deric. It was another disappointing league campaign for Houston, failing to qualify for the playoffs for the second straight season.

=== Nashville SC ===
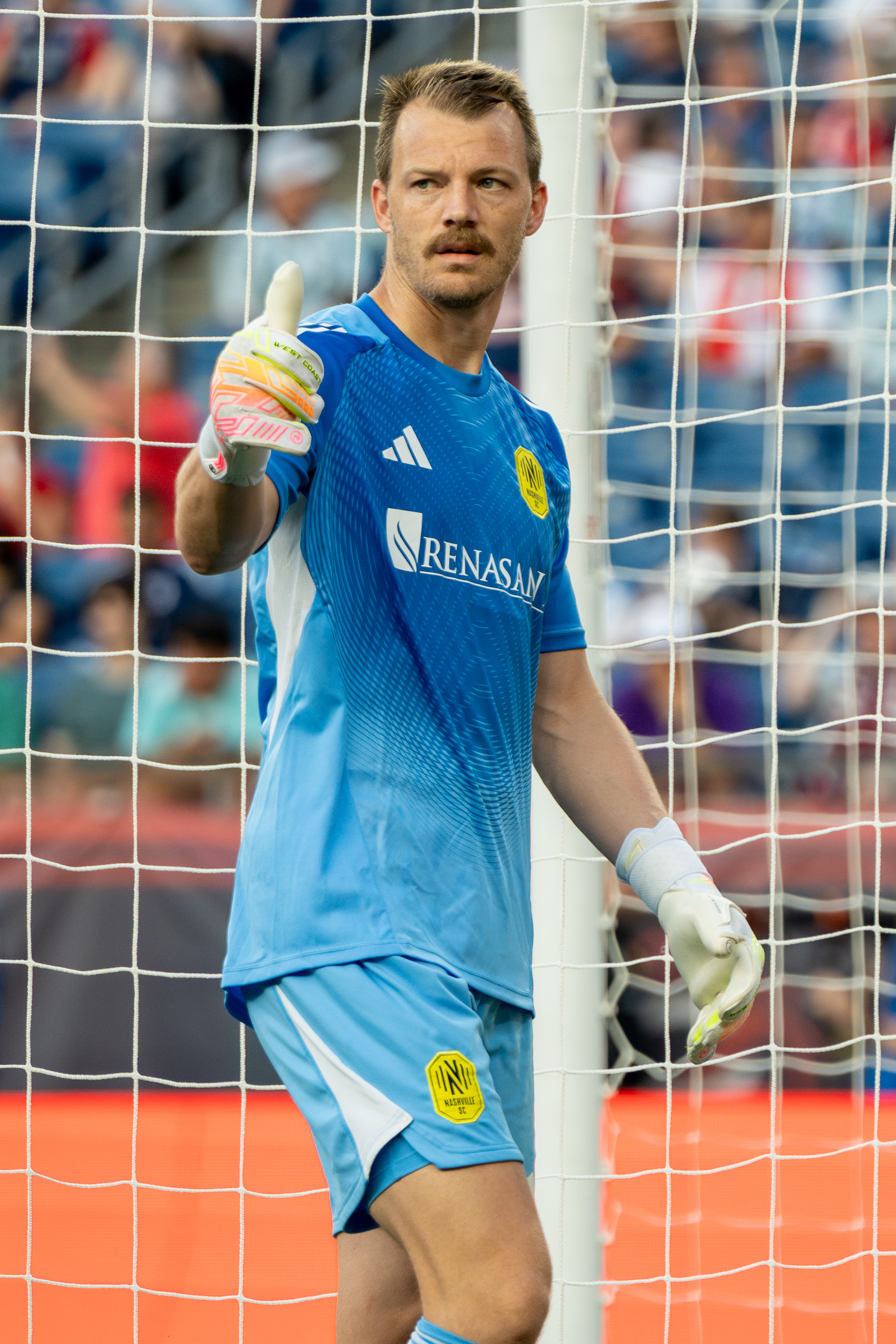
Willis playing for Nashville SC in 2025

On November 19, 2019, Willis was traded to Major League Soccer expansion side Nashville SC in exchange for Zarek Valentin. He made his debut for Nashville on February 29 in Nashville's first ever MLS game, a 2–1 loss to Atlanta United FC. In a shortened season due to the COVID-19 pandemic, Willis made 23 appearances, out of a possible 23, and kept a league best 9 clean sheets. He also was named to the MLS Team of the Week twice during the season. Willis led a Nashville defense that conceded the 3rd fewest goals in MLS, leading the team to a 7th place finish in the Eastern Conference and qualifying for the playoffs. In Nashville's first ever playoff game, Willis kept a clean sheet to help defeat Inter Miami CF 3–0. He kept another clean sheet in their next match as they defeated Toronto FC 1–0 in extra time. In the conference semifinals, Nashville and Willis lost to the Columbus Crew 2–0 in extra time.

On October 29, 2026, Nashville SC announced that Willis would be retiring from professional soccer at the end of the season.

== Career statistics ==
As of match played October 6, 2025

Appearances and goals by club, season and competition
Club	Season	League			National cup		Playoffs		Continental		Other		Total	
Club	Season	Division	Apps	Goals	Apps	Goals	Apps	Goals	Apps	Goals	Apps	Goals	Apps	Goals
Real Colorado Foxes	2009	USL PDL	5	0	—		0	0	—		—		5	0
Real Colorado Foxes	2010	USL PDL	2	0	—		—		—		—		2	0
Real Colorado Foxes	Total		7	0	—		0	0	—		—		7	0
D.C. United	2011	MLS	3	0	0	0	—		—		—		3	0
D.C. United	2012	MLS	11	0	1	0	2	0	—		—		14	0
D.C. United	2013	MLS	9	0	4	0	—		—		—		13	0
D.C. United	2014	MLS	0	0	0	0	0	0	3 (Note: Appearances in CONCACAF Champions League)	0	—		3	0
D.C. United	Total		23	0	5	0	2	0	3	0	—		33	0
Richmond Kickers (loan)	2014	USL Pro	18	0	2	0	0	0	—		—		20	0
Houston Dynamo	2015	MLS	3	0	3	0	—		—		—		6	0
Houston Dynamo	2016	MLS	26	0	3	0	—		—		—		29	0
Houston Dynamo	2017	MLS	8	0	2	0	3	0	—		—		13	0
Houston Dynamo	2018	MLS	26	0	2	0	—		—		—		28	0
Houston Dynamo	2019	MLS	27	0	0	0	—		4	0	1 (Note: Appearances in Leagues Cup)	0	32	0
Houston Dynamo	Total		90	0	10	0	3	0	4	0	1	0	108	0
Nashville SC	2020	MLS	23	0	—		3	0	—		—		26	0
Nashville SC	2021	MLS	34	0	—		2	0	—		—		36	0
Nashville SC	2022	MLS	32	0	1	0	1	0	—		—		34	0
Nashville SC	2023	MLS	32	0	0	0	2	0	—		3	0	37	0
Nashville SC	2024	MLS	30	0	—		—		3 (Note: Appearances in CONCACAF Champions Cup)	0	2	0	35	0
Nashville SC	Total		151	0	1	0	8	0	3	0	5	0	168	0
Career Total			271	0	16	0	13	0	10	0	6	0	316	0

== Honors ==
D.C. United

- U.S. Open Cup: 2013

Houston Dynamo

- U.S. Open Cup: 2018

Nashville SC

- U.S. Open Cup: 2025

Individual

- USL Pro All-League Second Team: 2014
- Dynamo Defensive Player of the Year: 2016
- Dynamo Humanitarian of the Year: 2018
