= Koji Hashimoto (footballer) =

Japanese footballer (born 1986)

Personal information
- Date of birth: 22 April 1986 (age 40)
- Place of birth: Kanazawa, Ishikawa, Japan
- Height: 1.78 m (5 ft 10 in)
- Position: Midfielder

Team information
- Current team: Suzuka Point Getters
- Number: 10

Youth career
- Kanazawa Minami SSS
- –2001: Geminis Kanazawa FC
- 2002–2004: Seiryo High School

College career
Years	Team	Apps	(Gls)
2005–2008	Meiji University		

Senior career*
Years	Team	Apps	(Gls)
2006–2007	Nagoya Grampus Eight	1	(0)
2009–2011	Nagoya Grampus	4	(0)
2012–2013	Mito HollyHock	77	(18)
2014	Omiya Ardija	16	(2)
2015–2016	Kawasaki Frontale	9	(0)
2017	Mito HollyHock	36	(3)
2018–2019	Orange County SC	29	(2)
2020	Iwate Grulla Morioka	14	(1)
2021–	Suzuka Point Getters	31	(6)
Medal record
Nagoya Grampus
Winner	J1 League	2010
Runner-up	J1 League	2011
Runner-up	Emperor's Cup	2009
Kawasaki Frontale
Runner-up	Emperor's Cup	2016
- * Club domestic league appearances and goals as of 1 October 2022

Koji Hashimoto (橋本 晃司, Hashimoto Kōji; born on 22 April 1986 in Kanazawa, Ishikawa) is a Japanese football player currently playing for Suzuka Point Getters in the Japan Football League. He is currently the club's captain.

== Career statistics ==
Updated to 1 October 2022.

Club performance			League		Cup		League Cup		Continental		Total	
Season	Club	League	Apps	Goals	Apps	Goals	Apps	Goals	Apps	Goals	Apps	Goals
Japan			League		Emperor's Cup		League Cup		AFC		Total	
2006	Nagoya Grampus Eight	J1 League	1	0	0	0	0	0	-		1	0
2007	Nagoya Grampus Eight	J1 League	0	0	0	0	1	0	-		1	0
2009	Nagoya Grampus	J1 League	1	0	0	0	0	0	1	0	2	0
2010	Nagoya Grampus	J1 League	0	0	4	0	3	0	-		7	0
2011	Nagoya Grampus	J1 League	3	0	2	0	2	1	2	0	9	1
2012	Mito HollyHock	J2 League	38	6	0	0	-		-		38	6
2013	Mito HollyHock	J2 League	39	12	0	0	-		-		39	12
2014	Omiya Ardija	J1 League	16	2	0	0	6	2	-		22	4
2015	Kawasaki Frontale	J1 League	2	0	1	0	4	0	-		7	0
2016	Kawasaki Frontale	J1 League	7	0	1	0	5	1	-		13	1
2017	Mito HollyHock	J2 League	36	3	0	0	–		–		36	3
2018	Orange County SC	USL	21	1	1	0	–		–		22	1
2019	Orange County SC	USL	6	0	0	0	–		–		6	0
2020	Iwate Grulla Morioka	J3 League	14	0	0	0	–		–		14	0
2021	Suzuka Point Getters	Japan Football League	20	4	2	0	–		–		22	4
2022	Suzuka Point Getters	Japan Football League	11	2	2	0	–		–		13	2
Career total			215	30	13	0	21	4	3	0	252	34
