= Ayao Sossou =

Togolese footballer

Personal information
- Full name: Ayao Amen Sossou
- Date of birth: May 24, 1990 (age 36)
- Place of birth: Lomé, Togo
- Height: 5 ft 8 in (1.73 m)
- Position: Defender

College career
| Years | Team | Apps | (Gls) |
| 2008–2010 | VMI Keydets | | |

Senior career*
| Years | Team | Apps | (Gls) |
| 2011 | I-Kissat | 10 | (1) |
| 2013 | TPV | 10 | (1) |
| 2014 | Rochester Rhinos | 1 | (0) |
| 2016–2018 | Tormenta FC | 37 | (2) |
| 2018 | Tormenta FC 2 | 12 | (0) |
- * Club domestic league appearances and goals as of 23 September 2021

Ayao Amen Sossou (born May 24, 1990) is a Togolese footballer.

== Career ==
=== College and amateur ===
Sossou played three years of college soccer at Virginia Military Institute between 2008 and 2010.

=== Professional ===
Sossou spent 2011 with Finnish club I-Kissat and 2013, again in Finland, with TPV. Sossou returned to the United States on January 30, 2014, when he joined USL Pro club Rochester Rhinos. For the 2016 season, Sossou joined PDL expansion team, Tormenta FC, becoming the first ever player to sign with the club, where he played for three seasons.
