= Mickael Oliveira =

Brazilian footballer

Personal information
- Full name: Mickael Luis Oliveira Barroso
- Date of birth: 5 February 1992 (age 34)
- Place of birth: São Luís, Brazil
- Height: 5 ft 10 in (1.78 m)
- Position: Forward

Youth career
- 2008–2009: RAEC Mons
- 2010–2011: UR La Louvière Centre

Senior career*
Years	Team	Apps	(Gls)
2011–2012	UR La Louvière Centre	3	(0)
2013–2014	Wilmington Hammerheads	20	(4)
2015	RES Couvin-Mariembourg		
- * Club domestic league appearances and goals as of May 1, 2014

Mickael Luis Oliveira Barroso (born February 5, 1992, in São Luís, Brazil) is a Brazilian footballer.

== Career ==
Oliveira played for USL Pro side Wilmington Hammerheads before the club released him in July 2014.

He is the son of former Belgian International, and former player of R.S.C. Anderlecht, Cagliari Calcio, ACF Fiorentina and Bologna F.C. 1909, Luis Oliveira.
