= Giovanni Ramos-Godoy =

American soccer player (born 1995)

Personal information
- Date of birth: April 15, 1995 (age 31)
- Place of birth: Watsonville, California, United States
- Height: 6 ft 0 in (1.83 m)
- Position: Forward

Youth career
- Santa Cruz Breakers

College career
Years	Team	Apps	(Gls)
2013	Cal State Bakersfield Roadrunners	20	(2)
2016–2017	UC Irvine Anteaters	37	(16)

Senior career*
Years	Team	Apps	(Gls)
2018–2019	Orange County SC	51	(6)
2020	FC Tucson	15	(3)
2021	Stumptown AC	10	(1)
- * Club domestic league appearances and goals as of 21:22, 28 July 2021 (UTC)

Giovanni Ramos-Godoy (born April 15, 1995) is an American soccer player.

== Career ==
=== College and amateur ===
Ramos-Godoy began playing college soccer at California State University, Bakersfield in 2013, before transferring in 2016 to University of California, Irvine where he played for two years and in 2017 was named Big West Conference Offensive Player of the Year.

=== Professional ===
On March 12, 2018, Ramos-Godoy signed with United Soccer League side Orange County SC.

In April 2021, Ramos-Godoy joined National Independent Soccer Association side Stumptown AC ahead of the spring 2021 season. After making nine appearances, including three in the Legend's Cup tournament, the team announced his departure on July 19.
