= Matheau Hall =

American soccer player

Dupe Hall
Personal information
- Full name: Matheau Hall
- Date of birth: July 27, 1987 (age 39)
- Place of birth: Virginia Beach, Virginia, United States
- Height: 5 ft 9 in (1.75 m)
- Positions: Defender; midfielder

College career
Years	Team	Apps	(Gls)
2005–2006	Tyler Apaches	32	
2007–2008	Grand Canyon Antelopes	33	

Senior career*
Years	Team	Apps	(Gls)
2007	Hampton Roads Piranhas	16	(6)
2007–2008	Arizona Sahuaros	35	(0)
2009	Thunder Bay Chill	13	(4)
2010	Vermont Voltage	21	(-)
2011	Arizona Sahuaros	12	(0)
2012–2013	Los Angeles Blues	33	(0)
2014	Fort Lauderdale Strikers	3	(0)
- * Club domestic league appearances and goals

Matheau "Matt" "Dupe" Hall (born July 27, 1987) is an American retired soccer player.

== Career ==
Hall played college soccer at Tyler Junior College between 2005 and 2006, before transferring to Grand Canyon University for the 2007 and 2008 seasons.

During his college career Hall had stints with several USL PDL and National Premier Soccer League teams in the United States and Canada. After recording seven assists for the Hampton Roads Piranhas in 2007, he left the PDL team before the end of the campaign to join the NPSL's Arizona Sahuaros, whose jersey he donned for the rest of that year and all of 2008.

In 2009, Hall moved on to Canada and the PDL's Thunder Bay Chill, for whom he registered five goals and four assists that season. The defender's performances would catch the eye of Mexican top-flight team Querétaro F.C., who brought him into training camp in 2010.

Hall subsequently had a standout season in PDL, producing 18 assists for the Vermont Voltage in 21 matches and drawing interest from the Rochester Rhinos and Sporting Kansas City, both of whom he joined for training stints. After accepting another camp invite, this one from the Mexican first division's Tijuana, he briefly re-joined the Sahuaros before leading indoor team Las Vegas Knights to the Premier Arena Soccer League final.

Hall signed his first professional contract with USL Professional Division club Los Angeles Blues on April 12, 2012. In the 2012 season, Hall appeared in 10 games where he recorded 5 assist Hall recorded 3 assist for Fort Lauderdale Strikers was released by Fort Lauderdale on July 3, 2014
