= Shay Spitz =

Association football player (born 1988)

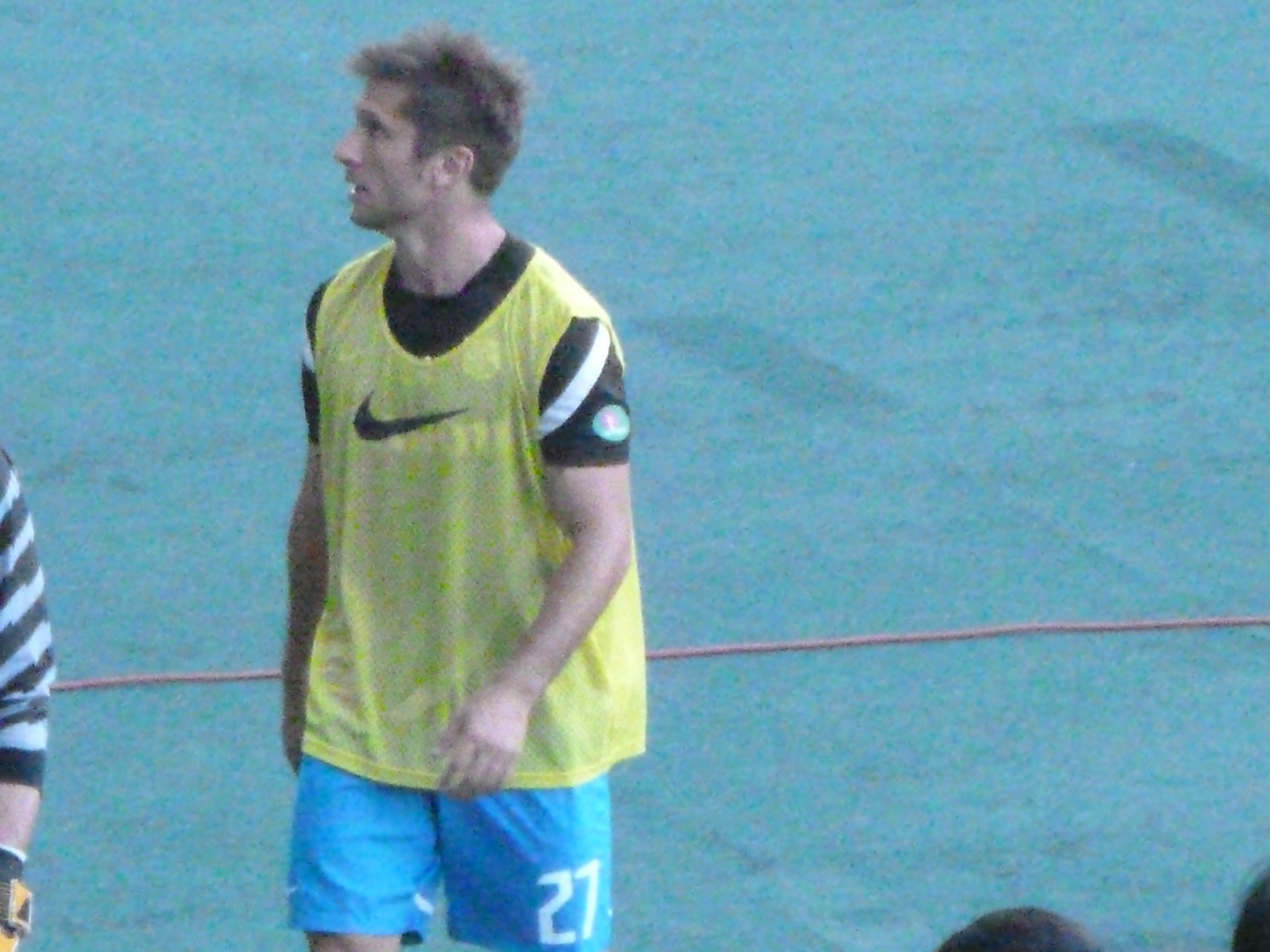
- Spitz in 2012

Personal information
- Date of birth: 27 January 1988 (age 38)
- Place of birth: Hong Kong
- Height: 1.70 m (5 ft 7 in)
- Position: Midfielder

College career
Years	Team	Apps	(Gls)
2006–2009	Cal State Fullerton Titans		

Senior career*
Years	Team	Apps	(Gls)
2010	Hollywood United	16	(4)
2011–2012	Rockdale City Suns	22	(4)
2012	Los Angeles Blues	10	(0)
2012–2013	Kitchee	6	(0)
2013	Los Angeles Blues	18	(4)
2014	Richmond Kickers	26	(4)
2014–2015	Hong Kong Rangers	8	(0)
2015–2020	Southern	80	(3)

International career
2012	United States (beach soccer)		

Managerial career
- 2018–2020: Southern (fitness coach)
- * Club domestic league appearances and goals

Shay Spitz (Chinese: 史必; born 27 January 1988) is a former professional footballer who played as a midfielder. Born in Hong Kong, he represented the United States at international level in beach soccer.

Spitz holds United States citizenship as well, but grew up in Singapore, Portugal and Australia. Despite holding New Zealand and American citizenship, Spitz did not spend time growing up in either country.

== Club career ==
=== College and amateur ===
Spitz took classes at Orange Coast College in Orange County, California for one semester, but did not play intercollegiate soccer. In 2006, Spitz transferred to California State University, Fullerton and played college soccer for four years, making 77 appearances and scoring 12 goals.

Spitz also spent the 2010 season with Hollywood United Hitmen in the USL Premier Development League.

=== Professional ===
On 15 February 2012, Spitz signed a professional contract with USL Pro club Los Angeles Blues and made his debut on 4 May in a 2–1 win over the Wilmington Hammerheads.

==== Kitchee ====
On 12 September 2012, Spitz signed a professional contract with Hong Kong First Division club Kitchee. He was forced to leave the club after reports that he did not have a work permit which was required even though he was born in Hong Kong.

==== Los Angeles Blues ====
In March 2013, Spitz rejoined Los Angeles Blues. He scored his first goal for the club on 26 April 2013 in a 4–0 victory over the Wilmington Hammerheads.

==== Southern District ====
On 9 July 2015, Spitz joined Southern after a season with Hong Kong Rangers.

On 2 July 2017, Southern announced on Facebook that Spitz would return for the upcoming season.

On 29 June 2020, it was announced that Spitz would leave the club and return to Australia to develop his career.

== International career ==
Spitz was included in the 12-player roster of United States national beach soccer team for Copa Salvador del Mundo 2013.

== Family ==
Shay Spitz's younger brother Tyler Spitz plays for the Hong Kong national rugby union team.
