= Nicolás Czornomaz =

Argentine footballer (born 1995)

Nico Czornomaz
Personal information
- Full name: Nicolás Czornomaz
- Date of birth: 8 July 1995 (age 31)
- Place of birth: Buenos Aires, Argentina
- Height: 1.78 m (5 ft 10 in)
- Position: Midfielder

Team information
- Current team: PAS Pyrgos
- Number: 29

Youth career
- Defensa y Justicia

Senior career*
Years	Team	Apps	(Gls)
2016–2018	Defensa y Justicia	0	(0)
2018	Los Angeles	0	(0)
2018	→ Orange County (loan)	5	(0)
2019	Mitre	0	(0)
2019–2020	Defensores Belgrano VR	12	(1)
2021–2022	Orense	22	(0)
2022	Virtus Matino	2	(0)
2022	Fano	0	(0)
2022–2023	Ierapetra	22	(2)
2023–2024	Chania	19	(0)
2024–2025	Panionios	19	(0)
2025–2026	Kalamata	16	(1)
2026–	PAS Pyrgos	4	(0)
- * Club domestic league appearances and goals as of 27 September 2026

Nicolás Czornomaz (born 8 July 1995) is an Argentine professional footballer who plays as a midfielder for Greek Super League 2 club PAS Pyrgos.

== Career ==
After spending time in his native Argentina with Defensa y Justicia, Czornomaz joined Major League Soccer side Los Angeles in April 2018. He was immediately loaned to their United Soccer League affiliate Orange County for the remainder of their season.

== Personal life ==
Nicolás is the son of former professional footballer Adrián Czornomaz, who played for numerous clubs, including Independiente, Banfield, Defensa y Justicia, SK Rapid Wien, Universitario and Tigres de la UANL.
