= Jerry van Wolfgang =

Dutch footballer (born 1992)

Personal information
- Date of birth: 12 March 1992 (age 34)
- Place of birth: Arnhem, Netherlands
- Height: 1.75 m (5 ft 9 in)
- Position: Winger

Youth career
- Vitesse 1892
- 2001–2008: PSV
- 2008–2011: Vitesse/AGOVV

Senior career*
Years	Team	Apps	(Gls)
2011–2012	AGOVV	20	(1)
2012–2015	De Graafschap	72	(24)
2015–2016	Go Ahead Eagles	26	(6)
2017	Orange County	29	(8)
2018	Reno 1868	27	(6)
2019	Orange County	33	(3)
2020–2021	Cheonan City	20	(5)
2022	FC Namdong	22	(8)
2022	Goyang KH	5	(0)
2023–2024	ADO Den Haag	14	(1)

International career
2009	Netherlands U17	10	(0)
2010–2011	Netherlands U19	3	(0)
- * Club domestic league appearances and goals as of 3 May 2024

Jerry van Wolfgang (previously known as Jerry van Ewijk) (born 12 March 1992) is a Dutch footballer who plays as a winger.

== Club career ==
Jerry van Wolfgang made his professional debut for AGOVV Apeldoorn and joined De Graafschap on non-professional terms in 2012. He scored 18 goals for the Superboeren in the 2014–15 season and moved to relegated Go Ahead Eagles at the end of that season. With both De Graafschap and Go Ahead he won promotion to the Eredivisie.

Van Wolfgang moved abroad to play for United Soccer League side Orange County in January 2017.

After playing the 2018 season with Reno 1868 FC, van Wolfgang rejoined Orange County on 11 February 2019.

Before the 2020 season, he joined K3 League side Cheonan City FC.

On 24 August 2023, van Wolfgang signed a one-year contract with ADO Den Haag. On 3 April 2024, the club announced that his contract had not been renewed ahead of the 2024–25 season.

== International career ==
Van Wolfgang played 10 matches for the Netherlands U-17 team including 3 at the 2009 UEFA European Under-17 Championship. He also played 3 games for the Netherlands U-19s.

== Career statistics ==
As of match played 3 May 2024

Appearances and goals by club, season and competition
Club	Season	League			National cup		Continental		Other		Total	
Club	Season	Division	Apps	Goals	Apps	Goals	Apps	Goals	Apps	Goals	Apps	Goals
AGOVV	2011–12	Eerste Divisie	20	1	—		—		—		20	1
De Graafschap	2012–13	Eerste Divisie	9	1	—		—		1 (Note: Appearance in Promotion Playoffs)	0	10	1
De Graafschap	2013–14	Eerste Divisie	27	5	1	0	—		1	0	29	5
De Graafschap	2014–15	Eerste Divisie	36	18	3	0	—		6	1	45	19
De Graafschap	Total		92	25	4	0	—		8	1	104	26
Go Ahead Eagles	2015–16	Eerste Divisie	26	6	2	0	2 (Note: Appearances in UEFA Europa League)	0	1	0	31	6
Orange County	2017	USL Championship	29	8	2	0	—		—		31	8
Orange County	2019	USL Championship	33	3	1	0	—		1 (Note: Appearance in 2019 USL Championship Playoffs)	0	35	3
Orange County	Total		62	11	3	0	—		1	0	66	11
Reno	2018	USL Championship	27	6	2	0	—		2 (Note: Appearances in U.S. Open Cup)	3	31	9
Cheonan City	2020	K3 League	14	5	1	2	—		—		15	7
Cheonan City	2021	K3 League	6	0	2	0	—		—		8	0
Cheonan City	Total		20	5	3	2	—		—		23	7
Namdong	2022	K4 League	22	8	2	0	—		—		24	8
Goyang KH	2023	K4 League	5	0	—		—		—		5	0
ADO Den Haag	2023–24	Eerste Divisie	14	0	1	0	—		—		15	0
Career total			268	61	17	2	2	0	12	4	299	67
