= Sola Abolaji =

American soccer player (born 1985)

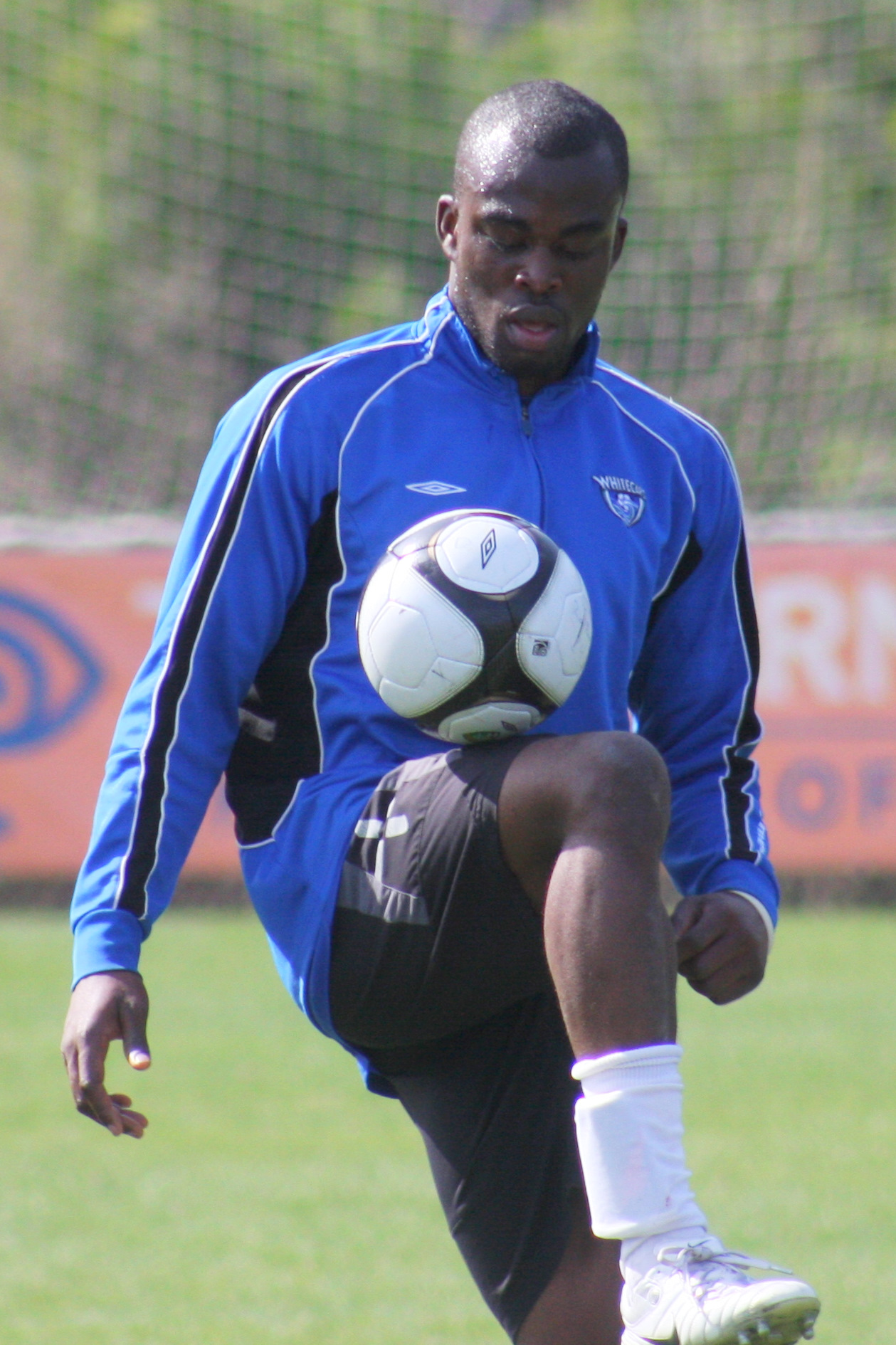

Personal information
- Full name: Oluwanisola Abolaji
- Date of birth: March 27, 1985 (age 41)
- Place of birth: Carbondale, Illinois, United States
- Height: 6 ft 0 in (1.83 m)
- Positions: Defender; midfielder

College career
Years	Team	Apps	(Gls)
2003	Barton Cougars		
2004	Northern Oklahoma Mavericks		
2005–2006	Buffalo Bulls		

Senior career*
Years	Team	Apps	(Gls)
2005–2006	Boulder Rapids Reserve	30	(0)
2007	Carolina RailHawks	17	(0)
2007	Vancouver Whitecaps	10	(0)
2008	Colorado Rapids U23's	18	(0)
2009	Thunder Bay Chill	12	(0)
2010	Enköpings SK		
2011	Ullensaker/Kisa IL		
2013	IFK Lammhult		
2014	Myresjö/Vetlanda FK		
2015	Ventura County Fusion	3	(0)
2017	Orange County SC	5	(1)
- * Club domestic league appearances and goals as of 15:31, 20 October 2017 (UTC)

Oluwanisola "Sola" Abolaji (born March 27, 1985) is an American former soccer player.

== Career ==
=== College and amateur ===
Abolaji attended Eaglecrest High School in Aurora, Colorado and played college soccer at Barton County Community College in Kansas, where he was named to the NJCAA Region VI All-Region second team in 2003. He transferred to Northern Oklahoma College in 2004, where he was named the team's defensive MVP and helped lead the Mavericks to the NJCAA Region II championship. He then transferred again, to the University at Buffalo, where he spent his junior and senior years. He played 18 games for the Bulls his senior year, scoring two goals and one assist, the helper coming on the game-winning goal in the Bulls' upset win over 19th-ranked Northern Illinois.

While in college, Abolaji also played for Colorado Rapids U23's in the USL Premier Development League.

=== Professional ===
Abolaji was the first overall selection in the 2007 USL-1 Draft by the Carolina RailHawks, making him the first athlete from the University of Buffalo to be drafted first overall in any professional sports draft. Having played just 10 games for the RailHawks, Abolaji was traded to the Vancouver Whitecaps in exchange for Joel John Bailey on July 29, 2007, but later left the team after a coaching change.

After a few years playing in the lower tiers of the American soccer pyramid, he transitioned to Scandinavia where he played with several teams. In 2015, he returned to the United States and was a long-term trialist with the Chicago Fire and the Sacramento Republic, featuring in games against the San Jose Earthquakes. He joined the Ventura County Fusion, where he featured prominently in their 2nd Round U.S. Open Cup win over the L.A. Galaxy. In January 2016 he returned to Scandinavia.

== Personal ==
His parents are of Nigerian origin. His name "Oluwanisola" means "God creates Wealth" in Yoruba.
