= Wuilito Fernandes =

Cape Verdean footballer

Personal information
- Full name: Wuilito Paulo Tavares Fernandes
- Date of birth: 23 March 1990 (age 36)
- Place of birth: Praia, Cape Verde
- Height: 1.84 m (6 ft 0 in)
- Positions: Full back; attacking midfielder; forward

Youth career
- Bairro FC

College career
Years	Team	Apps	(Gls)
2013–2016	UMass Lowell River Hawks	65	(25)

Senior career*
Years	Team	Apps	(Gls)
2017	Orange County SC	25	(3)
2018	North Carolina FC	15	(1)

International career
2017–2018	Cape Verde	3	(0)
- * Club domestic league appearances and goals as of 12:22, 15 October 2018 (UTC)

Wuilito Paulo Tavares Fernandes (born 23 March 1990), also known as Totti, is a Cape Verdean football player who plays as a midfielder or forward.

== Career ==
In 2009, Fernandes moved to the United States, where his mother lived, having spent time with Bairro FC in his native Cape Verde. He had an unsuccessful trial with New York Red Bulls in 2010.

Fernandes played four years of college soccer at the University of Massachusetts Lowell between 2013 and 2016, scoring 25 goals in 65 appearances and tallying 10 assists.

On 17 January 2017, Fernandes was drafted in the third round (62nd overall) of the 2017 MLS SuperDraft by FC Dallas.

Fernandes signed with United Soccer League side Orange County SC in April 2017.

Fernandes signed with USL side North Carolina FC in January 2018.
