= Roy Meeus =

Belgian footballer

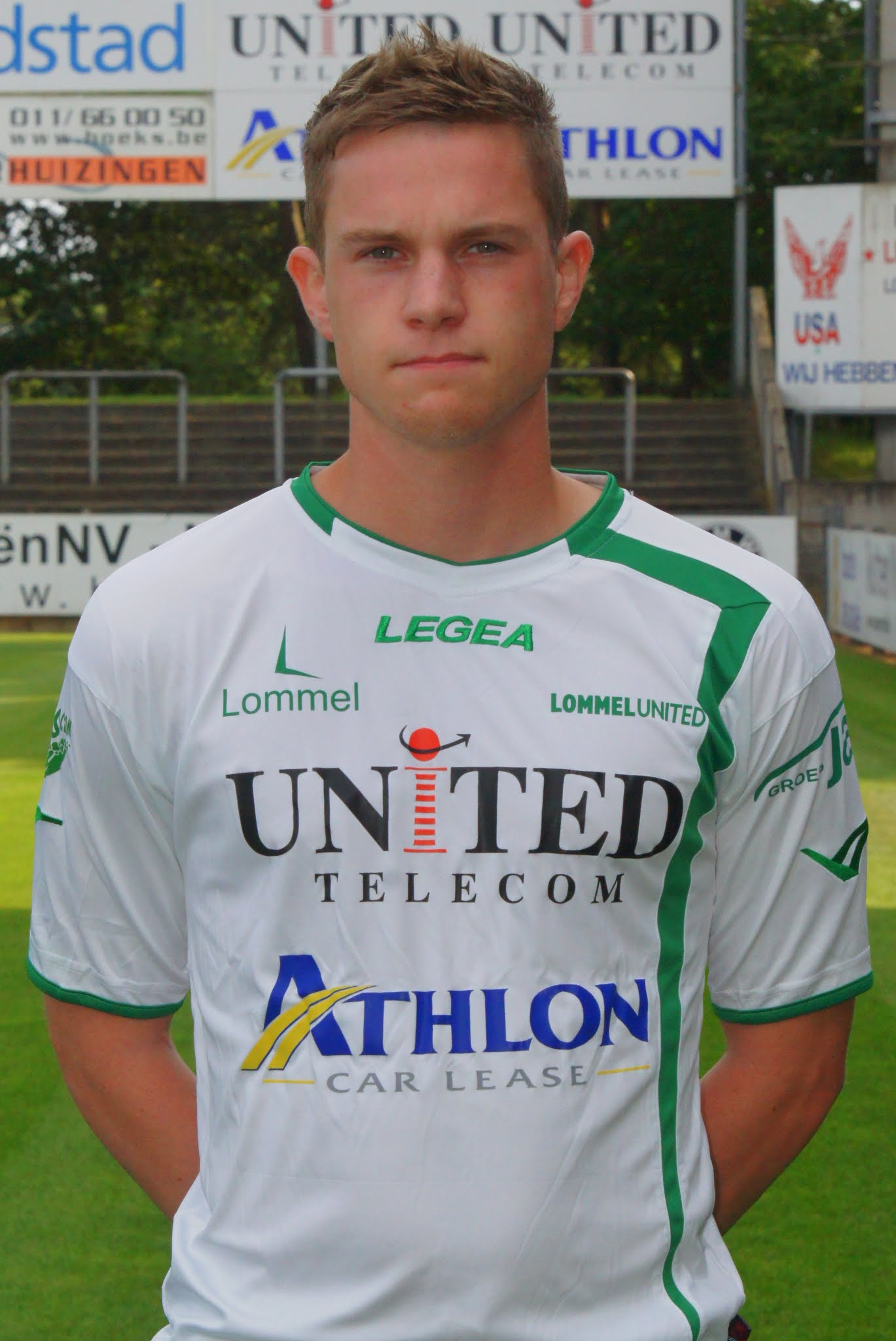
- Meeus during his time with Lommel United

Personal information
- Date of birth: 24 May 1989 (age 37)
- Place of birth: Lommel, Belgium
- Position: Defender

Senior career*
Years	Team	Apps	(Gls)
2006–2007	KVSK United	5	(0)
2007–2011	Club Brugge	2	(0)
2010–2011	→ Dender (loan)	34	(11)
2011–2013	Lommel United	61	(8)
2013–2015	Dessel Sport	63	(4)
2016–2017	Orange County SC	45	(8)
- * Club domestic league appearances and goals

Roy Meeus (born 24 May 1989) is a Belgian former professional footballer.

== Career ==
Born in Lommel, Belgium, Meeus has played for KVSK United, Club Brugge, Dender, and Lommel United.

== Personal life ==
Meeus married Ashlee Bond, an American-Israeli Olympic show jumping rider who competes for Israel, in 2015 and they have a daughter named Scottie, born in 2016.
