= Michael Seaton (footballer) =

Jamaican footballer (born 1996)

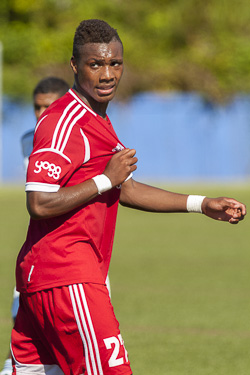
- Seaton in 2013

Personal information
- Full name: Michael Joseph Arantes Seaton
- Date of birth: 1 May 1996 (age 30)
- Place of birth: Spanish Town, Jamaica
- Height: 6 ft 0 in (1.83 m)
- Position: Forward

Youth career
- 2010–2012: D.C. United

Senior career*
Years	Team	Apps	(Gls)
2013–2015	D.C. United	5	(0)
2013–2014	→ Richmond Kickers (loan)	23	(8)
2015	→ Örebro SK (loan)	4	(0)
2015–2016	Portland Timbers	0	(0)
2015	→ Portland Timbers 2 (loan)	5	(1)
2016–2017	Hapoel Ramat Gan	17	(6)
2017	→ Hapoel Tel Aviv (loan)	1	(0)
2017–2018	Maccabi Ahi Nazareth	15	(0)
2018–2019	Orange County SC	56	(24)
2020–2021	Viktoria Köln	22	(2)
2021–2022	BSV Rehden	14	(7)
2022–2023	Berliner AK 07	20	(4)
2023–2024	Rot-Weiß Erfurt	28	(13)
2024–2025	SV Rödinghausen	22	(9)
2025	Obermais	12	(3)
2026	Phönix Lübeck	3	(0)

International career^{‡}
2012–2013	Jamaica U17	5	(2)
2015	Jamaica U20	3	(2)
2015	Jamaica U23	4	(4)
2013–	Jamaica	14	(2)
Medal record
Men's football
Representing Jamaica
CONCACAF Gold Cup
Runner-up	2015 United States–Canada	Team
- * Club domestic league appearances and goals as of 20 June 2026 ‡ National team caps and goals as of 13 October 2015

Michael Seaton (born 1 May 1996) is a Jamaican professional footballer. Upon his MLS debut with D.C. United in 2013, he became the league's first player born after it began play.

== Youth ==
Born in Spanish Town, Jamaica, Seaton began playing for D.C. United in 2010, when he signed for their youth academy, as part of the U-15 squad. Before playing for D.C. United, he played for the Freestate Soccer Alliance, a soccer club based in Bowie, Maryland. He worked his way up the ranks of the academy.

== Professional career ==
=== United States ===
In 2009–10, Seaton started his soccer career by playing with his middle school team, Nicholas Orem Middle School. With the help of his coach, Mr. Winston Miller, Seaton tried out for the D.C. United Youth Academy. Seaton signed with D.C. United on 13 January 2013. Seaton was the fifth member of United's Academy to sign a contract with the first team.

In March 2013, he was loaned to the Richmond Kickers of USL Pro. On 3 May, Seaton made his debut for Richmond against Wilmington, where he scored.

Seaton's first game with D.C. United was a friendly match on 12 July 2013, against C.D. Guadalajara. Seaton played for 20 minutes and assisted Carlos Ruiz's goal in the 73rd minute. He made his first MLS start on 28 September 2013, against Toronto FC. Seaton trained with Serie A club Internazionale during January 2014. He played five MLS games in total for DC United.

On 6 August 2015, Seaton was traded to Portland Timbers. He was waived by the club on 13 May 2016.

=== Sweden ===
==== Örebro SK ====
On 31 March 2015, Örebro SK presented Seaton as their player, joining the Swedish team on a loan deal. On 4 June, Örebro SK announced that they cancelled the loan deal with Seaton and that he would return to D.C. United.

=== Israel ===
In July 2016, Seaton signed with Israel second division club Hapoel Ramat Gan. On 26 January 2017, Seaton was loaned to Hapoel Tel Aviv, and returned on 30 June 2017.

On 3 September 2017, Seaton joined Maccabi Ahi Nazareth.

=== Orange County SC ===
In March 2018, Seaton signed with Orange County SC in the USL. In 29 appearances for the club, he scored 15 goals and tallied seven assists, including a playoff hat trick against Saint Louis FC on 20 October. Just four days later, Seaton agreed to terms with Orange County SC to remain with the club for the 2019 season.

Seaton scored Orange County's first goal of 2019 after intercepting an errant back pass as his side fought back from a 2–0 deficit to draw 2–2 on 9 March. On 4 May, just four days after his 23rd birthday, the striker scored the winning goal against rival side Phoenix Rising FC. On 24 July, Seaton surpassed former teammate Thomas Enevoldsen to become Orange County SC's all-time leading goalscorer. Seaton finished 2019 with 13 goals and five assists in 31 appearances. In November 2019, Seaton announced his departure from Orange County SC.

=== Germany ===
==== Viktoria Köln ====
In January 2020, Seaton joined FC Viktoria Köln in a free transfer.

==== SV Rödinghausen ====
As of the 2024–2025 season, Seaton plays in the German fourth division in Rodinghausen

=== Italy ===
On August 10, 2025, Seaton signed with Italian Serie D side FC Obermais.

== International career ==
Seaton received his first senior Jamaica national team call versus Trinidad on 15 November 2013. Seaton scored his 1st senior international goal versus St. Lucia on 5 March 2014, as a 17-year-old.

=== International goals ===
Scores and results list Jamaica's goal tally first, score column indicates score after each Seaton goal.

List of international goals scored by Michael Seaton
No.	Date	Venue	Opponent	Score	Result	Competition
1	5 March 2014	Beausejour Stadium, Gros Islet, Saint Lucia	Saint Lucia	1–0	5–0	Friendly
2	26 May 2014	Red Bull Arena, Harrison, New Jersey, United States	Serbia	1–2	1–2	Friendly

== Personal life ==
Seaton also holds U.S. citizenship.

== Honours ==
Portland Timbers

- MLS Cup: 2015
- Western Conference (playoffs): 2015

Orange County SC

- USL Western Conference Regular Season Champion: 2018

Jamaica

- Caribbean Cup: 2014
