= Dusan Stevanovic (footballer, born 1992) =

Serbian-American soccer player

Dusan Stevanović
Personal information
- Date of birth: April 21, 1992 (age 34)
- Place of birth: Belgrade, FR Yugoslavia
- Height: 6 ft 1 in (1.85 m)
- Position: Midfielder

Youth career
- West Coast Futbol Club

Senior career*
Years	Team	Apps	(Gls)
2011–2015	Sinđelić Beograd	23	(0)
2011–2012	→ Sopot (loan)		
2015	→ BASK (loan)		
2016–2017	Orange County	29	(3)
2018	California United FC II	5	(1)
- * Club domestic league appearances and goals as of 15:31, 20 October 2017 (UTC)

Dusan Stevanović (Serbian Cyrillic: Душан Стевановић, born 21 April 1992) is a Serbian-American retired football player.

== Career ==
Stevanović was born in Serbia, but grew up in the United States. He began his career with FK Sinđelić Beograd, spending time on loan with both FK Sopot and FK BASK. Stevanović made the move back to the United States, signing with third-tier side Orange County Blues in and has now joined California United FC II in 2018.
