= 2018 North Carolina FC season =

North Carolina
2018 season
- Owner: Stephen Malik
- Head coach: Colin Clarke
- Stadium: Sahlen's Stadium at WakeMed Soccer Park; Cary, North Carolina (Capacity: 10,000)
- USL: 9th
- Southern Derby: Champions
- U.S. Open Cup: 4th Round
- Top goalscorer: League: Daniel Ríos (20); All: Daniel Ríos (20)
- Highest home attendance: 9,505 (September 8 vs. Nashville)
- Lowest home attendance: 3,169 (Apr 7 vs. Indy)
- Average home league attendance: 4,730
- Biggest win: 6–1 (September 21 vs. Atlanta United 2)
- Biggest defeat: 1–4 (May 19 vs. Cincinnati)
Home colors	Away colors

The 2018 North Carolina FC season was the club's 12th season of existence. Until the 2017 season, the club was previously known as the Carolina RailHawks. The 2018 season was the clubs first in the USL, having left the NASL at the end of the 2017 season. For the first time since 2009 and its fourth in club history, North Carolina won the Southern Derby, a fan-based U.S. professional soccer cup competition between North Carolina, Charleston Battery, and Charlotte Independence. North Carolina finished the regular season in 9th place with 47 points, missing out on the playoffs by 2 points to Nashville.

== Club ==
=== Coaching staff ===
As of March 15, 2018

Position	Staff
Head coach	(Northern Ireland) Colin Clarke
Assistant coach	(United States) Dewan Bader
Assistant coach	(Scotland) Greg Shields
Assistant coach	(United States) Nic Platter
Assistant coach	(United States) Michael Milazzo
Head Athletic Trainer	(United States) Shawn Wilson

=== Roster ===
As of October 13, 2018

No.	Position	Nation	Player
1	GK	GRE	Alex Tabakis
3	DF	USA	Peabo Doue
4	MF	NGR	Victor Igbekoyi
5	DF	USA	Michael Harrington
6	MF	USA	Austin da Luz
7	FW	CMR	Donovan Ewolo
8	MF	TTO	Dre Fortune
9	FW	NED	Marios Lomis
10	MF	CAN	Kyle Bekker
11	DF	CPV	Wuilito Fernandes
13	DF	USA	Connor Tobin
14	FW	MEX	Daniel Ríos (on loan from Guadalajara)
15	MF	USA	Cameron Steele
16	MF	USA	Graham Smith
17	MF	AUT	Bernhard Luxbacher
18	MF	GER	Marcel Kandziora
22	MF	RSA	Ty Shipalane
23	MF	USA	Zach Steinberger (on loan from Indy Eleven)
27	DF	USA	D.J. Taylor
30	GK	USA	Austin Guerrero
31	DF	USA	Steven Miller
33	DF	MEX	Aaron Guillen
99	MF	ESA	Nelson Blanco

== Transfers ==
=== Winter ===
In: Note: Flags indicate national team as defined under FIFA eligibility rules; some limited exceptions apply. Players may hold more than one non-FIFA nationality.

No.	Pos.	Nation	Player
1	GK	GRE	Alexandros Tabakis (from (United States) Sporting Kansas City)
3	DF	USA	Peabo Doue (from (United States) Jacksonville Armada)
4	DF	CMR	Carson Nsegbe (from (Cameroon) Rainbow FC)
5	DF	USA	Michael Harrington (from (United States) Chicago Fire)
7	FW	CMR	Donovan Ewolo (from (Czech Republic) MFK Vyškov)
9	FW	NED	Marios Lomis (from (United States) Creighton University)
10	MF	CAN	Kyle Bekker (from (United States) San Francisco Deltas)
10	FW	CPV	Wuilito Fernandes (from (United States) Orange County SC)
14	FW	MEX	Daniel Ríos (on loan from (Mexico) Guadalajara)
15	MF	USA	Cameron Steele (from (United States) Penn State University)
16	MF	USA	Graham Smith (from (United States) University of South Florida)
17	MF	AUT	Bernhard Luxbacher (from (Austria) Wiener SK)
30	GK	USA	Austin Guerrero (from (Panama) Alianza)
98	DF	GAM	Futty Danso (from (Malaysia) Kelantan)

Out: Note: Flags indicate national team as defined under FIFA eligibility rules; some limited exceptions apply. Players may hold more than one non-FIFA nationality.

No.	Pos.	Nation	Player
1	GK	USA	Macklin Robinson (to (United States) New York Cosmos B)
2	DF	ENG	Paul Black
4	DF	HAI	James Marcelin
7	MF	JAM	Lance Laing (to (United States) FC Cincinnati)
8	MF	JAM	Saeed Robinson (to (United States) Colorado Springs Switchbacks)
9	FW	USA	Matthew Fondy
10	MF	USA	Nazmi Albadawi (to (United States) FC Cincinnati)
12	MF	TTO	Kareem Moses (to (Finland) FF Jaro)
15	DF	USA	Christian Ibeagha (to (United States) Oklahoma City Energy)
17	FW	USA	Billy Schuler
19	FW	TTO	Jonathan Glenn
20	MF	USA	Jonathon Orlando
26	FW	BRA	Renan Gorne (return to (Brazil) Botafogo)
30	MF	NGR	Bolu Akinyode (to (United States) Nashville SC)
37	MF	WAL	Danny Barrow
92	GK	USA	Brian Sylvestre (to (United States) LA Galaxy)

=== Summer ===
In: Note: Flags indicate national team as defined under FIFA eligibility rules; some limited exceptions apply. Players may hold more than one non-FIFA nationality.

No.	Pos.	Nation	Player
23	MF	USA	Zach Steinberger (on loan from (United States) Indy Eleven)
4	MF	NGR	Victor Igbekoyi (from (Azerbaijan) Zira FK)

Out: Note: Flags indicate national team as defined under FIFA eligibility rules; some limited exceptions apply. Players may hold more than one non-FIFA nationality.

No.	Pos.	Nation	Player
98	DF	GAM	Futty Danso (to (Malaysia) UiTM FC)

== Competitions ==
Win Draw Loss

=== Friendlies ===
February 14	Atlanta United FC	–	North Carolina FC	Marietta, Georgia
				Stadium: Atlanta United FC Training Ground; Attendance: Closed-door
Note: Match result not publicized.

February 18	North Carolina FC	–	UNC Wilmington	Cary, North Carolina
		Report		Stadium: WakeMed Soccer Park
Note: Cancelled due to inclement weather.

February 25	Charlotte Independence	0–1	North Carolina FC	Matthews, North Carolina
13:00 EST			Miller	Stadium: Sportsplex at Matthews

March 3	NC State University	0–2	North Carolina FC	Raleigh, North Carolina
10:00 EST			Miller; Doue	Stadium: Dail Soccer Stadium

March 10	Charleston Battery	0–1 (a.e.t.)	North Carolina FC	Charleston, South Carolina
11:00 EST		Report	Ríos	Stadium: MUSC Health Stadium
Note: 45 minutes of extra time played.

=== USL ===
==== Standings ====
Pos	Team	Pld	W	D	L	GF	GA	GD	Pts	Qualification
7	Indy Eleven	34	13	10	11	45	42	+3	49	Conference Playoffs
8	Nashville SC	34	12	13	9	42	31	+11	49	Conference Playoffs
9	North Carolina FC	34	13	8	13	60	50	+10	47	
10	Ottawa Fury	34	13	6	15	31	43	−12	45	
11	Charlotte Independence	34	10	12	12	44	57	−13	42	

Source: 2018 USL standings
Rules for classification: 1) total wins; 2) total goal differential; 3) total goals scored; 4) points earned against top four Conference finishers; 5) disciplinary points; 6) coin toss or drawing of lots

==== Results by round ====
Round	1	2	3	4	5	6	7	8	9	10	11	12	13	14	15	16	17	18	19	20	21	22	23	24	25	26	27	28	29	30	31	32	33	34
Stadium	H	A	H	A	A	A	H	A	H	H	H	H	A	H	A	A	H	A	H	H	H	A	A	A	H	H	H	A	A	A	H	H	A	A
Result	L	L	L	W	D	D	W	L	W	L	L	W	L	D	W	L	D	D	W	W	D	W	L	D	W	L	D	W	W	L	W	L	L	W
Position	13	14	14	13	11	11	9	15	12	12	14	13	13	12	12	13	13	13	13	10	11	10	10	10	10	10	10	10	8	10	8	10	10	9

Updated to match(es) played on October 6, 2018. Source: Match reports
A = Away; H = Home; W = Win; D = Draw; L = Loss

==== Matches ====
March 17 1	North Carolina FC	1–3	Tampa Bay Rowdies	Cary, North Carolina
15:30 EDT	Danso (yellow card) 17'; Miller 38'	Report	Fernandes 23'; Hristov 41' (pen.); Blake 90'	Stadium: Sahlen's Stadium at WakeMed Soccer Park; Attendance: 4,197; Referee: Guido Gonzalez

March 31 2	Richmond Kickers	2–1	North Carolina FC	Richmond, Virginia
17:00 EDT	Umar (yellow card) 41'; Imura 76' (pen.); Gonzalez 83'	Report	Ríos 43'; Guillen (yellow card) 76'	Stadium: City Stadium; Attendance: 5,032; Referee: Sergii Demianchuk

April 7 3	North Carolina FC	0–1	Indy Eleven	Cary, North Carolina
19:00 EDT	Kandziora (yellow card) 36'; Smith (yellow card) 54'; Bekker (yellow card) 78'; Guillen (red card) 90+5'	Report	Pasher 15'; Mitchell (yellow card) 37'; Williams (yellow card) 71'; Ouimette (red card) 90+5'	Stadium: Sahlen's Stadium at WakeMed Soccer Park; Attendance: 3,169; Referee: Kevin Broadley

April 14 4	Charlotte Independence	0–2	North Carolina FC	Matthews, North Carolina
19:00 EDT	Martínez (yellow card) 7'; Smith (yellow card) 85'	Report	Ríos 50'; Doue (yellow card) 59'; Fortune (yellow card) 61'; Lomis 86'	Stadium: Sportsplex at Matthews; Attendance: 2,264; Referee: Matthew Franz

April 18 5	Toronto FC II	0–0	North Carolina FC	Toronto, Ontario
20:00 EDT	Bjornethun (yellow card) 5'	Report	Kandziora (yellow card) 78'	Stadium: BMO Field; Attendance: 50; Referee: Yusri Rudolph

April 21 6	Ottawa Fury	1–1	North Carolina FC	Ottawa, Ontario
14:00 EDT	Bruna (yellow card) 70'; Tabakis 86' (o.g.)	Report	Ríos 35'	Stadium: TD Place Stadium; Attendance: 6,137; Referee: Pierre Lauziere

April 28 7	North Carolina FC	3–0	Penn FC	Cary, North Carolina
19:00 EDT	da Luz 29'; Bekker 35'; Ríos 37'; Kandziora (yellow card) 66'; Miller (yellow card) 75'	Report	Eustáquio (yellow card) 40'; Bond (yellow card) 49'	Stadium: Sahlen's Stadium at WakeMed Soccer Park; Attendance: 3,970; Referee: Jonathan Bilinski

May 19 8	FC Cincinnati	4–1	North Carolina FC	Cincinnati, Ohio
19:30 EDT	Albadawi 11', 45'; Smith (yellow card) 30'; Ledesma 62' (pen.); König 69' (yellow card) 75'	Report	Bekker (yellow card) 65'; Lomis 86'	Stadium: Nippert Stadium; Attendance: 22,884; Referee: Victor Rivas

May 25 9	North Carolina FC	4–0	Atlanta United 2	Cary, North Carolina
19:00 EDT	Ewolo 7'; Crain 26' (o.g.); Bekker (yellow card) 45+1'; Ríos 52'; Lomis 89'	Report	Wheeler-Omiunu (yellow card) 72'; Kendall-Moullin (yellow card) 73'	Stadium: Sahlen's Stadium at WakeMed Soccer Park; Attendance: 3,710; Referee: Lorant Varga

June 2 10	North Carolina FC	1–2	Bethlehem Steel FC	Cary, North Carolina
19:00 EDT	Doue 16'; Tobin (yellow card) 57'; Harrington (yellow card) 67' da Luz (yellow card) 89'	Report	Najen (yellow card) 25'; Ofeimu 83'; Ngalina 85'	Stadium: Sahlen's Stadium at WakeMed Soccer Park; Attendance: 3,526; Referee: Elvis Osmanovic

June 9 11	North Carolina FC	0–2	FC Cincinnati	Cary, North Carolina
19:00 EDT		Report	Ledesma (yellow card) 26'; König 37' (yellow card) 52'; Hoyte (yellow card) 72'; McLaughlin 87'	Stadium: Sahlen's Stadium at WakeMed Soccer Park; Attendance: 4,039; Referee: Mark Allatin

June 13 12	North Carolina FC	4–2	Ottawa Fury FC	Cary, North Carolina
19:00 EDT	Tobin 3' (yellow card) 76'; Ríos 30'; Lomis 43'; Miller 57'; Smith (yellow card) 69'; Bekker (yellow card) 87'	Report	Oliveira 45+2'; Attakora (yellow card) 53'; D.J. Taylor 74' (o.g.); Obasi (yellow card) 79'	Stadium: Sahlen's Stadium at WakeMed Soccer Park; Attendance: 3,452; Referee: Guido Gonzalez

June 16 13	Nashville SC	1–0	North Carolina FC	Nashville, Tennessee
19:30 CDT	Allen (yellow card) 16'; Mensah 90+4'	Report	da Luz (yellow card) 37'; Miller (yellow card) 90+4'	Stadium: First Tennessee Park; Attendance: 9,047; Referee: Lukasz Szpala

June 23 14	North Carolina FC	2–2	Louisville City FC	Cary, North Carolina
19:00 EDT	Ríos 30' 87' (yellow card) 46'; Kandziora (yellow card) 90+2'	Report	Craig 39'; Ilić 59'; McCabe (yellow card) 72'	Stadium: Sahlen's Stadium at WakeMed Soccer Park; Attendance: 3,554; Referee: Rosendo Mendoza

June 30 15	Richmond Kickers	1–3	North Carolina FC	Richmond, Virginia
19:00 EDT	Cordovés 4'; Worra (yellow card) 90+5'	Report	Lee 59' (o.g.) da Luz 62'; Ewolo 90+5' (pen.)	Stadium: City Stadium; Attendance: 5,137; Referee: Eric Tattersall

July 4 16	Pittsburgh Riverhounds	2–0	North Carolina FC	Pittsburgh, Pennsylvania
19:00 EDT	Fortune (yellow card) 75'; Blanco (yellow card) 89'	Report	François 71'; Kerr 71'; Lubahn (yellow card) 84'	Stadium: Highmark Stadium; Referee: Jon Freemon

July 7 17	North Carolina FC	1–1	Charleston Battery	Cary, North Carolina
19:00 EDT	Ríos 81'; Guillen (yellow card) 90+5'	Report	Guerra 63'; Woodbine (yellow card) 69'	Stadium: Sahlen's Stadium at WakeMed Soccer Park; Attendance: 3,623; Referee: Javier Santos

July 14 18	Bethlehem Steel FC	1–1	North Carolina FC	Bethlehem, Pennsylvania
17:00 EDT	Kandziora 22' (yellow card) 90+4'; Smith (yellow card) 40'; Fortune (yellow card) 70'	Report	Najem 56'; Chiluya (yellow card) 65'; Holness (yellow card) 83'; Aubrey (yellow card) 90+5'	Stadium: Goodman Stadium; Attendance: 2,749; Referee: Jonathan Bilinski

July 21 19	North Carolina FC	3–1	Toronto FC II	Cary, North Carolina
19:00 EDT	da Luz 28'; Harrington (yellow card) 54'; Ríos 55' (pen.); Bekker 61' (yellow card) 74'; Guillen (yellow card) 70'	Report	Hundal 20'; Romeo (yellow card) 54'; Campbell (yellow card) 60'	Stadium: Sahlen's Stadium at WakeMed Soccer Park; Attendance: 4,626; Referee: Gustavo Solorio

July 28 20	North Carolina FC	2–1	Pittsburgh Riverhounds	Cary, North Carolina
19:00 EDT	Ríos 24'; Guillen (yellow card) 42'; Fernandes 90+1'	Report	François 57'	Stadium: Sahlen's Stadium at WakeMed Soccer Park; Attendance: 3,896; Referee: Lorant Varga

August 4 21 Southern Derby	North Carolina FC	0–0	Charleston Battery	Cary, North Carolina
19:00 EDT		Report	Guerra (yellow card) 43'	Stadium: Sahlen's Stadium at WakeMed Soccer Park; Attendance: 4,026; Referee: Bardhyl Pashaj

August 11 22	Tampa Bay Rowdies	0–2	North Carolina FC	St. Petersburg, Florida
19:30 EDT	Diakité (yellow card) 13'	Report	Tobin (yellow card) 6' da Luz (yellow card) 51'; Kandziora 65' (Miller); Ríos 78' (Bekker)	Stadium: Al Lang Stadium; Attendance: 4,876; Referee: Luis Guardia

August 15 23	Indy Eleven	3–2	North Carolina FC	Indianapolis, Indiana
19:00 EDT	Starikov 7'; Speas 31'; Mitchell (yellow card) 45'; Guerra 90'	Report	Bekker 45+1'; Lomis 77'	Stadium: Lucas Oil Stadium; Attendance: 9,023; Referee: Rubiel Vazquez

August 21 24	New York Red Bulls II	2–2	North Carolina FC	Montclair, New Jersey
19:00 EDT	Aguinaga 39'; Stroud (yellow card) 47'; Stauffer 53' (yellow card) 88'; Mines (red card) 69'; Cásseres (yellow card) 81'	Report	da Luz (yellow card) 43'; Ríos 46'; Bekker (yellow card) 61'; Tobin (yellow card) 68'; Smith (yellow card) 76'; Ewolo 90'	Stadium: MSU Soccer Park at Pittser Field; Attendance: 781; Referee: Jose Lara

August 25 25 Southern Derby	North Carolina FC	6–2	Charlotte Independence	Cary, North Carolina
19:00 EDT	Steinberger 26', 51' (yellow card) 52'; Fernandes (yellow card) 36'; Miller (yellow card) 36' (goal) 49' da Luz 69'; Ríos 72', 78'	Report	George 24' (yellow card) 32'; Owundi (yellow card) 72'; Areman 85'	Stadium: Sahlen's Stadium at WakeMed Soccer Park; Attendance: 4,195; Referee: Daniel Gutierrez

September 1 26	North Carolina FC	0–3	Tampa Bay Rowdies	Cary, North Carolina
19:00 EDT	Guillen (yellow card) 61'; Lomis (yellow card) 76'; Tobin (yellow card) 81' da Luz (yellow card) 90+2'	Report	Guenzatti 23', 43', 56'; Oduro (yellow card) 48'	Stadium: Sahlen's Stadium at WakeMed Soccer Park; Attendance: 4,102; Referee: Matthew Franz

September 8 27	North Carolina FC	3–3	Nashville SC	Cary, North Carolina
17:00 EDT	Shipalane 18'; Ríos 39'; Steinberger 63'	Report	Allen 51' (pen.), 80' (pen.); Kimura (yellow card) 67'; Moloto 82'	Stadium: Sahlen's Stadium at WakeMed Soccer Park; Attendance: 9,505; Referee: Guido Gonzalez Jr.

September 16 28	Penn FC	0–1	North Carolina FC	Harrisburg, Pennsylvania
19:00 EDT	Shaibu (yellow card) 84'	Report	Ríos 11'; Ewolo (yellow card) 90+2'	Stadium: FNB Field; Attendance: 2,205; Referee: Elvis Osmanovic

September 21 29	Atlanta United 2	1–6	North Carolina FC	Lawrenceville, Georgia
19:00 EDT	Castro 8'	Report	Ewolo 3', 16', 33', 89'; Bekker 29'; Steinberger 42'; Smith (yellow card) 61'; Igbekoyi (yellow card) 71'	Stadium: Coolray Field; Attendance: 1,923; Referee: Sergii Demianchuk

September 26 30 Southern Derby	Charleston Battery	2–0	North Carolina FC	Charleston, South Carolina
19:00 EDT	Mansaray 90+1'; Svantesson 90+4'	Report		Stadium: MUSC Health Stadium; Attendance: 1,748; Referee: Marcos DeOliveira

September 29 31	North Carolina FC	3–2	Richmond Kickers	Cary, North Carolina
19:00 EDT	Bekker 39', 73' da Luz 61'; Ríos (yellow card) 90+1'	Report	Cordovés (yellow card) 11', (goal) 44', (yellow card) 79' (red card); Agyemang 30'; Boehme (yellow card) 45+1'; Eaton (yellow card) 50'	Stadium: Sahlen's Stadium at WakeMed Soccer Park; Attendance: 8,004; Referee: Kevin Broadley

October 6 32	North Carolina FC	1–2	New York Red Bulls II	Cary, North Carolina
19:00 EDT	Guillen (yellow card) 45+3'; Bekker 52'	Report	Abang 24', (red card) 45+6'; Barlow 79'	Stadium: Sahlen's Stadium at WakeMed Soccer Park; Attendance: 8,820; Referee: Ismir Pekmic

October 9 33	Louisville City FC	2–1	North Carolina FC	Louisville, Kentucky
19:00 EDT	Craig (yellow card) 25'; Lancaster 47', 84'; Jimenez (yellow card) 72'	Report	Ríos (yellow card) 29', (goal) 38'; Bekker (yellow card) 61'	Stadium: Louisville Slugger Field; Attendance: 6,693; Referee: Tim Ford
Note: Match originally scheduled to be played on March 24 but was postponed due to poor pitch conditions

October 13 34 Southern Derby	Charlotte Independence	1–3	North Carolina FC	Matthews, North Carolina
19:00 EDT	Herrera 6', (yellow card) 7'	Report	Ríos 5', 87'; Smith (yellow card) 30'; Igbekoyi (yellow card) 73'; Miller 90+3'	Stadium: Sportsplex at Matthews; Attendance: 1,486; Referee: Ramy Touchan

=== U.S. Open Cup ===
May 16 Second round	North Carolina FC	3–0	(New York (state)) Lansdowne Bhoys FC	Cary, North Carolina
19:00 EDT	Tobin 1'; Smith (yellow card) 38'; Lomis 44'; Luxbacher 74' da Luz (yellow card) 78'	Report		Stadium: Sahlen's Stadium at WakeMed Soccer Park; Attendance: 1,754; Referee: Gabriel Rivera

May 22 Third round	North Carolina FC	4–1	(New Jersey) Ocean City Nor'easters	Cary, North Carolina
19:00 EDT	Lomis 8' da Luz 26'; Fortune 66' (yellow card) 76'; Ewolo 83'	Report	Uros Ilic 17' (yellow card) 53'; Michael Barrow (yellow card) 58'; Jacob Labovitz (yellow card) 84'	Stadium: Sahlen's Stadium at WakeMed Soccer Park; Attendance: 1,778; Referee: Gustavo Solorio

June 5 Fourth round	D.C. United (Washington, D.C.)	1–1 (a.e.t.) (4–3 p)	North Carolina FC	Germantown, Maryland
19:00 EDT	Harkes 25' (yellow card) 80'	Report	Lomis 83'; Kandziora (yellow card) 109'; Smith (yellow card) 115'	Stadium: Maryland SoccerPlex; Attendance: 3,118; Referee: Matthew Franz
	Penalties
	Asad (penalty scored); Mattocks (penalty scored); Acosta (penalty scored); Harkes (penalty missed); Miranda (penalty scored)		(penalty scored) Ríos; (penalty missed) Bekker; (penalty scored) Lomis; (penalty missed) Doue; (penalty scored) Tobin

Schedule Source

== Squad statistics ==
As of Match played October 6, 2018

Source: Match reports

=== Appearances and goals ===
No.	Pos	Nat	Player	Total		USL Regular Season		U.S. Open Cup	
No.	Pos	Nat	Player	Apps	Goals	Apps	Goals	Apps	Goals
1	GK	(Greece) GRE	Alex Tabakis	33	0	32	0	1	0
3	DF	(United States) USA	Peabo Doue	19	1	11+6	1	1+1	0
4	MF	(Nigeria) NGR	Victor Igbekoyi	6	0	5+1	0	0	0
5	DF	(United States) USA	Michael Harrington	24	0	22+1	0	1	0
6	MF	(United States) USA	Austin da Luz	34	5	31	4	3	1
7	MF	(Cameroon) CMR	Donovan Ewolo	29	8	15+13	7	0+1	1
8	MF	(Trinidad and Tobago) TTO	Dre Fortune	18	1	8+7	0	3	1
9	FW	(Netherlands) NED	Marios Lomis	25	8	7+15	5	3	3
10	MF	(Canada) CAN	Kyle Bekker	34	7	28+3	7	3	0
11	FW	(Cape Verde) CPV	Wuilito Fernandes	15	1	7+7	1	0+1	0
13	DF	(United States) USA	Connor Tobin	22	2	19	1	3	1
14	FW	(Mexico) MEX	Daniel Ríos	28	19	23+4	19	0+1	0
15	MF	(United States) USA	Cameron Steele	1	0	0	0	0+1	0
16	MF	(United States) USA	Graham Smith	33	0	31	0	2	0
17	MF	(Austria) AUT	Bernhard Luxbacher	7	1	0+5	0	2	1
18	MF	(Germany) GER	Marcel Kandziora	22	2	13+7	2	1+1	0
22	MF	(South Africa) RSA	Ty Shipalane	21	1	5+15	1	1	0
23	MF	(United States) USA	Zach Steinberger	9	4	9	4	0	0
27	DF	(United States) USA	D.J. Taylor	34	0	30+1	0	2+1	0
30	GK	(United States) USA	Austin Guerrero	3	0	1	0	2	0
31	DF	(United States) USA	Steven Miller	31	4	29+1	4	1	0
33	DF	(United States) USA	Aaron Guillen	26	0	22+1	0	3	0
98	DF	(The Gambia) GAM	Futty Danso	11	0	9	0	1+1	0
99	MF	(El Salvador) ESA	Nelson Blanco	4	0	0+3	0	0+1	0

=== Goal scorers ===
Place	Position	Nation	Number	Name	USL Regular Season	U.S. Open Cup	Total
1	FW	(Mexico)	14	Daniel Ríos	20	0	20
2	FW	(Cameroon)	8	Donovan Ewolo	7	1	8
2	FW	(Netherlands)	9	Marios Lomis	5	3	8
4	MF	(Canada)	10	Kyle Bekker	7	0	7
5	MF	(United States)	6	Austin da Luz	5	1	6
6	MF	(United States)	23	Zach Steinberger	4	0	4
6	DF	(United States)	31	Steven Miller	4	0	4
8	DF	(United States)	13	Connor Tobin	1	1	2
8	MF	(Germany)	18	Marcel Kandziora	2	0	2
10	DF	(United States)	3	Peabo Doue	1	0	1
10	MF	(Trinidad and Tobago)	7	Dre Fortune	0	1	1
10	FW	(Cape Verde)	11	Wuilito Fernandes	1	0	1
10	FW	(Austria)	17	Bernhard Luxbacher	0	1	1
10	MF	(South Africa)	23	Ty Shipalane	1	0	1
TOTALS					58	8	66

=== Disciplinary record ===
Number	Nation	Position	Name	USL Regular Season		U.S. Open Cup		Total	
Number	Nation	Position	Name	Yellow card	Red card	Yellow card	Red card	Yellow card	Red card
3	(United States)	DF	Peabo Doue	1	0	0	0	1	0
4	(Nigeria)	MF	Victor Igbekoyi	2	0	0	0	2	0
5	(United States)	DF	Michael Harrington	2	0	0	0	2	0
6	(United States)	MF	Austin da Luz	5	0	1	0	6	0
7	(Cameroon)	FW	Donovan Ewolo	1	0	0	0	1	0
8	(Trinidad and Tobago)	MF	Dre Fortune	3	0	1	0	4	0
9	(Netherlands)	FW	Marios Lomis	1	0	0	0	1	0
10	(Canada)	MF	Kyle Bekker	6	0	0	0	6	0
11	(Cape Verde)	FW	Wuilito Fernandes	1	0	0	0	1	0
13	(United States)	DF	Connor Tobin	5	0	0	0	5	0
14	(Mexico)	FW	Daniel Ríos	1	0	0	0	1	0
16	(United States)	MF	Graham Smith	6	0	2	0	8	0
18	(Germany)	MF	Marcel Kandziora	5	0	1	0	6	0
23	(United States)	MF	Zach Steinberger	1	0	0	0	1	0
31	(United States)	DF	Aaron Guillen	6	1	0	0	6	1
33	(United States)	DF	Steven Miller	3	0	0	0	3	0
98	(The Gambia)	DF	Futty Danso	1	0	0	0	1	0
99	(El Salvador)	MF	Nelson Blanco	1	0	0	0	1	0
			TOTALS	51	1	5	0	56	1
