= 2018 USL season =

8th season of the USL

United Soccer League
- Season: 2018
- Champions: Louisville City FC (2nd Title)
- Regular season title: FC Cincinnati (1st Title)
- Matches: 561
- Goals: 1,612 (2.87 per match)
- Best player: (Argentina) Emmanuel Ledesma FC Cincinnati
- Top goalscorer: (England) Cameron Lancaster Louisville City FC (25 Goals)
- Best goalkeeper: (United States) Evan Newton FC Cincinnati
- Biggest home win: TBR 5–0 OTT (April 7); LAG 7–2 LVL (May 26); OCO 6–1 TUL (June 23); NYR 6–1 ATL (July 6); LAG 6–1 SLC (September 22)
- Biggest away win: RIC 0–6 LOU (August 25)
- Highest scoring: POR 7–3 LAG (May 18); OKC 6–4 LVL (July 11); NYR 4–6 LOU (August 10)
- Longest winning run: 10 wins FC Cincinnati (August 12 – October 6)
- Longest unbeaten run: 23 games FC Cincinnati (June 2 – October 13) (USL Record)
- Longest winless run: 18 games Toronto FC II (March 17 – July 21)
- Longest losing run: 8 games OKC Energy FC (March 24 – May 9)
- Highest attendance: 31,478; CIN 3–0 IND (September 29) (USL Record)
- Lowest attendance: 50; TOR 0–0 NCA (April 18)
- Total attendance: 2,756,759
- Average attendance: 4,923
- All statistics correct as of November 8, 2018.

The 2018 USL season was the eighth season of the United Soccer League and second under Division II sanctioning. The previous season, the USL had provisional Div. II sanctioning from the United States Soccer Federation (U.S. Soccer) along with the North American Soccer League, but was given full sanctioning for the 2018 season with a two-year deadline to meet the full requirements set by U.S. Soccer.

Louisville City FC were the defending USL Cup champions, while Real Monarchs were the defending Supporters' Shield champions.

This season was the last for four teams in the USL, with all changing leagues for 2019 and beyond. FC Cincinnati will join Major League Soccer. MLS side Toronto FC announced that its reserve side, Toronto FC II, would drop to USL League One, a third-level league slated to launch in 2019, and the Richmond Kickers also chose to drop to League One for 2019 and beyond. Near the end of the season, Penn FC announced that it would suspend professional operations for 2019 and resume play in League One in 2020.

It was also the final season for the league under the "United Soccer League" name. Effective with the 2019 season, the league has been rebranded as the USL Championship.

== Changes from 2017 ==
Expansion

- Atlanta United 2
- Fresno FC
- Las Vegas Lights FC
- Nashville SC

Joined from NASL

- Indy Eleven
- North Carolina FC

On hiatus

- Orlando City B
  - During the 2018 season, City B's MLS parent, Orlando City SC, announced that City B would resume play in 2019 as a founding member of USL League One.
- Rochester Rhinos
  - During the 2018 season, the Rhinos announced they would not return to the USL's top flight. The team will not resume professional operations until the 2020 season, at which time it will join USL League One.

Folded

- Vancouver Whitecaps 2

== Rule changes ==
Regular season games will now be considered official after the 70th minute. Teams are allowed a fourth substitution in extra time for the USL Playoffs. Teams will submit a 23-player squad at least 48 hours before kickoff. A team's 18-player gameday roster may now contain a maximum of five players signed to USL Academy contracts.

== Teams ==
Locations of teams for the 2018 United Soccer League season
Western Conference Eastern Conference

| Team | Location | Stadium | Capacity | Head coach | MLS affiliate/ownership | First Match's Goalkeeper |
|---|---|---|---|---|---|---|
| Atlanta United 2 | Lawrenceville, Georgia/Kennesaw, Georgia | Coolray Field/Fifth Third Bank Stadium | 10,427 | (United States) Scott Donnelly | Atlanta United FC | (United States) Alec Kann |
| Bethlehem Steel FC | Bethlehem, Pennsylvania | Goodman Stadium | 16,000 | (United States) Brendan Burke | Philadelphia Union | (United States) John McCarthy |
| Charleston Battery | Charleston, South Carolina | MUSC Health Stadium | 5,100 | (United States) Michael Anhaeuser | | (Cuba) Odisnel Cooper |
| Charlotte Independence | Matthews, North Carolina | Sportsplex at Matthews | 5,000 | (United States) Mike Jeffries | Colorado Rapids | (United States) Andrew Dykstra |
| Colorado Springs Switchbacks FC | Colorado Springs, Colorado | Switchbacks Training Stadium | 5,000 | (United States) Steve Trittschuh | | (Haiti) Steward Ceus |
| FC Cincinnati | Cincinnati, Ohio | Nippert Stadium | 35,061 | (South Africa) Alan Koch | | (United States) Evan Newton |
| Fresno FC | Fresno, California | Chukchansi Park | 12,500 | (England) Adam Smith | Vancouver Whitecaps FC | (United States) Kyle Reynish |
| Indy Eleven | Indianapolis, Indiana | Lucas Oil Stadium | 62,421 | (Scotland) Martin Rennie | | (Wales) Owain Fôn Williams |
| LA Galaxy II | Carson, California | StubHub Center Track & Field Facility | 5,000 | (United States) Mike Muñoz | LA Galaxy | (United States) Justin Vom Steeg |
| Las Vegas Lights FC | Las Vegas, Nevada | Cashman Field | 9,334 | (Canada) Isidro Sánchez | | (Mexico) Ricardo Ferriño |
| Louisville City FC | Louisville, Kentucky | Louisville Slugger Field | 8,000 | (United States) John Hackworth | | (Trinidad and Tobago) Greg Ranjitsingh |
| Nashville SC | Nashville, Tennessee | First Tennessee Park/Nissan Stadium | 8,500 69,143 | (England) Gary Smith | | (United States) Matt Pickens |
| New York Red Bulls II | Montclair, New Jersey/Harrison, New Jersey | MSU Soccer Park at Pittser Field/Red Bull Arena | 5,000 25,000 | (United States) John Wolyniec | New York Red Bulls | (United States) Evan Louro |
| North Carolina FC | Cary, North Carolina | Sahlen's Stadium at WakeMed Soccer Park | 10,000 | (Northern Ireland) Colin Clarke | | (Greece) Alexander Tambakis |
| OKC Energy FC | Oklahoma City, Oklahoma | Taft Stadium | 7,500 | (England) Steve Cooke | FC Dallas | (United States) Matt Van Oekel |
| Orange County SC | Irvine, California | Championship Soccer Stadium | 5,000 | (United States) Braeden Cloutier | Los Angeles FC | (United States) Andre Rawls |
| Ottawa Fury FC | Ottawa, Ontario | TD Place Stadium | 24,000 | (Serbia) Nikola Popovic | Montreal Impact | (Canada) Callum Irving |
| Penn FC | Harrisburg, Pennsylvania | FNB Field | 6,187 | (Germany) Raoul Voss | | (France) Romuald Peiser |
| Phoenix Rising FC | Scottsdale, Arizona | Phoenix Rising Soccer Complex | 6,200 | (United States) Rick Schantz (interim) | | (United States) Carl Woszczynski |
| Pittsburgh Riverhounds SC | Pittsburgh, Pennsylvania | Highmark Stadium | 5,000 | (United States) Bob Lilley | | (United States) Daniel Lynd |
| Portland Timbers 2 | Portland, Oregon | Providence Park/Merlo Field | 21,144 5,000 | (New Zealand) Cameron Knowles | Portland Timbers | (United States) Alex Mangels |
| Real Monarchs | Herriman, Utah/Sandy, Utah | Zions Bank Stadium/Rio Tinto Stadium | 5,000 20,213 | (Colombia) Jámison Olave (interim) | Real Salt Lake | (United States) Alex Horwath |
| Reno 1868 FC | Reno, Nevada | Greater Nevada Field | 9,013 | (United States) Ian Russell | San Jose Earthquakes | (United States) JT Marcinkowski |
| Richmond Kickers | Richmond, Virginia | City Stadium | 22,000 | (United States) David Bulow | D.C. United | (United States) Travis Worra |
| Rio Grande Valley FC Toros | Edinburg, Texas | H-E-B Park | 9,400 | (United States) Gerson Echeverry | Houston Dynamo | (Belgium) Nico Corti |
| Sacramento Republic FC | Sacramento, California | Papa Murphy's Park | 11,569 | (New Zealand) Simon Elliott | | (United States) Josh Cohen |
| Saint Louis FC | Fenton, Missouri | Toyota Stadium | 5,500 | (Wales) Anthony Pulis | Minnesota United FC | (United States) Jake Fenlason |
| San Antonio FC | San Antonio, Texas | Toyota Field | 8,296 | (England) Darren Powell | New York City FC | (United States) Diego Restrepo |
| Seattle Sounders FC 2 | Tacoma, Washington | Cheney Stadium | 6,500 | (Malta) John Hutchinson | Seattle Sounders FC | (United States) Calle Brown |
| Swope Park Rangers | Kansas City, Kansas/Overland Park, Kansas | Children's Mercy Park/Shawnee Mission District Stadium | 18,467 6,150 | (Brazil) Paulo Nagamura | Sporting Kansas City | (Mexico) Adrian Zendejas |
| Tampa Bay Rowdies | St. Petersburg, Florida | Al Lang Stadium | 7,227 | (Scotland) Neill Collins | | (United States) Cody Mizell |
| Toronto FC II | Toronto, Ontario | Lamport Stadium | 9,600 | (United States) Michael Rabasca | Toronto FC | (Canada) Angelo Cavalluzzo |
| Tulsa Roughnecks FC | Tulsa, Oklahoma | ONEOK Field | 7,833 | (Nigeria) Michael Nsien (interim) | Chicago Fire | (Chile) Fabian Cerda |

MLS-affiliated
MLS-owned

=== Other venues ===
- Four Toronto FC II home games were played at Marina Auto Stadium in Rochester, New York.
- Nashville's March 24 game against Pittsburgh, and the July 7 game against FC Cincinnati, were played at Nissan Stadium.
- Toronto's May 9 game against Penn FC was moved to Monarch Park Stadium due to BMO Field needing time to recover due to a busy early schedule.
- The conclusion of a suspended game from June 16 between Atlanta United 2 and Ottawa was played August 7 at Fifth Third Bank Stadium in Kennesaw, Georgia.

== Competition format ==
The season began on March 16 and ends on October 14. The top eight finishers in each conference qualify for the playoffs.

=== Managerial changes ===
| Team | Outgoing manager | Manner of departure | Date of vacancy | Incoming manager | Date of appointment |
|---|---|---|---|---|---|
| Rio Grande Valley FC Toros | (United States) Junior Gonzalez | Resigned | November 8, 2017 | (United States) Gerson Echeverry | December 6, 2017 |
| Pittsburgh Riverhounds SC | (United States) Dave Brandt | Ineligible | November 14, 2017 | (United States) Bob Lilley | November 14, 2017 |
| Oklahoma City Energy FC | (Denmark) Jimmy Nielsen | Resigned | November 16, 2017 | (England) Steve Cooke | December 19, 2017 |
| Swope Park Rangers | (Serbia) Nikola Popovic | Mutual separation | November 17, 2017 | (Brazil) Paulo Nagamura | November 30, 2017 |
| Saint Louis FC | (United States) Preki | Mutual separation | November 20, 2017 | (Wales) Anthony Pulis | November 21, 2017 |
| Orange County SC | (United States) Logan Pause | Mutual separation | November 27, 2017 | (United States) Braeden Cloutier | December 14, 2017 |
| Ottawa Fury FC | (Canada) Julian de Guzman | Interim | December 12, 2017 | (Serbia) Nikola Popovic | December 12, 2017 |
| Portland Timbers 2 | (United States) Andrew Gregor | Moved to assistant coach | January 8, 2018 | (New Zealand) Cameron Knowles | January 8, 2018 |
| Toronto FC II | (Canada) Jason Bent | Promotion | January 26, 2018 | (France) Laurent Guyot | January 26, 2018 |
| Seattle Sounders FC 2 | (Saint Vincent and the Grenadines) Ezra Hendrickson | Resigned | January 30, 2018 | (Malta) John Hutchinson | January 30, 2018 |
| Tampa Bay Rowdies | (Scotland) Stuart Campbell | Resigned | May 17, 2018 | (Scotland) Neill Collins | May 18, 2018 |
| Toronto FC II | (France) Laurent Guyot | Mutual separation | June 1, 2018 | (United States) Michael Rabasca | June 4, 2018 |
| Phoenix Rising FC | (France) Patrice Carteron | Left to manage (Egypt) Al Ahly SC | June 12, 2018 | (United States) Rick Schantz (Interim) | June 12, 2018 |
| Tulsa Roughnecks FC | (United States) David Vaudreuil | Fired | June 25, 2018 | (Nigeria) Michael Nsien (Interim) | June 25, 2018 |
| Richmond Kickers | (England) Leigh Cowlishaw | Resigned | June 26, 2018 | (United States) David Bulow | June 27, 2018 |
| Louisville City FC | (Republic of Ireland) James O'Connor | Left to manage Orlando City SC | June 30, 2018 | (United States) Player Coaches ‡ | July 1, 2018 |
| Louisville City FC | (United States) Player Coaches ‡ | Return to player duties | August 2, 2018 | (United States) John Hackworth | August 2, 2018 |
| Real Monarchs | (England) Mark Briggs | Resigned | August 24, 2018 | (Colombia) Jámison Olave (Interim) | August 24, 2018 |

‡ Luke Spencer, Paolo DelPiccolo, & George Davis IV appointed joint interim head coaches.

== League table ==
Eastern Conference

| Pos | Team | Pld | W | D | L | GF | GA | GD | Pts | Qualification |
|---|---|---|---|---|---|---|---|---|---|---|
| 1 | FC Cincinnati (X) | 34 | 23 | 8 | 3 | 72 | 34 | +38 | 77 | Conference Playoffs |
| 2 | Louisville City FC (C) | 34 | 19 | 9 | 6 | 71 | 38 | +33 | 66 | Conference Playoffs |
| 3 | Pittsburgh Riverhounds SC | 34 | 15 | 14 | 5 | 47 | 26 | +21 | 59 | Conference Playoffs |
| 4 | Charleston Battery | 34 | 14 | 14 | 6 | 47 | 34 | +13 | 56 | Conference Playoffs |
| 5 | New York Red Bulls II | 34 | 13 | 13 | 8 | 71 | 59 | +12 | 52 | Conference Playoffs |
| 6 | Bethlehem Steel FC | 34 | 14 | 8 | 12 | 56 | 41 | +15 | 50 | Conference Playoffs |
| 7 | Indy Eleven | 34 | 13 | 10 | 11 | 45 | 42 | +3 | 49 | Conference Playoffs |
| 8 | Nashville SC | 34 | 12 | 13 | 9 | 42 | 31 | +11 | 49 | Conference Playoffs |
| 9 | North Carolina FC | 34 | 13 | 8 | 13 | 60 | 50 | +10 | 47 | |
| 10 | Ottawa Fury | 34 | 13 | 6 | 15 | 31 | 43 | −12 | 45 | |
| 11 | Charlotte Independence | 34 | 10 | 12 | 12 | 44 | 57 | −13 | 42 | |
| 12 | Tampa Bay Rowdies | 34 | 11 | 8 | 15 | 44 | 44 | 0 | 41 | |
| 13 | Penn FC | 34 | 9 | 10 | 15 | 38 | 47 | −9 | 37 | |
| 14 | Atlanta United 2 | 34 | 7 | 10 | 17 | 37 | 72 | −35 | 31 | |
| 15 | Richmond Kickers | 34 | 6 | 4 | 24 | 30 | 80 | −50 | 22 | |
| 16 | Toronto FC II | 34 | 4 | 6 | 24 | 42 | 77 | −35 | 18 | |

Source: 2018 USL standings
Rules for classification: 1) total wins; 2) total goal differential; 3) total goals scored; 4) points earned against top four Conference finishers; 5) disciplinary points; 6) coin toss or drawing of lots
(C) Champions; (X) Regular Season League Champion

Western Conference

| Pos | Team | Pld | W | D | L | GF | GA | GD | Pts | Qualification |
|---|---|---|---|---|---|---|---|---|---|---|
| 1 | Orange County SC | 34 | 20 | 6 | 8 | 70 | 40 | +30 | 66 | Conference Playoffs |
| 2 | Sacramento Republic | 34 | 19 | 8 | 7 | 47 | 32 | +15 | 65 | Conference Playoffs |
| 3 | Phoenix Rising FC | 34 | 19 | 6 | 9 | 63 | 38 | +25 | 63 | Conference Playoffs |
| 4 | Real Monarchs | 34 | 19 | 3 | 12 | 55 | 47 | +8 | 60 | Conference Playoffs |
| 5 | Reno 1868 FC | 34 | 16 | 11 | 7 | 56 | 38 | +18 | 59 | Conference Playoffs |
| 6 | Portland Timbers 2 | 34 | 17 | 4 | 13 | 58 | 49 | +9 | 55 | Conference Playoffs |
| 7 | Swope Park Rangers | 34 | 15 | 8 | 11 | 52 | 53 | −1 | 53 | Conference Playoffs |
| 8 | Saint Louis FC | 34 | 14 | 11 | 9 | 44 | 38 | +6 | 53 | Conference Playoffs |
| 9 | San Antonio FC | 34 | 14 | 8 | 12 | 45 | 48 | −3 | 50 | |
| 10 | OKC Energy FC | 34 | 12 | 7 | 15 | 43 | 46 | −3 | 43 | |
| 11 | Colorado Springs Switchbacks | 34 | 11 | 6 | 17 | 36 | 39 | −3 | 39 | |
| 12 | Fresno FC | 34 | 9 | 12 | 13 | 44 | 38 | +6 | 39 | |
| 13 | Rio Grande Valley Toros | 34 | 8 | 14 | 12 | 36 | 42 | −6 | 38 | |
| 14 | LA Galaxy II | 34 | 10 | 7 | 17 | 60 | 67 | −7 | 37 | |
| 15 | Las Vegas Lights FC | 34 | 8 | 7 | 19 | 50 | 74 | −24 | 31 | |
| 16 | Seattle Sounders FC 2 | 34 | 6 | 7 | 21 | 40 | 71 | −31 | 25 | |
| 17 | Tulsa Roughnecks | 34 | 3 | 12 | 19 | 36 | 77 | −41 | 21 | |

Source: 2018 USL standings
Rules for classification: 1) total wins; 2) total goal differential; 3) total goals scored; 4) points earned against top four Conference finishers; 5) disciplinary points; 6) coin toss or drawing of lots

== Results table ==
Color Key: Home • Away • Neutral • Win • Loss • Draw
| Club | Match | | | | | | | | | | | | | | | | | | | | | | | | | | | | | | | | | |
| Club | 1 | 2 | 3 | 4 | 5 | 6 | 7 | 8 | 9 | 10 | 11 | 12 | 13 | 14 | 15 | 16 | 17 | 18 | 19 | 20 | 21 | 22 | 23 | 24 | 25 | 26 | 27 | 28 | 29 | 30 | 31 | 32 | 33 | 34 |
|---|---|---|---|---|---|---|---|---|---|---|---|---|---|---|---|---|---|---|---|---|---|---|---|---|---|---|---|---|---|---|---|---|---|---|
| Atlanta United 2 (ATL) | NYR | CLT | PEN | LOU | CHS | PGH | CIN | OTT | TOR | LOU | NCA | TBR | IND | CLT | NSH | NYR | BST | RIC | NSH | BST | OTT | CHS | CIN | IND | TOR | PEN | TBR | NCA | NSH | LOU | TBR | CHS | PGH | RIC |
| Atlanta United 2 (ATL) | 3–1 | 2–2 | 1–1 | 1–1 | 0–3 | 0–1 | 2–4 | 0–2 | 5–4 | 1–2 | 0–4 | 0–0 | 0–2 | 1–1 | 0–3 | 1–6 | 2–1 | 1–1 | 0–1 | 1–4 | 1–1 | 0–1 | 1–5 | 1–1 | 2–1 | 2–1 | 0–1 | 1–6 | 0–2 | 1–4 | 1–1 | 2–1 | 1–1 | 3–2 |
| Bethlehem Steel FC (BST) | RIC | TBR | NSH | CHS | CIN | LOU | RIC | CHS | NYR | IND | OTT | NCA | LOU | CIN | NYR | CLT | PEN | ATL | NCA | NYR | IND | ATL | RIC | CLT | PGH | TOR | OTT | NSH | PEN | PGH | TOR | OTT | IND | TBR |
| Bethlehem Steel FC (BST) | 4–1 | 0–2 | 0–1 | 1–1 | 1–1 | 1–3 | 3–1 | 1–2 | 3–0 | 2–1 | 0–1 | 2–1 | 0–0 | 2–2 | 2–2 | 4–1 | 2–3 | 1–2 | 1–1 | 1–2 | 0–1 | 4–1 | 3–0 | 3–0 | 1–2 | 2–0 | 2–0 | 2–1 | 1–3 | 1–4 | 4–0 | 0–0 | 1–1 | 1–0 |
| Charleston Battery (CHS) | CIN | PEN | NYR | BST | PEN | ATL | TBR | CLT | BST | OTT | NSH | IND | RIC | CLT | PGH | TOR | NCA | IND | LOU | PGH | RIC | NCA | TBR | ATL | CIN | NYR | LOU | TBR | CLT | NSH | NCA | TOR | ATL | OTT |
| Charleston Battery (CHS) | 0–1 | 1–0 | 2–5 | 1–1 | 1–1 | 3–0 | 1–0 | 2–0 | 2–1 | 0–0 | 1–1 | 3–3 | 0–2 | 1–1 | 0–0 | 4–0 | 1–1 | 2–1 | 2–1 | 1–0 | 3–0 | 0–0 | 0–0 | 1–0 | 0–3 | 4–4 | 2–2 | 1–0 | 1–1 | 1–1 | 2–0 | 1–2 | 1–2 | 2–0 |
| Charlotte Independence (CLT) | OTT | TOR | ATL | NSH | NCA | IND | CHS | CIN | TOR | RIC | OTT | NYR | ATL | CHS | RIC | TBR | BST | IND | NSH | CIN | LOU | PEN | BST | PGH | LOU | NCA | NSH | RIC | CHS | NYR | PGH | PEN | TBR | NCA |
| Charlotte Independence (CLT) | 4–1 | 2–0 | 2–2 | 0–2 | 0–2 | 0–0 | 0–2 | 4–1 | 2–1 | 3–1 | 1–0 | 2–4 | 1–1 | 1–1 | 1–1 | 2–2 | 1–4 | 1–2 | 1–0 | 0–2 | 1–4 | 1–1 | 0–3 | 0–0 | 0–3 | 2–6 | 1–0 | 2–1 | 1–1 | 1–1 | 2–2 | 2–2 | 2–1 | 1–3 |
| FC Cincinnati (CIN) | CHS | IND | LOU | BST | PGH | OTT | IND | ATL | CLT | NCA | LOU | NYR | NCA | BST | RIC | TOR | OTT | NSH | TBR | CLT | NYR | NSH | PEN | CHS | ATL | TBR | PGH | LOU | TOR | PEN | RIC | IND | PGH | NSH |
| FC Cincinnati (CIN) | 1–0 | 1–0 | 0–1 | 1–1 | 2–2 | 3–0 | 3–2 | 4–2 | 1–4 | 4–1 | 0–2 | 2–1 | 2–0 | 2–2 | 4–0 | 3–3 | 2–0 | 0–0 | 2–0 | 2–0 | 2–1 | 1–1 | 1–0 | 3–0 | 5–1 | 2–1 | 2–1 | 1–0 | 4–3 | 2–1 | 4–1 | 3–0 | 0–0 | 3–3 |
| Colorado Springs Switchbacks (COS) | LAG | POR | STL | SPR | RGV | RNO | SAC | SEA | OCO | RNO | LVL | OKC | STL | LVL | SPR | POR | FRS | SAN | OCO | OKC | SAC | TUL | SAN | RGV | OKC | TUL | PHX | SLC | LAG | RGV | PHX | SLC | FRS | SEA |
| Colorado Springs Switchbacks (COS) | 2–0 | 0–1 | 0–1 | 0–1 | 2–1 | 4–0 | 1–2 | 0–0 | 0–1 | 0–0 | 1–0 | 0–1 | 3–0 | 1–4 | 0–1 | 4–1 | 1–0 | 1–1 | 0–1 | 1–1 | 0–1 | 4–2 | 0–1 | 0–1 | 2–0 | 1–2 | 0–4 | 1–0 | 1–3 | 1–1 | 1–2 | 2–0 | 0–3 | 2–2 |
| Fresno FC (FRS) | LVL | LAG | SEA | OKC | STL | TUL | SAN | PHX | SAN | RGV | SLC | OCO | SEA | RNO | SAC | SPR | COS | SLC | SAC | POR | PHX | OKC | TUL | SAC | LAG | STL | LVL | RNO | SPR | OCO | POR | RGV | COS | SLC |
| Fresno FC (FRS) | 2–3 | 1–1 | 1–0 | 2–1 | 1–1 | 2–2 | 0–0 | 1–1 | 1–2 | 2–2 | 0–1 | 0–3 | 4–0 | 1–1 | 0–1 | 4–1 | 0–1 | 0–1 | 2–0 | 4–2 | 4–0 | 0–0 | 1–1 | 0–1 | 1–2 | 1–0 | 2–2 | 1–1 | 0–1 | 0–1 | 2–2 | 1–2 | 3–0 | 0–1 |
| Indy Eleven (IND) | RIC | CIN | NCA | NSH | CLT | CIN | LOU | PGH | BST | NYR | CHS | ATL | TOR | NSH | PEN | OTT | CLT | CHS | TBR | BST | LOU | NCA | OTT | TOR | ATL | PGH | RIC | NYR | PEN | PGH | TBR | CIN | BST | LOU |
| Indy Eleven (IND) | 1–0 | 0–1 | 1–0 | 2–1 | 0–0 | 2–3 | 1–0 | 0–0 | 1–2 | 1–4 | 3–3 | 2–0 | 3–1 | 2–0 | 1–1 | 0–1 | 2–1 | 1–2 | 1–3 | 1–0 | 2–2 | 3–2 | 0–0 | 3–2 | 1–1 | 2–2 | 1–1 | 3–0 | 0–1 | 2–3 | 2–0 | 0–3 | 1–1 | 0–1 |
| Las Vegas Lights (LVL) | FRS | RNO | SPR | SAC | SAN | SLC | TUL | COS | SLC | LAG | COS | PHX | SEA | SPR | TUL | STL | OKC | RGV | POR | SEA | RGV | STL | OCO | PHX | FRS | RNO | LAG | POR | RNO | OCO | OKC | SAN | PHX | SAC |
| Las Vegas Lights (LVL) | 3–2 | 1–1 | 2–1 | 1–1 | 1–3 | 0–0 | 1–1 | 0–1 | 0–2 | 2–7 | 4–1 | 0–4 | 4–1 | 2–3 | 2–2 | 1–0 | 4–6 | 0–2 | 2–1 | 0–3 | 1–0 | 1–4 | 1–3 | 0–2 | 2–2 | 1–2 | 1–2 | 1–2 | 3–3 | 3–5 | 0–1 | 1–3 | 5–2 | 0–1 |
| LA Galaxy II (LAG) | COS | FRS | SAN | OCO | PHX | STL | NYR | PHX | STL | POR | RGV | LVL | TUL | OCO | OKC | TUL | SEA | OCO | RNO | POR | SPR | SAN | FRS | SAC | RGV | SLC | COS | LVL | OKC | RNO | SLC | SEA | SAC | SPR |
| LA Galaxy II (LAG) | 0–2 | 1–1 | 0–0 | 0–3 | 0–1 | 0–1 | 1–1 | 3–4 | 6–3 | 3–7 | 1–1 | 7–2 | 1–0 | 0–1 | 0–1 | 0–2 | 5–3 | 3–0 | 1–4 | 3–4 | 1–1 | 1–2 | 2–1 | 4–1 | 1–1 | 0–4 | 3–1 | 2–1 | 1–3 | 0–1 | 6–1 | 2–2 | 1–2 | 1–5 |
| Louisville City FC (LOU) | NSH | TBR | CIN | RIC | ATL | BST | IND | NSH | ATL | CIN | BST | PEN | NCA | PGH | NYR | TBR | CHS | CLT | OTT | IND | NYR | NSH | CLT | RIC | TOR | CHS | CIN | PGH | PEN | OTT | ATL | TOR | NCA | IND |
| Louisville City FC (LOU) | 2–0 | 1–0 | 1–0 | 2–1 | 1–1 | 3–1 | 0–1 | 0–2 | 2–1 | 2–0 | 0–0 | 3–3 | 2–2 | 0–1 | 3–3 | 2–1 | 1–2 | 4–1 | 3–0 | 2–2 | 6–4 | 0–0 | 3–0 | 6–0 | 1–4 | 2–2 | 0–1 | 2–2 | 3–0 | 4–0 | 4–1 | 3–1 | 2–1 | 1–0 |
| Nashville SC (NSH) | LOU | PGH | BST | CLT | IND | PEN | NYR | LOU | CHS | PGH | PEN | TBR | NCA | IND | ATL | CIN | CLT | OTT | ATL | TOR | CIN | OTT | LOU | BST | RIC | CLT | NCA | TBR | CHS | ATL | NYR | RIC | TOR | CIN |
| Nashville SC (NSH) | 0–2 | 0–0 | 1–0 | 2–0 | 1–2 | 0–0 | 1–1 | 2–0 | 1–1 | 1–0 | 3–1 | 1–1 | 1–0 | 0–2 | 3–0 | 0–0 | 0–1 | 0–2 | 1–0 | 0–2 | 1–1 | 2–0 | 0–0 | 1–2 | 4–0 | 0–1 | 3–3 | 1–2 | 1–1 | 2–0 | 1–1 | 3–0 | 2–2 | 3–3 |
| New York Red Bulls II (NYR) | TOR | ATL | CHS | RIC | TBR | LAG | TOR | OTT | NSH | BST | IND | CIN | CLT | PGH | BST | OTT | LOU | ATL | RIC | BST | CIN | TBR | PEN | LOU | NCA | CHS | OTT | IND | TOR | CLT | NSH | NCA | PEN | PGH |
| New York Red Bulls II (NYR) | 2–1 | 1–3 | 5–2 | 1–1 | 4–0 | 1–1 | 0–0 | 0–0 | 1–1 | 0–3 | 4–1 | 1–2 | 4–2 | 0–3 | 2–2 | 0–3 | 3–3 | 6–1 | 5–1 | 2–1 | 1–2 | 2–2 | 2–1 | 4–6 | 2–2 | 4–4 | 1–0 | 0–3 | 3–3 | 1–1 | 1–1 | 2–1 | 3–1 | 2–1 |
| North Carolina FC (NCA) | TBR | RIC | IND | CLT | TOR | OTT | PEN | CIN | ATL | BST | CIN | OTT | NSH | LOU | RIC | PGH | CHS | BST | TOR | PGH | CHS | TBR | IND | NYR | CLT | TBR | NSH | PEN | ATL | CHS | RIC | NYR | LOU | CLT |
| North Carolina FC (NCA) | 1–3 | 1–2 | 0–1 | 2–0 | 0–0 | 1–1 | 3–0 | 1–4 | 4–0 | 1–2 | 0–2 | 4–2 | 0–1 | 2–2 | 3–1 | 0–2 | 1–1 | 1–1 | 3–1 | 2–1 | 0–0 | 2–0 | 2–3 | 2–2 | 6–2 | 0–3 | 3–3 | 1–0 | 6–1 | 0–2 | 3–2 | 1–2 | 1–2 | 3–1 |
| Oklahoma City Energy (OKC) | TUL | PHX | OCO | FRS | POR | STL | RNO | SPR | PHX | COS | TUL | RNO | SEA | POR | RGV | LAG | SAN | COS | LVL | SAC | FRS | SAN | COS | TUL | SLC | RGV | SEA | SPR | OCO | LAG | SAC | LVL | SLC | STL |
| Oklahoma City Energy (OKC) | 1–0 | 1–4 | 0–1 | 1–2 | 0–3 | 0–1 | 0–2 | 0–1 | 0–3 | 1–0 | 1–1 | 1–2 | 1–2 | 2–1 | 3–1 | 1–0 | 1–1 | 1–1 | 6–4 | 1–1 | 0–0 | 1–2 | 0–2 | 3–0 | 3–2 | 4–2 | 3–0 | 0–1 | 2–3 | 3–1 | 0–0 | 1–0 | 1–2 | 0–0 |
| Orange County SC (OCO) | PHX | SAC | OKC | TUL | LAG | SAN | RGV | COS | SLC | STL | FRS | SAC | LAG | RNO | TUL | PHX | COS | LAG | SAN | SPR | STL | POR | SPR | PHX | LVL | POR | RGV | SEA | OKC | FRS | SLC | LVL | SEA | RNO |
| Orange County SC (OCO) | 1–1 | 0–1 | 1–0 | 5–0 | 3–0 | 3–0 | 0–2 | 1–0 | 1–2 | 1–1 | 3–0 | 0–1 | 1–0 | 2–2 | 6–1 | 0–1 | 1–0 | 0–3 | 3–0 | 4–0 | 2–2 | 2–2 | 2–1 | 4–3 | 3–1 | 3–2 | 0–2 | 1–1 | 3–2 | 1–0 | 5–2 | 5–3 | 2–1 | 1–3 |
| Ottawa Fury FC (OTT) | CLT | TBR | PGH | NCA | CIN | NYR | PEN | ATL | CHS | BST | TOR | CLT | NCA | NYR | CIN | IND | PGH | PEN | NSH | LOU | TBR | ATL | NSH | RIC | IND | BST | PEN | NYR | TOR | RIC | LOU | TOR | BST | CHS |
| Ottawa Fury FC (OTT) | 1–4 | 0–5 | 0–1 | 1–1 | 0–3 | 0–0 | 1–0 | 2–0 | 0–0 | 1–0 | 3–0 | 0–1 | 2–4 | 3–0 | 0–2 | 1–0 | 0–1 | 2–1 | 2–0 | 0–3 | 2–0 | 1–1 | 0–2 | 2–0 | 0–0 | 0–2 | 0–2 | 0–1 | 4–3 | 2–0 | 0–4 | 1–0 | 0–0 | 0–2 |
| Penn FC (PEN) | CHS | PGH | ATL | CHS | NSH | NCA | TBR | OTT | TOR | PGH | NSH | TOR | RIC | LOU | TBR | IND | BST | RIC | OTT | CLT | NYR | CIN | RIC | OTT | BST | ATL | IND | NCA | LOU | CIN | PGH | CLT | NYR | TOR |
| Penn FC (PEN) | 0–1 | 0–0 | 1–1 | 1–1 | 0–0 | 0–3 | 3–0 | 0–1 | 1–0 | 0–0 | 1–3 | 3–2 | 2–1 | 3–3 | 2–1 | 1–1 | 3–2 | 1–2 | 1–2 | 1–1 | 1–2 | 0–1 | 2–3 | 2–0 | 3–1 | 1–2 | 1–0 | 0–1 | 0–3 | 1–2 | 0–2 | 2–2 | 1–3 | 0–0 |
| Phoenix Rising FC (PHX) | OCO | OKC | RNO | SLC | LAG | SPR | FRS | LAG | OKC | TUL | SAC | SPR | STL | SAC | LVL | TUL | RGV | OCO | FRS | SEA | SLC | POR | OCO | LVL | SAN | COS | RGV | SAN | SEA | COS | STL | RNO | LVL | POR |
| Phoenix Rising FC (PHX) | 1–1 | 4–1 | 1–0 | 0–1 | 1–0 | 2–2 | 1–1 | 4–3 | 3–0 | 5–1 | 1–3 | 0–1 | 3–1 | 0–0 | 4–0 | 3–0 | 0–0 | 1–0 | 0–4 | 1–0 | 1–4 | 4–1 | 3–4 | 2–0 | 4–0 | 4–0 | 1–0 | 2–3 | 1–0 | 2–1 | 2–0 | 0–0 | 2–5 | 0–1 |
| Pittsburgh Riverhounds (PGH) | NSH | PEN | TOR | OTT | CIN | ATL | TOR | IND | TBR | PEN | NSH | RIC | NYR | CHS | LOU | NCA | OTT | CHS | NCA | RIC | TOR | BST | CLT | TBR | IND | CIN | BST | LOU | IND | PEN | CLT | CIN | ATL | NYR |
| Pittsburgh Riverhounds (PGH) | 0–0 | 0–0 | 4–0 | 1–0 | 2–2 | 1–0 | 2–1 | 0–0 | 2–2 | 0–0 | 0–1 | 2–1 | 3–0 | 0–0 | 1–0 | 2–0 | 1–0 | 0–1 | 1–2 | 3–0 | 1–0 | 2–1 | 0–0 | 1–1 | 2–2 | 1–2 | 4–1 | 2–2 | 3–2 | 2–0 | 2–2 | 0–0 | 1–1 | 1–2 |
| Portland Timbers 2 (POR) | SEA | COS | SLC | TUL | OKC | RGV | RNO | SAC | STL | SEA | LAG | SLC | SAN | RGV | OKC | COS | RNO | FRS | SPR | LVL | LAG | OCO | PHX | SPR | SAN | SEA | OCO | STL | TUL | LVL | FRS | SAC | RNO | PHX |
| Portland Timbers 2 (POR) | 1–2 | 1–0 | 2–4 | 0–0 | 3–0 | 3–2 | 1–2 | 2–0 | 0–0 | 1–0 | 7–3 | 1–0 | 1–2 | 1–0 | 1–2 | 1–4 | 0–1 | 2–4 | 2–1 | 1–2 | 4–3 | 2–2 | 1–4 | 2–0 | 2–1 | 4–1 | 2–3 | 1–0 | 4–0 | 2–1 | 2–2 | 0–1 | 0–2 | 1–0 |
| Real Monarchs (SLC) | TUL | POR | PHX | SEA | TBR | LVL | OCO | SPR | FRS | LVL | POR | SAC | RGV | SPR | STL | FRS | RNO | SAC | SEA | SAN | PHX | RNO | OKC | TUL | LAG | COS | SAN | RGV | STL | OCO | LAG | COS | OKC | FRS |
| Real Monarchs (SLC) | 3–2 | 4–2 | 1–0 | 3–1 | 0–2 | 0–0 | 2–1 | 4–1 | 1–0 | 2–0 | 0–1 | 1–0 | 2–0 | 2–3 | 1–0 | 1–0 | 0–3 | 0–0 | 2–0 | 2–4 | 4–1 | 2–1 | 2–3 | 3–2 | 4–0 | 0–1 | 1–2 | 1–2 | 1–1 | 2–5 | 1–6 | 0–2 | 2–1 | 1–0 |
| Reno 1868 FC (RNO) | SPR | LVL | PHX | COS | POR | OKC | RGV | COS | TUL | SAC | SEA | SAN | OKC | FRS | OCO | SAN | POR | SLC | SEA | LAG | STL | SLC | SPR | SAC | LVL | FRS | STL | LAG | LVL | RGV | TUL | POR | PHX | OCO |
| Reno 1868 FC (RNO) | 3–4 | 1–1 | 0–1 | 0–4 | 2–1 | 2–0 | 0–0 | 0–0 | 1–1 | 3–2 | 1–1 | 2–1 | 2–1 | 1–1 | 2–2 | 2–0 | 1–0 | 3–0 | 2–1 | 4–1 | 1–2 | 1–2 | 3–3 | 1–2 | 2–1 | 1–1 | 0–1 | 1–0 | 3–3 | 4–0 | 2–0 | 2–0 | 0–0 | 3–1 |
| Rio Grande Valley Toros (RGV) | STL | SAC | COS | SEA | POR | OCO | RNO | FRS | SAN | SPR | LAG | SLC | POR | OKC | PHX | STL | TUL | LVL | SPR | COS | LVL | SAC | OKC | LAG | OCO | SAN | PHX | SLC | COS | SEA | RNO | FRS | TUL | SAN |
| Rio Grande Valley Toros (RGV) | 1–1 | 2–2 | 1–2 | 2–3 | 2–3 | 2–0 | 0–0 | 2–2 | 0–0 | 0–0 | 1–1 | 0–2 | 0–1 | 1–3 | 0–0 | 0–0 | 1–1 | 2–0 | 0–0 | 1–0 | 0–1 | 1–2 | 2–4 | 1–1 | 2–0 | 1–3 | 0–1 | 2–1 | 1–1 | 3–0 | 0–4 | 2–1 | 2–1 | 1–1 |
| Richmond Kickers (RIC) | BST | IND | NCA | NYR | LOU | TOR | BST | TBR | CLT | PGH | CHS | PEN | CIN | CLT | NCA | PEN | NYR | ATL | CHS | PGH | BST | TOR | OTT | PEN | LOU | NSH | IND | CLT | OTT | TBR | CIN | NCA | NSH | ATL |
| Richmond Kickers (RIC) | 1–4 | 0–1 | 2–1 | 1–1 | 1–2 | 2–1 | 1–3 | 1–0 | 1–3 | 1–2 | 2–0 | 1–2 | 0–4 | 1–1 | 1–3 | 2–1 | 1–5 | 1–1 | 0–3 | 0–3 | 0–3 | 0–1 | 0–2 | 3–2 | 0–6 | 0–4 | 1–1 | 1–2 | 0–2 | 0–3 | 1–4 | 2–3 | 0–3 | 2–3 |
| Sacramento Republic (SAC) | SAN | OCO | RGV | SEA | LVL | COS | TUL | POR | SEA | RNO | PHX | SLC | OCO | PHX | FRS | SAN | STL | FRS | SLC | SPR | COS | OKC | FRS | RGV | STL | LAG | RNO | SEA | TUL | OKC | POR | SPR | LAG | LVL |
| Sacramento Republic (SAC) | 2–1 | 1–0 | 2–2 | 1–0 | 1–1 | 2–1 | 1–1 | 0–2 | 2–1 | 2–3 | 3–1 | 0–1 | 1–0 | 0–0 | 1–0 | 0–1 | 2–2 | 0–2 | 0–0 | 3–1 | 1–0 | 1–1 | 1–0 | 2–1 | 1–2 | 1–4 | 2–1 | 3–0 | 4–1 | 0–0 | 1–0 | 3–1 | 2–1 | 1–0 |
| San Antonio FC (SAN) | SAC | STL | LAG | SPR | OCO | FRS | LVL | FRS | RGV | TUL | RNO | POR | SAC | RNO | COS | OKC | OCO | SLC | COS | OKC | LAG | SEA | POR | PHX | SPR | RGV | SLC | PHX | TUL | SPR | STL | SEA | LVL | RGV |
| San Antonio FC (SAN) | 1–2 | 2–1 | 0–0 | 1–1 | 0–3 | 0–0 | 3–1 | 2–1 | 0–0 | 1–1 | 1–2 | 2–1 | 1–0 | 0–2 | 1–1 | 1–1 | 0–3 | 4–2 | 1–0 | 2–1 | 2–1 | 2–3 | 1–2 | 0–4 | 1–2 | 3–1 | 2–1 | 3–2 | 1–2 | 0–2 | 0–2 | 3–1 | 3–1 | 1–1 |
| Saint Louis FC (STL) | RGV | SAN | COS | FRS | LAG | OKC | SPR | POR | LAG | OCO | COS | PHX | SPR | TUL | SLC | SAC | RGV | LVL | OCO | RNO | SEA | LVL | SAC | FRS | TUL | SEA | POR | RNO | SLC | SPR | SAN | PHX | TUL | OKC |
| Saint Louis FC (STL) | 1–1 | 1–2 | 1–0 | 1–1 | 1–0 | 1–0 | 1–1 | 0–0 | 3–6 | 1–1 | 0–3 | 1–3 | 2–0 | 3–0 | 0–1 | 2–2 | 0–0 | 0–1 | 2–2 | 2–1 | 2–0 | 4–1 | 2–1 | 0–1 | 3–2 | 1–1 | 0–1 | 1–0 | 1–1 | 4–3 | 2–0 | 0–2 | 1–0 | 0–0 |
| Seattle Sounders FC 2 (SEA) | POR | SPR | FRS | SAC | SLC | RGV | COS | SAC | POR | RNO | FRS | OKC | LVL | LAG | SPR | RNO | SLC | PHX | LVL | STL | SAN | POR | OKC | STL | OCO | TUL | SAC | PHX | RGV | SAN | LAG | OCO | COS | TUL |
| Seattle Sounders FC 2 (SEA) | 2–1 | 2–4 | 0–1 | 0–1 | 1–3 | 3–2 | 0–0 | 1–2 | 0–1 | 1–1 | 0–4 | 2–1 | 1–4 | 3–5 | 0–2 | 1–2 | 0–2 | 0–1 | 3–0 | 0–2 | 3–2 | 1–4 | 0–3 | 1–1 | 1–1 | 4–4 | 0–3 | 0–1 | 0–3 | 1–3 | 2–2 | 1–2 | 2–2 | 4–1 |
| Swope Park Rangers (SPR) | RNO | SEA | LVL | COS | SAN | PHX | STL | OKC | SLC | RGV | PHX | STL | COS | SLC | FRS | LVL | SEA | SAC | POR | OCO | RGV | LAG | OCO | POR | RNO | SAN | TUL | OKC | FRS | STL | SAN | TUL | SAC | LAG |
| Swope Park Rangers (SPR) | 4–3 | 4–2 | 1–2 | 1–0 | 1–1 | 2–2 | 1–1 | 1–0 | 1–4 | 0–0 | 1–0 | 0–2 | 1–0 | 3–2 | 1–4 | 3–2 | 2–0 | 1–3 | 1–2 | 0–4 | 0–0 | 1–1 | 1–2 | 0–2 | 3–3 | 2–1 | 2–1 | 1–0 | 1–0 | 3–4 | 2–0 | 1–1 | 1–3 | 5–1 |
| Tampa Bay Rowdies (TBR) | NCA | BST | LOU | OTT | NYR | SLC | CHS | PEN | RIC | PGH | TOR | ATL | NSH | PEN | CLT | TOR | LOU | CIN | IND | NYR | OTT | CHS | NCA | PGH | CIN | NCA | CHS | ATL | NSH | RIC | IND | ATL | CLT | BST |
| Tampa Bay Rowdies (TBR) | 3–1 | 2–0 | 0–1 | 5–0 | 0–4 | 2–0 | 0–1 | 0–3 | 0–1 | 2–2 | 4–2 | 0–0 | 1–1 | 1–2 | 2–2 | 3–1 | 1–2 | 0–2 | 3–1 | 2–2 | 0–2 | 0–0 | 0–2 | 1–1 | 1–2 | 3–0 | 0–1 | 1–0 | 2–1 | 3–0 | 0–2 | 1–1 | 1–2 | 0–1 |
| Toronto FC II (TOR) | NYR | CLT | PGH | NCA | RIC | NYR | PGH | PEN | ATL | CLT | TBR | OTT | PEN | IND | CIN | CHS | TBR | NCA | NSH | PGH | RIC | BST | IND | LOU | ATL | OTT | NYR | CIN | BST | OTT | CHS | LOU | NSH | PEN |
| Toronto FC II (TOR) | 1–2 | 0–2 | 0–4 | 0–0 | 1–2 | 0–0 | 1–2 | 0–1 | 4–5 | 1–2 | 2–4 | 0–3 | 2–3 | 1–3 | 3–3 | 0–4 | 1–3 | 1–3 | 2–0 | 0–1 | 1–0 | 0–2 | 2–3 | 4–1 | 1–2 | 3–4 | 3–3 | 3–4 | 0–4 | 0–1 | 2–1 | 1–3 | 2–2 | 0–0 |
| Tulsa Roughnecks (TUL) | OKC | SLC | OCO | POR | FRS | SAC | LVL | RNO | PHX | SAN | OKC | LAG | STL | PHX | OCO | LAG | LVL | RGV | COS | FRE | OKC | COS | SLC | STL | SPR | SEA | POR | SAN | SAC | SPR | RNO | RGV | STL | SEA |
| Tulsa Roughnecks (TUL) | 0–1 | 2–3 | 0–5 | 0–0 | 2–2 | 1–1 | 1–1 | 1–1 | 1–5 | 1–1 | 1–1 | 0–1 | 0–3 | 0–3 | 1–6 | 2–0 | 2–2 | 1–1 | 2–4 | 1–1 | 0–3 | 2–1 | 2–3 | 2–3 | 1–2 | 4–4 | 0–4 | 2–1 | 1–4 | 1–1 | 0–2 | 1–2 | 0–1 | 1–4 |

== Playoffs ==
First round
October 20 – Nippert Stadium
#1 FC Cincinnati (p) | 1 (6)
#8 Nashville SC | 1 (5)
October 20 – MUSC Health Stadium
#4 Charleston Battery | 0
#5 New York Red Bulls II | 1
October 20 – Highmark Stadium
#3 Pittsburgh Riverhounds SC | 2 (7)
#6 Bethlehem Steel FC (p) | 2 (8)
October 20 – Louisville Slugger Field
#2 Louisville City FC | 4
#7 Indy Eleven | 1
October 20 – Championship Soccer Stadium
#1 Orange County SC | 4
#8 Saint Louis FC | 0
October 20 – Zions Bank Stadium
#4 Real Monarchs | 0
#5 Reno 1868 FC | 1
October 19 – PRFC Soccer Complex
#3 Phoenix Rising FC | 3
#6 Portland Timbers 2 | 0
October 20 – Papa Murphy's Park
#2 Sacramento Republic FC | 1
#7 Swope Park Rangers | 2

Conference Semifinals
October 27 – Nippert Stadium
#1 FC Cincinnati | 0
#5 New York Red Bulls II | 1
October 27 – Louisville Slugger Field
#6 Bethlehem Steel FC | 0
#2 Louisville City FC | 2
October 27 – Championship Soccer Stadium
#1 Orange County SC | 1
#5 Reno 1868 FC | 0
October 26 – PRFC Soccer Complex
#3 Phoenix Rising FC | 4
#7 Swope Park Rangers | 2

Conference finals
November 2 – Louisville Slugger Field
#5 New York Red Bulls II | 1
#2 Louisville City FC | 5
November 3 – Championship Soccer Stadium
#1 Orange County SC | 1
#3 Phoenix Rising FC | 2

USL championship
November 8 – Lynn Stadium (ESPN2)
#2 Louisville City FC | 1
#3 Phoenix Rising FC | 0

=== Eastern Conference ===
| October 20, 2018 QF | FC Cincinnati | 1–1 (a.e.t.) (6–5 p) | Nashville SC | Cincinnati, Ohio |
| 4:00 p.m. EDT | Bone 95'; Smith (yellow card) 104'; Ledesma (yellow card) 111' | Report | Davis (yellow card) 110'; Bourgeois 115'; Tyrpak (yellow card) 116' | Stadium: Nippert Stadium; Attendance: 20,217; Referee: Farhad Dadkho |
| | Penalties |
| | Adi (penalty scored); McLaughlin (penalty scored); Smith (penalty scored); Hoyte (penalty scored); Lasso (penalty scored); Walker (penalty scored) | | (penalty scored) Doyle; (penalty scored) Allen; (penalty scored) Winn; (penalty scored) LaGrassa; (penalty scored) Tyrpak; (penalty missed) Davis |

| October 20, 2018 QF | Charleston Battery | 0–1 | New York Red Bulls II | Charleston, South Carolina |
| 7:00 PM EDT | Bolt (yellow card) 16' | Report | Barlow 21'; Stroud (yellow card) 66' | Stadium: MUSC Health Stadium; Attendance: 1,687; Referee: Rosendo Mendoza |

| October 20, 2018 QF | Pittsburgh Riverhounds SC | 2–2 (a.e.t.) (7–8 p) | Bethlehem Steel FC | Pittsburgh, Pennsylvania |
| 7:00 PM EDT | Zemanski 25'; Dover (yellow card) 86'; Roberts 105' (yellow card) 109'; Forbes (yellow card) 113'; Holland (red card) 119' | Report | Moumbagna (yellow card) 45'; Ngalina 70'; Chambers 109'; Nanco (yellow card) 111' | Stadium: Highmark Stadium; Attendance: 5,189; Referee: Michael Radchuk |
| | Penalties |
| | Kerr (penalty scored); Forbes (penalty scored); Banjo (penalty scored); Greenspan (penalty scored); François (penalty scored); Vancaeyezeele (penalty scored); Dabo (penalty scored); Lee (penalty missed) | | (penalty scored) Chambers; (penalty scored) Nanco; (penalty scored) Holness; (penalty scored) Moar; (penalty scored) Skundrich; (penalty scored) Mahoney; (penalty scored) Real; (penalty scored) Mbaizo |

| October 20, 2018 QF | Louisville City FC | 4–1 | Indy Eleven | Louisville, Kentucky |
| 7:30 p.m. EDT | McCabe 29', 48' (yellow card) 66'; Ilić 42'; Lancaster 73' | Report | Mitchell (yellow card) 46'; Saad 67'; Ouimette (yellow card) 72' | Stadium: Louisville Slugger Field; Attendance: 6,763; Referee: Mark Allatin |

| October 27, 2018 SF | FC Cincinnati | 0–1 | New York Red Bulls II | Cincinnati, Ohio |
| 4:00 p.m. EDT | Adi (yellow card) 41' | Report | Moreno 12' (yellow card) 72' | Stadium: Nippert Stadium; Attendance: 16,617; Referee: Tim Ford |

| October 27, 2018 SF | Louisville City FC | 2–0 | Bethlehem Steel FC | Louisville, Kentucky |
| 7:30 p.m. EDT | Ownby 34', 59' (yellow card) 79'; Smith (yellow card) 64' | Report | Moar (yellow card) 57'; Mbaizo (yellow card) 83'; Ofeimu (yellow card) 86' | Stadium: Louisville Slugger Field; Attendance: 6,881; Referee: Farhad Dadkho |

| November 2, 2018 F | Louisville City FC | 5–1 | New York Red Bulls II | Louisville, Kentucky |
| 7:30 p.m. EDT | Ilić 23' (pen.), (yellow card) 40'; Spencer 32'; Davis (yellow card) 61'; Craig (yellow card) 65'; Ownby (yellow card) 69', (goal) 81'; Williams 73', 75'; McCabe (yellow card) 80' | Report | Ndam (yellow card) 22'; Tinari (yellow card) 44'; Barlow 60' | Stadium: Louisville Slugger Field; Attendance: 10,059; Referee: Ramy Touchan |

=== Western Conference ===
| October 19, 2018 QF | Phoenix Rising FC | 3–0 | Portland Timbers 2 | Tempe, Arizona |
| 7:30 p.m. MST | Drogba 28'; Johnson 62'; Asante 90' | Report | Zambrano (yellow card) 40'; Hanson (yellow card) 84'; Diz Pe (red card) 90+5' | Stadium: Phoenix Rising FC Soccer Complex; Attendance: 7,511; Referee: Rubiel Vazquez |

| October 20, 2018 QF | Real Monarchs | 0–1 | Reno 1868 FC | Herriman, Utah |
| 3:00 PM MDT | Velásquez (yellow card) 45+4' | Report | Brown 90+2' | Stadium: Zions Bank Stadium; Attendance: 3,000; Referee: Ismir Pekmic |

| October 20, 2018 QF | Orange County SC | 4–0 | Saint Louis FC | Irvine, California |
| 7:00 PM PDT | Seaton 11', 29', 64' (yellow card) 21'; Quinn (yellow card) 47'; Bjurman 66' | Report | Walls (red card) 21'; Hertzog (yellow card) 88' | Stadium: Championship Soccer Stadium; Attendance: 3,360; Referee: Ramy Touchan |

| October 20, 2018 QF | Sacramento Republic FC | 1–2 | Swope Park Rangers | Sacramento, California |
| 7:30 PM PDT | Bijev 16'; Matjašič (yellow card) 38'; Hord (yellow card) 68' | Report | Kuzain 27'; Barry 31'; Akhmatov (yellow card) 58' | Stadium: Papa Murphy's Park; Attendance: 11,569; Referee: Joseph Dickerson |

| October 26, 2018 SF | Phoenix Rising FC | 4–2 | Swope Park Rangers | Tempe, Arizona |
| 7:30 p.m. MST | Johnson 22'; Drogba (yellow card) 29' (goal) 90+4'; Cortez 36'; Lambert 48' | Report | Blackwood 26'; Barry 33'; Akhmatov (yellow card) 49' | Stadium: Phoenix Rising FC Soccer Complex; Attendance: 7,707; Referee: Guido Gonzales Jr. |

| October 27, 2018 SF | Orange County SC | 1–0 | Reno 1868 FC | Irvine, California |
| 7:00 PM PDT | Alston (yellow card) 21'; Quinn 29'; Duke (yellow card) 90+2' | Report | Richards (yellow card) 12'; Brown (yellow card) 41'; Hoppenot (yellow card) 45+2' | Stadium: Championship Soccer Stadium; Attendance: 4,021; Referee: Victor Rivas |

| November 3, 2018 F | Orange County SC | 1–2 | Phoenix Rising FC | Irvine, California |
| 7:00 p.m. PDT | Chaplow (yellow card) 47'; Hashimoto 82' | Report | Cortez 2'; Drogba 73'; Forbes (yellow card) 90+7' | Stadium: Championship Soccer Stadium; Attendance: 5,189; Referee: Tim Ford |

=== USL Championship ===
| November 8, 2018 Final | Louisville City FC | 1–0 | Phoenix Rising FC | Louisville, Kentucky |
| 8:00 PM EST | Smith (yellow card) 45'; Spencer 62', (yellow card) 90+1'; Ranjitsingh (yellow card) 90+3' | Report | Farrell (yellow card) 39'; Drogba (yellow card) 73'; Lambert (yellow card) 85' | Stadium: Lynn Stadium; Attendance: 7,025; Referee: Joseph Dickerson |

Championship Game MVP: (United States) Luke Spencer (LOU)

== Attendance ==
=== Average home attendances ===
Ranked from highest to lowest average attendance.

| Team | GP | Total | High | Low | Average |
|---|---|---|---|---|---|
| FC Cincinnati | 17 | 437,197 | 31,478 | 22,407 | 25,717 |
| Sacramento Republic FC | 17 | 192,293 | 11,569 | 9,757 | 11,311 |
| Indy Eleven | 17 | 172,776 | 17,535 | 8,079 | 10,163 |
| Nashville SC | 17 | 162,640 | 18,922 | 7,487 | 9,561 |
| Louisville City FC | 17 | 134,153 | 9,684 | 6,009 | 7,891 |
| Las Vegas Lights FC | 17 | 123,529 | 9,019 | 6,810 | 7,256 |
| San Antonio FC | 17 | 117,969 | 7,946 | 6,090 | 6,939 |
| Phoenix Rising FC | 17 | 108,475 | 7,381 | 5,017 | 6,381 |
| Tampa Bay Rowdies | 17 | 94,399 | 7,368 | 5,059 | 5,553 |
| Reno 1868 FC | 17 | 86,128 | 7,103 | 3,224 | 5,066 |
| Fresno FC | 17 | 82,810 | 7,769 | 3,718 | 4,871 |
| Ottawa Fury FC | 17 | 80,778 | 8,084 | 2,781 | 4,752 |
| North Carolina FC | 17 | 80,414 | 9,505 | 3,169 | 4,730 |
| Rio Grande Valley FC | 17 | 79,049 | 7,846 | 4,102 | 4,650 |
| Oklahoma City Energy FC | 17 | 73,071 | 6,757 | 2,574 | 4,298 |
| Richmond Kickers | 17 | 67,594 | 5,860 | 1,519 | 3,976 |
| Saint Louis FC | 17 | 72,615 | 6,019 | 3,683 | 4,271 |
| Seattle Sounders FC 2 | 17 | 57,285 | 6,049 | 2,090 | 3,370 |
| Colorado Springs Switchbacks FC | 17 | 67,674 | 5,000 | 2,534 | 3,295 |
| Orange County SC | 17 | 52,618 | 3,742 | 2,236 | 3,095 |
| Tulsa Roughnecks FC | 17 | 52,099 | 5,203 | 2,311 | 3,065 |
| Charleston Battery | 17 | 48,824 | 4,659 | 2,597 | 2,872 |
| Atlanta United 2 | 17 | 44,158 | 5,615 | 1,923 | 2,598 |
| Pittsburgh Riverhounds | 18^{†} | 43,212 | 3,123 | 1,823 | 2,401 |
| Penn FC | 17 | 36,498 | 2,909 | 852 | 2,147 |
| Portland Timbers 2 | 17 | 34,256 | 5,857 | 1,548 | 2,015 |
| Bethlehem Steel FC | 17 | 39,898 | 3,284 | 1,418 | 2,347 |
| Real Monarchs | 17 | 29,432 | 4,065 | 1,089 | 1,731 |
| Charlotte Independence | 18^{†} | 29,858 | 3,312 | 982 | 1,659 |
| LA Galaxy II | 17 | 17,818 | 1,236 | 858 | 1,048 |
| Toronto FC II | 15^{†} | 12,143 | 4,100 | 50 | 810 |
| Swope Park Rangers | 17 | 14,978 | 1,134 | 737 | 881 |
| New York Red Bulls II | 17 | 10,946 | 1,592 | 498 | 812 |
| Total | 561 | 2,756,759 | 31,478 | 50 | 4,923 |

^{†} Two Toronto FC II home matches were moved to Highmark Stadium and Sportsplex at Matthews due to unplayable field conditions.

Updated to games of October 14, 2018.
Sources: USL Soccer Stadium Digest

== Statistical leaders ==
=== Top scorers ===
| Rank | Player | Nation | Club | Goals |
|---|---|---|---|---|
| 1 | Cameron Lancaster | ENG | Louisville City FC | 25 |
| 2 | Thomas Enevoldsen | DEN | Orange County SC | 20 |
| 2 | Daniel Rios | MEX | North Carolina FC | 20 |
| 4 | Hadji Barry | GUI | Swope Park Rangers | 17 |
| 4 | Chris Cortez | USA | Phoenix Rising FC | 17 |
| 4 | Cameron Iwasa | USA | Sacramento Republic | 17 |
| 7 | Brian Brown | JAM | Reno 1868 FC | 16 |
| 7 | Emmanuel Ledesma | ARG | FC Cincinnati | 16 |
| 9 | Neco Brett | JAM | Pittsburgh Riverhounds | 15 |
| 9 | Ataulla Guerra | TRI | Charleston Battery | 15 |

=== Top assists ===
| Rank | Player | Nation | Club | Assists |
|---|---|---|---|---|
| 1 | Emmanuel Ledesma | ARG | FC Cincinnati | 16 |
| 2 | Aodhan Quinn | USA | Orange County SC | 14 |
| 3 | Kyle Bekker | CAN | North Carolina FC | 13 |
| 3 | Antoine Hoppenot | FRA | Reno 1868 FC | 13 |
| 5 | Jared Stroud | USA | New York Red Bulls II | 11 |
| 6 | Ilija Ilić | SER | Louisville City FC | 10 |
| 6 | Oscar Jimenez | USA | Louisville City FC | 10 |
| 8 | José Barril | ESP | OKC Energy FC | 9 |
| 8 | Maikel Chang | CUB | Real Monarchs | 9 |
| 8 | Thomas Enevoldsen | DEN | Orange County SC | 9 |

=== Shutouts ===
| Rank | Player | Nation | Club | Shutouts |
|---|---|---|---|---|
| 1 | Maxime Crépeau | CAN | Ottawa Fury FC | 15 |
| 2 | Matt Pickens | USA | Nashville SC | 14 |
| 3 | Josh Cohen | USA | Sacramento Republic | 12 |
| 3 | Joe Kuzminsky | USA | Charleston Battery | 12 |
| 3 | Daniel Lynd | USA | Pittsburgh Riverhounds | 12 |
| 3 | Carl Woszczynski | USA | Phoenix Rising FC | 12 |
| 7 | Greg Ranjitsingh | TRI | Louisville City FC | 11 |
| 7 | Owain Fôn Williams | WAL | Indy Eleven | 11 |
| 9 | Evan Newton | USA | FC Cincinnati | 9 |
| 10 | Andre Rawls | USA | Orange County SC | 8 |

=== Hat-tricks ===
| Player | Nation | Club | Against | Result | Date |
|---|---|---|---|---|---|
| Chris Cortez | USA | Phoenix Rising FC | OKC Energy FC | 4–1 | March 24 |
| Thomas Enevoldsen | DEN | Orange County SC | Tulsa Roughnecks FC | 5–0 | March 31 |
| Efrain Alvarez | MEX | LA Galaxy II | Saint Louis FC | 6–3 | May 9 |
| Ethan Zubak | USA | LA Galaxy II | Saint Louis FC | 6–3 | May 9 |
| Foster Langsdorf | USA | Portland Timbers 2 | LA Galaxy II | 7–3 | May 18 |
| Ethan Zubak | USA | LA Galaxy II | Las Vegas Lights | 7–2 | May 26 |
| Adonijah Reid | CAN | Ottawa Fury FC | New York Red Bulls II | 3–0 | June 24 |
| Raúl Mendiola | MEX | Las Vegas Lights FC | OKC Energy FC | 4–6 | July 11 |
| Jared Stroud | USA | New York Red Bulls II | Richmond Kickers | 5–1 | July 13 |
| Cameron Lancaster | ENG | Louisville City FC | New York Red Bulls II | 6–4 | August 10 |
| Solomon Asante | GHA | Phoenix Rising FC | Orange County SC | 3–4 | August 11 |
| Tom Barlow | USA | New York Red Bulls II | Charleston Battery | 4–4 | August 25 |
| Sebastián Guenzatti | URU | Tampa Bay Rowdies | North Carolina FC | 3–0 | September 1 |
| Jesús Ferreira | USA | Tulsa Roughnecks | Seattle Sounders FC 2 | 4–4 | September 5 |
| Tsubasa Endoh | JPN | Toronto FC II | FC Cincinnati | 3–4 | September 16 |
| Donovan Ewolo | CMR | North Carolina FC | Atlanta United 2 | 6–1 | September 21 |
| Efrain Alvarez | MEX | LA Galaxy II | Real Monarchs SLC | 6–1 | September 22 |
| Michael Seaton | JAM | Orange County SC | Saint Louis FC | 4–0 | October 20 (Playoffs) |

Scored four goals.

== League awards ==
=== Individual awards ===
- Most Valuable Player: (Argentina) Emmanuel Ledesma (CIN)
- Defender of the Year: (United States) Forrest Lasso (CIN)
- Young Player of the Year: (Mexico) Efrain Alvarez (LAG)
- Goalkeeper of the Year: (Canada) Maxime Crépeau (OTT)
- Coach of the Year: (South Africa) Alan Koch (CIN)
- Golden Boot: (England) Cameron Lancaster (LOU)
- Assists Champion: (Argentina) Emmanuel Ledesma (CIN)
- Golden Glove: (United States) Evan Newton (CIN)

=== All-League teams ===
First Team

F: (Denmark) Thomas Enevoldsen (OCO), (England) Cameron Lancaster (LOU), (Mexico) Daniel Rios (NCA)
M: (Cameroon) Tah Anunga (CHS), (Ghana) Solomon Asante (PHX), (Argentina) Emmanuel Ledesma (CIN), (United States) Aodhan Quinn (OCO)
D: (England) Paco Craig (LOU), (United States) Joseph Greenspan (PIT), (United States) Forrest Lasso (CIN)
G: (Canada) Maxime Crépeau (OTT)

Second Team

F: (Guinea) Hadji Barry (SPR), (Trinidad and Tobago) Ataulla Guerra (CHS), (United States) Cameron Iwasa (SAC)
M: (United States) Kyle Bekker (NCA), (United States) Corben Bone (CIN), (Jamaica) Kenardo Forbes (PIT), (South Africa) Lebo Moloto (NSH)
D: (Spain) Ayoze (IND), (United States) Darnell King (SAN), (Haiti) Denso Ulysse (SEA)
G: (United States) Josh Cohen (SAC)

| Month | USL Player of the Month | | | USL Coach of the Month | | References |
| Month | Player | Club | Position | Player | Club | References |
|---|---|---|---|---|---|---|
| March | (Grenada) Kharlton Belmar | Swope Park Rangers | Forward | (Canada) Isidro Sánchez | Las Vegas Lights FC | |
| April | (England) Cameron Lancaster | Louisville City FC | Forward | (Republic of Ireland) James O'Connor | Louisville City FC | |
| May | (Canada) Maxime Crépeau | Ottawa Fury FC | Goalkeeper | (Serbia) Nikola Popovic | Ottawa Fury FC | |
| June | (Argentina) Emmanuel Ledesma | FC Cincinnati | Midfielder | (United States) Rick Schantz | Phoenix Rising FC | |
| July | (Trinidad and Tobago) Ataulla Guerra | Charleston Battery | Forward | (United States) Mike Anhaeuser | Charleston Battery | |
| August | (England) Cameron Lancaster | Louisville City FC | Forward | (United States) Brendan Burke | Bethlehem Steel FC | |
| September | (Argentina) Emmanuel Ledesma | FC Cincinnati | Midfielder | (South Africa) Alan Koch | FC Cincinnati | |
| October | (England) Cameron Lancaster | Louisville City FC | Forward | (United States) John Wolyniec | New York Red Bulls II | |

USL Player of the Week
| Week | Player | Club | Position | Reason |
|---|---|---|---|---|
| 1 | (Grenada) Kharlton Belmar | Swope Park Rangers | Forward | 2G 2A GWG |
| 2 | (United States) Chris Cortez | Phoenix Rising FC | Forward | Hat Trick vs OKC Energy |
| 3 | (Denmark) Thomas Enevoldsen | Orange County SC | Forward | Hat Trick vs Tulsa |
| 4 | (Jamaica) Neco Brett | Pittsburgh Riverhounds | Forward | Hat Trick vs Toronto FC II |
| 5 | (Lebanon) Soony Saad | Indy Eleven | Midfielder | 2G vs Nashville |
| 6 | (North Macedonia) Danny Musovski | Reno 1868 FC | Forward | GWG vs Portland |
| 7 | (Canada) Kyle Bekker | North Carolina FC | Midfielder | 1G 2A |
| 8 | (United States) Tom Heinemann | Penn FC | Forward | 2G |
| 9 | (Mexico) Efrain Alvarez | LA Galaxy II | Midfielder | Hat Trick vs St. Louis |
| 10 | (Argentina) Emmanuel Ledesma | FC Cincinnati | Midfielder | 1G 3A |
| 11 | (United States) Ethan Zubak | LA Galaxy II | Forward | 4G vs Las Vegas |
| 12 | (United States) Brandon Allen | Nashville SC | Forward | 2G 1A |
| 13 | (United States) Joey Calistri | Saint Louis FC | Midfielder | 2G 1A |
| 14 | (Jamaica) Jason Johnson | Phoenix Rising FC | Forward | 3G |
| 15 | (Canada) Adonijah Reid | Ottawa Fury FC | Forward | Hat Trick vs NY Red Bulls II |
| 16 | (United States) Carl Woszczynski | Phoenix Rising FC | Goalkeeper | 7-Save SO |
| 17 | (Jamaica) Brian Brown | Reno 1868 FC | Forward | 3G |
| 18 | (United States) Cameron Iwasa | Sacramento Republic | Forward | 2G 1A |
| 19 | (Jamaica) Junior Flemmings | Tampa Bay Rowdies | Midfielder | 1G 2A |
| 20 | (Guatemala) Nico Rittmeyer | Charleston Battery | Midfielder | 2G |
| 21 | (Jamaica) Neco Brett | Pittsburgh Riverhounds | Forward | 3G |
| 22 | (England) Cameron Lancaster | Louisville City FC | Forward | Hat Trick vs NY Red Bulls II |
| 23 | (Jamaica) Michael Seaton | Orange County SC | Forward | 2G 1A |
| 24 | (United States) Tom Barlow | New York Red Bulls II | Forward | Hat Trick vs Charleston |
| 25 | (Uruguay) Sebastián Guenzatti | Tampa Bay Rowdies | Forward | Hat Trick vs North Carolina |
| 26 | (United States) Jesús Ferreira | Tulsa Roughnecks | Forward | Hat Trick vs Seattle |
| 27 | (Japan) Tsubasa Endoh | Toronto FC II | Midfielder | Hat Trick vs Cincinnati |
| 28 | (Cameroon) Donovan Ewolo | North Carolina FC | Forward | 4G vs Atlanta |
| 29 | (Canada) Kyle Bekker | North Carolina FC | Midfielder | 2G 1A |
| 30 | (Jamaica) Romario Williams | Atlanta United 2 | Forward | 2G |
| 31 | (England) Cameron Lancaster | Louisville City FC | Forward | 3G |
