= Nikola Popović =

Nikola Popović may refer to:

- Nikola Popović (footballer) (born 1994), Serbian footballer
- Nikola Popović (football coach) (born 1978), Portuguese/Serbian football coach
- Nikola Popović (basketball) (born 1997), Serbian basketball player
- Nikola Popović (actor) (1907–1967), Serbian/Yugoslavian actor
