= Marcel Kandziora =

German footballer

Personal information
- Date of birth: 4 February 1990 (age 36)
- Place of birth: Münster, West Germany
- Height: 1.81 m (5 ft 11 1/2 in)
- Position: Defensive midfielder

Youth career
- 1996–2004: TuS Altenberge
- 2004–2009: Borussia Dortmund

Senior career*
Years	Team	Apps	(Gls)
2009–2011	Borussia Dortmund II	46	(2)
2011–2013	SV Sandhausen	52	(3)
2013–2014	FSV Frankfurt	11	(0)
2014–2016	VfL Osnabrück	52	(6)
2017–2018	North Carolina FC	33	(3)
- * Club domestic league appearances and goals as of 12:24, 15 October 2018 (UTC)

Marcel Kandziora (born 4 February 1990) is a German footballer.
