= Southern Derby =

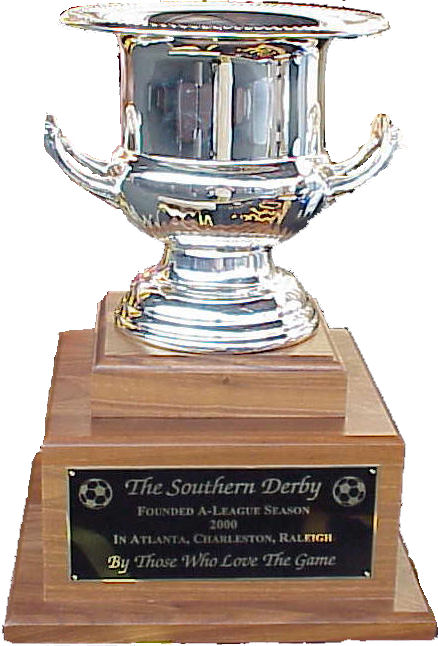
- Old Southern Derby Cup
- Founded: 2000
- Region: Southeast
- Teams: 2
- Current champions: Charleston Battery
- Most championships: Charleston Battery (10 titles)

The Southern Derby is a fan-based U.S. professional soccer cup competition between USL Championship (USLC) teams based in the South-Atlantic region of the United States (North Carolina, South Carolina, and Georgia). It was founded in 2000. The Southern Derby trophy is currently held by the Charleston Battery.

The Southern Derby was created by the fans of the teams involved to promote a friendly competition and rivalry along the clubs involved and encourage fans to travel to away matches. The Southern Derby is perhaps the first cup competition of its kind in American professional soccer. It is common in nature with other fan cup competitions which originated in the United Soccer Leagues such as the Cascadia Cup, the James River Cup, and the Voyageurs Cup. It is also similar to Major League Soccer trophy competitions such as the Atlantic Cup, the Brimstone Cup, the Lamar Hunt Pioneer Cup, the Rocky Mountain Cup, and the Texas Derby.

== Southern Derby Commemorative Cup ==
The Southern Derby Commemorative Cup is the trophy awarded annually to the winner of the Southern Derby. The trophy consists of a wooden base attached to a silver-plated, two-handled cup. The inscription on the base of the trophy reads The Southern Derby: Founded A-League Season 2000 in Atlanta, Charleston, & Raleigh by those who love the Game.

The cup was purchased through funds raised by the supporters club of the inaugural three clubs involved in the competition. The Fans own Southern Derby Commemorative Cup which is loaned each year to the holders of the Southern Derby.

== Current clubs ==
- Charleston Battery
- North Carolina FC

== History ==
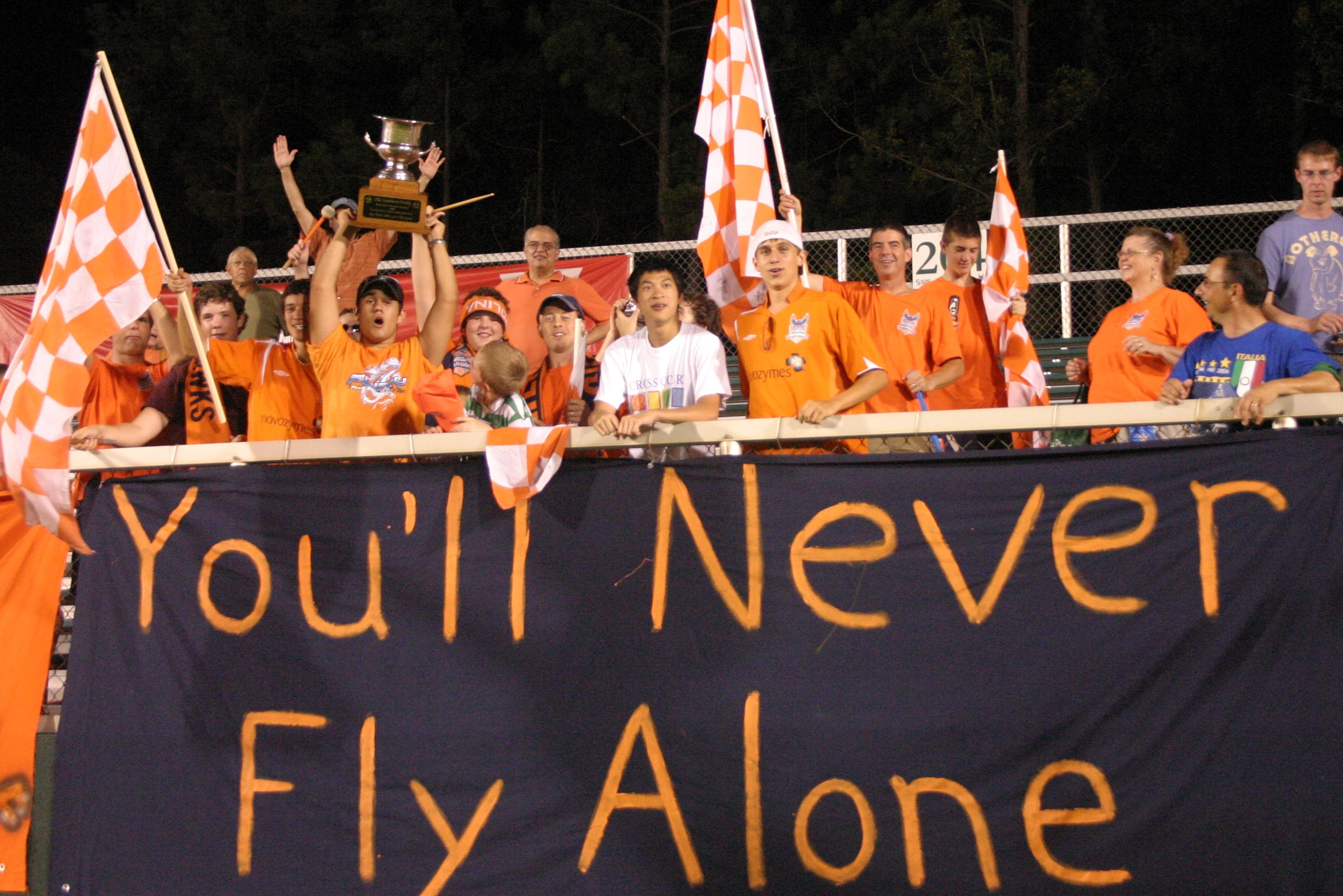
RailHawks fans celebrate their team's 2007 Southern Derby Championship on August 17, 2007, at SAS Soccer Park, now WakeMed Soccer Park

The first edition of the Southern Derby was contested in 2000 between the A-League (1995-2004) Charleston Battery, the Atlanta Silverbacks, and the Raleigh Capital Express with Raleigh winning the inaugural competition.

The Raleigh Capital Express folded before the 2001 season and the Charlotte Eagles were invited to replace Raleigh in the cup competition. Charlotte won the trophy in their first year in the contest. The Eagles would continue to compete in the contest in 2002 and 2003 with Atlanta and Charleston winning the competition those years, respectively.

At the end of the 2003 season, Charlotte moved to the USL Second Division leaving the Southern Derby to be played between only Charleston and Atlanta. The Silverbacks won the title outright in 2004 and 2006 and split the title with Charleston in 2005.

In 2007, the Carolina RailHawks (based in Cary, North Carolina, and now known as North Carolina FC) joined the USL First Division and was invited to take up Raleigh's original spot in the competition. Carolina went undefeated in their 2007 Southern Derby campaign capturing the cup in their inaugural season. The RailHawks successfully defended their title in 2008 and through two seasons had beaten Charleston a remarkable 6 times in 6 games (4 Southern Derby fixtures).

With the Silverbacks taking a hiatus in 2009, the 2009 edition of the Southern Derby Cup was a home-and-away competition between the Charleston Battery and the Carolina RailHawks contested on May 9 and July 11. Both Charleston and Carolina shared honors in the 2009 Southern Derby Cup.

In 2010 with the Carolina RailHawks joining the NASL and Charleston dropping to USL2, the Carolina fans decided to allow the Charleston Battery to continue with the tradition of the Southern Derby Cup with the Charlotte Eagles as opposed to it sitting idle. Charleston won the Southern Derby Cup in 2010.

The 2011 Southern Derby featured both Charlotte and Charleston once again and added the Wilmington Hammerheads to the competition. The winner was decided on the last match of the Southern Derby Dates, which happened to be the Charleston vs. Charlotte match on Fox Soccer Channel. Charleston won the 2011 Southern Derby match.

With their return to the United Soccer League (now known as the USL Championship) in 2018, North Carolina FC (formerly the Carolina RailHawks) rejoined the competition alongside former rivals the Charleston Battery and newly minted cross-state opponents the Charlotte Independence.

2020 saw the Charlotte Independence supporter's group Jack's Militia opt-out of the Southern Derby. Due to Covid, the Charleston Battery and North Carolina FC played a "one and done" version of the contest. The Charleston Battery won the single match, 3–0.

In 2021, North Carolina FC self-relegated to USL League 1 leaving Charleston and Charlotte to contest for the Cup once again. With the emergence of the new Charlotte Independence supporters group, the Mecklenburg Reserves, the rivalry was once again back on. The winner of the 2021 Southern Derby Cup will be played over two legs, the first at Charleston Battery's home pitch, Patriots Point on July 23 and the second leg in Charlotte's home stadium, Memorial Stadium on October 16. The Charlotte Independence won their first Southern Derby in 2021, splitting the games with Charleston, but outscoring Charleston 5–3 on aggregate goals.

2022 saw Charlotte move to USL League One, leaving no teams in the immediate region for the Southern Derby. The Southern Derby Cup was dormant for the 2022 and 2023 season but with the announcement of North Carolina FC rejoining the USL Championship for the 2024 season, the Cup competition was revived.

== The Rules ==
Rules for the 2020 Southern Derby Cup were changed due to COVID-19. The single match between the Charleston Battery and North Carolina FC will be a one-and-done competition. In the case of a draw, the teams shall be declared co-champions and the Charleston Battery will retain physical control of the Cup as the 2019 champions.

- The system of play shall be the league system, with each team playing two matches (home/away) against each of the teams.
- The Matches composing the Southern Derby will normally be the last home and away matches of each team during the regular season unless otherwise negotiated by the members of the respective supporters club prior to the start of the season.
- Points will be awarded on the 3-1-0 systems. 3 points for a win, 1 point for a tie, and 0 points for a loss. Overtime wins are treated like regulation wins an awarded 3 points.
- The winner of the Southern Derby shall be the team having the greater number of points obtained in all the designated Derby matches.
- If two or more teams are equal on the basis of the above criteria, the tie-breaker shall be determined as follows:
  - Goal difference in all the Derby matches.
  - Greater number of goals scored in all Derby matches.
  - Greater number of points obtained in all Derby matches between the teams concerned.
  - Goal difference resulting from all Derby matches between the teams concerned.
  - Greater number of goals scored in all the Derby matches between the teams concerned.
  - Least amount of Yellow Cards.

== Southern Derby Winners ==
- 2000: Raleigh Capital Express
- 2001: Charlotte Eagles
- 2002: Atlanta Silverbacks
- 2003: Charleston Battery
- 2004: Atlanta Silverbacks
- 2005: Charleston Battery and Atlanta Silverbacks (co-champions)
- 2006: Atlanta Silverbacks
- 2007: Carolina RailHawks
- 2008: Carolina RailHawks
- 2009: Carolina RailHawks and Charleston Battery (co-champions)
- 2010: Charleston Battery
- 2011: Charleston Battery
- 2012: Charlotte Eagles
- 2013: Charlotte Eagles
- 2014: Wilmington Hammerheads
- 2015: Charleston Battery
- 2016: Charleston Battery
- 2017: Charleston Battery
- 2018: North Carolina FC
- 2019: Charleston Battery
- 2020: Charleston Battery
- 2021: Charlotte Independence
- 2022: Not Played
- 2023: Not Played
- 2024: Charleston Battery

== Current Results ==
=== Standings ===
Team	Pts	Pld	W	L	T	GF	GA	GD
Charleston Battery	4	2	1	0	1	5	2	+3
North Carolina FC	1	2	0	1	1	2	5	-3

=== Matches ===
March 9, 2024	Charleston Battery	0-0	North Carolina FC	Cary, North Carolina
7:00 PM EDT	Somersall (yellow card) 39'; Placias (yellow card) 87'	Report	LaCava (yellow card) 20'; Conway (yellow card) 84'; Torres (yellow card) 90+4'	Stadium: WakeMed; Attendance: 2,576; Referee: Jeremy Scheer

June 28, 2024	North Carolina FC	2-5	Charleston Battery	Charleston, South Carolina
7:30 PM EDT	Conway 27' (yellow card) 37'; Batista (yellow card) 42'; Armstrong (yellow card) 45+3' (yellow-red card) 50'; Brewer 45+6'; McGuire (yellow card) 90+1'	Report	Markanich (yellow card) 45+5' (goal) 80'; Myers 58' 90+2' 90+8' (pen.); Dossantos (yellow card) 84'; Rodriguez (yellow card) 88'; Conway 90+4'	Stadium: Patriots Point; Attendance: 3,876; Referee: Abdou Ndiaye

== Past Results ==
2024 -Team	Pts	Pld	W	L	T	GF	GA	GD
Charleston Battery	4	2	1	0	1	5	2	3
North Carolina FC	1	2	0	1	1	2	5	-3

2021 -Team	Pts	Pld	W	L	T	GF	GA	GD
Charleston Battery	3	2	1	1	0	3	-5	-2
Charlotte Independence	3	2	1	1	0	5	-3	2

2020 -Team	Pts	Pld	W	L	T	GF	GA	GD
Charleston Battery	3	1	1	0	0	3	0	0
North Carolina FC	0	1	0	1	0	0	-3	-3

2019-Team	Pts	Pld	W	L	T	GF	GA	GD
Charleston Battery	8	4	2	0	2	5	2	+3
North Carolina FC	5	4	1	1	2	6	4	+2
Charlotte Independence	2	4	0	2	2	1	6	-5

2018-Team	Pts	Pld	W	L	T	GF	GA	GD
North Carolina FC	7	4	2	1	1	9	5	+4
Charleston Battery	6	4	1	0	3	4	2	+2
Charlotte Independence	2	4	0	2	2	5	11	-6

2017-Team	Pts	Pld	W	L	T	GF	GA	GD
Charleston Battery	6	2	2	0	0	4	0	+4
Charlotte Independence	0	2	0	2	0	0	4	-4

2016-Team	Pts	Pld	W	L	T	GF	GA	GD
Charleston Battery	7	4	2	1	1	6	5	+1
Charlotte Independence	7	4	2	1	1	5	4	+1
Wilmington Hammerheads	2	4	0	2	2	4	5	-1

2015-Team	Pts	Pld	W	L	T	GF	GA	GD
Charleston Battery	7	4	2	1	1	6	4	+2
Charlotte Independence	5	4	1	2	2	6	7	-1
Wilmington Hammerheads	3	4	0	1	3	4	5	-1

2014-Team	Pts	Pld	W	L	T	GF	GA	GD
Wilmington Hammerheads	10	4	3	1	0	4	1	+3
Charlotte Eagles	9	4	2	1	1	4	5	-1
Charleston Battery	1	4	0	3	1	1	5	-4

2013-Team	Pts	Pld	W	L	T	GF	GA	GD
Charlotte Eagles	8	4	2	0	2	6	4	+2
Charleston Battery	4	3	1	1	1	6	5	+1
Wilmington Hammerheads	1	3	0	2	1	4	7	-3

2012-Team	Pts	Pld	W	L	T	GF	GA	GD
Charlotte Eagles	10	6	3	2	1	6	6	0
Wilmington Hammerheads	8	6	2	2	2	8	9	-1
Charleston Battery	7	6	2	3	1	8	8	0

2011-Team	Pts	Pld	W	L	T	GF	GA	GD
Charleston Battery	9	4	3	1	0	8	8	0
Wilmington Hammerheads	6	4	2	2	0	7	5	+2
Charlotte Eagles	3	4	1	3	0	7	9	-2

2010-Team	Pts	Pld	W	L	T	GF	GA	GD
Charleston Battery	10	4	3	0	1	10	5	+5
Charlotte Eagles	1	4	0	3	1	5	10	-5

2009-Team	Pts	Pld	W	L	T	GF	GA	GD
Carolina RailHawks	3	2	1	1	0	2	2	0
Charleston Battery	3	2	1	1	0	2	2	0

2008-Team	Pts	Pld	W	L	T	GF	GA	GD
Carolina RailHawks	7	4	2	1	1	7	5	2
Atlanta Silverbacks	5	4	1	1	2	3	4	-1
Charleston Battery	4	4	1	2	1	4	5	-1

2007-Team	Pts	Pld	W	L	T	GF	GA	GD
Carolina Railhawks	10	4	3	0	1	7	1	6
Atlanta Silverbacks	4	4	1	2	1	4	5	-1
Charleston Battery	3	4	1	3	0	3	8	-5

2006-Team	Pts	Pld	W	L	T	GF	GA	GD
Atlanta Silverbacks	10	4	3	0	1	5	2	+3
Charleston Battery	1	4	0	3	1	2	5	-3

2005-Team	Pts	Pld	W	L	T	GF	GA	GD
Atlanta Silverbacks	3	2	1	1	0	3	3	0
Charleston Battery	3	2	1	1	0	3	3	0

2004-Team	Pts	Pld	W	L	T	GF	GA	GD
Atlanta Silverbacks	6	2	2	0	0	6	2	+4
Charleston Battery	0	2	0	2	0	2	6	-4

2003-Team	Pts	Pld	W	L	T	GF	GA	GD
Charleston Battery	7	4	2	1	1	8	4	+4
Atlanta Silverbacks	7	4	2	1	1	8	6	+2
Charlotte Eagles	3	4	1	3	0	3	9	-6

2002-Team	Pts	Pld	W	L	T	GF	GA	GD
Atlanta Silverbacks	7	4	2	1	1	5	4	+1
Charleston Battery	6	4	1	0	3	5	3	+2
Charlotte Eagles	2	4	0	2	2	5	8	-3

2001-Team	Pts	Pld	W	L	T	GF	GA	GD
Charlotte Eagles	9	4	3	1	0	11	7	+4
Charleston Battery	9	4	3	1	0	9	5	+4
Atlanta Silverbacks	0	4	0	4	0	4	12	-8

2000-Team	Pts	Pld	W	L	T	GF	GA	GD
Raleigh Capital Express	9	4	3	1	0	7	6	+1
Charleston Battery	6	4	2	2	0	7	7	0
Atlanta Silverbacks	3	4	1	3	0	7	8	-1

== See also ==
- James River Cup
- Voyageurs Cup
