= Michael Rabasca =

American soccer coach (born 1969)

Personal information
- Full name: Michael Rabasca
- Date of birth: June 22, 1969 (age 57)
- Place of birth: United States

Team information
- Current team: LA Galaxy (director of cognitive performance)

Managerial career
- Years: Team
- 2018–2019: Toronto FC II

Michael Rabasca (born June 22, 1969) is an American soccer coach who serves as the director of cognitive performance for the LA Galaxy in Major League Soccer. He previously served as head coach of Toronto FC II in USL League One.

== Career ==
Rabasca played soccer during his time at Sachem High School North and also played college soccer with the New England Nor'easters.

In 1996, Rabasca was a coach at Marcos de Niza High School. He became involved with the Desert Vista High School boys' soccer program in 1997 as their head coach. Throughout his tenure with the high school team, he led them to three state titles.

In 2014, he worked with the Toronto FC staff under head coach Greg Vanney. Initially, he was assigned to work with the club's academy team and later joined the first team staff as the director of the high-performance department. Rabasca received his first managerial stint in 2018 for Toronto FC II in USL League One. He left the reserve team in 2020 after two seasons at the helm. Following his departure from the reserve squad, he returned to the first team to his original department.

In 2021, Vanney recruited him to join his staff with the LA Galaxy as his cognitive performance director.
