= Austin Guerrero =

American soccer player (born 1989)

Personal information
- Full name: Austin Henry Guerrero Loomer
- Date of birth: March 24, 1989 (age 37)
- Place of birth: Chula Vista, California, United States
- Height: 6 ft 0 in (1.83 m)
- Position: Goalkeeper

Team information
- Current team: San Diego Loyal
- Number: 1

Youth career
- 2004–2007: Otay Ranch High School

College career
Years	Team	Apps	(Gls)
2007–2010	Portland Pilots		

Senior career*
Years	Team	Apps	(Gls)
2009–2010	Portland Timbers U23s	10	(0)
2011–2012	Tigres UANL	0	(0)
2013–2015	Altamira	25	(0)
2015–2016	Puebla	0	(0)
2016–2017	Alianza	13	(0)
2018	North Carolina FC	1	(0)
2019	Reno 1868	0	(0)
2020–2022	San Diego Loyal	20	(0)

International career^{‡}
2008	United States U20	1	(0)
- * Club domestic league appearances and goals as of June 20, 2022 ‡ National team caps and goals as of October 15, 2018

Austin Henry Guerrero Loomer (born March 24, 1989) is an American professional soccer player who plays as a goalkeeper for San Diego Loyal SC in the USL Championship.

== Youth career ==
Born in Chula Vista, California, Guerrero played for prominent youth side Surf Soccer Club in San Diego, CA. While at Surf Soccer Club, he led his team to a peak ranking of #10 nationally while winning the 2006 Region IV Championship. Guerrero also started for the Cal South ODP team from 2002 to 2007 and Region IV ODP team from 2003 to 2007. With Guerrero in goal, the Cal South ODP side won the 2006 National ODP Championship and the Region IV team won National ODP Championships in 3 consecutive years from 2004 to 2006. Guerrero was invited to the renowned Adidas ESP Camp in 2006 and was recognized in the camp's First XI honors and was awarded the Golden Glove for the camp.

Coming out of high school, Guerrero was rated the No. 16 high school recruit and No. 3 goalkeeper in US according to Rise Magazine. He committed to playing collegiate soccer at the University of Portland under coach Bill Irwin.

== College career ==
In 2007, in his debut season at the University of Portland, Guerrero was named to the Copa de Causeway All-Tournament Team and won WCC League Player of the Week honors on October 8, registering 9 saves in a shutout against San Diego. At one point, he held a scoreless streak of 435 consecutive minutes without allowing a goal. Ultimately, Guerrero led the Portland to an NCAA playoff appearance after leading the WCC in shutouts (8) and saves (85). He was named to the All-WCC First Team and All-Freshman team, in addition to being named to Soccer America's National All-Freshman Team, Top Drawer Soccer's National All-Rookie Team, and College Soccer News' National All-Freshman Second Team. At the end of the season, Guerrero was called into the United States Under-20 National Team camp to play Honduras.

During the 2008 season, Guerrero was named as an All-WCC Honorable Mention after leading the WCC League in saves (91) and making 7 saves in a match on 5 separate occasions.

During the 2009 season, Guerrero was named the Smith Barney Classic Defensive Player of the Tournament after leading Portland to winning the tournament. He was also named to the Soccer America National Team of the Week and WCC League Player of the Week honors on September 28 after leading Portland to the Husky Fever Classic Tournament Championship. Guerrero ultimately ranked second in the WCC league in goals against average (0.95), save percentage (.784), and saves (80), while ranking third in shutouts (5). He led Portland to the NCAA playoff quarterfinals to end the season. At the end of the season, he was named to the All-WCC First Team and a Top Drawer Soccer's Honorable Mention for his performance on the season.

In his final 2010 season in Portland, Guerrero showed his class while making a career high 10 saves in a single match against Washington. He ended the season ranking second in the WCC League in shutouts (6), saves (90), and save percentage (.789). He was named to the All-WCC First team and a 2nd Team West Region All-American.

When closing his university career at Portland, Guerrero was a three-time All-WCC First Team performer. He recorded the most WCC league shutouts for a career (16) and single season (6 - 2007) in league history. Guerrero sat in the Portland Pilots' record book among prominent goalkeeping legends Kasey Keller and Luis Robles as the all-time leader in saves (346), was second in appearances (82), third in shutouts (22), and seventh in goals against average (1.17). After completing his time at Portland, Guerrero signed with Tigres UANL.

== Professional career ==
=== Portland Timbers U23s ===
Guerrero appeared in 10 matches for the Portland Timbers U23s during 2009, leading the team to a PDL playoff berth. The team was eventually eliminated by the Seattle Wolves by a score of 3–2 in the playoffs.

=== UANL Tigres ===
Guerrero was signed by Liga MX side Tigres UANL after his time in the United States. Despite not getting as many first team matches as he would have preferred, he took this period to refine his skills in an elite professional setting and attributed his exceptional distribution to this developmental period in Mexico.

=== Altamira ===
Guerrero joined Altamira FC on loan from Tigres in 2013 in order to get more competitive playing time, and appeared in 32 Ascenso MX and Copa MX matches for the club. He led the club into the Liguilla Playoffs, but they were eventually eliminated. Altamira FC was then dissolved after the 2015 Clausura tournament, and Guerrero again sought to play for a Liga MX side.

=== Puebla ===
Guerrero joined Puebla FC during 2015 and showed well in a 1-0 friendly victory over Boca Juniors. He represented the club in reserve team matches and appeared for the first team on the bench as a substitute while honing his skills behind an experienced goalkeeping corps.

== Career statistics ==
=== Club ===
As of matches played by July 6, 2016

Club	Season	League		Playoff cup		League cup		Friendly		Total	
Club	Season	Apps	Goals	Apps	Goals	Apps	Goals	Apps	Goals	Apps	Goals
UANL Tigres	Clausura 2011	0	0	0	0	0	0	0	0	0	0
UANL Tigres	Apertura 2011	0	0	0	0	0	0	0	0	0	0
UANL Tigres	Clausura 2012	0	0	0	0	0	0	1	0	1	0
UANL Tigres	Apertura 2012	0	0	0	0	0	0	2	0	2	0
UANL Tigres	Clausura 2013	0	0	0	0	0	0	0	0	0	0
UANL Tigres	Total	0	0	0	0	0	0	3	0	3	0
Altamira FC	Apertura 2013	0	0	0	0	0	0	0	0	0	0
Altamira FC	Clausura 2014	3	0	0	0	2	0	0	0	5	0
Altamira FC	Apertura 2014	11	0	0	0	0	0	0	0	11	0
Altamira FC	Clausura 2015	11	0	1	0	4	0	0	0	16	0
Altamira FC	Total	25	0	1	0	6	0	0	0	32	0
Puebla FC Reserves	Apertura 2015	8	0	0	0	0	0	1	0	9	0
Puebla FC Reserves	Clausura 2016	9	0	0	0	0	0	0	0	9	0
Puebla FC Reserves	Total	17	0	0	0	0	0	1	0	18	0
Career total		42	0	1	0	6	0	4	0	53	0

=== International ===
As of matches played by July 6, 2016

National team	Year	Apps	Goals
United States U-20	2008	1	0
Career totals		1	0
