= Bernhard Luxbacher =

Austrian footballer (born 1994)

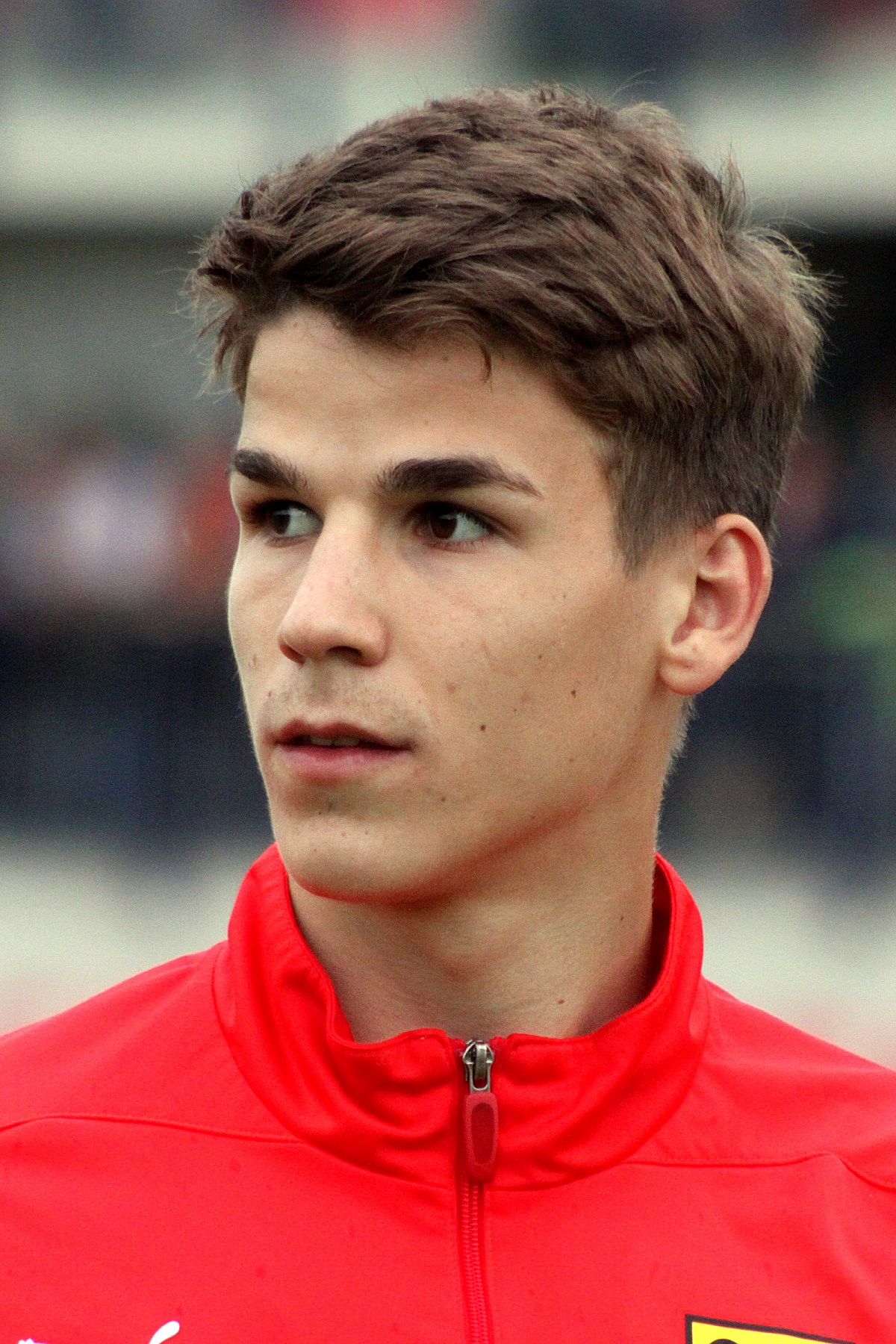
- Luxbacher playing for Austria in 2013

Personal information
- Full name: Bernhard Luxbacher
- Date of birth: 18 November 1994 (age 31)
- Place of birth: Wien, Austria
- Height: 1.77 m (5 ft 10 in)
- Position: Winger

Team information
- Current team: First Vienna
- Number: 8

Youth career
- –2013: Austria Wien

Senior career*
Years	Team	Apps	(Gls)
2013–2016	Austria Wien	1	(0)
2014	→ St. Pölten (loan)	10	(0)
2015–2016	→ FAC (loan)	25	(5)
2017	FCM Traiskirchen	11	(0)
2017	Wiener SK	15	(2)
2018	North Carolina	5	(0)
2019–2020	Mauerwerk	15	(1)
2021–	First Vienna	126	(9)

International career
2012–2013	Austria U19	4	(1)
2014	Austria U21	1	(0)
- * Club domestic league appearances and goals as of 17 May 2026

Bernhard Luxbacher (born 18 November 1994) is an Austrian footballer who plays for First Vienna.

== Career ==
Luxbacher is a youth exponent from FK Austria Wien. He made his Bundesliga debut at 23 November 2013 against FC Wacker Innsbruck. He replaced Philipp Hosiner after 76 minutes.

== Career statistics ==
As of 26 May 2016.

Appearances and goals by club, season and competition
Club	Season	League			Cup		Continental		Total	
Club	Season	League	Apps	Goals	Apps	Goals	Apps	Goals	Apps	Goals
Austria Wien II	2011–12	Regional League East	9	2	—				9	2
Austria Wien II	2012–13	Regional League East	25	2	—				25	2
Austria Wien II	2013–14	Regional League East	14	1	—				14	1
Austria Wien II	2014–15	Regional League East	10	1	—				10	1
Austria Wien II	Totals		58	6	—				58	6
Austria Wien	2013–14	Bundesliga	1	0	0	0	0	0	0	0
St. Pölten (loan)	2014–15	First League	10	0	1	0	—		11	0
Floridsdorfer AC (loan)	2015–16	First League	25	5	1	0	—		26	5
Career totals			94	11	2	0	0	0	96	11
