= Donovan Ewolo =

Cameroonian footballer (born 1996)

Personal information
- Full name: Ulrich Donovan Ewolo
- Date of birth: 16 June 1996 (age 30)
- Place of birth: Yaounde, Cameroon
- Height: 1.91 m (6 ft 3 in)
- Position: Forward

Team information
- Current team: Visakha
- Number: 7

Senior career*
Years	Team	Apps	(Gls)
- Rainbow Bamenda
- AS Fortuna
2015–2017	Dragon Club		
2018–2021	MFK Vyškov		
2018–2019	→ North Carolina (loan)	61	(15)
2020	→ IFK Luleå (loan)	0	(0)
2020–2021	→ Heilongjiang Lava Spring (loan)	44	(17)
2022–2023	Zhejiang FC	44	(11)
2023	→ Guangxi Pingguo Haliao (loan)	18	(3)
2024	Al-Adalah	13	(4)
2024–2025	Khaitan SC		
2025–2026	Al-Jazeera		
2026–	Visakha	7	(5)

International career
- Cameroon U17
- Cameroon U23
- * Club domestic league appearances and goals as of 9 November 2026

Ulrich Donovan Ewolo (born 16 June 1996) is a Cameroonian professional football player who currently plays as a forward for Visakha.

On 10 September 2024, Chinese Football Association announced that Ewolo was banned from football-related activities for five years, for involving in match-fixing.

== Career ==
Ahead of the 2020 season, Ewolo and teammate Pascal Eboussi joined Swedish Division 1 side IFK Luleå on loan but their arrival at the club was delayed due to travel bans arising from the COVID-19 pandemic. On 3 October 2020, Ewolo joined China League One club Heilongjiang Lava Spring on loan.

On 1 February 2022, Ewolo signed with Chinese Super League club Zhejiang FC. On 6 July 2023, Ewolo joined China League One club Guangxi Pingguo Haliao on loan.

On 31 January 2024, Ewolo joined Saudi First Division League club Al-Adalah.

== Career statistics ==
As of 28 May 2024

Appearances and goals by club, season and competition
Club	Season	League			Cup		Continental		Other		Total	
Club	Season	Division	Apps	Goals	Apps	Goals	Apps	Goals	Apps	Goals	Apps	Goals
North Carolina (loan)	2018	USL Championship	30	7	1	1	—		—		31	8
North Carolina (loan)	2019	USL Championship	31	8	3	0	—		1	0	35	8
North Carolina (loan)	Total		61	15	4	1	—		1	0	66	16
Heilongjiang Lava Spring (loan)	2020	China League One	9	2	—		—		2	1	11	3
Heilongjiang Lava Spring (loan)	2021	China League One	33	14	0	0	—		—		33	14
Heilongjiang Lava Spring (loan)	Total		42	16	0	0	—		2	1	44	17
Zhejiang FC	2022	Chinese Super League	32	10	3	0	—		—		35	10
Zhejiang FC	2023	Chinese Super League	12	1	1	1	—		—		13	2
Zhejiang FC	Total		44	11	4	1	—		—		48	12
Guangxi Pingguo Haliao (loan)	2023	China League One	18	3	—		—		—		18	3
Al-Adalah	2023–24	First Division League	13	4	—		—		—		13	4
Career total			178	49	8	2	0	0	3	1	189	52
