= Nikola Popović (football coach) =

Portuguese/Serbian football coach (born 1973)

Personal information
- Date of birth: 28 October 1973 (age 53)
- Place of birth: Belgrade, SFR Yugoslavia

Team information
- Current team: Red Star Belgrade (assistant)

Managerial career
- Years: Team
- 2005–2006: Olivais e Moscavide (intern)
- 2006–2007: Olivais e Moscavide (assistant)
- 2007: Vihren Sandanski (assistant)
- 2007–2010: Varzim
- 2010–2011: Cape Verde (assistant); AD Ceuta (assistant); Chernomorets Burgas (assistant)
- 2011–2012: Al Dhafra (assistant)
- 2012–2014: Sertanense
- 2014–2015: Aspire Academy
- 2015–2016: Benfica B (assistant)
- 2016: Swope Park Rangers (assistant)
- 2017: Swope Park Rangers
- 2017–2019: Ottawa Fury
- 2020–2021: Dunajská Streda (assistant)
- 2021–: Red Star Belgrade (assistant)

Nikola Popović (born 28 October 1973) is a Portuguese and Serbian football coach. A UEFA Pro licensed coach (Portuguese Football Federation) – the highest UEFA license available, Popović has coached in ten countries.

== Coaching career ==
Popović was raised in Lisbon, Portugal where he began his career with CD Olivais e Moscavide in the Segunda Divisão. Following the 2006–07 season, Popović moved to FC Vihren Sandanski in the Bulgarian A Football Group. He returned to Portugal to Segunda Liga side Varzim SC, where he won the Liga Intercalar.

Popović had a stint as an assistant coach with the Cape Verde national team in 2010, before joining Spanish Segunda Division B side AD Ceuta helping guide the club to the Copa del Rey Round of 32 – the club's best ever showing in the tournament falling to eventual runners-up, Barcelona. Later that same season, Popović linked up with Bulgarian side Chernomorets Burgas in the Bulgarian A Football Group, helping the side to a quarterfinal appearance in the Bulgarian Cup.

He then moved to the United Arab Emirates joining Al Dhafra for the 2011–12 season as an assistant to Baltemar Brito – José Mourinho's former assistant coach – helping them win the Vice President Cup. Popović then took charge of Sertanense FC in the Portuguese Second Division – his first head coaching role in 2012–13. He then joined Qatar's Aspire Academy in 2014, before returning to Portugal and Benfica B in 2015.

After one season at United Soccer League side Swope Park Rangers as Marc Dos Santos' assistant coach in 2016, Popović was named as the head coach of the side on 21 November 2016. During his first season as head coach of Swope Park Rangers, Popović helped the side win the Western Conference Championship and eventually reaching the league final for the second season in a row.

On 21 December 2017, it was announced that Popović would take over as head coach of the Ottawa Fury of the United Soccer League.

In May 2018, he won award of USL Coach Of The Month and reached the semi-finals in the Canadian Championship. In the same season, he managed to have the most successful start of the season in Ottawa Fury FC, achieved most goals scored in history of the club and qualified for the USL playoffs for the first time in history of the club in USL. In the Canadian Cup, the team also reached the semi-finals.

He cane back to Europe because is invited by Hélder Cristóvão to assist him in DAC1904. Popović worked already with Hélder in Benfica, and now joins him at Dunajská Streda, Slovak Super Liga.

In 2021, he joined Red Star Belgrade as an assistant coach under Coach Dejan Stanković. At the end of the 2021-22 season, he achieved with the team the Serbian Super League - Championship, Serbian Cup - Championship and Europa League 1/8 Final. In season 2022-23 Serbian Super League champion, qualified for the Europa League and reached the UEFA Champions League Playoff.

On May 23, 2024, Nikola Popovic was announced as the new coach of Atlético Clube de Portugal. He has been highlighted in the Portuguese press for his career and experience in various countries and continents.

== Honours ==
Honour	Club	Date
Liga Intercalar Cup Champion	Varzim	2007–08
UAE Vice-president Cup Champion	Al Dhafra	2011–12
USL Western Conference Champion	Swope Park Rangers	2016
USL Cup Runner-up	Swope Park Rangers	2016
USL Western Conference Champion	Swope Park Rangers	2017
USL Cup Runner-up	Swope Park Rangers	2017
USL Coach of the Month	Ottawa Fury FC	May 2018
Super Liga Champion	Red Star Belgrade	2021/22
Serbian Cup Champion	Red Star Belgrade	2021/22
Super Liga Champion	Red Star Belgrade	2022/23

== Statistics ==
=== Managerial statistics ===
As of 18 May 2018

Team	From	To	Record				
Team	From	To	G	W	D	L	Win %
(United States) Swope Park Rangers	21 November 2016	17 November 2017	36	20	7	9	55.56
(Canada) Ottawa Fury	21 December 2017	Present	77	30	18	29	38.96
Total			113	50	25	38	44.25
