= 2022 Phoenix Rising FC season =

Phoenix Rising FC
2022 season
- Owners: List: Berke Bakay Alex Zheng Tim Riester Mark Detmer Brett M. Johnson Didier Drogba Brandon McCarthy Diplo Pete Wentz David Rappaport Dave Stearns Rick Hauser William Kraus Kevin Kusatsu Mark Leber Jim Scussel Christopher Yeung
- Manager: Rick Schantz (8–11–5); Danny Stone (interim) (0–1–0); Juan Guerra (4–4–1)
- Stadium: Wild Horse Pass Stadium
- USL Championship: 10th, Western Conference
- USLC Playoffs: Did not qualify
- U.S. Open Cup: 4th round
- Top goalscorer: Aodhan Quinn (9)
- Highest home attendance: 8,615 (September 10 vs Oakland Roots SC)
- Lowest home attendance: 5,425 (October 1 vs New York Red Bulls II)
- Average home league attendance: 7,358
- Biggest win: 4–0 (July 30 vs Colorado Springs Switchbacks); 5–1 (October 1 vs New York Red Bulls II)
- Biggest defeat: 0–7 (May 24 vs New Mexico United) (Club Record)
Home colors	Away colors	Charity colors

The 2022 Phoenix Rising FC season was the club's ninth season in the USL Championship and their sixth as Rising FC. The season ran from March 12 thru October 15. For the first time as Phoenix Rising FC, the team failed to make the playoffs.

== Competitions ==
=== Friendlies ===
All times from this point on Mountain Standard Time (UTC-07:00)

February 8, 2022 Preseason	Phoenix Rising FC	1–2	Houston Dynamo FC	Tucson, Arizona
1:00 pm MST	Lambert 24'; Rodriguez (yellow card) 43'	HOU Report	Baird 2'; Ferreira 18'	Stadium: Kino North Stadium
Note: Closed door scrimmage

February 12, 2022 Preseason	Phoenix Rising FC	2–1	Sporting Kansas City	Chandler, Arizona
4:30 pm MST	Seijas (yellow card) 20'; Moar 28'; Quinn (yellow card) 31'; Levin (yellow card) 69'; Rodríguez 81' (pen.)	PHX Report; SKC Report	Sallói 12'; Russell (yellow card) 27'; Duke (yellow card) 55'	Stadium: Wild Horse Pass Stadium
Note: Closed door scrimmage

February 19, 2022 Preseason	Phoenix Rising FC	2–2	Louisville City FC	Chandler, Arizona
7:00 pm MST	Njie (yellow card) 10'; King 17'; Repetto (yellow card) 33'; Moar (yellow card) 56'; Calistri 66'; Levin (yellow card) 71'	PHX Report; LOU Report	defender (yellow card) 33'; DelPiccolo 45+3'; Harris 54'	Stadium: Wild Horse Pass Stadium

February 25, 2022 Preseason	Phoenix Rising FC	5–0	Valley United FC	Chandler, Arizona
5:30 pm MST	Calistri 18'; Rodríguez 21' (pen.); King (yellow card) 27'; Antwi 31', 45'; Hurst 61'	PHX Report	Trialist (yellow card) 46'; Trialist (yellow card) 73'	Stadium: Wild Horse Pass Stadium
Note: Closed door scrimmage; 75-minute game

February 25, 2022 Preseason	Phoenix Rising FC	2–2	Detroit City FC	Chandler, Arizona
TBD	Own Goal 66'; Flood 76'	PHX Report	Atuahene 26', 30'	Stadium: Wild Horse Pass Stadium
Note: Closed door scrimmage

March 5, 2022 Preseason	Phoenix Rising FC	3–2	Grand Canyon University	Chandler, Arizona
4:30 pm MST	Antwi 17'; Seijas 32'; Wise 79'	PHX Report	Joash 8' (pen.), 68'; Mondragon (yellow card) 67'	Stadium: Wild Horse Pass Stadium
Note: Closed door scrimmage

March 5, 2022 Preseason	Phoenix Rising FC	5–1	FC Tucson	Chandler, Arizona
7:00 pm MST	Lambert (yellow card) 8'; Hurst 29'; Epps 38', 80', 82'; Quinn 74'	PHX Report	Bedoya 12'	Stadium: Wild Horse Pass Stadium
Note: Closed door scrimmage

=== USL Championship ===
Overall								Home						Away					
Pld	W	D	L	GF	GA	GD	Pts	W	D	L	GF	GA	GD	W	D	L	GF	GA	GD
34	12	6	16	50	58	−8	42	9	3	5	32	21	+11	3	3	11	18	37	−19

Source: Match reports

==== Results by round ====
Round	1	2	3	4	5	6	7	8	9	10	11	12	13	14	15	16	17	18	19	20	21	22	23	24	25	26	27	28	29	30	31	32	33	34
Stadium	H	A	H	A	H	H	H	A	H	H	A	A	H	H	A	A	H	A	A	H	A	H	H	A	A	H	A	H	A	A	A	H	A	H
Result	W	L	L	W	W	W	W	L	W	L	L	W	L	L	L	L	D	L	D	D	D	W	D	L	L	W	L	L	L	D	W	W	L	W
Position	1	8	8	7	6	5	4	4	4	4	4	4	5	7	11	11	11	11	11	11	11	10	9	10	11	10	10	12	12	12	12	11	12	10

Updated to match(es) played on October 15, 2022. Source: Match reports
A = Away; H = Home; W = Win; D = Draw; L = Loss

==== Matches ====
March 12, 2022 1	Phoenix Rising FC	4–2	Monterey Bay FC	Chandler, Arizona
7:30 pm MST	Madrid 2'; Hurst 27'; Rodríguez 34'; Quinn 40'; King (yellow card) 60'; Lambert (yellow card) 90+1'	PHX Report; MB Report	Murphy (yellow card) 51'; Conneh 70'; Rebollar 87'	Stadium: Wild Horse Pass Stadium; Attendance: 8,409; Referee: Calin Radosav

March 19, 2022 2	Las Vegas Lights FC	2–1	Phoenix Rising FC	Las Vegas, Nevada
7:00 pm MST	Trejo 12'; Jennings (yellow card) 39'; Quezada 68'; Almaguer (yellow card) 85'	PHX Report	Repetto 77'; Farrell (yellow card) 89'	Stadium: Cashman Field; Referee: Joseph Salinas

March 26, 2022 3	Phoenix Rising FC	2–3	San Diego Loyal SC	Chandler, Arizona
7:30 pm MST	King (yellow card) 20'; Musa 67'; Seijas 71'; Hurst (yellow card) 90+4'	PHX Report; SDG Report	Conway 38'; Vassell 45+2'; Adams (yellow card) 73'; Guido (yellow card) 73' (goal) 76'; Bench Area (yellow card) 74'	Stadium: Wild Horse Pass Stadium; Attendance: 7,321; Referee: Elton Garcia

April 2, 2022 4	San Antonio FC	0–2	Phoenix Rising FC	San Antonio, Texas
5:30 pm MST	Traore (yellow card) 19'	PHX Report; SAN Report	King (yellow card) 14'; Repetto 56'; Epps 90+1'	Stadium: Toyota Field; Attendance: 5,511; Referee: Eric Tattersall

April 9, 2022 5	Phoenix Rising FC	3–1	LA Galaxy II	Chandler, Arizona
7:30 pm MST	Seijas 31', 42' (yellow card) 56'; Calistri (yellow card) 74'; Epps 90'	PHX Report	Davila (yellow card) 45+2'; Salazar (yellow card) 65'; Cabral 68'; Barry (yellow card) 76'	Stadium: Wild Horse Pass Stadium; Attendance: 8,019; Referee: Luis Guardia

April 16, 2022 6	Phoenix Rising FC	1–0	New Mexico United	Chandler, Arizona
7:30 pm MST	Quinn (yellow card) 13'; Hurst 14' (yellow card) 81'; King (yellow card) 27'; Lambert (yellow card) 41'; Lundt (yellow card) 70'; Flood (yellow card) 90'	PHX Report	Etaka (yellow card) 63'; Seymore (yellow card) 63'	Stadium: Wild Horse Pass Stadium; Attendance: 7,011; Referee: Gerald Flores

April 23, 2022 7	Phoenix Rising FC	2–1	Miami FC	Chandler, Arizona
7:30 pm MST	Seijas (yellow card) 23' (goal) 88'; Lambert 45'; Madrid (yellow card) 90+5'		Pérez 27'; Williams (yellow card) 40'	Stadium: Wild Horse Pass Stadium; Attendance: 6,785; Referee: Melvin Rivas

May 1, 2022 8	LA Galaxy II	3–0	Phoenix Rising FC	Carson, California
5:00 pm MST	Cabral 2' (yellow card) 63'; Dunbar 13'; Perez 43'; Barry (yellow card) 57'; Doyle (yellow card) 74'; Williams (yellow card) 88'	PHX Report	Quinn (yellow card) 19'; Flood (yellow card) 28'; King (red card) 36'	Stadium: Dignity Health Sports Park; Referee: Mark Allatin

May 7, 2022 9	Phoenix Rising FC	3–0	San Antonio FC	Chandler, Arizona
7:30 pm MST	Hurst 26', 34' (yellow card) 88'; Epps (yellow card) 45+3'; Moar (yellow card) 45+3'; Njie (yellow card) 64' (red card) 72'; Antwi (yellow card) 86' (goal) 90+5'	PHX Report; SAN Report	Taintor (yellow card) 47'; Abu (yellow card) 54'	Stadium: Wild Horse Pass Stadium; Attendance: 6,486; Referee: Calin Radosav

May 15, 2022 10	Phoenix Rising FC	1–5	Tampa Bay Rowdies	Chandler, Arizona
5:00 pm MST	Seijas 15'; Farrell (yellow card) 39' (red card) 69'	PHX Report	LaCava 24'; Harris 36' (yellow card) 41'; Areman 45+3'; Haugli 47' (o.g.); Hilton (yellow card) 59'; Flood 68' (o.g.); Wyke (yellow card) 86'	Stadium: Wild Horse Pass Stadium; Attendance: 7,115; Referee: Matthew Franz

May 24, 2022 11	New Mexico United	7–0	Phoenix Rising FC	Albuquerque, New Mexico
6:00 pm MST	Wehan 6'; Portillo 10' (pen.), 30' (pen.); Swartz 18'; Nava (yellow card) 45+2' (goal) 78'; Rivas (yellow card) 52'; King 75' (o.g.); Bruce 82'	PHX Report; NMU Report	Anguiano (yellow card) 61'; Hardy (yellow card) 71'; Madrid (yellow card) 81'	Stadium: UNM Soccer Complex; Referee: Matthew Corrigan
Note: Postponed by Phoenix Rising FC on May 20 due to COVID-19 concerns.

May 28, 2022 12	Hartford Athletic	1–2	Phoenix Rising FC	Hartford, Connecticut
4:00 pm MST	Saydee 20'; Jadama (yellow card) 38'; Vassell (yellow card) 88'	PHX Report; HFD Report	Farrell (yellow card) 9'; Lambert 35' (yellow card) 71'; Hurst 37'; Lundt (yellow card) 73'; Njie (yellow card) 90+2'	Stadium: Trinity Health Stadium; Referee: Luis Arroyo

June 4, 2022 13	Phoenix Rising FC	0–1	Birmingham Legion FC	Chandler, Arizona
7:30 pm MST	Moar (yellow card) 35'; Njie (yellow card) 50'	PHX Report; BHM Report	Dean (yellow card) 20'; Herivaux (yellow card) 44'; Kasim 58'	Stadium: Wild Horse Pass Stadium; Attendance: 6,912; Referee: Gerald Flores

June 11, 2022 14	Phoenix Rising FC	0–1	El Paso Locomotive FC	Chandler, Arizona
7:30 pm MST	Hurst (yellow card) 4'; Seijas (yellow card) 45'; Farrell (yellow card) 62'; King (yellow card) 66'; Madrid (red card) 69'	PHX Report; ELP Report	Zacarías (yellow card) 36'; Fox (yellow card) 43'; Gómez 71' (pen.) (yellow card) 85'; Garcia (yellow card) 88'	Stadium: Wild Horse Pass Stadium; Attendance: 6,512; Referee: Elijio Arreguin

June 18, 2022 15	Loudoun United FC	4–3	Phoenix Rising FC	Leesburg, Virginia
4:30 pm MST	Zanne (yellow card) 18'; Aboukoura 32', 58'; Guediri 59'; Freeman 83'	PHX Report	Quinn 9', 90+3'; Landry 90' (o.g.)	Stadium: Segra Field; Attendance: 1,588; Referee: Joshua Encarnación

June 24, 2022 16	Las Vegas Lights FC	3–2	Phoenix Rising FC	Las Vegas, Nevada
7:30 pm MST	Daroma (yellow card) 12'; Quezada 31'; Jennings 41'; Trejo 75'	PHX Report	Moar (yellow card) 39' (goal) 55'; Calistri (yellow card) 43'; Quinn 79'; Lambert (yellow card) 84'; Musa (yellow card) 89'; Farrell (yellow card) 90+1'	Stadium: Cashman Field; Referee: Malik Badawi

July 2, 2022 17	Phoenix Rising FC	2–2	Orange County SC	Chandler, Arizona
7:30 pm MST	Lambert (yellow card) 15'; Skendi 42' (o.g.); Quinn (yellow card) 78'; Repetto (yellow card) 80'; Calistri (yellow card) 89'; Antwi 90+4'	PHX Report	Iloski 6', 52' (yellow card) 90+8'; Partida (yellow card) 30' (red card) 81'; Orozco (red card) 80'	Stadium: Wild Horse Pass Stadium; Attendance: 8,087; Referee: Michael Radchuk

July 9, 2022 18	Memphis 901 FC	3–1	Phoenix Rising FC	Memphis, Tennessee
5:30 pm MST	Goodrum 29'; Buckmaster 34' (yellow card) 84'; Smith 86'	PHX Report; MEM Report	Lambert 37'; Flood (red card) 82'	Stadium: AutoZone Park; Attendance: 3,703; Referee: Matthew Conger

July 20, 2022 19	Louisville City FC	0–0	Phoenix Rising FC	Louisville, Kentucky
4:00 pm MST		PHX Report; LOU Report	Lambert (yellow card) 6'; Njie (yellow card) 37'	Stadium: Lynn Family Stadium; Attendance: 10,494; Referee: Thomas Snyder

July 23, 2022 20	Phoenix Rising FC	0–0	Sacramento Republic FC	Chandler, Arizona
7:30 pm MST	Njie (yellow card) 40'; Lambert (yellow card) 54'; Musa (yellow card) 55'; Moar (yellow card) 77'	PHX Report; SAC Report	Cuello (yellow card) 35'; Ross (yellow card) 85'	Stadium: Wild Horse Pass Stadium; Referee: Brandon Stevis

July 27, 2022 21	Oakland Roots SC	0–0	Phoenix Rising FC	Oakland, California
7:00 pm MST	Karlsson (yellow card) 51'; Fuenmayor (yellow card) 79'	PHX Report; OAK Report	Farrell (yellow card) 56'; Donasiyano (red card) 90+4'	Stadium: Laney College Football Stadium; Attendance: 3,336; Referee: Matthew Corrigan

July 30, 2022 22	Phoenix Rising FC	4–0	Colorado Springs Switchbacks FC	Chandler, Arizona
7:30 pm MST	Quinn 19'; Williams 25'; Farrell (yellow card) 45' (goal) 49'; Rodríguez (yellow card) 85'; Antwi 90+4'	PHX Report; COS Report	Lindley (yellow card) 52'; Mahoney (yellow card) 79'	Stadium: Wild Horse Pass Stadium; Referee: Kevin Broadley

August 6, 2022 23	Phoenix Rising FC	0–0	Las Vegas Lights FC	Chandler, Arizona
7:30 pm MST	Moar (yellow card) 45+5'; Antwi (yellow card) 90'	PHX Report	Almaguer (yellow card) 9'; Iskenderian (yellow card) 53'; Keinan (yellow card) 90+4'; Traore (yellow card) 90+6'	Stadium: Wild Horse Pass Stadium; Referee: Greg Dopka

August 12, 2022 24	Orange County SC	2–1	Phoenix Rising FC	Irvine, California
7:00 pm MST	Skendi (yellow card) 9'; Iloski 20', 62'; Scott (yellow card) 88'; Okoli (yellow card) 90'		Williams 23'; Lambert (yellow card) 90+2'	Stadium: Championship Soccer Stadium; Referee: Sergii Demianchuk

August 27, 2022 25	El Paso Locomotive FC	3–1	Phoenix Rising FC	El Paso, Texas
6:30 pm MST	Bahner (yellow card) 10'; Fox (yellow card) 21'; Solignac 28', 64'; Mares 45+1'; Zacarías (yellow card) 82'		Njie (yellow card) 24'; Flood 65'; Farrell (yellow card) 76'; Calistri (yellow card) 90+1'	Stadium: Southwest University Park; Attendance: 6,870; Referee: John Griggs

August 31, 2022 26	Phoenix Rising FC	2–1	Rio Grande Valley FC	Chandler, Arizona
7:30 pm MST	Seijas 15', 67'; Rodriguez (yellow card) 75'; Repetto (yellow card) 90+3'	PHX Report	Cabezas (yellow card) 17'; Ackwei (yellow card) 21'; Pinzón 41'; Pimentel (yellow card) 49'	Stadium: Wild Horse Pass Stadium; Referee: José Carlos Rivero

September 3, 2022 27	Colorado Springs Switchbacks FC	1–0	Phoenix Rising FC	Colorado Springs, Colorado
6:00 pm MST	Henríquez 55'; Ngalina (yellow card) 80'; Wheeler (yellow card) 89'	PHX Report	King (yellow card) 23' (red card) 45+3'; Lundt (yellow card) 45+5'; Williams (yellow card) 68'; Farrell (yellow card) 80'	Stadium: Weidner Field; Attendance: 7,623; Referee: Eric Tattersall

September 10, 2022 28	Phoenix Rising FC	0–2	Oakland Roots SC	Chandler, Arizona
7:30 pm MST	Farrell (yellow card) 36'; Musa (yellow card) 76'; Lambert (yellow card) 80'; Williams (yellow card) 83'; Quinn (yellow card) 90+3'	PHX Report; OAK Report	Mfeka 5', 27'; Azócar (yellow card) 32'; Johnsen (yellow card) 89'; Diaz (yellow card) 89'; Karlsson (yellow card) 90+1'; Dennis (yellow card) 90+7'	Stadium: Wild Horse Pass Stadium; Attendance: 8,615; Referee: Brandon Stevis

September 17, 2022 29	San Diego Loyal SC	3–0	Phoenix Rising FC	San Diego, California
7:00 pm MST	Vassell (yellow card) 21' (goal) 64'; Blake (yellow card) 27'; Martin (yellow card) 40'; Conway 54'; Kasanze 77' (yellow card) 80'; Carleton (yellow card) 84'	PHX Report	King (yellow card) 44'; Seijas (yellow card) 63'; Williams (red card) 68'; Njie (yellow card) 71'; Musa (yellow card) 75'; Hurst (yellow card) 90+2'	Stadium: Torero Stadium; Referee: Matthew Corrigan

September 21, 2022 30	Monterey Bay FC	3–3	Phoenix Rising FC	Seaside, California
7:30 pm MST	Volesky 9', 44'; Robinson 20' (yellow card) 72'		Quinn 15' (pen.), 44' (pen.); Rodríguez (yellow card) 23'; Musa (yellow card) 45'; Seijas (yellow card) 49'; Sargis (yellow card) 58'; Lambert (yellow card) 65'; Hurst 75'	Stadium: Cardinale Stadium; Attendance: 3,529; Referee: Malik Badawi

September 28, 2022 31	Sacramento Republic FC	0–1	Phoenix Rising FC	Sacramento, California
7:00 pm MST	Viader (yellow card) 70'; Gurr (yellow card) 85'	PHX Report	Rodríguez 35'; Torres (yellow card) 43'; Hurst (yellow card) 54'; Farrell (yellow card) 77'	Stadium: Heart Health Park; Attendance: 9,110; Referee: Matthew Conger

October 1, 2022 32	Phoenix Rising FC	5–1	New York Red Bulls II	Chandler, Arizona
7:30 pm MST	Torres 2'; Quinn 23' (pen.) (yellow card) 47'; Njie 73'; Antwi 84'; Williams 90+1'	PHX Report	Knapp (yellow card) 6' (red card) 50'; De Leon (yellow card) 43'; Adebayo-Smith 88'	Stadium: Wild Horse Pass Stadium; Attendance: 5,425; Referee: Greg Dopka

October 8, 2022 33	Rio Grande Valley FC	2–1	Phoenix Rising FC	Edinburg, Texas
5:30 pm MST	Fjeldberg 39', 55'; Ricketts (yellow card) 74'	PHX Report	Torres 48'; Seijas (yellow card) 83'; Hurst (red card) 90+4'	Stadium: H-E-B Park; Attendance: 5,333; Referee: Elijio Arreguin

October 15, 2022 34	Phoenix Rising FC	3–1	Atlanta United 2	Chandler, Arizona
7:30 pm MST	King (yellow card) 37'; Williams (yellow card) 45+4'; Torres 53'; Moar 58'; Quinn 72' (yellow card) 84'; Antwi (yellow card) 85'; Lambert (yellow card) 86'	PHX Report	Orji (yellow card) 21'; Matheus (yellow card) 35'; Conway (yellow card) 65' (goal) 80'	Stadium: Wild Horse Pass Stadium; Referee: Nabil Bensalah

==== Group table ====
Pos	Team	Pld	W	L	T	GF	GA	GD	Pts
8	El Paso Locomotive FC	34	13	14	7	56	52	+4	46
9	Las Vegas Lights FC	34	12	13	9	40	50	−10	45
10	Phoenix Rising FC	34	12	16	6	50	58	−8	42
11	LA Galaxy II	34	11	16	7	53	63	−10	40
12	Monterey Bay FC	34	12	18	4	42	59	−17	40

Source: USL Championship Standings
Rules for classification: 1) head-to-head points; 2) head-to-head goal differential; 3) points-per game within conference; 4) total wins; 5) total goal differential; 6) total goals scored; 7) points earned against top four Conference finishers; 8) disciplinary points; 9) coin toss or drawing of lots

=== U.S. Open Cup ===
As a member of the USL Championship, Phoenix Rising will enter the tournament proper in the Second Round.

April 6, 2022 Second round	Phoenix Rising FC	1–0 (a.e.t.)	Valley United FC	Chandler, Arizona
7:30 pm MST	Rodríguez (yellow card) 73'; Quinn (yellow card) 90+4'; Seijas (yellow card) 90+5'; Madrid (yellow card) 103'; Repetto 115' (yellow card) 115'	PHX Report	Contreras (yellow card) 51' (red card) 81'; Koloko (yellow card) 54'; Gaitan (yellow card) 57'; Velazco (yellow card) 87'; Cáceres (yellow card) 98'; Olmedo (yellow card) 108'	Stadium: Wild Horse Pass Stadium; Referee: Dejan Susak

April 20, 2022 Third round	Phoenix Rising FC	2–1	New Mexico United	Chandler, Arizona
7:30 pm MST	Calistri 6'; Madrid (yellow card) 80'; Hurst 81'	PHX Report	Bruce (yellow card) 8'; Brett (yellow card) 38' (goal) 65'	Stadium: Wild Horse Pass Stadium

May 11, 2022 Fourth round	Sacramento Republic FC	2–0	Phoenix Rising FC	Sacramento, California
7:30 pm MST	López (yellow card) 27'; Felipe 30'; Lacroix (yellow card) 52'; Desmond (yellow card) 63'; Lewis (yellow card) 80'; Martínez 88'	PHX Report	Njie (yellow card) 22'; Hurst (yellow card) 49'; Epps (yellow card) 51'; King (yellow card) 56'; Haugli (yellow card) 72'	Stadium: Heart Health Park

== Roster ==
No.	Name	Nationality	Position(s)	Date of birth (age)	Signed in	Previous club
Goalkeepers
26	Edward Delgado	(United States)	GK	January 23, 1998 (age 28)	2021	(United States) Las Vegas Lights FC
39	Ben Lundt	(Germany)	GK	September 24, 1995 (age 31)	2022	(United States) FC Cincinnati
99	Jack Baker	(United States)	GK	July 7, 2004 (age 22)	2022	(United States) Phoenix Rising Academy
Defenders
2	Darnell King	(United States)	DF	September 23, 1990 (age 36)	2021	(United States) Nashville SC
3	Manuel Madrid	(Mexico)	DF	August 29, 1993 (age 33)	2021	(Mexico) Mineros de Zacatecas
4	Ryan Flood	(United States)	DF	October 17, 1998 (age 27)	2021	(United States) FC Arizona
5	Sivert Haugli	(Norway)	DF	May 5, 1999 (age 27)	2022	(United States) Portland Timbers 2 (loan)
6	Baboucarr Njie	(The Gambia)	DF	June 5, 1995 (age 31)	2022	(United States) Rio Grande Valley FC
12	Channing Chasten	(United States)	DF	July 13, 2000 (age 26)	2022	(United States) Ohio State University
15	Joe Farrell	(United States)	DF	February 13, 1994 (age 32)	2021	(United States) Rochester Rhinos
16	Gabriel Torres	(Brazil)	DF	August 1, 1996 (age 30)	2022	(United States) FC Tulsa
19	Niall Dunn	(United States)	DF	October 18, 2004 (age 21)	2021	(United States) Phoenix Rising Academy
20	Hayden Sargis	(United States)	DF	May 2, 2002 (age 24)	2022	(United States) D.C. United (loan)
23	Marcus Ferkranus	(United States)	DF	May 10, 2003 (age 23)	2022	(United States) LA Galaxy (loan)
41	James Musa	(New Zealand)	DF	April 1, 1992 (age 34)	2021	(United States) Minnesota United FC
94	Blaize Hardy	(United States)	DF	June 23, 2004 (age 22)	2022	(United States) Phoenix Rising Academy
Midfielders
8	Irakoze Donasiyano	(Tanzania)	MF	February 3, 1998 (age 28)	2022	(United States) Nashville SC (loan)
10	Arturo Rodríguez	(Mexico)	MF	December 15, 1998 (age 27)	2021	(United States) North Texas SC
13	Carlos Anguiano	(United States)	MF	September 13, 1999 (age 27)	2022	(United States) Tacoma Defiance
14	Aodhan Quinn	(United States)	MF	March 22, 1992 (age 34)	2021	(United States) Orange County SC
18	Luis Manuel Seijas	(Venezuela)	MF	June 23, 1986 (age 40)	2021	(Colombia) Independiente Santa Fe
22	Jacob Harris	(United States)	MF	January 11, 2004 (age 22)	2022	(United States) Phoenix Rising Academy
23	Jonathan Levin	(Mexico)	MF	May 6, 1993 (age 33)	2021	(United States) Las Vegas Lights FC
24	Josh Martinez	(United States)	MF	June 25, 2004 (age 22)	2022	(United States) Phoenix Rising Academy
27	Kevon Lambert	(Jamaica)	MF	March 22, 1997 (age 29)	2021	(Jamaica) Montego Bay United
91	Kevin Mearse	(United States)	MF	April 23, 2004 (age 22)	2022	(United States) Phoenix Rising Academy
92	Luke Schaefer	(United States)	MF	February 23, 2004 (age 22)	2022	(United States) Phoenix Rising Academy
93	Zac Smith	(United States)	MF	September 15, 2000 (age 26)	2022	(United States) Phoenix Rising Academy
Forwards
7	Santi Moar	(Spain)	FW	September 5, 1993 (age 33)	2022	(United States) New Mexico United
17	Greg Hurst	(Scotland)	FW	April 8, 1997 (age 29)	2022	(United States) Union Omaha
20	Marcus Epps	(United States)	FW	January 16, 1995 (age 31)	2022	(United States) San Antonio FC
21	Joey Calistri	(United States)	FW	November 20, 1993 (age 32)	2019	(United States) Saint Louis FC
30	Lamin Jawneh	(The Gambia)	FW	October 31, 1995 (age 30)	2022	(Dominican Republic) Moca FC
33	Richmond Antwi	(Ghana)	FW	August 7, 2000 (age 26)	2022	(Ghana) Legon Cities FC
45	Claudio Repetto	(Italy)	FW	February 2, 1997 (age 29)	2022	(United States) Charleston Battery
95	TJ Knight	(United States)	FW	May 17, 2004 (age 22)	2022	(United States) Phoenix Rising Academy
99	JJ Williams	(United States)	FW	January 4, 1998 (age 28)	2022	(United States) FC Tulsa

Phoenix Rising Academy contract.

== Player transactions ==
=== Loan in ===
Start date	End date	Position	No.	Player	From club	Ref.
April 25, 2022	August 9, 2022	Defender	5	(Norway) Sivert Haugli	(United States) Portland Timbers 2	
June 3, 2022	End of Season	Midfielder	8	(Tanzania) Irakoze Donasiyano	(United States) Nashville SC	
July 26, 2022	October 24, 2022	Defender	23	(United States) Marcus Ferkranus	(United States) LA Galaxy	
September 8, 2022	October 24, 2022	Defender	20	(United States) Hayden Sargis	(United States) D.C. United	

=== Transfer In ===
Date	Position	No.	Player	From club	Ref.
July 27, 2022	Forward	99	(United States) JJ Williams	(United States) FC Tulsa	
September 23, 2022	Defender	16	(Brazil) Gabriel Torres	(United States) FC Tulsa	

=== Transfer Out ===
Date	Position	No.	Player	To club	Ref.
July 27, 2022	Forward	20	(United States) Marcus Epps	(United States) FC Tulsa	
September 21, 2022	Forward	45	(Italy) Claudio Repetto	(United States) Miami FC	

== Statistics ==
#	Pos.	Name	GP	GS	Min.	Goals	Assists	A yellow rectangle, denoting the yellow penalty card shown to a player being cautioned	A red rectangle, denoting the red penalty card shown to a player being sent off
14	MF	(United States) Aodhan Quinn	31	31	2686	9	7	6	0
18	MF	(Venezuela) Luis Manuel Seijas	29	20	1888	7	2	5	0
17	FW	(Scotland) Greg Hurst	31	23	1952	6	5	6	1
33	FW	(Ghana) Richmond Antwi	21	5	482	4	0	4	0
27	MF	(Jamaica) Kevon Lambert	26	25	2171	3	2	12	0
99	FW	(United States) JJ Williams	13	9	809	3	2	3	1
16	DF	(Brazil) Gabriel Torres	4	4	316	3	1	1	0
7	FW	(Spain) Santi Moar	31	26	2264	2	4	5	0
10	MF	(Mexico) Arturo Rodríguez	24	19	1641	2	3	3	0
20	FW	(United States) Marcus Epps	18	11	1053	2	2	1	0
45	FW	(Italy) Claudio Repetto	18	6	565	2	1	1	0
15	DF	(United States) Joe Farrell	31	29	2607	1	1	10	1
6	DF	(The Gambia) Baboucarr Njie	30	23	1979	1	1	7	1
41	DF	(New Zealand) James Musa	19	18	1539	1	0	6	0
4	DF	(United States) Ryan Flood	15	8	829	1	0	2	1
3	DF	(Mexico) Manuel Madrid	11	5	502	1	0	2	1
2	DF	(United States) Darnell King	31	30	2467	0	1	7	2
21	FW	(United States) Joey Calistri	32	17	1743	0	3	4	0
8	MF	(Tanzania) Irakoze Donasiyano	14	8	723	0	0	0	1
5	DF	(Norway) Sivert Haugli	9	5	469	0	0	0	0
20	DF	(United States) Hayden Sargis	6	5	454	0	0	1	0
23	DF	(United States) Marcus Ferkranus	9	4	332	0	0	0	0
13	MF	(United States) Carlos Anguiano	10	2	272	0	0	1	0
30	FW	(The Gambia) Lamin Jawneh	7	2	191	0	0	0	0
22	MF	(United States) Jacob Harris	2	1	105	0	0	0	0
24	MF	(United States) Josh Martinez	1	1	90	0	0	0	0
92	MF	(United States) Luke Schaefer	1	1	90	0	0	0	0
12	DF	(United States) Channing Chasten	5	1	76	0	0	0	0
23	MF	(Mexico) Jonathan Levin	3	1	62	0	0	0	0
94	DF	(United States) Blaize Hardy	1	0	31	0	0	1	0
93	MF	(United States) Zac Smith	1	0	31	0	0	0	0
95	FW	(United States) TJ Knight	1	0	23	0	0	0	0
91	MF	(United States) Kevin Mearse	1	0	23	0	0	0	0

- One Own Goal scored by Loudoun United FC & Orange County SC.

=== Goalkeepers ===
#	Name	GP	GS	Min.	SV	GA	GAA	SO	A yellow rectangle, denoting the yellow penalty card shown to a player being cautioned	A red rectangle, denoting the red penalty card shown to a player being sent off
39	(Germany) Ben Lundt	33	33	2970	115	51	1.545	9	4	0
26	(United States) Edward Delgado	1	1	90	3	7	7.000	0	0	0
