= List of Phoenix Rising FC seasons =

Since its inaugural season in 2014, the American soccer club Phoenix Rising FC has competed in the USL Championship, the second division of American soccer, previously known as USL and USL Pro. For its first three seasons, the club was known as Arizona United SC before its name change in 2017. The following is a complete list of seasons for the club, including team and individual statistics for all competitive competitions that the club has partaken in.

== Key ==
Key to competitions

- USL Championship (USLC) – The second division of soccer in the United States, established in 2010 and previously known as USL and USL Pro. The Championship was the third division of American soccer from its founding until its elevation to second division status in 2017.
- U.S. Open Cup (USOC) – The premier knockout cup competition in US soccer, first contested in 1914.
- CONCACAF Champions League (CCL) – The premier competition in North American soccer since 1962. It went by the name of Champions' Cup until 2008.

Key to colors and symbols

| 1st or W | Winners |
| 2nd or RU | Runners-up |
| Last | Wooden Spoon |
| ♦ | League Golden Boot |
| | Highest average attendance |

Key to league record

- Season = The year and article of the season
- Div = Level on pyramid
- League = League name
- Pld = Games played
- W = Games won
- L = Games lost
- D = Games drawn
- GF = Goals scored
- GA = Goals against
- Pts = Points
- PPG = Points per game
- Conf = Conference position
- Overall = League position

Key to cup record

- DNE = Did not enter
- DNQ = Did not qualify
- NH = Competition not held or canceled
- QR = Qualifying round
- PR = Preliminary round
- GS = Group stage
- R1 = First round
- R2 = Second round
- R3 = Third round
- R4 = Fourth round
- R5 = Fifth round
- QF = Quarterfinals
- SF = Semifinals
- RU = Runners-up
- W = Winners

== Seasons ==
| Season | Record | | | | | | | | | | | Position | | Playoffs | USOC | Continental / Other | Average attendance | Top goalscorer(s) | |
| Season | Div | League | Pld | W | L | D | GF | GA | GD | Pts | PPG | Conf. | Overall | Playoffs | USOC | Continental / Other | Average attendance | Name | Goals |
|---|---|---|---|---|---|---|---|---|---|---|---|---|---|---|---|---|---|---|---|
| 2014 | 3 | USL Pro | 28 | 10 | 13 | 5 | 32 | 47 | –15 | 33^{3} | 1.18 | N/A | 9th | DNQ | Ro32 | Ineligible | 2,395 | (China) Long Tan (Guatemala) Jonathan Top | 5 |
| 2015 | 3 | USL | 28 | 10 | 16 | 2 | 31 | 55 | –24 | 32 | 1.14 | 10th | 19th | DNQ | R2 | DNQ | 3,304 | (China) Long Tan | 14 |
| 2016 | 3 | USL | 30 | 9 | 14 | 7 | 40 | 46 | –6 | 34 | 1.13 | 13th | 21st | DNQ | R3 | DNQ | 1,470 | (China) Long Tan | 12 |
| 2017 | 2 | USL | 32 | 17 | 8 | 7 | 50 | 37 | +13 | 58 | 1.81 | 5th | 6th | R1 | R3 | DNQ | 6,127 | (Trinidad and Tobago) Jason Johnson | 13 |
| 2018 | 2 | USL | 34 | 19 | 9 | 6 | 63 | 38 | +25 | 63 | 1.85 | 3rd | 5th | RU | R2 | DNQ | 6,380 | (United States) Chris Cortez | 20 |
| 2019 | 2 | USLC | 34 | 24 | 4 | 6 | 89 | 36 | +53 | 78 | 2.30 | 1st | 1st | SF | R2 | DNQ | 6,752 | (Ghana) Solomon Asante | 22 ♦ |
| 2020 | 2 | USLC | 16 | 11 | 3 | 2 | 46 | 17 | +29 | 35 | 2.19 | 2nd | 2nd | F | NH | DNQ | 6,585 | (Jamaica) Junior Flemmings | 14 ♦ |
| 2021 | 2 | USLC | 32 | 20 | 5 | 7 | 68 | 35 | +33 | 67 | 2.09 | 1st | 2nd | QF | NH | DNQ | 6,996 | (Spain) Santi Moar | 16 |
| 2022 | 2 | USLC | 34 | 12 | 16 | 6 | 50 | 58 | -8 | 42 | 1.24 | 10th | 17th | DNQ | Ro32 | DNQ | 7,358 | (United States) Aodhan Quinn | 9 |
| 2023 | 2 | USLC | 34 | 12 | 10 | 12 | 54 | 41 | +13 | 48 | 1.41 | 6th | 12th | W | R3 | DNQ | 6,438 | (Mexico) Danny Trejo | 19 |
| 2024 | 2 | USLC | 34 | 11 | 14 | 9 | 33 | 39 | -6 | 42 | 1.24 | 8th | 19th | R1 | Ro16 | DNQ | 6,267 | (France) Rémi Cabral | 7 |
| 2025 | 2 | USLC | 30 | 9 | 13 | 8 | 48 | 48 | 0 | 40 | 1.33 | 5th | 12th | SF | Ro32 | DNQ | 4,868 | (France) Ihsan Sacko (England) Charlie Dennis | 7 |
| Total | – | – | 366 | 164 | 125 | 77 | 604 | 497 | +107 | 572 | 1.58 | – | – | – | – | – | – | (Ghana) Solomon Asante | 114 |

1. Avg. attendance only includes statistics from regular season matches.
2. Top goalscorer(s) includes all goals scored in the regular season, league playoffs, U.S. Open Cup, CONCACAF Champions League, FIFA Club World Cup, and other competitive continental matches.
3. Deducted two points for fielding an ineligible player.
