= 2025 Phoenix Rising FC season =

Phoenix Rising FC
2025 season
- Owners: List: Vincere Capital (Pablo Prichard) Berke Bakay Alex Zheng Tim Riester Mark Detmer Brett M. Johnson Didier Drogba Brandon McCarthy Diplo Pete Wentz David Rappaport Dave Stearns Rick Hauser William Kraus Kevin Kusatsu Mark Leber Jim Scussel Christopher Yeung
- Manager: Pa-Modou Kah
- Stadium: Phoenix Rising Soccer Stadium
- USL Championship: Conference: 5th Overall: 12th
- USLC Playoffs: TBD
- U.S. Open Cup: Fourth Round
- USL Cup: Group stage
- Top goalscorer: Hope Avayevu, Charlie Dennis, Ihsan Sacko (6 goals)
- Highest home attendance: 7,563 (October 17 vs San Antonio FC)
- Lowest home attendance: 3,757 (August 2 vs Birmingham Legion)
- Average home league attendance: 4,875
- Biggest win: 3-1 (June 7 vs Orange County SC)
- Biggest defeat: 4–1 (June 21 vs Charleston Battery)
Home colors	Away colors

The 2025 Phoenix Rising FC season is the club's 12th season in the USL Championship and their 9th with the name Phoenix Rising FC.

== Competitions ==
=== Friendlies ===
February 22, 2025 Friendly	Phoenix Rising FC	v	St. Louis City SC 2	Phoenix, Arizona
7:00 PM MST				Stadium: Phoenix Rising Soccer Stadium; Attendance: Season ticket holders only

February 28, 2025 Intrasquad; Scrimmage	Phoenix Rising FC Red	v	Phoenix Rising FC Black	Phoenix, Arizona
7:00 PM MST				Stadium: Phoenix Rising Soccer Stadium

=== USL Championship ===
Overall								Home						Away					
Pld	W	D	L	GF	GA	GD	Pts	W	D	L	GF	GA	GD	W	D	L	GF	GA	GD
19	6	6	7	30	36	−6	24	2	3	3	14	14	0	4	3	4	16	22	−6

Last updated: April 4, 2025.
Source: Match reports

==== Results by round ====
Round	1	2	3	4	5	6	7	8	9	10	11	12	13	14	15	16	17	18	19	20	21	22	23	24	25	26	27	28	29	30
Ground	H	A	H	A	A	H	H	A	A	H	A	H	A	A	H	A	A	H	A	A	H	H	H	A	H	H	H	A	H	A
Result	L	D	D	L	W	L	D	D	W	W	W	W	D	L	L	W	L	D	L	D	W	D	D	D	D	D	L	W	W	D
Position	10	9	9	10	10	11	10	11	9	7	6	5	4	6	7	5	5	4	7	8	6	5	5	7	7	7	8	6	5	5

First match(es) will be played on March 8, 2025. Source: Match reports
A = Away; H = Home; W = Win; D = Draw; L = Loss

==== Regular season matches ====
All times from this point on Mountain Standard Time (UTC-07:00)

March 8, 2025 1	Phoenix Rising FC	0–1	FC Tulsa	Phoenix, Arizona
7:00 PM MST	Formella (yellow card) 34'	Report	Dalou 25', (yellow card) 24'; Cissoko (yellow card) 66'	Stadium: Phoenix Rising Soccer Stadium; Attendance: 6,478; Referee: Elton Garcia

March 15, 2025 2	El Paso Locomotive FC	4–4	Phoenix Rising FC	El Paso, Texas
7:00 PM MST	Avila 6'; Moreno 34', 53'; Torres 4'; Diaz (yellow card) 58'; Ortiz (yellow card) 80'; Twumasi (yellow card) 80'; Daroma (yellow card) 90+2' (yellow-red card) 90+3'; Alfaro (yellow card) 90+5'	Report	Okello 45+3'; Cabral 69'; Sacko 80'; Traore 86'	Stadium: Southwest University Park; Attendance: 4,386; Referee: Calin Radosav

March 22, 2025 3	Phoenix Rising FC	2–2	Rhode Island FC	Phoenix, Arizona
7:00 PM MST	Rivera 40'; Avayevu 55'; Cuello (yellow card) 28'; Smith (yellow card) 46'; Boye (yellow card) 76'	Report	Williams 6'; Boye 43' (o.g.); Fuson (yellow card) 19'; Sanchez (yellow card) 48'	Stadium: Phoenix Rising Soccer Stadium; Attendance: 5,549; Referee: Alyssa Nichols

March 29, 2025 4	Monterey Bay FC	3–1	Phoenix Rising FC	Seaside, California
7:00 PM MST	Guzmán 3'; Rebollar 64'; Søjberg 73', (yellow card) 55'; Lyons (yellow card) 15'; Gnaulati (yellow card) 40'	Report	Cabral 17'; Okello (yellow card) 2'; Margaritha (yellow card) 21'; Boye (yellow card) 26' (yellow-red card) 62'; Neville (yellow card) 43'; Sainté (red card); Ping (yellow card) 89'	Stadium: Cardinale Stadium; Attendance: 3,210; Referee: Brandon Stevis

April 6, 2025 5	San Antonio FC	1–2	Phoenix Rising	San Antonio, Texas
	Hernandez 65', (yellow card) 90+6'; Blanco (yellow card) 79'; Crognale (yellow card) 83'	Report	Okello (yellow card) 38'; Cabral 65'; Henry (yellow card) 64'; Margaritha 67'	Stadium: Toyota Field; Attendance: 7,498; Referee: Greg Dopka

April 12, 2025 6	Phoenix Rising FC	2–3	Detroit City FC	Phoenix, Arizona
7:30 PM MST	Smith 42'; Avayevu 71'; Smith (yellow card) 15'; Margaritha (yellow card) 50'	Report	Smith 87,89'; Cedeno 90'; Rh. Williams (yellow card) 11'	Stadium: Phoenix Rising Soccer Stadium; Attendance: 4,861; Referee: Natalie Simon

April 19, 2025 7	Phoenix Rising FC	2-2	Sacramento Republic FC	Phoenix, Arizona
1:00 PM MST	Margaritha 37'; Rivera 78'	Report	Herrera 18'; Wanner 34'	Stadium: Phoenix Rising Soccer Stadium; Attendance: 4,423; Referee: Nabil Bensalah

May 3, 2025 8	Colorado Springs Switchbacks	1-1	Phoenix Rising FC	Colorado Springs, Colorado
				Stadium: Weidner Field

May 10, 2025 9	New Mexico United	1-2	Phoenix Rising FC	Albuquerque, New Mexico
				Stadium: Rio Grande Credit Union Field at Isotopes Park

May 17, 2025 10	Phoenix Rising FC	2-0	Monterey Bay FC	Phoenix, Arizona
7:30 PM MST				Stadium: Phoenix Rising Soccer Stadium

May 28, 2025 11	Las Vegas Lights FC	0-1	Phoenix Rising FC	Las Vegas, Nevada
				Stadium: Cashman Field

June 7, 2025 12	Phoenix Rising FC	3-1	Orange County SC	Phoenix, Arizona
8:00 PM MST				Stadium: Phoenix Rising Soccer Stadium

June 14, 2025 13	FC Tulsa	1-1	Phoenix Rising FC	Tulsa, Oklahoma
				Stadium: Oneok Field

June 21, 2025 14	Charleston Battery	4–1	Phoenix Rising FC	Mount Pleasant, South Carolina
	Myers 8'; Rodriguez 44', 77'; Landry 88'	Report	Avayevu 36'	Stadium: Patriots Point Soccer Complex; Attendance: 5,080; Referee: Luis Arroyo

July 4, 2025 15	Phoenix Rising FC	0-1	Lexington SC	Phoenix, Arizona
7:30 PM MST				Stadium: Phoenix Rising Soccer Stadium

July 12, 2025 16	Oakland Roots SC	1-2	Phoenix Rising FC	Oakland, California
				Stadium: Oakland Coliseum

July 30, 2025 17	Orange County SC	4-1	Phoenix Rising FC	Irvine, California
	Sacko 68'; Boye (red card)	Report	Zubak 30'; Doghman 58'; Jamison 72'; Guimaraes 89'	Stadium: Championship Soccer Stadium; Attendance: 3,536; Referee: Brandon Stevis

August 2, 2025 18	Phoenix Rising FC	3–3	Birmingham Legion FC	Phoenix, Arizona
	Cuello 16'; Avayevu 25'; Dennis 90'	Report	Pasher 39'; Tregarthen 54'; Martínez 64'	Stadium: Phoenix Rising Soccer Stadium; Attendance: 3,757; Referee: John Matto

August 9, 2025 19	Lexington SC	2–0	Phoenix Rising FC	Lexington, Kentucky
	Ajago 29'; Adedokun 79'	Report		Stadium: Lexington SC Stadium; Attendance: 4,233; Referee: Alyssa Pennington

August 16, 2025 20	Tampa Bay Rowdies	1–1	Phoenix Rising FC	St. Petersburg, Florida
	Arteaga 75'	Report	Rizzo 73'	Stadium: Al Lang Stadium; Attendance: 4,547; Referee: Muhammad Hassan

August 23, 2025 21	Phoenix Rising FC	4–1	Colorado Springs Switchbacks	Phoenix, Arizona
8:00 PM MST	Cabral 6'; Rizzo 11'; Avayevu 26'; Flood 78'	Report	Zandi 16'	Stadium: Phoenix Rising Soccer Stadium; Attendance: 4,118; Referee: Thomas Snyder

August 30, 2025 22	Phoenix Rising FC	3–3	El Paso Locomotive FC	Phoenix, Arizona
4:30 PM MST	Sacko 7', 47'; Essengue (yellow card) 25' (yellow-red card) 63'; Johnson 53'	Report	Moreno 73'; Torres 81'; Ruiz 90'+8'	Stadium: Phoenix Rising Soccer Stadium; Attendance: 4,030; Referee: Muhammad Kaleia

September 5, 2025 23	Phoenix Rising FC	0–0	Las Vegas Lights FC	Phoenix, Arizona
8:00 PM MST		Report		Stadium: Phoenix Rising Soccer Stadium; Attendance: 4,158; Referee: Cristian Campo Hernández

September 13, 2025 24	Sacramento Republic FC	2–2	Phoenix Rising FC	Sacramento, California
7:00 PM	Cicerone 20'; Okello 32' (o.g.); Bennett (yellow card) 52' (yellow-red card) 75'	Report	Cabral 59' (pen.); Sacko 79'	Stadium: Heart Health Park; Attendance: 11,569; Referee: Trevor Wiseman

September 20, 2025 25	Phoenix Rising FC	2–2	Loudoun United FC	Phoenix, Arizona
7:30 PM MST	Leerman 80' (o.g.); Sainté 90'+10'	Report	Valot 9'; Mines 45'+9'	Stadium: Phoenix Rising Soccer Stadium; Attendance: 4,715; Referee: Rodrigo Albuquerque

September 27, 2025 26	Phoenix Rising FC	3–3	Oakland Roots SC	Phoenix, Arizona
7:00 PM MST	Dennis 45', 86'; Flores (yellow card) 89' (yellow-red card) 90'+4'; Cabral 90'+7' (pen.)	Report	Trejo 1'; Wilson 9', 22'; Margvelashvili (red card) 90'+4'	Stadium: Phoenix Rising Soccer Stadium; Attendance: 4,999; Referee: Elvis Osmanovic

October 4, 2025 27	Phoenix Rising FC	0–1	New Mexico United	Phoenix, Arizona
7:30 PM MST		Report	Maples 90'+7' (pen.)	Stadium: Phoenix Rising Soccer Stadium; Attendance: 5,323; Referee: Atahan Yaya

October 10, 2025 28	North Carolina FC	0–2	Phoenix Rising FC	Cary, North Carolina
4:00 PM MST		Report	Dennis 35'; Smith 61'	Stadium: WakeMed Soccer Park; Attendance: 2,526; Referee: Elton García

October 18, 2025 29	Phoenix Rising FC	1–0	San Antonio FC	Phoenix, Arizona
7:30 PM MST	Dennis 11'	Report		Stadium: Phoenix Rising Soccer Stadium; Attendance: 7,563; Referee: Brad Jensen

October 25, 2025 30	Pittsburgh Riverhounds SC	0–0	Phoenix Rising FC	Pittsburgh, Pennsylvania
4:00 PM MST		Report		Stadium: Highmark Stadium; Attendance: 5,067; Referee: Matthew Corrigan

==== Group table ====
Pos	Team	Pld	W	L	T	GF	GA	GD	Pts	Qualification
3	New Mexico United	30	14	10	6	45	41	+4	48 (Note: Sacramento Republic FC are ahead of New Mexico United on head-to-head points: SAC 6, NMU 0.)	Playoffs
4	El Paso Locomotive FC	30	10	9	11	47	45	+2	41	Playoffs
5	Phoenix Rising FC	30	9	8	13	48	48	0	40 (Note: Phoenix Rising FC are ahead of San Antonio FC on head-to-head points: PHX 6, SAN 0.)	Playoffs
6	San Antonio FC	30	11	12	7	39	38	+1	40	Playoffs
7	Orange County SC	30	10	11	9	44	45	−1	39	Playoffs

Source: USL Championship Standings
Rules for classification: 1) head-to-head points; 2) head-to-head goal differential; 3) points-per-game within conference; 4) total wins; 5) total goal differential; 6) total goals scored; 7) points earned against top four Conference finishers; 8) disciplinary points; 9) coin toss or drawing of lots

==== USL Championship playoffs ====
By placing fifth in the Western Conference, Phoenix qualified for the 2025 USL Championship playoffs, being matched up away against the fourth seeded El Paso Locomotive FC.

November 1, 2025 West	El Paso Locomotive FC	0–1	Phoenix Rising FC	El Paso, Texas
7:30 PM MT	Daroma (red card) 73'	Report	Scearce (yellow card) 74'; Dennis 86' (pen.) (yellow card) 87'; Sacko (yellow card) 90'; Cabral (yellow card) 90+1'	Stadium: Southwest University Park; Attendance: 3,469; Referee: Jeremy Scheer

November 8, 2025 West	FC Tulsa	1–0	Phoenix Rising FC	Tulsa, Oklahoma
8:00 PM ET	Batista (yellow card) 67'; Stauffer (yellow card) 88'; St Clair (yellow card) 90+1'; Lukic 120+2' (yellow card) 120+4'	Report	Moursou (yellow card) 32'; Scearce (yellow card) 44'; Johnson (yellow card) 67'; Okello (yellow card) 113'	Stadium: ONEOK Field; Attendance: 7,917; Referee: Brandon Stevis

=== USL Jägermeister Cup ===
April 26, 2025	Phoenix Rising FC	0-1	San Antonio FC	Phoenix, Arizona
7:30 PM MST				Stadium: Phoenix Rising Soccer Stadium

May 31, 2025	Phoenix Rising FC	3–3 (3–2 p)	New Mexico United	Phoenix, Arizona
7:00 PM MST	Sacko 40' (pen.); Avayevu 45+2'; Scearce 70'	Report	Akale 14'; Fernando 57'; Gaines 63'	Stadium: Phoenix Rising Soccer Stadium; Attendance: 4,122; Referee: John Griggs
	Penalties
	Scearce (penalty scored); Dennis (penalty scored); Formella (penalty missed); Margaritha (penalty missed); Sacko (penalty scored)		(penalty missed) Bruce; (penalty missed) Maples; (penalty missed) Pondeca; (penalty scored) Seymore; (penalty scored) Ryden

June 28, 2025	Texoma FC	4–5	Phoenix Rising FC	Sherman, Texas
7:30 PM CDT	McManus 7'; Pepi 26', 41'; Jawneh 68'	Report	Dennis 21' (pen.), 52', 71' (pen.); Johnson 24'; Cuello 90+6'	Stadium: Sherman Bearcat Stadium; Attendance: 1,045; Referee: Corbyn May

July 19, 2025	El Paso Locomotive FC	2-2	Phoenix Rising FC	El Paso, Texas
	2		2	Stadium: Southwest University Park

=== Group 2 table ===
Pos	Lg	Team	Pld	W	PKW	PKL	L	GF	GA	GD	Pts	Qualification
1	USLC	San Antonio FC	4	3	0	1	0	6	2	+4	10	Advance to knockout stage
2	USLC	New Mexico United	4	1	2	1	0	9	7	+2	8	
3	USLC	Colorado Springs Switchbacks FC	4	2	0	1	1	7	4	+3	7	
4	USLC	Phoenix Rising FC	4	1	2	0	1	10	10	0	7	
5	USLC	El Paso Locomotive FC	4	1	1	1	1	3	3	0	6	
6	USL1	Union Omaha	4	1	0	0	3	3	5	−2	3	
7	USL1	Texoma FC	4	0	0	1	3	5	12	−7	1	

Updated to match(es) played on July 26, 2025. Source: USL

== Roster ==
No.	Name	Nationality	Position(s)	Date of birth (age)	Signed in	Previous club
Goalkeepers
1	Patrick Rakovsky	(Germany)	GK	June 2, 1993 (age 32)	2023	(United States) Orange County SC
13	Triston Henry	(Canada)	GK	September 8, 1993 (age 32)	2025	(United States) Memphis 901 FC
Defenders
2	Collin Smith	(United States)	DF	December 4, 2003 (age 22)	2025	(United States) Rhode Island FC
3	Harvey Neville	(Republic of Ireland)	DF	June 26, 2002 (age 23)	2025	(United States) Portland Timbers 2
4	Pape Mar Boye	(Senegal)	DF	December 30, 2003 (age 22)	2024	(United States) Clemson University
5	Mohamed Traore	(Senegal)	DF	August 15, 2002 (age 23)	2024	(United States) Los Angeles FC
15	Alejandro Araneda	(United States)	DF	January 20, 2003 (age 23)	2025	(United States) North Texas SC
23	Ryan Flood	(United States)	DF	October 17, 1998 (age 27)	2024	(Republic of Ireland) Finn Harps
Midfielders
6	Noble Okello	(Canada)	MF	July 20, 2000 (age 25)	2025	(United States) Atlanta United 2
10	Hope Avayevu	(Ghana)	MF	October 19, 2002 (age 23)	2025	(United States) Ventura County FC
12	Charlie Dennis	(England)	MF	September 28, 1995 (age 30)	2024	(United States) Tampa Bay Rowdies
14	Emil Cuello	(Argentina)	MF	January 2, 1997 (age 29)	2023	(United States) Sacramento Republic FC
17	JP Scearce	(United States)	MF	December 19, 1997 (age 28)	2023	(United States) Union Omaha
18	Carl Sainté	(Haiti)	MF	August 9, 2002 (age 23)	2025	(United States) FC Dallas (loan)
70	Giulio Doratiotto	(Italy)	MF	May 18, 2004 (age 21)	2024	(Italy) Juventus Next Gen
Forwards
9	Ihsan Sacko	(France)	FW	July 19, 1997 (age 28)	2025	(Switzerland) FC Thun
19	Damian Rivera	(Costa Rica)	FW	December 8, 2002 (age 23)	2025	(United States) New England Revolution II
29	Dariusz Formella	(Poland)	FW	October 21, 1995 (age 30)	2023	(United States) Oakland Roots SC
38	Darius Johnson	(Grenada)	FW	March 15, 2000 (age 26)	2024	(Netherlands) FC Volendam
71	Jearl Margaritha	(Curaçao)	FW	April 10, 2000 (age 25)	2024	(Azerbaijan) Sabah FC
91	Rémi Cabral	(France)	FW	July 10, 1999 (age 26)	2025	(United States) Colorado Rapids 2

USL Academy contract.

== Player transactions ==
=== Loan in ===
Start date	End date	Position	No.	Player	From club	Ref.
January 3, 2025	End of Season	Midfielder	18	(Haiti) Carl Sainte	(United States) FC Dallas	

=== Loan out ===
Start date	End date	Position	No.	Player	To club	Ref.
January 14, 2025	Until recalled	Defender	72	(Venezuela) Edgardo Rito	(Venezuela) Caracas FC	

=== Transfer out ===
Date	Position	No.	Player	To club	Ref.
January 8, 2025	Defender	13	(Brazil) Gabriel Torres	El Paso Locomotive FC	
