= Phoenix Rising Soccer Complex at Wild Horse Pass =

Soccer stadium near Phoenix, Arizona

Wild Horse Pass Stadium
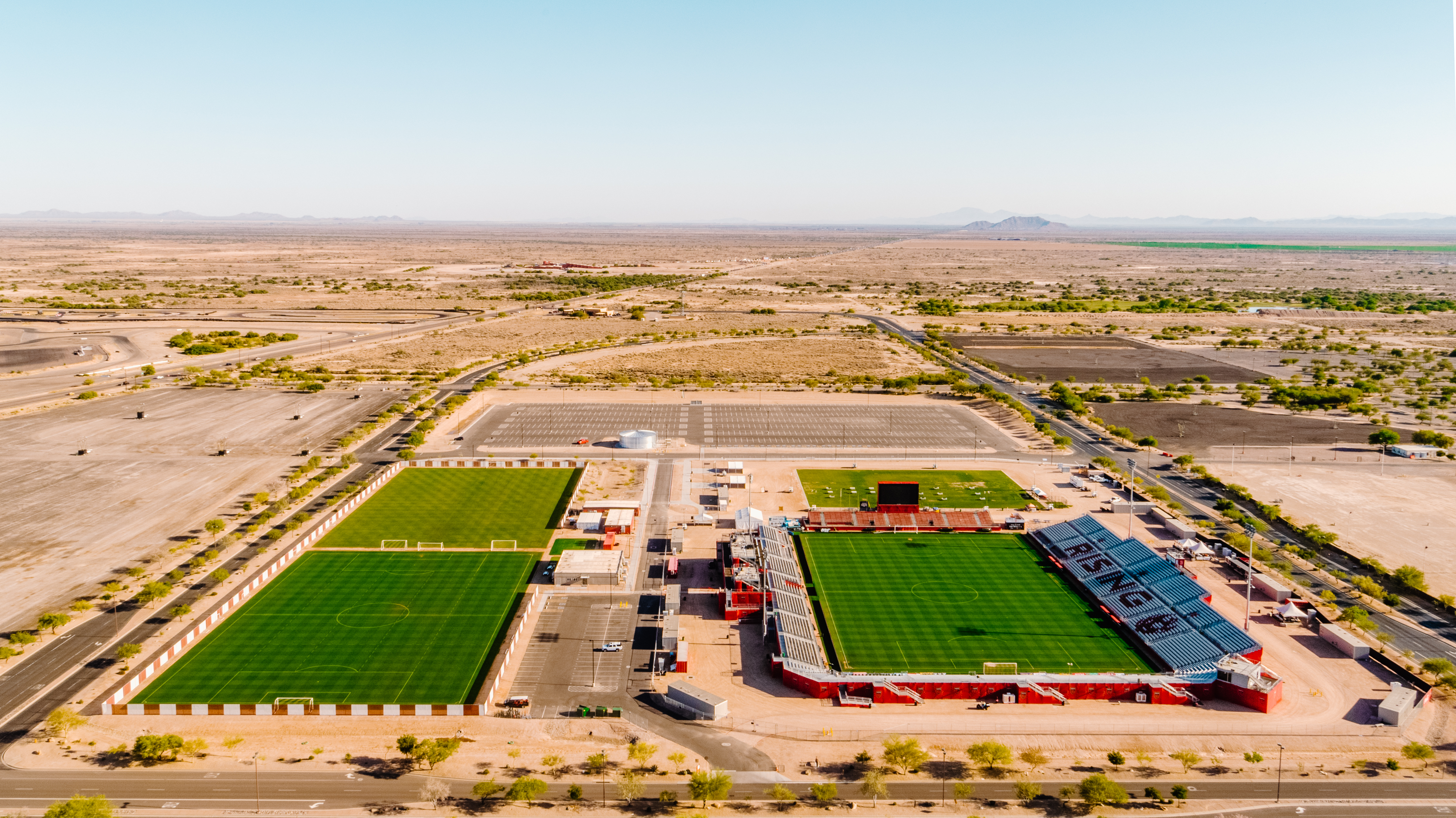
- Interactive map of Wild Horse Pass Stadium
- Address: 19593 S. 48th St. Chandler, Arizona 85226
- Coordinates: 33°16′15″N 111°58′35″W
- Owner: Phoenix Rising FC
- Capacity: 10,000
- Executive suites: 15
- Surface: Grass
- Record attendance: 9,236 (October 23, 2021 vs. Sacramento Republic FC)
- Field size: 116 yd × 74 yd (106 m × 68 m)

Construction
- Groundbreaking: September 2020
- Opened: April 30, 2021
- Architect: Odell Associates
- General contractor: Willmeng Construction

Tenant
- Phoenix Rising FC (USLC) (2021–2022)

Phoenix Rising Soccer Complex at Wild Horse Pass is a soccer complex including the Wild Horse Pass Stadium, a soccer-specific stadium near Chandler, Arizona. It is the former home of Phoenix Rising FC of the USL Championship. The stadium was completed before the start of the 2021 USL Championship season.

It is located on land in the Gila River Indian Community, near Interstate 10 and Loop 202, across the Wild Horse Pass Motorsports Park. The complex has 10,000 seats with a video board, press box, improved sound, a family-friendly general admission section, ticket office, locker rooms, two practice fields, and a on-site administrative office.

== Background ==
During planning for a permanent stadium, Phoenix Rising considered sites in Mesa, Phoenix, Salt River Pima-Maricopa Indian Community, Scottsdale and Tempe.

== History ==
The first Phoenix Rising game at the complex was held on April 30, 2021, when Rising defeated San Diego Loyal SC 4–1. Jon Bakero scored the first goal on the 39th minute, followed by Santi Moar, Aodhan Quinn and Kevon Lambert. The last game Phoenix Rising at Wild Horse Pass was on October 15, 2022, with Rising coming out on top 3–1 over Atlanta United 2. The final goal was scored in the 80th minute by Jackson Conway for Atlanta.
