= Manuel Madrid =

Mexican footballer (born 1993)

Personal information
- Full name: Manuel Madrid Quezada
- Date of birth: 29 August 1993 (age 33)
- Place of birth: Chihuahua City, Mexico
- Height: 1.90 m (6 ft 3 in)
- Position: Defender

Youth career
- 2010–2012: Real Cuautitlán

Senior career*
Years	Team	Apps	(Gls)
2013–2016	Cruz Azul	2	(0)
2016–2017	→ UdeC (loan)	31	(1)
2017–2019	UdeG	42	(4)
2019–2020	Tampico Madero	17	(1)
2020–2021	Zacatecas	24	(2)
2021–2022	Phoenix Rising	22	(1)
2023	Chattanooga Red Wolves	15	(0)
- * Club domestic league appearances and goals as of 22:22, 16 October 2023 (UTC)

Manuel Madrid Quezada (born 29 August 1993), known as Kaiser de Chihuahua, is a Mexican professional footballer who plays as a defender.

== Club career ==
=== Phoenix Rising FC ===
Madrid signed with Phoenix Rising FC on July 15, 2021.

=== Chattanooga Red Wolves ===
On 1 February 2023, Madrid signed with USL League One side Chattanooga Red Wolves.
