= Darius Johnson (footballer) =

English-Grenadian footballer (born 2000)

Personal information
- Date of birth: 15 March 2000 (age 26)
- Place of birth: Chelsea, England
- Height: 1.82 m (6 ft 0 in)
- Positions: Forward; winger

Team information
- Current team: San Jose Earthquakes
- Number: 79

Youth career
- 2018: The Harrow Club

Senior career*
Years	Team	Apps	(Gls)
2018–2019	Rising Ballers Kensington		
2019	Kensington & Ealing Borough	5	
2019–2024	Volendam	51	(2)
2019–2023	Jong Volendam	34	(7)
2024–2026	Phoenix Rising	38	(2)
2026–	San Jose Earthquakes	1	(0)
2026–	San Jose Earthquakes II	0	(0)

International career^{‡}
2023–	Grenada	14	(2)
- * Club domestic league appearances and goals as of 09:08, 24 May 2026 (UTC) ‡ National team caps and goals as of 21:11, 19 October 2025 (UTC)

Darius Johnson (born 15 March 2000) is a professional footballer who plays as a forward for San Jose Earthquakes in Major League Soccer. Born in England, he plays for the Grenada national team.

== Club career ==
As a youngster, Johnson had various internships and trials with football clubs, firstly with Queens Park Rangers before heading off to the likes of Tottenham Hotspur, Crawley Town and Oxford United, but failed to secure permanent terms. After a subsequent break from football, Johnson returned at the age of seventeen to play for The Harrow Club at youth level. During his time with them, Johnson played in a friendly against YouTube team Rising Ballers; who subsequently signed the forward. He would eventually leave the club, prior to joining Combined Counties Football League side Kensington & Ealing Borough.

After making five appearances for the semi-professional outfit, Johnson joined Chelsea on trial. He earned the possibility of a contract after featuring in Premier League 2 against Brighton & Hove Albion, but was unable to sign due to Chelsea's ongoing transfer ban. Johnson secured a trial with Dutch team FC Volendam in mid-2019. He was given a professional deal soon after, having appeared in an exhibition match versus VPV Purmersteijn. He made his pro debut on 23 August 2019 during a 3–0 loss away to De Graafschap, as he came off the bench to replace Nick Doodeman after seventy-nine minutes.

Johnson scored his first FC Volendam league goal on 13 September, netting in a home draw against FC Dordrecht.

His contract with Volendam ended in the summer of 2022 but he reappeared for the club's second team in October 2022 playing in the Tweede Divisie. He also appeared as a late substitute in the last two games of the season for the first team, which meant his debut in the Dutch Eredivisie.

Johnson signed with Phoenix Rising FC of the USL Championship on August 22, 2024.

On 19 May 2026, Phoenix Rising announced they had agreed to transfer Johnson to Major League Soccer side San Jose Earthquakes with Johnson subsequently agreeing to a season long contract with the latter.

== International career ==
Born in England, Johnson is of Grenadian descent. He was called up to the Grenada national team for a set of 2023–24 CONCACAF Nations League matches in September 2023.

== Career statistics ==
As of 18 June 2024.

Appearances and goals by club, season and competition
Club	Season	League			Cup		Continental		Other		Total	
Club	Season	Division	Apps	Goals	Apps	Goals	Apps	Goals	Apps	Goals	Apps	Goals
FC Volendam	2019–20	Eerste Divisie	13	1	1	0	—		0	0	14	1
FC Volendam	2020–21	Eerste Divisie	8	0	1	0	—		0	0	9	0
FC Volendam	2021–22	Eerste Divisie	0	0	0	0	—		0	0	0	0
FC Volendam	2022–23	Eredivisie	2	0	0	0	—		0	0	2	0
FC Volendam	2023–24	Eredivisie	25	1	1	0	—		0	0	26	1
Career total			48	2	3	0	—		0	0	51	2
