= Luis Manuel Seijas =

Venezuelan footballer (born 1986)

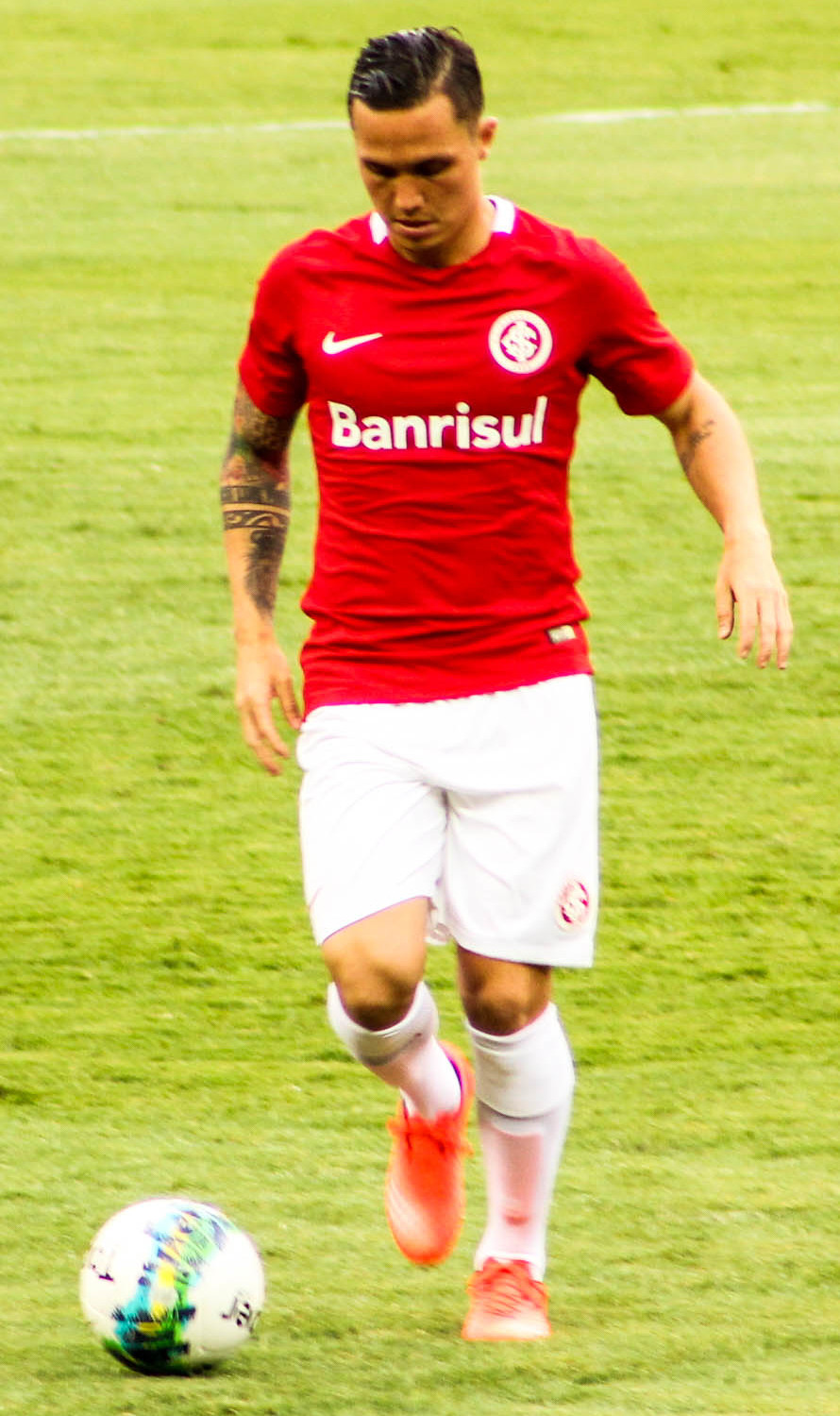
- Seijas with Internacional in 2017

Personal information
- Full name: Luis Manuel de Jesus Perez
- Date of birth: 23 June 1986 (age 40)
- Place of birth: Valencia, Venezuela
- Height: 1.74 m (5 ft 9 in)
- Position: Midfielder

Youth career
- Caracas

Senior career*
Years	Team	Apps	(Gls)
2004–2006	Caracas	10	(2)
2006–2007	Banfield	4	(0)
2007–2008	Deportivo Táchira	16	(4)
2008–2011	Santa Fe	103	(14)
2011–2013	Standard Liège	46	(8)
2013	Deportivo Quito	6	(0)
2014–2016	Santa Fe	70	(13)
2016–2018	Internacional	23	(4)
2017–2018	→ Chapecoense (loan)	18	(0)
2018–2021	Santa Fe	57	(4)
2021–2022	Phoenix Rising	36	(8)

International career^{‡}
2006–2019	Venezuela	69	(2)
- * Club domestic league appearances and goals as of 20:54, 23 October 2022 (UTC) ‡ National team caps and goals as of 17:51, 10 June 2019 (UTC)

Luis Manuel Seijas Gunther (born 23 June 1986) is a Venezuelan retired footballer who played as a midfielder.

== Club career ==
After a successful run with the Venezuelan youth squads Seijas was taken to Banfield in Argentina and later made a big impact in his home country with Deportivo Táchira and later was taken to Santa Fe that was looking to rebuild their team after finishing last in the Colombian league.

Seijas signed a three-year contract with Belgian giants Standard de Liège on 30 August 2011 after a very successful time spent with Santa Fe. On 2 May 2013 he broke his contract with Standard de Liège and he left the club.

On 16 July 2013, Seijas came to Terms with Ecuadorian Club, Deportivo Quito. He rejoined Santa Fe in 2014, and was part of the squad that won the 2015 Copa Sudamericana.

On 23 May 2016 Seijas arrived in Porto Alegre to sign and join Internacional. Seijas signed with Phoenix Rising FC on 8 September 2021.

== Club statistics ==
As of 29 May 2016

Club	Season	League		Cup		Continental		Total	
Club	Season	Apps	Goals	Apps	Goals	Apps	Goals	Apps	Goals
Banfield	2005–06	0	0	0	0	0	0	0	0
Banfield	2006–07	4	0	0	0	0	0	4	0
Banfield	Total	4	0	0	0	0	0	4	0
Deportivo Táchira	2007–08	16	4			0	0	16	4
Deportivo Táchira	Total	16	4			0	0	16	4
Santa Fe	2008	40	5			0	0	40	5
Santa Fe	2009	24	3			0	0	24	3
Santa Fe	2010	25	5			5	1	30	6
Santa Fe	2011	13	1	2	0	1	0	16	1
Santa Fe	Total	103	14	2	0	6	1	111	15
Standard Liège	2011–12	28	4	4	1	8	2	40	7
Standard Liège	2012–13	18	3	0	0	0	0	18	3
Standard Liège	Total	46	7	4	1	8	2	58	10
Deportivo Quito	2013	6	0	0	0	0	0	6	0
Deportivo Quito	Total	6	0	0	0	0	0	6	0
Santa Fe	2014	35	3	8	1	4	0	47	4
Santa Fe	2015	21	3	7	1	17	1	45	5
Santa Fe	2016	14	7	0	0	8	0	22	7
Santa Fe	Total	70	13	15	2	29	1	114	16
Career totals		245	38	21	3	43	4	309	45

== International career ==
Seijas has made 51 appearances for the senior Venezuela national football team since his debut in 2006.

=== International goals ===
No.	Date	Venue	Opponent	Score	Result	Competition	Ref.
1.	23 May 2012	Polideportivo Cachamay, Puerto Ordaz, Venezuela	Moldova	1–0	4–0	Friendly	
2.	11 October 2013	Pueblo Nuevo, San Cristóbal, Venezuela	Paraguay	1–1	1–1	2014 FIFA World Cup qualification	

== Honours ==
=== Club ===
Santa Fe

- Copa Colombia: 2009
- Categoria Primera A: 2014
- Copa Sudamericana: 2015
