= Phoenix Rising Soccer Stadium =

Soccer stadium in Phoenix, Arizona

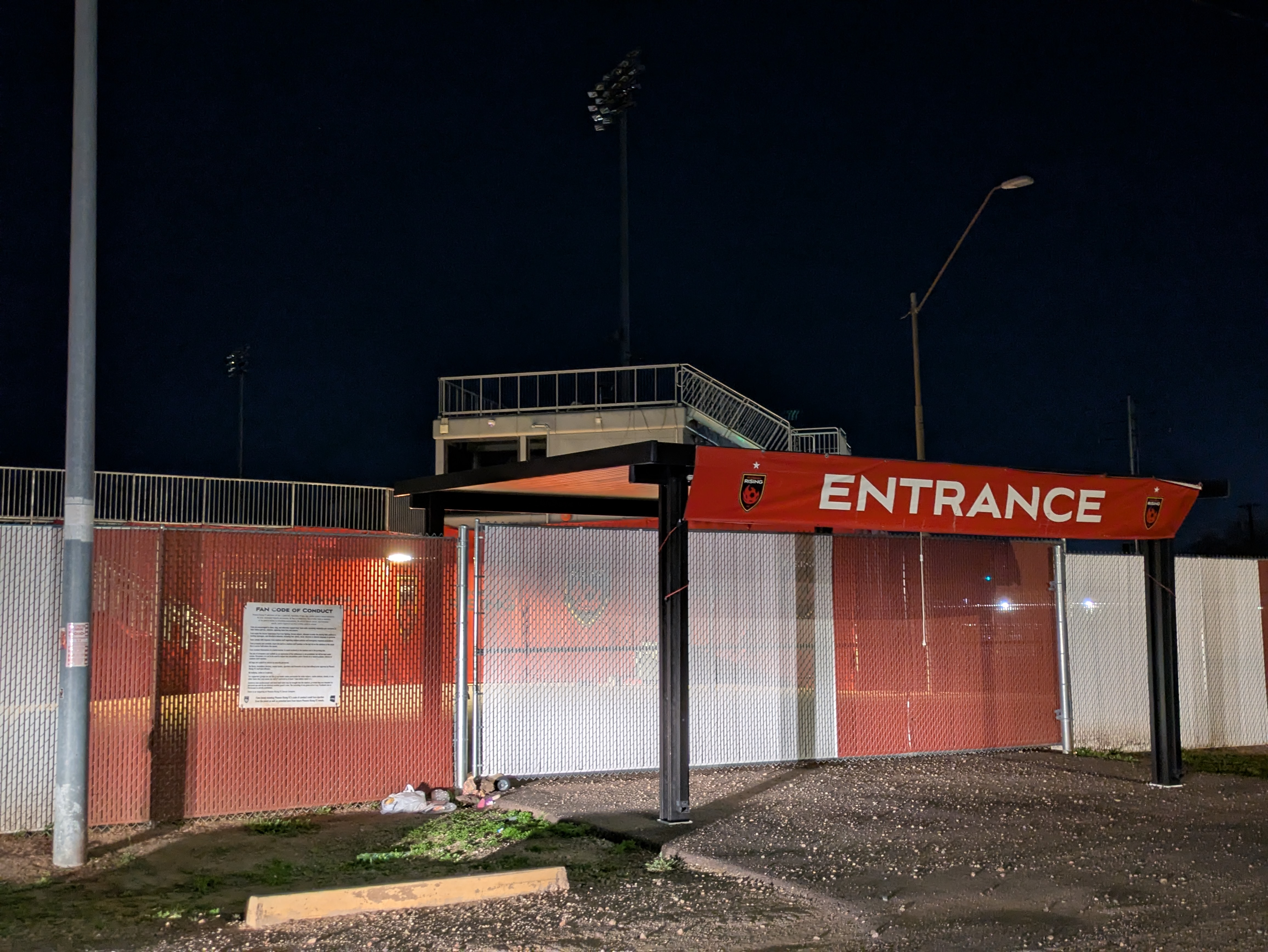
- Northern Entrance of the stadium in January 2026
- Interactive map of Phoenix Rising Soccer Stadium
- Address: 3801 E Washington St; Phoenix, AZ 85034
- Coordinates: 33°26′43″N 112°00′7″W
- Owner: Phoenix Rising FC
- Capacity: 10,000
- Executive suites: 1 + Premium Terrace
- Surface: Grass
- Record attendance: 10,437 (April 1, 2023 vs. San Diego Loyal SC)
- Field size: 116 yd × 74 yd (106 m × 68 m)
- Public transit: 38th Street/Washington; Valley Metro Bus: 1

Construction
- Opened: April 1, 2023
- Architect: Odell Associates

Tenants
- Phoenix Rising FC (USLC) (2023–present); USL Super League Phoenix (USLS) (future)

Phoenix Rising Soccer Stadium is a soccer-specific stadium in Phoenix, Arizona. It is the home of Phoenix Rising FC of the USL Championship. The stadium was completed on April 1, 2023. The stadium replaces Phoenix Rising's previous home, built on land in the Gila River Indian Community near I-10 and Loop 202.

== History ==
After the 2022 season, Rising FC signed a lease agreement with the City of Phoenix to rebuild the stadium (which is modular in design) to an area north of Phoenix Sky Harbor International Airport. The club's previous home, Phoenix Rising Soccer Complex at Wild Horse Pass, was located inside the Gila River Indian Community near Chandler, and the tribal government at the time did not allow fans to place wagers on site, not even on mobile apps, due to sports-betting restrictions on its land.

The first game at the new stadium was played on April 1, 2023 against San Diego Loyal SC. It drew a club record 10,437 fans.
