= Richmond Antwi =

Ghanaian footballer

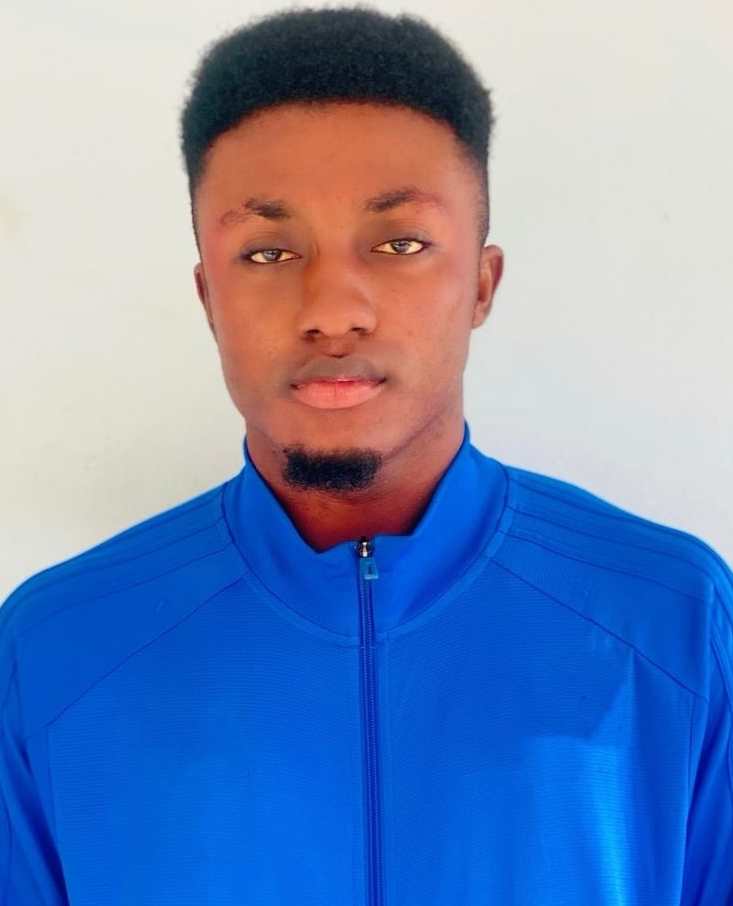

Personal information
- Date of birth: 7 August 2000 (age 26)
- Place of birth: Kumasi, Ghana
- Height: 1.80 m (5 ft 11 in)
- Position: Forward

Youth career
- 2017–2018: Tema Stars Youth

Senior career*
Years	Team	Apps	(Gls)
2018–2019	Al Khartoum	20	(11)
2020	Al-Merrikh	14	(7)
2021	Legon Cities	13	(1)
2022	Phoenix Rising	21	(4)
- * Club domestic league appearances and goals as of 21 October 2022

Richmond Antwi (born 7 August 2000) is a Ghanaian footballer who last played as a forward for USL Championship side Phoenix Rising FC.

== Club career ==
=== Early career ===
Richmond began his football career with a youth club Tema Sports Youth in Tema. Richmond later moved to Al Khartoum FC in Sudan. He stayed at Al Khartoum FC for a season, played a lot of games and won the league goal king for the 2018–2019 season. Richmond got huge attention nationwide because of his outstanding performance. Richmond helped Al Khartoum FC to finish 3rd on the league table and later joined Al-Merrikh SC.

=== Al-Merrikh ===
In January 2020, Richmond was transferred to Sudan Premier League club Al-Merrikh SC on a deal to end the season. He tallied 7 goals in 14 league matches, emerging as one of the top front men in the league as Al-Merrikh clinched a league title.

=== Legon Cities ===
In February 2021, Richmond signed for Legon Cities FC.

=== Phoenix Rising ===
Antwi joined Phoenix Rising FC of the USL Championship in December 2021. Antwi led Phoenix Rising in goals per minutes played, however his contract option for 2023 was declined at the conclusion of the 2022 season.

== Career statistics ==
=== Club ===
As of 10 July 2021

Club	League		Cup		Continental		Total	
Club	Apps	Goals	Apps	Goals	Apps	Goals	Apps	Goals
Al Khartoum FC	20	11	4	6	0	0	24	17
Al-Merrickh SC	14	7	0	0	0	0	14	7
Legon Cities FC	9	1	1	2	0	0	10	3
Career total	43	19	5	8	0	0	45	27

== Honours ==
Al-Merrikh

- Sudan Premier League winner: 2019-2020

Individual

- Sudan Premier League Top Goalscorer: 2018-2019 season
