= Ryan Flood =

American soccer player (born 1998)

Personal information
- Date of birth: October 17, 1998 (age 28)
- Place of birth: Scottsdale, Arizona, United States
- Height: 6 ft 2 in (1.88 m)
- Position: Left back

Team information
- Current team: Asheville City SC
- Number: 7

Youth career
- SC del Sol
- Sereno Soccer Club
- Real Salt Lake AZ
- Corona del Sol HS

Senior career*
| Years | Team | Apps | (Gls) |
| 2018 | Sporting Arizona | | |
| 2019–2020 | FC Arizona | 14 | (3) |
| 2021–2022 | Phoenix Rising | 36 | (1) |
| 2023–2024 | Finn Harps | 34 | (12) |
| 2024–2025 | Phoenix Rising | 23 | (2) |
| 2024 | → Orange County SC (loan) | 16 | (2) |
- * Club domestic league appearances and goals as of February 28, 2026

Ryan Flood (born October 17, 1998) is an American professional soccer player who currently plays as a left-back for Asheville City SC.

== Career ==
After a season in the UPSL with Sporting Arizona in 2018, Flood traveled to Brazil and Japan in pursuit of a professional soccer career. He returned in 2019 to play in the NPSL with FC Arizona.

On March 31, 2021, Flood signed his first fully professional contract with USL Championship side Phoenix Rising. He made his professional debut on April 30, 2021, starting in a 4–1 win over San Diego Loyal.

In January 2022, Flood was re-signed by the club for another season, as his option was activated.

On January 12, 2023, Flood joined Irish club Finn Harps on a permanent deal, signing a two-year contract in the process. On 15 February 2024, it was announced by Finn Harps that Flood had returned to America on compassionate leave for an undetermined amount of time.

On 14 March 2024, it was announced that Flood had signed for his former club Phoenix Rising.

Flood was loaned to Orange County SC on May 31, 2024.
