= Kevon Lambert =

Jamaican footballer (born 1997)

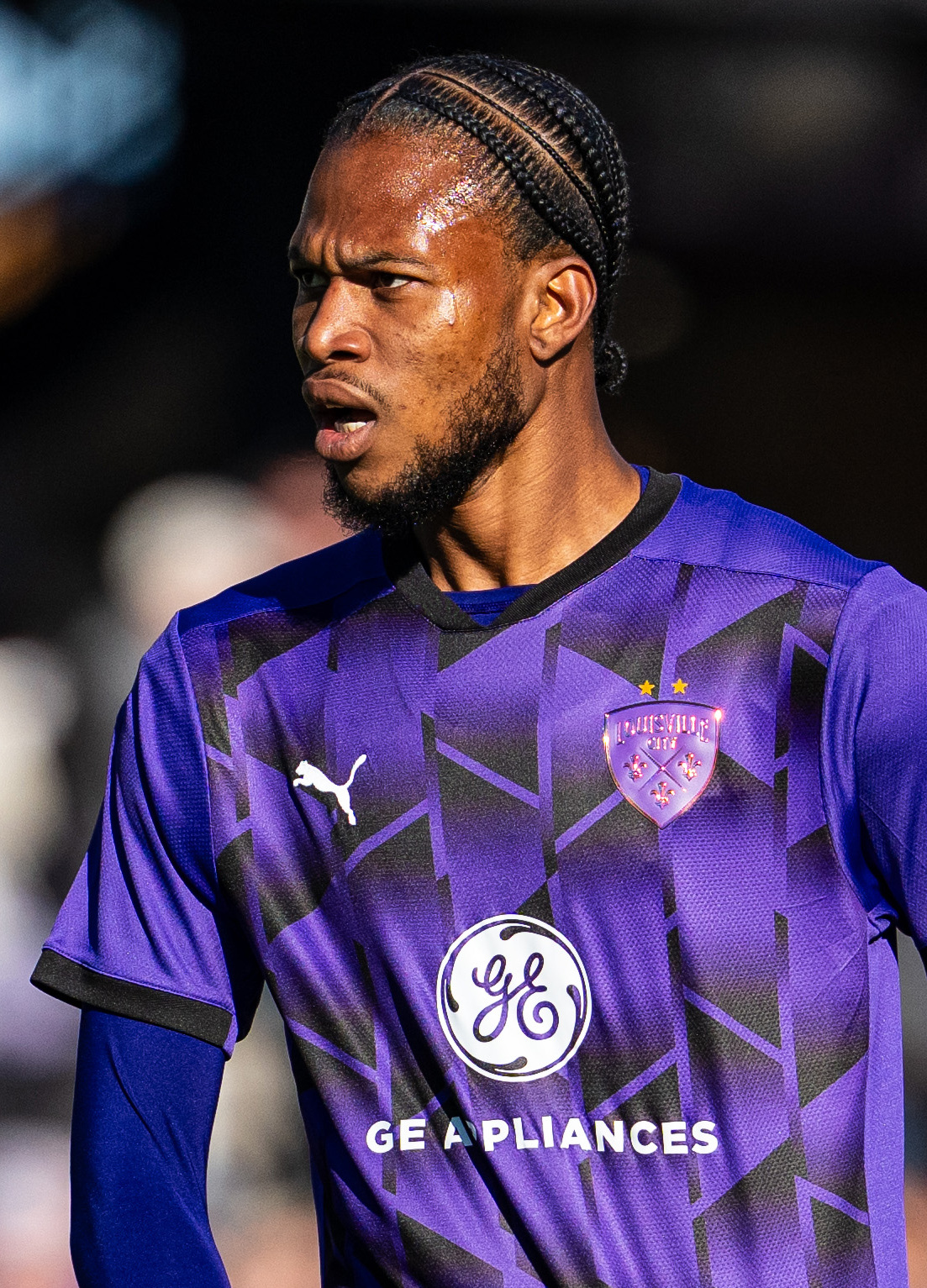
- Lambert with Louisville City in 2025

Personal information
- Date of birth: 22 March 1997 (age 29)
- Place of birth: Clarendon Parish, Jamaica
- Height: 1.90 m (6 ft 3 in)
- Positions: Defender; midfielder

Team information
- Current team: Louisville City
- Number: 31

Youth career
- 2011–2015: Glenmuir High School

Senior career*
Years	Team	Apps	(Gls)
2016–2017	Montego Bay United	12	(0)
2017–2023	Phoenix Rising	147	(13)
2023–2025	Real Salt Lake	2	(0)
2024	→ San Antonio FC (loan)	22	(3)
2025	→ Louisville City (loan)	26	(3)
2026–	Louisville City	14	(3)

International career^{‡}
2016–2017	Jamaica U20		
2017–	Jamaica	28	(0)
Medal record
Men's football
Representing Jamaica
CONCACAF Gold Cup
Runner-up	2017 United States	Team
- * Club domestic league appearances and goals as of 31 October 2026 ‡ National team caps and goals as of 6 June 2024

Kevon Lambert (born 22 March 1997) is a Jamaican professional footballer who plays as a defender or midfielder for USL Championship club Louisville City FC, and the Jamaica national team.

== Club career ==
=== Montego Bay United ===
Lambert joined Montego Bay United in September 2016, having previously played football at Glenmuir High School, where he won the 2012 daCosta Cup, and was named captain in his last year. Prior to joining MBU, he spent time on trial with Premier League club West Ham alongside compatriot Rodave Murray in 2016.

He made his debut for MBU in November 2016, deputising for injured midfielder Dwayne Ambusley against Arnett Gardens.

In spring/summer of 2017, Lambert spent the month of May on trial with Serbian side FK Vojvodina, but was unable to sign a professional contract due to European Work Permit complications.

=== Phoenix Rising FC ===
Phoenix Rising FC signed Lambert on 10 August 2017. Lambert re-signed with Phoenix Rising FC for the 2019 season. Lambert transferred from Rising to Real Salt Lake on 16 August 2023. He left Phoenix as the club's all-time leader in appearances across all competitions with 161.

=== Real Salt Lake ===
In August 2023, Lambert was transferred to Major League Soccer team Real Salt Lake. He made his debut on August 26, coming on as a second-half substitute against the Houston Dynamo.

=== Louisville City ===
In 2025, Lambert went out loan to Louisville City, in 2026 he made the permanent move to the USL Championship club.

== International career ==
Lambert was called up to the Jamaica Under 20 side in 2016 to play in qualification games for the 2017 CONCACAF U-20 Championship.

Lambert was called up by Jamaica head coach Theodore Whitmore in February 2017, to play against the USA, however he remained on the bench. He made his senior international debut 13 days later, on 16 February 2017, starting in a 1–0 win over Honduras.

== Career statistics ==
=== Club ===
As of 15 June 2024.

Club	Season	League			Cup		Continental		Other		Total	
Club	Season	Division	Apps	Goals	Apps	Goals	Apps	Goals	Apps	Goals	Apps	Goals
Montego Bay United	2016–17	National Premier League	12	0	0	0	0	0	0	0	12	0
Phoenix Rising	2017	USL Championship	10	1	0	0	0	0	0	0	10	1
Phoenix Rising	2018	USL Championship	32	3	0	0	0	0	0	0	32	3
Phoenix Rising	2019	USL Championship	28	4	1	0	0	0	0	0	29	4
Phoenix Rising	2020	USL Championship	17	1	0	0	0	0	0	0	17	1
Phoenix Rising	2021	USL Championship	30	2	0	0	0	0	0	0	1	1
Phoenix Rising	2022	USL Championship	26	3	1	0	0	0	0	0	27	3
Phoenix Rising	2023	USL Championship	15	1	1	0	0	0	0	0	16	1
Phoenix Rising	Total		158	15	3	0	0	0	0	0	161	15
Real Salt Lake	2023	MLS	15	1	0	0	0	0	0	0	15	1
Real Salt Lake	2024	MLS	0	0	0	0	0	0	0	0	0	0
Real Salt Lake	Total		15	1	0	0	0	0	0	0	15	1
San Antonio FC	2024	USL Championship	13	2	1	0	0	0	0	0	14	2
Career Total			186	18	4	0	0	0	0	0	190	18

=== International ===
As of match played 6 June 2024.

National team	Year	Apps	Goals
Jamaica	2017	8	0
Jamaica	2018	1	0
Jamaica	2019	3	0
Jamaica	2020	2	0
Jamaica	2021	1	0
Jamaica	2022	4	0
Jamaica	2023	8	0
Jamaica	2024	1	0
Total		28	0

== Honours ==
Phoenix Rising FC

- USL Cup Runner-up: 2018
- USLC Regular Season Winners: 2019
- Western Conference Winners (Playoffs): 2018, 2020
- Western Conference Winners (Regular Season): 2019

Jamaica

- Caribbean Cup Runner-up: 2017
- CONCACAF Gold Cup Runner-up: 2017
