= Nicholas Gaitan =

American soccer player

Nicholas Gaitan (born 29 March 1995) is an American soccer player who plays as a midfielder for Villa Dálmine. Besides the United States, he has played in Greece, Spain, and Argentina.

== Career ==
In 2022, Gaitan signed for Argentine second-tier side Villa Dálmine. On 8 October 2022, he debuted for Villa Dálmine during a 0–0 draw with Chacarita Juniors.
