= Joey Calistri =

American soccer player

Personal information
- Full name: Joey Vito Calistri
- Date of birth: November 20, 1993 (age 32)
- Place of birth: Deerfield, Illinois, United States
- Height: 1.80 m (5 ft 11 in)
- Positions: Forward; winger

Youth career
- 2010–2012: Chicago Fire

College career
Years	Team	Apps	(Gls)
2012–2015	Northwestern Wildcats	76	(30)

Senior career*
Years	Team	Apps	(Gls)
2012–2015	Chicago Fire U-23	22	(11)
2016–2017	Chicago Fire	14	(1)
2017	→ Tulsa Roughnecks (loan)	32	(9)
2018	Saint Louis FC	32	(5)
2019–2022	Phoenix Rising	104	(10)
2019	→ FC Tucson (loan)	1	(0)
- * Club domestic league appearances and goals

Joey Calistri (born November 20, 1993) is an American former professional soccer player.

== Career ==
=== Youth ===
Calistri was a member of the Chicago Fire Academy for three seasons before spending his college career at Northwestern University.

Calistri also played in the Premier Development League for Chicago Fire U-23.

=== Professional ===
On December 17, 2015, Calistri signed a homegrown contract with the Chicago Fire.

He made his professional debut on March 6, 2016, as an 81st-minute substitute during a 3–4 defeat to New York City FC.

Calistri signed with USL side Saint Louis FC on January 17, 2018.

On December 20, 2018, Calistri joined USL Championship side Phoenix Rising ahead of the 2019 season.
