= Rick Schantz =

American soccer coach

Personal information
- Full name: Richard Lewis Schantz
- Place of birth: Tucson, Arizona, U.S.

College career
Years	Team	Apps	(Gls)
1993–1996	Portland Pilots		

Managerial career
- 2011–2017: FC Tucson
- 2017: Phoenix Rising (interim)
- 2018–2022: Phoenix Rising

Richard Lewis Schantz is an American soccer coach. He co-founded FC Tucson in 2010 and was its first head coach. He was also head coach of Phoenix Rising FC in the USL Championship.

== Coaching record ==
As of August 4, 2021

Team	From	To	Record				
Team	From	To	G	W	L	T	Win %
FC Tucson	October 10, 2010	January 8, 2017	110	71	22	17	64.55
Phoenix Rising FC (Interim)	April 24, 2017	May 21, 2017	7	3	4	0	42.86
Phoenix Rising FC (Interim)	June 12, 2018	November 13, 2018	24	15	7	2	62.50
Phoenix Rising FC	November 14, 2018	August 17, 2022	68	47	11	10	69.12
Career totals			209	136	44	29	65.07

== Honors ==
- USL Championship Coach of the Year
  - Winner: 2019

== Personal life ==
Schantz is a native of Tucson, Arizona, and graduated from Salpointe Catholic High School.

=== Homophobia controversy ===
During a Phoenix Rising game with San Diego Loyal on September 30, 2020, midfielder Junior Flemmings was accused of using a Jamaican homophobic slur against the openly gay Loyal midfielder Collin Martin. Loyal, who had been leading 3–1 up to that point, walked off the field in protest and forfeited the match.

Video capturing an exchange between Rising coach Rich Schantz and Loyal coach Landon Donovan over the incident led to claims of Schantz telling Donovan that the incident was "part of the game," that the players were "competing," as well as accusations that Schantz tried to downplay the incident. Schantz later denied such accusations, saying his words were "misconstrued," and that he was not excusing "any alleged homophobic behavior" from his players.

The incident led to an investigation by USL Championship, and Schantz was placed on administrative leave following the incident. Team officials say Schantz's placement on administrative leave was unrelated to the investigation, but did later say the administrative leave was related to his initial reaction to the incident, which team officials categorized as "dismissive". Schantz later apologized to Martin, as well as his team, the USL Championship league, and the LGBTQ community over the incident, and subsequently resumed his coaching duties on October 21.

=== Leaves Phoenix Rising FC ===
Schantz parted ways with Phoenix Rising FC on August 17, 2022.
