= Santi Moar =

Spanish footballer

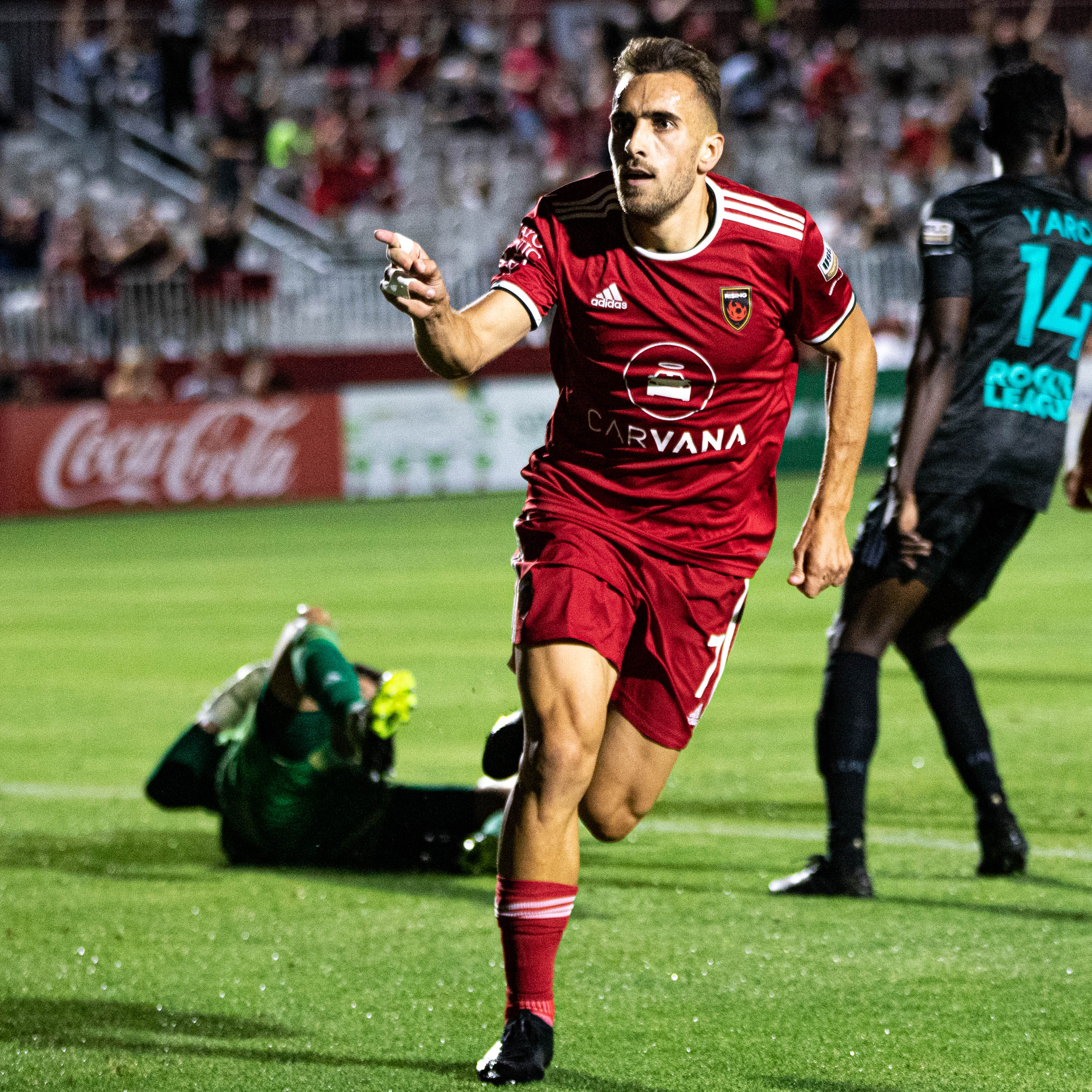
- Moar celebrating his goal in the Phoenix Rising's home opener against the San Diego Loyal on April 30, 2021

Personal information
- Full name: Santiago Moar Sánchez
- Date of birth: 5 September 1993 (age 33)
- Place of birth: Ordes, Spain
- Height: 1.74 m (5 ft 9 in)
- Position: Forward

College career
Years	Team	Apps	(Gls)
2014–2016	Pfeiffer Falcons	45	(24)

Senior career*
Years	Team	Apps	(Gls)
2012	SD Órdenes	1	(0)
2012–2014	SD Sporting Sada	55	(7)
2016	Charlotte Eagles	14	(8)
2017–2018	Bethlehem Steel	63	(12)
2019	New Mexico United	33	(11)
2020–2022	Phoenix Rising	76	(20)
2023	New Mexico United	28	(2)
2024	Badajoz	2	(0)
- * Club domestic league appearances and goals as of 7 April 2024

Santiago "Santi" Moar Sánchez (born 5 September 1993) is a Spanish footballer who plays as a forward. Moar is most frequently utilized as a left winger.

== Playing career ==
=== Youth and college ===
Moar played three years of college soccer at Pfeiffer University between 2014 and 2016, including a redshirted year in 2014. He made a total of 45 appearances, scoring 24 goals in his time at Pfeiffer.

While at college, Moar also appeared for Premier Development League side Charlotte Eagles in 2016.

== Club ==
=== Bethlehem Steel FC ===
On 17 January 2017, Moar was selected in the fourth round (82nd overall) in the 2017 MLS SuperDraft by Philadelphia Union. On 30 January 2017, Moar signed with Philadelphia's United Soccer League affiliate club Bethlehem Steel FC.

Moar was released by Bethlehem Steel on 19 November 2018.

=== New Mexico United ===
On 12 December 2018, Moar was signed by USL Championship expansion club New Mexico United ahead of its inaugural season. Moar earned second team all-league honors for his 11 goal and six assist season.

=== Phoenix Rising FC ===
On 3 December 2019, Moar signed with Phoenix Rising FC.

=== New Mexico United ===
Moar returned to New Mexico on 19 December 2022, joining the club for an undisclosed transfer fee.

=== CD Badajoz ===
In March 2024, Moar signed for Segunda Federación - Group 5 club Badajoz.

== Career statistics ==
As of match played October 24, 2020

Appearances by club, season, and competition
Club	Season	League			Domestic Cup		League Cup		Total	
Club	Season	Division	Apps	Goals	Apps	Goals	Apps	Goals	Apps	Goals
SD Órdenes	2012/13	Tercera División	1	0	—		—		1	0
SD Sporting Sada	2012/13	Preferente Autonómica de Galicia	24	2	—		—		24	2
SD Sporting Sada	2013/14	Preferente Autonómica de Galicia	31	5	—		—		31	5
SD Sporting Sada	Total		55	7	—		—		55	7
Charlotte Eagles	2016	USL PDL	14	8	0	0	1 (Note: Appearance(s) in PDL playoffs)	0	15	8
Bethlehem Steel	2017	USL	30	6	—		0	0	30	6
Bethlehem Steel	2018	USL	33	6	—		2 (Note: Appearance(s) in USL playoffs)	0	35	6
Bethlehem Steel	Total		63	12	—		2	0	65	12
New Mexico United	2019	USL Championship	32	11	5 (Note: Appearance(s) in US Open Cup)	1	1 (Note: Appearance(s) in USL Championship playoffs)	0	38	12
Phoenix Rising	2020	USL Championship	13	2	—		3	0	16	2
Career total			178	40	5	1	7	0	190	41
