= Charlie Dennis =

English footballer (born 1995)

Personal information
- Date of birth: 28 September 1995 (age 31)
- Place of birth: Brighton, England
- Height: 1.87 m (6 ft 2 in)
- Position: Midfielder

Team information
- Current team: New Mexico United on loan from Phoenix Rising
- Number: 14

Youth career
- 2005–2012: Southampton

College career
Years	Team	Apps	(Gls)
2014–2015	Shorter Hawks	39	(16)
2016–2017	Palm Beach Atlantic Sailfish	33	(15)

Senior career*
Years	Team	Apps	(Gls)
2017–2018	South Georgia Tormenta	15	(4)
2018	Nashville SC	0	(0)
2019	South Georgia Tormenta	27	(3)
2020–2021	FC Tucson	40	(9)
2022	Oakland Roots	32	(3)
2023–2024	Tampa Bay Rowdies	47	(12)
2024–	Phoenix Rising	51	(10)
2026–	→ New Mexico United (loan)	8	(2)
- * Club domestic league appearances and goals as of 18:48, 10 November 2026 (UTC)

Charlie Dennis (born 28 September 1995) is an English professional footballer who plays as a midfielder for New Mexico United in the USL Championship on loan from Phoenix Rising.

== College Career ==
Dennis played two years at NCAA Division II Shorter University in Rome, Georgia where he made 37 starts in 39 appearances. In 2015 he was named to the First Team All-South Region.

Moving to Palm Beach Atlantic University for two years, Dennis then appeared in 33 matches, all starts, for the Division II Sailfish. Following the 2017 season Dennis was named Sunshine State Conference Player of the Year earning All-SSC First Team honors.

== Club career ==
Dennis signed with USL Championship club Oakland Roots SC on 19 January 2022. On 16 December 2022, Tampa Bay Rowdies signed Dennis from Oakland for an undisclosed fee.

Dennis transferred to Phoenix Rising on 17 July 2024.

In September 2026, New Mexico United acquired Dennis via loan from Phoenix Rising for the remainder of the USL Championship season.
