= Phoenix Rising FC =

American professional soccer club based in Phoenix

Phoenix Rising
- Full name: Phoenix Rising Football Club
- Short name: PRFC
- Founded: March 13, 2014; 12 years ago (as Arizona United SC)
- Stadium: Phoenix Rising Soccer Stadium; Phoenix, Arizona
- Capacity: 10,000
- Owners: List: Pablo Prichard; Berke Bakay; Brett M. Johnson; Alex Zheng; Tim Riester; Mark Detmer; Didier Drogba; Brandon McCarthy; Diplo; Pete Wentz; David Rappaport; Dave Stearns; Rick Hauser; William Kraus; Kevin Kusatsu; Mark Leber; Jim Scussel; Christopher Yeung
- Head coach: Pa-Modou Kah
- League: USL Championship
- 2025: 5th, Western Conference; Playoffs: Conference Semifinals
- Website: phxrisingfc.com
Home colors	Away colors	Third colors

Phoenix Rising Football Club is an American professional soccer team based in Phoenix, Arizona. Founded in 2014 as Arizona United Soccer Club, the team is a member of the USL Championship, the second division of American soccer. Phoenix has enjoyed moderate success in their history, winning the Western Conference title multiple times and having won the USL Championship final once in 2023.

The club currently plays at the Phoenix Rising Soccer Stadium east of Downtown Phoenix, and has played in the Phoenix metro area the club's whole existence.

== History ==
On March 13, 2014, Kyle Eng, owner of an advertising agency, launched the franchise and named it Arizona United SC. It took the place of Phoenix FC, which folded the previous day, in the USL Pro league due to Phoenix FC failing to pay its players on time and submitting misleading and inaccurate financial statements.

=== 2014 season ===
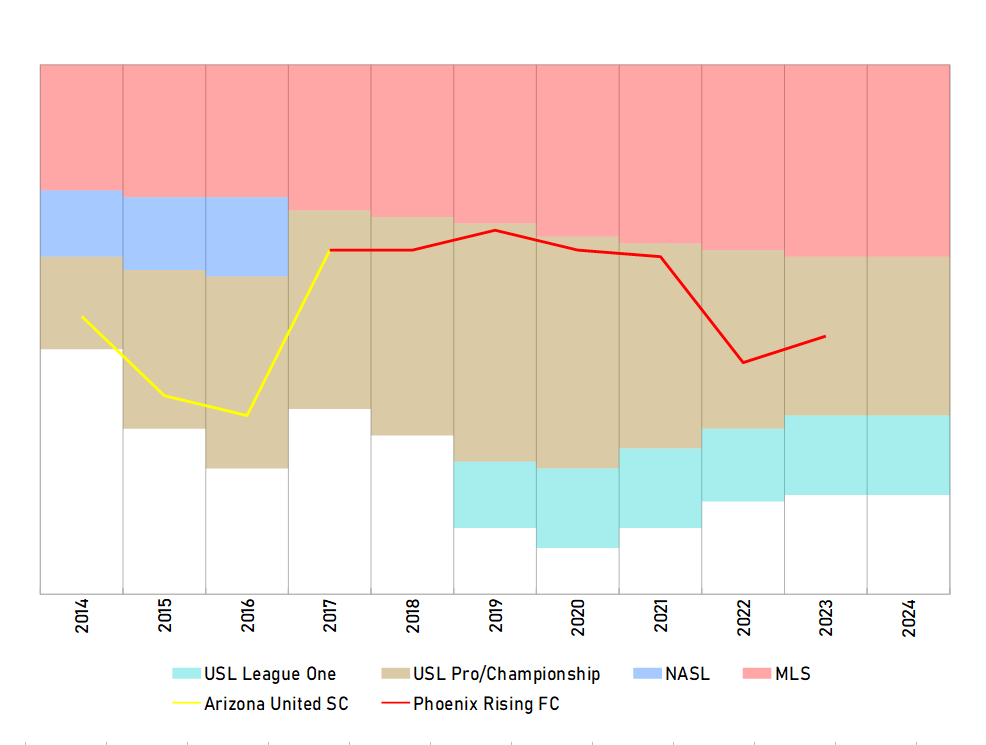
Historical chart of Phoenix Rising's regular season performance within the American soccer pyramid, 2014 to 2024

In just 178 days after the franchise was awarded by the USL Pro, Arizona United hired a front office staff and coach, put together a roster, secured a stadium, played 28 regular season games, reached the fourth round of the US Open Cup and was in contention for a playoff spot until the next-to-last week of the season.

University of Maryland Assistant Coach Michael Dellorusso was named head coach on March 28, 2014. United lost their first game to Oklahoma City Energy FC 4–0 on April 12, 2014. They defeated Sacramento Republic FC 2–1 for their first win on April 19, 2014. Brandon Swartzendruber scored the team's first ever goal in the 37th minute. FC Dallas loanee Jonathan Top scored the game winner in the 85th minute.

United won four of their last five games to move up from 13th place to 9th, but fell four points short of qualifying for the playoffs. Jonathan Top and ex-Orlando City standout Long Tan led the team in scoring with five goals each. Tan was also selected for the All-League Second Team. Goalkeeper Evan Newton was second in the league in saves. United finished with a 10–13–5 record.

==== 2014 US Open Cup ====
In their first US Open Cup appearance, Arizona United lasted until the fourth round, the longest Open Cup run of any Arizona club. Entering the tournament in the second round, United defeated Portland Timbers U23s of the PDL 3–2 in Portland on May 13. They were losing 2–1 late in the game when London Woodberry tied the game in the 88th minute and Daniel Antúnez scored the winning goal with seconds left in stoppage time. In the third round, United defeated Oklahoma City Energy FC of USL Pro 2–1 in extra time May 28 at the Peoria Sports Complex. The game winner was scored by Bradlee Baladez in the 112th Minute and Evan Newton saved a last minute penalty kick awarded to the Energy. Their Open Cup run ended with a 2–1 loss to the eventual MLS Cup champion LA Galaxy at home on June 18. Gyasi Zardes scored two goals in the second half two minutes apart after Matt Kassel gave United a 1–0 lead at halftime.

=== 2015 season ===
Arizona United signed a one-year agreement to play their home games at Scottsdale Stadium on December 16, 2014. United signed a one-year affiliation agreement with FC Dallas on February 9, 2015. United finished 10th in the Western Conference with a 10–16–2 record. Goalkeeper Carl Woszczynski set a USL record with 130 saves. Long Tan again led the team with 14 goals, which was tied for 4th in the league with Luke Vercollone. Tan was also selected for the USL All-League First Team. On September 25, the club declined to extend the contract of head coach Michael Dellorusso.

=== 2016 season ===
Brett M. Johnson, founder and CEO of Benevolent Capital and managing director of Zealot Networks, purchased a minority share of the team. He was named co-chairman and president of Arizona United on December 9, 2015. Frank Yallop, who coached the San Jose Earthquakes to MLS Cup championships in 2001 & 2003, was signed to a three-year contract as head coach and president of soccer operations on December 23, 2015. An investment group of music artists and executives led by Grammy Award winning DJ, record producer and rapper/songwriter Diplo purchased a minority stake in Arizona United on January 27, 2016. Scottsdale Stadium did not renew their lease with United and the team signed a three-year lease with their original stadium, Peoria Sports Complex, on January 26, 2016. Pete Wentz, bassist for the rock group Fall Out Boy, purchased a minority share on April 11, 2016.

=== 2017 season: rebranding and playoff run ===
On August 31, 2016, team founder Kyle Eng sold his majority share to an investment group led by Berke Bakay, president and CEO of Kona Grill. On November 28, 2016, the team was rebranded Phoenix Rising FC by the new ownership.

On March 25, 2017, A record crowd of 6,890 attended Rising FC's first game of 2017 at their new Phoenix Rising FC Soccer Complex, a soccer-specific stadium and training facility built on the Salt River Pima–Maricopa Indian Community near Tempe. They lost to Toronto FC II 1–0. They defeated LA Galaxy II 2–1 for their first win at the complex and as Rising FC on April 8.

The 2017 season started with three major signings. Guadalajara's all-time leading scorer Omar Bravo was signed on February 9. Shaun Wright-Phillips, who played for Manchester City, Chelsea, New York Red Bulls and the England national team, was signed on February 24. Former Chelsea player and Ivory Coast leading goalscorer Didier Drogba was signed on April 12. He also purchased an ownership stake in the club.

Another record crowd of 7,126 welcomed Drogba to the "Valley of the Sun," as Greater Phoenix is sometimes known, and Phoenix Rising FC defeated the Swope Park Rangers 4–3 on April 23. Frank Yallop resigned as director of soccer operations and head coach on April 24, 2017, for family reasons. Assistant coach Rick Schantz was named interim head coach. Former Ligue 1 and Mali national team coach Patrice Carteron was named Rising FC Head Coach on May 22, 2017.

In the second half of the season, the Rising won 11 games, tied 3 and lost only one. This included 11 straight games without a loss with a five-game winning streak, both team records. Jason Johnson lead the team with 13 goals. Didier Drogba scored 9 goals, even though he was out for a few weeks with a groin injury. During the unbeaten streak, goalkeeper Josh Cohen earned 6 shutouts in 8 games, which gave him the USL Player of the Month award for September.

The Rising clinched their first ever playoff berth by defeating the Portland Timbers 2 on September 27 by a 2–0 score. Their record was 17 wins, 8 losses and 7 ties, earning them 5th place in the Western Conference. A penalty kick shootout won by Swope Park Rangers eliminated Phoenix after playing to a 1–1 tie. The game was interrupted by lightning and heavy rains after the first half, so the second half was played the following day.

Phoenix Rising FC purchased FC Tucson of the Premier Development League, now known as USL League Two, on October 11, 2017. FC Tucson serves as Rising FC's USL 2 affiliate.

=== 2018 season ===
Advantage Sports Union Ltd., led by Alex Zheng, purchased a share of Phoenix Rising on February 10, 2018, to bolster its MLS bid.

=== 2019 season ===
Phoenix Rising FC concluded an international cooperation agreement with Galatasaray SK of Turkey on April 5, 2019. The partnership includes cooperation on soccer operations, commercial projects, discovery and training of youth soccer players, international exhibition matches, tournaments and training programs for coaches and players.

From May 5 to September 14, 2019, Phoenix Rising FC won 20 consecutive matches – setting a league and North American record for the longest winning streak. The streak ran parallel with another streak of home wins during the club's "Dollar Beer Night" promotion, which dates back to 2017. The streak came to an end on September 21 with a 2–1 loss to Fresno FC. Rising FC earned the USL Championship Regular Season Title on September 28 after playing New Mexico United to a 2–2 draw.

=== 2020 season ===
Phoenix Rising FC finished the season with a 11–2–3 (35 points) record in a COVID-shortened season. Immediately after the first week of competition, the season was suspended by the United Soccer League due to the worldwide COVID-19 Pandemic. Prior to the resumption of play, The rules of competition were changed, placing teams in "groups" to decrease team-to-team contact as well as reduce travel costs. Phoenix Rising finished atop its group, which included LA Galaxy II, Orange County SC, San Diego Loyal SC, and Las Vegas Lights FC. The team's 35 points were enough for second place in the Western Conference, behind only now-defunct Reno 1868 FC.

Phoenix Rising FC defeated Sacramento Republic FC 1–0 in the USL Western Conference Playoffs, and advanced on kicks-from-the mark (4–5) after a 2–2 draw with Reno 1868 FC in the conference Semi-finals. On October 24, 2020, Phoenix Rising earned its second Western Conference Championship, moving past El Paso Locomotive FC in kicks-from-the-mark (4–2) after playing to a 1–1 draw.

Normally, this would have earned Rising a chance to host the 2020 USL Championship Final. Rising had finished tied with Louisville City FC on points and wins, but Rising finished with a higher goal differential. However, just before the Western Conference Final, Phoenix Rising announced it would not host the Championship Final if it advanced that far. Rising was only in contention to host the final after San Diego Loyal walked off the field during its September 30 match in protest of Junior Flemmings directing a homophobic slur at one of its players. Due to the ensuing outcry, Rising announced that if it advanced to the Championship Final, it would give up home field advantage to the Eastern Conference champion. Rising were set to play against the Tampa Bay Rowdies in the Championship Final, but the game was canceled due to a COVID-19 outbreak in the Rowdies organization.

Team captain Solomon Asante was voted the league's Most Valuable Player for the second time, joining Kevin Molino as the only players to achieve such honors, and the first to do so in consecutive seasons. Winger Junior Flemmings earned the Golden Boot for scoring 14 goals in 14 appearances prior to being suspended at the end of the season.

==== Homophobia controversy ====
During a game with San Diego Loyal on September 30, Junior Flemmings was accused of using a Jamaican homophobic slur against the openly gay Loyal midfielder Collin Martin. The Loyal, who had been leading 3–1 up to that point, walked off the field in protest and forfeited the match.

Video capturing an exchange between Rising coach Rick Schantz and Loyal coach Landon Donovan over the incident led to claims of Schantz telling Donovan that the incident was "part of the game," that the players were "competing," as well as accusations that Schantz tried to downplay the incident. Brandon McCarthy, a minority-owner, was accused of questioning the veracity of accusations made against Flemmings, suggesting in a direct message with another Twitter user that the Loyal, who forfeited a match against the LA Galaxy II in the days prior over the alleged use of a racial slur against a Black Loyal player, planned to forfeit the match to continue making a statement on social justice.

Prior to the incident, the Rising, along with McCarthy, were noted for their support of the LGBTQ+ community.

As a result of the incident and statements in the aftermath, both Flemmings and Head Coach Rick Schantz were suspended and fined. Schantz was reinstated as head coach on October 21 after Collin Martin accepted an apology by Schantz for his remarks.

=== 2021 season ===
On February 18, 2021, Rising FC transferred ownership of FC Tucson to Benevolent Sports Tucson LLC, led by Rising minority owner Brett M. Johnson.

Rising FC opened the 2021 season in a new team complex in Chandler, Phoenix Rising Soccer Complex at Wild Horse Pass. The team offices were moved there, in addition to a main stadium and two practice fields constructed on the site. They won their first game at the new, 10,000 seat capacity Wild Horse Pass stadium by defeating San Diego Loyal SC 4–1 on April 30, 2021.

=== 2023 season ===
Rising FC opened the season on a skid of poor form before pulling their way into the playoff as the season came to a close. The first round of the postseason, they defeated their rivals San Diego Loyal in that club's final game ever before going on an unprecedented run to win the Western Conference, and then the USL title itself on penalties, the club's first USL title.

== Colors and badge ==
Phoenix Rising FC's official colors are red, black, white, gold and grey.

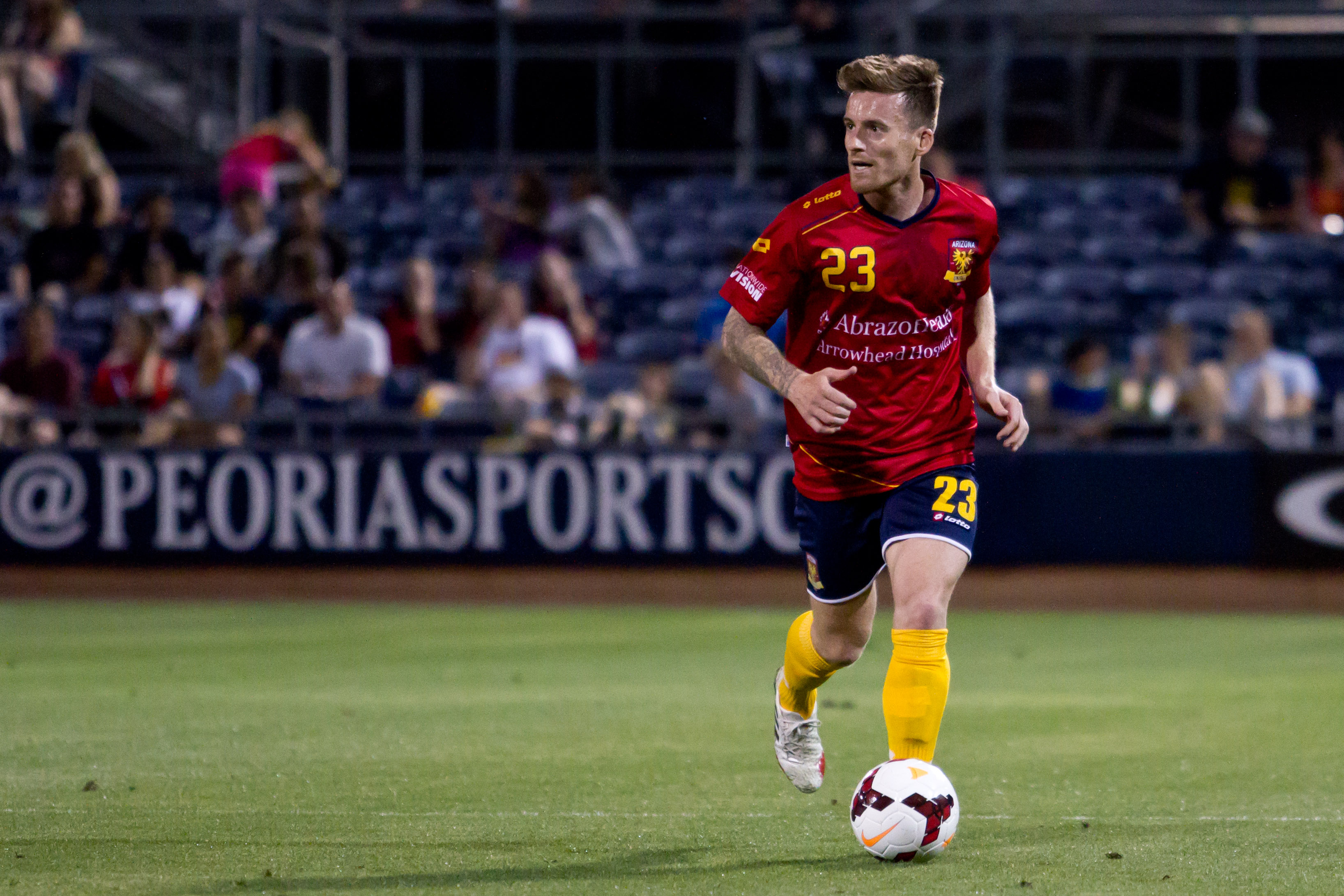
Scott Morrison in 2014, wearing the previous Arizona United branding of Phoenix Rising

=== Sponsorship ===
Seasons	Shirt manufacturer	Shirt sponsor
2014	(Italy) Lotto	Front: Abrazo Health Care; Back: OrthoArizona; Secondary: Nationwide Vision
2015	(Germany) Adidas	Front: Dignity Health; Back: NuAquos Sports Drink; Secondary: Nationwide Vision; TexasHoldEm.com
2016	(United States) Nike	Front: Food City
2017	(Germany) Adidas	Front: Mad Decent; Secondary: Mayo Clinic
2018–2020	(Italy) Macron	Front: Carvana; Secondary: Mayo Clinic
2021	(Germany) Adidas	Front: Carvana; Secondary: Mayo Clinic
2022–present	(Germany) Adidas	Front: Carvana; Secondary: Northern Arizona University

Los Bandidos during an October 2026 away day match against Orange County SC.

== Club culture ==
There is one supporter group of Phoenix Rising FC: "Los Bandidos Football Firm", located in the southern end of the stadium. The Bandidos were founded in 2017 following the club's rebrand from Arizona United to Phoenix Rising, inspiring fans who appreciated the localization of the club's branding to focus on the Phoenix area. The Bandidos gained notability during the club's 2023 championship run, where they were acclaimed for their strong support away from Phoenix.

== Stadiums ==
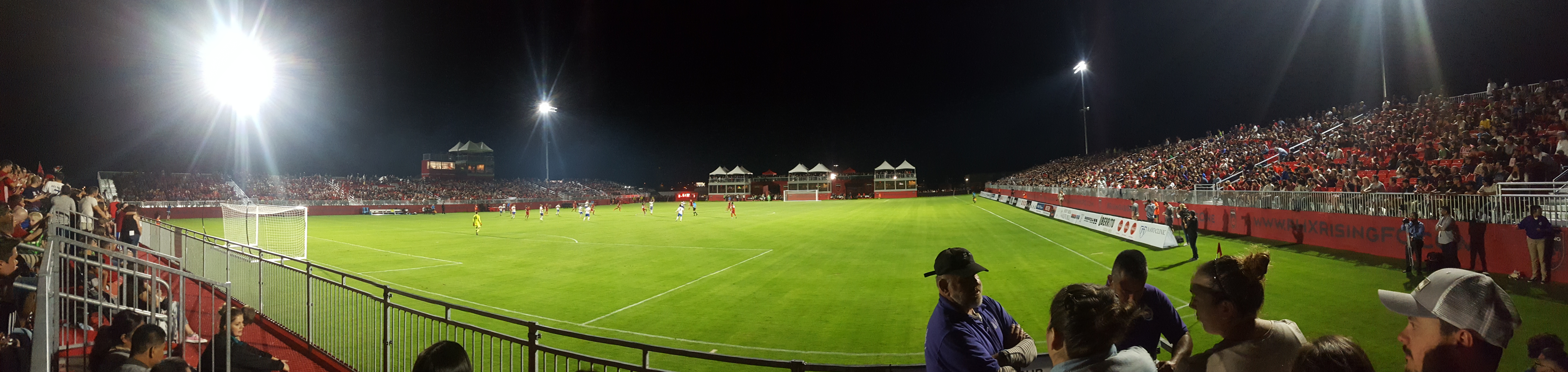
The inaugural match for the Phoenix Rising Soccer Complex on March 25, 2017, Toronto FC II vs. Phoenix Rising FC

Arizona United SC called the Peoria Sports Complex home during the 2014 and 2016 seasons. They played at Scottsdale Stadium during the 2015 season.

In 2017, a soccer-specific stadium, the Phoenix Rising Soccer Complex, was constructed in time for the 2017 season, the first for the newly rechristened Phoenix Rising FC. On March 15, 2019, Casino Arizona signed a sponsorship deal with Rising, including naming rights to the stadium, which was renamed Casino Arizona Field.

The club announced, beginning with the 2021 USL Championship season, it would move to the Phoenix Rising Soccer Complex at Wild Horse Pass in Chandler, and closing the temporary stadium at Casino Arizona Field. In 2022, the club agreed to build a new stadium in Phoenix proper by the Phoenix Sky Harbor International Airport, with Phoenix Rising starting play at their new stadium beginning with the 2023 season.

=== Arizona United SC ===
Venue	Location	Years in use	Capacity
Peoria Sports Complex	Peoria, Arizona	2014, 2016	12,339
Scottsdale Stadium	Scottsdale, Arizona	2015	12,000

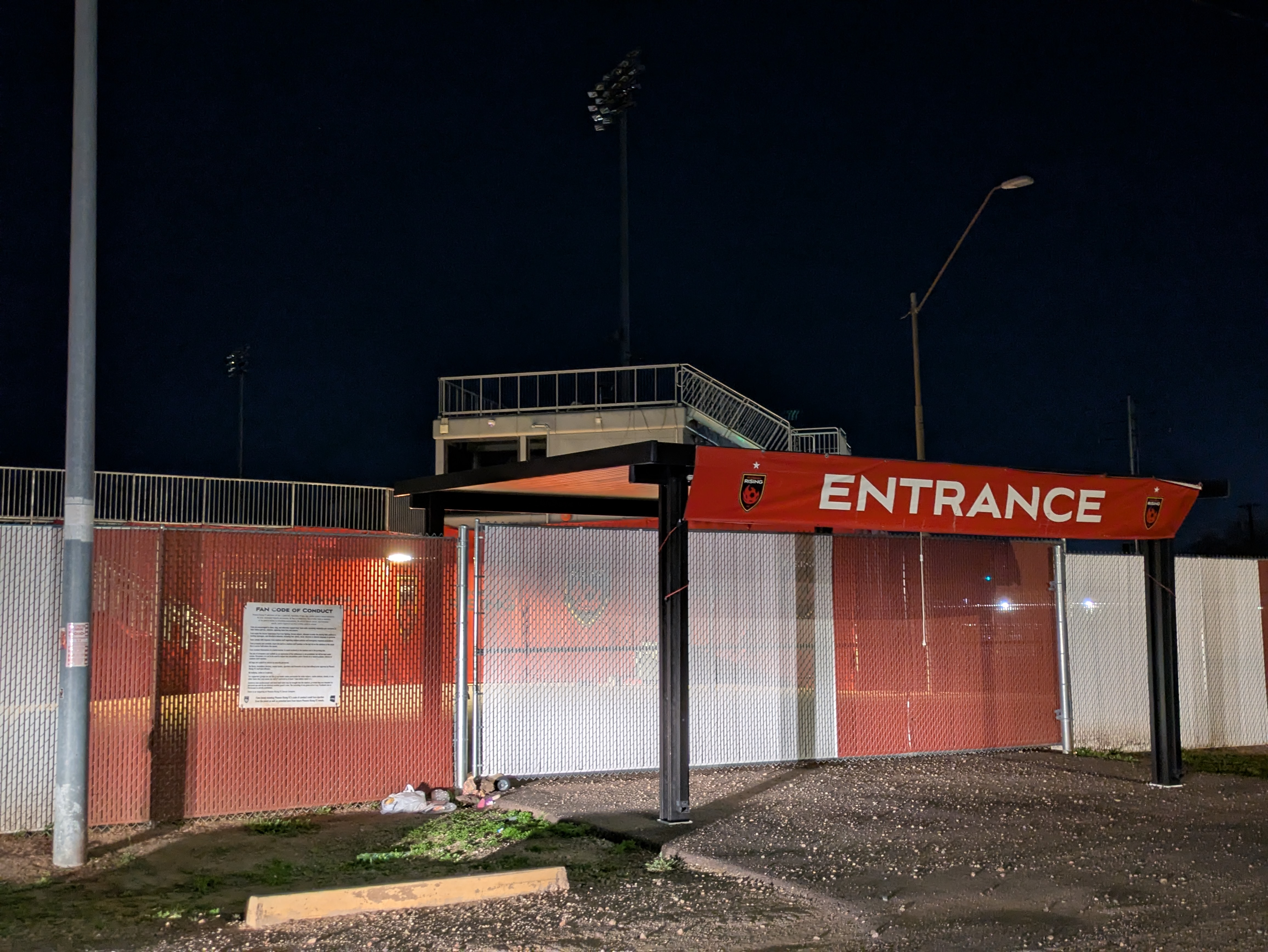
Entrance to Phoenix Rising Soccer Stadium, the current home of Phoenix Rising FC.

=== Phoenix Rising FC ===
Venue	Location	Years in use	Capacity
Casino Arizona Field	Tempe, Arizona	2017–2020	6,200
Wild Horse Pass Stadium	Chandler, Arizona	2021–2022	10,000
Phoenix Rising Soccer Stadium	Phoenix, Arizona	2023–present	10,000

== Players and staff ==
=== Current roster ===
As of September 27, 2025

Note: Flags indicate national team as defined under FIFA eligibility rules; some limited exceptions apply. Players may hold more than one non-FIFA nationality.

No.	Pos.	Nation	Player
1	GK	GER	Patrick Rakovsky
2	DF	USA	Collin Smith
4	DF	SEN	Pape Mar Boye
5	DF	GER	Rafael Czichos
7	FW	FRA	Ihsan Sacko
8	MF	MEX	Diego Gómez
9	FW	COL	Juan Carvajal
10	MF	GHA	Hope Avayevu
11	FW	CAY	Gunnar Studenhofft
12	MF	ENG	Charlie Dennis
13	MF	CMR	Jean-Éric Moursou
14	GK	USA	Chituru Odunze (on loan from Charlotte FC)
17	MF	USA	JP Scearce
19	FW	GUA	Damian Rivera
20	DF	USA	Luke Biasi

No.	Pos.	Nation	Player
23	FW	SEN	Dominique Badji
24	DF	MEX	Adrian Pelayo
27	FW	ENG	Conrad Ambursley
28	FW	AUT	Kelvin Arase
33	MF	USA	Jackson Gaydon
44	MF	USA	Jamison Ping
45	FW	USA	Anthony Hernandez
47	MF	USA	Noah Cross
48	DF	USA	Tate Schmitt
68	MF	USA	Jackson Irwin
70	MF	COL	Juan David Torres (on loan from Charleston Battery)
80	MF	USA	Alexander Balanzar De la Cruz
87	DF	USA	Daniel Flores
88	DF	USA	Pierce Rizzo
91	DF	USA	Eziah Ramirez

=== Out on loan ===
Note: Flags indicate national team as defined under FIFA eligibility rules; some limited exceptions apply. Players may hold more than one non-FIFA nationality.

No.	Pos.	Nation	Player
6	DF	SRB	Aleksandar Vuković (on loan to Fort Wayne FC)

=== Staff ===
Board of Directors
Principal Owner / CEO	Dr. Pablo Prichard
USL Governor	William Kraus
Alternate USL Governor	Tim Riester
Board Member	Berke Bakay
Board Member	Brandon McCarthy
Board Member	David Stearns
Board Member	Alan Wen
Board Member	Alex Zheng
Front Office Staff
President	Bobby Dulle
Sporting Director	Brandon McCarthy
Director of Box Office Operations	Judy Kirk
Director of Ticket Sales	Eric Barrera
Finance Manager	Anna Duarte
Director of Marketing and Communications	Jason Minnick
Digital Media & Broadcast Relations Manager	H. Jose Bosch
Social Media Coordinator	Isabella Duran
Financial Consultant	Chris Casalena
Operations Manager	Annie Marum
Director of Partnerships	Joey Castor
Sr. Strategy & Operations Analyst	Kayla Lovan
Sr. Membership Services Account Executive	Josh Strugalski
Premium Sales Account Executive	Zack Stauffer
Group Sales Account Executive	Kemberly Montijo
Group Sales Account Executive	Michael Avila
Business Development Account Executive	Ethan Labeth
Partnerships Coordinator	Jessica Newton
Community Relations Manager	Gabriela Lawlor
Graphic Designer	JP Temchack
Technical Staff
Head coach	Pa-Modou Kah
Assistant coach	Vikram Virk
Assistant coach	Darnell King
Goalkeeping coach	Cory Robertson
Sports Performance Coach	Devon Manifold
Team Administrator	Thomas Markey
Video analyst	Chris Standring
Equipment Manager	Jake Minder
Medical Staff
Head Team Physician	Dr. Cameron Davis
Team Physician	Dr. Amon Ferry
Team Physician's Assistant	Don Dulle
Head Athletic Trainer	Greg Spence
Massage Therapist	Howard Chaite

=== Notable former players ===
- (Ghana) Solomon Asante
- (England) Tyler Blackwood
- (Mexico) Omar Bravo
- (United States) Joey Calistri
- (United States) Chris Cortez
- (United States) Kadeem Dacres
- (United States) Paolo DelPiccolo
- (Ivory Coast) Didier Drogba
- (United States) Joe Farrell
- (United States) Blair Gavin
- (United States) Adam Jahn
- (Jamaica) Jason Johnson
- (Jamaica) Kevon Lambert
- (United States) Zac Lubin
- (Scotland) Scott Morrison
- (United States) Evan Newton
- (Argentina) Rocco Ríos Novo
- (England) Peter Ramage
- (England) Luke Rooney
- (China) Long Tan
- (Mexico) Danny Trejo
- (United States) (Guatemala) Jonathan Top
- (United States) Rob Valentino
- (United States) London Woodberry
- (England) Shaun Wright-Phillips
- (United States) Carl Woszczynski

== Team records ==
=== Year-by-year ===
As of January 16, 2026

This is a partial list of the last five seasons completed by Rising. For the full season-by-season history, see List of Phoenix Rising FC seasons.

Season	Record											Position		Playoffs	USOC	Continental	Average attendance	Top goalscorer(s)	
Season	Div	League	Pld	W	L	D	GF	GA	GD	Pts	PPG	Conf.	Overall	Playoffs	USOC	Continental	Average attendance	Name	Goals
2021	USLC	2	32	20	5	7	68	35	+33	67	2.09	1st	2nd	QF	NH	DNQ	6,996	(Spain) Santi Moar	16
2022	USLC	2	34	12	16	6	50	58	-8	42	1.24	10th	17th	DNQ	R4	DNQ	7,358	(United States) Aodhan Quinn	9
2023	USLC	2	34	12	10	12	54	41	+13	48	1.41	6th	12th	W	R3	DNQ	6,100	(Mexico) Danny Trejo	19
2024	USLC	2	34	11	14	9	33	39	-6	42	1.24	8th	19th	R1	Ro16	DNQ	6,267	(France) Rémi Cabral	7
2025	USLC	2	30	9	13	8	48	48	0	40	1.33	5th	12th	SF	Ro32	DNQ	4,868	Two players	7

1. Avg. attendance include statistics from league matches only.
2. Top goalscorer(s) includes all goals scored in league, league playoffs, U.S. Open Cup, CONCACAF Champions League, FIFA Club World Cup, and other competitive continental matches.

=== Head coaches ===
- Includes USL Regular Season, USL Playoffs, U.S. Open Cup. Excludes friendlies.

Coach	Nationality	Start	End	Games	Win	Loss	Draw	Win %
Michael Dellorusso	United States	March 28, 2014	September 25, 2015	60	22	31	7	36.67
Frank Yallop	Canada	December 23, 2015	April 24, 2017	36	12	17	7	33.33
Rick Schantz (interim)	United States	April 24, 2017	May 21, 2017	7	3	4	0	42.86
Patrice Carteron	France	May 22, 2017	June 12, 2018	39	20	8	11	51.28
Rick Schantz (interim)	United States	June 12, 2018	November 13, 2018	24	15	7	2	62.50
Rick Schantz	United States	November 14, 2018	August 17, 2022	110	65	25	20	59.09
Blair Gavin (interim)	United States	October 3, 2020	October 21, 2020	3	3	0	0	100.00
Danny Stone (interim)	England	September 10, 2022	September 10, 2022	1	0	1	0	0.00
Juan Guerra	Venezuela	August 22, 2022	January 8, 2024	50	20	16	14	40.00
Danny Stone	England	January 18, 2024	June 29, 2024	19	6	7	6	31.58
Diego Gómez (interim)	Spain	June 29, 2024	November 7, 2024	18	6	9	3	33.33
Pa-Modou Kah	Norway	November 18, 2024	Present	0	0	0	0	—

=== Average attendance ===
Year	Reg. season	Playoffs
2014	2,395	–
2015	3,304	–
2016	1,470	–
2017	6,127	–
2018	6,380	7,609
2019	6,752	7,095
2020	N/A	N/A
2021	6,996	8,234
2022	7,358	–
2023	6,100	–
2024	6,267	–
2025	4,868	-

== Honors ==
- USL Championship
  - Champions: 2023
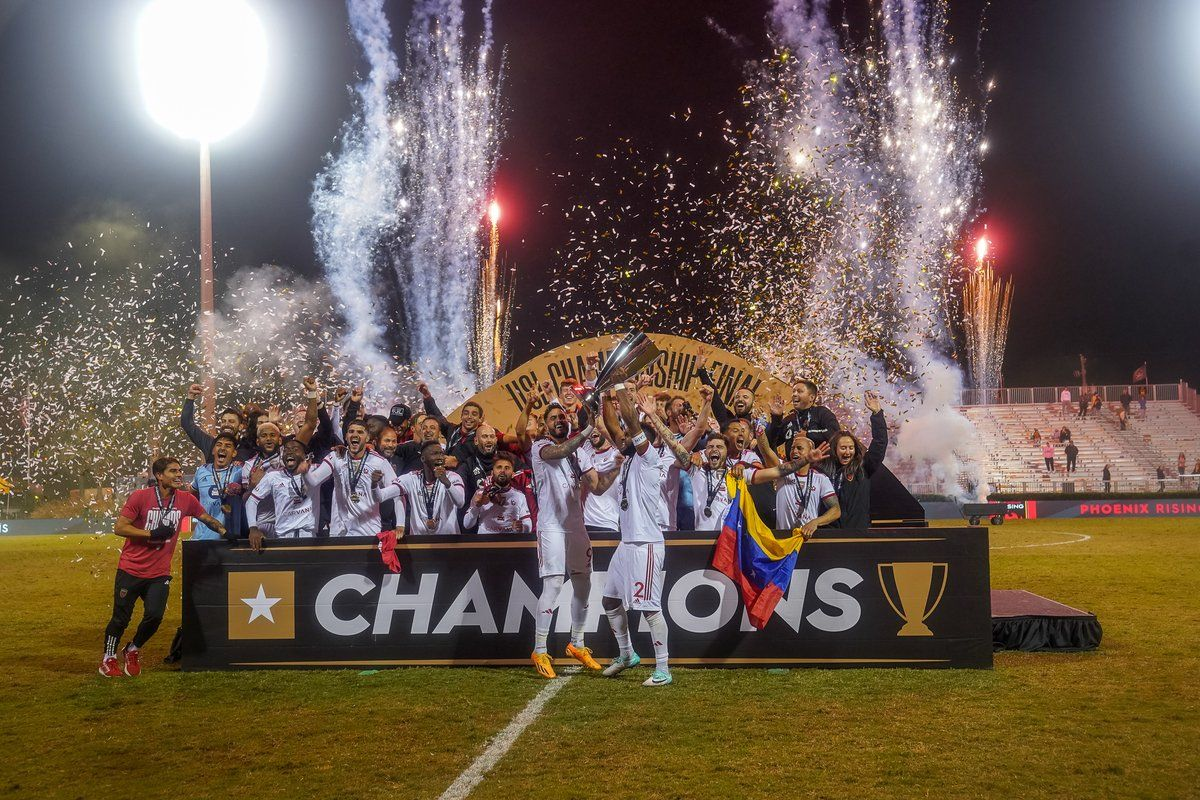
    Phoenix Rising - 2023 USL Championship champions
  - Runners-up: 2018
  - Finalist: 2020 (Note: Championship game canceled due to COVID-19)
- USL Championship Players' Shield
  - Champions: 2019
- USL Western Conference
  - Champions (Playoffs): 2018; 2020; 2023
  - Champions (Regular Season): 2019; 2021
- USL Western Conference Pacific Division
  - Champions: 2021
- USL Championship Playoffs
  - Appearances (7): 2017, 2018, 2019, 2020, 2021, 2023, 2024

=== Player honors ===
Year	Player	Country	Position	Honor
2014	Long Tan	China	Forward	All-League Second Team
2015	Long Tan	China	Forward	All-League First Team
2018	Solomon Asante	Ghana	Forward	All-League First Team
2019	Solomon Asante	Ghana	Forward	Most Valuable Player; All-League First Team
2019	Adam Jahn	United States	Forward	All-League First Team
2019	A.J. Cochran	United States	Defender	All-League Second Team
2019	Zac Lubin	United States	Goalkeeper	All-League Second Team
2020	Solomon Asante	Ghana	Forward	Most Valuable Player; All-League First Team
2020	Rufat Dadashov	Azerbaijan	Forward	All-League Second Team
2021	Santi Moar	Spain	Forward	All-League First Team
2021	Aodhan Quinn	United States	Midfielder	All-League First Team
2021	James Musa	New Zealand	Defender	All-League Second Team
2023	Danny Trejo	Mexico	Forward	All-League First Team
2024	Pape Mar Boye	Senegal	Defender	All-League Second Team
2025	Hope Avayevu	Senegal	Midfielder	All-League Second Team

=== Records ===
Most consecutive wins by a North American professional soccer club: (20 games / May 10, 2019 – September 14, 2019)

USL Championship:
Most Points – 78 (2019)
Most Wins – 24 (2019)
Most Goals – 89 (2019)
Goals Per Game – 2.62 (2019)
Assists (season) – Solomon Asante 17 (2019)
Saves (season) – Carl Woszczynski 130 (2015)

== Broadcasting ==
KASW-61, The CW affiliate in Phoenix, signed a deal to broadcast Phoenix Rising games including every USL Championship match home and away, starting in 2019. Josh Eastern did play-by-play and Devon Kerr provided analysis. The Rising Halftime Show was produced by KASW's sister station KNXV-15 and was hosted by Craig Fouhy. This arrangement lasted until 2021.

Games are also streamed live on ESPN+.

Arizona Sports 98.7 FM is the radio / digital station for Rising FC broadcasts. LA Mejor 106.5 FM & 1400 AM is the Spanish broadcaster for Rising FC matches.

On March 3, 2022, Rising FC signed an agreement with Bally Sports Arizona to broadcast 32 of 34 regular-season games for the 2022 season. There will be in-depth coverage of the team on Bally's social media platforms.

On January 25, 2023, Rising FC signed a three-year deal for television rights with Gray Television via Arizona's Family Sports. In October, 2025 Rising signed a three-year extension of its local TV contract with Arizona’s Family Sports.

Before 2019, games were broadcast on YouTube.

== Notes ==
Preceded by San Antonio FC	USL Championship winner 2023	Succeeded by Colorado Springs Switchbacks FC
