= 2023 USL Championship playoffs =

Tournament details
- Country: United States
- Dates: October 21 – November 12
- Teams: 16

Final positions
- Champions: Phoenix Rising FC
- Runners-up: Charleston Battery

Tournament statistics
- Matches played: 15
- Goals scored: 43 (2.87 per match)
- Attendance: 95,916 (6,394 per match)
- Top goal scorer(s): (Haiti) Ronaldo Damus (England) Cameron Lancaster (3 goals each)
- All statistics correct as of November 12, 2023.

The 2023 USL Championship playoffs (branded as the 2023 USL Championship Playoffs presented by Hisense for sponsorship reasons) was the post-season championship of the 2023 USL Championship. It was the thirteenth edition of the USL Championship playoffs. The playoffs began on October 21, and concluded with the USL Championship Final on November 12.

San Antonio FC were the defending title holders and were eliminated in the Conference Semi-finals by Sacramento Republic FC. Pittsburgh Riverhounds SC and the Tampa Bay Rowdies were the first teams to clinch a playoff berth which they both achieved on September 3 and subsequently both lost in the first round. Pittsburgh Riverhounds SC won the regular season and were eliminated in the Conference Quarterfinals by Detroit City FC.

The Charleston Battery and Phoenix Rising FC advanced to the Final after failing to make the postseason the previous year. A match Phoenix won after a penalty shoot-out for their first title.

== Format ==
The top eight teams in each conference qualified for the playoffs which was in a single-elimination, fixed bracket format. All playoff matches were streamed live on ESPN+ except the Championship final on ESPN2, ESPN Deportes, and SiriusXM FC.

== Conference standings ==
Eastern Conference

Pos	Team	Pld	Pts
1	Pittsburgh Riverhounds SC (S)	34	67
2	Tampa Bay Rowdies	34	63
3	Charleston Battery	34	59
4	Memphis 901 FC	34	52
5	Louisville City FC	34	50
6	Indy Eleven	34	49
7	Birmingham Legion FC	34	46
8	Detroit City FC	34	41
9	Miami FC	34	41
10	FC Tulsa	34	39
11	Loudoun United FC	34	25
12	Hartford Athletic	34	18

Source: USL Championship Standings
(S) Players' Shield winner

Western Conference

Pos	Team	Pld	Pts
1	Sacramento Republic FC	34	64
2	Orange County SC	34	57
3	San Diego Loyal SC	34	57
4	San Antonio FC	34	56
5	Colorado Springs Switchbacks FC	34	53
6	Phoenix Rising FC (C)	34	48
7	El Paso Locomotive FC	34	47
8	New Mexico United	34	46
9	Rio Grande Valley FC Toros	34	43
10	Oakland Roots SC	34	42
11	Monterey Bay FC	34	41
12	Las Vegas Lights FC	34	19

Source: USL Championship Standings
(C) Champions

== Bracket ==
Conference Quarterfinals; October 21–22	Conference Semifinals; October 27–28
E1	Pittsburgh Riverhounds SC	0
E8	Detroit City FC	1
E8	Detroit City FC	0
E5	Louisville City FC	4
E4	Memphis 901 FC	1 (4)
E5	Louisville City FC (p)	1 (5)
Eastern Conference
E3	Charleston Battery	5
E6	Indy Eleven	0
E3	Charleston Battery	2
E7	Birmingham Legion FC	1
E2	Tampa Bay Rowdies	0
E7	Birmingham Legion FC	3
W1	Sacramento Republic FC	1
W8	New Mexico United	0
W1	Sacramento Republic FC	3
W4	San Antonio FC	1
W4	San Antonio FC	1
W5	Colorado Springs Switchbacks	0
Western Conference
W3	San Diego Loyal SC	3
W6	Phoenix Rising FC (a.e.t.)	4
W6	Phoenix Rising FC (a.e.t.)	2
W2	Orange County SC	1
W2	Orange County SC	1
W7	El Paso Locomotive FC	0

Conference Finals; November 4
E5	Louisville City FC	1
E3	Charleston Battery	2
W1	Sacramento Republic FC	1
W6	Phoenix Rising FC	2

USL Championship Final; November 12
E3	Charleston Battery	1 (2)
W6	Phoenix Rising FC (p)	1 (3)

== Schedule ==
=== Conference Quarterfinals ===
October 21, 2023 East	Memphis 901 FC	1–1 (a.e.t.) (4–5 p)	Louisville City FC	Memphis, Tennessee
6:30 PM EDT	Lapa 1'; Paul (yellow card) 24'; Ward (yellow card) 62'; Kissiedou (yellow card) 73'; Careaga (yellow card) 118'	Report	Lancaster 18'; Semmle (yellow card) 24'; Perez (yellow card) 90+5'; McCabe (yellow card) 117'	Stadium: AutoZone Park; Attendance: 3,587; Referee: Elton García
	Penalties
	Hyndman (penalty scored); Molloy (penalty scored); Smith (penalty scored); Careaga (penalty scored); McFadden (penalty missed)		(penalty scored) Totsch; (penalty scored) Harris; (penalty scored) Mares; (penalty scored) McCabe; (penalty scored) Jimenez

October 21, 2023 East	Pittsburgh Riverhounds SC	0–1	Detroit City FC	Pittsburgh, Pennsylvania
7:00 PM EDT	Dossantos (yellow card) 15'; Dikwa (yellow card) 52'	Report	Lewis (yellow card) 4'; Amoo-Mensah (yellow card) 38'; Rodriguez (yellow card) 52'; Gasso 78'	Stadium: Highmark Stadium; Attendance: 6,123; Referee: Sergii Demianchuk

October 21, 2023 East	Tampa Bay Rowdies	0–3	Birmingham Legion FC	St. Petersburg, Florida
7:30 PM EDT	Lasso (yellow card) 39'; Jennings (yellow card) 45+1'	Report	Martínez (yellow card) 9'; Preston 41'; Nwegbo 57'; Kasim 77'	Stadium: Al Lang Stadium; Attendance: 5,249; Referee: Matthew Thompson

October 21, 2023 West	San Antonio FC	1–0	Colorado Springs Switchbacks	San Antonio, Texas
8:00 PM CDT	Garcia (yellow card) 19'; Hernández 55'; PC (yellow card) 82'	Report	Tejada (yellow card) 45'; Lacroix (yellow card) 60'; Mahoney (yellow card) 78'; Musa (yellow card) 90'	Stadium: Toyota Field; Attendance: 7,304; Referee: Alexis Da Silva

October 21, 2023 West	Sacramento Republic FC	1–0	New Mexico United	Sacramento, California
7:00 PM PDT	Donovan 13'; López (yellow card) 62'; Archimede (yellow card) 80'	Report		Stadium: Heart Health Park; Attendance: 11,569; Referee: Ricardo Fierro

October 21, 2023 West	Orange County SC	1–0	El Paso Locomotive FC	Irvine, California
7:30 PM PDT	Iloski 45+1'; Scott (yellow card) 87'	Report	Dollenmayer (yellow card) 29'; Sonupe (yellow card) 58'; Rose (yellow card) 75'; Petrović (yellow card) 86'; Díaz (red card) 90+3'; Calvillo (yellow card) 90+7'	Stadium: Championship Soccer Stadium; Attendance: 5,500; Referee: Natalie Simon

October 22, 2023 East	Charleston Battery	5–0	Indy Eleven	Mount Pleasant, South Carolina
4:00 PM EDT	Ycaza 12' (yellow card) 90'; Williams (yellow card) 16' (goal) 37'; Rodríguez 40'; Barajas 47'; Markanich 63'	Report	Boudadi (yellow card) 57'; Vázquez (yellow card) 72'; Diz Pe (yellow card) 76'; Lindley (yellow card) 83'	Stadium: Patriots Point Soccer Complex; Attendance: 2,972; Referee: Jeremy Scheer

October 22, 2023 West	San Diego Loyal SC	3–4 (a.e.t.)	Phoenix Rising FC	San Diego California
7:00 PM PDT	Damus 4', 25', 90+7' (pen.); Adams (yellow card) 45+2'	Report	Armenakas 19' (pen.); Trejo 42'; Formella 51', 119'; Harvey (yellow card) 57'; Arteaga (yellow card) 87'; Traore (yellow card) 90+5'; Fuenmayor (yellow card) 97'	Stadium: Torero Stadium; Attendance: 5,671; Referee: Elvis Osmanovic

=== Conference Semifinals ===
October 27, 2023 West	Sacramento Republic FC	3–1	San Antonio FC	Sacramento, California
7:30 PM PDT	Sanchez (yellow card) 22'; Cicerone 49'; Ross 69'; Viader 80'; Filipe (yellow card) 85'	Report	Taintor (yellow card) 27'; Nathan (yellow card) 74'; Oluwaseyi (yellow card) 83' (goal) 90+1'	Stadium: Heart Health Park; Attendance: 10,619; Referee: Elvis Osmanovic

October 28, 2023 East	Charleston Battery	2–1	Birmingham Legion FC	Mount Pleasant, South Carolina
7:00 PM EDT	Ycaza 17'; Dodson 68'	Report	Kasim 41'; Agudelo (yellow card) 61'; Rufe (yellow card) 70'; Lopez (yellow card) 86'	Stadium: Patriots Point Soccer Complex; Attendance: 2,762; Referee: Elton Garcia

October 28, 2023 East	Louisville City FC	4–0	Detroit City FC	Louisville, Kentucky
7:30 PM EDT	Lancaster 14' (pen.), 59'; Ownby 43'; Gonzalez 60'	Report	Bryant (yellow card) 14'	Stadium: Lynn Family Stadium; Attendance: 7,959; Referee: Ricardo Fierro

October 28, 2023 West	Orange County SC	1–2 (a.e.t.)	Phoenix Rising FC	Irvine, California
7:30 PM PDT	Amang 24'; Richards (yellow card) 51'	Report	Trejo 7'; Fuenmayor (yellow card) 103'; Uzochukwu (yellow card) 106'; Cuello 116'	Stadium: Championship Soccer Stadium; Attendance: 5,500; Referee: Calin Radosav

=== Conference Finals ===
November 4, 2023 East	Charleston Battery	2–1	Louisville City FC	Mount Pleasant, South Carolina
7:30 PM EST	Rodríguez 5' (yellow card) 69'; Williams 58' (pen.); Allan (yellow card) 90+4'	Report	Ownby (yellow card) 4'; Moguel (yellow card) 83' (red card) 86'; Adams 90'; Cruz (yellow card) 90+1'	Stadium: Patriots Point Soccer Complex; Attendance: 4,438; Referee: Elvis Osmanovic

November 4, 2023 West	Sacramento Republic FC	1–2	Phoenix Rising FC	Sacramento, California
7:00 PM PST	Cicerone 31'; Keko (yellow card) 71'	Report	Traore (yellow card) 17'; King (yellow card) 40'; Munjoma (yellow card) 69'; Donovan 80' (o.g.); Stenberg (yellow card) 88'; Cuello 90+2'; Harvey (yellow card) 90+6'; Formella (yellow card) 90+6'	Stadium: Heart Health Park; Attendance: 11,569; Referee: Ricardo Fierro

=== USL Championship Final ===
November 12, 2023	Charleston Battery	1–1 (a.e.t.) (2–3 p)	Phoenix Rising FC	Mount Pleasant, South Carolina
7:00 PM EST	Markanich 36'; Avila (yellow card) 72'	Report	Traore (yellow card) 11'; Harvey (yellow card) 72'; Fuenmayor (yellow card) 73'; Cuello (yellow card) 80'; Stenberg 90'; Zambrano (yellow card) 115'; Guerra (yellow card) 117'	Stadium: Patriots Point Soccer Complex; Attendance: 5,094; Referee: Elton Garcia
	Penalties
	Paterson (penalty scored); Williams (penalty scored); Archer (penalty missed); Allan (penalty missed); Dodson (penalty missed)		(penalty missed) Cuello; (penalty missed) Krutzen; (penalty scored) Zambrano; (penalty scored) Gallardo; (penalty scored) Arteaga

Championship Game MVP: (Argentina) Rocco Ríos Novo (PHX)

== Top goalscorers ==
Rank	Player	Club	Goals
1	(Haiti) Ronaldo Damus	San Diego Loyal SC	3
1	(England) Cameron Lancaster	Louisville City FC	3
3	(United States) Russell Cicerone	Sacramento Republic FC	2
3	(Argentina) Emil Cuello	Phoenix Rising FC	2
3	(Poland) Dariusz Formella	Phoenix Rising FC	2
3	(Ghana) Prosper Kasim	Birmingham Legion FC	2
3	(United States) Nick Markanich	Charleston Battery	2
3	(Mexico) Arturo Rodríguez	Charleston Battery	2
3	(Mexico) Danny Trejo	Phoenix Rising FC	2
3	(Sierra Leone) Augustine Williams	Charleston Battery	2
3	(United States) Emilio Ycaza	Charleston Battery	2
