= 2023 Phoenix Rising FC season =

Phoenix Rising FC
2023 season
- Owners: List: Berke Bakay Alex Zheng Tim Riester Mark Detmer Brett M. Johnson Didier Drogba Brandon McCarthy Diplo Pete Wentz David Rappaport Dave Stearns Rick Hauser William Kraus Kevin Kusatsu Mark Leber Jim Scussel Vincere Capital (Baer Fisher) Christopher Yeung
- Manager: Juan Guerra
- Stadium: Phoenix Rising Soccer Stadium
- USL Championship: 6th, Western Conference
- USLC Playoffs: Champions
- U.S. Open Cup: 3rd Round
- Top goalscorer: Danny Trejo (19)
- Highest home attendance: 10,437 (April 1 vs San Diego Loyal SC) (Club Record)
- Lowest home attendance: 4,530 (October 7 vs New Mexico United)
- Average home league attendance: 6,100 (4 of 17 results missing)
- Biggest win: 6–0 (July 1 vs Memphis 901 FC) (Ties team record)
- Biggest defeat: 0–4 (July 26 vs Sacramento Republic FC)
Home colors	Away colors

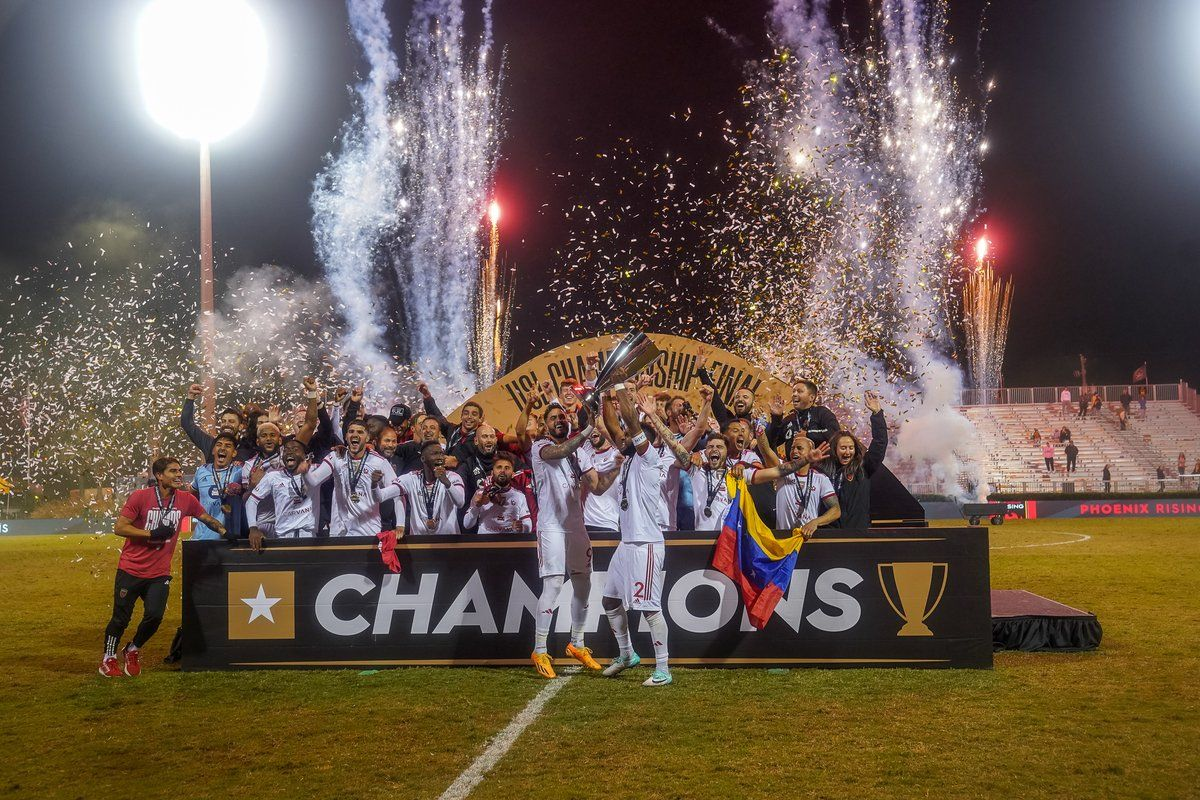
Phoenix Rising - 2023 USL Championship champions

The 2023 Phoenix Rising FC season was the club's tenth season in the USL Championship and their seventh as Rising FC. This season ended with Phoenix Rising winning their first USL Championship through the USLC Playoffs by winning 3–2 on penalty shootouts after a 1–1 tie after extra time against the Charleston Battery.

== Competitions ==
=== Friendlies ===
All times from this point on Mountain Standard Time (UTC-07:00)

February 8, 2023 Preseason	Phoenix Rising FC	1–2	Colorado Springs Switchbacks	Tucson, Arizona
	Trialist 74'		Williams 00'; Echevarria 65'	Stadium: Kino North Stadium
Note: Closed door scrimmage

February 11, 2023 Preseason	Phoenix Rising FC	5–2	Grand Canyon University	Phoenix, Arizona
10:30 AM MST	Trialist 22'; Varela 38'; Arteaga 47', 70'; Cuello 62'		? 1'; ? 87'	Stadium: GCU Stadium
Note: Closed door scrimmage

February 18, 2023 Preseason	Phoenix Rising FC	2–4	Sporting Kansas City	Phoenix, Arizona
	Arteaga 21'; Cuello 34'		? 33'; ? 51'; ? 67'; ? 81'	Stadium: GCU Stadium
Note: Closed door scrimmage

February 22, 2023 Preseason	Atlante FC (Mexico)	1–1	(United States) Phoenix Rising FC	Mexico City, Mexico
9:00 AM MST	Ochoa 32'	PHX Report	Zambrano 27'	Stadium: Estadio Ciudad de los Deportes
Note: Closed door scrimmage; 70 minute game

February 25, 2023 Preseason	Pumas Tabasco (Mexico)	0–0	(United States) Phoenix Rising FC	Coyoacán, Mexico City, Mexico
		PHX Report		Stadium: La Cantera
Note: Closed door scrimmage; 70 minute game

March 4, 2023 Preseason	Phoenix Rising FC	3–2	Grand Canyon University	Phoenix, Arizona
10:00 AM MST	Arteaga 10'; Gallardo 23'; Cuello 35'		? 54'; ? 69' (pen.)	Stadium: GCU Stadium

=== USL Championship ===
Overall								Home						Away					
Pld	W	D	L	GF	GA	GD	Pts	W	D	L	GF	GA	GD	W	D	L	GF	GA	GD
34	12	12	10	54	41	+13	48	7	7	3	38	18	+20	5	5	7	16	23	−7

Source: Match reports

==== Results by round ====
Round	1	2	3	4	5	6	7	8	9	10	11	12	13	14	15	16	17	18	19	20	21	22	23	24	25	26	27	28	29	30	31	32	33	34
Ground	A	A	H	A	H	A	H	A	H	A	H	A	H	H	A	A	H	A	H	A	A	H	H	A	A	H	H	A	H	H	A	H	H	A
Result	D	L	D	W	D	D	W	L	W	W	L	L	D	D	W	D	W	L	D	L	W	L	W	L	W	W	W	D	W	D	D	D	L	L
Position	7	11	12	9	10	8	7	8	8	6	7	8	8	8	8	8	6	7	10	10	8	8	7	7	7	6	5	5	4	5	4	4	6	6

Updated to match(es) played on October 7, 2023. Source: Match reports
A = Away; H = Home; W = Win; D = Draw; L = Loss

==== Matches ====
March 11, 2023 1	Charleston Battery	1–1	Phoenix Rising FC	Mount Pleasant, South Carolina
5:30 PM MST	Booth 60'	PHX Report; CHS Report	Traore (yellow card) 52'; Zambrano (yellow card) 66'; Trejo 74'; Arteaga (yellow card) 89'	Stadium: Patriots Point Soccer Complex; Attendance: 3,513; Referee: Thomas Snyder

March 19, 2023 2	San Diego Loyal SC	3–0	Phoenix Rising FC	San Diego, California
3:00 PM MST	Moon (yellow card) 37'; Conway 44'; Damus 74'; Collier (yellow card) 82'; Riley (yellow card) 84'; Bodily 90'	PHX Report; SDG Report	Varela (yellow card) 12'; Zambrano (yellow card) 53'; King (yellow card) 80'	Stadium: Torero Stadium; Attendance: 5,114; Referee: Matthew Corrigan

April 1, 2023 3	Phoenix Rising FC	2–2	San Diego Loyal SC	Phoenix, Arizona
7:30 PM MST	Arteaga (yellow card) 3' (goal) 35', 63'; Cuello (yellow card) 44'; Krutzen (yellow card) 45+2'; Harvey (yellow card) 82'; Fuenmayor (yellow card) 90+1'	PHX Report; SDG Report	Moon 72'; Damus 80'; Martin (yellow card) 83'	Stadium: Phoenix Rising Soccer Stadium; Attendance: 10,437; Referee: Elton Garcia

April 9, 2023 4	Birmingham Legion FC	1–2	Phoenix Rising FC	Birmingham, Alabama
2:30 PM MST	Alves 59'	PHX Report; BHM Report	Trejo 58'; Harvey 66'	Stadium: Protective Stadium; Attendance: 4,750; Referee: John "JC" Griggs

April 15, 2023 5	Phoenix Rising FC	1–1	Monterey Bay FC	Phoenix, Arizona
7:30 PM MST	Lambert 67'; Trejo (yellow card) 82'	PHX Report; MB Report	Yoseke (yellow card) 35'; Dixon 63' (pen.); Robinson (yellow card) 66'	Stadium: Phoenix Rising Soccer Stadium; Attendance: 6,125; Referee: Katja Koroleva

April 22, 2023 6	San Antonio FC	1–1	Phoenix Rising FC	San Antonio, Texas
5:30 PM MST	Parano 59' (pen.); Gomez (yellow card) 84'	PHX Report; SAN Report	Harvey (yellow card) 20' (yellow-red card) 56'; Trejo 49'; Fuenmayor (yellow card) 57'; Munjoma (yellow card) 76'; Zambrano (yellow card) 90+5'	Stadium: Toyota Field; Attendance: 7,585; Referee: Sergii Demianchuk

April 29, 2023 7	Phoenix Rising FC	3–1	Loudoun United FC	Phoenix, Arizona
7:30 PM MST	Hernández 33'; Arteaga 36'; Lambert (yellow card) 44'; Conway (yellow card) 89'; Njie 90+1' (yellow card) 90+2'	PHX Report; LDN Report	Lambert 45+1' (o.g.); Williamson (yellow card) 90+3'	Stadium: Phoenix Rising Soccer Stadium; Attendance: 7,334; Referee: Olvin Oliva

May 6, 2023 8	Tampa Bay Rowdies	2–0	Phoenix Rising FC	St. Petersburg, Florida
4:30 PM MST	Williams 10'; Dennis 45+1'	PHX Report; TBR Report	Conway (red card) 78'	Stadium: Al Lang Stadium; Attendance: 5,000; Referee: Elton Garcia

May 13, 2023 9	Phoenix Rising FC	3–1	Hartford Athletic	Phoenix, Arizona
7:30 PM MST	Trejo 5'; Njie (yellow card) 10'; Zambrano (yellow card) 70'; Harvey 73'; Arteaga 81'; Lambert (yellow card) 84'	PHX Report; HFD Report	Logue (yellow card) 2'; Sheldon (yellow card) 17'; McGlynn (yellow card) 19'; Edwards 44' (pen.); Hodge (yellow card) 61'; Barrera (yellow card) 80'	Stadium: Phoenix Rising Soccer Stadium; Referee: Jonathan Bilinski

May 20, 2023 10	Orange County SC	0–1	Phoenix Rising FC	Irvine, California
7:00 PM MST	Doghman (yellow card) 50'; Norris (yellow card) 81'; Nakkim (yellow card) 90+3'	PHX Report; OCO Report	Fuenmayor (yellow card) 5'; Arteaga 67'	Stadium: Championship Soccer Stadium; Attendance: 4,301; Referee: Alexis Da Silva

May 26, 2023 11	Phoenix Rising FC	0–1	Las Vegas Lights	Phoenix, Arizona
7:30 PM MST	Fuenmayor (yellow card) 68'	PHX Report	Zali (yellow card) 67'; Torres 78'	Stadium: Phoenix Rising Soccer Stadium; Referee: Gerald Flores

June 3, 2023 12	Pittsburgh Riverhounds SC	1–0	Phoenix Rising FC	Pittsburgh, Pennsylvania
4:00 PM MST	Ordoñez 22' (yellow card) 62'; DeShields (yellow card) 43'; Griffin (yellow card) 73'	PHX Report; PGH Report		Stadium: Highmark Stadium; Attendance: 5,011; Referee: Elton Garcia

June 10, 2023 13	Phoenix Rising FC	2–2	Oakland Roots SC	Phoenix, Arizona
7:30 PM MST	Fuenmayor (yellow card) 45+1'; Varela 58'; Zambrano (yellow card) 84'; Arteaga 89'; Njie (yellow card) 90+4'; Hernández (yellow card) 90+4'	PHX Report; OAK Report	Formella 9'; Diaz (yellow card) 21'; Mfeka (yellow card) 31' (goal) 66'; Barbir (yellow card) 31'; Tamacas (yellow card) 60'; Matsoso (yellow card) 74'; Cedeno (yellow card) 90+6'	Stadium: Phoenix Rising Soccer Stadium; Attendance: 5,748; Referee: Malik Badawi

June 17, 2023 14	Phoenix Rising FC	2–2	Louisville City FC	Phoenix, Arizona
7:30 PM MST	Harvey 5'; Krutzen (yellow card) 45+2'; Armenakas (yellow card) 53'; Arteaga 74' (pen.)	PHX Report; LOU Report	Totsch 42' (pen.); Mares 57'; Dia (yellow card) 73'	Stadium: Phoenix Rising Soccer Stadium; Attendance: 6,510; Referee: Sergii Demianchuk

June 21, 2023 15	New Mexico United	1–3	Phoenix Rising FC	Albuquerque, New Mexico
6:00 PM MST	Hamilton (yellow card) 1'; Seymore (yellow card) 49'; Moreno 51'	PHX Report; NMU Report	Trejo 31'; Armenakas 53'; Harvey (yellow card) 59'; Njie (yellow card) 88'; Arteaga 88'	Stadium: Isotopes Park; Attendance: 7,864; Referee: Ricardo Fierro

June 24, 2023 16	Oakland Roots SC	1–1	Phoenix Rising FC	Hayward, California
7:00 PM MST	Formella 82' (yellow card) 83'; Rodriguez (yellow card) 85'; Reid (yellow card) 90+1'	PHX Report; OAK Report	Arteaga (yellow card) 28' (goal) 90+3'; Trejo (yellow card) 36'; Torres (yellow card) 57'; Munjoma (yellow card) 57'	Stadium: Pioneer Stadium; Attendance: 3,002; Referee: Abdou Ndiaye

July 1, 2023 17	Phoenix Rising FC	6–0	Memphis 901 FC	Phoenix, Arizona
8:00 PM MST	Munjoma 13'; Harvey 22'; Arteaga 43'; Gallardo 56'; Trejo 59'; Varela 88'	PHX Report; MEM Report	Smith (yellow card) 20'	Stadium: Phoenix Rising Soccer Stadium; Attendance: 6,254; Referee: Brandon Stevis

July 8, 2023 18	Miami FC	2–1	Phoenix Rising FC	Miami, Florida
4:00 PM MST	Murphy 15'; Stanley (yellow card) 45+2'; Sorto (yellow card) 45+2' (goal) 55'; Segbers (yellow card) 84'	PHX Report; MIA Report	Harvey (yellow card) 28'; King (yellow card) 41'; Trejo 44'; Arteaga (yellow card) 45+2'; Zambrano (yellow card) 79'	Stadium: Riccardo Silva Stadium; Attendance: 1,248; Referee: Austin Saini

July 22, 2023 19	Phoenix Rising FC	1–1	Colorado Springs Switchbacks	Phoenix, Arizona
7:30 PM MST	Anguiano (yellow card) 27'; Zambrano (yellow card) 42'; Trejo 44'; Guerra (yellow card) 90+5'; Arteaga (yellow card) 90+7'	PHX Report; COS Report	Tejada 42' (yellow card) 84'; Echevarria (yellow card) 73'; Hogan (yellow card) 81'	Stadium: Phoenix Rising Soccer Stadium; Referee: Calin Radosav

July 26, 2023 20	Sacramento Republic FC	4–0	Phoenix Rising FC	Sacramento, California
	Keko 20'; Cicerone 28' (yellow card) 57'; Lewis 38'; Gurr 38'; Archimède (yellow card) 78'	PHX Report; SAC Report	Krutzen (yellow card) 58'; Fuenmayor (yellow card) 90'	Stadium: Heart Health Park; Attendance: 9,448; Referee: Elvis Osmanovic

July 29, 2023 21	Monterey Bay FC	0–2	Phoenix Rising FC	Seaside, California
7:00 PM MST	Okoli (yellow card) 74'		Arteaga 23'; Trejo 45+2'; Traore (yellow card) 86'	Stadium: Cardinale Stadium; Attendance: 3,578; Referee: Olvin Oliva

August 5, 2023 22	Phoenix Rising FC	1–2	San Antonio FC	Phoenix, Arizona
8:00 PM MST	Arteaga (red card) 13'; Trejo 20'; Harvey (yellow card) 55'; Novo (yellow card) 63'	PHX Report; SAN Report	PC (yellow card) 39'; Dillon 86'; Oluwaseyi 90+3'	Stadium: Phoenix Rising Soccer Stadium; Referee: Ricardo Fierro

August 12, 2023 23	Phoenix Rising FC	5–0	El Paso Locomotive FC	Phoenix, Arizona
8:00 PM MST	Munjoma 21' (yellow card) 61'; Zambrano (yellow card) 30'; Armenakas (yellow card) 43'; Trejo 44', 70'; Formella 85' (pen.); Torres 88'; Uzochukwu (yellow card) 89'	PHX Report; ELP Report	Díaz (yellow card) 58'; McCue (yellow card) 60'	Stadium: Phoenix Rising Soccer Stadium; Attendance: 5,775; Referee: Alexis Da Silva

August 19, 2023 24	Rio Grande Valley FC	1–0	Phoenix Rising FC	Edinburg, Texas
5:00 PM MST	Galindrez 17'; Cabezas (yellow card) 43' (yellow-red card) 45+2'; Cabrera (yellow card) 90'; Torres (yellow card) 90+5'	PHX Report	Novo (yellow card) 45+3'; Harvey (yellow card) 80'; Torres (yellow card) 90+2'	Stadium: H-E-B Park; Attendance: 3,320; Referee: Nabil Bensalah

August 26, 2023 25	Las Vegas Lights FC	2–3	Phoenix Rising FC	Las Vegas, Nevada
7:30 PM MST	Rios 45+3', 61'	PHX Report	Arteaga 53' (yellow card) 90+4'; Trejo 81'; Armenakas 82'	Stadium: Cashman Field; Attendance: 2,720; Referee: Thomas Snyder

August 30, 2023 26	Phoenix Rising FC	2–1	Sacramento Republic FC	Phoenix, Arizona
7:30 PM MST	Zambrano (yellow card) 24'; King (yellow card) 38'; Arteaga 60'; Trejo 65'; Traore (yellow card) 71'; Hernández (yellow card) 88'; Harvey (yellow card) 90+3'	PHX Report; SAC Report	Sanchez (yellow card) 19'; Wiedt 84'	Stadium: Phoenix Rising Soccer Stadium; Attendance: 4,621; Referee: Sergii Demianchuk

September 2, 2023 27	Phoenix Rising FC	2–0	Rio Grande Valley FC	Phoenix, Arizona
7:30 PM MST	Trejo 2'; Arteaga 39'; Torres (yellow card) 56'; Traore (yellow card) 62'; Stenberg (yellow card) 68'; Guerra (yellow card) 86'	PHX Report	Davila (yellow card) 36'; Nodarse (yellow card) 45'; Ruiz (yellow card) 55'	Stadium: Phoenix Rising Soccer Stadium; Attendance: 5,142; Referee: Melvin Rivas

September 9, 2023 28	FC Tulsa	0–0	Phoenix Rising FC	Tulsa, Oklahoma
5:30 PM MST	Yosef (yellow card) 50'; Fernandez (yellow card) 72'	PHX Report; TUL Report	Uzochukwu (yellow card) 90+4'	Stadium: ONEOK Field; Attendance: 4,821; Referee: Matthew Corrigan

September 16, 2023 29	Phoenix Rising FC	5–0	Detroit City FC	Phoenix, Arizona
7:30 PM MST	Trejo 45+1', 65'; Armenakas 56'; Arteaga 81'; Zambrano (yellow card) 86'; Formella 90'	PHX Report; DET Report	Lewis (yellow card) 80'	Stadium: Phoenix Rising Soccer Stadium; Attendance: 5,887; Referee: Joshua Encarnación

September 20, 2023 30	Phoenix Rising FC	1–1	Indy Eleven	Phoenix, Arizona
7:30 PM MST	Uzochukwu (yellow card) 16'; Arteaga (yellow card) 40'; Fuenmayor (yellow card) 62'; Harvey 80'; Hernández (yellow card) 90+2'	PHX Report; IND Report	Pinho (yellow card) 31'; Blake (yellow card) 75'; Diz Pe 90+5'	Stadium: Phoenix Rising Soccer Stadium; Attendance: 4,674; Referee: Abdou Ndiaye

September 23, 2023 31	El Paso Locomotive	1–1	Phoenix Rising FC	El Paso, Texas
	Kostyshyn (yellow card) 40'; Gómez 56' (yellow card) 80'; McCue (yellow card) 73'	PHX Report; ELP Report	Traore (yellow card) 69'; Harvey 90+1'	Stadium: Southwest University Park; Attendance: 6,708; Referee: Nabil Bensalah

September 30, 2023 32	Phoenix Rising FC	1–1	Orange County SC	Phoenix, Arizona
7:30 PM MST	Hernández (yellow card) 70'; Traore (yellow card) 84'; Cuello 85'	PHX Report	Iloski 61'; Fox (yellow card) 76'; Powers (yellow card) 84'	Stadium: Phoenix Rising Soccer Stadium; Attendance: 6,440; Referee: Matthew Thompson

October 7, 2023 33	Phoenix Rising FC	1–2	New Mexico United	Phoenix, Arizona
7:30 PM MST	Novo (yellow card) 53'; Arteaga (yellow card) 59'; Trejo (yellow card) 59'; Stenberg (yellow card) 79'; Fuenmayor (yellow card) 82'; Formella 89'	PHX Report; NMU Report	Moreno 52' (yellow card) 74'; Seymore (yellow card) 53'; Swartz (yellow card) 66'; Portillo (yellow card) 70' (goal) 83' (pen.); Hamilton (yellow card) 90+5'; Thomas (yellow card) 90+8'	Stadium: Phoenix Rising Soccer Stadium; Attendance: 4,530; Referee: Elijio Arreguin

October 14, 2023 34	Colorado Springs Switchbacks	2–0	Phoenix Rising FC	Colorado Springs, Colorado
	Tejada 12'; Henríquez 29' (yellow card) 34'; Chapman (yellow card) 34'	PHX Report	Fuenmayor (yellow card) 90+2'	Stadium: Weidner Field; Attendance: 8,023; Referee: John Griggs

==== Group table ====
Pos	Team	Pld	W	L	T	GF	GA	GD	Pts	Qualification
4	San Antonio FC	34	14	6	14	63	38	+25	56	Playoffs
5	Colorado Springs Switchbacks FC	34	16	13	5	49	42	+7	53	Playoffs
6	Phoenix Rising FC (C)	34	12	10	12	54	41	+13	48	Playoffs
7	El Paso Locomotive FC	34	13	13	8	41	51	−10	47	Playoffs
8	New Mexico United	34	13	14	7	51	49	+2	46	Playoffs

Source: USL Championship Standings
Rules for classification: 1) head-to-head points; 2) head-to-head goal differential; 3) points-per game within conference; 4) total wins; 5) total goal differential; 6) total goals scored; 7) points earned against top four Conference finishers; 8) disciplinary points; 9) coin toss or drawing of lots
(C) Champions

=== U.S. Open Cup ===
As a member of the USL Championship, Phoenix Rising entered the tournament proper in the Second Round.

April 5. 2023 Second Round	Phoenix Rising FC	1–0	Greenville Triumph SC	Phoenix, Arizona
7:30 PM MST	Harvey 21'	PHX Report; GVL Report	Polak (yellow card) 52'	Stadium: Phoenix Rising Soccer Stadium; Attendance: 5,000; Referee: Turan Ozdemir

April 26. 2023 Third Round	New Mexico United	2–1	Phoenix Rising FC	Albuquerque, New Mexico
6:00 PM MST	Hurst 42'; Suggs (yellow card) 45'; Portillo (yellow card) 45+7'; Dolling 87'	PHX Report; NMU Report	King (yellow card) 45'; Njie (red card) 45+5'; Krutzen (yellow card) 45+7'; Fuenmayor (yellow card) 45+7'; Harvey 77'; Munjoma (yellow card) 85'; Hernández (yellow card) 90+6'	Stadium: Isotopes Park; Attendance: 4,126; Referee: William Hale

=== USL Championship Playoffs ===
==== Conference Playoffs ====
October 22, 2023 Quarterfinals	San Diego Loyal SC	3–4 (a.e.t.)	Phoenix Rising FC	San Diego, California
7:30 pm PDT	Damus 4', 25', 90+7' (pen.); Adams (yellow card) 45+2'	PHX Report; SDG Report	Armenakas 19' (pen.); Trejo 42'; Formella 51', 119'; Harvey (yellow card) 57'; Arteaga (yellow card) 87'; Traore (yellow card) 90+5'; Fuenmayor (yellow card) 97'	Stadium: Torero Stadium; Attendance: 5,671; Referee: Elvis Osmanovic

October 28, 2023 Semifinals	Orange County SC	1–2 (a.e.t.)	Phoenix Rising FC	Irvine, California
7:30 pm PDT	Amang 24'; Richards (yellow card) 51'	PHX Report; OCO Report	Trejo 7'; Fuenmayor (yellow card) 103'; Uzochukwu (yellow card) 106'; Cuello 116'	Stadium: Championship Soccer Stadium; Attendance: 5,500; Referee: Calin Radosav

November 4, 2023 Final	Sacramento Republic FC	1–2	Phoenix Rising FC	Sacramento, California
7:00 pm PST	Cicerone 31'; Keko (yellow card) 71'	PHX Report; SAC Report	Traore (yellow card) 17'; King (yellow card) 40'; Munjoma (yellow card) 69'; Donovan 80' (o.g.); Stenberg (yellow card) 88'; Cuello 90+2'; Harvey (yellow card) 90+6'; Formella (yellow card) 90+6'	Stadium: Heart Health Park; Attendance: 11,569; Referee: Ricardo Fierro

==== USL Championship Final ====
November 12, 2023 USL Final	Charleston Battery	1–1 (a.e.t.) (2–3 p)	Phoenix Rising FC	Mount Pleasant, South Carolina
7:00 PM EST	Markanich 36'; Avila (yellow card) 72'	PHX Report; CHS Report	Traore (yellow card) 11'; Harvey (yellow card) 72'; Fuenmayor (yellow card) 73'; Cuello (yellow card) 80'; Stenberg 90'; Zambrano (yellow card) 115'; Guerra (yellow card) 117'	Stadium: Patriots Point Soccer Complex; Attendance: 5,094; Referee: Elton Garcia
	Penalties
	Paterson (penalty scored); Williams (penalty scored); Archer (penalty missed); Allan (penalty missed); Dodson (penalty missed)		(penalty missed) Cuello; (penalty missed) Krutzen; (penalty scored) Zambrano; (penalty scored) Gallardo; (penalty scored) Arteaga

== Roster ==
No.	Name	Nationality	Position(s)	Date of birth (age)	Signed in	Previous club
Goalkeepers
1	Rocco Ríos Novo	(Argentina)	GK	June 4, 2002 (age 24)	2023	(Argentina) CA Lanús (loan)
22	Patrick Rakovsky	(Germany)	GK	June 2, 1993 (age 33)	2023	(United States) Orange County SC
Defenders
2	Darnell King	(United States)	DF	September 23, 1990 (age 36)	2021	(United States) Nashville SC
3	John Stenberg	(Sweden)	DF	October 12, 1992 (age 34)	2023	(Sweden) Östers IF
4	Daniel Krutzen	(Netherlands)	DF	September 16, 1996 (age 30)	2023	(Canada) Forge FC
5	Mohamed Traore	(Senegal)	DF	August 15, 2002 (age 24)	2023	(United States) Los Angeles FC (loan)
6	Baboucarr Njie	(The Gambia)	DF	June 5, 1995 (age 31)	2022	(United States) Rio Grande Valley FC
15	Henry Uzochukwu	(Nigeria)	DF	January 22, 1999 (age 27)	2022	(Finland) KuPs
19	Niall Dunn	(United States)	DF	October 18, 2004 (age 22)	2021	(United States) Phoenix Rising Academy
23	Eddie Munjoma	(United States)	DF	July 18, 1998 (age 28)	2023	(United States) FC Dallas
30	Alejandro Fuenmayor	(Venezuela)	DF	August 29, 1996 (age 30)	2022	(United States) Oakland Roots SC
35	Santi Hanus	(United States)	DF	April 8, 2005 (age 21)	2023	(United States) Phoenix Rising Academy
Midfielders
8	José Hernández	(Mexico)	MF	April 12, 1996 (age 30)	2022	(United States) Oakland Roots SC
10	Federico Varela	(Argentina)	MF	May 7, 1996 (age 30)	2022	(Bulgaria) CSKA Sofia
13	Carlos Anguiano	(United States)	MF	September 13, 1999 (age 27)	2022	(United States) Tacoma Defiance
14	Emil Cuello	(Argentina)	MF	January 2, 1997 (age 29)	2023	(United States) Sacramento Republic FC
16	Gabriel Torres	(Brazil)	MF	August 1, 1996 (age 30)	2022	(United States) FC Tulsa
21	Panos Armenakas	(Australia)	MF	August 5, 1998 (age 28)	2023	(United States) Loudoun United FC
26	Renzo Zambrano	(Venezuela)	MF	August 26, 1994 (age 32)	2022	(Armenia) FC Pyunik
27	Kevon Lambert	(Jamaica)	MF	March 22, 1997 (age 29)	2021	(Jamaica) Montego Bay United
29	Dariusz Formella	(Poland)	MF	October 21, 1995 (age 31)	2023	(United States) Oakland Roots SC
33	Joel Torbic	(United States)	MF	October 14, 2005 (age 21)	2023	(United States) Phoenix Rising Academy
36	Efetobo Aror	(United States)	MF	September 26, 2005 (age 21)	2023	(United States) Phoenix Rising Academy
45	Jack Ramirez	(United States)	MF	October 10, 2006 (age 20)	2023	(United States) Phoenix Rising Academy
62	David Landis	(United States)	MF	March 3, 2006 (age 20)	2023	(United States) Phoenix Rising Academy
67	Carlos Harvey	(Panama)	MF	February 3, 2000 (age 26)	2023	(United States) LA Galaxy
Forwards
7	Erickson Gallardo	(Venezuela)	FW	July 26, 1996 (age 30)	2022	(Venezuela) Zamora FC
9	Manuel Arteaga	(Venezuela)	FW	June 17, 1994 (age 32)	2022	(United States) Indy Eleven
17	Danny Trejo	(Mexico)	FW	April 29, 1998 (age 28)	2023	(United States) Los Angeles FC
28	Jackson Conway	(United States)	FW	December 3, 2001 (age 24)	2023	(United States) Atlanta United FC (loan)
40	Liam Mullins	(United States)	FW	July 15, 2005 (age 21)	2023	(United States) Phoenix Rising Academy

Phoenix Rising Academy contract.

== Player transactions ==
=== Loan in ===
Start date	End date	Position	No.	Player	From club	Ref.
January 24, 2023	End of Season	Goalkeeper	1	(Argentina) Rocco Ríos Novo	(Argentina) CA Lanús	
February 28, 2023	End of Season	Defender	5	(Senegal) Mohamed Traore	(United States) Los Angeles FC	
March 17, 2023	June 9, 2023	Forward	28	(United States) Jackson Conway	(United States) Atlanta United FC	

=== Loan out ===
Start date	End date	Position	No.	Player	To club	Ref.
March 7, 2023	August 2, 2023	Defender	3	(Sweden) John Stenberg	(Sweden) Östers IF	

=== Transfer In ===
Date	Position	No.	Player	From club	Ref.
June 2, 2023	Midfielder	21	(Australia) Panos Armenakas	(United States) Loudoun United FC	
July 25, 2023	Midfielder	29	(Poland) Dariusz Formella	(United States) Oakland Roots SC	

=== Transfer Out ===
Date	Position	No.	Player	To club	Ref.
July 25, 2023	Defender	6	(The Gambia) Baboucarr Njie	(United States) Oakland Roots SC	
August 16, 2023	Defender	27	(Jamaica) Kevon Lambert	(United States) Real Salt Lake	

== Statistics ==
As of November 12, 2023
(Regular Season & Playoffs)

#	Pos.	Name	GP	GS	Min.	Goals	Assists	A yellow rectangle, denoting the yellow penalty card shown to a player being cautioned	A red rectangle, denoting the red penalty card shown to a player being sent off
17	FW	(Mexico) Danny Trejo	37	34	3129	19	7	4	0
9	FW	(Venezuela) Manuel Arteaga	37	31	2801	15	7	10	1
67	MF	(Panama) Carlos Harvey	34	29	2639	6	6	10	1
29	FW	(Poland) Dariusz Formella	17	8	840	5	0	1	0
21	FW	(Australia) Panos Armenakas	27	23	1936	4	6	2	0
14	MF	(Argentina) Emil Cuello	21	5	629	3	2	3	0
23	DF	(United States) Eddie Munjoma	36	27	2551	2	2	4	0
10	MF	(Argentina) Fede Varela	26	15	1140	2	2	1	0
8	MF	(Mexico) José Hernández	34	24	2075	1	1	4	0
3	DF	(Sweden) John Stenberg	17	16	1541	1	0	3	0
27	MF	(Jamaica) Kevon Lambert	15	15	1349	1	0	3	0
7	FW	(Venezuela) Erickson Gallardo	21	9	996	1	5	0	0
16	MF	(Brazil) Gabriel Torres	16	8	708	1	5	3	0
6	DF	(The Gambia) Baboucarr Njie	19	4	579	1	0	5	0
30	DF	(Venezuela) Alejandro Fuenmayor	35	33	2986	0	0	13	0
26	MF	(Venezuela) Renzo Zambrano	35	29	2747	0	2	12	0
4	DF	(Netherlands) Daniel Krutzen	28	20	1906	0	0	4	0
5	DF	(Senegal) Mohamed Traore	24	20	1731	0	2	9	0
2	DF	(United States) Darnell King	26	20	1542	0	3	4	0
15	DF	(Nigeria) Henry Uzochukwu	25	10	1090	0	2	4	0
13	MF	(United States) Carlos Anguiano	5	3	240	0	0	1	0
28	FW	(United States) Jackson Conway	8	0	53	0	0	1	1
36	MF	(United States) Efetobo Aror	1	0	4	0	0	0	0
40	FW	(United States) Liam Mullins	1	0	1	0	0	0	0

=== Goalkeepers ===
#	Name	GP	GS	Min.	SV	GA	GAA	SO	A yellow rectangle, denoting the yellow penalty card shown to a player being cautioned	A red rectangle, denoting the red penalty card shown to a player being sent off
1	(Argentina) Rocco Ríos Novo	36	36	3330	115	42	1.135	7	4	0
22	(Germany) Patrick Rakovsky	2	2	180	9	5	2.500	0	0	0
