= 2024 Phoenix Rising FC season =

Phoenix Rising FC
2024 season
- Owners: List: Berke Bakay Alex Zheng Tim Riester Mark Detmer Brett M. Johnson Didier Drogba Brandon McCarthy Diplo Pete Wentz David Rappaport Dave Stearns Rick Hauser William Kraus Kevin Kusatsu Mark Leber Jim Scussel Vincere Capital (Pablo Prichard) Christopher Yeung
- Manager: Danny Stone (5–6–6); Diego Gómez (interim)(6–9–3)
- Stadium: Phoenix Rising Soccer Complex
- USL Championship: 8th, Western Conference
- USLC Playoffs: Conference Quarterfinals
- U.S. Open Cup: 5th Round
- Top goalscorer: Rémi Cabral (7 goals)
- Highest home attendance: 8,620 (October 19 vs Memphis 901 FC)
- Lowest home attendance: 4,190 (August 10 vs Tampa Bay Rowdies)
- Average home league attendance: 6,267
- Biggest win: 4–0 (September 21 vs San Antonio FC)
- Biggest defeat: 1–5 (June 28 vs Memphis 901 FC
Home colors	Away colors	Third colors

The 2024 Phoenix Rising FC season was the club's eleventh season in the USL Championship and their eighth as Phoenix Rising FC. They were the defending USL Championship winners this season.

== Competitions ==
=== Friendlies ===
January 27, 2024 Friendly	Phoenix Rising FC	0–1	Portland Timbers	Phoenix, Arizona
1:00 PM MST		Report	Antony 5'	Stadium: Phoenix Rising Soccer Stadium

February 10, 2024 Coachella Valley Invitational	Minnesota United FC	2–1	Phoenix Rising FC	Indio, California
12:00 PM PST	Dotson 24' (pen.); Weah 79'		Cabral 15'	Stadium: Empire Polo Club

February 14, 2024 Friendly	Charlotte FC	3–0	Phoenix Rising FC	Indio, California
1:00 PM MST	Scardina 3'; Berchimas 55'; Malanda 76'			Stadium: Empire Polo Club

February 24, 2024 Closed-door scrimmage	Phoenix Rising FC	0–2	Orange County SC	Phoenix, Arizona
2:00 PM MST			Jamison (?); Barjolo 89'	Stadium: Phoenix Rising Soccer Stadium

February 24, 2024 Friendly	Phoenix Rising FC	0–0	Las Vegas Lights FC	Phoenix, Arizona
7:00 PM MST		Report		Stadium: Phoenix Rising Soccer Stadium

March 1, 2024 Friendly	Phoenix Rising FC	0–2	LA Galaxy II	Phoenix, Arizona
7:00 PM MST		Report	Trialist 10'; Trialist 27'	Stadium: Phoenix Rising Soccer Stadium

=== USL Championship ===
Overall								Home						Away					
Pld	W	D	L	GF	GA	GD	Pts	W	D	L	GF	GA	GD	W	D	L	GF	GA	GD
34	11	9	14	33	39	−6	42	7	4	6	17	12	+5	4	5	8	16	27	−11

Source: Match reports

==== Results by round ====
Round	1	2	3	4	5	6	7	8	9	10	11	12	13	14	15	16	17	18	19	20	21	22	23	24	25	26	27	28	29	30	31	32	33	34
Ground	H	A	H	H	A	H	H	A	H	A	H	A	A	H	A	H	A	A	H	A	A	H	H	A	H	A	H	A	H	H	A	A	H	A
Result	L	L	W	L	D	W	L	W	D	D	W	L	D	W	D	D	L	L	W	D	L	D	D	W	W	L	W	L	L	L	W	W	L	L
Position	11	10	9	10	7	7	7	6	6	6	5	6	6	4	5	6	7	9	9	9	10	9	10	7	7	7	7	7	7	7	8	6	8	8

Updated to match(es) played on October 26, 2024. Source: Match reports
A = Away; H = Home; W = Win; D = Draw; L = Loss

==== Matches ====
All times from this point on Mountain Standard Time (UTC-07:00)

March 9, 2024 1	Phoenix Rising FC	0–1	Birmingham Legion FC	Phoenix, Arizona
7:30 PM MST	Formella (yellow card) 53'; Rito (yellow card) 71'	PHX Report; BHM Report	Martínez (yellow card) 45'; Scearce 67' (o.g.); Crognale (yellow card) 73'; Nwegbo (yellow card) 76'; Hernandez-Foster (yellow card) 76'	Stadium: Phoenix Rising Soccer Stadium; Attendance: 8,187; Referee: Elvis Osmanovic

March 16, 2024 2	Monterey Bay FC	1–0	Phoenix Rising FC	Seaside, California
7:00 PM MST	Baca 22'; Enríquez (yellow card) 83'; Fehr (yellow card) 85'; Siaha (yellow card) 90+4'	PHX Report; MB Report	Hernández (yellow card) 70'; Rito (yellow card) 77'; Cuello (yellow card) 90+4'	Stadium: Cardinale Stadium; Attendance: 4,867; Referee: Calin Radosav

March 23, 2024 3	Phoenix Rising FC	1–0	Oakland Roots SC	Phoenix, Arizona
7:00 PM MST	Armenakas 49'; Zambrano (yellow card) 51'; Traore (yellow card) 61'; Hernández (yellow card) 67'	PHX Report; OAK Report	Blanchette (yellow card) 38'; Margvelashvili (yellow card) 45'; Riley (yellow card) 54'; Diaz (yellow card) 73'; Cruz (yellow card) 90+8'	Stadium: Phoenix Rising Soccer Stadium; Attendance: 6,036; Referee: Matt Thompson

March 30, 2024 4	Phoenix Rising FC	0–1	New Mexico United	Phoenix, Arizona
7:30 PM MST	Formella (yellow card) 13'; Boye (yellow card) 57'; Doratiotto (yellow card) 64'; Hernández (yellow card) 65'; Novo (yellow card) 90+12'	PHX Report	Harris 16'; Akale (yellow card) 19'; Bailey (yellow card) 37'; Micaletto (yellow card) 45+5'	Stadium: Phoenix Rising Soccer Stadium; Attendance: 7,172; Referee: Alexis Da Silva

April 5, 2024 5	FC Tulsa	3–3	Phoenix Rising FC	Tulsa, Oklahoma
5:30 PM MST	Stojanovic 1'; Dalou (yellow card) 8'; Laszo 50'; Souahy 57'; Yosef (yellow card) 71'; Bourgeois (yellow card) 71'	PHX Report; TUL Report	Cabral 39' (pen.), 42'; Cuello (red card) 61'; Formella 73' (pen.)	Stadium: Oneok Field; Attendance: 5,135; Referee: Matthew Corrigan

April 13, 2024 6	Phoenix Rising FC	1–0	Colorado Springs Switchbacks	Phoenix, Arizona
7:30 PM MST	Doratiotto (yellow card) 5'; Traore (yellow card) 21'; Torres (yellow card) 55'; Stenberg 71'; Hernández (yellow card) 90+2'	PHX Report; COS Report	Andersson (yellow card) 88'	Stadium: Phoenix Rising Soccer Stadium; Attendance: 6,277; Referee: Nabil Bensalah

April 20, 2024 7	Phoenix Rising FC	1–3	Pittsburgh Riverhounds SC	Phoenix, Arizona
7:30 PM MST	Stenberg (yellow card) 24'; Cabral 28'; Gallardo (yellow card) 42'; Boye (yellow card) 47'	PHX Report; PGH Report	Osumanu (yellow card) 15'; Sterling 26'; Kizza 62'; Diene 90'	Stadium: Phoenix Rising Soccer Stadium; Attendance: 6,759; Referee: Brad Jensen

April 26, 2024 8	Rhode Island FC	1–3	Phoenix Rising FC	Smithfield, Rhode Island
4:30 PM MST	Yao (yellow card) 35'; Holstad (yellow card) 43' (goal) 89'; Fuson (yellow card) 68'	PHX Report; RI Report	Cabral 7', 34'; Traore (yellow card) 12'; Fuenmayor (yellow card) 23'; Stenberg (yellow card) 80'; Formella (yellow card) 88'; Varela 90'	Stadium: Beirne Stadium; Attendance: 4,000; Referee: Sergii Demianchuk

May 4, 2024 9	Phoenix Rising FC	1–1	Sacramento Republic FC	Phoenix, Arizona
7:30 PM MST	Cabral (yellow card) 29' (goal) 66'; Formella (yellow card) 51'; Cuello (yellow card) 53'	PHX Report; SAC Report	López 33'; Felipe (yellow card) 62'	Stadium: Phoenix Rising Soccer Stadium; Attendance: 5,596; Referee: Adam Kilpatrick

May 11, 2024 10	Detroit City FC	1–1	Phoenix Rising FC	Hamtramck, Michigan
6:30 PM MST	Morris 9'; Rodriguez (yellow card) 38'	PHX Report; DET Report	Doratiotto 49'; Torres (yellow card) 65'; Hernández (yellow card) 81'	Stadium: Keyworth Stadium; Attendance: 6,538; Referee: Trevor Wiseman

May 18, 2024 11	Phoenix Rising FC	2–0	Miami FC	Phoenix, Arizona
7:30 PM MST	Varela 36'; Rito 43' (yellow card) 44'; Armenakas (yellow card) 78'	PHX Report; MIA Report	Mitrano (yellow card) 81'; Depaula (yellow card) 88'	Stadium: Phoenix Rising Soccer Stadium; Attendance: 8,081; Referee: Matthew Corrigan

May 25, 2024 12	Indy Eleven	2–1	Phoenix Rising FC	Indianapolis, Indiana
4:00 PM MST	Blake 26' (pen.), 64' (yellow card) 57'; Lindley (yellow card) 41'; Boudadi (yellow card) 45+2'; O'Brien (yellow card) 90'	PHX Report; IND Report	Hernández 19' (yellow card) 27'; Scearce (yellow card) 32'; Wyke (yellow card) 50'; Novo (yellow card) 62'	Stadium: Carroll Stadium; Attendance: 10,066; Referee: Calin Radosav

June 1, 2024 13	Las Vegas Lights FC	0–0	Phoenix Rising FC	Las Vegas, Nevada
7:30 PM MST	Adams (yellow card) 45+1'	PHX Report; LVL Result	Rito (yellow card) 21'; Fuenmayor (yellow card) 44'	Stadium: Cashman Field; Attendance: 1,720; Referee: Muhammad Hassan

June 8, 2024 14	Phoenix Rising FC	2–1	Orange County SC	Phoenix, Arizona
8:00 PM MST	Formella 6', 87'; Hernández (yellow card) 22'; Fuenmayor (yellow card) 51'; Rito (yellow card) 83' (red card) 84'	PHX Report; OCO Report	Miles (yellow card) 45+1'; Zubak 57'; Lambe (yellow card) 59'; Chattha (yellow card) 79'	Stadium: Phoenix Rising Soccer Stadium; Attendance: 5,032; Referee: Ricardo Montero

June 15, 2024 15	El Paso Locomotive FC	1–1	Phoenix Rising FC	El Paso, Texas
6:00 PM MST	Calvillo 13'; Akinyode (yellow card) 36'; Pasquel (yellow card) 73'; Zacarías (yellow card) 86'; Rose (yellow card) 90+2'	PHX Report; ELP Report	Scearce (yellow card) 59'; Armenakas 82'	Stadium: Southwest University Park; Attendance: 5,802; Referee: Elijio Arreguin

June 22, 2024 16	Phoenix Rising FC	0–0	Charleston Battery	Phoenix, Arizona
7:30 PM MST	Fuenmayor (yellow card) 3'; Torres (yellow card) 27'; Hernández (yellow card) 38'; Boye (yellow card) 67'	PHX Report; CHS Report	Smith (yellow card) 63'	Stadium: Phoenix Rising Soccer Stadium; Attendance: 7,244; Referee: Abdou Ndiaye

June 28, 2024 17	Memphis 901 FC	5–1	Phoenix Rising FC	Memphis, Tennessee
5:30 PM MST	Duncan 11'; Marlon 27'; Vom Steeg 55'; Hyndman 58'; Pickering 81'	PHX Report; MEM Report	Rito (yellow card) 32'; Formella 65'; Gallardo (yellow card) 73'	Stadium: AutoZone Park; Attendance: 2,775; Referee: Jeremy Scheer

July 6, 2024 18	San Antonio FC	2–1	Phoenix Rising FC	San Antonio, Texas
6:00 PM MST	Agudelo 39', 81' (pen.)	PHX Report; SAN Report	Boye (yellow card) 38'; Varela 58'; Cuello (yellow card) 90+5'	Stadium: Toyota Field; Attendance: 6,011; Referee: Greg Dopka

July 19, 2024 19	Phoenix Rising FC	2–0	El Paso Locomotive FC	Phoenix, Arizona
8:00 PM MST	Fuenmayor (yellow card) 28'; Scearce (yellow card) 34' (goal) 43'; Boye 87'	PHX Report; ELP Report	Ruiz (yellow card) 80'; Dollenmayer (yellow card) 85'	Stadium: Phoenix Rising Soccer Stadium; Attendance: 6,544; Referee: Elton Garcia

July 26, 2024 20	Hartford Athletic	0–0	Phoenix Rising FC	Hartford, Connecticut
4:30 PM MST	Dieng (yellow card) 74'	PHX Report; HFD Report	Wyke (yellow card) 9'; Torres (yellow card) 45+2'; John (yellow card) 68'	Stadium: Trinity Health Stadium; Referee: Gerald Flores

August 3, 2024 21	Colorado Springs Switchbacks	2–0	Phoenix Rising FC	Colorado Springs, Colorado
1:00 PM MST	Damus 34'; Foster (yellow card) 50'; Rocha (yellow card) 90+4'; Magee 90+9' (yellow card) 90+9'	PHX Report; COS Report	Zambrano (yellow card) 12'; Torres (yellow card) 65'; Doratiotto (yellow card) 90+4'	Stadium: Weidner Field; Attendance: 8,023; Referee: Elijio Arreguin

August 10, 2024 22	Phoenix Rising FC	0–0	Tampa Bay Rowdies	Phoenix, Arizona
8:00 PM MST	Dennis (yellow card) 61'; John (yellow card) 90'	PHX Report; TBR Report	Joshua (yellow card) 3'; Crisostomo (yellow card) 55'	Stadium: Phoenix Rising Soccer Stadium; Attendance: 4,190; Referee: Abdou Ndiaye

August 24, 2024 23	Phoenix Rising FC	0–0	North Carolina FC	Phoenix, Arizona
8:00 PM MST	Scearce (yellow card) 51'; Doratiotto (yellow card) 67'	PHX Report; NCA Report	Armstrong (yellow card) 10'; Mentzingen (yellow card) 29'; Malou (yellow card) 41'; Martin (yellow card) 43'	Stadium: Phoenix Rising Soccer Stadium; Attendance: 5,000; Referee: Muhammad Hassan

August 31, 2024 24	Loudoun United FC	0–1	Phoenix Rising FC	Leesburg, Virginia
4:30 PM MST	Leerman (yellow card) 40'; Ryan (yellow card) 74'; Wane (yellow card) 90+4'	PHX Report	Cuello (yellow card) 70'; Fuenmayor (yellow card) 80'; Margaritha 84'	Stadium: Segra Field; Attendance: 1,890; Referee: Jeremy Scheer

September 6, 2024 25	Phoenix Rising FC	1–0	FC Tulsa	Phoenix, Arizona
8:00 PM MST	Ángel 45+4' (pen.) (yellow card) 70'; Fuenmayor (yellow card) 87'	PHX Report; TUL Report	Bell (yellow card) 65'	Stadium: Phoenix Rising Soccer Stadium; Attendance: 4,937; Referee: Ricardo Fierro

September 14, 2024 26	Sacramento Republic FC	2–0	Phoenix Rising FC	Sacramento, California
7:00 PM MST	Herrera 7' (yellow card) 26'; Felipe (yellow card) 27'; Phillips 67'; Sanchez (yellow card) 73'; Vitiello (yellow card) 78'; Desmond (yellow card) 90+5'	PHX Report	Wyke (yellow card) 25'; Fuenmayor (yellow card) 48'; Hernández (yellow card) 77'; Formella (yellow card) 90+5'; Traore (yellow card) 90+6'	Stadium: Heart Health Park; Attendance: 11,569; Referee: Matthew Thompson

September 21, 2024 27	Phoenix Rising FC	4–0	San Antonio FC	Phoenix, Arizona
7:30 PM MST	Boye 27'; Formella 40'; Dennis 40'; Novo (yellow card) 79'; John 84'; Wyke (yellow card) 89'	PHX Report; SAN Report	Hernandez (yellow card) 68'; Taintor (yellow card) 79'; Blanco (yellow card) 90+3'	Stadium: Phoenix Rising Soccer Stadium; Attendance: 4,844; Referee: Gerald Flores

September 25, 2024 28	Orange County SC	2–0	Phoenix Rising FC	Irvine, California
7:00 PM MST	Zubak 7', 39'; Hegardt (yellow card) 36'; Partida (yellow card) 65'	PHX Report	Hernández (yellow card) 2'; Margaritha (yellow card) 36'; Wyke (yellow card) 45+5'; Torres (yellow card) 45+5'; Dennis (yellow card) 66'; Boye (yellow card) 88'	Stadium: Championship Soccer Stadium; Attendance: 3,018; Referee: John Griggs

September 28, 2024 29	Phoenix Rising FC	1–2	Las Vegas Lights FC	Phoenix, Arizona
7:30 PM MST	Boye (yellow card) 17'; Cabral 60'; Traore (yellow card) 70'; Fuenmayor (yellow card) 86'	PHX Report; LVL Report	Jabang (yellow card) 74'; Ngando 90+6'; Doody 90+9'	Stadium: Phoenix Rising Soccer Stadium; Attendance: 6,073; Referee: Calin Radosav

October 4, 2024 30	Phoenix Rising FC	1–2	Monterey Bay FC	Phoenix, Arizona
7:30 PM MST	Zambrano (yellow card) 25'; Formella 84'	PHX Report; MB Report	Fehr 15'; Novo 44' (o.g.); Guzmán (yellow card) 61'	Stadium: Phoenix Rising Soccer Stadium; Attendance: 5,757; Referee: Brandon Stevis

October 9, 2024 31	New Mexico United	1–2	Phoenix Rising FC	Albuquerque, New Mexico
6:00 PM MST	Maples 28' (pen.) (yellow card) 61'; Landry (yellow card) 51'		Zambrano (yellow card) 14'; Dennis (yellow card) 19' (goal) 59'; Ángel 45+3' (pen.) (yellow card) 67'; Azócar (yellow card) 89' (red card) 90+5'; Cuello (yellow card) 90'	Stadium: Isotopes Park; Attendance: 8,319; Referee: Thomas Snyder

October 12, 2024 32	Oakland Roots SC	0–1	Phoenix Rising FC	Hayward, California
7:00 PM MST	Diaz (yellow card) 38'; Rodriguez (yellow card) 68'; Margvelashvili (yellow card) 70'	PHX Report; OAK Report	Ángel 55' (yellow card) 73'; Boye (yellow card) 68'; Dennis (yellow card) 90+4'	Stadium: Pioneer Stadium; Attendance: 5,252; Referee: Matthew Corrigan

October 19, 2024 33	Phoenix Rising FC	0–1	Memphis 901 FC	Phoenix, Arizona
7:30 PM MST	Boye (yellow card) 10'; Dennis (yellow card) 23'; Johnson (yellow card) 40'; Formella (yellow card) 55'; Cuello (yellow card) 57'	PHX Report; MEM Report	Duncan (yellow card) 35'; Borczak 44'; Lapa (yellow card) 75'	Stadium: Phoenix Rising Soccer Stadium; Attendance: 8,620; Referee: Alyssa Nichols

October 26, 2024 34	Louisville City FC	4–1	Phoenix Rising FC	Louisville, Kentucky
4:30 PM MST	Harris 24', 28'; Serrano 66'; Goodrum 90+2'	PHX Report; LOU Report	Margaritha 8'; Fuenmayor (yellow card) 81'	Stadium: Lynn Family Stadium; Attendance: 10,187; Referee: Jeremy Scheer

==== Group table ====
Pos	Team	Pld	W	L	T	GF	GA	GD	Pts	Qualification
6	Orange County SC	34	13	14	7	38	45	−7	46	Playoffs
7	Oakland Roots SC	34	13	16	5	37	57	−20	44	Playoffs
8	Phoenix Rising FC	34	11	14	9	33	39	−6	42	Playoffs
9	San Antonio FC	34	10	15	9	36	49	−13	39	
10	FC Tulsa	34	9	14	11	33	48	−15	38	

Source: USL Championship Standings
Rules for classification: 1) head-to-head points; 2) head-to-head goal differential; 3) points-per game within conference; 4) total wins; 5) total goal differential; 6) total goals scored; 7) points earned against top four Conference finishers; 8) disciplinary points; 9) coin toss or drawing of lots

=== U.S. Open Cup ===
Having won the USL Championship in 2023, Phoenix Rising enters the tournament proper in the Fourth Round.

May 8, 2024 Fourth Round	North Carolina FC	1–2 (a.e.t.)	Phoenix Rising FC	Cary, North Carolina
4:00 PM MST	Craig (yellow card) 9' (red card) 40'; Malou (yellow card) 54' (goal) 80'; Somersall (yellow card) 85'; Anderson (yellow card) 86'; Armstrong (yellow card) 90+2' (red card) 95'; Placias (yellow card) 90+6'	PHX Report; NCA Report	Wyke (yellow card) 7' (red card) 24'; Azócar 9' (yellow card) 90+8'; Doratiotto (yellow card) 110' (goal) 111'; Gallardo (yellow card) 117'	Stadium: WakeMed Soccer Park; Attendance: 822

May 22, 2024 Round of 16	Seattle Sounders FC	2–1	Phoenix Rising FC	Tukwila, Washington
7:30 PM MST	Roldan 68' (pen.); Kossa-Rienzi 88'	PHX Report; SEA Report	Cabral 45+5' (pen.); Stenberg (yellow card) 66'; Azócar (yellow card) 71'	Stadium: Starfire Sports; Attendance: 3,314; Referee: Brandon Stevis

=== USL Championship Playoffs ===
==== Conference Playoffs ====
November 3, 2024 Quarterfinals	New Mexico United	2–1	Phoenix Rising FC	Albuquerque, New Mexico
6:00 pm PST	Seymore 58'; Herbert (yellow card) 76'; Akale 85'	PHX Report	Varela 49'; Fuenmayor (yellow card) 61'; Wyke (yellow card) 63'	Stadium: Rio Grande Credit Union Field at Isotopes Park; Attendance: 11,447; Referee: Lorenzo Hernandez

== Roster ==
No.	Name	Nationality	Position(s)	Date of birth (age)	Signed in	Previous club
Goalkeepers
1	Rocco Ríos Novo	(Argentina)	GK	June 4, 2002 (age 24)	2024	(Argentina) CA Lanús (loan)
22	Patrick Rakovsky	(Germany)	GK	June 2, 1993 (age 33)	2023	(United States) Orange County SC
99	Skylar Odle	(United States)	GK	January 16, 2005 (age 21)	2024	(United States) Phoenix Rising Academy
Defenders
3	John Stenberg	(Sweden)	DF	October 12, 1992 (age 33)	2022	(Sweden) Östers IF
4	Pape Mar Boye	(Senegal)	DF	December 30, 2003 (age 22)	2024	(United States) Clemson University
5	Mohamed Traore	(Senegal)	DF	August 15, 2002 (age 23)	2024	(United States) Los Angeles FC
15	Ryan Flood	(United States)	DF	October 17, 1998 (age 27)	2024	(Republic of Ireland) Finn Harps
16	Gabriel Torres	(Brazil)	DF	August 1, 1996 (age 29)	2022	(United States) FC Tulsa
27	Laurence Wyke	(England)	DF	September 20, 1996 (age 29)	2024	(United States) Nashville SC
30	Alejandro Fuenmayor	(Venezuela)	DF	August 29, 1996 (age 29)	2022	(United States) Oakland Roots SC
35	Christopher Grote	(United States)	DF	June 8, 2006 (age 20)	2024	(United States) Phoenix Rising Academy
72	Edgardo Rito	(Venezuela)	DF	February 17, 1996 (age 30)	2023	(United States) Hartford Athletic
77	Juan Carlos Azócar	(Venezuela)	DF	October 1, 1995 (age 30)	2023	(United States) San Antonio FC
Midfielders
6	Giulio Doratiotto	(Italy)	MF	May 18, 2004 (age 22)	2024	(Italy) Juventus Next Gen
7	Damien Barker John	(United States)	MF	December 7, 2004 (age 21)	2024	(United States) Real Monarchs (loan)
8	José Hernández	(Mexico)	MF	April 12, 1996 (age 30)	2022	(United States) Oakland Roots SC
10	Federico Varela	(Argentina)	MF	May 7, 1996 (age 30)	2022	(Bulgaria) CSKA Sofia
12	Charlie Dennis	(England)	MF	September 28, 1995 (age 30)	2024	(United States) Tampa Bay Rowdies
14	Emil Cuello	(Argentina)	MF	January 2, 1997 (age 29)	2023	(United States) Sacramento Republic FC
17	JP Scearce	(United States)	MF	December 19, 1997 (age 28)	2023	(United States) Union Omaha
21	Panos Armenakas	(Australia)	MF	August 5, 1998 (age 27)	2023	(United States) Loudoun United FC
26	Renzo Zambrano	(Venezuela)	MF	August 26, 1994 (age 31)	2022	(Armenia) FC Pyunik
31	Jamison Ping	(United States)	MF	March 22, 2008 (age 18)	2024	(United States) Phoenix Rising Academy
47	Braxton Montgomery	(United States)	MF	March 23, 2007 (age 19)	2024	(United States) Phoenix Rising Academy
54	Logan Veloria	(United States)	MF	May 8, 2006 (age 20)	2024	(United States) Phoenix Rising Academy
68	David Landis	(United States)	MF	March 3, 2006 (age 20)	2023	(United States) SC Del Sol Academy
85	Cameron Kobey	(United States)	MF	June 17, 2006 (age 20)	2024	(United States) Phoenix Rising Academy
Forwards
7	Erickson Gallardo	(Venezuela)	FW	July 26, 1996 (age 29)	2022	(Venezuela) Zamora FC
9	Tomás Ángel	(Colombia)	FW	February 20, 2003 (age 23)	2024	(United States) Los Angeles FC (loan)
29	Dariusz Formella	(Poland)	FW	October 21, 1995 (age 30)	2023	(United States) Oakland Roots SC
33	Zachary Smuck	(United States)	FW	February 18, 2006 (age 20)	2024	(United States) Barca Residency Academy
38	Darius Johnson	(Grenada)	FW	March 15, 2000 (age 26)	2024	(Netherlands) FC Volendam
71	Jearl Margaritha	(Curaçao)	FW	April 10, 2000 (age 26)	2024	(Azerbaijan) Sabah FC
91	Rémi Cabral	(France)	FW	July 10, 1999 (age 26)	2024	(United States) Colorado Rapids (loan)

USL Academy contract.

== Player transactions ==
=== Loan in ===
Start date	End date	Position	No.	Player	From club	Ref.
January 19, 2024	End of Season	Goalkeeper	1	(Argentina) Rocco Ríos Novo	(Argentina) CA Lanús	
January 24, 2024	Until Recalled	Forward	91	(France) Rémi Cabral	(United States) Colorado Rapids	
July 18, 2024	Until Recalled	Midfielder	7	(United States) Damien Barker John	(United States) Real Monarchs	
August 2, 2024	End of Season	Forward	9	(Colombia) Tomás Ángel	(United States) Los Angeles FC	

=== Loan out ===
Start date	End date	Position	No.	Player	To club	Ref.
May 31, 2024	Until Recalled	Defender	15	(United States) Ryan Flood	(United States) Orange County SC	

=== Transfer in ===
Date	Position	No.	Player	From club	Ref.
July 17, 2024	Midfielder	12	(England) Charlie Dennis	(United States) Tampa Bay Rowdies	
August 16, 2024	Forward	71	(Curaçao) Jearl Margaritha	(Azerbaijan) Sabah FC	
August 22, 2024	Forward	38	(Grenada) Darius Johnson	(Netherlands) FC Volendam	

=== Transfer out ===
Date	Position	No.	Player	To club	Ref.
December 18, 2023	Forward	9	(Venezuela) Manuel Arteaga	(United States) Tampa Bay Rowdies	
January 24, 2024	Midfielder	67	(Panama) Carlos Harvey	(United States) Minnesota United FC	
March 29, 2024	Defender	12	(United States) Eddie Munjoma	(United States) Tampa Bay Rowdies	
July 8, 2024	Forward	7	(Venezuela) Erickson Gallardo	(Venezuela) Carabobo FC	
August 1, 2024	Midfielder	21	(Australia) Panos Armenakas	(United States) Memphis 901 FC	

== Statistics ==
As of August 10, 2024

#	Pos.	Name	GP	GS	Min.	Goals	Assists	A yellow rectangle, denoting the yellow penalty card shown to a player being cautioned	A red rectangle, denoting the red penalty card shown to a player being sent off
91	FW	(France) Rémi Cabral	15	10	974	6	1	1	0
29	FW	(Poland) Dariusz Formella	19	11	1066	4	2	5	0
10	MF	(Argentina) Fede Varela	21	15	1328	3	2	0	0
21	FW	(Australia) Panos Armenakas	16	12	1036	2	1	1	0
4	DF	(Senegal) Pape Mar Boye	19	17	1535	1	1	4	0
72	DF	(Venezuela) Edgardo Rito	20	12	1112	1	0	6	1
8	MF	(Mexico) José Hernández	18	12	1060	1	0	8	0
3	DF	(Sweden) John Stenberg	9	9	786	1	0	3	0
17	MF	(United States) JP Scearce	14	7	708	1	0	3	0
6	MF	(Italy) Giulio Doratiotto	16	6	540	1	0	3	0
26	MF	(Venezuela) Renzo Zambrano	22	21	1887	0	3	1	0
27	DF	(England) Laurence Wyke	20	18	1576	0	0	2	0
77	DF	(Venezuela) Juan Carlos Azócar	21	12	1062	0	2	0	0
16	MF	(Brazil) Gabriel Torres	22	12	1049	0	3	5	0
30	DF	(Venezuela) Alejandro Fuenmayor	15	12	997	0	0	7	0
5	DF	(Senegal) Mohamed Traore	15	11	980	0	0	3	0
7	FW	(Venezuela) Erickson Gallardo	15	7	719	0	0	2	0
14	MF	(Argentina) Emil Cuello	17	8	671	0	2	3	1
12	MF	(England) Charlie Dennis	4	3	280	0	0	1	0
9	FW	(Colombia) Tomás Ángel	2	2	180	0	0	0	0
7	MF	(United States) Damien Barker John	4	1	114	0	0	2	0
15	MF	(United States) Ryan Flood	3	2	102	0	0	0	0
12	DF	(United States) Eddie Munjoma	2	1	85	0	0	1	0

=== Goalkeepers ===
#	Name	GP	GS	Min.	SV	GA	GAA	SO	A yellow rectangle, denoting the yellow penalty card shown to a player being cautioned	A red rectangle, denoting the red penalty card shown to a player being sent off
1	(Argentina) Rocco Ríos Novo	22	22	1980	68	25	1.136	8	3	0
22	(Germany) Patrick Rakovsky	0	0	0	0	0	0.000	0	0	0
