= Rocco Ríos Novo =

Argentine footballer (born 2002)

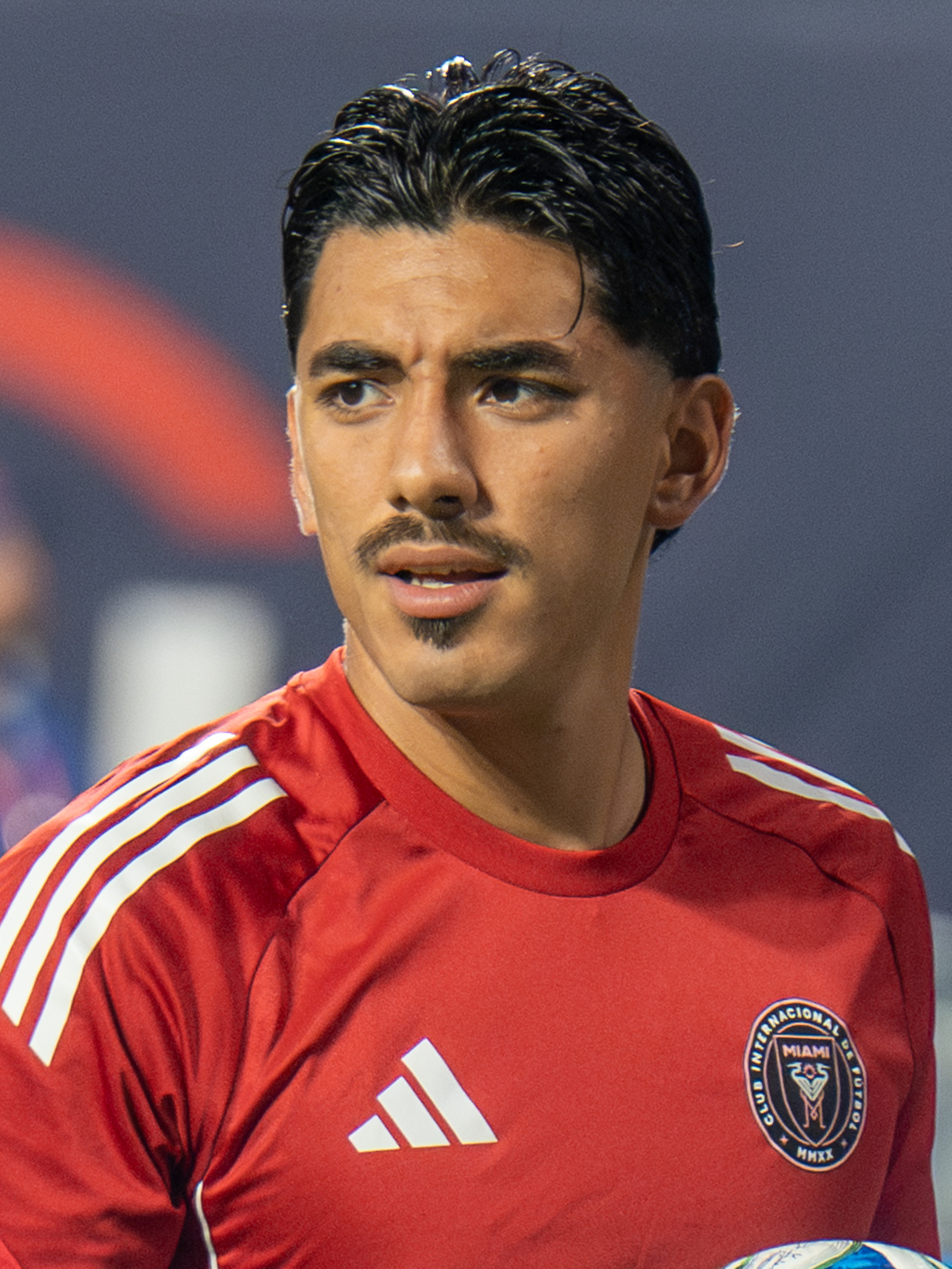
- Ríos Novo with Inter Miami in 2025

Personal information
- Full name: Rocco Ríos Novo
- Date of birth: June 4, 2002 (age 24)
- Place of birth: Los Angeles, California, US
- Height: 5 ft 10 in (1.78 m)
- Position: Goalkeeper

Team information
- Current team: Inter Miami
- Number: 34

Youth career
- Lanús

Senior career*
Years	Team	Apps	(Gls)
2021–2025	Lanús	0	(0)
2021–2022	→ Atlanta United (loan)	16	(0)
2021–2022	→ Atlanta United 2 (loan)	22	(0)
2023–2024	→ Phoenix Rising (loan)	70	(0)
2025	→ Inter Miami (loan)	16	(0)
2025	→ Inter Miami II (loan)	1	(0)
2026–	Inter Miami	6	(0)

International career^{‡}
2017	Argentina U15	6	(0)
2018	Argentina U16	3	(0)
2019	Argentina U17	15	(0)
2023	Argentina U23	1	(0)
- * Club domestic league appearances and goals as of 28 September 2026 ‡ National team caps and goals as of 8 December 2025

Rocco Ríos Novo (born June 4, 2002) is a professional footballer who plays as a goalkeeper for Major League Soccer club Inter Miami. Born in the United States, he represents Argentina at international level.

== Club career ==
Born in Los Angeles, California, Ríos Novo began his career with Argentine club Lanús. On 2 March 2021, Ríos was loaned to Atlanta United 2, the reserve side of Major League Soccer club Atlanta United. On 5 April 2021, he signed a short-term contract with Atlanta United's first team before their CONCACAF Champions League match against Alajuelense.

Ríos Novo then made his professional debut for Atlanta United in the match against Alajuelense, coming on as a late first-half substitute for Brad Guzan, who was sent off with a red card.

On 21 April 2022, Ríos Novo was seen leaving Argentina via his Instagram story, hugging family members goodbye on a flight to Atlanta, as Atlanta United completed a deal to loan him back to the club after Brad Guzan tore his Achilles earlier that week.

After his time with Atlanta United 2, Ríos Novo signed with USL Championship club Phoenix Rising FC. He featured prominently during the team's playoff campaign, which concluded with the 2023 USL Championship Final against the Charleston Battery. The match ended 1–1 after extra time, and Phoenix won 3–2 in a penalty shootout. Ríos Novo saved the final two penalties, securing the club's first championship title, and winning him recognition as the game's most valuable player.

On 16 January 2025, Ríos Novo signed for Inter Miami on loan for the 2025 MLS season. On 9 March, he made his debut with Inter Miami when he came on to replace Benjamin Cremaschi as a late first-half substitute because the keeper Oscar Ustari received a red card Miami's game against Charlotte FC as the team won 1–0.

== International career ==
Eligible for the United States, Mexico and Argentina. Ríos Novo represented Argentina at several international youth levels ranging from the under-15 side to the under-16 side, including the under-17 side.

== Personal life ==
Ríos Novo was born to a father from Mexico and mother from Argentina.

== Career statistics ==
=== Club ===
As of match played 4 November 2024

Appearances and goals by club, season and competition
Club	Season	League			National cup		Continental		Other		Total	
Club	Season	Division	Apps	Goals	Apps	Goals	Apps	Goals	Apps	Goals	Apps	Goals
Atlanta United (loan)	2021	Major League Soccer	—		—		2 (Note: Appearances in CONCACAF Champions League)	0	—		2	0
Atlanta United (loan)	2022	Major League Soccer	16	0	0	0	—		—		16	0
Atlanta United (loan)	Total		16	0	0	0	2	0	—		18	0
Atlanta United 2 (loan)	2021	USL Championship	20	0	—		—		—		20	0
Atlanta United 2 (loan)	2022	USL Championship	2	0	—		—		—		2	0
Atlanta United 2 (loan)	Total		22	0	—		—		—		22	0
Phoenix Rising (loan)	2023	USL Championship	36	0	0	0	—		—		36	0
Phoenix Rising (loan)	2024	USL Championship	34	0	0	0	—		—		34	0
Phoenix Rising (loan)	Total		70	0	0	0	—		—		70	0
Inter Miami (loan)	2025	MLS	16	0	0	0	3	0	—		19	0
Inter Miami	2026	MLS	0	0	0	0	0	0			0	0
Total			108	0	0	0	5	0			129	0

== Honours ==
Phoenix Rising

- USL Championship: 2023

Inter Miami

- MLS Cup: 2025
- Campeones Cup: 2026

Argentina U15

- South American U-15 Championship: 2017

Argentina U17

- South American U-17 Championship: 2019

Individual

- USL Championship Young Player of the Year: 2023 (Finalist)
- USL Championship Final MVP: 2023
