= Patrick Rakovsky =

German footballer (born 1993)

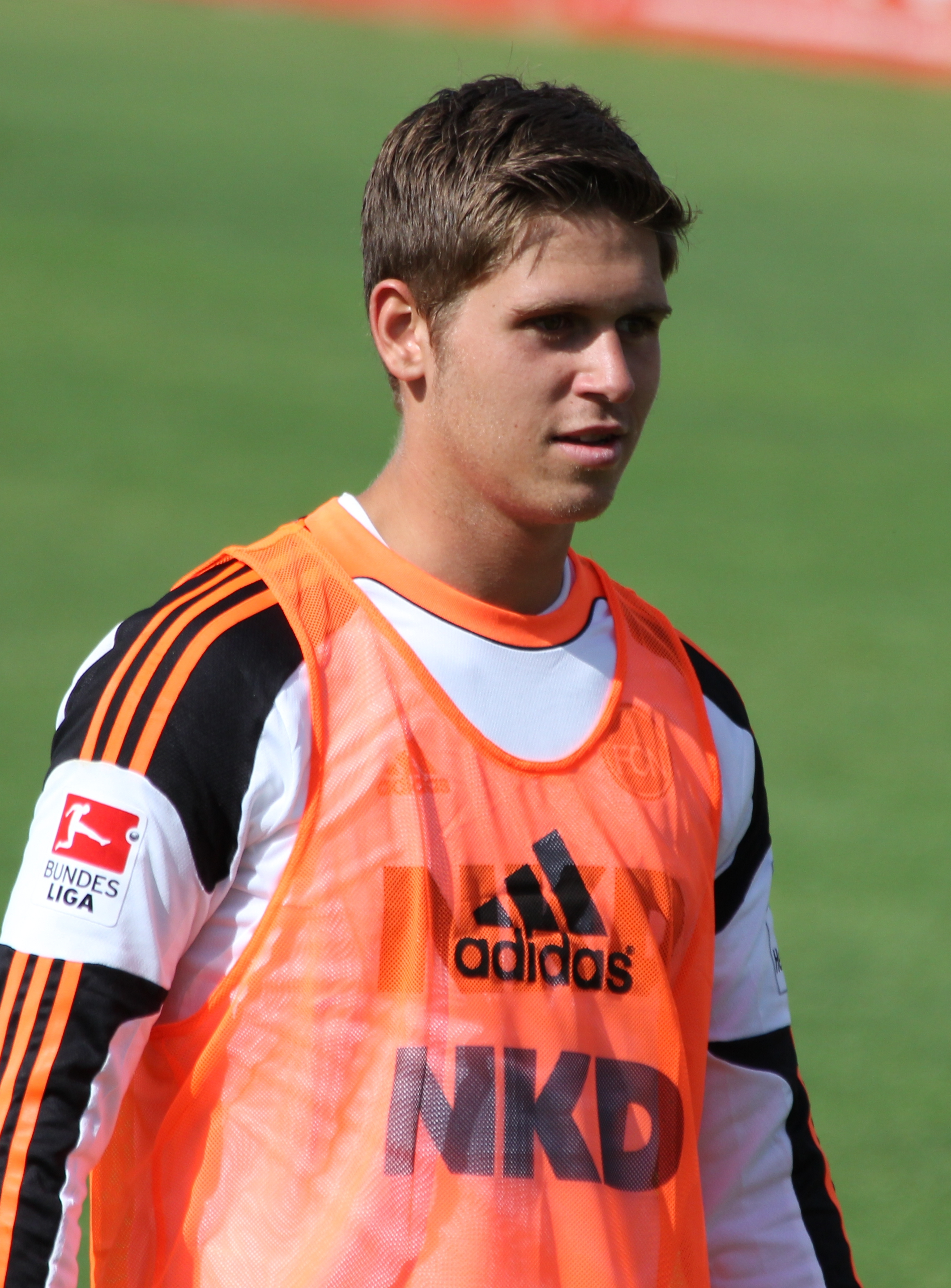
- Rakovsky in 2013

Personal information
- Date of birth: 2 June 1993 (age 33)
- Place of birth: Olpe, Germany
- Height: 1.87 m (6 ft 2 in)
- Position: Goalkeeper

Team information
- Current team: Phoenix Rising
- Number: 1

Youth career
- SC Bleche-Germinghausen
- FC Schreibershof
- 1999–2000: Dukla Prague
- 2000–2003: Sparta Prague
- 2003–2004: Slavia Prague
- 2004–2007: Sparta Prague
- 2007–2011: Schalke 04

Senior career*
Years	Team	Apps	(Gls)
2011–2017	1. FC Nürnberg	39	(0)
2011–2017	1. FC Nürnberg II	55	(0)
2017–2018	Lierse	25	(0)
2019–2020	Lahti	44	(0)
2021–2022	Orange County SC	51	(0)
2023–	Phoenix Rising	52	(0)

International career
2008	Germany U15	1	(0)
2008–2009	Germany U16	2	(0)
2009–2010	Germany U17	3	(0)
2010	Germany U18	2	(0)
2011–2012	Germany U19	5	(0)
2012–2013	Germany U20	5	(0)
- * Club domestic league appearances and goals as of 18:44, 10 November 2026 (UTC)

Patrick Rakovsky (born 2 June 1993) is a German professional footballer who plays as a goalkeeper for Phoenix Rising FC in the USL Championship.

Rakovsky joined Orange County SC of the USL Championship in December 2020 from Finnish club Lahti. In 2021, Rakovsky and Orange County won the 2021 USL Championship Final.

On 17 January 2023, Rakovsky signed with Phoenix Rising FC.

== Career statistics ==
As of 15 February 2025

Appearances and goals by club, season and competition
Club	Season	League			Cup (Note: Includes DFB-Pokal, Suomen Cup and U.S. Open Cup)		Total	
Club	Season	Division	Apps	Goals	Apps	Goals	Apps	Goals
1. FC Nürnberg	2011–12	Bundesliga	2	0	0	0	2	0
1. FC Nürnberg	2012–13	Bundesliga	4	0	0	0	4	0
1. FC Nürnberg	2013–14	Bundesliga	2	0	0	0	2	0
1. FC Nürnberg	2014–15	2. Bundesliga	21	0	0	0	21	0
1. FC Nürnberg	2015–16	2. Bundesliga	10	0	0	0	10	0
1. FC Nürnberg	2016–17	2. Bundesliga	0	0	0	0	0	0
1. FC Nürnberg	Total		39	0	0	0	39	0
1. FC Nürnberg II	2011–12	Regionalliga Süd	14	0	—		14	0
1. FC Nürnberg II	2012–13	Regionalliga Bayern	9	0	—		9	0
1. FC Nürnberg II	2013–14	Regionalliga Bayern	12	0	—		12	0
1. FC Nürnberg II	2014–15	Regionalliga Bayern	0	0	—		0	0
1. FC Nürnberg II	2015–16	Regionalliga Bayern	5	0	—		5	0
1. FC Nürnberg II	2016–17	Regionalliga Bayern	15	0	—		15	0
1. FC Nürnberg II	Total		55	0	—		55	0
Lierse	2017–18	Challenger Pro League	25	0	0	0	25	0
Lahti	2019	Veikkausliiga	26	0	7	0	33	0
Lahti	2020	Veikkausliiga	18	0	7	0	25	0
Lahti	Total		44	0	14	0	58	0
Orange County SC	2021	USL Championship	28	0	0	0	28	0
Orange County SC	2022	USL Championship	27	0	2	0	29	0
Orange County SC	Total		55	0	2	0	57	0
Phoenix Rising	2023	USL Championship	2	0	2	0	4	0
Phoenix Rising	2024	USL Championship	1	0	2	0	3	0
Phoenix Rising	Total		3	0	4	0	7	0
Career total			221	0	20	0	241	0

== Honours ==
Individual

- Fritz Walter Medal U19 Bronze: 2012
