= Danny Trejo (soccer) =

Mexican footballer (born 1998)

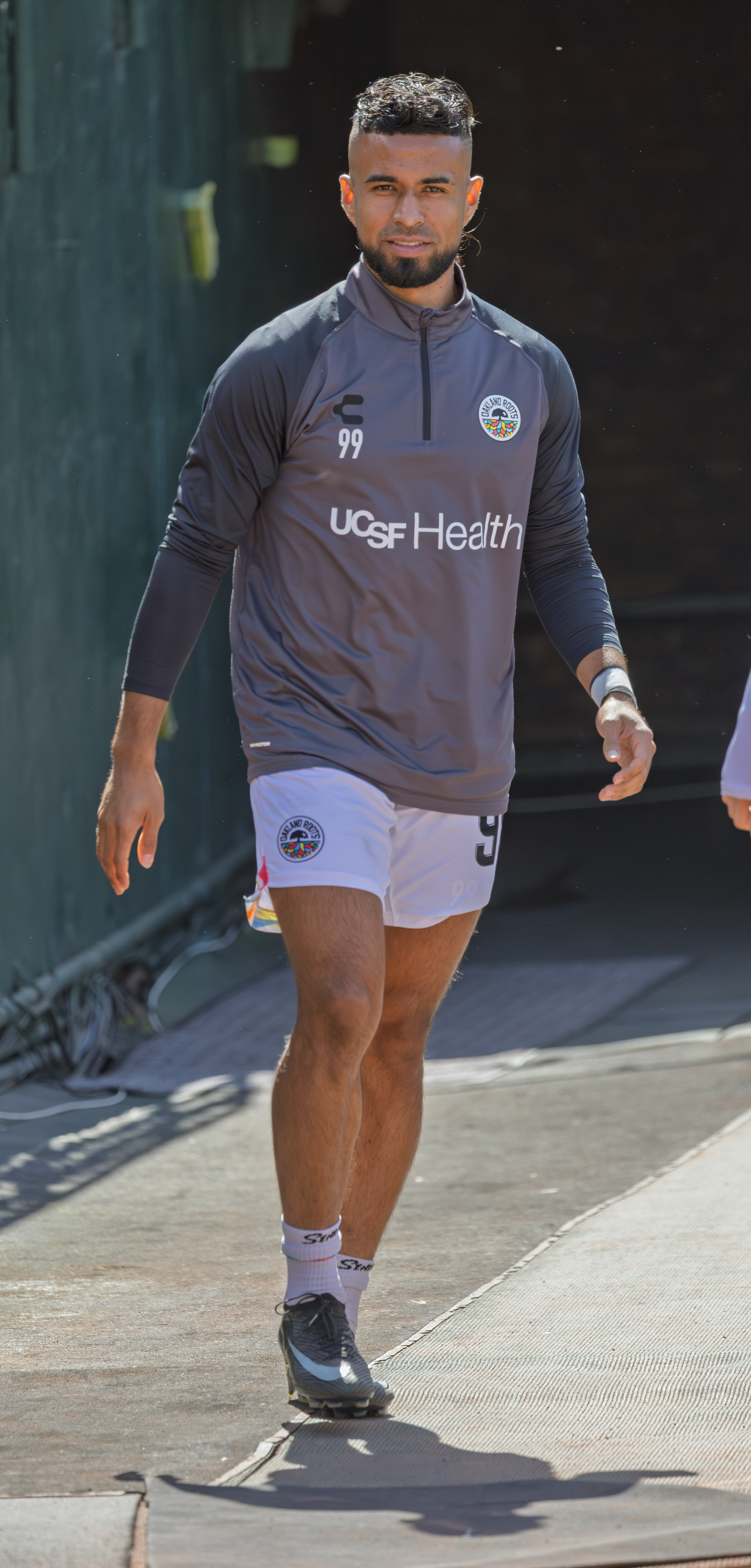
- Trejo in 2026

Personal information
- Full name: Daniel Trejo
- Date of birth: 29 April 1998 (age 28)
- Place of birth: Morelia, Mexico
- Height: 1.75 m (5 ft 9 in)
- Positions: Attacking midfielder; winger

Team information
- Current team: Oakland Roots
- Number: 99

College career
Years	Team	Apps	(Gls)
2017–2020	CSUN Matadors	58	(26)

Senior career*
Years	Team	Apps	(Gls)
2018	Portland Timbers U23s	5	(0)
2019	FC Golden State Force	8	(7)
2020	Los Angeles Force	2	(1)
2021–2022	Las Vegas Lights	38	(14)
2022	Los Angeles FC	3	(0)
2022	→ Las Vegas Lights (loan)	6	(4)
2023	Phoenix Rising	33	(19)
2024–2025	Korona Kielce	22	(2)
2025	Birmingham Legion	15	(3)
2025–	Oakland Roots	33	(5)
- * Club domestic league appearances and goals as of 11:00, 10 November 2026 (UTC)

Daniel "Danny" Trejo (born 29 April 1998) is a Mexican professional footballer who plays as an attacking midfielder for USL Championship club Oakland Roots.

== Career ==
=== College and amateur ===
In 2017, Trejo attended California State University, Northridge to play college soccer. In three seasons with the Matadors, Trejo made 58 appearances, scoring 26 goals and tallying 15 assists. Trejo's achievements at CSUN during his time there include 2019 Big West Offensive Player of the Year, 2019 CSUN Big West Scholar-Athlete of the Year, 2019 Second Team All-Region, 2019 First Team All-Conference, 2019 Academic All-Conference, 2018 Second Team All-Region, 2018 First Team All-Conference, and 2017 Big West All-Freshman Team. The 2020 season in the Big West Conference was cancelled due to the COVID-19 pandemic.

During the 2018 and 2019 seasons, Trejo also played in the USL League Two with Portland Timbers U23s and FC Golden State Force.

=== Professional ===
==== Los Angeles Force ====
In fall 2020, Trejo signed his first professional contract with the Los Angeles Force in the National Independent Soccer Association. He started both of the team's Fall 2020 regular season matches and all four matches in the NISA Fall Championship, including the semifinal against Detroit City FC, and scored a goal against the New York Cosmos in the final group stage match on September 28.

==== Los Angeles FC ====
On 21 January 2021, Trejo was selected 14th overall in the 2021 MLS SuperDraft by Los Angeles FC. On 5 April 2021, it was announced that Trejo had signed with Los Angeles FC's USL Championship affiliate side Las Vegas Lights.

Trejo signed an MLS contract with Los Angeles FC on 19 August 2022. Following the 2022 season, his contract option was declined by Los Angeles.

==== Phoenix Rising ====
Trejo joined USL Championship side Phoenix Rising on 26 January 2023. On 15 August 2023, Trejo was named USL Championship Player of the Week for Week 23 of the 2023 season after notching two goals and two assists during a 5–0 victory over El Paso Locomotive FC. He became a free agent following Phoenix's 2023 season.

==== Korona Kielce ====
On 12 January 2024, Trejo joined Polish Ekstraklasa side Korona Kielce on a two-and-a-half-year contract. He made his league debut on 12 February as a substitute, scoring a volley from outside the box in injury time of a 2–1 win over ŁKS Łódź. On 6 January 2025, he terminated his contract by mutual consent.

==== Birmingham Legion ====
On 23 January 2025, Trejo signed with USL Championship club Birmingham Legion for the 2025 season.

==== Oakland Roots ====
On 13 August 2025, Trejo moved to USL Championship side Oakland Roots.

== Personal life ==
Trejo was born in Morelia, Mexico, but grew up in Mendota, California.

== Career statistics ==
=== Club ===
As of match played 4 November 2024

Appearances and goals by club, season and competition
Club	Season	League			National cup (Note: Includes U.S. Open Cup, Polish Cup)		Continental		Other		Total	
Club	Season	Division	Apps	Goals	Apps	Goals	Apps	Goals	Apps	Goals	Apps	Goals
Portland Timbers U23s	2018	USL2	5	0	—		—		—		5	0
FC Golden State Force	2019	USL2	8	7	1	0	—		3	2	12	9
Los Angeles Force	2020	NISA	2	0	—		—		4	1	6	1
Las Vegas Lights	2021	USL	16	4	—		—		—		16	4
Las Vegas Lights	2022	USL	22	10	1	0	—		—		23	10
Las Vegas Lights	Total		38	14	1	0	—		—		39	14
Los Angeles FC	2022	MLS	3	0	—		—		—		3	0
Las Vegas Lights (loan)	2022	USL	4	2	—		—		—		4	2
Phoenix Rising FC	2023	USL	33	17	4	2	—		—		37	19
Korona Kielce	2023–24	Ekstraklasa	13	2	1	0	—		—		14	2
Korona Kielce	2024–25	Ekstraklasa	9	0	1	1	—		—		10	1
Korona Kielce	Total		22	2	2	1	—		—		24	3
Career total			115	42	8	3	0	0	7	3	130	48

== Honours ==
Los Angeles FC

- Supporters' Shield: 2022

Phoenix Rising

- USL Championship: 2023
