= Henry Uzochukwu =

Nigerian footballer (born 1999)

Personal information
- Full name: Henry Uzochukwu Onuorah
- Date of birth: January 22, 1999 (age 27)
- Place of birth: Obosi, Nigeria
- Height: 1.70 m (5 ft 7 in)
- Position: Right-back

Team information
- Current team: Sūduva
- Number: 4

Youth career
- United Star Soccer Academy
- Kwara State Football Academy
- –2017: Ebedei
- 2017–2018: Midtjylland

Senior career*
Years	Team	Apps	(Gls)
2018–2021	Midtjylland	0	(0)
2018–2020	→ Fredericia (loan)	48	(3)
2021–2022	KuPS	32	(0)
2022	KuPS Akatemia	1	(2)
2023	Phoenix Rising	21	(0)
2024–	Sūduva	70	(5)
- * Club domestic league appearances and goals as of 21 July 2026

Henry Uzochukwu Onuorah (born 22 January 1999) is a Nigerian footballer who currently plays for A Lyga club Sūduva.

== Career ==
Uzochukwu played with the United Stars Soccer Academy, the Kwara State Football Academy and later with Nigerian side FC Ebedei before joining Midtjylland in January 2017. He spent three consecutive seasons on loan with Danish 1st Division side Fredericia, where he made 46 regular season appearances.

In 2021, Uzochukwu moved to Finnish Veikkausliiga side KuPS for an undisclosed fee, where he played for two seasons, which included twelve appearances in the UEFA Europa Conference League, scoring one goal.

On 22 November 2022, Uzochukwu was announced as a new signing for USL Championship side Phoenix Rising ahead of their 2023 season.

== Career statistics ==
As of 27 November 2024.

Appearances and goals by club, season and competition
Club	Season	League			Cup (Note: Includes Danish Cup, Suomen Cup, US Open Cup and Lithuanian Cup)		Continental		Other		Total	
Club	Season	Division	Apps	Goals	Apps	Goals	Apps	Goals	Apps	Goals	Apps	Goals
Fredericia (loan)	2018–19	Danish 1st Division	12	0	2	0	–		–		14	0
Fredericia (loan)	2019–20	Danish 1st Division	24	2	3	1	–		–		27	3
Fredericia (loan)	2020–21	Danish 1st Division	12	1	–		–		–		12	1
Fredericia (loan)	Total		48	3	5	1	–	–	–	–	53	4
KuPS	2021	Veikkausliiga	19	0	1	0	7 (Note: Includes UEFA Europa Conference League)	1	–		27	1
KuPS	2022	Veikkausliiga	13	0	4	0	5	0	3 (Note: Includes Finnish League Cup)	0	25	0
KuPS	Total		32	0	5	0	12	1	3	0	52	1
KuPS Akatemia	2022	Kakkonen	1	2	–		–		–		1	2
Phoenix Rising	2023	USL Championship	25	0	2	0	–		–		27	0
Sūduva	2024	A Lyga	21	1	1	0	–		–		22	1
Career total			127	6	13	1	12	1	3	0	155	8
