= Daniël Krutzen =

Dutch footballer (born 1996)

Daniel Krutzen
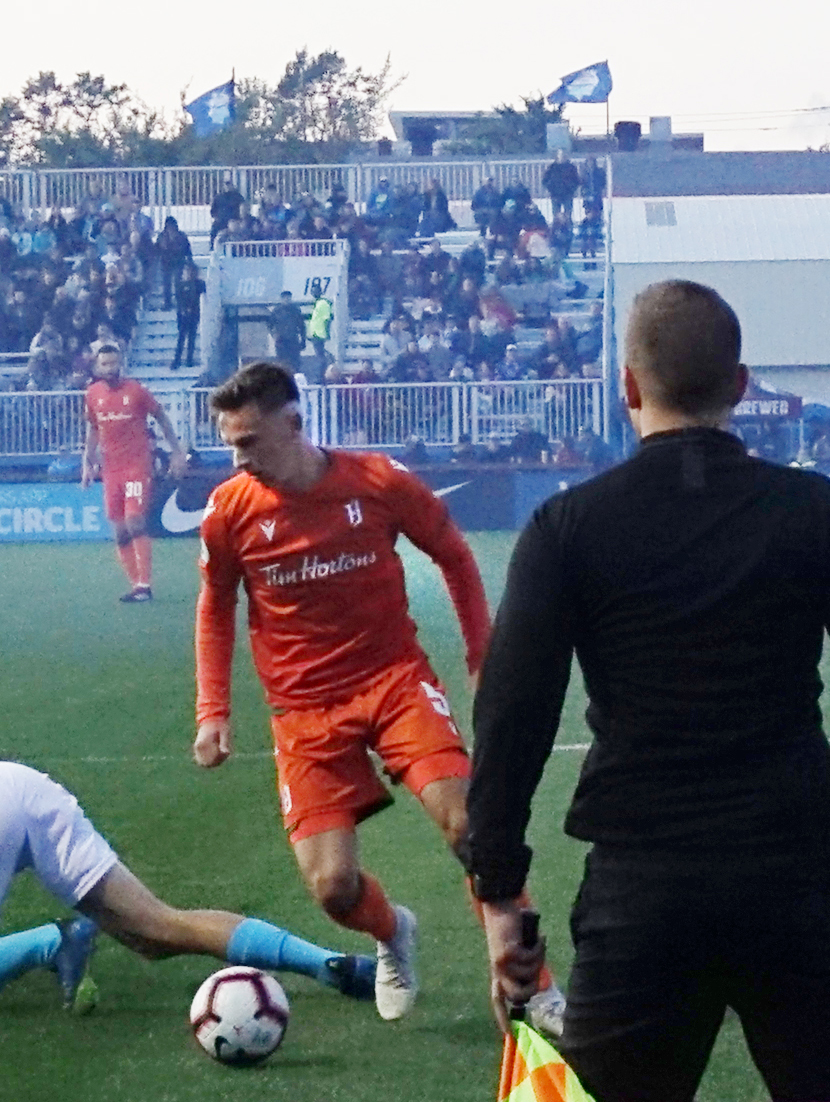
- Krutzen with Forge FC in 2019

Personal information
- Full name: Daniël Nicolas Maria Johanes Krutzen
- Date of birth: 19 September 1996 (age 30)
- Place of birth: Brunssum, Netherlands
- Height: 1.83 m (6 ft 0 in)
- Position: Defender

Youth career
- –2003: K. Lanaken VV
- 2003–2016: Genk

College career
Years	Team	Apps	(Gls)
2016–2018	Albany Great Danes	55	(8)

Senior career*
Years	Team	Apps	(Gls)
2017	FC Tucson	7	(5)
2018	Reading United	9	(2)
2019–2022	Forge FC	57	(6)
2023	Phoenix Rising	25	(0)
2026–	Forge FC	17	(1)
Total		98	(13)
- * Club domestic league appearances and goals as of 25 October 2026

Daniël Nicolas Maria Johanes Krutzen (born 19 September 1996) is a Dutch professional footballer who plays as a defender for Canadian Premier League club Forge FC.

== Early life ==
Born in Brunssum, Netherlands, Krutzen was raised in Lanaken, Belgium. Krutzen began his youth career with K. Lanaken VV. In 2003, he joined the Genk youth academy. In 2014, he signed a professional contract with Genk. In 2016, he was released by Genk.

== College career ==
In 2016, Krutzen moved to the United States to attend the University at Albany, SUNY, where he played for the men's soccer team. He scored his first collegiate goal on 17 September 2016, in a 1–0 victory over the Rhode Island Rams. In his second season in 2017, he led the America East Conference with seven assists, en route to being named an America East First Team All-Star, All-East First Team All-Star, All-America Third-Team, Scholar All-America First Team, Scholar All-East America East All-Academic. On 9 October 2018, he set a school record, recording four assists in a single game in a 6–2 victory over the American Eagles. In 2018, he was named to America East Fall Scholar-Athlete, SUNY Presidential Scholar-Athlete, USC Scholar All-America Second Team, Senior CLASS Second Team, USC Scholar All-East First Team, USC All-Northeast Second Team, and an America East All-Academic.

== Club career ==
=== Early career ===
In 2017, he played for FC Tucson in the Premier Development League, scoring five goals in seven appearances.

In 2018, he played for Reading United AC in the Premier Development League, scoring two goals in nine appearances. After the season, he was ranked seventh on the PDL Top Prospects list.

=== Forge FC ===
In March 2019, he signed a professional contract with Forge FC in the Canadian Premier League. He made his debut on 4 May 2019 against HFX Wanderers FC. In his first season with the club in 2019, he helped them win the championship. The following season, he again won the league title while leading the league in both interceptions and defensive touches. On 4 November 2020, he scored a stoppage time winner against Panamanian club Tauro FC to send Forge through to the quarter-finals of the CONCACAF League.

In January 2021, he went on trial with Swedish clubs Örebro SK, followed by a trial with another Swedish club Helsingborgs IF. In February 2021, he signed a two-year extension with Forge. On 24 November 2021, he tore his ACL in a CONCACAF League match against Honduran club FC Motagua, which forced him to miss ten months of action. He returned to action near the end of the 2022 season, helping Forge win the 2022 CPL championship for the third time in four years. He departed the club following that season. Following Forge FC's 2022 season, Krutzen was reported to be training with Whitecaps FC 2. He was then subsequently invited to trial with the Vancouver Whitecaps first team for their 2023 pre-season. After appearing in a friendly for the Whitecaps against German club Hamburger SV, he departed the Whitecaps without earning a contract.

=== Phoenix Rising FC and retirement ===
In January 2023, Krutzen signed with USL Championship side Phoenix Rising FC. He won the league title in his debut season with the club.

Krutzen announced his retirement from professional football on 1 December 2023, citing persistent knee injuries as the main reason behind his choice.

=== Return to Forge FC ===
On 23 December 2025, Forge FC announced that Krutzen would be rejoining the club for the 2026 season, coming out of retirement.

== Career statistics ==
As of 24 October 2023

Appearances and goals by club, season and competition
Club	Season	League			Playoffs		National cup		Continental		Total	
Club	Season	Division	Apps	Goals	Apps	Goals	Apps	Goals	Apps	Goals	Apps	Goals
FC Tucson	2017	Premier Development League	7	5	0	0	1	0	—		8	5
Reading United	2018	Premier Development League	9	2	0	0	1	0	—		10	2
Forge FC	2019	Canadian Premier League	26	1	2	0	2	0	4 (Note: Appearances in the CONCACAF League.)	1	34	2
Forge FC	2020	Canadian Premier League	10	2	1	0	—		4	2	15	4
Forge FC	2021	Canadian Premier League	19	3	1	0	2	0	5	0	27	3
Forge FC	2022	Canadian Premier League	2	0	2	0	0	0	0	0	4	0
Forge FC	Total		57	6	6	0	4	0	13	3	80	9
Phoenix Rising	2023	USL Championship	25	0	1	0	2	0	—		28	0
Career total			98	13	7	0	8	0	13	3	126	16

== Honours ==
Forge FC

- Canadian Premier League: 2019, 2020, 2022
- Canadian Championship: 2026

Phoenix Rising FC

- USL Championship: 2023
