= Erickson Gallardo =

Venezuelan footballer (born 1996)

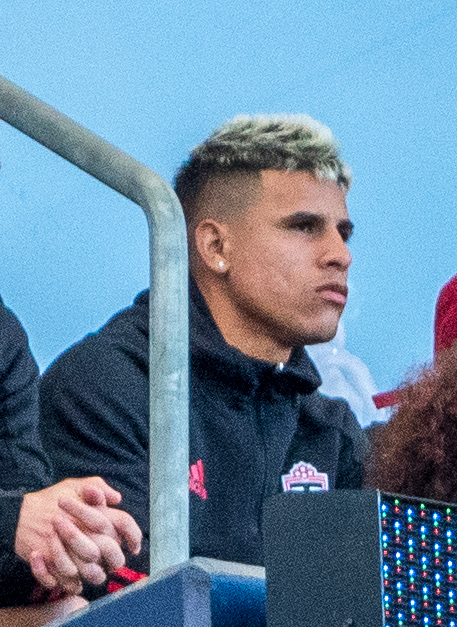
- Gallardo with Toronto FC in 2020

Personal information
- Full name: Erickson Yirson Gallardo Toro
- Date of birth: 26 July 1996 (age 30)
- Place of birth: Barinas, Venezuela
- Height: 1.67 m (5 ft 6 in)
- Position: Winger

Team information
- Current team: Zamora

Youth career
- Fundarleo Raúl Leoni
- Santa Bárbara
- Potros de Barinas FC
- 2013–2015: Zamora

Senior career*
| Years | Team | Apps | (Gls) |
| 2014–2019 | Zamora | 117 | (11) |
| 2019–2021 | Toronto FC | 11 | (0) |
| 2021 | → Toronto FC II (loan) | 3 | (0) |
| 2022 | Zamora | 31 | (10) |
| 2023–2024 | Phoenix Rising | 36 | (1) |
| 2024 | Carabobo | 21 | (1) |
| 2025 | Monagas | 5 | (0) |
| 2025- | Zamora | 6 | (0) |

International career^{‡}
| 2019– | Venezuela | 3 | (0) |
- * Club domestic league appearances and goals as of 9 July 2024 ‡ National team caps and goals as of 22 September 2022

Erickson Yirson Gallardo Toro (born 26 July 1996) is a Venezuelan professional footballer who plays as a winger for Zamora in the Venezuelan Primera División.

== Early life ==
He began playing football at the age of four at the Fundarleo Raúl Leoni, where he was coached by his father. He later played youth football with Santa Bárbara and Potros de Barinas FC, before joining Zamora FC at age 17.

== Club career ==
He made his first team debut for Zamora on 16 February 2014 against Atlético El Vigía. After limited appearances in his first couple of years, he became a regular player in the 2016 season as a nineteen year old. In the second leg of the 2018 Apertura Final, Gallardo scored the winning goal in a 1–0 victory, giving Zamora the title winning 2–1 on aggregate. Over his time with the club, he won four league titles in 2014, 2015, 2016 and 2018.

In July 2019, he signed with Toronto FC in Major League Soccer, after Toronto acquired his MLS rights from Orlando City SC, who had Gallardo on their Discovery List, in exchange for $50,000 of General Allocation Money. After suffering a quad strain shortly after joining the club, he made his debut for Toronto on 7 August 2019 in a Canadian Championship match against Ottawa Fury FC. He recorded his first MLS assist on 15 September against the Colorado Rapids. In his debut season in which he arrived mid-season, he only made five appearances, which coach Greg Vanney attributed to his late arrival to the team, opting to go with the players who had played all season due to their familiarity with the system. He did not make any appearances in the playoffs as Toronto advanced to the MLS Cup finals, where they finished as runner-ups. In a CONCACAF Champions League match on 7 April 2021 against Mexican side León, after coming on as a substitute, Gallardo created the tying goal in the first leg, intercepting the ball before making a pass which was deflected by a defender for an own goal, but later had to leave the match due to suffering an injury, requiring him to undergo right groin surgery. In 2021, after recovering from his injury, he was loaned to Toronto FC II for some matches. At the end of the 2021 season, Gallardo's contract expired and he departed the club.

In 2022, he returned to Zamora, joining them in preseason, despite interest from several other clubs, including MLS club Inter Miami CF. In his debut, he scored a goal in a 2–0 victory over Estudiantes de Mérida.

On November 9, 2022, Gallardo signed with Phoenix Rising FC of the USL Championship for the 2023 season.

Gallardo returned to the Venezuelan Primera División in July 2024, transferring to Carabobo.

== International career ==
In May 2019, he earned his first callup to the Venezuela national team. He made his debut in a 1–1 friendly tie with Ecuador on 1 June 2019, playing seven minutes in a substitute appearance. In June 2022, he was called up to the national team again, after a three-year absence, for matches against Malta and Saudi Arabia, but was an unused substitute.

== Personal ==
Gallardo's nickname in Venezuelan football is Meteoro (Meteor) due to his speed. In 2019, Gallardo and his wife had a daughter, born in Canada.

== Career statistics ==
=== Club ===
As of match played 13 November 2023

Appearances and goals by club, season and competition
| Club | Season | League | | | Playoffs | | Cup | | Continental | | Total | |
| Club | Season | Division | Apps | Goals | Apps | Goals | Apps | Goals | Apps | Goals | Apps | Goals |
|---|---|---|---|---|---|---|---|---|---|---|---|---|
| Zamora | 2013–14 | Venezuelan Primera División | 1 | 0 | — | | 0 | 0 | 0 | 0 | 1 | 0 |
| Zamora | 2014–15 | Venezuelan Primera División | 3 | 0 | — | | 0 | 0 | 0 | 0 | 3 | 0 |
| Zamora | 2015 | Venezuelan Primera División | 5 | 0 | — | | 1 | 0 | 0 | 0 | 6 | 0 |
| Zamora | 2016 | Venezuelan Primera División | 23 | 3 | — | | 4 | 0 | 3 (Note: Appearance(s) in Copa Sudamericana) | 0 | 30 | 3 |
| Zamora | 2017 | Venezuelan Primera División | 32 | 1 | — | | 7 | 0 | 6 (Note: Appearance(s) in Copa Libertadores) | 1 | 45 | 2 |
| Zamora | 2018 | Venezuelan Primera División | 38 | 6 | — | | 6 | 4 | 2 | 0 | 46 | 10 |
| Zamora | 2019 | Venezuelan Primera División | 15 | 1 | — | | 0 | 0 | 6 | 1 | 21 | 2 |
| Zamora | Total | | 117 | 11 | — | | 18 | 4 | 17 | 2 | 152 | 17 |
| Toronto FC | 2019 | Major League Soccer | 5 | 0 | 0 | 0 | 3 | 0 | 0 | 0 | 8 | 0 |
| Toronto FC | 2020 | Major League Soccer | 6 | 0 | 1 | 0 | 0 | 0 | — | | 7 | 0 |
| Toronto FC | 2021 | Major League Soccer | 0 | 0 | — | | 0 | 0 | 1 (Note: Appearance(s) in CONCACAF Champions League) | 0 | 1 | 0 |
| Toronto FC | Total | | 11 | 0 | 1 | 0 | 3 | 0 | 1 | 0 | 16 | 0 |
| Toronto FC II (loan) | 2021 | USL League One | 3 | 0 | — | | — | | — | | 3 | 0 |
| Zamora | 2022 | Venezuelan Primera División | 31 | 10 | — | | 0 | 0 | — | | 31 | 10 |
| Phoenix Rising | 2023 | USL Championship | 17 | 1 | 4 | 0 | 2 | 0 | — | | 23 | 1 |
| Career total | | | 179 | 32 | 3 | 0 | 23 | 4 | 18 | 2 | 226 | 28 |

=== International ===
As of match played 22 September 2022

Appearances and goals by national team and year
| National team | Year | Apps | Goals |
|---|---|---|---|
| Venezuela | 2019 | 1 | 0 |
| Venezuela | 2020 | 0 | 0 |
| Venezuela | 2021 | 0 | 0 |
| Venezuela | 2022 | 2 | 0 |
| Total | | 3 | 0 |
