= Time in Arizona =

Time standard in the state of Arizona

- Time zone
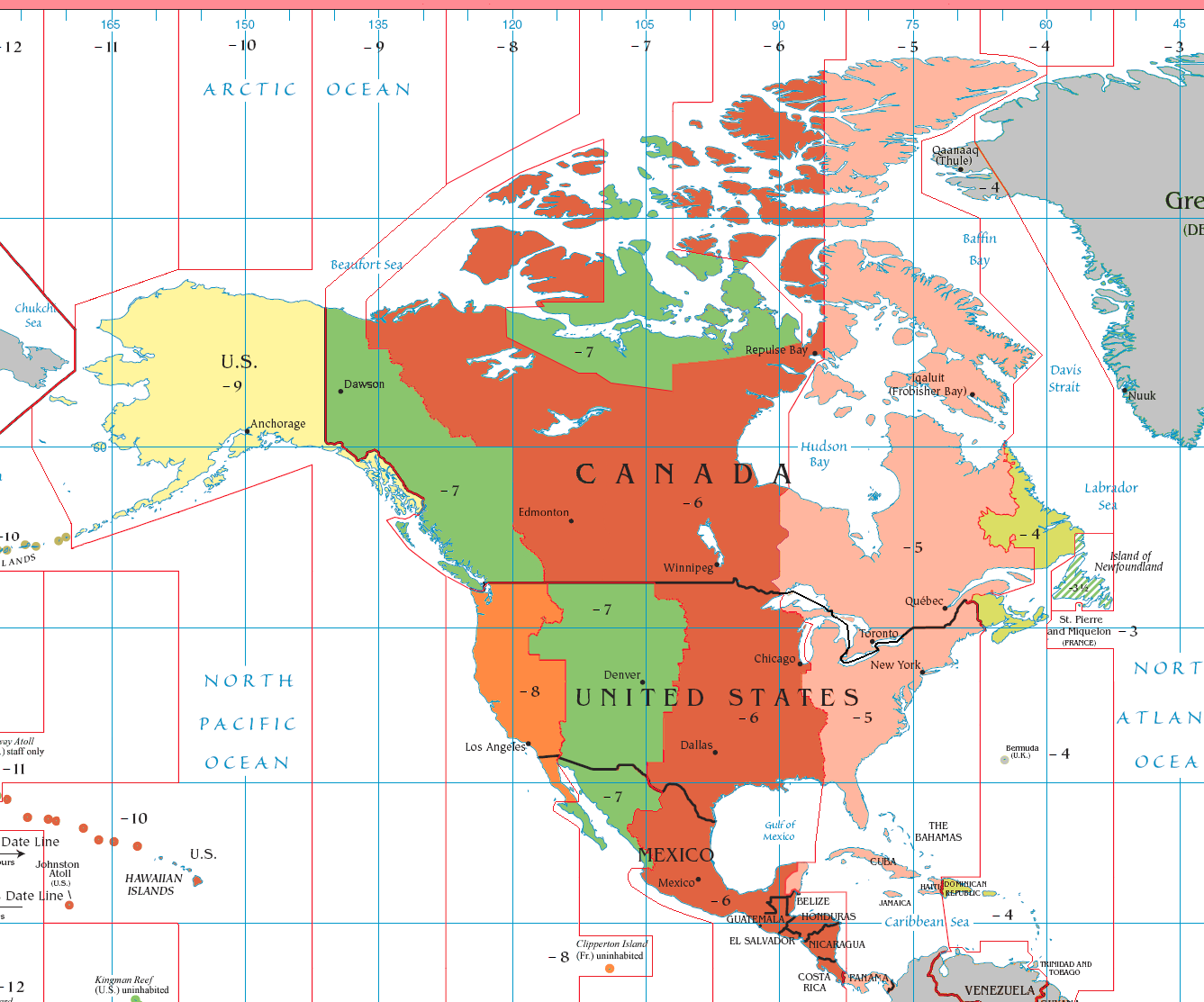
- Mountain Time Zone

UTC offset
- MST: UTC−07:00
- MDT: UTC−06:00

Current time
- 21:58, 15 September 2026 MST [refresh] 22:58, 15 September 2026 MDT [refresh]

Observance of DST
- DST is observed in some of this time zone.

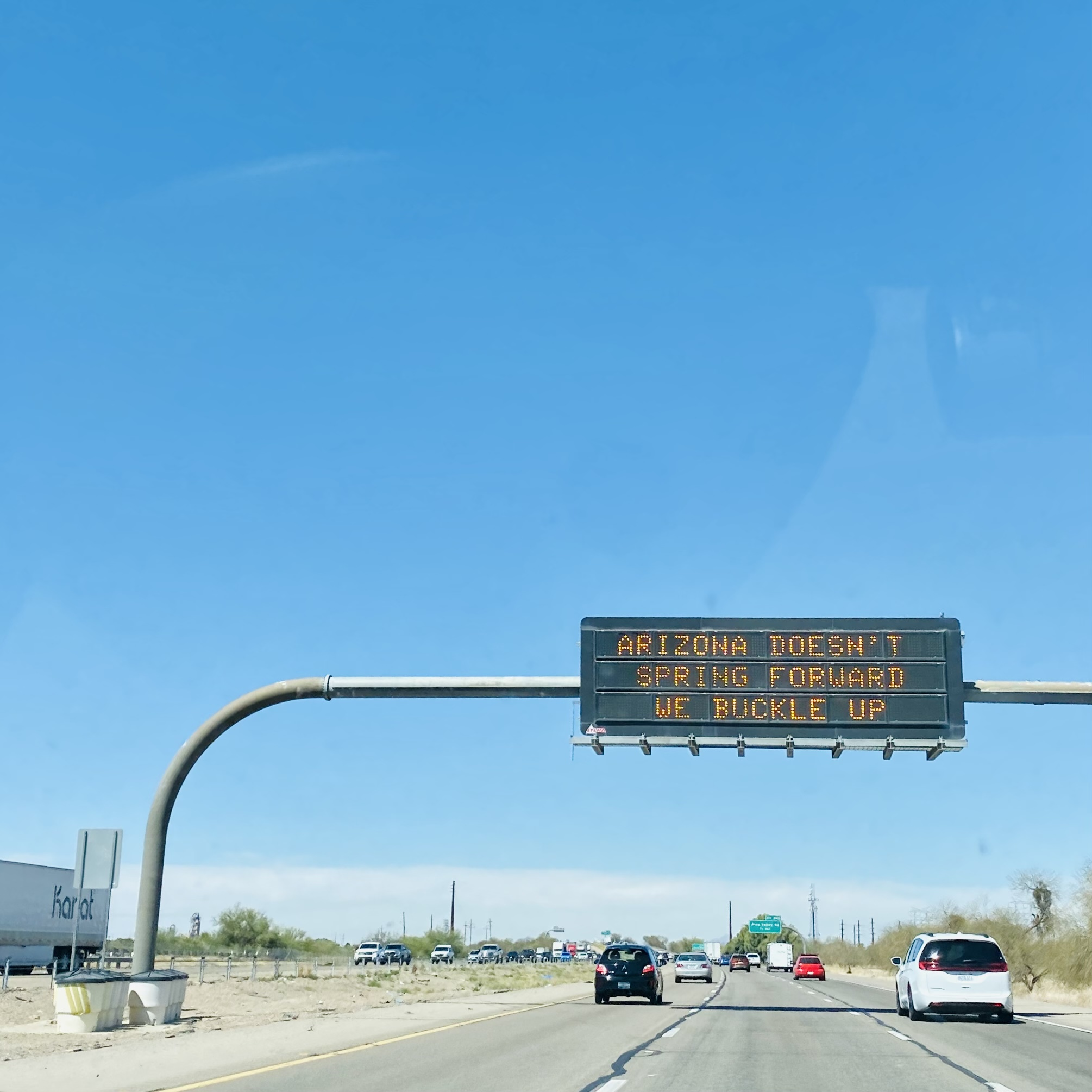
Arizona highway sign with notice for travelers about local time standard.

Time in Arizona, as in all U.S. states, is regulated by the United States Department of Transportation as well as by state and tribal law.

Most of Arizona is in the Mountain Time Zone and observes Mountain Time. Since 1968, most of the state—except the Navajo Nation—does not observe daylight saving time and remains on Mountain Standard Time (MST) all year. This results in most of Arizona having the same time as neighboring California and Nevada (outside of selected Nevada municipalities that officially or informally observe Mountain Time) each year from March to November, when locations in the Pacific Time Zone observe daylight saving time. From November to March, clocks across the state match those in neighboring Utah and New Mexico.

== Daylight saving time ==
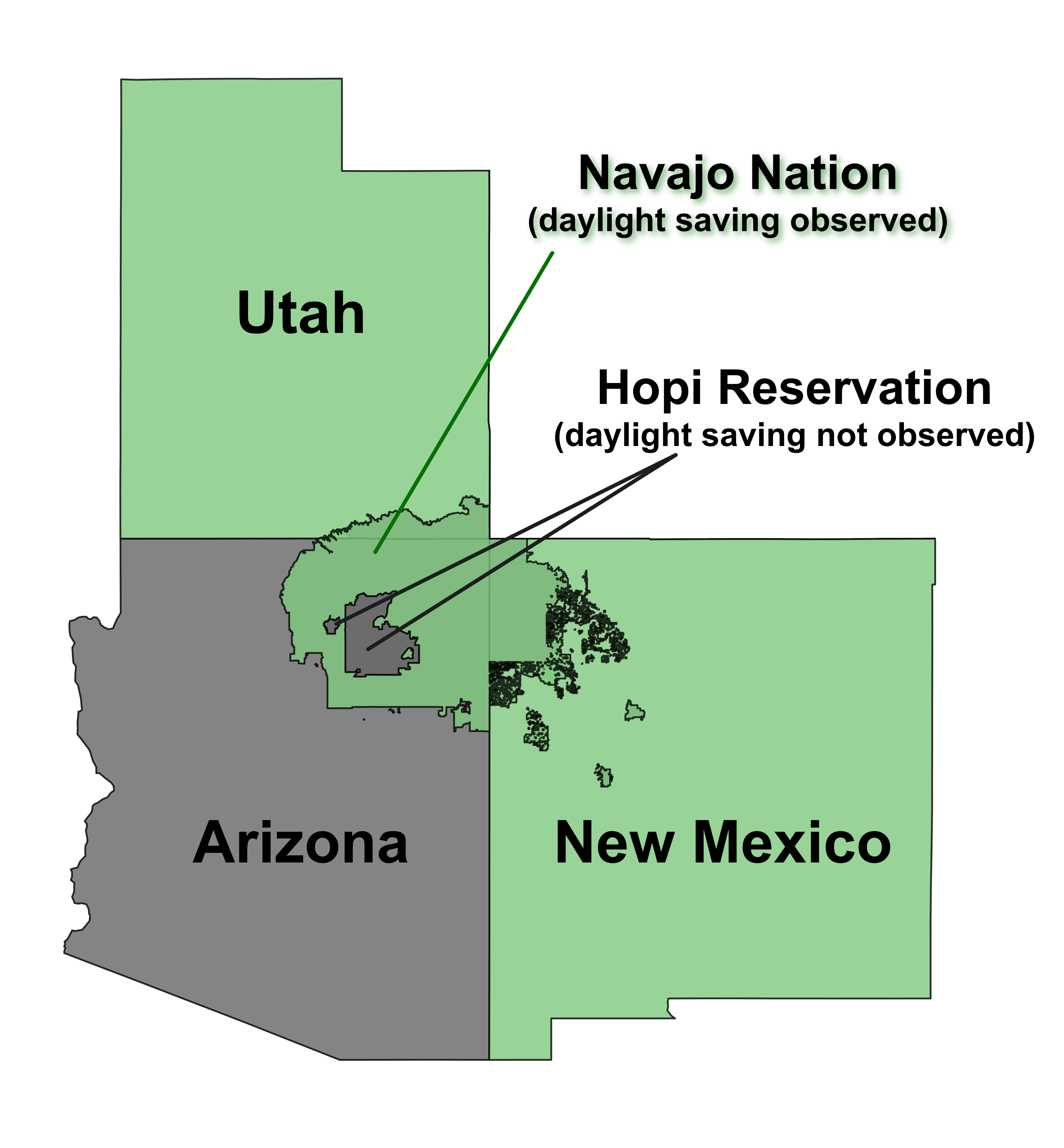
Daylight saving time (DST) observance across Arizona. Green regions observe DST, grey do not.

Unlike most of the United States, Arizona does not observe daylight saving time (DST), with the exception of the Navajo Nation. The Hopi Reservation, although entirely surrounded by the Navajo Nation, also does not observe DST. As a result, traveling east on Arizona State Route 264 from Tuba City during DST involves six time zone changes in less than 100 miles (160 km).

=== Background ===
Daylight saving time became official when the Uniform Time Act became law in 1966. However, states were allowed to opt out, which Arizona did. On March 21, 1968, the Arizona legislature passed the final version of SB 1, placing Arizona on Mountain Standard Time year-round. The bill had been working its way through the legislature since January of that year, and was sponsored by state Senators Tenney, Goetze, Porter, Halacy, Garfield, Campbell, Lewis, Gregovich, Giss, Crowley, and Holsclaw. It passed the Senate 25–3–2, and afterwards the bill was passed by the House 49–1–10. It was approved by Governor Jack Williams the same day.

=== Reasoning ===
Arizona’s hot desert climate is widely cited as the primary reason the state remains on standard time year-round, as daylight saving time would draw outdoor activities scheduled for evening hours into earlier daylight and into the hotter parts of the day. In addition, although daylight saving time was intended to conserve energy, it proved counterproductive in Arizona by increasing demand for air conditioning.

=== Exception ===
The Navajo Nation, a semi-autonomous Native American territory, follows the DST schedule that most other states/territories of the United States follow. It lies in northeastern Arizona, northwestern New Mexico, and southeastern Utah and thus maintains the same time throughout tribal lands despite state borders.

=== Example ===
When daylight saving is not active, the time in Phoenix and Albuquerque, New Mexico, is the same (Mountain Standard Time), and both are one hour ahead of Los Angeles, California (Pacific Standard Time).

When daylight saving is active, the time in Phoenix (Mountain Standard Time) and Los Angeles (Pacific Daylight Time) is the same, and both are one hour behind Albuquerque (Mountain Daylight Time).

As the Navajo Nation recognizes daylight saving time, the time there is always the same as in Albuquerque.

Example of times
Time	California	Arizona		New Mexico	Ref.
Time	Los Angeles	Phoenix	Navajo Nation	Albuquerque	Ref.
Standard time (winter)	1 p.m. PST	2 p.m. MST	2 p.m. MST	2 p.m. MST	
Daylight time (summer)	2 p.m. PDT	2 p.m. MST	3 p.m. MDT	3 p.m. MDT	

== tz database ==
The tz database version 2026d contains two entries for Arizona:

CC	Coordinates	TZ	Comments	UTC offset	UTC offset DST	Notes
US	+332654−1120424	America/Phoenix	MST – AZ (most areas), Creston BC	−07:00		
US	+394421−1045903	America/Denver	Mountain (most areas)	−07:00	−06:00	
