= Panos Armenakas =

Australian soccer player (born 1998)

Personal information
- Full name: Panayioti Dimitri Armenakas
- Date of birth: 5 August 1998 (age 28)
- Place of birth: Newport Beach, California, United States
- Height: 1.79 m (5 ft 10 1/2 in)
- Position: Winger

Youth career
- 2002–2010: Sydney Olympic
- 2011–2012: Brescia
- 2012–2014: Watford
- 2014–2017: Udinese

Senior career*
Years	Team	Apps	(Gls)
2017–2018	Udinese	0	(0)
2017–2018	→ Tubize (loan)	6	(0)
2019–2020	Panathinaikos	3	(0)
2020	Roeselare	0	(0)
2020–2021	Zulte Waregem	9	(2)
2021–2022	Vendsyssel	41	(3)
2023	Loudoun United	12	(1)
2023–2024	Phoenix Rising	39	(5)
2024	Memphis 901	11	(1)
2025	Oakland Roots	27	(1)
2026–	Sydney Olympic	10	(1)

International career
2014	Greece U17	2	(0)
2014–2015	Australia U17	7	(0)
2017–2021	Australia U23	7	(1)
- * Club domestic league appearances and goals as of 31 August 2026

Panayioti "Panos" Armenakas (Greek: Παναγιώτης "Πάνος" Αρμενάκας; born 5 August 1998) is a professional soccer player who plays as a right winger. Born in the United States, he has most recently represented Australia at youth level.

Armenakas has played youth football for Sydney Olympic, Watford and Udinese. Originally, Armenakas represented Greece internationally before switching to Australia.

== Early life ==
Armenakas was born in Newport Beach, California, United States, before moving to Sydney, New South Wales, Australia at a young age. He is of Greek descent.

== Club career ==
=== Youth ===
Armenakas started his youth career playing for Sydney Olympic, after being scouted in a park by ex-Socceroo Jim Patikas. At the age of six, he was invited to spend three weeks training with Barcelona's elite juniors squad. While in Europe, he also spent time with Bolton Wanderers. Armenakas trained with the Milan Soccer School in Sydney under Andrea Icardi and Misha Radovic, before trialing with AC Milan in early 2010. In late 2010, he moved to Europe, initially joining Brescia before signing with Watford's youth academy.

=== Udinese ===
After spending two years with Watford, Armenakas signed a three-year deal with Udinese. By signing with the Italian club, Panos became the youngest Australian ever to sign a professional contract in any of the top five leagues in Europe. In November 2015, Armenakas signed a contract extension, keeping him at Udinese until 2018. He was released at the end of the 2017–18 season having made no appearances for the senior team and only featuring in one matchday squad.

==== Loan to Tubize ====
In July 2017, Armenakas joined Tubize in the Belgian First Division B on a one-year loan to have a chance at first team football. He was mostly an unused substitute during his time in Belgium, making six appearances.

=== Panathinaikos ===
After a trial period of three weeks, Armenakas signed a 2 1/2-year contract with Greek club Panathinaikos at the beginning of January 2019. He left the Greens in January 2020 after only three appearances.

=== Return to Belgium ===
Armenakas joined Roeselare in September 2020 but the club collapsed just ten days later. After this, he trained for eight weeks with Zulte Waregem, before signing a contract until the end of the season in November, with an option for a further year. He scored twice in ten games before leaving the club at the end of the season.

=== Vendsyssel FF ===
On 7 August 2021, Armenakas joined Danish 1st Division club Vendsyssel FF, signing a deal until June 2024.

== International career ==
He has triple nationality and he is eligible to play for Greece, the United States and Australia.

Armenakas initially represented Greece at under-17 level, playing in two friendly matches against Turkey in August 2014.

In late 2014, Armenakas accepted a call up to the Australian under-17 squad to play in the 2014 Nike International Friendlies tournament in the United States, where he made his debut in a loss to Brazil in November 2014. In October 2015, he was selected in Australia's 21-man squad for the 2015 FIFA U-17 World Cup in Chile. During this time, he was also selected by The Guardian as one of the fifty best young talents in world football.

He progressed onto the under-23 national team, where he was selected for friendly games on multiple occasions but was not included for the final squads for the 2018 AFC U-23 Championship, 2020 AFC U-23 Championship or the 2020 Summer Olympics.

== Career statistics ==
As of 18 April 2021

Appearances and goals by club, season and competition
Club	Season	League			National cup (Note: Includes Belgian Cup)		Europe		Other		Total	
Club	Season	Division	Apps	Goals	Apps	Goals	Apps	Goals	Apps	Goals	Apps	Goals
Tubize (loan)	2017–18	Belgian First Division B	6	0	0	0	—		0	0	6	0
Panathinaikos	2018–19	Super League Greece	3	0	0	0	—		0	0	3	0
Zulte Waregem	2020–21	Belgian First Division A	9	2	1	0	—		0	0	10	2
Vendsyssel	2021–22	Danish 1st Division	1	1	0	0	—		0	0	1	1
Career total			19	3	1	0	0	0	0	0	20	3
