= John Stenberg =

Swedish footballer

Personal information
- Full name: John Holger Michael Stenberg
- Date of birth: 12 October 1992 (age 34)
- Place of birth: Gothenburg, Sweden
- Height: 1.91 m (6 ft 3 in)
- Position: Defender

Team information
- Current team: Örebro SK
- Number: 32

Youth career
- Bjärreds IF
- –2010: IFK Åmål

Senior career*
Years	Team	Apps	(Gls)
2010–2015	IFK Åmål		
2015–2018	Carlstad United	51	(0)
2018–2019	Karlstad BK	18	(0)
2020–2021	Dalkurd FF	29	(4)
2021–2022	Östers IF	57	(3)
2023–2024	Phoenix Rising	22	(1)
2023	→ Östers IF (loan)	12	(0)
2025–	Örebro SK	43	(1)
- * Club domestic league appearances and goals as of 12 November 2026

John Holger Michael Stenberg (born 12 October 1992) is a Swedish professional footballer who plays as a defender for Örebro SK in the second tier league Superettan.

== Club career ==
=== Phoenix Rising FC ===
In December 2022, Stenberg signed with Phoenix Rising FC Stenberg was loaned back to Östers IF on 6 March 2023 due to issues with his work visa. He was recalled to join Phoenix in August 2023.

=== Örebro SK ===
On 10 June 2025 Stenberg signed for Örebro SK. He has signed a contract through the 2026 season.
