= Eddie Munjoma =

American soccer player (born 1998)

Personal information
- Full name: Edwin Munjoma
- Date of birth: July 18, 1998 (age 28)
- Place of birth: McKinney, Texas, United States
- Height: 5 ft 10 in (1.78 m)
- Position: Defender

Team information
- Current team: Forward Madison
- Number: 23

Youth career
- 2011–2016: FC Dallas

College career
Years	Team	Apps	(Gls)
2016–2019	SMU Mustangs	66	(12)

Senior career*
Years	Team	Apps	(Gls)
2020–2022	FC Dallas	15	(0)
2020–2021	North Texas SC	14	(5)
2023–2024	Phoenix Rising	33	(2)
2024	Tampa Bay Rowdies	31	(0)
2025–	Forward Madison	34	(2)

International career^{‡}
2016	United States U19	5	(0)
- * Club domestic league appearances and goals as of October 31, 2026 ‡ National team caps and goals as of October 7, 2020

Edwin Munjoma (born July 18, 1998) is an American professional soccer player who plays as a defender for USL League One club Forward Madison.

== Career ==
=== Youth and college ===
Munjomoa joined the FC Dallas academy in 2011, before heading to Southern Methodist University to play college soccer. At SMU, Munjoma made 66 appearances, scoring 12 goals and tallying 22 assists. During his time with the Mustangs, Munjoma was East Region First Team Selection by United Soccer Coaches and AAC defensive player of the year. He was also a 2019 MAC Hermann Trophy semifinalist.

=== Professional ===
On January 13, 2020, Munjoma signed with MLS side FC Dallas as a homegrown player, the 27th in the club's history.

He made his professional debut on October 7, 2020, starting for Dallas' USL League One affiliate side North Texas SC in a fixture against Chattanooga Red Wolves. On October 10, 2020, he scored his first career goal in 2–1 victory over Richmond Kickers.

Munjoma was released by Dallas following the 2022 season.

Munjoma was signed by Phoenix Rising FC on January 13, 2023. Munjoma transferred to Tampa Bay Rowdies on March 29, 2024. He left Tampa Bay following their 2024 season.

Prior to the 2025 season, Munjoma was signed to a 25-day contract by Forward Madison.

== Personal life ==
Born in the United States, Munjoma is of Zimbabwean descent.
