= Mohamed Traore (footballer, born 2002) =

Senegalese football player (born 2002)

Personal information
- Full name: Mohamed Thiemokho Traore
- Date of birth: 15 August 2002 (age 24)
- Place of birth: Dakar, Senegal
- Height: 1.90 m (6 ft 3 in)
- Position: Defender

Team information
- Current team: Sporting JAX
- Number: 99

Youth career
- Montverde Academy

Senior career*
Years	Team	Apps	(Gls)
2020–2023	Los Angeles FC	1	(0)
2021	→ Las Vegas Lights (loan)	23	(1)
2022	→ Las Vegas Lights (loan)	29	(0)
2023	→ Phoenix Rising (loan)	24	(0)
2024–2025	Phoenix Rising	29	(1)
2026–	Sporting JAX	6	(1)
- * Club domestic league appearances and goals as of October 31, 2026

Mohamed Thiemokho Traore (born 15 August 2002) is a Senegalese professional footballer who plays as a defender for USL Championship club Sporting JAX.

== Club career ==
=== Los Angeles FC ===
Born in Dakar, Traore joined soccer institute of Montverde Academy in 2016. On 17 August 2020, Los Angeles FC announced the signing of Traore using the top spot in the MLS waiver order. He made his professional debut on 10 September 2020 in a 3–0 defeat against Real Salt Lake.

=== Phoenix Rising FC ===
On 28 February 2023, Traore was loaned out to USL Championship side Phoenix Rising for the 2023 season.

Traore's contract with Los Angeles FC expired at the end of the 2023 season and he was signed by Phoenix Rising on a permanent basis on 5 January 2024.

=== Sporting JAX ===
On 8 January 2026, Sporting Club Jacksonville, commonly known as Sporting JAX, of USL Championship, announced the addition of Traore to their inaugural roster.

== Career statistics ==
As of match played 15 November 2023

Appearances and goals by club, season and competition
Club	Season	League			Cup		Continental		Other		Total	
Club	Season	Division	Apps	Goals	Apps	Goals	Apps	Goals	Apps	Goals	Apps	Goals
Los Angeles FC	2020	MLS	1	0	—		0	0	—		1	0
Las Vegas Lights (loan)	2021	USL Championship	23	1	—		—		—		23	1
Las Vegas Lights (loan)	2022	USL Championship	26	0	1	1	—		—		27	1
Phoenix Rising	2023	USL Championship	20	0	0	0	—		4	0 (Note: Appearances in the USL Championship play-offs)	24	0
Phoenix Rising	Total		70	1	1	1	0	0	0	0	75	2
Career total			70	1	1	1	0	0	0	0	75	2

== Honors ==
Los Angeles FC

- Supporters' Shield: 2022

Phoenix Rising

- USL Championship: 2023
