= Northern Ireland national football team results (2000–2019) =

- Win Draw Loss

This article lists the results for the Northern Ireland national football team between 2000 and 2019.

== 2000s ==
=== 2000 ===
23 February International Friendly	Luxembourg	1–3	Northern Ireland	Luxembourg City, Luxembourg
19:30 GMT; Match 475	Cardoni 41'	Report	Healy 21', 48'; Quinn 87'	Stadium: Stade Josy Barthel; Attendance: 1,818; Referee: Manfred Schüttengruber (Austria)

28 March International Friendly	Malta	0–3	Northern Ireland	Ta' Qali, Malta
15:00 BST; Match 476		Report	Hughes 14' (pen.); Quinn 16'; Healy 41'	Stadium: Ta' Qali National Stadium; Attendance: 2,556; Referee: Massimo De Santis (Italy)

26 April International Friendly	Northern Ireland	0–1	Hungary	Belfast, Northern Ireland
20:00 BST; Match 477		Report	Horváth 61'	Stadium: Windsor Park; Attendance: 9,140; Referee: Ceri Richards (Wales)

16 August International Friendly	Northern Ireland	1–2	FR Yugoslavia	Belfast, Northern Ireland
20:00 BST; Match 478	Healy 45'	Report	Kežman 63'; Mijatović 78'	Stadium: Windsor Park; Attendance: 6,095; Referee: Willie Young (Scotland)

2 September 2002 FIFA World Cup Group 3 Qualifier	Northern Ireland	1–0	Malta	Belfast, Northern Ireland
15:00 BST; Match 479	Gray 72'	Report		Stadium: Windsor Park; Attendance: 8,227; Referee: Taras Bezubiak (Russia)

7 October 2002 FIFA World Cup Group 3 Qualifier	Northern Ireland	1–1	Denmark	Belfast, Northern Ireland
15:00 BST; Match 480	Healy 38'	Report	Rommedahl 59'	Stadium: Windsor Park; Attendance: 11,823; Referee: Vítor Melo Pereira (Portugal)

11 October 2002 FIFA World Cup Group 3 Qualifier	Iceland	1–0	Northern Ireland	Reykjavík, Iceland
19:30 BST; Match 481	Th. Guðjónsson 88'	Report		Stadium: Laugardalsvöllur; Attendance: 6,780; Referee: Markus Merk (Germany)

=== 2001 ===
28 February International Friendly	Northern Ireland	0–4	Norway	Belfast, Northern Ireland
20:00 GMT; Match 482		Report	Helstad 20', 48'; Carew 30'; Stensaas 38'	Stadium: Windsor Park; Attendance: 7,502; Referee: Kenny Clark (Scotland)

24 March 2002 FIFA World Cup Group 3 Qualifier	Northern Ireland	0–1	Czech Republic	Belfast, Northern Ireland
15:00 GMT; Match 483		Report	Nedvěd 11'	Stadium: Windsor Park; Attendance: 10,368; Referee: Manuel Mejuto González (Spain)

28 March 2002 FIFA World Cup Group 3 Qualifier	Bulgaria	4–3	Northern Ireland	Sofia, Bulgaria
16:00 BST; Match 484	Balakov 7' (pen.); Petrov 17', 77'; Chomakov 72'	Report	Williams 15'; Elliott 83'; Healy 90+1' (pen.)	Stadium: Balgarska Armia Stadium; Attendance: 15,600; Referee: Vladimír Hriňák (Slovakia)

2 June 2002 FIFA World Cup Group 3 Qualifier	Northern Ireland	0–1	Bulgaria	Belfast, Northern Ireland
15:00 BST; Match 485		Report	G. Ivanov 54'	Stadium: Windsor Park; Attendance: 7,609; Referee: Massimo Busacca (Switzerland)

6 June 2002 FIFA World Cup Group 3 Qualifier	Czech Republic	3–1	Northern Ireland	Teplice, Czech Republic
16:00 BST; Match 486	Kuka 40', 87'; Baroš 90'	Report	Mulryne 45'	Stadium: Na Stínadlech; Attendance: 14,050; Referee: Leif Sundell (Sweden)

1 September 2002 FIFA World Cup Group 3 Qualifier	Denmark	1–1	Northern Ireland	Copenhagen, Denmark
18:15 BST; Match 487	Rommedahl 3'	Report	Mulryne 73'	Stadium: Parken Stadium; Attendance: 41,500; Referee: Ryszard Wójcik (Poland)

5 September 2002 FIFA World Cup Group 3 Qualifier	Northern Ireland	3–0	Iceland	Belfast, Northern Ireland
20:00 BST; Match 488	Healy 48'; Hughes 58'; McCartney 61'	Report		Stadium: Windsor Park; Attendance: 6,625; Referee: Attila Hanacsek (Hungary)

6 October 2002 FIFA World Cup Group 3 Qualifier	Malta	0–1	Northern Ireland	Ta' Qali, Malta
17:30 BST; Match 489		Report	Healy 57' (pen.)	Stadium: Ta' Qali National Stadium; Attendance: 1,778; Referee: Manfred Schüttengruber (Austria)

=== 2002 ===
13 February International Friendly	Poland	4–1	Northern Ireland	Limassol, Cyprus
20:45 GMT; Match 490	Kryszałowicz 6', 66'; Kałużny 11'; Żewłakow 69'	Report	Lomas 17'	Stadium: Tsirio Stadium; Attendance: 221; Referee: Tasos Papaioannou (Cyprus)

27 March International Friendly	Liechtenstein	0–0	Northern Ireland	Vaduz, Liechtenstein
19:30 GMT; Match 491		Report		Stadium: Rheinpark; Attendance: 1,080; Referee: René Rogalla (Switzerland)

17 April International Friendly	Northern Ireland	0–5	Spain	Belfast, Northern Ireland
20:00 BST; Match 492		Report	Raúl 24', 53'; Baraja 48'; Puyol 68'; Morientes 77'	Stadium: Windsor Park; Attendance: 13,000; Referee: Kenny Clark (Scotland)

21 August International Friendly	Northern Ireland	0–0	Cyprus	Belfast, Northern Ireland
20:00 BST; Match 493		Report		Stadium: Windsor Park; Attendance: 6,922; Referee: Simon Jones (Wales)

12 October UEFA Euro 2004 Group 6 Qualifier	Spain	3–0	Northern Ireland	Albacete, Spain
20:45 BST; Match 494	Baraja 19', 89'; Guti 59'	Report		Stadium: Estadio Carlos Belmonte; Attendance: 16,000; Referee: Ľuboš Micheľ (Slovakia)

16 October UEFA Euro 2004 Group 6 Qualifier	Northern Ireland	0–0	Ukraine	Belfast, Northern Ireland
20:00 BST; Match 495		Report		Stadium: Windsor Park; Attendance: 9,288; Referee: Cosimo Bolognino (Italy)

=== 2003 ===
12 February International Friendly	Northern Ireland	0–1	Finland	Belfast, Northern Ireland
20:00 GMT; Match 496		Report	Hyypiä 50'	Stadium: Windsor Park; Attendance: 6,137; Referee: Dougie McDonald (Scotland)

29 March UEFA Euro 2004 Group 6 Qualifier	Armenia	1–0	Northern Ireland	Yerevan, Armenia
14:00 GMT; Match 497	Petrosyan 86'	Report		Stadium: Vazgen Sargsyan Republican Stadium; Attendance: 10,321; Referee: Roland Beck (Liechtenstein)

2 April UEFA Euro 2004 Group 6 Qualifier	Northern Ireland	0–2	Greece	Belfast, Northern Ireland
20:00 BST; Match 498		Report	Charisteas 4', 55'	Stadium: Windsor Park; Attendance: 7,187; Referee: Grzegorz Gilewski (Poland)

3 June International Friendly	Italy	2–0	Northern Ireland	Campobasso, Italy
20:00 BST; Match 499	Corradi 31'; Delvecchio 67'	Report		Stadium: Stadio Nuovo Romagnoli; Attendance: 18,270; Referee: Lucílio Batista (Portugal)

11 June UEFA Euro 2004 Group 6 Qualifier	Northern Ireland	0–0	Spain	Belfast, Northern Ireland
20:00 BST; Match 500		Report		Stadium: Windsor Park; Attendance: 11,365; Referee: Claus Bo Larsen (Denmark)

6 September UEFA Euro 2004 Group 6 Qualifier	Ukraine	0–0	Northern Ireland	Donetsk, Ukraine
17:15 BST; Match 501		Report		Stadium: Shakhtar Stadium; Attendance: 25,000; Referee: Wolfgang Stark (Germany)

10 September UEFA Euro 2004 Group 6 Qualifier	Northern Ireland	0–1	Armenia	Belfast, Northern Ireland
20:00 BST; Match 502		Report	Karamyan 27'	Stadium: Windsor Park; Attendance: 8,616; Referee: Anton Stredak (Slovakia)

11 October UEFA Euro 2004 Group 6 Qualifier	Greece	1–0	Northern Ireland	Athens, Greece
17:00 BST; Match 503	Tsiartas 69' (pen.)	Report		Stadium: Leoforos Alexandras Stadium; Attendance: 15,500; Referee: Urs Meier (Switzerland)

=== 2004 ===
18 February International Friendly	Northern Ireland	1–4	Norway	Belfast, Northern Ireland
19:45 GMT; Match 504	Healy 57'	Report	Pedersen 17', 35'; Iversen 44'; Gillespie 58' (o.g.)	Stadium: Windsor Park; Attendance: 11,288; Referee: Craig Thomson (Scotland)

31 March International Friendly	Estonia	0–1	Northern Ireland	Tallinn, Estonia
16:00 BST; Match 505		Report	Healy 45+3'	Stadium: A. Le Coq Arena; Attendance: 2,900; Referee: Petteri Kari (Finland)

28 April International Friendly	Northern Ireland	1–1	Serbia and Montenegro	Belfast, Northern Ireland
19:45 BST; Match 506	Quinn 18'	Report	Paunović 7'	Stadium: Windsor Park; Attendance: 9,690; Referee: Ceri Richards (Wales)

30 May International Friendly	Barbados	1–1	Northern Ireland	Saint Michael, Barbados
BST; Match 507	Skinner 38'	Report	Healy 71'	Stadium: Barbados National Stadium; Attendance: 8,000; Referee: Neil Brizan (Trinidad and Tobago)

2 June International Friendly	Saint Kitts and Nevis	0–2	Northern Ireland	Basseterre, Saint Kitts and Nevis
BST; Match 508		Report	Healy 81'; Jones 86'	Stadium: Warner Park Sporting Complex; Attendance: 5,000; Referee: James Matthew (St. Kitts and Nevis)

6 June International Friendly	Trinidad and Tobago	0–3	Northern Ireland	Scarborough, Trinidad and Tobago
BST; Match 509		Report	Healy 5', 66'; Elliott 41'	Stadium: Dwight Yorke Stadium; Attendance: 7,500; Referee: Barney Callender (Barbados)

18 August International Friendly	Switzerland	0–0	Northern Ireland	Zürich, Switzerland
19:15 BST; Match 510		Report		Stadium: Hardturm; Attendance: 4,000; Referee: Nicolai Vollquartz (Denmark)

4 September 2006 FIFA World Cup Group 6 Qualifier	Northern Ireland	0–3	Poland	Belfast, Northern Ireland
15:00 BST; Match 511		Report	Żurawski 4'; Włodarczyk 36'; Krzynówek 56'	Stadium: Windsor Park; Attendance: 12,487; Referee: Jan Wegereef (Netherlands)

8 September 2006 FIFA World Cup Group 6 Qualifier	Wales	2–2	Northern Ireland	Cardiff, Wales
20;00 BST; Match 512	Hartson 32'; Earnshaw 74'	Report	Whitley 10'; Healy 21'	Stadium: Millennium Stadium; Attendance: 63,500; Referee: Domenico Messina (Italy)

9 October 2006 FIFA World Cup Group 6 Qualifier	Azerbaijan	0–0	Northern Ireland	Baku, Azerbaijan
17:30 BST; Match 513		Report		Stadium: Tofiq Bahramov Republican Stadium; Attendance: 6,460; Referee: Attila Hanacsek (Hungary)

13 October 2006 FIFA World Cup Group 6 Qualifier	Northern Ireland	3–3	Austria	Belfast, Northern Ireland
19:45 BST; Match 514	Healy 36'; Murdock 58'; Elliott 90+4'	Report	Schopp 14', 72'; Mayrleb 59'	Stadium: Windsor Park; Attendance: 11,810; Referee: Mark Shield (Australia)

=== 2005 ===
9 February International Friendly	Northern Ireland	0–1	Canada	Belfast, Northern Ireland
20:00 GMT; Match 515		Report	Occéan 32'	Stadium: Windsor Park; Attendance: 11,156; Referee: Joseph Attard (Malta)

26 March 2006 FIFA World Cup Group 6 Qualifier	England	4–0	Northern Ireland	Manchester, England
15:00 GMT; Match 516	J. Cole 47'; Owen 52', 54'; Lampard 62'	Report		Stadium: Old Trafford; Attendance: 62,239; Referee: Wolfgang Stark (Germany)

30 March 2006 FIFA World Cup Group 6 Qualifier	Poland	1–0	Northern Ireland	Warsaw, Poland
19:00 BST; Match 517	Żurawski 87'	Report		Stadium: Polish Army Stadium; Attendance: 13,515; Referee: Peter Fröjdfeldt (Sweden)

4 June International Friendly	Northern Ireland	1–4	Germany	Belfast, Northern Ireland
19:30 BST; Match 518	Healy 15' (pen.)	Report	Asamoah 17'; Ballack 62', 66' (pen.); Podolski 81'	Stadium: Windsor Park; Attendance: 14,800; Referee: Charlie Richmond (Scotland)

17 August International Friendly	Malta	1–1	Northern Ireland	Ta' Qali, Malta
19:00 BST; Match 519	Woods 36'	Report	Healy 9'	Stadium: Ta' Qali National Stadium; Attendance: 1,850; Referee: Mike Riley (England)

3 September 2006 FIFA World Cup Group 6 Qualifier	Northern Ireland	2–0	Azerbaijan	Belfast, Northern Ireland
15:00 BST; Match 520	Elliott 60'; Feeney 84' (pen.)	Report		Stadium: Windsor Park; Attendance: 12,000; Referee: Dejan Stanišić (Serbia and Montenegro)

7 September 2006 FIFA World Cup Group 6 Qualifier	Northern Ireland	1–0	England	Belfast, Northern Ireland
19:45 BST; Match 521	Healy 74'	Report		Stadium: Windsor Park; Attendance: 14,069; Referee: Massimo Busacca (Switzerland)

8 October 2006 FIFA World Cup Group 6 Qualifier	Northern Ireland	2–3	Wales	Belfast, Northern Ireland
14:00 BST; Match 522	Gillespie 47'; Davis 50'	Report	Davies 27'; Robinson 37'; Giggs 81'	Stadium: Windsor Park; Attendance: 13,451; Referee: Ruud Bossen (Netherlands)

12 October 2006 FIFA World Cup Group 6 Qualifier	Austria	2–0	Northern Ireland	Vienna, Austria
19:30 BST; Match 523	Aufhauser 44', 90'	Report		Stadium: Ernst-Happel-Stadion; Attendance: 12,500; Referee: Athanassios Briakos (Greece)

15 November International Friendly	Northern Ireland	1–1	Portugal	Belfast, Northern Ireland
20:00 GMT; Match 524	Feeney 52'	Report	Craigan 40' (o.g.)	Stadium: Windsor Park; Attendance: 20,000; Referee: Howard Webb (England)

=== 2006 ===
1 March International Friendly	Northern Ireland	1–0	Estonia	Belfast, Northern Ireland
20:00 GMT; Match 525	Sproule 2'	Report		Stadium: Windsor Park; Attendance: 13,600; Referee: Pieter Vink (Netherlands)

21 May International Friendly	Uruguay	1–0	Northern Ireland	East Rutherford, United States
19:00 BST; Match 526	Estoyanoff 33'	Report		Stadium: Giants Stadium; Attendance: 4,152; Referee: Alex Prus (United States)

26 May International Friendly	Romania	2–0	Northern Ireland	Chicago, United States
22:05 BST; Match 527	Buga 7'; Niculae 11'	Report		Stadium: Soldier Field; Attendance: 15,000; Referee: Michael Kennedy (United States)

16 August International Friendly	Finland	1–2	Northern Ireland	Helsinki, Finland
17:00 BST; Match 528	Väyrynen 74'	Report	Healy 34'; Lafferty 64'	Stadium: Helsinki Olympic Stadium; Attendance: 12,456; Referee: Michael Svendsen (Denmark)

2 September UEFA Euro 2008 Group F Qualifier	Northern Ireland	0–3	Iceland	Belfast, Northern Ireland
15:00 BST; Match 529		Report	Þorvaldsson 13'; Hreiðarsson 20'; Guðjohnsen 37'	Stadium: Windsor Park; Attendance: 13,522; Referee: Tommy Skjerven (Norway)

6 September UEFA Euro 2008 Group F Qualifier	Northern Ireland	3–2	Spain	Belfast, Northern Ireland
20:15 BST; Match 530	Healy 20', 65', 80'	Report	Xavi 14'; Villa 52'	Stadium: Windsor Park; Attendance: 13,885; Referee: Frank De Bleeckere (Belgium)

7 October UEFA Euro 2008 Group F Qualifier	Denmark	0–0	Northern Ireland	Copenhagen, Denmark
19:00 BST; Match 531		Report		Stadium: Parken Stadium; Attendance: 41,482; Referee: Konrad Plautz (Austria)

11 October UEFA Euro 2008 Group F Qualifier	Northern Ireland	1–0	Latvia	Belfast, Northern Ireland
20:00 BST; Match 532	Healy 35'	Report		Stadium: Windsor Park; Attendance: 13,500; Referee: Helmut Fleischer (Germany)

=== 2007 ===
5 February International Friendly	Northern Ireland	0–0	Wales	Belfast, Northern Ireland
19:45 GMT; Match 533		Report		Stadium: Windsor Park; Attendance: 8,753; Referee: Charlie Richmond (Scotland)

24 March UEFA Euro 2008 Group F Qualifier	Liechtenstein	1–4	Northern Ireland	Vaduz, Liechtenstein
19:15 GMT; Match 534	Burgmeier 90+1'	Report	Healy 52', 75', 83'; McCann 90+2'	Stadium: Rheinpark; Attendance: 4,340; Referee: Oleh Oriekhov (Ukraine)

28 March UEFA Euro 2008 Group F Qualifier	Northern Ireland	2–1	Sweden	Belfast, Northern Ireland
19:45 BST; Match 535	Healy 31', 58'	Report	Elmander 26'	Stadium: Windsor Park; Attendance: 13,500; Referee: Eric Braamhaar (Netherlands)

22 August UEFA Euro 2008 Group F Qualifier	Northern Ireland	3–1	Liechtenstein	Belfast, Northern Ireland
19:45 BST; Match 536	Healy 5', 35'; Lafferty 56'	Report	M. Frick 89'	Stadium: Windsor Park; Attendance: 13,544; Referee: Radek Matějek (Czech Republic)

8 September UEFA Euro 2008 Group F Qualifier	Latvia	1–0	Northern Ireland	Riga, Latvia
17:15 BST; Match 537	Baird 56' (o.g.)	Report		Stadium: Skonto Stadium; Attendance: 7,500; Referee: Pedro Proença (Portugal)

12 September UEFA Euro 2008 Group F Qualifier	Iceland	2–1	Northern Ireland	Reykjavík, Iceland
19:05 BST; Match 538	Björnsson 6'; Gillespie 90+1' (o.g.)	Report	Healy 72' (pen.)	Stadium: Laugardalsvöllur; Attendance: 7,727; Referee: Yuri Baskakov (Russia)

17 October UEFA Euro 2008 Group F Qualifier	Sweden	1–1	Northern Ireland	Solna, Sweden
19:30 BST; Match 539	Mellberg 15'	Report	Lafferty 72'	Stadium: Råsunda Stadion; Attendance: 33,112; Referee: Bertrand Layec (France)

17 November UEFA Euro 2008 Group F Qualifier	Northern Ireland	2–1	Denmark	Belfast, Northern Ireland
19:45 GMT; Match 540	Feeney 62'; Healy 80'	Report	Bendtner 51'	Stadium: Windsor Park; Attendance: 12,997; Referee: Pieter Vink (Netherlands)

21 November UEFA Euro 2008 Group F Qualifier	Spain	1–0	Northern Ireland	Las Palmas, Spain
19:00 GMT; Match 541	Xavi 52'	Report		Stadium: Estadio Gran Canaria; Attendance: 30,339; Referee: Herbert Fandel (Germany)

=== 2008 ===
6 February International Friendly	Northern Ireland	0–1	Bulgaria	Belfast, Northern Ireland
19:45 GMT; Match 542		Report	Evans 38' (o.g.)	Stadium: Windsor Park; Attendance: 12,648; Referee: Dougie McDonald (Scotland)

26 March International Friendly	Northern Ireland	4–1	Georgia	Belfast, Northern Ireland
19:45 GMT; Match 543	Lafferty 25', 36'; Healy 33'; Thompson 87'	Report	Healy 55' (o.g.)	Stadium: Windsor Park; Attendance: 12,333; Referee: Luc Wilmes (Luxembourg)

20 August International Friendly	Scotland	0–0	Northern Ireland	Glasgow, Scotland
20:00 BST; Match 544		Report		Stadium: Hampden Park; Attendance: 28,072; Referee: Nicolai Vollquartz (Denmark)

6 September 2010 FIFA World Cup Group 3 Qualifier	Slovakia	2–1	Northern Ireland	Bratislava, Slovakia
16:30 BST; Match 545	Škrtel 46'; Hamšík 70'	Report	Ďurica 81' (o.g.)	Stadium: Tehelné pole Attendance: 5,445; Referee: Nikolai Ivanov (Russia)

10 September 2010 FIFA World Cup Group 3 Qualifier	Northern Ireland	0–0	Czech Republic	Belfast, Northern Ireland
19:45 BST; Match 546		Report		Stadium: Windsor Park; Attendance: 12,882; Referee: Ivan Bebek (Croatia)

11 October 2010 FIFA World Cup Group 3 Qualifier	Slovenia	2–0	Northern Ireland	Maribor, Slovenia
19:45 BST; Match 547	Novaković 84'; Ljubijankić 85'	Report		Stadium: Ljudski vrt Attendance: 12,385; Referee: Eduardo Iturralde González (Spain)

15 October 2010 FIFA World Cup Group 3 Qualifier	Northern Ireland	4–0	San Marino	Belfast, Northern Ireland
19:45 BST; Match 548	Healy 30'; McCann 43'; Lafferty 56'; Davis 75'	Report		Stadium: Windsor Park; Attendance: 12,957; Referee: Petteri Kari (Finland)

19 November International Friendly	Northern Ireland	0–2	Hungary	Belfast, Northern Ireland
19:45 GMT; Match 549		Report	Torghelle 57'; Gera 71'	Stadium: Windsor Park; Attendance: 9,908; Referee: Robert Schörgenhofer (Austria)

=== 2009 ===
11 February 2010 FIFA World Cup Group 3 Qualifier	San Marino	0–3	Northern Ireland	Serravalle, San Marino
19:30 GMT; Match 550		Report	McAuley 7'; McCann 33'; Brunt 63'	Stadium: Stadio Olimpico; Attendance: 1,942; Referee: Dragomir Stanković (Serbia)

28 March 2010 FIFA World Cup Group 3 Qualifier	Northern Ireland	3–2	Poland	Belfast, Northern Ireland
17:15 GMT; Match 551	Feeney 10'; Evans 47'; Żewłakow 61' (o.g.)	Report	Jeleń 27'; Saganowski 90+1'	Stadium: Windsor Park; Attendance: 13,357; Referee: Martin Hansson (Sweden)

1 April 2010 FIFA World Cup Group 3 Qualifier	Northern Ireland	1–0	Slovenia	Belfast, Northern Ireland
19:45 BST; Match 552	Feeney 73'	Report		Stadium: Windsor Park; Attendance: 13,243; Referee: Alon Yefet (Israel)

6 June International Friendly	Italy	3–0	Northern Ireland	Pisa, Italy
19:50 BST; Match 553	Rossi 20'; Foggia 53'; Pellissier 73'	Report		Stadium: Arena Garibaldi; Attendance: 8,000; Referee: Kevin Blom (Netherlands)

12 August International Friendly	Northern Ireland	1–1	Israel	Belfast, Northern Ireland
19:45 BST; Match 554	McCann 18'	Report	Barda 26'	Stadium: Windsor Park; Attendance: 10,250; Referee: Johannes Valgeirsson (Iceland)

5 September 2010 FIFA World Cup Group 3 Qualifier	Poland	1–1	Northern Ireland	Chorzów, Poland
19:30 BST; Match 555	M. Lewandowski 80'	Report	Lafferty 38'	Stadium: Stadion Śląski; Attendance: 38,914; Referee: Manuel Mejuto González (Spain)

9 September 2010 FIFA World Cup Group 3 Qualifier	Northern Ireland	0–2	Slovakia	Belfast, Northern Ireland
19:45 BST; Match 556		Report	Šesták 15'; Hološko 67'	Stadium: Windsor Park; Attendance: 13,019; Referee: Björn Kuipers (Netherlands)

14 October 2010 FIFA World Cup Group 3 Qualifier	Czech Republic	0–0	Northern Ireland	Prague, Czech Republic
19:30 BST; Match 557		Report		Stadium: Synot Tip Arena; Attendance: 8,002; Referee: Laurent Duhamel (France)

14 November International Friendly	Northern Ireland	0–1	Serbia	Belfast, Northern Ireland
17:30 GMT; Match 558		Report	Lazović 57'	Stadium: Windsor Park; Attendance: 7,963; Referee: Albert Toussaint (Luxembourg)

== 2010s ==
=== 2010 ===
3 March International Friendly	Albania	1–0	Northern Ireland	Tirana, Albania
19:45 GMT; Match 559	Skela 21'	Report		Stadium: Qemal Stafa Stadium; Attendance: 7,500; Referee: Elmir Pilav (Bosnia and Herzegovina)

26 May International Friendly	Northern Ireland	0–2	Turkey	New Britain, United States
18:30 BST; Match 560		Report	Yıldırım 48'; Şentürk 72'	Stadium: Veterans Stadium; Attendance: 4,000; Referee: Terry Vaughn (United States)

30 May International Friendly	Chile	1–0	Northern Ireland	Chillán, Chile
20:15 BST; Match 561	Paredes 30'	Report		Stadium: Estadio Municipal Nelson Oyarzún Arenas; Attendance: 12,000; Referee: Líber Prudente (Uruguay)

11 August International Friendly	Montenegro	2–0	Northern Ireland	Podgorica, Montenegro
19:30 BST; Match 562	Đalović 43', 58'	Report		Stadium: Stadion Pod Goricom; Attendance: 5,000; Referee: Boško Jovanetić (Serbia)

3 September UEFA Euro 2012 Group C Qualifier	Slovenia	0–1	Northern Ireland	Maribor, Slovenia
19:45 BST; Match 563		Report	C. Evans 70'	Stadium: Ljudski vrt Attendance: 12,000; Referee: Cristian Balaj (Romania)

8 October UEFA Euro 2012 Group C Qualifier	Northern Ireland	0–0	Italy	Belfast, Northern Ireland
19:45 BST; Match 564		Report		Stadium: Windsor Park; Attendance: 15,200; Referee: Tony Chapron (France)

12 October UEFA Euro 2012 Group C Qualifier	Faroe Islands	1–1	Northern Ireland	Toftir, Faroe Islands
16:00 BST; Match 565	Holst 60'	Report	Lafferty 76'	Stadium: Svangaskarð; Attendance: 1,921; Referee: Cyril Zimmermann (Switzerland)

17 November International Friendly	Northern Ireland	1–1	Morocco	Belfast, Northern Ireland
19:45 GMT; Match 566	Patterson 86' (pen.)	Report	Chamakh 55'	Stadium: Windsor Park; Attendance: 15,000; Referee: Terje Hauge (Norway)

=== 2011 ===
9 February 2011 Nations Cup	Northern Ireland	0–3	Scotland	Dublin, Republic of Ireland
19:45 GMT; Match 567		Report	Miller 19'; McArthur 31'; Commons 51'	Stadium: Aviva Stadium; Attendance: 18,742; Referee: Tomas Connolly (Republic of Ireland)

25 March UEFA Euro 2012 Group C Qualifier	Serbia	2–1	Northern Ireland	Belgrade, Serbia
19:30 GMT; Match 568	Pantelić 65'; Tošić 74'	Report	McAuley 40'	Stadium: Stadion Crvena Zvezda; Attendance: 350 (Note: As punishment for the crowd trouble at the abandoned Italy v Serbia match, Serbia was ordered to play its next home match against Northern Ireland behind closed doors, with another one-match crowd ban deferred for a probationary period of two years. Italy received a one-match crowd ban deferred for a probationary period of two years. However the Irish Football Association objected and as a result UEFA decreed that Serbia's game against Northern Ireland would only be allowed to have 200 Northern Irish fans attend it. Serbian fans were not allowed to visit the away game against Estonia.); Referee: Serge Gumienny (Belgium)

29 March UEFA Euro 2012 Group C Qualifier	Northern Ireland	0–0	Slovenia	Belfast, Northern Ireland
19:45 BST; Match 569		Report		Stadium: Windsor Park; Attendance: 14,200; Referee: Björn Kuipers (Netherlands)

24 May 2011 Nations Cup	Republic of Ireland	5–0	Northern Ireland	Dublin, Republic of Ireland
19:45 BST; Match 570	Ward 24'; Keane 37', 54' (pen.); Cathcart 45' (o.g.); Cox 80'	Report		Stadium: Aviva Stadium; Attendance: 15,083; Referee: Craig Thomson (Scotland)

27 May 2011 Nations Cup	Wales	2–0	Northern Ireland	Dublin, Republic of Ireland
19:45 BST; Match 571	Ramsey 36'; Earnshaw 69'	Report		Stadium: Aviva Stadium; Attendance: 529; Referee: Alan Kelly (Republic of Ireland)

10 August UEFA Euro 2012 Group C Qualifier	Northern Ireland	4–0	Faroe Islands	Belfast, Northern Ireland
19:45 BST; Match 572	Hughes 5'; Davis 66'; McCourt 71', 87'	Report		Stadium: Windsor Park; Attendance: 13,183; Referee: Emir Alecković (Bosnia and Herzegovina)

2 September UEFA Euro 2012 Group C Qualifier	Northern Ireland	0–1	Serbia	Belfast, Northern Ireland
19:45 BST; Match 573		Report	Pantelić 67'	Stadium: Windsor Park; Attendance: 15,148; Referee: Thomas Einwaller (Austria)

6 September UEFA Euro 2012 Group C Qualifier	Estonia	4–1	Northern Ireland	Tallinn, Estonia
19:30 BST; Match 574	Vunk 28'; Kink 32'; Zenjov 59'; Saag 90+3'	Report	Piiroja 40' (o.g.)	Stadium: A. Le Coq Arena; Attendance: 8,660; Referee: Daniel Stålhammar (Sweden)

7 October UEFA Euro 2012 Group C Qualifier	Northern Ireland	1–2	Estonia	Belfast, Northern Ireland
19:45 BST; Match 575	Davis 22'	Report	Vassiljev 77' (pen.), 84'	Stadium: Windsor Park; Attendance: 12,604; Referee: Manuel Gräfe (Germany)

11 October UEFA Euro 2012 Group C Qualifier	Italy	3–0	Northern Ireland	Pescara, Italy
19:45 BST; Match 576	Cassano 21', 53'; McAuley 74' (o.g.)	Report		Stadium: Stadio Adriatico; Attendance: 19,480; Referee: Antonio Mateu Lahoz (Spain)

=== 2012 ===
29 February International Friendly	Northern Ireland	0–3	Norway	Belfast, Northern Ireland
19:45 GMT; Match 577		Report	Nordtveit 44'; Elyounoussi 88'; Ruud 90+2'	Stadium: Windsor Park; Attendance: 9,759; Referee: Huw Jones (Wales)

2 June International Friendly	Netherlands	6–0	Northern Ireland	Amsterdam, Netherlands
19:00 BST; Match 578	van Persie 11', 29' (pen.); Sneijder 15'; Afellay 37', 51'; Vlaar 78'	Report		Stadium: Johan Cruyff Arena; Attendance: 50,000; Referee: Robert Schörgenhofer (Austria)

15 August International Friendly	Northern Ireland	3–3	Finland	Belfast, Northern Ireland
19:45 BST; Match 579	Ferguson 7'; Lafferty 19'; Paterson 84' (pen.)	Report	Sparv 22'; Pukki 24'; Hetemaj 78'	Stadium: Windsor Park; Attendance: 9,575; Referee: Richard Liesveld (Netherlands)

7 September 2014 FIFA World Cup Group F Qualifier	Russia	2–0	Northern Ireland	Moscow, Russia
16:00 BST; Match 580	Fayzulin 30'; Shirokov 78' (pen.)	Report		Stadium: Lokomotiv Stadium; Attendance: 14,300; Referee: Antonio Mateu Lahoz (Spain)

11 September 2014 FIFA World Cup Group F Qualifier	Northern Ireland	1–1	Luxembourg	Belfast, Northern Ireland
19:45 BST; Match 581	Shiels 14'	Report	da Mota 86'	Stadium: Windsor Park; Attendance: 10,674; Referee: Vlado Glodjović (Serbia)

16 October 2014 FIFA World Cup Group F Qualifier	Portugal	1–1	Northern Ireland	Porto, Portugal
19:45 BST; Match 582	Postiga 79'	Report	McGinn 30'	Stadium: Estádio do Dragão; Attendance: 48,711; Referee: Thorsten Kinhöfer (Germany)

14 November 2014 FIFA World Cup Group F Qualifier	Northern Ireland	1–1	Azerbaijan	Belfast, Northern Ireland
19:45 GMT; Match 583	Healy 90+6'	Report	Aliyev 5'	Stadium: Windsor Park; Attendance: 12,372; Referee: Viktor Shvetsov (Ukraine)

=== 2013 ===
6 February International Friendly	Malta	0–0	Northern Ireland	Ta' Qali, Malta
18:30 GMT; Match 584		Report		Stadium: Ta' Qali National Stadium; Attendance: 1,000; Referee: Nikolay Yordanov (Bulgaria)

26 March 2014 FIFA World Cup Group F Qualifier	Northern Ireland	0–2	Israel	Belfast, Northern Ireland
19:45 GMT; Match 585		Report	Refaelov 77'; Ben Basat 84'	Stadium: Windsor Park; Attendance: 11,200; Referee: Hannes Kaasik (Estonia)

14 August 2014 FIFA World Cup Group F Qualifier	Northern Ireland	1–0	Russia	Belfast, Northern Ireland
19:45 BST; Match 586	Paterson 43'	Report		Stadium: Windsor Park; Attendance: 11,178; Referee: Tom Harald Hagen (Norway)

6 September 2014 FIFA World Cup Group F Qualifier	Northern Ireland	2–4	Portugal	Belfast, Northern Ireland
19:45 BST; Match 587	McAuley 36'; Ward 52'	Report	Alves 21'; Ronaldo 68', 77', 83'	Stadium: Windsor Park; Attendance: 13,629; Referee: Danny Makkelie (Netherlands)

10 September 2014 FIFA World Cup Group F Qualifier	Luxembourg	3–2	Northern Ireland	Luxembourg City, Luxembourg
19:15 BST; Match 588	Joachim 45+1'; Bensi 78'; Jänisch 87'	Report	Paterson 14'; McAuley 82'	Stadium: Stade Josy Barthel; Attendance: 4,114; Referee: Robert Malek (Poland)

11 October 2014 FIFA World Cup Group F Qualifier	Azerbaijan	2–0	Northern Ireland	Baku, Azerbaijan
17:00 BST; Match 589	Dadashov 58'; Shukurov 90+4'	Report		Stadium: Eighth Kilometer District Stadium; Attendance: 10,100; Referee: Andrea De Marco (Italy)

15 October 2014 FIFA World Cup Group F Qualifier	Israel	1–1	Northern Ireland	Ramat Gan, Israel
18:00 BST; Match 590	Ben Basat 43'	Report	Davis 72'	Stadium: Ramat Gan Stadium; Attendance: 12,785; Referee: Laurent Duhamel (France)

15 November International Friendly	Turkey	1–0	Northern Ireland	Istanbul, Turkey
19:00 GMT; Match 591	Erdinç 45+1'	Report		Stadium: Başakşehir Fatih Terim Stadium; Attendance: 14,000; Referee: Bas Nijhuis (Netherlands)

=== 2014 ===
5 March International Friendly	Cyprus	0–0	Northern Ireland	Strovolos, Cyprus
18:00 GMT; Match 592		Report		Stadium: GSP Stadium; Attendance: 3,000; Referee: Liran Liany (Israel)

31 May International Friendly	Uruguay	1–0	Northern Ireland	Montevideo, Uruguay
00:30 BST; Match 593	Cristhian Stuani 62'	Report		Stadium: Estadio Centenario; Attendance: 45,000; Referee: Leandro Vuaden (Brazil)

5 June International Friendly	Chile	2–0	Northern Ireland	Valparaíso, Chile
01:00 BST; Match 594	Eduardo Vargas 79'; Mauricio Pinilla 82'	Report		Stadium: Estadio Elías Figueroa Brander; Attendance: 20,000; Referee: Carlos Amarilla (Uruguay)

7 September UEFA Euro 2016 Group F Qualifier	Hungary	1–2	Northern Ireland	Budapest, Hungary
17:00 BST; Match 595	Priskin 75'	Report	McGinn 81'; Lafferty 88'	Stadium: Groupama Arena; Attendance: 20,672; Referee: Deniz Aytekin (Germany)

11 October UEFA Euro 2016 Group F Qualifier	Northern Ireland	2–0	Faroe Islands	Belfast, Northern Ireland
19:45 BST; Match 596	McAuley 6'; Lafferty 20'	Report		Stadium: Windsor Park; Attendance: 10,049 (Note: The capacity at Windsor Park was limited to 10,049 for this game due to ongoing redevelopment work on the stadium.); Referee: Alon Yefet (Israel)

14 October UEFA Euro 2016 Group F Qualifier	Greece	0–2	Northern Ireland	Piraeus, Greece
19:45 BST; Match 597		Report	Ward 9'; Lafferty 51'	Stadium: Karaiskakis Stadium; Attendance: 18,726; Referee: Stéphane Lannoy (France)

14 November UEFA Euro 2016 Group F Qualifier	Romania	2–0	Northern Ireland	Bucharest, Romania
19:45 GMT; Match 598	Papp 74', 79'	Report		Stadium: Arena Națională; Attendance: 28,892; Referee: Jonas Eriksson (Sweden)

=== 2015 ===
25 March International Friendly	Scotland	1–0	Northern Ireland	Glasgow, Scotland
19:45 GMT; Match 599	Berra 86'	Report		Stadium: Hampden Park; Attendance: 20,117; Referee: Martin Atkinson (England)

29 March UEFA Euro 2016 Group F Qualifier	Northern Ireland	2–1	Finland	Belfast, Northern Ireland
17:00 BST; Match 600	Lafferty 33', 38'	Report	Sadik 90+1'	Stadium: Windsor Park; Attendance: 10,264 (Note: The capacity at Windsor Park was limited to 10,264 for this game due to ongoing redevelopment work on the stadium.); Referee: Szymon Marciniak (Poland)

31 May International Friendly	Northern Ireland	1–1	Qatar	Crewe, England
17:00 BST; Match 601	Dallas 70'	Report	Boudiaf 46'	Stadium: Gresty Road; Attendance: 3,022; Referee: Michael Oliver (England)

13 June UEFA Euro 2016 Group F Qualifier	Northern Ireland	0–0	Romania	Belfast, Northern Ireland
19:45 BST; Match 602		Report		Stadium: Windsor Park; Attendance: 10,000 (Note: The capacity at Windsor Park was limited to 10,000 for this game due to ongoing redevelopment work on the stadium.); Referee: Carlos Velasco Carballo (Spain)

4 September UEFA Euro 2016 Group F Qualifier	Faroe Islands	1–3	Northern Ireland	Tórshavn, Faroe Islands
19:45 BST; Match 603	Edmundsson 36'	Report	McAuley 12', 71'; K. Lafferty 75'	Stadium: Tórsvøllur; Attendance: 4,513; Referee: Felix Zwayer (Germany)

7 September UEFA Euro 2016 Group F Qualifier	Northern Ireland	1–1	Hungary	Belfast, Northern Ireland
19:45 BST; Match 604	Lafferty 90+3'	Report	Guzmics 74'	Stadium: Windsor Park; Attendance: 10,200 (Note: The capacity at Windsor Park was limited to 10,200 for this game due to ongoing redevelopment work on the stadium.); Referee: Cüneyt Çakır (Turkey)

8 October UEFA Euro 2016 Group F Qualifier	Northern Ireland	3–1	Greece	Belfast, Northern Ireland
19:45 BST; Match 605	Davis 35', 58'; Magennis 49'	Report	Aravidis 87'	Stadium: Windsor Park; Attendance: 11,700 (Note: The capacity at Windsor Park was limited to 11,700 for this game due to ongoing redevelopment work on the stadium.); Referee: Bas Nijhuis (Netherlands)

11 October UEFA Euro 2016 Group F Qualifier	Finland	1–1	Northern Ireland	Helsinki, Finland
17:00 BST; Match 606	Arajuuri 87'	Report	Cathcart 31'	Stadium: Olympiastadion; Attendance: 14,550; Referee: Sergei Karasev (Russia)

13 November International Friendly	Northern Ireland	1–0	Latvia	Belfast, Northern Ireland
19:45 GMT; Match 607	Davis 55'	Report		Stadium: Windsor Park; Attendance: 11,707 (Note: The capacity at Windsor Park was limited to 11,707 for this game due to ongoing redevelopment work on the stadium.); Referee: Mohammed Al-Hoaish (Saudi Arabia)

=== 2016 ===
24 March International Friendly	Wales	1–1	Northern Ireland	Cardiff, Wales
19:45 GMT; Match 608	Church 89' (pen.)	Report	Cathcart 60'	Stadium: Cardiff City Stadium; Attendance: 21,855; Referee: Steven McLean (Scotland)

28 March International Friendly	Northern Ireland	1–0	Slovenia	Belfast, Northern Ireland
19:45 BST; Match 609	Washington 41'	Report		Stadium: Windsor Park; Attendance: 13,500 (Note: The capacity at Windsor Park was limited to 13,500 for this game due to ongoing redevelopment work on the stadium.); Referee: Kristo Tohver (Estonia)

27 May International Friendly	Northern Ireland	3–0	Belarus	Belfast, Northern Ireland
19:45 BST; Match 610	Lafferty 6'; Washington 44'; Grigg 88'	Report		Stadium: Windsor Park; Attendance: 14,229 (Note: The capacity at Windsor Park was limited to 14,229 for this game due to ongoing redevelopment work on the stadium.); Referee: Martin Atkinson (England)

4 June International Friendly	Slovakia	0–0	Northern Ireland	Trnava, Slovakia
19:45 BST; Match 611		Report		Stadium: Štadión Antona Malatinského; Attendance: 18,111; Referee: Radu Petrescu (Romania)

12 June UEFA Euro 2016 Group C	Poland	1–0	Northern Ireland	Nice, France
18:00 BST; Match 612	Milik 51'	Report		Stadium: Stade de Nice; Attendance: 33,742; Referee: Ovidiu Hațegan (Romania)

16 June UEFA Euro 2016 Group C	Ukraine	0–2	Northern Ireland	Décines-Charpieu, France
18:00 BST; Match 613		Report	McAuley 49'; McGinn 90+6'	Stadium: Parc Olympique Lyonnais; Attendance: 51,043; Referee: Pavel Královec (Czech Republic)

21 June UEFA Euro 2016 Group C	Northern Ireland	0–1	Germany	Paris, France
18:00 BST; Match 614		Report	Gómez 30'	Stadium: Parc des Princes; Attendance: 44,125; Referee: Clément Turpin (France)

25 June UEFA Euro 2016 Round of 16	Wales	1–0	Northern Ireland	Paris, France
18:00 BST; Match 615	McAuley 75' (o.g.)	Report		Stadium: Parc des Princes; Attendance: 44,342; Referee: Martin Atkinson (England)

4 September 2018 FIFA World Cup Group 3 Qualifier	Czech Republic	0–0	Northern Ireland	Prague, Czech Republic
19:45 BST; Match 616		Report		Stadium: Generali Arena; Attendance: 10,731; Referee: Anastasios Sidiropoulos (Greece)

8 October 2018 FIFA World Cup Group 3 Qualifier	Northern Ireland	4–0	San Marino	Belfast, Northern Ireland
19:45 BST; Match 617	Davis 26' (pen.); Lafferty 79', 90+4'; Ward 85'	Report		Stadium: Windsor Park; Attendance: 18,234; Referee: István Kovács (Romania)

11 October 2018 FIFA World Cup Group 3 Qualifier	Germany	2–0	Northern Ireland	Hanover, Germany
19:45 BST; Match 618	Draxler 13'; Khedira 17'	Report		Stadium: Niedersachsenstadion; Attendance: 42,132; Referee: Paolo Tagliavento (Italy)

11 November 2018 FIFA World Cup Group 3 Qualifier	Northern Ireland	4–0	Azerbaijan	Belfast, Northern Ireland
19:45 GMT; Match 619	Lafferty 27'; McAuley 40'; C. McLaughlin 66'; Brunt 83'	Report		Stadium: Windsor Park; Attendance: 18,404; Referee: Clément Turpin (France)

15 November International Friendly	Northern Ireland	0–3	Croatia	Belfast, Northern Ireland
19:45 GMT; Match 620		Report	Mandžukić 9'; Čop 35'; Kramarić 68'	Stadium: Windsor Park; Attendance: 16,019; Referee: Mark Clattenburg (England)

=== 2017 ===
26 March 2018 FIFA World Cup Group 3 Qualifier	Northern Ireland	2–0	Norway	Belfast, Northern Ireland
19:45 BST; Match 621	Ward 2'; Washington 33'	Report		Stadium: Windsor Park; Attendance: 18,161; Referee: Hüseyin Göçek (Turkey)

2 June International Friendly	Northern Ireland	1–0	New Zealand	Belfast, Northern Ireland
19:45 BST; Match 622	Boyce 6'	Report		Stadium: Windsor Park; Attendance: 16,815; Referee: Alain Durieux (Luxembourg)

10 June 2018 FIFA World Cup Group 3 Qualifier	Azerbaijan	0–1	Northern Ireland	Baku, Azerbaijan
17:00 BST; Match 623		Report	Dallas 90+2'	Stadium: Bakcell Arena; Attendance: 27,978; Referee: Xavier Estrada Fernández (Spain)

1 September 2018 FIFA World Cup Group 3 Qualifier	San Marino	0–3	Northern Ireland	Serravalle, San Marino
19:45 BST; Match 624		Report	Magennis 70', 75'; Davis 78' (pen.)	Stadium: San Marino Stadium; Attendance: 2,544; Referee: Enea Jorgji (Albania)

4 September 2018 FIFA World Cup Group 3 Qualifier	Northern Ireland	2–0	Czech Republic	Belfast, Northern Ireland
19:45 BST; Match 625	J. Evans 28'; Brunt 41'	Report		Stadium: Windsor Park; Attendance: 18,167; Referee: Daniele Orsato (Italy)

5 October 2018 FIFA World Cup Group 3 Qualifier	Northern Ireland	1–3	Germany	Belfast, Northern Ireland
19:45 BST; Match 626	Magennis 90+3'	Report	Rudy 2'; Wagner 21'; Kimmich 86'	Stadium: Windsor Park; Attendance: 18,104; Referee: Danny Makkelie (Netherlands)

8 October 2018 FIFA World Cup Group 3 Qualifier	Norway	1–0	Northern Ireland	Oslo, Norway
19:45 BST; Match 627	Brunt 71' (o.g.)	Report		Stadium: Ullevaal Stadion; Attendance: 10,244; Referee: Serhiy Boyko (Ukraine)

9 November 2018 FIFA World Cup Qualifier Playoffs	Northern Ireland	0–1	Switzerland	Belfast, Northern Ireland
19:45 GMT; Match 628		Report	Rodríguez 58' (pen.)	Stadium: Windsor Park; Attendance: 18,269; Referee: Ovidiu Hațegan (Romania)

12 November 2018 FIFA World Cup Qualifier Playoffs	Switzerland	0–0 (1–0 agg.)	Northern Ireland	Basel, Switzerland
17:00 GMT; Match 629		Report		Stadium: St. Jakob-Park; Attendance: 36,000; Referee: Felix Brych (Germany)
Note: Switzerland won 1–0 on aggregate and qualified for the 2018 FIFA World Cup.

=== 2018 ===
24 March International Friendly	Northern Ireland	2–1	South Korea	Belfast, Northern Ireland
14:00 GMT; Match 630	Kim Min-jae 20' (o.g.); Smyth 86'	Report	Kwon Chang-hoon 7'	Stadium: Windsor Park; Attendance: 18,103; Referee: Bobby Madden (Scotland)

29 May International Friendly	Panama	0–0	Northern Ireland	Panama City, Panama
12:00 EST; Match 631		Report		Stadium: Estadio Rommel Fernández; Attendance: 26,000; Referee: Henry Bejarano (Costa Rica)

3 June International Friendly	Costa Rica	3–0	Northern Ireland	San José, Costa Rica
11:00 CST; Match 632	Venegas 30'; Campbell 46'; Calvo 66'	Report		Stadium: Estadio Nacional de Costa Rica; Attendance: 35,100; Referee: Fernando Guerrero Ramírez (Mexico)

8 September 2018–19 UEFA Nations League B	Northern Ireland	1–2	Bosnia and Herzegovina	Belfast, Northern Ireland
14:00 BST; Match 633	Grigg 90+3'	Report	Duljević 36'; Sarić 64'	Stadium: Windsor Park; Attendance: 16,942; Referee: Pavel Královec (Czech Republic)

11 September International Friendly	Northern Ireland	3–0	Israel	Belfast, Northern Ireland
19:45 BST; Match 634	Davis 13'; Dallas 41'; Whyte 67'	Report		Stadium: Windsor Park; Attendance: 12,913; Referee: Bas Nijhuis (Netherlands)

12 October 2018–19 UEFA Nations League B	Austria	1–0	Northern Ireland	Vienna, Austria
19:45 BST; Match 635	Arnautović 71'	Report		Stadium: Ernst-Happel-Stadion; Attendance: 22,300; Referee: Georgi Kabakov (Bulgaria)

15 October 2018–19 UEFA Nations League B	Bosnia and Herzegovina	2–0	Northern Ireland	Sarajevo, Bosnia and Herzegovina
19:45 BST; Match 636	Džeko 27', 73'	Report		Stadium: Stadion Grbavica; Attendance: 11,050; Referee: Mattias Gestranius (Finland)

15 November International Friendly	Republic of Ireland	0–0	Northern Ireland	Dublin, Republic of Ireland
19:45 GMT; Match 637		Report		Stadium: Aviva Stadium; Attendance: 31,241; Referee: Slavko Vinčić (Slovenia)

18 November 2018–19 UEFA Nations League B	Northern Ireland	1–2	Austria	Belfast, Northern Ireland
17:00 GMT; Match 638	C. Evans 57'	Report	Schlager 49'; Lazaro 90+3'	Stadium: Windsor Park; Attendance: 17,895; Referee: Jonathan Lardot (Belgium)

=== 2019 ===
21 March UEFA Euro 2020 Group C Qualifier	Northern Ireland	2–0	Estonia	Belfast, Northern Ireland
19:45 GMT; Match 639	McGinn 56'; Davis 75' (pen.)	Report		Stadium: Windsor Park; Attendance: 18,176; Referee: Ivan Bebek (Croatia)

24 March UEFA Euro 2020 Group C Qualifier	Northern Ireland	2–1	Belarus	Belfast, Northern Ireland
19:45 GMT; Match 640	J. Evans 30'; Magennis 87'	Report	Stasevich 33'	Stadium: Windsor Park; Attendance: 18,188; Referee: Paweł Raczkowski (Poland)

8 June UEFA Euro 2020 Group C Qualifier	Estonia	1–2	Northern Ireland	Tallinn, Estonia
17:00 BST; Match 641	Vassiljev 25'	Report	Washington 77'; Magennis 80'	Stadium: A. Le Coq Arena; Attendance: 8,378; Referee: Fabio Verissimo (Portugal)

11 June UEFA Euro 2020 Group C Qualifier	Belarus	0–1	Northern Ireland	Barysaw, Belarus
19:45 BST; Match 642		Report	McNair 86'	Stadium: Borisov Arena; Attendance: 5,250; Referee: Harald Lechner (Austria)

5 September International Friendly	Northern Ireland	1–0	Luxembourg	Belfast, Northern Ireland
19:45 BST; Match 643	Malget 37' (o.g.)	Report		Stadium: Windsor Park; Attendance: 14,108; Referee: Bryn Markham-Jones (Wales)

9 September UEFA Euro 2020 Group C Qualifier	Northern Ireland	0–2	Germany	Belfast, Northern Ireland
19:45 BST; Match 644		Report	Halstenberg 48'; Gnabry 90+2'	Stadium: Windsor Park; Attendance: 18,326; Referee: Daniele Orsato (Italy)

10 October UEFA Euro 2020 Group C Qualifier	Netherlands	3–1	Northern Ireland	Rotterdam, Netherlands
19:45 BST; Match 645	Depay 80', 90+4'; L. de Jong 90+1'	Report	Magennis 75'	Stadium: De Kuip; Attendance: 41,348; Referee: Benoît Bastien (France)

14 October International Friendly	Czech Republic	2–3	Northern Ireland	Prague, Czech Republic
19:45 BST; Match 646	Darida 67'; Král 68'	Report	McNair 9', 40'; Evans 23'	Stadium: Generali Arena; Attendance: 9,139; Referee: Ivan Kružliak (Slovakia)

16 November UEFA Euro 2020 Group C Qualifier	Northern Ireland	0–0	Netherlands	Belfast, Northern Ireland
19:45 GMT; Match 647		Report		Stadium: Windsor Park; Attendance: 18,404; Referee: Szymon Marciniak (Poland)

19 November UEFA Euro 2020 Group C Qualifier	Germany	6–1	Northern Ireland	Frankfurt, Germany
19:45 GMT; Match 648	Gnabry 19', 47', 60'; Goretzka 43', 73'; Brandt 90+1'	Report	Smith 7'	Stadium: Commerzbank-Arena; Attendance: 42,855; Referee: Carlos del Cerro Grande (Spain)
