= 2021 Phoenix Rising FC season =

Phoenix Rising FC
2021 season
- Owners: List: Berke Bakay Brett M. Johnson Alex Zheng Tim Riester Mark Detmer Didier Drogba Brandon McCarthy Diplo Pete Wentz David Rappaport Dave Stearns Rick Hauser William Kraus Kevin Kusatsu Mark Leber Jim Scussel Christopher Yeung
- Manager: Rick Schantz
- Stadium: Phoenix Rising Soccer Complex at Wild Horse Pass
- USL Championship: 1st, Pacific Division; 1st, Western Conference
- USLC playoffs: Conference Quarterfinals
- Top goalscorer: Santi Moar (16)
- Highest home attendance: 9,236 (Team Record) (October 23 v. Sacramento Republic FC)
- Lowest home attendance: 4,995 (May 8 v. Oakland Roots SC)
- Average home league attendance: 6,996
- Biggest win: 5–0 (July 17 v. LA Galaxy II)
- Biggest defeat: 0–3 (September 29 at LA Galaxy II)
Home colors	Away colors	Third colors

The 2021 Phoenix Rising FC season was the club's eighth season in the USL Championship and their fifth as Rising FC. They are the defending USL Championship Western Conference champions.

== Competitions ==
=== Friendlies ===
All times from this point on Mountain Standard Time (UTC-07:00)

March 13, 2021 Preseason	Phoenix Rising FC	0–4	Sporting Kansas City	Chandler, Arizona
11:00 AM MST		PHX Report; SKC Report	Harris 9', 19', 33'; Busio 29'	Stadium: Wild Horse Pass Stadium
Note: Closed door scrimmage

March 16, 2021 Preseason	Phoenix Rising FC	0–2	Colorado Rapids	Tucson, Arizona
		PHX Report; COL Report	Larraz 12'; Hundley 22'	Stadium: Kino Sports Complex
Note: Closed door scrimmage; 45 minute match

March 16, 2021 Preseason	Phoenix Rising FC	0–1	Portland Timbers	Tucson, Arizona
		PHX Report; POR Report	? 25' (o.g.)	Stadium: Kino Sports Complex
Note: Closed door scrimmage; 45 minute match

March 20, 2021 Preseason	Phoenix Rising FC	1–3	Portland Timbers	Tucson, Arizona
3:30 PM MST	Quinn 34'	PHX Report; POR Report	Ikoba 17'; Valeri 59'; McGraw 60'	Stadium: Kino Sports Complex
Note: Closed door scrimmage

March 24, 2021 Preseason	Phoenix Rising FC	1–2	Union Omaha	Chandler, Arizona
11:00 AM MST	Dadashov 33'	PHX Report; OMA Report	Scearce 41'; Hurst 53'	Stadium: Wild Horse Pass Stadium
Note: Closed door scrimmage. Played in three 30-minute periods.

March 27, 2021 Preseason	Phoenix Rising FC	1–2	Union Omaha	Chandler, Arizona
11:00 AM MST	Rodríguez 42'	PHX Report	Vanacore-Decker 69'; N'For 90+'	Stadium: Wild Horse Pass Stadium
Note: Closed door scrimmage.

April 4, 2021 Preseason	Seattle Sounders FC	Cancelled	Phoenix Rising FC	Seattle, Washington
				Stadium: Lumen Field
Note: Cancelled by Phoenix Rising FC due to COVID-19 concerns

April 7, 2021 Visit Tucson Sun Cup	Phoenix Rising FC	0–1	Real Salt Lake	Tucson, Arizona
6:00 PM MST			Rusnák 26'	Stadium: Kino North Stadium

April 10, 2021 Visit Tucson Sun Cup	Phoenix Rising FC	0–1	Colorado Rapids	Tucson, Arizona
7:55 PM MST		PHX Report; COL Report	Barrios 20'	Stadium: Kino North Stadium

April 17, 2021 Preseason	Phoenix Rising FC	1–3	Colorado Springs Switchbacks	Chandler, Arizona
	Dadashov 37' (pen.)	PHX Report; COS Report	Ngalina 16'; Trialist 30'; King 75' (o.g.)	Stadium: Wild Horse Pass Stadium
Note: 75 minute game

April 17, 2021 Preseason	Phoenix Rising FC	5–0	Colorado Springs Switchbacks	Chandler, Arizona
	Saydee 8', 58'; Calistri 15'; Gutierrez 35'; Adekoya 45'	PHX Report		Stadium: Wild Horse Pass Stadium
Note: 75 minute game

April 24, 2021 Preseason	Phoenix Rising FC	0–4	New Mexico United	Chandler, Arizona
		PHX Report	Swartz 7'; Martinez 62'; Brown 78', 84'	Stadium: Wild Horse Pass Stadium

April 24, 2021 Preseason	Phoenix Rising FC	2–1	FC Tucson	Chandler, Arizona
	Adekoya 42', 50'	PHX Report	Calixtro 70'	Stadium: Wild Horse Pass Stadium

=== USL Championship ===
Overall								Home						Away					
Pld	W	D	L	GF	GA	GD	Pts	W	D	L	GF	GA	GD	W	D	L	GF	GA	GD
32	20	7	5	68	35	+33	67	11	5	0	41	12	+29	9	2	5	27	23	+4

Source: Match reports

==== Results by round ====
Round	1	2	3	4	5	6	7	8	9	10	11	12	13	14	15	16	17	18	19	20	21	22	23	24	25	26	27	28	29	30	31	32
Stadium	H	H	A	H	A	H	H	A	A	H	A	H	A	H	A	A	H	H	A	H	A	A	H	H	A	A	A	H	A	A	H	H
Result	W	W	L	W	W	D	W	L	W	W	D	W	W	W	W	D	D	D	L	W	W	W	W	W	W	L	W	W	L	W	D	D
Position	1	1	3	1	1	1	1	1	1	1	1	1	1	1	1	1	1	1	1	1	1	1	1	1	1	1	1	1	1	1	1	1

Updated to match(es) played on October 30, 2021. Source: Match reports
A = Away; H = Home; W = Win; D = Draw; L = Loss

==== Matches ====
April 30, 2021 1	Phoenix Rising FC	4–1	San Diego Loyal SC	Chandler, Arizona
7:00 PM MST	Musa (yellow card) 29'; Bakero 39'; Flood (yellow card) 47'; Moar 55'; Quinn 67'; Lambert 80'	PHX Report; SDG Report	Adams (yellow card) 36'; Spencer 65'	Stadium: Phoenix Rising Soccer Complex at Wild Horse Pass; Attendance: 5,000; Referee: Jon Freemon
Note: Stadium limited to 50% capacity due to COVID-19 restrictions

May 8, 2021 2	Phoenix Rising FC	3–0	Oakland Roots SC	Chandler, Arizona
7:30 PM MST	Asante 10', 68'; King (yellow card) 29'; Moar 48'; Lambert (yellow card) 50'; Billingsley (yellow card) 83'; Quinn (yellow card) 86'; Musa (yellow card) 87'	PHX Report; OAK Report	Weir (yellow card) 85'; Ward (yellow card) 87'	Stadium: Phoenix Rising Soccer Complex at Wild Horse Pass; Attendance: 4,995; Referee: Elton Garcia
Note: Stadium limited to 50% capacity due to COVID-19 restrictions

May 15, 2021 3	Tampa Bay Rowdies	2–1	Phoenix Rising FC	St. Petersburg, Florida
5:00 PM MST	Quinn 4' (o.g.); Hilton (yellow card) 40'; Dos Santos 61'; Louro (yellow card) 68'; Adebayo-Smith (yellow card) 90+2'	PHX Report; TBR Report	Quinn (yellow card) 42'; Moar 68'; Dadashov (yellow card) 68'; Adewole (yellow card) 80'; Saydee (yellow card) 86'; Billingsley (yellow card) 90'	Stadium: Al Lang Stadium; Attendance: 2,355; Referee: Ismir Pekmic

May 22, 2021 4	Phoenix Rising FC	5–1	Las Vegas Lights	Chandler, Arizona
7:30 PM MST	Dadashov 2', 55'; Farrell 39'; Lambert (yellow card) 45+1'; Moar 51'; Asante 63' (pen.)	PHX Report	Jennings 22'	Stadium: Phoenix Rising Soccer Complex at Wild Horse Pass; Attendance: 5,000; Referee: Michael Radchuk
Note: Stadium limited to 50% capacity due to COVID-19 restrictions

May 29, 2021 5	Sacramento Republic FC	0–1	Phoenix Rising FC	Sacramento, California
7:30 PM MST		PHX Report; SAC Report	Dadashov (yellow card) 35'; Moar (yellow card) 48' (goal) 62'; Lambert (yellow card) 67'	Stadium: Heart Health Park; Attendance: 2,513; Referee: Brandon Stevis

June 5, 2021 6	Phoenix Rising FC	2–2	San Diego Loyal SC	Chandler, Arizona
7:30 PM MST	Kelly (yellow card) 24'; Calistri (yellow card) 76', (goal) 90+7'; Rodríguez (yellow card) 78'; Flood (yellow card) 86'; Moar 90+1'	PHX Report; SDG Report	Berry 19'; Martin (yellow card) 65'; Hertzog (yellow card) 68'; Blake 71'	Stadium: Phoenix Rising Soccer Complex at Wild Horse Pass; Attendance: 8,058; Referee: Elijio Arreguin

June 12, 2021 7	Phoenix Rising FC	3–0	Tacoma Defiance	Chandler, Arizona
7:30 PM MST	Asante 40', 55'; Calistri (yellow card) 48'; Schmitt 80'; Kelly (yellow card) 89'	PHX Report; TAC Report		Stadium: Phoenix Rising Soccer Complex at Wild Horse Pass; Attendance: 7,360; Referee: Malik Badawi

June 19, 2021 8	San Diego Loyal SC	2–1	Phoenix Rising FC	San Diego, California
7:30 PM MST	Blake 36', 57'; Muse (yellow card) 65'; Metcalf (yellow card) 84'; Spencer (yellow card) 90+1'; Stoneman (yellow card) 90+5'	PHX Report; SDG Report	Quinn (yellow card) 43'; Rodríguez 66' (yellow card) 69'; Farrell (yellow card) 90+3'; Billingsley (yellow card) 90+6'	Stadium: Torero Stadium; Referee: Mark Allatin

June 26, 2021 9	Sacramento Republic FC	1–2	Phoenix Rising FC	Sacramento, California
8:00 PM MST	Alashe (red card) 38'; Felipe (yellow card) 66'; Casey 72'; Formella (yellow card) 77'	PHX Report; SAC Report	Lambert (yellow card) 29'; Asante 31'; Egbo 63'; Quinn (yellow card) 75'; Adewole (yellow card) 90+3'; Bakero (yellow card) 90+6'	Stadium: Heart Health Park; Attendance: 7,112; Referee: Matthew Thompson

July 3, 2021 10	Phoenix Rising FC	3–0	LA Galaxy II	Chandler, Arizona
7:30 PM MST	Schmitt 19'; Asante 46'; Moar 66'; Bakero (yellow card) 90+2'	PHX Report; LAG Report	Vázquez (yellow card) 58'	Stadium: Phoenix Rising Soccer Complex at Wild Horse Pass; Attendance: 8,815; Referee: Joshua Encarnación

July 10, 2021 11	Charlotte Independence	1–1	Phoenix Rising FC	Charlotte, North Carolina
4:00 PM MST	Parra 2' (yellow card) 42'	PHX Report; CLT Report	Egbo 21'; King (yellow card) 61'	Stadium: American Legion Memorial Stadium; Attendance: 2,283; Referee: Elvis Osmanovic

July 17, 2021 12	Phoenix Rising FC	5–0	LA Galaxy II	Chandler, Arizona
7:30 PM MST	Musa 33'; Asante 40'; Dadashov 45'; Egbo 78', 90'; King (yellow card) 87'	PHX Report; USL Report	Hernandez (yellow card) 45+2'; Davila (yellow card) 55'; Harvey (yellow card) 63'; González (yellow card) 87'	Stadium: Phoenix Rising Soccer Complex at Wild Horse Pass; Attendance: 6,645; Referee: Matthew Corrigan

July 24, 2021 13	San Diego Loyal SC	0–1	Phoenix Rising FC	San Diego, California
7:30 PM MST	Blake (yellow card) 81'	PHX Report; SDG Report	Musa 9' (yellow card) 62'; Farrell (yellow card) 59'	Stadium: Torero Stadium; Referee: Lukasz Szpala

July 31, 2021 14	Phoenix Rising FC	3–1	Rio Grande Valley FC	Chandler, Arizona
7:30 PM MST	King 14'; Quinn 19'; Dadashov 27'	PHX Report	Azócar 55'; Cerritos (yellow card) 61'	Stadium: Phoenix Rising Soccer Complex at Wild Horse Pass; Attendance: 6,740; Referee: Sergi Demianchuk

August 4, 2021 15	Oakland Roots SC	0–1	Phoenix Rising FC	Oakland, California
7:00 PM MST		Report	King (yellow card) 10'; Quinn 64'; Schmitt (yellow card) 68'	Stadium: Laney College Football Stadium; Attendance: 3,218; Referee: Ricardo Fierro

August 7, 2021 16	Las Vegas Lights	2–2	Phoenix Rising FC	Las Vegas, Nevada
7:30 PM MST	Molina 12'; Daroma (yellow card) 45+1'; Uche (yellow card) 71'; Traore 84'; Jaime (yellow card) 87'	PHX Report	Moar 29' (pen.); Quinn 45+3'; Madrid (yellow card) 48'; Musa (yellow card) 68'; Lambert (yellow card) 90+2'	Stadium: Cashman Field; Referee: Melvin Rivas

August 14, 2021 17	Phoenix Rising FC	1–1	Orange County SC	Chandler, Arizona
7:30 PM MST	Musa (yellow card) 76'; Saydee 90+6'	PHX Report	Kuningas 32' (yellow card) 85'; Alston (yellow card) 52'; Richards (yellow card) 76'; Powers (yellow card) 79'	Stadium: Phoenix Rising Soccer Complex at Wild Horse Pass; Attendance: 7,158; Referee: Gerald Flores

August 21, 2021 18	Phoenix Rising FC	0–0	Sacramento Republic FC	Chandler, Arizona
7:30 PM MST	Musa (yellow card) 27'; Egbo (yellow card) 51'; Quinn (yellow card) 69'; Farrell (yellow card) 84'	PHX Report	Formella (yellow card) 37'; Gomez (yellow card) 41'; Pennanen (yellow card) 88'	Stadium: Phoenix Rising Soccer Complex at Wild Horse Pass; Attendance: 6,740; Referee: Malik Badawi

August 25, 2021 19	Oakland Roots SC	3–1	Phoenix Rising FC	Livermore, California
TBD	Fall 43'; Hernández 51' (yellow card) 71'; Mbumba 61'	PHX Report; OAK Report	Bakero (yellow card) 45'; King 53' (yellow card) 70'	Stadium: Las Positas College; Referee: William Hoffman
Note: Originally scheduled for July 14, the game was postponed due to COVID-19 concerns and pitch conditions.

August 28, 2021 20	Phoenix Rising FC	3–2	New Mexico United	Chandler, Arizona
7:30 PM MST	King (yellow card) 19'; Calistri 59', 66'; Moar 90'	PHX Report	Rivas 11'; Guzmán (yellow card) 34'; Tetteh (yellow card) 43'; Suggs (yellow card) 54'; Musa 80' (o.g.)	Stadium: Phoenix Rising Soccer Complex at Wild Horse Pass; Attendance: 7,324; Referee: Ismir Pekmic

September 5, 2021 21	Tacoma Defiance	1–3	Phoenix Rising FC	Tacoma, Washington
1:30 PM MST	Adeniran 35', (yellow card) 83'; Atencio (yellow card) 37' (yellow-red card) 59'; Herrera (yellow card) 89'	Report	Mattocks 4', 32'; King (yellow card) 35'; Musa (yellow card) 42'; Lambert (yellow card) 80'; Schmitt (yellow card) 80'; Moar 90' (pen.)	Stadium: Cheney Stadium; Attendance: 1,185; Referee: Lorenzo Hernandez

September 11, 2021 22	LA Galaxy II	3–4	Phoenix Rising FC	Carson, California
7:30 PM MST	Cabral 12' (yellow card) 50'; Vázquez 27'; Judd (yellow card) 60'; Perez (yellow card) 80' (goal) 86'	PHX Report	Farrell (yellow card) 19' (red card) 80'; Quinn 21' (pen.); Lambert 31'; Moar 35'; Schmitt (yellow card) 37'; Musa (yellow card) 72'; Vázquez 90+5' (o.g.)	Stadium: Dignity Health Sports Park; Track & Field Stadium; Attendance: 0 Referee: Ricardo Fierro

September 15, 2021 23	Phoenix Rising FC	4–1	Las Vegas Lights	Chandler, Arizona
7:30 PM MST	Quinn 2'; Moar 17'; Rodríguez 29' (yellow card) 70'; Bakero 82'	PHX Report	Leone (yellow card) 16'; Vázquez 27'; Daroma (yellow card) 90'	Stadium: Phoenix Rising Soccer Complex at Wild Horse Pass; Attendance: 5,839; Referee: Luis Guardia

September 18, 2021 24	Phoenix Rising FC	2–1	Orange County SC	Chandler, Arizona
7:30 PM MST	Moar 9' (yellow card) 42'; Schmitt (yellow card) 31' (yellow-red card) 45+1'; Lambert (yellow card) 85'; Mattocks 86'; Rawls (yellow card) 90'	PHX Rising; OCO Report	Iloski (yellow card) 33'; Damus 47'; Mines (yellow card) 82'	Stadium: Phoenix Rising Soccer Complex at Wild Horse Pass; Attendance: 7,500; Referee: Elton García

September 25, 2021 25	Tacoma Defiance	1–2	Phoenix Rising FC	Tacoma, Washington
7:00 PM MST	Serrano (yellow card) 43'; Adeniran 80'	PHX Report; TAC Report	Bakero 78'; Moar 90' (yellow card) 90+3'	Stadium: Cheney Stadium; Attendance: 1,370; Referee: Brad Jensen

September 29, 2021 26	LA Galaxy II	3–0	Phoenix Rising FC	Carson, California
7:30 PM MST	Delgado 77' (o.g.); Judd (yellow card) 85' (goal) 88'; Hernandez 90+1'	PHX Report; LAG Report	Seijas (yellow card) 27'; Schmitt (red card) 45+2'; Madrid (yellow card) 56'	Stadium: Dignity Health Sports Park; Track & Field Stadium; Attendance: 0 Referee: Benjamin Meyer

October 2, 2021 27	Orange County SC	0–1	Phoenix Rising FC	Irvine, California
7:00 PM MST	Powers (yellow card) 57'	PHX Report; OCO Report	Mattocks 32'; Seijas (yellow card) 74'; Quinn (yellow card) 90+6'	Stadium: Championship Soccer Stadium; Attendance: 5,130; Referee: Matthew Thompson

October 9, 2021 28	Phoenix Rising FC	1–0	Oakland Roots SC	Chandler, Arizona
7:30 PM MST	Mattocks 11'; Saydee (yellow card) 90+6'	PHX Report	Hernández (yellow card) 87'; Morad (yellow card) 90+1'	Stadium: Phoenix Rising Soccer Complex at Wild Horse Pass; Attendance: 8,095; Referee: Matthew Corrigan

October 13, 2021 29	Orange County SC	1–0	Phoenix Rising FC	Irvine, California
7:00 PM MST	Mines 18' (yellow card) 45+3'; Smith (yellow card) 71'; McCabe (yellow card) 90'	PHX Report	Saydee (yellow card) 49'; Rodríguez (yellow card) 82'	Stadium: Championship Soccer Stadium; Attendance: 3,922; Referee: Mark Allatin

October 16, 2021 30	Las Vegas Lights	3–6	Phoenix Rising FC	Las Vegas, Nevada
2:00 PM MST	Jennings 19', 41', 83'; Daroma (yellow card) 33'	PHX Report	Egbo 4'; Calistri 16'; Moar 17', 70'; Loera (yellow card) 25'; King 52'; Farrell (yellow card) 75'; Seijas 85'	Stadium: Cashman Field; Referee: Calin Radosav

October 23, 2021 31	Phoenix Rising FC	1–1	Sacramento Republic FC	Chandler, Arizona
7:30 PM MST	Moar (yellow card) 60'; Quinn (yellow card) 83'; Kibunguchy 84' (o.g.)	PHX Report; SAC Report	Felipe 23'; McCrary (yellow card) 32'; Wheeler-Omiunu (yellow card) 74'; Kibunguchy (yellow card) 82'	Stadium: Phoenix Rising Soccer Complex at Wild Horse Pass; Attendance: 9,236; Referee: Elijio Arreguin

October 30, 2021 32	Phoenix Rising FC	1–1	Tacoma Defiance	Chandler, Arizona
7:30 PM MST	Rodríguez 70'; Schmitt (yellow card) 88'; Lambert (yellow card) 89'	Report	Adeniran 30' (yellow card) 80'; Vargas (yellow card) 38'; Brewitt (yellow card) 71'; Mueller (yellow card) 90+3'	Stadium: Phoenix Rising Soccer Complex at Wild Horse Pass; Attendance: 7,436; Referee: Luis Arroyo

==== Group table ====
Pos	Team	Pld	W	L	T	GF	GA	GD	Pts	Qualification
1	Phoenix Rising FC	32	20	5	7	68	35	+33	67	Advance to USL Championship Playoffs
2	Orange County SC	32	15	10	7	44	37	+7	52	Advance to USL Championship Playoffs
3	San Diego Loyal SC	32	14	12	6	51	43	+8	48	Advance to USL Championship Playoffs
4	Oakland Roots SC	32	11	13	8	36	43	−7	41	Advance to USL Championship Playoffs
5	Tacoma Defiance	32	10	13	9	37	41	−4	39 (Note: Head-to-head points: Tacoma Defiance 8, LA Galaxy II 2.)	
6	LA Galaxy II	32	11	15	6	55	57	−2	39	
7	Sacramento Republic FC	32	8	12	12	36	42	−6	36	
8	Las Vegas Lights FC	32	6	23	3	41	77	−36	21	

Source: USL

=== USL Championship Playoffs ===
==== Conference Playoffs ====
November 6, 2021 Quarterfinals	Phoenix Rising FC	3–3 (a.e.t.) (3–4 p)	Rio Grande Valley FC	Chandler, Arizona
7:30 pm MST	Asante 23', 101' (yellow card) 73'; Rodríguez (yellow card) 39' (goal) 54'; Moar (yellow card) 120+1'	PHX Report	Njie 19' (yellow card) 22'; Cabezas (yellow card) 37'; Pimentel (yellow card) 66'; López 71' (yellow card) 73'; Amoh 109' (pen.)	Stadium: Phoenix Rising Soccer Complex at Wild Horse Pass; Attendance: 8,234; Referee: Brandon Stevis
	Penalties
	Bakero (penalty scored); Rodríguez (penalty missed); Quinn (penalty missed); Farrell (penalty scored); Moar (penalty scored)		(penalty scored) Njie; (penalty scored) Ycaza; (penalty scored) Pimentel; (penalty missed) López; (penalty scored) Amoh

== Roster ==
No.	Name	Nationality	Position(s)	Date of birth (age)	Signed in	Previous club
Goalkeepers
24	Andre Rawls	(United States)	GK	December 20, 1991 (age 34)	2021	(United States) Colorado Rapids (loan)
26	Edward Delgado	(United States)	GK	January 23, 1998 (age 28)	2021	(United States) Las Vegas Lights FC
28	Zac Lubin	(United States)	GK	August 15, 1989 (age 37)	2021	(Sweden) Ljungskile SK
39	Ben Lundt	(Germany)	GK	September 24, 1995 (age 30)	2021	(United States) FC Cincinnati (loan)
Defenders
2	Darnell King	(United States)	DF	September 23, 1990 (age 35)	2021	(United States) Nashville SC
3	Manuel Madrid	(Mexico)	DF	August 29, 1993 (age 33)	2021	(Mexico) Mineros de Zacatecas
4	Ryan Flood	(United States)	DF	October 17, 1998 (age 27)	2021	(United States) FC Arizona
5	Tobi Adewole	(United States)	DF	October 14, 1995 (age 30)	2021	(United States) Saint Louis FC
6	Noah Billingsley	(New Zealand)	DF	August 6, 1997 (age 29)	2021	(United States) Minnesota United FC (loan)
15	Joe Farrell	(United States)	DF	February 13, 1994 (age 32)	2021	(United States) Rochester Rhinos
19	Niall Dunn	(United States)	DF	October 18, 2004 (age 21)	2021	(United States) Phoenix Rising Academy
25	Tate Schmitt	(United States)	DF	May 28, 1997 (age 29)	2021	(United States) Real Salt Lake (loan)
41	James Musa	(New Zealand)	DF	April 1, 1992 (age 34)	2021	(United States) Minnesota United FC
Midfielders
8	Iván Gutiérrez	(Mexico)	MF	February 16, 1998 (age 28)	2021	(United States) LA Galaxy II
10	Jon Bakero	(Spain)	MF	November 5, 1996 (age 29)	2021	(Canada) Toronto FC
12	Arturo Rodríguez	(Mexico)	MF	December 15, 1998 (age 27)	2021	(United States) North Texas SC
13	Aodhan Quinn	(United States)	MF	March 22, 1992 (age 34)	2021	(United States) Orange County SC
18	Luis Manuel Seijas	(Venezuela)	MF	June 23, 1986 (age 40)	2021	(Colombia) Independiente Santa Fe
23	Jonathan Levin	(Mexico)	MF	May 6, 1993 (age 33)	2021	(United States) Las Vegas Lights FC
27	Kevon Lambert	(Jamaica)	MF	March 22, 1997 (age 29)	2021	(Jamaica) Montego Bay United
30	David Loera	(Spain)	MF	September 10, 1998 (age 28)	2021	(United States) Orlando City SC (loan)
Forwards
7	Santi Moar	(Spain)	FW	September 5, 1993 (age 33)	2021	(United States) New Mexico United
9	Rufat Dadashov	(Azerbaijan)	FW	September 29, 1991 (age 34)	2021	(Germany) SC Preußen Münster
17	Prince Saydee	(Liberia)	FW	February 20, 1996 (age 30)	2021	(United States) Miami FC
20	Solomon Asante	(Ghana)	FW	March 6, 1990 (age 36)	2021	(Democratic Republic of the Congo) TP Mazembe
21	Joey Calistri	(United States)	FW	November 20, 1993 (age 32)	2021	(United States) Saint Louis FC
22	Seyi Adekoya	(United States)	FW	December 5, 1995 (age 30)	2021	(Denmark) Thisted FC
56	David Egbo	(Nigeria)	FW	October 31, 1998 (age 27)	2021	(Canada) Vancouver Whitecaps FC (loan)

Phoenix Rising Academy contract.

== Player transactions ==
=== Loan in ===
Start date	End date	Position	No.	Player	From club	Ref.
March 24, 2021	July 1, 2021	Defender	18	(United States) Jeremy Kelly	(United States) Colorado Rapids	
March 24, 2021	End of Season	Goalkeeper	24	(United States) Andre Rawls	(United States) Colorado Rapids	
April 13, 2021	End of Season	Defender	6	(New Zealand) Noah Billingsley	(United States) Minnesota United FC	
May 6, 2021	August 27, 2021	Goalkeeper	39	(Germany) Ben Lundt	(United States) FC Cincinnati	
June 3, 2021	End of Season	Forward	56	(Nigeria) David Egbo	(Canada) Vancouver Whitecaps FC	
June 10, 2021	End of Season	Defender	25	(United States) Tate Schmitt	(United States) Real Salt Lake	
September 9, 2021	End of Season	Midfielder	30	(Spain) David Loera	(United States) Orlando City SC	

=== Loan out ===
Start date	End date	Position	No.	Player	To club	Ref.
July 1, 2021	End of Season	Defender	3	(New Zealand) Deklan Wynne	(United States) OKC Energy FC	
August 7, 2021	End of Season	Forward	22	(United States) Seyi Adekoya	(United States) OKC Energy FC	

=== Transfer In ===
Date	Position	No.	Player	From club	Ref.
July 15, 2021	Defender	3	(Mexico) Manuel Madrid	(Mexico) Mineros de Zacatecas	
August 18, 2021	Forward	9	(Jamaica) Darren Mattocks	(Sudan) Al-Merrikh SC	
September 8, 2021	Midfielder	18	(Venezuela) Luis Manuel Seijas	(Colombia) Independiente Santa Fe	

=== Transfer Out ===
Date	Position	No.	Player	To club	Ref.
August 12, 2021	Forward	9	(Azerbaijan) Rufat Dadashov	(Germany) FC Schalke 04 II	

== Statistics ==
(regular-season & Playoffs)

#	Pos.	Name	GP	GS	Min.	Goals	Assists	A yellow rectangle, denoting the yellow penalty card shown to a player being cautioned	A red rectangle, denoting the red penalty card shown to a player being sent off
7	FW	(Spain) Santi Moar	33	31	2624	16	4	6	0
20	FW	(Ghana) Solomon Asante	26	25	2167	10	7	1	0
14	MF	(United States) Aodhan Quinn	31	29	2589	6	11	7	0
56	FW	(Nigeria) David Egbo	17	10	861	5	1	1	0
9	FW	(Jamaica) Darren Mattocks	11	9	727	5	0	0	0
12	MF	(Mexico) Arturo Rodríguez	29	16	1600	4	5	5	0
21	FW	(United States) Joey Calistri	29	13	1326	4	1	2	0
9	FW	(Azerbaijan) Rufat Dadashov	14	11	888	4	2	2	0
2	DF	(United States) Darnell King	30	28	2498	3	1	7	0
10	MF	(Spain) Jon Bakero	26	17	1427	3	2	3	0
41	DF	(New Zealand) James Musa	32	32	2910	2	1	9	0
27	MF	(Jamaica) Kevon Lambert	30	29	2447	2	0	8	0
25	DF	(United States) Tate Schmitt	23	19	1723	2	1	3	2
15	DF	(United States) Joe Farrell	25	20	1846	1	3	5	1
17	FW	(Liberia) Prince Saydee	24	3	460	1	1	3	0
18	MF	(Venezuela) Luis Manuel Seijas	7	2	319	1	2	2	0
4	DF	(United States) Ryan Flood	21	14	1220	0	0	2	0
5	DF	(United States) Tobi Adewole	15	13	1141	0	0	3	0
3	DF	(Mexico) Manuel Madrid	11	6	553	0	0	2	0
30	MF	(Spain) David Loera	11	4	420	0	0	1	0
22	FW	(United States) Seyi Adekoya	11	3	321	0	0	1	0
18	DF	(United States) Jeremy Kelly	5	2	245	0	1	2	0
8	MF	(Mexico) Iván Gutiérrez	9	1	143	0	0	0	0
6	DF	(New Zealand) Noah Billingsley	8	1	130	0	0	3	0
19	DF	(United States) Niall Dunn	1	1	90	0	0	0	0
23	DF	(Mexico) Jonathan Levin	2	0	17	0	0	0	0

- One Own Goal each scored by LA Galaxy II and Sacramento Republic FC

=== Goalkeepers ===
#	Name	GP	GS	Min.	SV	GA	GAA	SO	A yellow rectangle, denoting the yellow penalty card shown to a player being cautioned	A red rectangle, denoting the red penalty card shown to a player being sent off
24	(United States) Andre Rawls	22	22	2009	62	22	0.986	6	1	0
39	(Germany) Ben Lundt	9	9	810	23	10	1.111	4	0	0
26	(United States) Edward Delgado	3	2	181	6	6	2.985	0	0	0

== See also ==
- 2021 in American soccer
- 2021 USL Championship season
- Phoenix Rising FC
