= Egbo (surname) =

Egbo is a surname. Notable people with the surname include:

- David Egbo (born 1998), Nigerian footballer
- Mandela Egbo (born 1997), British footballer
- Ndubuisi Egbo (born 1973), Nigerian football manager and former footballer
- Queen Egbo (born 2000), American basketball player

== See also ==
- Egbo Osita (born 1988), Nigerian football defender and midfielder
