= Deklan Wynne =

New Zealand footballer

Personal information
- Full name: Deklan Terrence Wynne
- Date of birth: 20 March 1995 (age 31)
- Place of birth: Johannesburg, South Africa
- Height: 1.78 m (5 ft 10 in)
- Position: Left-back

Youth career
- –2013: East Coast Bays

Senior career*
| Years | Team | Apps | (Gls) |
| 2013–2015 | Wanderers SC | 26 | (0) |
| 2015–2017 | Whitecaps FC 2 | 35 | (2) |
| 2017 | → Vancouver Whitecaps (loan) | 0 | (0) |
| 2018–2020 | Colorado Rapids | 36 | (0) |
| 2021 | Phoenix Rising | 0 | (0) |
| 2021 | → OKC Energy (loan) | 14 | (0) |
| 2022 | Detroit City | 33 | (3) |
| 2023 | Charleston Battery | 29 | (0) |
| 2024 | Port Vale | 0 | (0) |
| 2025– | Green Gully | | |

International career^{‡}
| 2014–2015 | New Zealand U20 | 7 | (0) |
| 2015 | New Zealand U23 | 2 | (0) |
| 2014– | New Zealand | 16 | (0) |
- * Club domestic league appearances and goals as of 11:12, 11 April 2024 (UTC) ‡ National team caps and goals as of 11:12, 11 April 2024 (UTC)

Deklan Terrence Wynne (born 20 March 1995) is a New Zealand professional footballer who plays as a left-back for NPL Victoria club Green Gully. A New Zealand international, he played in the 2017 FIFA Confederations Cup. However, as he was born in South Africa, he was judged to be ineligible to represent New Zealand at the Olympics. As a result, New Zealand were excluded from competing in football at the 2016 Olympic Games.

Wynne began his professional career with Wanderers SC after moving from East Coast Bays in 2013. He played 26 games in the New Zealand Football Championship before being signed to Whitecaps FC 2, the reserve team to the Vancouver Whitecaps, in August 2015. He played 35 games in the United Soccer League before being traded to the Colorado Rapids in December 2017. He played 36 games during three seasons in Major League Soccer. He returned to the USL Championship, spending one season each with OKC Energy (on loan from Phoenix Rising), Detroit City and Charleston Battery. He was named defender of the year at the league's Mid-Season Award in 2022. He signed a short-term deal with English club Port Vale in April 2024. He signed with Australian club Green Gully for the 2025 season.

== Early and personal life ==
Deklan Terrence Wynne was born in Johannesburg, South Africa, to Terrence and Joanne on 20 March 1995. His younger brother, Ronan, played soccer for the Denver Pioneers. The family moved to New Zealand in 2010 when Wynne was 14 years old.

== Club career ==
=== Wanderers to Whitecaps ===
Wynne signed for Wanderers SC from East Coast Bays in 2013. On 13 August 2015, Wynne signed with United Soccer League side Whitecaps FC 2, the reserve team of the Vancouver Whitecaps. Head coach Alan Koch said that Wynne had a "cultured left foot and is very comfortable on the ball". He played four games as the 2015 USL season drew to a close and was limited to eleven appearances in the 2016 USL season as he missed eight months with a groin injury. Despite these injury setbacks, head coach Carl Robinson rated him as a player with high potential. He was retained by new head coach Rich Fagan. He experienced more game time in the 2017 USL season and ended his time at the club with two goals and one assist in 29 starts and six substitute appearances; he was named on the USL Team of the Week for Week 3 for his performance in a win over Seattle Sounders FC 2. At one stage the Whitecaps had two other New Zealanders besides Wynne in goalkeeper Stefan Marinovic and forward Myer Bevan.

=== Colorado Rapids ===
Whitecaps traded Wynne to the Colorado Rapids on 21 December 2017 in exchange for $100,000 of Targeted Allocation Money. The Rapids were coached by fellow New Zealander Anthony Hudson and interim general manager Padraig Smith said that Wynne would be a "long-term solution" for the club. On 31 March 2018, he played in a 3–0 win over Philadelphia Union and won a place on the MLS Team of the Week. On 22 September, he was sent off for serious foul play in a 2–1 defeat at Columbus Crew. However, the red card was rescinded on appeal.

The defensive back three of Wynne, Tommy Smith and Danny Wilson struggled in the 2019 season as the Rapids cycled between head coaches from Hudson to Conor Casey and then Robin Fraser. He did not feature at all under Fraser in the 2020 season as midfielder Kellyn Acosta was preferred out of position when regular left-back Sam Vines was injured. Wynne was the only player to have their contract option declined at the season's end.

=== USL Championship clubs ===
Wynne signed with Phoenix Rising of the USL Championship on 14 January 2021, where head coach Rick Schantz was impressed by his footballing intelligence. Wynne was loaned to fellow USL Championship side OKC Energy on 1 July 2021. He played 14 games under Leigh Veidman in the 2021 season.

On 28 January 2022, Wynne signed with Detroit City ahead of their inaugural USL Championship season. He was one of head coach Trevor James's most selected players, becoming the second-highest assist maker after Antoine Hoppenot. He was named as defender of the year at the league's Mid-Season Award.

On 3 January 2023, Wynne signed a multi-year deal with USL Championship side Charleston Battery. He said he was drawn to the club by the attacking philosophy of head coach Ben Pirmann. He left Charleston following the 2023 season.

=== Port Vale ===
On 10 April 2024, Wynne signed a short-term deal with League One side Port Vale until the end of the season, following a successful trial period. He was signed with a view to the following campaign as only 16 days remained of the 2023–24 season, though injuries to Dan Jones and Mitch Clark had left manager Darren Moore with only limited options at full-back for the club's fight against relegation. Wynne himself picked up a muscle strain, however, and did not feature before the season's end. He returned to the club on trial the following pre-season, though left after the club instead signed Sam Hart.

=== Green Gully ===
Wynne signed up with NPL Victoria club Green Gully for the 2025 season.

== International career ==
Wynne first represented New Zealand at senior level, his international debut came against China in November 2014 having been called up due to injuries to Louis Fenton and Tom Doyle. Wynne provided the assist for Chris Wood to equalise at 1–1. He made further international appearances against Thailand four days later. In March 2015, he played against South Korea.

Wynne was selected for the New Zealand national under-20 team to play at the 2015 U-20 World Cup in May 2015. He played in all possible matches for New Zealand; three group stage games against Ukraine, United States, Myanmar and a Round of 16 loss against Portugal.

In July 2015, Wynne was again selected by the New Zealand national under-23 team, known as the "Oly Whites" for the 2015 Pacific Games football tournament, he played in the final group stage game against New Caledonia. As non-Pacific Games Council members, New Zealand were not able to qualify for the Pacific Games semi-final, but as members of FIFA and the International Olympic Committee, were able to qualify for the 2016 Summer Olympics qualifying semi-final stage. Wynne played in the semi-final, which New Zealand won 2–0 against Vanuatu. Vanuatu formally protested the eligibility of Wynne following their 2–0 loss at the semi-final stage of the Olympic Qualifying section in which Wynne featured. The Oceania Football Confederation (OFC) awarded a 3–0 victory to Vanuatu after finding that Wynne was ineligible to play in the Olympic qualifying rounds.

New Zealand Football announced that they would be challenging the decision, claiming that the Pacific Games Council confirmed the eligibility of the squad in advance of the tournament and that they acted in "good faith". To be eligible for the New Zealand representative team, Wynne, or a parent or grandparent would need to have been born in New Zealand, or he would have needed to have become a New Zealand citizen before the age of 18 – the age when FIFA's requirement for a player to live on the territory of the football association for five years would take effect. An appeal to the OFC against their expulsion from Olympic qualifying was rejected in October 2015. In January 2016, New Zealand Football successfully applied for an exemption from the FIFA eligibility requirements, making Wynne eligible to play for New Zealand.

He was selected in the squad for the 2017 FIFA Confederations Cup. He described his selection as "like a dream come true". He played in New Zealand's defeats to Russia and Mexico, though was dropped for Tom Doyle for the final group game against Portugal. He played both legs of the OFC–CONMEBOL play-off tie for the 2018 FIFA World Cup qualification process, which ended in a 2–0 aggregate defeat to Peru. This was his last international appearance for five years, with his next game being against Australia in November 2022. He was recalled to the national team by interim head coach Darren Bazeley in March 2023.

== Style of play ==
Wynne is a modern left-back or left-wing-back reported to have quickness, agility and stamina. A left-footed player, he can also play as a right-sided centre-back.

== Career statistics ==
=== Club ===
As of match played 16 March 2024

Appearances and goals by club, season and competition
| Club | Season | League | | | National cup (Note: Includes U.S. Open Cup, FA Cup, Chatham Cup) | | League cup (Note: Includes EFL Cup) | | Other | | Total | |
| Club | Season | Division | Apps | Goals | Apps | Goals | Apps | Goals | Apps | Goals | Apps | Goals |
|---|---|---|---|---|---|---|---|---|---|---|---|---|
| Wanderers SC | 2013–14 | NZF Championship | 14 | 0 | — | | — | | — | | 14 | 0 |
| Wanderers SC | 2014–15 | NZF Championship | 12 | 0 | — | | — | | — | | 12 | 0 |
| Wanderers SC | Total | | 26 | 0 | — | | 0 | 0 | — | | 26 | 0 |
| Whitecaps FC 2 | 2015 | United Soccer League | 4 | 0 | 0 | 0 | — | | — | | 4 | 0 |
| Whitecaps FC 2 | 2016 | United Soccer League | 11 | 0 | 0 | 0 | — | | — | | 11 | 0 |
| Whitecaps FC 2 | 2017 | United Soccer League | 20 | 2 | 0 | 0 | — | | — | | 20 | 2 |
| Whitecaps FC 2 | Total | | 35 | 2 | 0 | 0 | — | | — | | 35 | 2 |
| Vancouver Whitecaps (loan) | 2017 | Major League Soccer | 0 | 0 | 1 | 0 | — | | — | | 1 | 0 |
| Colorado Rapids | 2018 | Major League Soccer | 25 | 0 | 1 | 0 | — | | 2 (Note: Appearance(s) in the CONCACAF Champions Cup) | 0 | 28 | 0 |
| Colorado Rapids | 2019 | Major League Soccer | 11 | 0 | 0 | 0 | — | | — | | 11 | 0 |
| Colorado Rapids | 2020 | Major League Soccer | 0 | 0 | 0 | 0 | — | | — | | 0 | 0 |
| Colorado Rapids | Total | | 36 | 0 | 1 | 0 | — | | 2 | 0 | 39 | 0 |
| Phoenix Rising | 2021 | USL Championship | 0 | 0 | — | | — | | — | | 0 | 0 |
| OKC Energy (loan) | 2021 | USL Championship | 14 | 0 | — | | — | | — | | 14 | 0 |
| Detroit City | 2022 | USL Championship | 33 | 3 | 3 | 0 | — | | — | | 36 | 3 |
| Charleston Battery | 2023 | USL Championship | 29 | 0 | 3 | 0 | — | | — | | 32 | 0 |
| Port Vale | 2023–24 | EFL League One | 0 | 0 | — | | — | | — | | 0 | 0 |
| Career total | | | 173 | 5 | 8 | 0 | 0 | 0 | 2 | 0 | 183 | 5 |

=== International ===
Appearances and goals by national team and year
| National team | Year | Apps | Goals |
|---|---|---|---|
| New Zealand | 2014 | 2 | 0 |
| New Zealand | 2015 | 1 | 0 |
| New Zealand | 2016 | 3 | 0 |
| New Zealand | 2017 | 9 | 0 |
| New Zealand | 2022 | 1 | 0 |
| Total | | 16 | 0 |
