= Tate Schmitt =

American soccer player

Personal information
- Full name: Tate Matthew Schmitt
- Date of birth: May 28, 1997 (age 29)
- Place of birth: Phoenix, Arizona, United States
- Height: 5 ft 10 in (1.78 m)
- Position: Defender

Team information
- Current team: Phoenix Rising
- Number: 48

Youth career
- 2014–2015: Real Salt Lake AZ

College career
Years	Team	Apps	(Gls)
2015–2018	Louisville Cardinals	80	(26)

Senior career*
Years	Team	Apps	(Gls)
2016–2018	FC Tucson	30	(10)
2019–2022	Real Salt Lake	24	(2)
2019	→ Real Monarchs	15	(2)
2021	→ Phoenix Rising (loan)	22	(2)
2022	→ Real Monarchs	1	(1)
2023–2024	Houston Dynamo	21	(1)
2024	Houston Dynamo 2	4	(0)
2025	Nashville SC	2	(0)
2026–	Phoenix Rising	11	(0)
- * Club domestic league appearances and goals as of October 31, 2025

Tate Matthew Schmitt (born May 28, 1997) is an American professional soccer player who plays as a defender.

== Career ==
=== Youth, college, and amateur ===
Schmitt played two seasons at Desert Vista High School prior to joining the Real Salt Lake Arizona academy.

Schmitt played four years of college soccer at the University of Louisville between 2015 and 2018, scoring 26 goals and tallying 17 assists in 80 appearances. He was named to the 2015 ACC All-Freshman Team and the TopDrawerSoccer.com Freshman Best XI Second Team. As a junior he was named to the All-ACC Second Team and the United Soccer Coaches All-South Region Third Team. His senior season saw him make the All-ACC First Team, TopDrawerSoccer.com Best XI Second Team, and United Soccer Coaches All-South Region First Team. Schmitt helped the Cardinals win the 2018 ACC men's soccer tournament, with Schmitt being named tournament MVP.

Schmitt also played with USL Premier Development League side FC Tucson while at Louisville.

=== Professional ===
==== Real Salt Lake ====
On January 3, 2019, Schmitt signed as a Homegrown Player for Real Salt Lake of Major League Soccer. Schmitt made his RSL and MLS debut on March 23, getting the start in a 2–1 loss against Los Angeles FC. He ended his rookie season with 8 total appearances for RSL, 6 MLS appearances, plus an appearance each in the Open Cup and Leagues Cup. Schmitt primarily played for RSL's USL Championship affiliate, Real Monarchs. He scored 2 goals and had an assist in 15 regular season games for the Monarchs, while adding 1 goal and 3 assists in 4 playoff games, helping the Monarchs win the 2019 USL Championship Playoffs.

In a shortened 2020 season due to the COVID-19 pandemic, Schmitt made 4 appearances for RSL.

On June 10, 2021, Schmitt was loaned to his hometown club Phoenix Rising. On June 12 he made his debut and scored his first goal for Phoenix in a 3–1 win over the Tacoma Defiance. Schmitt ended the regular season with 22 appearances, 2 goals, and 1 assist, helping Phoenix finish 1st in the Western Conference. Rising lost in the first round of the playoffs on penalties to Rio Grande Valley FC.

Following the 2021 season, Schmitt's contract option was declined by Salt Lake, but was re-signed on January 19, 2022. He scored his first goal for RSL on March 11, finding the right side netting in the 90+3rd minute to beat the New England Revolution 3–2. Schmitt ended the regular season with 14 appearances and 2 goals, helping RSL finish 7th in the Western Conference, qualifying for the playoffs. RSL lost in the first round on penalties to Austin FC, with Schmitt missing the decisive penalty in the shootout.

Following the 2022 season, his contract option was declined by Salt Lake.

==== Houston Dynamo ====
On February 17, 2023, Schmitt signed with the Houston Dynamo. He made his Dynamo debut and scored his first goal for the club on February 26 in a 2–1 loss to FC CIncinnati in the opening match of the season. Schmitt started the first five matches of the 2023 season at left back for the Dynamo, but he sustained a knee injury while playing against the San Jose Earthquakes on April 1, which would require surgery and keep him out for the remainder of the season.

Schmitt made his return to action in Houston's opening competitive fixture, against St. Louis City SC in the CONCACAF Champions Cup on February 20, 2024. Schmitt was generally second-choice at left back behind Franco Escobar during the 2024 season, making 17 appearances and four starts in the league. For the second time in three seasons, Schmitt missed the decisive penalty in the shootout which saw his team eliminated in the first round, this time against the Seattle Sounders.

==== Nashville SC ====
On May 21, 2025, Schmitt signed a one-year contract with Nashville SC.

== Career statistics ==
As of February 26, 2023

Club	Season	League			National cup		Playoffs		Continental		Total	
Club	Season	Division	Apps	Goals	Apps	Goals	Apps	Goals	Apps	Goals	Apps	Goals
FC Tucson	2016	PDL	14	6	0	0	0	0	—		14	6
FC Tucson	2017	PDL	11	5	1	0	0	0	—		12	5
FC Tucson	2018	PDL	5	0	0	0	0	0	—		5	0
FC Tucson	Total		30	10	1	0	0	0	0	0	31	10
Real Salt Lake	2019	MLS	6	0	1	0	0	0	1 (Note: Appearance in Leagues Cup)	0	8	0
Real Salt Lake	2020	MLS	4	0	—		—		—		4	0
Real Salt Lake	2021	MLS	0	0	—		0	0	—		0	0
Real Salt Lake	2022	MLS	14	2	1	0	1	0	—		16	2
Real Salt Lake	Total		24	2	2	0	1	0	1	0	28	2
Real Monarchs	2019	USLC	15	2	—		4	1	—		19	3
Real Monarchs	2022	MLS Next Pro	1	1	—		—		—		1	1
Real Monarchs	Total		16	3	0	0	4	1	0	0	20	3
Phoenix Rising (loan)	2021	USLC	22	1	—		1	0	—		23	1
Houston Dynamo	2023	MLS	1	1	0	0	0	0	0	0	1	1
Career total			93	17	3	0	6	1	1	0	103	18

== Honors ==
Real Monarchs

- USL Cup: 2019

== Personal life ==
Schmitt was born and raised in Phoenix, Arizona, to RuthAn and Gil Schmitt. His brother Reid played for FC Tucson and Phoenix FC while his brother Andrew played collegiately for the Fort Lewis Skyhawks.
