= 2014 FIFA World Cup qualification – UEFA Group F =

Football tournament qualification stage

The 2014 FIFA World Cup qualification UEFA Group F was a UEFA qualifying group for the 2014 FIFA World Cup. The group was one of nine qualifying groups from UEFA and comprised Azerbaijan, Israel, Luxembourg, Northern Ireland, Portugal and Russia.

The group winners, Russia, qualified directly for the 2014 FIFA World Cup. Portugal placed among the eight best runners-up and advanced to the play-offs, where they were drawn to play home-and-away matches against Sweden. They won both matches and thus also qualified for the World Cup.

== Standings ==
Pos	Team	Pld	W	D	L	GF	GA	GD	Pts	Qualification	Russia national football team	Portugal national football team	Israel national football team	Azerbaijan national football team	Northern Ireland national football team	Luxembourg national football team
1	Russia	10	7	1	2	20	5	+15	22	Qualification to 2014 FIFA World Cup	—	1–0	3–1	1–0	2–0	4–1
2	Portugal	10	6	3	1	20	9	+11	21	Advance to second round	1–0	—	1–1	3–0	1–1	3–0
3	Israel	10	3	5	2	19	14	+5	14		0–4	3–3	—	1–1	1–1	3–0
4	Azerbaijan	10	1	6	3	7	11	−4	9		1–1	0–2	1–1	—	2–0	1–1
5	Northern Ireland	10	1	4	5	9	17	−8	7		1–0	2–4	0–2	1–1	—	1–1
6	Luxembourg	10	1	3	6	7	26	−19	6		0–4	1–2	0–6	0–0	3–2	—

== Matches ==
The match schedule was determined at a meeting in Luxembourg City, Luxembourg, on 25 November 2011.

7 September 2012
19:00 UTC+4

Russia	2–0	Northern Ireland
Fayzulin 30'; Shirokov 78' (pen.)	Report

Lokomotiv Stadium, Moscow
Attendance: 14,300
Referee: Antonio Mateu Lahoz (Spain)
7 September 2012
21:00 UTC+5

Azerbaijan	1–1	Israel
Abishov 65'	Report	Natcho 50'

Tofiq Bahramov Republican Stadium, Baku
Attendance: 22,211
Referee: Matej Jug (Slovenia)
7 September 2012
20:45 UTC+2

Luxembourg	1–2	Portugal
da Mota 13'	Report	Ronaldo 28'; Postiga 54'

Stade Josy Barthel, Luxembourg City
Attendance: 8,125
Referee: Kristo Tohver (Estonia)

11 September 2012
20:00 UTC+3

Israel	0–4	Russia
	Report	Kerzhakov 7', 64'; Kokorin 18'; Fayzulin 78'

Ramat Gan Stadium, Ramat Gan
Attendance: 28,131
Referee: Mark Clattenburg (England)
11 September 2012
19:45 UTC+1

Northern Ireland	1–1	Luxembourg
Shiels 14'	Report	da Mota 86'

Windsor Park, Belfast
Attendance: 10,674
Referee: Vlado Glodjović (Serbia)
11 September 2012
20:15 UTC+1

Portugal	3–0	Azerbaijan
Varela 63'; Postiga 85'; Alves 88'	Report

Estádio Municipal, Braga
Attendance: 29,971
Referee: Szymon Marciniak (Poland)

12 October 2012
19:00 UTC+4

Russia	1–0	Portugal
Kerzhakov 6'	Report

Luzhniki Stadium, Moscow
Attendance: 54,212
Referee: Viktor Kassai (Hungary)
12 October 2012
21:00 UTC+2

Luxembourg	0–6	Israel
	Report	Radi 4'; Ben Basat 12'; Hemed 27', 74', 90+1'; Melikson 61'

Stade Josy Barthel, Luxembourg City
Attendance: 2,631
Referee: Leontios Trattou (Cyprus)

16 October 2012
19:00 UTC+4

Russia	1–0	Azerbaijan
Shirokov 84' (pen.)	Report

Luzhniki Stadium, Moscow
Attendance: 15,033
Referee: Aleksandar Stavrev (Macedonia)
16 October 2012
18:00 UTC+2

Israel	3–0	Luxembourg
Hemed 13', 48'; Ben Basat 35'	Report

Ramat Gan Stadium, Ramat Gan
Attendance: 20,400
Referee: Harald Lechner (Austria)
16 October 2012
20:45 UTC+1

Portugal	1–1	Northern Ireland
Postiga 79'	Report	McGinn 30'

Estádio do Dragão, Porto
Attendance: 48,711
Referee: Thorsten Kinhöfer (Germany)

14 November 2012
19:45 UTC±0

Northern Ireland	1–1	Azerbaijan
Healy 90+6'	Report	Aliyev 5'

Windsor Park, Belfast
Attendance: 12,372
Referee: Viktor Shvetsov (Ukraine)

22 March 2013
14:45 UTC+2

Israel	3–3	Portugal
Hemed 24'; Ben Basat 40'; Gershon 70'	Report	Alves 2'; Postiga 72'; Coentrão 90+3'

Ramat Gan Stadium, Ramat Gan
Attendance: 38,600
Referee: Stéphane Lannoy (France)
22 March 2013
20:15 UTC+1

Luxembourg	0–0	Azerbaijan
	Report

Stade Josy Barthel, Luxembourg City
Attendance: 1,324
Referee: Padraigh Sutton (Republic of Ireland)

26 March 2013
21:00 UTC+4

Azerbaijan	0–2	Portugal
	Report	Alves 63'; H. Almeida 79'

Tofiq Bahramov Republican Stadium, Baku
Attendance: 24,558
Referee: Andre Marriner (England)
26 March 2013
19:45 UTC±0

Northern Ireland	0–2	Israel
	Report	Refaelov 77'; Ben Basat 84'

Windsor Park, Belfast
Attendance: 11,200
Referee: Hannes Kaasik (Estonia)

7 June 2013
21:00 UTC+5

Azerbaijan	1–1	Luxembourg
Abishov 71'	Report	Bensi 80'

Eighth Kilometer District Stadium, Baku
Attendance: 9,258
Referee: Mihaly Fabian (Hungary)
7 June 2013
20:45 UTC+1

Portugal	1–0	Russia
Postiga 9'	Report

Estádio da Luz, Lisbon
Attendance: 54,697
Referee: Damir Skomina (Slovenia)

14 August 2013 (Note: Northern Ireland v Russia was originally to be played on 22 March 2013, 19:45 local time, but was postponed to the next day, 15:00 local time, due to heavy snowfall, and was postponed again after a pitch inspection in the morning of 23 March 2013. The match was rescheduled to be played on 14 August 2013.)
19:45 UTC+1

Northern Ireland	1–0	Russia
Paterson 43'	Report

Windsor Park, Belfast
Attendance: 11,178
Referee: Tom Harald Hagen (Norway)

6 September 2013
19:30 UTC+4 (Note: Russia v Luxembourg was originally to be kicked off at 18:30 local time, but was delayed by an hour due to rain.)

Russia	4–1	Luxembourg
Kokorin 1', 36'; Kerzhakov 59'; Samedov 90+3'	Report	Joachim 90'

Central Stadium, Kazan
Attendance: 18,525
Referee: Bobby Madden (Scotland)
6 September 2013
19:45 UTC+1

Northern Ireland	2–4	Portugal
McAuley 36'; Ward 52'	Report	Alves 21'; Ronaldo 68', 77', 83'

Windsor Park, Belfast
Attendance: 13,629
Referee: Danny Makkelie (Netherlands)
7 September 2013
20:45 UTC+3

Israel	1–1	Azerbaijan
Shechter 73'	Report	Amirguliyev 61'

Ramat Gan Stadium, Ramat Gan
Attendance: 21,250
Referee: Stefan Johannesson (Sweden)

10 September 2013
19:00 UTC+4

Russia	3–1	Israel
V. Berezutski 49'; Kokorin 52'; Glushakov 74'	Report	Zahavi 90+3'

Petrovsky Stadium, Saint Petersburg
Attendance: 21,107
Referee: Manuel Gräfe (Germany)
10 September 2013
20:15 UTC+2

Luxembourg	3–2	Northern Ireland
Joachim 45+1'; Bensi 78'; Jänisch 87'	Report	Paterson 14'; McAuley 82'

Stade Josy Barthel, Luxembourg City
Attendance: 4,114
Referee: Robert Malek (Poland)

11 October 2013
21:00 UTC+5

Azerbaijan	2–0	Northern Ireland
Dadashov 58'; Shukurov 90+4'	Report

Eighth Kilometer District Stadium, Baku
Attendance: 10,100
Referee: Andrea De Marco (Italy)
11 October 2013
20:30 UTC+2

Luxembourg	0–4	Russia
	Report	Samedov 9'; Fayzulin 39'; Glushakov 45+2'; Kerzhakov 73'

Stade Josy Barthel, Luxembourg City
Attendance: 5,354
Referee: Stephan Studer (Switzerland)
11 October 2013
20:45 UTC+1

Portugal	1–1	Israel
Costa 28'	Report	Ben Basat 85'

Estádio José Alvalade, Lisbon
Attendance: 48,317
Referee: Tom Harald Hagen (Norway)

15 October 2013
22:00 UTC+5

Azerbaijan	1–1	Russia
Javadov 90'	Report	Shirokov 16'

Eighth Kilometer District Stadium, Baku
Attendance: 11,000
Referee: Milorad Mažić (Serbia)
15 October 2013
20:00 UTC+3

Israel	1–1	Northern Ireland
Ben Basat 43'	Report	Davis 72'

Ramat Gan Stadium, Ramat Gan
Attendance: 12,785
Referee: Laurent Duhamel (France)
15 October 2013
18:00 UTC+1

Portugal	3–0	Luxembourg
Varela 30'; Nani 36'; Postiga 78'	Report

Estádio Cidade de Coimbra, Coimbra
Attendance: 18,955
Referee: Bülent Yıldırım (Turkey)

== Goalscorers ==
There were 82 goals scored in 30 matches, for an average of 2.73 goals per match.

6 goals

- (Israel) Eden Ben Basat
- (Israel) Tomer Hemed
- (Portugal) Hélder Postiga

5 goals

- (Russia) Aleksandr Kerzhakov

4 goals

- (Portugal) Bruno Alves
- (Portugal) Cristiano Ronaldo
- (Russia) Aleksandr Kokorin

3 goals

- (Russia) Viktor Fayzulin
- (Russia) Roman Shirokov

2 goals

- (Azerbaijan) Ruslan Abishov
- (Luxembourg) Stefano Bensi
- (Luxembourg) Daniel da Mota
- (Luxembourg) Aurélien Joachim
- (Northern Ireland) Gareth McAuley
- (Northern Ireland) Martin Paterson
- (Portugal) Silvestre Varela
- (Russia) Denis Glushakov
- (Russia) Aleksandr Samedov

1 goal

- (Azerbaijan) Rauf Aliyev
- (Azerbaijan) Rahid Amirguliyev
- (Azerbaijan) Rufat Dadashov
- (Azerbaijan) Vagif Javadov
- (Azerbaijan) Mahir Shukurov
- (Israel) Rami Gershon
- (Israel) Maor Melikson
- (Israel) Bibras Natcho
- (Israel) Maharan Radi
- (Israel) Lior Refaelov
- (Israel) Itay Shechter
- (Israel) Eran Zahavi
- (Luxembourg) Mathias Jänisch
- (Northern Ireland) Steven Davis
- (Northern Ireland) David Healy
- (Northern Ireland) Niall McGinn
- (Northern Ireland) Dean Shiels
- (Northern Ireland) Jamie Ward
- (Portugal) Hugo Almeida
- (Portugal) Fábio Coentrão
- (Portugal) Ricardo Costa
- (Portugal) Nani
- (Russia) Vasili Berezutski

== Discipline ==
Pos	Player	Country	Booked	Sent off (straight red)	Suspended for match(es)	Reason
FW	Rauf Aliyev	Azerbaijan	3	1	vs Luxembourg (7 June 2013)	Sent off in a 2014 World Cup qualifying match
DF	Gareth McAuley	Northern Ireland	3	0	vs Portugal (16 October 2012)	Booked in two 2014 World Cup qualifying matches
GK	Kamran Agayev	Azerbaijan	2	0	vs Northern Ireland (14 November 2012)	Booked in two 2014 World Cup qualifying matches
ST	Kyle Lafferty	Northern Ireland	2	0	vs Israel (26 March 2013)	Booked in two 2014 World Cup qualifying matches
MF	Chris Baird	Northern Ireland	2	0	vs Israel (26 March 2013)	Booked in two 2014 World Cup qualifying matches
FW	Cristiano Ronaldo	Portugal	4	0	vs Azerbaijan (26 March 2013) vs Luxembourg (15 October 2013)	Booked in two 2014 World Cup qualifying matches Booked in two 2014 World Cup qualifying matches
FW	Tomer Hemed	Israel	2	0	vs Northern Ireland (26 March 2013)	Booked in two 2014 World Cup qualifying matches
DF	Mathias Jänisch	Luxembourg	2	0	vs Belgium (26 March 2013)	Booked in two 2014 World Cup qualifying matches
FW	Vüqar Nadirov	Azerbaijan	2	0	vs Luxembourg (7 June 2013)	Booked in two 2014 World Cup qualifying matches
DF	Pepe	Portugal	4	0	vs Russia (7 June 2013) vs Luxembourg (15 October 2013)	Booked in two 2014 World Cup qualifying matches Booked in two 2014 World Cup qualifying matches
MF	Chris Brunt	Northern Ireland	4	1	vs Russia (14 August 2013) vs Luxembourg (10 September 2013)	Booked in two 2014 World Cup qualifying matches Sent off in a 2014 World Cup qualifying match
ST	Branimir Subasic	Azerbaijan	0	1	vs Israel (6 September 2013)	Sent off in a 2014 World Cup qualifying match
DF	Mario Mutsch	Luxembourg	2	0	vs Russia (6 September 2013)	Booked in two 2014 World Cup qualifying matches
DF	Daniel Lafferty	Northern Ireland	2	0	vs Portugal (6 September 2013)	Booked in two 2014 World Cup qualifying matches
DF	Vasili Berezutski	Russia	2	0	vs Luxembourg (6 September 2013)	Booked in two 2014 World Cup qualifying matches
MF	Ben Payal	Luxembourg	2	0	vs Northern Ireland (10 September 2013)	Booked in two 2014 World Cup qualifying matches
ST	Kyle Lafferty	Northern Ireland	1	1	vs Luxembourg (10 September 2013)	Sent off in a 2014 World Cup qualifying match
DF	Fábio Coentrão	Portugal	2	0	vs Israel (11 October 2013)	Booked in two 2014 World Cup qualifying matches
FW	Hélder Postiga	Portugal	0	1	vs Israel (11 October 2013)	Sent off in a 2014 World Cup qualifying match
DF	Eytan Tibi	Israel	2	0	vs Russia (10 September 2013)	Booked in two 2014 World Cup qualifying matches
MF	Ruslan Abishov	Azerbaijan	2	0	vs Northern Ireland (11 October 2013)	Booked in two 2014 World Cup qualifying matches
DF	Sergey Ignashevich	Russia	2	0	vs Luxembourg (11 October 2013)	Booked in two 2014 World Cup qualifying matches
FW	Aurélien Joachim	Luxembourg	2	0	vs Russia (11 October 2013)	Booked in two 2014 World Cup qualifying matches
DF	Rasim Ramaldanov	Azerbaijan	2	0	vs Russia (15 October 2013)	Booked in two 2014 World Cup qualifying matches
MF	Oliver Norwood	Northern Ireland	2	0	vs Israel (15 October 2013)	Booked in two 2014 World Cup qualifying matches
DF	Jonny Evans	Northern Ireland	0	1	vs Israel (15 October 2013)	Sent off in a 2014 World Cup qualifying match
MF	Denis Glushakov	Russia	2	0	vs TBD (2014)	Booked in two 2014 World Cup qualifying matches
