= Stefano Bensi =

Luxembourgish footballer (born 1988)

Personal information
- Date of birth: 11 August 1988 (age 38)
- Place of birth: Schifflange, Luxembourg
- Position: Striker

Senior career*
| Years | Team | Apps | (Gls) |
| 2005–2009 | US Rumelange | 26 | (11) |
| 2009 | KMSK Deinze | 11 | (2) |
| 2009–2012 | F91 Dudelange | 57 | (27) |
| 2013–2022 | Fola Esch | 173 | (82) |

International career^{‡}
| 2008–2020 | Luxembourg | 55 | (5) |
- * Club domestic league appearances and goals as of 27 June 2023 ‡ National team caps and goals as of 18 November 2020

Stefano Bensi (born 11 August 1988) is a former Luxembourgish international footballer who last played club football for Fola Esch, as a striker.

== Personal life ==
Bensi was born in Luxembourg to an Italian father and a Luxembourgish mother.

== International career ==
=== International goals ===
Scores and results list Luxembourg's goal tally first.

| No | Date | Venue | Opponent | Score | Result | Competition |
|---|---|---|---|---|---|---|
| 1. | 7 June 2013 | Dalga Arena, Baku, Azerbaijan | Azerbaijan | 1–1 | 1–1 | 2014 FIFA World Cup qualification |
| 2. | 14 August 2013 | Stade Josy Barthel, Luxembourg City, Luxembourg | Lithuania | 2–1 | 2–1 | Friendly |
| 3. | 10 September 2013 | Stade Josy Barthel, Luxembourg City, Luxembourg | Northern Ireland | 2–1 | 3–2 | 2014 FIFA World Cup qualification |
| 4. | 9 October 2014 | Philip II Arena, Skopje, Macedonia | North Macedonia | 1–1 | 2–3 | UEFA Euro 2016 qualification |
| 5. | 18 November 2018 | Zimbru Stadium, Chișinău, Moldova | Moldova | 1–1 | 1–1 | 2018–19 UEFA Nations League D |
