= David Egbo =

Nigerian footballer

Personal information
- Date of birth: 31 October 1998 (age 28)
- Place of birth: Kaduna, Nigeria
- Height: 6 ft 1 in (1.85 m)
- Position: Forward

Youth career
- Century Soccer

College career
Years	Team	Apps	(Gls)
2017–2019	Akron Zips	56	(21)

Senior career*
Years	Team	Apps	(Gls)
2018	Black Rock FC	7	(1)
2021–2022	Vancouver Whitecaps FC	0	(0)
2021	→ Phoenix Rising (loan)	17	(5)
2022	→ Memphis 901 (loan)	18	(1)
- * Club domestic league appearances and goals as of 19 October 2022

David Egbo (born 31 October 1998) is a Nigerian footballer who plays as a forward.

== Career ==
=== Youth ===
Egbo was born and raised in Kaduna, Nigeria, before moving to the United States in 2014 on an academic scholarship to attend The Kiski School in Saltsburg, Pennsylvania. Egbo played high school soccer at Kiski, where he helped to lead the team to three straight state tournament semifinal appearances, scoring 49 goals and tallying 28 assists. He was named the Cougars' Most Valuable Player and was Gatorade High School Player of the Year for Pennsylvania in 2017. He also played club soccer with Century Soccer in Pittsburgh.

=== College and USL PDL ===
==== University of Akron ====
In 2017, Egbo attended University of Akron to play college soccer. He played three seasons with the Zips between 2017 and 2019, making 56 appearances, scoring 21 goals, and registering 13 assists. He did not play a senior season at Akron due to the COVID-19 pandemic. Egbo was recognized with a United Soccer Coaches All-America Third Team selection in 2018 and All-MAC First Team honors in his last two seasons. He also helped the Zips to MAC Tournament title and College Cup runner-up finish in 2018.

==== Black Rock FC ====
In 2018, Egbo also played in the USL PDL with Black Rock FC, making 7 appearances and netting a single goal.

=== Professional ===
==== Vancouver Whitecaps FC ====
On 21 January 2021, Egbo was selected ninth overall in the 2021 MLS SuperDraft by Vancouver Whitecaps FC. He officially signed with the club on 1 February 2021. Following the 2022 season, Egbo was released by Vancouver.

===== Phoenix Rising (loan) =====
Egbo was loaned to USL Championship side Phoenix Rising on 3 June 2021 for the rest of the season. He made his professional debut on 19 June, appearing as a 59th-minute substitute during a 2–1 loss to San Diego Loyal. He scored his first professional goal on 26 June, in a 2–1 win over Sacramento Republic.

===== Memphis 901 (loan) =====
On 24 February 2022, Egbo again moved on loan to a USL Championship club, joining Memphis 901 for the 2022 season.
