= Mathias Jänisch =

Luxembourgish international footballer (born 1990)

Personal information
- Date of birth: 27 August 1990 (age 36)
- Place of birth: Riedlingen, West Germany
- Height: 1.82 m (5 ft 11 1/2 in)
- Position: Midfielder

Youth career
- TSV Dettingen-Wallhausen
- 1995–2006: SC Bettembourg
- 2006–2007: US Hostert

Senior career*
Years	Team	Apps	(Gls)
2007–2009	CS Grevenmacher	37	(2)
2009–2019	Differdange 03	225	(21)
2020–2022	Progrès Niederkorn	32	(1)
2022–2024	UN Käerjéng	35	(2)

International career^{‡}
- Luxembourg U21
2009–2018	Luxembourg	59	(1)
- * Club domestic league appearances and goals as of 31 May 2025 ‡ National team caps and goals as of 15 November 2018

Mathias Jänisch (born 27 August 1990) is a retired Luxembourgish international footballer who played as a midfielder.

== Career ==
Born in Riedlingen, West Germany, Jänisch has played club football for CS Grevenmacher and FC Differdange 03.

He made his international debut for Luxembourg in 2009.
