= Rufat Dadashov =

Azerbaijani footballer (born 1991)

Personal information
- Full name: Rufat Oleg oglu Dadashov
- Date of birth: 29 September 1991 (age 35)
- Place of birth: Baku, Azerbaijan
- Height: 1.89 m (6 ft 2 in)
- Position: Striker

Team information
- Current team: BFC Dynamo
- Number: 9

Youth career
- SV Wehen Wiesbaden
- Mainz 05
- –2008: FV Biebrich
- 2008–2010: SV Gonsenheim

Senior career*
Years	Team	Apps	(Gls)
2010–2012	SV Gonsenheim	63	(28)
2012–2014	1. FC Kaiserslautern II	41	(5)
2014	SVN Zweibrücken	5	(2)
2014–2015	1. FC Saarbrücken	13	(1)
2015–2016	Germania Halberstadt	28	(10)
2016–2017	ZFC Meuselwitz	33	(12)
2017–2018	BFC Dynamo	25	(26)
2018–2019	Preußen Münster	51	(14)
2020–2021	Phoenix Rising	29	(15)
2021–2023	Schalke 04 II	47	(23)
2021	Schalke 04	2	(0)
2023–	BFC Dynamo	88	(39)

International career
2013–2019	Azerbaijan	24	(5)
- * Club domestic league appearances and goals as of 23 September 2026

Rufat Oleg oglu Dadashov (Azerbaijani: Rüfət Oleq oğlu Dadaşov; born 29 September 1991) is an Azerbaijani footballer who plays as a striker for Regionalliga Nordost club BFC Dynamo. He has also played for the Azerbaijan national team.

== Club career ==
Born in Baku to an Lezgin family, Dadashov has played club football in Germany for SV Wehen Wiesbaden, Mainz 05, FV Biebrich, SV Gonsenheim, 1. FC Kaiserslautern II, SVN Zweibrücken and 1. FC Saarbrucken.

In June 2016, he signed with ZFC Meuselwitz.

Dadashov played for BFC Dynamo in the Regionalliga Nordost in the 2017–18 season, where he became the league's top scorer with 25 goals.

On 5 April 2018, he signed with a two-year contract with SC Preußen Münster.

On 13 January 2020, Dadashov signed with Phoenix Rising FC of the USL Championship. In his first game with the team on 7 March 2020, he scored a hat trick in a 6–1 win over Portland Timbers 2.

In August 2021 he returned to Germany, signing with Schalke 04 II.

He made his first team debut for Schalke 04 in a 2–1 away defeat against FC St. Pauli on 4 December 2021.

Dadashov returned to BFC Dynamo on 1 July 2023.

== International career ==
Dadashov made his national team debut on 1 February 2013 against Uzbekistan in a friendly match. He scored his first goal on 29 May 2013 against Qatar in a friendly match. On 14 August 2013, he scored two goals in a friendly against Malta.

== Career statistics ==
Appearances and goals by national team and year
National team	Year	Apps	Goals
Azerbaijan	2013	10	4
Azerbaijan	2014	6	0
Azerbaijan	2015	0	0
Azerbaijan	2016	0	0
Azerbaijan	2017	0	0
Azerbaijan	2018	4	0
Azerbaijan	2019	4	1
Total		24	5

Scores and results list Azerbaijan's goal tally first, score column indicates score after each Dadashov goal.

List of international goals scored by Rufat Dadashov
No.	Date	Venue	Opponent	Score	Result	Competition
1	29 May 2013	Jassim bin Hamad Stadium, Doha, Qatar	Qatar	1–1	1–1	Friendly
2	14 August 2013	Bakcell Arena, Baku, Azerbaijan	Malta	1–0	3–0	Friendly
3	14 August 2013	Bakcell Arena, Baku, Azerbaijan	Malta	3–0	3–0	Friendly
4	11 October 2013	Bakcell Arena, Baku, Azerbaijan	Northern Ireland	1–0	2–0	2014 FIFA World Cup qualification
5	9 October 2019	Bahrain National Stadium, Riffa, Bahrain	Bahrain	1–1	3–2	Friendly

== Honors ==
=== Individual ===
- USL Championship All-League Second Team: 2020
