= 2023 Las Vegas Lights FC season =

Las Vegas Lights FC
2023 season
- Principal Owner: Brett Lashbrook
- Head coach: Isidro Sánchez
- Stadium: Cashman Field
- USL: Western Conference: 12th
- USL Cup Playoffs: DNQ
- U.S. Open Cup: Round of 32
Home colors	Away colors

The 2023 Las Vegas Lights FC season was the club's sixth season, and their sixth season in the United Soccer League Championship (USLC), the second division of American soccer.

During the offseason, the Lights underwent a coaching change after letting go of head coach Enrique Duran, hiring Isidro Sánchez, who previously coached the Lights during their inaugural season in 2018.

== Squad ==
=== Roster ===
As of June 20, 2023

No.	Pos.	Nation	Player
0	GK	USA	Marco Zuniga
1	GK	ARG	Leo Diaz (on loan from River Plate)
2	MF	GER	Pablo Soares
3	DF	USA	Zach Carroll
4	DF	USA	Lucas Stauffer
5	DF	USA	Marcelo Lage
6	MF	ESA	Alexander Romero
7	DF	USA	Issa Rayyan
9	FW	MEX	Pato Botello Faz
10	MF	USA	Justin Ingram
11	MF	USA	Azriel Gonzalez
12	FW	USA	Tyler Bagley
13	GK	USA	Andre Zuluaga
14	FW	ENG	Josh Dolling (on loan from New Mexico United)
17	MF	USA	Jacob Bushue
19	MF	ESA	Danny Ríos (on loan from Houston Dynamo)
20	MF	GHA	Eric Oteng
22	MF	USA	Andrés Jiménez
23	MF	USA	Leo Rodriguez
29	DF	VEN	Alejandro Mitrano
30	FW	USA	Andrew Carleton
33	DF	GHA	Jordan Ayimbila
45	MF	ARG	Emmanuel Ledesma
56	DF	USA	Mauricio Camanera
58	DF	USA	Aldo Carmona
88	MF	USA	Anwar Ben Rhouma Torres
99	GK	USA	Matteo Swenson
98	DF	SUI	Timothie Zali (on loan from New Mexico United)

On a USL Academy contract

=== Staff ===
Title	Name	Nation
Owner	Brett Lashbrook	United States
Head coach	Isidro Sánchez	Canada
Assistant coach	Juan Carlos García	Mexico
Performance coach	Julian Portugal	Mexico
Goalkeeping coach	Romi Gomez	Cuba

== Competitions ==
=== USL Championship ===
==== Standings ====
Pos	Team	Pld	W	L	T	GF	GA	GD	Pts	Qualification
8	New Mexico United	34	13	14	7	51	49	+2	46	Playoffs
9	Rio Grande Valley FC Toros	34	10	11	13	43	48	−5	43	
10	Oakland Roots SC	34	11	14	9	45	48	−3	42	
11	Monterey Bay FC	34	11	15	8	42	53	−11	41	
12	Las Vegas Lights FC	34	3	21	10	36	66	−30	19	

Source: USL Championship Standings
Rules for classification: 1) head-to-head points; 2) head-to-head goal differential; 3) points-per game within conference; 4) total wins; 5) total goal differential; 6) total goals scored; 7) points earned against top four Conference finishers; 8) disciplinary points; 9) coin toss or drawing of lots

==== Match results ====
On January 9, 2023, the Las Vegas Lights released their regular season schedule, with seventeen home games and seventeen away games for a 34-match season.

All times are in Pacific Standard Time.

===== March =====
March 12 1	Rio Grande Valley FC Toros	1–1	Las Vegas Lights FC	Edinburg, Texas
5:00 PM	Ruiz 45+3'; Pimentel (yellow card) 90+2' (yellow-red card) 90+2'	Report	Davila 4' (o.g.); Torres (yellow card) 89' (yellow-red card) 90+5'	Stadium: H-E-B Park; Attendance: 6,952; Referee: Matthew Corrigan

March 25 2	Orange County SC	2–2	Las Vegas Lights FC	Irvine, California
7:00 PM	Villanueva 60'; Iloski 64'	Report	Torres 44'; Botello-Faz 62'	Stadium: Championship Soccer Stadium; Attendance: 3,959; Referee: Alexis Da Silva

===== April =====
April 1 3	Indy Eleven	0–0	Las Vegas Lights FC	Indianapolis, Indiana
4:00 PM		Report		Stadium: Michael A. Carroll Stadium; Attendance: 9,091; Referee: Calin Radosav

April 15 4	Memphis 901 FC	2–2	Las Vegas Lights FC	Memphis, Tennessee
5:00 PM	Kelly 35'; Fernando 62'	Report	Stauffer 15'; Ledesma 78'	Stadium: AutoZone Park; Attendance: 3,734; Referee: Adam Kilpatrick

April 23 5	Miami FC	4–1	Las Vegas Lights FC	Miami, Florida
1:00 PM	Sorto 6'; Craig 9'; Repetto 40' (pen.); Rivas 49'	Report	Stauffer 73'	Stadium: FIU Stadium; Attendance: 1,713; Referee: Olvin Oliva

April 29 6	San Antonio FC	1–1	Las Vegas Lights FC	San Antonio, Texas
5:30 PM	Parano 42'	Report	Ingram 12'	Stadium: Toyota Field; Attendance: 7,526; Referee: Elijio Arreguin

===== May =====
May 5 7	Las Vegas Lights FC	0–1	Charleston Battery	Las Vegas, Nevada
7:30 PM		Report	Williams 59' (pen.)	Stadium: Cashman Field; Referee: Malik Badawi

May 7 8	Las Vegas Lights FC	1–2	San Antonio FC	Las Vegas, Nevada
3:00 PM	Tabortetaka 19'	Report	Adeniran 5'; Oluwaseyi 81'	Stadium: Cashman Field; Referee: John Griggs

May 13 9	Las Vegas Lights FC	1–1	FC Tulsa	Las Vegas, Nevada
7:30 PM	Botello-Faz 68' (pen.)	Report	Bird 61'	Stadium: Cashman Field; Referee: John Griggs

May 20 10	Pittsburgh Riverhounds SC	4–1	Las Vegas Lights FC	Pittsburgh, Pennsylvania
4:00 PM	Kizza 21', 31'; Ordoñez 50'; Griffin 61'	Report	Lage 86'	Stadium: Highmark Stadium; Attendance: 5,184; Referee: Austin Saini

May 26 11	Phoenix Rising FC	0–1	Las Vegas Lights FC	Phoenix, Arizona
7:30 PM		Report	Torres 78'	Stadium: Phoenix Rising Soccer Stadium; Attendance: 5,184; Referee: Gerald Flores

===== June =====
June 10 12	Las Vegas Lights FC	1–2	Monterey Bay FC	Las Vegas, Nevada
7:30 PM	Lage 58'	Report	Doner 42'; Gleadle 89'	Stadium: Cashman Field; Attendance: 2,300; Referee: Nabil Bensalah

June 14 13	El Paso Locomotive FC	2–1	Las Vegas Lights FC	El Paso, Texas
6:00 PM	Solignac 24' (pen.); McCue 32'	Report	Tabortetaka 3'	Stadium: Southwest University Park; Attendance: 6,155; Referee: Elijio Arreguin

June 17 14	Colorado Springs Switchbacks FC	2–0	Las Vegas Lights FC	Colorado Springs, Colorado
6:00 PM	Williams 37'; Foster 52'	Report		Stadium: Weidner Field; Attendance: 8,023; Referee: Alejo Calume

June 24 15	Louisville City FC	1–0	Las Vegas Lights FC	Louisville, Kentucky
5:00 PM	Mushagalusa 77'	Report		Stadium: Lynn Family Stadium; Attendance: 10,653; Referee: Melvin Rivas

===== July =====
July 1 16	Las Vegas Lights FC	1–2	Monterey Bay FC	Las Vegas, Nevada
7:30 PM	Zali 24'	Report	Jennings 14'; Williams 86'	Stadium: Cashman Field; Attendance: 2,598; Referee: Corbyn May

July 4 17	Las Vegas Lights FC	2–2	New Mexico United	Las Vegas, Nevada
6:00 PM	Botello-Faz 44'; Gonzalez 90+4'	Report	Moreno 13'; Bruce 45+1'	Stadium: Cashman Field; Attendance: 1,644; Referee: Gerald Flores

July 8 18	Las Vegas Lights FC	3–3	Birmingham Legion FC	Las Vegas, Nevada
7:30 PM	Tabortetaka 60'; Carleton 67'; Botello-Faz 90+3'	Report	Agudelo 31'; Pasher 45'; Martínez 81'	Stadium: Cashman Field; Attendance: 1,856; Referee: Brad Jensen

July 22 19	Las Vegas Lights FC	0–2	Hartford Athletic	Las Vegas, Nevada
7:30 PM		Report	Torres 23'; Edwards 81'	Stadium: Cashman Field; Attendance: 1,415; Referee: Joshua Encarnación

July 26 20	Oakland Roots SC	1–0	Las Vegas Lights FC	Hayward, California
7:00 PM	Peláez 76'	Report		Stadium: Pioneer Stadium; Attendance: 2,356; Referee: Adorae Monroy

July 29 21	Las Vegas Lights FC	1–2	Sacramento Republic FC	Las Vegas, Nevada
7:30 PM	Carleton 45+1' (pen.)	Report	Cicerone 31'; Lewis 55'	Stadium: Cashman Field; Attendance: 1,931; Referee: Chris Ruska

===== August =====
August 5 22	Las Vegas Lights FC	2–1	Rio Grande Valley FC Toros	Las Vegas, Nevada
7:30 PM	Tabortetaka 23', 37'	Report	Pimentel 90'	Stadium: Cashman Field; Attendance: 1,169; Referee: Brandon Stevis

August 12 23	Las Vegas Lights FC	0–3	Loudoun United FC	Las Vegas, Nevada
7:30 PM		Report	ElMedkhar 23'; Leggett 79'; Houssou 83'	Stadium: Cashman Field; Attendance: 2,819; Referee: Lorenzo Hernandez

August 19 24	Detroit City FC	1–0	Las Vegas Lights FC	Hamtramck, Michigan
4:30 PM	Simonsen 36'	Report		Stadium: Keyworth Stadium; Attendance: 7,181; Referee: Olvin Oliva

August 26 25	Las Vegas Lights FC	0–3	Phoenix Rising FC	Las Vegas, Nevada
7:30 PM	Rios 45+3', 61'	Report	Arteaga 53'; Trejo 81'; Armenakas 82'	Stadium: Cashman Field; Attendance: 2,720; Referee: Thomas Snyder

August 30 26	New Mexico United	3–3	Las Vegas Lights FC	Albuquerque, New Mexico
6:00 PM	Moreno 34', 76'; Seymore 89'	Report	Lage 36'; Bagley 51'; Rios 53'	Stadium: Isotopes Park; Attendance: 6,102; Referee: Austin Saini

===== September =====
September 2 27	Las Vegas Lights FC	1–5	Orange County SC	Las Vegas, Nevada
7:30 PM	Rios 69'	Report	Iloski 13'; Amang 22'; Nakkim 38'; McNulty 82'; Lankford 89'	Stadium: Cashman Field; Referee: John Matto

September 9 28	Las Vegas Lights FC	3–1	Oakland Roots SC	Las Vegas, Nevada
7:30 PM	Gonzalez 56'; Bagley 57', 89'	Report	Rodriguez 12' (pen.)	Stadium: Cashman Field; Referee: Danielle Chesky

September 13 29	Las Vegas Lights FC	0–1	El Paso Locomotive FC	Las Vegas, Nevada
7:30 PM		Report	Lyons 12'	Stadium: Cashman Field; Referee: Kevin Broadley

September 16 30	Monterey Bay FC	3–2	Las Vegas Lights FC	Seaside, California
7:00 PM	Okoli 29'; Lara 62'; Baca 74'	Report	Lage 17'; Gonzalez 18'	Stadium: Cardinale Stadium; Attendance: 4,617; Referee: Corbyn May

September 24 31	San Diego Loyal SC	1–1	Las Vegas Lights FC	San Diego, California
3:00 PM	Perez 27'	Report	Rios 16'	Stadium: Torero Stadium; Attendance: 5,107; Referee: Deshun Beard

===== October =====
October 1 32	Sacramento Republic FC	2–0	Las Vegas Lights FC	Sacramento, California
4:00 PM	Keko 57'; Archimede 79'	Report		Stadium: Heart Health Park; Attendance: 11,569; Referee: Melvin Rivas

October 7 33	Las Vegas Lights FC	2–3	Colorado Springs Switchbacks FC	Las Vegas, Nevada
7:30 PM	Bagley 48'; Stauffer 77'	Report	Henríquez 41'; Foster 57'; Williams 62' (pen.)	Stadium: Cashman Field; Referee: Austin Saini

October 14 34	Las Vegas Lights FC	0–2	San Diego Loyal SC	Las Vegas, Nevada
7:30 PM		Report	Moshobane 56'; Perez 85'	Stadium: Cashman Field; Referee: Alex Billeter

=== U.S. Open Cup ===
As a member of the USL Championship, the Las Vegas Lights entered the U.S. Open Cup in the Second Round, matched up against third-division side Los Angeles Force of the National Independent Soccer Association. After cruising to a 4–0 win at home, the Lights were matched up with top-division club Real Salt Lake of Major League Soccer. Despite being able to hold onto a 0–0 scoreline to bring the match into added extra time, the Lights ultimately lost 1–3 to Salt Lake.

April 5	Las Vegas Lights FC (USLC) (Nevada)	4–0	(California) Los Angeles Force (NISA)	Las Vegas, Nevada
7:00 PM PDT	Gonzalez 16', 23'; Ingram 37'; Torres 63'	Report		Stadium: Peter Johann Soccer Field; Attendance: 287; Referee: Brad Jensen

April 26	Las Vegas Lights FC (USLC) (Nevada)	1–3 (a.e.t.)	(Utah) Real Salt Lake (MLS)	Las Vegas, Nevada
7:00 PM PDT	Stauffer 112'	Report	Kreilach 106', 116'; Musovski 121'	Stadium: Cashman Field; Attendance: 300; Referee: Brandon Gardner
