= Leo Díaz =

Leo Díaz may refer to:

- Leo Díaz Urbina (born 1962), Puerto Rican lawyer and politician
- Leo Díaz (musician) (born 1965), Venezuelan merengue and salsa musician
- Leo Díaz (footballer) (born 2000), Argentine footballer

== See also ==
- Leonardo Díaz (disambiguation)
