= 2023 USL Championship season =

13th season of the USL Championship

USL Championship
- Season: 2023
- Dates: March 11 – October 14 (regular season); October 21 – November 12 (playoffs)
- Champions: Phoenix Rising FC (1st Title)
- Players' Shield: Pittsburgh Riverhounds SC (1st Title)
- Matches: 408
- Goals: 1,121 (2.75 per match)
- Best player: (Cameroon) Albert Dikwa Pittsburgh Riverhounds SC
- Top goalscorer: (Cameroon) Albert Dikwa Pittsburgh Riverhounds SC (20 Goals)
- Best goalkeeper: (United States) Danny Vitiello Sacramento Republic FC
- Biggest home win: 6 goals: PHX 6–0 MEM (July 1)
- Biggest away win: 7 goals: CHS 0–7 SAN (May 13)
- Highest scoring: 8 goals: MB 5–3 HFD (March 11)
- Longest winning run: 8 matches OCO
- Longest unbeaten run: 13 matches PGH
- Longest winless run: 12 matches HFD
- Longest losing run: 9 matches HFD
- Highest attendance: 20,231; SAC 0–2 OCO (August 26)
- All statistics correct as of November 12, 2023.

The 2023 USL Championship season was the 13th season of the USL Championship and the seventh season under Division II sanctioning. The 2023 season had 24 teams participating in two conferences during the regular season. San Antonio FC were the defending champions.

== Teams ==
Locations of teams for the 2023 USL Championship season
Western Conference Eastern Conference

=== Changes from 2022 ===
Joined MLS Next Pro

- Atlanta United 2
- LA Galaxy II
- New York Red Bulls II

=== Stadiums and locations ===
| Team | Stadium | Capacity |
|---|---|---|
| Birmingham Legion FC | Protective Stadium | 47,000 |
| Charleston Battery | Patriots Point Soccer Complex | 5,000 |
| Colorado Springs Switchbacks FC | Weidner Field | 8,000 |
| Detroit City FC | Keyworth Stadium | 7,933 |
| FC Tulsa | ONEOK Field | 7,833 |
| El Paso Locomotive FC | Southwest University Park | 9,500 |
| Hartford Athletic | Trinity Health Stadium | 5,500 |
| Indy Eleven | IU Michael A. Carroll Track & Soccer Stadium | 10,524 |
| Las Vegas Lights FC | Cashman Field | 9,334 |
| Loudoun United FC | Segra Field | 5,000 |
| Louisville City FC | Lynn Family Stadium | 15,304 |
| Memphis 901 FC | AutoZone Park | 10,000 |
| Miami FC | Riccardo Silva Stadium | 25,000 |
| Monterey Bay FC | Cardinale Stadium | 6,000 |
| New Mexico United | Rio Grande Credit Union Field at Isotopes Park | 13,500 |
| Oakland Roots SC | Pioneer Stadium | 5,000 |
| Orange County SC | Championship Soccer Stadium | 5,000 |
| Phoenix Rising FC | Phoenix Rising Soccer Stadium | 10,000 |
| Pittsburgh Riverhounds SC | Highmark Stadium | 5,000 |
| Rio Grande Valley FC Toros | H-E-B Park | 9,400 |
| Sacramento Republic FC | Heart Health Park | 11,569 |
| San Antonio FC | Toyota Field | 8,296 |
| San Diego Loyal SC | Torero Stadium | 6,000 |
| Tampa Bay Rowdies | Al Lang Stadium | 7,227 |

1. Non-soccer specific stadium.

=== Personnel and sponsorships ===
| Team | Head coach | Captain(s) | Kit manufacturer | Kit sponsor |
|---|---|---|---|---|
| Birmingham Legion FC | (United States) Tom Soehn | (Democratic Republic of the Congo) Phanuel Kavita | Nike | BODYARMOR (Coca-Cola) |
| Charleston Battery | (United States) Ben Pirmann | (Grenada) AJ Paterson | Hummel | Volvo |
| Colorado Springs Switchbacks FC | (Republic of Ireland) Stephen Hogan | | Capelli Sport | Centura Health |
| Detroit City FC | (England) Trevor James | (Republic of Ireland) Stephen Carroll | Adidas | Metro Detroit Area Chevrolet Dealers |
| El Paso Locomotive FC | (United States) Brian Clarhaut | (Spain) Yuma | Adidas | Southwest University at El Paso |
| FC Tulsa | (United States) Blair Gavin | (Brazil) Rodrigo da Costa | Puma | Williams |
| Hartford Athletic | (United States) Omid Namazi | (Northern Ireland) Niall Logue | Hummel | Trinity Health of New England |
| Indy Eleven | (England) Mark Lowry | (Uruguay) Sebastian Guenzatti | Puma | Honda |
| Las Vegas Lights FC | (Canada) Isidro Sánchez | (United States) Andrew Carleton | Meyba | LiUNA! |
| Loudoun United FC | (United States) Ryan Martin | (United States) Zach Ryan (United States) Cole Turner | Adidas | Betfred USA |
| Louisville City FC | (United States) Danny Cruz | (Republic of Ireland) Niall McCabe (United States) Paolo DelPiccolo | Adidas | GE Appliances |
| Memphis 901 FC | (Scotland) Stephen Glass | (Republic of Ireland) Aaron Molloy | Puma | Terminix |
| Miami FC | (United States) Lewis Neal (interim) | (England) Paco Craig | Macron | Helbiz |
| Monterey Bay FC | (Canada) Frank Yallop | (United States) Hugh Roberts | Puma | Montage Health |
| New Mexico United | (United States) Eric Quill | (United States) Sam Hamilton | Puma | Meow Wolf (home); New Mexico True (away) |
| Oakland Roots SC | (Puerto Rico) Noah Delgado | (Cameroon) Joseph Nane (United States) Tarek Morad | Meyba | Elevance Health |
| Orange County SC | (Denmark) Morten Karlsen (interim) | (Denmark) Daniel Pedersen (United States) Dillon Powers | Adidas | Hoag |
| Phoenix Rising FC | (Venezuela) Juan Guerra | (Venezuela) Manuel Arteaga (United States) Darnell King (Netherlands) Daniel Krutzen | Adidas | Carvana |
| Pittsburgh Riverhounds SC | (United States) Bob Lilley | (Jamaica) Kenardo Forbes | Adidas | Allegheny Health Network (home); 84 Lumber (away) |
| Rio Grande Valley FC Toros | (Colombia) Wílmer Cabrera | (United States) Jose Francisco Torres | Puma | Reliant |
| Sacramento Republic FC | (England) Mark Briggs | (United States) Rodrigo López | Hummel | UCDavis Health |
| San Antonio FC | (Canada) Alen Marcina | (United States) Connor Maloney (Brazil) PC | Puma | Toyota |
| San Diego Loyal SC | (United States) Nate Miller | (England) Charlie Adams | Charly | BluPeak Credit Union |
| Tampa Bay Rowdies | (England) Nicky Law | (Mexico) Aaron Guillen | Puma | DEX Imaging |

=== Managerial changes ===
| Team | Outgoing manager | Manner of departure | Date of vacancy | Incoming manager | Date of appointment |
|---|---|---|---|---|---|
| Charleston Battery | (United States) Conor Casey | Mutual separation | October 12, 2022 | (United States) Ben Pirmann | November 15, 2022 |
| El Paso Locomotive | (Malta) John Hutchinson | Mutual separation | November 15, 2022 | (United States) Brian Clarhaut | December 15, 2022 |
| Memphis 901 FC | (United States) Ben Pirmann | Hired by Charleston Battery | November 15, 2022 | (Scotland) Stephen Glass | November 22, 2022 |
| Oakland Roots SC | (Puerto Rico) Noah Delgado (Interim) | End of interim period | December 1, 2022 | (Puerto Rico) Noah Delgado | December 1, 2022 |
| San Diego Loyal SC | (United States) Landon Donovan | Moved to front office | December 2, 2022 | (United States) Nate Miller | December 2, 2022 |
| Colorado Springs Switchbacks | (United States) Brendan Burke | Hired by Houston Dynamo as assistant coach | January 13, 2023 | (Republic of Ireland) Stephen Hogan | January 18, 2023 |
| Las Vegas Lights FC | (Spain) Enrique Duran | Hired by Los Angeles FC 2 | January 25, 2023 | (Canada) Isidro Sanchez | January 25, 2023 |
| Orange County SC | (England) Richard Chaplow | Fired | May 1, 2023 | (Denmark) Morten Karlsen (interim) | May 1, 2023 |
| New Mexico United | (United States) Zach Prince | Mutual separation | June 4, 2023 | (United States) Eric Quill | June 13, 2023 |
| Miami FC | (Wales) Anthony Pulis | Mutual separation | June 20, 2023 | (United States) Lewis Neal (interim) | June 20, 2023 |
| Hartford Athletic | (United States) Tab Ramos | Fired | June 26, 2023 | (United States) Omid Namazi | June 26, 2023 |
| Tampa Bay Rowdies | (Scotland) Neill Collins | Left to manage (England) Barnsley FC | July 8, 2023 | (England) Stuart Dobson (interim) | July 8, 2023 |
| Tampa Bay Rowdies | (England) Stuart Dobson (interim) | End of interim period | July 27, 2023 | (England) Nicky Law | July 27, 2023 |

== Regular season ==
=== Format ===
The teams will play a balanced 34-game schedule. Each team will play their conference opponents twice, and play one game each with the teams in the opposite conference. The top 8 teams in each conference will make the playoffs.

=== Eastern Conference ===
| Pos | Team | Pld | W | L | T | GF | GA | GD | Pts | Qualification |
|---|---|---|---|---|---|---|---|---|---|---|
| 1 | Pittsburgh Riverhounds SC (S) | 34 | 19 | 5 | 10 | 50 | 29 | +21 | 67 | Playoffs |
| 2 | Tampa Bay Rowdies | 34 | 19 | 9 | 6 | 60 | 39 | +21 | 63 | Playoffs |
| 3 | Charleston Battery | 34 | 17 | 9 | 8 | 47 | 43 | +4 | 59 | Playoffs |
| 4 | Memphis 901 FC | 34 | 14 | 10 | 10 | 59 | 53 | +6 | 52 | Playoffs |
| 5 | Louisville City FC | 34 | 14 | 12 | 8 | 41 | 44 | −3 | 50 | Playoffs |
| 6 | Indy Eleven | 34 | 13 | 11 | 10 | 46 | 38 | +8 | 49 | Playoffs |
| 7 | Birmingham Legion FC | 34 | 14 | 16 | 4 | 44 | 53 | −9 | 46 | Playoffs |
| 8 | Detroit City FC | 34 | 11 | 15 | 8 | 30 | 39 | −9 | 41 | Playoffs |
| 9 | Miami FC | 34 | 11 | 15 | 8 | 43 | 44 | −1 | 41 | |
| 10 | FC Tulsa | 34 | 10 | 15 | 9 | 43 | 55 | −12 | 39 | |
| 11 | Loudoun United FC | 34 | 7 | 23 | 4 | 36 | 61 | −25 | 25 | |
| 12 | Hartford Athletic | 34 | 4 | 24 | 6 | 40 | 79 | −39 | 18 | |

Source: USL Championship Standings
Rules for classification: 1) head-to-head points; 2) head-to-head goal differential; 3) points-per game within conference; 4) total wins; 5) total goal differential; 6) total goals scored; 7) points earned against top four Conference finishers; 8) disciplinary points; 9) coin toss or drawing of lots
(S) Players' Shield winner

=== Western Conference ===
| Pos | Team | Pld | W | L | T | GF | GA | GD | Pts | Qualification |
|---|---|---|---|---|---|---|---|---|---|---|
| 1 | Sacramento Republic FC | 34 | 18 | 6 | 10 | 51 | 26 | +25 | 64 | Playoffs |
| 2 | Orange County SC | 34 | 17 | 11 | 6 | 46 | 39 | +7 | 57 | Playoffs |
| 3 | San Diego Loyal SC | 34 | 16 | 9 | 9 | 61 | 43 | +18 | 57 | Playoffs |
| 4 | San Antonio FC | 34 | 14 | 6 | 14 | 63 | 38 | +25 | 56 | Playoffs |
| 5 | Colorado Springs Switchbacks FC | 34 | 16 | 13 | 5 | 49 | 42 | +7 | 53 | Playoffs |
| 6 | Phoenix Rising FC (C) | 34 | 12 | 10 | 12 | 54 | 41 | +13 | 48 | Playoffs |
| 7 | El Paso Locomotive FC | 34 | 13 | 13 | 8 | 41 | 51 | −10 | 47 | Playoffs |
| 8 | New Mexico United | 34 | 13 | 14 | 7 | 51 | 49 | +2 | 46 | Playoffs |
| 9 | Rio Grande Valley FC Toros | 34 | 10 | 11 | 13 | 43 | 48 | −5 | 43 | |
| 10 | Oakland Roots SC | 34 | 11 | 14 | 9 | 45 | 48 | −3 | 42 | |
| 11 | Monterey Bay FC | 34 | 11 | 15 | 8 | 42 | 53 | −11 | 41 | |
| 12 | Las Vegas Lights FC | 34 | 3 | 21 | 10 | 36 | 66 | −30 | 19 | |

Source: USL Championship Standings
Rules for classification: 1) head-to-head points; 2) head-to-head goal differential; 3) points-per game within conference; 4) total wins; 5) total goal differential; 6) total goals scored; 7) points earned against top four Conference finishers; 8) disciplinary points; 9) coin toss or drawing of lots
(C) Champions

=== Results table ===
Color Key: Home • Away • Win • Loss • Draw
| Club | Match | | | | | | | | | | | | | | | | | | | | | | | | | | | | | | | | | |
| Club | 1 | 2 | 3 | 4 | 5 | 6 | 7 | 8 | 9 | 10 | 11 | 12 | 13 | 14 | 15 | 16 | 17 | 18 | 19 | 20 | 21 | 22 | 23 | 24 | 25 | 26 | 27 | 28 | 29 | 30 | 31 | 32 | 33 | 34 |
|---|---|---|---|---|---|---|---|---|---|---|---|---|---|---|---|---|---|---|---|---|---|---|---|---|---|---|---|---|---|---|---|---|---|---|
| Birmingham Legion FC (BHM) | PGH | TUL | HFD | TBR | PHX | LDN | OCO | HFD | MIA | OAK | PGH | ELP | DET | IND | LDN | SAN | LVL | TBR | LOU | CHS | COS | IND | SAC | LOU | TUL | DET | SDG | NMU | RGV | MEM | MIA | MEM | MB | CHS |
| Birmingham Legion FC (BHM) | 1–1 | 3–2 | 1–0 | 2–0 | 1–2 | 0–3 | 2–1 | 3–2 | 1–3 | 1–4 | 1–2 | 1–2 | 0–1 | 2–1 | 2–0 | 1–3 | 3–3 | 1–0 | 2–1 | 1–2 | 1–2 | 0–4 | 1–1 | 2–0 | 3–1 | 2–3 | 0–3 | 1–0 | 0–1 | 1–1 | 0–2 | 2–1 | 2–0 | 0–1 |
| Charleston Battery (CHS) | PHX | SAC | TBR | HFD | TBR | TUL | LOU | COS | LVL | SAN | MB | RGV | IND | DET | PGH | HFD | MEM | LDN | IND | MIA | PGH | BHM | OAK | LOU | DET | OCO | MEM | NMU | SDG | LDN | TUL | ELP | MIA | BHM |
| Charleston Battery (CHS) | 1–1 | 1–1 | 3–0 | 3–2 | 2–1 | 2–1 | 0–0 | 2–1 | 1–0 | 0–7 | 1–0 | 2–0 | 0–4 | 0–0 | 0–2 | 4–3 | 2–3 | 3–0 | 1–1 | 1–1 | 3–1 | 2–1 | 0–1 | 1–1 | 1–0 | 0–2 | 1–0 | 1–0 | 2–0 | 2–2 | 2–1 | 2–3 | 1–2 | 1–0 |
| Colorado Springs Switchbacks (COS) | ELP | HFD | SAN | LDN | PGH | SAC | NMU | CHS | ELP | MEM | IND | TBR | OAK | OCO | LVL | RGV | NMU | MIA | MB | SDG | PHX | SDG | BHM | TUL | OAK | MB | LOU | SAN | OCO | SAC | DET | RGV | LVL | PHX |
| Colorado Springs Switchbacks (COS) | 2–1 | 1–1 | 0–1 | 1–0 | 1–0 | 0–4 | 2–1 | 1–2 | 2–3 | 1–2 | 0–1 | 1–2 | 0–1 | 4–0 | 2–0 | 0–1 | 1–2 | 2–0 | 4–0 | 0–5 | 1–1 | 0–2 | 2–1 | 1–1 | 3–2 | 1–2 | 2–3 | 1–1 | 1–0 | 2–0 | 3–0 | 1–1 | 3–2 | 2–0 |
| Detroit City FC (DET) | SDG | ELP | IND | RGV | LOU | MIA | SAC | TBR | TUL | TBR | SAN | BHM | CHS | HFD | MEM | OCO | TUL | NMU | LDN | PGH | LOU | MB | OAK | CHS | LVL | BHM | MEM | MIA | PHX | HFD | COS | IND | LDN | PGH |
| Detroit City FC (DET) | 1–0 | 3–1 | 0–1 | 0–1 | 0–1 | 0–0 | 0–1 | 0–1 | 1–1 | 1–5 | 1–0 | 1–0 | 0–0 | 3–1 | 0–0 | 0–1 | 2–3 | 0–1 | 1–1 | 0–2 | 2–0 | 1–0 | 1–1 | 0–1 | 1–0 | 3–2 | 1–1 | 2–1 | 0–5 | 3–0 | 0–3 | 0–3 | 3–0 | 0–0 |
| El Paso Locomotive (ELP) | SAC | COS | DET | LOU | TUL | OCO | PGH | SDG | COS | LDN | BHM | NMU | SAN | LVL | TBR | NMU | MB | SAN | RGV | OAK | RGV | MIA | PHX | IND | HFD | MB | OCO | LVL | SAC | PHX | CHS | SDG | MEM | OAK |
| El Paso Locomotive (ELP) | 0–1 | 1–2 | 1–3 | 3–0 | 2–2 | 1–0 | 2–0 | 2–1 | 3–2 | 1–0 | 2–1 | 1–0 | 2–2 | 2–1 | 1–1 | 0–1 | 0–0 | 1–2 | 1–1 | 1–3 | 2–5 | 0–4 | 0–5 | 2–3 | 2–0 | 1–2 | 0–0 | 1–0 | 0–1 | 1–1 | 3–2 | 0–0 | 0–4 | 2–1 |
| Hartford Athletic (HFD) | MB | COS | BHM | OCO | CHS | OAK | BHM | MEM | PHX | LDN | SAC | LOU | IND | DET | CHS | IND | LDN | SDG | TUL | LVL | SAN | NMU | PGH | MIA | PGH | ELP | TBR | MEM | DET | TBR | MIA | RGV | LOU | TUL |
| Hartford Athletic (HFD) | 3–5 | 1–1 | 0–1 | 1–1 | 2–3 | 2–1 | 2–3 | 0–2 | 1–3 | 2–0 | 1–4 | 0–0 | 1–1 | 1–3 | 3–4 | 0–2 | 1–2 | 0–2 | 2–3 | 2–0 | 2–5 | 2–1 | 0–2 | 0–3 | 3–4 | 0–2 | 1–2 | 2–4 | 0–3 | 0–2 | 0–2 | 2–2 | 1–1 | 2–5 |
| Indy Eleven (IND) | TBR | DET | LVL | OAK | OCO | MB | PGH | LDN | SAC | COS | LOU | CHS | HFD | BHM | HFD | SDG | TUL | CHS | TBR | PGH | LOU | MEM | BHM | MIA | ELP | MEM | LDN | MIA | NMU | PHX | RGV | DET | TUL | SAN |
| Indy Eleven (IND) | 1–1 | 1–0 | 0–0 | 0–3 | 0–1 | 2–3 | 1–1 | 2–1 | 1–3 | 1–0 | 0–1 | 4–0 | 1–1 | 1–2 | 2–0 | 2–2 | 0–1 | 1–1 | 0–0 | 3–1 | 0–2 | 1–2 | 4–0 | 1–0 | 3–2 | 0–0 | 2–1 | 1–0 | 2–3 | 1–1 | 0–1 | 3–0 | 2–1 | 3–3 |
| Las Vegas Lights (LVL) | RGV | OCO | IND | MEM | MIA | SAN | CHS | SAN | TUL | PGH | PHX | MB | ELP | COS | LOU | TBR | NMU | BHM | HFD | OAK | SAC | RGV | LDN | DET | PHX | NMU | OCO | OAK | ELP | MB | SDG | SAC | COS | SDG |
| Las Vegas Lights (LVL) | 1–1 | 2–2 | 0–0 | 2–2 | 1–4 | 1–1 | 0–1 | 1–2 | 1–1 | 1–4 | 1–0 | 1–2 | 1–2 | 0–2 | 0–1 | 1–2 | 2–2 | 3–3 | 0–2 | 0–1 | 1–2 | 2–1 | 0–3 | 0–1 | 2–3 | 3–3 | 1–5 | 3–1 | 0–1 | 2–3 | 1–1 | 0–2 | 2–3 | 0–2 |
| Loudoun United FC (LDN) | MEM | SAN | TUL | COS | BHM | OAK | PHX | IND | ELP | NMU | HFD | PGH | MB | TUL | MIA | BHM | TBR | CHS | HFD | LOU | DET | OCO | MIA | MEM | SDG | LVL | SAC | IND | PGH | CHS | LOU | TBR | DET | RGV |
| Loudoun United FC (LDN) | 3–1 | 1–1 | 0–3 | 0–1 | 3–0 | 2–0 | 1–3 | 1–2 | 0–1 | 1–3 | 0–2 | 0–1 | 1–4 | 3–1 | 2–1 | 0–2 | 2–4 | 0–3 | 2–1 | 0–1 | 1–1 | 1–3 | 1–2 | 0~0 | 1–2 | 3–0 | 1–3 | 1–2 | 1–3 | 2–2 | 1–2 | 0–1 | 0–3 | 1–2 |
| Louisville City FC (LOU) | OCO | MB | ELP | SAC | DET | SAN | CHS | MEM | MIA | TUL | IND | HFD | MEM | PHX | LVL | PGH | LDN | PGH | DET | BHM | IND | TUL | CHS | RGV | BHM | OAK | COS | TBR | SDG | MIA | LDN | NMU | HFD | TBR |
| Louisville City FC (LOU) | 3–1 | 1–0 | 0–3 | 0–5 | 1–0 | 1–0 | 0–0 | 1–1 | 3–1 | 1–2 | 1–0 | 0–0 | 1–3 | 2–2 | 1–0 | 0–0 | 1–0 | 0–1 | 0–2 | 1–2 | 2–0 | 3–0 | 1–1 | 2–2 | 0–2 | 2–1 | 3–2 | 1–2 | 1–0 | 3–4 | 2–1 | 0–2 | 1–1 | 2–3 |
| Memphis 901 FC (MEM) | LDN | PGH | MIA | LVL | RGV | LOU | HFD | COS | TUL | MIA | LOU | DET | TUL | CHS | PHX | SAN | OAK | SAC | OCO | PGH | LDN | IND | SDG | IND | CHS | DET | TBR | MB | HFD | BHM | TBR | BHM | ELP | NMU |
| Memphis 901 FC (MEM) | 1–3 | 1–3 | 1–1 | 2–2 | 3–0 | 1–1 | 2–0 | 2–1 | 2–1 | 5–1 | 3–1 | 0–0 | 4–0 | 3–2 | 0–6 | 0–4 | 1–1 | 1–1 | 3–4 | 2–4 | 0–0 | 2–1 | 1–0 | 0–0 | 0–1 | 1–1 | 3–2 | 0–1 | 4–2 | 1–1 | 4–2 | 1–2 | 4–0 | 1–4 |
| Miami FC (MIA) | TUL | NMU | PGH | MEM | TBR | DET | LVL | OAK | BHM | LOU | SDG | OCO | MEM | RGV | LDN | MB | COS | PHX | TUL | CHS | SAN | LDN | ELP | IND | HFD | TBR | IND | DET | PGH | LOU | BHM | HFD | CHS | SAC |
| Miami FC (MIA) | 1–1 | 0–1 | 1–1 | 1–1 | 0–2 | 0–0 | 4–1 | 0–0 | 3–1 | 1–3 | 2–3 | 0–0 | 1–5 | 3–3 | 1–2 | 0–1 | 0–2 | 2–1 | 0–1 | 1–1 | 1–0 | 2–1 | 4–0 | 0–1 | 3–0 | 0–2 | 0–1 | 1–2 | 1–2 | 4–3 | 2–0 | 2–0 | 2–1 | 0–1 |
| Monterey Bay FC (MB) | HFD | LOU | RGV | SAN | NMU | PHX | IND | RGV | PGH | NMU | CHS | TUL | LDN | LVL | SAC | MIA | OCO | COS | ELP | OAK | DET | PHX | SAC | TBR | SAN | COS | ELP | MEM | LVL | SDG | OAK | SDG | BHM | OCO |
| Monterey Bay FC (MB) | 5–3 | 0–1 | 1–1 | 1–2 | 4–2 | 1–1 | 3–2 | 0–0 | 2–2 | 1–2 | 0–1 | 0–0 | 4–1 | 2–1 | 1–0 | 1–0 | 1–3 | 0–4 | 0–0 | 1–3 | 0–1 | 0–2 | 0–1 | 1–4 | 0–0 | 2–1 | 2–1 | 1–0 | 3–2 | 2–3 | 2–2 | 1–4 | 0–2 | 0–1 |
| New Mexico United (NMU) | MIA | OAK | MB | SDG | COS | OCO | RGV | MB | LDN | SAN | ELP | TBR | RGV | PHX | COS | ELP | LVL | DET | SAC | OCO | HFD | SAN | SDG | OAK | TUL | LVL | CHS | BHM | IND | SAC | PGH | LOU | PHX | MEM |
| New Mexico United (NMU) | 1–0 | 0–1 | 2–4 | 1–1 | 1–2 | 3–1 | 2–2 | 2–1 | 3–1 | 1–2 | 0–1 | 2–3 | 2–2 | 1–3 | 2–1 | 1–0 | 2–2 | 1–0 | 3–0 | 0–1 | 1–2 | 0–3 | 2–2 | 1–2 | 2–1 | 3–3 | 0–1 | 0–1 | 3–2 | 0–0 | 1–2 | 2–0 | 2–1 | 4–1 |
| Oakland Roots SC (OAK) | SAN | RGV | NMU | IND | HFD | LDN | MIA | BHM | OCO | SAC | SDG | COS | PHX | PGH | PHX | RGV | TBR | MEM | MB | ELP | LVL | DET | CHS | COS | NMU | LOU | SAC | LVL | TUL | MB | SAN | OCO | SDG | ELP |
| Oakland Roots SC (OAK) | 1–3 | 1–1 | 1–0 | 3–0 | 1–2 | 0–2 | 0–0 | 4–1 | 3–0 | 1–3 | 2–0 | 1–0 | 2–2 | 0–0 | 1–1 | 0–2 | 0–3 | 1–1 | 3–1 | 3–1 | 1–0 | 1–1 | 1–0 | 2–3 | 2–1 | 1–2 | 0–1 | 1–3 | 0–1 | 2–2 | 2–2 | 1–3 | 2–4 | 1–2 |
| Orange County SC (OCO) | LOU | TBR | LVL | HFD | ELP | IND | BHM | NMU | SDG | OAK | SAC | PHX | MIA | RGV | COS | TUL | DET | MB | RGV | LDN | MEM | NMU | SDG | PGH | CHS | SAC | LVL | ELP | COS | SAN | PHX | OAK | SAN | MB |
| Orange County SC (OCO) | 1–3 | 1–1 | 2–2 | 1–1 | 0–1 | 1–0 | 1–2 | 1–3 | 1–2 | 0–3 | 1–0 | 0–1 | 0–0 | 2–0 | 0–4 | 3–0 | 1–0 | 3–1 | 0–2 | 3–1 | 4–3 | 1–0 | 3–1 | 1–0 | 2–0 | 2–0 | 5–1 | 0–0 | 0–1 | 0–4 | 1–1 | 3–1 | 1–0 | 1–0 |
| Phoenix Rising FC (PHX) | CHS | SDG | SDG | BHM | MB | SAN | LDN | TBR | HFD | OCO | LVL | PGH | OAK | LOU | NMU | OAK | MEM | MIA | COS | SAC | MB | SAN | ELP | RGV | LVL | SAC | RGV | TUL | DET | IND | ELP | OCO | NMU | COS |
| Phoenix Rising FC (PHX) | 1–1 | 0–3 | 2–2 | 2–1 | 1–1 | 1–1 | 3–1 | 0–2 | 3–1 | 1–0 | 0–1 | 0–1 | 2–2 | 2–2 | 3–1 | 1–1 | 6–0 | 1–2 | 1–1 | 0–4 | 2–0 | 1–2 | 5–0 | 0–1 | 3–2 | 2–1 | 2–0 | 0–0 | 5–0 | 1–1 | 1–1 | 1–1 | 1–2 | 0–2 |
| Pittsburgh Riverhounds (PGH) | BHM | MEM | MIA | TUL | COS | RGV | ELP | IND | MB | BHM | LVL | LDN | PHX | CHS | OAK | SDG | LOU | SAC | LOU | DET | CHS | IND | MEM | TBR | HFD | OCO | HFD | SAN | LDN | MIA | NMU | TUL | TBR | DET |
| Pittsburgh Riverhounds (PGH) | 1–1 | 3–1 | 1–1 | 0–0 | 0–1 | 2–0 | 0–2 | 1–1 | 2–2 | 2–1 | 4–1 | 1–0 | 1–0 | 2–0 | 0–0 | 2–1 | 0–0 | 0–0 | 1–0 | 2–0 | 1–3 | 1–3 | 4–2 | 1–0 | 2–0 | 0–1 | 4–3 | 0–0 | 3–1 | 2–1 | 2–1 | 3–2 | 2–0 | 0–0 |
| Rio Grande Valley Toros (RGV) | LVL | OAK | MB | DET | PGH | MEM | MB | NMU | SDG | TBR | CHS | OCO | MIA | NMU | COS | OAK | SAC | OCO | ELP | TUL | ELP | LVL | LOU | SAN | PHX | SDG | SAN | PHX | BHM | IND | COS | HFD | SAC | LDN |
| Rio Grande Valley Toros (RGV) | 1–1 | 1–1 | 1–1 | 1–0 | 0–2 | 0–3 | 0–0 | 2–2 | 3–2 | 0–3 | 0–2 | 0–2 | 3–3 | 2–2 | 1–0 | 2–0 | 1–1 | 2–0 | 1–1 | 1–2 | 5–2 | 1–2 | 2–2 | 1–2 | 1–0 | 2–3 | 0–0 | 0–2 | 1–0 | 1–0 | 1–1 | 2–2 | 2–3 | 2–1 |
| Sacramento Republic (SAC) | ELP | CHS | SDG | LOU | SAN | COS | DET | TUL | IND | OCO | OAK | HFD | TBR | SDG | MB | SAN | RGV | PGH | MEM | NMU | PHX | LVL | MB | BHM | LDN | OCO | PHX | OAK | ELP | NMU | COS | LVL | RGV | MIA |
| Sacramento Republic (SAC) | 1–0 | 1–1 | 1–0 | 5–0 | 0–0 | 4–0 | 1–0 | 1–1 | 3–1 | 0–1 | 3–1 | 4–1 | 1–1 | 1–1 | 0–1 | 3–1 | 1–1 | 0–0 | 1–1 | 0–3 | 4–0 | 2–1 | 1–0 | 1–1 | 3–1 | 0–2 | 1–2 | 1–0 | 1–0 | 0–0 | 0–2 | 2–0 | 3–2 | 1–0 |
| San Antonio FC (SAN) | OAK | LDN | COS | MB | SAC | LOU | PHX | LVL | LVL | CHS | DET | NMU | SDG | ELP | SDG | SAC | BHM | MEM | ELP | MIA | HFD | PHX | NMU | RGV | MB | PGH | RGV | TUL | COS | TBR | OCO | OAK | OCO | IND |
| San Antonio FC (SAN) | 3–1 | 1–1 | 1–0 | 2–1 | 0–0 | 0–1 | 1–1 | 1–1 | 2–1 | 7–0 | 0–1 | 2–1 | 3–3 | 2–2 | 2–2 | 1–3 | 3–1 | 4–0 | 2–1 | 0–1 | 5–2 | 2–1 | 3–0 | 2–1 | 0–0 | 0–0 | 0–0 | 1–2 | 1–1 | 3–3 | 4–0 | 2–2 | 0–1 | 3–3 |
| San Diego Loyal (SDG) | DET | PHX | SAC | PHX | TUL | NMU | TBR | ELP | OCO | RGV | MIA | OAK | SAN | SAC | SAN | PGH | IND | HFD | COS | COS | OCO | LDN | MEM | NMU | RGV | BHM | CHS | LOU | MB | LVL | MB | ELP | OAK | LVL |
| San Diego Loyal (SDG) | 1–0 | 3–0 | 0–1 | 2–2 | 2–1 | 1–1 | 1–0 | 1–2 | 2–1 | 2–3 | 3–2 | 0–2 | 3–3 | 1–1 | 2–2 | 1–2 | 2–2 | 2–0 | 5–0 | 2–0 | 1–3 | 2–1 | 0–1 | 2–2 | 3–2 | 3–0 | 0–2 | 0–1 | 3–2 | 1–1 | 4–1 | 0–0 | 4–2 | 2–0 |
| Tampa Bay Rowdies (TBR) | IND | OCO | CHS | BHM | MIA | CHS | SDG | DET | PHX | DET | RGV | COS | SAC | NMU | ELP | LDN | LVL | OAK | BHM | IND | TUL | PGH | MB | TUL | MIA | HFD | MEM | LOU | SAN | MEM | HFD | LDN | PGH | LOU |
| Tampa Bay Rowdies (TBR) | 1–1 | 1–1 | 0–3 | 0–2 | 2–0 | 1–2 | 0–1 | 0–1 | 2–0 | 5–1 | 3–0 | 2–1 | 1–1 | 3–2 | 1–1 | 4–2 | 2–1 | 3–0 | 0–1 | 0–0 | 3–0 | 0–1 | 4–1 | 2–1 | 2–0 | 2–1 | 2–3 | 2–1 | 3–3 | 2–4 | 2–0 | 1–0 | 0–2 | 3–2 |
| FC Tulsa (TUL) | MIA | BHM | LDN | PGH | ELP | SDG | CHS | SAC | DET | LVL | MEM | LOU | MB | LDN | OCO | MEM | DET | IND | MIA | HFD | RGV | TBR | LOU | COS | TBR | BHM | NMU | SAN | PHX | OAK | CHS | PGH | IND | HFD |
| FC Tulsa (TUL) | 1–1 | 2–3 | 3–0 | 0–0 | 2–2 | 1–2 | 1–2 | 1–1 | 1–1 | 1–1 | 1–2 | 2–1 | 0–0 | 1–3 | 0–3 | 0–4 | 3–2 | 1–0 | 1–0 | 3–2 | 2–1 | 0–3 | 0–3 | 1–1 | 1–2 | 1–3 | 1–2 | 2–1 | 0–0 | 1–0 | 1–2 | 2–3 | 1–2 | 5–2 |

== Playoffs ==
=== Bracket ===
Conference Quarterfinals; October 21–22 | Conference Semifinals; October 27–28
E1 | Pittsburgh Riverhounds SC | 0
E8 | Detroit City FC | 1
E8 | Detroit City FC | 0
E5 | Louisville City FC | 4
E4 | Memphis 901 FC | 1 (4)
E5 | Louisville City FC (p) | 1 (5)
Eastern Conference
E3 | Charleston Battery | 5
E6 | Indy Eleven | 0
E3 | Charleston Battery | 2
E7 | Birmingham Legion FC | 1
E2 | Tampa Bay Rowdies | 0
E7 | Birmingham Legion FC | 3
W1 | Sacramento Republic FC | 1
W8 | New Mexico United | 0
W1 | Sacramento Republic FC | 3
W4 | San Antonio FC | 1
W4 | San Antonio FC | 1
W5 | Colorado Springs Switchbacks | 0
Western Conference
W3 | San Diego Loyal SC | 3
W6 | Phoenix Rising FC (a.e.t.) | 4
W6 | Phoenix Rising FC (a.e.t.) | 2
W2 | Orange County SC | 1
W2 | Orange County SC | 1
W7 | El Paso Locomotive FC | 0

Conference Finals; November 4
E5 | Louisville City FC | 1
E3 | Charleston Battery | 2
W1 | Sacramento Republic FC | 1
W6 | Phoenix Rising FC | 2

USL Championship Final; November 12
E3 | Charleston Battery | 1 (2)
W6 | Phoenix Rising FC (p) | 1 (3)

== Schedule ==
=== Conference Quarterfinals ===
| October 21, 2023 East | Memphis 901 FC | 1–1 (a.e.t.) (4–5 p) | Louisville City FC | Memphis, Tennessee |
| 6:30 PM EDT | Lapa 1'; Paul (yellow card) 24'; Ward (yellow card) 62'; Kissiedou (yellow card) 73'; Careaga (yellow card) 118' | Report | Lancaster 18'; Semmle (yellow card) 24'; Perez (yellow card) 90+5'; McCabe (yellow card) 117' | Stadium: AutoZone Park; Attendance: 3,587; Referee: Elton García |
| | Penalties |
| | Hyndman (penalty scored); Molloy (penalty scored); Smith (penalty scored); Careaga (penalty scored); McFadden (penalty missed) | | (penalty scored) Totsch; (penalty scored) Harris; (penalty scored) Mares; (penalty scored) McCabe; (penalty scored) Jimenez |

| October 21, 2023 East | Pittsburgh Riverhounds SC | 0–1 | Detroit City FC | Pittsburgh, Pennsylvania |
| 7:00 PM EDT | Dossantos (yellow card) 15'; Dikwa (yellow card) 52' | Report | Lewis (yellow card) 4'; Amoo-Mensah (yellow card) 38'; Rodriguez (yellow card) 52'; Gasso 78' | Stadium: Highmark Stadium; Attendance: 6,123; Referee: Sergii Demianchuk |

| October 21, 2023 East | Tampa Bay Rowdies | 0–3 | Birmingham Legion FC | St. Petersburg, Florida |
| 7:30 PM EDT | Lasso (yellow card) 39'; Jennings (yellow card) 45+1' | Report | Martínez (yellow card) 9'; Preston 41'; Nwegbo 57'; Kasim 77' | Stadium: Al Lang Stadium; Attendance: 5,249; Referee: Matthew Thompson |

| October 21, 2023 West | San Antonio FC | 1–0 | Colorado Springs Switchbacks | San Antonio, Texas |
| 8:00 PM CDT | Garcia (yellow card) 19'; Hernández 55'; PC (yellow card) 82' | Report | Tejada (yellow card) 45'; Lacroix (yellow card) 60'; Mahoney (yellow card) 78'; Musa (yellow card) 90' | Stadium: Toyota Field; Attendance: 7,304; Referee: Alexis Da Silva |

| October 21, 2023 West | Sacramento Republic FC | 1–0 | New Mexico United | Sacramento, California |
| 7:00 PM PDT | Donovan 13'; López (yellow card) 62'; Archimede (yellow card) 80' | Report | | Stadium: Heart Health Park; Attendance: 11,569; Referee: Ricardo Fierro |

| October 21, 2023 West | Orange County SC | 1–0 | El Paso Locomotive FC | Irvine, California |
| 7:30 PM PDT | Iloski 45+1'; Scott (yellow card) 87' | Report | Dollenmayer (yellow card) 29'; Sonupe (yellow card) 58'; Rose (yellow card) 75'; Petrović (yellow card) 86'; Díaz (red card) 90+3'; Calvillo (yellow card) 90+7' | Stadium: Championship Soccer Stadium; Attendance: 5,500; Referee: Natalie Simon |

| October 22, 2023 East | Charleston Battery | 5–0 | Indy Eleven | Mount Pleasant, South Carolina |
| 4:00 PM EDT | Ycaza 12' (yellow card) 90'; Williams (yellow card) 16' (goal) 37'; Rodríguez 40'; Barajas 47'; Markanich 63' | Report | Boudadi (yellow card) 57'; Vázquez (yellow card) 72'; Diz Pe (yellow card) 76'; Lindley (yellow card) 83' | Stadium: Patriots Point Soccer Complex; Attendance: 2,972; Referee: Jeremy Scheer |

| October 22, 2023 West | San Diego Loyal SC | 3–4 (a.e.t.) | Phoenix Rising FC | San Diego California |
| 7:00 PM PDT | Damus 4', 25', 90+7' (pen.); Adams (yellow card) 45+2' | Report | Armenakas 19' (pen.); Trejo 42'; Formella 51', 119'; Harvey (yellow card) 57'; Arteaga (yellow card) 87'; Traore (yellow card) 90+5'; Fuenmayor (yellow card) 97' | Stadium: Torero Stadium; Attendance: 5,671; Referee: Elvis Osmanovic |

=== Conference Semifinals ===
| October 27, 2023 West | Sacramento Republic FC | 3–1 | San Antonio FC | Sacramento, California |
| 7:30 PM PDT | Sanchez (yellow card) 22'; Cicerone 49'; Ross 69'; Viader 80'; Filipe (yellow card) 85' | Report | Taintor (yellow card) 27'; Nathan (yellow card) 74'; Oluwaseyi (yellow card) 83' (goal) 90+1' | Stadium: Heart Health Park; Attendance: 10,619; Referee: Elvis Osmanovic |

| October 28, 2023 East | Charleston Battery | 2–1 | Birmingham Legion FC | Mount Pleasant, South Carolina |
| 7:00 PM EDT | Ycaza 17'; Dodson 68' | Report | Kasim 41'; Agudelo (yellow card) 61'; Rufe (yellow card) 70'; Lopez (yellow card) 86' | Stadium: Patriots Point Soccer Complex; Attendance: 2,762; Referee: Elton Garcia |

| October 28, 2023 East | Louisville City FC | 4–0 | Detroit City FC | Louisville, Kentucky |
| 7:30 PM EDT | Lancaster 14' (pen.), 59'; Ownby 43'; Gonzalez 60' | Report | Bryant (yellow card) 14' | Stadium: Lynn Family Stadium; Attendance: 7,959; Referee: Ricardo Fierro |

| October 28, 2023 West | Orange County SC | 1–2 (a.e.t.) | Phoenix Rising FC | Irvine, California |
| 7:30 PM PDT | Amang 24'; Richards (yellow card) 51' | Report | Trejo 7'; Fuenmayor (yellow card) 103'; Uzochukwu (yellow card) 106'; Cuello 116' | Stadium: Championship Soccer Stadium; Attendance: 5,500; Referee: Calin Radosav |

=== Conference Finals ===
| November 4, 2023 East | Charleston Battery | 2–1 | Louisville City FC | Mount Pleasant, South Carolina |
| 7:30 PM EST | Rodríguez 5' (yellow card) 69'; Williams 58' (pen.); Allan (yellow card) 90+4' | Report | Ownby (yellow card) 4'; Moguel (yellow card) 83' (red card) 86'; Adams 90'; Cruz (yellow card) 90+1' | Stadium: Patriots Point Soccer Complex; Attendance: 4,438; Referee: Elvis Osmanovic |

| November 4, 2023 West | Sacramento Republic FC | 1–2 | Phoenix Rising FC | Sacramento, California |
| 7:00 PM PST | Cicerone 31'; Keko (yellow card) 71' | Report | Traore (yellow card) 17'; King (yellow card) 40'; Munjoma (yellow card) 69'; Donovan 80' (o.g.); Stenberg (yellow card) 88'; Cuello 90+2'; Harvey (yellow card) 90+6'; Formella (yellow card) 90+6' | Stadium: Heart Health Park; Attendance: 11,569; Referee: Ricardo Fierro |

=== USL Championship Final ===
November 12, 2023
7:00 PM EST

| Charleston Battery | 1–1 (a.e.t.) | Phoenix Rising FC |
|---|---|---|
| Markanich 36' | Report | Stenberg 90' |
Penalties
| Paterson (penalty scored); Williams (penalty scored); Archer (penalty missed); Allan (penalty missed); Dodson (penalty missed) | 2–3 | (penalty missed) Cuello; (penalty missed) Krutzen; (penalty scored) Zambrano; (penalty scored) Gallardo; (penalty scored) Arteaga |

Patriots Point Soccer Complex, Mount Pleasant, South Carolina
Attendance: 5,094
Referee: Elton Garcia

Championship Game MVP: (Argentina) Rocco Ríos Novo (PHX)

== Regular season statistical leaders ==
As of October 14, 2023

=== Top scorers ===
| Rank | Player | Club | Goals |
|---|---|---|---|
| 1 | (Cameroon) Albert Dikwa | Pittsburgh Riverhounds SC | 20 |
| 2 | (United States) Cal Jennings | Tampa Bay Rowdies | 19 |
| 3 | (Canada) Tani Oluwaseyi | San Antonio FC | 17 |
| 3 | (Mexico) Danny Trejo | Phoenix Rising FC | 17 |
| 5 | (United States) Milan Iloski | Orange County SC | 16 |
| 6 | (Venezuela) Manuel Arteaga | Phoenix Rising FC | 15 |
| 6 | (United States) Russell Cicerone | Sacramento Republic FC | 15 |
| 6 | (Brazil) Rodrigo da Costa | FC Tulsa / Memphis 901 FC | 15 |
| 6 | (Jamaica) Romario Williams | Colorado Springs Switchbacks | 15 |
| 10 | (Sierra Leone) Augustine Williams | Charleston Battery | 13 |

=== Hat-tricks ===
| Player | Club | Against | Result | Date |
|---|---|---|---|---|
| (United States) Alex Dixon | Monterey Bay FC | Hartford Athletic | 5–3 (H) | March 11 |
| (Cameroon) Albert Dikwa | Pittsburgh Riverhounds SC | Memphis 901 FC | 3–1 (A) | March 18 |
| (United States) Russell Cicerone | Sacramento Republic FC | Indy Eleven | 3–1 (H) | May 13 |
| (Canada) Tani Oluwaseyi | San Antonio FC | Charleston Battery | 7–0 (A) | May 13 |
| (United States) JJ Williams | Tampa Bay Rowdies | Detroit City FC | 5–1 (H) | May 13 |
| (Canada) Tani Oluwaseyi | San Antonio FC | Memphis 901 FC | 4–0 (A) | July 7 |
| (United States) Cal Jennings | Tampa Bay Rowdies | Oakland Roots SC | 3–0 (H) | July 8 |
| (Canada) Tani Oluwaseyi | San Antonio FC | Hartford Athletic | 5–2 (H) | July 29 |
| (El Salvador) Joaquin Rivas | Miami FC | Hartford Athletic | 3–0 (A) | August 19 |
| (Jamaica) Neco Brett | Birmingham Legion FC | FC Tulsa | 3–1 (A) | August 23 |
| (Brazil) Rodrigo da Costa | Memphis 901 FC | Tampa Bay Rowdies | 4–2 (A) | September 23 |
| (Haiti) Ronaldo Damus | San Diego Loyal SC | Monterey Bay FC | 4–1 (H) | September 30 |

Notes

(H) – Home team
(A) – Away team

Scored four goals.

=== Top assists ===
| Rank | Player | Club | Assists |
|---|---|---|---|
| 1 | (Jamaica) Kenardo Forbes | Pittsburgh Riverhounds SC | 10 |
| 1 | (Mexico) Jorge Hernandez | San Antonio FC | 10 |
| 3 | (Mexico) Fidel Barajas | Charleston Battery | 9 |
| 3 | (United States) Blake Bodily | San Diego Loyal SC | 9 |
| 3 | (United States) JJ Williams | Tampa Bay Rowdies | 9 |
| 6 | (Spain) Keko | Sacramento Republic FC | 8 |
| 6 | (United States) Cameron Lindley | Indy Eleven | 8 |
| 6 | (Republic of Ireland) Aaron Molloy | Memphis 901 FC | 8 |
| 9 | (Australia) Panos Armenakas | Loudoun United FC / Phoenix Rising FC | 7 |
| 9 | (United States) Marcus Epps | FC Tulsa | 7 |
| 9 | (Uruguay) Enzo Martinez | Birmingham Legion FC | 7 |
| 9 | (Canada) Tani Oluwaseyi | San Antonio FC | 7 |
| 9 | (Mexico) Danny Trejo | Phoenix Rising FC | 7 |

=== Clean sheets ===
| Rank | Player | Club | Clean sheets |
|---|---|---|---|
| 1 | (United States) Trey Muse | Charleston Battery | 12 |
| 1 | (Germany) Oliver Semmle | Louisville City FC | 12 |
| 3 | (United States) Nate Steinwascher | Detroit City FC | 11 |
| 3 | (United States) Danny Vitiello | Sacramento Republic FC | 11 |
| 5 | (United States) Benny Díaz | El Paso Locomotive | 10 |
| 5 | (Mexico) Christian Herrera | Colorado Springs Switchbacks | 10 |
| 5 | (United States) Colin Shutler | Orange County SC | 10 |
| 5 | (United States) Connor Sparrow | Tampa Bay Rowdies | 10 |
| 5 | (Jamaica) Jahmali Waite | Pittsburgh Riverhounds SC | 10 |
| 10 | (United States) Paul Blanchette | Oakland Roots SC | 9 |

== League awards ==
=== Individual awards ===
| Award | Winner | Team | Reason | Ref. |
|---|---|---|---|---|
| Golden Boot | (Cameroon) Albert Dikwa | Pittsburgh Riverhounds SC | 20 goals in 28 games | |
| Golden Glove | (United States) Danny Vitiello | Sacramento Republic FC | 11 shutouts; 0.83 goals against average; 76.2 save percentage | |
| Golden Playmaker | (Mexico) Jorge Hernandez | San Antonio FC | 10 assists | |
| Most Valuable Player | (Cameroon) Albert Dikwa | Pittsburgh Riverhounds SC | 20 goals; 33.9% conversion rate | |
| Defender of the Year | (Spain) Arturo Ordoñez | Pittsburgh Riverhounds SC | Best defense in the Eastern Conference | |
| Goalkeeper of the Year | (United States) Danny Vitiello | Sacramento Republic FC | Golden Glove winner | |
| Coach of the Year | (United States) Bob Lilley | Pittsburgh Riverhounds SC | Led team to the Players' Shield | |
| Young Player of the Year | (Mexico) Fidel Barajas | Charleston Battery | 5 goals; 11 assists in regular season & playoffs | |
| Comeback Player of the Year | (United States) Amando Moreno | New Mexico United | Came back from a torn ACL injury in 2022 | |
| Save of the Year | (Jamaica) Jahmali Waite | Pittsburgh Riverhounds SC | vs Phoenix Rising FC | |
| Goal of the Year | (El Salvador) Jairo Henriquez | Colorado Springs Switchbacks | vs Sacramento Republic FC | |

=== All-league teams ===
First team
| Goalkeeper | Defenders | Midfielders | Forwards |
|---|---|---|---|
| (United States) Danny Vitiello (SAC) | (United States) Conor Donovan (SAC) (England) Jack Gurr (SAC) (Spain) Arturo Ordoñez (PGH) | (United States) Taylor Davila (RGV) (England) Charlie Dennis (TBR) (Mexico) Jorge Hernandez (SAN) (Republic of Ireland) Aaron Molloy (MEM) | (Cameroon) Albert Dikwa (PGH) (United States) Cal Jennings (TBR) (Mexico) Danny Trejo (PHX) |

Second team
| Goalkeeper | Defenders | Midfielders | Forwards |
|---|---|---|---|
| (United States) Paul Blanchette (OAK) | (Cuba) Adrián Diz Pe (IND) (United States) Mitchell Taintor (SAN) (United States) Sean Totsch (LOU) | (Mexico) Fidel Barajas (CHS) (Jamaica) Kenardo Forbes (PGH) (United States) Cameron Lindley (COS) (Uruguay) Enzo Martinez (BHM) | (United States) Russell Cicerone (SAC) (United States) Milan Iloski (OCO) (Canada) Tani Oluwaseyi (SAN) |

=== Monthly awards ===
| Month | Player of the Month | | | Coach of the Month | | References |
| Month | Player | Club | Position | Coach | Club | References |
|---|---|---|---|---|---|---|
| March | (United States) Jordan Farr | San Antonio FC | Goalkeeper | (United States) Ben Pirmann | Charleston Battery | |
| April | (United States) Christian Volesky | Monterey Bay FC | Forward | (England) Mark Briggs | Sacramento Republic FC | |
| May | (United States) Russell Cicerone | Sacramento Republic FC | Forward | (United States) Bob Lilley | Pittsburgh Riverhounds SC | |
| June | (Venezuela) Manuel Arteaga | Phoenix Rising FC | Forward | (Scotland) Stephen Glass | Memphis 901 FC | |
| July | (Canada) Tani Oluwaseyi | San Antonio FC | Forward | (Denmark) Morten Karlsen | Orange County SC | |
| August | (Mexico) Danny Trejo | Phoenix Rising FC | Forward | (Denmark) Morten Karlsen | Orange County SC | |
| September | (United States) Cal Jennings | Tampa Bay Rowdies | Forward | (United States) Bob Lilley | Pittsburgh Riverhounds SC | |

=== Weekly awards ===
Player of the Week
| Week | Player | Club | Position | Reason | Ref. |
|---|---|---|---|---|---|
| 1 | (United States) Alex Dixon | Monterey Bay FC | Forward | Hat trick vs Hartford | |
| 2 | (Cameroon) Albert Dikwa | Pittsburgh Riverhounds SC | Forward | Hat trick vs Memphis | |
| 3 | (United States) Jordan Farr | San Antonio FC | Goalkeeper | Clean Sheet vs Colorado Springs | |
| 4 | (Jamaica) Neco Brett | Birmingham Legion FC | Forward | 2 goals vs Tampa Bay | |
| 5 | (United States) Christian Volesky | Monterey Bay FC | Forward | 2 goals, 1 assist vs New Mexico | |
| 6 | (Sierra Leone) Augustine Williams | Charleston Battery | Forward | 2 goals vs Tampa Bay | |
| 7 | (United States) Christian Volesky | Monterey Bay FC | Forward | 1 goal, 1 assist vs Indy Eleven | |
| 8 | (Uruguay) Enzo Martinez | Birmingham Legion FC | Forward | 2 goals, 1 assist vs Hartford | |
| 9 | (United States) Trey Muse | Charleston Battery | Goalkeeper | 6 save shutout vs Las Vegas | |
| 10 | (Brazil) Luiz Fernando | Memphis 901 FC | Midfielder | 2 goals vs Colorado Springs | |
| 11 | (United States) Nate Steinwascher | Detroit City FC | Goalkeeper | 3 saves, 1 assist vs San Antonio | |
| 12 | (United States) Trey Muse | Charleston Battery | Goalkeeper | 10 save shutout vs Rio Grande Valley | |
| 13 | (Haiti) Ronaldo Damus | San Diego Loyal SC | Forward | 2 goals vs San Antonio | |
| 14 | (United States) Kyle Murphy | Miami FC | Forward | 1 goal, 2 assists vs Rio Grande Valley | |
| 15 | (Philippines) Nick Markanich | Charleston Battery | Forward | 2 goals vs Hartford | |
| 16 | (United States) Cal Jennings | Tampa Bay Rowdies | Forward | 1 goal; 1 assist vs Loudoun United | |
| 17 | (United States) Phillip Goodrum | FC Tulsa | Forward | 2 goals; 1 assist vs Detroit | |
| 18 | (Canada) Tani Oluwaseyi | San Antonio FC | Forward | Hat trick vs Memphis | |
| 19 | (United States) Phillip Goodrum | FC Tulsa | Forward | 2 goals; 1 assist; GWG vs Hartford | |
| 20 | (Trinidad and Tobago) Ryan Telfer | Miami FC | Forward | GWG vs San Antonio | |
| 21 | (Canada) Tani Oluwaseyi | San Antonio FC | Forward | 4 goals vs Hartford; 3 hat tricks this season | |
| 22 | (Cameroon) Tabort Etaka Preston | Las Vegas Lights FC | Midfielder | 2 goals vs Rio Grande Valley | |
| 23 | (Mexico) Danny Trejo | Phoenix Rising FC | Forward | 2 goals; 2 assists vs El Paso | |
| 24 | (El Salvador) Joaquin Rivas | Miami FC | Forward | Hat trick vs Hartford | |
| 25 | (Jamaica) Neco Brett | Birmingham Legion FC | Forward | 4 goals in 2 games | |
| 26 | (Venezuela) Manuel Arteaga | Phoenix Rising FC | Forward | 2 goals; 1 assist in 2 games | |
| 27 | (United States) Cal Jennings | Tampa Bay Rowdies | Forward | 3 goals in 2 games | |
| 28 | (Mexico) Christian Herrera | Colorado Springs Switchbacks | Goalkeeper | 8 save shutout vs Orange County | |
| 29 | (Brazil) Rodrigo da Costa | Memphis 901 FC | Forward | Hat trick vs Tampa Bay | |
| 30 | (Haiti) Ronaldo Damus | San Diego Loyal SC | Forward | Hat trick vs Monterey Bay | |
| 31 | (El Salvador) Joaquin Rivas | Miami FC | Forward | 1 goal, 1 assist vs Charleston | |
| 32 | (United States) Cal Jennings | Tampa Bay Rowdies | Forward | 2 goals, 1 assist vs Louisville | |

Goal of the Week
| Week | Player | Club | Opponent | Ref. |
|---|---|---|---|---|
| 1 | (United States) Lamar Batista | San Antonio FC | Oakland Roots SC | |
| 2 | (Canada) Tyler Pasher | Birmingham Legion FC | FC Tulsa | |
| 3 | (Mexico) Fidel Barajas | Charleston Battery | Tampa Bay Rowdies | |
| 4 | (Philippines) Zico Bailey | San Antonio FC | Monterey Bay FC | |
| 5 | (Venezuela) Edgardo Rito | Oakland Roots SC | Indy Eleven | |
| 6 | (Argentina) Emmanuel Ledesma | Las Vegas Lights FC | Memphis 901 FC | |
| 7 | (Sweden) Petar Petrović | El Paso Locomotive FC | Pittsburgh Riverhounds SC | |
| 8 | (Ukraine) Denys Kostyshyn | El Paso Locomotive FC | San Diego Loyal SC | |
| 9 | (Canada) Tani Oluwaseyi | San Antonio FC | Las Vegas Lights FC | |
| 10 | (United States) Matthew Corcoran | Birmingham Legion FC | Pittsburgh Riverhounds SC | |
| 11 | (Norway) Skage Simonsen | Detroit City FC | San Antonio FC | |
| 12 | (El Salvador) Jairo Henriquez | Colorado Springs Switchbacks | Tampa Bay Rowdies | |
| 13 | (Canada) Rida Zouhir | San Antonio FC | New Mexico United | |
| 14 | (Colombia) Wilmer Cabrera Jr. | Rio Grande Valley FC | Miami FC | |
| 15 | (Grenada) A. J. Paterson | Charleston Battery | Hartford Athletic | |
| 16 | (United States) Cam Lindley | Indy Eleven | Hartford Athletic | |
| 17 | (United States) Eddie Munjoma | Phoenix Rising FC | Memphis 901 FC | |
| 18 | (Mexico) Jorge Hernandez | San Antonio FC | Memphis 901 FC | |
| 19 | (Canada) Rida Zouhir | San Antonio FC | El Paso Locomotive FC | |
| 20 | (United States) Alex Crognale | Birmingham Legion FC | Louisville City FC | |
| 21 | (United States) Russell Cicerone | Sacramento Republic FC | Las Vegas Lights FC | |
| 22 | (Jamaica) Neco Brett | Birmingham Legion FC | Colorado Springs Switchbacks | |
| 23 | (Canada) Rida Zouhir | San Antonio FC | New Mexico United | |
| 24 | (Canada) Rida Zouhir | San Antonio FC | Rio Grande Valley FC | |
| 25 | (Venezuela) Manuel Arteaga | Phoenix Rising FC | Las Vegas Lights FC | |
| 26 | (Mexico) Danny Trejo | Phoenix Rising FC | Rio Grande Valley FC | |
| 27 | (United States) Kalil ElMedkhar | Loudoun United FC | Pittsburgh Riverhounds SC | |
| 28 | (Brazil) Luiz Fernando | Memphis 901 FC | Hartford Athletic | |
| 29 | (El Salvador) Jairo Henriquez | Colorado Springs Switchbacks | Sacramento Republic FC | |
| 30 | (El Salvador) Joaquin Rivas | Miami FC | Hartford Athletic | |
| 31 | (United States) Adrien Perez | San Diego Loyal SC | Oakland Roots SC | |
| 32 | (El Salvador) Jairo Henriquez | Colorado Springs Switchbacks | Phoenix Rising FC | |

Save of the Week
| Week | Goalkeeper | Club | Opponent | Ref. |
|---|---|---|---|---|
| 1 | (United States) Jordan Farr | San Antonio FC | Oakland Roots SC | |
| 2 | (United States) Jordan Farr | San Antonio FC | Loudoun United FC | |
| 3 | (United States) Jordan Farr | San Antonio FC | Colorado Springs Switchbacks | |
| 4 | (Jamaica) Jahmali Waite | Pittsburgh Riverhounds SC | FC Tulsa | |
| 5 | (United States) Jordan Farr | San Antonio FC | Sacramento Republic FC | |
| 6 | (Argentina) Leo Diaz | Las Vegas Lights FC | Memphis 901 FC | |
| 7 | (Argentina) Rocco Ríos Novo | Phoenix Rising FC | San Antonio FC | |
| 8 | (Argentina) Leo Díaz | Las Vegas Lights FC | San Antonio FC | |
| 9 | (United States) Benny Díaz | El Paso Locomotive FC | Colorado Springs Switchbacks | |
| 10 | (Mexico) Richard Sánchez | Hartford Athletic | Phoenix Rising FC | |
| 11 | (United States) Connor Sparrow | Tampa Bay Rowdies | Rio Grande Valley FC | |
| 12 | (Argentina) Leo Díaz | Las Vegas Lights FC | Phoenix Rising FC | |
| 13 | (Jamaica) Jahmali Waite | Pittsburgh Riverhounds SC | Phoenix Rising FC | |
| 14 | (United States) Dane Jacomen | Loudoun United FC | FC Tulsa | |
| 15 | (Argentina) Leo Díaz | Las Vegas Lights FC | El Paso Locomotive FC | |
| 16 | (Cameroon) Antony Siaha | Monterey Bay FC | Miami FC | |
| 17 | (United States) Benny Díaz | El Paso Locomotive FC | New Mexico United | |
| 18 | (United States) Jordan Farr | San Antonio FC | Memphis 901 FC | |
| 19 | (United States) Adrian Zendejas | Miami FC | Charleston Battery | |
| 20 | (United States) Adrian Zendejas | Miami FC | San Antonio FC | |
| 21 | (United States) Joe Rice | Hartford Athletic | San Antonio FC | |
| 22 | (United States) Joe Rice | Hartford Athletic | New Mexico United | |
| 23 | (United States) Joe Rice | Hartford Athletic | Pittsburgh Riverhounds SC | |
| 24 | (United States) Joe Kuzminsky | Colorado Springs Switchbacks | Oakland Roots SC | |
| 25 | (Germany) Oliver Semmle | Louisville City FC | Oakland Roots SC | |
| 26 | (Mexico) Carlos Saldana | Sacramento Republic FC | Oakland Roots SC | |
| 27 | (United States) Ryan Shellow | Detroit City FC | Miami FC | |
| 28 | (France) Hugo Fauroux | Loudoun United FC | Charleston Battery | |
| 29 | (United States) Jake McGuire | Miami FC | Birmingham Legion FC | |
| 30 | (United States) Danny Vitiello | Sacramento Republic FC | Las Vegas Lights FC | |
| 31 | (Spain) Koke Vegas | San Diego Loyal SC | Oakland Roots SC | |
| 32 | (United States) Benny Díaz | El Paso Locomotive FC | Oakland Roots SC | |

Team of the Week
| Week | Goalkeeper | Defenders | Midfielders | Forwards | Bench | Ref. |
|---|---|---|---|---|---|---|
| **1** | (Germany) Oettl (IND) | (United States) Dia (LOU) (United States) Batista (SAN) (Tanzania) Kasanzu (SDG) (United States) Crognale (BHM) | (United States) Ryan (LDN) (France) Valot (MIA) (United States) ElMedkhar (LDN) | (United States) **Dixon** (MB) (Liberia) Saydee (HFD) (United States) Ownby (LOU) | (United States) Cicerone (SAC) (United States) Corona (SDG) (England) Craig (MIA) (United States) Mertz (PGH) (United States) Nelson (TUL) (Brazil) PC (SAN) (Venezuela) Rito (OAK) | |
| **2** | (Spain) Vegas (SDG) | (United States) Ricketts (RGV) (Mexico) Guillén (TBR) (United States) Taintor (SAN) (United States) Hogan (PGH) | (United States) Rodriguez (DET) (England) Dennis (TBR) (Venezuela) Rito (OAK) | (Cameroon) **Dikwa** (PGH) (Canada) Pasher (BHM) (United States) Lopez (SAC) | (United States) Batista (SAN) (New Zealand) Collier (SDG) (United States) Dia (LOU) (England) Gurr (SAC) (United States) Portillo (NMU) (Ivory Coast) Samaké (LDN) (United States) Steinwascher (DET) | |
| **3** | (United States) **Farr** (SAN) | (United States) Villanueva (OCO) (Colombia) Rebellón (IND) (Spain) Navarro (ELP) | (United States) Davila (RGV) (United States) Markanich (CHS) (United States) Ferri (TUL) (United States) Felipe (SAC) | (Mexico) Barajas (CHS) (United States) Epps (TUL) (United States) M. Iloski (OCO) | (Ghana) Abu (SAN) (United States) Corcoran (BHM) (United States) Díaz (ELP) (Cuba) Diz Pe (IND) (United States) Hogan (PGH) (United States) Torres (RGV) (Germany) Yosef (TUL) | |
| **4** | (Mexico) Herrera (COS) | (Canada) Levis (TUL) (England) Gurr (SAC) (United States) Sheldon (HFD) | (United States) Maloney (SAN) (Republic of Ireland) Molloy (MEM) (United States) Davila (RGV) (Nigeria) Uzochukwu (PHX) | (United States) Cicerone (SAC) (Jamaica) **Brett** (BHM) (Venezuela) Arteaga (PHX) | (Jamaica) Beckford (COS) (United States) Deric (RGV) (United States) Epps (TUL) (United States) M. Iloski (OCO) (United States) Mahoney (COS) (Cuba) Nodarse (RGV) (Argentina) Solignac (ELP) | |
| **5** | (United States) Blanchette (OAK) | (Brazil) Alves (BHM) (United States) Batista (SAN) (United States) Wynder (LOU) | (Ukraine) Kostyshyn (ELP) (Panama) Harvey (PHX) (South Africa) Mfeka (OAK) (United States) Wehan (NMU) | (England) Gleadle (MB) (United States) **Volesky** (MB) (United States) Markanich (CHS) | (United States) Antley (TBR) (United States) Díaz (ELP) (United States) Fehr (MB) (Poland) Formella (OAK) (United States) Martin (SDG) (Argentina) Solignac (ELP) (Brazil) Torres (PHX) | |
| **6** | (United States) Vitiello (SAC) | (United States) Santos (LDN) (United States) Dodson (CHS) (United States) Stauffer (LVL) | (United States) ElMedkhar (LDN) (United States) Hamilton (NMU) (Jamaica) Forbes (PGH) (United States) Polvara (CHS) | (Sierra Leone) **A. Williams** (CHS) (United States) Ryan (LDN) (United States) Markanich (CHS) | (England) Adams (SDG) (United States) Kelly (MEM) (Jamaica) Lambert (PHX) (United States) Lopez (SAC) (Ivory Coast) Samaké (LDN) (Liberia) Saydee (HFD) (Germany) Semmle (LOU) | |
| **7** | (Argentina) Novo (PHX) | (United States) G. Smith (MEM) (Mexico) Borelli (ELP) (United States) C. Smith (BHM) (United States) O'Connor-Ward (MEM) | (Australia) Armenakas (LDN) (United States) Corona (SDG) (Ivory Coast) Landry (LDN) (United States) Kelly (MEM) | (United States) Agudelo (BHM) (United States) **Volesky** (MB) | (Ghana) Asante (IND) (England) Craig (MIA) (United States) Díaz (ELP) (United States) Felipe (SAC) (El Salvador) Henriquez (COS) (Jamaica) Lambert (PHX) (Argentina) Parano (SAN) | |
| **8** | (Argentina) Díaz (LVL) | (United States) Ricketts (RGV) (Cuba) Diz Pe (IND) (Haiti) Lacroix (COS) (United States) Smith (MEM) | (England) Dennis (TBR) (Mexico) José Hernandez (PHX) (Ghana) Kasim (BHM) | (England) Dolling (NMU) (Uruguay) **Martinez** (BHM) (Liberia) Saydee (HFD) | (Venezuela) Arteaga (PHX) (England) Craig (MIA) (Scotland) Hurst (NMU) (Ukraine) Kostyshyn (ELP) (United States) Lasso (TBR) (Mexico) Rivas (NMU) (United States) Steinwascher (DET) | |
| **9** | (United States) **Muse** (CHS) | (Morocco) Boudadi (IND) (United States) Dodson (CHS) (Mexico) Borelli (ELP) | (France) Valot (MIA) (Sweden) Petrović (ELP) (England) Dennis (TBR) (United States) Spaulding (TBR) | (Cameroon) Dikwa (PGH) (United States) Adeniran (SAN) (United States) JJ Williams (TBR) | (United States) Davila (RGV) (United States) Hamid (MEM) (Ivory Coast) Kissiedou (MEM) (Uruguay) Martinez (BHM) (Grenada) Paterson (CHS) (United States) Swartz (NMU) (United States) Volesky (MB) | |
| **10** | (United States) Díaz (ELP) | (France) Garcia (SAN) (Venezuela) Fuenmayor (PHX) (United States) Totsch (LOU) | (United States) Ruiz (RGV) (Brazil) **Fernando** (MEM) (United States) Bird (TUL) (Antigua and Barbuda) Harris (TBR) | (United States) Cicerone (SAC) (Canada) Oluwaseyi (SAN) (United States) JJ Williams (TBR) | (United States) Blanchette (OAK) (United States) Coronado (RGV) (England) Dennis (TBR) (Cameroon) Dikwa (PGH) (United States) Morad (OAK) (Mexico) Trejo (PHX) (United States) O'Connor-Ward (MEM) | |
| **11** | (United States) **Steinwascher** (DET) | (United States) Fahling (PGH) (Mexico) Guillén (TBR) (United States) Amoo-Mensah (DET) | (England) Dennis (TBR) (Republic of Ireland) Molloy (MEM) (Mexico) Rodríguez (CHS) (United States) Kelly (MEM) | (Uganda) Kizza (PGH) (United States) Pickering (MEM) (Spain) Keko (SAC) | (Jamaica) Forbes (PGH) (Spain) Ordoñez (PGH) (Mexico) Rivas (NMU) (Australia) Rose (ELP) (United States) Sparrow (TBR) (United States) Spaulding (TBR) (United States) Wehan (NMU) | |
| **12** | (United States) **Muse** (CHS) | (Spain) Ordoñez (PGH) (United States) Batista (SAN) (United States) Dodson (CHS) (France) Garcia (SAN) | (United States) Rodriguez (DET) (England) Gurr (SAC) (United States) Diaz (OAK) | (Sierra Leone) A. Williams (CHS) (Colombia) Herrera (SAC) (United States) Goodrum (TUL) | (United States) Bird (TUL) (United States) Blanchette (OAK) (Colombia) Cabezas (RGV) (United States) Cicerone (SAC) (United States) Spaulding (TBR) (United States) Stauffer (LVL) (United States) JJ Williams (TBR) | |
| **13** | (United States) Nelson (TUL) | (United States) Dia (LOU) (Spain) Ordoñez (PGH) (Mexico) Borelli (ELP) | (United States) Kelly (MEM) (United States) Quinn (IND) (Republic of Ireland) Molloy (MEM) (Ukraine) Kostyshyn (ELP) | (England) Gleadle (MB) (United States) M. Iloski (OCO) (Haiti) **Damus** (SDG) | (United States) Murphy (MB) (United States) Powers (OCO) (United States) Rodriguez (OAK) (Germany) Semmle (LOU) (United States) Totsch (LOU) (United States) Volesky (MB) (Canada) Zouhir (SAN) | |
| **14** | (United States) Romig (MEM) | (Ivory Coast) Zanne (LDN) (United States) Taintor (SAN) (Canada) Doner (MB) | (El Salvador) Henriquez (COS) (England) Dennis (TBR) (United States) Skundrich (COS) (United States) Spaulding (TBR) | (United States) **Murphy** (MIA) (United States) Ryan (LDN) (Jamaica) Ro. Williams (COS) | (Scotland) Blake (IND) (Canada) Dossantos (PGH) (United States) ElMedkhar (LDN) (England) Gleadle (MB) (United States) Goodrum (TUL) (United States) Rodriguez (DET) (United States) Vitiello (SAC) | |
| **15** | (Cameroon) Siaha (MB) | (Philippines) Manley (SAN) (Sweden) McCue (ELP) (Canada) Doner (MB) | (United States) Guido (SDG) (Mexico) Rodríguez (CHS) (United States) Portillo (NMU) (El Salvador) Sorto (MIA) | (England) Morris (DET) (Philippines) **Markanich** (CHS) (Saint Vincent and the Grenadines) Edwards (HFD) | (Ghana) Asiedu (BHM) (United States) Davila (RGV) (United States) M. Iloski (OCO) (United States) Maloney (SAN) (Norway) Nakkim (OCO) (United States) Rh. Williams (DET) (United States) Zamudio (PGH) | |
| **16** | (Cameroon) Siaha (MB) | (Ghana) Osumanu (PGH) (United States) Crognale (BHM) (Trinidad and Tobago) Peters (MEM) | (United States) Felipe (SAC) (United States) Lindley (IND) (England) Gurr (SAC) (El Salvador) Moreno (NMU) | (United States) **Jennings** (TBR) (Australia) Armenakas (PHX) (United States) LaCava (TBR) | (Jamaica) Dally (MEM) (United States) Davila (RGV) (United States) M. Iloski (OCO) (Germany) Oettl (IND) (United States) Riley (SDG) (United States) Rufe (BHM) (Spain) Viader (SAC) | |
| **17** | (Mexico) Herrera (COS) | (United States) Antley (TBR) (United States) Lambe (OCO) (United States) Munjoma (PHX) | (United States) Seagrist (COS) (United States) Quinn (IND) (Panama) Harvey (PHX) (Mexico) Rodríguez (CHS) | (United States) **Goodrum** (TUL) (United States) Markanich (CHS) (Cameroon) Amang (OCO) | (Colombia) Cabrera (RGV) (United States) Davila (RGV) (Cuba) Diz Pe (IND) (Venezuela) Fuenmayor (PHX) (Venezuela) Gallardo (PHX) (Canada) Oluwaseyi (SAN) (Greece) Tabakis (NMU) | |
| **18** | (Cameroon) Siaha (MB) | (Ghana) Ackwei (RGV) (United States) Taintor (SAN) (Sweden) McCue (ELP) | (Mexico) J. Hernandez (SAN) (United States) Echevarria (COS) (United States) Ricketts (RGV) (Denmark) Dalgaard (TBR) | (Canada) **Oluwaseyi** (SAN) (United States) Jennings (TBR) (Uruguay) Martinez (BHM) | (United States) Conway (SDG) (Canada) Doner (MB) (Cameroon) Preston (LVL) (United States) Farr (SAN) (Ivory Coast) Houssou (LDN) (Canada) Pasher (BHM) (Spain) Ruxi (TUL) | |
| **19** | (United States) Muse (CHS) | (United States) DeShields (PGH) (France) Garcia (SAN) (United States) Barbir (OAK) | (United States) Perez (SDG) (Canada) Zouhir (SAN) (United States) Bodily (SDG) (Ecuador) Cedeno (OAK) | (United States) **Goodrum** (TUL) (United States) Rodriguez (OAK) (United States) Epps (TUL) | (Cameroon) Dikwa (PGH) (United States) Fahling (PGH) (Trinidad and Tobago) Gomez (SAN) (Uruguay) Martinez (BHM) (Sweden) McCue (ELP) (United States) Shutler (OCO) (Cuba) Suárez (DET) | |
| **20** | (United States) Rice (HFD) | (Colombia) Palma (CHS) (United States) Armour (TUL) (United States) Stanley (MIA) | (United States) Corcoran (BHM) (Mexico) Barajas (CHS) (El Salvador) Moreno (NMU) (Canada) Levis (DET) | (United States) Goodrum (TUL) (Trinidad and Tobago) **Telfer** (MIA) (Sierra Leone) A. Williams (CHS) | (United States) Crognale (BHM) (United States) N. Hernandez (NMU) (Scotland) McNulty (OCO) (South Africa) Mfeka (OAK) (Mexico) Rivas (NMU) (United States) Rodriguez (DET) (United States) Steinwascher (DET) | |
| **21** | (United States) Blanchette (OAK) | (United States) Jimenez (LOU) (United States) Lasso (TBR) (United States) Dodson (CHS) | (Mexico) J. Hernandez (SAN) (United States) Davila (RGV) (England) Dennis (TBR) (England) Gurr (SAC) | (Canada) **Oluwaseyi** (SAN) (United States) Cicerone (SAC) (Sierra Leone) A. Williams (CHS) | (Colombia) Cabrera (RGV) (England) Craig (MIA) (United States) Farrell (PGH) (United States) M. Iloski (OCO) (Spain) Keko (SAC) (Argentina) Novo (PHX) (Canada) Zouhir (SAN) | |
| **22** | (United States) Rice (HFD) | (United States) Jimenez (LOU) (United States) Segbers (MIA) (United States) Taintor (SAN) (United States) McGlynn (HFD) | (Cameroon) **Preston** (LVL) (Mexico) J. Hernandez (SAN) (Brazil) Cabral (MIA) | (Cameroon) Amang (OCO) (El Salvador) Rivas (MIA) (England) Lancaster (LOU) | (United States) Dia (LOU) (United States) M. Iloski (OCO) (Spain) Keko (SAC) (Republic of Ireland) Molloy (MEM) (Panama) Tejada (COS) (Jamaica) Waite (PGH) (United States) O'Connor-Ward (MEM) | |
| **23** | (United States) Jacomen (LDN) | (Colombia) Rovira (PGH) (France) Garcia (SAN) (Cuba) Diz Pe (IND) | (Canada) Zouhir (SAN) (England) Dennis (TBR) (Ghana) Asante (IND) (Colombia) Cabezas (RGV) | (Mexico) **Trejo** (PHX) (Uruguay) Guenzatti (IND) (United States) LaCava (TBR) | (United States) Bodily (SDG) (Morocco) Boudadi (IND) (Brazil) da Costa (MEM) (Spain) Ordoñez (PGH) (United States) Perez (LOU) (United States) Romig (MEM) (Germany) Yosef (TUL) | |
| **24** | (United States) Shutler (OCO) | (United States) Amoo-Mensah (DET) (United States) Colonna (NMU) (United States) Lambe (OCO) | (Jamaica) Magee (COS) (United States) Portillo (NMU) (Uruguay) Martinez (BHM) (United States) Diaz (OAK) | (El Salvador) **Rivas** (MIA) (United States) JJ Williams (TBR) (Panama) Tejada (COS) | (United States) Areman (TBR) (Mexico) C. Herrera (MB) (United States) LaGrassa (SAC) (United States) Lara (MB) (Spain) Navarro (ELP) (Nigeria) Nwegbo (BHM) (United States) Perez (SDG) | |
| **25** | (United States) Sparrow (TBR) | (United States) Jimenez (LOU) (United States) Barbir (OAK) (Colombia) Rovira (PGH) | (United States) Quinn (IND) (England) Dennis (TBR) (Australia) Armenakas (PHX) (United States) Scott (OCO) | (Jamaica) **Brett** (BHM) (South Africa) Moshobane (SDG) (England) Morris (DET) | (England) Allan (CHB) (Morocco) Boudadi (IND) (Canada) Chapman (COS) (Cameroon) Dikwa (PGH) (United States) Powers (OCO) (El Salvador) Rios (LVL) (United States) Santana (OCO) | |
| **26** | (Mexico) Saldaña (SAC) | (Norway) Doghman (OCO) (United States) Hughes (TUL) (United States) Lambe (OCO) (Morocco) Boudadi (IND) | (United States) Bird (TUL) (United States) Moguel (LOU) (United States) Martin (SDG) | (Venezuela) **Arteaga** (PHX) (Jamaica) R. Williams (COS) (United States) Epps (TUL) | (United States) Amoo-Mensah (DET) (United States) Bodily (SDG) (Spain) Gonzalez (LOU) (United States) Kelly (MEM) (Norway) Nakkim (OCO) (Argentina) Novo (PHX) (Mexico) Trejo (PHX) | |
| **27** | (Mexico) Ca. Herrera (MB) | (United States) Amoo-Mensah (DET) (United States) Dodson (CHS) (New Zealand) Musa (COS) | (Canada) Levis (TUL) (Jamaica) Forbes (PGH) (Mexico) J. Hernandez (SAN) (United States) Trager (CHS) | (Cameroon) Dikwa (PGH) (United States) **Jennings** (TBR) (United States) Bagley (LVL) | (United States) Corcoran (BHM) (Scotland) Crawford (CHS) (United States) A. Gonzalez (LVL) (United States) Kelly (MEM) (El Salvador) Rios (LVL) (Senegal) Traore (PHX) (United States) Van Oekel (BHM) | |
| **28** | (Mexico) **Ch. Herrera** (COS) | (United States) McFadden (MEM) (El Salvador) Martinez (MB) (Senegal) Traore (PHX) | (United States) ElMedkhar (LDN) (Brazil) Nathan (SAN) (United States) Griffin (PGH) (United States) N. Hernandez (NMU) | (Venezuela) Arteaga (PHX) (Liberia) Saydee (HFD) (England) Dennis (TBR) | (United States) Díaz (ELP) (Brazil) Fernando (MEM) (United States) Hegardt (LDN) (Montenegro) Klimenta (OAK) (Sweden) McCue (ELP) (Mexico) Trejo (PHX) (United States) JJ Williams (TBR) | |
| **29** | (United States) McGuire (MIA) | (United States) Farrell (PGH) (United States) Lewis (DET) (Spain) Ordoñez (PGH) | (Panama) Harvey (PHX) (United States) Davila (RGV) (Jamaica) Forbes (PGH) (Brazil) Nathan (SAN) | (Brazil) **da Costa** (MEM) (El Salvador) Rivas (MIA) (Mexico) Barajas (CHS) | (United States) Bryant (DET) (Brazil) Cabral (MIA) (United States) Gnaulati (SDG) (United States) Jennings (TBR) (United States) Mares (LOU) (United States) McFadden (MEM) (United States) Steinwascher (DET) | |
| **30** | (United States) Sparrow (TBR) | (United States) Stanley (MIA) (Cuba) Diz Pe (IND) (United States) Antley (TBR) | (Spain) Keko (SAC) (France) Valot (MIA) (El Salvador) Calvillo (ELP) (United States) Corona (SDG) | (Jamaica) R. Williams (COS) (Haiti) **Damus** (SDG) (Cameroon) Dikwa (PGH) | (Jamaica) Brett (BHM) (United States) Davila (RGV) (United States) Diaz (OAK) (United States) Lindley (IND) (El Salvador) Rivas (MIA) (Colombia) Rovira (PGH) (United States) Thomas (NMU) | |
| **31** | (United States) Steinwascher (DET) | (Brazil) Turci (MEM) (United States) G. Smith (MEM) (Republic of the Congo) Etou (PGH) | (United States) Rodriguez (DET) (Ghana) Asante (IND) (England) Gurr (SAC) (Ivory Coast) Kissiedou (MEM) | (United States) M. Iloski (OCO) (Spain) Keko (SAC) (El Salvador) **Rivas** (MIA) | (Haiti) Damus (SDG) (United States) B. Iloski (OCO) (Ghana) Kasim (BHM) (Liberia) Saydee (HFD) (United States) Stauffer (LVL) (Jamaica) Waite (PGH) (United States) O'Connor-Ward (MEM) | |
| **32** | (United States) Díaz (ELP) | (Cuba) Diz Pe (IND) (Haiti) Lacroix (COS) (United States) Amoo-Mensah (DET) | (El Salvador) Moreno (NMU) (United States) Perez (SDG) (United States) Lindley (IND) (Philippines) Bailey (NMU) | (United States) **Jennings** (TBR) (United States) Epps (TUL) (Scotland) Hurst (NMU) | (United States) Dodson (CHS) (New Zealand) Dyer (TUL) (United States) Guido (SDG) (Mexico) Ch. Herrera (COS) (United States) Markanich (CHS) (United States) Ricketts (RGV) (United States) JJ Williams (TBR) | |
**Bold** denotes Player of the Week

== Attendances ==
Sacramento Republic drew the highest average home attendance in the 2023 edition of the USL Championship.

| # | Football club | Average attendance |
|---|---|---|
| 1 | Sacramento Republic | 10,627 |
| 2 | Louisville City FC | 10,547 |
| 3 | Indy Eleven | 9,709 |
| 4 | New Mexico United | 9,619 |
| 5 | Colorado Springs Switchbacks | 7,753 |
| 6 | Phoenix Rising | 7,409 |
| 7 | San Antonio FC | 7,325 |
| 8 | El Paso Locomotive | 6,590 |
| 9 | Detroit City FC | 6,032 |
| 10 | Tampa Bay Rowdies | 5,984 |
| 11 | Birmingham Legion | 5,091 |
| 12 | Pittsburgh Riverhounds | 5,073 |
| 13 | Hartford Athletic | 4,882 |
| 14 | San Diego Loyal | 4,754 |
| 15 | Rio Grande Valley FC | 4,506 |
| 16 | Orange County SC | 4,411 |
| 17 | FC Tulsa | 4,320 |
| 18 | Monterey Bay FC | 3,963 |
| 19 | Oakland Roots | 3,894 |
| 20 | Memphis 901 | 3,344 |
| 21 | Charleston Battery | 3,113 |
| 22 | Loudoun United | 2,664 |
| 23 | Las Vegas Lights | 1,599 |
| 24 | Miami FC | 1,432 |

=== Average home attendances totals ===
Ranked from highest to lowest average attendance with total Attendance.

| Team | GP | Total | High | Low | Average |
|---|---|---|---|---|---|
| Sacramento Republic FC | 17 | 181,646 | 20,231 | 8,763 | 10,685 |
| Louisville City FC | 17 | 179,338 | 13,248 | 7,285 | 10,549 |
| Indy Eleven | 17 | 164,543 | 12,351 | 7,194 | 9,679 |
| New Mexico United | 17 | 163,518 | 11,385 | 6,102 | 9,619 |
| Colorado Springs Switchbacks FC | 17 | 132,067 | 8,023 | 6,248 | 7,769 |
| San Antonio FC | 17 | 122,222 | 8,266 | 4,706 | 7,190 |
| El Paso Locomotive FC | 17 | 112,038 | 8,411 | 5,014 | 6,590 |
| Phoenix Rising FC | 17-4 | 79,477 | 10,437 | 4,530 | 6,114* |
| Detroit City FC | 17 | 102,566 | 7,181 | 4,293 | 6,033 |
| Tampa Bay Rowdies | 17-1 | 91,218 | 7,407 | 3,534 | 5,701 |
| Pittsburgh Riverhounds SC | 17 | 86,311 | 6,107 | 2,879 | 5,077 |
| Birmingham Legion FC | 17 | 84,365 | 6,722 | 3,250 | 4,963 |
| Hartford Athletic | 17-1 | 78,724 | 6,500 | 3,030 | 4,920 |
| San Diego Loyal SC | 17 | 82,062 | 5,671 | 3,214 | 4,827 |
| Rio Grande Valley FC Toros | 17 | 77,561 | 6,952 | 2,731 | 4,562 |
| Orange County SC | 17 | 76,068 | 5,500 | 3,047 | 4,475 |
| FC Tulsa | 17 | 73,443 | 6,444 | 2,177 | 4,320 |
| Monterey Bay FC | 17 | 67,378 | 5,720 | 3,019 | 3,963 |
| Oakland Roots SC | 17 | 66,071 | 6,135 | 2,098 | 3,887 |
| Memphis 901 FC | 17 | 58,602 | 4,001 | 2,264 | 3,447 |
| Charleston Battery | 17 | 52,910 | 4,463 | 1,661 | 3,112 |
| Loudoun United FC | 17 | 45,288 | 4,389 | 1,271 | 2,664 |
| Las Vegas Lights FC | 17-8 | 18,452 | 2,819 | 1,169 | 2,050* |
| Miami FC | 17 | 24,340 | 2,235 | 1,007 | 1,432 |
| Total | 408 | 2,220,208 | 20,231 | 1,007 | 5,635 |
