= Rob Lear =

Welsh singer-songwriter

- Born: Robert Lear; Mid Glamorgan, Wales
- Origin: Wales
- Genres: Acoustic, singer-songwriter, folk rock, pop, country folk, indie rock, alternative rock, Americana, Cymru-cana
- Occupations: Singer, songwriter
- Instruments: Vocals, guitar, keyboards, ukulele, mandolin
- Years active: 1995–present
- Members: Rob Lear; Liz Mullins; Terry Payne; Tom Long
- Website: roblearmusic.com

Rob Lear is a Welsh-based singer-songwriter. He began his career as the principal songwriter and lead singer of Welsh bands Lear and the Proud Marys. An early solo performance came supporting Rue Royale on 27 January 2013 in the venue 10 Feet Tall, Cardiff.

His music has seen him tour the UK and Europe, including a residency at Liverpool’s Cavern Club, performances at Wembley Arena and playing support to Amy Wadge, Henry Priestman, Bernard Butler and Ian McCulloch. As a dedicated song-smith he has also been sought after to co-write songs from country to R&B, has co-written for UK X-Factor quarter-finalist Katie Waissel, Spanish electronic dance music artist Edge of Universe and electronic dance music trio, Lua Sonique. He has also written songs for animated films, as well as for the 2012 British motion picture musical Rain: An Original Musical (aka 'Summertime') by Tornado Independent Films Ltd., and directed by Maxine Evans.

Lear was voted the best live act while touring Scotland, during which he played in support of Mark Morriss, Dodgy, Mystery Jets, Tom Hingley, Stories, The Crocketts and Thousand Reasons.

The Rob Lear Band blends instrumentalists including Van Morrison bassist Pete Hurley, African rhythm student Liz Mullins, country music guitarist Brett Green, Back Of Beyond's drummer Tim Robinson and multi-instrumentalist Terry Payne.

== History ==
=== 2010–2012: Solo beginnings and Little Acorns and the A Million Stars: A Mini Album ===
From August 2010 to June 2011 Lear wrote and recorded a number of songs for the 2012 South Wales based film Rain: An Original Musical (aka 'Summertime') released by Tornado Independent Films Ltd. The songs included, in the Soundtrack, were "Two Steps Behind You", "We’re So Young", "The Cull-de-sac Tango" and "Fight scene theme".

Lear's first solo recording, A Million Stars, was a six track mini album/EP, the success of which resulted in the title track becoming Welsh Single of the Week on BBC Radio Wales, as featured on the Roy Noble show. Rob's second single "Little Acorns", produced by Greg Haver was also made Welsh Single of the Week on BBC Radio Wales. Following these releases Lear linked up with a unique and eclectic supporting band of musicians which added djembe, accordion, bass guitar and guitar to the live line-up.

Between February and April 2012, Lear co-wrote and recorded the songs "Air", "Everyone Everything" and "Reflections (Physics)" for the No More Silence EP by Spanish-language emo musician Alen Seed release, Modern World Studio produced by Greg Haver.

During May 2012 he teamed up with 2011 UK X Factor quarter-finalist Katie Waissel and her band The Red Velvet Lovers at Tetbury, England and co-wrote the songs "Geek Chic" and "Straight Up, Straight Laced". These songs appear on her 2020 self-titled solo album ('Geek Chic' is renamed 'Geek').

=== 2013–2015: The release of debut studio album Let It Go ===
On the back of the success of "Little Acorns" and A Million Star: A Mini Album Lear released the debut album Let It Go a further success and the release saw Lear become Welsh Artist of The Week for two consecutive weeks via BBC Radio Wales.

The success of the Let It Go release was quickly followed by appearances playing a host of shows and summer festivals alongside the likes of Seth Lakeman, Show of Hands, The Mystery Jets, Hayseed Dixie and Martin Simpson.

"If nothing happens to these songs then the record industry must have s*** in their ears" – Kingsley Ward, founder of Rockfield Studios

About recording the album Lear has said "there are some personal stories that I don't mind telling people about, like (the song) No Way Home which follows the story of my mother's grandmother's family who sold everything to leave Dublin, jump on a boat and come to Cardiff to find work. Selling up in a time when there were no benefits and taking that step looking for a better life seemed like a courageous thing to do. Others songs are personal, but in a more emphatic way where I've drawn inspiration on a situation where I've been an observer".

During May 2014, Lear provided top-line melody work and vocal recording for Ramsgate based electronic dance music artists Lua Sonique on their release of "It All", playlisted on BBC Radio One, BBC Introducing in 2015 as 'Record of The Week' in conjunction with their Lines album '.

2015 saw Lear collaborate with another electronic dance music musician, this time with Edge of Universe (aka Alen Seed) on the track "Ama La Vida" The Latin pop track featured Lear on co-writing and vocal duties, the track also featured Leo Diaz.

=== 2016–2019: The release of second studio album Motorcycle Heart ===
From his base in the Welsh valleys, 2016 saw the release of Lear's second album, Motorcycle Heart, and as with his debut album Let It Go, once again, Lear teamed up with Richard Thompson (musician)’s Grammy nominated record producer, Simon Tassano, as co-producer along with Cardiff's Ty Drwg Studio's, Frank Naughton.

The album blended all the skills and influences of Lear's band to produce 12 tracks that bridged Americana, folk, country music and pop. The songs themselves took their inspiration from Lear's experience growing up in a homestead dominated by motorcycles and motorcyclists and the unique characters and stories that flowed from them.

During 2018, 2019 and 2020, Lear provided a mixture of vocals, keyboards, synth and guitar for five tracks included in the Welsh Music Prize Album of the Year 2020 (Longlisted) 'Working To Design' by South Wales project dunkie.

Lear featured on the following dunkie tracks: "~ Introduction - So Little Time ~" (synth, Ether Pad), "The White Hole" (synth, Ether Pad/Moog), "Can A Song Save Your Life?" (synth, Ether Pad/Moog) (album version only - uncredited), "Rabbit Hole" (backing vocals, synth, electric guitar and percussion) and "I Don't Wanna Die In Minnesota {Part II}" (backing vocals, synth, electric guitar, sub bass, bass guitar, percussion and drum programming).

During 2021 he also provided synthesizer and backing vocals for the dunkie track "Choke" {featuring Mali Davies taken from their acclaimed EP "'''The Vanishing and Other Stories'''"

During January and February 2020 Lear rehearsed and made a live appearance within the "dunkie" 9-piece live line up, providing synthesiser, percussion and backing vocals duties alongside Anthony Price (acoustic guitar and lead vocals(, Terry Phillips (acoustic guitar, electric guitar and backing vocals), Adam Price (electric guitar), Dorian Richard Holmes (bass guitar, backing vocals), Charlotte Jayne Goodwin (trumpet and violin), Gareth Anthony (piano / keyboard and backing vocals), Adam Gregory (drums) and record producer Wayne Bassett (electric guitar). This formation to promote the "Working To Design" album launch, ceased prematurely due to the COVID-19 pandemic culminated with a sole live performance on Tuesday the 28th January 2020 at Fuel Rock Club, Cardiff.

=== 2022-2023 The release of third studio album Strange Days and subsequent Promotional Tour ===
On May 19, 2022, Lear released his third solo album, Strange Days. to critical acclaim, leading to the album being included in the longlisted nominations for the Welsh Music Prize Album of The Year 2022 .

== Discography ==
- A Million Stars: A Mini Album (2011)
1. "A Million Stars"
2. "Beautiful Face"
3. "Snowblind"
4. "Willow"
5. "Heaven Help"
6. "I Saw Her"
- Let It Go (2013)
1. "Never Do"
2. "Elvis"
3. "What You Do"
4. "Let It Go"
5. "Christine"
6. "Just Love"
7. "HeartStrings"
8. "Hearts on the Radio"
9. "Strange Birds"
10. "No Way Home"
11. "I Want It Back"
12. "Coming Down"
- Motorcycle Heart (2016, 1 May)
1. "Grace
2. "Look Me Up"
3. "Light of My Life"
4. "Michael"
5. "Strung Out"
6. "Didn't I"
7. "Who"
8. "Elfinman"
9. "Carry On"
10. "Too Beautiful"
11. "Beseeched"
12. "I Want You"
- Strange Days (2022, 19 May)
1. "Last Train
2. "After The Storm"
3. "Louise"
4. "Cast In Bronze"
5. "Girl On A Place"
6. "We Still"
7. "A.U.S.T.R.A.L.I.A. Ray"
8. "Strange Days"
9. "Standing Stone"
10. "3 2 Go"
11. "Sulk For Wales"
12. "Country For Sale"
