= Leonardo Díaz =

Leonardo Díaz may refer to:

- Leonardo Díaz (footballer) (born 1972), Argentine football goalkeeper
- Leonardo Díaz (parathlete) (born 1975), Paralympic athlete from Cuba
- Leo Díaz (footballer) (born 2000), Argentine footballer

== See also ==
- Leo Díaz (disambiguation)
