= Benny Díaz =

American soccer player (born 1998)

Personal information
- Full name: Benny Díaz Jáuregui
- Date of birth: December 15, 1998 (age 27)
- Place of birth: Los Angeles, California, United States
- Height: 6 ft 0 in (1.83 m)
- Position: Goalkeeper

Team information
- Current team: Juárez
- Number: 24

Senior career*
Years	Team	Apps	(Gls)
2017–2018	Sonora	0	(0)
2018–2020	Querétaro	0	(0)
2020–2024	Tijuana	5	(0)
2022	→ Oakland Roots (loan)	13	(0)
2023	→ El Paso Locomotive (loan)	35	(0)
2024	→ Juárez (loan)	4	(0)
2025–	Juárez	11	(0)

International career
2016	United States U19	1	(0)
- * Club domestic league appearances and goals as of September 9, 2026

Benny Díaz Jáuregui (born December 15, 1998) is an American professional soccer player who plays as a goalkeeper for Liga MX club Juárez.

== Club career ==
Born in Los Angeles, California in the United States, Díaz began his career with Cimarrones de Sonora before joining Liga MX club Querétaro. Prior to the 2020–21 season, Díaz signed with Tijuana. He made his professional debut for the club on April 3, 2021, against Atlas, coming on as a 60th-minute substitute as Tijuana were defeated 1–0, the goal being scored prior to Díaz coming on.

On January 18, 2023, Díaz joined El Paso Locomotive on a loan deal through the 2023 USL Championship season.

== Career statistics ==
=== Club ===
As of September 9, 2026

Appearances and goals by club, season and competition
Club	Season	League			Cup		Continental		Total	
Club	Season	Division	Apps	Goals	Apps	Goals	Apps	Goals	Apps	Goals
Tijuana	2020–21	Liga MX	3	0	—		—		3	0
Tijuana	2021–22	Liga MX	2	0	—		—		2	0
Tijuana	Total		5	0	—		—		5	0
Oakland Roots (loan)	2022	USL Championship	13	0	—		—		13	0
El Paso Locomotive (loan)	2023	USL Championship	35	0	—		—		35	0
Juárez (loan)	2023–24	Liga MX	4	0	—		—		4	0
Juárez	2024–25	Liga MX	11	0	—		—		11	0
Career total			68	0	0	0	0	0	68	0
