= Meyba =

Spanish sportswear brand

- Type: Sociedad Anónima
- Industry: Textile
- Founded: 1940; 86 years ago
- Headquarters: Barcelona, Spain
- Area served: Europe
- Products: Clothing, footwear
- Website: Meyba

Created in the 1940s, Meyba is a sports brand from Barcelona, specialised in the manufacture of sportswear and swimwear.

== History ==
This sports brand was established in Terrassa, by Josep Mestre and Joaquim Ballbé in the 1940s, with its name coming from the founders' initial syllables.

After years of successfully creating shorts, shirts and shoes for the popular beaches of Barceloneta, it was not until 1981 that Meyba became internationally known by signing an agreement with FC Barcelona to provide sports and leisurewear. During the 10 years that FC Barcelona wore Meyba apparel, the team won many prizes and honors. The team, composed of players such as Michael Laudrup, Ronald Koeman, José Mari Bakero and Pep Guardiola, has been known as "the Dreamteam V1".

However, in 1994, the company fell into receivership, leading to its closure in 1997. It was then acquired by Pulligan Group, owned by Joan Canals. In 2013, the brand rights were acquired by the Dutch brand Premium, which manages the brand rights of Johann Cruyff.

== Sponsorship ==
=== Football ===
==== National teams ====
- Guyana (From 2025/26 season)

==== Club teams ====
- (Catalonia) Bosc de Tosca
- (Catalonia) Júpiter
- (Catalonia) Lleida
- (Catalonia) Sant Andreu
- (England) Hartlepool United F.C. (from 2025/26 season)
- (England) Leverstock Green
- (England) Margate F.C. (from 2025/26 season)
- (England) Leyton Orient (from 2026/27 season)
- (England) Scunthorpe United F.C. (from 2025/26 season)
- (Gibraltar) Glacis United
- (Japan) Fukuyama City FC (from 2025/26 season)
- (Spain) Cádiz CF
- (Spain) SD Ibiza
- (Netherlands) Willem II (from 2026/27 season)
- (United States) San Francisco City FC

==== Associations and Domestic Leagues ====
- (England) Trafford Monday Night League (from 2024/25 season)

=== Former sponsorships ===
==== Basketball clubs ====
- (Spain) FC Barcelona Regal
- (Spain) FC Martinenc
- (Spain) RCD Espanyol

==== Football former regional teams ====
- Catalonia

==== Football club ====
- (Albania) KS Besëlidhja Lezhë
- FC Andorra
- (Catalonia) Gavà (Until 1995/96 season)
- (Netherlands) FC Twente (Until 2022/23 season)
- (Paraguay) Cerro Porteño
- (Spain) Atlético de Madrid
- (Spain) CA Osasuna
- (Spain) Cádiz CF
- (Spain) CE Sabadell FC
- (Spain) FC Barcelona
- (Spain) Rayo Vallecano
- (Spain) RC Celta de Vigo
- (Spain) RCD Espanyol
- (Spain) Real Betis Balompié
- (Spain) Real Oviedo
- (Spain) Racing de Santander
- (Spain) Real Murcia
- (Spain) Real Valladolid
- (Spain) SD Eibar
- (Spain) UD Alzira
- (Spain) UE Lleida
- (United States) Las Vegas Lights (Until 2022/23 season)
- (United States) Oakland Roots (Until 2023/24 season)
- (United States) Oakland Soul (Until 2023/24 season)
- (United States) Project 51O (Until 2023/24 season)
