= Timothie Zali =

Swiss footballer (born 1998)

Personal information
- Full name: Timothie Vinson Zali
- Date of birth: January 23, 1998 (age 28)
- Place of birth: Yverdon-les-Bains, Switzerland
- Height: 1.93 m (6 ft 4 in)
- Position: Defender

Youth career
- –2017: Team Vaud

Senior career*
Years	Team	Apps	(Gls)
2017–2021	Bavois	65	(3)
2018	→ Azzurri LS 90 (loan)	7	(0)
2021–2022	Rapperswil-Jona	15	(3)
2022–2023	Wil	19	(1)
2023	New Mexico United	0	(0)
2023	→ Las Vegas Lights (loan)	22	(1)
- * Club domestic league appearances and goals as of 21 October 2023

Timothie Vinson Zali (born 23 January 1998) is a professional footballer who plays as a defender.

== Club career ==
Zali was born in Switzerland and is of Iranian and Malagasy descent. On 26 December 2022, it was announced that Zali would join USL Championship side New Mexico United ahead of their 2023 season. This followed several seasons in his native Switzerland where Zali had played for sides across multiple divisions including spells at Bavois, Azzurri LS 90, Rapperswil-Jona and Wil. On 4 May 2023, Zali was loaned to USL Championship side Las Vegas Lights for the remainder of the 2023 season.
