= Leo Díaz (musician) =

Venezuelan singer

- Born: April 9, 1965 (age 61); Maracaibo, Zulia, Venezuela
- Genres: Merengue; salsa
- Occupation: Singer
- Instruments: Vocals; accordion
- Years active: 1980s–1998
- Labels: Sonográfica; Palma Pro; Velvet

Leobaldo José Díaz (born April 9, 1965), known professionally as Leo Díaz, is a Venezuelan former merengue and salsa singer.

== Life and career ==
Leo Díaz began his professional music career as a singer in Wilfrido Vargas' band during the 1980s, where he became known for his vocal performance of the song "Salvame" on the 1987 album La Música.

In 1989, Díaz went solo and launched his debut album Wilfrido Vargas Presenta a Leo Díaz: La Nueva Sensación del Merengue, which was produced by Vargas. The album was later reissued under the title Por Retenerte that same year. The first track on the album, "El Moreno Esta", helped launch the career of Larry Martínez, who would later adopt the stage name "El Moreno Michael" following his impersonation of singer Michael Jackson while performing the song with Díaz's band during a broadcast of Venezuelan variety show Sábado Sensacional that same year.

Díaz produced and recorded his second album Mi Sueño in 1990, which marked his transition to the salsa genre. The single "La Loca", which became one of his signature songs, was released that same year on Invasión de Merengue, a compilation album that featured other artists of the merengue genre from that time. Díaz's self-titled 1991 album contains one of his best known songs, "Te Vas y Vuelves".

Díaz's son, then known publicly as Leito Díaz ("Little Leo Díaz"), often performed alongside him during his concerts as early as 1987. Both have recorded a duet album that was released in 1995. The younger Díaz eventually launched his own music career, becoming known as Leo José.

After a brief hiatus, Díaz released his final album, El Regreso, in 1997 before ultimately being forced to retire the following year.

In 2021, Díaz reunited with El Moreno Michael for a re-creation of the iconic "El Moreno Esta" performance from 1989.

In June of 2022, Díaz made a surprise appearance during his son's performance on El Show del Mediodía con Leonardo Villalobos, marking his first television appearance in more than 20 years.

== Personal life ==
=== Marriage and family ===
Díaz was married to singer Dalinda Villalobos from the 1980s until her death on June 2, 2020. Their son, known professionally as Leo José, is also a singer and has performed alongside his father at various times since he was three years old.

=== Shooting incident and retirement from music ===
Díaz's job with the Venezuelan DEA ultimately made him a target of drug traffickers at the height of his music career. In March 1998, Díaz was shot outside his home in Zulia and spent years in physical therapy in order to fully recover, which affected his ability to perform. Aside from occasional guest appearances alongside Wilfrido Vargas' band in recent years, Díaz has not recorded any new songs nor performed any stand-alone concerts since the incident.

== Discography ==
=== Contributing artist ===
- 1987: La Música (with Wilfrido Vargas)

=== Studio albums ===
- 1989: Wilfrido Vargas Presenta a Leo Díaz: La Nueva Sensación del Merengue
- 1990: Mi Sueño
- 1991: Leo Díaz
- 1995: Leo Díaz y Leito Díaz
- 1997: El Regreso

=== Reissue albums ===
- 1989: Por Retenerte (reissue of Wilfrido Vargas Presenta a Leo Díaz: La Nueva Sensación del Merengue)
