= Tyler Bagley =

American soccer player (born 1999)

Personal information
- Full name: Tyler James Bagley
- Date of birth: June 2, 1999 (age 27)
- Place of birth: San Clemente, California, United States
- Height: 1.68 m (5 ft 6 in)
- Positions: Defender; midfielder; forward

Youth career
- 2015–2017: Irvine Strikers

College career
Years	Team	Apps	(Gls)
2017–2021	Cornell Big Red	65	(17)

Senior career*
Years	Team	Apps	(Gls)
2019	Rochester Lancers	8	(1)
2021	Boston Bolts	12	(12)
2022	Inter Miami II	15	(2)
2023	Las Vegas Lights	33	(4)
- * Club domestic league appearances and goals as of October 21, 2023

Tyler James Bagley (born June 2, 1999) is an American professional soccer player who plays as an attacking midfielder.

== Career ==
=== Youth and college ===
Bagley attended San Clemente High School, whilst also playing club soccer for U.S. Soccer Development Academy side Irvine Strikers.

In 2017, Bagley attended Cornell University to play college soccer. In five years with Big Red, including a cancelled 2020 season due to the COVID-19 pandemic, Bagley made 65 appearances, scoring 17 goals and tallying 15 assists. In 2021, he was named first-team All-Ivy League and first-team Northeast all-region.

While at college, Bagley also played in the National Premier Soccer League with Rochester Lancers in 2019, making eight appearances and scoring a single goal. In 2021, he was part of the Boston Bolts team competing in the USL League Two, scoring 12 goals in as many regular season games, getting named to the 2021 USL2 All-League Team of the Year.

=== Professional ===
On January 11, 2022, Bagley was selected 54th overall in the 2022 MLS SuperDraft by Inter Miami CF. On February 24, 2022, he was named to the club's MLS Next Pro roster for the 2022 season. In his debut professional season, he scored two goals in 15 appearances for Inter Miami II.

On February 28, 2023, Bagley signed with USL Championship side Las Vegas Lights.
