= Leo Díaz (footballer) =

Argentine footballer (born 2000)

Personal information
- Full name: Alan Leonardo Díaz
- Date of birth: 27 January 2000 (age 26)
- Place of birth: Lanús, Argentina
- Height: 1.81 m (5 ft 11 in)
- Position: Goalkeeper

Team information
- Current team: Nueva Chicago
- Number: 12

Youth career
- 2006–2007: Ateneo de Lanús
- 2007–2021: River Plate

Senior career*
Years	Team	Apps	(Gls)
2021–2023	River Plate	1	(0)
2023	→ Las Vegas Lights (loan)	29	(0)
2024–	Nueva Chicago	0	(0)
- * Club domestic league appearances and goals as of 17:49, 19 June 2025 (UTC) ‡ National team caps and goals as of 09:12, 17 February 2021 (UTC)

Alan Leonardo "Leo" Díaz (born 27 January 2000) is an Argentine professional footballer who plays at Nueva Chicago as a goalkeeper.

== Career ==
=== River Plate ===
Díaz joined the youth academy of River Plate in 2007. He was the 5th goalkeeper for the club when he got called up to the senior team for the first time on 16 May 2021. The 4 first-choice goalkeepers tested positive for COVID-19, forcing Díaz to start for River Plate in an Argentine Primera División match against their rivals Boca Juniors in the Superclásico. Díaz made several saves, and the game was 1–1 before heading to overtime; Díaz made a penalty save, but River Plate ended up losing 4–2 in penalties. On 17 June 2021, he signed his first professional contract with the club until December 2024.

=== Las Vegas Lights ===
On February 15, 2023, Diaz joined the American team Las Vegas Lights of the USL Championship.
